= 2022–23 Slovak 1. Liga season =

- League: (Slovakia) Slovak 1. Liga
- Sport: Ice hockey
- Duration: 24 September 2022 – 3 March 2023; (Regular season); 7 March – 26 April (playoffs)
- Teams: 12+1
- Total attendance: 220,134
- Average attendance: 669
- TV partner(s): JOJ Šport, Niké TV

Regular season
- League Champion: Vlci Žilina
- Top scorer: Michel Miklík (Trnava); (62 points)

Playoffs

Finals
- Champions: HC 19 Humenné (1st title)
- Runners-up: Vlci Žilina

Slovak 1. Liga seasons
- 2021–22 2023–24

The 2022–23 Slovak 1. Liga season was the 30th season of the Slovak 1. Liga, the second level of ice hockey in Slovakia.

== Regular season ==
=== Standings ===
Each team played 44 games: playing each of the other eleven teams four times – twice at home, twice away. At the end of the regular season, the team that finished with the most points was crowned the league champion. Each team played two matches with Slovakia U18 (home and away) to support the preparation of the SR team for 2023 IIHF World U18 Championships.

Pos	Team	Pld	W	OTW	OTL	L	GF	GA	GD	Pts	Qualification
1	Žilina	46	25	8	3	10	181	113	+68	94	Qualification to Quarter-finals
2	Dubnica	46	24	3	7	12	148	123	+25	85	Qualification to Quarter-finals
3	Humenné	46	23	6	4	13	172	127	+45	85	Qualification to Quarter-finals
4	Trnava	46	19	9	5	13	175	149	+26	80	Qualification to Quarter-finals
5	Martin	46	20	8	4	14	140	112	+28	80	Qualification to Quarter-finals
6	Modré krídla Slovan	46	18	4	7	17	126	131	−5	69	Qualification to Quarter-finals
7	Skalica	46	18	5	4	19	130	135	−5	68	Qualification to Wild card round
8	Považská Bystrica	46	18	4	5	19	155	153	+2	67	Qualification to Wild card round
9	Žiar nad Hronom	46	19	1	5	21	142	142	0	64	Qualification to Wild card round
10	Topoľčany	46	18	1	6	21	116	138	−22	62	Qualification to Wild card round
11	Levice	46	18	3	2	23	138	152	−14	62	
12	Brezno	46	8	5	2	31	90	172	−82	33	Relegated to Slovak 2. Liga
	SR 18	24	2	1	4	17	47	113	−66	12	

Source: Slovenská hokejová liga
Rules for classification: 1) Points; 2) Head-to-head points

== Playoffs ==
Ten teams qualify for the playoffs: the top six teams in the regular season have a bye to the quarterfinals, while teams ranked seventh to tenth meet each other (7 versus 10, 8 versus 9) in a preliminary playoff round.

=== Bracket ===
Wild-card round (best-of-5)
7	Skalica	1
10	Topoľčany	3
8	Považská Bystrica	2
9	Žiar nad Hronom	3

Quarter-finals (best-of-7)
1	Žilina	4
10	Topoľčany	1
2	Dubnica	3
9	Žiar nad Hronom	4
3	Humenné	4
6	Modré krídla Slovan	2
4	Trnava	3
5	Martin	4

Semi-finals (best-of-7)
1	Žilina	4
9	Žiar nad Hronom	2
(Pairings are re-seeded after the first and second round)
3	Humenné	4
5	Martin	2

Finals (best-of-7)
1	Žilina	3
3	Humenné	4

=== Wild card round ===
Skalica – Topoľčany 1–3
7.3.2023	Skalica	Topoľčany	7-2
8.3.2023	Skalica	Topoľčany	1-5
10.3.2023	Topoľčany	Skalica	4-3
11.3.2023	Topoľčany	Skalica	2-1
Topoľčany won the series 3–1.

Považská Bystrica – Žiar nad Hronom 2–3
7.3.2023	Považská Bystrica	Žiar nad Hronom	3-4
8.3.2023	Považská Bystrica	Žiar nad Hronom	3-1
10.3.2023	Žiar nad Hronom	Považská Bystrica	2-4
11.3.2023	Žiar nad Hronom	Považská Bystrica	7-1
13.3.2023	Považská Bystrica	Žiar nad Hronom	2-5
Žiar nad Hronom won the series 3–2.

=== Quarterfinals ===
Žilina – Topoľčany 4–1
16.3.2023	Žilina	Topoľčany	8-0
17.3.2023	Žilina	Topoľčany	7-2
20.3.2023	Topoľčany	Žilina	6-7
21.3.2023	Topoľčany	Žilina	5-4 OT
23.3.2023	Žilina	Topoľčany	7-3
Žilina won the series 4–1.

Humenné – Modré krídla Slovan 4–2
14.3.2023	Humenné	Modré krídla Slovan	4-1
15.3.2023	Humenné	Modré krídla Slovan	0-1
18.3.2023	Modré krídla Slovan	Humenné	1-5
19.3.2023	Modré krídla Slovan	Humenné	4-3 OT
22.3.2023	Humenné	Modré krídla Slovan	4-3 SO
24.3.2023	Modré krídla Slovan	Humenné	2-3 OT
Humenné won the series 4–2.

Dubnica – Žiar nad Hronom 3–4
16.3.2023	Dubnica	Žiar nad Hronom	2-1
17.3.2023	Dubnica	Žiar nad Hronom	4-0
20.3.2023	Žiar nad Hronom	Dubnica	0-1
21.3.2023	Žiar nad Hronom	Dubnica	4-3
23.3.2023	Dubnica	Žiar nad Hronom	3-4 SO
25.3.2023	Žiar nad Hronom	Dubnica	3-2 SO
27.3.2023	Dubnica	Žiar nad Hronom	3-4
Žiar nad Hronom won the series 4–3.

Trnava – Martin 3–4
14.3.2023	Trnava	Martin	5-1
15.3.2023	Trnava	Martin	0-4
18.3.2023	Martin	Trnava	4-1
19.3.2023	Martin	Trnava	3-5
22.3.2023	Trnava	Martin	5-2
24.3.2023	Martin	Trnava	2-1 OT
26.3.2023	Trnava	Martin	2-3
Martin won the series 4–3.

=== Semifinals ===
Žilina – Žiar nad Hronom 4–2
30.3.2023	Žilina	Žiar nad Hronom	6-3
31.3.2023	Žilina	Žiar nad Hronom	2-1
3.4.2023	Žiar nad Hronom	Žilina	5-4 SO
4.4.2023	Žiar nad Hronom	Žilina	2-6
7.4.2023	Žilina	Žiar nad Hronom	1-2
9.4.2023	Žiar nad Hronom	Žilina	2-4
Žilina won the series 4–2.

Humenné – Martin 4–2
1.4.2023	Humenné	Martin	3-1
2.4.2023	Humenné	Martin	0-5
5.4.2023	Martin	Humenné	2-3
6.4.2023	Martin	Humenné	6-2
8.4.2023	Humenné	Martin	5-0
10.4.2023	Martin	Humenné	1-4
Humenné won the series 4–2.

=== Finals ===
15 April 2022; 18:30 (CEST)	Žilina	2–5 (0–0, 1–3, 1–2) score in the series: 0–1	Humenné	Niké Aréna, Žilina; Attendance: 4,636

Game reference

Patrik Romančík
Goalies
Roman Durný
Referees:
Juraj Konc Jr.
Roman Výleta
Linesmen:
Adam Jurčiak
Drahoslav Vyšný

Halama (Grebenschikov, Varga) – 27:08	1–0
	1–1	31:40 – Borov (Krajňák, Legalin) (PP)
	1–2	33:45 – Lačný
	1–3	39:47 – Frič (Markuš, Novota)
	1–4	51:12 – Lenďák (Safaraleev, Vrábeľ) (PP)
	1–5	56:25 – Lačný (Trandin)
Rehák (Bečka, Lopušan) – 59:24	2–5

39 min
Penalties
33 min
45
Shots
29

16 April 2022; 18:30 (CEST)	Žilina	7–0 (3–0, 2–0, 2–0) score in the series: 1–1	Humenné	Niké Aréna, Žilina; Attendance: 3,342

Game reference

Patrik Romančík
Goalies
Roman Durný
Filip Krasanovský
Referees:
Filip Crman
Milan Novák
Linesmen:
Róbert Frimmel
Michal Klejna

Sýkora (Koyš, Pohl) (PP) – 03:14	1–0
Halama (Novák, Varga) (PP) – 07:36	2–0
Varga (Halama, Šidlík) (PP) – 13:25	3–0
Varga (Pohl, Halama) – 22:58	4–0
Halama (Tibenský, Varga) (PP) – 39:19	5–0
Halama (Tibenský, Kluka) (PP) – 44:18	6–0
Jakubík (Macek, Kluka) – 48:12	7–0

8 min
Penalties
16 min
34
Shots
18

19 April 2022; 19:00 (CEST)	Humenné	2–1 (0–0, 2–0, 0–1) score in the series: 2–1	Žilina	Humenné Ice Stadium, Humenné; Attendance: 2,640

Game reference

Roman Durný
Goalies
Patrik Romančík
Referees:
Martin Korba
Martin Smrek
Linesmen:
Andrej Bogdaň
Michal Drblík

Lačný (Vrábeľ, Vaško) – 23:01	1–0
Krajňák – 30:17	2–0
	2–1	49:17 – Koyš (Sýkora, Šidlík)

8 min
Penalties
10 min
30
Shots
31

20 April 2022; 18:00 (CEST)	Humenné	4–3 GWS (1–2, 1–0, 1–1) (OT: 0–0) (SO: 1–0) score in the series: 3–1	Žilina	Humenné Ice Stadium, Humenné; Attendance: 2,480

Game reference

Roman Durný
Goalies
Patrik Romančík
Referees:
Peter Rojík
Tomáš Orolin
Linesmen:
Tomáš Knižka
Martin Ordzovenský

	0–1	01:15 – Grebenschikov
	0–2	06:36 – Macek (Paukovček, Mráz) (PP)
Trandin (Vrábeľ, Lenďák) (PP) – 12:23	1–2
Safaraleev (Lenďák, Vrábeľ) (PP) – 20:56	2–2
	2–3	55:10 – Mráz (Pohl)
Vrábeľ (Safaraleev, Lenďák) (PP, EN) – 58:19	3–3

Lačný (miss)
Krajňák (miss)
Legalin (miss)
Lenďák
Markuš
Shootout
Pohl
(miss) Halama
(miss) Varga
(miss) Růžička
(miss) Mráz
8 min
Penalties
16 min
29
Shots
37

22 April 2022; 18:30 (CEST)	Žilina	9–1 (2–1, 6–0, 1–0) score in the series: 2–3	Humenné	Niké Aréna, Žilina; Attendance: 4,620

Game reference

Patrik Romančík
Goalies
Roman Durný
Filip Krasanovský
Referees:
Vladimír Fridrich
Martin Korba
Linesmen:
Martin Hercog
Peter Tvrdoň

Varga (Pacalaj, Melcher) – 06:16	1–0
Paukovček (Koyš, Pohl) (PP) – 08:42	2–0
	2–1	18:45 – Ťavoda (Novický, Horvát)
Mráz (Koyš, Macek) (PP) – 20:31	3–1
Melcher (Varga, Novák) – 20:45	4–1
Růžička (Koyš, Lopušan) – 22:20	5–1
Sýkora – 29:04	6–1
Macek (Mráz, Pacalaj) – 30:39	7–1
Jakubík (Sýkora) – 32:18	8–1
Rehák (Macek) – 56:25	9–1

22 min
Penalties
18 min
38
Shots
30

24 April 2022; 16:00 (CEST)	Humenné	1–2 OT (1–0, 0–1, 1–1) (OT: 0–1) score in the series: 3–3	Žilina	Humenné Ice Stadium, Humenné; Attendance: 2,294

Game reference

Roman Durný
Goalies
Patrik Romančík
Referees:
Tomáš Orolin
Filip Crman
Linesmen:
Lukáš Kacej
Andrej Bogdaň

Safaraleev (Vaško, Lenďák) – 06:49	1–0
	1–1	39:01 – Paukovček (Melcher, Varga) (PP)
	1–2	62:43 – Pohl (Halama, Varga) (PP)

8 min
Penalties
12 min
18
Shots
41

26 April 2022; 17:30 (CEST)	Žilina	2–3 GWS (1–0, 0–0, 1–2) (OT: 0–0) (SO: 0–1) score in the series: 3–4	Humenné	Niké Aréna, Žilina; Attendance: 5,036

Game reference

Patrik Romančík
Goalies
Roman Durný
Referees:
Vladimír Baluška
Daniel Konc Sr.
Linesmen:
Tomáš Knižka
Tomáš Gegáň

Sýkora – 06:56	1–0
	1–1	Trandin (Ťavoda, Legalin) – 47:17
Mráz (Koyš, Šidlík) – 48:05	2–1
	2–2	Safaraleev (Trandin, Frič) – 54:36

Pohl (miss)
Sýkora (miss)
Mráz (miss)
Varga (miss)
Macek (miss)
Shootout
(miss) Lačný
(miss) Krajňák
(miss) Legalin
Lenďák
0 min
Penalties
0 min
43
Shots
36

== Final rankings ==
Gold medal	Humenné
Silver medal	Žilina
Bronze medal	Martin
4	Žiar nad Hronom
5	Dubnica
6	Trnava
7	Modré krídla Slovan
8	Topoľčany
9	Skalica
10	Považská Bystrica
11	Levice
12	Brezno
	SR 18
