= 2021–22 Slovak 1. Liga season =

- League: (Slovakia) Slovak 1. Liga
- Sport: Ice hockey
- Duration: 22 September 2021 – 27 February 2022; (Regular season); 1 March – 13 April 2022 (playoffs)
- Teams: 13

Regular season
- League Champion: Vlci Žilina
- Top scorer: Daniel Štumpf (Skalica); (72 points)

Playoffs

Finals
- Champions: Vlci Žilina (2nd title)
- Runners-up: HK Martin

Slovak 1. Liga seasons
- 2020–21 2022–23

The 2021–22 Slovak 1. Liga season was the 29th season of the Slovak 1. Liga, the second level of ice hockey in Slovakia.

== Regular season ==
=== Standings ===
Each team played 44 games: playing each of the other eleven teams four times – 2x at home, 2x away. At the end of the regular season, the team that finished with the most points was crowned the league champion. Each 1HL team played two matches with SR 18 (1x at home and 1x outside) to support the preparation of the SR team for MS U18.

| Pos | Team | Pld | W | OTW | OTL | L | GF | GA | GD | Pts | Qualification |
|---|---|---|---|---|---|---|---|---|---|---|---|
| 1 | Žilina | 45 | 34 | 4 | 5 | 2 | 188 | 76 | +112 | 115 | Qualification to Quarter-finals |
| 2 | Skalica | 45 | 25 | 6 | 3 | 11 | 192 | 124 | +68 | 90 | Qualification to Quarter-finals |
| 3 | Martin | 46 | 26 | 3 | 5 | 12 | 161 | 123 | +38 | 89 | Qualification to Quarter-finals |
| 4 | Humenné | 44 | 21 | 6 | 2 | 15 | 138 | 103 | +35 | 77 | Qualification to Quarter-finals |
| 5 | Topoľčany | 43 | 22 | 4 | 2 | 15 | 140 | 110 | +30 | 76 | Qualification to Quarter-finals |
| 6 | Dubnica | 43 | 17 | 7 | 4 | 15 | 145 | 126 | +19 | 69 | Qualification to Quarter-finals |
| 7 | Považská Bystrica | 45 | 20 | 2 | 4 | 19 | 121 | 137 | −16 | 68 | Qualification to Wild card round |
| 8 | Trnava | 46 | 16 | 5 | 5 | 20 | 155 | 174 | −19 | 63 | Qualification to Wild card round |
| 9 | Žiar nad Hronom | 46 | 17 | 1 | 6 | 22 | 108 | 142 | −34 | 59 | Qualification to Wild card round |
| 10 | Modré krídla Slovan | 45 | 13 | 6 | 4 | 22 | 115 | 147 | −32 | 55 | Qualification to Wild card round |
| 11 | Levice | 46 | 11 | 2 | 3 | 30 | 98 | 158 | −60 | 40 | |
| 12 | Brezno | 46 | 10 | 1 | 4 | 31 | 106 | 175 | −69 | 36 | Qualification to Play Out |
| | SR 18 | 24 | 2 | 1 | 1 | 20 | 44 | 116 | −72 | 9 | |

Source: Slovenská hokejová liga
Rules for classification: 1) Points; 2) Head-to-head points

== Playoffs ==
Ten teams qualify for the playoffs: the top six teams in the regular season have a bye to the quarterfinals, while teams ranked seventh to tenth meet each other (7 versus 10, 8 versus 9) in a preliminary playoff round.

=== Bracket ===
Wild-card round (best-of-5)
7 | Považská Bystrica | 1
10 | Modré krídla Slovan | 3
8 | Trnava | 3
9 | Žiar nad Hronom | 1

Quarter-finals (best-of-7)
1 | Žilina | 4
10 | Modré krídla Slovan | 0
4 | Humenné | 1
5 | Topoľčany | 4
2 | Skalica | 4
8 | Trnava | 3
3 | Martin | 4
6 | Dubnica | 3

Semi-finals (best-of-7)
1 | Žilina | 4
5 | Topoľčany | 0
(Pairings are re-seeded after the first and second round)
2 | Skalica | 1
3 | Martin | 4

Finals (best-of-7)
1 | Žilina | 4
3 | Martin | 2

=== Wild card round ===
Považská Bystrica – Modré krídla Slovan 1–3
| 1.3.2022 | Považská Bystrica | Modré krídla Slovan | 5-2 |
| 2.3.2022 | Považská Bystrica | Modré krídla Slovan | 1-3 |
| 4.3.2022 | Modré krídla Slovan | Považská Bystrica | 3-2 |
| 5.3.2022 | Modré krídla Slovan | Považská Bystrica | 2-1 |
Modré krídla Slovan won the series 3–1.

Trnava – Žiar nad Hronom 3–1
| 1.3.2022 | Trnava | Žiar nad Hronom | 5-4 |
| 2.3.2022 | Trnava | Žiar nad Hronom | 3-1 |
| 4.3.2022 | Žiar nad Hronom | Trnava | 5-2 |
| 5.3.2022 | Žiar nad Hronom | Trnava | 3-5 |
Trnava won the series 3–1.

=== Quarterfinals ===
Žilina – Modré krídla Slovan 4–0
| 10.3.2022 | Žilina | Modré krídla Slovan | 1-0 |
| 11.3.2022 | Žilina | Modré krídla Slovan | 4-0 |
| 14.3.2022 | Modré krídla Slovan | Žilina | 3-7 |
| 15.3.2022 | Modré krídla Slovan | Žilina | 0-1 |
Žilina won the series 4–0.

Martin – Dubnica 4–3
| 8.3.2022 | Martin | Dubnica | 2-3 OT1 |
| 9.3.2022 | Martin | Dubnica | 4-1 |
| 12.3.2022 | Dubnica | Martin | 1-0 SO |
| 13.3.2022 | Dubnica | Martin | 2-3 OT1 |
| 16.3.2022 | Martin | Dubnica | 4-1 |
| 18.3.2022 | Dubnica | Martin | 3-0 |
| 20.3.2022 | Martin | Dubnica | 4-1 |
Martin won the series 4–3.

Skalica – Trnava 4–3
| 10.3.2022 | Skalica | Trnava | 3-4 |
| 11.3.2022 | Skalica | Trnava | 5-3 |
| 14.3.2022 | Trnava | Skalica | 2-4 |
| 15.3.2022 | Trnava | Skalica | 5-2 |
| 17.3.2022 | Skalica | Trnava | 2-1 |
| 19.3.2022 | Trnava | Skalica | 2-1 OT1 |
| 21.3.2022 | Skalica | Trnava | 3-2 OT1 |
Skalica won the series 4–3.

Humenné – Topoľčany 1–4
| 8.3.2022 | Humenné | Topoľčany | 1-3 |
| 9.3.2022 | Humenné | Topoľčany | 0-3 |
| 12.3.2022 | Topoľčany | Humenné | 2-3 SO |
| 13.3.2022 | Topoľčany | Humenné | 5-3 |
| 16.3.2022 | Humenné | Topoľčany | 2-5 |
Topoľčany won the series 4–1.

=== Semifinals ===
Žilina – Topoľčany 4–0
| 26.3.2022 | Žilina | Topoľčany | 3-2 |
| 27.3.2022 | Žilina | Topoľčany | 5-1 |
| 30.3.2022 | Topoľčany | Žilina | 0-1 |
| 31.3.2022 | Topoľčany | Žilina | 1-2 SO |
Žilina won the series 4–0.

Skalica – Martin 1–4
| 24.3.2022 | Skalica | Martin | 2-3 OT1 |
| 25.3.2022 | Skalica | Martin | 2-4 |
| 28.3.2022 | Martin | Skalica | 2-3 OT1 |
| 29.3.2022 | Martin | Skalica | 3-0 |
| 1.4.2022 | Skalica | Martin | 1-5 |
Martin won the series 4–1.

=== Finals ===
| 4 April 2022; 17:00 (UTC+2) | Žilina | 2–3 (1–0, 1–2, 0–1) score in the series: 0–1 | Martin | Niké Aréna, Žilina; Attendance: 3,084 |

Game reference

Stanislav Škorvánek
Goalies
Vladimír Glosár
Referees:
Milan Adamec
Michal Smrek
Linesmen:
Lukáš Beniač
Maroš Pribula

| Koyš (Drtina) (PP) – 01:21 | 1–0 |
| | 1–1 | 21:44 – Makarov (Nauš) |
| | 1–2 | 23:53 – Tiainen (Charvát, Makarov) (PP) |
| Petran (Safaraleev, Šidlík) – 38:19 | 2–2 |
| | 2–3 | 56:10 – Poliaček (Makarov) |

8 min
Penalties
6 min
35
Shots
41

| 5 April 2022; 17:30 (UTC+2) | Žilina | 0–1 (0–1, 0–0, 0–0) score in the series: 0–2 | Martin | Niké Aréna, Žilina; Attendance: 3,096 |

Game reference
| Stanislav Škorvánek | Goalies | Vladimír Glosár | Referees: Roman Výleta; Michal Mĺkvy; Linesmen: Ivan Haringa; Juraj Šefčík |
| 0–1 / 10:29 – Poliaček (Toma, Charvát) (PP) | | | Referees: Roman Výleta; Michal Mĺkvy; Linesmen: Ivan Haringa; Juraj Šefčík |
| 6 min | Penalties | 6 min | Referees: Roman Výleta; Michal Mĺkvy; Linesmen: Ivan Haringa; Juraj Šefčík |
| 16 | Shots | 18 | Referees: Roman Výleta; Michal Mĺkvy; Linesmen: Ivan Haringa; Juraj Šefčík |

| 8 April 2022; 17:30 (UTC+2) | Martin | 3–4 GWS (0–1, 3–0, 0–2) (OT: 0–0) (SO: 0–1) score in the series: 2–1 | Žilina | Martin Ice Stadium, Martin; Attendance: 3,180 |

Game reference

Vladimír Glosár
Goalies
Stanislav Škorvánek
Referees:
Martin Jobbágy
Vladimír Fridrich
Linesmen:
Matej Janiga
Michal Orolin

| | 0–1 | 14:32 – Safaraleev (Drtina) (PP) |
| Poliaček (Toma, Juščák) (PP) – 28:00 | 1–1 |
| Poliaček (Makarov) – 31:46 | 2–1 |
| Murček (Tiainen, Makarov) (PP) – 35:32 | 3–1 |
| | 3–2 | 40:22 – Koyš (Safaraleev, Jansons) (PP) |
| | 3–3 | 59:42 – Markovič (Drtina, Macek) |

Poliaček (miss)
Makarov (miss)
Huhtela
Dírer
Nauš (miss)
Dírer
Huhtela (miss)
Dírer (miss)
Charvát (miss)
Fafrák (miss)
Makarov (miss)
Huhtela (miss)
Shootout
Petráš
(miss) Koyš
(miss) Halama
(miss) Markovič
Mikula
Mikula
(miss) Petráš
(miss) Mikula
(miss) Petráš
(miss) Markovič
(miss) Halama
Linet

| 9 April 2022; 18:00 (UTC+2) | Martin | 2–3 GWS (0–1, 0–1, 2–0) (OT: 0–0) (SO: 0–1) score in the series: 2–2 | Žilina | Martin Ice Stadium, Martin; Attendance: 3,498 |

Game reference

Vladimír Glosár
Goalies
Stanislav Škorvánek
Referees:
Martin Korba
Peter Stano
Linesmen:
Jaroslav Riš
Andrej Bogdaň

| | 0–1 | 09:03 – Safaraleev (Šmída) |
| | 0–2 | 23:27 – Petráš (Halama, Pišoja) |
| Makarov (Huhtela) – 50:20 | 1–2 |
| Huhtela (Makarov) – 54:12 | 2–2 |

Poliaček (miss)
Tiainen
Huhtela (miss)
Charvát (miss)
Shootout
Petráš
Safaraleev
(miss) Linet
(miss) Mikula
Koyš
33 min
Penalties
31 min
44
Shots
34

| 11 April 2022; 17:30 (UTC+2) | Žilina | 3–2 OT (0–1, 1–0, 1–1) (OT: 1–0) score in the series: 3–2 | Martin | Niké Aréna, Žilina; Attendance: 4,116 |

Game reference

Stanislav Škorvánek
Goalies
Vladimír Glosár
Referees:
Róbert Müllner
Juraj Konc Jr.
Linesmen:
Adam Jurčiak
Tomáš Knižka

| | 0–1 | 14:21 – Murček (Fafrák, Tiainen) |
| Petráš (Halama, Šidlík) – 26:42 | 1–1 |
| Petráš (Šidlík) – 45:54 | 2–1 |
| | 2–2 | 55:44 – Toma (Juščák) |
| Safaraleev (Drtina, Koyš) – 66:26 | 3–2 |

6 min
Penalties
4 min
26
Shots
24

| 13 April 2022; 18:00 (UTC+2) | Martin | 2–3 OT (0–0, 0–2, 2–0) (OT: 0–1) score in the series: 2–4 | Žilina | Martin Ice Stadium, Martin; Attendance: 2,899 |

Game reference

Vladimír Glosár
Goalies
Stanislav Škorvánek
Referees:
Ondrej Kalina
Miroslav Štefik
Linesmen:
Martin Ordzovenský
Martin Staššák

| | 0–1 | 28:52 – Jansons (PP) |
| | 0–2 | 36:18 – Cíger (Skladaný, Jansons) |
| Juščák (Dírer) – 49:40 | 1–2 |
| Poliaček (Charvát) (PP2) – 55:38 | 2–2 |
| | 2–3 | 60:25 – Halama (Jansons) |

10 min
Penalties
10 min
22
Shots
16

== Relegation ==
Regular season 12th placed Brezno will play a best-of-7 series against the 2. Liga winner Trebišov.

Brezno – Trebišov 4–3
| 13.04.2022 | Trebišov | Brezno | 5-6 OT |
| 14.04.2022 | Trebišov | Brezno | 2-1 |
| 17.04.2022 | Brezno | Trebišov | 5-2 |
| 18.04.2022 | Brezno | Trebišov | 1-4 |
| 20.04.2022 | Trebišov | Brezno | 2-3 SO |
| 22.04.2022 | Brezno | Trebišov | 1-2 |
| 24.04.2022 | Trebišov | Brezno | 2-3 OT |
Brezno won the series 4–3.

== Final rankings ==
| Gold medal | Žilina |
| Silver medal | Martin |
| Bronze medal | Skalica |
| 4 | Topoľčany |
| 5 | Humenné |
| 6 | Dubnica |
| 7 | Trnava |
| 8 | Modré krídla Slovan |
| 9 | Považská Bystrica |
| 10 | Žiar nad Hronom |
| 11 | Levice |
| 12 | Brezno |
| | SR 18 |
