= 2023–24 Slovak 1. Liga season =

- League: (Slovakia) Slovak 1. Liga
- Sport: Ice hockey
- Duration: 22 September 2023 – 3 March 2024; (Regular season); 6 March – 19 April 2024 (playoffs)
- Teams: 12+1
- Total attendance: 247 413
- Average attendance: 749
- TV partner(s): JOJ Šport, Niké TV

Regular season
- League Champion: Vlci Žilina
- Runners-up: HC Prešov
- Top scorer: Andrei Legalin (Topoľčany) (68 points)

Playoffs

Finals
- Champions: Vlci Žilina (3rd title)
- Runners-up: HC Prešov

Slovak 1. Liga seasons
- 2022–23 2024–25

The 2023–24 Slovak 1. Liga season was the 31st season of the Slovak 1. Liga, the second level of ice hockey in Slovakia. With a record-breaking number of points, Vlci Žilina topped the regular season standings. They advanced to the playoff finals, where they beat second-seeded HC Prešov in four straight games to secure promotion to the 2024–25 Slovak Extraliga.

== Regular season ==
=== Standings ===
Each team played 46 games: playing each of the other eleven teams four times – twice at home, twice away. There were also two matches each against the Slovakia men's national under-18 ice hockey team, which counted towards the standings; these matches were designed to support the preparation of the junior national team for 2024 IIHF World U18 Championships. At the end of the regular season, the team that finished with the most points was crowned the league champion. Vlci Žilina topped the regular season standings, losing just three times in 46 games. Their total of 123 points set a league record.

Pos	Team	Pld	W	OTW	OTL	L	GF	GA	GD	Pts	Qualification
1	Žilina	46	37	6	0	3	212	74	+138	123	Qualification to Quarter-finals
2	Prešov	46	24	5	7	10	186	127	+59	89	Qualification to Quarter-finals
3	Topoľčany	46	24	4	5	13	175	143	+32	85	Qualification to Quarter-finals
4	Považská Bystrica	46	22	5	3	16	147	145	+2	76	Qualification to Quarter-finals
5	Skalica	46	22	4	1	19	149	148	+1	75	Qualification to Quarter-finals
6	Dubnica	46	18	6	5	17	128	128	0	71	Qualification to Quarter-finals
7	Modré krídla Slovan	46	19	3	4	20	133	119	+14	67	Qualification to Wild card round
8	Žiar nad Hronom	46	19	3	3	21	145	145	0	66	Qualification to Wild card round
9	Trebišov	46	16	3	3	24	138	175	−37	57 (Note: Trebišov 7 points, AquaCity Pikes 5)	Qualification to Wild card round
10	AquaCity Pikes	46	14	5	5	22	130	158	−28	57	Qualification to Wild card round
11	Trnava	46	11	5	7	23	148	182	−34	50	
12	Rimavská Sobota	46	11	1	6	28	121	180	−59	41	Relegated to Slovak 2. Liga
	SR 18	24	1	1	2	20	41	129	−88	7	

Source: Slovenská hokejová liga
Rules for classification: 1) Points; 2) Head-to-head points

== Playoffs ==
Ten teams qualify for the playoffs: the top six teams in the regular season have a bye to the quarterfinals, while teams ranked seventh to tenth meet each other (7 versus 10, 8 versus 9) in a preliminary playoff round. In the final, Žilina beat HC Prešov 4–0 in a best-of-seven series to win the playoffs and secure promotion to the following season's Extraliga. It symbolised their return to the top tier of Slovak ice hockey for the first time since the 2018–19 season.

=== Bracket ===
Wild-card round (best-of-5)
8	Žiar nad Hronom	3
9	Trebišov	0
7	Modré krídla Slovan	3
10	AquaCity Pikes	1

Quarter-finals (best-of-7)
1	Žilina	4
8	Žiar nad Hronom	1
3	Topoľčany	2
6	Dubnica	4
2	Prešov	4
7	Modré krídla Slovan	0
4	Považská Bystrica	4
5	Skalica	1

Semi-finals (best-of-7)
1	Žilina	4
6	Dubnica	2
(Pairings are re-seeded after the first and second round)
2	Prešov	4
4	Považská Bystrica	1

Finals (best-of-7)
1	Žilina	4
2	Prešov	0

=== Wild card round ===
Modré krídla Slovan – AquaCity Pikes 3–1
6.3.2024	Modré krídla Slovan	AquaCity Pikes	4-1
7.3.2024	Modré krídla Slovan	AquaCity Pikes	2-4
9.3.2024	AquaCity Pikes	Modré krídla Slovan	2-5
10.3.2024	AquaCity Pikes	Modré krídla Slovan	0-7
Modré krídla Slovan won the series 3–1.

Žiar nad Hronom – Trebišov 3–0
6.3.2024	Žiar nad Hronom	Trebišov	11-3
7.3.2024	Žiar nad Hronom	Trebišov	4-2
9.3.2024	Trebišov	Žiar nad Hronom	2-3 OT
Žiar nad Hronom won the series 3–0.

=== Quarterfinals ===
Žilina – Žiar nad Hronom 4–1
15.3.2024	Žilina	Žiar nad Hronom	2-0
16.3.2024	Žilina	Žiar nad Hronom	6-1
19.3.2024	Žiar nad Hronom	Žilina	2-4
20.3.2024	Žiar nad Hronom	Žilina	5-3
22.3.2024	Žilina	Žiar nad Hronom	3-1
Žilina won the series 4–1.

Topoľčany – Dubnica 2–4
13.3.2024	Topoľčany	Dubnica	3-2
14.3.2024	Topoľčany	Dubnica	0-1
17.3.2024	Dubnica	Topoľčany	6-2
18.3.2024	Dubnica	Topoľčany	1-2 OT
21.3.2024	Topoľčany	Dubnica	2-4
23.3.2024	Dubnica	Topoľčany	5-2
Dubnica won the series 4–2.

Prešov – Modré krídla Slovan 4–0
15.3.2024	Prešov	Modré krídla Slovan	4-1
16.3.2024	Prešov	Modré krídla Slovan	2-1 OT
19.3.2024	Modré krídla Slovan	Prešov	1-7
20.3.2024	Modré krídla Slovan	Prešov	1-5
Prešov won the series 4–0.

Považská Bystrica – Skalica 4–1
13.3.2024	Považská Bystrica	Skalica	5-0
14.3.2024	Považská Bystrica	Skalica	1-7
17.3.2024	Skalica	Považská Bystrica	0-4
18.3.2024	Skalica	Považská Bystrica	3-5
21.3.2024	Považská Bystrica	Skalica	6-2
Považská Bystrica won the series 4–1.

=== Semifinals ===
Žilina – Dubnica 4–2
29.3.2024	Žilina	Dubnica	6-0
30.3.2024	Žilina	Dubnica	3-1
2.4.2024	Dubnica	Žilina	3-2
3.4.2024	Dubnica	Žilina	4-3 SO
6.4.2024	Žilina	Dubnica	8-4
8.4.2024	Dubnica	Žilina	2-3 OT
Žilina won the series 4–2.

Prešov – Považská Bystrica 4–1
31.3.2024	Prešov	Považská Bystrica	5-3
1.4.2024	Prešov	Považská Bystrica	3-4 OT
4.4.2024	Považská Bystrica	Prešov	2-5
5.4.2024	Považská Bystrica	Prešov	4-5 OT
7.4.2024	Prešov	Považská Bystrica	3-0
Prešov won the series 4–1.

=== Finals ===
14 April 2024; 17:30 (CEST)	Žilina	8–1 (0–1, 5–0, 3–0) score in the series: 1–0	Prešov	Niké Aréna, Žilina; Attendance: 4,900

Game reference

Michal Valent
Goalies
Juraj Ovečka
Juraj Hollý

	0–1	18:11 – Hrabčák (Sigaryov, Jerofejevs) (PP2)
Safaraleev (Rajnoha) – 23:27	1–1
Belluš (Jansons, Malina) – 28:38	2–1
Galamboš (Bezúch, Varga) – 30:56	3–1
Mráz (Koyš, Melcher) – 34:42	4–1
Koyš (Dyakov) – 37:53	5–1
Jakúbek (Paukovček) – 44:01	6–1
Varga (Galamboš, Bezúch) – 44:24	7–1
Varga (SH) – 53:11	8–1

18 min
Penalties
10 min
32
Shots
38

15 April 2024; 17:30 (CEST)	Žilina	5–0 (2–0, 0–0, 3–0) score in the series: 2–0	Prešov	Niké Aréna, Žilina; Attendance: 4,063

Game reference

Michal Valent
Goalies
Juraj Ovečka

Bezúch (Varga, Pobežal) – 00:36	1–0
Bezúch (Dyakov, Mráz) (PP) – 08:04	2–0
Koyš (EN) – 54:20	3–0
Paukovček (Beták, Belluš) – 56:24	4–0
Belluš (Beták, Galamboš) (SH, EN) – 58:54	5–0

12 min
Penalties
27 min
30
Shots
28

18 April 2024; 17:30 (CEST)	Prešov	0–1 (0–0, 0–0, 0–1) score in the series: 0–3	Žilina	Attendance: 2,502

Game reference
29 min	Penalties	31 min
35	Shots	27

19 April 2024; 18:00 (CEST)	Prešov	1–5 (1–0, 0–4, 0–1) score in the series: 0–4	Žilina	Attendance: 3,117

Game reference
6 min	Penalties	6 min
32	Shots	35

== Final rankings ==
Gold medal	Žilina
Silver medal	Prešov
Bronze medal	Považská Bystrica
4	Dubnica
5	Topoľčany
6	Skalica
7	Modré krídla Slovan
8	Žiar nad Hronom
9	Trebišov
10	AquaCity Pikes
11	Trnava
12	Rimavská Sobota
	SR 18
