= 2023–24 Slovak Extraliga season =

- League: Slovak Extraliga
- Sport: Ice hockey
- Duration: 15 September 2023 – 8 March 2024 (regular season); 11 March – 24 April 2024 (playoffs)
- Number of games: 50
- Number of teams: 12

Regular season
- League Champion: HK Poprad
- Top scorer: Olivier Archambault (Spišská Nová Ves); (59 points)

Playoffs
- Playoffs MVP: Samuel Buček (Nitra)

Finals
- Champions: HK Nitra
- Runners-up: HK Spišská Nová Ves

Slovak Extraliga seasons
- ← 2022–23 2024–25 →

The 2023–24 Slovak Extraliga season was the 31st season of the Slovak Extraliga, the highest ice hockey league in Slovakia.

== Team changes ==
HC 19 Humenné are playing in the league for the first time after winning Slovak 1. Liga in the season 2022–23 in a best-of-seven playoff against Vlci Žilina.

HC MV Transport Prešov finished in the 2022–23 Slovak Extraliga season on the last 12th place and was relegated to a second highest ice hockey league in Slovakia.

== Regular season ==
=== Standings ===
Each team played 50 games: playing each of the other eleven teams four times – 2x at home, 2x away (44 games) and during the Christmas holidays (22.12.2023 – 5.1.2024) each team played the inserted matches within the region 1x at home, 1x away = 6 games.

Points were awarded for each game, where three points are awarded for winning in regulation time, two points for winning in overtime or shootout, one point for losing in overtime or shootout, and zero points for losing in regulation time. At the end of the regular season, the team that finished with the most points was crowned the league champion.

Pos	Team	Pld	W	OTW	OTL	L	GF	GA	GD	Pts	Qualification
1	Poprad	50	27	5	3	15	163	119	+44	94	Qualification to Quarter-finals
2	Michalovce	50	27	4	1	18	167	121	+46	90	Qualification to Quarter-finals
3	Spišská Nová Ves	50	24	6	3	17	163	138	+25	87	Qualification to Quarter-finals
4	Košice	50	24	2	5	19	147	117	+30	81	Qualification to Quarter-finals
5	Slovan Bratislava	50	21	5	4	20	157	160	−3	77	Qualification to Quarter-finals
6	Banská Bystrica	50	21	6	1	22	151	172	−21	76 (Note: Bystrica 14 points, Zvolen 12, Nitra 10)	Qualification to Quarter-finals
7	Zvolen	50	19	4	11	16	165	160	+5	76	Qualification to Wild card round
8	Nitra	50	21	4	5	20	172	158	+14	76	Qualification to Wild card round
9	Trenčín	50	21	5	2	22	144	156	−12	75	Qualification to Wild card round
10	Liptovský Mikuláš	50	18	3	4	25	136	161	−25	64	Qualification to Wild card round
11	Nové Zámky	50	16	3	4	27	133	159	−26	58	
12	Humenné	50	13	1	5	31	121	198	−77	46	Relegated to Slovak 1. Liga

Source: Tipos extraliga
Rules for classification: 1) Points; 2) Head-to-head points.

=== Statistics ===
==== Scoring leaders ====
The following shows the top ten players who led the league in points, at the conclusion of the regular season.

Player	Team	GP	G	A	Pts	+/–	PIM
Olivier Archambault	HK Spišská Nová Ves	45	14	45	59	+11	38
Ryan Dmowski	HK Poprad	44	30	27	57	+29	44
Samuel Buček	HK Nitra	44	26	31	57	−2	16
Carter Turnbull	HC '05 Banská Bystrica	41	25	31	56	+2	22
Kaspars Daugaviņš	HK Dukla Michalovce	48	11	43	54	+14	20
Matthew Wilkins	HC '05 Banská Bystrica	49	19	33	52	+4	87
Brent Gates	HK Nitra	48	14	38	52	+3	12
Liam Pecararo	HC Slovan Bratislava	46	17	31	48	+16	30
Igor Merezhko	HK Spišská Nová Ves	49	10	38	48	+27	14
Robby Jackson	HK Nitra	44	26	20	46	+12	10

==== Leading goaltenders ====
The following shows the top ten goaltenders who led the league in goals against average, provided that they have played at least 40% of their team's minutes, at the conclusion of the regular season.

Player	Team	GP	TOI	W	L	GA	SO	SV%	GAA
Dominik Riečický	HC Košice	24	1,287:06	13	11	41	3	93.64	1.91
Ádám Vay	HK Poprad	44	2,501:15	30	14	89	1	92.88	2.13
Jaroslav Janus	HC Košice	30	1,711:23	15	15	63	2	92.35	2.21
Stanislav Škorvánek	HK Dukla Michalovce	39	2,322:38	25	14	90	4	93.08	2.32
Marcel Melicherčík	HK Spišská Nová Ves	30	1,721:17	19	11	71	0	90.65	2.47
Denis Godla	HC Slovan Bratislava	30	1,744:44	19	11	79	2	91.51	2.72
Gašper Krošelj	HC '05 Banská Bystrica	27	1,491:51	16	11	71	3	91.94	2.86
Alexei Krasikov	HK 32 Liptovský Mikuláš	49	2,756:14	21	28	132	1	90.69	2.87
Connor LaCouvee	HK Dukla Trenčín	40	2,282:28	20	20	110	3	91.52	2.89
Pavel Kantor	HC Nové Zámky	48	2,867:45	19	29	139	1	91.18	2.91

== Playoffs ==
Ten teams qualify for the playoffs: the top six teams in the regular season have a bye to the quarterfinals, while teams ranked seventh to tenth meet each other (7 versus 10, 8 versus 9) in a preliminary playoff round.

=== Bracket ===
Wild-card round (best-of-5)
7	Zvolen	3
10	Liptovský Mikuláš	2
8	Nitra	3
9	Trenčín	2

Quarter-finals (best-of-7)
3	Spišská Nová Ves	4
6	Banská Bystrica	0
4	Košice	4
5	Slovan Bratislava	0
2	Michalovce	4
7	Zvolen	1
1	Poprad	2
8	Nitra	4

Semi-finals (best-of-7)
3	Spišská Nová Ves	4
4	Košice	3
(Pairings are re-seeded after the first and second round)
2	Michalovce	2
8	Nitra	4

Finals (best-of-7)
3	Spišská Nová Ves	0
8	Nitra	4

=== Wild card round ===
Zvolen – Liptovský Mikuláš 3–2
11.3.2024	Zvolen	Liptovský Mikuláš	2-3 OT
12.3.2024	Zvolen	Liptovský Mikuláš	7-6 OT
14.3.2024	Liptovský Mikuláš	Zvolen	4-7
15.3.2024	Liptovský Mikuláš	Zvolen	5-1
17.3.2024	Zvolen	Liptovský Mikuláš	6-2
Zvolen won the series 3–2.

Nitra – Trenčín 3–2
11.3.2024	Nitra	Trenčín	5-2
12.3.2024	Nitra	Trenčín	3-4
14.3.2024	Trenčín	Nitra	3-2
15.3.2024	Trenčín	Nitra	4-5
17.3.2024	Nitra	Trenčín	5-1
Nitra won the series 3–2.

=== Quarterfinals ===
Poprad – Nitra 2–4
20.3.2024	Poprad	Nitra	3-1
21.3.2024	Poprad	Nitra	1-5
24.3.2024	Nitra	Poprad	0-2
25.3.2024	Nitra	Poprad	2-1 SO
27.3.2024	Poprad	Nitra	3-4
29.3.2024	Nitra	Poprad	2-0
Nitra won the series 4–2.

Spišská Nová Ves – Banská Bystrica 4–0
18.3.2024	Spišská Nová Ves	Banská Bystrica	3-2 OT
19.3.2024	Spišská Nová Ves	Banská Bystrica	4-2
22.3.2024	Banská Bystrica	Spišská Nová Ves	3-4 OT
23.3.2024	Banská Bystrica	Spišská Nová Ves	3-6
Spišská Nová Ves won the series 4–0.

Michalovce – Zvolen 4–1
20.3.2024	Michalovce	Zvolen	5-0
21.3.2024	Michalovce	Zvolen	5-1
24.3.2024	Zvolen	Michalovce	2-6
25.3.2024	Zvolen	Michalovce	3-2
27.3.2024	Michalovce	Zvolen	3-1
Michalovce won the series 4–1.

Košice – Slovan Bratislava 4–0
18.3.2024	Košice	Slovan Bratislava	6-2
19.3.2024	Košice	Slovan Bratislava	5-4
22.3.2024	Slovan Bratislava	Košice	3-5
23.3.2024	Slovan Bratislava	Košice	2-4
Košice won the series 4–0.

=== Semifinals ===
Michalovce – Nitra 2–4
3.4.2024	Michalovce	Nitra	2-3
4.4.2024	Michalovce	Nitra	2-8
7.4.2024	Nitra	Michalovce	4-7
8.4.2024	Nitra	Michalovce	5-1
11.4.2024	Michalovce	Nitra	5-2
13.4.2024	Nitra	Michalovce	4-3 OT
Nitra won the series 4–2.

Spišská Nová Ves – Košice 4–3
5.4.2024	Spišská Nová Ves	Košice	5-4 OT
6.4.2024	Spišská Nová Ves	Košice	4-0
9.4.2024	Košice	Spišská Nová Ves	6-2
10.4.2024	Košice	Spišská Nová Ves	4-2
12.4.2024	Spišská Nová Ves	Košice	4-3 OT2
14.4.2024	Košice	Spišská Nová Ves	4-1
16.4.2024	Spišská Nová Ves	Košice	2-1
Spišská Nová Ves won the series 4–3.

=== Finals ===
19 April 2024; 18:00	Spišská Nová Ves	2–3 (0–2, 1–0, 1–1) score in the series: 0–1	Nitra	Spiš Aréna, Spišská Nová Ves; Attendance: 4,300

Game reference
Filip Surák	Goalies	Sami Aittokallio
31 min	Penalties	33 min
32	Shots	35

20 April 2024; 18:30	Spišská Nová Ves	2–5 (0–3, 0–1, 2–1) score in the series: 0–2	Nitra	Spiš Aréna, Spišská Nová Ves; Attendance: 4,300

Game reference
Filip Surák; Marcel Melicherčík	Goalies	Libor Kašík
35 min	Penalties	43 min
43	Shots	25

23 April 2024; 18:00	Nitra	5–1 (3–1, 0–0, 2–0) score in the series: 3–0	Spišská Nová Ves	Nitra Aréna, Nitra; Attendance: 3,600

Game reference
Libor Kašík	Goalies	Filip Surák
6 min	Penalties	8 min
34	Shots	32

24 April 2024; 18:00	Nitra	2–1 OT (0–0, 0–0, 1–1) (OT: 1–0) score in the series: 4–0	Spišská Nová Ves	Nitra Aréna, Nitra; Attendance: 3,600

Game reference
Libor Kašík	Goalies	Filip Surák
6 min	Penalties	35 min
49	Shots	28

== Final rankings ==
Gold medal	Nitra
Silver medal	Spišská Nová Ves
Bronze medal	Michalovce
4	Košice
5	Poprad
6	Slovan Bratislava
7	Banská Bystrica
8	Zvolen
9	Trenčín
10	Liptovský Mikuláš
11	Nové Zámky
12	Humenné
