= Marek Hovorka (ice hockey) =

Slovak ice hockey player (born 1984)

- Born: 8 October 1984 (age 41) Dubnica nad Váhom, Czechoslovakia
- Height: 5 ft 10 in (178 cm)
- Weight: 183 lb (83 kg; 13 st 1 lb)
- Position: Forward
- Shoots: Right
- Slovak 1. Liga team Former teams: MHK Dubnica nad Váhom; MHC Martin; MHk 32 Liptovský Mikuláš; HC Slovan Ústečtí Lvi; MHK Dolný Kubín; BK Mladá Boleslav; Rytíři Kladno; HC Sparta Praha; HC Karlovy Vary; Piráti Chomutov; HC Vítkovice; Vlci Žilina; HC Košice; Admiral Vladivostok; HC Dynamo Pardubice; JKH GKS Jastrzębie
- National team: Slovakia
- Playing career: 2003–present

Medal record

Ice hockey

Representing Slovakia

World Championships
Silver medal – second place	2012 Finland/Sweden	

Marek Hovorka (born 8 October 1984) is a Slovak professional ice hockey forward currently playing for MHK Dubnica nad Váhom of the Slovak 1. Liga.

== Career ==
Hovorka previously played HC Slovan Ústečtí Lvi, BK Mladá Boleslav, HC Kladno, HC Sparta Praha, HC Karlovy Vary, Piráti Chomutov and HC Vítkovice. He also played in the Kontinental Hockey League for Admiral Vladivostok and in the Slovak Extraliga for MHC Martin, MHK 32 Liptovský Mikuláš, MsHK Žilina and HC Košice.

== Career statistics ==
=== Regular season and playoffs ===
			Regular season					Playoffs
Season	Team	League	GP	G	A	Pts	PIM	GP	G	A	Pts	PIM
2003–04	HC Martimex ZŤS Martin	Slovak	48	5	8	13	16	—	—	—	—	—
2004–05	MHK 32 Liptovský Mikuláš	Slovak	54	6	6	12	16	5	0	0	0	0
2005–06	MHK 32 Liptovský Mikuláš	Slovak	52	8	5	13	28	—	—	—	—	—
2006–07	MHK 32 Liptovský Mikuláš	Slovak	53	11	26	37	76	—	—	—	—	—
2007–08	MHK 32 Liptovský Mikuláš	Slovak	43	9	12	21	54	—	—	—	—	—
2007–08	HC Slovan Ústečtí Lvi	ELH	4	0	0	0	0	—	—	—	—	—
2008–09	MHC Martin	Slovak	31	5	6	11	51	—	—	—	—	—
2008–09	MHK Dolný Kubín	SVK.2	2	0	1	1	32	—	—	—	—	—
2008–09	HC Slovan Ústečtí Lvi	CZE.2	12	5	4	9	8	17	3	4	7	35
2009–10	HC Slovan Ústečtí Lvi	CZE.2	26	6	7	13	20	14	2	11	13	90
2009–10	BK Mladá Boleslav	ELH	2	0	0	0	0	—	—	—	—	—
2010–11	HC Slovan Ústečtí Lvi	CZE.2	21	3	3	6	22	—	—	—	—	—
2010–11	HC Vagnerplast Kladno	ELH	13	1	1	2	6	—	—	—	—	—
2011–12	Rytíři Kladno	ELH	52	14	18	32	42	3	1	0	1	4
2012–13	Rytíři Kladno	ELH	12	4	0	4	6	—	—	—	—	—
2012–13	HC Sparta Praha	ELH	40	8	13	21	22	6	0	1	1	6
2013–14	HC Energie Karlovy Vary	ELH	43	7	15	22	46	—	—	—	—	—
2014–15	Piráti Chomutov	CZE.2	49	26	28	54	66	11	3	7	10	42
2015–16	Piráti Chomutov	ELH	22	2	2	4	2	—	—	—	—	—
2015–16	HC Vítkovice Steel	ELH	28	6	4	10	44	—	—	—	—	—
2016–17	MsHK DOXXbet Žilina	Slovak	53	23	37	60	64	11	5	9	14	10
2017–18	HC Košice	Slovak	48	14	25	39	16	4	0	0	0	0
2018–19	Admiral Vladivostok	KHL	21	0	3	3	2	—	—	—	—	—
2018–19	HC Dynamo Pardubice	ELH	25	7	4	11	2	—	—	—	—	—
2019–20	HC Dynamo Pardubice	ELH	16	3	3	6	4	—	—	—	—	—
2019–20	Rytíři Kladno	ELH	18	1	2	3	4	—	—	—	—	—
2020–21	JKH GKS Jastrzębie	POL	35	21	30	51	44	13	0	5	5	24
2021–22	MHk 32 Liptovský Mikuláš	Slovak	44	6	22	28	54	—	—	—	—	—
2022–23	Vlci Žilina	SVK.2	14	5	7	12	6	—	—	—	—	—
2022–23	HC Košice	Slovak	9	2	2	4	0	17	0	4	4	6
2023–24	HK Spartak Dubnica nad Váhom	SVK.2	40	9	24	33	42	12	2	7	9	18
2024–25	HK Spartak Dubnica nad Váhom	SVK.2	34	15	23	38	80	13	5	7	12	32
2025–26	HK Spartak Dubnica nad Váhom	SVK.2	40	7	31	38	88	3	1	1	2	14
Slovak totals			435	89	149	238	375	37	5	13	18	16
ELH totals			275	53	62	115	174	9	1	1	2	10

=== International ===
Year	Team	Event	Result	GP	G	A	Pts	PIM
2012	Slovakia	WC	2nd place, silver medalist(s)	4	0	0	0	2
2018	Slovakia	OG	11th	4	0	0	0	4
2018	Slovakia	WC	9th	5	1	1	2	0
Senior totals				13	1	1	2	6

== Awards and honors ==
Award	Year
Slovak
Champion	2023
