= 2024–25 Slovenská hokejová liga season =

2024–25 TIPOS SHL season
- League: Slovenská hokejová liga
- Sport: Ice hockey
- Duration: 19 September 2024 – 24 April 2025
- Games: Regular season: 288; Postseason: 45
- Teams: 13

Regular season
- Season champions: HC Prešov
- Runners-up: HK MŠK Indian Žiar nad Hronom
- Promoted to Slovak Extraliga: HC Prešov
- Relegated to 2. hokejová liga: HK Steel Team Trebišov

Playoffs
- Finals champions: HC Prešov
- Runners-up: HK Skalica

Slovenská hokejová liga seasons
- ← 2023–24 2025–26 →

The 2024–25 TIPOS SHL season was the 32nd season of the Slovenská hokejová liga (second Slovak league). The league was officially known as 'TIPOS SHL' due to sponsorship by the TIPOS national lottery. The regular season ran from 19 September 2024 to 5 March 2025. HC Prešov finished atop the standings. The postseason ran from 8 March to 24 April 2025.

== Membership changes ==
- Vlci Žilina was promoted to the Slovak Extraliga and replaced by HC 19 Humenné.
- HKM Rimavská Sobota was relegated to the 2. hokejová liga and replaced by HK Detva.
- HK Levice, which had played the previous season in Poprad under the name AquaCity Pikes due to rink construction, returned to Levice and resumed their original name.

== Teams ==
2024–25 Slovenská hokejová liga teams.

| Team | City | Region | Arena | Coach |
|---|---|---|---|---|
| HC TEBS Bratislava | Bratislava | Bratislava | Zimný štadión Vladimíra Dzurillu | (Slovakia) Rudolf Jendek |
| HK Detva | Detva | Banská Bystrica | Zimný štadión Detva | (Slovakia) Richard Sechny (Slovakia) Juraj Ostrolucky |
| HK Spartak Dubnica nad Váhom | Dubnica nad Váhom | Trenčín | Zimný štadión Dubnica nad Váhom | (Slovakia) Roman Stantien |
| HC 19 Humenné | Humenné | Prešov | Humenné Ice Stadium | (Slovakia) Tibor Tartaľ |
| HK Levice | Levice | Nitra | Zimný štadión Levice | (Slovakia) Martin Baran |
| Slovakia U18 | Piešťany | Trnava | Patrícia Ice Arena 37 | (Slovakia) Martin Dendis |
| HK 95 Panthers Považská Bystrica | Považská Bystrica | Trenčín | Zimný štadión MSK Považská Bystrica | (Slovakia) Jakub Ruckay |
| HC 21 Prešov | Prešov | Prešov | Zimný štadión Prešov | (Canada) Steve Kasper (Slovakia) Ľubomír Hurtaj |
| HK 36 Skalica | Skalica | Trnava | Skalica Ice Stadium | (Czech Republic) Leo Gudas |
| HC Topoľčany | Topoľčany | Nitra | Topvar Aréna | (Slovakia) Vladimir Matejov |
| HK 2016 Trebišov | Trebišov | Košice | Trebišov Ice Stadium | (Slovakia) Dusan Kobela |
| HK Trnava | Trnava | Trnava | Zimný štadión Trnava | (Slovakia) Roman Kukumberg |
| HK MŠK Indian Žiar nad Hronom | Žiar nad Hronom | Banská Bystrica | Slovalco aréna | (Slovakia) Jerguš Bača |

== Standings ==
=== Regular season ===
| Pos | Team | Pld | W | OTW | OTL | L | GF | GA | GD | Pts | Qualification |
|---|---|---|---|---|---|---|---|---|---|---|---|
| 1 | HC 21 Prešov | 46 | 38 | 1 | 0 | 7 | 180 | 69 | +111 | 116 | Qualified to quarterfinals |
| 2 | HK MŠK Indian Žiar nad Hronom | 46 | 32 | 2 | 3 | 9 | 182 | 117 | +65 | 103 | Qualified to quarterfinals |
| 3 | HK Spartak Dubnica nad Váhom | 46 | 28 | 3 | 3 | 12 | 139 | 116 | +23 | 93 | Qualified to quarterfinals |
| 4 | HK 36 Skalica | 46 | 26 | 5 | 3 | 12 | 182 | 116 | +66 | 91 | Qualified to quarterfinals |
| 5 | HC 19 Humenné | 46 | 24 | 5 | 3 | 14 | 156 | 110 | +46 | 85 | Qualified to quarterfinals |
| 6 | HC Topoľčany | 46 | 18 | 7 | 3 | 18 | 165 | 154 | +11 | 71 | Qualified to quarterfinals |
| 7 | HK 95 Panthers Považská Bystrica | 46 | 19 | 3 | 7 | 17 | 146 | 140 | +6 | 70 | Qualified to eighthfinals |
| 8 | HK Levice | 46 | 13 | 5 | 6 | 22 | 149 | 164 | −15 | 55 | Qualified to eighthfinals |
| 9 | HK Detva | 46 | 13 | 5 | 4 | 24 | 127 | 167 | −40 | 53 | Qualified to eighthfinals |
| 10 | HC TEBS Bratislava | 46 | 11 | 5 | 4 | 26 | 124 | 168 | −44 | 47 | Qualified to eighthfinals |
| 11 | HK Trnava | 46 | 11 | 1 | 5 | 29 | 87 | 178 | −91 | 40 | |
| 12 | HK 2016 Trebišov | 46 | 5 | 5 | 6 | 30 | 100 | 168 | −68 | 31 | relegated |
| 13 | Slovakia U18 | 24 | 3 | 0 | 0 | 21 | 41 | 111 | −70 | 9 | Ineligible for Promotion and relegation |

Source: Standings
Rules for classification: 1) Points; 2) Head-to-head points.

=== Statistics ===
==== Scoring leaders ====
| Player | Team | Pos | GP | G | A | Pts | PIM |
|---|---|---|---|---|---|---|---|
| (Slovakia) Martin Jakúbek | HK MŠK Indian Žiar nad Hronom | LW/RW | 41 | 22 | 41 | 63 | 49 |
| (Ukraine) Alexander Peresunko | HC 21 Prešov | LW/RW | 44 | 29 | 25 | 54 | 2 |
| (Ukraine) Oleksandr Plokhotnik | HC Topoľčany | F | 42 | 19 | 33 | 52 | 4 |
| (Slovakia) Patrik Lušňák | HK 95 Panthers Považská Bystrica | LW/RW | 46 | 25 | 25 | 50 | 70 |
| (Slovakia) Radoslav Tybor | HK Spartak Dubnica nad Váhom | RW | 42 | 23 | 26 | 49 | 8 |
| (Finland) Aapo Alapuranen | HK Levice | F | 43 | 23 | 26 | 49 | 28 |
| (Russia) Igor Safaraleyev | HC 19 Humenné | LW | 42 | 20 | 29 | 49 | 51 |
| (Slovakia) Vladimir Vybiral | HC Topoľčany | LW | 43 | 20 | 29 | 49 | 6 |
| (Slovakia) Alex Kupka | HK Levice | RW | 44 | 19 | 29 | 48 | 18 |
| (Slovakia) David Gergel | HC Topoľčany | RW | 42 | 24 | 23 | 47 | 12 |
| (Slovakia) Filip Vasko | HC 19 Humenné | LW/RW | 45 | 17 | 30 | 47 | 20 |
| (Slovakia) Filip Vrábeľ | HC 19 Humenné | C/LW | 45 | 17 | 30 | 47 | 53 |

==== Leading goaltenders ====
The following goaltenders led the league in goals against average, provided that they have played at least 1/3 of their team's minutes.

| Player | Team | GP | TOI | W | L | GA | SV% | GAA |
|---|---|---|---|---|---|---|---|---|
| (Slovakia) Juraj Ovečka | HC 21 Prešov | 17 | 975 | 14 | 3 | 27 | .933 | 1.66 |
| (Slovakia) Patrik Lietava | HK Spartak Dubnica nad Váhom | 28 | 1626 | 18 | 10 | 55 | .940 | 2.03 |
| (Slovakia) Michal Vojvoda | HK 36 Skalica | 24 | 1422 | 14 | 10 | 56 | .923 | 2.36 |
| (Slovakia) Juraj Berzinec | HK 36 Skalica | 22 | 1328 | 17 | 5 | 55 | .930 | 2.49 |
| (Slovakia) Patrik Kozel | HC 19 Humenné | 21 | 1210 | 11 | 10 | 51 | .905 | 2.53 |

== Playoffs ==
=== Bracket ===
Eighthfinals (best-of-3)
7 | HK 95 Panthers Považská Bystrica | 0 | 2 | 3 | 1 | 3
10 | HC TEBS Bratislava | 1 | 5 | 1 | 0 | 0
8 | HK Levice | 3 | 5* | 3* | - | -
9 | HK Detva | 1 | 4 | 2 | - | -

Quarterfinals (best-of-7)
1 | HC 21 Prešov | 6 | 8 | 7 | 7 | - | - | -
10 | HK Levice | 1 | 4 | 3 | 2 | - | - | -
2 | HK MŠK Indian Žiar nad Hronom | 3* | 3 | 3 | 1 | 5 | 1 | -
7 | HK 95 Panthers Považská Bystrica | 2 | 4* | 4 | 6 | 2 | 4 | -
3 | HK Spartak Dubnica nad Váhom | 2 | 2 | 5 | 1 | 2 | 5 | -
6 | HC Topoľčany | 1 | 3 | 1 | 3 | 1 | 4 | -
4 | HK 36 Skalica | 1 | 5 | 3*^ | 4 | 4 | - | -
5 | HC 19 Humenné | 2 | 2 | 2 | 1 | 1 | - | -

Semifinals (best-of-7)
1 | HC 21 Prešov | 6 | 4*^ | 2 | 4*^ | - | - | -
7 | HK 95 Panthers Považská Bystrica | 1 | 3 | 1 | 3 | - | - | -
(Pairings are re-seeded after the first and second round)
3 | HK Spartak Dubnica nad Váhom | 6 | 2 | 1 | 3* | 2 | 4 | 1
4 | HK 36 Skalica | 2 | 6 | 3 | 2 | 3 | 1 | 2****

Championship (best-of-7)
1 | HC 21 Prešov | 4 | 6 | 1 | 5 | 4 | - | -
4 | HK 36 Skalica | 0 | 3 | 4 | 3 | 2 | - | -

Note: * denotes overtime period(s)
Note: ^ denotes shootout
