= Jānis Andersons =

Latvian ice hockey player (born 1986)

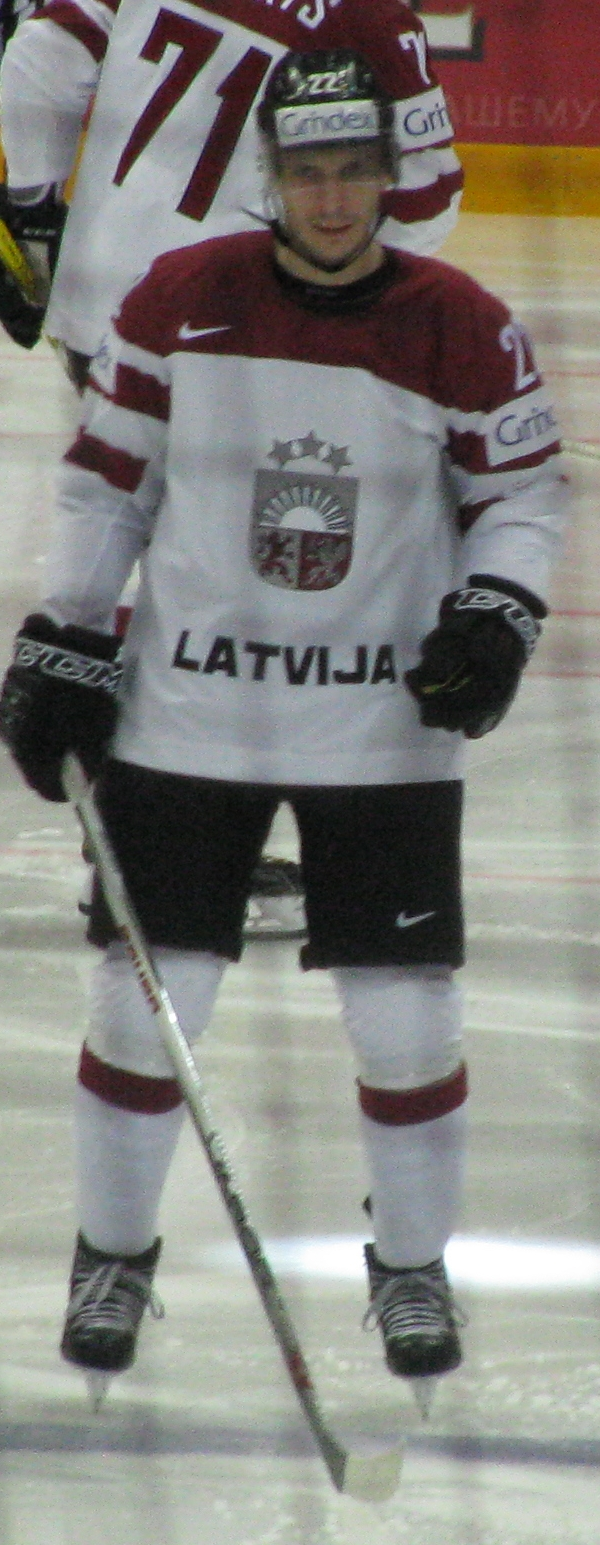
- Jānis Andersons
- Born: October 7, 1986 (age 39) Riga, Latvian SSR, Soviet Union
- Height: 6 ft 2 in (188 cm)
- Weight: 194 lb (88 kg; 13 st 12 lb)
- Position: Defence
- Shoots: Left
- Tipsport Liga team Former teams: Indian Žiar nad Hronom; Prizma Riga; HK Rīga; AIK; Almtuna IS; HC Vsetin; HC Trinec; Dinamo Riga; HK Dukla Trenčín; HKm Zvolen; MsHK Žilina; HC Nové Zámky; HC 07 Detva
- National team: Latvia
- Playing career: 2001–present

Jānis Andersons (born October 7, 1986) is a Latvian ice hockey defenceman, currently playing for Indian Žiar nad Hronom of the Slovak Hockey League.

== Career statistics ==
=== Regular season and playoffs ===
			Regular season					Playoffs
Season	Team	League	GP	G	A	Pts	PIM	GP	G	A	Pts	PIM
2001-02	Prizma Riga	Latvia	4	0	0	0	2	—	—	—	—	—
2001-02	Prizma Riga	EEHL Div.B	5	0	0	0	2	—	—	—	—	—
2002-03	HK Riga 2000	EEHL	4	0	0	0	0	—	—	—	—	—
2002-03	Prizma Riga	EEHL Div.B	12	0	2	2	0	—	—	—	—	—
2003-04	Stocksund U18	Sweden2 U18	1	0	0	0	0	—	—	—	—	—
2004-05	AIK	Sweden3	5	0	0	0	0	—	—	—	—	—
2004-05	AIK U20	Sweden U20	26	1	1	2	4	—	—	—	—	—
2005-06	Almtuna	Sweden2	3	0	0	0	0	—	—	—	—	—
2005-06	Almtuna U20	Sweden U20	32	3	8	11	6	2	0	0	0	0
2006-07	HK Riga 2000	Latvia	20	4	6	10	6	—	—	—	—	—
2006-07	HC Vsetin	Czech Republic	15	1	0	1	4	—	—	—	—	—
2007-08	HC Trinec	Czech Republic	46	1	0	1	4	7	0	0	0	2
2008-09	HC Trinec	Czech Republic	24	0	1	1	10	4	0	0	0	0
2008-09	HC Dukla Jihlava	Czech Republic2	16	2	5	7	4	—	—	—	—	—
2008-09	HC Havířov Panthers	Czech Republic2	1	0	0	0	0	—	—	—	—	—
2009-10	HC Trinec	Czech Republic	42	0	0	0	6	4	0	0	0	0
2009-10	HC Sumperk	Czech Republic2	8	1	1	2	4	—	—	—	—	—

=== International ===
Year	Team	Comp	GP	G	A	Pts	PIM
2003	Latvia	WJC18-D1	5	1	1	2	4
2004	Latvia	WJC18-D1	5	0	1	1	2
2005	Latvia	WJC-D1	5	0	1	1	2
2006	Latvia	WJC	6	0	1	1	2
2010	Latvia	WC	5	0	0	0	2
Junior int'l Totals			21	1	4	5	10
Senior int'l Totals			5	0	0	0	2
