= Ján Ťavoda =

Slovak ice hockey player

- Born: 23 September 1990 (age 34); Zvolen, Czechoslovakia
- Height: 191 cm (6 ft 3 in)
- Weight: 102 kg (225 lb; 16 st 1 lb)
- Position: Defence
- Shoots: Left
- team Former teams: Free agent HKM Zvolen; HK Orange 20; HC 07 Detva; Gornyak Rudny; HK Poprad; MsHK Žilina; HC ’05 Banská Bystrica; HK Dukla Michalovce; HC 21 Prešov; HC 19 Humenné
- Playing career: 2008–present

Ján Ťavoda (born 23 September 1990) is a Slovak professional ice hockey player. He is currently player of HC 19 Humenné .

== Career ==
Ťavoda previously played for HKm Zvolen, HC 07 Detva, MsHK Žilina, HC ’05 Banská Bystrica, HK Poprad and HK Dukla Michalovce. He also played in the Kazakhstan Hockey Championship for Gornyak Rudny.

== Career statistics ==
=== Regular season and playoffs ===
| | | | Regular season | | | | | Playoffs |
| Season | Team | League | GP | G | A | Pts | PIM | GP | G | A | Pts | PIM |
|---|---|---|---|---|---|---|---|---|---|---|---|---|
| 2007–08 | HKM Zvolen | Slovak-Jr. | 9 | 1 | 0 | 1 | 22 | — | — | — | — | — |
| 2008–09 | HKM Zvolen | Slovak-Jr. | 53 | 2 | 20 | 22 | 58 | — | — | — | — | — |
| 2008–09 | HK Orange 20 | Slovak | 8 | 0 | 1 | 1 | 10 | — | — | — | — | — |
| 2009–10 | HKM Zvolen | Slovak-Jr. | 38 | 8 | 10 | 18 | 77 | — | — | — | — | — |
| 2009–10 | HKM Zvolen | Slovak | 2 | 0 | 0 | 0 | 0 | 1 | 0 | 0 | 0 | 0 |
| 2010–11 | HKM Zvolen | Slovak-Jr. | 25 | 6 | 4 | 10 | 140 | 8 | 3 | 2 | 5 | 20 |
| 2010–11 | HC 07 Detva | Slovak.1 | 27 | 6 | 6 | 12 | 44 | 7 | 0 | 0 | 0 | 0 |
| 2011–12 | HKM Zvolen | Slovak | 53 | 0 | 4 | 4 | 83 | 6 | 0 | 1 | 1 | 39 |
| 2011–12 | HC 07 Detva | Slovak.1 | 7 | 1 | 1 | 2 | 28 | — | — | — | — | — |
| 2012–13 | HKM Zvolen | Slovak | 36 | 0 | 8 | 8 | 89 | 6 | 0 | 1 | 1 | 39 |
| 2013–14 | HKM Zvolen | Slovak | 55 | 1 | 4 | 5 | 62 | 4 | 0 | 0 | 0 | 39 |
| 2014–15 | Gornyak Rudny | Kazakh | 6 | 0 | 0 | 0 | 2 | — | — | — | — | — |
| 2014–15 | HKM Zvolen | Slovak | 44 | 2 | 7 | 9 | 124 | 5 | 0 | 1 | 1 | 12 |
| 2015–16 | HK Poprad | Slovak | 24 | 2 | 0 | 2 | 22 | — | — | — | — | — |
| 2015–16 | MsHK Žilina | Slovak | 25 | 3 | 9 | 12 | 83 | 3 | 0 | 0 | 0 | 2 |
| 2016–17 | HC ’05 Banská Bystrica | Slovak | 30 | 0 | 3 | 3 | 32 | — | — | — | — | — |
| 2016–17 | MsHK Žilina | Slovak | 8 | 1 | 0 | 1 | 37 | 11 | 1 | 2 | 3 | 43 |
| 2017–18 | HKM Zvolen | Slovak | 54 | 2 | 10 | 12 | 106 | 12 | 1 | 1 | 2 | 20 |
| 2018–19 | HK Poprad | Slovak | 50 | 3 | 5 | 8 | 90 | 10 | 1 | 0 | 1 | 39 |
| 2019–20 | HK Poprad | Slovak | 30 | 0 | 5 | 5 | 58 | — | — | — | — | — |
| 2019–20 | HK Dukla Michalovce | Slovak | 10 | 0 | 2 | 2 | 6 | — | — | — | — | — |
| 2020–21 | HK Dukla Michalovce | Slovak | 49 | 1 | 3 | 4 | 50 | 12 | 0 | 3 | 3 | 36 |
| 2021–22 | HK Dukla Michalovce | Slovak | 17 | 0 | 0 | 0 | 35 | — | — | — | — | — |
| 2021–22 | HC 21 Prešov | Slovak | 30 | 0 | 2 | 2 | 68 | — | — | — | — | — |
| Slovak totals | | | 525 | 15 | 63 | 78 | 955 | 64 | 3 | 8 | 11 | 230 |
