= 2019–20 Slovak 1. Liga season =

- League: (Slovakia) Slovak 1. Liga
- Sport: Ice hockey
- Duration: September 2019 – April 2020

Regular season
- League Champion: Bratislava Capitals

Playoffs

Slovak 1. Liga seasons
- 2018–19 2020–21

The 2019–20 Slovak 1. Liga season was the 27th season of the Slovak 1. Liga, the second level of ice hockey in Slovakia.

The season was ended prematurely due to the COVID-19 pandemic in Slovakia.

== Regular season ==
=== Standings ===
Each team played 36 games, playing each of the other nine teams fourth times. At the end of the regular season, the team that finished with the most points was crowned the league champion. Each 1HL team played two matches with SR 18 (1x at home and 1x outside) to support the preparation of the SR team for MS U18, I. div. sk. A 2020.

Pos	Team	Pld	W	OTW	OTL	L	GF	GA	GD	Pts	Qualification
1	Bratislava Capitals	37	28	1	4	4	190	78	+112	90	Qualification to Group 1–6
2	Topoľčany	37	20	8	2	7	128	91	+37	78	Qualification to Group 1–6
3	Martin	37	21	3	4	9	141	103	+38	73	Qualification to Group 1–6
4	Dubnica	37	17	5	2	13	119	115	+4	63	Qualification to Group 1–6
5	Skalica	37	16	3	3	15	129	109	+20	57	Qualification to Group 1–6
6	Spišská Nová Ves	37	16	2	3	16	121	127	−6	55	Qualification to Group 1–6
7	Žilina	37	14	3	3	17	107	116	−9	51	Qualification to Group 7–10
8	Levice	37	12	2	3	20	121	144	−23	43	Qualification to Group 7–10
9	Považská Bystrica	37	9	2	3	23	93	141	−48	34	Qualification to Group 7–10
10	Trnava	37	7	0	2	28	106	194	−88	23	Qualification to Group 7–10
	SR 18	11	1	0	0	10	18	56	−38	3	

Source: Slovak 1. Liga
Rules for classification: 1) Points; 2) Head-to-head points

=== Group 1–6 ===
Pos	Team	Pld	W	OTW	OTL	L	GF	GA	GD	Pts	Qualification
1	Bratislava Capitals	48	36	1	5	6	233	106	+127	115	Qualification to Quarter-finals
2	Martin	48	29	3	4	12	178	126	+52	97	Qualification to Quarter-finals
3	Topoľčany	48	23	10	2	13	157	126	+31	91	Qualification to Quarter-finals
4	Skalica	48	21	4	4	19	166	143	+23	75	Qualification to Quarter-finals
5	Dubnica	48	20	5	3	20	146	152	−6	73	Qualification to Quarter-finals
6	Spišská Nová Ves	48	21	3	4	20	159	156	+3	73	Qualification to Quarter-finals
	SR 18	16	1	0	0	15	27	89	−62	3	

Source: Slovak 1. Liga
Rules for classification: 1) Points; 2) Head-to-head points

=== Group 7–10 ===
Pos	Team	Pld	W	OTW	OTL	L	GF	GA	GD	Pts	Qualification
7	Žilina	50	26	3	3	18	177	136	+41	87	Qualification to Quarter-finals
8	Levice	50	19	3	3	25	170	184	−14	66	Qualification to Quarter-finals
9	Považská Bystrica	50	12	3	5	30	128	191	−63	47	
10	Trnava	50	9	1	4	36	140	260	−120	33	
	SR 18	13	1	1	0	11	20	68	−48	5	

Source: Slovak 1. Liga
Rules for classification: 1) Points; 2) Head-to-head points

== Playoffs ==
Eight teams qualify for the playoffs. The playoffs were cancelled as a result of the COVID-19 pandemic in Slovakia.

=== Bracket ===
Quarter-finals (best-of-7)
1	Bratislava Capitals	4
8	Levice	0
4	Skalica	2
5	Dubnica	2
(Pairings are reseeded after the first round)
2	Martin	4
7	Žilina	0
3	Topoľčany	3
6	Spišská Nová Ves	1

Semi-finals (best-of-7)
1	Bratislava Capitals
2	Martin

Finals (best-of-7)

=== Quarter-finals ===
Bratislava Capitals – Levice 4-0
4.3.2020	Bratislava Capitals	Levice	5-2
5.3.2020	Bratislava Capitals	Levice	7-1
8.3.2020	Levice	Bratislava Capitals	2-3
9.3.2020	Levice	Bratislava Capitals	0-4
Bratislava Capitals wins the series 4-0.

Topoľčany – Spišská Nová Ves 3-1
4.3.2020	Topoľčany	Spišská Nová Ves	3-0
5.3.2020	Topoľčany	Spišská Nová Ves	3-2
8.3.2020	Spišská Nová Ves	Topoľčany	3-2
9.3.2020	Spišská Nová Ves	Topoľčany	1-5

Martin – Žilina 4-0
4.3.2020	Martin	Žilina	2-1
5.3.2020	Martin	Žilina	3-2 OT1
8.3.2020	Žilina	Martin	3-4
9.3.2020	Žilina	Martin	0-6
Martin wins the series 4-0.

Skalica – Dubnica 2-2
4.3.2020	Skalica	Dubnica	4-5 SO
5.3.2020	Skalica	Dubnica	2-1
8.3.2020	Dubnica	Skalica	5-2
9.3.2020	Dubnica	Skalica	2-4
