= Hunter Fejes =

American ice hockey player (born 1994)

- Born: May 31, 1994 (age 32) Anchorage, Alaska, U.S.
- Height: 6 ft 1 in (185 cm)
- Weight: 190 lb (86 kg; 13 st 8 lb)
- Position: Winger
- Shot: Left
- Played for: Springfield Falcons; Tucson Roadrunners; Rapid City Rush; Wheeling Nailers; Orlando Solar Bears; Toronto Marlies; Rockford IceHogs; Manitoba Moose; Hershey Bears; Black Wings Linz; Graz 99ers HC Vita Hästen; Orli Znojmo; HC Košice; Vlci Žilina; HC Prešov; HC Dynamo Pardubice
- NHL draft: 178th overall, 2012; Phoenix Coyotes
- Playing career: 2015–2026

Samuel Hunter Fejes (born May 31, 1994) is an American former professional ice hockey winger. After several seasons in the AHL and ECHL, he played in Europe, winning the Slovak Extraliga title with HC Košice in 2023 and the Czech Extraliga title with HC Dynamo Pardubice in 2026.

== Biography ==
Fejes was born in Anchorage, Alaska. His ancestors came to the US from Slovakia. When he was 10 years old, he was involved in a car crash on the way home from a training that resulted in the death of his mother and left Fejes comatose for weeks.

In April 2022 he was diagnosed with Hodgkin lymphoma. After three months of rigorous chemotherapy treatment, the cancer entered remission and in October he was cancer free.

== Playing career ==
=== Early career and North America ===
At the junior level, Fejes played for Shattuck-Saint Mary's and then for four seasons at Colorado College in the National Collegiate Athletic Association. In the 2012 NHL entry draft, he was selected 178th overall by the Phoenix Coyotes, but never played in the NHL. Before joining HC Košice he played for a variety of AHL and ECHL teams, as well as overseas in Sweden, the Czech Republic and Austria.

=== Slovakia ===
He joined Košice right before the playoff phase of the 2022–23 Slovak Extraliga season. At first, he was unsure whether he should accept the offer from Košice, but was persuaded by his Orlando teammate Maxim Čajkovič, who is originally from Slovakia. Fejes signed a contract extension with Košice in June 2023 and recorded 41 points in 45 regular-season games in 2023–24, also appearing for the club in the Champions Hockey League.

In August 2024 he moved to Vlci Žilina, which had just won promotion back to the Extraliga. He had his most productive Slovak season there, scoring 24 goals and 47 points in 49 regular-season games. The newly promoted team reached the league semifinals, where it lost to defending champion HK Nitra in a seventh game on April 15, 2025, and took the bronze medal.

In June 2025 Fejes signed with HC Prešov, where he served as an alternate captain and recorded 11 points in 16 games.

=== Pardubice and retirement ===
On December 6, 2025, Prešov loaned Fejes to HC Dynamo Pardubice of the Czech Extraliga, and the move was made permanent in January 2026. In the sixth game of the final against HC Oceláři Třinec on April 28, 2026, he scored his first Czech Extraliga playoff goal, in his seventh playoff game, as Pardubice won 5–4 in overtime to clinch the series 4–2 and the club's first championship in 14 years. He signed a contract extension with Pardubice after the title and played in two Champions Hockey League games for the club in September 2026.

Fejes announced his retirement from professional hockey in October 2026.

== Career statistics ==
=== Regular season and playoffs ===
			Regular season					Playoffs
Season	Team	League	GP	G	A	Pts	PIM	GP	G	A	Pts	PIM
2009–10	Shattuck-Saint Mary's	18U AA	55	32	33	65	24	—	—	—	—	—
2010–11	Shattuck-Saint Mary's	USHS-Prep	49	14	14	28	12	—	—	—	—	—
2011–12	Shattuck-Saint Mary's	USHS-Prep	55	38	40	78	20	—	—	—	—	—
2012–13	Colorado College	WCHA	41	8	6	14	8	—	—	—	—	—
2013–14	Colorado College	NCHC	26	0	1	1	29	—	—	—	—	—
2014–15	Colorado College	NCHC	35	5	14	19	31	—	—	—	—	—
2015–16	Colorado College	NCHC	36	13	9	22	27	—	—	—	—	—
2015–16	Springfield Falcons	AHL	10	0	0	0	2	—	—	—	—	—
2016–17	Tucson Roadrunners	AHL	19	1	4	5	21	—	—	—	—	—
2016–17	Rapid City Rush	ECHL	48	18	20	38	20	—	—	—	—	—
2017–18	Wheeling Nailers	ECHL	32	16	11	27	38	—	—	—	—	—
2017–18	Orlando Solar Bears	ECHL	35	14	18	32	47	9	3	6	9	7
2017–18	Toronto Marlies	AHL	4	0	0	0	0	—	—	—	—	—
2018–19	Orlando Solar Bears	ECHL	12	8	7	15	17	8	7	1	8	2
2018–19	Rockford IceHogs	AHL	7	0	0	0	16	—	—	—	—	—
2018–19	Manitoba Moose	AHL	42	3	5	8	8	—	—	—	—	—
2018–19	Hershey Bears	AHL	—	—	—	—	—	1	0	0	0	0
2019–20	Orlando Solar Bears	ECHL	15	4	6	10	6	—	—	—	—	—
2019–20	Manitoba Moose	AHL	7	0	1	1	2	—	—	—	—	—
2019–20	Black Wings Linz	EBEL	24	13	8	21	4	3	2	1	3	0
2020–21	Graz 99ers	ICEHL	34	10	16	26	16	—	—	—	—	—
2020–21	HC Vita Hästen	Allsv	17	5	5	10	36	—	—	—	—	—
2021–22	Orli Znojmo	ICEHL	23	6	7	13	4	—	—	—	—	—
2021–22	Orlando Solar Bears	ECHL	27	10	8	18	24	—	—	—	—	—
2022–23	Orlando Solar Bears	ECHL	21	7	10	17	6	—	—	—	—	—
2022–23	HC Košice	Slovak	7	6	4	10	4	17	6	5	11	29
2023–24	HC Košice	Slovak	45	20	21	41	41	10	4	0	4	12
2024–25	Vlci Žilina	Slovak	49	24	23	47	59	11	3	1	4	35
2025–26	HC Prešov	Slovak	16	4	7	11	6	—	—	—	—	—
2025–26	HC Dynamo Pardubice	ELH	17	2	2	4	6	7	1	0	1	0
2025–26	HC Dynamo Pardubice B	Czech.1	4	2	1	3	0	—	—	—	—	—
AHL totals			89	4	10	14	49	1	0	0	0	0
ECHL totals			190	77	80	157	158	17	10	7	17	9
Slovak totals			117	54	55	109	110	38	13	6	19	76
ELH totals			17	2	2	4	6	7	1	0	1	0

== Awards and honors ==
Award	Year
Slovak
Champion	2023
Czech
Champion	2026
