= David Růžička =

Czech ice hockey player

- Born: 8 March 1988 (age 37)
- Height: 6 ft 3 in (191 cm)
- Weight: 183 lb (83 kg; 13 st 1 lb)
- Position: Defence
- Shoots: Left
- Slovak 1. Liga team Former teams: Vlci Žilina; HC Kladno; HC Berounští Medvědi; HC Benátky nad Jizerou; SK Kadaň; HK Lev Slaný; IHC Písek; Piráti Chomutov; Shakhtyor Soligorsk; HKM Zvolen; HC Košice; HC 21 Prešov
- Playing career: 2005–present

David Růžička (born 8 March 1988) is a Czech professional ice hockey defenceman currently playing for Vlci Žilina of the Slovak 1. Liga.

He played with HC Kladno in the Czech Extraliga during the 2010–11 Czech Extraliga season.

== Career statistics ==
=== Regular season and playoffs ===
			Regular season					Playoffs
Season	Team	League	GP	G	A	Pts	PIM	GP	G	A	Pts	PIM

=== International ===
Year	Team	Event	Result	GP	G	A	Pts	PIM
