= Ján Sýkora =

Slovak ice hockey player

- Born: September 14, 1990 (age 34); Detva, Czechoslovakia
- Height: 6 ft 3 in (191 cm)
- Weight: 176 lb (80 kg; 12 st 8 lb)
- Position: Left wing
- Shoots: Left
- Slovak team Former teams: HC 21 Prešov; HC ’05 Banská Bystrica; HC 07 Detva; HK Orange 20; HK Brezno; HC Škoda Plzeň; BK Havlíčkův Brod; HC Oceláři Třinec; HC Klatovy; HC Dynamo Pardubice; HC Frýdek-Místek; HC Košice
- NHL draft: Undrafted
- Playing career: 2008–present

Ján Sýkora (born September 14, 1990) is a Slovak professional ice hockey player. He is currently playing for HC 21 Prešov of the Slovak Extraliga.

Sýkora made his Czech Extraliga debut playing with HC Plzeň during the 2013-14 Czech Extraliga season.

== Career statistics ==
=== Regular season and playoffs ===
			Regular season					Playoffs
Season	Team	League	GP	G	A	Pts	PIM	GP	G	A	Pts	PIM
2006–07	HC '05 Banská Bystrica	Slovak-Jr.	3	2	2	4	2	—	—	—	—	—
2007–08	HC '05 Banská Bystrica	Slovak-Jr.	13	1	2	3	14	—	—	—	—	—
2008–09	HC '05 Banská Bystrica	Slovak-Jr.	38	18	23	41	36	—	—	—	—	—
2008–09	HC '05 Banská Bystrica	Slovak	2	0	0	0	0	—	—	—	—	—
2008–09	HC 07 Detva	Slovak.1	4	2	1	3	0	—	—	—	—	—
2008–09	HK Orange 20	Slovak	11	3	1	4	10	—	—	—	—	—
2009–10	HC '05 Banská Bystrica	Slovak-Jr.	7	5	2	7	10	—	—	—	—	—
2009–10	HC '05 Banská Bystrica	Slovak	11	1	2	3	4	—	—	—	—	—
2009–10	HK Brezno	Slovak.1	5	4	3	7	2	—	—	—	—	—
2009–10	HK Orange 20	Slovak	20	2	1	3	12	—	—	—	—	—
2010–11	HC '05 Banská Bystrica	Slovak	44	17	16	33	42	14	3	2	5	8
2011–12	HC '05 Banská Bystrica	Slovak	29	11	9	20	18	4	2	1	3	4
2012–13	HC '05 Banská Bystrica	Slovak	42	19	15	34	32	5	2	0	2	4
2013–14	HC Škoda Plzeň	Czech	41	7	8	15	24	5	2	0	2	0
2014–15	HC Škoda Plzeň	Czech	49	20	20	40	32	4	1	2	3	2
2014–15	BK Havlíčkův Brod	Czech.1	3	1	0	1	2	—	—	—	—	—
2015–16	HC Škoda Plzeň	Czech	27	5	6	11	12	—	—	—	—	—
2015–16	HC Oceláři Třinec	Czech	10	4	1	5	6	—	—	—	—	—
2015–16	HC Klatovy	Czech.2	1	3	1	4	0	—	—	—	—	—
2016–17	HC Oceláři Třinec	Czech	24	4	0	4	8	—	—	—	—	—
2016–17	HC Dynamo Pardubice	Czech	11	4	0	4	10	—	—	—	—	—
2016–17	HC Frýdek-Místek	Czech.1	16	2	0	2	22	—	—	—	—	—
2017–18	HC Dynamo Pardubice	Czech	36	6	1	7	18	6	1	1	2	0
2018–19	HC '05 Banská Bystrica	Slovak	38	12	15	27	12	—	—	—	—	—
2018–19	HC Košice	Slovak	10	2	5	7	4	6	1	2	3	16
2019–20	HC 07 Detva	Slovak	33	16	16	32	45	—	—	—	—	—
2020–21	HC 07 Detva	Slovak	43	19	18	37	56	3	0	0	0	0
Slovak totals			283	102	98	200	235	32	8	5	13	32
Czech totals			198	50	36	86	110	15	4	3	7	2
