= Ondrej Mikula =

Slovak ice hockey winger

- Born: July 3, 1988 (age 37) Bánovce nad Bebravou, Czechoslovakia
- Height: 5 ft 11 in (180 cm)
- Weight: 176 lb (80 kg; 12 st 8 lb)
- Position: Winger
- Shoots: Left
- Slovak 1. Liga team Former teams: Vlci Žilina; HC Vítkovice; MHk 32 Liptovský Mikuláš; MHC Martin; HK Dukla Trenčín; HC Shakhtyor Soligorsk; HC '05 Banská Bystrica; Yertis Pavlodar; ŠHK 37 Piešťany; HK Poprad; Comarch Cracovia
- Playing career: 2006–present

Ondrej Mikula (born July 3, 1988) is a Slovak professional ice hockey winger who currently plays for Vlci Žilina of the Slovak 1. Liga.

Mikula previously played in the Czech Extraliga for HC Vítkovice and in the Tipsport Liga for MHk 32 Liptovský Mikuláš, MHC Martin, HK Dukla Trenčín, HC '05 Banská Bystrica, ŠHK 37 Piešťany and HK Poprad.

On August 22, 2019, Mikula joined Comarch Cracovia of the Polska Hokej Liga. On July 11, 2020, Mikula returned to Slovakia to sign for Vlci Žilina of the Slovak 1. Liga.
