= Marco Halama =

Slovak ice hockey player

- Born: January 2, 1996 (age 30) Zvolen, Slovakia
- Height: 5 ft 9 in (175 cm)
- Weight: 176 lb (80 kg; 12 st 8 lb)
- Position: Centre
- Shoots: Left
- Slovak 1. Liga team Former teams: Vlci Žilina; HC Slovan Bratislava; HKM Zvolen; Bratislava Capitals; HC Prešov; HK Spišská Nová Ves
- Playing career: 2016–present

Marco Halama (born January 2, 1996) is a Slovak professional ice hockey centre who plays professionally for Vlci Žilina of the Slovak 1. Liga.

== Career ==
Halama previously played for HC Slovan Bratislava of the Kontinental Hockey League, playing eight games during the 2016–17 season before joining HKM Zvolen later in the season. He then joined HC Bratislava of the Slovak 1. Liga in 2017 before returning to Zvolen on September 2, 2018.

== Career statistics ==
=== Regular season and playoffs ===
			Regular season					Playoffs
Season	Team	League	GP	G	A	Pts	PIM	GP	G	A	Pts	PIM

=== International ===
Year	Team	Event	Result	GP	G	A	Pts	PIM
2013	Slovakia	U17	10th	5	0	1	1	0
2014	Slovakia	WJC18	8th	5	1	1	2	4
Junior totals				10	1	2	3	4

== Awards and honors ==
Award	Year
Slovak
Champion	2021
