= Róbert Varga (ice hockey) =

Slovak ice hockey player

- Born: 3 April 1995 (age 31) Bratislava, Slovakia
- Height: 5 ft 11 in (180 cm)
- Weight: 181 lb (82 kg; 12 st 13 lb)
- Position: Left wing
- Shoots: Left
- Slovak Extraliga team Former teams: HC Slovan Bratislava; Vlci Žilina; HK Trnava; Vaasan Sport; MHC Martin; HC Nové Zámky; HC '05 Banská Bystrica; MHk 32 Liptovský Mikuláš; Bratislava Capitals; HC Topoľčany; HK Nitra
- NHL draft: Undrafted
- Playing career: 2015–present

Róbert Varga (born 3 April 1995) is a Slovak professional ice hockey player currently playing for HC Slovan Bratislava of the Slovak Extraliga

== Career ==
Varga made his senior debut for the MHC Martin during the 2015–16 season, when he played 41 games with three goals.

== Career statistics ==
=== Regular season and playoffs ===
			Regular season					Playoffs
Season	Team	League	GP	G	A	Pts	PIM	GP	G	A	Pts	PIM
2011–12	HK Trnava	Slovak-Jr.	27	9	14	23	8	—	—	—	—	—
2012–13	Vaasan Sport	Jr. A	48	12	15	27	12	3	1	1	2	0
2013–14	Vaasan Sport	Jr. A	46	20	24	44	42	—	—	—	—	—
2014–15	Vaasan Sport	Jr. A	48	18	28	46	36	—	—	—	—	—
2015–16	MHC Martin	Slovak-Jr.	15	26	10	36	8	9	5	11	16	10
2015–16	MHC Martin	Slovak	39	3	0	3	6	2	0	0	0	0
2016–17	MHC Martin	Slovak	43	11	12	23	10	11	4	3	7	10
2016–17	MHC Martin B	Slovak.1	11	10	8	18	2	—	—	—	—	—
2017–18	HC Nové Zámky	Slovak	55	6	7	13	20	4	1	0	1	2
2017–18	HC Nové Zámky B	Slovak.1	6	5	6	11	0	—	—	—	—	—
2018–19	HC '05 Banská Bystrica	Slovak	37	3	6	9	42	—	—	—	—	—
2018–19	MHk 32 Liptovský Mikuláš	Slovak	15	3	1	4	6	—	—	—	—	—
2019–20	Bratislava Capitals	Slovak.1	48	24	34	58	32	—	—	—	—	—
2020–21	HC Topoľčany	Slovak.1	38	31	17	48	24	4	0	2	2	16
Slovak totals			189	26	26	52	84	17	5	3	8	12

=== International ===
Year	Team	Event	Result	GP	G	A	Pts	PIM
2013	Slovakia	WJC18	9th	6	1	4	5	4
Junior totals				6	1	4	5	4
