= Martin Belluš =

- Born: 2 December 1991 (age 33); Spišská Nová Ves, Czechoslovakia
- Height: 6 ft 3 in (191 cm)
- Weight: 190 lb (86 kg; 13 st 8 lb)
- Position: Right wing
- Shoots: Right
- Slovak 1. Liga team Former teams: Vlci Žilina; HK Spišská Nová Ves; KH Sanok; HK Poprad; Yertis Pavlodar; ŠHK 37 Piešťany; HC '05 Banská Bystrica; HC 07 Detva; HC Košice; HC Slovan Bratislava; HK Dukla Trenčín; HC Dynamo Pardubice B
- NHL draft: Undrafted
- Playing career: 2010–present

Martin Belluš (born 2 December 1991) is a Slovak professional ice hockey player who is currently playing for Vlci Žilina of the Slovak 1. Liga.

== Career statistics ==
=== Regular season and playoffs ===
| | | | Regular season | | | | | Playoffs |
| Season | Team | League | GP | G | A | Pts | PIM | GP | G | A | Pts | PIM |
|---|---|---|---|---|---|---|---|---|---|---|---|---|
| 2008–09 | HK Spišská Nová Ves | Slovak-Jr. | 8 | 4 | 1 | 5 | 12 | — | — | — | — | — |
| 2009–10 | HK Spišská Nová Ves | Slovak-Jr. | 54 | 21 | 26 | 47 | 106 | — | — | — | — | — |
| 2010–11 | HK Spišská Nová Ves | Slovak-Jr. | 37 | 34 | 26 | 60 | 93 | — | — | — | — | — |
| 2010–11 | HK Spišská Nová Ves | Slovak.1 | 28 | 2 | 3 | 5 | 47 | 2 | 0 | 0 | 0 | 4 |
| 2011–12 | Tatranskí Vlci | MHL | 56 | 10 | 9 | 19 | 137 | — | — | — | — | — |
| 2012–13 | HK Spišská Nová Ves | Slovak.1 | 22 | 6 | 5 | 11 | 10 | — | — | — | — | — |
| 2012–13 | KH Sanok | PLH | 1 | 0 | 0 | 0 | 2 | 10 | 2 | 1 | 3 | 4 |
| 2013–14 | HK Poprad | Slovak | 55 | 6 | 10 | 16 | 73 | 5 | 1 | 0 | 1 | 2 |
| 2014–15 | Yertis Pavlodar | KAZ | 50 | 9 | 12 | 21 | 99 | 14 | 2 | 5 | 7 | 8 |
| 2015–16 | ŠHK 37 Piešťany | Slovak | 51 | 8 | 11 | 19 | 168 | — | — | — | — | — |
| 2016–17 | Indy Fuel | ECHL | 7 | 0 | 2 | 2 | 4 | — | — | — | — | — |
| 2016–17 | HC '05 Banská Bystrica | Slovak | 24 | 3 | 3 | 6 | 67 | 10 | 2 | 3 | 5 | 41 |
| 2017–18 | HC '05 Banská Bystrica | Slovak | 24 | 1 | 2 | 3 | 18 | — | — | — | — | — |
| 2017–18 | HC 07 Detva | Slovak | 21 | 8 | 6 | 14 | 40 | — | — | — | — | — |
| 2018–19 | HC '05 Banská Bystrica | Slovak | 4 | 0 | 0 | 0 | 2 | — | — | — | — | — |
| 2018–19 | HK Poprad | Slovak | 46 | 10 | 12 | 22 | 77 | 12 | 3 | 1 | 4 | 6 |
| 2019–20 | HC Košice | Slovak | 44 | 5 | 11 | 16 | 66 | — | — | — | — | — |
| 2020–21 | HC Košice | Slovak | 47 | 8 | 13 | 21 | 102 | 4 | 0 | 0 | 0 | 43 |
| 2021–22 | HC Košice | Slovak | 13 | 1 | 3 | 4 | 6 | — | — | — | — | — |
| 2021–22 | HC Slovan Bratislava | Slovak | 21 | 2 | 3 | 5 | 43 | 13 | 1 | 3 | 4 | 37 |
| 2022–23 | HK Dukla Trenčín | Slovak | 11 | 1 | 1 | 2 | 12 | — | — | — | — | — |
| 2022–23 | HC Dynamo Pardubice B | Czech.1 | 14 | 1 | 2 | 3 | 35 | — | — | — | — | — |
| 2022–23 | HK Spišská Nová Ves | Slovak | 7 | 0 | 0 | 0 | 8 | 10 | 1 | 0 | 1 | 20 |
| Slovak totals | | | 368 | 53 | 75 | 128 | 682 | 54 | 8 | 7 | 15 | 149 |

== Awards and honors ==
| Award | Year |
Kazakhstan
| Champion | 2015 |
Slovak
| Champion | 2017, 2022 |
