= Lukáš Paukovček =

Slovak ice hockey player

- Born: 13 November 1990 (age 35) Liptovský Mikuláš, Czechoslovakia
- Height: 185 cm (6 ft 1 in)
- Weight: 91 kg (201 lb; 14 st 5 lb)
- Position: Forward
- Shoots: Left
- Slovak 1. Liga team Former teams: Vlci Žilina; MHk 32 Liptovský Mikuláš; HK Poprad; HK Nitra; HK Dukla Trenčín; HC '05 Banská Bystrica
- Playing career: 2008–present

Lukáš Paukovček (born 13 November 1990) is a Slovak professional ice hockey player who currently playing for Vlci Žilina of the Slovak 1. Liga.

== Career statistics ==
=== Regular season and playoffs ===
			Regular season					Playoffs
Season	Team	League	GP	G	A	Pts	PIM	GP	G	A	Pts	PIM
2008–09	MHk 32 Liptovský Mikuláš	Slovak-Jr.	48	13	20	33	146	—	—	—	—	—
2008–09	MHk 32 Liptovský Mikuláš	Slovak	2	0	0	0	0	—	—	—	—	—
2009–10	MHk 32 Liptovský Mikuláš	Slovak-Jr.	33	20	16	36	82	—	—	—	—	—
2009–10	MHk 32 Liptovský Mikuláš	Slovak	5	0	0	0	0	—	—	—	—	—
2010–11	MHk 32 Liptovský Mikuláš	Slovak-Jr.	8	9	4	13	2	1	0	0	0	0
2010–11	MHk 32 Liptovský Mikuláš	Slovak.1	14	4	6	10	24	12	5	2	7	20
2011–12	MHk 32 Liptovský Mikuláš	Slovak.1	42	14	16	30	86	1	0	1	1	0
2012–13	MHk 32 Liptovský Mikuláš	Slovak.1	38	20	24	44	62	5	2	5	7	46
2013–14	HK Poprad	Slovak	46	5	13	18	24	4	0	1	1	2
2014–15	HK Poprad	Slovak	54	7	17	24	126	12	3	3	6	8
2015–16	HK Poprad	Slovak	54	13	14	27	88	4	1	0	1	4
2016–17	HK Nitra	Slovak	52	4	9	13	89	13	3	2	5	16
2017–18	MHk 32 Liptovský Mikuláš	Slovak	44	5	11	16	40	—	—	—	—	—
2018–19	HK Poprad	Slovak	49	11	19	30	74	12	1	2	3	28
2019–20	HK Poprad	Slovak	33	5	6	11	30	—	—	—	—	—
2019–20	HK Dukla Trenčín	Slovak	17	7	7	14	68	—	—	—	—	—
2020–21	HK Dukla Trenčín	Slovak	41	9	21	30	42	10	3	5	8	16
2021–22	HK Dukla Trenčín	Slovak	35	6	13	19	22	—	—	—	—	—
2021–22	HC '05 Banská Bystrica	Slovak	9	0	1	1	6	6	0	0	0	6
2022–23	HK Poprad	Slovak	33	3	3	6	20	—	—	—	—	—
Slovak totals			474	75	134	209	629	61	11	13	24	80
