= Peter Galamboš =

Slovak ice hockey player

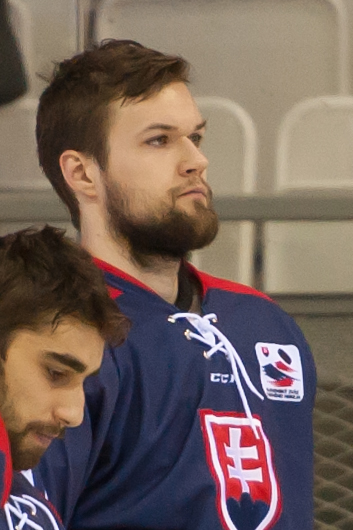
- Born: 14 June 1989 (age 35); Martin, Czechoslovakia
- Height: 191 cm (6 ft 3 in)
- Weight: 90 kg (198 lb; 14 st 2 lb)
- Position: Forward
- Shoots: Left
- Slovak 1. Liga team Former teams: Vlci Žilina; HK Martin; HC Bílí Tygři Liberec; HC Benátky nad Jizerou; HC '05 Banská Bystrica; Motor České Budějovice; HC Košice; HK Dukla Michalovce
- National team: Slovakia
- NHL draft: Undrafted
- Playing career: 2007–present

Peter Galamboš (born 14 June 1989) is a Slovak professional ice hockey player who currently playing for Vlci Žilina of the Slovak 1. Liga.

== Career statistics ==
=== Regular season and playoffs ===
			Regular season					Playoffs
Season	Team	League	GP	G	A	Pts	PIM	GP	G	A	Pts	PIM
Czech totals			43	4	3	7	2	—	—	—	—	—
Slovak totals			453	94	148	242	203	38	3	12	15	22
