= Ryan Dmowski =

American ice hockey player (born 1997)

- Born: March 18, 1997 (age 29) East Lyme, Connecticut, U.S.
- Height: 6 ft 2 in (188 cm)
- Weight: 209 lb (95 kg; 14 st 13 lb)
- Position: Winger
- Shoots: Left
- Slovak Extraliga team Former teams: HC Slovan Bratislava; Hartford Wolf Pack; Hershey Bears; HK Poprad
- Playing career: 2018–present

Ryan Dmowski (born March 18, 1997) is an American professional ice hockey winger who is currently playing for HC Slovan Bratislava of Tipsport liga.

== Biography ==
Dmowski was born in East Lyme, Connecticut, native played for the Providence Capitals and frequented Schneider Arena in Rhode Island's capital city as a youngster. Like many New Englanders was introduced to college hockey at a pretty early age, at UMass Lowell. Dmowski's hockey journey, which brought him from East Lyme, to UMass Lowell, started at the RoseGarden Ice Arena in Norwich, where Connecticut hockey guru Bernie Cassell – once a skills coach with the Bridgeport Sound Tigers who now holds the same position with the New York Islanders – taught Dmowski the basics of the sport. From there he bounced around: The Gunnery, the Southeastern Seahawks in Norwich, the Connecticut Capitals in Newington, the Providence Capitals in Rhode Island.

After four year he has signed an AHL contract with Hartford Wolf Pack. In the 2018–19 season played 10 games with one goal and three assist. In next two season he played another 36 games, when he scored 4 goals. Before joining HK Poprad he played in also for Hershey Bears of AHL and variety of ECHL hockey team.

He joined Poprad before of the 2023–24 Slovak Extraliga season.

== Career statistics ==
=== Regular season and playoffs ===
Bold indicates led league

			Regular season					Playoffs
Season	Team	League	GP	G	A	Pts	PIM	GP	G	A	Pts	PIM
2013–14	Des Moines Buccaneers	USHL	5	0	2	2	4	—	—	—	—	—
2014–15	Des Moines Buccaneers	USHL	57	23	16	39	24	—	—	—	—	—
2015–16	University of Massachusetts Lowell	HE	26	4	9	13	16	—	—	—	—	—
2016–17	University of Massachusetts Lowell	HE	34	8	1	9	10	—	—	—	—	—
2017–18	University of Massachusetts Lowell	HE	35	11	11	22	12	—	—	—	—	—
2018–19	University of Massachusetts Lowell	HE	37	14	9	23	16	—	—	—	—	—
2018–19	Hartford Wolf Pack	AHL	10	1	3	4	4	—	—	—	—	—
2019–20	Hartford Wolf Pack	AHL	31	4	2	6	13	—	—	—	—	—
2019–20	Maine Mariners	ECHL	12	3	4	7	14	—	—	—	—	—
2020–21	Hartford Wolf Pack	AHL	5	0	0	0	2	—	—	—	—	—
2021–22	South Carolina Stingrays	ECHL	24	16	7	23	19	—	—	—	—	—
2021–22	Idaho Steelheads	ECHL	13	11	8	19	15	—	—	—	—	—
2021–22	Hershey Bears	AHL	23	7	3	10	7	—	—	—	—	—
2022–23	Idaho Steelheads	ECHL	72	30	37	67	61	19	11	7	18	14
2023–24	HK Poprad	Slovak	44	**30**	27	57	44	6	4	1	5	35
AHL totals			69	12	8	20	26	—	—	—	—	—
