= Jerguš Bača =

- Born: 4 January 1965 (age 61) Liptovský Mikuláš, Czechoslovakia
- Height: 6 ft 2 in (188 cm)
- Weight: 215 lb (98 kg; 15 st 5 lb)
- Position: Defence
- Shot: Left
- Played for: Hartford Whalers
- National team: Czechoslovakia and Slovakia
- NHL draft: 141st overall, 1990; Hartford Whalers
- Playing career: 1987–2005

Jerguš Bača (born 4 January 1965) is a Slovak former professional ice hockey defenceman.

== Career ==
Bača was drafted in the seventh round, 141st overall, by the Hartford Whalers in the 1990 NHL entry draft. He played ten games in the National Hockey League with the Whalers: nine in the 1990–91 season and one more in the 1991–92 season. He also competed in the men's tournament at the 1994 Winter Olympics.

In May 2023, Bača became the manager of HK MŠK Indian Žiar nad Hronom ahead of the 2023–24 season of Tipos SHL.

== Career statistics ==
=== Regular season and playoffs ===
			Regular season					Playoffs
Season	Team	League	GP	G	A	Pts	PIM	GP	G	A	Pts	PIM
1979–80	Partizán Liptovský Mikuláš	SVK-2	—	—	—	—	—	—	—	—	—	—
1980–81	Partizán Liptovský Mikuláš	SVK-2	—	—	—	—	—	—	—	—	—	—
1981–82	Partizán Liptovský Mikuláš	SVK-2	—	—	—	—	—	—	—	—	—	—
1982–83	Partizán Liptovský Mikuláš	SVK-2	—	—	—	—	—	—	—	—	—	—
1983–84	Partizán Liptovský Mikuláš	SVK-2	—	—	—	—	—	—	—	—	—	—
1987–88	TJ VSŽ Košice	CSSR	40	5	5	10	32	—	—	—	—	—
1988–89	TJ VSŽ Košice	CSSR	33	2	7	9	46	9	1	3	4	—
1989–90	TJ VSŽ Košice	CSSR	47	9	16	25	—	—	—	—	—	—
1990–91	Hartford Whalers	NHL	9	0	2	2	14	—	—	—	—	—
1990–91	Springfield Indians	AHL	57	6	23	29	89	18	3	13	16	18
1991–92	Hartford Whalers	NHL	1	0	0	0	0	—	—	—	—	—
1991–92	Springfield Indians	AHL	64	6	20	26	88	11	0	6	6	20
1992–93	Milwaukee Admirals	IHL	73	9	29	38	108	6	0	3	3	2
1993–94	Milwaukee Admirals	IHL	67	6	29	35	119	3	1	1	2	4
1994–95	Leksands IF	SEL	38	2	5	7	50	4	2	2	4	12
1995–96	Milwaukee Admirals	IHL	74	3	12	15	130	5	1	3	4	8
1996–97	HC Košice	SVK	7	2	2	4	4	—	—	—	—	—
1996–97	HC Olomouc	CZE	50	3	8	11	103	—	—	—	—	—
1997–98	HC Košice	SVK	44	10	15	25	16	—	—	—	—	—
1998–99	HC VSŽ Košice	SVK	53	5	19	24	76	—	—	—	—	—
1999–00	Revierlöwen Oberhausen	DEL	49	10	7	17	85	—	—	—	—	—
2000–01	Revierlöwen Oberhausen	DEL	60	5	14	19	94	2	0	0	0	27
2001–02	Revierlöwen Oberhausen	DEL	58	8	14	22	120	—	—	—	—	—
2002–03	HK 32 Liptovský Mikuláš	SVK	46	3	8	11	44	—	—	—	—	—
2002–03	HC Dukla Trenčín	SVK	6	2	0	2	10	12	0	4	4	14
2003–04	HK 32 Liptovský Mikuláš	SVK	53	3	6	9	61	4	0	0	0	8
2004–05	HK 32 Liptovský Mikuláš	SVK	50	2	9	11	109	5	1	0	1	12
CSSR totals			120	16	28	44	—	9	1	3	4	—
SVK totals			259	27	59	86	320	21	1	4	5	34
NHL totals			10	0	2	2	14	—	—	—	—	—

=== International ===
Year	Team	Event	GP	G	A	Pts	PIM
1989	Czechoslovakia	WC	10	1	1	2	14
1990	Czechoslovakia	WC	8	0	0	0	16
1991	Czechoslovakia	CC	5	0	3	3	4
1994	Slovakia	OG	8	1	2	3	10
1996	Slovakia	WCH	3	1	0	1	6
1997	Slovakia	WC	8	0	2	2	4
1998	Slovakia	WC	6	0	0	0	4
2002	Slovakia	WC	9	0	1	1	10
Senior totals			57	3	9	12	68
