= Alexander Avtsin =

Russian ice hockey player (born 1991)

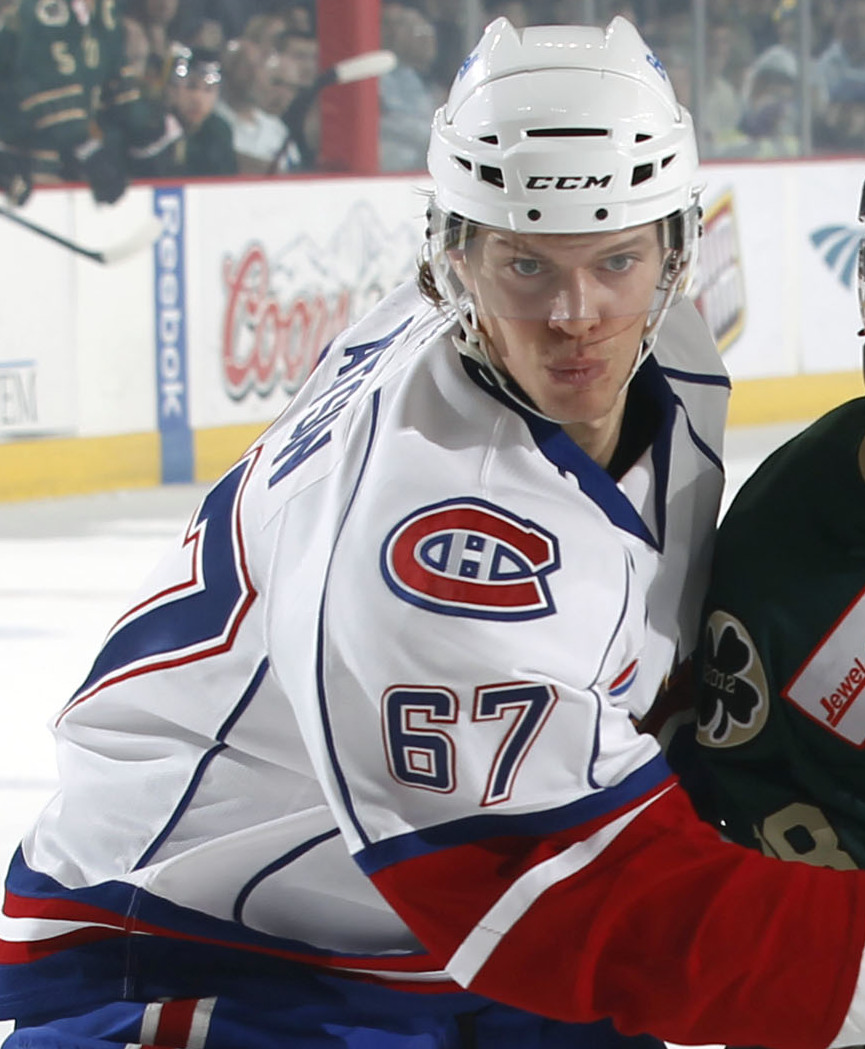
- Avtsin with the Hamilton Bulldogs in 2012
- Born: 19 March 1991 (age 35) Moscow, Russian SFSR, Soviet Union
- Height: 6 ft 2.8 in (190 cm)
- Weight: 212 lb (96 kg; 15 st 2 lb)
- Position: Right wing
- Shoots: Right
- Slovak Extraliga team Former teams: Liptovský Mikuláš HK; Dynamo Moscow; Lokomotiv Yaroslavl; Admiral Vladivostok; Severstal Cherepovets; Neftekhimik Nizhnekamsk; Traktor Chelyabinsk; Spartak Moscow; HC Vityaz; HC 21 Prešov
- NHL draft: 109th overall, 2009; Montreal Canadiens
- Playing career: 2009–present

Alexander Alexandrovich Avtsin (Russian: Александр Александрович Авцин; born 19 March 1991) is a Russian professional ice hockey right wing for Liptovský Mikuláš HK in the Slovak Extraliga. He was selected in the fourth round, 109th overall, by the Montreal Canadiens in the 2009 NHL entry draft.

== Playing career ==
Avtsin was drafted by the Montreal Canadiens in the fourth round of the 2009 entry draft, 109th overall while within the HC Dynamo Moscow organization in the Kontinental Hockey League. He was also drafted 43rd overall in the Canadian Hockey League draft by the Quebec Remparts, but opted to remain in Russia.

On 2 July 2010 Avtsin came to a mutual agreement with HC Dynamo Moscow to leave the team. He plans on going to Montreal for training camp and if he does not make the team is willing to play for the Canadiens' farm team, the Hamilton Bulldogs.

On 15 July 2010 Avtsin agreed to terms on a three-years entry-level contract with the Montreal Canadiens. In the 2012–13 season, his third year with Canadiens affiliate the Bulldogs, after just 15 games Avtsin agreed to mutually terminate the remainder of his contract and on 3 May 2013, after clearing waivers, was released as a free agent.

On 11 July 2013 Avtsin agreed to a contract to return to the KHL with Lokomotiv Yaroslavl.

After two seasons with Traktor Chelyabinsk, Avtsin left as a free agent and signed a one-year contract for the 2021–22 season to continue in the KHL with Spartak Moscow on 19 June 2021. In a checking line role, Avtsin made 36 regular season appearances with Spartak, posting 1 goal and 4 points.

As a free agent from Spartak, Avtsin secured a one-year contract to join HC Vityaz on 5 May 2022.

== Personal ==
He is married and has a daughter.

== Career statistics ==
			Regular season					Playoffs
Season	Team	League	GP	G	A	Pts	PIM	GP	G	A	Pts	PIM
2008–09	Dynamo Moscow-2	RUS-3	76	56	54	110	130	—	—	—	—	—
2009–10	MHC Dynamo	MHL	12	4	5	9	20	—	—	—	—	—
2009–10	Dynamo Moscow	KHL	30	3	6	9	10	—	—	—	—	—
2010–11	Hamilton Bulldogs	AHL	58	5	15	20	22	4	0	2	2	2
2011–12	Hamilton Bulldogs	AHL	63	6	8	14	34	—	—	—	—	—
2012–13	Hamilton Bulldogs	AHL	15	2	3	5	4	—	—	—	—	—
2013–14	Lokomotiv Yaroslavl	KHL	6	0	0	0	6	—	—	—	—	—
2013–14	Admiral Vladivostok	KHL	1	0	0	0	0	—	—	—	—	—
2013–14	HK Lipetsk	VHL	9	3	1	4	6	—	—	—	—	—
2014–15	Dizel Penza	VHL	49	11	7	18	38	13	6	1	7	8
2015–16	Dynamo Moscow	KHL	18	1	1	2	4	1	0	0	0	0
2015–16	Dynamo Balashikha	VHL	8	2	2	4	2	10	3	4	7	8
2016–17	Dynamo Balashikha	VHL	10	3	5	8	10	—	—	—	—	—
2016–17	Severstal Cherepovets	KHL	38	2	1	3	10	—	—	—	—	—
2017–18	Neftekhimik Nizhnekamsk	KHL	44	12	3	15	8	5	0	1	1	0
2018–19	Neftekhimik Nizhnekamsk	KHL	20	1	2	3	8	—	—	—	—	—
2019–20	Neftekhimik Nizhnekamsk	KHL	10	1	2	3	8	—	—	—	—	—
2019–20	CSK VVS Samara	VHL	3	0	0	0	17	—	—	—	—	—
2019–20	Traktor Chelyabinsk	KHL	31	5	9	14	59	—	—	—	—	—
2019–20	Chelmet Chelyabinsk	VHL	2	3	0	3	0	—	—	—	—	—
2020–21	Traktor Chelyabinsk	KHL	59	5	9	14	24	4	1	0	1	0
2021–22	Spartak Moscow	KHL	36	1	3	4	6	—	—	—	—	—
2022–23	HC Vityaz	KHL	13	0	2	2	6	—	—	—	—	—
KHL totals			306	31	38	69	149	10	1	1	2	0
AHL totals			136	13	26	39	60	4	0	2	2	2
