= Stanislav Škorvánek =

Slovak ice hockey player (born 1996)

- Born: 31 January 1996 (age 30) Žilina, Slovakia
- Height: 6 ft 2 in (188 cm)
- Weight: 194 lb (88 kg; 13 st 12 lb)
- Position: Goaltender
- Catches: Left
- Czech extraliga team Former teams: Mountfield HK; HC 46 Bardejov; HC Nové Zámky; HK Trnava; HC 07 Detva; HC Košice; HC Prešov; MHK Humenné; Vlci Žilina; HK Dukla Michalovce
- National team: Slovakia
- NHL draft: Undrafted
- Playing career: 2015–present

Stanislav Škorvánek (born 31 January 1996) is a Slovak professional ice hockey player who is a goaltender for Mountfield HK of the Czech Extraliga.

== Career statistics ==
=== Regular season and playoffs ===
			Regular season										Playoffs
Season	Team	League	GP	W	L	T	OTL	MIN	GA	SO	GAA	SV%	GP	W	L	MIN	GA	SO	GAA	SV%

=== International ===
Year	Team	Event	Result	GP	W	L	OT	MIN	GA	SO	GAA	SV%
2023	Slovakia	WC	9th	4	3	1	0	238	5	1	1.26	.954
2024	Slovakia	WC	7th	3	2	1	0	179	13	0	4.36	.838
2024	Slovakia	OGQ	Q	—	—	—	—	—	—	—	—	—
2026	Slovakia	OG	4th	2	1	1	0	87	4	0	2.74	.895
Senior totals				9	6	3	0	504	22	1	2.62	.903
