= Marek Drtina =

Czech professional ice hockey defenceman

- Born: June 5, 1989 (age 36) Pardubice, Czechoslovakia
- Height: 6 ft 5 in (196 cm)
- Weight: 198 lb (90 kg; 14 st 2 lb)
- Position: Defence
- Shoots: Left
- team Former teams: Free agent HC Pardubice; HK 36 Skalica; Nice hockey Côte d'Azur; HC Nové Zámky
- Playing career: 2009–present

Marek Drtina (born June 5, 1989) is a Czech professional ice hockey defenceman. He is currently a free agent.

He played with HC Pardubice in the Czech Extraliga during the 2010–11 Czech Extraliga season. He eventually left the Czech league and joined the France professional league, Ligue Magnus, in 2018.
