= Matúš Holenda =

Slovak ice hockey player

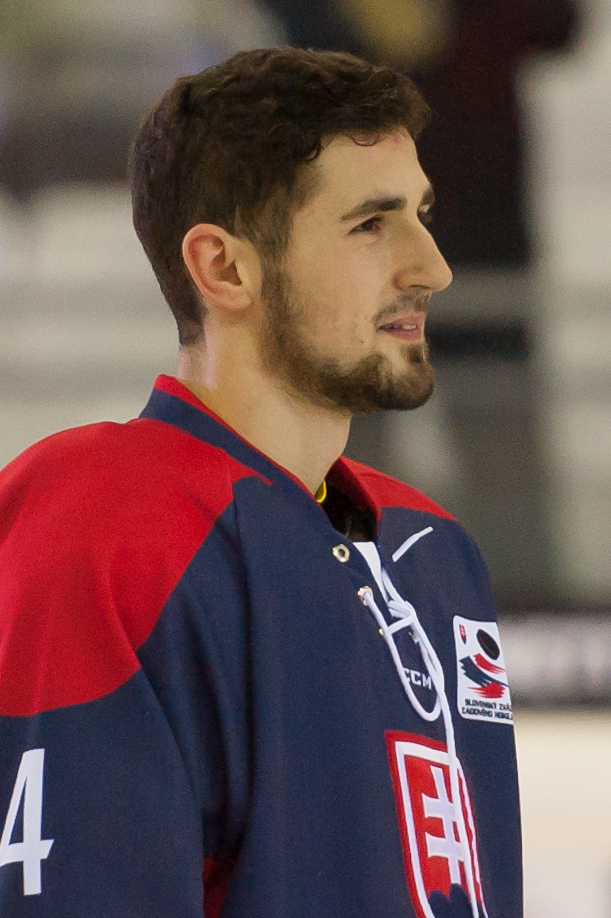
- Matúš Holenda
- Born: 20 April 1995 (age 29); Trenčín, Slovakia
- Height: 5 ft 10 in (178 cm)
- Weight: 165 lb (75 kg; 11 st 11 lb)
- Position: Defence
- Shoots: Left
- Slovak team Former teams: HC '05 Banská Bystrica; HK Dukla Trenčín; HK Trnava; HK Orange 20; HK Dukla Senica; HK 95 Považská Bystrica; HC Nové Zámky
- Playing career: 2012–present

Matúš Holenda (born 20 April 1995) is a Slovak professional ice hockey defenceman for HC '05 Banská Bystrica of the Slovak Extraliga.

Holenda began his career with his hometown team HK Dukla Trenčín and played 241 games for the team from 2012 to 2019. He also had loan spells with HK Trnava, HK Dukla Senica and HK 95 Panthers Považská Bystrica. On 8 August 2020 Holenda signed for HC Nové Zámky.

== Career statistics ==
=== Regular season and playoffs ===
			Regular season					Playoffs
Season	Team	League	GP	G	A	Pts	PIM	GP	G	A	Pts	PIM

Medal record

Representing Slovakia

Ice hockey

IIHF World U20 Championship
Bronze medal – third place	2015 Canada	

=== International ===
Year	Team	Event	Result	GP	G	A	Pts	PIM
2013	Slovakia	WJC18	9th	6	0	1	1	2
2015	Slovakia	WJC	3rd place, bronze medalist(s)	7	1	0	1	4
Junior totals				13	1	1	2	6
