= HK Brezno =

- City: Brezno, Slovakia
- League: Slovak 1. Liga
- Founded: 1935
- Home arena: Aréna Brezno (capacity: 3,000)
- Colours: Red, white, black
- Head coach: (Slovakia) Milan Staš
- Website: www.hkbrezno.com

HK Brezno is a professional Slovak ice hockey team playing in the Slovak 1. Liga. They play their games at Aréna Brezno in the Slovak town of Brezno. The club was founded in 1935.

== Honours ==
=== Domestic ===
Slovak 2. Liga

- (bronze) 3rd place (1): 2016–17

== Club names ==
- HO ŠK Brezno –1935
- ŠK Brezno nad Hronom –1939
- Jednota SD Brezno –1976
- TJ Mostáreň Brezno
- 1.MSK VTJ Brezno –1998
- HK Brezno – (2003–present)
