= Bruno Mráz =

Slovak ice hockey player

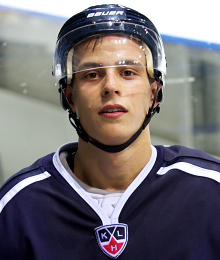
- Born: 13 April 1993 (age 33) Bratislava, Slovakia
- Height: 5 ft 11 in (180 cm)
- Weight: 198 lb (90 kg; 14 st 2 lb)
- Position: Centre
- Shoots: Right
- team Former teams: Free agent HK Orange 20; MHC Martin; HC Slovan Bratislava; HK 36 Skalica; HKM Zvolen; HC Olomouc; AZ Havířov; HC Košice; HK Dukla Michalovce
- Playing career: 2011–present

Bruno Mráz (born 13 April 1993) is a Slovak ice hockey player. He is currently a free agent.

He previously played five games in the Kontinental Hockey League for HC Slovan Bratislava.

== International ==
He participated in the 2010 and 2011 World Junior Ice Hockey Championship under 18 years and in the 2012 World Junior Ice Hockey Championships under 20 years as a member of the Slovakia men's national junior ice hockey team.

== Career statistics ==
=== Regular season and playoffs ===
			Regular season					Playoffs
Season	Team	League	GP	G	A	Pts	PIM	GP	G	A	Pts	PIM
2009–10	HC Slovan Bratislava	Slovak-Jr.	43	8	14	22	24	—	—	—	—	—
2010–11	HC Slovan Bratislava	Slovak-Jr.	32	15	22	37	38	4	3	0	3	0
2010–11	HK Orange 20	Slovak	9	0	1	1	18	—	—	—	—	—
2011–12	Brandon Wheat Kings	WHL	63	2	16	18	16	9	1	2	3	4
2012–13	MHC Martin	Slovak	6	0	0	0	0	—	—	—	—	—
2012–13	HK Orange 20	Slovak	18	2	3	5	14	—	—	—	—	—
2013–14	HC Slovan Bratislava	KHL	5	0	0	0	0	—	—	—	—	—
2013–14	HK 36 Skalica	Slovak	46	13	8	21	26	5	1	1	2	2
2014–15	HK 36 Skalica	Slovak	35	4	9	13	18	—	—	—	—	—
2015–16	HKM Zvolen	Slovak	55	12	22	34	22	12	1	4	5	6
2016–17	HKM Zvolen	Slovak	44	17	19	36	51	7	3	3	6	2
2017–18	HC Olomouc	Czech	44	5	2	7	12	4	0	0	0	2
2018–19	HC Olomouc	Czech	42	5	6	11	26	1	0	0	0	0
2018–19	AZ Havířov	Czech.1	1	0	0	0	0	—	—	—	—	—
2019–20	HKM Zvolen	Slovak	50	16	13	29	26	—	—	—	—	—
2020–21	HC Slovan Bratislava	Slovak	4	0	0	0	2	—	—	—	—	—
2020–21	HC Košice	Slovak	38	13	17	30	24	2	0	2	2	0
2021–22	HK Dukla Michalovce	Slovak	26	4	3	7	20	6	0	0	0	2
Slovak totals			331	81	95	176	221	32	5	10	15	12
Czech totals			86	10	8	18	38	5	0	0	0	2

=== International ===
Year	Team	Event	Result	GP	G	A	Pts	PIM
2010	Slovakia	WJC18	8th	6	1	1	2	2
2011	Slovakia	WJC18	10th	6	3	1	4	8
2013	Slovakia	WJC	8th	6	2	3	5	0
Junior totals				18	6	5	11	10
