= Kirill Dyakov =

Russian ice hockey player

- Born: 21 May 1993 (age 32) Nizhny Tagil, Russia
- Height: 6 ft 2 in (188 cm)
- Weight: 209 lb (95 kg; 14 st 13 lb)
- Position: Defence
- Shoots: Left
- Slovak team Former teams: HC 19 Humenné; HC Ugra; Torpedo Nizhny Novgorod; Lada Togliatti; HC Neftekhimik Nizhnekamsk; Metallurg Novokuznetsk; Admiral Vladivostok; Yunost Minsk; HC Sochi; HKM Zvolen; MHk 32 Liptovský Mikuláš
- Playing career: 2010–present

Kirill Dyakov (born 21 May 1993) is a Russian professional ice hockey defenceman who is currently playing for HC 19 Humenné of the Slovak Extraliga.

== Playing career ==
Dyakov was drafted by HC Ugra in the 2nd round, 47th overall, in the 2010 KHL Junior Draft, and made his Kontinental Hockey League debut playing with HC Ugra during the 2011–12 KHL season.

Dyakov returned to his original club HC Ugra on June 22, 2015, after a whirlwind 2014–15 season in the KHL with Torpedo Nizhny Novgorod, HC Neftekhimik Nizhnekamsk and HC Lada Togliatti.

== Career statistics ==
Medal record

Ice hockey

Representing Russia

World Junior Championships
Bronze medal – third place	2013 Russia	

=== International ===
Year	Team	Event	Result	GP	G	A	Pts	PIM
2013	Russia	U20	3rd place, bronze medalist(s)	7	1	2	3	4
Junior totals				7	1	2	3	4
