= Niké Aréna (Žilina) =

Sports and concert venue, Slovakia

Coordinates: 49.2288856°N 18.7431264°E

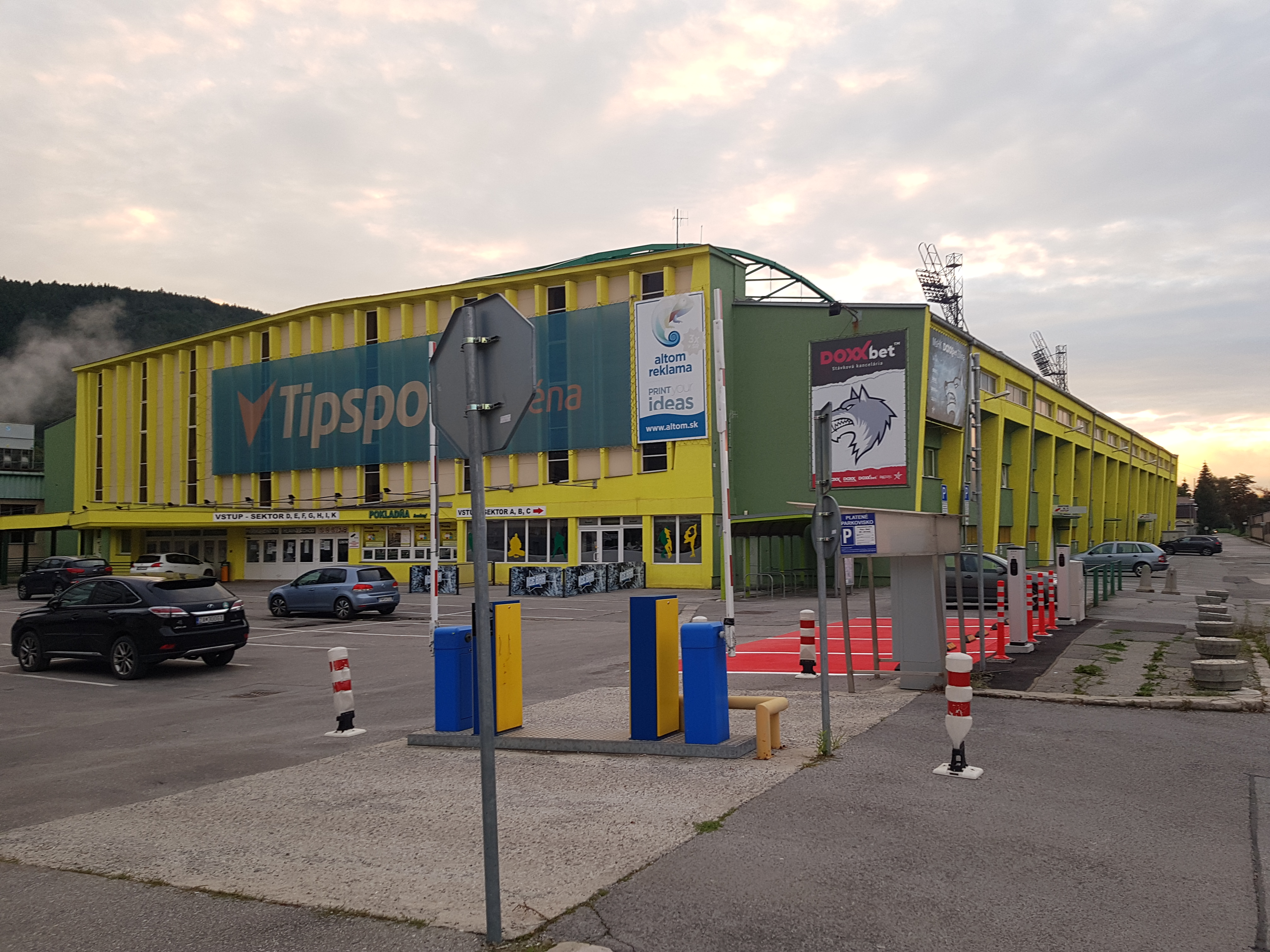
Garmin Arena

Niké Aréna is an arena in Žilina, Slovakia. It is primarily used for ice hockey and is the home arena of Vlci Žilina. It has a capacity of 6,200 people and was built in 1945.
