= Patrik Koyš =

Slovak ice hockey player

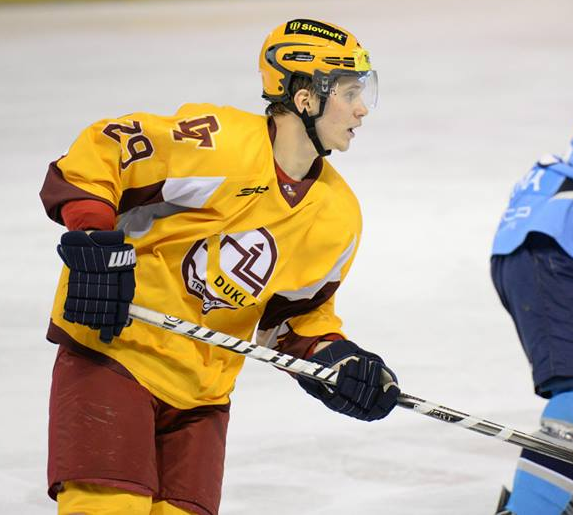
- Born: 24 October 1995 (age 30) Ilava, Slovakia
- Height: 5 ft 9 in (175 cm)
- Weight: 170 lb (77 kg; 12 st 2 lb)
- Position: Left wing
- Shoots: Left
- Tipsport Liga team Former teams: HC Topoľčany; Dukla Trenčín; HK Poprad; MHC Martin; HC Košice; MHk 32 Liptovský Mikuláš
- National team: Slovakia
- NHL draft: Undrafted
- Playing career: 2012–present

Patrik Koyš (born October 24, 1995) is a Slovak ice hockey player who is currently playing for the HC Topoľčany in the Slovak 1. Liga.

== International play ==
Medal record

Representing Slovakia

Ice hockey

IIHF World U20 Championship
Bronze medal – third place	2015 Canada	

After playing for Slovakia at the U18 and U20 levels. In 2015, he guided Slovakia's U20 team to a bronze medal at the 2015 World Junior Championships.
