= HC 21 Prešov =

HC Prešov
- Nickname: Koňare (Horse keepers)
- City: Prešov, Slovakia
- League: Slovak Extraliga
- Founded: 2021
- Home arena: Ice Arena Prešov (capacity: 3,600)
- Colours: Red, black, white, gold
- Owner: City Prešov
- Head coach: Tommi Hämäläinen
- Captain: Alexander Avtsin
- Website: presovhockey.com

HC Prešov is an ice hockey team playing in the Slovak Extraliga, and formed in 2021, after HC Prešov Penguins announced the dissolution of their club. They play in the city of Prešov, Slovakia. The team is nicknamed Koňare, which means "horse keepers" in English.

== History ==
The newly established hockey club HC 21 Prešov replaced HC 07 Detva in Slovak Extraliga from the season 2021–22. Ernest Bokroš was the head coach and the basic team should be made up of players from Detva. The final point for moving the Detvian club to Prešov gave the Slovak Ice Hockey Federation, but it was only a formality.

The owner of the Detvian club, Róbert Ľupták, decided to move the Extraliga license to Prešov. Not only he moves from Detva to Prešov, but also several other players, including forward Ján Sýkora. The first captain of the team was Marek Zagrapan from Prešov, who came from HK Poprad. Zagrapan was drafted by the Buffalo Sabres in the first round, 13th overall, in the 2005 NHL entry draft.

== Honours ==
=== Domestic ===
Slovak 1. Liga

- (gold) Winners (1): 2024–25
