= HK Levice =

- City: Levice, Slovakia
- League: Slovak 1. Liga
- Founded: 1987; 39 years ago
- Home arena: Levice Ice Stadium (capacity: 2,286)
- Colours: Green, yellow
- Head coach: (Slovakia) Martin Baran
- Website: www.hklevice.sk

HK Levice is a professional Slovak ice hockey club based in Levice, Slovakia. They currently play in the Slovak 1. Liga. The team was established in 1987.

== History ==
The first year of the 1987/1988 season, VTJ Levice played in a regional competition that team won league. Since the 1988/1989 competition, the cooperative has played in II. SNHL, which regularly fought until 1993 for a procedure until I. SNHL.

== Honours ==
=== Domestic ===
Slovak 2. Liga

- (gold) Winners (1): 2018–19
