= HK MŠK Indian Žiar nad Hronom =

- Nickname: Indiáni (Indians)
- City: Žiar nad Hronom, Slovakia
- League: Slovak 1. Liga
- Founded: 1952
- Home arena: Slovalco aréna (capacity: 2,025)
- Colours: Claret, beige
- Head coach: Jerguš Bača
- Captain: Martin Jakúbek
- Website: www.hkmskziar.sk

HK MŠK Indian Žiar nad Hronom is an ice hockey team in Žiar nad Hronom, Slovakia. They play in the Slovak 1. Liga, the second level of ice hockey in Slovakia.

== History ==
The beginnings of ice hockey in Žiar nad Hronom date back to 1952–53, when the enthusiasm of some young people for this sport gave rise to the establishment of a hockey team. The formed men's team competed within the district and the region. The whole organizational work was based on several volunteer officials and the players themselves, who prepared the ice and lighting themselves. Initially, it was played on the old playground by the stream, later in the premises of the I. ZDŠ, then in the park on the site of the current tennis courts and finally on the site of the current winter stadium.

== Notable players ==
- Marek Uram
- Jozef Stümpel
