= Vlci Žilina =

- Nickname: Vlci (Wolves)
- City: Žilina, Slovakia
- League: Slovak Extraliga
- Founded: 1925
- Home arena: Niké Aréna (capacity 6,200)
- Colours: Yellow, green, forest, grey
- General manager: František Skladaný
- Head coach: Milan Bartovič
- Captain: Rastislav Dej
- Website: www.vlcizilina.sk

Vlci Žilina is a professional Slovak ice hockey club based in Žilina. They currently play in the Slovak Extraliga. The club has won the Slovak league championship in 2006. The team is nicknamed Vlci, it means Wolves in English.

== History ==
The club was founded on 25 January 1925 as ŠK Žilina. They played first official game against Slávia Banská Bystrica on 16 December 1928. Žilina was beaten 0–3. They competed in the Championship of Central Slovakia before and during World War II. In the 1931–32 season they won this championship. After WW II and restored Czechoslovakia they played in the Czechoslovak Extraliga two seasons. Žilina finished last in the 1951–52 season and the 1952–53 season. They won the 1964–65 1. SNHL season and promoted to the qualification for the Czechoslovak Extraliga. In the qualification round they lost all games and did not promote. After dissolution of Czechoslovakia they were included to the Slovak 1.Liga, second level of Slovak hockey. Žilina won the 2000–01 Slovak 1.Liga season and promoted to the Slovak Extraliga first time. In the 2005–06 season they reached the most remarkable success. Žilina won the Slovak Extraliga first time after beating HK Poprad 4–3 in the final series. Michal Hreus was the top scorer of Žilina in the playoffs, recording 15 points (7G+8A). Through the victory in Extraliga they gained an option to play with the best European ice hockey teams in the IIHF European Champions Cup. Žilina was defeated 0–7 by HPK in first game but then won 4–2 against HC Sparta Praha and finished second in the Ragulin division.

In the 2018–19 season, Žilina were relegated to the Slovak 1. Liga after losing a best-of-seven relegation playoff to HK Dukla Michalovce. They played in the second tier of Slovak hockey until regaining promotion after winning the 2023–24 season.

Club's 100-percent shareholders, the City of Žilina, had sold the shares to a private company Lupiza in May 2020. The new owners had intended to rename the club to HK Vlci Žilina.

== Current roster ==
As of 8 December 2024.

No.	Nat	Player	Pos	S/G	Age	Acquired	Birthplace
32	(Russia)	Alexander Avtsin	LW	R	35	2024	Moscow, Russian SFSR, Soviet Union
34	(Slovakia)	Jozef Baláž	C	L	26	2024	Liptovský Mikuláš, Slovakia
83	(Slovakia)	Martin Belluš	RW	R	34	2023	Spišská Nová Ves, Czechoslovakia
12	(Slovakia)	Šimon Beták	RW	L	31	2023	Trnava, Slovakia
27	(Slovakia)	Rastislav Dej (C)	LW	L	37	2024	Považská Bystrica, Czechoslovakia
23	(Slovakia)	Jakub Dubravik	LW	L	18	2023	Hereford, England, United Kingdom
44	(Russia)	Kirill Dyakov	D	L	32	2024	Nizhny Tagil, Russia
22	(United States)	Hunter Fejes	LW	L	31	2024	Anchorage, Alaska, United States
48	(Slovakia)	Daniel Gachulinec	D	R	32	2024	Považská Bystrica, Slovakia
20	(Slovakia)	Peter Galamboš (A)	C	L	36	2023	Martin, Czechoslovakia
95	(Slovakia)	Matúš Holenda	D	L	31	2024	Trenčín, Slovakia
18	(Canada)	Nick Jones (A)	C	R	29	2024	Edmonton, Alberta, Canada
17	(Slovakia)	Michal Juščák	C	R	27	2023	Bratislava, Slovakia
92	(Slovakia)	Jakub Kolenič	RW	R	24	2024	Zvolen, Slovakia
29	(Slovakia)	Andrej Košarišťan	G	L	32	2023	Dolný Kubín, Slovakia
8	(Slovakia)	Patrik Koyš (A)	RW	L	30	2020	Ilava, Slovakia
1	(Canada)	Connor LaCouvee	G	L	31	2024	Qualicum Beach, British Columbia, Canada
77	(Canada)	Jarid Lukosevicius	RW	R	31	2024	Squamish, British Columbia, Canada
16	(Canada)	Brenden Miller	D	L	32	2024	Orangeville, Ontario, Canada
10	(Slovakia)	Miroslav Mucha	RW	L	28	2024	Bytča, Slovakia
7	(Slovakia)	Jakub Pobezal	D	L	23	20	Považská Bystrica, Slovakia
81	(Slovakia)	Erik Rajnoha	D	L	27	2023	Trenčín, Slovakia
28	(Slovakia)	Sebastián Šmida	C	R	27	2023	Skalica, Slovakia
89	(Canada)	Miguël Tourigny	D	R	24	2024	Victoriaville, Quebec, Canada
15	(Slovakia)	Tomas Vajko	D	L	18	2024	Lučenec, Slovakia
73	(Slovakia)	Róbert Varga (A)	LW	L	31	2022	Bratislava, Slovakia
9	(Poland)	Kamil Wałęga	C	R	25	2024	Cieszyn, Poland

== Honours ==
=== Domestic ===
Slovak Extraliga

- (gold) Winners (1): 2005–06
- (bronze) 3rd place (2): 2016–17, 2024–25

Slovak 1. Liga

- (gold) Winners (3): 2000–01, 2021–22, 2023–24
- (silver) Runners-up (3): 1998–99, 2020–21, 2022–23

Slovak Hockey League

- (bronze) 3rd place (1): 1940–41

1st. Slovak National Hockey League

- (gold) Winners (1): 1964–65
- (bronze) 3rd place (2): 1965–66, 1967–68

=== Pre-season ===
Rona Cup

- (gold) Winners (1): 2006

Preceded by HC Slovan Bratislava	Slovak Extraliga; Champions; 2005–06	Succeeded by HC Slovan Bratislava
