= Slovenská hokejová liga =

League of Slovak men's ice hockey

TIPOS Slovenská hokejová liga
- Current season, competition or edition: 2026–27 Slovak 1. Liga season
- Sport: Ice hockey
- Founded: 1993
- No. of teams: 12 + JOJ ŠPORT Slovensko 18
- Country: Slovakia
- Most recent champions: HC Prešov (1st title)
- Most titles: HK Spišská Nová Ves & HC '05 Banská Bystrica (both 4 titles)
- Promotion to: Slovak Extraliga
- Relegation to: Slovak 2. Liga
- Website: shl.hockeyslovakia.sk

The TIPOS Slovenská hokejová liga (TIPOS Slovak Hockey League) is a professional ice hockey league comprising twelve teams in Slovakia. It is the second highest ice hockey league in Slovakia.

== Game ==
Every regular season game has three 20-minute periods, with a maximum intermission of 18 minutes between periods. If the game is tied after the 60-minute regulation, a five-minute three-on-three sudden death overtime period is played. If the game remains tied after the overtime period, a shootout decides the game. In a shootout, the team that scores the most penalty shots out of five attempts wins. If the game is still tied after the first five penalty-shot rounds, the shootout continues round by round, until one team scores while the other fails to score.

== Teams ==
Thirteen teams play in the 2026–27 Slovak 1. Liga season:

Teams of the 2025–26 Slovak 1. Liga season

Team name	City	Venue	Capacity
HC Nové Zámky	Nové Zámky	Zimný štadión Nové Zámky	4,500
HK Levice	Levice	Zimný štadión Levice	4,233
HC Topoľčany	Topoľčany	Topvar Aréna	3,400
HK Skalica	Skalica	Skalica Ice Stadium	4,100
HC 19 Humenné	Humenné	Humenné Ice Stadium	3,150
HK 95 Panthers Považská Bystrica	Považská Bystrica	Zimný štadión MSK Považská Bystrica	2,400
TSS GROUP Dubnica	Dubnica nad Váhom	Zimný štadión Dubnica nad Váhom	3,000
HK Trnava	Trnava	Zimný štadión Trnava	3,800
HK MŠK Indian Žiar nad Hronom	Žiar nad Hronom	Slovalco aréna	2,025
JOJ ŠPORT Slovensko 18	Piešťany	Patrícia Ice Arena 37	5,000
HK Detva	Detva	Zimný štadión Detva	1,000
MHA Martin	Martin	Martin Ice Stadium	3,600
HC TEBS Bratislava	Bratislava	Zimný štadión Vladimíra Dzurillu (sk)	3,500

== Previous winners ==
=== Slovak Hockey League Champions ===
- 1993 – 1994: HK Spartak Dubnica nad Váhom
- 1994 – 1995: ŠK Iskra Banská Bystrica
- 1995 – 1996: HK VTJ Spišská Nová Ves
- 1996 – 1997: HKm Zvolen
- 1997 – 1998: ŠK Iskra Banská Bystrica
- 1998 – 1999: HK Spartak Dubnica nad Váhom
- 1999 – 2000: HC Martimex ZŤS Martin
- 2000 – 2001: MsHK ŠKP Žilina
- 2001 – 2002: HK VTJ Spišská Nová Ves
- 2002 – 2003: MHC Nitra
- 2003 – 2004: HK Dubnica nad Váhom
- 2004 – 2005: HKm Detva
- 2005 – 2006: HC '05 Banská Bystrica
- 2006 – 2007: MHK SkiPark Kežmarok
- 2007 – 2008: HC '05 Banská Bystrica
- 2008 – 2009: HK Spišská Nová Ves
- 2009 – 2010: ŠHK 37 Piešťany
- 2010 – 2011: ŠHK 37 Piešťany
- 2011 – 2012: HC 46 Bardejov
- 2012 – 2013: HC 46 Bardejov
- 2013 – 2014: HC 46 Bardejov
- 2014 – 2015: HC 07 Detva
- 2015 – 2016: HC Nové Zámky
- 2016 – 2017: HC 07 Orin Detva
- 2017 – 2018: HK Dukla Ingema Michalovce
- 2018 – 2019: HK Dukla Ingema Michalovce
- 2019 – 2020: Not held due to COVID-19 pandemic in Slovakia
- 2020 – 2021: HK Spišská Nová Ves
- 2021 – 2022: Vlci Žilina
- 2022 – 2023: HC 19 Humenné
- 2023 – 2024: Vlci Žilina
- 2024 – 2025: HC Prešov
- 2025 – 2026: HC 19 Humenné

== See also ==
- Slovak Extraliga
- 2. liga
