= 2011–12 Lev Poprad season =

Professional ice hockey team season of play

2011–12 HC Lev Poprad
- Division: 6th Bobrov
- Conference: 10th Western
- 2011–12 record: 13–0–8–4 (54 pts)
- Goals for: 125
- Goals against: 162

Team information
- Coach: (Czech Republic) Radim Rulík
- Assistant coach: (Slovakia) Róbert Pukalovič (Russia) Vladimir Kapulovsky
- Captain: (Slovakia) Ľuboš Bartečko
- Arena: Poprad Ice Stadium

Team leaders
- Goals: (Czech Republic) Tomáš Netík (17)
- Assists: (Slovakia) Juraj Mikúš (16) (Czech Republic) Karel Pilař (16)
- Points: (Slovakia) Ľuboš Bartečko (30)
- Penalty minutes: (Slovakia) Branislav Mezei (117)
- Plus/minus: (+) (Slovakia) Juraj Mikúš (+10) (−) (Slovakia) Rudolf Huna (−13)
- Wins: (Slovakia) Ján Laco (8)
- Goals against average: (Slovakia) Ján Laco (2.57)

The 2011–12 Lev Poprad season was the Kontinental Hockey League (KHL) franchise's first and last season of play.

== Season summary ==
Almost two months after being officially admitted to the KHL, Lev announced the signings of its first five players on 30 June 2011. In the final roster, the majority of the players were from Slovakia and the Czech Republic. Head coach was Radim Rulík and the team captain was Ľuboš Bartečko. Lev's regular season was planned to start on 10 September 2011 with a match at home against Avangard Omsk, but because of the 2011 Lokomotiv Yaroslavl plane crash, the start of the season was postponed and Lev had their first game on 12 September against Metallurg Magnitogorsk. However, for their first win they had to wait until the sixth game, a 2–0 away win against Dinamo Riga on 26 September. Lev also failed to qualify for the play-offs and ended the season as 21st overall, with 54 points from 54 games. The team's top scorer was Ľuboš Bartečko with 30 points (16 goals and 14 assists).

== Schedule and results ==
2011–12 Game Log
September: 0–0–0–0 (Home: 0–0–0–0; Road: 0–0–0–0) Pts. 0

Game	Date	Opponent	Score	Decision	Location	Attendance	Record	Points	Recap

October: 0–0–0–0 (Home: 0–0–0–0; Road: 0–0–0–0) Pts. 0

Game	Date	Opponent	Score	Decision	Location	Attendance	Record	Points	Recap

November: 0–0–0–0 (Home: 0–0–0–0; Road: 0–0–0–0) Pts. 0

Game	Date	Opponent	Score	Decision	Location	Attendance	Record	Points	Recap

December: 0–0–0–0 (Home: 0–0–0–0; Road: 0–0–0–0) Pts. 0

Game	Date	Opponent	Score	Decision	Location	Attendance	Record	Points	Recap

January: 0–0–0–0 (Home: 0–0–0–0; Road: 0–0–0–0) Pts. 0

Game	Date	Opponent	Score	Decision	Location	Attendance	Record	Points	Recap

February: 0–0–0–0 (Home: 0–0–0–0; Road: 0–0–0–0) Pts. 0

Game	Date	Opponent	Score	Decision	Location	Attendance	Record	Points	Recap

Win (3 points) Overtime/shootout win (2 points) Overtime/shootout loss (1 point) Loss (0 points)

== Players ==
Thirty-three players in all represented the Lev Poprad during their lone season of play and existence. Ľuboš Bartečko led the team with 16 assists and 30 points, Tomas Netik led them in goalscoring registering 17. The list of players and 2011–12 regular season statistics are presented below.

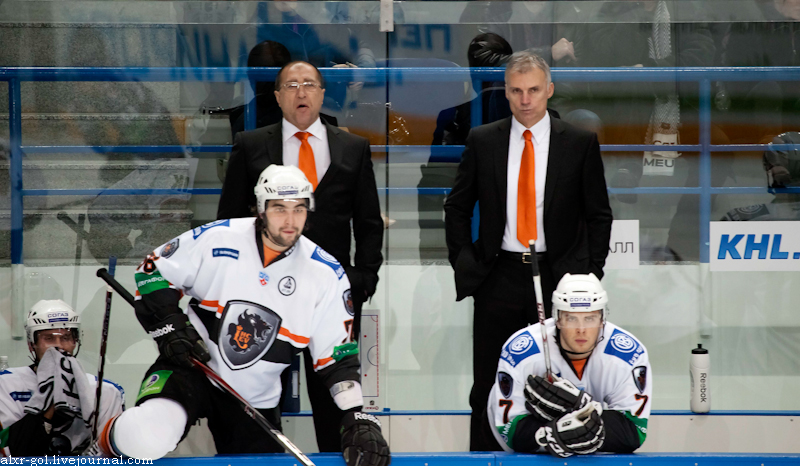
Lev bench during the match against Amur Khabarovsk on January 10, 2012.

Skaters
Player	Pos	GP	G	A	Pts	PIM	+/-
(Slovakia) Ľuboš Bartečko	LW	53	16	14	30	30	1
(Czech Republic) Tomáš Netík	LW	42	17	11	28	26	9
(Slovakia) Juraj Mikúš	C	44	12	16	28	46	10
(Czech Republic) Václav Nedorost	LW	37	14	8	22	22	3
(Slovakia) Ladislav Nagy	RW	30	7	12	19	59	−2
(Slovakia) Rastislav Špirko	LW	53	10	8	18	8	2
(Czech Republic) Karel Pilař	D	31	1	16	17	34	3
(Czech Republic) Jaroslav Kristek	RW	39	10	6	16	14	7
(Sweden) Emil Lundberg	C	54	10	6	16	26	−8
(Slovakia) Branislav Mezei	D	53	3	11	14	117	−5
(Czech Republic) Štěpán Novotný	RW	34	5	6	11	16	−2
(Czech Republic) Jiří Hunkes	D	48	1	10	11	32	−2
(Czech Republic) Jiří Sekáč	C	36	2	8	10	4	−1
(Sweden) Karl Fabricius	LW	48	1	7	8	20	−11
(Canada) Jonathan Sigalet	D	49	1	7	8	30	6
(Czech Republic) Martin Chabada	RW	35	4	3	7	24	−4
(Slovakia) Rudolf Huna	LW	49	2	5	7	14	−13
(United States) Grant Lewis	D	45	1	6	7	32	−8
(Slovakia) Martin Štrbák	D	35	1	4	5	32	4
(Slovakia) Vladimír Mihálik	D	37	1	4	5	37	−4
(Czech Republic) Aleš Ježek	F	13	2	0	2	18	−7
(Czech Republic) Stanislav Balán	F	16	1	1	2	4	−1
(Slovakia) Richard Mráz	LW	3	0	2	2	0	−1
(Czech Republic) Bohumil Jank	D	13	0	1	1	12	3
(Canada) Dan DaSilva	RW	15	0	1	1	10	−3
(Czech Republic) Jakub Matai	D	19	0	1	1	8	−7
(Slovakia) Karol Csanyi	F	2	0	0	0	0	0
(Slovakia) Peter Ölvecký	LW	6	0	0	0	0	−1
(Czech Republic) Jaroslav Šaršok	F	7	0	0	0	2	−1
(Sweden) Alexander Hellström	D	20	0	0	0	12	−8
(Czech Republic) Tomáš Klouček	D	20	0	0	0	18	−3

Goaltenders
Player	GP	W	L	SOP	SOG	GA	SV	SV%	GAA	G	A	SO	PIM	TOI
(Slovakia) Ján Laco	27	8	16	3	827	70	757	91.5	2.57	0	0	5	0	1631:42
(Czech Republic) Tomáš Duba	27	5	17	5	756	82	674	89.2	3.00	0	1	1	2	1640:26

== See also ==
- 2011-12 KHL season
