= 2007–08 NHL transactions =

The following is a list of all team-to-team transactions that have occurred in the National Hockey League during the 2007–08 NHL season. It lists what team each player has been traded to, signed by, or claimed by, and for which players or draft picks, if applicable.

The 2007–08 NHL trade deadline was on February 26, 2008. Players traded or claimed off waivers after that date were not be eligible to play in the 2008 Stanley Cup playoffs.

== Free agency ==
Note: This does not include players who have re-signed with their previous team as an unrestricted free agent or as a restricted free agent.

Date	Player	New team	Previous team
July 1, 2007	Jeff Hamilton	Carolina Hurricanes	Chicago Blackhawks
July 1, 2007	Michel Ouellet	Tampa Bay Lightning	Pittsburgh Penguins
July 1, 2007	Eric Perrin	Atlanta Thrashers	Tampa Bay Lightning
July 1, 2007	Jason Blake	Toronto Maple Leafs	New York Islanders
July 1, 2007	Viktor Kozlov	Washington Capitals	New York Islanders
July 1, 2007	Tom Poti	Washington Capitals	New York Islanders
July 1, 2007	Scott Hannan	Colorado Avalanche	San Jose Sharks
July 1, 2007	Jon Sim	New York Islanders	Atlanta Thrashers
July 1, 2007	Chris Drury	New York Rangers	Buffalo Sabres
July 1, 2007	Scott Gomez	New York Rangers	New Jersey Devils
July 1, 2007	Radek Dvorak	Florida Panthers	St. Louis Blues
July 1, 2007	Richard Zednik	Florida Panthers	New York Islanders
July 1, 2007	Brian Rafalski	Detroit Red Wings	New Jersey Devils
July 1, 2007	Shawn Thornton	Boston Bruins	Anaheim Ducks
July 1, 2007	Yanic Perreault	Chicago Blackhawks	Toronto Maple Leafs
July 1, 2007	Mathieu Schneider	Anaheim Ducks	Detroit Red Wings
July 1, 2007	Cory Sarich	Calgary Flames	Tampa Bay Lightning
July 1, 2007	Brett McLean	Florida Panthers	Colorado Avalanche
July 1, 2007	Todd White	Atlanta Thrashers	Minnesota Wild
July 1, 2007	Daniel Briere	Philadelphia Flyers	Buffalo Sabres
July 1, 2007	Jed Ortmeyer	Nashville Predators	New York Rangers
July 1, 2007	Ryan Smyth	Colorado Avalanche	New York Islanders
July 1, 2007	Paul Kariya	St. Louis Blues	Nashville Predators
July 2, 2007	Petr Sykora	Pittsburgh Penguins	Edmonton Oilers
July 2, 2007	Dany Sabourin	Pittsburgh Penguins	Vancouver Canucks
July 2, 2007	Darryl Sydor	Pittsburgh Penguins	Dallas Stars
July 2, 2007	Michael Nylander	Washington Capitals	New York Rangers
July 2, 2007	Roman Hamrlik	Montreal Canadiens	Calgary Flames
July 2, 2007	Todd Bertuzzi	Anaheim Ducks	Detroit Red Wings
July 2, 2007	Ladislav Nagy	Los Angeles Kings	Dallas Stars
July 2, 2007	Kyle Calder	Los Angeles Kings	Detroit Red Wings
July 2, 2007	Tom Preissing	Los Angeles Kings	Ottawa Senators
July 2, 2007	Michal Handzus	Los Angeles Kings	Chicago Blackhawks
July 2, 2007	Ken Klee	Atlanta Thrashers	Colorado Avalanche
July 2, 2007	Robert Lang	Chicago Blackhawks	Detroit Red Wings
July 2, 2007	Greg de Vries	Nashville Predators	Atlanta Thrashers
July 2, 2007	Radek Bonk	Nashville Predators	Montreal Canadiens
July 2, 2007	Bryan Smolinski	Montreal Canadiens	Vancouver Canucks
July 2, 2007	Sheldon Brookbank	Columbus Blue Jackets	Nashville Predators
July 3, 2007	Brad Isbister	Vancouver Canucks	New York Rangers
July 3, 2007	Byron Ritchie	Vancouver Canucks	Calgary Flames
July 3, 2007	Owen Nolan	Calgary Flames	Phoenix Coyotes
July 3, 2007	Dainius Zubrus	New Jersey Devils	Buffalo Sabres
July 3, 2007	Karel Rachunek	New Jersey Devils	New York Rangers
July 3, 2007	Curtis Sanford	Vancouver Canucks	St. Louis Blues
July 3, 2007	Eric Belanger	Minnesota Wild	Atlanta Thrashers
July 3, 2007	Brad Stuart	Los Angeles Kings	Calgary Flames
July 3, 2007	Brad Lukowich	Tampa Bay Lightning	New Jersey Devils
July 4, 2007	Tom Kostopoulos	Montreal Canadiens	Los Angeles Kings
July 4, 2007	Ruslan Fedotenko	Tampa Bay Lightning	
July 5, 2007	Anders Eriksson	Calgary Flames	Columbus Blue Jackets
July 5, 2007	Kevin Weekes	New Jersey Devils	New York Rangers
July 5, 2007	Jamie Rivers	Montreal Canadiens	St. Louis Blues
July 5, 2007	Bill Guerin	New York Islanders	San Jose Sharks
July 5, 2007	Mike Comrie	New York Islanders	Ottawa Senators
July 5, 2007	Jocelyn Thibault	Buffalo Sabres	Pittsburgh Penguins
July 6, 2007	Shane Hnidy	Anaheim Ducks	Atlanta Thrashers
July 6, 2007	Sean Hill	Minnesota Wild	New York Islanders
July 6, 2007	Scott Clemmensen	Toronto Maple Leafs	New Jersey Devils
July 6, 2007	Dan Jancevski	Tampa Bay Lightning	Montreal Canadiens
July 6, 2007	Dan Ellis	Nashville Predators	Dallas Stars
July 6, 2007	Shane Willis	Nashville Predators	Carolina Hurricanes
July 8, 2007	Joey MacDonald	New York Islanders	Boston Bruins
July 9, 2007	Dallas Drake	Detroit Red Wings	St. Louis Blues
July 9, 2007	Mike York	Phoenix Coyotes	Philadelphia Flyers
July 9, 2007	Aaron Miller	Vancouver Canucks	Los Angeles Kings
July 9, 2007	Todd Fedoruk	Dallas Stars	Philadelphia Flyers
July 10, 2007	Vitaly Vishnevskiy	New Jersey Devils	Nashville Predators
July 10, 2007	Joe Motzko	Washington Capitals	Anaheim Ducks
July 12, 2007	Aaron Johnson	New York Islanders	Columbus Blue Jackets
July 12, 2007	Sheldon Souray	Edmonton Oilers	Montreal Canadiens
July 13, 2007	Alexandre Giroux	Atlanta Thrashers	Washington Capitals
July 13, 2007	Jeff Taffe	Pittsburgh Penguins	Phoenix Coyotes
July 18, 2007	Brad Norton	San Jose Sharks	Detroit Red Wings
July 18, 2007	Dan LaCouture	Anaheim Ducks	New Jersey Devils
July 19, 2007	Ty Conklin	Pittsburgh Penguins	Buffalo Sabres
July 19, 2007	David Aebischer	Phoenix Coyotes	Montreal Canadiens
July 24, 2007	Ian Moran	New Jersey Devils	Anaheim Ducks
July 26, 2007	Martin Gelinas	Nashville Predators	Florida Panthers
July 27, 2007	Alexei Semenov	San Jose Sharks	Florida Panthers
July 27, 2007	Wade Flaherty	Chicago Blackhawks	Vancouver Canucks
August 2, 2007	Dustin Penner	Edmonton Oilers	Anaheim Ducks
August 3, 2007	Patrice Brisebois	Montreal Canadiens	Colorado Avalanche
August 7, 2007	Arron Asham	New Jersey Devils	New York Islanders
August 7, 2007	Kris Beech	Columbus Blue Jackets	Washington Capitals
August 8, 2007	Luke Richardson	Ottawa Senators	Tampa Bay Lightning
August 8, 2007	Mike Weaver	Pittsburgh Penguins	Los Angeles Kings
August 8, 2007	Karel Pilar	Atlanta Thrashers	Toronto Maple Leafs
August 10, 2007	Andy Sutton	New York Islanders	Atlanta Thrashers
August 13, 2007	Alex Auld	Phoenix Coyotes	Florida Panthers
August 15, 2007	Josef Vasicek	New York Islanders	Carolina Hurricanes
August 20, 2007	Wyatt Smith	Colorado Avalanche	Minnesota Wild
August 20, 2007	Serge Payer	Minnesota Wild	Ottawa Senators
August 20, 2007	Jon Klemm	Los Angeles Kings	Dallas Stars
August 21, 2007	Michael Peca	Columbus Blue Jackets	Toronto Maple Leafs
August 28, 2007	Jean-Sebastien Aubin	Los Angeles Kings	Toronto Maple Leafs
August 30, 2007	Joel Kwiatkowski	Atlanta Thrashers	Pittsburgh Penguins
August 31, 2007	Tony Salmelainen	Toronto Maple Leafs	Montreal Canadiens
September 4, 2007	Jeremy Roenick	San Jose Sharks	Phoenix Coyotes
September 4, 2007	Josh Langfeld	Nashville Predators	Detroit Red Wings
September 28, 2007	Mark Smith	Calgary Flames	San Jose Sharks
September 28, 2007	Brent Sopel	Chicago Blackhawks	Vancouver Canucks
October 1, 2007	Adam Hall	Pittsburgh Penguins	Minnesota Wild
October 3, 2007	Glen Metropolit	Boston Bruins	St. Louis Blues
October 4, 2007	Mike Johnson	St. Louis Blues	Montreal Canadiens
October 7, 2007	Jim Dowd	Philadelphia Flyers	New Jersey Devils
October 9, 2007	Rory Fitzpatrick	Philadelphia Flyers	Vancouver Canucks
November 1, 2007	Nolan Pratt	Buffalo Sabres	Tampa Bay Lightning
January 17, 2008	Curtis Joseph	Calgary Flames	Phoenix Coyotes
February 25, 2008	Darren McCarty	Detroit Red Wings	Calgary Flames
February 25, 2008	Peter Forsberg	Colorado Avalanche	Nashville Predators
February 2, 2008	Brian Boucher	San Jose Sharks	Columbus Blue Jackets

== Trades ==
=== July ===
Jun1 1, 2007	To Boston Bruins Manny Fernandez	To Minnesota Wild Petr Kalus; 4th-round pick in 2009 (#116 - Alexander Fallstrom)
July 1, 2007	To Edmonton Oilers Joni Pitkanen; Geoff Sanderson; 3rd-round pick in 2009 (#82 - Cameron Abney)	To Philadelphia Flyers Joffrey Lupul; Jason Smith
July 4, 2007	To Tampa Bay Lightning Bryce Lampman	To New York Rangers Mitch Fritz
July 5, 2007	To Edmonton Oilers Allan Rourke; 3rd-round pick in 2008 (#73 - Kirill Petrov)	To New York Islanders 2nd-round pick in 2008 (#53 - Travis Hamonic)
July 17, 2007	To Boston Bruins Peter Schaefer	To Ottawa Senators Shean Donovan
July 17, 2007	To Carolina Hurricanes Matt Cullen	To New York Rangers Andrew Hutchinson; Joe Barnes; 3rd-round pick in 2008 (#75 - Evgeny Grachev)
July 23, 2007	To St. Louis Blues Hannu Toivonen	To Boston Bruins Carl Soderberg

=== August ===
August 1, 2007	To Vancouver Canucks Zack Fitzgerald	To St. Louis Blues Francois-Pierre Guenette
August 11, 2007	To Chicago Blackhawks Kevyn Adams	To Phoenix Coyotes Radim Vrbata

=== September ===
September 11, 2007	To Boston Bruins Petteri Nokelainen	To New York Islanders Ben Walter conditional 2nd-round pick in 2009^{1} (CBJ - #56 - Kevin Lynch)^{2}
September 24, 2007	To Anaheim Ducks Mark Mowers	To Boston Bruins Nathan Saunders; Brett Skinner

1. The conditions of this pick were if Nokelainen plays 50 games in the 2007-08 NHL Season or 90 total games in the 2008-09 NHL Season with the Bruins. The conditions were met on March 22, 2008 when Nokelainen played his 50th game of the season with the Bruins.
2. The Islanders' acquired second-round pick went to the Columbus as the result of a trade on June 27, 2009 that sent a third-round and fourth-round pick in the 2009 entry draft to the Islanders in exchange for this pick.

=== October ===
October 11, 2007	To New York Rangers P.A. Parenteau	To Chicago Blackhawks conditional 7th-round pick in 2008^{1}

1. The conditions of this pick are unknown and was not exercised.

=== November ===
November 8, 2007	To Colorado Avalanche Jason Bacashihua	To St. Louis Blues future considerations
November 15, 2007	To Anaheim Ducks Geoff Platt; Bruno St. Jacques	To Columbus Blue Jackets Aaron Rome; Clay Wilson
November 19, 2007	To Dallas Stars Bryce Lampman	To Tampa Bay Lightning Mario Scalzo
November 19, 2007	To Anaheim Ducks Brian Sutherby	To Washington Capitals 2nd-round pick in 2009 (ATL - #45 - Jeremy Morin)^{1}

1. Montreal's acquired second-round pick went to Atlanta as the result of a trade on February 16, 2009 that sent Mathieu Schneider and a conditional third-round pick in the 2009 entry draft to Montreal in exchange for a third-round pick in the 2010 entry draft and this pick.
  Montreal previously acquired this pick in a trade on February 26, 2008 that sent Cristobal Huet to Washington in exchange for this pick.

=== December ===
December 6, 2007	To Boston Bruins Alex Auld	To Phoenix Coyotes Nate DiCasmirro; 5th-round pick in 2009 (OTT - #146 - Jeff Costello)^{1}
December 10, 2007	To Dallas Stars Jussi Timonen	To Philadelphia Flyers conditional pick in 2009^{2}
December 10, 2007	To Los Angeles Kings 6th-round pick in 2008 (CHI - #179 - Braden Birch)^{3}	To Dallas Stars Yevgeny Fyodorov
December 14, 2007	To St. Louis Blues Andy McDonald	To Anaheim Ducks Doug Weight; Michal Birner; 7th-round pick in 2008 (STL - #185 - Paul Karpowich)^{4}
December 18, 2007	To Chicago Blackhawks Ben Eager	To Philadelphia Flyers Jim Vandermeer

1. Phoenix's acquired fifth-round pick went to Ottawa as the result of a trade on June 25, 2008, that sent Brian McGrattan to the Phoenix for this pick.
2. Conditions of this pick are unknown.
3. Los Angeles' acquired sixth-round pick went to Chicago as the result of a trade on June 21, 2008 that sent a sixth-round pick in the 2009 entry draft to Los Angeles in exchange for this pick.
4. Los Angeles' acquired seventh-round pick was re-acquired as the result of a trade on June 21, 2008 that sent a seventh-round pick in the 2009 entry draft to Los Angeles in exchange for this pick.
  Los Angeles previously acquired this pick as the result of a trade on February 26, 2008 that sent Jean-Sebastien Aubin to Anaheim in exchange for this pick.

=== January ===
January 2, 2008	To Boston Bruins Shane Hnidy; 6th-round pick in 2008 (#173 - Nicholas Tremblay)^{1}	To Anaheim Ducks Brandon Bochenski
January 9, 2008	To New York Islanders Matt Keith	To Anaheim Ducks Darryl Bootland
January 10, 2008	To Florida Panthers Magnus Johansson	To Chicago Blackhawks 7th-round pick in 2009 (#195 - Paul Phillips)
January 15, 2008	To Tampa Bay Lightning Junior Lessard	To Dallas Stars Dan Jancevski
January 17, 2008	To Chicago Blackhawks Craig Adams	To Carolina Hurricanes conditional 7th-round pick in 2009^{2}
January 22, 2008	To Columbus Blue Jackets Mark Rycroft	To Colorado Avalanche Darcy Campbell; Philippe Dupuis
January 29, 2008	To San Jose Sharks Jody Shelley	To Columbus Blue Jackets 6th-round pick in 2009 (CHI - #177 - David Pacan)^{3}
January 31, 2008	To Pittsburgh Penguins David Gove	To Carolina Hurricanes Joe Jensen

1. Also included in the trade: Anaheim relinquished their previously acquired option to swap fourth-round picks in the 2008 entry draft.
2. The condition was if Chicago re-sign Adams before his contract expired at the end of the 2008–09 NHL season. The condition was not met when Adams was claimed by Pittsburgh off waivers from Chicago on March 4, 2009.
3. Atlanta's acquired sixth-round pick went to Chicago as the result of a trade on June 27, 2009, that sent a fifth-round pick in 2010 entry draft to Atlanta in exchange for this pick.
  Atlanta previously acquired this pick as the result of a trade on January 14, 2009, that sent Jason Williams to Columbus in exchange for Clay Wilson and this pick.

=== February ===
February 1, 2008	To Edmonton Oilers Curtis Glencross	To Columbus Blue Jackets Dick Tarnstrom
February 7, 2008	To San Jose Sharks J.D. Forrest	To Carolina Hurricanes future considerations
February 8, 2008	To Montreal Canadiens Brett Engelhardt	To Detroit Red Wings Francis Lemieux
February 11, 2008	To Ottawa Senators Cory Stillman; Mike Commodore	To Carolina Hurricanes Patrick Eaves; Joe Corvo
February 19, 2008	To Philadelphia Flyers Jaroslav Modry	To Los Angeles Kings 3rd-round pick in 2008 (#88 - Geordie Wudrick)
February 20, 2008	To Calgary Flames Jim Vandermeer	To Philadelphia Flyers 3rd-round pick in 2009 (#81 - Adam Morrison)
February 25, 2008	To Philadelphia Flyers Vaclav Prospal	To Tampa Bay Lightning Alexandre Picard conditional pick in 2009^{1} (2nd-round - #52 - Richard Pánik)
February 26, 2008	To Minnesota Wild Chris Simon	To New York Islanders 6th-round pick in 2008 (#175 - Justin DiBenedetto)
February 26, 2008	To Atlanta Thrashers Joe Motzko	To Washington Capitals Alexandre Giroux
February 26, 2008	To Pittsburgh Penguins Marian Hossa; Pascal Dupuis	To Atlanta Thrashers Colby Armstrong; Erik Christensen; Angelo Esposito; 1st-round pick in 2008 (#29 - Daultan Leveille)
February 26, 2008	To Dallas Stars Brad Richards; Johan Holmqvist	To Tampa Bay Lightning Mike Smith; Jussi Jokinen; Jeff Halpern; 4th-round pick in 2009 (EDM - #99 - Kyle Bigos)^{1}
February 26, 2008	To New York Islanders Rob Davison	To San Jose Sharks 7th-round pick in 2008 (#186 - Jason Demers)
February 26, 2008	To San Jose Sharks Brian Campbell; 1st-round pick in 2008 (#26 - Tyler Ennis)	To Buffalo Sabres Steve Bernier; 7th-round pick in 2008 (#194 - Drew Daniels)
February 26, 2008	To Ottawa Senators Martin Lapointe	To Chicago Blackhawks 6th-round pick in 2008 (#169 - Ben Smith)
February 26, 2008	To Detroit Red Wings Brad Stuart	To Los Angeles Kings 2nd-round pick in 2008 (COL - #61 - Peter Delmas)^{2} 4th-round pick in 2009 (ATL - #120 - Ben Chiarot)^{3}
February 26, 2008	To New York Rangers Christian Backman	To St. Louis Blues 4th-round pick in 2008 (NYR - #111 - Dale Weise)^{4}
February 26, 2008	To Phoenix Coyotes Al Montoya; Marcel Hossa	To New York Rangers Fredrik Sjostrom; Josh Gratton; David LeNeveu conditional 5th-round pick in 2009^{5} (#127 - Roman Horak)
February 26, 2008	To Nashville Predators Brandon Bochenski	To Anaheim Ducks future considerations
February 26, 2008	To Nashville Predators Jan Hlavac	To Tampa Bay Lightning 7th-round pick in 2008 (PHI - #196 - Joacim Eriksson)^{6}
February 26, 2008	To Pittsburgh Penguins Hal Gill	To Toronto Maple Leafs 2nd-round pick in 2008 (#60 - Jimmy Hayes); 5th-round pick in 2009 (PIT - #151 - Andy Bathgate)^{7}
February 26, 2008	To Colorado Avalanche Ruslan Salei	To Florida Panthers Karlis Skrastins; 3rd-round pick in 2008 (#80 - Adam Comrie)
February 26, 2008	To Florida Panthers Wade Belak	To Toronto Maple Leafs 5th-round pick in 2008 (#130 - Jerome Flaake)
February 26, 2008	To Florida Panthers Chad Kilger	To Toronto Maple Leafs 3rd-round pick in 2008 (STL - #70 - James Livingston)^{8}
February 26, 2008	To Anaheim Ducks Jay Leach	To Tampa Bay Lightning Brandon Segal; 7th-round pick in 2008 (#203 - David Carle)
February 26, 2008	To Anaheim Ducks Jean-Sebastien Aubin	To Los Angeles Kings 7th-round pick in 2008 (STL - #185 - Paul Karpowich)^{9}
February 26, 2008	To Anaheim Ducks Marc-Andre Bergeron	To New York Islanders 3rd-round pick in 2008 (#73 - Kirill Petrov)
February 26, 2008	To Chicago Blackhawks Andrew Ladd	To Carolina Hurricanes Tuomo Ruutu
February 26, 2008	To New Jersey Devils Bryce Salvador	To St. Louis Blues Cam Janssen
February 26, 2008	To Washington Capitals Sergei Fedorov	To Columbus Blue Jackets Theo Ruth
February 26, 2008	To Washington Capitals Cristobal Huet	To Montreal Canadiens 2nd-round pick in 2009 (ATL - #45 - Jeremy Morin)^{10}
February 26, 2008	To Washington Capitals Matt Cooke	To Vancouver Canucks Matt Pettinger
February 26, 2008	To Colorado Avalanche Adam Foote	To Columbus Blue Jackets conditional 1st-round pick in 2008 in 2009^{11} (PHI - #19 - Luca Sbisa)^{12} conditional 4th-round pick in 2009^{13} (#94 - David Savard)
February 28, 2008	To Phoenix Coyotes Steven Goertzen	To Columbus Blue Jackets Nate DiCasmirro

1. The condition of this pick was Tampa Bay would receive a second-round pick if Philadelphia made the 2008 Eastern Conference Final otherwise the pick would be a third-round pick. The condition of a second-round pick was met on May 3, 2008.
2. Minnesota's acquired fourth-round pick went to Edmonton as the result of a trade on June 27, 2009, that sent Kyle Brodziak and a sixth-round pick in the 2009 entry draft to Minnesota in exchange for a fifth-round pick in the 2009 entry draft and this pick.
  Minnesota previously acquired this pick as the result of a trade on June 29, 2008, that sent Brian Rolston to the Tampa Bay Lightning in exchange for this pick (being conditional at the time of trade). The conditions – Ryan Malone is signed by Tampa Bay, Brian Rolston is not – have been verified on June 30, 2008.
3. Los Angeles' acquired second-round pick went to Colorado Avalanche as the result of a trade on June 21, 2008 that sent Brad Richardson to Los Angeles in exchange for this pick.
4. Los Angeles' acquired fourth-round pick went to Atlanta as the result of a trade on June 27, 2009, that sent a fourth-round pick (#95 overall) in the 2009 entry draft to Los Angeles in exchange for a fourth-round pick (#117 overall) and a seventh-round pick in the 2009 entry draft along with this pick.
5. Nashville's acquired fourth-round pick was re-acquired as the result of a trade on June 21, 2008 that sent a seventh-round pick in 2008 entry draft and a fourth-round pick in the 2009 entry draft to Nashville in exchange for this pick.
  Nashville previously acquired this pick as the result of a trade on June 20, 2008 that sent Chris Mason to St. Louis in exchange for this pick.
6. The conditions of this pick are if David LeNeveu is not signed by Rangers and Al Montoya plays less than 15 games for the Coyotes in the 2008–09 NHL season. The conditions were met when LeNeveu signed with Anaheim as a free agent on July 7th, 2008 and Montoya played in 5 games for the Coyotes.
7. Tampa Bay's acquired seventh-round pick went to Philadelphia as the result of a trade on June 18, 2008 that sent Vaclav Prospal to Tampa Bay in exchange for a conditional fourth-round pick in the 2009 entry draft and this pick.
8. Pittsburgh re-acquired their fifth-round pick from the Rangers as the result of a trade on June 27, 2009, that sent Chad Johnson to New York in exchange for this pick.
  The Rangers previously acquired this pick as the result of a trade on July 14, 2008, that sent Ryan Hollweg to Toronto in exchange for this pick.
9. Toronto's acquired third-round pick went to St. Louis as the result of a trade on June 19, 2008 that sent Jamal Mayers to Toronto in exchange for this pick.
10. St. Louis' seventh-round pick was re-acquired as the result of a trade on June 21, 2008 that sent a seventh-round pick in the 2009 entry draft to Los Angeles in exchange for this pick.
11. Montreal's acquired second-round pick went to Atlanta as the result of a trade on February 16, 2009 that sent Mathieu Schneider and a conditional third-round pick in the 2009 entry draft to Montreal in exchange for a third-round pick in the 2010 entry draft and this pick.
12. The condition of this pick was if Colorado made the 2008 Stanley Cup playoffs, Columbus would receive a first-round pick in the 2008 entry draft otherwise Columbus would receive a first-round pick in the 2009 entry draft. Colorado made the playoff so the pick was for the 2008 entry draft.
13. Columbus' acquired first-round pick went to Philadelphia as the result of a trade on June 20, 2008 that sent R.J. Umberger and a fourth-round pick in the 2008 entry draft to Columbus in exchange for a third-round pick in the 2008 entry draft and this pick.
14. The condition of this pick was if Colorado re-sign Foote. The condition was met when Foote re-signed with Colorado on June 30th, 2008.

=== May ===
May 27, 2008	To Columbus Blue Jackets Jonathan Sigalet	To Boston Bruins Matt Marquardt

=== June ===
The 2008 NHL entry draft was held on June 20–21, 2008.

June 4, 2008	To St. Louis Blues T.J. Fast	To Los Angeles Kings 5th-round pick in 2009 (FLA - #138 - Wade Megan)^{1}
June 6, 2008	To Edmonton Oilers Ryan Potulny	To Philadelphia Flyers Danny Syvret
June 10, 2008	To Anaheim Ducks 3rd-round pick in 2008 (#85 - Brandon McMillan)	To Minnesota Wild Marc-Andre Bergeron
June 10, 2008	To Dallas Stars conditional pick in 2009^{1}	To Colorado Avalanche Marty Sertich
June 18, 2008	To Tampa Bay Lightning Vaclav Prospal	To Philadelphia Flyers 7th-round pick in 2008 (#196 - Joacim Eriksson) conditional 4th-round pick in 2009^{2} (TBL - #93 - Alex Hutchings)^{3}
June 19, 2008	To Nashville Predators 5th-round pick in 2009 (TBL - #148 - Michael Zador)^{4}	To Carolina Hurricanes Darcy Hordichuk conditional 5th-round pick in 2009 in 2010^{5} (PHX - #138 - Louis Domingue)^{6}
June 19, 2008	To Toronto Maple Leafs Jamal Mayers	To St. Louis Blues 3rd-round pick in 2008 (#70 - James Livingston)
June 20, 2008	To Toronto Maple Leafs 1st-round pick in 2008 (#7 - Luke Schenn)	To New York Islanders 1st-round pick in 2008 (NSH - #7 - Colin Wilson)^{1} conditional pick in 2008 (3rd-round - CHI - #68 - Shawn Lalonde)^{2} in 2009^{3} conditional pick in 2008 in 2009^{3} (2nd-round - ANA - #37 - Mat Clark)^{4}
June 20, 2008	To Nashville Predators 1st-round pick in 2008 (#7 - Colin Wilson)	To New York Islanders 1st-round pick in 2008 (#9 - Josh Bailey); 2nd-round pick in 2008 (#40 - Aaron Ness)
June 20, 2008	To Calgary Flames Michael Cammalleri; 2nd-round pick in 2008 (#48 - Mitch Wahl)	To Los Angeles Kings 1st-round pick in 2008 (ANA - #17 - Jake Gardiner)^{5} 2nd-round pick in 2009 (CAR - #51 - Brian Dumoulin)^{6}
June 20, 2008	To Los Angeles Kings 1st-round pick in 2008 (BUF - #12 - Tyler Myers)^{7}	To Anaheim Ducks 1st-round pick in 2008 (#17 - Jake Gardiner); 1st-round pick in 2008 (PHX - #28 - Viktor Tikhonov)^{8}
June 20, 2008	To Buffalo Sabres 1st-round pick in 2008 (#12 - Tyler Myers)	To Los Angeles Kings 1st-round pick in 2008 (#13 - Colten Teubert); 3rd-round pick in 2009 (CGY - #74 - Ryan Howse)^{9}
June 20, 2008	To Nashville Predators 1st-round pick in 2008 (#18 - Chet Pickard); 3rd-round pick in 2009 (#70 - Taylor Beck)	To Ottawa Senators 1st-round pick in 2008 (#15 - Erik Karlsson)
June 20, 2008	To Columbus Blue Jackets R.J. Umberger; 4th-round pick in 2008 (#118 - Drew Olson)	To Philadelphia Flyers 1st-round pick in 2008 (#19 - Luca Sbisa); 3rd-round pick in 2008 (#67 - Marc-Andre Bourdon)
June 20, 2008	To St. Louis Blues Chris Mason	To Nashville Predators 4th-round pick in 2008 (NYR - #111 - Dale Weise)^{10}
June 20, 2008	To Phoenix Coyotes Olli Jokinen	To Florida Panthers Keith Ballard; Nick Boynton; 2nd-round pick in 2008 (PHX - #49 - Jared Staal)^{11}
June 20, 2008	To New Jersey Devils 1st-round pick in 2008 (MIN - #23 - Tyler Cuma)^{12} 2nd-round pick in 2008 (#54 - Patrice Cormier)	To Washington Capitals 1st-round pick in 2008 (#21 - Anton Gustafsson)
June 20, 2008	To New Jersey Devils 1st-round pick in 2008 (#24 - Mattias Tedenby); 3rd-round pick in 2009 (#73 - Alexander Urbom)	To Minnesota Wild 1st-round pick in 2008 (#23 - Tyler Cuma)
June 20, 2008	To Montreal Canadiens Alex Tanguay; 5th-round pick in 2008 (#138 - Maxim Trunev)	To Calgary Flames 1st-round pick in 2008 (#25 - Greg Nemisz); 2nd-round pick in 2009 (COL - #49 - Stefan Elliott)^{13}
June 20, 2008	To Washington Capitals 1st-round pick in 2008 (#27 - John Carlson)	To Philadelphia Flyers Steve Eminger; 3rd-round pick in 2008 (#84 - Jacob DeSerres)
June 20, 2008	To Phoenix Coyotes 1st-round pick in 2008 (#28 - Viktor Tikhonov)	To Anaheim Ducks 2nd-round pick in 2008 (#35 - Nicolas Deschamps); 2nd-round pick in 2008 (#39 - Eric O'Dell)
June 21, 2008	To Phoenix Coyotes 2nd-round pick in 2008 (FLA - #46 - Colby Robak)^{1} 3rd-round pick in 2008 (#76 - Mathieu Brodeur)	To Nashville Predators 2nd-round pick in 2008 (#38 - Roman Josi)
June 21, 2008	To Phoenix Coyotes 2nd-round pick in 2008 (#49 - Jared Staal); 4th-round pick in 2009 (#105 - Justin Weller)	To Florida Panthers 2nd-round pick in 2008 (#46 - Colby Robak)
June 21, 2008	To Los Angeles Kings Brad Richardson	To Colorado Avalanche 2nd-round pick in 2008 (#61 - Peter Delmas)
June 21, 2008	To San Jose Sharks 3rd-round pick in 2008 (#62 - Justin Daniels)	To Tampa Bay Lightning 4th-round pick in 2008 (#117 - James Wright); 5th-round pick in 2008 ( #147 - Kyle DeCoste); 3rd-round pick in 2009 (PHI - #87 - Simon Bertilsson)^{2}
June 21, 2008	To Chicago Blackhawks 3rd-round pick in 2008 (#68 - Shawn Lalonde)	To New York Islanders 3rd-round pick in 2008 (#72 - Jyri Niemi); 4th-round pick in 2008 ( #102 - David Ullstrom)
June 21, 2008	To Buffalo Sabres 3rd-round pick in 2008 (#81 - Corey Fienhage); 4th-round pick in 2008 (#101 - Justin Jokinen)	To Los Angeles Kings 3rd-round pick in 2008 (#74 - Andrew Campbell)
June 21, 2008	To New York Rangers 3rd-round pick in 2008 (#90 - Tomas Kundratek)	To Phoenix Coyotes Alex Bourret
June 21, 2008	To San Jose Sharks 4th-round pick in 2008 (#92 - Samuel Groulx)	To Los Angeles Kings 4th-round pick in 2009 (ATL - #117 - Edward Pasquale)^{3} 5th-round pick in 2010 (#148 - Kevin Gravel)
June 21, 2008	To Boston Bruins 4th-round pick in 2008 (#97 - Jamie Arniel)	To Columbus Blue Jackets 4th-round pick in 2008 (#107 - Steven Delisle); 5th-round pick in 2008 (#137 - Brent Regner)
June 21, 2008	To San Jose Sharks 4th-round pick in 2008 (#106 - Harri Sateri)	To Nashville Predators 7th-round pick in 2008 (#207 - Anders Lindback); 4th-round pick in 2009 (#98 - Craig Smith)
June 21, 2008	To Nashville Predators 7th-round pick in 2008 (#201 - Jani Lajunen); 4th-round pick in 2009 (#110 - Nick Oliver)	To New York Rangers 4th-round pick in 2008 (#111 - Dale Weise)
June 21, 2008	To Los Angeles Kings 6th-round pick in 2009 (#179 - Brandon Kozun)	To Chicago Blackhawks 6th-round pick in 2008 (#179 - Braden Birch)
June 21, 2008	To Los Angeles Kings 7th-round pick in 2009 (#198 - Nic Dowd)	To Chicago Blackhawks 7th-round pick in 2008 (#185 - Paul Karpowich)
June 21, 2008	To Anaheim Ducks 7th-round pick in 2008 (#208 - Nick Pryor)	To Philadelphia Flyers 7th-round pick in 2008 (#196 - Oliver Lauridsen)
June 24, 2008	To Philadelphia Flyers Janne Niskala	To Nashville Predators Triston Grant; 7th-round pick in 2009 (STL - #202 - Maxwell Tardy)^{1}
June 24, 2008	To Colorado Avalanche Matt Hendricks	To Boston Bruins Johnny Boychuk
June 25, 2008	To Phoenix Coyotes Brian McGrattan	To Ottawa Senators 5th-round pick in 2009 (#146 - Jeff Costello)
June 28, 2008	To Tampa Bay Lightning Gary Roberts; Ryan Malone	To Pittsburgh Penguins conditional pick in 2009^{2} (3rd-round - #63 - Ben Hanowski)
June 29, 2008	To Edmonton Oilers Lubomir Visnovsky	To Los Angeles Kings Jarret Stoll; Matt Greene
June 29, 2008	To Tampa Bay Lightning Brian Rolston	To Minnesota Wild conditional pick in 2009^{3} (STL - 4th-round - #99 - Kyle Bigos)^{4}
June 30, 2008	To Philadelphia Flyers Tim Ramholt	To Calgary Flames Kyle Greentree
June 30, 2008	To Tampa Bay Lightning Janne Niskala	To Philadelphia Flyers 6th-round pick in 2009 (#153 - Dave Labrecque)

1. Los Angeles' acquired fifth-round pick went to Florida as the result of a trade on June 27, 2008, that sent a third-round pick in the 2010 entry draft to the Los Angeles in exchange for a fifth-round pick (#107 overall) in the 2009 entry draft and this pick.
2. The conditions of this pick are unknown.
3. The condition of this pick was if Prospal is re-signed by Tampa Bay prior to the 2008–09 NHL season. The condition was met on June 30, 2008.
4. Tampa Bay re-acquired the pick as the result of a trade on November 7, 2008, that sent Matt Carle and a third-round pick in the 2009 entry draft to Philadelphia in exchange for Steve Downie, Steve Eminger and this pick.
5. Nashville's acquired fifth-round pick went to Tampa Bay as the result of a trade on June 27, 2008, that sent a fifth-round pick in the 2010 entry draft to Nashville in exchange for this pick.
6. The condition of this pick was if Hordichuk is re-signed by Carolina prior to the 2008–09 NHL season the pick would be in the 2009 entry draft and if not, the pick would be in the 2010 entry draft. The condition was not met when Hordichuk signed with Vancouver on July 1, 2008.
7. Carolina's acquired fifth-round pick went to Phoenix as a result of a trade on May 13, 2010, that sent Jared Staal to Carolina in exchange for this pick.
8. The Islanders' acquired first-round pick went to Nashville as the result of a trade on June 20, 2008, that sent a first-round pick (9th overall) and a second-round pick in the 2008 entry draft to the Islanders in exchange for this pick.
9. The Islanders' acquired third-round pick went to Chicago as the result of a trade on June 21, 2008, that sent a third-round pick (#72 overall) and a fourth-round pick in the 2008 entry draft to Islanders in exchange for this pick.
10. The condition was the Islanders would receive a second-round pick in the 2008 entry draft and a third-round pick in the 2009 entry draft or a second-round pick in the 2009 entry draft and a third-round pick in the 2008 entry draft, at the Islanders choice – was converted on June 21, 2008.
11. Columbus' acquired second-round pick went to Anaheim as the result of a trade on June 26, 2009, that sent a first-round pick (#21 overall) in the 2009 entry draft to Columbus in exchange for a first-round pick (#26 overall) in the 2009 entry draft and this pick.
  Columbus previously acquired this pick as the result of a trade on June 26, 2009, that sent a first-round (#16 overall) and a third-round pick (#77 overall) in the 2009 entry draft to the New York Islanders in exchange for first-round pick (#26 overall), a third-round (#62 overall) and a fourth-round pick in the 2009 entry draft along with this pick.
12. Los Angeles' acquired first-round pick went to Anaheim as the result of a trade on June 20, 2008, that sent a first-round pick (#12 overall) in the 2008 entry draft to Los Angeles in exchange for a first-round pick (#28 overall) in the 2008 entry draft and this pick.
13. Los Angeles' acquired second-round pick went to Carolina as the result of a trade on March 4, 2009, that sent Justin Williams to Los Angeles in exchange for Patrick O'Sullivan and this pick.
14. Los Angeles' acquired first-round pick went to Buffalo as the result of a trade on June 20, 2008, that sent a first-round pick (#13 overall) in 2008 entry draft and a third-round pick in the 2009 entry draft to Los Angeles in exchange for this pick.
15. Anaheim's acquired first-round pick went to the Phoenix as the result of a trade on June 20, 2008, that sent two second-round picks (#35 & #39 overall) in the 2008 entry draft to Anaheim in exchange for this pick.
16. Los Angeles' acquired third-round pick went to Calgary as the result of a trade on June 27, 2009, that sent a third-round pick (#84 overall) and a fourth-round pick in the 2009 entry draft to Los Angeles in exchange for this pick.
17. The Rangers' fourth-round pick was re-acquired as the result of a trade on June 21, 2008, that sent a seventh-round pick in 2008 entry draft and a fourth-round pick in the 2009 entry draft to Nashville in exchange for this pick.
18. Phoenix's second-round pick was re-acquired as the result of a trade on June 21, 2008, that sent a second-round pick (#46 overall) in the 2008 entry draft to Florida in exchange for a fourth-round pick in the 2009 entry draft and this pick.
19. New Jersey's acquired first-round pick went to Minnesota as the result of a trade on June 20, 2008, that sent a first-round pick (#24 overall) in the 2008 entry draft and a third-round pick in 2009 entry draft to New Jersey in exchange for this pick.
20. Calgary's acquired second-round pick went to Colorado as the result of a trade on March 4, 2009, that sent Jordan Leopold to Calgary in exchange for Lawrence Nycholat, Ryan Wilson and this pick.
21. Phoenix's acquired second-round pick went to Florida as the result of a trade on June 21, 2008, that sent a second-round pick (#49 overall) in the 2008 entry draft and a fourth-round pick in the 2009 entry draft to Phoenix in exchange for this pick.
22. Tampa Bay's acquired third-round pick went to Philadelphia as the result of a trade on November 7, 2008, that sent Steve Downie, Steve Eminger, and a fourth-round pick in the 2009 entry draft to Tampa Bay in exchange for Matt Carle and this pick.
23. Los Angeles' acquired fourth-round pick went to Atlanta as the result of a trade on June 27, 2009, that sent a fourth-round pick (#95 overall) in the 2009 entry draft to Los Angeles in exchange for a fourth-round pick (#120 overall) and a seventh-round pick in the 2009 entry draft along with this pick.
24. Nashville's acquired seventh-round pick went to St. Louis as the result of a trade on June 27, 2009, that sent a seventh-round pick in the 2010 entry draft to Nashville in exchange for this pick.
25. The conditions of this pick were Pittsburgh will receive Tampa Bay's third-round pick if Tampa Bay is able to sign Malone or they will receive a fourth-round pick in the 2009 entry draft, if Tampa Bay is not able to sign Malone. The condition of a third-round pick was met when Malone signed with Tampa Bay on June 30, 2008.
26. The conditions of this pick were Minnesota will receive Tampa Bay's fourth-round pick in the 2009 entry draft if Tampa Bay is not able to sign Rolston or they will receive a fourth-round pick in the 2010 entry draft, if Tampa Bay is able to sign Rolston. The condition of a fourth-round pick in the 2009 entry draft was met when Rolston signed with New Jersey on July 1, 2008.
27. Minnesota's acquired fourth-round pick went to Edmonton as the result of a trade on June 27, 2009, that sent Kyle Brodziak and a sixth-round pick in the 2009 entry draft to Minnesota in exchange for a fifth-round pick in 2009 entry draft and this pick.

== Waivers ==
Once an NHL player has played in a certain number of games or a set number of seasons has passed since the signing of his first NHL contract (see here), that player must be offered to all of the other NHL teams before he can be assigned to a minor league affiliate.

Date	Player	New team	Previous team
September 27, 2007	Karel Pilar	Chicago Blackhawks	Atlanta Thrashers
October 2, 2007	Mike Weaver	Vancouver Canucks	Pittsburgh Penguins
October 2, 2007	Sheldon Brookbank	New Jersey Devils	Columbus Blue Jackets
October 2, 2007	Karel Pilar	Atlanta Thrashers	Chicago Blackhawks
October 10, 2007	Freddy Meyer	Phoenix Coyotes	New York Islanders
November 10, 2007	Freddy Meyer	New York Islanders	Phoenix Coyotes
November 13, 2007	Garth Murray	Florida Panthers	Montreal Canadiens
November 17, 2007	Ilya Bryzgalov	Phoenix Coyotes	Anaheim Ducks
November 22, 2007	Todd Fedoruk	Minnesota Wild	Dallas Stars
December 8, 2007	Mark Recchi	Atlanta Thrashers	Pittsburgh Penguins
January 8, 2008	Sergei Samsonov	Carolina Hurricanes	Chicago Blackhawks
January 10, 2008	Kris Beech	Vancouver Canucks	Columbus Blue Jackets
January 11, 2008	Dominic Moore	Toronto Maple Leafs	Minnesota Wild
January 23, 2008	Kris Beech	Washington Capitals	Vancouver Canucks
January 27, 2008	Kris Beech	Pittsburgh Penguins	Washington Capitals
February 21, 2008	Matt Ellis	Los Angeles Kings	Detroit Red Wings
February 22, 2008	Patrick Thoresen	Philadelphia Flyers	Edmonton Oilers

== See also ==
- 2007 NHL entry draft
- 2007 in sports
- 2008 in sports
- 2006–07 NHL transactions
- 2008–09 NHL transactions
