= Jiří Hunkes =

Czech ice hockey player

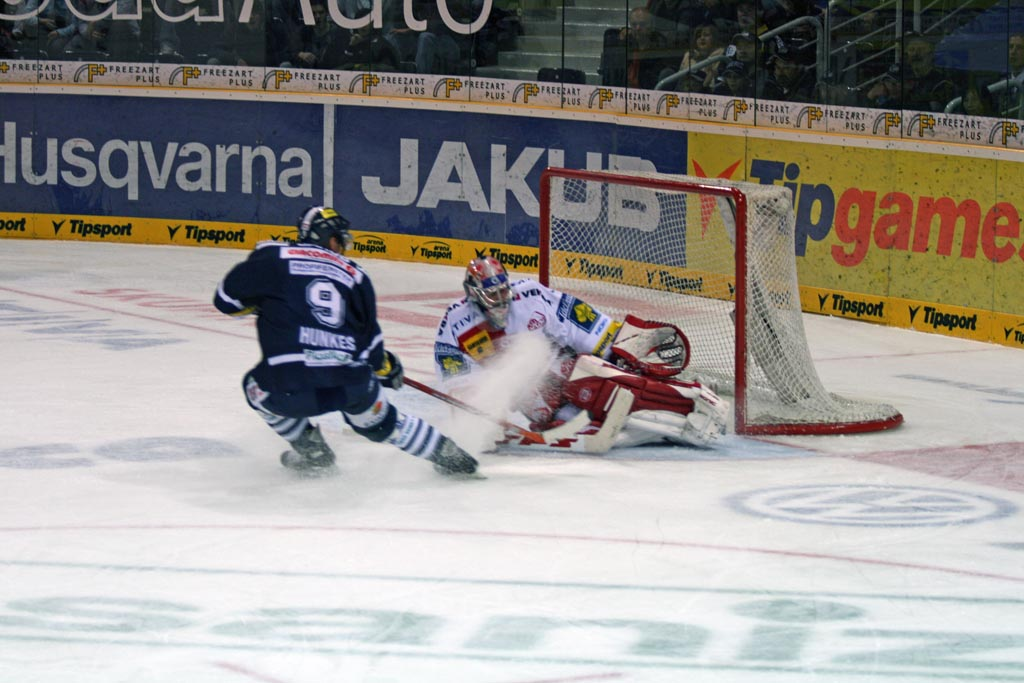
- Born: July 31, 1984 (age 40); Brno, Czechoslovakia
- Height: 6 ft 0 in (183 cm)
- Weight: 185 lb (84 kg; 13 st 3 lb)
- Position: Defence
- Shot: Right
- Played for: HC Oceláři Třinec; HC Hvězda Brno; HC Havířov Panthers; HK Jestřábi Prostějov; Lukko Rauma; Pelicans Lahti; Bílí Tygři Liberec; BK Mladá Boleslav; HC Lev Poprad; HC Lev Praha; HC Sparta Praha; HC Lada Togliatti; Schwenninger Wild Wings
- Playing career: 2002–2023

Jiří Hunkes (born July 31, 1984) is a Czech professional ice hockey defenceman currently an unrestricted free agent who most recently played for Schwenninger Wild Wings in the Deutsche Eishockey Liga (DEL). He formerly played with HC Bílí Tygři Liberec in the Czech Extraliga during the 2010–11 Czech Extraliga season.

Hunkes previously played for HC Oceláři Třinec, Lukko Rauma, Pelicans Lahti and BK Mladá Boleslav. After a season with HC Lada Togliatti of the Kontinental Hockey League (KHL), Hunkes signed his first contract in Germany, agreeing to a one-year deal with Schwenninger Wild Wings of the DEL on July 10, 2015.

In the 2016–17 season, Hunkes returned for his second year with the Wild Wings but could not repeat his performance, adding just 1 goal and 3 points in 32 contests. On March 3, 2017, it was announced that Hunkes would leave the club as a free agent.

== Career statistics ==
			Regular season					Playoffs
Season	Team	League	GP	G	A	Pts	PIM	GP	G	A	Pts	PIM
1999–00	HC Kometa Brno U18	Czech U18	48	3	7	10	36	—	—	—	—	—
2000–01	HC Oceláři Třinec U18	Czech U18	46	6	9	15	28	8	2	3	5	10
2000–01	HC Oceláři Třinec U20	Czech U20	—	—	—	—	—	2	0	0	0	2
2001–02	HC Oceláři Třinec U20	Czech U20	31	1	18	19	36	11	0	1	1	8
2002–03	HC Oceláři Třinec U20	Czech U20	29	9	11	20	55	6	0	5	5	4
2002–03	HC Oceláři Třinec	Czech	7	0	0	0	4	—	—	—	—	—
2002–03	HC Ytong Brno	Czech2	8	0	2	2	2	—	—	—	—	—
2003–04	HC Oceláři Třinec U20	Czech U20	5	3	3	6	8	—	—	—	—	—
2003–04	HC Oceláři Třinec	Czech	38	2	3	5	8	7	0	0	0	6
2003–04	HC Havířov Panthers	Czech2	9	0	0	0	10	—	—	—	—	—
2004–05	HC Oceláři Třinec U20	Czech U20	2	2	2	4	4	1	1	0	1	6
2004–05	HC Oceláři Třinec	Czech	51	0	4	4	20	—	—	—	—	—
2004–05	HK Jestřábi Prostějov	Czech3	—	—	—	—	—	2	0	0	0	0
2005–06	HC Oceláři Třinec	Czech	49	4	12	16	62	4	0	0	0	6
2005–06	HK Jestřábi Prostějov	Czech2	1	0	0	0	4	—	—	—	—	—
2006–07	Lukko	SM-liiga	33	4	3	7	40	—	—	—	—	—
2006–07	Lahti Pelicans	SM-liiga	13	2	2	4	4	6	0	0	0	2
2007–08	Bílí Tygři Liberec	Czech	51	3	8	11	62	11	1	0	1	8
2008–09	Bílí Tygři Liberec	Czech	37	0	3	3	49	3	0	0	0	4
2008–09	BK Mladá Boleslav	Czech	12	1	0	1	10	—	—	—	—	—
2009–10	Bílí Tygři Liberec	Czech	36	6	16	22	42	15	0	2	2	22
2010–11	Bílí Tygři Liberec	Czech	52	6	13	19	32	7	0	2	2	2
2011–12	Lev Poprad	KHL	48	1	10	11	32	—	—	—	—	—
2012–13	HC Lev Praha	KHL	34	1	7	8	38	—	—	—	—	—
2012–13	HC Sparta Praha	Czech	7	0	0	0	2	6	0	3	3	2
2013–14	Bílí Tygři Liberec	Czech	43	2	16	18	58	3	0	1	1	4
2014–15	HC Lada Togliatti	KHL	54	5	5	10	30	—	—	—	—	—
2015–16	Schwenninger Wild Wings	DEL	40	1	12	13	34	—	—	—	—	—
2016–17	Schwenninger Wild Wings	DEL	32	1	2	3	14	—	—	—	—	—
2017–18	HC Dynamo Pardubice	Czech	8	0	2	2	6	—	—	—	—	—
2017–18	HC Litvínov	Czech	14	3	9	12	6	—	—	—	—	—
2018–19	HC Litvínov	Czech	27	1	1	2	18	—	—	—	—	—
2019–20	VHK Vsetín	Czech2	31	2	11	13	32	—	—	—	—	—
2020–21	Anglet Hormadi Élite	Ligue Magnus	23	2	11	13	76	—	—	—	—	—
2021–22	SK Horácká Slavia Třebíč	Czech2	37	1	12	13	18	4	0	1	1	0
2022–23	SK Horácká Slavia Třebíč	Czech2	27	1	3	4	18	—	—	—	—	—
Czech totals			432	28	87	115	379	56	1	8	9	54
KHL totals			136	7	22	29	100	—	—	—	—	—
DEL totals			72	2	14	16	48	—	—	—	—	—
Czech2 totals			113	4	28	32	84	4	0	1	1	0
