= Jakub Matai =

Czech ice hockey player (born 1993)

- Born: 9 May 1993 (age 32) Kadaň, Czech Republic
- Height: 5 ft 11 in (180 cm)
- Weight: 176 lb (80 kg; 12 st 8 lb)
- Position: Forward
- Shoots: Right
- Czech team Former teams: HC Olomouc; HC Lev Poprad; HC Lev Praha
- NHL draft: Undrafted
- Playing career: 2011–present

Jakub Matai (born 9 May 1993) is a Czech professional ice hockey winger playing with HC Olomouc of the Czech Extraliga. He previously played for Lev Poprad of the Kontinental Hockey League (KHL) during the 2011–12 season, and later HC Lev Praha.
