= Jaroslav Šaršok =

Czech ice hockey player

- Born: September 21, 1990 (age 35) Prachatice, Czechoslovakia
- Height: 6 ft 6 in (198 cm)
- Weight: 214 lb (97 kg; 15 st 4 lb)
- Position: Forward
- Shoots: Right
- team Former teams: Free agent KHL; Lev Poprad
- NHL draft: Undrafted
- Playing career: 2011–present

Jaroslav Šaršok (born May 17, 1990) is a Czech professional ice hockey forward. He played seven games for Lev Poprad of the Kontinental Hockey League (KHL) during the 2011–12 season.
