= Václav Nedorost =

Czech ice hockey player (born 1982)

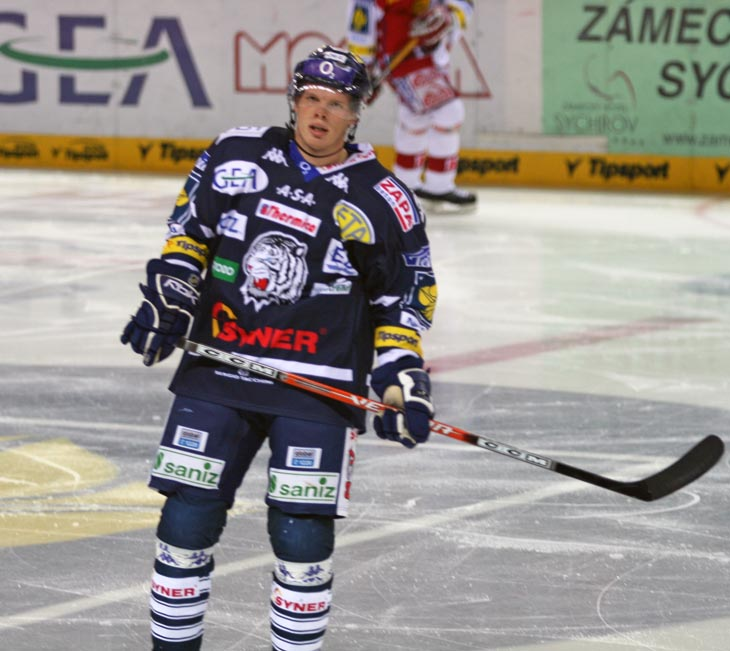
- Born: March 16, 1982 (age 44) České Budějovice, Czechoslovakia
- Height: 6 ft 0 in (183 cm)
- Weight: 171 lb (78 kg; 12 st 3 lb)
- Position: Centre
- Shot: Left
- Played for: HC České Budějovice; Colorado Avalanche; Florida Panthers; HC Bílí Tygři Liberec; Metallurg Novokuznetsk; HC Lev Poprad; HC Donbass; HC Slovan Bratislava; HC Plzeň
- NHL draft: 14th overall, 2000; Colorado Avalanche
- Playing career: 1998–2019

Václav Nedorost (born March 16, 1982) is a Czech former professional ice hockey center. He played in the National Hockey League with the Colorado Avalanche, who selected him 14th overall at the 2000 NHL entry draft, and the Florida Panthers between 2001 and 2004. The rest of his career, which lasted from 1998 to 2019, was spent in the Czech Extraliga and the Kontinental Hockey League. Internationally Nedorost played for the Czech national junior team, and won the gold medal at the 2000 and 2001 World Junior Championships.

== Playing career ==
Nedorost was drafted in the first round, 14th overall, by the Colorado Avalanche in the 2000 NHL entry draft. Drafted out of HC České Budějovice of the Czech Extraliga, Nedorost made his North American debut with Colorado's American Hockey League affiliate, the Hershey Bears, in the 2001–02 season. He also appeared in 25 NHL games for the Avalanche during the 2001–02 season, scoring two goals and two assists. Nedorost appeared in 42 more games for the Avalanche in the 2002–03 season.

On July 19, 2003, before the 2003–04 season Nedorost was traded by Colorado, along with Eric Messier, to the Florida Panthers for Peter Worrell and a 2nd round selection. He appeared in 32 games for the Panthers that season.

During the 2004–05 NHL lockout, Nedorost went to the Czech Republic to play for HC Bílí Tygři Liberec of the Czech Extraliga. After not playing the following season due to injury, Nedorost then signed for HC České Budějovice in the 2006–07 season before returning to HC Bílí Tygři Liberec the following season.

On May 19, 2010, Nedorost signed a one-year contract with Russian team, Metallurg Novokuznetsk, of the KHL.

Nedorost enjoyed two successful seasons with HC Donbass before civil unrest in Ukraine suspended Donbass' participation in the KHL. Nedorost as a free agent agreed to a one-year contract with Slovakian KHL competitor, HC Slovan Bratislava on August 4, 2014.

Returning to the Czech Extraliga for the 2018–19 season, Nedorost played his 19th and last professional year with HC Plzeň, notching 6 points in 14 playoff games before announcing his retirement on May 1, 2019.

== Executive career ==
Nedorost immediately embarked on a managerial career, accepting an assistant sporting director role working under former Avalanche draft pick and teammate, Radim Vrbata, at BK Mladá Boleslav of the Extraliga on May 1, 2019.

== Career statistics ==
=== Regular season and playoffs ===
			Regular season					Playoffs
Season	Team	League	GP	G	A	Pts	PIM	GP	G	A	Pts	PIM
1998–99	HC České Budějovice	CZE U18	3	1	5	6	—	—	—	—	—	—
1998–99	HC České Budějovice	CZE U20	39	6	15	21	20	—	—	—	—	—
1998–99	HC České Budějovice	ELH	7	0	2	2	0	—	—	—	—	—
1999–00	HC České Budějovice	CZE U20	14	4	7	11	4	—	—	—	—	—
1999–00	HC České Budějovice	ELH	38	8	6	14	6	3	0	0	0	0
2000–01	HC České Budějovice	CZE U20	1	0	1	1	0	6	2	5	7	2
2000–01	HC České Budějovice	ELH	36	3	12	15	14	—	—	—	—	—
2001–02	Hershey Bears	AHL	49	12	22	34	16	7	2	3	5	2
2001–02	Colorado Avalanche	NHL	25	2	2	4	2	—	—	—	—	—
2002–03	Hershey Bears	AHL	5	3	2	5	0	5	2	2	4	0
2002–03	Colorado Avalanche	NHL	42	4	5	9	20	—	—	—	—	—
2003–04	San Antonio Rampage	AHL	21	9	6	15	2	—	—	—	—	—
2003–04	Florida Panthers	NHL	32	4	3	7	12	—	—	—	—	—
2004–05	Bílí Tygři Liberec	ELH	48	15	18	33	20	6	0	1	1	12
2006–07	HC Mountfield	ELH	30	3	7	10	36	—	—	—	—	—
2007–08	Bílí Tygři Liberec	ELH	27	6	7	13	34	10	3	0	3	12
2008–09	Bílí Tygři Liberec	ELH	50	15	20	35	68	3	0	0	0	0
2009–10	Bílí Tygři Liberec	ELH	26	4	7	11	12	15	3	11	14	18
2010–11	Metallurg Novokuznetsk	KHL	48	8	11	19	26	—	—	—	—	—
2011–12	Lev Poprad	KHL	37	14	9	23	22	—	—	—	—	—
2012–13	HC Donbass	KHL	52	15	20	35	18	—	—	—	—	—
2013–14	HC Donbass	KHL	43	14	9	23	38	—	—	—	—	—
2014–15	Slovan Bratislava	KHL	37	10	8	18	42	—	—	—	—	—
2015–16	Slovan Bratislava	KHL	54	12	12	24	46	4	1	1	2	2
2016–17	Slovan Bratislava	KHL	36	8	5	13	52	—	—	—	—	—
2017–18	ČEZ Motor České Budějovice	CZE.2	51	16	27	43	50	10	6	5	11	8
2018–19	HC Škoda Plzeň	ELH	29	2	7	9	8	14	3	3	6	2
2020–21	HC Samson České Budějovice	CZE.4	1	0	3	3	0	—	—	—	—	—
2021–22	HC Samson České Budějovice	CZE.4	1	3	1	4	0	1	0	0	0	0
ELH totals			291	56	86	142	198	51	9	15	24	44
KHL totals			307	81	73	154	244	4	1	1	2	2
NHL totals			99	10	10	20	34	—	—	—	—	—

=== International ===
Medal record

Representing Czech Republic

Ice hockey

World Junior Championships
Gold medal – first place	2000 Umeå	
Gold medal – first place	2001 Moscow	

Year	Team	Event	Result	GP	G	A	Pts	PIM
2000	Czech Republic	WJC	1st place, gold medalist(s)	7	0	1	1	6
2000	Czech Republic	WJC18	6th	6	4	1	5	0
2001	Czech Republic	WJC	1st place, gold medalist(s)	7	4	5	9	0
Junior totals				20	8	7	15	6

Awards and achievements
Preceded by Mikhail Kuleshov	Colorado Avalanche first-round draft pick 2000	Succeeded by Jonas Johansson
