= Tomáš Netík =

Czech ice hockey player

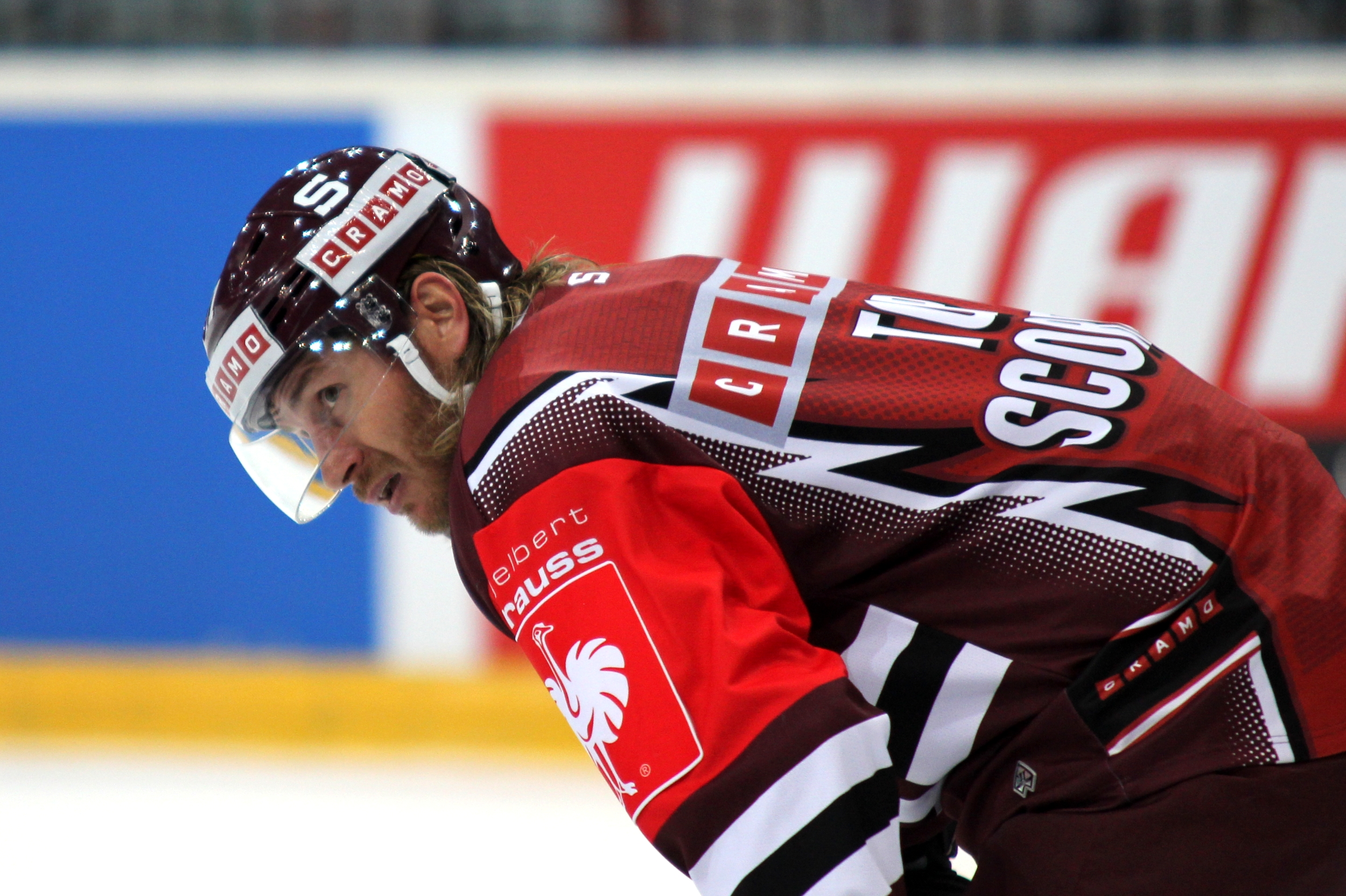
- Tomáš Netík
- Born: April 28, 1982 (age 44) Prague, Czechoslovakia
- Height: 5 ft 10 in (178 cm)
- Weight: 170 lb (77 kg; 12 st 2 lb)
- Position: Winger
- Shot: Left
- Played for: NED Hockey Nymburk; Medicine Hat Tigers; HC Sparta Praha; HC Slovan Ústí nad Labem; HC Berounští Medvědi; HC Mladá Boleslav; HC Energie Karlovy Vary; HC CSKA Moscow; Lev Poprad; Växjö Lakers HC; Bílí Tygři Liberec; HC Neftekhimik Nizhnekamsk; HC Slovan Bratislava; HC Oceláři Třinec; Medvescak Zagreb; HC Kosice; HC Innsbruck; Kopla
- Playing career: 1999–2020

Tomáš Netík is a Czech professional ice hockey player who currently plays for the HC Slovan Bratislava in the Kontinental Hockey League.

== Career statistics ==
			Regular season					Playoffs
Season	Team	League	GP	G	A	Pts	PIM	GP	G	A	Pts	PIM
1999–00	HC Sparta Praha U20	Czech U20	43	10	14	24	16	—	—	—	—	—
1999–00	NED Hockey Nymburk	Czech3	1	0	0	0	0	—	—	—	—	—
2000–01	Medicine Hat Tigers	WHL	3	0	0	0	2	—	—	—	—	—
2000–01	HC Sparta Praha U20	Czech U20	28	32	16	48	36	2	0	0	0	12
2000–01	HC Sparta Praha	Czech	6	0	0	0	0	—	—	—	—	—
2000–01	HC Slovan Ústí nad Labem	Czech2	—	—	—	—	—	—	—	—	—	—
2001–02	HC Sparta Praha U20	Czech U20	17	16	13	29	34	6	2	2	4	0
2001–02	HC Sparta Praha	Czech	14	0	0	0	0	—	—	—	—	—
2001–02	HC Berounští Medvědi	Czech2	3	0	0	0	0	—	—	—	—	—
2001–02	HC Slovan Ústí nad Labem	Czech2	6	1	1	2	2	—	—	—	—	—
2001–02	HC Mladá Boleslav	Czech3	—	—	—	—	—	3	0	1	1	27
2002–03	HC Slovan Ústečtí Lvi	Czech2	40	13	15	28	22	5	0	6	6	31
2003–04	HC Energie Karlovy Vary	Czech	47	10	7	17	20	—	—	—	—	—
2003–04	HC Slovan Ústečtí Lvi	Czech2	8	4	5	9	6	1	0	0	0	0
2004–05	HC Sparta Praha	Czech	46	7	14	21	26	3	0	0	0	12
2005–06	HC Sparta Praha	Czech	49	12	14	26	42	17	2	0	2	8
2006–07	HC Sparta Praha	Czech	50	22	6	28	52	16	5	3	8	30
2007–08	HC Sparta Praha	Czech	49	15	22	37	64	4	0	0	0	6
2008–09	HC Sparta Praha	Czech	41	12	11	23	60	11	3	7	10	2
2009–10	HC Sparta Praha	Czech	43	22	20	42	81	7	3	1	4	36
2010–11	HC CSKA Moscow	KHL	32	4	4	8	24	—	—	—	—	—
2011–12	Lev Poprad	KHL	42	17	11	28	26	—	—	—	—	—
2011–12	Växjö Lakers HC	Elitserien	12	1	1	2	2	—	—	—	—	—
2012–13	Bílí Tygři Liberec	Czech	7	3	3	6	8	—	—	—	—	—
2012–13	HC Neftekhimik Nizhnekamsk	KHL	38	13	8	21	20	4	1	0	1	2
2013–14	HC Slovan Bratislava	KHL	32	11	3	14	12	—	—	—	—	—
2013–14	HC Neftekhimik Nizhnekamsk	KHL	16	1	2	3	6	—	—	—	—	—
2014–15	HC Slovan Bratislava	KHL	56	11	13	24	28	—	—	—	—	—
2015–16	HC Sparta Praha	Czech	41	8	14	22	32	16	0	2	2	6
2016–17	HC Sparta Praha	Czech	20	3	4	7	12	—	—	—	—	—
2016–17	HC Oceláři Třinec	Czech	9	2	0	2	4	6	1	2	3	4
2017–18	Medvescak Zagreb	EBEL	49	15	30	45	22	6	1	2	3	2
2018–19	HC Kosice	Slovak	30	6	18	24	4	—	—	—	—	—
2018–19	HC Innsbruck	EBEL	12	0	2	2	6	—	—	—	—	—
2019–20	Kopla	2. Divisioona	3	4	1	5	0	3	1	6	7	0
KHL totals			216	57	41	98	116	4	1	0	1	2
Czech totals			422	116	115	231	401	80	14	15	29	104
