= Aleš Ježek =

Czech ice hockey player

- Born: June 25, 1990 (age 34); Tábor, Czechoslovakia
- Height: 6 ft 1 in (185 cm)
- Weight: 190 lb (86 kg; 13 st 8 lb)
- Position: Forward
- Shoots: Left
- Polska Hokej Liga team Former teams: KS Cracovia; HC České Budějovice; HC Lev Poprad; HC Almaty; MsHK Žilina; HK Poprad; TH Unia Oświęcim
- Playing career: 2010–present

Aleš Ježek (born June 25, 1990) is a Czech professional ice hockey player. He currently plays with KS Cracovia of the Polska Hokej Liga.

Ježek previously played 12 games in the Czech Extraliga for HC České Budějovice and 13 games in the Kontinental Hockey League for HC Lev Poprad.
