= Tomáš Klouček =

Czech ice hockey player (1980–2025)

- Born: 7 March 1980 Prague, Czechoslovakia
- Died: 16 March 2025 (aged 45) Špindlerův Mlýn, Czech Republic
- Height: 6 ft 3 in (191 cm)
- Weight: 212 lb (96 kg; 15 st 2 lb)
- Position: Defence
- Shot: Left
- Played for: New York Rangers; Nashville Predators; Atlanta Thrashers; HC Bílí Tygři Liberec; HC Zlín; Barys Astana; HC Lev Poprad; HC Oceláři Třinec; HC Košice; Orli Znojmo; HC Kladno; Gamyo d'Épinal
- NHL draft: 131st overall, 1998; New York Rangers
- Playing career: 1999–2016

Tomáš Klouček (7 March 1980 – 16 March 2025) was a Czech professional ice hockey defenceman who played in the National Hockey League for the New York Rangers, Nashville Predators, and the Atlanta Thrashers between 2000 and 2006.

== Playing career ==
He was drafted 131st overall by the Rangers in the 1998 NHL entry draft.

Klouček joined Orli Znojmo in the Erste Bank Eishockey Liga after previously playing in the Slovak Extraliga with HC Kosice. He signed an initial one-month contract with the club on the eve of the 2014–15 season on September 11, 2014.

== Death ==
Klouček died in a skiing accident on 16 March 2025, at the age of 45.

== Career statistics ==
=== Regular season and playoffs ===
			Regular season					Playoffs
Season	Team	League	GP	G	A	Pts	PIM	GP	G	A	Pts	PIM
1995–96	Slavia Praha U20	Czech U20	40	2	8	10	—	—	—	—	—	—
1996–97	Slavia Praha U20	Czech U20	43	4	14	18	44	—	—	—	—	—
1997–98	Slavia Praha U20	Czech U20	43	1	9	10	—	—	—	—	—	—
1998–99	Cape Breton Screaming Eagles	QMJHL	59	4	17	21	162	2	0	0	0	4
1999–00	Hartford Wolf Pack	AHL	73	2	8	10	113	23	0	4	4	18
2000–01	New York Rangers	NHL	43	1	4	5	74	—	—	—	—	—
2000–01	Hartford Wolf Pack	AHL	21	0	2	2	44	—	—	—	—	—
2001–02	New York Rangers	NHL	52	1	3	4	137	—	—	—	—	—
2001–02	Hartford Wolf Pack	AHL	9	0	2	2	27	10	1	1	2	8
2002–03	Hartford Wolf Pack	AHL	20	3	4	7	102	—	—	—	—	—
2002–03	Nashville Predators	NHL	3	0	0	0	2	—	—	—	—	—
2002–03	Milwaukee Admirals	AHL	34	0	6	6	80	—	—	—	—	—
2003–04	Nashville Predators	NHL	5	0	1	1	10	—	—	—	—	—
2003–04	Atlanta Thrashers	NHL	37	0	0	0	25	—	—	—	—	—
2004–05	Bílí Tygři Liberec	CZE	48	3	3	6	64	9	0	1	1	35
2005–06	Atlanta Thrashers	NHL	1	0	0	0	2	—	—	—	—	—
2005–06	Chicago Wolves	AHL	33	0	1	1	94	—	—	—	—	—
2006–07	Syracuse Crunch	AHL	68	2	9	11	133	—	—	—	—	—
2007–08	RI Okna Zlín	CZE	30	2	1	3	142	—	—	—	—	—
2008–09	Barys Astana	KHL	47	5	18	23	222	3	0	1	1	16
2009–10	Barys Astana	KHL	35	1	7	8	44	3	0	1	1	4
2010–11	Barys Astana	KHL	17	1	1	2	65	3	0	0	0	6
2011–12	Lev Poprad	KHL	20	0	0	0	18	—	—	—	—	—
2011–12	Oceláři Třinec	CZE	15	2	3	5	8	5	0	1	1	35
2012–13	Oceláři Třinec	CZE	48	1	5	6	48	11	0	2	2	16
2013–14	HC Košice	SVK	35	1	6	7	81	17	0	3	3	24
2014–15	Orli Znojmo	EBEL	4	0	0	0	12	—	—	—	—	—
2014–15	Rytíři Kladno	CZE-2	23	2	4	6	71	7	0	0	0	12
2015–16	Dauphins d'Épinal	FRA	23	3	6	9	59	12	0	5	5	49
2016–17	Dauphins d'Épinal	FRA	31	4	10	14	137	1	0	0	0	0
KHL totals			119	7	26	33	349	9	0	2	2	26
NHL totals			141	2	8	10	250	—	—	—	—	—
