= Jaroslav Kristek =

Czech ice hockey player

- Born: March 16, 1980 (age 46) Gottwaldov, Czechoslovakia
- Height: 6 ft 0 in (183 cm)
- Weight: 183 lb (83 kg; 13 st 1 lb)
- Position: Right Wing
- Shoots: Left
- CZE-4 team Former teams: HC Brumov-Bylnice; GKS Tychy; Neman Grodno; MsHK Žilina; Dinamo Minsk; Lev Poprad; HC Košice; HC Zlín; HC Energie Karlovy Vary; HC České Budějovice; Buffalo Sabres
- NHL draft: 50th overall, 1998; Buffalo Sabres
- Playing career: 2000–present

Jaroslav Kristek (born March 16, 1980) is a Czech professional ice hockey right winger currently playing for HC Brumov-Bylnice in the Czech fourth division. He was drafted in the second round, 50th overall, by the Buffalo Sabres in the 1998 NHL entry draft and played 6 games for them during the 2002–03 season. The rest of his career has been spent in various European leagues, mainly the Czech Extraliga. He won a Slovnaft Extraliga championship with HC Košice in 2010–11.

Kristek played two seasons in the Western Hockey League with the Tri-City Americans before joining the Sabres' American Hockey League affiliate, the Rochester Americans, for the 2000–01 season. In three seasons with Rochester, Kristek appeared in 125 games and scored 23 goals. He also appeared in six NHL games with Buffalo during the 2002–03 season, recording no points.

Kristek returned to his native Czech Republic in 2003, initially signing with HC Sparta Praha on May 7 but transferring to HC České Budějovice a few months later without playing any games for Sparta. He later moved on to play in Slovakia.

== Career statistics ==
=== Regular season and playoffs ===
			Regular season					Playoffs
Season	Team	League	GP	G	A	Pts	PIM	GP	G	A	Pts	PIM
1995–96	HC Zlín U18	CZE U18	10	13	10	23	—	—	—	—	—	—
1995–96	HC Zlín U20	CZE U20	34	33	20	53	—	—	—	—	—	—
1996–97	HC Zlín U20	CZE U20	44	28	27	55	—	—	—	—	—	—
1997–98	HC Zlín U20	CZE U20	7	8	5	13	—	—	—	—	—	—
1997–98	HC Zlín	CZE	38	2	7	9	18	—	—	—	—	—
1997–98	HK Prostějov	CZE-2	4	0	0	0	0	—	—	—	—	—
1998–99	Tri-City Americans	WHL	70	38	48	86	55	12	4	3	7	2
1999–00	Tri-City Americans	WHL	45	26	25	51	16	2	0	0	0	0
2000–01	Rochester Americans	AHL	35	5	3	8	20	—	—	—	—	—
2001–02	Rochester Americans	AHL	43	3	6	9	20	1	0	0	0	0
2002–03	Buffalo Sabres	NHL	6	0	0	0	4	—	—	—	—	—
2002–03	Rochester Americans	AHL	47	15	17	32	24	—	—	—	—	—
2003–04	HC České Budějovice	CZE	52	12	14	26	24	—	—	—	—	—
2004–05	HC Zlín	CZE	45	5	10	15	14	16	2	2	4	6
2005–06	HC Zlín	CZE	52	11	6	17	38	6	0	0	0	2
2006–07	HC Zlín	CZE	26	3	5	8	10	—	—	—	—	—
2006–07	HC Energie Karlovy Vary	CZE	13	5	2	7	12	3	0	0	0	10
2007–08	HC Energie Karlovy Vary	CZE	51	6	9	15	28	19	10	2	12	2
2008–09	HC Energie Karlovy Vary	CZE	47	15	11	26	22	13	2	2	4	4
2009–10	HC Energie Karlovy Vary	CZE	44	8	10	18	14	—	—	—	—	—
2009–10	HC Zlín	CZE	8	2	4	6	12	6	1	4	5	4
2010–11	HC Košice	SVK	55	14	32	46	38	14	5	8	13	22
2011–12	Lev Poprad	KHL	39	10	6	16	14	—	—	—	—	—
2011–12	HC Košice	SVK	11	1	1	2	6	12	7	3	10	2
2012–13	Neman Grodno	BLR	42	21	33	54	44	12	6	6	12	4
2013–14	Neman Grodno	BLR	39	12	24	36	20	14	7	6	13	10
2013–14	Dinamo Minsk	KHL	8	0	1	1	8	—	—	—	—	—
2014–15	MsHK Žilina	SVK	27	8	15	23	16	—	—	—	—	—
2014–15	Neman Grodno	BLR	19	7	6	13	22	9	2	6	8	2
2015–16	Eispiraten Crimmitschau	DEL2	2	0	1	1	2	—	—	—	—	—
2015–16	Neman Grodno	BLR	21	7	7	14	16	12	2	3	5	8
2016–17	GKS Tychy	POL	35	14	15	29	!8	8	4	1	5	4
2017–18	Brest	FRA-2	22	7	12	19	4	14	5	7	12	2
2018–19	Courchevel Méribel Pralognan	FRA-3	18	24	32	56	6	2	2	3	5	4
2019–20	Courchevel Méribel Pralognan	FRA-3	6	3	6	9	4	—	—	—	—	—
2021–22	HC Brumov-Bylnice	CZE-4	12	10	20	30	8	—	—	—	—	—
CZE totals			376	69	78	147	192	63	15	10	25	28
NHL totals			6	0	0	0	4	—	—	—	—	—

=== International ===
Year	Team	Event	GP	G	A	Pts	PIM
1998	Czech Republic	EJC	6	4	2	6	8
2000	Czech Republic	WJC	7	5	1	6	2
Junior totals			13	9	3	12	10
