= Emil Lundberg =

Swedish ice hockey player

- Born: January 11, 1982 (age 44) Luleå, Sweden
- Height: 5 ft 10 in (178 cm)
- Weight: 190 lb (86 kg; 13 st 8 lb)
- Position: Centre
- Shot: Left
- Played for: Luleå HF; SaiPa; HPK; HK SKP Poprad; HC Lev Poprad; Kloten Flyers; Brynäs IF
- Playing career: 2000–2018

Emil Lundberg (born January 11, 1982) is a Swedish former professional ice hockey centre. He last played for AIK IF in the Swedish HockeyAllsvenskan (Allsv).

He played for Luleå HF and Brynäs IF in the Swedish Hockey League and HK ŠKP Poprad in the Slovak Extraliga. Lundberg previously trialled with KHL Medveščak Zagreb of the Kontinental Hockey League.

== Career statistics ==
			Regular season					Playoffs
Season	Team	League	GP	G	A	Pts	PIM	GP	G	A	Pts	PIM
1999–00	Luleå HF J18	J18 Allsvenskan	4	1	0	1	10	—	—	—	—	—
2000–01	Luleå HF J20	J20 SuperElit	19	4	8	12	22	3	3	2	5	0
2000–01	Luleå HF	SHL	—	—	—	—	—	1	0	0	0	0
2001–02	Luleå HF J20	J20 SuperElit	30	8	13	21	26	2	0	1	1	0
2001–02	Luleå HF	SHL	9	0	0	0	0	6	0	1	1	0
2002–03	Luleå HF J20	J20 SuperElit	8	1	3	4	8	—	—	—	—	—
2002–03	Luleå HF	SHL	47	1	2	3	8	4	0	0	0	0
2003–04	Luleå HF	SHL	38	3	3	6	12	5	1	0	1	0
2004–05	Luleå HF	SHL	50	5	6	11	26	4	0	1	1	2
2005–06	Luleå HF	SHL	39	3	4	7	34	6	0	0	0	6
2006–07	SaiPa	Liiga	56	12	18	30	89	—	—	—	—	—
2007–08	HPK	Liiga	37	8	12	20	26	—	—	—	—	—
2007–08	Luleå HF	SHL	7	0	3	3	8	—	—	—	—	—
2008–09	Luleå HF	SHL	55	6	4	10	34	5	0	1	1	0
2009–10	Luleå HF	SHL	48	5	5	10	10	—	—	—	—	—
2010–11	HK Poprad	Slovak	53	20	13	33	59	18	4	6	10	16
2011–12	HC Lev Poprad	KHL	54	10	6	16	26	—	—	—	—	—
2012–13	Kloten Flyers	NLA	33	6	4	10	14	—	—	—	—	—
2013–14	Mora IK	Allsvenskan	35	8	12	20	34	—	—	—	—	—
2014–15	Almtuna IS	Allsvenskan	27	4	9	13	20	—	—	—	—	—
2014–15	Brynäs IF	SHL	11	0	0	0	4	—	—	—	—	—
2014–15	AIK IF	Allsvenskan	12	3	2	5	4	9	1	6	7	8
2015–16	AIK IF	Allsvenskan	51	9	9	18	38	—	—	—	—	—
2016–17	AIK IF	Allsvenskan	52	4	12	16	30	—	—	—	—	—
2017–18	AIK IF	Allsvenskan	43	1	5	6	14	—	—	—	—	—
SHL totals			304	23	27	50	136	31	1	3	4	8
