= Juraj Mikúš (ice hockey, born 1987) =

Slovak professional ice hockey centre (born 1987)

- Born: 22 February 1987 (age 39) Skalica, Czechoslovakia
- Height: 6 ft 1 in (185 cm)
- Weight: 185 lb (84 kg; 13 st 3 lb)
- Position: Centre
- Shoots: Right
- team Former teams: Free agent HK 36 Skalica; Dinamo Riga; HC Spartak Moscow; HC Lev Poprad; HC TPS; HC Lev Praha; HC Slovan Bratislava; HC Olomouc; HC Litvínov; HKM Zvolen; HC Nové Zámky; HK Dukla Trenčín
- National team: Slovakia
- NHL draft: 121st overall, 2005; Montreal Canadiens
- Playing career: 2003–present

Juraj Mikúš (born 22 February 1987) is a Slovak professional ice hockey centre who most recently played for HK Dukla Trenčín of the Slovak Extraliga. He was selected in the fourth round, 121st overall, by the Montreal Canadiens in the 2005 NHL entry draft.

== Playing career ==
Mikúš was drafted by Kontinental Hockey League (KHL) club Spartak Moscow, 60th overall, in the 2009 KHL Junior Draft. Due to the team having more than the permitted number of foreign players, he signed for Dinamo Riga of the same league in 2010. After playing 22 games for Riga, Mikúš returned to Spartak Moscow after two over their overseas players - Martin Cibak and Jaroslav Obsut- had left, putting the side under the foreign player quota. He played 23 games for Moscow, as well as four in the playoffs before leaving after the 2010–11 season. Mikúš then signed for KHL side Lev Poprad, based in Slovakia, in August 2011.

He split the 2017–18 season between HC Slovan Bratislava and HC Litvínov in the Czech Extraliga. He scored a goal on his Extraliga debut for Litvínov in a 4–1 loss against HC Sparta Praha in January 2018. After the season, Mikúš opted to extend his tenure in the ELH, agreeing to a three-year optional contract with Litvínov on 18 May 2018.

== Personal life ==
Outside of his playing career, Mikúš is also active at various levels of politics, serving as a local councillor in Skalica and failed to run for parliament in 2023 on the KDH party list. He also ran for the 2024 European Parliament election in Slovakia.

== Career statistics ==
=== Regular season and playoffs ===
Bold indicates led league

			Regular season					Playoffs
Season	Team	League	GP	G	A	Pts	PIM	GP	G	A	Pts	PIM
2003–04	HK 36 Skalica	SVK U18	34	18	17	35	26	9	10	5	15	12
2003–04	HK 36 Skalica	SVK U20	8	3	7	10	16	—	—	—	—	—
2003–04	HK 36 Skalica	Slovak	2	1	0	1	0	4	0	0	0	0
2004–05	HK 36 Skalica	SVK U18	3	1	7	8	2	—	—	—	—	—
2004–05	HK 36 Skalica	SVK U20	30	17	18	35	40	6	5	3	8	10
2004–05	HK 36 Skalica	Slovak	46	6	6	12	16	—	—	—	—	—
2005–06	HK 36 Skalica	SVK U20	4	1	0	1	2	2	1	2	3	2
2005–06	HK 36 Skalica	Slovak	47	4	7	11	56	7	2	1	3	14
2006–07	Chicoutimi Saguenéens	QMJHL	60	29	42	71	36	4	1	1	2	4
2007–08	HK 36 Skalica	Slovak	54	21	22	43	52	13	8	5	13	36
2007–08	HC ’05 Banská Bystrica	Slovak.1	—	—	—	—	—	2	1	3	4	0
2008–09	HK 36 Skalica	Slovak	56	31	**59**	90	52	17	7	**16**	23	18
2009–10	Manchester Monarchs	AHL	56	4	9	13	31	—	—	—	—	—
2010–11	Dinamo Rīga	KHL	22	3	1	4	12	—	—	—	—	—
2010–11	Spartak Moscow	KHL	23	2	3	5	14	4	0	0	0	6
2011–12	Lev Poprad	KHL	44	12	16	28	46	—	—	—	—	—
2011–12	TPS	SM-l	17	5	5	10	0	2	0	1	1	0
2012–13	HC Lev Praha	KHL	27	4	8	12	18	—	—	—	—	—
2012–13	HC Slovan Bratislava	KHL	4	2	2	4	8	4	0	1	1	4
2013–14	HC Slovan Bratislava	KHL	47	7	8	15	28	—	—	—	—	—
2014–15	Did not play
2015–16	Did not play
2016–17	HC Olomouc	ELH	33	9	13	22	46	—	—	—	—	—
2017–18	HC Slovan Bratislava	KHL	49	7	6	13	22	—	—	—	—	—
2017–18	HC Verva Litvínov	ELH	9	4	7	11	4	—	—	—	—	—
2018–19	HC Verva Litvínov	ELH	44	11	13	24	34	—	—	—	—	—
2019–20	HC Verva Litvínov	ELH	25	3	5	8	16	—	—	—	—	—
2019–20	HKm Zvolen	Slovak	14	6	4	10	8	—	—	—	—	—
2020–21	HKm Zvolen	Slovak	46	17	25	42	26	14	3	4	7	29
2021–22	HKm Zvolen	Slovak	50	9	22	31	30	11	3	0	3	8
Slovak totals			315	95	145	240	240	66	23	26	49	105
KHL totals			216	37	43	80	148	8	0	1	1	10
ELH totals			111	27	38	65	100	—	—	—	—	—

Medal record

Ice hockey

Representing Slovakia

World Championships
Silver medal – second place	2012 Finland/Sweden	

=== International ===
Year	Team	Event	Result	GP	G	A	Pts	PIM
2005	Slovakia	WJC18	6th	6	0	7	7	12
2006	Slovakia	WJC	8th	6	0	0	0	6
2007	Slovakia	WJC	8th	6	5	1	6	0
2008	Slovakia	WC	13th	2	0	0	0	0
2009	Slovakia	WC	10th	6	0	1	1	2
2012	Slovakia	WC	2nd place, silver medalist(s)	10	1	3	4	4
2014	Slovakia	WC	9th	7	1	2	3	8
2018	Slovakia	WC	9th	2	0	0	0	0
Junior totals				18	5	8	13	18
Senior totals				27	2	6	8	14

== Awards and honors ==
Award	Year	Ref
Slovakia
Champion	2021	
