= Branislav Mezei =

Slovak ice hockey player (born 1980)

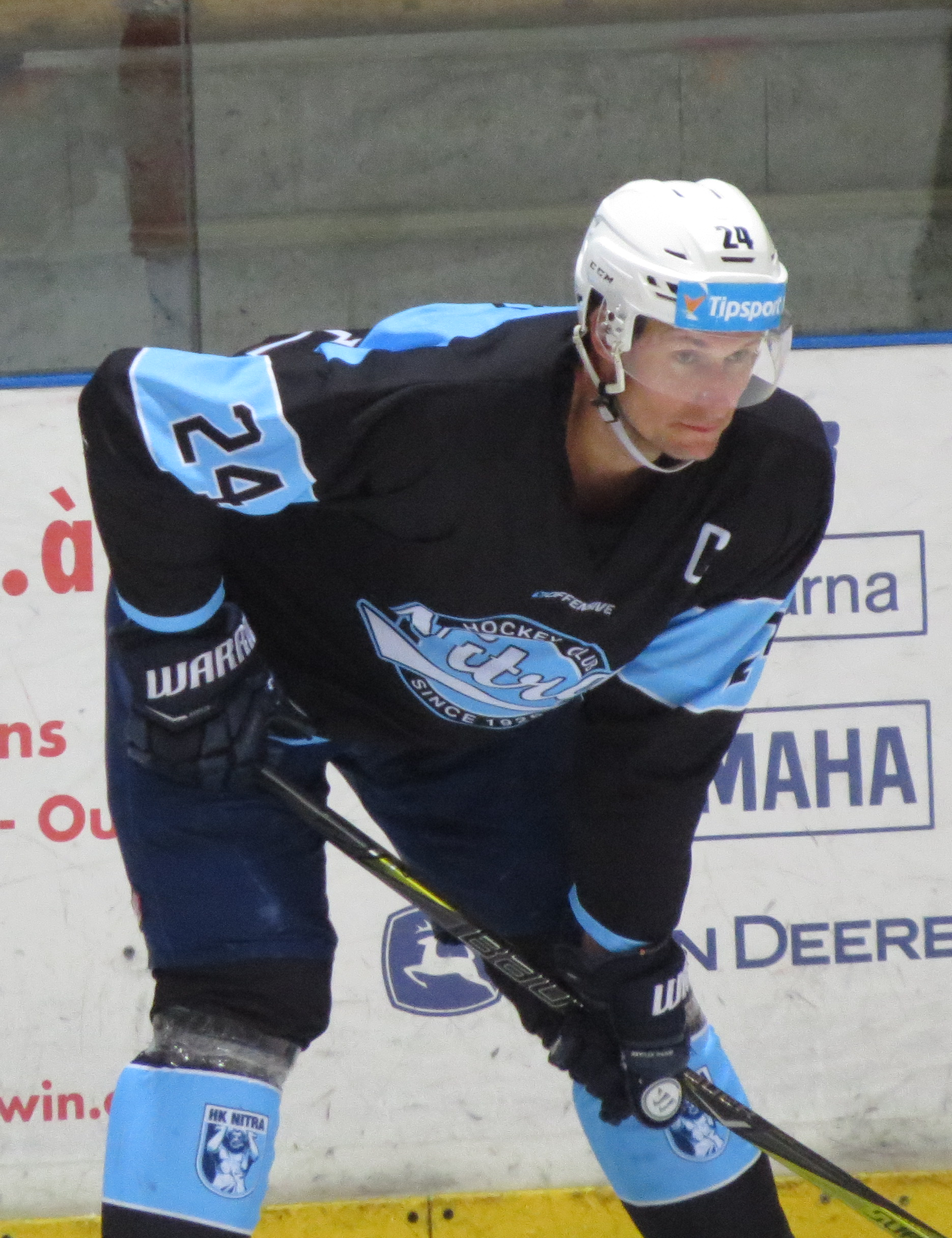
- Born: October 8, 1980 (age 45) Nitra, Czechoslovakia
- Height: 6 ft 5 in (196 cm)
- Weight: 236 lb (107 kg; 16 st 12 lb)
- Position: Defence
- Shoots: Left
- Slovak team Former teams: HK Nitra; New York Islanders; Florida Panthers; HC Oceláři Třinec; HK Dukla Trenčín; Barys Astana; HC Plzen; Espoo Blues; HC Pardubice; Lev Poprad; Avtomobilist Yekaterinburg; HC Vityaz Podolsk; KHL Medveščak Zagreb
- National team: Slovakia
- NHL draft: 10th overall, 1999; New York Islanders
- Playing career: 2000–present

Branislav Mezei (born October 8, 1980) is a Slovak professional ice hockey player. Mezei is a defenceman currently with HK Nitra of the Slovak Extraliga. Mezei has previous played in the National Hockey League (NHL) with the New York Islanders and Florida Panthers. Mezei also played for Barys Astana and HC Plzen of the KHL, and Espoo Blues of the SM-liiga. Mezei was a first-round pick of the Islanders in the 1999 NHL entry draft, tenth overall.

== Playing career ==
Mezei moved to Canada to play junior hockey with the Belleville Bulls of the Ontario Hockey League. Mezei played three seasons with the Bulls from 1997 until 2000. After his second season, he was drafted tenth-overall by the New York Islanders. He joined the Islanders organization in 2000. Mezei played two seasons in the Islanders organization, including 66 games with the Islanders. He recorded his first NHL assist against the Columbus Blue Jackets on December 23, 2000, and he scored his first NHL goal on March 31, 2001, against the Boston Bruins. In July 2002, he was traded to the Florida Panthers. He was a member of the Panthers from 2002 until 2008, playing a further 178 games primarily in a defensive role. He tallied 5 goals and 19 assists in his NHL career.

During the 2004–05 lockout, Mezei played for Trinec Ocelari HC and HK Dukla Trenčín. In 2008, Mezei moved to Europe to play with Barys Astana of the KHL. He has since played for Espoo Blues, HC Plzen, HC Pardubice and Lev Poprad.

On August 31, 2014, Mezei remained in the KHL, signing with his fourth club, the Croatian based KHL Medveščak Zagreb on a one-year deal. After just 8 games with the Croatian club, Mezei was released mutually from his contract in order to return to his native Slovakia with HK Nitra on October 24, 2014.

== International play ==
He has also played with the Slovak national ice hockey team in Ice Hockey World Championships in 2001, 2004 and 2008.

== Career statistics ==
=== Regular season and playoffs ===
			Regular season					Playoffs
Season	Team	League	GP	G	A	Pts	PIM	GP	G	A	Pts	PIM
1995–96	AC/HC Nitra	SVK U20	45	5	10	15	86	—	—	—	—	—
1996–97	AC/HC Nitra	SVK U20	52	7	22	29	114	—	—	—	—	—
1997–98	Belleville Bulls	OHL	53	3	5	8	58	8	0	2	2	8
1998–99	Belleville Bulls	OHL	60	5	18	23	90	18	0	4	4	29
1999–2000	Belleville Bulls	OHL	58	7	21	28	99	6	0	3	3	10
2000–01	New York Islanders	NHL	42	1	4	5	53	—	—	—	—	—
2000–01	Lowell Lock Monsters	AHL	20	0	3	3	28	—	—	—	—	—
2001–02	Bridgeport Sound Tigers	AHL	59	1	9	10	137	20	0	1	1	48
2001–02	New York Islanders	NHL	24	0	2	2	12	—	—	—	—	—
2002–03	Florida Panthers	NHL	11	2	0	2	10	—	—	—	—	—
2002–03	San Antonio Rampage	AHL	1	0	0	0	0	3	0	0	0	0
2003–04	Florida Panthers	NHL	45	0	7	7	80	—	—	—	—	—
2004–05	HC Oceláři Třinec	ELH	41	1	2	3	68	—	—	—	—	—
2004–05	HK Dukla Trenčín	SVK	10	1	1	2	16	12	1	2	3	38
2005–06	Florida Panthers	NHL	16	0	1	1	37	—	—	—	—	—
2006–07	Florida Panthers	NHL	45	0	3	3	55	—	—	—	—	—
2007–08	Florida Panthers	NHL	57	2	2	4	64	—	—	—	—	—
2008–09	Barys Astana	KHL	56	5	5	10	151	3	0	1	1	6
2009–10	HC Plzeň 1929	ELH	19	0	0	0	61	—	—	—	—	—
2009–10	Espoo Blues	SM-l	38	0	4	4	120	3	1	2	3	4
2010–11	HC Eaton Pardubice	ELH	51	6	9	15	118	9	0	1	1	16
2011–12	HC Lev Poprad	KHL	53	3	11	14	117	—	—	—	—	—
2012–13	Avtomobilist Yekaterinburg	KHL	51	8	13	21	89	—	—	—	—	—
2013–14	HC Vityaz	KHL	47	4	4	8	108	—	—	—	—	—
2014–15	KHL Medveščak Zagreb	KHL	8	0	0	0	14	—	—	—	—	—
2014–15	HK Nitra	SVK	40	4	10	14	65	12	0	2	2	27
2015–16	HK Nitra	SVK	43	4	7	11	54	16	2	1	3	37
2016–17	HK Nitra	SVK	56	5	25	30	83	13	3	4	7	37
2017–18	HK Nitra	SVK	51	5	23	28	112	8	3	7	10	14
2018–19	HK Nitra	SVK	57	1	12	13	77	18	1	3	4	26
2019–20	HK Nitra	SVK	55	3	9	12	68	—	—	—	—	—
NHL totals			240	5	19	24	311	—	—	—	—	—
KHL totals			215	20	33	53	479	3	0	1	1	6
SVK totals			312	23	87	110	475	79	10	19	29	179

=== International ===
Medal record

Representing Slovakia

Ice hockey

World Junior Championships
Bronze medal – third place	1999 Manitoba	

Year	Team	Event	Result	GP	G	A	Pts	PIM
1999	Slovakia	WJC	3rd place, bronze medalist(s)	6	0	0	0	8
2000	Slovakia	WJC	9th	7	1	0	1	6
2001	Slovakia	WC	7th	6	0	0	0	2
2004	Slovakia	WCH	7th	2	0	0	0	0
2004	Slovakia	WC	4th	9	0	0	0	6
2008	Slovakia	WC	13th	5	0	0	0	8
2013	Slovakia	WC	8th	7	0	4	4	6
Junior totals				13	1	0	1	14
Senior totals				29	0	4	4	22

Awards and achievements
Preceded by Taylor Pyatt	New York Islanders first-round draft pick 1999	Succeeded by Kristian Kudroc
