= Jiří Sekáč =

Czech ice hockey player (born 1992)

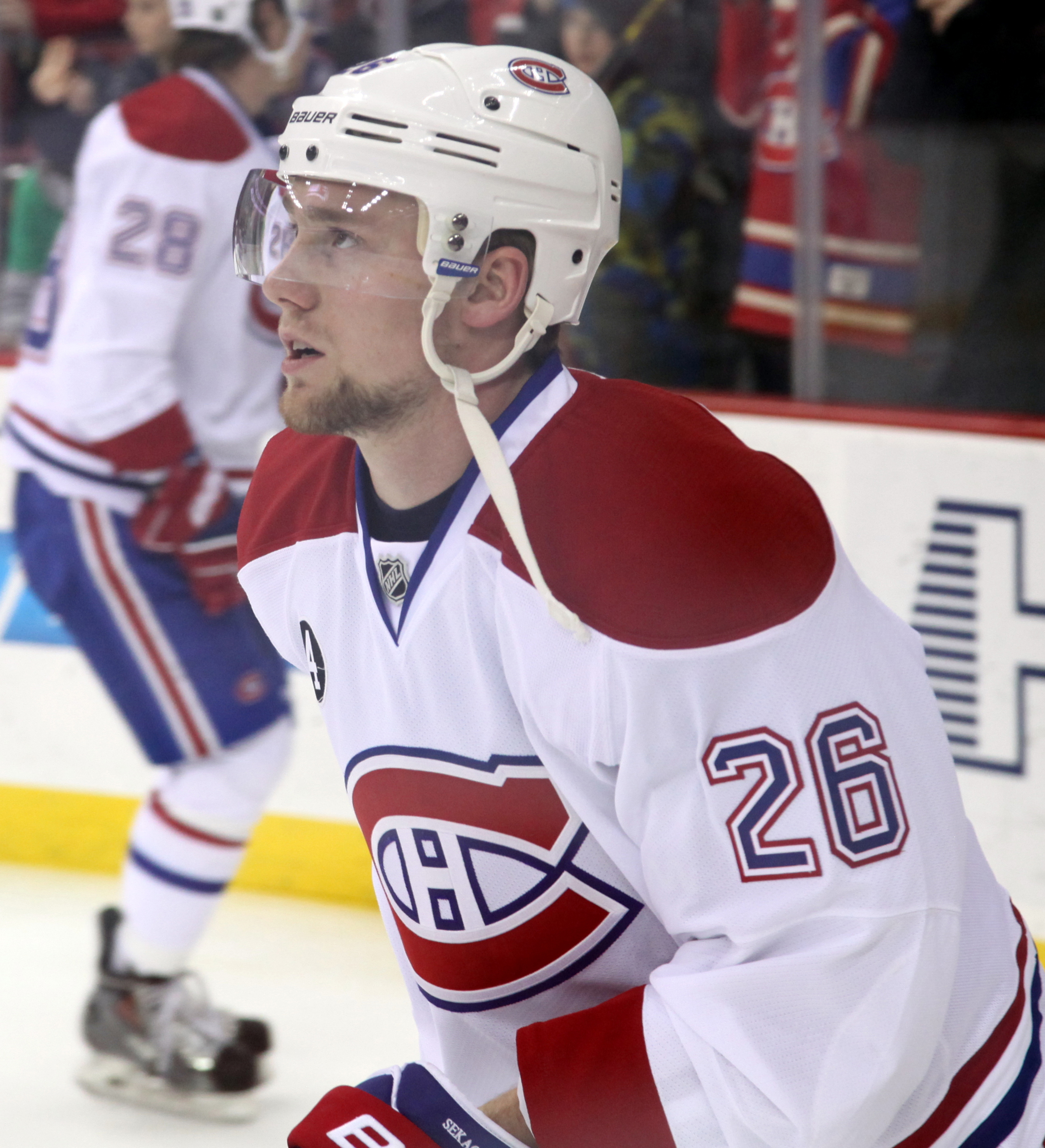
- Sekáč with the Montreal Canadiens in January 2015
- Born: 10 June 1992 (age 34) Aš, Czechoslovakia
- Height: 6 ft 1 in (185 cm)
- Weight: 185 lb (84 kg; 13 st 3 lb)
- Position: Left wing
- Shoots: Left
- ELH team Former teams: HC Sparta Praha; HC Lev Poprad; HC Sparta Praha; HC Lev Praha; Montreal Canadiens; Anaheim Ducks; Chicago Blackhawks; Arizona Coyotes; Ak Bars Kazan; HC CSKA Moscow; Avangard Omsk; Lausanne HC; HC Lugano
- National team: Czech Republic
- NHL draft: Undrafted
- Playing career: 2011–present

Jiří Sekáč (born 10 June 1992) is a Czech professional ice hockey player for HC Sparta Praha of the Czech Extraliga (ELH). Originally undrafted by teams in the National Hockey League (NHL), Sekáč has previously played for the Montreal Canadiens, Anaheim Ducks, Chicago Blackhawks, and Arizona Coyotes.

== Playing career ==
As a youth, Sekáč played in the 2005 Quebec International Pee-Wee Hockey Tournament with a team from Chomutov.

Sekáč later played with HC Lev Praha in the Kontinental Hockey League and HC Sparta Praha in the Czech Extraliga. On 1 July 2014 Sekáč signed a two-year entry-level contract with the Canadiens worth $1,850,000. In his first North American season in 2014–15 he scored his first NHL goal on 16 October 2014 against Tuukka Rask of the Boston Bruins.

On 13 January 2015 Sekáč was invited to the 2015 Honda NHL All-Star Skills Competition as a replacement for Los Angeles Kings' forward Tanner Pearson. Known for his skating speed, he was drafted by Team Foligno, along with Canadiens' teammate Carey Price, and participated in the Bridgestone NHL Fastest Skater race, beating Aaron Ekblad with a time of 13.683s, making him the 6th fastest of the event.

After 50 games with the Canadiens on 24 February 2015 he was traded to the Anaheim Ducks in exchange for Devante Smith-Pelly.

In the following 2015–16 season, Sekáč was unable to secure a regular forward role and appeared in 22 games for 3 points with the Ducks before he was traded to the Chicago Blackhawks in exchange for Ryan Garbutt on 21 January 2016. Sekáč was used sparingly in 6 games with the Blackhawks registering one assist before being placed on waivers and claimed by the Arizona Coyotes on 27 February 2016. Sekac closed out the season with the Coyotes, appearing 11 games for two assists.

On 6 June 2016 Sekáč headed back to Europe and signed a one-year deal with Ak Bars Kazan in a return to the Kontinental Hockey League.

On 1 May 2019, after three productive seasons with Ak Bars, Sekáč was traded to reigning champions HC CSKA Moscow in exchange for Igor Ozhiganov's KHL rights. He registered 25 points in 45 regular season games, before ending his season through injury.

A free agent from CSKA, Sekáč continued his career in the KHL, agreeing to a one-year contract with Avangard Omsk on 16 July 2020.

On 28 July 2021, Sekáč joined Lausanne HC of the National League (NL) on a three-year deal through the end of the 2023–24 season.

== Career statistics ==
=== Regular season and playoffs ===
			Regular season					Playoffs
Season	Team	League	GP	G	A	Pts	PIM	GP	G	A	Pts	PIM
2007–08	HC GEUS OKNA Kladno	CZE U18	45	6	9	15	8	—	—	—	—	—
2008–09	HC GEUS OKNA Kladno	CZE U18	46	38	49	87	48	5	3	3	6	6
2009–10	Peterborough Petes	OHL	8	0	0	0	0	—	—	—	—	—
2009–10	Youngstown Phantoms	USHL	38	2	9	11	35	—	—	—	—	—
2010–11	Youngstown Phantoms	USHL	58	18	27	45	27	—	—	—	—	—
2011–12	Tatranskí Vlci	MHL	6	8	2	10	22	—	—	—	—	—
2011–12	HC Lev Poprad	KHL	36	2	8	10	4	—	—	—	—	—
2012–13	HC Sparta Praha	ELH	21	4	6	10	8	—	—	—	—	—
2012–13	HC Lev Praha	KHL	26	0	1	1	8	3	0	0	0	0
2013–14	HC Lev Praha	KHL	47	11	17	28	18	21	1	7	8	24
2014–15	Montreal Canadiens	NHL	50	7	9	16	18	—	—	—	—	—
2014–15	Anaheim Ducks	NHL	19	2	5	7	4	7	0	0	0	2
2015–16	Anaheim Ducks	NHL	22	1	2	3	4	—	—	—	—	—
2015–16	San Diego Gulls	AHL	1	1	0	1	0	—	—	—	—	—
2015–16	Chicago Blackhawks	NHL	6	0	1	1	2	—	—	—	—	—
2015–16	Arizona Coyotes	NHL	11	0	2	2	10	—	—	—	—	—
2016–17	Ak Bars Kazan	KHL	47	13	14	27	41	15	6	4	10	2
2017–18	Ak Bars Kazan	KHL	50	16	26	42	16	15	4	9	13	2
2018–19	Ak Bars Kazan	KHL	60	23	24	47	16	4	1	0	1	2
2019–20	CSKA Moscow	KHL	45	12	13	25	12	—	—	—	—	—
2020–21	Avangard Omsk	KHL	34	10	11	21	22	6	2	0	2	0
2021–22	Lausanne HC	NL	50	19	27	46	24	8	4	2	6	6
2022–23	Lausanne HC	NL	43	15	17	32	24	—	—	—	—	—
2023–24	Lausanne HC	NL	43	8	17	25	70	19	6	5	11	41
2024–25	HC Lugano	NL	46	10	19	29	59	—	—	—	—	—
2025–26	HC Lugano	NL	39	7	10	17	70	4	0	2	2	2
2026–27	HC Sparta Praha	ELH	3	1	2	3	2	—	—	—	—	—
KHL totals			345	87	114	201	137	64	14	20	34	30
NHL totals			108	10	19	29	38	7	0	0	0	2

=== International ===
Year	Team	Event	Result	GP	G	A	Pts	PIM
2009	Czech Republic	IH18	5th		1
2010	Czech Republic	WJC18	6th	6	4	0	4	2
2012	Czech Republic	WJC	5th	6	0	3	3	2
2014	Czech Republic	WC	4th	10	2	0	2	4
2018	Czech Republic	OG	4th	5	0	1	1	2
2021	Czech Republic	WC	7th	5	0	2	2	2
Junior totals				12	4	3	7	4
Senior totals				20	2	3	5	8

== Awards and honours ==
Award	Year	Ref
KHL
Gagarin Cup champion	2018, 2021	
