= Karel Pilař =

- Born: December 23, 1977 (age 48) Prague, Czechoslovakia
- Height: 6 ft 2 in (188 cm)
- Weight: 206 lb (93 kg; 14 st 10 lb)
- Position: Defence
- Shot: Right
- Played for: HC Litvínov; Toronto Maple Leafs; HC Sparta Praha; Metallurg Magnitogorsk; HC CSKA Moscow; Lev Poprad; Växjö Lakers; HC Donbass; Mountfield HK; Anyang Halla
- National team: Czech Republic
- NHL draft: 39th overall, 2001; Toronto Maple Leafs
- Playing career: 1999–2018

Karel Pilař (born December 23, 1977) is a Czech former professional ice hockey defenceman who played 90 games in the National Hockey League for the Toronto Maple Leafs between 2001 and 2004. The rest of his career, which lasted from 1999 to 2018, was mainly spent in the Czech Extraliga. Internationally he played for the Czech national team at the 2001 World Championship, winning a gold medal.

== Playing career ==
Pilař made his North American hockey debut during the 2001–02 NHL season, playing 52 games for the St. John's Maple Leafs of the AHL and earning himself a promotion to their parent club, the Toronto Maple Leafs, for the remainder of the season.

The following season, Karel's career was jeopardized when a viral infection attacked his heart and sidelined him on two occasions. However, he fought back from his illness to play in 50 games for Toronto in the 2003–04 NHL season.

With the NHL season canceled in 2004–05, Pilař returned home to play in his hometown for HC Sparta Praha, scoring a career-high of 13 goals and helping his club win the Czech Extraliga title.

Unfortunately for Pilař, he suffered a relapse of the heart condition that had plagued him three years earlier, forcing him to miss the majority of the next two seasons. Once healthy, Pilař returned to North American ice 2007, playing the final 10 games of the season with the Toronto Marlies of the AHL.

Seeking an opportunity for an NHL comeback, Pilař signed with the Atlanta Thrashers for the 2007–2008 season. After being claimed by the Chicago Blackhawks from waivers during training camp and re-claimed by the Thrashers, he was assigned to their AHL affiliate, the Chicago Wolves. On January 14, 2009, he left Metallurg Magnitogorsk and returned to the Czech Republic, where he signed a contract to play for Sparta Praha.

Having played for HC Litvínov of the Czech Extraliga as well as HC CSKA Moscow and Lev Poprad of the KHL after that, he signed a half-year contract with the Växjö Lakers of the Swedish Elitserien (SEL) on January 30, 2012.

== Career statistics ==
=== Regular season and playoffs ===
| | | | Regular season | | | | | Playoffs |
| Season | Team | League | GP | G | A | Pts | PIM | GP | G | A | Pts | PIM |
|---|---|---|---|---|---|---|---|---|---|---|---|---|
| 1996–97 | HC Sparta Praha | CZE U20 | 36 | 4 | 8 | 12 | — | — | — | — | — | — |
| 1997–98 | HC Vajgar Jindřichův Hradec | CZE-2 | — | — | — | — | — | — | — | — | — | — |
| 1998–99 | HK Kaučuk Kralupy nad Vltavou | CZE-2 | 47 | 8 | 11 | 19 | 30 | — | — | — | — | — |
| 1999–00 | HC Chemopetrol, a.s. | CZE | 49 | 2 | 12 | 14 | 61 | 7 | 0 | 0 | 0 | 4 |
| 2000–01 | HC Chemopetrol, a.s. | CZE | 52 | 12 | 26 | 38 | 52 | 4 | 1 | 1 | 2 | 25 |
| 2001–02 | Toronto Maple Leafs | NHL | 23 | 1 | 3 | 4 | 8 | 11 | 0 | 4 | 4 | 12 |
| 2001–02 | St. John's Maple Leafs | AHL | 52 | 10 | 14 | 24 | 26 | — | — | — | — | — |
| 2002–03 | Toronto Maple Leafs | NHL | 17 | 3 | 4 | 7 | 12 | — | — | — | — | — |
| 2002–03 | St. John's Maple Leafs | AHL | 7 | 2 | 5 | 7 | 28 | — | — | — | — | — |
| 2003–04 | Toronto Maple Leafs | NHL | 50 | 2 | 17 | 19 | 22 | 1 | 1 | 0 | 1 | 0 |
| 2003–04 | St. John's Maple Leafs | AHL | 6 | 3 | 4 | 7 | 6 | — | — | — | — | — |
| 2004–05 | HC Sparta Praha | CZE | 52 | 13 | 15 | 28 | 70 | — | — | — | — | — |
| 2005–06 | HC Sparta Praha | cZE | 6 | 0 | 1 | 1 | 20 | 14 | 3 | 3 | 6 | 45 |
| 2006–07 | Toronto Marlies | AHL | 10 | 2 | 5 | 7 | 6 | — | — | — | — | — |
| 2006–07 | HC Sparta Praha | CZE | — | — | — | — | — | 1 | 0 | 0 | 0 | 2 |
| 2007–08 | Chicago Wolves | AHL | 45 | 2 | 24 | 26 | 48 | 3 | 0 | 0 | 0 | 6 |
| 2008–09 | Metallurg Magnitogorsk | KHL | 24 | 1 | 5 | 6 | 22 | — | — | — | — | — |
| 2008–09 | HC Sparta Praha | cZE | 13 | 2 | 3 | 5 | 32 | 11 | 0 | 3 | 3 | 50 |
| 2009–10 | HC BENZINA Litvínov | CZE | 37 | 6 | 19 | 25 | 79 | 4 | 0 | 1 | 1 | 16 |
| 2010–11 | CSKA Moscow | KHL | 42 | 3 | 2 | 5 | 28 | — | — | — | — | — |
| 2011–12 | HC Lev Poprad | CZE | 31 | 1 | 16 | 17 | 34 | — | — | — | — | — |
| 2011–12 | Växjö Lakers | SEL | 13 | 0 | 4 | 4 | 6 | — | — | — | — | — |
| 2012–13 | HC Donbass | KHL | 17 | 0 | 2 | 2 | 36 | — | — | — | — | — |
| 2012–13 | HC Sparta Praha | CZE | 25 | 1 | 12 | 13 | 62 | 7 | 5 | 1 | 6 | 6 |
| 2013–14 | HC Sparta Praha | cZE | 44 | 8 | 21 | 29 | 42 | 10 | 1 | 3 | 4 | 10 |
| 2014–15 | HC Sparta Praha | ELH | 25 | 2 | 9 | 11 | 30 | 10 | 2 | 6 | 8 | 10 |
| 2014–15 | Mountfield HK | CZE | 9 | 0 | 9 | 9 | 2 | — | — | — | — | — |
| 2015–16 | Mountfield HK | CZE | 47 | 7 | 19 | 26 | 66 | 3 | 0 | 1 | 1 | 6 |
| 2016–17 | Anyang Halla | ALH | 12 | 1 | 3 | 4 | 6 | — | — | — | — | — |
| 2016–17 | HC Verva Litvínov | CZE | 20 | 5 | 3 | 8 | 20 | 5 | 0 | 1 | 1 | 4 |
| 2016–17 | HC Most | CZE-2 | 4 | 0 | 1 | 1 | 4 | — | — | — | — | — |
| 2017–18 | HC Verva Litvínov | CZE | 35 | 2 | 4 | 6 | 49 | — | — | — | — | — |
| ELH totals | | | 414 | 60 | 153 | 213 | 585 | 76 | 12 | 20 | 32 | 178 |
| NHL totals | | | 90 | 6 | 24 | 30 | 42 | 12 | 1 | 4 | 5 | 12 |

=== International ===
| Year | Team | Event | Results | GP | G | A | Pts | PIM |
|---|---|---|---|---|---|---|---|---|
| 2001 | Czech Republic | WC | 1st place, gold medalist(s) | 9 | 0 | 0 | 0 | 6 |
| Senior totals | | | | 9 | 0 | 0 | 0 | 6 |
