= Ladislav Nagy =

Slovak ice hockey player (born 1979)

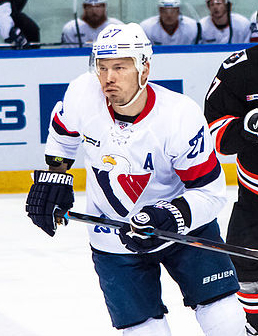
- Born: 1 June 1979 (age 46) Košice, Czechoslovakia
- Height: 5 ft 11 in (180 cm)
- Weight: 192 lb (87 kg; 13 st 10 lb)
- Position: Left wing
- Shot: Left
- Played for: HC Prešov; HC Košice; St. Louis Blues; Phoenix Coyotes; Mora IK; Dallas Stars; Los Angeles Kings; Severstal Cherepovets; HK SKP Poprad; Modo Hockey; HC Lev Poprad; HC Dinamo Minsk; Jokerit; HC Slovan Bratislava
- National team: Slovakia
- NHL draft: 177th overall, 1997; St. Louis Blues
- Playing career: 1996–2019

Ladislav Nagy (Hungarian pronunciation: [ˈnɒɟ]; born 1 June 1979) is a Slovak former professional ice hockey player. He played eight seasons as a left winger in the National Hockey League (NHL) with the St. Louis Blues, Phoenix Coyotes, Dallas Stars, and Los Angeles Kings.

== Early life ==
Nagy was born into an ethnically Hungarian family in Šaca, (borough of Košice, then in Czechoslovakia) on 1 June 1979.

== Career ==
As a youth, Nagy played in the 1993 Quebec International Pee-Wee Hockey Tournament with a team from Poprad. He began his career in 1995 as a junior by HC Košice in the Slovak Extraliga. He was drafted 177th overall in the 1997 NHL entry draft by the St. Louis Blues. After being drafted Nagy came to North America and played with the Halifax Mooseheads on the QMJHL for the 1998–99 season and was named the fans 7th most popular player during the 15 year celebrations.

Nagy made his professional debut in the AHL playoffs later that year with the Worcester Ice Cats. Nagy played with the Blues then from 1999 to 2001, and was traded to the Coyotes with Michal Handzus, Jeff Taffe and a first round pick in the 2002 draft in exchange for Keith Tkachuk. During his time with the Coyotes, Nagy posted 3 straight 20+ goal seasons from 2001 to 2004, and notched 50 points from 2002–03 to 2005–06. However, his goal and point production would quickly decline in the latter season.

On 12 February 2007, Nagy was traded to the Dallas Stars for winger Mathias Tjärnqvist and a first-round pick in the 2007 NHL entry draft. On 2 July 2007, Nagy signed with the Los Angeles Kings, after coming off a disappointing stint in Dallas. However Ladislav was limited to only 38 games during the 2007–08 season due to injury.

On 18 August 2008 Nagy signed with Cherepovets of the Russian Kontinental Hockey League for two years worth 5.6 million. Nagy intended to use this time to get back to the NHL by regaining his form and health.

In December 2010, Nagy signed for Swedish strugglers Modo Hockey for the rest of the season, joining compatriot Ľuboš Bartečko at the club. On 1 August 2013, Nagy returned to his original club in Slovakia, HC Košice, on a one-year deal for the 2013–14 season.

Nagy played his last professional season in 2018–19, ending his 23-year career in his homeland with Slovakia as the hosts of the 2019 World Championships. In his final competitive game, Nagy captained Slovakia and scored the shootout winning goal over Denmark on 21 May 2019.

== Career statistics ==
=== Regular season and playoffs ===
Bold indicates led league

			Regular season					Playoffs
Season	Team	League	GP	G	A	Pts	PIM	GP	G	A	Pts	PIM
1995–96	HC Košice	SVK U20	45	29	30	59	105	—	—	—	—	—
1995–96	Dragon Prešov	SVK	11	6	5	11	10	—	—	—	—	—
1996–97	HC Košice	SVK U20	9	10	7	17	26	—	—	—	—	—
1996–97	Dragon Prešov	SVK.2	33	22	18	40	46	—	—	—	—	—
1997–98	HC Košice	SVK	29	19	15	34	41	11	2	4	6	6
1997–98	HC VTJ MEZ Michalovce	SVK.2	1	0	0	0	2	—	—	—	—	—
1998–99	Halifax Mooseheads	QMJHL	63	71	55	126	148	5	3	3	6	18
1998–99	Worcester Ice Cats	AHL	—	—	—	—	—	3	2	2	4	0
1999–2000	Worcester Ice Cats	AHL	69	23	28	51	67	2	1	0	1	0
1999–2000	St. Louis Blues	NHL	11	2	4	6	2	6	1	1	2	0
2000–01	Worcester Ice Cats	AHL	20	6	14	20	36	—	—	—	—	—
2000–01	St. Louis Blues	NHL	40	8	8	16	20	—	—	—	—	—
2000–01	Phoenix Coyotes	NHL	6	0	1	1	2	—	—	—	—	—
2001–02	Phoenix Coyotes	NHL	74	23	19	42	50	5	0	0	0	21
2002–03	HC Košice	SVK	1	2	1	3	0	—	—	—	—	—
2002–03	Phoenix Coyotes	NHL	80	22	35	57	92	—	—	—	—	—
2003–04	Phoenix Coyotes	NHL	55	24	28	52	46	—	—	—	—	—
2004–05	HC Košice	SVK	18	9	7	16	40	—	—	—	—	—
2004–05	Mora IK	SEL	19	4	4	8	22	—	—	—	—	—
2005–06	Phoenix Coyotes	NHL	51	15	41	56	74	—	—	—	—	—
2006–07	Phoenix Coyotes	NHL	55	8	33	41	48	—	—	—	—	—
2006–07	Dallas Stars	NHL	25	4	10	14	6	7	1	1	2	2
2007–08	Los Angeles Kings	NHL	38	9	17	26	18	—	—	—	—	—
2008–09	Severstal Cherepovets	KHL	45	5	14	19	103	—	—	—	—	—
2009–10	Severstal Cherepovets	KHL	44	9	13	22	36	—	—	—	—	—
2010–11	HC 07 Prešov	SVK.2	2	0	1	1	16	—	—	—	—	—
2010–11	HK Poprad	SVK	24	12	17	29	107	—	—	—	—	—
2010–11	Modo Hockey	SEL	25	12	12	24	46	—	—	—	—	—
2011–12	Lev Poprad	KHL	30	7	12	19	59	—	—	—	—	—
2011–12	Dinamo Minsk	KHL	12	1	4	5	8	4	0	0	0	2
2012–13	Modo Hockey	SEL	49	7	15	22	32	5	1	1	2	2
2013–14	HC Košice	SVK	22	9	14	23	34	—	—	—	—	—
2013–14	Jokerit	Liiga	34	12	20	32	16	2	0	0	0	29
2014–15	HC Slovan Bratislava	KHL	51	23	18	41	60	—	—	—	—	—
2015–16	HC Slovan Bratislava	KHL	48	7	8	15	34	4	0	0	0	14
2016–17	HC Košice	SVK	50	**29**	32	**61**	121	2	1	0	1	4
2017–18	HC Košice	SVK	42	22	19	41	38	5	0	3	3	4
2018–19	HC Košice	SVK	48	**34**	27	61	28	6	2	2	4	4
SVK totals			245	142	137	279	419	24	5	9	14	18
NHL totals			435	115	196	311	358	18	2	2	4	23
KHL totals			230	52	71	123	310	8	0	0	0	16

=== International ===
Medal record

Representing Slovakia

World Championships
Gold medal – first place	2002 Gothenburg	
Bronze medal – third place	2003 Helsinki	

World Junior Championships
Bronze medal – third place	1999 Winnipeg	

Year	Team	Event	Result	GP	G	A	Pts	PIM
1997	Slovakia	EJC18	6th	5	1	0	1	6
1998	Slovakia	WJC	9th	6	6	2	8	12
1999	Slovakia	WJC	3rd place, bronze medalist(s)	6	4	3	7	6
2001	Slovakia	WC	7th	7	2	1	3	6
2002	Slovakia	WC	1st place, gold medalist(s)	6	1	3	4	6
2003	Slovakia	WC	3rd place, bronze medalist(s)	9	4	4	8	10
2004	Slovakia	WCH	7th	4	1	0	1	0
2009	Slovakia	WC	10th	6	1	2	3	2
2011	Slovakia	WC	10th	4	3	2	5	4
2014	Slovakia	WC	9th	7	4	0	4	6
2018	Slovakia	OG	11th	4	0	1	1	2
2018	Slovakia	WC	9th	7	1	9	10	4
2019	Slovakia	WC	9th	7	2	3	5	12
Junior totals				17	11	5	16	24
Senior totals				61	19	25	44	52

== Awards and honours ==
Award	Year
QMJHL
All-Rookie Team	1999
Michel Bergeron Trophy (Offensive rookie of the year)	1999
Rookie of the Year	1999
CHL All-Rookie Team	1999
AHL
All-Star Game	2000

Awards and achievements
Preceded by Mike Ribeiro	Michel Bergeron Trophy; 1998–99	Succeeded by Christopher Montgomery
