= Radim Rulík =

Czech ice hockey coach

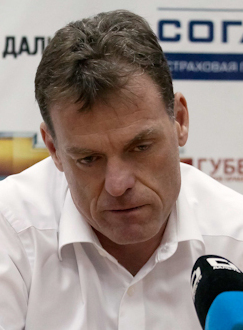
- Born: 25 June 1965 (age 61); Ostrov, Czechoslovakia
- Occupation: Hockey Manager

Radim Rulík (born 25 June 1965) is a Czech ice hockey coach. He was the head coach of Czech Republic men's national ice hockey team from June 2023 to May 2026.

== Coaching career ==
Rulík's coaching career began as an assistant coach for the HC Karlovy Vary in 1991. Then he was also an assistant coach for the HC Plzeň, Avangard Omsk and the Czech Republic national junior team. He was an assistant coach of the Czech Republic national team alongside Vladimír Růžička at the 2004 World Cup of Hockey and the 2005 IIHF World Championship where they won gold medals. He debuted first time as a head coach for the HC Karlovy Vary in the 2004–05 season. He was first and only head coach of the KHL club HC Lev Poprad.
