= Ľuboš Bartečko =

Slovak ice hockey player (born 1976)

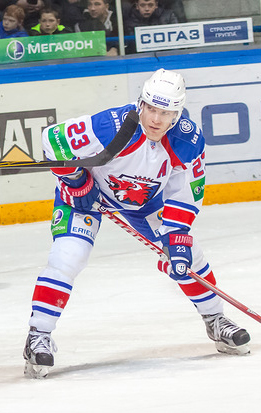
- Bartecko with Lev Praha in 2012
- Born: July 14, 1976 (age 50) Kežmarok, Czechoslovakia
- Height: 5 ft 11 in (180 cm)
- Weight: 200 lb (91 kg; 14 st 4 lb)
- Position: Left wing
- Shot: Left
- Played for: HK ŠKP Poprad; St. Louis Blues; Atlanta Thrashers; HC Sparta Praha; HC Dynamo Moscow; Luleå HF; MHK Kezmarok; SC Bern; Färjestad BK; Modo Hockey; Lev Poprad; HC Lev Praha; Piráti Chomutov
- National team: Slovakia
- NHL draft: Undrafted
- Playing career: 1997–2016

Ľuboš Bartečko (born July 14, 1976) is a Slovak former ice hockey coach and former professional player. He is the current head coach of the Red River Spartans of the United States Premier Hockey League (USPHL). He began and concluded his career with hometown club, HK ŠKP Poprad in the Slovak Extraliga. He most notably played in the National Hockey League (NHL) for the St. Louis Blues and Atlanta Thrashers. He also competed at three Winter Olympics.

== Playing career ==
Before Bartečko started his career in the NHL he played for the Chicoutimi Saguenéens and Drummondville Voltigeurs in the Quebec Major Junior Hockey League (QMJHL) and for the Worcester Ice Cats of the American Hockey League (AHL). He started his NHL career in 1998–99 with the St. Louis Blues.

His best year was the 1999–2000 season when he scored 16 goals and 39 points in 67 games and often played on a line with his fellow countrymen Pavol Demitra and Michal Handzuš. In 2001, he moved to Atlanta, playing for the Atlanta Thrashers. Since the 2003–04 season he returned to Europe, where he played for HC Sparta Praha in the Czech Extraliga and for HC Dynamo Moscow of Russian Superleague (RSL), where he won the league title in 2004–05.

After completing his 21 professional season, with his original club HK ŠKP Poprad in 2015–16, Bartečko announced his retirement from professional hockey and return to North America, in accepting an assistant coaching role in Illinois, with McKendree University Bearcats who compete in the ACHA Division II on August 24, 2016.

== Career statistics ==
=== Regular season and playoffs ===
			Regular season					Playoffs
Season	Team	League	GP	G	A	Pts	PIM	GP	G	A	Pts	PIM
1993–94	HK ŠKP Poprad	SVK	2	0	1	1	0	—	—	—	—	—
1994–95	HK ŠKP Poprad	SVK	3	1	0	1	0	—	—	—	—	—
1995–96	Chicoutimi Saguenéens	QMJHL	70	32	41	73	50	17	8	15	23	10
1996–97	Drummondville Voltigeurs	QMJHL	58	40	51	91	47	8	1	8	9	4
1997–98	Worcester IceCats	AHL	34	10	12	22	24	10	4	2	6	2
1998–99	HK ŠKP Poprad	SVK	1	1	0	1	0	—	—	—	—	—
1998–99	St. Louis Blues	NHL	32	5	11	16	6	5	0	0	0	2
1998–99	Worcester IceCats	AHL	49	14	24	38	22	—	—	—	—	—
1999–00	St. Louis Blues	NHL	67	16	23	39	51	7	1	1	2	0
1999–00	Worcester IceCats	AHL	12	4	7	11	4	—	—	—	—	—
2000–01	St. Louis Blues	NHL	50	5	8	13	12	—	—	—	—	—
2001–02	Atlanta Thrashers	NHL	71	13	14	27	30	—	—	—	—	—
2002–03	Atlanta Thrashers	NHL	37	7	9	16	8	—	—	—	—	—
2003–04	HC Sparta Praha	ELH	25	12	8	20	45	13	2	4	6	26
2004–05	HC Dynamo Moscow	RSL	40	6	10	16	28	7	0	1	1	2
2005–06	HK ŠKP Poprad	SVK	7	4	1	5	36	—	—	—	—	—
2005–06	Luleå HF	SEL	50	14	26	40	32	6	3	3	6	35
2006–07	HK ŠKP Poprad	SVK	14	3	4	7	10	—	—	—	—	—
2006–07	Luleå HF	SEL	44	22	27	49	46	2	0	0	0	0
2007–08	MHK Kežmarok	SVK	7	5	4	9	2	—	—	—	—	—
2007–08	Luleå HF	SEL	48	16	21	37	79	—	—	—	—	—
2008–09	MHK Kežmarok	SVK	13	5	5	10	29	—	—	—	—	—
2008–09	Luleå HF	SEL	44	12	11	23	22	5	0	0	0	16
2009–10	SC Bern	NLA	28	8	11	19	32	—	—	—	—	—
2009–10	Färjestad BK	SEL	11	7	5	12	2	7	1	3	4	2
2010–11	HK ŠKP Poprad	SVK	13	6	7	13	24	—	—	—	—	—
2010–11	Modo	SEL	25	7	10	17	8	—	—	—	—	—
2011–12	Lev Poprad	KHL	53	16	14	30	30	—	—	—	—	—
2012–13	Lev Praha	KHL	32	6	5	11	8	—	—	—	—	—
2013–14	Piráti Chomutov	ELH	45	8	10	18	32	—	—	—	—	—
2014–15	HK ŠKP Poprad	SVK	38	12	21	33	53	10	1	3	4	16
2015–16	HK ŠKP Poprad	SVK	46	8	18	26	4	—	—	—	—	—
NHL totals			257	46	65	111	107	12	1	1	2	2
KHL totals			85	22	19	41	38	—	—	—	—	—

=== International ===
Medal record

Representing Slovakia

Ice hockey

World Championships
Gold medal – first place	2002 Gothenburg	
Silver medal – second place	2000 Saint Petersburg	

Year	Team	Event	GP	G	A	Pts	PIM
2000	Slovakia	WC	7	2	3	5	14
2002	Slovakia	OG	4	0	1	1	0
2002	Slovakia	WC	9	2	2	4	2
2004	Slovakia	WC	9	2	2	4	6
2004	Slovakia	WCH	4	0	1	1	2
2005	Slovakia	WC	7	0	1	1	4
2006	Slovakia	OG	6	0	0	0	6
2009	Slovakia	WC	6	3	0	3	6
2010	Slovakia	OG	7	0	1	1	0
2011	Slovakia	WC	4	1	1	2	8
Senior totals			63	10	12	22	48
