= HC Lev Poprad =

Former ice hockey team

- Nickname: Lions
- City: Poprad, Slovakia
- League: Kontinental Hockey League (2011–12)
- Founded: 2010
- Folded: 2012
- Home arena: Tatravagonka Arena (capacity: 4,500)
- Colours

Franchise history
- Hockey Club Lev Poprad

Hockey Club Lev Poprad (Lion), was a professional ice hockey team and a former member of the Kontinental Hockey League (KHL) based in Poprad, Slovakia. The Lev existed for only one year, playing in the 2011–12 KHL season.

== History ==
The team was originally called HC Lev Hradec Kralove and was based in Hradec Králové, Czech Republic. It had been intended to join the KHL for the 2010–11 season, for which it fulfilled all necessary conditions except that the Czech Ice Hockey Association refused to give permission to the club. Because of that, Lev's management decided to move the club to Slovakia, and was accepted by the KHL's administration to participate in the league in the 2010–11 season. However, the KHL later excluded the team from the league for the 2010–11 season because the team was not part of any national ice hockey governing body.

Lev's previous logo featured the city name Hradec Králové before relocating.

After further efforts, including joining the Slovak Ice Hockey Federation, Lev Poprad was officially admitted to the KHL in May 2011. During the 2011–12 season, they played in the Bobrov division of the KHL, while HK Poprad continued playing their Slovak Extraliga matches in the same arena.

=== 2011–12 season ===
Almost two months after being officially admitted to the KHL, Lev announced the signings of the first five players on 30 June 2011. In the final roster, the majority of the players were from Slovakia and Czech Republic. Head coach was Radim Rulík and the team captain was Ľuboš Bartečko. Lev's regular season was planned to start on 10 September 2011 with a match at home against Avangard Omsk, but because of the 2011 Lokomotiv Yaroslavl plane crash, the start of the season was postponed and Lev had their first game on 12 September against Metallurg Magnitogorsk. However, for their first win they had to wait until the sixth game, a 2–0 away win against Dinamo Riga on 26 September. Lev also failed to qualify for the play-offs and ended the season as 21st overall, with 54 points from 54 games. The team's top scorer was Ľuboš Bartečko with 30 points (16 goals and 14 assists).

=== New team in Prague ===
Late in the 2011–12 season, a change of owners renewed speculation about a move to Prague, Czech Republic. In March 2012, the Czech Ice Hockey Association granted permission for a KHL team to play in the Czech Republic, and at the end of April, a newly found team with the same name, HC Lev, but as a different organization, officially applied to the KHL to play in Prague. The Poprad-based HC Lev was disbanded after only one season.

== Season-by-season record ==
Note: GP = Games played, W = Wins, OTW = Overtime Wins, SOW = Penalty Shootout Wins, SOL = Penalty Shootout Losses, L = Losses, GF = Goals for, GA = Goals against, Pts = Points

| Season | GP | W | OTW | SOW | SOL | OTL | L | GF | GA | Pts | Finish | Playoffs |
|---|---|---|---|---|---|---|---|---|---|---|---|---|
| 2011–12 | 54 | 13 | 0 | 3 | 5 | 4 | 29 | 125 | 162 | 54 | 6th, Bobrov | Did not qualify |

== Franchise history ==
=== Milestones ===
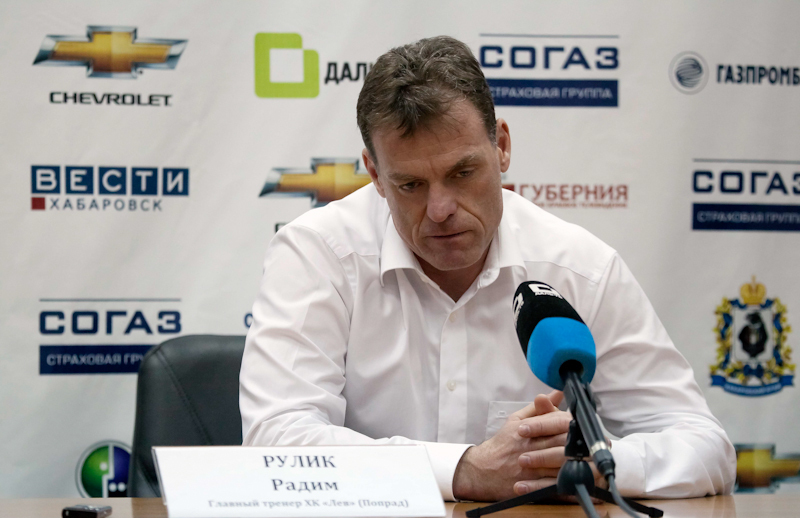
Radim Rulík was a head coach for Lev Poprad during the 2011–12 season.

| Event | Date | Details |
|---|---|---|
| First KHL match (at home) | 12 September 2011 | 2–4 loss vs Metallurg Magnitogorsk |
| First KHL point | 21 September 2011 | 3–4 SO loss at Atlant Moscow Oblast |
| First KHL win | 26 September 2011 | 2–0 win at Dinamo Riga |
| First KHL shutout | 26 September 2011 | 2–0 win at Dinamo Riga |
| First KHL win at home | 30 September 2011 | 4–1 win vs Dynamo Moscow |

=== Franchise scoring leaders ===
These are the top-ten point-scorers in KHL franchise history.

Note: Pos = Position; GP = Games played; G = Goals; A = Assists; Pts = Points; P/G = Points per game

Points
| Player | Pos | GP | G | A | Pts | P/G |
|---|---|---|---|---|---|---|
| Ľuboš Bartečko | LW | 53 | 16 | 14 | 30 | 0.57 |
| Tomáš Netík | LW | 42 | 17 | 11 | 28 | 0.67 |
| Juraj Mikúš | C | 44 | 12 | 16 | 28 | 0.64 |
| Václav Nedorost | LW | 37 | 14 | 8 | 22 | 0.59 |
| Ladislav Nagy | LW | 30 | 7 | 12 | 19 | 0.63 |
| Rastislav Špirko | LW | 53 | 10 | 8 | 18 | 0.34 |
| Karel Pilař | D | 31 | 1 | 16 | 17 | 0.55 |
| Jaroslav Kristek | RW | 39 | 10 | 6 | 16 | 0.41 |
| Emil Lundberg | C | 54 | 10 | 6 | 16 | 0.30 |
| Branislav Mezei | LW | 53 | 3 | 11 | 14 | 0.26 |

Goals
| Player | Pos | G |
|---|---|---|
| Tomáš Netík | LW | 17 |
| Ľuboš Bartečko | LW | 16 |
| Václav Nedorost | LW | 14 |
| Juraj Mikúš | C | 12 |
| Rastislav Špirko | LW | 10 |
| Jaroslav Kristek | RW | 10 |
| Emil Lundberg | C | 10 |
| Ladislav Nagy | LW | 7 |
| Stepan Novotny | RW | 5 |
| Martin Chabada | RW | 4 |

Assists
| Player | Pos | A |
|---|---|---|
| Juraj Mikúš | C | 16 |
| Karel Pilař | D | 16 |
| Ľuboš Bartečko | LW | 14 |
| Ladislav Nagy | LW | 12 |
| Tomáš Netík | LW | 11 |
| Branislav Mezei | D | 11 |
| Jiří Hunkes | D | 10 |
| Václav Nedorost | LW | 8 |
| Rastislav Špirko | RW | 8 |
| Jiří Sekáč | C | 8 |

== Tatranski Vlci ==
Affiliated with Lev Poprad were the Tatranski Vlci (Tatra Wolves), a junior team playing in the Northwest division of the Junior Hockey League (MHL). The team consisted of Czech and Slovak players born 1990 or later. They played their home games in nearby Spišská Nová Ves. Just as HC Lev, the Vlci were also disbanded after only one season.

== See also ==
- HC Lev Praha
