= 2008–09 Czech Extraliga season =

2008–09 Czech Extraliga
- League: Czech Extraliga
- Sport: Ice hockey
- Duration: September 2008 – April 2009
- Teams: 14
- TV partner: Česká televize

Regular season
- Presidential Cup: Slavia Praha
- Top scorer: Jaroslav Bednář (Slavia Praha)

Playoffs

Finals
- Champions: Karlovy Vary
- Runners-up: Slavia Praha

Czech Extraliga seasons
- ← 2007–08 2009–10 →

The 2008–09 Czech Extraliga season was the 16th season of the Czech Extraliga since its creation after the breakup of Czechoslovakia and the Czechoslovak First Ice Hockey League in 1993. HC Energie Karlovy Vary won their first Extraliga championship after beating Slavia Praha by 4 games to 2 in the finals.

== Standings ==
Place	Team	GP	W	OTW	OTL	L	Goals	Pts
1.	HC Slavia Praha	52	23	9	6	14	176:150	93
2.	HC Moeller Pardubice	52	24	5	8	15	162:149	90
3.	HC Litvínov	52	23	7	3	19	159:146	86
4.	HC Sparta Praha	52	22	7	6	17	147:137	86
5.	RI Okna Zlín	52	21	9	3	19	145:151	84
6.	HC Energie Karlovy Vary	52	20	7	9	16	150:142	83
7.	HC Lasselsberger Plzeň	52	24	2	6	20	160:157	82
8.	HC Vítkovice Steel	52	20	7	5	20	145:132	79
9.	Bílí Tygři Liberec	52	21	2	7	22	159:161	74
10.	HC Oceláři Třinec	52	16	8	7	21	167:175	71
11.	HC České Budějovice	52	19	4	6	23	137:146	71
12.	HC Znojemští Orli	52	17	5	7	23	126:144	68
13.	HC Geus Okna Kladno	52	14	8	8	22	132:160	66
14.	BK Mladá Boleslav	52	15	5	4	28	131:146	59

== Playoffs ==
=== Preliminary round ===
- HC Plzen - HC Ocleari Trinec 3-2 on series
- HC Vitkovice Steel - Bili Tygri Liberec 3-0 on series

=== Quarterfinals ===
- HC Slavia Praha - HC Vitkovice Steel 4-3 on series
- HC Moeller Pardubice - HC Plzen 3-4 on series
- HC Litvinov - HC Energie Karlovy Vary 0-4 on series
- HC Sparta Praha - Rl Okna Zlin 4-1 on series

=== Semifinals ===
- HC Slavia Praha - HC Plzen 4-1 on series
- HC Energie Karlovy Vary - HC Sparta Praha 4-2 on series

=== Final ===
- HC Energie Karlovy Vary - HC Slavia Praha 4-2 on series

== Playouts ==
Place	Team	GP	W	OTW	OTL	L	Goals	Pts
11.	HC České Budějovice	64	23	6	7	28	164:172	88
12.	HC Geus Okna Kladno	64	19	10	9	26	164:190	86
13.	HC Znojemští Orli	64	20	6	10	28	150:181	82
14.	BK Mladá Boleslav	64	20	7	6	31	163:168	80

=== Relegation ===
- BK Mladá Boleslav – HC Slovan Ústečtí Lvi 4–0 (3–0, 2–1 OT, 3–1, 2–0)
- After season, the Extraliga licence was transferred from team HC Znojemští Orli to HC Kometa Brno.
