= Branislav Rapáč =

Slovak ice hockey player

- Born: 4 June 1993 (age 32) Spišská Nová Ves, Slovakia
- Height: 6 ft 2 in (188 cm)
- Weight: 185 lb (84 kg; 13 st 3 lb)
- Position: Left wing
- Shoots: Right
- Slovak team Former teams: HK Spišská Nová Ves; HK Poprad; HK Orange 20; MHC Martin; HK Nitra; ŠHK 37 Piešťany; HC Dynamo Pardubice; MHk 32 Liptovský Mikuláš; HC Košice; HC Slovan Bratislava
- NHL draft: Undrafted
- Playing career: 2011–present

Branislav Rapáč (born 4 June 1993) is a Slovak professional ice hockey winger playing for HK Spišská Nová Ves of the Slovak Extraliga, which he co-manages with his brother Richard Rapáč.

== Career statistics ==
=== Regular season and playoffs ===
			Regular season					Playoffs
Season	Team	League	GP	G	A	Pts	PIM	GP	G	A	Pts	PIM
2009–10	HC Oceláři Třinec	Czech-Jr.	30	5	10	15	18	3	2	0	2	0
2010–11	HC Oceláři Třinec	Czech-Jr.	44	9	16	25	24	2	1	0	1	2
2011–12	HK Poprad	Slovak-Jr.	2	0	2	2	0	—	—	—	—	—
2011–12	Des Moines Buccaneers	USHL	21	2	4	6	45	—	—	—	—	—
2012–13	HK Poprad	Slovak	22	2	5	7	38	—	—	—	—	—
2012–13	HK Orange 20	Slovak	5	0	1	1	4	—	—	—	—	—
2012–13	MHC Martin	Slovak-Jr.	0	0	0	0	0	—	—	—	—	—
2012–13	MHC Martin	Slovak	7	0	0	0	18	—	—	—	—	—
2013–14	HK Nitra	Slovak-Jr.	1	0	1	1	0	—	—	—	—	—
2013–14	HK Nitra	Slovak	3	0	1	1	0	—	—	—	—	—
2013–14	Brookings Blizzard	NAHL	14	2	3	5	23	—	—	—	—	—
2014–15	ŠHK 37 Piešťany	Slovak	39	12	10	22	44	—	—	—	—	—
2015–16	HK Poprad	Slovak	32	10	18	28	43	—	—	—	—	—
2015–16	HC Dynamo Pardubice	ELH	22	4	2	6	18	—	—	—	—	—
2016–17	HC Dynamo Pardubice	ELH	10	0	3	3	2	—	—	—	—	—
2016–17	HK Poprad	Slovak	13	3	5	8	10	—	—	—	—	—
2016–17	MHC Martin	Slovak	23	2	8	10	4	11	2	2	4	20
2017–18	MHk 32 Liptovský Mikuláš	Slovak	42	12	6	18	65	—	—	—	—	—
2018–19	HK Nitra	Slovak	49	14	25	39	34	15	4	2	6	22
2019–20	HC Košice	Slovak	52	16	15	31	52	—	—	—	—	—
2020–21	HC Slovan Bratislava	Slovak	37	8	5	13	54	10	0	3	3	24
2021–22	HK Spišská Nová Ves	Slovak	42	12	14	26	92	2	0	0	0	24
2022–23	HK Spišská Nová Ves	Slovak	42	12	14	26	92	2	0	0	0	24
Czech totals			32	4	5	9	20	—	—	—	—	—
Slovak totals			409	95	133	228	512	57	8	11	19	131

=== International ===
Year	Team	Event	Result	GP	G	A	Pts	PIM
2011	Slovakia	WJC18	10th	6	1	1	2	31
2013	Slovakia	WJC	8th	6	0	0	0	2
Junior totals				12	1	1	2	33
