= Patrik Rogoň =

Slovak ice hockey player

- Born: 16 November 1996 (age 29) Žilina, Slovakia
- Height: 6 ft 0 in (183 cm)
- Weight: 183 lb (83 kg; 13 st 1 lb)
- Position: Right wing
- Shoots: Left
- Slovak team Former teams: HC Košice; MsHK Žilina; HKM Zvolen; HC Nové Zámky
- NHL draft: Undrafted
- Playing career: 2014–present

Patrik Rogoň (born 16 November 1996) is a Slovak professional ice hockey player currently playing for HC Košice of the Slovak Extraliga.

== Career ==
Rogoň began his career with MsHK Žilina's academy and made his senior debut for the team during the 2014–15 season, when he played one game in relegation series against HC 07 Detva.

== Career statistics ==
=== Regular season and playoffs ===
			Regular season					Playoffs
Season	Team	League	GP	G	A	Pts	PIM	GP	G	A	Pts	PIM
2012–13	MsHK Žilina	Slovak-Jr.	2	0	0	0	0	—	—	—	—	—
2013–14	MsHK Žilina	Slovak-Jr.	36	6	12	18	12	—	—	—	—	—
2014–15	MsHK Žilina	Slovak-Jr.	41	12	24	36	34	8	1	6	7	16
2014–15	HKM Zvolen	Slovak-Jr.	2	0	1	1	0	—	—	—	—	—
2015–16	MsHK Žilina	Slovak-Jr.	27	14	20	34	44	8	7	6	13	2
2015–16	MsHK Žilina	Slovak	35	1	2	3	8	4	0	0	0	0
2016–17	MsHKM Žilina	Slovak-Jr.	16	14	16	30	16	5	2	7	9	0
2016–17	MsHK Žilina	Slovak	38	1	2	3	16	11	1	3	4	6
2017–18	MsHK Žilina	Slovak	56	3	1	4	22	5	0	1	1	2
2018–19	HC Nové Zámky	Slovak	57	4	9	13	55	4	0	0	0	2
2018–19	HC Nové Zámky B	Slovak.1	3	2	1	3	2	—	—	—	—	—
2019–20	HC Nové Zámky	Slovak	55	8	9	17	30	—	—	—	—	—
2020–21	HC Nové Zámky	Slovak	43	8	7	15	34	8	3	3	6	4
Slovak totals			284	25	30	55	165	32	4	7	11	14

== Awards and honors ==
Award	Year
Slovak
Champion	2023
