= Alex Breton =

Canadian ice hockey defenceman

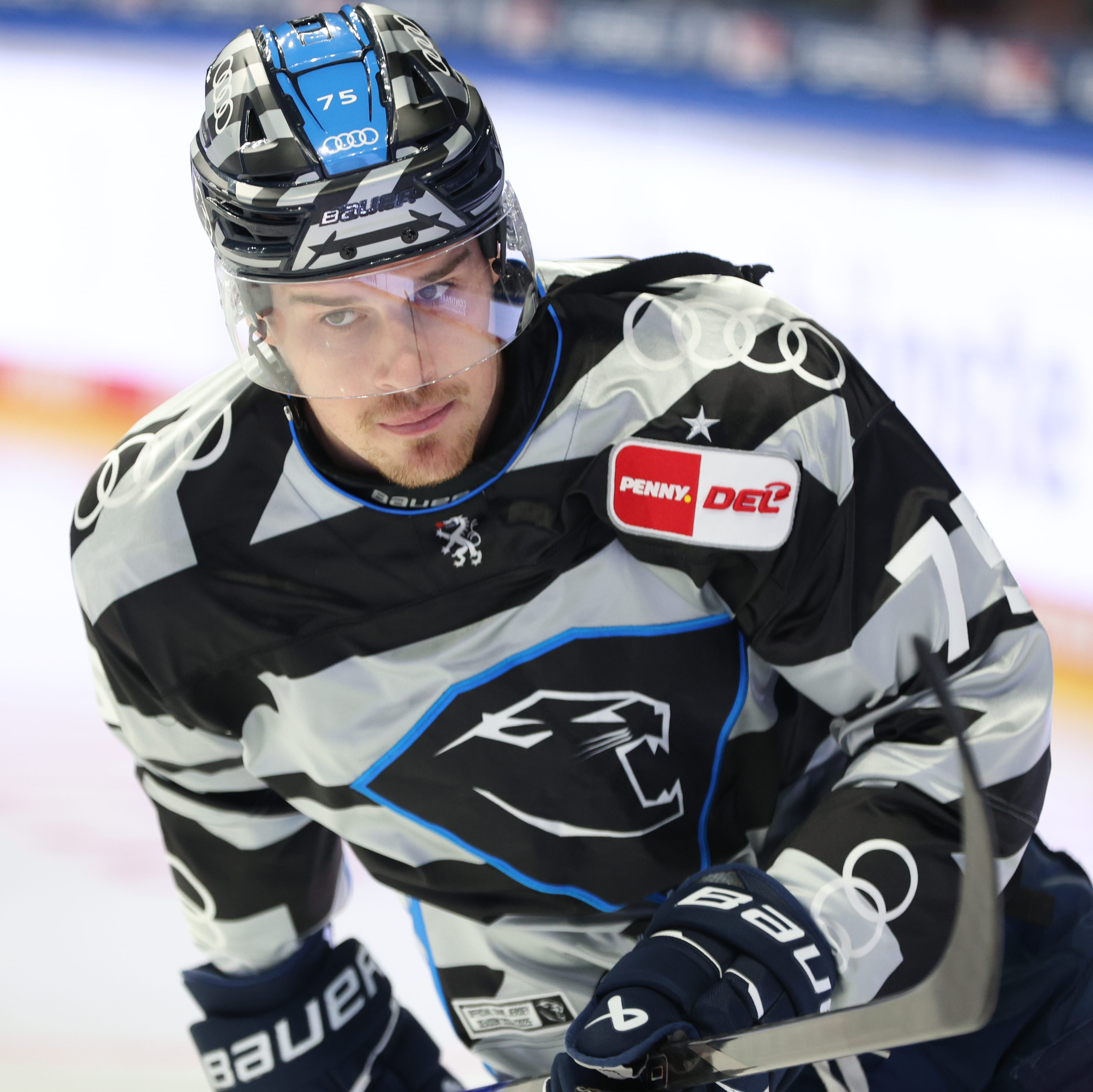
- Alex Breton with ERC Ingolstadt in 2024
- Born: July 5, 1997 (age 28) Sainte-Marie, Quebec, Canada
- Height: 6 ft 1 in (185 cm)
- Weight: 190 lb (86 kg; 13 st 8 lb)
- Position: Defenceman
- Shoots: Left
- DEL team Former teams: ERC Ingolstadt; HC Košice; Belleville Senators; Springfield Thunderbirds; HC '05 Banská Bystrica; HC Slovan Bratislava
- Playing career: 2018–present

Alex Breton (born July 5, 1997) is a Canadian professional ice hockey defenceman who is currently playing for ERC Ingolstadt of the Deutsche Eishockey Liga.

== Career ==
Breton started his career with the ECHL team Allen Americans in 2018. He spent a significant part of his first session on loan with AHL teams Belleville Senators and Springfield Thunderbirds. In his second session, he was named the ECHL defenseman of the year.

Between 2020 and 2022 Breton played in the Slovak Extraliga with HC '05 Banská Bystrica and HC Slovan Bratislava.

Breton returned to the ECHL in the 2022–23 session, playing with the Trois-Rivières Lions as well as going on loan to the AHL team Belleville Senators. By the end of the session, he returned to the Slovak Extraliga, signing with HC Košice. After two sessions at Košice, Breton transferred to the DEL outfit ERC Ingolstadt.

== Career statistics ==
=== Regular season and playoffs ===
| | | | Regular season | | | | | Playoffs |
| Season | Team | League | GP | G | A | Pts | PIM | GP | G | A | Pts | PIM |
|---|---|---|---|---|---|---|---|---|---|---|---|---|
| 2018–19 | Allen Americans | ECHL | 53 | 14 | 25 | 39 | 12 | — | — | — | — | — |
| 2018–19 | Belleville Senators | AHL | 1 | 0 | 0 | 0 | 0 | — | — | — | — | — |
| 2018–19 | Springfield Falcons | AHL | 10 | 3 | 1 | 4 | 4 | — | — | — | — | — |
| 2019–20 | Allen Americans | ECHL | 61 | 11 | 44 | 55 | 32 | — | — | — | — | — |
| 2020–21 | HC '05 Banská Bystrica | SVK | 44 | 11 | 29 | 40 | 18 | 4 | 0 | 3 | 3 | 4 |
| 2021–22 | HC '05 Banská Bystrica | SVK | 22 | 1 | 5 | 6 | 12 | — | — | — | — | — |
| 2021–22 | HC Slovan Bratislava | SVK | 17 | 1 | 7 | 8 | 8 | 13 | 0 | 3 | 3 | 6 |
| 2022–23 | Trois-Rivières Lions | ECHL | 30 | 7 | 18 | 25 | 16 | — | — | — | — | — |
| 2022–23 | Belleville Senators | AHL | 11 | 0 | 2 | 2 | 4 | — | — | — | — | — |
| 2022–23 | HC Košice | SVK | 9 | 0 | 4 | 4 | 2 | 17 | 1 | 8 | 9 | 2 |
| 2023–24 | HC Košice | SVK | 49 | 13 | 27 | 40 | 14 | 11 | 2 | 6 | 8 | 8 |
| 2024–25 | ERC Ingolstadt | DEL | 52 | 20 | 28 | 48 | 22 | 12 | 1 | 6 | 7 | 4 |
| SVK totals | | | 141 | 26 | 72 | 98 | 54 | 45 | 3 | 20 | 23 | 20 |
| AHL totals | | | 22 | 3 | 3 | 6 | 8 | — | — | — | — | — |

== Awards and honors ==
| Award | Year |
Slovak
| Champion | 2022, 2023 |
DEL
| Defenceman of the year | 2025 |
