= Dávid Skokan =

Slovak professional ice hockey centre (born 1988)

- Born: 6 December 1988 (age 37) Poprad, Czechoslovakia
- Height: 6 ft 0 in (183 cm)
- Weight: 183 lb (83 kg; 13 st 1 lb)
- Position: Centre
- Shot: Left
- Played for: HK Poprad; HC Slovan Bratislava; HC Slavia Praha; Mountfield HK; Piráti Chomutov; HC Dynamo Pardubice; Löwen Frankfurt; HC Košice
- National team: Slovakia
- NHL draft: 193rd overall, 2007; New York Rangers
- Playing career: 2005–2023

Dávid Skokan (born 6 December 1988) is retired Slovak professional ice hockey centre.

== Playing career ==
Skokan played 172 times for Slovan Bratislava in the Slovak Extraliga between 2009 and 2012. In 2015 he returned to the club, which was now playing in the Kontinental Hockey League. He also had a brief loan spell at ŠKP Poprad, marking his fourth spell with the club. After just one season in the KHL, Skokan returned to the Czech Extraliga and signed for Piráti Chomutov.

== Career statistics ==
=== Regular season and playoffs ===
Bold indicates led league

			Regular season					Playoffs
Season	Team	League	GP	G	A	Pts	PIM	GP	G	A	Pts	PIM
2004–05	HK Tatravagónka ŠKP Poprad	SVK U18	4	4	6	10	37	—	—	—	—	—
2004–05	HK Tatravagónka ŠKP Poprad	SVK U20	24	5	19	24	52	—	—	—	—	—
2004–05	HK Tatravagónka ŠKP Poprad	Slovak	8	0	0	0	6	2	0	0	0	25
2005–06	Rimouski Océanic	QMJHL	53	6	15	21	143	—	—	—	—	—
2006–07	Rimouski Océanic	QMJHL	52	14	21	35	62	—	—	—	—	—
2007–08	Rimouski Océanic	QMJHL	53	19	21	40	92	—	—	—	—	—
2008–09	HK AquaCity ŠKP Poprad	Slovak	32	9	9	18	83	—	—	—	—	—
2009–10	HC Slovan Bratislava	Slovak	32	11	5	16	70	15	3	3	6	40
2010–11	HC Slovan Bratislava	Slovak	55	13	9	22	78	7	1	2	3	8
2011–12	HC Slovan Bratislava	Slovak	48	7	16	23	86	15	2	8	10	6
2012–13	HK AutoFinance Poprad	Slovak	10	3	6	9	53	—	—	—	—	—
2012–13	HC Slavia Praha	ELH	26	2	5	7	12	11	3	1	4	6
2013–14	HC Slavia Praha	ELH	47	8	10	18	38	5	1	0	1	2
2014–15	Mountfield HK	ELH	31	3	10	13	50	1	0	0	0	2
2015–16	HC Slovan Bratislava	KHL	27	3	2	5	18	—	—	—	—	—
2015–16	HK Poprad	Slovak	4	1	0	1	6	—	—	—	—	—
2016–17	Piráti Chomutov	ELH	47	10	6	16	57	17	5	3	8	42
2017–18	Piráti Chomutov	ELH	43	6	13	19	68	—	—	—	—	—
2018–19	Piráti Chomutov	ELH	7	1	1	2	22	—	—	—	—	—
2018–19	HC Dynamo Pardubice	ELH	21	2	1	3	37	—	—	—	—	—
2018–19	Löwen Frankfurt	DEL2	8	2	9	11	16	15	6	10	16	16
2019–20	HC Košice	Slovak	53	18	35	53	76	—	—	—	—	—
2020–21	HK Poprad	Slovak	49	18	34	52	107	15	**9**	6	15	30
2021–22	HK Poprad	Slovak	29	10	21	31	30	7	1	6	7	10
2022–23	HK Poprad	Slovak	38	6	12	18	38	—	—	—	—	—
Slovak totals			358	96	147	243	633	61	16	25	41	119
ELH totals			222	32	46	78	284	34	9	4	13	52
KHL totals			27	3	2	5	18	—	—	—	—	—

=== International ===
Year	Team	Event	Result	GP	G	A	Pts	PIM
2004	Slovakia	U17	8th	5	1	4	5	14
2006	Slovakia	WJC	8th	3	0	1	1	4
2007	Slovakia	WJC	8th	6	0	2	2	22
2008	Slovakia	WJC	7th	6	2	6	8	6
2014	Slovakia	WC	9th	7	0	0	0	4
2017	Slovakia	WC	14th	3	0	1	1	0
Junior totals				20	3	13	16	46
Senior totals				10	0	1	1	4

== Awards and honours ==
Award	Year
Slovak Extraliga
Champion	2012
Playoffs MVP	2021
