= Jordon Southorn =

Canadian ice hockey player

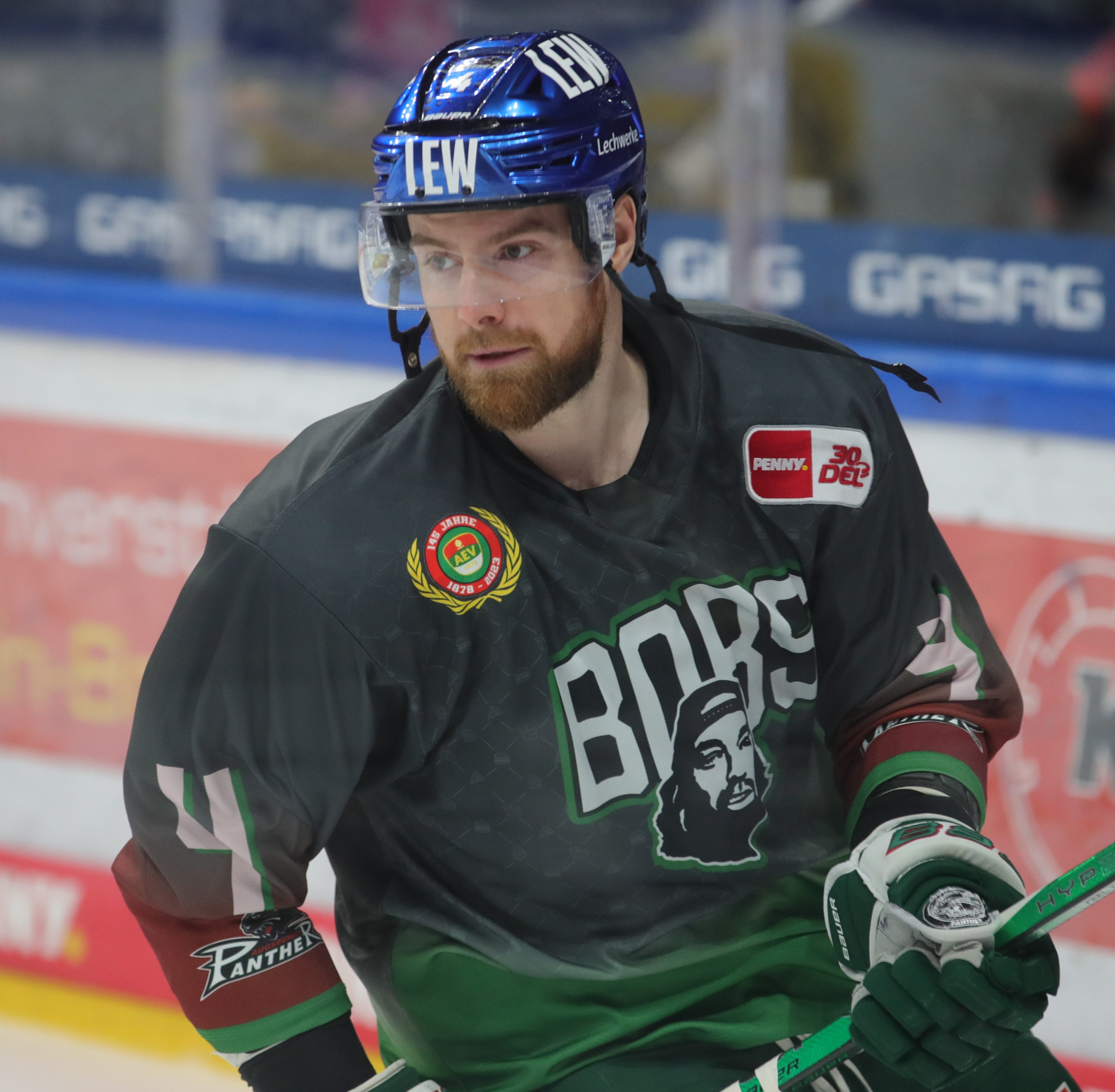
- Jordon Southorn, 2023
- Born: May 15, 1990 (age 35) Montreal, Quebec, Canada
- Height: 6 ft 2 in (188 cm)
- Weight: 187 lb (85 kg; 13 st 5 lb)
- Position: Defence
- Shoots: Left
- EIHL team Former teams: Sheffield Steelers; Dundee Stars; Barys Astana; HC '05 Banská Bystrica; HK Dukla Michalovce; Dinamo Riga; HC Košice; Augsburger Panther; Brûleurs de Loups
- NHL draft: 104th overall, 2008; Buffalo Sabres
- Playing career: 2010–present

Jordon Southorn (born May 15, 1990) is a Canadian professional ice hockey defenceman. He is currently playing for Sheffield Steelers of the Elite Ice Hockey League.

He was selected by the Buffalo Sabres in the fourth round (104th overall) of the 2008 NHL entry draft.

== Playing career ==
Southorn played four seasons (2006–2010) of major junior hockey in the Quebec Major Junior Hockey League with the Prince Edward Island Rocket. Unsigned from the Sabres, on September 4, 2012, the Elmira Jackals of the ECHL signed Southorn for the 2012–13 season.

After a short stint in the Elite Ice Hockey League with the Dundee Stars, Southorn returned to the ECHL with the Fort Wayne Komets in the 2013–14 season.

Having played a single game on loan with the Pirates in the season prior, on July 31, 2014, Southorn signed a one-year AHL contract with the Portland Pirates. In the 2014–15 season, Southorn was limited by injury an appeared in 26 games with the Pirates for 9 points. He was loaned to ECHL affiliate, the Gwinnett Gladiators on two occasions, totalling 9 points in just 8 games.

On August 5, 2015, unable to secure an AHL contract, Southorn returned on a one-year deal for a second stint with the Fort Wayne Komets of the ECHL.

In the following off-season, Southorn left for abroad as a free agent, signing a one-year deal with Russian second division club, Torpedo Ust-Kamenogorsk of the VHL on August 12, 2016. He made his Kontinental Hockey League debut in the following 2017-18 season, with parent affiliate Barys Astana making 23 appearances for four assists.

On July 24, 2018, Southorn left Kazakhstan after two seasons and agreed to an initial try-out contract with German club, the Straubing Tigers of the Deutsche Eishockey Liga (DEL). Following his release from Straubing, Southorn opted to return to North America and the ECHL, securing a one-year contract with the Florida Everblades on September 28, 2018. In the 2018–19 season, Southorn collected 17 points in 21 games before leaving the club to accept a European contract with HC '05 Banská Bystrica of the Slovak Extraliga on December 10, 2018.

== Career statistics ==
			Regular season					Playoffs
Season	Team	League	GP	G	A	Pts	PIM	GP	G	A	Pts	PIM
2006–07	P.E.I. Rocket	QMJHL	58	5	5	10	76	7	0	0	0	2
2007–08	P.E.I. Rocket	QMJHL	69	12	19	31	70	4	0	1	1	4
2008–09	P.E.I. Rocket	QMJHL	64	6	35	41	71	5	0	2	2	10
2009–10	P.E.I. Rocket	QMJHL	67	4	19	23	62	5	0	0	0	7
2010–11	Trenton Devils	ECHL	35	0	9	9	38	—	—	—	—	—
2011–12	Trenton Devils	ECHL	28	6	10	16	29	—	—	—	—	—
2011–12	Providence Bruins	AHL	2	0	0	0	0	—	—	—	—	—
2011–12	Wheeling Nailers	ECHL	22	2	3	5	15	3	0	0	0	0
2012–13	Elmira Jackals	ECHL	64	11	23	34	77	6	1	1	2	6
2013–14	Elmira Jackals	ECHL	3	1	3	4	7	—	—	—	—	—
2013–14	Dundee Stars	EIHL	3	0	2	2	4	—	—	—	—	—
2013–14	Fort Wayne Komets	ECHL	53	12	20	32	40	11	2	3	5	24
2013–14	Portland Pirates	AHL	1	0	2	2	0	—	—	—	—	—
2014–15	Portland Pirates	AHL	26	3	6	9	8	—	—	—	—	—
2014–15	Gwinnett Gladiators	ECHL	8	2	7	9	8	—	—	—	—	—
2015–16	Fort Wayne Komets	ECHL	62	9	30	39	41	16	0	13	13	23
2015–16	Manitoba Moose	AHL	2	0	0	0	2	—	—	—	—	—
2016–17	Torpedo Ust-Kamenogorsk	VHL	47	7	16	23	12	21	2	1	3	26
2017–18	Torpedo Ust-Kamenogorsk	VHL	14	0	3	3	2	5	0	1	1	12
2017–18	Barys Astana	KHL	23	0	4	4	13	—	—	—	—	—
2018–19	Florida Everblades	ECHL	21	2	15	17	9	—	—	—	—	—
2018–19	HC '05 Banská Bystrica	Slovak	23	4	11	15	87	16	3	9	12	22
2019–20	HC '05 Banská Bystrica	Slovak	51	13	38	51	116	—	—	—	—
2020–21	HK Dukla Michalovce	Slovak	38	8	25	33	12	9	0	4	4	0
2021–22	Orli Znojmo	ICEHL	14	2	7	9	6	—	—	—	—	—
2021–22	Dinamo Riga	KHL	9	1	3	4	2	—	—	—	—	—
2022–23	HC Košice	Slovak	47	7	28	35	31	17	1	4	5	4
2023–24	Augsburger Panther	DEL	46	5	25	30	14	—	—	—	—	—
2024–25	Brûleurs de Loups	Ligue Magnus	41	3	23	26	14	13	1	4	5	4
2025–26	Sheffield Steelers	EIHL	47	6	22	28	4	4	1	1	2	0
KHL totals			32	1	7	8	15	—	—	—	—	—
Slovak totals			159	32	104	134	246	42	4	17	21	26

== Awards and honors ==
Award	Year
Slovak
Champion	2019, 2023
IIHF
IIHF Continental Cup Silver medal	2024–25
Ligue Magnus
Champion	2025
