= Patrik Lamper =

Slovak ice hockey player (born 1993)

- Born: 10 March 1993 (age 33) Banská Bystrica, Slovakia
- Height: 184 cm (6 ft 0 in)
- Weight: 90 kg (198 lb; 14 st 2 lb)
- Position: Forward
- Shoots: Left
- Slovak team Former teams: HC Košice; HK Brezno; HC '05 Banská Bystrica; HK Orange 20; HC Slovan Bratislava; Mountfield HK; SC Kolín
- National team: Slovakia
- Playing career: 2011–present

Patrik Lamper (born 10 March 1993) is a Slovak professional ice hockey forward who currently plays for HC Košice of the Slovak Extraliga.

He also played for HC Slovan Bratislava in the Kontinental Hockey League (KHL). He was selected and competed for Slovakia in the 2018 Winter Olympics.

== Career statistics ==
=== Regular season and playoffs ===
			Regular season					Playoffs
Season	Team	League	GP	G	A	Pts	PIM	GP	G	A	Pts	PIM
2007–08	HC ’05 Banská Bystrica	SVK U18	6	1	2	3	29	—	—	—	—	—
2008–09	HC ’05 Banská Bystrica	SVK U18	52	13	14	27	65	—	—	—	—	—
2009–10	HC ’05 Banská Bystrica	SVK U18	15	10	14	24	16	—	—	—	—	—
2009–10	HC ’05 Banská Bystrica	SVK U20	31	7	5	12	16	—	—	—	—	—
2010–11	HC ’05 Banská Bystrica	SVK U18	28	14	13	27	98	—	—	—	—	—
2010–11	HC ’05 Banská Bystrica	SVK U20	9	5	7	12	8	—	—	—	—	—
2010–11	HK Brezno	SVK.2	1	0	0	0	2	—	—	—	—	—
2011–12	HC ’05 Banská Bystrica	SVK U20	15	7	10	17	34	13	5	6	11	38
2011–12	HC ’05 Banská Bystrica	SVK	12	0	1	1	4	1	0	0	0	0
2011–12	HK Orange 20	SVK	8	0	0	0	4	—	—	—	—	—
2011–12	HK Orange 20	SVK.2	9	0	2	2	33	—	—	—	—	—
2012–13	HC ’05 Banská Bystrica	SVK	39	5	9	14	63	—	—	—	—	—
2013–14	HC ’05 Banská Bystrica	SVK	42	5	12	17	22	11	0	1	1	4
2014–15	HC ’05 Banská Bystrica	SVK	42	3	4	7	33	16	1	2	3	8
2015–16	HC ’05 iClinic Banská Bystrica	SVK	49	8	11	19	30	8	1	0	1	6
2016–17	HC ’05 iClinic Banská Bystrica	SVK	39	5	5	10	14	15	2	6	8	22
2017–18	HC ’05 iClinic Banská Bystrica	SVK	42	6	9	15	36	—	—	—	—	—
2017–18	HC Slovan Bratislava	KHL	9	2	2	4	2	—	—	—	—	—
2018–19	HC Slovan Bratislava	KHL	44	5	4	9	14	—	—	—	—	—
2018–19	HC ’05 iClinic Banská Bystrica	SVK	5	2	2	4	4	13	4	1	5	12
2019–20	HC ’05 iClinic Banská Bystrica	SVK	44	11	12	23	56	—	—	—	—	—
2020–21	HC '05 Banská Bystrica	SVK	41	12	17	29	60	1	0	0	0	0
2021–22	Mountfield HK	ELH	21	2	3	5	2	—	—	—	—	—
2021–22	SC Kolín	CZE.2	1	0	0	0	0	—	—	—	—	—
2021–22	HC '05 Banská Bystrica	SVK	14	1	4	5	33	7	2	1	3	8
SVK totals			377	58	86	144	359	72	10	11	21	60

=== International ===
Year	Team	Event	Result	GP	G	A	Pts	PIM
2018	Slovakia	OG	11th	4	0	0	0	0
Senior totals				4	0	0	0	0

== Awards and honours ==
Award	Year
Slovak Extraliga
Champion	2017, 2018, 2019, 2023
