= Ville Leskinen =

Finnish ice hockey winger

- Born: 29 July 1995 (age 30) Pieksämäki, Finland
- Height: 5 ft 11 in (180 cm)
- Weight: 170 lb (77 kg; 12 st 2 lb)
- Position: Winger
- Shoots: Left
- Mestis team Former teams: Jokerit; KalPa; Jukurit; Jokipojat; Iisalmen Peli-Karhut; Imatran Ketterä; HKM Zvolen; HC Košice; SønderjyskE; HK Olimpija Ljubljana; HK Dukla Trencin
- Playing career: 2016–present

Ville Leskinen (born 29 July 1995) is a Finnish professional ice hockey winger who currently plays for Jokerit of Mestis.

Leskinen played in junior level for KalPa and Jokerit before joining Jukurit in 2016. He made his Liiga debut for Jukurit during the 2016–17 season, playing in nine games and scoring a goal and an assist.

== Career statistics ==
			Regular season					Playoffs
Season	Team	League	GP	G	A	Pts	PIM	GP	G	A	Pts	PIM
2016–17	Mikkelin Jukurit	Liiga	9	1	1	2	2	—	—	—	—	—
2017–18	Mikkelin Jukurit	Liiga	58	11	5	16	16	—	—	—	—	—
2018–19	Mikkelin Jukurit	Liiga	42	4	7	11	16	—	—	—	—	—
2019–20	Mikkelin Jukurit	Liiga	52	8	9	17	20	—	—	—	—	—
2020–21	Mikkelin Jukurit	Liiga	42	4	7	11	16	—	—	—	—	—
2021–22	HKM Zvolen	Slovak	40	15	20	35	55	11	3	8	11	6
2022–23	HC Košice	Slovak	38	11	10	21	30	8	3	2	5	0
Liiga totals			204	27	28	55	82	—	—	—	—	—
Slovak totals			78	26	30	56	85	19	6	10	16	6

== Awards and honors ==
Award	Year
Slovak
Champion	2023
