= Oldrich Kotvan =

Slovak ice hockey player

- Born: 20 July 1990 (age 35) Skalica, Czechoslovakia
- Height: 6 ft 4 in (193 cm)
- Weight: 218 lb (99 kg; 15 st 8 lb)
- Position: Defence
- Shoots: Left
- Slovak team Former teams: HK Poprad; HC Olomouc; PSG Zlín; HC Dukla Jihlava; BK Mladá Boleslav; HC Bílí Tygři Liberec; HC Energie Karlovy Vary; HKM Zvolen
- NHL draft: Undrafted
- Playing career: 2011–present

Oldrich Kotvan (born 20 July 1990) is a Slovak professional ice hockey defenseman playing for HK Poprad of the Slovak Extraliga.

== Career statistics ==
=== Regular season and playoffs ===
			Regular season					Playoffs
Season	Team	League	GP	G	A	Pts	PIM	GP	G	A	Pts	PIM
2006–07	HK Trnava	Slovak-Jr.	1	0	0	0	0	—	—	—	—	—
2007–08	HK Trnava	Slovak-Jr.	10	0	1	1	6	—	—	—	—	—
2008–09	HK Trnava	Slovak-Jr.	45	1	8	9	24	—	—	—	—	—
2009–10	Elliot Lake Bobcats	GMHL	2	0	0	0	0	—	—	—	—	—
2009–10	HK Trnava	Slovak-Jr.	48	20	18	38	80	—	—	—	—	—
2010–11	Fargo Force	USHL	3	0	0	0	2	—	—	—	—	—
2010–11	Fairbanks Ice Dogs	NAHL	16	1	3	4	67	—	—	—	—	—
2011–12	HC Olomouc	Czech.1	48	0	5	5	38	12	2	1	3	4
2012–13	PSG Zlín	Czech	19	0	2	2	20	2	0	0	0	4
2012–13	HC Olomouc	Czech.1	11	3	4	7	0	—	—	—	—	—
2013–14	PSG Zlín	Czech	13	0	2	2	12	15	2	3	5	22
2013–14	HC Dukla Jihlava	Czech.1	20	0	7	7	8	—	—	—	—	—
2014–15	PSG Zlín	Czech	45	6	12	18	32	7	1	0	1	12
2015–16	PSG Zlín	Czech	50	8	7	15	20	10	2	2	4	4
2016–17	PSG Zlín	Czech	50	8	12	20	62	—	—	—	—	—
2017–18	BK Mladá Boleslav	Czech	44	4	20	24	26	—	—	—	—	—
2018–19	BK Mladá Boleslav	Czech	44	3	14	17	10	8	0	6	6	2
2019–20	HC Bílí Tygři Liberec	Czech	31	5	7	12	6	—	—	—	—	—
2020–21	HC Energie Karlovy Vary	Czech	5	0	1	1	10	—	—	—	—	—
2020–21	HKM Zvolen	Slovak	20	1	5	6	12	14	1	3	4	14
2021–22	HKM Zvolen	Slovak	49	5	25	30	69	11	2	2	4	6
2022–23	HK Poprad	Slovak	45	9	16	25	42	2	0	0	0	4
Czech totals			301	34	77	111	198	42	5	11	16	44

== Awards and honors ==
Award	Year
Czech
Champion	2014
Slovak
Champion	2021
