= Peter Ordzovenský =

Slovak ice hockey defenceman

- Born: 1 November 1985 (age 39); Spišská Nová Ves, Czechoslovakia
- Height: 5 ft 10 in (178 cm)
- Weight: 190 lb (86 kg; 13 st 8 lb)
- Position: Defence
- Shoots: Left
- team Former teams: Free agent HK Spišská Nová Ves; HSC Csíkszereda; HK Nitra; HC Nové Zámky
- Playing career: 2003–present

Peter Ordzovenský (born 1 November 1985) is a Slovak professional ice hockey defenceman. He is currently a free agent.

== Career ==
Ordzovenský began his career with HK Spišská Nová Ves, playing in their various Jr. teams between 2003 and 2005. After that he played for their senior team.

Ordzovenský previously played for HSC Csíkszereda, HK Nitra and HC Nové Zámky.

== Career statistics ==
=== Regular season and playoffs ===
			Regular season					Playoffs
Season	Team	League	GP	G	A	Pts	PIM	GP	G	A	Pts	PIM
