= 2020–21 Slovak 1. Liga season =

- League: (Slovakia) Slovak 1. Liga
- Sport: Ice hockey
- Duration: October 2020 – March 2021; (Regular season)
- Teams: 11

Regular season
- League Champion: Vlci Žilina
- Top scorer: Patrik Koyš (Žilina); (53 points)

Playoffs
- Finals champions: HK Spišská Nová Ves
- Runners-up: Vlci Žilina

Slovak 1. Liga seasons
- 2019–20 2021–22

The 2020–21 Slovak 1. Liga season was the 28th season of the Slovak 1. Liga, the second level of ice hockey in Slovakia.

== Regular season ==
=== Standings ===
Each team played 38 games: playing each of the other nine teams four times – 2x at home, 2x away (36 games). At the end of the regular season, the team that finished with the most points was crowned the league champion. Each 1HL team played two matches with SR 18 (1x at home and 1x outside) to support the preparation of the SR team for MS U18, I. div. sk. A 2021.

Pos	Team	Pld	W	OTW	OTL	L	GF	GA	GD	Pts	Qualification
1	Žilina	38	31	2	1	4	183	66	+117	98	Qualification to Quarter-finals
2	Martin	38	23	2	1	12	139	107	+32	74	Qualification to Quarter-finals
3	Spišská Nová Ves	38	21	4	2	11	120	99	+21	73	Qualification to Quarter-finals
4	Topoľčany	38	18	3	4	13	124	106	+18	64	Qualification to Quarter-finals
5	Dubnica	38	19	0	4	15	126	115	+11	61	Qualification to Quarter-finals
6	Levice	38	13	3	5	17	109	120	−11	50	Qualification to Quarter-finals
7	Humenné	38	13	2	5	18	101	130	−29	48	Qualification to Quarter-finals
8	Považská Bystrica	38	11	6	0	21	101	140	−39	45	Qualification to Quarter-finals
9	Skalica	38	12	1	5	20	108	126	−18	43	
10	Trnava	38	10	1	0	27	98	148	−50	32	
	SR 18	20	2	3	0	15	50	102	−52	12	

Source: Slovenská hokejová liga
Rules for classification: 1) Points; 2) Head-to-head points

== Playoffs ==
Eight teams qualify for the playoffs.

=== Bracket ===
Quarter-finals (best-of-7)
1	Žilina	4
8	Považská Bystrica	0
4	Topoľčany	0
5	Dubnica	4
(Pairings are reseeded after the first round)
2	Martin	4
7	Humenné	0
3	Spišská Nová Ves	4
6	Levice	0

Semi-finals (best-of-7)
1	Žilina	4
5	Dubnica	0
2	Martin	2
3	Spišská Nová Ves	4

Finals (best-of-7)
1	Žilina	1
3	Spišská Nová Ves	4

=== Quarterfinals ===
Žilina – Považská Bystrica 4-0
10.3.2021	Žilina	Považská Bystrica	3-2 SO
11.3.2021	Žilina	Považská Bystrica	9-1
14.3.2021	Považská Bystrica	Žilina	1-2
15.3.2021	Považská Bystrica	Žilina	1-2 OT1
Žilina wins the series 4-0.

Spišská Nová Ves – Levice 4-0
10.3.2021	Spišská Nová Ves	Levice	4-0
11.3.2021	Spišská Nová Ves	Levice	4-0
14.3.2021	Levice	Spišská Nová Ves	0-5
15.3.2021	Levice	Spišská Nová Ves	2-5
Spišská Nová Ves wins the series 4-0.

Martin – Humenné 4-0
10.3.2021	Martin	Humenné	4-0
11.3.2021	Martin	Humenné	3-1
14.3.2021	Humenné	Martin	1-2
15.3.2021	Humenné	Martin	2-5
Martin wins the series 4-0.

Topoľčany – Dubnica 0-4
10.3.2021	Topoľčany	Dubnica	1-2
11.3.2021	Topoľčany	Dubnica	2-4
14.3.2021	Dubnica	Topoľčany	3-1
15.3.2021	Dubnica	Topoľčany	6-3
Dubnica wins the series 4-0.

=== Semifinals ===
Žilina – Dubnica 4-0
24.3.2021	Žilina	Dubnica	3-2 SO
25.3.2021	Žilina	Dubnica	4-3
28.3.2021	Dubnica	Žilina	2-3 OT1
29.3.2021	Dubnica	Žilina	1-4
Žilina wins the series 4-0.

Martin – Spišská Nová Ves 2-4
24.3.2021	Martin	Spišská Nová Ves	2-6
25.3.2021	Martin	Spišská Nová Ves	2-1 OT1
28.3.2021	Spišská Nová Ves	Martin	2-5
29.3.2021	Spišská Nová Ves	Martin	2-0
1.4.2021	Martin	Spišská Nová Ves	1-3
3.4.2021	Spišská Nová Ves	Martin	4-1
Spišská Nová Ves wins the series 4-2.

=== Finals ===
8 April 2021; 17:30	Žilina	3–4 (0–2, 2–0, 1–2) score in the series: 0–1	Spišská Nová Ves	Vojtech Závodský Ice Arena, Žilina

Game reference

Patrik Romančík
Maroš Mikoláš
Goalies
Marcel Melicherčík

	0–1	00:50 – Hvila (Tyczyński)
	0–2	14:53 – Rapáč (Hančák, Tyczyński)
Jurčík (Jaborník, Koyš) – 22:24	1–2
Cíger (Dubeň) – 22:56	2–2
Petráš (Urban, Mikula) (PP) – 44:12	3–2
	3–3	44:25 – Rapáč (Hvila, Fabian)
	3–4	44:49 – Džugan (Giľák, Dow)

22 min
Penalties
26 min
37
Shots
33

9 April 2021; 17:30	Žilina	3–5 (0–3, 3–1, 0–1) score in the series: 0–2	Spišská Nová Ves	Vojtech Závodský Ice Arena, Žilina

Game reference
Maroš Mikoláš	Goalies	Marcel Melicherčík
41 min	Penalties	14 min
49	Shots	24

12 April 2021; 18:00	Spišská Nová Ves	1–5 (0–3, 1–0, 0–2) score in the series: 2–1	Žilina	Spiš Aréna, Spišská Nová Ves

Game reference
Marcel Melicherčík	Goalies	Maroš Mikoláš
18 min	Penalties	12 min
28	Shots	34

13 April 2021; 18:00	Spišská Nová Ves	1–0 (0–0, 1–0, 0–0) score in the series: 3–1	Žilina	Spiš Aréna, Spišská Nová Ves

Game reference
Marcel Melicherčík	Goalies	Maroš Mikoláš
Tyczyński (Rapáč, Hvila) – 24:34 / 1–0
10 min	Penalties	10 min
28	Shots	39

16 April 2021; 17:30	Žilina	3–4 GWS (1–1, 1–1, 1–1) (OT: 0–0) (SO: 0–1) score in the series: 1–4	Spišská Nová Ves	Vojtech Závodský Ice Arena, Žilina

Game reference

Spišská Nová Ves wins the finals 4-1.

== Final rankings ==
Gold medal	Spišská Nová Ves
Silver medal	Žilina
Bronze medal	Martin
4	Dubnica
5	Topoľčany
6	Levice
7	Humenné
8	Považská Bystrica
9	Skalica
10	Trnava
	SR 18
