= Rona Cup =

- Sport: Ice Hockey
- Founded: 1994
- No. of teams: 6 (matches)
- Countries: Slovakia (usually HK Dukla Trenčín), Czech Republic, various other European countries
- Venues: Pavol Demitra Ice Stadium (Trenčín, Slovakia)
- Most recent champions: (Czech Republic) HC Oceláři Třinec (4th title)
- Most titles: (Czech Republic) HC Oceláři Třinec (4) (Slovakia) HK Dukla Trenčín (4) (Slovakia) HC Košice (4)
- Qualification: Invitation only

The Rona Cup is an annual ice hockey tournament held in Trenčín, Slovakia. The first installment of the Rona Cup was in 1994.

== Rona Cup winners ==
Season/Year	Type	Winner
1994	international	(Slovakia) HK Dukla Trenčín
1995	international	(Slovakia) HC Košice
1996	international	(Slovakia) HC Košice
1997	international	(Czech Republic) VHK Vsetín
1998	international	(Slovakia) HC Slovan Bratislava
1999	international	(Czech Republic) HC Oceláři Třinec
2000	international	(Czech Republic) HC Oceláři Třinec
2001	international	(Slovakia) HKm Zvolen
2002	international	(Slovakia) HK Dukla Trenčín
2003	international	(Slovakia) HK Dukla Trenčín
2004	international	(Czech Republic) HC Oceláři Třinec
2005	international	(Czech Republic) PSG Zlín
2006	international	(Slovakia) MsHK Žilina
2007	international	(Slovakia) HK Dukla Trenčín
2008	international	(Slovakia) HKm Zvolen
2009	international	(Slovakia) HC Košice
2010	international	(Slovakia) HK Nitra
2011	international	(Czech Republic) PSG Zlín
2012	international	(Slovakia) HK Skalica
2013	international	(Slovakia) HC Košice
2014	international	(Czech Republic) HC Kometa Brno
2015	international	(Czech Republic) PSG Zlín
2016	Tournament not held because reconstruction stadium	
2017	international	(Czech Republic) HC Oceláři Třinec
2018	Tournament not held	

== Performances ==
=== By club (international tournaments) ===
Club	Won	Years won
(Slovakia) HC Košice	4	1995, 1996, 2009, 2013
(Slovakia) HK Dukla Trenčín	4	1994, 2002, 2003, 2007
(Czech Republic) HC Oceláři Třinec	4	1999, 2000, 2004, 2017
(Czech Republic) PSG Zlín	3	2005, 2011, 2015
(Slovakia) HKm Zvolen	2	2001, 2008
(Czech Republic) VHK Vsetín	1	1997
(Slovakia) HC Slovan Bratislava	1	1998
(Slovakia) MsHK Žilina	1	2006
(Slovakia) HK Nitra	1	2010
(Slovakia) HK Skalica	1	2012
(Czech Republic) HC Kometa Brno	1	2014

=== By country (international tournaments) ===
Nation	Winners
Slovakia	14
Czech Republic	9

== See also ==
- Pitsiturnaus
- Nations Cup (women's ice hockey)
- Karjala Tournament
- European Trophy Junior
- Rudé Právo Cup
- Tampere Cup
- Tatra Cup
- Thayer Tutt Trophy
