= Stanislav Jasečko =

Slovak ice hockey player

- Born: 5 December 1972 (age 52) Spišská Nová Ves, Czechoslovakia
- Height: 6 ft 3 in (191 cm)
- Weight: 209 lb (95 kg; 14 st 13 lb)
- Position: Defence
- Shot: Right
- Played for: SVK; HK Spišská Nová Ves; HC Košice; HKm Zvolen; HK SKP Poprad; CZE; HC České Budějovice; HC Vitkovice Steel; HC Lasselsberger Plzeň; SWE; HV71; SM-liiga; Porin Ässät; RUS; Neftekhimik Nizhnekamsk; IHL; Grand Rapids Griffins; GER; EV Duisburg; ČSFR; HK SKP Poprad
- National team: Slovakia
- Playing career: 1992–2015

Stanislav Jasečko (born 5 December 1972) is a Slovak former professional ice hockey defenceman.

During his career, Jasečko played in the Czech Extraliga for HC České Budějovice, HC Vitkovice Steel and HC Lasselsberger Plzeň, the Swedish Elitserien for HV71, the Finnish SM-liiga for Porin Ässät, the Russian Superleague for Neftekhimik Nizhnekamsk and the International Hockey League for the Grand Rapids Griffins. He also played for the Slovakia men's national ice hockey team in the 1998 Winter Olympics.

== Career statistics ==
=== Regular season and playoffs ===
| | | | Regular season | | | | | Playoffs |
| Season | Team | League | GP | G | A | Pts | PIM | GP | G | A | Pts | PIM |
|---|---|---|---|---|---|---|---|---|---|---|---|---|
| 1990–91 | Štart Spišská Nová Ves | SVK.2 | — | 0 | — | — | — | — | — | — | — | — |
| 1991–92 | Štart Spišská Nová Ves | SVK.2 | — | — | — | — | — | — | — | — | — | — |
| 1992–93 | TJ ŠKP PS Poprad | TCH | 43 | 0 | 7 | 7 | 0 | — | — | — | — | — |
| 1993–94 | HK VTJ Spišská Nová Ves | SVK | 36 | 4 | 9 | 13 | — | — | — | — | — | — |
| 1994–95 | HC Košice | SVK | 36 | 5 | 10 | 15 | 34 | 9 | 0 | 1 | 1 | 8 |
| 1995–96 | HC Košice | SVK | 50 | 8 | 12 | 20 | 40 | — | — | — | — | — |
| 1996–97 | Grand Rapids Griffins | IHL | 62 | 3 | 15 | 18 | 48 | — | — | — | — | — |
| 1997–98 | HC Košice | SVK | 46 | 10 | 15 | 25 | 34 | — | — | — | — | — |
| 1998–99 | HC VSŽ Košice | SVK | 42 | 11 | 16 | 27 | — | 10 | 1 | 3 | 4 | — |
| 1999–2000 | HC České Budějovice | ELH | 52 | 7 | 14 | 21 | 85 | 3 | 0 | 0 | 0 | 31 |
| 2000–01 | HC České Budějovice | ELH | 50 | 5 | 14 | 19 | 94 | — | — | — | — | — |
| 2001–02 | HV71 | SEL | 8 | 0 | 4 | 4 | 14 | 8 | 0 | 2 | 2 | 16 |
| 2001–02 | Ässät | SM-l | 41 | 8 | 11 | 19 | 30 | — | — | — | — | — |
| 2002–03 | Neftekhimik Nizhnekamsk | RSL | 12 | 0 | 3 | 3 | 28 | — | — | — | — | — |
| 2002–03 | HC České Budějovice | ELH | 34 | 6 | 9 | 15 | 61 | 4 | 0 | 0 | 0 | 6 |
| 2003–04 | HC České Budějovice | ELH | 51 | 5 | 22 | 27 | 68 | — | — | — | — | — |
| 2004–05 | HKM Zvolen | SVK | 54 | 12 | 19 | 31 | 59 | 17 | 0 | 5 | 5 | 18 |
| 2005–06 | HKM Zvolen | SVK | 3 | 0 | 0 | 0 | 2 | — | — | — | — | — |
| 2005–06 | HC Vítkovice Steel | ELH | 47 | 2 | 15 | 17 | 36 | 6 | 1 | 0 | 1 | 8 |
| 2006–07 | HC Vítkovice Steel | ELH | 50 | 6 | 5 | 11 | 62 | — | — | — | — | — |
| 2007–08 | HC Lasselsberger Plzeň | ELH | 52 | 3 | 6 | 9 | 62 | 2 | 0 | 0 | 0 | 2 |
| 2008–09 | Füchse Duisburg | DEL | 47 | 3 | 13 | 16 | 50 | — | — | — | — | — |
| 2009–10 | HK Aquacity ŠKP Poprad | SVK | 45 | 2 | 21 | 23 | 46 | 5 | 0 | 0 | 0 | 10 |
| 2010–11 | HK Poprad | SVK | 53 | 5 | 18 | 23 | 36 | 18 | 1 | 4 | 5 | 10 |
| 2011–12 | EV Bozen 84 | ITA.2 | 33 | 9 | 22 | 31 | 24 | — | — | — | — | — |
| 2011–12 | Frederikshavn White Hawks | DNK | 6 | 0 | 4 | 4 | 8 | 4 | 0 | 1 | 1 | 0 |
| 2012–13 | EV Bozen 84 | ITA.2 | 32 | 9 | 26 | 35 | 22 | — | — | — | — | — |
| 2012–13 | Dresdner Eislöwen | DEU.2 | 6 | 0 | 1 | 1 | 4 | — | — | — | — | — |
| 2013–14 | KLH Vajgar Jindřichův Hradec | CZE.3 | 32 | 7 | 28 | 35 | 26 | 3 | 0 | 1 | 1 | 32 |
| 2014–15 | KLH Vajgar Jindřichův Hradec | CZE.3 | 8 | 1 | 3 | 4 | 10 | — | — | — | — | — |
| SVK totals | | | 365 | 57 | 120 | 177 | 251 | 59 | 2 | 13 | 15 | 46 |
| ELH totals | | | 336 | 34 | 85 | 119 | 468 | 15 | 1 | 0 | 1 | 47 |

=== International ===
| Year | Team | Event | GP | G | A | Pts | PIM |
|---|---|---|---|---|---|---|---|
| 1994 | Slovakia | WC C | 4 | 0 | 0 | 0 | 0 |
| 1995 | Slovakia | WC B | 7 | 0 | 3 | 3 | 6 |
| 1996 | Slovakia | WC | 5 | 0 | 1 | 1 | 4 |
| 1996 | Slovakia | WCH | 1 | 0 | 0 | 0 | 2 |
| 1998 | Slovakia | OG | 4 | 0 | 0 | 0 | 4 |
| 1998 | Slovakia | WC | 6 | 0 | 0 | 0 | 4 |
| 1999 | Slovakia | WC | 6 | 0 | 1 | 1 | 4 |
| 2000 | Slovakia | WC | 9 | 0 | 0 | 0 | 6 |
| Senior totals | | | 42 | 0 | 5 | 5 | 30 |
