= Ľubomír Vaic =

Slovak ice hockey player

- Born: 6 March 1977 (age 49) Spišská Nová Ves, Czechoslovakia
- Height: 5 ft 9 in (175 cm)
- Weight: 178 lb (81 kg; 12 st 10 lb)
- Position: Centre
- Shot: Left
- Played for: HC Bílí Tygři Liberec; Vancouver Canucks
- National team: Slovakia
- NHL draft: 227th overall, 1996; Vancouver Canucks
- Playing career: 1997–2017

Ľubomír Vaic (born 6 March 1977) is a Slovak former professional ice hockey player who spent most of his career in the Slovak Extraliga. After several years in Slovakia Vaic joined the Vancouver Canucks in 1997-98 and played 9 games for them over two seasons. He returned to Europe in 2000 and continued to play in various leagues before retiring in 2017. Internationally Vaic played for the Slovak national team at several tournaments at both the junior and senior level and won a bronze medal at the 2003 World Championship.

== Biography ==
As a youth, Vaic played in the 1991 Quebec International Pee-Wee Hockey Tournament with a minor ice hockey team from Poprad.

Drafted by the Canucks 227th overall in the 1996 NHL entry draft, Vaic came to North America a year later. He scored 27 points in 50 games for the Syracuse Crunch, Vancouver's AHL affiliate. He also earned a 5-game call-up to the Canucks, where he scored his only NHL goal, and added an assist.

Vaic returned to Slovakia for another year before returning to the Canucks organization for the 1999–2000 season. However, he would find himself in much the same situation, scoring 42 points in 63 games for Syracuse, and being held pointless in 4 NHL games in Vancouver. Following the season he returned to Europe, signing with Eisbären Berlin.

Vaic became something of a nomad, appearing with five clubs in five different major European leagues over the next five seasons. He was, however, a consistent offensive performer, and helped Metallurg Magnitogorsk to the Russian league championship in 2003–04. He would finally find a long-term home in the Czech Extraliga, after signing with HC Bílí Tygři Liberec in 2004. In 2005–06, he finished 2nd in scoring in the Extraliga and helped Liberec to the league championship. At the end of the 2006–07 season he joined HC Sparta Prague.

Vaic has appeared in 9 NHL games, recording a goal and an assist for two points. He has also represented Slovakia at three World Championships, winning a silver medal in 2000 and a bronze medal in 2003.

== Career statistics ==
Medal record

Representing Slovakia

Ice hockey

World Championships
Silver medal – second place	2000 Russia	
Bronze medal – third place	2003 Finland	

=== Regular season and playoffs ===
			Regular season					Playoffs
Season	Team	League	GP	G	A	Pts	PIM	GP	G	A	Pts	PIM
1993–94	ŠKP Poprad	SVK	28	10	6	16	10	—	—	—	—	—
1994–95	ŠKP Poprad	SVK	20	5	4	9	2	—	—	—	—	—
1995–96	Košice	SVK	49	7	26	33	16	—	—	—	—	—
1995–96	VTJ Spišská Nová Ves	SVK-2	2	0	2	2	4	—	—	—	—	—
1996–97	Košice	SVK	43	15	12	27	28	—	—	—	—	—
1997–98	Vancouver Canucks	NHL	5	1	1	2	2	—	—	—	—	—
1997–98	Syracuse Crunch	AHL	50	12	15	27	22	3	0	0	0	4
1998–99	Košice	SVK	46	22	25	47	50	—	—	—	—	—
1999–00	Vancouver Canucks	NHL	4	0	0	0	0	—	—	—	—	—
1999–00	Syracuse Crunch	AHL	63	13	29	42	42	4	0	3	3	8
2000–01	Eisbären Berlin	DEL	26	1	6	7	70	—	—	—	—	—
2001–02	Vsetín	CZE	34	10	18	28	28	—	—	—	—	—
2001–02	SaiPa	FIN	22	7	4	11	30	—	—	—	—	—
2002–03	SaiPa	FIN	56	16	23	39	28	—	—	—	—	—
2003–04	Metallurg Magnitogorsk	RUS	49	12	14	26	24	12	2	3	5	16
2004–05	Bílí Tygři Liberec	CZE	51	13	14	27	62	12	4	5	9	12
2005–06	Bílí Tygři Liberec	CZE	52	20	32	52	101	5	0	4	4	6
2006–07	Bílí Tygři Liberec	CZE	45	9	9	18	48	7	1	1	2	6
2007–08	Sparta Prague	CZE	52	10	9	19	69	4	0	0	0	0
2008–09	Slovan Bratislava	SVK	55	14	37	51	40	12	2	7	9	16
2009–10	Slovan Bratislava	SVK	46	15	39	54	30	15	5	14	19	20
2010–11	Slovan Bratislava	SVK	33	11	12	23	43	—	—	—	—	—
2010–11	VIK Västerås	SWE-2	12	5	6	11	8	—	—	—	—	—
2011–12	Poprad	SVK	54	18	33	51	59	6	1	3	4	6
2012–13	Spišská Nová Ves	SVK-2	30	20	20	40	40	—	—	—	—	—
2012–13	Poprad	SVK	25	7	12	19	37	7	0	2	2	27
2013–14	Poprad	SVK	24	6	6	12	4	5	0	2	2	2
2013–14	Spišská Nová Ves	SVK-2	1	0	1	1	2	—	—	—	—	—
2014–15	Spišská Nová Ves	SVK-2	42	13	33	46	69	13	6	8	14	10
2016–17	Spišská Nová Ves	SVK-2	43	13	28	41	88	3	1	1	2	2
SVK totals			423	130	212	342	319	45	8	28	36	71
NHL totals			9	1	1	2	2	—	—	—	—	—

=== International ===
Year	Team	Event	GP	G	A	Pts	PIM
1994	Slovakia	EJC-C	6	10	6	16	20
1994	Slovakia	WJC-C	4	3	2	5	2
1995	Slovakia	EJC-B	5	6	10	16	4
1996	Slovakia	WJC	6	2	4	6	25
1997	Slovakia	WJC	6	1	7	8	10
2000	Slovakia	WC	9	0	3	3	4
2003	Slovakia	WC	6	0	1	1	0
2006	Slovakia	WC	7	0	0	0	2
Junior totals			27	22	29	51	61
Senior totals			22	0	4	4	6
