= James Livingston (ice hockey) =

Canadian ice hockey player

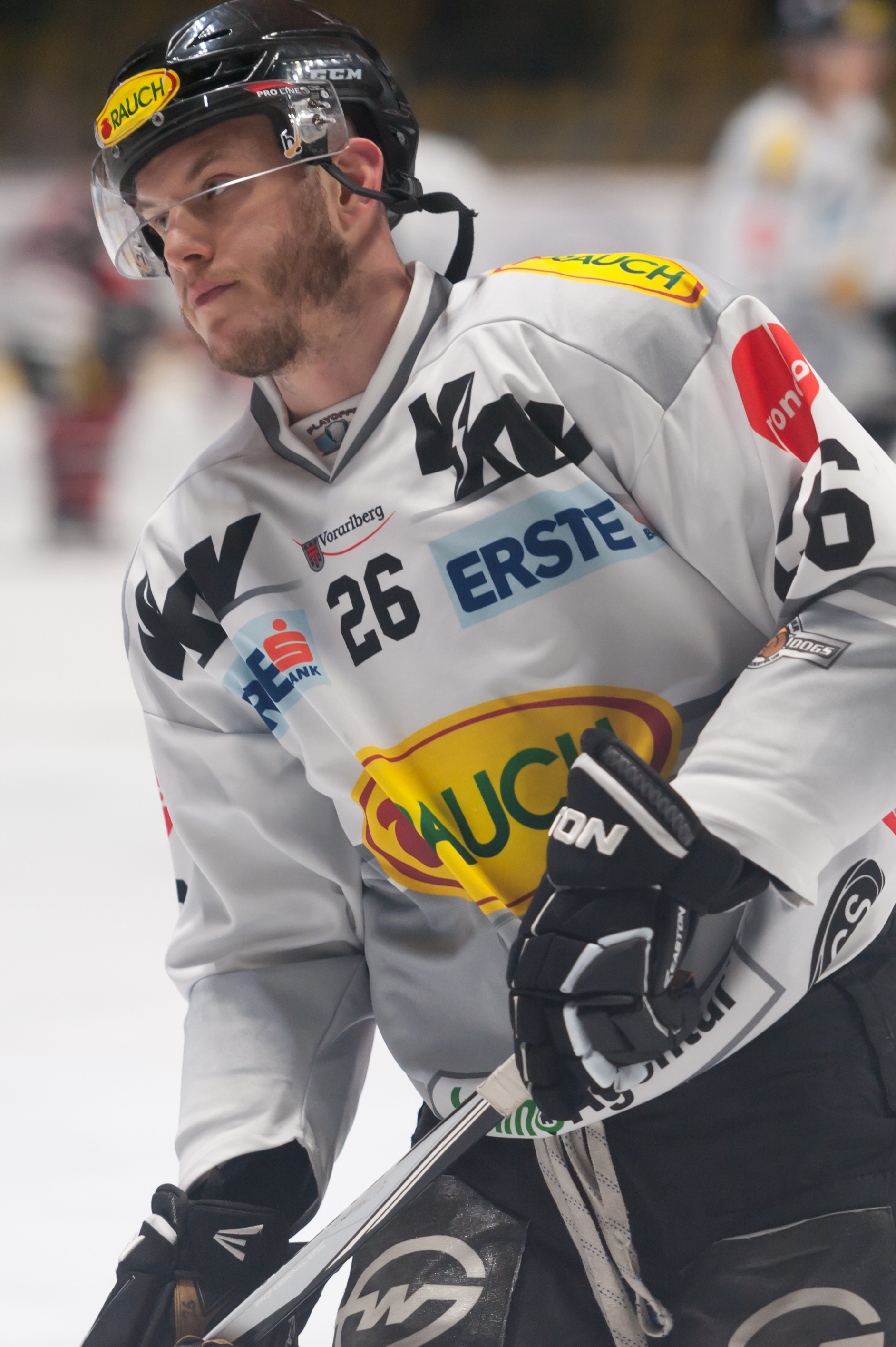
- Livingston with Dornbirner EC in 2016
- Born: March 8, 1990 (age 36) Halifax, Nova Scotia, Canada
- Height: 6 ft 1 in (185 cm)
- Weight: 192 lb (87 kg; 13 st 10 lb)
- Position: Right wing
- Shoots: Right
- AlpsHL team Former teams: Wipptal Broncos; Worcester Sharks; Manchester Monarchs; Springfield Falcons; Dornbirner EC; EC Bad Nauheim; Cardiff Devils; Fife Flyers; HK Poprad; Graz 99ers Rungsted Ishockey Klub
- NHL draft: 70th overall, 2008; St. Louis Blues
- Playing career: 2011–present

James Livingston (born March 8, 1990) is a Canadian professional ice hockey player who plays for the Wipptal Broncos of the Alps Hockey League (AlpsHL).

He previously played with EC Bad Nauheim of the DEL2 and UK EIHL side Cardiff Devils. Livingston was selected by the St. Louis Blues in the 3rd round (70th overall) of the 2008 NHL entry draft.

== Playing career ==
Livingston played five seasons (2006–2011) of major junior hockey in the Ontario Hockey League (OHL) where he scored 82 goals and 91 assists for 173 points in 316 games played. In 2008 Livingston was selected to play in the CHL Top Prospects Game.

On March 11, 2011, the San Jose Sharks of the National Hockey League signed Livingston as a free agent to an entry-level contract. Livingston made his professional debut in the American Hockey League with the Worcester Sharks during the 2011–12 season.

In the final year of his contract with the Sharks, and his third season with Worcester, at the 2013–14 trade deadline he was traded to the Los Angeles Kings for a conditional draft pick on March 5, 2014. He was immediately assigned to AHL affiliate, the Manchester Monarchs for the remainder of the season.

On September 23, 2014, unable to attain NHL interest, Livingston was signed to a standard player contract with the Idaho Steelheads of the ECHL.

On July 3, 2015, Livingston decided to pursue a European career, signing a one-year contract with Austrian club, Dornbirner EC of the EBEL.

After a spell in DEL2 with EC Bad Nauheim, Livingston moved to the UK Elite Ice Hockey League to sign for Cardiff Devils in January 2019. He departed at the end of the 2018-19 season.

On August 9, 2019, Livingston penned a one-year deal with Cardiff's EIHL counterparts Fife Flyers, whom he would go on to captain.

On October 12, 2020, Livingston moved to Slovakia to sign for HK Poprad.

== Career statistics ==
=== Regular season and playoffs ===
			Regular season					Playoffs
Season	Team	League	GP	G	A	Pts	PIM	GP	G	A	Pts	PIM
2005–06	Newmarket Hurricanes	OPJHL	1	0	0	0	0	—	—	—	—	—
2006–07	Sault Ste. Marie Greyhounds	OHL	60	2	5	7	95	13	1	0	1	15
2007–08	Sault Ste. Marie Greyhounds	OHL	68	21	23	44	135	14	2	3	5	14
2008–09	Sault Ste. Marie Greyhounds	OHL	66	20	17	37	98	—	—	—	—	—
2009–10	Sault Ste. Marie Greyhounds	OHL	36	14	12	26	47	—	—	—	—	—
2009–10	Plymouth Whalers	OHL	24	3	6	9	57	9	1	1	2	6
2010–11	Plymouth Whalers	OHL	62	22	28	50	52	11	4	1	5	8
2011–12	Worcester Sharks	AHL	68	6	14	20	47	—	—	—	—	—
2012–13	Worcester Sharks	AHL	67	7	14	21	78	—	—	—	—	—
2013–14	Worcester Sharks	AHL	53	4	11	15	22	—	—	—	—	—
2013–14	Manchester Monarchs	AHL	14	4	4	8	9	4	0	0	0	0
2014–15	Idaho Steelheads	ECHL	55	13	21	34	69	5	1	1	2	4
2014–15	Springfield Falcons	AHL	6	0	0	0	0	—	—	—	—	—
2015–16	Dornbirner EC	EBEL	54	13	14	27	40	6	2	1	3	0
2016–17	Dornbirner EC	EBEL	51	10	19	29	70	—	—	—	—	—
2017–18	EC Bad Nauheim	DEL2	52	15	35	50	97	5	1	0	1	18
2018–19	EC Bad Nauheim	DEL2	25	5	13	18	22	—	—	—	—	—
2018–19	Cardiff Devils	EIHL	21	2	4	6	4	4	0	2	2	29
2019–20	Fife Flyers	EIHL	49	8	18	26	21	—	—	—	—	—
2020–21	HK Poprad	Slovak	47	12	21	33	24	15	5	5	10	16
2021–22	HK Poprad	Slovak	50	16	24	40	47	7	1	1	2	2
AHL totals			208	21	43	64	156	4	0	0	0	0
