= Lukáš Vartovník =

Slovak ice hockey defenceman

- Born: 8 March 1989 (age 37) Gelnica, Czechoslovakia
- Height: 6 ft 0 in (183 cm)
- Weight: 185 lb (84 kg; 13 st 3 lb)
- Position: Centre
- Shoots: Left
- Slovak team Former teams: HK Spišská Nová Ves; HC Zlín; Everett Silvertips; HC '05 Banská Bystrica; HK Brezno; MHC Martin; HC Prešov; MHk 32 Liptovský Mikuláš; MHK Humenné; HK Poprad
- Playing career: 2008–present

Lukáš Vartovník (born 8 March 1989) is a Slovak professional ice hockey centre currently playing for HK Spišská Nová Ves of the Slovak Extraliga.

== Career ==
Vartovník began his career with HC Zlín, playing in their various Jr. teams in 2006. After that he played for Everett Silvertips of Western Hockey League.

Vartovník previously played for HC '05 Banská Bystrica, HK Brezno, MHC Martin, HC Prešov, MHk 32 Liptovský Mikuláš, MHK Humenné and HK Poprad.

== Career statistics ==
=== Regular season and playoffs ===
			Regular season					Playoffs
Season	Team	League	GP	G	A	Pts	PIM	GP	G	A	Pts	PIM
