= Marcel Melicherčík =

Slovak ice hockey player

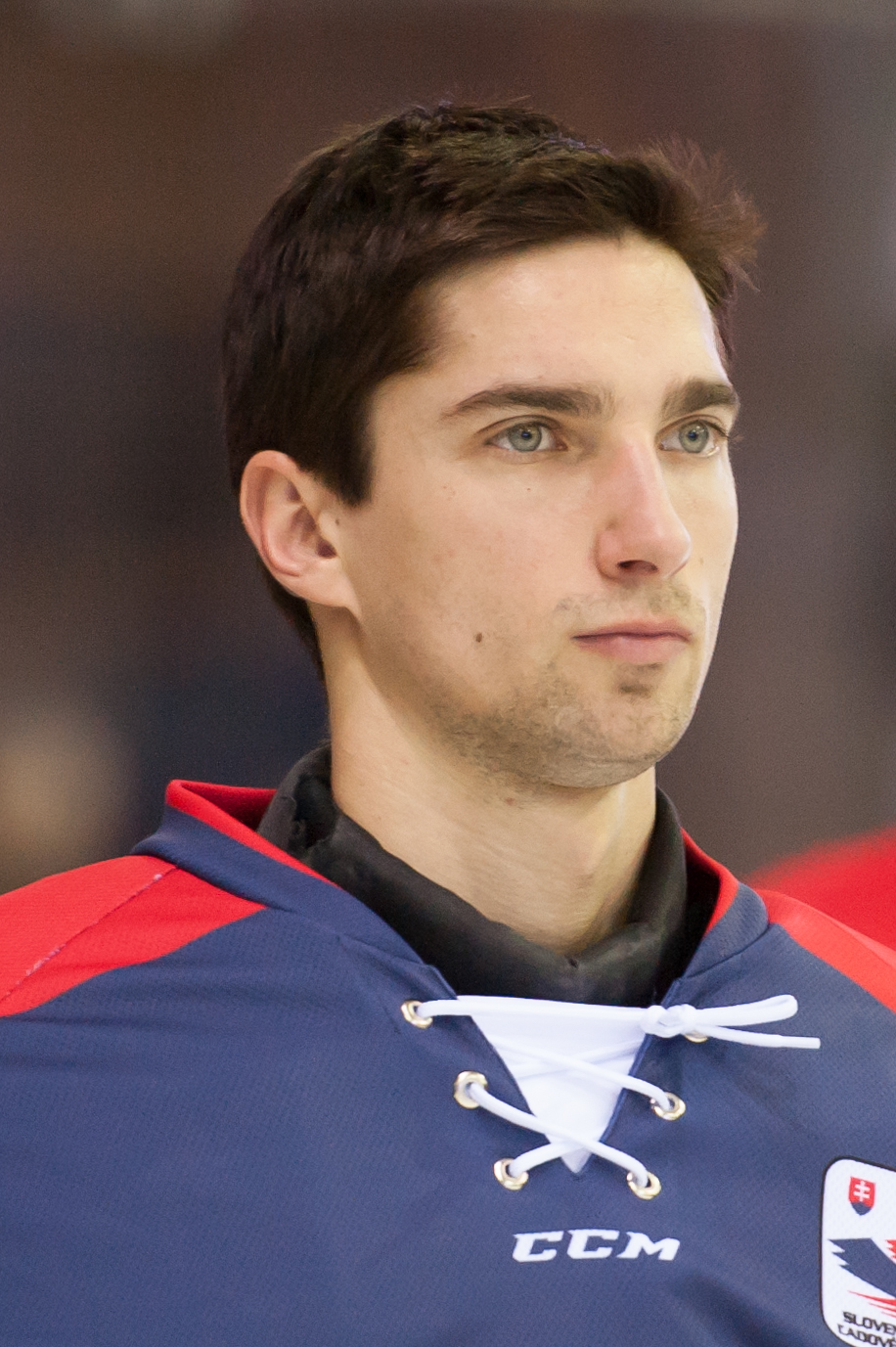
- Marcel Melicherčík 2015
- Born: December 20, 1986 (age 39) Poprad, Czechoslovakia
- Height: 6 ft 2 in (188 cm)
- Weight: 176 lb (80 kg; 12 st 8 lb)
- Position: Goaltender
- Catches: Left
- Slovak team Former teams: HK Spišská Nová Ves; HK Poprad; MHK Kežmarok; HC Lev Praha; HC Sparta Praha; HC Stadion Litoměřice; HC Bílí Tygři Liberec; HC Benátky nad Jizerou; HC Košice; HC Bolzano; Heilbronner Falken; EC Kassel Huskies; Grizzlys Wolfsburg; HC '05 Banská Bystrica
- Playing career: 2006–present

Marcel Melicherčík (born December 20, 1986) is a Slovak professional ice hockey goaltender who currently plays for HK Spišská Nová Ves of the Slovak Extraliga.

== Career ==
He first played professionally in his native land with HK Poprad in the Slovak Extraliga during the 2006–07 season. Melicherčík previously played for HC Bílí Tygři Liberec of the Czech Extraliga (ELH).

== Career statistics ==
=== Regular season and playoffs ===
			Regular season										Playoffs
Season	Team	League	GP	W	L	T	OTL	MIN	GA	SO	GAA	SV%	GP	W	L	MIN	GA	SO	GAA	SV%
