= Michal Ivan =

Slovak ice hockey player (born 1999)

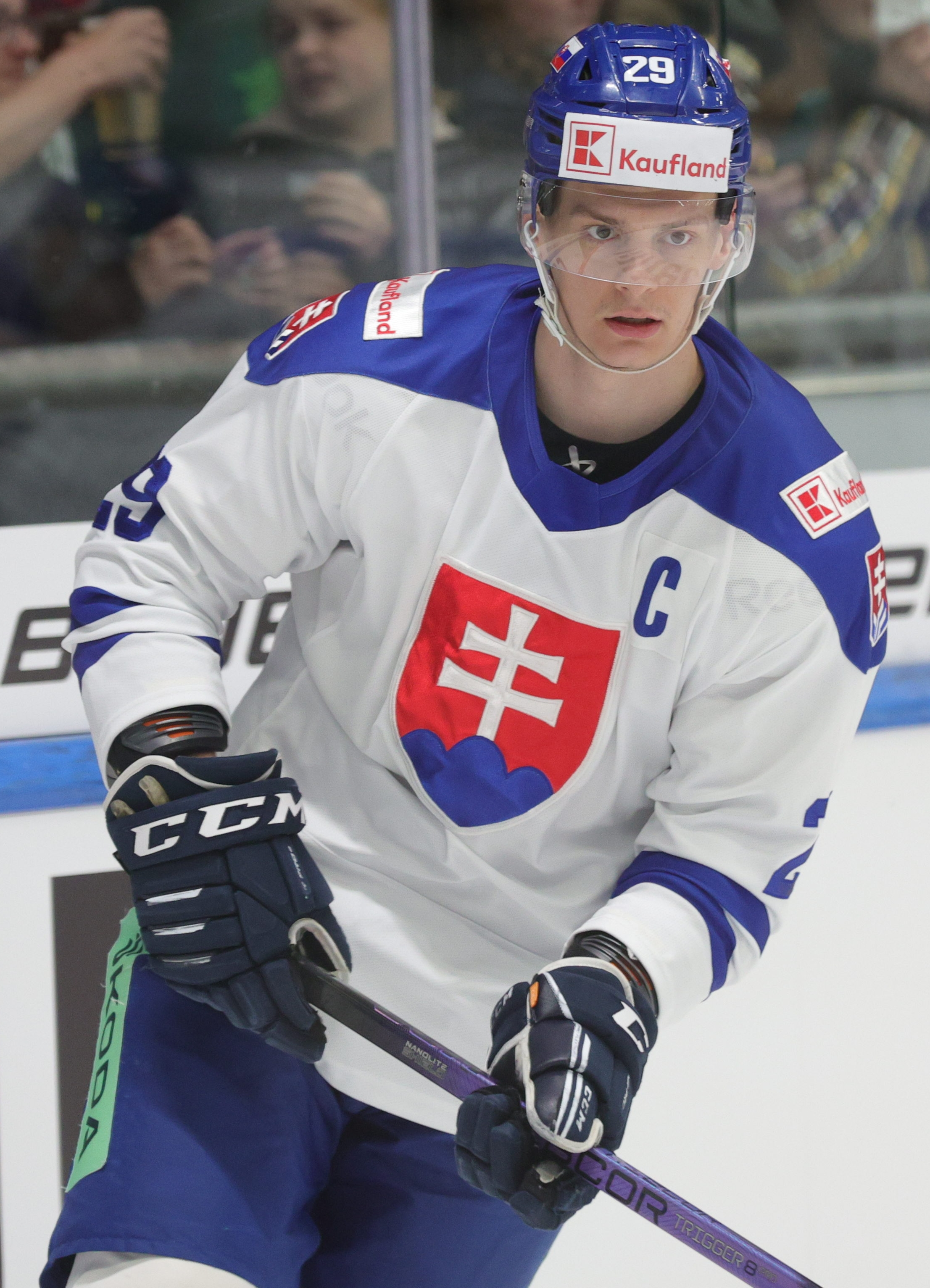
- Michal Ivan, 2024
- Born: 18 November 1999 (age 26) Žiar nad Hronom, Slovakia
- Height: 6 ft 1 in (185 cm)
- Weight: 181 lb (82 kg; 12 st 13 lb)
- Position: Defence
- Shoots: Left
- ELH team Former teams: HC Bílí Tygři Liberec; HKM Zvolen; HC Dynamo Pardubice
- National team: Slovakia
- NHL draft: Undrafted
- Playing career: 2016–present

Michal Ivan (born 18 November 1999) is a Slovak professional ice hockey player who is a defenceman for HC Bílí Tygři Liberec of the Czech Extraliga (ELH).

Ivan played major junior hockey in the Quebec Major Junior Hockey League for the Acadie–Bathurst Titan and the Drummondville Voltigeurs. In returning to the Czech Republic, Ivan signed with HC Dynamo Pardubice on 21 June 2019. He originally made his professional debut with HKM Zvolen in the 2016-17 Slovak Extraliga season.

== International play ==
He was selected to make his full IIHF international debut, participating for Slovakia in the 2021 IIHF World Championship.

== Career statistics ==
=== International ===
Year	Team	Event	Result	GP	G	A	Pts	PIM
2016	Slovakia	U18	5th	5	0	0	0	0
2017	Slovakia	U18	6th	5	0	1	1	4
2018	Slovakia	WJC	7th	5	0	1	1	0
2019	Slovakia	WJC	8th	5	1	3	4	2
2021	Slovakia	WC	8th	2	0	0	0	0
2022	Slovakia	WC	8th	8	0	2	2	2
2023	Slovakia	WC	9th	7	0	2	2	2
2024	Slovakia	WC	7th	8	1	1	2	0
2024	Slovakia	OGQ	Q	3	0	2	2	0
2025	Slovakia	WC	11th	3	0	0	0	0
2026	Slovakia	OG	4th	1	0	0	0	0
Junior totals				20	1	5	6	6
Senior totals				32	1	7	8	4

== Awards and honors ==
Award	Year
Slovak
Champion	2021
