= Eduard Šedivý =

Slovak ice hockey player

- Born: 4 January 1992 (age 33); Myjava, Czechoslovakia
- Height: 5 ft 9 in (175 cm)
- Weight: 165 lb (75 kg; 11 st 11 lb)
- Position: Defence
- Shoots: Left
- Slovak team Former teams: HC Košice; HK 91 Senica; Elliot Lake Bobcats; HK Orange 20; MsHK Žilina; ŠHK 37 Piešťany; HC Slovan Bratislava; Bratislava Capitals; HK Dukla Michalovce
- National team: Slovakia
- Playing career: 2010–present

Eduard Šedivý (born 4 January 1992) is a Slovak professional ice hockey defenceman who is currently playing for HC Košice of the Slovak Extraliga.

== Career ==
He previously played for HK 91 Senica, MsHK Žilina, ŠHK 37 Piešťany and HK Dukla Michalovce. Šedivý has also played for the Slovak national team and participated at the 2017 IIHF World Championship.

== Career statistics ==
=== Regular season and playoffs ===
			Regular season					Playoffs
Season	Team	League	GP	G	A	Pts	PIM	GP	G	A	Pts	PIM

=== International ===
Year	Team	Event	Result	GP	G	A	Pts	PIM
2017	Slovakia	WC	14th	7	0	1	1	0
Senior totals				7	0	1	1	0

== Awards and honors ==
Award	Year
Slovak
Champion	2023
