= 2001–02 Slovak 1. Liga season =

Ice hockey season

The 2001–02 Slovak 1.Liga season was the ninth season of the Slovak 1. Liga, the second level of ice hockey in Slovakia. 11 teams participated in the league, and HK VTJ Spisska Nova Ves won the championship.

== Standings ==
	Club	GP	W	T	L	Goals	Pts
1.	HK VTJ Spišská Nová Ves	40	33	2	5	217:86	68
2.	HC Dukla Senica	40	26	3	11	191:104	55
3.	HC VTJ Topoľčany	40	24	4	12	161:110	52
4.	ŠaHK Iskra Banská Bystrica	40	21	6	13	163:123	48
5.	HK VTJ Farmakol Prešov	40	19	9	12	132:84	47
6.	HK Spartak Dubnica	40	17	9	14	143:128	43
7.	HK Olympik Žilina	40	12	7	21	127:167	31
8.	HK 95 Považská Bystrica	40	13	2	25	108:175	28
9.	HK VTJ Trebišov	40	11	6	23	102:174	28
10.	HKm Zvolen B	40	11	5	24	111:153	27
11.	HK Dukla Michalovce	40	5	3	32	75:226	13
