= Richard Rapáč =

Slovak ice hockey player

- Born: 28 July 1987 (age 38) Spišská Nová Ves, Czechoslovakia
- Height: 6 ft 1 in (185 cm)
- Weight: 187 lb (85 kg; 13 st 5 lb)
- Position: Forward
- Shot: Left
- Played for: HC Bílí Tygři Liberec; HC Vrchlabí; HC Benátky nad Jizerou; HC Hradec Králové; HK Poprad; HC Litvínov; HC Most; HC '05 Banská Bystrica; EVZ Academy; EV Zug; MHk 32 Liptovský Mikuláš; HK Spišská Nová Ves
- Playing career: 2007–2021

Richard Rapáč (born 28 July 1987) is a Slovak former professional ice hockey player.

== Career ==
Rapáč previously played in the Czech Extraliga for HC Bílí Tygři Liberec and HC Litvínov, the Slovak Extraliga for HK Poprad, HC '05 Banská Bystrica and MHk 32 Liptovský Mikuláš and the National League for EV Zug.

He is the older brother of Branislav Rapáč.

== Career statistics ==
=== Regular season and playoffs ===
			Regular season					Playoffs
Season	Team	League	GP	G	A	Pts	PIM	GP	G	A	Pts	PIM
2004–05	HK Poprad	Slovak-Jr.	17	12	5	17	8	—	—	—	—	—
2005–06	HC Zlín	Czech-Jr.	34	14	9	23	93	2	1	1	2	0
2006–07	Moose Jaw Warriors	WHL	28	2	0	2	30	—	—	—	—	—
2006–07	Prince George Cougars	WHL	35	8	7	15	51	13	4	5	9	12
2007–08	HC Bílí Tygři Liberec	Czech	9	1	0	1	2	—	—	—	—	—
2007–08	HC Vrchlabí	Czech.1	13	6	4	10	18	7	1	1	2	22
2008–09	HC Bílí Tygři Liberec	Czech	6	0	0	0	6	—	—	—	—	—
2008–09	HC Benátky nad Jizerou	Czech.1	18	3	3	6	14	—	—	—	—	—
2008–09	HC Vrchlabí	Czech.1	9	1	1	2	4	6	0	5	5	14
2009–10	HC Hradec Králové	Czech.1	18	1	8	9	12	5	0	0	0	16
2010–11	HK Poprad	Slovak	39	4	3	7	66	18	2	2	4	42
2011–12	HK Poprad	Slovak	45	20	27	47	82	5	2	1	3	22
2012–13	HC Litvínov	Czech	39	5	5	10	38	6	0	1	1	8
2013–14	HC Litvínov	Czech	17	1	1	2	2	—	—	—	—	—
2013–14	HC Most	Czech.1	6	2	0	2	22	—	—	—	—	—
2013–14	HC '05 Banská Bystrica	Slovak	5	1	2	3	16	11	1	5	6	39
2014–15	HK Poprad	Slovak	23	5	6	11	48	12	5	1	6	18
2015–16	HK Poprad	Slovak	47	15	19	34	114	5	0	3	3	18
2016–17	EVZ Academy	NLB	39	8	16	24	44	—	—	—	—	—
2016–17	EV Zug	NLA	1	0	0	0	0	—	—	—	—	—
2017–18	HK Poprad	Slovak	11	1	1	2	4	—	—	—	—	—
2017–18	MHk 32 Liptovský Mikuláš	Slovak	13	8	1	9	14	—	—	—	—	—
2018–19	HK Spišská Nová Ves	Slovak.1	1	0	0	0	0	—	—	—	—	—
2019–20	HK Spišská Nová Ves	Slovak.1	1	0	0	0	0	—	—	—	—	—
2020–21	HK Spišská Nová Ves	Slovak.1	32	7	14	21	60	13	5	5	10	68
Slovak totals			183	54	59	113	344	51	10	12	22	139
