= Dominik Riečický =

Slovak ice hockey player

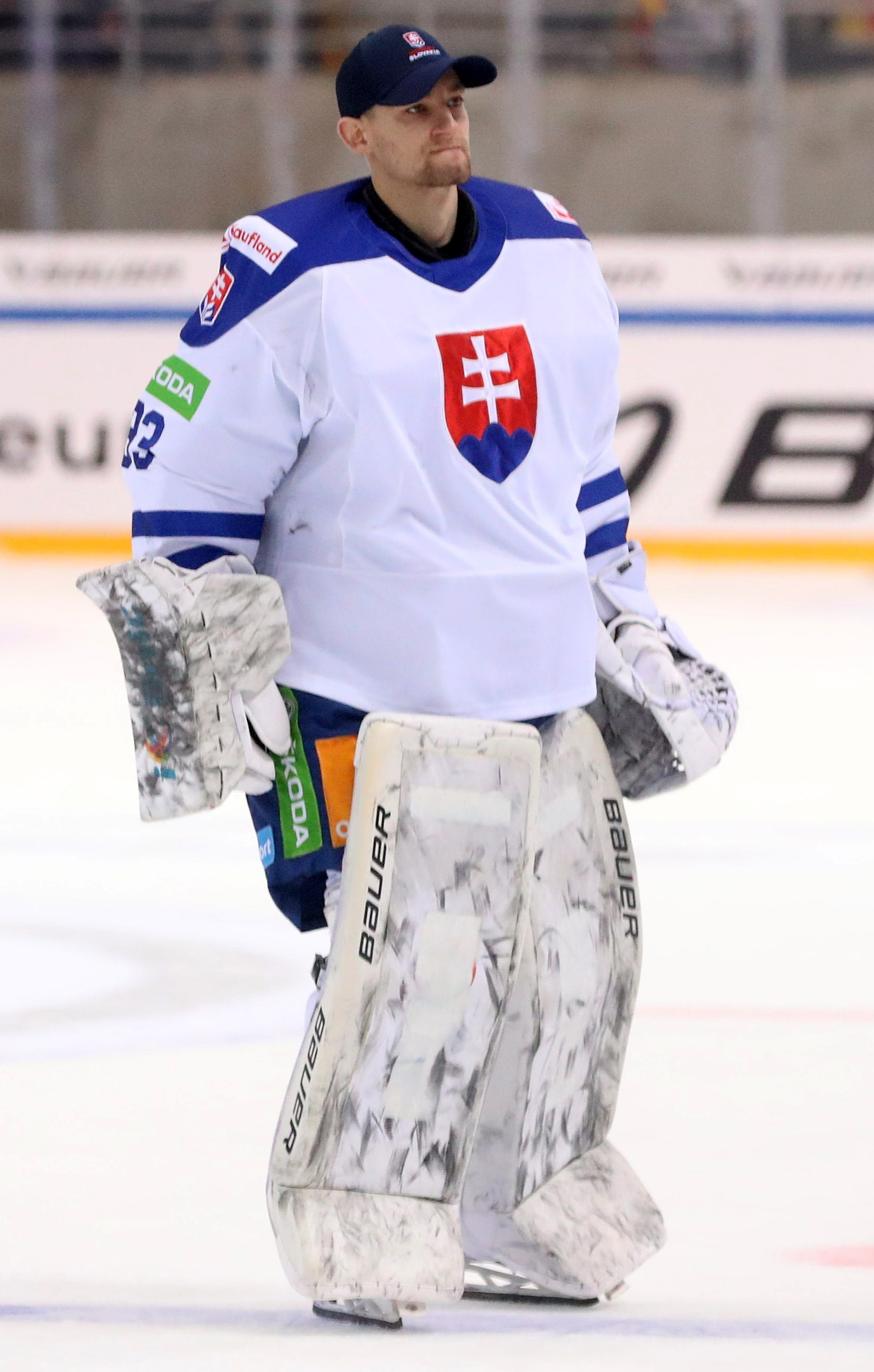
- Born: 9 June 1992 (age 33) Košice, Czechoslovakia
- Height: 6 ft 0 in (183 cm)
- Weight: 154 lb (70 kg; 11 st 0 lb)
- Position: Goaltender
- Catches: Left
- Slovak team Former teams: HC Košice; HC 46 Bardejov; HC Prešov; HK Spišská Nová Ves; HC 07 Detva; HK Martin
- NHL draft: Undrafted
- Playing career: 2011–present

Dominik Riečický (born 9 June 1992) is a Slovak ice hockey goaltender who currently plays with HC Košice of the Slovak Extraliga.

== Career statistics ==
=== Regular season and playoffs ===
			Regular season										Playoffs
Season	Team	League	GP	W	L	T	OTL	MIN	GA	SO	GAA	SV%	GP	W	L	MIN	GA	SO	GAA	SV%

== Awards and honors ==
Award	Year
Slovak
Champion	2014, 2023
Playoffs MVP	2023
