= Tatra Cup =

- Sport: Ice Hockey
- Founded: 1929
- First season: 1929
- No. of teams: 6 (group stage)
- Countries: Slovakia (usually HK Poprad), Czech Republic, various other European countries
- Venues: Poprad Ice Stadium (Poprad, Slovakia)
- Most recent champion: (Slovakia) HK Poprad
- Most titles: (Slovakia) HK Poprad (16 titles)
- Qualification: Invitation only
- Website: hkpoprad.sk/tatransky-pohar

The Tatra Cup (Slovak: Tatranský pohár) is an annual ice hockey tournament held in Poprad, Slovakia. It is the second oldest club tournament in Europe, after the Spengler Cup.

The first installment of the Tatra Cup took place in 1929 in Starý Smokovec. Between the years 1932 and 1935 there were two different tournaments held, a national one and an international one. There were only two installments held from 1952 to 1968 because of problems with organization of the tournament. In later years international teams started to participate as well, e.g. Kölner EC in 1969. One year later for the first time a Swedish team played at the Tatra Cup – Surahammars IF, together with German SC Riessersee.

When a new ice hockey stadium was built in Poprad in 1973, conditions for the organization of the tournament improved considerably. In the anniversary year of the tournament 1979 a hockey club from East Germany Dynamo Weißwasser was invited.

Nowadays, the Tatra Cup is taking place every year in late August as a preparatory tournament for the upcoming season, at which mostly Czech and Slovak teams take part.

== Tatra Cup winners ==
Season/Year	Type	Winner
1929/1930	international	(Czechoslovakia) Slavia Praha
1930/1931	international	(Czechoslovakia) LTC Praha
1931/1932	international	(Czechoslovakia) LTC Praha
1932/1933	international	(Czechoslovakia) SK Prostějov
1932/1933	national	(Czechoslovakia) Skiklub Bratislava
1933/1934	international	(Czechoslovakia) Slavia Praha
1933/1934	national	(Czechoslovakia) AC Nitra
1934/1935	international	(Austria) EKE Wien
1934/1935	national	(Czechoslovakia) ŠK Vysoké Tatry
1935/1936	national	Unfinished due to adverse weather conditions and ineligible ice
1935/1936	international	(Czechoslovakia) AC Sparta Praha
1936/1937	national	(Czechoslovakia) HC Tatry
1937/1938	national	(Czechoslovakia) HC Tatry
1938/1939	national	(Czechoslovakia) HC Tatry
1940/1941	international	(Czechoslovakia) ŠK Slávia Prešov
1941/1942	national	(Czechoslovakia) HC Tatry
1942/1943	Tournament not held	
1945/1946	national	(Czechoslovakia) SK Prostějov
1946/1947	national	(Czechoslovakia) HC Tatry
1949/1950	national	(Czechoslovakia) LTC Praha
1950/1951	national	(Czechoslovakia) Sparta Praha Sokolovo
1951/1952	national	(Czechoslovakia) SK Prostějov
1958/1959	international	(Czechoslovakia) Sparta Praha Sokolovo
1959/1960	international	(Czechoslovakia) Sparta Praha Sokolovo
1968/1969	international	(Czechoslovakia) VŽKG Ostrava
1969/1970	international	(Slovakia) Slovak National Team
1974	international	(Czechoslovakia) Slovan CHZJD Bratislava
1975	national	(Czechoslovakia) Slovan CHZJD Bratislava
1976	international	(Czechoslovakia) Czechoslovak National Team
1977	international	(Czechoslovakia) Czechoslovak National Team
1978	international	(Czechoslovakia) VSŽ Košice
1979	international	(Czechoslovakia) VSŽ Košice
1980	international	(Czechoslovakia) Sparta Praha
1981	international	(Czechoslovakia) Slezan STS Opava
1982	international	(Czechoslovakia) VSŽ Košice
1983	international	(Soviet Union) Dinamo Riga
1984	international	(Czechoslovakia) Tesla Pardubice
1985	international	(Czechoslovakia) HC Dukla Trenčín
1986	international	(Czechoslovakia) VSŽ Košice
1987	international	(Czechoslovakia) VSŽ Košice
1988	international	(Czechoslovakia) VSŽ Košice
1989	international	(Soviet Union) HK Sokol Kiev
1990	international	(Czechoslovakia) ŠK Slovan Bratislava
1991	international	Czechoslovakia U-20
1992	international	(Czechoslovakia) HC Košice
1993	international	(Slovakia) HC Košice
1994	international	Slovakia U-20
1995	international	(Slovakia) HC ŠKP PS Poprad
1996	international	(Slovakia) HC Dukla Trenčín
1997	international	(Slovakia) HC Slovan Bratislava
1998	international	(Slovakia) HC Slovan Bratislava
1999	international	(Slovakia) Slovak Olympic Team
2000	international	(Slovakia) HC ŠKP Poprad
2001	international	(Slovakia) HC ŠKP Poprad
2002	international	(Czech Republic) HC Vítkovice
2003	international	(Russia) HC Neftekhimik Nizhnekamsk
2004	international	Slovakia U-23
2005	international	(Slovakia) HK Tatravagónka ŠKP Poprad
2006	international	(Czech Republic) HC Vítkovice
2007	international	(Czech Republic) HC Vítkovice
2008	international	(Slovakia) HC Košice
2009	international	(Czech Republic) HC Vítkovice Steel
2010	international	(Czech Republic) HC Oceláři Třinec
2011	international	(Germany) Kölner Haie
2012	national	(Slovakia) HK Poprad
2013	international	(Austria) Graz 99ers
2014	international	(Slovakia) HK Poprad
2015	international	(Austria) Graz 99ers
2016	international	(Finland) Lahti Pelicans
2017	international	(Slovakia) HC Košice
2018	international	(Slovakia) HK Poprad
2019	international	(Hungary) DVTK Jegesmedvék
2020	national	(Slovakia) HK Poprad
2021	international	(Italy) HC Pustertal
2022	international	(Slovakia) HC '05 Banská Bystrica
2023	international	(Slovakia) HK Poprad
2024	national	(Slovakia) HC Košice
2025	national	(Slovakia) HK Poprad
2026	international	(Slovakia) HK Poprad

== Performances ==
=== By club (international tournaments) ===
Club	Won	Years won
(Slovakia) HC Košice	10	1978, 1979, 1982, 1986, 1987, 1988, 1992, 1993, 2008, 2017
(Slovakia) HK Poprad	8	1995, 2000, 2001, 2005, 2014, 2018, 2023, 2026
(Czech Republic) HC Vítkovice	5	1968/1969, 2002, 2006, 2007, 2009
(Slovakia) Slovak National Team	4	1969/1970, 1994, 1999, 2004
(Slovakia) HC Slovan Bratislava	4	1974, 1990, 1997, 1998
(Czech Republic) HC Sparta Praha	4	1935/1936, 1958/1959, 1959/1960, 1980
(Czechoslovakia) Czechoslovak National Team	3	1976, 1977, 1991
(Czech Republic) HC Slavia Praha	2	1929/1930, 1933/1934
(Czechoslovakia) LTC Praha	2	1930/1931, 1931/1932
(Slovakia) HK Dukla Trenčín	2	1985, 1996
(Austria) Graz 99ers	2	2013, 2015
(Czech Republic) SK Prostějov	1	1932/1933
(Austria) EKE Wien	1	1934/1935
(Slovakia) ŠK Slávia Prešov	1	1940/1941
(Czech Republic) Slezan STS Opava	1	1981
(Latvia) Dinamo Riga	1	1983
(Czech Republic) Tesla Pardubice	1	1984
(Ukraine) HC Sokol Kiev	1	1989
(Russia) HC Neftekhimik Nizhnekamsk	1	2003
(Czech Republic) HC Oceláři Třinec	1	2010
(Germany) Kölner Haie	1	2011
(Finland) Lahti Pelicans	1	2016
(Hungary) DVTK Jegesmedvék	1	2019
(Italy) HC Pustertal	1	2021
(Slovakia) HC '05 Banská Bystrica	1	2022

=== By club (national tournaments) ===
Club	Won	Years won
(Slovakia) HC Tatry	5	1936/1937, 1937/1938, 1938/1939, 1941/1942, 1946/1947
(Czech Republic) SK Prostějov	2	1945/46, 1951/1952
(Slovakia) HK Poprad	3	2012, 2020, 2025
(Slovakia) Skiklub Bratislava	1	1932/1933
(Slovakia) AC Nitra	1	1933/1934
(Slovakia) ŠK Vysoké Tatry	1	1934/1935
(Czechoslovakia) LTC Praha	1	1949/1950
(Czech Republic) HC Sparta Praha	1	1950/1951
(Slovakia) Slovan CHZJD Bratislava	1	1975
(Slovakia) HC Košice	1	2024

=== By country (international tournaments) ===
Nation	Winners
Czechoslovakia	27
Slovakia	18
Czechia	5
Austria	3
Soviet Union	2
Russia	1
Germany	1
Finland	1
Hungary	1
Italy	1
