= Adam Trenčan =

Slovak ice hockey player

- Born: July 10, 1990 (age 34); Banská Bystrica, Czechoslovakia
- Height: 6 ft 1 in (185 cm)
- Weight: 192 lb (87 kg; 13 st 10 lb)
- Position: Goaltender
- Catches: Left
- Slovak team Former teams: HKM Zvolen; HC Slezan Opava; HC 07 Detva; HK Skalica; HC Oceláři Třinec; HC Benátky nad Jizerou; HK Spišská Nová Ves; Lausitzer Füchse; HK Nitra; HK Dukla Michalovce
- NHL draft: Undrafted
- Playing career: 2008–present

Adam Trenčan (born July 10, 1990) is a Slovak professional ice hockey goaltender for the HKM Zvolen of the Slovak Extraliga.

== Career statistics ==
=== Regular season and playoffs ===
			Regular season										Playoffs
Season	Team	League	GP	W	L	T	OTL	MIN	GA	SO	GAA	SV%	GP	W	L	MIN	GA	SO	GAA	SV%
