= 1995–96 Slovak 1. Liga season =

Sports season

The 1995–96 Slovak 1.Liga season was the third season of the Slovak 1. Liga, the second level of ice hockey in Slovakia. 12 teams participated in the league, and HK VTJ Spisska Nova Ves won the championship.

== Regular season ==
	Club	GP	W	T	L	Goals	Pts
1.	HK VTJ Spišská Nová Ves	44	29	6	9	198:114	64
2.	HKm Zvolen	44	26	6	12	181:107	58
3.	HK 36 Skalica	44	25	4	15	163:132	54
4.	HC VTJ Michalovce	44	24	4	16	192:150	52
5.	HK ŠKP Žilina	44	19	8	17	156:143	46
6.	HC Dukla Senica	44	19	7	18	157:162	45
7.	HC Polygón Nitra	44	19	6	19	163:151	44
8.	HC VTJ Topoľčany	44	18	5	21	135:164	41
9.	HK VTJ Piešťany	44	14	8	22	133:164	36
10.	HK 31 Kežmarok	44	14	8	22	105:147	36
11.	ŠK Matador Púchov	44	9	10	25	115:197	28
12.	HK PPS Detva	44	10	4	30	117:184	24

== Qualification round ==
	Club	GP	W	T	L	Goals	Pts
5.	HC VTJ Topoľčany	58	28	5	25	205:203	61
6.	HC Polygón Nitra	58	26	8	24	221:199	60
7.	HK ŠKP Žilina	58	23	11	24	214:207	57
8.	HC Dukla Senica	58	23	9	26	197:220	55
9.	HK 31 Kežmarok	58	21	9	28	138:180	51
10.	HK VTJ Piešťany	58	18	9	31	180:237	45
11.	ŠK Matador Púchov	58	17	10	31	165:239	44
12.	HK PPS Detva	58	17	5	36	166:232	39
