= Branislav Kubka =

Slovak ice hockey player

- Born: August 15, 1988 (age 37) Detva, Czechoslovakia
- Height: 6 ft 2 in (188 cm)
- Weight: 194 lb (88 kg; 13 st 12 lb)
- Position: Defence
- Shoots: Right
- Tipsport Liga team Former teams: HKM Zvolen; HC ’05 Banská Bystrica; HC Karlovy Vary; HC Plzeň; HK Nitra
- NHL draft: Undrafted
- Playing career: 2006–present

Branislav Kubka (born August 15, 1988) is a Slovak professional ice hockey player. He is currently playing for HKM Zvolen of the Tipsport Liga.

Kubka made his Czech Extraliga debut playing with HC Plzeň during the 2013-14 Czech Extraliga season.

== Awards and honors ==
Award	Year
Slovak
Champion	2017, 2018, 2019, 2021
