= 2022–23 Slovak Extraliga season =

- League: Slovak Extraliga
- Sport: Ice hockey
- Duration: 16 September 2022 – 5 March 2023 (regular season); 8 March – 23 April (playoffs)
- Number of games: 50
- Number of teams: 12

Regular season
- League Champion: HC Košice
- Top scorer: Max Gerlach (Prešov); (59 points)

Playoffs
- Playoffs MVP: Dominik Riečický (Košice)

Finals
- Champions: HC Košice
- Runners-up: HKM Zvolen

Slovak Extraliga seasons
- ← 2021–22 2023–24 →

The 2022–23 Slovak Extraliga season was the 30th season of the Slovak Extraliga, the highest ice hockey league in Slovakia.

== Regular season ==
=== Standings ===
Each team played 50 games: playing each of the other eleven teams four times – 2x at home, 2x away (44 games) and during the Christmas holidays (20.12.2022 – 4.1.2023) each team played the inserted matches within the region 1x at home, 1x away = 6 games.

Points were awarded for each game, where three points are awarded for winning in regulation time, two points for winning in overtime or shootout, one point for losing in overtime or shootout, and zero points for losing in regulation time. At the end of the regular season, the team that finished with the most points was crowned the league champion.

Pos	Team	Pld	W	OTW	OTL	L	GF	GA	GD	Pts	Qualification
1	Košice	50	28	5	2	15	163	114	+49	96	Qualification to Quarter-finals
2	Slovan Bratislava	50	27	3	6	14	162	115	+47	93	Qualification to Quarter-finals
3	Zvolen	50	24	4	7	15	168	141	+27	87	Qualification to Quarter-finals
4	Banská Bystrica	50	21	7	2	20	147	156	−9	79	Qualification to Quarter-finals
5	Spišská Nová Ves	50	21	3	10	16	146	144	+2	79	Qualification to Quarter-finals
6	Nové Zámky	50	21	6	2	21	143	132	+11	77	Qualification to Quarter-finals
7	Poprad	50	17	9	3	21	151	153	−2	72	Qualification to Wild card round
8	Michalovce	50	17	7	7	19	124	129	−5	72	Qualification to Wild card round
9	Trenčín	50	19	3	5	23	130	155	−25	68	Qualification to Wild card round
10	Nitra	50	17	3	4	26	125	157	−32	61	Qualification to Wild card round
11	Liptovský Mikuláš	50	16	3	7	24	124	149	−25	61	
12	Prešov	50	11	8	6	25	129	167	−38	55	Relegated to Slovak 1. Liga

Source: Tipos extraliga
Rules for classification: 1) Points; 2) Head-to-head points.

=== Statistics ===
==== Scoring leaders ====
The following shows the top ten players who led the league in points, at the conclusion of the regular season.

Player	Team	GP	G	A	Pts	+/–	PIM
(United States) Max Gerlach	HC 21 Prešov	50	34	25	59	+8	26
(Canada) Brant Harris	HC Slovan Bratislava	48	29	27	56	+17	26
(United States) Robby Jackson	HC Nové Zámky	49	30	21	51	+16	10
(United States) Liam Pecararo	HC Slovan Bratislava	50	25	25	50	+22	36
(United States) Mike Huntebrinker	HKM Zvolen	50	13	37	50	+15	43
(Finland) Joona Jääskeläinen	HC Košice	47	22	23	45	−11	16
(United States) Austin Farley	HC Nové Zámky	48	15	30	45	+10	47
(Canada) Kale Kerbashian	HK Spišská Nová Ves	46	20	24	44	−3	10
(Slovakia) Tomáš Záborský	HK Poprad	50	20	24	44	−5	14
(Canada) Branden Troock	HC '05 Banská Bystrica	44	29	14	43	+6	47

==== Leading goaltenders ====
The following shows the top ten goaltenders who led the league in goals against average, provided that they have played at least 40% of their team's minutes, at the conclusion of matches played on 20 January 2023.

Player	Team	GP	TOI	W	L	GA	SO	Sv%	GAA
(Slovakia) Jaroslav Janus	HC Košice	16	865:48	11	5	27	1	93.48	1.87
(Canada) Jared Coreau	HC Slovan Bratislava	25	1486:23	17	8	47	6	93.90	1.90
(Slovakia) Stanislav Škorvánek	HK Dukla Michalovce	22	1305:10	12	10	49	1	93.35	2.25
(Slovakia) Dominik Riečický	HC Košice	19	930:14	10	9	37	1	91.76	2.39
(Czech Republic) Pavel Kantor	HC Nové Zámky	37	2218:30	20	17	89	1	93.04	2.41
(Slovakia) Adam Trenčan	HKM Zvolen	25	1457:21	17	8	61	4	92.08	2.51
(Canada) Anthony Peters	HK Poprad	28	1635:46	16	12	69	1	91.82	2.53
(Canada) Connor LaCouvee	HK Dukla Trenčín	29	1644:13	13	16	71	3	92.90	2.59
(Slovakia) Marcel Melicherčík	HK Spišská Nová Ves	29	1729:46	15	14	76	1	90.98	2.64
(Slovakia) Michal Valent	MHk 32 Liptovský Mikuláš	33	1727:57	13	20	80	3	90.85	2.78

== Playoffs ==
Ten teams qualify for the playoffs: the top six teams in the regular season have a bye to the quarterfinals, while teams ranked seventh to tenth meet each other (7 versus 10, 8 versus 9) in a preliminary playoff round.

=== Bracket ===
Wild-card round (best-of-5)
7	Poprad	0
10	Nitra	3
8	Michalovce	3
9	Trenčín	2

Quarter-finals (best-of-7)
1	Košice	4
10	Nitra	1
2	Slovan Bratislava	2
8	Michalovce	4
3	Zvolen	4
6	Nové Zámky	1
4	Banská Bystrica	3
5	Spišská Nová Ves	4

Semi-finals (best-of-7)
1	Košice	4
8	Michalovce	3
(Pairings are re-seeded after the first and second round)
3	Zvolen	4
5	Spišská Nová Ves	3

Finals (best-of-7)
1	Košice	4
3	Zvolen	1

=== Wild card round ===
Poprad – Nitra 0–3
8.3.2023	Poprad	Nitra	1-2
9.3.2023	Poprad	Nitra	1-2
11.3.2023	Nitra	Poprad	2-0
Nitra won the series 3–0.

Michalovce – Trenčín 3–2
8.3.2023	Michalovce	Trenčín	2-1
9.3.2023	Michalovce	Trenčín	4-6
11.3.2023	Trenčín	Michalovce	2-0
12.3.2023	Trenčín	Michalovce	2-3
14.3.2023	Michalovce	Trenčín	2-1
Michalovce won the series 3–2.

=== Quarterfinals ===
Košice – Nitra 4–1
17.3.2023	Košice	Nitra	5-2
18.3.2023	Košice	Nitra	4-3 SO
21.3.2023	Nitra	Košice	5-2
22.3.2023	Nitra	Košice	1-2
24.3.2023	Košice	Nitra	4-2
Košice won the series 4–1.

Zvolen – Nové Zámky 4–1
15.3.2023	Zvolen	Nové Zámky	4-3 OT
16.3.2023	Zvolen	Nové Zámky	4-3 OT
19.3.2023	Nové Zámky	Zvolen	5-2
20.3.2023	Nové Zámky	Zvolen	2-4
23.3.2023	Zvolen	Nové Zámky	5-2
Zvolen won the series 4–1.

Slovan Bratislava – Michalovce 2–4
17.3.2023	Slovan Bratislava	Michalovce	5-2
18.3.2023	Slovan Bratislava	Michalovce	2-3 OT
21.3.2023	Michalovce	Slovan Bratislava	3-2 OT
22.3.2023	Michalovce	Slovan Bratislava	3-1
24.3.2023	Slovan Bratislava	Michalovce	4-0
26.3.2023	Michalovce	Slovan Bratislava	3-0
Michalovce won the series 4–2.

Banská Bystrica – Spišská Nová Ves 3–4
15.3.2023	Banská Bystrica	Spišská Nová Ves	3-2
16.3.2023	Banská Bystrica	Spišská Nová Ves	0-6
19.3.2023	Spišská Nová Ves	Banská Bystrica	2-5
20.3.2023	Spišská Nová Ves	Banská Bystrica	2-0
23.3.2023	Banská Bystrica	Spišská Nová Ves	4-1
25.3.2023	Spišská Nová Ves	Banská Bystrica	4-2
27.3.2023	Banská Bystrica	Spišská Nová Ves	2-3 OT
Spišská Nová Ves won the series 4–3.

=== Semifinals ===
Košice – Michalovce 4–3
31.3.2023	Košice	Michalovce	3-1
1.4.2023	Košice	Michalovce	2-0
4.4.2023	Michalovce	Košice	3-2
5.4.2023	Michalovce	Košice	4-1
8.4.2023	Košice	Michalovce	2-3 OT2
10.4.2023	Michalovce	Košice	1-2
12.4.2023	Košice	Michalovce	3-1
Košice won the series 4–3.

Zvolen – Spišská Nová Ves 4–3
2.4.2023	Zvolen	Spišská Nová Ves	2-4
3.4.2023	Zvolen	Spišská Nová Ves	2-1 SO
6.4.2023	Spišská Nová Ves	Zvolen	3-1
7.4.2023	Spišská Nová Ves	Zvolen	1-3
9.4.2023	Zvolen	Spišská Nová Ves	5-6
11.4.2023	Spišská Nová Ves	Zvolen	0-3
13.4.2023	Zvolen	Spišská Nová Ves	3-2
Zvolen won the series 4–3.

=== Finals ===
16 April 2023; 18:00	Košice	3–1 (1–1, 1–0, 1–0) score in the series: 1–0	Zvolen	Steel Aréna, Košice; Attendance: 8,347

Game reference

Dominik Riečický
Goalies
Adam Trenčan
Referees:
Vladimír Baluška
Peter Stano
Linesmen:
Šimon Synek
Oto Durmis

	0–1	11:43 – Hecl (Marcinek, Messner)
Fejes (Breton) (PP) – 14:37	1–1
Bartánus (Pollock, Chovan) (PP) – 20:21	2–1
Olsson (Lamper) (EN) – 59:30	3–1

4 min
Penalties
6 min
16
Shots
36

17 April 2023; 18:00	Košice	1–0 (1–0, 0–0, 0–0) score in the series: 2–0	Zvolen	Steel Aréna, Košice; Attendance: 8,347

Game reference
Dominik Riečický	Goalies	Adam Trenčan	Referees: Vladimír Snášel ml. Miroslav Štefik; Linesmen: Peter Jedlička; Daniel Konc ml.
Slovák (Jokeľ, Havrila) – 18:11 / 1–0			Referees: Vladimír Snášel ml. Miroslav Štefik; Linesmen: Peter Jedlička; Daniel Konc ml.
6 min	Penalties	12 min	Referees: Vladimír Snášel ml. Miroslav Štefik; Linesmen: Peter Jedlička; Daniel Konc ml.
25	Shots	21	Referees: Vladimír Snášel ml. Miroslav Štefik; Linesmen: Peter Jedlička; Daniel Konc ml.

20 April 2023; 18:30	Zvolen	1–3 (1–1, 0–1, 0–1) score in the series: 0–3	Košice	Zvolen Ice Stadium, Zvolen; Attendance: 5,020

Game reference

Adam Trenčan
Goalies
Dominik Riečický
Referees:
Marek Žák
Vladimír Snášel ml.
Linesmen:
Matúš Stanzel
Ľudovít Šoltés

Zuzin (Viedenský, Marcinek) – 11:51	1–0
	1–1	16:16 – Pollock (Jääskeläinen) (PP)
	1–2	31:17 – Fejes (Bartánus, Breton)
	1–3	46:24 – Jääskeläinen (Southorn, Leskinen)

14 min
Penalties
10 min
33
Shots
30

21 April 2023; 18:30	Zvolen	5–2 (0–0, 3–2, 2–0) score in the series: 1–3	Košice	Zvolen Ice Stadium, Zvolen; Attendance: 5,345

Game reference

Adam Trenčan
Goalies
Dominik Riečický
Jaroslav Janus
Referees:
Tomáš Hronský
Miroslav Štefik
Linesmen:
Tomáš Gegáň
Šimon Synek

Hanna (Hecl, Jedlička) (PP) – 21:35	1–0
	1–1	26:11 – Olsson (Slovák, Leskinen)
Mudrák (Bondra, Jedlička) – 27:10	2–1
Zuzin (Kubka) – 27:21	3–1
	3–2	30:56 – Havrila (Lamper, Breton)
Turnbull (Hanna, Sideroff) – 51:33	4–2
Viedenský (EN) – 59:37	5–2

6 min
Penalties
12 min
37
Shots
31

23 April 2023; 18:00	Košice	3–0 (0–0, 1–0, 2–0) score in the series: 4–1	Zvolen	Steel Aréna, Košice; Attendance: 8,347

Game reference

Dominik Riečický
Goalies
Adam Trenčan
Referees:
Tomáš Hronský
Peter Stano
Linesmen:
Peter Jedlička
Daniel Konc ml.

Pollock (Šedivý, Southorn) – 23:20	1–0
Leskinen (Jääskeläinen) – 40:55	2–0
Šedivý (Fejes, Bartánus) (EN) – 57:33	3–0

6 min
Penalties
8 min
27
Shots
31

== Final rankings ==
Gold medal	Košice
Silver medal	Zvolen
Bronze medal	Spišská Nová Ves
4	Michalovce
5	Slovan Bratislava
6	Banská Bystrica
7	Nové Zámky
8	Nitra
9	Poprad
10	Trenčín
11	Liptovský Mikuláš
12	Prešov
