= 2019–20 Slovak Extraliga season =

- League: Slovak Extraliga
- Sport: Ice hockey
- Duration: September 2019 – March 2020
- Number of teams: 13

Regular season
- First place: HC '05 Banská Bystrica
- Runners-up: HC Slovan Bratislava
- Top scorer: Marcel Haščák (Košice)

Playoffs

Slovak Extraliga seasons
- ← 2018–19 2020–21 →

The 2019–20 Slovak Extraliga season was the 27th season of the Slovak Extraliga, the highest ice hockey league in Slovakia. Since the 2018–19 season, the league also includes two teams from Hungary.

The season was ended prematurely due to the COVID-19 pandemic in Slovakia, the season was curtailed on 11 March.

== Team changes ==
HC Slovan Bratislava returns to the league in this season since it was not able to continue in the KHL due to financial problems. The club has won eight Slovak championships (most recently in 2012) and one Czechoslovak championship (1979), making it the second most successful ice hockey club in Slovak history after their biggest rival HC Košice. In the season 2019–20 no team will be relegated.

HK Dukla Michalovce are playing in the league for the first time after winning promotion from the Slovak 1. Liga in a best-of-seven playoff against MsHK Žilina, which was therefore relegated.

HK Orange 20, who had participated in the league as a project to prepare the Slovakia junior ice hockey team for the IIHF World Junior Championship, were removed from the league.

== Regular season ==
Each team played 48 games, playing each of the other twelve teams four times. Points were awarded for each game, where three points were awarded for winning in regulation time, two points for winning in overtime or shootouts, one point for losing in overtime or shootouts and zero points for losing in regulation time.

=== Standings ===
Pos	Team	Pld	W	OTW	OTL	L	GF	GA	GD	Pts	Qualification
1	Banská Bystrica	48	27	9	3	9	154	93	+61	102	Qualification to Group 1–6
2	Slovan Bratislava	48	28	6	4	10	173	95	+78	100	Qualification to Group 1–6
3	Košice	48	25	9	4	10	146	98	+48	97	Qualification to Group 1–6
4	Poprad	48	24	5	5	14	148	114	+34	87	Qualification to Group 1–6
5	Zvolen	48	28	0	3	17	173	127	+46	87	Qualification to Group 1–6
6	Trenčín	48	22	5	5	16	148	121	+27	81	Qualification to Group 1–6
7	Michalovce	48	18	4	7	19	125	136	−11	69	Qualification to Group 7–12
8	Nitra	48	18	2	7	21	124	136	−12	65	Qualification to Group 7–12
9	Miskolc	48	17	5	3	23	127	143	−16	64	Qualification to Group 7–12
10	Budapest	48	14	2	5	27	139	184	−45	51	Qualification to Group 7–12
11	Nové Zámky	48	11	6	5	26	125	166	−41	50	Qualification to Group 7–12
12	Detva	48	14	2	2	30	112	173	−61	48	Qualification to Group 7–12
13	Liptovský Mikuláš	48	8	3	5	32	78	186	−108	35	

Source: Tipsport Liga
Rules for classification: 1) Points; 2) Head-to-head points

=== Group 1–6 ===
Each team played 10 games, playing each of the other five teams two times. Points were awarded for each game, where three points were awarded for winning in regulation time, two points for winning in overtime or shootouts, one point for losing in overtime or shootouts and zero points for losing in regulation time.

Pos	Team	Pld	W	OTW	OTL	L	GF	GA	GD	Pts	Qualification
1	Banská Bystrica	55	32	10	4	9	180	109	+71	120	Qualification to Quarter-finals
2	Slovan Bratislava	55	29	8	5	13	191	118	+73	108	Qualification to Quarter-finals
3	Košice	55	28	9	4	14	163	114	+49	106	Qualification to Quarter-finals
4	Poprad	55	28	5	5	17	170	131	+39	99	Qualification to Quarter-finals
5	Trenčín	55	26	5	5	19	167	139	+28	93	Qualification to Quarter-finals
6	Zvolen	55	29	0	4	22	186	152	+34	91	Qualification to Quarter-finals

Updated to match(es) played on 8 March 2020. Source: Tipsport Liga
Rules for classification: 1) Points; 2) Head-to-head points

=== Group 7–12 ===
Each team played 10 games, playing each of the other five teams two times. Points were awarded for each game, where three points were awarded for winning in regulation time, two points for winning in overtime or shootouts, one point for losing in overtime or shootouts and zero points for losing in regulation time.

Pos	Team	Pld	W	OTW	OTL	L	GF	GA	GD	Pts	Qualification
7	Michalovce	55	20	5	8	22	152	157	−5	78	Qualification to Quarter-finals
8	Nitra	55	21	3	8	23	149	157	−8	77	Qualification to Quarter-finals
9	Miskolc	55	20	7	3	25	148	158	−10	77	
10	Budapest	55	18	2	5	30	158	201	−43	63	
11	Nové Zámky	55	13	6	8	28	143	188	−45	59	
12	Detva	55	16	3	2	34	131	206	−75	56	

Updated to match(es) played on 8 March 2020. Source: Tipsport Liga
Rules for classification: 1) Points; 2) Head-to-head points

== Playoffs ==
The playoffs were cancelled as a result of the COVID-19 pandemic in Slovakia.

== Statistics ==
=== Scoring leaders ===
The following shows the top ten players who led the league in points, at the conclusion of the regular season.

Player	Team	GP	G	A	Pts	+/–	PIM
(Czech Republic) Jindřich Abdul	HC Slovan Bratislava	53	23	39	62	+41	58
(Canada) Brock Trotter	HKM Zvolen	51	14	46	60	+4	78
(Canada) Alan McPherson	HKM Zvolen	51	21	38	59	+28	46
(Slovakia) Marcel Haščák	HC Košice	45	33	22	55	+19	36
(Czech Republic) Josef Mikyska	HK Dukla Trenčín	53	14	41	55	–7	50
(Canada) Jordan Hickmott	HC '05 Banská Bystrica	55	21	33	54	+24	12
(Slovakia) Dávid Skokan	HC Košice	53	18	35	53	+3	76
(Canada) Jordon Southorn	HC '05 Banská Bystrica	51	13	38	51	+20	116
(Slovakia) Tomáš Zigo	HC Slovan Bratislava	51	27	22	49	+37	80
(Hungary) István Sofron	MAC Budapest	54	24	24	48	–6	68

=== Leading goaltenders ===
The following shows the top ten goaltenders who led the league in goals against average, provided that they have played at least 40% of their team's minutes, at the conclusion of the regular season.

Player	Team	GP	TOI	W	L	GA	SO	Sv%	GAA
(Canada) Barry Brust	HC Slovan Bratislava	29	1707:31	21	8	49	5	93.67	1.72
(Slovakia) Andrej Košarišťan	HC Košice	42	2557:15	31	11	77	5	93.37	1.81
(Canada) Tyler Beskorowany	HC '05 Banská Bystrica	44	2618:48	33	11	89	2	92.98	2.04
(Czech Republic) Tomáš Vošvrda	HK Poprad	44	2641:34	26	18	97	6	92.51	2.20
(Slovakia) Matej Tomek	HK Dukla Trenčín	32	1899:41	20	12	74	2	92.72	2.34
(Czech Republic) Vladislav Habal	HC Slovan Bratislava	27	1592:25	16	11	64	1	91.72	2.41
(Slovakia) Tomáš Tomek	HKM Zvolen	42	2465:42	21	21	101	2	91.46	2.46
(Slovakia) Michal Valent	HK Dukla Trenčín	25	1420:49	12	13	59	4	92.12	2.49
(Slovakia) Adam Trenčan	HK Dukla Michalovce	44	2098:00	21	23	106	2	91.53	2.57
(Hungary) Miklós Rajna	DVTK Jegesmedvék	37	2131:14	18	19	99	2	91.62	2.79
