= HK Spišská Nová Ves =

- Nickname: Novejša
- City: Spišská Nová Ves, Slovakia
- League: Slovak Extraliga
- Founded: 1932
- Home arena: Tiposbet aréna (capacity 5,503)
- Colours: blue, yellow, white
- General manager: Richard Rapáč
- Head coach: Jason O'Leary
- Captain: Branislav Rapáč
- Website: hksnv.sk

HK Spišská Nová Ves is a professional Slovak ice hockey club based in Spišská Nová Ves. They currently play in the Slovak Extraliga. The club is a four-time and current winner of the second highest competition Slovak 1. Liga, as it won in the 2020–21 season and advanced to Slovak Extraliga. They play their home games in Spiš Aréna in the eastern Slovak town Spišská Nová Ves. The team was established in 1932.

== Honours ==
=== Domestic ===
Slovak Extraliga

- (silver) Runners-up (1): 2023–24
- (bronze) 3rd place (1): 2022–23

Slovak 1. Liga

- (gold) Winners (4): 1995–96, 2001–02, 2008–09, 2020–21
- (silver) Runners-up (3): 2006–07, 2007–08, 2014–15
- (bronze) 3rd place (1): 2010–11

1st. Slovak National Hockey League

- (silver) Runners-up (1): 1990–91
- (bronze) 3rd place (1): 1991–92

== Players ==
=== Current roster ===
As of 15 December 2024.

No.	Nat	Player	Pos	S/G	Age	Acquired	Birthplace
4	(Lithuania)	Nerijus Ališauskas (A)	D	R	34	2022	Elektrėnai, Lithuania
48	(Slovakia)	Samuel Barcik	D	R	20	2024	Zvolen, Slovakia
8	(Slovakia)	Tim Danielčák	LW	L	22	2023	Kežmarok, Slovakia
12	(Slovakia)	Michael Drábek	RW	L	24	2023	Partizánske, Slovakia
91	(Slovakia)	Róbert Džugan	LW	L	25	2022	Levoča, Slovakia
22	(United States)	Connor Ford	C	L	27	2024	Pittsburgh, Pennsylvania, United States
20	(Slovakia)	Šimon Groch	D	L	22	2022	Liptovský Mikuláš, Slovakia
89	(Italy)	Dante Hannoun	C	R	27	2024	Delta, British Columbia, Canada
13	(Canada)	Stephen Harper	LW	L	30	2024	Hamilton, Ontario, Canada
62	(United States)	Josh Kestner	RW	R	32	2024	Huntsville, Alabama, United States
46	(Canada)	Ryan MacKinnon	D	R	31	2024	Summerside, Prince Edward Island, Canada
30	(Latvia)	Mareks Mitens	G	L	27	2024	Ventspils, Latvia
10	(Slovakia)	Oleksii Myklukha	C	R	23	2022	Białystok, Poland
19	(Slovakia)	Branislav Rapáč (C)	RW	R	32	2021	Spišská Nová Ves, Slovakia
6	(Slovakia)	Dávid Romaňák (A)	D	L	26	2020	Poprad, Slovakia
27	(Slovakia)	Patrik Stevuliak	LW	R	30	2024	Trstená, Slovakia
11	(Slovakia)	Martin Šuty	LW	L	20	2022	Krompachy, Slovakia
44	(Slovakia)	Juraj Valach	D	R	36	2022	Topoľčany, Czechoslovakia
31	(Slovakia)	Štefan Valluš	G	L	24	2024	Poprad, Slovakia
45	(Slovakia)	Michael Vandas (A)	RW	L	34	2022	Poprad, Czechoslovakia
23	(Slovakia)	Lukáš Vartovník (A)	C	L	36	2018	Gelnica, Czechoslovakia
21	(Slovakia)	Adam Žiak	D	L	26	2022	Spišská Nová Ves, Slovakia

== Notable players ==
- Martin Štrbák
- Richard Lintner
- Martin Bakoš
- Július Hudáček
- Adam Jánošík
- Martin Bodák
- Adam Lapšanský
- Ľubomír Vaic
- Stanislav Jasečko
- Ladislav Karabin
- Libor Hudáček
- Denis Godla
- Pavol Skalický
- Radomír Heizer

== Team name ==
- 1932 – AC Spišská Nová Ves
- 1950 – Lokomotíva Spišská Nová Ves
- 1964 – Lokomotíva – Bane Spišská Nová Ves
- 1973 – Železničiar – Stavbár Spišská Nová Ves
- 1982 – Geológ – Stavbár Spišská Nová Ves
- 1988 – Štart Spišská Nová Ves
- 1992 – HK VTJ Spišská Nová Ves
- 2002 – HK Spišská Nová Ves
- 2009 – HK Noves okná Spišská Nová Ves
- 2010 – HK Spišská Nová Ves – current
