= 2020–21 Slovak Extraliga season =

- League: Slovak Extraliga
- Sport: Ice hockey
- Duration: 2 October 2020 – 21 March 2021; (Regular season); 24 March – 6 May 2021 (playoffs)
- Number of games: 50
- Number of teams: 12

Regular season
- League Champion: HKM Zvolen
- Top scorer: Marcel Haščák (Poprad); (69 points)

Playoffs
- Playoffs MVP: Dávid Skokan (Poprad)

Finals
- Champions: HKM Zvolen
- Runners-up: HK Poprad

Slovak Extraliga seasons
- ← 2019–20 2021–22 →

The 2020–21 Slovak Extraliga season was the 28th season of the Slovak Extraliga, the highest ice hockey league in Slovakia. The league also includes one team from Hungary.

== Team changes ==
After two seasons in Slovak Extraliga, the Hungarian team MAC Budapest left the league to participate in the Erste Liga. The reason for this decision was the uncertain financial situation, as the Hungarian government has suspended subsidies for sports clubs due to the coronavirus pandemic and MAC is also having difficulties finding other sponsors.

== Regular season ==
=== Standings ===
Each team played 50 games: playing each of the other eleven teams four times – 2x at home, 2x away (44 games) and during the Christmas holidays (22.12.2020 – 6.1.2021) each team played the inserted matches within the region 1x at home, 1x away = 6 games.

Points were awarded for each game, where three points were awarded for winning in regulation time, two points for winning in overtime or shootout, one point for losing in overtime or shootout, and zero points for losing in regulation time. At the end of the regular season, the team that finished with the most points was crowned the league champion.

Pos	Team	Pld	W	OTW	OTL	L	GF	GA	GD	Pts	Qualification
1	Zvolen	50	27	8	6	9	179	125	+54	103	Qualification to Quarter-finals
2	Michalovce	50	27	7	4	12	155	113	+42	99	Qualification to Quarter-finals
3	Poprad	50	26	7	3	14	186	133	+53	95	Qualification to Quarter-finals
4	Slovan Bratislava	50	26	6	4	14	146	115	+31	94	Qualification to Quarter-finals
5	Nitra	50	25	3	8	14	163	156	+7	89	Qualification to Quarter-finals
6	Detva	50	22	4	6	18	156	144	+12	80	Qualification to Quarter-finals
7	Trenčín	50	21	6	4	19	169	134	+35	79	Qualification to Wild card round
8	Košice	50	19	7	4	20	148	128	+20	75	Qualification to Wild card round
9	Nové Zámky	50	14	6	7	23	132	140	−8	61	Qualification to Wild card round
10	Banská Bystrica	50	14	5	5	26	135	171	−36	57	Qualification to Wild card round
11	Miskolc	50	11	3	8	28	118	181	−63	47	
12	Liptovský Mikuláš	50	6	0	3	41	105	252	−147	18	

Source: Tipos Extraliga
Rules for classification: 1) Points; 2) Head-to-head points.

== Statistics ==
=== Scoring leaders ===
The following shows the top ten players who led the league in points, at the conclusion of the regular season.

Player	Team	GP	G	A	Pts	+/–	PIM
(Slovakia) Marcel Haščák	HK Poprad	48	38	31	69	+18	24
(Slovakia) Patrik Svitana	HK Poprad	49	20	36	56	+21	22
(Slovakia) Michal Chovan	HC Košice	45	12	44	56	+8	22
(Slovakia) Marek Tvrdoň	HK Nitra	50	23	31	54	−3	64
(Slovakia) Dávid Skokan	HK Poprad	49	18	34	52	+29	107
(Sweden) Carl Ackered	HK Dukla Trenčín	50	17	35	52	+8	34
(Slovakia) Radovan Bondra	HKM Zvolen	49	26	25	51	+24	83
(Slovakia) Marek Slovák	HK Nitra	50	18	31	49	+8	46
(Finland) Mikko Nuutinen	HKM Zvolen	49	18	31	49	+11	72
(Czech Republic) Pavel Klhůfek	HC Košice	47	31	17	48	+13	58

=== Leading goaltenders ===
The following shows the top ten goaltenders who led the league in goals against average, provided that they have played at least 40% of their team's minutes, at the conclusion of the regular season.

Player	Team	GP	TOI	W	L	GA	SO	Sv%	GAA
(United States) Tyler Parks	HC Slovan Bratislava	24	1400:32	18	6	40	5	93.97	1.71
(Slovakia) Tomáš Tomek	HK Dukla Michalovce	43	2479:52	28	15	86	4	92.82	2.08
(Slovakia) Dominik Riečický	HC Košice	23	1180:56	10	13	45	2	92.46	2.29
(Sweden) Robin Rahm	HKM Zvolen	41	2487:49	27	14	98	1	92.14	2.36
(Finland) Henri Kiviaho	HC Nové Zámky	43	2609:55	18	25	113	2	91.51	2.60
(Czech Republic) Tomáš Vošvrda	HK Poprad	41	2409:16	26	15	105	2	90.81	2.61
(Czech Republic) Jakub Sedláček	HC Košice	23	1288:51	13	10	57	2	90.98	2.65
(Slovakia) Filip Belányi	HC '05 Banská Bystrica	25	1396:39	12	13	63	2	91.04	2.71
(Slovakia) Roman Petrík	HC 07 Detva	22	1193:40	12	10	54	2	92.33	2.71
(United States) Tomas Sholl	HC 07 Detva	22	1245:22	11	11	58	1	92.86	2.79

== Playoffs ==
Ten teams qualify for the playoffs: the top six teams in the regular season have a bye to the quarterfinals, while teams ranked seventh to tenth meet each other (7 versus 10, 8 versus 9) in a preliminary playoff round.

=== Bracket ===
Wild-card round (best-of-5)
8	Košice	1
9	Nové Zámky	3
7	Trenčín	3
10	Banská Bystrica	1

Quarter-finals (best-of-7)
1	Zvolen	4
9	Nové Zámky	0
4	Slovan Bratislava	4
5	Nitra	1
2	Michalovce	4
7	Trenčín	2
3	Poprad	4
6	Detva	0

Semi-finals (best-of-7)
1	Zvolen	4
4	Slovan Bratislava	1
(Pairings are re-seeded after the first and second round)
2	Michalovce	2
3	Poprad	4

Finals (best-of-7)
1	Zvolen	4
3	Poprad	1

=== Wild card round ===
Trenčín – Banská Bystrica 3–1
24.3.2021	Trenčín	Banská Bystrica	4-3 SO
25.3.2021	Trenčín	Banská Bystrica	4-1
27.3.2021	Banská Bystrica	Trenčín	2-1 OT1
28.3.2021	Banská Bystrica	Trenčín	2-3 OT1
Trenčín won the series 3–1.

Košice – Nové Zámky 1–3
24.3.2021	Košice	Nové Zámky	4-1
25.3.2021	Košice	Nové Zámky	1-2
27.3.2021	Nové Zámky	Košice	5-1
28.3.2021	Nové Zámky	Košice	3-1
Nové Zámky won the series 3–1.

=== Quarterfinals ===
Zvolen – Nové Zámky 4–0
2.4.2021	Zvolen	Nové Zámky	3-2
3.4.2021	Zvolen	Nové Zámky	4-1
6.4.2021	Nové Zámky	Zvolen	2-4
7.4.2021	Nové Zámky	Zvolen	3-6
Zvolen won the series 4–0.

Poprad – Detva 4–0
31.3.2021	Poprad	Detva	6-3
1.4.2021	Poprad	Detva	4-3
4.4.2021	Detva	Poprad	1-2
5.4.2021	Detva	Poprad	1-3
Poprad won the series 4–0.

Michalovce – Trenčín 4–2
2.4.2021	Michalovce	Trenčín	5-4
3.4.2021	Michalovce	Trenčín	2-4
6.4.2021	Trenčín	Michalovce	1-2
7.4.2021	Trenčín	Michalovce	4-5
9.4.2021	Michalovce	Trenčín	1-3
11.4.2021	Trenčín	Michalovce	1-2 OT1
Michalovce won the series 4–2.

Slovan Bratislava – Nitra 4–1
31.3.2021	Slovan Bratislava	Nitra	5-0
1.4.2021	Slovan Bratislava	Nitra	4-1
4.4.2021	Nitra	Slovan Bratislava	2-3
5.4.2021	Nitra	Slovan Bratislava	8-2
8.4.2021	Slovan Bratislava	Nitra	5-1
Slovan Bratislava won the series 4–1.

=== Semifinals ===
Zvolen – Slovan Bratislava 4–1
13.4.2021	Zvolen	Slovan Bratislava	3-2 SO
14.4.2021	Zvolen	Slovan Bratislava	2-3 OT1
17.4.2021	Slovan Bratislava	Zvolen	2-5
18.4.2021	Slovan Bratislava	Zvolen	2-4
21.4.2021	Zvolen	Slovan Bratislava	2-1 OT1
Zvolen won the series 4–1.

Michalovce – Poprad 2–4
15.4.2021	Michalovce	Poprad	3-1
16.4.2021	Michalovce	Poprad	3-2 SO
19.4.2021	Poprad	Michalovce	2-1
20.4.2021	Poprad	Michalovce	5-2
22.4.2021	Michalovce	Poprad	2-3 OT1
24.4.2021	Poprad	Michalovce	3-1
Poprad won the series 4–2.

=== Finals ===
29 April 2021; 18:00	Zvolen	5–3 (1–2, 2–1, 2–0) score in the series: 1–0	Poprad	Zvolen Ice Stadium, Zvolen; Attendance: 300

Game reference

Robin Rahm
Goalies
Tomáš Vošvrda
Referees:
Vladimír Baluška
Peter Stano
Linesmen:
Tomáš Gegáň
Daniel Konc, Jr.

Stupka (Jedlička, Kubka) – 04:52	1–0
	1–1	05:21 – Skokan (Haščák, Svitana)
	1–2	06:24 – Tavi (Livingston, Zagrapan)
Puliš (McPherson, Ivan) – 22:07	2–2
Kelemen (Kotvan, Mikúš) (PP) – 29:54	3–2
	3–3	37:25 – Drgoň (Vandas)
Stupka (Viedenský) – 56:56	4–3
McPherson (Betker) – 59:43	5–3

6 min
Penalties
10 min
44
Shots
28

30 April 2021; 18:00	Zvolen	4–3 OT (1–2, 1–1, 1–0) (OT: 1–0) score in the series: 2–0	Poprad	Zvolen Ice Stadium, Zvolen; Attendance: 300

Game reference

Robin Rahm
Goalies
Peter Hamerlík
Referees:
Daniel Konc, Jr.
Jozef Tvrdoň
Linesmen:
Lukáš Kacej
Matúš Stanzel

	0–1	02:32 – Bjalončík (Paločko)
	0–2	05:09 – Paločko
Bondra (Stupka, Hraško) – 19:01	1–2
Ivan (Nuutinen, McPherson) – 21:15	2–2
	2–3	32:39 – Mashinter (Svitana)
Marcinek (Kotvan, Tibenský) – 55:44	3–3
Bondra – 65:19	4–3

35 min
Penalties
31 min
40
Shots
30

3 May 2021; 18:00	Poprad	1–2 OT (0–0, 1–1, 0–0) (OT: 0–1) score in the series: 0–3	Zvolen	Poprad Ice Stadium, Poprad; Attendance: 341

Game reference

Peter Hamerlík
Goalies
Robin Rahm
Referees:
Daniel Konc, Jr.
Milan Novák
Linesmen:
Šimon Synek
Peter Jedlička

	0–1	27:20 – McPherson (Halama, Bondra) (PP)
Dalhuisen (Livingston, Tavi) – 28:59	1–1
	1–2	68:52 – Melancon (Ivan, Stupka)

8 min
Penalties
8 min
40
Shots
32

4 May 2021; 18:00	Poprad	7–4 (0–1, 4–1, 3–2) score in the series: 1–3	Zvolen	Poprad Ice Stadium, Poprad; Attendance: 341

Game reference

Tomáš Vošvrda
Goalies
Robin Rahm
Referees:
Peter Stano
Jozef Tvrdoň
Linesmen:
Daniel Konc, Jr.
Lukáš Kacej

	0–1	17:21 – Melancon (Nuutinen, McPherson) (PP2)
Haščák (Vandas) – 23:29	1–1
Haščák (Skokan, Svitana) (PP) – 24:44	2–1
	2–2	26:20 – Viedenský (Bondra, Kubka)
Vandas (Preisinger, Demo) – 36:05	3–2
Skokan (Haščák, Handlovský) – 36:48	4–2
Bjalončík (Demo, Livingston) – 45:11	5–2
	5–3	54:10 – Nuutinen (Meliško, McPherson)
	5–4	54:40 – Viedenský (Bondra, Nuutinen)
Livingston (Hudec, Bjalončík) – 54:56	6–4
Handlovský (Preisinger) – 58:47 (ENG)	7–4

43 min
Penalties
22 min
43
Shots
31

6 May 2021; 17:30	Zvolen	3–2 (1–1, 1–0, 1–1) score in the series: 4–1	Poprad	Zvolen Ice Stadium, Zvolen; Attendance: 512

Game reference

Robin Rahm
Goalies
Tomáš Vošvrda
Referees:
Daniel Konc, Jr.
Milan Novák
Linesmen:
Lukáš Kacej
Šimon Synek

McPherson (Nuutinen, Mikúš) – 08:51	1–0
	1–1	09:51 – Bjalončík (Brejčák, Vandas)
Bondra (McPherson, Hraško) (PP) – 32:25	2–1
McPherson (Betker) (PP) – 54:10	3–1
	3–2	58:43 – Livingston (Svitana, Haščák)

10 min
Penalties
43 min
29
Shots
35

== Final rankings ==
Gold medal	Zvolen
Silver medal	Poprad
Bronze medal	Michalovce
4	Slovan Bratislava
5	Nitra
6	Detva
7	Trenčín
8	Nové Zámky
9	Košice
10	Banská Bystrica
11	Miskolc
12	Liptovský Mikuláš
