= HC Košice =

- Nickname: Oceliari
- League: Slovak Extraliga
- Founded: 1920; 106 years ago
- Home arena: Steel Arena (capacity: 8,378)
- Colours: Black, white, orange
- President: Juraj Mondík
- Head coach: Dan Ceman
- Captain: Michal Chovan
- Website: hckosice.sk

Hockey Club Košice is a Slovak professional ice hockey club based in Košice that competes in the Slovak Extraliga, the top tier of Slovak ice hockey. It is the most successful hockey club in Slovakia and the former Czechoslovakia, having won the Tipos Extraliga ten times, the Czechoslovak First Ice Hockey League twice, the 1st. Slovak National Hockey League once, the IIHF Continental Cup once, the Tatra Cup 11 times, and the Rona Cup four times. The club is nicknamed "Oceliari" ("Steelers" in English). The team plays at the Steel Arena in Košice.

== History ==
Logo of HC Košice from 1962 to 1998

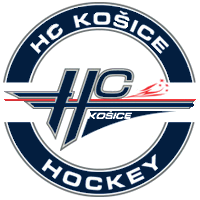
The previous HC Košice logo

The club was established in Košice in 1962 as an army hockey club called TJ Dukla Košice. At that time, there were two weak regional ice hockey clubs in the city. The new club was much stronger and joined the Czechoslovak Hockey League within two years. In 1966, Dukla changed its name to TJ VSŽ Košice. In 1986, the club became the Ice Hockey Champions of Czechoslovakia for the first time, beating HC Dukla Jihlava in the finals. It won again in 1988, beating HC Sparta Prague. At that time, the club was the second-best ice hockey club in Europe after CSKA Moscow. After Czechoslovakia split into the Czech Republic and Slovakia in 1993, VSŽ Košice became a member of the Slovak Extraliga, which it soon went on to win three times. In 1998, the club changed its name to HC Košice.

On 24 February 2006, Košice left Lokomotíva Košice Stadium and moved to the newly constructed Steel Aréna. The arena is named in honour of the club's sponsor, U. S. Steel Košice, and is also known as L. Troják Stadium after one of the club's most popular players. Košice won the league for the fourth time by defeating HK 36 Skalica to end the 2008–09 season. A victory over HC Slovan Bratislava at the end of the 2009–10 season saw the club win the league for the second year in a row and the fifth time in total, which it followed up by beating HK Poprad in the finals of the 2010–11 season to secure the league for the third year in a row (the first "hat trick" in the league's history) and the sixth time in total. Košice qualified for the finals for the sixth time in a row at the 2012–13 season, but suffered a loss to HKm Zvolen. A victory over HK Nitra in the finals of the 2013–14 season led Košice to its seventh league victory. The club won its eighth and most recent league during the 2014–15 season, defeating HC '05 Banská Bystrica in the finals.

== Honours ==
=== Domestic ===
Slovak Extraliga

- (gold) Winners (10): 1994–95, 1995–96, 1998–99, 2008–09, 2009–10, 2010–11, 2013–14, 2014–15, 2022–23, 2024–25
- (silver) Runners-up (7): 1993–94, 1996–97, 1997–98, 2002–03, 2007–08, 2011–12, 2012–13
- (bronze) 3rd place (3): 2001–02, 2006–07, 2015–16

Czechoslovak Extraliga

- (gold) Winners (2): 1985–86, 1987–88
- (silver) Runners-up (1): 1984–85
- (bronze) 3rd place (1): 1988–89

1st. Slovak National Hockey League

- (gold) Winners (1): 1963–64

=== International ===
IIHF European Cup

- (silver) Runners-up (2): 1986–87, 1988–89

IIHF Continental Cup

- (gold) Winners (1): 1997–98
- (silver) Runners-up (1): 1998–99

IIHF Super Cup

- (silver) Runners-up (1): 1998

=== Pre-season ===
Tatra Cup

- (gold) Winners (11): 1978, 1979, 1982, 1986, 1987, 1988, 1992, 1993, 2008, 2017, 2024

Rona Cup

- (gold) Winners (4): 1995, 1996, 2009, 2013

== Players ==
=== Current roster ===
As of 23 November 2024.

No.	Nat	Player	Pos	S/G	Age	Acquired	Birthplace
93	(Canada)	Olivier Archambault	LW	L	33	2024	Le Gardeur, Quebec, Canada
61	(Slovakia)	Marek Bartánus (A)	RW	R	39	2021	Liptovský Mikuláš, Czechoslovakia
55	(Slovakia)	Antonin Bartoš	D	R	22	2022	České Budějovice, Czech Republic
91	(Slovakia)	Michal Chovan (C)	LW	L	38	2019	Zvolen, Czechoslovakia
18	(Slovakia)	Radek Deyl (A)	D	L	37	2020	Košice, Czechoslovakia
89	(Czech Republic)	Jakub Ferenc (A)	D	R	37	2022	Levoča, Czechoslovakia
56	(United States)	Max Gildon	D	L	27	2024	Houston, Texas, United States
24	(Slovakia)	Matúš Havrila	C	L	27	2020	Košice, Slovakia
32	(Slovakia)	Jaroslav Janus	G	L	37	2022	Prešov, Czechoslovakia
84	(Finland)	Joona Jääskeläinen	LW	R	30	2022	Imatra, Finland
82	(Slovakia)	Dávid Kohút	C	L	28	2024	Handlová, Slovakia
72	(Slovakia)	Filip Krivošík	C	R	27	2023	Bratislava, Slovakia
63	(Slovakia)	Patrik Lamper	LW	L	33	2022	Banská Bystrica, Slovakia
47	(Slovakia)	Mário Lunter	LW	L	32	2023	Banská Bystrica, Slovakia
12	(Canada)	Danick Martel	LW	L	31	2024	Drummondville, Quebec, Canada
23	(Slovakia)	Tomáš Mikúš	C	L	33	2023	Skalica, Slovakia
6	(Canada)	Blake Parlett	D	R	37	2024	Bracebridge, Ontario, Canada
8	(Slovakia)	Simon Petras	RW	R	30	2024	Bratislava, Slovakia
39	(Canada)	Brett Pollock	C	L	30	2022	Regina, Saskatchewan, Canada
20	(Slovakia)	Peter Repčík	C	L	22	2024	Košice, Slovakia
33	(Slovakia)	Dominik Riečický	G	L	34	2020	Košice, Czechoslovakia
77	(Slovakia)	Patrik Rogon	RW	L	30	2021	Žilina, Slovakia
44	(Slovakia)	Mislav Rosandić	D	L	31	2024	Zagreb, Croatia
71	(Slovakia)	Eduard Šedivý	D	L	34	2021	Myjava, Czechoslovakia
92	(Slovakia)	Eduard Šimun	C	L	31	2023	Topoľčany, Slovakia
62	(Canada)	Josh Teves	D	L	31	2024	Calgary, Alberta, Canada

== Notable players ==
- Ladislav Troják
- Jiří Holeček
- Bedřich Brunclík
- Vincent Lukáč
- Igor Liba
- Jaromír Dragan
- Jiří Bicek
- Ľubomír Vaic
- Marek Svatoš
- Juraj Faith
- Rudolf Huna
- Peter Bartoš
- Martin Štrbák
- Miroslav Zálešák
- Rastislav Staňa
- Ladislav Nagy
- Peter Bondra
- Peter Ihnačák
- Miroslav Ihnačák
- Ján Lašák
- Arne Kroták
- Ivan Droppa
- Jerguš Bača
- Stanislav Gron
- Martin Marinčin
- Tomáš Jurčo
- Ján Laco
- Erik Černák

Preceded by HC Dukla Jihlava	Czechoslovak Extraliga; Champions; 1985–86	Succeeded by Tesla Pardubice
Preceded by Tesla Pardubice	Czechoslovak Extraliga; Champions; 1987–88	Succeeded by Tesla Pardubice
Preceded by HK Dukla Trenčín	Slovak Extraliga; Champions; 1994–95	Succeeded by HC Košice
Preceded by HC Košice	Slovak Extraliga; Champions; 1995–96	Succeeded by HK Dukla Trenčín
Preceded by HC Slovan Bratislava	Slovak Extraliga; Champions; 1998–99	Succeeded by HC Slovan Bratislava
Preceded by HC Slovan Bratislava	Slovak Extraliga; Champions; 2008–09	Succeeded by HC Košice
Preceded by HC Košice	Slovak Extraliga; Champions; 2009–10	Succeeded by HC Košice
Preceded by HC Košice	Slovak Extraliga; Champions; 2010–11	Succeeded by HC Slovan Bratislava
Preceded by HKM Zvolen	Slovak Extraliga; Champions; 2013–14	Succeeded by HC Košice
Preceded by HC Košice	Slovak Extraliga; Champions; 2014–15	Succeeded by HK Nitra
Preceded by HC Slovan Bratislava	Slovak Extraliga; Champions; 2022–23	Succeeded by HK Nitra
