= Gord Stafford =

Canadian ice hockey player

- Born: October 10, 1960 (age 65) Banff, Alberta, Canada
- Height: 5 ft 10 in (178 cm)
- Weight: 180 lb (82 kg; 12 st 12 lb)
- Position: Centre
- Shot: Left
- Played for: Milwaukee Admirals (IHL); Wichita Wind (CHL)
- NHL draft: Undrafted
- Playing career: 1980–1987

Gord Stafford (born October 10, 1960) is a Canadian former professional ice hockey player.

Stafford played major junior hockey with the Billings Bighorns of the Western Hockey League (WHL). He attended a try-out with the Edmonton Oilers of the National Hockey League prior to the start of the 1979–80 season, but was released to play out his final year of junior eligibility with the Bighorns.

He went on to play professionally for seven seasons, predominantly with the Milwaukee Admirals of the International Hockey League (IHL), where he scored 131 goals and 219 assists for 350 points, while earning 228 penalty minutes, in 355 games played, before hanging up his skates following the 1986–87 IHL season.

== Family ==
His son, Drew Stafford played in the National Hockey League.

== Career statistics ==
			Regular season					Playoffs
Season	Team	League	GP	G	A	Pts	PIM	GP	G	A	Pts	PIM
1977–78	Billings Bighorns	WCHL	59	11	22	33	54	20	4	10	14	17
1978–79	Billings Bighorns	WHL	72	37	66	103	70	8	7	6	13	2
1979–80	Billings Bighorns	WHL	68	52	58	110	91	7	0	5	5	20
1980–81	Milwaukee Admirals	IHL	40	24	32	56	30	—	—	—	—	—
1980–81	Wichita Wind	CHL	27	5	3	8	34	—	—	—	—	—
1981–82	Wichita Wind	CHL	49	9	16	25	42	—	—	—	—	—
1982–83	Milwaukee Admirals	IHL	77	23	49	72	81	—	—	—	—	—
1983–84	Milwaukee Admirals	IHL	79	36	45	81	35	—	—	—	—	—
1984–85	Milwaukee Admirals	IHL	6	0	2	2	0	—	—	—	—	—
1985–86	Milwaukee Admirals	IHL	82	20	57	77	40	—	—	—	—	—
1986–87	Milwaukee Admirals	IHL	71	28	34	62	42	—	—	—	—	—
CHL totals			76	14	19	33	76	—	—	—	—	—
IHL totals			355	131	219	350	228	—	—	—	—	—
