= Barrett Heisten =

American ice hockey player (born 1980)

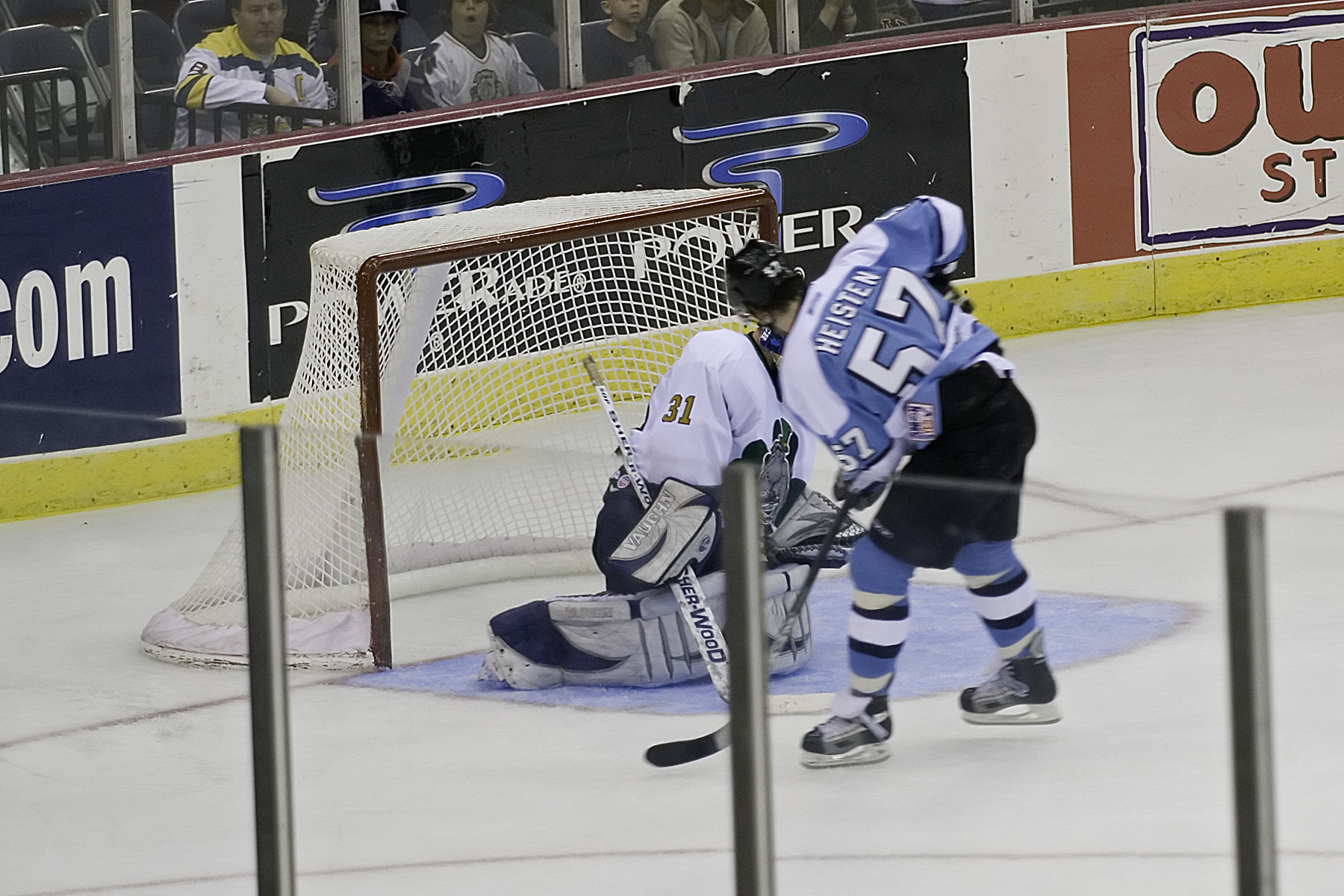
- Heisten with the Alaska Aces in March 2007
- Born: March 19, 1980 (age 46) Anchorage, Alaska, U.S.
- Height: 6 ft 0 in (183 cm)
- Weight: 192 lb (87 kg; 13 st 10 lb)
- Position: Left wing
- Shot: Left
- Played for: New York Rangers
- NHL draft: 20th overall, 1999; Buffalo Sabres
- Playing career: 2001–2008

William Barrett Heisten (born March 19, 1980) is an American former professional ice hockey forward. He played 10 games in the National Hockey League (NHL) with the New York Rangers during the 2001–02 season. The rest of his career, which lasted from 2001 to 2008, was spent in the minor leagues.

== Playing career ==
Heisten played high school hockey at Dimond High School in Anchorage.

He played college hockey at the University of Maine. He was drafted by the Buffalo Sabres in the first round with the 20th overall pick in the 1999 NHL entry draft. Having not been signed by the Sabres, the New York Rangers signed him as a free agent in 2001. He played ten games with the Rangers before being traded to the Dallas Stars along with Manny Malhotra for Martin Ručinský and Roman Lyashenko. He spent the next two years playing for the Stars' AHL team, the Utah Grizzlies. He was not re-signed, and in 2004 signed a one-year deal with New York Islanders, although he never played for them due to the lockout. In 2005, he was contemplating retirement when his brother Chris asked him to play alongside him in the ECHL for their hometown team, the Alaska Aces. He signed with the Aces and helped them win the Kelly Cup, the ECHL's championship trophy.

Heisten re-signed with the Aces heading into the 2006–07 ECHL season, and was named an alternate captain. He initially declared his retirement during the summer following that season, but decided to come back in the hope of an injury-free season. He was named captain by coach Keith McCambridge. Although his statistics were not nearly as outstanding as they had been earlier in his career, he contributed valuable leadership to the team. A healthier season, however, was not to be. He suffered a concussion in a game on December 11 in which the Aces hosted the Stockton Thunder. He returned to action during a December 19 game at Victoria, but was removed after symptoms resulting from the concussion surfaced again. After missing 15 consecutive games, Heisten announced his retirement on January 18, in consideration of his long-term health.

== Career statistics ==
=== Regular season and playoffs ===
| | | | Regular season | | | | | Playoffs |
| Season | Team | League | GP | G | A | Pts | PIM | GP | G | A | Pts | PIM |
|---|---|---|---|---|---|---|---|---|---|---|---|---|
| 1996–97 | Anchorage North Stars AAA | U18 | 39 | 35 | 29 | 64 | — | — | — | — | — | — |
| 1997–98 | US NTDP Juniors | USHL | 16 | 3 | 9 | 12 | 68 | — | — | — | — | — |
| 1997–98 | US NTDP U18 | NAHL | 6 | 1 | 5 | 6 | 74 | — | — | — | — | — |
| 1997–98 | US NTDP U18 | USDP | 28 | 7 | 12 | 19 | 103 | — | — | — | — | — |
| 1998–99 | University of Maine | HE | 34 | 12 | 16 | 28 | 72 | — | — | — | — | — |
| 1999–00 | University of Maine | HE | 37 | 13 | 24 | 37 | 86 | — | — | — | — | — |
| 2000–01 | Seattle Thunderbirds | WHL | 58 | 20 | 57 | 77 | 61 | 9 | 2 | 6 | 8 | 20 |
| 2001–02 | New York Rangers | NHL | 10 | 0 | 0 | 0 | 2 | — | — | — | — | — |
| 2001–02 | Hartford Wolf Pack | AHL | 49 | 9 | 9 | 18 | 60 | — | — | — | — | — |
| 2001–02 | Utah Grizzlies | AHL | 12 | 5 | 1 | 6 | 14 | 5 | 1 | 0 | 1 | 4 |
| 2002–03 | Utah Grizzlies | AHL | 58 | 10 | 10 | 20 | 47 | 2 | 0 | 0 | 0 | 4 |
| 2003–04 | Utah Grizzlies | AHL | 73 | 4 | 13 | 17 | 98 | — | — | — | — | — |
| 2004–05 | Bridgeport Sound Tigers | AHL | 67 | 7 | 12 | 19 | 59 | — | — | — | — | — |
| 2005–06 | Alaska Aces | ECHL | 64 | 26 | 45 | 71 | 143 | 22 | 5 | 16 | 58 |
| 2006–07 | Alaska Aces | ECHL | 60 | 17 | 33 | 50 | 121 | 12 | 1 | 7 | 8 | 8 |
| 2007–08 | Alaska Aces | ECHL | 24 | 7 | 10 | 17 | 38 | — | — | — | — | — |
| AHL totals | | | 256 | 35 | 45 | 80 | 278 | 7 | 1 | 0 | 1 | 8 |
| ECHL totals | | | 148 | 50 | 88 | 138 | 302 | 12 | 1 | 7 | 8 | 8 |
| NHL totals | | | 10 | 0 | 0 | 0 | 2 | — | — | — | — | — |

=== International ===
| Year | Team | Event | GP | G | A | Pts | PIM |
|---|---|---|---|---|---|---|---|
| 1999 | United States | WJC | 6 | 2 | 4 | 6 | 8 |
| 2000 | United States | WJC | 7 | 2 | 1 | 3 | 20 |
| Junior totals | | | 13 | 4 | 5 | 9 | 28 |

== Awards and honors ==
| Award | Year |
|---|---|
College
| All-HE Rookie Team | 1999 |

Awards and achievements
| Preceded by Dmitri Kalinin | Buffalo Sabres first-round draft pick 1999 | Succeeded by Artem Kryukov |
