= Dmitri Kalinin =

Russian ice hockey player (born 1980)

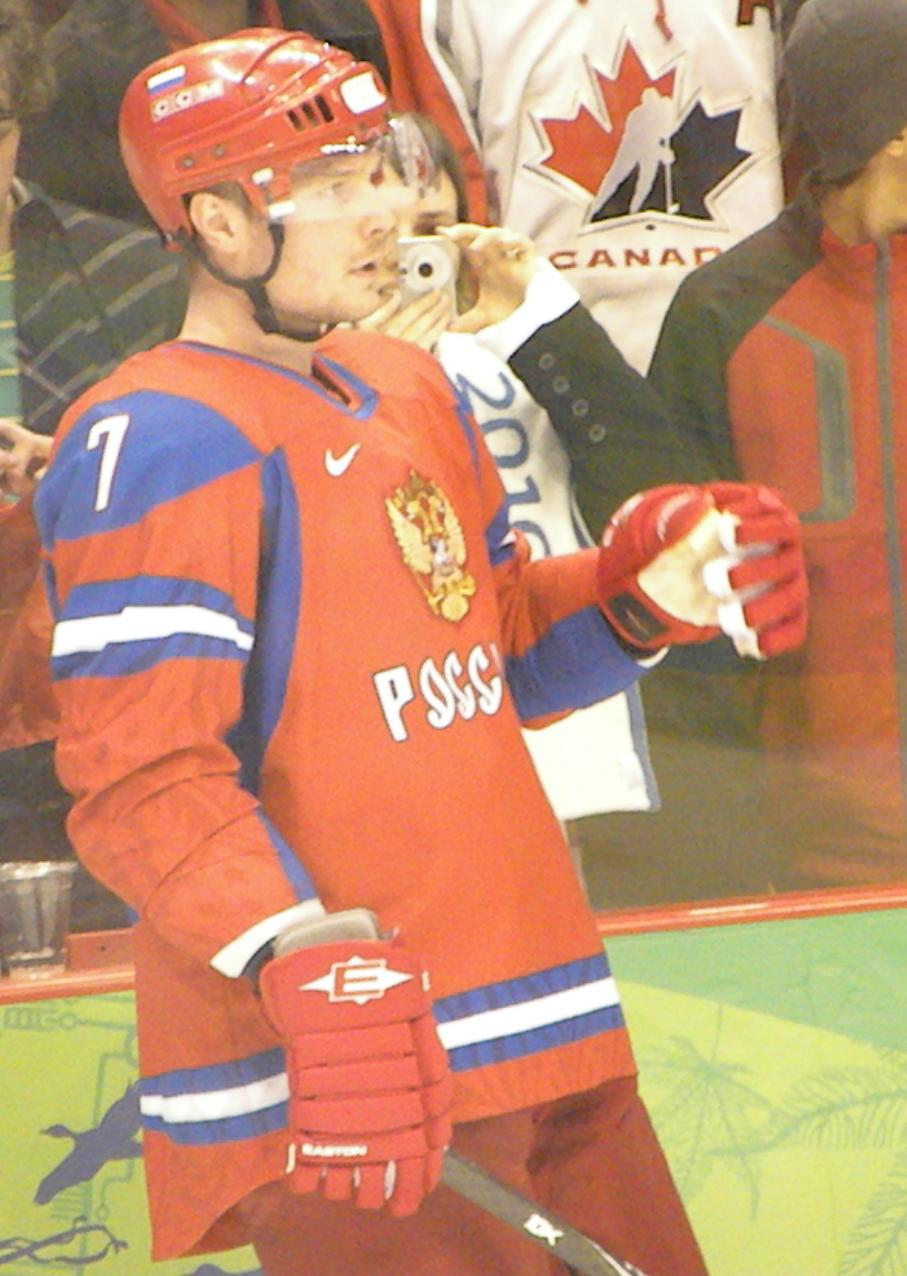
- Born: July 22, 1980 (age 46) Chelyabinsk, Russian SFSR, URS
- Height: 6 ft 3 in (191 cm)
- Weight: 206 lb (93 kg; 14 st 10 lb)
- Position: Defence
- Shot: Left
- KHL team Former teams: Free Agent; Traktor Chelyabinsk; Buffalo Sabres; Metallurg Magnitogorsk; New York Rangers; Phoenix Coyotes; Salavat Yulaev Ufa; SKA Saint Petersburg; Spartak Moscow
- National team: Russia
- NHL draft: 18th overall, 1998; Buffalo Sabres
- Playing career: 1995–2020

Dmitri Vladimirovich Kalinin (Russian: Дмитрий Владимирович Калинин; born July 22, 1980) is a Russian professional ice hockey defenceman. He most recently played for Traktor Chelyabinsk of the Kontinental Hockey League (KHL).

== Playing career ==
He was drafted by the Sabres 18th overall in the 1998 NHL entry draft. He had an injury plagued 2005–06 season, but did not miss a game in the 2006–07 season. He scored the NHL's first goal in the 2006–07 season, at 9:09 of the first period in the season opener at the Carolina Hurricanes.

Kalinin became an unrestricted free agent July 1, 2008 and two days later signed a one-year contract with the New York Rangers.

On March 4, 2009, Kalinin was traded to the Phoenix Coyotes along with Petr Průcha and Nigel Dawes for Derek Morris. On July 21, 2009, Kalinin signed a two-year contract with the Salavat Yulaev Ufa of the Kontinental Hockey League (KHL).

Kalinin was named a member of Russia's hockey team for the 2010 Winter Olympics in Vancouver, British Columbia.

Kalinin had a successful two seasons with Salavat before signing with SKA St. Petersburg. He continued his success in the KHL with SKA and gained recognition as one of the most feared defensemen in the KHL. He won KHL Defenseman of the Month multiple times, was second in KHL defensemen scoring in the 2011–12 season. Prior to the beginning of the 2012–13 season, he was named St. Petersburg's captain, after being a major factor in his team's Gagarin Cup victory the season before. His only season as captain was a success in returning SKA to the playoffs.

On July 2, 2016, Kalinin signed a one-year contract with Spartak Moscow. Kalinin remained with Spartak for three years, captaining the club in the 2018–19 season, with 11 points in 50 games from the blueline.

On May 6, 2019, Kalinin as a free agent continued his career by returning to hometown club, Traktor Chelyabinsk, on a one-year contract.

== Career statistics ==
=== Regular season and playoffs ===
			Regular season					Playoffs
Season	Team	League	GP	G	A	Pts	PIM	GP	G	A	Pts	PIM
1995–96	Traktor–2 Chelyabinsk	RUS.2	20	0	3	3	10	—	—	—	—	—
1996–97	Traktor Chelyabinsk	RSL	2	0	0	0	0	2	0	0	0	0
1996–97	Traktor–2 Chelyabinsk	RUS.3	20	0	0	0	10	—	—	—	—	—
1997–98	Traktor Chelyabinsk	RSL	26	0	2	2	24	—	—	—	—	—
1998–99	Moncton Wildcats	QMJHL	39	7	18	25	44	4	1	1	2	0
1998–99	Rochester Americans	AHL	3	0	1	1	14	7	0	0	0	6
1999–2000	Rochester Americans	AHL	75	2	19	21	52	21	2	9	11	8
1999–2000	Buffalo Sabres	NHL	4	0	0	0	4	—	—	—	—	—
2000–01	Buffalo Sabres	NHL	79	4	18	22	38	13	0	2	2	4
2001–02	Buffalo Sabres	NHL	58	2	11	13	26	—	—	—	—	—
2002–03	Rochester Americans	AHL	1	0	0	0	0	—	—	—	—	—
2002–03	Buffalo Sabres	NHL	65	8	13	21	57	—	—	—	—	—
2003–04	Buffalo Sabres	NHL	77	10	24	34	42	—	—	—	—	—
2004–05	Metallurg Magnitogorsk	RSL	48	2	8	10	14	5	0	0	0	2
2005–06	Buffalo Sabres	NHL	55	2	16	18	54	8	0	2	2	2
2006–07	Buffalo Sabres	NHL	82	7	22	29	36	16	2	3	5	14
2007–08	Buffalo Sabres	NHL	46	1	7	8	32	—	—	—	—	—
2008–09	New York Rangers	NHL	58	1	12	13	26	—	—	—	—	—
2008–09	Phoenix Coyotes	NHL	15	1	3	4	6	—	—	—	—	—
2009–10	Salavat Yulaev Ufa	KHL	53	12	10	22	32	15	2	3	5	58
2010–11	Salavat Yulaev Ufa	KHL	45	3	6	9	26	18	0	4	4	6
2011–12	SKA Saint Petersburg	KHL	52	15	20	35	14	13	5	5	10	6
2012–13	SKA Saint Petersburg	KHL	48	5	23	28	26	11	0	6	6	2
2013–14	SKA Saint Petersburg	KHL	51	10	14	24	28	6	0	3	3	4
2014–15	SKA Saint Petersburg	KHL	54	6	8	14	30	11	0	1	1	6
2015–16	SKA Saint Petersburg	KHL	44	5	4	9	43	2	0	0	0	2
2016–17	Spartak Moscow	KHL	45	7	5	12	45	—	—	—	—	—
2017–18	Spartak Moscow	KHL	55	5	16	21	28	3	0	0	0	0
2018–19	Spartak Moscow	KHL	50	2	9	11	14	6	1	0	1	2
2019–20	Traktor Chelyabinsk	KHL	45	4	6	10	18	—	—	—	—	—
NHL totals			539	36	126	162	321	37	2	7	9	20
KHL totals			542	74	121	195	304	85	8	22	30	86

=== International ===
Year	Team	Event	Result	GP	G	A	Pts	PIM
1998	Russia	EJC	3rd place, bronze medalist(s)	6	0	2	2	6
2002	Russia	WC	2nd place, silver medalist(s)	9	0	1	1	4
2003	Russia	WC	5th	7	1	0	1	4
2004	Russia	WC	10th	6	0	1	1	2
2004	Russia	WCH	5th	3	0	0	0	0
2005	Russia	WC	3rd place, bronze medalist(s)	9	0	0	0	0
2008	Russia	WC	1st place, gold medalist(s)	9	1	2	3	4
2009	Russia	WC	1st place, gold medalist(s)	9	2	3	5	4
2010	Russia	OG	6th	4	1	1	2	0
2010	Russia	WC	2nd place, silver medalist(s)	9	0	1	1	0
2011	Russia	WC	4th	9	0	3	3	4
2012	Russia	WC	1st place, gold medalist(s)	5	1	3	4	25
Senior totals				79	6	15	21	47

Awards and achievements
Preceded by Mika Noronen	Buffalo Sabres first-round draft pick 1998	Succeeded by Barrett Heisten
