= Marek Zagrapan =

Slovak ice hockey player (born 1986)

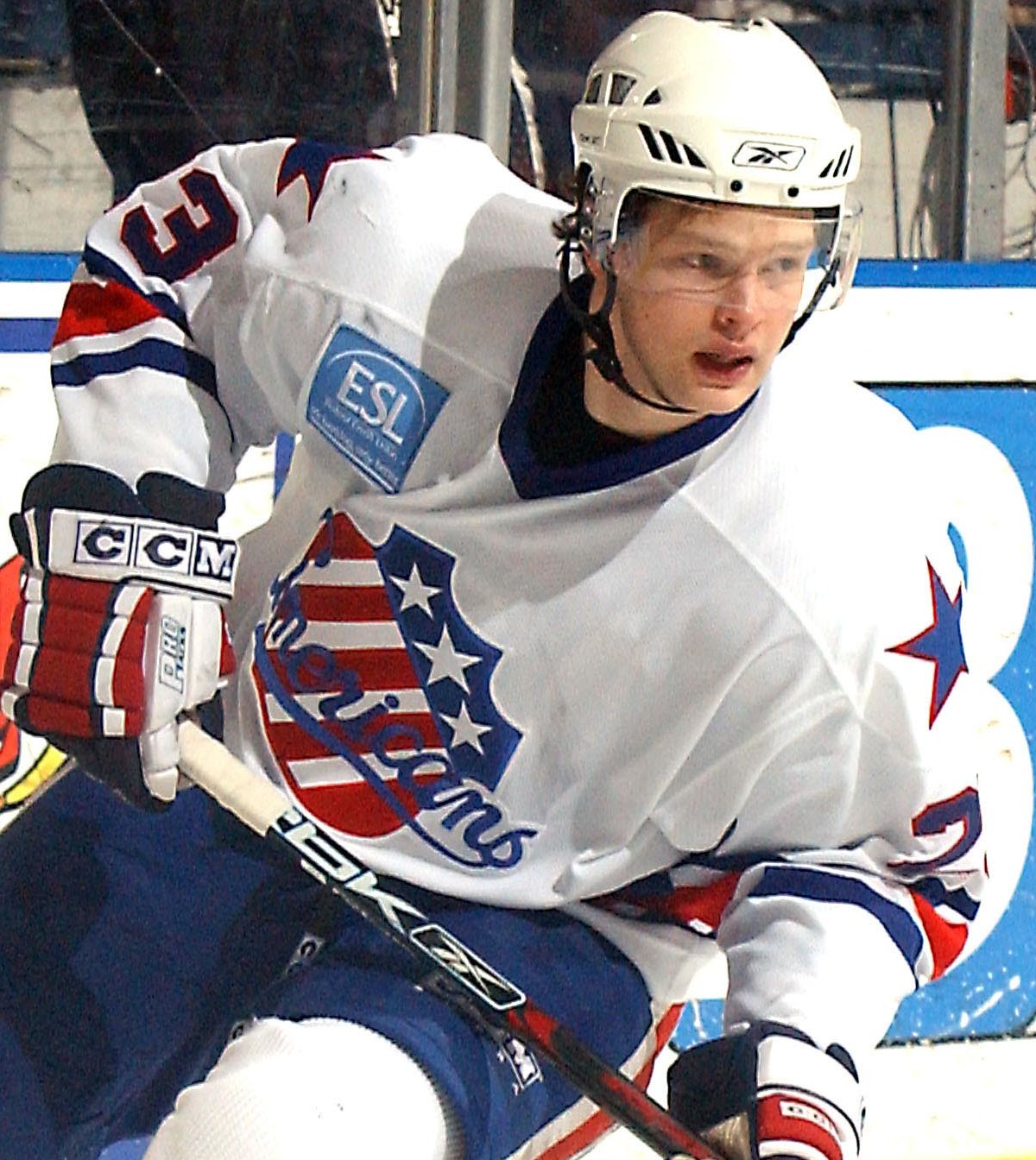
- Zagrapan with the Rochester Americans in 2007
- Born: 6 December 1986 (age 39) Prešov, Czechoslovakia
- Height: 6 ft 1 in (185 cm)
- Weight: 195 lb (88 kg; 13 st 13 lb)
- Position: Centre
- Shot: Left
- Played for: HC Zlín; HC Kometa Brno; Rochester Americans; Portland Pirates; Severstal Cherepovets; Yugra Khanty-Mansiysk; HC Oceláři Třinec; HPK; Kiekko-Vantaa; Rytíři Kladno; Graz 99ers Dornbirner EC; HK Poprad; EHC Winterthur; HC 21 Prešov; Briançon
- National team: Slovakia
- NHL draft: 13th overall, 2005; Buffalo Sabres
- Playing career: 2003–2023

Marek Zagrapan (born 6 December 1986) is a Slovak professional ice hockey centre.

He was drafted by the National Hockey League (NHL)'s Buffalo Sabres in the first round, 13th overall, at the 2005 NHL entry draft.

== Playing career ==
Zagrapan was drafted by the Buffalo Sabres in the first round, 13th overall, in the 2005 NHL entry draft. After playing two seasons in the Czech Extraliga with HC Zlín, Zagrapan came to North America after HC Zlín became Czech champions in 2004. He then played two seasons in the Quebec Major Junior Hockey League (QMJHL) with the Chicoutimi Saguenéens.

On 12 September 2006, Zagrapan signed an entry-level contract with Buffalo and spent the 2006–07 and 2007–08 seasons with their American Hockey League (AHL) affiliate, the Rochester Americans. Zagrapan then spent the 2008–09 season with the new affiliate of the Sabres, the Portland Pirates.

On 29 May 2009, Zagrapan returned to Europe to play professionally, citing a lack of opportunity with the Sabres due to his low scoring output; he signed with Severstal Cherepovets of the Kontinental Hockey League (KHL) on a three-year contract.

In the 2014–15 season, Zagrapan joined Austrian club Graz 99ers of the Austrian Hockey League (EBEL) on an initial try-out contract on 20 September 2014. Zagrapan impressed with Graz to earn a one-year contract for the remainder of the campaign. In 51 games with the club, he produced 9 goals and 30 points.

On 13 July 2015, Zagrapan left Graz as a free agent for League rivals Dornbirner EC.

== Career statistics ==
=== Regular season and playoffs ===
			Regular season					Playoffs
Season	Team	League	GP	G	A	Pts	PIM	GP	G	A	Pts	PIM
2002–03	HC Hamé Zlín	CZE U18	14	18	13	31	14	3	1	0	1	6
2002–03	HC Hamé Zlín	CZE U20	23	9	13	22	14	—	—	—	—	—
2002–03	HC Hamé Zlín	ELH	13	1	1	2	10	—	—	—	—	—
2003–04	HC Hamé Zlín	CZE U20	42	23	12	35	42	7	1	3	4	4
2003–04	HC Hamé Zlín	ELH	5	0	0	0	0	—	—	—	—	—
2003–04	HC Kometa Brno	CZE.2	5	0	1	1	0	—	—	—	—	—
2004–05	Chicoutimi Saguenéens	QMJHL	59	32	50	82	50	17	11	6	17	28
2005–06	Chicoutimi Saguenéens	QMJHL	59	35	52	87	25	8	4	6	10	4
2006–07	Rochester Americans	AHL	71	17	21	38	39	6	1	0	1	2
2007–08	Rochester Americans	AHL	76	18	22	40	66	—	—	—	—	—
2008–09	Portland Pirates	AHL	80	21	28	49	44	5	2	1	3	2
2009–10	Severstal Cherepovets	KHL	51	10	6	16	40	—	—	—	—	—
2010–11	Yugra Khanty-Mansiysk	KHL	18	3	2	5	6	—	—	—	—	—
2010–11	HC Oceláři Třinec	ELH	18	3	2	5	2	9	0	3	3	2
2011–12	HPK	SM-l	24	2	4	6	10	—	—	—	—	—
2011–12	Kiekko-Vantaa	Mestis	1	0	0	0	0	—	—	—	—	—
2012–13	HC Oceláři Třinec	ELH	39	5	9	14	8	11	2	3	5	0
2013–14	HC Oceláři Třinec	ELH	25	5	3	8	16	—	—	—	—	—
2013–14	Rytíři Kladno	ELH	16	2	1	3	6	—	—	—	—	—
2014–15	Graz 99ers	EBEL	51	9	21	30	24	—	—	—	—	—
2015–16	Dornbirner EC	EBEL	54	9	22	31	24	6	2	1	3	6
2016–17	HK Poprad	Slovak	54	15	21	36	38	4	0	0	0	0
2017–18	EHC Winterthur	NLB	32	11	10	21	45	—	—	—	—	—
2018–19	HK Poprad	Slovak	56	15	21	36	22	12	1	5	6	4
2019–20	HK Poprad	Slovak	55	21	23	44	18	—	—	—	—	—
2020–21	HK Poprad	Slovak	43	7	14	21	12	15	1	5	6	4
2021–22	HC 21 Prešov	Slovak	48	6	9	15	18	4	0	0	0	0
ELH totals			116	16	16	32	42	20	2	6	8	2
AHL totals			227	56	71	127	149	11	3	1	4	4
Slovak totals			256	64	88	152	108	35	2	10	12	8

=== International ===
Medal record

Men's ice hockey

Representing Slovakia

World U18 Championships
Silver medal – second place	2003 Russia	

Year	Team	Event	Result	GP	G	A	Pts	PIM
2003	Slovakia	WJC18	2nd place, silver medalist(s)	7	0	0	0	0
2004	Slovakia	WJC18	6th	6	4	4	8	8
2005	Slovakia	WJC	7th	4	1	2	3	6
2006	Slovakia	WJC	8th	6	2	5	7	18
2010	Slovakia	WC	12th	6	2	0	2	2
Junior totals				23	7	11	18	32
Senior totals				6	2	0	2	2

Awards and achievements
Preceded by Drew Stafford	Buffalo Sabres first-round draft pick 2005	Succeeded by Dennis Persson
