= Tyler Myers =

Canadian ice hockey player (born 1990)

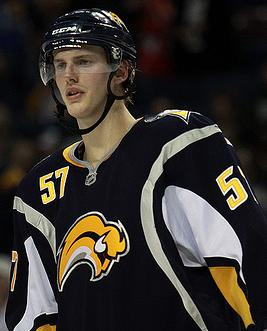
- Myers with the Buffalo Sabres in 2009
- Born: February 1, 1990 (age 36) Houston, Texas, U.S.
- Height: 6 ft 8 in (203 cm)
- Weight: 229 lb (104 kg; 16 st 5 lb)
- Position: Defence
- Shoots: Right
- NHL team Former teams: Dallas Stars; Buffalo Sabres; EC KAC; Winnipeg Jets; Vancouver Canucks
- National team: Canada
- NHL draft: 12th overall, 2008; Buffalo Sabres
- Playing career: 2009–present

Tyler Paul Myers (born February 1, 1990) is a Canadian–American professional ice hockey player who is a defenceman for the Dallas Stars of the National Hockey League (NHL). He was drafted by the Buffalo Sabres in the first round, 12th overall, in the 2008 NHL entry draft. At the end of the 2009–10 season, Myers won the Calder Memorial Trophy as the NHL's best rookie. Standing at 6 ft 8 in (203 cm) tall, he is one of the tallest active players in the NHL, and was nicknamed "the Big Easy" or "Big Tex" when he started his NHL career, because he was born in Houston. After moving to Vancouver, Myers earned the nickname "Chaos Giraffe" from fans, though he has since distanced himself from the nickname after moving to Dallas.

Born in Houston, Myers grew up in Calgary. Internationally he represented Canada, and has won gold medals at the 2008 IIHF World U18 Championships, 2009 World Junior Championships, and 2023 IIHF World Championships.

== Playing career ==
=== Junior ===
In the 2005 Western Hockey League (WHL) Bantam Draft, Myers was the Kelowna Rockets first round selection, 19th overall. Prior to playing in the WHL, Myers continued minor hockey at Athol Murray College of Notre Dame with the Hounds, a AAA midget team. Myers began his major junior career with the Rockets in 2005–06. Following his NHL draft year in 2007–08, Myers was ranked fourth among North American draft-eligible skaters by the NHL's Central Scouting Services.

He was selected 12th overall by the Buffalo Sabres in the 2008 NHL entry draft, after they traded the Los Angeles Kings a third-round pick to move up from the 13th spot. The following season, Myers helped the Rockets to a 2009 Ed Chynoweth Cup championship following a junior career-high 42-point regular season. Scoring 20 points during the Rockets playoff run, Myers was instrumental the franchise's third WHL title and was selected as the WHL Playoff MVP. Following Myers' WHL championship win with the Rockets, he was signed to a three-year, entry-level contract with the Buffalo Sabres on May 11, 2009.

=== Professional ===
==== Buffalo Sabres ====
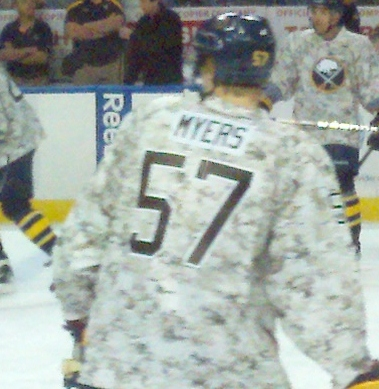
Myers warming up prior to a game on Veterans Day 2011

Myers started the 2009–10 season with the Buffalo Sabres. He recorded his first NHL point, an assist, on October 8, 2009, against the Phoenix Coyotes. Eight days later, Myers scored his first NHL goal against Dwayne Roloson of the New York Islanders. It was also his first multi-point game, as he recorded an assist as well. On October 24, Myers was used in the sixth round of a shootout against the Tampa Bay Lightning and scored the game winner. After a strong first nine games with the Sabres, the club decided to keep him in Buffalo rather than return him to the Rockets, initiating the first year of his contract.

Myers quickly established himself as the top defenseman on the Sabres roster, leading the club in average ice time per game in his rookie season. On December 16, 2009, he registered 28:32 of ice time in a regulation loss to the Ottawa Senators despite being one of a much-publicized group of Sabres players struck with food poisoning the night before. The following month, Myers recorded his first multi-goal game on January 8, 2010. He scored twice on the powerplay, including the game-winner, as the Sabres beat the Toronto Maple Leafs 3–2. He also assisted Tim Kennedy on the Sabres' first goal.

Scoring 10 points and leading all rookies in average ice time (24 minutes and 42 seconds per game) for contests in January 2010, Myers was named the NHL Rookie of the Month. He completed his first NHL season leading league rookie defensemen, as well as Sabres defensemen, playing every game that season with 11 goals and 37 assists adding up to a career high of 48 points and getting 1 point in the playoffs from 1 goal. In the off-season, Myers was awarded with the Calder Memorial Trophy on June 23, 2010 at the NHL Awards Ceremony in Las Vegas, beating out forward Matt Duchene of the Colorado Avalanche and goaltender Jimmy Howard of the Detroit Red Wings.

On November 15, 2010, Myers scored his fifth goal of the season in a 4–3 overtime win against the Vancouver Canucks. Myers got another overtime goal in a 3–2 win against the Florida Panthers on February 10, 2011. Myers finished the season missing only two games with 10 goals and 27 assists adding up to 37 points and getting six points in the playoffs from one goal and five assists. On September 15, 2011 the Sabres signed Myers to a seven-year, $38.5 million contract. On March 13, 2012, Myers was suspended for three games for boarding Montreal Canadiens forward Scott Gomez on March 12. On October 14, 2012, Myers signed with EC KAC of the Austrian Erste Bank Hockey League (EBEL) during the 2012–13 NHL lockout.

On April 12, 2013, the Sabres announced that Myers had broken a bone in his leg during the team's 5–1 loss to the Montreal Canadiens the night before and would miss the remainder of the season.

After Tyler Ennis went unsigned for the 2022-23 season, Myers became the last active NHL player to have played in a playoff game for the Sabres despite having not played for the Sabres since the 2014-15 season. This would stand until the Sabres qualified for the playoffs in the 2025-26 season. Myers consequently also became the Sabres' playoff scoring leader among active players until he was passed by Tage Thompson on May 10, 2026.

==== Winnipeg Jets ====
On February 11, 2015, Myers, Drew Stafford, Brendan Lemieux, Joel Armia and a conditional first-round pick in the 2015 NHL entry draft, were traded to the Winnipeg Jets in exchange for Evander Kane, Zach Bogosian and the rights to Jason Kasdorf.

Myers' 2015–16 season was ended early by hip and knee surgeries announced by the Jets on March 24, 2016.

During the 2016–17 season, Myers would play in 11 games before he suffered an undisclosed lower-body injury (unrelated to the hip and knee surgeries he had the previous offseason) in a 3–2 overtime loss to the Colorado Avalanche on November 11, 2016. Surgery was not initially expected to be required, however after being out of the lineup for three months, it was announced that Myers would in fact have surgery to repair the lower body injury, ending Myers second consecutive season due to surgery.

Myers would stay healthy for the duration of the 2017–18 season, playing in all 82 regular season games for the first time since his rookie season, and scoring six goals and 30 assists for 36 points while averaging 21:26 of ice time as the Jets finished second in the Central Division, and made the playoffs for the first time since 2014–15. The Jets ultimately made it to the Western Conference final, losing to the Vegas Golden Knights in five games.

==== Vancouver Canucks ====
On July 1, 2019, Myers was signed as a free agent to a five-year, $30 million contract with the Vancouver Canucks. Later, on December 7, Myers scored his first goal as a member of the Canucks in a 6–5 overtime win versus the visiting Buffalo Sabres, one of Myers' former teams.

On June 27, 2024, the Canucks re-signed Myers to a three-year, $9 million contract. He would subsequently play his 1,000th NHL game on October 19, becoming the 400th skater to achieve the milestone.

On January 20, 2025, Myers was handed a three-game suspension for cross-checking Evan Bouchard in a game against the Edmonton Oilers on January 18.

==== Dallas Stars ====
On March 4, 2026, Myers was traded by the Canucks to the Dallas Stars in exchange for a 2027 second-round pick in and a 2029 fourth-round pick. The Canucks retained 50% of his salary in the transaction.

On March 8, 2026, in their game against the Chicago Blackhawks, Myers became the first Texas-born player to play in a regular season game for the Dallas Stars.

== International play ==
Medal record

Men's ice hockey

Representing Canada

World Championships
Gold medal – first place	2023 Finland/Latvia	

World Junior Championships
Gold medal – first place	2009 Ottawa	

IIHF U18 Championships
Gold medal – first place	2008 Kazan	

Despite being born in Houston, Myers plays internationally for Canada, as he moved to Calgary when he was 10 years old and holds dual citizenship. Making the decision in his youth, he has credited moving to Canada as a large influence in his development as a hockey player, stating he would "be playing a different sport had I stayed in Texas," presumably basketball as many NHL and analysts from other sports leagues have speculated.

Myers was a part of the national team that earned gold at the 2008 World U18 Championships. He was later named to Canada junior team for the 2009 World Junior Championships along with Kelowna Rockets teammate Jamie Benn, and helped Canada to a record-tying fifth straight gold medal. On April 29, 2010, Myers was named to the Canada senior team roster for the 2010 World Championship. He was part of a young squad that finished without a medal.

== Personal life ==
Myers was born on February 1, 1990, to parents Tonja Stelly and Paul Myers III. When Myers was six years old his father took him to his first hockey game, watching the Houston Aeros of the International Hockey League (IHL). Myers quickly became interested in the game after watching it, and started to play soon after. In 2000, Paul moved to Calgary, with Tyler joining him; Tyler would later acquire Canadian citizenship.

His younger maternal half-brother, Quentin Grimes, is an American basketball player for the Los Angeles Lakers of the National Basketball Association (NBA). Grimes and Myers are the first set of brothers to play in the NHL and NBA.

Myers and his wife were married in 2014. The couple have two children together.

== Career statistics ==
=== Regular season and playoffs ===
			Regular season					Playoffs
Season	Team	League	GP	G	A	Pts	PIM	GP	G	A	Pts	PIM
2005–06	Notre Dame Hounds AAA	SMHL	34	4	6	10	78	—	—	—	—	—
2005–06	Kelowna Rockets	WHL	9	0	1	1	2	8	1	0	1	2
2006–07	Kelowna Rockets	WHL	59	2	13	15	78	—	—	—	—	—
2007–08	Kelowna Rockets	WHL	65	6	13	19	97	7	1	2	3	12
2008–09	Kelowna Rockets	WHL	58	9	33	42	105	22	5	15	20	29
2009–10	Buffalo Sabres	NHL	82	11	37	48	32	6	1	0	1	4
2010–11	Buffalo Sabres	NHL	80	10	27	37	40	7	1	5	6	16
2011–12	Buffalo Sabres	NHL	55	8	15	23	33	—	—	—	—	—
2012–13	EC KAC	EBEL	17	3	7	10	37	—	—	—	—	—
2012–13	Buffalo Sabres	NHL	39	3	5	8	32	—	—	—	—	—
2013–14	Buffalo Sabres	NHL	62	9	13	22	58	—	—	—	—	—
2014–15	Buffalo Sabres	NHL	47	4	9	13	61	—	—	—	—	—
2014–15	Winnipeg Jets	NHL	24	3	12	15	16	4	1	0	1	2
2015–16	Winnipeg Jets	NHL	73	9	18	27	72	—	—	—	—	—
2016–17	Winnipeg Jets	NHL	11	2	3	5	13	—	—	—	—	—
2017–18	Winnipeg Jets	NHL	82	6	30	36	48	16	4	3	7	8
2018–19	Winnipeg Jets	NHL	80	9	22	31	63	6	0	0	0	4
2019–20	Vancouver Canucks	NHL	68	6	15	21	49	10	0	0	0	24
2020–21	Vancouver Canucks	NHL	55	6	15	21	51	—	—	—	—	—
2021–22	Vancouver Canucks	NHL	82	1	17	18	66	—	—	—	—	—
2022–23	Vancouver Canucks	NHL	78	1	16	17	76	—	—	—	—	—
2023–24	Vancouver Canucks	NHL	77	5	24	29	77	12	0	1	1	6
2024–25	Vancouver Canucks	NHL	71	6	18	24	74	—	—	—	—	—
2025–26	Vancouver Canucks	NHL	57	1	7	8	40	—	—	—	—	—
2025–26	Dallas Stars	NHL	16	0	3	3	12	5	0	0	0	4
NHL totals			1,139	100	306	406	913	66	7	9	16	68

=== International ===
Year	Team	Event	Result	GP	G	A	Pts	PIM
2008	Canada	U18	1st place, gold medalist(s)	7	1	1	2	10
2009	Canada	WJC	1st place, gold medalist(s)	6	1	0	1	2
2010	Canada	WC	7th	7	0	2	2	4
2014	Canada	WC	5th	8	0	2	2	6
2023	Canada	WC	1st place, gold medalist(s)	10	1	0	1	10
Junior totals				13	2	1	3	12
Senior totals				25	1	4	5	20

== Awards and honors ==
Award	Year	Ref
WHL
WHL West Second All-Star Team	2009	
Playoff MVP	2009	
Ed Chynoweth Cup champion	2009	
Memorial Cup All-Star Team	2009	
NHL
Calder Memorial Trophy	2009–10	

== See also ==
- List of NHL players with 1,000 games played

Awards and achievements
Preceded by Dennis Persson	Buffalo Sabres first-round draft pick 2008	Succeeded by Tyler Ennis
Preceded by Steve Mason	Winner of the Calder Trophy; 2010	Succeeded by Jeff Skinner
