= List of Buffalo Sabres draft picks =

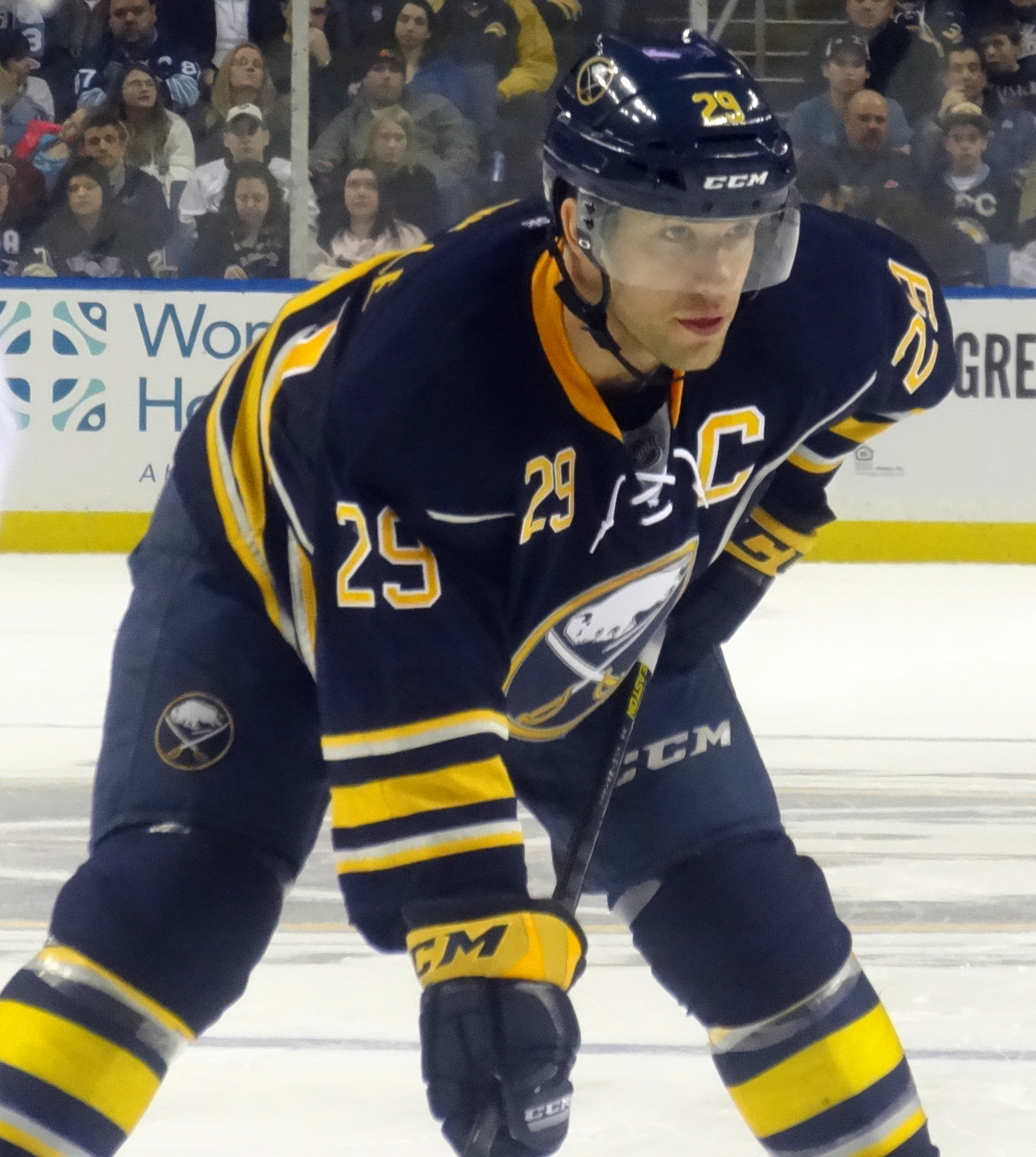
Jason Pominville, selected 55th overall in the 2001 NHL entry draft, is one of fourteen players drafted by the Buffalo Sabres to play over 1,000 games in the NHL.

The Buffalo Sabres are a professional ice hockey franchise located in Buffalo, New York. Founded on May 22, 1970, ahead of the 1970–71 season as an expansion team, they play in the Atlantic Division of the Eastern Conference in the National Hockey League (NHL). The NHL entry draft is held each off-season in June, allowing teams to select players who will have turned 18 years old by September 15 in the year the draft is held. The draft order is determined by the previous season's order of finish, with non-playoff teams drafting first, followed by the teams that made the playoffs, with the specific order determined by the number of points earned by each team. From 1995 to 2012, the winner of the draft lottery was allowed to move up a maximum of four positions in the entry draft. Since 2016, the NHL has held a weighted lottery for the 16 non-playoff teams, allowing the winner to move up to the first overall pick. The team with the fewest points has the best chance of winning the lottery, with each successive team given a lower chance of moving up in the draft. As of 2026, the Sabres have made 526 selections in 56 entry drafts.

The Sabres first participated in the 1970 NHL amateur draft, where they selected Gilbert Perreault at first overall for their first-ever selection. The Sabres have selected first overall in three other drafts with Pierre Turgeon in 1987, Rasmus Dahlin in 2018, and Owen Power in 2021. Perreault played his whole career with the Sabres and had his number retired in the franchise, while Turgeon played five years with the Sabres before being traded to the New York Islanders in exchange for Pat LaFontaine. Dahlin and Power currently play in the NHL for the Sabres. Three Sabres draft picks have been inducted into the Hockey Hall of Fame: Phil Housley, Perreault, and Turgeon. Fourteen players selected by the Sabres went on to play 1,000 games in the NHL: Dave Andreychuk who ranks 10th in all-time games played with 1,639, Brian Campbell, Keith Carney, Housley, Calle Johansson, Brad May, Tyler Myers, Sean O'Donnell, Perreault, Jason Pominville, Craig Ramsay, Mike Ramsey, Turgeon, and Thomas Vanek.

== Key ==
^{†} Played at least one regular-season game with the Sabres.
* Spent their entire NHL career with the Sabres.
^{S} NHL supplemental draft.

General terms
Term	Definition
Draft	The year that the player was selected
Round	The round of the draft in which the player was selected
Pick	The overall position in the draft at which the player was selected

Position abbreviations
Abbr.	Definition
G	Goaltender
D	Defense
LW	Left wing
C	Center
RW	Right wing
F	Forward

Abbreviations for statistical columns
Abbr.	Definition
Pos	Position
GP	Games played
G	Goals
A	Assists
Pts	Points
PIM	Penalties in minutes
W	Wins
L	Losses
T	Ties
OT	Overtime/shootout losses
GAA	Goals against average
—	Does not apply

== Draft picks ==
Statistics are complete as of the 2025–26 NHL season and show each player's career regular season totals in the NHL. Wins, losses, ties, overtime losses, and goals against average apply to goaltenders and are used only for players at that position.

List of all players drafted by the Buffalo Sabres and their career statistics
Draft	Round	Pick	Player	Nationality	Pos	GP	G	A	Pts	PIM	W	L	T	OT	GAA
1970	1	1	Gilbert Perreault*	Canada	C	1191	512	814	1326	500	—	—	—	—	—
1970	2	15	Butch Deadmarsh^{†}	Canada	LW	137	12	5	17	155	—	—	—	—	—
1970	3	29	Steve Cuddie	Canada	D	—	—	—	—	—	—	—	—	—	—
1970	4	43	Randy Wyrozub*	Canada	C	100	8	10	18	10	—	—	—	—	—
1970	5	57	Mike Morton	Canada	RW	—	—	—	—	—	—	—	—	—	—
1970	6	71	Mike Keeler	Canada	D	—	—	—	—	—	—	—	—	—	—
1970	7	84	Tim Regan	United States	G	—	—	—	—	—	—	—	—	—	—
1970	8	97	Doug Rombough^{†}	Canada	C	150	24	27	51	80	—	—	—	—	—
1970	9	107	Luc Nadeau	Canada	D	—	—	—	—	—	—	—	—	—	—
1971	1	5	Rick Martin^{†}	Canada	LW	685	384	317	701	477	—	—	—	—	—
1971	2	19	Craig Ramsay*	Canada	LW	1070	252	420	672	201	—	—	—	—	—
1971	3	33	Bill Hajt*	Canada	D	854	42	202	244	433	—	—	—	—	—
1971	4	47	Bob Richer*	Canada	C	3	0	0	0	0	—	—	—	—	—
1971	5	61	Steve Warr	Canada	D	—	—	—	—	—	—	—	—	—	—
1971	6	75	Pierre Duguay	Canada	RW	—	—	—	—	—	—	—	—	—	—
1972	1	5	Jim Schoenfeld^{†}	Canada	D	719	51	204	255	1132	—	—	—	—	—
1972	2	25	Larry Carriere^{†}	Canada	D	367	16	74	90	462	—	—	—	—	—
1972	3	37	Jim McMasters	Canada	D	—	—	—	—	—	—	—	—	—	—
1972	4	53	Rychard Campeau	Canada	D	—	—	—	—	—	—	—	—	—	—
1972	5	69	Gilles Gratton	Canada	G	47	0	0	0	15	13	18	9	—	4.03
1972	6	85	Peter McNab^{†}	United States	C	954	363	450	813	179	—	—	—	—	—
1973	1	12	Morris Titanic*	Canada	LW	19	0	0	0	0	—	—	—	—	—
1973	2	28	Jean Landry	Canada	D	—	—	—	—	—	—	—	—	—	—
1973	3	44	André Deschamps	Canada	LW	—	—	—	—	—	—	—	—	—	—
1973	4	60	Yvon Dupuis	Canada	RW	—	—	—	—	—	—	—	—	—	—
1973	5	76	Bob Smulders	Canada	RW	—	—	—	—	—	—	—	—	—	—
1973	6	92	Neil Korzack	Canada	LW	—	—	—	—	—	—	—	—	—	—
1973	7	108	Bob Young	United States	D	—	—	—	—	—	—	—	—	—	—
1973	8	124	Tim O'Connell	United States	D	—	—	—	—	—	—	—	—	—	—
1974	1	11	Lee Fogolin^{†}	United States	D	924	44	195	239	1318	—	—	—	—	—
1974	2	29	Danny Gare^{†}	Canada	RW	827	354	331	685	1285	—	—	—	—	—
1974	3	47	Michel Deziel	Canada	LW	—	—	—	—	—	—	—	—	—	—
1974	4	65	Paul McIntosh*	Canada	D	48	0	2	2	66	—	—	—	—	—
1974	5	83	Garry Lariviere	Canada	D	219	6	57	63	167	—	—	—	—	—
1974	6	101	Dave Given	United States	RW	—	—	—	—	—	—	—	—	—	—
1974	7	119	Bernard Noreau	Canada	RW	—	—	—	—	—	—	—	—	—	—
1974	8	136	Charles Constantin	Canada	LW	—	—	—	—	—	—	—	—	—	—
1974	9	153	Rick Jodzio	Canada	LW	70	2	8	10	71	—	—	—	—	—
1974	10	168	Derek Smith^{†}	Canada	LW	335	78	116	194	60	—	—	—	—	—
1974	11	183	Taro Tsujimoto (Note: The pick of the fictitious Tsujimoto is marked as an invalid claim. The pick stood valid for several weeks until it was revealed that the player was made up as a protest to how the draft was held. The Sabres still list the claim as valid as an inside joke.)	Japan	F	—	—	—	—	—	—	—	—	—	—
1974	12	196	Bob Geoffrion	Canada	LW	—	—	—	—	—	—	—	—	—	—
1975	1	17	Bob Sauve^{†}	Canada	G	420	0	14	14	57	182	154	53	—	3.49
1975	2	35	Ken Breitenbach*	Canada	D	68	1	13	14	49	—	—	—	—	—
1975	3	44	Terry Martin^{†}	Canada	F	479	104	101	205	202	—	—	—	—	—
1975	3	53	Gary McAdam^{†}	Canada	RW	534	96	132	228	243	—	—	—	—	—
1975	4	71	Greg Neeld	Canada	RW	—	—	—	—	—	—	—	—	—	—
1975	5	89	Don Edwards^{†}	Canada	G	459	0	14	14	42	208	155	72	—	3.32
1975	6	107	Jim Minor	Canada	LW	—	—	—	—	—	—	—	—	—	—
1975	7	125	Grant Rowe	Canada	D	—	—	—	—	—	—	—	—	—	—
1975	8	143	Alec Tidey^{†}	Canada	RW	9	0	0	0	8	—	—	—	—	—
1975	9	159	Andy Whitby	Canada	RW	—	—	—	—	—	—	—	—	—	—
1975	10	174	Len Moher	United States	G	—	—	—	—	—	—	—	—	—	—
1976	2	33	Joe Kowal*	Canada	LW	22	0	5	5	13	—	—	—	—	—
1976	4	69	Rocky Maze	Canada	LW	—	—	—	—	—	—	—	—	—	—
1976	5	87	Ron Roscoe	Canada	D	—	—	—	—	—	—	—	—	—	—
1976	6	105	Don Lemieux	Canada	D	—	—	—	—	—	—	—	—	—	—
1977	1	14	Ric Seiling^{†}	Canada	RW	738	179	208	387	573	—	—	—	—	—
1977	2	32	Ron Areshenkoff	Canada	C	4	0	0	0	0	—	—	—	—	—
1977	4	68	Bill Stewart^{†}	Canada	D	260	7	64	71	424	—	—	—	—	—
1977	5	86	Rich Sirois	Canada	G	—	—	—	—	—	—	—	—	—	—
1977	6	104	Wayne Ramsey*	Canada	D	2	0	0	0	0	—	—	—	—	—
1978	1	13	Larry Playfair^{†}	Canada	D	688	26	94	120	1814	—	—	—	—	—
1978	2	32	Tony McKegney^{†}	Canada	LW	912	320	319	639	517	—	—	—	—	—
1978	3	49	Rob McClanahan^{†}	United States	C	224	38	63	101	126	—	—	—	—	—
1978	4	66	Mike Gazdic	Canada	D	—	—	—	—	—	—	—	—	—	—
1978	5	82	Randy Ireland*	Canada	G	2	0	0	0	0	0	0	0	—	6.02
1978	6	99	Cam MacGregor	Canada	LW	—	—	—	—	—	—	—	—	—	—
1978	7	116	Dan Eastman	Canada	C	—	—	—	—	—	—	—	—	—	—
1978	8	133	Eric Strobel	United States	C	—	—	—	—	—	—	—	—	—	—
1978	9	150	Eugene O'Sullivan	Canada	C	—	—	—	—	—	—	—	—	—	—
1979	1	11	Mike Ramsey^{†}	United States	D	1070	79	266	345	1012	—	—	—	—	—
1979	2	32	Lindy Ruff^{†}	Canada	D	691	105	195	300	1264	—	—	—	—	—
1979	3	53	Mark Robinson	Canada	D	—	—	—	—	—	—	—	—	—	—
1979	3	55	Jacques Cloutier^{†}	Canada	G	255	0	7	7	51	82	102	24	—	3.64
1979	4	74	Gilles Hamel^{†}	Canada	LW	519	127	147	274	276	—	—	—	—	—
1979	5	95	Alan Haworth^{†}	Canada	C	524	189	211	400	425	—	—	—	—	—
1979	6	116	Rick Knickle	Canada	G	14	0	0	0	2	7	6	0	—	3.74
1980	1	20	Steve Patrick^{†}	Canada	F	250	40	68	108	242	—	—	—	—	—
1980	2	41	Mike Moller^{†}	Canada	RW	134	15	28	43	41	—	—	—	—	—
1980	3	56	Sean McKenna^{†}	Canada	RW	414	82	80	162	181	—	—	—	—	—
1980	3	62	Jay North	United States	C	—	—	—	—	—	—	—	—	—	—
1980	4	83	Jim Wiemer^{†}	Canada	LW	325	29	72	101	378	—	—	—	—	—
1980	5	104	Dirk Rueter	Canada	D	—	—	—	—	—	—	—	—	—	—
1980	6	123	Steve Lyons	United States	LW	—	—	—	—	—	—	—	—	—	—
1980	7	146	Jari Paavola	Finland	G	—	—	—	—	—	—	—	—	—	—
1980	8	167	Randy Cunneyworth^{†}	Canada	C	866	189	225	414	1280	—	—	—	—	—
1980	9	188	Dave Beckon	Canada	C	—	—	—	—	—	—	—	—	—	—
1980	10	209	John Bader	United States	LW	—	—	—	—	—	—	—	—	—	—
1981	1	17	Jiří Dudáček	Czech Republic	RW	—	—	—	—	—	—	—	—	—	—
1981	2	38	Hannu Virta*	Finland	D	245	25	101	126	66	—	—	—	—	—
1981	3	59	Jim Aldred	Canada	D	—	—	—	—	—	—	—	—	—	—
1981	3	60	Colin Chisholm	Canada	D	1	0	0	0	0	—	—	—	—	—
1981	4	80	Jeff Eatough*	Canada	RW	1	0	0	0	0	—	—	—	—	—
1981	4	83	Anders Wikberg	Sweden	LW	—	—	—	—	—	—	—	—	—	—
1981	5	101	Mauri Eivola	Finland	C	—	—	—	—	—	—	—	—	—	—
1981	6	122	Ali Butorac	Canada	D	—	—	—	—	—	—	—	—	—	—
1981	7	143	Heikki Leime	Finland	D	—	—	—	—	—	—	—	—	—	—
1981	8	164	Gates Orlando*	Canada	C	98	18	26	44	51	—	—	—	—	—
1981	9	185	Venci Sebek	Canada	D	—	—	—	—	—	—	—	—	—	—
1981	10	206	Warren Harper	Canada	RW	—	—	—	—	—	—	—	—	—	—
1982	1	6	Phil Housley^{†}	United States	D	1495	388	894	1232	822	—	—	—	—	—
1982	1	9	Paul Cyr^{†}	Canada	LW	470	101	140	241	623	—	—	—	—	—
1982	1	16	Dave Andreychuk^{†}	Canada	C	1639	640	698	1338	1125	—	—	—	—	—
1982	2	26	Mike Anderson	United States	C	—	—	—	—	—	—	—	—	—	—
1982	2	30	Jens Johansson	Sweden	D	—	—	—	—	—	—	—	—	—	—
1982	4	68	Timo Jutila*	Finland	D	10	1	5	6	13	—	—	—	—	—
1982	4	79	Jeff Hamilton	Canada	C	—	—	—	—	—	—	—	—	—	—
1982	5	100	Bob Logan^{†}	Canada	LW	42	10	5	15	0	—	—	—	—	—
1982	6	111	Jeff Parker^{†}	United States	D	141	16	19	35	163	—	—	—	—	—
1982	6	121	Jakob Gustavsson	Sweden	G	—	—	—	—	—	—	—	—	—	—
1982	7	142	Allen Bishop	Canada	D	—	—	—	—	—	—	—	—	—	—
1982	8	163	Claude Verret*	Canada	C	14	2	5	7	2	—	—	—	—	—
1982	9	184	Rob Norman	Canada	RW	—	—	—	—	—	—	—	—	—	—
1982	10	205	Mike Craig	Canada	G	—	—	—	—	—	—	—	—	—	—
1982	11	226	Jim Plankers	United States	D	—	—	—	—	—	—	—	—	—	—
1983	1	5	Tom Barrasso^{†}	United States	G	777	0	48	48	437	369	277	86	18	3.24
1983	1	10	Normand Lacombe^{†}	Canada	RW	319	53	62	115	196	—	—	—	—	—
1983	1	11	Adam Creighton^{†}	Canada	C	708	187	216	403	1077	—	—	—	—	—
1983	2	31	John Tucker^{†}	Canada	C	656	177	259	436	285	—	—	—	—	—
1983	2	34	Richard Hajdu*	Canada	LW	5	0	0	0	4	—	—	—	—	—
1983	4	74	Daren Puppa^{†}	Canada	G	429	0	18	18	48	179	161	54	0	3.04
1983	5	94	Jason Meyer	Canada	D	—	—	—	—	—	—	—	—	—	—
1983	6	114	Jim Hofford^{†}	Canada	D	18	0	0	0	47	—	—	—	—	—
1983	7	134	Christian Ruuttu^{†}	Finland	C	621	134	298	432	714	—	—	—	—	—
1983	8	154	Don McSween^{†}	United States	D	47	3	10	13	55	—	—	—	—	—
1983	9	174	Tim Hoover	Canada	D	—	—	—	—	—	—	—	—	—	—
1983	10	194	Mark Ferner^{†}	Canada	D	91	3	10	13	51	—	—	—	—	—
1983	11	214	Uwe Krupp^{†}	Germany	D	729	69	212	281	660	—	—	—	—	—
1983	12	234	Marc Hamelin	Canada	G	—	—	—	—	—	—	—	—	—	—
1983	12	235	Kermit Salfi	United States	LW	—	—	—	—	—	—	—	—	—	—
1984	1	18	Mikael Andersson^{†}	Sweden	LW	761	95	169	264	134	—	—	—	—	—
1984	2	39	Doug Trapp*	Canada	LW	2	0	0	0	0	—	—	—	—	—
1984	3	60	Ray Sheppard^{†}	Canada	RW	817	357	300	657	212	—	—	—	—	—
1984	4	81	Bob Halkidis^{†}	Canada	D	256	8	32	40	825	—	—	—	—	—
1984	5	102	Joey Rampton	Canada	LW	—	—	—	—	—	—	—	—	—	—
1984	6	123	James Gasseau	Canada	D	—	—	—	—	—	—	—	—	—	—
1984	7	144	Darcy Wakaluk^{†}	Canada	G	191	0	6	6	90	67	75	21	—	3.22
1984	8	165	Orwar Stambert	Sweden	D	—	—	—	—	—	—	—	—	—	—
1984	9	186	Eric Weinrich (Note: The pick of Weinrich is marked as an invalid claim, as he had not cleared the minimum age restriction for eligible draftees. He was selected in the second round the following year by the New Jersey Devils.)	United States	D	1157	70	318	388	825	—	—	—	—	—
1984	10	206	Brian McKinnon	Canada	C	—	—	—	—	—	—	—	—	—	—
1984	11	226	Grant Delcourt	Canada	RW	—	—	—	—	—	—	—	—	—	—
1984	12	247	Sean Baker	United States	LW	—	—	—	—	—	—	—	—	—	—
1985	1	14	Calle Johansson^{†}	Sweden	D	1109	119	416	535	519	—	—	—	—	—
1985	2	35	Benoît Hogue^{†}	Canada	LW	863	222	321	543	877	—	—	—	—	—
1985	3	56	Keith Gretzky	Canada	F	—	—	—	—	—	—	—	—	—	—
1985	4	77	Dave Moylan	Canada	D	—	—	—	—	—	—	—	—	—	—
1985	5	98	Ken Priestlay^{†}	Canada	C	168	27	34	61	63	—	—	—	—	—
1985	6	119	Joe Reekie^{†}	Canada	D	902	25	139	164	1326	—	—	—	—	—
1985	7	140	Petri Matikainen	Finland	D	—	—	—	—	—	—	—	—	—	—
1985	8	161	Trent Kaese*	Canada	RW	1	0	0	0	0	—	—	—	—	—
1985	9	182	Jiří Šejba*	Czech Republic	F	11	0	2	2	8	—	—	—	—	—
1985	10	203	Boyd Sutton	United States	C	—	—	—	—	—	—	—	—	—	—
1985	11	224	Guy Larose	Canada	C	70	10	9	19	63	—	—	—	—	—
1985	12	245	Ken Baumgartner	Canada	LW	696	13	41	54	2242	—	—	—	—	—
1986	1	5	Shawn Anderson^{†}	Canada	D	255	11	51	62	117	—	—	—	—	—
1986	2	26	Greg Brown^{†}	United States	D	94	4	14	18	86	—	—	—	—	—
1986	3	47	Bob Corkum^{†}	United States	C	720	97	103	200	281	—	—	—	—	—
1986	3	56	Kevin Kerr	Canada	RW	—	—	—	—	—	—	—	—	—	—
1986	4	68	Dave Baseggio	Canada	D	—	—	—	—	—	—	—	—	—	—
1986	5	89	Larry Rooney	United States	D	—	—	—	—	—	—	—	—	—	—
1986	6	110	Miguel Baldris	Canada	D	—	—	—	—	—	—	—	—	—	—
1986	7	131	Mike Hartman^{†}	United States	LW	397	43	35	78	1388	—	—	—	—	—
1986	8	152	Francois Guay*	Canada	C	1	0	0	0	0	—	—	—	—	—
1986	9	173	Sean Whitham	Canada	D	—	—	—	—	—	—	—	—	—	—
1986	10	194	Kenton Rein	Canada	C	—	—	—	—	—	—	—	—	—	—
1986	11	215	Troy Arndt	Canada	D	—	—	—	—	—	—	—	—	—	—
1986^{S}	1	4	Jeff Capello	Canada	LW	—	—	—	—	—	—	—	—	—	—
1986^{S}	2	8	John Cullen	Canada	C	621	187	363	550	898	—	—	—	—	—
1987	1	1	Pierre Turgeon^{†}	Canada	C	1294	515	812	1327	452	—	—	—	—	—
1987	2	22	Brad Miller^{†}	Canada	D	82	1	5	6	321	—	—	—	—	—
1987	3	53	Andrew MacVicar	Canada	LW	—	—	—	—	—	—	—	—	—	—
1987	4	84	John Bradley	United States	G	—	—	—	—	—	—	—	—	—	—
1987	5	85	Dave Pergola	United States	RW	—	—	—	—	—	—	—	—	—	—
1987	6	106	Chris Marshall	United States	LW	—	—	—	—	—	—	—	—	—	—
1987	7	127	Paul Flanagan	United States	D	—	—	—	—	—	—	—	—	—	—
1987	8	148	Sean Dooley	United States	D	—	—	—	—	—	—	—	—	—	—
1987	8	153	Tim Roberts	United States	D	—	—	—	—	—	—	—	—	—	—
1987	9	169	Grant Tkachuk	Canada	LW	—	—	—	—	—	—	—	—	—	—
1987	10	190	Ian Herbers	Canada	D	65	0	5	5	79	—	—	—	—	—
1987	11	211	David Littman^{†}	United States	G	3	0	0	0	0	0	2	0	—	5.95
1987	12	232	Al MacIsaac	Canada	D	—	—	—	—	—	—	—	—	—	—
1987^{S}	1	1	Dave Snuggerud^{†}	United States	RW	265	30	54	84	127	—	—	—	—	—
1987^{S}	2	6	Mike DeCarle	United States	RW	—	—	—	—	—	—	—	—	—	—
1988	1	13	Joel Savage*	Canada	RW	3	0	1	1	0	—	—	—	—	—
1988	3	55	Darcy Loewen^{†}	Canada	LW	135	4	8	12	211	—	—	—	—	—
1988	4	76	Keith Carney^{†}	United States	D	1018	45	183	228	904	—	—	—	—	—
1988	5	89	Alexander Mogilny^{†}	Russia	RW	990	473	559	1032	432	—	—	—	—	—
1988	5	97	Rob Ray^{†}	Canada	RW	900	41	50	91	3207	—	—	—	—	—
1988	6	106	David DiVita	United States	D	—	—	—	—	—	—	—	—	—	—
1988	6	118	Mike McLaughlin	United States	LW	—	—	—	—	—	—	—	—	—	—
1988	7	139	Mike Griffith	Canada	RW	—	—	—	—	—	—	—	—	—	—
1988	8	160	Don Ruoho	United States	LW	—	—	—	—	—	—	—	—	—	—
1988	9	181	Wade Flaherty	Canada	G	120	0	3	3	6	27	56	9	1	3.51
1988	11	223	Tom Nieman	United States	C	—	—	—	—	—	—	—	—	—	—
1988	12	244	Bobby Wallwork	United States	LW	—	—	—	—	—	—	—	—	—	—
1988^{S}	2	14	Clark Davies	Canada	D	—	—	—	—	—	—	—	—	—	—
1989	1	14	Kevin Haller^{†}	Canada	D	642	41	97	138	907	—	—	—	—	—
1989	3	56	Scott Thomas^{†}	United States	RW	63	6	4	10	34	—	—	—	—	—
1989	4	77	Doug MacDonald*	Canada	C	11	1	0	1	2	—	—	—	—	—
1989	5	98	Ken Sutton^{†}	Canada	D	388	23	80	103	338	—	—	—	—	—
1989	6	107	Bill Pye	United States	G	—	—	—	—	—	—	—	—	—	—
1989	6	119	Mike Barkley	Canada	C	—	—	—	—	—	—	—	—	—	—
1989	8	161	Derek Plante^{†}	United States	C	450	96	152	248	138	—	—	—	—	—
1989	9	183	Donald Audette^{†}	Canada	RW	735	260	24	509	584	—	—	—	—	—
1989	10	194	Mark Astley*	Canada	D	75	4	19	23	92	—	—	—	—	—
1989	10	203	John Nelson	Canada	RW	—	—	—	—	—	—	—	—	—	—
1989	11	224	Todd Henderson	Canada	G	—	—	—	—	—	—	—	—	—	—
1989	12	245	Mike Bavis	United States	F	—	—	—	—	—	—	—	—	—	—
1989^{S}	2	19	Ian Boyce	Canada	LW	—	—	—	—	—	—	—	—	—	—
1990	1	14	Brad May^{†}	Canada	LW	1041	127	161	288	2248	—	—	—	—	—
1990	4	82	Brian McCarthy	United States	C	—	—	—	—	—	—	—	—	—	—
1990	5	97	Richard Šmehlík^{†}	Czech Republic	D	644	49	146	195	415	—	—	—	—	—
1990	5	100	Todd Bojcun	Canada	G	—	—	—	—	—	—	—	—	—	—
1990	5	103	Brad Pascall	Canada	D	—	—	—	—	—	—	—	—	—	—
1990	7	142	Viktor Gordiyuk*	Russia	LW	26	3	8	11	0	—	—	—	—	—
1990	8	166	Milan Nedoma	Czech Republic	D	—	—	—	—	—	—	—	—	—	—
1990	9	187	Jason Winch	Canada	C	—	—	—	—	—	—	—	—	—	—
1990	10	208	Sylvain Naud	Canada	RW	—	—	—	—	—	—	—	—	—	—
1990	11	229	Ken Martin	United States	LW	—	—	—	—	—	—	—	—	—	—
1990	12	250	Brad Rubachuk	Canada	C	—	—	—	—	—	—	—	—	—	—
1990^{S}	2	24	Shane McFarlane	United States	C	—	—	—	—	—	—	—	—	—	—
1991	1	13	Philippe Boucher^{†}	Canada	D	748	94	206	300	702	—	—	—	—	—
1991	2	35	Jason Dawe^{†}	Canada	RW	366	86	90	176	162	—	—	—	—	—
1991	3	57	Jason Young	Canada	LW	—	—	—	—	—	—	—	—	—	—
1991	4	72	Peter Ambroziak*	Canada	F	12	0	1	1	0	—	—	—	—	—
1991	5	101	Steve Shields^{†}	Canada	G	246	0	2	2	78	80	104	39	13	2.67
1991	6	123	Sean O'Donnell	Canada	D	1224	31	198	229	1809	—	—	—	—	—
1991	6	124	Brian Holzinger^{†}	United States	C	547	93	145	238	339	—	—	—	—	—
1991	7	145	Chris Snell	Canada	D	34	2	7	9	24	—	—	—	—	—
1991	8	162	Jiri Kuntos	Czech Republic	D	—	—	—	—	—	—	—	—	—	—
1991	9	189	Tony Iob	Canada	LW	—	—	—	—	—	—	—	—	—	—
1991	10	211	Spencer Meany	Canada	F	—	—	—	—	—	—	—	—	—	—
1991	11	233	Mikhail Volkov	Russia	RW	—	—	—	—	—	—	—	—	—	—
1991	12	255	Michael Smith	Canada	D	—	—	—	—	—	—	—	—	—	—
1991^{S}	2	19	Jamie Steer	Canada	F	—	—	—	—	—	—	—	—	—	—
1992	1	11	David Cooper	Canada	D	30	3	7	10	24	—	—	—	—	—
1992	2	35	Jozef Čierny	Czech Republic	LW	1	0	0	0	0	—	—	—	—	—
1992	3	59	Ondřej Steiner	Czech Republic	C	—	—	—	—	—	—	—	—	—	—
1992	4	80	Dean Melanson^{†}	Canada	D	9	0	0	0	8	—	—	—	—	—
1992	4	83	Matthew Barnaby^{†}	Canada	RW	834	113	187	300	2562	—	—	—	—	—
1992	5	107	Markus Ketterer	Finland	G	—	—	—	—	—	—	—	—	—	—
1992	5	108	Yuri Khmylev^{†}	Russia	LW	263	64	88	152	133	—	—	—	—	—
1992	6	131	Paul Rushforth	Canada	C	—	—	—	—	—	—	—	—	—	—
1992	8	179	Dean Tiltgen	Canada	C	—	—	—	—	—	—	—	—	—	—
1992	9	203	Todd Simon*	Canada	C	15	0	1	1	0	—	—	—	—	—
1992	10	227	Rick Kowalsky	Canada	RW	—	—	—	—	—	—	—	—	—	—
1992	11	251	Chris Clancy	Canada	LW	—	—	—	—	—	—	—	—	—	—
1993	2	38	Denis Tsygurov^{†}	Russia	D	51	1	5	6	45	—	—	—	—	—
1993	3	64	Ethan Philpott	United States	RW	—	—	—	—	—	—	—	—	—	—
1993	5	116	Richard Safarik	Czech Republic	G	—	—	—	—	—	—	—	—	—	—
1993	6	142	Kevin Pozzo	Canada	D	—	—	—	—	—	—	—	—	—	—
1993	7	168	Sergei Petrenko*	USSR	LW	14	0	4	4	0	—	—	—	—	—
1993	8	194	Mike Barrie	Canada	C	—	—	—	—	—	—	—	—	—	—
1993	9	220	Barrie Moore^{†}	Canada	LW	39	2	6	8	18	—	—	—	—	—
1993	10	246	Chris Davis	Canada	G	—	—	—	—	—	—	—	—	—	—
1993	11	272	Scott Nichol^{†}	Canada	C	662	56	71	127	916	—	—	—	—	—
1994	1	17	Wayne Primeau^{†}	Canada	C	774	69	125	194	789	—	—	—	—	—
1994	2	43	Curtis Brown^{†}	Canada	LW	736	129	171	300	398	—	—	—	—	—
1994	3	69	Rumun Ndur^{†}	Nigeria	D	69	2	3	5	137	—	—	—	—	—
1994	5	121	Sergei Klimentiev	Ukraine	D	—	—	—	—	—	—	—	—	—	—
1994	6	147	Cal Benazic	Canada	D	—	—	—	—	—	—	—	—	—	—
1994	7	168	Steve Plouffe	Canada	G	—	—	—	—	—	—	—	—	—	—
1994	7	173	Shane Hnidy	Canada	D	550	16	55	71	633	—	—	—	—	—
1994	7	176	Steve Webb	Canada	RW	321	5	13	18	532	—	—	—	—	—
1994	8	199	Bob Westerby	Canada	LW	—	—	—	—	—	—	—	—	—	—
1994	9	225	Craig Millar	Canada	D	114	8	14	22	73	—	—	—	—	—
1994	10	251	Mark Polak	Canada	C	—	—	—	—	—	—	—	—	—	—
1994	11	277	Shayne Wright	Canada	D	—	—	—	—	—	—	—	—	—	—
1995	1	14	Jay McKee^{†}	Canada	D	802	21	104	125	622	—	—	—	—	—
1995	1	16	Martin Biron^{†}	Canada	G	508	0	6	6	79	230	191	25	27	2.61
1995	2	42	Mark Dutiaume	Canada	LW	—	—	—	—	—	—	—	—	—	—
1995	3	68	Mathieu Sunderland	Canada	RW	—	—	—	—	—	—	—	—	—	—
1995	4	94	Matt Davidson	Canada	RW	56	5	7	12	28	—	—	—	—	—
1995	5	111	Marian Menhart	Czech Republic	D	—	—	—	—	—	—	—	—	—	—
1995	5	119	Kevin Popp	Canada	D	—	—	—	—	—	—	—	—	—	—
1995	5	123	Daniel Bienvenue	Canada	LW	—	—	—	—	—	—	—	—	—	—
1995	7	172	Brian Scott	Canada	F	—	—	—	—	—	—	—	—	—	—
1995	8	198	Mike Zanutto	Canada	C	—	—	—	—	—	—	—	—	—	—
1995	9	224	Rob Skrlac	Canada	F	8	1	0	1	22	—	—	—	—	—
1996	1	7	Erik Rasmussen^{†}	United States	C	545	52	76	128	305	—	—	—	—	—
1996	2	27	Cory Sarich^{†}	Canada	D	957	21	136	157	1085	—	—	—	—	—
1996	2	33	Darren Van Oene	Canada	LW	—	—	—	—	—	—	—	—	—	—
1996	3	53	Eric Naud	Canada	LW	—	—	—	—	—	—	—	—	—	—
1996	3	54	François Méthot	Canada	LW	—	—	—	—	—	—	—	—	—	—
1996	4	87	Kurt Walsh	Canada	F	—	—	—	—	—	—	—	—	—	—
1996	4	106	Mike Martone	Canada	D	—	—	—	—	—	—	—	—	—	—
1996	5	115	Alexei Tezikov	Russia	D	30	1	1	2	2	—	—	—	—	—
1996	6	142	Ryan Davis	Canada	RW	—	—	—	—	—	—	—	—	—	—
1996	6	161	Darren Mortier	Canada	C	—	—	—	—	—	—	—	—	—	—
1996	9	222	Scott Buhler	Canada	G	—	—	—	—	—	—	—	—	—	—
1997	1	21	Mika Noronen^{†}	Finland	G	71	1	0	1	4	23	32	6	0	2.68
1997	2	48	Henrik Tallinder^{†}	Sweden	RW	678	28	114	142	378	—	—	—	—	—
1997	3	69	Maxim Afinogenov^{†}	Russia	RW	651	158	237	395	486	—	—	—	—	—
1997	3	75	Jeff Martin	Canada	F	—	—	—	—	—	—	—	—	—	—
1997	4	101	Luc Theoret	Canada	D	—	—	—	—	—	—	—	—	—	—
1997	5	128	Torrey DiRoberto	Canada	LW	—	—	—	—	—	—	—	—	—	—
1997	6	156	Brian Campbell^{†}	Canada	D	1082	87	417	504	277	—	—	—	—	—
1997	7	184	Jeremy Adduono	Canada	LW	—	—	—	—	—	—	—	—	—	—
1997	8	212	Kamil Piroš	Czech Republic	C	28	4	4	8	10	—	—	—	—	—
1997	9	238	Dylan Kemp	Canada	D	—	—	—	—	—	—	—	—	—	—
1998	1	18	Dmitri Kalinin^{†}	Russia	D	539	36	126	162	321	—	—	—	—	—
1998	2	34	Andrew Peters^{†}	Canada	LW	229	4	3	7	650	—	—	—	—	—
1998	2	47	Norm Milley^{†}	Canada	RW	29	2	4	6	12	—	—	—	—	—
1998	2	50	Jaroslav Kristek*	Czech Republic	RW	6	0	0	0	4	—	—	—	—	—
1998	3	77	Mike Pandolfo	United States	LW	3	0	0	0	0	—	—	—	—	—
1998	5	137	Aaron Goldade	Canada	LW	—	—	—	—	—	—	—	—	—	—
1998	6	164	Aleš Kotalík^{†}	Czech Republic	RW	542	136	148	284	348	—	—	—	—	—
1998	7	191	Brad Moran	Canada	C	8	1	2	3	4	—	—	—	—	—
1998	8	218	David Moravec*	Czech Republic	RW	1	0	0	0	0	—	—	—	—	—
1998	9	249	Edo Terglav	Slovenia	RW	—	—	—	—	—	—	—	—	—	—
1999	1	20	Barrett Heisten	United States	LW	10	0	0	0	0	—	—	—	—	—
1999	2	35	Milan Bartovič^{†}	Slovakia	F	50	3	14	17	26	—	—	—	—	—
1999	2	55	Doug Janik^{†}	United States	D	190	3	16	19	154	—	—	—	—	—
1999	2	64	Michael Zigomanis	Canada	C	197	21	19	40	89	—	—	—	—	—
1999	3	73	Tim Preston	Canada	LW	—	—	—	—	—	—	—	—	—	—
1999	4	117	Karel Mosovsky	Czech Republic	F	—	—	—	—	—	—	—	—	—	—
1999	5	138	Ryan Miller^{†}	United States	G	796	0	12	12	48	391	289	1	88	2.64
1999	5	146	Matt Kinch	Canada	D	—	—	—	—	—	—	—	—	—	—
1999	6	178	Seneque Hyacinthe Jr.	Canada	RW	—	—	—	—	—	—	—	—	—	—
1999	7	206	Bret DeCecco	Canada	RW	—	—	—	—	—	—	—	—	—	—
1999	8	235	Brad Self	Canada	C	—	—	—	—	—	—	—	—	—	—
1999	9	263	Craig Brunel	Canada	RW	—	—	—	—	—	—	—	—	—	—
2000	1	15	Artyom Kryukov	Russia	F	—	—	—	—	—	—	—	—	—	—
2000	2	48	Gerard Dicaire	Canada	D	—	—	—	—	—	—	—	—	—	—
2000	4	111	Ghyslain Rousseau	Canada	G	—	—	—	—	—	—	—	—	—	—
2000	5	149	Denis Denisov	Russia	D	—	—	—	—	—	—	—	—	—	—
2000	7	213	Vasily Bizyayev	Russia	C	—	—	—	—	—	—	—	—	—	—
2000	7	220	Paul Gaustad^{†}	United States	C	727	89	142	231	778	—	—	—	—	—
2000	8	258	Sean McMorrow*	Canada	RW	1	0	0	0	0	—	—	—	—	—
2000	9	277	Ryan Courtney	Canada	C	—	—	—	—	—	—	—	—	—	—
2001	1	22	Jiří Novotný^{†}	Czech Republic	C	189	20	31	51	66	—	—	—	—	—
2001	2	32	Derek Roy^{†}	Canada	C	738	189	335	524	391	—	—	—	—	—
2001	2	50	Chris Thorburn^{†}	Canada	C	801	53	81	134	968	—	—	—	—	—
2001	2	55	Jason Pominville^{†}	Canada	RW	1060	293	434	727	199	—	—	—	—	—
2001	5	155	Michal Vondrka	Czech Republic	F	—	—	—	—	—	—	—	—	—	—
2001	8	234	Calle Aslund	Sweden	D	—	—	—	—	—	—	—	—	—	—
2001	8	247	Marek Dubec	Czech Republic	F	—	—	—	—	—	—	—	—	—	—
2001	9	279	Ryan Jorde	Canada	D	—	—	—	—	—	—	—	—	—	—
2002	1	11	Keith Ballard	United States	D	604	38	137	175	612	—	—	—	—	—
2002	1	20	Daniel Paille^{†}	Canada	LW	582	85	87	172	135	—	—	—	—	—
2002	3	76	Michael Tessier	Canada	LW	—	—	—	—	—	—	—	—	—	—
2002	3	82	John Adams	United States	D	—	—	—	—	—	—	—	—	—	—
2002	4	108	Jakub Hulva	Czech Republic	RW	—	—	—	—	—	—	—	—	—	—
2002	4	121	Marty Magers	United States	G	—	—	—	—	—	—	—	—	—	—
2002	6	178	Maxim Schevjev	Russia	C	—	—	—	—	—	—	—	—	—	—
2002	7	208	Radoslav Hecl*	Czech Republic	D	14	0	0	0	2	—	—	—	—	—
2002	8	241	Dennis Wideman	Canada	D	815	99	288	387	503	—	—	—	—	—
2002	9	271	Martin Cizek	Czech Republic	D	—	—	—	—	—	—	—	—	—	—
2003	1	5	Thomas Vanek^{†}	Austria	F	1029	373	416	789	547	—	—	—	—	—
2003	2	65	Branislav Fábry	Czech Republic	RW	—	—	—	—	—	—	—	—	—	—
2003	3	74	Clarke MacArthur^{†}	Canada	LW	552	133	171	304	343	—	—	—	—	—
2003	4	106	Jan Hejda	Czech Republic	D	627	25	110	135	317	—	—	—	—	—
2003	4	114	Denis Ezhov	Russia	D	—	—	—	—	—	—	—	—	—	—
2003	5	150	Thomas Morrow	United States	D	—	—	—	—	—	—	—	—	—	—
2003	6	172	Pavel Voroshnin	Russia	D	—	—	—	—	—	—	—	—	—	—
2003	7	202	Nathan Paetsch^{†}	Canada	D	167	7	35	42	114	—	—	—	—	—
2003	8	235	Jeff Weber	Canada	G	—	—	—	—	—	—	—	—	—	—
2003	9	266	Louis-Philippe Martin	Canada	RW	—	—	—	—	—	—	—	—	—	—
2004	1	13	Drew Stafford^{†}	United States	RW	841	196	232	428	415	—	—	—	—	—
2004	2	43	Michael Funk*	Canada	RW	9	0	2	2	0	—	—	—	—	—
2004	3	72	Andrej Sekera^{†}	Slovakia	D	842	51	202	253	212	—	—	—	—	—
2004	5	145	Michal Valent	Slovakia	G	—	—	—	—	—	—	—	—	—	—
2004	6	176	Patrick Kaleta*	United States	RW	348	27	27	54	542	—	—	—	—	—
2004	7	207	Mark Mancari^{†}	Canada	RW	42	3	10	13	22	—	—	—	—	—
2004	8	241	Mike Card*	Canada	D	4	0	0	0	0	—	—	—	—	—
2004	9	273	Dylan Hunter	Canada	LW	—	—	—	—	—	—	—	—	—	—
2005	1	13	Marek Zagrapan	Slovakia	C	—	—	—	—	—	—	—	—	—	—
2005	2	48	Philip Gogulla	Germany	F	—	—	—	—	—	—	—	—	—	—
2005	3	87	Marc-André Gragnani^{†}	Canada	D	78	3	15	18	36	—	—	—	—	—
2005	4	96	Chris Butler^{†}	United States	D	407	14	72	86	187	—	—	—	—	—
2005	5	142	Nathan Gerbe^{†}	United States	C	435	63	88	151	196	—	—	—	—	—
2005	6	182	Adam Dennis	Canada	G	—	—	—	—	—	—	—	—	—	—
2005	6	191	Vyacheslav Buravchikov	Russia	D	—	—	—	—	—	—	—	—	—	—
2005	7	208	Matt Generous	United States	D	—	—	—	—	—	—	—	—	—	—
2005	7	227	Andrew Orpik	United States	D	—	—	—	—	—	—	—	—	—	—
2006	1	24	Dennis Persson	Sweden	D	—	—	—	—	—	—	—	—	—	—
2006	2	46	Jhonas Enroth^{†}	Sweden	G	153	0	0	0	2	50	69	—	16	2.84
2006	2	57	Mike Weber^{†}	United States	D	351	9	44	53	437	—	—	—	—	—
2006	4	117	Felix Schütz	Germany	C	—	—	—	—	—	—	—	—	—	—
2006	5	147	Alex Biega	Canada	D	243	4	38	42	122	—	—	—	—	—
2006	7	207	Benjamin Breault	Canada	C	—	—	—	—	—	—	—	—	—	—
2007	2	31	T. J. Brennan^{†}	United States	D	53	5	8	13	29	—	—	—	—	—
2007	2	59	Drew Schiestel	Canada	D	—	—	—	—	—	—	—	—	—	—
2007	3	89	Corey Tropp^{†}	United States	RW	149	6	21	27	133	—	—	—	—	—
2007	5	139	Bradley Eidsness	Canada	G	—	—	—	—	—	—	—	—	—	—
2007	5	147	Jean-Simon Allard	Canada	C	—	—	—	—	—	—	—	—	—	—
2007	6	179	Paul Byron^{†}	Canada	C	521	98	110	208	139	—	—	—	—	—
2007	7	187	Nick Eno	United States	G	—	—	—	—	—	—	—	—	—	—
2007	7	209	Drew Mackenzie	United States	D	—	—	—	—	—	—	—	—	—	—
2008	1	12	Tyler Myers^{†}	Canada	D	1139	100	306	406	913	—	—	—	—	—
2008	1	26	Tyler Ennis^{†}	Canada	LW	700	144	202	346	224	—	—	—	—	—
2008	2	44	Luke Adam^{†}	Canada	C	90	15	11	26	36	—	—	—	—	—
2008	3	81	Corey Fienhage	United States	D	—	—	—	—	—	—	—	—	—	—
2008	4	101	Justin Jokinen	United States	RW	—	—	—	—	—	—	—	—	—	—
2008	4	104	Jordon Southorn	Canada	D	—	—	—	—	—	—	—	—	—	—
2008	5	134	Jacob Lagacé	Canada	LW	—	—	—	—	—	—	—	—	—	—
2008	6	164	Nick Crawford	Canada	D	—	—	—	—	—	—	—	—	—	—
2009	1	13	Zack Kassian^{†}	Canada	RW	661	92	111	203	913	—	—	—	—	—
2009	3	66	Brayden McNabb^{†}	Canada	D	885	38	153	191	567	—	—	—	—	—
2009	4	104	Marcus Foligno^{†}	Canada	LW	931	148	188	336	950	—	—	—	—	—
2009	5	134	Mark Adams	United States	D	—	—	—	—	—	—	—	—	—	—
2009	6	164	Connor Knapp*	United States	G	2	0	1	1	0	0	0	—	1	3.14
2009	7	194	Maxime Legault	Canada	RW	—	—	—	—	—	—	—	—	—	—
2010	1	23	Mark Pysyk^{†}	Canada	D	521	28	76	104	162	—	—	—	—	—
2010	3	68	Jerome Gauthier-Leduc	Canada	D	—	—	—	—	—	—	—	—	—	—
2010	3	75	Kevin Sundher	Canada	C	—	—	—	—	—	—	—	—	—	—
2010	3	83	Matt MacKenzie	Canada	D	—	—	—	—	—	—	—	—	—	—
2010	4	98	Steven Shipley	Canada	C	—	—	—	—	—	—	—	—	—	—
2010	5	143	Greg Sutch	Canada	RW	—	—	—	—	—	—	—	—	—	—
2010	6	173	Cedrick Henley	Canada	LW	—	—	—	—	—	—	—	—	—	—
2010	7	203	Christian Isackson	United States	RW	—	—	—	—	—	—	—	—	—	—
2010	7	208	Riley Boychuk	Canada	LW	—	—	—	—	—	—	—	—	—	—
2011	1	16	Joel Armia^{†}	Finland	RW	653	116	116	232	222	—	—	—	—	—
2011	3	77	Daniel Catenacci^{†}	Canada	C	12	0	0	0	0	—	—	—	—	—
2011	4	107	Colin Jacobs	United States	C	—	—	—	—	—	—	—	—	—	—
2011	5	137	Alex Lepkowski	United States	D	—	—	—	—	—	—	—	—	—	—
2011	6	167	Nathan Lieuwen*	Canada	G	7	0	0	0	0	1	4	—	0	2.97
2011	7	197	Brad Navin	United States	C	—	—	—	—	—	—	—	—	—	—
2012	1	12	Mikhail Grigorenko^{†}	Russia	C	249	26	50	76	36	—	—	—	—	—
2012	1	14	Zemgus Girgensons^{†}	Latvia	C	844	100	114	214	270	—	—	—	—	—
2012	2	44	Jake McCabe^{†}	United States	D	723	40	160	200	452	—	—	—	—	—
2012	3	73	Justin Kea	Canada	C	—	—	—	—	—	—	—	—	—	—
2012	5	133	Logan Nelson	United States	C	—	—	—	—	—	—	—	—	—	—
2012	6	163	Linus Ullmark^{†}	Sweden	G	340	1	6	7	14	191	99	—	34	2.57
2012	7	193	Brady Austin*	Canada	D	5	0	0	0	4	—	—	—	—	—
2012	7	204	Judd Peterson	United States	C	—	—	—	—	—	—	—	—	—	—
2013	1	8	Rasmus Ristolainen^{†}	Finland	D	820	57	261	318	399	—	—	—	—	—
2013	1	16	Nikita Zadorov^{†}	Russia	D	804	53	137	190	998	—	—	—	—	—
2013	2	35	J. T. Compher	United States	C	658	129	173	302	235	—	—	—	—	—
2013	2	38	Connor Hurley	United States	C	—	—	—	—	—	—	—	—	—	—
2013	2	52	Justin Bailey^{†}	United States	RW	141	10	13	23	24	—	—	—	—	—
2013	3	69	Nicholas Baptiste*	Canada	RW	47	7	3	10	20	—	—	—	—	—
2013	5	129	Cal Petersen	United States	G	106	0	1	1	2	46	44	—	10	2.96
2013	5	130	Gustav Possler	Sweden	RW	—	—	—	—	—	—	—	—	—	—
2013	5	143	Anthony Florentino	United States	D	—	—	—	—	—	—	—	—	—	—
2013	6	159	Sean Malone^{†}	United States	C	2	0	1	1	2	—	—	—	—	—
2013	7	189	Eric Locke	United States	C	—	—	—	—	—	—	—	—	—	—
2014	1	2	Sam Reinhart^{†}	Canada	C	839	323	357	680	183	—	—	—	—	—
2014	2	31	Brendan Lemieux	Canada	LW	307	36	38	74	548	—	—	—	—	—
2014	2	44	Eric Cornel	Canada	C	—	—	—	—	—	—	—	—	—	—
2014	2	49	Václav Karabáček	Czech Republic	RW	—	—	—	—	—	—	—	—	—	—
2014	3	61	Jonas Johansson^{†}	Sweden	G	105	0	0	0	0	43	36	—	14	3.30
2014	3	74	Brycen Martin	Canada	D	—	—	—	—	—	—	—	—	—	—
2014	5	121	Max Willman	United States	C	68	7	3	10	22	—	—	—	—	—
2014	6	151	Christopher Brown	United States	C	—	—	—	—	—	—	—	—	—	—
2014	7	181	Victor Olofsson^{†}	Sweden	RW	448	118	124	242	50	—	—	—	—	—
2015	1	2	Jack Eichel^{†}	United States	C	690	266	432	698	211	—	—	—	—	—
2015	2	51	Brendan Guhle^{†}	Canada	D	65	4	10	14	24	—	—	—	—	—
2015	4	92	Will Borgen^{†}	United States	D	373	18	65	83	227	—	—	—	—	—
2015	5	122	Devante Stephens	Canada	D	—	—	—	—	—	—	—	—	—	—
2015	6	152	Giorgio Estephan	Canada	C	—	—	—	—	—	—	—	—	—	—
2015	7	182	Ivan Chukarov	United States	D	—	—	—	—	—	—	—	—	—	—
2016	1	8	Alexander Nylander^{†}	Sweden	LW	126	25	24	49	30	—	—	—	—	—
2016	2	33	Rasmus Asplund^{†}	Sweden	C	189	18	31	49	22	—	—	—	—	—
2016	3	69	Cliff Pu	Canada	C	—	—	—	—	—	—	—	—	—	—
2016	3	86	Casey Fitzgerald^{†}	United States	D	63	0	9	9	40	—	—	—	—	—
2016	4	99	Brett Murray*	Canada	LW	26	2	4	6	25	—	—	—	—	—
2016	5	129	Philip Nyberg	Sweden	D	—	—	—	—	—	—	—	—	—	—
2016	5	130	Vojtech Budik	Czech Republic	D	—	—	—	—	—	—	—	—	—	—
2016	6	159	Brandon Hagel	Canada	LW	446	161	210	371	291	—	—	—	—	—
2016	7	189	Austin Osmanski	United States	D	—	—	—	—	—	—	—	—	—	—
2016	7	190	Vasily Glotov	Russia	C	—	—	—	—	—	—	—	—	—	—
2017	1	8	Casey Mittelstadt^{†}	United States	C	509	96	182	278	118	—	—	—	—	—
2017	2	37	Marcus Davidsson	Sweden	C	—	—	—	—	—	—	—	—	—	—
2017	2	54	Ukko-Pekka Luukkonen*	Finland	G	190	0	4	4	16	93	74	—	18	2.96
2017	3	89	Oskari Laaksonen	Finland	D	—	—	—	—	—	—	—	—	—	—
2017	4	99	Jacob Bryson^{†}	Canada	D	304	6	45	51	60	—	—	—	—	—
2017	7	192	Linus Weissbach	Sweden	LW	—	—	—	—	—	—	—	—	—	—
2018	1	1	Rasmus Dahlin*	Sweden	D	586	102	332	434	454	—	—	—	—	—
2018	2	32	Mattias Samuelsson*	United States	D	290	20	64	84	116	—	—	—	—	—
2018	4	94	Matej Pekar	Czech Republic	C	—	—	—	—	—	—	—	—	—	—
2018	4	117	Linus Lindstrom Cronholm	Sweden	D	—	—	—	—	—	—	—	—	—	—
2018	5	125	Miska Kukkonen	Finland	D	—	—	—	—	—	—	—	—	—	—
2018	7	187	William Worge Kreü	Sweden	D	—	—	—	—	—	—	—	—	—	—
2019	1	7	Dylan Cozens^{†}	Canada	C	444	110	162	272	281	—	—	—	—	—
2019	1	31	Ryan Johnson*	United States	D	47	0	7	7	18	—	—	—	—	—
2019	3	67	Erik Portillo	Sweden	G	—	—	—	—	—	—	—	—	—	—
2019	4	102	Aaron Huglen	United States	RW	—	—	—	—	—	—	—	—	—	—
2019	5	143	Filip Cederqvist	Sweden	LW	—	—	—	—	—	—	—	—	—	—
2019	6	160	Lukáš Rousek*	Czech Republic	RW	17	1	3	4	0	—	—	—	—	—
2020	1	8	Jack Quinn*	Canada	RW	260	59	89	148	59	—	—	—	—	—
2020	2	34	JJ Peterka^{†}	Germany	C	320	92	105	197	116	—	—	—	—	—
2020	5	131	Matteo Constantini	Canada	C	—	—	—	—	—	—	—	—	—	—
2020	7	193	Albert Lyckåsen	Sweden	D	—	—	—	—	—	—	—	—	—	—
2020	7	216	Jakub Konečný	Czech Republic	C	—	—	—	—	—	—	—	—	—	—
2021	1	1	Owen Power*	Canada	D	323	27	113	140	86	—	—	—	—	—
2021	1	14	Isak Rosén^{†}	Sweden	RW	52	6	5	11	0	—	—	—	—	—
2021	2	33	Prokhor Poltapov	Russia	LW	—	—	—	—	—	—	—	—	—	—
2021	2	53	Aleksandr Kisakov	Russia	LW	—	—	—	—	—	—	—	—	—	—
2021	3	88	Stiven Sardarian	Russia	RW	—	—	—	—	—	—	—	—	—	—
2021	3	95	Josh Bloom	Canada	LW	—	—	—	—	—	—	—	—	—	—
2021	4	97	Olivier Nadeau	Canada	RW	—	—	—	—	—	—	—	—	—	—
2021	5	159	Viljami Marjala	Finland	LW	—	—	—	—	—	—	—	—	—	—
2021	6	161	William von Barnekow	Sweden	C	—	—	—	—	—	—	—	—	—	—
2021	6	188	Nikita Novikov	Russia	D	—	—	—	—	—	—	—	—	—	—
2021	7	193	Tyson Kozak*	Canada	C	67	5	6	11	4	—	—	—	—	—
2022	1	9	Matthew Savoie^{†}	Canada	C	87	18	20	38	24	—	—	—	—	—
2022	1	16	Noah Östlund*	Sweden	C	68	11	16	27	16	—	—	—	—	—
2022	1	28	Jiří Kulich*	Czech Republic	C	75	18	11	29	22	—	—	—	—	—
2022	2	41	Topias Leinonen	Finland	G	—	—	—	—	—	—	—	—	—	—
2022	3	74	Viktor Neuchev	Russia	LW	—	—	—	—	—	—	—	—	—	—
2022	4	106	Mats Lindgren	Canada	D	—	—	—	—	—	—	—	—	—	—
2022	5	134	Vsevolod Komarov	Russia	D	—	—	—	—	—	—	—	—	—	—
2022	6	170	Jake Richard	United States	RW	—	—	—	—	—	—	—	—	—	—
2022	6	187	Gustav Karlsson	Sweden	C	—	—	—	—	—	—	—	—	—	—
2022	7	202	Joel Ratkovic Berndtsson	Sweden	RW	—	—	—	—	—	—	—	—	—	—
2022	7	211	Linus Sjodin	Sweden	C	—	—	—	—	—	—	—	—	—	—
2023	1	13	Zach Benson*	Canada	LW	211	34	67	101	138	—	—	—	—	—
2023	2	39	Anton Wahlberg	Sweden	C	—	—	—	—	—	—	—	—	—	—
2023	2	45	Maxim Strbak	Slovakia	D	—	—	—	—	—	—	—	—	—	—
2023	3	86	Gavin McCarthy	United States	D	—	—	—	—	—	—	—	—	—	—
2023	4	109	Ethan Miedema	Canada	LW	—	—	—	—	—	—	—	—	—	—
2023	5	141	Scott Ratzlaff	Canada	G	—	—	—	—	—	—	—	—	—	—
2023	6	173	Sean Keohane	United States	D	—	—	—	—	—	—	—	—	—	—
2023	7	205	Norwin Panocha	Germany	D	—	—	—	—	—	—	—	—	—	—
2024	1	14	Konsta Helenius*	Finland	C	9	1	3	4	0	—	—	—	—	—
2024	2	42	Adam Kleber	United States	D	—	—	—	—	—	—	—	—	—	—
2024	3	71	Brodie Ziemer	United States	RW	—	—	—	—	—	—	—	—	—	—
2024	4	108	Luke Osburn	United States	D	—	—	—	—	—	—	—	—	—	—
2024	4	123	Simon-Pier Brunet	Canada	D	—	—	—	—	—	—	—	—	—	—
2024	6	172	Patrick Geary	United States	D	—	—	—	—	—	—	—	—	—	—
2024	7	204	Vasily Zelenov	Russia	RW	—	—	—	—	—	—	—	—	—	—
2024	7	219	Ryerson Leenders	Canada	G	—	—	—	—	—	—	—	—	—	—
2025	1	9	Radim Mrtka	Czech Republic	D	—	—	—	—	—	—	—	—	—	—
2025	3	71	David Bedkowski	Canada	D	—	—	—	—	—	—	—	—	—	—
2025	4	103	Matous Jan Kucharcik	Czech Republic	C	—	—	—	—	—	—	—	—	—	—
2025	4	116	Samuel Meloche	Canada	G	—	—	—	—	—	—	—	—	—	—
2025	5	135	Noah Laberge	Canada	D	—	—	—	—	—	—	—	—	—	—
2025	6	167	Ashton Schultz	United States	C	—	—	—	—	—	—	—	—	—	—
2025	7	195	Melvin Novotny	Sweden	LW	—	—	—	—	—	—	—	—	—	—
2025	7	199	Yevgeni Prokhorov	Belarus	G	—	—	—	—	—	—	—	—	—	—
2025	7	219	Ryan Rucinski	United States	C	—	—	—	—	—	—	—	—	—	—
2026	1	4	Daxon Rudolph	Canada	D	—	—	—	—	—	—	—	—	—	—
2026	1	20	Ilia Morozov	Russia	C	—	—	—	—	—	—	—	—	—	—
2026	4	124	Olivers Murnieks	Latvia	C	—	—	—	—	—	—	—	—	—	—
2026	5	156	Doman Szongoth	Hungary	C	—	—	—	—	—	—	—	—	—	—
2026	6	188	Dylan Dumont	Canada	RW	—	—	—	—	—	—	—	—	—	—
