= Jiří Novotný (ice hockey) =

Czech ice hockey player (born 1983)

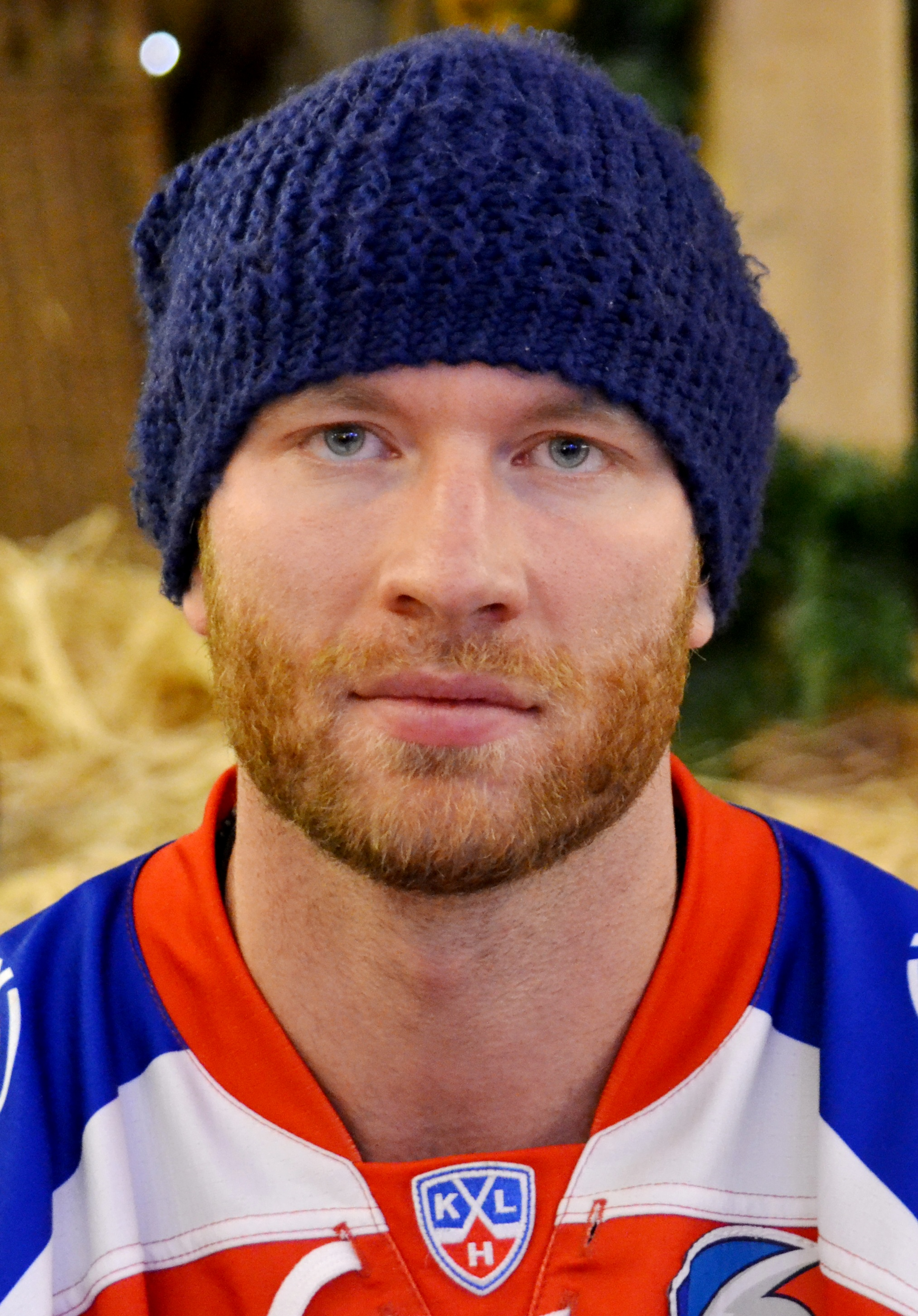
- Born: August 12, 1983 (age 42) Pelhřimov, Czechoslovakia
- Height: 6 ft 2 in (188 cm)
- Weight: 214 lb (97 kg; 15 st 4 lb)
- Position: Centre
- Shot: Right
- Played for: Buffalo Sabres; Washington Capitals; Columbus Blue Jackets; Atlant Moscow Oblast; Barys Astana; Lev Praha; Lokomotiv Yaroslavl; Traktor Chelyabinsk; Lada Togliatti; HC Plzeň; HC Ambrì-Piotta; Motor České Budějovice
- National team: Czech Republic
- NHL draft: 22nd overall, 2001; Buffalo Sabres
- Playing career: 2002–2023

Jiří Novotný (born August 12, 1983) is a Czech former professional ice hockey centre.

== Playing career ==
Novotný was drafted 22nd overall by the Buffalo Sabres in the 2001 NHL entry draft. He spent two seasons with HC České Budějovice in the Czech Republic before moving on to the Sabres' American Hockey League (AHL) affiliate, the Rochester Americans. He made his NHL debut with the Sabres in a January 12, 2006 game against the Phoenix Coyotes.

Novotný's first NHL point came in his second game, when he assisted on a Daniel Paille goal against the Los Angeles Kings on January 14, 2006. His first NHL goal came in his sixth game, against the Florida Panthers on February 11, 2006.

He was traded on February 27, 2007, to the Washington Capitals with a 1st-round pick in the 2007 NHL entry draft for Dainius Zubrus and Timo Helbling. At the conclusion of the season, he was not extended a qualifying offer by the Capitals, making him an unrestricted free agent.

On July 3, 2007, Novotný was signed by the Columbus Blue Jackets to a two-year contract.

On July 2, 2014, he signed a two-year contract with Lokomotiv Yaroslavl, after Lev Praha announced not to participate in 2014–15 KHL season.

Having returned to the Czech Republic to begin the 2018–19 season with HC Plzeň of the ELH, on September 20, 2018, one day prior to the start of the National League, Novotny was signed to a two-month contract worth CHF 500,000 by HC Ambrì-Piotta to replace injured Bryan Lerg. Novotny will make CHF 84,000 out of this contract. On October 25, 2018, his CHF 500,000 contract was extended through the end of the 2018–19 season.

== Career statistics ==
=== Regular season and playoffs ===
			Regular season					Playoffs
Season	Team	League	GP	G	A	Pts	PIM	GP	G	A	Pts	PIM
1999–2000	HC České Budějovice	CZE U18	6	3	2	5	2	5	2	5	7	2
1999–2000	HC České Budějovice	CZE U20	28	8	8	16	6	—	—	—	—	—
2000–01	HC České Budějovice	CZE U20	37	12	14	26	40	6	1	6	7	29
2000–01	HC České Budějovice	ELH	19	0	4	4	2	—	—	—	—	—
2000–01	SHC Vajgar Jindřichův Hradec	CZE.3	—	—	—	—	—	1	0	0	0	0
2001–02	HC České Budějovice	ELH	41	8	6	14	6	—	—	—	—	—
2001–02	SHC Vajgar Jindřichův Hradec	CZE.3	2	1	2	3	0	1	1	3	4	0
2002–03	Rochester Americans	AHL	43	2	9	11	14	3	0	1	1	10
2003–04	Rochester Americans	AHL	48	1	14	15	16	13	0	1	1	10
2004–05	Rochester Americans	AHL	61	5	20	25	36	9	2	2	4	4
2005–06	Rochester Americans	AHL	66	17	37	54	40	—	—	—	—	—
2005–06	Buffalo Sabres	NHL	14	2	1	3	0	4	0	0	0	0
2006–07	Buffalo Sabres	NHL	50	6	7	13	26	—	—	—	—	—
2006–07	Washington Capitals	NHL	18	0	6	6	2	—	—	—	—	—
2007–08	Columbus Blue Jackets	NHL	65	8	14	22	24	—	—	—	—	—
2008–09	Columbus Blue Jackets	NHL	42	4	3	7	14	—	—	—	—	—
2009–10	Atlant Moscow Oblast	KHL	45	12	21	33	8	4	0	1	1	0
2010–11	Barys Astana	KHL	53	13	28	41	78	4	0	0	0	2
2011–12	Barys Astana	KHL	42	9	13	22	22	7	0	3	3	25
2012–13	Lev Praha	KHL	43	6	9	15	18	4	1	0	1	4
2013–14	Lev Praha	KHL	49	11	16	27	22	21	5	4	9	26
2014–15	Lokomotiv Yaroslavl	KHL	59	7	25	32	42	6	1	0	1	4
2015–16	Lokomotiv Yaroslavl	KHL	38	5	7	12	14	5	1	0	1	6
2016–17	Traktor Chelyabinsk	KHL	21	4	4	8	16	6	0	0	0	4
2017–18	Lada Togliatti	KHL	33	4	5	9	24	—	—	—	—	—
2018–19	HC Škoda Plzeň	ELH	2	0	0	0	0	—	—	—	—	—
2018–19	HC Ambrì–Piotta	NL	46	4	11	15	30	5	0	0	0	14
2019–20	HC Ambrì–Piotta	NL	8	0	3	3	2	—	—	—	—	—
2020–21	HC Ambrì–Piotta	NL	46	4	11	15	53	—	—	—	—	—
2021–22	HC Motor České Budějovice	ELH	34	4	4	8	19	10	1	1	2	2
2021–22	HC Samson České Budějovice	CZE.4	4	6	3	9	0	—	—	—	—	—
NHL totals			189	20	31	51	66	4	0	0	0	0
KHL totals			383	71	128	199	244	57	8	8	16	71

=== International ===
Medal record

Representing (Czech Republic) Czech Rep

Ice hockey

World Championships
Gold medal – first place	2010 Cologne	
Bronze medal – third place	2011 Bratislava	
Bronze medal – third place	2012 Helsinki	

Year	Team	Event	Result	GP	G	A	Pts	PIM
2000	Czech Republic	WJC18	6th	6	0	2	2	0
2001	Czech Republic	WJC18	4th	6	3	4	7	2
2002	Czech Republic	WJC	7th	7	0	2	2	4
2003	Czech Republic	WJC	6th	6	0	1	1	2
2007	Czech Republic	WC	7th	6	0	0	0	0
2008	Czech Republic	WC	5th	7	1	1	2	2
2010	Czech Republic	WC	1st place, gold medalist(s)	9	1	5	6	12
2011	Czech Republic	WC	3rd place, bronze medalist(s)	9	0	2	2	0
2012	Czech Republic	WC	3rd place, bronze medalist(s)	10	4	1	5	0
2013	Czech Republic	WC	7th	8	1	1	2	4
2014	Czech Republic	OG	6th	4	0	0	0	0
2014	Czech Republic	WC	4th	10	1	2	3	2
2015	Czech Republic	WC	4th	10	0	3	3	4
Junior totals				25	3	9	12	8
Senior totals				73	8	15	23	24

Awards and achievements
Preceded by Artem Kryukov	Buffalo Sabres first-round draft pick 2001	Succeeded by Keith Ballard
