= Dennis Persson =

Swedish ice hockey player (born 1988)

- Born: June 2, 1988 (age 38) Nyköping, Sweden
- Height: 6 ft 1 in (185 cm)
- Weight: 181 lb (82 kg; 12 st 13 lb)
- Position: Defence
- Shot: Left
- Played for: Djurgårdens IF; Timrå IK; Portland Pirates; Rochester Americans; Brynäs IF; Modo Hockey
- NHL draft: 24th overall, 2006; Buffalo Sabres
- Playing career: 2005–2016

Karl Dennis Persson (born June 2, 1988) is a Swedish former professional ice hockey defenceman. He most notably played in the Swedish Hockey League (SHL).

== Playing career ==
Persson was drafted by the Buffalo Sabres in the first round, 24th overall, in the 2006 NHL entry draft. After two seasons in the then Elitserien with Djurgårdens IF he was signed to a three-year entry-level deal with the Buffalo Sabres on June 3, 2008. He was then loaned to fellow Elitserien club, Timrå IK for the following 2008–09 season, before joining the Sabres American Hockey League affiliate, the Portland Pirates at the conclusion of the Swedish year.

Over the course of his contract with the Sabres, Persson was assigned directly to the AHL in each of his three years. He was an emergency recall for the Sabres during their 2011 playoff series against the Philadelphia Flyers; however, he did not play in a game.

Persson returned to his native Sweden after the Sabres declined to extend his contract, signing with Brynäs IF for two seasons before moving to his fourth SHL club, Modo Hockey on an optional two-year deal on May 5, 2014.

== Career statistics ==
=== Regular season and playoffs ===
			Regular season					Playoffs
Season	Team	League	GP	G	A	Pts	PIM	GP	G	A	Pts	PIM
2004–05	Västerås IK Ungdom	J18 Allsv	3	0	1	1	2	4	0	1	1	0
2004–05	Västerås IK Ungdom	J20	27	3	3	6	24	—	—	—	—	—
2005–06	VIK Västerås HK	J20	28	11	15	26	22	—	—	—	—	—
2005–06	VIK Västerås HK	Allsv	19	0	2	2	6	—	—	—	—	—
2006–07	Djurgårdens IF	J20	11	1	3	4	8	5	2	3	5	2
2006–07	Djurgårdens IF	SEL	9	0	0	0	2	—	—	—	—	—
2006–07	Almtuna IS	Allsv	3	0	0	0	2	—	—	—	—	—
2006–07	Nyköpings Hockey	Allsv	29	4	4	8	38	—	—	—	—	—
2007–08	Djurgårdens IF	J20	4	0	0	0	10	—	—	—	—	—
2007–08	Djurgårdens IF	SEL	21	0	1	1	6	—	—	—	—	—
2007–08	Nyköpings Hockey	SWE.2 U20	3	0	2	2		—	—	—	—	—
2007–08	Nyköpings Hockey	Allsv	21	1	3	4	14	—	—	—	—	—
2008–09	Timrå IK	J20	1	0	0	0	0	—	—	—	—	—
2008–09	Timrå IK	SEL	46	1	5	6	24	7	0	0	0	0
2008–09	Portland Pirates	AHL	8	0	2	2	6	3	0	0	0	0
2009–10	Portland Pirates	AHL	60	1	6	7	16	—	—	—	—	—
2010–11	Portland Pirates	AHL	64	4	13	17	18	11	0	4	4	0
2011–12	Rochester Americans	AHL	39	3	4	7	10	—	—	—	—	—
2012–13	Brynäs IF	SEL	16	1	3	4	6	3	0	0	0	4
2013–14	Brynäs IF	SHL	34	1	2	3	10	5	0	1	1	2
2014–15	Modo Hockey	SHL	48	0	5	5	18	—	—	—	—	—
2015–16	Modo Hockey	SHL	21	2	2	4	4	—	—	—	—	—
2015–16	IF Björklöven	Allsv	10	0	1	1	6	—	—	—	—	—
Allsv totals			82	5	10	15	66	—	—	—	—	—
SHL totals			195	5	18	23	70	15	0	1	1	6
AHL totals			171	8	25	33	50	14	0	4	4	0

=== International ===
Year	Team	Event	Result	GP	G	A	Pts	PIM
2006	Sweden	WJC18	6th	6	1	5	6	8
Junior totals				6	1	5	6	8

Awards and achievements
Preceded by Marek Zagrapan	Buffalo Sabres first-round draft pick 2006	Succeeded by Tyler Myers
