= Artyom Kryukov =

Russian ice hockey player (born 1982)

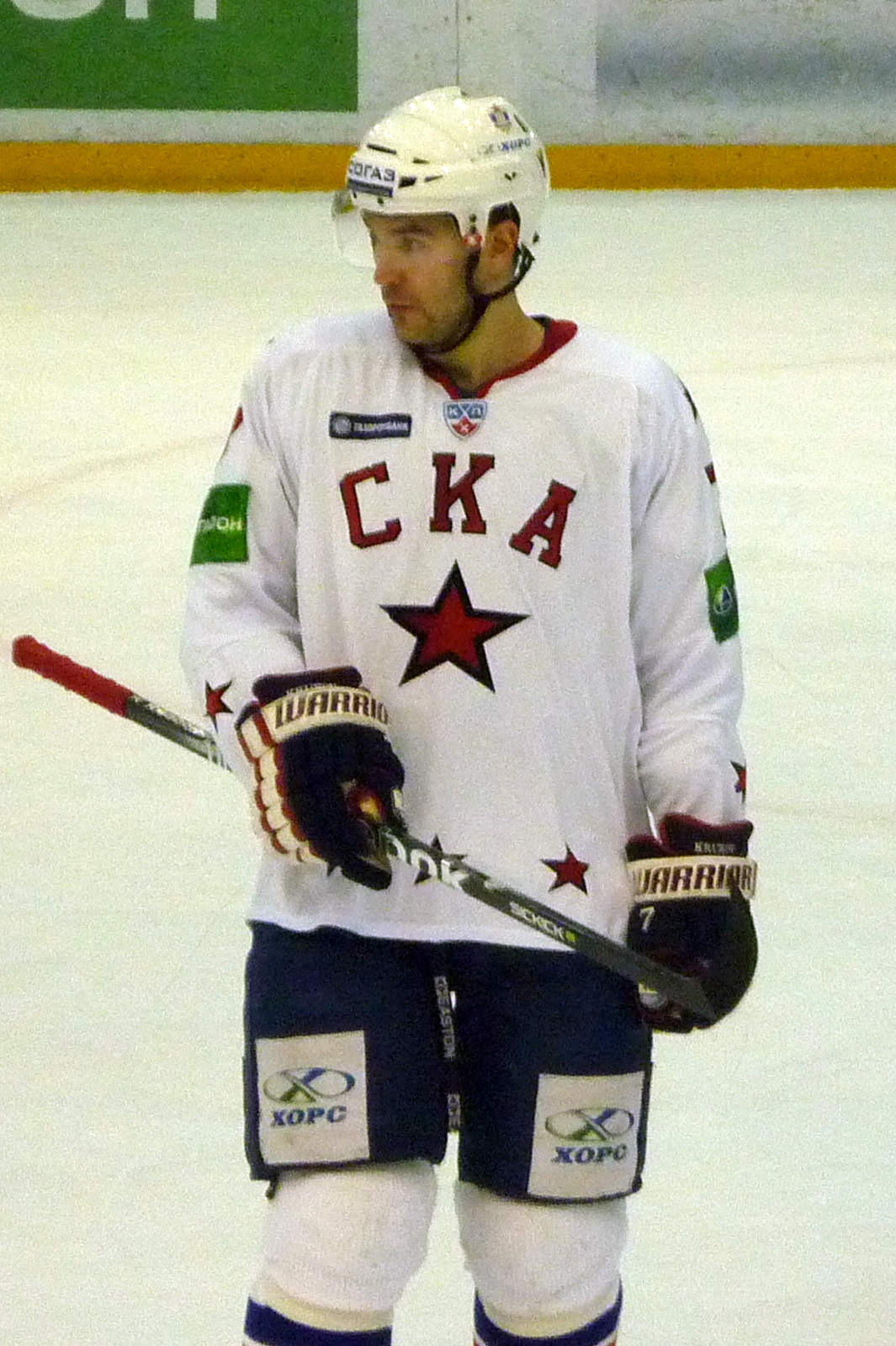
- Born: March 5, 1982 (age 44) Novosibirsk, Soviet Union
- Height: 6 ft 4 in (193 cm)
- Weight: 214 lb (97 kg; 15 st 4 lb)
- Position: Forward
- Shot: Right
- Played for: Lokomotiv Yaroslavl; SKA Saint Petersburg; HC Sibir Novosibirsk; HC Vityaz Podolsk; Avtomobilist Yekaterinburg; Amur Khabarovsk; HC Sochi; Severstal Cherepovets
- NHL draft: 15th overall, 2000; Buffalo Sabres
- Playing career: 2000–2016

Artyom Kryukov (born March 5, 1982) is a Russian former professional ice hockey forward who played in the Kontinental Hockey League (KHL). He was drafted by the Buffalo Sabres in the first round, 15th overall, of the 2000 NHL entry draft.

== Playing career ==
Despite his high draft status, Kryukov never played a professional game in North America, spending his entire career in his native Russia. He has played for Lokomotiv Yaroslavl. HC Sibir Novosibirsk, Vityaz Chekhov, and SKA Saint Petersburg in the Kontinental Hockey League. Kryukov missed the entire 2009–10 KHL season due to a knee injury suffered in the pre-season.

On May 19, 2014, Kryukov signed a one-year contract as a free agent with expansion club HC Sochi.

== Career statistics ==
			Regular season					Playoffs
Season	Team	League	GP	G	A	Pts	PIM	GP	G	A	Pts	PIM
1998–99	Torpedo–2 Yaroslavl	RUS.3	20	2	2	4	6	—	—	—	—	—
1999–2000	Torpedo Yaroslavl	RSL	3	0	0	0	4	—	—	—	—	—
1999–2000	Torpedo–2 Yaroslavl	RUS.3	15	4	5	9	14	—	—	—	—	—
2000–01	SKA St. Petersburg	RSL	14	0	2	2	12	—	—	—	—	—
2000–01	Lokomotiv Yaroslavl	RSL	6	0	0	0	4	11	0	0	0	8
2001–02	Lokomotiv Yaroslavl	RSL	19	1	3	4	16	5	1	0	1	8
2002–03	Sibir Novosibirsk	RSL	9	0	0	0	27	—	—	—	—	—
2003–04	Lokomotiv Yaroslavl	RSL	4	0	2	2	0	—	—	—	—	—
2003–04	Lokomotiv–2 Yaroslavl	RUS.3	30	5	4	9	26	—	—	—	—	—
2004–05	Lokomotiv Yaroslavl	RSL	60	8	9	17	44	7	1	0	1	4
2005–06	Lokomotiv Yaroslavl	RSL	33	1	2	3	42	1	0	0	0	0
2005–06	Lokomotiv–2 Yaroslavl	RUS.3	6	3	3	6	18	—	—	—	—	—
2006–07	Vityaz Chekhov	RSL	12	0	0	0	20	—	—	—	—	—
2006–07	Vityaz–2 Chekhov	RUS.3	6	2	5	7	8	—	—	—	—	—
2006–07	Lokomotiv Yaroslavl	RSL	19	1	3	4	20	—	—	—	—	—
2006–07	Lokomotiv–2 Yaroslavl	RUS.3	13	4	10	14	10	—	—	—	—	—
2007–08	SKA St. Petersburg	RSL	51	7	8	15	54	9	0	2	2	8
2008–09	SKA St. Petersburg	KHL	50	8	3	11	48	—	—	—	—	—
2010–11	HC VMF St. Petersburg	VHL	2	0	0	0	4	—	—	—	—	—
2010–11	SKA St. Petersburg	KHL	25	1	4	5	14	4	0	0	0	0
2011–12	Sibir Novosibirsk	KHL	44	6	9	15	52	—	—	—	—	—
2012–13	HC Ryazan	VHL	5	0	1	1	4	—	—	—	—	—
2012–13	Avtomobilist Yekaterinburg	KHL	19	4	4	8	12	—	—	—	—	—
2013–14	Amur Khabarovsk	KHL	23	1	4	5	20	—	—	—	—	—
2014–15	HC Sochi	KHL	39	3	4	7	34	1	0	0	0	4
2015–16	Severstal Cherepovets	KHL	16	1	1	2	31	—	—	—	—	—
RSL totals			230	18	29	47	243	33	2	2	4	28
KHL totals			216	24	29	53	211	5	0	0	0	4

== Honours ==
- Russian championship: 2002 (with Lokomotiv Yaroslavl)

Awards and achievements
Preceded by Barrett Heisten	Buffalo Sabres first-round draft pick 2000	Succeeded by Jiří Novotný
