= Drew Stafford =

American ice hockey player (born 1985)

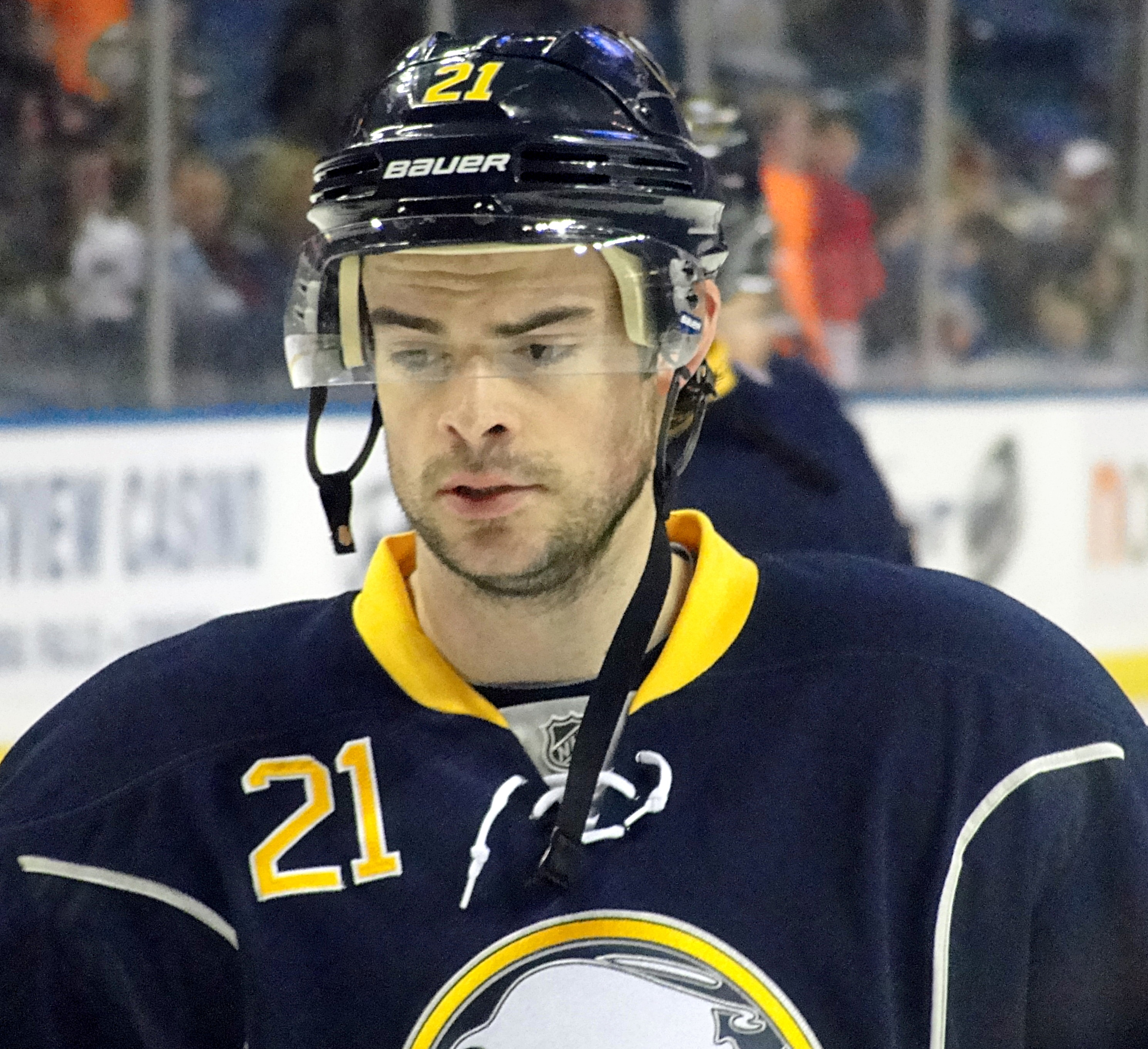
- Stafford with the Buffalo Sabres in 2012
- Born: October 30, 1985 (age 41) Milwaukee, Wisconsin, U.S.
- Height: 6 ft 2 in (188 cm)
- Weight: 202 lb (92 kg; 14 st 6 lb)
- Position: Right wing
- Shot: Right
- Played for: Buffalo Sabres; Winnipeg Jets; Boston Bruins; New Jersey Devils
- National team: United States
- NHL draft: 13th overall, 2004; Buffalo Sabres
- Playing career: 2006–2019

Drew Stafford (born October 30, 1985) is an American former professional ice hockey right winger. Stafford was drafted in the first round, 13th overall by the Buffalo Sabres in the 2004 NHL entry draft, and has played for the Sabres, Winnipeg Jets, Boston Bruins, and the New Jersey Devils of the National Hockey League (NHL).

== Early life ==
Stafford was born in Milwaukee, Wisconsin, but grew up in Faribault, Minnesota. As a teenager, he played AAA hockey with the Milwaukee Jr Admirals. His father, Gordie, played professional hockey in the International Hockey League (IHL) and is the director of girls hockey at Shattuck-Saint Mary's in Faribault, where Drew also played high school hockey. Stafford's uncle, Barrie Stafford, was the head equipment manager for the Edmonton Oilers for 28 years before retiring in 2012.

== Playing career ==
=== Amateur ===
Stafford played for the St. Albert Bantam AA Flyers in St. Albert, Alberta, in 1999–2000. During the season, he finished third in League scoring with 26 goals and 47 points in 30 games while leading his team to a provincial berth. At the conclusion of the season, Stafford was selected to participate in Hockey Alberta's elite development program as a member of the Northwest Sharks in the 2000 Pioneer Chrysler Alberta Cup.

Stafford played at Shattuck-Saint Mary's in Faribault, Minnesota, for two years and played on the US national team at the 2003 IIHF World U18 Championships. He then played for three seasons at the University of North Dakota and on the US national team at the 2004 and 2005 World Junior Ice Hockey Championships. Following his freshman season, Stafford was drafted 13th overall in the 2004 NHL entry draft by the Buffalo Sabres. After two more seasons, he signed a professional contract with the Sabres in 2006, foregoing his senior season at the University of North Dakota. Stafford finished his three-year collegiate career with 118 points (48 goals and 70 assists).

=== Professional ===
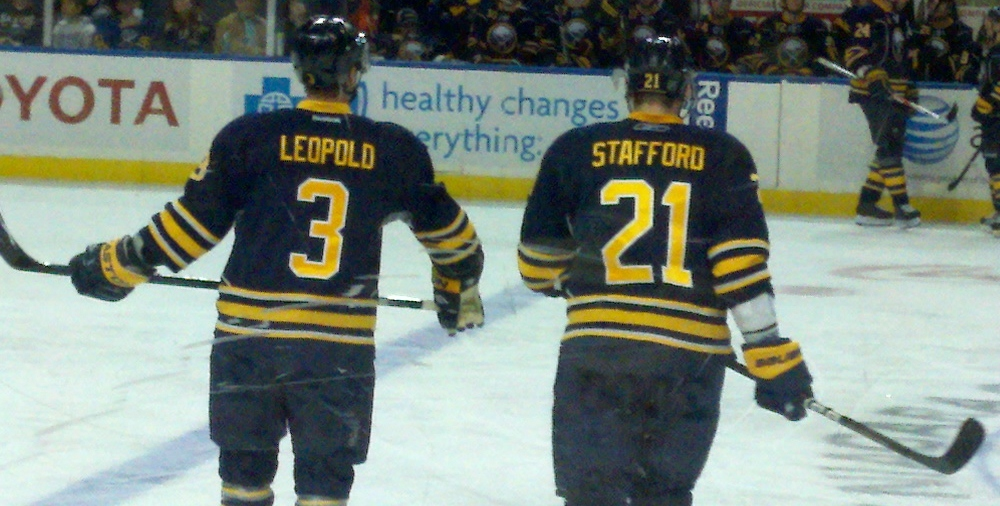
Stafford skating with teammate Jordan Leopold in 2011

==== Buffalo Sabres ====
Stafford began his professional career with Buffalo's American Hockey League (AHL) affiliate, the Rochester Americans. With nine points in the first 11 games of the season, he caught the attention of Sabres management, and was called up to Buffalo in early November to replace injured winger Maxim Afinogenov. In his NHL debut on November 5 against the New York Rangers, Stafford assisted on a game-winning overtime goal by Daniel Brière, earning his first NHL point. On November 11, he scored his first goal in the NHL on the Philadelphia Flyers' Antero Niittymäki. He won NHL Rookie of the Month honors for March 2007 despite the fact that Paul Stastny of the Colorado Avalanche had his record-breaking rookie scoring streak in the same month. Stafford scored his first game-winning goal on February 27 against the Toronto Maple Leafs.

Stafford became a regular in the Sabres' lineup during the 2007–08 season, scoring his first career hat-trick against the Atlanta Thrashers on January 18, 2008. More than a year later, he went on to score his second hat-trick in a 10–2 rout of the Edmonton Oilers on January 27, 2009. A little less than a year after that, he celebrated his third hat-trick on December 15, 2010, against the Boston Bruins. He added his fourth, also against Boston, on January 1, 2011, his fifth on February 8, 2011 against the Tampa Bay Lightning, and his sixth on February 13, 2011, against the New York Islanders. On June 3, 2011, Stafford signed a four-year, $16 million contract extension with the Sabres.

==== Winnipeg Jets ====
In his ninth season with the Sabres in 2014–15, on February 11, 2015, Stafford was traded alongside Tyler Myers, Brendan Lemieux, Joel Armia and a 2015 first-round draft pick (Jack Roslovic) to the Winnipeg Jets in exchange for Evander Kane, Zach Bogosian and the rights to goaltending prospect Jason Kasdorf. On February 14, 2015, in just his second game on the Jets, Stafford scored a goal in regulation, as well as the shootout winner, in a 5–4 shootout victory over the Detroit Red Wings. On February 6, 2016, during a game against the Colorado Avalanche, Stafford hit Nick Holden in the face with a high stick, earning him a one game suspension. On the eve of free-agency Stafford re-signed to a two-year contract to remain in Winnipeg on June 30, 2015.

==== Boston Bruins ====
On March 1, 2017, Stafford was traded from Winnipeg to the Boston Bruins for a conditional 6th round pick in the 2018 NHL entry draft. On March 4, Stafford played in his first Bruins game, racking up his first scoring point as a Bruin by assisting on Ryan Spooner's game-winning goal against the New Jersey Devils for a 3-2 home ice win at TD Garden. Stafford scored his first Bruins goal on March 8, Boston's third goal en route to a 6-1 home ice defeat of the visiting Detroit Red Wings.

==== New Jersey Devils ====
On August 25, 2017, Stafford signed a one-year, $800,000 contract with the New Jersey Devils. In 59 games with the club, Stafford recorded eight goals and 15 points in 59 games.

On September 7, 2018, Stafford signed a professional tryout agreement to attend the Devils' training camp. On October 5, the Devils signed Stafford to a one-year, $810,000 contract.

On January 4, 2019, Stafford scored the game-winning shootout goal in his 800th regular season NHL game.

On September 4, 2019, it was announced that Stafford would attend the Minnesota Wild's training camp on a professional tryout.

== Personal life ==
Stafford was born in Milwaukee, when his father, Gord Stafford, played professional hockey with the Milwaukee Admirals of the International Hockey League and the Wichita Wind of the Central Hockey League during the 1980s. Stafford formed a band called Red Seal Peach while at the University of North Dakota with goaltender Jordan Parise. Stafford appears in the Every Time I Die video for "Decayin with the Boys," playing Jenga at a party in full hockey uniform.

== Career statistics ==
=== Regular season and playoffs ===
			Regular season					Playoffs
Season	Team	League	GP	G	A	Pts	PIM	GP	G	A	Pts	PIM
2001–02	Shattuck–Saint Mary's	HSMN	45	35	53	88	30	—	—	—	—	—
2002–03	Shattuck–Saint Mary's	HSMN	64	49	67	116	48	—	—	—	—	—
2003–04	University of North Dakota	WCHA	36	11	21	32	30	—	—	—	—	—
2004–05	University of North Dakota	WCHA	40	13	22	35	34	—	—	—	—	—
2005–06	University of North Dakota	WCHA	41	24	23	47	63	—	—	—	—	—
2006–07	Rochester Americans	AHL	34	22	22	44	30	—	—	—	—	—
2006–07	Buffalo Sabres	NHL	41	13	14	27	33	10	2	2	4	4
2007–08	Buffalo Sabres	NHL	64	16	22	38	51	—	—	—	—	—
2008–09	Buffalo Sabres	NHL	79	20	25	45	29	—	—	—	—	—
2009–10	Buffalo Sabres	NHL	71	14	20	34	35	3	0	0	0	0
2010–11	Buffalo Sabres	NHL	62	31	21	52	34	7	1	2	3	2
2011–12	Buffalo Sabres	NHL	80	20	30	50	46	—	—	—	—	—
2012–13	Buffalo Sabres	NHL	46	6	12	18	21	—	—	—	—	—
2013–14	Buffalo Sabres	NHL	70	16	18	34	39	—	—	—	—	—
2014–15	Buffalo Sabres	NHL	50	9	15	24	39	—	—	—	—	—
2014–15	Winnipeg Jets	NHL	26	9	10	19	8	4	1	1	2	0
2015–16	Winnipeg Jets	NHL	78	21	17	38	28	—	—	—	—	—
2016–17	Winnipeg Jets	NHL	40	4	9	13	12	—	—	—	—	—
2016–17	Boston Bruins	NHL	18	4	4	8	12	6	2	0	2	2
2017–18	New Jersey Devils	NHL	59	8	7	15	10	2	0	0	0	10
2018–19	New Jersey Devils	NHL	57	5	8	13	18	—	—	—	—	—
NHL totals			841	196	232	428	415	32	6	5	11	18

=== International ===
Medal record

ice hockey

Representing the United States

World Junior Championships
Gold medal – first place	2004 Helsinki	

Year	Team	Event	Result	GP	G	A	Pts	PIM
2002	United States	U18	5th	5	1	2	3	14
2003	United States	WJC18	4th	6	3	2	5	8
2004	United States	WJC	1st place, gold medalist(s)	6	0	2	2	2
2005	United States	WJC	4th	7	5	4	9	14
2006	United States	WC	7th	7	0	1	1	0
2008	United States	WC	6th	7	1	3	4	6
2009	United States	WC	4th	9	2	1	3	6
Junior totals				24	9	10	19	38
Senior totals				23	3	5	8	12

== Awards and honors ==
Award	Year
College
All-WCHA Third Team	2006
AHL
All-Star Classic	2007

Awards and achievements
Preceded by Thomas Vanek	Buffalo Sabres first-round draft pick 2004	Succeeded by Marek Zagrapan
