= David Hruška =

Czech ice hockey player

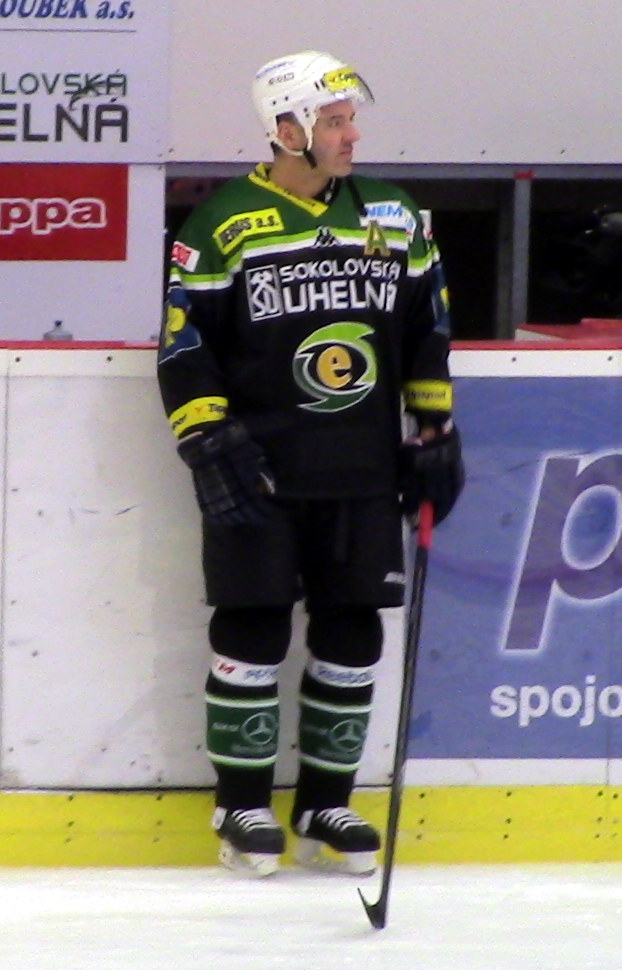
- Born: January 8, 1977 (age 49) Sokolov, Czechoslovakia
- Height: 5 ft 11 in (180 cm)
- Weight: 207 lb (94 kg; 14 st 11 lb)
- Position: Right wing
- Shot: Right
- 2.liga team Former teams: HC Stadion Cheb; VHK Vsetín; HC Slezan Opava; HC Karlovy Vary; HC Havířov Panthers; Klotem Flyers; HC Litvínov; HC Slavia Praha; Piráti Chomutov
- NHL draft: 131st overall, 1995; Ottawa Senators
- Playing career: 1996–2020

David Hruška (born January 8, 1977) is a Czech professional ice hockey right winger for HC Stadion Cheb of the Czech 2.liga. He was selected by the Ottawa Senators in the 6th round (131st overall) of the 1995 NHL entry draft.

Hruška played 857 games in Czech Extraliga with VHK Vsetín, HC Slezan Opava, HC Karlovy Vary, HC Havířov Panthers, HC Litvínov, HC Slavia Praha and Piráti Chomutov.

== Career statistics ==
=== Regular season and playoffs ===
| | | | Regular season | | | | | Playoffs |
| Season | Team | League | GP | G | A | Pts | PIM | GP | G | A | Pts | PIM |
|---|---|---|---|---|---|---|---|---|---|---|---|---|
| 1993–94 | HC Baník CHZ Sokolov | CZE.2 | — | — | — | — | — | — | — | — | — | — |
| 1994–95 | HC Baník CHZ Sokolov | CZE.2 | 5 | 2 | 4 | 6 | 4 | — | — | — | — | — |
| 1995–96 | Red Deer Rebels | WHL | 28 | 14 | 14 | 28 | 6 | — | — | — | — | — |
| 1995–96 | HC Dadák Vsetín | ELH | 5 | 1 | 0 | 1 | 0 | 1 | 0 | 0 | 0 | 0 |
| 1996–97 | HC Petra Vsetín | ELH | 18 | 4 | 2 | 6 | 2 | 6 | 2 | 2 | 4 | 0 |
| 1996–97 | HC Baník CHZ Sokolov | CZE.2 | 4 | 3 | 0 | 3 | — | — | — | — | — | — |
| 1997–98 | HC Petra Vsetín | ELH | 14 | 3 | 0 | 3 | 0 | — | — | — | — | — |
| 1998–99 | HC Opava | ELH | 3 | 1 | 0 | 1 | 0 | — | — | — | — | — |
| 1999–2000 | HC Becherovka Karlovy Vary | ELH | 43 | 17 | 10 | 27 | 10 | — | — | — | — | — |
| 1999–2000 | SK Kadaň | CZE.2 | 1 | 1 | 0 | 1 | 0 | — | — | — | — | — |
| 2000–01 | HC Becherovka Karlovy Vary | ELH | 50 | 14 | 5 | 19 | 12 | — | — | — | — | — |
| 2001–02 | HC Havířov Panthers | ELH | 23 | 17 | 12 | 29 | 2 | — | — | — | — | — |
| 2001–02 | HC Chemopetrol | ELH | 19 | 14 | 3 | 17 | 0 | — | — | — | — | — |
| 2001–02 | Kloten Flyers | NLA | — | — | — | — | — | 1 | 0 | 0 | 0 | 0 |
| 2002–03 | HC Slavia Praha | ELH | 37 | 13 | 13 | 26 | 10 | 15 | 2 | 2 | 4 | 0 |
| 2003–04 | HC Slavia Praha | ELH | 51 | 18 | 19 | 37 | 12 | 19 | 4 | 5 | 9 | 12 |
| 2004–05 | HC Slavia Praha | ELH | 41 | 8 | 4 | 12 | 6 | 7 | 2 | 1 | 3 | 0 |
| 2005–06 | HC Slavia Praha | ELH | 51 | 11 | 9 | 20 | 24 | 15 | 2 | 2 | 4 | 2 |
| 2006–07 | HC Slavia Praha | ELH | 52 | 23 | 9 | 32 | 22 | 6 | 1 | 2 | 3 | 0 |
| 2007–08 | HC Slavia Praha | ELH | 52 | 22 | 13 | 35 | 16 | 19 | 6 | 10 | 16 | 16 |
| 2008–09 | HC Slavia Praha | ELH | 52 | 31 | 14 | 45 | 16 | 18 | 3 | 5 | 8 | 2 |
| 2009–10 | HC Slavia Praha | ELH | 35 | 7 | 6 | 13 | 14 | — | — | — | — | — |
| 2009–10 | KLH Chomutov | CZE.2 | 10 | 4 | 14 | 18 | 6 | 16 | 8 | 4 | 12 | 2 |
| 2010–11 | HC Energie Karlovy Vary | ELH | 34 | 19 | 13 | 32 | 16 | — | — | — | — | — |
| 2010–11 | KLH Chomutov | CZE.2 | 14 | 4 | 3 | 7 | 0 | — | — | — | — | — |
| 2011–12 | Piráti Chomutov | CZE.2 | 52 | 27 | 28 | 55 | 22 | 17 | 6 | 9 | 15 | 12 |
| 2012–13 | Piráti Chomutov | ELH | 49 | 22 | 17 | 39 | 20 | — | — | — | — | — |
| 2013–14 | Piráti Chomutov | ELH | 52 | 18 | 14 | 32 | 32 | — | — | — | — | — |
| 2014–15 | HC Energie Karlovy Vary | ELH | 50 | 12 | 14 | 26 | 26 | — | — | — | — | — |
| 2015–16 | HC Energie Karlovy Vary | ELH | 6 | 0 | 0 | 0 | 6 | — | — | — | — | — |
| 2015–16 | HC Slavia Praha | CZE.2 | 41 | 12 | 16 | 28 | 18 | 8 | 4 | 1 | 5 | 0 |
| 2016–17 | HC Baník Sokolov | CZE.3 | 5 | 3 | 6 | 9 | 4 | — | — | — | — | — |
| 2016–17 | EHC Wattens | AUT.4 | 19 | 19 | 16 | 35 | 2 | 3 | 1 | 1 | 2 | 2 |
| 2017–18 | HC Baník Sokolov | CZE.3 | 29 | 24 | 14 | 38 | 16 | 7 | 5 | 4 | 9 | 2 |
| 2018–19 | HC Baník Sokolov | CZE.3 | 35 | 12 | 14 | 26 | 12 | 11 | 5 | 6 | 11 | 2 |
| 2019–20 | HC Stadion Cheb | CZE.4 | 7 | 8 | 6 | 14 | 4 | 4 | 4 | 1 | 5 | 29 |
| ELH totals | | | 737 | 275 | 177 | 452 | 246 | 106 | 22 | 29 | 51 | 32 |

=== International ===
| Year | Team | Event | GP | G | A | Pts | PIM |
|---|---|---|---|---|---|---|---|
| 1995 | Czech Republic | EJC | 5 | 2 | 4 | 6 | 4 |
| 1997 | Czech Republic | WJC | 7 | 0 | 1 | 1 | 2 |
| Junior totals | | | 12 | 2 | 5 | 7 | 6 |
