= Petr Pavlas =

Czech ice hockey player

- Born: February 4, 1968 (age 58) Olomouc, Czech Republic
- Height: 5 ft 9 in (175 cm)
- Weight: 191 lb (87 kg; 13 st 9 lb)
- Position: Defense
- Shot: Left
- Played for: TJ Gottwaldov/Zlín; HK Dukla Trenčín; HC Pardubice; Hradec Králové; Tappara; HC Železárny Třinec; HC Olomouc; HC Karlovy Vary; HC Havířov Panthers; Kloten Flyers; HC Slovan Bratislava
- NHL draft: 183rd overall, 1988; Washington Capitals
- Playing career: 1988–2009

Petr Pavlas (born 4 February 1968) is a Czech former professional ice hockey player who played with HC Slovan Bratislava in the Slovak Extraliga.

Pavlas also previously played for HC Olomouc, HC Zlín, HC Pardubice, Tappara Tampere, Kokkolan Hermes, HC Oceláři Třinec, HC Karlovy Vary and HC Havířov.

He ended his active career in November 2008.

== Career statistics ==
			Regular season					Playoffs
Season	Team	League	GP	G	A	Pts	PIM	GP	G	A	Pts	PIM
1984–85	HC Olomouc U20	Czech U20	34	10	10	20	—	—	—	—	—	—
1985–86	HC Olomouc U20	Czech U20	34	22	30	52	—	—	—	—	—	—
1985–86	TJ DS Olomouc	Czech	—	2	—	—	—	—	—	—	—	—
1986–87	TJ Gottwaldov	Czech	30	1	2	3	10	6	2	1	3	—
1987–88	HK Dukla Trencin	Czech	31	8	9	17	—	—	—	—	—	—
1988–89	HK Dukla Trencin	Czech	31	14	15	29	20	11	4	6	10	—
1989–90	TJ Zlin	Czech	50	13	16	29	—	—	—	—	—	—
1990–91	AC ZPS Zlín	Czech	52	14	20	34	16	—	—	—	—	—
1991–92	AC ZPS Zlín	Czech	35	7	20	27	33	4	1	1	2	—
1992–93	HC Pardubice	Czech	30	6	22	28	—	—	—	—	—	—
1993–94	HC Pardubice	Czech	21	10	9	19	12	—	—	—	—	—
1993–94	HC Stadion Hradec Králové	Czech	21	4	11	15	10	—	—	—	—	—
1994–95	Tappara	Liiga	18	1	4	5	6	—	—	—	—	—
1994–95	Kokkolan Hermes	I-Divisioona	7	7	4	11	2	—	—	—	—	—
1994–95	KOOVEE	I-Divisioona	1	0	0	0	0	—	—	—	—	—
1994–95	HC Železárny Třinec	Czech2	—	—	—	—	—	—	—	—	—	—
1995–96	HC Zelezarny Trinec	Czech	13	1	3	4	10	—	—	—	—	—
1995–96	HC Prerov	Czech2	32	7	18	25	—	—	—	—	—	—
1996–97	HC Olomouc	Czech	44	11	17	28	4	—	—	—	—	—
1997–98	HC Becherovka Karlovy Vary	Czech	47	7	18	25	12	—	—	—	—	—
1998–99	HC Becherovka Karlovy Vary	Czech	44	7	14	21	43	—	—	—	—	—
1999–00	HC Becherovka Karlovy Vary	Czech	50	5	30	35	28	—	—	—	—	—
2000–01	HC Havirov	Czech	37	4	15	19	28	—	—	—	—	—
2001–02	HC Havirov Panthers	Czech	44	6	22	28	40	—	—	—	—	—
2001–02	Kloten Flyers	NLA	—	—	—	—	—	6	0	0	0	2
2002–03	HC Havirov Panthers	Czech	7	0	4	4	6	—	—	—	—	—
2002–03	HC Slovan Bratislava	Slovak	35	8	16	24	41	13	2	4	6	2
2003–04	HC Slovan Bratislava	Slovak	51	15	32	47	42	12	3	8	11	8
2004–05	HC Slovan Bratislava	Slovak	51	8	29	37	47	18	1	9	10	8
2005–06	HC Slovan Bratislava	Slovak	52	5	36	41	28	4	0	0	0	12
2006–07	HC Slovan Bratislava	Slovak	51	7	27	34	52	14	2	12	14	2
2007–08	HC Slovan Bratislava	Slovak	39	4	25	29	45	16	1	9	10	16
2008–09	HC Slovan Bratislava	Slovak	22	1	10	11	4	—	—	—	—	—
2008–09	HC Unicov	Czech3	18	8	19	27	10	—	—	—	—	—
2009–10	HC Unicov	Czech3	27	15	23	38	55	—	—	—	—	—
2009–10	HC Prerov	Czech3	5	0	5	5	4	8	1	3	4	14
2010–11	HC Unicov	Czech3	6	6	3	9	7	—	—	—	—	—
Czech totals			587	118	247	365	272	25	8	8	16	0
Slovak totals			301	48	175	223	259	77	9	42	51	48
