= Petr Čajánek =

Czech ice hockey player (born 1975)

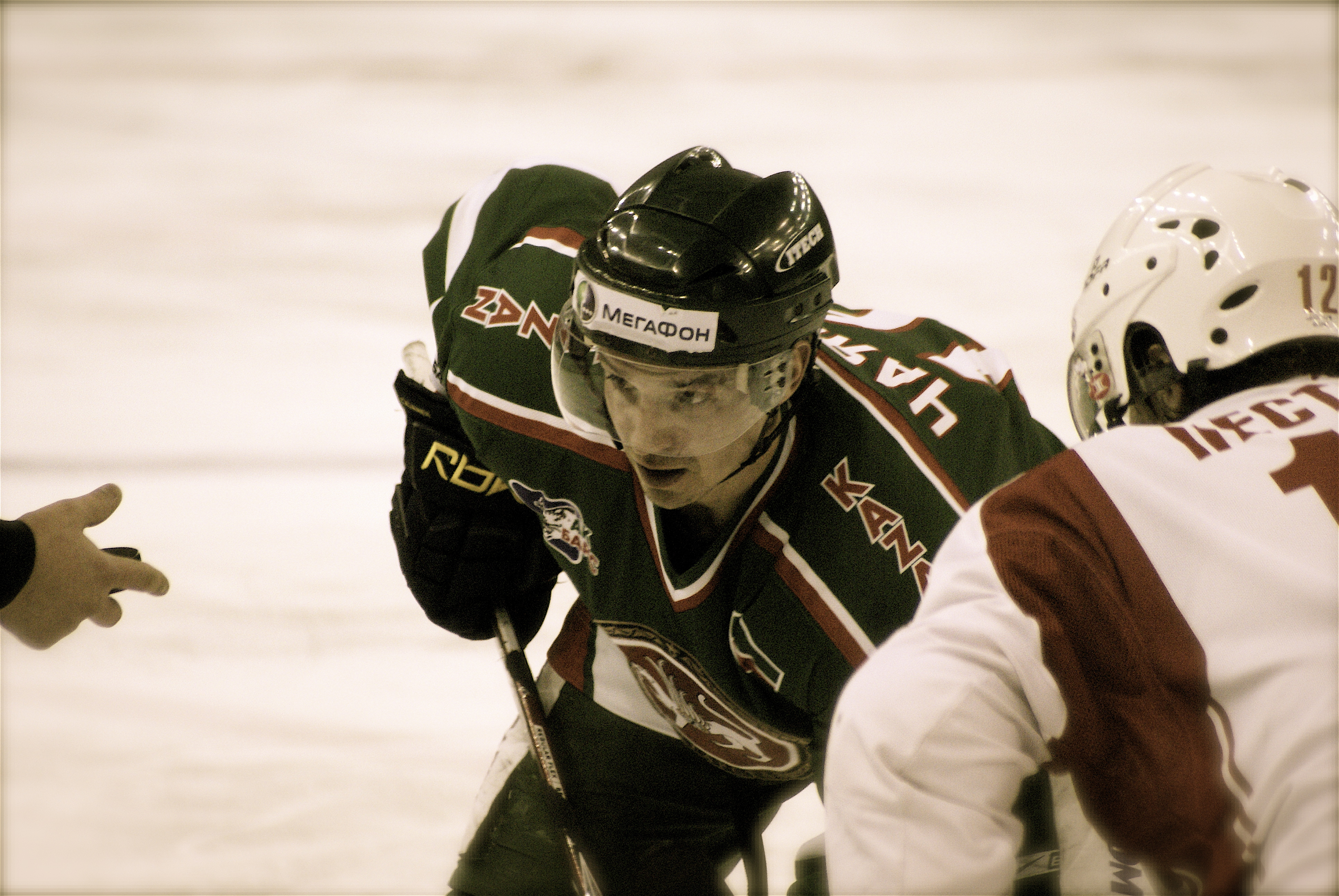
- Čajánek in 2008 with Ak Bars Kazan
- Born: August 18, 1975 (age 49); Gottwaldov, Czechoslovakia
- Height: 5 ft 11 in (180 cm)
- Weight: 176 lb (80 kg; 12 st 8 lb)
- Position: Right wing
- Shot: Left
- Played for: PSG Zlín; St. Louis Blues; Ak Bars Kazan; Dynamo Moscow; SKA Saint Petersburg
- National team: Czech Republic
- NHL draft: 253rd overall, 2001; St. Louis Blues
- Playing career: 1993–2015

Petr Čajánek
Medal record

Representing Czech Republic

World Championships
Gold medal – first place	2000 St.Petersburg	
Gold medal – first place	2001 Nuremberg	
Gold medal – first place	2005 Vienna	Ice hockey

Winter Olympic Games
Bronze medal – third place	2006 Turin	Ice hockey

Petr Čajánek (Czech pronunciation: [ˈpɛtr̩ ˈtʃajaːnɛk]; born August 18, 1975) is a Czech former professional ice hockey forward. He played in the National Hockey League (NHL) with the St. Louis Blues from 2002 to 2007. The rest of his career, which lasted from 1993 to 2015, was mainly spent in the Czech Extraliga. He was selected by the Blues in the seventh round, 253rd overall, in the 2001 NHL entry draft. Internationally he played for the Czech national team at several tournaments, including the 2002, 2006, and 2010 Winter Olympics, winning a bronze medal in 2006, and several Ice Hockey World Championships, winning gold medals in 2000, 2001, and 2005.

== Playing career ==
Petr Čajánek played for HC Zlín from 1993 to 2002. In the 2001–02 season, he was Czech Extraliga's leading scorer.

In the 2001 NHL entry draft, he was drafted in the seventh round, 253rd overall, by the St. Louis Blues. He was signed to an NHL contract on July 3, 2002.

He was re-signed by the Blues on August 5, 2004.

On February 26, 2007, Čajánek was placed on waivers, but he was not claimed by another NHL team and remained with St. Louis. Though he was placed on waivers, the 2006–07 season was his best, as he scored a career-high 48 points, good for third on the Blues.

On October 21, 2007, Čajánek signed a one-year, $900,000 contract to play for Ak Bars Kazan in the Russian Superleague (RSL) for the 2007–08 season.

== Career statistics ==
=== Regular season and playoffs ===
			Regular season					Playoffs
Season	Team	League	GP	G	A	Pts	PIM	GP	G	A	Pts	PIM
1993–94	AC ZPS Zlín	CZE	34	5	4	9	16	3	0	0	0	4
1994–95	AC ZPS Zlín	CZE	35	7	9	16	8	12	2	6	8	4
1994–95	SHK Hodonín	CZE-2	—	—	—	—	—	—	—	—	—	—
1995–96	AC ZPS Zlín	CZE	36	8	11	19	32	8	2	6	8	8
1995–96	HC Havířov	CZE-2	3	0	0	0	—	—	—	—	—	—
1996–97	HC ZPS–Barum Zlín	CZE	50	9	30	39	46	—	—	—	—	—
1997–98	HC ZPS–Barum Zlín	CZE	46	19	27	46	117	—	—	—	—	—
1998–99	HC ZPS–Barum Zlín	CZE	49	15	33	48	123	11	5	7	12	12
1999–00	HC Barum Continental Zlín	CZE	50	23	34	57	66	4	1	0	1	0
2000–01	HC Continental Zlín	CZE	52	18	31	49	105	6	0	4	4	22
2001–02	HC Continental Zlín	CZE	49	20	44	64	64	11	5	7	12	10
2002–03	St. Louis Blues	NHL	51	9	29	38	20	2	0	0	0	2
2003–04	St. Louis Blues	NHL	70	12	14	26	16	5	0	2	2	2
2004–05	HC Hamé Zlín	CZE	49	10	15	25	91	17	5	4	9	24
2005–06	St. Louis Blues	NHL	71	10	31	41	54	—	—	—	—	—
2006–07	St. Louis Blues	NHL	77	15	33	48	54	—	—	—	—	—
2007–08	Peoria Rivermen	AHL	4	1	0	1	0	—	—	—	—	—
2007–08	Ak Bars Kazan	RSL	33	13	20	33	56	10	5	6	11	4
2008–09	Dynamo Moscow	KHL	53	9	23	32	123	12	1	5	6	6
2009–10	SKA Saint Petersburg	KHL	52	21	20	41	74	4	0	4	4	2
2010–11	SKA Saint Petersburg	KHL	51	13	24	37	54	11	2	4	6	2
2011–12	PSG Zlín	CZE	48	6	15	21	96	12	6	3	9	14
2012–13	PSG Zlín	CZE	48	18	26	44	73	19	2	10	12	26
2013–14	PSG Zlín	CZE	49	8	24	32	70	17	4	11	15	12
2014–15	PSG Zlín	CZE	48	12	24	36	112	7	0	5	5	20
ELH totals			643	178	327	505	1019	127	32	63	95	156
NHL totals			269	46	107	153	144	7	0	2	2	4

=== International ===
Year	Team	Event	GP	G	A	Pts	PIM
1995	Czech Republic	WJC	7	3	5	8	63
2000	Czech Republic	WC	9	1	3	4	2
2001	Czech Republic	WC	9	2	6	8	4
2002	Czech Republic	OLY	4	0	0	0	0
2002	Czech Republic	WC	7	3	2	5	2
2004	Czech Republic	WCH	4	1	2	3	0
2005	Czech Republic	WC	9	2	2	4	8
2006	Czech Republic	OLY	7	1	0	1	4
2007	Czech Republic	WC	7	0	2	2	12
2009	Czech Republic	WC	7	5	5	10	10
2010	Czech Republic	OLY	5	0	0	0	6
Junior totals			7	3	5	8	63
Senior totals			68	15	22	37	48
