= Roman Čechmánek =

Czech ice hockey player (1971–2023)

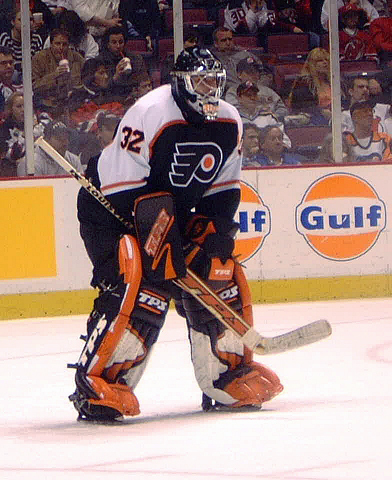
- Čechmánek with the Philadelphia Flyers in March 2003
- Born: 2 March 1971 Gottwaldov, Czechoslovakia
- Died: 11 November 2023 (aged 52) Všemina, Czech Republic
- Height: 6 ft 3 in (191 cm)
- Weight: 211 lb (96 kg; 15 st 1 lb)
- Position: Goaltender
- Caught: Left
- Played for: HC Zlín; HC Jihlava; HC Olomouc; HC Vsetín; Philadelphia Flyers; Los Angeles Kings; HC Karlovy Vary; Hamburg Freezers; Linköpings HC; HC Třinec
- National team: Czech Republic
- NHL draft: 171st overall, 2000; Philadelphia Flyers
- Playing career: 1989–2009

Roman Čechmánek (Czech pronunciation: [ˈroman ˈtʃɛxmaːnɛk]; 2 March 1971 – 11 November 2023) was a Czech professional ice hockey goaltender. He played professionally in the United States, the Czech Republic, and Germany, including in the National Hockey League with the Philadelphia Flyers and Los Angeles Kings from 2000 to 2004. Čechmánek also played for the Czech national team at multiple international tournaments, including seven World Championships.

== Playing career ==
Čechmánek played for HC Vsetín in the Czech Republic from 1994 to 2000. He was drafted in the sixth round as the 171st overall pick of the 2000 NHL entry draft by the Philadelphia Flyers. The Flyers traded veteran John Vanbiesbrouck hoping the newly-opened backup goaltender position would encourage Čechmánek, who had previously rejected offers from other NHL teams to come to North America, to sign a contract, which he did a few weeks after the draft. In his first season with the Flyers, Čechmánek surprised many by capturing the starting job from Brian Boucher and being one of the best goaltenders in the league. In his first season, he played in the NHL All-Star Game and finished second in voting for the Vezina Trophy. He had a disappointing playoff, however, including allowing five goals in an 8–0 loss in the final game of the Flyers' first-round series against the Buffalo Sabres.

The next season Čechmánek had another good year and played fairly well in the first round of the playoffs. However the Philadelphia offense failed, scoring a record-low number of only two goals in five games against the Ottawa Senators. Čechmánek was publicly annoyed at his teammates' performance and was replaced by Boucher in the series-elimination game 5. The next year he had another superior season, sharing the William M. Jennings Trophy with Flyers teammate Robert Esche, and Martin Brodeur of the New Jersey Devils. Čechmánek recorded two shutouts in a second round loss to Ottawa but many blamed him for the loss due to the number of soft goals he allowed in the other four games. At the end of the season he was traded to the Los Angeles Kings for a second-round draft pick.

Playing behind a mediocre Kings team, Čechmánek had a disappointing season in 2003–04. He returned to the Czech Republic to play with his old team HC Vsetín during the cancelled 2004–05 NHL season. He split the 2005–06 hockey season between HC Karlovy Vary and the Hamburg Freezers. In the beginning of 2007, Čechmánek left Linköpings HC and was replaced by Rastislav Staňa. He then played for HC Oceláři Třinec in the Czech Extraliga for three seasons. He retired following the 2008–09 season.

== International play ==
Čechmánek was on the Czech national team at both the 1998 Winter Olympics and 2002 Winter Olympics, but did not play any games, instead serving as backup to goaltender Dominik Hašek. Čechmánek won a gold medal in 1998. His other appearances were in the 1995, 1996, 1997, 1999, 2000, 2004, and 2007 World Championships.

== Personal life and death ==
Čechmánek was born in Gottwaldov, Czechoslovakia on 2 March 1971. He died on 12 November 2023, at the age of 52.

== Career statistics ==
=== Regular season and playoffs ===
			Regular season										Playoffs
Season	Team	League	GP	W	L	T	OTL	MIN	GA	SO	GAA	SV%	GP	W	L	MIN	GA	SO	GAA	SV%
1988–89	TJ Gottwaldov	CSSR Jr	35	—	—	—	—	—	—	—	3.43	—	—	—	—	—	—	—	—	—
1988–89	TJ Gottwaldov	CSSR	1	0	0	0	—	13	0	0	0.00	1.000	—	—	—	—	—	—	—	—
1989–90	TJ Zlín	CSSR	2	0	0	0	—	89	5	0	3.37	.875	—	—	—	—	—	—	—	—
1990–91	ASD Dukla Jihlava	CSSR	9	—	—	—	—	447	18	2	2.42	.909	—	—	—	—	—	—	—	—
1991–92	TJ DS Olomouc	CSSR	13	—	—	—	—	731	54	0	4.43	—	—	—	—	—	—	—	—	—
1991–92	AC ZPS Zlín	CSSR	2	0	1	0	—	67	8	0	7.73	—	—	—	—	—	—	—	—	—
1991–92	SHK Hodonín	CZE-2	—	—	—	—	—	—	—	—	—	—	—	—	—	—	—	—	—	—
1992–93	SHK Hodonín	CZE-2	—	—	—	—	—	—	—	—	—	—	—	—	—	—	—	—	—	—
1993–94	TJ Zbrojovka Vsetín	CZE-2	41	—	—	—	—	—	—	—	1.43	—	—	—	—	—	—	—	—	—
1994–95	HC Dadák Vsetín	CZE	41	21	12	8	—	2,413	98	5	2.44	.923	11	9	2	609	24	1	2.36	.924
1995–96	HC Dadák Vsetín	CZE	36	22	9	5	—	2,081	76	4	2.19	.921	13	12	1	783	17	2	1.30	.957
1996–97	HC Petra Vsetín	CZE	48	31	11	6	—	2,760	100	3	2.17	.929	10	9	1	602	10	2	1.00	.966
1997–98	HC Petra Vsetín	CZE	41	26	11	4	—	2,245	77	8	2.06	.934	10	9	1	600	16	1	1.60	.947
1997–98	HC Petra Vsetín	EuroHL	5	3	2	—	—	307	12	1	2.34	.903	4	2	2	240	10	1	2.50	.915
1998–99	HC Slovnaft Vsetín	CZE	36	22	4	10	—	2,155	67	3	1.87	.938	11	8	3	675	22	1	1.96	.926
1998–99	HC Slovnaft Vsetín	EuroHL	2	0	2	—	—	119	8	0	4.03	—	—	—	—	—	—	—	—	—
1999–00	HC Slovnaft Vsetín	CZE	37	20	10	7	—	2,141	88	2	2.47	.924	9	6	3	543	15	3	1.66	.944
2000–01	Philadelphia Phantoms	AHL	3	1	1	0	—	160	3	0	1.12	.969	—	—	—	—	—	—	—	—
2000–01	Philadelphia Flyers	NHL	59	35	15	6	—	3,431	115	10	2.01	.921	6	2	4	347	18	0	3.12	.891
2001–02	Philadelphia Flyers	NHL	46	24	13	6	—	2,603	89	4	2.05	.921	4	1	3	227	7	1	1.85	.936
2002–03	Philadelphia Flyers	NHL	58	33	15	10	—	3,350	102	6	1.83	.925	13	6	7	867	31	2	2.14	.909
2003–04	Los Angeles Kings	NHL	49	18	21	6	—	2,701	113	5	2.51	.906	—	—	—	—	—	—	—	—
2004–05	Vsetínská Hokejová	CZE	35	15	18	2	—	1,974	88	3	2.67	.922	—	—	—	—	—	—	—	—
2005–06	HC Energie Karlovy Vary	CZE	12	4	7	1	—	594	29	1	2.93	.915	—	—	—	—	—	—	—	—
2005–06	Hamburg Freezers	DEL	27	—	—	—	—	1,535	66	3	2.58	.909	6	2	4	366	17	0	2.78	.910
2006–07	Linköpings HC	SEL	26	10	11	4	—	1,490	67	0	2.70	.905	—	—	—	—	—	—	—	—
2006–07	HC Oceláři Třinec	CZE	6	4	2	—	0	371	12	0	1.94	.948	9	5	4	569	20	0	2.11	.943
2007–08	HC Oceláři Třinec	CZE	18	4	14	—	0	977	53	0	3.25	.916	—	—	—	—	—	—	—	—
2008–09	HC Oceláři Třinec	CZE	34	16	18	—	0	1,823	99	2	3.26	.916	—	—	—	—	—	—	—	—
CZE totals			344	185	116	43	0	19,534	787	31	2.41	.926	73	58	15	4,381	124	10	1.70	.945
NHL totals			212	110	64	28	—	12,086	419	25	2.08	.919	23	9	14	1,440	56	3	2.33	.909

=== International ===
Medal record

Representing Czechoslovakia

Men's ice hockey

European Junior Championships
Silver medal – second place	1989 Soviet Union	

World Junior Championships
Bronze medal – third place	1991 Canada	

Representing Czech Republic

Olympic Games
Gold medal – first place	1998 Nagano	

World Championships
Gold medal – first place	1996 Austria	
Gold medal – first place	1999 Norway	
Gold medal – first place	2000 Russia	
Bronze medal – third place	1997 Finland	
Bronze medal – third place	1998 Switzerland	

Year	Team	Event	GP	W	L	T	MIN	GA	SO	GAA	SV%
1989	Czechoslovakia	EJC	6	—	—	—	319	16	0	3.01	—
1991	Czechoslovakia	WJC	3	—	—	—	151	5	—	1.99	—
1995	Czech Republic	WC	1	0	1	0	60	4	0	4,00	.902
1997	Czech Republic	WC	8	5	3	0	479	17	0	2,13	.929
1998	Czech Republic	WC	2	2	0	0	108	3	0	1,68	.929
1999	Czech Republic	WC	5	3	1	0	197	8	1	2,44	.900
2000	Czech Republic	WC	8	7	1	0	480	16	1	2,00	.925
2004	Czech Republic	WC	1	1	0	0	60	1	0	1,00	.944
2007	Czech Republic	WC	7	3	4	—	418	18	0	2,58	.894
Junior totals			9	—	—	—	470	21	—	2.68	—
Senior totals			32	21	10	0	1,802	67	2	2,23	—

== Awards and honours ==
Award	Year	Ref
Bobby Clarke Trophy	2000–01, 2002–03	
Czech Extraliga Best Goaltender	1994–95, 1995–96, 1996–97, 1997–98, 1998–99	
NHL All-Star Game	2001	
NHL Second All-Star Team	2000–01	
William M. Jennings Trophy	2002–03 (Note: Shared with teammate Robert Esche and Martin Brodeur of the New Jersey Devils.)	
World Championship All-Star Team	2000	

== Notes ==
Preceded by Mark Recchi; Jeremy Roenick	Winner of the Bobby Clarke Trophy; 2001; 2003	Succeeded by Jeremy Roenick; Mark Recchi
Preceded by Patrick Roy	Tri-winner of the Jennings Trophy; 2003; With: Robert Esche and Martin Brodeur	Succeeded by Martin Brodeur
