= 1994–95 Czech 1. Liga season =

1994–95 Czech 1. Liga
- League: Czech 1. Liga
- Sport: Ice hockey
- Duration: September 1994 – April 1995
- Teams: 14

Regular season
- Season champions: HC Kometa Brno
- Top scorer: Svatopluk Hermann (HC Havířov)

Playoffs

Finals
- Champions: HC Kometa Brno and HC Železárny Třinec.
- Runners-up: HC Havířov and HC Vajgar Jindřichův Hradec.

Czech 1. Liga seasons
- ← 1994-95 1995-96 →

The 1994–95 Czech 1.liga season was the second season of the Czech 1.liga, the second level of ice hockey in the Czech Republic. Fourteen teams participated in the league, and HC Kometa Brno and HC Železárny Třinec were directly promoted to the Czech Extraliga.

== Regular season ==
	Club	GP	W	T	L	Goals	Pts
1.	HC Kometa Brno	40	26	7	7	154:98	59
2.	HC Železárny Třinec	40	23	8	9	175:118	54
3.	TJ Slovan Jindřichův Hradec	40	21	8	11	144:117	50
4.	AZ Havířov	40	21	5	14	170:134	47
5.	HC Baník Hodonín	40	19	8	13	135:124	46
6.	H + S Beroun HC	40	20	5	15	140:138	45
7.	HC Slezan Opava	40	18	7	15	147:125	43
8.	HC Lev Hradec Králové	40	16	9	15	123:113	41
9.	HC Slovan Ústí nad Labem	40	14	8	18	120:129	36
10.	BK Havlíčkův Brod	40	15	5	20	131:149	35
11.	IHC Písek	40	14	4	22	121:137	32
12.	HC Prostějov	40	8	11	21	91:149	27
13.	HC Baník Sokolov	40	7	9	24	92:154	23
14.	HC Tábor	40	8	6	26	108:166	22

== Playoffs ==
=== Playoff qualification ===
- HC Baník Hodonín – HC Prostějov 2:1 (3:5, 4:1, 5:2)
- H + S Beroun HC – IHC Písek 2:1 (4:1, 3:5, 3:1)
- HC Slezan Opava – BK Havlíčkův Brod 2:0 (2:1, 3:0)
- HC Lev Hradec Králové – HC Slovan Ústí nad Labem 0:2 (2:5, 1:3)

=== Quarterfinals ===
- HC Kometa Brno – HC Slovan Ústí nad Labem 3:1 (8:3, 3:0, 0:4, 6:3)
- HC Železáři Třinec – HC Slezan Opava 3:0 (5:3, 13:2, 2:0)
- TJ Slovan Jindřichův Hradec – HC Beroun 3:1 (2:3, 7:5, 3:2, 3:1)
- AZ Havířov – HC Baník Hodonín 3:0 (3:1, 4:2, 4:3)

=== Semifinals ===
- HC Kometa Brno – AZ Havířov 3:0 (6:3, 5:0, 3:1)
- HC Železárny Třinec – TJ Slovan Jindřichův Hradec 3:0 (8:0, 4:2, 3:2)

HC Kometa Brno and HC Oceláři Třinec have been directly promoted to the Czech Extraliga.

== Relegation ==
	Club	GP	W	T	L	GF	GA	Pts
1.	HC Slavia Becherovka Karlovy Vary	10	5	4	1	32	22	14
2.	HC Přerov	10	6	1	3	43	30	13
3.	HC Stadion Liberec	10	5	1	4	40	28	11
4.	HC Baník Sokolov	10	4	3	3	32	27	11
5.	SK Horácká Slavia Třebíč	10	3	2	5	27	42	8
6.	HC Tábor	10	1	1	8	29	54	3

HC Tábor has been relegated to the Czech 2. Liga.
