= 2003–04 Czech 1. Liga season =

The 2003–04 Czech 1.liga season was the 11th season of the Czech 1.liga, the second level of ice hockey in the Czech Republic. 14 teams participated in the league, and HC Dukla Jihlava won the championship.

== Regular season ==
	Club	GP	W	OTW	T	OTL	L	Goals	Pts
1.	HC Berounští Medvědi	40	24	4	2	1	9	114:76	83
2.	KLH Chomutov	40	25	1	3	1	10	153:98	81
3.	HC Dukla Jihlava	40	22	4	3	1	10	129:99	78
4.	HC Slovan Ústí nad Labem	40	23	2	1	1	13	131:93	75
5.	HC Olomouc	40	17	5	4	1	13	110:98	66
6.	HC Hradec Králové	40	18	2	2	2	16	134:112	62
7.	SK Horácká Slavia Třebíč	40	16	1	5	3	15	114:110	58
8.	BK Mladá Boleslav	40	15	2	4	4	15	103:102	57
9.	SK Kadaň	40	14	2	6	3	15	112:109	55
10.	HC Havířov	40	12	1	5	3	19	107:133	46
11.	HC Prostějov	40	12	1	2	3	22	95:126	43
12.	IHC Písek	40	10	2	4	2	22	94:127	40
13.	HC Slezan Opava	40	7	3	7	5	18	92:134	39
14.	HC Kometa Brno	40	10	0	2	0	28	84:155	32

== Playoffs ==
=== Quarterfinals ===
- HC Beroun – BK Mladá Boleslav 3:0 (5:3, 5:1, 3:2 SN)
- KLH Chomutov – SK Horácká Slavia Třebíč 3:2 (9:2, 4:6, 2:4, 3:1, 2:1)
- HC Dukla Jihlava – HC Hradec Králové 3:0 (2:0, 5:1, 5:4 SN)
- HC Slovan Ústí nad Labem – HC Olomouc 3:2 (7:2, 1:2, 3:6, 4:1, 3:0)

=== Semifinals ===
- KLH Chomutov – HC Dukla Jihlava 1:3 (1:2, 1:4, 3:2 SN, 1:7)
- HC Beroun – HC Slovan Ústí nad Labem 3:0 (1:0 SN, 4:0, 4:3)

=== Final ===
- HC Beroun – HC Dukla Jihlava 2:3 (0:1, 5:2, 1:4, 5:2, 1:4)

== Qualification ==
	Club	GP	W	OTW	T	OTL	L	GF	GA	Pts
1.	HC Slezan Opava	46	11	3	8	5	19	111	143	52
2.	IHC Písek	46	14	2	4	2	24	111	141	52
3.	HC Prostějov	46	14	1	3	3	25	107	140	50
4.	HC Kometa Brno	46	11	0	2	0	33	93	175	35

== Relegation ==
	Club	GP	W	OTW	T	OTL	L	GF	GA	Pts
1.	HC Kometa Brno	7	5	0	0	1	1	23	16	16
2.	HC Sareza Ostrava	7	4	1	1	0	1	23	14	15
3.	TJ Slovan Jindřichův Hradec	7	3	0	1	0	3	13	16	10
4.	HC Baník Most	8	2	0	3	0	3	17	18	9
5.	HC Prostějov	7	0	0	1	0	6	13	25	1
