= 2004–05 Czech 1. Liga season =

The 2004–05 Czech 1.liga season was the 12th season of the Czech 1.liga, the second level of ice hockey in the Czech Republic. Fourteen teams participated in the league, and HC Ceske Budejovice won the championship.

== Regular season ==
	Club	GP	W	OTW	T	OTL	L	Goals	Pts
1.	HC České Budějovice	52	44	0	1	1	6	226:79	134
2.	HC Slovan Ústí nad Labem	52	38	1	3	2	8	182:82	121
3.	HC Hradec Králové	52	25	2	4	5	16	161:146	88
4.	BK Mladá Boleslav	52	22	5	8	3	14	156:128	87
5.	HC Berounští Medvědi	52	25	2	4	2	19	121:101	85
6.	KLH Chomutov	52	23	1	7	4	17	184:146	82
7.	HC Kometa Brno	52	23	3	1	0	25	141:135	76
8.	HC Sareza Ostrava	52	21	2	3	1	25	145:159	71
9.	SK Kadaň	52	15	5	6	3	23	130:151	64
10.	HC Havířov	52	14	7	2	2	27	123:151	60
11.	HC Olomouc	52	17	1	4	0	30	120:171	57
12.	SK Horácká Slavia Třebíč	52	14	1	2	6	29	109:169	52
13.	HC Slezan Opava	52	13	2	2	5	30	105:177	50
14.	IHC Písek	52	10	3	3	1	35	108:193	40

== Playoffs ==
=== Quarterfinals ===
- HC České Budějovice – HC Sareza Ostrava 3:0 (6:0, 4:0, 3:2)
- HC Slovan Ústí nad Labem – HC Kometa Brno 3:0 (3:1, 6:2, 4:2)
- HC Hradec Králové – KLH Chomutov 2:3 (4:2, 3:2 P, 3:4 P, 1:4, 3:5)
- BK Mladá Boleslav – HC Beroun 3:0 (3:2, 2:0, 4:2)

=== Semifinals ===
- HC České Budějovice – KLH Chomutov 3:2 (2:1 SN, 2:3, 2:3 P, 3:2 P, 3:2 P)
- HC Slovan Ústí nad Labem – BK Mladá Boleslav 3:1 (3:2, 5:1, 1:2, 5:2)

=== Finals ===
- HC České Budějovice – HC Slovan Ústí nad Labem 3:0 (2:1, 3:0, 3:0)

== Relegation ==
	Club	GP	W	OTW	T	OTL	L	GF	GA	Pts
1.	TJ Slovan Jindřichův Hradec	7	5	1	0	0	1	20	11	17
2.	HC Prostějov	8	5	1	0	0	2	16	11	17
3.	HC Havlíčkův Brod	7	4	0	0	0	3	16	12	12
4.	IHC Písek	7	2	0	0	2	3	13	18	8
5.	HC Slezan Opava	7	0	0	0	0	7	11	24	0
