= 1993–94 Czech 1. Liga season =

1993–94 Czech 1. Liga
- League: Czech 1. Liga
- Sport: Ice hockey
- Duration: September 1993 – April 1994
- Number of teams: 14

Regular season
- Season champions: HC Zbrojovka Vsetín
- Top scorer: Radim Raděvič (HC Zbrojovka Vsetín)

Playoffs

Finals
- Champions: HC Zbrojovka Vsetín and HC Slavia Praha.
- Runners-up: HC Kometa Brno and HC Slovan Ústí nad Labem.

Czech 1. Liga seasons
- 1994-95 →

The 1993–94 Czech 1.liga season was the first season of the Czech 1.liga, the second level of ice hockey in the Czech Republic. Fourteen teams participated in the league, and HC Zbrojovka Vsetín and HC Slavia Praha were promoted to the Czech Extraliga.

== Regular season ==
	Club	GP	W	T	L	Goals	Pts
1.	HC Zbrojovka Vsetín	40	33	4	3	188:61	70
2.	HC Slavia Praha	40	24	7	9	176:107	55
3.	HC Královopolská Brno	40	23	7	10	182:129	53
4.	HC Slezan Opava	40	24	5	11	139:117	53
5.	HC Slovan Ústí nad Labem	40	18	9	13	121:105	45
6.	TŽ Třinec	40	16	5	19	132:134	37
7.	AZ Havířov	40	14	8	18	138:131	36
8.	HC Prostějov	40	13	9	18	113:145	35
9.	BK Havlíčkův Brod	40	13	7	20	128:172	33
10.	HC Baník Sokolov	40	13	5	22	117:159	31
11.	H + S Beroun HC	40	11	9	20	97:140	31
12.	HC Baník Hodonín	40	12	6	22	113:133	30
13.	HC Přerov	40	12	3	25	95:164	27
14.	VTJ Tábor	40	6	12	22	107:149	24

== Playoffs ==
=== Playoff qualification ===
- HC Slovan Ústí nad Labem - HC Baník Hodonín 2:0 (5:1, 6:0)
- TŽ Třinec - H + S Beroun HC 2:0 (4:2, 5:2)
- AZ Havířov - HC Baník Sokolov 2:1 (4:7, 6:2, 3:2)
- HC Prostějov - BK Havlíčkův Brod 0:2 (1:7, 4:6)

=== Quarterfinals ===
- HC Zbrojovka Vsetín - BK Havlíčkův Brod 3:0 (7:1, 8:0, 9:2)
- HC Slavia Praha - AZ Havířov 3:1 (8:3, 3:4, 4:3, 4:2)
- HC Královopolská Brno - TŽ Třinec 3:0 (3:0, 5:3, 4:2)
- HC Slezan Opava - HC Slovan Ústí nad Labem 1:3 (5:0, 1:2, 1:4, 1:5)

=== Semifinals ===
- HC Zbrojovka Vsetín - HC Slovan Ústí nad Labem 3:0 (6:0, 3:0, 3:2 SO)
- HC Slavia Praha - HC Královopolská Brno 3:0 (3:2 SO, 3:0, 6:3)

HC Slavia Praha and HC Zbrojovka Vsetín advance to the Czech Extraliga qualification.

== 1993-94 Czech Extraliga qualification ==
	Club	GP	W	T	L	Goals	Pts
1.	HC Zbrojovka Vsetín	6	4	2	0	29:13	10
2.	HC Slavia Praha	6	3	1	2	21:21	7
3.	HC Stadion Hradec Králové	6	1	2	3	17:21	4
4.	HC Vajgar Jindřichův Hradec	6	1	1	4	17:21	3

HC Slavia Praha and HC Zbrojovka Vsetín have been promoted to the Czech Extraliga. HC Stadion Hradec Králové and HC Vajgar Jindřichův Hradec have been relegated.

== Qualification for relegation ==
- HC Přerov – VTJ Tábor 1:3 (1:2, 1:5, 3:2, 0:1)

HC Přerov has been relegated to the Czech 2. liga.

== Relegation ==
=== 1st round ===
- HC Milevsko – VTJ Jitex Písek 1:0, 2:6

VTJ Jitex Písek has been promoted, Milevsko advances to the second round.

=== 2nd round ===
- VTJ Tábor – HC Milevsko 2:1 (6:1, 2:3, 3:1)

VTJ Tábor has qualified for the 1994-95 Czech 1.Liga season.
