= 2005–06 Czech 1. Liga season =

The 2005–06 Czech 1.liga season was the 13th season of the Czech 1.liga, the second level of ice hockey in the Czech Republic. 14 teams participated in the league, and HC Slovan Usti nad Labem won the championship.

== Regular season ==
	Club	GP	W	OTW	T	OTL	L	Goals	Pts
1.	HC Slovan Ústí nad Labem	52	31	3	6	1	11	167:94	106
2.	HC Dukla Jihlava	52	27	3	4	2	16	149:117	93
3.	BK Mladá Boleslav	52	28	0	7	1	18	148:109	92
4.	HC Kometa Brno	52	27	2	5	0	18	135:120	90
5.	HC Havířov	52	28	1	1	1	21	145:137	88
6.	KLH Chomutov	52	25	2	4	3	18	154:120	86
7.	HC Hradec Králové	52	25	3	3	1	20	144:121	85
8.	HC Olomouc	52	23	1	3	4	21	123:130	78
9.	HC Sareza Ostrava	52	17	4	5	2	24	117:140	66
10.	HC Berounští Medvědi	52	17	1	6	6	22	104:134	65
11.	SK Horácká Slavia Třebíč	52	17	2	6	3	24	118:125	64
12.	SK Kadaň	52	15	3	8	2	24	89:121	61
13.	HC Prostějov	52	12	3	3	0	34	120:185	45
14.	TJ Slovan Jindřichův Hradec	52	9	2	5	4	32	92:152	40

== Playoffs ==
=== Quarterfinals ===
- HC Slovan Ústí nad Labem – HC Olomouc 4:0 (4:1, 8:2, 3:1, 3:1)
- HC Dukla Jihlava – HC Hradec Králové 2:4 (5:4 SN, 2:4, 3:2, 2:3, 4:5 P, 0:4)
- BK Mladá Boleslav – KLH Chomutov 4:0 (3:0, 1:0, 3:2 SN, 2:1)
- HC Kometa Brno – HC Havířov 1:4 (4:3, 1:3, 2:3, 0:3, 0:1)

=== Semifinals ===
- HC Slovan Ústí nad Labem – HC Hradec Králové 3:0 (4:1, 1:0, 4:1)
- BK Mladá Boleslav – HC Havířov 3:0 (3:1, 7:3, 2:1)

=== Final ===
- HC Slovan Ústí nad Labem – BK Mladá Boleslav 3:1 (0:6, 3:1, 2:0, 4:2)

== Relegation ==
	Club	GP	W	OTW	T	OTL	L	GF	GA	Pts
1.	HC Prostějov	8	5	0	0	1	2	28	20	16
2.	HC Havlíčkův Brod	8	4	1	0	1	2	25	19	15
3.	VSK Technika Brno	8	3	1	0	0	4	20	22	11
4.	TJ Slovan Jindřichův Hradec	8	3	0	0	1	4	20	19	10
5.	IHC Písek	8	2	1	0	0	5	16	29	8
