= 2010–11 Czech 1. Liga season =

The 2010–11 Czech 1.liga season was the 18th season of the Czech 1.liga, the second level of ice hockey in the Czech Republic. 16 teams participated in the league, and HC Slovan Ústečtí Lvi won the championship.

== First round ==
| Pl. | Team | GP | W | OTW | OTL | L | Goals | Pts |
|---|---|---|---|---|---|---|---|---|
| 1. | KLH Chomutov | 30 | 16 | 4 | 7 | 3 | 99:68 | 63 |
| 2. | HC Slovan Ústečtí Lvi | 30 | 14 | 8 | 4 | 4 | 104:62 | 62 |
| 3. | HC Dukla Jihlava | 30 | 16 | 3 | 2 | 9 | 84:65 | 56 |
| 4. | HC VCES Hradec Králové | 30 | 15 | 2 | 3 | 10 | 94:93 | 52 |
| 5. | HC Olomouc | 30 | 14 | 3 | 2 | 11 | 77:68 | 50 |
| 6. | HC Berounští Medvědi | 30 | 13 | 4 | 2 | 11 | 68:74 | 49 |
| 7. | HC Rebel Havlíčkův Brod | 30 | 12 | 2 | 5 | 11 | 104:99 | 45 |
| 8. | Orli Znojmo | 30 | 12 | 3 | 3 | 12 | 79:83 | 45 |
| 9. | HC Vrchlabí | 30 | 11 | 1 | 6 | 12 | 69:81 | 41 |
| 10. | SK Kadaň | 30 | 12 | 2 | 1 | 15 | 86:72 | 41 |
| 11. | SK Horácká Slavia Třebíč | 30 | 10 | 3 | 5 | 12 | 78:85 | 41 |
| 12. | HC Benátky nad Jizerou | 30 | 10 | 4 | 2 | 14 | 81:87 | 40 |
| 13. | HC Tábor | 30 | 9 | 4 | 4 | 13 | 73:90 | 39 |
| 14. | HC Chrudim | 30 | 7 | 3 | 6 | 14 | 86:104 | 33 |
| 15. | HC Stadion Litoměřice | 30 | 6 | 6 | 3 | 15 | 67:100 | 33 |
| 16. | IHC Komterm Písek | 30 | 7 | 4 | 1 | 18 | 65:83 | 30 |

== Second round ==
=== Group A ===
| Pl. | Team | GP | W | OTW | OTL | L | Goals | Pts |
|---|---|---|---|---|---|---|---|---|
| 1. | HC Slovan Ústečtí Lvi | 44 | 23 | 9 | 5 | 7 | 160:94 | 92 |
| 2. | KLH Chomutov | 44 | 24 | 5 | 8 | 7 | 151:113 | 90 |
| 3. | HC Dukla Jihlava | 44 | 22 | 5 | 3 | 14 | 129:100 | 79 |
| 4. | HC Olomouc | 44 | 20 | 5 | 5 | 14 | 122:103 | 75 |
| 5. | HC Rebel Havlíčkův Brod | 44 | 18 | 3 | 7 | 16 | 155:147 | 67 |
| 6. | Orli Znojmo | 44 | 17 | 6 | 3 | 18 | 124:142 | 66 |
| 7. | HC VCES Hradec Králové | 44 | 17 | 4 | 5 | 18 | 130:150 | 64 |
| 8. | HC Berounští Medvědi | 44 | 14 | 5 | 5 | 20 | 96:121 | 57 |

=== Group B ===
| Pl. | Team | GP | W | OTW | OTL | L | Goals | Pts |
|---|---|---|---|---|---|---|---|---|
| 1. | HC Vrchlabí | 44 | 16 | 4 | 8 | 16 | 111:119 | 64 |
| 2. | SK Horácká Slavia Třebíč | 44 | 16 | 5 | 6 | 17 | 123:123 | 64 |
| 3. | HC Benátky nad Jizerou | 44 | 15 | 5 | 7 | 17 | 121:124 | 62 |
| 4. | SK Kadaň | 44 | 17 | 3 | 3 | 21 | 127:113 | 60 |
| 5. | HC Stadion Litoměřice | 44 | 12 | 9 | 5 | 18 | 114:136 | 59 |
| 6. | HC Tábor | 44 | 12 | 7 | 6 | 19 | 108:134 | 56 |
| 7. | HC Chrudim | 44 | 13 | 5 | 6 | 20 | 121:143 | 55 |
| 8. | IHC Komterm Písek | 44 | 12 | 4 | 2 | 26 | 94:124 | 46 |

== Pre-Playoffs ==
HC Rebel Havlíčkův Brod – SK Kadaň

- HC Rebel Havlíčkův Brod - SK Kadaň 4:3 OT (0:0, 2:1, 1:2, 1:0)
- HC Rebel Havlíčkův Brod - SK Kadaň 4:2 (1:0, 3:0, 0:2)
- SK Kadaň - HC Rebel Havlíčkův Brod 4:3 OT (0:0, 2:1, 1:2, 1:0)
- SK Kadaň - HC Rebel Havlíčkův Brod 3:6 (1:1, 0:2, 2:3)

HC Rebel Havlíčkův Brod qualified for the playoffs.

Orli Znojmo – HC Benátky nad Jizerou

- Orli Znojmo - HC Benátky nad Jizerou 1:3 (1:2, 0:1, 0:0)
- Orli Znojmo - HC Benátky nad Jizerou 2:1 OT (0:0, 1:1, 0:0, 1:0)
- HC Benátky nad Jizerou - Orli Znojmo 7:1 (3:1, 3:0, 1:0)
- HC Benátky nad Jizerou - Orli Znojmo 1:2 (0:1, 0:1 1:0)
- Orli Znojmo - HC Benátky nad Jizerou 5:1 (2:0, 1:0 2:1)

Orli Znojmo qualified for the playoffs

HC Berounští Medvědi – HC Vrchlabí

- HC Berounští Medvědi - HC Vrchlabí 0:4 (0:1, 0:1, 0:2)
- HC Berounští Medvědi - HC Vrchlabí 3:2 (1:0, 1:1, 1:1)
- HC Vrchlabí - HC Berounští Medvědi 3:0 (1:0, 1:0, 1:0)
- HC Vrchlabí - HC Berounští Medvědi 3:0 (1:0, 0:0, 2:0)

HC Vrchlabí qualified for the playoffs.

HC VCES Hradec Králové – SK Horácká Slavia Třebíč

- HC VCES Hradec Králové - SK Horácká Slavia Třebíč 3:1 (1:1, 1:0, 1:0)
- HC VCES Hradec Králové - SK Horácká Slavia Třebíč 5:2 (0:0, 2:2, 3:0)
- SK Horácká Slavia Třebíč - HC VCES Hradec Králové 4:1 (2:0, 0:1, 2:0)
- SK Horácká Slavia Třebíč - HC VCES Hradec Králové 2:4 (0:2, 1:1, 1:1)

HC VCES Hradec Králové qualified for the playoffs.

== Playoffs ==
Quarter-finals
HC Slovan Ústečtí Lvi | 4
HC Vrchlabí | 2
HC Olomouc | 2
HC Rebel Havl. Brod | 4
HC Dukla Jihlava | 4
Orli Znojmo | 2
KLH Chomutov | 4
HC VCES Hr. Králové | 1

Semi-finals
HC Slovan Ústečtí Lvi | 4
HC Rebel Havl. Brod | 0
HC Dukla Jihlava | 0
KLH Chomutov | 4

Final
HC Slovan Ústečtí Lvi | 4
KLH Chomutov | 0

== Relegation ==
| Pl. | Team | GP | W | OTW | OTL | L | Goals | Pts |
|---|---|---|---|---|---|---|---|---|
| 1 | Salith Šumperk | 8 | 6 | 1 | 0 | 1 | 42:31 | 20 |
| 2 | HC Most | 8 | 5 | 0 | 1 | 2 | 42:34 | 16 |
| 3 | HC Chrudim | 8 | 3 | 0 | 2 | 3 | 30:32 | 11 |
| 4 | KLH Vajgar Jindřichův Hradec | 8 | 2 | 1 | 0 | 5 | 28:37 | 8 |
| 5 | IHC KOMTERM Písek | 8 | 1 | 1 | 0 | 6 | 21:29 | 5 |
