= 1995–96 Czech 1. Liga season =

The 1995–96 Czech 1.liga season was the third season of the Czech 1.liga, the second level of ice hockey in the Czech Republic. 14 teams participated in the league, and HC Slezan Opava and HC Prerov were promoted to the Czech Extraliga.

== Regular season ==
	Club	GP	W	T	L	Goals	Pts
1.	HC Slezan Opava	40	22	11	7	139:82	55
2.	HC Přerov	40	24	5	11	135:94	53
3.	HC Becherovka Karlovy Vary	40	21	11	8	149:99	53
4.	HC Femax Havířov	40	23	3	14	143:124	49
5.	IHC Písek	40	17	8	15	143:108	42
6.	H + S Beroun HC	40	18	5	17	109:112	41
7.	TJ Slovan Jindřichův Hradec	40	15	10	15	129:118	40
8.	HC Slovan Ústí nad Labem	40	14	10	16	115:125	38
9.	HK Kralupy nad Vltavou	40	14	8	18	115:135	36
10.	HC Prostějov	40	14	7	19	114:118	35
11.	HC Baník Sokolov	40	13	8	19	110:145	34
12.	BK Havlíčkův Brod	40	12	11	17	112:129	33
13.	HC Liberec	40	9	9	22	108:125	27
14.	HC Lev Hradec Králové	40	8	6	26	94:165	22

== Playoffs ==
=== 1/8 Final ===
- IHC Písek – BK Havlíčkův Brod 2:1 (3:6, 4:0, 5:2)
- H + S Beroun HC – HC Baník Sokolov 2:1 (2:4, 5:1, 6:3)
- TJ Slovan Jindřichův Hradec – HC Prostějov 1:2 (3:6, 2:1 n.V., 2:3 n.V.)
- HC Slovan Ústí nad Labem – HC Kralupy nad Vltavou 1:2 (1:2, 5:3, 3:7)

=== Quarterfinals ===
- HC Slezan Opava – HC Prostějov 2:0 (3:0, 2:0)
- HC Přerov – HC Kralupy nad Vltavou 2:0 (4:3 P, 11:1)
- HC Becherovka Karlovy Vary – H + S Beroun HC 2:0 (3:1, 5:1)
- HC Femax Havířov – IHC Písek 1:2 (1:2 SN, 7:3, 3:9)

=== Semifinals ===
- HC Slezan Opava – IHC Písek 2:0 (4:3, 4:1)
- HC Přerov – HC Becherovka Karlovy Vary 2:1 (1:4, 6:3, 4:0)

== Relegation ==
	Club	GP	W	T	L	GF	GA	Pts
1.	HC Karviná	10	6	1	3	39	29	13
2.	HC Liberec	10	6	1	3	44	24	13
3.	HC Příbram	10	5	2	3	35	31	12
4.	SK Horácká Slavia Třebíč	10	5	1	4	57	26	11
5.	HC Milevsko	10	3	1	6	18	49	7
6.	HC Lev Hradec Králové	10	2	0	8	33	47	4
