= Roman Turek =

Czech ice hockey player

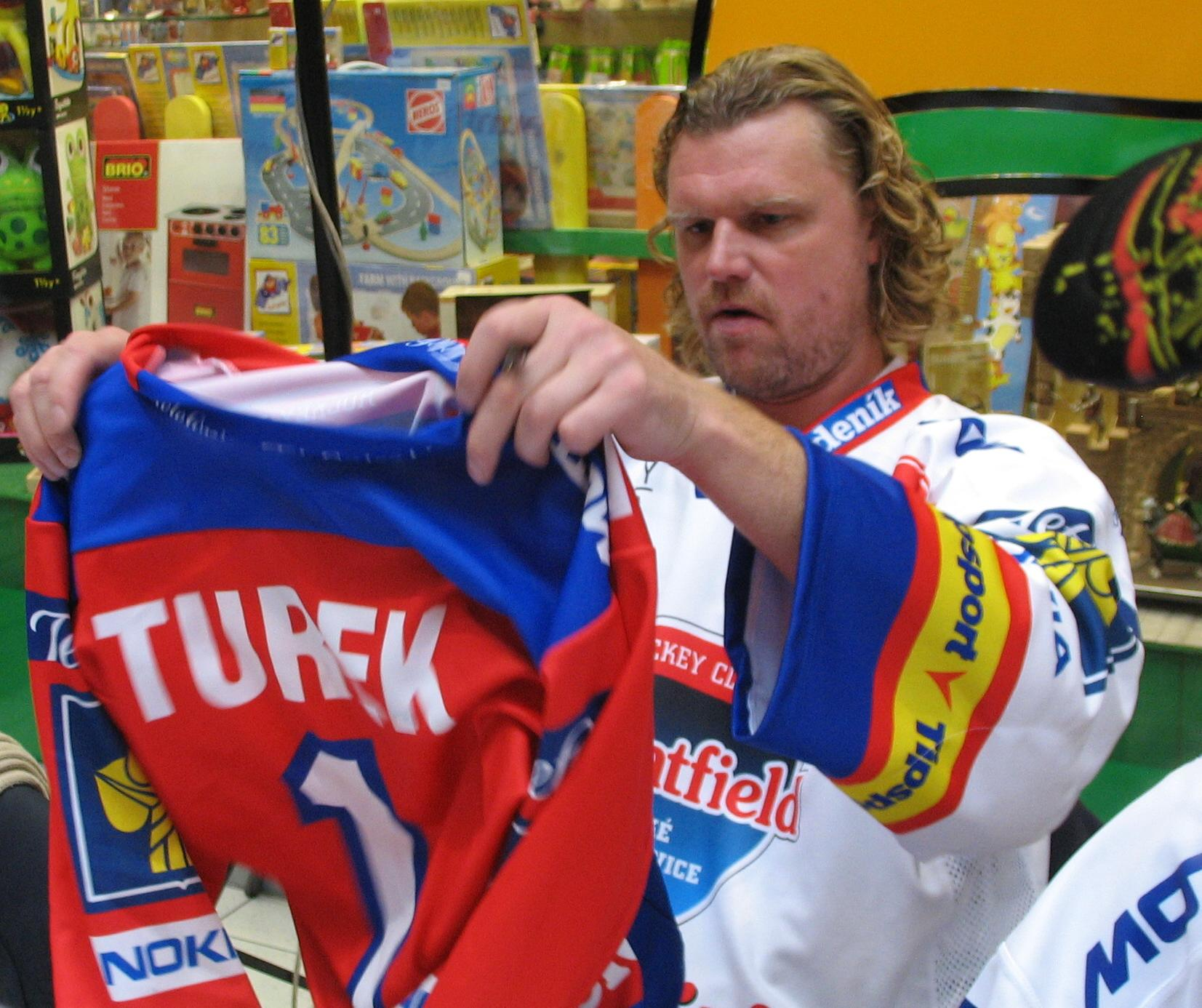
- Turek with HC Mountfield in 2007
- Born: May 21, 1970 (age 56) Strakonice, Czechoslovakia
- Height: 6 ft 4 in (193 cm)
- Weight: 220 lb (100 kg; 15 st 10 lb)
- Position: Goaltender
- Caught: Right
- Played for: HC České Budějovice; Nürnberg Ice Tigers; Dallas Stars; St. Louis Blues; Calgary Flames
- National team: Czechoslovakia and Czech Republic
- NHL draft: 113th overall, 1990; Minnesota North Stars
- Playing career: 1988–2010
Medal record
Representing Czechoslovakia
European Junior Championships
Gold medal – first place	1988 Czechoslovakia
World Junior Championships
Bronze medal – third place	1989 United States
Bronze medal – third place	1990 Finland
Representing Czech Republic
World Championships
Gold medal – first place	1996 Austria

Roman Turek (born May 21, 1970) is a Czech former professional ice hockey goaltender who played for the Dallas Stars, St. Louis Blues and Calgary Flames in a nine-year National Hockey League (NHL) career. He last played in the Czech Extraliga for HC České Budějovice.

== Playing career ==
=== Dallas Stars ===
Drafted 113th overall by the Minnesota North Stars in the 1990 NHL entry draft on June 16, 1990, Turek moved with the franchise to Dallas, where he initially played as the third-string goaltender behind Andy Moog and Artūrs Irbe before serving as the backup to Ed Belfour. He won a Stanley Cup in this role in 1999. Despite his backup role, he achieved international glory with the Czech Republic national team, backstopping them to a gold medal at the 1996 World Championships. In this year, he also played in Germany for the Nürnberg Ice Tigers.

=== St. Louis Blues ===
The Stars, fearing they would lose Turek to the Atlanta Thrashers in the upcoming expansion draft, traded him to the St. Louis Blues in the 1999 off-season on June 19, 1999, hours after winning the Stanley Cup Final. Turek finally got his chance to shine as he topped the league with seven shutouts and won the William M. Jennings Trophy in his first season. He helped the Blues to the Presidents' Trophy that year and the Blues entered the playoffs with high expectations. However, St. Louis was eliminated in seven games by the eighth-seeded San Jose Sharks, with some aggravated Blues fans pinning responsibility on Turek because of some soft goals he allowed, including one in game seven that was fired from centre ice by Sharks captain Owen Nolan. However, he played a second season with the Blues while being challenged for the starting position by backup Brent Johnson. He put up good numbers again, this time helping the Blues reach the playoffs as the fourth seed, where they again faced the Sharks in the first round. This time, Turek helped the Blues eliminate the Sharks in six games and then helped them sweep the Dallas Stars, his former team, in the second round. However, in the third round against the Colorado Avalanche, soft goals plagued him again (including one scored after an attempt to scoop the puck into his glove with his stick) and again in some fan circles bore the brunt of the blame for the Blues' third round 4–1 ouster.

=== Calgary Flames ===
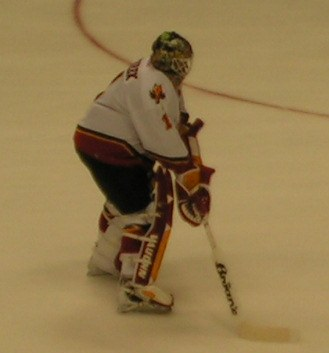
Turek with the Calgary Flames in 2004

In the off-season, Turek was traded to the Calgary Flames on June 23, 2001.

In the 2003–04 season, Turek's status as the Flames' starting goaltender was altered drastically when, following an injury to Turek, Darryl Sutter traded a conditional draft pick to the San Jose Sharks for Miikka Kiprusoff. Though he struggled in San Jose, Kiprusoff's stellar performances in Calgary relegated Turek to the bench. However, Turek was a dependable backup, as Kiprusoff led the Flames to the 2004 Stanley Cup Final against the Tampa Bay Lightning.

In 2004, Turek restructured his contract to substantially drop his salary from $5 million plus bonuses for the 2004–05 and 2005–06 seasons. The restructuring brought his salary to between $1 million and $2 million, with potential earnings relying heavily on performance bonuses. The restructuring saved the Calgary Flames organization between $3 million and $4 million in the 2004–05 season.

Turek announced his retirement from the NHL on August 9, 2005.

== Mask design ==
- Turek's masks all featured Iron Maiden mascot "Eddie". The artwork was done by Ray Bishop of Bishop Custom Designs.

== International play ==
- 1994 Played for Czech Republic at 1994 Winter Olympics
- 1994 Played for Czech Republic at World Championships
- 1996 Won gold medal for Czech Republic at World Championships
- 1996 Played for Czech Republic at World Cup of Hockey

== Career statistics ==
=== Regular season and playoffs ===
			Regular season										Playoffs
Season	Team	League	GP	W	L	T	OTL	MIN	GA	SO	GAA	SV%	GP	W	L	MIN	GA	SO	GAA	SV%
1987–88	TJ Motor České Budějovice	CSSR-JR	—	—	—	—	—	—	—	—	—	—	—	—	—	—	—	—	—	—
1988–89	VTJ Písek	CSSR-2	—	—	—	—	—	—	—	—	—	—	—	—	—	—	—	—	—	—
1989–90	VTJ Písek	CSSR-2	—	—	—	—	—	—	—	—	—	—	—	—	—	—	—	—	—	—
1990–91	TJ Motor České Budějovice	CSSR	26	—	—	—	—	1244	98	0	4.73	.880	—	—	—	—	—	—	—	—
1991–92	TJ Motor České Budějovice	CSSR-2	—	—	—	—	—	—	—	—	—	—	—	—	—	—	—	—	—	—
1992–93	HC České Budějovice	CSSR	43	—	—	—	—	2555	121	—	2.84	.923	—	—	—	—	—	—	—	—
1993–94	HC České Budějovice	CZE	44	23	15	6	—	2532	109	3	2.58	.927	3	0	3	180	11	0	3.67	.866
1994–95	HC České Budějovice	CZE	44	20	18	6	—	2586	118	2	2.74	.920	9	5	4	501	26	0	3.11	.915
1995–96	Nürnberg Ice Tigers	DEL	48	—	—	—	—	2787	154	—	3.32	—	5	—	—	338	14	—	2.48	—
1996–97	Dallas Stars	NHL	6	3	1	0	—	263	9	0	2.06	.930	—	—	—	—	—	—	—	—
1996–97	Michigan K-Wings	IHL	29	8	13	4	—	1555	77	0	2.97	.905	—	—	—	—	—	—	—	—
1997–98	Dallas Stars	NHL	23	11	10	1	—	1324	49	1	2.22	.901	—	—	—	—	—	—	—	—
1997–98	Michigan K-Wings	IHL	2	1	1	0	—	119	5	0	2.52	.928	—	—	—	—	—	—	—	—
1998–99	Dallas Stars	NHL	26	16	3	3	—	1382	48	1	2.08	.915	—	—	—	—	—	—	—	—
1999–00	St. Louis Blues	NHL	67	42	15	9	—	3960	129	7	1.95	.912	7	3	4	415	19	0	2.75	.882
2000–01	St. Louis Blues	NHL	54	24	18	10	—	3232	123	6	2.28	.901	14	9	5	908	31	0	2.05	.919
2001–02	Calgary Flames	NHL	69	30	28	11	—	4081	172	5	2.53	.906	—	—	—	—	—	—	—	—
2002–03	Calgary Flames	NHL	65	27	29	9	—	3822	164	4	2.57	.902	—	—	—	—	—	—	—	—
2003–04	Calgary Flames	NHL	18	6	11	0	—	1031	40	3	2.33	.914	1	0	0	19	0	0	0.00	1.000
2004–05	HC České Budějovice	CZE-2	15	13	2	0	—	859	23	3	1.61	.924	6	6	0	360	3	4	0.50	.979
2005–06	HC České Budějovice	CZE	31	15	11	5	—	1832	69	1	2.26	.924	10	5	5	618	19	1	1.84	.941
2006–07	HC Mountfield	CZE	35	19	16	—	0	1995	88	2	2.65	.911	11	5	6	609	29	1	2.86	.914
2007–08	HC Mountfield	CZE	42	29	13	—	0	2494	89	6	2.14	.929	11	7	4	641	17	3	1.59	.945
2008–09	HC Mountfield	CZE	44	20	24	—	0	2463	104	4	2.53	.921	—	—	—	—	—	—	—	—
2009–10	HC Mountfield	CZE	38	14	24	—	0	2286	109	4	2.86	.906	5	2	3	298	22	0	4.43	.872
CZE totals			278	140	121	17	0	16,188	686	22	2.54	.920	49	24	25	2,847	124	5	2.61	.919
NHL totals			328	159	115	43	—	19,094	734	27	2.31	.907	22	12	9	1,343	50	0	2.23	.908

=== International ===
Year	Team	Event	GP	W	L	T	MIN	GA	SO	GAA	SV%
1988	Czechoslovakia	EJC	5	—	—	—	273	9	—	1.98	—
1989	Czechoslovakia	WJC	7	4	1	1	390	16	0	2.46	—
1990	Czechoslovakia	WJC	6	4	2	0	326	14	0	2.58	.906
1994	Czech Republic	OLY	2	2	0	0	120	3	0	1.50	.931
1994	Czech Republic	WC	2	—	—	—	120	4	0	2.00	.892
1995	Czech Republic	WC	6	3	3	0	359	9	2	1.50	.939
1996	Czech Republic	WC	8	7	0	1	480	15	1	1.88	.952
1996	Czech Republic	WCH	3	0	3	0	82	10	0	7.32	.833
Junior totals			18	—	—	—	989	39	—	2.37	—
Senior totals			21	—	—	—	1161	41	3	2.12	—

== Awards and honours ==
Award	Year
NHL
William M. Jennings Trophy	1999 (shared with Ed Belfour), 2000
Stanley Cup champion	1999
All-Star Game	2000
Second All-Star team	2000
International
Best Goaltender	1996
All-Star team	1995, 1996

Awards
Preceded by Martin Brodeur	Winner of the William M. Jennings Trophy; 1999 (with Ed Belfour), 2000	Succeeded by Dominik Hašek
Preceded by Milos Holan	Golden Hockey Stick; 1994	Succeeded by Jaromir Jagr
