= 1996–97 Czech 1. Liga season =

The 1996–97 Czech 1.liga season was the fourth season of the Czech 1.liga, the second level of ice hockey in the Czech Republic. 14 teams participated in the league, and HC Becherovka Karlovy Vary and HC Kralupy nad Vltavou were promoted to the Czech Extraliga.

== Regular season ==
	Club	GP	W	T	L	Goals	Pts
1.	HC Becherovka Karlovy Vary	52	29	13	10	186:125	71
2.	HC Kralupy nad Vltavou	52	26	14	12	170:120	66
3.	IHC Písek	52	26	11	15	185:137	63
4.	HC Kometa Brno	52	23	11	18	165:146	57
5.	HC Berounští Medvědi	52	22	10	20	170:162	54
6.	HC Přerov	52	20	13	19	142:144	53
7.	BK Havlíčkův Brod	52	22	8	22	153:141	52
8.	TJ Slovan Jindřichův Hradec	52	22	7	23	142:163	51
9.	HC Liberec	52	18	14	20	144:155	51
10.	HC Femax Havířov	52	20	9	23	161:161	49
11.	HC Prostějov	52	17	12	23	165:176	46
12.	HC Slovan Ústí nad Labem	52	19	6	27	147:200	44
13.	SK Karviná	52	13	11	28	153:180	37
14.	HC Baník Sokolov	52	15	5	32	129:202	35

== Relegation ==
- SK Karviná – SK Horácká Slavia Třebíč 0:4 (2:3, 1:6, 2:4, 3:4)
- HC Baník Sokolov – SK Agropodnik Znojmo 0:4 (2:3 n.V., 0:1, 1:5, 1:4)
