= 2009–10 Czech 1. Liga season =

Czech ice hockey season

The 2009–10 Czech 1.liga season was the 17th season of the Czech 1.liga, the second level of ice hockey in the Czech Republic. 16 teams participated in the league, and KLH Chomutov won the championship.

== Regular season ==
	Club	GP	W	OTW	OTL	L	Goals	Pts
1.	HC Slovan Ústečtí Lvi	46	34	6	3	3	190:96	117
2.	KLH Chomutov	46	29	4	5	8	176:108	100
3.	HC Olomouc	46	22	6	3	15	141:113	81
4.	HC VCES Hradec Králové	46	20	6	6	14	142:121	78
5.	SK Horácká Slavia Třebíč	46	21	2	4	19	129:137	71
6.	HC Dukla Jihlava	46	19	4	4	19	130:124	69
7.	Orli Znojmo	46	19	3	5	19	135:132	68
8.	SK Kadaň	46	18	5	2	21	127:121	66
9.	HC Tábor	46	18	4	3	21	118:134	65
10.	HC Benátky nad Jizerou	46	16	6	4	20	123:128	64
11.	HC Rebel Havlíčkův Brod	46	15	7	4	20	129:140	63
12.	HC Vrchlabí	46	15	6	5	20	124:130	62
13.	HC Chrudim	46	15	3	8	20	125:147	59
14.	HC Berounští Medvědi	46	14	3	11	18	102:133	59
15.	Hokej Šumperk 2003	46	12	6	2	26	134:172	50
16.	HC Havířov	46	8	2	4	32	84:173	32

== Pre-Playoffs ==
- SK Horácká Slavia Třebíč – HC Vrchlabí 3:2 (4:2, 2:3 OT, 4:3, 0:1, 3:2 SO)
- HC Dukla Jihlava – HC Rebel Havlíčkův Brod 3:2 (3:2 OT, 2:3 SO, 3:2 SO, 2:4, 3:1)
- Orli Znojmo – HC Benátky nad Jizerou 3:1 (4:3 OT, 3:1, 2:3 OT, 6:4)
- SK Kadaň – HC Tábor 3:2 (4:2, 7:4, 1:3, 1:4, 5:2)

== Playoffs ==
=== Quarterfinals ===
- KLH Chomutov – Orli Znojmo 10:1 (4:1, 4:0, 2:0)
- KLH Chomutov – Orli Znojmo 7:1 (2:0, 2:0, 3:1)
- Orli Znojmo – KLH Chomutov 5:7 (2:1, 2:3, 1:3)
- Orli Znojmo – KLH Chomutov 1:3 (1:0, 0:0, 0:3)
- HC Slovan Ústečtí Lvi – Sportovní klub Kadaň 3:1 (0:0, 1:1, 2:0)
- HC Slovan Ústečtí Lvi – Sportovní klub Kadaň 4:0 (1:0, 2:0, 1:0)
- Sportovní klub Kadaň – HC Slovan Ústečtí Lvi 6:8 (2:2, 3:3, 1:3)
- Sportovní klub Kadaň – HC Slovan Ústečtí Lvi 1:6 (0:3, 1:1, 0:2)
- HC VCES Hradec Králové – SK Horácká Slavia Třebíč 1:4 (0:0, 0:4, 1:0)
- HC VCES Hradec Králové – SK Horácká Slavia Třebíč 3:2 (2:2, 1:0, 0:0)
- SK Horácká Slavia Třebíč – HC VCES Hradec Králové 10:4 (5:2, 4:1, 1:1)
- SK Horácká Slavia Třebíč – HC VCES Hradec Králové 0:3 (0:1, 0:2, 0:0)
- HC VCES Hradec Králové – SK Horácká Slavia Třebíč 6:3 (2:0, 2:2, 2:1)
- SK Horácká Slavia Třebíč – HC VCES Hradec Králové 1:6 (0:2, 0:1, 1:3)
- HC Olomouc – HC Dukla Jihlava 3:0 (0:0, 2:0, 1:0)
- HC Olomouc – HC Dukla Jihlava 5:4(PP) (1:0, 1:2, 2:2 – 1:0)
- HC Dukla Jihlava – HC Olomouc 2:3(PP) (1:0, 1:2, 0:0 – 0:1)
- HC Dukla Jihlava – HC Olomouc 5:4 (2:1, 3:1, 0:2)
- HC Olomouc – HC Dukla Jihlava 4:3(PP) (1:0, 2:2, 0:1 – 1:0)

=== Semifinal ===
- KLH Chomutov – HC Olomouc 3:1 (1:0, 1:0, 1:1)
- KLH Chomutov – HC Olomouc 4:2 (2:1, 1:0, 1:1)
- HC Olomouc – KLH Chomutov 3:4 SN (0:0, 0:2, 3:1)
- HC Olomouc – KLH Chomutov 2:1 (2:0, 0:0, 0:1)
- KLH Chomutov – HC Olomouc 3:0 (0:0, 1:0, 2:0)
- HC Slovan Ústečtí Lvi – HC VCES Hradec Králové 6:3 (2:0, 1:1, 3:2)
- HC Slovan Ústečtí Lvi – HC VCES Hradec Králové 9:1 (5:0, 4:0, 0:1)
- HC VCES Hradec Králové – HC Slovan Ústečtí Lvi 3:2 PP (0:0, 1:0, 1:2 – 1:0)
- HC VCES Hradec Králové – HC Slovan Ústečtí Lvi 6:1 (3:0, 1:0, 2:1)
- HC Slovan Ústečtí Lvi – HC VCES Hradec Králové 9:4 (2:1, 3:2, 4:1)
- HC VCES Hradec Králové – HC Slovan Ústečtí Lvi 1:5 (0:1, 1:3, 0:1)

=== Final ===
- HC Slovan Ústečtí Lvi – KLH Chomutov 2:1 (1:0, 1:1, 0:0)
- HC Slovan Ústečtí Lvi – KLH Chomutov 5:2 (2:0, 1:1, 2:1)
- KLH Chomutov – HC Slovan Ústečtí Lvi 4:3 PP (2:2, 1:1, 0:0 – 1:0)
- KLH Chomutov – HC Slovan Ústečtí Lvi 5:2 (2:1, 3:0, 0:1)
- HC Slovan Ústečtí Lvi – KLH Chomutov 4:2 (0:0, 2:1, 2:1)
- KLH Chomutov – HC Slovan Ústečtí Lvi 6:2 1:1, 3:0, 2:1
- HC Slovan Ústečtí Lvi – KLH Chomutov 1:2 1:1, 0:0, 0:1

== Qualification round ==
	Club	GP	W	OTW	OTL	L	Goals	Pts
1.	HC Chrudim	50	18	3	8	21	141:155	68
2.	HC Berounští Medvědi	50	16	3	12	19	108:140	66
3.	Hokej Šumperk 2003	50	12	7	2	29	144:189	52
