= 2007–08 Czech 1. Liga season =

The 2007–08 Czech 1.liga season was the 15th season of the Czech 1.liga, the second level of ice hockey in the Czech Republic. 16 teams participated in the league, and BK Mlada Boleslav won the championship.

== First round ==
=== Western Group ===
	Club	GP	W	OTW	OTL	L	Goals	Pts
1.	BK Mladá Boleslav	44	34	4	4	2	182:71	114
2.	KLH Chomutov	44	32	3	1	8	187:106	103
3.	HC Hradec Králové	44	23	4	8	9	150:114	85
4.	HC Vrchlabí	44	20	4	4	16	127:110	72
5.	SK Kadaň	44	13	4	8	19	99:128	55
6.	HC Rebel Havlíčkův Brod	44	14	5	1	24	105:140	53
7.	HC Berounští Medvědi	44	10	5	4	25	94:132	44
8.	HC Most	44	12	2	4	26	100:154	44

=== Eastern Group ===
	Club	GP	W	OTW	OTL	L	Goals	Pts
1.	HC Olomouc	44	24	6	2	12	150:107	86
2.	HC Kometa Brno	44	25	3	4	12	154:109	85
3.	HC Havířov	44	20	1	5	18	133:137	67
4.	HC Sareza Ostrava	44	16	3	8	17	137:131	62
5.	HC Dukla Jihlava	44	16	5	2	21	128:151	60
6.	SK Horácká Slavia Třebíč	44	14	3	3	24	96:137	51
7.	HK Jestřábi Prostějov	44	9	6	3	26	116:160	42
8.	Hokej Šumperk 2003	44	7	5	2	30	98:169	33

== Pre-Playoffs ==
- HC Hradec Králové – SK Horácká Slavia Třebíč 3:2 (2:3, 10:0, 1:3, 4:1, 7:2)
- HC Vrchlabí – HC Dukla Jihlava 3:2 (3:1, 4:3, 2:7, 1:2, 1:0)
- HC Havířov – HC Rebel Havlíčkův Brod 1:3 (2:3 n.V., 1:2 n.V., 2:1, 2:5)
- HC Sareza Ostrava – SK Kadaň 3:0 (3:1, 4:2, 4:0)

== Playoffs ==
=== Quarterfinals ===
- BK Mladá Boleslav – HC Rebel Havlíčkův Brod 4:0 (4:1, 6:5 P, 3:2 P, 4:3)
- HC Olomouc – HC Sareza Ostrava 4:1 (6:2, 7:3, 4:6, 3:2 P, 7:4)
- KLH Chomutov – HC Vrchlabí 4:1 (3:1, 4:1, 0:5, 4:2, 7:3)
- HC Kometa Brno – HC Hradec Králové 4:2 (2:1 P, 1:2, 3:1, 1:6, 6:5 P, 3:2)

=== Semifinals ===
- BK Mladá Boleslav – HC Kometa Brno 4:3 (4:2, 4:3, 0:4, 0:3, 6:3, 1:6, 2:1 P)
- HC Olomouc – KLH Chomutov 2:4 (5:2, 7:6 SN, 1:4, 0:2, 2:3, 0:7)

=== Finals ===
- BK Mladá Boleslav – KLH Chomutov 4:0 ( 2:1 SN, 4:1, 6:5 SN, 3:2 )

== Qualification round ==
	Club	GP	W	OTW	OTL	L	Goals	Pts
1.	HC Berounští Medvědi	56	19	6	4	27	133:148	73
2.	HC Most	56	18	2	4	32	142:184	62
3.	HK Jestřábi Prostějov	56	13	6	4	33	152:202	55
4.	Hokej Šumperk 2003	56	10	6	3	37	129:229	45
