= Pavel Maláč =

Czech ice hockey goaltender

- Born: June 16, 1973 (age 51); Orlová, Czechoslovakia
- Height: 6 ft 1 in (185 cm)
- Weight: 181 lb (82 kg; 12 st 13 lb)
- Position: Goaltender
- Caught: Left
- Played for: AC ZPS Zlín; ASD Dukla Jihlava; HC Oceláři Třinec; HC Havířov Panthers
- Playing career: 1990–2014

Pavel Maláč (born June 16, 1973) is a Czech former professional ice hockey goaltender.

Maláč played a total of 57 games in the Czechoslovak First Ice Hockey League and the Czech Extraliga for HC Zlín, ASD Dukla Jihlava, HC Oceláři Třinec and HC Havířov Panthers. He also played in the 1993 World Junior Ice Hockey Championships for the Czechs and Slovaks Republic, winning a bronze medal.

His son Filip Maláč is also a goaltender who plays for Dukla Jihlava.
