= Zimní stadion Havířov =

Indoor sporting arena in Havířov, Czech Republic

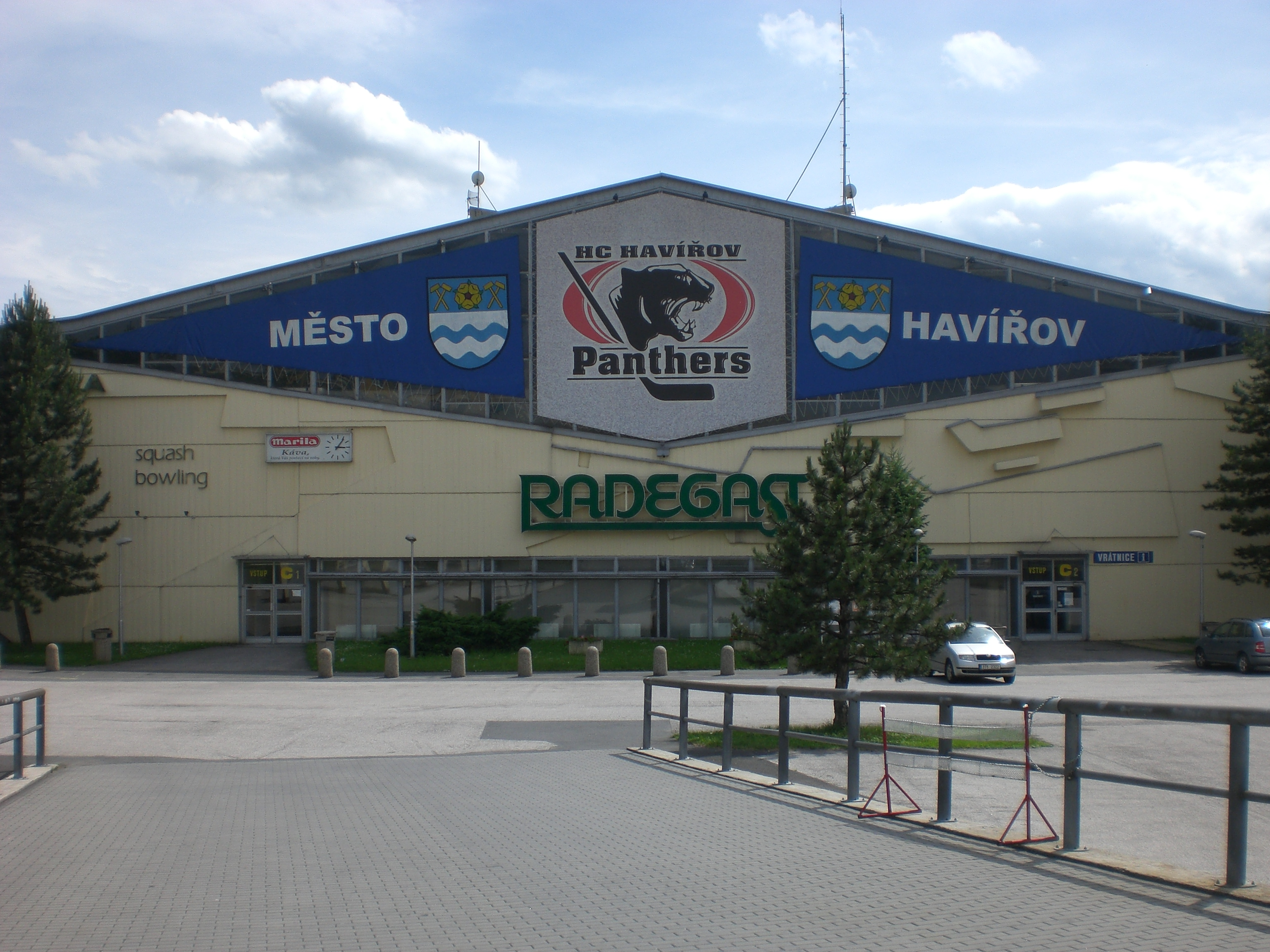
- Interactive map of Zimní stadion Havířov
- Location: Těšínská 2, Havířov, Czech Republic 736 01
- Coordinates: 49°46′11.343″N 18°26′43.342″E
- Operator: Správa sportovních a rekreačních zařízení
- Capacity: 5,100
- Field size: 58 m × 28.5 m (190 ft × 94 ft)

Construction
- Opened: 1968

Tenant
- AZ Havířov

Zimní stadion Havířov is a multi-use indoor sporting arena located in Havířov, Czech Republic. The capacity of the arena is 5,100 people, all places are seated. The arena was constructed in 1968. It is currently home to the AZ Havířov ice hockey team, and bears the name of a local company, GASCONTROL.
