= Zimní stadion Ústí nad Labem =

Indoor sporting arena in Ústí nad Labem, Czech Republic

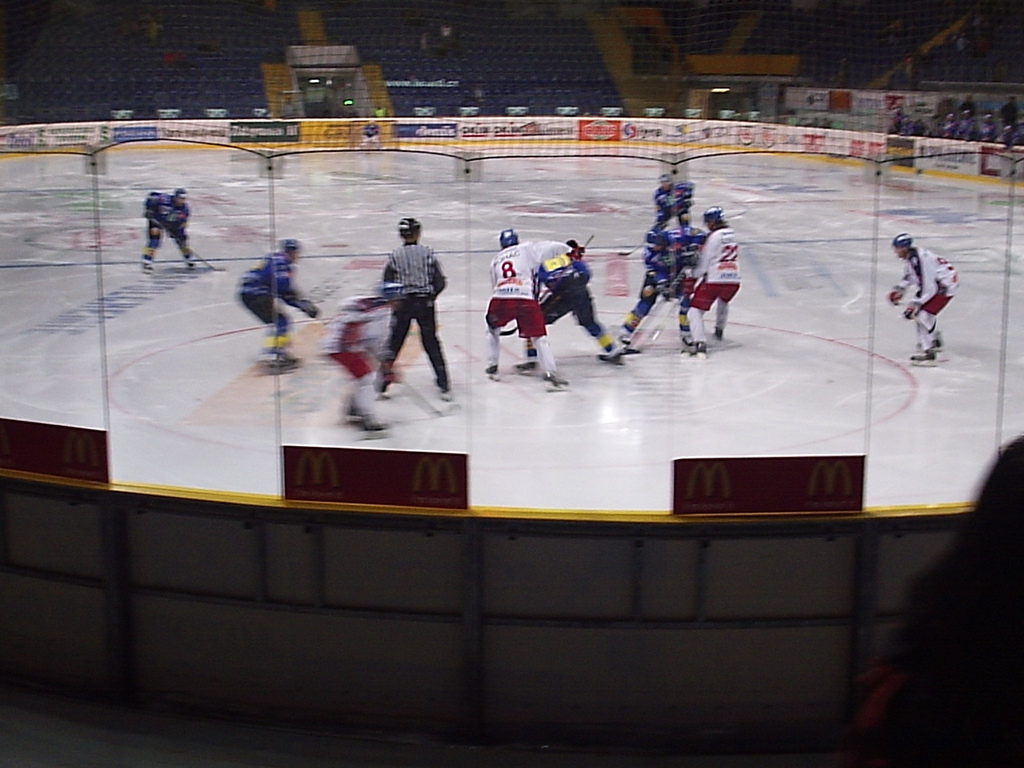
- Interactive map of Zimní stadion Ústí nad Labem
- Former names: Zlatopramen Arena
- Location: Masarykova 232, Ústí nad Labem, Czech Republic 400 01
- Coordinates: 50°40′39.32″N 14°0′49.18″E
- Operator: HC SLOVAN ÚSTÍ NAD LABEM spolek
- Capacity: 4,634
- Field size: 26 m × 59.5 m (85 ft × 195 ft)

Construction
- Opened: 7 November 1956
- Renovated: 1969–1971, 2004, 2010

Tenant
- HC Slovan Ústečtí Lvi

Zimní stadion Ústí nad Labem is an indoor sporting arena located in Ústí nad Labem, Czech Republic. The capacity of the arena is 6,500 people and was renovated in 2004. It is currently home to the HC Slovan Ústečtí Lvi ice hockey team.
