= 1993–94 Czech Extraliga season =

1993–94 Czech Extraliga
- League: Czech Extraliga
- Sport: Ice hockey
- Duration: September 1993 – April 1994
- TV partner: Česká televize

Regular season
- Presidential Cup: HC Poldi SONP Kladno

Playoffs

Finals
- Champions: HC Olomouc
- Runners-up: HC Pardubice

Czech Extraliga seasons
- ← 1992–93 1994–95 →

The 1993–94 Czech Extraliga season was the inaugural season of the Czech Extraliga, following the peaceful dissolution of Czechoslovakia midway through the 1992–93 Czechoslovak Extraliga season (which all Slovak and Czech teams played to completion). HC Olomouc won the championship, beating HC Pardubice in the finals.

== Standings ==
Place.	Team	GP	W	T	L	Goals	Pts
1.	HC Poldi SONP Kladno	44	24	8	12	182:151	56
2.	HC České Budějovice	44	23	6	15	163:120	52
3.	HC Vítkovice	44	19	11	14	162:138	49
4.	AC ZPS Zlín	44	21	7	16	154:163	49
5.	HC Sparta Praha	44	21	6	17	162:129	48
6.	HC Pardubice	44	22	4	18	142:128	48
7.	HC Olomouc	44	19	7	18	116:123	45
8.	HC Chemopetrol Litvínov	44	18	8	18	161:154	44
9.	HC Škoda Plzeň	44	15	8	21	132:140	38
10.	HC Dukla Jihlava	44	16	6	22	131:143	38
11.	HC Stadion Hradec Králové	44	12	11	21	133:163	35
12.	HC Vajgar Jindřichův Hradec	44	10	6	28	107:193	26

== Playoffs ==
=== Quarterfinals ===
HC Poldi SONP Kladno (1) - (8) HC Chemopetrol Litvínov

- HC Poldi SONP Kladno - HC Chemopetrol Litvínov 4:5 (1:1,3:2,0:2)
- HC Poldi SONP Kladno - HC Chemopetrol Litvínov 3:2 (2:1,0:1,1:0)
- HC Chemopetrol Litvínov - HC Poldi SONP Kladno 1:4 (1:1,0:1,0:2)
- HC Chemopetrol Litvínov - HC Poldi SONP Kladno 2:7 (0:2,0:4,2:1)

HC České Budějovice (2) - (7) HC Olomouc

- HC České Budějovice - HC Olomouc 1:3 (0:0,0:2,1:1)
- HC České Budějovice - HC Olomouc 2:5 (2:3,0:1,0:1)
- HC Olomouc - HC České Budějovice 4:2 (1:1,0:1,3:0)

HC Vítkovice (3) - (6) HC Pardubice

- HC Vítkovice - HC Pardubice 5:4 (0:1,4:0,1:3)
- HC Vítkovice - HC Pardubice 2:5 (1:1,1:2,0:2)
- HC Pardubice - HC Vítkovice 2:1 SN (1:1,0:0,0:0,0:0)
- HC Pardubice - HC Vítkovice 4:5 PP (2:3,2:0,0:1,0:1)
- HC Vítkovice - HC Pardubice 1:3 (0:0,0:1,1:2)

AC ZPS Zlín (4) - (5) HC Sparta Praha

- AC ZPS Zlín - HC Sparta Praha 2:3 (1:2,1:0,0:1)
- AC ZPS Zlín - HC Sparta Praha 3:5 (1:0,1:3,1:2)
- HC Sparta Praha - AC ZPS Zlín 10:0 (5:0,3:0,2:0)

=== Semifinals ===
HC Poldi SONP Kladno (1) - (7) HC Olomouc

- HC Poldi SONP Kladno - HC Olomouc 4:1 (2:0,1:1,1:0)
- HC Poldi SONP Kladno - HC Olomouc 4:1 (0:1,2:0,2:0)
- HC Olomouc - HC Poldi SONP Kladno 5:4 (3:0,1:3,1:1)
- HC Olomouc - HC Poldi SONP Kladno 6:3 (3:1,0:0,3:2)
- HC Poldi SONP Kladno - HC Olomouc 5:6 SN (4:4,0:1,1:0,0:0)

HC Sparta Praha (5) - (6) HC Pardubice

- HC Sparta Praha - HC Pardubice 2:3 SN (0:0,2:1,0:1,0:0)
- HC Sparta Praha - HC Pardubice 0:1 (0:1,0:0,0:0)
- HC Pardubice - HC Sparta Praha 2:1 SN (1:1,0:0,0:0,0:0)

=== 3rd place ===
HC Poldi SONP Kladno (1) - (5) HC Sparta Praha

- HC Sparta Praha - HC Poldi SONP Kladno 3:9 (2:4,1:1,0:4)
- HC Poldi SONP Kladno - HC Sparta Praha 7:5 (1:2,4:2,2:1)

=== Finals ===
HC Pardubice (6) - (7) HC Olomouc

- HC Olomouc - HC Pardubice 2–3, 2–1, 5–2, 2–1

HC Olomouc is Czech champion for the 1993–94 season.

== Play-Downs ==
HC Škoda Plzeň (9) - (12) HC Jindřichův Hradec

- HC Škoda Plzeň - HC Jindřichův Hradec 5–1
- HC Škoda Plzeň - HC Jindřichův Hradec 4-3 OT
- HC Jindřichův Hradec - HC Škoda Plzeň 1–0
- HC Jindřichův Hradec - HC Škoda Plzeň 2-3 SO

HC Dukla Jihlava (10) - (11) HC Hradec Králové

- HC Dukla Jihlava - HC Hradec Králové 6–3
- HC Dukla Jihlava - HC Hradec Králové 3–1
- HC Hradec Králové - HC Dukla Jihlava 3–1
- HC Hradec Králové - HC Dukla Jihlava 4–7

== Relegation ==
Place	Team	GP	W	T	L	Goals	Pts
1.	HC Vsetín	6	4	2	0	29:13	10
2.	HC Slavia Praha	6	3	1	2	21:20	7
3.	HC Hradec Králové	6	1	2	3	17:21	4
4.	HC Jindřichův Hradec	6	1	1	4	16:29	3
