= 1998–99 Czech Extraliga season =

1998–99 Czech Extraliga
- League: Czech Extraliga
- Sport: Ice hockey
- Duration: September 1998 – April 1999
- TV partner(s): Česká televize

Regular season
- Presidential Cup: HC Slovnaft Vsetín

Playoffs

Finals
- Champions: HC Slovnaft Vsetín
- Runners-up: HC ZPS-Barum Zlín

Czech Extraliga seasons
- ← 1997–98 1999–2000 →

The 1998–99 Czech Extraliga season was the sixth season of the Czech Extraliga since its creation after the breakup of Czechoslovakia and the Czechoslovak First Ice Hockey League in 1993. HC Slovnaft Vsetín won the title for their fifth successive championship.

== Standings ==
Place	Team	GP	W	T	L	Goals	Pts
1.	HC Slovnaft Vsetín	52	33	12	7	184:92	78
2.	HC ZPS-Barum Zlín	52	26	17	9	180:138	69
3.	HC Železárny Třinec	52	28	8	16	174:140	64
4.	HC Sparta Praha	52	27	9	16	186:123	63
5.	HC České Budějovice	52	23	14	15	173:129	60
6.	HC Keramika Plzeň	52	23	14	15	148:136	60
7.	HC IPB Pojišťovna Pardubice	52	20	13	19	128:126	53
8.	HC Vítkovice	52	21	8	23	147:140	50
9.	HC Chemopetrol Litvínov	52	19	10	23	130:144	48
10.	HC Slavia Praha	52	17	11	24	152:166	45
11.	HC Becherovka Karlovy Vary	52	14	10	28	130:181	38
10.	HC Bohemex Trade Opava	52	15	8	29	97:158	38
10.	HC Velvana Kladno	52	11	15	26	119:175	37
14.	HC Dukla Jihlava	52	7	11	34	88:188	25

== Playoffs ==
Quarter-finals (best-of-5)
1	HC Slovnaft Vsetín	3
8	HC Vítkovice	1
5	HC České Budějovice	0
4	HC Sparta Praha	3
3	HC Železárny Třinec	3
6	HC Keramika Plzeň	2
7	HC IPB Pojišťovna Pardubice	0
2	HC ZPS-Barum Zlín	3

Semi-finals (best-of-5)
1	HC Slovnaft Vsetín	3
4	HC Sparta Praha	2
3	HC Železárny Třinec	2
2	HC ZPS-Barum Zlín	3

Finals (best-of-5)
1	HC Slovnaft Vsetín	3
2	HC ZPS-Barum Zlín	0

== Quarterfinal ==
- HC Slovnaft Vsetín - HC Vítkovice 4:3 SN (0:2,2:1,1:0,0:0)
- HC Slovnaft Vsetín - HC Vítkovice 3:1 (0:0,3:1,0:0)
- HC Vítkovice - HC Slovnaft Vsetín 4:2 (1:0,2:1,1:1)
- HC Vítkovice - HC Slovnaft Vsetín 1:3 (0:0,1:1,0:2)
- HC Sparta Praha - HC České Budějovice4:3 SN (1:1,2:0,0:2,0:0)
- HC Sparta Praha - HC České Budějovice 2:0 (0:0,1:0,1:0)
- HC České Budějovice - HC Sparta Praha 1:3 (0:1,0:2,1:0)
- HC ZPS-Barum Zlín - HC IPB Pojišťovna Pardubice 1:0 (0:0,1:0,0:0)
- HC ZPS-Barum Zlín - HC IPB Pojišťovna Pardubice 2:0 (0:0,1:0,1:0)
- HC IPB Pojišťovna Pardubice - HC ZPS-Barum Zlín 1:2 PP (0:1,1:0,0:0,0:1)
- HC Železárny Třinec - HC Keramika Plzeň 2:4 (1:0,1:2,0:2)
- HC Železárny Třinec - HC Keramika Plzeň 4:2 (0:1,3:1,1:0)
- HC Keramika Plzeň - HC Železárny Třinec 3:2 (1:1,1:1,1:0)
- HC Keramika Plzeň - HC Železárny Třinec 3:6 (3:4,0:1,0:1)
- HC Železárny Třinec - HC Keramika Plzeň 4:1 (1:0,1:1,2:0)

== Semifinal ==
- HC Slovnaft Vsetín - HC Sparta Praha 2:1 PP (1:0,0:1,0:0,1:0)
- HC Slovnaft Vsetín - HC Sparta Praha 2:3 (1:1,0:0,1:2)
- HC Sparta Praha - HC Slovnaft Vsetín 2:4 (1:2,1:1,0:1)
- HC Sparta Praha - HC Slovnaft Vsetín 4:1 (1:0,2:1,1:0)
- HC Slovnaft Vsetín - HC Sparta Praha 1:0 SN (0:0,0:0,0:0,0:0)
- HC ZPS-Barum Zlín - HC Železárny Třinec 5:1 (2:0,2:1,1:0)
- HC ZPS-Barum Zlín - HC Železárny Třinec 2:1 (1:1,0:0,1:0)
- HC Železárny Třinec - HC ZPS-Barum Zlín 5:1 (1:1,2:0,2:0)
- HC Železárny Třinec - HC ZPS-Barum Zlín 5:4 (1:2,1:2,3:0)
- HC ZPS-Barum Zlín - HC Železárny Třinec 3:2 (2:1,0:0,1:1)

=== Final ===
- HC Slovnaft Vsetín - HC ZPS-Barum Zlín 3-1, 4-3, 4-2

HC Slovnaft Vsetín is Czech champion for 1998-99.

== Relegation ==
- HC Dukla Jihlava - HC Znojemští Orli 3:4
- HC Dukla Jihlava - HC Znojemští Orli 1:6 (1:2,0:2,0:2)
- HC Dukla Jihlava - HC Znojemští Orli 2:3 PP (1:1,1:1,0:0,0:1)
- HC Znojemští Orli - HC Dukla Jihlava 4:1 (1:1,3:0,0:0)
- HC Znojemští Orli - HC Dukla Jihlava 2:3 PP (0:0,2:0,0:2,0:1)
- HC Dukla Jihlava - HC Znojemští Orli 8:2 (1:0,3:0,4:2)
- HC Znojemští Orli - HC Dukla Jihlava 1:3 (0:0,1:2,0:1)
- HC Dukla Jihlava - HC Znojemští Orli 2:3 (0:0,0:2,2:1)
