= 1996–97 Czech Extraliga season =

1996–97 Czech Extraliga
- League: Czech Extraliga
- Sport: Ice hockey
- Duration: September 1996 – April 1997
- TV partner(s): Česká televize

Regular season
- Presidential Cup: HC Petra Vsetín

Playoffs

Finals
- Champions: HC Petra Vsetín
- Runners-up: HC Vítkovice

Czech Extraliga seasons
- ← 1995–96 1997–98 →

The 1996–97 Czech Extraliga season was the fourth season of the Czech Extraliga since its creation after the breakup of Czechoslovakia and the Czechoslovak First Ice Hockey League in 1993. Coached by Jan Neliba, HC Petra Vsetín won their third consecutive league title.

== Standings ==
Place	Team	GP	W	T	L	Goals	Pts
1.	HC Petra Vsetín	52	34	7	11	198:120	75
2.	HC Sparta Praha	52	28	11	13	227:168	67
3.	HC Vítkovice	52	25	12	15	160:120	62
4.	HC Železárny Třinec	52	23	10	19	175:152	56
5.	HC IPB Pojišťovna Pardubice	52	25	5	22	170:164	55
6.	HC Poldi Kladno	52	21	12	19	132:152	54
7.	HC České Budějovice	52	20	12	20	149:145	52
8.	HC Slavia Praha	52	21	10	21	166:167	52
9.	HC Chemopetrol Litvínov	52	20	12	20	171:185	52
10.	AC ZPS Zlín	52	22	6	24	179:179	50
11.	HC ZKZ Plzeň	52	19	9	24	155:172	47
12.	HC Olomouc	52	16	11	25	122:155	43
13.	HC Dukla Jihlava	52	13	10	29	140:187	36
14.	HC Slezan Opava	52	10	7	35	125:203	27

== Playoffs ==
=== Quarterfinal ===
- HC Petra Vsetín - HC Slavia Praha 2:1 (2:0,0:0,0:1)
- HC Petra Vsetín - HC Slavia Praha 4:1 (3:0,1:1,0:0)
- HC Slavia Praha - HC Petra Vsetín 0:7 (0:2,0:4,0:1)
- HC Železárny Třinec - HC IPB Pojišťovna Pardubice 1:4 (0:0,1:1,0:3)
- HC Železárny Třinec - HC IPB Pojišťovna Pardubice 4:3 (3:1,0:1,1:1)
- HC IPB Pojišťovna Pardubice - HC Železárny Třinec 6:1 (2:1,2:0,2:0)
- HC IPB Pojišťovna Pardubice - HC Železárny Třinec 6:0 (3:0,1:0,2:0)
- HC Vítkovice - HC Poldi Kladno 6:2 (3:0,1:2,2:0)
- HC Vítkovice - HC Poldi Kladno 3:0 (0:0,0:0,3:0)
- HC Poldi Kladno - HC Vítkovice 3:8 (1:3,2:3,0:2)
- HC Sparta Praha - HC České Budějovice 3:4 SN (1:1,1:2,1:0,0:0)
- HC Sparta Praha - HC České Budějovice 3:1 (2:0,1:0,0:1)
- HC České Budějovice - HC Sparta Praha 4:2 (2:1,1:0,1:1)
- HC České Budějovice - HC Sparta Praha 2:4 (0:1,0:2,2:1)
- HC Sparta Praha - HC České Budějovice 5:2 (1:0,3:0,1:2)

=== Semifinal ===
- HC Petra Vsetín - HC IPB Pojišťovna Pardubice 10:1 (6:0,1:0,3:1)
- HC Petra Vsetín - HC IPB Pojišťovna Pardubice 5:1 (1:0,2:1,2:0)
- HC IPB Pojišťovna Pardubice - HC Petra Vsetín 3:2 PP (2:2,0:0,0:0,1:0)
- HC IPB Pojišťovna Pardubice - HC Petra Vsetín 1:4 (0:0,0:3,1:1)
- HC Sparta Praha - HC Vítkovice 2:6 (1:3,1:1,0:2)
- HC Sparta Praha - HC Vítkovice 2:3 PP (0:0,1:0,1:2,0:1)
- HC Vítkovice - HC Sparta Praha 4:2 (1:1,1:0,2:1)

=== 3rd place ===
- HC IPB Pojišťovna Pardubice - HC Sparta Praha 5:6 PP (1:1,0:2,4:2,0:1)
- HC Sparta Praha - HC IPB Pojišťovna Pardubice 4:1 (2:1,0:0,2:0)

=== Final ===
- HC Petra Vsetín - HC Vítkovice 3-1, 4-2, 2-0

HC Petra Vsetín is 1996–97 Czech champion.

== Relegation ==
=== First series ===
- HC Dukla Jihlava - HC Kralupy nad Vltavou 4:2 (1:2,3:0,0:0)
- HC Dukla Jihlava - HC Kralupy nad Vltavou 3:1 (2:0,0:0,1:1)
- HC Kralupy nad Vltavou - HC Dukla Jihlava 3:1 (0:0,1:0,2:1)
- HC Kralupy nad Vltavou - HC Dukla Jihlava 0:3 (0:2,0:1,0:0)
- HC Dukla Jihlava - HC Kralupy nad Vltavou 7:0 (1:0,2:0,4:0)

=== Second series ===
- HC Slezan Opava - HC Becherovka Karlovy Vary 6:1 (0:0,2:0,4:1)
- HC Slezan Opava - HC Becherovka Karlovy Vary 4:1 (0:1,2:0,2:0)
- HC Becherovka Karlovy Vary - HC Slezan Opava 3:4 SN (1:1,2:1,0:1,0:0)
- HC Becherovka Karlovy Vary - HC Slezan Opava 4:2 (1:0,2:2,1:0)
- HC Slezan Opava - HC Becherovka Karlovy Vary 1:3 (0:1,0:1,1:1)
- HC Becherovka Karlovy Vary - HC Slezan Opava 5:4 SN (1:0,1:3,2:1,0:0)
- HC Slezan Opava - HC Becherovka Karlovy Vary 4:3 (2:1,1:2,1:0)
