= AZ Havířov =

- City: Havířov, Czech Republic
- League: Czech Second League; 2010–2013, 2022–present: Czech First League 1993–1999, 2003–2010, 2013–2022; Czech Extraliga 1999–2003
- Founded: 1928
- Home arena: Gascontrol Arena (5,100 seats)
- Colors
- General manager: Roman Šimíček
- Head coach: Marek Pavlačka

AZ Havířov is an ice hockey team in the Czech Second Hockey League (third-tier league) from Havířov.

The city of Havířov was established in 1955. However the beginnings of ice hockey in surrounding villages date back to 1928, when workers began to skate on local ponds after their shift. The hockey club was registered in 1931 as KČT Lazy, named after the Lazy Coal Mine. In 1966 the club moved to Havířov and was given the name AZ Havířov after Antonín Zápotocký Coal Mine. In 1992 the club was promoted to the second-level league.

In 1999 the club bought the Extraliga license from Slezan Opava. In the 2002/2003 season Havířov lost the relegation play-off against HC Kladno and was relegated to the First National Hockey League. Since that time the club was constantly haunted by the financial problems. Finally, in January 2010 the club announced insolvency and the remaining games were lost by forfeit. According to the ice hockey federation rules, the club is automatically relegated to the lower division, i.e. the Second National Hockey League.

In 2022, Havířov relegated to Czech 2. liga.

== Team names ==
- 1931–1948: KČT Lazy (Czech Tourists Club Lazy)
- 1948–1953: Sokol Lazy
- 1953–late 1950s: DSO Baník Zápotocký (Voluntary sports organization Baník Zápotocký)
- late 1950s–1966: TJ Důl AZ (Physical education unit Antonín Zápotocký Mine)
- 1966–1993: TJ AZ Havířov (Physical education unit AZ Havířov)
- 1993–1999: HC Havířov
- 1999–2001: HC Femax Havířov
- 2001–2010: HC Havířov Panthers
- 2010–2017: HC AZ Havířov 2010
- 2017–2020: AZ Residomo Havířov
- 2020–2022: AZ Heimstaden Havířov
- 2022–present: AZ Havířov

== Season-by-season record ==
=== Czechoslovakia ===
| Season | Division | Level | Final standing | Notes |
|---|---|---|---|---|
| 1966–67 | North Moravian Regional Championship | 3 | 1st | |
| 1967–68 | North Moravian Regional Championship | 3 | 1st | Promoted |
| 1968–69 | Second League Gr. B | 2 | 8th | |
| 1969–70 | First National League Gr. B | 2 | 5th | |
| 1970–71 | First National League Gr. B | 2 | 8th | |
| 1971–72 | First National League Gr. B | 2 | 6th | |
| 1972–73 | First National League Gr. B | 2 | 8th | Relegated |
| 1973–74 | Second National League Gr. C | 3 | 3rd | |
| 1974–75 | Second National League Gr. C | 3 | 3rd | |
| 1975–76 | Second National League Gr. C | 3 | 3rd | |
| 1976–77 | Second National League Gr. C | 3 | 6th | |
| 1977–78 | Second National League Gr. D | 3 | 3rd | |
| 1978–79 | Second National League Gr. D | 3 | 5th | Relegated |
| 1979–80 | North Moravian Regional Championship | 4 | | |
| 1980–81 | North Moravian Regional Championship | 4 | 3rd | |
| 1981–82 | North Moravian Regional Championship | 4 | 1st | |
| 1982–83 | North Moravian Regional Championship | 4 | 1st | Promoted |
| 1983–84 | Second National League Gr. C | 3 | 5th | |
| 1984–85 | Second National League Gr. C | 3 | 3rd | |
| 1985–86 | Second National League Gr. C | 3 | 3rd | |
| 1986–87 | Second National League Gr. C | 3 | 1st | |
| 1987–88 | Second National League Gr. C | 3 | 4th | |
| 1988–89 | Second National League Gr. C | 3 | 5th | |
| 1989–90 | Second National League Gr. C | 3 | 5th | |
| 1990–91 | Second National League Gr. C | 3 | 2nd | |
| 1991–92 | Second National League Gr. D | 3 | 1st | Promoted |
| 1992–93 | First National League | 2 | 8th | Reorganization of the competition |

=== Czech Republic ===
| Season | Division | Level | Final standing | Notes |
|---|---|---|---|---|
| 1993–94 | First League | 2 | 7th | |
| 1994–95 | First League | 2 | 4th | |
| 1995–96 | First League | 2 | 5th | |
| 1996–97 | First League | 2 | 10th | |
| 1997–98 | First League | 2 | 6th | |
| 1998–99 | First League | 2 | 12th | Purchase of an extraleague license |
| 1999–00 | Czech Extraliga | 1 | 13th | |
| 2000–01 | Czech Extraliga | 1 | 13th | |
| 2001–02 | Czech Extraliga | 1 | 11th | |
| 2002–03 | Czech Extraliga | 1 | 14th | Relegated |
| 2003–04 | First League | 2 | 10th | |
| 2004–05 | First League | 2 | 10th | |
| 2005–06 | First League | 2 | 3rd | |
| 2006–07 | First League | 2 | 10th | |
| 2007–08 | First League Gr. East | 2 | 4th | |
| 2008–09 | First League | 2 | 10th | |
| 2009–10 | First League | 2 | 16th | Relegated |
| 2010–11 | Second League Gr. East | 3 | 6th | |
| 2011–12 | Second League Gr. East | 3 | 1st | |
| 2012–13 | Second League Gr. East | 3 | 1st | Promoted |
| 2013–14 | First League | 2 | 6th | |
| 2014–15 | First League | 2 | 6th | |
| 2015–16 | First League | 2 | 8th | |
| 2016–17 | First League | 2 | 12th | |
| 2017–18 | First League | 2 | 7th | |
| 2018–19 | First League | 2 | 6th | |
| 2019–20 | First League | 2 | – | Season abandoned |
| 2020–21 | First League | 2 | 13th | |
| 2021–22 | First League | 2 | 16th | Relegated |
| 2022–23 | Second League Gr. East | 3 | 3rd | |
| 2023–24 | Second League Gr. East | 3 | 1st | Lost playoff final 4 games to 3 against Piráti Chomutov |
| 2024–25 | Second League Gr. East | 3 | 1st | Lost playoff final 4 games to 1 against HC Tábor |
| 2025–26 | Second League Gr. East | 3 | 1st | Promoted |
