= 1997–98 Czech Extraliga season =

1997–98 Czech Extraliga
- League: Czech Extraliga
- Sport: Ice hockey
- Duration: September 1997 – April 1998
- TV partner(s): Česká televize

Regular season
- Presidential Cup: HC Petra Vsetín

Playoffs

Finals
- Champions: HC Petra Vsetín
- Runners-up: HC Železárny Třinec

Czech Extraliga seasons
- ← 1996–97 1998–99 →

The 1997–98 Czech Extraliga season was the fifth season of the Czech Extraliga since its creation after the breakup of Czechoslovakia and the Czechoslovak First Ice Hockey League in 1993. HC Petra Vsetín won their fourth consecutive league title.

== Standings ==
| Place | Team | GP | W | T | L | Goals | Pts |
|---|---|---|---|---|---|---|---|
| 1. | HC Petra Vsetín | 52 | 33 | 6 | 13 | 181:116 | 72 |
| 2. | HC Vítkovice | 52 | 31 | 7 | 14 | 174:142 | 69 |
| 3. | HC Železárny Třinec | 52 | 29 | 11 | 12 | 189:156 | 69 |
| 4. | HC Sparta Praha | 52 | 27 | 10 | 15 | 176:117 | 64 |
| 5. | HC Keramika Plzeň | 52 | 24 | 11 | 17 | 160:146 | 59 |
| 6. | HC Slavia Praha | 52 | 22 | 12 | 18 | 152:132 | 56 |
| 7. | HC Chemopetrol Litvínov | 52 | 22 | 12 | 18 | 167:128 | 56 |
| 8. | HC IPB Pojišťovna Pardubice | 52 | 22 | 8 | 22 | 158:149 | 52 |
| 9. | HC Dukla Jihlava | 52 | 21 | 9 | 22 | 137:139 | 51 |
| 10. | HC České Budějovice | 52 | 19 | 10 | 23 | 149:149 | 48 |
| 11. | HC ZPS Barum Zlín | 52 | 20 | 8 | 24 | 166:183 | 48 |
| 12. | HC Velvana Kladno | 52 | 11 | 10 | 31 | 124:194 | 32 |
| 13. | HC Becherovka Karlovy Vary | 52 | 9 | 12 | 31 | 130:202 | 30 |
| 14. | HC Bohemex Trade Opava | 52 | 7 | 8 | 37 | 101:211 | 22 |

== Playoffs ==
=== Quarterfinal ===
- HC Petra Vsetín - HC IPB Pojišťovna Pardubice 7:0 (2:0,3:0,2:0)
- HC Petra Vsetín - HC IPB Pojišťovna Pardubice 5:2 (2:1,2:1,1:0)
- HC IPB Pojišťovna Pardubice - HC Petra Vsetín 3:4 (0:2,2:1,1:1)
- HC Sparta Praha - HC Keramika Plzeň 2:3 SN (1:0,0:1,1:1,0:0)
- HC Sparta Praha - HC Keramika Plzeň 4:2 (2:2,1:0,1:0)
- HC Keramika Plzeň - HC Sparta Praha 5:2 (1:2,1:0,3:0)
- HC Keramika Plzeň - HC Sparta Praha 1:2 (0:0,1:0,0:2)
- HC Sparta Praha - HC Keramika Plzeň 4:1 (2:0,1:1,1:0)
- HC Vítkovice - HC Chemopetrol Litvínov 5:2 (0:1,2:1,3:0)
- HC Vítkovice - HC Chemopetrol Litvínov 6:5 (1:1,2:3,3:1)
- HC Chemopetrol Litvínov - HC Vítkovice 2:0 (0:0,1:0,1:0)
- HC Chemopetrol Litvínov - HC Vítkovice 3:4 (1:2,2:2,0:0)
- HC Železárny Třinec - HC Slavia Praha 4:3 (2:1,1:0,1:2)
- HC Železárny Třinec - HC Slavia Praha 3:4 (1:1,1:3,1:0)
- HC Slavia Praha - HC Železárny Třinec 4:5 SN (2:3,2:1,0:0,0:0)
- HC Slavia Praha - HC Železárny Třinec 7:4 (3:2,1:1,3:1)
- HC Železárny Třinec - HC Slavia Praha 7:0 (1:0,3:0,3:0)

=== Semifinal ===
- HC Petra Vsetín - HC Sparta Praha 4:1 (2:0,2:1,0:0)
- HC Petra Vsetín - HC Sparta Praha 3:1 (0:0,2:1,1:0)
- HC Sparta Praha - HC Petra Vsetín 4:1 (2:0,0:1,2:0)
- HC Sparta Praha - HC Petra Vsetín 2:5 (0:2,1:2,1:1)
- HC Vítkovice - HC Železárny Třinec 6:5 (3:3,2:1,1:1)
- HC Vítkovice - HC Železárny Třinec 0:4 (0:3,0:1,0:0)
- HC Železárny Třinec - HC Vítkovice 3:1 (0:0,2:0,1:1)
- HC Železárny Třinec - HC Vítkovice 1:4 (1:2,0:2,0:0)
- HC Vítkovice - HC Železárny Třinec 1:4 (0:0,1:2,0:2)

=== 3rd place ===
- HC Sparta Praha - HC Vítkovice 4:9 (2:0,0:6,2:3)
- HC Vítkovice - HC Sparta Praha 1:2 (1:1,0:1,0:0)

=== Final ===
- HC Petra Vsetín - HC Železárny Třinec 5-1, 4-1, 3-1

HC Petra Vsetín is Czech champion for 1997-98.

== Relegation ==
- HC Bohemex Trade Opava - HC Znojemští Orli 1:4 (1:1,0:2,0:1)
- HC Bohemex Trade Opava - HC Znojemští Orli 1:2 (0:0,1:2,0:0)
- HC Znojemští Orli - HC Bohemex Trade Opava 3:2 (1:0,2:2,0:0)
- HC Znojemští Orli - HC Bohemex Trade Opava 1:4 (0:2,1:1,0:1)
- HC Bohemex Trade Opava - HC Znojemští Orli 6:4 (2:1,2:1,2:2)
- HC Znojemští Orli - HC Bohemex Trade Opava 2:3 PP (0:2,0:0,2:0,0:1)
- HC Bohemex Trade Opava - HC Znojemští Orli 6:0 (3:0,2:0,1:0)
