= 1999–2000 Czech Extraliga season =

1999–2000 Czech Extraliga
- League: Czech Extraliga
- Sport: Ice hockey
- Duration: September 1999 – April 2000
- TV partner: Česká televize

Regular season
- Presidential Cup: HC Sparta Praha

Playoffs

Finals
- Champions: HC Sparta Praha
- Runners-up: HC Slovnaft Vsetín

Czech Extraliga seasons
- ← 1998–99 2000–01 →

The 1999–2000 Czech Extraliga season was the seventh season of the Czech Extraliga since its creation after the breakup of Czechoslovakia and the Czechoslovak First Ice Hockey League in 1993. Defending champions HC Slovnaft Vsetín reached the finals for the sixth consecutive year, but were defeated there by new champions HC Sparta Praha.

== Standings ==
Place	Team	GP	W	T	L	Goals	Pts
1.	HC Sparta Praha	52	34	8	10	193:112	76
2.	HC Barum Continental Zlín	52	27	11	4	166:116	65
3.	HC Slovnaft Vsetín	52	28	9	15	160:140	65
4.	HC Oceláři Třinec	52	29	6	17	192:154	64
5.	HC Keramika Plzeň	52	26	11	15	151:113	63
6.	HC České Budějovice	52	25	11	16	163:152	61
7.	HC Chemopetrol Litvínov	52	22	11	19	151:140	55
8.	HC IPB Pojišťovna Pardubice	52	18	9	25	153:173	45
9.	HC Excalibur Znojemští Orli	52	16	11	25	140:169	43
10.	HC Slavia Praha	52	14	13	25	100:138	41
11.	HC Becherovka Karlovy Vary	52	14	12	26	153:185	40
12.	HC Velvana Kladno	52	13	12	27	121:164	38
13.	HC Femax Havířov	52	14	10	28	130:173	38
14.	HC Vítkovice	52	10	14	28	117:161	34

== Playoffs ==
=== Quarterfinal ===
- HC Sparta Praha - HC ČSOB Pojišťovna Pardubice 3:1 (1:0,1:0,1:1)
- HC Sparta Praha - HC ČSOB Pojišťovna Pardubice 2:1 (0:0,2:1,0:0)
- HC ČSOB Pojišťovna Pardubice - HC Sparta Praha 1:5 (0:2,0:2,1:1)
- HC Hamé Zlín - HC Chemopetrol 1:2 (0:0,0:1,1:1)
- HC Hamé Zlín - HC Chemopetrol 2:4 (1:0,0:2,1:2)
- HC Chemopetrol - HC Hamé Zlín 2:3 (0:1,1:1,1:1)
- HC Chemopetrol - HC Hamé Zlín 3:1 (0:0,0:0,3:1)
- HC Slovnaft Vsetín - HC České Budějovice 3:0 (2:0,1:0,0:0)
- HC Slovnaft Vsetín - HC České Budějovice 6:3 (1:1,2:2,3:0)
- HC České Budějovice - HC Slovnaft Vsetín 0:3 (0:2,0:1,0:0)
- HC Oceláři Třinec - HC Keramika Plzeň 3:1 (1:0,1:0,1:1)
- HC Oceláři Třinec - HC Keramika Plzeň 1:3 (0:1,0:1,1:1)
- HC Keramika Plzeň - HC Oceláři Třinec 9:0 (1:0,7:0,1:0)
- HC Keramika Plzeň - HC Oceláři Třinec 4:3 SN (1:2,1:1,1:0,0:0)

=== Semifinal ===
- HC Sparta Praha - HC Chemopetrol 4:1 (3:1,1:0,0:0)
- HC Sparta Praha - HC Chemopetrol 3:1 (1:0,1:1,1:0)
- HC Chemopetrol - HC Sparta Praha 3:4 SN (1:2,0:1,2:0,0:0)
- HC Slovnaft Vsetín - HC Keramika Plzeň 2:0 (1:0,0:0,1:0)
- HC Slovnaft Vsetín - HC Keramika Plzeň 3:2 (1:0,0:0,2:2)
- HC Keramika Plzeň - HC Slovnaft Vsetín 2:3 PP (1:1,0:0,1:1,0:1)

=== Final ===
- HC Sparta Praha - HC Slovnaft Vsetín 4–2, 4–0, 1–0

HC Sparta Praha is 1999-00 Czech champion.

== Relegation ==
- HC Vítkovice - HC Dukla Jihlava 4:0
- HC Vítkovice - HC Dukla Jihlava 3:0 (1:0,1:0,1:0)
- HC Vítkovice - HC Dukla Jihlava 3:1 (1:1,2:0,0:0)
- HC Dukla Jihlava - HC Vítkovice 2:3 (0:1,2:2,0:0)
- HC Dukla Jihlava - HC Vítkovice 1:2 PP (1:0,0:0,0:1,0:1)
