= 1995–96 Czech Extraliga season =

1995–96 Czech Extraliga
- League: Czech Extraliga
- Sport: Ice hockey
- Duration: September 1995 – April 1996
- TV partner(s): Česká televize

Regular season
- Presidential Cup: HC Sparta Praha

Playoffs

Finals
- Champions: HC Petra Vsetín
- Runners-up: HC Litvínov

Czech Extraliga seasons
- ← 1994–95 1996–97 →

The 1995–96 Czech Extraliga season was the third season of the Czech Extraliga since its creation after the breakup of Czechoslovakia and the Czechoslovak First Ice Hockey League in 1993. HC Petra Vsetín and coach Horst Valášek won the league for the second consecutive year, beating HC Litvínov in the finals.

== Standings ==
Place	Team	GP	W	T	L	Goals	Pts
1.	HC Sparta Praha	40	27	3	10	152:108	57
2.	HC Petra Vsetín	40	24	7	9	149:85	55
3.	HC České Budějovice	40	20	9	11	120:85	49
4.	HC Litvínov	40	21	7	12	155:117	49
5.	AC ZPS Zlín	40	20	6	14	126:111	46
6.	HC Slavia Praha	40	18	5	17	148:140	41
7.	HC Olomouc	40	16	8	16	112:109	40
8.	HC Poldi Kladno	40	17	5	18	127:131	39
9.	HC Vítkovice	40	13	11	16	105:121	37
10.	HC Dukla Jihlava	40	13	9	18	115:142	35
11.	HC ZKZ Plzeň	40	12	7	21	103:134	31
12.	HC Železárny Třinec	40	12	6	22	128:162	30
13.	HC IPB Pojišťovna Pardubice	40	12	4	24	103:128	28
14.	HC Kometa BVV Brno	40	9	5	26	95:165	23

== Playoffs ==
=== First round ===
- AC ZPS Zlín - HC Železárny Třinec 4:1 (1:1,1:0,2:0)
- AC ZPS Zlín - HC Železárny Třinec 6:3 (4:2,2:1,0:0)
- HC Železárny Třinec - AC ZPS Zlín 2:3 (1:0,0:3,1:0)
- HC Slavia Praha - HC ZKZ Plzeň 4:2 (1:1,1:0,2:1)
- HC Slavia Praha - HC ZKZ Plzeň 7:2 (3:1,2:1,2:0)
- HC ZKZ Plzeň - HC Slavia Praha 3:5 (0:1,2:3,1:1)
- HC Olomouc - HC Dukla Jihlava 2:5 (0:0,1:3,1:2)
- HC Olomouc - HC Dukla Jihlava 5:3 (2:0,2:1,1:2)
- HC Dukla Jihlava - HC Olomouc 3:1 (2:0,1:0,0:1)
- HC Dukla Jihlava - HC Olomouc 5:3 (0:1,3:2,2:0)
- HC Poldi Kladno - HC Vítkovice 4:2 (2:0,0:1,2:1)
- HC Poldi Kladno - HC Vítkovice 4:3 SN (2:0,0:1,1:2,0:0)
- HC Vítkovice - HC Poldi Kladno 4:0 (2:0,0:0,2:0)
- HC Vítkovice - HC Poldi Kladno 2:3 (1:1,1:2,0:0)

=== Quarterfinal ===
- HC Sparta Praha - HC Dukla Jihlava 2:1 (1:0,1:1,0:0)
- HC Sparta Praha - HC Dukla Jihlava 6:2 (2:0,3:2,1:0)
- HC Dukla Jihlava - HC Sparta Praha 2:5 (1:1,0:3,1:1)
- HC Dukla Jihlava - HC Sparta Praha 4:5 PP (2:3,2:0,0:1,0:1)
- HC Litvínov - AC ZPS Zlín 6:3 (1:0,3:0,2:3)
- HC Litvínov - AC ZPS Zlín 2:3 PP (1:0,1:1,0:1,0:1)
- AC ZPS Zlín - HC Litvínov 2:3 SN (1:0,1:1,0:1,0:0)
- AC ZPS Zlín - HC Litvínov 2:3 (1:1,0:2,1:0)
- HC Litvínov - AC ZPS Zlín 3:2 (0:1,1:1,2:0)
- HC Petra Vsetín - HC Poldi Kladno 3:0 (0:0,1:0,2:0)
- HC Petra Vsetín - HC Poldi Kladno 4:3 PP (0:0,2:1,1:2,1:0)
- HC Poldi Kladno - HC Petra Vsetín 2:4 (1:1,0:1,1:2)
- HC Poldi Kladno - HC Petra Vsetín 1:2 (0:1,1:0,0:1)
- HC České Budějovice - HC Slavia Praha 5:3 (1:0,2:0,2:3)
- HC České Budějovice - HC Slavia Praha 3:2 (3:1,0:1,0:0)
- HC Slavia Praha - HC České Budějovice 3:4 (1:0,0:3,2:1)
- HC Slavia Praha - HC České Budějovice 1:5 (0:1,0:2,1:2)

=== Semifinal ===
- HC Sparta Praha - HC Litvínov 4:1 (1:1,2:0,1:0)
- HC Sparta Praha - HC Litvínov 4:6 (1:1,0:3,3:2)
- HC Litvínov - HC Sparta Praha 4:1 (2:1,1:0,1:0)
- HC Litvínov - HC Sparta Praha 0:5 (0:2,0:0,0:3)
- HC Sparta Praha - HC Litvínov 1:6 (0:2,0:1,1:3)
- HC Litvínov - HC Sparta Praha 5:4 SN (1:1,2:2,1:1,0:0)
- HC Petra Vsetín - HC České Budějovice 4:0 (1:0,1:0,2:0)
- HC Petra Vsetín - HC České Budějovice 5:2 (2:1,1:1,2:0)
- HC České Budějovice - HC Petra Vsetín 2:3 (1:1,1:1,0:1)
- HC České Budějovice - HC Petra Vsetín 1:4 (0:1,1:2,0:1)

=== 3rd place ===
- HC České Budějovice - HC Sparta Praha 2:5 (1:3,0:1,1:1)
- HC Sparta Praha - HC České Budějovice 3:2 (1:0,1:2,1:0)

=== Final ===
- HC Petra Vsetín - HC Litvínov 1-2, 8-1, 6-1, 4-1, 2-1

HC Petra Vsetín is 1995-96 Czech champion.

== Relegation ==
Place	Team	GP	W	T	L	Goals	Pts
9.	HC Opava	6	8	1	3	47:38	17
10.	HC IPB Pojišťovna Pardubice	6	8	0	4	66:35	16
11.	HC Kometa Brno	6	5	2	5	38:46	12
12.	HC Přerov	6	1	1	10	26:58	3
