= HC Slovan Ústečtí Lvi =

HC Slovan Ústí nad Labem
- City: Ústí nad Labem, Czech Republic
- League: Czech 2. liga 1997–2000, 2022–present: Czech 1.liga 1993-1997, 2000–2007, 2008–2022; Czech Extraliga 2007-2008
- Founded: 1963
- Home arena: Zimní stadion Ústí nad Labem (6500 seats)
- Colors
- General manager: (Czech Republic) Jan Čaloun
- Head coach: (Czech Republic) Miroslav Mach

Franchise history
- 1966 - 2007: HC Slovan Ústí nad Labem
- 2007–2013: HC Slovan Ústečtí Lvi
- 2013 - present: HC Slovan Ústí nad Labem

HC Slovan Ústečti Lvi is an ice hockey team in the Czech 2nd League (2. národní hokejová liga) (the second division). Their home arena is Zimní stadion Ústí nad Labem in Ústí nad Labem. The team was known as HC Slovan Ústí nad labem.

== History ==
=== Predecessors ===
The birth of ice hockey in Ústí nad Labem dates back to the end of the Second World War. In 1945 a group of enthusiasts got together with Jaroslav Kropáč as a leading figure and in 1946 they founded the hockey club, Sokol Ústí nad Labem. After couple of months they took their cue from their namesake in Prague and founded LTC (1946–1948). They entered the North-west group of winter sports and started to regularly enter the regional competitions.

In the following years (1949–1959) the club changed its name to ZSJ Armaturka. In 1959 the club changed its owner and subsequently its name to TJ Chemička and played under this name until 1963. However, in this year the chemical company ceased funding of the hockey club due to financial difficulties.

=== HC Slovan Ústí nad Labem (1966–1999) ===
After numerous meetings with the city representatives it was decided not to allow the death of hockey in the city. At that time TJ Slovan National Board came up with the solution to run hockey club as their main field of activities. The hockey club was then handed in to chairman JUDr. Oldřich Rejna, who stayed in this position for another 23 years. In 1966 the team won TJ Slovan qualification achieving promotion to the second league, in which they played until 1972. After the 1971/72 season there was a change in the organisational structure of the whole competition. The First National League was created and the club then had to achieve the very demanding qualification standards to be admitted to the First National Hockey League. The team was immediately very successful finishing runners up in the 72/73 season, only one point behind Slezan Opava. The next 10 years saw the team regularly finishing the championship season in the top 3. In the 1979/80 season the team won the First National Hockey League championship by 7 points, but lost the Extra League promotion/relegation match against TJ Gottwaldov. In the following season Slovan won in its group stage again but this time only managed 3rd place in the finals.

The 1986/87 season saw a crisis hit hockey in Ústí. In that year Slovan just managed to survive with the team avoiding relegation by just one position. This however was only delaying the inevitable, and in the following year Slovan was relegated to the 2nd league. In the 1988/89 season the team won the 2nd league by 16 points, winning 23 of the 28 regular season group games. Nobody doubted the teams return to the 1st league after only 1 season out. However, Slovan didn’t manage to take its chance and failed to win the promotion/relegation match staying in the 2nd league and waiting 5 long years before a great 92 season saw them finally return to the 1st league in '93.

The 1993/94 season was, and still is, the most successful in the club's history. Slovan reached 5th place and then in the quarter-final of the playoffs, eliminated HC Slezan Opava with a 3 games to 1 victory. Slovan's advance was stopped in the semifinals by HC Dadák Vsetín who then went on to win promotion into the Extraliga.

After the 1997/98 season, due to major financial issues, the club was forced to sell its stake in the competition to KLH Chomutov and in the following year the club just managed to stay in its group, barely avoiding relegation to the regional championship.

=== HC Slovan Ústečtí Lvi (1999–) ===
The major financial issues that brought on the shocking '97 season and the sale of its stake in the 1st League to Piráti Chomutov was such a major setback for the team, that it took 10 years for HC Slovan to drag itself from the very bottom of the 2nd league back up among the top national teams. In a long turn around, HC Slovan went from a low of 12th place in the 2nd league through a run, being promoted back to the 1st League in 2000, winning the first league in the 2005-06 season, winning again in the 2006-07 season, to winning the relegation match, gaining entry into the Extraliga for the 2007-08 season. The financial ability and international ringers in the Extra League made it almost impossible for HC Slovan Ústečtí Lvi to survive being relegated back to the Czech 1. liga and at the end of a hard fought season they were relegated back to the 1st League.

Back in the 1st League HC Slovan continued to show its dominance by winning the championship in the 2008-09 and 2009-10 seasons, finishing runner up in the 2010-11, and 2011-12 seasons, and finishing 3rd in the championship in the 2012-13 season.

The 2013-14 season saw a dramatic fall from HC Slovan finishing only 10th in the regular season.

The 2014-15 season also saw a poor season, languishing in 10th on the table.

The 2015-16 season saw an improvement to 8th with a notable playoffs run beating the 1st ranked team, Rytíři Kladno in the quarterfinals. The season ended in a semi-final loss to Jihlava.

The 2016-17 season saw further improvement to 6th, but a tough match up again against Kladno ended the season at the quarterfinals.
