= 1994–95 Czech Extraliga season =

1994–95 Czech Extraliga
- League: Czech Extraliga
- Sport: Ice hockey
- Duration: September 1994 – April 1995
- TV partner(s): Česká televize

Regular season
- Presidential Cup: HC Dadák Vsetín

Playoffs

Finals
- Champions: HC Dadák Vsetín
- Runners-up: AC ZPS Zlín

Czech Extraliga seasons
- ← 1993–94 1995–96 →

The 1994–95 Czech Extraliga season was the second season of the Czech Extraliga since its creation after the breakup of Czechoslovakia and the Czechoslovak First Ice Hockey League in 1993. HC Dadák Vsetín won the championship for the first time.

== Standings ==
Place	Team	GP	W	T	L	Goals	Pts
1.	HC Dadák Vsetín	44	23	8	13	141:107	54
2.	HC Kladno	44	24	6	14	178:142	54
3.	HC Olomouc	44	19	10	15	130:124	48
4.	AC ZPS Zlín	44	20	8	16	158:149	48
5.	HC Interconex Plzeň	44	16	14	14	118:112	46
6.	HC České Budějovice	44	20	6	18	142:124	46
7.	HC Slavia Praha	44	18	7	19	133:164	43
8.	HC Chemopetrol Litvínov	44	18	6	20	149:143	42
9.	HC Sparta Praha	44	16	9	19	123:129	41
10.	HC Vítkovice	44	18	5	21	144:156	41
11.	HC Pardubice	44	13	11	20	134:151	37
12.	HC Dukla Jihlava	44	12	4	28	117:166	28

== Playoffs ==
=== Quarterfinal ===
- HC Dadák Vsetín - HC Chemopetrol Litvínov 3:0 (1:0,2:0,0:0)
- HC Dadák Vsetín - HC Chemopetrol Litvínov 4:2 (0:1,0:1,4:0)
- HC Chemopetrol Litvínov - HC Dadák Vsetín 6:3 (1:0,3:1,2:2)
- HC Chemopetrol Litvínov - HC Dadák Vsetín 1:5 (0:3,0:0,1:2)
- HC Kladno - HC Slavia Praha 7:4 (1:0,0:1,6:3)
- HC Kladno - HC Slavia Praha 4:2 (2:1,1:0,1:1)
- HC Slavia Praha - HC Kladno 2:3 (1:2,0:1,1:0)
- HC Olomouc - HC České Budějovice 2:5 (2:3,0:1,0:1)
- HC Olomouc - HC České Budějovice 2:10 (0:6,2:2,0:2)
- HC České Budějovice - HC Olomouc 5:3 (2:0,1:0,2:3)
- AC ZPS Zlín - HC Interconex Plzeň 2:1 PP (1:0,0:1,0:0,1:0)
- AC ZPS Zlín - HC Interconex Plzeň 3:1 (1:0,1:1,1:0)
- HC Interconex Plzeň - AC ZPS Zlín 3:4 (1:2,0:1,2:1)

=== Semifinal ===
- HC Dadák Vsetín - HC České Budějovice 3:1 (1:0,1:1,1:0)
- HC Dadák Vsetín - HC České Budějovice 3:2 PP (0:1,0:0,2:1,1:0)
- HC České Budějovice - HC Dadák Vsetín 2:4 (0:0,1:1,1:3)
- HC Kladno - AC ZPS Zlín 3:7 (1:1,1:2,1:4)
- HC Kladno - AC ZPS Zlín 3:2 (0:0,0:0,3:2)
- AC ZPS Zlín - HC Kladno 8:3 (3:1,3:0,2:2)
- AC ZPS Zlín - HC Kladno 3:4 SN (0:1,2:2,1:0,0:0)
- HC Kladno - AC ZPS Zlín 1:5 (1:2,0:1,0:2)

=== 3rd place ===
- HC České Budějovice - HC Kladno 5:3 (4:1,0:0,1:2)
- HC Kladno - HC České Budějovice 5:4 PP (3:2,1:1,0:1,1:0)
- HC Kladno - HC České Budějovice 3:4 PP (1:2,2:1,0:0,0:1)

=== Final ===
- HC Dadák Vsetín - AC ZPS Zlín 3-6, 2-1, 4-2, 2-1

HC Dadák Vsetín is 1994-95 Czech champion.

== Relegation ==
Place	Team	GP	W	T	L	Goals	Pts
9.	HC Sparta Praha	50	19	10	21	145 : 146	48
10.	HC Pardubice	50	17	12	21	158 : 169	46
11.	HC Vítkovice	50	19	6	25	163 : 184	44
12.	HC Dukla Jihlava	50	14	5	31	141 : 192	33
