= HC Tábor =

- City: Tábor, Czech Republic
- League: Czech 1.liga
- Founded: 1921
- Home arena: Zimní stadion Tábor
- Colours: Blue, White
- General manager: Tomáš Hamara
- Head coach: Richard Lobo

Franchise history
- 1921-1949: DSK Tábor
- 1949-1956: ČSSZ Tábor
- 1956-1960: Tatran Tábor
- 1960-1994: Vodní stavby Tábor
- 1994-present: HC Tábor

HC Tábor is an ice hockey team in Tábor, Czech Republic. They play in the Czech 1.liga, the second level of ice hockey in the Czech Republic. The club was founded in 1921.

== Achievements ==
- Czech 2.liga (West) champion: 2009, 2025.
