= KLH Vajgar Jindřichův Hradec =

- City: Jindřichův Hradec, Czech Republic
- League: South Bohemian regional championship
- Founded: 1929
- Home arena: Zimní stadion Jindřichův Hradec
- Colours: Yellow, Blue and White
- General manager: Miloslav Čech
- Head coach: František Joun
- Website: www.klhvajgar.cz

KLH Vajgar Jindřichův Hradec is an ice hockey team in Jindřichův Hradec, Czech Republic. They play in the South bohenian regionalchampionship, the fourth level of ice hockey in the Czech Republic.

== History ==
The club was founded as SRC Vajgar Jindřichův Hradec in 1929. They were known as TJ Slovan Jindřichův Hradec from 1950 to 2006. In 1993/1994, they played in the Czech Extraliga, but finished last and were relegated. In 2006, they changed their name to KLH Vajgar Jindřichův Hradec.

== Achievements ==
- Czech 1.liga champion: 1993.
- Czech 2.liga champion: 1989, 2003, 2004, 2005.
- Promoted to the Czech 1.liga: 2005.
