= IHC Písek =

IHC Králové Písek
- City: Písek, Czech Republic
- League: 2nd Czech Republic Hockey League
- Founded: 1990
- Home arena: Zimní stadion Písek
- Colours: Blue, Yellow

IHC Králové Písek is an ice hockey team in Písek, Czech Republic. They play in the Second Ice Hockey League, in the Czech Republic (third -level ice hockey league).

== History ==
IHC Písek was established in 1990. by merging the clubs VTJ Písek and JITEX Písek as VTJ JITEX Písek

In 1994, The club advanced to the Czech 1.liga, which he played until 2005. In the 2004-05 season, he failed in the blending playoffs and relegated to Czech 2.liga.

In the 2009-10 season, the club won promotion to the Czech 1.liga after 5 years.

Following season 2010-11 the team finished the last place after the superstructure part and unsuccessful play-off for the 1st league, where the whole team took the last 5th place and they relegated again. However the club bought a licence for 1st league from HC Vrchlabí.

After 2012-13 season played regional league.

He succeeded in the 2014-15 season. In the following two seasons, the Písek team always made it into second league elimination fights.

== Achievements ==
- Czech 2.liga champion: 1994.
