= BK Havlíčkův Brod =

- City: Havlíčkův Brod, Czech Republic
- League: Czech 2. liga
- Founded: 1928
- Home arena: Kotlina
- Colours: Red, White, Blue
- General manager: David Kozlík
- Head coach: Aleš Kraučuk
- Website: bkhb.cz/

Franchise history
- 1928-1990: Jiskra Havlíčkův Brod
- 1990-1998: BK Havlíčkův Brod
- 1998-2015: HC Rebel Havlíčkův Brod
- 2015: BK Havlíčkův Brod

BK Havlíčkův Brod (until 2015 known as HC Rebel Havlíčkův Brod) is an ice hockey team in Havlíčkův Brod, Czech Republic. Until the 2014-15 season, the club played in the Czech 1. Liga, however, the team was relegated to the Czech 2. liga at the end of the season. The club was founded in 1928.

== Achievements ==
- Czech 2.liga champion: 1993, 2006.
