= Královští Lvi =

Královští Lvi Hradec Králové
- City: Hradec Králové, Czech Republic
- League: Czech Jr. Extraliga
- Founded: 1926
- Home arena: Zimní Stadion Hradec Králové
- Colours: Red, Yellow, Black

Královští Lvi Hradec Králové is a junior ice hockey team from Hradec Králové, Czech Republic. The organization used to have a senior men's team which played in the Czech 1.liga, the second level of Czech ice hockey. The men's team dissolved in 2013 after HC České Budějovice sold the Extraliga license to the city of Hradec Králové. It was replaced by Mountfield HK. Královští Lvi still exists as a youth team of Mountfield HK, but it does not have a men's team.

== History ==
The club was founded as BK Hradec Králové in 1926. They have changed their name eight times in history:

- 1948 : Sokol Škoda Hradec Králové
- 1952 : Spartak Hradec Králové ZVÚ
- 1976 : TJ Stadion Hradec Králové
- 1992 : HC Stadion Hradec Králové
- 1994 : HC LEV Hradec Králové
- 2000 : HC Hradec Králové
- 2002 : HC VCES Hradec Králové
- 2012 : Královští Lvi Hradec Králové

== Achievements ==
- Czech 2.liga champion: 1978.
