= HC Berounští Medvědi =

- City: Beroun, Czech Republic
- League: Prague Regional League (4th tier)
- Founded: 1933
- Home arena: Zimní stadion Beroun
- Colours: Blue, Red, White

Franchise history
- 1933–1953: Český Lev Beroun
- 1953–1993: TJ Lokomotive Beroun
- 1993–1996: H + S Beroun HC
- 1996–present: HC Berounští Medvědi

HC Berounští Medvědi is an ice hockey team in Beroun, Czech Republic. It plays in the 4th tier.

== History ==
The club finished its almost 20-year-long run in the 1st Czech League in the 2013–14 season. Beroun was relegated to the Czech 2. liga at the end of that season. In 2014–2020, the team was inactive per orders from the Czech National Ice Hockey Federation, who have barred Beroun from entering the 2014-15 installment of the Czech 2. liga due to debt. From the 2020–21 season, the club plays in the 4th tier.

== Achievements ==
- Czech 2.liga champion: 1993.
- Czech 1.liga runner up: 2004.
