= HC Slezan Opava =

- City: Opava, Czech Republic
- League: Second National Hockey League
- Founded: 1945
- Home arena: Zimní stadion Opava
- Colours: red and white
- Head coach: Aleš Tomášek

HC Slezan Opava is an ice hockey team in the Second National Hockey League (third-level league) from Opava.

The club was founded in 1945. As soon as in 1951, Slezan was promoted to the Czechoslovak First Ice Hockey League and played there until 1953. Slezan Opava played in the top-level league also two seasons in 1957 and 1960. In the Czech Republic, the club was promoted to the elite Czech Extraliga in 1996, after it won the promotion play-offs. The club had financial difficulties and sold the license for Extraliga in 1999 to HC Havířov. From the 1999/2000 season the club played the First National Hockey League (second-level league) but was relegated in the 2004/2005 season to the Second National Hockey League (third-level league).

== Famous players ==
- David Hruška
- Drahomír Kadlec
- Libor Polášek
