= 2021–22 Czech 1. Liga season =

- League: (Czech Republic) Czech 1. liga
- Sport: Ice hockey
- Duration: 11 September 2021 – 2 March 2022; (Regular season)
- Games: 48
- Teams: 17

Regular season
- Season champions: Litoměřice

Playoffs

Finals
- Champions: Jihlava (4th title)
- Runners-up: Vsetín

Czech 1. Liga seasons
- 2020–21 2022–23

The 2021–22 Czech 1. liga season was the 29th season of the Czech 1. liga, the second level of ice hockey in the Czech Republic. 17 teams participated in the league.

== Regular season ==
=== Standings ===
Each team played 48 games, playing each of the other sixteen teams three times. Points were awarded for each game: three points for winning in regulation time, two for winning in overtime or shootout, one for losing in overtime or shootout, and zero points for losing in regulation time. At the end of the regular season, the team that finished with the most points was crowned the league champion.

Kadaň withdrew from the league in November 2021, having lost all of their 18 games played with a goal difference of 26 for and 89 against.

Pos	Team	Pld	W	OTW	OTL	L	GF	GA	GD	Pts	Qualification
1	Litoměřice	48	32	3	2	11	176	127	+49	104	Qualification to Quarter-finals
2	Vsetín	48	30	2	3	13	177	112	+65	97	Qualification to Quarter-finals
3	Třebíč	48	25	7	3	13	136	99	+37	92	Qualification to Quarter-finals
4	Jihlava	48	27	4	3	14	179	134	+45	92	Qualification to Quarter-finals
5	Přerov	48	21	7	5	15	143	105	+38	82	Qualification to Quarter-finals
6	Sokolov	48	22	5	3	18	150	133	+17	79	Qualification to Quarter-finals
7	Slavia Praha	48	20	7	4	17	157	139	+18	78	Qualification to Wild card round
8	Prostějov	48	22	3	5	18	162	145	+17	77	Qualification to Wild card round
9	Kolín	48	22	3	3	20	136	139	−3	75	Qualification to Wild card round
10	Frýdek-Místek	48	20	4	7	17	147	143	+4	75	Qualification to Wild card round
11	Vrchlabí	48	17	9	5	17	136	133	+3	74	
12	Poruba	48	18	6	8	16	148	133	+15	74	
13	Ústí nad Labem	48	17	6	7	18	135	154	−19	70	Qualification to Play Out
14	Šumperk	48	16	6	8	18	150	141	+9	68	Qualification to Play Out
15	Benátky nad Jizerou	48	15	0	3	30	118	153	−35	48	Relegated to Czech 2. Liga
16	Havířov	48	9	3	6	30	108	155	−47	39	Relegated to Czech 2. Liga
17	Kadaň	48	0	0	0	48	26	239	−213	0	Relegated to Czech 2. Liga

Source: Chance liga
Rules for classification: 1) Points; 2) Head-to-head points.

== Playoffs ==
Ten teams qualify for the playoffs: the top six teams in the regular season have a bye to the quarterfinals, while teams ranked seventh to tenth meet each other (7 versus 10, 8 versus 9) in a preliminary playoff round.

=== Bracket ===
Wild-card round (best-of-3)
7	Slavia Praha	2
10	Frýdek-Místek	1
8	Prostějov	2
9	Kolín	1

Quarter-finals (best-of-5)
2	Vsetín	3
7	Slavia Praha	2
1	Litoměřice	1
8	Prostějov	3
4	Jihlava	3
5	Přerov	2
3	Třebíč	1
6	Sokolov	3

Semi-finals (best-of-7)
2	Vsetín	4
8	Prostějov	1
(Pairings are re-seeded after the first and second round)
4	Jihlava	4
6	Sokolov	1

Finals (best-of-7)
2	Vsetín	2
4	Jihlava	4

=== Wild card round ===
Slavia Praha – Frýdek-Místek 2–1
05.03.2022	Frýdek-Místek	Slavia Praha	1-4
07.03.2022	Slavia Praha	Frýdek-Místek	0-3
08.03.2022	Slavia Praha	Frýdek-Místek	2-1
Slavia Praha won the series 2–1.

Prostějov – Kolín 2–1
05.03.2022	Kolín	Prostějov	1-2
07.03.2022	Prostějov	Kolín	1-5
08.03.2022	Prostějov	Kolín	2-0
Prostějov won the series 2–1.

=== Quarterfinals ===
Litoměřice – Prostějov 1–3
10.03.2022	Litoměřice	Prostějov	2-4
11.03.2022	Litoměřice	Prostějov	7-3
14.03.2022	Prostějov	Litoměřice	6-5
15.03.2022	Prostějov	Litoměřice	6-5 OT
Prostějov won the series 3–1.

Třebíč – Sokolov 1–3
10.03.2022	Třebíč	Sokolov	1-2
11.03.2022	Třebíč	Sokolov	4-2
14.03.2022	Sokolov	Třebíč	4-3 OT
15.03.2022	Sokolov	Třebíč	3-0
Sokolov won the series 3–1.

Vsetín – Slavia Praha 3–2
10.03.2022	Vsetín	Slavia Praha	1-2
11.03.2022	Vsetín	Slavia Praha	2-0
14.03.2022	Slavia Praha	Vsetín	5-3
15.03.2022	Slavia Praha	Vsetín	2-3 OT
17.03.2022	Vsetín	Slavia Praha	5-1
Vsetín won the series 3–2.

Jihlava – Přerov 3–2
10.03.2022	Jihlava	Přerov	0-2
11.03.2022	Jihlava	Přerov	1-0 OT
14.03.2022	Přerov	Jihlava	1-3
15.03.2022	Přerov	Jihlava	3-2 OT
17.03.2022	Jihlava	Přerov	2-1
Jihlava won the series 3–2.

=== Semifinals ===
Vsetín – Prostějov 4–1
20.03.2022	Vsetín	Prostějov	5-0
21.03.2022	Vsetín	Prostějov	5-1
24.03.2022	Prostějov	Vsetín	2-1 OT
25.03.2022	Prostějov	Vsetín	3-8
27.03.2022	Vsetín	Prostějov	8-2
Vsetín won the series 4–1.

Jihlava – Sokolov 4–1
20.03.2022	Jihlava	Sokolov	3-2 OT
21.03.2022	Jihlava	Sokolov	6-5 OT
24.03.2022	Sokolov	Jihlava	0-6
25.03.2022	Sokolov	Jihlava	4-2
27.03.2022	Jihlava	Sokolov	3-0
Jihlava won the series 4–1.

=== Finals ===
3 April 2022; 17:00 (UTC+2)	Vsetín	2–4 (0–1, 1–1, 1–2) score in the series: 0–1	Jihlava	Zimní stadion Na Lapači, Vsetín; Attendance: 5,030

Game reference

Jakub Málek
Goalies
Maksim Zhukov
Referees:
Tomáš Zubzanda
Jan Hucl
Linesmen:
Milan Jindra
Stanislav Hnát

	0–1	05:54 – Menšík (Chvátal, Havránek)
Zeman (Vlach) – 28:20	1–1
	1–2	30:29 – Kachyňa (Zadražil, Dundáček)
Hořanský (Březina, Vítek) – 43:16	2–2
	2–3	48:43 – Kowalczyk (Havránek, Skořepa)
	2–4	59:00 – Čachotský (Havránek, Skořepa)

4 min
Penalties
8 min
45
Shots
34

4 April 2022; 17:30 (UTC+2)	Vsetín	5–4 OT (2–1, 1–2, 1–1) (OT: 1–0) score in the series: 1–1	Jihlava	Zimní stadion Na Lapači, Vsetín; Attendance: 4,020

Game reference

Jakub Málek
Goalies
Maksim Zhukov
Referees:
Robert Čech
Tomáš Cabák
Linesmen:
Roman Zídek
Roman Komínek

Ondračka (Zeman, Berger) – 08:10	1–0
	1–1	10:33 – Skořepa
Zeman (Berger, Štach) – 13:25	2–1
	2–2	20:21 – Havránek (SH1)
	2–3	34:26 – Skořepa (SH2)
Říha (Vlach) (PP2) – 35:37	3–3
Říha (Rob, Venkrbec) – 45:33	4–3
	4–4	59:45 – Bilčík (Skořepa, Havránek)
Vlach – 68:57	5–4

8 min
Penalties
18 min
45
Shots
18

7 April 2022; 17:30 (UTC+2)	Jihlava	3–4 (1–2, 1–2, 1–0) score in the series: 1–2	Vsetín	Horácký zimní stadion, Jihlava; Attendance: 3,034

Game reference

Maksim Zhukov
Goalies
David Gába
Referees:
Tomáš Zubzanda
Luděk Pilný
Linesmen:
Milan Štofa
Václav Beneš

	0–1	04:00 - Zeman (Berger, Říha)
	0–2	05:01 - Jonák (Smetana, Březina)
Helt (Zadražil) - 17:34	1–2
	1–3	22:43 - Venkrbec (Březina, Smetana) (PP1)
Skořepa (Čachotský) - 24:27	2–3
	2–4	34:41 - Venkrbec (Jonák)
Čachotský (Helt, Havránek) - 59:59	3–4

25 min
Penalties
10 min
21
Shots
19

8 April 2022; 17:30 (UTC+2)	Jihlava	2–0 (1–0, 0–0, 1–0) score in the series: 2–2	Vsetín	Horácký zimní stadion, Jihlava; Attendance: 4,149

Game reference
Maksim Zhukov	Goalies	David Gába	Referees: Radek Wagner; Miroslav Petružálek; Linesmen: David Polonyi; Martin Kreuzer
Seman (Brož, Menšík) - 01:36 / 1–0; Čachotský - 57:36 / 2–0			Referees: Radek Wagner; Miroslav Petružálek; Linesmen: David Polonyi; Martin Kreuzer
15 min	Penalties	19 min	Referees: Radek Wagner; Miroslav Petružálek; Linesmen: David Polonyi; Martin Kreuzer
35	Shots	31	Referees: Radek Wagner; Miroslav Petružálek; Linesmen: David Polonyi; Martin Kreuzer

10 April 2022; 17:00 (UTC+2)	Vsetín	3–6 (0–4, 1–1, 2–1) score in the series: 2–3	Jihlava	Zimní stadion Na Lapači, Vsetín; Attendance: 5,050

Game reference

David Gába
Jakub Málek
Goalies
Maksim Zhukov
Referees:
Miroslav Petružálek
Tomáš Zubzanda
Linesmen:
Milan Jindra
Roman Komínek

	0–1	02:56 - Juda
	0–2	09:57 - Eliáš (Čermák, Juda)
	0–3	16:05 - Kachyňa (Brož, Havránek) (PP1)
	0–4	17:03 - Čermák (Valenta, Cachnín)
Smetana - 27:47	1–4
	1–5	35:48 - Menšík (Bilčík, Seman)
Ondračka (Klímek, Březina) - 41:59	2–5
Smetana (Klímek, Březina) (PP1) - 43:23	3–5
	3–6	59:28 - Čachotský (Dundáček)

4 min
Penalties
12 min
45
Shots
27

12 April 2022; 17:30 (UTC+2)	Jihlava	1–0 (1–0, 0–0, 0–0) score in the series: 4–2	Vsetín	Horácký zimní stadion, Jihlava; Attendance: 5,024

Game reference
Maksim Zhukov	Goalies	David Gába	Referees: Vladimír Pešina; Radek Wagner; Linesmen: Roman Zídek; David Polonyi
Seman (Menšík, Brož) - 17:47 / 1–0			Referees: Vladimír Pešina; Radek Wagner; Linesmen: Roman Zídek; David Polonyi
4 min	Penalties	6 min	Referees: Vladimír Pešina; Radek Wagner; Linesmen: Roman Zídek; David Polonyi
40	Shots	22	Referees: Vladimír Pešina; Radek Wagner; Linesmen: Roman Zídek; David Polonyi

== Relegation ==
=== Play-down ===
Ústí nad Labem – Šumperk 1–4
9.03.2022	Ústí nad Labem	Šumperk	5-2
10.03.2022	Ústí nad Labem	Šumperk	0-1
13.03.2022	Šumperk	Ústí nad Labem	4-3
14.03.2022	Šumperk	Ústí nad Labem	2-0
17.03.2022	Ústí nad Labem	Šumperk	2-3
Šumperk won the series 4–1 and will play against the winner of 2. Liga. Ústí nad Labem is relegated.

=== Play-off vs. 2. Liga winner ===
Šumperk – Tábor 4–1
13.04.2022	Šumperk	Tábor	6-4
14.04.2022	Šumperk	Tábor	5-2
17.04.2022	Tábor	Šumperk	5-4
18.04.2022	Tábor	Šumperk	1-3
21.04.2022	Šumperk	Tábor	3-0
Šumperk won the series 4–1 and therefore remained in 1. Liga for the next season.

== Final rankings ==
Gold medal	Jihlava
Silver medal	Vsetín
Bronze medal	Sokolov
4	Prostějov
5	Litoměřice
6	Třebíč
7	Přerov
8	Slavia Praha
9	Kolín
10	Frýdek-Místek
11	Vrchlabí
12	Poruba
13	Šumperk
14	Ústí nad Labem
15	Benátky nad Jizerou
16	Havířov
17	Kadaň
