= 2012–13 2. národní hokejová liga season =

The 2012–13 2. národní hokejová liga season was the 20th season of the 2nd Czech Republic Hockey League, the third level of ice hockey in the Czech Republic. 30 teams participated in the league, and VSK Technika Brno, AZ Havířov, and HC Tábor qualified for the qualification round of the 1st Czech Republic Hockey League.

== Regular season ==
=== Group: Center ===
Pl.		GP	W	OTW	OTL	L	Goals	Pts
1.	SHK Hodonín	36	27	3	3	3	215:103	90
2.	VSK Technika Brno	36	19	4	2	11	154:111	67
3.	SKLH Žďár nad Sázavou	36	20	3	0	13	158:127	66
4.	SC Kolín	36	20	1	3	12	149:121	65
5.	NED Hockey Nymburk	36	16	4	5	11	133:134	61
6.	HC Lední Medvědi Pelhřimov	36	13	4	7	12	146:158	54
7.	HC Lvi Břeclav	36	16	1	3	16	154:133	53
8.	HC Moravské Budějovice 2005	36	9	5	1	21	105:141	38
9.	KLH Vajgar Jindřichův Hradec	36	9	2	1	24	120:158	32
10.	HC Chotěboř	36	4	0	2	30	103:251	14

=== Group: East ===
Pl.		GP	W	OTW	OTL	L	Goals	Pts
1.	HC ZUBR Přerov	42	23	8	2	9	150:103	87
2.	AZ Havířov	42	24	4	5	9	166:100	85
3.	LHK Jestřábi Prostějov	42	18	5	4	15	152:148	68
4.	HC RT Torax Poruba	42	18	3	5	16	138:124	65
5.	VHK Vsetín	42	19	3	1	19	142:133	64
6.	SK Karviná	42	16	5	6	15	153:150	64
7.	HC Slezan Opava	42	16	3	5	18	138:144	59
8.	HC Nový Jičín	42	16	4	1	21	126:130	57
9.	HC Frýdek-Místek	42	13	4	5	20	132:165	52
10.	HC Bobři Valašské Meziříčí	42	5	3	8	26	117:217	29

=== Group: West ===
Pl.		GP	W	OTW	OTL	L	Goals	Pts
1.	HC Tábor	36	20	3	5	8	164:117	71
2.	HC Řisuty	36	20	3	1	12	148:110	67
3.	HC Děčín	36	20	1	1	14	160:138	63
4.	SHC Klatovy	36	18	1	1	16	133:132	57
5.	HC Klášterec nad Ohří	36	16	2	4	14	136:128	56
6.	HC Baník Sokolov	36	14	3	4	15	127:145	52
7.	HC Kobra Praha	36	15	0	6	15	139:147	51
8.	HC Vlci Jablonec nad Nisou	36	11	4	3	18	136:159	44
9.	HC Draci Bílina	36	9	7	2	18	123:151	43
10.	HC Milevsko 2010	36	9	4	1	22	119:158	36

== Playoffs ==
=== Group: Center ===
Quarter-finals
SHK Hodonín	3
HC Moravské Budějovice 2005	0
SC Kolín	3
NED Hockey Nymburk	2
VSK Technika Brno	3
HC Lvi Břeclav	2
SKLH Žďár nad Sázavou	3
HC Lední Medvědi Pelhřimov	0

Semi-finals
SHK Hodonín	3
SC Kolín	1
VSK Technika Brno	3
SKLH Žďár nad Sázavou	0

Final
SHK Hodonín	2
VSK Technika Brno	3

VSK Technika Brno proceeded directly to the qualification round of the 1st Czech Republic Hockey League after winning their final series. They qualified for the 1st Czech Republic Hockey League.

=== Group: East ===
Quarter-finals
HC ZUBR Přerov	3
HC Nový Jičín	0
LHK Jestřábi Prostějov	0
SK Karviná	3
AZ Havířov	3
HC Slezan Opava	1
HC RT Torax Poruba	3
VHK Vsetín	0

Semi-finals
HC ZUBR Přerov	2
SK Karviná	3
AZ Havířov	3
HC RT Torax Poruba	1

Final
SK Karviná	2
AZ Havířov	3

AZ Havířov proceeded directly to the qualification round of the 1st Czech Republic Hockey League after winning their final series. They qualified for the 1st Czech Republic Hockey League.

=== Group: West ===
Quarter-finals
HC Tábor	3
HC Vlci Jablonec nad Nisou	0
HC Děčín	2
HC Baník Sokolov	3
HC Řisuty	3
HC Kobra Praha	2
SHC Klatovy	2
HC Klášterec nad Ohří	3

Semi-finals
HC Tábor	3
HC Baník Sokolov	1
HC Řisuty	3
HC Klášterec nad Ohří	0

Final
HC Tábor	3
HC Řisuty	1

HC Tábor proceeded directly to the qualification round of the 1st Czech Republic Hockey League after winning their final series. They qualified for the 1st Czech Republic Hockey League.

== 2. Liga Promotion - Qualification ==
=== Group A ===
Pl.		GP	W	T	L	Goals	Pts
1.	HC Slavoj Zbraslav (Prague champion)	4	3	0	1	23:13	6
2.	HC Slovan Louny (Usti champion)	4	2	0	2	16:19	4
3.	HC Slavoj Velké Popovice (Central Bohemian champion)	4	1	0	3	15:22	2

=== Group B ===
Pl.		GP	W	T	L	Goals	Pts
1.	HC Stadion Vrchlabí (Hradec Kralove champion)	6	4	2	0	38:17	10
2.	HC Spartak Choceň (Pardubice champion)	6	3	1	1	34:31	7
3.	TJ Lokomotiva Veselí nad Lužnicí (South Bohemian champion)	6	2	0	3	28:25	4
4.	HC Rebel město Nejdek (Karlovy Vary champion)	6	0	1	4	17:44	1

=== Group C ===
HC Orlová (Moravian champion) won Group C automatically as the winners of the South Moravian and Zlin regional championships declined to participate.

== 2. Liga Promotion ==
=== West ===
- HC Milevsko 2010 - HC Slavoj Zbraslav 9:2 (4:0, 2:0, 3:2)
- HC Slavoj Zbraslav - HC Milevsko 2010 3:5 (2:3, 1:1, 0:1)

=== Central ===
- HC Lvi Chotěboř - HC Stadion Vrchlabí 3:5 (0:2, 3:1, 0:2)
- HC Stadion Vrchlabí - HC Lvi Chotěboř 7:3 (1:2, 3:1 3:0)

=== East ===
- HC Bobři Valašské Meziříčí - HC Orlová 3:4 (OT) (1:0, 2:2, 0:1 - 0:1)
- HC Orlová - HC Bobři Valašské Meziříčí 0:7 (0:0, 0:4, 0:3)
- HC Bobři Valašské Meziříčí - HC Orlová 3:2 (1:2, 1:0, 1:0)
