= Petr Štindl =

Czech ice hockey player

- Born: March 7, 1990 (age 36) Vsetín, Czechoslovakia
- Height: 6 ft 0 in (183 cm)
- Weight: 194 lb (88 kg; 13 st 12 lb)
- Position: Defence
- Shot: Left
- Played for: VHK Vsetín; HC Nový Jičín; HC Kometa Brno; HK Dukla Trencin; VSK Technika Brno; HC Havlíčkův Brod; HC Litvínov; SK Horácká Slavia Třebíč; HC Nove Zamky; LHK Jestřábi Prostějov; Rytíři Kladno; HC Dukla Jihlava; HC Dynamo Pardubice; Mountfield HK
- Playing career: 2008–2019

Petr Štindl (born March 7, 1990) is a Czech professional ice hockey defenceman. He played with HC Kometa Brno in the Czech Extraliga during the 2010–11 Czech Extraliga playoffs.

== Career statistics ==
| | | | Regular season | | | | | Playoffs |
| Season | Team | League | GP | G | A | Pts | PIM | GP | G | A | Pts | PIM |
|---|---|---|---|---|---|---|---|---|---|---|---|---|
| 2005–06 | HC Novy Jicin U18 | Czech U18 2 | — | — | — | — | — | — | — | — | — | — |
| 2006–07 | HC Vsetin U18 | Czech U18 | 41 | 5 | 7 | 12 | 58 | 3 | 0 | 0 | 0 | 12 |
| 2007–08 | HC Znojemsti Orli U20 | Czech U20 | 25 | 1 | 3 | 4 | 42 | — | — | — | — | — |
| 2007–08 | Vsetínská hokejová U20 | Czech U20 | 13 | 1 | 3 | 4 | 12 | 2 | 0 | 0 | 0 | 2 |
| 2008–09 | VHK Vsetín U20 | Czech U20 | 16 | 0 | 0 | 0 | 22 | — | — | — | — | — |
| 2008–09 | VHK Vsetín | Czech3 | 1 | 0 | 0 | 0 | 4 | — | — | — | — | — |
| 2008–09 | HC Nový Jičín U20 | Czech U20 2 | 6 | 0 | 2 | 2 | 8 | — | — | — | — | — |
| 2008–09 | HC Nový Jičín | Czech3 | 22 | 0 | 7 | 7 | 34 | 2 | 0 | 2 | 2 | 2 |
| 2009–10 | HC Kometa Brno U20 | Czech U20 | 50 | 8 | 16 | 24 | 62 | 2 | 0 | 1 | 1 | 4 |
| 2010–11 | HC Kometa Brno U20 | Czech U20 | 53 | 4 | 19 | 23 | 77 | — | — | — | — | — |
| 2011–12 | HK Dukla Trencin | Slovak | 51 | 0 | 3 | 3 | 16 | 1 | 0 | 0 | 0 | 2 |
| 2012–13 | VSK Technika Brno | Czech3 | 17 | 1 | 4 | 5 | 18 | 8 | 2 | 0 | 2 | 6 |
| 2013–14 | VSK Technika Brno | Czech3 | 42 | 11 | 17 | 28 | 34 | 4 | 0 | 1 | 1 | 0 |
| 2014–15 | VSK Technika Brno | Czech3 | 22 | 9 | 7 | 16 | 24 | — | — | — | — | — |
| 2014–15 | HC Havlíčkův Brod | Czech2 | 8 | 3 | 0 | 3 | 2 | — | — | — | — | — |
| 2014–15 | HC Litvínov | Czech | 18 | 2 | 1 | 3 | 14 | 6 | 0 | 1 | 1 | 6 |
| 2015–16 | HC Kometa Brno | Czech | 23 | 1 | 1 | 2 | 4 | — | — | — | — | — |
| 2015–16 | SK Horácká Slavia Třebíč | Czech2 | 27 | 0 | 5 | 5 | 10 | — | — | — | — | — |
| 2016–17 | HC Nove Zamky | Slovak | 9 | 0 | 1 | 1 | 12 | — | — | — | — | — |
| 2016–17 | LHK Jestřábi Prostějov | Czech2 | 16 | 2 | 1 | 3 | 4 | 4 | 0 | 1 | 1 | 2 |
| 2017–18 | Rytíři Kladno | Czech2 | 45 | 5 | 17 | 22 | 22 | 11 | 1 | 4 | 5 | 6 |
| 2018–19 | HC Dukla Jihlava | Czech2 | 44 | 3 | 9 | 12 | 30 | — | — | — | — | — |
| 2018–19 | HC Dynamo Pardubice | Czech | 3 | 0 | 1 | 1 | 4 | — | — | — | — | — |
| 2018–19 | Mountfield HK | Czech | 7 | 1 | 1 | 2 | 4 | 3 | 0 | 0 | 0 | 0 |
| Czech totals | | | 51 | 4 | 4 | 8 | 26 | 9 | 0 | 1 | 1 | 6 |
| Slovak totals | | | 60 | 0 | 4 | 4 | 28 | 1 | 0 | 0 | 0 | 2 |
| Czech2 totals | | | 140 | 13 | 32 | 45 | 68 | 15 | 1 | 5 | 6 | 8 |
| Czech3 totals | | | 104 | 21 | 35 | 56 | 114 | 14 | 2 | 3 | 5 | 8 |
