= Patrik Husák =

Czech ice hockey player

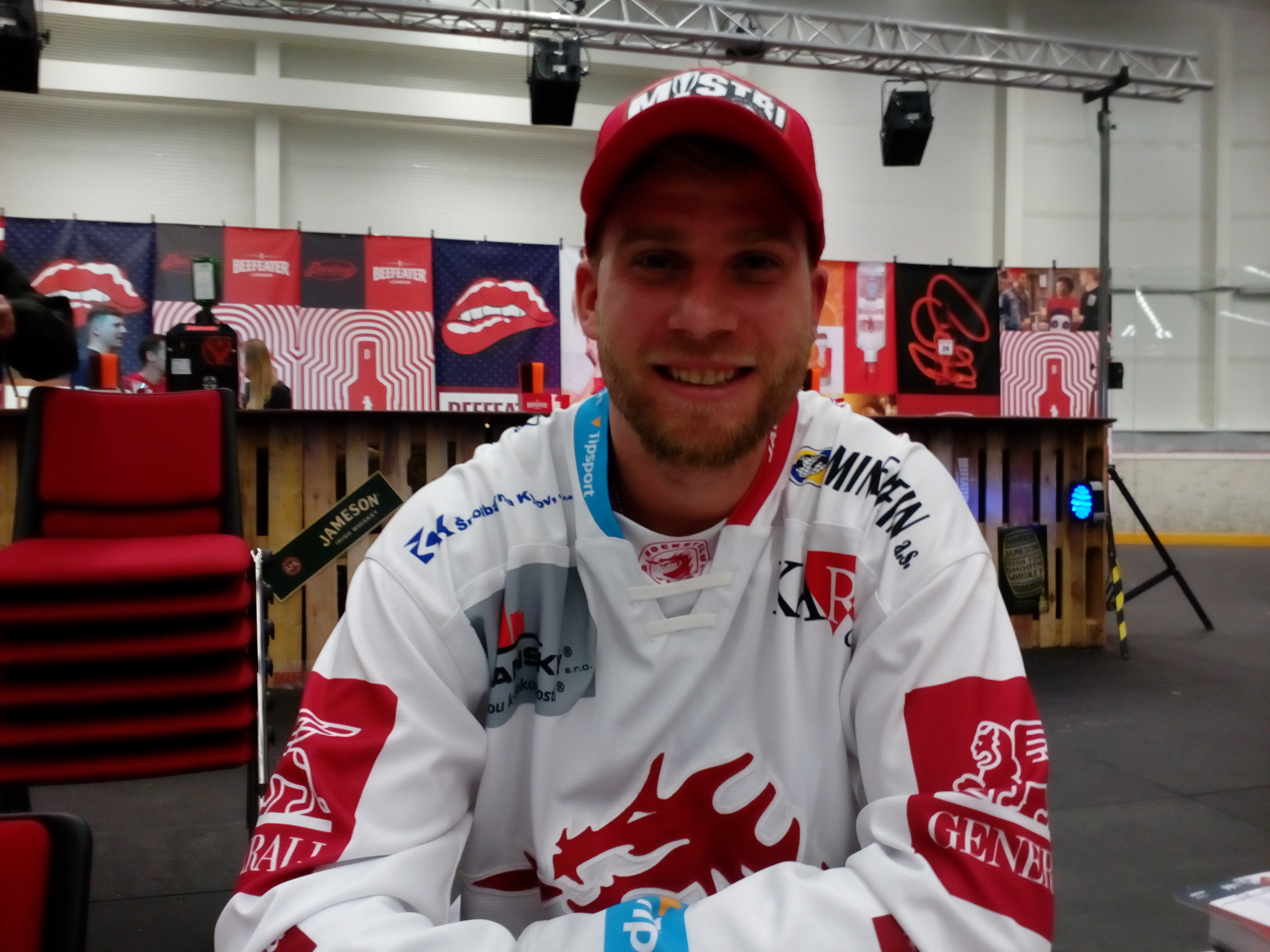
- By the end of the season 2018/19 on the wedding in the house (training) Werk Areně
- Born: April 23, 1990 (age 34); Kralupy nad Vltavou, Czechoslovakia
- Height: 6 ft 2 in (188 cm)
- Weight: 179 lb (81 kg; 12 st 11 lb)
- Position: Defence
- Shoots: Left
- Czech 1. Liga team Former teams: HC RT Torax Poruba; HC Sparta Praha; HK Dukla Trenčín; HC Nové Zámky; HC Oceláři Třinec
- Playing career: 2010–present

Patrik Husak (born April 23, 1990) is a Czech professional ice hockey defenceman currently playing for HC RT Torax Poruba of the Czech 1. Liga.

He played with HC Sparta Praha in the Czech Extraliga during the 2010–11 Czech Extraliga season.

== Career statistics ==
| | | | Regular season | | | | | Playoffs |
| Season | Team | League | GP | G | A | Pts | PIM | GP | G | A | Pts | PIM |
|---|---|---|---|---|---|---|---|---|---|---|---|---|
| 2008–09 | SC Kolin | Czech3 | 3 | 0 | 0 | 0 | 2 | 2 | 1 | 0 | 1 | 0 |
| 2009–10 | HC Jablonec | Czech3 | 3 | 1 | 0 | 1 | 8 | — | — | — | — | — |
| 2010–11 | HC Sparta Praha | Czech | 16 | 0 | 1 | 1 | 4 | 11 | 0 | 0 | 0 | 12 |
| 2010–11 | HC Berounsti Medvedi | Czech2 | 31 | 2 | 2 | 4 | 14 | — | — | — | — | — |
| 2011–12 | HC Sparta Praha | Czech | 27 | 0 | 1 | 1 | 8 | 2 | 0 | 0 | 0 | 0 |
| 2011–12 | HC Berounsti Medvedi | Czech2 | 15 | 0 | 6 | 6 | 26 | 1 | 0 | 0 | 0 | 2 |
| 2011–12 | HC Slovan Ústečtí Lvi | Czech2 | 6 | 0 | 0 | 0 | 0 | — | — | — | — | — |
| 2012–13 | HC Sparta Praha | Czech | 6 | 0 | 1 | 1 | 0 | — | — | — | — | — |
| 2012–13 | HC Litomerice | Czech2 | 45 | 7 | 11 | 18 | 46 | 6 | 1 | 3 | 4 | 2 |
| 2013–14 | HC Litomerice | Czech2 | 48 | 3 | 4 | 7 | 64 | 6 | 0 | 0 | 0 | 0 |
| 2014–15 | HK Dukla Trencin | Slovak | 13 | 0 | 0 | 0 | 18 | — | — | — | — | — |
| 2014–15 | LHK Jestřábi Prostějov | Czech2 | 32 | 1 | 14 | 15 | 54 | 6 | 1 | 2 | 3 | 6 |
| 2015–16 | LHK Jestřábi Prostějov | Czech2 | 51 | 3 | 18 | 21 | 115 | 4 | 0 | 0 | 0 | 4 |
| Czech totals | | | 49 | 0 | 3 | 3 | 12 | 13 | 0 | 0 | 0 | 12 |
| Czech2 totals | | | 232 | 16 | 55 | 71 | 319 | 23 | 2 | 5 | 7 | 14 |
