= Marek Sikora (ice hockey) =

Czech ice hockey player

- Born: December 29, 1986 (age 38); Havířov, Czechoslovakia
- Height: 6 ft 2 in (188 cm)
- Weight: 214 lb (97 kg; 15 st 4 lb)
- Position: Centre
- Shot: Right
- Czech Extraliga team: Piráti Chomutov
- NHL draft: Undrafted
- Playing career: 2006–2021

Marek Sikora (born December 29, 1986) is a former Czech professional ice hockey player.

Sikora made his Czech Extraliga debut playing with Piráti Chomutov debut during the 2012–13 Czech Extraliga season.

== Career statistics ==
			Regular season					Playoffs
Season	Team	League	GP	G	A	Pts	PIM	GP	G	A	Pts	PIM
2001–02	HC Havirov U18	Czech U18	46	11	7	18	62	—	—	—	—	—
2002–03	HC Havirov U18	Czech U18	47	22	24	46	151	—	—	—	—	—
2002–03	HC Havířov Panthers U20	Czech U20	2	0	0	0	0	—	—	—	—	—
2003–04	HC Havířov Panthers U20	Czech U20	17	0	4	4	4	—	—	—	—	—
2004–05	HC Havířov Panthers U20	Czech U20	46	11	6	17	56	3	1	0	1	0
2005–06	HC Havířov Panthers U20	Czech U20	20	9	12	21	61	—	—	—	—	—
2005–06	HC RT Torax Poruba U20	Czech U20	18	4	7	11	40	—	—	—	—	—
2006–07	HC Havířov Panthers	Czech2	44	3	5	8	34	—	—	—	—	—
2006–07	HC Orlová	Czech3	1	1	0	1	4	—	—	—	—	—
2007–08	HC RT Torax Poruba	Czech2	9	0	1	1	6	—	—	—	—	—
2007–08	HC Havířov Panthers	Czech2	26	2	4	6	20	4	1	0	1	4
2007–08	HC Orlová	Czech3	7	3	2	5	4	—	—	—	—	—
2008–09	HC Havířov Panthers	Czech2	44	11	13	24	77	3	1	1	2	2
2009–10	HC Havířov Panthers	Czech2	27	11	8	19	50	—	—	—	—	—
2009–10	SK Kadaň	Czech2	2	0	1	1	2	9	3	3	6	6
2010–11	KLH Chomutov	Czech2	28	4	14	18	18	11	5	1	6	16
2010–11	SK Kadaň	Czech2	9	7	1	8	14	—	—	—	—	—
2011–12	Piráti Chomutov	Czech2	48	14	14	28	50	19	2	3	5	14
2012–13	Piráti Chomutov	Czech	49	4	6	10	34	—	—	—	—	—
2013–14	Piráti Chomutov	Czech	37	1	3	4	59	—	—	—	—	—
2013–14	SK Kadaň	Czech2	1	0	0	0	0	—	—	—	—	—
2014–15	Piráti Chomutov	Czech2	12	2	3	5	4	4	0	0	0	2
2014–15	SK Kadaň	Czech2	11	2	8	10	8	—	—	—	—	—
2015–16	HC Přerov	Czech2	50	17	19	36	70	5	0	0	0	8
2016–17	HC Přerov	Czech2	47	14	17	31	30	8	2	1	3	8
2017–18	AZ Havířov	Czech2	42	7	21	28	50	5	0	0	0	4
2018–19	HC Přerov	Czech2	55	10	16	26	38	5	0	2	2	2
2019–20	HC Poruba 2011	Czech2	57	16	26	42	36	2	0	1	1	2
2020–21	HC Poruba 2011	Czech2	25	6	8	14	12	9	0	0	0	2
Czech totals			86	5	9	14	93	—	—	—	—	—
Czech2 totals			537	126	179	305	519	84	14	12	26	70
