= Lukáš Špelda =

Czech ice hockey player

- Born: 6 January 1985 (age 41) Mělník, Czechoslovakia
- Height: 6 ft 0 in (183 cm)
- Weight: 190 lb (86 kg; 13 st 8 lb)
- Position: Defence
- Shot: Left
- team Former teams: Free agent HC Slavia Praha
- Playing career: 2003–2020

Lukáš Špelda (born 6 January 1985) is a Czech professional ice hockey defenceman.

Špelda played a total of 121 games in the Czech Extraliga for HC Slavia Praha. He also for HC Kometa Brno and HC Havlíčkův Brod as well in the Ligue Magnus for Aigles de Nice.

== Career statistics ==
			Regular season					Playoffs
Season	Team	League	GP	G	A	Pts	PIM	GP	G	A	Pts	PIM
1999–00	HC Slavia Praha U18	Czech U18	36	0	2	2	10	—	—	—	—	—
2000–01	HC Slavia Praha U18	Czech U18	45	4	6	10	72	7	0	1	1	10
2001–02	HC Slavia Praha U18	Czech U18	28	4	6	10	45	—	—	—	—	—
2001–02	HC Slavia Praha U20	Czech U20	2	0	0	0	2	—	—	—	—	—
2002–03	HC Slavia Praha U20	Czech U20	43	1	8	9	50	3	0	0	0	4
2002–03	HC Slavia Praha	Czech	5	0	0	0	0	2	0	0	0	0
2003–04	HC Slavia Praha U20	Czech U20	44	7	4	11	156	—	—	—	—	—
2003–04	HC Most	Czech3	4	0	2	2	0	7	1	1	2	6
2004–05	HC Slavia Praha U20	Czech U20	7	0	3	3	44	—	—	—	—	—
2004–05	SK Kadaň	Czech2	41	0	6	6	48	—	—	—	—	—
2005–06	HC Kometa Brno U20	Czech U20	15	2	10	12	22	—	—	—	—	—
2005–06	HC Kometa Brno	Czech2	30	1	4	5	26	4	0	0	0	0
2006–07	HC Kometa Brno	Czech2	44	2	6	8	60	—	—	—	—	—
2006–07	SHK Hodonín	Czech3	2	0	0	0	6	11	3	1	4	16
2006–07	HC Spartak Velká Bíteš	Czech3	1	1	0	1	4	—	—	—	—	—
2007–08	Draci Šumperk	Czech2	37	3	6	9	58	—	—	—	—	—
2008–09	HC Slavia Praha	Czech	22	1	4	5	28	5	0	0	0	0
2008–09	HC Havlíčkův Brod	Czech2	29	2	3	5	46	—	—	—	—	—
2009–10	HC Slavia Praha	Czech	33	1	0	1	10	2	0	0	0	0
2009–10	HC Havlíčkův Brod	Czech2	8	1	0	1	6	5	0	0	0	0
2010–11	HC Slavia Praha	Czech	40	0	1	1	30	2	0	0	0	4
2011–12	HC Slavia Praha	Czech	8	0	0	0	4	—	—	—	—	—
2011–12	HC Berounští Medvědi	Czech2	42	2	10	12	46	—	—	—	—	—
2012–13	HC Slovan Ústečtí Lvi	Czech2	37	1	6	7	28	7	0	2	2	4
2013–14	HC Berounští Medvědi	Czech2	39	1	3	4	78	—	—	—	—	—
2014–15	HC Stadion Litoměřice	Czech2	49	2	8	10	64	3	0	0	0	0
2015–16	Nice hockey Côte d'Azur	France2	25	6	10	16	40	9	1	1	2	26
2016–17	Nice hockey Côte d'Azur	Ligue Magnus	44	2	12	14	50	—	—	—	—	—
2017–18	Nice hockey Côte d'Azur	Ligue Magnus	25	3	9	12	34	—	—	—	—	—
2018–19	Vipers de Montpellier	France2	3	1	2	3	4	—	—	—	—	—
2019–20	HC Čáslav	Czech4	17	7	7	14	14	5	2	8	10	4
Czech totals			108	2	5	7	72	11	0	0	0	2
Czech2 totals			356	15	52	67	460	19	0	2	2	4
