= Jan Hlaváč =

Czech ice hockey player

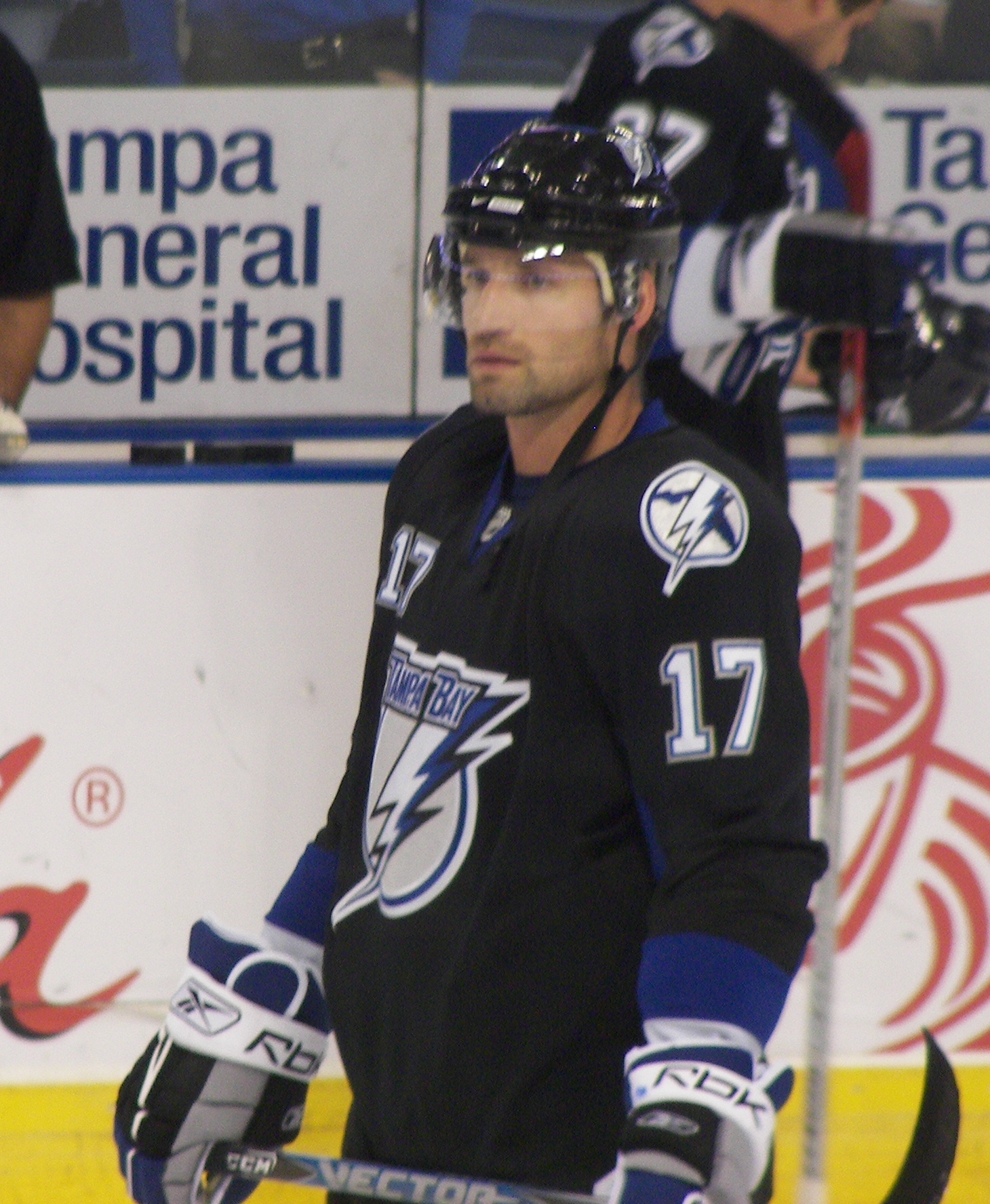
- Hlaváč with the Tampa Bay Lightning in 2007
- Born: September 19, 1976 (age 49) Prague, Czechoslovakia
- Height: 6 ft 0 in (183 cm)
- Weight: 200 lb (91 kg; 14 st 4 lb)
- Position: Left wing
- Shot: Left
- Played for: Sparta Praha; New York Rangers; Philadelphia Flyers; Vancouver Canucks; Carolina Hurricanes; Genève-Servette; Tampa Bay Lightning; Nashville Predators; Linköpings; Bílí Tygři Liberec; Kladno; Växjö Lakers
- National team: Czech Republic
- NHL draft: 28th overall, 1995; New York Islanders
- Playing career: 1994–2017

Jan Hlaváč (born September 19, 1976) is a Czech former professional ice hockey player who last played for HC Stadion Vrchlabí in CZE.3.

== Playing career ==
Hlaváč has played at the National Hockey League level for the New York Rangers, Philadelphia Flyers, Vancouver Canucks, Carolina Hurricanes, Tampa Bay Lightning and Nashville Predators. His first stint with the Rangers saw him play on the Czech-mate line with countrymen Radek Dvořák and Petr Nedvěd.

He scored 19 goals and 42 points in 1999–2000, his rookie season, and he scored an NHL career high 28 goals and 64 points in 2000–01. He was unable to duplicate his early success in Philadelphia, Vancouver, and Carolina and returned to Europe following a second stint with New York in 2003–04.

After 3 seasons in Europe, Hlaváč returned to the NHL for the 2007–08 NHL season as a member of the Tampa Bay Lightning, scoring 22 points in 62 games before being traded to the Nashville Predators. Hlaváč had decent success with Nashville, scoring 3 goals and 10 assists for 13 points in just 18 games. Hlaváč became an unrestricted free agent after the Predators decided not to retain him on July 1. In August, he signed a one-year contract with Linköpings HC of Swedish Elitserien.

== Career statistics ==
=== Regular season and playoffs ===
			Regular season					Playoffs
Season	Team	League	GP	G	A	Pts	PIM	GP	G	A	Pts	PIM
1991–92	HC Sparta Praha	CSR U18	29	28	14	42	—	—	—	—	—	—
1992–93	HC Sparta Praha	CSR U18	13	6	9	15	—	—	—	—	—	—
1992–93	HC Sparta Praha	CSR U20	34	8	9	17	—	—	—	—	—	—
1993–94	HC Sparta Praha	CZE U20	27	12	15	27	—	—	—	—	—	—
1993–94	HC Sparta Praha	ELH	8	1	1	2	2	—	—	—	—	—
1994–95	HC Sparta Praha	CZE U20	2	1	0	1	24	—	—	—	—	—
1994–95	HC Sparta Praha	ELH	38	7	6	13	6	—	—	—	—	—
1995–96	HC Sparta Praha	ELH	34	7	7	14	14	11	1	2	3	8
1996–97	HC Sparta Praha	ELH	34	8	10	18	18	10	5	2	7	2
1996–97	HC Becherovka Karlovy Vary	CZE.2	2	0	1	1	—	—	—	—	—	—
1997–98	HC Sparta Praha	ELH	46	17	30	47	58	5	1	0	1	0
1998–99	HC Sparta Praha	ELH	47	32	18	50	52	6	1	3	4	4
1999–00	Hartford Wolf Pack	AHL	3	1	0	1	0	—	—	—	—	—
1999–00	New York Rangers	NHL	67	19	23	42	16	—	—	—	—	—
2000–01	New York Rangers	NHL	79	28	36	64	20	—	—	—	—	—
2001–02	Philadelphia Flyers	NHL	31	7	3	10	8	—	—	—	—	—
2001–02	Vancouver Canucks	NHL	46	9	12	21	10	5	0	1	1	0
2002–03	Vancouver Canucks	NHL	9	1	1	2	6	—	—	—	—	—
2002–03	Carolina Hurricanes	NHL	52	9	15	24	22	—	—	—	—	—
2003–04	New York Rangers	NHL	72	5	21	26	15	—	—	—	—	—
2004–05	HC Sparta Praha	ELH	48	10	28	38	34	5	2	0	2	6
2005–06	Genève–Servette HC	NLA	42	12	22	34	28	—	—	—	—	—
2006–07	HC Sparta Praha	ELH	41	20	11	31	85	16	8	2	10	16
2007–08	Tampa Bay Lightning	NHL	62	9	13	22	32	—	—	—	—	—
2007–08	Nashville Predators	NHL	18	3	10	13	8	6	0	2	2	2
2008–09	Linköping HC	SEL	54	25	23	48	28	5	3	1	4	0
2009–10	Bílí Tygři Liberec	ELH	19	8	9	17	12	—	—	—	—	—
2009–10	Linköping HC	SEL	38	30	21	51	24	12	6	6	12	6
2010–11	HC Sparta Praha	ELH	9	0	3	3	2	—	—	—	—	—
2010–11	Linköping HC	SEL	43	16	21	37	18	7	3	0	3	2
2011–12	Rytíři Kladno	ELH	11	4	2	6	8	—	—	—	—	—
2011–12	Linköping HC	SEL	37	10	13	23	20	—	—	—	—	—
2012–13	Rytíři Kladno	ELH	37	10	11	21	6	—	—	—	—	—
2012–13	Växjö Lakers	SEL	13	5	2	7	2	—	—	—	—	—
2013–14	Rytíři Kladno	ELH	17	4	6	10	10	—	—	—	—	—
2013–14	Växjö Lakers	SHL	10	2	6	8	2	12	4	2	6	0
2014–15	Rytíři Kladno	CZE.2	13	6	8	14	4	7	1	5	6	2
2014–15	HC Sparta Praha	ELH	1	0	0	0	0	—	—	—	—	—
2015–16	HC Sparta Praha	ELH	5	3	4	7	2	14	2	4	6	2
2015–16	HC Benátky nad Jizerou	CZE.2	3	4	0	4	0	—	—	—	—	—
2016–17	HC Sparta Praha	ELH	2	0	0	0	0	2	0	0	0	0
2016–17	HC Benátky nad Jizerou	CZE.2	—	—	—	—	—	1	2	1	3	0
2017–18	HC Stadion Vrchlabí	CZE.3	4	3	4	7	6	8	3	4	7	0
ELH totals			397	131	146	277	319	69	20	13	33	38
NHL totals			436	90	134	224	138	11	0	3	3	2

=== International ===
Medal record

Representing Czech Republic

Ice hockey

World Championships
Gold medal – first place	1999 Norway	
Gold medal – first place	2005 Austria	
Silver medal – second place	2006 Latvia	
Bronze medal – third place	1998 Switzerland	

Year	Team	Event	GP	G	A	Pts	PIM
1994	Czech Republic	EJC	5	0	1	1	0
1995	Czech Republic	WJC	7	2	3	5	4
1996	Czech Republic	WJC	6	0	0	0	2
1998	Czech Republic	WC	8	1	3	4	2
1999	Czech Republic	WC	10	5	5	10	4
2003	Czech Republic	WC	9	4	2	6	2
2004	Czech Republic	WC	7	1	3	4	6
2005	Czech Republic	WC	6	1	2	3	0
2006	Czech Republic	WC	9	2	1	3	4
Junior totals			18	2	4	6	6
Senior totals			49	14	16	30	18

== Transactions ==
- July 14, 1998 - Traded by the New York Islanders to the Calgary Flames in exchange for Jörgen Jönsson.
- June 26, 1999 - Traded by the Calgary Flames along with Calgary's 1999 1st round and 3rd round draft choice, to the New York Rangers in exchange for Marc Savard and New York's 1999 1st round draft choice.
- August 20, 2001 - Traded by the New York Rangers, along with Kim Johnsson, Pavel Brendl and New York's 2003 3rd round draft choice, to the Philadelphia Flyers in exchange for Eric Lindros.
- December 17, 2001 - Traded by the Philadelphia Flyers, along with Tampa Bay's 2002 3rd round draft choice, to the Vancouver Canucks in exchange for Donald Brashear and Vancouver's 2002 6th round draft choice.
- November 1, 2002 - Traded by the Vancouver Canucks, along with Harold Druken, to the Carolina Hurricanes in exchange for Darren Langdon and Marek Malík.
- August 28, 2003 - Signed as a free agent with the New York Rangers.
- June 14, 2007 - Signed as a free agent with the Tampa Bay Lightning.
- February 26, 2008 - Traded by the Tampa Bay Lightning to the Nashville Predators in exchange for a 7th round draft choice.
- August 7, 2008 - Signed as a free agent with Linköpings HC.
