= 2022–23 Czech 1. Liga season =

- League: (Czech Republic) Czech 1. liga
- Sport: Ice hockey
- Duration: 14 September 2022 – 1 March 2023; (regular season); 3 March – 10 April (playoffs)
- Number of games: 52
- Number of teams: 14

Regular season

Playoffs

Finals

Czech 1. Liga seasons
- ← 2021–22 2023–24 →

The 2022–23 Czech 1. liga season was the 30th season of the Czech 1. liga, the second level of ice hockey in the Czech Republic. 14 teams participate in the league.

== Regular season ==
=== Standings ===
Each team played 52 games, playing each of the other thirteen teams four times. Points were awarded for each game, where three points were awarded for winning in regulation time, two points for winning in overtime or shootout, one point for losing in overtime or shootout, and zero points for losing in regulation time. At the end of the regular season, the team that finished with the most points was crowned the league champion.

Pos	Team	Pld	W	OTW	OTL	L	GF	GA	GD	Pts	Qualification
1	Třebíč	52	28	6	3	15	143	118	+25	99	Qualification to Quarter-finals
2	Vsetín	52	31	1	2	18	156	120	+36	97	Qualification to Quarter-finals
3	Poruba	52	23	9	5	15	167	138	+29	92	Qualification to Quarter-finals
4	Prostějov	52	25	4	8	15	155	141	+14	91	Qualification to Quarter-finals
5	Litoměřice	52	23	6	6	17	164	145	+19	87	Qualification to Quarter-finals
6	Zlín	52	21	6	5	20	140	128	+12	80	Qualification to Quarter-finals
7	Jihlava	52	22	4	6	20	132	144	−12	80	Qualification to Wild card round
8	Přerov	52	19	5	12	16	132	125	+7	79	Qualification to Wild card round
9	Frýdek-Místek	52	19	5	5	23	134	138	−4	72	Qualification to Wild card round
10	Slavia Praha	52	19	5	4	24	147	147	0	71	Qualification to Wild card round
11	Kolín	52	17	7	5	23	141	151	−10	70	
12	Sokolov	52	18	4	6	24	132	167	−35	68	
13	Pardubice B	52	11	8	6	27	136	160	−24	55	
14	Šumperk	52	10	8	5	29	141	198	−57	51	Relegated to Czech 2. Liga

Source: Chance liga
Rules for classification: 1) Points; 2) Head-to-head points.

== Playoffs ==
Ten teams qualify for the playoffs: the top six teams in the regular season have a bye to the quarterfinals, while teams ranked seventh to tenth meet each other (7 versus 10, 8 versus 9) in a preliminary playoff round.

=== Bracket ===
Wild-card round (best-of-3)
7	Jihlava	2
10	Slavia Praha	0
8	Přerov	2
9	Frýdek-Místek	0

Quarter-finals (best-of-5)
2	Vsetín	3
7	Jihlava	0
4	Prostějov	3
5	Litoměřice	0
1	Třebíč	3
8	Přerov	1
3	Poruba	1
6	Zlín	3

Semi-finals (best-of-7)
2	Vsetín	4
4	Prostějov	2
(Pairings are re-seeded after the first and second round)
1	Třebíč	1
6	Zlín	4

Finals (best-of-7)
2	Vsetín	2
6	Zlín	4

=== Wild card round ===
Jihlava – Slavia Praha 2–0
3.3.2023	Slavia Praha	Jihlava	2-3
5.3.2023	Jihlava	Slavia Praha	2-1
Jihlava won the series 2–0.

Přerov – Frýdek-Místek 2–0
3.3.2023	Frýdek-Místek	Přerov	2-5
5.3.2023	Přerov	Frýdek-Místek	4-0
Přerov won the series 2–0.

=== Quarterfinals ===
Třebíč – Přerov 3–1
8.3.2023	Třebíč	Přerov	1-2 OT
9.3.2023	Třebíč	Přerov	3-1
12.3.2023	Přerov	Třebíč	1-2
13.3.2023	Přerov	Třebíč	2-3 SO
Třebíč won the series 3–1.

Poruba – Zlín 1–3
8.3.2023	Poruba	Zlín	3-0
9.3.2023	Poruba	Zlín	2-5
12.3.2023	Zlín	Poruba	2-1
13.3.2023	Zlín	Poruba	2-1
Zlín won the series 3–1.

Vsetín – Jihlava 3–0
8.3.2023	Vsetín	Jihlava	4-3 OT
9.3.2023	Vsetín	Jihlava	2-1
12.3.2023	Jihlava	Vsetín	2-3
Vsetín won the series 3–0.

Prostějov – Litoměřice 3–0
8.3.2023	Prostějov	Litoměřice	1-0 OT
9.3.2023	Prostějov	Litoměřice	5-2
12.3.2023	Litoměřice	Prostějov	1-4
Prostějov won the series 3–0.

=== Semifinals ===
Třebíč – Zlín 1–4
18.3.2023	Třebíč	Zlín	3-4
19.3.2023	Třebíč	Zlín	4-2
22.3.2023	Zlín	Třebíč	2-1
23.3.2023	Zlín	Třebíč	3-2 SO
25.3.2023	Třebíč	Zlín	1-2
Zlín won the series 4–1.

Vsetín – Prostějov 4–2
18.3.2023	Vsetín	Prostějov	4-3
19.3.2023	Vsetín	Prostějov	1-0
22.3.2023	Prostějov	Vsetín	3-2
23.3.2023	Prostějov	Vsetín	2-3
25.3.2023	Vsetín	Prostějov	1-3
27.3.2023	Prostějov	Vsetín	1-2
Vsetín won the series 4–2.

=== Finals ===
1 April 2023; 17:00 (UTC+2)	Vsetín	4–3 OT (1–0, 0–2, 2–1) (OT: 1–0) score in the series: 1–0	Zlín	Zimní stadion Na Lapači, Vsetín; Attendance: 5,400

Game reference

Tomáš Vošvrda
Goalies
Daniel Huf

Holec (Smetana) – 04:02	1–0
	1–1	25:27 – Kratochvíl (Talafa)
	1–2	27:02 – Kindl (Sedláček, Mrázek) (PP1)
	1–3	42:50 – Kindl (Sedlák, Kratochvíl)
Klhůfek (Holec) – 45:57	2–3
Půček (Holec, Němec) – 51:55	3–3
Klhůfek (Němec, Číp) (PP1) – 65:37	4–3

8 min
Penalties
35 min
38
Shots
28

2 April 2023; 17:00 (UTC+2)	Vsetín	1–2 (0–1, 1–1, 0–0) score in the series: 1–1	Zlín	Zimní stadion Na Lapači, Vsetín; Attendance: 5,400

Game reference

5 April 2023; 17:30 (UTC+2)	Zlín	4–1 (0–0, 2–0, 2–1) score in the series: 2–1	Vsetín	Zimní stadion Luďka Čajky, Zlín; Attendance: 7,000

Game reference

6 April 2023; 17:30 (UTC+2)	Zlín	4–2 (0–1, 3–1, 1–0) score in the series: 3–1	Vsetín	Zimní stadion Luďka Čajky, Zlín; Attendance: 7,000

Game reference

8 April 2023; 17:00 (UTC+2)	Vsetín	5–2 (1–1, 1–0, 3–1) score in the series: 2–3	Zlín	Zimní stadion Na Lapači, Vsetín; Attendance: 5,040

Game reference
21 min	Penalties	18 min
40	Shots	25

10 April 2023; 17:30 (UTC+2)	Zlín	3–2 OT (1–1, 1–0, 0–1) (OT: 1–0) score in the series: 4–2	Vsetín	Zimní stadion Luďka Čajky, Zlín; Attendance: 7,000

Game reference
6 min	Penalties	8 min
28	Shots	42

== Final rankings ==
Gold medal	Zlín
Silver medal	Vsetín
Bronze medal	Třebíč
4	Prostějov
5	Poruba
6	Litoměřice
7	Jihlava
8	Přerov
9	Frýdek-Místek
10	Slavia Praha
11	Kolín
12	Sokolov
13	Pardubice B
14	Šumperk
