= Tomáš Prokop =

Czech ice hockey player (1994–2021)

- Born: 30 January 1994 České Budějovice, Czech Republic
- Died: 19 September 2021 (aged 27)
- Height: 5 ft 10 in (178 cm)
- Weight: 176 lb (80 kg; 12 st 8 lb)
- Position: Defense
- Shot: Left
- Played for: Motor České Budějovice; IHC Písek; Mountfield HK; BK Havlíčkův Brod; Hokej Šumperk 2003
- Playing career: 2012–2018

Tomáš Prokop (30 January 1994 – 19 September 2021) was a Czech professional ice hockey player. He played for Hokej Šumperk 2003 of the Czech 1.liga.

Prokop made his Czech Extraliga debut playing with Motor České Budějovice during the 2012-13 Czech Extraliga season. He retired in 2018, and died at the age of 27 on 19 September 2021.

== Career statistics ==
=== Regular season and playoffs ===
| | | | Regular season | | | | | Playoffs |
| Season | Team | League | GP | G | A | Pts | PIM | GP | G | A | Pts | PIM |
|---|---|---|---|---|---|---|---|---|---|---|---|---|
| 2012–13 | HC Mountfield ČB | CZE | 8 | 1 | 0 | 1 | 27 | — | — | — | — | — |
| 2012–13 | IHC KOMTERM Písek | CZE–2 | 1 | 0 | 0 | 0 | 0 | — | — | — | — | — |
| 2013–14 | Mountfield HK | CZE | 3 | 0 | 0 | 0 | 0 | — | — | — | — | — |
| 2013–14 | Motor České Budějovice | CZE–2 | 42 | 3 | 1 | 4 | 18 | — | — | — | — | — |
| 2014–15 | BK Havlíčkův Brod | CZE–2 | 4 | 0 | 0 | 0 | 8 | — | — | — | — | — |
| 2014–15 | Salith Šumperk | CZE–2 | 19 | 0 | 1 | 1 | 8 | — | — | — | — | — |
| 2015–16 | Salith Šumperk | CZE–2 | 47 | 0 | 5 | 5 | 24 | — | — | — | — | — |
| 2016–17 | MsHK Žilina | SVK | 38 | 1 | 2 | 3 | 51 | 9 | 0 | 0 | 0 | 0 |
| 2017–18 | Hockey Club de Cergy-Pontoise | FRA–2 | 15 | 1 | 3 | 4 | 28 | — | — | — | — | — |
| CZE totals | | | 11 | 1 | 0 | 1 | 27 | — | — | — | — | — |
| SVK totals | | | 38 | 1 | 2 | 3 | 51 | 9 | 0 | 0 | 0 | 0 |
