= Tomáš Demel =

Czech ice hockey player and coach

- Born: June 26, 1978 (age 48) Nový Jičín, Czechoslovakia
- Height: 178 cm (5 ft 10 in)
- Weight: 82 kg (181 lb; 12 st 13 lb)
- Position: Forward
- Shot: left
- Played for: CZE; HC Vsetín; HC Znojemští Orli; HC Zlín; BK Mladá Boleslav; CZE 2 HC Šumperk; HC Ytong Brno; BK Mladá Boleslav; CZE 3 Jablonec nad Nisou; SVK; HC Slovan Bratislava; HK Spišská Nová Ves; MsHK Žilina; RUS; HC Lada Togliatti
- Playing career: 1997–2018

Tomáš Demel (born 26 June 1978) is a Czech ice hockey coach and former professional player who is currently serving as head coach of AHC Vinschgau - Val Venosta of Italian Hockey League - Division I, the third level league in Italy.

Demel has won the Czech Extraliga three times, all with the HC Vsetin: 1997-1998, 1998-1999 and 2000-2001.
