= Jiří Suchý (ice hockey) =

Czech ice hockey player (1988–2024)

- Born: 3 January 1988
- Died: 16 February 2024 (aged 36)
- Height: 5 ft 11 in (180 cm)
- Weight: 207 lb (94 kg; 14 st 11 lb)
- Position: Defence
- Shot: Left
- Czech Extraliga team: HC Vítkovice
- Playing career: 2001–2020

Jiří Suchý (3 January 1988 – February 2024) was a Czech professional ice hockey defenceman.

Suchý made 118 appearances for the Halifax Mooseheads between the 2005-06 and 2006–07 seasons. He scored 10 goals and 26 assists during this two-season period. After his time in Canada he returned to the Czech Republic. He was a member of the national team that played at the 2008 World Junior Ice Hockey Championships. He later also played in Slovakia and Germany. He played with HC Vítkovice in the Czech Extraliga during the 2007–08, 2008–09 and 2010–11 Czech Extraliga seasons. He also spent time with HC Poruba, HKM Zvolen, HK Detva, HC Dukla Jihlava, HC Slovan Ústečtí Lvi, HC Stadion Litoměřice, HC Šumperk and EV Regensburg.

In February 2024, Suchý died following a motor vehicle collision. He was 36.

== Career statistics ==
			Regular season					Playoffs
Season	Team	League	GP	G	A	Pts	PIM	GP	G	A	Pts	PIM
2001–02	HC Slezan Opava U18	Czech U18	16	0	0	0	6	—	—	—	—	—
2001–02	HC Oceláři Třinec U18	Czech U18	12	1	1	2	8	1	0	0	0	0
2002–03	HC Oceláři Třinec U18	Czech U18	39	4	6	10	116	2	0	0	0	0
2003–04	HC České Budějovice U18	Czech U18	25	6	9	15	54	2	0	1	1	0
2003–04	HC České Budějovice U20	Czech U20	28	1	4	5	34	—	—	—	—	—
2004–05	HC Kladno U18	Czech U18	2	0	0	0	14	7	1	1	2	8
2004–05	HC Kladno U20	Czech U20	42	2	4	6	62	3	1	1	2	14
2005–06	Halifax Mooseheads	QMJHL	62	5	11	16	84	9	1	2	3	12
2006–07	Halifax Mooseheads	QMJHL	56	4	13	17	95	7	0	0	0	12
2007–08	HC Ostrava U20	Czech U20	10	1	2	3	50	—	—	—	—	—
2007–08	HC Vitkovice	Czech	5	0	0	0	8	—	—	—	—	—
2007–08	HC Ostrava	Czech2	10	0	0	0	4	—	—	—	—	—
2008–09	HC Vitkovice	Czech	9	0	0	0	10	—	—	—	—	—
2008–09	HC Poruba	Czech2	30	2	2	4	18	—	—	—	—	—
2009–10	HKM Zvolen	Slovak	24	0	1	1	10	4	0	0	0	4
2009–10	HK Detva	Slovak2	9	1	4	5	16	—	—	—	—	—
2010–11	HC Dukla Jihlava	Czech2	38	0	1	1	20	10	0	0	0	8
2010–11	HC Vitkovice	Czech	1	0	0	0	0	—	—	—	—	—
2011–12	HC Slovan Ústečtí Lvi	Czech2	15	1	1	2	10	—	—	—	—	—
2011–12	HC Stadion Litoměřice	Czech2	15	1	5	6	6	—	—	—	—	—
2011–12	Draci Šumperk	Czech2	12	0	5	5	12	—	—	—	—	—
2012–13	Draci Šumperk	Czech2	32	2	9	11	67	—	—	—	—	—
2012–13	EV Regensburg	Germany3	6	1	0	1	6	4	1	0	1	0
2018–19	TJ Horní Benešov	Czech4	3	2	2	4	—	—	—	—	—	—
2019–20	TJ Horní Benešov	Czech4	4	0	0	0	4	—	—	—	—	—
Czech totals			15	0	0	0	18	—	—	—	—	—
Czech2 totals			152	6	23	29	137	10	0	0	0	8
