= 1997–98 Czech 1. Liga season =

The 1997–98 Czech 1.liga season was the fifth season of the Czech 1.liga, the second level of ice hockey in the Czech Republic. 14 teams participated in the league, and HC Znojemsti Orli won the championship.

== Regular season ==
	Club	GP	W	T	L	Goals	Pts
1.	HC Znojemští Orli	52	29	8	15	169:100	66
2.	HC Liberec	52	31	4	17	167:115	66
3.	HC Berounští Medvědi	52	26	13	13	186:140	65
4.	SK Horácká Slavia Třebíč	52	25	13	14	138:105	63
5.	KLH Chomutov	52	26	10	16	205:179	62
6.	HC Femax Havířov	52	26	9	17	147:110	61
7.	HC Olomouc	52	25	9	18	163:136	59
8.	IHC Písek	52	23	9	20	147:138	55
9.	HC Kralupy nad Vltavou	52	19	14	19	152:154	52
10.	BK Havlíčkův Brod	52	18	8	26	131:165	44
11.	HC Kometa Brno	52	16	11	25	158:188	43
12.	TJ Slovan Jindřichův Hradec	52	15	12	25	122:154	42
13.	HC Prostějov	52	11	10	31	115:183	32
14.	HC Přerov	52	6	6	40	99:222	18

== Relegation ==
- HC Prostějov – HC Šumperk 4:1 (5:1, 2:3, 5:1, 3:2, 6:3)
- HC Přerov – SK Kadaň 2:4 (0:5, 2:3, 2:0, 4:1, 0:3, 1:2)
