= 2016–17 Czech 1. Liga season =

Czech ice hockey league season

The 2016–17 Czech 1. liga season was the 23rd season of the Czech 1. liga, the second level of ice hockey in the Czech Republic. 14 teams participated in the league.

Motor České Budějovice and HC Dukla Jihlava have won this season of the league, HC Dukla Jihlava succeeded in the Extraliga qualification.

HC Most was relegated to the Czech 2. liga after 6 years in the Czech 1. Liga. They have been replaced by HC Karlovy Vary, who have been demoted from the Czech Extraliga.

== Format ==
14 teams compete in the league, with the top 6 teams at the end of the regular season play qualifying for the playoffs. The teams that finish 7th through 10th play a play-in series (best-of-five) to determine who will join the top six into the playoff quarter-finals (best-of-seven). No final is played. Instead, two teams which win the semifinals are declared co-champions and both advance to the qualifying group against two worst placed teams at the end of the Extraliga regular season.

The four lowest ranked teams (11–14) after the regular season play in a play-out group (12 games, all regular-season matches are counted into the ranking). The worst team after 12 rounds is relegated to the Czech 2. Liga.

== Regular season ==
Pl.		GP	W	OTW	OTL	L	Goals	Pts
1.	Motor České Budějovice	52	34	2	5	11	171:101	111
2.	HC Dukla Jihlava	52	26	14	1	11	155:101	107
3.	HC Kladno	52	27	8	4	13	156:112	101
4.	HC Slavia Praha	52	21	11	3	17	128:134	88
5.	SK Horácká Slavia Třebíč	52	19	6	12	15	135:144	81
6.	HC Slovan Ústečtí Lvi	52	17	9	8	18	147:162	77
7.	LHK Jestřábi Prostějov	52	19	6	8	19	162:155	77
8.	HC Benátky nad Jizerou	52	18	5	9	20	124:138	73
9.	HC Frýdek-Místek	52	17	7	7	21	146:153	72
10.	HC ZUBR Přerov	52	17	5	9	21	136:143	70
11.	HC Stadion Litoměřice	52	16	6	8	22	131:133	68
12.	AZ Havířov	52	17	4	5	26	127:131	64
13.	Sportovní Klub Kadaň	52	16	2	6	28	124:160	58
14.	HC Most	52	11	4	4	33	111:186	45

== Playoffs ==
Round of 16
Motor České Budějovice
HC ZUBR Prerov	3
LHK Jestřábi Prostějov	1
HC Slavia Praha
SK Horácká Slavia Třebíč
HC Dukla Jihlava
HC Benátky nad Jizerou	2
HC Frýdek-Místek	3
HC Kladno
HC Slovan Ústečtí Lvi

Quarter-finals
Motor České Budějovice	4
HC ZUBR Prerov	0
HC Slavia Praha	4
SK Horácká Slavia Třebíč	0
HC Dukla Jihlava	4
HC Frýdek-Místek	1
HC Kladno	4
HC Slovan Ústečtí Lvi	0

Semi-finals
Motor České Budějovice	4
HC Slavia Praha	1
HC Dukla Jihlava	4
HC Kladno	3

Final
not played
Third place
not played

== 2017–18 Extraliga qualification ==
Pl.		GP	W	OTW	OTL	L	Goals	Pts
1.	HC Dynamo Pardubice	12	5	1	3	3	36:31	20
2.	HC Dukla Jihlava	12	3	5	1	3	32:29	20
3.	HC Karlovy Vary	12	4	2	3	3	30:29	19
4.	Motor České Budějovice	12	3	1	2	6	20:29	13

HC Dynamo Pardubice have qualified to the Extraliga for the 2017–18 season.

HC Dukla Jihlava have qualified to the Extraliga for the 2017–18 season.

HC Karlovy Vary failed to qualify for the 2017–18 Czech Extraliga season. They will play in the Czech 1. Liga.

Motor České Budějovice failed to qualify for the 2017–18 Czech Extraliga season. They will resume playing in the Czech 1. Liga.

== Play-out ==
Pl.		GP	W	OTW	OTL	L	Goals	Pts
1.	HC Stadion Litoměřice	58	19	8	8	24	149:149	78
2.	AZ Havířov	58	18	5	5	30	138:148	69
3.	Sportovní Klub Kadaň	58	18	3	8	29	143:176	68
4.	HC Most	58	14	4	6	34	134:208	56

HC Most was relegated.
