= Juraj Jurík =

Czech-Slovak ice hockey player

- Born: 20 November 1989 (age 36) Skalica, Czechoslovakia
- Height: 5 ft 9 in (175 cm)
- Weight: 170 lb (77 kg; 12 st 2 lb)
- Position: Right wing
- Shoots: Left
- Slovak 1. Liga team Former teams: HK Skalica; HK Kroměříž; VHK Vsetín; HK 95 Považská Bystrica; LHK Jestřábi Prostějov; HKM Zvolen; MsHK Žilina; HC Nové Zámky; MHk 32 Liptovský Mikuláš; HK Dukla Trenčín
- Playing career: 2006–present

Juraj Jurík (born 20 November 1989) is a Czech-Slovak professional ice hockey right winger who currently playing for HK Skalica of the Slovak 1. Liga.

== Career ==
Jurík began his career as an academy player for HC Zlín from 2003 to 2009, during which he had loan spells in the Czech 2. Liga with HK Kroměříž and VHK Vsetín. He then moved to Slovakia and played for HC Slovan Bratislava's U20 academy for one season before joining HK 36 Skalica in 2010.

After three seasons with Skalica, Jurík returned to the Czech 2. Liga in 2013 with LHK Jestřábi Prostějov. A season later, he returned to Skalica before moving to HKM Zvolen on June 17, 2015. During the 2016–17 season, he moved to MsHK Žilina. On July 27, 2018, Jurík joined HC Nové Zámky and was named the team's captain for the 2019–20 season. He signed an extension with the team on March 17, 2020.

== Career statistics ==
=== Regular season and playoffs ===
			Regular season					Playoffs
Season	Team	League	GP	G	A	Pts	PIM	GP	G	A	Pts	PIM
