= Josef Štraub =

Czech ice hockey forward

- Born: March 5, 1966 (age 59)
- Height: 5 ft 11 in (180 cm)
- Weight: 183 lb (83 kg; 13 st 1 lb)
- Position: Forward
- Shot: Left
- Played for: HC Dukla Jihlava; HC Zlín; HC Oceláři Třinec; HC Vítkovice; HC Slavia Praha; Motor České Budějovice; VHK Vsetín
- Playing career: 1986–2010

Josef Štraub (born March 5, 1966) is a Czech former professional ice hockey forward.

Štraub played in the Czechoslovak First Ice Hockey League and the Czech Extraliga for HC Dukla Jihlava, HC Zlín, HC Oceláři Třinec, HC Vítkovice, HC Slavia Praha, Motor České Budějovice and VHK Vsetín. In his 17 seasons in the top tier of Czech ice hockey, Štraub never won a league championship, winning a silver medal in 1995 and 1999 with Zlín and a bronze medal in 2001 with Vítkovice. He did however win a league championship in the second-tier 1st Czech Republic Hockey League in 2005 with České Budějovice.
