= Jan Výtisk =

Czech ice hockey player

- Born: 20 July 1981 (age 44) Ostrava, Czechoslovakia
- Height: 5 ft 11 in (180 cm)
- Weight: 202 lb (92 kg; 14 st 6 lb)
- Position: Defence
- Shot: Left
- Played for: HC Slezan Opava; Draci Šumperk; HC Sparta Praha; HC Karlovy Vary; HC Plzeň; HC Oceláři Třinec; HC Bílí Tygři Liberec; HC Vítkovice; HC Stadion Litoměřice; HC Frýdek-Místek; HC Kopřivnice
- National team: Czech Republic
- NHL draft: Undrafted
- Playing career: 1999–2025

Jan Výtisk (born 20 July 1981) is a Czech former professional ice hockey defenceman.
