= 2014–15 Czech 1. Liga season =

- League: (Czech Republic) Czech 1. liga
- Sport: Ice hockey
- Number of games: 52
- Number of teams: 14

Regular season
- Season champions: Piráti Chomutov

Playoffs

Finals

Czech 1. Liga seasons
- ← 2013–14 2015–16 →

The 2014-15 Czech 1. liga season was the 21st season of the Czech 1. liga, the second level of ice hockey in the Czech Republic. 14 teams participated in the league.

Piráti Chomutov and ČEZ Motor České Budějovice won this season of the league, with Chomutov later succeeding in the Extraliga qualification, thus being promoted to the league for the following season. They were subsequently replaced by HC Slavia Praha, who were relegated to the 1. Liga after 20 straight seasons in the Extraliga.

HC Rebel Havlíčkův Brod was relegated to the Czech 2. liga after almost 9 years in the league, having been plagued by financial difficulties throughout the season. They were subsequently replaced by HC ZUBR Přerov, who were promoted from the 2. Liga.

== Format ==
14 teams competed in the league, with the top 6 teams at the end of the regular season qualifying for the playoffs. The teams finishing 7th through 10th played a best-of-five play-in series to determine who will join the top six in the playoff quarter-finals (best-of-seven). No final was played. Instead, two teams which won the semifinals were declared co-champions and both advanced to the qualifying group against the two worst placed teams at the end of the Extraliga regular season.

The four lowest ranked teams (11–14) after the regular season played in a play-out group (12 games, all regular-season matches are counted into the ranking). The worst team after 12 rounds was relegated to the Czech 2. Liga.

== Regular season ==
Pos	Team	Pld	W	OTW	OTL	L	GF	GA	GD	Pts	Qualification
1	Piráti Chomutov	52	33	7	6	6	200	102	+98	119	Qualification for Quarter-finals
2	ČEZ Motor České Budějovice	52	26	7	3	16	185	134	+51	95	Qualification for Quarter-finals
3	Třebíč	52	28	2	6	16	145	127	+18	94	Qualification for Quarter-finals
4	Jihlava	52	24	8	5	15	169	140	+29	93	Qualification for Quarter-finals
5	Rytíři Kladno	52	27	4	3	18	185	126	+59	92	Qualification for Quarter-finals
6	Havířov	52	23	4	5	20	147	147	0	82	Qualification for Quarter-finals
7	Kadaň	52	23	2	8	19	139	134	+5	81	Qualification for Wild card round
8	Litoměřice	52	24	3	3	22	151	131	+20	81	Qualification for Wild card round
9	Benátky nad Jizerou	52	20	8	2	22	131	126	+5	78	Qualification for Wild card round
10	Ústí nad Labem	52	22	2	5	23	159	165	−6	75	Qualification for Wild card round
11	Salith Šumperk	52	19	4	5	24	154	188	−34	70	Qualification for Play Out
12	Most	52	11	5	9	27	109	195	−86	52	Qualification for Play Out
13	Prostějov	52	9	5	3	35	116	207	−91	40	Qualification for Play Out
14	Havlíčkův Brod	52	8	6	4	34	115	183	−68	40	Qualification for Play Out

Source: Deník
Rules for classification: 1) Points; 2) Head-to-head points.

== Playoffs ==
Round of 16
Piráti Chomutov
SK Kadaň	1
HC Slovan Ústečtí Lvi	3
HC Dukla Jihlava
Rytíři Kladno
ČEZ Motor České Budějovice
HC Stadion Litoměřice	0
HC Benátky nad Jizerou	3
SK Horácká Slavia Třebíč
AZ Havířov

Quarter-finals
Piráti Chomutov	4
HC Slovan Ústečtí Lvi	2
HC Dukla Jihlava	4
Rytíři Kladno	3
ČEZ Motor České Budějovice	4
HC Benátky nad Jizerou	2
SK Horácká Slavia Třebíč	4
AZ Havířov	0

Semi-finals
Piráti Chomutov	4
HC Dukla Jihlava	1
ČEZ Motor České Budějovice	4
SK Horácká Slávia Třebíč	1

Final
not played
Third place
not played

== 2015-16 Extraliga qualification ==
Pl.		GP	W	OTW	OTL	L	Goals	Pts
1.	HC Olomouc	12	7	0	2	3	34:26	23
2.	Piráti Chomutov	12	5	3	0	4	38:25	21
3.	HC Slavia Praha	12	4	3	1	4	25:23	19
4.	ČEZ Motor České Budějovice	12	2	0	3	7	22:45	9

Piráti Chomutov have been promoted to the Extraliga for the 2015-16 season.

HC Olomouc have qualified for the 2015-16 Czech Extraliga season

HC Slavia Praha have been relegated to the Czech 1. Liga for the 2015–16 season, after 21 straight seasons in the Extraliga.

ČEZ Motor České Budějovice failed to qualify for the 2015-16 Czech Extraliga season. They will resume playing in the Czech 1. Liga.

== Play-out ==
Pl.		GP	W	OTW	OTL	L	Goals	Pts
1.	Salith Šumperk	58	21	5	5	27	200:102	78
2.	HC Most	57*	12	6	10	29	121:215	58
3.	LHK Jestřábi Prostějov	58	13	5	3	37	140:222	52
4.	HC Rebel Havlíčkův Brod	57*	10	6	5	36	129:202	47

*- the final game between HC Rebel Havlíčkův Brod and HC Most was cancelled.

HC Rebel Havlíčkův Brod was relegated.
