= Skořepa =

Skořepa (Czech feminine: Skořepová) is a Czech surname. Notable people with the surname include:

- Allen C. Skorepa (1941–1998), American lichenologist
- Josef Skořepa (born 1981), Czech ice hockey player
- Luba Skořepová (1923–2016), Czech actress
- Zdeněk Skořepa (born 1976), Czech ice hockey player
