= David Dolníček =

Czech ice hockey player

- Born: 6 February 1979 (age 46); Czechoslovakia
- Height: 6 ft 0 in (183 cm)
- Weight: 187 lb (85 kg; 13 st 5 lb)
- Position: Forward
- Shot: Left
- ELH team (P) Cur. team: HC Kometa Brno; SK Horácká Slavia Třebíč (Czech2)
- NHL draft: Undrafted
- Playing career: 1998–2018

David Dolníček (born 6 February 1979) is a Czech professional ice hockey coach and former player. He is currently the head coach of SK Horácká Slavia Třebíč in the First National Hockey League.

Dolníček made his Czech Extraliga debut playing with HC Kometa Brno during the 2012–13 Czech Extraliga season. He played 18 seasons for SK Horácká Slavia Třebíč, finishing his career in 2018 when he was club captain.

In 2024, Dolníček became head coach of SK Horácká Slavia Třebíč, with Roman Erat named as his assistant.
