= Tales of Common Insanity =

2001 Play by Petr Zelenka

Book cover

Tales of Common Insanity (Czech: Příběhy obyčejného šílenství) (2001) is a play by Petr Zelenka which won the Alfréd Radok Award for Best Play. After its opening in Prague, the play was staged in other Czech cities, as well as being translated and staged in a number of other countries. Zelenka wrote and directed a film adaptation of the comedy, which was released as Wrong Side Up in 2005 and was also highly successful.

== Plot summary ==
The comedy centres around Peter, a bachelor in his mid-thirties. He desperately wants to win back his girlfriend Jana and asks his friend Midge for help. Midge, another loner unable to form a long-lasting relationship with a woman, has gone through many break-ups and therefore considers himself an expert. Peter also has to visit his discontented parents.

Peter's mother ruined the family with her endless preaching. She has developed a strong passion for blood donation, and is agitated about the war in Chechnya. Peter's father, a former commentator for Communist newsreel, escapes to his own thoughts. He is preoccupied with the idea of whether a light bulb would fit in a mouth. Peter's neighbour, a composer engaged in a battle to receive royalties for performances of his music by synthesizers in elevators, is also very eccentric.

The cast includes 15 characters. The character of Petr's pedophile boss is sometimes omitted.

== Productions ==
The play's world premiere was in the Dejvice Theatre in Prague on 16 November 2001. The opening months were directed by the playwright, Petr Zelenka. In May 2002 the play was recognised with two Alfréd Radok Awards: Best Play and Talent of the Year for Miroslav Krobot, who performed the role of Father. The play ran until 13 October 2009. Ivan Trojan played the leading role as Petr. Nina Divíšková was nominated for a Thalia Award for her role as Petr's mother. Other notable actors in this production included Martin Myšička as Midge, and Lenka Krobotová as Silvie.

The play was also staged at the Komorní scéna Arena in Prague, directed by Václav Klemens and with Marek Cisovský as Petr, and opened at the Western Bohemian Theatre in Cheb on 24 April 2010, directed by Petr Štindl and with Petr Konáš starring as Petr. The play premiered at the Southern Bohemian Theatre (Czech: Jihočeské divadlo) in Český Krumlov on 1 November 2004, with Pavel Oubram as Petr.

The play, in a production directed by Tereza Růžičková, opened at the Shadbold Centre for the Arts, Vancouver, British Columbia, Canada, on 28 April 2005. A Polish version, translated by Krystyna Krauze (Polish: Opowieści o żwyczajnym szalenstwie), opened in the Teatr Ludowy in Kraków on 16 November 2007, with direction from Andrzej Celiński. Piotr Pilitowski played the role of Petr. A Slovak version, translated by Jana Beňová (Slovak: Príbehy obyčajného šialenstva), opened in the Andrej Bagár Theatre in Nitra on 13–14 December 2002, directed by Svetozár Sprušansk. Milan Ondrík appeared at Petr. On 8 May 2009, the a German version of the play (German: Schrottengel) opened at the Landestheater Tübingen, with Danny Exnar as Petr. The play was later staged in Poland (Teatr Dramatyczny in Warsaw), Hungary (Katona József Theatre in Budapest), as well as in several other Czech theatres. It was also translated into Russian.

In 2005, Zelenka wrote and directed a loose film adaptation, released as Wrong Side Up.

It was published in English in 2002 by Theatre Institut, ISBN 80-7008-133-3 (translated by Robert Russell).
