= Adam Zeman =

Adam Zeman may refer to:

- Adam Zeman (neurologist) (born 1957), British neurologist
- Adam Zeman (ice hockey) (born 1991), Czech ice hockey player
