= 2015–16 Czech 1. Liga season =

22nd season of the Czech 1. Liga

The 2015-16 Czech 1. liga season was the 22nd season of the Czech 1. liga, the second level of ice hockey in the Czech Republic. 14 teams participated in the league. The season began on 9 September 2015.

HC Slavia Praha and HC Dukla Jihlava have won this season of the league, neither succeeded in the Extraliga qualification.

HC Sumperk was relegated to the Czech 2. liga after 5 years in the Czech 1. Liga. They have been replaced by HC Frýdek-Místek, who have been promoted from the 2. Liga.

== Format ==
14 teams compete in the league, with the top 6 teams at the end of the regular season play qualifying for the playoffs. The teams that finish 7th through 10th play a play-in series (best-of-five) to determine who will join the top six into the playoff quarter-finals (best-of-seven). No final is played. Instead, two teams which win the semifinals are declared co-champions and both advance to the qualifying group against two worst placed teams at the end of the Extraliga regular season.

The four lowest ranked teams (11–14) after the regular season play in a play-out group (12 games, all regular-season matches are counted into the ranking). The worst team after 12 rounds is relegated to the Czech 2. Liga.

== Regular season ==
Pl.		GP	W	OTW	OTL	L	Goals	Pts
1.	Rytíři Kladno	52	29	5	7	11	201:151	104
2.	HC Dukla Jihlava	52	29	4	3	16	163:124	98
3.	ČEZ Motor České Budějovice	52	28	6	1	17	185:142	97
4.	HC Slavia Praha	52	24	8	6	14	172:135	94
5.	LHK Jestřábi Prostějov	52	22	4	10	16	148:156	84
6.	HC ZUBR Přerov	52	23	6	3	20	161:149	84
7.	AZ Havířov 2010	52	24	2	3	23	157:154	79
8.	HC Slovan Ústečtí Lvi	52	21	3	6	22	176:178	75
9.	Sportovní Klub Kadaň	52	18	6	5	23	146:159	71
10.	HC Stadion Litoměřice	52	15	10	6	21	149:177	71
11.	SK Horacka Slavia Trebic	52	17	6	7	22	129:147	70
12.	HC Benátky nad Jizerou	52	16	5	3	28	129:144	61
13.	HC Most	52	13	4	5	30	133:184	52
14.	Salith Šumperk	52	11	5	9	27	132:181	52

== Playoffs ==
Round of 16
Rytíři Kladno
SK Kadaň	1
HC Slovan Ústečtí Lvi	3
HC Dukla Jihlava
HC Stadion Litoměřice	0
AZ Havířov 2010	3
HC Slavia Praha
LHK Jestřábi Prostějov
ČEZ Motor České Budějovice
HC ZUBR Přerov

Quarter-finals
Rytíři Kladno	2
HC Slovan Ústečtí Lvi	4
HC Dukla Jihlava	4
AZ Havířov 2010	1
HC Slavia Praha	4
LHK Jestřábi Prostějov	0
ČEZ Motor České Budějovice	4
HC ZUBR Přerov	1

Semi-finals
HC Slovan Ústečtí Lvi	1
HC Dukla Jihlava	4
HC Slavia Praha	4
ČEZ Motor České Budějovice	0

Final
not played
Third place
not played

== 2016-17 Extraliga qualification ==
Pl.		GP	W	OTW	OTL	L	Goals	Pts
1.	HC Litvinov	12	7	2	1	2	42:27	25
2.	HC Karlovy Vary	12	6	1	0	5	42:34	20
3.	HC Slavia Praha	12	3	3	2	4	34:36	17
3.	HC Dukla Jihlava	12	2	1	2	7	25:23	10

HC Litvinov have qualified to the Extraliga for the 2016-17 season.

HC Karlovy Vary have qualified to the Extraliga for the 2016-17 season.

HC Slavia Praha failed to qualify for the 2016-17 Czech Extraliga season. They will resume playing in the Czech 1. Liga.

HC Dukla Jihlava failed to qualify for the 2016-17 Czech Extraliga season. They will resume playing in the Czech 1. Liga.

== Play-out ==
Pl.		GP	W	OTW	OTL	L	Goals	Pts
1.	SK Horacka Slavia Trebic	58	17	6	8	27	137:172	71
2.	HC Benátky nad Jizerou	58	18	6	4	30	144:159	70
3.	HC Most	58	17	4	6	31	151:195	65
4.	Salith Šumperk	58	14	7	9	28	156:195	65

Salith Šumperk was relegated.
