= Vít Jonák =

Czech ice hockey player

Vít Jonak
- Born: July 17, 1991 (age 33)
- Height: 5 ft 10 in (178 cm)
- Weight: 176 lb (80 kg; 12 st 8 lb)
- Position: Forward
- Shoots: Left
- Czech 1.liga team Former teams: VHK Vsetín; Bílí Tygři Liberec
- NHL draft: Undrafted
- Playing career: 2010–present

Vít Jonák (born July 17, 1991) is a Czech professional ice hockey player who currently plays with VHK Vsetín in the Czech 1.liga. He previously played for Bílí Tygři Liberec in the Czech Extraliga.
