= Josef Skořepa =

Czech ice hockey player

- Born: December 18, 1981 (age 44) Nymburk, Czechoslovakia
- Height: 6 ft 1 in (185 cm)
- Weight: 181 lb (82 kg; 12 st 13 lb)
- Position: Forward
- Shoots: Left
- Czech 1.liga team: HC Dukla Jihlava
- Played for: BK Mladá Boleslav; HC Benátky nad Jizerou; HC Bílí Tygři Liberec
- Playing career: 1999–present

Josef Skořepa (born December 28, 1981) is a Czech professional ice hockey forward playing for HC Dukla Jihlava in the Czech 1.liga. He played with HC Benátky nad Jizerou from 2004 to 2012, with three appearances for HC Bílí Tygři Liberec in the Czech Extraliga during the 2009–10 Czech Extraliga season.
