= HC Wikov Hronov =

- League: 2nd Czech Republic Hockey League
- Founded: 1937
- Home arena: Wikov Arena
- Head coach: Václav Voříšek
- Captain: Jiří Hubáček
- Website: hchronov.cz/

HC Wikov Hronov are a Czech ice hockey club based in Hronov, The Czech Republic. The team used to compete in the 2nd Czech Republic Hockey League, the third tier of Czech hockey leagues, but since May 2026 it has focused exclusively on the youth leagues. It was founded in 1937.

Their stadium, Zimní stadium Hronov, sits around 400 spectators.
