= Tomáš Havránek =

Czech ice hockey player

- Born: May 4, 1998 (age 28) Czech Republic
- Height: 5 ft 10 in (178 cm)
- Weight: 165 lb (75 kg; 11 st 11 lb)
- Position: Forward
- Shoots: Left
- Czech 1.liga team Former teams: HC Dukla Jihlava; HC Kometa Brno; HC Karlovy Vary
- Playing career: 2015–present

Tomáš Havránek (born May 4, 1998) is a Czech professional ice hockey player. He is currently playing for HC Dukla Jihlava of the Czech 1.liga.

Havránek previously played for HC Kometa Brno of the Czech Extraliga and made his debut for the team during the 2015-16 Czech Extraliga season. He also had loan spells at Slavia Třebíč, HC Karlovy Vary and HC Dukla Jihlava, then he joined Slavia Třebíč again, in 2020 he signed a contract with HC Dukla Jihlava.
