= Lubomír Štach =

Czech ice hockey player

- Born: May 28, 1986 (age 38); Vsetín, Czechoslovakia
- Height: 5 ft 9 in (175 cm)
- Weight: 181 lb (82 kg; 12 st 13 lb)
- Position: Defence
- Shoots: Left
- EBEL team Former teams: HC TWK Innsbruck; HC Vsetín; HC Kometa Brno; HC Oceláři Třinec; Orli Znojmo Belleville Bulls Peterborough Petes
- Playing career: 2004–present

Lubomír Štach (born May 28, 1986) is a Czech professional ice hockey defenceman currently playing for HC TWK Innsbruck of the Austrian Hockey League (EBEL). He previously played with HC Oceláři Třinec in the Czech Extraliga during the 2010–11 Czech Extraliga season.
