= Adam Zeman (ice hockey) =

Czech ice hockey player

- Born: December 9, 1991 (age 33); Czechoslovakia
- Height: 5 ft 10 in (178 cm)
- Weight: 181 lb (82 kg; 12 st 13 lb)
- Position: Forward
- Shoots: Right
- Czech Extraliga team (P) Cur. team: HC Pardubice; HC Dukla Jihlava (Czech2)
- NHL draft: Undrafted
- Playing career: 2009–present

Adam Zeman (born December 9, 1991) is a Czech professional ice hockey player. He currently plays with HC Dukla Jihlava in the First National Hockey League.

Zeman made his Czech Extraliga debut playing with HC Pardubice during the 2013–14 Czech Extraliga season.
