= 2013–14 Czech 1. Liga season =

The 2013–14 Czech 1.liga season was the 20th season of the Czech 1.liga, the second level of ice hockey in the Czech Republic. 14 teams participated in the league, and BK Mladá Boleslav and HC Olomouc qualified for the qualification round of the Czech Extraliga for the second time in a row. Both of the teams were successful at qualifying for the 2014–15 Czech Extraliga season.

== Regular season ==
Pl.		GP	W	OTW	OTL	L	Goals	Pts
1.	BK Mladá Boleslav	52	39	3	3	7	208:95	126
2.	HC Olomouc	52	34	1	3	14	176:87	107
3.	HC Dukla Jihlava	52	28	8	2	14	166:120	102
4.	HC Rebel Havlíčkův Brod	52	27	3	2	20	143:142	89
5.	SK Horácká Slavia Třebíč	52	23	5	5	19	133:118	84
6.	AZ Havířov 2010	52	24	5	2	21	151:143	84
7.	HC Stadion Litoměřice	52	21	5	6	20	154:151	79
8.	HC Benátky nad Jizerou	52	19	5	7	21	129:133	74
9.	HC Motor České Budějovice	52	17	5	4	26	115:126	65
10.	HC Slovan Ústečtí Lvi	52	18	4	3	27	146:157	65
11.	Salith Šumperk	52	14	9	3	26	139:182	63
12.	SK Kadaň	52	17	2	8	25	111:143	63
13.	Medvědi Beroun 1933	52	15	2	7	28	100:168	56
14.	HC Most	52	9	2	4	37	113:219	39

== Playoffs ==
Quarter-finals
BK Mladá Boleslav	4
HC Benátky nad Jizerou	2
HC Rebel Havlíčkův Brod	1
SK Horácká Slavia Třebíč	4
HC Olomouc	4
HC Stadion Litoměřice	2
HC Dukla Jihlava	4
AZ Havířov	0

Semi-finals
BK Mladá Boleslav	4
SK Horácká Slavia Třebíč	0
HC Olomouc	4
HC Dukla Jihlava	1

Final
Not played

BK Mladá Boleslav and HC Olomouc proceeded directly to the qualification round of the Czech Extraliga after winning their semifinal series. Both teams won qualification, and Rytíři Kladno and Piráti Chomutov were relegated to the First Liga from Extraliga

== Relegation round ==
Pl.		GP	W	OTW	OTL	L	Goals	Pts
1.	HC Most	8	6	0	0	2	34:13	18
2.	LHK Jestřábi Prostějov	8	5	0	1	2	36:22	16
3.	HC Baník Sokolov	8	4	1	1	2	20:16	15
4.	SC Kolín	8	3	0	0	5	21:30	9
5.	Medvědi Beroun 1933	8	0	1	0	7	15:45	2
