= Roman Vlach =

Czech ice hockey player

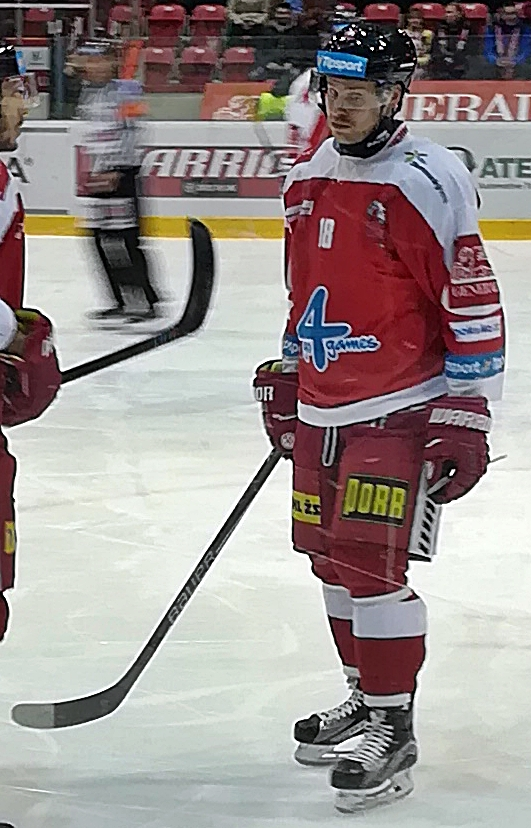
- Roman Vlach in 2017
- Born: June 21, 1989 (age 36) Zlín, Czechoslovakia
- Height: 6 ft 0 in (183 cm)
- Weight: 172 lb (78 kg; 12 st 4 lb)
- Position: Forward
- Shot: Left
- Played for: HC Zlín; HC Bílí Tygři Liberec; HC Karlovy Vary; HC Olomouc; HC Oceláři Třinec; HC Plzeň
- NHL draft: Undrafted
- Playing career: 2007–2024

Roman Vlach (born June 21, 1989) is a Czech former professional ice hockey player.

Vlach first played with HC Zlín in the Czech Extraliga during the 2007–08 Czech Extraliga season.
