= David Březina =

Czech footballer (born 1997)

Personal information
- Full name: David Březina
- Date of birth: 16 February 1997 (age 29)
- Place of birth: Prague, Czech Republic
- Height: 1.82 m (6 ft 0 in)
- Position: Centre back

Team information
- Current team: Ústí nad Labem
- Number: 3

Youth career
- Sparta Prague

Senior career*
Years	Team	Apps	(Gls)
2016–2020	Sparta Prague B	9	(1)
2016	→ Senica (loan)	16	(1)
2017	→ Vlašim (loan)	1	(0)
2018	→ Vlašim (loan)	11	(0)
2018–2019	→ MAS Táborsko (loan)	22	(4)
2019–2020	→ Viktoria Žižkov (loan)	28	(3)
2020–2023	Viktoria Žižkov	45	(2)
2020–2021	→ Opava (loan)	11	(1)
2024–	Ústí nad Labem	57	(5)

International career
2015–2016	Czech Republic U-19	5	(0)
- * Club domestic league appearances and goals as of 28 May 2026

David Březina (born 16 February 1997) is a Czech footballer who plays for Ústí nad Labem as a defender.

== Career ==
=== FK Senica ===
Březina made his professional debut for Senica against AS Trenčín on 23 July 2016.
