= 2012–13 Czech 1. Liga season =

The 2012–13 Czech 1.liga season was the 20th season of the Czech 1.liga, the second level of ice hockey in the Czech Republic. 14 teams participated in the league, and BK Mladá Boleslav and HC Olomouc qualified for the qualification round of the Czech Extraliga.

== Regular season ==
Pl.		GP	W	OTW	OTL	L	Goals	Pts
1.	BK Mladá Boleslav	52	33	7	4	8	191:104	117
2.	HC Olomouc	52	34	2	7	9	190:109	113
3.	HC Slovan Ústečtí Lvi	52	31	8	2	11	192:125	111
4.	SK Horácká Slavia Třebíč	52	25	6	8	13	151:119	95
5.	SK Kadaň	52	25	5	4	18	156:124	89
6.	HC Dukla Jihlava	52	23	5	3	21	163:124	82
7.	HC VCES Hradec Králové	52	21	3	8	20	161:163	77
8.	HC Rebel Havlíčkův Brod	52	20	6	4	22	153:164	76
9.	HC Benátky nad Jizerou	52	19	4	9	20	144:149	74
10.	HC Stadion Litoměřice	52	19	3	7	23	139:151	70
11.	Salith Šumperk	52	13	10	2	27	139:172	61
12.	HC Most	52	9	7	3	33	130:212	44
13.	HC Berounští Medvědi	52	10	4	6	32	118:208	44
14.	IHC Písek	52	9	3	6	34	106:209	39

== Playoffs ==
Quarter-finals
BK Mladá Boleslav	4
HC Rebel Havlíčkův Brod	0
SK Horácká Slavia Třebíč	4
SK Kadaň	0
HC Olomouc	4
HC VCES Hradec Králové	2
HC Slovan Ústečtí Lvi	4
HC Dukla Jihlava	0

Semi-finals
BK Mladá Boleslav	4
SK Horácká Slavia Třebíč	2
HC Olomouc	4
HC Slovan Ústečtí Lvi	0

Final
Not played

BK Mladá Boleslav and HC Olomouc proceeded directly to the qualification round of the Czech Extraliga after winning their semifinal series. Both teams failed to qualify, however.

== Relegation round ==
Pl.		GP	W	OTW	OTL	L	Goals	Pts
1.	HC Benátky nad Jizerou	62	23	5	9	25	175:178	88
2.	HC Stadion Litoměřice	62	24	3	7	28	170:178	85
3.	Salith Šumperk	62	18	11	3	30	180:207	79
4.	HC Most	62	15	7	4	36	161:239	63
5.	IHC KOMTERM Písek	62	14	3	7	38	137:243	55
6.	HC Berounští Medvědi	62	12	5	6	39	146:249	52
