= CZ LOKO Arena =

Ice hockey stadium in the Czech Republic

CZ LOKO Aréna
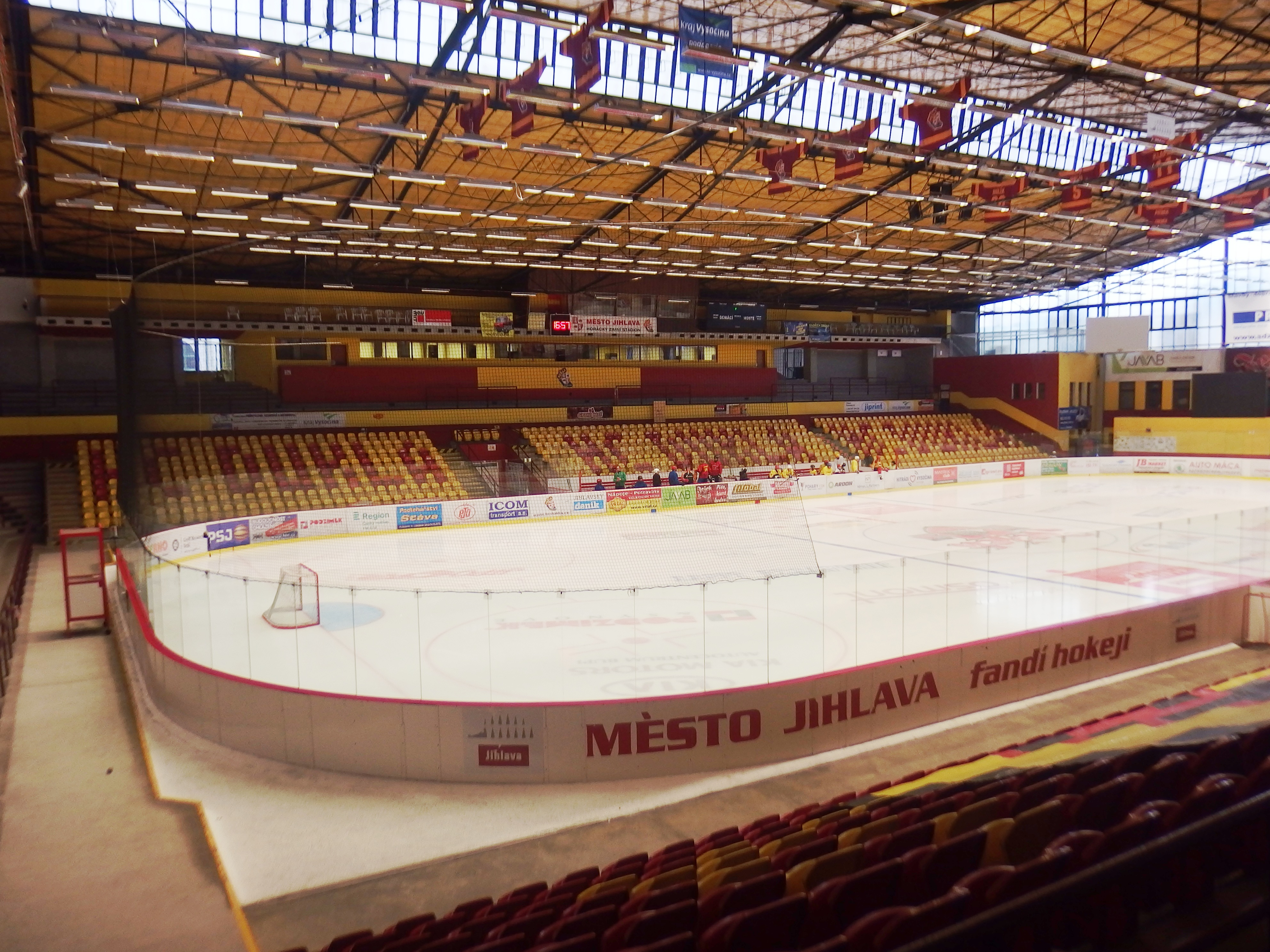
- Interactive map of CZ LOKO Aréna
- Former names: Horácký zimní stadion
- Location: Tolstého 23, Jihlava, Czech Republic, 58601
- Coordinates: 49°23′53.06″N 15°35′00.09″E
- Owner: Jihlava (since 2005), Sportovní klub Jihlava (1990–2005)
- Field size: 28 m × 60 m (92 ft × 197 ft)

Construction
- Built: 1954-1955
- Opened: 31 December 1955
- Renovated: 2011–2013
- Closed: 30 April 2022
- Demolished: 28 July 2023 – 30 November 2023
- Architect: Vladimír Háva
- Structural engineer: Jan Řídký

Tenants
- SK Jihlava (1956–2000), HC Dukla Jihlava (1956–2022)

CZ LOKO Aréna was an indoor sporting arena located in Jihlava, Czech Republic. The capacity of the arena was 7,504 people and it was built in 1955. The roof was completed in 1967. It was home to the HC Dukla Jihlava ice hockey team until spring 2022. Formerly known as the Horácký zimní stadion, the arena took the name CZ LOKO Aréna as part of a sponsorship deal in December 2019. Demolition of the arena started in July 2023.
