= HC Vlci Jablonec nad Nisou =

- City: Jablonec nad Nisou, Czech Republic
- Founded: 1996
- Home arena: Městský zimní stadion
- Colours: Blue, white, black
- General manager: David Bartel
- Head coach: Jaromir Carvan
- Website: https://www.hcvlci.cz/

Former club logo

HC Vlci Jablonec nad Nisou is an ice hockey team in Jablonec nad Nisou, Czech Republic. They play in the Czech 2nd league, the third level of Czech ice hockey. The club was promoted to the 2. Liga in 2001, and have been playing in the league ever since.
