= HC Stadion Vrchlabí =

- City: Vrchlabí, Czech Republic
- League: Czech 2.liga
- Founded: 1948
- Home arena: Zimní stadion Vrchlabí
- Colours: Blue, White and Light blue
- General manager: Jiří Jakubec
- Head coach: Petr Hlaváč

Franchise history
- 1948-1997: TJ Spartak Vrchlabí
- 1997-2011: HC Vrchlabí
- 2011-present: HC Stadion Vrchlabí

HC Stadion Vrchlabí is an ice hockey team in Vrchlabí, Czech Republic. They play in the Czech 2.liga, the second level of ice hockey in the country. The club was founded in 1948. They were promoted to the 1.liga in 2007, by virtue of winning the Czech 2.liga. The organization folded due to financial problems in 2011. The club was almost immediately restarted, and has been playing in the Czech 2.liga since.

After season 2021/22, Vrchlabí resigned from the league and will play 2nd Czech Republic Hockey League.

== Achievements ==
- Czech 2.liga champion : 2007
