= HC Stadion Litoměřice =

Coordinates: 50°31′59″N 14°7′25″E

- City: Litoměřice, Czech Republic
- League: Czech 1.liga (2010–present); Czech 2. liga (2007–2010)
- Founded: 2007
- Home arena: Kalich Aréna
- Colors: Blue, orange, white
- General manager: Daniel Sadil
- Head coach: Miroslav Přerost
- Captain: Jan Výtisk
- Website: www.hclitomerice.cz

Franchise history
- 1971–1991: TJ Rudá hvězda Litoměřice
- 1991–1994: TJ ODDM Stadion Litoměřice
- 1994–present: HC Stadion Litoměřice

HC Stadion Litoměřice is an ice hockey team from Litoměřice, Czech Republic. The team was founded in 2007, however, there was a different team in Litoměřice, operating from the 1970s up to the 1990s. They began in the Czech Second League. They won the league in the 2009-2010 season, and were thus promoted to the First League.

In 2012, the team became an affiliate of HC Sparta Praha, an Extraliga team, and their partnership ended in 2015. That same year, Stadion became an affiliate of Mountfield HK. The team was also briefly an affiliate of Lev Praha, a former KHL team.

== History ==
The original club was started in Litoměřice in 1949, as "Radobýl Litoměřice". In 1957, the team was renamed to "VTJ Dukla Litoměřice" and joined the Second Czechoslovak National League, which was a second-tier league. The team played two seasons in the First Czechoslovak national league (1961/62 and 1963/64). Both of them ended badly for the club, with the team getting relegated back to the Second League each season. The club then went on to play in the Second League for almost two decades. By the end of the 1980s, the team was struggling and was at one point relegated to the regional leagues. The team, like every team playing in Czechoslovakia, was state-owned, and folded after the fall of the Iron curtain.

The club was restarted in 2007, and bought a Czech 2. Liga license. After just three seasons in the league, the team unexpectedly became champions and was promoted to the Czech 1. Liga.

In their first season in the 1. Liga, the team finished 13th out of 16, and narrowly missed play-offs. This was viewed as a success, since the primary goal for the team that season was a to stay in the league.

The team began co-operating with HC Sparta Praha, starting in the 2012/13 season. Ever since then, the Stadion's roster has been made up of young players who couldn't fit on the roster of Sparta Praha. Some players of KHL's Lev Praha also found their way into Litoměřice's squad, as the team began co-operating with Litoměřice around the same time.

Their most successful season in the 1. Liga so far was the 2013/14 season. That season, the team finished in seventh place, and qualified for the play-offs for the first time. Their post-season was very short, as they were eliminated in the semifinals (first round of play-offs) by HC Olomouc. Olomouc then went on to win the playoffs and qualify for the Extraliga.

The first half of the 2014/15 season looked very promising, as the team spent most of it in third place, behind SK Horácká Slavia Třebíč and Piráti Chomutov. However, the team completely collapsed after the new year and thus ended 8th in the regular season. The team's unsuccessful second half was put to an end after a loss in the first round of play-offs.

== First Czech League season by season record ==
2010–11 - 44 GP, 12 W, 9 OTW, 5 OTL, 18 L - 59 points, 13th out of 16, did not qualify for the play-offs

2011–12 - 52 GP, 19 W, 4 OTW, 5 OTL, 24 L - 70 points, 9th out of 14, did not qualify

2012–13 - 52 GP, 19 W, 3 OTW, 7 OTL, 23 L - 70 points, 10th out of 14, did not qualify

2013–14 - 52 GP, 21 W, 5 OTW, 6 OTL, 20 L - 79 points, 7th out of 14, lost in semi-finals (2-4, HC Olomouc)

2014-15 - 52 GP, 24 W, 3 OTW, 3 OTL, 22 L - 81 points, 8th out of 14, lost in first round (0-3, HC Benátky nad Jizerou)

2015-16 - 52 GP, 15 W, 10 OTW, 6 OTL, 21 L - 79 points, 10th out of 14, lost in first round (0-3, AZ Havířov)

== Alumni ==
Some players who grew up in Litoměřice and played for the club include Martin Škoula, Milan Hnilička or Petr Přikryl.

== Achievements ==
- Second Czechoslovak National League champions: 1961, 1963
- Czech Second League champions: 2010
