= Zimní stadion Na Lapači =

Indoor sporting area

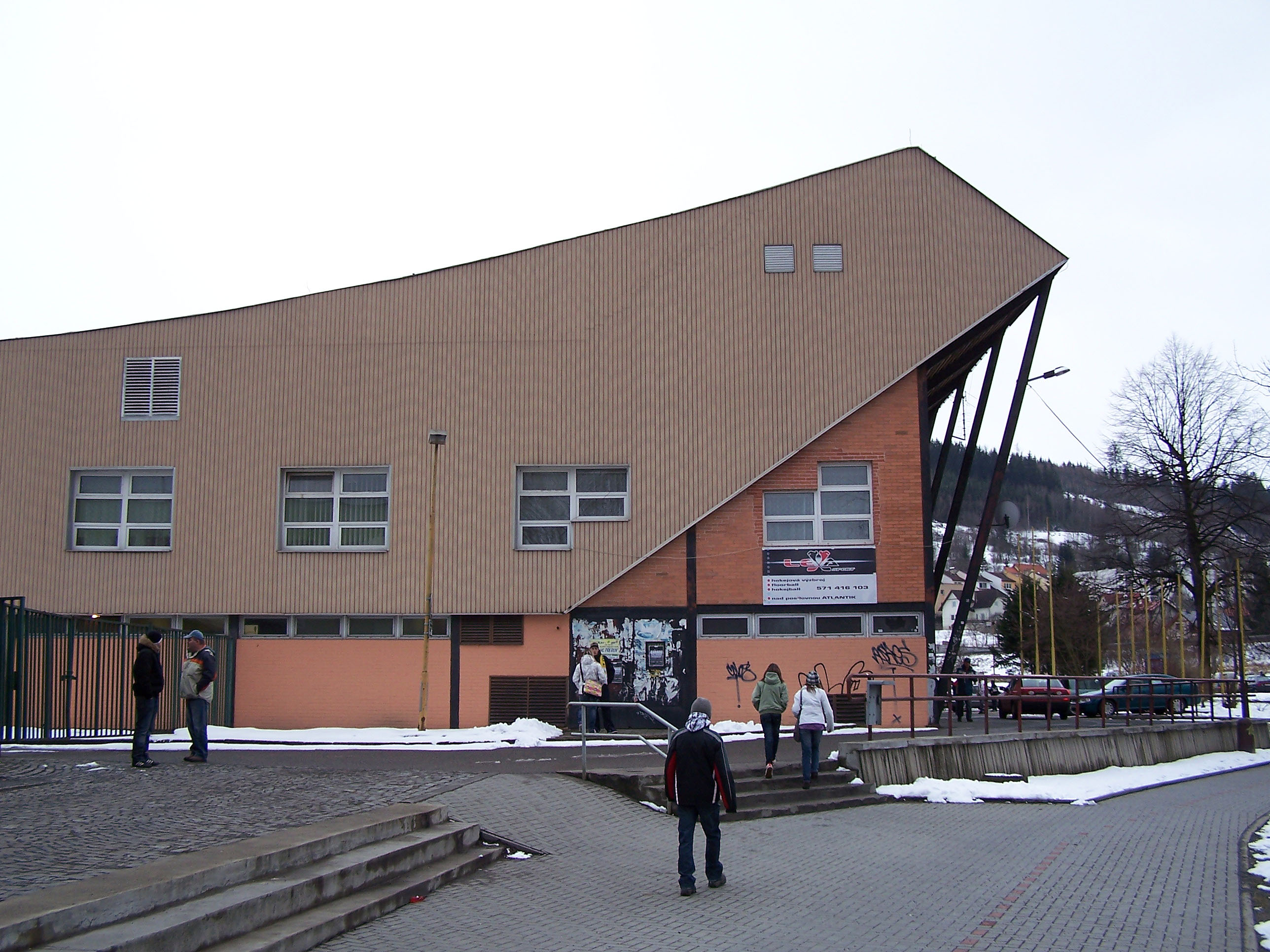
- Interactive map of Zimní stadion Na Lapači
- Location: Na Lapači 394, Vsetín, Czech Republic 755 01
- Coordinates: 49°20′3.152″N 17°59′26.261″E
- Owner: Vsetín
- Capacity: 5,400 (1,700 seated)
- Field size: 26 m × 60 m (85 ft × 197 ft)

Construction
- Opened: 1964
- Renovated: 1986, 2010–2019

Tenant
- VHK Vsetín

Zimní stadion Na Lapači is an indoor sporting arena located in Vsetín, Czech Republic. The capacity of the arena is 5,400 people and was built in 1964. It is currently home to the VHK Vsetín ice hockey team.
