= HC Frýdek-Místek =

- City: Frýdek-Místek
- League: 1st Czech Republic Hockey League
- Founded: 1976
- Home arena: Hala Polárka
- Colours: Red, white
- Owner: HC Frýdek-Místek 2015 s.r.o.
- General manager: Jakub Mikulík
- Head coach: Martin Janeček
- Affiliates: HC Oceláři Třinec
- Website: hokej.hcf-m.cz

Hockey Club Frýdek-Místek is a professional ice hockey club from Frýdek-Místek, Czech Republic. It was founded in 1976.

== History ==
It was founded in 1976 as a successor to multi-sports club TJ Válcovna Plechu. Since 1991, with the exception of five years (2004–2009), when the club sold the license to Salith Šumperk, they have been a regular participant in the 2nd division. Since the 2015/16 season, the club entered in a partnership with HC Oceláři Třinec. In the 2015/16 season, the club managed to advance to the 1st division.

== Naming history ==
- 1976 – TJ VP Frýdek-Místek (Tělovýchovná jednota Válcovny Plechu Frýdek-Místek)
- 1977 – TJ Slezan Frýdek-Místek (Tělovýchovná jednota Slezan Frýdek-Místek)
- 1990 – HC Slezan Frýdek-Místek (Hockey Club Slezan Frýdek-Místek)
- 1997 – HC Frýdek-Místek (Hockey Club Frýdek-Místek)
