= VHK Vsetín =

VHK ROBE Vsetín
- City: Vsetín, Czech Republic
- League: Czech 1. liga
- Founded: 1905
- Home arena: Zimní stadion Na Lapači (capacity 5,400)
- Colours: Green, yellow
- Head coach: (Czech Republic) Jiří Weintritt
- Website: hc-vsetin.cz

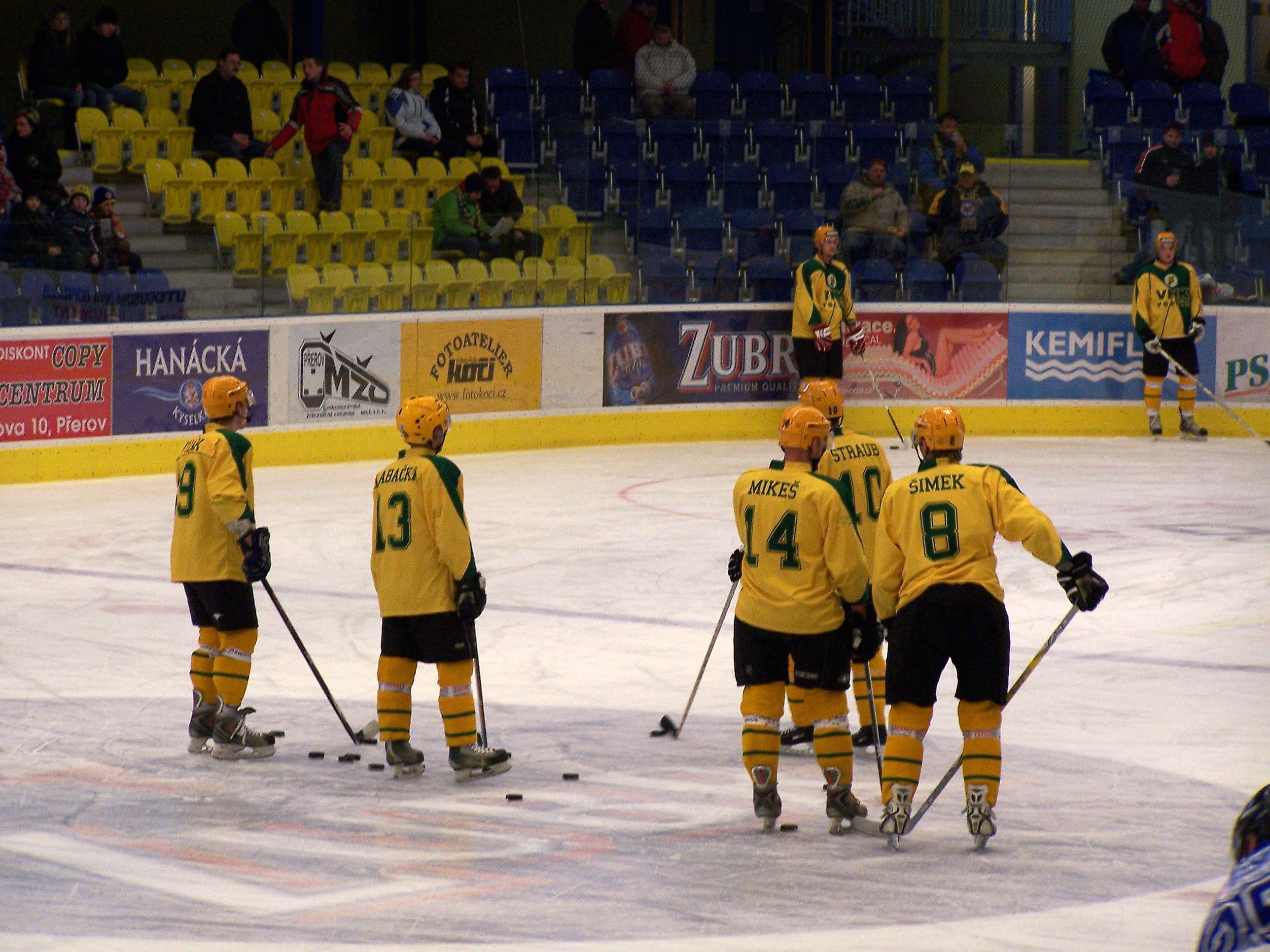
Players of VHK Vsetín warming up before the 2nd Czech Republic Hockey League's 3rd play-off game with HC ZUBR Přerov in Přerov.

Valašský hokejový klub Vsetín, also known as Hockey Club Vsetín, is a professional ice hockey team in the Czech 1. liga (second-level league). The team is the most successful team in Czech Republic ice hockey history, winning five straight Extraliga championships between 1995 and 1999, and another in 2001 for six titles in seven years. Their home arena is Zimní stadion Na Lapači in Vsetín. In the 2005–06 and 2006-07 seasons, they finished at the bottom of the league and did not participate in any competition in the 2007-08 season due to financial problems. Hockey returned to Vsetín a year later, when a new team was founded. The team has been playing in the Czech 1. liga since the 2017-18 season after being promoted from the Czech 2. liga (third-level league) in 2016-17.

== Honours ==
=== Domestic ===
Czech Extraliga

- (gold) Winners (6): 1994–95, 1995–96, 1996–97, 1997–98, 1998–99, 2000–01
- (silver) Runners-up (1): 1999–2000

Czech 1. Liga

- (silver) Runners-up (2): 2021–22, 2022–23
- (bronze) 3rd place (1): 2020–21

=== Pre-season ===
Rona Cup

- (gold) Winners (1): 1997

== Club names ==
- 1905 – SK (Sportovní klub) Vsetín
- 1906 – Bruslařský klub Vsetín
- 1933 – Sokol Vsetín
- 1968 – Zbrojovka Vsetín
- 1994 – HC (Hockey club) Dadák Vsetín
- 1996 – HC Petra Vsetín
- 1998 – HC Slovnaft Vsetín
- 2001 – HC Vsetín
- 2003 – Vsetínská hokejová
- 2008 – Valašský hokejový klub (VHK)
- 2016 – VHK ROBE Vsetín
