= HC RT Torax Poruba =

- City: Ostrava-Poruba, Czech Republic
- League: Czech 1.liga
- Founded: 1946
- Home arena: RT Torax arena
- Colours: Red, blue, white
- General manager: Pavel Hinner
- Head coach: Jiří Režnar
- Website: www.hcporuba.cz

Franchise history
- 1946–1948: SK Poruba
- 1948–1953: TJ Sokol Poruba
- 1953–1964: DSO Tatran Poruba
- 1964–1978: TJ Sokol Poruba
- 1978–1994: TJ Hutní Montáže Ostrava
- 1994–2001: (S)HK Poruba
- 2001–2008: HC Sareza Ostrava
- 2001–2010: HC VOKD Poruba
- 2010–present: HC RT Torax Poruba

HC RT Torax Poruba is an ice hockey team in Ostrava-Poruba, Czech Republic. They play in the Czech 1.liga, the second level of ice hockey in the Czech Republic. The club was founded as SK Poruba in 1946.

== Achievements ==
- Czech 2.liga champion : 2004, 2018.
- Promoted to the Czech 1.liga : 2004, 2018.

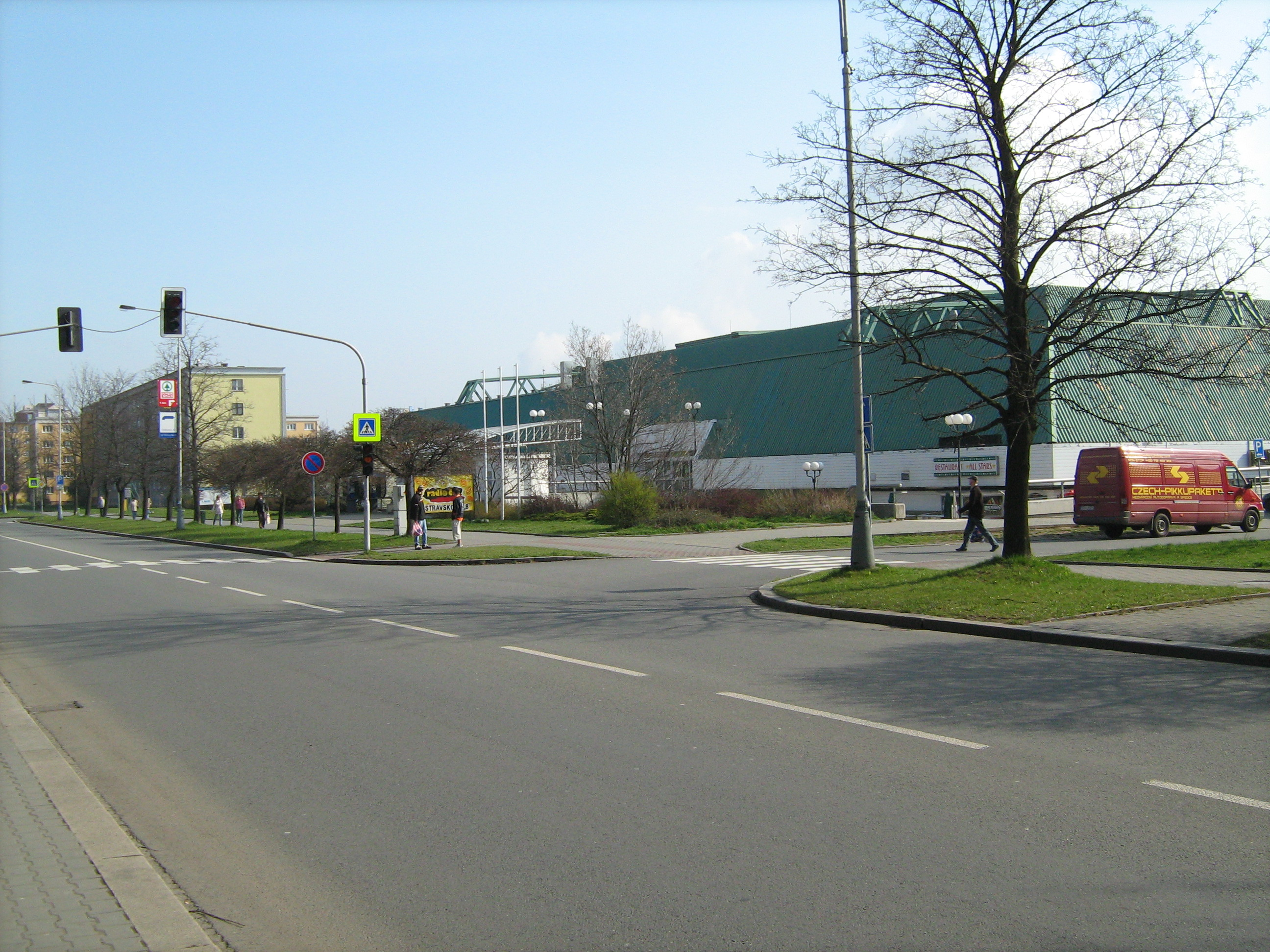
Stadium of HC Sareza Poruba
