= HC ZUBR Přerov =

Czech ice hockey team

- City: Přerov, Czech Republic
- League: Czech 1. Liga
- Founded: 1928
- Home arena: Zimní stadion Přerov (3,000 places, 1,951 seats)
- Colours: Blue, yellow
- General manager: Pavel Hanák
- Head coach: Robert Svoboda
- Website: hokejprerov.cz

Previous logo

HC ZUBR Přerov is an ice hockey team currently playing in the Czech 1. Liga (second level). The club is based in Přerov and their home arena is Zimní stadion Přerov. The team is sponsored by the Zubr Brewery.

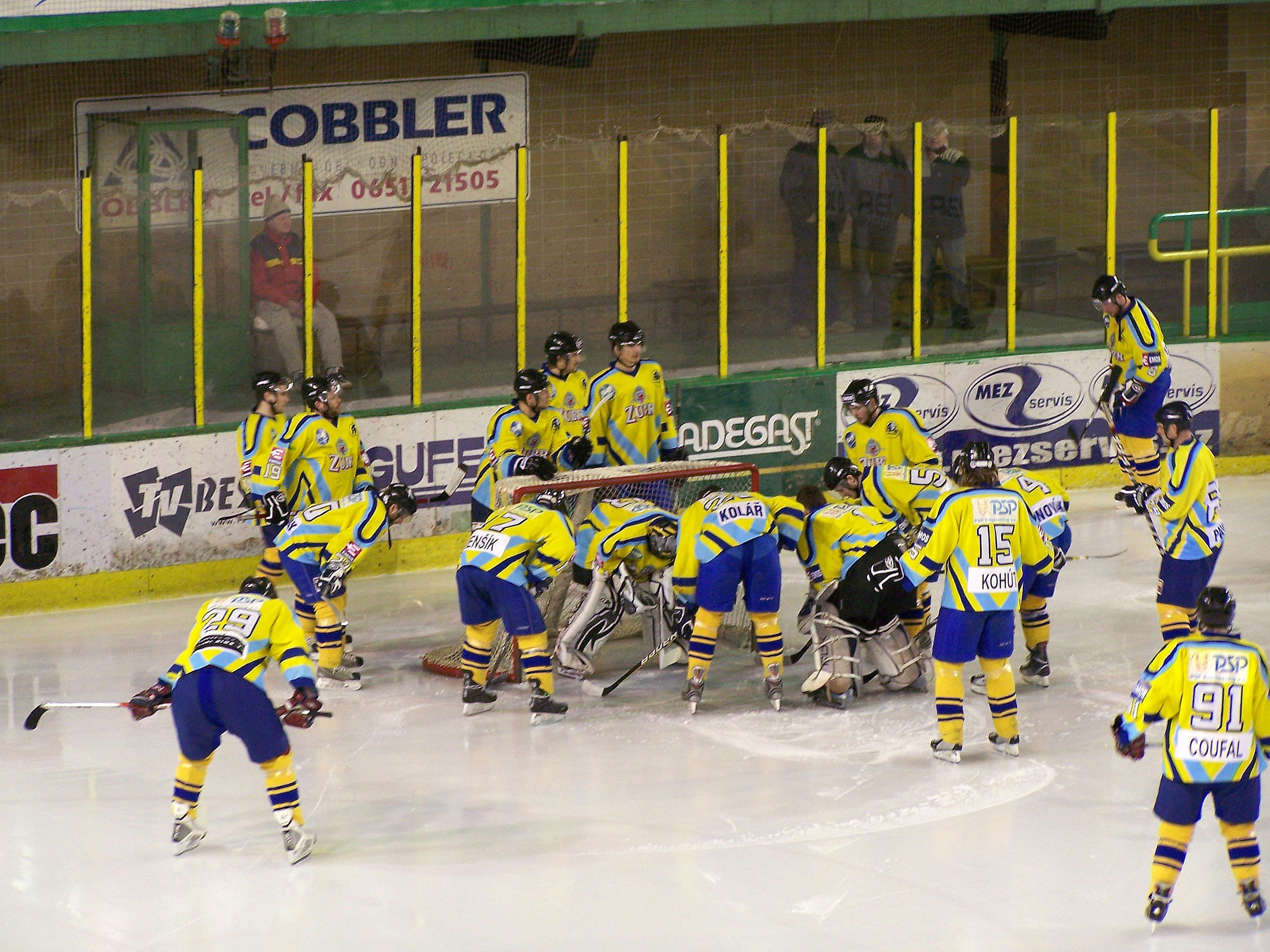
Players of HC ZUBR Přerov before the 2nd National Hockey League's 4th play-off game with VHK Vsetín in Vsetín

== History ==
First ice hockey games in Přerov were played shortly before First World War. First club in Přerov was founded in 1928. This club played its very first game in January 1929 in Kroměříž against club from that town. Přerov won this game as well as their first home game against B-team of nearby Prostějov played four days later.

In the early nineteen fifties Přerov hockey club has suffered big dip in quality because for long time it remained one of very few clubs without its own stadium. For few years the club even ceased to exist. It was only from 1953 to 1954 season that Přerov had its own hockey club once again. And later in year 1971 local club under the name of Spartak Meopta Přerov finally had its official stadium.

In modern history the club has mostly oscillated between second and third level Czech hockey leagues, but currently it seems to have a very solid position in Czech Republics' second highest ice hockey league called Chance liga (after the main sponsor of this league).
