= HC Benátky nad Jizerou =

- City: Benátky nad Jizerou, Czech Republic
- League: 2nd Czech Republic Hockey League
- Founded: 1934
- Home arena: Zimní stadion Benátky nad Jizerou
- General manager: Jan Stehlík
- Head coach: Antonín Nečas
- Website: hokejbenatky.cz

HC Benátky nad Jizerou is an ice hockey team in Benátky nad Jizerou, Czech Republic. They play in the Czech 2. Liga, the third level of ice hockey in the country. The club was founded in 1934.

== Team names ==
- 1934 - HC Sokol Benátky nad Jizerou
- 1938 - SK Benátky nad Jizerou
- 1948 - HC Spartak Benátky nad Jizerou
- 1970 - HC Benátky nad Jizerou
