= 2nd Czech Republic Hockey League =

Third highest hockey competition in the Czech Republic

- Upcoming season or competition: 2025–26 Czech 2.liga season
- Sport: Ice hockey
- Founded: 1993
- No. of teams: 28
- Country: Czech Republic
- Most recent champion: AZ Havířov
- Most titles: Mostečtí lvi and Draci Šumperk (6 titles)
- Promotion to: Czech 1.liga
- Relegation to: Krajské hokejové přebory
- Related competitions: Czech Extraliga; Czech 1.liga
- Website: hokej.cz/druha-liga

The 2nd Czech Republic Hockey League (or Czech 2.liga) is the third-level ice hockey league in the Czech Republic under the 1st Czech Republic Hockey League. It began in 1993.

== Format ==
From 1993 to 2001 the league was divided into the Western and Eastern divisions.

From the 1996/1997 season the play-offs were introduced, they were joint for both divisions

From 1999 to 2001 the Western and Eastern division had separate play-offs.

Since the 2001/2002 season the current division to Western, Central and Eastern applies, with the exception of the 2008/2009 season when the Central Division was incorporated into the Western Division.

From the 2001/2002 season the Western and Central divisions have joint play-offs, while the Eastern Division has separate play-offs.

For the 2009/2010 season, 33 teams are divided into the Western, Central and Eastern divisions. Winners of the league play-offs play a qualification round robin with the worst teams from the 1st Czech Republic Hockey League.

The league shrunk down to just two divisions and 28 teams, with 17 playing in the Western division and 11 in the Eastern, for the 2013/14 season.

Since the 2014/15 season, the winners of the Western and Eastern division play-offs face each other in a best-of-7 series. The winner directly advances to the First League, without having to play the qualification series. The last placed team in each division at the end of regular season will be directly relegated to the regional championship.

Since the 2016/17 season, the league has gone back to having 3 divisions and 27 teams.

Since the season 2022/23, the league returned 2 divisions Western and Eastern, The winners of the Western and Eastern division play-offs face each other in a best-of-7 series, The winner directly advances to 1st Czech Republic Hockey League

== 2026-27 teams ==
(based on confirmed promotions and relegations)

Western group HC Děčín BK Havlíčkův Brod Mostečtí lvi HC Milevsko 1934 HC Wikov Hronov HK Kralupy nad Vltavou HC Příbram HC Stadion Cheb SK Kadaň IHC Králové Písek HC Kobra Praha HC Benátky nad Jizerou TJ Spartak Nové Město nad Metují HC Stadion Vrchlabí	Eastern group SKLH Žďár nad Sázavou Orli Znojmo HHK Velké Meziříčí Draci Šumperk SHKM Hodonín HC Slezan Opava HK Nový Jičín HC Bobří Valašské Meziříčí HC RT Torax Poruba HC ISMM Kopřivnice HC Spartak Uherský Brod HK Kroměříž LHK Jestřábi Prostějov

== Champions ==
- 1994 IHC Písek, HC ZVVZ Milevsko
- 1995 HC Karlovy Vary, SK Horácká Slavia Třebíč
- 1996 HC Příbram, HC Milevsko, SK Horácká Slavia Třebíč
- 1997 HC Znojmo, SK Horácká Slavia Třebíč
- 1998 SK Kadaň, HC Šumperk
- 1999 HC Slovan Ústí nad Labem, HC Šumperk
- 2000 HC Slovan Ústí nad Labem, HC Ytong Brno
- 2001 BK Mladá Boleslav, HC Baník Most, HC Nový Jičín
- 2002 BK Mladá Boleslav, HC Baník Most, HC Orlová
- 2003 HC Benátky nad Jizerou, HC Baník Most, HC Olomouc
- 2004 HC Baník Most, HC Vajgar Jindřichův Hradec, HC Sareza Ostrava
- 2005 HC Vajgar Jindřichův Hradec, HC Rebel Havlíčkův Brod, HC Prostějov
- 2006 HC Rebel Havlíčkův Brod, IHC Písek, VSK Technika Brno
- 2007 HC Vrchlabí, HC Most, HC Šumperk
- 2008 VSK Technika Brno, HC Chrudim, HC Benátky nad Jizerou
- 2009 Hokej Šumperk 2003, HC Tábor, HC ZVVZ Milevsko
- 2010 HC Bobři Valašské Meziříčí, HC Stadion Litoměřice, IHC Písek
- 2011 KLH Vajgar Jindřichův Hradec, HC Baník Most, Salith Šumperk
- 2012 HC Klášterec nad Ohří, SHK Hodonín, HC AZ Havířov 2010
- 2013 HC Tábor, VSK Technika Brno, HC AZ Havířov 2010
- 2014 LHK Jestřábi Prostějov, HC Baník Sokolov, SC Kolín
- 2015 HC ZUBR Přerov, HC Tábor, HC Baník Sokolov
- 2016 HC Tábor, HC Vlci Jablonec nad Nisou, HC Frýdek-Místek
- 2017 VHK Vsetín, HC Vlci Jablonec nad Nisou, BK Havlíčkův Brod
- 2018 HC RT TORAX Poruba, HC Vlci Jablonec nad Nisou, BK Havlíčkův Brod
- 2019 HC Baník Sokolov
- 2020 Draci Pars Šumperk, SC Kolín, HC Stadion Vrchlabí (automatically promoted)
- 2021 cancelled
- 2022 HC Tábor
- 2023 Orli Znojmo
- 2024 Piráti Chomutov
- 2025 HC Tábor
- 2026 AZ Havířov
