= SK Horácká Slavia Třebíč =

- City: Třebíč, Czech Republic
- League: Czech 1.liga
- Founded: 1928
- Home arena: Zimní stadion Třebíč
- Colours: Blue, red, white
- Head coach: David Dolníček
- Affiliates: HC Kometa Brno
- Website: www.hstrebic.cz

Franchise history
- 1928–1949: Horácká Slavia Třebíč
- 1949–1952: Elektromontážní závody
- 1952–1954: Kovosvit Třebíč
- 1954–1969: Spartak Třebíč
- 1969–1975: Západomoravské strojírny
- 1975–1979: Zetor B Třebíč
- 1979–1990: Elitex Třebíč
- 1990–present: SK Horácká Slavia Třebíč

SK Horácká Slavia Třebíč is an ice hockey team in Třebíč, Czech Republic. They play in the Czech 1.liga, the second level of ice hockey in the country. The club was created in 1928. Some notable NHL players were born in Třebíč and started their hockey career in this club: Patrik Eliáš, Martin Erat and Vladimír Sobotka.

== Honours ==
=== Domestic ===
Czech 1. Liga

- (bronze) 3rd place (1): 2022–23
- Czech 2.liga champion: 1995, 1996, 1997

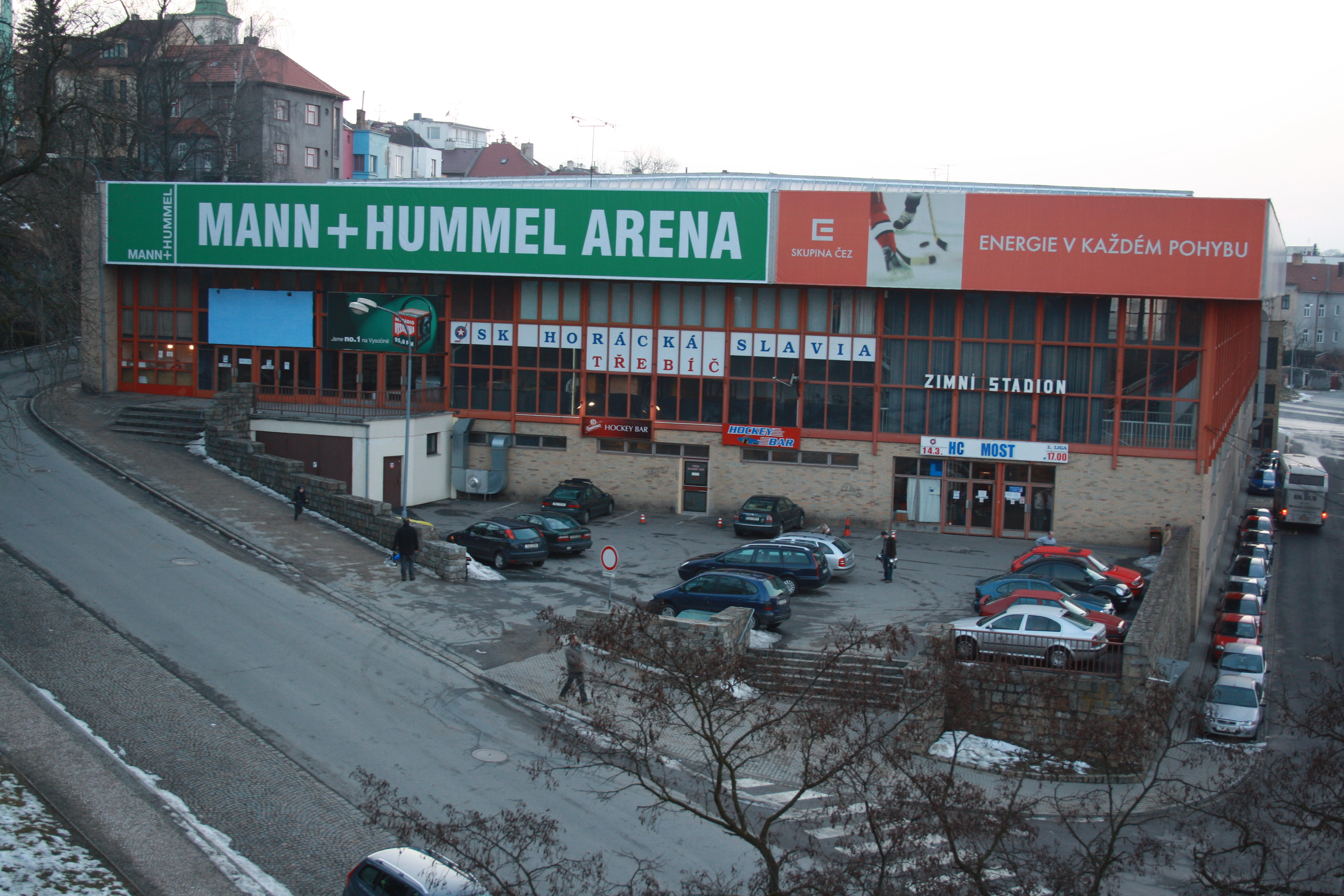
Stadium of SK Horácká Slavia Třebíč
