= LHK Jestřábi Prostějov =

- City: Prostějov, Czech Republic
- League: Czech 1. Liga
- Founded: 1913
- Home arena: Zimní stadion Prostějov
- Colours: Red, white
- General manager: Jaroslav Luňák
- Head coach: Aleš Totter
- Website: lhkjestrabi.cz

Franchise history
- 1913–1948: Sportovní Klub Prostějov
- 1959–1969: TJ Železárny Prostějov
- 1969–1989: TJ Prostějov
- 1989–2004: HC Prostějov
- 2004–2008: HK Jestřábi Prostějov
- 2008–present: LHK Jestřábi Prostějov

LHK Jestřábi Prostějov is an ice hockey team in Prostějov, Czech Republic. They play in the Czech 1. Liga, the second level of ice hockey in the Czech Republic. The club was founded as Sportovní Klub Prostějov in 1913.

== Achievements ==
- Czech 2.liga champion: 1999, 2005, 2014.
- Tatra Cup champion: 1932, 1946, 1952.
