= Draci Šumperk =

Czech ice hockey team

DRACI PARS ŠUMPERK
- City: Šumperk, Czech Republic
- League: Czech 2. Liga
- Founded: 2003
- Home arena: Škoda aréna
- Colours: Blue and Yellow
- General manager: Vladimír Velčovský
- Head coach: Lukáš Majer
- Website: http://www.dracisumperk.cz

Franchise history
- 2010 - 2016: Hokej Šumperk 2003
- 2010 - 2016: Salith Šumperk
- 2016 - present: Draci Šumperk

DRACI PARS ŠUMPERK is an ice hockey team in Šumperk, Czech Republic. They played in the Czech 1 .liga, the second level of ice hockey in the Czech Republic until the 2015-2016 season. They were relegated to 2.liga for the 2016-2017 season. The club was founded in 1942.

The team was promoted back to the Czech 1. liga for the 2020-2021 season where they played for the next 3 seasons (2020-2021, 2021-2022, 2022-2023) before getting relegated once again to the 2. liga at the end of the 2022-2023 season.

On 25 February 2023 it was announced on their official homepage that the team is being put up for sale.

== Achievements ==
- Czech 2.liga champion: 1998, 1999, 2007, 2009, 2011.
