= 1st Czech Republic Hockey League =

Second-level ice hockey league in the Czech Republic under the Czech Extraliga

Maxa liga
- Upcoming season or competition: 2025–26 Czech 1. Liga season
- Sport: Ice hockey
- Founded: 1993
- No. of teams: 14
- Country: Czech Republic
- Most recent champion: HC Dukla Jihlava (6th title)
- Promotion to: Czech Extraliga
- Relegation to: Czech 2.liga
- Related competitions: Czech Extraliga; Czech 2.liga
- Website: hokej.cz/maxa-liga

The Maxa liga is the second-highest level of professional ice hockey in the Czech Republic, after the Extraliga. It began in 1993 and is run and administered by Czech Ice Hockey Association.

Until 2015, the league was known as the 1st Czech National Hockey League. It was then known as the WSM Liga until 2018, and the Chance Liga until 2024.

== Format (2023-24) ==
In the first phase, every team plays each other four times—twice at home and twice away—which makes for a 52-game regular season.

After the 52-game regular season, the first six teams directly qualify for the quarter-finals, while teams which placed 7 to 10 play a round-robin to determine the final two participants in the quarter-finals.

The playoffs end with the finals, with the winning team going on to face the bottom team from the Extraliga in a round-robin. The winner of the round-robin is promoted to Extraliga for the following season.

The last placed team at the end of the regular season is directly relegated to the Second League for the following season. They are replaced by the winner of a 3 team round-robin group between the winners of the East, the Central and the West divisions of the Second League.

Three points are awarded for a win in regulation time and two points for an overtime or shootout victory, while the team defeated in overtime or shootout gets one point.

The level of 1. národní hokejová liga is slightly lower than the Czech Extraliga, but there are a lot of players moving between those two leagues every season. Each team in this league is allowed to have five imports. The league has no salary cap, with an average salary of USD 2200 per month, but some of the best players reportedly sign contracts for more than USD 5000 per month, plus most of the teams cover accommodation expenses for their players during the season.

Chance Liga (2018–2024)

== Current teams (2023-24) ==
Team	City	Arena	Capacity	Affiliate Team
HC Baník Sokolov	Sokolov	Zimni stadion Sokolov	5,000	independent
VHK ROBE Vsetín	Vsetín	Zimní stadion Na Lapači	5,386	independent
HC Slavia Praha	Prague	Zimní stadion Eden	4,000	independent
HC Stadion Litoměřice	Litoměřice	Kalich arena	1,750	independent
HC ZUBR Přerov	Přerov	Zimní stadion Přerov	3,000	independent
HC Frýdek-Místek	Frýdek-Místek	Hala Polárka	2,056	HC Oceláři Třinec (ELH)
LHK Jestřábi Prostějov	Prostějov	Zimní hokejový stadion Prostějov	5,125	independent
HC Dukla Jihlava	Jihlava	CZ LOKO Arena	6,500	independent
SK Horácká Slavia Třebíč	Třebíč	Zimní stadion města Třebíče	5,000	independent
HC RT TORAX Poruba	Poruba	Zimní stadion Ostrava - Poruba	5,000	independent
HC Dynamo Pardubice B	Chrudim	Zimní stadion Chrudim	1,744	HC Dynamo Pardubice (ELH)
SC Kolín	Kolín	Zimní stadion Kolín	5,500	Mountfield HK (ELH)
Piráti Chomutov	Chomutov	Rocknet Arena	4,020	HC Litvínov (ELH)
Berani Zlin	Zlín	Zimní stadion Luďka Čajky	7,000	independent

== Champions ==
- 1993–94 Vsetínská hokejová and HC Slavia Praha
- 1994–95 HC Kometa Brno and TZ Třinec
- 1995–96 HC Přerov and HC Opava
- 1996–97 HC Becherovka Karlovy Vary and HC Kralupy nad Vltavou
- 1997–98 HC Znojemští Orli
- 1998–99 HC Znojemští Orli
- 1999–2000 HC Dukla Jihlava
- 2000–01 KLH Chomutov
- 2001–02 HC Bílí Tygři Liberec
- 2002–03 HC Vagnerplast Kladno
- 2003–04 HC Dukla Jihlava
- 2004–05 HC České Budějovice
- 2005–06 HC Slovan Ústí nad Labem
- 2006–07 HC Slovan Ústí nad Labem
- 2007–08 BK Mladá Boleslav
- 2008–09 HC Slovan Ústečtí Lvi
- 2009–10 KLH Chomutov
- 2010–11 HC Slovan Ústečtí Lvi
- 2011–12 Piráti Chomutov
- 2012–13 BK Mladá Boleslav and HC Olomouc
- 2013–14 BK Mladá Boleslav and HC Olomouc
- 2014–15 Piráti Chomutov and Motor České Budějovice
- 2015–16 HC Dukla Jihlava and HC Slavia Praha
- 2016–17 Motor České Budějovice and HC Dukla Jihlava
- 2017–18 Energie Karlovy Vary and Rytíři Kladno
- 2018–19 Motor České Budějovice and Rytíři Kladno
- 2019–20 Motor České Budějovice
- 2020–21 Rytíři Kladno
- 2021–22 HC Dukla Jihlava
- 2022–23 PSG Berani Zlín
- 2023–24 VHK Vsetín
- 2024–25 HC Dukla Jihlava
- 2025–26 HC Dukla Jihlava
