= List of Czech sportspeople =

This is a partial list of Czech sportspeople. For the full plain list of Czech sportspeople on Wikipedia, see Category:Czech sportspeople.

== Alpine skiing ==
- Olga Charvátová (born 1962)
- Petra Kurková (born 1973)
- Ester Ledecká (born 1995)
- Šárka Strachová (born 1985)
- Šárka Záhrobská (born 1985)

== Athletics ==
- Jaroslav Bába (born 1984)
- Tomáš Dvořák (born 1972)
- Arie Gill-Glick (1930-2016), Israeli Olympic runner
- Jitka Harazimova (born 1975), professional bodybuilder
- Zuzana Hejnová (born 1986)
- Šárka Kašpárková (born 1971)
- Jarmila Kratochvílová (born 1951)
- Věra Pospíšilová-Cechlová (born 1978)
- Roman Šebrle (born 1974)
- Barbora Špotáková (born 1981)
- Olga Winterberg (1922–2010), Israeli Olympian in the discus throw
- Emil Zátopek (1922–2010)
- Jan Železný (born 1966)

== Basketball ==
- Kamila Vodičková (born 1972), basketball player
- Jan Vesely (born 1990), basketball player
- Tomáš Satoranský (born 1991), basketball player

== Bat and ball sports ==
- Jakub Sládek (born 1990), baseball

== Biathlon ==
- Lucie Charvatova (born 1993)
- Jiřína Adamičková-Pelcová (born 1969)
- Roman Dostál (born 1970)
- Kateřina Holubcová (born 1976)
- Jan Matouš (born 1961)
- Ondřej Moravec (born 1984)
- Gabriela Soukalová (born 1989)
- Jaroslav Soukup (born 1982)
- Michal Šlesingr (born 1983)
- Jana Vápeníková (born 1964)
- Zdeněk Vítek (born 1977)
- Veronika Vítková (born 1988)

== Boxing ==
- Rudolf Kraj (born 1977)

== Canoeing ==
- Martin Doktor (born 1974)
- Josef Dostál (born 1993)
- Filip Dvořák (born 1988)
- Daniel Havel (born 1991)
- Štěpánka Hilgertová (born 1968)
- Josef Holeček (1921–2005)
- Vavřinec Hradilek (born 1987)
- Marek Jiras (born 1976)
- Bohuslav Karlík (1908–1996)
- Tereza Kneblova (born 2003)
- Martin Kolanda (born 1977)
- Tomáš Máder (born 1974)
- Lukáš Pollert (born 1970)
- Jiří Rohan (born 1964)
- Miroslav Šimek (born 1959)
- Ondřej Štěpánek (born 1979)
- Jan Štěrba (born 1981)
- Lukáš Trefil (born 1988)
- Jaroslav Volf (born 1979)

== Chess ==
- Vera Menchik (1906–1944), chess player
- Richard Réti (1889–1929), chess player
- Wilhelm Steinitz (1836–1900), first World Chess Champion
- David Navara (born 1985)

== Climbing ==
- Radek Jaroš (born 1964), mountain climber
- Adam Ondra (born 1993), rock climber
- Josef Rakoncaj (born 1951), mountain climber

== Cross-country skiing ==
- Lukáš Bauer (born 1977)
- Pavel Benc (born 1963)
- Martin Jakš (born 1986)
- Květa Jeriová (born 1956)
- Václav Korunka (born 1965)
- Martin Koukal (born 1978)
- Jiří Magál (born 1977)
- Kateřina Neumannová (born 1973)
- Radim Nyč (born 1959)
- Blanka Paulů (born 1954)
- Gabriela Svobodová (born 1953)
- Helena Šikolová (born 1949)
- Ladislav Švanda (born 1959)
- Dagmar Švubová (born 1958)

== Curling ==
- Jakub Bareš (born 1988)
- Jindřich Kitzberger (born 1981)
- Jiří Snítil (born 1975)
- Martin Snítil (born 1978)

== Cycling ==
- Jana Horáková (born 1983)
- Jaroslav Kulhavý (born 1985)
- Roman Kreuziger (born 1986), road bicycle race
- Romana Labounková (born 1989)

== Darts ==
- Pavel Korda (born 1971)

== Figure skating ==
- Petr Barna (born 1966)
- Michal Březina (born 1990)
- Hana Mašková (1949–1972)
- Tomáš Verner (born 1986)

== Football ==
- Martin Bačík (born 1989)
- Milan Baroš (born 1981)
- Patrik Berger (born 1973)
- Josef Bican (1913–2001)
- Petr Čech (born 1982)
- Miroslav Ceplák (born 1983)
- Vladimír Chaloupka (born 1976)
- Jaroslav Chlebek (born 1976)
- Martin Chorý (born 1970)
- Zdeněk Cieslar (born 1973)
- Radim Ditrich (born 1985)
- Pavel Elšík (born 1985)
- František Fadrhonc (1914–1981), football manager
- Petr Filipský (born 1985)
- Jan Hála (born 1996)
- Eva Haniaková (born 1954)
- Pavel Harazim (born 1969)
- Lukáš Hlavatý (born 1983)
- Petr Holota (born 1965)
- Dan Houdek (born 1989)
- Michal Houžvička (born 1987)
- Jiří Huška (born 1988)
- Bohumil Jelínek
- Vladislav Jelínek
- Ladislav Jetel (1886–1914)
- Václav Ježek (1923–1995), manager
- František Jirásek (1885–1941)
- David Jukl (born 1991)
- Josef Just (born 1973)
- Vlastimil Karal (born 1983)
- Miroslav Karas (born 1964)
- Václav Klán (born 1993)
- Zdeněk Klesnil (born 1986)
- Vašek Klouda
- Jan Koller (born 1973)
- Jan Kosak (born 1992)
- Petr Kostelník (born 1964)
- Martin Kotyza (born 1984)
- Lukáš Křeček (born 1986)
- Lenka Krömrová (born 1992)
- Jiří Krystan (born 1990)
- Radek Kuděla (born 1985)
- Miloslav Kufa (born 1971)
- Lukáš Landovský (born 1994)
- Andrei Lushnikov (born 1975)
- Ondřej Lysoněk (born 1986)
- Pavel Macháček (born 1977)
- Milan Machalický (born 1991)
- Ctibor Malý (1885–1968)
- Lukáš Marek (born 1981)
- Jan Martykán (born 1983)
- Jaroslav Marx (born 1971)
- Josef Masopust (1931–2015), manager
- Lukáš Matyska (born 1992)
- Lukáš Michal (born 1983)
- Lukáš Michna (born 1990)
- Pavel Nedvěd (born 1972)
- Lukáš Nechvátal (born 1981)
- Zdeněk Nehoda (born 1952)
- Oldřich Nejedlý (1909–1990)
- Daniel Nešpor (born 1987)
- Michal Ondráček (born 1973)
- Jan Palinek (born 1969)
- Antonín Panenka (born 1948)
- Michal Pávek (born 1985)
- Václav Pavlis (1930–2007)
- Jan Penc (born 1982)
- Jiří Petrů (born 1985)
- Jiří Perůtka (born 1988)
- David Petrus (born 1987)
- František Plánička (1904–1996)
- Karel Poborský (born 1972)
- Antonín Presl (born 1988)
- Martin Psohlavec (born 1981)
- Jiří Ptáček (born 1989)
- Tomáš Rosický (born 1980)
- Aleš Ryška (born 1972)
- Martin Sigmund (born 1982)
- Jaromír Šilhán (born 1983)
- Vladimír Šmicer (born 1973)
- David Sourada (born 1974)
- Antonín Spěvák (born 1971)
- Michal Šrom (born 1987)
- Václav Sršeň (1925–1996)
- Marcel Šťastný (born 1983)
- Tomáš Stráský (born 1987)
- Vít Štětina (born 1989)
- Jiří Studík (born 1985)
- Marcel Švejdík (born 1973)
- Martin Ticháček (born 1981), coach and former player
- Petr Tomašák (born 1986)
- Dalibor Vašenda (born 1991)
- Radim Vlasák (born 1974)
- Evžen Vohák (born 1975)
- Václav Winter (born 1976)
- Ivo Zbožínek (born 1977)
- Petr Zieris (born 1989)

== Freestyle skiing ==
- Stanley Hayer (born 1973)
- Tomáš Kraus (born 1974)
- Nikola Sudová (born 1982)
- Aleš Valenta (born 1973)

== Golf ==
- Jessica Korda (born 1993), American golfer; older daughter of Petr Korda
- Nelly Korda (born 1998), American golfer; younger daughter of Petr Korda

== Gymnastics ==
- Věra Čáslavská (1942–2016)

== Handball ==
- Filip Jícha (born 1982)
- Hana Mučková (born 1998)

== Ice hockey ==
- Tomáš Bartejs (born 1992)
- Jakub Bartoň (born 1981)
- Martin Belay (born 1991)
- Josef Beránek (born 1969)
- Daniel Boháč (born 1980)
- Jan Bojer (born 1989)
- Radek Bonk (born 1976)
- Daniel Branda (born 1976)
- Martin Buček (born 1986)
- Jan Bulis (born 1978)
- Petr Čajánek (born 1975)
- Jan Čaloun (born 1972)
- Zdeněk Čáp (born 1992)
- Filip Čech (born 1980)
- Roman Čechmánek (1971–2023)
- Jiří Charousek (born 1981)
- Roman Chlouba (born 1991)
- Klára Chmelová (born 1995)
- Filip Chytil (born 1999)
- Lukáš Cikánek (born 1988)
- Radek Číp (born 1992)
- Tomas Csabi (born 1984)
- Adam Dlouhý (born 1994)
- Martin Dočekal (born 1990)
- Jiří Dopita (born 1968)
- Lukáš Dostál (born 2000)
- Michal Dragoun (born 1983)
- Jan Dresler (born 1983)
- Jiří Drtina (born 1985)
- Miroslav Duben (born 1974)
- Martin Dudáš (born 1987)
- Tomáš Dujsík (born 1992)
- Ivan Ďurač (born 1997)
- Filip Dvořák (born 1976)
- Filip Dvořák (born 1997)
- Patrik Eliáš (born 1976)
- Lukáš Endál (born 1986)
- Martin Erat (born 1981)
- Jiří Ferebauer (born 1989)
- Tomáš Ficenc (born 1977)
- Lukáš Finsterle (born 1990)
- Jiří Fischer (born 1980)
- Patrik Flašar (born 1987)
- Martin Fous (born 1987)
- Ladislav Gengel (born 1981)
- Sebastian Gorčík (born 1995)
- Tomáš Gřeš (born 1996)
- Jan Hammerbauer (born 1993)
- Roman Hamrlík (born 1974)
- Martin Hanzal (born 1987)
- Dominik Hašek (born 1965)
- Jiří Hašek (born 1977)
- Milan Hejduk (born 1976)
- Aleš Hemský (born 1983)
- Martin Heřman (born 1987)
- Milan Hnilička (born 1973)
- Bobby Holík (born 1971)
- Jan Hranáč (born 1969)
- Dominik Hrníčko (born 1995)
- Filip Hronek (born 1997)
- Jan Hucl (born 1990)
- Patrik Husák (born 1990)
- Klára Hymlárová (born 1999)
- Jakub Illéš (born 1995)
- Jaromír Jágr (born 1972)
- Jaroslav Jágr (born 1984)
- Richard Jareš (born 1981)
- Jiří Jebavý (born 1989)
- Martin Jenáček (born 1975)
- Petr Jíra (born 1978)
- Vít Jonák (born 1991)
- Michal Jordán (born 1990)
- František Kaberle (born 1973)
- Tomáš Kaberle (born 1978)
- Kryštof Kafan (born 1990)
- Kristýna Kaltounková (born 2002)
- Jordan Karagavrilidis (born 1958)
- Tomáš Karpov (born 1989)
- Petr Kica (born 1986)
- Adam Klapka (born 2000)
- Lukáš Klimeš (born 1994)
- Ladislav Kohn (born 1975)
- Jakub Kolář (born 1992)
- Kristián Kolář (born 2000)
- Jakub Kotala (born 1996)
- Aleš Kotalík (born 1978)
- Petr Kousalík (born 1991)
- Vojtěch Kubinčák (born 1979)
- Róbert Krajči (born 1981)
- Lukáš Krajíček (born 1983)
- Tomáš Kramný (born 1973)
- David Krejčí (born 1986)
- Lukáš Krejčík (born 1990)
- Richard Kristl (born 1995)
- Lukáš Kříž (born 1993)
- Denisa Křížová (born 1994)
- Filip Kuba (born 1976)
- Karel Kubát (born 1988)
- Vladislav Kubeš (born 1978)
- Pavel Kubina (born 1977)
- František Kučera (born 1968)
- Jiří Kučný (born 1983)
- Martin Kupec (born 1988)
- Jiří Kurka (born 1994)
- Jaroslav Kůs (born 1990)
- Robert Lang (born 1970)
- Ondřej Látal (born 1981)
- Petr Leška (born 1975)
- Marek Loskot (born 1989)
- Marek Malík (born 1975)
- Ondřej Malinský (born 1983)
- Jakub Marek (born 1991)
- Rostislav Marosz (born 1991)
- Ondřej Martinka (born 1987)
- Martina Mašková (born 1998)
- Jiří Matějíček (born 1982)
- Jakub Maxa (born 1989)
- Marek Mazanec (born 1991)
- Martin Mazanec (born 1989)
- Milan Michálek (born 1984)
- Zbyněk Michálek (born 1982)
- Lukáš Mičulka (born 1989)
- Radek Míka (born 1984)
- Milan Mikulík (born 1980)
- Natálie Mlýnková (born 2001)
- Pavel Mojžíš (born 1977)
- David Moravec (born 1973)
- Petr Mrázek (born 1992)
- Kateřina Mrázová (born 1992)
- Tomáš Nádašdi (born 1980)
- Václav Nedomanský (born 1944)
- Petr Nedvěd (born 1971)
- Michal Nedvídek (born 1987)
- Roman Němeček (born 1980)
- Noemi Neubauerová (born 1999)
- Tomáš Nouza (born 1982)
- Jiří Novotný (born 1983)
- Rostislav Olesz (born 1985)
- Jiří Ondrušek (born 1986)
- Dominik Pacovský (born 1990)
- Ondřej Palát (born 1991)
- Tomáš Pastor (born 1992)
- David Pastrňák (born 1996)
- Pavel Patera (born 1971)
- Kristýna Pátková (born 1998)
- Michal Pavel (born 1986)
- Antonín Pechanec (born 1991)
- Radek Philipp (born 1977)
- Karel Plášek (born 1973)
- Jan Plodek (born 1978)
- Martin Podešva (born 1988)
- Jiří Polák (born 1977)
- Petr Polodna (born 1982)
- Patrik Poulíček (born 1993)
- Lukáš Poživil (born 1982)
- Libor Procházka (born 1974)
- Martin Procházka (born 1972)
- Milan Procházka (born 1977)
- Ondřej Procházka (born 1997)
- Roman Prošek (born 1980)
- Václav Prospal (born 1975)
- Tomáš Protivný (born 1986)
- Petr Průcha (born 1982)
- Jiří Půhoný (born 1992)
- Lukáš Pulpán (born 1985)
- Marek Račuk (born 1992)
- David Rangl (born 1988)
- Robert Reichel (born 1971)
- Martin Rejthar (born 1971)
- Lukáš Rindoš (born 1987)
- David Rittich (born 1992)
- Martin Ručinský (born 1971)
- Adam Rufer (born 1991)
- Vladimír Růžička (born 1963)
- Martin Rýgl (born 1986)
- Jiří Rys (born 1992)
- Dušan Salfický (born 1972)
- Marek Schwarz (born 1986)
- Michal Šeda (born 1982)
- Daniel Skalický (born 1991)
- Vladimír Škoda (born 1983)
- Josef Skořepa (born 1981)
- Miroslav Škumát (born 1987)
- Bohumil Slavíček (born 1991)
- Robert Slávik (born 1974)
- Jiří Šlégr (born 1971)
- Richard Šmehlík (born 1970)
- Rostislav Šnajnar (born 1997)
- Jaroslav Špaček (born 1974)
- Patrik Štefan (born 1980)
- Jakub Stehlík (born 1990)
- Jiří Stejskal (born 1982)
- Aleš Stezka (born 1997)
- Petr Stloukal (born 1993)
- Filip Stoklasa (born 1990)
- Martin Straka (born 1972)
- Vladimir Stransky (1947–2026)
- Matěj Stříteský (born 1990)
- Jakub Strnad (born 1992)
- Tomáš Štůrala (born 1985)
- Ondřej Švaňhal (born 1986)
- Filip Švaříček (born 1991)
- Petr Svoboda (born 1966)
- Petr Sýkora (born 1976)
- Tomáš Sýkora (born 1978)
- Dominik Tejnor (born 1994)
- Jiří Tlustý (born 1988)
- Milan Toman (born 1979)
- Vojtěch Tomi (born 1994)
- Jakub Trefný (born 1981)
- Miroslav Třetina (born 1980)
- Filip Turek (born 1972)
- Michal Tvrdík (born 1979)
- Tereza Vanišová (born 1996)
- Lukáš Vařecha (born 1990)
- Jaroslav Vlach (born 1992)
- Roman Vlach (born 1989)
- Daniel Vladař (born 1997)
- Milan Vobořil (born 1977)
- Tomáš Vokoun (born 1976)
- Lukáš Volf (born 1995)
- Tomáš Vondráček (born 1991)
- Jakub Voráček (born 1989)
- Lubomír Vosátko (born 1977)
- Jakub Vrána (born 1996)
- David Výborný (born 1975)
- Martin Vyrůbalík (born 1981)
- Jan Wasserbauer (born 1993)
- Ondrej Weissmann (born 1959)
- Michael Zacpálek (born 1991)
- Martin Záhorovský (born 1981)
- Lukáš Žalčík (born 1990)
- Jakub Zbořil (born 1997)
- Marek Židlický (born 1977)
- Pavel Zubíček (born 1974)

== Martial arts ==
- Jaromír Ježek (born 1986), judoka
- Vladimír Kocman (born 1956), judoka
- Lukáš Krpálek (born 1990), judoka
- Andrea Pažoutová (born 1979), judoka
- Karlos Vemola (born 1985), mixed martial artist, first Czech-born UFC fighter
- Josef Věnsek (born 1967), judoka
- Jiří Procházka (born 1992), first ever Czech-born UFC champion

== Modern Pentathlon ==
- Libor Capalini (born 1973)
- David Svoboda (born 1985)

== Motorsports ==
- Tomáš Enge (born 1976), Formula 1 driver
- Miroslav Fousek (1923–1993)
- Nicole Havrda (born 2006)
- Martin Hudec (born 1980)
- Jiří Janák (born 1983)
- Jaroslav Janiš (born 1983)
- Gabriela Jílková (born 1995)
- Eliška Junková (1900–1994), Grand Prix race car driver
- Jakub Klášterka (born 1994)
- Aliyyah Koloc (born 2004)
- Jan Kopecký (born 1982)
- Josef Král (born 1990)
- Filip Mareš (born 1991)
- Michal Matějovský (born 1985)
- Vasek Polak (1914–1997)
- Petr Ptáček (born 2002)
- Vojtěch Štajf (born 1974)
- Roman Staněk (born 2004)

== Polo ==
- Kurt Epstein (1904–1975), Olympic water polo player

== Rowing ==
- Jakub Hanák (born 1983)
- David Jirka (born 1982)
- Tomáš Karas (born 1975)
- Miroslava Knapková (born 1980)
- David Kopřiva (born 1979)
- Ondřej Synek (born 1982)

== Sailing ==
- Lenka Šmídová (born 1975)

== Shooting ==
- Kateřina Emmons (born 1983)
- David Kostelecký (born 1975)
- Petr Málek (1961–2019)
- Lenka Marušková (born 1985)
- Adéla Sýkorová (born 1987)
- Martin Tenk (born 1972)

== Ski jumping ==
- Rudolf Burkert (1904–1985)
- Tomáš Goder (born 1974)
- František Jež (born 1970)
- Jiří Malec (born 1962)
- Jiří Parma (born 1963)
- Pavel Ploc (born 1964)
- Jiří Raška (1941–2012)
- Jaroslav Sakala (born 1969)

== Snowboarding ==
- Ester Ledecká (born 1995)
- Šárka Pančochová (born 1990)
- Eva Samková (born 1993)

== Speed Skating ==
- Martina Sáblíková (born 1987)

== Swimming ==
- František Getreuer (1906–1945), swimmer and Olympic water polo player, killed in Dachau concentration camp
- Pavol Steiner (1908–1969), Olympic water polo player, swimmer, and cardiac surgeon
- Yvonne Tobis (born 1948), Israeli Olympic swimmer

== Table tennis ==
- Gertrude "Traute" Kleinová (1918–1976), 3-time table tennis world champion

== Tennis ==
- Tomáš Berdych (born 1985)
- František Čermák (born 1976)
- Martin Damm (born 1972)
- Jaroslav Drobný (1921–2001)
- Leoš Friedl (born 1977)
- Ladislav Hecht (1909–2004), Czechoslovak-American tennis player
- Andrea Hlaváčková (born 1986)
- Lucie Hradecká (born 1985)
- Jiří Javorský (1932–2002)
- Jan Kodeš (born 1946)
- Petr Korda (born 1968)
- Sebastian Korda (born 2000), American tennis player; son of Petr Korda
- Jan Koželuh (1904–1979)
- Karel Koželuh (1895–1950)
- Richard Krajicek (born 1971)
- Petra Kvitová (born 1990)
- Ivan Lendl (born 1960), Czech-American
- Hana Mandlíková (born 1962), Czech-Australian
- Regina Maršíková (born 1958)
- Iveta Melzer (born 1983)
- Martina Navratilova (born 1956), Czech-American
- Karel Nováček (born 1965)
- Jana Novotná (1968–2017)
- Květa Peschke (born 1975)
- Felix Pipes (1887–1983)
- Karolína Plíšková (born 1992)
- Hedwig Rosenbaum (1864–1939)
- Kateřina Siniaková (born 1996)
- Pavel Složil (born 1955)
- Cyril Suk (born 1967)
- Helena Suková (born 1965)
- Věra Suková (1931–1982)
- Tomáš Šmíd (born 1956)
- Radek Štěpánek (born 1978)
- Renáta Tomanová (born 1954)
- Daniel Vacek (born 1971)
- Nicole Vaidišová (born 1989)

== Triathlon ==
- Kateřina Dudková
- Hana Kolarova (born 1988)
- Jan Řehula (born 1973)

== Volleyball ==
- Ivana Cebáková (born 1986)
- Svetlana Cenkova (born 1966)
- Matyáš Jachnicki (born 1999)
- Adam Kozák (born 1999)
- Leona Neumannová (born 1987)
- Ondřej Perušič (born 1994)
- David Schweiner (born 1994)
- Kamila Spáčilová (born 1988)

== Water polo ==
- František Getreuer (1906–1945), swimmer and Olympic water polo player, killed in Dachau concentration camp
- Pavol Steiner (1908–1969), Olympic water polo player, swimmer, and cardiac surgeon

== See also ==
- Sport in the Czech Republic
- Czech Republic at the Olympics
- Czech Republic at the Paralympics
