= Michna =

Michna is a surname. Notable people with the surname include:

- Adrian Michna, American musician
- Lukáš Michna (born 1990), Czech footballer
- Marta Michna (born 1978), Polish chess player
- Russ Michna (born 1981), American football player

== See also ==
- Adam Michna z Otradovic (1600–1676), Czech poet
