= Jiří Rys =

Czech ice hockey player

- Born: March 31, 1992 (age 32); Czechoslovakia
- Height: 6 ft 0 in (183 cm)
- Weight: 185 lb (84 kg; 13 st 3 lb)
- Position: Forward
- Shoots: Right
- Czech Extraliga team: HC Pardubice
- NHL draft: Undrafted
- Playing career: 2012–present

Jiří Rys (born March 31, 1992) is a Czech professional ice hockey player. He currently plays with HC Pardubice of the Czech Extraliga.

Rys made his Czech Extraliga debut playing with BK Mlada Boleslav during the 2011–12 Czech Extraliga season.
