= Radek Philipp =

Czech ice hockey player

- Born: February 12, 1977 (age 48); Ostrava, Czechoslovakia
- Height: 6 ft 2 in (188 cm)
- Weight: 205 lb (93 kg; 14 st 9 lb)
- Position: Defence
- Shot: Left
- Played for: HC Havířov; HC Vítkovice Steel; Lahti Pelicans; Espoo Blues; Salavat Yulaev Ufa; HC Košice; Luleå HF; Avtomobilist Yekaterinburg; HC Sparta Praha
- National team: Czech Republic
- Playing career: 1997–2016

Radek Philipp (born February 12, 1977) is a Czech professional ice hockey player with the HC Sparta Praha team in the Czech Extraliga.

== Career statistics ==
			Regular season					Playoffs
Season	Team	League	GP	G	A	Pts	PIM	GP	G	A	Pts	PIM
1996–97	HS Kroměříž U20	Czech U20 2	23	5	3	8	—	—	—	—	—	—
1997–98	HC Havirov	Czech2	51	2	6	8	—	—	—	—	—	—
1998–99	HC Vitkovice	Czech	46	1	2	3	38	4	0	0	0	4
1999–00	HC Vitkovice	Czech	18	0	2	2	24	—	—	—	—	—
1999–00	HC Havířov	Czech	31	1	2	3	38	—	—	—	—	—
2000–01	HC Vitkovice	Czech	52	0	11	11	40	10	1	1	2	14
2001–02	HC Vitkovice	Czech	48	0	2	2	64	14	0	1	1	16
2002–03	HC Vitkovice	Czech	52	8	11	19	34	5	1	0	1	18
2003–04	Lahti Pelicans	SM-Liiga	43	1	4	5	61	—	—	—	—	—
2003–04	Espoo Blues	SM-Liiga	9	0	1	1	2	8	0	1	1	2
2004–05	HC Vitkovice	Czech	50	1	12	13	80	12	0	1	1	14
2005–06	HC Vitkovice	Czech	49	5	8	13	86	6	0	0	0	10
2006–07	Salavat Yulaev Ufa	Russia	53	2	6	8	54	8	1	0	1	27
2007–08	Salavat Yulaev Ufa	Russia	46	0	2	2	40	6	0	0	0	0
2008–09	HC Košice	Slovak	3	1	1	2	8	—	—	—	—	—
2008–09	Luleå HF	Elitserien	54	4	7	11	50	5	0	0	0	8
2009–10	Avtomobilist Yekaterinburg	KHL	29	2	7	9	42	—	—	—	—	—
2009–10	HC Sparta Praha	Czech	16	0	5	5	41	7	0	0	0	4
2010–11	HC Sparta Praha	Czech	52	4	4	8	74	—	—	—	—	—
2011–12	HC Sparta Praha	Czech	51	3	10	13	86	5	0	0	0	2
2012–13	HC Sparta Praha	Czech	52	1	5	6	34	7	0	0	0	4
2013–14	HC Sparta Praha	Czech	46	1	5	6	58	11	0	1	1	2
2014–15	HC Košice	Slovak	55	1	12	13	28	17	0	1	1	14
2015–16	HC Košice	Slovak	10	0	1	1	6	—	—	—	—	—
2015–16	HC Vitkovice	Czech	14	0	2	2	31	—	—	—	—	—
Czech totals			577	25	81	106	728	94	2	8	10	100
