= Ondřej Martinka =

Czech ice hockey player

Ondrej Martinka
- Born: May 3, 1987 (age 37); Most, Czechoslovakia
- Height: 6 ft 3 in (191 cm)
- Weight: 220 lb (100 kg; 15 st 10 lb)
- Position: Defence
- Shot: Right
- Played for: HC Dukla Jihlava; HC Most; IHC Písek; Flint Generals; HC Litvínov; HC Stadion Litoměřice; Titan Klin; Scorpions de Mulhouse; Diables Rouges de Briançon; Corsaires de Nantes
- Playing career: 2006–2021

Ondřej Martinka (born May 3, 1987) is a Czech professional ice hockey defenceman. He played with HC Litvínov in the Czech Extraliga during the 2010–11 Czech Extraliga season.

== Career statistics ==
			Regular season					Playoffs
Season	Team	League	GP	G	A	Pts	PIM	GP	G	A	Pts	PIM
2001–02	HC Litvínov U18	Czech U18	10	0	1	1	2	—	—	—	—	—
2002–03	HC Litvínov U18	Czech U18	43	0	2	2	34	—	—	—	—	—
2003–04	HC Litvínov U18	Czech U18	51	3	8	11	62	—	—	—	—	—
2003–04	Bili Tygri Liberec U18	Czech U18	1	0	0	0	25	—	—	—	—	—
2003–04	HC Olomouc U18	Czech U18	1	0	0	0	27	—	—	—	—	—
2003–04	HC Chemopetrol U20	Czech U20	1	0	1	1	2	—	—	—	—	—
2005–06	HC Chemopetrol U20	Czech U20	38	2	15	17	114	—	—	—	—	—
2006–07	HC Chemopetrol U20	Czech U20	38	2	15	17	114	—	—	—	—	—
2006–07	HC Dukla Jihlava U20	Czech U20	5	0	3	3	2	—	—	—	—	—
2006–07	HC Dukla Jihlava	Czech2	6	0	0	0	4	4	0	0	0	2
2006–07	HC Most	Czech3	7	0	2	2	4	—	—	—	—	—
2007–08	HC Dukla Jihlava	Czech2	31	0	4	4	46	5	0	0	0	4
2008–09	IHC Písek	Czech3	29	2	4	6	32	2	0	0	0	0
2009–10	Flint Generals	IHL	11	0	1	1	8	—	—	—	—	—
2009–10	HC Most	Czech3	12	2	5	7	28	15	7	4	11	14
2010–11	HC Litvínov	Czech	2	0	0	0	2	8	1	0	1	10
2010–11	HC Stadion Litoměřice	Czech2	43	1	7	8	34	—	—	—	—	—
2011–12	Titan Klin	VHL	13	1	0	1	58	—	—	—	—	—
2011–12	HC Stadion Litoměřice	Czech2	34	0	5	5	59	—	—	—	—	—
2011–12	HC Litvínov	Czech	1	0	0	0	2	—	—	—	—	—
2012–13	HC Stadion Litoměřice	Czech2	51	3	9	12	42	—	—	—	—	—
2012–13	HC Litvínov	Czech	8	0	2	2	4	—	—	—	—	—
2013–14	Scorpions de Mulhouse	France2	22	1	12	13	38	6	0	2	2	4
2014–15	Scorpions de Mulhouse	France2	24	0	13	13	28	3	1	0	1	2
2015–16	Scorpions de Mulhouse	France2	25	4	10	14	42	3	1	0	1	0
2016–17	Diables Rouges de Briançon	France2	24	1	8	9	26	3	0	0	0	6
2017–18	Corsaires de Nantes	France2	26	2	8	10	10	8	0	0	0	22
2018–19	Corsaires de Nantes	France2	24	1	4	5	46	—	—	—	—	—
2019–20	Corsaires de Nantes	France2	25	0	9	9	12	3	0	0	0	0
2020–21	Corsaires de Nantes	France2	8	0	0	0	6	1	0	0	0	0
Czech totals			11	0	2	2	8	8	1	0	1	10
Czech2 totals			165	4	25	29	185	9	0	0	0	6
France2 totals			178	9	64	73	208	27	2	2	4	34
