= Jakub Marek =

Czech ice hockey player

Jakup Marek
- Born: June 22, 1991 (age 34) Czechoslovakia
- Height: 5 ft 10 in (178 cm)
- Weight: 158 lb (72 kg; 11 st 4 lb)
- Position: Forward
- Shoots: Left
- Bayernliga team Former teams: EHC Waldkraiburg; Motor České Budějovice; Mountfield HK
- Playing career: 2011–present

Jakub Marek (born June 22, 1991) is a Czech professional ice hockey player. He is currently playing for EHC Waldkraiburg of the Bayernliga.

Marek made his Czech Extraliga debut playing with Motor České Budějovice during the 2011-12 Czech Extraliga season.
