= Jiří Půhoný =

Czech ice hockey player

- Born: August 27, 1992 (age 32); Czechoslovakia
- Height: 6 ft 1 in (185 cm)
- Weight: 183 lb (83 kg; 13 st 1 lb)
- Position: Forward
- Shoots: Left
- Czech Extraliga team: HC Pardubice
- NHL draft: Undrafted
- Playing career: 2011–present

Jiří Půhoný (born August 27, 1992) is a Czech professional ice hockey player. He currently plays with HC Pardubice of the Czech Extraliga.

Půhoný made his Czech Extraliga debut playing with HC Pardubice during the 2011–12 Czech Extraliga season.
