= Petr Kousalík =

Czech ice hockey player

Petr Kousalik
- Born: February 7, 1991 (age 34); Brno, Czechoslovakia
- Height: 5 ft 11 in (180 cm)
- Weight: 190 lb (86 kg; 13 st 8 lb)
- Position: Defence
- Shot: Left
- Czech Extraliga team: HC Litvínov
- Playing career: 2009–2020

Petr Kousalík (born February 7, 1991, in Brno) is a Czech professional ice hockey defenceman. He played with HC Litvínov in the Czech Extraliga during the 2010–11 Czech Extraliga season.

== Career statistics ==
			Regular season					Playoffs
Season	Team	League	GP	G	A	Pts	PIM	GP	G	A	Pts	PIM
2005–06	HC Kometa Brno U18	Czech U18	18	2	1	3	10	—	—	—	—	—
2006–07	HC Kometa Brno U18	Czech U18	42	1	9	10	74	2	0	1	1	4
2007–08	HC Litvinov U18	Czech U18	44	7	7	14	59	—	—	—	—	—
2008–09	HC Litvinov U20	Czech U20	45	1	11	12	28	9	0	2	2	8
2009–10	HC Litvinov U20	Czech U20	52	9	20	29	34	8	3	5	8	6
2009–10	HC Litvinov	Czech	6	0	0	0	4	2	0	0	0	4
2010–11	HC Litvinov U20	Czech U20	26	3	7	10	28	2	0	1	1	14
2010–11	HC Litvinov	Czech	27	0	0	0	6	—	—	—	—	—
2010–11	HC Stadion Litoměřice	Czech2	4	0	0	0	0	—	—	—	—	—
2011–12	HC Litvinov	Czech	47	0	4	4	30	—	—	—	—	—
2011–12	HC Slovan Ústečtí Lvi	Czech2	—	—	—	—	—	2	0	0	0	2
2012–13	HC Litvinov U20	Czech U20	1	0	0	0	0	—	—	—	—	—
2012–13	HC Litvinov	Czech	38	1	3	4	38	7	0	1	1	6
2012–13	HC Most	Czech2	—	—	—	—	—	—	—	—	—	—
2013–14	HC Litvinov	Czech	39	2	2	4	48	—	—	—	—	—
2013–14	HC Most	Czech2	3	0	0	0	10	—	—	—	—	—
2014–15	HC Litvinov	Czech	6	0	1	1	8	—	—	—	—	—
2014–15	HC Most	Czech2	45	1	12	13	44	—	—	—	—	—
2014–15	HC Banska Bystrica	Slovak	5	1	0	1	6	18	1	2	3	14
2015–16	Orli Znojmo	EBEL	14	1	2	3	6	—	—	—	—	—
2015–16	HC Nove Zamky	Slovak2	14	1	6	7	20	—	—	—	—	—
2016–17	HC Spartak Choceň	Czech4	13	2	7	9	4	—	—	—	—	—
2017–18	HC Spartak Choceň	Czech4	26	5	9	14	71	8	0	5	5	16
2018–19	HC Spartak Choceň	Czech4	18	3	10	13	58	4	1	0	1	22
2019–20	TJ Sokol Brezina	Czech4	2	1	0	1	2	—	—	—	—	—
Czech totals			163	3	10	13	134	9	0	1	1	10
