= Adam Rufer =

Czech ice hockey player

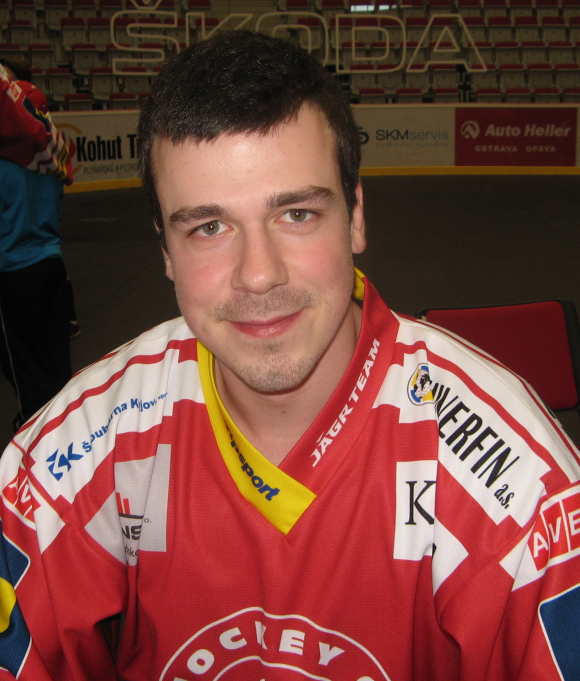
- Born: September 3, 1991 (age 34) Czech Republic
- Height: 5 ft 11 in (180 cm)
- Weight: 183 lb (83 kg; 13 st 1 lb)
- Position: Forward
- Shot: Left
- Czech team Former teams: HC Oceláři Třinec; TH Unia Oświęcim Cracovia (ice hockey)
- NHL draft: Undrafted
- Playing career: 2011–2020

Adam Rufer (born September 3, 1991) is a Czech professional ice hockey player. He played forward for HC Oceláři Třinec of the Czech Extraliga, until his trade to Unia Oswiecim in 2017, and then to Krakow in 2018. He continued to play forward position for these teams until retiring in 2020. Adam Rufer has a trading card for the HC Oceláři Třinec team. He is card #222 in the Trading Card Database.

Rufer made his Czech Extraliga debut playing with HC Oceláři Třinec during the 2011–12 Czech Extraliga season. He scored a total of 27 starts for the Třinec team in his first season. Later in his career, in the Champion's Hockey League match against Friborg-Gotteron, he scored 1 point for HC Oceláři Třinec.

Adam Rufer's views on his team's performance are centered on teamwork and individual effort. During an interview on a game in which his team lost, he stated, "Coaches don't have time to change the whole system or overhaul our game. They're more like supporting us. They're trying to clear our heads so we can make some changes."

== See also ==
- HC Oceláři Třinec
- TH Unia Oświęcim
- Cracovia (ice hockey)
