= David Rangl =

Czech ice hockey player

- Born: March 23, 1988 (age 37); Brno, Czechoslovakia
- Height: 6 ft 0 in (183 cm)
- Weight: 212 lb (96 kg; 15 st 2 lb)
- Position: Defence
- Shot: Left
- Czech Extraliga team: HC Oceláři Třinec
- Playing career: 2008–2015

David Rangl (born March 23, 1988) is a Czech professional ice hockey defenceman. He played with HC Oceláři Třinec in the Czech Extraliga during the 2008–09 Czech Extraliga season.

== Career statistics ==
			Regular season					Playoffs
Season	Team	League	GP	G	A	Pts	PIM	GP	G	A	Pts	PIM
2001–02	HC Kometa Brno U18	Czech U18	5	0	0	0	2	—	—	—	—	—
2002–03	HC Kometa Brno U18	Czech U18	42	4	5	9	67	—	—	—	—	—
2002–03	HC Kometa Brno U20	Czech U20	2	0	0	0	0	—	—	—	—	—
2003–04	HC Zlin U18	Czech U18	43	6	6	12	76	6	1	0	1	4
2004–05	HC Zlin U18	Czech U18	30	5	10	15	52	—	—	—	—	—
2004–05	HC Zlin U20	Czech U20	1	0	0	0	2	—	—	—	—	—
2004–05	HC Kometa Brno U20	Czech U20	14	0	1	1	10	—	—	—	—	—
2005–06	HC Oceláři Třinec U20	Czech U20	46	3	4	7	60	3	0	0	0	2
2006–07	HC Oceláři Třinec U20	Czech U20	34	1	9	10	56	5	0	1	1	16
2006–07	HC Frýdek-Místek U20	Czech U20	2	0	0	0	2	—	—	—	—	—
2007–08	HC Oceláři Třinec U20	Czech U20	36	4	10	14	110	3	1	0	1	2
2007–08	HK Jestřábi Prostějov	Czech2	6	0	1	1	2	—	—	—	—	—
2008–09	HC Oceláři Třinec	Czech	19	0	2	2	16	1	0	0	0	0
2008–09	HC Havířov Panthers	Czech2	8	0	1	1	14	—	—	—	—	—
2008–09	HC Poruba	Czech2	13	0	0	0	8	—	—	—	—	—
2009–10	HC Oceláři Třinec	Czech	—	—	—	—	—	—	—	—	—	—
2009–10	HC Sumperk	Czech2	7	0	0	0	18	—	—	—	—	—
2009–10	HC Havířov Panthers	Czech2	20	0	3	3	20	—	—	—	—	—
2010–11	HC Oceláři Třinec	Czech	—	—	—	—	—	—	—	—	—	—
2010–11	Orli Znojmo	Czech2	36	1	2	3	46	6	0	0	0	4
2011–12	SK Horácká Slavia Třebíč	Czech2	49	6	11	17	52	1	0	0	0	0
2012–13	SK Horácká Slavia Třebíč	Czech2	47	3	19	22	76	10	1	2	3	10
2013–14	SK Horácká Slavia Třebíč	Czech2	17	0	1	1	20	—	—	—	—	—
2014–15	SKMB Boskovice	Czech4	3	0	0	0	4	—	—	—	—	—
Czech totals			19	0	2	2	16	1	0	0	0	0
Czech2 totals			203	10	38	48	256	26	3	4	7	26
