= Jan Hammerbauer =

Czech ice hockey player

- Born: April 15, 1993 (age 31); Czech Republic
- Height: 6 ft 2 in (188 cm)
- Weight: 194 lb (88 kg; 13 st 12 lb)
- Position: Forward
- Shoots: Left
- Czech Extraliga team: Piráti Chomutov
- NHL draft: Undrafted
- Playing career: 2013–present

Jan Hammerbauer (born April 15, 1993) is a Czech professional ice hockey player. He currently plays with Piráti Chomutov in the Czech Extraliga.

Hammerbauer made his Czech Extraliga debut playing with Piráti Chomutov debut during the 2013–14 Czech Extraliga season.
