= Eva Haniaková =

Czech footballer and coach

Personal information
- Date of birth: 6 May 1954 (age 72)
- Position: Sweeper

Senior career*
Years	Team	Apps	(Gls)
1969–1990	Slavia Praha		
1990–2000	DFC Heidenreichstein		
2000–2002	Sokol Řevnice		

International career^{‡}
- Czechoslovakia
- * Club domestic league appearances and goals as of 11:32, 6 September 2019 (UTC) ‡ National team caps and goals as of 11:32, 6 September 2019 (UTC)

Eva Haniaková (born 6 May 1954) is a Czech football coach and former player, who was a defender for the Czechoslovakia national team. At club level she represented Slavia Praha and DFC Heidenreichstein.

== Playing career ==
Haniaková was part of the first official Czechoslovak team in 1985 and played at the 1988 FIFA Women's Invitation Tournament.

== Coaching career ==
Despite her long association with Slavia, Haniaková was employed as a youth team coach by rivals Sparta Prague. She also served as head coach of the Czech Republic women's national under-17 football team. In 2014 she was given the Václav Jíra Award by the Football Association of the Czech Republic.
