= Kryštof Kafan =

Czech ice hockey player

- Born: February 4, 1990 (age 35); Litvínov, Czechoslovakia
- Height: 6 ft 2 in (188 cm)
- Weight: 190 lb (86 kg; 13 st 8 lb)
- Position: Forward
- Shot: Left
- Played for: HC Litvínov
- Playing career: 2009–2017

Kryštof Kafan (born February 4, 1990) is a Czech former professional ice hockey player. He played nine regular season games with HC Litvínov in the Czech Extraliga. He also played in the Polska Hokej Liga for GKS Katowice, the FFHG Division 1 for Remparts de Tours and the English Premier Ice Hockey League for the Bracknell Bees.
