= David Sourada =

Czech footballer

Personal information
- Date of birth: 16 November 1974 (age 51)
- Place of birth: Czechoslovakia
- Height: 1.85 m (6 ft 1 in)
- Position: Striker

Youth career
- Baník Havířov

Senior career*
Years	Team	Apps	(Gls)
?–1999	TJ Vítkovice		
1999–2001	FK Teplice	5	(0)
2001–2003	FK Chmel Blšany	65	(13)
2004	FC Terek Grozny	12	(0)
2005–2008	FK Chmel Blšany		
2008–2009	MFK Karviná		
- * Club domestic league appearances and goals

David Sourada (born 16 November 1974) is a Czech footballer who last played for MFK Karviná.
