= Václav Klán =

Czech footballer

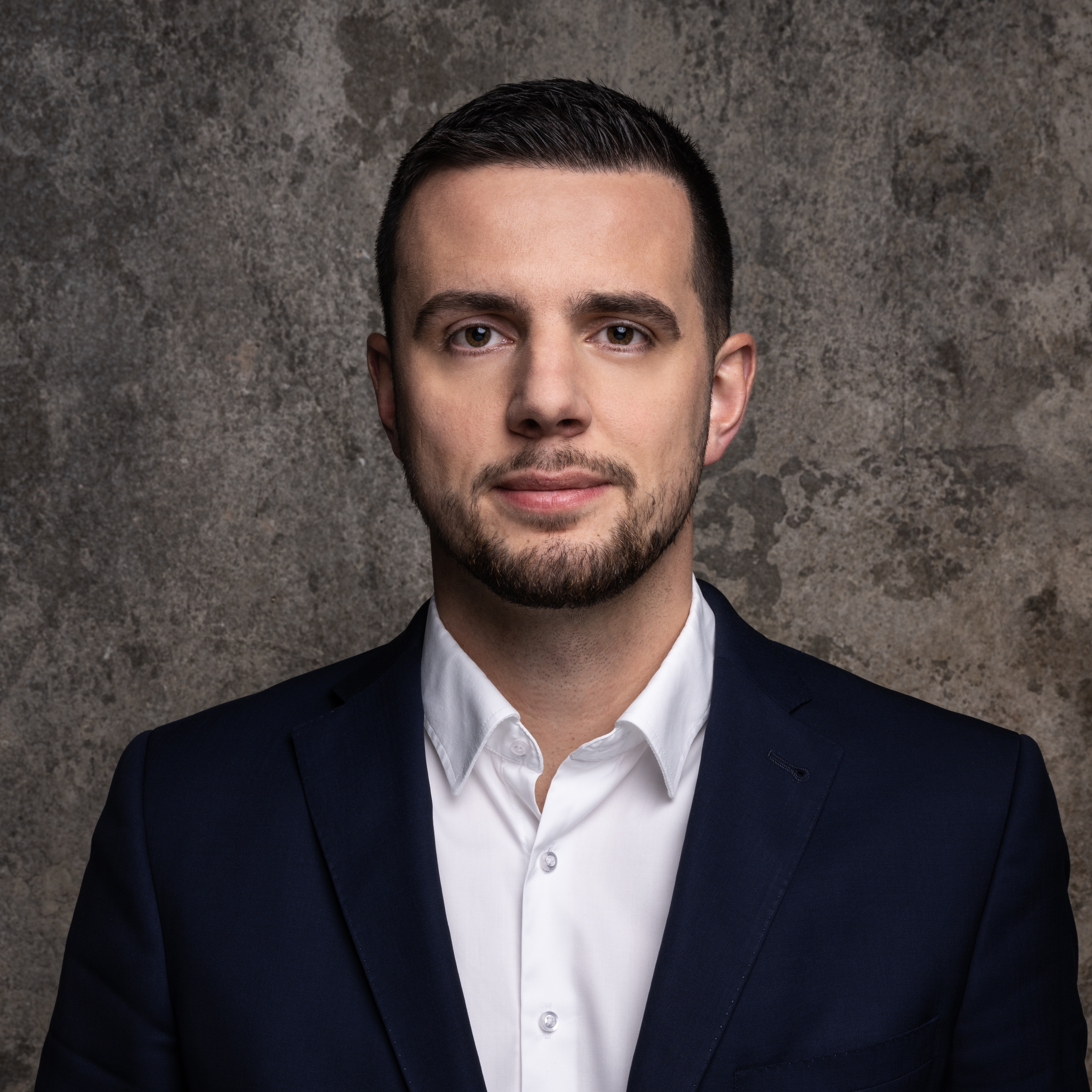

Personal information
- Full name: Václav Klán
- Date of birth: 7 September 1993 (age 33)
- Place of birth: Prague, Czech Republic
- Height: 1.97 m (6 ft 5 1/2 in)
- Position: Forward

Team information
- Current team: SK Uhelné sklady Prague
- Number: 26

Youth career
- 2000–2003: FK Řeporyje
- 2003–2008: SK Motorlet Prague
- 2008–2009: Bohemians 1905
- 2009–2012: AC Sparta Prague

Senior career*
Years	Team	Apps	(Gls)
2012–2015	AC Sparta Prague	0	(0)
2012	→ FK Bohemians Prague (loan)	6	(0)
2012–2013	→ Vlašim (loan)	16	(0)
2013–2015	→ Loko Vltavín (loan)	16	(2)
2015–2016	FC Zbrojovka Brno	2	(0)
2016	→ FK Viktoria Žižkov (loan)	26	(3)
2017–	SK Uhelné sklady Prague		
- * Club domestic league appearances and goals as of 4 April 2017

Václav Klán (born 7 September 1993) is a Czech football player who currently plays for SK Uhelné sklady Prague.
