= Lukáš Cikánek =

Czech ice hockey player

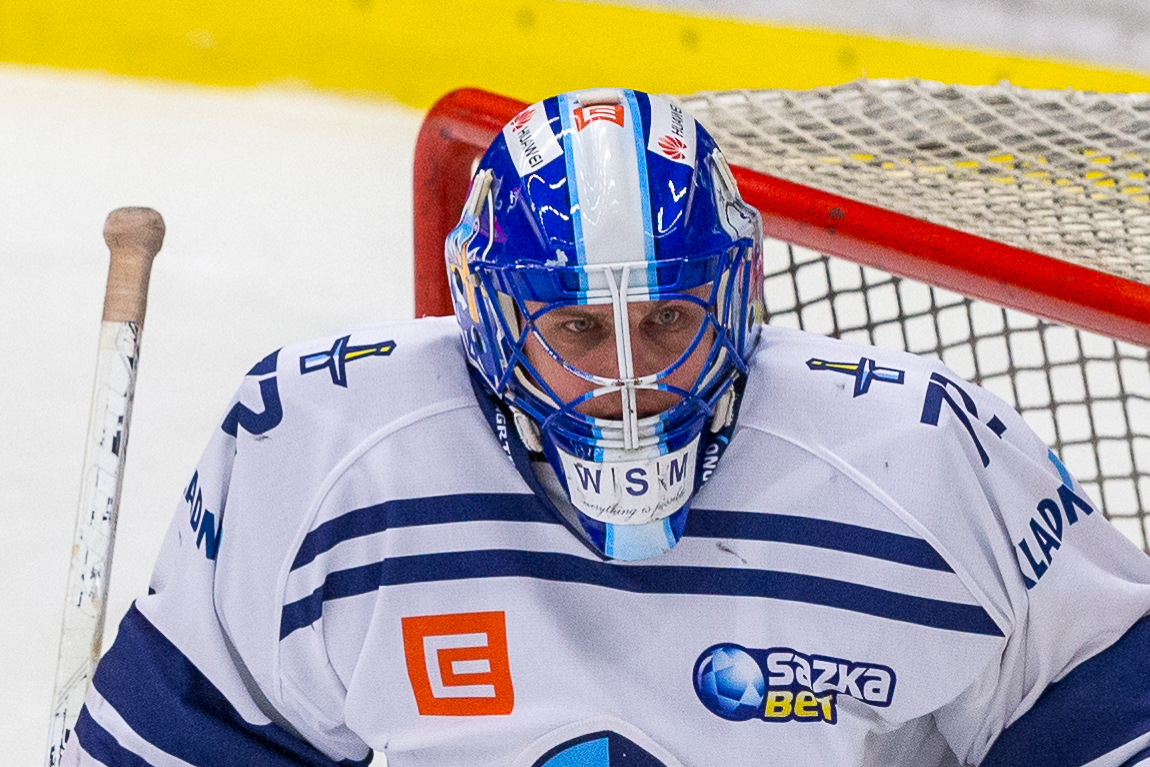
- Born: January 9, 1988 (age 38) Kladno, Czechoslovakia
- Height: 6 ft 1 in (185 cm)
- Weight: 196 lb (89 kg; 14 st 0 lb)
- Position: Goaltender
- Catches: Right
- EBEL team Former teams: Orli Znojmo; HC Kladno
- Playing career: 2007–present

Lukáš Cikánek (born January 9, 1988) is a Czech professional ice hockey goaltender currently playing for Orli Znojmo, a Czech-based team in the Austrian Hockey League, the top-tier league in Austria. Previously, he played five seasons with HC Kladno in the Czech Extraliga.
