= Martin Belay =

Czech professional ice hockey player

- Born: March 15, 1991 (age 34); Ostrava, Czechoslovakia
- Height: 5 ft 10 in (178 cm)
- Weight: 170 lb (77 kg; 12 st 2 lb)
- Position: Forward
- Shoots: Left
- Czech Extraliga team: BK Mladá Boleslav
- Playing career: 2010–present

Martin Belay (born March 15, 1991) is a Czech professional ice hockey player. He played with BK Mladá Boleslav in the Czech Extraliga during the 2010–11 Czech Extraliga season.
