= Matyáš Jachnicki =

Czech volleyball player (born 1999)

Personal information
- Nationality: Czech
- Born: 16 May 1999 (age 27)
- Height: 6 ft 5 in (1.95 m)

Volleyball information
- Position: Outside spiker
- Current club: (Czech Republic) VK Kladno
- Number: 12

Career
Years	Teams
2018-	(Czech Republic) VK Kladno

Matyáš Jachnicki (born 16 May 1999) is a Czech volleyball player, a member of the club VK Kladno.
