= Lukáš Rindoš =

Czech ice hockey player

Lukas Rindos
- Born: August 23, 1987 (age 37); Chomutov, Czechoslovakia
- Height: 6 ft 1 in (185 cm)
- Weight: 176 lb (80 kg; 12 st 8 lb)
- Position: Forward
- Shoots: Left
- team Former teams: Free agent HC Litvínov
- Playing career: 2005–present

Lukas Rindos (born August 23, 1987) is a Czech professional ice hockey player.

He played six seasons in the Czech Extraliga with HC Litvínov, playing 142 games in total.
