= Jiří Ferebauer =

- Born: February 18, 1989 (age 36); České Budějovice, Czechoslovakia
- Height: 6 ft 0 in (183 cm)
- Weight: 176 lb (80 kg; 12 st 8 lb)
- Position: Forward
- Shoots: Left
- Czech Extraliga team: HC České Budějovice
- Playing career: 2009–present

Jiří Ferebauer (born February 18, 1989) is a Czech professional ice hockey player. He played with HC České Budějovice in the Czech Extraliga during the 2010–11 Czech Extraliga season.

== Career statistics ==
			Regular season					Playoffs
Season	Team	League	GP	G	A	Pts	PIM	GP	G	A	Pts	PIM
2007–08	HC Tabor	Czech3	2	1	0	1	0	3	2	0	2	2
2008–09	HC Ceske Budejovice	Czech	1	0	0	0	0	4	0	0	0	0
2008–09	SK Horacka Slavia Trebic	Czech2	6	0	0	0	6	—	—	—	—	—
2008–09	HC Tabor	Czech3	10	3	3	6	2	2	0	0	0	0
2009–10	BK Mlada Boleslav	Czech	7	0	1	1	0	2	0	0	0	2
2009–10	HC Tabor	Czech2	13	2	0	2	2	1	0	0	0	0
2009–10	NED Hockey Nymburk	Czech3	4	2	1	3	0	—	—	—	—	—
2010–11	HC Ceske Budejovice	Czech	5	1	0	1	0	—	—	—	—	—
2010–11	IHC Pisek	Czech2	40	10	10	20	14	—	—	—	—	—
2011–12	IHC Pisek	Czech2	50	8	3	11	12	9	4	4	8	2
2012–13	IHC Pisek	Czech2	39	4	6	10	20	4	0	0	0	0
2013–14	HC Ceske Budejovice	Czech2	52	7	5	12	10	7	1	0	1	0
2014–15	LHK Jestřábi Prostějov	Czech2	1	0	0	0	4	—	—	—	—	—
2014–15	KLH Jindrichuv Hradec	Czech2	6	1	1	2	14	—	—	—	—	—
2014–15	HC Tabor	Czech3	1	0	1	1	2	—	—	—	—	—
2014–15	HC Tabor B	Czech4	2	0	0	0	0	—	—	—	—	—
2015–16	IHC Pisek	Czech3	27	4	12	16	4	—	—	—	—	—
Czech totals			13	1	1	2	0	6	0	0	0	2
Czech2 totals			201	31	24	55	68	21	5	4	9	2
