= Martin Fous =

Czech professional ice hockey goaltender

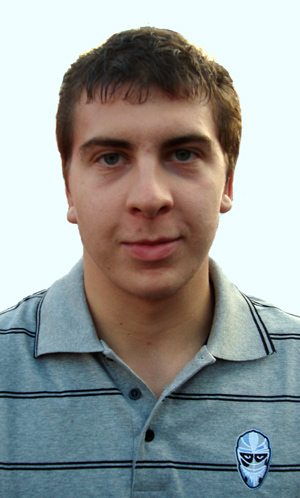
- Born: January 14, 1987 (age 38); Šumperk, Czechoslovakia
- Height: 5 ft 9 in (175 cm)
- Weight: 159 lb (72 kg; 11 st 5 lb)
- Position: Goaltender
- Catches: Left
- DEL team: EHC Wolfsburg
- NHL draft: Undrafted
- Playing career: 2009–present

Martin Fous (born January 14, 1987) is a Czech professional ice hockey goaltender. He is currently playing for EHC Wolfsburg in the Deutsche Eishockey Liga (DEL).
