= Lukáš Mičulka =

Czech ice hockey player

- Born: 8 April 1989 (age 37) Kopřivnice, Czechoslovakia
- Height: 6 ft 1 in (185 cm)
- Weight: 176 lb (80 kg; 12 st 8 lb)
- Position: Forward
- Shoots: Left
- Czech Extraliga team: HC Oceláři Třinec
- Playing career: 2009–present

Lukáš Mičulka (born 8 April 1989 in Kopřivnice) is a Czech professional ice hockey player. He played with HC Oceláři Třinec in the Czech Extraliga during the 2010–11 Czech Extraliga season.
