= Lukáš Volf =

Czech ice hockey player

- Born: July 28, 1995 (age 29); Czech Republic
- Height: 6 ft 1 in (185 cm)
- Weight: 211 lb (96 kg; 15 st 1 lb)
- Position: Forward
- Shoots: Left
- Czech team: BK Mladá Boleslav
- Playing career: 2014–present

Lukáš Volf (born July 28, 1995) is a Czech professional ice hockey forward playing for BK Mladá Boleslav of the Czech Extraliga.

Volf made his Czech Extraliga debut with BK Mladá Boleslav during the 2014–15 Czech Extraliga season.
