= Miroslav Karas =

Czech former footballer (born 1964)

Personal information
- Date of birth: 29 October 1964 (age 62)
- Place of birth: Czechoslovakia
- Height: 1.83 m (6 ft 0 in)
- Position: Defender

Senior career*
Years	Team	Apps	(Gls)
1986–1992	Vítkovice	97	(4)
1993–1995	Haka	54	(10)
1996–1998	Vítkovice		
- Třinec
- Senica

Managerial career
- 2013–2014: Vítkovice
- * Club domestic league appearances and goals

Miroslav Karas (born 29 October 1964) is a Czech football coach and a former professional football player who played as a defender. In his native Czechoslovakia and Czech Republic he represented Vítkovice. During 1993–1995, he played in Finnish Veikkausliiga with Haka, helping the club to win the Finnish championship title in 1995. He also played in Slovakia for Senica.

After his playing career, he has also coached Vítkovice.

== Honours ==
Haka

- Veikkausliiga: 1995
