= Petr Stloukal =

Czech ice hockey player

- Born: June 18, 1993 (age 32) Brno, Czech Republic
- Height: 5 ft 10 in (178 cm)
- Weight: 181 lb (82 kg; 12 st 13 lb)
- Position: Forward
- Shoots: Left
- team Former teams: Free Agent; HIFK
- NHL draft: Undrafted
- Playing career: 2012–present

Petr Stloukal (born June 18, 1993) is a Czech professional ice hockey player. He is currently an Unrestricted Free Agent after previously playing with HC Keski-Uusimaa in the Finnish Mestis on loan from HIFK.

Stloukal made his Liiga debut playing with HIFK during the 2013–14 Liiga season.
