= Adam Kozák =

Czech volleyball player (born 1999)

Personal information
- Nationality: Czech
- Born: 11 June 1999 (age 27)
- Height: 6 ft 4 in (1.94 m)
- Weight: 172 lb (78 kg)
- Spike: 135 in (344 cm)
- Block: 131 in (332 cm)

Volleyball information
- Position: Outside spiker
- Current club: (Czech Republic) VSC Zlín
- Number: 1

Career
- Years: Team
- 2016-2018 2018-: (Czech Republic) VK Kladno (Czech Republic) VSC Zlín

Adam Kozák (born 11 June 1999) is a Czech volleyball player, a member of the club VSC Zlín.

== Sporting achievements ==
=== Clubs ===
Czech Cup:

- 2017

Czech Championship:

- 2017, 2018
