= Lenka Krömrová =

Czech footballer

Personal information
- Date of birth: 13 July 1992 (age 34)
- Place of birth: Ostrava, Czechoslovakia
- Position: Goalkeeper

Team information
- Current team: Zlíchov 1914
- Number: 29

Senior career*
Years	Team	Apps	(Gls)
2009–	Slavia Prague	19	(0)
2011–2012	→ Dukla Praha (loan)		
2012–	→ Rakovník (loan)		
- Zlíchov 1914

International career^{‡}
2010	Czech Republic	2	(0)
- * Club domestic league appearances and goals as of 30 June 2010 ‡ National team caps and goals as of 26 September 2019

Lenka Krömrová is a Czech football goalkeeper, currently playing for FK Zlíchov 1914 in the third tier Czech Women's Football League.

Krömrová has played for the Czech national team. She made her debut for the national team on 28 November 2010 in a match against Hungary.
