= Michael Zacpálek =

Czech ice hockey player

- Born: February 21, 1991 (age 34); Kralupy nad Vltavou, Czechoslovakia
- Height: 5 ft 11 in (180 cm)
- Weight: 185 lb (84 kg; 13 st 3 lb)
- Position: Defence
- Shot: Left
- Czech Extraliga team: HC Sparta Praha
- Playing career: 2010–2014

Michael Zacpálek (born Kralupy nad Vltavou, February 21, 1991) is a Czech professional ice hockey player. He played with HC Sparta Praha in the Czech Extraliga during the 2010–11 Czech Extraliga season.
