= Martin Jenáček =

Czech ice hockey player

- Born: July 14, 1975 (age 50)
- Height: 5 ft 11 in (180 cm)
- Weight: 198 lb (90 kg; 14 st 2 lb)
- Position: Forward
- Shot: Right
- Czech Extraliga team: HC Litvínov
- Playing career: 1999–2013

Martin Jenáček (born July 14, 1975) is a Czech professional ice hockey player. He played with HC Litvínov in the Czech Extraliga during the 2010–11 Czech Extraliga season.
