= Miroslav Třetina =

Czech ice hockey player

Miroslav Tretina
- Born: January 27, 1980 (age 45)
- Height: 6 ft 0 in (183 cm)
- Weight: 179 lb (81 kg; 12 st 11 lb)
- Position: Forward
- Shoots: Left
- Czech Extraliga team: HC Slavia Praha
- Playing career: 2009–present

Miroslav Tretina (born January 27, 1980) is a Czech professional ice hockey player. He played with HC Slavia Praha in the Czech Extraliga during the 2010–11 Czech Extraliga season.
