= Jan Bojer =

Czech professional ice hockey player

- Born: June 25, 1989 (age 35)
- Height: 5 ft 10 in (178 cm)
- Weight: 168 lb (76 kg; 12 st 0 lb)
- Position: Forward
- Shoots: Left
- Czech Extraliga team: HC Litvínov
- Playing career: 2008–present

Jan Bojer (born June 25, 1989) is a Czech professional ice hockey player. He played with HC Litvínov in the Czech Extraliga during the 2010–11 Czech Extraliga season.
