= Martin Sigmund =

Czech footballer

Personal information
- Date of birth: 19 July 1982 (age 44)
- Place of birth: Czechoslovakia
- Height: 1.79 m (5 ft 10 in)
- Position: Midfielder

Senior career*
Years	Team	Apps	(Gls)
2002–2008	FK Teplice	6	(1)
2002	→ FC Chomutov (loan)		
2006–2007	→ FK Ústí nad Labem (loan)		
2008–2010	FK Baník Most		

International career
2003	Czech Republic U21	2	(0)
- * Club domestic league appearances and goals

Martin Sigmund (born 19 July 1982) is a retired Czech football player, who played in the Czech First League for FK Teplice. His previous club was Banik Modlany, with the previous competition as Landesliga.
