= Jiří Ptáček =

Czech footballer (born 1989)

Personal information
- Date of birth: 15 January 1989 (age 37)
- Place of birth: Czechoslovakia
- Position: Defender

Team information
- Current team: Loko Vltavín
- Number: 18

Senior career*
Years	Team	Apps	(Gls)
2009–2011	FK Čáslav	33	(5)
2011	FK MAS Táborsko	1	(1)
2012–	Bohemians 1905	17	(3)
2013	→ Slavia Louňovice (loan)		
2014–	→ Loko Vltavín (loan)	9	(0)
- * Club domestic league appearances and goals as of 9 May 2014

Jiří Ptáček (born 15 January 1989) is a Czech football player who currently plays for Loko Vltavín in the Czech 2. Liga.
