= Miloslav Kufa =

Czech former footballer (born 1971)

Personal information
- Date of birth: 16 March 1971 (age 55)
- Place of birth: Brno, Czechoslovakia
- Position: Defensive midfielder

Senior career*
Years	Team	Apps	(Gls)
1988–1994	Zbrojovka Brno	36	(2)
1989–1990	→ Dukla Prague (loan)	1	(0)
1994–1996	Slovácká Slavia Uherské Hradiště	43	(12)
1996–2000	Petra Drnovice	72	(7)
1999	→ Synot Staré Město (loan)	11	(2)
2000	Jokerit	27	(0)
2001	Chmel Blšany	4	(0)
2001	Vysočina Jihlava	15	(2)
- * Club domestic league appearances and goals

Miloslav Kufa (born 16 March 1971) is a Czech former professional football player who played as a defensive midfielder. Besides in his native Czech Republic, Kufa played in Finnish Veikkausliiga for Jokerit in 2000, also representing the club in the UEFA Cup qualification matches.
