= Vašek Klouda =

Czech freestyle footbag player (born 1986)

Václav "Vašek" Klouda (born 1986) is a Czech competitive freestyle footbag player. Raised and resident in Prague, in the Czech Republic, Klouda started playing footbag when he was 13. He won his first Footbag World Championship in 2002 in San Francisco, beating the two-time defending champion Ryan Mulroney in the most tightly contested finals ever. He completed a clean sweep by taking first place in the three major freestyle disciplines: 2 Minute Routines, Shred30, and Sick 3. Klouda has since successfully defended his title five times, in Prague in 2003, Montreal in 2004, in Helsinki in 2005, in Frankfurt in 2006, and in Orlando in 2007. He holds the record for most consecutive World Titles (6), as well as total World Titles (7).

In the 2008 IFPA Footbag World Championships, held in Prague, Klouda was beaten by Damian Gielnicki of Poland, ending his bid for a 7th straight world championship.

Bouncing back from 2008, Klouda reclaimed the world title in Berlin, Germany. At the tournament Klouda's first book was launched. The Vašek Klouda Manual: How to Play Footbag is an eBook downloadable from the Czech Footbag Association's homepage.

In Klouda's autobiography he mentions tennis, boxing and tae kwon do. He also talks about his time learning chess and says, "I also had a chance to play against the then world champion Kasparov".

== Freestyle Footbag Events ==
WORLD CHAMPIONSHIPS

- San Francisco, 2002

Winner: Singles Routine

- Prague, 2003

Winner: Singles Routine, Shred 30, and Doubles Routine

- Montreal, 2004

Winner: Singles Routine, Shred 30, and Doubles Routine

- Helsinki, 2005

Winner: Singles Routine, Shred 30, Big 3, and Doubles Routine

- Frankfurt, 2006

Winner: Singles Routine - 3rd Place: Shred 30

- Florida, 2007

Winner: Singles Routine, Shred 30, Circle Contest, and Doubles Freestyle

- Prague, 2008

Winner: Doubles Routine - 2nd Place: Singles Routine - 3rd Place: Request Contest

- Berlin, 2009

Winner: Singles Routine

- Oakland, 2010

5th Place: Singles Routine

- Helsinki, 2011

Runner Up: Request Contest - 5th Place: Singles Routine

- Warsaw, 2012

4th Place: Singles Routine

- Paris, 2014

Winner: Request Contest - 2nd Place: Shred 30 and Sick 3 - 3rd Place: Singles Routine - 5th Place: Circle Contest

- Copenhagen, 2015

Winner: Sick 3and Circle Contest - 2nd Place: Shred 30, Request Contest, and Sick Trick - 3rd Place: Singles Routine

- Trnava, 2016

2nd Place: Singles Routine

EUROPEAN CHAMPIONSHIPS

- Prague, 2001. 1st Place
- Budapest, 2002. European champion Footbag
- Frankfurt, 2003. Champion European Footbag
- Copenhagen, 2004. Champion European Footbag
- Warsaw, 2005. Champion European Footbag
- Lausanne, 2006. Champion European Footbag
- Vienna, 2007. Champion European Footbag
- Montpellier, 2008. Champion European Footbag
- Madrid, 2011. Champion European Footbag
- Moscow, 2013. Champion European Footbag
- Turku, 2014. Champion European Footbag
- Sofia, 2015. Champion European in circle, shred, sick3 and request
