= Martin Heřman =

Czech ice hockey player

- Born: 23 June 1987 (age 37)
- Height: 6 ft 1 in (185 cm)
- Weight: 181 lb (82 kg; 12 st 13 lb)
- Position: Forward
- Shoots: Left
- Czech Extraliga team: HC Plzeň
- Playing career: 2005–present

Martin Heřman (born 23 June 1987) is a Czech professional ice hockey forward who played with HC Plzeň in the Czech Extraliga during the 2010–11 season.
