= Robert Slávik =

Czech ice hockey goaltender

- Born: May 29, 1974 (age 51) Ostrov, Czechoslovakia
- Height: 6 ft 3 in (191 cm)
- Weight: 207 lb (94 kg; 14 st 11 lb)
- Position: Goaltender
- Caught: Left
- Played for: HC České Budějovice; HC Plzeň; HC Znojemští Orli
- Playing career: 1991–2008

Robert Slávik (born May 29, 1974) is a Czech former professional ice hockey goaltender.

Slávik played 65 games in the Czech Extraliga for HC České Budějovice, HC Plzeň and HC Znojemští Orli. He also played two seasons in the German Oberliga for Dresdner Eislöwen and three seasons in the Austrian National League for EV Zeltweg.

Slávik played in the 1994 World Junior Ice Hockey Championships for the Czech Republic.
