= Josef Just =

Czech footballer

Personal information
- Date of birth: 19 March 1973 (age 53)
- Place of birth: Czechoslovakia
- Position: Midfielder

Senior career*
Years	Team	Apps	(Gls)
1996–1997	FK Teplice	25	(1)
1997–1999	FK Jablonec	25	(0)

International career
1994	Czech Republic U21	1	(0)
- * Club domestic league appearances and goals

Josef Just (born 19 March 1973) is a retired Czech football player who played in the Czech First League for FK Teplice and FK Jablonec.
