= Martin Podešva =

Czech ice hockey player

- Born: December 16, 1988 (age 36); Vsetín, Czechoslovakia
- Height: 5 ft 8 in (173 cm)
- Weight: 150 lb (68 kg; 10 st 10 lb)
- Position: Centre
- Shoots: Left
- Tipsport Liga team Former teams: HC 07 Detva; HC Vsetín; HC Oceláři Třinec; Orli Znojmo; PSG Berani Zlín; MsHK Zilina
- Playing career: 2007–present

Martin Podešva (born December 16, 1988) is a Czech professional ice hockey player currently playing for HC 07 Detva in the Tipsport Liga.

== Career ==
Podešva began his career with HC Vsetín and made his debut for the senior team during the 2006–07 Czech Extraliga season where he played three games.

On April 19, 2013, Podešva joined Orli Znojmo of the Erste Bank Eishockey Liga He then moved to PSG Berani Zlín on May 2, 2016 but later rejoined Orli Znojmo on December 5, 2016, to aid their sickness crisis having had five senior players of sick leave.
