= Tomáš Gřeš =

Czech ice hockey player

- Born: 16 February 1996 (age 29) Ostrava, Czech Republic
- Height: 198 cm (6 ft 6 in)
- Weight: 90 kg (198 lb; 14 st 2 lb)
- Position: Forward
- Shoots: Left
- Czech2 team Former teams: HC RT Torax Poruba; HC Vítkovice Ridera; HC Olomouc
- Playing career: 2015–present

Tomáš Gřeš (born 16 February 1996) is a Czech ice hockey forward currently playing for HC RT Torax Poruba of the 1st Czech Republic Hockey League.
