= David Petrus =

Czech footballer

Personal information
- Date of birth: 1 August 1987 (age 39)
- Place of birth: Czechoslovakia
- Height: 1.73 m (5 ft 8 in)
- Position: Striker

Team information
- Current team: Baník Ostrava

Senior career*
Years	Team	Apps	(Gls)
2011–2013	FK Pardubice	30	(9)
2013–	Baník Ostrava	6	(1)
- * Club domestic league appearances and goals as of 6 February 2014

David Petrus (born 1 August 1987) is a Czech football player who plays for FC Baník Ostrava.
