= Jiří Stejskal =

Czech ice hockey player

- Born: November 9, 1982 (age 42)
- Height: 6 ft 1 in (185 cm)
- Weight: 207 lb (94 kg; 14 st 11 lb)
- Position: Goaltender
- Catches: Right
- Czech Extraliga team: HC Bílí Tygři Liberec
- Playing career: 2004–present

Jiří Stejskal (born November 9, 1982) is a Czech professional ice hockey goaltender. He played with HC Bílí Tygři Liberec in the Czech Extraliga during the 2009–10 Czech Extraliga season.
