= Filip Turek (ice hockey) =

Czech ice hockey player

- Born: May 24, 1972 (age 53) České Budějovice, Czechoslovakia
- Position: Forward
- Shot: Left
- Slovak Extraliga team Former teams: HKm Zvolen; HC Vítkovice; HC České Budějovice; Espoo Blues; AIK Hockey
- National team: Czech Republic
- Playing career: 1989–2010

Filip Turek (born May 24, 1972 in České Budějovice) is a Czech former professional ice hockey forward. He played 11 years in Ceske Budejovice and then he went to AIK Hockey in Sweden. After less than one year in Sweden he came back to the Czech Republic. He last played for HKm Zvolen in the Slovak Extraliga.
