= Ondřej Švaňhal =

Czech ice hockey player

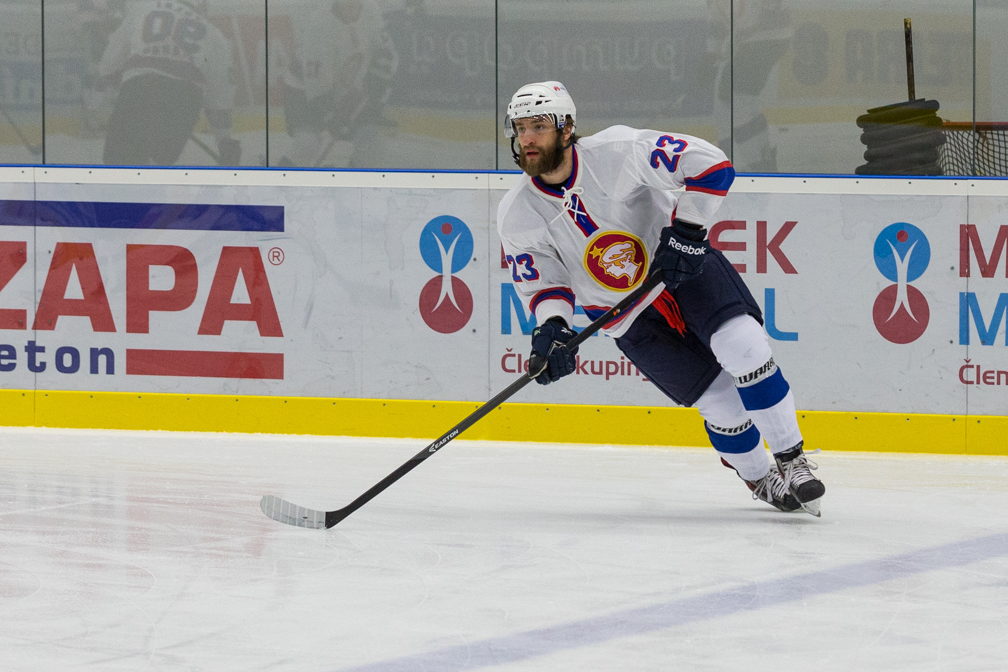
- Born: May 1, 1986 (age 38); Brno, Czechoslovakia
- Height: 6 ft 0 in (183 cm)
- Weight: 160 lb (73 kg; 11 st 6 lb)
- Position: Forward
- Shoots: Left
- Czech Extraliga team: HC Kometa Brno
- NHL draft: Undrafted
- Playing career: 2009–present

Ondřej Švaňhal (born February 12, 1989) is a Czech professional ice hockey player who currently plays with HC Kometa Brno in the Czech Extraliga.
