= Lukáš Landovský =

Czech footballer (born 1994)

Personal information
- Date of birth: 11 August 1994 (age 32)
- Place of birth: Czech Republic
- Position: Defender

Team information
- Current team: FK Baumit Jablonec

Senior career*
Years	Team	Apps	(Gls)
2013–	FK Baumit Jablonec	2	(0)
2014–2015	→ FK Varnsdorf (loan)	21	(2)

International career^{‡}
2013	Czech Republic U19	5	(0)
2013–2014	Czech Republic U20	7	(0)
- * Club domestic league appearances and goals as of 31 May 2015 ‡ National team caps and goals as of 31 May 2015

Lukáš Landovský (born 11 August 1994) is a professional Czech football player who currently plays for FK Baumit Jablonec.
