= Jiří Huška =

Czech footballer (born 1988)

Personal information
- Date of birth: 27 January 1988 (age 38)
- Place of birth: Brno, Czechoslovakia
- Height: 2.00 m (6 ft 6 1/2 in)
- Position: Defender

Team information
- Current team: FK Blansko
- Number: 5

Youth career
- 1993–1995: AC Lelekovice
- 1995–1997: FC Kuřim
- 1997–2009: FC Zbrojovka Brno

Senior career*
Years	Team	Apps	(Gls)
2009–	FC Zbrojovka Brno	14	(0)
2012	→ FC Sparta Brno (loan)	1	(0)
2012	→ SK Líšeň (loan)	1	(0)
2012–2013	→ 1. FC Karlovy Vary (loan)	11	(0)
2018–	FK Blansko	2	(0)
- * Club domestic league appearances and goals as of 31 August 2020

Jiří Huška (born 27 January 1988) is a Czech football player who currently plays for FK Blansko.
