= Pavel Korda =

Czech darts player and commentator

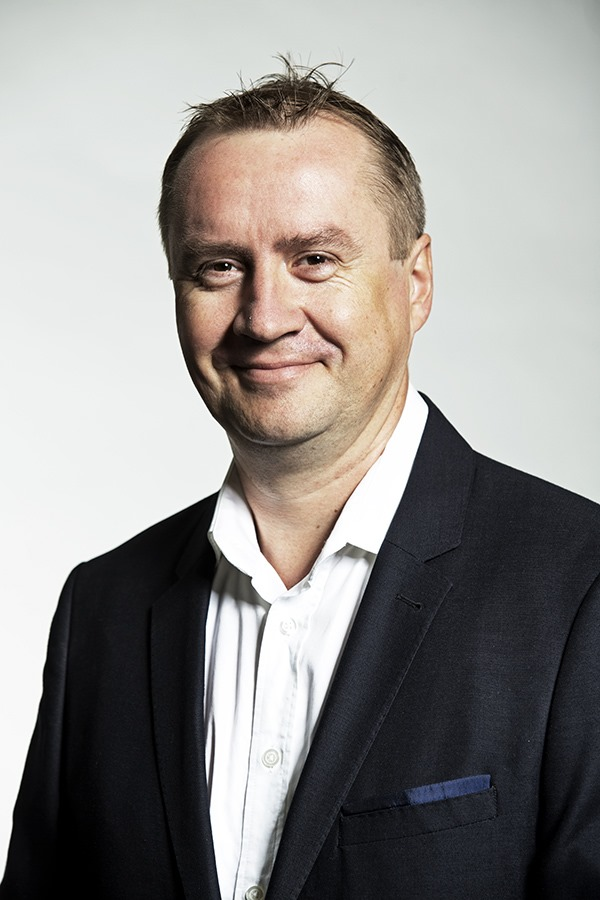
- Born: 17 May 1971 (age 54); Kutná Hora, Czech Republic
- Occupation(s): Sports commentator and promoter
- Known for: Presenting on: TV Nova (2015 – present); Organizing: Rebel Prague Darts Masters 2018; Rebel Prague Darts Masters Winter Classic 2018; Czech Darts Open 2019; Prague Darts Masters 2019; Tipsport Premier League 2020

Pavel Korda (born 17 May 1971) is a Czech former darts player and current sports commentator for TV Nova and active promoter of darts in Czech Republic.

== Career ==
During his darts career, Korda participated in many tournaments on national and European scene. His biggest success is the title of the National Champion in teams with DC Bizoni. For more than 10 years, he was vice-chairman of the Czech Darts Organization and contributed to the rise of an international tournament, Czech Open. As coach of the Czech Youth National Darts Team, Korda was at the first medals for Czech darts on international level, during WDF Europe Cup Youth 2008.

== Sports commentator and darts ==
Since 2015, Korda has been sports commentator for Czech TV Nova. He provides commentary for all major darts tournaments broadcast on Nova Sport channels. Korda also responsible for the national team of the Czech Republic competing in PDC World Cup of Darts, in which the Czech Republic regularly participates.

He is also known as an active promoter of darts, he managed to push through the first tournament of PDC European Tour to took place in Eastern Europe. The tournament was held in PVA Expo Prague from 28 to 30 June 2019 under the name Czech Darts Open 2019. There were 48 players in the tournament, including the biggest stars of darts, Michael van Gerwen, Peter Wright, Gerwyn Price, Adrian Lewis, James Wade and more. The first winner of the tournament was Jamie Hughes.

Korda has promoted numerous exhibition tournaments for darts. After organising an event in February 2018, he organised a second later that November in Královka Arena, Prague, which featured darts players, including Michael van Gerwen and Peter Wright. A third followed in November 2019, this time named Prague Darts Masters, also at Královka Arena. One of the participants included sixteen-time world champion, Phil Taylor.

During the COVID-19 pandemic, Korda came up with an idea to organise the first edition of Tipsport Premier League 2020. The tournament was broadcast on TV Nova Sport2 and was at that time one of the only live sport events in Czech Republic and one of the few in Europe. The league was inspired by PDC Premier League and ten Czech players took part in it. All players played from their home and the whole event had also a charitable purpose, for every 180 scored, a specific amount of money was donated to charity.
