= Lukáš Nechvátal =

Czech footballer

Personal information
- Date of birth: 10 March 1981 (age 45)
- Place of birth: Czechoslovakia
- Height: 1.84 m (6 ft 1/2 in)
- Position: Midfielder

Team information
- Current team: 1. FK Příbram
- Number: 14

Senior career*
Years	Team	Apps	(Gls)
2008–2009	1. FK Příbram	16	(0)
- * Club domestic league appearances and goals as of 31 December 2011

Lukáš Nechvátal (born 10 March 1981) is a professional Czech football player. He made 16 appearances in the Gambrinus liga for 1. FK Příbram.
