= Lukáš Vařecha =

Czech ice hockey player

- Born: March 1, 1990 (age 36)
- Height: 5 ft 9 in (175 cm)
- Weight: 150 lb (68 kg; 10 st 10 lb)
- Position: Forward
- Shoots: Left
- Czech Extraliga team: HC Bílí Tygři Liberec
- Playing career: 2010–present

Lukáš Vařecha (born March 1, 1990) is a Czech professional ice hockey player. He played with HC Bílí Tygři Liberec in the Czech Extraliga during the 2009–10 Czech Extraliga season.
