= Miroslav Škumát =

Czech ice hockey player

- Born: October 14, 1987 (age 38) Bílovec, Czechoslovakia
- Height: 5 ft 11 in (180 cm)
- Weight: 159 lb (72 kg; 11 st 5 lb)
- Position: Forward
- Shoots: Left
- Slovak Extraliga team Former teams: MHC Martin; HK Jestřábi Prostějov; AZ Havířov; MHK Dolný Kubín; HC Dukla Jihlava
- Playing career: 2006–present

Miroslav Škumát is a Czech professional ice hockey player in Slovakia with MHC Martin of the Slovak Extraliga.
