= Petr Filipský =

Czech footballer

Personal information
- Date of birth: 9 July 1985 (age 41)
- Place of birth: Czechoslovakia
- Height: 1.66 m (5 ft 5 in)
- Position: Midfielder

Team information
- Current team: KFC Komárno
- Number: 8

Senior career*
Years	Team	Apps	(Gls)
2004–2008	Slovácko	32	(3)
2005–2006	Drnovice	9	(0)
2009	Mutěnice (loan)		
2010–2012	HFK Olomouc		
2012	KFC Komárno		
2013–2014	Thermál Veľký Meder		
2014–2015, 2018-2019	Borsice		
2016	Pottschach		
2017	USV Sulz		
- * Club domestic league appearances and goals as of 21 March 2024

Petr Filipský (born 9 July 1985) is a Czech footballer, who played as a midfielder. He retired from football in 2019.
