= Lukáš Matyska =

Czech footballer

Personal information
- Date of birth: 26 April 1992 (age 34)
- Place of birth: Czechoslovakia
- Height: 1.76 m (5 ft 9 1/2 in)
- Position: Midfielder

Team information
- Current team: FC Zbrojovka Brno

Youth career
- –2010: FC Zbrojovka Brno

Senior career*
Years	Team	Apps	(Gls)
2010–	FC Zbrojovka Brno B	44	(6)
2011–2012	→ FC Sparta Brno (loan)	3	(2)
2010–	FC Zbrojovka Brno	4	(0)
- * Club domestic league appearances and goals as of 9 January 2013

Lukáš Matyska (born 26 April 1992) is a professional Czech football player currently playing for FC Zbrojovka Brno.
