= Lukáš Endál =

Czech ice hockey player

- Born: December 8, 1986 (age 38)
- Height: 6 ft 0 in (183 cm)
- Weight: 165 lb (75 kg; 11 st 11 lb)
- Position: Forward
- Shoots: Left
- PHL team Former teams: Ciarko PBS Bank KH Sanok; HC Pardubice (Czech Extraliga); Piráti Chomutov (1. národní hokejová liga); HC Havlíčkův Brod (1. národní hokejová liga); HC Slavia Praha (Czech Extraliga)
- NHL draft: Undrafted
- Playing career: 2006–present

Lukáš Endál (born December 8, 1986) is a Czech professional ice hockey forward who currently plays for Ciarko PBS Bank KH Sanok of the PHL in Poland. He formerly played for HC Pardubice and HC Slavia Praha of the Czech Extraliga, and Piráti Chomutov and HC Havlíčkův Brod of the 1. národní hokejová liga.
