= Martin Záhorovský =

Czech ice hockey player

- Born: February 9, 1981 (age 45) Havířov, Czechoslovakia
- Height: 6 ft 0 in (183 cm)
- Weight: 163 lb (74 kg; 11 st 9 lb)
- Position: Forward
- Shoots: Left
- Czech Extraliga team: HC Zlín
- Playing career: 2000–present

Martin Záhorovský (born February 9, 1981, in Havířov) is a Czech professional ice hockey player. He played with HC Zlín in the Czech Extraliga during the 2010–11 Czech Extraliga season.
