= Ladislav Gengel =

Czech ice hockey player

- Born: June 25, 1981 (age 44)
- Height: 6 ft 1 in (185 cm)
- Weight: 176 lb (80 kg; 12 st 8 lb)
- Position: Left wing
- Shoots: Left
- Czech 2. Liga team Former teams: HC Příbram; Vsetínská hokejová BK Mladá Boleslav; Rytíři Kladno
- Playing career: 2004–present

Ladislav Gengel (born June 25, 1981) is a Czech professional ice hockey left winger for HC Příbram of the Czech 2. Liga.

Gengel played with 35 games in the Czech Extraliga for Vsetínská hokejová, BK Mladá Boleslav and Rytíři Kladno.
