= Dominik Hrníčko =

Czech ice hockey player

- Born: October 29, 1995 (age 30) Liberec, Czech Republic
- Height: 6 ft 0 in (183 cm)
- Weight: 183 lb (83 kg; 13 st 1 lb)
- Position: Forward
- Shoots: Right
- Czech team Former teams: HC Dynamo Pardubice; HC Bílí Tygři Liberec
- Playing career: 2014–present

Dominik Hrníčko (born October 29, 1995) is a Czech professional ice hockey player. He is currently playing for HC Dynamo Pardubice of the Czech Extraliga.

Hrníčko made his Czech Extraliga debut playing with HC Bílí Tygři Liberec during the 2014-15 Czech Extraliga season.
