= Daniel Skalický =

Czech ice hockey player

- Born: February 5, 1991 (age 34); Liberec, Czechoslovakia
- Height: 6 ft 0 in (183 cm)
- Weight: 187 lb (85 kg; 13 st 5 lb)
- Position: Forward
- Shoots: Right
- Czech team: HC Bílí Tygři Liberec
- Playing career: 2009–present

Daniel Skalický (born February 5, 1991) is a Czech professional ice hockey player. He is currently playing for HC Bílí Tygři Liberec of the Czech Extraliga.

Skalický made his Czech Extraliga debut playing with HC Bílí Tygři Liberec during the 2009-10 Czech Extraliga season.
