= Lukáš Finsterle =

Czech ice hockey player

- Born: March 9, 1990 (age 36) Gottwaldov, Czechoslovakia
- Height: 5 ft 11 in (180 cm)
- Weight: 159 lb (72 kg; 11 st 5 lb)
- Position: Forward
- Shoots: Left
- Czech 2. Liga team Former teams: HC Bobři Valašské Meziříčí; HC Zlín; Orli Znojmo; MHC Martin
- Playing career: 2009–present

Lukáš Finsterle (born March 9, 1990) is a Czech professional ice hockey player for HC Bobři Valašské Meziříčí of the 2nd Czech Republic Hockey League.

Finsterle played 48 games with HC Zlín in the Czech Extraliga from 2009 to 2012. He also played in the Erste Bank Eishockey Liga for Orli Znojmo and the Tipsport Liga.
