= Ondřej Procházka =

Czech ice hockey player

- Procházka in 2026
- Born: August 31, 1997 (age 29) Roudnice, Czech Republic
- Height: 6 ft 2 in (188 cm)
- Weight: 165 lb (75 kg; 11 st 11 lb)
- Position: Left wing
- Shoots: Left
- Czech 1. Liga team Former teams: HC Slovan Ústí nad Labem; HC Sparta Praha
- Playing career: 2015–present

Ondřej Procházka (born August 31, 1997) is a Czech professional ice hockey player. He is currently playing for HC Slovan Ústí nad Labem of the Czech 1. Liga.

Procházka made his Czech Extraliga debut playing with HC Sparta Praha during the 2013-14 Czech Extraliga season.
