= Lukáš Žalčík =

Czech ice hockey player

- Born: October 15, 1990 (age 34); Šumperk, Czechoslovakia
- Height: 6 ft 0 in (183 cm)
- Weight: 187 lb (85 kg; 13 st 5 lb)
- Position: Forward
- Shoots: Right
- Czech Extraliga team: HC Sparta Praha
- Playing career: 2010–present

Lukáš Žalčík (born October 15, 1990) is a Czech professional ice hockey player. He played with HC Sparta Praha in the Czech Extraliga during the 2010–11 Czech Extraliga season.
