= Martin Chorý =

Czech footballer

Personal information
- Date of birth: 28 August 1970 (age 56)
- Place of birth: Czech Republic
- Position: Forward

Senior career*
Years	Team	Apps	(Gls)
?–1993	VTJ Kroměříž		
1993–1996	Hanácká Slavia Kroměříž		
1996–1997	Přerov		
1997–1999	Atlantic Lázně Bohdaneč	23	(1)
1999–2003	Hanácká Slavia Kroměříž		
- * Club domestic league appearances and goals

Martin Chorý (born 28 August 1970) is a Czech former footballer who played as a forward. His son, Tomáš, is also a footballer.
