= Martin Kolanda =

Czech sprint and marathon canoeist (born 1977)

Medal record

Men's canoe marathon

Representing Czech Republic

Canoe Marathon World Championships
Silver medal – second place	2001 Stockton-on-Tees	K-2 marathon

Martin Kolanda (born 14 December 1977 in Prague) is a Czech sprint and marathon canoeist who competed in canoe sprint and marathon on international level in years 1995–2007. Competing at several World Marathon Championships he won one silver medal on K2 in Stockton-on-Tees 2001.

== Career history ==
Kolanda began kayaking in the childhood and entered international kayak scene as a member of the junior Czech sprint team. In 1996 he became a member of the senior sprint team and raced at various sprint ICF events.

In 2001 Kolanda focused on marathon paddling and at his first World Marathon Championships in Stockton-on-Tees he won a silver medal on K2 with Branislav Šrámek.

In 2002 his season was influenced by heavy floods in the Czech Republic. He failed to repeat the success from previous year finishing 19th on K2 with the same partner at the World Marathon Championships in Zamora.

In the following four years Kolanda raced on K2 with Tomáš Ježek at ICF marathon events, but never reached a medal position at World Marathon Championships.

Kolanda retired in 2007 and became involved in supporting Czech canoe marathon team at ICF events.
