= Vladislav Kubeš =

Czech ice hockey player

- Born: October 31, 1978 (age 46); Klatovy, Czechoslovakia
- Height: 5 ft 9 in (175 cm)
- Weight: 183 lb (83 kg; 13 st 1 lb)
- Position: Forward
- Shoots: Left
- Czech Extraliga team: BK Mladá Boleslav
- Playing career: 1996–present

Vladislav Kubeš (born October 31, 1978) is a Czech professional ice hockey player. He played with BK Mladá Boleslav in the Czech Extraliga during the 2010–11 Czech Extraliga season.
