= Vít Štětina =

Czech footballer

Personal information
- Date of birth: 29 September 1989 (age 37)
- Place of birth: Czechoslovakia
- Height: 1.78 m (5 ft 10 in)
- Position: Midfielder

Team information
- Current team: SK Sulko Zábřeh
- Number: 14

Youth career
- Sigma Olomouc

Senior career*
Years	Team	Apps	(Gls)
2008–2010	Sigma Olomouc	5	(0)
2010–	SK Sulko Zábřeh	2	(0)
2010	→ Zenit Čáslav (loan)	5	(0)
- * Club domestic league appearances and goals as of 17 May 2010

Vít Štětina (born 29 September 1989) is a Czech football player who plays for Czech second division side SK Sulko Zábřeh.

== Career ==
Štětina joined SK Sigma Olomouc's reserve side in 2008, and would make five Gambrinus liga appearances for the first team before leaving the club in 2010.
