= Jiří Matějíček =

Czech ice hockey player

- Born: January 7, 1982 (age 44) Hradec Králové, Czechoslovakia
- Height: 6 ft 1 in (185 cm)
- Weight: 201 lb (91 kg; 14 st 5 lb)
- Position: Defence
- Shoots: Right
- Czech Extraliga team: HC Sparta Praha
- Playing career: 2001–present

Jiří Matějíček (born January 7, 1982) is a Czech professional ice hockey player. He made his Czech Extraliga debut with HC Sparta Praha during the 2010–11 Czech Extraliga postseason.
