= Michal Ondráček =

Czech footballer (born 1973)

Personal information
- Date of birth: 8 June 1973 (age 53)
- Place of birth: Czechoslovakia
- Position: Defender

Senior career*
Years	Team	Apps	(Gls)
1993–1996	FC Baník Ostrava	52	(0)
1997–1998	SK České Budějovice	4	(1)

International career
1994	Czech Republic U21	2	(0)
- * Club domestic league appearances and goals

Michal Ondráček (born 8 June 1973) is a retired Czech football player who played in the Czech First League for FC Baník Ostrava and SK České Budějovice. He later played for clubs including MFK Karviná and FC Hlučín.
