= Radim Vlasák =

Czech footballer

Personal information
- Date of birth: 5 January 1974 (age 52)
- Place of birth: Czechoslovakia
- Height: 1.91 m (6 ft 3 in)
- Position: Goalkeeper

Senior career*
Years	Team	Apps	(Gls)
1993–2002	FC Boby Brno	35	(0)
2002–2004	FK Teplice	4	(0)

International career
1994–1995	Czech Republic U21	2	(0)
- * Club domestic league appearances and goals

Radim Vlasák (born 5 January 1974) is a retired Czech football player who played in the Czech First League for FC Boby Brno and FK Teplice.
