= Václav Winter =

Czech footballer

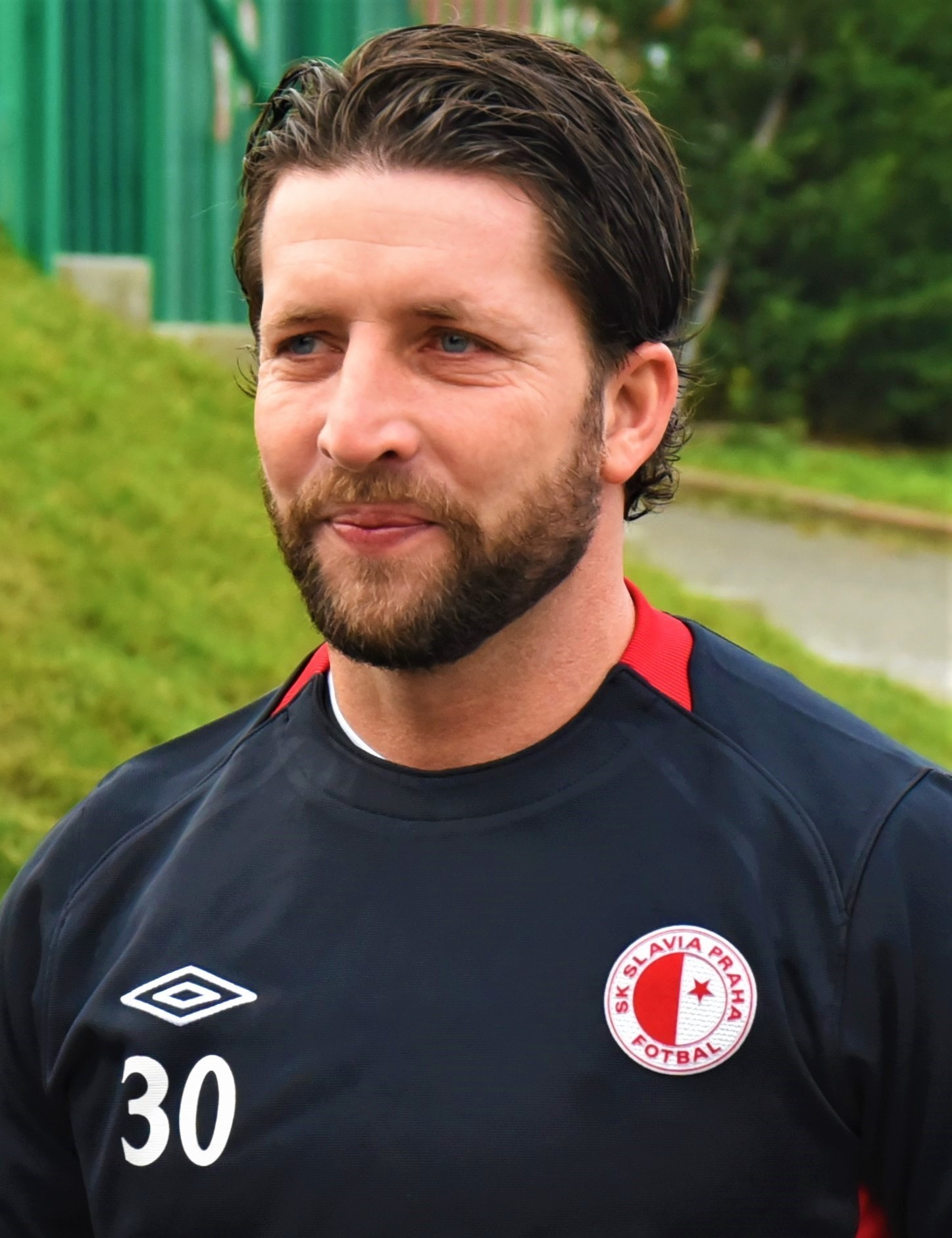
- Václav Winter (2019)

Personal information
- Date of birth: 18 August 1976 (age 50)
- Place of birth: Prague, Czechoslovakia
- Height: 1.82 m (6 ft 0 in)
- Position: Goalkeeper

Team information
- Current team: Bohemians Prague
- Number: 30

Youth career
- Slavia Prague

Senior career*
Years	Team	Apps	(Gls)
1995–1996	Slavia Prague	5	(0)
1997–2000	Lázně Bohdaneč	51	(0)
2000–2003	Neratovice	79	(0)
2003–2006	Kladno	43	(0)
2007–	Bohemians Prague	30	(0)
2009–2010	→ Vysočina Jihlava (loan)	16	(0)
- * Club domestic league appearances and goals as of 30 June 2010

Václav Winter (born 18 August 1976) is a Czech football player, who currently plays for Bohemians Prague as a goalkeeper.
