= Václav Pavlis =

Czech footballer

Personal information
- Date of birth: 7 March 1930
- Place of birth: Prague, Czechoslovakia
- Date of death: 24 December 2007 (aged 77)
- Place of death: Czech Republic
- Position: Goalkeeper

Senior career*
Years	Team	Apps	(Gls)
1947–1951	Bohemians Prague		
1951–1964	Dukla Prague		

International career
1949–1952	Czechoslovakia	2	(0)
- * Club domestic league appearances and goals

Václav Pavlis (7 March 1930 – 24 December 2007) was a football goalkeeper from Czechoslovakia. He was a member of the national team.

Pavlis started his football career at Bohemians Prague. In 1951 he began his military service at Dukla Prague and stayed there even after end of his compulsory service, until the end of his career. He won the Czechoslovak First League with Dukla seven times, in 1953, 1956, 1958, 1961, 1962, 1963 and 1964.

After finishing his active career he coached goalkeepers at Dukla Prague.
