= Pavel Elšík =

Czech footballer

Personal information
- Date of birth: 23 October 1985 (age 41)
- Place of birth: Czechoslovakia
- Height: 1.87 m (6 ft 2 in)
- Position: Midfielder

Team information
- Current team: FC Tescoma Zlín
- Number: 12

Senior career*
Years	Team	Apps	(Gls)
2007–	Zlín	72	(2)
- * Club domestic league appearances and goals as of 19 November 2011

Pavel Elšík (born 23 October 1985) is a Czech football player who currently plays for FC Tescoma Zlín. He made his Gambrinus liga debut for Zlín on 28 May 2007 in a 1–1 draw at home to Olomouc.
