= Petr Kostelník =

Czech former footballer

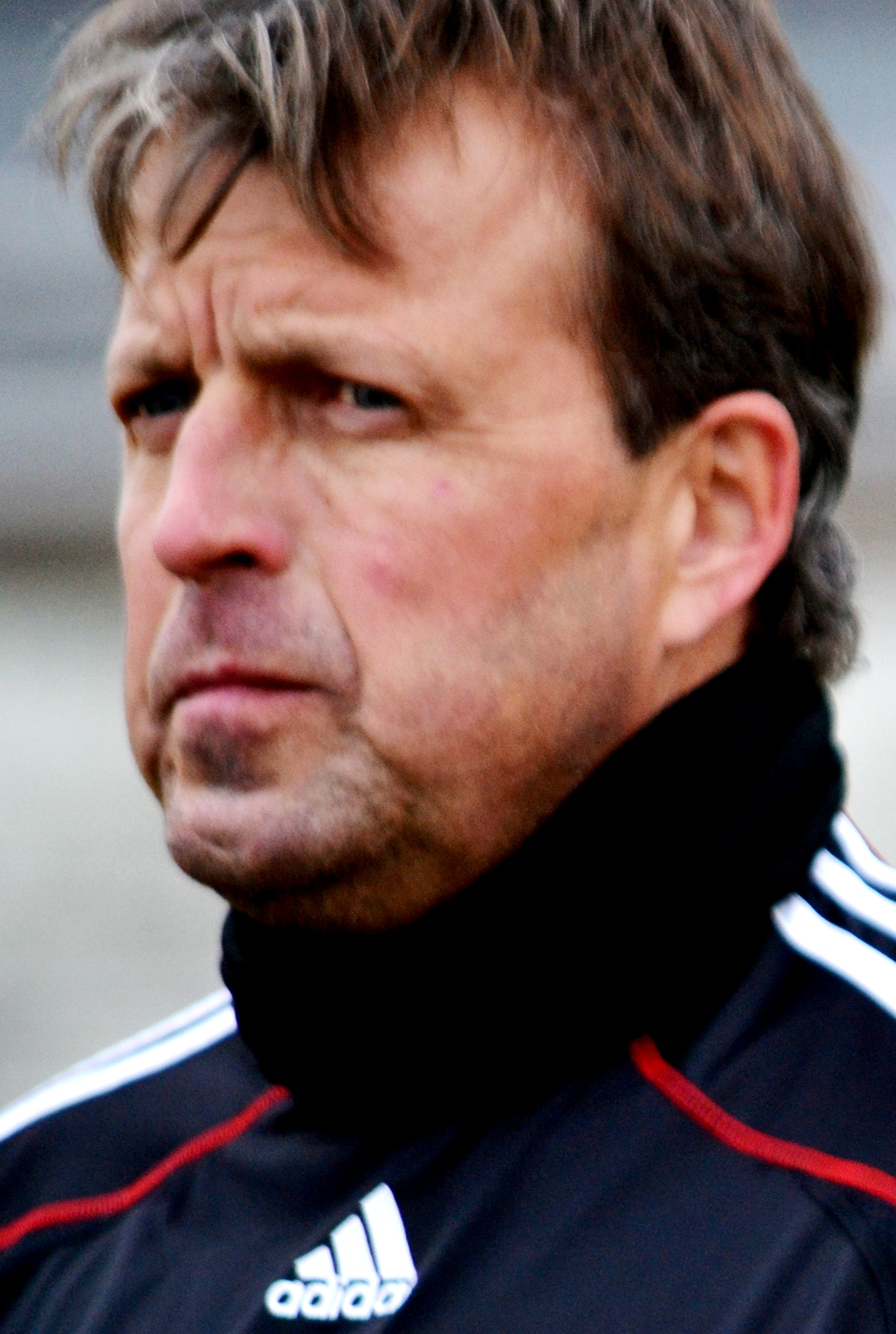
- Kostelník in 2013

Personal information
- Date of birth: 5 February 1964 (age 62)
- Place of birth: Brno, Czechoslovakia
- Position: Goalkeeper

Senior career*
Years	Team	Apps	(Gls)
1984–1992	Dukla Prague	160	(0)
1994–1996	AC Sparta Prague	8	(0)
1996–1997	FK Viktoria Žižkov	10	(0)
1997–1998	AFK Atlantic Lázně Bohdaneč	7	(0)

International career
1984–1986	Czechoslovakia U21	12	(0)
1986–1988	Czechoslovakia	3	(0)
- * Club domestic league appearances and goals

Petr Kostelník (born 5 February 1964) is a former football goalkeeper who represented the Czechoslovakia national football team, making three appearances. He played club football in Prague for Sparta and Dukla. He also played for Lázně Bohdaneč. In the Czech First League, Kostelník played for Sparta, Bohdaneč, and Žižkov. In the 1980s he made 12 appearances for Czechoslovakia U21, playing club football for Dukla Prague in the Czechoslovak First League between 1984 and 1992.

Kostelník suffered a non-fatal heart attack in 2006 at the age of 42 while working as assistant coach at Bohemians 1905. He spends his free time watching beach football.
