= Jiří Studík =

Czech footballer

Personal information
- Date of birth: 12 September 1985 (age 41)
- Place of birth: Czechoslovakia
- Height: 1.86 m (6 ft 1 in)
- Position: Defender

Senior career*
Years	Team	Apps	(Gls)
2005–2008	Slavia Prague	9	(0)
2006	→ 1. FC Slovácko (loan)	2	(0)
2007	→ Bohemians Prague (loan)		
2008	→ FK Baník Most (loan)	5	(1)
2009–2010	FK Baník Sokolov	25	(1)
2011	Bohemians Prague		

International career^{‡}
2006	Czech Republic U21	3	(0)
- * Club domestic league appearances and goals as of 20 December 2013 ‡ National team caps and goals as of 20 December 2013

Jiří Studík (born 12 September 1986) is a Czech footballer who plays as a defender. He scored his first top-flight league goal in February 2008.
