= Jan Hucl =

Czech ice hockey player

- Born: August 18, 1990 (age 34)
- Height: 6 ft 4 in (193 cm)
- Weight: 225 lb (102 kg; 16 st 1 lb)
- Position: Defence
- Shoots: Left
- Czech Extraliga team: HC Plzeň
- Playing career: 2010–present

Jan Hucl (born August 18, 1990) is a Czech professional ice hockey defenceman. He played with HC Plzeň in the Czech Extraliga during the 2010–11 Czech Extraliga season.
