= Petr Kica =

Czech ice hockey player

- Born: March 10, 1986 (age 39); Czechoslovakia
- Height: 5 ft 10 in (178 cm)
- Weight: 185 lb (84 kg; 13 st 3 lb)
- Position: Forward
- Shoots: Left
- Czech team Former teams: HC Bílí Tygři Liberec; HC Plzen
- NHL draft: Undrafted
- Playing career: 2004–present

Petr Kica (born March 10, 1986) is a Czech professional ice hockey player. He is currently playing with HC Bílí Tygři Liberec of the Czech Extraliga.

Kica made his Czech Extraliga debut playing with HC Plzen during the 2005–06 Czech Extraliga season.
