= Jan Plodek =

Czech ice hockey player

- Born: November 26, 1978 (age 47) Liberec, CS
- Height: 5 ft 9 in (175 cm)
- Weight: 165 lb (75 kg; 11 st 11 lb)
- Position: Forward
- Shot: Right
- Played for: HC Bílí Tygři Liberec; BK Mladá Boleslav
- Playing career: 1997–2017

Jan Plodek (born November 26, 1978) is a Czech former professional ice hockey player. He played in the Czech Extraliga for HC Bílí Tygři Liberec.
