= Tomas Csabi =

Czech ice hockey player

- Born: November 16, 1984 (age 40); Czech Republic
- Height: 6 ft 3 in (191 cm)
- Weight: 181 lb (82 kg; 12 st 13 lb)
- Position: Forward
- Shot: Right
- Played for: HC Slavia Praha (Czech)
- NHL draft: Undrafted
- Playing career: 2002–2007

Tomas Csabi (born November 16, 1984) is a Czech retired professional ice hockey player. During the 2002–03 Czech Extraliga season Csabi played one game in the Czech Extraliga with HC Slavia Praha.

Csabi won a bronze medal with the Czech Republic men's national under-18 ice hockey team at the 2002 IIHF World U18 Championships. He skated 19 games in the Ontario Hockey League during the 2002–03 OHL season with the Saginaw Spirit before returning to the Czech Republic.
