= Kateřina Dudková =

Czech triathlete

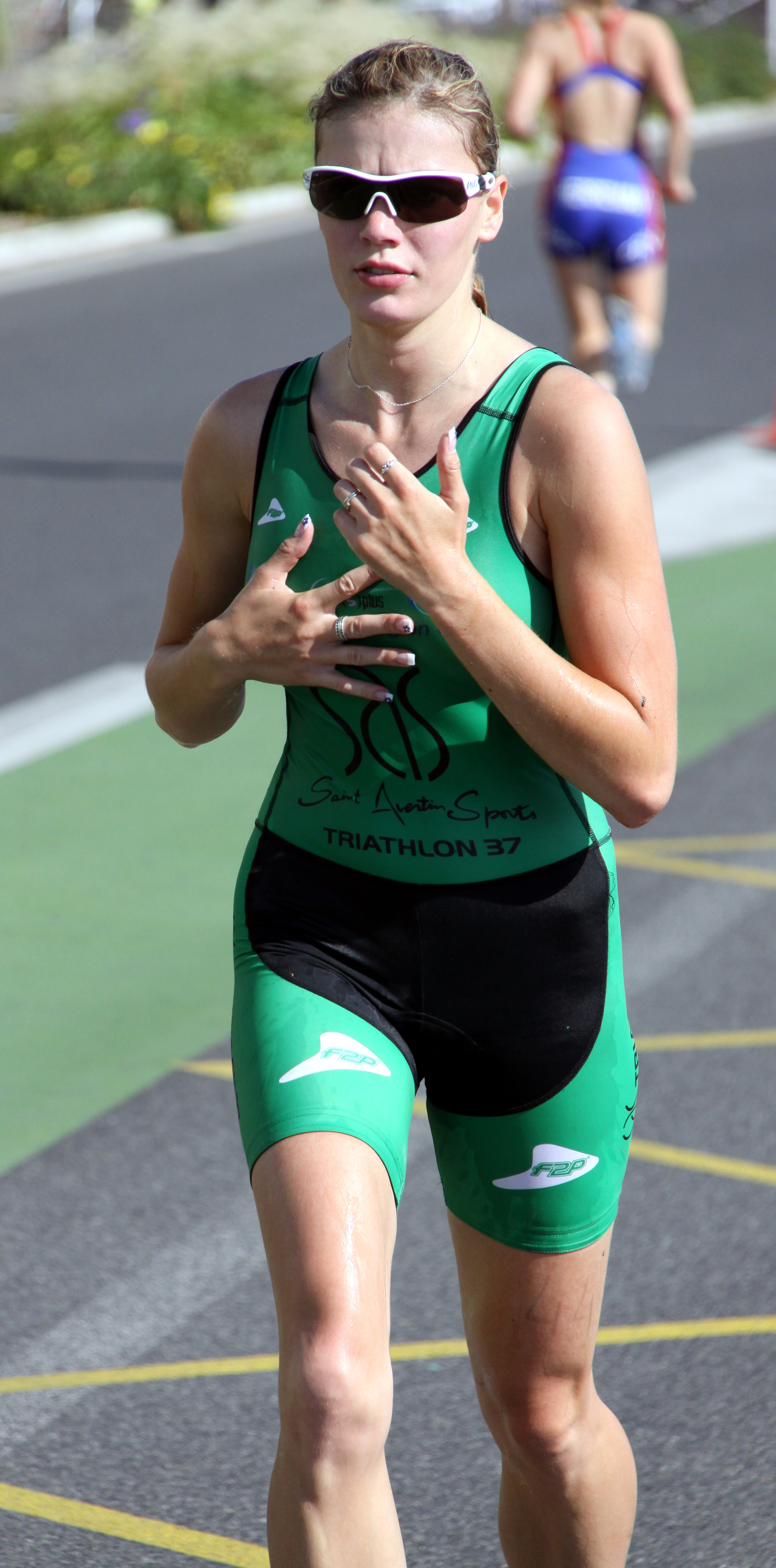
Katerina Dudkova at the Grand Final of the French D1 Club Championship Series Lyonnaise des Eaux, 2009.

Kateřina Dudková (born 1988) is a professional Czech triathlete, Czech U23 vice champion of the year 2009 and member of the young Czech elite team.

In 2007 Dudková started to take part in ITU and ETU competitions and placed fourth in two Junior European Cups, in the same year, at the age of 19, she also took part in an elite race and placed 33rd at the Premium European Cup in Poland.

In France Dudková represents the elite club SAS (= Saint-Avertin Sports) Triathlon 37. In 2009 and in 2010 she took part in the prestigious French Club Championship Series Lyonnaise des Eaux. At the opening triathlon in Dunkirk (23 May 2010) she placed 39th, at the Triathlon de Paris (18 July 2010) 28th, at Tourangeaux (29 August 2010) 30th, thus being always the second best of her club. At the Grand Final in La Baule (Triathlon Audencia, 18 September 2010), Dudková did not finish the race.

Dudková lives in Holice and represents the club Nový věk Triatlonu Trusnov.

== ITU Competitions ==
In the four years from 2007 to 2010, Dudková took part in 10 ITU competitions and achieved two top ten positions.

The following list is based upon the official ITU rankings and the Athlete's Profile Page. Unless indicated otherwise the following events are triathlons (Olympic Distance) and belong to the Elite category.

Date	Competition	Place	Rank
2007-06-16	European Cup (Junior)	Vienna	4
2007-06-29	European Championships (Junior)	Copenhagen	34
2007-07-15	European Cup (Junior)	Oudenaarde	4
2007-08-30	BG World Championships (Junior)	Hamburg	48
2007-09-09	Premium European Cup	Kedzierzyn Kozle	33
2009-06-20	European Championships (U23)	Tarzo Revine	DNF
2009-08-23	European Cup	Karlovy Vary (Carlsbad)	22
2010-06-27	Premium European Cup	Brasschaat	35
2010-08-22	European Cup	Karlovy Vary (Carlsbad)	18
2010-09-08	Dextro Energy World Championship Series, Grand Final: U23 World Championship	Budapest	40

BG = the sponsor British Gas · DNF = did not finish · DNS = did not start
