= Radim Ditrich =

Czech footballer (born 1985)

Personal information
- Date of birth: 13 February 1985 (age 41)
- Place of birth: Czechoslovakia
- Height: 1.85 m (6 ft 1 in)
- Position: Defender

Senior career*
Years	Team	Apps	(Gls)
2004–2008	Zlín	8	(0)
2006	→ Kroměříž (loan)		
2007	→ Jihlava (loan)		
2007	→ Vítkovice (loan)		

International career
2006	Czech Republic U21	1	(0)
- * Club domestic league appearances and goals

Radim Ditrich (born 13 February 1985) is a retired Czech football player who played in the Czech First League for Zlín.
