= Michal Houžvička =

Czech footballer

Personal information
- Date of birth: 8 August 1987 (age 39)
- Place of birth: Czechoslovakia
- Height: 1.85 m (6 ft 1 in)
- Position: Midfielder

Team information
- Current team: FK Viktoria Žižkov
- Number: 8

Senior career*
Years	Team	Apps	(Gls)
2008–	FK Viktoria Žižkov	22	(1)
- * Club domestic league appearances and goals as of 30 June 2011

Michal Houžvička (born 8 August 1987) is a professional Czech football player who currently plays for FK Viktoria Žižkov.
