= Jan Martykán =

Czech footballer

Personal information
- Date of birth: 17 March 1983 (age 43)
- Place of birth: Czechoslovakia
- Height: 1.78 m (5 ft 10 in)
- Position: Midfielder

Team information
- Current team: Ústí nad Labem
- Number: 2

Senior career*
Years	Team	Apps	(Gls)
2005–	Ústí nad Labem	112	(15)
2012	→ Slovácko (loan)	4	(0)
- * Club domestic league appearances and goals as of 31 December 2012

Jan Martykán (born 17 March 1983) is a Czech football player who currently plays for Srbice.
