= Aleš Ryška =

Czech footballer (born 1972)

Personal information
- Date of birth: 16 February 1972 (age 54)
- Position: Defender

Senior career*
| Years | Team | Apps | (Gls) |
| 1996–1999 | Sigma Olomouc | | |
| 1999 | Karviná | | |
| 1999–2000 | Svit Zlín | | |
| 2000–2001 | Vysočina Jihlava | | |
| 2001 | Prostějov | | |
| 2002 | Hradec Králové | | |
| 2002–2003 | Vysočina Jihlava | | |
| 2003–2005 | Hanácká Slavia Kroměříž | | |
- * Club domestic league appearances and goals

Aleš Ryška (born 16 February 1972) is a retired Czech football defender.
