= Pavel Harazim =

Czech footballer (born 1969)

Personal information
- Date of birth: 30 June 1969 (age 56)
- Place of birth: Czechoslovakia
- Height: 1.78 m (5 ft 10 in)
- Position: Defender

Senior career*
| Years | Team | Apps | (Gls) |
| – | FC Vítkovice | | |
| – | RH Cheb | | |
| – | FK Drnovice | | |
| – | FC Baník Ostrava | | |
| 1998–2004 | SFC Opava | | |
- * Club domestic league appearances and goals

Pavel Harazim (born 30 June 1969) is a retired Czech football defender. He made over 250 top-flight appearances spanning the existence of the Czechoslovak First League and the Gambrinus liga. He was one of a large number of players to leave SFC Opava in May 2004.
