= Kristián Kolář =

Czech ice hockey goaltender

- Born: June 30, 2000 (age 24); Písek, Czech Republic
- Height: 6 ft 0 in (183 cm)
- Weight: 181 lb (82 kg; 12 st 13 lb)
- Position: Goaltender
- Catches: Left
- Czech team: HC Plzeň
- Playing career: 2018–present

Kristián Kolář (born June 30, 2000) is a Czech professional ice hockey goaltender for HC Plzeň of the Czech Extraliga.

Kolář began his career with IHC Písek at U16 level before joining HC Plzeň in 2016. He made his Extraliga debut with Plzeň during the 2019–20 season where he played two games.
