= Petr Tomašák =

Czech footballer

Personal information
- Date of birth: 20 February 1986 (age 40)
- Place of birth: Ostrava, Czechoslovakia
- Height: 1.81 m (5 ft 11 1/2 in)
- Position: Midfielder

Team information
- Current team: FC Hradec Králové

Youth career
- 1992–1995: Důl 9. květen Albrechtice
- 1995–1997: Baník Havířov
- 1997–2004: FC Baník Ostrava

Senior career*
Years	Team	Apps	(Gls)
2004–2009	FC Baník Ostrava	51	(6)
2008	1. FK Příbram → (loan)	9	(1)
2010–2012	FC Hradec Králové → (loan)	17	(1)
2012–	Dolní Datyně	10	(3)

International career
2003–2005	Czech Republic U-19	12	(1)
2006	Czech Republic U-21	2	(0)
- * Club domestic league appearances and goals as of 7 June 2011

Petr Tomašák (born 20 February 1986 in Ostrava) is a Czech footballer.

Tomašák played mostly for FC Baník Ostrava and won the Czech Cup with the team in 2005. Since 2012 he plays for Dolni Datyne 1.B class, now (2013) 1.A class.
