= Antonín Spěvák =

Czech footballer (born 1971)

Personal information
- Date of birth: 14 February 1971 (age 55)
- Place of birth: Czech Republic
- Position: Defender

Senior career*
Years	Team	Apps	(Gls)
1990–1992	Union Cheb	20	(0)
1995–1996	FK GGS Arma Ústí nad Labem		
1996–1999	AFK Atlantic Lázně Bohdaneč		
2001–2002	FK Kolín		
- * Club domestic league appearances and goals

Antonín Spěvák (born 14 February 1971) is a retired Czech defender.
