= Tomáš Ficenc =

Czech ice hockey player

- Born: December 28, 1977 (age 48) Jihlava, Czechoslovakia
- Height: 6 ft 2 in (188 cm)
- Weight: 187 lb (85 kg; 13 st 5 lb)
- Position: Defence
- Shot: Left
- Played for: HC Vítkovice; BK Havlíčkův Brod; HC Dukla Jihlava; MsHK Zilina; HC Slovan Ústečtí Lvi
- Playing career: 1997–2013

Tomáš Ficenc (born December 28, 1977) is a Czech professional ice hockey defenceman. He played with HC Vítkovice in the Czech Extraliga during the 2010–11 Czech Extraliga season.

== Career statistics ==
			Regular season					Playoffs
Season	Team	League	GP	G	A	Pts	PIM	GP	G	A	Pts	PIM
1997–98	BK Havlíčkův Brod	Czech2	47	2	8	10	—	—	—	—	—	—
1998–99	HC Dukla Jihlava	Czech	—	—	—	—	—	—	—	—	—	—
1999–00	HC Dukla Jihlava	Czech2	34	1	5	6	32	10	0	1	1	6
2000–01	HC Dukla Jihlava	Czech2	26	3	2	5	14	7	1	0	1	6
2001–02	HC Dukla Jihlava	Czech2	37	3	9	12	26	13	0	2	2	24
2002–03	HC Vitkovice	Czech	3	1	0	1	2	2	0	0	0	2
2002–03	HC Dukla Jihlava	Czech2	40	7	16	23	40	12	0	6	6	14
2003–04	HC Vitkovice	Czech	47	3	8	11	48	4	0	0	0	0
2004–05	HC Dukla Jihlava	Czech	52	1	6	7	58	—	—	—	—	—
2005–06	MsHK Zilina	Slovak	54	3	8	11	52	16	0	1	1	29
2006–07	HC Slovan Ústečtí Lvi	Czech2	40	2	4	6	20	12	1	5	6	4
2007–08	HC Slovan Ústečtí Lvi	Czech	26	0	0	0	18	—	—	—	—	—
2007–08	HC Dukla Jihlava	Czech2	20	2	7	9	20	5	0	2	2	10
2008–09	HC Dukla Jihlava	Czech2	45	3	10	13	36	8	0	1	1	10
2009–10	HC Dukla Jihlava	Czech2	46	4	8	12	34	10	2	3	5	6
2010–11	HC Dukla Jihlava	Czech2	44	2	13	15	52	10	0	1	1	6
2010–11	HC Vitkovice	Czech	2	0	0	0	0	10	0	0	0	2
2011–12	HC Dukla Jihlava	Czech2	47	6	13	19	20	12	1	3	4	8
2012–13	HC Dukla Jihlava	Czech2	49	2	8	10	30	4	0	0	0	2
Czech totals			130	5	14	19	126	16	0	0	0	4
Czech2 totals			475	37	103	140	324	103	5	24	29	96
