= Martin Rejthar =

Czech ice hockey defenceman

- Born: October 13, 1971 (age 54)
- Height: 5 ft 8 in (173 cm)
- Weight: 209 lb (95 kg; 14 st 13 lb)
- Position: Defence
- Shot: Left
- Played for: HC Plzeň; HC Karlovy Vary; AaB Ishockey
- Playing career: 1991–2010

Martin Rejthar (born October 13, 1971) is a Czech former professional ice hockey defenceman.

Rejthar played 50 games in the Czech Extraliga for HC Plzeň and HC Karlovy Vary. He also played six seasons for AaB Ishockey in Denmark from 2001 to 2007, playing 183 games for the team.
