= Ivan Ďurač =

Czech ice hockey player

- Born: July 17, 1997 (age 27); Czech Republic
- Height: 5 ft 10 in (178 cm)
- Weight: 168 lb (76 kg; 12 st 0 lb)
- Position: Forward
- Shoots: Right
- Czech team: BK Mladá Boleslav
- Playing career: 2015–present

Ivan Ďurač (born July 17, 1997) is a Czech professional ice hockey player. He is currently playing for BK Mladá Boleslav of the Czech Extraliga.

Ďurač made his Czech Extraliga debut playing with BK Mladá Boleslav during the 2015-16 Czech Extraliga season.
