= Miroslav Duben =

Czech professional ice hockey defenceman

- Born: November 8, 1974 (age 51) Havlíčkův Brod, Czechoslovakia
- Height: 6 ft 0 in (183 cm)
- Weight: 190 lb (86 kg; 13 st 8 lb)
- Position: Defence
- Shot: Left
- Played for: HC Dukla Jihlava; HC Pardubice; Bílí Tygři Liberec; HC Karlovy Vary; BK Mladá Boleslav; HC Vrchlabí; HK Nitra; HC Ledeč nad Sázavou; BK Havlíčkův Brod
- Playing career: 1997–2017

Miroslav Duben (born November 8, 1974) is a Czech professional ice hockey defenceman. He played with BK Mladá Boleslav in the Czech Extraliga during the 2010–11 Czech Extraliga season.

== Career statistics ==
			Regular season					Playoffs
Season	Team	League	GP	G	A	Pts	PIM	GP	G	A	Pts	PIM
1997–98	HC Dukla Jihlava	Czech	51	6	13	19	58	—	—	—	—	—
1998–99	HC Dukla Jihlava	Czech	52	2	9	11	48	—	—	—	—	—
1999–00	HC Pardubice	Czech	2	0	1	1	0	—	—	—	—	—
1999–00	HC Dukla Jihlava	Czech2	39	6	8	14	28	5	1	1	2	10
2000–01	HC Pardubice	Czech	41	2	5	7	30	7	0	1	1	4
2000–01	HC Dukla Jihlava	Czech2	14	2	2	4	16	—	—	—	—	—
2001–02	HC Pardubice	Czech	37	0	5	5	24	6	0	0	0	6
2001–02	HC Dukla Jihlava	Czech2	14	2	1	3	51	—	—	—	—	—
2002–03	HC Pardubice	Czech	50	2	6	8	42	18	2	0	2	28
2003–04	HC Pardubice	Czech	50	3	11	14	34	4	0	1	1	2
2004–05	Bílí Tygři Liberec	Czech	52	2	5	7	55	11	0	1	1	6
2005–06	HC Energie Karlovy Vary	Czech	51	3	5	8	56	—	—	—	—	—
2006–07	HC Energie Karlovy Vary	Czech	51	1	6	7	70	3	0	0	0	0
2007–08	HC Energie Karlovy Vary	Czech	52	4	5	9	48	12	0	1	1	18
2008–09	HC Energie Karlovy Vary	Czech	52	0	1	1	38	16	0	1	1	38
2009–10	BK Mladá Boleslav	Czech	50	2	4	6	68	—	—	—	—	—
2010–11	BK Mladá Boleslav	Czech	29	0	1	1	10	—	—	—	—	—
2010–11	HC Vrchlabí	Czech2	9	1	2	3	4	—	—	—	—	—
2010–11	HK Nitra	Slovak	6	0	0	0	2	5	0	0	0	8
2014–15	HC Ledeč nad Sázavou	Czech4	21	2	10	12	22	1	0	2	2	0
2015–16	BK Havlíčkův Brod	Czech3	34	1	15	16	48	6	0	0	0	28
2016–17	BK Havlíčkův Brod	Czech3	35	2	10	12	44	12	0	2	2	12
Czech totals			620	27	77	104	581	77	2	5	7	102
