= Ladislav Jetel =

Czech footballer

Personal information
- Full name: Ladislav Jan Jetel
- Date of birth: 3 June 1886
- Place of birth: Libeň, Austria-Hungary
- Date of death: 24 September 1914 (aged 28)
- Place of death: Parašnica, Austria-Hungary
- Position: Midfielder

Senior career*
Years	Team	Apps	(Gls)
1905–1913	Meteor Prague		

International career
1906	Bohemia	1	(0)
- * Club domestic league appearances and goals

Ladislav Jan Jetel (3 June 1886 – 24 September 1914) was a footballer who played as a midfielder.

== Club career ==
During his playing career, Jetel played for Meteor Prague between 1905 and 1913.

== International career ==
On 1 April 1906, Jetel made his debut for Bohemia in Bohemia's second game, (Note: The April 1906 meeting is regarded as the first official game for Bohemia by the Football Association of the Czech Republic (FAČR), with a meeting between Hungary and Bohemia on 5 April 1903 subsequently being recognised as a Prague representative team by the FAČR. The Hungarian Football Federation recognises the April 1903 meeting as official for Bohemia.) starting in a 1–1 draw against Hungary. It was Jetel's only cap for Bohemia.

== Death ==
On 24 September 1914, Jetel was killed in action in World War I in Parašnica, now in modern-day Serbia.
