= Jan Wasserbauer =

Czech ice hockey player

- Born: January 5, 1993 (age 32); Czech Republic
- Height: 5 ft 10 in (178 cm)
- Weight: 174 lb (79 kg; 12 st 6 lb)
- Position: Forward
- Shoots: Left
- Czech team: HC Kometa Brno
- NHL draft: Undrafted
- Playing career: 2012–present

Jan Wasserbauer (born January 5, 1993) is a Czech professional ice hockey player.

Wasserbauer made his Czech Extraliga debut for HC Kometa Brno during the 2012–13 Czech Extraliga season. His last appearance for the club was in the 2014-15 season.
