= Lukáš Křeček =

Czech footballer

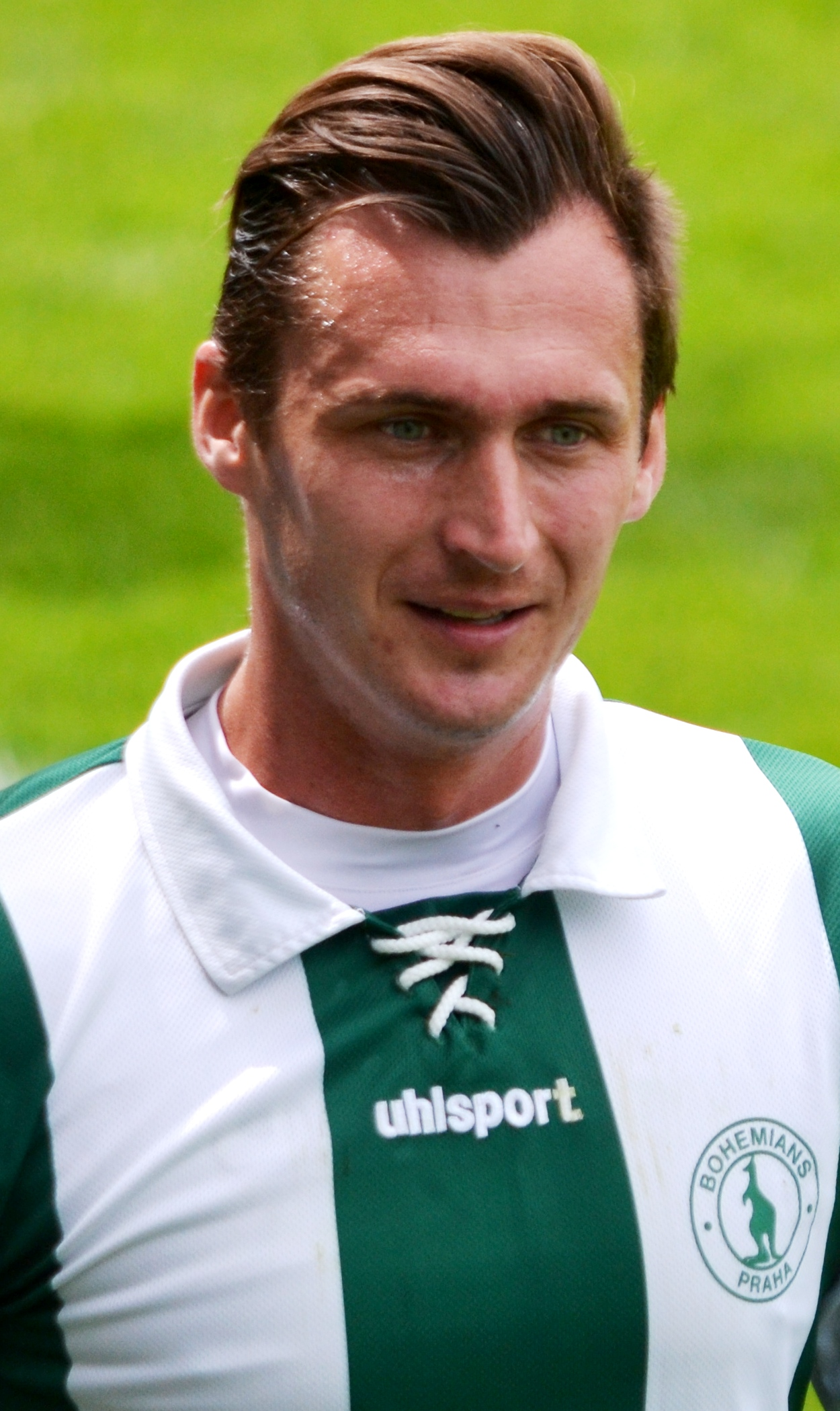

Personal information
- Date of birth: 18 September 1986 (age 40)
- Place of birth: Kladno, Czechoslovakia
- Height: 1.90 m (6 ft 3 in)
- Position: Midfielder

Team information
- Current team: FC Zbrojovka Brno
- Number: 6

Youth career
- 1991–1996: SK Slaný
- 1996–2006: SK Kladno

Senior career*
| Years | Team | Apps | (Gls) |
| 2006–2007 | SK Kladno | 0 | (0) |
| 2007–2009 | Vlašim | 78 | (8) |
| 2009– | FC Zbrojovka Brno | 14 | (0) |
| 2011–2012 | → SFC Opava (loan) | 36 | (9) |
| 2012–2013 | → Vlašim (loan) | 13 | (1) |
- * Club domestic league appearances and goals as of 25 April 2013

Lukáš Křeček (born 18 September 1986 in Kladno) is a Czech football player who currently plays for Vlašim on loan from FC Zbrojovka Brno.
