= Dominik Tejnor =

Czech ice hockey player

- Born: January 28, 1994 (age 31); Czech Republic
- Height: 6 ft 3 in (191 cm)
- Weight: 181 lb (82 kg; 12 st 13 lb)
- Position: Defence
- Shoots: Left
- Czech Extraliga team: Piráti Chomutov
- NHL draft: Undrafted
- Playing career: 2013–present

Dominik Tejnor (born January 28, 1994) is a Czech professional ice hockey defenceman. He currently plays with Piráti Chomutov in the Czech Extraliga.

Tejnor made his Czech Extraliga debut playing with Piráti Chomutov debut during the 2013–14 Czech Extraliga season.
