= Tomáš Kramný =

Czech ice hockey defenceman

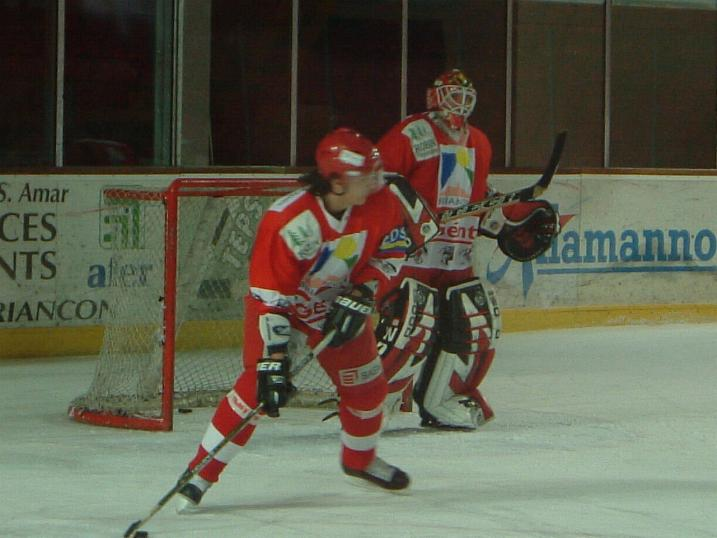
- Born: 8 June 1973 (age 51)
- Height: 6 ft 3 in (191 cm)
- Weight: 220 lb (100 kg; 15 st 10 lb)
- Position: Defence
- Shot: Right
- Played for: HC Slezan Opava; HC Vítkovice; HC Znojemští Orli; MsHK Žilina; Diables Rouges de Briançon; GKS Tychy
- Playing career: 1992–2010

Tomáš Kramný (born 8 June 1973) is a Czech former professional ice hockey defenceman.

Kramný played a total of 186 games in the Czech Extraliga, playing for HC Vítkovice, HC Slezan Opava and HC Znojemští Orli. He also played in the Tipsport Liga for MsHK Žilina, the Ligue Magnus for Diables Rouges de Briançon and the Polska Hokej Liga for GKS Tychy.
