= Michal Tvrdík =

Czech ice hockey player

- Born: July 23, 1979 (age 46) Pardubice, Czechoslovakia
- Height: 6 ft 1 in (185 cm)
- Weight: 198 lb (90 kg; 14 st 2 lb)
- Position: Forward
- Shoots: Left
- Czech Extraliga team: HC Plzeň
- Playing career: 1998–present

Michal Tvrdík (born July 23, 1979) is a Czech professional ice hockey player. He played with HC Plzeň in the Czech Extraliga during the 2010–11 Czech Extraliga season.
