= Lukáš Marek =

Czech footballer (born 1981)

Personal information
- Date of birth: 30 January 1981 (age 45)
- Place of birth: Czechoslovakia
- Position: Defender

Senior career*
Years	Team	Apps	(Gls)
2000–2006	SC Xaverov		
2006–2009	Bohemians 1905	23	(0)

International career
2001	Czech Republic U20	1	(0)
2002	Czech Republic U21	2	(0)
- * Club domestic league appearances and goals

Lukáš Marek (born 30 January 1981) is a retired Czech football player who played in the Czech First League for Bohemians 1905.
