= Michal Pavel =

Czech ice hockey player

- Born: June 16, 1986 (age 38)
- Height: 5 ft 9 in (175 cm)
- Weight: 150 lb (68 kg; 10 st 10 lb)
- Position: Forward
- Shoots: Left
- Czech Extraliga team: HC Sparta Praha
- Playing career: 2006–present

Michal Pavel (born June 16, 1986) is a Czech professional ice hockey player. He played with HC Sparta Praha in the Czech Extraliga during the 2010–11 Czech Extraliga postseason.
