= Rostislav Šnajnar =

Ice hockey player (born 1997)

- Born: January 21, 1997 (age 29) Přísnotice, Czech Republic
- Height: 6 ft 0 in (183 cm)
- Weight: 181 lb (82 kg; 12 st 13 lb)
- Position: Defense
- Shoots: Right
- Czech 1.liga team Former teams: HC ZUBR Přerov; HC Kometa Brno
- Playing career: 2015–present

Rostislav Šnajnar (born January 21, 1997) is a Czech professional ice hockey player. He is currently playing for HC ZUBR Přerov in the Czech 1.liga.

Šnajnar made his Czech Extraliga debut playing with HC Kometa Brno during the 2015-16 Czech Extraliga season.
