= Richard Kristl =

Czech ice hockey player

- Born: December 14, 1995 (age 29); Czech Republic
- Height: 5 ft 10 in (178 cm)
- Weight: 194 lb (88 kg; 13 st 12 lb)
- Position: Forward
- Shoots: Left
- Czech 1.liga team Former teams: SK Horacka Slavia Trebic; HC Plzeň
- Playing career: 2014–present

Richard Kristl (born November 14, 1995) is a Czech professional ice hockey player. He is currently playing for SK Horácká Slavia Třebíč of the Czech 1.liga.

Kristl made his Czech Extraliga debut playing with HC Plzeň during the 2015-16 Czech Extraliga season.
