= Jiří Petrů =

Czech footballer (born 1985)

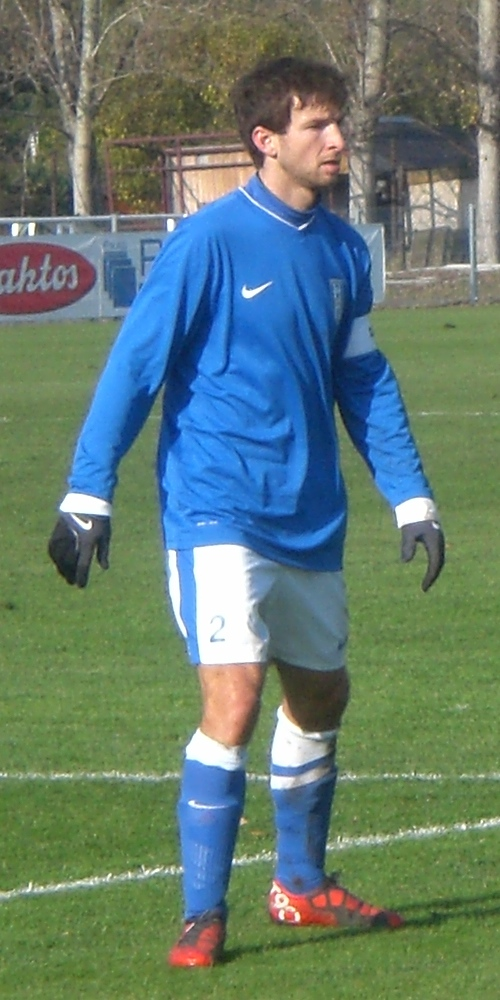

Personal information
- Date of birth: 17 February 1985 (age 41)
- Place of birth: Třebíč, Czechoslovakia
- Height: 1.84 m (6 ft 1/2 in)
- Position: Defender

Team information
- Current team: Vlašim
- Number: 2

Youth career
- 1991–1999: TJ Jiskra Zruč nad Sázavou
- 1999: SK Sparta Kutná Hora
- 1999–2000: TJ Jiskra Zruč nad Sázavou
- 2000–2005: AC Sparta Prague

Senior career*
Years	Team	Apps	(Gls)
2005–2006	FK Graffin Kácov		
2006–2009	Vlašim		
2009–2010	Viktoria Žižkov	18	(0)
2010–	Vlašim	54	(7)
- * Club domestic league appearances and goals as of 30 June 2012

Jiří Petrů (born 17 February 1985) is a Czech football defender currently playing for Vlašim.
