= Daniel Branda =

Czech professional ice hockey forward

- Born: 20 February 1976 (age 49); Chomutov, Czechoslovakia
- Height: 5 ft 10 in (178 cm)
- Weight: 176 lb (80 kg; 12 st 8 lb)
- Position: Forward
- Shot: Left
- Played for: HC Litvínov; HC Slavia Praha; HC Sparta Praha; HC Plzeň; HC Sibir Novosibirsk; HC Kladno
- NHL draft: Undrafted
- Playing career: 1997–2011

Daniel Branda (born 20 February 1976) is a Czech former professional ice hockey forward who played in the Czech Extraliga (ELH) for HC Litvínov, HC Slavia Praha, HC Sparta Praha, HC Plzeň, and HC Kladno. He also played in the Russian Superleague (RSL) for HC Sibir Novosibirsk.
