= Jan Penc =

Czech footballer (born 1982)

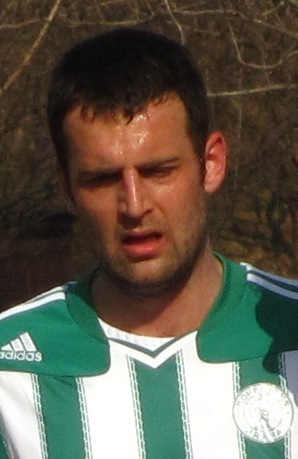
- Penc in 2012

Personal information
- Date of birth: 31 January 1982 (age 44)
- Place of birth: Prague, Czechoslovakia
- Height: 1.94 m (6 ft 4 in)
- Position: Defender

Senior career*
| Years | Team | Apps | (Gls) |
| 2002–2003 | Slavia Prague | | |
| 2003–2006 | Xaverov | | |
| 2006–2007 | 1. FK Příbram | | |
| 2007 | Bohemians Prague | | |
| 2007–2009 | 1. FK Příbram | 9 | (0) |
| 2009 | → FC Vysočina Jihlava (loan) | 8 | (1) |
| 2011–2013 | Bohemians Prague | 51 | (8) |
| 2013–2017 | FC Oberlausitz Neugersdorf | 118 | (3) |
- * Club domestic league appearances and goals

Jan Penc (born 31 January 1982) is a Czech former professional footballer who played as a defender.
