= Petr Jíra =

Czech ice hockey player

- Born: August 10, 1978 (age 46); Czechoslovakia
- Height: 5 ft 9 in (175 cm)
- Weight: 165 lb (75 kg; 11 st 11 lb)
- Position: Right wing
- Shoots: Right
- Czech 4 team: Piráti Chomutov
- Playing career: 1997–present

Petr Jíra (born August 10, 1978) is a Czech professional ice hockey player and head coach for Piráti Chomutov U20. He currently plays with Piráti Chomutov in the Krajská hokejová liga ústeckého kraje.

Jíra made his Czech Extraliga debut playing with HC Slavia Praha debut during the 2000–01 Czech Extraliga season.
