= Rostislav Marosz =

Czech ice hockey player

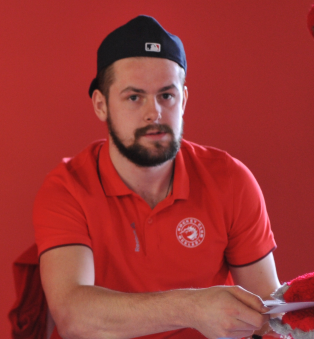
- Rostislav Marosz in 2017
- Born: 23 February 1991 (age 35) Třinec, Czechoslovakia
- Height: 5 ft 11 in (180 cm)
- Weight: 176 lb (80 kg; 12 st 8 lb)
- Position: Forward
- Shoots: Right
- Slovak team Former teams: HK Spišská Nová Ves; HC Oceláři Třinec; HC Olomouc; HK Dukla Trenčín; HC Energie Karlovy Vary; HC Dynamo Pardubice; HC Bílí Tygři Liberec; Rytíři Kladno; HC Vítkovice Ridera
- Playing career: 2010–present

Rostislav Marosz (born 23 February 1991) is a Czech professional ice hockey player currently playing for HK Spišská Nová Ves of the Slovak Extraliga.

Marosz has previously played with HC Oceláři Třinec, HC Olomouc, HC Energie Karlovy Vary and HC Dynamo Pardubice. He also played in the Slovak Extraliga for HK Dukla Trenčín.

== Career statistics ==
=== Regular season and playoffs ===
| | | | Regular season | | | | | Playoffs |
| Season | Team | League | GP | G | A | Pts | PIM | GP | G | A | Pts | PIM |
