= Tomáš Pastor =

Czech ice hockey player

- Born: September 6, 1992 (age 33); Ostrava, Czechoslovakia
- Height: 6 ft 3 in (191 cm)
- Weight: 210 lb (95 kg; 15 st 0 lb)
- Position: Defense
- Shoots: Left
- Czech team Former teams: AZ Havířov; HC Vítkovice Steel
- NHL draft: Undrafted
- Playing career: 2012–present

Tomáš Pastor (born September 6, 1992) is a Czech professional ice hockey player. He is currently playing for AZ Havířov of the Czech Chance liga.

Pastor made his Czech Extraliga debut playing with HC Vítkovice Steel during the 2012-13 Czech Extraliga season.
