= Lukáš Michna =

Czech footballer

Personal information
- Date of birth: 28 April 1990 (age 36)
- Place of birth: Brno, Czechoslovakia
- Height: 1.79 m (5 ft 10 1/2 in)
- Position: Midfielder

Youth career
- 1995–1998: Sokol Troubsko
- 1998–2009: FC Zbrojovka Brno

Senior career*
| Years | Team | Apps | (Gls) |
| 2009–2012 | FC Zbrojovka Brno | 23 | (0) |
- * Club domestic league appearances and goals

Lukáš Michna (born 28 April 1990) is a Czech football player who played for FC Zbrojovka Brno.
