= 2011–12 Czech Extraliga season =

2011–12 Czech Extraliga
- League: Czech Extraliga
- Sport: Ice hockey
- Duration: September 2011 – February 2012
- Teams: 14
- TV partner: Czech Television

Regular season
- Presidential Cup: HC Sparta Praha
- Top scorer: Petr Kumstát (Karlovy Vary)

Playoffs

Finals
- Champions: HC ČSOB Pojišťovna Pardubice
- Runners-up: HC Kometa Brno

Czech Extraliga seasons
- ← 2010–11 2012–13 →

The 2011–12 Czech Extraliga season was the 19th season of the Czech Extraliga since its creation after the breakup of Czechoslovakia and the Czechoslovak First Ice Hockey League in 1993. HC ČSOB Pojišťovna Pardubice won their third title in seven years, and sixth national title overall, after beating HC Kometa Brno by 4 games to 2 in the finals.

== Standings ==
As of 26 February 2012

Place	Team	GP	W	OTW	OTL	L	GF	GA	Pts
1	HC Sparta Praha	52	27	8	10	7	163	109	107
2	HC Plzeň 1929	52	26	7	7	12	181	146	99
3	HC ČSOB Pojišťovna Pardubice	52	23	5	7	17	175	136	86
4	HC Bílí Tygři Liberec	52	19	11	5	17	145	140	84
5	HC Mountfield České Budějovice	52	23	5	4	20	129	127	83
6	HC Vítkovice Steel	52	20	7	3	22	143	150	77
7	PSG Zlín	52	18	6	10	18	107	125	76
8	HC Kometa Brno	52	19	6	6	21	142	137	75
9	Rytíři Kladno	52	18	5	7	21	129	140	74
10	HC Oceláři Třinec	52	19	4	8	21	146	143	73
11	HC Energie Karlovy Vary	52	17	5	6	24	137	154	67
12	HC Slavia Praha	52	15	7	7	23	140	158	66
13	HC VERVA Litvínov	52	14	9	4	25	138	171	64
14	BK Mladá Boleslav	52	16	4	5	27	120	159	61

== Playoffs ==
=== Bracket ===
The playoff bracket is not a fixed bracket. Like the intraconference bracket in the NHL, the matchups are adjusted in each successive round in order to place the top-ranked team against the bottom-ranked team.

First round February 29–March 6
8	Brno	3
9	Kladno	0
7	Zlín	3
10	Třinec	2

Quarterfinals; March 8–21
1	Sparta	2
8	Brno	4
3	Pardubice	4
6	Vítkovice	3
4	Liberec	4
5	České Budějovice	1
2	Plzeň	4
7	Zlín	3

Semifinals; March 24–April 3
2	Plzeň	1
8	Brno	4
3	Pardubice	4
4	Liberec	2

Finals; April 9–21
3	Pardubice	4
8	Brno	2

== Relegation ==
Place	Team	GP	W	OTW	OTL	L	GF	GA	Pts
1	HC Energie Karlovy Vary	64	23	5	7	29	179	193	86
2	HC Slavia Praha	64	21	7	8	28	170	185	85
3	HC VERVA Litvínov	64	19	11	4	30	170	206	83
4	BK Mladá Boleslav	64	20	5	6	33	154	196	76
