= 2012 European Trophy =

Trophy awarded annually for an ice hockey tournament

Tournament details
- Venues: 43 (in 40 host cities)
- Dates: 31 July – 16 December 2012
- Teams: 32

Tournament statistics
- Games played: 98
- Goals scored: 577 (5.89 per game)
- Attendance: 269,779 (2,753 per game)
- Scoring leader: (United States) Jack Connolly (11 points)

The 2012 European Trophy was the third European Trophy, a European ice hockey tournament held annually. It is also the seventh tournament since its predecessor, the Nordic Trophy, was launched in 2006. The regulation round started on 31 July 2012 with the South Division game between Piráti Chomutov–Slovan Bratislava, and will end on 28 November 2012. The playoffs will be played between 13 and 16 December 2012 in Vienna and in Bratislava. The preliminary schedule for the regulation round was released on 12 April 2012.

In this year's tournament the number of participating teams was increased from 24 to 32. Also, as Red Bull Salzburg no longer hosted the playoffs for the first time in European Trophy history, they weren't guaranteed a playoff spot. Of the 128 regular round games, 20 were played mid-season (i.e. after teams had started their league seasons in their respective countries). Regarding the playoffs, there were only Quarterfinals, Semifinals as well as the Final game, meaning that the losing teams in each round were immediately eliminated from the tournament.

On 31 May 2012, Slavia Praha announced that they were pulling out of the tournament. On 18 June it was announced that Piráti Chomutov would take over Slavia Praha's spot in the South Division.

== Tournament format ==
The 32 teams in the tournament are, partly based on geographical location, divided into four divisions: the West Division, the North Division, the South Division, and the East Division. Each division consists of 8 teams who will play a round-robin in their division, with an extra game against a local rival in their division, giving a total of 8 games per team. Each team is assigned four home games as well as four road games. The top two teams of each division qualify for the playoffs; however, should Slovan Bratislava and/or Vienna Capitals qualify for the playoffs as hosts (if they fail to reach one of the top two spots of the South Division), they will replace the worst second ranked team(s) out of all four divisions.

Should at least two teams in the same division (or second-ranked teams) end up tied in points, the following tie-breaker format will be used:

1. Best goal difference
2. Most goals scored in total (goals forward)
3. Results in games against the tied teams
4. Drawing of lots

This tie-breaker format will also apply when determining which second-ranked team(s) to be replaced if the host teams Slovan Bratislava and/or Vienna Capitals fail to reach the playoffs by finishing top two in the South Division.

=== Playing format ===
If a game is tied after regulation time (60 minutes), an overtime lasting for 5 minutes is played. During overtime, both teams substitute only 4 players on the ice at once (except for 3 when either of the teams has a penalized player). If no team scores during the overtime period, a shootout is played, starting with three penalty shots for both teams. If the shootout remains tied after the first three rounds, sudden death rounds are played until a winning team has been forced.

In the regulation round games, the teams get three points for a regulation-time victory, two points for an overtime/shootout win, one point for losing in overtime/shootout, and zero points for a regulation loss.

=== Prize money ===
After the regulation round, the four division winners received €25 000 each, the four second-placed teams €20 000, and the third, fourth and fifth team of each division received €15 000, €10 000, and €5 000, respectively. Additionally, in the final of the Red Bulls Salute, the winning team received €50 000, while the losing finalist got €10 000. In total, €360 000 was given out during the entire tournament.

== Participating clubs ==
2012 European Trophy Nordic teams (Divisions:: North,: West,: South,: East)
2012 European Trophy Central European teams (Divisions:: North,: West,: South,: East)

Division	Team	City	Home arena^{*}	Capacity	Joined NT/ET
North	Oulun Kärpät	(Finland) Oulu	Oulun Energia Areena	6,614	2006
North	Eisbären Berlin	(Germany) Berlin	O2 World	14,200	2010
North	Red Bull Salzburg	(Austria) Salzburg	Eisarena Salzburg	3,600	2010
North	Luleå HF	(Sweden) Luleå	Coop Norrbotten Arena	6,200	2011
North	Kometa Brno	(Czech Republic) Brno	Kajot Arena	7,200	2011
North	Mountfield České Budějovice	(Czech Republic) České Budějovice	Budvar Arena	6,421	2011
North	Plzeň 1929	(Czech Republic) Plzeň	ČEZ Aréna	8,420	2011
North	Hamburg Freezers	(Germany) Hamburg	O2 World	12,947	2012
South	Linköpings HC	(Sweden) Linköping	Cloetta Center	8,500	2006
South	HV71	(Sweden) Jönköping	Kinnarps Arena	7,038	2008
South	Sparta Praha	(Czech Republic) Prague	Tipsport Arena	13,150	2010
South	Piráti Chomutov^{***}	(Czech Republic) Chomutov	Multifunkční aréna Chomutov	5,250	2012
South	KalPa	(Finland) Kuopio	Kuopion Jäähalli	5,225	2011
South	Slovan Bratislava	(Slovakia) Bratislava	Slovnaft Arena	10,000	2011
South	UPC Vienna Capitals	(Austria) Vienna	Albert Schultz Eishalle	7,000	2011
South	JYP	(Finland) Jyväskylä	Synergia-areena	4,628	2012
East	TPS	(Finland) Turku	HK Arena	11,820	2006
East	Tappara	(Finland) Tampere	Hakametsä Areena	7,800	2006
East	Djurgårdens IF	(Sweden) Stockholm	Hovet	8,094	2006
East	SC Bern	(Switzerland) Bern	PostFinance-Arena	17,131	2010^{**}
East	Bílí Tygři Liberec	(Czech Republic) Liberec	Tipsport Arena	7,500	2011
East	ČSOB Pojišťovna Pardubice	(Czech Republic) Pardubice	ČEZ Aréna	10,194	2011
East	Brynäs IF	(Sweden) Gävle	Läkerol Arena	8,585	2012
East	HC Fribourg-Gottéron	(Switzerland) Fribourg	BCF Arena	6,900	2012
West	Färjestad BK	(Sweden) Karlstad	Löfbergs Lila Arena	8,647	2006
West	Frölunda Indians	(Sweden) Gothenburg	Scandinavium	12,044	2006
West	HIFK	(Finland) Helsinki	Helsinki Ice Hall	8,200	2006
West	Jokerit	(Finland) Helsinki	Hartwall Areena	13,349	2008
West	ZSC Lions	(Switzerland) Zurich	Hallenstadion	10,700	2010^{**}
West	Adler Mannheim	(Germany) Mannheim	SAP Arena	10,600	2010
West	ERC Ingolstadt	(Germany) Ingolstadt	Saturn Arena	4,815	2012
West	EV Zug	(Switzerland) Zug	Bossard Arena	7,015	2012

- Note (*): the stated home arenas don't have to be used in the European Trophy tournament.
- Note (**): SC Bern and ZSC Lions did not participate in 2011.
- Note (***): Slavia Praha pulled out of the tournament just two months before the first games are to be played. Piráti Chomutov are replacing Slavia Praha.

== Rivalries ==
- West Division
  - Jokerit vs. HIFK
  - Frölunda Indians vs. Färjestad BK
  - Adler Mannheim vs. ERC Ingolstadt
  - ZSC Lions vs. EV Zug
- North Division
  - Luleå HF vs. Oulun Kärpät
  - Hamburg Freezers vs. Eisbären Berlin
  - Kometa Brno vs. Plzeň 1929
  - České Budějovice vs. Red Bull Salzburg
- South Division
  - KalPa vs. JYP
  - Linköpings HC vs. HV71
  - Piráti Chomutov vs. Sparta Praha
  - Vienna Capitals vs. Slovan Bratislava
- East Division
  - Tappara vs. TPS
  - Brynäs IF vs. Djurgårdens IF
  - Bílí Tygři Liberec vs. Pojišťovna Pardubice
  - SC Bern vs. Fribourg-Gottéron

== Regulation round ==
Team is qualified for the playoffs
Team is eliminated from the tournament

=== West Division ===
Team	GP	W	OTW	OTL	L	GF	GA	+/–	Pts
(Switzerland) EV Zug	8	4	2	0	2	30	21	+9	16
(Finland) Jokerit	7	4	1	1	1	23	14	+9	15
(Sweden) Färjestad BK	7	3	2	1	1	25	16	+9	14
(Germany) ERC Ingolstadt	8	3	1	3	1	34	30	+4	14
(Sweden) Frölunda Indians	8	3	0	2	3	18	32	–14	11
(Finland) HIFK	8	2	0	2	4	24	26	–2	8
(Switzerland) ZSC Lions	8	2	1	0	5	17	24	–7	8
(Germany) Adler Mannheim	8	1	2	0	5	18	26	–8	7

Games in Finland are UTC+3, while all other games are UTC+2, except the 28 October game which is UTC+1.

12 August 2012; 16:00	ERC Ingolstadt (Germany)	3–4 GWS (1–0, 1–2, 1–1) (OT: 0–0) (SO: 0–1)	(Switzerland) ZSC Lions	Saturn Arena, Ingolstadt; Attendance: 3,036

Game reference

Ian Gordon
Goalies
Lukas Flueler
Referees:
(Germany) Stephan Bauer
(Germany) Daniel Piechaczek

P. Hager (J. Ross, T. Conboy) – 16:32	1–0
J. Motzko (J. Ross, C. Gawlik) (PP) – 23:22	2–0
	2–1	27:22 – J. Tambellini (P. Bärtschi, R. Shannon)
	2–2	38:21 – M. Bastl (M. Trachsler, P. Geering)
D. Hahn (P. Hager, T. Greillinger) – 40:26	3–2
	3–3	44:35 – R. Shannon (J. Tambellini, M. Bastl)

J. Ross
P. Hager (miss)
T. Greillinger (miss)
D. Hahn (miss)
J. Motzko (miss)
P. Hager (miss)
Shootout
(miss) R. Shannon
(miss) T. Monnet
J. Tambellini
(miss) A. Ambühl
(miss) P. Bärtschi
L. Cunti
22 min
Penalties
24 min
17
Shots
38

17 August 2012; 18:00	HIFK (Finland)	4–0 (0–0, 4–0, 0–0)	(Germany) Adler Mannheim	Valtti Areena, Vantaa; Attendance: 1,639

Game reference

Joni Ortio
Goalies
Dennis Endras
Referees:
(Finland) Mikko Kaukokari
(Finland) Tom Laaksonen

?	1–0
?	2–0
?	3–0
?	4–0

33 min
Penalties
20 min
61
Shots
30

17 August 2012; 19:00	Färjestad BK (Sweden)	5–2 (1–0, 4–2, 0–0)	(Switzerland) ZSC Lions	Löfbergs Lila Arena, Karlstad; Attendance: 3,451

Game reference

Alexander Salak
Goalies
Lukas Flüeler
Referees:
(Sweden) Marcus Vinnerborg
(Sweden) Christer Karlsson
Linesmen:
(Sweden) Ola Adamsson
(Sweden) Andreas Malmqvist

?	1–0
	1–1	?
?	2–1
	2–2	?
?	3–2
?	4–2
?	5–2

20 min
Penalties
33 min
30
Shots
21

17 August 2012; 19:00	Frölunda Indians (Sweden)	3–2 (0–0, 3–2, 0–0)	(Switzerland) EV Zug	Frölundaborg, Gothenburg; Attendance: 1,427

Game reference

Patrick Galbraith
Goalies
Jussi Markkanen
Referees:
(Sweden) Sören Persson
(Sweden) Mikael Holm

	0–1	?
?	1–1
?	2–1
?	3–1
	3–2	?

8 min
Penalties
12 min
41
Shots
22

18 August 2012; 14:00	HIFK (Finland)	3–5 (1–1, 2–1, 0–3)	(Germany) ERC Ingolstadt	Valtti Areena, Vantaa; Attendance: 1,281

Game reference

Mika Norja
Joni Ortio
Goalies
Markus Janka
Referees:
(Finland) Jukka Hakkarainen
(Finland) Joonas Pinomaa
Linesmen:
(Sweden) Daniel Österholm
(Finland) Joonas Saha

	0–1	?
?	1–1
	1–2	?
?	2–2
?	3–2
	3–3	?
	3–4	?
	3–5	?

12 min
Penalties
26 min
37
Shots
36

18 August 2012; 15:00	Frölunda Indians (Sweden)	2–0 (1–0, 0–0, 1–0)	(Switzerland) ZSC Lions	Frölundaborg, Gothenburg; Attendance: 1,344

Game reference
Július Hudáček	Goalies	Tim Wolf	Referees: (Sweden) Marcus Vinnerborg (Sweden) Mikael Holm
? / 1–0; ? / 2–0			Referees: (Sweden) Marcus Vinnerborg (Sweden) Mikael Holm
12 min	Penalties	10 min	Referees: (Sweden) Marcus Vinnerborg (Sweden) Mikael Holm
24	Shots	29	Referees: (Sweden) Marcus Vinnerborg (Sweden) Mikael Holm

18 August 2012; 17:00	Färjestad BK (Sweden)	1–2 (1–1, 0–0, 0–1)	(Switzerland) EV Zug	Löfbergs Lila Arena, Karlstad; Attendance: 1,909

Game reference

Fredrik Pettersson-Wentzel
Goalies
Sandro Zurkirchen
Referee:
(Sweden) Mikael Nord

?	1–0
	1–1	?
	1–2	?

6 min
Penalties
16 min
40
Shots
12

18 August 2012; 19:30	Jokerit (Finland)	1–2 GWS (0–0, 1–1, 0–0) (OT: 0–0) (SO: 0–1)	(Germany) Adler Mannheim	Valtti Areena, Vantaa; Attendance: 1,601

Game reference
Eero Kilpeläinen	Goalies	Felix Brückmann	Referees: (Finland) Mikko Kaukokari (Finland) Tom Laaksonen; Linesmen: (Finland) Jari Korteniemi (Finland) Masi Puolakka
? / 1–0; / 1–1 / ?			Referees: (Finland) Mikko Kaukokari (Finland) Tom Laaksonen; Linesmen: (Finland) Jari Korteniemi (Finland) Masi Puolakka
?	Shootout	?	Referees: (Finland) Mikko Kaukokari (Finland) Tom Laaksonen; Linesmen: (Finland) Jari Korteniemi (Finland) Masi Puolakka
12 min	Penalties	18 min	Referees: (Finland) Mikko Kaukokari (Finland) Tom Laaksonen; Linesmen: (Finland) Jari Korteniemi (Finland) Masi Puolakka
35	Shots	25	Referees: (Finland) Mikko Kaukokari (Finland) Tom Laaksonen; Linesmen: (Finland) Jari Korteniemi (Finland) Masi Puolakka

19 August 2012; 17:00	Jokerit (Finland)	2–1 (0–0, 0–1, 2–0)	(Germany) ERC Ingolstadt	Valtti Areena, Vantaa; Attendance: 1,572

24 August 2012; 19:30	ERC Ingolstadt (Germany)	8-5 (4-3, 1-1, 3-1)	(Sweden) Frölunda Indians	Saturn Arena, Ingolstadt; Attendance: 2,125

24 August 2012; 19:30	Adler Mannheim (Germany)	2-4 (0–1, 0–2, 2–1)	(Sweden) Färjestad BK	SAP Arena, Mannheim

24 August 2012; 19:45	EV Zug (Switzerland)	v	(Finland) Jokerit	Bossard Arena, Zug

24 August 2012; 20:00	ZSC Lions (Switzerland)	v	(Finland) HIFK	Kunsteisbahn KEK, Küsnacht

25 August 2012; 17:30	ZSC Lions (Switzerland)	v	(Finland) Jokerit	Kunsteisbahn KEK, Küsnacht

25 August 2012; 18:00	EV Zug (Switzerland)	v	(Finland) HIFK	Bossard Arena, Zug

26 August 2012; 15:00	Adler Mannheim (Germany)	3-1 (0–2, 0–0, 1–1)	(Sweden) Frölunda Indians	SAP Arena, Mannheim

Felix Bruckmann	Goalies

26 August 2012; 18:30	ERC Ingolstadt (Germany)	v	(Sweden) Färjestad BK	Saturn Arena, Ingolstadt

29 August 2012; 19:30	ERC Ingolstadt (Germany)	v	(Germany) Adler Mannheim	Saturn Arena, Ingolstadt

31 August 2012; 18:30	HIFK (Finland)	v	(Finland) Jokerit	Helsinki Ice Hall, Helsinki

31 August 2012; 19:00	Färjestad BK (Sweden)	v	(Sweden) Frölunda Indians	Löfbergs Lila Arena, Karlstad

31 August 2012; 19:30	Adler Mannheim (Germany)	v	(Germany) ERC Ingolstadt	SAP Arena, Mannheim

31 August 2012; 19:45	EV Zug (Switzerland)	v	(Switzerland) ZSC Lions	Bossard Arena, Zug

1 September 2012; 16:00	Frölunda Indians (Sweden)	v	(Sweden) Färjestad BK	Frölundaborg, Gothenburg

1 September 2012; 17:00	Jokerit (Finland)	v	(Finland) HIFK	Hartwall Areena, Helsinki

1 September 2012; 19:00	ZSC Lions (Switzerland)	v	(Switzerland) EV Zug	Eishalle Oerlikon, Zurich

6 September 2012; 18:30	HIFK (Finland)	v	(Sweden) Färjestad BK	Helsinki Ice Hall, Helsinki

7 September 2012; 18:30	Jokerit (Finland)	v	(Sweden) Frölunda Indians	Hartwall Areena, Helsinki

7 September 2012; 19:45	EV Zug (Switzerland)	v	(Germany) ERC Ingolstadt	Bossard Arena, Zug

7 September 2012; 20:00	ZSC Lions (Switzerland)	v	(Germany) Adler Mannheim	Kunsteisbahn KEK, Küsnacht

16 October 2012; 19:30	Adler Mannheim (Germany)	v	(Switzerland) EV Zug	SAP Arena, Mannheim

22 October 2012; 19:00	Frölunda Indians (Sweden)	v	(Finland) HIFK	Frölundaborg, Gothenburg

28 October 2012; 19:00	Färjestad BK (Sweden)	v	(Finland) Jokerit	Löfbergs Lila Arena, Karlstad

=== North Division ===
Team	GP	W	OTW	OTL	L	GF	GA	+/–	Pts
(Sweden) Luleå HF	8	7	0	0	1	33	13	+20	21
(Germany) Eisbären Berlin	8	6	0	1	1	27	15	+12	19
(Germany) Hamburg Freezers	8	3	2	0	3	28	24	+4	13
(Czech Republic) Kometa Brno	7	3	0	1	3	20	30	–10	10
(Czech Republic) České Budějovice	7	3	0	0	4	17	20	–3	9
(Austria) Red Bull Salzburg	7	3	0	0	4	18	24	–6	9
(Finland) Oulun Kärpät	8	1	1	2	4	18	26	–8	7
(Czech Republic) Plzeň 1929	7	0	1	0	6	18	27	–9	2

Games in Finland are UTC+3, while all other games are UTC+2, except the November games which are UTC+1.

17 August 2012; 19:00	Oulun Kärpät (Finland)	3–5 (2–1, 0–2, 1–2)	(Austria) Red Bull Salzburg	Kajaanin jäähalli, Kajaani; Attendance: 948

Game reference

Johan Backlund
Goalies
Alex Auld
Referees:
(Finland) Vesa Keränen
(Finland) Tuomo Sorakangas
Linesmen:
(Finland) Lasse Lappalainen
(Finland) Samuli Orava

?	1–0
?	2–0
	2–1	?
	2–2	?
	2–3	?
?	3–3
	3–4	?
	3–5	?

14 min
Penalties
16 min
51
Shots
34

17 August 2012; 19:00	Luleå HF (Sweden)	5–2 (2–1, 1–0, 2–1)	(Czech Republic) České Budějovice	Coop Norrbotten Arena, Luleå; Attendance: 3,305

Game reference

Johan Gustafsson
Goalies
Jakub Kovář
Referees:
(Sweden) Tobias Björk
(Sweden) Linus Öhlund
Linesmen:
(Sweden) Jan Sandström
(Sweden) Johannes Käck

?	1–0
?	2–0
	2–1	?
?	3–1
?	4–1
	4–2	?
?	5–2

6 min
Penalties
18 min
32
Shots
21

17 August 2012; 19:30	Eisbären Berlin (Germany)	6–4 (3–0, 3–3, 0–1)	(Czech Republic) Plzeň 1929	O2 World, Berlin; Attendance: 7,200

Game reference

Rob Zepp
Goalies
Adam Svoboda
Marek Mazanec
Referees:
(Germany) Marcus Brill
(Germany) Carsten Lenhart

?	1–0
?	2–0
?	3–0
?	4–0
?	5–0
?	6–0
	6–1	?
	6–2	?
	6–3	?
	6–4	?

6 min
Penalties
47 min
31
Shots
34

17 August 2012; 20:00	Hamburg Freezers (Germany)	7–3 (2–1, 1–1, 4–1)	(Czech Republic) Kometa Brno	Kunsteisstadion Crimmitschau, Crimmitschau; Attendance: 1,257

Game reference

Niklas Treutle
Goalies
Martin Falter
Referees:
(Germany) Richard Schütz
(Germany) Jens Steinecke
Linesmen:
(Germany) Andreas Flad
(Germany) Sirko Schulz

	0–1	?
?	1–1
?	2–1
	2–2	?
?	3–2
?	4–2
?	5–2
	5–3	?
?	6–3
?	7–3

26 min
Penalties
40 min
25
Shots
23

19 August 2012; 16:00	Hamburg Freezers (Germany)	3–2 (3–0, 0–1, 0–1)	(Czech Republic) Plzeň 1929	Eisarena Bremerhaven, Bremerhaven

19 August 2012; 16:30	Eisbären Berlin (Germany)	6–1 (1–0, 4–0, 1–1)	(Czech Republic) Kometa Brno	O2 World, Berlin

19 August 2012; 17:00	Luleå HF (Sweden)	7–2 (4–2, 1–0, 2–0)	(Austria) Red Bull Salzburg	Coop Norrbotten Arena, Luleå

19 August 2012; 17:00	Oulun Kärpät (Finland)	3–1 (1–0, 1–0, 1–1)	(Czech Republic) České Budějovice	Raahen jäähalli, Raahe

21 August 2012; 19:00	Luleå HF (Sweden)	3–1 (1–0, 0–1, 2–0)	(Finland) Oulun Kärpät	Coop Norrbotten Arena, Luleå; Attendance: 4,065

Game reference

Johan Gustafsson
Goalies
Johan Backlund
Referees:
(Sweden) Mikael Nord
(Sweden) Pehr Claesson
Linesmen:
(Sweden) Jan Sandström
(Sweden) Johannes Käck

J. Jakobs – 17:33	1–0
	1–1	26:07 – J. Huovinen
N. Fogström (J. Vihko) – 50:12	2–1
A. Hedman (N. Fogström, J. Berglund) (ENG) – 58:27	3–1

10 min
Penalties
0 min
20
Shots
23

24 August 2012; 17:30	Plzeň 1929 (Czech Republic)	v	(Finland) Oulun Kärpät	ČEZ Aréna, Plzeň

24 August 2012; 17:30	České Budějovice (Czech Republic)	v	(Germany) Hamburg Freezers	Budvar Arena, České Budějovice

24 August 2012; 18:00	Kometa Brno (Czech Republic)	v	(Sweden) Luleå HF	Kajot Arena, Brno

24 August 2012; 19:15	Red Bull Salzburg (Austria)	v	(Germany) Eisbären Berlin	Eisarena Salzburg, Salzburg

26 August 2012; 17:00	Kometa Brno (Czech Republic)	v	(Finland) Oulun Kärpät	Kajot Arena, Brno

26 August 2012; 17:00	České Budějovice (Czech Republic)	v	(Germany) Eisbären Berlin	Budvar Arena, České Budějovice

26 August 2012; 19:00	Plzeň 1929 (Czech Republic)	v	(Sweden) Luleå HF	ČEZ Aréna, Plzeň

26 August 2012; 19:15	Red Bull Salzburg (Austria)	v	(Germany) Hamburg Freezers	Eisarena Salzburg, Salzburg

30 August 2012; 18:30	Oulun Kärpät (Finland)	v	(Sweden) Luleå HF	Tornio Arena, Tornio

30 August 2012; 19:15	Red Bull Salzburg (Austria)	v	(Czech Republic) České Budějovice	Eisarena Salzburg, Salzburg

31 August 2012; 17:30	Plzeň 1929 (Czech Republic)	v	(Czech Republic) Kometa Brno	ČEZ Aréna, Plzeň

31 August 2012; 17:30	České Budějovice (Czech Republic)	v	(Austria) Red Bull Salzburg	Budvar Arena, České Budějovice

1 September 2012; 16:30	Eisbären Berlin (Germany)	v	(Germany) Hamburg Freezers	O2 World, Berlin

2 September 2012; 14:30	Hamburg Freezers (Germany)	v	(Germany) Eisbären Berlin	O2 World, Hamburg

4 September 2012; 18:00	Kometa Brno (Czech Republic)	v	(Czech Republic) Plzeň 1929	Kajot Arena, Brno

4 September 2012; 18:30	Oulun Kärpät (Finland)	v	(Germany) Hamburg Freezers	Oulun Energia Areena, Oulu

8 September 2012; 16:00	Hamburg Freezers (Germany)	v	(Sweden) Luleå HF	Eishalle Rostock, Rostock

8 September 2012; 16:30	Eisbären Berlin (Germany)	v	(Finland) Oulun Kärpät	O2 World, Berlin

16 October 2012; 19:15	Red Bull Salzburg (Austria)	v	(Czech Republic) Kometa Brno	Eisarena Salzburg, Salzburg

17 October 2012; 17:30	České Budějovice (Czech Republic)	v	(Czech Republic) Plzeň 1929	Budvar Arena, České Budějovice

23 October 2012; 19:00	Luleå HF (Sweden)	v	(Germany) Eisbären Berlin	Coop Norrbotten Arena, Luleå

27 November 2012; 17:30	Plzeň 1929 (Czech Republic)	v	(Austria) Red Bull Salzburg	ČEZ Aréna, Plzeň

28 November 2012; 18:00	Kometa Brno (Czech Republic)	v	(Czech Republic) České Budějovice	Kajot Arena, Brno

=== South Division ===
Team	GP	W	OTW	OTL	L	GF	GA	+/–	Pts
(Sweden) HV71	8	6	0	1	0	29	12	+17	19
(Austria) Vienna Capitals	7	3	2	1	1	23	20	+3	14
(Czech Republic) Piráti Chomutov	7	2	2	2	1	28	21	+7	12
(Sweden) Linköpings HC	8	3	1	1	3	23	29	–6	12
(Czech Republic) Sparta Praha	8	3	1	0	4	29	34	–5	11
(Slovakia) Slovan Bratislava	8	1	3	1	3	22	21	+1	10
(Finland) JYP	8	2	0	2	4	23	32	–9	8
(Finland) KalPa	8	1	1	2	4	21	29	–8	7

Games in Finland are UTC+3, while all other games are UTC+2, except the November game which is UTC+1.

31 July 2012; 17:30	Piráti Chomutov (Czech Republic)	5–6 GWS (1–2, 0–1, 4–2) (OT: 0–0) (SO: 0–1)	(Slovakia) Slovan Bratislava	Multifunkční aréna Chomutov, Chomutov; Attendance: 3,082

Game reference

Milan Řehoř
Matúš Kostúr
Goalies
Branislav Konrád
Referees:
(Czech Republic) Pavel Hodek
(Czech Republic) Tomáš Turčan
Linesmen:
(Czech Republic) Lukáš Bejček
(Czech Republic) Jiří Rozlílek

D. Hruška (M. Zálešák) (PP) – 02:19	1–0
	1–1	09:19 – M. Bližňák (M. Miklík, I. Švarný)
	1–2	14:42 – M. Bakoš (J. Lipiansky)
	1–3	32:53 – M. Vondrka (J. Boumedienne)
	1–4	41:09 – M. Preisinger (V. Dravecký)
B. Palin (L. Pulpan) – 48:13	2–4
R. Hrabák (Z. Ondřej) – 49:49	3–4
M. Prochazka (D. Hruška) (PP) – 50:47	4–4
	4–5	52:09 – A. Šťastný (P. Ölvecký)
B. Palin (L. Pulpan) (PP) – 53:27	5–5

M. Sikora
N. Gajovský
Shootout
P. Ölvecký
M. Miklík
16 min
Penalties
30 min
31
Shots
38

10 August 2012; 18:00	Slovan Bratislava (Slovakia)	2–1 GWS (1–0, 0–1, 0–0) (OT: 0–0) (SO: 1–0)	(Austria) Vienna Capitals	Slovnaft Arena, Bratislava; Attendance: 6,097

Game reference
Ville Hostikka	Goalies	Matt Zaba; Fabian Weinhandl	Referee: (Slovakia) Vladimír Baluška; Linesmen: (Slovakia) Roman Návratek (Slovakia) Marek Pauljučok
M. Bližňák (M. Miklík, J. Boumedienne) (PP) – 19:05 / 1–0; / 1–1 / 20:22 – J. Fraser			Referee: (Slovakia) Vladimír Baluška; Linesmen: (Slovakia) Roman Návratek (Slovakia) Marek Pauljučok
P. Ölvecký (miss); M. Miklík (miss); M. Vondrka	Shootout	(miss) J. Soares; (miss) A. Lakos; (miss) F. Fortier	Referee: (Slovakia) Vladimír Baluška; Linesmen: (Slovakia) Roman Návratek (Slovakia) Marek Pauljučok
12 min	Penalties	32 min	Referee: (Slovakia) Vladimír Baluška; Linesmen: (Slovakia) Roman Návratek (Slovakia) Marek Pauljučok
36	Shots	24	Referee: (Slovakia) Vladimír Baluška; Linesmen: (Slovakia) Roman Návratek (Slovakia) Marek Pauljučok

14 August 2012; 18:00	Slovan Bratislava (Slovakia)	3–5 (1–1, 1–2, 1–2)	(Czech Republic) Sparta Praha	Slovnaft Arena, Bratislava; Attendance: 8,843

Game reference

Branislav Konrád
Goalies
Marek Schwarz
Referees:
(Slovakia) Vladimír Baluška
(Slovakia) Robert Mullner

R. Kukumberg (M. Kytnár) – 12:16	1–0
	1–1	14:42 – M. Forman (Y. Treille, J. Hanzlik)
	1–2	25:39 – P. Jansky (L. Luňák)
M. Vondrka (J. Boumedienne, M. Miklík) (PP) – 28:13	2–2
	2–3	31:32 – J. Hlinka (P. Ton)
P. Ölvecký (A. Šťastný) – 41:41	3–3
	3–4	51:27 – P. Ton (J. Hanzlik, T. Gawryletz)
	3–5	59:56 – P. Ton (P. Tenkrát, J. Hlinka) (EN)

27 min
Penalties
10 min
48
Shots
30

17 August 2012; 18:30	KalPa (Finland)	1–5 (1–0, 0–3, 0–2)	(Czech Republic) Sparta Praha	Kuopion Jäähalli, Kuopio; Attendance: 3,056

Game reference

Juha Toivonen
Goalies
Marek Schwarz
Referees:
(Finland) Antti Hämäläinen
(Finland) Antti Rönn
Linesmen:
(Finland) Jorma Niskasaari
(Finland) Pauli Savenius

?	1–0
	1–1	?
	1–2	?
	1–3	?
	1–4	?
	1–5	?

4 min
Penalties
12 min
30
Shots
27

17 August 2012; 18:30	JYP (Finland)	4–5 GWS (1–2, 3–2, 0–0) (OT: 0–0) (SO: 0–1)	(Czech Republic) Piráti Chomutov	Synergia-areena, Jyväskylä; Attendance: 2,703

Game reference

Joni Myllykoski
Goalies
Milan Řehoř
Referees:
(Finland) Timo Metsälä
(Finland) Teemu Salminen
Linesmen:
(Finland) Hannu Sormunen
(Finland) Henri Neva

	0–1	?
	0–2	?
?	1–2
?	2–2
	2–3	?
	2–4	?
?	3–4
?	4–4

?
Shootout
?
8 min
Penalties
16 min
38
Shots
33

17 August 2012; 19:00	Linköpings HC (Sweden)	4–2 (1–0, 2–0, 1–2)	(Slovakia) Slovan Bratislava	Cloetta Center, Linköping; Attendance: 3,149

Game reference

Christian Engstrand
Goalies
Branislav Konrád
Referees:
(Sweden) Wolmer Edqvist
(Sweden) Mikael Sjöqvist
Linesmen:
(Sweden) Emil Wernström
(Sweden) Örjan Åhlén

?	1–0
?	2–0
?	3–0
?	4–0
	4–1	?
	4–2	?

16 min
Penalties
14 min
20
Shots
30

17 August 2012; 19:00	HV71 (Sweden)	3–1 (0–1, 2–0, 1–0)	(Austria) Vienna Capitals	Kinnarps Arena, Jönköping; Attendance: 2,767

Game reference

Gustaf Wesslau
Goalies
Matt Zaba
Referees:
(Sweden) Christer Lärking
(Sweden) Morgan Johansson
Linesmen:
(Sweden) Emil Ryd
(Sweden) Tobias Haster

	0–1	?
?	1–1
?	2–1
?	3–1

8 min
Penalties
22 min
27
Shots
26

19 August 2012; 15:00	HV71 (Sweden)	2–0 (1–0, 1–0, 0–0)	(Slovakia) Slovan Bratislava	Kinnarps Arena, Jönköping

19 August 2012; 16:00	Linköpings HC (Sweden)	3–4 GWS (2–2, 1–1, 0–0) (OT: 0–0) (SO: 0–1)	(Austria) Vienna Capitals	Cloetta Center, Linköping

19 August 2012; 17:00	KalPa (Finland)	3–4 GWS (1–1, 1–0, 1–2) (OT: 0–0) (SO: 0–1)	(Czech Republic) Piráti Chomutov	Kuopion Jäähalli, Kuopio

19 August 2012; 18:30	JYP (Finland)	4–5 OT (0–1, 1–2, 3–1) (OT: 0–1)	(Czech Republic) Sparta Praha	Synergia-areena, Jyväskylä

24 August 2012; 18:00	Piráti Chomutov (Czech Republic)	v	(Sweden) Linköpings HC	Multifunkční aréna Chomutov, Chomutov

24 August 2012; 18:00	HC Slovan Bratislava (Slovakia)	5-0 (2-0,0-0,3-0)	(Finland) JYP	Slovnaft Arena, Bratislava

Game reference
Jaroslav Janus	Goalies

24 August 2012; 18:30	Sparta Praha (Czech Republic)	v	(Sweden) HV71	Kalich Arena, Litoměřice

24 August 2012; 19:15	Vienna Capitals (Austria)	v	(Finland) KalPa	Albert Schultz Eishalle, Vienna

26 August 2012; 17:00	Sparta Praha (Czech Republic)	v	(Sweden) Linköpings HC	Kalich Arena, Litoměřice

26 August 2012; 17:30	Piráti Chomutov (Czech Republic)	v	(Sweden) HV71	Multifunkční aréna Chomutov, Chomutov

26 August 2012; 18:00	Slovan Bratislava (Slovakia)	v	(Finland) KalPa	Slovnaft Arena, Bratislava

26 August 2012; 19:15	Vienna Capitals (Austria)	v	(Finland) JYP	Albert Schultz Eishalle, Vienna

30 August 2012; 18:30	JYP (Finland)	v	(Finland) KalPa	Synergia-areena, Jyväskylä

30 August 2012; 19:00	HV71 (Sweden)	v	(Sweden) Linköpings HC	Kinnarps Arena, Jönköping

31 August 2012; 18:30	Sparta Praha (Czech Republic)	v	(Czech Republic) Piráti Chomutov	Tipsport Arena, Prague

31 August 2012; 18:30	KalPa (Finland)	v	(Finland) JYP	Kuopion Jäähalli, Kuopio

31 August 2012; 19:00	Linköpings HC (Sweden)	v	(Sweden) HV71	Stångebro Ishall, Linköping

31 August 2012; 19:15	Vienna Capitals (Austria)	v	(Slovakia) Slovan Bratislava	Albert Schultz Eishalle, Vienna

1 September 2012; 17:30	Piráti Chomutov (Czech Republic)	v	(Czech Republic) Sparta Praha	Multifunkční aréna Chomutov, Chomutov

6 September 2012; 18:30	KalPa (Finland)	v	(Sweden) HV71	Kuopion Jäähalli, Kuopio

7 September 2012; 18:30	JYP (Finland)	v	(Sweden) Linköpings HC	Synergia-areena, Jyväskylä

16 October 2012; 18:30	Sparta Praha (Czech Republic)	v	(Austria) Vienna Capitals	Tipsport Arena, Prague

20 October 2012; 19:00	HV71 (Sweden)	v	(Finland) JYP	Kinnarps Arena, Jönköping

22 October 2012; 19:00	Linköpings HC (Sweden)	v	(Finland) KalPa	Cloetta Center, Linköping

27 November 2012; 19:15	Vienna Capitals (Austria)	v	(Czech Republic) Piráti Chomutov	Albert Schultz Eishalle, Vienna

=== East Division ===
Team	GP	W	OTW	OTL	L	GF	GA	+/–	Pts
(Finland) Tappara	8	4	2	1	1	26	16	+13	17
(Sweden) Brynäs IF	8	5	0	2	1	25	20	+5	17
(Czech Republic) Bílí Tygři Liberec	7	4	0	0	3	23	22	+1	12
(Finland) TPS	8	3	1	1	3	18	17	+1	12
(Czech Republic) Pojišťovna Pardubice	7	3	0	0	4	20	18	+2	9
(Switzerland) SC Bern	7	2	1	1	3	18	22	–4	9
(Sweden) Djurgårdens IF	8	2	1	0	5	18	27	–9	8
(Switzerland) Fribourg-Gottéron	7	1	1	1	4	15	21	–6	6

Games in Finland are UTC+3, while all other games are UTC+2, except the November games which are UTC+1.

14 August 2012; 18:30	Bílí Tygři Liberec (Czech Republic)	5–3 (0–0, 3–2, 2–1)	(Switzerland) Fribourg-Gottéron	Svijanská Aréna, Liberec; Attendance: 1,000

Game reference

Marek Pinc
Goalies
Benjamin Conz
Referees:
(Czech Republic) Michal Hrubý
(Czech Republic) Jan Smítka
Linesmen:
(Czech Republic) Lukáš Kajínek
(Czech Republic) Lukáš Podrazil

T. Urban (P. Nedvěd, L. Derner) (PP) – 21:28	1–0
	1–1	22:08 – G. Mauldin (S. Brügger)
D. Špaček (M. Bárta, P. Nedvěd) – 25:12	2–1
D. Havíř (P. Nedvěd, T. Urban) (PP) – 33:13	3–1
	3–2	35:24 – R. Loeffel (A. Bykov, P. Rosa) (PP)
J. Kudrna – 46:15	4–2
	4–3	55:46 – G. Mauldin (A. Bykov, B. Plüss)
J. Kudrna (P. Nedvěd) (EN) – 60:00	5–3

16 min
Penalties
26 min
34
Shots
25

17 August 2012; 18:30	Tappara (Finland)	4–1 (1–1, 1–0, 2–0)	(Czech Republic) Pojišťovna Pardubice	Svijanská Aréna, Liberec; Attendance: 2,062

Game reference

Pekka Tuokkola
Goalies
Martin Růžička
Referees:
(Finland) Timo Favorin
(Finland) Jari-Pekka Pajula

?	1–0
	1–1	?
?	2–1
?	3–1
?	4–1

12 min
Penalties
14 min
26
Shots
28

17 August 2012; 18:30	TPS (Finland)	5–2 (3–1, 1–1, 1–0)	(Czech Republic) Bílí Tygři Liberec	HK Arena, Turku; Attendance: 2,112

Game reference

Atte Engren
Goalies
Marek Pinc
Tomáš Vošvrda
Referees:
(Finland) Stefan Fonselius
(Finland) Aleksi Rantala
Linesmen:
(Finland) Ville Aalto
(Finland) Joona Elonen

?	1–0
?	2–0
?	3–0
	3–1	?
	3–2	?
?	4–2
?	5–2

8 min
Penalties
16 min
24
Shots
36

17 August 2012; 19:00	Djurgårdens IF (Sweden)	4–1 (2–0, 1–1, 1–0)	(Switzerland) SC Bern	Hovet, Stockholm; Attendance: 2,023

Game reference

Adam Reideborn
Goalies
Marco Bührer
Referees:
(Sweden) Thomas Andersson
(Sweden) Patrik Sjöberg
Linesmen:
(Sweden) Fredrik Altberg
(Sweden) Fredrik Carlman

?	1–0
?	2–0
	2–1	?
?	3–1
?	4–1

14 min
Penalties
62 min
23
Shots
16

17 August 2012; 19:00	Brynäs IF (Sweden)	4–2 (1–0, 2–0, 1–2)	(Switzerland) Fribourg-Gottéron	Läkerol Arena, Gävle; Attendance: 3,138

Game reference

Robin Rahm
Goalies
Simon Rytz
Benjamin Conz

?	1–0
?	2–0
?	3–0
	3–1	?
	3–2	?
?	4–2

8 min
Penalties
12 min
27
Shots
24

18 August 2012; 16:00	Djurgårdens IF (Sweden)	1–0 (0–0, 1–0, 0–0)	(Switzerland) Fribourg-Gottéron	Hovet, Stockholm; Attendance: 1,700

Game reference
Chet Pickard	Goalies	Benjamin Conz	Referees: (Sweden) Linus Öhlund (Sweden) Tobias Björk
? / 1–0			Referees: (Sweden) Linus Öhlund (Sweden) Tobias Björk
8 min	Penalties	8 min	Referees: (Sweden) Linus Öhlund (Sweden) Tobias Björk
19	Shots	32	Referees: (Sweden) Linus Öhlund (Sweden) Tobias Björk

18 August 2012; 17:00	Tappara (Finland)	7–2 (1–1, 4–1, 2–0)	(Czech Republic) Bílí Tygři Liberec	Hakametsä Areena, Tampere; Attendance: 2,595

Game reference

Juha Metsola
Goalies
Marek Pinc
Tomáš Vošvrda
Referees:
(Finland) Hannu Henriksson
(Finland) Jussi Leppänen

?	1–0
	1–1	?
?	2–1
	2–2	?
?	3–2
?	4–2
?	5–2
?	6–2
?	7–2

14 min
Penalties
20 min
31
Shots
30

18 August 2012; 18:00	Brynäs IF (Sweden)	3–4 GWS (1–0, 0–0, 2–3) (OT: 0–0) (SO: 0–1)	(Switzerland) SC Bern	Läkerol Arena, Gävle; Attendance: 2,873

Game reference

Daniel Hansen
Goalies
Marco Bührer
Referees:
(Sweden) Wolmer Edqvist
(Sweden) Mikael Sjöqvist

?	1–0
?	2–0
?	3–0
	3–1	?
	3–2	?
	3–3	?

?
Shootout
?
10 min
Penalties
10 min
28
Shots
34

19 August 2012; 17:00	TPS (Finland)	2–4 (1–0, 0–1, 1–3)	(Czech Republic) Pojišťovna Pardubice	HK Arena, Turku; Attendance: 2,276

24 August 2012; 18:00	Pojišťovna Pardubice (Czech Republic)	6-2 (0-1, 4-1, 2-0)	(Sweden) Brynäs IF	ČEZ Aréna, Pardubice; Attendance: 2,854

24 August 2012; 18:30	Bílí Tygři Liberec (Czech Republic)	6-2 (1-1, 5-0, 0-1)	(Sweden) Djurgårdens IF	Tipsport Arena, Liberec; Attendance: 1,573

24 August 2012; 18:30	SC Bern (Switzerland)	1-4 (1-1, 0-2, 0-1)	(Finland) TPS	PostFinance-Arena, Bern; Attendance: 1,137

24 August 2012; 19:45	Fribourg-Gottéron (Switzerland)	2–3 GWS (0–0, 1-1, 1–1) (OT: 0–0) (SO: 0–1)	(Finland) Tappara	BCF Arena, Fribourg; Attendance: 1,111

25 August 2012; 17:00	Bílí Tygři Liberec (Czech Republic)	1-2 (1-1, 0-0, 0-1)	(Sweden) Brynäs IF	Tipsport Arena, Liberec; Attendance: 1,471

25 August 2012; 17:30	Fribourg-Gottéron (Switzerland)	2-1 (0–1, 0-0, 1–0) (OT: 1–0)	(Finland) TPS	BCF Arena, Fribourg; Attendance: 1,227

25 August 2012; 18:00	Pojišťovna Pardubice (Czech Republic)	5-1 (3-0, 1-1, 1-0)	(Sweden) Djurgårdens IF	ČEZ Aréna, Pardubice; Attendance: 2,436

25 August 2012; 18:30	SC Bern (Switzerland)	3-4 (2–1, 1-0, 0–2) (OT: 0–1)	(Finland) Tappara	PostFinance-Arena, Bern; Attendance: 2,074

30 August 2012; 19:00	Djurgårdens IF (Sweden)	5-4 (0–1, 2-1, 2–2) (OT: 0–0) (SO: 1–0	(Sweden) Brynäs IF	Hovet, Stockholm; Attendance: 2,486

31 August 2012; 18:00	Pojišťovna Pardubice (Czech Republic)	0-3 (0-0, 0-0, 0-3)	(Czech Republic) Bílí Tygři Liberec	ČEZ Aréna, Pardubice; Attendance: 1,273

31 August 2012; 18:30	TPS (Finland)	0-1 (0–0, 0-1, 0–0)	(Finland) Tappara	HK Arena, Turku; Attendance: 2,838

31 August 2012; 19:45	Fribourg-Gottéron (Switzerland)	4-3 (1-1, 0-1, 3-1)	(Switzerland) SC Bern	BCF Arena, Fribourg; Attendance: 1,534

1 September 2012; 16:00	Brynäs IF (Sweden)	3-0 (1-0, 1-0, 1-0)	(Sweden) Djurgårdens IF	Läkerol Arena, Gävle; Attendance: 3,001

1 September 2012; 17:00	Tappara (Finland)	1-2 (0–1, 0-0, 1–0) (OT: 0–1)	(Finland) TPS	Hakametsä Areena, Tampere; Attendance: 2,963

1 September 2012; 19:45	SC Bern (Switzerland)	4-2 (1-1, 0-1, 3-0)	(Switzerland) Fribourg-Gottéron	PostFinance-Arena, Bern; Attendance: 1,725

4 September 2012; 19:00	Brynäs IF (Sweden)	4-1 (1-0, 1-1, 2-0)	(Finland) TPS	Läkerol Arena, Gävle; Attendance: 2,057

5 September 2012; 18:30	Bílí Tygři Liberec (Czech Republic)	4-3 (2-1, 2-1, 0-1)	(Czech Republic) Pojišťovna Pardubice	Tipsport Arena, Liberec; Attendance: 1,682

6 September 2012; 19:00	Djurgårdens IF (Sweden)	3-5 (1-0, 1-4, 1-1)	(Finland) Tappara	Hovet, Stockholm; Attendance: 1,047

15 October 2012; 18:30	TPS (Finland)	3-2 (0-1, 2-1, 1-0)	(Sweden) Djurgårdens IF	HK Arena, Turku; Attendance: 2,204

15 October 2012; 18:30	Tappara (Finland)	1-3 (1-0, 0-3, 0-0)	(Sweden) Brynäs IF	Hakametsä Areena, Tampere; Attendance: 2,080

16 October 2012; 18:00	Pojišťovna Pardubice (Czech Republic)	1-2 (1-0, 0-2, 0-0)	(Switzerland) SC Bern	ČEZ Aréna, Pardubice; Attendance: 1,275

12 November 2012; 19:45	Fribourg-Gottéron (Switzerland)	v	(Czech Republic) Pojišťovna Pardubice	BCF Arena, Fribourg

13 November 2012; 19:45	SC Bern (Switzerland)	v	(Czech Republic) Bílí Tygři Liberec	PostFinance-Arena, Bern

=== Playoff team seeds ===
Playoff hosts Slovan Bratislava and Vienna Capitals qualify automatically. Four division-winners qualify. After this, best-scoring division-runners-up qualify to bring the number to exactly eight.

Winners of divisions:

- West: Färjestad BK
- North: Luleå HF
- South: HV71
- East: Tappara

Runners-up of divisions:

Team	Division	GP	W	OTW	OTL	L	GF	GA	+/–	Pts
(Germany) Eisbären Berlin	North	8	6	0	1	1	27	15	+12	19
(Sweden) Brynäs IF	East	8	5	0	2	1	25	20	+5	17
(Switzerland) EV Zug	West	8	4	2	0	2	30	21	+9	16
(Austria) Vienna Capitals	South	8	3	2	1	2	24	26	-2	14

== Playoffs ==
The playoffs, known as the Red Bulls Salute, will take place in the Albert Schultz Eishalle, Vienna and in the Slovnaft Arena, Bratislava between 13 and 16 December 2012, with the Final game taking place in Slovnaft Arena. It will be played as a single-elimination tournament, meaning that the losing teams in each round are eliminated from the tournament. For the first time in Red Bulls Salute history, no classification/placement games will be played, so there will only be Quarterfinals, Semifinals as well as the Final game. The winner of the Red Bulls Salute will be awarded a total prize sum of €50 000, and the losing finalist receives €10 000.

Albert Schultz Eishalle Capacity: 7 000	Slovnaft Arena Capacity: 10 115
2012 European Trophy is located in Austria	2012 European Trophy is located in Slovakia
Austria – Vienna	Slovakia – Bratislava

=== Bracket ===
The non-home teams will be seeded according to their score in the regulation round.

Quarterfinals
#1	(Sweden) Luleå HF	4
#6	(Sweden) Brynäs IF	3
(Austria) Vienna Capitals	3
#3	(Germany) Eisbären Berlin	2
#2	(Sweden) HV71	1
#5	(Finland) Tappara	2
(Slovakia) Slovan Bratislava	1
#4	(Sweden) Färjestad BK	4

Semifinals
QF1	(Sweden) Luleå HF	2
QF2	(Austria) Vienna Capitals	0
QF3	(Finland) Tappara	1
QF4	(Sweden) Färjestad BK	3

Finals
SF1	(Sweden) Luleå HF	2
SF2	(Sweden) Färjestad BK	0

=== Quarterfinals ===
All times are local (UTC+1).

13 December 2012; 17:00	Luleå HF (Sweden)	4–3	(Sweden) Brynäs IF	Albert Schultz Eishalle, Vienna

13 December 2012; 17:00	HV71 (Sweden)	1–2; 1–0, 0–1, 0–1	(Finland) Tappara	Slovnaft Arena, Bratislava

Fasth / Goals / Erkinjutti Pallola

13 December 2012; 20:30	Vienna Capitals (Austria)	3–2 OT	(Germany) Eisbären Berlin	Albert Schultz Eishalle, Vienna

13 December 2012; 20:30	Slovan Bratislava (Slovakia)	1–4	(Sweden) Färjestad BK	Slovnaft Arena, Bratislava

The quarterfinal matchups will be determined by the regulation-round record of the six playoff teams aside from the two automatically qualified hosts Slovan Bratislava and Vienna Capitals. The top-ranked team of these six teams will face the sixth-ranked team; the second-ranked team will face the fifth-ranked team; the third-ranked team will face Vienna Capitals; and the fourth-ranked team will face Slovan Bratislava.

=== Semifinals ===
All times are local (UTC+1).

15 December 2012; 17:00	Luleå HF (Sweden)	2–0	(Austria) Vienna Capitals	Albert Schultz Eishalle, Vienna

15 December 2012; 20:30	Tappara (Finland)	1–3	(Sweden) Färjestad BK	Slovnaft Arena, Bratislava

For quarterfinal numbering, see the bracket above.

=== Final ===
Time is local (UTC+1).

16 December 2012; 20:00	Luleå HF (Sweden)	2–0 (1–0, 0–0, 1–0)	(Sweden) Färjestad BK	Slovnaft Arena, Bratislava; Attendance: 1,750

Game reference
David Rautio	Goalies	Fredrik Pettersson-Wentzel	Referee: Baluska; Korba; Stano
J. Vihko (L. Persson, J. Fransson) - 11:15 / 1–0; J. Vihko (D. Rautio) - 53:05 / 2–0			Referee: Baluska; Korba; Stano

== Ranking and statistics ==
=== Final standings ===
The following is the final standings of the playoffs. However, note that because there weren't any classification/placement games in this year's playoffs, the standings for the six teams that missed the Final game were ranked on the following criteria: A. whether the team made it to the Semifinal or not, and B. the team's regulation round record.

Gold medal	(Sweden) Luleå HF
Silver medal	(Sweden) Färjestad BK
3	(Finland) Tappara
4	(Austria) Vienna Capitals
5	(Slovakia) Slovan Bratislava
6	(Germany) Eisbären Berlin
7	(Sweden) HV71
8	(Sweden) Brynäs IF

=== Scoring leaders ===
List shows the top skaters sorted by points, then goals. If the list exceeds 10 skaters because of a tie in points, all of the tied skaters are shown.

Player	Team	GP	G	A	Pts	PIM	POS
(Canada) Matt Foy	Eisbären Berlin	2	3	2	5	0	F
(Finland) Antti Erkinjuntti	Tappara	2	2	3	5	2	F
(Czech Republic) David Hruška	Piráti Chomutov	3	2	3	5	6	F
(Sweden) Niklas Olausson	Luleå HF	2	1	4	5	2	F
(Canada) Cam Abbott	Luleå HF	2	3	1	4	25	F
(Czech Republic) Tomáš Urban	Bílí Tygři Liberec	3	3	1	4	4	F
(Czech Republic) Milan Kraft	Piráti Chomutov	3	3	1	4	2	F
(Canada) Jason Lepine	JYP	2	2	2	4	0	D
(Germany) Jerome Flaake	Hamburg Freezers	2	2	2	4	4	F
(Finland) Toni Kähkönen	Oulun Kärpät	2	2	2	4	0	F

GP = Games played; G = Goals; A = Assists; Pts = Points; PIM = Penalties in minutes; POS = Position
positions: F = Forward; D = Defenceman
Sources: Europeantrophy.com and Eurohockey.com
Updated as of 19 August 2012.

=== Leading goaltenders ===
Only the top five goaltenders, based on save percentage, who have played 40% of their team's minutes, are included in this list.

Player	Team	TOI	SA	GA	GAA	Sv%	SO
(Canada) Chet Pickard	Djurgårdens IF	60:00	32	0	0.00	100.00	1
(Finland) Joni Ortio	HIFK	60:00	30	0	0.00	100.00	1
(Slovakia) Július Hudáček	Frölunda Indians	60:00	29	0	0.00	100.00	1
(Sweden) Viktor Kokman	HV71	60:00	27	0	0.00	100.00	1
(Finland) Tomi Karhunen	Oulun Kärpät	60:46	44	1	0.99	97.73	0

TOI = Time on ice (minutes:seconds); SA = Shots against; GA = Goals against; GAA = Goals against average; Sv% = Save percentage; SO = Shutouts
Sources: Europeantrophy.com and Eurohockey.com
Updated as of 19 August 2012.

=== European Star Award leaders ===
The European Star Award is a three stars award given to the three best players in each game. The first star gets three points, the second gets two points, and the third gets one point. List shows the top ten players based on the number of European Star Award points.

Player	Team	GP	Pts	POS
(Canada) Matt Foy	Eisbären Berlin	2	5	F
(Canada) Cam Abbott	Luleå HF	2	3	F
(United States) Jack Connolly	Färjestad BK	2	3	F
(United States) Chris Connolly	Tappara	2	3	F
(Canada) Chet Pickard	Djurgårdens IF	1	3	G
(United States) Rhett Rakhshani	HV71	1	3	F
(Canada) Ryan Glenn	Red Bull Salzburg	2	3	D
(Canada) Jason Lepine	JYP	2	3	D
(Canada) Byron Ritchie	SC Bern	2	3	F
(Finland) Ari Vallin	Sparta Praha	1	3	D

GP = Games played; Pts = Points; POS = Position
positions: G = Goaltender; F = Forward; D = Defenceman
Source: Europeantrophy.com
Updated as of 19 August 2012.
