= 2006 IIHF European Champions Cup =

Tournament details
- Host country: Russia
- Venue: 1 (in 1 host city)
- Dates: January 5 – January 8
- Teams: 6

Final positions
- Champions: (Russia) HC Dynamo Moscow (1st title)
- Runners-up: (Finland) Kärpät

Tournament statistics
- Games played: 7
- Goals scored: 35 (5 per game)
- Attendance: 34,300 (4,900 per game)
- Scoring leader(s): (Belarus) Mikhail Grabovski, (Russia) Maxim Sushinsky (8 points)

Awards
- MVP: (Russia) Maxim Sushinsky

The 2006 IIHF European Champions Cup was the second edition of IIHF European Champions Cup. It was held in Saint Petersburg at the Ice Palace arena, from January 5 to January 8. The champions of 2005 of the six strongest hockey nations of Europe participate: HC Dynamo Moscow (RUS), Frölunda HC (SWE), HC Slovan Bratislava (SVK), Kärpät (FIN), HC Moeller Pardubice (CZE), HC Davos (SUI).

== Group A ==
- Ivan Hlinka Division

=== Results ===
All times local (CET/UTC +1)

January 5, 2006; 14:30	Kärpät (Finland)	3–1 (1–0, 0–1, 2–0)	(Switzerland) HC Davos	Ice Palace; Attendance: 2,500

M. Lehtonen 15:56; M. Broš 48:51; M. Broš 58:08 / Goals / B. Christen 27:15

January 6, 2006; 15:00	HC Davos (Switzerland)	6–2 (2–0, 2–1, 2–1)	(Sweden) Frölunda HC	Ice Palace; Attendance: 2,500

L. Wilson 12:12; L. Wilson (16:55); J. Marha 21:16; B. Hauer 27:49; J. von Arx 43:00; R. von Arx 47:51 / Goals / J. Oduya 23:27; T. Kallio 52:24

January 7, 2006; 15:00	Kärpät (Finland)	3–0 (1–0, 1–0, 1–0)	(Sweden) Frölunda HC	Ice Palace; Attendance: 2,500

T. Jaakola 9:39; J. Viuhkola 22:48; M. Pyörälä 59:39 / Goals

=== Standings ===
Pos	Team	Pld	W	OTW	OTL	L	GF	GA	GD	Pts
1	(Finland) Kärpät	2	2	0	0	0	6	1	+5	6
2	(Switzerland) HC Davos	2	1	0	0	1	7	5	+2	3
3	(Sweden) Frölunda HC	2	0	0	0	2	2	9	−7	0

Source: IIHF

== Group B ==
- Alexander Ragulin Division

=== Results ===
All times local (CET/UTC +1)

January 5, 2006; 18:30	HC Dynamo Moscow (Russia)	3–1 (2–0, 0–0, 1–1)	(Slovakia) HC Slovan Bratislava	Ice Palace; Attendance: 7,400

A. Vishniakov 4:50; M. Grabovski 10:22; M. Grabovski 48:42 / Goals / P. Klouda 57:12

January 6, 2006; 18:30	HC Moeller Pardubice (Czech Republic)	2–0 (0–0, 2–0, 0–0)	(Slovakia) HC Slovan Bratislava	Ice Palace; Attendance: 1,000

T. Rolinek 29:19; P. Sýkora 39:32 / Goals

January 7, 2006; 18:30	HC Dynamo Moscow (Russia)	5–1 (3–1, 0–0, 2–0)	(Czech Republic) HC Moeller Pardubice	Ice Palace; Attendance: 7,900

M. Grabovski 1:14; M. Sushinsky 4:02; A. Vishniakov 12:34; S. Vyshedkevich 54:25; D. Kulyash 57:35 / Goals / D. Havíř 8:35

=== Standings ===
Pos	Team	Pld	W	OTW	OTL	L	GF	GA	GD	Pts
1	(Russia) HC Dynamo Moscow	2	2	0	0	0	8	2	+6	6
2	(Czech Republic) HC Moeller Pardubice	2	1	0	0	1	3	5	−2	3
3	(Slovakia) HC Slovan Bratislava	2	0	0	0	2	1	5	−4	0

Source: IIHF

== Gold medal game ==
January 8, 2006; 18:30	HC Dynamo Moscow (Russia)	5 – 4 (1–0, 1–2, 2–2) (OT: 0–0) (GWS: 2–1)	(Finland) Kärpät	Ice Palace; Attendance: 10,500

A. Kharitonov 11:57; M. Sushinsky 36:44; M. Grabovski 44:33; L. Kanareikin 46:42 / Goals / K. Sahlstedt 26:41; J.-P. Haataja 39:58; M. Pyörälä 56:18; V. Ujčík 57:35

2006 IIHF European Champions Cup Winners
(Russia)
HC Dynamo Moscow
First title
