= 2019–20 HockeyAllsvenskan season =

- League: HockeyAllsvenskan
- Sport: Ice hockey
- Duration: September 2019 – March 2020 (regular season)
- Number of teams: 14
- Total attendance: 948,589
- Average attendance: 2,606
- TV partner(s): C More
- First place: IF Björklöven
- Top scorer: Jonathan Johnson (Modo)

HockeyAllsvenskan seasons
- ← 2018–19 2020–21 →

The 2019–20 HockeyAllsvenskan season was the 15th season that the second tier of Swedish ice hockey has operated under that name. The series consisted of 14 teams playing a regular season in which each team played each other team four times, twice at home and twice away. This was followed by a series of promotion and relegation tournaments, with the teams finishing first through eight participating in promotion playoffs, and the teams finishing 13th and 14th forced to requalify to avoid relegation to the Hockeyettan. However, after the regular season, on 15 March 2020 the Swedish Ice Hockey Association (SIHA) cancelled the post-season due to the COVID-19 pandemic in Sweden. No teams will be promoted nor relegated to or from HockeyAllsvenskan, and the next season of HockeyAllsvenskan will feature the same teams.

Björklöven won the regular season with a record-setting 121 points, beating the previous record of 109 points.

== Participating teams ==
HockeyAllsvenskan team map

Team	City	Arena	Capacity
AIK	Stockholm	Hovet	8,094
Almtuna IS	Uppsala	Gränby Ishall	2,800
IF Björklöven	Umeå	A3 Arena	5,400
BIK Karlskoga	Karlskoga	Nobelhallen	6,300
Karlskrona HK	Karlskrona	NKT Arena Karlskrona	5,050
Kristianstads IK	Kristianstad	Kristianstads ishall	2,300
Modo Hockey	Örnsköldsvik	Fjällräven Center	7,600
Mora IK	Mora	Jalas Arena	4,500
Södertälje SK	Södertälje	Axa Sports Center	6,200
Timrå IK	Timrå	NHK Arena	6,000
Tingsryds AIF	Tingsryd	Nelson Garden Arena	3,400
HC Vita Hästen	Norrköping	Himmelstalundshallen	4,280
Västerviks IK	Västervik	Plivit Trade-hallen	2,500
Västerås IK	Västerås	ABB Arena Nord	4,902

== Regular season ==
=== Standings ===
Pos	Team	Pld	W	OTW	OTL	L	GF	GA	GD	Pts	Qualification or relegation
1	IF Björklöven	52	36	5	3	8	179	94	+85	121	Advance to the HockeyAllsvenskan finals
2	Modo Hockey	52	35	1	4	12	205	130	+75	111	Advance to the HockeyAllsvenskan finals
3	Timrå IK	52	29	8	4	11	178	116	+62	107	Advance to the HockeyAllsvenskan playoffs
4	BIK Karlskoga	52	28	4	6	14	191	144	+47	98	Advance to the HockeyAllsvenskan playoffs
5	Västerås IK	52	22	5	8	17	150	142	+8	84	Advance to the HockeyAllsvenskan playoffs
6	HC Vita Hästen	52	20	8	5	19	145	131	+14	81	Advance to the HockeyAllsvenskan playoffs
7	Södertälje SK	52	19	9	6	18	155	150	+5	81	Advance to the HockeyAllsvenskan playoffs
8	Västerviks IK	52	16	7	6	23	121	151	−30	68	Advance to the HockeyAllsvenskan playoffs
9	Mora IK	52	14	8	6	24	130	166	−36	64	
10	Tingsryds AIF	52	12	10	6	24	128	156	−28	62	
11	Karlskrona HK	52	14	6	6	26	116	158	−42	60	
12	Almtuna IS	52	13	6	8	25	126	163	−37	59	
13	Kristianstads IK	52	13	5	6	28	128	166	−38	55	Advance to the HockeyAllsvenskan qualifiers
14	AIK	52	10	1	9	32	97	182	−85	41	Advance to the HockeyAllsvenskan qualifiers

Updated to match(es) played on 6 March 2020. Source:

=== Statistics ===
==== Scoring leaders ====
The following shows the top ten players who led the league in points, at the conclusion of matches played on 6 March 2020. If two or more skaters are tied (i.e. same number of points, goals and played games), all of the tied skaters are shown.

Player	Team	GP	G	A	Pts	+/–	PIM
(Sweden) Jonathan Johnson	Modo Hockey	52	29	50	79	+28	32
(Sweden) Jonathan Dahlén	Timrå IK	51	36	41	77	+29	42
(Sweden) Patrik Karlkvist	Modo Hockey	52	30	38	68	+25	24
(Sweden) Albin Lundin	Timrå IK	52	26	42	68	+26	28
(Canada) Adam Tambellini	Modo Hockey	37	28	35	63	+25	51
(Sweden) Fredrik Forsberg	BIK Karlskoga	52	32	21	53	+7	12
(Sweden) Tor Immo	BIK Karlskoga	51	26	27	53	+13	38
(Denmark) Nick Olesen	Södertälje SK	50	28	23	51	+14	68
(Sweden) Ludwig Blomstrand	Södertälje SK	49	28	22	50	+15	36
(Canada) Alex Hutchings	IF Björklöven	51	19	28	47	+20	50

==== Leading goaltenders ====
The following shows the top ten goaltenders who led the league in goals against average, provided that they have played at least 40% of their team's minutes, at the conclusion of matches played on 6 March 2020.

Player	Team	GP	TOI	W	T	L	GA	SO	Sv%	GAA
(United States) Joe Cannata	IF Björklöven	41	2478:41	33	0	8	71	6	93.81	1.72
(Sweden) Victor Brattström	Timrå IK	45	2707:00	33	0	12	96	3	91.41	2.13
(Sweden) Viktor Kokman	HC Vita Hästen	37	2199:44	19	0	18	87	4	89.80	2.37
(Sweden) Arvid Söderblom	Tingsryds AIF	32	1865:03	16	0	14	74	2	92.41	2.38
(Sweden) Erik Hanses	Modo Hockey	25	1378:23	16	0	6	55	2	90.60	2.39
(Sweden) Jesper Myrenberg	Västerås IK	29	1647:30	17	0	12	66	1	91.92	2.40
(Canada) Tanner Jaillet	Karlskrona HK	29	1665:58	12	0	15	67	3	91.40	2.41
(Sweden) Tim Juel	BIK Karlskoga	30	1742:09	19	0	10	73	2	91.48	2.51
(Sweden) Linus Lundin	Modo Hockey	25	1369:29	16	0	8	59	3	90.34	2.58
(Sweden) Alexander Sahlin	Södertälje SK	30	1743:06	16	0	13	79	0	90.99	2.72

== Post-season ==
=== Finals ===
The top two teams from the regular season met in a best-of-five tournament, with the winner advancing directly to the SHL qualifiers, and the losing team forced to play an additional playoff.

==== IF Björklöven vs. Modo Hockey ====
10 March	IF Björklöven	3–4	2OT	Modo Hockey	A3 Arena	Recap
Fredric Andersson 1 – pp – 3:08; Alexander Wiklund 1 – pp – 10:28		First period		No scoring
Olle Liss 1 – pp – 8:22		Second period		3:45 – pp – Henrik Björklund 1; 12:35 – Adam Tambellini 1
No scoring		Third period		9:57 – Mattias Norlinder 1
No scoring		Second overtime period		14:28 – Magnus Häggström 1
Joe Cannata 35 saves / 39 shots		Goalie stats		Patrik Bartošák 54 saves / 57 shots

12 March	Modo Hockey	0–3	IF Björklöven	Fjällräven Center	Recap
No scoring		First period	No scoring
No scoring		Second period	3:40 – Fredric Weigel 1; 17:57 – pp – Tyler Vesel 1
No scoring		Third period	15:14 – Alex Hutchings 1
Patrik Bartošák 39 saves / 42 shots		Goalie stats	Joe Cannata 33 saves / 33 shots

=== HockeyAllsvenskan playoffs ===
Teams 3–8 from the regular season played a single round-robin tournament, with teams 3–5 getting home-ice advantage. The season would then be over for all but the winning team, which would advance to meet the loser of the HockeyAllsvenskan finals in a playoff to the SHL qualifiers. Teams also started with bonus points based on their position in the regular season standings. Team 3 began with three points, team 4 with two points, and team 5 with one point.

Pos	Team	Pld	W	OTW	OTL	L	GF	GA	GD	Pts	Qualification
1	Timrå IK	1	1	0	0	0	8	3	+5	6	Advance to Playoff to the SHL qualifiers
2	Västerås IK	1	1	0	0	0	5	2	+3	4	Return to HockeyAllsvenskan for the 2020–21 season
3	Södertälje SK	1	1	0	0	0	8	6	+2	3	Return to HockeyAllsvenskan for the 2020–21 season
4	BIK Karlskoga	1	0	0	0	1	3	8	−5	2	Return to HockeyAllsvenskan for the 2020–21 season
5	Västerviks IK	1	0	0	0	1	6	8	−2	0	Return to HockeyAllsvenskan for the 2020–21 season
6	HC Vita Hästen	1	0	0	0	1	2	5	−3	0	Return to HockeyAllsvenskan for the 2020–21 season

Updated to match(es) played on 11 March 2020. Source:

=== Playoff to the SHL qualifiers ===
In the playoff to the SHL qualifiers (Swedish: Play Off inför direktkval till SHL), the losing team from the HockeyAllsvenskan finals would meet the winning team from the HockeyAllsvenskan playoffs in a best-of-three series. The winning team would advance to the SHL qualifiers.

=== SHL qualifiers ===
Two teams from the HockeyAllsvenskan and two teams from the SHL would play a best-of-seven series, with the winner qualifying for play in the 2020–21 SHL season. The winner of the HockeyAllsvenskan finals would meet team 14 from the SHL, while the winner of the playoff to the SHL qualifiers would meet team 13 from the SHL.

=== HockeyAllsvenskan qualifiers ===
Teams 13 and 14 from the regular season would defend their spots in HockeyAllsvenskan in the HockeyAllsvenskan qualifiers (Swedish: Kval till HockeyAllsvenskan) against the four best teams from Hockeyettan.
