= Milan Řehoř =

Milan Řehoř may refer to:

- Milan Řehoř (canoeist)
- Milan Řehoř (ice hockey)
