= Řehenice =

- Municipality
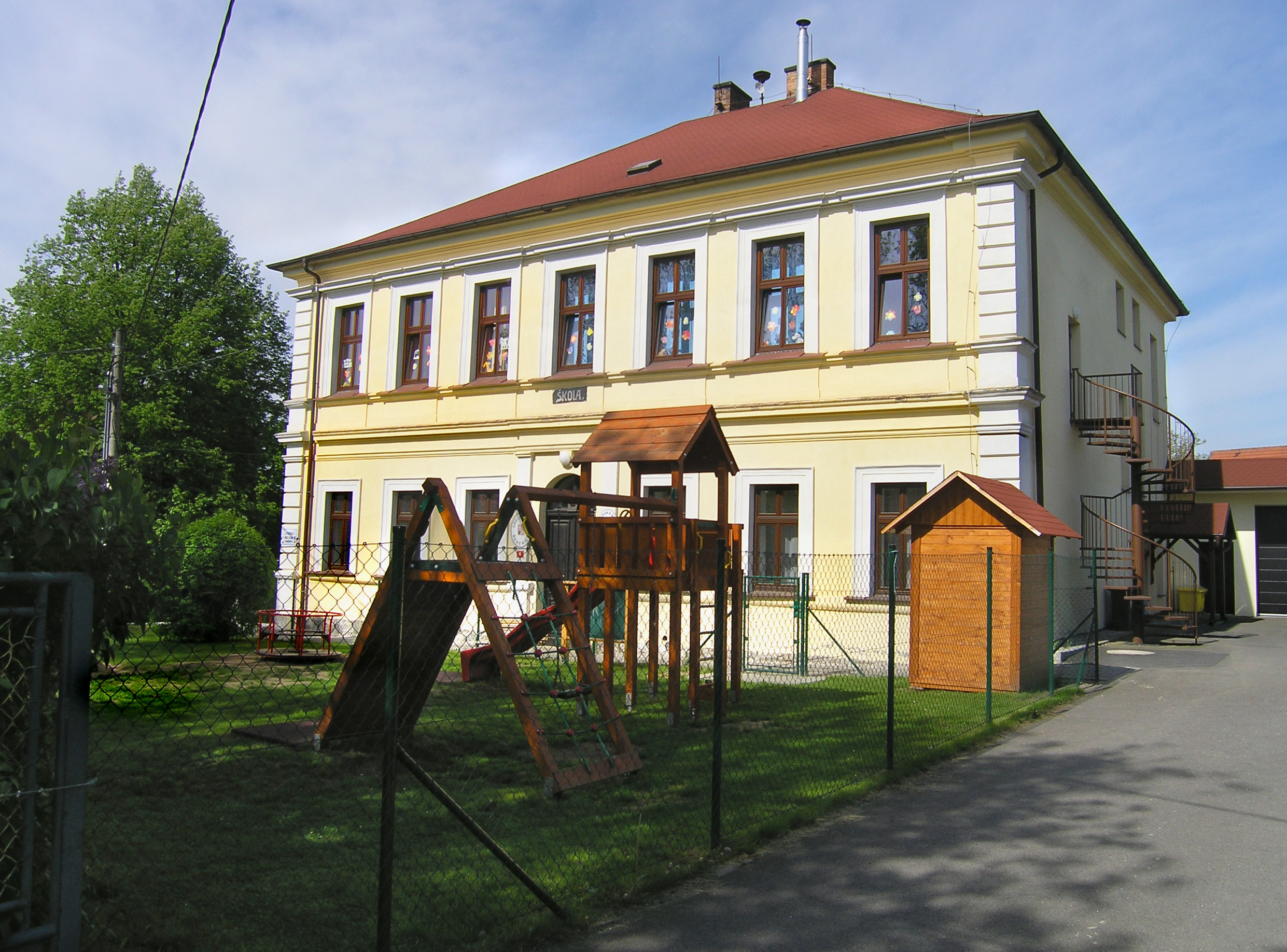
- Municipal office and kindergarten

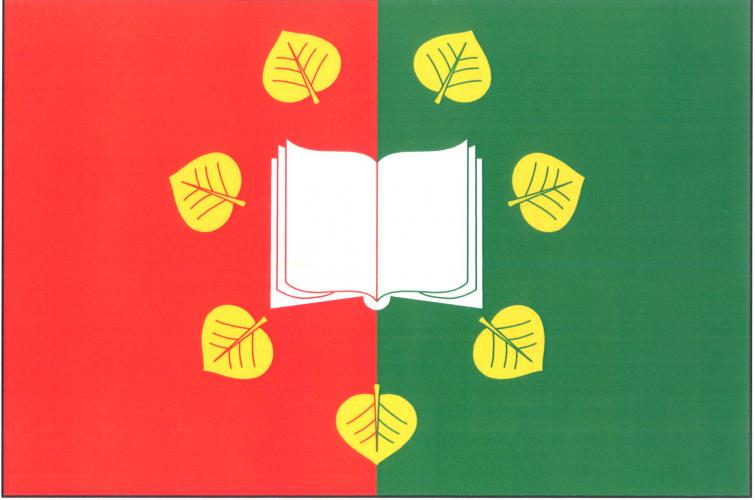
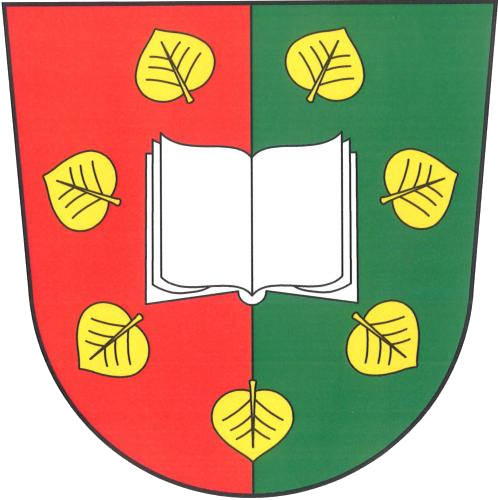
- Flag Coat of arms

- Location in the Czech Republic
- Coordinates: 49°52′11″N 14°39′1″E
- Country: Czech Republic
- Region: Central Bohemian
- District: Benešov
- First mentioned: 1384

Area
  - Total: 11.04 km^{2} (4.26 sq mi)
- Elevation: 321 m (1,053 ft)

Population (2026-01-01)
  - Total: 572
  - Density: 51.8/km^{2} (134/sq mi)
- Time zone: UTC+1 (CET)
  - Summer (DST): UTC+2 (CEST)
- Postal codes: 251 67, 251 68
- Website: www.rehenice.cz

Řehenice is a municipality and village in Benešov District in the Central Bohemian Region of the Czech Republic. It has about 600 inhabitants.

== Administrative division ==
Řehenice consists of seven municipal parts (in brackets population according to the 2021 census):

- Řehenice (85)
- Babice (244)
- Barochov (88)
- Gabrhele (4)
- Křiváček (44)
- Malešín (36)
- Vavřetice (36)

== Etymology ==
The name is derived from the personal name Řehen (which is probably a variant of Řehoř), meaning "the village of Řehen's people".

== Geography ==
Řehenice is located about 10 kilometres (6 mi) north of Benešov and 21 km (13 mi) southeast of Prague. It lies in the Benešov Uplands. The highest point is at 508 m (1,667 ft) above sea level. The Sázava River flows along the southern municipal border, just outside the municipality.

== History ==
The first written mention of Řehenice is from 1384.

== Demographics ==
Historical population

Year	Pop.	±%
1869	833	—
1880	735	−11.8%
1890	720	−2.0%
1900	737	+2.4%
1910	720	−2.3%

Year	Pop.	±%
1921	687	−4.6%
1930	580	−15.6%
1950	474	−18.3%
1961	407	−14.1%
1970	371	−8.8%

Year	Pop.	±%
1980	351	−5.4%
1991	264	−24.8%
2001	288	+9.1%
2011	424	+47.2%
2021	537	+26.7%

Source: Censuses

== Transport ==
There are no railways or major roads passing through the municipality.

== Sights ==
There are no significant monuments in Řehenice. Among the protected cultural monuments in the municipality are a former inn from the end of the 18th century, located in Křiváček, and terrain remains of the Božešice Fortress (today an archaeological site), which stood here in the 13th–15th centuries.
