= Jaroslav Vlach =

Czech ice hockey player

- Vlach in 2026
- Born: April 6, 1992 (age 34) Paběnice, Czechoslovakia
- Height: 6 ft 2 in (188 cm)
- Weight: 223 lb (101 kg; 15 st 13 lb)
- Position: Forward
- Shoots: Left
- ELH team: HC Bílí Tygři Liberec
- NHL draft: Undrafted
- Playing career: 2011–present

Jaroslav Vlach (born April 6, 1992) is a Czech professional ice hockey player. He is currently playing with the HC Bílí Tygři Liberec of the Czech Extraliga (ELH).

Vlach made his Czech Extraliga debut playing with HC Bílí Tygři Liberec during the 2012–13 Czech Extraliga season.
