= Řehoř =

Rehor or Řehoř is a Czech given name equivalent to "Gregory", as well as a surname.

As a given name it has a number of diminutive forms and surnames derived from it: Řehořek (cs:Řehořek, feminine: Řehořková), Řehák, Řehá/Reha.

Notable people with the surname include:

- Fred Rehor (1893–1959), American football player
- Grete Rehor (1910–1987), Austrian politician
- Milan Řehoř (canoeist), Czechoslovak slalom canoeist
- Milan Řehoř (ice hockey) (born 1984), Czech ice hockey goaltender
