= Rzehak =

Rzehak is a surname of Czech origin, a German transliteration of the Czech surname Řehák. Notable people with the surname include:

- Anton Rzehak (1855–1923), Moravian geologist, paleontologist and prehistorian
- Peter Rzehak (born 1970), Austrian alpine skier
