= Zdeněk Ondřej =

Czech ice hockey player

- Born: 2 August 1980 (age 46) Jindřichův Hradec, Czechoslovakia
- Height: 5 ft 11 in (180 cm)
- Weight: 209 lb (95 kg; 14 st 13 lb)
- Position: Forward
- Shot: Left
- Played for: HC České Budějovice; HC Znojemští Orli; HC Pardubice; HC Vítkovice; HC Bílí Tygři Liberec; Piráti Chomutov
- NHL draft: Undrafted
- Playing career: 2000–2020

Zdeněk Ondřej (born 2 August 1980) is a Czech former professional ice hockey forward who played with HC Bílí Tygři Liberec in the Czech Extraliga (ELH).

== Career ==
Ondřej began his career with his hometown club in Jindřichův Hradec, where he scored 24 goals and 45 points in 36 games in the 1999–2000 season. 9–20 season. He then moved to North America and played two seasons in the West Coast Hockey League with the Long Beach Ice Dogs, Idaho Steelheads and Anchorage Aces between 2000 and 2002. Returning home in 2002, he played in the Czech Extraliga for HC České Budějovice, HC Znojemští Orli, HC Pardubice, HC Vítkovice and HC Bílí Tygři Liberec, with whom he spent two seasons from 2009 to 2011. His most productive Extraliga season was 2005–06 with Znojmo, when he recorded 23 points (11 goals and 12 assists) in 49 games. After a brief spell with Piráti Chomutov in 2012–13, he finished his playing career with HC Vajgar Jindřichův Hradec in the 2019–20 season.
