= Victor Brattström =

Swedish ice hockey player (born 1997)

- Born: 22 March 1997 (age 29) Gothenburg, Sweden
- Height: 6 ft 4 in (193 cm)
- Weight: 201 lb (91 kg; 14 st 5 lb)
- Position: Goaltender
- Catches: Left
- Allsv team Former teams: AIK; Timrå IK; KooKoo; HV71; Färjestad BK
- NHL draft: 160th overall, 2018; Detroit Red Wings
- Playing career: 2018–present

Victor Brattström (born 22 March 1997) is a Swedish professional ice hockey player currently playing for AIK of the HockeyAllsvenskan (Allsv). He was drafted 160th overall by the Red Wings in the 2018 NHL entry draft.

== Playing career ==
During the 2017–18 season, Brattström appeared in 15 games for Timrå IK of the HockeyAllsvenskan, where he posted a 10–5 record, with three shutouts, a 1.93 goals against average (GAA) and .918 save percentage. Timrå IK was promoted to the Swedish Hockey League for the 2018–19 season.

On 20 April 2018, Brattström signed a one-year contract with Timrå IK. On 22 September 2018, Brattström made his professional debut for Timrå IK, where he allowed three goals on 33 shots in a 2–3 overtime loss to Skellefteå AIK.

As Timrå IK was relegated to the Allsvenskan following a single season in the SHL, Brattström emerged as the club's starting goaltender for the 2019–20 season, appearing in 45 of 52 regular-season games. He collected 33 wins, finishing second among league goaltenders with a 2.13 goals against average and sixth with a .914 save percentage.

With Timrå IK resigning to continue in the Allsvenskan due to COVID-19, Brattström left to sign a one-year contract with Finnish top-flight club, KooKoo of the Liiga on 23 March 2020. On 29 March 2020, Brattström was also signed to a two-year, entry-level contract with draft club, the Detroit Red Wings.

After his contract with the Red Wings and as a pending restricted free agent, Brattström opted to return to Sweden in signing a one-year contract with HV71 of the SHL on 13 June 2023.

== Career statistics ==
			Regular season									Playoffs
Season	Team	League	GP	W	L	OTL	MIN	GA	SO	GAA	SV%	GP	W	L	MIN	GA	SO	GAA	SV%
2015–16	Frölunda HC	J20	27	18	9	0	1539	58	4	2.26	.918	3	2	0	—	—	0	2.93	.883
2016–17	Timrå IK	J20	31	18	11	0	1778	68	2	2.29	.935	4	2	2	—	—	1	2.03	.929
2017–18	Timrå IK	J20	2	0	2	0	125	5	0	2.40	.921	—	—	—	—	—	—	—	—
2017–18	Timrå IK	Allsv	15	10	5	0	901	29	3	1.93	.918	—	—	—	—	—	—	—	—
2018–19	Timrå IK	SHL	23	5	14	0	1131	53	0	2.81	.897	—	—	—	—	—	—	—	—
2019–20	Timrå IK	Allsv	45	33	12	0	2707	96	3	2.13	.914	—	—	—	—	—	—	—	—
2020–21	KooKoo	Liiga	38	18	12	7	2213	81	1	2.20	.903	1	0	1	60	4	0	4.00	.780
2021–22	Grand Rapids Griffins	AHL	32	11	16	3	1808	100	1	3.32	.894	—	—	—	—	—	—	—	—
2021–22	Toledo Walleye	ECHL	3	2	1	0	183	13	0	4.25	.829	—	—	—	—	—	—	—	—
2022–23	Grand Rapids Griffins	AHL	18	4	8	3	988	61	0	3.71	.885	—	—	—	—	—	—	—	—
2022–23	Toledo Walleye	ECHL	1	0	0	1	67	3	0	2.70	.893	—	—	—	—	—	—	—	—
2023–24	HV71	SHL	3	1	2	0	178	14	0	4.73	.829	—	—	—	—	—	—	—	—
2023–24	IF Björklöven	Allsv	2	1	1	0	123	7	0	3.41	.825	—	—	—	—	—	—	—	—
2023–24	Färjestad BK	SHL	5	2	3	0	298	10	1	2.01	.907	—	—	—	—	—	—	—	—
2023–24	BIK Karlskoga	Allsv	5	3	1	0	258	7	1	1.63	.927	3	2	1	217	7	0	1.93	.920
2024–25	AIK	Allsv	23	18	5	0	1357	43	4	1.90	.927	15	8	7	890	43	0	2.90	.898
2025–26	AIK	Allsv	30	15	13	0	1646	71	1	2.59	.903	3	0	3	184	12	0	3.92	.865
SHL totals			31	8	19	0	1,607	77	1	2.88	.891	—	—	—	—	—	—	—	—
Liiga totals			38	18	12	7	2,213	81	1	2.20	.903	1	0	1	60	4	0	4.00	.780
