= Rehak =

Řehák (feminine: Řeháková) is a Czech surname. Rehák (feminine: Reháková) is a Slovak surname. They are derived from the given name Řehoř, the Czech form of Gregory. Rehak is an Anglicized and Germanized form of the name. Notable people with the surname include:

== Řehák ==
- Anna Řeháková (1850–1937), Czech teacher, translator and travel writer
- Dagmar Lerchová (born Řeháková, 1930–2017), Czech figure skater
- Eliška Řeháková (1846–1916), Czech translator, journalist and suffragist
- Liliana Řeháková (1958–2008), Czech ice dancer
- Martin Řehák (1933–2010), Czech athlete
- Pavel Řehák (born 1963), Czech footballer
- Viera Řeháková (born 1964), Czech ice dancer

== Rehák ==
- Daniel Rehák (born 1985), Slovak footballer
- Rudolf Rehák (born 1965), Slovak footballer

== Rehak ==
- Dagmar Rehak (born 1956), German swimmer
- Daniel Rehak (born 2000), Hungarian COD champion
- Frank Rehak (1926–1987), American musician
- Gonzalo Rehak (born 1984), Argentine football player
- Jeremie Rehak (born 1988), American Major League Baseball umpire
- Paul Rehak (1954–2004), American archaeologist
- Theo Rehak (born 1947), American graphic designer
- Thomas Rehak (born 1971), Liechtensteiner politician
