= Ondřej Vitásek =

Czech ice hockey player (born 1990)

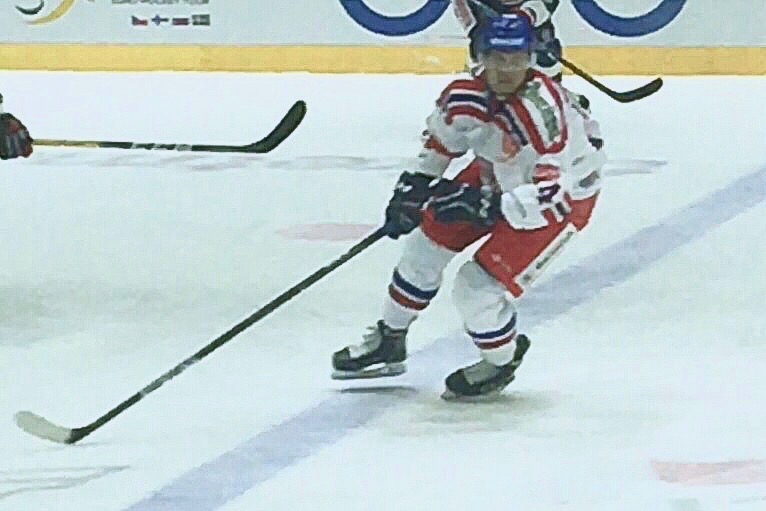
- Born: September 4, 1990 (age 36) Prostějov, Czechoslovakia
- Height: 6 ft 4 in (193 cm)
- Weight: 214 lb (97 kg; 15 st 4 lb)
- Position: Defence
- Shot: Right
- Played for: HC Vitkovice; HC Bílí Tygři Liberec; HC Yugra; Kunlun Red Star; Amur Khabarovsk; Dinamo Riga
- National team: Czech Republic
- NHL draft: Undrafted
- Playing career: 2009–2023

Ondřej Vitásek (born September 4, 1990) is a Czech former professional ice hockey defenseman who most notably played in the Czech Extraliga (ELH) and Kontinental Hockey League (KHL).

== Playing career ==
Vitásek made his Czech Extraliga debut playing with HC Vitkovice during the 2009–10 Czech Extraliga season.

In the 2018–19 season, having joined Chinese club Kunlun Red Star of the KHL on a one-year deal, Vitásek compiled a career-high 13 assists and 16 points from the blueline in 43 regular season games.

On 1 May 2019, Vitásek opted to continue in the KHL, signing on the opening day of free agency to a two-year contract with Russian outfit, Amur Khabarovsk. In the following 2019–20 season, Vitásek contributed with 5 goals and 12 points in 55 regular season games, unable to help propel Amur to the post-season.

On 15 July 2020, Vitásek's remaining year of his contract was mutually terminated with Amur Khabarovsk, releasing him to free agency. He was later signed to a one-year contract to continue in the KHL with Latvian-based club, Dinamo Riga, on 12 August 2020.

On 26 December 2020, Vitásek signed a contract with Bílí Tygři Liberec until 30 April 2023 with one-year option.

On 16 October 2022, Vitásek had tested positive for cocaine and was suspended by Anti-Doping Committee of the Czech Republic for two years. After 2022–23 season the club terminated contract with Vitásek.

== Career statistics ==
=== Regular season and playoffs ===
			Regular season					Playoffs
Season	Team	League	GP	G	A	Pts	PIM	GP	G	A	Pts	PIM
2005–06	HC Minor 2000 Přerov	CZE U18	12	0	0	0	2	—	—	—	—	—
2005–06	HK Jestřábi Prostějov	CZE.2 U18	25	2	3	5	20	—	—	—	—	—
2006–07	HC Zubr Přerov	CZE.2 U18	24	1	1	2	36	—	—	—	—	—
2006–07	HK Jestřábi Prostějov	CZE.2 U20	9	0	1	1	6	—	—	—	—	—
2007–08	HC Slezan Opava	Czech20	45	1	2	3	30	2	0	0	0	27
2008–09	HC Slezan Opava	Czech20	41	3	16	19	62	3	1	0	1	0
2008–09	HC Slezan Opava	Czech.2	17	0	1	1	12	6	0	1	1	0
2009–10	HC Slezan Opava	Czech20	30	4	22	26	55	—	—	—	—	—
2009–10	HC Slezan Opava	Czech.2	33	4	7	11	72	3	0	0	0	2
2009–10	HC Vítkovice Steel	ELH	1	0	0	0	0	—	—	—	—	—
2010–11	HC Slezan Opava	Czech20	28	2	7	9	81	—	—	—	—	—
2010–11	HC Slezan Opava	Czech.2	12	0	1	1	18	—	—	—	—	—
2011–12	Bílí Tygři Liberec	ELH	3	0	1	1	4	—	—	—	—	—
2011–12	HC Benátky nad Jizerou	Czech.1	41	2	8	10	22	6	0	1	1	4
2012–13	Bílí Tygři Liberec	ELH	13	0	1	1	4	—	—	—	—	—
2012–13	HC Benátky nad Jizerou	Czech.1	26	2	4	6	14	—	—	—	—	—
2013–14	Bílí Tygři Liberec	ELH	31	0	5	5	20	3	0	0	0	4
2013–14	HC Benátky nad Jizerou	Czech.1	26	1	6	7	24	—	—	—	—	—
2014–15	Bílí Tygři Liberec	ELH	45	5	5	10	38	—	—	—	—	—
2014–15	HC Benátky nad Jizerou	Czech.1	1	0	0	0	2	—	—	—	—	—
2015–16	Bílí Tygři Liberec	ELH	38	1	2	3	26	14	1	1	2	8
2015–16	HC Benátky nad Jizerou	Czech.1	4	0	1	1	6	—	—	—	—	—
2016–17	Bílí Tygři Liberec	ELH	49	5	9	14	44	12	0	3	3	20
2017–18	HC Yugra	KHL	43	2	2	4	15	—	—	—	—	—
2018–19	Kunlun Red Star	KHL	43	3	13	16	20	—	—	—	—	—
2019–20	Amur Khabarovsk	KHL	55	5	7	12	48	—	—	—	—	—
2020–21	Dinamo Riga	KHL	19	1	4	5	16	—	—	—	—	—
2020–21	Bílí Tygři Liberec	ELH	24	1	4	5	22	16	2	2	4	10
2021–22	Bílí Tygři Liberec	ELH	21	2	1	3	8	—	—	—	—	—
2022–23	Bílí Tygři Liberec	ELH	14	1	1	2	4	—	—	—	—	—
ELH totals			239	15	29	44	170	45	3	6	9	42
KHL totals			160	11	26	37	99	—	—	—	—	—

=== International ===
Year	Team	Event	Result	GP	G	A	Pts	PIM
2014	Czech Republic	WC	4th	10	0	1	1	6
2018	Czech Republic	OG	4th	2	0	0	0	0
2021	Czech Republic	WC	7th	1	0	0	0	2
Senior totals				13	0	1	1	8
