= Michal Bárta (ice hockey) =

Czech ice hockey player

- Born: October 27, 1987 (age 37) Hradec Králové, Czechoslovakia
- Height: 5 ft 11 in (180 cm)
- Weight: 179 lb (81 kg; 12 st 11 lb)
- Position: Right wing
- Shoots: Right
- Czech 2. liga team Former teams: HC Kobra Praha; HC Bílí Tygři Liberec; BK Mladá Boleslav; HC Dynamo Pardubice; MsHK Žilina; Cracovia Krakow
- Playing career: 2007–present

Michal Bárta (born October 27, 1987) is a Czech professional ice hockey right winger for HC Kobra Praha of the Czech 2. liga.

Bárta previously played 318 games in the Czech Extraliga for HC Bílí Tygři Liberec, BK Mladá Boleslav and HC Dynamo Pardubice.
