= Tomáš Urban (ice hockey) =

Czech ice hockey player

- Born: 22 June 1985 (age 40) Ostrava, Czechoslovakia
- Height: 6 ft 8 in (203 cm)
- Weight: 214 lb (97 kg; 15 st 4 lb)
- Position: Forward
- Shoots: Left
- Chance liga team Former teams: HC Slovan Ústečtí Lvi; HC RT Torax Poruba; HC Benátky nad Jizerou; HC Bílí Tygři Liberec; BK Mladá Boleslav; HC Nové Zámky; KS Cracovia; Vlci Žilina; MHk 32 Liptovský Mikuláš
- NHL draft: Undrafted
- Playing career: 2007–present

Tomáš Urban (born 22 June 1985) is a Czech professional ice hockey forward playing for HC Slovan Ústečtí Lvi of the Chance liga.

== Career ==
Urban made his Czech Extraliga debut playing with HC Bílí Tygři Liberec during the 2009–10 Czech Extraliga season. Previously played for HC Sareza Ostrava, HC VOKD Poruba, HC Benátky nad Jizerou and HC Bílí Tygři Liberec.

== Career statistics ==
=== Regular season and playoffs ===
			Regular season					Playoffs
Season	Team	League	GP	G	A	Pts	PIM	GP	G	A	Pts	PIM
