= Jason Lepine =

Canadian ice hockey player

- Born: March 26, 1985 (age 39); Cornwall, Ontario, Canada
- Height: 5 ft 10 in (178 cm)
- Weight: 185 lb (84 kg; 13 st 3 lb)
- Position: Defence
- Shot: Right
- Played for: Corpus Christi Rayz; Knoxville Ice Bears; Bloomington PrairieThunder; Rockford IceHogs; Peoria Rivermen; Albany River Rats; Bakersfield Condors; Toledo Walleye; Grand Rapids Griffins; Houston Aeros; HC Kladno; JYP-Akatemia; JyP HT Jyvaskyla; Iserlohn Roosters; HC ’05 Banská Bystrica; Cornwall River Kings; HC Fassa
- NHL draft: Undrafted
- Playing career: 2006–2017

Jason Lepine (born March 26, 1985) is a Canadian professional ice hockey defenceman.

Lepine played junior hockey for his hometown Cornwall Colts of the CCHL.

Lepine signed with the Corpus Christi Rayz of the Central Hockey League (CHL) for the 2006–07 season to commence his professional career. In 2007–08 he won a Southern Professional Hockey League (SPHL) championship with the Knoxville Ice Bears.
