= Mika Norja =

Finnish ice hockey player

- Born: 25 December 1984 (age 41) Lohja, Finland
- Height: 6 ft 2 in (188 cm)
- Weight: 203 lb (92 kg; 14 st 7 lb)
- Position: Goaltender
- Catches: Left
- Mestis team Former teams: Jukurit; SM-liiga; HIFK
- Playing career: 2005–present

Mika Norja (born 25 December 1984) is a Finnish professional ice hockey goaltender currently playing for Jukurit in the Finish Mestis.

== Career ==
He started his pro career in the 2. Divisioona with Ankat before moving on to play for Ketterä in the Suomi-sarja league. Mika played in this league until 2009-10 when he moved to RoKi in the Finnish Mestis.

In 2011-12 he signed with HIFK of the SM-liiga and played a total of 18 SM-liiga games over 2 seasons. He was loaned out to several teams during his time with HIFK.

In 2013-14 he signed with Timrå IK in the HockeyAllsvenskan.

== Career stats ==
updated 20 November 2013

Year	Team	League	GP	GAA	SV%
2005–06	Ankat	2. Divisioona	18	4.20	.893
2006–07	Ankat	2. Divisioona	7	3.00	.917
	Ketterä	Suomi-sarja	8	5.28	.883
2007–08	Ketterä	Suomi-sarja	28	3.96	.897
2008–09	Ketterä	Suomi-sarja	34	2.96	.911
2009–10	RoKi	Mestis	12	3.89	.850
	Kiekko-Laser	Suomi-sarja	9	2.78	.910
2010–11	Kiekko-Vantaa	Mestis	37	2.58	.922
2011–12	HIFK	SM-liiga	7	1.70	.944
	Kiekko-Vantaa (on loan)	Mestis	12	2.72	.913
	KooKoo (on loan)	Mestis	4	1.97	.941
2012–13	HIFK	SM-liiga	11	2.65	.905
	HCK (on loan)	Mestis	8	2.94	.918
	KooKoo (on loan)	Mestis	1	4.00	.902
2013–14	Timrå IK	HockeyAllsvenskan	11	1.59	.941
