= Grete Rehor =

Austrian politician (1910–1987)

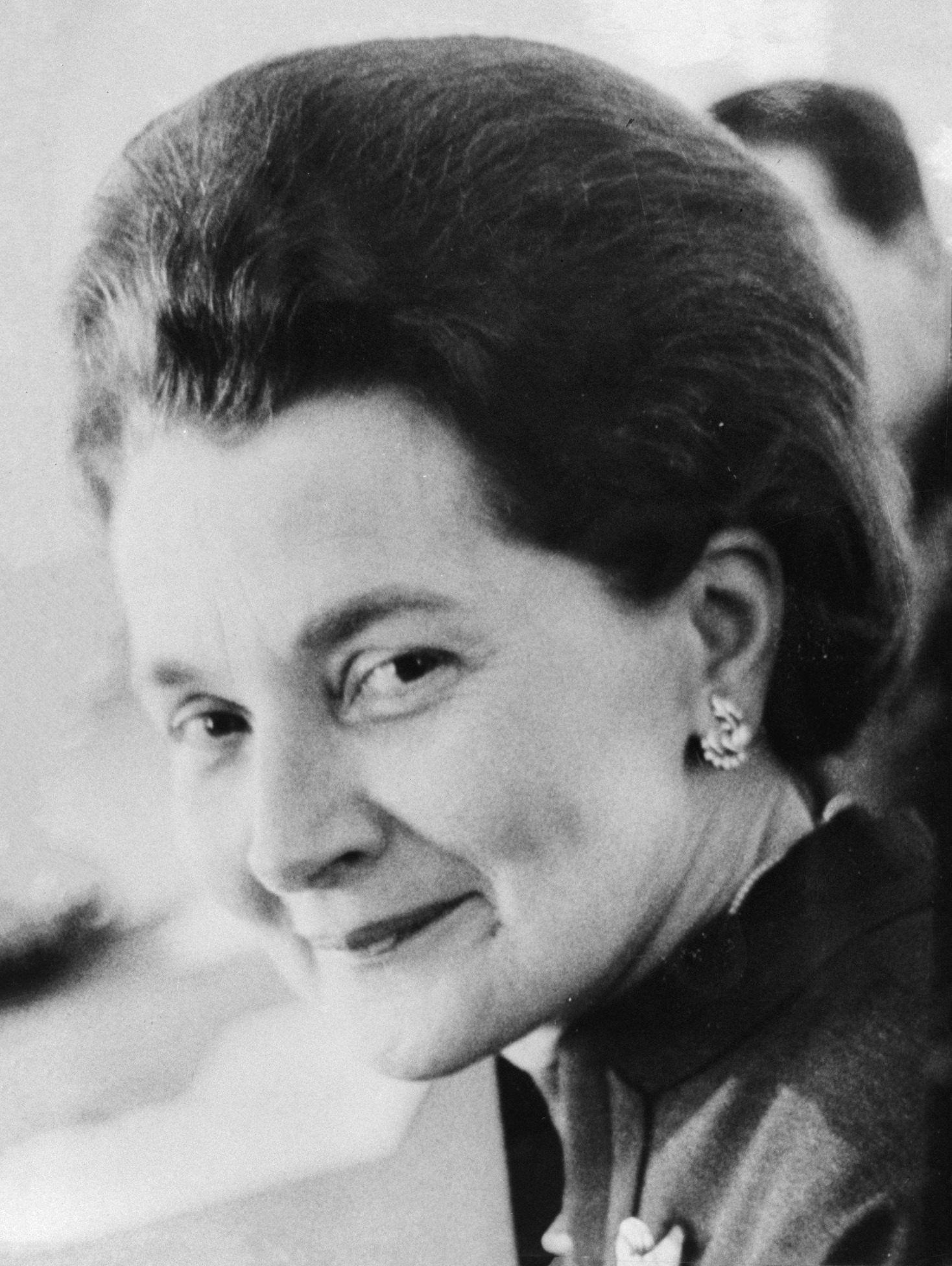
Grete Rehor in 1966

Grete Rehor (30 June 1910 in Vienna – 28 January 1987), was an Austrian politician belonging to the Austrian People's Party. She was Minister of Social Affairs from 1966 to 1970, and was the first female government minister in Austria.

== Sources ==
- Anton Burghardt (Hrsg.): Soziale Sicherheit und politische Verantwortung. Festschrift für Grete Rehor Verein für Sozial- und Wirtschaftspolitik, Wien 1975.
