= Jan von Arx =

Swiss ice hockey player

- Born: February 9, 1978 (age 47) Thun, Switzerland
- Height: 5 ft 8 in (173 cm)
- Weight: 163 lb (74 kg; 11 st 9 lb)
- Position: Defence
- Played for: SC Langnau; SC Herisau; HC Davos
- National team: Switzerland
- Playing career: 1994–2015

Jan von Arx (born February 9, 1978) is a Swiss former professional ice hockey player who last played for HC Davos. He is the younger brother of Reto von Arx.

He also played for SC Herisau and SC Langnau.

== Stats ==
			Season					Playoffs				
Season	Team	Liga	GP	G	A	Pts	PIM	GP	G	A	Pts	PIM
1994/95	SC Langnau	NLB	6	0	0	0	2	5	0	1	1	2
1995/96	HC Davos	NLA	4	0	0	0	0					
1996/97	HC Davos	NLA	36	0	1	1	16	4	0	0	0	0
1996/97	SC Herisau	NLB	4	0	0	0	0					
1997/98	HC Davos	NLA	37	2	2	4	14	18	0	1	1	14
1998/99	HC Davos	NLA	43	6	6	12	14	6	0	0	0	6
1999/00	HC Davos	NLA	44	1	3	4	41	5	0	0	0	2
2000/01	HC Davos	NLA	43	7	13	20	46	4	1	0	1	6
2001/02	HC Davos	NLA	33	2	1	3	26	16	0	3	3	10
2002/03	HC Davos	NLA	40	1	10	11	63	16	1	1	2	6
2003/04	HC Davos	NLA	45	0	12	12	36	6	0	0	0	2
2004/05	HC Davos	NLA	42	5	2	7	46	15	0	1	1	12
2005/06	HC Davos	NLA	42	1	6	7	64	15	0	1	1	6
2006/07	HC Davos	NLA	23	2	3	5	24	19	2	3	5	14
2007/08	HC Davos	NLA	49	4	9	13	34	13	0	3	3	2
2008/09	HC Davos	NLA	50	3	10	13	18	20	1	1	2	10
2009/10	HC Davos	NLA	39	4	7	11	28	6	0	0	0	4
2010/11	HC Davos	NLA	48	1	12	12	20	14	0	2	2	12
2011/12	HC Davos	NLA	47	2	8	10	20	4	0	1	1	2
2012/13	HC Davos	NLA	20	0	2	2	22					
2013/14	HC Davos	NLA	47	1	5	6	10	6	0	0	0	0
2014/15	HC Davos	NLA	42	0	4	4	20	14	0	2	2	4
NLA			774	42	115	157	562	185	5	18	23	100

(GP = Games played; G = Goals; A = Assists; Pts = Points; PIM = Penalty minutes)
