= Milan Procházka =

Czech ice hockey player

- Born: April 7, 1977 (age 49) Znojmo, Czechoslovakia
- Height: 6 ft 0 in (183 cm)
- Weight: 201 lb (91 kg; 14 st 5 lb)
- Position: Forward
- Shoots: Left
- WSM Liga team: HC Zubr Přerov
- Playing career: 1996–present

Milan Procházka (born April 7, 1977) is a Czech professional ice hockey player. He played with HC Zubr Přerov in the WSM Liga during the 2010–11 Czech Extraliga season.
