= Daniel Špaček =

Czech ice hockey player

- Born: January 9, 1986 (age 40) Liberec, Czechoslovakia
- Height: 5 ft 11 in (180 cm)
- Weight: 187 lb (85 kg; 13 st 5 lb)
- Position: Forward
- Shoots: Right
- Czech.3 team Former teams: HC Gepardi Jablonec; HK Nitra; HC Bílí Tygři Liberec
- Playing career: 2006–present

Daniel Špaček (born January 9, 1986) is a Czech professional ice hockey player who currently plays with HC Gepardi Jablonec in the lower Czech professional leagues. He most notably played with HC Bílí Tygři Liberec in the Czech Extraliga. Špaček previously played with HK Nitra in the Slovak Extraliga, and also in the Czech lower leagues with KLH Jindřichův Hradec, HC Vrchlabí, and HC Benátky nad Jizerou.
