= Lukáš Luňák =

Czech ice hockey player

- Born: May 3, 1989 (age 35)
- Height: 5 ft 10 in (178 cm)
- Weight: 165 lb (75 kg; 11 st 11 lb)
- Position: Forward
- Shoots: Left
- Czech Extraliga team: HC Kladno
- Playing career: 2010–present

Lukáš Luňák (born May 3, 1989) is a Czech professional ice hockey player. He played with HC Kladno in the Czech Extraliga during the 2010–11 Czech Extraliga season.
