= David Havíř =

Czech ice hockey player

- Born: April 18, 1975 (age 51) Brno, Czechoslovakia
- Height: 5 ft 10 in (178 cm)
- Weight: 190 lb (86 kg; 13 st 8 lb)
- Position: Defence
- Shot: Left
- Played for: HC Kometa Brno; HC Znojemští Orli; HC Pardubice; HC Karlovy Vary; HC Plzeň; HC Bílí Tygři Liberec
- National team: Czech Republic
- Playing career: 1995–2016

David Havíř (born April 18, 1975) is a Czech former professional ice hockey defenceman.

He played 726 games in the Czech Extraliga with HC Kometa Brno, HC Znojemští Orli, HC Pardubice, HC Karlovy Vary, HC Plzeň and HC Bílí Tygři Liberec.

== Career statistics ==
			Regular season					Playoffs
Season	Team	League	GP	G	A	Pts	PIM	GP	G	A	Pts	PIM
1992–93	HC Brno	Czech2	—	1	2	3	—	—	—	—	—	—
1993–94	TJ Přerov	Czech2	—	2	2	4	—	—	—	—	—	—
1993–94	HC Královopolská Brno	Czech2	9	2	0	2	0	1	0	0	0	2
1994–95	HC Hodonín	Czech2	46	5	13	18	—	—	—	—	—	—
1995–96	HC Kometa Brno	Czech	27	0	5	5	24	—	—	—	—	—
1996–97	HC Kometa Brno	Czech2	10	1	0	1	—	—	—	—	—	—
1997–98	Jets de Viry-Essonne	France	28	5	12	17	84	—	—	—	—	—
1998–99	HC Znojemští Orli	Czech2	52	7	11	18	69	—	—	—	—	—
1999–00	HC Znojemští Orli	Czech	49	8	5	13	30	—	—	—	—	—
2000–01	HC Znojemští Orli	Czech	52	6	16	22	44	7	0	3	3	6
2001–02	HC Znojemští Orli	Czech	52	14	19	33	44	6	1	3	4	6
2002–03	HC Znojemští Orli	Czech	51	5	6	11	49	6	0	2	2	12
2003–04	HC Znojemští Orli	Czech	52	9	20	29	59	7	1	3	4	8
2004–05	HC Pardubice	Czech	43	2	9	11	36	16	0	5	5	10
2005–06	HC Pardubice	Czech	51	5	4	9	42	—	—	—	—	—
2006–07	HC Pardubice	Czech	52	7	6	13	70	18	2	0	2	28
2007–08	HC Pardubice	Czech	44	5	8	13	70	—	—	—	—	—
2008–09	HC Pardubice	Czech	52	2	9	11	52	7	1	1	2	2
2009–10	HC Pardubice	Czech	52	0	9	9	20	13	2	1	3	14
2010–11	HC Energie Karlovy Vary	Czech	1	0	0	0	0	—	—	—	—	—
2010–11	KLH Chomutov	Czech2	43	2	15	17	59	13	2	4	6	12
2011–12	HC Pardubice	Czech	8	1	2	3	6	7	0	3	3	8
2011–12	HC Plzeň 1929	Czech	5	0	2	2	4	—	—	—	—	—
2011–12	Piráti Chomutov	Czech2	37	0	9	9	20	8	1	2	3	6
2012–13	Bílí Tygři Liberec	Czech	19	0	4	4	10	—	—	—	—	—
2012–13	HC Plzeň	Czech	13	2	0	2	6	4	0	1	1	0
2013–14	VSK Technika Brno	Czech3	43	6	18	24	48	3	0	0	0	0
2014–15	VSK Technika Brno	Czech3	38	4	26	30	49	3	0	1	1	4
2015–16	HC Technika Brno	Czech3	38	7	13	20	41	8	0	3	3	2
Czech totals			623	66	124	190	600	91	7	22	29	96
