= Joonas Huovinen =

Finnish ice hockey player

- Born: February 23, 1994 (age 31) Oulu, Finland
- Height: 5 ft 9 in (175 cm)
- Weight: 176 lb (80 kg; 12 st 8 lb)
- Position: Forward
- Shoots: Right
- Erste Liga team Former teams: Dunaújvárosi Acélbikák; Oulun Kärpät; Ässät
- NHL draft: Undrafted
- Playing career: 2012–present

Joonas Huovinen (born February 23, 1994) is a Finnish professional ice hockey player. He is currently playing for Dunaújvárosi Acélbikák in the Erste Liga.

Huovinen made his Liiga debut playing with Oulun Kärpät during the 2012–13 Liiga season.
