= Daniel Rehák =

Slovak footballer

Personal information
- Full name: Daniel Rehák
- Date of birth: 2 April 1985 (age 41)
- Place of birth: Czechoslovakia
- Height: 1.86 m (6 ft 1 in)
- Position: Defender

Team information
- Current team: FK Slovan Duslo Šaľa
- Number: 12

Youth career
- 1993–2003: Duslo Šaľa

Senior career*
Years	Team	Apps	(Gls)
2003–2006	Duslo Šaľa	31	(1)
2006–2010	Slovan Liberec	1	(0)
2007–2008	→ České Budějovice (loan)	0	(0)
2010–2012	Fotbal Třinec	47	(1)
2012–	Duslo Šaľa	0	(0)

International career^{‡}
- Slovakia U-21
- * Club domestic league appearances and goals as of 21 July 2012 ‡ National team caps and goals as of 31 May 2012

Daniel Rehák (born 2 April 1985 in Slovakia) is a Slovak defender who currently plays for FK Slovan Duslo Šaľa. He is a former Slovakia U-21 international.

He came through the ranks of FK Slovan Duslo Šaľa of the Slovak 2nd Division and caught the eye of top Czech club Slovan Liberec with his impressive performances. They signed the 21-year-old international in 2006. After finding it hard to establish himself in the first team and making only 1 substitute appearance in the league he went on loan to České Budějovice. However, he spent his loan spell on the bench and playing for the 'B' side before returning to Liberec. He was released by the club in 2010 and joined FK Fotbal Třinec to get first team football.
