= Joonas Vihko =

Finnish ice hockey player (born 1981)

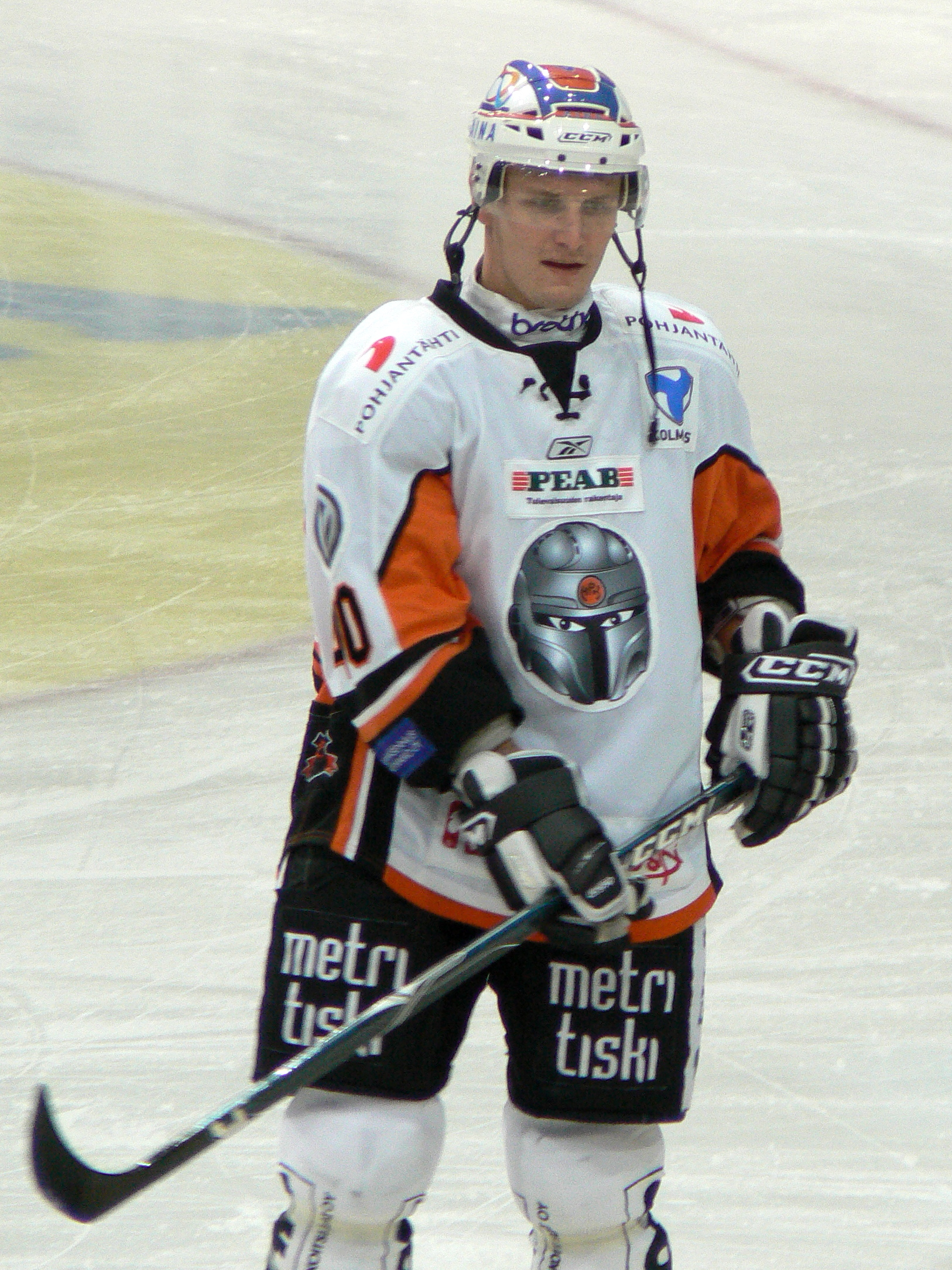
- Born: April 6, 1981 (age 45) Helsinki, Finland
- Height: 5 ft 9 in (175 cm)
- Weight: 176 lb (80 kg; 12 st 8 lb)
- Position: Left wing
- Shot: Right
- Played for: HIFK; SaiPa; HPK; Luleå HF; Ilves; Vaasan Sport; Tölzer Löwen
- NHL draft: 103rd overall, 2002; Mighty Ducks of Anaheim
- Playing career: 2001–2018

Joonas Vihko (born April 6, 1981) is a Finnish former professional ice hockey winger.

Vihko began his career with Kiekko-Vantaa before moving to his hometown team HIFK in 1998. Having played in U18 and U20 level he eventually made his way up to the senior team. In 2004-05 he was loaned out to HC Salamat and in 2005-06 he moved to SaiPa for a brief tenure. He then signed with HPK and after four seasons he moved to Sweden to sign for Luleå HF.

Vihko was drafted 103rd overall in the 2002 NHL entry draft by the Mighty Ducks of Anaheim but never signed a contract and remained in Finland. He has represented Finland at U20 level.

== Career statistics ==
			Regular season					Playoffs
Season	Team	League	GP	G	A	Pts	PIM	GP	G	A	Pts	PIM
1996–97	Kiekko–Vantaa	FIN.2 U18	2	1	0	1	2	—	—	—	—	—
1998–99	HIFK	FIN U18	31	15	14	29	10	3	1	1	2	0
1998–99	HIFK	FIN U20	1	0	0	0	0	—	—	—	—	—
1999–2000	HIFK	FIN U20	38	12	15	27	36	3	0	0	0	0
2000–01	HIFK	FIN U20	27	23	17	40	85	7	5	2	7	18
2000–01	HIFK	SM-liiga	3	0	0	0	2	—	—	—	—	—
2001–02	HIFK	SM-liiga	48	13	11	24	89	—	—	—	—	—
2001–02	HIFK	FIN U20	—	—	—	—	—	2	0	2	2	4
2002–03	HIFK	SM-liiga	50	14	11	25	20	1	0	0	0	2
2003–04	HIFK	SM-liiga	52	9	8	17	56	13	3	5	8	6
2004–05	HIFK	SM-liiga	51	5	11	16	24	4	0	0	0	2
2004–05	HC Salamat	Mestis	1	0	0	0	2	—	—	—	—	—
2005–06	HIFK	SM-liiga	14	1	1	2	6	—	—	—	—	—
2005–06	SaiPa	SM-liiga	42	19	10	29	59	8	4	0	4	29
2006–07	HPK	SM-liiga	46	10	12	22	36	2	0	1	1	0
2007–08	HPK	SM-liiga	48	7	17	24	68	—	—	—	—	—
2008–09	HPK	SM-liiga	57	12	9	21	84	6	1	1	2	8
2009–10	HPK	SM-liiga	56	25	15	40	50	17	6	8	14	2
2010–11	Luleå HF	SEL	54	11	17	28	14	13	6	0	6	4
2011–12	Luleå HF	SEL	50	5	7	12	18	5	1	0	1	0
2012–13	Luleå HF	SEL	49	15	8	23	12	15	2	1	3	6
2013–14	HPK	Liiga	58	11	16	27	36	3	0	0	0	0
2014–15	HPK	Liiga	59	12	10	22	40	—	—	—	—	—
2015–16	Ilves	Liiga	58	10	15	25	16	—	—	—	—	—
2016–17	Ilves	Liiga	6	0	0	0	2	—	—	—	—	—
2016–17	Sport	Liiga	23	1	1	2	2	—	—	—	—	—
2017–18	Tölzer Löwen	GER.2	36	17	12	29	14	—	—	—	—	—
SM-liiga/Liiga totals			671	149	147	296	590	54	14	15	29	49
SEL totals			153	31	32	63	44	33	9	1	10	10
