= Nikola Gajovský =

Czech ice hockey player

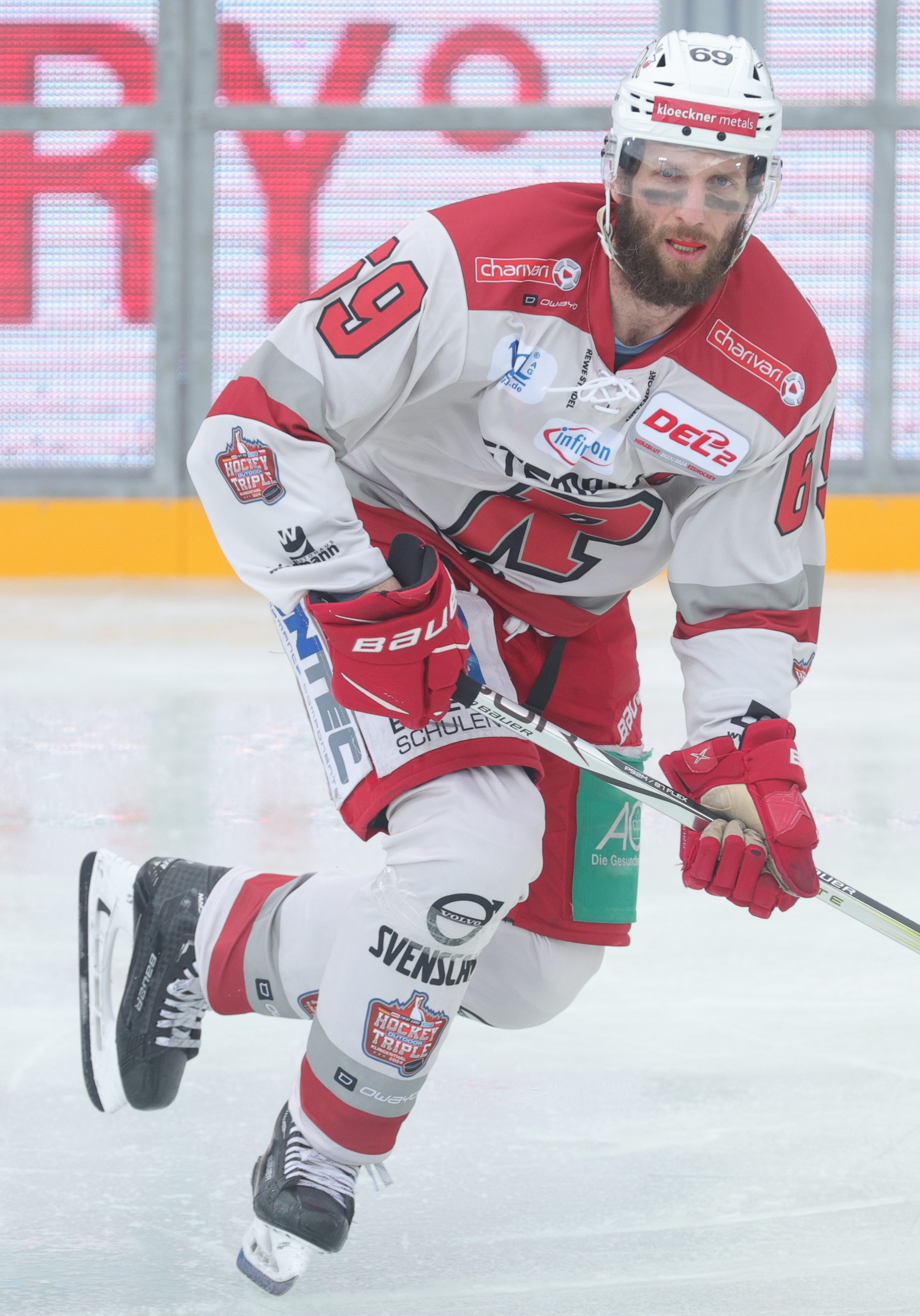
- Gajovský in 2024
- Born: March 16, 1987 (age 38); Písek, Czechoslovakia
- Height: 6 ft 1 in (185 cm)
- Weight: 181 lb (82 kg; 12 st 13 lb)
- Position: Forward
- Shoots: Left
- Czech Extraliga team: BK Mladá Boleslav
- Playing career: 2008–present

Nikola Gajovský (born February 24, 1987) is a Czech professional ice hockey player. He played with BK Mladá Boleslav in the Czech Extraliga during the 2010–11 Czech Extraliga season.
