= Viktor Kokman =

Swedish ice hockey player

- Born: March 1, 1993 (age 32); Norrköping, Sweden
- Height: 6 ft 2 in (188 cm)
- Weight: 194 lb (88 kg; 13 st 12 lb)
- Position: Goaltender
- Catches: Left
- GET-ligaen team Former teams: Storhamar Ishockey; HV71
- NHL draft: Undrafted
- Playing career: 2012–present

Viktor Kokman (born March 1, 1993) is a Swedish ice hockey goaltender. He is currently playing with Storhamar Ishockey of GET-ligaen.

Kokman made his Elitserien debut playing with HV71 during the 2012–13 Elitserien season.
