= Paběnice =

- Municipality
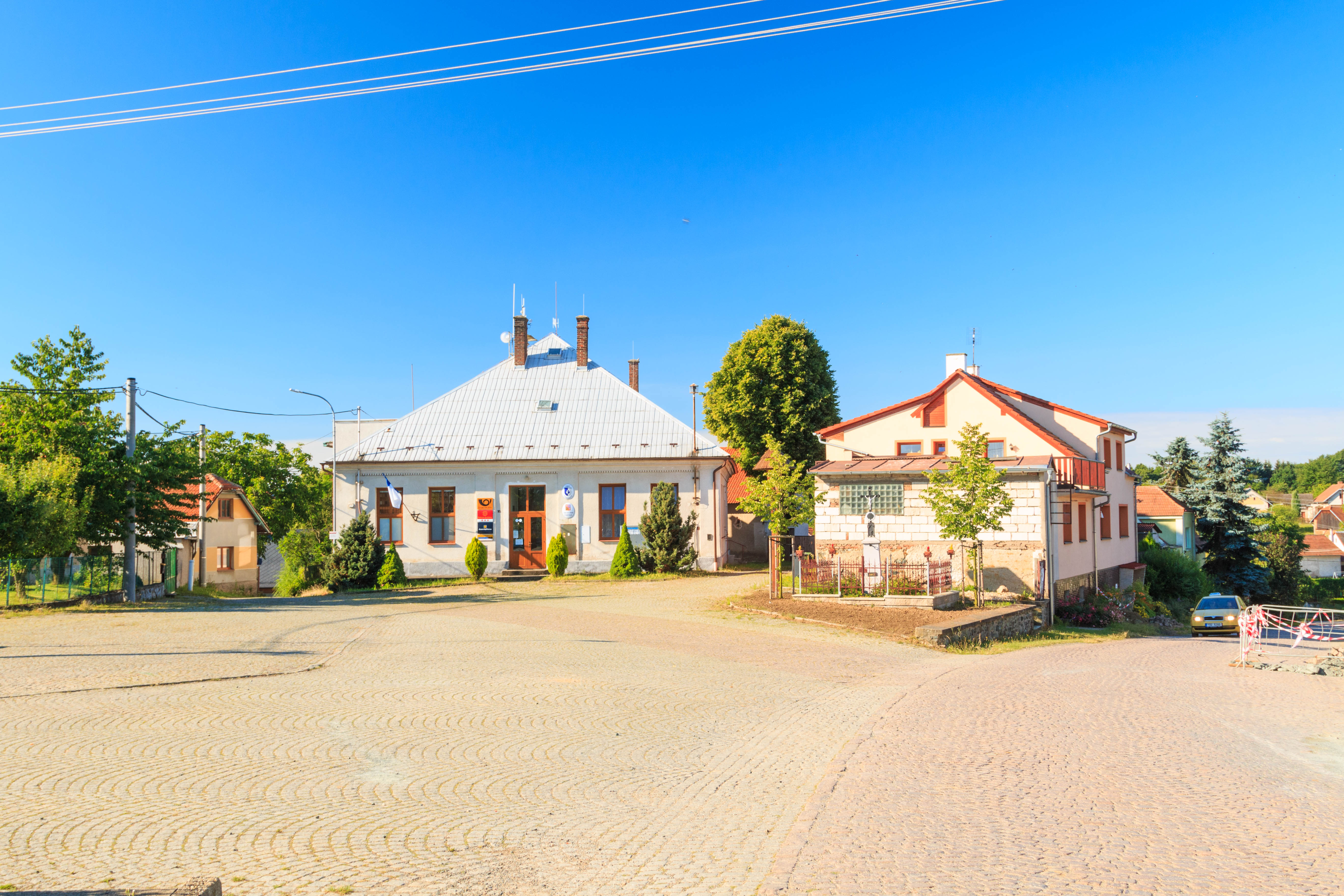
- Municipal office

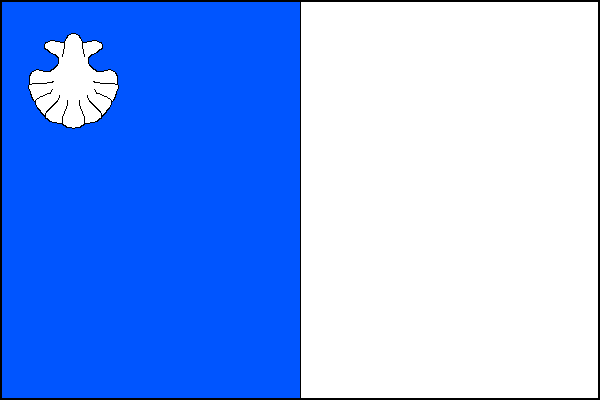
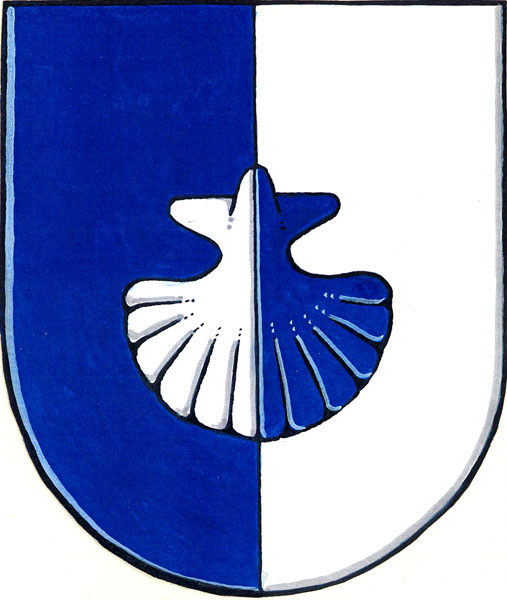
- Flag Coat of arms

- Location in the Czech Republic
- Coordinates: 49°50′30″N 15°18′9″E
- Country: Czech Republic
- Region: Central Bohemian
- District: Kutná Hora
- First mentioned: 1279

Area
  - Total: 5.97 km^{2} (2.31 sq mi)
- Elevation: 379 m (1,243 ft)

Population (2026-01-01)
  - Total: 223
  - Density: 37.4/km^{2} (96.7/sq mi)
- Time zone: UTC+1 (CET)
  - Summer (DST): UTC+2 (CEST)
- Postal code: 285 43
- Website: www.pabenice.cz

Paběnice is a municipality and village in Kutná Hora District in the Central Bohemian Region of the Czech Republic. It has about 200 inhabitants.

== Demographics ==
Historical population
Year	Pop.	±%
1869	549	—
1880	519	−5.5%
1890	483	−6.9%
1900	466	−3.5%
1910	468	+0.4%
1921	477	+1.9%
1930	408	−14.5%
1950	288	−29.4%
1961	290	+0.7%
1970	219	−24.5%
1980	196	−10.5%
1991	158	−19.4%
2001	177	+12.0%
2011	166	−6.2%
2021	210	+26.5%
Source: Censuses
