= Milan Řehoř (ice hockey) =

Czech ice hockey player

- Born: June 23, 1984 (age 42) Žďár nad Sázavou, Czechoslovakia
- Height: 6 ft 3 in (191 cm)
- Weight: 220 lb (100 kg; 15 st 10 lb)
- Position: Goaltender
- Catches: Left
- Czech-4 team Former teams: HHK Velké Meziříčí; HC Oceláři Třinec; Piráti Chomutov; HC Karlovy Vary; BK Mladá Boleslav
- NHL draft: Undrafted
- Playing career: 2004–present

Milan Řehoř (born June 23, 1984) is a Czech professional ice hockey goaltender.

Řehoř made his Czech Extraliga debut playing with HC Oceláři Třinec during the 2008–09 Czech Extraliga season, playing one game whilst on loan from HC Dukla Jihlava of the 1st Czech Republic Hockey League. He signed for Piráti Chomutov of the 1st League in 2011 and played in the Czech Extraliga with the team the following season following their promotion. He would also play one game for HC Karlovy Vary and BK Mladá Boleslav in separate loan spells. He currently plays for fourth-tier side HHK Velké Meziříčí.
