= HC Bílí Tygři Liberec =

Bílí Tygři Liberec
- City: Liberec
- League: Czech Extraliga
- Founded: 1956
- Home arena: Home Credit Arena (capacity: 7,500)
- Colours: Navy blue, aqua blue, white
- General manager: (Czech Republic) Ctibor Jech
- Head coach: (Czech Republic) Jiří Kudrna
- Captain: (Czech Republic) Radim Šimek
- Website: hcbilitygri.cz

Bílí Tygři Liberec (English: Liberec White Tigers) are a professional ice hockey club based in Liberec, Czech Republic. The team competes in the Czech Extraliga, the highest level of play in professional Czech ice hockey.

== History ==
The first hockey club in Liberec was founded in 1934 under the name SK Rapid Horní Růžodol. After the WWII, there have been two sections: Jiskra Kolora and Tatran. In 1956, a new ice rink was built in Liberec and the clubs agreed to merge, under the name TJ Lokomotiva Liberec. In 1961 the club was renamed to TJ Stadion Liberec.

Since 1985, the level of Liberec hockey began to decline and the team played in the third highest competition. It has been given its current name since 2000 and the team returned to the Czech Extraliga in 2002. On 5 October 2010, as the first Czech ice hockey club played on their home ice with an NHL team, specifically in the preparatory match with the Boston Bruins. In the 2015/16 season, Liberec won its first ever Czech Champion title.

== Honours ==
=== Domestic ===
Czech Extraliga

- (gold) Winners: 2015–16
- (silver) Runners-up: 2016–17, 2018–19, 2020–21
- (bronze) 3rd place: 2004–05, 2006–07

Czech 1. Liga

- (gold) Winners: 2001–02
- (silver) Runners-up: 1997–98, 2000–01

== Players ==
=== Current roster ===
Source: hcbilitygri.czSource: eliteprospects.comAs of October 16, 2021.

No.	Nat	Player	Pos	S/G	Age	Acquired	Birthplace
16	(Czech Republic)	Michal Birner	LW	L	40	2018	Litoměřice, Czechoslovakia
17	(Czech Republic)	Lukáš Derner	D	L	42	2005	Liberec, Czechoslovakia
77	(Slovakia)	Martin Faško-Rudáš	LW	R	25	2021	Banská Bystrica, Slovakia
41	(Czech Republic)	Tomáš Filippi	RW	L	34	2020	Rychnov nad Kněžnou, Czechoslovakia
19	(Czech Republic)	Oscar Flynn	RW	R	27	2022	Burnley, Great Britain
–	(Slovakia)	Dávid Hrenák	G	L	28	2023	Považská Bystrica, Slovakia
29	(Slovakia)	Michal Ivan	D	L	26	2021	Žiar nad Hronom, Slovakia
26	(Czech Republic)	Petr Jelínek	C	L	41	2014	Prague, Czechoslovakia
21	(Czech Republic)	Jakub Klepiš	RW	R	41	2021	Prague, Czechoslovakia
28	(Czech Republic)	Jan Šír	C	R	26	2019	Liberec, Czech Republic
23	(Canada)	T.J. Melancon	D	R	29	2021	Oshawa, Canada
69	(Czech Republic)	Marek Zachar	LW	L	27	2018	Liberec, Czech Republic
5	(Czech Republic)	Ladislav Šmíd	D	L	40	2017	Frýdlant, Czechoslovakia
–	(Slovakia)	Miroslav Mucha	RW	L	28	2023	Bytča, Slovakia
18	(Czech Republic)	Jakub Rychlovský	LW	L	24	2019	Vrchlabí, Czech Republic
–	(Slovakia)	Rayen Petrovický	D	L	24	2023	Bellinzona, Switzerland
55	(Czech Republic)	Vratislav Kunst	D	L	27	2019	Prague, Czech Republic
19	(Czech Republic)	Daniel Špaček	RW	R	40	2007	Liberec, Czechoslovakia
59	(Czech Republic)	Petr Kolmann	D	L	37	2008	Liberec, Czechoslovakia
53	(Czech Republic)	Jaroslav Vlach	LW	L	34	2012	Paběnice, Czechoslovakia
71	(Czech Republic)	Adam Najman	C	L	25	2018	Jihlava, Czech Republic
73	(Czech Republic)	Jan Štibingr	D	R	26	2020	Prague, Czech Republic
45	(Czech Republic)	Jan Ordoš	RW	R	29	2021	Ústí nad Labem, Czech Republic
43	(Czech Republic)	Ondřej Vitásek	D	L	35	2020	Prostějov, Czechoslovakia

Preceded by HC Verva Litvínov	Czech Extraliga Champions; 2015–16	Succeeded by HC Kometa Brno
