= Patryk Wajda =

Polish ice hockey player

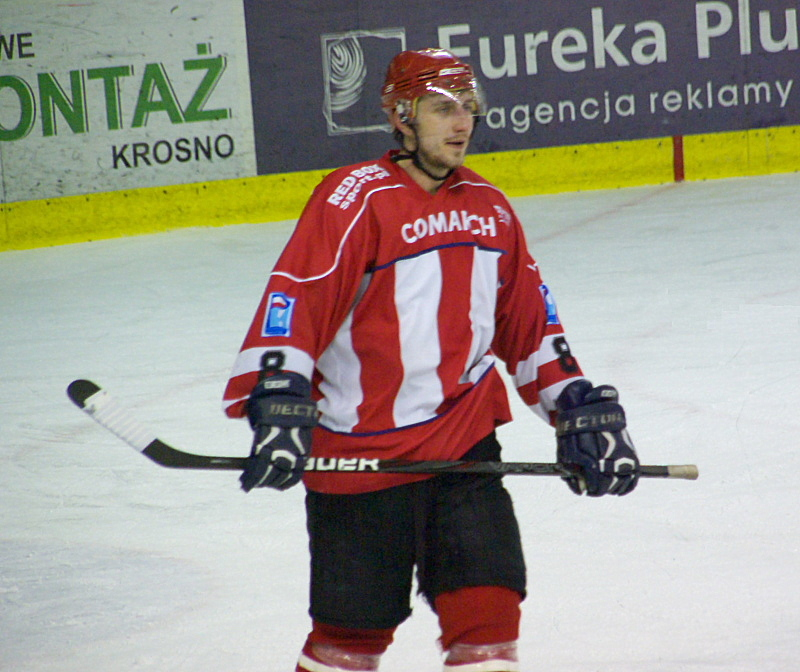
- Born: May 20, 1988 (age 38) Poland
- Height: 6 ft 0 in (183 cm)
- Weight: 181 lb (82 kg; 12 st 13 lb)
- Position: Defence
- Shoots: Left
- PHL team Former teams: Cracovia; KH Sanok
- National team: Poland
- Playing career: 2006–present

Patryk Wajda (born May 20, 1988) is a Polish ice hockey player for Cracovia and the Polish national team.

== Career statistics ==
=== Regular season and playoffs ===
			Regular season					Playoffs
Season	Team	League	GP	G	A	Pts	PIM	GP	G	A	Pts	PIM
2004–05	SMS II Sosnowiec	Poland 2	—	—	—	—	—	—	—	—	—	—
2005–06	SMS II Sosnowiec	Poland 2	—	—	—	—	—	—	—	—	—	—
2006–07	SMS I Sosnowiec	Poland 2	—	—	—	—	—	—	—	—	—	—
2006–07	Cracovia	PLH	29	1	3	4	14	—	—	—	—	—
2007–08	Cracovia	PLH	35	2	1	3	31	—	—	—	—	—
2008–09	Cracovia II	Poland 2	5	0	4	4	2	—	—	—	—	—
2008–09	Cracovia	PLH	42	1	8	9	16	—	—	—	—	—
2009–10	Cracovia	PLH	53	1	2	3	4	—	—	—	—	—
2010–11	Cracovia	PLH	32	3	1	4	16	10	0	1	1	4
2011–12	Cracovia	PLH	34	0	3	3	20	9	0	3	3	2
2012–13	Ciarko PBS Bank KH Sanok	PLH	37	2	7	9	14	10	1	2	3	2
2013–14	KTH Krynica	PLH	19	2	6	8	10	—	—	—	—	—
2013–14	Cracovia	PLH	5	0	4	4	0
PLH totals			286	12	35	47	125	29	1	6	7	8

=== International ===
Year	Team	Comp	GP	G	A	Pts	PIM
2004–05	Poland U18	WJC18 D1	5	0	1	1	4
2005–06	Poland U18	WJC18 D1	5	1	0	1	2
2006–07	Poland U20	WJC20 D1	5	1	1	2	4
2007–08	Poland U20	WJC20 D1	5	0	2	2	0
2009-10	Poland	WC D1	5	1	0	1	0
2010-11	Poland	WC D1	5	0	0	0	6
2011-12	Poland	WC D1B	5	0	5	5	4
2012-13	Poland	WC D1B	5	0	1	1	0
2013-14	Poland	WC D1B	5	0	0	0	6
2014-15	Poland	WC D1A	5	0	0	0	0
2015-16	Poland	WC D1A	4	1	0	1	0
2016-17	Poland	WC D1A	5	0	0	0	0
2018-19	Poland	WC D1B	5	0	0	0	0
2021-22	Poland	WC D1B	4	0	1	1	2
2022-23	Poland	WC D1A	5	0	1	1	0
2023-24	Poland	WC	7	0	1	1	0
Junior totals			20	2	4	6	10
Senior totals			60	2	9	11	18
