= Ekstraklasa (ice hockey) =

- Formerly: I Liga; Polska Liga Hokejowa
- Sport: Ice hockey
- Founded: 1926 (Original); 1955 (I Liga)
- Founder: Polish Ice Hockey Federation
- First season: 1955–56
- Country: Poland
- Most titles: Podhale Nowy Targ (19)
- Related competitions: Polish Cup; Polish 1. Liga
- Website: hokej.net

The Polish ice hockey Ekstraklasa (Polish: Ekstraliga polska w hokeju na lodzie) was the premier ice hockey league in Poland. Previously, it was known as the I Liga or Ekstraklasa from 1926–1999, and the Polska Liga Hokejowa from 1999–2013. In 2013, it was reorganized as a limited liability company and renamed the Polska Hokej Liga.

== History ==
The championship started in 1925-26. At first it was a non-league system composed of regional tournaments. The tournaments had two stages. The best teams qualified to the final tournament, of which the winner was declared champion. In 1938, the Polish Ice Hockey Federation decided to reorganise the championship, by creating a league system. Those plans were abandoned due to outbreak of World War II.

The current structure of the league began in 1955.

The 2019-20 season was suspended on March 11, 2020, due to health concerns with the spreading coronavirus. GKS Tychy was named league champions and will represent the league in the Champions Hockey League, Re-Plast Unia Oświęcim was named the runner ups and earned a spot in the Continental Cup, third-place was shared by JKH GKS Jastrzębie and GKS Katowice

== Medalists ==
Year	1st place	2nd place	3rd place
1925-26			
1926-27	AZS Warszawa	WTŁ Warszawa	Pogoń Lwów
1927-28	AZS Warszawa	Legia Warszawa	TKS Toruń
1928-29	AZS Warszawa	Pogoń Lwów	Legia Warszawa
1929-30	AZS Warszawa	Pogoń Lwów	Legia Warszawa
1930-31	AZS Warszawa	Legia Warszawa	AZS Poznań
1931-32			
1932-33	Legia Warszawa & Pogoń Lwów		AZS Poznań
1933-34	AZS Poznań	Czarni Lwów	Lechia Lwów
1934-35	Czarni Lwów	Lechia Lwów	KS Cracovia
1935-36			
1936-37	KS Cracovia	Warszawianka	KTH Krynica
1937-38			
1938-39	Dąb Katowice	Warszawianka	Ognisko Wilno
1940–45			
1945-46	KS Cracovia	ŁKS Łódź	Siła Giszowiec
1946-47	KS Cracovia	Wisła Kraków	ŁKS Łódź
1947-48	KS Cracovia		
1948-49	KS Cracovia	KTH Krynica	Legia Warszawa
1949-50	KTH Krynica	Górnik Janów	Kolejarz Toruń
1950-51	Legia Warszawa	KTH Krynica	KS Cracovia
1951-52	Legia Warszawa	Górnik Janów	KTH Krynica
1952-53	Legia Warszawa	KTH Krynica	Górnik Janów
1953-54	Legia Warszawa	Gwardia Bydgoszcz	Górnik Janów
1954-55	Legia Warszawa	Gwardia Bydgoszcz	Górnik Katowice
1955-56	Legia Warszawa	Górnik Katowice	Start Katowice
1956-57	Legia Warszawa	Górnik Katowice	KTH Krynica
1957-58	Górnik Katowice	Legia Warszawa	Podhale Nowy Targ
1958-59	Legia Warszawa	Górnik Katowice	ŁKS Łódź
1959-60	Górnik Katowice	Legia Warszawa	Podhale Nowy Targ
1960-61	Legia Warszawa	Górnik Katowice	Podhale Nowy Targ
1961-62	Górnik Katowice	Legia Warszawa	Podhale Nowy Targ
1962-63	Legia Warszawa	Podhale Nowy Targ	Górnik Katowice
1963-64	Legia Warszawa	Podhale Nowy Targ	Polonia Bydgoszcz
1964-65	GKS Katowice	Legia Warszawa	Polonia Bydgoszcz
1965-66	Podhale Nowy Targ	Legia Warszawa	GKS Katowice
1966-67	Legia Warszawa	GKS Katowice	Pomorzanin Toruń
1967-68	GKS Katowice	Pomorzanin Toruń	Podhale Nowy Targ
1968-69	Podhale Nowy Targ	GKS Katowice	Pomorzanin Toruń
1969-70	GKS Katowice	Podhale Nowy Targ	KS Baildon Katowice
1970-71	Podhale Nowy Targ	Naprzód Janów	ŁKS Łódź
1971-72	Podhale Nowy Targ	KS Baildon Katowice	Naprzód Janów
1972-73	Podhale Nowy Targ	Naprzód Janów	KS Baildon Katowice
1973-74	Podhale Nowy Targ	KS Baildon Katowice	Naprzód Janów
1974-75	Podhale Nowy Targ	KS Baildon Katowice	GKS Katowice
1975-76	Podhale Nowy Targ	KS Baildon Katowice	Naprzód Janów
1976-77	Podhale Nowy Targ	Naprzód Janów	KS Baildon Katowice
1977-78	Podhale Nowy Targ	Zagłębie Sosnowiec	Naprzód Janów
1978-79	Podhale Nowy Targ	Zagłębie Sosnowiec	ŁKS Łódź
1979-80	Zagłębie Sosnowiec	Podhale Nowy Targ	ŁKS Łódź
1980-81	Zagłębie Sosnowiec	Podhale Nowy Targ	GKS Tychy
1981-82	Zagłębie Sosnowiec	Podhale Nowy Targ	Naprzód Janów
1982-83	Zagłębie Sosnowiec	TMH Polonia Bytom	GKS Tychy
1983-84	TMH Polonia Bytom	Zagłębie Sosnowiec	Podhale Nowy Targ
1984-85	Zagłębie Sosnowiec	TMH Polonia Bytom	Podhale Nowy Targ
1985-86	TMH Polonia Bytom	Podhale Nowy Targ	Naprzód Janów
1986-87	Podhale Nowy Targ	TMH Polonia Bytom	Naprzód Janów
1987-88	TMH Polonia Bytom	GKS Tychy	Zagłębie Sosnowiec
1988-89	TMH Polonia Bytom	Naprzód Janów	Podhale Nowy Targ
1989-90	TMH Polonia Bytom	Podhale Nowy Targ	Zagłębie Sosnowiec
1990-91	TMH Polonia Bytom	KS Unia Oświęcim	Podhale Nowy Targ
1991-92	KS Unia Oświęcim	Naprzód Janów	Podhale Nowy Targ
1992-93	Podhale Nowy Targ	KS Unia Oświęcim	TMH Polonia Bytom
1993-94	Podhale Nowy Targ	KS Unia Oświęcim	Górnik Katowice
1994-95	Podhale Nowy Targ	KS Unia Oświęcim	KKH Katowice
1995-96	Podhale Nowy Targ	KS Unia Oświęcim	TTH Toruń
1996-97	Podhale Nowy Targ	KS Unia Oświęcim	KKH Katowice
1997-98	KS Unia Oświęcim	Podhale Nowy Targ	KKH Katowice
1998-99	KS Unia Oświęcim	KTH Krynica	Podhale Nowy Targ
1999-2000	Dwory Unia Oświęcim	Podhale Nowy Targ	KTH Krynica
2000-01	Dwory Unia Oświęcim	GKS Katowice	TMH Polonia Bytom
2001-02	Dwory Unia Oświęcim	GKS Katowice	GKS Tychy
2002-03	Dwory Unia Oświęcim	GKS Katowice	Stoczniowiec Gdańsk
2003-04	Dwory Unia Oświęcim	Podhale Nowy Targ	GKS Tychy
2004-05	GKS Tychy	Dwory Unia Oświęcim	KS Cracovia
2005-06	KS Cracovia	GKS Tychy	Podhale Nowy Targ
2006-07	Podhale Nowy Targ	GKS Tychy	KS Cracovia
2007-08	KS Cracovia	GKS Tychy	Podhale Nowy Targ
2008-09	KS Cracovia	GKS Tychy	Podhale Nowy Targ
2009-10	Podhale Nowy Targ	KS Cracovia	GKS Tychy
2010-11	KS Cracovia	GKS Tychy	TH Unia Oświęcim
2011-12	KH Sanok	KS Cracovia	TH Unia Oświęcim
2012-13	KS Cracovia	JKH GKS Jastrzębie	GKS Tychy
2013-14	KH Sanok	GKS Tychy	JKH GKS Jastrzebie
2014-15	GKS Tychy	JKH GKS Jastrzebie	Podhale Nowy Targ
2015-16	Cracovia Krakow	GKS Tychy	Podhale Nowy Targ
2016-17	Cracovia Krakow	GKS Tychy	Polonia Bytom
2017-18	GKS Tychy	GKS Katowice	Podhale Nowy Targ
2018-19	GKS Tychy	Cracovia Krakow	KH GKS Katowice

== Titles by team ==
Titles	Team	Year
19	Podhale Nowy Targ	1966, 1969, 1971, 1972, 1973, 1974, 1975, 1976, 1977, 1978, 1979, 1987, 1993, 1994, 1995, 1996, 1997, 2007, 2010
13	Legia Warszawa	1933, 1951, 1952, 1953, 1954, 1955, 1956, 1957, 1959, 1961, 1963, 1964, 1967
11	KS Cracovia	1937, 1946, 1947, 1949, 2006, 2008, 2009, 2011, 2013, 2016, 2017
8	Unia Oświęcim	1992, 1998, 1999, 2000, 2001, 2002, 2003, 2004
6	GKS Katowice	1958, 1960, 1962, 1965, 1968, 1970
6	Polonia Bytom	1984, 1986, 1988, 1989, 1990, 1991
5	AZS Warszawa	1926, 1927, 1928, 1929, 1930
5	Zagłębie Sosnowiec	1980, 1981, 1982, 1983, 1985
4	GKS Tychy	2005, 2015, 2018, 2019
2	KH Sanok	2012, 2014
1	Pogoń Lwów	1933
1	AZS Poznan	1934
1	Czarni Lwów	1935
1	Dąb Katowice	1939
1	KTH Krynica	1950
