= Aron Chmielewski =

Polish professional ice hockey player

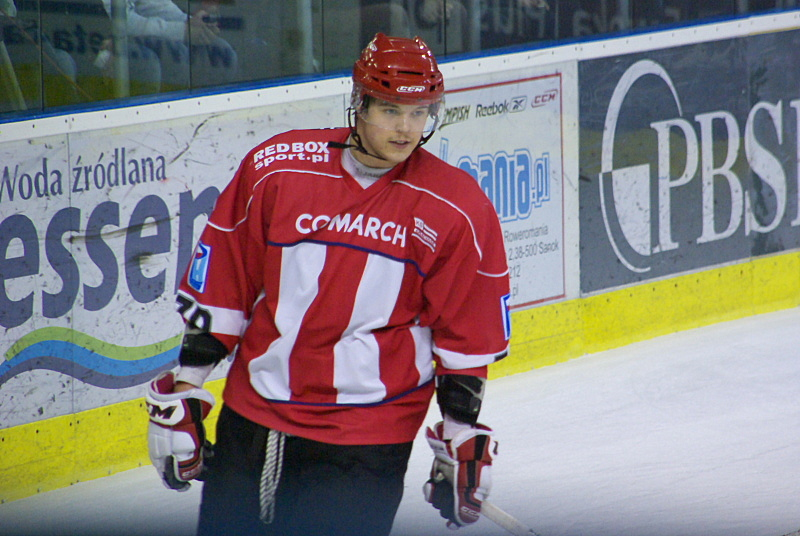
- Born: October 9, 1991 (age 33); Gdańsk, Poland
- Height: 6 ft 3 in (191 cm)
- Weight: 187 lb (85 kg; 13 st 5 lb)
- Position: Forward
- Shoots: Right
- Czech team Former teams: HC Oceláři Třinec; Stoczniowiec Gdańsk (PHL); Cracovia (PHL); AZ Havířov (Czech2); HC Frýdek-Místek (Czech3)
- National team: Poland
- NHL draft: Undrafted
- Playing career: 2009–present

Aron Chmielewski (born October 9, 1991) is a Polish professional ice hockey player. He currently plays for HC Oceláři Třinec of the Czech Extraliga and the Polish national team.

== Professional career ==
He started his professional career with Stoczniowiec Gdańsk in 2009. After two seasons in Gdańsk, he moved to Cracovia in 2011. He spent a total of three seasons in Cracovia, leading the team in points at the end of the 2013–14 season, producing 69 points in 48 games.

In April 2014, Chmielewski transferred to HC Oceláři Třinec of the Czech Extraliga, and made his debut during the 2014–15 Czech Extraliga season. In September 2014, he was loaned to AZ Havířov of the Czech 1. League, the second level ice hockey league in the country. He spent the 2014–15 season playing for both clubs. In the 2015–16 season, he found himself in a similar arrangement to the previous season, splitting time between HC Oceláři Třinec and on loan with the (Czech 2. League team HC Frýdek-Místek.

== International career ==
Chmielewski started his national team career playing for Poland's U18 team at the IIHF World U18 Championship (Division I) in both 2008 and 2009.

He played for the Polish U20 team at the IIHF World U20 Championship in 2010 (Division I) and 2011 (Division II).

He later joined Poland's national team, playing at the 2014 IIHF World Championship Division I and 2015 IIHF World Championship Division I.

== Personal life ==
His father was also a professional hockey player. He is a member of the Pentecostal church, and has been married to Paulina Chmielewska since July 2012.

== Career statistics ==
=== Regular season and playoffs ===
			Regular season					Playoffs
Season	Team	League	GP	G	A	Pts	PIM	GP	G	A	Pts	PIM
2007–08	Hannover Indians U18	Jugend-BL	15	19	14	33	57	—	—	—	—	—
2008–09	Hannover Indians U18	Jugend-BL	2	1	0	1	2	—	—	—	—	—
2008–09	Stoczniowiec Gdańsk II	Pol-2	28	22	6	28	92	—	—	—	—	—
2009–10	Stoczniowiec Gdańsk	PLH	44	17	13	30	22	—	—	—	—	—
2010–11	Stoczniowiec Gdańsk	PLH	33	26	19	45	68	11	9	6	15	18
2011–12	Cracovia	PLH	30	16	11	27	55	9	1	5	6	0
2012–13	Cracovia	PLH	38	16	9	25	16	16	2	3	5	2
2013–14	Cracovia	PLH	48	33	36	69	26	5	2	2	4	2
2014–15	Oceláři Třinec	CZE	19	2	2	4	6	1	0	0	0	0
2014–15	AZ Havířov	CZE-2	26	8	9	17	28	4	4	0	4	6
2015–16	Oceláři Třinec	CZE	13	2	2	4	10	—	—	—	—	—
2015–16	Frydek-Mistek	CZE-3	28	23	18	41	20	—	—	—	—	—
2016–17	Oceláři Třinec	CZE	12	2	0	2	4	—	—	—	—	—
2016–17	Frydek-Mistek	CZE-2	39	15	19	34	28	10	4	7	11	4
2017–18	Oceláři Třinec	CZE	34	3	8	11	12	6	2	1	3	33
2017–18	Frydek-Mistek	CZE-2	11	4	7	11	8	—	—	—	—	—
2018–19	Oceláři Třinec	CZE	52	11	7	18	16	17	3	2	5	4
2018–19	Frydek-Mistek	CZE-2	1	2	2	4	0	—	—	—	—	—
PHL totals			193	108	88	196	187	41	14	16	30	22
CZE totals			148	23	23	46	58	24	5	3	8	37
