= Vladimír Búřil =

Slovak ice hockey player

- Born: 17 May 1969 (age 57) Bratislava, Czechoslovakia (present day Slovakia)
- Height: 6 ft 3 in (191 cm)
- Weight: 212 lb (96 kg; 15 st 2 lb)
- Position: Defence
- Shot: Left
- Played for: HC Slovan Bratislava; Bordeaux; Wilhelmshaven-Stickhausen EC; Heilbronn Falcons; Zilina HK-SKP; Székesfehérvár; MsHK Zilina; Podhale Nowy Targ; Cracovia Krakow; TKH Torun
- National team: Slovakia
- Playing career: 1988–2010

Vladimír Búřil (born 17 May 1969 in Bratislava, Czechoslovakia) is a Slovak former professional ice hockey player. Buril played with HC Slovan Bratislava in the Slovak Extraliga. Buril retired after the 2009–10 season. He is an uncle of a Canadian ice dancer, Andrew Poje.

== Playing career ==
Buril turned professional in 1998 with HC Slovan Bratislava. He would play eleven seasons in total with Slovan Bratislava during his career. In 1994, Buril transferred to France to play for Bordeaux for two seasons. He then returned to Slovan Bratislava, where he played until the 2000/01 season, when he was transferred to EC Wilhelmshaven-Stickhausen of the Germany 2 league for the season. Buril played three further seasons in the Germany2 league, for Heilbronner Falken. Buril returned to the Slovakian league in 2004 to play for MsHK Zilina. 2005/06 was with Székesfehérvár of the IEL, then back to Zilina in 06/07 before being transferred to Podhale Nowy Targ of Poland, which won the Polish championship. In 2007/08, Buril joined the Polish TKH Torun team, but was transferred mid-season to Cracovia Krakow where he was for the second time a member of a Polish championship squad. Buril returned to TKH Torun in 2008 for two further seasons.

Buril played internationally for Czechoslovakia in the 1989 World Junior championship. He played for Slovakia in the 1994 Winter Olympics.

== Career statistics ==
=== Regular season and playoffs ===
			Regular season					Playoffs
Season	Team	League	GP	G	A	Pts	PIM	GP	G	A	Pts	PIM
1987–88	HC Slovan Bratislava	TCH	31	0	4	4		—	—	—	—	—
1988–89	HC Slovan Bratislava	TCH	33	2	0	2	28	—	—	—	—	—
1989–90	HC Slovan Bratislava	SVK.2
1990–91	HC Slovan Bratislava	TCH	25	3	10	13	24	—	—	—	—	—
1991–92	HC Slovan Bratislava	TCH	31	3	3	6	16	—	—	—	—	—
1992–93	HC Slovan Bratislava	TCH	30	3	2	5		—	—	—	—	—
1993–94	HC Slovan Bratislava	SVK	41	8	7	15		—	—	—	—	—
1994–95	Aquitains de Bordeaux	FRA.2
1995–96	Dogues de Bordeaux	FRA.2
1996–97	HC Slovan Bratislava	SVK	42	4	11	15	46	—	—	—	—	—
1997–98	HC Slovan Bratislava	SVK	44	4	5	9	26	—	—	—	—	—
1998–99	HC Slovan Bratislava	SVK	42	2	9	11	87	—	—	—	—	—
1999–2000	HC Slovan Bratislava	SVK	43	2	1	3	60	—	—	—	—	—
2000–01	HC Slovan Bratislava	SVK	5	1	1	2	2	—	—	—	—	—
2000–01	EC Wilhelmshaven-Stickhausen	GER.2	42	15	19	34	77	5	2	0	2	4
2001–02	Heilbronner EC	GER.2	52	7	22	29	76	5	1	0	1	2
2002–03	Heilbronner EC	GER.2	51	12	21	33	48	4	0	1	1	2
2003–04	Heilbronner Falken	GER.2	44	5	12	17	84	—	—	—	—	—
2004–05	MsHK Žilina	SVK	35	5	5	10	24	5	0	0	0	4
2005–06	Alba Volán-FeVita	IEHL	24	6	3	9	58	8	2	0	2	16
2005–06	Alba Volán-FeVita	HUN	10	2	5	7	6	8	0	5	5	6
2006–07	MsHK Žilina a.s	SVK	18	1	0	1	20	—	—	—	—	—
2006–07	Podhale Nowy Targ	POL	33	4	9	13	20	—	—	—	—	—
2007–08	THK Torun	POL	37	11	17	28	64	—	—	—	—	—
2007–08	MKS Cracovia SSA	POL	16	3	3	6	30	—	—	—	—	—
2008–09	THK Torun	POL	42	10	9	19	60	—	—	—	—	—
2009–10	THK Torun	POL	42	6	8	14	38	—	—	—	—	—
TCH totals			150	11	19	30	—	—	—	—	—	—
SVK totals			270	27	39	66	265	5	0	0	0	4
GER.2 totals			189	39	74	113	285	14	3	1	4	8

=== International ===
Year	Team	Event	GP	G	A	Pts	PIM
1989	Czechoslovakia	WJC	7	0	2	2	8
1994	Slovakia	OG	4	0	0	0	0
Senior totals			4	0	0	0	0
