= Robin Bacul =

Czech ice hockey player

- Born: August 6, 1979 (age 46) Ostrava, Czechoslovakia
- Height: 6 ft 0 in (183 cm)
- Weight: 190 lb (86 kg; 13 st 8 lb)
- Position: Left wing
- Shot: Left
- Played for: HC Slavia Praha; HC Havířov; HC Karlovy Vary; HC České Budějovice; VHK Vsetín
- NHL draft: 173rd overall, 1997; Ottawa Senators
- Playing career: 1998–2012

Robin Bacul (born August 6, 1979) is a Czech former professional hockey player. He was selected 173rd overall by the Ottawa Senators in the 1997 NHL entry draft. He has played most of his career in the Czech Extraliga league, with teams such as Slavia Praha HC, Karlovy Vary HC, and Havirov Femax HC. He also played one year in the QMJHL for the Chicoutimi Sagueneens.

== Career statistics ==
			Regular season					Playoffs
Season	Team	League	GP	G	A	Pts	PIM	GP	G	A	Pts	PIM
1996–97	HC Slavia Praha U20	Czech U20	33	28	15	43	—	—	—	—	—	—
1996–97	HC Slavia Praha	Czech	6	0	0	0	0	—	—	—	—	—
1997–98	Chicoutimi Saguenéens	QMJHL	49	10	14	24	34	6	0	0	0	20
1998–99	HC Slavia Praha U20	Czech U20	—	—	—	—	—	—	—	—	—	—
1998–99	HC Slavia Praha	Czech	26	2	1	3	16	—	—	—	—	—
1999–00	HC Slavia Praha U20	Czech U20	2	2	2	4	31	3	3	1	4	2
1999–00	HC Slavia Praha	Czech	11	0	0	0	0	—	—	—	—	—
1999–00	HC 99 TL Mělník	Czech2	24	8	7	15	66	8	1	3	4	2
2000–01	HC Slavia Praha	Czech	16	0	2	2	4	—	—	—	—	—
2000–01	HC Havířov	Czech	19	3	4	7	10	—	—	—	—	—
2000–01	HC Berounsti Medvedi	Czech2	1	0	0	0	0	—	—	—	—	—
2000–01	KLH Chomutov	Czech2	9	3	6	9	31	—	—	—	—	—
2001–02	HC Havířov Panthers	Czech	50	13	19	32	32	—	—	—	—	—
2002–03	HC Energie Karlovy Vary	Czech	15	2	4	6	10	—	—	—	—	—
2003–04	HC Energie Karlovy Vary	Czech	30	5	5	10	22	—	—	—	—	—
2003–04	HC České Budějovice	Czech	19	2	4	6	8	—	—	—	—	—
2004–05	HC Valašské Meziříčí	Czech3	8	9	4	13	4	—	—	—	—	—
2004–05	GKS Tychy	Poland	11	5	9	14	22	12	3	3	6	29
2005–06	Vsetínská hokejová	Czech	20	0	0	0	6	—	—	—	—	—
2005–06	GKS Tychy	Poland	20	10	11	21	43	9	6	5	11	10
2006–07	GKS Tychy	Poland	23	16	9	25	39	13	11	4	15	22
2007–08	GKS Tychy	Poland	34	14	18	32	18	13	3	7	10	10
2008–09	GKS Tychy	Poland	40	27	22	49	46	14	8	7	15	16
2009–10	GKS Tychy	Poland	46	26	27	53	24	—	—	—	—	—
2010–11	KH Zagłębie Sosnowiec	Poland	9	3	5	8	6	—	—	—	—	—
2010–11	HC Valašské Meziříčí	Czech3	2	3	0	3	2	—	—	—	—	—
2011–12	HC Valašské Meziříčí	Czech3	4	3	1	4	2	—	—	—	—	—
Czech totals			212	27	39	66	108	—	—	—	—	—
