= 1997–98 Polska Liga Hokejowa season =

Polish ice hockey season

The 1997–98 Polska Liga Hokejowa season was the 63rd season of the Polska Liga Hokejowa, the top level of ice hockey in Poland. Thirteen teams participated in the league, and Unia Oswiecim won the championship.

== Final round ==
	Club	GP	W	T	L	Goals	Pts
1.	Podhale Nowy Targ	30	22	3	5	106:70	47
2.	Unia Oświęcim	30	17	3	10	106:78	37
3.	STS Sanok	30	16	2	12	118:92	34
4.	KKH Katowice	30	15	1	14	103:83	31
5.	KTH Krynica	30	10	0	20	91:122	20
6.	Stocznowiec Gdansk	30	5	1	24	83:162	11

== Qualification round ==
	Club	GP	W	T	L	Goals	Pts
7.	KS Cracovia	24	21	0	3	129:72	42
8.	TTH Torun	24	18	0	6	118:75	36
9.	TTS Tychy	24	16	1	7	137:90	33
10.	SMS Sosnowiec	24	12	0	12	137:95	24
11.	Naprzód Janów	24	9	2	13	93:83	20
12.	Polonia Bytom	24	6	1	17	83:134	13
13.	SMS Sosnowiec II	24	0	0	24	43:191	0

== Playoffs ==
Quarter-finals
STS Sanok	1
Stocznowiec Gdansk	3
Unia Oświęcim	3
KS Cracovia	0
Podhale Nowy Targ	3
TTH Torun	0
KKH Katowice	3
KTH Krynica	0

Semi-finals
Stocznowiec Gdansk	1
Unia Oświęcim	3
Podhale Nowy Targ	3
KKH Katowice	2

Final
Unia Oświęcim	4
Podhale Nowy Targ	2
Third place
KKH Katowice	3
Stocznowiec Gdansk	2
