= 1993–94 Polska Liga Hokejowa season =

Polish ice hockey season

The 1993–94 Polska Liga Hokejowa season was the 59th season of the Polska Liga Hokejowa, the top level of ice hockey in Poland. 10 teams participated in the league, and Podhale Nowy Targ won the championship.

== Final round ==
	Club	GP	W	T	L	Goals	Pts
1.	Podhale Nowy Targ	30	29	1	0	213:57	59
2.	Unia Oświęcim	30	18	2	10	141:88	38
3.	Naprzód Janów	30	17	1	12	129:108	35
4.	Polonia Bytom	30	14	0	16	96:141	28

== Qualification round ==
	Club	GP	W	T	L	Goals	Pts
5.	GKS Katowice	28	14	2	12	138:95	30
6.	GKS Tychy	28	12	4	12	90:75	28
7.	STS Sanok	28	11	6	11	85:93	28
8.	KS Toruń	28	10	3	15	125:131	23
9.	KS Cracovia	28	6	3	19	60:116	15
10.	Stoczniowiec Gdansk	28	2	0	26	55:228	4

== Playoffs ==
Quarter-finals
Podhale Nowy Targ	3
KS Toruń	1
Polonia Bytom	1
GKS Katowice	3
Naprzód Janów	3
GKS Tychy	1
Unia Oświęcim	3
STS Sanok	2

Semi-finals
Podhale Nowy Targ	4
GKS Katowice	0
Unia Oświęcim	4
Naprzód Janów	3

Final
Podhale Nowy Targ	4
Unia Oświęcim	0
Third place
GKS Katowice	4
Naprzód Janów	0

== Relegation round ==
	Club	GP	W	T	L	Goals	Pts
5.	GKS Tychy	10	9	0	1	56:24	18
6.	KS Toruń	10	7	0	3	46:33	14
7.	STS Sanok	10	5	1	4	45:31	11
8.	Polonia Bytom	10	4	1	5	38:45	9
9.	KS Cracovia	10	4	0	6	36:38	8
10.	Stoczniowiec Gdansk	10	1	0	9	17:53	2

== Relegation ==
- Stocznowiec Gdansk - BTH Bydgoszcz 2:2/3:1
