= Pavel Mojžíš =

Czech ice hockey player

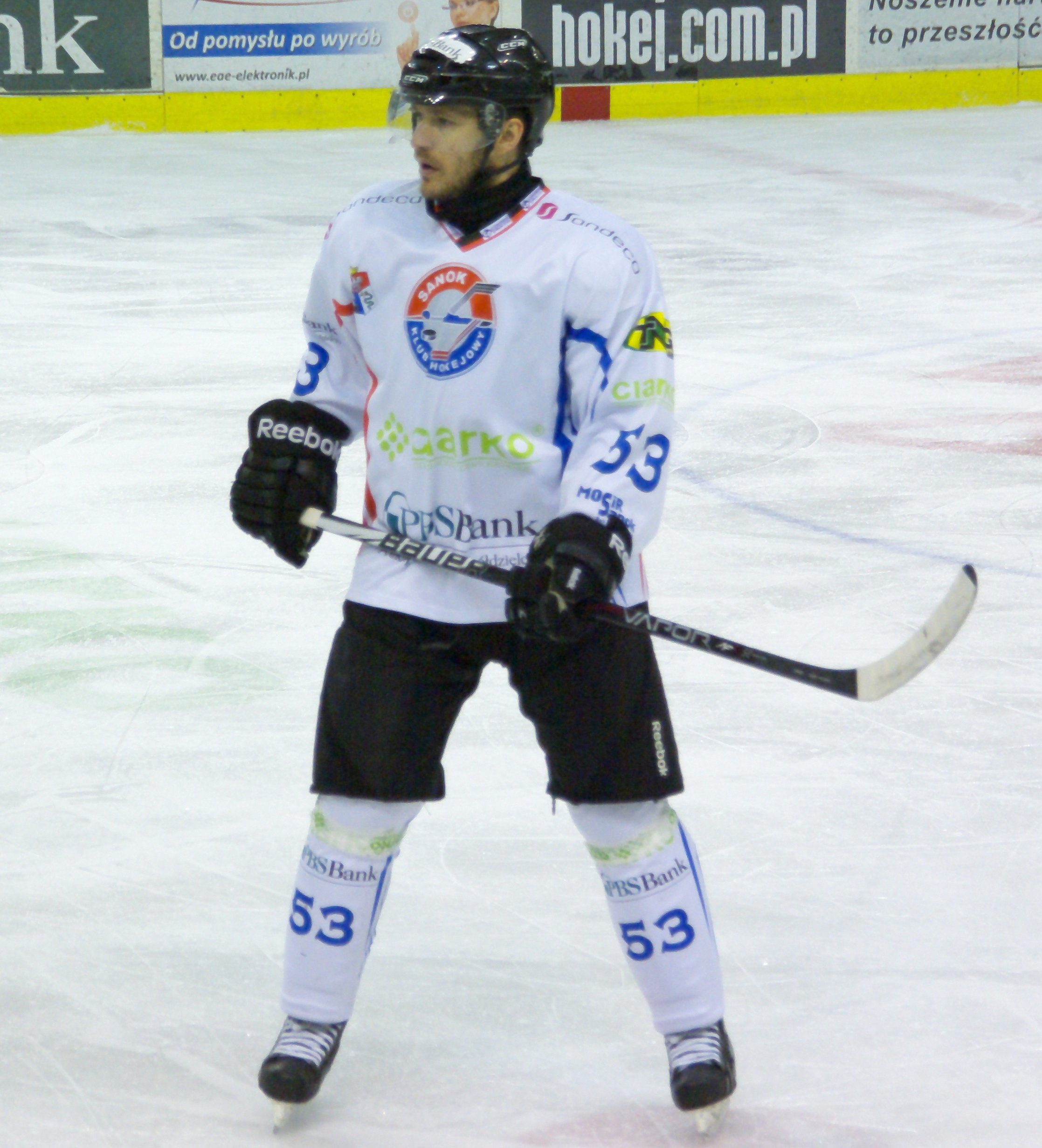
- Born: October 31, 1977 (age 47); Gottwaldov, Czechoslovakia
- Height: 5 ft 10 in (178 cm)
- Weight: 187 lb (85 kg; 13 st 5 lb)
- Position: Defence
- Shot: Left
- team Former teams: Free agent HC Zlín; HC Havířov Panthers; HC České Budějovice; HC Znojemští Orli; HC Vítkovice; HC Kometa Brno; KH Sanok; GKS Tychy
- NHL draft: Undrafted
- Playing career: 1996–2020

Pavel Mojžíš (born October 31, 1977) is a Czech professional ice hockey defenceman who is currently a free agent.

Mojžíš played in the Czech Extraliga for HC Kometa Brno, HC Continental Zlín, HC Havířov Panthers, HC České Budějovice, HC Kladno, HC Znojemští Orli and HC Vítkovice.

== Career statistics ==
| | | | Regular season | | | | | Playoffs |
| Season | Team | League | GP | G | A | Pts | PIM | GP | G | A | Pts | PIM |
|---|---|---|---|---|---|---|---|---|---|---|---|---|
| 1995–96 | HC Zlin U20 | Czech U20 | 39 | 6 | 17 | 23 | — | — | — | — | — | — |
| 1996–97 | HC Zlin U20 | Czech U20 | 43 | 17 | 20 | 37 | — | — | — | — | — | — |
| 1996–97 | AC Zlin | Czech | 2 | 0 | 0 | 0 | 0 | — | — | — | — | — |
| 1996–97 | HC Uherské Hradiště | Czech3 | 12 | 0 | 4 | 4 | — | — | — | — | — | — |
| 1997–98 | HC Zlin | Czech | 44 | 1 | 2 | 3 | 38 | — | — | — | — | — |
| 1997–98 | HC Znojemští Orli | Czech2 | 6 | 0 | 1 | 1 | — | — | — | — | — | — |
| 1998–99 | HC Zlin | Czech | 46 | 4 | 8 | 12 | 18 | 9 | 0 | 0 | 0 | 4 |
| 1998–99 | SK Horácká Slavia Třebíč | Czech2 | 1 | 0 | 1 | 1 | — | — | — | — | — | — |
| 1999–00 | HC Barum Continental | Czech | 40 | 5 | 9 | 14 | 50 | 2 | 0 | 1 | 1 | 2 |
| 2000–01 | HC Zlin | Czech | 11 | 2 | 0 | 2 | 8 | — | — | — | — | — |
| 2000–01 | HC Havířov | Czech | 11 | 0 | 0 | 0 | 4 | — | — | — | — | — |
| 2000–01 | HC České Budějovice | Czech | 14 | 1 | 1 | 2 | 8 | — | — | — | — | — |
| 2001–02 | HC Zlin | Czech | 43 | 4 | 6 | 10 | 24 | 6 | 0 | 2 | 2 | 4 |
| 2001–02 | HC Prostějov | Czech2 | 2 | 0 | 1 | 1 | 4 | — | — | — | — | — |
| 2002–03 | HC Hamé | Czech | 3 | 0 | 0 | 0 | 2 | — | — | — | — | — |
| 2002–03 | HC Kladno | Czech2 | 39 | 6 | 18 | 24 | 50 | 10 | 2 | 3 | 5 | 16 |
| 2003–04 | HC Znojemští Orli | Czech | 44 | 2 | 4 | 6 | 16 | 3 | 0 | 1 | 1 | 4 |
| 2004–05 | HC Znojemští Orli | Czech | 34 | 0 | 3 | 3 | 8 | — | — | — | — | — |
| 2004–05 | HC Vítkovice | Czech | 13 | 0 | 0 | 0 | 6 | 3 | 0 | 1 | 1 | 0 |
| 2005–06 | HC Znojemští Orli | Czech | 47 | 5 | 4 | 9 | 32 | 11 | 0 | 2 | 2 | 14 |
| 2006–07 | HC Znojemští Orli | Czech | 48 | 3 | 3 | 6 | 48 | 10 | 1 | 1 | 2 | 12 |
| 2007–08 | HC Znojemští Orli | Czech | 31 | 5 | 1 | 6 | 36 | 3 | 0 | 0 | 0 | 2 |
| 2007–08 | HC Olomouc | Czech2 | 1 | 0 | 1 | 1 | 0 | — | — | — | — | — |
| 2008–09 | HC Znojemští Orli | Czech | 52 | 8 | 8 | 16 | 54 | — | — | — | — | — |
| 2009–10 | HC Kometa Brno | Czech | 40 | 1 | 4 | 5 | 32 | — | — | — | — | — |
| 2009–10 | Orli Znojmo | Czech2 | 7 | 3 | 3 | 6 | 4 | — | — | — | — | — |
| 2010–11 | HC Kometa Brno | Czech | 52 | 5 | 9 | 14 | 34 | — | — | — | — | — |
| 2011–12 | KH Sanok | Poland | 41 | 16 | 25 | 41 | 30 | 9 | 2 | 7 | 9 | 10 |
| 2012–13 | KH Sanok | Poland | 37 | 17 | 15 | 32 | 30 | 9 | 2 | 6 | 8 | 2 |
| 2013–14 | GKS Tychy | Poland | 48 | 16 | 37 | 53 | 52 | 15 | 2 | 10 | 12 | 16 |
| 2014–15 | GKS Tychy | Poland | 45 | 8 | 19 | 27 | 22 | 8 | 0 | 1 | 1 | 4 |
| 2015–16 | LHK Jestřábi Prostějov | Czech2 | 51 | 3 | 12 | 15 | 58 | 4 | 0 | 0 | 0 | 2 |
| 2016–17 | VHK Vsetín | Czech3 | 40 | 5 | 28 | 33 | 28 | 11 | 2 | 10 | 12 | 6 |
| 2017–18 | SHK Hodonín | Czech3 | 34 | 7 | 20 | 27 | 38 | 5 | 0 | 2 | 2 | 6 |
| 2018–19 | HC Spartak Uherský Brod | Czech4 | — | — | — | — | — | — | — | — | — | — |
| 2018–19 | Draci Šumperk | Czech3 | 7 | 1 | 1 | 2 | 0 | 9 | 1 | 2 | 3 | 2 |
| 2019–20 | HC Spartak Uherský Brod | Czech4 | 25 | 2 | 14 | 16 | 48 | 2 | 0 | 0 | 0 | 34 |
| Czech totals | | | 575 | 46 | 62 | 108 | 418 | 47 | 1 | 8 | 9 | 42 |
| Czech2 totals | | | 107 | 12 | 37 | 49 | 116 | 14 | 2 | 3 | 5 | 18 |
| Poland totals | | | 171 | 57 | 96 | 153 | 134 | 41 | 6 | 24 | 30 | 32 |
