= 1994–95 Polska Liga Hokejowa season =

Polish ice hockey season

The 1994–95 Polska Liga Hokejowa season was the 60th season of the Polska Liga Hokejowa, the top level of ice hockey in Poland. 12 teams participated in the league, and Podhale Nowy Targ won the championship.

== Final round ==
	Club	GP	W	T	L	Goals	Pts
1.	Podhale Nowy Targ	22	19	3	0	137:49	41
2.	Unia Oświęcim	22	16	3	3	142:46	35
3.	KKH Katowice	22	17	0	5	140:45	34
4.	Naprzód Janów	22	13	3	6	113:61	29
5.	TTH Torun	22	12	3	7	103:79	26
6.	Polonia Bytom	22	11	1	10	75:94	23
7.	Tysovia Tychy	22	10	1	11	75:74	21
8.	Stoczniowiec Gdansk	22	8	4	10	90:95	20
9.	STS Sanok	22	8	2	12	72:96	18
10.	SMS Sosnowiec	22	3	1	18	51:127	7
11.	BTH Bydgoszcz	22	2	1	19	39:110	5
12.	KS Cracovia	22	1	2	19	60:219	4

== Playoffs ==
Quarter-finals
Podhale Nowy Targ	2
Tysovia Tychy	0
Naprzód Janów	2
TTH Torun	1
Unia Oświęcim	2
Stoczniowiec Gdansk	0
KKH Katowice	2
Polonia Bytom	0

Semi-finals
Podhale Nowy Targ	3
Naprzód Janów	0
Unia Oświęcim	3
KKH Katowice	2

Final
Podhale Nowy Targ	3
Unia Oświęcim	1
Third place
KKH Katowice	2
Naprzód Janów	1

== 9th-11th place ==
	Club	GP	W	T	L	Goals	Pts
9.	STS Sanok	4	4	0	0	27:6	8
10.	BTH Bydgoszcz	4	2	0	2	16:19	4
11.	KS Cracovia	4	0	0	4	11:29	0

== Relegation ==
- KS Cracovia - Znicz Pruszków 4:3/9:4
