= 2009–10 Polska Liga Hokejowa season =

- League: Polska Liga Hokejowa
- Sport: Ice hockey
- Duration: September 29 – March 22
- Number of teams: 10
- Total attendance: 230,690 (965 per game)

Regular season
- Regular-season winner: GKS Tychy
- Top scorer: Leszek Laszkiewicz (KS Cracovia) (75 points)
- Relegated to 1. Liga: TKH Toruń

Playoffs

Finals
- Champions: Podhale Nowy Targ
- Runners-up: KS Cracovia

Polska Liga Hokejowa seasons
- ← 2008–09 2010–11 →

The 2009–10 Polski Liga Hokejovwa season was the twelfth season of the Polska Liga Hokejowa and the 54th season of a Polish championship. Ten teams played 48 games with Podhale Nowy Targ defeated KS Cracovia in the final to win their 19th national championship.

== Regular season ==
	Club	GP	W	OTW	OTL	L	Goals	Pts
1.	GKS Tychy	18	12	2	1	3	70:41	41
2.	KS Cracovia	18	10	3	0	5	66:44	36
3.	Zagłębie Sosnowiec	18	10	2	1	5	86:70	35
4.	Podhale Nowy Targ	18	9	1	3	5	62:49	32
5.	JKH GKS Jastrzębie	18	9	0	1	8	62:52	28
6.	Naprzód Janów	18	9	0	0	9	52:75	27
7.	Stoczniowiec Gdańsk	18	8	1	0	9	69:66	26
8.	TKH Toruń	18	5	1	2	10	38:57	19
9.	Unia Oświęcim	18	6	0	0	12	62:80	18
10.	KH Sanok	18	2	0	2	14	47:82	8

== Final round ==
	Club	GP	W	OTW	OTL	L	Goals	Pts
1.	KS Cracovia	48	31	5	1	11	212:125	104
2.	GKS Tychy	48	28	5	1	14	174:124	95
3.	Podhale Nowy Targ	48	26	3	5	14	193:171	89
4.	Zagłębie Sosnowiec	48	21	3	4	20	213:187	73
5.	Naprzód Janów	48	16	3	2	27	144:220	56
6.	JKH GKS Jastrzębie	48	15	1	5	27	155:195	52

== Qualification round ==
	Club	GP	W	OTW	OTL	L	Goals	Pts
7.	Unia Oświęcim	24	16	2	0	6	103:57	52
8.	Stoczniowiec Gdańsk	24	15	2	1	6	107:78	50
9.	KH Sanok	24	13	2	2	7	97:57	45
10.	TKH Toruń	24	5	1	2	16	56:101	19
11.	KTH Krynica	24	3	1	3	17	60:130	14

== Playoffs ==
Quarter-finals
KS Cracovia	3
Stoczniowiec Gdańsk	0
Zagłębie Sosnowiec	3
Naprzód Janów	0
Podhale Nowy Targ	3
JKH GKS Jastrzębie	2
GKS Tychy	3
Unia Oświęcim	0

Semi-finals
KS Cracovia	4
Zagłębie Sosnowiec	0
Podhale Nowy Targ	4
GKS Tychy	3

Final
KS Cracovia	0
Podhale Nowy Targ	4

== Statistical leaders ==
=== Scoring leaders ===
GP = Games played; G = Goals; A = Assists; Pts = Points;; PIM = Penalty minutes

Player	Team	GP	G	A	Pts	PIM
Leszek Laszkiewicz	KS Cracovia	53	36	39	75	14
Vladimir Luka	Zagłębie Sosnowiec	49	38	34	72	48
Milan Baranyk	Podhale Nowy Targ	57	35	34	69	69
František Bakrlik	Podhale Nowy Targ	54	30	38	68	121
Martin Vozdecký	KH Sanok	38	28	36	64	80
Pavel Zdráhal	GKS Jastrzębie	51	16	48	64	20
Jiří Zdeněk	GKS Jastrzębie	49	31	31	62	32
Jarosław Rzeszutko	Stoczniowiec Gdańsk	48	29	31	60	30
Teddy Da Costa	Zagłębie Sosnowiec	43	34	25	59	140
Petr Lipina	GKS Jastrzębie	48	27	31	58	46

=== Leading goaltenders ===
GP = Games played; TOI = Time on ice (minutes); W = Wins; L = Losses; OT = Overtime/shootout losses; GA = Goals against; SO = Shutouts; Sv% = Save percentage; GAA = Goals against average

Player	Team	GP	TOI	W	L	OT	GA	SO	Sv%	GAA
Marek Rączka	KS Cracovia	28	1477	-	-	-	56	4	.920	2.27
Arkadiusz Sobecki	GKS Tychy	48	2847	-	-	-	113	2	.920	2.38
Wojtek Rocki	KH Sanok	34	1126	-	-	-	49	4	.910	2.61
Rafał Radziszewski	KS Cracovia	34	1947	-	-	-	97	2	.900	2.99
Zbigniew Szydłowski	Unia Oświęcim	41	2151	-	-	-	110	2	.910	3.07
Przemysław Odrobny	Stoczniowiec Gdańsk	36	1996	-	-	-	108	0	.910	3.25
Krzysztof Zborowski	Podhale Nowy Targ	59	3551	-	-	-	193	0	.910	3.26
Michał Plaskiewicz	TKH Toruń	46	2150	-	-	-	124	1	.910	3.46
Tomasz Rajski	Zagłębie Sosnowiec	36	2123	-	-	-	128	0	.900	3.62
Kamil Kosowski	JKH Czarne Jastrzębie	54	3216	-	-	-	203	1	.890	3.79
