= 1998–99 Polska Liga Hokejowa season =

Polish ice hockey season

The 1998–99 Polska Liga Hokejowa season was the 64th season of the Polska Liga Hokejowa, the top level of ice hockey in Poland. 14 teams participated in the league, and Unia Oswiecim won the championship.

== Final round ==
	Club	W	L	Goals	Pts
1.	Podhale Nowy Targ	39	7	281:120	78
2.	Unia Oświęcim	34	12	206:98	68
3.	SMS Warschau	33	13	254:101	66
4.	KTH Krynica	28	18	173:132	56
5.	KKH Katowice	27	19	175:128	54
6.	Stocznowiec Gdansk	19	27	151:180	38

== Qualification round ==
	Club	W	L	Goals	Pts
7.	STS Sanok	25	15	181:122	50
8.	TTS Tychy	23	17	187:170	46
9.	KS Cracovia	20	20	154:126	40
10.	Polonia Bytom	19	21	136:141	38
11.	TTH Torun	15	25	149:171	30
12.	Zagłębie Sosnowiec	9	31	132:227	18
13.	SMS Sosnowiec	5	35	66:298	10
14.	BTH Bydgoszcz	2	38	82:313	4

== Playoffs ==
Quarter-finals
Unia Oświęcim	3
STS Sanok	0
SMS Warschau	1
Stocznowiec Gdansk	3
Podhale Nowy Targ	3
TTS Tychy	0
KTH Krynica	3
KKH Katowice	2

Semi-finals
Unia Oświęcim	3
Stocznowiec Gdansk	0
Podhale Nowy Targ	2
KTH Krynica	3

Final
Unia Oświęcim	4
KTH Krynica	0
Third place
Podhale Nowy Targ	3
Stocznowiec Gdansk	0
