= 1992–93 Polska Liga Hokejowa season =

Polish ice hockey season

The 1992–93 Polska Liga Hokejowa season was the 58th season of the Polska Liga Hokejowa, the top level of ice hockey in Poland. 10 teams participated in the league, and Podhale Nowy Targ won the championship.

== First round ==
	Club	GP	W	T	L	Goals	Pts
1.	Unia Oświęcim	18	15	2	1	130:43	32
2.	Polonia Bytom	18	12	3	3	80:40	27
3.	Podhale Nowy Targ	18	12	2	4	97:42	26
4.	Naprzód Janów	18	12	0	6	80:58	24
5.	GKS Katowice	18	9	1	8	77:74	19
6.	STS Sanok	18	9	0	9	52:58	18
7.	GKS Tychy	18	8	1	9	60:56	17
8.	Towimor Torun	18	5	0	13	61:86	10
9.	KS Cracovia	18	3	1	14	43:106	7
10.	Stoczniowiec Gdansk	18	0	0	18	27:144	0

== Final round ==
	Club	GP	W	T	L	Goals	Pts
1.	Unia Oświęcim	28	20	4	4	173:85	44
2.	Podhale Nowy Targ	28	19	4	5	148:66	42
3.	Polonia Bytom	28	17	5	6	118:71	39
4.	Naprzód Janów	28	16	3	9	111:90	35
5.	STS Sanok	28	11	1	16	78:96	23
6.	GKS Katowice	28	10	3	15	107:126	23

== Qualification round ==
	Club	GP	W	T	L	Goals	Pts
7.	GKS Tychy	24	10	4	10	86:75	24
8.	Towimor Torun	24	8	1	15	83:104	17
9.	KS Cracovia	24	8	1	15	76:122	17
10.	Stoczniowiec Gdansk	24	0	0	24	37:184	0

== Playoffs ==
Quarter-finals
Unia Oświęcim	2
Towimor Torun	1
Naprzód Janów	2
STS Sanok	0
Podhale Nowy Targ	2
GKS Tychy	1
Polonia Bytom	2
GKS Katowice	1

Semi-finals
Unia Oświęcim	3
Naprzód Janów	0
Podhale Nowy Targ	3
Polonia Bytom	0

Final
Unia Oświęcim	1
Podhale Nowy Targ	3
Third place
Polonia Bytom	3
Naprzód Janów	1

== Relegation ==
- Stocznowiec Gdansk - Mosir Sosnowiec 2:2/3:2
