= Roman Šimíček =

Czech ice hockey player

- Born: November 4, 1971 (age 55) Ostrava, Czechoslovakia
- Height: 6 ft 3 in (191 cm)
- Weight: 216 lb (98 kg; 15 st 6 lb)
- Position: Centre
- Shot: Left
- Played for: HC Vitkovice; HPK; Pittsburgh Penguins; Minnesota Wild; HIFK; HC Sparta Praha; HC Dukla Trenčín; GKS Tychy
- National team: Czech Republic
- NHL draft: 273rd overall, 2000; Pittsburgh Penguins
- Playing career: 1990–2013

Roman Šimíček (born November 4, 1971) is a Czech former professional ice hockey centre. He played in the National Hockey League with the Pittsburgh Penguins and the Minnesota Wild.

== Career ==
=== Playing career ===
Šimíček was drafted in the ninth round, 273rd overall, by the Pittsburgh Penguins in the 2000 NHL entry draft. He played 29 National Hockey League games with the Penguins in the 2000–01 season before he was traded to the Minnesota Wild in exchange for Steve McKenna. He appeared in 34 more NHL games with the Wild during the 2000–01 and 2001–02 season. Šimíček has played in the Czech Republic with HC Vitkovice, before signed with HC Dukla Trenčín on 2 June 2009.

On August 11, 2010, Simicek signed a one-year contract with GKS Tychy of the Polska Liga Hokejowa. After three seasons, Simicek announced his retirement from playing and accepted an assistant coaching position with Vitkovice.

=== Coaching career ===
Šimíček signed a coaching contract with Orli Znojmo in December 2016.

== Career statistics ==
=== Regular season and playoffs ===
			Regular season					Playoffs
Season	Team	League	GP	G	A	Pts	PIM	GP	G	A	Pts	PIM
1989–90	TJ Vítkovice	TCH	5	3	3	6	2	—	—	—	—	—
1990–91	TJ Vítkovice	TCH	35	2	4	6	16	—	—	—	—	—
1991–92	TJ Vítkovice	TCH	33	6	9	15	—	—	—	—	—	—
1992–93	TJ Vítkovice	TCH	38	8	15	23	52	—	—	—	—	—
1993–94	HC Vítkovice	ELH	40	18	16	34	66	5	0	2	2	2
1994–95	HC Vítkovice	ELH	41	11	15	26	104	—	—	—	—	—
1995–96	HC Vítkovice	ELH	38	8	11	19	38	4	2	0	2	8
1996–97	HC Vítkovice	ELH	49	18	19	37	44	9	4	4	8	12
1997–98	HC Vítkovice	ELH	40	16	27	43	52	9	2	4	6	6
1998–99	HPK	SM-liiga	49	24	27	51	75	8	2	5	7	18
1999–2000	HPK	SM-liiga	23	10	17	27	50	8	2	4	6	10
2000–01	Pittsburgh Penguins	NHL	29	3	6	9	30	—	—	—	—	—
2000–01	Minnesota Wild	NHL	28	2	4	6	21	—	—	—	—	—
2001–02	Minnesota Wild	NHL	6	2	0	2	8	—	—	—	—	—
2001–02	Houston Aeros	AHL	49	12	14	26	61	4	1	0	1	2
2002–03	HIFK	SM-liiga	30	4	11	15	49	—	—	—	—	—
2002–03	HC Sparta Praha	ELH	11	3	5	8	14	10	2	8	10	10
2003–04	HC Sparta Praha	ELH	36	6	13	19	85	13	2	4	6	12
2004–05	HC Vítkovice	ELH	45	8	18	26	101	10	2	1	3	41
2005–06	HC Vítkovice Steel	ELH	39	10	15	25	52	6	0	3	3	6
2006–07	HC Vítkovice Steel	ELH	30	2	7	9	32	—	—	—	—	—
2007–08	HC Vítkovice Steel	ELH	42	7	8	15	68	—	—	—	—	—
2008–09	HC Vítkovice Steel	ELH	44	9	12	21	44	5	0	1	1	2
2009–10	Dukla Trenčín	SVK	37	9	19	28	54	—	—	—	—	—
2010–11	GKS Tychy	POL	32	18	20	38	58	13	5	7	12	37
2011–12	GKS Tychy	POL	20	7	6	13	24	—	—	—	—	—
2012–13	GKS Tychy	POL	37	10	28	38	56	12	2	4	6	22
TCH totals			111	19	31	50	70	—	—	—	—	—
NHL totals			63	7	10	17	59	—	—	—	—	—
ELH totals			455	116	166	282	700	71	14	27	41	99

=== International ===
Year	Team	Event	GP	G	A	Pts	PIM
1997	Czech Republic	WC	9	1	0	1	6
1999	Czech Republic	WC	10	1	6	7	26
Senior totals			19	2	6	8	32
