= 1976–77 Polska Liga Hokejowa season =

Polish ice hockey season

The 1976–77 Polska Liga Hokejowa season was the 42nd season of the Polska Liga Hokejowa, the top level of ice hockey in Poland. 12 teams participated in the league, and Podhale Nowy Targ won the championship.

== Regular season ==
	Club	GP	Goals	Pts
1.	Podhale Nowy Targ	44	312:128	75
2.	Naprzód Janów	44	220:136	62
3.	Baildon Katowice	44	284:164	62
4.	ŁKS Łódź	44	231:137	61
5.	GKS Katowice	44	156:126	53
6.	Stoczniowiec Gdansk	44	189:162	49
7.	GKS Tychy	44	153:183	39
8.	Zagłębie Sosnowiec	44	136:154	36
9.	Polonia Bydgoszcz	44	141:212	34
10.	Legia Warszawa	44	154:211	26
11.	Stal Sanok	44	121:305	16
12.	KS Pomorzanin Toruń	44	122:311	15
