= 2006–07 Polska Liga Hokejowa season =

Polish ice hockey season

The 2006–07 Polska Liga Hokejowa season was the 72nd season of the Polska Liga Hokejowa, the top level of ice hockey in Poland. 10 teams participated in the league, and Podhale Nowy Targ won the championship.

== First round ==
	Club	GP	W	OTW	T	OTL	L	Goals	Pts
1.	GKS Tychy	18	12	1	3	0	2	89:40	41
2.	Stoczniowiec Gdansk	18	11	0	3	0	4	82:45	36
3.	KS Cracovia	18	9	2	3	0	5	78:52	33
4.	Podhale Nowy Targ	18	10	0	1	0	5	75:47	33
5.	Zaglebie Sosnowiec	18	8	0	1	2	7	59:56	27
6.	THK Torun	18	7	2	1	1	7	55:57	27
7.	Naprzód Janów	18	6	1	0	2	9	55:68	22
8.	KTH Krynica	18	5	0	3	1	9	34:66	19
9.	Unia Oświęcim	18	5	0	0	1	12	52:70	16
10.	KH Sanok	18	1	2	2	0	14	36:114	9

== Final round ==
	Club	GP	W	OTW	T	OTL	L	Goals	Pts
1.	KS Cracovia	38	21	3	3	0	11	140:94	72
2.	GKS Tychy	38	19	1	1	4	10	152:100	67
3.	Stoczniowiec Gdansk	38	18	2	4	1	13	147:120	63
4.	Podhale Nowy Targ	38	18	1	5	1	13	140:103	62
5.	Zaglebie Sosnowiec	38	17	0	3	3	15	109:109	57
6.	THK Torun	38	14	4	1	1	18	110:131	52

== Qualification round ==
	Club	GP	W	OTW	T	OTL	L	Goals	Pts
7.	Unia Oświęcim	36	18	1	1	1	15	127:109	58
8.	Naprzód Janów	36	14	2	1	2	17	116:132	49
9.	KTH Krynica	36	11	2	4	4	15	96:130	45
10.	KH Sanok	36	4	3	0	2	27	81:195	20

== Playoffs ==
Quarter-finals
GKS Tychy	3
Unia Oświęcim	0
Stocznowiec Gdansk	3
THK Torun	2
KS Cracovia	3
Naprzód Janów	0
Podhale Nowy Targ	3
Zaglebie Sosnowiec	0

Semi-finals
GKS Tychy	4
Stocznowiec Gdansk	3
KS Cracovia	3
Podhale Nowy Targ	4

Final
GKS Tychy	1
Podhale Nowy Targ	4
Third place
KS Cracovia	3
Stoczniowiec Gdansk	1

== Relegation ==
- KTH Krynica - KH Sanok 1:4 (4:5 SO, 0:5, 3:5, 3:1, 1:3)
