= 1975–76 Polska Liga Hokejowa season =

Polish ice hockey season

The 1975–76 Polska Liga Hokejowa season was the 41st season of the Polska Liga Hokejowa, the top level of ice hockey in Poland. Four teams participated in the league, and Podhale Nowy Targ won the championship.

== Regular season ==
	Club	GP	Goals	Pts
1.	Podhale Nowy Targ	18	74:59	25
2.	Baildon Katowice	18	78:67	19
3.	Naprzód Janów	18	50:59	17
4.	ŁKS Łódź	18	46:63	10
