= 1981–82 Polska Liga Hokejowa season =

Polish ice hockey season

The 1981–82 Polska Liga Hokejowa season was the 47th season of the Polska Liga Hokejowa, the top level of ice hockey in Poland. 10 teams participated in the league, and Zaglebie Sosnowiec won the championship.

== Regular season ==
	Club	GP	W	T	L	Goals	Pts
1.	Zagłębie Sosnowiec	36	30	3	3	237:88	63
2.	Podhale Nowy Targ	36	26	2	8	222:102	54
3.	Naprzód Janów	36	22	7	7	172:104	51
4.	Polonia Bytom	36	18	3	15	128:129	39
5.	ŁKS Łódź	36	15	3	18	111:154	33
6.	GKS Katowice	36	11	7	18	121:138	29
7.	GKS Tychy	36	12	4	20	167:192	28
8.	Baildon Katowice	36	11	4	21	135:211	26
9.	BKS Bydgoszcz	36	10	5	21	117:153	25
10.	KS Cracovia	36	5	2	29	103:252	12
