= Samson Mahbod =

Canadian-American ice hockey player

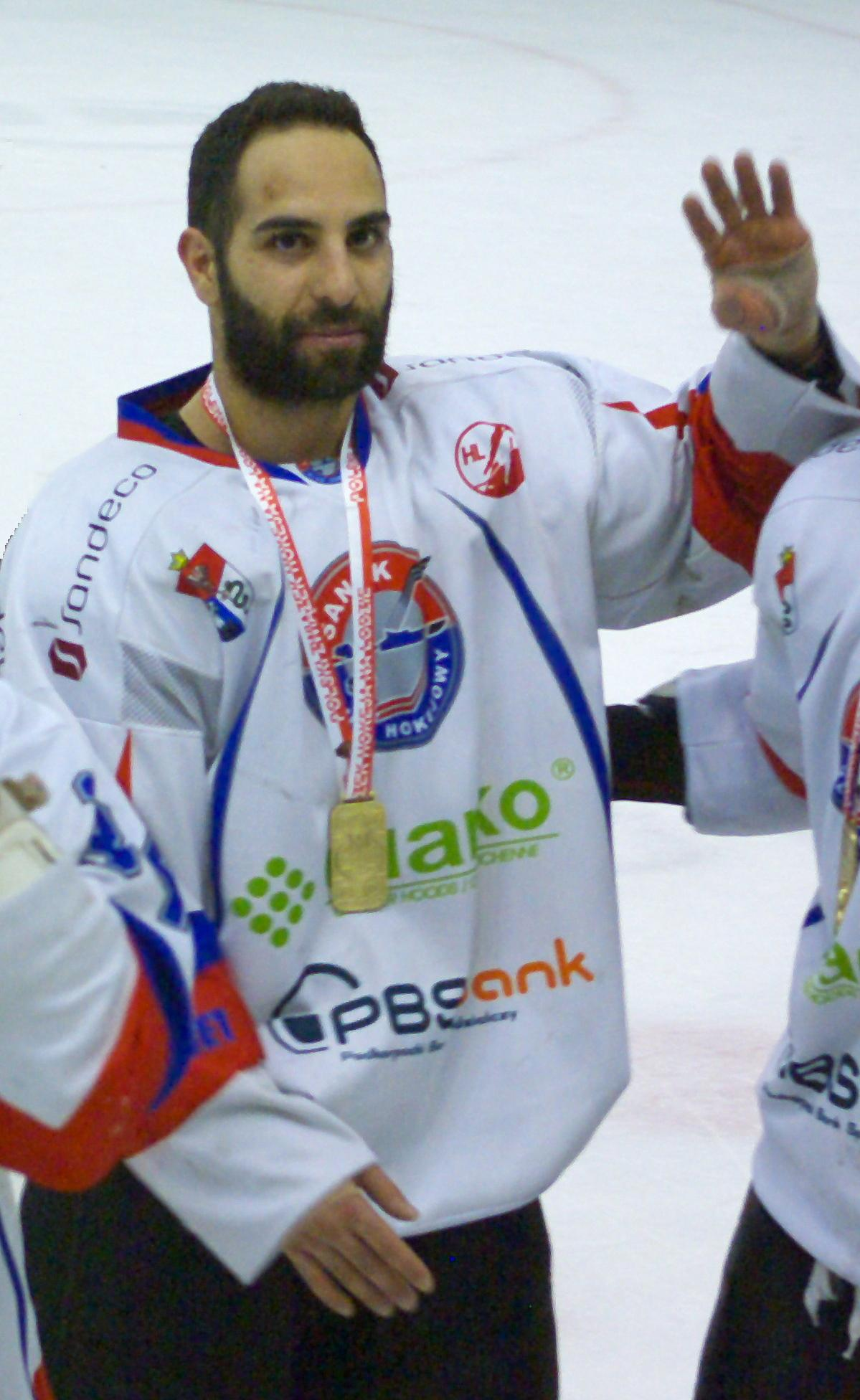
- Born: February 3, 1989 (age 36) Montreal, Quebec, Canada
- Height: 5 ft 9 in (175 cm)
- Weight: 170 lb (77 kg; 12 st 2 lb)
- Position: Right wing
- Shoots: Right
- team Former teams: Free agent Cincinnati Cyclones; Utah Grizzlies; Arizona Sundogs; Alaska Aces; GKS Katowice; KH Sanok; Toros Neftekamsk; Espoo Blues; KHL Medveščak Zagreb; HC Vítkovice; Krefeld Pinguine; HC Litvínov; HK Dukla Trenčín; Asiago Hockey; HC Slovan Bratislava
- NHL draft: Undrafted
- Playing career: 2010–present

Samson Mahbod (born February 3, 1989) is a Canadian-American professional ice hockey winger of Iranian descent. He is currently a free agent.

== Playing career ==
=== Junior ===
Mahbod was drafted in the 2005 QMJHL Entry Draft by the Gatineau Olympiques, in the 5th round (75th overall). He also played for the Acadie-Bathurst Titan, Drummondville Voltigeurs, and the Prince Edward Island Rocket.

=== Professional ===
He was not drafted into the NHL, so he made his jump to professional hockey by joining the Elmira Jackals in the 2010–11 ECHL season. That season, he also played for the South Carolina Stingrays, Cincinnati Cyclones, and Utah Grizzlies. The following season, he played for the Arizona Sundogs of the Central Hockey League, before moving back to the ECHL in 2012 with the Alaska Aces. After a short stay in Alaska, he decided to try his luck abroad and joined GKS Katowice for one game.

In 2013, he signed a one-year contract with Ciarko PBS Bank KH Sanok. In addition to winning the playoff championship with the team, he led the league in assists (54) and points (81) and was named the Polish League's Best Player.

In August 2014, he joined Russian club, Toros Neftekamsk of the VHL, where he won the VHL Championship.

In August 2015, he underwent a successful trial with the Espoo Blues of Liiga, and signed a one-year contract. Upon the conclusion of the 2015–16 season, he moved on to the KHL, signing with Medvescak Zagreb in July 2016.

During the 2018–19 season, Mahbod played in 8 games with HC Vítkovice Ridera before leaving the Czech Extraliga in agreeing to a contract for the remainder of the season with German outfit, Krefeld Pinguine of the DEL on November 30, 2018. Mahbob contributed with 6 assists in 16 games with the Pinguine before leaving at the conclusion of the year.

== Career statistics ==
			Regular season					Playoffs
Season	Team	League	GP	G	A	Pts	PIM	GP	G	A	Pts	PIM
2005–06	Gatineau Olympiques	QMJHL	5	0	0	0	2	—	—	—	—	—
2006–07	Acadie-Bathurst Titan	QMJHL	9	1	1	2	6	—	—	—	—	—
2007–08	Drummondville Voltigeurs	QMJHL	32	6	17	23	29	—	—	—	—	—
2008–09	Drummondville Voltigeurs	QMJHL	66	30	49	79	64	19	5	8	13	20
2009–10	Prince Edward Island Rocket	QMJHL	52	20	44	64	53	5	0	5	5	10
2010–11	Elmira Jackals	ECHL	9	2	4	6	8	—	—	—	—	—
2010–11	South Carolina Stingrays	ECHL	16	3	7	10	12	—	—	—	—	—
2010–11	Cincinnati Cyclones	ECHL	22	5	5	10	17	—	—	—	—	—
2010–11	Utah Grizzlies	ECHL	—	—	—	—	—	6	1	0	1	0
2011–12	Arizona Sundogs	CHL	43	7	15	22	45	—	—	—	—	—
2012–13	Alaska Aces	ECHL	4	0	2	2	2	—	—	—	—	—
2012–13	GKS Katowice	Poland	1	1	2	3	0	7	5	2	7	18
2013–14	KH Sanok	Poland	39	27	54	81	42	14	9	14	23	8
2014–15	Toros Neftekamsk	VHL	37	8	17	25	95	20	7	6	13	10
2015–16	Espoo Blues	Liiga	57	8	14	22	55	—	—	—	—	—
2016–17	KHL Medveščak Zagreb	KHL	30	2	6	8	14	—	—	—	—	—
2017–18	KHL Medveščak Zagreb	EBEL	37	15	22	37	16	—	—	—	—	—
2017–18	HC Vítkovice	ELH	4	0	0	0	4	4	0	0	0	8
2018–19	HC Vítkovice	ELH	8	1	0	1	10	—	—	—	—	—
2018–19	Krefeld Pinguine	DEL	16	0	6	6	20	—	—	—	—	—
2019–20	HC Litvínov	ELH	29	9	13	22	24	—	—	—	—	—
2020–21	HC Litvínov	ELH	9	0	1	1	4	—	—	—	—	—
2021–22	HK Dukla Trenčín	Slovak	20	8	11	19	22	4	0	2	2	20
2022	Team Carbonneau	3ICE	14	8	7	15	—	—	—	—	—	—
2022–23	Asiago Hockey 1935	ICEHL	6	3	4	7	6	2	0	0	0	2
2023	Team Carbonneau	3ICE	6	3	7	10	—	—	—	—	—	—
KHL totals			30	2	6	8	14	—	—	—	—	—
