= Martin Bouz =

Czech ice hockey forward

- Born: 3 November 1979 (age 47)
- Height: 6 ft 2 in (188 cm)
- Weight: 198 lb (90 kg; 14 st 2 lb)
- Position: Forward
- Shot: Right
- Played for: HC Oceláři Třinec; Naprzód Janów; TKH Toruń
- Playing career: 1999–2018

Martin Bouz (born 3 November 1979) is a Czech former professional ice hockey forward.

Bouz played six gamed for HC Oceláři Třinec during the 2004–05 Czech Extraliga season, scoring one goal. He also played in the English Premier Ice Hockey League for the Guildford Flames and the Polska Hokej Liga for Naprzód Janów and TKH Toruń.
