= Pavel Zdráhal =

Czech ice hockey right winger

- Born: July 20, 1971 (age 53); Ostrava, Czechoslovakia
- Height: 6 ft 3 in (191 cm)
- Weight: 212 lb (96 kg; 15 st 2 lb)
- Position: Right wing
- Shot: Right
- Played for: HC Vítkovice; ASD Dukla Jihlava; HC Slezan Opava; HC Havířov; HC Zlín; HC Litvínov; HC Oceláři Třinec; Anglet Hormadi Élite; VHK Vsetín; HC Sparta Praha; JKH GKS Jastrzębie; Ours de Villard-de-Lans
- Playing career: 1988–2012

Pavel Zdráhal (born July 20, 1971) is a Czech former professional ice hockey right winger. He is currently the general manager and assistant coach of AZ Havířov of the 1st Czech Republic Hockey League.

Zdráhal played in the Czech Extraliga for HC Vítkovice, ASD Dukla Jihlava, HC Slezan Opava, HC Havířov, HC Zlín, HC Litvínov, HC Oceláři Třinec, VHK Vsetín and HC Sparta Praha. He also played in the Ligue Magnus for Anglet Hormadi Élite and Ours de Villard-de-Lans and in the Polska Hokej Liga for JKH GKS Jastrzębie.

His son Patrik Zdráhal currently plays for HC Verva Litvínov.

== Career statistics ==
			Regular season					Playoffs
Season	Team	League	GP	G	A	Pts	PIM	GP	G	A	Pts	PIM
1988–89	TJ Vitkovice	Czechoslovak	1	0	0	0	0	—	—	—	—	—
1989–90	TJ Vitkovice	Czechoslovak	6	1	3	4	—	—	—	—	—	—
1990–91	TJ Vitkovice	Czechoslovak	25	6	5	11	8	—	—	—	—	—
1991–92	TJ Vitkovice	Czechoslovak	27	5	4	9	—	7	3	2	5	—
1992–93	ASD Dukla Jihlava	Czechoslovak	2	0	0	0	—	—	—	—	—	—
1992–93	TJ Vodní stavby Tábor	Czech3	41	12	9	21	—	—	—	—	—	—
1993–94	HC Vítkovice	Czech	36	6	7	13	10	3	1	2	3	0
1993–94	HC Havířov	Czech2	7	3	1	4	—	—	—	—	—	—
1994–95	HC Vítkovice	Czech	5	0	0	0	0	—	—	—	—	—
1995–96	HC Vítkovice	Czech	8	1	1	2	2	—	—	—	—	—
1995–96	HC Havířov	Czech2	24	3	3	6	—	—	—	—	—	—
1996–97	SK Karvina	Czech2	52	20	18	38	—	—	—	—	—	—
1997–98	HC MBL Olomouc	Czech2	50	17	16	33	—	—	—	—	—	—
1998–99	HC Slezan Opava	Czech	21	4	3	7	12	—	—	—	—	—
1998–99	TJ Nový Jičín	Czech3	—	—	—	—	—	—	—	—	—	—
1998–99	HC Papíroví Draci Šumperk	Czech3	25	20	19	39	—	—	—	—	—	—
1999–00	HC Havířov	Czech	52	16	16	32	26	—	—	—	—	—
2000–01	HC Havířov	Czech	32	10	9	19	12	—	—	—	—	—
2000–01	HC Zlín	Czech	12	2	6	8	4	6	1	1	2	4
2001–02	HC Havířov Panthers	Czech	20	7	8	15	10	—	—	—	—	—
2001–02	HC Chemopetrol	Czech	6	0	0	0	8	—	—	—	—	—
2001–02	HC Oceláři Třinec	Czech	22	3	10	13	14	5	0	1	1	0
2002–03	HC Oceláři Třinec	Czech	1	0	0	0	0	—	—	—	—	—
2002–03	HC Dukla Jihlava	Czech2	31	6	10	16	20	9	5	3	8	10
2003–04	HC Vítkovice	Czech	2	0	1	1	2	—	—	—	—	—
2003–04	HC Havířov Panthers	Czech2	26	12	18	30	80	—	—	—	—	—
2003–04	HC Slovan Ústečtí Lvi	Czech2	9	2	3	5	6	8	1	1	2	10
2004–05	Anglet Hormadi Élite	Ligue Magnus	28	17	16	33	30	4	0	1	1	2
2005–06	Vsetínská hokejová	Czech	15	2	6	8	10	—	—	—	—	—
2005–06	HC Havířov Panthers	Czech2	45	15	25	40	34	7	1	4	5	8
2006–07	HC Vítkovice	Czech	1	0	0	0	2	—	—	—	—	—
2006–07	HC Sparta Praha	Czech	2	0	0	0	0	—	—	—	—	—
2006–07	HC Havířov Panthers	Czech2	11	2	1	3	8	—	—	—	—	—
2006–07	BK Mladá Boleslav	Czech2	37	7	14	21	40	5	0	1	1	2
2007–08	HC Vítkovice	Czech	3	1	1	2	0	—	—	—	—	—
2007–08	HC Havířov Panthers	Czech2	43	11	27	38	66	4	0	4	4	4
2008–09	JKH GKS Jastrzebie	Poland	31	21	15	36	26	—	—	—	—	—
2009–10	JKH GKS Jastrzebie	Poland	49	16	46	62	20	—	—	—	—	—
2010–11	Ours de Villard-de-Lans	Ligue Magnus	7	2	2	4	6	—	—	—	—	—
2010–11	IHC Písek	Czech2	17	3	9	12	12	—	—	—	—	—
2011–12	HC Poruba 2011	Czech3	34	9	13	22	24	—	—	—	—	—
Czech totals			238	52	68	120	112	14	2	4	6	4
Czech2 totals			352	101	145	246	266	33	7	13	20	34
