= Martin Richter =

Czech ice hockey player

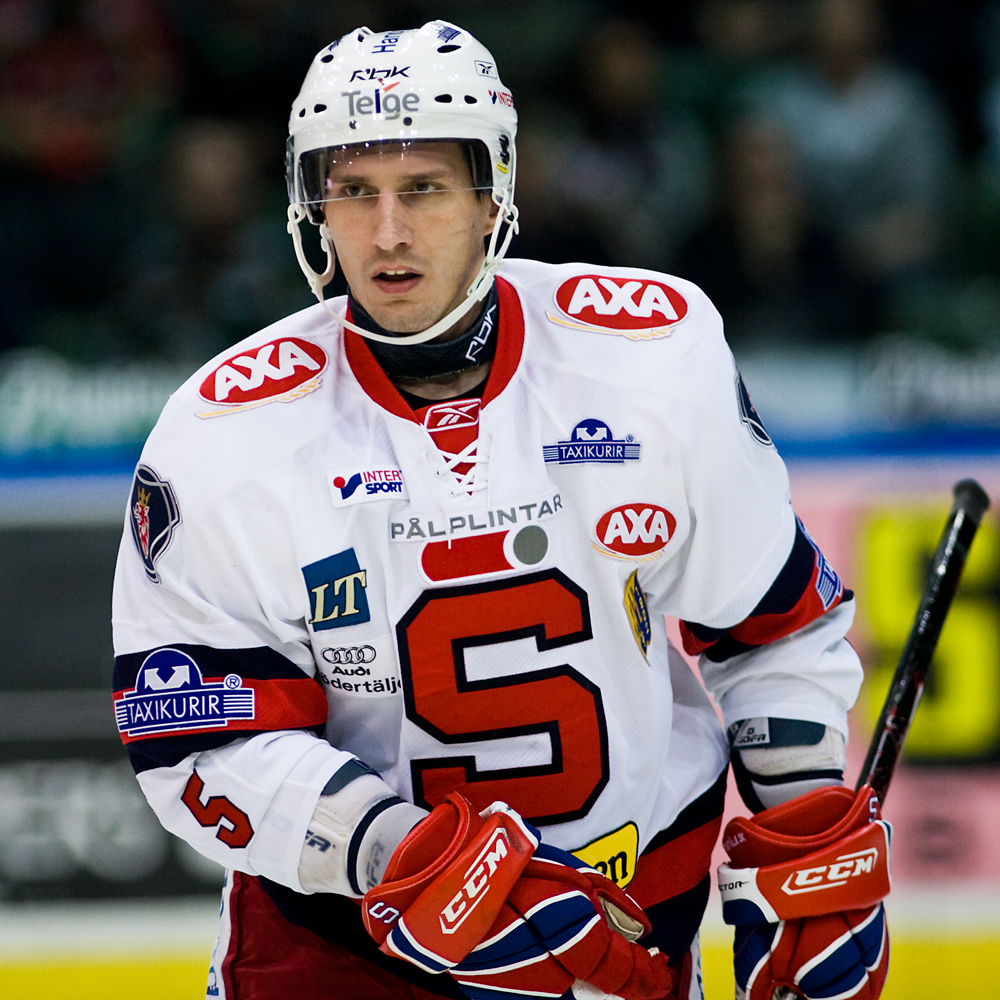
- Born: December 6, 1977 (age 48) Prostějov, Czechoslovakia
- Height: 6 ft 0 in (183 cm)
- Weight: 198 lb (90 kg; 14 st 2 lb)
- Position: Defence
- Shot: Right
- Played for: HC Olomouc (CZE); HC Karlovy Vary (CZE); SaiPa (SM-liiga); Hartford Wolf Pack (AHL); HC Sparta Praha (CZE); HC CSKA Moscow (RSL); HC Liberec (CZE); HC Pardubice (CZE); Södertälje SK (Elitserien); HC ’05 Banská Bystrica (SVK); HC Kometa Brno (CZE); HC Oceláři Třinec (CZE); Ciarko PBS Bank KH Sanok (POL)
- NHL draft: 269th overall, 2000; New York Rangers
- Playing career: 1996–2015

Martin Richter (born December 6, 1977) is a Czech former professional ice hockey defenceman, who last played for Ciarko PBS Bank KH Sanok in the Polska Hokej Liga. Richter was drafted by the New York Rangers but never appeared in an NHL game.

== Career statistics ==
=== Regular season and playoffs ===
			Regular season					Playoffs
Season	Team	League	GP	G	A	Pts	PIM	GP	G	A	Pts	PIM
1995–96	HC Olomouc	CZE U20	41	9	9	18		—	—	—	—	—
1995–96	HC Olomouc	ELH	3	0	0	0	0	1	0	0	0	0
1996–97	HC Olomouc	ELH	26	1	0	1	26	—	—	—	—	—
1996–97	HC Papíroví Draci Šumperk	CZE.3		0	0	0		—	—	—	—	—
1997–98	HC Becherovka Karlovy Vary	ELH	41	1	2	3	30	—	—	—	—	—
1998–99	HC Becherovka Karlovy Vary	ELH	41	3	6	9	34	—	—	—	—	—
1999–2000	HC Becherovka Karlovy Vary	ELH	24	0	5	5	18	—	—	—	—	—
1999–2000	SaiPa	SM-liiga	26	1	3	4	54	—	—	—	—	—
2000–01	SaiPa	SM-liiga	41	4	5	9	80	—	—	—	—	—
2000–01	Hartford Wolf Pack	AHL	1	0	0	0	0	—	—	—	—	—
2001–02	Hartford Wolf Pack	AHL	29	1	1	2	36	—	—	—	—	—
2001–02	HC Sparta Praha	ELH	8	0	0	0	14	13	0	0	0	10
2002–03	HC Sparta Praha	ELH	34	2	7	9	58	8	0	0	0	10
2003–04	CSKA Moscow	RSL	14	0	0	0	33	—	—	—	—	—
2003–04	HC Sparta Praha	ELH	16	2	2	4	16	—	—	—	—	—
2004–05	HC Sparta Praha	ELH	44	4	9	13	32	5	1	1	2	4
2005–06	Bílí Tygři Liberec	ELH	47	6	20	26	64	5	0	1	1	8
2006–07	Hartford Wolf Pack	AHL	52	2	6	8	46	—	—	—	—	—
2007–08	HC Moeller Pardubice	ELH	17	0	1	1	6	—	—	—	—	—
2007–08	Södertälje SK	SEL	29	0	1	1	30	—	—	—	—	—
2008–09	HC ’05 Banská Bystrica	SVK	12	0	4	4	20	—	—	—	—	—
2008–09	Södertälje SK	SEL	38	2	0	2	36	—	—	—	—	—
2009–10	HC Eaton Pardubice	ELH	7	0	3	3	8	—	—	—	—	—
2009–10	HC Kometa Brno	ELH	30	0	0	0	26	—	—	—	—	—
2010–11	HC Kometa Brno	ELH	11	0	0	0	22	—	—	—	—	—
2010–11	HC Oceláři Třinec	ELH	31	1	0	1	32	16	0	0	0	12
2011–12	HC Oceláři Třinec	ELH	51	2	2	4	40	5	0	1	1	2
2012–13	HC ’05 Banská Bystrica	SVK	33	1	6	7	28	5	0	0	0	6
2013–14	Ciarko PBS Bank KH Sanok	POL	46	8	28	36	102	14	0	8	8	2
2014–15	Ciarko PBS Bank KH Sanok	POL	39	3	11	14	49	8	0	2	2	2
ELH totals			431	22	57	79	426	53	1	3	4	46

=== International ===
Year	Team	Event	GP	G	A	Pts	PIM
1997	Czech Republic	WJC	7	0	0	0	8
2001	Czech Republic	WC	9	0	0	0	0
2002	Czech Republic	WC	6	0	0	0	0
2003	Czech Republic	WC	9	0	1	1	24
2006	Czech Republic	WC	8	0	2	2	8
Senior totals			32	0	3	3	32
