= 2010–11 Polska Liga Hokejowa season =

- League: Polska Liga Hokejowa
- Sport: Ice hockey
- Number of teams: 10

Regular season
- Regular-season winner: KS Cracovia
- Relegated to 1. Liga: KTH Krynica

Playoffs

Finals
- Champions: KS Cracovia
- Runners-up: GKS Tychy

Polska Liga Hokejowa seasons
- ← 2009–10 2011–12 →

The 2010–11 Polska Liga Hokejowa season was the 76th season of the Polska Liga Hokejowa, the top level of ice hockey in Poland. 10 teams participated in the league, and KS Cracovia won the championship.

== Regular season ==
	Club	GP	W	OTW	SOW	SOL	OTL	L	Goals	Pts
1.	KS Cracovia	36	26	1	3	0	0	6	178:83	86
2.	GKS Tychy	36	23	1	1	3	2	6	152:87	78
3.	Unia Oświęcim	36	23	1	0	3	0	9	158:90	74
4.	JKH GKS Jastrzębie	36	20	1	1	1	1	12	167:99	66
5.	KH Sanok	36	19	1	1	0	0	15	139:116	61
6.	Stoczniowiec Gdansk	36	15	0	1	1	3	16	131:143	51
7.	Podhale Nowy Targ	36	13	1	1	1	1	19	117:159	45
8.	Zaglebie Sosnowiec	36	11	0	1	1	1	22	102:157	37
9.	KTH Krynica	36	7	2	1	0	0	26	106:194	27
10.	Naprzód Janów	36	5	0	0	0	0	31	87:209	17

== Playoffs ==
=== Quarterfinals ===
- KS Cracovia - Zaglebie Sosnowiec 3-0 on series
- JKH GKS Jasztrebie - KH Sanok 3-2 on series
- GKS Tychy - Stoczniowiec Gdansk 3-1 on series
- Unia Oswiecim - Podhale Nowy Targ 3-2 on series

=== Semifinals ===
- KS Cracovia - JKH GKS Jasztrebie 3-1 on series
- GKS Tychy - Unia Oswiecim 3-2 on series

=== Final ===
- KS Cracovia - GKS Tychy 3-1 on series

=== 3rd place ===
- Unia Oswiecim - JKH GKS Jasztrebie 3-1 on series

== Play-downs ==
- KTH Krynica - Naprzód Janów 3:2 (4:3 n.V., 1:6, 4:3, 0:1, 4:3)

== Relegation ==
- KTH Krynica - GKS Katowice 4:0 (4:3 n.V., 6:1, 7:1, 4:2)
