= 2007–08 Polska Liga Hokejowa season =

Polish ice hockey season

The 2007–08 Polska Liga Hokejowa season was the 73rd season of the Polska Liga Hokejowa, the top level of ice hockey in Poland. 10 teams participated in the league, and KS Cracovia won the championship.

== First round ==
	Club	GP	W	OTW	OTL	L	Goals	Pts
1.	KS Cracovia	36	23	4	4	5	144:79	81
2.	GKS Tychy	36	23	3	1	9	131:80	76
3.	Zaglebie Sosnowiec	36	21	2	2	11	133:102	69
4.	Stoczniowiec Gdansk	36	18	3	6	9	130:109	66
5.	Podhale Nowy Targ	36	16	4	2	14	150:119	58
6.	Naprzód Janów	36	15	3	3	15	118:127	54
7.	THK Torun	36	15	2	4	15	124:118	53
8.	KH Sanok	36	12	4	3	18	115:128	45
9.	Polonia Bytom	36	6	4	3	23	98:138	29
10.	Unia Oświęcim	36	1	2	2	31	74:217	9

== Final round ==
	Club	GP	W	OTW	OTL	L	Goals	Pts
1.	GKS Tychy	46	29	6	2	11	171:107	97
2.	KS Cracovia	46	28	4	5	9	184:110	96
3.	Zaglebie Sosnowiec	46	27	2	3	14	166:130	88
4.	Stoczniowiec Gdansk	46	23	3	6	14	162:145	82
5.	Podhale Nowy Targ	46	19	5	2	20	183:154	69
6.	Naprzód Janów	46	17	4	3	22	147:177	62

== Qualification round ==
	Club	GP	W	OTW	OTL	L	Goals	Pts
7.	THK Torun	42	19	2	4	17	145:138	65
8.	KH Sanok	42	15	5	3	20	145:149	56
9.	Polonia Bytom	42	9	4	3	26	117:156	38
10.	Unia Oświęcim	42	2	2	3	35	90:244	13

== Playoffs ==
Quarter-finals
GKS Tychy	3
KH Sanok	0
Stocznowiec Gdansk	2
Podhale Nowy Targ	3
KS Cracovia	3
THK Torun	1
Zaglebie Sosnowiec	3
Naprzód Janów	1

Semi-finals
GKS Tychy	4
Podhale Nowy Targ	2
KS Cracovia	4
Zaglebie Sosnowiec	1

Final
GKS Tychy	2
KS Cracovia	4
Third place
Zaglebie Sosnowiec	1
Podhale Nowy Targ	3

== Relegation ==
- Polonia Bytom - Unia Oświęcim 4:3 (7:1, 4:5 SO, 5:2, 5:1, 3:4, 2:4, 3:2)
