= Stanislav Hudec =

Slovak ice hockey player

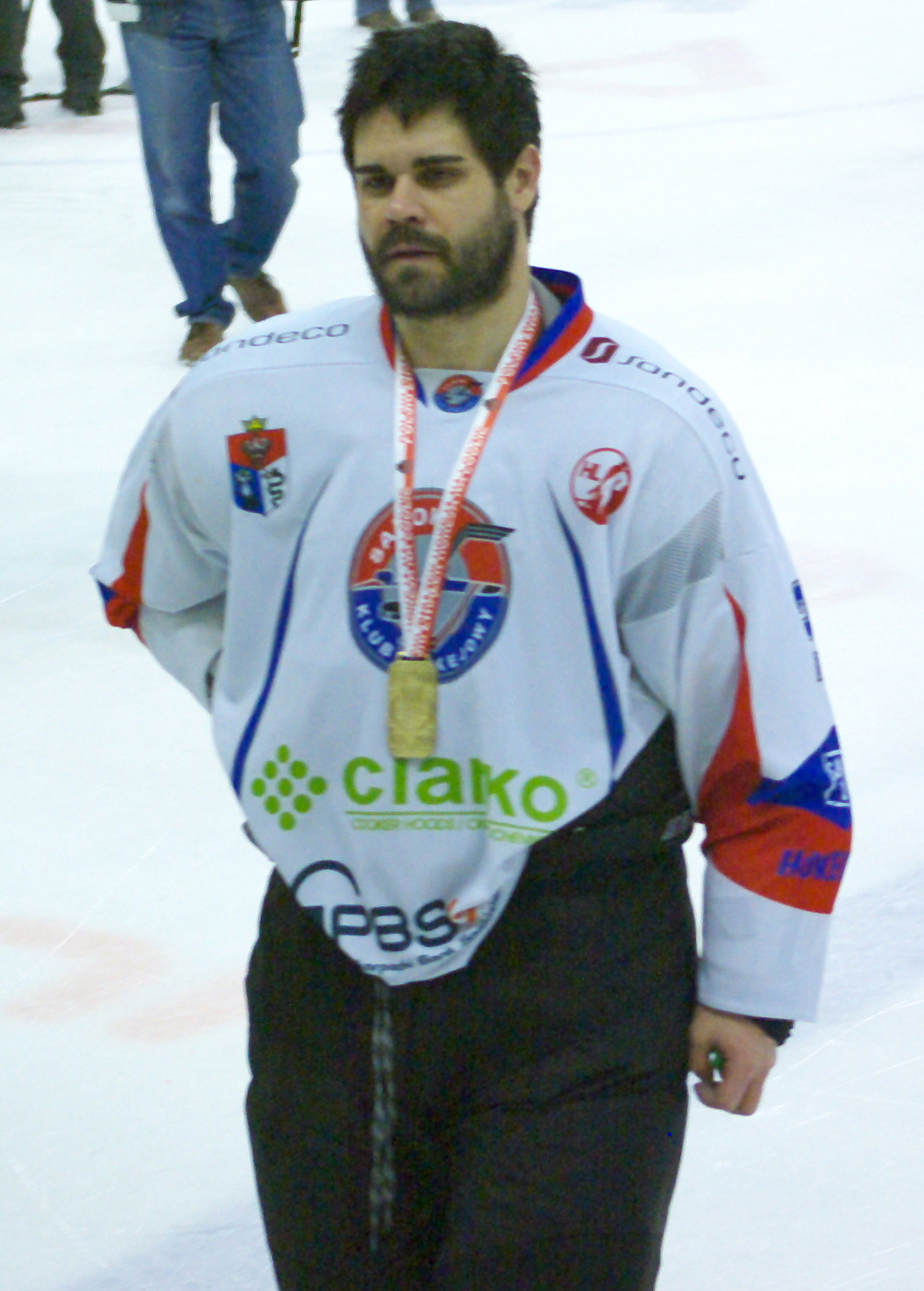
- Born: June 3, 1982 (age 42); Nitra, Czechoslovakia
- Height: 6 ft 0 in (183 cm)
- Weight: 209 lb (95 kg; 14 st 13 lb)
- Position: Defence
- Shoots: Left
- team Former teams: Free Agent; MHC Martin; HC Vítkovice; HC Vityaz; EHC Basel; HC Plzeň; HC Sparta Praha; Motor České Budějovice; HC Slovan Bratislava; HC Oceláři Třinec; HK Nitra; SG Cortina; HC Dynamo Pardubice; Dragons de Rouen; KH Sanok; MsHK Žilina; ŠHK 37 Piešťany
- National team: Slovakia
- Playing career: 2003–present

Stanislav Hudec (born June 3, 1982) is a Slovak professional ice hockey defenceman. He is currently a free agent having last played for HSC Csíkszereda of the Erste Liga and the Romanian Hockey League.

Hudec played in the Czech Extraliga for HC Vítkovice, HC Plzeň, HC Sparta Praha, Motor České Budějovice, HC Oceláři Třinec and HC Dynamo Pardubice. He also played in the Slovak Extraliga for MHC Martin, HC Slovan Bratislava, HK Nitra and MsHK Žilina.

== Career statistics ==
			Regular season					Playoffs
Season	Team	League	GP	G	A	Pts	PIM	GP	G	A	Pts	PIM
1999–00	HK Nitra	Slovak2	9	1	2	3	8	—	—	—	—	—
2000–01	Chicoutimi Sagueneens	QMJHL	68	4	16	20	72	7	1	2	3	6
2001–02	Chicoutimi Sagueneens	QMJHL	60	10	32	42	91	4	1	1	2	2
2002–03	Chicoutimi Sagueneens	QMJHL	11	1	3	4	10	—	—	—	—	—
2002–03	MHC Martin	Slovak	18	1	2	3	41	4	0	1	1	4
2003–04	MHC Martin	Slovak	52	6	15	21	104	—	—	—	—	—
2004–05	HC Vitkovice	Czech	46	5	1	6	50	12	2	3	5	12
2005–06	HC Vitkovice Steel	Czech	52	10	17	27	92	6	0	1	1	6
2006–07	HC Vitkovice Steel	Czech	32	3	2	5	82	—	—	—	—	—
2007–08	Vityaz Chekhov	Russia	26	2	3	5	24	—	—	—	—	—
2007–08	EHC Basel	NLA	12	1	2	3	20	—	—	—	—	—
2008–09	HC Lasselsberger Plzen	Czech	40	1	6	7	54	—	—	—	—	—
2008–09	HC Sparta Praha	Czech	8	1	0	1	28	8	0	1	1	6
2009–10	HC Sparta Praha	Czech	19	1	0	1	10	—	—	—	—	—
2009–10	HC Ceske Budejovice	Czech	7	0	0	0	8	—	—	—	—	—
2009–10	HC Slovan Bratislava	Slovak	9	0	3	3	12	15	2	5	7	46
2010–11	HC Ocelari Trinec	Czech	45	5	9	14	50	12	2	1	3	8
2011–12	HC Ocelari Trinec	Czech	40	1	4	5	26	—	—	—	—	—
2012–13	HK Nitra	Slovak	5	0	1	1	39	—	—	—	—	—
2012–13	SG Cortina	Italy	7	1	2	3	8	—	—	—	—	—
2012–13	HC CSOB Pardubice	Czech	6	0	0	0	2	—	—	—	—	—
2013–14	Dragons de Rouen	France	6	0	2	2	12	—	—	—	—	—
2013–14	KH Sanok	Poland	8	6	5	11	2	10	1	1	2	4
2014–15	MsHK Zilina	Slovak	36	3	10	13	93	—	—	—	—	—
2015–16	SHK 37 Piestany	Slovak	53	6	7	13	40	—	—	—	—	—
2016–17	EHC Waldkraiburg	Germany3	11	4	4	8	12	—	—	—	—	—
2016–17	Dunaújvárosi Acélbikák	Erste Liga	7	3	5	8	—	7	2	2	4	—
2017–18	SC Csíkszereda	Erste Liga	1	0	0	0	—	—	—	—	—	—
2017–18	SC Csíkszereda	Romania	2	0	1	1	12	—	—	—	—	—
Czech totals			295	27	39	66	402	38	4	6	10	32
Slovak totals			173	16	38	54	329	30	4	9	13	56
