= Sobera =

Sobera is a surname. Notable people with the surname include:

- Carlos Sobera (born 1960), Spanish actor
- Jerzy Sobera (born 1970), Polish ice hockey player
- Robert Sobera (born 1991), Polish pole vaulter
