= Tomasz Szczerba =

Canadian-Polish ice hockey player

- Born: November 2, 2004 (age 21) Toronto, Canada
- Height: 6 ft 1 in (185 cm)
- Weight: 194 lb (88 kg; 13 st 12 lb)
- Position: Forward
- PHL team: Podhale Nowy Targ
- Playing career: 2014–present

Tomasz Szczerba (born November 2, 2004) is a Canadian-Polish professional ice hockey forward currently playing for the Podhale Nowy Targ team in the Polska Hokej Liga. He was born in Toronto, Canada, to Polish parents.

Before playing for Podhale Nowy Targ, he played in the Quebec Maritimes Junior Hockey League and the German junior league. During this period he scored six points, which was four more points than any other U20 skaters for that season.

He transferred to Podhale Nowy Targ in November 2023 as a forward. In May 2024, Benjamin Krzywicki, from Polish Puck, included him in his top 10 reasons to be excited about Polish hockey in 2024. During his first season in the team on the Polska Hokej Liga, he played 29 matches, scored 2 goals and had 5 assists. For the local Podhale League, he played 9 matches, scored 8 goals and had six assists.
