= Jerzy Sobera =

Polish ice hockey player (born 1970)

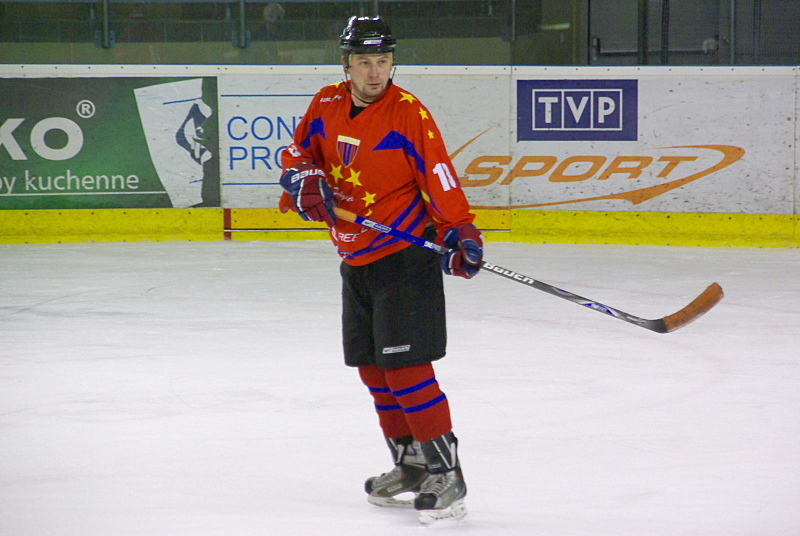
- Sobera in 2012
- Born: September 4, 1970 (age 55) Bytom, Poland
- Height: 6 ft 1 in (185 cm)
- Weight: 205 lb (93 kg; 14 st 9 lb)
- Position: Defence
- Shot: Left
- Played for: Polonia Bytom; Towimor Toruń; Cracovia; SKH Sanok
- National team: Poland
- Playing career: 1989–2006

Jerzy Witold Sobera (born 4 September 1970) is a Polish former ice hockey player. He played for Polonia Bytom, Towimor Toruń, Cracovia, and SKH Sanok during his career. He also played for the Polish national team at the 1992 Winter Olympics. Sobera was a candidate in the 2010 Polish municipal elections for the city council of Ruda Śląska, but failed to win a seat.
