= 2008–09 Polska Liga Hokejowa season =

Polish ice hockey season

The 2008–09 Polska Liga Hokejowa season was the 74th season of the Polska Liga Hokejowa, the top level of ice hockey in Poland. 10 teams participated in the league, and KS Cracovia won the championship.

== First round ==
	Club	GP	W	OTW	OTL	L	Goals	Pts
1.	Podhale Nowy Targ	36	23	2	2	9	154:93	75
2.	KS Cracovia	36	22	4	0	10	154:84	74
3.	Stoczniowiec Gdansk	36	21	2	5	8	135:104	72
4.	Zaglebie Sosnowiec	36	19	0	6	11	139:117	63
5.	Naprzód Janów	36	17	3	2	14	136:119	59
6.	GKS Tychy	36	16	3	0	17	121:97	54
7.	JKH GKS Jastrzębie	36	16	2	2	16	122:112	54
8.	THK Torun	36	8	8	2	18	92:124	42
9.	KH Sanok	36	9	2	6	19	102:141	37
10.	Polonia Bytom	36	3	0	1	32	47:211	10

== Final round ==
	Club	GP	W	OTW	OTL	L	Goals	Pts
1.	Podhale Nowy Targ	46	31	2	2	11	196:114	99
2.	KS Cracovia	46	27	5	0	14	187:112	90
3.	Stoczniowiec Gdansk	46	25	2	6	13	163:143	85
4.	GKS Tychy	46	23	3	0	20	147:120	76
5.	Naprzód Janów	46	20	3	3	20	169:155	69
6.	Zaglebie Sosnowiec	46	20	1	6	19	164:157	68

== Qualification round ==
	Club	GP	W	OTW	OTL	L	Goals	Pts
7.	JKH GKS Jastrzębie	42	19	3	2	18	141:128	65
8.	TKH Torun	42	10	9	4	18	116:142	52
9.	KH Sanok	42	14	2	6	20	125:153	52
10.	Polonia Bytom	42	3	0	1	38	55:239	10

== Playoffs ==
Quarter-finals
KS Cracovia	3
JKH GKS Jastrzębie	0
Stoczniowiec Gdansk	3
Zaglebie Sosnowiec	2
Podhale Nowy Targ	3
THK Torun	0
GKS Tychy	3
Naprzód Janów	1

Semi-finals
KS Cracovia	4
Stoczniowiec Gdansk	0
Podhale Nowy Targ	2
GKS Tychy	4

Final
KS Cracovia	4
GKS Tychy	1
Third place
Podhale Nowy Targ	3
Stoczniowiec Gdansk	0

== Relegation ==
- KH Sanok - Polonia Bytom 4:0 (3:1, 5:3, 7:6 SO, 8:2)
