= Vladimír Luka =

Czech ice hockey player

- Born: March 7, 1982 (age 43); Karviná, Czechoslovakia
- Height: 5 ft 11 in (180 cm)
- Weight: 187 lb (85 kg; 13 st 5 lb)
- Position: Forward
- Shoots: Left
- NIHL team: Telford Tigers
- Playing career: 2001–present

Vladimír Luka (born March 7, 1982) is a Czech professional ice hockey forward. He is currently playing for the Telford Tigers of the National Ice Hockey League.

Luka made his Czech Extraliga debut playing with HC Oceláři Třinec during the 2015-16 Czech Extraliga season.
