= 2011–12 Polska Liga Hokejowa season =

- League: Polska Liga Hokejowa
- Sport: Ice hockey
- Number of teams: 8

Regular season
- Regular-season winner: Ciarko PBS Bank Sanok
- Relegated to 1. Liga: Podhale Nowy Targ

Playoffs

Finals
- Champions: Ciarko PBS Bank Sanok
- Runners-up: KS Cracovia

Polska Liga Hokejowa seasons
- ← 2010–11 2012–13 →

The 2011–12 Polska Liga Hokejowa season was the 77th season of the Polska Liga Hokejowa, the top level of ice hockey in Poland. Eight teams participated in the league, and Ciarko PBS Bank Sanok won the championship.

== Regular season ==
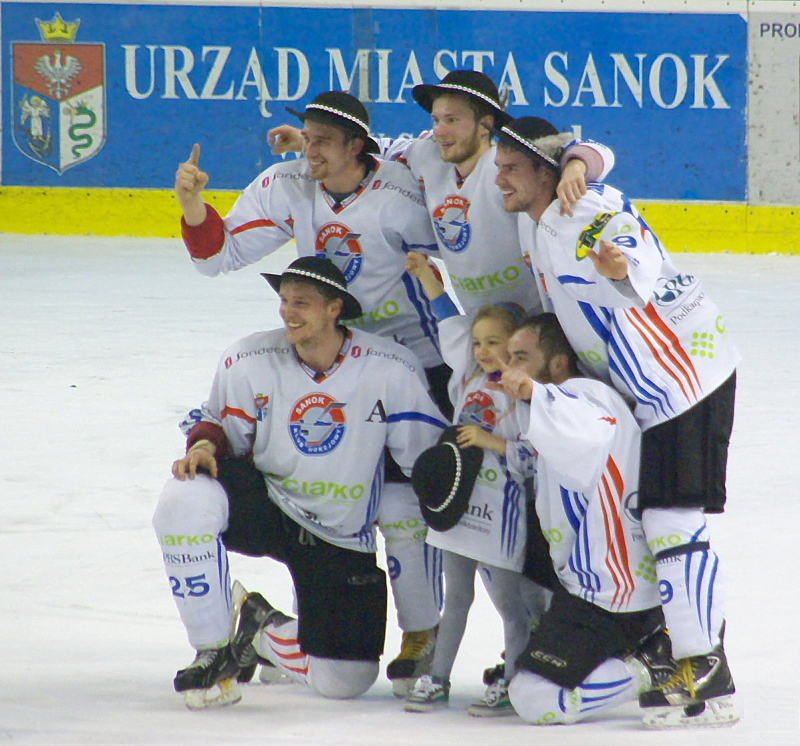
Sanok players after winning the championship.

	Club	GP	W	OTW	OTL	L	Goals	Pts
1.	Ciarko PBS Bank Sanok	42	29	3	0	10	204:112	93
2.	KS Cracovia	42	25	3	1	13	210:130	82
3.	Unia Oświęcim	42	26	0	3	13	182:133	81
4.	JKH GKS Jastrzębie	42	22	4	4	12	161:129	78
5.	GKS Tychy	42	22	3	4	13	139:103	76
6.	Zagłębie Sosnowiec	42	9	6	2	25	122:177	41
7.	KS Toruń	42	7	2	4	29	107:228	29
8.	MMKS Podhale Nowy Targ	42	5	2	5	30	116:229	24

== Playoffs ==
Semi-finals
Ciarko PBS Bank Sanok	4
JKH GKS Jastrzębie	0
KS Cracovia	4
Unia Oświęcim	0

Final
KH Sanok	4
KS Cracovia	1
Third place
Unia Oświęcim	4
JKH GKS Jastrzębie	3

== Play-downs ==
- GKS Tychy - MMKS Podhale Nowy Targ 4:1
- Zagłębie Sosnowiec - KS Toruń 4:3

5th place

- GKS Tychy - Zagłębie Sosnowiec 10:1 (Over two games)

7th place

- KS Toruń - MMKS Podhale Nowy Targ 4:1

MMKS Podhale Nowy Targ is relegated to the Polish 1. Liga
