= 2013–14 Polska Hokej Liga season =

- League: Polska Hokej Liga
- Sport: Ice hockey
- Number of teams: 9

Regular season
- Regular-season winner: GKS Tychy
- Relegated to 1. Liga: Podhale Nowy Targ

Playoffs

Finals
- Champions: KH Sanok
- Runners-up: GKS Tychy

Polska Liga Hokejowa seasons
- ← 2012–13 2014–15 →

The 2013–14 Polska Hokej Liga season was the 79th season of the Polska Liga Hokejowa, the top level of ice hockey in Poland. The league was renamed the Polska Hokej Liga at the start of the season. Nine teams participated in the league, and KH Sanok won the championship. Podhale Nowy Targ was relegated to the 1. Liga, but was able to stay in the PHL after KTH Krynica did not get a league license for 2014-15.

== Regular season ==
| | Club | GP | W | OTW | SOW | SOL | OTL | L | Goals | Pts |
|---|---|---|---|---|---|---|---|---|---|---|
| 1. | GKS Tychy | 48 | 39 | 2 | 0 | 0 | 0 | 7 | 249:101 | 121 |
| 2. | KH Sanok | 48 | 32 | 1 | 2 | 0 | 2 | 11 | 241:122 | 104 |
| 3. | JKH GKS Jastrzębie | 48 | 27 | 1 | 2 | 3 | 1 | 14 | 211:118 | 91 |
| 4. | KS Cracovia | 48 | 28 | 2 | 0 | 1 | 2 | 15 | 210:148 | 91 |
| 5. | Aksam Unia Oświęcim | 48 | 22 | 3 | 3 | 0 | 0 | 20 | 156:136 | 78 |
| 6. | KTH Krynica | 48 | 15 | 1 | 1 | 1 | 0 | 30 | 140:252 | 50 |
| 7. | GKS Katowice | 48 | 14 | 0 | 0 | 2 | 1 | 31 | 147:263 | 45 |
| 8. | Polonia Bytom | 48 | 10 | 0 | 1 | 2 | 2 | 33 | 134:2218 | 36 |
| 9. | Podhale Nowy Targ | 48 | 9 | 0 | 1 | 1 | 2 | 35 | 131:258 | 32 |

== Playoffs ==
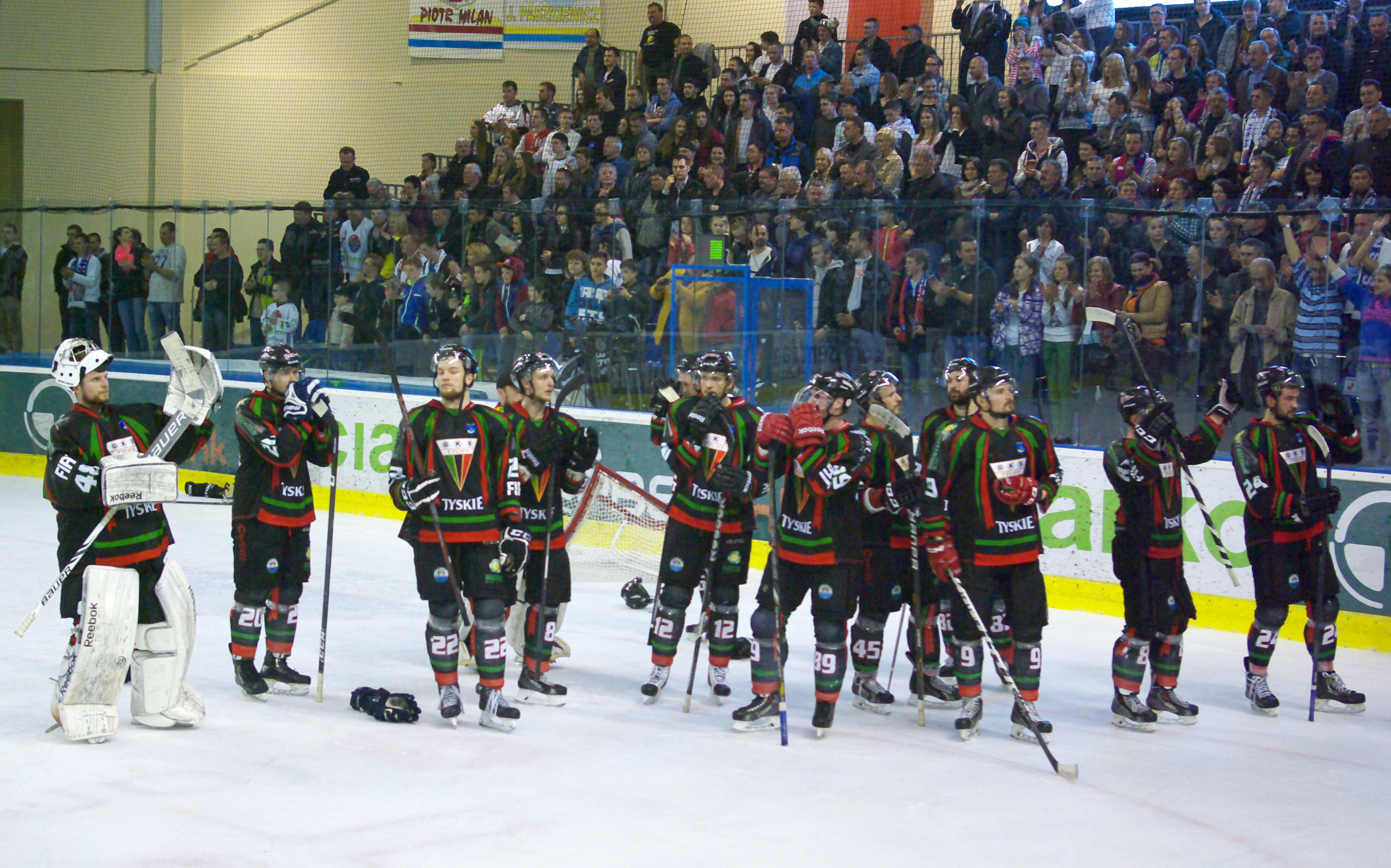
GKS Tychy won the regular season championship.

Quarter-finals
GKS Tychy | 3
Polonia Bytom | 0
KS Cracovia | 2
Aksam Unia Oświęcim | 3
JKH GKS Jastrzębie | 3
KTH Krynica | 0
KH Sanok | 3
GKS Katowice | 0

Semi-finals
GKS Tychy | 4
Aksam Unia Oświęcim | 2
JKH GKS Jastrzębie | 1
KH Sanok | 4

Final
KH Sanok | 4
GKS Tychy | 2
Third place
JKH GKS Jastrzębie | 3
Aksam Unia Oświęcim | 0
