= STS Sanok =

Ciarko STS Sanok
- City: Sanok, Poland
- League: Polska Hokej Liga
- Founded: 1958; 68 years ago
- Home arena: Arena Sanok (capacity: 5,000)
- Colours: Red, white, blue
- Head coach: Marcin Ćwikła
- Website: www.sts.sanok.pl

Franchise history
- 1958–1960: RKS Sanoczanka
- 1960–1991: Stal Sanok
- 1991–1994: STS Sanok
- 1994–1999: STS-Autosan Sanok
- 1999–2001: SKH Sanok
- 2001–2008: KH Sanok
- 2008–2011: Ciarko KH Sanok
- 2011–2015: Ciarko PBS Bank KH Sanok
- 2015–2016: Ciarko PBS Bank STS Sanok
- 2017–: Ciarko KH 58 Sanok

STS Sanok is an ice hockey team in Sanok, Poland. The team competes in the Polska Hokej Liga, the highest league in Poland. The team was inactive during the 2016–17 season due to financial difficulties.

The team's full legal name is Sanockie Towarzystwo Sportowe S. A.. The club was founded in 1958 as RKS Sanoczanka, and has undergone a number of name changes. It has been playing under the name Ciarko KH 58 Sanok since 2017, for sponsorship reasons. They play their home games in Arena Sanok, which has a capacity of 3,100 people. Between 1965 and 2006, they played their games at Torsan, which has now been taken down and is being used as a parking lot.

The club's main sponsors are PBS Bank, Ciarko, and the City of Sanok. The head coach is Marcin Ćwikła, a former homegrown player who also played for the Polish national team.

== History ==
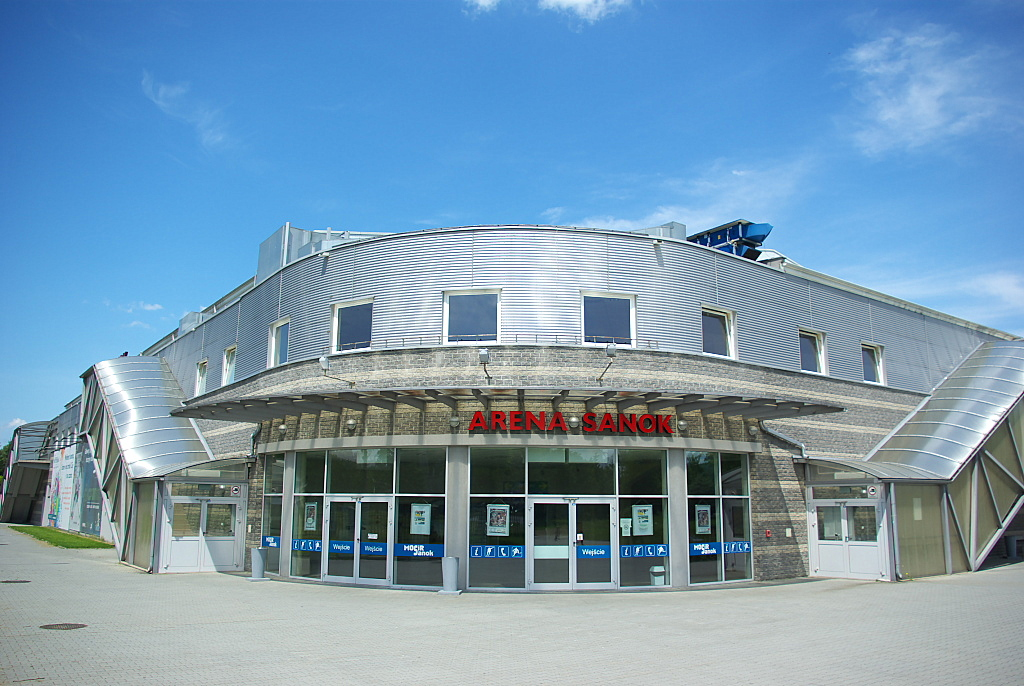
Arena Sanok, where KH Sanok plays

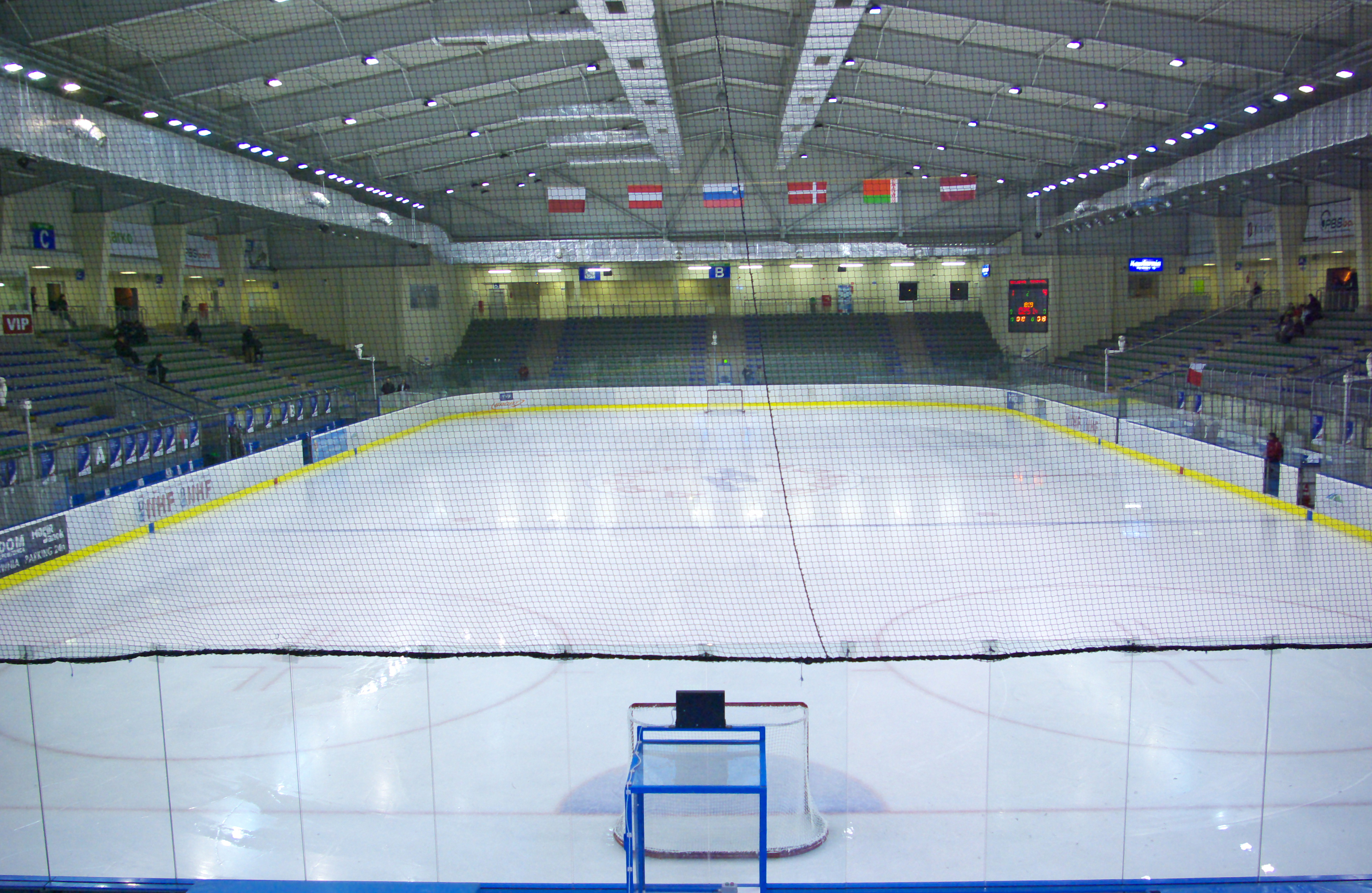
Arena Sanok, where KH Sanok plays

STS Sanok was founded in 1958 as RKS Sanoczanka, and have changed their name several times since. The team was also called Stal Sanok from 1960 to 1991, STS Sanok from 1991 to 1994, STS-Autosan Sanok from 1994 to 1999, SKH Sanok from 1999 to 2001, KH Sanok from 2001 to 2011, Ciarko PBS Bank KH Sanok from 2011 to 2015, before taking on their present Ciarko PBS Bank STS Sanok name.

Sanok has won the Polska Hokej Liga playoff championship twice, in the 2011/2012 and 2013/2014 seasons. They won the Polish Cup twice, in 2010/11 and 2011/12.

== Achievements ==
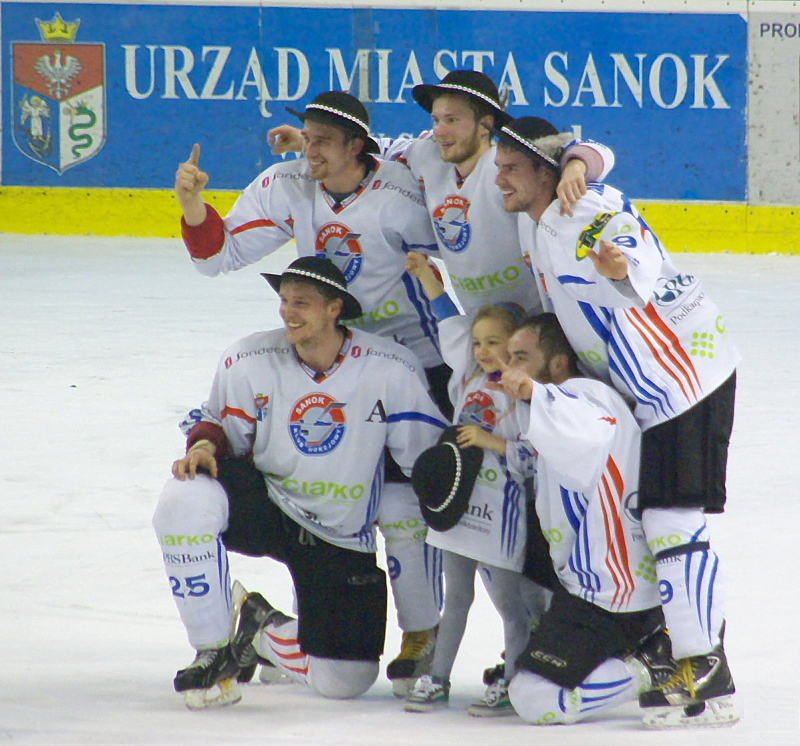
Sanok players after winning the 2011–12 Polish Hockey League championship.

Polish League Playoff Champion:

- (2) 2011–12, 2013–14

Polish League Regular Season:

- (2) 2011–12, 2012–13

Polish Cup:

- Winners (2): 2010–11, 2011–12
- Runners-up (3): 2012–13, 2013–14, 2014–15

Promotion to Polish League:

- 1976, 1992, 2004.

== Season-by-season results ==
Season	Team Name	League	Playoff Rank	Playoff Result	Cup Result
1970–1971	Stal Sanok	III Liga	1	Promotion	
1971/1972	Stal Sanok	II Liga	4		
1972/1973	Stal Sanok	II Liga	5		
1973/1974	Stal Sanok	II Liga	6		
1974/1975	Stal Sanok	II Liga	3		
1975/1976	Stal Sanok	II Liga	1	Promotion	
1976/1977	Stal Sanok	I Liga	11	Relegation	
1977/1978	Stal Sanok	II Liga	4		
1978/1979	Stal Sanok	II Liga	5		
1979/1980	Stal Sanok	II Liga	6		
1980/1981	Stal Sanok	II Liga	7		
1981/1982	Stal Sanok	II Liga	3		
1982/1983	Stal Sanok	II Liga Group South	4		
1983/1984	Stal Sanok	II Liga	3		
1984/1985	Stal Sanok	II Liga	4		
1985/1986	Stal Sanok	II Liga	4		
1986/1987	Stal Sanok	II Liga	3		
1987/1988	Stal Sanok	II Liga	5		
1988/1989	Stal Sanok	II Liga	3		
1989/1990	Stal Sanok	II Liga	3		
1990/1991	Stal Sanok	II Liga	3		
1991/1992	STS Sanok	II Liga	1	Promotion	
1992/1993	STS Sanok	I Liga (renamed Polska Liga Hokejowa)	5		
1993/1994	STS Sanok	Polska Liga Hokejowa	7		
1994/1995	STS Autosan Sanok	Polska Liga Hokejowa	9		
1995/1996	STS Autosan Sanok	Polska Liga Hokejowa	5		
1996/1997	STS Autosan Sanok	Polska Liga Hokejowa	4		
1997/1998	STS Autosan Sanok	Polska Liga Hokejowa	6		
1998/1999	STS Autosan Sanok	Polska Liga Hokejowa	8		
1999/2000	SKH Sanok	Polska Liga Hokejowa	4		
2000/2001	SKH Sanok	Polska Liga Hokejowa	8	Relegation	
2001/2002	KH Sanok	I Liga	4		
2002/2003	KH Sanok	I Liga	2		
2003/2004	KH Sanok	I Liga	2	Promotion	1st Round
2004/2005	KH Sanok	Polska Liga Hokejowa	7		1st Round
2005/2006	KH Sanok	Polska Liga Hokejowa	8		
2006/2007	KH Sanok	Polska Liga Hokejowa	9		1st Round
2007/2008	KH Sanok	Polska Liga Hokejowa	8		1st Round
2008/2009	Ciarko KH Sanok	Polska Liga Hokejowa	9		
2009/2010	Ciarko KH Sanok	Polska Liga Hokejowa	9		
2010/2011	Ciarko KH Sanok	Polska Liga Hokejowa	6		Cup Champions
2011/2012	Ciarko PBS Bank KH Sanok	Polska Liga Hokejowa	1	Playoff Champions	Cup Champions
2012/2013	Ciarko PBS Bank KH Sanok	Polska Liga Hokejowa	4		Finalists
2013/2014	Ciarko PBS Bank KH Sanok	Polska Hokej Liga	1	Playoff Champions	Finalists
2014/2015	Ciarko PBS Bank KH Sanok	Polska Hokej Liga	4		Finalists
2015/2016	Ciarko PBS Bank STS Sanok	Polska Hokej Liga	4		
2016/2017	Ciarko PBS Bank STS Sanok	Did Not Play	—		
2017/2018	Ciarko KH 58 Sanok	Slovak 2. Liga	In Progress		

== 2017/18 roster ==
Updated 19 November 2017

No.	Nat	Player	Pos	S/G	Age	Acquired	Birthplace
88	(Poland)	Marcin Biały (A)	F	R	37	2017	Sanok, Poland
79	(Poland)	Maciej Bielec	LW	R	30	2017	Poland
15	(Poland)	Patryk Chmura	RW		30	2017	Poland
95	(Poland)	Rafał Ćwikła	LW	R	36	2017	Rzeszów, Poland
38	(Poland)	Hubert Demkowicz	D	R	32	2017	Katowice, Poland
97	(Poland)	Patryk Dobrzynski	F	L	29	2017	Zakopane, Poland
11	(Poland)	Konrad Filipek	F		26	2017	Poland
	(Belarus)	Oleg Filippov	D	L	32	2017	Grodno, Belarus
55	(Belarus)	Vladislav Gavrus	F	L	28	2017	Grodno, Belarus
74	(Poland)	Slawomir Gulbinowicz	D		51	2017	Poland
30	(Poland)	Bartosz Hućko	G	L	29	2017	Poland
44	(Belarus)	Nikita Kurilo	D	L	28	2017	Grodno, Belarus
76	(Poland)	Adrian Maciejko	F	R	38	2017	Poland
55	(Poland)	Marcin Mazur	D	R	35	2017	Poland
22	(Poland)	Maciej Mermer (A)	F	L	47	2017	Sanok, Poland
71	(Poland)	Karol Michalski	F		29	2017	Poland
9	(Poland)	Kamil Olearczyk	D	R	30	2017	Poland
25	(Poland)	Mateusz Skrabalak	G	L	32	2017	Poland
77	(Poland)	Orest Sokalski	F		26	2017	Poland
18	(Poland)	Mateusz Wilusz (C)	F	L	35	2017	Poland
10	(Poland)	Maciej Witan	F		25	2017	Poland

== Notable players ==
KH Sanok logo until 2015

=== Retired numbers ===
STS Sanok retired numbers
No.	Nationality	Player	Lifespan
7	(Poland)	Piotr Milan	1971–1995
17	(Poland)	Jan Paszkiewicz	1950–2011

Homegrown:

- (Poland) Jan Paszkiewicz (top scorer in club history)
- (Poland) Tomasz Demkowicz (Polish national team player)
- (Poland) Marcin Ćwikła (Polish national team player)
- (Poland) Michał Radwański (Polish national team player)
- (Poland) Maciej Mermer (Polish national team player)

Poles from Other Clubs:

- (Poland) Marek Cholewa (3-time Olympian)
- (Poland) Jerzy Sobera (Olympian)
- (Poland) Tomasz Wawrzkiewicz (6-time Representative at the World Championships)
- Marcin Kolusz (Captain of Poland & 1st Player in Club history that has been drafted into the NHL)
- (Poland) Wojtek Wolski (One of the many Poles in the NHL – Played in Sanok during the 2012 NHL Lockout)

Foreigners:

- (Canada) Mike Danton (former NHLer, Naturalized Polish citizen, Poland national team player)
- (Canada) Samson Mahbod
- (Canada) Zenon Konopka (former NHLer)
- Martin Richter (Czech Republic national team player, 1st Player in Club history that has won a World Championship)
- Martin Vozdecký (Czech Republic national roller hockey team player)
- Petr Šinágl (Czech Republic national roller hockey team player)
- Dmitri Suur (Estonia national team player)
- Kaupo Kaljuste (Estonia national team player)
- Nicolas Besch (France national team player)
- Sergei Antipov (Kazakhstan national team player)
- Anthony Aquino (Italy national team player)
- Martin Ivičič (Slovakia national team player)
- Miroslav Zaťko (Slovakia national team player)
- Peter Bartoš (Slovakia national team player, 1st Player in Club history that has played in the NHL)
- Stanislav Hudec (Slovakia national team player)
- Vladislav Baláž (Slovakia national team player)
- Viliam Čacho (Slovakia national team player)
- Jakob Milovanovič (Slovenia national team player)
