= KH Zagłębie Sosnowiec =

- City: Sosnowiec, Poland
- League: Polska Hokej Liga
- Founded: 1937; 89 years ago
- Home arena: Stadion Zimowy
- Colours: Green, red, white
- General manager: Leszek Tokarz
- Head coach: Matias Lehtonen
- Website: zaglebie.eu/hokej

KH Zagłębie Sosnowiec is a professional ice hockey team based in Sosnowiec, Poland. The team competes in the Polska Hokej Liga, the highest league in Poland.

Zagłębie Sosnowiec originated as the ice hockey section of Sosnowieckiego Towarzystwa Sportowego "Unia" which was formed 27 November 1933. Zagłębie Sosnowiec was founded in 1937. They won five PLH titles in six years from 1980–1985, and one Polish 1. Liga title in 2005.

== Achievements ==
- Polish champion : 1980, 1981, 1982, 1983, 1985.
- Polish 1.Liga champion : 2005
