= 2012–13 Polska Liga Hokejowa season =

- League: Polska Liga Hokejowa
- Sport: Ice hockey
- Number of teams: 8

Regular season
- Regular-season winner: KH Sanok
- Relegated to 1. Liga: KS Toruń

Playoffs

Finals
- Champions: KS Cracovia
- Runners-up: JKH GKS Jastrzębie

Polska Liga Hokejowa seasons
- ← 2011–12 2013–14 →

The 2012–13 Polska Liga Hokejowa season was the 78th season of the Polska Liga Hokejowa, the top level of ice hockey in Poland. Eight teams participated in the league, and KS Cracovia won the championship.

Due to financial difficulties, KS Toruń pulled out from competition after 14 matches. They did not participate in the playoffs, and they were relegated to the 1. Liga.

== Regular season ==
	Club	GP	W	OTW	SOW	SOL	OTL	L	Goals	Pts
1.	KH Sanok	38	28	1	1	2	0	6	161:99	90
2.	JKH GKS Jastrzębie	38	21	1	3	1	1	11	157:106	73
3.	GKS Tychy	38	20	1	3	1	0	13	155:108	69
4.	KS Cracovia	38	18	1	1	1	1	16	153:120	60
5.	GKS Katowice	38	17	0	3	1	0	17	133:115	58
6.	Aksam Unia Oświęcim	38	16	0	0	4	1	17	115:141	53
7.	Zagłębie Sosnowiec	38	0	0	2	1	1	32	86:228	12
8.	KS Toruń	14	1	0	1	0	0	12	24:67	5

== Playoffs ==
Quarter-finals
KH Sanok
Bye
KS Cracovia	3
GKS Katowice	0
JKH GKS Jastrzębie	3
Zagłębie Sosnowiec	0
GKS Tychy	3
Unia Oświęcim	1

Semi-finals
KH Sanok	2
KS Cracovia	4
JKH GKS Jastrzębie	4
GKS Tychy	0

Final
JKH GKS Jastrzębie	3
KS Cracovia	4
Third place
KH Sanok	1
GKS Tychy	3

== Placing round ==
	Club	GP	W	OTW	OTL	L	Goals	Pts
5.	GKS Katowice	4	3	0	1	0	22:8	10
6.	Aksam Unia Oświęcim	4	2	1	0	1	21:8	8
7.	Zagłębie Sosnowiec	4	0	0	0	4	5:32	0
