= Polish 1. Liga =

- Sport: Ice hockey
- Founded: 1956; 70 years ago
- Founder: Polish Ice Hockey Federation
- No. of teams: 14
- Country: Poland
- Most recent champion: Naprzód Janów
- Promotion to: Polska Hokej Liga
- Relegation to: Polish 2. Liga
- Related competitions: Polska Hokej Liga
- Website: polskihokej.eu

The Polish 1. Liga operates as the second level of ice hockey in Poland. The league lies below the Polska Hokej Liga.

== Teams (2021–2022) ==
- Sokoly Torun
- UKS Niedzwiadki Sanok
- MMKS Podhale Nowy Targ
- SMS PZHL Katowice
- KS Katowice Naprzód Janów
- SMS Torun
- MOSM Tychy
- GKS Stoczniowiec Gdańsk
- KH Polonia Bytom
- UKS Zagłębie Sosnowiec
- UKH Unia Oswiecim
- Opole HK
- MKS Cracovia Krakow
- ŁKH Łódź

== Champions ==
- 1956 – OWKS Zawisza Bydgoszcz
- 1957 – Piast Cieszyn
- 1958 – ŁKS Łódź
- 1959 – Pomorzanin Toruń
- 1960 – Polonia Bydgoszcz
- 1961 – Second Division teams included in League One
- 1962 – Naprzód Janów
- 1963 – ŁKS Łódź
- 1964 – Górnik Murcki
- 1965 – Pomorzanin Toruń
- 1966 – KTH Krynica
- 1967 – KS Cracovia
- 1968 – Włókniarz Zgierz
- 1969 – ŁKS Łódź
- 1970 – Unia Oświęcim
- 1971 – Zagłębie Sosnowiec
- 1972 – KTH Krynica
- 1973 – Zagłębie Sosnowiec
- 1974 – Legia Warszawa
- 1975 – GKS Tychy
- 1976 – Stal Sanok
- 1977 – KS Cracovia
- 1978 – Legia Warszawa
- 1979 – GKS Tychy
- 1980 – Budowlani Bydgoszcz
- 1981 – Polonia Bytom
- 1982 – Stoczniowiec Gdańsk
- 1983 – Unia Oświęcim
- 1984 – Stoczniowiec Gdańsk
- 1985 – Legia KTH Krynica
- 1986 – Polonia Bydgoszcz
- 1987 – Unia Oświęcim
- 1988 – Pomorzanin Toruń
- 1989 – Polonia Bydgoszcz
- 1990 – ŁKS Łódź
- 1991 – Zofiówka Jastrzębie
- 1992 – STS Sanok
- 1993 – MOSiR Sosnowiec
- 1994 – BTH Bydgoszcz
- 1995 – Znicz Pruszków
- 1996 – KTH Optimus Krynica
- 1997 – not contested
- 1998 – not contested
- 1999 – not contested
- 2000 – Polonia Bytom
- 2001 – Zagłębie Sosnowiec
- 2002 – TKH Toruń
- 2003 – Orlik Opole
- 2004 – KS Cracovia
- 2005 – Zagłębie Sosnowiec
- 2006 – KTH Krynica
- 2007 – Polonia Bytom
- 2008 – JKH Czarne Jastrzębie
- 2009 – Unia Oświęcim
- 2010 – KTH Krynica
- 2011 – Nesta Toruń
- 2012 – HC GKS Katowice
- 2013 – Polonia Bytom
- 2014 – Naprzód Janów
- 2015 – Zagłębie Sosnowiec
- 2016 – Stoczniowiec 2014 Gdańsk
- 2017 – Naprzód Janów
