= KTH Krynica =

- City: Krynica-Zdrój, Poland
- League: Polish 1. Liga (Currently Inactive)
- Founded: 1928; 98 years ago
- Home arena: Miejski Ośrodek Sportu i Rekreacji w Krynicy-Zdroju
- Colours: Red, Gold, Green
- Head coach: Josef Dobos

KTH Krynica is an ice hockey team in Krynica-Zdroj, Poland, which has temporarily suspended operations due to financial constraints. The team last competed in the Polish 1. Liga, the second level of ice hockey in Poland, during the 2014-15 season.

== History ==
KTH Krynica was founded in 1928, and the club's home rink hosted the 1931 Men's World Ice Hockey Championships.

They won the Polska Liga Hokejowa in 1950, but then struggled and were relegated to the Polish 1. Liga, which they have won three times. They have made frequent appearances in the Polska Liga Hokejowa since then, the most recent of them being in the 2010-11 season.

The club participated in the 1999 IIHF Continental Cup.

== Achievements ==
- Polish Champion: 1950
- 2nd place: 1949, 1951, 1953, 1999
- 3rd place: 1937, 1952, 1957, 2000
- Polish 1. Liga Champion: 1975, 2006, 2010
