= KH Energa Toruń =

- Division: Polska Hokej Liga
- Founded: 1924; 102 years ago
- History: TKS Toruń (1924–1945); Pomorzanin Toruń (1945–1990); Towimor Toruń (1990–1995); TTH Metron Toruń (1995–1997); Filmar Toruń (1998–2000); TKH Toruń (2001–2010); KS Torun HSA (2010–2012); Nesta Karawela Toruń (2012–2015); Nesta Toruń (2015–2016); Nesta Mires Toruń (2016–2019); KH Energa Toruń (2019–present)
- Home arena: Tor-Tor
- City: Toruń, Poland
- Team colours: White, red, navy blue
- Head coach: Jury Czuch
- Official website: torunskihokej.pl

KH Energa Toruń is a professional ice hockey team based in Toruń, Poland. The team competes in the Polska Hokej Liga, the highest league in Poland.

== Team information ==
- Full name: Klub Sportowy Toruń Hokejowa Spółka Akcyjna
- Address: Bema 23/29, 87-100 Toruń
- Home arena name: Tor-Tor
- Home arena capacity: 3,200

== Trophies and successes ==
- Polish League 2nd place: 1968
- Polish League 3rd place: 1928, 1950, 1967, 1969, 1996
- Polish 1. Liga champions: 2002, 2011
- Polish Cup winner: 2006
- Polish Cup finalist: 2004

== Current roster ==
Updated January 25, 2009

No.	Nat	Player	Pos	S/G	Age	Acquired	Birthplace
18	(Poland)	Przemysław Bomastek (C)	RW	L	47	1998	Toruń, Poland
26	(Poland)	Kamil Cichewicz	D	L	37	2006	Bydgoszcz, Poland
55	(Poland)	Miłosz Ciesielski	G	L	36	2008	Toruń, Poland
10	(Poland)	Łukasz Chrzanowski	LW	L	46	2001	Toruń, Poland
81	(Poland)	Tomasz Chyliński	C	L	38	2007	Tychy, Poland
7	(Poland)	Rafał Cychowski	D	L	48	2007	Sosnowiec, Poland
16	(Poland)	Bartosz Dąbkowski	D	L	41	2004	Toruń, Poland
29	(Poland)	Jarosław Dołęga (A)	RW	L	43	2001	Toruń, Poland
68	(Poland)	Jacek Dzięgiel	C	L	41	2007	Toruń, Poland
87	(Poland)	Kamil Gościmiński	LW	L	36	2007	Toruń, Poland
11	(Poland)	Paweł Jakubowski	G	L	45	2008	Gdynia, Poland
15	(Poland)	Mariusz Jastrzębski	LW	R	41	2007	Nowy Targ, Poland
13	(Poland)	Piotr Koseda	D	L	41	2005	Toruń, Poland
91	(Poland)	Tomasz Koszarek	C	L	46	2007	Nowy Targ, Poland
61	(Slovakia)	Zoltan Kubát	D	L	43	2007	Kežmarok, Slovakia
66	(Poland)	Mariusz Kuchnicki	C	L	39	2003	Toruń, Poland
12	(Poland)	Miłosz Lidtke	D	L	36	2007	Toruń, Poland
19	(Poland)	Arkadiusz Marmurowicz	LW	L	41	2005	Toruń, Poland
51	(Poland)	Daniel Minge	LW	L	37	2007	Toruń, Poland
23	(Slovakia)	Michal Mravec	LW	L	53	2007	Liptovský Mikuláš, Slovakia
4	(Finland)	Teemu Paakkarinen	LW	L	42	2008	Lappeenranta, Finland
14	(Poland)	Karol Piotrowski	D	L	42	2001	Toruń, Poland
1	(Poland)	Michał Plaskiewicz	G	L	42	2002	Toruń, Poland
89	(Poland)	Michał Porębski	D	L	37	2008	Warsaw, Poland
24	(Finland)	Sami Salonen	C	L	49	2008	Turku, Finland
21	(Poland)	Michał Wieczorek	RW	L	39	2005	Bydgoszcz, Poland
71	(Poland)	Mateusz Wiśniewski	RW	R	41	2007	Toruń, Poland

== Staff ==
- Head coach: Jarmo Tolvanen (Finland)
- Assistant: Andrzej Masewicz (Poland)
- Director: Jarosław Ciesielski (Poland)
- Doctor: Wojciech Piotrowski (Poland)
- Masseur: Bartosz Nienartowicz (Poland)

== See also ==
- Polska Hokej Liga
- Polish 1. Liga
