= Stoczniowiec Gdańsk =

- City: Gdańsk, Poland
- League: 1. Liga
- Founded: 1953; 73 years ago (Original), 2013; 13 years ago (Re-formed), 2021; 5 years ago (Re-formed)
- Folded: 2011; 15 years ago, 2021; 5 years ago
- Home arena: Hala Olivia
- Colours: Blue, Black

Stoczniowiec Gdańsk is an ice hockey team based in Gdańsk, Poland. The team currently plays in the 1. Liga, but has formerly spent 30 seasons playing in the Polska Hokej Liga, the top-level ice hockey league in Poland, with their highest finish of third place being achieved in 2003.

== History ==
The club was founded in 1953 by a group of workers from the Northern Shipyard as part of a bigger sports club. Initially the club used the name Polonia Gdańsk. They changed their name to Stoczniowiec Gdańsk in 1970 when the club officially became part of the newly created multi-sports club Stoczniowiec Gdańsk. In 1972 the club moved to their new home, Hala Olivia after the completion of the stadiums construction, and Stoczniowiec saw themselves playing in the Ekstraklasa for the first time.

In 2003 the club had its greatest success when it finished third in the league. This was a feat that the club could not replicate and in 2012 the team suffered financial difficulties and had to disband at the end of the season. In 2012 Hockey Club Gdańsk stated their intentions of being admitted to the 1. liga (second division) for the 2012–13 season, and agreed to take on Stoczniowiec's debt. Owing to Stoczniowiec being disbanded another club was set up, Pomeranian Hockey Club 2014 with the intention of continuing Stoczniowiec's traditions, however by the time PHC were officially organised and admitted into the league in 2014 Stoczniowiec had reformed.

In 2013 Stoczniowiec was reformed and in the process gained ownership of the company who owned Hockey Club Gdańsk, deciding to merge the two clubs together, officially taking on the name GKS Stoczniowiec. In 2017 the club returned to the 1. liga, and finished runners up in the league, securing promotion to Poland's top division. The team finished bottom of the league at the end of the 2020–21 season, with the Stoczniowiec Gdańsk sports club announcing that the ice hockey section of the sports club was to again be disbanded, in part due to the financial impact of the COVID-19 pandemic. The disbanding of Stoczniowiec Gdańsk would see all current players and staff losing their contracts, and the future of the club looking uncertain.

Before the season started in September 2021, Stoczniowiec had been restructured and had a team in place ready to take part in the 1. Liga. Stoczniowiec struggled the season after their relegation, winning only 9 points from 26 games, with 6 of these points coming from walkovers due to another team disbanding midway through the season.

== Honours ==
Stoczniowiec Gdańsk logo from 1970 to 2014

- Polska Hokej Liga
  - Third place: 2003
- Polish Cup
  - Runners-up: 2002, 2006, 2008
- Polish 1. Liga
  - Winners: 1976, 1981, 1983
  - Runners-up: 2020
- Baltic Cup
  - Winners: 2005
