= Naprzód Janów =

- City: Katowice, Poland
- League: Polska Hokej Liga
- Founded: 1920 (club); 1950 (ice hockey)
- Home arena: Jantor Janów
- Colours: Green, White, Black, Red
- General manager: (Poland) Janusz Imiołczyk
- Head coach: (Czech Republic) Josef Halouzka

Franchise history
- 1920-1962: Górnik Janów
- 1962-1998: Naprzód Janów
- 2004-present: Naprzód Janów

Naprzód Janów is an ice hockey team from the Janów neighbourhood of Katowice, Poland. They compete in the Polska Hokej Liga, the top level of ice hockey in Poland.

== History ==
The team was founded as Górnik Janów in 1920. In 1962, they were renamed their present name, Naprzód Janów. The club ceased to exist in 1998, but returned to the Polish 1. Liga in 2004, as a part amateur team. They won promotion to the PLH in 2006/2007, but were relegated during the 2010/2011 season due to financial troubles. In 2014, they returned to the top level, only to return to the Polish 1. Liga in 2016 after financial difficulties prevented them from playing in the PHL.

== Achievements ==
- Polish Cup champion (1): 1970.
- Polska Liga Hokejowa runner-up (7): 1950, 1952, 1971, 1973, 1977, 1989, 1992.
- Polish 1. Liga champions (3): 1962, 2014, 2017.
