= Podhale Nowy Targ =

- City: Nowy Targ, Poland
- League: Polska Hokej Liga
- Founded: 1932 (Original), 2015 (Current)
- Home arena: Miejska Hala Lodowa
- Colours: Yellow, blue, red
- General manager: Agata Michalska
- Head coach: Juraj Faith
- Website: podhalenowytarg.pl/kh

Franchise history
- 1932-1950: TS i KS Podhale Nowy Targ
- 1950-1954: Spójnia Nowy Targ
- 1954-1955: Sparta Nowy Targ
- 1955-2000: Podhale Nowy Targ
- 2000–2015: MMKS Podhale Nowy Targ
- 2015-present: Sportowej Spółki Akcyjnej KH Podhale Nowy Targ

Championships
- Playoff championships: 19 (1966, 1969, 1971, 1972, 1973, 1974, 1975, 1976, 1977, 1978, 1979, 1987, 1993, 1994, 1995, 1996, 1997, 2007, 2010)
- Polish Cups: 2 (2003, 2004)

Podhale Nowy Targ is a professional ice hockey team based in Nowy Targ, Poland. The team competes in the Polska Hokej Liga, the highest league in Poland. Legally, the team is known as SSA KH Podhale Nowy Targ, and TatrySki Podhale Nowy Targ for sponsorship reasons, while Tauron Podhale Nowy Targ is used from 2020.

== Home ice ==
- Name: Miejska Hala Lodowa w Nowym Targu
- Address: ul. Parkowa 14, 34-400 Nowy Targ, Poland
- Capacity: 3500

== Major achievements ==
- Polish Championships (19): 1966, 1969, 1971, 1972, 1973, 1974, 1975, 1976,1977, 1978, 1979, 1987, 1993, 1994, 1995, 1996, 1997, 2007, 2010.
- Polish Vice-Championships (11): 1963, 1964, 1970, 1980, 1981, 1982, 1986, 1990, 1998, 2000, 2004.
- Third place (12): 1958, 1960, 1961, 1962, 1984, 1985, 1991, 1992, 1999, 2006, 2008, 2009
- Polish Cup titles (2): 2004, 2005.
- Interliga Championship (1): 2004.

== Current squad (2024) ==
Goaltenders:

- Paweł Bizub

Defencemen:

- Dmitiri Zalmay
- Marcin Horzelski
- Marcin Kolusz
- Patryk Wajda
- Robert Mrugała

Forwards:

- Patryk Wronka
- Dominik Jarosz
- Patryk Pelaczyk
- Jean Dupuy
- Alexander Boivin
- Christian Mroczkowski
- Tomasz Szczerba
- Adrian Słowakiewicz
- Jakub Worwa
- Alexander Szczechura
