= Jakub Grof =

Czech ice hockey player

- Born: May 16, 1981 (age 45) Karlovy Vary, Czechoslovakia
- Height: 5 ft 10 in (178 cm)
- Weight: 179 lb (81 kg; 12 st 11 lb)
- Position: Defence
- Shot: Right
- Played for: HC Karlovy Vary; HC Zlín; SG Cortina; Orli Znojmo; GKS Katowice; JKH GKS Jastrzębie
- Playing career: 2000–2019

Jakub Grof (born May 16, 1981) is a Czech former professional ice hockey defenceman. He currently works as an assistant coach for HC Energie Karlovy Vary of the Czech Extraliga.

Grof played 186 games in the Czech Extraliga for HC Karlovy Vary and HC Zlín. He also played in the Elite.A for SG Cortina, the Austrian Hockey League for Orli Znojmo and the Polska Hokej Liga for GKS Katowice and JKH GKS Jastrzębie.

Grof played in the 2001 World Junior Ice Hockey Championships for the Czech Republic.

== Career statistics ==
| | | | Regular season | | | | | Playoffs |
| Season | Team | League | GP | G | A | Pts | PIM | GP | G | A | Pts | PIM |
|---|---|---|---|---|---|---|---|---|---|---|---|---|
| 2000–01 | HC Karlovy Vary | Czech | 26 | 1 | 3 | 4 | 22 | — | — | — | — | — |
| 2000–01 | SK Kadan | Czech2 | 4 | 0 | 0 | 0 | 4 | — | — | — | — | — |
| 2001–02 | HC Karlovy Vary | Czech | 20 | 2 | 1 | 3 | 16 | — | — | — | — | — |
| 2001–02 | KLH Chomutov | Czech2 | 8 | 0 | 1 | 1 | 10 | 9 | 1 | 1 | 2 | 10 |
| 2001–02 | HC Banik Sokolov | Czech3 | 3 | 0 | 3 | 3 | 4 | — | — | — | — | — |
| 2002–03 | HC Karlovy Vary | Czech | 10 | 1 | 0 | 1 | 4 | — | — | — | — | — |
| 2002–03 | KLH Chomutov | Czech2 | 2 | 0 | 0 | 0 | 2 | — | — | — | — | — |
| 2002–03 | HC Berounsti Medvedi | Czech2 | 17 | 1 | 1 | 2 | 2 | — | — | — | — | — |
| 2003–04 | HC Karlovy Vary | Czech | 1 | 0 | 0 | 0 | 0 | — | — | — | — | — |
| 2003–04 | HC Olomouc | Czech2 | 31 | 5 | 5 | 10 | 39 | 2 | 0 | 1 | 1 | 2 |
| 2004–05 | HC Sareza Ostrava | Czech2 | 46 | 11 | 15 | 26 | 59 | 1 | 0 | 0 | 0 | 0 |
| 2005–06 | HC Slovan Ústečtí Lvi | Czech2 | 45 | 8 | 14 | 22 | 24 | 11 | 0 | 4 | 4 | 6 |
| 2006–07 | HC Slovan Ústečtí Lvi | Czech2 | 35 | 11 | 19 | 30 | 38 | 12 | 5 | 4 | 9 | 10 |
| 2007–08 | HC Karlovy Vary | Czech | 51 | 7 | 11 | 18 | 24 | 19 | 3 | 1 | 4 | 16 |
| 2008–09 | HC Karlovy Vary | Czech | 25 | 2 | 2 | 4 | 12 | — | — | — | — | — |
| 2008–09 | KLH Chomutov | Czech2 | 12 | 2 | 3 | 5 | 18 | 11 | 2 | 1 | 3 | 0 |
| 2008–09 | HC Most | Czech2 | 6 | 0 | 4 | 4 | 8 | — | — | — | — | — |
| 2009–10 | KLH Chomutov | Czech2 | 42 | 7 | 16 | 23 | 64 | 16 | 3 | 8 | 11 | 26 |
| 2010–11 | HC Zlin | Czech | 34 | 3 | 7 | 10 | 20 | — | — | — | — | — |
| 2010–11 | KLH Chomutov | Czech2 | 12 | 2 | 2 | 4 | 4 | 12 | 1 | 5 | 6 | 16 |
| 2011–12 | Pirati Chomutov | Czech2 | 51 | 3 | 23 | 26 | 36 | 19 | 4 | 9 | 13 | 6 |
| 2012–13 | Landshut Cannibals | Germany2 | 48 | 8 | 20 | 28 | 32 | 6 | 1 | 3 | 4 | 8 |
| 2013–14 | SG Cortina | Italy | 41 | 8 | 24 | 32 | 28 | 10 | 0 | 5 | 5 | 16 |
| 2014–15 | Orli Znojmo | EBEL | 44 | 7 | 16 | 23 | 44 | — | — | — | — | — |
| 2015–16 | HC ZUBR Přerov | Czech2 | 47 | 7 | 19 | 26 | 54 | 5 | 2 | 3 | 5 | 0 |
| Czech totals | | | 167 | 16 | 24 | 40 | 98 | 19 | 3 | 1 | 4 | 16 |
| Czech2 totals | | | 358 | 57 | 122 | 179 | 362 | 98 | 18 | 36 | 54 | 76 |
