= Branislav Fábry =

Slovak ice hockey player

- Born: January 15, 1985 (age 41) Bratislava, Czechoslovakia
- Height: 6 ft 1 in (185 cm)
- Weight: 194 lb (88 kg; 13 st 12 lb)
- Position: Forward
- Shoots: Left
- team Former teams: Free agent HC Slovan Bratislava; MsHK Žilina; HC Znojemští Orli; MHK Kezmarok; Orlik Opole; HC Nové Zámky; HC Topoľčany; HK Delikateso Bratislava; HK Levice
- NHL draft: 65th overall, 2003; Buffalo Sabres
- Playing career: 2003–present

Branislav Fábry (born January 15, 1985) is a Slovak professional ice hockey player who currently is a free agent. He lastly played for HK Levice in Tipos SHL. He was drafted by the Buffalo Sabres in the second round, 65th overall, of the 2003 NHL entry draft, however never pursued a North American career.

He has formerly played with HC Slovan Bratislava in the Slovak Extraliga. and HC Znojemští Orli in the past. Before enduring a stint with KLH Chomutov in the First National Hockey League.

His father was also a hockey player, and played the Junior Extraliga of ice hockey in Czechoslovakia.

== Career statistics ==
=== Regular season and playoffs ===
			Regular season					Playoffs
Season	Team	League	GP	G	A	Pts	PIM	GP	G	A	Pts	PIM
2002–03	HC Slovan Bratislava	SVK U18	11	4	5	9	28	—	—	—	—	—
2002–03	HC Slovan Bratislava	SVK	8	0	0	0	0	—	—	—	—	—
2003–04	HC Slovan Bratislava	SVK U20	14	8	6	14	22	8	8	7	15	10
2003–04	HC Slovan Bratislava	SVK	44	1	6	7	2	5	0	0	0	0
2004–05	HC Slovan Bratislava	SVK U20	21	9	12	21	44	3	1	0	1	0
2004–05	HC Slovan Bratislava	SVK	10	0	0	0	0	—	—	—	—	—
2004–05	MsHK Žilina	SVK	12	0	1	1	2	—	—	—	—	—
2004–05	HK Trnava	SVK.2	11	3	4	7	2	—	—	—	—	—
2005–06	HK Lietajúce kone Prešov	SVK.2	13	4	7	11	10	5	0	1	1	18
2006–07	HC Znojemští Orli	ELH	2	0	0	0	0	—	—	—	—	—
2006–07	HC Rebel Havlíčkův Brod	CZE.2	39	5	2	7	59	—	—	—	—	—
2007–08	MHK SkiPark Kežmarok	SVK	10	0	0	0	6	—	—	—	—	—
2007–08	HK Ružinov 99 Bratislava	SVK.2	7	2	0	2	16	—	—	—	—	—
2007–08	SK Kadaň	CZE.2	10	3	4	7	22	3	0	0	0	2
2008–09	KLH Chomutov	CZE.2	42	5	6	11	12	—	—	—	—	—
2008–09	SK Kadaň	CZE.2	—	—	—	—	—	4	4	0	4	4
2009–10	SK Kadaň	CZE.2	19	1	1	2	4	—	—	—	—	—
2009–10	Újpesti TE	HUN	14	11	8	19	67	—	—	—	—	—
2010–11	Rönnängs IK	SWE.4	17	13	17	30	8	6	5	5	10	4
2011–12	Yertis Pavlodar	KAZ	38	12	14	26	20	5	0	0	0	0
2012–13	Yertis Pavlodar	KAZ	9	0	1	1	8	5	0	0	0	0
2013–14	TMH Polonia Bytom	POL	35	14	21	35	59	3	2	0	2	2
2014–15	TMH Polonia Bytom	POL	23	10	15	25	22	—	—	—	—	—
2014–15	Orlik Opole	POL	22	12	20	32	32	3	1	1	2	2
2015–16	Orlik Opole	POL	22	9	11	20	8	—	—	—	—	—
2015–16	HC Nové Zámky	SVK.2	22	9	9	18	28	2	1	0	1	4
2016–17	HC Nové Zámky	SVK	56	5	11	16	36	5	0	0	0	6
2017–18	HC Nové Zámky	SVK	55	5	8	13	38	4	1	1	2	16
2018–19	HC Nové Zámky	SVK	57	9	7	16	40	4	0	0	0	0
2018–19	HC Nové Zámky B	SVK.2	3	1	3	4	4	—	—	—	—	—
2019–20	HC Nové Zámky	SVK	55	2	9	11	85	—	—	—	—	—
2020–21	HC Topoľčany	SVK.2	10	1	1	2	10	—	—	—	—	—
SVK totals			307	22	42	64	209	18	1	1	2	22
CZE.2 totals			110	14	13	27	97	7	4	0	4	6
POL totals			102	45	67	112	121	6	3	1	4	4

=== International ===
Year	Team	Event	GP	G	A	Pts	PIM
2003	Slovakia	WJC18	7	3	2	5	2
2004	Slovakia	WJC	6	3	1	4	0
2005	Slovakia	WJC	6	0	1	1	2
Junior totals			19	6	4	10	4
