= Roman Němeček =

Czech ice hockey player

- Born: January 10, 1980 (age 46) Písek, Czechoslovakia
- Height: 6 ft 1 in (185 cm)
- Weight: 209 lb (95 kg; 14 st 13 lb)
- Position: Defence
- Shot: Right
- Czech Extraliga team: HC Vítkovice
- Playing career: 2000–2020

Roman Němeček (born January 10, 1980) is a Czech professional ice hockey defenceman. He played with HC Vítkovice in the Czech Extraliga during the 2010–11 Czech Extraliga season.

== Career statistics ==
			Regular season					Playoffs
Season	Team	League	GP	G	A	Pts	PIM	GP	G	A	Pts	PIM
1999–00	IHC Písek U20	Czech U20	28	2	0	2	51	—	—	—	—	—
2000–01	IHC Písek U20	Czech U20 2	14	3	5	8	18	6	2	5	7	41
2000–01	IHC Písek	Czech2	16	0	1	1	2	1	0	0	0	2
2000–01	HC ZVVZ Milevsko	Czech3	7	2	1	3	31	—	—	—	—	—
2001–02	IHC Písek	Czech2	34	2	2	4	26	—	—	—	—	—
2001–02	HC ZVVZ Milevsko	Czech3	2	0	0	0	0	—	—	—	—	—
2002–03	HC Znojemští Orli	Czech	2	0	0	0	2	2	0	0	0	0
2002–03	IHC Písek	Czech2	40	4	6	10	24	4	0	1	1	65,535
2003–04	HC Znojemští Orli	Czech	30	0	2	2	14	1	0	0	0	0
2003–04	IHC Písek	Czech2	5	0	1	1	25	—	—	—	—	—
2004–05	HC Znojemští Orli	Czech	30	2	2	4	16	—	—	—	—	—
2004–05	HC Olomouc	Czech2	12	0	1	1	20	—	—	—	—	—
2005–06	HC Znojemští Orli	Czech	51	3	10	13	36	11	0	1	1	6
2006–07	HC Znojemští Orli	Czech	52	2	2	4	36	10	0	1	1	6
2007–08	HC Slavia Praha	Czech	47	0	1	1	22	—	—	—	—	—
2007–08	HC Slovan Ústečtí Lvi	Czech	5	0	1	1	2	—	—	—	—	—
2008–09	HC Slovan Ústečtí Lvi	Czech2	44	6	12	18	24	17	2	5	7	18
2009–10	HC Vítkovice	Czech	1	0	0	0	0	—	—	—	—	—
2009–10	BK Mladá Boleslav	Czech	7	0	1	1	4	—	—	—	—	—
2009–10	HC Slovan Ústečtí Lvi	Czech2	45	6	23	29	63	17	2	7	9	24
2010–11	HC Vítkovice	Czech	1	0	0	0	0	—	—	—	—	—
2010–11	HC Slovan Ústečtí Lvi	Czech2	43	4	11	15	26	—	—	—	—	—
2011–12	HC Mountfield	Czech	32	2	3	5	10	5	1	0	1	0
2011–12	IHC Písek	Czech2	24	2	8	10	10	—	—	—	—	—
2012–13	BK Mladá Boleslav	Czech2	51	6	10	16	48	10	1	2	3	8
2013–14	BK Mladá Boleslav	Czech2	49	4	15	19	24	7	1	0	1	6
2014–15	JKH GKS Jastrzębie	Poland	45	4	13	17	20	14	3	2	5	10
2015–16	Black Dragons Erfurt	Germany3	28	6	13	19	18	—	—	—	—	—
2015–16	IHC Písek	Czech3	6	0	0	0	0	—	—	—	—	—
2016–17	ESC Vilshofen	Germany5	—	—	—	—	—	—	—	—	—	—
2017–18	EHF Passau Black Hawks	Germany4	26	14	21	35	14	9	3	7	10	6
2018–19	EHF Passau Black Hawks	Germany4	26	5	15	20	28	—	—	—	—	—
2019–20	ESC Vilshofen	Germany5	—	—	—	—	—	—	—	—	—	—
Czech totals			258	9	22	31	142	29	1	2	3	12
Czech2 totals			363	34	90	124	292	56	6	15	21	65,593
