= Jan Látal =

Czech ice hockey player

- Born: March 21, 1990 (age 36) Středokluky, Czechoslovakia
- Height: 6 ft 0 in (183 cm)
- Weight: 176 lb (80 kg; 12 st 8 lb)
- Position: Defence
- Shot: Right
- Czech Extraliga team: HC Karlovy Vary
- Playing career: 2009–2010

Jan Látal (born March 21, 1990) is a Czech professional ice hockey defenceman. He played with HC Karlovy Vary in the Czech Extraliga during the 2010–11 Czech Extraliga season.

== Career statistics ==
			Regular season					Playoffs
Season	Team	League	GP	G	A	Pts	PIM	GP	G	A	Pts	PIM
2005–06	HC Kladno U18	Czech U18	33	0	1	1	22	2	0	0	0	0
2006–07	HC Kladno U18	Czech U18	37	8	10	18	52	7	0	0	0	20
2007–08	HC Kladno U20	Czech U20	28	2	3	5	24	—	—	—	—	—
2008–09	Plymouth Whalers	OHL	28	1	1	2	25	—	—	—	—	—
2009–10	HC Kladno U20	Czech U20	29	5	18	23	48	—	—	—	—	—
2009–10	SK Horácká Slavia Třebíč	Czech2	1	0	0	0	0	—	—	—	—	—
2009–10	Stjernen Hockey	Norway	8	0	0	0	10	3	0	0	0	0
2009–10	Stjernen Hockey 2	Norway2	2	1	1	2	0	—	—	—	—	—
2010–11	HC Berounští Medvědi	Czech2	33	1	4	5	82	4	0	0	0	2
2010–11	HC Energie Karlovy Vary	Czech	2	0	0	0	0	—	—	—	—	—
2011–12	HC Energie Karlovy Vary	Czech	11	0	1	1	2	—	—	—	—	—
2011–12	HC Most	Czech2	28	3	5	8	62	—	—	—	—	—
2011–12	SK Kadaň	Czech2	4	0	0	0	2	—	—	—	—	—
2012–13	HC Energie Karlovy Vary	Czech	50	0	5	5	22	—	—	—	—	—
2012–13	HC Most	Czech2	2	0	0	0	2	—	—	—	—	—
2013–14	HC Energie Karlovy Vary	Czech	3	0	1	1	2	—	—	—	—	—
2013–14	HC Berounští Medvědi	Czech2	26	0	0	0	37	—	—	—	—	—
2014–15	Rytíři Kladno	Czech2	15	0	1	1	59	—	—	—	—	—
2014–15	LHK Jestřábi Prostějov	Czech2	3	0	0	0	0	—	—	—	—	—
2015–16	Draci Šumperk	Czech2	6	0	0	0	6	—	—	—	—	—
2015–16	HC Slovan Ústí nad Labem	Czech2	12	1	0	1	4	—	—	—	—	—
2015–16	JKH GKS Jastrzębie	Poland	9	0	0	0	6	3	0	0	0	2
2016–17	JKH GKS Jastrzębie	Poland	28	5	15	20	24	5	0	0	0	0
2017–18	Orlik Opole	Poland	17	0	11	11	16	—	—	—	—	—
2017–18	HC Nove Zamky	Slovak	15	0	1	1	2	—	—	—	—	—
2017–18	HC Nove Zamky B	Slovak2	1	0	1	1	0	—	—	—	—	—
2018–19	HC Slovan Ústí nad Labem	Czech2	14	1	1	2	8	—	—	—	—	—
2018–19	ECDC Memmingen	Germany3	24	5	5	10	26	3	0	1	1	4
Czech totals			66	0	7	7	26	—	—	—	—	—
Czech2 totals			144	6	11	17	262	4	0	0	0	2
Poland totals			54	5	26	31	46	8	0	0	0	2
