= Tomáš Protivný =

Czech ice hockey player

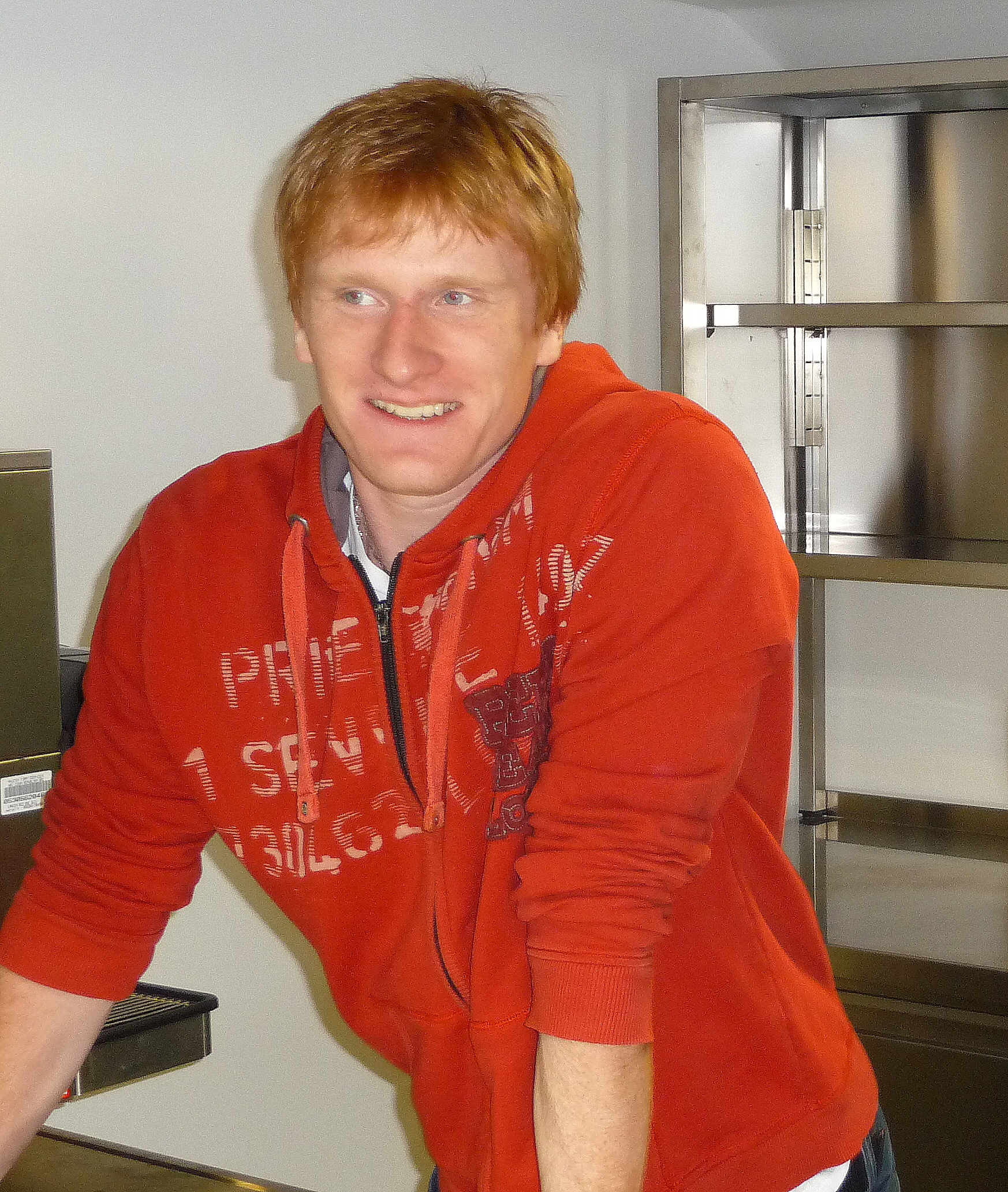
- Born: January 24, 1986 (age 40) Nymburk, Czechoslovakia
- Height: 6 ft 1 in (185 cm)
- Weight: 203 lb (92 kg; 14 st 7 lb)
- Position: Defence
- Shot: Left
- Played for: HC Sparta Praha; HC Kometa Brno; JKH GKS Jastrzębie
- Playing career: 2003–2017

Tomáš Protivný (born January 24, 1986) is a Czech former professional ice hockey defenceman.

Protivný played in the Czech Extraliga with HC Sparta Praha and HC Kometa Brno. He also played in the Polska Hokej Liga for JKH GKS Jastrzębie.

== Career statistics ==
| | | | Regular season | | | | | Playoffs |
| Season | Team | League | GP | G | A | Pts | PIM | GP | G | A | Pts | PIM |
|---|---|---|---|---|---|---|---|---|---|---|---|---|
| 2000–01 | HC Sparta Praha U18 | Czech U18 | 45 | 1 | 10 | 11 | 43 | — | — | — | — | — |
| 2001–02 | HC Sparta Praha U18 | Czech U18 | 33 | 3 | 9 | 12 | 36 | 5 | 0 | 0 | 0 | 0 |
| 2002–03 | HC Sparta Praha U18 | Czech U18 | 44 | 3 | 8 | 11 | 141 | 1 | 0 | 0 | 0 | 2 |
| 2002–03 | HC Sparta Praha U20 | Czech U20 | 1 | 0 | 0 | 0 | 0 | — | — | — | — | — |
| 2002–03 | NED Hockey Numburk | Czech3 | 2 | 0 | 0 | 0 | — | 1 | 0 | 0 | 0 | — |
| 2003–04 | HC Dukla Jihlava U20 | Czech U20 2 | — | — | — | — | — | — | — | — | — | — |
| 2003–04 | HC Sparta Praha U20 | Czech U20 | 50 | 4 | 4 | 8 | 76 | — | — | — | — | — |
| 2003–04 | NED Hockey Nymburk | Czech3 | 2 | 0 | 0 | 0 | 2 | 1 | 0 | 0 | 0 | 0 |
| 2004–05 | HC Sparta Praha U20 | Czech U20 | 45 | 7 | 11 | 18 | 38 | 8 | 0 | 1 | 1 | 6 |
| 2004–05 | NED Hockey Nymburk | Czech3 | 2 | 0 | 0 | 0 | 12 | 1 | 0 | 0 | 0 | 0 |
| 2005–06 | HC Olomouc U20 | Czech U20 | 10 | 1 | 1 | 2 | 18 | — | — | — | — | — |
| 2005–06 | HC Olomouc | Czech2 | 41 | 0 | 0 | 0 | 22 | 1 | 0 | 0 | 0 | 2 |
| 2006–07 | HC Sparta Praha | Czech | 27 | 0 | 2 | 2 | 10 | 8 | 0 | 0 | 0 | 4 |
| 2006–07 | HC Berounští Medvědi | Czech2 | 11 | 1 | 1 | 2 | 46 | — | — | — | — | — |
| 2007–08 | HC Sparta Praha | Czech | 12 | 0 | 0 | 0 | 10 | — | — | — | — | — |
| 2007–08 | HC Hradec Králové | Czech2 | 10 | 0 | 0 | 0 | 24 | — | — | — | — | — |
| 2007–08 | HC Kometa Brno | Czech2 | 3 | 0 | 1 | 1 | 12 | 13 | 0 | 3 | 3 | 26 |
| 2007–08 | HC Benátky nad Jizerou | Czech3 | 12 | 1 | 3 | 4 | 58 | — | — | — | — | — |
| 2008–09 | HC Kometa Brno | Czech2 | 28 | 0 | 0 | 0 | 14 | — | — | — | — | — |
| 2008–09 | SHK Hodonín | Czech3 | 26 | 8 | 12 | 20 | 134 | 3 | 0 | 0 | 0 | 6 |
| 2009–10 | HC Kometa Brno | Czech | 7 | 0 | 1 | 1 | 0 | — | — | — | — | — |
| 2009–10 | Orli Znojmo | Czech2 | 41 | 6 | 10 | 16 | 68 | 8 | 1 | 1 | 2 | 16 |
| 2010–11 | HC Kometa Brno | Czech | 38 | 0 | 1 | 1 | 57 | — | — | — | — | — |
| 2011–12 | HC Kometa Brno | Czech | 2 | 0 | 0 | 0 | 2 | — | — | — | — | — |
| 2011–12 | HC Havlíčkův Brod | Czech2 | 50 | 5 | 6 | 11 | 52 | 5 | 1 | 0 | 1 | 4 |
| 2012–13 | HC Havlíčkův Brod | Czech2 | 50 | 7 | 9 | 16 | 85 | 4 | 0 | 0 | 0 | 8 |
| 2013–14 | BK Mladá Boleslav | Czech2 | 45 | 4 | 9 | 13 | 68 | 6 | 0 | 1 | 1 | 2 |
| 2014–15 | JKH GKS Jastrzębie | Poland | 38 | 4 | 15 | 19 | 56 | 14 | 1 | 3 | 4 | 10 |
| 2015–16 | LHK Jestřábi Prostějov | Czech2 | 50 | 4 | 15 | 19 | 64 | 4 | 0 | 0 | 0 | 6 |
| 2016–17 | LHK Jestřábi Prostějov | Czech2 | 49 | 3 | 14 | 17 | 60 | 4 | 1 | 0 | 1 | 2 |
| Czech totals | | | 86 | 0 | 4 | 4 | 79 | 8 | 0 | 0 | 0 | 4 |
| Czech2 totals | | | 378 | 30 | 65 | 95 | 515 | 45 | 3 | 5 | 8 | 66 |
