= Patrik Flašar =

Czech ice hockey player

- Born: April 4, 1987 (age 38) Ostrava, Czechoslovakia
- Height: 5 ft 11 in (180 cm)
- Weight: 187 lb (85 kg; 13 st 5 lb)
- Position: Defence
- Shot: Left
- Czech Extraliga team: HC Vítkovice
- Playing career: 2004–2017

Patrik Flašar (born April 4, 1987) is a Czech professional ice hockey defenceman. He played with HC Vítkovice in the Czech Extraliga during the 2010–11 Czech Extraliga season.

== Career statistics ==
			Regular season					Playoffs
Season	Team	League	GP	G	A	Pts	PIM	GP	G	A	Pts	PIM
2002–03	HC Vitkovice U18	Czech U18	20	0	6	6	18	—	—	—	—	—
2002–03	HC Slezan Opava U18	Czech U18	11	1	2	3	10	—	—	—	—	—
2003–04	HC Slezan Opava U18	Czech U18	25	2	8	10	73	—	—	—	—	—
2003–04	HC Slezan Opava U20	Czech U20	21	0	2	2	16	—	—	—	—	—
2004–05	HC Havirov U20	Czech U20	42	0	5	5	77	3	0	0	0	2
2004–05	HC Havirov Panthers	Czech2	6	0	0	0	4	—	—	—	—	—
2005–06	HC Vitkovice U20	Czech U20	43	2	8	10	127	5	0	4	4	16
2005–06	HK Jestřábi Prostějov	Czech2	4	1	0	1	8	—	—	—	—	—
2006–07	HC Vitkovice U20	Czech U20	4	0	2	2	10	3	0	1	1	6
2006–07	HK Jestřábi Prostějov	Czech2	36	2	2	4	40	—	—	—	—	—
2007–08	Unia Oświęcim	Poland	—	—	—	—	—	—	—	—	—	—
2008–09	HC Hradec Králové	Czech2	12	1	0	1	12	—	—	—	—	—
2008–09	MHK Kežmarok	Slovak	31	0	4	4	22	—	—	—	—	—
2009–10	HC Vrchlabí	Czech2	8	0	0	0	12	—	—	—	—	—
2009–10	LHK Jestřábi Prostějov	Czech3	15	0	1	1	26	—	—	—	—	—
2010–11	HC Vitkovice	Czech	—	—	—	—	—	—	—	—	—	—
2010–11	HC Plus Oil Orlová	Czech3	23	4	11	15	16	—	—	—	—	—
2010–11	Unia Oświęcim	Poland	11	2	2	4	4	11	3	0	3	10
2011–12	Hammer Eisbären	Germany3	33	7	21	28	74	9	1	5	6	12
2012–13	EV Regensburg	Germany3	34	1	10	11	38	—	—	—	—	—
2012–13	HC Karvina	Czech3	5	1	0	1	18	8	1	2	3	14
2013–14	Polonia Bytom	Poland	17	1	1	2	14	—	—	—	—	—
2013–14	JKH GKS Jastrzebie	Poland	30	2	5	7	24	11	1	2	3	4
2014–15	HK Novy Jicin	Czech3	34	5	14	19	74	3	0	0	0	33
2015–16	HK Novy Jicin	Czech3	32	3	13	16	78	—	—	—	—	—
2016–17	HC Poruba 2011	Czech3	32	3	10	13	14	2	0	0	0	2
Czech2 totals			66	4	2	6	76	—	—	—	—	—
Czech3 totals			141	16	49	65	226	13	1	2	3	49
