= Krzysztof Oliwa =

Polish ice hockey player

- Born: April 12, 1973 (age 53) Tychy, Poland
- Height: 6 ft 5 in (196 cm)
- Weight: 245 lb (111 kg; 17 st 7 lb)
- Position: Left wing
- Shot: Left
- Played for: GKS Katowice; GKS Tychy; New Jersey Devils; Columbus Blue Jackets; Pittsburgh Penguins; New York Rangers; Boston Bruins; Calgary Flames; Podhale Nowy Targ
- National team: Poland
- NHL draft: 65th overall, 1993; New Jersey Devils
- Playing career: 1993–2006

Krzysztof Artur Oliwa (pronounced [ˈkʂɨʂtɔf ˈartur ɔˈliva]; born April 12, 1973) is a Polish former professional ice hockey player. A left winger, he played eight seasons in the National Hockey League. To date, he is the only player from Poland with his name inscribed on the Stanley Cup, as a member of the New Jersey Devils' 2000 championship team.

== Playing career ==
Nicknamed "the Polish Hammer", Oliwa was a big (6' 5"), intimidating, physical player who played the role of an enforcer. After Mario Lemieux returned from retirement, Oliwa was picked up to protect Lemieux.

Born in Tychy, Poland, Oliwa played in the GKS Tychy youth system. He played one season in the Polish Junior League with Katowice, joining the Polish Under-18 team for the European Under-18 championship. Oliwa then graduated to the senior Tychy team in the Polish League for the 1991-92 season. Oliwa was named to the Polish national junior team for the 1992 IIHF U-20 Division 1 tournament. During his teenage years in Poland, Oliwa worked full-time in a coal mine, followed by a daily hockey practice. With a goal of making the NHL, Oliwa played the 1992-93 season in Canada for the Welland Flames junior team to adapt to the North American style of play.

Oliwa was drafted 65th overall in the 1993 NHL entry draft by the New Jersey Devils. He joined the Devils organization immediately, playing for their minor league teams from 1993 until 1997. Oliwa made his NHL debut as a callup on March 9, 1997, and made the Devils full-time in the 1997-98 season. He played three full seasons for the Devils, culminating in the Devils' 1999-2000 championship season. Just before the playoffs, Oliwa suffered a serious knee injury. Against the team's wishes, which wanted him to play in the playoffs, Oliwa had surgery and did not participate in the 2000 playoffs. However, Oliwa played enough regular season games to qualify to have his name inscribed on the Stanley Cup, making him the first player born and trained in Poland to have this honor.

Although still recovering from his knee surgery, in June 2000, Oliwa was traded to the expansion Columbus Blue Jackets. He only played ten games for the team before breaking his arm. He was then traded to the Pittsburgh Penguins to finish the season. Oliwa played a second season for the Penguins before being traded to the New York Rangers. His stay with the Rangers was brief. In his ninth game with the Rangers, Oliwa was suspended two games for his part in an on-ice brawl. After his suspension ended, he was a healthy scratch for six games, then placed on waivers. He cleared waivers and was demoted to the Rangers' AHL Hartford Wolf Pack team. In January 2003, Oliwa was traded to the Boston Bruins for a ninth-round draft pick, and appeared in 33 games for the Bruins. As a free agent, he joined the Calgary Flames for 2003-04 on a one-year contract. He signed with the Devils as a free agent after the 2003–04 season, however the NHL lockout intervened and Oliwa played a season in Poland during the lockout. After the lockout, in the 2005–06 season, Oliwa was waived by the Devils to make room for Patrik Elias under the new salary cap. After clearing waivers, the Devils chose not to demote Oliwa to their minor league team in Albany and instead sent him home. Under the rules at the time, half of Oliwa's salary would have counted against the Devils' salary cap should he have been recalled and claimed by another team. Oliwa did not play again in the NHL. He retired at the end of the 2005–06 season.

== Coaching career ==
After retiring, Oliwa took up the position of head coach of the Polish National Hockey Program for a season. Later, Oliwa owned, managed and coached the USPHL Kalkaska Rhinos junior hockey team. He also was the coach and general manager of the Walnut Grove Wolverines of the Canadian Independent Junior League.

== Career statistics ==
=== Regular season and playoffs ===
			Regular season					Playoffs
Season	Team	League	GP	G	A	Pts	PIM	GP	G	A	Pts	PIM
1990–91	GKS Katowice	POL	5	4	4	8	10	—	—	—	—	—
1991–92	GKS Tychy	POL	10	3	7	10	6	—	—	—	—	—
1992–93	Welland Flames	GHJHL	30	13	21	34	127	—	—	—	—	—
1993–94	Albany River Rats	AHL	33	2	4	6	151	—	—	—	—	—
1993–94	Raleigh IceCaps	ECHL	15	0	2	2	65	9	0	0	0	35
1994–95	Saint John Flames	AHL	14	1	4	5	79	—	—	—	—	—
1994–95	Detroit Vipers	IHL	4	0	1	1	24	—	—	—	—	—
1994–95	Albany River Rats	AHL	20	1	1	2	77	—	—	—	—	—
1994–95	Raleigh IceCaps	ECHL	5	0	2	2	32	—	—	—	—	—
1995–96	Albany River Rats	AHL	51	5	11	16	217	—	—	—	—	—
1995–96	Raleigh IceCaps	ECHL	9	1	0	1	53	—	—	—	—	—
1996–97	New Jersey Devils	NHL	1	0	0	0	5	—	—	—	—	—
1996–97	Albany River Rats	AHL	60	13	14	27	322	15	7	1	8	49
1997–98	New Jersey Devils	NHL	73	2	3	5	295	6	0	0	0	23
1998–99	New Jersey Devils	NHL	64	5	7	12	240	1	0	0	0	2
1999–00	New Jersey Devils	NHL	69	6	10	16	184	—	—	—	—	—
2000–01	Columbus Blue Jackets	NHL	10	0	2	2	34	—	—	—	—	—
2000–01	Pittsburgh Penguins	NHL	26	1	2	3	131	5	0	0	0	16
2001–02	Pittsburgh Penguins	NHL	57	0	2	2	150	—	—	—	—	—
2002–03	New York Rangers	NHL	9	0	0	0	51	—	—	—	—	—
2002–03	Hartford Wolf Pack	AHL	15	0	1	1	30	—	—	—	—	—
2002–03	Boston Bruins	NHL	33	0	0	0	110	—	—	—	—	—
2003–04	Calgary Flames	NHL	65	3	2	5	247	20	2	0	2	6
2004–05	Podhale Nowy Targ	POL	—	—	—	—	—	2	0	0	0	12
2005–06	New Jersey Devils	NHL	3	0	0	0	0	—	—	—	—	—
NHL totals			410	17	28	45	1447	32	2	0	2	47
AHL totals			197	22	36	58	876	24	7	1	8	84

=== International ===
Year	Team	Event	GP	G	A	Pts	PIM
1991	Poland	EJC	5	0	2	2	6
1992	Poland	WJC B	6	1	1	2	14
2002	Poland	WC	6	1	2	3	22
2005	Poland	OGQ	6	1	1	2	34
Junior totals			11	1	2	3	20
Senior totals			12	2	3	5	56

== Awards and honors ==
Award	Year
NHL
Stanley Cup champion (New Jersey Devils)	2000

== Transactions ==
- June 12, 2000 – Traded to Columbus by New Jersey with future considerations (Deron Quint, June 23, 2000) for Columbus' third-round choice (Brandon Nolan) in 2001 Entry Draft and future considerations (Turner Stevenson, June 23, 2000).
- January 14, 2001 – Traded to Pittsburgh by Columbus for San Jose's third-round choice (previously acquired, Columbus selected Aaron Johnson) in 2001 Entry Draft.
- June 23, 2002 – Traded to the New York Rangers by Pittsburgh for the Rangers' ninth-round choice (later traded to Tampa Bay - Tampa Bay selected Albert Vishnyakov) in 2003 Entry Draft.
- January 6, 2003 – Traded to Boston by NY Rangers for Boston's ninth-round choice (later traded to San Jose - San Jose selected Brian Mahoney-Wilson) in 2004 Entry Draft.
- July 30, 2003 – Signed as a free agent by Calgary.
- July 15, 2004 – Signed as a free agent by New Jersey.
- October 1, 2004 – Signed as a free agent by Nowy Targ (Poland).
