= Ivo Kotaška =

Czech ice hockey player

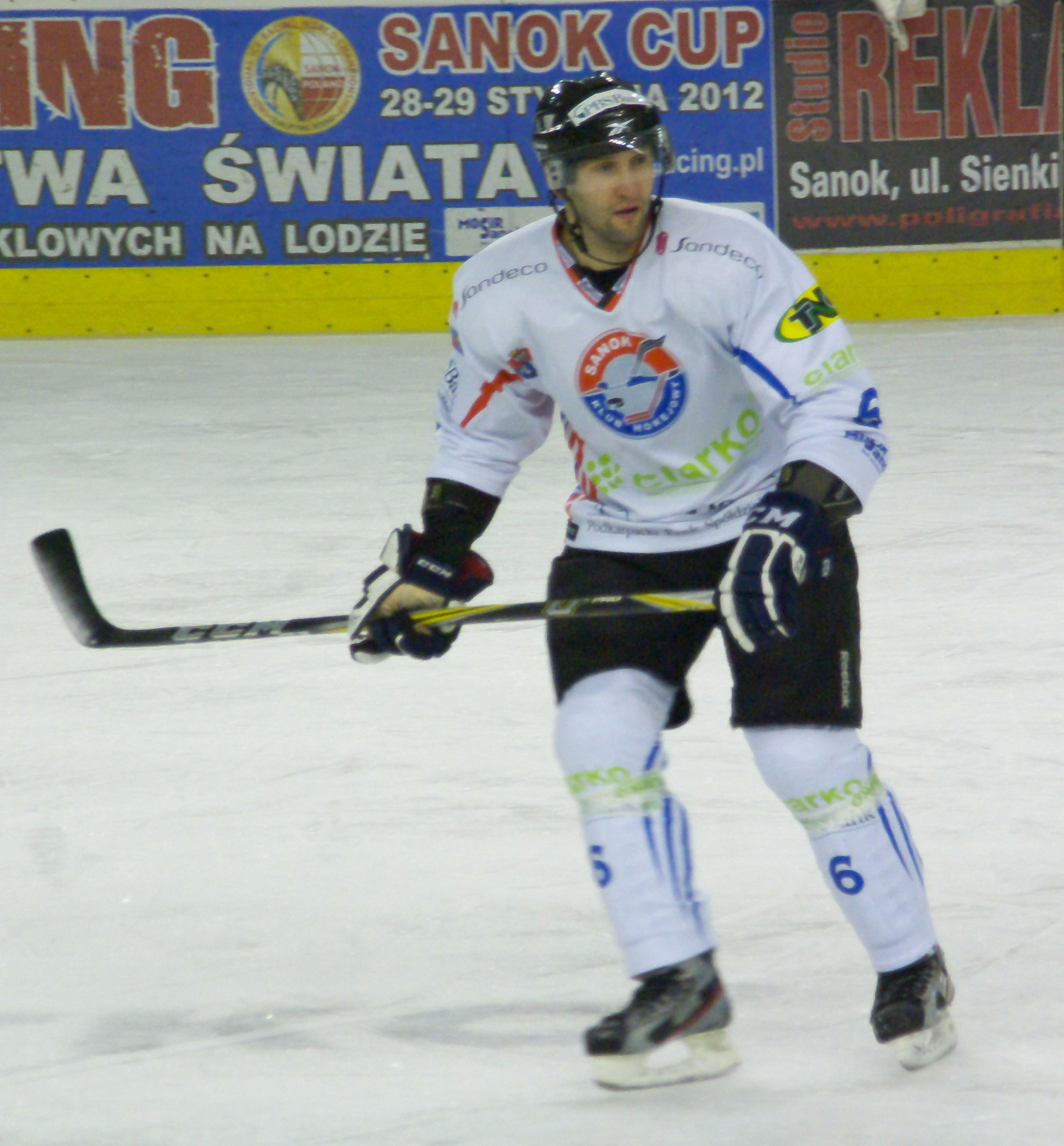
- Born: January 26, 1980 (age 45); České Budějovice, Czechoslovakia
- Height: 5 ft 11 in (180 cm)
- Weight: 187 lb (85 kg; 13 st 5 lb)
- Position: Defence
- Shoots: Right
- team Former teams: Free agent Czech Extraliga; HC České Budějovice; VHK Vsetín; Znojemsti Excalibur Orli; Slovak Extraliga; HC Slovan Bratislava; ŠHK 37 Piešťany
- NHL draft: Undrafted
- Playing career: 2000–present

Ivo Kotaška (born January 26, 1980) is a Czech professional ice hockey defenceman.

He has played in the Czech Extraliga for HC České Budějovice, VHK Vsetín and Znojemsti Excalibur Orli. He has also played in the Tipsport Liga for HC Slovan Bratislava and ŠHK 37 Piešťany.

Kotaška previously played for IHC Písek, HC Olomouc and HC Tábor.

== Career statistics ==
			Regular season					Playoffs
Season	Team	League	GP	G	A	Pts	PIM	GP	G	A	Pts	PIM
1998–99	Motor České Budějovice U20	Czech U20	—	—	—	—	—	—	—	—	—	—
1999–00	HC Ceske Budejovice U20	Czech U20	26	2	11	13	10	—	—	—	—	—
2000–01	HC Ceske Budejovice U20	Czech U20	35	8	10	18	18	1	1	0	1	0
2000–01	HC Ceske Budejovice	Czech	2	0	0	0	0	—	—	—	—	—
2000–01	HC ZVVZ Milevsko	Czech3	7	1	0	1	0	—	—	—	—	—
2000–01	KLH Jindrichuv Hradec	Czech3	2	0	0	0	4	—	—	—	—	—
2001–02	HC Ceske Budejovice	Czech	18	0	0	0	10	—	—	—	—	—
2000–01	IHC Písek	Czech2	26	3	2	5	20	—	—	—	—	—
2002–03	HC Ceske Budejovice	Czech	26	1	1	2	6	—	—	—	—	—
2003–04	HC Ceske Budejovice	Czech	31	0	2	2	18	—	—	—	—	—
2003–04	IHC Písek	Czech2	15	1	5	6	8	—	—	—	—	—
2004–05	HC Ceske Budejovice	Czech2	48	3	11	14	40	7	1	2	3	10
2004–05	Vsetinska Hokejova	Czech	1	0	0	0	0	—	—	—	—	—
2005–06	HC Ceske Budejovice	Czech	46	2	3	5	38	10	0	0	0	6
2006–07	SK Znojemští Orli	Czech	48	3	9	12	44	7	0	0	0	14
2007–08	SK Znojemští Orli	Czech	50	1	3	4	32	3	1	0	1	0
2008–09	SK Znojemští Orli	Czech	13	1	2	3	10	—	—	—	—	—
2008–09	HC Olomouc	Czech2	2	0	0	0	6	—	—	—	—	—
2008–09	HC Slovan Bratislava	Slovak	14	0	2	2	14	10	0	1	1	8
2009–10	HC Mountfield	Czech	19	1	0	1	20	2	0	0	0	0
2009–10	HC Tábor	Czech2	28	3	10	13	36	—	—	—	—	—
2010–11	HC Mountfield	Czech	23	1	5	6	4	5	0	0	0	2
2010–11	HC Tábor	Czech2	9	0	0	0	6	—	—	—	—	—
2011–12	KH Sanok	Poland	39	11	12	23	32	9	1	0	1	4
2012–13	KH Sanok	Poland	36	3	12	15	16	10	1	1	2	10
2013–14	JKH GKS Jastrzebie	Poland	13	1	1	2	4	—	—	—	—	—
2013–14	HC Motor České Budějovice	Czech2	23	0	2	2	12	—	—	—	—	—
2014–15	HC Rebel Havlíčkův Brod	Czech2	10	1	1	2	10	—	—	—	—	—
2014–15	KLH Jindrichuv Hradec	Czech3	7	0	4	4	4	—	—	—	—	—
2014–15	SHK 37 Piestany	Slovak	32	2	5	7	28	6	1	0	1	4
2015–16	SHK 37 Piestany	Slovak	34	1	5	6	14	—	—	—	—	—
2018–19	ESV Waldkirchen	Germany5	—	—	—	—	—	—	—	—	—	—
2019–20	ESV Waldkirchen	Germany5	30	11	20	31	28	—	—	—	—	—
2020–21	HC Samson Ceske Budejovice	Czech4	3	0	0	0	2	—	—	—	—	—
Czech totals			277	10	25	35	182	27	1	0	1	24
