= 1985–86 Polska Liga Hokejowa season =

Polish ice hockey season

The 1985–86 Polska Liga Hokejowa season was the 51st season of the Polska Liga Hokejowa, the top level of ice hockey in Poland. 10 teams participated in the league, and Polonia Bytom won the championship.

== Final round ==
	Club	GP	Goals	Pts
1.	Polonia Bytom	28	154:62	46
2.	Podhale Nowy Targ	28	143:74	42
3.	Zagłębie Sosnowiec	28	182:100	41
4.	Naprzód Janów	28	125:109	33
5.	Stoczniowiec Gdansk	28	107:160	20
6.	GKS Katowice	28	104:151	19

== Qualification round ==
	Club	GP	Goals	Pts
7.	ŁKS Łódź	30	136:137	29
8.	GKS Tychy	30	119:129	26
9.	KS Cracovia	30	124:151	22
10.	KTH Krynica	30	90:211	10

== Playoffs ==
=== Quarterfinals ===
- Polonia Bytom - GKS Tychy 2:0 (10:1, 6:1)
- Naprzód Janów - Stoczniowiec Gdansk 2:0 (8:2, 5:3)
- Podhale Nowy Targ - ŁKS Łódź 2:1 (6:4, 1:4, 5:0)
- Zagłębie Sosnowiec - GKS Katowice 2:0 (4:3, 5:2)

=== Semifinals ===
- Polonia Bytom - Naprzód Janów 2:0 (3:1, 6:2)
- Podhale Nowy Targ - Zagłębie Sosnowiec 2:1 (5:3, 2:3, 4:2)

=== Final ===
- Polonia Bytom - Podhale Nowy Targ 2:1 (1:0, 3:4, 4:2)

== Relegation ==
- KS Cracovia - KTH Krynica
