= Aleksi Varttinen =

Finnish ice hockey defenceman

- Born: 26 June 1997 (age 28) Eura, Finland
- Height: 5 ft 10 in (178 cm)
- Weight: 187 lb (85 kg; 13 st 5 lb)
- Position: Defence
- Shoots: Left
- PHL team Former teams: GKS Katowice; Ässät; Hokki; SaPKo; MHk 32 Liptovský Mikuláš
- Playing career: 2018–present

Aleksi Mikael Varttinen (born 26 June 1997) is a Finnish professional ice hockey defenceman who plays for GKS Katowice of the Polska Hokej Liga.

== Career ==
Varttinen began his career with Ässät, playing in their junior system between 2015 and 2018 before debuting for their senior team.

On August 25, 2021, Varttinen signed for MHk 32 Liptovský Mikuláš of Slovakia's Tipos extraliga.

== Career statistics ==
=== Regular season and playoffs ===
			Regular season					Playoffs
Season	Team	League	GP	G	A	Pts	PIM	GP	G	A	Pts	PIM
2021–22	MHk 32 Liptovský Mikuláš	Slovak	45	7	7	14	53	—	—	—	—	—
Liiga totals			109	6	5	11	90	—	—	—	—	—
