= Artem Iossafov =

Finnish ice hockey player

- Born: September 27, 1990 (age 34); Kalinin, USSR
- Height: 5 ft 11 in (180 cm)
- Weight: 187 lb (85 kg; 13 st 5 lb)
- Position: Forward
- Shoots: Right
- Erste Liga team Former teams: Dunaújvárosi Acélbikák; HIFK; KalPa; Espoo Blues; Gentofte Stars; Podhale Nowy Targ
- NHL draft: Undrafted
- Playing career: 2011–present

Artem Iossafov (born September 27, 1990) is a Russian-born Finnish ice hockey player.

== Playing career ==
Iossafov began his career in Finland and made his Liiga debut playing with HIFK during the 2013–14 Liiga season.

== Career statistics ==
| | | | Regular Season | | | | | Playoffs |
| Season | Team | League | GP | G | A | Pts | PIM | GP | G | A | Pts | PIM |
|---|---|---|---|---|---|---|---|---|---|---|---|---|
| 2008–09 | Jokerit U20 | Jr. A SM-liiga | 40 | 4 | 6 | 10 | 10 | 4 | 2 | 0 | 2 | 0 |
| 2009–10 | Jokerit U20 | Jr. A SM-liiga | 0 | 0 | 0 | 0 | 0 | 1 | 0 | 0 | 0 | 2 |
| 2010–11 | Jokerit U20 | Jr. A SM-liiga | 34 | 15 | 15 | 30 | 8 | 7 | 1 | 4 | 5 | 2 |
| 2011–12 | Kiekko-Vantaa | Mestis | 45 | 13 | 12 | 25 | 2 | 4 | 2 | 2 | 4 | 0 |
| 2012–13 | Kiekko-Vantaa | Mestis | 47 | 14 | 19 | 33 | 12 | 3 | 1 | 3 | 4 | 0 |
| 2013–14 | Kiekko-Vantaa | Mestis | 46 | 22 | 21 | 43 | 10 | 5 | 4 | 4 | 8 | 4 |
| 2013–14 | HIFK | Liiga | 4 | 0 | 0 | 0 | 0 | – | – | – | – | – |
| 2013–14 | KalPa | Liiga | 4 | 0 | 0 | 0 | 0 | – | – | – | – | – |
| 2014–15 | Kiekko-Vantaa | Mestis | 17 | 7 | 15 | 22 | 6 | – | – | – | – | – |
| 2014–15 | Blues | Liiga | 28 | 3 | 3 | 6 | 2 | 2 | 0 | 0 | 0 | 0 |
| 2015–16 | Gentofte Stars | Metal Ligaen | 44 | 9 | 13 | 22 | 20 | – | – | – | – | – |
| 2016–17 | Podhale Nowy Targ | Poland | 38 | 21 | 15 | 36 | 14 | 11 | 3 | 2 | 5 | 0 |
| 2017–18 | Asplöven HC | Hockeyettan | 30 | 7 | 20 | 27 | 14 | – | – | – | – | – |
| 2018–19 | Dunaújvárosi Acélbikák | Erste Liga | 49 | 19 | 25 | 44 | 8 | – | – | – | – | – |
| 2019–20 | JKH GKS Jastrzebie | Poland | 44 | 20 | 28 | 48 | 10 | 7 | 1 | 1 | 2 | 0 |
| Liiga totals | | | 36 | 3 | 3 | 6 | 2 | 2 | 0 | 0 | 0 | 0 |
| Mestis totals | | | 155 | 56 | 67 | 123 | 30 | 12 | 7 | 9 | 16 | 4 |
