= JKH GKS Jastrzębie =

Professional ice hockey team in Jastrzębie-Zdrój, Poland

- City: Jastrzębie-Zdrój, Poland
- League: Polska Hokej Liga
- Founded: 1963; 63 years ago
- Home arena: Jastor
- Colours: Green, yellow, black
- General manager: Leszek Laszkiewicz
- Website: jkh.pl

JKH GKS Jastrzębie is a professional ice hockey team based in Jastrzębie-Zdrój, Poland. The team competes in the Polska Hokej Liga, the highest league in Poland. They won their Polish Cup during the 2012–13 season, defeating the reigning champions Ciarko PBS Bank KH Sanok in the final.

== History ==
The JKH GKS Jastrzębie hockey club was established in 1963 in the southern Polish city of Jastrzębie, near the Czech border. For much of the 1970s and 80s, the team competed in Poland's second division, finally earning promotion to the top-flight league for the first time in 1991. However, after a single season, the club was forced to withdraw from the league ahead of the 1992–93 campaign due to severe financial and organizational issues, ultimately leading to its dissolution.

A new entity, Jastrzębski Klub Hockeyowy (JKH), was formed in 1995. After a brief stint in the second division, the club shifted its focus to youth development for a period. A decade later, the team returned to professional competition with the clear objective of once again reaching the Ekstraliga. This ambition was realized in 2007 when the team completed an undefeated season, securing their promotion to the top division.

Since their return, the club has claimed the Polish Cup title four times, with their most recent victory in 2020. They have also finished as the national league runner-up on two occasions, in 2013 and 2015. In the 2021–22 season, Jastrzębie won their first Polish Championship title, and earned them their inaugural berth in the Champions Hockey League.

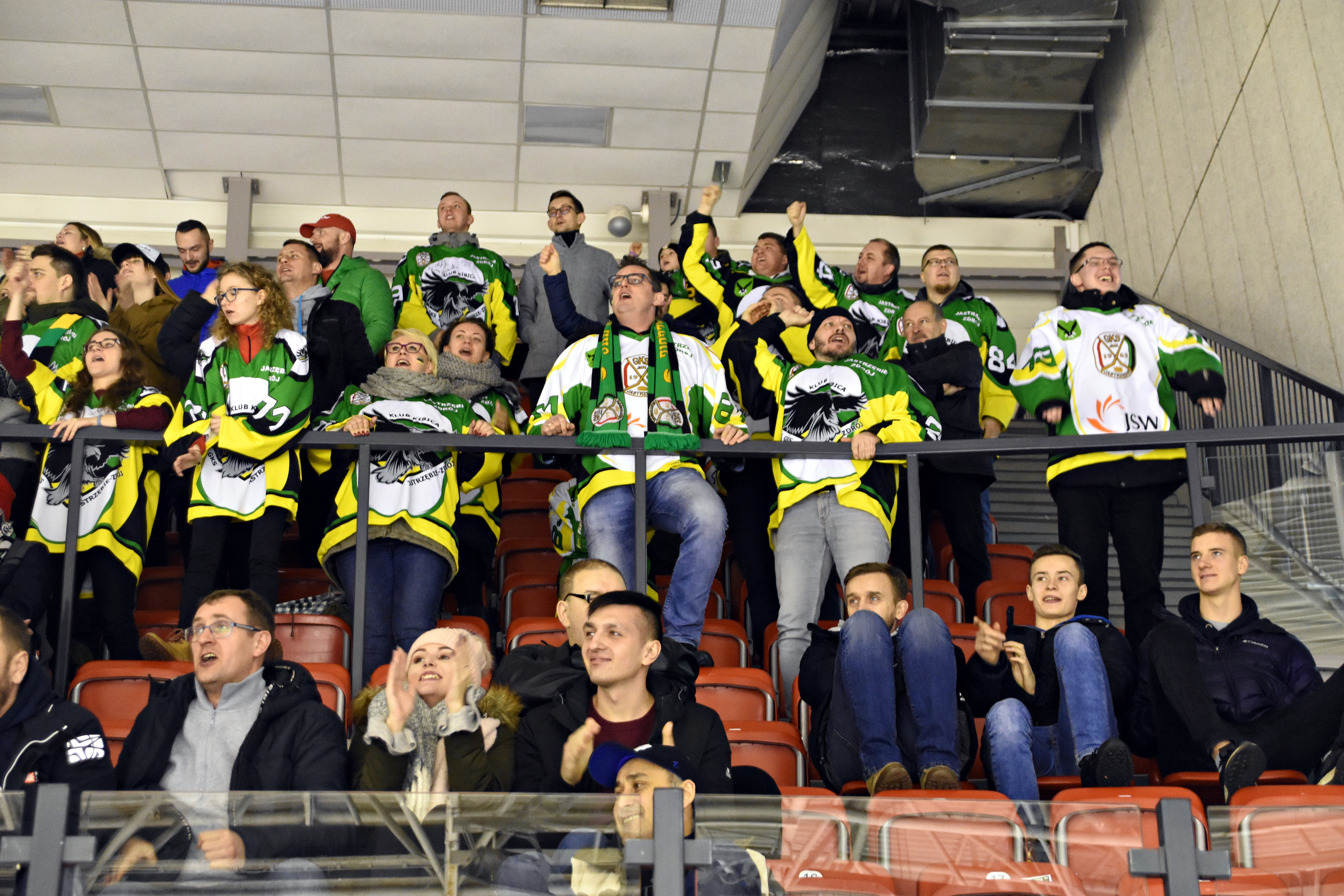
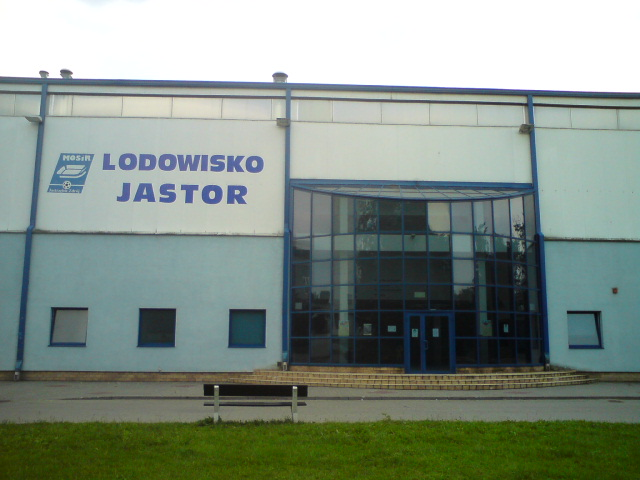
JKH GKS Jastrzębie's spectators and the team's home arena

Jastrzębie won the playoffs bronze medal in the 2013–14 season, and a silver medal in the 2014–15 season playoffs. Leszek Laszkiewicz scored his 1,000th career point in Polish hockey during the 2016–17 season–a total which included career regular season and playoffs scoring.

Laszkiewicz became general manager of Jastrzebie in the 2018–19 season. Jastrzebie won the Polish Cup versus Podhale Nowy Targ in his first season, and placed fourth of 11 teams. Repeating as Polish Cup champions versus TH Unia Oświęcim in the 2019–20 season, Jastrzebie placed fourth and won the first round of playoffs, when the national COVID-19 pandemic response canceled remaining playoff rounds. Jastrzebie placed second of 10 teams and won three championships in his third year as general manager. Jastrzebie won the PHL super cup versus GKS Tychy to begin the 2020–21 season, won the Polish Cup versus TH Unia Oświęcim, and won the PLH playoffs gold medal. Jastrzebie placed third in the 2021–22 season, and won the bronze medal in the playoffs. Following a fifth-place finish in the 2022–23 season, Jastrzebie placed fourth in the 2023–24 season and lost in the Polish Cup final versus GKS Tychy. In the 2024–25 season, Jastrzebie won the playoffs bronze medal and were again finalists in the Polish Cup final versus GKS Tychy.

== Notable players ==
- Robert Arrak
- Richard Bordowski
- Artyom Dubinin
- Peter Fabuš
- Patrik Flašar
- Jakub Grof
- Ján Homer
- Artem Iossafov
- Henrich Jaborník
- Māris Jass
- Milan Karlíček
- Markus Korkiakoski
- Ivo Kotaška
- Leszek Laszkiewicz
- Jan Látal
- Samuel Mlynarovič
- Patrik Nechvátal
- Roman Němeček
- Zack Phillips
- Petr Polodna
- Radek Procházka
- Tomáš Protivný
- Frenks Razgals
- Jesse Rohtla
- Robert Slipčenko
- Filip Stoklasa
- Jozef Švec
- Sławomir Wieloch
- Pavel Zdráhal
