= 1984–85 Polska Liga Hokejowa season =

Polish ice hockey season

The 1984–85 Polska Liga Hokejowa season was the 50th season of the Polska Liga Hokejowa, the top level of ice hockey in Poland. 10 teams participated in the league, and Zaglebie Sosnowiec won the championship.

== Final round ==
	Club	GP	W	T	L	Goals	Pts
1.	Zagłębie Sosnowiec	28	18	5	5	154:92	41
2.	Polonia Bytom	28	19	2	7	162:54	40
3.	Podhale Nowy Targ	28	19	2	7	142:70	40
4.	Naprzód Janów	28	11	4	13	105:110	26
5.	KS Cracovia	28	11	3	14	105:134	25
6.	GKS Tychy	28	9	5	14	90:116	23

== Qualification round ==
	Club	GP	W	T	L	Goals	Pts
7.	ŁKS Łódź	30	13	3	14	111:143	29
8.	Stoczniowiec Gdansk	30	10	6	14	102:133	26
9.	GKS Katowice	30	9	4	17	119:154	22
10.	Unia Oświęcim	30	7	2	21	99:183	16

== Playoffs ==
=== Quarterfinals ===
- Zagłębie Sosnowiec - Stoczniowiec Gdansk 2:0 (6:3, 5:3)
- Naprzód Janów - KS Cracovia 2:0 (3:0, 6:0)
- Polonia Bytom - ŁKS Łódź 2:0 (7:1, 3:2 n.P.)
- Podhale Nowy Targ - GKS Tychy 2:0 (8:1, 2:1)

=== Semifinals ===
- Zagłębie Sosnowiec - Naprzód Janów 2:0 (9:8, 6:5)
- Polonia Bytom - Podhale Nowy Targ 2:1 (4:2, 3:4, 3:2)

=== Final ===
- Zagłębie Sosnowiec - Polonia Bytom 2:0 (6:1, 5:3)

== Placing round ==
=== 7th place ===
- ŁKS Łódź - Stoczniowiec Gdansk 1:2 (4:2, 4:8, 7:9)

=== 5th place ===
- KS Cracovia - GKS Tychy 1:2 (7:4, 5:8, 4:7)

=== 3rd place ===
- Podhale Nowy Targ - Naprzód Janów 2:0 (5:2, 6:2)

== Relegation ==
- GKS Katowice - Unia Oświęcim 2:0 (6:0, 9:2)
