= Robert Slipčenko =

Czech ice hockey player

- Born: August 16, 1985 (age 39)
- Height: 6 ft 0 in (183 cm)
- Weight: 183 lb (83 kg; 13 st 1 lb)
- Position: Goaltender
- Caught: Right
- Played for: HC Slavia Praha; HC '05 Banská Bystrica; HK Poprad; JKH GKS Jastrzębie; HK Dukla Trenčín
- NHL draft: Undrafted
- Playing career: 2004–2015

Robert Slipčenko (born August 16, 1985) is a Czech former professional ice hockey goaltender.

Slipčenko played 44 games in the Czech Extraliga for HC Slavia Praha. He previously played for HC Slezan Opava, HC Havířov, HC Kadaň and HC Havlíčkův Brod. and HC Slavia Praha. He also played in the Tipsport Liga for HC '05 Banská Bystrica. HK Poprad and HK Dukla Trenčín and the Polska Hokej Liga for JKH GKS Jastrzębie.
