= 2015–16 Polska Hokej Liga season =

- League: Polska Hokej Liga
- Sport: Ice hockey
- Duration: Sept. 2015 - Apr. 2016
- Number of teams: 12

Regular season
- Regular-season winner: KS Cracovia
- Top scorer: Martin Przygodzki (TMH Polonia Bytom) (35)
- Relegated to 1. Liga: Nesta Mires Toruń

Playoffs

Finals
- Champions: KS Cracovia
- Runners-up: GKS Tychy

Polska Liga Hokejowa seasons
- ← 2014–15 2016–17 →

The 2015–16 Polska Hokej Liga season was the 81st season of the Polska Hokej Liga, the top level of ice hockey in Poland. Twelve teams participated in the league. GKS Katowice (ice hockey) did not return to the league, as they suspended operations due to financial constraints. Three teams joined the league from the Polish 1. Liga: Nesta Mires Toruń, KH Zagłębie Sosnowiec, and SMS I Sosnowiec (a youth team).

The regular season format remained the same as the previous season, but with 12 teams rather than only 10. The first round had teams playing 22 matches, after which KS Cracovia led the league with 54 points.

The league was then divided into two groups for the second round: group A, consisting of the top 6 teams, and group B, consisting of the bottom 6 teams. KS Cracovia stayed in first place, finishing the season with 101 points. Their success continued into the playoffs, which they ended up winning after beating GKS Tychy in the finals. Podhale Nowy Targ won the bronze-medal match.

KH Zagłębie Sosnowiec and Naprzód Janów were relegated to the Polish 1. Liga.

== Teams ==
Teams currently in the Polska Hokej Liga.
Location of teams in the Katowice urban area

Team	City	Arena	Capacity
ComArch Cracovia	Kraków	Lodowisko im. Adama "Rocha" Kowalskiego	2,514
GKS Tychy	Tychy	Stadion Zimowy w Tychach	2,535
JKH GKS Jastrzębie	Jastrzębie-Zdrój	Jastor	1,986
Naprzód Janów	Katowice	Jantor Janów	1,417
Orlik Opole	Opole	Toropol	3,000
Podhale Nowy Targ	Nowy Targ	Miejska Hala Lodowa w Nowym Targu	5,000
Polonia Bytom	Bytom	OSiR w Bytomiu	3,000
Ciarko PBS Bank STS Sanok	Sanok	Arena Sanok	3,000
SMS I Sosnowiec	Sosnowiec	Stadion Zimowy w Sosnowcu	3,500
Nesta Mires Toruń	Toruń	Tor-Tor	5,250
Unia Oświęcim	Oświęcim	Hala Lodowa MOSiR Oświęcim	5,000
Zagłębie Sosnowiec	Sosnowiec	Stadion Zimowy w Sosnowcu	3,500

== Regular season (first round) ==
After 22 matches, the top 6 teams advanced to the stronger group (group A) to determine standings before playoffs.
The bottom 6 teams advanced to the weaker group (group B) to determine the two teams that would also advance to the playoffs, and the team that would be relegated.

	Club	GP	W	L	OTW	OTL	GF:GA	Pts
1.	KS Cracovia	22	17	3	1	1	116:38	54
2.	Podhale Nowy Targ	22	16	3	2	1	116:43	53
3.	GKS Tychy	22	17	5	0	0	119:49	51
4.	GKS Jastrzębie	22	14	4	2	3	74:41	48
5.	Unia Oświęcim	22	11	8	2	1	79:66	38
6.	STS Sanok	22	11	8	1	2	69:50	37
7.	Orlik Opole	22	11	9	1	1	80:62	36
8.	Polonia Bytom	22	10	10	1	1	84:71	33
9.	Zagłębie Sosnowiec	22	6	15	0	1	49:94	19
10.	TKH Toruń	22	3	16	1	2	61:109	13
11.	Naprzód Janów	22	2	17	2	1	45:118	11
12.	SMS I Sosnowiec	22	1	21	0	0	26:177	3

== Regular season (second round, Group A) ==
The top 6 teams from the first round were put in this group to determine the standings before the playoffs. Results from the second round are added to results from the first round.

	Club	GP	W	L	OTW	OTL	GF:GA	Pts
1.	KS Cracovia	42	31	6	3	2	190:85	101
2.	GKS Tychy	42	29	9	2	2	183:89	93
3.	Podhale Nowy Targ	42	24	14	3	1	176:104	79
4.	GKS Jastrzębie	42	18	14	4	6	126:108	68
5.	STS Sanok	42	17	16	3	6	123:108	63
6.	Unia Oświęcim	42	16	21	4	1	129:147	57

== Regular season (second round, group B) ==
The bottom 6 teams from the first round were put in this group to determine the standings before the playoffs. Results from the second round are added to results from the first round.
The top two teams advanced to the Playoffs. The remaining teams, excluding SMS I Sosnowiec, were moved to the relegation round. SMS I Sosnowiec, an under-20 team, is not eligible to be relegated.

	Club	GP	W	L	OTW	OTL	GF:GA	Pts
7.	Polonia Bytom	42	25	14	2	1	194:124	80
8.	Orlik Opole	42	25	14	1	2	192:135	79
9.	Naprzód Janów	42	15	22	4	1	129:182	54
10.	Zagłębie Sosnowiec	42	12	27	1	2	126:876	40
11.	TKH Toruń	42	9	27	2	4	147:212	35
12.	SMS I Sosnowiec	42	1	38	1	2	69:304	7

== Relegation round ==
The top two teams remain in the PHL, while the last place team is relegated to the Polish 1. Liga.

	Club	GP	W	L	OTW	OTL	GF:GA	Pts
1.	Naprzód Janów	50	17	26	5	2	159:220	63
2.	Zagłębie Sosnowiec	50	15	30	2	3	156:217	52
3.	TKH Toruń	50	14	30	2	4	186:242	50

== Playoffs ==
Quarter-finals
1. KS Cracovia	3
8. Orlik Opole	0
4. GKS Jastrzębie	0
5. STS Sanok	3
3. Podhale Nowy Targ	3
6. Unia Oświęcim	1
2. GKS Tychy	3
7. Polonia Bytom	0

Semi-finals
1. KS Cracovia	4
5. STS Sanok	3
3. Podhale Nowy Targ	0
2. GKS Tychy	4

Final
1. KS Cracovia	4
2. GKS Tychy	3
Third place
3. Podhale Nowy Targ	2
5. STS Sanok	1
