= 1982–83 Polska Liga Hokejowa season =

Polish ice hockey season

The 1982–83 Polska Liga Hokejowa season was the 48th season of the Polska Liga Hokejowa, the top level of ice hockey in Poland. 10 teams participated in the league, and Zaglebie Sosnowiec won the championship.

== Regular season ==
	Club	GP	W	T	L	Goals	Pts
1.	Zagłębie Sosnowiec	36	31	1	4	291:103	63
2.	Polonia Bytom	36	20	6	10	172:97	46
3.	GKS Tychy	36	20	5	11	176:118	45
4.	Naprzód Janów	36	19	6	11	185:140	44
5.	Podhale Nowy Targ	36	17	6	13	167:113	40
6.	GKS Katowice	36	17	3	16	167:183	37
7.	ŁKS Łódź	36	12	5	19	101:166	29
8.	BKS Bydgoszcz	36	8	5	23	114:231	21
9.	KS Cracovia	36	9	1	26	164:290	19
10.	Stoczniowiec Gdansk	36	6	4	26	117:213	16
