= 2016–17 Polska Hokej Liga season =

- League: Polska Hokej Liga
- Sport: Ice hockey
- Duration: Sept. 2016 - Apr. 2017
- Number of teams: 11

Regular season
- Regular-season winner: GKS Tychy
- Top scorer: Michael Cichy (Orlik Opole) (32)
- Relegated to 1. Liga: Nesta Mires Toruń

Playoffs

Finals
- Champions: KS Cracovia
- Runners-up: GKS Tychy

Polska Liga Hokejowa seasons
- ← 2015–16 2017–18 →

The 2016–17 Polska Hokej Liga season was the 82nd season of the Polska Hokej Liga, the top level of ice hockey in Poland. Eleven teams participated in the league. Two teams returned to the league: GKS Katowice returned after a year of inactivity, and Stoczniowiec Gdańsk was promoted from the Polish 1. Liga. Due to financial constraints, KH Zagłębie Sosnowiec, Naprzód Janów, and STS Sanok did not return to the league. Sosnowiec and Janów dropped down to the Polish 1. Liga, while Sanok suspended operations altogether.

The regular season format remained the same as the previous season, but with 11 teams rather than 12. The First Round had teams playing 20 matches, after which GKS Tychy led the league with 50 points.

The league was then divided into two groups for the Second Round: Group A, consisting of the top 6 teams, and Group B, consisting of the bottom 5 teams. GKS Tychy remained at the top of Group A, finishing the regular season with 93 points. From the weaker group (Group B), Unia Oswiecim and GKS Katowice advanced to the playoffs.

KS Cracovia won the playoff championship, beating GKS Tychy. Polonia Bytom won the bronze medal game, rounding out the top three.

== Regular season (first round) ==
After 20 matches, the top 6 teams advanced to the stronger group (Group A) to determine standings before playoffs.
The bottom 5 teams advanced to the weaker group (Group B) to determine the two teams that would also advance to the playoffs, and the team that would be relegated.

	Club	GP	W	L	OTW	OTL	GF:GA	Pts
1.	GKS Tychy	20	15	2	2	1	104:35	50
2.	KS Cracovia	20	16	3	0	1	105:43	49
3.	Podhale Nowy Targ	20	13	5	1	1	85:49	42
4.	Polonia Bytom	20	10	6	3	1	55:51	37
5.	GKS Jastrzębie	20	9	6	2	3	67:50	34
6.	Orlik Opole	20	9	7	1	3	71:53	32
7.	Unia Oświęcim	20	8	7	3	2	60:56	32
8.	GKS Katowice	20	8	10	2	0	49:57	28
9.	TKH Toruń	20	4	14	1	1	56:96	15
10.	Stoczniowiec Gdansk	20	3	15	0	2	44:89	11
11.	SMS I Sosnowiec	20	0	20	0	0	31:148	0

== Regular season (second round, Group A) ==
The top 6 teams from the First Round were put in this group to determine the standings before the playoffs. Results from the Second Round are added to results from the First Round.

	Club	GP	W	L	OTW	OTL	GF:GA	Pts
1.	GKS Tychy	40	28	6	3	3	173:79	93
2.	KS Cracovia	40	28	8	1	3	179:99	89
3.	Podhale Nowy Targ	40	20	14	4	2	149:120	70
4.	Polonia Bytom	40	16	15	7	2	106:101	64
5.	Orlik Opole	40	16	15	2	7	122:110	59
6.	GKS Jastrzębie	40	12	19	4	5	113:127	49

== Regular season (second round, Group B) ==
The bottom 6 teams from the First Round were put in this group to determine the standings before the playoffs. Results from the Second Round are added to results from the First Round.
The top two teams advanced to the Playoffs. The remaining teams, excluding SMS I Sosnowiec, were moved to the relegation round. SMS I Sosnowiec, an under-20 team, is not eligible to be relegated.

	Club	GP	W	L	OTW	OTL	GF:GA	Pts
7.	Unia Oświęcim	36	20	10	4	2	142:94	70
8.	GKS Katowice	36	17	13	2	4	108:98	59
9.	TKH Toruń	36	10	19	6	1	146:155	43
10.	Stoczniowiec Gdansk	36	10	23	0	3	116:139	33
11.	SMS I Sosnowiec	36	0	35	0	1	52:284	1

== Relegation Round ==
The bottom two teams from Group B (excluding SMS I Sosnowiec, who can not be relegated), face each other to determine who stays in the league and who will be relegated. Stoczniowiec Gdansk won the best-of-four series 4–2, against TKH Toruń. As a result, Torun was relegated.

== Playoffs ==
Quarter-finals
1. GKS Tychy	4
8. GKS Katowice	0
4. Polonia Bytom	4
5. Orlik Opole	1
2. KS Cracovia	4
7. Unia Oświęcim	1
3. Podhale Nowy Targ	4
6. GKS Jastrzębie	1

Semi-finals
1. GKS Tychy	4
5. Polonia Bytom	0
2. KS Cracovia	4
3. Podhale Nowy Targ	0

Final
2. KS Cracovia	4
1. GKS Tychy	3
Third place
4. Polonia Bytom	2
3. Podhale Nowy Targ	0
