= Látal =

Látal (feminine Látalová) is a Czech surname. Notable people with the surname include:

- Jan Látal (born 1990), Czech ice hockey player
- Jiří Látal (born 1967), Czech ice hockey player
- Martin Látal (born 1988), Czech ice hockey player
- Ondřej Látal (born 1981), Czech ice hockey player
- Radoslav Látal (born 1970), Czech football player and manager
- Stanislav Látal (1919–1994), Czech animator and puppet-film maker
