= Patrik Nechvátal =

Czech ice hockey player

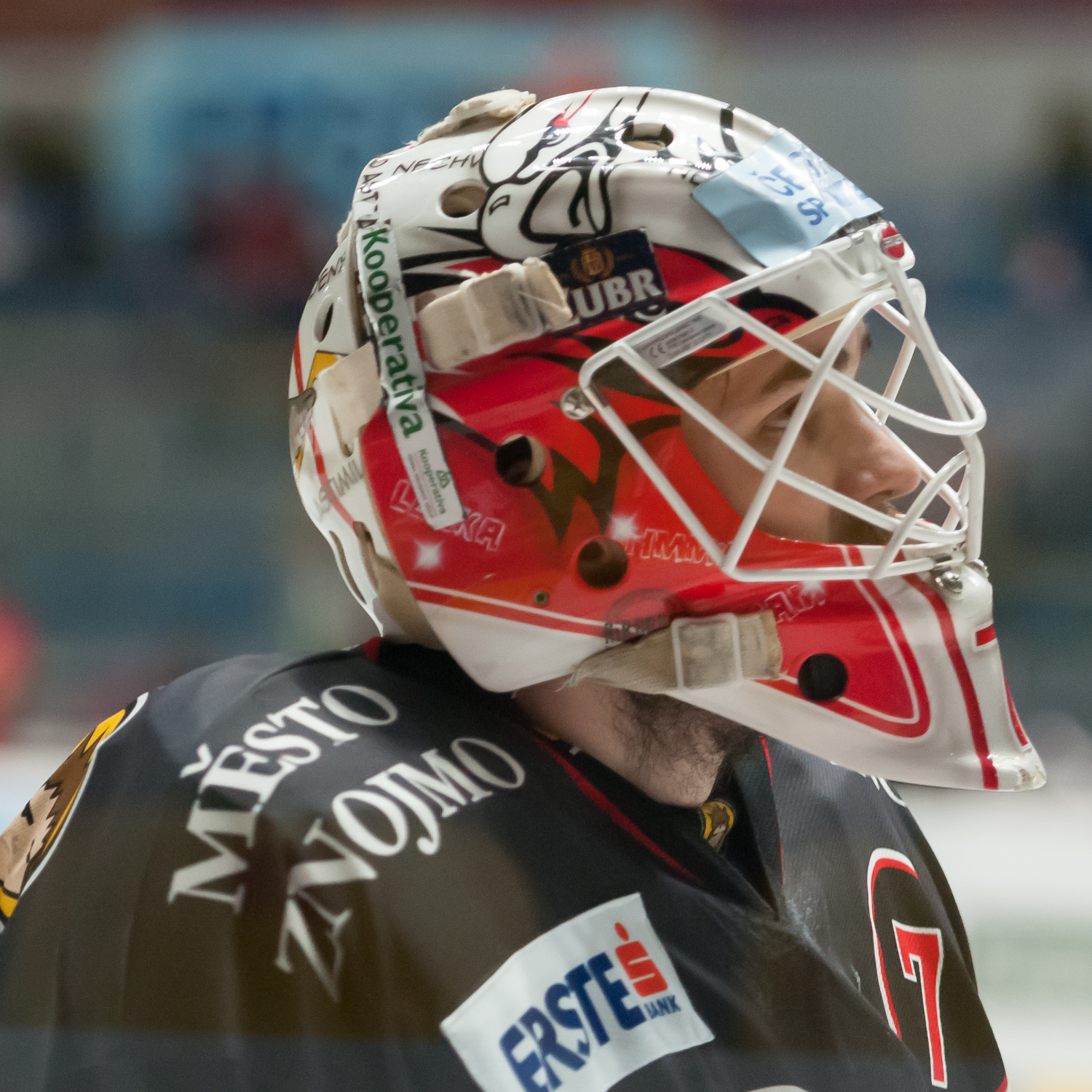
- Born: 8 July 1992 (age 33) Brno, Czechoslovakia
- Height: 191 cm (6 ft 3 in)
- Weight: 83 kg (183 lb; 13 st 1 lb)
- Position: Goaltender
- Catches: Left
- PHL team Former teams: JKH GKS Jastrzębie; HC Litvínov; Orli Znojmo; HC Innsbruck; HK Poprad; Nice hockey Côte d'Azur; HC Nové Zámky
- National team: Czech Republic
- NHL draft: Undrafted
- Playing career: 2011–present

Patrik Nechvátal (born July 8, 1992, in Brno) is a Czech professional ice hockey goaltender for JKH GKS Jastrzębie of the Polska Hokej Liga.

Nechvátal previously played for HC Litvínov, Orli Znojmo, HC Innsbruck, and Nice hockey Côte d'Azur.

== Career statistics ==
=== Regular season and playoffs ===
			Regular season										Playoffs
Season	Team	League	GP	W	L	T	OTL	MIN	GA	SO	GAA	SV%	GP	W	L	MIN	GA	SO	GAA	SV%
2009–10	HC Litvínov	Czech-Jr.	26								2.40	.899	8						2.69	.909
2010–11	HC Litvínov	Czech-Jr.	49								2.82	.895	2						2.98	.842
2011–12	HC Litvínov	Czech-Jr.	26								2.38	.908	3						2.26	.917
