= Polish Cup (disambiguation) =

The Polish Cup is a men's football competition in Poland.

Polish Cup may also refer to:

- Polish Basketball Cup
- Polish Cup (ice hockey)
- Polish Cup (women's football)
