= Adam Schusser =

Czech-German ice hockey player

- Born: April 18, 1991 (age 35) Karlovy Vary, Czechoslovakia
- Height: 6 ft 3 in (191 cm)
- Weight: 207 lb (94 kg; 14 st 11 lb)
- Position: Defence
- Shoots: Right
- Oberliga team Former teams: 1. EV Weiden; HC Karlovy Vary
- Playing career: 2012–present

Adam Schusser (born April 18, 1991) is a Czech-German professional ice hockey defenceman who currently plays for 1. EV Weiden of the Oberliga.

Schusser previously played 26 games in the Czech Extraliga for HC Karlovy Vary. He also had loan spells with HC Most in the 1st Czech National Hockey League and HC Baník Sokolov in the Czech 2. liga before moving to Germany in 2015 with EHC Freiburg of DEL2.

Schusser joined EHV Schönheide 09 of the Oberliga on July 15, 2016. He then joined fellow Oberliga side 1. EV Weiden on June 2, 2017, following Schönheide's relegation to the Regionalliga.
