= Stoklasa =

Stoklasa is a surname. Notable people with the surname include:

- Filip Stoklasa (born 1990), Czech ice hockey player
- Lutz Stoklasa (born 1949), German swimmer
- Mike Stoklasa (born 1978), American filmmaker and critic, founder of RedLetterMedia

== See also ==
- Stoklosa Alumni Field, a baseball field in Lowell, Massachusetts, United States
- Stocklasa, a surname
- Stokłosa, a surname
