= Sławomir Wieloch =

Polish ice hockey player

- Born: January 17, 1969 (age 56); Czeladź, Poland
- Height: 5 ft 9 in (175 cm)
- Weight: 192 lb (87 kg; 13 st 10 lb)
- Position: Left wing
- Played for: GKS Jastrzębie; Zagłębie Sosnowiec; Unia Oświęcim; Orlik Opole; Cracovia
- National team: Poland
- Playing career: 1987–2007

Sławomir Wieloch (born 17 January 1969) is a Polish former ice hockey player. He played for GKS Jastrzębie, Zagłębie Sosnowiec, Unia Oświęcim, Orlik Opole, and Cracovia during his career. He also played for the Polish national team at the 1992 Winter Olympics and multiple World Championships.
