= Charousek =

Charousek (feminine: Charousková) is a Czech surname. It is derived from the Lach adjective charý, meaning 'shabby', 'ugly'. Notable people with the surname include:

- Jiří Charousek (born 1981), Czech ice hockey player
- Rudolf Charousek (1873–1900), Czech-Hungarian chess player
