= Ján Homer =

Slovak ice hockey player

- Born: 11 December 1980 (age 44); Dubnica nad Váhom, Czechoslovakia
- Height: 6 ft 1 in (185 cm)
- Weight: 214 lb (97 kg; 15 st 4 lb)
- Position: Defenceman
- Shoots: Left
- PHL team Former teams: JKH GKS Jastrzębie; HK Dukla Trenčín (Svk-1); ŠHK 37 Piešťany (Svk-2); HK 36 Skalica (Svk-1); HK Prostějov (Cze-2); SK Horácká Slavia Třebíč (Cze-2); HC Zlín (Cze-1); HK Dubnica (Svk-2); HC Košice (Svk-1)
- NHL draft: Undrafted
- Playing career: 1997–present

Ján Homer (born 11 December 1980) is a Slovak ice hockey defenceman playing for JKH GKS Jastrzębie of the Polska Hokej Liga.

== Early life ==
Homer was born in Dubnica nad Váhom. He began playing junior ice hockey for his hometown club, HK Dubnica.

== Career ==
Homer signed with the Czech Extraliga team HC Zlín in 2009. He played 89 games in the Czech Extraliga, earning 11 points. He returned to the Slovak Extraliga in 2003, signing a contract with the HK Dukla Trenčín. In the 2003–04 season, he won the Slovak championship for Dukla. He won the Slovak title again in the 2009–10 and 2010–11 season for HC Košice.
