= Karliczek =

Karliczek is a Polish language surname, literally meaning a diminutive of the given name Karl or Karel. Notable people with the surname include:

- Anja Karliczek (Anja Kerssen, born 1971), German politician
- Joachim Karliczek (1914–1993), Polish swimmer

== See also ==
- Milan Karlíček
- Moritz Karlitzek
