= Artyom Dubinin =

Russian ice hockey player (born 1989)

- Born: March 30, 1989 (age 37) Togliatti, RSFSR, USSR
- Height: 6 ft 5 in (196 cm)
- Weight: 207 lb (94 kg; 14 st 11 lb)
- Position: Forward
- Shoots: Left
- VHL team Former teams: THK Tver; Amur Khabarovsk
- NHL draft: Undrafted
- Playing career: 2008–present

Artyom Alekseevich Dubinin (Russian: Артём Алексеевич Дубинин; born March 30, 1989) is a Russian professional ice hockey player. He is currently playing with THK Tver of the VHL.

Dubinin made his Kontinental Hockey League debut playing with Tolyatti Lada during the 2008–09 season.

== Career statistics ==
			Regular season					Playoffs
Season	Team	League	GP	G	A	Pts	PIM	GP	G	A	Pts	PIM
2004–05	HC Lada Togliatti-2	Russia3	12	2	1	3	4	—	—	—	—	—
2005–06	HC Lada Togliatti-2	Russia3	17	1	0	1	10	—	—	—	—	—
2006–07	HC Lada Togliatti-2	Russia3	64	7	13	20	54	—	—	—	—	—
2007–08	HC Lada Togliatti-2	Russia3	75	17	32	49	113	8	2	3	5	12
2008–09	HC Lada Togliatti	KHL	13	0	1	1	4	—	—	—	—	—
2008–09	HC Lada Togliatti-2	Russia3	40	9	13	22	56	3	0	1	1	4
2009–10	HC Ryazan	Russia2	1	0	0	0	0	—	—	—	—	—
2009–10	HC Ryazan-2	Russia3	8	2	8	10	27	—	—	—	—	—
2009–10	CSK VVS Samara	Russia2	9	0	0	0	12	—	—	—	—	—
2009–10	CSK VVS Samara-2	Russia3	3	0	0	0	0	—	—	—	—	—
2009–10	HC Lada Togliatti	MHL	14	6	5	11	40	—	—	—	—	—
2010–11	HC Lada Togliatti	VHL	55	12	13	25	54	—	—	—	—	—
2010–11	HC Lada Togliatti	MHL	5	1	1	2	6	—	—	—	—	—
2011–12	HC Lada Togliatti	VHL	42	9	5	14	32	4	0	2	2	2
2012–13	HC Lada Togliatti	VHL	49	10	17	27	20	10	5	2	7	8
2013–14	Amur Khabarovsk	KHL	30	1	4	5	12	—	—	—	—	—
2014–15	Sokol Krasnoyarsk	VHL	38	4	4	8	24	—	—	—	—	—
2015–16	HC Ryazan	VHL	25	1	5	6	20	—	—	—	—	—
2015–16	Ariada Volzhsk	VHL	12	1	2	3	16	—	—	—	—	—
2016–17	HC Sarov	VHL	48	4	13	17	36	—	—	—	—	—
2017–18	HC Nové Zámky	Slovak	21	3	2	5	14	—	—	—	—	—
2017–18	Yermak Angarsk	VHL	25	3	2	5	31	7	0	1	1	63
2018–19	JKH GKS Jastrzębie	Poland	35	7	15	22	56	2	0	0	0	4
2019–20	HC Aktobe	Kazakhstan	17	2	2	4	47	—	—	—	—	—
2019–20	Metallurg Zhlobin	Belarus	35	5	7	12	36	4	0	2	2	2
2019–20	HC Kremenchuk	Ukraine	—	—	—	—	—	11	6	7	13	18
2020–21	HC Kremenchuk	Ukraine	40	8	27	35	52	6	2	6	8	37
2021–22	HC Kremenchuk	Ukraine	15	4	9	13	22	—	—	—	—	—
2021–22	HC Kremenchuk	Ukraine	12	2	10	12	26	—	—	—	—	—
2022–23	Lokomotiv Orsha	Belarus	9	2	1	3	8	—	—	—	—	—
2022–23	Sobol Beryoza	Belarus Vysshaya	4	1	2	3	4	—	—	—	—	—
KHL totals			43	1	5	6	16	—	—	—	—	—
VHL totals			294	44	61	105	233	21	5	5	10	73
