= Henrich Jaborník =

Slovak ice hockey player

- Born: 18 February 1991 (age 34); Skalica, Czechoslovakia
- Height: 6 ft 3 in (191 cm)
- Weight: 194 lb (88 kg; 13 st 12 lb)
- Position: Defence
- Shoots: Right
- team Former teams: Free agent HK 36 Skalica; Dunaújvárosi Acélbikák; HC '05 Banská Bystrica; ŠHK 37 Piešťany; HK Poprad; Ferencvárosi TC; JKH GKS Jastrzębie; HK Dukla Trenčín
- Playing career: 2010–present

Henrich Jaborník (born 18 February 1991) is a Slovak professional ice hockey defenceman. He is currently a free agent having last played for HK Dukla Trenčín in the Slovak Extraliga.

Jaborník previously played for HK 36 Skalica, HC '05 Banská Bystrica, ŠHK 37 Piešťany and HK Poprad and up to 2016, he played a total of 279 games in the Slovak top tier. During the 2013–14 season, he played in the MOL Liga for Dunaújvárosi Acélbikák before returning to Slovakia.

On 6 June 2016 Jaborník went back to Hungary and signed for Ferencvárosi TC. After two seasons, he returned to Dunaújvárosi Acélbikák on 11 July 2018. On 29 May 2019 he moved to JKH GKS Jastrzębie of the Polska Hokej Liga before returning to Slovakia on 4 August 2020, signing for HK Dukla Trenčín.

== Career statistics ==
=== Regular season and playoffs ===
			Regular season					Playoffs
Season	Team	League	GP	G	A	Pts	PIM	GP	G	A	Pts	PIM

=== International ===
Year	Team	Event	Result	GP	G	A	Pts	PIM
2009	Slovakia	WJC18	7th	6	0	0	0	8
2010	Slovakia	WJC	8th	6	0	0	0	10
2011	Slovakia	WJC	8th	6	0	1	1	4
Junior totals				18	0	1	1	22
