= Milan Karlíček =

Czech ice hockey player

- Born: August 6, 1981 (age 44) Zlín, Czechoslovakia
- Height: 5 ft 10 in (178 cm)
- Weight: 185 lb (84 kg; 13 st 3 lb)
- Position: Defence
- Shot: Left
- Played for: HC Barum Continental Zlín; GKS Katowice; HC Oceláři Třinec; JKH GKS Jastrzębie; HK 36 Skalica
- Playing career: 2000–2013

Milan Karlíček (born February 6, 1981) is a Czech former professional ice hockey defenceman.

Karlíček played nine games in the Czech Extraliga, two for HC Barum Continental Zlín during the 1999–2000 season and seven for HC Oceláři Třinec during the 2003–04 season. He also played in the Polska Liga Hokejowa for GKS Katowice and JKH GKS Jastrzębie and in the Tipsport Liga in Slovakia for HK 36 Skalica.
