= Jiří Charousek =

Czech ice hockey player

Jiri Charousek
- Born: December 2, 1981 (age 43); Czechoslovakia
- Height: 6 ft 0 in (183 cm)
- Weight: 172 lb (78 kg; 12 st 4 lb)
- Position: Forward
- Shoots: Right
- Czech Extraliga team: Piráti Chomutov
- NHL draft: Undrafted
- Playing career: 2001–present

Jiri Charousek (born December 2, 1981) is a professional ice hockey player.

He learned the ice hockey game in Chomutov and began his career as a player in the local U20 team of Pirati Chomutov. Later he played for HC Most and as a loaner four games for the HC Litvinov in the Czech Extraliga. In 2008 he moved to SK Kadan, where he played until 2015. During this time he also played as a loaner three games for Pirati Chomutov in the first Czech league. In 2015 he went to HC Klasterec nad Ohri, after 2017 to Naprzod Janow in the first Polish ice hockey league. In 2018 he moved to Germany and played for the EC Lauterbach 2012 in the fourth league West.

At the beginning of 2019 he was hired by the Chemnitz Crashers from Chemnitz as a forward and as a coach for the young.
