= Stocklasa =

Stocklasa is a surname. Notable people with the surname include:

- Martin Stocklasa (born 1979), Liechtenstein footballer
- Michael Stocklasa (born 1980), Liechtenstein footballer

== See also ==
- Stoklasa
