= Stokłosa =

Stokłosa or Stoklosa is a Polish surname meaning brome grass. Notable people with the name include:

- Aleksandra Stokłosa (born 1999), Polish handball player
- Henryk Stokłosa (born 1949), Polish businessman and political activist
- Janusz Stokłosa (born 1954), Polish pianist and composer

== See also ==
- Stoklosa Alumni Field, a baseball field in Lowell, Massachusetts, United States
- Stoklasa, a surname
