= 2002–03 Czech 1. Liga season =

Czech ice hockey season

The 2002–03 Czech 1.liga season was the tenth season of the Czech 1.liga, the second level of ice hockey in the Czech Republic. 14 teams participated in the league, and HC Kladno won the championship.

== Regular season ==
	Club	GP	W	OTW	T	OTL	L	Goals	Pts
1.	HC Kladno	40	25	7	0	1	7	163:91	90
2.	HC Dukla Jihlava	40	23	2	1	2	12	125:97	76
3.	KLH Chomutov	40	19	5	1	3	12	130:104	71
4.	BK Mladá Boleslav	40	18	3	5	5	9	123:92	70
5.	HC Prostějov	40	19	2	6	2	11	136:113	69
6.	HC Slovan Ústí nad Labem	40	18	1	2	3	16	106:104	61
7.	IHC Písek	40	17	3	2	2	16	105:96	61
8.	SK Horácká Slavia Třebíč	40	16	3	2	3	16	108:110	59
9.	HC Slezan Opava	40	16	2	2	4	16	106:110	58
10.	HC Senators Žďár nad Sázavou	40	16	1	3	0	20	100:124	53
11.	SK Kadaň	40	13	2	3	1	21	88:110	47
12.	HC Berounští Medvědi	40	9	4	3	3	21	86:127	41
13.	HC Hradec Králové	40	9	2	2	2	25	99:139	35
14.	HC Hvězda Brno	40	7	0	4	6	23	103:161	31

== Playoffs ==
=== Quarterfinals ===
- HC Rabat Kladno – SK Horácká Slavia Třebíč 3:0 (5:1, 5:1, 3:2 P)
- HC Dukla Jihlava – IHC Písek 3:2 (4:1, 2:3 SN, 4:6, 5:2, 1:0)
- KLH Chomutov – HC Slovan Ústí nad Labem 3:2 (5:8, 4:0, 2:1 P, 2:6, 6:2)
- BK Mladá Boleslav – HC Prostějov 2:3 (6:3, 3:2 SN, 1:5, 0:1, 2:7)

=== Semifinals ===
- HC Rabat Kladno – HC Prostějov 3:0 (2:0, 5:4 P, 5:1)
- HC Dukla Jihlava – KLH Chomutov 3:0 (5:2, 4:1, 3:2)

=== Final ===
- HC Rabat Kladno – HC Dukla Jihlava 3:1 (4:2, 4:3 SN, 1:4, 5:1)

== Qualification ==
	Club	GP	W	OTW	T	OTL	L	GF	GA	Pts
1.	SK Kadaň	46	15	2	3	3	23	107	129	55
2.	HC Hradec Králové	46	14	3	2	2	25	127	151	52
3.	HC Berounští Medvědi	46	12	5	3	3	23	104	144	52
4.	HC Hvězda Brno	46	7	0	4	6	29	115	190	31

== Relegation ==
	Club	GP	W	OTW	T	OTL	L	GF	GA	Pts
1.	HC Berounští Medvědi	8	5	1	1	0	1	38	12	18
2.	HC Olomouc	8	5	0	0	0	3	26	21	15
3.	HC Benátky nad Jizerou	8	4	0	2	0	2	26	26	14
4.	HC Baník Most	8	2	0	1	1	4	21	28	8
5.	HC Hvězda Brno	8	1	0	0	0	7	18	42	3
