= 2004–05 Polska Liga Hokejowa season =

Polish ice hockey season

The 2004–05 Polska Liga Hokejowa season was the 70th season of the Polska Liga Hokejowa, the top level of ice hockey in Poland. Eight teams participated in the league, and GKS Tychy won the championship.

== Regular season ==
	Club	GP	W	OTW	T	OTL	L	Goals	Pts
1.	Unia Oświęcim	35	23	1	6	0	5	158:68	77
2.	GKS Tychy	35	20	0	7	0	8	154:87	67
3.	THK Torun	35	19	2	6	0	8	140:70	66
4.	Podhale Nowy Targ	35	19	0	5	1	11	135:95	63
5.	KS Cracovia	35	19	1	2	1	12	126:100	62
6.	Stoczniowiec Gdansk	35	16	0	3	2	14	137:110	51
7.	KH Sanok	35	3	0	1	0	31	66:238	10
8.	GKS Katowice	35	2	0	2	0	31	54:202	8

== Playoffs ==
Quarter-finals
Unia Oświęcim	3
GKS Katowice	0
Podhale Nowy Targ	0
KS Cracovia	3
GKS Tychy	3
KH Sanok	1
THK Torun	3
Stocznowiec Gdansk	1

Semi-finals
Unia Oświęcim	3
KS Cracovia	0
GKS Tychy	3
THK Torun	1

Final
Unia Oświęcim	0
GKS Tychy	4
Third place
THK Torun	0
KS Cracovia	3
