= Ondřej Látal =

Czech ice hockey player

- Born: March 15, 1981 (age 45) Ústí nad Labem, Czechoslovakia
- Height: 6 ft 2 in (188 cm)
- Weight: 192 lb (87 kg; 13 st 10 lb)
- Position: Forward
- Shoots: Left
- Czech Extraliga team: HC Sparta Praha
- Playing career: 2001–present

Ondřej Látal (born March 15, 1981, in Ústí nad Labem) is a Czech professional ice hockey forward. He played with HC Sparta Praha in the Czech Extraliga during the 2010–11 Czech Extraliga postseason.
