= Petr Polodna =

Czech ice hockey player

- Born: March 20, 1982 (age 43); Písek, Czechoslovakia
- Height: 5 ft 9 in (175 cm)
- Weight: 158 lb (72 kg; 11 st 4 lb)
- Position: Forward
- Shoots: Left
- Czech Extraliga team: HC Kometa Brno
- NHL draft: Undrafted
- Playing career: 2002–present

Petr Polodna (born March 30, 1982) is a Czech professional ice hockey forward playing with HC Kometa Brno in the Czech Extraliga.
