= 2001–02 Czech 1. Liga season =

The 2001–02 Czech 1.liga season was the ninth season of the Czech 1.liga, the second level of ice hockey in the Czech Republic. 14 teams participated in the league, and HC Bili Tygri Liberec won the championship.

== Regular season ==
	Club	GP	W	OTW	T	OTL	L	Goals	Pts
1.	HC Liberec	40	27	3	5	1	4	167:80	93
2.	SK Horácká Slavia Třebíč	40	23	1	4	4	8	139:82	79
3.	HC Dukla Jihlava	40	23	1	1	1	14	122:95	73
4.	KLH Chomutov	40	20	3	3	3	12	131:102	71
5.	HC Prostějov	40	22	0	2	2	14	131:98	70
6.	HC Slovan Ústí nad Labem	40	18	1	3	1	17	110:100	60
7.	HC Slezan Opava	40	14	5	5	2	14	131:128	58
8.	SK Kadaň	40	16	1	5	2	16	95:92	57
9.	HC Berounští Medvědi	40	16	1	2	2	19	118:130	54
10.	HC Rosice	40	15	1	5	1	18	124:118	53
11.	HC Ytong Brno	40	15	1	3	1	20	121:138	51
12.	IHC Písek	40	11	3	3	1	22	97:141	43
13.	HC Šumperk	40	10	3	3	3	21	100:146	42
14.	HC Kometa Brno	40	1	1	4	2	32	72:208	11

== Playoffs ==
=== Quarterfinals ===
- HC Bílí Tygři Liberec – SK Kadaň 4:1 (6:3, 4:3, 2:6, 3:1:, 3:0)
- SK Horácká Slavia Třebíč – HC Slezan Opava 4:1 (3:1, 6:1, 1:3, 3:2, 4:3)
- HC Dukla Jihlava – HC Slovan Ústí nad Labem 4:2 (4:1, 2:4, 2:3, 3:1, 2:1 P, 3:2)
- KLH Chomutov – HC Prostějov 4:2 (1:4, 4:5 SN, 2:0, 2:1 P, 6:3, 2:1)

=== Semifinals ===
- HC Bílí Tygři Liberec – KLH Chomutov 3:0 (8:1, 8:1, 4:2)
- SK Horácká Slavia Třebíč – HC Dukla Jihlava 0:3 (3:4, 1:3, 2:5)

=== Final ===
- HC Bílí Tygři Liberec – HC Dukla Jihlava 3:1 (2:1, 2:3 P, 2:1, 3:2)

== Qualification ==
	Club	GP	W	OTW	T	OTL	L	GF	GA	Pts
1.	HC Ytong Brno	46	18	1	3	2	22	148	164	61
2.	HC Šumperk	46	14	4	3	3	22	127	156	56
3.	IHC Písek	46	15	3	3	1	24	122	157	55
4.	HC Kometa Brno	46	1	1	4	2	38	84	247	11

== Relegation ==
	Club	GP	W	OTW	T	OTL	L	GF	GA	Pts
1.	BK Mladá Boleslav	8	6	0	2	0	0	36	12	20
2.	IHC Písek	8	6	0	1	0	1	36	15	19
3.	HC Orlová	7	2	0	1	1	3	27	33	8
4.	HC Kometa Brno	7	1	1	0	0	5	18	34	5
5.	HC Baník Most	8	1	0	0	0	7	21	44	3
