= 2014–15 Polska Hokej Liga season =

- League: Polska Hokej Liga
- Sport: Ice hockey
- Duration: Sept. 2014 - Apr. 2015
- Number of teams: 10
- TV partner(s): TVP Sport

Regular season
- Regular-season winner: JKH GKS Jastrzębie
- Top scorer: Jordan Pietrus (Ciarko PBS Bank KH Sanok); Damian Kapica (Podhale Nowy Targ) (28)
- Relegated to 1. Liga: GKS Katowice

Playoffs

Finals
- Champions: GKS Tychy
- Runners-up: JKH GKS Jastrzębie

Polska Liga Hokejowa seasons
- ← 2013–14 2015–16 →

The 2014–15 Polska Hokej Liga season was the 80th season of the Polska Hokej Liga, the top level of ice hockey in Poland.

== Teams ==
Ten teams participated in the league: Orlik Opole and Naprzód Janów moved up from the 1. Liga while KTH Krynica did not play in the PHL as they did not obtain a license, which allowed Podhale Nowy Targ to stay in the PHL.

Teams currently in the Polska Hokej Liga.
Location of teams in the Katowice urban area

Team	City	Arena	Capacity
ComArch Cracovia	Kraków	Lodowisko im. Adama "Rocha" Kowalskiego	2,514
GKS Katowice	Katowice	Lodowisko Spodek Satelita	1,500
GKS Tychy	Tychy	Stadion Zimowy w Tychach	2,535
JKH GKS Jastrzębie	Jastrzębie-Zdrój	Jastor	1,986
Naprzód Janów	Katowice	Jantor Janów	1,417
Orlik Opole	Opole	Toropol	3,000
Podhale Nowy Targ	Nowy Targ	Miejska Hala Lodowa w Nowym Targu	5,000
Polonia Bytom	Bytom	OSiR w Bytomiu	3,000
Ciarko PBS Bank STS Sanok	Sanok	Arena Sanok	3,000
Unia Oświęcim	Oświęcim	Hala Lodowa MOSiR Oświęcim	5,000

== Format ==
The regular season format was changed from the previous season. After 36 matches, GKS Tychy led the league with 82 points. Then the league has been divided into two groups for the Second Round: Group A, consisting of the top 6 teams competing against each other; and Group B, consisting of the bottom 4 teams competing.

== Results ==
In the stronger group (Group A), JKH GKS Jastrzębie finished in first place at the end of the season, and from the weaker group (Group B), Orlik Opole and Naprzód Janów advanced to the playoff round. GKS Tychy won the playoff championship, the second championship in the club's history. GKS Katowice was relegated to the 1. Liga at the end of the season.

=== Regular season (first round) ===
After 36 matches, the top 6 teams advanced to the stronger group (Group A) to determine standings before playoffs.
The bottom 4 teams advanced to the weaker group (Group B) to determine the two teams that would also advance to the playoffs, and the team that would be relegated.

	Club	GP	W	OTW	SOW	SOL	OTL	L	Goals	Pts
1.	GKS Tychy	36	26	0	1	1	1	7	175:80	82
2.	Ciarko PBS Bank KH Sanok	36	25	0	1	1	2	7	179:77	80
3.	JKH GKS Jastrzębie	36	24	1	1	0	2	8	153:61	78
4.	KS Cracovia	36	23	0	2	1	1	9	175:91	75
5.	Podhale Nowy Targ	36	19	1	1	0	2	13	138:81	63
6.	Aksam Unia Oświęcim	36	16	0	2	0	2	16	136:92	54
7.	Orlik Opole	36	13	0	5	0	1	17	100:112	50
8.	Naprzód Janów	36	12	2	0	0	2	20	116:140	42
9.	Polonia Bytom	36	4	0	0	1	0	31	91:238	13
10.	GKS Katowice	36	1	0	0	0	0	35	60:351	3

=== Regular season (second round, Group A) ===
The top 6 teams from the First Round were put in this group to determine the standings before the playoffs. Results from the Second Round are added to results from the First Round.

	Club	GP	W	OTW	SOW	SOL	OTL	L	Goals	Pts
1.	JKH GKS Jastrzębie	46	31	2	2	0	2	7	189:87	103
2.	Ciarko PBS Bank KH Sanok	46	32	0	1	1	3	9	221:99	102
3.	GKS Tychy	46	31	1	1	1	1	11	215:110	99
4.	KS Cracovia	46	27	0	2	1	1	15	204:128	87
5.	Podhale Nowy Targ	46	21	1	1	1	3	19	162:114	71
6.	Aksam Unia Oświęcim	46	17	0	3	1	2	23	156:135	60

=== Regular season (Second Reound, Group B) ===
The bottom 4 teams from the First Round were put in this group to determine the standings before the playoffs. Results from the Second Round are added to results from the First Round.
The top two teams advanced to the playoffs, while the bottom two teams did not. The last place team was relegated.

	Club	GP	W	OTW	SOW	SOL	OTL	L	Goals	Pts
7.	Orlik Opole	48	21	0	5	0	2	20	151:139	75
8.	Naprzód Janów	48	19	3	1	0	2	23	171:180	67
9.	Polonia Bytom	48	10	0	0	2	0	36	145:283	32
10.	GKS Katowice	48	2	0	0	0	0	46	95:434	6

=== Playoffs ===
Quarter-finals
1. JKH GKS Jastrzębie	3
8. Naprzód Janów	0
4. KS Cracovia	0
5. Podhale Nowy Targ	3
2. KH Sanok	3
7. Orlik Opole	0
3. GKS Tychy	2
6. Aksam Unia Oświęcim	1

Semi-finals
1. JKH GKS Jastrzębie	4
5. Podhale Nowy Targ	1
2. KH Sanok	2
3. GKS Tychy	4

Final
3. GKS Tychy	4
1. JKH GKS Jastrzębie	2
Third place
5. Podhale Nowy Targ	2
2. KH Sanok	0
