= Martin Dudáš =

Czech ice hockey player

- Born: March 17, 1987 (age 38); Ostrava, Czechoslovakia
- Height: 6 ft 3 in (191 cm)
- Weight: 220 lb (100 kg; 15 st 10 lb)
- Position: Defence
- Shoots: Left
- Slovak Extraliga team: HC Košice
- Playing career: 2005–present

Martin Dudáš (born March 17, 1987) is a Czech professional ice hockey defenceman. He is playing for HC Košice in the Slovak Extraliga during the 2016-2017 season.
