= Filip Stoklasa =

Czech ice hockey player

- Born: 25 December 1990 (age 34)
- Height: 6 ft 1 in (185 cm)
- Weight: 185 lb (84 kg; 13 st 3 lb)
- Position: Forward
- Shoots: Left
- Czech Extraliga team: HC Pardubice
- Playing career: 2008–present

Filip Stoklasa (born 25 December 1990) is a Czech professional ice hockey forward. He began his career with HC Pardubice in the Czech Extraliga during the 2008–09 Czech Extraliga season.
