= 2011–12 Czech 1. Liga season =

Czech ice hockey season

The 2011–12 Czech 1.liga season was the 19th season of the Czech 1.liga, the second level of ice hockey in the Czech Republic. 14 teams participated in the league, and Piráti Chomutov won the championship.

== Regular season ==
Pl.	Team	GP	W	OTW	OTL	L	Goals	Pts
1.	HC Slovan Ústečtí Lvi	52	37	5	3	7	225:105	124
2.	Piráti Chomutov	52	32	6	4	10	202:116	112
3.	HC Olomouc	52	27	4	6	15	163:122	95
4.	HC Dukla Jihlava	52	28	1	4	19	153:127	90
5.	HC VCES Hradec Králové	52	21	6	2	23	166:147	77
6.	HC Benátky nad Jizerou	52	19	6	7	20	130:153	76
7.	HC Rebel Havlíčkův Brod	52	21	3	4	24	149:160	73
8.	SK Horácká Slavia Třebíč	52	15	8	10	19	132:145	71
9.	HC Stadion Litoměřice	52	19	4	5	24	133:163	70
10.	SK Kadaň	52	20	1	8	23	141:149	70
11.	IHC Písek	52	18	6	4	24	114:146	70
12.	Salith Šumperk	52	17	7	4	24	165:187	69
13.	HC Berounští Medvědi	52	14	6	3	29	127:169	57
14.	HC Most	52	9	4	3	36	113:224	38

== Playoffs ==
Quarter-finals
HC Slovan Ústečtí Lvi	4
SK Horácká Slavia Třebíč	0
HC Dukla Jihlava	4
HC VCES Hradec Králové	3
Piráti Chomutov	4
HC Rebel Havlíčkův Brod	1
HC Olomouc	4
HC Benátky nad Jizerou	3

Semi-finals
HC Slovan Ústečtí Lvi	4
HC Dukla Jihlava	1
Piráti Chomutov	4
HC Olomouc	3

Final
HC Slovan Ústečtí Lvi	3
Piráti Chomutov	4

== Qualification round ==
Pl.	Team	GP	W	OTW	OTL	L	Goals	Pts
1.	IHC KOMTERM Písek	62	23	6	6	27	145:178	87
2.	HC Stadion Litoměřice	62	23	6	5	28	166:197	86
3.	Salith Šumperk	62	22	7	5	28	206:219	85
4.	SK Kadaň	62	24	1	9	28	168:180	83
5.	HC Berounští Medvědi	62	18	7	4	33	166:203	72
6.	HC Most	62	12	6	3	41	145:264	51

== Relegation ==
Pl.	Team	GP	W	OTW	OTL	L	Goals	Pts
1.	HC Berounští Medvědi	8	6	0	0	2	28:20	18
2.	HC Most	8	5	0	0	3	31:19	15
3.	HC AZ Havířov 2010	8	4	1	0	3	31:21	14
4.	SHK Hodonín	8	2	1	0	5	32:40	8
5.	HC Klášterec nad Ohří	8	1	0	2	5	20:42	5
