= Polish Cup (ice hockey) =

The Polish Cup (Polish: Puchar Polski) is the annual national ice hockey cup competition in Poland.

== Editions ==
Edition	Year	Final location	Winner	Finalist
I.	1969/1970	Katowice	Naprzód Janów	Baildon Katowice
II.	1970/1971	Katowice	GKS Katowice	Baildon Katowice
III.	2000	Krynica-Zdrój	Unia Oświęcim	Podhale Nowy Targ
IV.	2001	Tychy	GKS Tychy	GKS Katowice
V.	2002	Warsaw	Unia Oświęcim	Stoczniowiec Gdańsk
VI.	2003	Warsaw	Podhale Nowy Targ	TKH Toruń
VII.	2004	Warsaw	Podhale Nowy Targ	Unia Oświęcim
VIII.	2005	Nowy Targ	TKH Toruń	Podhale Nowy Targ
IX.	2006	Toruń	GKS Tychy	Stoczniowiec Gdańsk
X.	2007	Tychy	GKS Tychy	Cracovia
XI.	2008	Gdańsk	GKS Tychy	Stoczniowiec Gdańsk
XII.	2009	Tychy	GKS Tychy	Naprzód Janów
XIII.	2010	Oświęcim	Ciarko PBS Bank Sanok	Unia Oświęcim
XIV.	2011	Sanok	Ciarko PBS Bank Sanok	Unia Oświęcim
XV.	2012	Sanok	JKH GKS Jastrzębie	Ciarko PBS Bank Sanok
XVI.	2013	Sanok	Cracovia	Ciarko PBS Bank Sanok
XVII.	2014	Kraków	GKS Tychy	Ciarko PBS Bank Sanok
XVIII.	2015	Nowy Targ	Cracovia	Podhale Nowy Targ
XIX.	2016	Nowy Targ	GKS Tychy	Cracovia
XX.	2017	Kraków	GKS Tychy	Cracovia
XXI.	2018	Tychy	JKH GKS Jastrzębie	Podhale Nowy Targ
XXII.	2019	Tychy	JKH GKS Jastrzębie	Unia Oświęcim
XXIII.	2020/2021	Katowice	JKH GKS Jastrzębie	Unia Oświęcim
XXIV.	2021	Bytom	GKS Tychy	KS Toruń
XXV.	2022	Oświęcim	Cracovia	Unia Oświęcim
XXVI.	2023	Krynica-Zdrój	GKS Tychy	JKH GKS Jastrzębie
XXVII.	2024	Krynica-Zdrój	GKS Tychy	JKH GKS Jastrzębie

- Note: Cup was not contested between 1972–1999
