= TMH Polonia Bytom =

- City: Bytom, Poland
- League: Polska Hokej Liga
- Founded: 1946; 80 years ago
- Home arena: OSIR Bytom "Stodoła"
- Colours: Blue, Red
- General manager: (Poland) Slawomir Budzinski
- Head coach: (Belarus) Andrei Gusov
- Website: bytomski-hokej.pl

TMH Polonia Bytom is a professional ice hockey team in Bytom, Poland. They currently play in the Polska Hokej Liga (PHL).

== History ==
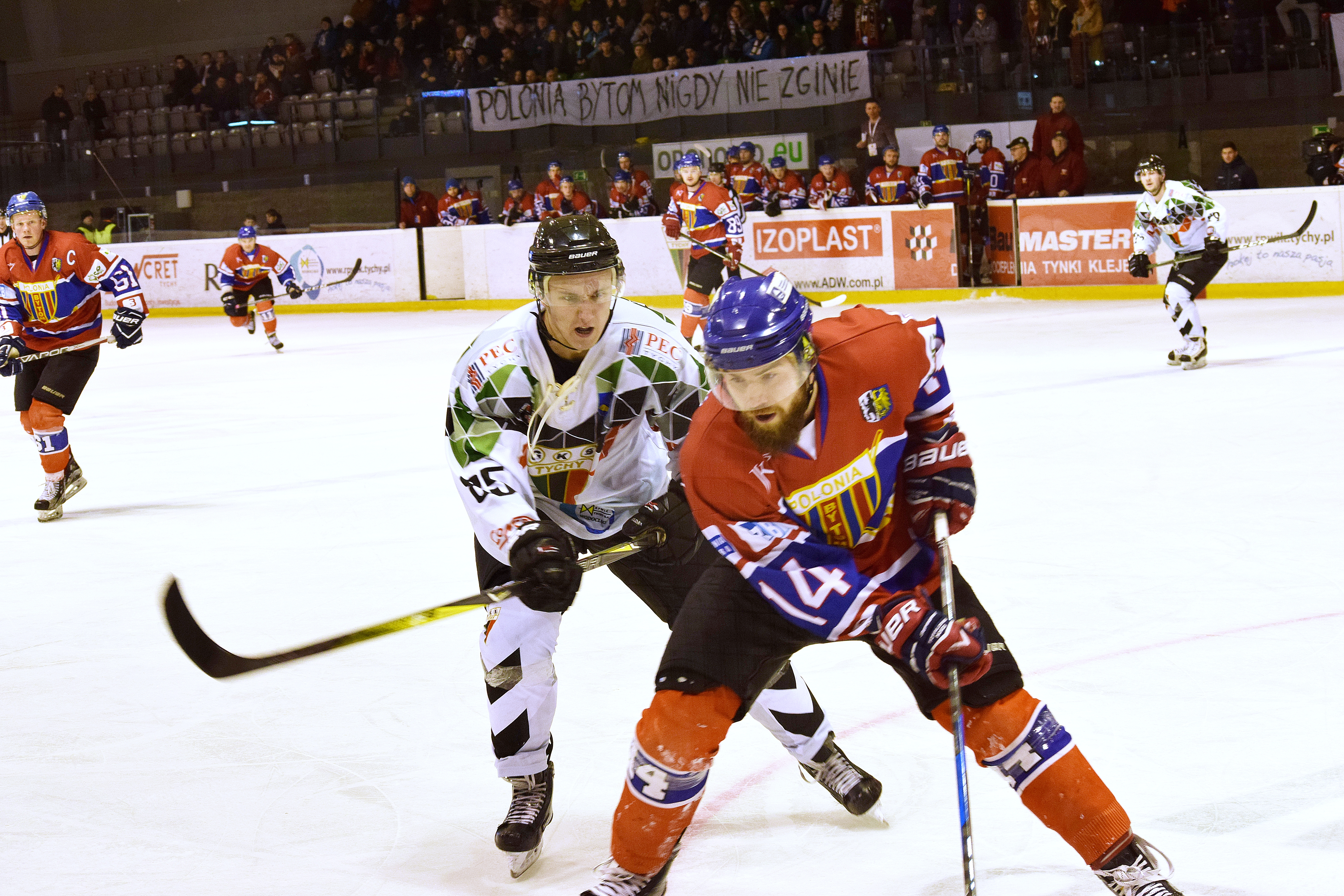
Polska Hokej Liga match with GKS Tychy, 2018

The sports society was created in 1920, with the ice hockey club being founded in 1946. Polonia won six Polska Liga Hokejowa titles in the 1980s and 1990s, and three Polish 1. Liga titles in the 1980s and 2000s.

== Achievements ==
- Polish champion : 1984, 1986, 1988, 1989, 1990, 1991.
- Polish 1. Liga champion : 1981, 2000, 2007.

== Players ==
=== Current roster ===
Source: eliteprospects.comAs of November 8, 2021.

No.	Nat	Player	Pos	S/G	Age	Acquired	Birthplace
97	(Poland)	Piotr Bajon	F	R	28	2014	Bytom, Poland
8	(Poland)	Aleksander Bodora	F	L	26	2020	Ruda Śląska, Poland
12	(Kazakhstan)	Andrei Buyalsky	C	L	25	2025	Karaganda, Kazakhstan
30	(Ukraine)	Bogdan Dyachenko	G	L	27	2025	Kharkiv, Ukraine
17	(Poland)	Kamil Gorny (C)	D	L	36	2025	Jastrzębie-Zdrój, Poland
9	(Poland)	Dominik Jarosz	LW	L	27	2025	Rybnik, Poland
1	(Poland)	Tobiasz Jaworski	G	L	18	2025	Bytom, Poland
6	(Poland)	Yevgeni Kamenev	D	R	29	2025	Minsk, Belarus
38	(Poland)	Arkadiusz Karasinski	F	R	22	2025	Łódź, Poland
76	(Finland)	Leevi Karjalainen	D	L	26	2025	Helsinki, Finland
26	(Poland)	Dominik Kasprzyk	F	L	24	2023	Katowice, Poland
19	(Poland)	Mikolaj Kociszewski	RW	L	22	2019	Warsaw, Poland
31	(Belarus)	Matvei Kuznetsov	G	L	20	2022	Gomel, Belarus
29	(Finland)	Miro Lehtimäki	F	R	29	2025	Kiukainen, Finland
94	(Poland)	Christian Mroczkowski	RW	L	31	2025	Wellesley, Ontario, Canada
34	(Poland)	Dawid Musiol	D	L	29	2025	Katowice, Poland
77	(Latvia)	Ernests Osenieks	D	L	24	2025	Riga, Latvia
21	(Ukraine)	Pavel Padakin	RW	R	31	2025	Kyiv, Ukraine
16	(Poland)	Tymoteusz Petrazycki	F	L	19	2025	Minsk, Belarus
74	(Poland)	Michal Proczek	D	L	23	2021	Siemianowice Śląskie, Poland
58	(Poland)	Marat Saroka	C	R	22	2026	Warsaw, Poland
13	(Poland)	Radoslaw Sawicki	F	L	30	2025	Sanok, Poland
14	(Poland)	Jan Stepien	D	R	22	2019	Bytom, Poland
10	(Poland)	Sebastian Wicher	F	L	23	2019	Bytom, Poland
27	(Poland)	Pawel Wybiral	F	L	22	2019	Warsaw, Poland
88	(Belarus)	Dmitri Zalamay	D	R	31	2025	Minsk, Belarus
61	(Poland)	Michal Zajac	F	L	24	2025	Bytom, Poland
