= GKS Tychy (ice hockey) =

- City: Tychy, Poland
- League: Polska Hokej Liga
- Founded: 20 April 1971; 55 years ago
- Home arena: Stadion Zimowy w Tychach (capacity: 2,753)
- Colours: Green, black, red
- President: Grzegorz Bednarski
- General manager: Wojciech Matczak
- Head coach: Andrei Gusov
- Website: gkstychy.info/hokej/

Górniczy Klub Sportowy (GKS) Tychy is a professional ice hockey team based in Tychy, Poland. The team competes in the Polska Hokej Liga, the highest league in Poland.

The club was founded on 20 April 1971. GKS Tychy are six-time Polish champions, having won the 2005, 2015, 2018, 2019, 2020 and 2025 titles. The club has also won eleven Polish Cup titles, in 2001, 2006–2009, 2014, 2016, 2017, 2022, 2023, 2024, making them the first Polish team to win the Cup three years in a row and to have never lost a Polish Cup final. Furthermore, GKS Tychy is the first Polish club who won a medal of European Cup with a third place in 2016 Continental Cup. Stadion Zimowy, the home arena of GKS Tychy, has a capacity of 2,753 seats.

== Players ==
- John Murray
- Jakub Zawalski
- Denis Akimoto
- Bartosz Ciura
- Alexander Yeronov
- Adam Baginski
- Mike Cichy
- Gleb Klimenko
- Christian Mroczkowski
- Alex Szczechura
- Mike Szmatula
- Alexei Yefimenko

== Major achievements ==
Competition	Titles	Seasons
Polish Championships	7	2005, 2015, 2018, 2019, 2020, 2025, 2026
Polish Championships	9	Runners-up: 1988, 2006, 2007, 2008, 2009, 2011, 2014, 2016, 2017
Polish Championships	6	Third place: 1981, 1983, 2002, 2004, 2010, 2013
Polish Cup	11	2001, 2006, 2007, 2008, 2009, 2014, 2016, 2017, 2022, 2023, 2024
Polish SuperCup	2	2015, 2018
Polish SuperCup	1	Runners-up: 2017
IIHF Continental Cup	1	Third place: 2016

== Famous players ==
- Henryk Gruth
- Krzysztof Oliwa
- Mariusz Czerkawski
- Michał Garbocz
