= 2008–09 Czech 1. Liga season =

The 2008–09 Czech 1.liga season was the 16th season of the 1st Czech Republic Hockey League, the second level of ice hockey in the Czech Republic. 16 teams participated in the league, and HC Slovan Ustecti Lvi won the championship.

== Regular season ==
	Club	GP	W	OTW	OTL	L	Goals	Pts
1.	HC Slovan Ústečtí Lvi	46	32	6	2	6	152:77	110
2.	HC Kometa Brno	46	29	3	7	7	172:105	100
3.	KLH Chomutov	46	26	8	3	9	180:104	97
4.	HC Vrchlabí	46	27	5	5	9	134:106	96
5.	HC Chrudim	46	22	4	6	14	144:128	80
6.	HC VCES Hradec Králové	46	20	4	5	17	148:122	73
7.	HC Dukla Jihlava	46	19	2	4	21	126:138	65
8.	HC Olomouc	46	16	6	2	22	129:121	62
9.	HC Rebel Havlíčkův Brod	46	17	3	3	23	112:127	60
10.	HC Havířov	46	14	5	5	22	118:143	57
11.	SK Kadaň	46	12	8	4	22	120:135	56
12.	HC Benátky nad Jizerou	46	16	2	3	25	98:147	55
13.	SK Horácká Slavia Třebíč	46	13	4	7	22	131:149	54
14.	HC Berounští Medvědi	46	13	4	4	25	83:125	51
15.	HC Most	46	12	3	5	26	111:162	47
16.	HC VOKD Poruba	46	12	1	3	30	93:162	41

== Pre-Playoffs ==
- HC Chrudim – HC Benátky nad Jizerou 0:3 (2:3 n.P., 2:3 n.V., 2:5)
- HC VCES Hradec Králové – SK Kadaň 3:1 (4:1, 3:2, 2:5, 4:2)
- HC Dukla Jihlava – HC Havířov 3:1 (3:1, 4:2, 1:2, 2:1)
- HC Olomouc – HC Rebel Havlíčkův Brod 3:1 (1:2, 7:2, 5:2, 1:0)

== Playoffs ==
=== Quarterfinals ===
- HC Slovan Ústečtí Lvi – HC Benátky nad Jizerou 6:1 (1:0, 2:1, 3:0)
- HC Slovan Ústečtí Lvi – HC Benátky nad Jizerou 3:1 (1:0, 0:1, 2:0)
- HC Benátky nad Jizerou – HC Slovan Ústečtí Lvi 2:3 (0:0, 1:2, 1:1)
- HC Benátky nad Jizerou – HC Slovan Ústečtí Lvi 4:0 (3:0, 1:0, 0:0)
- HC Slovan Ústečtí Lvi – HC Benátky nad Jizerou 9:3 (4:0, 4:1, 1:2)
- HC Kometa Brno – HC Olomouc 4:1 (1:0, 3:0, 0:1)
- HC Kometa Brno – HC Olomouc 3:1 (2:1, 1:0, 0:0)
- HC Olomouc – HC Kometa Brno 2:4 (1:2, 1:1, 0:1)
- HC Olomouc – HC Kometa Brno 2:3 SN (0:0, 1:0, 1:2 – 0:0)
- KLH Chomutov – HC Dukla Jihlava 2:1 PP (0:0, 0:0, 1:1 – 1:0)
- KLH Chomutov – HC Dukla Jihlava 4:2 (2:0, 1:1, 1:1)
- HC Dukla Jihlava – KLH Chomutov 3:4 (0:0, 1:1, 2:3)
- HC Dukla Jihlava – KLH Chomutov 2:4 (1:2, 1:0, 0:2)
- HC Vrchlabí – HC VCES Hradec Králové 5:3 (2:2, 0:0, 3:1)
- HC Vrchlabí – HC VCES Hradec Králové 2:4 (1:1, 0:0, 1:3)
- HC VCES Hradec Králové – HC Vrchlabí 4:3 (1:1, 3:1, 0:1)
- HC VCES Hradec Králové – HC Vrchlabí 3:2 PP (1:0, 1:1, 0:1 – 1:0)
- HC Vrchlabí – HC VCES Hradec Králové 4:2 (1:0, 2:1, 1:1)
- HC VCES Hradec Králové – HC Vrchlabí 3:0 (0:0, 2:0, 1:0)

=== Semifinals ===
- HC Kometa Brno – KLH Chomutov 1:2 PP (0:1, 1:0, 0:0 – 0:1)
- HC Kometa Brno – KLH Chomutov 4:2 (0:0, 2:1, 2:1)
- KLH Chomutov – HC Kometa Brno 5:1 (3:0, 2:1, 0:0)
- KLH Chomutov – HC Kometa Brno 2:6 (1:3, 0:3, 1:0)
- HC Kometa Brno – KLH Chomutov 1:4 (0:0, 0:2, 1:2)
- KLH Chomutov – HC Kometa Brno 1:2 SN (0:1, 1:0, 0:0 – 0:0 – 0:1)
- HC Kometa Brno – KLH Chomutov 3:0 (1:0, 0:0, 2:0)
- HC Slovan Ústečtí Lvi – HC VCES Hradec Králové 2:3 (0:1, 1:2, 1:0)
- HC Slovan Ústečtí Lvi – HC VCES Hradec Králové 3:2 SN (1:0, 0:1, 1:1 – 0:0)
- HC VCES Hradec Králové – HC Slovan Ústečtí Lvi 2:0 (0:0, 2:0, 0:0)
- HC VCES Hradec Králové – HC Slovan Ústečtí Lvi 1:2 (1:1, 0:1, 0:0)
- HC Slovan Ústečtí Lvi – HC VCES Hradec Králové 3:1 (1:0, 2:1, 0:0)
- HC VCES Hradec Králové – HC Slovan Ústečtí Lvi 4:6 (1:0, 1:3, 2:3)

=== Final ===
- HC Slovan Ustecti Lvi – HC Kometa Brno 5–3, 3–1, 1–5, 1–3, 3–1, 2–1

== Qualification round ==
	Club	GP	W	OTW	OTL	L	Goals	Pts
1.	SK Horácká Slavia Třebíč	58	19	6	8	25	178:181	77
2.	HC Berounští Medvědi	58	19	4	7	27	121:150	75
3.	HC Most	58	17	4	7	30	155:204	66
4.	HC VOKD Poruba	58	12	4	3	38	118:215	47
