= GKS Katowice (ice hockey) =

- City: Katowice, Poland
- League: Polska Hokej Liga
- Founded: 27 February 1964; 62 years ago
- Home arena: Spodek
- Colours: Green, yellow, black
- Head coach: Jacek Płachta
- Website: hokej.gkskatowice.eu

GKS Katowice, officially known as GKS GieKSa Katowice S.A., is a professional ice hockey team based in Katowice, Poland. The team competes in the Polska Hokej Liga, the highest league in Poland. The team has won six Polska championships titles between 1958 and 1970. From 2017 to 2019 the name of the club was changed to Tauron KH GKS Katowice, due to sponsorship by Tauron Group. The club finished the regular season 2021-2022 in 1st place and won the playoffs by defeating Zagłębie Sosnowiec, GKS Tychy and Unia Oświęcim.

== Notable members ==
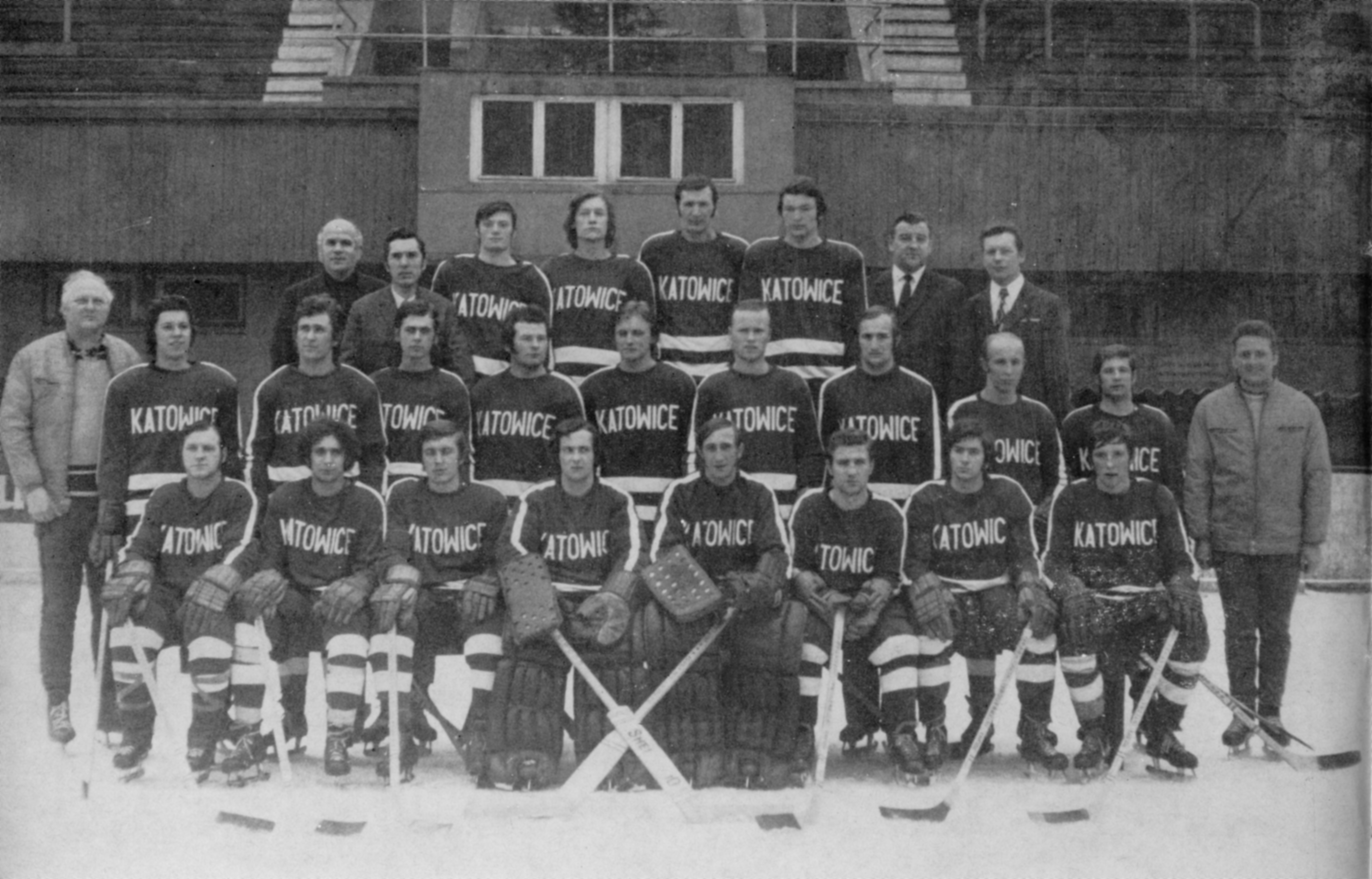
GKS Katowice ice hockey team in 1973

The original coaches for GKS Katowice were Aggie Kukulowicz, and Stanislav Konopásek.

== Achievements ==
Polish championship:

- 1st place (8): 1958, 1960, 1962, 1965, 1968, 1970, 2022, 2023
- 2nd place (10): 1956, 1957, 1959, 1961, 1967, 1969, 2001, 2002, 2003, 2018
- 3rd place (10): 1955, 1963, 1966, 1975, 1994, 1995, 1997, 1998, 2019, 2020

IIHF Continental Cup:

- 3rd place (2): 2019, 2025

Polish cup:

- Winner (1): 1970
- Finalist (1): 2001

2nd ligue:

- 1st place (1): 2012

Autosan cup:

- 1st place (3): 1973, 1975, 1976

== Champions Hockey League ==
GKS Katowice will make its Champions Hockey League debut in the 2022-23 season. The team will face Rögle BK, ZSC Lions and Fehérvár AV19.

== Players in the season 2021/2022 ==
Goaltenders:

- (Poland) 21 Maciej Miarka
- (Poland) 31 John Murray
- (United States) 33 Albert Rogers

Defensemen:

- (Canada) 2 Carl Hudson
- (Russia) 98 Aleksandr Jakimienko
- (Poland) 4 Oskar Krawczyk
- (Poland) 12 Maciej Kruczek (A)
- (Poland) 34 Dawid Musioł
- (Poland) 97 Mateusz Rompkowski
- (Finland) 22 Kalle Valtola
- (Poland) 8 Patryk Wajda (A)
- (Poland) 5 Jakub Wanacki

Forwards:

- (Poland) 24 Mateusz Bepierszcz
- (Poland) 19 Piotr Ciepielewski
- (Sweden) 53 Anthon Eriksson
- (Poland) 10 Bartosz Fraszko
- (Poland) 88 Patryk Krężołek
- (Germany) 23 David Lebek
- (Finland) 7 Mathias Lehtonen
- (Poland) 92 Mateusz Michalski
- (Finland) 81 Joona Monto
- (Poland) 75 Szymon Mularczyk
- (Poland) 18 Grzegorz Pasiut (C)
- (Poland) 11 Jakub Prokurat
- (Finland) 77 Miro-Pekka Saarelainen
- (Poland) 48 Igor Smal
- (Poland) 86 Filip Wielkiewicz
- (Poland) 95 Patryk Wronka
