= Cracovia (ice hockey) =

Comarch Cracovia
- City: Kraków, Poland
- League: Polska Hokej Liga
- Founded: 1906 (club); 1923 (ice hockey section)
- Home arena: Lodowisko im. Adama "Rocha" Kowalskiego
- Colours: Red, white
- General manager: Mateusz Dróżdż
- Head coach: Marek Ziętara
- Website: cracovia-hokej.pl

Franchise history
- 1923–1997: KS Cracovia
- 1997-2023: MKS Cracovia SSA
- 2023-present: KS Cracovia SA

Cracovia, commonly erroneously referred to as Cracovia Kraków and playing as Comarch Cracovia for sponsorship reasons, is a professional ice hockey team based in Kraków, Poland. The team competes in the Polska Hokej Liga, the highest league in Poland. With 12 Polish championships (as of 2025), it is one of the most accomplished Polish ice hockey teams.

== History ==
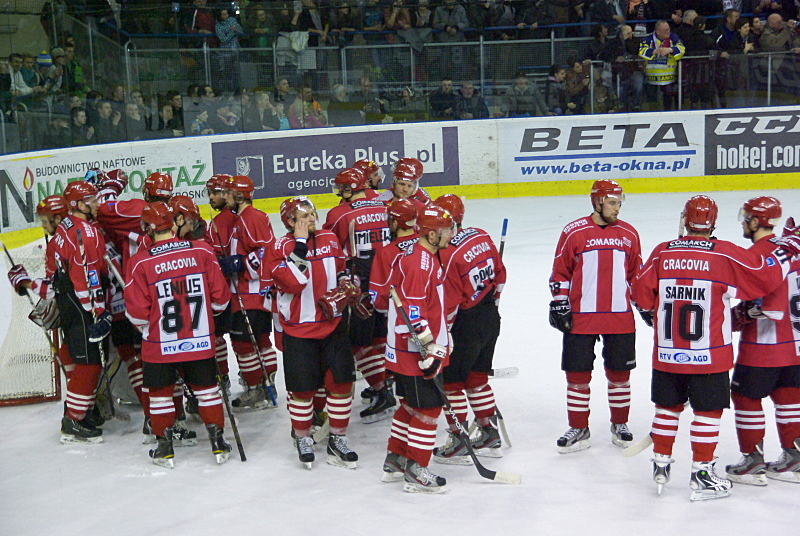
Cracovia players during the 2011–12 Polska Liga Hokejowa season.

Founded in 1906, Cracovia is the oldest existing sports club in Poland. Ice hockey in the form of bandy had been first played around 1909, and the first North American style ice hockey game was played in 1912. The ice hockey section of the sports club was created in 1923. Currently, the men's ice hockey section functions independently, and is legally called MKS Cracovia SSA. The women's section continues to function under the sports society of KS Cracovia.

The men's professional team won five league titles in the 1930s and 1940s. It took them 57 years to win another league title after winning in 1949. They finally won the PLH again in 2006, and have since added six more titles, in 2008, 2009, 2011, 2013, 2016 and 2017.

They are also the first Polish team to compete in the Champions Hockey League. They made their debut in the 2016–17 edition, where they were put into a group with Färjestad BK from the Swedish Hockey League and HC Sparta Praha from the Czech Extraliga. They would lose all four group stage matches.

== Achievements ==
Competition	Placement	Titles / Podiums	Seasons / Years
Polish Championship	Winners	12	1937, 1946, 1947, 1948, 1949, 2006, 2008, 2009, 2011, 2013, 2016, 2017
Polish Cup	Winners	3	2013, 2015, 2021
Polish SuperCup	Winners	3	2014, 2016, 2017
IIHF Continental Cup	Winners	1	2022
Polish 1. Liga	Champions	4	1965, 1967, 1977, 2004

== Players ==
=== Current roster ===
Source: cracovia-hokej.plSource: eliteprospects.comAs of November 8, 2021.

No.	Nat	Player	Pos	S/G	Age	Acquired	Birthplace
–	(Russia)	Denis Perevozchikov	G	L	33	2020	Perm, Russia
90	(Czech Republic)	Aleš Ježek	D	L	36	2018	Tábor, Czechoslovakia
15	(Canada)	Collin Shirley	LW	L	30	2021	Saskatoon, Saskatchewan, Canada
–	(Poland)	Lukasz Hebda	G	L	26	2019	Krynica-Zdrój, Poland
16	(Finland)	Saku Kinnunen	D	L	31	2021	Kuhmo, Finland
95	(Poland)	Damian Kapica	RW	L	34	2015	Nowy Targ, Poland
89	(Czech Republic)	Jiří Gula	D	R	37	2019	Most, Czechoslovakia
94	(Czech Republic)	Štěpán Csamangó	RW	R	32	2020	Czech Republic
3	(Poland)	Patryk Gosztyla	D	L	26	2019	Krynica-Zdrój, Poland
–	(Finland)	Jere Karlsson	D	L	30	2021	Turku, Finland
88	(Russia)	Artyom Voroshilo	RW	L	38	2021	Suoyarvi, Russia
11	(Poland)	Antoni Dziurdzia	F	L	25	2017	Kraków, Poland
2	(Czech Republic)	Martin Dudáš	D	L	39	2020	Ostrava, Czechoslovakia
72	(Poland)	David Zabolotny	G	L	32	2021	Frankfurt am Main, Germany
49	(Czech Republic)	Jakub Müller	D	R	27	2021	Slaný, Czech Republic
32	(Russia)	Grigori Mishchenko	LW	R	34	2021	Kanibadam, Tajikistan
33	(Czech Republic)	Jakub Šaur	D	L	34	2020	Brno, Czechoslovakia
10	(Russia)	Yevgeni Bodrov	C	L	38	2021	Tolyatti, Russia
81	(Poland)	Mateusz Bezwinski	D	L	24	2019	Kraków, Poland
14	(Czech Republic)	Erik Němec	LW	L	32	2020	Metylovice, Czech Republic
12	(Poland)	Michal Jaracz	D	L	23	2018	Skawina, Poland
43	(Russia)	Maxim Ignatovich	D	R	35	2020	Novosibirsk, Russia
71	(Poland)	Sebastian Brynkus	F	L	25	2018	Nowy Targ, Poland
24	(Russia)	Dmitri Ismagilov	F	L	33	2021	Chelyabinsk, Russia
13	(Russia)	Yevgeni Popitich	F	L	31	2021	Perm, Russia
8	(Poland)	Łukasz Kamiński	F	L	27	2018	Nowy Targ, Poland
50	(Russia)	Ivan Yatsenko	C	L	34	2021	Yekaterinburg, Russia
7	(Poland)	Igor Augustyniak	F	R	24	2019	Tychy, Poland
