= HC Most =

- City: Most, Czech Republic
- Founded: 1946
- Dissolved: 2017
- Home arena: Zimní stadion Most
- Colours
- Head coach: Jan Peroutka

Franchise history
- 1946-1951: Hokejový oddíl UHLOMOST
- 1951-2007: SK Banik Most
- 2007-2017: HC Most

HC Most was an ice hockey team in Most, Czech Republic. They played in the Czech 1.liga, the second level of Czech ice hockey. The club was founded in 1946.

== Achievements ==
- Czech 2.liga champion: 2004, 2007
