= SK Trhači Kadaň =

- City: Kadaň, Czech Republic
- Founded: 1945
- Folded: 2021
- Home arena: Zimní stadion Kadaň
- Colours: Black, Yellow, White

Franchise history
- 1945-1964: Tatran Kadaň
- 1945-1964: Slovan Kadaň
- 1964-1991: TJ DNT Kadaň
- 1991-2017: Sportovní Klub Kadaň
- 2017-2022: SK Trhači Kadaň

SK Trhači Kadaň was an ice hockey team in Kadaň, Czech Republic. The club was founded in 1945 and defunct in 2021. Having played at the second level of Czech hockey since the 1998–99 Czech 1. Liga season, Kadaň withdrew from the 1st Czech Republic Hockey League in November 2021, having lost all of their 18 games played with a goal difference of 26 for and 89 against.

== Achievements ==
- Czech 2.liga champion: 1998.
