= Polska Hokej Liga =

Top division of the Polish ice hockey league

- Current season, competition or edition: 2025–26 Polska Hokej Liga season
- Sport: Ice hockey
- Founded: 26 April 2013 (13 years ago)
- Founder: Polish Ice Hockey Federation
- First season: 2013–14
- CEO: Mirosław Minkina
- No. of teams: 9
- Country: Poland
- Headquarters: Katowice
- Most recent champion: GKS Tychy (6th title)
- Most titles: GKS Tychy (6 titles)
- Broadcaster: TVP Sport
- Relegation to: Polish 1. Liga
- Related competitions: Polish Cup; Polish 1. Liga
- Website: polskihokej.eu

The Polska Hokej Liga (PHL) is the premier ice hockey league in Poland. The highest professional level of ice hockey in Poland is the Polish Hockey League (PHL); also referred to as the Polska Hokej Liga. Previously, it was known as the I Liga or Ekstraklasa from 1926 to 1999, and the Polska Liga Hokejowa from 1999 to 2013. In 2013, it was reorganized as a limited liability company and renamed the Polska Hokej Liga. It follows a system of relegation to and promotion to/from the Polish 1. Liga.

In the 2021–22 season, nine hockey clubs spread across Poland made up the league. Teams from the PHL can participate in the IIHF's annual Champions Hockey League (CHL), competing for the European Trophy. Participation is based on the strength of the various leagues in Europe (excluding the European/Asian Kontinental Hockey League). Going into the 2022–23 CHL season, the PHL was ranked the No. 12 league in Europe, allowing them to send their top team to compete in the CHL.

== History ==
The championship started with the 1925–26 season. At first, it was a non-league system composed of regional tournaments. The tournaments had two stages. The best teams qualified to the final tournament, of which the winner was declared champion. In 1938, the Polish Ice Hockey Federation decided to reorganize the championship, by creating a league system. Those plans were abandoned due to the outbreak of World War II.

The current structure of the league began in 1955.

== Teams ==
Teams of the 2022–23 PHL season.
Location of teams in the Katowice urban area

Team	City	Arena	Capacity	Founded
Cracovia	Kraków	Sztuczne Lodowiski A. R. Kowalskiego	4,500	1923
GKS Katowice	Katowice	Satelita Spodek	1,500	1964
GKS Tychy	Tychy	Stadion Zimowy MOSiR	5,000	1971
JKH GKS Jastrzębie	Jastrzebie Zdroj	Jastor	1,580	1963
KH Energa Toruń	Toruń	Tor-Tor	3,500	1924
KH Zagłębie Sosnowiec	Sosnowiec	Nowy Stadion Zimowy	2,545	1933 (Original) 1998 (Current)
STS Sanok	Sanok	Arena Sanok	3,100	1958 (Original) 2020 (Current)
TH Unia Oświęcim	Oświęcim	Hala Lodowa	3,500	1958
TMH Polonia Bytom	Bytom	Lodowisko im. Braci Nikodemowiczów OSiR Bytom	1,500	1946

== Medalists ==
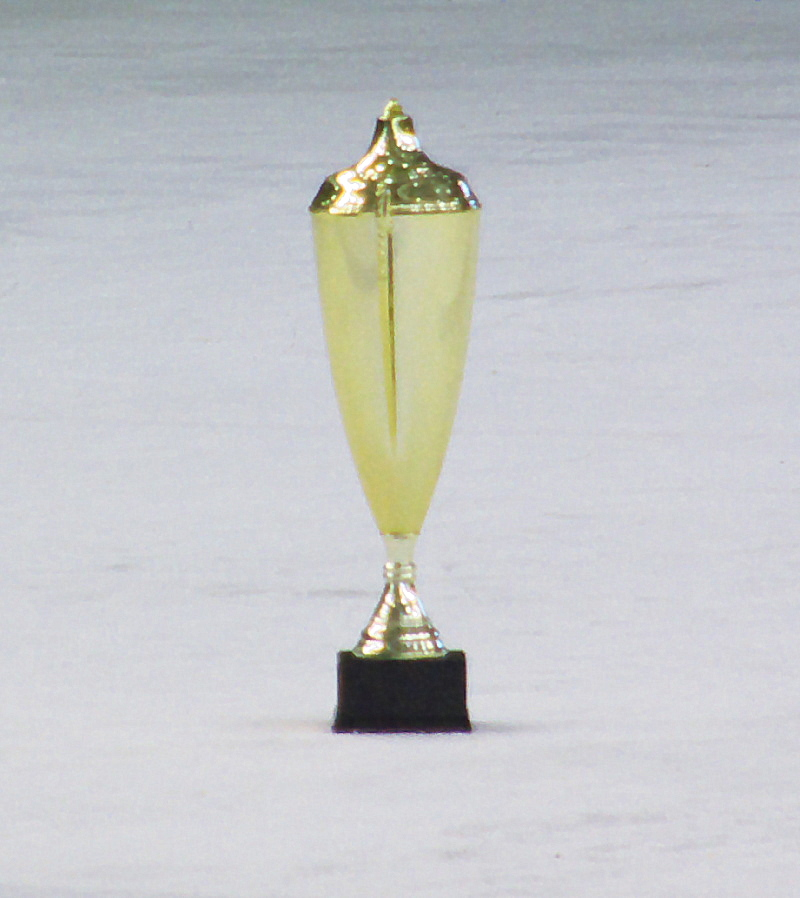
Polish championship trophy

Season	Winner	2nd place	3rd place	Regular season
2013–14	KH Sanok	GKS Tychy	GKS Jastrzębie	GKS Tychy
2014–15	GKS Tychy	GKS Jastrzębie	Podhale Nowy Targ	GKS Jastrzębie
2015–16	Cracovia	GKS Tychy	Podhale Nowy Targ	Cracovia
2016–17	Cracovia	GKS Tychy	Polonia Bytom	GKS Tychy
2017–18	GKS Tychy	GKS Katowice	Podhale Nowy Targ	GKS Tychy
2018–19	GKS Tychy	Cracovia	GKS Katowice	GKS Katowice
2019–20	GKS Tychy	Unia Oświęcim	GKS Jastrzębie	GKS Tychy
2020–21	GKS Jastrzębie	Cracovia	GKS Tychy	GKS Katowice
2021–22	GKS Katowice	Unia Oświęcim	GKS Jastrzębie	GKS Tychy
2022–23	GKS Katowice	GKS Tychy	Unia Oświęcim	Cracovia
2023–24	Unia Oświęcim	GKS Katowice	GKS Tychy	GKS Katowice
2024–25	GKS Tychy	GKS Katowice	GKS Jastrzębie	GKS Tychy
2025–26	GKS Tychy	GKS Katowice	GKS Sosnowiec	GKS Katowice

== See also ==
- Polish Cup (ice hockey)
