= Leszek Laszkiewicz =

Polish ice hockey player (born 1978)

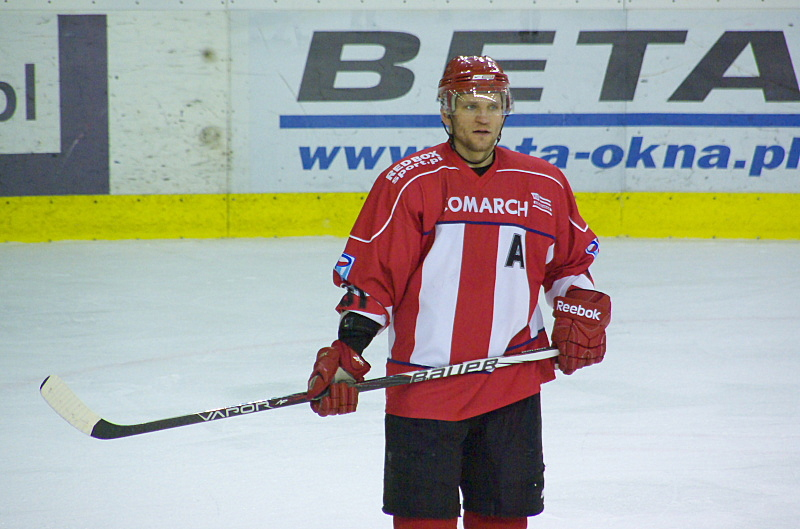
- Laszkiewicz in 2012
- Born: 11 August 1978 (age 47) Jastrzębie-Zdrój, Poland
- Height: 6 ft 1 in (185 cm)
- Weight: 185 lb (84 kg; 13 st 3 lb)
- Position: Left wing
- Shot: Right
- Played for: KH Zagłębie Sosnowiec; SMS PZHL Sosnowiec; Nürnberg Ice Tigers; KTH Krynica; TH Unia Oświęcim; HC Vítkovice Steel; AZ Havířov; Milano Vipers; Cracovia Krakow; JKH GKS Jastrzębie
- National team: Poland
- Playing career: 1996–2018

Leszek Laszkiewicz (born 11 August 1978) is a Polish ice hockey executive, and former player in professional leagues and member of the Poland men's national ice hockey team. Representing Poland from 1995 to 2015, he played at two European Junior Championships, two World Junior Championships, and eighteen consecutive Ice Hockey World Championships. He appeared in 216 games for the men's national team, scored 89 goals and 150 points, and was the team captain from 2008 to 2011. Nicknamed "Laszka", he received the Torriani Award when inducted into the IIHF Hall of Fame in 2025.

In professional hockey, Laszkiewicz won the Polska Liga Hokejowa playoffs gold medal eight times; three with TH Unia Oświęcim, and five with Cracovia as teammate of his brother Daniel. Voted by fellow players as the best player in the Polish league in three consecutive seasons, Laszkiewicz scored his 1,000th career point in 2017, and retired as the all-time Polska Liga Hokejowa points-scoring leader. He also played four seasons combined in the Deutsche Eishockey Liga, the Czech Extraliga, and the Italian Hockey League Serie A; and won the Coppa Italia and the playoffs championship with the Milano Vipers.

As general manager of the Poland men's national team, Laszkiewicz saw them promoted twice from lower World Championships divisions to their first appearance in the top division since 2002. Since he became general manager of JKH GKS Jastrzebie in the 2018–19 season, Jastrzebie won the Polish Cup three times, won the Polish super cup in 2020, and won the Polska Liga Hokejowa playoffs gold medal in the 2020–21 season.

== Personal life ==
Leszek Laszkiewicz was born on 11 August 1978, in Jastrzębie-Zdrój, Poland, where he grew up playing ice hockey from an early age. He also played basketball, football, and volleyball as a youth, and described himself as a "troublemaker student" who preferred sports instead of studying. He graduated from SMS PZHL Sosnowiec, the sports championship high school of the Polish Ice Hockey Federation (PZHL) at Sosnowiec. His older brother, Daniel, also played professional hockey.

Laszkiewicz is married to Katarzyna. He has two daughters and advocates for parents to teach fitness and sports to their children to be physically healthy, and for building character and social skills.

== Playing career ==
=== Professional ===
In professional the Polska Liga Hokejowa (PLH), Laszkiewicz played a portion of the 1996–97 season with KH Zagłębie Sosnowiec. The remainder of the season was played with the SMS PZHL Sosnowiec junior ice hockey team in the Eastern European Hockey League. The PZHL placed the country's best junior players on its Olympic team Eastern European League, but did not participate in the league's 1996–97 season playoffs. In 20 league games with the Olympic team, Laszkiewicz scored ten goals and six assists. Joining the Nürnberg Ice Tigers in Germany, Laszkiewicz played the next two seasons in the professional Deutsche Eishockey Liga. As one of the youngest players in the league, he helped the Tigers to a second-place finish in the 1998–99 season playoffs, followed by a loss to Adler Mannheim in the final series.

Returning to Poland to play the 1999–2000 PLH season, Laszkiewicz won the playoffs bronze medal with KTH Krynica. Playing for TH Unia Oświęcim during the 2000–01 and 2001–02 seasons, he scored 20 goals in consecutive years, and won the playoffs gold medal twice. Playing in the Czech Extraliga for the 2002–03 season, he transferred mid-season from HC Vítkovice Steel to HC Havířov. His latter team placed last in the regular season, then lost a playoffs series which relegated them to the 1st Czech National Hockey League. Reuniting with Unia Oświęcim for the 2003–04 season, Laszkiewicz achieved his third PLH season with at least 20 goals, and won a third playoffs gold medal.

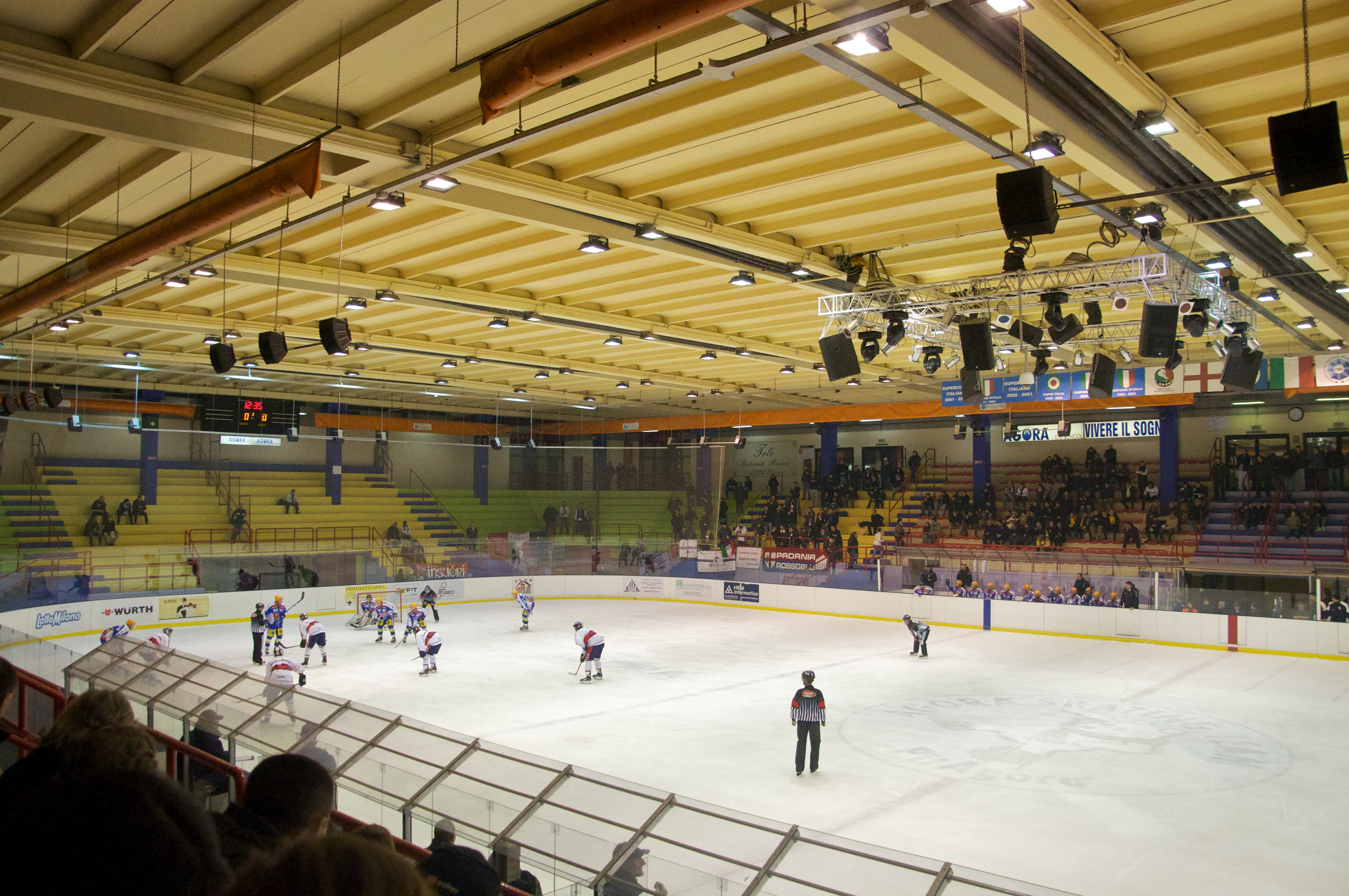
Agorà Ice Stadium was the home rink of the Milano Vipers.

Laszkiewicz played the 2004–05 season for the Milano Vipers in the Italian Hockey League Serie A. He played with an against National Hockey League (NHL) players due to the 2004–05 NHL lockout, gaining experience at a higher caliber of play. He scored 19 times in the regular season, the second most goals on the team behind Daniel Tkaczuk who scored 24. The Vipers placed first in the regular season, won the Coppa Italia, and won the league's playoffs final in a seven-game series versus SG Cortina.

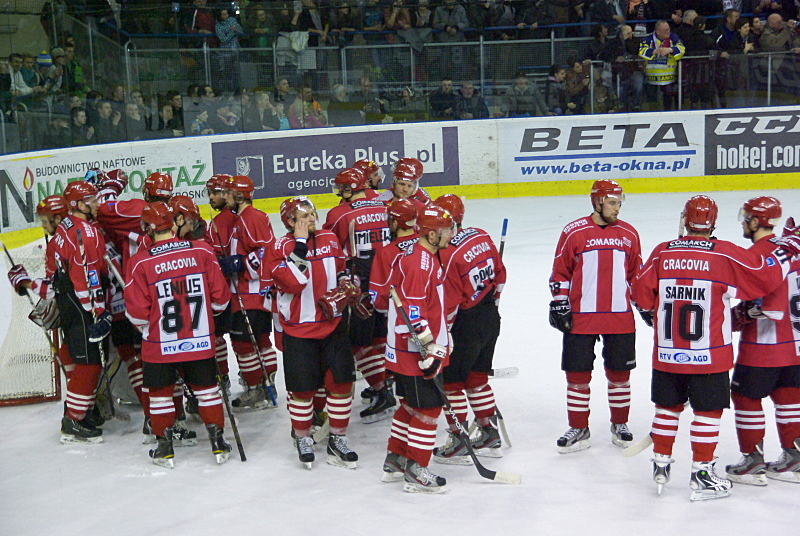
Cracovia players during the 2011–12 season

In the next eight PLH seasons with Cracovia, Laszkiewicz played 368 regular season games. He scored 264 goals, with at least 23 goals each season, including a personal bests of 45 goals in the 2005–06 season and 80 points in the 2011–12 season. Teammates with his brother Daniel, they won the national championship five times, including 2005–06, 2007–08, 2008–09, 2010–11, and 2012–13. Laszkiewicz also won two silver medals and one bronze medal for the PLH playoffs with Cracovia, and won eight PLH championships combined between Cracovia and Unia Oświęcim. Fellow PLH players voted Laszkiewicz the best player in the league in consecutive seasons from 2009–10 to 2011–2012, giving him three Hockey Eagle Awards.

When departing Cracovia in 2013, Laszkiewicz stated "I've already achieved almost everything with Cracovia, so now I need a change of scenery to gain motivation to continue working". Returning to KTH Krynica in the 2013–14 season, team management promised lucrative player contracts and named Laszkiewicz the team captain. Having played 19 games, scoring 21 goals and 36 points, he and other players terminated their contracts amid KTH Krynica's financial struggles.

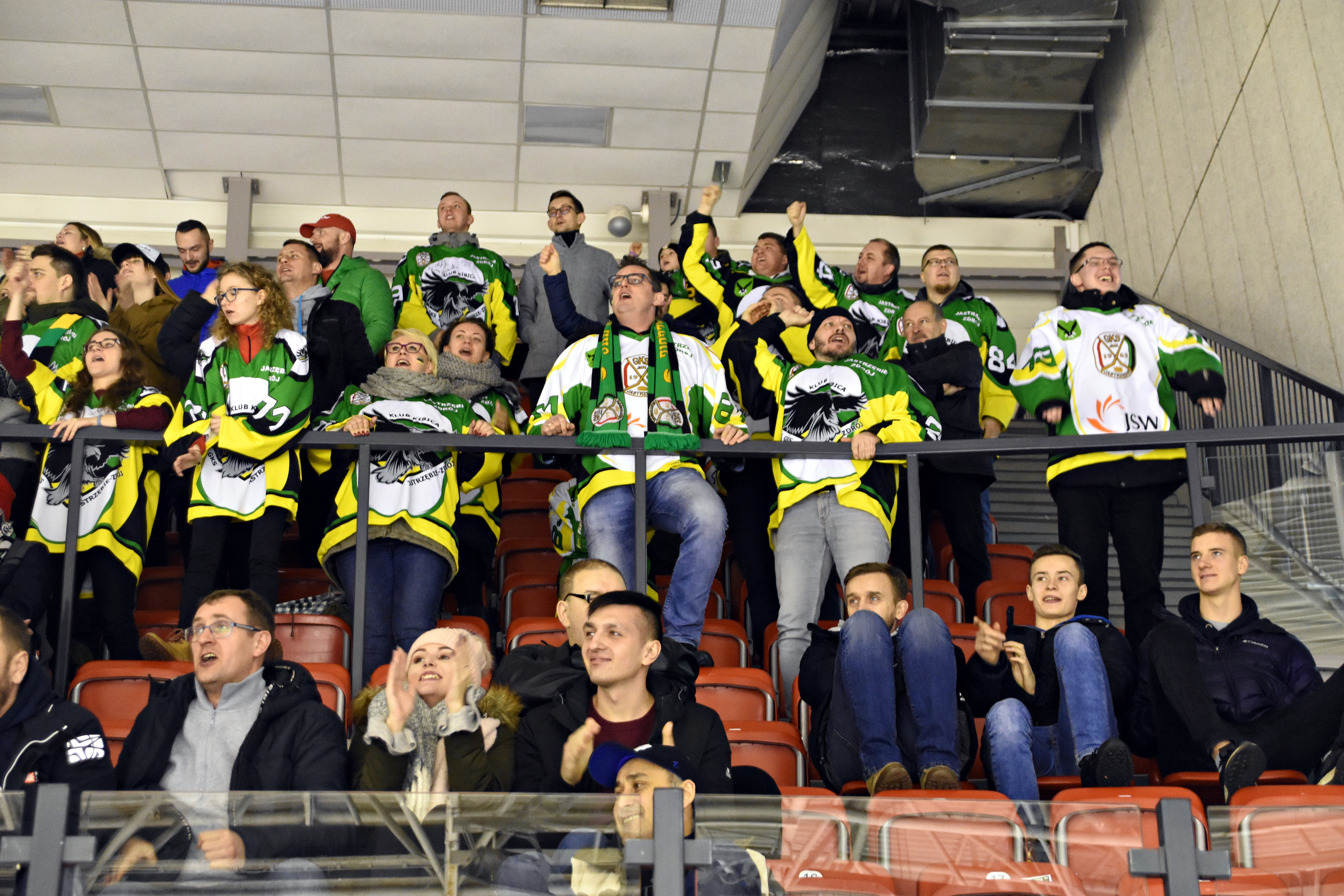
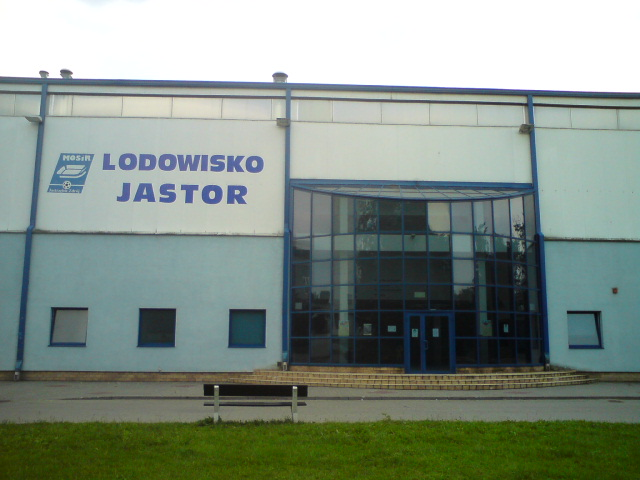
JKH GKS Jastrzębie's spectators and the team's home arena

When Laszkiewicz joined JKH GKS Jastrzębie in November 2013, he realized a childhood dream of playing professional hockey for his hometown team. He declined financially attractive offers from other PLH teams in wanting to return home. His team won the playoffs bronze medal in the 2013–14 season, and a silver medal in the 2014–15 season playoffs. He scored more than 20 goals in three of his final four PLH seasons, and scored his 1,000th career point in Polish hockey during the 2016–17 season–a total which included career regular season and playoffs scoring. He retired for health reasons after the 2017–18 season, when rehabilitation for back pain and sciatica was not effective. At his retirement, Laszkiewicz was the all-time PLH points-scoring leader.

=== International ===
Laszkiewicz played for the Poland under-18 team at the European Junior Championships in 1995 in Slovakia, and in 1996 in Poland. He was the leading scorer in Group B hosted in Sosnowiec and Tychy in 1996. With nine goals and 13 points, he was named to the event's all-star team. Playing for the Poland junior team at the 1997 World Junior Championships in Switzerland, it was his only top-tier appearance at the World Juniors and Poland's last. Next season, he played for Poland when hosting Group B of the 1998 World Junior Championships in Sosnowiec and Tychy. The Poland juniors placed third of eight teams.

Four months later, Laszkiewicz debuted with the Polish men's national team at the 1998 World Championships in Slovenia, and played on a forward line with Mariusz Czerkawski and Jacek Płachta. Playing at the 2001 World Championships in France under coach Wiktor Pysz, Laszkiewicz helped Poland earn promotion from Division I for the first time in ten years. Playing in the top tier at the 2002 World Championship in Sweden, Poland placed 14th and was relegated back to Division I.

Poland hosted multiple Ice Hockey World Championships while Laszkiewicz played for the men's national team. Poland placed fourth hosting in 2000 in Katowice and Kraków, and placed third in 2004 World Championships in Gdańsk. Hosting in 2009 in Toruń, Poland placed fourth; and at Krynica-Zdrój in 2012, Poland placed second. Hosting 2006 Winter Olympics qualification in Nowy Targ, Poland placed first in Group E but not advance beyond the next round. Four years later, Poland hosted 2010 Winter Olympics qualification in Sanok, placed second and did not advance.

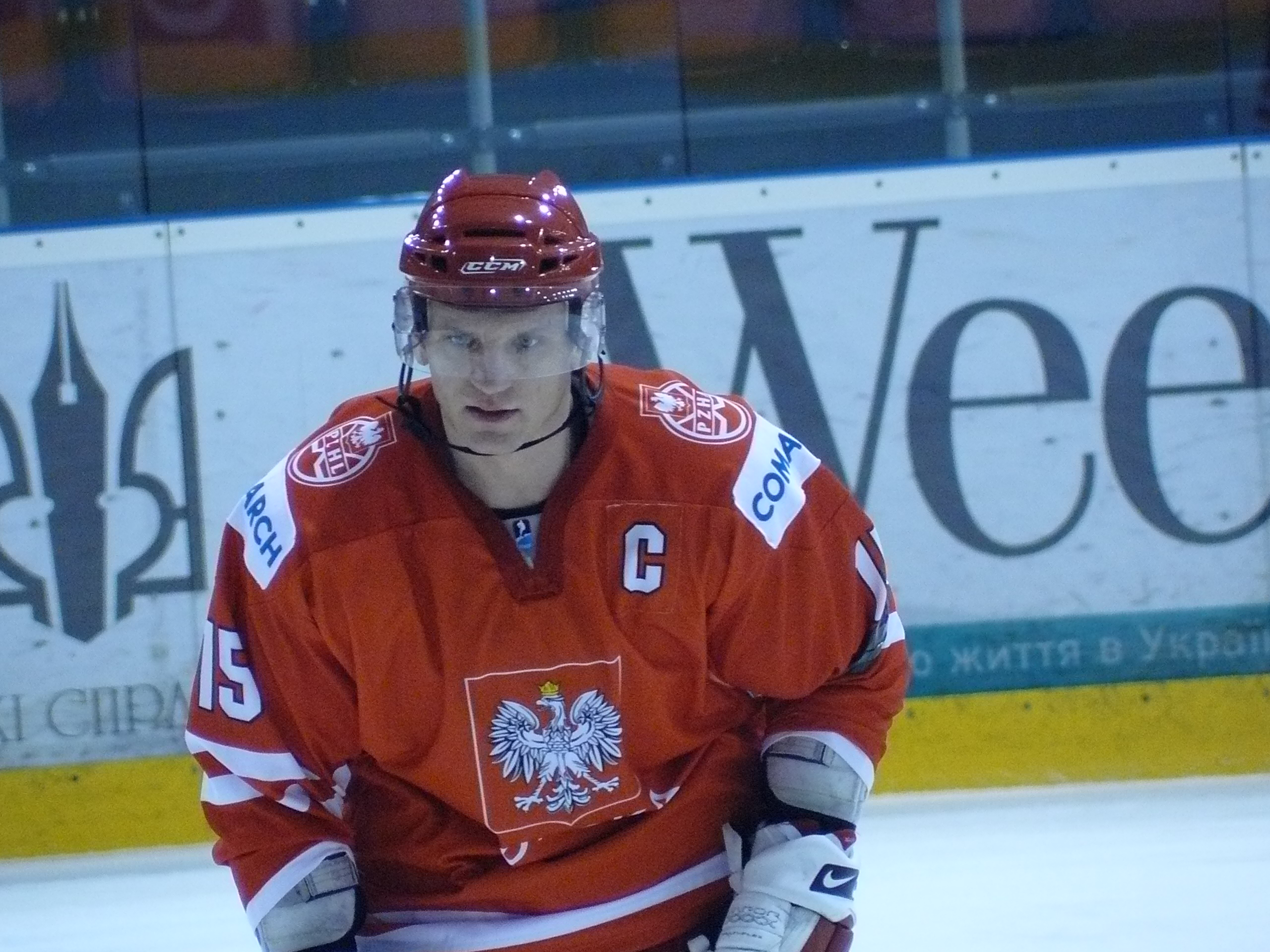
Laszkiewicz at the 2010 World Championships

Laszkiewicz was the Poland men's national team captain from 2008 to 2011. Scoring four goals and three assists in five games played at the 2014 World Championship, he placed third in individual scoring. In the following year, the 2015 tournament in Kraków was his eighteenth and final World Championship. Playing Hungary in the final game, Poland lost by a 1-2 score and placed third. In the final game, Laszkiewicz was chosen player-of-the-game by his teammates.

Playing 216 games for the Polish national team, Laszkiewicz scored 89 goals and 150 points. Competing at eighteen consecutive World Championships from 1998 until 2015, was tied for third most in International Ice Hockey Federation (IIHF) history when he retired. The 96 games he played at the World Championship is the second-most for Poland behind Henryk Gruth. In 2015, Laszkiewicz recalled his greatest memories with the Polish national team were playing his first World Championship in 1998, qualifying in 2001 for promotion to the top tier, then playing in the top tier in 2002.

== Executive career ==
Laszkiewicz became the Poland men's national team general manager in 2019. In his first World Championship as manager, Poland placed second in 2019, missing promotion from Division I to the top tier when losing their final game in overtime to Romania. Scheduled to host Group B of the 2020 World Championship in Katowice, the tournament was postponed to 2021 then cancelled due to the COVID-19 pandemic. Hosting the 2022 tournament in Katowice, Poland placed first in Group B and promoted to Division I A. Placing second in 2023 earned Poland promotion to the top division in 2024, their first appearance in the top division since 2002 when Laszkiewicz played. With an eighth-place finish at the 2024 World Championship, Poland was relegated back to Division I A. Placing fifth in 2025, Poland remained in Division I A.

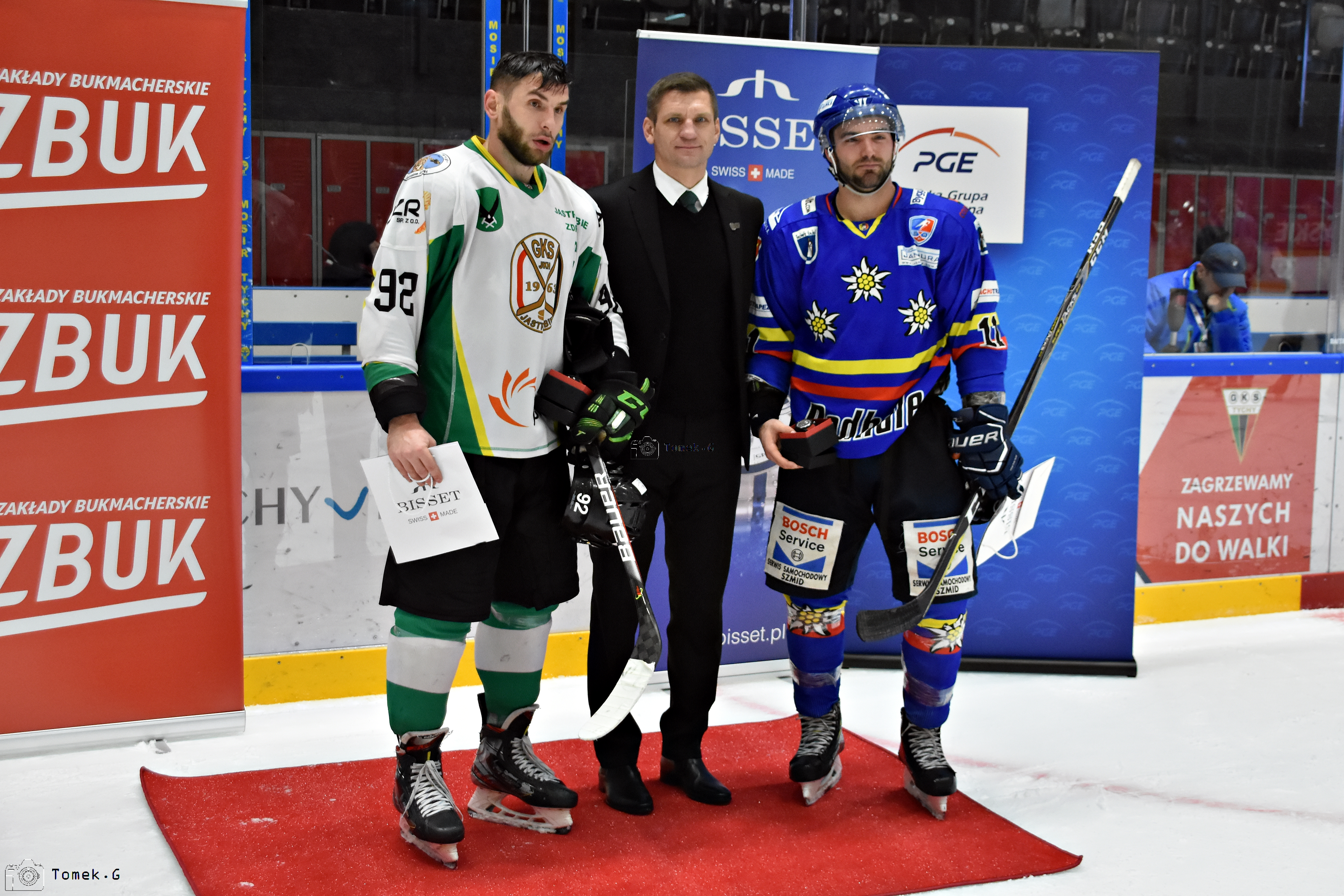
Laszkiewicz (center) following a JKH GKS Jastrzebie game in 2019

Laszkiewicz has also been general manager of JKH GKS Jastrzebie since the 2018–19 season. Jastrzebie won the Polish Cup versus Podhale Nowy Targ in his first season, and placed fourth of 11 teams. Repeating as Polish Cup champions versus TH Unia Oświęcim in the 2019–20 season, Jastrzebie placed fourth and won the first round of playoffs, when the national COVID-19 pandemic response canceled remaining playoff rounds. Jastrzebie placed second of 10 teams and won three championships in his third year as general manager. Jastrzebie won the PHL super cup versus GKS Tychy to begin the 2020–21 season, won the Polish Cup versus TH Unia Oświęcim, and won the PLH playoffs gold medal. Jastrzebie placed third in the 2021–22 season, and won the bronze medal in the playoffs. Following a fifth-place finish in the 2022–23 season, Jastrzebie placed fourth in the 2023–24 season and lost in the Polish Cup final versus GKS Tychy. In the 2024–25 season, Jastrzebie won the playoffs bronze medal and were again finalists in the Polish Cup final versus GKS Tychy.

== Honors and awards ==
Known by the nickname "Laszka" throughout his career, Laszkiewicz was given an honorary citizenship of Jastrzębie-Zdrój in 2019. He received the Torriani Award from the IIHF in 2025, in recognition of an outstanding international career from a country not among the world's top tier teams. The ceremony took place during the 2025 World Championship in Sweden, making him the second Polish player inducted into the IIHF Hall of Fame, following Henryk Gruth.

== Career statistics ==
=== Regular season and playoffs ===
			Regular season					Playoffs
Season	Team	League	GP	G	A	Pts	PIM	GP	G	A	Pts	PIM
1996–97	KH Zagłębie Sosnowiec	PLH	—	—	—	—	—	—	—	—	—	—
1996–97	SMS PZHL Sosnowiec	EEHL	20	10	6	16	12	—	—	—	—	—
1997–98	Nürnberg Ice Tigers	DEL	34	4	4	8	39	10	0	0	0	25
1998–99	Nürnberg Ice Tigers	DEL	21	1	2	3	12	10	0	0	0	0
1999–2000	KTH Krynica	PLH	—	10	15	25	12	—	—	—	—	—
2000–01	Unia Oświęcim	PLH	39	20	13	33	54	10	6	6	12	2
2001–02	Unia Oświęcim	PLH	46	21	24	45	18	—	—	—	—	—
2002–03	HC Vítkovice Steel	CZE	43	8	2	10	18	—	—	—	—	—
2002–03	HC Havířov	CZE	8	0	1	1	2	6	0	0	0	0
2003–04	Unia Oświęcim	PLH	28	21	21	42	6	11	3	2	5	4
2004–05	Milano Vipers	Serie A	32	19	9	28	10	13	3	2	5	10
2005–06	Cracovia	PLH	53	45	31	76	16	—	—	—	—	—
2006–07	Cracovia	PLH	48	35	33	68	38	—	—	—	—	—
2007–08	Cracovia	PLH	60	26	42	68	26	—	—	—	—	—
2008–09	Cracovia	PLH	41	26	29	55	60	—	—	—	—	—
2009–10	Cracovia	PLH	53	36	39	75	14	—	—	—	—	—
2010–11	Cracovia	PLH	34	30	29	59	10	11	8	11	19	4
2011–12	Cracovia	PLH	41	43	37	80	16	9	4	7	11	2
2012–13	Cracovia	PLH	38	23	24	48	14	16	8	12	20	10
2013–14	KTH Krynica	PLH	19	21	15	36	14	—	—	—	—	—
2013–14	JKH GKS Jastrzębie	PLH	5	3	6	9	0	—	—	—	—	—
2014–15	JKH GKS Jastrzębie	PLH	45	23	36	59	20	12	2	6	8	4
2015–16	JKH GKS Jastrzębie	PLH	41	23	29	52	8	3	1	0	1	2
2016–17	JKH GKS Jastrzębie	PLH	38	16	23	39	16	5	1	4	5	4
2017–18	JKH GKS Jastrzębie	PLH	37	25	23	48	18	7	3	3	6	8
PLH totals			675	451	480	931	362	95	42	62	104	50
EEHL totals			20	10	6	16	12	—	—	—	—	—
DEL totals			55	5	6	11	51	2	0	0	0	25
CZE totals			51	8	3	11	20	6	0	0	0	0
Serie A totals			32	19	9	28	10	13	3	2	5	10

=== International ===
Year	Team	Event	GP	G	A	Pts	PIM
1995	Poland under-18	European Junior Championships Group B	5	2	2	4	0
1996	Poland under-18	European Junior Championships Group B	6	9	4	13	0
1997	Poland under-20	World Junior Championship Group A	6	1	0	1	0
1998	Poland under-20	World Junior Championship Group B	8	2	9	11	0
1998	Poland men's	Ice Hockey World Championships Group B	7	3	5	8	4
1999	Poland men's	Ice Hockey World Championships Group B	7	1	0	1	2
2000	Poland men's	Ice Hockey World Championships Group B	7	0	0	0	0
2001	Poland men's	Ice Hockey World Championships Division I	5	3	2	5	0
2002	Poland men's	Ice Hockey World Championships	6	1	1	2	4
2003	Poland men's	Ice Hockey World Championships Division I	5	2	2	4	2
2004	Poland men's	Ice Hockey World Championships Division I	5	2	4	6	4
2004	Poland men's	2006 Winter Olympics qualification Group E	6	3	3	6	0
2005	Poland men's	Ice Hockey World Championships Division I	4	3	4	7	4
2006	Poland men's	Ice Hockey World Championships Division I	5	1	3	4	2
2007	Poland men's	Ice Hockey World Championships Division I	5	5	3	8	2
2008	Poland men's	Ice Hockey World Championships Division I	5	3	1	4	2
2008	Poland	2010 Winter Olympics qualification Group D	3	0	1	1	0
2009	Poland men's	Ice Hockey World Championships Division I	5	0	5	5	0
2010	Poland men's	Ice Hockey World Championships Division I	5	1	2	3	6
2011	Poland men's	Ice Hockey World Championships Division I	5	1	3	4	2
2012	Poland men's	Ice Hockey World Championships Division I B	5	4	5	9	2
2012	Poland men's	2014 Winter Olympics qualification Group H	3	2	1	3	0
2013	Poland men's	Ice Hockey World Championships Division I B	5	2	2	4	0
2014	Poland men's	Ice Hockey World Championships Division I B	5	4	3	7	4
2015	Poland men's	Ice Hockey World Championships Division I A	5	0	0	0	0
Poland under-18 and under-20 totals			25	14	15	29	0
Poland men's totals			108	41	50	91	40

- Sources: 1996:
