= Adam Borzęcki =

Polish-German ice hockey player

- Born: 6 May 1978 (age 47) Gdańsk, Poland
- Height: 6 ft 2 in (188 cm)
- Weight: 212 lb (96 kg; 15 st 2 lb)
- Position: Defense
- Shot: Left
- Played for: Stoczniowiec Gdańsk; KH Zagłębie Sosnowiec; Jackson Bandits; Idaho Steelheads; Chicago Wolves; Utah Grizzlies; Syracuse Crunch; Elmira Jackals; Hammarby Hockey; Manchester Monarchs; Reading Royals; Tölzer Löwen; SERC Wild Wings; Bietigheim Steelers
- National team: Poland
- NHL draft: Undrafted
- Playing career: 1993–2018

Adam Borzęcki (born 6 May 1978) is a Polish former ice hockey defenseman.

== Playing career ==
=== Beginning and junior ===
Adam started playing in his native Poland with his local team Stoczniowiec Gdańsk. He would also play for KH Zagłębie Sosnowiec until the conclusion of the 1996–97 season where he went over to North America to play 2 seasons with the Rimouski Océanic. He would not be selected in the NHL draft but would be signed by the Jackson Bandits of the ECHL.

=== North America ===
After a season in the ECHL. Adam would go on to play for 3 additional seasons in the minor leagues of North America for a total of 6 different franchises. During the 2003–04 season he would play one season in the second-tier HockeyAllsvenskan league in Sweden before returning to North America to play one additional season in the minors.

=== The German leagues ===
Concluding his stay in North America, would spend the rest of his days playing in the German hockey leagues for 3 different franchises. He retired in 2018.

== Personal life ==
Has a son, Jakub, who also plays hockey. He was born in Syracuse, New York in 2002.

== Career statistics ==
			Regular season					Playoffs
Season	Team	League	GP	G	A	Pts	PIM	GP	G	A	Pts	PIM
1993–94	Stoczniowiec Gdańsk	Poland	—	—	—	—	—	—	—	—	—	—
1994–95	MoDo Hockey J20	J20 SuperElit	3	0	0	0	2	—	—	—	—	—
1994–95	Stoczniowiec Gdansk	Poland	1	0	0	0	2	—	—	—	—	—
1995–96	Zaglebie Sosnowiec	Poland	28	0	1	1	39	—	—	—	—	—
1995–96	Stoczniowiec Gdansk	Poland	2	0	0	0	0	—	—	—	—	—
1996–97	Olimpia	EEHL	18	1	4	5	24	—	—	—	—	—
1997–98	Rimouski Oceanic	QMJHL	53	4	10	14	82	19	1	7	8	26
1998–99	Rimouski Oceanic	QMJHL	61	6	30	36	134	11	0	6	6	12
1999–00	Jackson Bandits	ECHL	65	7	21	28	153	—	—	—	—	—
2000–01	Idaho Steelheads	WCHL	28	1	12	13	60	9	0	1	1	26
2000–01	Chicago Wolves	IHL	9	0	0	0	10	—	—	—	—	—
2000–01	Utah Grizzlies	IHL	9	0	2	2	9	—	—	—	—	—
2000–01	Syracuse Crunch	AHL	29	1	6	7	39	5	0	1	1	8
2000–01	Stoczniowiec Gdansk	Poland	1	0	0	0	20	—	—	—	—	—
2001–02	Syracuse Crunch	AHL	70	2	6	8	111	10	1	0	1	10
2002–03	Elmira Jackals	UHL	8	0	2	2	20	—	—	—	—	—
2002–03	Syracuse Crunch	AHL	65	1	9	10	77	—	—	—	—	—
2003–04	Hammarby Hockey	Allsvenskan	29	1	7	8	42	7	0	1	1	32
2004–05	Manchester Monarchs	AHL	6	0	0	0	10	—	—	—	—	—
2004–05	Reading Royals	ECHL	61	5	9	14	102	7	0	2	2	10
2005–06	Tölzer Löwen	Germany2	48	5	17	22	150	—	—	—	—	—
2006–07	Tölzer Löwen	Germany3	48	13	45	58	143	11	1	6	7	41
2007–08	Tölzer Löwen	Germany3	51	9	45	54	168	8	0	4	4	8
2008–09	Tölzer Löwen	Germany2	46	12	18	30	104	—	—	—	—	—
2009–10	SERC Wild Wings	Germany2	51	4	19	23	95	13	0	6	6	14
2010–11	SERC Wild Wings	Germany2	47	4	13	17	94	11	1	6	7	18
2011–12	SERC Wild Wings	Germany2	38	3	19	22	58	11	0	3	3	14
2012–13	SERC Wild Wings	Germany2	47	3	12	15	165	16	0	4	4	30
2013–14	Schwenninger Wild Wings	DEL	50	1	6	7	92	—	—	—	—	—
2014–15	Bietigheim Steelers	DEL2	32	3	11	14	30	12	1	6	7	35
2015–16	Bietigheim Steelers	DEL2	50	2	14	16	83	14	3	5	8	16
2016–17	Bietigheim Steelers	DEL2	50	7	22	29	87	15	2	3	5	16
2017–18	Bietigheim Steelers	DEL2	46	0	10	10	32	16	0	4	4	16
AHL totals			170	4	21	25	237	15	1	1	2	18
