= Laszkiewicz =

Laszkiewicz is a surname of Polish language origin. It derivied from Łążek, a diminutive of Lazar, meaning "God has helped".

== List of people surnamed Laszkiewicz ==
- Daniel Laszkiewicz, (born 1976), Polish ice hockey player
- Leszek Laszkiewicz (born 1978), Polish ice hockey player and executive
