= 1988–89 Polska Liga Hokejowa season =

Polish ice hockey season

The 1988–89 Polska Liga Hokejowa season was the 54th season of the Polska Liga Hokejowa, the top level of ice hockey in Poland. 10 teams participated in the league, and Polonia Bytom won the championship.

== First round ==
	Club	GP	W	T	L	Goals	Pts
1.	Polonia Bytom	18	13	2	3	83:40	28
2.	Naprzód Janów	18	12	3	3	86:40	27
3.	GKS Tychy	18	12	1	5	83:70	25
4.	Podhale Nowy Targ	18	11	2	5	82:40	24
5.	GKS Katowice	18	8	2	8	73:80	18
6.	Zagłębie Sosnowiec	18	7	1	10	60:57	15
7.	KS Cracovia	18	7	1	10	46:62	15
8.	Towimor Torun	18	4	2	12	68:126	10
9.	Stoczniowiec Gdansk	18	4	2	12	49:74	10
10.	Unia Oświęcim	18	3	2	13	46:87	8

== Final round ==
	Club	GP	W	T	L	Goals	Pts
1.	Polonia Bytom	28	20	4	4	134:60	44
2.	Naprzód Janów	28	17	5	6	121:74	39
3.	Podhale Nowy Targ	28	17	3	8	124:72	37
4.	GKS Tychy	28	16	1	11	121:125	33
5.	GKS Katowice	28	11	3	15	107:113	25
6.	Zagłębie Sosnowiec	28	9	1	18	90:109	19

== Qualification round ==
	Club	GP	W	T	L	Goals	Pts
7.	KS Cracovia	30	14	2	14	102:95	30
8.	Stoczniowiec Gdansk	30	10	3	17	88:118	23
9.	Towimor Torun	30	10	2	18	121:178	22
10.	Unia Oświęcim	30	7	2	21	78:138	16

== Playoffs ==
=== Quarterfinals ===
- Polonia Bytom - Stoczniowiec Gdansk 2:0 (8:1, 16:2)
- Naprzód Janów - KS Cracovia 2:0 (4:3, 8:1)
- Podhale Nowy Targ - Zagłębie Sosnowiec 2:0 (2:1, 6:2)
- GKS Tychy - GKS Katowice 0:2 (3:5, 1:4)

=== Semifinals ===
- Polonia Bytom - GKS Katowice 2:0 (12:1, 6:4)
- Naprzód Janów - Podhale Nowy Targ 2:0 (3:2, 2:1)

=== Final ===
- Polonia Bytom - Naprzód Janów 2:1 (3:1, 2:4, 6:1)

== Placing round ==
=== 9th place ===
- Towimór Torun - Unia Oświęcim 2:0 (6:4, 4:3 SO)

=== 7th place ===
- KS Cracovia - Stoczniowiec Gdansk 2:0 (6:2, 6:2)

=== 5th place ===
- Zagłębie Sosnowiec - GKS Tychy 2:1 (5:3, 1:5, 5:2)

=== 3rd place ===
- Podhale Nowy Targ - GKS Katowice 2:1 (7:1, 1:6, 7:2)
