= 1987–88 Polska Liga Hokejowa season =

Polish ice hockey season

The 1987–88 Polska Liga Hokejowa season was the 53rd season of the Polska Liga Hokejowa, the top level of ice hockey in Poland. 10 teams participated in the league, and Polonia Bytom won the championship.

== Final round ==
| | Club | GP | W | T | L | Goals | Pts |
|---|---|---|---|---|---|---|---|
| 1. | Polonia Bytom | 28 | 23 | 5 | 0 | 168:66 | 51 |
| 2. | GKS Tychy | 28 | 17 | 2 | 9 | 161:108 | 36 |
| 3. | Naprzód Janów | 28 | 15 | 5 | 8 | 131:96 | 35 |
| 4. | Zagłębie Sosnowiec | 28 | 14 | 3 | 11 | 105:94 | 31 |
| 5. | Podhale Nowy Targ | 28 | 11 | 2 | 15 | 113:104 | 24 |
| 6. | Stoczniowiec Gdansk | 28 | 8 | 5 | 15 | 84:140 | 21 |

== Qualification round ==
| | Club | GP | W | T | L | Goals | Pts |
|---|---|---|---|---|---|---|---|
| 7. | GKS Katowice | 30 | 11 | 4 | 15 | 117:123 | 26 |
| 8. | Unia Oświęcim | 30 | 10 | 5 | 15 | 107:152 | 25 |
| 9. | ŁKS Łódź | 30 | 8 | 5 | 17 | 95:173 | 21 |
| 10. | KS Cracovia | 30 | 6 | 6 | 18 | 93:179 | 18 |

== Playoffs ==
=== Quarterfinals ===
- Polonia Bytom - Unia Oświęcim 2:0 (12:2, 7:2)
- Zagłębie Sosnowiec - Podhale Nowy Targ 2:0 (4:2, 4:3 n.P.)
- GKS Tychy - GKS Katowice 2:1 (4:0, 2:6, 6:1)
- Naprzód Janów - KS Cracovia 2:0 (4:3, 8:1)

=== Semifinals ===
- Polonia Bytom - Zagłębie Sosnowiec 2:1 (4:6, 5:2, 10:1)
- GKS Tychy - Naprzód Janów 2:1 (3:1, 5:6, 4:2)

=== Final ===
- Polonia Bytom - GKS Tychy 2:0 (5:2, 4:0)

== Placing round ==
=== 7th place ===
- Stoczniowiec Gdansk - Unia Oświęcim 1:2 (7:6, 5:7, 1:4)

=== 5th place ===
- Podhale Nowy Targ - GKS Katowice 2:0 (9:2, 6:2)

=== 3rd place ===
- Naprzód Janów - Zagłębie Sosnowiec 1:2 (3:2, 2:5, 2:3)

== Relegation ==
- ŁKS Łódź - KS Cracovia 0:4 (1:6, 1:9, 1:7, 1:4)
