= Victor Rollin Carlsson =

Swedish ice hockey player

- Born: August 14, 1989 (age 36) Uppsala, Sweden
- Height: 5 ft 9 in (175 cm)
- Weight: 174 lb (79 kg; 12 st 6 lb)
- Position: Centre
- Shot: Left
- Played for: Almtuna IS; Tierps HK; Tingsryds AIF; Brynäs IF; Herlev Eagles; SønderjyskE Ishockey; Unia Oswiecim; Aalborg Pirates
- NHL draft: Undrafted
- Playing career: 2007–2023

Victor Rollin Carlsson (born August 14, 1989) is a Swedish ice hockey player who plays with SønderjyskE Ishockey of the Metal Ligaen.

Rollin Carlsson made his Swedish Hockey League debut playing with Brynäs IF during the 2013–14 SHL season.

== Career statistics ==
			Regular season					Playoffs
Season	Team	League	GP	G	A	Pts	PIM	GP	G	A	Pts	PIM
2005–06	Almtuna IS J18	J18 Elit	—	12	7	19	47	—	—	—	—	—
2005–06	Almtuna IS J20	J20 SuperElit	23	4	4	8	32	—	—	—	—	—
2006–07	Almtuna IS J18	J18 Elit	—	2	6	8	0	—	—	—	—	—
2006–07	Almtuna IS J20	J20 SuperElit	38	9	12	21	106	—	—	—	—	—
2006–07	Almtuna IS	HockeyAllsvenskan	2	0	0	0	0	—	—	—	—	—
2006–07	Tierps HK	Division 1	2	0	0	0	0	—	—	—	—	—
2007–08	Almtuna IS J20	J20 Elit	—	1	2	3	2	—	—	—	—	—
2007–08	Almtuna IS	HockeyAllsvenskan	43	1	5	6	20	—	—	—	—	—
2008–09	Almtuna IS J20	J20 Elit	—	—	—	—	—	—	—	—	—	—
2008–09	Almtuna IS	HockeyAllsvenskan	41	4	6	10	30	—	—	—	—	—
2009–10	Tingsryds AIF	Division 1	40	1	16	17	14	10	4	3	7	4
2010–11	Tingsryds AIF	HockeyAllsvenskan	52	3	1	4	10	10	2	3	5	2
2011–12	Tingsryds AIF	HockeyAllsvenskan	48	6	13	19	26	—	—	—	—	—
2012–13	Almtuna IS	HockeyAllsvenskan	48	10	3	13	34	—	—	—	—	—
2013–14	Almtuna IS J20	J20 Elit	1	2	3	5	2	—	—	—	—	—
2013–14	Almtuna IS	HockeyAllsvenskan	27	4	10	14	14	—	—	—	—	—
2013–14	Brynäs IF	SHL	5	0	0	0	0	5	0	0	0	0
2014–15	Almtuna IS	HockeyAllsvenskan	45	12	19	31	48	—	—	—	—	—
2015–16	Almtuna IS	HockeyAllsvenskan	31	6	12	18	16	4	1	1	2	2
2016–17	Almtuna IS	HockeyAllsvenskan	46	5	12	17	16	5	0	0	0	8
2017–18	Almtuna IS	HockeyAllsvenskan	51	15	19	34	44	5	1	0	1	10
2018–19	Almtuna IS	HockeyAllsvenskan	41	8	10	18	16	—	—	—	—	—
2019–20	Herlev Eagles	Denmark	47	25	35	60	30	—	—	—	—	—
2020–21	SønderjyskE Ishockey	Denmark	24	10	9	19	20	9	4	3	7	12
2021–22	TH Unia Oświęcim	Poland	33	12	22	34	16	14	6	11	17	8
2022–23	Aalborg Pirates	Denmark	48	15	23	37	12	16	4	4	8	12
SHL totals			5	0	0	0	0	5	0	0	0	0
HockeyAllsvenskan totals			475	74	110	184	274	30	6	6	12	30
Denmark totals			119	50	67	117	62	25	8	7	15	24
