= Jerzy Mruk =

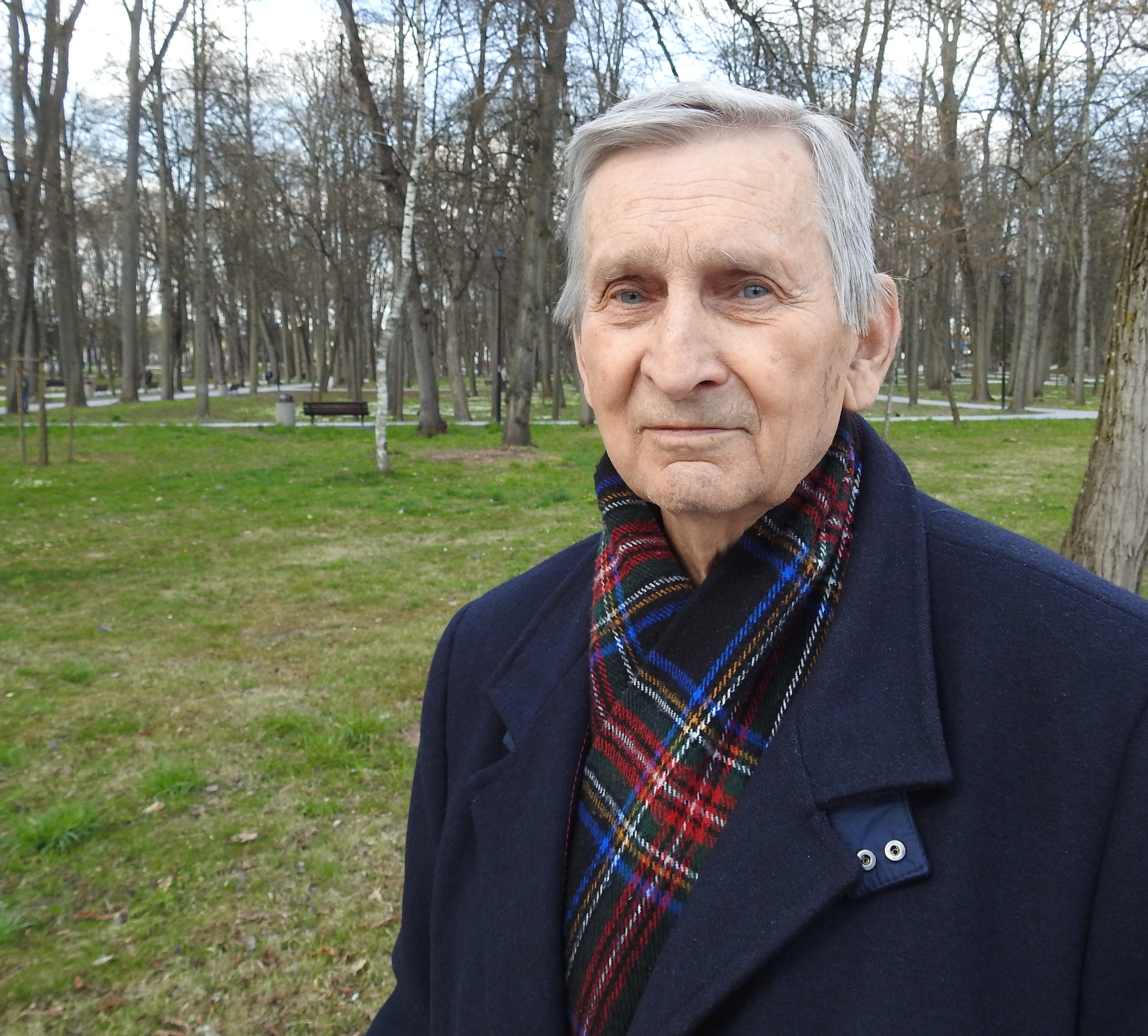
- Born: 17 February 1938
- Died: 29 October 2023 (aged 85)
- Position: Goaltender
- Played for: KTH Krynica (1953–1956); Cracovia (1956–1964); ŁKS Łódź (1964–1970)
- Coached for: ŁKS Łódź; Unia Oświęcim; GKS Katowice; Zagłębie Sosnowiec; SMS PZHL Sosnowiec; Poland
- National team: Poland
- Playing career: 1953–1970

Jerzy Mruk (17 February 1938 – 29 October 2023) was a Polish ice hockey goaltender and manager, widely credited with popularising the sport in his native country.

Mruk coached the Poland national team a record 161 times including (alongside Leszek Lejczyk) at the Winter Olympics in Calgary in 1988 and Albertville in 1992.

After his coaching career he went on to work on behalf of the PZHL. He was also one of the initiators of the play-off system in the PLH.

Mruk died on 29 October 2023, at the age of 85.
