= 1983–84 Polska Liga Hokejowa season =

Polish ice hockey season

The 1983–84 Polska Liga Hokejowa season was the 49th season of the Polska Liga Hokejowa, the top level of ice hockey in Poland. 10 teams participated in the league, and Polonia Bytom won the championship.

== Final round ==
	Club	GP	W	T	L	Goals	Pts
1.	Polonia Bytom	28	22	3	3	140:60	47
2.	Zagłębie Sosnowiec	28	17	5	6	174:76	39
3.	Podhale Nowy Targ	28	18	1	9	115:81	37
4.	Naprzód Janów	28	10	7	11	113:114	27
5.	GKS Tychy	28	13	1	14	109:117	27
6.	ŁKS Łódź	28	9	3	16	91:122	21

== Qualification round ==
	Club	GP	W	T	L	Goals	Pts
7.	GKS Katowice	30	13	1	16	123:151	27
8.	Unia Oświęcim	30	12	2	16	143:153	26
9.	KS Cracovia	30	10	4	16	128:157	24
10.	BKS Bydgoszcz	30	5	3	22	93:198	13

== Playoffs ==
=== Quarterfinals ===
- Polonia Bytom - Unia Oświęcim 2:0 (11:0, 6:1)
- Naprzód Janów - GKS Tychy 1:2 (5:1, 2:5, 3:4)
- Zagłębie Sosnowiec - GKS Katowice 2:0 (6:1, 4:3)
- Podhale Nowy Targ - ŁKS Łódź 2:1 (14:2, 0:3, 16:2)

=== Semifinals ===
- Polonia Bytom - GKS Tychy 2:0 (9:2, 7:1)
- Zagłębie Sosnowiec - Podhale Nowy Targ 2:1 (4:8, 7:3, 5:4)

=== Final ===
- Polonia Bytom - Zagłębie Sosnowiec 2:1 (2:1, 2:3, 7:0)

== Placing round ==
=== 7th place ===
- ŁKS Łódź - Unia Oświęcim 2:1 (2:6, 7:3, 7:1)

=== 5th place ===
- Naprzód Janów - GKS Katowice 2:1 (9:6, 4:6, 5:2)

=== 3rd place ===
- Podhale Nowy Targ - GKS Tychy 2:0 (5:0, 4:2)

== Relegation ==
- KS Cracovia - BTH Bydgoszcz 2:0 (5:4, 10:4)
