= Marcin Kolusz =

Polish ice hockey player (born 1985)

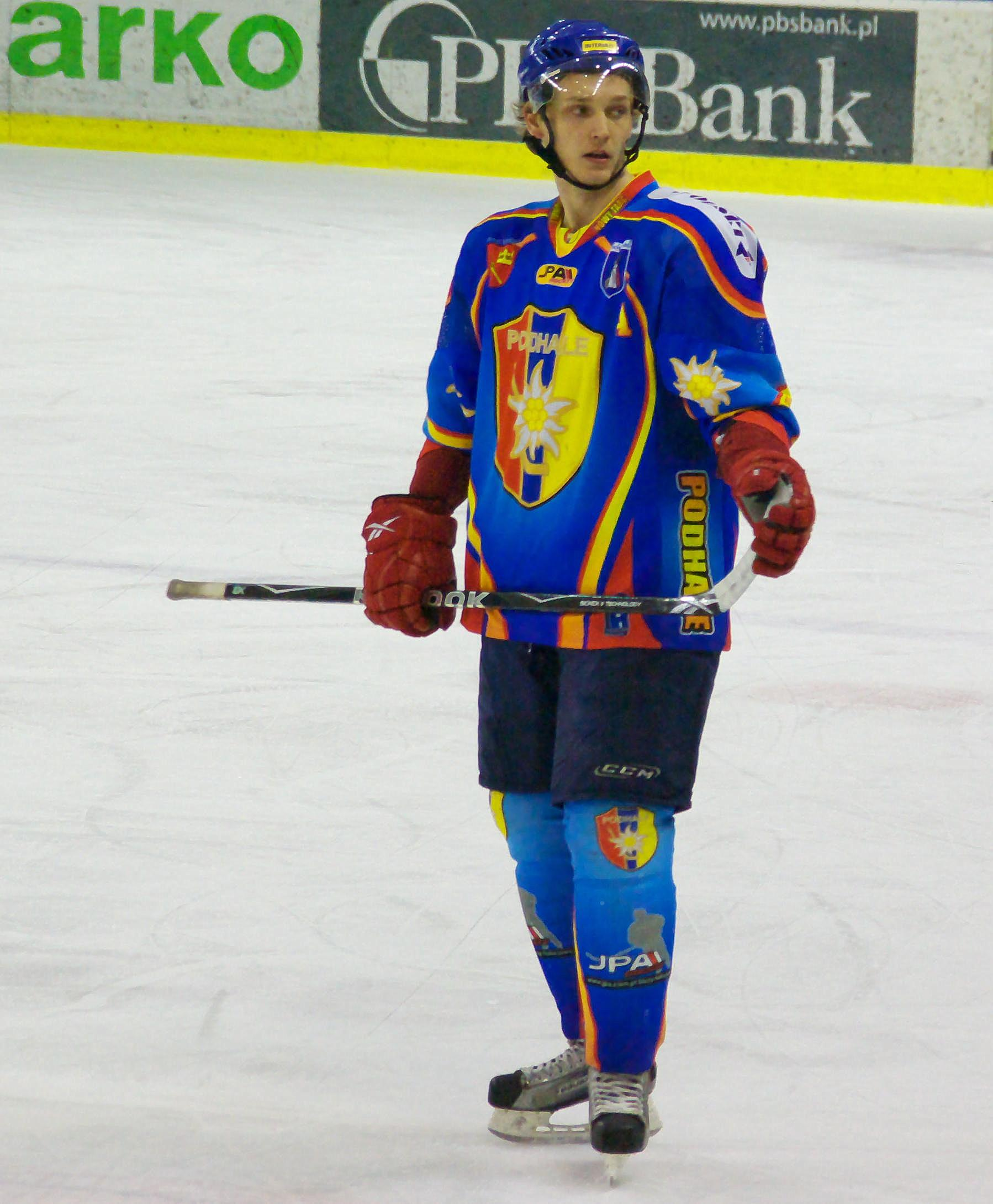
- Born: 18 January 1985 (age 41) Limanowa, Poland
- Height: 6 ft 1 in (185 cm)
- Weight: 181 lb (82 kg; 12 st 13 lb)
- Position: Centre
- Shot: Left
- PHL team Former teams: Podhale Nowy Targ; Vancouver Giants; HC Oceláři Třinec; HC Havířov; LHK Jestřábi Prostějov; HK Poprad; KH Sanok; KTH Krynica; GKS Tychy; HC GKS Katowice; Vaasan Sport; HK Dukla Michalovce
- National team: Poland
- NHL draft: 157th overall, 2003; Minnesota Wild
- Playing career: 2000–2025

Marcin Kolusz (born 18 January 1985) is a Polish ice hockey player. He plays for Podhale Nowy Targ of the Polska Hokej Liga.

== Career ==
Kolusz played junior hockey with Podhale Nowy Targ, and was selected by the Minnesota Wild in the 5th round (157th overall) in the 2003 NHL entry draft. He then spent one year in North America with the Vancouver Giants of the Western Hockey League, before returning to Europe, spending several years with teams in both the Czech Republic and Slovakia. Kolusz returned to Poland in 2009, and has played in the PHL since then. He has also played internationally for the Polish national team in several tournaments.

== Career statistics ==
=== Regular season and playoffs ===
			Regular season					Playoffs
Season	Team	League	GP	G	A	Pts	PIM	GP	G	A	Pts	PIM
2000–01	Podhale Nowy Targ	PHL	5	0	0	0	2	—	—	—	—	—
2002–03	Podhale Nowy Targ	PHL	30	2	4	6	10	—	—	—	—	—
2003–04	Vancouver Giants	WHL	64	6	12	18	19	6	1	0	1	0
2004–05	Podhale Nowy Targ	PHL	26	5	9	14	12	—	—	—	—	—
2005–06	HC Oceláři Třinec	ELH	2	1	0	1	0	—	—	—	—	—
2005–06	HC Havířov Panthers	CZE.2	5	0	0	0	4	—	—	—	—	—
2005–06	HK Jestřábi Prostějov	CZE.2	10	1	1	2	4	—	—	—	—	—
2006–07	HC Oceláři Třinec	ELH	43	5	1	6	6	10	2	2	4	6
2007–08	HC Oceláři Třinec	ELH	43	1	1	2	8	6	0	0	0	0
2008–09	HK Aquacity ŠKP Poprad	SVK	53	1	13	14	42	—	—	—	—	—
2009–10	Podhale Nowy Targ	PHL	47	20	29	49	36	—	—	—	—	—
2010–11	Podhale Nowy Targ	PHL	24	7	14	21	14	11	3	7	10	2
2011–12	KH Sanok	PHL	41	22	23	45	8	9	5	3	8	4
2012–13	KH Sanok	PHL	37	13	24	37	4	10	3	6	9	4
2013–14	KTH Krynica	PHL	19	8	19	27	4	—	—	—	—	—
2013–14	GKS Tychy	PHL	24	10	19	29	6	15	5	3	8	2
2014–15	GKS Tychy	PHL	42	16	24	40	10	11	2	3	5	0
2015–16	GKS Tychy	PHL	41	14	25	39	6	14	2	9	11	4
2016–17	GKS Tychy	PHL	32	9	13	22	6	15	1	10	11	8
2017–18	Podhale Nowy Targ	PHL	38	11	20	31	8	14	1	8	9	4
2018–19	Podhale Nowy Targ	PHL	22	3	13	16	10	16	3	7	10	2
2019–20	GKS Katowice	PHL	44	8	21	29	10	6	1	4	5	0
2020–21	Sport	Liiga	9	0	2	2	0	—	—	—	—	—
2020–21	HK Dukla Ingema Michalovce	SVK	14	0	3	3	0	3	0	1	1	0
2021–22	Podhale Nowy Targ	PHL	27	7	8	15	8	—	—	—	—	—
2021–22	GKS Katowice	PHL	11	4	7	11	8	16	2	9	11	2
POL totals			511	159	272	431	162	137	28	69	97	32
ELH totals			88	7	2	9	14	16	2	2	4	6
Slovak totals			67	1	16	17	42	3	0	1	1	0

=== International ===
Year	Team	Event	GP	G	A	Pts	PIM
2001	Poland	WJC18 D2	4	0	0	0	0
2002	Poland	WJC18 D2	5	6	8	14	16
2003	Poland	WJC D1	5	2	1	3	6
2003	Poland	WJC18 D1	5	4	3	7	0
2004	Poland	WJC D2	5	8	10	18	4
2005	Poland	WJC D1	5	2	1	3	10
2006	Poland	WC D1	5	2	5	7	4
2007	Poland	WC D1	5	0	2	2	6
2008	Poland	WC D1	5	2	1	3	0
2008	Poland	OGQ	3	1	0	1	0
2009	Poland	WC D1	5	4	0	4	6
2010	Poland	WC D1	5	0	1	1	2
2011	Poland	WC D1	5	2	4	6	4
2012	Poland	WC D1B	5	4	6	10	0
2012	Poland	OGQ	3	1	0	1	2
2013	Poland	WC D1B	5	1	7	8	2
2014	Poland	WC D1B	5	3	2	5	0
2015	Poland	WC D1A	5	2	3	5	0
2016	Poland	OGQ	3	1	1	2	0
2016	Poland	WC D1A	5	0	2	2	2
2016	Poland	OGQ	3	0	0	0	0
2017	Poland	WC D1A	5	0	0	0	0
2018	Poland	WC D1A	5	1	1	2	2
2019	Poland	WC D1B	5	0	6	6	0
2020	Poland	OGQ	3	1	2	3	0
2021	Poland	OGQ	3	0	1	1	0
2023	Poland	WC D1A	5	1	3	4	0
2024	Poland	OGQ	3	1	2	3	0
2024	Poland	WC	6	0	1	1	0
Junior totals			29	22	23	45	36
Senior totals			102	27	50	77	30
