= Józef Kurek =

Polish ice hockey player and coach

- Born: January 2, 1933; Krynica, Poland
- Died: February 18, 2015 (aged 82); Krynica-Zdrój, Poland
- Height: 6 ft 0 in (183 cm)
- Weight: 165 lb (75 kg; 11 st 11 lb)
- Position: Right wing
- Played for: KTH Krynica; OWKS Bydgoszcz; Legia Warsaw
- National team: Poland
- Playing career: 1951–1968

Józef Franciszek Kurek (2 January 1933 — 18 February 2015) was a Polish ice hockey player. He played for KTH Krynica, OWKS Bydgoszcz, and Legia Warsaw during his career. He also played for the Polish national team at several world championships as well as the 1956 and 1964 Winter Olympics. He won the Polish hockey league championship eight times in his career, once with Krynica in 1950 and seven times with Legia. After his playing career Kurek turned to coaching, and served as the coach of the Polish national team in the 1970s, most notably during the 1976 World Championship when Poland upset the Soviet Union 6–4, considered one of the greatest upsets in hockey history. He was awarded the Silver Cross of Merit for his services.
