= 2003–04 Polska Liga Hokejowa season =

Polish ice hockey season

The 2003–04 Polska Liga Hokejowa season was the 69th season of the Polska Liga Hokejowa, the top level of ice hockey in Poland. Eight teams participated in the league, and Unia Oswiecim won the championship.

== Regular season ==
	Club	GP	W	OTW	T	OTL	L	Goals	Pts
1.	Unia Oświęcim	28	24	1	1	0	2	182:63	75
2.	Podhale Nowy Targ	28	22	0	1	0	5	154:57	67
3.	Stoczniowiec Gdansk	28	19	0	1	1	7	133:59	59
4.	GKS Tychy	28	17	0	1	1	9	143:84	53
5.	THK Torun	28	11	1	0	0	16	108:116	35
6.	KH Opole	28	10	0	0	0	18	85:119	30
7.	GKS Katowice	28	4	0	0	1	23	80:181	13
8.	KTH Krynica	28	0	1	0	0	27	49:261	2

== Playoffs ==
Semi-finals
Unia Oświęcim	3
GKS Tychy	2
Podhale Nowy Targ	3
Stoczniowiec Gdansk	0

Final
Unia Oświęcim	4
Podhole Nowy Targ	2
Third place
Stoczniowiec Gdansk	0
GKS Tychy	3
