= 1990–91 Polska Liga Hokejowa season =

Polish ice hockey season

The 1990–91 Polska Liga Hokejowa season was the 56th season of the Polska Liga Hokejowa, the top level of ice hockey in Poland. 10 teams participated in the league, and Polonia Bytom won the championship.

== First round ==
	Club	GP	W	T	L	Goals	Pts
1.	Polonia Bytom	18	16	0	2	79:38	32
2.	Unia Oświęcim	18	11	2	5	78:52	24
3.	Towimor Torun	18	11	0	7	67:64	22
4.	Naprzód Janów	18	9	2	7	71:74	20
5.	KS Cracovia	18	8	4	6	78:66	20
6.	Podhale Nowy Targ	18	10	0	8	88:57	20
7.	GKS Tychy	18	8	1	9	77:74	17
8.	GKS Katowice	18	6	4	8	84:76	16
9.	Zagłębie Sosnowiec	18	3	3	12	71:92	9
10.	ŁKS Łódź	18	0	0	18	39:139	0

== Final round ==
	Club	GP	W	T	L	Goals	Pts
1.	Polonia Bytom	28	24	1	3	118:65	49
2.	Unia Oświęcim	28	16	2	10	119:82	34
3.	Podhale Nowy Targ	28	15	2	11	125:88	32
4.	Naprzód Janów	28	13	3	12	97:111	29
5.	KS Cracovia	28	11	6	11	110:107	28
6.	Towimor Torun	28	12	2	14	99:105	26

== Qualification round ==
	Club	GP	W	T	L	Goals	Pts
7.	GKS Katowice	24	10	4	10	125:107	24
8.	GKS Tychy	24	9	1	14	103:117	19
9.	Zagłębie Sosnowiec	24	6	3	15	102:115	15
10.	ŁKS Łódź	24	4	0	20	67:168	8

== Playoffs ==
=== Quarterfinals ===
- Polonia Bytom - GKS Tychy 2:0 (5:2, 11:2)
- Naprzód Janów - KS Cracovia 2:0 (6:3, 4:2)
- Unia Oświęcim - GKS Katowice 2:0 (5:3, 4:1)
- Podhale Nowy Targ - Towimor Torun 2:1 (8:2, 4:5 SO, 7:0)

=== Semifinals ===
- Polonia Bytom - Naprzód Janów 2:0 (6:3, 6:0)
- Unia Oświęcim - Podhale Nowy Targ 2:1 (4:0, 2:4, 6:4)

=== Final ===
- Polonia Bytom - Unia Oświęcim 2:0 (5:2, 3:2)

== Placing round ==
=== 7th place ===
- GKS Tychy - GKS Katowice 2:0 (6:4, 7:3)

=== 5th place ===
- Towimor Torun - KS Cracovia 2:0 (4:3 SO, 3:1)

=== 3rd place ===
- Podhale Nowy Targ - Naprzód Janów 2:0 (5:1, 5:3)

== Relegation ==
- Zagłębie Sosnowiec - ŁKS Łódź 2:1 (5:2, 2:8, 10:7)
