= 2021–22 Polska Hokej Liga season =

- League: Polska Hokej Liga
- Sport: Ice hockey
- Duration: September 10, 2021 – April 8, 2022
- Number of teams: 9

Regular season
- Regular-season winner: GKS Katowice
- Runners-up: Unia Oświęcim

Playoffs

Finals
- Champions: GKS Katowice (7th title)
- Runners-up: Unia Oświęcim

Polska Liga Hokejowa seasons
- ← 2020–21 2022–23 →

The 2021–22 Polska Hokej Liga season was the 87th season of the Polska Hokej Liga, the top level of ice hockey in Poland. Nine teams participated in the league.

== Teams ==
Teams of the 2021–22 PHL season.
Location of teams in the Katowice urban area

| Team | City | Arena | Capacity | Founded |
|---|---|---|---|---|
| Comarch Cracovia | Kraków | Lodowisko im. Adama "Rocha" Kowalskiego | 2,514 | 1923 |
| Energa Toruń | Toruń | Tor-Tor | 4,500 | 1922 (Original) 2010 (Current) |
| GKS Katowice | Katowice | Lodowisko Spodek Satelita | 1,500 | 1964 |
| GKS Tychy | Tychy | Stadion Zimowy w Tychach | 2,535 | 1971 |
| JKH GKS Jastrzębie | Jastrzębie-Zdrój | Jastor | 1,986 | 1963 |
| Podhale Nowy Targ | Nowy Targ | Miejska Hala Lodowa | 3,500 | 1932 (Original) 2015 (Current) |
| STS Sanok | Sanok | Arena Sanok | 3,000 | 1958 (Original) 2020 (Current) |
| Unia Oświęcim | Oświęcim | Hala Lodowa MOSiR | 2,686 | 1958 |
| Zagłębie Sosnowiec | Sosnowiec | Stadion Zimowy | 2,125 | 1933 (Original) 1998 (Current) |

== Regular season ==
| Pos | Team | Pld | W | OTW | OTL | L | GF | GA | GD | Pts | Qualification |
|---|---|---|---|---|---|---|---|---|---|---|---|
| 1 | GKS Katowice | 40 | 27 | 1 | 0 | 12 | 142 | 85 | +57 | 83 | Qualification to play-offs |
| 2 | Unia Oświęcim | 40 | 25 | 2 | 1 | 12 | 150 | 112 | +38 | 80 | Qualification to play-offs |
| 3 | GKS Jastrzębie | 40 | 25 | 1 | 1 | 13 | 137 | 101 | +36 | 78 | Qualification to play-offs |
| 4 | KS Cracovia | 40 | 23 | 2 | 1 | 14 | 140 | 112 | +28 | 74 | Qualification to play-offs |
| 5 | GKS Tychy | 40 | 22 | 1 | 2 | 15 | 132 | 103 | +29 | 70 | Qualification to play-offs |
| 6 | TKH Toruń | 40 | 18 | 2 | 2 | 18 | 117 | 115 | +2 | 60 | Qualification to play-offs |
| 7 | STS Sanok | 40 | 15 | 1 | 2 | 22 | 116 | 140 | −24 | 49 | Qualification to play-offs |
| 8 | KH Zagłębie Sosnowiec | 40 | 10 | 1 | 3 | 26 | 107 | 156 | −49 | 35 | Qualification to play-offs |
| 9 | Podhale Nowy Targ | 40 | 3 | 1 | 0 | 36 | 76 | 193 | −117 | 11 | |

Source: PHL

== Play-offs ==
=== Bracket ===
Quarter-finals (best-of-7)
1 | GKS Katowice | 4
8 | KH Zagłębie Sosnowiec | 1
2 | Unia Oświęcim | 4
7 | STS Sanok | 1
(Pairings are reseeded after the first round)
3 | GKS Jastrzębie | 4
6 | TKH Toruń | 3
4 | KS Cracovia | 2
5 | GKS Tychy | 4

Semi-finals (best-of-7)
1 | GKS Katowice | 4
5 | GKS Tychy | 3
2 | Unia Oświęcim | 4
3 | GKS Jastrzębie | 2

Finals (best-of-7)
1 | GKS Katowice | 4
2 | Unia Oświęcim | 0
Bronze medal (best-of-3)
3 | GKS Jastrzębie | 2
5 | GKS Tychy | 1

=== Quarterfinals ===
GKS Katowice – KH Zagłębie Sosnowiec 4–1
| 23.02.2022 | GKS Katowice | KH Zagłębie Sosnowiec | 6-1 |
| 24.02.2022 | GKS Katowice | KH Zagłębie Sosnowiec | 2-3 |
| 27.02.2022 | KH Zagłębie Sosnowiec | GKS Katowice | 3-5 |
| 28.02.2022 | KH Zagłębie Sosnowiec | GKS Katowice | 3-4 OT |
| 10.03.2022 | GKS Katowice | KH Zagłębie Sosnowiec | 9-1 |
GKS Katowice win the series 4–1.

GKS Jastrzębie – TKH Toruń 4–3
| 23.02.2022 | GKS Jastrzębie | TKH Toruń | 5-1 |
| 24.02.2022 | GKS Jastrzębie | TKH Toruń | 1-2 OT |
| 27.02.2022 | TKH Toruń | GKS Jastrzębie | 2-3 OT |
| 28.02.2022 | TKH Toruń | GKS Jastrzębie | 2-1 |
| 11.03.2022 | GKS Jastrzębie | TKH Toruń | 6-3 |
| 13.03.2022 | TKH Toruń | GKS Jastrzębie | 2-1 |
| 15.03.2022 | GKS Jastrzębie | TKH Toruń | 4-3 |
GKS Jastrzębie win the series 4–3.

Unia Oświęcim – STS Sanok 4–1
| 23.02.2022 | Unia Oświęcim | STS Sanok | 2-1 |
| 24.02.2022 | Unia Oświęcim | STS Sanok | 3-2 |
| 27.02.2022 | STS Sanok | Unia Oświęcim | 4-2 |
| 28.02.2022 | STS Sanok | Unia Oświęcim | 2-5 |
| 10.03.2022 | Unia Oświęcim | STS Sanok | 6-1 |
Unia Oświęcim win the series 4–1.

KS Cracovia – GKS Tychy 2–4
| 23.02.2022 | KS Cracovia | GKS Tychy | 2-3 |
| 24.02.2022 | KS Cracovia | GKS Tychy | 4-2 |
| 27.02.2022 | GKS Tychy | KS Cracovia | 3-1 |
| 28.02.2022 | GKS Tychy | KS Cracovia | 3-2 |
| 11.03.2022 | KS Cracovia | GKS Tychy | 3-2 OT |
| 13.03.2022 | GKS Tychy | KS Cracovia | 3-2 SO |
GKS Tychy win the series 4–2.

=== Semifinals ===
GKS Katowice – GKS Tychy 4–3
| 18.03.2022 | GKS Katowice | GKS Tychy | 2-0 |
| 19.03.2022 | GKS Katowice | GKS Tychy | 2-3 OT |
| 22.03.2022 | GKS Tychy | GKS Katowice | 6-2 |
| 23.03.2022 | GKS Tychy | GKS Katowice | 2-6 |
| 26.03.2022 | GKS Katowice | GKS Tychy | 2-1 |
| 28.03.2022 | GKS Tychy | GKS Katowice | 3-2 SO |
| 30.03.2022 | GKS Katowice | GKS Tychy | 3-2 OT |
GKS Katowice won the series 4–3.

Unia Oświęcim – GKS Jastrzębie 4–2
| 19.03.2022 | Unia Oświęcim | GKS Jastrzębie | 3-2 OT |
| 20.03.2022 | Unia Oświęcim | GKS Jastrzębie | 4-2 |
| 23.03.2022 | GKS Jastrzębie | Unia Oświęcim | 2-3 OT |
| 24.03.2022 | GKS Jastrzębie | Unia Oświęcim | 4-3 |
| 27.03.2022 | Unia Oświęcim | GKS Jastrzębie | 2-3 SO |
| 29.03.2022 | GKS Jastrzębie | Unia Oświęcim | 1-4 |
Unia Oświęcim won the series 4–2.

=== Third place ===
GKS Jastrzębie – GKS Tychy 2–1
| 04.04.2022 | GKS Jastrzębie | GKS Tychy | 4-5 |
| 07.04.2022 | GKS Tychy | GKS Jastrzębie | 2-5 |
| 10.04.2022 | GKS Jastrzębie | GKS Tychy | 3-1 |
GKS Jastrzębie won the series 2–1

=== Finals ===
| 3 April 2022; 17:30 (CEST) | GKS Katowice | 4–2 (0–0, 4–1, 0–1) score in the series: 1–0 | Unia Oświęcim | Spodek, Katowice; Attendance: 1,420 |

Game reference

John Murray
Goalies
Clarke Saunders
Referees:
Tomasz Radzik
Paweł Breske
Linesmen:
Dariusz Pobożniak
Andrzej Nenko

| Wronka (Fraszko, Kolusz) - 20:19 | 1–0 |
| Michalski (Bepierszcz, Krężołek) - 25:26 | 2–0 |
| Pasiut (Fraszko) (SH1) - 28:26 | 3–0 |
| | 3–1 | 32:30 - Da Costa (Carlsson) (PP1) |
| Pasiut (Kolusz) - 33:17 | 4–1 |
| | 4–2 | 48:40 - Streltsov (Dziubiński, Streltsov) |

8 min
Penalties
10 min
37
Shots
25

| 4 April 2022; 17:30 (CEST) | GKS Katowice | 1–0 (0–0, 1–0, 0–0) score in the series: 2–0 | Unia Oświęcim | Spodek, Katowice; Attendance: 1,420 |

Game reference
| John Murray | Goalies | Clarke Saunders | Referees: Bartosz Kaczmarek; Patryk Kasprzyk; Linesmen: Michał Gerne; Sławomir Szachniewicz |
| Pasiut (Kolusz, Wronka) - 27:44 / 1–0 | | | Referees: Bartosz Kaczmarek; Patryk Kasprzyk; Linesmen: Michał Gerne; Sławomir Szachniewicz |
| 6 min | Penalties | 6 min | Referees: Bartosz Kaczmarek; Patryk Kasprzyk; Linesmen: Michał Gerne; Sławomir Szachniewicz |
| 37 | Shots | 25 | Referees: Bartosz Kaczmarek; Patryk Kasprzyk; Linesmen: Michał Gerne; Sławomir Szachniewicz |

| 7 April 2022; 17:15 (CEST) | Unia Oświęcim | 3–5 (1–2, 1–2, 1–1) score in the series: 0–3 | GKS Katowice | Hala Lodowa MOSiR, Oświęcim |

Game reference

Clarke Saunders
Goalies
John Murray
Referees:
Marcin Polak
Krzysztof Kozłowski
Linesmen:
Wojciech Moszczyński
Michał Żak

| Themár (Dziubiński, Paszek) - 05:55 | 1–0 |
| | 1–1 | 12:09 - Kruczek (Eriksson, Lehtonen) |
| | 1–2 | 16:58 - Saarelainen (Eriksson, Lehtonen) (PP1) |
| | 1–3 | 27:20 - Pasiut (Rompkowski, Fraszko) |
| Orekhin (Carlsson) - 32:54 | 2–3 |
| | 2–4 | 38:03 - Monto (Eriksson) |
| Orekhin (Streltsov) - 43:45 | 3–4 |
| | 3–5 | 59:10 - Eriksson (Wronka) |

4 min
Penalties
4 min
31
Shots
35

| 8 April 2022; 20:00 (CEST) | Unia Oświęcim | 1–4 (0–2, 1–0, 0–2) score in the series: 0–4 | GKS Katowice | Hala Lodowa MOSiR, Oświęcim; Attendance: 3,200 |

Game reference

Clarke Saunders
Goalies
John Murray
Referees:
Paweł Kosidło
Paweł Breske
Linesmen:
Mateusz Kucharewicz
Wiktor Zień

| | 0–1 | 05:07 - Hudson (Lehtonen, Eriksson) |
| | 0–2 | 12:42 - Hudson (Lehtonen) |
| Streltsov (Apalkov) - 32:28 | 1–2 |
| | 1–3 | 46:07 - Eriksson (Monto, Kolusz) |
| | 1–4 | 59:15 - Lehtonen (Hudson, Wanacki) (PP1) |

29 min
Penalties
2 min
25
Shots
27

== Final rankings ==
| Gold medal | GKS Katowice |
| Silver medal | Unia Oświęcim |
| Bronze medal | GKS Jastrzębie |
| 4 | GKS Tychy |
| 5 | KS Cracovia |
| 6 | TKH Toruń |
| 7 | STS Sanok |
| 8 | KH Zagłębie Sosnowiec |
| 9 | Podhale Nowy Targ |
