= 2002–03 Polska Liga Hokejowa season =

Polish ice hockey season

The 2002–03 Polska Liga Hokejowa season was the 68th season of the Polska Liga Hokejowa, the top level of ice hockey in Poland. Eight teams participated in the league, and Unia Oswiecim won the championship.

== Regular season ==
	Club	GP	W	OTW	T	OTL	L	Goals	Pts
1.	Unia Oświęcim	42	33	1	2	1	5	229:90	104
2.	Podhale Nowy Targ	42	23	1	0	3	15	152:136	74
3.	GKS Katowice	42	22	2	2	2	14	161:145	74
4.	Stoczniowiec Gdansk	42	22	1	2	2	15	141:119	72
5.	GKS Tychy	42	19	2	0	2	19	161:148	60
6.	THK Torun	42	14	1	1	1	25	126:175	46
7.	Zaglebie Sosnowiec	42	13	2	1	0	26	134:182	44
8.	KTH Krynica	42	7	2	0	1	32	109:218	26

== Playoffs ==
Semi-finals
Unia Oświęcim	3
Stoczniowiec Gdansk	0
Podhale Nowy Targ	1
GKS Katowice	3

Final
Unia Oświęcim	4
GKS Katowice	0
Third place
Podhale Nowy Targ	0
Stoczniowiec Gdansk	3
