= 2001–02 Polska Liga Hokejowa season =

Polish ice hockey season

The 2001–02 Polska Liga Hokejowa season was the 67th season of the Polska Liga Hokejowa, the top level of ice hockey in Poland. Eight teams participated in the league, and Unia Oswiecim won the championship.

== Regular season ==
	Club	GP	W	OTW	T	OTL	L	Goals	Pts
1.	GKS Katowice	39	27	0	2	2	8	153:87	85
2.	GKS Tychy	39	23	2	1	1	12	170:116	75
3.	Unia Oświęcim	39	23	1	1	2	12	159:88	74
4.	Stoczniowiec Gdansk	39	21	2	2	3	11	131:96	72
5.	KTH Krynica	39	12	5	0	1	21	104:174	47
6.	Zaglebie Sosnowiec	39	9	2	1	3	24	116:148	35
7.	Podhale Nowy Targ	39	9	2	0	2	26	86:160	33
8.	Polonia Bytom	21	4	1	1	1	14	36:86	16

== Playoffs ==
Semi-finals
GKS Katowice	3
Stoczniowiec Gdansk	2
GKS Tychy	0
Unia Oświęcim	3

Final
GKS Katowice	3
Unia Oświęcim	4
Third place
GKS Tychy	4
Stoczniowiec Gdansk	0
