= Mariusz Czerkawski =

Polish ice hockey player (born 1972)

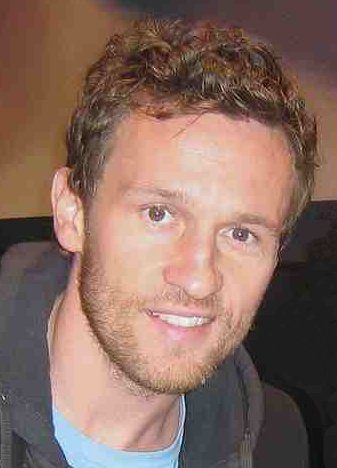
- Born: 13 April 1972 (age 54) Radomsko, Poland
- Height: 6 ft 0 in (183 cm)
- Weight: 200 lb (91 kg; 14 st 4 lb)
- Position: Right wing
- Shot: Left
- Played for: GKS Tychy; Djurgårdens IF; Boston Bruins; Kiekko-Espoo; Edmonton Oilers; New York Islanders; Montreal Canadiens; Toronto Maple Leafs; Rapperswil-Jona Lakers
- National team: Poland
- NHL draft: 106th overall, 1991; Boston Bruins
- Playing career: 1990–2008

Mariusz Krzysztof Czerkawski (pronounced [ˈmarjuʂ t͡ʂɛrˈkafskʲi]; born 13 April 1972) is a Polish former professional ice hockey player. He played in the National Hockey League (NHL) for the Boston Bruins, Edmonton Oilers, New York Islanders, Montreal Canadiens and Toronto Maple Leafs. In addition to playing in the NHL, Czerkawski played for several different European-based teams. A consistent scorer, Czerkawski was the first player born and trained in Poland to play in the NHL. Internationally, Czerkawski represented Poland in several tournaments, including the 1992 Winter Olympics and the 1992 and 2002 World Championships.

== Playing career ==
Czerkawski first played hockey when he was 8 years old, and from a young age was part of the GKS Tychy program. After a strong season with GKS Tychy in 1990–91, where he scored 40 points in 24 games, the Boston Bruins drafted him in the 1991 NHL entry draft in the fifth round, 105th overall. Czerkawski joined Djurgårdens IF of the Elitserien for the 1991–92 season. He was the first foreign player to play for Djurgårdens since Canadian Steve Cardwell in 1976–77. Czerkawski did not play often during his first season, and finished with 13 points in 39 games. Loaned to Hammarby of the second-tier Division 1 for 1992–93, Czerkawski greatly improved, and was brought back to Djurgårdens for 1993–94, recording 34 points in 39 games.

After the season ended Czerkawski went to North America, making his National Hockey League (NHL) debut at the end of the 1993–94 NHL season with the Bruins, playing his first game on April 9 against the Tampa Bay Lightning. He scored his first goal on April 13, his third game, against the Ottawa Senators, and finished the season with two goals and one assist in four games. Though previous NHL players had been born in Poland, Czerkawski was the first Polish-trained NHLer. The next season, he played 47 games with the Bruins, collecting 12 goals and 14 assists in a lockout-shortened season.

In 1996, Czerkawski was traded to the Edmonton Oilers. He played season and a half there before another trade sent him to the New York Islanders, where he would have his most productive years, including two 30-goal plus seasons and being named to the 2000 NHL All-Star Game. However, after being traded to the Montreal Canadiens in 2002, he found himself sent to their American Hockey League (AHL) affiliate, the Hamilton Bulldogs. His contract was then bought-out by Montreal, after which he signed a one-year contract with the Islanders in 2003, recording another 25-goal season.

The 2004–05 NHL lockout saw the NHL not play in 2004–05, so Czerkawski joined Djurgårdens for the season, where he had 24 points in 46 games. Returning to the NHL, he signed as a free agent with the Toronto Maple Leafs. He played 19 games for the Maple Leafs, scoring 5 points, before being put on waivers and being claimed by the Boston Bruins on 7 March 2006. He played 16 games with the Bruins, scoring four goals and one assist.

Czerkawski joined the Rapperswil-Jona Lakers of the Swiss National League A (NLA) in 2006. He played two seasons for the club, collecting respectively 41 and 53 points. He retired in 2008, though returned to play one final match for Tychy in January 2009.

== International play ==
Czerkawski's first international tournament with the Polish national under-18 team was at the 1989 European U18 Division B Championship, where he recorded 11 points in 5 games and helped Poland earn promotion to the top level for 1990. Joining the team at the 1990 tournament, he had 12 points in 6 games. He also played for Poland at the 1990 World Junior Championship, scoring one goal in seven games. Poland was relegated to Pool B (the second tier) for 1991, where Czerkawski had 12 goals and 3 assists, for 15 points, in 7 games. He also made his debut for the Polish senior team that year, playing in Pool B at the 1991 World Championships and scoring 8 points in 7 games and helping Poland earn promotion to the top tier for the following year.

At the 1992 Winter Olympics Czerkawski played five games, and had one assist. He played a further 6 games at the 1992 World Championships, but did not score any points. It would not be until 1998 that Czerkawski again played internationally, joining Poland at the renamed Group B of the World Championships, where he had 3 points in 3 games. He would return again in 2000 and had 11 points in 7 games. Poland had earned promotion to the 2002 World Championship and Czerkawski scored 4 points in 3 games, though Poland was relegated back to the second tier (then known as Division I). His final tournament would be at the 2006 World Championship Division I, where he had 7 points in 5 games.

== Personal life ==
Czerkawski was married from 1996 to 1998 to Polish-Swedish actress Izabella Scorupco, and they have a daughter. Since 1 September 2007, he has been married to Emilia Raszyńska, with whom he has a son. After retiring from ice hockey, he took up golf.

For his contribution to the development of Polish ice hockey, Czerkawski received the Knight's Cross of the Order of Polonia Restituta (5th Class) in 2004.

== Career statistics ==
=== Regular season and playoffs ===
			Regular season					Playoffs
Season	Team	League	GP	G	A	Pts	PIM	GP	G	A	Pts	PIM
1988–89	GKS Tychy	POL U20	—	—	—	—	—	—	—	—	—	—
1989–90	GKS Tychy	POL U20	30	35	11	46	—	—	—	—	—	—
1990–91	GKS Tychy	POL	24	25	15	40	—	—	—	—	—	—
1991–92	Djurgårdens IF	SEL	39	8	5	13	4	3	0	0	0	2
1992–93	Hammarby IF	SWE.2	32	39	30	69	74	13	16	7	23	34
1993–94	Djurgårdens IF	SEL	39	13	21	34	20	6	3	1	4	2
1993–94	Boston Bruins	NHL	4	2	1	3	0	13	3	3	6	4
1994–95	Kiekko-Espoo	SM-l	7	9	3	12	10	—	—	—	—	—
1994–95	Boston Bruins	NHL	47	12	14	26	31	5	1	0	1	0
1995–96	Boston Bruins	NHL	33	5	6	11	10	—	—	—	—	—
1995–96	Edmonton Oilers	NHL	37	12	17	29	8	—	—	—	—	—
1996–97	Edmonton Oilers	NHL	76	26	21	47	16	12	2	1	3	10
1997–98	New York Islanders	NHL	68	12	13	25	23	—	—	—	—	—
1998–99	New York Islanders	NHL	78	21	17	38	14	—	—	—	—	—
1999–2000	New York Islanders	NHL	79	35	35	70	34	—	—	—	—	—
2000–01	New York Islanders	NHL	82	30	32	62	48	—	—	—	—	—
2001–02	New York Islanders	NHL	82	22	29	51	48	7	2	2	4	4
2002–03	Montreal Canadiens	NHL	43	5	9	14	16	—	—	—	—	—
2002–03	Hamilton Bulldogs	AHL	20	8	12	20	12	6	1	3	4	6
2003–04	New York Islanders	NHL	81	25	24	49	16	5	0	1	1	0
2004–05	Djurgårdens IF	SEL	46	15	9	24	20	5	1	0	1	2
2005–06	Toronto Maple Leafs	NHL	19	4	1	5	6	—	—	—	—	—
2005–06	Boston Bruins	NHL	16	4	1	5	4	—	—	—	—	—
2006–07	Rapperswil–Jona Lakers	NLA	43	21	20	41	70	7	6	6	12	16
2007–08	Rapperswil–Jona Lakers	NLA	49	22	31	53	30	5	1	0	1	4
2008–09	GKS Tychy	POL	1	0	0	0	0	—	—	—	—	—
SEL totals			124	36	35	71	44	14	4	1	5	6
NHL totals			745	215	220	435	274	42	8	7	15	18
NLA totals			92	43	51	94	100	12	7	6	13	20

=== International ===
Year	Team	Event	GP	G	A	Pts	PIM
1989	Poland	EJC B	5	5	6	11	6
1990	Poland	EJC	6	9	3	12	14
1990	Poland	WJC	7	1	0	1	4
1991	Poland	WJC B	7	12	3	15	2
1991	Poland	WC B	7	6	2	8	4
1992	Poland	OG	5	0	1	1	4
1992	Poland	WC	6	0	0	0	4
1998	Poland	WC B	3	2	1	3	0
2000	Poland	WC B	7	4	7	11	2
2002	Poland	WC	3	2	2	4	4
2005	Poland	OGQ	6	6	4	10	4
2006	Poland	WC D1	5	3	4	7	2
Junior totals			13	10	3	13	18
Senior totals			42	23	21	44	24

=== All Star Games ===
Year	Location	G	A	Pts
2000	Toronto	0	1	1
All-Star Totals		0	1	1

- All statistics taken from NHL.com

== Awards ==
=== International ===
Award	Year
IIHF U-20 Division I Best Player	1990
