= Roman Dyukov =

Belarusian ice hockey player

- Born: September 29, 1995 (age 30) Minsk, Belarus
- Height: 6 ft 2 in (188 cm)
- Weight: 203 lb (92 kg; 14 st 7 lb)
- Position: Defence
- Shoots: Left
- VHL team Former teams: Khimik Voskresensk; Yunost Minsk; Adirondack Thunder; Dinamo Minsk
- National team: Belarus
- Playing career: 2011–present

Roman Dyukov (born September 29, 1995) is a Belarusian professional ice hockey defenceman for TH Unia Oświęcim of the Polska Hokej Liga (PHL).

== Playing career ==
Dyukov previously made his professional debut having played since youth level, with Yunost Minsk in the Belarusian Hockey League. He made his Belarusian national team debut at the 2016 IIHF World Championship. Following the World Championships, on July 28, 2016, Dyukov agreed to pursue an NHL career, attending the Calgary Flames rookie camp and signing a one-year AHL contract with affiliate, the Stockton Heat.

Dyukov was unable to feature with the Heat in the 2016–17 season, after he was assigned to ECHL affiliate, the Adirondack Thunder for the duration of the campaign. As a free agent after 17 points in 54 games, Dyukov left North America to return to his native Belarus and sign a one-year contract with HC Dinamo Minsk of the KHL on June 15, 2017.
