= Poland men's national ice hockey team =

Men's national ice hockey team representing Poland

Poland
- Nickname: Orły (The Eagles)
- Association: Polish Ice Hockey Federation
- General manager: Jarosław Rzeszutko
- Head coach: Pekka Tirkkonen
- Assistants: Tobiasz Bigos; Grzegorz Klich
- Captain: Kamil Górny
- Most games: Krystian Dziubiński (264)
- Top scorer: Krystian Dziubiński (94)
- Most points: Krystian Dziubiński (177)
- Team colors
- IIHF code: POL

Ranking
- Current IIHF: 20 (▼1) (3 June 2026)
- Highest IIHF: 19 (2003, 2025)
- Lowest IIHF: 25 (2014)

First international
- Austria 13–1 Poland (Davos, Switzerland; 10 January 1926)

Biggest win
- Poland 21–1 China (Eindhoven, Netherlands; 26 March 1993)

Biggest defeat
- Soviet Union 20–0 Poland (Moscow, Soviet Union; 11 April 1973)

Olympics
- Appearances: 13 (first in 1928)

IIHF World Championships
- Appearances: 62 (first in 1930)
- Best result: 4th (1931, 1932)

IIHF European Championships
- Appearances: 3 (first in 1926)
- Best result: (silver) (1929)

International record (W–L–T)
- 539–579–90

The Poland national men's ice hockey team is the national ice hockey team of Poland, and a member of the International Ice Hockey Federation. They are ranked 21st in the world in the IIHF World Rankings, but prior to the 1980s they were ranked as high as 6th internationally. They are one of eight countries never to have played below the Division I (former B Pool) level. As of 2024 the Polish national team plays at the top level of the World Championship.

Poland has competed in the Olympics thirteen times, most recently in 1992, with their best result being fourth place in 1932. They have been a regular participant of the World Championship, first appearing in 1930 and having appeared in all but one tournament since 1955. They frequently played in the top division, though were in Division I after being relegated in 2002. Poland made a return to the top division of the World Championship for 2024.

== History ==
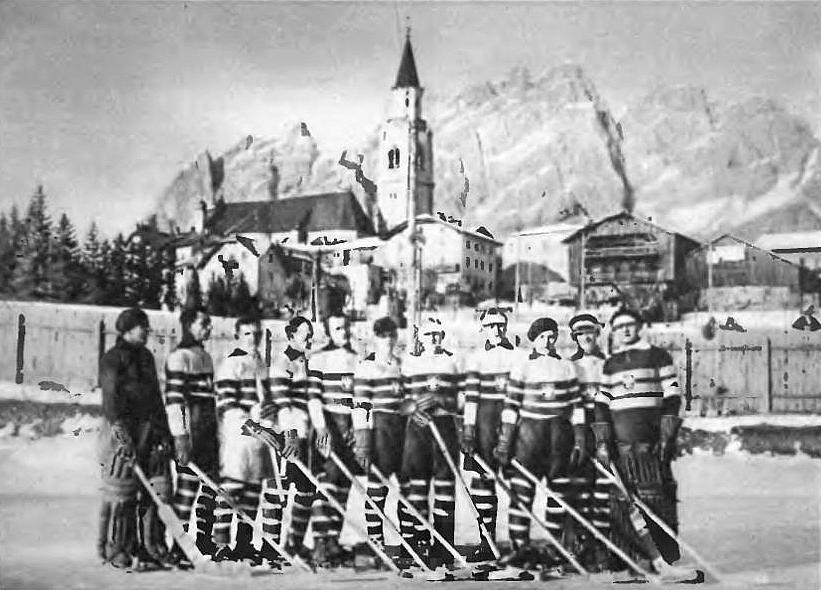
Poland at the 1928 Winter Olympics in St. Moritz, Switzerland, their first appearance at the Winter Olympics. They finished ninth.

Poland was a regular participant of the early Winter Olympics, first competing at the 1928 Winter Olympics in St. Moritz, Switzerland, where they finished ninth out of eleven teams. They would appear at ever Winter Olympics until 1956, with their best finish being fourth in 1932.

Financed by state coal money from the 1950s to the 1970s the Polish hockey team was a regular at the top level upsetting the Swedes, Finns, and Czechoslovaks from time to time. They hosted the World Championship for the only time in 1976, with the matches taking place in Katowice. At this tournament Poland defeated the Soviet Union 6–4 in their opening match, the first and only time Poland ever won against the Soviets and is regarded as one of the greatest upsets in international hockey history. While Poland finished seventh and was relegated for the following year, their victory against the USSR helped prevent them from winning gold for only the second time in 13 years.

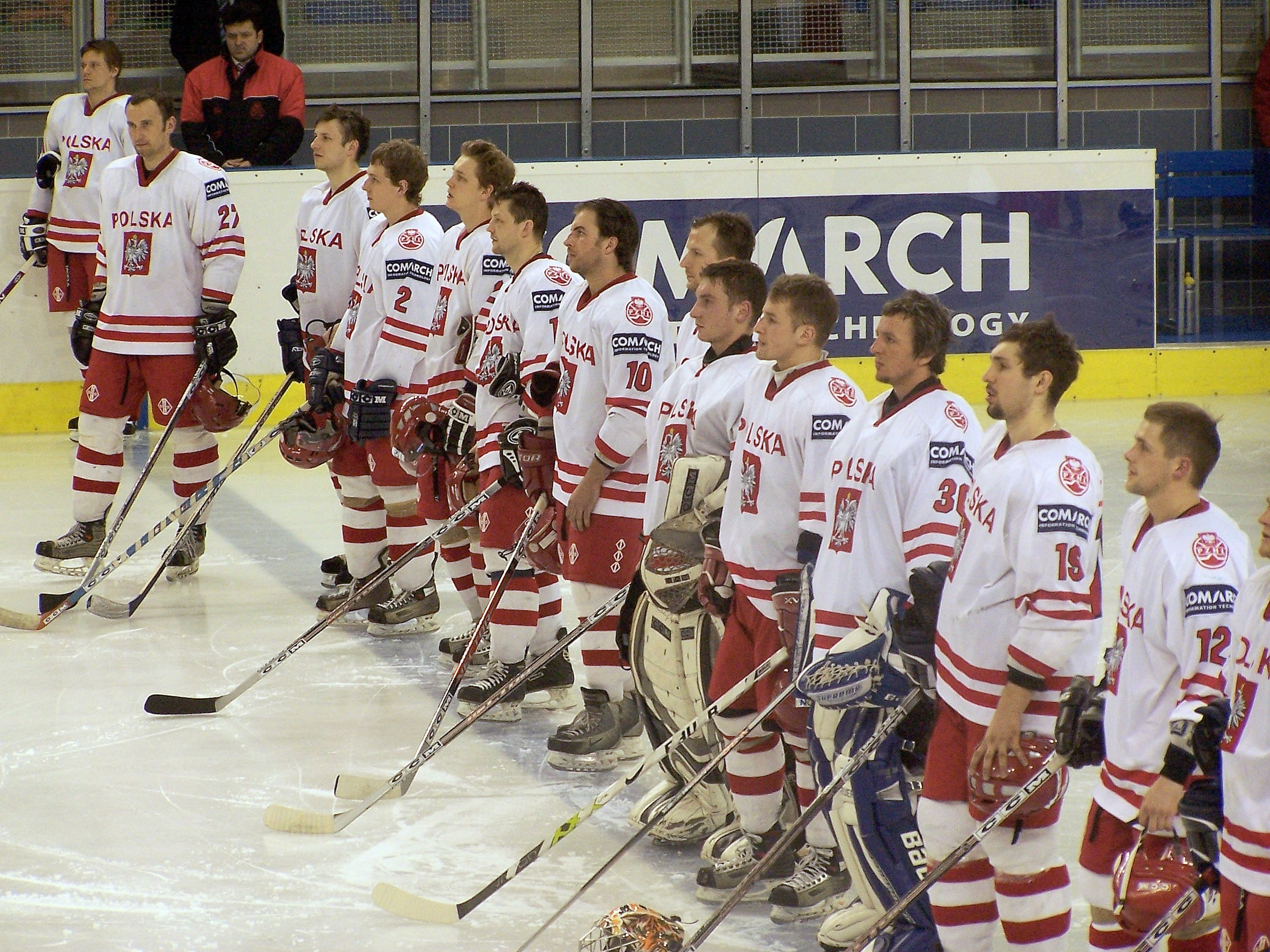
The national team in 2006.

In the Olympics earlier that year, Poland played 5 matches in the top division, but lost all of them. In the first game, the team managed four goals on the West Germany but it was not enough as they lost 7–4. Four days later, after being destroyed by the Soviet Union, the Poles took on Czechoslovakia who dominated the whole game throughout and won 7–1, but after the drug testing, the officials found that one of the Czech players tested positive for doping and they awarded Poland with a 1–0 victory, although they didn't receive any points in the standings. With only two games left and no points in the standings, Poland had no shot at a medal, but still played the last two games against the United States and Finland, and lost 7–2 and 7–1 respectively.

Poland managed to clean up a bit over four years and played well during the 1980 Olympics and finished seventh out of twelve teams. They managed to pull off a huge upset in their first game by beating Finland 5–4, who would eventually advance to the medal round. In their next game, they played Canada and hoped to complete an even bigger upset. The Canadians didn't let this happen and beat the Poles 5–1. In the third game, Poland took on the five time gold medalists, the Soviet Union. The players knew that this would be a challenge because they had played the Soviets many times before and had lost by usually very lopsided scores, such as 8–3, 9–3, 16–1, and 20–0. The Polish team, however, had also beaten the Soviets once in the 1976 World Championship and some of the players from that game were still on the team. The team tried to keep the Soviets down, but it was too much and the USSR stormed to an 8–1 win.

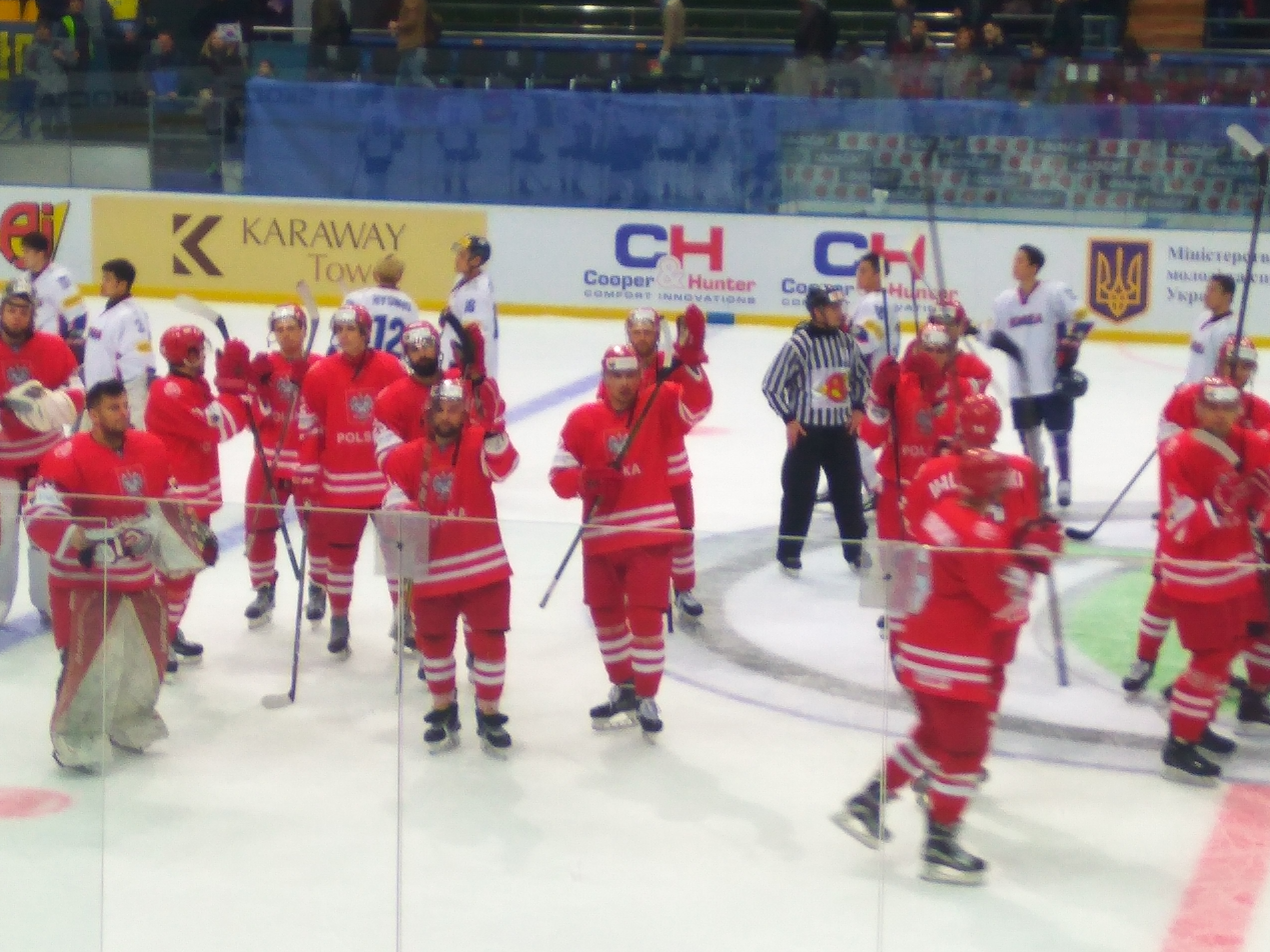
Poland at the 2017 World Championship Division IA tournament in Ukraine. They finished fourth.

With their toughest games out of the way, Poland would have one more chance to try to get to the Medal Round. They took on the Netherlands and went down early in the first period but managed to tie it about four minutes later. The Dutch team scored twice more in the period to lead 3–1. Polish hero Wieslaw Jobczyk (who scored a hat trick in the 1976 upset against USSR) scored to put Poland within one goal but the Netherlands stormed back to get two more goals before the third period to make it 5–2. The Poles ended up losing 5–3 and saw their hopes for the medal round come to an end. They had one more game against Japan, who had not won any games in the tournament and only tied once. Poland burst out in the first period and scored 3 goals before twenty minutes had ended. They scored two more goals and Japan seemed out of it. The final score was 5–1 for Poland. The team's final record was 2–3–0 and it received 4 points in the standings.

When Communist rule ended in 1989, the Polish national team began a slow decline in international play. They reached the Olympics in 1992, the most recent time they have played there, and finished eleventh out of twelve teams. During the 1990s the first two Polish-born and trained players were selected in the NHL entry draft: Mariusz Czerkawski was selected in the 1991 by the Boston Bruins, and Krzysztof Oliwa in 1993 by the New Jersey Devils; Oliwa won the Stanley Cup with the Devils in 2000, the first and only Pole to do so.

At the 2001 World Championships in France, coached by Wiktor Pysz, Poland earned promotion from Division I for the first time in ten years. Playing in the top tier at the 2002 World Championship in Sweden, Poland placed 14th and was relegated back to Division I. Hosting 2006 Winter Olympics qualification in Nowy Targ, Poland placed first in Group E but not advance beyond the next round. Four years later, hosting 2010 Winter Olympics qualification in Sanok, Poland placed second and did not advance.

Leszek Laszkiewicz was named Poland's general manager in 2019. In his first World Championship as manager, Poland placed second in 2019, missing promotion from Division I to the top tier when losing their final game in overtime to Romania. Scheduled to host Group B of the 2020 World Championship in Katowice, the tournament was postponed to 2021 then cancelled due to the COVID-19 pandemic. Hosting the 2022 tournament in Katowice, Poland placed first in Group B and promoted to Division I A. Placing second in 2023 earned Poland promotion to the top division in 2024, their first appearance in the top division since 2002 when Laszkiewicz played. With an eighth-place finish at the 2024 World Championship, Poland was relegated back to Division I A. Placing fifth in 2025, Poland remained in Division I A.

== Tournament record ==
=== Olympic Games ===
Games	GP	W	OW	T	OL	L	GF	GA	Coach	Captain	Finish	Rank
(Switzerland) 1928 St. Moritz	2	0	0	1	0	1	4	5	?	Tadeusz Adamowski	First round	9th
(United States) 1932 Lake Placid	6	0	0	0	0	6	3	34	Tadeusz Sachs	?	First round	4th
(Nazi Germany) 1936 Garmisch-Partenkirchen	3	1	0	0	0	2	11	12	Aleksander Tupalski, Lucjan Kulej	?	First round	9th
(Switzerland) 1948 St. Moritz	8	2	0	0	0	6	29	97	Zbigniew Kasprzak	?	Round-robin	6th (7th)
(Norway) 1952 Oslo	8	2	0	1	0	5	21	56	Mieczysław Kasprzycki	?	Round-robin	6th
(Italy) 1956 Cortina d'Ampezzo	5	2	0	0	0	3	15	22	Mieczysław Palus, Wladyslaw Wiro-Kiro	Józef Kurek	Consolation round	8th
(United States) 1960 Squaw Valley	Did not participate											
(Austria) 1964 Innsbruck	8	6	0	0	0	2	41	15	Gary Hughes	Józef Kurek	Consolation round	9th
(France) 1968 Grenoble	Did not participate											
(Japan) 1972 Sapporo	6	1	0	0	0	5	13	39	Anatoli Yegorov, Mieczysław Chmura	Ludwik Czachowski	Final Round	6th
(Austria) 1976 Innsbruck	6	2	0	0	0	4	16	41	Józef Kurek	Robert Góralczyk	Final Round	6th
(United States) 1980 Lake Placid	5	2	0	0	0	3	15	23	Czeslaw Borowicz	Stefan Chowaniec	First round	7th
(Socialist Federal Republic of Yugoslavia) 1984 Sarajevo	6	1	0	0	0	5	20	44	Emil Nikodemowicz	Henryk Gruth	7th place game	8th
(Canada) 1988 Calgary	6	1	0	1	0	4	12	15	Leszek Lejczyk, Jerzy Mruk	Henryk Gruth	9th place game	10th
(France) 1992 Albertville	9	2	0	0	0	5	25	47	Leszek Lejczyk, Jerzy Mruk	Henryk Gruth	11th place match	11th
(Norway) 1994 Lillehammer	Did not qualify											
(Japan) 1998 Nagano	Did not qualify											
(United States) 2002 Salt Lake City	Did not qualify											
(Italy) 2006 Turin	Did not qualify											
(Canada) 2010 Vancouver	Did not qualify											
(Russia) 2014 Sochi	Did not qualify											
(South Korea) 2018 Pyeongchang	Did not qualify											
(China) 2022 Beijing	Did not qualify											
(Italy) 2026 Milan–Cortina	Did not qualify											
(France) 2030 French Alps	To be determined											

=== World Championship ===
- 1930 – 5th place
- 1931 – 4th place
- 1933 – 7th place
- 1935 – 10th place
- 1937 – 8th place
- 1938 – 7th place
- 1939 – 6th place
- 1947 – 6th place
- 1955 – 7th place
- 1957 – 6th place
- 1958 – 8th place
- 1959 – 11th place
- 1961 – 13th place (5th in Pool B)
- 1963 – 12th place (4th in Pool B)
- 1965 – 9th place (1st in Pool B)
- 1966 – 8th place
- 1967 – 9th place (1st in Pool B)
- 1969 – 8th place (2nd in Pool B)
- 1970 – 6th place
- 1971 – 8th place (2nd in Pool B)
- 1972 – 7th place (1st in Pool B)
- 1973 – 5th place
- 1974 – 5th place
- 1975 – 5th place
- 1976 – 7th place
- 1977 – 10th place (2nd in Pool B)
- 1978 – 9th place (1st in Pool B)
- 1979 – 8th place
- 1981 – 10th place (2nd in Pool B)
- 1982 – 11th place (3rd in Pool B)
- 1983 – 10th place (2nd in Pool B)
- 1985 – 9th place (1st in Pool B)
- 1986 – 8th place
- 1987 – 9th place (1st in Pool B)
- 1989 – 8th place
- 1990 – 14th place (6th in Pool B)
- 1991 – 12th place (4th in Pool B)
- 1992 – 12th place
- 1993 – 14th place (2nd in Pool B)
- 1994 – 15th place (3rd in Pool B)
- 1995 – 15th place (3rd in Pool B)
- 1996 – 17th place (5th in Pool B)
- 1997 – 17th place (5th in Pool B)
- 1998 – 23rd place (7th in Pool B)
- 1999 – 23rd place (7th in Pool B)
- 2000 – 20th place (4th in Pool B), hosts in Katowice and Kraków
- 2001 – 18th place (1st in Division I, Group A, Promoted to the 2002 Top Division)
- 2002 – 14th place
- 2003 – 19th place (2nd in Division I, Group A)
- 2004 – 21st place (3rd in Division I, Group B), hosts in Gdańsk.
- 2005 – 19th place (2nd in Division I, Group A)
- 2006 – 21st place (3rd in Division I, Group B)
- 2007 – 20th place (2nd in Division I, Group A)
- 2008 – 22nd place (3rd in Division I, Group A)
- 2009 – 23rd place (4th in Division I, Group B), hosts in Toruń
- 2010 – 22nd place (3rd in Division I, Group B)
- 2011 – 23rd place (4th in Division I, Group B)
- 2012 – 24th place (2nd in Division I, Group B), hosts in Krynica-Zdrój
- 2013 – 24th place (2nd in Division I, Group B)
- 2014 – 23rd place (1st in Division I, Group B)
- 2015 – 19th place (3rd in Division I, Group A), hosts in Kraków
- 2016 – 19th place (3rd in Division I, Group A)
- 2017 – 20th place (4th in Division I, Group A)
- 2018 – 22nd place (6th in Division I, Group A)
- 2019 – 24th place (2nd in Division I, Group B)
- 2020 – Cancelled due to the COVID-19 pandemic
- 2021 – Cancelled due to the COVID-19 pandemic
- 2022 – 21st place (1st in Division I, Group B)
- 2023 – 18th place (2nd in Division I, Group A, Promoted to the 2024 Top Division)
- 2024 – 16th place
- 2025 – 21st place (5th in Division I, Group A)
- 2026 – 20th place (4th in Division I, Group A)

=== European Championships ===
Games	GP	W	T	L	GF	GA	Coach	Captain	Finish	Rank
1910–1925	did not participate.									
(Switzerland) 1926 Davos	5	3	0	2	12	7	?	?	Consolation round 6–7 place game	6th
(Austria) 1927 Wien	5	1	2	2	11	9	?	?	Round-robin	4th
(Hungary) 1929 Budapest	3	2	0	1	6	3	?	?	Final	2nd place, silver medalist(s)
(Germany) 1932 Berlin	did not participate.									

== Team ==
=== Former players in the NHL ===
Players who have played in the NHL and the Polish national team

Year	Name	Position	Team
1993–2006	Mariusz Czerkawski	RW	Boston Bruins; Edmonton Oilers; New York Islanders; Montreal Canadiens; Toronto Maple Leafs
1996–2006	Krzysztof Oliwa	LW	New Jersey Devils; Columbus Blue Jackets; Pittsburgh Penguins; New York Rangers; Boston Bruins; Calgary Flames
2015–2016	Mike Danton	C	New Jersey Devils; St. Louis Blues

=== NHL entry draft ===
Polish players selected in the NHL entry draft

Year	Name	Overall	Team	Note
1981	Peter Sidorkiewicz	91st overall	Washington Capitals	Born in Poland, represented Canada internationally
1991	Mariusz Czerkawski	106th overall	Boston Bruins	
1993	Krzysztof Oliwa	65th overall	New Jersey Devils	
1995	David Lemanowicz	218th overall	Florida Panthers	Born in Canada, of Polish descent
1993	Patryk Pysz	102nd overall	Chicago Blackhawks	
1998	Tomek Valtonen	56th overall	Detroit Red Wings	Born in Poland, represented Finland internationally
2000	Krys Kolanos	19th overall	Phoenix Coyotes	Born in Canada, of Polish descent
2000	Stefan Liv	102nd overall	Detroit Red Wings	Born in Poland, represented Sweden internationally
2000	Mike Danton	135th overall	New Jersey Devils	Naturalized during career
2001	Mike Komisarek	7th overall	Montreal Canadiens	Born in USA, of Polish descent
2003	Marcin Kolusz	157th overall	Minnesota Wild	
2004	Wojtek Wolski	21st overall	Colorado Avalanche	Born in Poland, represented Canada internationally
2004	Evan McGrath	128th overall	Detroit Red Wings	Born in Canada, of Polish descent
2004	Jan Steber	252nd overall	Toronto Maple Leafs	Naturalized during career
2006	Nick Sucharski	136th overall	Columbus Blue Jackets	Born in Canada, of Polish descent
2009	Michael Cichy	199th overall	Montreal Canadiens	Born in USA, of Polish descent
2022	Maksymilian Szuber	163rd overall	Arizona Coyotes	Born in Poland, represents Germany internationally

=== Notable national team players ===
- Henryk Gruth: Poland's captain from 1982 to 1994. Played at the Winter Olympics in 1980, 1984], 1988 and 1992, and at 17 Ice Hockey World Championships. Holds the record for the most games (248) and the most points (109).
- Leszek Laszkiewicz: Poland's captain from 2008 to 2011. Played 216 games for the national team, scored 89 goals and 150 points.
- Andrzej Zabawa: Most goals scored (99)

=== Other Polish-born NHL players ===
- Nick Harbaruk – Pittsburgh Penguins, St. Louis Blues
- Frank Jerwa – Boston Bruins, St. Louis Eagles
- Joe Jerwa – New York Rangers, Boston Bruins, New York Americans
- Edward Leier – Chicago Blackhawks
- John Miszuk – Detroit Red Wings, Chicago Blackhawks, Philadelphia Flyers, Minnesota North Stars

== Head-to-head records ==
Updated as of 8 November 2025. Defunct national teams are listed in italics.

Opponent	Played	Won	Drawn	Lost	GF	GA	GD
Australia	1	1	0	0	5	3	+2
Austria	60	26	3	31	183	181	+2
Belarus	17	4	0	13	38	77	+39
Belgium	5	4	1	0	29	6	+23
Bulgaria	2	2	0	0	27	2	+25
Canada	25	0	1	24	22	175	-153
China	6	6	0	0	79	11	+68
Croatia	5	5	0	0	33	4	+29
Czech Republic	1	0	1	0	2	2	0
Czechoslovakia	44	2	2	40	58	336	-278
Denmark	32	18	3	11	134	102	+32
East Germany	71	35	13	23	302	234	+68
Estonia	20	18	1	1	99	36	+63
Finland	52	5	8	39	107	264	−157
France	54	21	6	27	146	154	-8
Germany	54	16	7	31	161	192	-31
Great Britain	39	11	2	26	114	133	-19
Hungary	69	37	6	26	214	151	+63
Italy	62	35	4	23	204	153	+51
Japan	42	34	2	6	214	98	+116
Kazakhstan	22	2	1	19	43	84	-41
Latvia	21	5	0	16	50	72	-22
Lithuania	24	20	0	4	130	48	+82
Netherlands	40	35	2	3	209	85	+124
Norway	77	39	7	31	316	243	+73
Romania	62	50	5	7	390	106	+284
Serbia	1	1	0	0	10	2	+8
Serbia and Montenegro	1	1	0	0	13	2	+11
Slovakia	9	0	1	8	12	51	−39
Slovenia	30	10	0	20	64	82	-18
South Korea	15	10	0	5	59	32	+27
Soviet Union	33	1	0	32	43	321	-278
Spain	2	2	0	0	9	1	+8
Sweden	37	5	4	28	62	232	−170
Switzerland	46	20	6	20	159	165	-6
Ukraine	46	20	2	24	122	138	-16
United States	36	6	2	28	43	191	−148
Yugoslavia	21	19	1	1	139	53	+86
Total	1 184	526	91	567	4 044	4 222	-168
