= Daniel Laszkiewicz =

Personal information
- Nationality: Polish
- Born: February 2, 1976 (age 50) Duszniki-Zdrój, Poland
- Height: 183 cm (6 ft 0 in)

Sport
- Position: Forward
- Shoots: Right

Daniel Laszkiewicz (born February 2, 1976, in Duszniki-Zdrój) is a former Polish ice hockey player.

His brother, Leszek, also became an ice hockey player (from 2006 to 2013 they played together at Cracovia). His son, Oskar, also started playing the sport.

== Career ==
- SMS I Sosnowiec (1995–1996)
- KTH Krynica (1997–2002)
- Unia Oświęcim (2002–2004)
- TKH Toruń (2004–2006)
- Cracovia (2006–2014)

Laszkiewicz graduated from NLO SMS PZHL Sosnowiec in 1996. He participated in the Ice hockey at the 1997 Winter Universiade tournament.

From 2006, he represented Cracovia Kraków (captain of the team from 2011 and again from September 2012). In May 2013, he extended his contract for another year. In June 2014, he left the club and announced his retirement. On September 21, 2014, a farewell exhibition match was held for him.

During his career, he was known by the nickname "Dany".

Laszkiewicz completed coaching studies.

== Doping ==
In November 2005, he was reprimanded for using a banned substance (ephedrine). On October 19, 2011, the PZHL's Disciplinary and Games Department disqualified him for a year for using ephedrine.
