= 2005–06 Polska Liga Hokejowa season =

71st season of the Polska Liga Hokejowa, the top level of ice hockey in Poland

The 2005–06 Polska Liga Hokejowa season was the 71st season of the Polska Liga Hokejowa, the top level of ice hockey in Poland. Eight teams participated in the league, and KS Cracovia won the championship.

== Regular season ==
	Club	GP	W	OTW	T	OTL	L	Goals	Pts
1.	KS Cracovia	42	29	1	1	0	11	174:99	90
2.	Unia Oświęcim	42	24	1	5	0	12	138:99	79
3.	GKS Tychy	42	23	0	5	1	13	145:97	75
4.	Podhale Nowy Targ	42	22	2	4	0	14	183:116	74
5.	THK Torun	42	20	1	8	2	11	135:92	72
6.	Stoczniowiec Gdansk	42	11	2	3	2	20	126:154	46
7.	Zaglebie Sosnowiec	42	10	0	0	1	31	121:205	31
8.	KH Sanok	42	5	0	4	1	32	86:246	20

== Playoffs ==
Semi-finals
KS Cracovia	4
Podhale Nowy Targ	2
Unia Oświęcim	0
GKS Tychy	4

Final
KS Cracovia	4
GKS Tychy	1
Third place
Unia Oświęcim	1
Podhale Nowy Targ	3
