= Anthon Eriksson =

Swedish ice hockey player (born 1995)

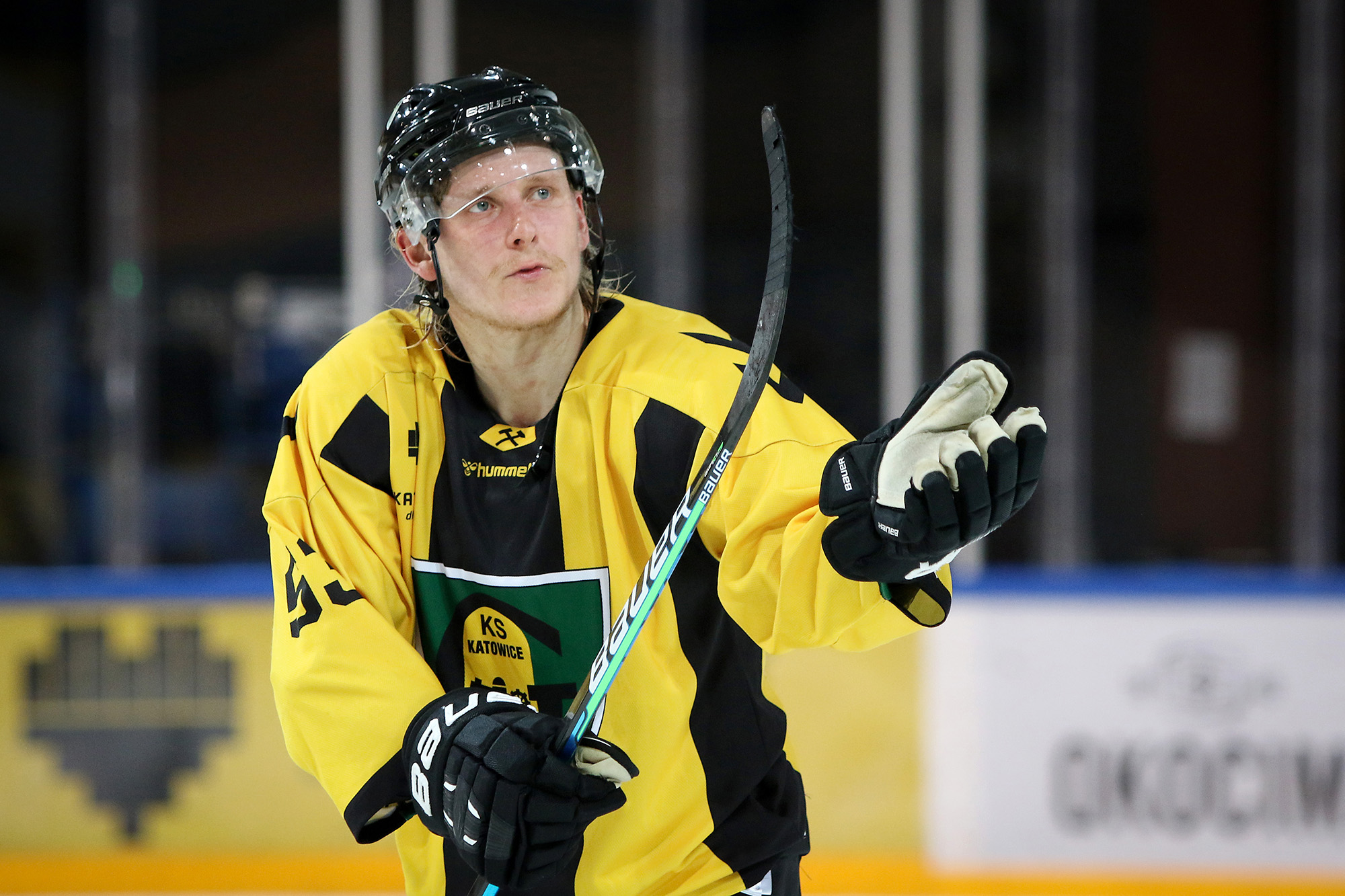
- Eriksson in 2021
- Born: February 25, 1995 (age 30) Kalix, Sweden
- Height: 6 ft 1 in (185 cm)
- Weight: 176 lb (80 kg; 12 st 8 lb)
- Position: Centre
- Shoots: Left
- HockeyAllsvenskan team Former teams: Mora IK; Lulea HF; GKS Katowice; Västerås IK; Fife Flyers
- NHL draft: Undrafted
- Playing career: 2013–present

Anthon Eriksson (born February 25, 1995) is a Swedish ice hockey player, currently signed to HockeyAllsvenskan side Mora IK. He most recently played with Scottish side Fife Flyers of the UK's Elite Ice Hockey League (EIHL).

Eriksson made his Swedish Hockey League debut playing with Luleå HF during the 2013–14 SHL season. Since the 2021–2022, season he plays in GKS Katowice, Poland.
