= 1996–97 Polska Liga Hokejowa season =

Polish ice hockey season

The 1996–97 Polska Liga Hokejowa season was the 62nd season of the Polska Liga Hokejowa, the top level of ice hockey in Poland. Thirteen teams participated in the league, and Podhale Nowy Targ won the championship.

== Final round ==
	Club	GP	W	T	L	Goals	Pts
1.	Podhale Nowy Targ	40	31	0	9	215:99	62
2.	KKH Katowice	40	28	2	10	168:120	58
3.	Unia Oświęcim	40	26	1	13	186:105	53
4.	STS Sanok	40	15	1	24	103:83	31
5.	TTH Torun	40	11	3	26	99:193	25
6.	Naprzód Janów	40	5	1	34	99:218	11

== Qualification round ==
	Club	GP	W	T	L	Goals	Pts
7.	Stocznowiec Gdansk	24	20	1	3	147:73	41
8.	KS Cracovia	24	19	1	4	132:60	39
9.	Polonia Bytom	24	16	0	8	110:80	32
10.	MKH Tychy	24	8	1	15	91:161	17
11.	BTH Bydgoszcz	24	8	0	16	79:99	16
12.	KTH Krynica	24	7	1	16	92:111	15
13.	SMS Sosnowiec	24	3	2	19	78:145	8

== Playoffs ==
Quarter-finals
Podhale Nowy Targ	2
KS Cracovia	1
STS Sanok	2
TTH Torun	1
KKH Katowice	2
Stocznowiec Gdansk	1
Unia Oświęcim	2
Naprzód Janów	0

Semi-finals
Podhale Nowy Targ	3
STS Sanok	2
KKH Katowice	1
Unia Oświęcim	3

Final
Podhale Nowy Targ	4
Unia Oświęcim	2
Third place
KKH Katowice	3
STS Sanok	1
