= 1995–96 Polska Liga Hokejowa season =

Polish ice hockey season

The 1995–96 Polska Liga Hokejowa season was the 61st season of the Polska Liga Hokejowa, the top level of ice hockey in Poland. 12 teams participated in the league, and Podhale Nowy Targ won the championship.

== Final round ==
| | Club | GP | W | T | L | Goals | Pts |
|---|---|---|---|---|---|---|---|
| 1. | Unia Oświęcim | 20 | 19 | 0 | 1 | 109:50 | 38 |
| 2. | Podhale Nowy Targ | 20 | 16 | 0 | 4 | 114:66 | 32 |
| 3. | KKH Katowice | 20 | 8 | 1 | 11 | 77:73 | 17 |
| 4. | TTH Torun | 20 | 7 | 1 | 12 | 59:73 | 15 |
| 5. | STS Sanok | 20 | 6 | 0 | 14 | 76:105 | 12 |
| 6. | SMS Sosnowiec | 20 | 3 | 0 | 17 | 48:116 | 6 |

== Qualification round ==
| | Club | GP | W | T | L | Goals | Pts |
|---|---|---|---|---|---|---|---|
| 7. | Naprzód Janów | 20 | 16 | 3 | 1 | 122:44 | 35 |
| 8. | Stoczniowiec Gdansk | 20 | 15 | 1 | 4 | 106:59 | 31 |
| 9. | Tysovia Tychy | 20 | 11 | 0 | 9 | 87:81 | 22 |
| 10. | KS Cracovia | 20 | 4 | 4 | 12 | 48:96 | 12 |
| 11. | BTH Bydgoszcz | 20 | 5 | 1 | 14 | 60:95 | 11 |
| 12. | Polonia Bytom | 20 | 3 | 3 | 14 | 59:107 | 9 |

== Playoffs ==
Quarter-finals
Podhale Nowy Targ | 2
Stoczniowiec Gdansk | 0
KKH Katowice | 1
Naprzód Janów | 2
Unia Oświęcim | 2
MKH Tysovia Tychy | 0
TTH Torun | 2
STS Sanok | 0

Semi-finals
Podhale Nowy Targ | 3
Naprzód Janów | 1
Unia Oświęcim | 3
TTH Torun | 2

Final
Podhale Nowy Targ | 3
Unia Oświęcim | 0
Third place
TTH Torun | 2
Naprzód Janów | 1
