= 1999–2000 Polska Liga Hokejowa season =

Polish ice hockey season

The 1999–2000 Polska Liga Hokejowa season was the 65th season of the Polska Liga Hokejowa, the top level of ice hockey in Poland. Eight teams participated in the league, and Unia Oswiecim won the championship.

== Regular season ==
	Club	W	L	Goals	Pts
1.	Unia Oświęcim	36	6	198:71	72
2.	Podhale Nowy Targ	27	15	178:122	55
3.	KTH Krynica	27	15	160:94	55
4.	GKS Tychy	25	17	153:108	51
5.	SKH Sanok	22	20	130:131	44
6.	Stocznowiec Gdansk	14	28	116:175	29
7.	KKH Katowice	13	29	119:139	28
8.	KS Cracovia	4	38	81:295	9

== Playoffs ==
Quarter-finals
Unia Oświęcim	3
KS Cracovia	0
GKS Tychy	1
SKH Sanok	3
Podhale Nowy Targ	3
KKH Katowice	1
KTH Krynica	3
Stocznowiec Gdansk	1

Semi-finals
Unia Oświęcim	3
SKH Sanok	0
Podhale Nowy Targ	3
KTH Krynica	0

Final
Unia Oświęcim	4
Podhale Nowy Targ	1
Third place
KTH Krynica	3
SKH Sanok	1
