= 2024–25 Polska Hokej Liga season =

Polska Hokej Liga season

2024–25 Polska Hokej Liga
- League: Polska Hokej Liga
- Sport: Ice hockey
- Duration: 13 September 2024 – 7 April 2025
- Games: Regular season: 180; Postseason: 39
- Teams: 9

Regular season
- Best record: GKS Tychy
- Runners-up: GKS Katowice

Playoffs
- Finals champions: GKS Tychy
- Runners-up: GKS Katowice

Polska Hokej Liga seasons
- ← 2023–24 2025–26 →

The 2024–25 Polska Hokej Liga season was the 90th season of professional ice hockey in Poland. The regular season ran from 13 September 2024 to 16 February 2025. The GKS Tychy finished atop the standings. The postseason ran from 22 February to 7 April, 2025. The GKS Tychy defeated the GKS Katowice 4 games to 3 for the league championship.

== Teams ==
2024–25 Polska Hokej Liga team map

Team	City	Arena	Coach
JKH GKS Jastrzębie	Jastrzębie-Zdrój	Jastor Arena	(Poland) Rafał Bernacki
GKS Katowice	Katowice	Spodek	(Poland) Jacek Płachta
Cracovia	Kraków	Lodowisko im. Adama „Rocha” Kowalskiego	(Poland) Krystian Dziubinski
Podhale Nowy Targ	Nowy Targ	Miejska Hala Lodowa	(Canada) Dave Allison (Canada) Marek Batkiewicz (Latvia) Aleksandrs Beļavskis
TH Unia Oświęcim	Oświęcim	Hala Lodowa Oświęcim	(Finland) Antti Karhula (Slovakia) Nik Zupančič
STS Sanok	Sanok	Arena Sanok	(Finland) Elmo Aittola
KH Zagłębie Sosnowiec	Sosnowiec	Stadion Zimowy	(Finland) Matias Lehtonen (Poland) Piotr Sarnik
TKH Toruń	Toruń	Tor-Tor Arena	(Finland) Juha Nurminen
GKS Tychy	Tychy	Stadion Zimowy w Tychach	(Finland) Pekka Tirkkonen

== Regular season ==
=== Standings ===
Pos	Team	Pld	W	OTW	OTL	L	GF	GA	GD	Pts	Qualification
1	GKS Tychy	40	28	4	3	5	189	83	+106	95	Qualification to Quarterfinals
2	GKS Katowice	40	24	4	4	8	156	84	+72	84	Qualification to Quarterfinals
3	TH Unia Oświęcim	40	25	2	3	10	166	107	+59	82	Qualification to Quarterfinals
4	JKH GKS Jastrzębie	40	22	5	1	12	162	101	+61	77	Qualification to Quarterfinals
5	TKH Toruń	40	17	4	5	14	132	114	+18	64	Qualification to Quarterfinals
6	Cracovia	40	18	1	2	19	157	135	+22	58	Qualification to Quarterfinals
7	KH Zagłębie Sosnowiec	40	16	2	4	18	133	123	+10	56	Qualification to Quarterfinals
8	STS Sanok	40	6	1	0	33	74	189	−115	20	Qualification to Quarterfinals
9	Podhale Nowy Targ	40	1	0	1	38	54	287	−233	4	

Source: polskihokej.eu
Rules for classification: 1) Points; 2) Head-to-head points.

=== Statistics ===
==== Scoring leaders ====
Player	Team	Pos	GP	G	A	Pts	PIM
(Sweden) Johan Lundgren	Cracovia	C/W	39	27	36	63	10
(Poland) Damian Tyczyński	KH Zagłębie Sosnowiec	C	39	17	37	54	16
(Finland) Rasmus Heljanko	GKS Tychy	LW	38	24	28	52	16
(Sweden) Tim Wahlgren	Cracovia	C/W	39	16	36	52	14
(Poland) Damian Kapica	Cracovia	RW	38	18	32	50	34
(Finland) Joona Monto	GKS Tychy	C	37	14	36	50	12
(Finland) Hannu Kuru	JKH GKS Jastrzębie	C/W	40	13	37	50	8
(Poland) Patryk Krężołek	KH Zagłębie Sosnowiec	F	40	28	21	49	22
(Finland) Henry Karjalainen	TH Unia Oświęcim	LW/RW	39	16	32	48	18
(Finland) Teemu Pulkkinen	JKH GKS Jastrzębie	RW	38	26	19	45	2
(Czech Republic) Martin Kasperlík	JKH GKS Jastrzębie	F	37	17	28	45	24
(Finland) Alan Łyszczarczyk	GKS Tychy	C/W	40	12	33	45	14

==== Leading goaltenders ====
The following goaltenders led the league in goals against average, provided that they have played at least 1/3 of their team's minutes.

Player	Team	GP	TOI	W	L	GA	SO	SV%	GAA
(Finland) Vilho Heikkinen	JKH GKS Jastrzębie	18	1,067	13	5	39	2	.909	2.19
(Poland) John Murray	GKS Katowice	28	1,640	18	9	61	4	.923	2.23
(Poland) Tomáš Fučík	GKS Tychy	29	1,750	21	8	66	2	.921	2.26
(Sweden) Linus Lundin	TH Unia Oświęcim	34	1,924	22	11	74	3	.927	2.31
(Sweden) Anton Svensson	TKH Toruń	23	1,357	13	10	56	6	.912	2.48

== Playoffs ==
=== Championship ===
Quarterfinals (best-of-7)
1	GKS Tychy	6	13	5	5	–	–	–
8	STS Sanok	0	1	2	1	–	–	–
2	GKS Katowice	8	7	3*	4	–	–	–
7	KH Zagłębie Sosnowiec	0	2	2	0	–	–	–
(Pairings are re-seeded after the first round)
3	TH Unia Oświęcim	3*	5	5	2*	–	–	–
6	Cracovia	2	2	2	1	–	–	–
4	JKH GKS Jastrzębie	5	5	1	1	4	5	–
5	TKH Toruń	1	3	2	2**	1	3	–

Semifinals (best-of-7)
1	GKS Tychy	4	3	3	2	4	2*	–
4	JKH GKS Jastrzębie	1	1	5	4	0	1	–
2	GKS Katowice	1	2*	4	2	2	4	–
3	TH Unia Oświęcim	4	1	1	3	1	2	–

Championship (best-of-7)
1	GKS Tychy	2	5	0	3	1	0	4
2	GKS Katowice	1	1	2	1	3	3	2
Third place
3	TH Unia Oświęcim	1	1	–
5	JKH GKS Jastrzębie	2*	2*	–

Note: * denotes overtime
Note: ** denotes overtime and shootout
