= 2000–01 Polska Liga Hokejowa season =

Polish ice hockey season

The 2000–01 Polska Liga Hokejowa season was the 66th season of the Polska Liga Hokejowa, the top level of ice hockey in Poland. Eight teams participated in the league, and Unia Oswiecim won the championship.

== Regular season ==
	Club	GP	W	OTW	OTL	L	Goals	Pts
1.	Unia Oświęcim	42	37	0	0	5	219:87	74
2.	GKS Katowice	42	28	0	2	12	154:112	58
3.	GKS Tychy	42	21	3	0	18	145:124	48
4.	Polonia Bytom	42	19	2	2	19	128:130	44
5.	KTH Krynica	42	19	2	1	20	145:150	43
6.	Podhale Nowy Targ	42	13	0	3	26	112:165	29
7.	Stoczniowiec Gdansk	42	9	3	2	26	127:191	26
8.	SKH Sanok	42	11	1	1	29	122:193	25

== Playoffs ==
Quarter-finals
Unia Oświęcim	3
SKH Sanok	0
Polonia Bytom	3
KTH Krynica	2
GKS Katowice	3
Stocznowiec Gdansk	1
GKS Tychy	3
Podhale Nowy Targ	1

Semi-finals
Unia Oświęcim	3
Polonia Bytom	0
GKS Katowice	3
GKS Tychy	1

Final
Unia Oświęcim	4
GKS Katowice	0
Third place
GKS Tychy	0
Polonia Bytom	3
