= TH Unia Oświęcim =

Polish professional ice hockey team

KS Unia Oświęcim
- City: Oświęcim, Poland
- League: Polska Hokej Liga
- Founded: 11 December 1946 (club); 1957 (ice hockey section)
- Home arena: Hala Lodowa Oświęcim
- Colours: Blue, white
- General manager: Mariusz Sibik
- Head coach: Antti Karhula
- Website: unia-oswiecim.pl

Franchise history
- 1957–1999: KS Unia Oświęcim
- 1999–2006: Dwory Unia Oświęcim
- 2006–2009: TH Unia Oświęcim
- 2009–2014: Aksam Unia Oświęcim
- 2014–2015: TH Unia Oświęcim

Klub Sportowy Unia Oświęcim is a professional ice hockey club based in Oświęcim, Poland. The team competes in the Polska Hokej Liga, the highest league in Poland. The team's colors are blue and white.

== History ==
The club was created in 1946, with the ice hockey section being created in 1957. From 1957 to 1999 it was called KS Unia Oświęcim, and from 1999 to 2006, Dwory Unia Oświęcim. Their home ice is the Hala Lodowa MOSiR which can holds 3,500 people.

In June 2020, Eliezer Sherbatov, captain of Israel national team, signed a one-year contract with the team, which plays just a short walk from the site of the Auschwitz concentration camp, where one million Jewish people were killed during the Holocaust. Sherbatov said, "I have a great deal of motivation because it is Auschwitz. I want to win the championship, the Polish Cup and the continental title, and then everyone will know the one who did this is a Jewish–Israeli." His father told him "to work hard, to show his lion’s heart, and to be proud of Israel and show people we are still alive."

== Current roster ==
As of 7 February 2025.

No.	Nat	Player	Pos	S/G	Age	Acquired	Birthplace
5	(Sweden)	Carl Ackered	D	L	35	2023	Stockholm, Sweden
25	(Finland)	Erik Ahopelto	C	L	29	2022	Tampere, Finland
4	(Slovakia)	Peter Bezuška	D	L	32	2015	Bojnice, Slovakia
9	(Belarus)	Roman Dyukov	D	L	30	2022	Minsk, Belarus
61	(Poland)	Krystian Dziubiński (C)	C	L	37	2021	Nowy Targ, Poland
24	(Poland)	Radosław Galant	C	L	35	2024	Krynica, Poland
55	(Finland)	Ville Heikkinen	C	L	31	2023	Helsinki, Finland
36	(Sweden)	Anton Holm	LW	L	35	2024	Nacka, Sweden
92	(Finland)	Lauri Huhdanpää	C	L	30	2024	Tampere, Finland
17	(Finland)	Henry Karjalainen	LW	L	30	2023	Lappeenranta, Finland
26	(Poland)	Marcin Kolusz	D	L	41	2024	Limanowa, Poland
53	(Poland)	Robert Kowalówka	G	L	32	2021	Oświęcim, Poland
12	(Poland)	Sebastian Kowalówka (A)	C	L	39	2016	Oświęcim, Poland
44	(Poland)	Łukasz Krzemień	C	L	29	2019	Bytom, Poland
52	(Sweden)	Christopher Liljewall	C	L	36	2024	Malmö, Sweden
65	(Sweden)	Linus Lundin	G	L	33	2022	Stockholm, Sweden
19	(Poland)	Jakub Łoza	F	L	20	2023	Katowice, Poland
15	(Poland)	Kacper Łukawski	D	L	21	2023	Oświęcim, Poland
10	(Sweden)	Sam Marklund	LW	L	33	2024	Skellefteå, Sweden
18	(Poland)	Miłosz Noworyta (A)	D	L	26	2019	Oświęcim, Poland
21	(Sweden)	Daniel Olsson Trkulja	LW	L	35	2023	Stockholm, Sweden
13	(Poland)	Kacper Prokopiak	D	L	19	2023	Warsaw, Poland
14	(Poland)	Adrian Prusak	F	R	27	2019	Oświęcim, Poland
11	(Poland)	Kamil Sadlocha	C	R	26	2023	Sosnowiec, Poland
57	(Sweden)	Andreas Söderberg	D	L	29	2024	Skellefteå, Sweden
77	(Finland)	Joonas Uimonen	D	L	27	2023	Hämeenlinna, Finland
66	(Finland)	Kalle Valtola	D	L	30	2023	Turku, Finland
63	(Finland)	Jere Vertanen	D	L	27	2024	Jyväskylä, Finland
8	(Poland)	Patryk Wajda	D	L	37	2024	Nowy Targ, Poland

== Achievements ==
- Polish Championship:
  - Champions (9): 1992, 1998, 1999, 2000, 2001, 2002, 2003, 2004, 2024
  - Runners-up (9): 1991, 1993, 1994, 1995, 1996, 1997, 2005, 2020, 2022
  - 3rd place (3): 2011, 2012, 2023
- Polish Cup:
  - Winners (2): 2000, 2002

== Season-by-season ==
Season	League	Playoff Rank
1990–91	I liga	2
1991–92	I liga	Playoff champions
1992–93	I liga	2
1993–94	I liga	2
1994–95	I liga	2
1995–96	I liga	2
1996–97	I liga	2
1997–98	I liga	Playoff champions
1998–99	I liga	Playoff champions
1999–2000	PLH	Playoff champions
2000–01	PLH	Playoff champions
2001–02	PLH	Playoff champions
2002–03	PLH	Playoff champions
2003–04	PLH	Playoff champions
2004–05	PLH	2
2005–06	PLH	4
2006–07	PLH	7
2007–08	PLH	10 (relegated)
2008–09	I liga	1 (promoted)
2009–10	PLH	6
2010–11	PLH	3
2011–12	PLH	3
2012–13	PLH	6
2013–14	PHL	4
2014–15	PHL	6
