= Ice hockey at the 1988 Winter Olympics – Rosters =

The ice hockey team rosters at the 1988 Winter Olympics consisted of the following players:

== Austria ==
Head coach: (Czechoslovakia) Luděk Bukač

Assistant coach: (United States) Bill Gilligan

No.	Pos.	Name	Height	Weight	Birthdate	Team
12	F	Thomas Cijan	5 ft 10 in (178 cm)	165 lb (75 kg)	December 29, 1960 (aged 27)	(Austria) Klagenfurter AC
8	D	Konrad Dorn	6 ft 0 in (183 cm)	194 lb (88 kg)	October 29, 1962 (aged 25)	(Austria) Innsbrucker EV
10	F	Kelvin Greenbank	6 ft 0 in (183 cm)	185 lb (84 kg)	November 17, 1955 (aged 32)	(Austria) VEU Feldkirch
18	F	Kurt Harand (C)	6 ft 1 in (185 cm)	201 lb (91 kg)	September 11, 1957 (aged 30)	(Austria) Wiener EV
14	D	Bernard Hutz	5 ft 10 in (178 cm)	176 lb (80 kg)	April 30, 1961 (aged 26)	(Austria) Salzburger EC
26	F	Werner Kerth	5 ft 9 in (175 cm)	185 lb (84 kg)	December 7, 1966 (aged 21)	(Austria) Innsbrucker EV
4	D	Gert Kompajn	5 ft 11 in (180 cm)	196 lb (89 kg)	September 13, 1960 (aged 27)	(Austria) Klagenfurter AC
5	F	Rudolf König	6 ft 0 in (183 cm)	176 lb (80 kg)	April 25, 1957 (aged 30)	(Austria) Klagenfurter AC
27	F	Günter Koren	6 ft 1 in (185 cm)	185 lb (84 kg)	July 30, 1962 (aged 25)	(Austria) Wiener EV
11	F	Edward Lebler	5 ft 10 in (178 cm)	181 lb (82 kg)	May 20, 1958 (aged 29)	(Austria) Klagenfurter AC
1	G	Robert Mack	5 ft 11 in (180 cm)	198 lb (90 kg)	July 1, 1959 (aged 28)	(Austria) Klagenfurter AC
5	F	Manfred Mühr	5 ft 9 in (175 cm)	176 lb (80 kg)	May 31, 1967 (aged 20)	(Austria) Klagenfurter AC
19	D	Martin Platzer	6 ft 2 in (188 cm)	194 lb (88 kg)	September 24, 1963 (aged 24)	(Austria) Innsbrucker EV
17	F	Herbert Pöck	5 ft 10 in (178 cm)	181 lb (82 kg)	March 8, 1957 (aged 30)	(Austria) Klagenfurter AC
20	F	Gerhard Puschnik	5 ft 9 in (175 cm)	185 lb (84 kg)	October 16, 1966 (aged 21)	(Austria) VEU Feldkirch
15	F	Peter Raffl	6 ft 0 in (183 cm)	183 lb (83 kg)	February 2, 1960 (aged 28)	(Austria) Villacher SV
7	D	Robin Sadler	6 ft 2 in (188 cm)	181 lb (82 kg)	March 31, 1955 (aged 32)	(Austria) Wiener EV
23	G	Andreas Salat	6 ft 1 in (185 cm)	196 lb (89 kg)	June 5, 1964 (aged 23)	(Austria) Wiener EV
24	D	Michael Shea	5 ft 11 in (180 cm)	196 lb (89 kg)	June 4, 1961 (aged 26)	(Austria) EHC Lustenau
25	G	Brian Stankiewicz	5 ft 11 in (180 cm)	176 lb (80 kg)	June 20, 1956 (aged 31)	(Austria) Innsbrucker EV
6	D	Johann Sulzer	5 ft 10 in (178 cm)	183 lb (83 kg)	December 22, 1959 (aged 28)	(Austria) Klagenfurter AC
21	F	Silvester Szybisti	-	-	January 1, 1962 (aged 26)	(Austria) Salzburger EC
22	F	Peter Znenahlik	5 ft 9 in (175 cm)	181 lb (82 kg)	December 9, 1962 (aged 25)	(Austria) Salzburger EC

== Canada ==
Head coach: Dave King

Assistant coach: Guy Charron, George Kingston, Tom Watt

No.	Pos.	Name	Height	Weight	Birthdate	Team
1	G	Sean Burke	6 ft 4 in (193 cm)	209 lb (95 kg)	January 29, 1967 (aged 21)	-
2	D	Tim Watters	5 ft 11 in (180 cm)	185 lb (84 kg)	July 25, 1959 (aged 28)	(Canada) Winnipeg Jets
2	D	Trent Yawney (C)	6 ft 3 in (191 cm)	194 lb (88 kg)	September 29, 1965 (aged 22)	-
3	D	Serge Roy	5 ft 9 in (175 cm)	181 lb (82 kg)	June 25, 1962 (aged 25)	(Sweden) Skellefteå HC
4	D	Tony Stiles	5 ft 11 in (180 cm)	207 lb (94 kg)	August 12, 1959 (aged 28)	-
7	F	Wally Schreiber	5 ft 10 in (178 cm)	176 lb (80 kg)	April 15, 1962 (aged 25)	-
8	F	Brian Bradley	5 ft 10 in (178 cm)	181 lb (82 kg)	January 21, 1965 (aged 23)	(Canada) Moncton Golden Flames
10	F	Gordon Sherven	6 ft 0 in (183 cm)	183 lb (83 kg)	August 21, 1963 (aged 24)	(United States) Hartford Whalers
11	F	Steve Tambellini	6 ft 0 in (183 cm)	185 lb (84 kg)	May 14, 1958 (aged 29)	(Canada) Vancouver Canucks
12	F	Serge Boisvert	5 ft 10 in (178 cm)	187 lb (85 kg)	June 1, 1959 (aged 28)	(Canada) Sherbrooke Canadiens
13	F	Ken Yaremchuk	5 ft 10 in (178 cm)	183 lb (83 kg)	January 1, 1964 (aged 24)	(Canada) Toronto Maple Leafs
14	F	Marc Habscheid	6 ft 1 in (185 cm)	179 lb (81 kg)	March 1, 1963 (aged 24)	(United States) Minnesota North Stars
15	F	Bob Joyce	6 ft 0 in (183 cm)	194 lb (88 kg)	July 11, 1966 (aged 21)	(United States) North Dakota Fighting Sioux
16	F	Merlin Malinowski	6 ft 0 in (183 cm)	190 lb (86 kg)	September 25, 1958 (aged 29)	(Switzerland) SC Langnau
18	F	Claude Vilgrain	6 ft 1 in (185 cm)	205 lb (93 kg)	March 1, 1963 (aged 24)	-
19	F	Vaughn Karpan	6 ft 0 in (183 cm)	172 lb (78 kg)	June 20, 1961 (aged 26)	-
21	D	Randy Gregg	6 ft 0 in (183 cm)	209 lb (95 kg)	February 19, 1956 (aged 31)	(Canada) Edmonton Oilers
23	D	Chris Felix	5 ft 11 in (180 cm)	187 lb (85 kg)	May 27, 1964 (aged 23)	-
24	F	Jim Peplinski	6 ft 3 in (191 cm)	209 lb (95 kg)	October 24, 1960 (aged 27)	(Canada) Calgary Flames
25	D	Zarley Zalapski	6 ft 1 in (185 cm)	225 lb (102 kg)	April 22, 1968 (aged 19)	-
35	G	Andy Moog	5 ft 9 in (175 cm)	170 lb (77 kg)	February 18, 1960 (aged 27)	(Canada) Edmonton Oilers

== Czechoslovakia ==
Head coach: Ján Starši

Assistant coach: František Pospíśil

No.	Pos.	Name	Height	Weight	Birthdate	Team
1	G	Petr Bříza	6 ft 0 in (183 cm)	181 lb (82 kg)	December 9, 1964 (aged 23)	(Czechoslovakia) TJ Motor Česke Budějovice
2	G	Dominik Hašek	6 ft 0 in (183 cm)	165 lb (75 kg)	January 29, 1965 (aged 23)	(Czechoslovakia) TJ Pardubice
4	D	Miloslav Hořava	5 ft 11 in (180 cm)	192 lb (87 kg)	August 14, 1961 (aged 26)	(Czechoslovakia) TJ Kladno
5	D	Rudolf Suchánek	6 ft 2 in (188 cm)	229 lb (104 kg)	January 27, 1962 (aged 26)	(Czechoslovakia) TJ Motor Česke Budějovice
7	D	Bedřich Ščerban	5 ft 8 in (173 cm)	176 lb (80 kg)	May 31, 1964 (aged 23)	(Czechoslovakia) ASD Dukla Jihlava
8	D	Eduard Uvíra	6 ft 0 in (183 cm)	209 lb (95 kg)	June 12, 1961 (aged 26)	(Czechoslovakia) HC Slovan Bratislava
9	D	Jaroslav Benák	6 ft 0 in (183 cm)	187 lb (85 kg)	April 3, 1962 (aged 25)	(Czechoslovakia) ASD Dukla Jihlava
10	F	Petr Rosol	5 ft 10 in (178 cm)	170 lb (77 kg)	June 20, 1964 (aged 23)	(Czechoslovakia) TJ Litvínov
11	F	Igor Liba	6 ft 0 in (183 cm)	198 lb (90 kg)	November 4, 1960 (aged 27)	(Czechoslovakia) HC Košice
15	F	Jiří Doležal	5 ft 9 in (175 cm)	185 lb (84 kg)	September 22, 1963 (aged 24)	(Czechoslovakia) TJ Sparta Praha
16	D	Antonín Stavjaňa	6 ft 0 in (183 cm)	198 lb (90 kg)	February 10, 1963 (aged 25)	(Czechoslovakia) TJ Gottwaldov
17	F	Vladimír Růžička	6 ft 3 in (191 cm)	216 lb (98 kg)	June 6, 1963 (aged 24)	(Czechoslovakia) HK Dukla Trenčin
19	F	David Volek	6 ft 0 in (183 cm)	185 lb (84 kg)	June 18, 1966 (aged 21)	(Czechoslovakia) TJ Sparta Praha
20	F	Jiří Lála	5 ft 10 in (178 cm)	181 lb (82 kg)	August 21, 1959 (aged 28)	(Czechoslovakia) TJ Motor Česke Budějovice
21	F	Dušan Pašek (C)	6 ft 1 in (185 cm)	201 lb (91 kg)	July 9, 1960 (aged 27)	(Czechoslovakia) HC Slovan Bratislava
22	F	Jiří Šejba	5 ft 10 in (178 cm)	185 lb (84 kg)	July 22, 1962 (aged 25)	(Czechoslovakia) TJ Pardubice
23	F	Petr Vlk	6 ft 2 in (188 cm)	194 lb (88 kg)	January 7, 1964 (aged 24)	(Czechoslovakia) ASD Dukla Jihlava
24	F	Jiří Hrdina	6 ft 0 in (183 cm)	194 lb (88 kg)	January 5, 1958 (aged 30)	(Czechoslovakia) TJ Sparta Praha
25	F	Radim Raděvič	5 ft 10 in (178 cm)	187 lb (85 kg)	December 16, 1966 (aged 21)	(Czechoslovakia) HK Dukla Trenčin
26	F	Oto Haščák	6 ft 1 in (185 cm)	198 lb (90 kg)	January 31, 1964 (aged 24)	(Czechoslovakia) HK Dukla Trenčin
27	F	Rostislav Vlach	6 ft 0 in (183 cm)	203 lb (92 kg)	July 3, 1962 (aged 25)	(Czechoslovakia) TJ Gottwaldov
28	D	Mojmír Božík	5 ft 9 in (175 cm)	185 lb (84 kg)	February 26, 1962 (aged 25)	(Czechoslovakia) HC Košice
26	G	Jaromír Šindel	6 ft 1 in (185 cm)	190 lb (86 kg)	November 30, 1959 (aged 28)	(Czechoslovakia) TJ Sparta Praha

== Finland ==
Head coach: Pentti Matikainen

Assistant coach: Hannu Jortikka

No.	Pos.	Name	Height	Weight	Birthdate	Team
1	G	Sakari Lindfors	5 ft 7 in (170 cm)	154 lb (70 kg)	April 27, 1966 (aged 21)	(Finland) HIFK
2	D	Teppo Numminen	6 ft 1 in (185 cm)	198 lb (90 kg)	July 3, 1968 (aged 19)	(Finland) Tappara
3	D	Timo Blomqvist (C)	5 ft 11 in (180 cm)	201 lb (91 kg)	January 23, 1961 (aged 27)	(Sweden) MoDo Hockey
4	D	Jyrki Lumme	6 ft 1 in (185 cm)	214 lb (97 kg)	July 16, 1966 (aged 21)	(Finland) Ilves
6	D	Arto Ruotanen	5 ft 11 in (180 cm)	183 lb (83 kg)	April 11, 1961 (aged 26)	(Sweden) HV71
7	D	Simo Saarinen	5 ft 10 in (178 cm)	179 lb (81 kg)	February 14, 1963 (aged 25)	(Finland) HIFK
9	D	Kari Eloranta	6 ft 2 in (188 cm)	201 lb (91 kg)	February 29, 1956 (aged 31)	(Switzerland) HC Lugano
10	F	Timo Susi	5 ft 10 in (178 cm)	176 lb (80 kg)	January 25, 1959 (aged 29)	(Finland) Tappara
11	F	Kai Suikkanen	6 ft 2 in (188 cm)	209 lb (95 kg)	June 29, 1959 (aged 28)	(Finland) Kärpät
13	F	Jari Torkki	5 ft 11 in (180 cm)	183 lb (83 kg)	August 11, 1965 (aged 22)	(Finland) Lukko
14	F	Raimo Helminen	6 ft 0 in (183 cm)	194 lb (88 kg)	March 11, 1964 (aged 23)	(Finland) Ilves
15	F	Iiro Järvi	6 ft 2 in (188 cm)	201 lb (91 kg)	March 23, 1965 (aged 22)	(Finland) HIFK
16	D	Jukka Virtanen	6 ft 0 in (183 cm)	187 lb (85 kg)	July 15, 1959 (aged 28)	(Finland) TPS
17	F	Erkki Laine	5 ft 9 in (175 cm)	172 lb (78 kg)	September 13, 1957 (aged 30)	(Sweden) Färjestad BK
18	F	Pekka Tuomisto	6 ft 0 in (183 cm)	185 lb (84 kg)	December 29, 1960 (aged 27)	(Finland) HIFK
19	G	Jarmo Myllys	5 ft 9 in (175 cm)	172 lb (78 kg)	May 29, 1965 (aged 22)	(Finland) Lukko
20	F	Janne Ojanen	6 ft 2 in (188 cm)	203 lb (92 kg)	April 9, 1968 (aged 19)	(Finland) Tappara
21	F	Erkki Lehtonen	5 ft 10 in (178 cm)	176 lb (80 kg)	January 9, 1957 (aged 31)	(Finland) Tappara
24	F	Reijo Mikkolainen	5 ft 11 in (180 cm)	190 lb (86 kg)	May 14, 1964 (aged 23)	(Finland) Tappara
26	F	Esa Keskinen	5 ft 10 in (178 cm)	194 lb (88 kg)	February 3, 1965 (aged 23)	(Finland) TPS
27	F	Kari Laitinen	5 ft 10 in (178 cm)	181 lb (82 kg)	April 9, 1964 (aged 23)	(Finland) HIFK
29	D	Reijo Ruotsalainen	5 ft 8 in (173 cm)	165 lb (75 kg)	April 1, 1960 (aged 27)	(Finland) Kärpät
30	G	Jukka Tammi	5 ft 11 in (180 cm)	172 lb (78 kg)	April 10, 1962 (aged 25)	(Finland) Ilves

== France ==
Head coach: (Sweden) Kjell Larsson

No.	Pos.	Name	Height	Weight	Birthdate	Team
1	G	Daniel Maric	5 ft 9 in (175 cm)	165 lb (75 kg)	June 11, 1957 (aged 30)	(France) Français Volants Paris
4	D	Pierre Schmitt	5 ft 11 in (180 cm)	179 lb (81 kg)	December 19, 1965 (aged 22)	-
5	D	Steven Woodburn	6 ft 1 in (185 cm)	198 lb (90 kg)	October 24, 1963 (aged 24)	(France) Gap
7	F	Guy Dupuis	5 ft 9 in (175 cm)	165 lb (75 kg)	September 4, 1957 (aged 30)	(France) Mont-Blanc
9	F	André Peloffy (C)	5 ft 8 in (173 cm)	168 lb (76 kg)	December 24, 1951 (aged 36)	(France) Français Volants Paris
10	F	Pierre Pousse	5 ft 11 in (180 cm)	176 lb (80 kg)	February 27, 1966 (aged 21)	(France) Mont-Blanc
11	F	Peter Almásy	5 ft 11 in (180 cm)	185 lb (84 kg)	February 11, 1961 (aged 27)	(France) Français Volants Paris
12	F	Philippe Bozon	5 ft 11 in (180 cm)	192 lb (87 kg)	November 30, 1966 (aged 21)	(France) Mont-Blanc
13	F	Derek Haas	6 ft 0 in (183 cm)	176 lb (80 kg)	May 1, 1955 (aged 32)	(France) Villard-de-Lans
14	D	Denis Perez	6 ft 2 in (188 cm)	203 lb (92 kg)	April 25, 1964 (aged 23)	(France) Français Volants Paris
16	D	Jean-Philippe Lemoine	6 ft 4 in (193 cm)	229 lb (104 kg)	September 11, 1964 (aged 23)	(France) Grenoble
17	F	Paulin Bordeleau	5 ft 9 in (175 cm)	181 lb (82 kg)	January 29, 1953 (aged 35)	(France) Mont-Blanc
18	D	Jean-Christophe Lerondeau	6 ft 1 in (185 cm)	183 lb (83 kg)	June 27, 1963 (aged 24)	(France) Français Volants Paris
19	D	Stéphane Botteri	5 ft 9 in (175 cm)	161 lb (73 kg)	January 27, 1962 (aged 26)	(France) Français Volants Paris
21	F	Christophe Ville	5 ft 11 in (180 cm)	176 lb (80 kg)	June 15, 1963 (aged 24)	(France) Français Volants Paris
22	F	Stéphane Lessard	5 ft 9 in (175 cm)	198 lb (90 kg)	February 2, 1962 (aged 26)	(France) Chamonix
24	D	Michel Leblanc	5 ft 10 in (178 cm)	176 lb (80 kg)	December 17, 1959 (aged 28)	(France) Briançon
25	F	Antoine Richer	6 ft 2 in (188 cm)	196 lb (89 kg)	August 9, 1961 (aged 26)	(France) Français Volants Paris
26	D/F	Christian Pouget	5 ft 11 in (180 cm)	181 lb (82 kg)	January 11, 1966 (aged 22)	(France) Gap
27	F	Franck Pajonkowski	6 ft 5 in (196 cm)	227 lb (103 kg)	January 21, 1964 (aged 24)	(France) Rouen
27	D	François Ouimet	5 ft 11 in (180 cm)	176 lb (80 kg)	October 14, 1951 (aged 36)	-
29	G	Jean-Marc Djian	5 ft 8 in (173 cm)	165 lb (75 kg)	March 29, 1966 (aged 21)	-
30	G	Patrick Foliot	5 ft 7 in (170 cm)	165 lb (75 kg)	March 1, 1964 (aged 23)	-

== Norway ==
Head coach: (Sweden) Lennart Åhlberg

Assistant coach: Tore Jobs

No.	Pos.	Name	Height	Weight	Birthdate	Team
1	G	Tommy Skaarberg	6 ft 1 in (185 cm)	187 lb (85 kg)	October 6, 1960 (aged 27)	(Norway) Sparta Sarpsborg
2	G	Jarl Eriksen	5 ft 8 in (173 cm)	159 lb (72 kg)	January 15, 1964 (aged 24)	(Norway) Manglerud
3	D	Petter Salsten	6 ft 3 in (191 cm)	207 lb (94 kg)	March 11, 1965 (aged 22)	(Norway) Furuset
4	D	Åge Ellingsen	6 ft 4 in (193 cm)	209 lb (95 kg)	November 5, 1962 (aged 25)	(Sweden) IF Björklöven
6	D	Truls Kristiansen	5 ft 11 in (180 cm)	183 lb (83 kg)	April 5, 1964 (aged 23)	(Norway) Frisk
7	D	Jørgen Salsten	6 ft 2 in (188 cm)	205 lb (93 kg)	May 4, 1963 (aged 24)	(Norway) Furuset
8	F	Rune Gulliksen	6 ft 3 in (191 cm)	181 lb (82 kg)	January 23, 1963 (aged 25)	(Norway) Stjernen Hockey
9	D	Morgan Andersen	5 ft 10 in (178 cm)	176 lb (80 kg)	April 7, 1966 (aged 21)	(Sweden) IF Sundsvall Hockey
10	F	Geir Hoff	6 ft 0 in (183 cm)	181 lb (82 kg)	February 14, 1965 (aged 22)	(Norway) Vålerenga
11	F	Marius Voigt	5 ft 11 in (180 cm)	179 lb (81 kg)	February 20, 1962 (aged 25)	(Norway) Frisk
12	F	Ørjan Løvdal	5 ft 10 in (178 cm)	172 lb (78 kg)	September 24, 1962 (aged 25)	(Norway) Stjernen Hockey
13	F	Roy Johansen	5 ft 11 in (180 cm)	185 lb (84 kg)	April 27, 1960 (aged 27)	(Norway) Vålerenga
15	F	Lars Bergseng	6 ft 4 in (193 cm)	205 lb (93 kg)	May 14, 1963 (aged 24)	(Norway) Storhamar
16	F	Jarle Friis	5 ft 10 in (178 cm)	168 lb (76 kg)	November 2, 1964 (aged 23)	(Norway) Manglerud
17	F	Sigurd Thinn	6 ft 0 in (183 cm)	179 lb (81 kg)	September 23, 1957 (aged 30)	(Norway) Furuset
18	F	Petter Thoresen	6 ft 0 in (183 cm)	187 lb (85 kg)	July 25, 1961 (aged 26)	(Norway) Vålerenga
19	F	Arne Billkvam	5 ft 10 in (178 cm)	201 lb (91 kg)	April 7, 1960 (aged 27)	(Norway) Vålerenga
20	F	Erik Kristiansen	6 ft 0 in (183 cm)	192 lb (87 kg)	March 12, 1961 (aged 26)	(Sweden) IF Björklöven
22	F	Stephen Foyn	5 ft 11 in (180 cm)	185 lb (84 kg)	June 23, 1959 (aged 28)	(Norway) Sparta Sarpsborg
23	D	Kim Søgaard	5 ft 11 in (180 cm)	192 lb (87 kg)	May 16, 1964 (aged 23)	(Norway) Sparta Sarpsborg
24	D	Cato Tom Andersen	5 ft 11 in (180 cm)	190 lb (86 kg)	June 17, 1967 (aged 20)	(Norway) Furuset
25	G	Vern Mott	5 ft 10 in (178 cm)	161 lb (73 kg)	March 26, 1957 (aged 30)	(Norway) Frisk
26	D	Tor Helge Eikeland	6 ft 1 in (185 cm)	196 lb (89 kg)	June 28, 1960 (aged 27)	(Norway) Vålerenga

== Poland ==
Head coach: Leszek Lejczyk

Assistant coach: Jerzy Mruk

No.	Pos.	Name	Height	Weight	Birthdate	Team
1	G	Franciszek Kukla	6 ft 1 in (185 cm)	209 lb (95 kg)	July 16, 1953 (aged 34)	(Poland) Polonia Bytom
2	D	Andrzej Kądziołka	5 ft 11 in (180 cm)	190 lb (86 kg)	October 12, 1960 (aged 27)	(Poland) Polonia Bytom
4	F	Jan Stopczyk	6 ft 0 in (183 cm)	190 lb (86 kg)	September 28, 1958 (aged 29)	(Italy) Fassa
5	D	Marek Cholewa	5 ft 9 in (175 cm)	196 lb (89 kg)	July 1, 1963 (aged 24)	(Poland) Zagłębie Sosnowiec
6	D	Henryk Gruth (C)	6 ft 0 in (183 cm)	198 lb (90 kg)	September 2, 1957 (aged 30)	(Poland) GKS Tychy
7	D	Robert Szopiński	6 ft 1 in (185 cm)	198 lb (90 kg)	February 15, 1961 (aged 26)	(Poland) Podhale Nowy Targ
9	F	Jarosław Morawiecki	5 ft 7 in (170 cm)	176 lb (80 kg)	March 11, 1964 (aged 23)	(Poland) Zagłębie Sosnowiec
10	D/F	Andrzej Świątek	5 ft 9 in (175 cm)	176 lb (80 kg)	January 7, 1958 (aged 30)	(Poland) Zagłębie Sosnowiec
11	F	Krystian Sikorski	5 ft 10 in (178 cm)	163 lb (74 kg)	April 14, 1961 (aged 26)	(Poland) Polonia Bytom
12	F	Mirosław Copija	6 ft 1 in (185 cm)	181 lb (82 kg)	August 1, 1965 (aged 22)	(Poland) GKS Tychy
14	F	Janusz Adamiec	5 ft 9 in (175 cm)	165 lb (75 kg)	April 29, 1962 (aged 25)	(Poland) Naprzód Janów
16	F	Jacek Szopiński	5 ft 10 in (178 cm)	176 lb (80 kg)	January 5, 1964 (aged 24)	(Poland) Podhale Nowy Targ
17	F	Roman Steblecki	6 ft 2 in (188 cm)	172 lb (78 kg)	March 16, 1963 (aged 24)	(Poland) Cracovia Krakow
18	F	Leszek Jachna	5 ft 11 in (180 cm)	161 lb (73 kg)	May 9, 1958 (aged 29)	(Poland) Polonia Bytom
19	F	Jerzy Christ	6 ft 1 in (185 cm)	192 lb (87 kg)	September 15, 1958 (aged 29)	(Poland) Polonia Bytom
20	D	Zbigniew Bryjak	5 ft 10 in (178 cm)	168 lb (76 kg)	May 28, 1965 (aged 22)	(Poland) Polonia Bytom
21	F	Piotr Kwasigroch	5 ft 9 in (175 cm)	163 lb (74 kg)	July 1, 1962 (aged 25)	(Poland) Naprzód Janów
22	F	Ireneusz Pacula	5 ft 11 in (180 cm)	198 lb (90 kg)	November 16, 1966 (aged 21)	(Poland) Naprzód Janów
24	F	Marek Stebnicki	6 ft 0 in (183 cm)	181 lb (82 kg)	November 11, 1965 (aged 22)	(Poland) Polonia Bytom
25	G	Gabriel Samolej	5 ft 10 in (178 cm)	161 lb (73 kg)	June 1, 1961 (aged 26)	(Poland) Podhale Nowy Targ
28	D	Jerzy Potz	5 ft 11 in (180 cm)	187 lb (85 kg)	February 1, 1953 (aged 35)	(Germany) Eintracht Frankfurt
29	F	Krzysztof Podsiadło	5 ft 9 in (175 cm)	187 lb (85 kg)	February 16, 1962 (aged 25)	(Poland) Zagłębie Sosnowiec
30	G	Andrzej Hanisz	6 ft 0 in (183 cm)	163 lb (74 kg)	February 3, 1962 (aged 26)	(Poland) Naprzód Janów

== Soviet Union ==
Head coach: Viktor Tikhonov

Assistant coach: Igor Dmitriev

No.	Pos.	Name	Height	Weight	Birthdate	Team
1	G	Sergei Mylnikov	5 ft 10 in (178 cm)	172 lb (78 kg)	October 6, 1958 (aged 29)	(Soviet Union) Traktor Chelyabinsk
2	D	Viacheslav Fetisov (C)	6 ft 0 in (183 cm)	218 lb (99 kg)	April 20, 1958 (aged 29)	(Soviet Union) CSKA Moskva
4	D	Igor Stelnov	6 ft 0 in (183 cm)	209 lb (95 kg)	February 12, 1963 (aged 25)	(Soviet Union) CSKA Moskva
5	D	Alexei Gusarov	6 ft 1 in (185 cm)	198 lb (90 kg)	July 8, 1964 (aged 23)	(Soviet Union) CSKA Moskva
6	D	Ilya Byakin	5 ft 10 in (178 cm)	192 lb (87 kg)	February 2, 1963 (aged 25)	(Soviet Union) Avtomobilist Sverdlovsk
7	D	Alexei Kasatonov	6 ft 1 in (185 cm)	196 lb (89 kg)	October 14, 1959 (aged 28)	(Soviet Union) CSKA Moskva
9	F	Vladimir Krutov	5 ft 9 in (175 cm)	194 lb (88 kg)	June 1, 1960 (aged 27)	(Soviet Union) CSKA Moskva
10	F	Alexander Mogilny	6 ft 0 in (183 cm)	209 lb (95 kg)	February 18, 1969 (aged 18)	(Soviet Union) CSKA Moskva
11	F	Igor Larionov	5 ft 9 in (175 cm)	172 lb (78 kg)	December 3, 1960 (aged 27)	(Soviet Union) CSKA Moskva
12	D	Sergei Starikov	5 ft 10 in (178 cm)	225 lb (102 kg)	December 4, 1958 (aged 29)	(Soviet Union) CSKA Moskva
13	F	Valeri Kamensky	6 ft 1 in (185 cm)	196 lb (89 kg)	April 18, 1966 (aged 21)	(Soviet Union) CSKA Moskva
15	F	Andrei Khomutov	5 ft 10 in (178 cm)	181 lb (82 kg)	April 21, 1961 (aged 26)	(Soviet Union) CSKA Moskva
16	F	Sergei Svetlov	6 ft 2 in (188 cm)	194 lb (88 kg)	January 17, 1961 (aged 27)	(Soviet Union) Dynamo Moskva
20	G	Yevgeni Belosheikin	5 ft 10 in (178 cm)	179 lb (81 kg)	April 17, 1966 (aged 21)	(Soviet Union) CSKA Moskva
21	F	Alexander Chernykh	6 ft 0 in (183 cm)	181 lb (82 kg)	September 12, 1965 (aged 22)	(Soviet Union) Khimik Voskresensk
22	F	Alexander Kozhevnikov	6 ft 3 in (191 cm)	194 lb (88 kg)	September 21, 1958 (aged 29)	(Soviet Union) Krylya Sovetov Moskva
23	F	Andrei Lomakin	5 ft 9 in (175 cm)	174 lb (79 kg)	April 4, 1964 (aged 23)	(Soviet Union) Dynamo Moskva
24	F	Sergei Makarov	5 ft 11 in (180 cm)	183 lb (83 kg)	June 19, 1958 (aged 29)	(Soviet Union) CSKA Moskva
25	F	Sergei Yashin	5 ft 11 in (180 cm)	205 lb (93 kg)	March 6, 1962 (aged 25)	(Soviet Union) Dynamo Moskva
27	F	Vyacheslav Bykov	5 ft 8 in (173 cm)	203 lb (92 kg)	July 24, 1960 (aged 27)	(Soviet Union) Dynamo Moskva
29	D	Igor Kravchuk	6 ft 1 in (185 cm)	205 lb (93 kg)	September 13, 1966 (aged 21)	(Soviet Union) CSKA Moskva
30	F	Anatoli Semenov	6 ft 2 in (188 cm)	190 lb (86 kg)	March 5, 1962 (aged 25)	(Soviet Union) Dynamo Moskva
30	G	Vitālijs Samoilovs	5 ft 11 in (180 cm)	174 lb (79 kg)	April 19, 1962 (aged 25)	(Soviet Union) Dinamo Riga

== Sweden ==
Head coach: Tommy Sandlin

Assistant coach: Curt Lindström

No.	Pos.	Name	Height	Weight	Birthdate	Team
1	G	Peter Lindmark	5 ft 11 in (180 cm)	179 lb (81 kg)	November 8, 1956 (aged 31)	(Sweden) Färjestad BK
2	D	Anders Eldebrink	6 ft 0 in (183 cm)	190 lb (86 kg)	December 11, 1960 (aged 27)	(Sweden) Södertälje SK
3	D	Lars Ivarsson	5 ft 10 in (178 cm)	192 lb (87 kg)	October 12, 1963 (aged 24)	(Sweden) Brynäs IF
4	F	Thom Eklund	6 ft 0 in (183 cm)	185 lb (84 kg)	October 28, 1958 (aged 29)	(Sweden) Södertälje SK
5	D	Mats Kihlström	6 ft 1 in (185 cm)	198 lb (90 kg)	January 3, 1964 (aged 24)	(Sweden) Södertälje SK
6	D	Lars Karlsson	5 ft 10 in (178 cm)	176 lb (80 kg)	June 28, 1960 (aged 27)	(Sweden) IF Björklöven
7	D	Tommy Samuelsson	5 ft 10 in (178 cm)	165 lb (75 kg)	January 12, 1960 (aged 28)	(Sweden) Färjestad BK
9	F	Thomas Rundqvist (C)	6 ft 3 in (191 cm)	196 lb (89 kg)	May 4, 1960 (aged 27)	(Sweden) Färjestad BK
11	F	Jens Öhling	6 ft 0 in (183 cm)	196 lb (89 kg)	April 3, 1962 (aged 25)	(Sweden) Djurgårdens IF
12	F	Mikael Andersson	6 ft 2 in (188 cm)	194 lb (88 kg)	July 6, 1959 (aged 28)	(Sweden) IF Björklöven
14	F	Michael Hjälm	6 ft 1 in (185 cm)	183 lb (83 kg)	March 23, 1963 (aged 24)	(Sweden) MoDo Hockey
15	F	Ulf Sandström	6 ft 0 in (183 cm)	185 lb (84 kg)	April 24, 1967 (aged 20)	(Sweden) MoDo Hockey
18	F	Jonas Bergqvist	6 ft 0 in (183 cm)	203 lb (92 kg)	September 26, 1962 (aged 25)	(Sweden) Leksands IF
19	D	Peter Andersson	6 ft 0 in (183 cm)	181 lb (82 kg)	March 2, 1962 (aged 25)	(Sweden) IF Björklöven
20	F	Bo Berglund	5 ft 10 in (178 cm)	181 lb (82 kg)	April 6, 1955 (aged 32)	(Sweden) AIK
21	F	Lars-Gunnar Pettersson	6 ft 0 in (183 cm)	185 lb (84 kg)	April 8, 1960 (aged 27)	(Sweden) Luleå HF
22	F	Håkan Södergren	5 ft 9 in (175 cm)	176 lb (80 kg)	June 14, 1959 (aged 28)	(Sweden) Djurgårdens IF
23	F	Peter Eriksson	6 ft 5 in (196 cm)	225 lb (102 kg)	July 12, 1965 (aged 22)	(Sweden) HV71
25	F	Mikael Johansson	5 ft 10 in (178 cm)	192 lb (87 kg)	June 12, 1966 (aged 21)	(Sweden) Djurgårdens IF
26	F	Lars Molin	6 ft 0 in (183 cm)	176 lb (80 kg)	May 7, 1956 (aged 31)	(Sweden) MoDo Hockey
27	D	Thomas Eriksson	6 ft 2 in (188 cm)	196 lb (89 kg)	October 16, 1959 (aged 28)	(Sweden) Djurgårdens IF
30	G	Anders Bergman	5 ft 10 in (178 cm)	165 lb (75 kg)	August 6, 1963 (aged 24)	(Sweden) MoDo Hockey
35	G	Peter Åslin	6 ft 0 in (183 cm)	185 lb (84 kg)	September 21, 1962 (aged 25)	(Sweden) Leksands IF

== Switzerland ==
Head coach: Simon Schenk

Assistant coach: Heinz Huggenberger

No.	Pos.	Name	Height	Weight	Birthdate	Team
1	G	Olivier Anken	5 ft 5 in (165 cm)	161 lb (73 kg)	February 10, 1957 (aged 31)	(Switzerland) EHC Biel-Bienne
2	D	Fausto Mazzoleni	6 ft 0 in (183 cm)	198 lb (90 kg)	December 15, 1960 (aged 27)	(Switzerland) HC Davos
3	D	André Künzi	6 ft 0 in (183 cm)	187 lb (85 kg)	January 10, 1967 (aged 21)	(Switzerland) SC Bern
4	D	Andreas Ritsch	5 ft 11 in (180 cm)	185 lb (84 kg)	June 23, 1961 (aged 26)	(Switzerland) HC Lugano
8	F	Gil Montandon	6 ft 1 in (185 cm)	205 lb (93 kg)	April 28, 1965 (aged 22)	(Switzerland) HC Fribourg-Gottéron
10	F	Pietro Cunti	5 ft 11 in (180 cm)	181 lb (82 kg)	September 3, 1962 (aged 25)	(Switzerland) SC Bern
12	D/F	Urs Burkart	6 ft 3 in (191 cm)	203 lb (92 kg)	January 9, 1963 (aged 25)	(Switzerland) EV Zug
13	F	Thomas Vrabec	6 ft 0 in (183 cm)	212 lb (96 kg)	October 22, 1966 (aged 21)	(Switzerland) HC Lugano
14	D	Patrice Brasey	6 ft 2 in (188 cm)	190 lb (86 kg)	January 28, 1964 (aged 24)	(Switzerland) HC Fribourg-Gottéron
15	F/D	Marc Leuenberger	5 ft 11 in (180 cm)	185 lb (84 kg)	July 24, 1962 (aged 25)	(Switzerland) EHC Biel-Bienne
17	D	Jakob Kölliker (C)	6 ft 1 in (185 cm)	190 lb (86 kg)	July 21, 1953 (aged 34)	(Switzerland) HC Ambri-Piotta
18	G	Richard Bucher	6 ft 1 in (185 cm)	185 lb (84 kg)	September 27, 1955 (aged 32)	(Switzerland) HC Davos
19	F	Peter Jaks	6 ft 0 in (183 cm)	231 lb (105 kg)	May 4, 1966 (aged 21)	(Switzerland) HC Lugano
20	D	Bruno Rogger	5 ft 10 in (178 cm)	168 lb (76 kg)	January 19, 1959 (aged 29)	(Switzerland) HC Lugano
21	F	Philipp Neuenschwander	6 ft 2 in (188 cm)	201 lb (91 kg)	December 29, 1964 (aged 23)	(Switzerland) HC Davos
22	F	Fredy Lüthi	6 ft 0 in (183 cm)	176 lb (80 kg)	July 31, 1961 (aged 26)	(Switzerland) HC Lugano
23	F	Felix Hollenstein	6 ft 0 in (183 cm)	201 lb (91 kg)	April 7, 1965 (aged 22)	(Switzerland) EHC Kloten
24	F	Jörg Eberle	6 ft 0 in (183 cm)	198 lb (90 kg)	February 9, 1962 (aged 26)	(Switzerland) HC Lugano
25	F	Roman Wäger	5 ft 11 in (180 cm)	194 lb (88 kg)	February 20, 1963 (aged 24)	(Switzerland) EHC Kloten
27	F	Peter Schlagenhauf	5 ft 11 in (180 cm)	176 lb (80 kg)	March 19, 1960 (aged 27)	(Switzerland) EHC Kloten
28	G	Renato Tosio	5 ft 11 in (180 cm)	176 lb (80 kg)	November 16, 1964 (aged 23)	(Switzerland) SC Bern
29	F	Manuele Celio	5 ft 10 in (178 cm)	181 lb (82 kg)	June 9, 1966 (aged 21)	(Switzerland) EHC Kloten
30	F	Gaëtan Boucher	5 ft 9 in (175 cm)	163 lb (74 kg)	May 5, 1956 (aged 31)	(Switzerland) HC Sierre

== United States ==
Head Coach: Dave Peterson

No.	Pos.	Name	Height	Weight	Birthdate	Team
1	G	Mike Richter	5 ft 11 in (180 cm)	185 lb (84 kg)	September 22, 1966 (aged 21)	(United States) Wisconsin Badgers
2	D	Brian Leetch	6 ft 1 in (185 cm)	187 lb (85 kg)	March 3, 1968 (aged 19)	(United States) Boston College Eagles
3	D	Greg Brown	6 ft 0 in (183 cm)	203 lb (92 kg)	March 7, 1968 (aged 19)	(United States) Boston College Eagles
6	D	Jeff Norton	6 ft 2 in (188 cm)	198 lb (90 kg)	November 25, 1965 (aged 22)	(United States) Michigan Wolverines
8	F	Kevin Miller	5 ft 11 in (180 cm)	185 lb (84 kg)	September 2, 1965 (aged 22)	(United States) Michigan State Spartans
9	F	Scott Fusco	5 ft 9 in (175 cm)	172 lb (78 kg)	January 21, 1963 (aged 25)	(Switzerland) EHC Olten
11	F	Todd Okerlund	5 ft 11 in (180 cm)	201 lb (91 kg)	September 6, 1964 (aged 23)	(United States) Minnesota Golden Golphers
11	F	Corey Millen	5 ft 6 in (168 cm)	190 lb (86 kg)	March 30, 1964 (aged 23)	(United States) Minnesota Golden Golphers
14	F	Scott Young	6 ft 1 in (185 cm)	201 lb (91 kg)	October 1, 1967 (aged 20)	(United States) Boston University Terriers
15	F	Craig Janney	6 ft 0 in (183 cm)	201 lb (91 kg)	September 26, 1967 (aged 20)	(United States) Boston College Eagles
17	F	Clark Donatelli	5 ft 10 in (178 cm)	183 lb (83 kg)	November 22, 1965 (aged 22)	(United States) Boston University Terriers
19	F	Lane MacDonald	5 ft 11 in (180 cm)	187 lb (85 kg)	March 3, 1966 (aged 21)	(United States) Harvard Crimson
20	F	Allen Bourbeau	5 ft 9 in (175 cm)	174 lb (79 kg)	May 17, 1965 (aged 22)	(United States) Harvard Crimson
21	F	Tony Granato	5 ft 10 in (178 cm)	187 lb (85 kg)	July 25, 1964 (aged 23)	(United States) Wisconsin Badgers
22	F	Dave Snuggerud	6 ft 0 in (183 cm)	190 lb (86 kg)	June 20, 1966 (aged 21)	(United States) Minnesota Golden Golphers
23	D	Guy Gosselin	5 ft 11 in (180 cm)	192 lb (87 kg)	January 6, 1964 (aged 24)	(United States) Minnesota Duluth Bulldogs
24	F	Jim Johannson	6 ft 2 in (188 cm)	201 lb (91 kg)	March 10, 1964 (aged 23)	(Germany) EV Landsberg
26	D	Peter Laviolette	6 ft 2 in (188 cm)	201 lb (91 kg)	December 7, 1964 (aged 23)	(United States) Indianapolis Checkers
27	D	Eric Weinrich	6 ft 1 in (185 cm)	209 lb (95 kg)	December 19, 1966 (aged 21)	(United States) Maine Black Bears
28	F	Steve Leach	5 ft 11 in (180 cm)	201 lb (91 kg)	January 16, 1966 (aged 22)	(United States) Binghamton Whalers
29	G	John Blue	5 ft 10 in (178 cm)	183 lb (83 kg)	February 19, 1966 (aged 21)	(United States) Minnesota Golden Golphers
30	G	Chris Terreri	5 ft 9 in (175 cm)	154 lb (70 kg)	November 15, 1964 (aged 23)	(United States) Maine Mariners
32	F	Kevin Stevens	6 ft 3 in (191 cm)	229 lb (104 kg)	April 15, 1965 (aged 22)	(United States) Boston College Eagles

== West Germany ==
Head coach: Xaver Unsinn

Assistant coach: (Czechoslovakia) Petr Hejma

No.	Pos.	Name	Height	Weight	Birthdate	Team
1	G	Helmut de Raaf	6 ft 1 in (185 cm)	176 lb (80 kg)	November 5, 1961 (aged 26)	(Germany) Kölner EC
3	D	Harold Kreis (A)	5 ft 11 in (180 cm)	196 lb (89 kg)	January 19, 1959 (aged 29)	(Germany) Mannheimer ERC
4	D	Udo Kießling (C)	5 ft 11 in (180 cm)	185 lb (84 kg)	May 21, 1955 (aged 32)	(Germany) Kölner EC
5	D	Manfred Schuster	6 ft 1 in (185 cm)	185 lb (84 kg)	December 14, 1958 (aged 29)	(Germany) ESV Kaufbeuren
6	D	Dieter Medicus	6 ft 4 in (193 cm)	212 lb (96 kg)	April 7, 1957 (aged 30)	(Germany) ESV Kaufbeuren
7	D	Ron Fischer	6 ft 3 in (191 cm)	207 lb (94 kg)	April 12, 1959 (aged 28)	(Germany) Sportbund DJK Rosenheim
9	F	Peter Obresa	5 ft 9 in (175 cm)	165 lb (75 kg)	August 6, 1960 (aged 27)	(Germany) Mannheimer ERC
10	F	Christian Brittig	5 ft 11 in (180 cm)	170 lb (77 kg)	March 27, 1966 (aged 21)	(Germany) EV Landshut
11	F	Manfred Wolf	6 ft 0 in (183 cm)	187 lb (85 kg)	March 26, 1957 (aged 30)	(Germany) Düsseldorfer EG
13	F	Peter Draisaitl	6 ft 0 in (183 cm)	190 lb (86 kg)	December 7, 1965 (aged 22)	(Germany) Mannheimer ERC
14	F	Bernd Truntschka	5 ft 11 in (180 cm)	176 lb (80 kg)	April 7, 1965 (aged 22)	(Germany) EV Landshut
15	D	Horst-Peter Kretschmer	6 ft 0 in (183 cm)	196 lb (89 kg)	October 19, 1955 (aged 32)	(Germany) Sportbund DJK Rosenheim
16	F	Georg Holzmann	5 ft 11 in (180 cm)	187 lb (85 kg)	March 5, 1961 (aged 26)	(Germany) Mannheimer ERC
17	F	Gerd Truntschka	5 ft 9 in (175 cm)	165 lb (75 kg)	September 10, 1958 (aged 29)	(Germany) Kölner EC
18	D	Joachim Reil	5 ft 10 in (178 cm)	183 lb (83 kg)	May 17, 1955 (aged 32)	(Germany) Sportbund DJK Rosenheim
19	D	Andreas Niederberger	5 ft 10 in (178 cm)	181 lb (82 kg)	April 20, 1963 (aged 24)	(Germany) Düsseldorfer EG
22	F	Roy Roedger	6 ft 4 in (193 cm)	203 lb (92 kg)	October 11, 1958 (aged 29)	(Germany) Düsseldorfer EG
23	F	Dieter Hegen	6 ft 0 in (183 cm)	198 lb (90 kg)	April 29, 1962 (aged 25)	(Germany) Kölner EC
24	F	Helmut Steiger	5 ft 10 in (178 cm)	176 lb (80 kg)	January 5, 1959 (aged 29)	(Germany) Kölner EC
26	F	Peter Schiller	5 ft 10 in (178 cm)	172 lb (78 kg)	June 29, 1957 (aged 30)	(Germany) Mannheimer ERC
27	G	Karl Friesen	6 ft 0 in (183 cm)	165 lb (75 kg)	June 30, 1958 (aged 29)	(Germany) Sportbund DJK Rosenheim
28	F	Georg Franz	5 ft 9 in (175 cm)	172 lb (78 kg)	January 9, 1965 (aged 23)	(Germany) Sportbund DJK Rosenheim
30	G	Josef Schlickenrieder	6 ft 0 in (183 cm)	181 lb (82 kg)	May 7, 1958 (aged 29)	(Germany) Mannheimer ERC

== Sources ==
- Duplacey, James (1998). Total Hockey: The official encyclopedia of the National Hockey League. Total Sports. ISBN 0-8362-7114-9.
- Podnieks, Andrew (2010). IIHF Media Guide & Record Book 2011. Moydart Pres.
- Hockey Hall Of Fame page on the 1988 Olympics
- Wallechinsky, David (1988). The Complete Book of the Olympics. Penguin Books. pp. 614. ISBN 0-14-010771-1.
