= Poland at the 1988 Winter Olympics =

- IOC code: POL
- NOC: Polish Olympic Committee
- Website: www.pkol.pl (in Polish)

in Calgary
- Competitors: 32 (28 men, 4 women) in 6 sports
- Flag bearers: Henryk Gruth, ice hockey
- Medals: Gold 0 Silver 0 Bronze 0 Total 0

Winter Olympics appearances (overview)
- 1924; 1928; 1932; 1936; 1948; 1952; 1956; 1960; 1964; 1968; 1972; 1976; 1980; 1984; 1988; 1992; 1994; 1998; 2002; 2006; 2010; 2014; 2018; 2022; 2026

Poland competed at the 1988 Winter Olympics in Calgary, Alberta, Canada.

== Competitors ==
The following is the list of number of competitors in the Games.

Sport	Men	Women	Total
Alpine skiing	0	1	1
Figure skating	2	1	3
Ice hockey	22	–	22
Nordic combined	1	–	1
Ski jumping	2	–	2
Speed skating	1	2	3
Total	28	4	32

== Alpine skiing ==
Athlete	Event	Race 1	Race 2	Total	
Athlete	Event	Time	Time	Time	Rank
Katarzyna Szafrańska	Giant slalom	1:03.33	1:09.50	2:12.83	16
Katarzyna Szafrańska	Slalom	52.15	52.06	1:44.21	17

== Figure skating ==
Athlete	Event	CF/CD	SP/OD	FS/FD	TFP	Rank
Grzegorz Filipowski	Men's	7	4	5	10.8	5
Honorata Górna; Andrzej Dostatni	Ice dance	17	17	17	34.0	17

== Ice hockey ==
=== Group A ===
Top three teams (shaded ones) entered the medal round.

	Pld	W	L	T	GF	GA	Pts
Finland	5	3	1	1	22	8	7
Sweden	5	2	0	3	23	10	7
Canada	5	3	1	1	17	12	7
Switzerland	5	3	2	0	19	10	6
Poland	5	1	3	1	9	13	3
France	5	0	5	0	10	47	0

- Canada 1-0 Poland
- Sweden 1-1 Poland
- Poland 6-2 France*
- Switzerland 4-1 Poland
- Finland 5-1 Poland

* The Polish team was stripped of its victory after Jarosław Morawiecki tested positive for testosterone. France was recorded as having a 2-nil win, but received no points in the standings.

=== Game for 9th place ===
Team 1	Score	Team 2
Austria	3–2	Poland

Contestants; Andrzej Hanisz; Gabriel Samolej; Franciszek Kukla; Robert Szopiński; Marek Cholewa; Henryk Gruth; Andrzej Kądziołka; Jerzy Potz; Andrzej Świątek; Jacek Szopiński; Janusz Adamiec; Roman Steblecki; Jerzy Christ; Mirosław Copija; Leszek Jachna; Marek Stebnicki; Piotr Kwasigroch; Ireneusz Pacula; Krzysztof Podsiadło; Krystian Sikorski; Jan Stopczyk; Jarosław Morawiecki

== Nordic combined ==
Events:

- normal hill ski jumping (Best two out of three jumps.)
- 15 km cross-country skiing (Start delay, based on ski jumping results.)

Athlete	Event	Ski Jumping		Cross-country		Total	
Athlete	Event	Points	Rank	Start at	Time	Points	Rank
Tadeusz Bafia	Individual	211.3	8	1:54.7	43:00.0	400.355	18

== Ski jumping ==
Athlete	Event	Jump 1		Jump 2		Total	
Athlete	Event	Distance	Points	Distance	Points	Points	Rank
Piotr Fijas	Men's normal hill	84.5	102.3	80.0	93.1	195.4	10
Piotr Fijas	Men's large hill	107.5	99.9	102.0	92.7	192.6	13
Jan Kowal	Men's normal hill	79.0	90.5	77.0	83.8	174.3	34
Jan Kowal	Men's large hill	102.0	89.7	93.0	74.6	164.3	37

== Speed skating ==
Men

Athlete	Event	Final	
Athlete	Event	Time	Rank
Jerzy Dominik	500 m	37.83	25
Jerzy Dominik	1000 m	1:16.16	28
Jerzy Dominik	1500 m	1:59.03	36

Women

Athlete	Event	Final	
Athlete	Event	Time	Rank
Erwina Ryś-Ferens	500 m	41.38	19
Erwina Ryś-Ferens	1000 m	1:21.44	10
Erwina Ryś-Ferens	1500 m	2:04.68	7
Erwina Ryś-Ferens	3000 m	4:22.59	5
Erwina Ryś-Ferens	5000 m	7:50.43	21
Zofia Tokarczyk	500 m	41.37	18
Zofia Tokarczyk	1000 m	1:21.80	13
Zofia Tokarczyk	1500 m	2:08.54	17
