= 1963 in Norway =

- Centuries: 18th; 19th; 20th; 21st
- Decades: 1940s; 1950s; 1960s; 1970s; 1980s
- See also: List of years in Norway

Events in the year 1963 in Norway.

== Incumbents ==
- Monarch – Olav V.
- Prime Minister – Einar Gerhardsen (Labour Party) until 28 August, John Lyng (Conservative Party) until 25 September, Einar Gerhardsen (Labour Party)

== Events ==
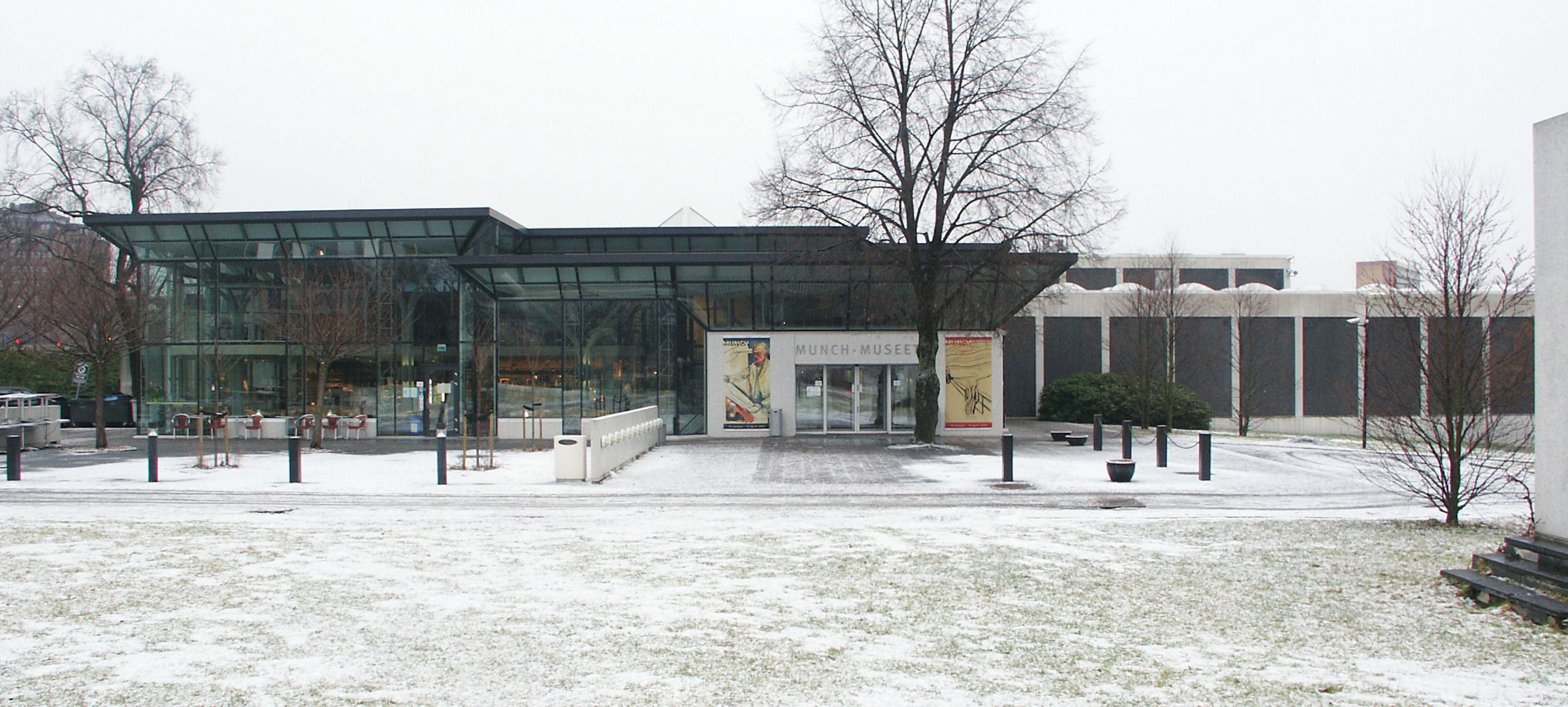
The Munch Museum was opened

- Norway proclaims sovereignty over its continental shelf, establishing state ownership of natural resources, and only the government can award exploration licenses.
- 21 March – MS Høegh Aronde sank near Morocco during a voyage from Sassandra to Valencia, resulting in the deaths of 15 of the 28 Norwegian crew members.
- 1 July – Work begins to build Tromsø Airport
- 28 August – Lyng's Cabinet was appointed.
- 25 September – Gerhardsen's Fourth Cabinet was appointed.
- Norsk Hydro in cooperation with Harvey Aluminum starts Alnor, a plant at Karmøy to produce aluminium
- Municipal and county elections are held throughout the country.
- The Munch Museum was opened, 100 years after Edvard Munch's birth.

== Popular culture ==
=== Music ===
==== Top songs of 1963 in Norway ====
1. Arne Bendiksen - "Jeg vil ha en blå ballong"
2. Cliff Richard - "Summer Holiday"
3. Ned Miller - "From a Jack to a King"
4. Cliff Richard - "Lucky Lips"
5. Elvis Presley - "(You're the) Devil in Disguise"
6. Kyu Sakamoto - "Sukiyaki"
7. Wenche Myhre - "Gi meg en cowboy til mann"
8. Bobby Bare - "Detroit City"
9. Cliff Richard - "Don't Talk to Him"

=== Film ===
Om Tilla, by Arne Skouen

=== Literature ===
- Stein Mehren, poet, novelist, essayist and playwright, is awarded the Norwegian Critics Prize for Literature and the Mads Wiel Nygaards Endowment for Mot en verden av lys.

== Notable births ==
=== January ===
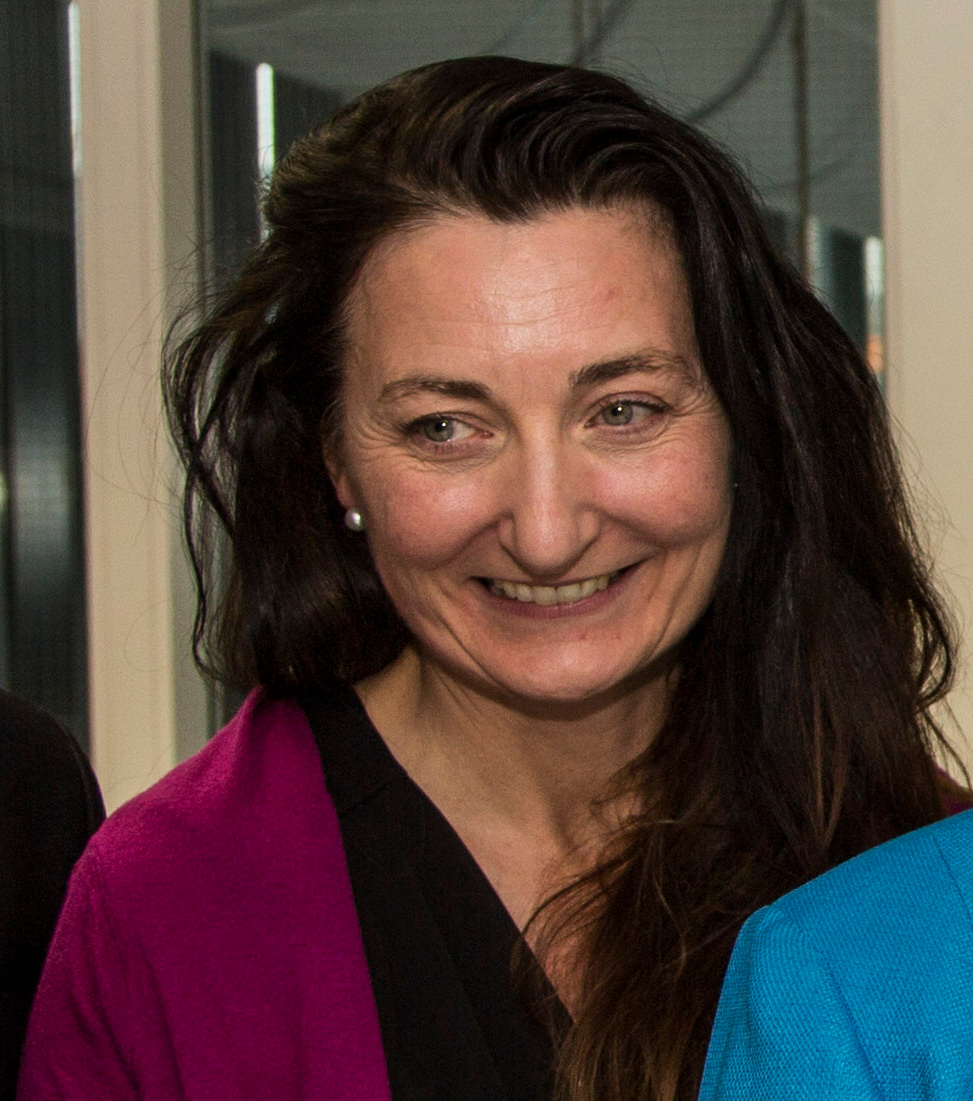
May-Britt Moser

- 4 January – May-Britt Moser, neuroscientist and winner of the Nobel Prize in Physiology or Medicine.
- 7 January – Georg Andersen, shot putter.
- 14 January – Steffen Kverneland, comics artist.
- 15 January – Erling Kagge, adventurer and publisher.
- 23 January – Rune Gulliksen, ice hockey player.
- 30 January – Terje Holtet Larsen, journalist and author.

=== February ===
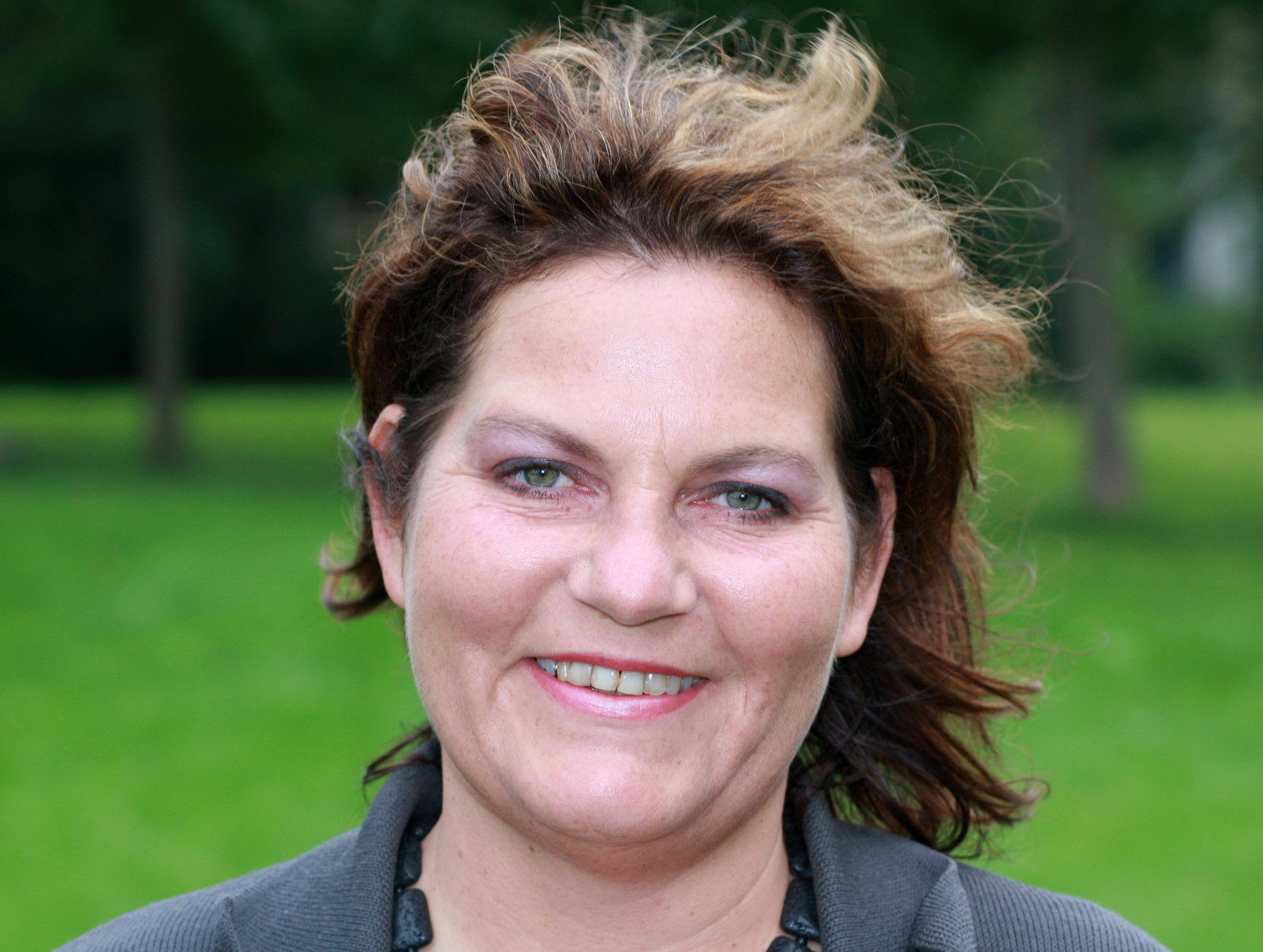
Siri A. Meling

- 3 February
  - Jørn Andersen, footballer.
  - Kathrine Bomstad, swimmer.
  - Liv Heløe, actress and playwright.
- 5 February – Jan Kvalheim, beach volleyball player.
- 8 February – Siri A. Meling, politician.

=== March ===
- 14 March – Lisbeth Berg-Hansen, politician.

=== April ===
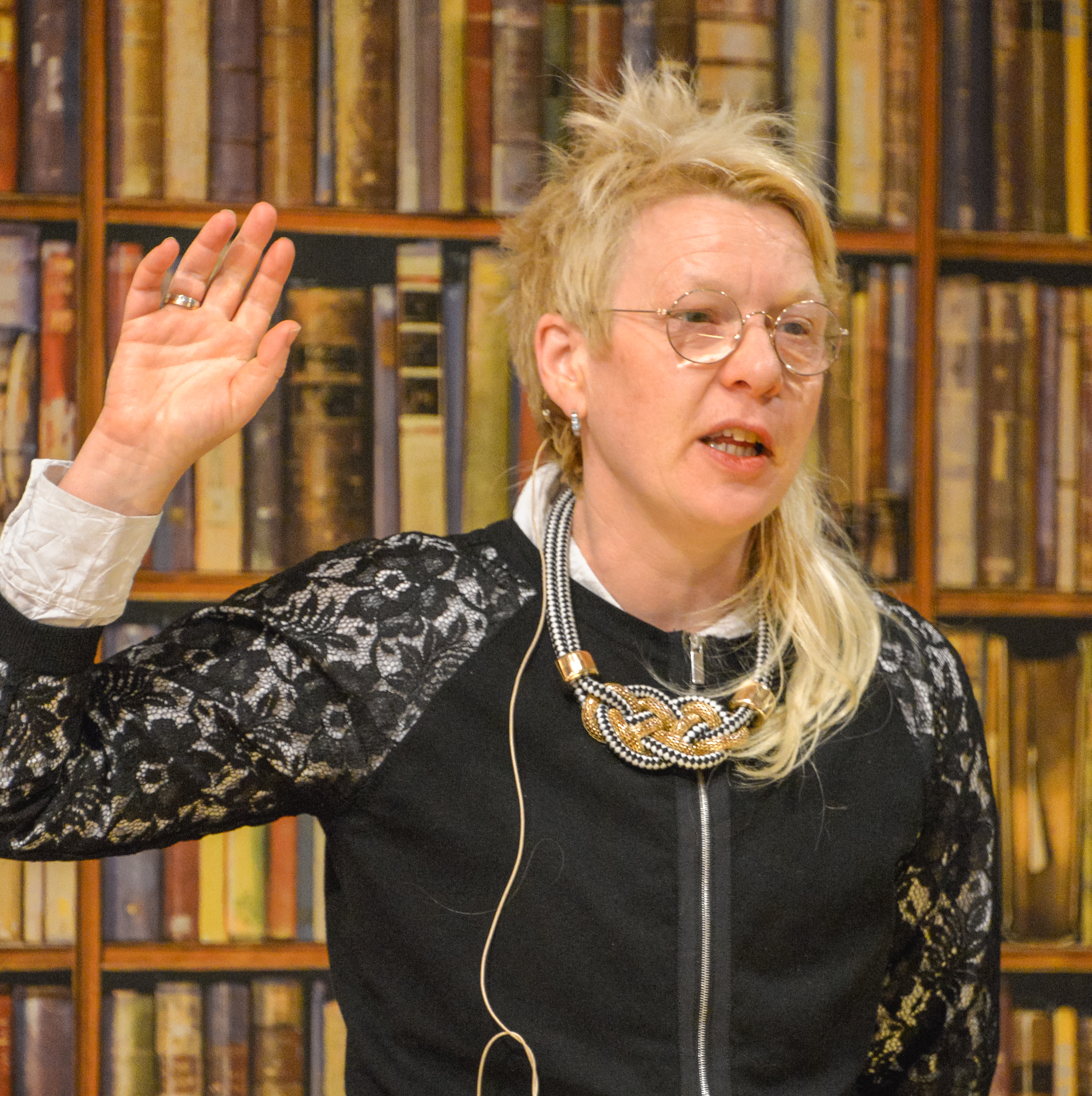
Beate Grimsrud

- 10 April – Rune Christiansen, poet and novelist
- 14 April – Gunvor Eldegard, politician
- 15 April – Mette Wikborg, civil servant.
- 20 April
  - Pål Hembre, sport shooter.
  - Christopher Nielsen, comics artist.
- 21 April – Lars Monsen, adventurer and journalist.
- 28 April
  - Amund Djuve, journalist and newspaper editor.
  - Beate Grimsrud, writer (died 2020).
- 28 April – Henrik Hellstenius, composer and musicologist

=== May ===
- 4 May – Jørgen Salsten, ice hockey player.
- 16 May – Carl Erik Johannessen, sailor.
- 26 May – Merethe Lindstrøm, writer.

=== June ===
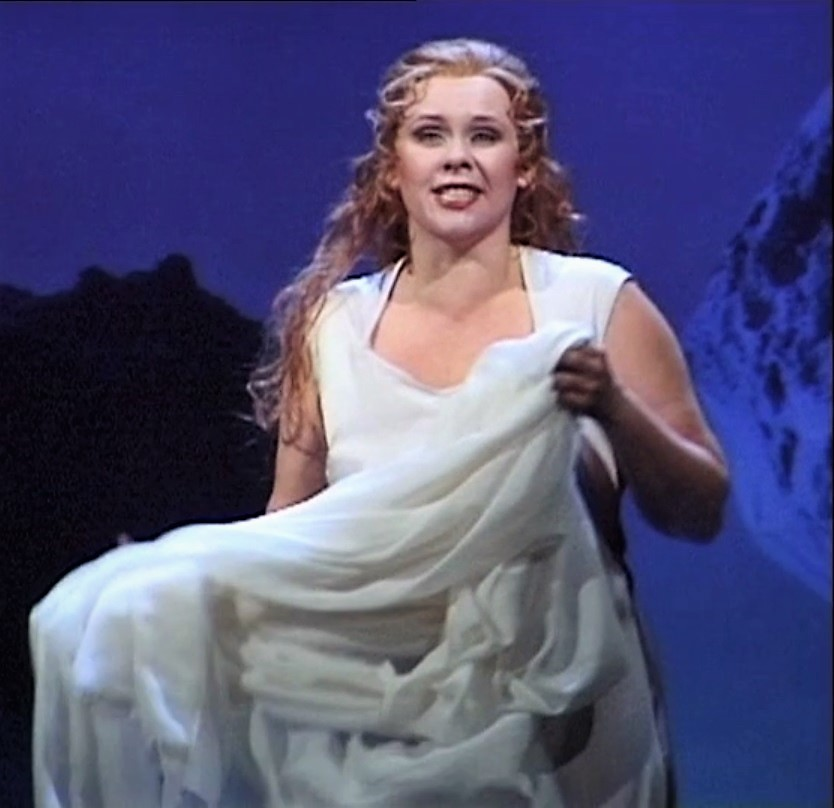
Solveig Kringlebotn

- 4 June
  - Elin Brodin, novelist.
  - Solveig Kringlebotn, operatic soprano.
- 10 June – Kristin Vinje, chemist and politician.
- 20 June
  - Viel Bjerkeset Andersen, artist
  - Anne Jahren, cross-country skier.

=== July ===
- 4 July – Heidi Støre, footballer.
- 6 July – Rolf Terje Klungland, politician.
- 7 July – Geir Karlstad, speed skater.
- 27 July – Lars Bjønness, competition rower.

=== August ===
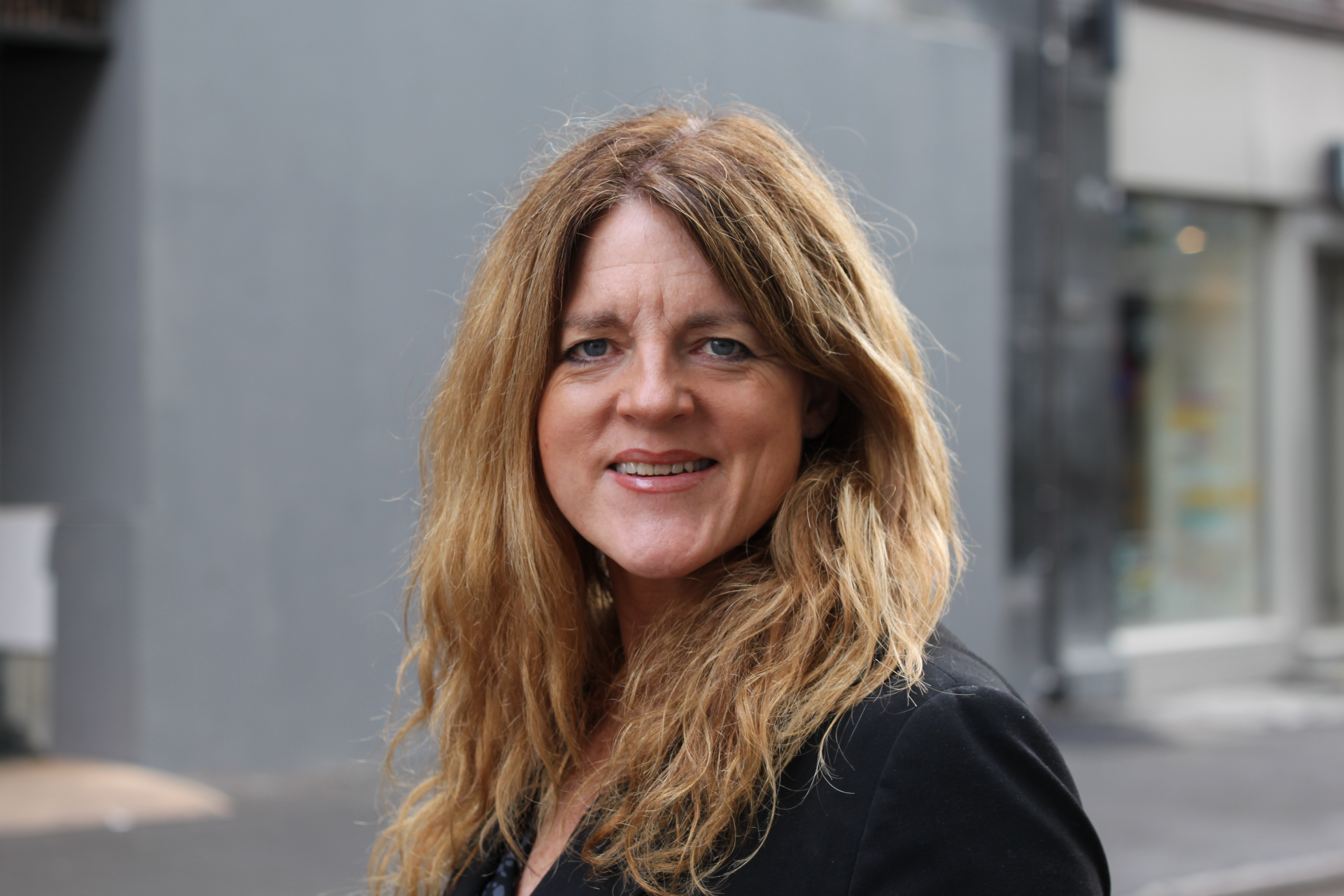
Hilde Frafjord Johnson

- 8 August – Christian Tybring-Gjedde, politician.
- 9 August – Arne Hjeltnes, writer, television personality, and politician.
- 27 August – Kirsti Leirtrø, politician.
- 29 August – Hilde Frafjord Johnson, politician

=== September ===
- 16 September – Vidar Kleppe, politician.
- 22 September – Lisa Scheibert, rower.

=== October ===
- 5 October – Ronni Le Tekrø, guitarist (TNT)
- 18 October – Sigvart Dagsland, singer, pianist and composer

=== November ===
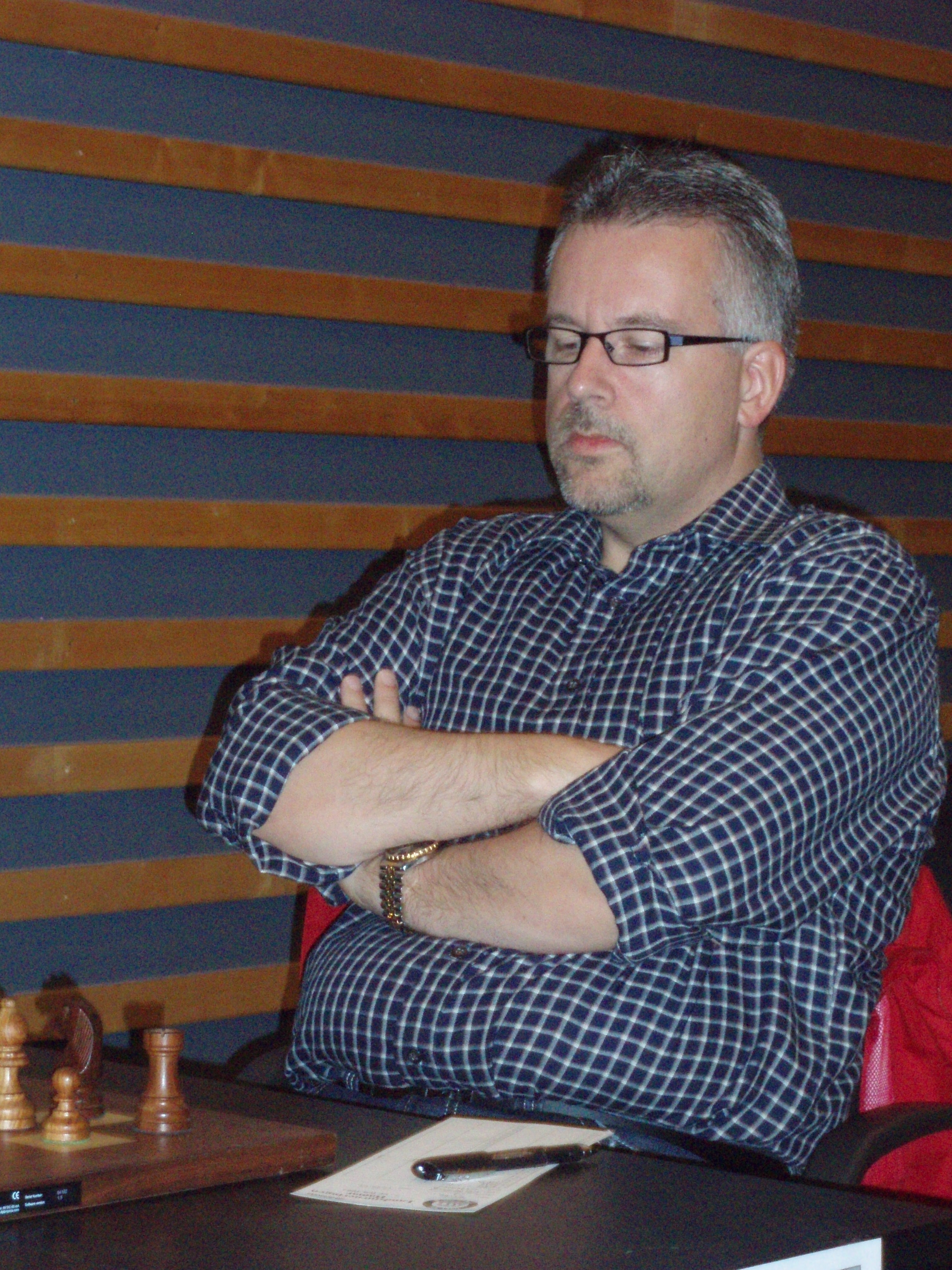
Einar Gausel

- 17 November
  - Einar Hålien, newspaper editor.
  - Roy Waage, politician.
- 19 November – Geir Jørgen Bekkevold, politician.
- 30 November – Einar Gausel, chess player.

=== December ===
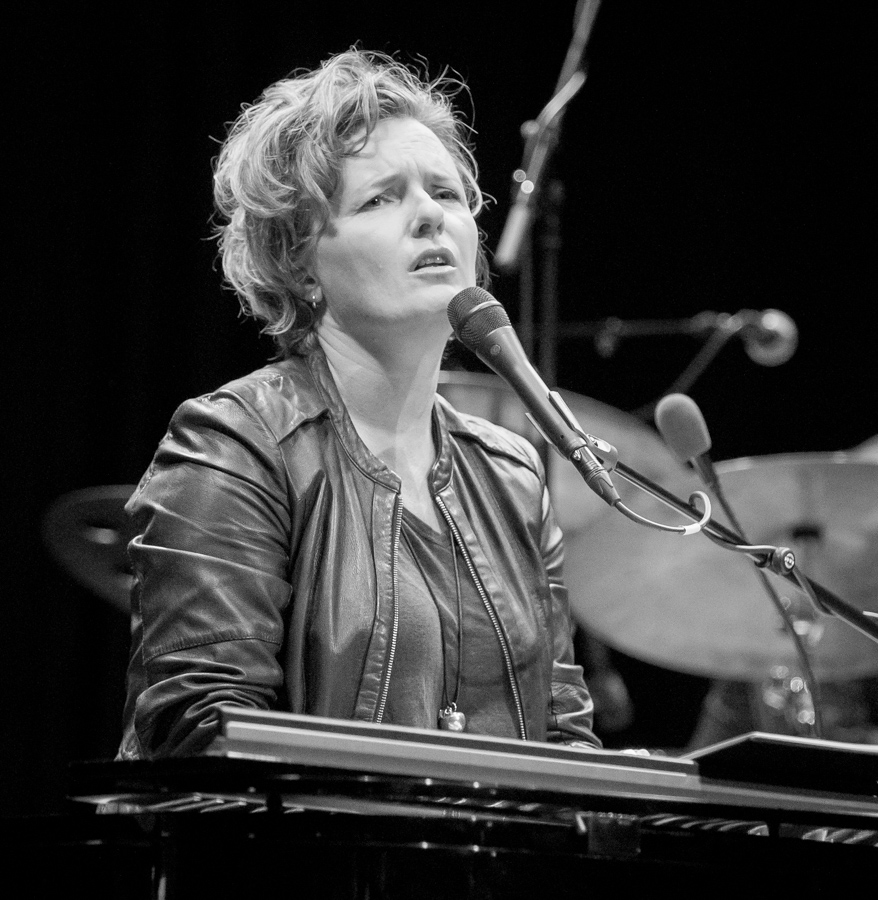
Ingrid Bjørnov

- 5 December – Ingrid Bjørnov, singer, songwriter, keyboard player, composer and text writer.
- 12 December – Arve Seland, footballer.
- 25 December – Øystein Fevang, singer and choir conductor.
- 27 December – Sigrid Brattabø Handegard, politician

=== Full date unknown ===
- Synnøve Eriksen, novelist
- Ole Amund Gjersvik, jazz musician.
- Geir Gulliksen, writer and publisher.

== Notable deaths ==
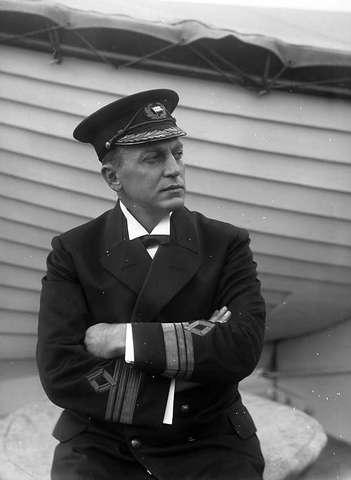
Kjeld Stub Irgens

- 15 January – Bertel Flaten, politician (b.1900)
- 1 February – Hermann Helgesen, gymnast and Olympic silver medallist (b.1889)
- 6 March – Ole Øisang, newspaper editor and politician (b.1893)
- 7 March – Joachim Holst-Jensen, film actor (b.1880)
- 8 March – Per Askim, naval officer (b.1881).
- 13 March – Edvin Paulsen, gymnast and Olympic bronze medallist (b.1889)
- 23 March – Thoralf Skolem, mathematician (b.1887)
- 24 March – Peder Holt, politician (b.1899)
- 28 March – Tollef Tollefsen, rower and Olympic bronze medallist (b.1885)
- 1 April – Agnes Mowinckel, actress and stage producer (b.1875).
- 10 April – Ottar Gjermundshaug, Nordic combined skier (b.1925)
- 11 April
  - Thorleif Holbye, sailor and Olympic gold medallist (b.1883)
  - Arvid Gram Paulsen, jazz musician and composer (b. 1922)
- 13 June – Olav Bjørnstad, rower and Olympic bronze medallist (b.1882)
- 14 June – Olav Hindahl, trade unionist and politician (b.1892)
- 17 June – Eugen Lunde, sailor and Olympic gold medallist (b.1887)
- 20 June – Erling Vinne, triple jumper (b.1892)
- 30 June – Erling Aastad, long jumper and sprinter (b.1898)
- 11 July – Paal Kaasen, sailor and Olympic gold medallist (b.1883)
- 14 July – Rasmus Hatledal, topographer and military officer (b.1885)
- 27 July – Trygve Bøyesen, gymnast and Olympic silver medallist (b.1886)
- 2 August – Thorstein Johansen, rifle shooter and Olympic gold medallist (b.1888)
- 7 August – Knut Markhus, educator and politician (b. 1878).
- 18 September – Karl Johan Edvardsen, politician (b.1883)
- 20 September – Thorleiv Røhn, military officer, gymnast and Olympic gold medallist (b.1881)
- 27 September – Svein Olsen Øraker, politician (b.1886)
- 2 November – Per Gulbrandsen, rower and Olympic bronze medallist (b.1897)
- 18 November – Astrid Skare, politician (b.1891)
- 1 December – Jacob Erstad, gymnast (b.1898)
- 16 December – Anton Beinset, journalist, newspaper editor, short story writer, crime fiction writer and politician (born 1894).
- 19 December – Ingolf Rød, sailor and Olympic gold medallist (b.1889)
- 27 December – Sigvard Sivertsen, gymnast and Olympic gold medallist (b.1881)

=== Full date unknown ===
- Nils Selmer Hauff, bookseller (b.1882)
- Hjalmar Holand, historian (b.1872)
- Kjeld Stub Irgens, sea captain and collaborator minister (b.1879)
- Lars Knutsen, shipowner (b.1884)
- Magnus Olsen, linguist and professor of Norse philology (b.1878)
- Ulrik Olsen, politician and Minister (b.1885)
- Didrik Arup Seip, linguist and professor (b.1884)
