= Neuenschwander =

Neuenschwander is a Swiss surname that may refer to

- Bob Neuenschwander (1948–2022), American businessman and politician
- Caryl Neuenschwander (born 1984), Swiss ice hockey player
- Juerg Neuenschwander (born 1953), Swiss documentary film director and producer
- Jürg Neuenschwander (1947–2014), Swiss organist and musician
- Katrin Neuenschwander (born 1971), Swiss alpine skier
- Maja Neuenschwander (born 1980), Swiss long-distance runner
- Marie Brennan, pen name of the American fantasy author Bryn Neuenschwander
- Philipp Neuenschwander (born 1964), Swiss ice hockey forward
- Rivane Neuenschwander (born 1967), Brazilian artist
- Rosa Neuenschwander (1883–1962), Swiss feminist
