= Steblecki =

Steblecki is a surname. Notable people with the surname include:

- Roman Steblecki (born 1963), Polish ice hockey player
- Sebastian Steblecki (born 1992), Polish footballer
