= Viel (name) =

Viel is a given name and a surname. Notable persons with that name include:

== People with the given name ==
- Viel Bjerkeset Andersen (born 1963), Norwegian artist

== People with the surname ==
- Alain Viel, French educator
- Cristián Viel (born 1967), Argentine rugby union player
- Felipe Viel (born 1971), Chilean actor
- Glenn Viel (born 1980), French chef
- Jean-Marie-Victor Viel (1796–1863), French architect
- Marguerite Viel, French screenwriter and film director
- Mattia Viel (born 1995), Italian cyclist
- Nicolas Viel (died 1625), French missionary
- Placide Viel (1815–1877), French nun and mother general
- Roger Viel (1902–1981), French athlete
- Sabrina Viel (born 1973), Italian ice hockey player
- Tanguy Viel (born 1973), French writer

== See also ==
- Veel
