= Kądziołka =

Kądziołka is a Polish surname, and may refer to

- Andrzej Kądziołka (born 1960), Polish ice hockey player
- Beata Kądziołka, former name of Beata Zawadzka (born 1986), Polish chess player
- Franciszek Kądziołka (1926–1983), Polish cinematograph
- Stanisław Kądziołka (1902–1971), Polish military patrol runner
