= Morawiecki =

Morawiecki (feminine Morawiecka) is a Polish surname. Notable people with the surname include:

- Jarosław Morawiecki (born 1964), Polish former ice hockey player and coach
- Kornel Morawiecki (1941–2019), Polish activist
- Mateusz Morawiecki (born 1968), Polish politician, former prime minister of Poland
