= Lars Knudsen =

Lars Knudsen may refer to:

- Lars Knudsen (cryptographer) (born 1962), Danish researcher in cryptography
- Lars Knudsen (producer), Danish film producer

== See also ==
- Lars Knutsen
