= Veel =

Veel Is a surname. Notable people with the surname include:

- Armand Le Véel (1821–1905), French sculptor
- Edward Veel (1632–1708), English academic, ejected minister, and dissenting tutor
- Joseph Colborne-Veel (1831–1895), journalist and educator in New Zealand
- Robert Veel (died c. 1432), English politician

== See also ==
- Viel (name)
