= John Blue (ice hockey) =

American ice hockey player (born 1966)

- Born: February 19, 1966 (age 60) Huntington Beach, California, U.S.
- Height: 5 ft 10 in (178 cm)
- Weight: 185 lb (84 kg; 13 st 3 lb)
- Position: Goaltender
- Caught: Right
- Played for: Boston Bruins; Buffalo Sabres; University of Minnesota
- National team: United States
- NHL draft: 197th overall, 1986; Winnipeg Jets
- Playing career: 1987–1997

John Thomas Blue (born February 19, 1966) is an American former ice hockey goaltender. He played 46 games in the National Hockey League with the Boston Bruins and Buffalo Sabres between 1992 and 1996. The majority of his career, which lasted from 1987 to 1995, was spent in various minor leagues. Internationally Blue was part of the American national team at the 1988 Winter Olympics, but he did not play. He also was part of the American team at three World Championships, though only played one game, in the 1990 and 1997 tournaments.

== Playing career ==
Blue was the starting goaltender for each of his three seasons on the University of Minnesota hockey team (1984–87). He was named a WCHA First Team All-Star in 1986 and won 64 games during his Gopher career, the fourth highest win total in team history.

During the 1983–84 season he played in the USHL for the Des Moines Buccaneers. He was drafted in the tenth round, 197th overall, by the Winnipeg Jets in the 1986 NHL entry draft. Blue made his NHL debut on January 7, 1993, against the Quebec Nordiques. He played in the National Hockey League for the Boston Bruins and Buffalo Sabres and was the first Californian goaltender in the history of the National Hockey League.

== International play ==
He was a backup goalie for the American national team at the 1988 Winter Olympics, but did not play any games. Blue was also part of the American team at the 1990 and 1992 World Championships, only played 5 games in 1990. He was named to the national team once more for the 1997 World Championships, where he played in one game.

== Personal life ==
Blue was born in Huntington Beach, California, then left for Spokane, Washington at age 5. He began ice skating in Spokane, then after his family moved to San Jose, he became youth goaltender for the Santa Clara Blackhawks in Northern California.

Throughout his career, he called Huntington Beach his offseason home. He currently works as a pastor after having become deeply involved in religious studies during his playing days.

== Career statistics ==
=== Regular season and playoffs ===
			Regular season									Playoffs
Season	Team	League	GP	W	L	T	MIN	GA	SO	GAA	SV%	GP	W	L	MIN	GA	SO	GAA	SV%
1983–84	Des Moines Buccaneers	USHL	15	—	—	—	753	63	0	5.02	—	—	—	—	—	—	—	—	—
1984–85	University of Minnesota	WCHA	34	23	10	0	1964	111	2	3.39	.886	—	—	—	—	—	—	—	—
1985–86	University of Minnesota	WCHA	29	20	6	0	1588	80	2	3.02	.890	—	—	—	—	—	—	—	—
1986–87	University of Minnesota	WCHA	33	21	9	1	1889	99	3	3.14	.889	—	—	—	—	—	—	—	—
1987–88	United States	Intl	13	3	4	1	588	33	0	3.37	—	—	—	—	—	—	—	—	—
1987–88	Kalamazoo Wings	IHL	15	3	8	4	847	65	0	4.60	.874	1	0	1	40	6	0	9.00	—
1988–89	Kalamazoo Wings	IHL	17	8	6	0	970	69	0	4.27	.879	—	—	—	—	—	—	—	—
1988–89	Virginia Lancers	ECHL	10	—	—	—	570	38	0	4.00	.896	—	—	—	—	—	—	—	—
1989–90	Phoenix Roadrunners	IHL	19	5	10	3	986	92	0	5.65	.853	—	—	—	—	—	—	—	—
1989–90	Knoxville Cherokees	ECHL	19	6	10	1	1000	85	0	5.15	.877	—	—	—	—	—	—	—	—
1989–90	Kalamazoo Wings	IHL	4	2	1	1	232	18	0	4.65	.892	—	—	—	—	—	—	—	—
1990–91	Maine Mariners	AHL	10	3	4	2	545	22	0	2.42	.927	1	0	1	40	7	0	10.50	—
1990–91	Albany Choppers	IHL	19	11	6	0	1077	71	0	3.96	—	—	—	—	—	—	—	—	—
1990–91	Kalamazoo Wings	IHL	1	1	0	0	64	2	0	1.88	—	—	—	—	—	—	—	—	—
1990–91	Peoria Rivermen	IHL	4	4	0	0	240	12	0	3.00	.896	—	—	—	—	—	—	—	—
1990–91	Knoxville Cherokees	ECHL	3	1	1	0	149	13	0	5.23	.849	—	—	—	—	—	—	—	—
1991–92	Maine Mariners	AHL	43	11	23	6	2168	165	1	4.57	.862	—	—	—	—	—	—	—	—
1992–93	Boston Bruins	NHL	23	9	8	4	1322	64	1	2.90	.893	2	0	1	96	5	0	3.12	.898
1992–93	Providence Bruins	AHL	19	14	4	1	1159	67	0	3.47	.898	—	—	—	—	—	—	—	—
1993–94	Boston Bruins	NHL	18	5	8	3	944	47	0	2.99	.885	—	—	—	—	—	—	—	—
1993–94	Providence Bruins	AHL	24	7	11	4	1298	76	1	3.51	.880	—	—	—	—	—	—	—	—
1994–95	Providence Bruins	AHL	10	6	3	0	577	30	0	3.11	.888	4	1	3	219	19	0	5.19	.854
1995–96	Buffalo Sabres	NHL	5	2	2	0	255	15	0	3.52	.891	—	—	—	—	—	—	—	—
1995–96	Phoenix Roadrunners	IHL	8	1	5	0	309	21	0	4.07	.866	—	—	—	—	—	—	—	—
1995–96	Fort Wayne Komets	IHL	5	1	2	2	249	19	0	4.58	.844	—	—	—	—	—	—	—	—
1995–96	Rochester Americans	AHL	14	4	6	1	672	41	0	3.66	.878	1	0	1	27	1	0	2.24	.909
1996–97	Austin Ice Bats	WPHL	33	17	11	5	1955	113	1	3.47	.906	2	0	2	97	11	0	6.82	.836
NHL totals			46	16	18	7	2522	126	1	3.00	.890	2	0	1	96	5	0	3.12	.898

=== International ===
Year	Team	Event	GP	W	L	T	MIN	GA	SO	GAA	SV%
1990	United States	WC	5	2	2	0	204	17	0	4.99	—
1997	United States	WC	1	1	0	0	60	1	0	1.00	.958
Senior totals			6	3	2	0	264	18	0	4.09	—

== Awards and honors ==
Award	Year
All-WCHA Second Team	1984–85
All-WCHA First Team	1985–86
