= Sebastian Steblecki =

Polish footballer

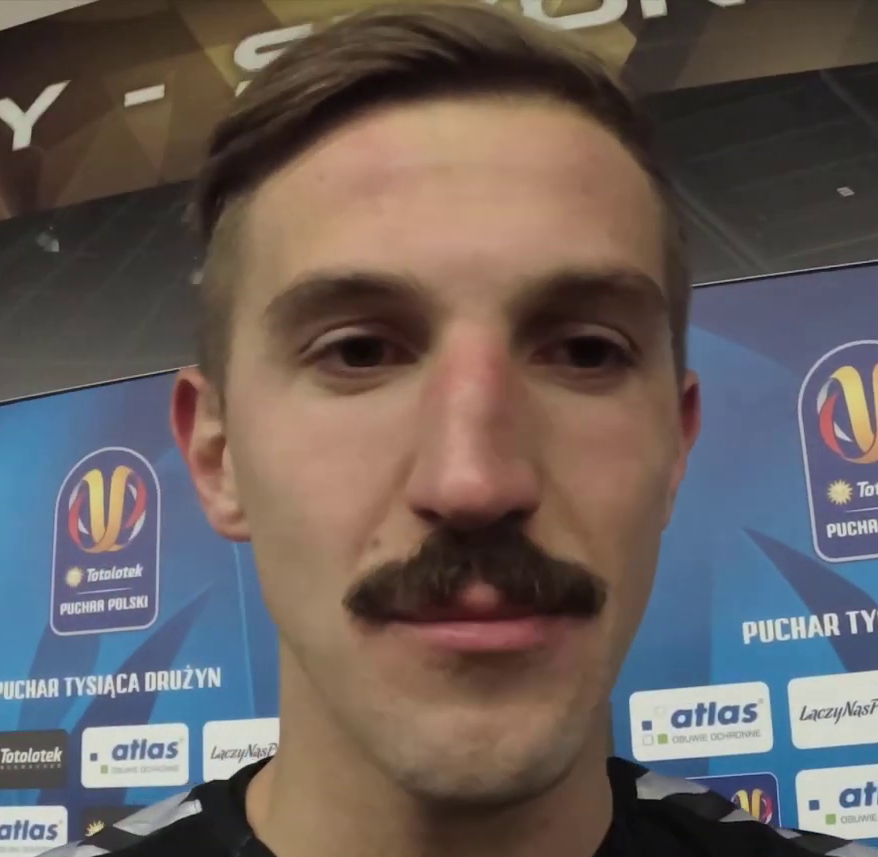
- Steblecki in 2019

Personal information
- Full name: Sebastian Steblecki
- Date of birth: 16 January 1992 (age 34)
- Place of birth: Kraków, Poland
- Height: 1.86 m (6 ft 1 in)
- Position: Left midfielder

Team information
- Current team: Warta Poznań
- Number: 71

Youth career
- Armatura Kraków
- –2012: Cracovia

Senior career*
Years	Team	Apps	(Gls)
2012–2014	Cracovia	69	(2)
2014–2016	SC Cambuur	13	(2)
2016	Górnik Zabrze	13	(2)
2016–2018	Cracovia	28	(3)
2018	Chojniczanka Chojnice	13	(0)
2018–2022	GKS Tychy	123	(9)
2022–2023	Chrobry Głogów	36	(7)
2024–2025	Polonia Bytom	43	(0)
2025–	Warta Poznań	27	(2)

International career
2013	Poland U21	3	(0)
- * Club domestic league appearances and goals as of 09:23, 31 May 2026 (UTC)

Sebastian Steblecki (born 16 January 1992) is a Polish professional footballer who plays as a midfielder for I liga club Warta Poznań.

== Career ==
In January 2018, he moved to Chojniczanka Chojnice.

== Personal life ==
His father, Roman Steblecki, was an ice hockey player who played at the 1988 Winter Olympics.

== Career statistics ==
As of match played 30 May 2026

Appearances and goals by club, season and competition
Club	Season	League			National cup (Note: Includes Polish Cup, KNVB Cup)		Europe		Other		Total	
Club	Season	Division	Apps	Goals	Apps	Goals	Apps	Goals	Apps	Goals	Apps	Goals
Cracovia	2011–12	Ekstraklasa	7	1	1	0	—		—		8	1
Cracovia	2012–13	I liga	26	0	2	0	—		—		28	0
Cracovia	2013–14	Ekstraklasa	31	1	0	0	—		—		31	1
Cracovia	2014–15	Ekstraklasa	5	0	0	0	—		—		5	0
Cracovia	Total		69	2	3	0	—		—		72	2
SC Cambuur	2014–15	Eredivisie	11	2	3	1	—		—		14	3
SC Cambuur	2015–16	Eredivisie	2	0	0	0	—		—		2	0
SC Cambuur	Total		13	2	3	1	—		—		16	3
Górnik Zabrze	2015–16	Ekstraklasa	13	2	—		—		—		13	2
Górnik Zabrze II	2015–16	III liga, gr. F	2	0	—		—		—		2	0
Cracovia	2016–17	Ekstraklasa	26	3	1	0	1 (Note: Appearance in UEFA Europa League)	0	—		28	3
Cracovia	2017–18	Ekstraklasa	2	0	0	0	—		—		2	0
Cracovia	Total		28	3	1	0	1	0	—		30	3
Chojniczanka Chojnice	2017–18	I liga	13	0	—		—		—		13	0
GKS Tychy	2018–19	I liga	32	1	1	0	—		—		33	1
GKS Tychy	2019–20	I liga	33	2	4	0	—		—		37	2
GKS Tychy	2020–21	I liga	34	4	1	0	—		1 (Note: Appearance in I liga promotion play-offs)	0	36	4
GKS Tychy	2021–22	I liga	23	2	2	0	—		—		25	2
GKS Tychy	Total		122	9	8	0	—		1	0	131	9
Chrobry Głogów	2022–23	I liga	33	7	2	1	—		—		35	8
Chrobry Głogów	2023–24	I liga	3	0	0	0	—		—		3	0
Chrobry Głogów	Total		36	7	2	1	—		—		38	8
Polonia Bytom	2023–24	II liga	14	0	—		—		0	0	14	0
Polonia Bytom	2024–25	II liga	29	0	1	0	—		—		30	0
Polonia Bytom	Total		43	0	1	0	—		0	0	44	0
Warta Poznań	2025–26	II liga	27	2	1	0	—		—		28	2
Career total			366	27	19	2	1	0	1	0	387	29

== Honours ==
Polonia Bytom

- II liga: 2024–25
