= Fausto Mazzoleni =

Swiss ice hockey player

- Born: December 15, 1960 (age 64); Chur, Switzerland
- Height: 6 ft 0 in (183 cm)
- Weight: 198 lb (90 kg; 14 st 2 lb)
- Position: Defence
- Played for: HC Davos; Kloten Flyers; EV Zug
- National team: Switzerland
- Playing career: 1979–1996

Fausto Mazzoleni (born December 15, 1960) is a former Swiss professional ice hockey defenceman. He played in the Nationalliga A for HC Davos, EHC Kloten and EV Zug.

Mazzoleni participated as a member of the Swiss national team at the 1988 Winter Olympics.
