= Roman Wäger =

Swiss ice hockey player

- Born: February 20, 1963 (age 62) Switzerland
- Height: 5 ft 11 in (180 cm)
- Weight: 194 lb (88 kg; 13 st 12 lb)
- Position: Left wing
- Played for: Kloten Flyers
- National team: Switzerland
- Playing career: 1980–1999

Roman Wäger (born February 20, 1963) is a retired Swiss professional ice hockey left winger who last played for Kloten Flyers in the National League A. He also represented the Swiss national team at several international tournaments, including the 1988 Winter Olympics.
