= Tommy Skaarberg =

Norwegian ice hockey player

Personal information
- Full name: Tommy Sigurd Skaarberg
- Born: 6 October 1960 (age 65) Sarpsborg, Norway

Sport
- Country: Norway
- Sport: Ice hockey

Tommy Sigurd Skaarberg (born 6 October 1960) is a Norwegian former ice hockey player. He was born in Sarpsborg, Norway and played for the club IL Sparta. He played for the Norwegian national ice hockey team at the 1988 Winter Olympics.
