= Juerg Neuenschwander =

Swiss independent documentary film director, film producer and politician

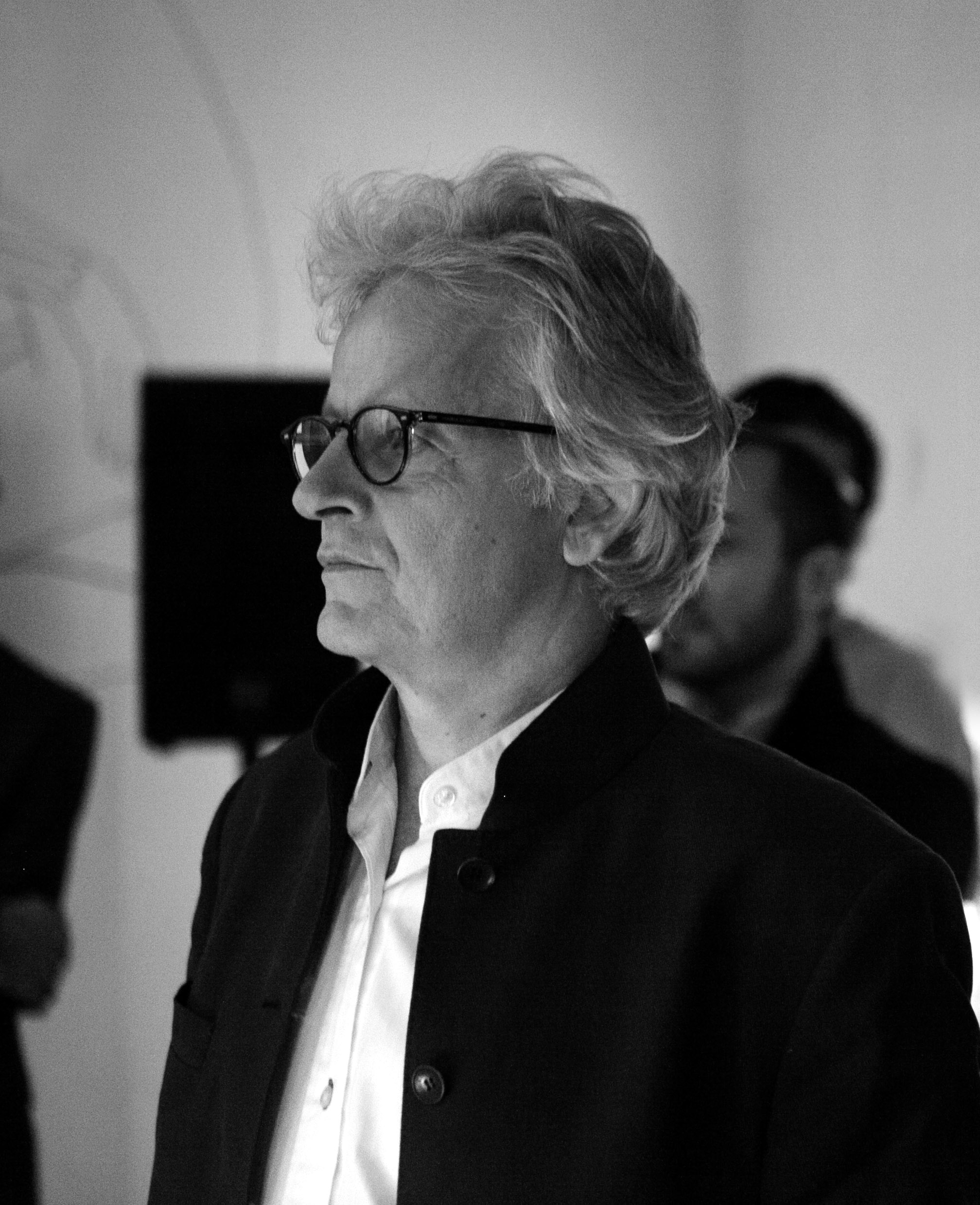
- Juerg Neuenschwander in 2013
- Born: 1953 (age 72–73); Signau, Switzerland
- Education: Primary school in Signau; Diploma in education from the University of Bern, Switzerland; studied psychology at University of Bern, Switzerland
- Occupations: Film director, screenwriter, producer
- Years active: 1978–present
- Notable work: My Mother is in Sri Lanka, (1986, co-directed with Remo Legnazzi); Shigatse – eine Spritze kommt selten allein (An injection never comes alone, 1989-1990); Kräuter und Kräfte (The Power of Healing, 1995); Früher oder später (Sooner or later, 2000-2003); Q – Begegnungen auf der Milchstrasse (Encounters on the Milky Way, 2000)

Juerg Neuenschwander (born 1953) is a Swiss independent documentary film director, film producer, politician and founding member of Container TV AG for film and television in Bern, Switzerland. He is a media consultant and lecturer in film and audiovisual design; director of short and feature-length documentary films, of artistic projects and interactive Multimedia productions.

== Career ==
Documentary films

Juerg Neuenschwander has made a name for himself with cinematic documentaries such as früher oder später (sooner or later), Kräuter und Kräfte (The Power of Healing), and Q – Begegnungen auf der Milchstrasse (Encounters on the Milky Way). He developed and directed a community TV project in Bern's Tscharnergut neighbourhood. He worked on location in Bangladesh, Bolivia, Burkina Faso, China (Tibet), Mali, Nepal, Switzerland and the US.

Lectureships, professorships

Juerg Neuenschwander is an expert and consultant in visual communication, he teaches film studies at Bern University of the Art, a Department of Bern University of Applied Sciences, Bern, Switzerland, (1999 – 2016), and at the College of Design & Innovation D&I, Tongji University, Shanghai, China (visiting professor, 2009 – 2015).

1999–2008 Founder and director of the Media Lab at Bern University of Applied Sciences, Bern, Switzerland.

2016 Juerg Neuenschwander has got a call under the Recruitment Program of Global Experts” (上海千人计划) for three years as an Overseas High-Level Talent National Chair Professor at the College of Arts & Media 艺术于传媒学院 at Tongji University, Shanghai.

Memberships

- 1987–1995, member of the Film Commission of the canton of Bern
- 2005–2008, member of Expert Committee for Non-fiction of Zürich Film Foundation (Zürcher Filmstiftung).

== Select filmography ==
Feature-length documentaries

- Daughters of a Rebel (in preparation)
- Simply different/ Gleich und anders (2011-2016)
- The Chinese Recipe: bold and smart (2012-2016)
- Sooner or later (früher oder später, 2000-2003)
- Encounters on the Milky Way (Q – Begegnungen auf der Milchstrasse, 1998-2000)
- Kräuter und Kräfte (The Power of Healing, 1994-1995)
- Shigatse – eine Spritze kommt selten allein (An injection never comes alone, 1989-1990)
- My Mother is in Sri Lanka (1986, co-directed with Remo Legnazzi)

Television productions, short documentaries

- The Magic of the Chinese Opera (in development)
- Seitenblick (Side Glance, experimental, in development)
- Fear has a Thousand Eyes (Die Angst hat 1000 Augen, 2011, producer)
- Boggsing (Boggsen, 2011)
- Bao, the Upright Judge (Der rechtschaffene Richter BAO, 2011)
- The Swiss Parliament Building (Kuppel über Bern, 2006–09)
- Living with Orangutans (Unter Orang-Utans, 2008)
- Wound Ballistic (2008)
- The World in-between (Zwischenwelt, 2007)
- The Rasheda Trust (2006)
- Amadou’s Friends (Les Amis d’Amadou, 2005)
- Imprisonment (Freiheitsentzug, 1996-1997)
- Hey you! (1998)
- The Promise (Das Versprechen, 1996)
- The Magic of Simulation (Simulationszauber, 1995–96)
- Rasheda – no time for a chat (Rasheda – keine Zeit für einen Schwatz, 1993-1994)
- Confrontation HIV/Aids (Konfrontation HIV/Aids), six episodes (1991-1993)
- Seeing means living (Sehen ist alles, 1991)
- On the mountain (Auf dem Berg, 1993)
- Fri-Art NY- Made in Switzerland, video installation, with Peter Guyer (1984)
- So Berne – Youth on the Street (So Bern – Jugend auf der Strasse, 1980), with Alex Sutter et al.
- Video5 (1978)
- Space to live – Occupation of Houses (Raum zum Leben – Häuserbesetzung, 1975, a fragment)

Awards

- Encounters on the Milky Way (Q – Begegnungen auf der Milchstrasse), Berner Filmpreis for Documentary Film (2002)
- Sooner or later (früher oder später) was nominated for the Documentary Award Pare Lorentz 2003, Los Angeles
