= Andreas Ritsch =

Swiss ice hockey player

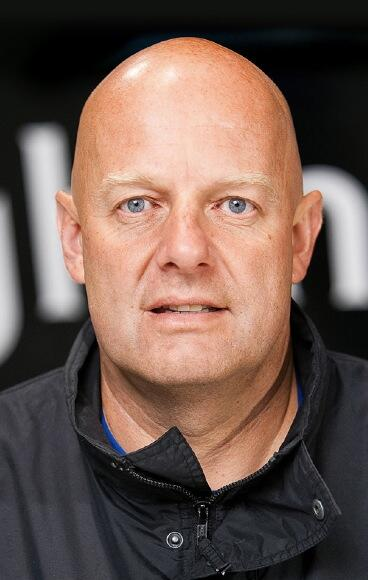
- Born: June 23, 1961 (age 63); Chur, Switzerland
- Height: 5 ft 11 in (180 cm)
- Weight: 185 lb (84 kg; 13 st 3 lb)
- Position: Defence
- Shot: Left
- NLB team Former teams: EHC Chur; NLA; EHC Arosa; HC Lugano; EV Zug; SC Rapperswil-Jona
- National team: Switzerland
- Playing career: 1979–1998

Andreas Ritsch (born June 23, 1961) is a retired Swiss professional ice hockey defenceman who last played for EHC Chur in the National League B. He also represented the Swiss national team at the 1988 Winter Olympics.
