= Marc Leuenberger =

Swiss ice hockey player

- Born: July 24, 1962 (age 63) Saint-Imier, Switzerland
- Height: 5 ft 11 in (180 cm)
- Weight: 185 lb (84 kg; 13 st 3 lb)
- Position: Left wing
- NLA team Former teams: HC Fribourg-Gottéron; EHC Biel
- National team: Switzerland
- Playing career: 1981–1996

Marc Leuenberger (born July 24, 1962) is a former Swiss professional ice hockey left winger who last played for HC Fribourg-Gottéron in Switzerland's National League A.

Leuenberger has participated as a member of the Swiss national team at the 1988 Winter Olympics.
