= Josef Schlickenrieder =

German ice hockey player

Personal information
- Nationality: German
- Born: 7 March 1958 (age 67); Bad Tölz, West Germany

Sport
- Sport: Ice hockey

Josef Schlickenrieder (born 7 May 1958) is a German ice hockey player. He competed in the men's tournament at the 1988 Winter Olympics.
