= 1989–90 Polska Liga Hokejowa season =

Polish ice hockey league season

The 1989–90 Polska Liga Hokejowa season was the 55th season of the Polska Liga Hokejowa, the top level of ice hockey in Poland. 10 teams participated in the league, and Polonia Bytom won the championship.

== First round ==
	Club	GP	W	T	L	Goals	Pts
1.	Polonia Bytom	18	14	3	1	99:36	31
2.	Podhale Nowy Targ	18	13	2	3	107:56	28
3.	Zagłębie Sosnowiec	18	12	1	5	91:54	25
4.	GKS Katowice	18	7	4	7	75:87	18
5.	Towimor Torun	18	8	2	8	75:79	18
6.	Naprzód Janów	18	8	1	9	82:77	17
7.	Unia Oświęcim	18	6	2	10	59:80	14
8.	GKS Tychy	18	6	2	10	73:84	14
9.	KS Cracovia	18	5	3	10	76:95	13
10.	Stoczniowiec Gdansk	18	1	0	17	41:130	2

== Final round ==
	Club	GP	W	T	L	Goals	Pts
1.	Polonia Bytom	28	21	5	2	146:51	47
2.	Zagłębie Sosnowiec	28	17	3	8	136:84	37
3.	Podhale Nowy Targ	28	17	2	9	145:101	36
4.	Naprzód Janów	28	13	1	14	122:118	27
5.	GKS Katowice	28	11	4	13	111:146	26
6.	Towimor Torun	28	10	4	14	109:129	24

== Qualification round ==
	Club	GP	W	T	L	Goals	Pts
7.	KS Cracovia	30	15	3	12	167:141	33
8.	GKS Tychy	30	12	4	14	145:136	28
9.	Unia Oświęcim	30	10	4	16	111:134	24
10.	Stoczniowiec Gdansk	30	2	2	26	76:228	6

== Playoffs ==
=== Quarterfinals ===
- Polonia Bytom - GKS Tychy 2:0 (6:3, 4:3)
- Zagłębie Sosnowiec - KS Cracovia 2:1 (5:1, 2:6, 6:3)
- Podhale Nowy Targ - Towimor Torun 2:0 (6:0, 5:3)
- Naprzód Janów - GKS Katowice 2:1 (1:3, 5:3, 6:3)

=== Semifinals ===
- Polonia Bytom - Naprzód Janów 2:0 (10:2, 7:1)
- Podhale Nowy Targ - Zagłębie Sosnowiec 2:0 (3:2, 5:2)

=== Final ===
- Polonia Bytom - Podhale Nowy Targ 3:0

== Placing round ==
=== 7th place ===
- Towimor Torun - GKS Tychy 6:3

=== 5th place ===
- KS Cracovia - GKS Katowice 4:3

=== 3rd place ===
- Zagłębie Sosnowiec - Naprzód Janów 7:3

== Relegation ==
- Unia Oświęcim - Stoczniowiec Gdansk 2:0 (12:0, 7:2)
