= Christian Brittig =

German ice hockey player

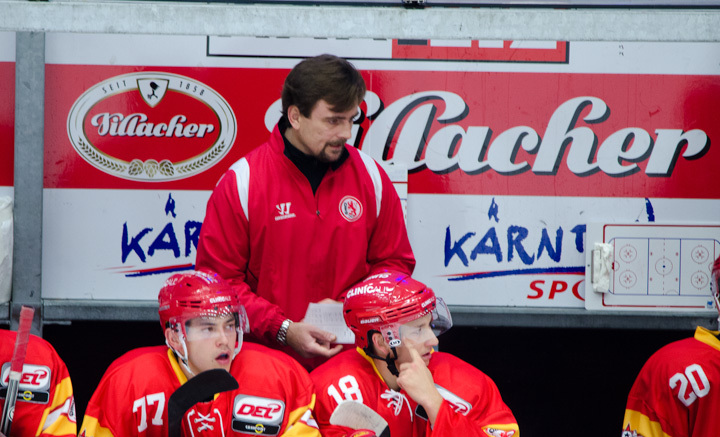

Personal information
- Nationality: German
- Born: 27 March 1966 (age 58); Landshut, West Germany

Sport
- Sport: Ice hockey

Christian Brittig (born 27 March 1966) is a German ice hockey player. He competed in the men's tournament at the 1988 Winter Olympics.
