= Rasmus Hatledal =

Norwegian topographer and military officer

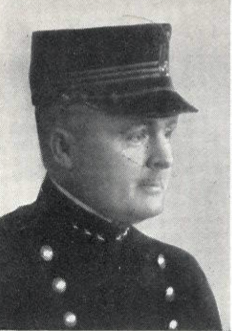
Rasmus Hatledal

Rasmus Hatledal (1 February 1885 – 14 July 1963) was a Norwegian topographer and military officer. He was born in Stryn Municipality. He was appointed colonel and chief of the general staff in 1938. The post-World War II investigation committee, Undersøkelseskommisjonen av 1945, appreciated Hatledal's mobilizing efforts in the 1940 German invasion of Norway. He was decorated Commander of the Order of St. Olav in 1949 and was also Commander of the Swedish Order of the Sword.
