= Jørgen Salsten =

Norwegian ice hockey player (born 1963)

Personal information
- Born: 4 May 1963 (age 63) Oslo, Norway

Sport
- Sport: Ice hockey
- Club: Furuset IF

Jørgen Salsten (born 4 May 1963) is a Norwegian former ice hockey player. He was born in Oslo, Norway, the brother of Petter Salsten, and played for the club Furuset IF. He played for the Norwegian national ice hockey team at the 1988 Winter Olympics.
