= Viel Bjerkeset Andersen =

Norwegian artist

Viel Bjerkeset Andersen (born 20 June 1963) is a Norwegian artist noted for her outdoor installations and photography, especially related to public buildings and structures.

Bjerkeset Andersen grew up in Bærum, with photography as her initial medium. She attended the Norwegian National Academy of Craft and Art Industry, École nationale supérieure des Beaux-Arts, and the Norwegian National Academy of Fine Arts.

She has won several awards and grants for her work, including the Beautiful Roads award, governmental grants from Norway, Finland, and France. Her work includes outdoor exhibits and design at schools, highways, tunnels, and hospitals all over Norway.
