= Andrzej Świątek =

Polish ice hockey player

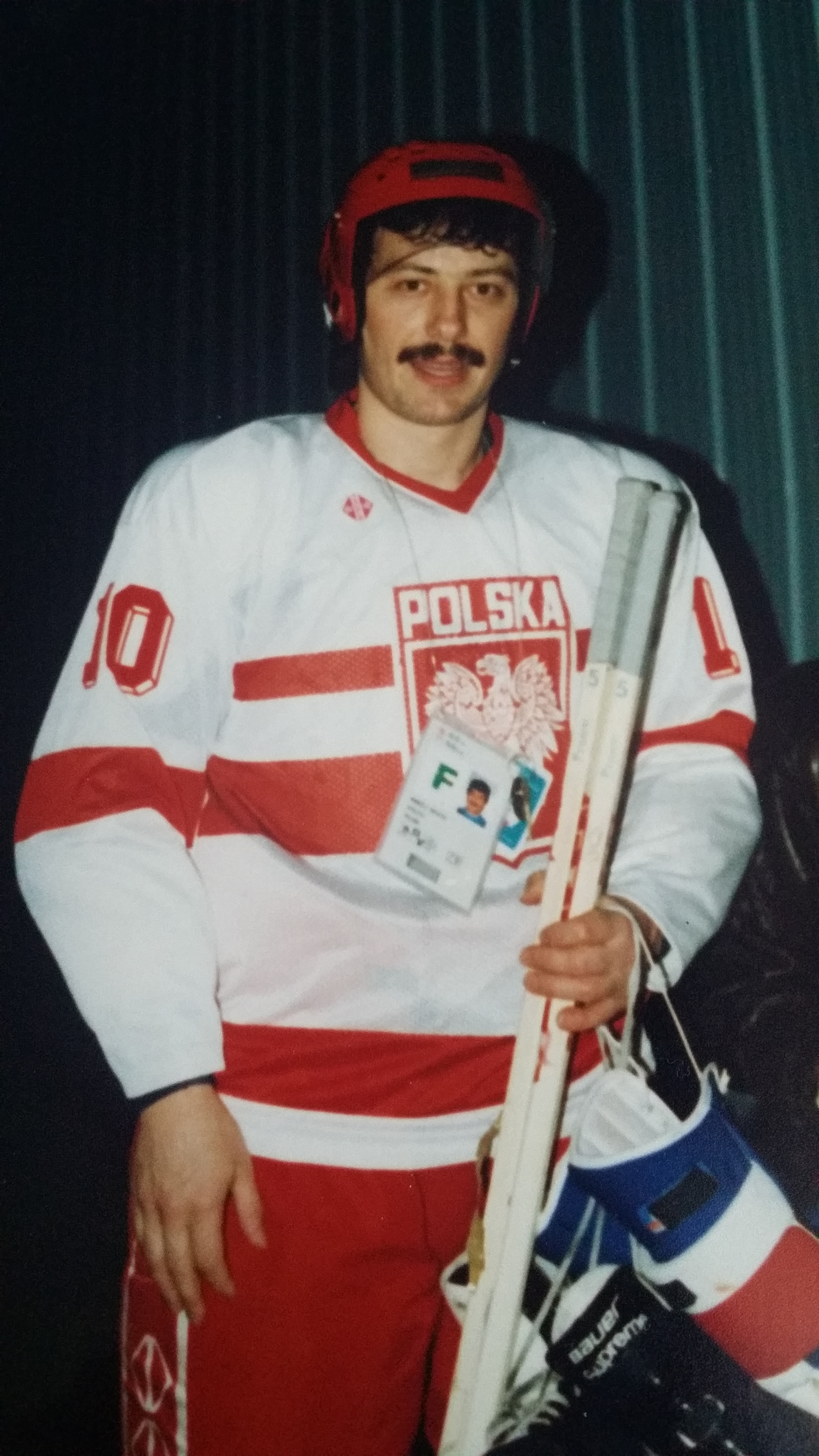
- Born: 7 January 1958 (age 67); Nowy Targ, Poland
- Height: 5 ft 9 in (175 cm)
- Weight: 176 lb (80 kg; 12 st 8 lb)
- Position: Defence
- Played for: Podhale Nowy Targ; Zagłębie Sosnowiec; IFK Arboga IK
- National team: Poland
- Playing career: 1976–1991

Andrzej Świątek (born 7 January 1958) is a Polish former ice hockey player. He played for Podhale Nowy Targ, Zagłębie Sosnowiec, and IFK Arboga IK during his career. Świątek also played for the Polish national team at the 1988 Winter Olympics and several World Championships.
