= Marek Stebnicki =

Polish ice hockey player

- Born: November 11, 1965 (age 60) Dynów, Poland
- Height: 6 ft 0 in (183 cm)
- Weight: 181 lb (82 kg; 12 st 13 lb)
- Position: Centre
- Shot: Right
- Played for: Polonia Bytom; Krefeld Pinguine; Revierlöwen Oberhausen; GKS Katowice; Unia Oświęcim
- National team: Poland
- Playing career: 1984–2005

Marek Stebnicki (born 11 November 1965) is a Polish former ice hockey player. He played for Polonia Bytom, Krefeld Pinguine, Revierlöwen Oberhausen, GKS Katowice, and Unia Oświęcim during his career. He won the Polish league championship in eight times during his career, six with Polonia and two with Unia. Stebnicki also played for the Polish national team at the 1988 Winter Olympics and several World Championships.
