= Ireneusz Pacula =

Polish ice hockey player and coach

- Born: 16 November 1966 (age 58); Mysłowice, Poland
- Height: 5 ft 11 in (180 cm)
- Weight: 198 lb (90 kg; 14 st 2 lb)
- Position: Forward
- Shot: Right
- Played for: Naprzód Janów; ECD Sauerland; ESC Wolfsburg; Mannheimer ERC; EC Kassel; EV Ravensburg; GEC Nordhorn; EHC Straubing
- National team: Poland
- Playing career: 1985–2003

Ireneusz Pacula (born 16 November 1966) is a Polish former ice hockey player and coach. He played for Naprzód Janów, ECD Sauerland, ESC Wolfsburg, Mannheimer ERC, EC Kassel, EV Ravensburg, GEC Nordhorn, and EHC Straubing during his career. He also played for the Polish national team at the 1988 Winter Olympics and the 1987 and 1992 World Championships.
