= Piotr Kwasigroch =

Polish ice hockey player and coach

- Born: June 1, 1962 (age 62); Katowice, Poland
- Height: 5 ft 9 in (175 cm)
- Weight: 163 lb (74 kg; 11 st 9 lb)
- Position: Forward
- Shot: Left
- Played for: Naprzód Janów; Kölner EC; EV Füssen; Kassel Huskies; GEC Nordhorn; EV Landsberg; Neusser EV
- National team: Poland
- Playing career: 1980–2003

Piotr Kwasigroch (born 1 June 1962) is a Polish former ice hockey player and coach. He played for Naprzód Janów, Kölner EC, EV Füssen, the Kassel Huskies, GEC Nordhorn, EV Landsberg, and Neusser EV during his career. After nine years in the Polish league, Kwasigroch was allowed to move to West Germany, spending the rest of his career with German teams, and turning to coaching near the end. He also played for the Polish national team at the 1988 Winter Olympics and the 1986 and 1989 World Championships.

== Playing career ==
Kwasigroch scored 572 points during his playing career in Germany. He is currently the 5th highest-scoring Polish forward in Deutsche Eishockey Liga (DEL) history, with 65 points scored across his 138 games for the Kassel Huskies. He was part of the Kölner EC team that finished runners up in the 1991 and 1993 DEL seasons, scoring 152 points across 180 games for the club.

He played 39 games for Poland at international competitions including as part of the Polish team that recorded a historic victory in 1986 against the then-defending World Champions Czechoslovakia.
