= Andrzej Hanisz =

Polish ice hockey player

- Born: 3 February 1962 (age 63); Katowice, Poland
- Height: 6 ft 0 in (183 cm)
- Weight: 163 lb (74 kg; 11 st 9 lb)
- Position: Goaltender
- Played for: DEL; EC Ratingen; EC Hannover
- National team: Poland
- NHL draft: Undrafted
- Playing career: 1986–2004

Andrzej Hanisz (born 3 February 1962) is a Polish former ice hockey goaltender. He is currently serving as a goaltender coach in Germany.

Hanisz was a member of the Poland men's national ice hockey team which competed at the 1988 Winter Olympics held in Calgary, Alberta, Canada. He was also a member of the Polish national team that competed at the 1992 Men's World Ice Hockey Championships held in Czechoslovakia.
