= Krzysztof Podsiadło =

Polish ice hockey player and coach

- Born: 16 February 1962 (age 63); Sosnowiec, Poland
- Height: 5 ft 9 in (175 cm)
- Weight: 187 lb (85 kg; 13 st 5 lb)
- Position: Forward
- Played for: Zagłębie Sosnowiec; Antjärns IK; GKS Tychy; Cracovia; GKS Katowice; SMS Warszawa
- National team: Poland
- Playing career: 1980–2003

Krzysztof Władysław Podsiadło (born 16 February 1962) is a Polish former ice hockey game player and coach. He played for Zagłębie Sosnowiec, Antjärns IK, GKS Tychy, Cracovia, GKS Katowice, and SMS Warszawa during his career. He also played for the Polish national team at the 1988 Winter Olympics and five World Championships. After his playing career he turned to coaching.

== Career ==
- POL KH Zagłębie Sosnowiec (1980–1990)
- SWE AIK Härnösand (1990–1993)
- POL GKS Tychy (1993–1995)
- POL Naprzód Janów (1995–1996)
- POL Cracovia (1996–1997)
- POL GKS Katowice (1997–1999)
- POL SMS Warszawa (1999)
- POL KH Zagłębie Sosnowiec (1999–2003)
