= Jarosław Morawiecki =

Polish ice hockey player and coach

- Born: March 11, 1964 (age 61) Siemianowice Śląskie, Poland
- Height: 5 ft 7 in (170 cm)
- Weight: 176 lb (80 kg; 12 st 8 lb)
- Position: Centre
- Shot: Left
- Played for: Zagłębie Sosnowiec; KKH Katowice; Olofströms IK; Drakkars de Caen; TKH Toruń
- National team: Poland
- Playing career: 1981–2003

Jarosław Józef Morawiecki (born 11 March 1964) is a Polish former ice hockey player and coach. He played for Zagłębie Sosnowiec, KKH Katowice, Olofströms IK, Drakkars de Caen, and TKH Toruń during his career. He also played for the Polish national team at the 1988 Winter Olympics and the 1986 and 1986 World Championships.

== Doping ==
During the 1988 Olympics Morawiecki tested positive for a banned substance. The result saw Poland forfeit their goals in the previous game, a 6–2 win over France, which was Poland's only win at the Olympics. The Polish team contested the test, suggesting that Morawiecki, the team's best player until that point, had been sabotaged, though could provide no evidence. Later Morawiecki suggested he ate tainted borscht, and was given the nickname "Barszczyk" ("Borschty" in Polish). He was given an 18-month suspension by the International Ice Hockey Federation (IIHF), the governing body of international ice hockey, which was upheld in Poland. Upon his return to play in the Polish league in 1989–90 he again tested positive for banned substances, and was given a lifetime suspension, though it was rescinded in 1992. After that Morawiecki played abroad in Sweden and France, returning to Poland in 1997 and finishing his career there in 2003.

== Post-playing career ==
After retiring from playing Moawiecki became a coach, and has coached the Polish under-18 and junior (under-20) team on several occasions, as well as TKH Toruń and SMS Sosnowiec.
