= Mirosław Copija =

Polish ice hockey player

- Born: August 1, 1965 (age 59); Bielsko-Biała, Poland
- Height: 6 ft 1 in (185 cm)
- Weight: 181 lb (82 kg; 12 st 13 lb)
- Position: Centre
- Shot: Left
- Played for: Podhale Nowy Targ; SMS Warszawa; GKS Tychy
- National team: Poland
- Playing career: 1984–2002

Mirosław Piotr Copija (born 1 August 1965), is a Polish former ice hockey player. He played for Podhale Nowy Targ, SMS Warszawa, and GKS Tychy during his career. He also played for the Polish national team at the 1988 Winter Olympics and 1989 World Championship, and several lower division tournaments. With Podhale he won the Polish league championship five years in a row, from 1993 to 1997.
