= Franciszek Kukla =

Polish ice hockey player (born 1953)

- Born: July 16, 1953 (age 72); Bytom, Poland
- Height: 6 ft 1 in (185 cm)
- Weight: 209 lb (95 kg; 14 st 13 lb)
- Position: Goaltender
- Caught: Left
- Played for: Polonia Bytom; KHK Red Star
- National team: Poland
- Playing career: 1966–1989

Franciszek Kukla (born 16 July 1953), is a Polish former ice hockey player. He mainly played for Polonia Bytom during his career, with one season for KHK Red Star in Yugoslavia. He also played for the Polish national team at the 1988 Winter Olympics and several World Championships.
