= Rune Gulliksen =

Norwegian ice hockey player

Rune Gulliksen (born January 23, 1963) is a former Norwegian ice hockey player. He was born in Fredrikstad, Norway. He played for the Norwegian national ice hockey team at the 1988 and 1992 Winter Olympics.
