= Lars Knutsen =

Lars Egbert Knutsen (1884–1963) was a shipowner and founder of Lars Knutsen and Sons Limited, a ship chandler business located in The Strand, Swansea, South Wales. The company did exist under new management as Lars Knutsen and Clode, but in 2011, the owner David Thompson, sold the company to Hutton's and Co.

Lars Knutsen was born in Arendal, Norway. He married Lilli Stray (1894–1983) in Kristiansand Norway in 1919 before emigrating to the UK. His half brother Konrad Knutsen, who emigrated to Seattle, Washington, United States, was said to be involved in the invention of the carburetor, at the time a major advance in the technology of the internal combustion engine.
