= Jerzy Potz =

Polish ice hockey player

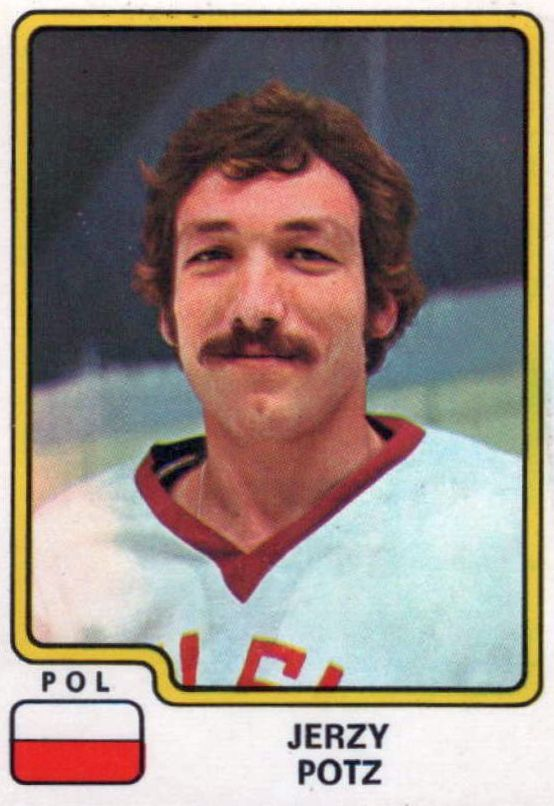
- Born: February 1, 1953; Łódź, Poland
- Died: January 27, 2000 (aged 46); Frankfurt, Germany
- Height: 5 ft 11 in (180 cm)
- Weight: 187 lb (85 kg; 13 st 5 lb)
- Position: Defence
- Shot: Left
- Played for: ŁKS Łódź; Frankfurt Lions; Rote Teufel Bad Nauheim
- National team: Poland
- NHL draft: Undrafted
- Playing career: 1971–1989

Jerzy Andrzej Potz (February 1, 1953 – January 27, 2000) was a Polish ice hockey player. He played for the Poland men's national ice hockey team at the 1972 Winter Olympics in Sapporo, the 1976 Winter Olympics in Innsbruck, the 1980 Winter Olympics in Lake Placid, and the 1988 Winter Olympics in Calgary.

He also represented his country at the IIHF World Championships eleven times. In total, he played 189 games for the Polish national team.

He played in Poland for ŁKS Łódź from 1971–1982, before joining the German club, the Frankfurt Lions. He played for Frankfurt until 1988, when he joined Rote Teufel Bad Nauheim. He would play one year for the club before retiring in 1990.
