= Philipp Neuenschwander =

Swiss ice hockey player

- Born: December 29, 1964 (age 60); Switzerland
- Height: 6 ft 2 in (188 cm)
- Weight: 201 lb (91 kg; 14 st 5 lb)
- Position: Forward
- NLA team Former teams: EV Zug; HC Davos
- National team: Switzerland
- Playing career: 1981–1997

Philipp Neuenschwander (born December 29, 1964) is a retired Swiss professional ice hockey forward who last played for EV Zug in the National League A. He also represented the Swiss national team at the 1988 Winter Olympics.
