= Roman Steblecki =

Polish ice hockey player

- Born: March 16, 1963 (age 62); Skarżysko-Kamienna, Poland
- Height: 6 ft 2 in (188 cm)
- Weight: 172 lb (78 kg; 12 st 4 lb)
- Position: Forward
- Played for: Cracovia; Hockey Club de Reims; Nittorps IK; Kristianstads IK
- National team: Poland
- Playing career: 1985–1997

Roman Steblecki (born 16 March 1963) is a Polish former ice hockey player. He played for Cracovia, Hockey Club de Reims, Nittorps IK, and Kristianstads IK during his career. Steblecki also played for the Poland national team at the 1988 Winter Olympics. His son Sebastian is a footballer.
