= Andrzej Kądziołka =

Polish ice hockey player

- Born: 12 October 1960 (age 64); Oświęcim, Poland
- Height: 5 ft 11 in (180 cm)
- Weight: 190 lb (86 kg; 13 st 8 lb)
- Position: Defence
- Played for: Unia Oświęcim; Polonia Bytom
- National team: Poland
- Playing career: 1972–1996

Andrzej Kądziołka (born 12 October 1960) is a Polish former ice hockey player. He played for Unia Oświęcim and Polonia Bytom during his career. He also played for the Polish national team at the 1988 and 1992 Winter Olympics, and multiple World Championships. With Polonia he won the Polish league championship six times.
