= 2004 IIHF World U18 Championships =

2004 IIHF World U18 Championship

Tournament details
- Host country: Belarus
- Venues: 2 (in 1 host city)
- Dates: 8–18 April 2004
- Teams: 10

Final positions
- Champions: Russia (2nd title)
- Runners-up: United States
- Third place: Czech Republic
- Fourth place: Canada

Tournament statistics
- Games played: 31
- Goals scored: 186 (6 per game)
- Scoring leader(s): (Finland) Lauri Korpikoski (Finland) Petteri Nokelainen (Finland) Lauri Tukonen (Russia) Roman Voloshenko (11 points)

The 2004 IIHF World U18 Championships were held in Minsk, Belarus. The championships began on April 8, 2004, and finished on April 18, 2004. Games were played at the Ice Palace and Palace sport in Minsk. Russia defeated the United States 3–2 in the final to claim the gold medal, while the Czech Republic defeated Canada 3–2 to capture the bronze medal.

== Championship results ==
=== Preliminary round ===
==== Group A ====
Pos	Team	Pld	W	D	L	GF	GA	GD	Pts	Qualification
1	United States	4	4	0	0	22	5	+17	8	Semifinals
2	Canada	4	3	0	1	15	5	+10	6	Quarterfinals
3	Sweden	4	2	0	2	8	12	−4	4	Quarterfinals
4	Denmark	4	1	0	3	8	10	−2	2	Relegation round
5	Belarus (H)	4	0	0	4	3	24	−21	0	Relegation round

(H) Hosts

8 April 2004; 15:00	Denmark	2–5 (0–0, 1–3, 1–2)	United States	Minsk Sports Palace, Minsk; Attendance: 1,200

Game reference

8 April 2004; 19:00	Sweden	0–5 (0–1, 0–1, 0–3)	Canada	Minsk Sports Palace, Minsk; Attendance: 3,400

Game reference

9 April 2004; 19:00	Belarus	1–4 (0–1, 1–2, 0–1)	Denmark	Minsk Sports Palace, Minsk; Attendance: 3,500

Game reference

10 April 2004; 15:00	United States	6–2 (3–0, 3–1, 0–1)	Sweden	Minsk Sports Palace, Minsk; Attendance: 3,000

Game reference

10 April 2004; 19:00	Canada	7–2 (3–1, 2–1, 2–0)	Belarus	Minsk Sports Palace, Minsk; Attendance: 3,500

Game reference

11 April 2004; 17:00	Denmark	1–2 (1–1, 0–1, 0–0)	Canada	Minsk Sports Palace, Minsk; Attendance: 3,150

Game reference

12 April 2004; 15:00	Sweden	2–1 (0–0, 1–0, 1–1)	Denmark	Minsk Sports Palace, Minsk; Attendance: 2,800

Game reference

12 April 2004; 15:00	United States	9–0 (2–0, 4–0, 3–0)	Belarus	Minsk Sports Palace, Minsk; Attendance: 3,500

Game reference

13 April 2004; 15:00	Canada	1–2 (0–0, 1–0, 0–2)	United States	Minsk Sports Palace, Minsk; Attendance: 3,200

Game reference

13 April 2004; 19:00	Belarus	0–4 (0–2, 0–0, 0–2)	Sweden	Minsk Sports Palace, Minsk; Attendance: 3,500

Game reference

==== Group B ====
Pos	Team	Pld	W	D	L	GF	GA	GD	Pts	Qualification
1	Russia	4	2	2	0	16	9	+7	6	Semifinals
2	Czech Republic	4	1	3	0	10	3	+7	5 (Note: Czech Republic 1–1 Slovakia)	Quarterfinals
3	Slovakia	4	1	3	0	13	7	+6	5	Quarterfinals
4	Finland	4	1	2	1	14	8	+6	4	Relegation round
5	Norway	4	0	0	4	6	32	−26	0	Relegation round

Notes:

8 April 2004; 15:00	Norway	4–8 (1–2, 1–3, 2–3)	Russia	Minsk Ice Palace, Minsk; Attendance: 1,400

Game reference

8 April 2004; 19:00	Czech Republic	1–1 (0–0, 1–0, 0–1)	Slovakia	Minsk Ice Palace, Minsk; Attendance: 1,400

Game reference

9 April 2004; 15:00	Finland	9–0 (1–0, 4–0, 4–0)	Norway	Minsk Ice Palace, Minsk; Attendance: 1,750

Game reference

10 April 2004; 15:00	Russia	1–1 (0–0, 1–0, 0–1)	Czech Republic	Minsk Ice Palace, Minsk; Attendance: 1,800

Game reference

10 April 2004; 19:00	Slovakia	2–2 (0–1, 1–1, 1–0)	Finland	Minsk Ice Palace, Minsk; Attendance: 1,100

Game reference

11 April 2004; 15:00	Norway	2–8 (0–2, 1–2, 1–4)	Slovakia	Minsk Ice Palace, Minsk; Attendance: 1,800

Game reference

12 April 2004; 15:00	Czech Republic	7–0 (4–0, 1–0, 2–0)	Norway	Minsk Ice Palace, Minsk; Attendance: 1,600

Game reference

12 April 2004; 19:00	Russia	5–2 (2–0, 0–1, 3–1)	Finland	Minsk Ice Palace, Minsk; Attendance: 2,000

Game reference

13 April 2004; 15:00	Finland	1–1 (1–0, 0–0, 0–1)	Czech Republic	Minsk Ice Palace, Minsk; Attendance: 1,700

Game reference

13 April 2004; 19:00	Slovakia	2–2 (2–0, 0–1, 0–1)	Russia	Minsk Ice Palace, Minsk; Attendance: 1,750

Game reference

=== Relegation round ===
Pos	Team	Pld	W	D	L	GF	GA	GD	Pts	Relegation
7	Finland	3	3	0	0	18	3	+15	6	
8	Denmark	3	2	0	1	12	9	+3	4	
9	Belarus (H)	3	1	0	2	7	12	−5	2	2005 Division I
10	Norway	3	0	0	3	7	20	−13	0	2005 Division I

(H) Hosts

15 April 2004; 15:00	Denmark	7–4 (3–1, 0–1, 4–2)	Norway	Minsk Ice Palace, Minsk; Attendance: 1,500

Game reference

15 April 2004; 19:00	Finland	5–2 (2–1, 2–0, 1–1)	Belarus	Minsk Ice Palace, Minsk; Attendance: 1,600

Game reference

16 April 2004; 15:00	Denmark	1–4 (1–2, 0–1, 0–1)	Finland	Minsk Ice Palace, Minsk; Attendance: 1,600

Game reference

16 April 2004; 19:00	Belarus	4–3 (0–1, 1–1, 3–1)	Norway	Minsk Ice Palace, Minsk; Attendance: 1,500

Game reference

=== Final round ===
==== Bracket ====
Quarterfinals
B2	Czech Republic	5
A3	Sweden	1
A2	Canada	3
B3	Slovakia	1

Semifinals
A1	United States	3
B2	Czech Republic	2
B1	Russia	5
A2	Canada	2

Final
A1	United States	2
B1	Russia	3
Third place
B2	Czech Republic	3
A2	Canada	2

==== Quarterfinals ====
15 April 2004; 15:00	Canada	3–1 (2–0, 0–1, 1–0)	Slovakia	Minsk Sports Palace, Minsk; Attendance: 3,200

Game reference

Devan Dubnyk
Goalies
Michal Valent
Referee:
(Czech Republic) Milan Minář
Linesmen:
(United States) Joseph Ross
(Sweden) Anders Karlberg

Chipchura (McGrath, Garlock) (PP2) – 08:44	1–0
Chipchura (Sigalet) (PP) – 16:21	2–0
	2–1	31:22 – Tománek (Zagrapan)
McGrath (Byers) – 44:44	3–1

18 min
Penalties
28 min
21
Shots
34

15 April 2004; 19:00	Czech Republic	5–1 (1–1, 2–0, 2–0)	Sweden	Minsk Sports Palace, Minsk; Attendance: 3,300

Game reference

Marek Schwarz
Goalies
Magnus Åkerlund
Referee:
(Canada) Terry Hobor
Linesmen:
(Canada) Chris De Haan
(Slovakia) Miroslav Valach

Birner (Krejčí) – 12:30	1–0
	1–1	13:12 – Bergfors (Olausson)
Birner (Bahenský) – 20:34	2–1
Krejčí (Šmíd) – 21:29	3–1
M. Pšurný – 44:28	4–1
M. Pšurný (R. Pšurný, Šindel)– 49:56	5–1

6 min
Penalties
6 min
36
Shots
20

==== Semifinals ====
16 April 2004; 15:00	United States	3–2 (1–0, 2–2, 0–0)	Czech Republic	Minsk Sports Palace, Minsk; Attendance: 3,400

Game reference

Cory Schneider
Goalies
Marek Schwarz
Referee:
(Russia) Anatoli Zakharov
Linesmen:
(Slovakia) Miroslav Valach
(Canada) Chris De Haan

Lerg (Gerbe) (PP) – 10:25	1–0
	1–1	21:09 – Gulasi (Krejčí, Šindel)
Fritsche (Porter, Scero) (PP) – 28:25	2–1
Kessel (Skille, Auffrey) – 33:42	3–1
	3–2	36:35 – Daneček (Balán) (PP)

24 min
Penalties
12 min
21
Shots
36

16 April 2004; 19:00	Russia	5–2 (1–0, 2–2, 0–0)	Canada	Minsk Sports Palace, Minsk; Attendance: 3,500

Game reference

Anton Khudobin
Goalies
Devan Dubnyk
Referee:
(United States) David Hansen
Linesmen:
(Sweden) Anders Karlberg
(United States) Joseph Ross

Shitikov (Malkin) (PP) – 10:48	1–0
	1–1	12:23 – Lammers (Sigalet) (PP)
Belov (Dzhugelia, Voloshenko) (PP) – 14:36	2–1
Shirokov (Malkin, Radulov) – 18:36	3–1
Voloshenko (Yunkov, Radulov) – 29:30	4–1
Malkin (Radulov, Voloshenko) – 41:02	5–1
	5–2	47:15 – Berti (Garlock) (PP)

53 min
Penalties
28 min
21
Shots
29

==== Fifth place game ====
17 April 2004; 15:00	Slovakia	4–5 (2–2, 1–2, 1–1)	Sweden	Minsk Sports Palace, Minsk; Attendance: 3,000

Game reference

Michal Valent
Goalies
Daniel Larsson
Referee:
(United States) David Hansen
Linesmen:
(Czech Republic) Jaromír Bláha
(Belarus) Valeri Gotsoulia

Zagrapan (Handlovský) – 05:54	1–0
	1–1	08:23 – Karlsson (Wikner)
Tománek (Zagrapan) – 14:15	2–1
	2–2	18:20 – Enström (Bergfors) (PP)
	2–3	26:30 – Hedman (Enström, Hellström) (PP)
	2–4	30:36 – J. Andersson (Näslund)
Sekera (Valábik) (PP) – 32:14	3–4
	3–5	49:33 – Enström (Hellström, Demén-Willaume)
Handlovský (Ščurko) – 50:46	4–5

8 min
Penalties
8 min
30
Shots
22

==== Bronze medal game ====
18 April 2004; 13:00	Czech Republic	3–2 (1–0, 1–2, 1–0)	Canada	Minsk Sports Palace, Minsk; Attendance: 3,500

Game reference

Marek Schwarz
Goalies
Devan Dubnyk
Referee:
(Russia) Anatoli Zakharov
Linesmen:
(Switzerland) Tobias Wehrli
(Belarus) Andrei Vasko

Šindel (Šmíd, Birner) (PP) – 08:33	1–0
Birner (Krejčí) (SH) – 26:08	2–0
	2–1	34:57 – Garlock (Rogers) (PP)
	2–2	35:29 – Reddox (Cabana)
R. Pšurný (Balán) – 46:13	3–2

20 min
Penalties
20 min
24
Shots
29

==== Final ====
18 April 2004; 17:00	United States	2–3 (1–0, 0–1, 1–2)	Russia	Minsk Sports Palace, Minsk; Attendance: 3,500

Game reference

Cory Schneider
Goalies
Anton Khudobin
Referee:
(Czech Republic) Milan Minář
Linesmen:
(Canada) Chris De Haan
(Slovakia) Miroslav Valach

Hagemo (Porter) (PP) – 15:57	1–0
	1–1	26:53 – Lyamin (Parshin)
	1–2	44:54 – Voloshenko (Yunkov)
	1–3	46:00 – Shitikov (Malkin)
Kessel (Hagemo) (PP) – 58:22	2–3

30 min
Penalties
28 min
25
Shots
26

=== Final standings ===
Rk.	Team
1st place, gold medalist(s)	Russia
2nd place, silver medalist(s)	United States
3rd place, bronze medalist(s)	Czech Republic
4	Canada
5	Sweden
6	Slovakia
7	Finland
8	Denmark
9	Belarus
10	Norway

Belarus and Norway are relegated to Division I for the 2005 IIHF World U18 Championships.

=== Statistics ===
==== Scoring leaders ====
Pos	Player	Country	GP	G	A	Pts	+/−	PIM
1	Lauri Korpikoski	Finland	6	5	6	11	+7	2
1	Lauri Tukonen	Finland	6	5	6	11	+7	10
1	Petteri Nokelainen	Finland	6	5	6	11	+5	16
1	Roman Voloshenko	Russia	6	5	6	11	+6	18
5	Phil Kessel	United States	6	7	3	10	+3	6
6	Peter Regin	Denmark	6	5	4	9	+6	0
7	Roman Tománek	Slovakia	6	7	1	8	+6	6
8	Marek Zagrapan	Slovakia	6	4	4	8	+9	8
8	Evgeni Malkin	Russia	6	4	4	8	+4	31
10	Morten Madsen	Denmark	6	3	5	8	+5	2

GP = Games played; G = Goals; A = Assists; Pts = Points; +/− = Plus–minus; PIM = Penalties in minutes
Source: IIHF

==== Goaltending leaders ====
(minimum 40% team's total ice time)

Pos	Player	Country	TOI	GA	GAA	SA	Sv%	SO
1	Marek Schwarz	Czech Republic	419:21	9	1.29	148	93.92	1
2	Cory Schneider	United States	350:31	10	1.71	141	92.91	1
3	Tuukka Rask	Finland	298:42	8	1.61	110	92.73	1
4	Devan Dubnyk	Canada	356:50	12	2.02	145	91.72	1
5	Anton Khudobin	Russia	360:00	13	2.17	152	91.45	0

TOI = Time On Ice (minutes:seconds); GA = Goals against; GAA = Goals against average; SA = Shots against; Sv% = Save percentage; SO = Shutouts
Source: IIHF

=== Awards ===
- Best players selected by the Directorate:
  - Best Goaltender: (Czech Republic) Marek Schwarz
  - Best Defenceman: (United States) Zach Jones
  - Best Forward: (Russia) Evgeni Malkin

Source: IIHF

- Media All-Stars:
  - Goaltender: (Russia) Anton Khudobin
  - Defencemen: (Canada) Andy Rogers / (Czech Republic) Ladislav Šmíd
  - Forwards: (Canada) Liam Reddox / (Russia) Evgeni Malkin / (United States) Phil Kessel

== Division I ==
Division I consisted of two separate tournaments. The Group A tournament was held between 27 March and 2 April 2004 in Amstetten, Austria and the Group B tournament was held between 29 March and 4 April 2004 in Asiago, Italy. Switzerland and Germany won the Group A and Group B tournaments respectively and gained promotion to the Championship Division for the 2005 IIHF World U18 Championships. While Romania finished last in Group A and South Korea last in Group B and were both relegated to Division II for 2005.

Final standings

Group A

1. Switzerland — promoted to the Championship Division for 2005
2. Slovenia
3. Austria
4. Latvia
5. Poland
6. Romania — relegated to Division II for 2004

Group B

1. Germany — promoted to the Championship Division for 2004
2. Japan
3. Italy
4. Kazakhstan
5. France
6. South Korea — relegated to Division II for 2004

== Division II ==
Division II consisted of two separate tournaments. The Group A tournament was held between 28 March and 3 April 2004 in Debrecen, Hungary and the Group B tournament was held between 1 and 7 March 2004 in Elektrėnai and Kaunas, Lithuania. Ukraine and Great Britain won the Group A and Group B tournaments respectively and gained promotion to Division I for the 2005 IIHF World U18 Championships. While Belgium finished last in Group A and Australia last in Group B and were both relegated to Division III for 2005.

Final standings

Group A

1. Ukraine — promoted to Division I for 2005
2. Hungary
3. Netherlands
4. Spain
5. Iceland
6. Belgium — relegated to Division III for 2005

Group B

1. Great Britain — promoted to Division I for 2005
2. Estonia
3. Croatia
4. Lithuania
5. Serbia and Montenegro
6. Australia — relegated to Division III for 2005

== Division III ==
The Division III tournament was held between 6 and 14 March 2004 in Sofia, Bulgaria. Mexico and South Africa finished first and second respectively and both gained promotion to Division II for the 2005 IIHF World U18 Championships. While Turkey and Bosnia and Herzegovina finished sixth and seventh respectively and were relegated to the Division III Qualification tournament for 2005.

Final standings

1. Mexico — promoted to Division II for 2005
2. South Africa — promoted to Division II for 2005
3. New Zealand
4. Bulgaria
5. Israel
6. Turkey — relegated to Division III Qualification for 2005
7. Bosnia and Herzegovina — relegated to Division III Qualification for 2005
