= Pšurný =

Pšurný (feminine: Pšurná) is a Czech surname. Notable people with the surname include:

- Michal Pšurný (born 1986), Czech ice hockey player
- Roman Pšurný (born 1986), Czech ice hockey player
