= Michal Birner =

Czech ice hockey player (born 1986)

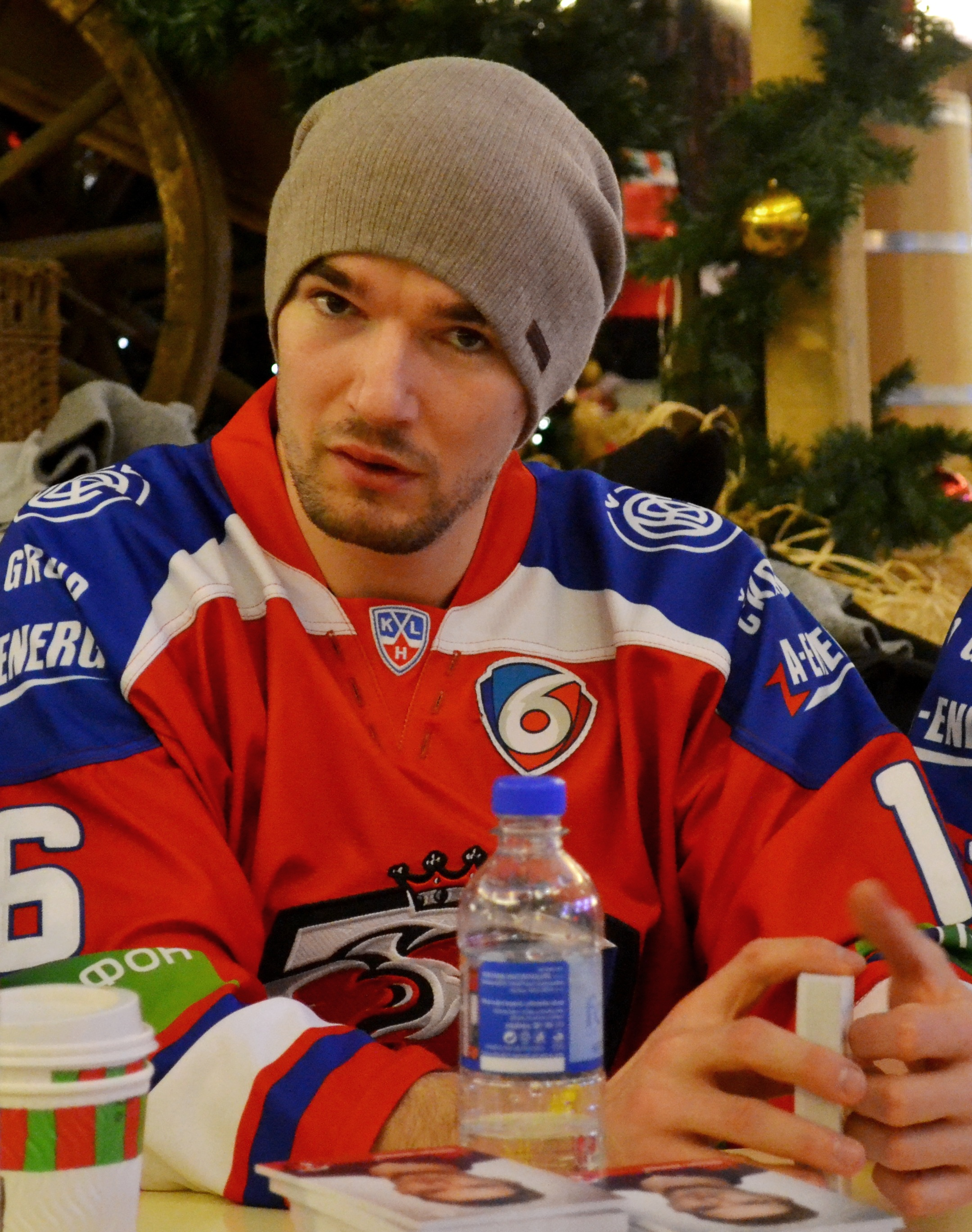
- Birner in 2013
- Born: 2 March 1986 (age 40) Litoměřice, Czechoslovakia
- Height: 6 ft 0 in (183 cm)
- Weight: 183 lb (83 kg; 13 st 1 lb)
- Position: Winger
- Shot: Left
- Played for: HC Slavia Praha; Peoria Rivermen; Portland Pirates; Iowa Chops; Pelicans; Turku TPS; HC Lev Praha; KalPa; Traktor Chelyabinsk; HC Fribourg-Gottéron; HC Bílí Tygři Liberec
- National team: Czech Republic
- NHL draft: 116th overall, 2004; St. Louis Blues
- Playing career: 2006–2024

Michal Birner (born 2 March 1986) is a Czech former professional ice hockey player.

== Playing career ==
Birner was drafted 116th overall in the 2004 NHL entry draft by the St. Louis Blues. Prior to being drafted in the NHL, Birner was a CHL Import Draft- Barrie Colts 1st Round(8th) 2004

On 15 December 2007, the Blues traded Birner, along with Doug Weight and a 7th round draft choice to the Anaheim Ducks for Andy McDonald. Birner was assigned to the Ducks affiliate, the Portland Pirates where he remained for the rest of the 2007–08 season.

Birner started the 2008–09 season with the Iowa Chops before he was assigned to ECHL affiliate the Bakersfield Condors on 20 November 2008. Birner didn't report to the Condors and returned to Europe to play in the Finnish SM-liiga with Pelicans on 27 November 2008. Birner's season was cut short as he suffered a fractured hand after playing in only 6 games.

On 7 July 2009, Birner was signed by TPS for the 2009–10 season.

After two seasons with HC Lev Prague of the Kontinental Hockey League, with the team unable to offer him a new contract due to financial bankruptcy, Birner returned to continue his professional career in Finland, joining his third Liiga club KalPa on a one-year deal on 15 July 2014.

== Career statistics ==
=== Regular season and playoffs ===
			Regular season					Playoffs
Season	Team	League	GP	G	A	Pts	PIM	GP	G	A	Pts	PIM
2000–01	HC Slavia Praha	CZE U18	48	16	24	40	20	7	0	1	1	6
2001–02	HC Slavia Praha	CZE U18	46	24	34	58	28	2	1	0	1	0
2002–03	HC Slavia Praha	CZE U18	5	5	6	11	14	5	4	3	7	20
2002–03	HC Slavia Praha	CZE U20	31	4	8	12	10	3	1	0	1	2
2003–04	HC Slavia Praha	CZE U20	55	25	35	60	112	2	0	1	1	4
2003–04	HC Slavia Praha	ELH	1	0	0	0	0	—	—	—	—	—
2004–05	Barrie Colts	OHL	28	4	10	14	12	—	—	—	—	—
2004–05	Saginaw Spirit	OHL	31	7	21	28	29	—	—	—	—	—
2005–06	Saginaw Spirit	OHL	60	31	54	85	91	4	1	3	4	8
2006–07	Peoria Rivermen	AHL	66	11	17	28	20	—	—	—	—	—
2007–08	Peoria Rivermen	AHL	18	2	5	7	4	—	—	—	—	—
2007–08	Portland Pirates	AHL	40	7	6	13	14	15	2	1	3	6
2008–09	Iowa Chops	AHL	2	0	0	0	0	—	—	—	—	—
2008–09	Pelicans	SM-l	6	0	2	2	14	—	—	—	—	—
2009–10	TPS	SM-l	58	15	30	45	38	15	4	6	10	22
2010–11	TPS	SM-l	48	4	13	17	24	—	—	—	—	—
2011–12	TPS	SM-l	60	11	14	25	36	2	2	0	2	2
2012–13	TPS	SM-l	10	4	3	7	10	—	—	—	—	—
2012–13	HC Lev Praha	KHL	24	1	3	4	8	2	1	2	3	0
2013–14	HC Lev Praha	KHL	40	5	5	10	12	13	1	3	4	8
2014–15	KalPa	Liiga	60	15	21	36	32	6	2	1	3	0
2015–16	Bílí Tygři Liberec	ELH	51	13	26	39	69	13	2	9	11	18
2016–17	Traktor Chelyabinsk	KHL	12	0	1	1	6	—	—	—	—	—
2016–17	HC Fribourg–Gottéron	NLA	31	9	23	32	8	—	—	—	—	—
2017–18	HC Fribourg–Gottéron	NL	39	9	20	29	22	5	3	2	5	0
2018–19	HC Fribourg–Gottéron	NL	9	0	3	3	4	—	—	—	—	—
2018–19	Bílí Tygři Liberec	ELH	32	9	19	28	26	17	7	6	13	8
2019–20	Bílí Tygři Liberec	ELH	41	20	41	61	12	—	—	—	—	—
2020–21	Bílí Tygři Liberec	ELH	50	14	31	45	38	15	4	12	16	10
2021–22	Bílí Tygři Liberec	ELH	53	12	22	34	4	6	3	0	3	4
2022–23	Bílí Tygři Liberec	ELH	50	15	22	37	32	10	2	3	5	2
2023–24	Bílí Tygři Liberec	ELH	43	5	10	15	4	9	2	3	5	6
ELH totals			321	88	171	259	185	70	20	33	53	48
Liiga totals			242	49	83	132	154	23	8	7	15	24
KHL totals			76	6	9	15	26	15	2	5	7	8

Medal record

Representing Czech Republic

Ice hockey

IIHF U18 Championships
Bronze medal – third place	2004 Minsk	

=== International ===
Year	Team	Event	Result	GP	G	A	Pts	PIM
2003	Czech Republic	U18	3rd place, bronze medalist(s)	5
2004	Czech Republic	WJC18	3rd place, bronze medalist(s)	7	3	2	5	8
2006	Czech Republic	WJC	6th	6	0	2	2	4
2016	Czech Republic	WC	5th	8	4	3	7	0
2016	Czech Republic	WCH	6th	2	0	0	0	0
2017	Czech Republic	WC	7th	8	0	1	1	0
2018	Czech Republic	OG	4th	6	0	3	3	0
Junior totals				13	3	4	7	12
Senior totals				24	4	7	11	0
