= Stanislav Balán =

Czech ice hockey player

- Born: 30 January 1986 (age 40) Hodonín, TCH
- Height: 6 ft 1 in (185 cm)
- Weight: 176 lb (80 kg; 12 st 8 lb)
- Position: Forward
- Shot: Left
- Czech 2.liga team Former teams: SHK Hodonín; PSG Zlín; HC Lev Poprad; HK Poprad; HC Karlovy Vary; HC Vítkovice Steel; HK Dukla Trenčín
- NHL draft: 209th overall, 2004; Nashville Predators
- Playing career: 2004–2022

Stanislav Balán (born 30 January 1986) is a Czech professional ice hockey forward for SHK Hodonín of the 2nd Czech Republic Hockey League. He was selected by the Nashville Predators in the 7th round (209th overall) of the 2004 NHL entry draft but did not play.

== Career statistics ==
=== Regular season and playoffs ===
			Regular season					Playoffs
Season	Team	League	GP	G	A	Pts	PIM	GP	G	A	Pts	PIM
2000–01	HC Barum Continental Zlín	CZE U18	1	0	0	0	2	—	—	—	—	—
2001–02	HC Continental Zlín	CZE U18	46	21	23	44	60	4	1	1	2	0
2002–03	HC Hamé Zlín	CZE U18	27	23	24	47	75	3	2	0	2	12
2002–03	HC Hamé Zlín	CZE U20	21	4	7	11	8	—	—	—	—	—
2003–04	HC Hamé Zlín	CZE U20	53	23	33	56	120	5	2	0	2	31
2003–04	HC Hamé Zlín	ELH	4	1	0	1	2	—	—	—	—	—
2004–05	HC Hamé Zlín	CZE U20	37	10	13	23	131	2	0	0	0	2
2004–05	SHK Hodonín	CZE.3	5	3	2	5	20	—	—	—	—	—
2005–06	Portland Winter Hawks	WHL	67	14	23	37	102	12	1	4	5	18
2006–07	HC Hamé Zlín	ELH	44	4	3	7	48	5	0	0	0	2
2006–07	SK Horácká Slavia Třebíč	CZE.2	7	3	2	5	12	—	—	—	—	—
2007–08	RI Okna Zlín	ELH	46	2	6	8	46	—	—	—	—	—
2007–08	HK Jestřábi Prostějov	CZE.2	2	1	0	1	2	—	—	—	—	—
2008–09	RI Okna Zlín	ELH	46	5	3	8	61	4	0	0	0	0
2008–09	HC Dukla Jihlava	CZE.2	5	4	3	7	4	—	—	—	—	—
2009–10	PSG Zlín	ELH	52	5	11	16	85	6	0	2	2	4
2010–11	PSG Zlín	ELH	50	8	8	16	30	4	0	3	3	4
2011–12	HC Lev Poprad	KHL	16	1	1	2	4	—	—	—	—	—
2011–12	HC Lev Poprad	SVK	26	10	16	26	38	6	1	2	3	32
2012–13	HC Lev Poprad	SVK	43	16	31	47	108	7	0	6	6	18
2013–14	HC Energie Karlovy Vary	ELH	41	12	19	31	67	—	—	—	—	—
2014–15	HC Energie Karlovy Vary	ELH	51	13	18	31	96	—	—	—	—	—
2015–16	HC Vítkovice Steel	ELH	45	13	11	24	74	—	—	—	—	—
2016–17	HC Vítkovice Ridera	ELH	30	1	1	2	42	5	1	1	2	2
2017–18	HC Energie Karlovy Vary	CZE.2	38	12	19	31	78	18	3	7	10	12
2018–19	HC Energie Karlovy Vary	ELH	49	5	7	12	56	—	—	—	—	—
2019–20	SHK Drtiči Hodonín	CZE.3	17	6	23	29	26	3	0	3	3	6
2019–20	HK Dukla Trenčín	SVK	20	3	6	9	6	—	—	—	—	—
2020–21	SHK Drtiči Hodonín	CZE.3	6	2	1	3	6	—	—	—	—	—
2020–21	HK Skalica	SVK.2	19	8	11	19	49	—	—	—	—	—
2021–22	SHK Drtiči Hodonín	CZE.3	20	6	8	14	42	—	—	—	—	—
ELH totals			458	69	87	156	607	24	1	6	7	12

=== International ===
Year	Team	Event	GP	G	A	Pts	PIM
2003	Czech Republic	U18	5
2004	Czech Republic	WJC18	7	0	2	2	2
Junior totals			7	0	2	2	2
