= Gulasi =

Gulasi is a surname. Notable people with the surname include:

- David Gulasi, Australian social media figure
- Michal Gulasi (born 1986), Czech ice hockey player
