= Zdeněk Bahenský =

Czech ice hockey player

- Born: March 10, 1986 (age 40) Most, Czechoslovakia
- Height: 6 ft 2 in (188 cm)
- Weight: 201 lb (91 kg; 14 st 5 lb)
- Position: Forward
- Shot: Left
- Played for: Hartford Wolf Pack; HC Karlovy Vary; HC Litvínov; BK Mladá Boleslav; HC Sparta Praha; HC Nové Zámky; Scorpions de Mulhouse; KS Cracovia; Saskatoon Blades
- NHL draft: 73rd overall, 2004; New York Rangers
- Playing career: 2006–2020

Zdeněk Bahenský (born March 10, 1986) is a Czech former professional ice hockey player. He was selected by the New York Rangers in the 3rd round (73rd overall) of the 2004 NHL entry draft.

Bahensky played with HC Sparta Praha in the Czech Extraliga during the 2010–11 Czech Extraliga season.

== Career statistics ==
=== Regular season and playoffs ===
			Regular season					Playoffs
Season	Team	League	GP	G	A	Pts	PIM	GP	G	A	Pts	PIM
2000–01	HC Chemopetrol	CZE U18	43	8	6	14	26	6	0	0	0	6
2001–02	HC Chemopetrol	CZE U18	46	16	17	33	102	2	0	0	0	0
2002–03	HC Chemopetrol	CZE U18	3	2	2	4	4	—	—	—	—	—
2002–03	HC Chemopetrol	CZE U20	31	4	2	6	8	—	—	—	—	—
2003–04	HC Chemopetrol	CZE U20	52	14	15	29	204	2	1	1	2	14
2004–05	Saskatoon Blades	WHL	66	14	17	31	101	4	0	0	0	2
2005–06	Saskatoon Blades	WHL	65	19	36	55	76	10	2	5	7	16
2006–07	Hartford Wolf Pack	AHL	13	0	1	1	4	2	0	0	0	0
2006–07	Charlotte Checkers	ECHL	58	9	14	23	118	4	0	1	1	0
2007–08	HC Litvínov	ELH	23	3	2	5	30	5	0	0	0	0
2007–08	HC Energie Karlovy Vary	ELH	10	1	0	1	10	—	—	—	—	—
2007–08	HC Most	CZE.2	9	3	0	3	14	—	—	—	—	—
2008–09	HC Litvínov	ELH	50	5	3	8	46	4	1	1	2	8
2008–09	HC Most	CZE.2	1	0	1	1	30	—	—	—	—	—
2009–10	BK Mladá Boleslav	ELH	48	7	5	12	103	—	—	—	—	—
2009–10	HC Vrchlabí	CZE.2	2	0	0	0	4	—	—	—	—	—
2010–11	BK Mladá Boleslav	ELH	52	10	7	17	57	—	—	—	—	—
2011–12	BK Mladá Boleslav	ELH	47	17	7	24	83	—	—	—	—	—
2012–13	HC Sparta Praha	ELH	52	10	8	18	63	7	1	3	4	2
2013–14	HC Sparta Praha	ELH	19	2	1	3	4	1	0	0	0	0
2013–14	HC Stadion Litoměřice	CZE.2	22	6	10	16	18	5	0	0	0	24
2014–15	HC Sparta Praha	ELH	18	1	0	1	16	—	—	—	—	—
2014–15	Rytíři Kladno	ELH	10	3	2	5	4	—	—	—	—	—
2014–15	HC Energie Karlovy Vary	ELH	8	0	2	2	6	—	—	—	—	—
2015–16	HC Slavia Praha	CZE.2	46	12	12	24	44	20	3	1	4	8
2016–17	HC Nové Zámky	SVK	22	2	9	11	8	—	—	—	—	—
2016–17	WSV Sterzing Broncos	AlpsHL	9	8	9	17	20	—	—	—	—	—
2017–18	WSV Sterzing Broncos	AlpsHL	23	7	13	20	22	—	—	—	—	—
2018–19	CSM Corona Brașov	EL	3	0	1	1	2	—	—	—	—	—
2018–19	CSM Corona Brașov	ROU	5	1	5	6	12	—	—	—	—	—
2018–19	Scorpions de Mulhouse	FRA	12	7	2	9	31	—	—	—	—	—
2019–20	Cracovia Kraków	POL	22	7	4	11	20	7	1	2	3	32
2022–23	HC Tábor	CZE.3	14	1	4	5	6	—	—	—	—	—
ELH totals			327	56	35	91	418	17	2	4	6	10

=== International ===
Year	Team	Event	GP	G	A	Pts	PIM
2003	Czech Republic	U18	5
2004	Czech Republic	WJC18	7	1	3	4	6
2006	Czech Republic	WJC	6	0	1	1	10
Junior totals			13	1	4	5	16
