= Mikhail Yunkov =

Russian ice hockey player (born 1986)

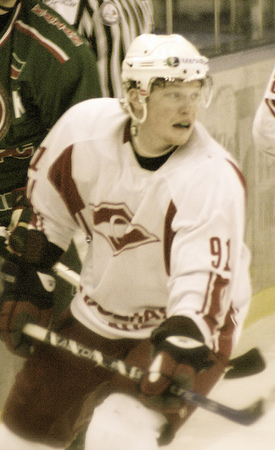
- Born: February 16, 1986 (age 40) Voskresensk, Russian SFSR, Soviet Union
- Height: 6 ft 0 in (183 cm)
- Weight: 207 lb (94 kg; 14 st 11 lb)
- Position: Centre
- Shoots: Left
- VHL team Former teams: Khimik Voskresensk; Krylya Sovetov Moscow; Spartak Moscow; Ak Bars Kazan; Metallurg Magnitogorsk; CSKA Moscow; Avangard Omsk; HC Sochi; Salavat Yulaev Ufa; Severstal Cherepovets
- NHL draft: 62nd overall, 2004; Washington Capitals
- Playing career: 2001–present

Mikhail Yunkov (Russian: Михаил Юньков; born February 16, 1986, in Voskresensk, USSR) is a former Russian professional ice hockey forward. Yunkov has appeared in over 500 games in the Kontinental Hockey League (KHL). In the 2004 NHL entry draft, Mikhail was drafted 62nd overall in the 2nd round by the Washington Capitals. He is the brother of Alexander Yunkov, who also played ice hockey professionally.

== Career statistics ==
=== Regular season and playoffs ===
			Regular season					Playoffs
Season	Team	League	GP	G	A	Pts	PIM	GP	G	A	Pts	PIM
2001–02	Krylya Sovetov–2 Moscow	RUS.3	4	0	1	1	0	—	—	—	—	—
2002–03	Krylya Sovetov Moscow	RSL	7	1	0	1	2	—	—	—	—	—
2002–03	Krylya Sovetov–2 Moscow	RUS.3	20	2	6	8	0	—	—	—	—	—
2003–04	Krylya Sovetov Moscow	RUS.2	38	5	10	15	12	4	0	1	1	0
2003–04	Krylya Sovetov–2 Moscow	RUS.3	10	4	1	5	6	—	—	—	—	—
2004–05	Krylya Sovetov Moscow	RUS.2	38	9	14	23	22	3	0	1	1	4
2004–05	Krylya Sovetov–2 Moscow	RUS.3	2	0	0	0	0	—	—	—	—	—
2005–06	Ak Bars Kazan	RSL	33	3	4	7	35	11	0	1	1	6
2005–06	Ak Bars–2 Kazan	RUS.3	1	1	4	5	0	—	—	—	—	—
2006–07	Ak Bars Kazan	RSL	47	3	6	9	12	14	1	2	3	8
2006–07	Ak Bars–2 Kazan	RUS.3	2	0	2	2	0	—	—	—	—	—
2007–08	Spartak Moscow	RSL	57	4	6	10	20	5	1	0	1	6
2008–09	Spartak Moscow	KHL	54	7	14	21	30	6	0	2	2	6
2008–09	Molot–Prikamye Perm	RUS.2	—	—	—	—	—	2	1	1	2	2
2009–10	Ak Bars Kazan	KHL	32	0	3	3	12	4	0	1	1	2
2010–11	Spartak Moscow	KHL	47	6	7	13	22	4	0	3	3	4
2011–12	Spartak Moscow	KHL	49	8	10	18	24	—	—	—	—	—
2012–13	Spartak Moscow	KHL	40	5	11	16	14	—	—	—	—	—
2013–14	Spartak Moscow	KHL	43	5	9	14	63	—	—	—	—	—
2013–14	Metallurg Magnitogorsk	KHL	9	0	2	2	2	21	4	4	8	6
2014–15	Metallurg Magnitogorsk	KHL	55	4	7	11	12	10	0	0	0	8
2015–16	CSKA Moscow	KHL	22	1	1	2	8	11	2	2	4	4
2016–17	Avangard Omsk	KHL	50	3	4	7	36	12	2	1	3	10
2017–18	HC Sochi	KHL	2	2	1	3	0	—	—	—	—	—
2017–18	Salavat Yulaev Ufa	KHL	24	2	0	2	4	6	2	0	2	0
2018–19	Severstal Cherepovets	KHL	13	0	2	2	2	—	—	—	—	—
2019–20	Spartak Moscow	KHL	50	7	7	14	12	6	0	1	1	2
2020–21	Spartak Moscow	KHL	52	2	9	11	8	—	—	—	—	—
2021–22	Khimik Voskresensk	VHL	17	1	0	1	12	—	—	—	—	—
RSL totals			144	11	16	27	69	30	2	3	5	20
KHL totals			542	52	87	139	249	80	10	14	24	42

=== International ===
Year	Team	Event	Result	GP	G	A	Pts	PIM
2003	Russia	U18	2nd place, silver medalist(s)	5	1	1	2	2
2004	Russia	WJC18	1st place, gold medalist(s)	6	0	4	4	8
2005	Russia	WJC	2nd place, silver medalist(s)	6	1	1	2	0
2006	Russia	WJC	2nd place, silver medalist(s)	6	0	0	0	4
Junior totals				23	2	6	8	14

== Awards and honours ==
Award	Year
RSL
Championship (Ak Bars Kazan)	2006
KHL
Gagarin Cup (Ak Bars Kazan)	2010
Gagarin Cup (Metallurg Magnitogorsk)	2014
