= Ryan Garlock =

Canadian ice hockey player

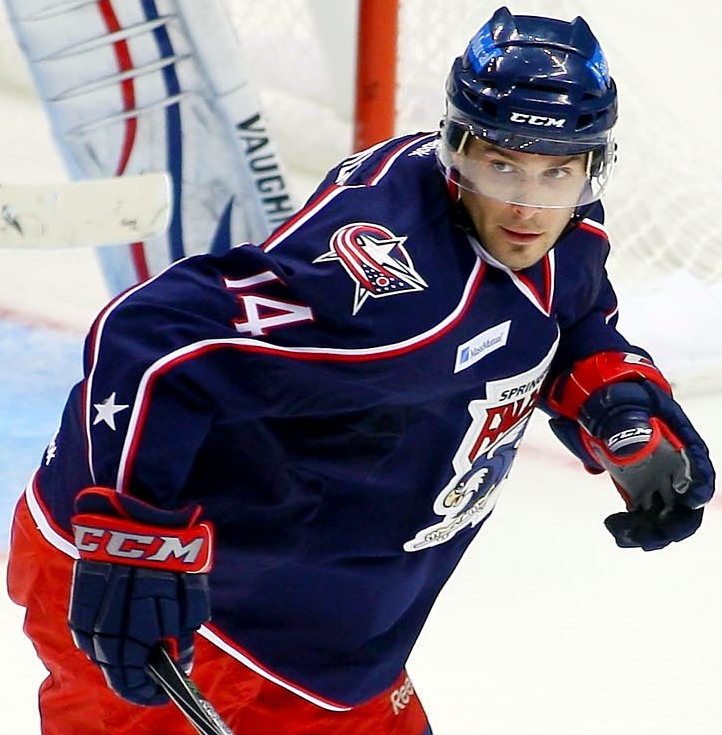
- Garlock with the Springfield Falcons in 2011
- Born: April 24, 1986 (age 40) Iroquois Falls, Ontario, Canada
- Height: 6 ft 0 in (183 cm)
- Weight: 202 lb (92 kg; 14 st 6 lb)
- Position: Centre
- Shot: Left
- Played for: San Antonio Rampage; Binghamton Senators; Springfield Falcons; Hershey Bears; Syracuse Crunch; Hartford Wolf Pack; Connecticut Whale; Valerenga IF
- NHL draft: 45th overall, 2004; Chicago Blackhawks
- Playing career: 2006–2014

Ryan Garlock (born April 24, 1986) is a Canadian former professional ice hockey player. He most notably played in the American Hockey League (AHL).

== Playing career ==
Garlock was drafted 45th overall in the 2004 NHL entry draft by the Chicago Blackhawks from the OHL. Garlock entered the Ontario Hockey League in 2002 after being drafted in the 1st Round (13th overall) by the Guelph Storm. He was traded to the Windsor Spitfires in January 2004 as Guelph prepared for a long playoff run.

Garlock had a slow start with Windsor, as he struggled with injuries and tried to find his place on the team. He had a very quiet playoff, only scoring one goal against London. Still, he was selected to play in the 2004 CHL Top Prospects Game and to play for Team Canada at the 2004 IIHF World U18 Championships, in Minsk.

Returning to Windsor, Garlock played two more seasons with the Spitfires averaging just under 1 point per game. He was traded to the Saginaw Spirit during the off season of 2006 but never played for them.

Heading into the spring of 2006, Garlock remained unsigned by the Blackhawks and, when the deadline passed for them to sign him, he could have re-entered the draft but, instead, opted to become an unrestricted free agent.

As the 2006 NHL training camp season opened, Garlock was invited to Phoenix to take part in their camp. As a result, Garlock was signed to a one-year contract with Phoenix's top AHL affiliate, the San Antonio Rampage.

In the 2007–08 season, after trying out for the AHL's Binghamton Senators, Garlock was signed by the ECHL's Johnstown Chiefs on 15 October 2007. He also had short contract stints with the Springfield Falcons and the Hershey Bears. Garlock started the 2008–09 season with the Chiefs but was signed by affiliate club, the Syracuse Crunch, and played most of the season in the AHL.

On July 20, 2009, Garlock was signed by the Hartford Wolf Pack of the AHL.

Garlock started the 2011–12 AHL season with the Springfield Falcons on a professional tryout agreement, and on October 18, 2011 was rewarded when he was signed by the team to a standard American Hockey League contract for the remainder of the season. In his second tenure with the Falcons, Garlock played in 71 games for 18 points.

On June 28, 2012, Garlock now noted with veteran status in the AHL, was offered limited opportunity in the AHL, and subsequently signed his first European contract on a one-year deal with Norwegian club Valerengens IF of the GET-ligaen.

Garlock returned to North America, signing with the Greenville Road Warriors of the ECHL on September 12, 2013. However, on October 23, 2013, before even playing a game with Greenville, he was traded to the Bakersfield Condors. On January 14, 2014, Garlock was traded for the second time of the season, this time to the San Francisco Bulls. Two weeks after getting traded though, on January 27, 2014, the San Francisco Bulls announced they were ceasing operations effective immediately, leaving Garlock and all players on an ECHL contract with San Francisco as free agents.

== Career statistics ==
=== Regular season and playoffs ===
			Regular season					Playoffs
Season	Team	League	GP	G	A	Pts	PIM	GP	G	A	Pts	PIM
2002–03	Guelph Storm	OHL	51	3	12	15	26	11	1	1	2	0
2003–04	Guelph Storm	OHL	36	16	18	34	32	—	—	—	—	—
2003–04	Windsor Spitfires	OHL	16	3	10	13	12	4	1	0	1	6
2004–05	Windsor Spitfires	OHL	68	33	35	68	62	1	0	0	0	2
2005–06	Windsor Spitfires	OHL	62	20	32	52	66	7	2	3	5	18
2006–07	San Antonio Rampage	AHL	71	3	9	12	42	—	—	—	—	—
2007–08	Johnstown Chiefs	ECHL	51	26	35	61	61	6	4	4	8	4
2007–08	Binghamton Senators	AHL	3	0	1	1	2	—	—	—	—	—
2007–08	Springfield Falcons	AHL	6	0	1	1	4	—	—	—	—	—
2007–08	Hershey Bears	AHL	5	0	1	1	4	—	—	—	—	—
2008–09	Johnstown Chiefs	ECHL	16	10	8	18	24	—	—	—	—	—
2008–09	Syracuse Crunch	AHL	35	4	1	5	19	—	—	—	—	—
2009–10	Charlotte Checkers	ECHL	4	1	2	3	0	6	4	4	8	4
2009–10	Hartford Wolf Pack	AHL	59	7	13	20	38	—	—	—	—	—
2010–11	Hartford Wolf Pack/CT Whale	AHL	71	3	18	21	50	4	0	1	1	2
2011–12	Springfield Falcons	AHL	71	5	13	18	40	—	—	—	—	—
2012–13	Vålerenga Ishockey	NOR	21	4	11	15	28	—	—	—	—	—
2013–14	Bakersfield Condors	ECHL	8	1	2	3	2	—	—	—	—	—
2013–14	San Francisco Bulls	ECHL	3	1	1	2	0	—	—	—	—	—
AHL totals			321	22	57	79	199	4	0	1	1	2

=== International ===
Year	Team	Event	Result	GP	G	A	Pts	PIM
2003	Canada	U18	4th	5	1	1	2	2
2004	Canada	WJC18	4th	7	1	4	5	6
Junior totals				12	2	5	7	8
