= David Krejčí =

Czech ice hockey player (born 1986)

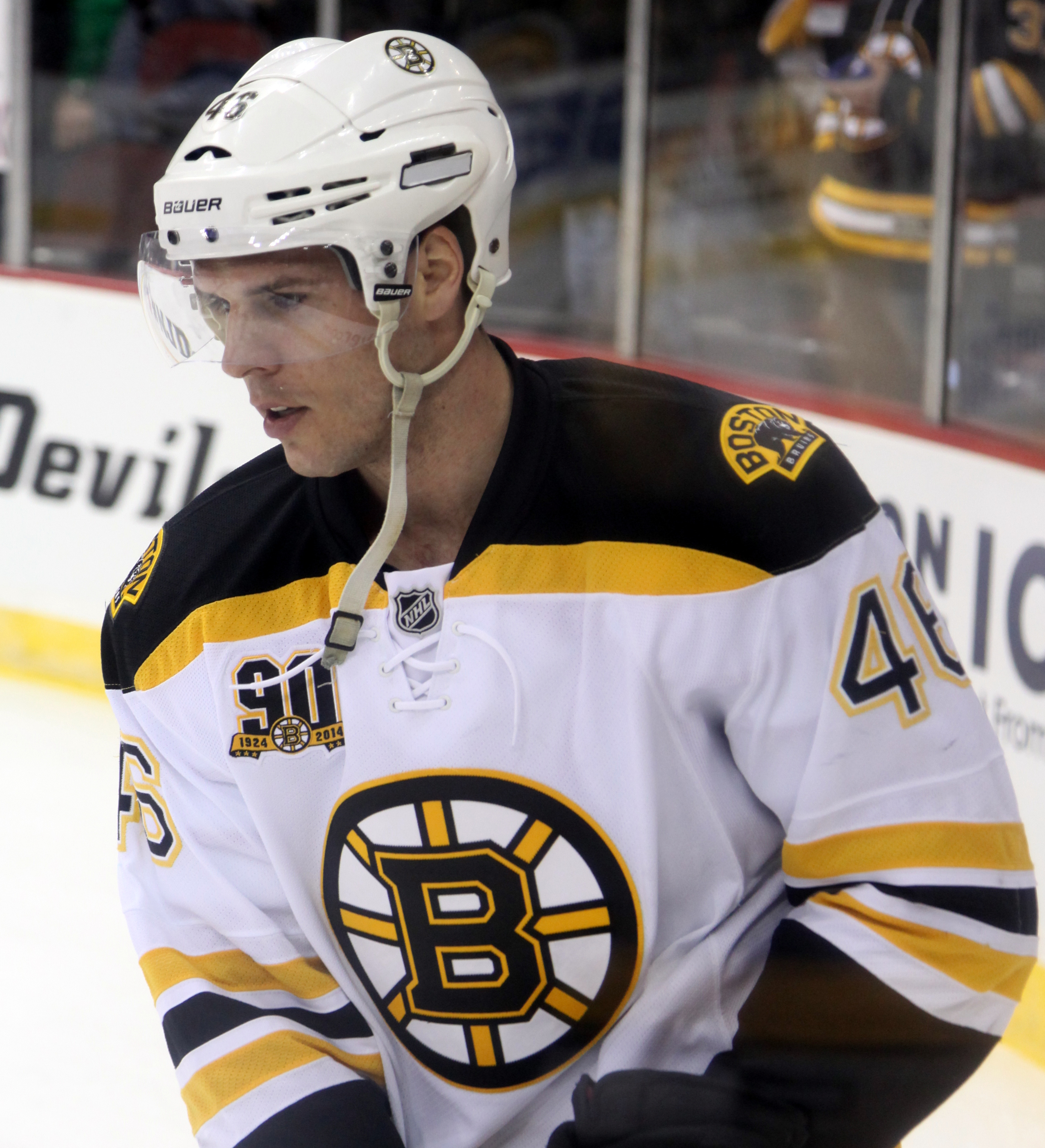
- Krejčí with the Boston Bruins in March 2014
- Born: 28 April 1986 (age 40) Šternberk, Czechoslovakia
- Height: 6 ft 0 in (183 cm)
- Weight: 188 lb (85 kg; 13 st 6 lb)
- Position: Centre
- Shot: Right
- Played for: Boston Bruins; HC Pardubice; HC Olomouc
- National team: Czech Republic
- NHL draft: 63rd overall, 2004; Boston Bruins
- Playing career: 2006–2023

David Krejčí (Czech pronunciation: [ˈdavɪt ˈkrɛjtʃiː], born 28 April 1986) is a Czech former professional ice hockey centre who played 16 seasons in the National Hockey League with the Boston Bruins. He was part of the Bruins' Stanley Cup win in 2011 and led the NHL in points during the 2011 and 2013 Stanley Cup playoffs. Internationally he played for the Czech national team at several tournaments, including the 2010, 2014, and 2022 Winter Olympics and four World Championships.

== Early life ==
David Krejčí was born on April 28, 1986, in Šternberk, a small town in the Moravia region of what was then Czechoslovakia and is now the Czech Republic. He is the son of Zdeněk and Renata Krejčí, and has an older brother, Zdeněk jr. His father was also a hockey player and later became a coach.

== Playing career ==
Krejčí started playing junior hockey with HC Olomouc U18 in the Czechia U18 league during the 2000–01 season, he scored 2 goals and 6 assists in 26 games. During the 2001–02 campaign, he was one of the leagues top scorers with 32 goals and 27 assists in 48 games. In 2002–03, he scored 46 points (16 goals and 30 assists) in 27 games while also debuting with Třinec's U20 squad, where he scored 9 points in 12 games.

Krejčí was drafted by the Boston Bruins in the third round, 63rd overall, of the 2004 NHL entry draft. He was drafted out of Czech junior leagues, having played for HC Kladno. Following his selection, he moved to North America to play major junior hockey in the Quebec Major Junior Hockey League (QMJHL) for the Gatineau Olympiques for two seasons. In his two seasons in Gatineau, Krejčí played in 117 games recording 49 goals 144 points.

=== Professional ===
==== Boston Bruins (2006–2021) ====
Krejčí turned professional in 2006–07, playing for the Bruins' American Hockey League (AHL) affiliate, the Providence Bruins. He played in his first NHL game on 30 January 2007 in a 7–1 loss against the Buffalo Sabres but suffered a concussion after being hit by Buffalo's Adam Mair during his third shift. He recorded just 2:07 minutes of ice time. Krejčí played increasingly with Boston the following season, appearing in 56 NHL games to go with 25 games for Providence. On 19 February 2008, Krejčí was involved in a shootout tie-breaker round in a Bruins road game against the Carolina Hurricanes and scored to help the Bruins take the shootout 2–1. Krejčí's shootout tally would not register as his first NHL goal, as shootout goals do not count towards a player's statistical totals. Krejčí scored his first official NHL goal one week later, on 26 February against Martin Gerber of the Ottawa Senators, the second Bruins' goal in a 4–0 home shutout. He finished his rookie NHL season with 6 goals and 27 points.

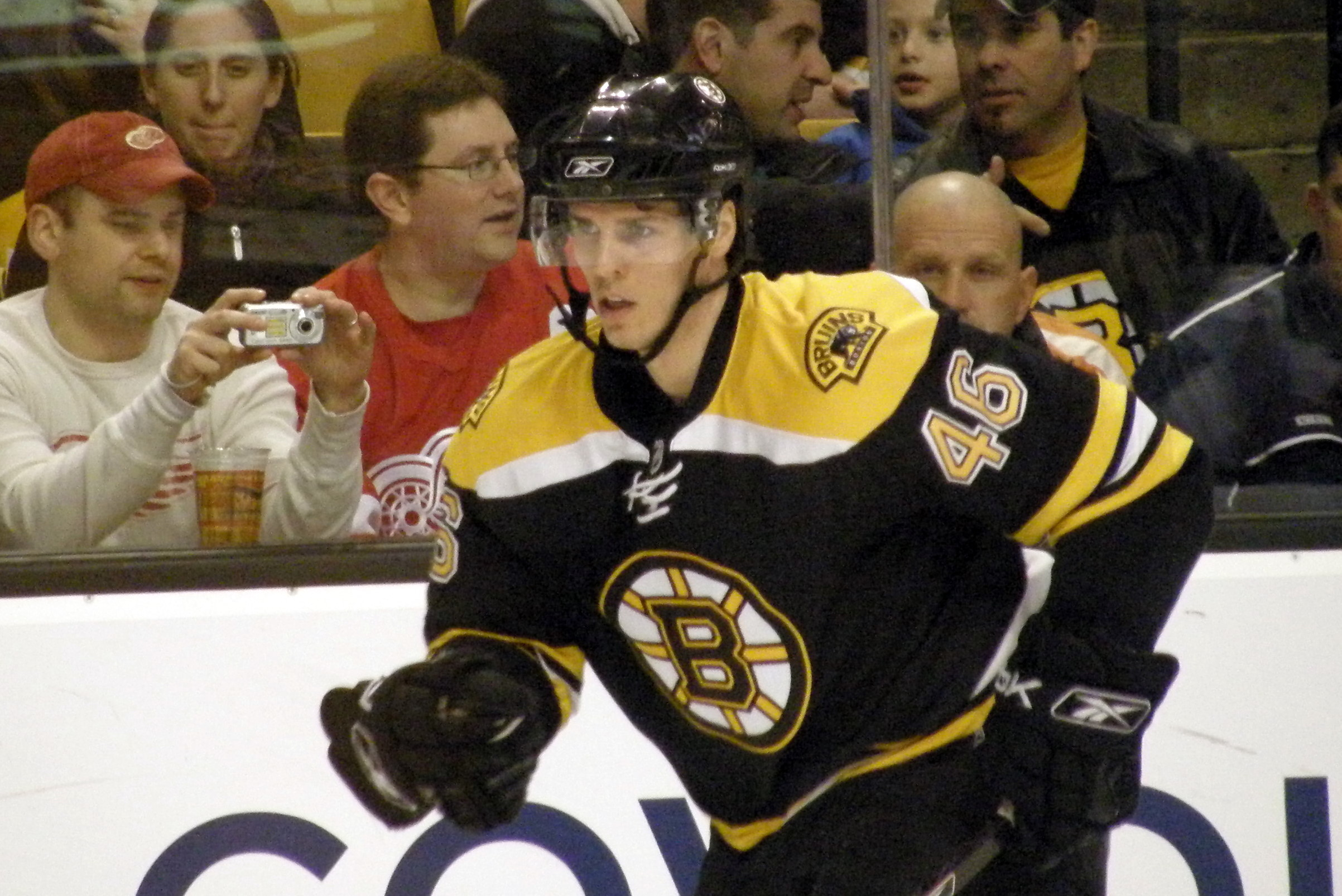
Krejčí with the Bruins in February 2008

During the 2008–09 season, Krejčí scored his first NHL hat-trick on 18 December 2008 against the Toronto Maple Leafs. He registered his first two goals against starter Vesa Toskala and his third against Curtis Joseph in an 8–5 Bruins win. About the midpoint of that season, NESN's play-by-play TV announcer Jack Edwards for televised Bruins games gave Krejčí the nickname "The Matrix" due to his ability to slow down the pace of a game through his skating style and abilities on the ice. Before a game on 2 April 2009, Krejčí was named the winner of the Boston Bruins' 2009 Seventh Player Award. The award is given annually to the player who "goes beyond the call of duty and exceeds all expectations" throughout the course of the season. During the game, Krejčí assisted on a goal by Milan Lucic, the 2008 winner of the Seventh Player Award, in a 2–1 home ice victory over the Ottawa Senators. He completed his second NHL season with a then-career-high 73 points in 82 games to go with a league-high +37 plus-minus rating. On 2 June 2009, he signed a multi-year contract extension with the Bruins, reportedly a three-year contract paying an average of $3.75 million per year.

At the beginning of November 2009, Krejčí was noticeably ill; on 5 November 2009, it was confirmed that Krejčí had been diagnosed with the H1N1 virus, which sidelined him for some time.

On 5 May 2010, during the 2010 Stanley Cup playoffs, Krejčí dislocated his wrist less than five minutes into a game when he was checked at the Bruins' blue line by Philadelphia Flyers' centre Mike Richards. Surgery was needed and was performed following the game at Union Memorial Hospital in Baltimore, and Krejčí missed the remainder of the playoffs.

On 25 May 2011, in game six of the Eastern Conference Finals against the Tampa Bay Lightning, Krejčí recorded his second NHL career hat-trick. He was the first Bruin to record a playoff hat-trick since Cam Neely, two decades prior. On 15 June, Krejčí and the Bruins won the team's first Stanley Cup in 39 years after defeating the Vancouver Canucks 4–0 in game seven of the Final. Krejčí finished the 2011 playoffs with a playoff-leading 12 goals, 23 points and 4 game-winning goals.

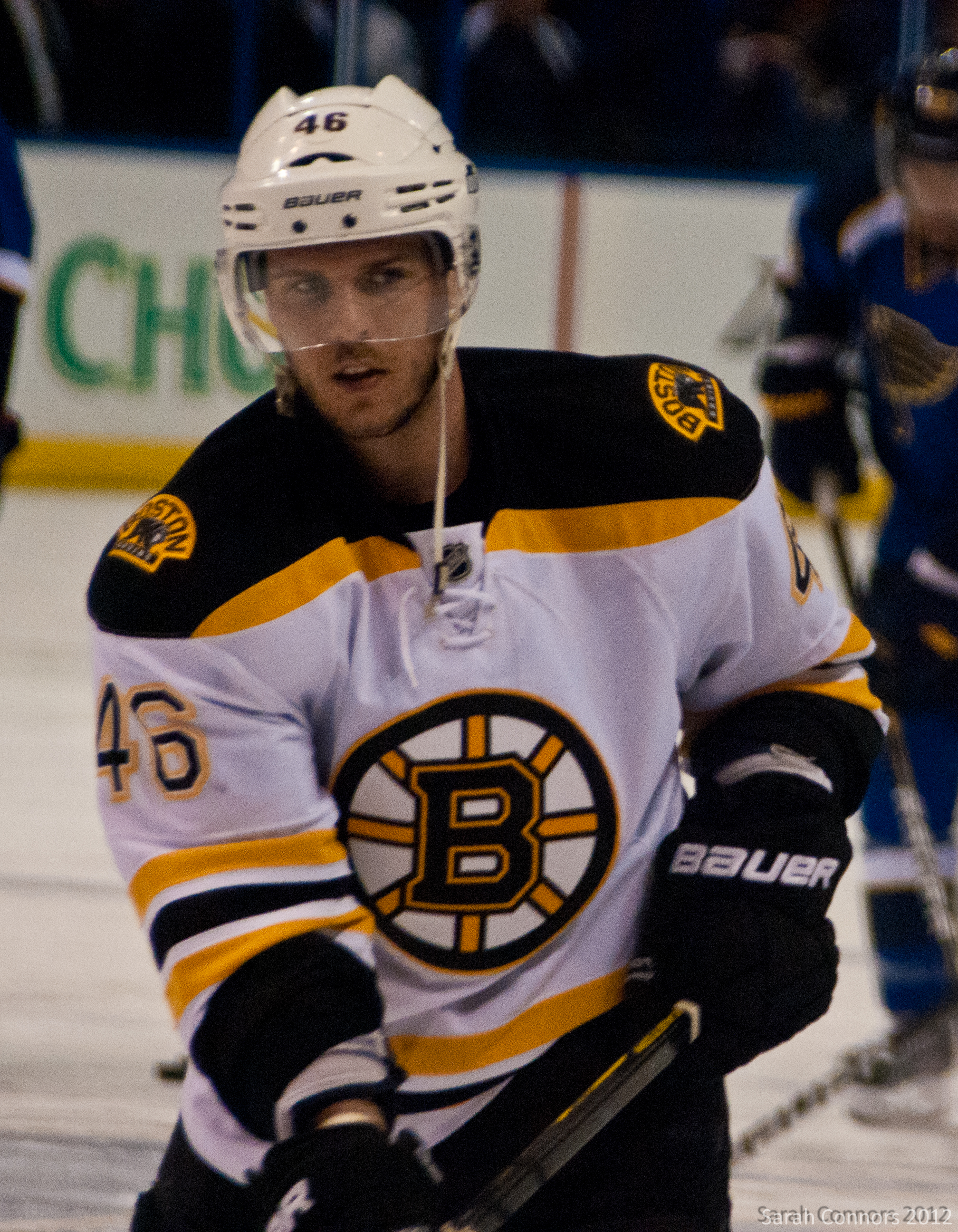
Krejčí with the Bruins in February 2012

On 1 March 2012, in a game against the New Jersey Devils, Krejčí scored his third career hat-trick, scoring in the first, third and overtime periods in a 4–3 win. In game four of the 2013 opening round playoffs against the Toronto Maple Leafs, Krejčí scored a hat-trick, including the game-winning goal in overtime. Krejčí would also lead the league again in points in the playoffs with 26, but his team fell short to the Chicago Blackhawks 4–2 in the Final.

On 1 October 2013, Krejčí was named an alternate captain of the Bruins. On 25 October 2013, he scored a game-winning goal with 0.8 seconds left against the San Jose Sharks and goaltender Antti Niemi.

On 3 September 2014, Krejčí signed a six-year contract extension with the Bruins. During a road game on 20 February 2015 against the St. Louis Blues, Krejčí suffered a partial tear of his MCL in his left knee, forcing him off the ice for 4–6 weeks for recovery.

During the Bruins' home game against the Toronto Maple Leafs on 8 December 2018, Krejčí became the tenth-highest scoring Bruins player of all-time (surpassing Cam Neely) when he recorded a goal and an assist in a 6–3 Bruins' win, bringing his points total to 592. Three days later, on 11 December, Krejčí played his 800th NHL game, recording three assists in a Bruins' 4–3 home win over the Arizona Coyotes. Just one week later, on 20 December, Krejčí recorded his 600th career NHL point after scoring the Bruins' third goal in a 4–1 home ice defeat of the Anaheim Ducks.

As of the end of the 2020–21 season, Krejčí's 42 playoff goals ranked him seventh on the Bruins' all-time list of postseason scorers. At that time, he was also ranked 16th in Boston history in regular-season goals scored (215), seventh in assists (515) and eighth in total points (730).

On 30 July 2021, Krejčí announced that he was leaving the NHL and intended to return to the Czech Republic to continue his career. The Bruins' general manager, Don Sweeney, indicated that the team would "keep the door open" for a return in the future if Krejčí decided to return.

==== HC Olomouc (2021–2022) ====
In his return to his roots, Krejčí returned to his first club as a junior, agreeing to a one-year contract with Czech club HC Olomouc of the Czech Extraliga (ELH) on 2 August 2021. In the 2021–22 season, as an alternate captain with Olomouc, Krejčí led the team in scoring, notching 20 goals and 46 points through 51 regular season games. He added 5 points through 5 post-season games in a qualifying round defeat to HC Vítkovice Ridera.

==== Return to Boston and retirement (2022–2023) ====
After concluding his one-year contract with Olomouc, Krejčí opted to return for a 16th season with the Bruins, agreeing to a bonus laden one-year, $1 million contract on 8 August 2022. He played his 1,000th NHL game on 16 January 2023 at TD Garden against the Philadelphia Flyers, dishing out three assists in a 6–0 victory.

On 14 August 2023, Krejčí retired from the NHL after 18 seasons. However, he later clarified he had not retired from hockey overall, due to interest in playing for the Czech national team at the Czech-hosted 2024 IIHF World Championship, as well as a potential short-term return to a European professional league.

On 1 December 2023, Krejčí retired from hockey entirely due to persistent health problems.

== International play ==
Medal record

Representing Czech Republic

Ice hockey

World Championships
Bronze medal – third place	2012 Finland/Sweden	
Bronze medal – third place	2022 Finland	

World Junior Championships
Bronze medal – third place	2005 United States	

IIHF World U18 Championship
Bronze medal – third place	2004 Belarus	

After the Bruins' 2007–08 season ended, Krejčí was named to the Czech national team on 26 April 2008, for the 2008 IIHF World Championships. He was named to the Czech national team for the 2010 Winter Olympics, playing centre on a line with wingers Tomáš Fleischmann and Martin Erat to open the Games.

Following the Bruins' defeat to the Tampa Bay Lightning in the second round of the 2018 playoffs, Krejčí was invited to participate at the 2018 IIHF World Championship.

Krejci was named an assistant captain for the Czech national team for the 2022 Winter Olympics. Unfortunately, the Olympics would bring the worst result ever for the Czechs, as they finished 9th. However, Krejci and the Czechs would get redemption at the international level later that year, capturing his second bronze at the 2022 IIHF World Championships, once again serving as an assistant captain.

== Personal life ==
Krejčí married his wife, Naomi Starr, in 2014. They have two children together: Elina and Everett.

== Career statistics ==
=== Regular season and playoffs ===
Bold indicates led league

			Regular season					Playoffs
Season	Team	League	GP	G	A	Pts	PIM	GP	G	A	Pts	PIM
2002–03	HC Vagnerplast Kladno	CZE U18	22	12	24	36	42	—	—	—	—	—
2002–03	HC Vagnerplast Kladno	CZE U20	12	4	5	9	2	12	5	5	10	8
2003–04	HC Rabat Kladno	CZE U20	50	23	37	60	37	7	3	6	9	4
2004–05	Gatineau Olympiques	QMJHL	62	22	41	63	31	10	2	7	9	10
2005–06	Gatineau Olympiques	QMJHL	55	27	54	81	54	17	10	22	32	24
2006–07	Providence Bruins	AHL	69	31	43	74	47	13	3	13	16	22
2006–07	Boston Bruins	NHL	6	0	0	0	2	—	—	—	—	—
2007–08	Providence Bruins	AHL	25	7	21	28	19	—	—	—	—	—
2007–08	Boston Bruins	NHL	56	6	21	27	20	7	1	4	5	2
2008–09	Boston Bruins	NHL	82	22	51	73	26	11	2	6	8	2
2009–10	Boston Bruins	NHL	79	17	35	52	26	9	4	4	8	2
2010–11	Boston Bruins	NHL	75	13	49	62	28	25	**12**	11	**23**	10
2011–12	Boston Bruins	NHL	79	23	39	62	36	7	1	2	3	4
2012–13	HC ČSOB Pojišťovna Pardubice	ELH	24	16	11	27	22	—	—	—	—	—
2012–13	Boston Bruins	NHL	47	10	23	33	20	22	9	**17**	**26**	8
2013–14	Boston Bruins	NHL	80	19	50	69	28	12	0	4	4	4
2014–15	Boston Bruins	NHL	47	7	24	31	22	—	—	—	—	—
2015–16	Boston Bruins	NHL	72	17	46	63	32	—	—	—	—	—
2016–17	Boston Bruins	NHL	82	23	31	54	26	3	0	0	0	0
2017–18	Boston Bruins	NHL	64	17	27	44	18	12	3	7	10	6
2018–19	Boston Bruins	NHL	81	20	53	73	16	24	4	12	16	8
2019–20	Boston Bruins	NHL	61	13	30	43	23	13	4	8	12	6
2020–21	Boston Bruins	NHL	51	8	36	44	16	11	2	7	9	2
2021–22	HC Olomouc	ELH	51	20	26	46	24	5	3	2	5	4
2022–23	Boston Bruins	NHL	70	16	40	56	20	4	1	3	4	0
NHL totals			1,032	231	555	786	359	160	43	85	128	60
ELH totals			75	36	37	73	46	5	3	2	5	4

=== International ===
Year	Team	Event	GP	G	A	Pts	PIM
2003	Czech Republic	U18	5	—	—	—	—
2004	Czech Republic	WJC18	7	3	4	7	0
2005	Czech Republic	WJC	7	0	1	1	2
2006	Czech Republic	WJC	6	3	3	6	4
2008	Czech Republic	WC	5	0	0	0	2
2010	Czech Republic	OG	5	2	1	3	6
2012	Czech Republic	WC	10	3	4	7	4
2014	Czech Republic	OG	5	1	2	3	0
2018	Czech Republic	WC	5	1	5	6	0
2022	Czech Republic	OG	4	1	3	4	0
2022	Czech Republic	WC	10	3	9	12	4
Junior totals			20	6	8	14	6
Senior totals			44	11	24	35	16

== Awards and honours ==
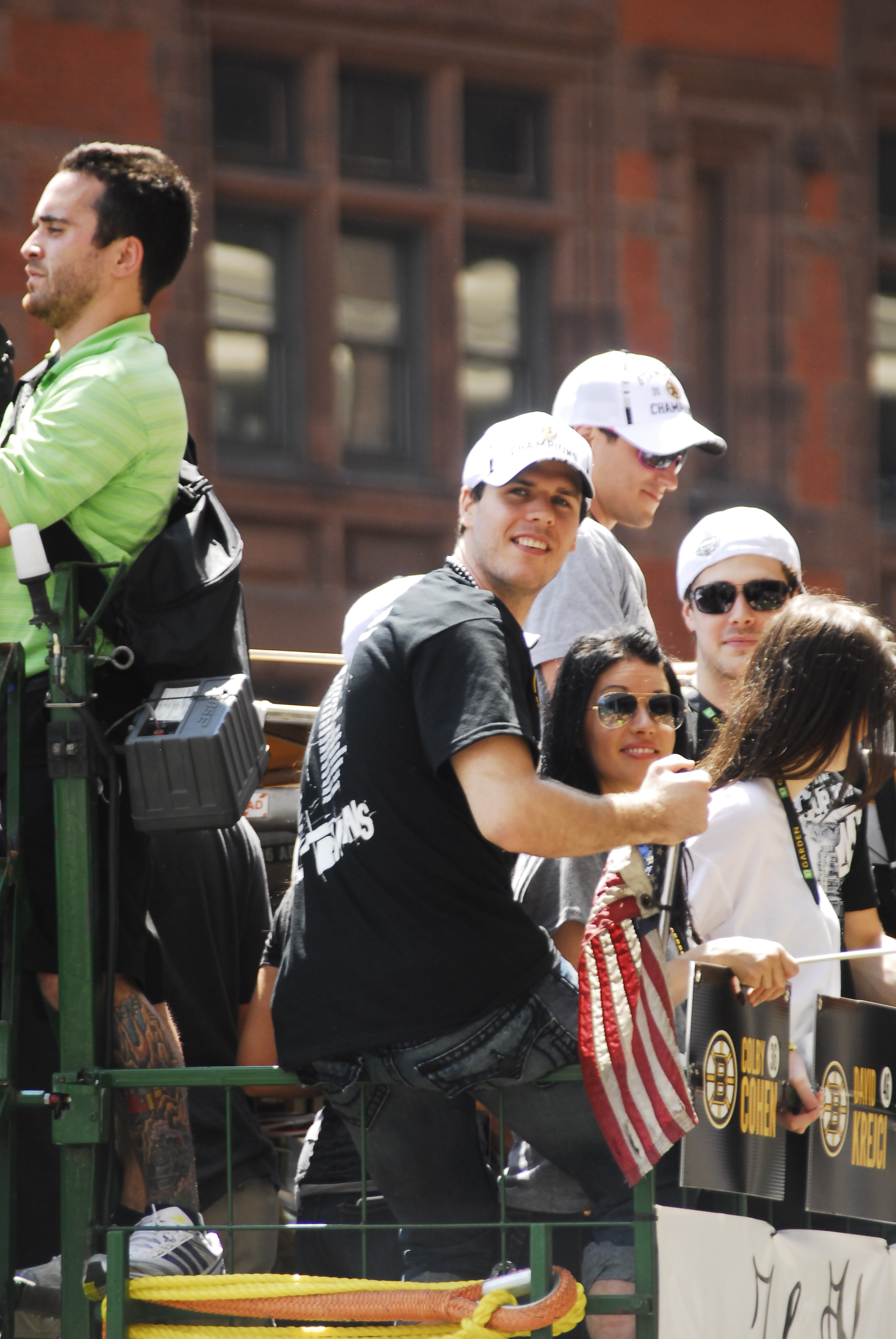
Krejčí during the Bruins 2011 Stanley Cup parade

Award	Year
Czech Republic
Golden Hockey Stick	2013
NHL
Stanley Cup champion	2011
International
IIHF World Championship Top 3 Player on Team	2022
Boston Bruins
Seventh Player Award	2009
Bruins Three Stars Awards	2010, 2014, 2016
Elizabeth C. Dufresne Trophy	2014
Named One of Top 100 Best Bruins Players of all Time	2024
Boston Bruins All-Centennial Team	2024
