= Roman Voloshenko =

Belarusian-born Russian ice hockey player

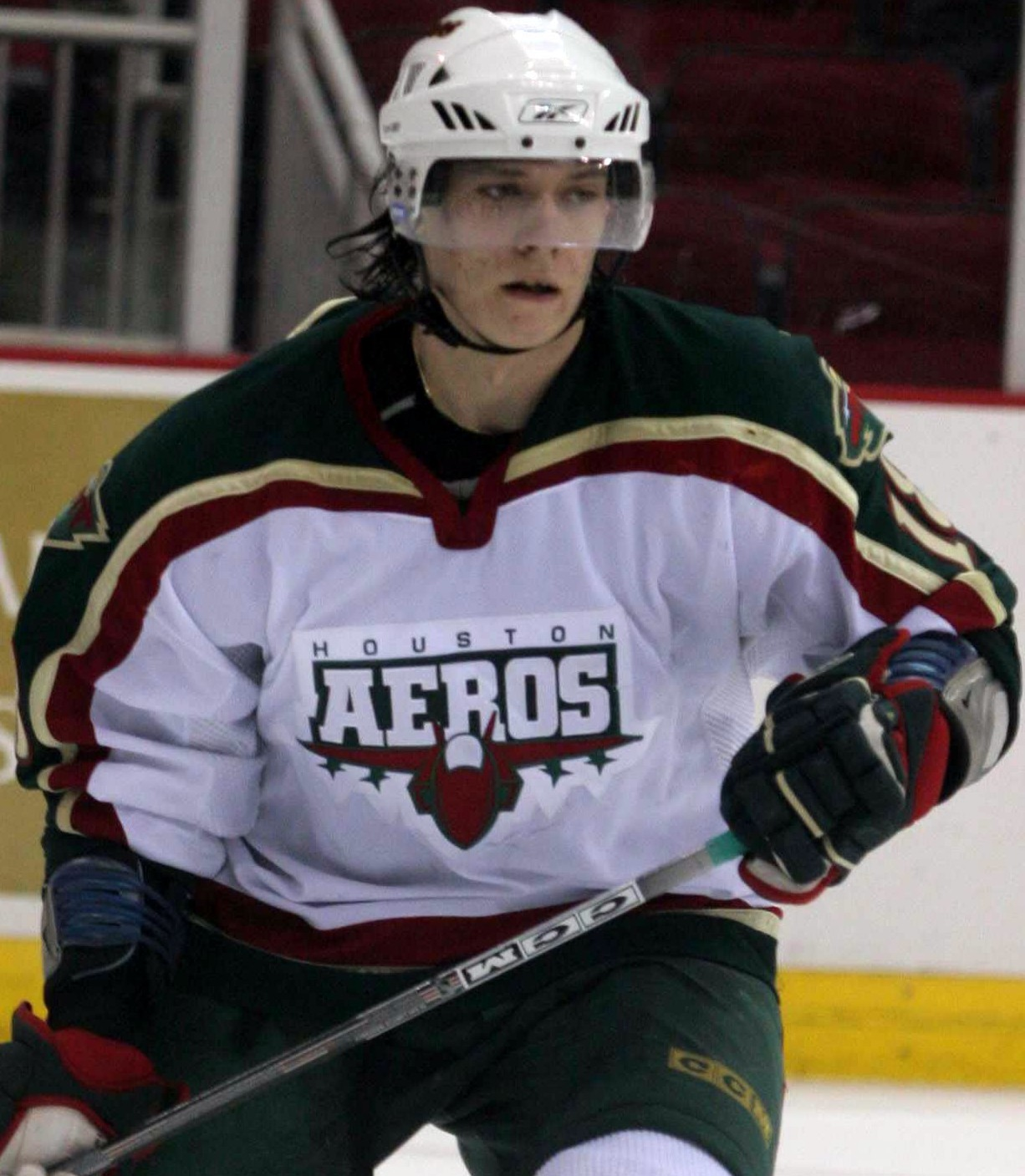
- Voloshenko with the Houston Aeros in 2005
- Born: May 12, 1986 (age 40) Brest, Byelorussian SSR, USSR
- Height: 6 ft 1 in (185 cm)
- Weight: 189 lb (86 kg; 13 st 7 lb)
- Position: Left wing
- Shot: Right
- Played for: Krylya Sovetov Moscow; Houston Aeros; HC Dynamo Moscow; HC MVD
- NHL draft: 42nd overall, 2004; Minnesota Wild
- Playing career: 2002–2017

Roman Voloshenko (born May 12, 1986) is a Belarusian-born Russian retired professional ice hockey left winger.

Though born in Brest, Belarus, Voloshenko represented Russia at under-18 and under-20 level. He began his professional career with Krylya Sovetov Moscow in 2001. He was drafted by the Minnesota Wild in the 2004 NHL entry draft with the 42nd overall pick in the second round. He then moved to the United States in 2005 and skated for the Wild's AHL farm club the Houston Aeros for two seasons before returning to Russia in 2007.

== Career statistics ==
=== Regular season and playoffs ===
| | | | Regular season | | | | | Playoffs |
| Season | Team | League | GP | G | A | Pts | PIM | GP | G | A | Pts | PIM |
|---|---|---|---|---|---|---|---|---|---|---|---|---|
| 2001–02 | Krylia Sovetov–2 Moscow | RUS.3 | 8 | 2 | 3 | 5 | 0 | — | — | — | — | — |
| 2002–03 | Krylia Sovetov Moscow | RSL | 5 | 0 | 1 | 1 | 2 | — | — | — | — | — |
| 2002–03 | Krylia Sovetov–2 Moscow | RUS.3 | 19 | 9 | 10 | 19 | 18 | — | — | — | — | — |
| 2003–04 | Krylia Sovetov Moscow | RUS.2 | 46 | 7 | 8 | 15 | 40 | 4 | 1 | 1 | 2 | 4 |
| 2003–04 | Krylia Sovetov–2 Moscow | RUS.3 | 4 | 3 | 1 | 4 | 2 | — | — | — | — | — |
| 2004–05 | Krylia Sovetov Moscow | RUS.2 | 38 | 16 | 13 | 29 | 22 | 3 | 0 | 1 | 1 | 2 |
| 2004–05 | Krylia Sovetov–2 Moscow | RUS.3 | 2 | 2 | 0 | 2 | 2 | — | — | — | — | — |
| 2005–06 | Houston Aeros | AHL | 69 | 33 | 27 | 60 | 36 | 7 | 0 | 1 | 1 | 0 |
| 2006–07 | Houston Aeros | AHL | 76 | 11 | 19 | 30 | 22 | — | — | — | — | — |
| 2007–08 | Ak Bars–2 Kazan | RUS.3 | 7 | 9 | 6 | 15 | 4 | — | — | — | — | — |
| 2007–08 | Dynamo Moscow | RSL | 18 | 1 | 1 | 2 | 6 | 3 | 0 | 0 | 0 | 2 |
| 2007–08 | Dynamo–2 Moscow | RUS.3 | 4 | 3 | 6 | 9 | 0 | — | — | — | — | — |
| 2008–09 | Dynamo Moscow | KHL | 5 | 0 | 0 | 0 | 2 | — | — | — | — | — |
| 2008–09 | Dynamo–2 Moscow | RUS.3 | 2 | 2 | 1 | 3 | 2 | — | — | — | — | — |
| 2008–09 | HC MVD | KHL | 10 | 1 | 1 | 2 | 2 | — | — | — | — | — |
| 2008–09 | HC–2 MVD | RUS.3 | 17 | 13 | 19 | 32 | 4 | 4 | 0 | 2 | 2 | 0 |
| 2009–10 | Molot–Prikamye Perm | RUS.2 | 42 | 19 | 13 | 32 | 34 | 6 | 1 | 1 | 2 | 0 |
| 2010–11 | Molot–Prikamye Perm | VHL | 53 | 14 | 18 | 32 | 38 | 4 | 1 | 1 | 2 | 0 |
| 2011–12 | Rubin Tyumen | VHL | 52 | 11 | 22 | 33 | 18 | 18 | 3 | 7 | 10 | 30 |
| 2012–13 | HC Kuban | VHL | 29 | 6 | 6 | 12 | 14 | — | — | — | — | — |
| 2012–13 | Rubin Tyumen | VHL | 22 | 6 | 6 | 12 | 8 | 12 | 5 | 2 | 7 | 8 |
| 2013–14 | Rubin Tyumen | VHL | 37 | 6 | 8 | 14 | 8 | 5 | 0 | 1 | 1 | 0 |
| 2014–15 | THK Tver | VHL | 47 | 12 | 13 | 25 | 12 | 16 | 4 | 3 | 7 | 4 |
| 2015–16 | THK Tver | VHL | 44 | 14 | 12 | 26 | 8 | 11 | 1 | 1 | 2 | 6 |
| 2016–17 | PSK Sakhalin | ALH | 38 | 5 | 11 | 16 | 12 | 2 | 0 | 0 | 0 | 2 |
| RSL & KHL totals | | | 38 | 2 | 3 | 5 | 12 | — | — | — | — | — |
| RUS.2 & VHL totals | | | 310 | 111 | 119 | 230 | 202 | 79 | 16 | 18 | 34 | 54 |

=== International ===
| Year | Team | Event | Result | GP | G | A | Pts | PIM |
|---|---|---|---|---|---|---|---|---|
| 2003 | Russia | U18 | 2nd place, silver medalist(s) | 5 | 1 | 2 | 3 | 0 |
| 2004 | Russia | WJC18 | 1st place, gold medalist(s) | 6 | 5 | 6 | 11 | 18 |
| 2005 | Russia | WJC | 2nd place, silver medalist(s) | 6 | 2 | 0 | 2 | 2 |
| 2006 | Russia | WJC | 2nd place, silver medalist(s) | 6 | 3 | 0 | 3 | 2 |
| Junior totals | | | | 23 | 11 | 8 | 19 | 22 |
