= Jakub Šindel =

Czech ice hockey player

- Born: 24 January 1986 (age 40) Jihlava, TCH
- Height: 6 ft 0 in (183 cm)
- Weight: 181 lb (82 kg; 12 st 13 lb)
- Position: Center
- Shot: Right
- Played for: Morzine-Avoriaz-Les Gets; Coventry Blaze; SV Kaltern; HC Fassa; Porin Ässät; Oulun Kärpät; Dinamo Riga; Kloten Flyers; Lahti Pelicans; HC Plzeň; Sparta Praha; Kometa Brno; BK Mladá Boleslav
- National team: Czech Republic
- NHL draft: 54th overall, 2004; Chicago Blackhawks
- Playing career: 2003–2016

Jakub Šindel is a Czech former ice hockey center. During his career, which lasted from 2003 to 2016, he played for several teams in different European leagues. He was also selected by the Chicago Blackhawks of the National Hockey League in the 2nd round (54th overall) of the 2004 NHL entry draft. After his playing career he became a referee.

His father Jaromír Šindel was also an international in the sport.

== Career statistics ==
=== Regular season and playoffs ===
			Regular season					Playoffs
Season	Team	League	GP	G	A	Pts	PIM	GP	G	A	Pts	PIM
1999–2000	HC Slavia Praha	CZE U18	32	10	6	16	6	—	—	—	—	—
2000–01	HC Slavia Praha	CZE U18	26	14	12	26	2	6	1	0	1	0
2001–02	HC Slavia Praha	CZE U18	32	32	14	46	32	2	0	1	1	2
2001–02	HC Sparta Praha	CZE U20	14	7	4	11	10	—	—	—	—	—
2002–03	HC Slavia Praha	CZE U20	41	14	14	28	41	—	—	—	—	—
2002–03	HC Sparta Praha	CZE U20	6	0	1	1	4	2	0	1	1	0
2003–04	HC Sparta Praha	CZE U20	13	8	14	22	4	—	—	—	—	—
2003–04	HC Sparta Praha	ELH	34	5	1	6	14	13	1	1	2	2
2003–04	HC Dukla Jihlava	CZE.2	1	0	0	0	0	—	—	—	—	—
2004–05	HC Sparta Praha	CZE U20	9	5	16	21	16	—	—	—	—	—
2004–05	HC Sparta Praha	ELH	10	0	2	2	0	—	—	—	—	—
2004–05	SK Horácká Slavia Třebíč	CZE.2	5	0	0	0	0	—	—	—	—	—
2004–05	Brandon Wheat Kings	WHL	35	16	13	29	12	24	7	4	11	22
2005–06	HC Sparta Praha	ELH	12	1	1	2	6	—	—	—	—	—
2005–06	HC Lasselsberger Plzeň	ELH	31	11	8	19	18	—	—	—	—	—
2006–07	HC Lasselsberger Plzeň	ELH	50	16	10	26	30	—	—	—	—	—
2006–07	BK Mladá Boleslav	CZE.2	4	1	0	1	4	8	5	5	10	20
2007–08	HC Lasselsberger Plzeň	ELH	45	19	4	23	16	4	0	2	2	4
2007–08	BK Mladá Boleslav	CZE.2	—	—	—	—	—	11	5	2	7	8
2008–09	HC Lasselsberger Plzeň	ELH	22	4	4	8	12	—	—	—	—	—
2008–09	Pelicans	SM-liiga	23	7	8	15	14	8	2	2	4	8
2009–10	HC Kometa Brno	ELH	44	11	9	20	34	—	—	—	—	—
2010–11	Pelicans	SM-liiga	59	15	18	33	16	—	—	—	—	—
2011–12	Kloten Flyers	NLA	5	0	2	2	0	—	—	—	—	—
2011–12	Dinamo Rīga	KHL	21	1	0	1	16	—	—	—	—	—
2011–12	Kärpät	SM-liiga	11	0	3	3	2	—	—	—	—	—
2011–12	Ässät	SM-liiga	9	0	0	0	4	—	—	—	—	—
2012–13	HC Fassa Falcons	ITA	42	23	33	56	24	—	—	—	—	—
2013–14	HC Fassa Falcons	ITA	40	16	27	43	18	3	2	0	2	4
2014–15	SV Kaltern	ITA	14	3	5	8	4	—	—	—	—	—
2014–15	Coventry Blaze	EIHL	35	9	7	16	45	3	0	0	0	0
2015–16	Pingouins de Morzine–Avoriaz	FRA	16	5	3	8	16	—	—	—	—	—
ELH totals			248	67	39	106	130	17	1	3	4	6
SM-liiga totals			102	22	29	51	36	12	5	3	8	8

=== International ===
Year	Team	Event	GP	G	A	Pts	PIM
2002	Czech Republic	U18	5	0
2003	Czech Republic	WJC18	6	4	1	5	4
2003	Czech Republic	U18	5
2004	Czech Republic	WJC	5	0	1	1	0
2004	Czech Republic	WJC18	7	3	3	6	6
2006	Czech Republic	WJC	7	0	1	1	0
Junior totals			25	7	6	13	10
