= Ladislav Šmíd =

Czech ice hockey player (born 1986)

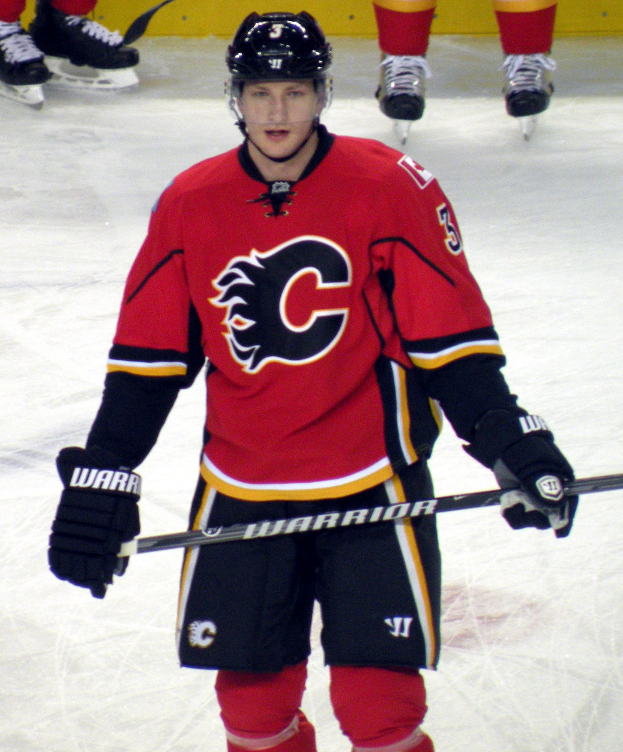
- Šmíd with the Calgary Flames in 2013
- Born: February 1, 1986 (age 40) Frýdlant, Czechoslovakia
- Height: 6 ft 3 in (191 cm)
- Weight: 209 lb (95 kg; 14 st 13 lb)
- Position: Defence
- Shot: Left
- Played for: Bílí Tygři Liberec; Edmonton Oilers; Calgary Flames
- National team: Czech Republic
- NHL draft: 9th overall, 2004; Mighty Ducks of Anaheim
- Playing career: 2002–2022

Ladislav Šmíd (Czech pronunciation: [ˈlaɟɪslaf ˈʃmiːt], born February 1, 1986) is a Czech former professional ice hockey defenceman. He played in the National Hockey League (NHL) with the Edmonton Oilers and Calgary Flames.

== Playing career ==
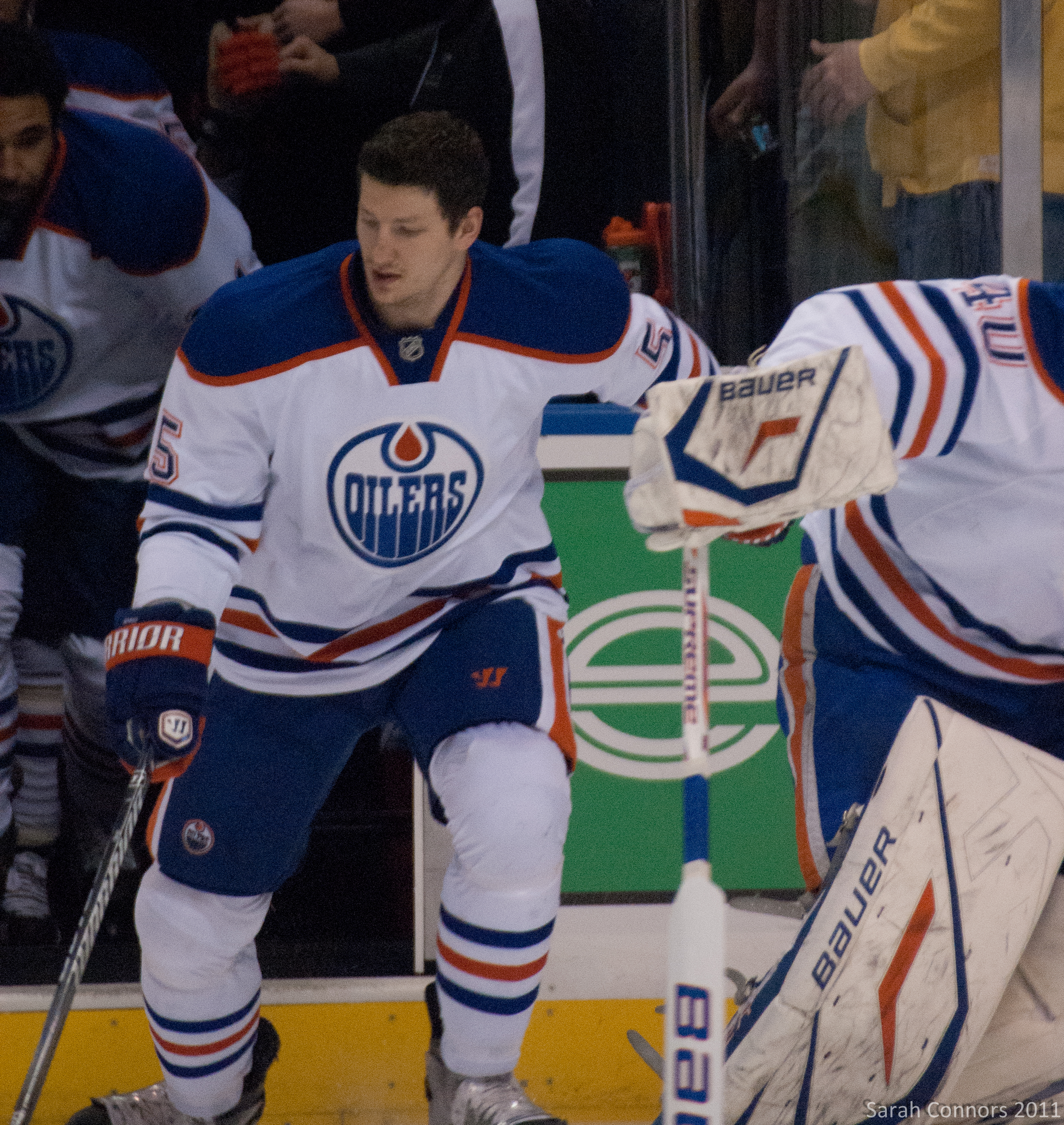
Šmíd as a member of the Oilers

As a youth, Šmíd played in the 2000 Quebec International Pee-Wee Hockey Tournament with a team from Chomutov.

Šmíd was drafted in the first round of the 2004 NHL entry draft, ninth overall, by the Mighty Ducks of Anaheim. He played junior hockey for HC Liberec Junior in the 2001–02 season, and split the following three seasons between HC Liberec Junior and the professional HC Bílí Tygři Liberec. He also played for the Czech Republic in the 2004, 2005 and 2006 IIHF World U20 Championships, as well as for the under-18 team in the 2004 IIHF World U18 Championships.

After coming to North America, Šmíd spent the 2005–06 season with the Portland Pirates, at the time the American Hockey League (AHL) affiliate of the Mighty Ducks. On July 3, 2006, he was traded to the Edmonton Oilers with Joffrey Lupul and several draft picks in exchange for disgruntled defenceman Chris Pronger. Šmíd made the Oilers' roster out of his first training camp with the team, and spent the entire 2006–07 season with Edmonton. After the Oilers missed the Stanley Cup playoffs, he joined the Czech senior team at the 2007 Men's World Ice Hockey Championships. The following year, he was cut from the Oilers' training camp and assigned to the Springfield Falcons of the AHL, with whom he played eight games before being recalled to Edmonton.

After the 2008–09 season, Šmíd was part of a trade negotiated between the Oilers and the Ottawa Senators that would have seen him, as well as teammates Andrew Cogliano and Dustin Penner, dealt to Ottawa in exchange for forward Dany Heatley. Heatley, however, refused to waive the no-trade clause in his contract to go to Edmonton, and after more than a month of the Oilers unsuccessfully trying to persuade Heatley to change his mind, the trade fell through and Šmíd remained with the Oilers. In October 2009, the Oilers revealed that Šmíd had been diagnosed with H1N1, though he did not miss any games as a result.

In Šmíd's sixth season in the NHL, he turned into a reliable shutdown defenceman, often paired with Jeff Petry on defence and playing against other teams' top lines each night. Šmíd finished the season with a positive plus-minus rating, and was in the top ten in blocked shots for the majority of the season. Šmíd suffered a neck injury in a game against the Los Angeles Kings; despite avoiding serious neck injury, he did not play in any of the Oilers' remaining games in the season. He ranked top five in the NHL for blocked shots for the 2011–12 season, also receiving attention for accidentally hitting Oilers Head Coach Tom Renney with a puck after deflecting it into the air during a drill during practice.

On April 1, 2013, Šmíd signed a four-year, $14 million contract extension with the Oilers. At the time of his signing, he was in the final year of a two-year deal worth $2.25 million per season.

On November 8, 2013, Šmíd was traded by the Oilers to rivals, the Calgary Flames, along with Olivier Roy, in exchange for Roman Horák and Laurent Brossoit.

With his tenure with the Flames marked by a lingering back injury, Šmíd in his last year under contract sat out the entirety of the 2016–17 season, in order to rehabilitate his injury. As an impending free agent, on May 23, 2017, Šmíd signed a two-year contract in returning to his original club in the Czech Republic, HC Bílí Tygři Liberec of the ELH.

On March 29, 2022, Šmíd announced his retirement from professional hockey following HC Bílí Tygři Liberec's elimination in the 2022 playoffs. The loss came after the second longest game in the history of Czech ice hockey against HC Sparta Praha. Šmíd played more than 40 minutes in his final game.

== Career statistics ==
=== Regular season and playoffs ===
			Regular season					Playoffs
Season	Team	League	GP	G	A	Pts	PIM	GP	G	A	Pts	PIM
2002–03	Bílí Tygři Liberec	CZE U20	41	1	18	19	30	8	2	1	3	31
2002–03	Bílí Tygři Liberec	ELH	4	0	0	0	0	—	—	—	—	—
2003–04	Bílí Tygři Liberec	CZE U20	14	4	10	14	38	2	1	0	1	6
2003–04	Bílí Tygři Liberec	ELH	45	1	1	2	51	—	—	—	—	—
2003–04	HC Berounští Medvědi	CZE.2	—	—	—	—	—	3	1	1	2	4
2004–05	Bílí Tygři Liberec	CZE U20	3	0	1	1	4	—	—	—	—	—
2004–05	Bílí Tygři Liberec	ELH	39	1	3	4	14	12	0	0	0	6
2005–06	Portland Pirates	AHL	71	3	25	28	48	16	0	1	1	16
2006–07	Edmonton Oilers	NHL	77	3	7	10	37	—	—	—	—	—
2007–08	Springfield Falcons	AHL	8	1	4	5	15	—	—	—	—	—
2007–08	Edmonton Oilers	NHL	65	0	4	4	58	—	—	—	—	—
2008–09	Edmonton Oilers	NHL	60	0	11	11	57	—	—	—	—	—
2009–10	Edmonton Oilers	NHL	51	1	8	9	39	—	—	—	—	—
2010–11	Edmonton Oilers	NHL	78	0	10	10	85	—	—	—	—	—
2011–12	Edmonton Oilers	NHL	78	5	10	15	44	—	—	—	—	—
2012–13	Bílí Tygři Liberec	ELH	22	2	12	14	22	—	—	—	—	—
2012–13	Edmonton Oilers	NHL	48	1	3	4	55	—	—	—	—	—
2013–14	Edmonton Oilers	NHL	17	1	1	2	16	—	—	—	—	—
2013–14	Calgary Flames	NHL	56	1	5	6	62	—	—	—	—	—
2014–15	Calgary Flames	NHL	31	0	1	1	13	—	—	—	—	—
2015–16	Calgary Flames	NHL	22	0	0	0	6	—	—	—	—	—
2015–16	Stockton Heat	AHL	1	0	0	0	0	—	—	—	—	—
2017–18	Bílí Tygři Liberec	ELH	47	3	10	13	40	10	1	1	2	12
2017–18	HC Benátky nad Jizerou	CZE.2	1	0	0	0	12	—	—	—	—	—
2018–19	Bílí Tygři Liberec	ELH	51	4	20	24	54	17	1	5	6	8
2019–20	Bílí Tygři Liberec	ELH	51	6	29	35	64	—	—	—	—	—
2020–21	Bílí Tygři Liberec	ELH	26	1	10	11	40	—	—	—	—	—
2021–22	Bílí Tygři Liberec	ELH	32	2	16	18	24	10	1	8	9	4
ELH totals			317	20	101	121	309	49	3	14	17	30
NHL totals			583	12	60	72	472	—	—	—	—	—

=== International ===
Year	Team	Event	Result	GP	G	A	Pts	PIM
2003	Czech Republic	WJC18	6th	6	0	0	0	2
2004	Czech Republic	WJC	4th	6	1	2	3	4
2004	Czech Republic	WJC18	3rd place, bronze medalist(s)	5	0	2	2	0
2005	Czech Republic	WJC	3rd place, bronze medalist(s)	7	0	2	2	4
2006	Czech Republic	WJC	6th	6	1	1	2	0
2007	Czech Republic	WC	7th	6	0	0	0	31
2013	Czech Republic	WC	7th	8	0	3	3	6
2014	Czech Republic	OG	6th	5	0	0	0	2
Junior totals				30	2	7	9	10
Senior totals				19	0	3	3	39

Awards and achievements
Preceded by Corey Perry	Mighty Ducks of Anaheim first-round draft pick 2004	Succeeded by Bobby Ryan
