= Alexander Yunkov =

Russian ice hockey player

- Born: 21 November 1982 (age 43) Voskresensk, Russian SFSR
- Height: 5 ft 11 in (180 cm)
- Weight: 196 lb (89 kg; 14 st 0 lb)
- Position: Forward
- Shot: Left
- Played for: Dynamo Moscow; HK Liepājas Metalurgs; Vityaz Chekhov; Khimik Voskresensk; Spartak Moscow; Severstal Cherepovets; Amur Khabarovsk; Traktor Chelyabinsk; Atlant Moscow Oblast
- Playing career: 1998–2015

Alexander Yunkov (Russian: Александр Юньков; born November 21, 1982) is a Russian former professional ice hockey forward who played in the Russian Superleague (RSL) and the Kontinental Hockey League (KHL).

He is the brother of Mikhail Yunkov, also a professional ice hockey player, for Severstal Cherepovets of the KHL.

== Honours ==
- Pajulahti Cup: 2006 (With Severstal)
