= Richard Demén-Willaume =

Swedish ice hockey player (born 1986)

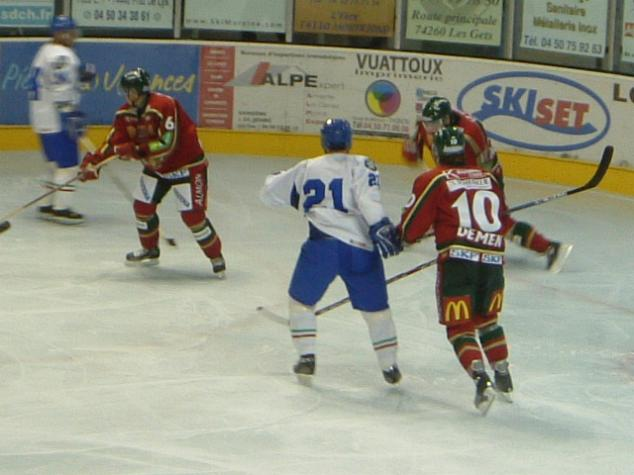
- Born: 28 January 1986 (age 40) Åsa, Sweden
- Height: 6 ft 3 in (191 cm)
- Weight: 222 lb (101 kg; 15 st 12 lb)
- Position: Defence
- Shot: Left
- Played for: Frölunda HC; Rögle BK; Dragons de Rouen; SaiPa; Timrå IK
- NHL draft: 154th overall, 2004; Colorado Avalanche
- Playing career: 2005–2013

Richard Demén-Willaume (born 28 January 1986) is a Swedish former professional ice hockey player. He is a defenceman who last played for Timrå IK in the Swedish Hockey League (SHL).

== Playing career ==
Demén-Willaume began his junior hockey career with Frölunda HC in the J18 Allsvenskan in 2001. By the 2003–04 season Demén-Willaume played regularly in the J20 SuperElit and was selected to the Swedish World U18 Championship team in 2004. Richard was then selected by the Colorado Avalanche 154th overall in the 2004 NHL entry draft.

In the 2004–05 season, Demén-Willaume posted the best plus/minus (+39) in the J20 SuperElit. He also made his professional debut with Frölunda HC in the Elitserien, playing in 9 regular season games and one playoff game. After securing a regular roster spot with Frölunda in the 2005–06 season, Richard then left for North America attending the Colorado Avalanche training camp for the 2006–07 season.

Demén-Willaume was hit by injury and was assigned to semi-pro league affiliate, the Arizona Sundogs of the CHL. Appearing in only 9 games with the Sundogs, Richard then returned to Sweden. In the 2007–08 season, Demén-Willaume played in the HockeyAllsvenskan after he signed with Rögle BK. Richard helped promote the team to the Elitserien for the first time in 12 years for the 2008–09 season.

In the 2009–10 season, his third with Rögle, Richard played in only 12 games before he was released and signed for the rest of the year by Hockey Allsvenskan side, the Malmö Redhawks on January 28, 2010. After playing 13 games with the Redhawks to end the season, Richards option of an additional year did not come to fruition and he signed a one-year contract with fellow Allsvenskan side Borås HC on July 9, 2010.

Demén-Willaume played 43 games with Boras in the following season, which included an early loan to return to Frölunda before he was returned to the Allsvenskan after only 6 games. Unable to deliver on his potential within the Swedish leagues, Demén-Willaume then signed a one-year contract at season's end with Dragons de Rouen of the French Ligue Magnus on May 9, 2011.

A free agent to begin the 2012–13 season, Demén-Willaume joined Finnish club SaiPa on a try-out contract on September 17, 2012. After 14 games in the SM-liiga, he was released from his try-out and returned to Sweden, signing with HockeyAllsvenskan club, Tingsryds AIF, on November 12, 2012.

Demén-Willaume stay with Tingsryds was cut short after only two games as he was signed on an initial try-out with Elitserien club, Timrå IK, before earning a contract for the remainder of the season on December 12, 2012.

== Career statistics ==
=== Regular season and playoffs ===
			Regular season					Playoffs
Season	Team	League	GP	G	A	Pts	PIM	GP	G	A	Pts	PIM
2001–02	Västra Frölunda HC	J18 Allsv	13	2	2	4	14	—	—	—	—	—
2001–02	Västra Frölunda HC	J20	1	0	0	0	0	—	—	—	—	—
2002–03	Västra Frölunda HC	J18 Allsv	1	0	0	0	2	5	0	3	3	4
2002–03	Västra Frölunda HC	J20	22	0	6	6	14	4	0	0	0	0
2003–04	Västra Frölunda HC	J18 Allsv	—	—	—	—	—	7	1	2	3	4
2003–04	Västra Frölunda HC	J20	35	6	7	13	22	5	0	1	1	6
2004–05	Frölunda HC	J20	32	3	12	15	63	6	1	1	2	22
2004–05	Frölunda HC	SEL	8	0	0	0	0	1	0	0	0	0
2005–06	Frölunda HC	J20	10	4	8	12	8	6	3	5	8	31
2005–06	Frölunda HC	SEL	42	2	1	3	26	—	—	—	—	—
2006–07	Arizona Sundogs	CHL	9	0	2	2	16	—	—	—	—	—
2007–08	Rögle BK	Allsv	43	6	10	16	44	9	4	0	4	6
2008–09	Rögle BK	SEL	24	5	7	12	32	—	—	—	—	—
2009–10	Rögle BK	SEL	12	0	1	1	10	—	—	—	—	—
2009–10	Malmö Redhawks	Allsv	13	1	1	2	29	5	0	0	0	0
2010–11	Borås HC	Allsv	43	2	10	12	36	—	—	—	—	—
2010–11	Frölunda HC	SEL	6	0	1	1	8	—	—	—	—	—
2011–12	Dragons de Rouen	FRA	25	3	10	13	34	15	0	2	2	10
2012–13	SaiPa	SM-liiga	14	1	1	2	12	—	—	—	—	—
2012–13	Tingsryds AIF	Allsv	2	0	0	0	0	—	—	—	—	—
2012–13	Timrå IK	SEL	27	2	2	4	12	—	—	—	—	—
SEL totals			119	9	12	21	88	1	0	0	0	0
Allsv totals			101	9	21	30	109	14	4	0	4	6

=== International ===
Year	Team	Event	Result	GP	G	A	Pts	PIM
2004	Sweden	WJC18	5th	6	1	1	2	10
Junior totals				6	1	1	2	10
