= Adam Berti =

Canadian ice hockey player

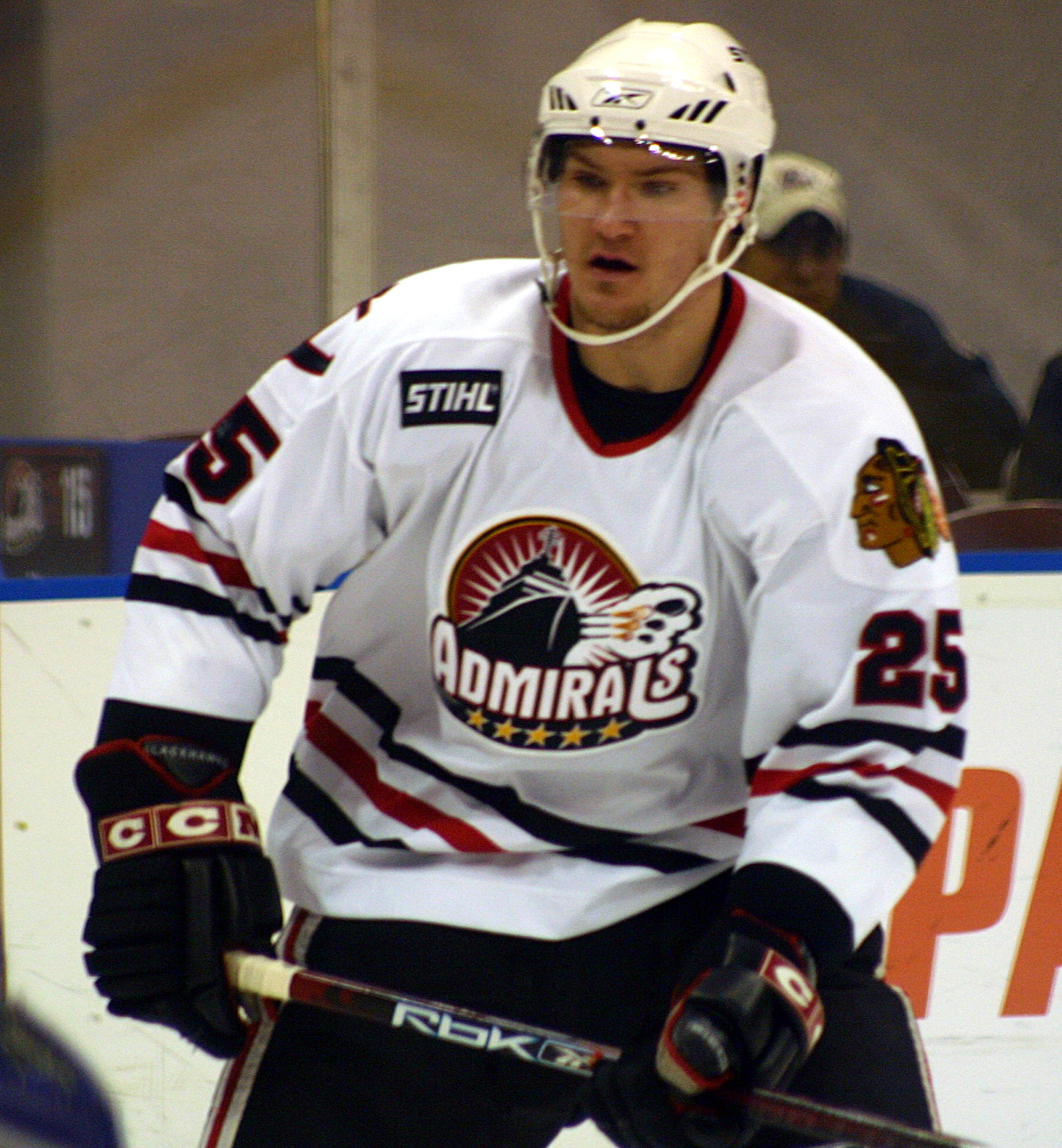
- Berti with the Norfolk Admirals in 2006
- Born: July 1, 1986 (age 39) Scarborough, Ontario, Canada
- Height: 6 ft 3 in (191 cm)
- Weight: 207 lb (94 kg; 14 st 11 lb)
- Position: Left Wing
- Shot: Left
- Played for: Chicago Blackhawks
- NHL draft: 68th overall, 2004; Chicago Blackhawks
- Playing career: 2006–2010

Adam Berti (born July 1, 1986) is a Canadian professional ice hockey left winger. He was drafted by the Chicago Blackhawks in the third round, 68th overall, of the 2004 NHL entry draft from the Oshawa Generals of the Ontario Hockey League. He made his National Hockey League debut with Chicago near the end of the 2007–08 season and played 2 games with them. The rest of his career, which lasted from 2006 to 2010, was spent in the minor leagues.

== Career statistics ==
=== Regular season and playoffs ===
			Regular season					Playoffs
Season	Team	League	GP	G	A	Pts	PIM	GP	G	A	Pts	PIM
2002–03	Oshawa Generals	OHL	15	3	3	6	12	—	—	—	—	—
2003–04	Oshawa Generals	OHL	66	17	29	46	44	7	0	2	2	4
2004–05	Oshawa Generals	OHL	66	23	28	51	53	—	—	—	—	—
2005–06	Oshawa Generals	OHL	23	16	18	34	28	—	—	—	—	—
2005–06	Erie Otters	OHL	39	17	12	29	24	—	—	—	—	—
2006–07	Norfolk Admirals	AHL	48	6	6	12	50	—	—	—	—	—
2007–08	Chicago Blackhawks	NHL	2	0	0	0	0	—	—	—	—	—
2007–08	Rockford IceHogs	AHL	42	2	5	7	68	5	1	0	1	2
2007–08	Pensacola Ice Pilots	ECHL	4	2	3	5	0	—	—	—	—	—
2008–09	Rockford IceHogs	AHL	10	1	2	3	5	1	0	0	0	0
2008–09	Fresno Falcons	ECHL	29	3	6	9	28	—	—	—	—	—
2008–09	Gwinnett Gladiators	ECHL	39	10	24	34	16	5	0	3	3	9
2009–10	Gwinnett Gladiators	ECHL	66	16	41	57	24	—	—	—	—	—
AHL totals			100	9	13	22	123	6	1	0	1	2
ECHL totals			138	31	74	105	68	5	0	3	3	9
NHL totals			2	0	0	0	0	—	—	—	—	—

=== International ===
Year	Team	Event	GP	G	A	Pts	PIM
2004	Canada	WJC18	7	1	2	3	26
Junior totals			7	1	2	3	26
