= Kirill Lyamin =

Russian ice hockey player

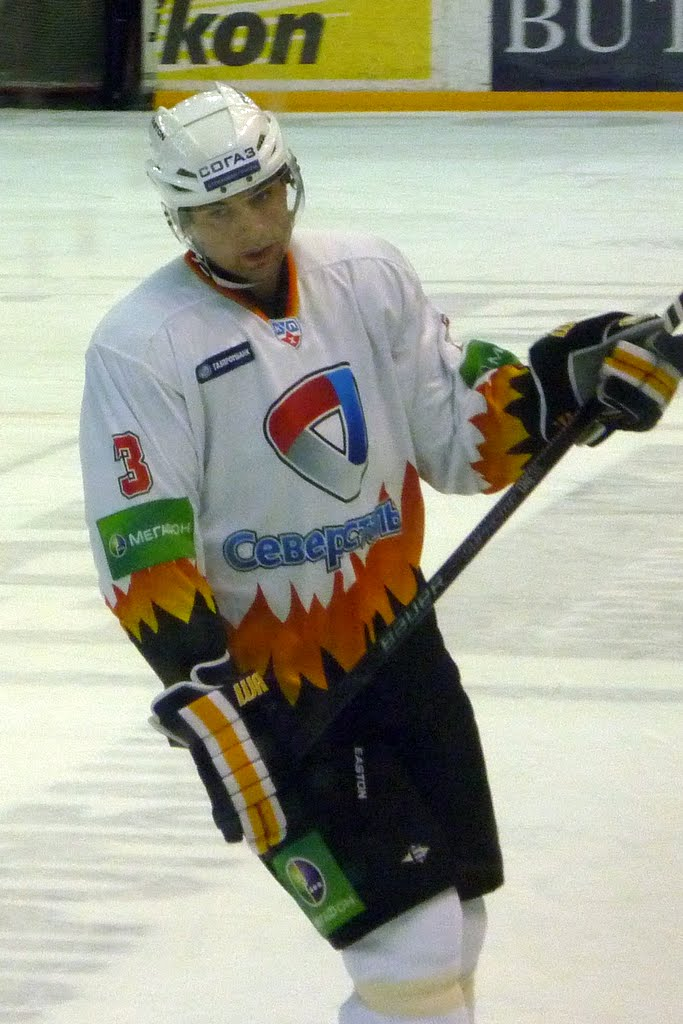
- Born: January 13, 1986 (age 40) Moscow, Russian SFSR
- Height: 6 ft 2 in (188 cm)
- Weight: 205 lb (93 kg; 14 st 9 lb)
- Position: Defence
- Shoots: Left
- VHL team Former teams: HC Yugra; CSKA Moscow; Atlant Moscow Oblast; Spartak Moscow; Severstal Cherepovets; Avangard Omsk; Neftekhimik Nizhnekamsk; Avtomobilist Yekaterinburg; Dynamo Moscow; HC Vityaz
- NHL draft: 58th overall, 2004; Ottawa Senators
- Playing career: 2003–present

Kirill Lyamin (born January 13, 1986) is a Russian professional ice hockey player. He is currently under contract with HC Yugra of the Supreme Hockey League (VHL).

== Playing career ==
Lyamin is a product of the CSKA Moscow ice hockey system. The young defenceman started playing for the Super League (Russia 1) club during the 2003–04 season at just the age of 16. He was a longtime member of the U18 and the U20 national teams and was drafted by the Ottawa Senators in the 2004 NHL entry draft with the 58th overall pick in the second round. After the draft, Lyamin spent another two seasons with CSKA before signing a new deal with HC Khimik, where he played through the 2007–08 season. In 2008, he signed with Spartak Moscow.

On 24 May 2011, Lyamin signed a two-year deal with Avangard Omsk.

After two seasons with HC Neftekhimik Nizhnekamsk, Lyamin left as a free agent to sign a two-year contract starting from the 2017–18 season with Avtomobilist Yekaterinburg, on May 8, 2017.

In his lone season under contract in 2019–20 with Dynamo Moscow, Lyamin added 2 goals and 8 points in 54 games from the blueline. With the playoffs cancelled after completion of the first round due to the COVID-19 pandemic, Lyamin left the club as a free agent.

After a well travelled 2020-21 season, split between Spartak Moscow and a return to Dynamo Moscow, as well as a season ending stint in the Polish Hockey League, Lyamin returned to the KHL in agreeing to a contract with HC Vityaz on 4 July 2021.

== Career statistics ==
=== Regular season and playoffs ===
| | | | Regular season | | | | | Playoffs |
| Season | Team | League | GP | G | A | Pts | PIM | GP | G | A | Pts | PIM |
|---|---|---|---|---|---|---|---|---|---|---|---|---|
| 2002–03 | CSKA–2 Moscow | RUS.3 | 28 | 3 | 4 | 7 | 28 | — | — | — | — | — |
| 2003–04 | CSKA Moscow | RSL | 28 | 0 | 3 | 3 | 12 | — | — | — | — | — |
| 2003–04 | CSKA–2 Moscow | RUS.3 | 13 | 1 | 2 | 3 | 26 | — | — | — | — | — |
| 2004–05 | CSKA–2 Moscow | RUS.3 | 45 | 2 | 13 | 15 | 112 | — | — | — | — | — |
| 2005–06 | CSKA Moscow | RSL | 25 | 0 | 1 | 1 | 28 | 2 | 0 | 0 | 0 | 0 |
| 2005–06 | CSKA–2 Moscow | RUS.3 | 2 | 1 | 1 | 2 | 4 | — | — | — | — | — |
| 2006–07 | CSKA Moscow | RSL | 47 | 1 | 7 | 8 | 48 | 12 | 1 | 0 | 1 | 8 |
| 2006–07 | CSKA–2 Moscow | RUS.3 | 1 | 0 | 0 | 0 | 0 | — | — | — | — | — |
| 2007–08 | Khimik Moscow Oblast | RSL | 40 | 1 | 6 | 7 | 77 | 3 | 0 | 0 | 0 | 0 |
| 2007–08 | Khimik–2 Moscow Oblast | RUS.3 | 13 | 5 | 5 | 10 | 44 | — | — | — | — | — |
| 2008–09 | Spartak Moscow | KHL | 54 | 1 | 7 | 8 | 82 | 6 | 0 | 0 | 0 | 4 |
| 2009–10 | Spartak Moscow | KHL | 48 | 3 | 9 | 12 | 52 | 1 | 0 | 0 | 0 | 0 |
| 2010–11 | Severstal Cherepovets | KHL | 49 | 3 | 9 | 12 | 66 | 6 | 1 | 2 | 3 | 8 |
| 2011–12 | Avangard Omsk | KHL | 49 | 1 | 4 | 5 | 53 | 19 | 0 | 5 | 5 | 12 |
| 2012–13 | Avangard Omsk | KHL | 37 | 3 | 1 | 4 | 32 | 12 | 1 | 0 | 1 | 6 |
| 2013–14 | Avangard Omsk | KHL | 52 | 3 | 11 | 14 | 22 | — | — | — | — | — |
| 2014–15 | Avangard Omsk | KHL | 57 | 2 | 8 | 10 | 28 | 12 | 0 | 2 | 2 | 2 |
| 2015–16 | Neftekhimik Nizhnekamsk | KHL | 56 | 5 | 8 | 13 | 30 | 2 | 0 | 1 | 1 | 2 |
| 2016–17 | Neftekhimik Nizhnekamsk | KHL | 44 | 2 | 12 | 14 | 22 | — | — | — | — | — |
| 2017–18 | Avtomobilist Yekaterinburg | KHL | 48 | 1 | 10 | 11 | 20 | 5 | 0 | 0 | 0 | 0 |
| 2018–19 | Avtomobilist Yekaterinburg | KHL | 43 | 2 | 5 | 7 | 26 | 3 | 0 | 0 | 0 | 0 |
| 2019–20 | Dynamo Moscow | KHL | 54 | 2 | 6 | 8 | 28 | 6 | 1 | 0 | 1 | 4 |
| 2020–21 | Spartak Moscow | KHL | 2 | 0 | 0 | 0 | 2 | — | — | — | — | — |
| 2020–21 | Dynamo Moscow | KHL | 4 | 0 | 0 | 0 | 0 | — | — | — | — | — |
| 2020–21 | GKS Katowice | POL | 8 | 1 | 0 | 1 | 0 | 11 | 1 | 2 | 3 | 4 |
| 2021–22 | HC Vityaz | KHL | 44 | 0 | 8 | 8 | 30 | — | — | — | — | — |
| RSL totals | | | 140 | 2 | 17 | 19 | 165 | 17 | 1 | 0 | 1 | 8 |
| KHL totals | | | 641 | 28 | 98 | 126 | 493 | 80 | 3 | 11 | 14 | 34 |

Medal record

Representing Russia

Ice hockey

World Junior Championships
| Silver medal – second place | 2006 Canada | |

=== International ===
| Year | Team | Event | Result | GP | G | A | Pts | PIM |
|---|---|---|---|---|---|---|---|---|
| 2004 | Russia | WJC18 | 1st place, gold medalist(s) | 6 | 1 | 0 | 1 | 20 |
| 2006 | Russia | WJC | 2nd place, silver medalist(s) | 6 | 0 | 0 | 0 | 6 |
| Junior totals | | | | 12 | 1 | 0 | 1 | 26 |
