= Marek Schwarz =

Czech ice hockey player (born 1986)

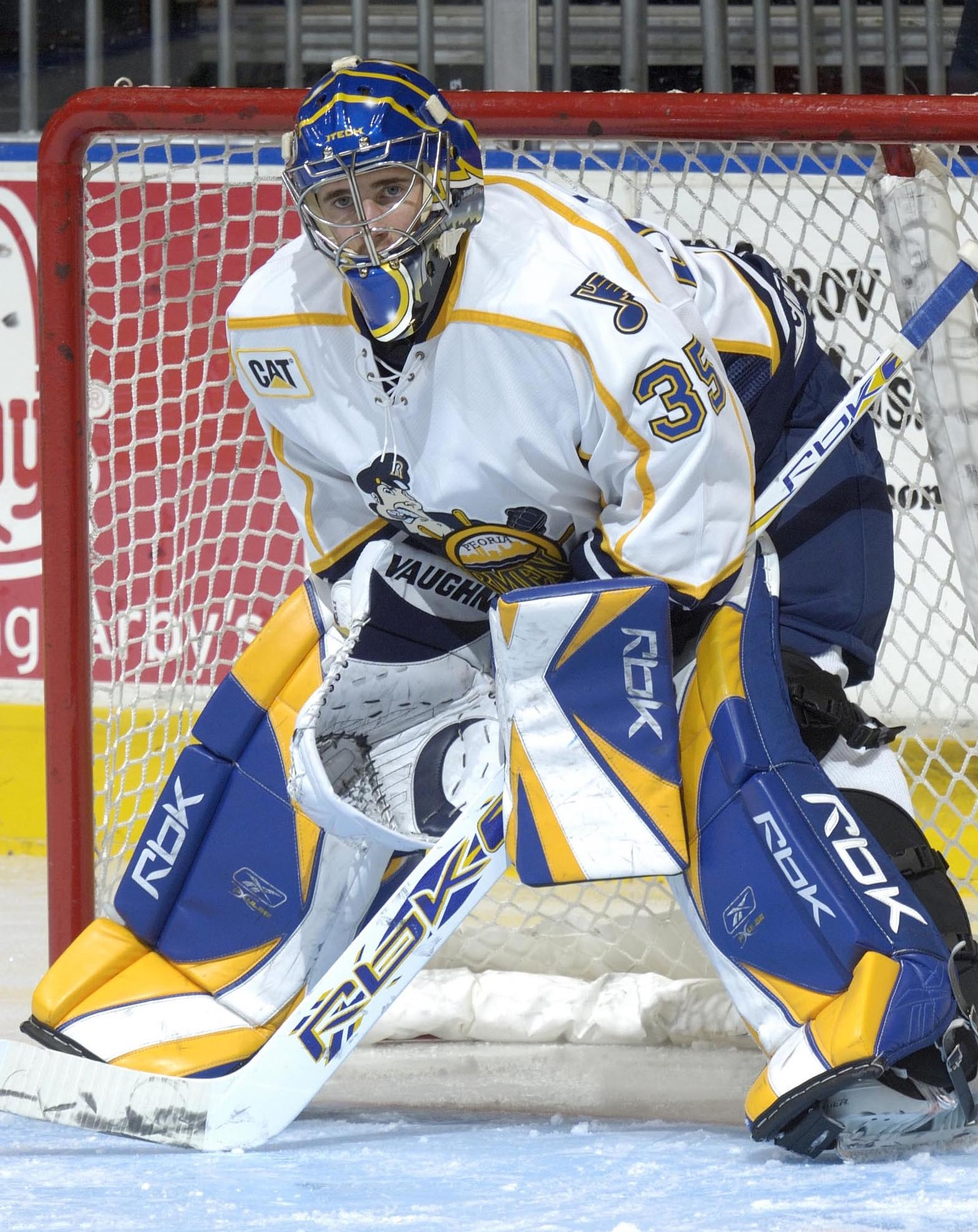
- Schwarz with the Peoria Rivermen in 2006
- Born: 1 April 1986 (age 40) Mladá Boleslav, Czechoslovakia
- Height: 6 ft 0 in (183 cm)
- Weight: 180 lb (82 kg; 12 st 12 lb)
- Position: Goaltender
- Caught: Right
- Played for: HC Sparta Praha; HC Plzeň; HC Oceláři Třinec; St. Louis Blues; BK Mladá Boleslav; TPS; HC Bílí Tygři Liberec; Orli Znojmo
- NHL draft: 17th overall, 2004; St. Louis Blues
- Playing career: 2003–2023

Marek Schwarz (born 1 April 1986) is a Czech former professional ice hockey goaltender. He played 6 games in the National Hockey League with the St. Louis Blues from 2006 to 2008. The rest of his career, which lasted from 2003 to 2023, was mainly spent in the Czech Extraliga. Internationally Schwarz played for the Czech national junior team at several junior tournaments, winning bronze medals at both the 2004 under-18 championships and 2005 World Junior Championships.

== Playing career ==
As a youth, Schwarz played in the 2000 Quebec International Pee-Wee Hockey Tournament with a team from Chomutov. He played junior ice hockey in his native Czech Republic with HC Sparta Praha. He made his debut at the senior level with Sparta Praha playing one game in the Czech Extraliga in 2002–03. The following season, he joined the Extraliga full-time at seventeen-years-old and played between three teams – HC Plzeň, HC Oceláři Třinec and Sparta Praha. That off-season, Schwarz was drafted 17th overall by the St. Louis Blues in the 2004 NHL entry draft.

Upon being drafted, he moved to North America to play major junior in the Western Hockey League (WHL) with the Vancouver Giants. He posted a 2.67 GAA and a winning record before moving back to the Czech Republic the following season to continue to play for Sparta Praha.

In 2006–07, he began playing for the Peoria Rivermen, the Blues' American Hockey League (AHL) affiliate. He was called up that season and played in his first NHL game on 12 December 2006 against the Chicago Blackhawks. Schwarz made 21 saves on 24 shots as the Blues lost 3–2. At 20 years old, he became the third youngest goaltender in Blues history to play in a game.

On 25 October 2008 Schwarz combined with third-string goalie Ben Bishop for a 4–0 shutout against the Florida Panthers. With Manny Legacé and Chris Mason out due to injuries, Schwarz was called up to play backup to Bishop when Bishop also went down with an injury in the third period. Schwarz completed the shutout with 15 minutes to go.

== Career statistics ==
=== Regular season and playoffs ===
			Regular season										Playoffs
Season	Team	League	GP	W	L	T	OTL	MIN	GA	SO	GAA	SV%	GP	W	L	MIN	GA	SO	GAA	SV%
1999–00	TJ Mlada Boleslav U18	CZE U18-2	25	—	—	—	—	—	—	—	2.43	—	—	—	—	—	—	—	—	—
2000–01	TJ Mlada Boleslav U18	CZE U18	45	5	37	0	—	1969	154	0	4.69	.887	—	—	—	—	—	—	—	—
2001–02	Sparta Praha U18	CZE U18	45	33	7	0	—	2692	86	9	1.92	.929	—	—	—	—	—	—	—	—
2001–02	Sparta Praha U20	CZE U20	1	—	—	—	—	—	—	0	12.86	.824	6	3	2	368	16	0	2.61	.899
2002–03	Sparta Praha	CZE	1	0	1	0	—	1	0	0	0.00	1.000	—	—	—	—	—	—	—	—
2002–03	Sparta Praha U18	CZE U18	17	11	1	0	—	—	—	2	1.44	.935	1	0	1	—	—	0	1.00	.967
2002–03	Sparta Praha U20	CZE U20	16	—	—	—	—	—	—	—	2.43	.924	1	0	1	—	—	0	4.00	882
2003–04	Sparta Praha	CZE	8	1	6	0	—	335	20	0	3.58	.896	—	—	—	—	—	—	—	—
2003–04	HC Plzeň	CZE	10	4	5	0	—	603	33	0	3.28	.922	—	—	—	—	—	—	—	—
2003–04	HC Oceláři Třinec	CZE	5	3	2	0	—	280	12	0	2.57	.931	—	—	—	—	—	—	—	—
2003–04	HC Mladá Boleslav	CZE-2	1	0	1	0	—	63	6	0	5.71	.867	—	—	—	—	—	—	—	—
2003–04	Sparta Praha U20	CZE U20	7	—	—	—	—	352	—	—	2.39	.930	—	—	—	—	—	—	—	—
2004–05	Vancouver Giants	WHL	56	26	24	4	—	3304	147	2	2.67	.900	6	2	4	378	18	0	2.86	.903
2005–06	Sparta Praha	CZE	15	7	8	—	0	746	32	1	2.57	.920	1	—	—	—	—	0	0.00	1.000
2005–06	HC Berounští Medvědi	CZE	4	0	4	—	0	17	32	0	4.45	.878	—	—	—	—	—	—	—	—
2005–06	Sparta Praha U20	CZE U20	3	—	—	—	—	178	5	—	1.69	.946	—	—	—	—	—	—	—	—
2006–07	St. Louis Blues	NHL	2	0	1	—	0	60	3	0	3.00	.880	—	—	—	—	—	—	—	—
2006–07	Peoria Rivermen	AHL	34	19	13	—	0	1912	88	1	2.76	.899	—	—	—	—	—	—	—	—
2007–08	St. Louis Blues	NHL	2	0	1	—	0	50	6	0	7.25	.647	—	—	—	—	—	—	—	—
2007–08	Peoria Rivermen	AHL	33	14	14	—	2	1808	84	0	2.79	.891	—	—	—	—	—	—	—	—
2007–08	Alaska Aces	ECHL	6	6	0	—	0	375	13	0	2.08	.924	8	5	2	—	—	—	3.21	.911
2008–09	St. Louis Blues	NHL	2	0	0	—	0	16	0	0	0.00	1.000	—	—	—	—	—	—	—	—
2008–09	Peoria Rivermen	AHL	10	4	4	—	0	523	31	2	3.56	.868	—	—	—	—	—	—	—	—
2008–09	Alaska Aces	ECHL	5	2	2	—	1	304	16	0	3.15	.904	—	—	—	—	—	—	—	—
2008–09	HC Mladá Boleslav	CZE	8	2	6	—	0	—	—	1	3.67	.907	—	—	—	—	—	—	—	—
2009–10	HC Mladá Boleslav	CZE	43	17	26	—	0	2302	109	2	2.84	.917	—	—	—	—	—	—	—	—
2010–11	HC Mladá Boleslav	CZE	44	—	—	—	—	—	—	2	2.84	.914	—	—	—	—	—	—	—	—
2011–12	TPS	FIN	35	9	19	—	5	1895	90	—	2.84	.894	1	0	1	29	2	0	4.08	.857
2012–13	Sparta Praha	CZE	16	8	8	—	0	745	49	0	3.95	.886	—	—	—	—	—	—	—	—
2012–13	Bílí Tygři Liberec	CZE	15	7	8	—	0	835	46	0	3.31	.898	—	—	—	—	—	—	—	—
2013–14	Bílí Tygři Liberec	CZE	19	7	12	—	0	974	60	0	3.70	.898	—	—	—	—	—	—	—	—
2013–14	HC Benátky nad Jizerou	CZE-2	14	9	5	—	0	—	—	5	1.68	.949	5	2	3	—	—	0	3.37	.912
2014–15	Bílí Tygři Liberec	CZE	6	2	4	—	0	312	17	0	3.27	.873	—	—	—	—	—	—	—	—
2014–15	HC Benátky nad Jizerou	CZE-2	14	7	7	—	0	—	—	2	2.52	.920	—	—	—	—	—	—	—	—
2015–16	Bílí Tygři Liberec	CZE	18	13	5	—	0	975	32	3	1.97	.919	3	2	1	—	—	0	1.80	.925
2015–16	HC Benátky nad Jizerou	CZE-2	13	6	7	—	0	—	—	1	2.75	.918	—	—	—	—	—	—	—	—
2016–17	Orli Znojmo	EBEL	31	15	16	—	0	1695	84	0	2.97	.906	4	0	4	—	—	0	2.79	.910
2017–18	Orli Znojmo	EBEL	47	17	25	—	0	2623	132	0	3.02	.893	—	—	—	—	—	—	—	—
2018–19	Bílí Tygři Liberec	CZE	6	3	3	—	0	197	9	0	2.74	.904	—	—	—	—	—	—	—	—
2018–19	HC Benátky nad Jizerou	CZE-2	23	7	16	—	0	—	—	1	2.85	.911	—	—	—	—	—	—	—	—
2019–20	Bílí Tygři Liberec	CZE	6	2	4	—	0	358	16	1	2.68	.897	—	—	—	—	—	—	—	—
2019–20	HC Benátky nad Jizerou	CZE-2	14	6	7	—	0	—	—	1	2.55	.918	—	—	—	—	—	—	—	—
2020–21	HC Mladá Boleslav	CZE	1	1	0	—	0	60	2	0	2.00	.931	—	—	—	—	—	—	—	—
2020–21	HC Slovan Ústí nad Labem	CZE-2	8	4	4	—	0	—	—	0	3.18	.876	—	—	—	—	—	—	—	—
2021–22	HC Mladá Boleslav	CZE	2	0	1	—	0	62	3	0	2.90	.857	—	—	—	—	—	—	—	—
2022–23	HC Mladá Boleslav-2	CZE-4	9	—	—	—	—	—	—	—	3.56	—	1	0	1	—	—	—	3.12	—
NHL totals			1,044	489	392	33	91	59,879	2,515	77	2.52	.919	70	34	35	4,295	178	5	2.49	.918

=== International ===
Year	Team	Event	GP	W	L	T	MIN	GA	SO	GAA	SV%
2003	Czech Republic	U18	5	1	3	0	280	10	0	2.14	.940
2004	Czech Republic	WJC	6	2	4	1	389	18	1	2.78	.904
2005	Czech Republic	WJC	6	4	2	0	362	13	1	2.15	.925
2006	Czech Republic	WJC	3	1	2	0	141	6	0	2.56	.909
Junior totals			20	8	11	1	1172	47	2	2.41	—

Awards and achievements
Preceded by Shawn Belle	St. Louis Blues first-round draft pick 2004	Succeeded by T. J. Oshie
