= Dmitri Shitikov =

Russian ice hockey player

- Born: January 21, 1986 (age 39) Tyumen, Russian SFSR, USSR
- Height: 5 ft 10 in (178 cm)
- Weight: 187 lb (85 kg; 13 st 5 lb)
- Position: Right wing
- Shoots: Left
- KHL team Former teams: Free Agent; HC Dinamo Minsk; Dynamo Moscow; SKA Saint Petersburg; Severstal Cherepovets; Amur Khabarovsk; Sibir Novosibirsk; HC Vityaz; HK Poprad
- Playing career: 2001–present

Dmitri Shitikov (born January 21, 1986) is a Russian professional ice hockey forward who is currently an unrestricted free agent. He most recently played for HC Vityaz of the Kontinental Hockey League (KHL).
