= Michal Pšurný =

Czech ice hockey player

- Born: February 23, 1986 (age 40) Gottwaldov, Czechoslovakia
- Height: 6 ft 1 in (185 cm)
- Weight: 181 lb (82 kg; 12 st 13 lb)
- Position: Right wing
- Shoots: Right
- team Former teams: Free agent PSG Berani Zlín; HC České Budějovice; Manchester Phoenix; TMH Polonia Bytom
- Playing career: 2004–present

Michal Pšurný (born February 23, 1986) is a Czech professional ice hockey right winger.

Pšurný played a total of 115 games in the Czech Extraliga with HC Zlín and HC České Budějovice. He moved to the Manchester Phoenix in the English Premier Ice Hockey League on September 14, 2012 and stayed for three seasons, helping them win the Playoff Championship in 2013 and the League Championship in 2014.

His twin brother Roman Pšurný is also a professional ice hockey player and was drafted by the New York Rangers in 2004.
