= Roman Pšurný =

Czech ice hockey player

- Born: February 23, 1986 (age 40) Gottwaldov, Czechoslovakia
- Height: 6 ft 1 in (185 cm)
- Weight: 181 lb (82 kg; 12 st 13 lb)
- Position: Left wing
- Shoots: Left
- Czech Extraliga team: HC České Budějovice
- National team: Czech Republic
- NHL draft: 135th overall, 2004; New York Rangers
- Playing career: 2003–present

Roman Pšurný (born February 23, 1986) is a Czech professional ice hockey player. He was selected by the New York Rangers in the 5th round (135th overall) of the 2004 NHL entry draft.

Pšurný played with HC České Budějovice in the Czech Extraliga during the 2010–11 Czech Extraliga season. He played previously for BK Mladá Boleslav, HC Hamé Zlín, HC Slovan Ústí nad Labem and SK Horácká Slavia Třebíč.

== Career statistics ==
=== Regular season and playoffs ===
| | | | Regular season | | | | | Playoffs |
| Season | Team | League | GP | G | A | Pts | PIM | GP | G | A | Pts | PIM |
|---|---|---|---|---|---|---|---|---|---|---|---|---|
| 2000–01 | HC Barum Continental Zlín | CZE U18 | 1 | 0 | 0 | 0 | 0 | — | — | — | — | — |
| 2001–02 | HC Continental Zlín | CZE U18 | 42 | 19 | 36 | 55 | 57 | 6 | 3 | 3 | 6 | 6 |
| 2002–03 | HC Hamé Zlín | CZE U18 | 22 | 17 | 27 | 44 | 20 | 3 | 1 | 1 | 2 | 4 |
| 2002–03 | HC Hamé Zlín | CZE U20 | 15 | 3 | 7 | 10 | 0 | — | — | — | — | — |
| 2003–04 | HC Hamé Zlín | CZE U20 | 52 | 18 | 33 | 51 | 104 | 5 | 0 | 0 | 0 | 2 |
| 2003–04 | HC Hamé Zlín | ELH | 9 | 0 | 0 | 0 | 0 | — | — | — | — | — |
| 2004–05 | Medicine Hat Tigers | WHL | 69 | 21 | 28 | 49 | 64 | 13 | 1 | 4 | 5 | 16 |
| 2005–06 | Medicine Hat Tigers | WHL | 66 | 24 | 30 | 54 | 54 | 13 | 4 | 7 | 11 | 10 |
| 2006–07 | HC Hamé Zlín | ELH | 45 | 4 | 2 | 6 | 20 | — | — | — | — | — |
| 2006–07 | SK Horácká Slavia Třebíč | CZE.2 | 7 | 2 | 1 | 3 | 8 | — | — | — | — | — |
| 2007–08 | RI Okna Zlín | ELH | 45 | 3 | 5 | 8 | 46 | — | — | — | — | — |
| 2007–08 | HK Jestřábi Prostějov | CZE.2 | 9 | 6 | 3 | 9 | 18 | — | — | — | — | — |
| 2008–09 | BK Mladá Boleslav | ELH | 30 | 3 | 1 | 4 | 6 | — | — | — | — | — |
| 2008–09 | SK Horácká Slavia Třebíč | CZE.2 | 11 | 4 | 9 | 13 | 43 | — | — | — | — | — |
| 2009–10 | HC Slovan Ústečtí Lvi | CZE.2 | 37 | 23 | 15 | 38 | 14 | 14 | 4 | 5 | 9 | 10 |
| 2010–11 | HC Mountfield | ELH | 52 | 10 | 17 | 27 | 30 | 6 | 1 | 0 | 1 | 6 |
| 2011–12 | HC Mountfield | ELH | 50 | 2 | 4 | 6 | 26 | 2 | 0 | 0 | 0 | 0 |
| 2012–13 | HC Verva Litvínov | ELH | 42 | 5 | 9 | 14 | 16 | 7 | 0 | 0 | 0 | 0 |
| 2012–13 | HC Slovan Ústečtí Lvi | CZE.2 | 3 | 1 | 1 | 2 | 0 | — | — | — | — | — |
| 2013–14 | HC Verva Litvínov | ELH | 32 | 1 | 1 | 2 | 2 | — | — | — | — | — |
| 2013–14 | HC Most | CZE.2 | 3 | 3 | 2 | 5 | 0 | — | — | — | — | — |
| 2013–14 | ČEZ Motor České Budějovice | CZE.2 | 10 | 3 | 5 | 8 | 6 | — | — | — | — | — |
| 2014–15 | HC Energie Karlovy Vary | ELH | 40 | 5 | 1 | 6 | 32 | — | — | — | — | — |
| 2015–16 | HC Zubr Přerov | CZE.2 | 49 | 16 | 33 | 49 | 34 | 4 | 1 | 0 | 1 | 31 |
| 2016–17 | HC Zubr Přerov | CZE.2 | 29 | 12 | 19 | 31 | 22 | 8 | 2 | 6 | 8 | 10 |
| 2017–18 | HC Zubr Přerov | CZE.2 | 52 | 10 | 24 | 34 | 48 | 4 | 0 | 1 | 1 | 0 |
| 2018–19 | HC Zubr Přerov | CZE.2 | 53 | 14 | 30 | 44 | 64 | 5 | 0 | 1 | 1 | 4 |
| 2019–20 | HC Zubr Přerov | CZE.2 | 55 | 27 | 26 | 53 | 22 | — | — | — | — | — |
| 2019–20 | PSG Berani Zlín | ELH | 1 | 0 | 0 | 0 | 0 | — | — | — | — | — |
| 2020–21 | HC Zubr Přerov | CZE.2 | 32 | 12 | 21 | 33 | 14 | 4 | 0 | 0 | 0 | 2 |
| 2020–21 | PSG Berani Zlín | ELH | 3 | 0 | 0 | 0 | 4 | — | — | — | — | — |
| 2021–22 | HC Zubr Přerov | CZE.2 | 21 | 2 | 13 | 15 | 6 | — | — | — | — | — |
| 2021–22 | VHK ROBE Vsetín | CZE.2 | 22 | 8 | 14 | 22 | 14 | 3 | 0 | 0 | 0 | 0 |
| ELH totals | | | 349 | 33 | 40 | 73 | 182 | 15 | 1 | 0 | 1 | 6 |
| CZE.2 totals | | | 393 | 143 | 216 | 359 | 313 | 42 | 7 | 13 | 20 | 57 |

=== International ===
| Year | Team | Event | GP | G | A | Pts | PIM |
|---|---|---|---|---|---|---|---|
| 2003 | Czech Republic | U18 | 5 |
| 2004 | Czech Republic | WJC18 | 7 | 2 | 3 | 5 | 16 |
| Junior totals | | | 7 | 2 | 3 | 5 | 16 |
