= Michal Gulaši =

Czech ice hockey defenceman

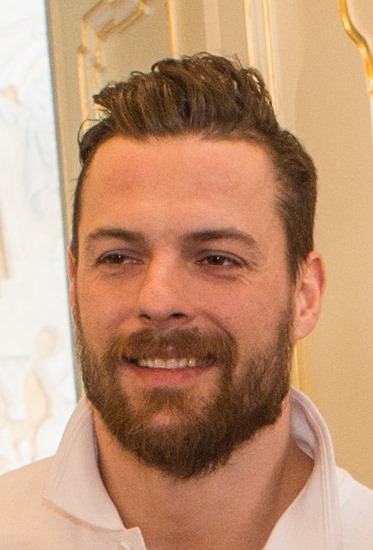
- Born: 18 July 1986 (age 39) Ostrava, Czechoslovakia
- Height: 5 ft 11 in (180 cm)
- Weight: 194 lb (88 kg; 13 st 12 lb)
- Position: Defence
- Shoots: Left
- ELH team Former teams: HC Kometa Brno; HC Vítkovice; Lethbridge Hurricanes; AZ Havířov; BK Mladá Boleslav; HC Sparta Praha; HC Energie Karlovy Vary; Södertälje SK
- NHL draft: Undrafted
- Playing career: 2005–present

Michal Gulaši (born 18 July 1986) is a Czech professional ice hockey player. He currently plays with HC Kometa Brno in the Czech Extraliga (ELH).

== Playing career ==
Gulaši played as a youth within HC Vítkovice through to the under 18 and 20 levels before continuing his development in North America, playing major junior with the Lethbridge Hurricanes of the Western Hockey League (WHL).

Undrafted, Gulaši returned to his native Czech Republic with HC Vítkovice, to start his professional career in the Czech Extraliga in the 2005–06 season.

He later played with HC Sparta Praha from 2008 to 2011, and HC Energie Karlovy Vary from 2011 to 2016, with a season stint in the Swedish HockeyAllsvenskan for Södertälje SK.

Gulaši joined his fourth Extraliga club, HC Kometa Brno for the 2016–17 season.

== Career statistics ==
=== Regular season and playoffs ===
			Regular season					Playoffs
Season	Team	League	GP	G	A	Pts	PIM	GP	G	A	Pts	PIM

=== International ===
Year	Team	Event	Result	GP	G	A	Pts	PIM
