= 2003 U-18 Junior World Cup =

Tournament details
- Host countries: Czech Republic; Slovakia
- Venues: 2 (in 2 host cities)
- Dates: August 11–16, 2003
- Teams: 8

Final positions
- Champions: United States (1st title)

Tournament statistics
- Games played: 18

The 2003 U-18 Junior World Cup was an under-18 international ice hockey tournament held in Břeclav, Czech Republic and Piešťany, Slovakia from August 11–16, 2003. The United States captured their first gold medal at the tournament, defeating Russia 3–2 in the gold medal game. The Czech Republic earned the bronze medal with an 8–2 win over Team Canada.

== Medal round ==
=== Bronze medal game ===
August 15, 2003	Czech Republic	8–2	Canada	Breclav

=== Gold medal game ===
August 16, 2003	United States	3–2	Russia	Breclav

== Final standings ==
Rk.	Team
1st place, gold medalist(s)	United States
2nd place, silver medalist(s)	Russia
3rd place, bronze medalist(s)	Czech Republic
4.	Canada
5.	Slovakia
6.	Sweden
7.	Finland
8.	Switzerland

== See also ==
- 2003 IIHF World U18 Championships
- 2003 World Junior Championships

Preceded by 1992 Pacific Cup	U-18 Junior World Cup; 2003	Succeeded by 2004 U-18 Junior World Cup
