= 2006–07 Buffalo Sabres season =

NHL hockey team season

2006–07 Buffalo Sabres
- Presidents' Trophy winners
- Northeast Division champions
- Division: 1st Northeast
- Conference: 1st Eastern
- 2006–07 record: 53–22–7
- Home record: 28–10–3
- Road record: 25–12–4
- Goals for: 308
- Goals against: 242

Team information
- General manager: Darcy Regier
- Coach: Lindy Ruff
- Captain: Daniel Briere and Chris Drury
- Alternate captains: Teppo Numminen
- Arena: HSBC Arena
- Average attendance: 18,690
- Minor league affiliate: Rochester Americans

Team leaders
- Goals: Thomas Vanek (43)
- Assists: Daniel Briere (63)
- Points: Daniel Briere (95)
- Penalty minutes: Adam Mair (128)
- Plus/minus: Thomas Vanek (+47)
- Wins: Ryan Miller (40)
- Goals against average: Ryan Miller (2.73)

The 2006–07 Buffalo Sabres season was the 37th season of operation, 36th season of play, for the National Hockey League (NHL) franchise that was established on May 22, 1970. The season began with the team attempting to rebound from a disappointing end to the 2005–06 season, in which the Sabres advanced to the Eastern Conference finals before losing in five games to the eventual Stanley Cup finalist, the Ottawa Senators.

With the best regular-season record in the NHL, the Sabres were awarded the Presidents' Trophy for the first time in franchise history, and they also earned the top seed in the Eastern Conference playoffs. They defeated the New York Islanders and the New York Rangers in the first two rounds of the playoffs. In the Eastern Conference finals, however, the Sabres' season came to an end when they were defeated by the Ottawa Senators in five games. This was the last season in which the Sabres won a playoff series and the team's last 50-win season until the 2025–26 season.

== Offseason ==
The team lost several veterans to free agency, including J. P. Dumont, Jay McKee, Mike Grier, and Rory Fitzpatrick. Conversely, the team signed only one new player to the roster: defenseman Jaroslav Spacek. The team planned to rely on young players from their own organization – Jiri Novotny, Paul Gaustad and Nathan Paetsch, to name a few—to fill the holes left by the departing players.

Controversy swirled around the team's logo and jersey, meanwhile, as the look was changed. The team's colors were reverted to blue and gold, which they had worn from their addition to the league as an expansion team until 1996–97, when the colors were changed to black and red. The new logo, though, was said to resemble to many a slug or a wig. There were strong efforts to prevent the team from wearing this new jersey, although none were successful. The team's new third jersey, meanwhile, featured the team's original logo. Despite the controversy, the NHL reported that sales of Sabres merchandise were up approximately 1170% from the 2005–2006 season.

== Regular season ==
The Sabres were very successful early in the season, tying an NHL record by winning their first ten games, before finally suffering a shootout loss to the Atlanta Thrashers. They did not lose a game in regulation until exactly one month into the season, in their thirteenth game, when they lost to Toronto. The Sabres also set an NHL record by winning their first ten road games of the season, not losing outside of HSBC Arena until November 18 in Ottawa. This record would not be broken until 2023, when the Los Angeles Kings won their 11th straight road game to start the season.

On January 9, it was announced that three members of the Sabres had been voted to start the All-Star Game for the Eastern Conference: forward Daniel Briere, defenseman Brian Campbell, and goaltender Ryan Miller. It was the first All-Star appearance for each. In addition, as the Sabres had the best record in the Eastern Conference as of the end of All-Star voting, head coach Lindy Ruff was assigned to coach the Eastern Conference team. Briere recorded a goal and four assists in the game, and was named Most Valuable Player of the game. Thomas Vanek was also invited to All-Star Weekend to play in the YoungStars game.

On January 13, Jason Pominville recorded his 20th goal of the season, becoming the fourth Sabre (after Chris Drury, Thomas Vanek and Maxim Afinogenov) to record 20 goals before the All-Star break. At the time of Pominville's 20th goal, no other team in the NHL had more than two players with 20 goals. Daniel Briere became the fifth Sabre to record 20 goals as he scored a hat-trick on January 30 against the Boston Bruins. With the feat, the Sabres became the first team since the 1995–96 Pittsburgh Penguins to have five 20–goal scorers before February. Four Sabres would go on to reach the 30-goal plateau. For the first time in 12 years, Buffalo was not shut-out in any of their 82 regular season games. Moreover, the Sabres led the NHL in goals scored and became the first team to score at least 200 even-strength goals during the regular season since the New Jersey Devils in 2000–01.

In February, the Sabres found themselves battling injury problems. Forward Tim Connolly had been on the long-term injury list all season, and he was joined by Paul Gaustad when a tendon in his leg was sliced on February 7 against the Ottawa Senators. Jaroslav Spacek broke his left hand soon thereafter, and the Sabres lost Maxim Afinogenov, who broke his left wrist, and Jiri Novotny with a high ankle sprain. Ales Kotalik was next to go down, with a knee sprain, and forward Daniel Paille broke his finger. Against the Ottawa Senators on February 22, captain Chris Drury was injured by a blow to the head by Chris Neil, sparking a wild brawl which saw a fight between Martin Biron and Senators goaltender Ray Emery, and later between Emery and Sabres enforcer Andrew Peters.

The Sabres were the last team to be involved in a trade in the 2006–07 season. On the day of the NHL trade deadline, though, they made four trades. Goaltender Martin Biron, who had been the longest-tenured Sabre, was sent to Philadelphia for Philadelphia's second-round pick in the 2007 NHL entry draft. Buffalo's fifth-round pick in that draft was sent to Columbus in exchange for another backup goalie, Ty Conklin. Jiri Novotny was sent along with Buffalo's 2007 first-round pick to Washington in exchange for Dainius Zubrus and Timo Helbling. Finally, the Sabres sent their fourth-round pick in 2007 to Nashville for Mikko Lehtonen, a minor league defenseman.

Due to injuries, many Sabres prospects were called up from the team's American Hockey League affiliate, the Rochester Americans, and made their NHL debuts during the season; Mike Card, Michael Funk, Patrick Kaleta, Clarke MacArthur, Mark Mancari, Michael Ryan, Andrej Sekera and Drew Stafford all played their first career NHL game during the 2006–07 season.

The Sabres finished with 298 goals scored (excluding 10 shootout-winning goals), the most in the League.

=== Season standings ===
Northeast Division
No.	CR		GP	W	L	OTL	GF	GA	Pts
1	1	**Buffalo Sabres**	82	53	22	7	308	242	113
2	4	**Ottawa Senators**	82	48	25	9	288	222	105
3	9	Toronto Maple Leafs	82	40	31	11	258	269	91
4	10	Montreal Canadiens	82	42	34	6	245	256	90
5	13	Boston Bruins	82	35	41	6	219	289	76

Note: No. = Division rank, CR = Conference rank, W = Wins, L = Losses, T = Ties, GF = Goals For, GA = Goals Against, Pts = Points
Teams that qualified for the playoffs are highlighted in bold.

Eastern Conference
R		Div	GP	W	L	OTL	GF	GA	Pts
**1**	**P -** Buffalo Sabres	**NE**	**82**	**53**	**22**	**7**	**308**	**242**	113
**2**	**Y -** New Jersey Devils	**AT**	**82**	**49**	**24**	**9**	**216**	**201**	107
**3**	**Y -** Atlanta Thrashers	**SE**	**82**	**43**	**28**	**11**	**246**	**245**	97
**4**	**X -** Ottawa Senators	**NE**	**82**	**48**	**25**	**9**	**288**	**222**	105
**5**	**X -** Pittsburgh Penguins	**AT**	**82**	**47**	**24**	**11**	**277**	**246**	105
**6**	**X -** New York Rangers	**AT**	**82**	**42**	**30**	**10**	**242**	**216**	94
**7**	**X -** Tampa Bay Lightning	**SE**	**82**	**44**	**33**	**5**	**253**	**261**	93
**8**	**X -** New York Islanders	**AT**	**82**	**40**	**30**	**12**	**248**	**240**	92
8.5
9	Toronto Maple Leafs	NE	82	40	31	11	258	269	91
10	Montreal Canadiens	NE	82	42	34	6	245	256	90
11	Carolina Hurricanes	SE	82	40	34	8	241	253	88
12	Florida Panthers	SE	82	35	31	16	247	257	86
13	Boston Bruins	NE	82	35	41	6	219	289	76
14	Washington Capitals	SE	82	28	40	14	235	286	70
15	Philadelphia Flyers	AT	82	22	48	12	214	303	56

Divisions: AT – Atlantic, NE – Northeast, SE – Southeast

P – Clinched Presidents Trophy; Y – Clinched division; X – Clinched playoff spot

== Playoffs ==
The Sabres earned the #1 seed in the Eastern Conference by virtue of finishing with the highest point total in the conference.

=== Eastern Conference quarterfinals: vs. (8) New York Islanders ===
The Sabres faced the New York Islanders in the first round of the playoffs.

=== Eastern Conference semifinals: vs. (6) New York Rangers ===
The Sabres faced the New York Rangers in the second round of the playoffs. The Rangers advanced by sweeping the Atlanta Thrashers, the number three seed, in the first round.

=== Eastern Conference finals: vs. (4) Ottawa Senators ===
The Sabres faced their division rivals, the Ottawa Senators, in the Eastern Conference finals. The Senators advanced by defeating the Pittsburgh Penguins in the first round and the New Jersey Devils in the second. The Sabres lost the series, four games to one.

== Schedule and results ==
=== Regular season ===
2006–07 regular season
October: 10–0–1 (home: 4–0–1; road: 6–0–0)

Game	Date	Visitor	Score	Home	OT	Decision	Attendance	Record	Points	Recap
1	October 4	Buffalo	3 – 2	Carolina	SO	Miller	18,840	1–0–0	2	W
2	October 6	Montreal	4 – 5	Buffalo	SO	Miller	18,690	2–0–0	4	W
3	October 7	Buffalo	4 – 3	Ottawa		Biron	19,202	3–0–0	6	W
4	October 13	Buffalo	3 – 2	Detroit	SO	Miller	20,066	4–0–0	8	W
5	October 14	NY Rangers	4 – 7	Buffalo		Miller	18,690	5–0–0	10	W
6	October 17	Philadelphia	1 – 9	Buffalo		Miller	18,690	6–0–0	12	W
7	October 20	Carolina	4 – 5	Buffalo		Miller	18,690	7–0–0	14	W
8	October 21	Buffalo	6 – 2	Boston		Biron	14,382	8–0–0	16	W
9	October 23	Buffalo	4 – 1	Montreal		Miller	21,273	9–0–0	18	W
10	October 26	Buffalo	3 – 0	NY Islanders		Miller	8,861	10–0–0	20	W
11	October 28	Atlanta	5 – 4	Buffalo	SO	Miller	18,690	10–0–1	21	OTL

November: 9–3–1 (home: 4–2–1; road: 5–1–0)

Game	Date	Visitor	Score	Home	OT	Decision	Attendance	Record	Points	Recap
12	November 2	Buffalo	5 – 4	Boston	SO	Miller	12,547	11–0–1	23	W
13	November 4	Toronto	4 – 1	Buffalo		Miller	18,690	11–1–1	23	L
14	November 5	Buffalo	4 – 3	NY Rangers	OT	Biron	18,200	12–1–1	25	W
15	November 10	Florida	4 – 5	Buffalo	OT	Biron	18,690	13–1–1	27	W
16	November 11	Buffalo	5 – 4	Philadelphia	OT	Biron	19,633	14–1–1	29	W
17	November 13	Buffalo	7 – 4	Carolina		Biron	14,387	15–1–1	31	W
18	November 15	Ottawa	4 – 2	Buffalo		Biron	18,690	15–2–1	31	L
19	November 17	Pittsburgh	2 – 4	Buffalo		Biron	18,690	16–2–1	33	W
20	November 18	Buffalo	1 – 4	Ottawa		Miller	19,770	16–3–1	33	L
21	November 20	Tampa Bay	2 – 7	Buffalo		Miller	18,690	17–3–1	35	W
22	November 22	Toronto	4 – 7	Buffalo		Miller	18,690	18–3–1	37	W
23	November 24	Montreal	2 – 1	Buffalo	OT	Miller	18,690	18–3–2	38	OTL
24	November 26	Buffalo	3 – 2	NY Rangers	OT	Miller	18,200	19–3–2	40	W

December: 9–4–1 (home: 5–2–0; road: 4–2–1)

Game	Date	Visitor	Score	Home	OT	Decision	Attendance	Record	Points	Recap
25	December 1	NY Rangers	3 – 4	Buffalo	SO	Miller	18,690	20–3–2	42	W
26	December 2	Buffalo	4 – 7	Washington		Biron	17,162	20–4–2	42	L
27	December 5	Buffalo	4 – 1	Tampa Bay		Miller	20,025	21–4–2	44	W
28	December 7	Buffalo	1 – 3	Florida		Miller	15,385	21–5–2	44	L
29	December 9	Buffalo	3 – 2	Montreal	SO	Miller	21,273	22–5–2	46	W
30	December 12	Buffalo	3 – 2	New Jersey		Miller	11,156	23–5–2	48	W
31	December 14	Florida	1 – 2	Buffalo		Miller	18,690	24–5–2	50	W
32	December 16	Ottawa	3 – 1	Buffalo		Miller	18,690	24–6–2	50	L
33	December 19	Montreal	5 – 2	Buffalo		Miller	18,690	24–7–2	50	L
34	December 21	Buffalo	7 – 2	Nashville		Biron	16,616	25–7–2	52	W
35	December 23	Buffalo	2 – 3	St. Louis	OT	Biron	12,513	25–7–3	53	OTL
36	December 26	Washington	3 – 6	Buffalo		Miller	18,690	26–7–3	55	W
37	December 28	Carolina	1 – 4	Buffalo		Miller	18,690	27–7–3	57	W
38	December 30	Atlanta	1 – 4	Buffalo		Miller	18,690	28–7–3	59	W

January: 6–7–1 (home: 4–3–0; road: 2–4–1)

Game	Date	Visitor	Score	Home	OT	Decision	Attendance	Record	Points	Recap
39	January 1	NY Islanders	1 – 3	Buffalo		Miller	18,690	29–7–3	61	W
40	January 3	Buffalo	3 – 6	Ottawa		Miller	19,777	29–8–3	61	L
41	January 5	Pittsburgh	4 – 2	Buffalo		Miller	18,690	29–9–3	61	L
42	January 6	Buffalo	4 – 3	Toronto		Biron	19,487	30–9–3	63	W
43	January 10	Buffalo	2 – 1	Chicago		Miller	14,041	31–9–3	65	W
44	January 11	Toronto	4 – 2	Buffalo		Biron	18,690	31–10–3	65	L
45	January 13	Tampa Bay	3 – 2	Buffalo		Miller	18,690	31–11–3	65	L
46	January 15	Buffalo	2 – 3	Boston	SO	Miller	15,585	31–11–4	66	OTL
47	January 17	Boston	3 – 6	Buffalo		Miller	18,690	32–11–4	68	W
48	January 19	Vancouver	3 – 4	Buffalo	SO	Miller	18,690	33–11–4	70	W
49	January 20	Buffalo	3 – 4	Montreal		Biron	21,273	33–12–4	70	L
50	January 26	Buffalo	2 – 3	Columbus		Miller	18,136	33–13–4	70	L
51	January 27	Buffalo	3 – 5	NY Islanders		Miller	15,218	33–14–4	70	L
52	January 30	Boston	1 – 7	Buffalo		Biron	18,690	34–14–4	72	W

February: 8–2–1 (home: 5–0–1; road: 3–2–0)

Game	Date	Visitor	Score	Home	OT	Decision	Attendance	Record	Points	Recap
53	February 1	Buffalo	3 – 1	Boston		Biron	13,853	35–14–4	74	W
54	February 3	Buffalo	2 – 3	New Jersey		Miller	18,589	35–15–4	74	L
55	February 6	Buffalo	4 – 3	Atlanta	SO	Miller	17,881	36–15–4	76	W
56	February 7	Ottawa	2 – 3	Buffalo		Biron	18,690	37–15–4	78	W
57	February 10	Calgary	2 – 3	Buffalo	SO	Miller	18,690	38–15–4	80	W
58	February 15	Edmonton	1 – 2	Buffalo	OT	Miller	18,690	39–15–4	82	W
59	February 17	Boston	4 – 3	Buffalo	SO	Miller	18,690	39–15–5	83	OTL
60	February 20	Philadelphia	3 – 6	Buffalo		Miller	18,690	40–15–5	85	W
61	February 22	Ottawa	5 – 6	Buffalo	SO	Miller	18,690	41–15–5	87	W
62	February 24	Buffalo	5 – 6	Ottawa		Miller	20,040	41–16–5	87	L
63	February 27	Buffalo	6 – 1	Toronto		Miller	19,588	42–16–5	89	W

March: 8–5–2 (home: 5–3–0; road: 3–2–2)

Game	Date	Visitor	Score	Home	OT	Decision	Attendance	Record	Points	Recap
64	March 2	Montreal	5 – 8	Buffalo		Miller	18,690	43–16–5	91	W
65	March 3	Buffalo	3 – 1	Toronto		Miller	19,515	44–16–5	93	W
66	March 7	Colorado	3 – 2	Buffalo		Miller	18,690	44–17–5	93	L
67	March 9	Minnesota	5 – 1	Buffalo		Miller	18,690	44–18–5	93	L
68	March 10	New Jersey	3 – 2	Buffalo		Miller	18,690	44–19–5	93	L
69	March 13	Buffalo	4 – 5	Pittsburgh	SO	Miller	17,132	44–19–6	94	OTL
70	March 15	Buffalo	5 – 3	Florida		Conklin	18,111	45–19–6	96	W
71	March 16	Buffalo	3 – 2	Tampa Bay		Miller	21,264	46–19–6	98	W
72	March 18	Buffalo	3 – 4	Atlanta	OT	Miller	18,602	46–19–7	99	OTL
73	March 21	Washington	2 – 5	Buffalo		Miller	18,690	47–19–7	101	W
74	March 23	Toronto	4 – 5	Buffalo		Miller	18,690	48–19–7	103	W
75	March 24	Buffalo	1 – 4	Toronto		Miller	19,571	48–20–7	103	L
76	March 28	New Jersey	3 – 4	Buffalo		Miller	18,690	49–20–7	105	W
77	March 30	NY Islanders	4 – 6	Buffalo		Miller	18,690	50–20–7	107	W
78	March 31	Buffalo	3 – 4	Montreal		Conklin	21,273	50–21–7	107	L

April: 3–1–0 (home: 1–0–0; road: 2–1–0)

Game	Date	Visitor	Score	Home	OT	Decision	Attendance	Record	Points	Recap
79	April 3	Buffalo	4 – 1	Pittsburgh		Miller	17,132	51–21–7	109	W
80	April 5	Boston	2 – 4	Buffalo		Miller	18,690	52–21–7	111	W
81	April 7	Buffalo	2 – 0	Washington		Miller	18,277	53–21–7	113	W
82	April 8	Buffalo	3 – 4	Philadelphia		Conklin	19,027	53–22–7	113	L

Legend: W Win (2 points) L Loss (0 points) OTL Overtime/shootout loss (1 point)

=== Playoffs ===
2007 Stanley Cup playoffs
Eastern Conference Quarterfinals vs. (8) New York Islanders – Sabres win 4–1

Game	Date	Visitor	Score	Home	OT	Decision	Attendance	Series	Recap
1	April 12	NY Islanders	1 – 4	Buffalo		Miller	18,690	Sabres lead 1–0	W
2	April 14	NY Islanders	3 – 2	Buffalo		Miller	18,690	Series tied 1–1	L
3	April 16	Buffalo	3 – 2	NY Islanders		Miller	16,234	Sabres lead 2–1	W
4	April 18	Buffalo	4 – 2	NY Islanders		Miller	16,234	Sabres lead 3–1	W
5	April 20	NY Islanders	3 – 4	Buffalo		Miller	18,690	Sabres win 4–1	W

Eastern Conference Semifinals vs. (6) New York Rangers – Sabres win 4–2

Game	Date	Visitor	Score	Home	OT	Decision	Attendance	Series	Recap
1	April 25	NY Rangers	2 – 5	Buffalo		Miller	18,690	Sabres lead 1–0	W
2	April 27	NY Rangers	2 – 3	Buffalo		Miller	18,690	Sabres lead 2–0	W
3	April 29	Buffalo	1 – 2	NY Rangers	2OT	Miller	18,200	Sabres lead 2–1	L
4	May 1	Buffalo	1 – 2	NY Rangers		Miller	18,200	Series tied 2–2	L
5	May 4	NY Rangers	1 – 2	Buffalo	OT	Miller	18,690	Sabres lead 3–2	W
6	May 6	Buffalo	5 – 4	NY Rangers		Miller	18,200	Sabres win 4–2	W

Eastern Conference Finals vs. (4) Ottawa Senators – Senators win 4–1

Game	Date	Visitor	Score	Home	OT	Decision	Attendance	Series	Recap
1	May 10	Ottawa	5 – 2	Buffalo		Miller	18,690	Senators lead 1–0	L
2	May 12	Ottawa	4 – 3	Buffalo	2OT	Miller	18,690	Senators lead 2–0	L
3	May 14	Buffalo	0 – 1	Ottawa		Miller	20,171	Senators lead 3–0	L
4	May 16	Buffalo	3 – 2	Ottawa		Miller	20,294	Senators lead 3–1	W
5	May 19	Ottawa	3 – 2	Buffalo	OT	Miller	18,690	Senators win 4–1	L

Legend: W Win L Loss

== Player statistics ==
=== Scoring ===
- Position abbreviations: C = Center; D = Defense; G = Goaltender; LW = Left wing; RW = Right wing
- † = Joined team via a transaction (e.g., trade, waivers, signing) during the season. Stats reflect time with the Sabres only.
- ‡ = Left team via a transaction (e.g., trade, waivers, release) during the season. Stats reflect time with the Sabres only.

No.	Player	Pos	Regular season						Playoffs					
No.	Player	Pos	GP	G	A	Pts	+/-	PIM	GP	G	A	Pts	+/-	PIM
48	Daniel Briere	C	81	32	63	95	17	89	16	3	12	15	3	16
26	Thomas Vanek	LW	82	43	41	84	47	40	16	6	4	10	2	10
23	Chris Drury	C	77	37	32	69	1	30	16	8	5	13	3	2
29	Jason Pominville	RW	82	34	34	68	25	30	16	4	6	10	2	0
9	Derek Roy	C	75	21	42	63	37	60	16	2	5	7	3	14
61	Maxim Afinogenov	RW	56	23	38	61	19	66	15	5	4	9	3	6
55	Jochen Hecht	C	76	19	37	56	19	39	16	4	1	5	2	10
51	Brian Campbell	D	82	6	42	48	28	35	16	3	4	7	0	14
12	Ales Kotalik	RW	66	16	22	38	−5	46	16	2	2	4	−3	8
45	Dmitri Kalinin	D	82	7	22	29	19	36	16	2	3	5	9	14
27	Teppo Numminen	D	79	2	27	29	17	32	16	0	4	4	10	4
21	Drew Stafford	RW	41	13	14	27	5	33	10	2	2	4	3	4
38	Nathan Paetsch	D	63	2	22	24	10	50	—	—	—	—	—	—
28	Paul Gaustad	C	54	9	13	22	11	74	7	0	1	1	−1	2
6	Jaroslav Spacek	D	65	5	16	21	20	62	16	0	0	0	3	10
5	Toni Lydman	D	67	2	17	19	10	55	16	2	2	4	−5	14
10	Henrik Tallinder	D	47	4	10	14	19	34	16	0	2	2	−4	10
13	Jiri Novotny‡	C	50	6	7	13	−2	26	—	—	—	—	—	—
20	Daniel Paille	LW	29	3	8	11	5	18	1	0	0	0	0	0
22	Adam Mair	C	82	2	9	11	−1	128	16	1	4	5	5	10
15	Dainius Zubrus†	RW	19	4	4	8	−3	12	15	0	8	8	1	8
41	Clarke MacArthur	LW	19	3	4	7	4	4	—	—	—	—	—	—
37	Michael Ryan	C	19	3	2	5	−8	2	—	—	—	—	—	—
76	Andrew Peters	LW	58	1	1	2	−1	125	—	—	—	—	—	—
3	Michael Funk	D	5	0	2	2	2	0	—	—	—	—	—	—
36	Patrick Kaleta	RW	7	0	2	2	3	21	—	—	—	—	—	—
30	Ryan Miller	G	63	0	2	2		2	16	0	0	0		2
19	Tim Connolly	C	2	1	0	1	1	2	16	0	9	9	6	4
25	Mark Mancari	RW	3	0	1	1	−1	2	—	—	—	—	—	—
43	Martin Biron‡	G	19	0	0	0		25	—	—	—	—	—	—
33	Mike Card	D	4	0	0	0	0	0	—	—	—	—	—	—
35	Ty Conklin†	G	5	0	0	0		2	—	—	—	—	—	—
44	Andrej Sekera	D	2	0	0	0	1	2	—	—	—	—	—	—

=== Goaltending ===
- † = Joined team via a transaction (e.g., trade, waivers, signing) during the season. Stats reflect time with the Sabres only.
- ‡ = Left team via a transaction (e.g., trade, waivers, release) during the season. Stats reflect time with the Sabres only.

No.	Player	Regular season										Playoffs								
No.	Player	GP	W	L	OT	SA	GA	GAA	SV%	SO	TOI	GP	W	L	SA	GA	GAA	SV%	SO	TOI
30	Ryan Miller	63	40	16	6	1886	168	2.73	.911	2	3692:11	16	9	7	489	38	2.22	.922	0	1029
43	Martin Biron‡	19	12	4	1	533	54	3.04	.899	0	1066:29	—	—	—	—	—	—	—	—	—
35	Ty Conklin†	5	1	2	0	120	13	3.43	.892	0	227:22	—	—	—	—	—	—	—	—	—

== Awards and records ==
=== Awards ===
Type	Award/honor	Recipient	Ref
League (annual)	NHL Plus-Minus Award	Thomas Vanek	
League (annual)	NHL Second All-Star Team	Thomas Vanek (Left wing)	
League (in-season)	NHL All-Star Game selection	Daniel Briere (Note: Briere, Campbell, and Miller were voted to the starting lineup.)	
League (in-season)	NHL All-Star Game selection	Brian Campbell	
League (in-season)	NHL All-Star Game selection	Ryan Miller	
League (in-season)	NHL All-Star Game selection	Lindy Ruff (coach)	
League (in-season)	NHL First Star of the Month	Ryan Miller (October)	
League (in-season)	NHL First Star of the Week	Maxim Afinogenov (October 22)	
League (in-season)	NHL Rookie of the Month	Drew Stafford (March)	
League (in-season)	NHL YoungStars Game selection	Thomas Vanek	

=== Milestones ===
Milestone	Player	Date	Ref
First game	Drew Stafford	November 5, 2006	
First game	Mike Card	November 11, 2006	
First game	Michael Funk	November 18, 2006	
First game	Michael Ryan	November 22, 2006	
First game	Andrej Sekera	December 9, 2006	
First game	Clarke MacArthur	December 19, 2006	
First game	Patrick Kaleta	February 22, 2006	
First game	Mark Mancari	February 24, 2006	

== Transactions ==
The Sabres were involved in the following transactions from June 20, 2006, the day after the deciding game of the 2006 Stanley Cup Finals, through June 6, 2007, the day of the deciding game of the 2007 Stanley Cup Finals.

=== Trades ===
Date	Details		Ref
July 10, 2006	To Edmonton Oilers: Rights to Jan Hejda	To Buffalo Sabres: 7th-round pick in 2007	
July 14, 2006	To Vancouver Canucks: Taylor Pyatt	To Buffalo Sabres: 4th-round pick in 2007	
February 27, 2007	To Philadelphia Flyers: Martin Biron	To Buffalo Sabres: 2nd-round pick in 2007	
February 27, 2007	To Columbus Blue Jackets: 5th-round pick in 2007	To Buffalo Sabres: Ty Conklin	
February 27, 2007	To Washington Capitals: Jiri Novotny; 1st-round pick in 2007	To Buffalo Sabres: Dainius Zubrus; Timo Helbling	
February 27, 2007	To Nashville Predators: 4th-round pick in 2007	To Buffalo Sabres: Mikko Lehtonen	

=== Players acquired ===
Date	Player	Former team	Term	Via	Ref
July 5, 2006	Jaroslav Spacek	Edmonton Oilers	3-year	Free agency	
September 7, 2006	Adam Berkhoel	Atlanta Thrashers		Free agency	

=== Players lost ===
Date	Player	New team	Via (Note: In parentheses is the player's free agency group on July 1 if applicable.)	Ref
July 1, 2006	Jay McKee	St. Louis Blues	Free agency (III)	
July 3, 2006	Mike Grier	San Jose Sharks	Free agency (III)	
July 6, 2006	Doug Janik	Tampa Bay Lightning	Free agency (VI)	
July 13, 2006	Michael Leighton	Anaheim Ducks	Free agency (UFA)	
July 17, 2006	David Cullen	DEG Metro Stars (DEL)	Free agency (III)	
August 2, 2006	Chris Taylor	Frankfurt Lions (DEL)	Free agency (III)	
August 8, 2006	Jean-Pierre Dumont	Nashville Predators (Note: Dumont signed with Nashville on August 29.)	Release (II) (Note: Dumont received a $2.9 million arbitration award on August 2. Buffalo elected to “walk away” from the award, making Dumont an unrestricted free agent.)	
August 18, 2006	Rory Fitzpatrick	Vancouver Canucks	Free agency (III)	
October 3, 2006	Chris Thorburn	Pittsburgh Penguins	Waivers	
October 4, 2006	Sean McMorrow	Chicago Wolves (AHL)	Free agency (UFA)	
October 25, 2006	Jeff Jillson	Eisbaren Berlin (DEL)	Free agency (II)	
June 4, 2007	Timo Helbling	HC Lugano (NLA)	Free agency	

=== Signings ===
Date	Player	Term	Contract type	Ref
July 3, 2006	Teppo Numminen	1-year	Re-signing	
July 10, 2006	Andrew Peters	1-year	Re-signing	
July 11, 2006	Brian Campbell	multi-year	Re-signing	
July 13, 2006	Martin Biron	1-year	Re-signing	
July 14, 2006	Nathan Paetsch	1-year	Re-signing	
July 14, 2006	Derek Roy	1-year	Re-signing	
July 14, 2006	Andrej Sekera	3-year	Entry-level	
July 21, 2006	Henrik Tallinder	multi-year	Re-signing	
July 23, 2006	Ales Kotalik	multi-year	Re-signing	
July 27, 2006	Toni Lydman	multi-year	Re-signing	
July 27, 2006	Jason Pominville	multi-year	Re-signing	
July 28, 2006	Tim Connolly	3-year	Re-signing	
July 30, 2006	Paul Gaustad	2-year	Re-signing	
August 1, 2006	Maxim Afinogenov	3-year	Re-signing	
August 3, 2006	Daniel Briere	1-year	Arbitration award	
August 6, 2006	Adam Mair	1-year	Arbitration award	
August 30, 2006	Dmitri Kalinin	2-year	Re-signing	
September 8, 2006	Ryan Miller	3-year	Re-signing	
September 12, 2006	Jiri Novotny		Re-signing	
September 12, 2006	Michael Ryan		Re-signing	
September 12, 2006	Chris Thorburn		Re-signing	
September 12, 2006	Marek Zagrapan		Entry-level	
October 12, 2006	Adam Dennis	3-year	Entry-level	
June 1, 2007	Marc-Andre Gragnani	3-year	Entry-level	
June 3, 2007	Philip Gogulla	3-year	Entry-level	

== Draft picks ==
Buffalo's picks at the 2006 NHL entry draft in Vancouver, British Columbia. The Sabres had the 24th overall draft pick for their success in the 2005–06 NHL season.

Round	#	Player	Nationality	NHL team	College/junior/club team (league)
1	24	Dennis Persson (D)	Sweden	Buffalo Sabres	VIK Västerås HK (Allsvenskan)
2	46	Jhonas Enroth (G)	Sweden	Buffalo Sabres (from Vancouver)	Södertälje SK (Elitserien)
2	57	Mike Weber (D)	United States	Buffalo Sabres	Windsor Spitfires (OHL)
4	117	Felix Schutz (C)	Germany	Buffalo Sabres	Saint John Sea Dogs (QMJHL)
5	147	Alex Biega (D)	Canada	Buffalo Sabres	Salisbury School (USHS-CN)
7	207	Benjamin Breault (C)	Canada	Buffalo Sabres	Baie-Comeau Drakkar (QMJHL)

== Farm teams ==
The Rochester Americans were the Buffalo Sabres' farm team during the 2006–07 season.

== See also ==
- 2006–07 NHL season
