= Valeri Klimov =

Valeri Klimov is the name of:

- Valeri Klimov (footballer) (born 1974), Russian footballer
- Valeri Klimov (ice hockey) (born 1986), product of the HC Spartak Moscow hockey system
- Valery Klimov (violinist) (born 1931), Russian violinist
