= 2004 NHL entry draft =

2004 North American ice hockey draft

General information
- Date: June 26–27, 2004
- Location: RBC Center; Raleigh, North Carolina, U.S.

Overview
- 291 total selections in 9 rounds
- First selection: (Russia) Alexander Ovechkin (Washington Capitals)
- Hall of Famers: 1: G Pekka Rinne

The 2004 NHL entry draft was the 42nd draft for the National Hockey League. It was held on June 26 and 27, 2004 at the RBC Center in Raleigh, North Carolina. It is especially notable because it was the last NHL event to take place before the beginning of the 2004–05 NHL lockout, which canceled all the games scheduled for that season.

As of 2026, the remaining active players in the NHL from this draft are Evgeni Malkin and Alexander Ovechkin.

== Final central scouting rankings ==
=== Skaters ===
	North American	European
1	(Canada) Cam Barker (D)	(Russia) Alexander Ovechkin (LW)
2	(Canada) Andrew Ladd (LW)	(Russia) Evgeni Malkin (C)
3	(Canada) Alexandre Picard (LW)	(Czech Republic) Rostislav Olesz (C)
4	(Canada) Kyle Chipchura (C)	(Czech Republic) Ladislav Smid (D)
5	(Canada) Wojtek Wolski (LW)	(Finland) Lauri Tukonen (RW)
6	(Slovakia) Boris Valabik (D)	(Slovakia) Andrej Meszaros (D)
7	(United States) Drew Stafford (RW)	(Sweden) Johan Fransson (D)
8	(Canada) Dave Bolland (C)	(Kazakhstan) Viktor Alexandrov (C)
9	(Canada) Mike Green (D)	(Russia) Alexander Radulov (RW)
10	(United States) Rob Schremp (C)	(Finland) Petteri Nokelainen (C)

=== Goaltenders ===
	North American	European
1	(United States) Al Montoya	(Czech Republic) Marek Schwarz
2	(Canada) Devan Dubnyk	(Sweden) Magnus Akerlund
3	(Canada) David Shantz	(Slovakia) Michal Valent

== Selections by round ==
= NHL All-Star team ·	= NHL All-Star (Note: Players are identified as an All-Star if they were selected for the All-Star game at any time in their career.) ·	= NHL All-Star and NHL All-Star team ·	= Hall of Famers

=== Round one ===
#	Player	Nationality	NHL team	College/junior/club team
1	Alexander Ovechkin (LW)	Russia	Washington Capitals	Dynamo Moscow (Russia)
2	Evgeni Malkin (C)	Russia	Pittsburgh Penguins	Metallurg Magnitogorsk (Russia)
3	Cam Barker (D)	Canada	Chicago Blackhawks	Medicine Hat Tigers (WHL)
4	Andrew Ladd (LW)	Canada	Carolina Hurricanes (from Columbus)^{1}	Calgary Hitmen (WHL)
5	Blake Wheeler (RW)	United States	Phoenix Coyotes	Breck School (USHS–MN)
6	Al Montoya (G)	United States	New York Rangers	University of Michigan (CCHA)
7	Rostislav Olesz (C)	Czech Republic	Florida Panthers	HC Vitkovice (Czech Republic)
8	Alexandre Picard (LW)	Canada	Columbus Blue Jackets (from Carolina)^{2}	Lewiston Maineiacs (QMJHL)
9	Ladislav Smid (D)	Czech Republic	Mighty Ducks of Anaheim	Bili Tygri Liberec (Czech Republic)
10	Boris Valabik (D)	Slovakia	Atlanta Thrashers	Kitchener Rangers (OHL)
11	Lauri Tukonen (RW)	Finland	Los Angeles Kings	Espoo Blues (Finland)
12	A. J. Thelen (D)	United States	Minnesota Wild	Michigan State University (CCHA)
13	Drew Stafford (RW)	United States	Buffalo Sabres	University of North Dakota (WCHA)
14	Devan Dubnyk (G)	Canada	Edmonton Oilers	Kamloops Blazers (WHL)
15	Alexander Radulov (RW)	Russia	Nashville Predators	THK Tver (Russia)
16	Petteri Nokelainen (C)	Finland	New York Islanders	SaiPa (Finland)
17	Marek Schwarz (G)	Czech Republic	St. Louis Blues	Sparta Prague (Czech Republic)
18	Kyle Chipchura (C)	Canada	Montreal Canadiens	Prince Albert Raiders (WHL)
19	Lauri Korpikoski (C)	Finland	New York Rangers (from Calgary)^{3}	TPS Jrs. (Finland)
20	Travis Zajac (C)	Canada	New Jersey Devils (from Dallas)^{4}	Salmon Arm Silverbacks (BCHL)
21	Wojtek Wolski (LW)	Canada	Colorado Avalanche	Brampton Battalion (OHL)
22	Lukas Kaspar (RW)	Czech Republic	San Jose Sharks (from New Jersey via Dallas)^{5}	HC Chemopetrol (Czech Republic)
23	Andrej Meszaros (D)	Slovakia	Ottawa Senators	Vancouver Giants (WHL)
24	Kris Chucko (RW)	Canada	Calgary Flames (from Toronto via New York Rangers)^{6}	Salmon Arm Silverbacks (BCHL)
25	Rob Schremp (C)	United States	Edmonton Oilers (from Philadelphia)^{7}	London Knights (OHL)
26	Cory Schneider (G)	United States	Vancouver Canucks	Phillips Academy (USHS–MA)
27	Jeff Schultz (D)	Canada	Washington Capitals (from Boston)^{8}	Calgary Hitmen (WHL)
28	Mark Fistric (D)	Canada	Dallas Stars (from San Jose)^{9}	Vancouver Giants (WHL)
29	Mike Green (D)	Canada	Washington Capitals (from Detroit)^{10}	Saskatoon Blades (WHL)
30	Andy Rogers (D)	Canada	Tampa Bay Lightning	Calgary Hitmen (WHL)

1. The Columbus Blue Jackets' first-round pick went to the Carolina Hurricanes as the result of a trade on June 26, 2004 that sent Carolina's first-round pick in 2004 (8th overall) and Toronto's second-round pick in 2004 (59th overall) to Columbus in exchange for this pick.
2. The Carolina Hurricanes' first-round pick went to the Columbus Blue Jackets as the result of a trade on June 26, 2004 that sent Columbus' first-round pick in 2004 (4th overall) to Carolina in exchange for Toronto's second-round pick in 2004 (59th overall) and this pick.
3. The Calgary Flames' first-round pick went to the New York Rangers as the result of a trade on June 25, 2004 that sent Toronto's first-round pick in 2004 (24th overall) and New York's compensatory second-round pick in 2004 (46th overall) to Calgary in exchange for Calgary's eighth-round pick in 2004 (247th overall) and this pick.
4. The Dallas Stars' first-round pick went to the New Jersey Devils as the result of a trade on June 26, 2004 that sent New Jersey's first-round pick in 2004 (22nd overall) and their third-round pick in 2004 (88th overall) to Dallas in exchange for this pick.
5. The New Jersey Devils' first-round pick went to the San Jose Sharks as the result of a trade on June 26, 2004 that sent San Jose's first-round pick in 2004 (28th overall) and San Jose's compensatory second-round and third-round picks in 2004 (52nd and 91st overall) to Dallas in exchange for Dallas' fifth-round pick in 2004 (153rd overall) and this pick.
  Dallas previously acquired this pick as the result of a trade on June 26, 2004 that sent Dallas' first-round pick in 2004 (20th overall) to New Jersey in exchange for New Jersey's third-round pick in 2004 (88th overall) and this pick.
6. The Toronto Maple Leafs' first-round pick went to the Calgary Flames as the result of a trade on June 25, 2004 that sent Calgary's first-round pick in 2004 (19th overall) and Calgary's eighth-round pick in 2004 (247th overall) to the New York Rangers in exchange for New York's compensatory second-round pick in 2004 (46th overall) and this pick.
  New York previously acquired this pick as the result of a trade on March 3, 2004 that sent Brian Leetch and future considerations (Edmonton's fourth-round pick in 2004) to Toronto in exchange for Maxim Kondratyev, Jarkko Immonen, Toronto's second-round pick in 2005 and this pick.
7. The Philadelphia Flyers' first-round pick went to the Edmonton Oilers as the result of a trade on December 16, 2003 that sent Mike Comrie to Philadelphia in exchange for Jeff Woywitka, Philadelphia's third-round pick in 2005 and this pick.
8. The Boston Bruins' first-round pick went to the Washington Capitals as the result of a trade on March 3, 2004 that sent Sergei Gonchar to Boston in exchange for Shaone Morrisonn, Boston's second-round pick in 2004 (62nd overall) and this pick.
9. The San Jose Sharks' first-round pick went to the Dallas Stars as the result of a trade on June 26, 2004 that sent New Jersey's first-round pick in 2004 (22nd overall) and Dallas' fifth-round pick in 2004 (153rd overall) to San Jose in exchange for San Jose's compensatory second-round and third-round picks in 2004 (52nd and 91st overall) and this pick.
10. The Detroit Red Wings' first-round pick went to the Washington Capitals as the result of a trade on February 27, 2004 that sent Robert Lang to Detroit in exchange for Tomas Fleischmann, Detroit's fourth-round pick in 2006 and this pick.

=== Round two ===
#	Player	Nationality	NHL team	College/junior/club team
31	Johannes Salmonsson (LW)	Sweden	Pittsburgh Penguins	Djurgardens IF (Sweden)
32	Dave Bolland (C)	Canada	Chicago Blackhawks	London Knights (OHL)
33	Chris Bourque (C)	United States	Washington Capitals	Cushing Academy (USHS–MA)
34	Johan Fransson (D)	Sweden	Dallas Stars (from Columbus)^{1}	Lulea HF (Sweden)
35	Logan Stephenson (D)	Canada	Phoenix Coyotes	Tri-City Americans (WHL)
36	Darin Olver (C)	Canada	New York Rangers	Northern Michigan University (CCHA)
37	David Shantz (G)	Canada	Florida Panthers (from Florida via Colorado and New York Rangers)^{2}	Mississauga Ice Dogs (OHL)
38	Justin Peters (G)	Canada	Carolina Hurricanes	Toronto St. Michael's Majors (OHL)
39	Jordan Smith (D)	Canada	Mighty Ducks of Anaheim	Sault Ste. Marie Greyhounds (OHL)
40	Grant Lewis (D)	United States	Atlanta Thrashers	Dartmouth College (ECAC)
41	Bryan Bickell (LW)	Canada	Chicago Blackhawks (from Los Angeles via Philadelphia)^{3}	Ottawa 67's (OHL)
42	Roman Voloshenko (LW)	Russia	Minnesota Wild	Krylya Sovetov Moscow Jr. (Russia)
43	Michael Funk (D)	Canada	Buffalo Sabres	Portland Winter Hawks (WHL)
44	Roman Teslyuk (D)	Russia	Edmonton Oilers	Kamloops Blazers (WHL)
45	Ryan Garlock (C)	Canada	Chicago Blackhawks (from Nashville)^{4}	Windsor Spitfires (OHL)
46	Adam Pineault (RW)	United States	Columbus Blue Jackets (from New York Rangers via Calgary; compensatory)^{5}	Boston College (Hockey East)
47	Blake Comeau (RW)	Canada	New York Islanders	Kelowna Rockets (WHL)
48	Dane Byers (LW)	Canada	New York Rangers (from Edmonton; compensatory)^{6}	Prince Albert Raiders (WHL)
49	Carl Soderberg (C)	Sweden	St. Louis Blues	Malmo IF (Sweden)
50	Enver Lisin (RW)	Russia	Phoenix Coyotes (from Dallas via Florida and New York Rangers; compensatory)^{7}	Kristall Saratov (Russia)
51	Bruce Graham (C)	Canada	New York Rangers (from Montreal)^{8}	Moncton Wildcats (QMJHL)
52	Raymond Sawada (RW)	Canada	Dallas Stars (from San Jose; compensatory)^{9}	Nanaimo Clippers (BCHL)
53	David Booth (LW)	United States	Florida Panthers (from Calgary)^{10}	Michigan State University (CCHA)
54	Jakub Sindel (C)	Czech Republic	Chicago Blackhawks (from Dallas)^{11}	Sparta Prague (Czech Republic)
55	Victor Oreskovich (RW)	Canada	Colorado Avalanche	Green Bay Gamblers (USHL)
56	Nicklas Grossmann (RW)	Sweden	Dallas Stars (compensatory)^{12}	Sodertalje SK Jr. (Sweden)
57	Geoff Paukovich (LW)	United States	Edmonton Oilers (from New Jersey via Phoenix)^{13}	US NTDP U18 (NAHL)
58	Kirill Lyamin (D)	Russia	Ottawa Senators	CSKA Moscow (Russia)
59	Kyle Wharton (LW)	Canada	Columbus Blue Jackets (from Toronto via Carolina)^{14}	Ottawa 67's (OHL)
60	Brandon Dubinsky (C)	United States	New York Rangers (from Philadelphia via Phoenix)^{15}	Portland Winter Hawks (WHL)
61	Alex Goligoski (D)	United States	Pittsburgh Penguins (from Vancouver)^{16}	Sioux Falls Stampede (USHL)
62	Mikhail Yunkov (C)	Russia	Washington Capitals (from Boston)^{17}	Krylja Jr. (Russia)
63	David Krejci (C)	Czech Republic	Boston Bruins (from San Jose)^{18}	HC Rabat Kladno Jr. (Czech Republic)
64	Martins Karsums (LW)	Latvia	Boston Bruins (from Detroit via Los Angeles)^{19}	Moncton Wildcats (QMJHL)
65	Mark Tobin (LW)	Canada	Tampa Bay Lightning	Rimouski Océanic (QMJHL)

1. The Columbus Blue Jackets' second-round pick went to the Dallas Stars as the result of a trade on July 22, 2003 that sent Darryl Sydor to Columbus in exchange for Mike Sillinger and this pick.
2. The Florida Panthers' second-round pick was re-acquired from the New York Rangers as the result of a trade on June 26, 2004 that sent Dallas' compensatory second-round pick in 2004 (50th overall) and Florida's third-round pick in 2004 (73rd overall) to New York in exchange for this pick.
  New York previously acquired this pick as the result of a trade on March 8, 2004 that sent Matthew Barnaby and the Rangers' third-round pick in 2004 to Colorado in exchange for Chris McAllister, David Liffiton and this pick.
  Colorado previously acquired this pick as the result of a trade on July 18, 2003 that sent Eric Messier and Vaclav Nedorost to Florida in exchange for Peter Worrell and this pick.
3. The Los Angeles Kings' second-round pick went to the Chicago Blackhawks as the result of a trade on February 19, 2004 that sent Alexei Zhamnov and Washington's fourth-round pick in 2004 to Philadelphia in exchange for Jim Vandermeer, Colin Fraser and this pick.
  Philadelphia previously acquired this pick as the result of a trade on May 28, 2003 that sent Roman Cechmanek to Los Angeles in exchange for this pick.
4. The Nashville Predators' second-round pick went to the Chicago Blackhawks as the result of a trade on February 16, 2004 that sent Steve Sullivan to Nashville in exchange for Nashville's second-round pick in 2005 and this pick.
5. The New York Rangers' compensatory second-round pick went to the Columbus Blue Jackets as the result of a trade on June 26, 2004 that sent Columbus and Tampa Bay's third-round picks in 2004 (70th and 98th overall) to Calgary in exchange for this pick.
  Calgary previously acquired this pick as the result of a trade on June 25, 2004 that sent Calgary's first and eighth-round picks in 2004 (19th and 247th overall) to New York in exchange for Toronto's first-round pick in 2004 (24th overall) and this pick.
  New York previously received the 16th pick of this round (46th overall) as compensation for not signing 2001 first-round draft pick R. J. Umberger. New York acquired the rights to Umberger from Vancouver on March 9, 2004.
6. The Edmonton Oilers' compensatory second-round pick went to the New York Rangers as the result of a trade on March 3, 2004 that sent Petr Nedved and Jussi Markkanen to Edmonton in exchange for Steve Valiquette, Dwight Helminen and this pick.
  Edmonton previously received this pick as compensation for the loss of Group III free agent Brian Leetch.
7. The Dallas Stars' compensatory second-round pick went to the Phoenix Coyotes as the result of a trade on June 26, 2004 that sent Philadelphia's second-round pick and Edmonton's third-round pick both in 2004 (60th and 80th overall) to the New York Rangers in exchange for this pick.
  New York previously acquired this pick as the result of a trade on June 26, 2004 that sent Florida's own second-round pick in 2004 (37th overall) back to the Panthers in exchange for Florida's third-round pick in 2004 (73rd overall) and this pick.
  Florida previously acquired this pick as the result of a trade on March 8, 2004 that sent Valeri Bure to Dallas in exchange for Drew Bagnall and this pick.
  Dallas previously received this pick as compensation for the loss of Group III free agent Derian Hatcher.
8. The Montreal Canadiens' second-round pick went to the New York Rangers as the result of a trade on March 2, 2004 that sent Alexei Kovalev to Montreal in exchange for Jozef Balej and this pick.
9. The San Jose Sharks' compensatory second-round pick went to the Dallas Stars as the result of a trade on June 26, 2004 that sent New Jersey's first-round pick and Dallas' fifth-round pick both in 2004 (22nd and 153rd overall) to San Jose in exchange for San Jose's first and compensatory third-round picks both in 2004 (28th and 91st overall) and this pick.
  San Jose previously received this pick as compensation for the loss of Group III free agent Teemu Selanne.
10. The Calgary Flames' second-round pick went to the Florida Panthers as the result of a trade on March 8, 2004 that sent Marcus Nilson to Calgary in exchange for this pick.
11. The Dallas Stars' second-round pick went to the Chicago Blackhawks as the result of a trade on November 17, 2003 that sent Stephane Robidas and the New York Rangers' fourth-round pick in 2004 to Dallas in exchange for Jon Klemm and this pick.
12. The Dallas Stars' received the 26th pick of this round (56th overall) as compensation for not signing 2002 first-round draft pick Martin Vagner.
13. The New Jersey Devils' second-round pick went to the Edmonton Oilers as the result of a trade on June 26, 2004 that sent Jason Chimera and Edmonton's third-round pick in 2004 (80th overall) to Phoenix in exchange for Buffalo's fourth-round pick in 2004 (112th overall) and this pick.
  Phoenix previously acquired this pick as the result of a trade on March 5, 2004 that sent Jan Hrdina to New Jersey in exchange for Michael Rupp and this pick.
14. The Toronto Maple Leafs' second-round pick went to the Columbus Blue Jackets as the result of a trade on June 26, 2004 that sent Columbus' first-round pick in 2004 (4th overall) to Carolina in exchange for Carolina's first-round pick in 2004 (8th overall) and this pick.
  Carolina previously acquired this pick as the result of a trade on March 9, 2003 that sent Glen Wesley to Toronto in exchange for this pick.
15. The Philadelphia Flyers' second-round pick went to the New York Rangers as the result of a trade on June 26, 2004 that sent Dallas' compensatory second-round pick in 2004 (50th overall) to Phoenix in exchange for Edmonton's third-round pick in 2004 (80th overall) and this pick.
  Phoenix previously acquired this pick as the result of a trade on March 10, 2003 that sent Tony Amonte to Philadelphia in exchange for Guillaume Lefebvre, Atlanta's third-round pick in 2003 and this pick.
16. The Vancouver Canucks' second-round pick went to the Pittsburgh Penguins as the result of a trade August 25, 2003 that sent Johan Hedberg to Vancouver in exchange for this pick.
17. The Boston Bruins' second-round pick went to the Washington Capitals as the result of a trade on March 3, 2004 that sent Sergei Gonchar to Boston in exchange for Shaone Morrisonn, Boston's first-round pick in 2004 and this pick.
18. The San Jose Sharks' second-round pick went to the Boston Bruins as the result of a trade on June 26, 2004 that sent Boston's third and ninth-round picks and Tampa Bay's fourth-round pick all in 2004 (94th, 129th and 288th overall) to San Jose in exchange for this pick.
19. The Detroit Red Wings' second-round pick went to the Boston Bruins as the result of a trade on June 20, 2003 that sent Jozef Stumpel and Boston's seventh-round pick in 2003 to Los Angeles in exchange for Philadelphia's fourth-round pick in 2003 and this pick.
  Los Angeles previously acquired this pick as the result of a trade on March 11, 2003 that sent Mathieu Schneider to Detroit in exchange for Sean Avery, Maxim Kuznetsov, Detroit's first-round pick in 2003 and this pick.

=== Round three ===
#	Player	Nationality	NHL team	College/junior/club team
66	Sami Lepisto (D)	Finland	Washington Capitals (compensatory)^{1}	Jokerit (Finland)
67	Nick Johnson (RW)	Canada	Pittsburgh Penguins	Dartmouth College (ECAC)
68	Adam Berti (LW)	Canada	Chicago Blackhawks	Oshawa Generals (OHL)
69	Casey Borer (D)	United States	Carolina Hurricanes (from Washington via Colorado)^{2}	St. Cloud State University (WCHA)
70	Brandon Prust (C)	Canada	Calgary Flames (from Columbus)^{3}	London Knights (OHL)
71	Andrej Sekera (D)	Slovakia	Buffalo Sabres (from Phoenix)^{4}	Dukla Trenčín Jr. (Slovakia)
72	Denis Parshin (LW)	Russia	Colorado Avalanche (from New York Rangers)^{5}	CSKA Moscow Jr. (Russia)
73	Zdenek Bahensky (RW)	Czech Republic	New York Rangers (from Florida)^{6}	HC Chemopetrol Jr. (Czech Republic)
74	Kyle Klubertanz (D)	United States	Mighty Ducks of Anaheim (from Carolina)^{7}	Green Bay Gamblers (USHL)
75	Tim Brent (C)	Canada	Mighty Ducks of Anaheim	Toronto St. Michael's Majors (OHL)
76	Scott Lehman (D)	Canada	Atlanta Thrashers	Toronto St. Michael's Majors (OHL)
77	Shawn Weller (LW)	United States	Ottawa Senators (from Los Angeles)^{8}	Capital District Selects (EJHL)
78	Peter Olvecky (LW)	Slovakia	Minnesota Wild	Dukla Trenčín Jr. (Slovakia)
79	Clayton Stoner (D)	Canada	Minnesota Wild (from Buffalo via Nashville)^{9}	Tri-City Americans (WHL)
80	Billy Ryan (C)	United States	New York Rangers (from Edmonton via Phoenix, Carolina and Phoenix)^{10}	Cushing Academy (USHS–MA)
81	Vaclav Meidl (C)	Czech Republic	Nashville Predators	Plymouth Whalers (OHL)
82	Sergei Ogorodnikov (C)	Russia	New York Islanders	THK Tver (Russia)
83	Viktor Alexandrov (RW)	Kazakhstan	St. Louis Blues	Metallurg Novokuznetsk (Russia)
84	Alexei Emelin (D)	Russia	Montreal Canadiens	CSK VVS Samara (Russia)
85	Brian Gifford (C)	United States	Pittsburgh Penguins (from Calgary)^{11}	Moorhead Senior School (USHS–MN)
86	John Lammers (LW)	Canada	Dallas Stars	Lethbridge Hurricanes (WHL)
87	Peter Regin (C)	Denmark	Ottawa Senators (from Colorado via Nashville)^{12}	Herning Bluefox (Denmark)
88	Clayton Barthel (D)	Canada	Washington Capitals (from New Jersey via Dallas)^{13}	Seattle Thunderbirds (WHL)
89	Jeff Glass (G)	Canada	Ottawa Senators	Kootenay Ice (WHL)
90	Justin Pogge (G)	Canada	Toronto Maple Leafs	Prince George Cougars (WHL)
91	Alexander Edler (D)	Sweden	Vancouver Canucks (from San Jose via Dallas; compensatory)^{14}	Jamtlands IF (Sweden)
92	Rob Bellamy (RW)	United States	Philadelphia Flyers	New England Jr. Coyotes (EJHL)
93	Dan LaCosta (G)	Canada	Columbus Blue Jackets (from Vancouver)^{15}	Owen Sound Attack (OHL)
94	Thomas Greiss (G)	Germany	San Jose Sharks (from Boston)^{16}	Kolner Haie (Germany)
95	Paul Baier (D)	United States	Los Angeles Kings (from San Jose via Montreal)^{17}	Deerfield Academy (USHS–MA)
96	Andrei Plekhanov (D)	Russia	Columbus Blue Jackets (compensatory)^{18}	Neftekhimik Nizhnekamsk Jr. (Russia)
97	Johan Franzen (C)	Sweden	Detroit Red Wings	Linkopings HC (Sweden)
98	Dustin Boyd (C)	Canada	Calgary Flames (from Tampa Bay via Columbus)^{19}	Moose Jaw Warriors (WHL)

1. The Washington Capitals compensatory third-round pick was received due to the loss of Group III free agent Calle Johansson.
2. The Washington Capitals' third-round pick went to the Carolina Hurricanes as the result of a trade on February 20, 2004 that sent Bob Boughner to Colorado in exchange for Chris Bahen, Colorado's fifth-round pick in 2005 and this pick.
  Colorado previously acquired this pick as the result of a trade on October 22, 2003 that sent Bates Battaglia and Jonas Johansson to Washington in exchange for Steve Konowalchuk and this pick.
3. The Columbus Blue Jackets' third-round pick went to the Calgary Flames as the result of a trade on June 26, 2004 that sent the New York Rangers compensatory second-round pick in 2004 (46th overall) to Columbus in exchange for Tampa Bay's third-round pick in 2004 (98th overall) and this pick.
4. The Phoenix Coyotes' third-round pick went to the Buffalo Sabres as the result of a trade on March 10, 2003 that sent Chris Gratton and Buffalo's fourth-round pick in 2004 to Phoenix in exchange for Daniel Briere and this pick.
5. The New York Rangers' third-round pick went to the Colorado Avalanche as the result of a trade on March 8, 2004 that sent Chris McAllister, David Liffiton and Florida's second-round pick in 2004 to New York in exchange for Matthew Barnaby and this pick.
6. The Florida Panthers' third-round pick went to the New York Rangers as the result of a trade on June 26, 2004 that sent the Panthers' second-round pick in 2004 (37th overall) back to Florida in exchange for Dallas' compensatory second-round pick in 2004 (50th overall) and this pick.
7. The Carolina Hurricanes' third-round pick went to the Mighty Ducks of Anaheim as the result of a trade on June 18, 2004 that sent Martin Gerber to Carolina in exchange for Tomas Malec and this pick.
8. The Los Angeles Kings' third-round pick went to the Ottawa Senators as the result of a trade on June 26, 2004 that sent Radek Bonk to Los Angeles in exchange for this pick.
9. The Buffalo Sabres' third-round pick went to the Minnesota Wild as the result of a trade on March 5, 2004 that sent Sergei Zholtok and Brad Bombardir to Nashville in exchange for Nashville's fourth-round pick in 2004 and this pick.
  Nashville previously acquired this pick as the result of a trade on June 27, 2003 that sent Andy Delmore to Buffalo in exchange for this pick.
10. The Edmonton Oilers' third-round pick went to the New York Rangers as the result of a trade on June 26, 2004 that sent Dallas' compensatory second-round pick in 2004 (50th overall) to Phoenix in exchange for Philadelphia's second-round pick in 2004 (60th overall) and this pick.
  Phoenix previously acquired this pick as the result of a trade on June 26, 2004 that sent Phoenix's third-round pick in 2005 to Carolina in exchange for this pick.
  Carolina previously acquired this pick as the result of a trade on June 21, 2003 that sent David Tanabe and Igor Knyazev to Phoenix in exchange for Danny Markov and this pick (being conditional at the time of the trade). The condition – If Phoenix acquired a 2004 third-round pick before the start of the third round, the pick would be transferred to Carolina – was converted on June 26, 2004 when Phoenix acquired a third-round pick in 2004 from Edmonton.
  Phoenix previously acquired this pick as the result of a trade on June 26, 2004 that sent New Jersey's second-round pick and Buffalo's fourth-round pick both in 2004 (57th and 112th overall) to Edmonton in exchange for Jason Chimera and this pick.
11. The Calgary Flames' third-round pick went to the Pittsburgh Penguins as the result of a trade on February 9, 2003 that sent Andrew Ference to Calgary in exchange for this pick (being conditional at the time of the trade). The condition and date of conversion are not known.
12. The Colorado Avalanche's third-round pick went to the Ottawa Senators as the result of a trade on March 9, 2004 that sent Shane Hnidy to Nashville in exchange for this pick.
  Nashville previously acquired this pick as the result of a trade on June 30, 2003 that sent Karlis Skrastins to Colorado in exchange for future considerations (that became this pick).
13. The New Jersey Devils' third-round pick went to the Washington Capitals as the result of a trade on June 26, 2004 that sent Washington's third-round pick in 2005 to Dallas in exchange for this pick.
  Dallas previously acquired this pick as the result of a trade on June 26, 2004 that sent Dallas' first-round pick in 2004 (20th overall) to New Jersey in exchange for the Devils' first-round pick in 2004 (22nd overall) and this pick.
14. The San Jose Sharks compensatory third-round pick went to the Vancouver Canucks as the result of a trade on June 26, 2004 that sent Vancouver's third-round pick in 2005 to Dallas in exchange for this pick.
  Dallas previously acquired this pick as the result of a trade on June 26, 2004 that sent New Jersey's first-round and Dallas' fifth-round picks in 2004 (22nd and 153rd overall) to San Jose in exchange for the Sharks first-round pick, compensatory second-round pick both in 2004 (28th and 52nd overall) and this pick.
  San Jose previously received this pick as compensation for the loss of Group III free agent Mark Messier.
15. The Vancouver Canucks' third-round pick went to the Columbus Blue Jackets as the result of a trade on March 9, 2004 that sent Geoff Sanderson to Vancouver in exchange for this pick.
16. The Boston Bruins' third-round pick went to the San Jose Sharks as the result of a trade on June 26, 2004 that sent San Jose's second-round pick in 2004 (63rd overall) to Boston in exchange for Tampa Bay's fourth-round pick, Boston's ninth-round pick both in 2004 (129th and 288th overall) and this pick.
17. The San Jose Sharks' third-round pick went to the Los Angeles Kings as the result of a trade on June 26, 2004 that sent Radek Bonk and Cristobal Huet to Montreal in exchange for Mathieu Garon and this pick.
  Montreal previously acquired this pick as the result of a trade on January 22, 2003 that sent Jeff Hackett to San Jose in exchange for Niklas Sundstrom and this pick.
18. The Columbus Blue Jackets compensatory third-round pick was received due to the loss of Group III free agent Ray Whitney.
19. The Tampa Bay Lightning's third-round pick went to the Calgary Flames as the result of a trade on June 26, 2004 that sent the New York Rangers compensatory second-round pick in 2004 (46th overall) to Columbus in exchange for the Blue Jackets' third-round pick in 2004 (70th overall) and this pick.
  Columbus previously acquired this pick as the result of a trade on January 27, 2004 that sent Darryl Sydor and Columbus' fourth-round pick in 2004 to Tampa Bay in exchange for Alexander Svitov and this pick.

=== Round four ===
#	Player	Nationality	NHL team	College/junior/club team
99	Tyler Kennedy (C)	Canada	Pittsburgh Penguins	Sault Ste. Marie Greyhounds (OHL)
100	J. T. Wyman (RW)	United States	Montreal Canadiens (from Chicago)^{1}	Dartmouth College (ECAC)
101	R. J. Anderson (D)	United States	Philadelphia Flyers (from Washington via Chicago)^{2}	Centennial High School (USHS–MN)
102	Mike Lundin (D)	United States	Tampa Bay Lightning (from Columbus)^{3}	University of Maine (Hockey East)
103	Roman Tomanek (RW)	Slovakia	Phoenix Coyotes	Povazka Bystrica (Slovakia)
104	Fredrik Naslund (RW)	Sweden	Dallas Stars (from New York Rangers via Chicago)^{4}	Vasteras IK (Sweden)
105	Evan Schafer (D)	Canada	Florida Panthers	Prince Albert Raiders (WHL)
106	Chad Painchaud (RW)	Canada	Atlanta Thrashers (from Carolina)^{5}	Mississauga Ice Dogs (OHL)
107	Nick Fugere (LW)	Canada	Nashville Predators (from Anaheim)^{6}	Gatineau Olympiques (QMJHL)
108	Ashton Rome (RW)	Canada	Boston Bruins (compensatory)^{7}	Moose Jaw Warriors (WHL)
109	Brett Carson (D)	Canada	Carolina Hurricanes (from Atlanta)^{8}	Calgary Hitmen (WHL)
110	Ned Lukacevic (LW)	Canada	Los Angeles Kings	Spokane Chiefs (WHL)
111	Ryan Jones (LW)	Canada	Minnesota Wild	Chatham Maroons (WOHL)
112	Liam Reddox (LW)	Canada	Edmonton Oilers (from Buffalo via Phoenix)^{9}	Peterborough Petes (OHL)
113	Roman Kukumberg (RW)	Slovakia	Toronto Maple Leafs (from Edmonton via New York Rangers)^{10}	Dukla Trenčín (Slovakia)
114	Patrick Bordeleau (LW)	Canada	Minnesota Wild (from Nashville)^{11}	Val-d'Or Foreurs (QMJHL)
115	Wes O'Neill (D)	Canada	New York Islanders	University of Notre Dame (CCHA)
116	Michal Birner (LW)	Czech Republic	St. Louis Blues	Slavia Praha (Czech Republic)
117	Julien Sprunger (RW)	Switzerland	Minnesota Wild (from Montreal)^{12}	HC Fribourg-Gotteron (Switzerland)
118	Aki Seitsonen (C)	Finland	Calgary Flames	Prince Albert Raiders (WHL)
119	Kevin Porter (C)	United States	Phoenix Coyotes (from Dallas)^{13}	US NTDP U18 (NAHL)
120	Mitch Maunu (D)	Canada	Chicago Blackhawks (from Colorado)^{14}	Windsor Spitfires (OHL)
121	Kris Hogg (LW)	Canada	Calgary Flames (from New Jersey via Columbus and Carolina)^{15}	Kamloops Blazers (WHL)
122	Alexander Nikulin (LW)	Russia	Ottawa Senators	CSKA Moscow Jr. (Russia)
123	Karel Hromas (LW)	Czech Republic	Chicago Blackhawks (from Toronto)^{16}	Sparta Prague Jr. (Czech Republic)
124	David Laliberte (RW)	Canada	Philadelphia Flyers	P.E.I. Rocket (QMJHL)
125	Andrew Sarauer (LW)	Canada	Vancouver Canucks	Langley Hornets (BCHL)
126	Torrey Mitchell (C)	Canada	San Jose Sharks (from Boston)^{17}	University of Vermont (Hockey East)
127	Ryan Callahan (RW)	United States	New York Rangers (from San Jose)^{18}	Guelph Storm (OHL)
128	Evan McGrath (C)	Canada	Detroit Red Wings	Kitchener Rangers (OHL)
129	Jason Churchill (G)	Canada	San Jose Sharks (from Tampa Bay via Boston)^{19}	Halifax Mooseheads (QMJHL)

1. The Chicago Blackhawks' fourth-round pick went to the Montreal Canadiens as the result of a trade on June 30, 2002 that sent Sergei Berezin to Chicago in exchange for this pick.
2. The Washington Capitals' fourth-round pick went to the Philadelphia Flyers as the result of a trade on February 19, 2004 that sent Jim Vandermeer, Colin Fraser and Los Angeles' second-round pick in 2004 to Chicago in exchange for Alexei Zhamnov and this pick.
  Chicago previously acquired this pick as the result of a trade on March 11, 2003 that sent Sergei Berezin to Washington in exchange for this pick.
3. The Columbus Blue Jackets' fourth-round pick went to the Tampa Bay Lightning as the result of a trade on January 27, 2004 that sent Alexander Svitov and Tampa Bay's third-round pick in 2004 to Columbus in exchange for Darryl Sydor and this pick.
4. The New York Rangers' fourth-round pick went to the Dallas Stars as the result of a trade on November 17, 2003 that sent Jon Klemm and Dallas' second-round pick in 2004 to Chicago in exchange for Stephane Robidas and this pick.
  Chicago previously acquired this pick as the result of a trade on January 8, 2003 that sent Boris Mironov to New York in exchange for this pick.
5. The Carolina Hurricanes' fourth-round pick went to the Atlanta Thrashers as the result of a trade on June 26, 2004 that sent Atlanta's third-round pick in 2005 to Carolina in exchange for this pick.
6. The Mighty Ducks of Anaheim's fourth-round pick went to the Nashville Predators as the result of a trade on June 23, 2003 that sent Chicago's fourth-round pick in 2003 to Anaheim in exchange for the Mighty Duck's fifth-round pick in 2004 and this pick.
7. The Boston Bruins compensatory fourth-round pick was received due to the loss of Group III free agent Jeff Hackett.
8. The Atlanta Thrashers' fourth-round pick went to the Carolina Hurricanes as the result of a trade on October 3, 2003 that sent Jani Hurme to Atlanta in exchange for this pick.
9. The Buffalo Sabres' fourth-round pick went to the Edmonton Oilers as the result of a trade on June 26, 2004 that sent Jason Chimera and Edmonton's third-round pick in 2004 (80th overall) to Phoenix in exchange for New Jersey's second-round pick in 2004 (57th overall) and this pick.
  Phoenix previously acquired this pick as the result of a trade on March 10, 2003 that sent Daniel Briere and Phoenix's third-round pick in 2004 to Buffalo in exchange for Chris Gratton and this pick.
10. The Edmonton Oilers' fourth-round pick went to the Toronto Maple Leafs as the result of a trade on March 3, 2004 that sent Maxim Kondratyev, Jarkko Immonen, Toronto's first-round pick in 2004 and second-round pick in 2005 to the New York Rangers in exchange for Brian Leetch and future considerations (which became this pick).
  New York previously acquired this pick as the result of a trade on June 30, 2003 that sent Brian Leetch to Edmonton in exchange for Jussi Markkanen and this pick.
11. The Nashville Predators' fourth-round pick went to the Minnesota Wild as the result of a trade on March 5, 2004 that sent Sergei Zholtok and Brad Bombardir to Nashville in exchange for Buffalo's third-round pick in 2004 and this pick.
12. The Montreal Canadiens' fourth-round pick went to the Minnesota Wild as the result of a trade on March 4, 2004 that sent Jim Dowd to Montreal in exchange for this pick.
13. The Dallas Stars' fourth-round pick went to the Phoenix Coyotes as the result of a trade on January 16, 2003 that sent Claude Lemieux to Dallas in exchange for Scott Pellerin and this pick (being conditional at the time of the trade). The condition and date of conversion are unknown.
14. The Colorado Avalanche's fourth-round pick went to the Chicago Blackhawks as the result of a trade on June 21, 2003 that sent Andrei Nikolishin to Colorado in exchange for future considerations (which became this pick).
15. The New Jersey Devils' fourth-round pick went to the Calgary Flames as the result of a trade on July 16, 2003 that sent Bob Boughner to Carolina in exchange for Carolina's fifth-round pick in 2005 and this pick.
  Carolina previously acquired this pick as the result of a trade on June 22, 2003 that sent Carolina's fifth and sixth-round picks in 2003 to Columbus in exchange for this pick.
  Columbus previously acquired this pick as the result of a trade on March 10, 2003 that sent Grant Marshall to New Jersey in exchange for this pick.
16. The Toronto Maple Leafs' fourth-round pick went to the Chicago Blackhawks as the result of a trade on March 11, 2003 that sent Phil Housley to Toronto in exchange for the Leafs' ninth-round pick in 2003 and this pick (being conditional at the time of the trade). The condition – Chicago will receive a fourth-round pick in either 2003 or 2004. The date of conversion is unknown.
17. The Boston Bruins' fourth-round pick went to the San Jose Sharks as the result of a trade on January 22, 2003 that sent Jeff Hackett and Jeff Jillson to Boston in exchange for Kyle McLaren and this pick.
18. The San Jose Sharks' fourth-round pick went to the New York Rangers as the result of a trade on June 30, 2003 that sent Mark Messier to San Jose in exchange for future considerations (which became this pick).
19. The Tampa Bay Lightning's fourth-round pick went to the San Jose Sharks as the result of a trade on June 26, 2004 that sent San Jose's second-round pick in 2004 (63rd overall) to Boston in exchange for Boston's third and ninth-round picks in 2004 (94th and 288th overall) and this pick.
  Boston previously acquired this pick as the result of a trade on January 13, 2003 that sent John Grahame to Tampa Bay in exchange for this pick.

=== Round five ===
#	Player	Nationality	NHL team	College/junior/club team
130	Michal Sersen (D)	Slovakia	Pittsburgh Penguins	Rimouski Océanic (QMJHL)
131	Trevor Kell (RW)	Canada	Chicago Blackhawks	London Knights (OHL)
132	Oscar Hedman (D)	Sweden	Washington Capitals	Modo Hockey (Sweden)
133	Petr Pohl (RW)	Czech Republic	Columbus Blue Jackets	Gatineau Olympiques (QMJHL)
134	Kris Versteeg (RW)	Canada	Boston Bruins (from Phoenix)^{1}	Lethbridge Hurricanes (WHL)
135	Roman Psurny (LW)	Czech Republic	New York Rangers	HC Hame Jr. (Czech Republic)
136	Nikita Nikitin (D)	Russia	St. Louis Blues (from Florida)^{2}	Avangard Omsk Jr. (Russia)
137	Magnus Akerlund (G)	Sweden	Carolina Hurricanes	HV71 Jr. (Sweden)
138	Pasi Salonen (LW)	Finland	Washington Capitals (compensatory)^{3}	HIFK Jr. (Finland)
139	Kyle Moir (G)	Canada	Nashville Predators (from Anaheim)^{4}	Swift Current Broncos (WHL)
140	Jake Dowell (C)	United States	Chicago Blackhawks (compensatory)^{5}	University of Wisconsin–Madison (WCHA)
141	Jim McKenzie (RW)	United States	Ottawa Senators (compensatory)^{6}	Sioux Falls Stampede (USHL)
142	Juraj Gracik (RW)	Slovakia	Atlanta Thrashers	HC Topolcany (Slovakia)
143	Eric Neilson (RW)	Canada	Los Angeles Kings	Rimouski Océanic (QMJHL)
144	Chris Zarb (D)	United States	Philadelphia Flyers (from Minnesota)^{7}	Tri-City Storm (USHL)
145	Michal Valent (G)	Slovakia	Buffalo Sabres	MHC Martin Jr. (Slovakia)
146	Bryan Young (D)	Canada	Edmonton Oilers	Peterborough Petes (OHL)
147	Janne Niskala (D)	Finland	Nashville Predators	Lukko (Finland)
148	Steve Regier (LW)	Canada	New York Islanders	Medicine Hat Tigers (WHL)
149	Gino Pisellini (RW)	United States	Philadelphia Flyers (from St. Louis)^{8}	Plymouth Whalers (OHL)
150	Mikhail Grabovski (C)	Belarus	Montreal Canadiens	Neftekhimik Nizhnekamsk (Russia)
151	Sergei Kolosov (RW)	Belarus	Detroit Red Wings (compensatory)^{9}	Minsk (D)
152	Bret Nasby (D)	Canada	Florida Panthers (from Calgary via San Jose)^{10}	Oshawa Generals (OHL)
153	Steven Zalewski (C)	United States	San Jose Sharks (from Dallas)^{11}	Northwood Prep (USHS–NY)
154	Richard Demen-Willaume (D)	Sweden	Colorado Avalanche	Frolunda HC Jr. (Sweden)
155	Alexander Mikhailishin (D)	Russia	New Jersey Devils	Spartak Moscow 2 (Russia)
156	Roman Wick (RW)	Switzerland	Ottawa Senators	Kloten Flyers (Switzerland)
157	Dmitry Vorobyov (D)	Russia	Toronto Maple Leafs	Lada Togliatti (Russia)
158	Brandon Elliott (D)	Canada	Tampa Bay Lightning (from Philadelphia)^{12}	Mississauga IceDogs (OHL)
159	Mike Brown (RW)	United States	Vancouver Canucks	University of Michigan (CCHA)
160	Ben Walter (C)	Canada	Boston Bruins	University of Massachusetts Lowell (Hockey East)
161	Jean-Claude Sawyer (D)	Canada	Minnesota Wild (from San Jose)^{13}	Cape Breton Screaming Eagles (QMJHL)
162	Tyler Haskins (C)	United States	Detroit Red Wings	Toronto St. Michael's Majors (OHL)
163	Dustin Collins (RW)	United States	Tampa Bay Lightning	Northern Michigan University (CCHA)

1. The Phoenix Coyotes' fifth-round pick went to the Boston Bruins as the result of a trade on May 31, 2003 that sent Darren McLachlan to Phoenix in exchange for this pick.
2. The Florida Panthers' fifth-round pick went to the St. Louis Blues as the result of a trade on March 11, 2003 that sent Mike Van Ryn to Florida in exchange for Valeri Bure and this pick (being conditional at the time of the trade). The condition and date of conversion are unknown.
3. The Washington Capitals compensatory fifth-round pick was received due to the loss of Group III free agent Ken Klee.
4. The Mighty Ducks of Anaheim's fifth-round pick went to the Nashville Predators as the result of a trade on June 23, 2003 that sent Chicago's fourth-round pick in 2003 to Anaheim in exchange for Anaheim's fourth-round pick in 2004 and this pick.
5. The Chicago Blackhawks compensatory fifth-round pick was received due to the loss of Group III free agent Chris Simon.
6. The Ottawa Senators compensatory fifth-round pick was received due to the loss of Group III free agent Magnus Arvedson.
7. The Minnesota Wild's fifth-round pick went to the Philadelphia Flyers as the result of a trade on December 17, 2003 that sent Eric Chouinard to Minnesota in exchange for this pick.
8. The St. Louis Blues' fifth-round pick went to the Philadelphia Flyers as the result of trade on February 9, 2004 that sent Eric Weinrich to St. Louis in exchange for this pick.
9. The Detroit Red Wings compensatory fifth-round pick was received due to the loss of Group III free agent Luc Robitaille.
10. The Calgary Flames' fifth-round pick went to the Florida Panthers as the result of a trade on June 27, 2004 that sent Florida's seventh and eighth-round picks both in 2004 (201st and 234th overall) to San Jose in exchange for this pick.
  San Jose previously acquired this pick as the result of a trade on January 9, 2004 that sent Lynn Loyns to Calgary in exchange for this pick.
11. The Dallas Stars' fifth-round pick went to the San Jose Sharks as the result of trade on June 26, 2004 that sent San Jose's first-round pick and their compensatory second and third-round picks, all in 2004 (28th, 52nd and 91st overall) to Dallas in exchange for the Stars first-round pick in 2004 (22nd overall) and this pick.
12. The Philadelphia Flyers' fifth-round pick went to the Tampa Bay Lightning as the result of a trade on June 27, 2004 that sent Tampa Bay's third-round pick in 2005 to Philadelphia in exchange for Philadelphia and San Jose's sixth-round picks both in 2004 (188th and 191st overall) and this pick.
13. The San Jose Sharks' fifth-round pick went to the Minnesota Wild as the result of a trade on March 3, 2004 that sent Jason Marshall to San Jose in exchange for this pick.

=== Round six ===
#	Player	Nationality	NHL team	College/junior/club team
164	Moises Gutierrez (RW)	United States	Pittsburgh Penguins	Kamloops Blazers (WHL)
165	Scott McCulloch (LW)	Canada	Chicago Blackhawks	Grande Prairie Storm (AJHL)
166	Peter Guggisberg (RW)	Switzerland	Washington Capitals	HC Davos (Switzerland)
167	Robert Page (D)	United States	Columbus Blue Jackets	Blake High School (USHS-MN)
168	Kevin Cormier (C)	Canada	Phoenix Coyotes	Moncton Wildcats (QMJHL)
169	Jordan Foote (LW)	Canada	New York Rangers	Nanaimo Clippers (BCHL)
170	Ladislav Scurko (C)	Slovakia	Philadelphia Flyers (from Florida)^{1}	Spisska Nova Ves Jr. (Slovakia)
171	Frederik Cabana (C)	Canada	Philadelphia Flyers (from Carolina)^{2}	Halifax Mooseheads (QMJHL)
172	Matt Auffrey (RW)	United States	Mighty Ducks of Anaheim	US NTDP (NAHL)
173	Adam Pardy (D)	Canada	Calgary Flames (from Atlanta)^{3}	Cape Breton Screaming Eagles (QMJHL)
174	Scott Parse (LW)	United States	Los Angeles Kings	University of Nebraska Omaha (CCHA)
175	Aaron Boogaard (RW)	Canada	Minnesota Wild	Tri-Cities Americans (WHL)
176	Patrick Kaleta (RW)	United States	Buffalo Sabres	Peterborough Petes (OHL)
177	Max Gordichuk (D)	Canada	Edmonton Oilers	Kamloops Blazers (WHL)
178	Mike Santorelli (RW)	Canada	Nashville Predators	Vernon Vipers (BCHL)
179	Jaroslav Mrazek (LW)	Czech Republic	New York Islanders	Sparta Prague Jr. (Czech Republic)
180	Roman Polak (D)	Czech Republic	St. Louis Blues	HC Vitkovice Jr. (Czech Republic)
181	Loic Lacasse (G)	Canada	Montreal Canadiens	Baie-Comeau Drakkar (QMJHL)
182	Fred Wikner (RW)	Sweden	Calgary Flames	Frolunda HC Jr. (Sweden)
183	Trevor Ludwig (D)	United States	Dallas Stars	Texas Tornado (NAHL)
184	Derek Peltier (D)	United States	Colorado Avalanche	Cedar Rapids RoughRiders (USHL)
185	Josh Disher (G)	Canada	New Jersey Devils (from New Jersey via Atlanta)^{4}	Erie Otters (OHL)
186	Dan Turple (G)	Canada	Atlanta Thrashers (from Ottawa)^{5}	Oshawa Generals (OHL)
187	Robbie Earl (LW)	United States	Toronto Maple Leafs	University of Wisconsin (WCHA)
188	Jan Zapletal (D)	Czech Republic	Tampa Bay Lightning (from Philadelphia)^{6}	HC Vsetin Jr. (Czech Republic)
189	Julien Ellis (G)	Canada	Vancouver Canucks	Shawinigan Cataractes (QMJHL)
190	Lennart Petrell (C)	Finland	Columbus Blue Jackets (from Boston)^{7}	HIFK Jr. (Finland)
191	Karri Ramo (G)	Finland	Tampa Bay Lightning (from San Jose via Philadelphia)^{8}	Pelicans Jr. (Finland)
192	Anton Axelsson (LW)	Sweden	Detroit Red Wings	Frolunda HC Jr. (Sweden)
193	Kevin Schaeffer (D)	United States	Nashville Predators (from Tampa Bay)^{9}	Boston University (Hockey East)

1. The Florida Panthers' sixth-round pick went to the Philadelphia Flyers as the result of a trade on June 22, 2003 that sent Philadelphia's seventh-round pick in 2003 to Florida in exchange for this pick.
2. The Carolina Hurricanes' sixth-round pick went to the Philadelphia Flyers as the result of a trade on June 21, 2003 that sent Marty Murray to Carolina in exchange for this pick.
3. The Atlanta Thrashers' sixth-round pick went to the Calgary Flames as the result of a trade on December 18, 2001 that sent Jeff Cowan and Kurtis Foster to Atlanta in exchange for Petr Buzek and this pick.
4. The New Jersey Devils' sixth-round pick was re-acquired as the result of a trade on March 10, 2003 that sent New Jersey's fourth-round pick in 2003 to Atlanta in exchange for Richard Smehlik, New Jersey's eighth-round pick in 2004 and this pick.
  Atlanta previously acquired this pick as the result of a trade on February 24, 2003 that sent Pascal Rheaume to New Jersey in exchange for future considerations (which became this pick).

=== Round seven ===
#	Player	Nationality	NHL team	College/junior/club team
194	Chris Peluso (D)	United States	Pittsburgh Penguins	Brainerd High School (USHS-MN)
195	Jean-Michel Rizk (RW)	Canada	Minnesota Wild (compensatory)^{1}	Saginaw Spirit (OHL)
196	Petri Kontiola (C)	Finland	Chicago Blackhawks	Tappara (Finland)
197	Andrew Gordon (RW)	Canada	Washington Capitals	Notre Dame Hounds (SJHL)
198	Justin Vienneau (D)	Canada	Columbus Blue Jackets	Shawinigan Cataractes (QMJHL)
199	Chad Kolarik (C)	United States	Phoenix Coyotes	US NTDP (NAHL)
200	Matt Schneider (C)	Canada	Calgary Flames (from New York Rangers)^{2}	Tri-Cities Americans (WHL)
201	Michael Vernace (D)	Canada	San Jose Sharks (from Florida)^{3}	Brampton Battalion (OHL)
202	Ryan Pottruff (D)	Canada	Carolina Hurricanes	London Knights (OHL)
203	Gabriel Bouthillette (G)	Canada	Mighty Ducks of Anaheim	Gatineau Olympiques (QMJHL)
204	Miikka Tuomainen (LW)	Finland	Atlanta Thrashers	TuTo (Finland)
205	Mike Curry (RW)	United States	Los Angeles Kings	Sioux City Stampede (USHL)
206	Anton Khudobin (G)	Russia	Minnesota Wild	Metallurg Magnitogorsk Jr. (Russia)
207	Mark Mancari (RW)	Canada	Buffalo Sabres	Ottawa 67's (OHL)
208	Stephane Goulet (RW)	Canada	Edmonton Oilers	Quebec Ramparts (QMJHL)
209	Stanislav Balan (C)	Czech Republic	Nashville Predators	Zlin Jr. (Czech Republic)
210	Emil Axelsson (D)	Sweden	New York Islanders	Orebro HK (Sweden)
211	David Fredriksson (LW)	Sweden	St. Louis Blues	HV71 Jr. (Sweden)
212	Jon Gleed (LW)	Canada	Montreal Canadiens	Cornell University (ECAC)
213	James Spratt (G)	United States	Calgary Flames	Sioux City Stampede (USHL)
214	Troy Brouwer (LW)	Canada	Chicago Blackhawks (from Dallas)^{4}	Moose Jaw Warriors (WHL)
215	Ian Keserich (G)	United States	Colorado Avalanche	Cleveland Jr. Barons (NAHL)
216	Pierre-Luc Letourneau-Leblond (LW)	Canada	New Jersey Devils (compensatory)^{5}	Baie-Comeau Drakkar (QMJHL)
217	Tyler Eckford (D)	Canada	New Jersey Devils	South Surrey Eagles (BCHL)
218	Sergei Kukushkin (RW)	Belarus	Dallas Stars (compensatory)^{6}	Junost Minsk (Belarus)
219	Joe Cooper (RW)	Canada	Ottawa Senators	Miami University (CCHA)
220	Maxim Semyonov (D)	Kazakhstan	Toronto Maple Leafs	Lada Togliatti (Russia)
221	Daniel Taylor (G)	Canada	Los Angeles Kings (from Philadelphia)^{7}	Guelph Storm (OHL)
222	Jordan Morrison (D)	Canada	Pittsburgh Penguins (from Vancouver)^{8}	Peterborough Petes (OHL)
223	Jared Walker (LW)	Canada	Chicago Blackhawks (compensatory)^{9}	Red Deer Rebels (WHL)
224	Matt Hunwick (D)	United States	Boston Bruins	University of Michigan (CCHA)
225	David MacDonald (D)	Canada	San Jose Sharks	New England Jr. Huskies (EJHL)
226	Steven Covington (RW)	Canada	Detroit Red Wings	Calgary Hitmen (WHL)
227	Chris Campoli (D)	Canada	New York Islanders (from Tampa Bay via Philadelphia)^{10}	Erie Otters (OHL)

=== Round eight ===
#	Player	Nationality	NHL team	College/junior/club team
228	David Brown (G)	Canada	Pittsburgh Penguins	University of Notre Dame (CCHA)
229	Eric Hunter (C)	Canada	Chicago Blackhawks	Prince George Cougars (WHL)
230	Justin Mrazek (G)	Canada	Washington Capitals	Estevan Bruins (SJHL)
231	Brian McGuirk (LW)	United States	Columbus Blue Jackets	Governmer Drummer Academy (USHS-MA)
232	Martin Houle (G)	Canada	Philadelphia Flyers (from Phoenix via Dallas)^{1}	Cape Breton Screaming Eagles (QMJHL)
233	Matt Greer (LW)	United States	Columbus Blue Jackets (from New York Rangers)^{2}	White Bear High School (USHS-MN)
234	Derek MacIntyre (G)	United States	San Jose Sharks (from Florida)^{3}	Soo Indians (NAHL)
235	Jonas Fiedler (RW)	Czech Republic	Carolina Hurricanes	Plymouth Whalers (OHL)
236	Matt Christie (C)	Canada	Mighty Ducks of Anaheim	Miami University (CCHA)
237	Mitch Carefoot (C)	Canada	Atlanta Thrashers	Cornell University (ECAC)
238	Yutaka Fukufuji (G)	Japan	Los Angeles Kings	Bakersfield Condors (ECHL)
239	Brandon Yip (RW)	Canada	Colorado Avalanche (from Minnesota)^{4}	Coquitlam Express (BCHL)
240	Aaron Gagnon (C)	Canada	Phoenix Coyotes (compensatory)^{5}	Seattle Thunderbirds (WHL)
241	Mike Card (D)	Canada	Buffalo Sabres	Kelowna Rockets (WHL)
242	Tyler Spurgeon (C)	Canada	Edmonton Oilers	Kelowna Rockets (WHL)
243	Denis Kulyash (D)	Russia	Nashville Predators	CSKA Moscow (Russia)
244	Jason Pitton (LW)	Canada	New York Islanders	Sault Ste. Marie Greyhounds (OHL)
245	Justin Keller (LW)	Canada	Tampa Bay Lightning (from St. Louis)^{6}	Kelowna Rockets (WHL)
246	Gregory Stewart (RW)	Canada	Montreal Canadiens	Peterborough Petes (OHL)
247	Jonathan Paiement (D)	Canada	New York Rangers (from Calgary)^{7}	Lewiston Maineiacs (QMJHL)
248	Lukas Vomela (D)	Czech Republic	Dallas Stars	HC Ceske Budejovice (Czech Republic)
249	J. D. Corbin (LW)	United States	Colorado Avalanche	University of Denver (WCHA)
250	Nathan Perkovich (RW)	United States	New Jersey Devils (from New Jersey via Atlanta)^{8}	Cedar Rapids RoughRiders (USHL)
251	Matt McIlvane (C)	United States	Ottawa Senators	Chicago Steel (USHL)
252	Jan Steber (C)	Czech Republic	Toronto Maple Leafs	Halifax Mooseheads (QMJHL)
253	Travis Gawryletz (D)	Canada	Philadelphia Flyers	Trail Smoke Eaters (BCHL)
254	David Schulz (D)	Canada	Vancouver Canucks	Swift Current Broncos (WHL)
255	Anton Hedman (LW)	Sweden	Boston Bruins	Stocksund (Sweden)
256	Matthew Ford (RW)	United States	Chicago Blackhawks (from San Jose)^{9}	Sioux Falls Stampede (USHL)
257	Gennady Stolyarov (RW)	Russia	Detroit Red Wings	THK Tver (Russia)
258	Pekka Rinne (G)	Finland	Nashville Predators (from Tampa Bay)^{10}	Karpat (Finland)

=== Round nine ===
#	Player	Nationality	NHL team	College/junior/club team
259	Brian Ihnacak (C)	Canada	Pittsburgh Penguins	Brown University (ECAC)
260	Marko Anttila (RW)	Finland	Chicago Blackhawks	Leki Lempaala (Finland)
261	William Engasser (LW)	United States	Phoenix Coyotes (compensatory)^{1}	Blake High School (USHS-MN)
262	Mark Streit (D)	Switzerland	Montreal Canadiens (compensatory)^{2}	HC Zurich (Switzerland)
263	Travis Morin (C)	United States	Washington Capitals (from Washington via Ottawa)^{3}	Minnesota State University (WCHA)
264	Valtteri Tenkanen (C)	Finland	Los Angeles Kings (from Columbus)^{4}	JYP (Finland)
265	Daniel Winnik (C)	Canada	Phoenix Coyotes	University of New Hampshire (Hockey East)
266	Jakub Petruzalek (RW)	Czech Republic	New York Rangers	HC Chemopetrol (Czech Republic)
267	Spencer Dillon (D)	United States	Florida Panthers	Salmon Arm Silverbacks (BCHL)
268	Martin Vagner (D)	Czech Republic	Carolina Hurricanes	Gatineau Olympiques (QMJHL)
269	Janne Pesonen (RW)	Finland	Mighty Ducks of Anaheim	Karpat (Finland)
270	Matthew Siddall (RW)	Canada	Atlanta Thrashers	Powell River Kings (BCHL)
271	Grant Clitsome (D)	Canada	Columbus Blue Jackets (from Los Angeles)^{5}	Nepean Raiders (CCHL)
272	Kyle Wilson (C)	Canada	Minnesota Wild	Colgate University (ECAC)
273	Dylan Hunter (LW)	Canada	Buffalo Sabres	London Knights (OHL)
274	Bjorn Bjurling (G)	Sweden	Edmonton Oilers	Djurgardens IF (Sweden)
275	Craig Switzer (D)	Canada	Nashville Predators	Salmon Arm Silverbacks (BCHL)
276	Sylvain Michaud (G)	Canada	New York Islanders	Drummondville Voltigeurs (QMJHL)
277	Jonathan Boutin (RW)	Canada	St. Louis Blues	Shawinigan Cataractes (QMJHL)
278	Alexandre Dulac-Lemelin (D)	Canada	Montreal Canadiens	Baie-Comeau Drakkar (QMJHL)
279	Adam Cracknell (RW)	Canada	Calgary Flames	Kootenay Ice (WHL)
280	Matt McKnight (C)	Canada	Dallas Stars	Camrose Kodiaks (AJHL)
281	Stephen McClellan (D)	United States	Colorado Avalanche	Catholic Memorial High School (USHS–MA)
282	Valeri Klimov (D)	Russia	New Jersey Devils	Spartak Moscow Jr. (Russia)
283	Luke Beaverson (D)	United States	Florida Panthers (from Ottawa)^{6}	Green Bay Gamblers (USHL)
284	John Wikner (LW)	Sweden	Ottawa Senators (compensatory)^{7}	Frolunda HC Jr. (Sweden)
285	Pierce Norton (RW)	United States	Toronto Maple Leafs	Thayer Academy (USHS-MA)
286	Triston Grant (LW)	Canada	Philadelphia Flyers	Vancouver Giants (WHL)
287	Jannik Hansen (RW)	Denmark	Vancouver Canucks	Rodovre Mighty Bulls (Denmark)
288	Brian Mahoney-Wilson (G)	United States	San Jose Sharks (from Boston via New York Rangers and Boston)^{8}	Catholic Memorial High School (USHS-MA)
289	Christian Jensen (D)	United States	San Jose Sharks	New Jersey Jr. Devils (NJHL)
290	Nils Backstrom (D)	Sweden	Detroit Red Wings	Stocksund (Sweden)
291	John Carter (C)	United States	Philadelphia Flyers (from Tampa Bay)^{9}	Brewster Bulldogs (EMJHL)

== Draftees based on nationality ==
Rank	Country	Picks	Percent	Top selection
	North America	193	66.3%	
1	Canada	129	44.3%	Cam Barker, 3rd
2	United States	64	22.0%	Blake Wheeler, 5th
	Europe	98	33.7%	
3	Czech Republic	21	7.2%	Rostislav Olesz, 7th
4	Russia	20	6.9%	Alexander Ovechkin, 1st
5	Sweden	18	6.2%	Johannes Salmonsson, 31st
6	Finland	15	5.2%	Lauri Tukonen, 11th
7	Slovakia	10	3.4%	Boris Valabik, 10th
8	Switzerland	4	1.4%	Julien Sprunger, 117th
9	Belarus	3	1.0%	Mikhail Grabovski, 150th
10	Denmark	2	0.7%	Peter Regin, 87th
11	Latvia	1	0.3%	Martins Karsums, 64th
11	Germany	1	0.3%	Thomas Greiss, 94th
	Asia	3	1.0%	
10	Kazakhstan	2	0.7%	Viktor Alexandrov, 83rd
11	Japan	1	0.3%	Yutaka Fukufuji, 238th

== See also ==
- 2004–05 NHL season
- 2003 NHL entry draft
- 2005 NHL entry draft
- List of NHL first overall draft choices
- List of NHL players
