= Matt McIlvane =

American ice hockey coach

- Born: November 2, 1985 (age 40) Naperville, Illinois, U.S.
- Height: 6 ft 0 in (183 cm)
- Weight: 203 lb (92 kg; 14 st 7 lb)
- Position: Center
- Shot: Right
- Played for: Eisbären Berlin; Binghamton Senators; Peoria Rivermen
- NHL draft: 251st overall, 2004; Ottawa Senators
- Playing career: 2008–2011
- Coaching career: 2011–present

Matthew McIlvane (born November 2, 1985) is an American professional ice hockey coach and former player who is currently an assistant coach for the Boston Bruins of the National Hockey League (NHL).

McIlvane was selected in the 8th round of the 2004 NHL entry draft by the Ottawa Senators, and played professionally for four years before retiring due to injury. He has served as the head coach for EC Salzburg of the ICE Hockey League (ICEHL) and San Diego Gulls of the American Hockey League (AHL). He was an assistant coach for the German national ice hockey team at the 2018 Winter Olympics, where he helped the team to a silver medal.

== Playing career ==
=== Amateur ===
An Illinois native, McIlvane played for the Chicago Freeze of the North American Hockey League (NAHL) and the Chicago Steel of the United States Hockey League (USHL) for parts of three seasons, scoring twenty goal seasons in his final two seasons before he announced his commitment to play college ice hockey for Ohio State starting in the 2004-05 season.

McIlvane would play four years for Ohio State, helping the team to at at-large bid in his freshman season, and was named an alternate captain for his junior season. Prior to his senior season in 2007–08, McIlvane was named captain of the team.

=== Professional ===
McIlvane was drafted in the eighth round, 251st overall, by the Ottawa Senators in the 2004 NHL entry draft.

After his collegiate career concluded, McIlvane signed an amateur try-out (ATO) contract with the Senators American Hockey League (AHL) affiliate, the Binghamton Senators. McIlvane would appear in four games for the remainder of the 2007–08 season for the Senators, scoring a single assist.

After the season, McIlvane opted to continue his professional hockey career in Europe, signing with Eisbären Berlin of the Deutsche Eishockey Liga (DEL). McIlvane would sit out the beginning of the season while recovering from an elbow injury. Unfortunately for McIlvane, he would only play 14 games with Berlin after returning before his season was cut short after sustaining an injury during a game.

McIlvane would move back to the U.S. after the season, signing with the Bloomington PrairieThunder of the United Hockey League (UHL). He scored 11 goals and 13 assists in 62 games with the PrairieThunder before signing a professional tryout (PTO) contract with the Peoria Rivermen, returning to the AHL. He scored a goal and three assists with the Rivermen in eight games to conclude the season.

McIlvane signed with the Rivermen to start the 2010–11 season, but would start his season playing with the PraireThunder, who had joined the Central Hockey League (CHL). After scoring five points in his first seven games with the PraireThunder, McIlvane was recalled to the Rivermen. He would play three games with the Rivermen, notching a goal and an assists, before being sent back down to the PraireThunder, although he would not appear with them due to injury.

McIlvane would sign with the ECHL's Cincinnati Cyclones for the 2011-12 season. However, McIlvane would only appear in two games with the Cyclones before suffering from another injury. After the injury, McIlvane retired from professional hockey.

== Coaching career ==
=== Early career ===
McIlvane's head coaching career started soon after he retired, at the age of 26, when he was hired by the Danville Dashers of the Federal Prospects Hockey League (FPHL) in December 2011. He was the team's third head coach of the season, after the first coach was fired due to a poor start, and the second had to step away due to injury. At the time of McIlvane taken over, the Dashers had played 26 games and won none. However, on January 1, 2012, the Dashers faced the defending champions and won 15-1, signaling a turnaround.

After the season with the Dashers, McIlvane was named an assistant coach of the Orlando Solar Bears.

=== Europe ===
After one season with the Solar Bears, McIlvane decided to make the jump to Europe again, this time for his coaching career. He spent the 2013-14 season as an assistant coach with EC Salzburg of the ICE Hockey League (ICEHL). With Salzburg, McIlvane won the league title.

After a year with Salzberg, McIlvane was hired as an assistant coach with EHC Munchen with the Deutsche Eishockey Liga (DEL). In five years with Munchen, McIlvane won the league title three times. Because of his success of an assistant coach at Munchen, he was selected by head coach Marco Sturm to be an assistant for him for the German national team at the 2018 Winter Olympics. McIlvane won a silver medal with the team at the Olympics.

After five years with Munchen, McIlvane returned to Salzburg, this time as their head coach. At the time of the hiring, McIlvane was the youngest head coach in team history, at 33. McIlvane spent four years at the helm at Salzburg, leading them to the league title in his final two years. In 2021, McIlvane was named an assistant coach for Germany at the 2021 World Championship, where they finished in fourth.

=== San Diego Gulls ===
On April 23, 2023, McIlvane was announced as the head coach of the San Diego Gulls of the American Hockey League (AHL), returning to the U.S. after ten seasons coaching abroad.

McIlvane's Gulls would not make the Calder Cup playoffs his first two seasons, although there was steady improvement for the team from before his arrival. In McIlvane's third season coaching the team, they managed to make the playoffs, finishing 7th in the Pacific Division. Their 33 wins were the Gulls most wins in a season since the 2018–19 season. However, they would lose in the opening round in two games to the Colorado Eagles.

On April 15, 2026, the Gulls announced that they had agreed to a multi-year extension with McIlvane to stay as the head coach.

=== Boston Bruins ===
On June 11, 2026, McIlvane was announced as an assistant coach of the Boston Bruins of the National Hockey League (NHL). The move reunited him with head coach Marco Sturm, who he coached with on the German national team in the 2018 Winter Olympics.

== Career statistics ==
			Regular season					Playoffs
Season	Team	League	GP	G	A	Pts	PIM	GP	G	A	Pts	PIM
2001-02	Chicago Freeze	NAHL	2	0	2	2	0	—	—	—	—	—
2002-03	Chicago Freeze	NAHL	53	23	33	56	89	—	—	—	—	—
2003–04	Chicago Steel	USHL	59	22	24	46	53	3	1	2	3	0
2004–05	Ohio State University	CCHA	42	1	5	6	30	—	—	—	—	—
2005–06	Ohio State University	CCHA	37	3	10	13	45	—	—	—	—	—
2006-07	Ohio State University	CCHA	36	6	11	17	18	—	—	—	—	—
2007–08	Ohio State University	CCHA	41	5	11	16	24	—	—	—	—	—
2007–08	Binghamton Senators	AHL	4	0	1	1	0	—	—	—	—	—
2008–09	Eisbären Berlin	DEL	14	1	3	4	31	—	—	—	—	—
2009-10	Bloomington PrairieThunder	UHL	62	11	13	24	43	—	—	—	—	—
2009-10	Peoria Rivermen	AHL	8	1	2	3	2	—	—	—	—	—
2010-11	Bloomington PraireThunder	CHL	7	3	2	5	8	—	—	—	—	—
2010–11	Peoria Riverman	AHL	3	1	1	2	4	—	—	—	—	—
2011–12	Cincinnati Cyclones	ECHL	2	0	0	0	4	—	—	—	—	—
AHL totals			15	2	4	6	6	—	—	—	—	—
DEL totals			14	1	3	4	32	—	—	—	—	—

== Head coaching record ==
=== AHL ===
Team	Year	Regular season								Postseason		
Team	Year	G	W	L	OTL	SOL	Pts	Finish	W	L	Win%	Result
SDG	2023-24	72	26	35	10	1	63	9th in Pacific	—	—	—	Missed playoffs
SDG	2024-25	72	29	35	5	3	66	9th in Pacific	—	—	—	Missed Playoffs
SDG	2025-26	72	33	27	8	4	78	7th in Pacific	0	2	.000	Lost in Round 1
AHL total		216	88	97	23	8			0	2	.000	1 playoff appearance

== Awards and accomplishments ==
=== As a coach ===
- Deutsche Eishockey Liga Champion: 2015–16, 2016–17, 2017–18
- (silver) Winter Olympics: 2018
- ICE Hockey League Champion: 2021–22, 2022–23
