= Miikka Tuomainen =

Finnish ice hockey player

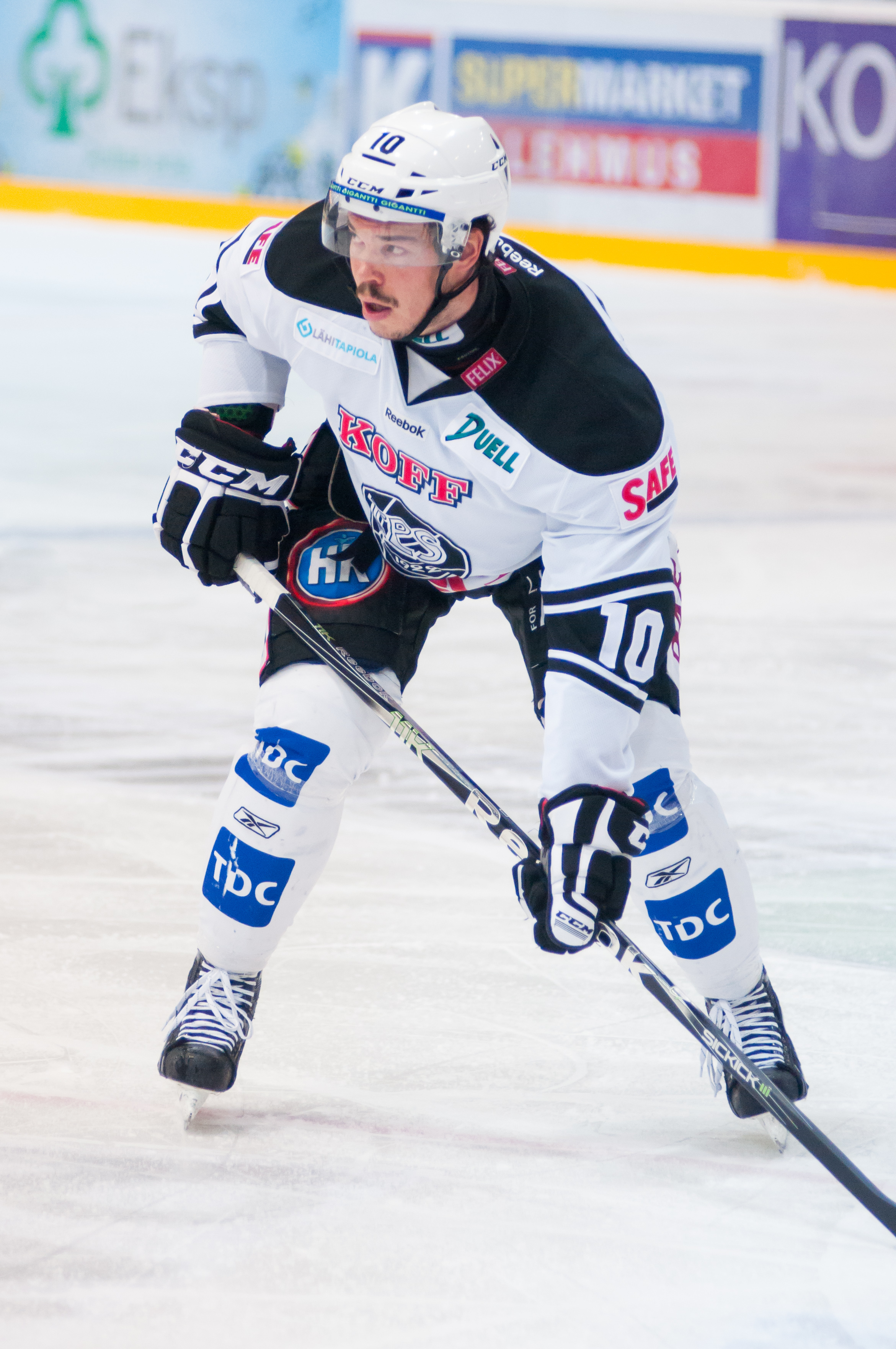
- Born: May 22, 1986 (age 39) Turku, Finland
- Height: 6 ft 3 in (191 cm)
- Weight: 236 lb (107 kg; 16 st 12 lb)
- Position: Right wing
- Shot: Left
- Played for: TUTO Hockey; Lukko; HIFK; Kiekko-Vantaa; TPS; EHC Klostersee
- NHL draft: 204th overall, 2004; Atlanta Thrashers
- Playing career: 2003–2016

Miikka Tuomainen (born May 22, 1986) is a Finnish former professional ice hockey forward.

Tuomainen played in the SM-liiga in Finland for Lukko, HIFK and HC TPS. He was drafted 204th by the Atlanta Thrashers in the 2004 NHL entry draft.

== Career statistics ==
=== Regular season and playoffs ===
			Regular season					Playoffs
Season	Team	League	GP	G	A	Pts	PIM	GP	G	A	Pts	PIM
2000–01	TuTo Hockey	FIN U16	4	1	0	1	2	3	0	0	0	2
2001–02	TuTo Hockey	FIN.2 U18	14	8	5	13	14	7	2	2	4	8
2001–02	TuTo Hockey	FIN U20	1	1	0	1	0	—	—	—	—	—
2002–03	TuTo Hockey	FIN U18	24	3	4	7	52	4	0	0	0	0
2002–03	TuTo Hockey	FIN.2 U20	2	0	0	0	4	—	—	—	—	—
2002–03	TuTo Hockey	Mestis	6	0	0	0	0	—	—	—	—	—
2003–04	TuTo Hockey	FIN U18	16	7	6	13	4	—	—	—	—	—
2003–04	TuTo Hockey	Mestis	25	4	3	7	2	—	—	—	—	—
2004–05	TuTo Hockey	FIN.2 U20	5	1	4	5	0	—	—	—	—	—
2004–05	TuTo Hockey	Mestis	42	4	4	8	24	7	1	0	1	2
2005–06	Lukko	FIN U20	16	5	3	8	4	9	5	3	8	8
2005–06	Lukko	SM-liiga	33	2	2	4	12	—	—	—	—	—
2005–06	Suomi U20	Mestis	2	0	0	0	2	—	—	—	—	—
2006–07	Lukko	FIN U20	5	0	1	1	0	—	—	—	—	—
2006–07	Lukko	SM-liiga	54	6	8	14	77	3	1	0	1	0
2007–08	Lukko	SM-liiga	50	1	2	3	55	3	0	0	0	2
2008–09	Lukko	SM-liiga	58	5	10	15	16	—	—	—	—	—
2009–10	Lukko	SM-liiga	48	11	7	18	20	4	0	0	0	2
2010–11	Lukko	SM-liiga	43	4	4	8	8	11	1	0	1	0
2011–12	HIFK	SM-liiga	33	2	2	4	41	—	—	—	—	—
2011–12	Kiekko–Vantaa	Mestis	1	0	0	0	0	—	—	—	—	—
2011–12	TPS	SM-liiga	15	1	2	3	0	2	0	0	0	2
2012–13	TPS	SM-liiga	60	8	4	12	22	—	—	—	—	—
2013–14	TPS	Liiga	51	1	5	6	27	—	—	—	—	—
2014–15	TuTo Hockey	Mestis	14	2	3	5	12	—	—	—	—	—
2014–15	EHC Klostersee	GER.3	29	15	19	34	24	5	1	2	3	4
2015–16	EHC Klostersee	GER.3	7	2	1	3	0	—	—	—	—	—
2015–16	TuTo Hockey	Mestis	25	5	3	8	18	—	—	—	—	—
Mestis totals			115	15	13	28	58	7	1	0	1	2
SM-liiga/Liiga totals			445	41	46	87	278	23	2	0	2	6

=== International ===
Year	Team	Event	GP	G	A	Pts	PIM
2004	Finland	WJC18	6	1	0	1	4
Junior totals			6	1	0	1	4
