= Timo Helbling =

Swiss ice hockey player (born 1981)

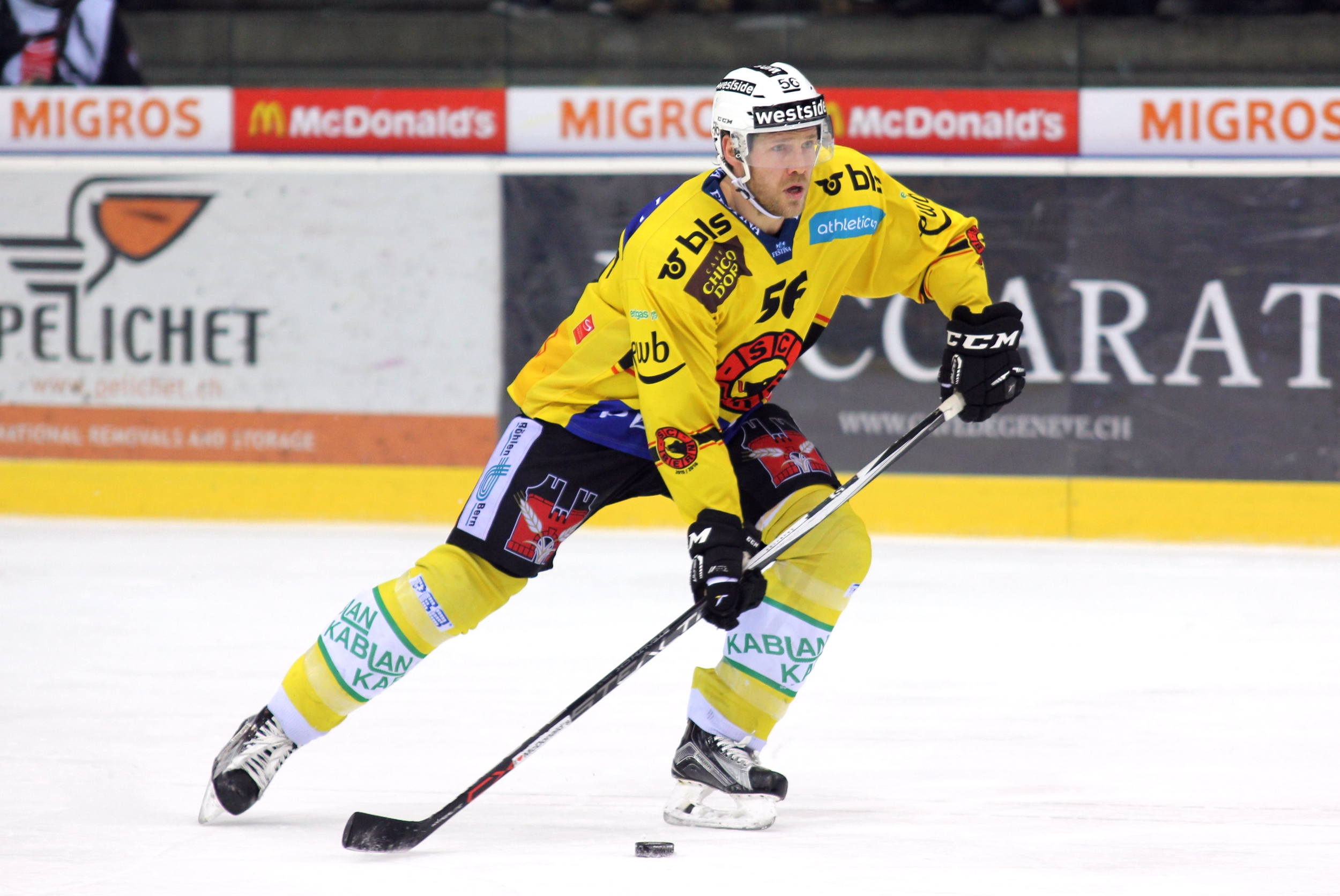
- Born: July 21, 1981 (age 44) Basel, Switzerland
- Height: 6 ft 3 in (191 cm)
- Weight: 220 lb (100 kg; 15 st 10 lb)
- Position: Defence
- Shot: Right
- Played for: HC Davos; Kloten Flyers; Tampa Bay Lightning; Washington Capitals; HC Lugano; Oulun Kärpät; EV Zug; HC Fribourg-Gottéron; SC Bern; SC Rapperswil-Jona Lakers
- National team: Switzerland
- NHL draft: 162nd Overall, 1999; Nashville Predators
- Playing career: 1998–2019

Timo Helbling (born July 21, 1981) is a Swiss former professional ice hockey defenceman who played in the National League (NL) for HC Davos, Kloten Flyers, HC Lugano, HC Fribourg-Gottéron, SC Bern, EV Zug, SC Rapperswil-Jona Lakers, Oulun Kärpät of the Finish Liiga, the Tampa Bay Lightning and the Washington Capitals of the National Hockey League (NHL). Helbling was originally drafted 162nd overall by the Nashville Predators in the 1999 NHL entry draft.

== Playing career ==
As a youth, Helbling played in the 1995 Quebec International Pee-Wee Hockey Tournament with a team from Zürich. Helbling was drafted in the 6th round, 162nd overall by the Nashville Predators in the 1999 NHL entry draft. In the 2005–06 season, Helbling played 60 games for the Springfield Falcons of the AHL before he was recalled to the Tampa Bay Lightning to make his NHL debut.

Helbling signed with the Washington Capitals for the 2006–07 season, playing primarily with AHL affiliate, the Hershey Bears, before he was traded by the Capitals to the Sabres along with Dainius Zubrus for a first round pick and Jiri Novotny on February 27, 2007. Helbling was then assigned to the affiliate of the Sabres, the Rochester Americans.

Following the season, Timo returned to his native Switzerland, signing with HC Lugano. But revoke his deal with HC Lugano and make remaining season contract with Oulun Kärpät contract includes trial period until Christmas brake. Helbling plays his first game in Oulun Kärpät on November 16, 2010. During the World Hockey Championships 2010 Helbling caused confusion by getting in an altercation with Germany's coaches after losing a game against them.

After two seasons with HC Fribourg-Gottéron, Helbling was traded with a year remaining on his contract to fellow NLA club, SC Bern in exchange for Ryan Gardner on April 2, 2015.

On September 11, 2017, Helbling was suspended for 6 games and fined CHF 5,400 for a hit on a referee during a game against HC Davos on September 8, 2017.

On June 18, 2018, Helbling joined freshly promoted SC Rapperswil-Jona Lakers on a one-year deal worth CHF 450,000. In the 2018-19 season, Helbling helped the Lakers remain in the NL, posting 1 goal and 4 points in 26 games before concluding his 621-game National League career at the conclusion of the season on April 9, 2019.

== Career statistics ==
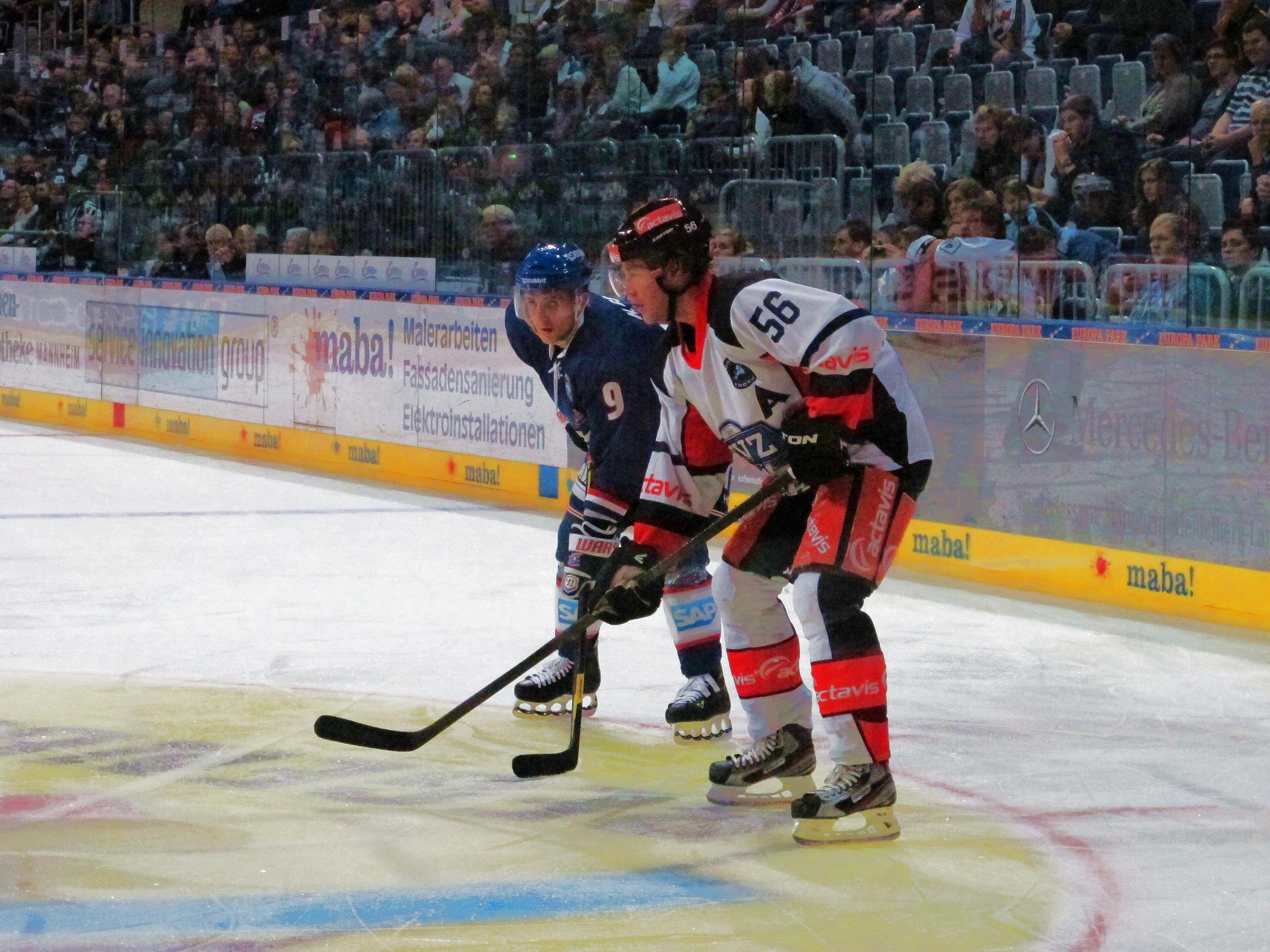
Helbling defending Marcel Goc.

=== Regular season and playoffs ===
			Regular season					Playoffs
Season	Team	League	GP	G	A	Pts	PIM	GP	G	A	Pts	PIM
1998–99	HC Davos	NLA	44	0	0	0	8	4	0	0	0	0
1999–00	HC Davos	NLA	44	0	0	0	49	5	0	0	0	0
2000–01	Windsor Spitfires	OHL	54	7	14	21	90	7	0	2	2	11
2000–01	Milwaukee Admirals	IHL	—	—	—	—	—	1	0	0	0	0
2001–02	Milwaukee Admirals	AHL	67	2	6	8	59	—	—	—	—	—
2002–03	Toledo Storm	ECHL	35	3	8	11	75	7	0	1	1	2
2002–03	Milwaukee Admirals	AHL	23	0	1	1	37	—	—	—	—	—
2003–04	Milwaukee Admirals	AHL	37	0	2	2	46	—	—	—	—	—
2003–04	Utah Grizzlies	AHL	23	3	2	5	47	—	—	—	—	—
2004–05	EHC Kloten	NLA	44	2	9	11	118	—	—	—	—	—
2005–06	Springfield Falcons	AHL	60	7	14	21	56	—	—	—	—	—
2005–06	Tampa Bay Lightning	NHL	9	0	1	1	6	—	—	—	—	—
2006–07	Hershey Bears	AHL	49	1	16	17	106	—	—	—	—	—
2006–07	Washington Capitals	NHL	2	0	0	0	2	—	—	—	—	—
2006–07	Rochester Americans	AHL	20	0	8	8	50	6	2	0	2	6
2007–08	HC Lugano	NLA	49	3	11	14	127	—	—	—	—	—
2008–09	HC Lugano	NLA	49	2	9	11	136	7	0	1	1	12
2009–10	HC Lugano	NLA	46	1	6	7	168	4	0	0	0	10
2010–11	HC Lugano	NLA	17	0	0	0	26	—	—	—	—	—
2010–11	Oulun Kärpät	SM-l	39	2	3	5	46	3	0	0	0	6
2011–12	EV Zug	NLA	45	2	6	8	108	9	0	2	2	16
2012–13	EV Zug	NLA	48	3	7	10	68	14	1	2	3	45
2013–14	HC Fribourg-Gottéron	NLA	46	3	8	11	116	10	1	2	3	12
2014–15	HC Fribourg-Gottéron	NLA	45	2	10	12	86	—	—	—	—	—
2015–16	SC Bern	NLA	50	4	19	23	54	13	2	1	3	24
2016–17	EV Zug	NLA	40	3	3	16	89	4	1	1	2	16
2017–18	EV Zug	NL	28	1	2	3	24	5	0	0	0	10
2018–19	SC Rapperswil-Jona Lakers	NL	26	1	3	4	28	—	—	—	—	—
NL totals			621	27	101	128	1205	87	5	13	18	173
NHL totals			11	0	1	1	8	—	—	—	—	—

=== International ===
Year	Team	Event	Result	GP	G	A	Pts	PIM
1999	Switzerland	WJC18	4th	7	1	0	1	35
2000	Switzerland	WJC	6th	7	0	2	2	16
2001	Switzerland	WJC	6th	7	1	1	2	10
2006	Switzerland	WC	9th	4	0	0	0	2
2010	Switzerland	WC	5th	7	0	1	1	25
2015	Switzerland	WC	8th	7	0	0	0	8
Junior totals				21	2	3	5	61
Senior totals				18	0	1	1	35
