= Michael Ryan (ice hockey) =

American ice hockey player

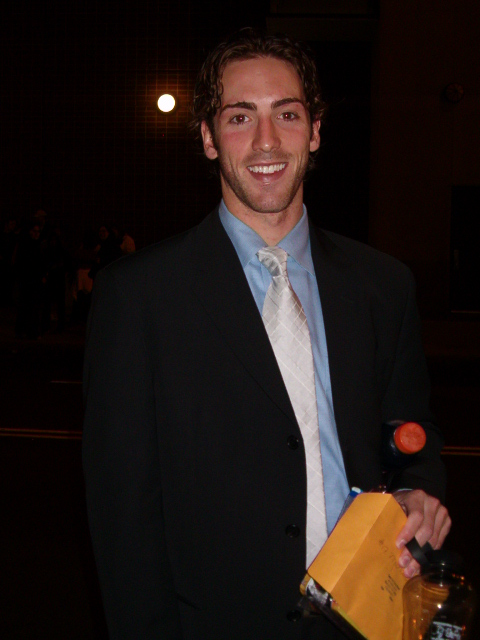
- Ryan in 2006
- Born: May 16, 1980 (age 46) Boston, Massachusetts, U.S.
- Height: 6 ft 1 in (185 cm)
- Weight: 191 lb (87 kg; 13 st 9 lb)
- Position: Forward
- Shot: Left
- Played for: Buffalo Sabres; Carolina Hurricanes; Pori Ässät; KHL Medveščak Zagreb
- NHL draft: 32nd overall, 1999; Dallas Stars
- Playing career: 2003–2016

Michael Ryan (born May 16, 1980) is an American former professional ice hockey forward who played in the National Hockey League. He is currently the Manager of Player Development for the Florida Panthers of the NHL. Ryan was selected by the Dallas Stars in the 2nd round (32nd overall) of the 1999 NHL entry draft.

== Playing career ==
As a youth, Ryan played in the 1994 Quebec International Pee-Wee Hockey Tournament with a minor ice hockey team from South Shore.

Ryan was drafted by the Dallas Stars in the second round, 32nd overall, in the 1999 NHL entry draft. Ryan's rights were traded by the Stars to Buffalo, along with a draft pick, on March 10, 2003, in exchange for Stu Barnes.

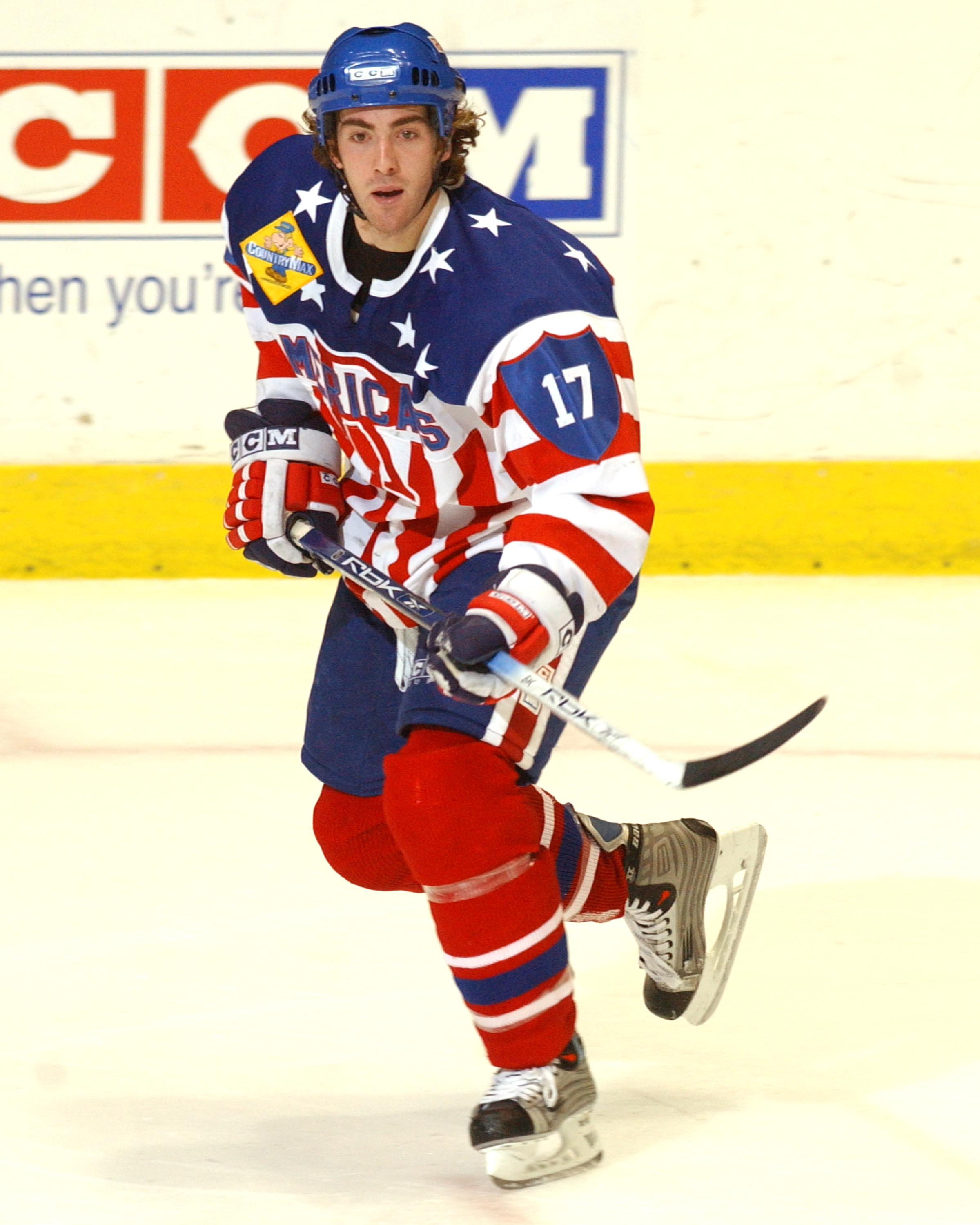
Ryan with the Rochester Americans in 2004

After playing four seasons for Northeastern University, where he led the team in goals his final three years as a Husky, Ryan made his professional debut with the Sabres' American Hockey League affiliate, the Rochester Americans, in the 2003–04 season. He made his NHL debut with the Sabres in the 2006–07 season, appearing in 19 games. He scored his first two career NHL goals on March 2, 2007 against David Aebischer and the Montreal Canadiens in an 8-5 Sabres victory.

Ryan signed a one-year deal with the HC Dinamo Minsk on August 9, 2008, but reported to the Nashville Predators training camp as a free agent tryout on September 19, 2008. He was subsequently released.

On October 31, 2008, Ryan was signed by the Carolina Hurricanes to a 1-year deal and was assigned to their affiliate, the Albany River Rats. Ryan played in 18 games for the Hurricanes during the 2008–09 season and was re-signed to another one-year contract on July 1, 2009.

On October 24, 2010, Ryan signed a professional tryout (PTO) contract with the Springfield Falcons of the AHL.

On November 23, 2010, the Philadelphia Flyers signed Ryan to a one-year contract and assigned him to their AHL affiliate the Adirondack Phantoms. On August 9, 2011, the Buffalo Sabres signed Ryan to a one-year contract to play for their AHL affiliate, the Rochester Americans.

On May 10, 2012, Ryan left for Europe and signed a one-year contract with Ässät of the Finnish SM-liiga.

on June 20, 2013 Ryan signed one-year contract with new KHL team Medveščak Zagreb from Croatia.

Following the 2015–16 season in Finland, having played in only 3 games, Ryan announced his retirement from professional hockey. Beginning with the 2016–17 season, Ryan was selected as an assistant coach of the inaugural Springfield Thunderbirds of the American Hockey League, affiliate to the Florida Panthers.

== Career statistics ==
			Regular season					Playoffs
Season	Team	League	GP	G	A	Pts	PIM	GP	G	A	Pts	PIM
1997–98	Boston College High	USHS	23	22	14	36	28	—	—	—	—	—
1998–99	Boston College High	USHS	21	20	24	44	22	—	—	—	—	—
1999–00	Northeastern University	HE	32	4	9	13	47	—	—	—	—	—
2000–01	Northeastern University	HE	33	17	12	29	52	—	—	—	—	—
2001–02	Northeastern University	HE	36	24	15	39	54	—	—	—	—	—
2002–03	Northeastern University	HE	34	18	14	32	30	—	—	—	—	—
2003–04	Rochester Americans	AHL	45	3	9	12	31	—	—	—	—	—
2004–05	Rochester Americans	AHL	59	11	11	22	20	5	0	1	1	4
2005–06	Rochester Americans	AHL	56	15	22	37	75	—	—	—	—	—
2006–07	Rochester Americans	AHL	50	28	23	51	68	6	4	0	4	4
2006–07	Buffalo Sabres	NHL	19	3	2	5	2	—	—	—	—	—
2007–08	Buffalo Sabres	NHL	46	4	4	8	30	—	—	—	—	—
2008–09	Albany River Rats	AHL	40	25	17	42	34	—	—	—	—	—
2008–09	Carolina Hurricanes	NHL	18	0	2	2	2	—	—	—	—	—
2009–10	Albany River Rats	AHL	3	0	0	0	2	—	—	—	—	—
2010–11	Springfield Falcons	AHL	6	1	2	3	0	—	—	—	—	—
2010–11	Adirondack Phantoms	AHL	52	25	16	41	47	—	—	—	—	—
2011–12	Rochester Americans	AHL	8	1	3	4	19	1	0	0	0	0
2012–13	Ässät	SM-l	53	18	18	36	54	13	5	4	9	16
2013–14	KHL Medveščak Zagreb	KHL	39	10	7	17	28	4	0	0	0	4
2014–15	Ässät	Liiga	7	2	2	4	8	—	—	—	—	—
2015–16	Ässät	Liiga	3	1	1	2	2	—	—	—	—	—
NHL totals			83	7	8	15	34	—	—	—	—	—
