= Mike Card =

Canadian ice hockey player

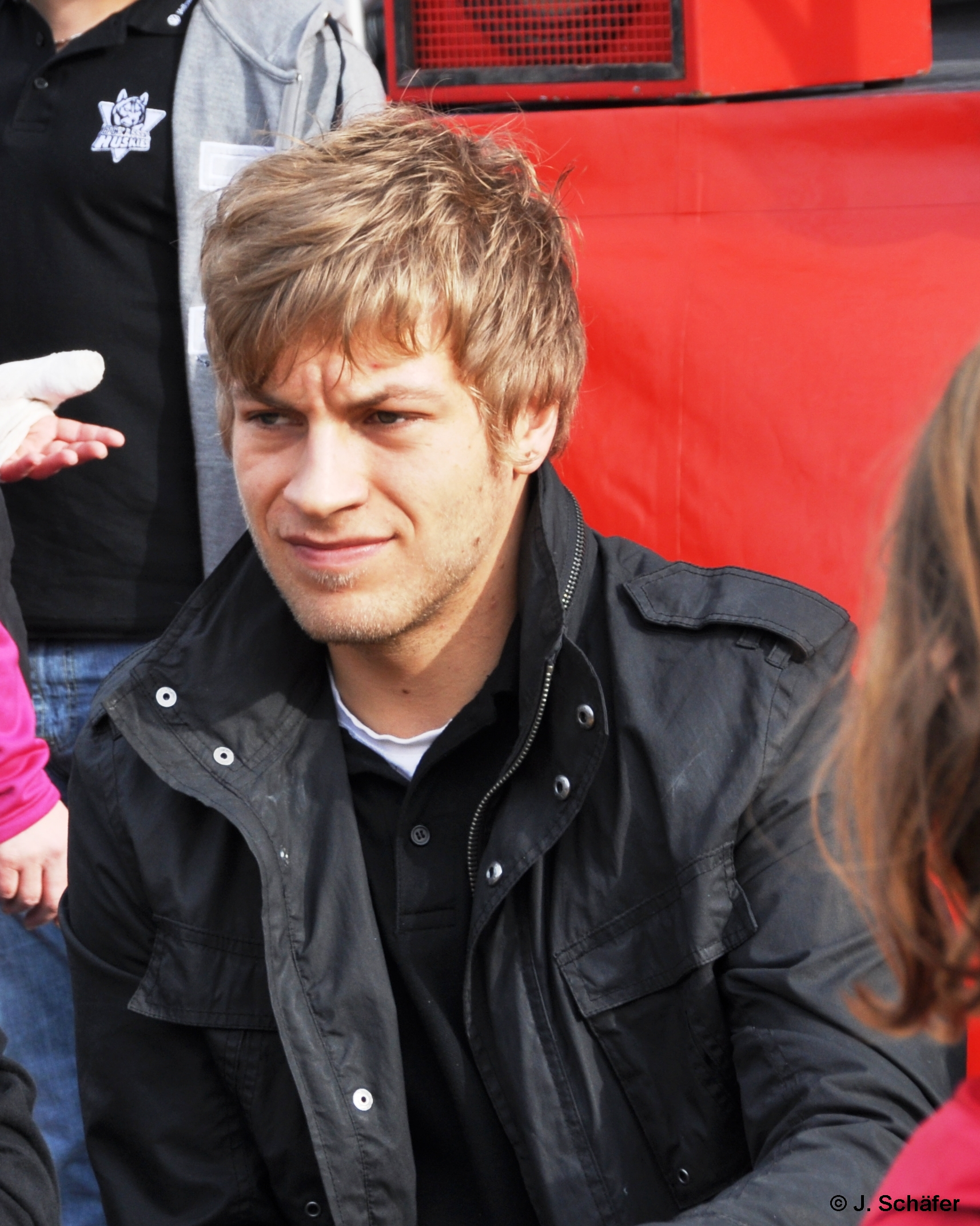
- Card in 2009
- Born: February 18, 1986 (age 40) Kitchener, Ontario, Canada
- Height: 6 ft 1.5 in (187 cm)
- Weight: 200 lb (91 kg; 14 st 4 lb)
- Position: Defence
- Shot: Right
- DEL team Former teams: Löwen Frankfurt; Buffalo Sabres; Rochester Americans; Portland Pirates; Kölner Haie
- NHL draft: 241st overall, 2004; Buffalo Sabres
- Playing career: 2006–2021

Mike Card (born February 18, 1986, in Kitchener, Ontario) is a former professional ice hockey defenceman who last played for Ravensburg Towerstars. He played Junior A hockey in the BCHL at the age of 15 before 4 seasons with the Kelowna Rockets of the WHL, winning 2 WHL titles and the 2004 Memorial Cup. Card signed a contract with the Buffalo Sabres, NHL in 2006 and played 4 games that season. He spent 3 seasons in the AHL, missing extended time due to concussion problems. Card has played the last 8 seasons in Europe, mostly Germany, recently winning a championship with Löwen Frankfurt.

== Playing career ==
Card was drafted in the eighth round, 241st overall, by the Buffalo Sabres in the 2004 NHL entry draft. After moving from Kitchener, Ontario to Penticton, British Columbia in his youth he played in the Western Hockey League with the Kelowna Rockets After playing four seasons with the Rockets, winning one Memorial Cup, Card made his professional debut with the Sabres' American Hockey League affiliate, the Rochester Americans, in the 2006–07 season. He played in four NHL games with the Sabres during the same season.

Released as a free agent after his contract expired with the Sabres, Card left for Germany, signing a contract with the Kassel Huskies of the DEL to score 25 points in 53 games. Card signed a two-year contract with Kölner Haie on July 17, 2010.

== Career statistics ==
			Regular season					Playoffs
Season	Team	League	GP	G	A	Pts	PIM	GP	G	A	Pts	PIM
2001–02	Penticton Panthers	BCHL	50	4	17	21	38	—	—	—	—	—
2002–03	Kelowna Rockets	WHL	61	7	22	29	41	19	2	6	8	12
2003–04	Kelowna Rockets	WHL	72	6	12	18	47	17	2	4	6	20
2004–05	Kelowna Rockets	WHL	72	10	35	45	85	24	2	5	7	38
2005–06	Kelowna Rockets	WHL	64	12	43	55	103	12	0	3	3	8
2006–07	Rochester Americans	AHL	50	1	8	9	38	6	0	0	0	8
2006–07	Buffalo Sabres	NHL	4	0	0	0	0	—	—	—	—	—
2006–07	Florida Everblades	ECHL	6	1	3	4	2	9	1	4	5	14
2007–08	Rochester Americans	AHL	23	1	4	5	32	—	—	—	—	—
2008–09	Portland Pirates	AHL	19	0	1	1	20	—	—	—	—	—
2009–10	Kassel Huskies	DEL	53	6	19	25	66	—	—	—	—	—
2010–11	Kölner Haie	DEL	48	1	3	4	28	5	1	0	1	8
2011–12	Alleghe Hockey	ITA	46	4	18	22	64	7	0	2	2	8
2012–13	Tingsryds AIF	Allsv	45	3	8	11	48	10	1	3	4	18
2013–14	Heilbronner Falken	DEL2	46	3	6	9	52	—	—	—	—	—
2014–15	Eispiraten Crimmitschau	DEL2	50	5	30	35	85	—	—	—	—	—
2015–16	Löwen Frankfurt	DEL2	47	3	14	17	75	4	0	1	1	10
2016–17	Löwen Frankfurt	DEL2	52	5	22	27	32	10	0	2	2	8
2017–18	Löwen Frankfurt	DEL2	41	0	7	7	40	12	1	0	1	10
2019–20	EC Bad Nauheim	DEL2	34	5	7	12	22	2	0	0	0	6
2020–21	EC Bad Nauheim	DEL2	11	0	2	2	6	—	—	—	—	—
2020–21	Ravensburg Towerstars	DEL2	16	0	4	4	10	—	—	—	—	—
AHL totals			92	2	13	15	90	6	0	0	0	8
NHL totals			4	0	0	0	0	—	—	—	—	—
DEL2 totals			297	21	92	113	322	28	1	3	4	34
