= Michael Funk =

Canadian ice hockey player

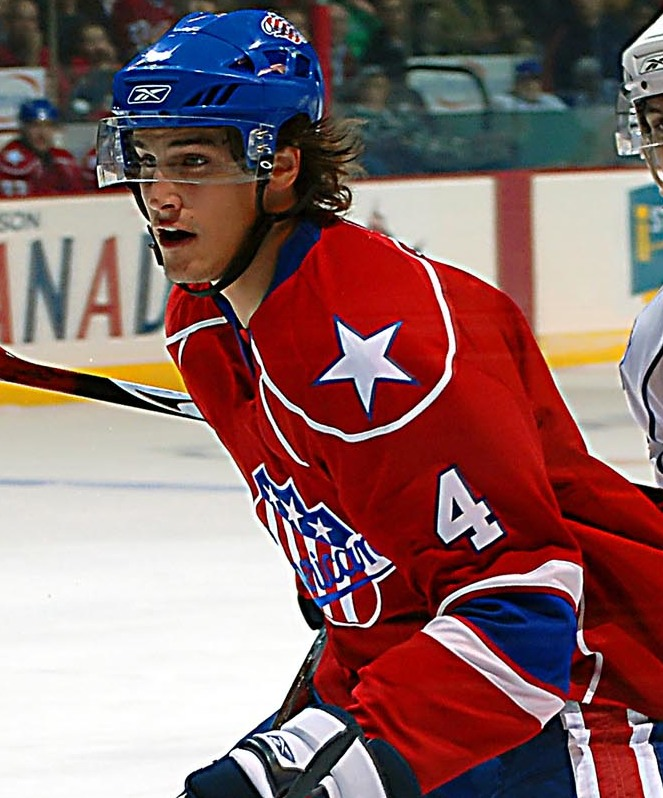
- Funk with the Rochester Americans in 2007
- Born: August 15, 1986 (age 39) Abbotsford, British Columbia, Canada
- Height: 6 ft 4 in (193 cm)
- Weight: 199 lb (90 kg; 14 st 3 lb)
- Position: Defence
- Shot: Left
- Played for: Buffalo Sabres
- NHL draft: 43rd overall, 2004; Buffalo Sabres
- Playing career: 2006–2010

Michael "Mike" Funk (born August 15, 1986) is a Canadian former professional ice hockey defenceman who played in the National Hockey League (NHL) with the Buffalo Sabres. He was drafted by the Sabres in the second round, 43rd overall, of the 2004 NHL entry draft.

== Playing career ==
Funk spent his junior hockey career with the Portland Winter Hawks of the Western Hockey League where he compiled 121 points and 312 penalty minutes in four seasons. Funk signed his first professional contract in June 2006 with the Buffalo Sabres, and made his NHL debut with the team on November 18 of the 2006–07 season. He played in five NHL games with the Sabres in 2006–07, recording two assists.

On July 6, 2009, he was signed by the Vancouver Canucks and was playing with their American Hockey League affiliate, the Manitoba Moose. Funk received a concussion and was forced into retirement after a hit to the head during practice from teammate Patrick Kaleta. This was also his fourth concussion in 14 months, and he was advised by doctors to stop playing hockey.

== Career statistics ==
=== Regular season and playoffs ===
			Regular season					Playoffs
Season	Team	League	GP	G	A	Pts	PIM	GP	G	A	Pts	PIM
2002–03	Portland Winter Hawks	WHL	68	1	15	16	54	7	0	1	1	15
2003–04	Portland Winter Hawks	WHL	71	3	25	28	86	5	0	1	1	6
2004–05	Portland Winter Hawks	WHL	71	8	22	30	84	7	1	1	2	4
2005–06	Portland Winter Hawks	WHL	70	11	36	47	88	5	0	0	0	8
2006–07	Rochester Americans	AHL	61	2	5	7	57	6	0	1	1	4
2006–07	Buffalo Sabres	NHL	5	0	2	2	0	—	—	—	—	—
2007–08	Rochester Americans	AHL	58	0	10	10	104	—	—	—	—	—
2007–08	Buffalo Sabres	NHL	4	0	0	0	0	—	—	—	—	—
2008–09	Portland Pirates	AHL	13	1	2	3	8	—	—	—	—	—
2009–10	Manitoba Moose	AHL	19	1	6	7	14	—	—	—	—	—
AHL totals			151	4	23	27	182	6	0	1	1	4
NHL totals			9	0	2	2	0	—	—	—	—	—

=== International ===
Year	Team	Event	GP	G	A	Pts	PIM
2003	Canada	U18	5	0	0	0	0
2004	Canada	WJC18	7	0	1	1	2
Junior totals			12	0	1	1	2
