= Valeri Klimov (ice hockey) =

Russian ice hockey player

- Born: 17 July 1986 (age 39) Moscow, Soviet Union
- Height: 6 ft 3 in (191 cm)
- Weight: 227 lb (103 kg; 16 st 3 lb)
- Position: Defence
- Shot: Left
- Played for: HC Spartak Moscow
- NHL draft: 282nd overall, 2004; New Jersey Devils
- Playing career: 2004–2007

Valeri Klimov is a Russian ice hockey defenceman who played in the HC Spartak Moscow hockey system.

== Career ==
Klimov spent several seasons with club teams and was a member of Russia's U18 and U20 national teams. The New Jersey Devils selected him late in the 2004 NHL entry draft as their 282nd overall pick, making him the last Russian selected that year. Klimov made his Russian Superleague debut with HC Spartak Moscow during the 2005–2006 season. But when the club disintegrated during the summer of 2006, the young defenseman signed a tryout contract with Khimik Voskresensk, and spent the 2006–2007 season in that club's system.

== Career statistics ==
=== Regular season and playoffs ===
			Regular season					Playoffs
Season	Team	League	GP	G	A	Pts	PIM	GP	G	A	Pts	PIM
2000–01	Spartak–2 Moscow	RUS.3	3	0	1	1	0	—	—	—	—	—
2001–02	Spartak–2 Moscow	RUS.3	25	1	1	2	6	—	—	—	—	—
2002–03	Spartak–2 Moscow	RUS.3	31	3	3	6	28	—	—	—	—	—
2003–04	Spartak–2 Moscow	RUS.3	57	5	10	15	54	—	—	—	—	—
2004–05	Spartak Moscow	RSL	6	0	0	0	2	—	—	—	—	—
2004–05	Spartak–2 Moscow	RUS.3	57	4	13	17	28	—	—	—	—	—
2005–06	Spartak Moscow	RSL	23	1	0	1	4	2	0	0	0	2
2005–06	Spartak–2 Moscow	RUS.3	22	1	4	5	28	—	—	—	—	—
2006–07	Khimik Voskresensk	RUS.2	3	0	1	1	2	—	—	—	—	—
RUS.3 totals			195	14	32	46	144	—	—	—	—	—
RSL totals			29	1	0	1	6	2	0	0	0	2

=== International ===
Year	Team	Event	GP	G	A	Pts	PIM
2003	Russia	U18	5	0	0	0	10
Junior totals			5	0	0	0	10
