= 2006 World Junior Ice Hockey Championships rosters =

Below are the rosters for teams competing in the 2006 World Junior Ice Hockey Championships.

== Group A ==
=== Canada ===
- Head coach: (Canada) Brent Sutter

| Pos. | No. | Player | Team | NHL Rights |
|---|---|---|---|---|
| GK | 30 | Devan Dubnyk | (Canada) Kamloops Blazers | Edmonton Oilers |
| GK | 33 | Justin Pogge | (Canada) Calgary Hitmen | Toronto Maple Leafs |
| D | 3 | Marc Staal | (Canada) Sudbury Wolves | New York Rangers |
| D | 4 | Ryan Parent | (Canada) Guelph Storm | Nashville Predators |
| D | 6 | Luc Bourdon | (Canada) Val d'Or Foreurs | Vancouver Canucks |
| D | 10 | Kris Russell | (Canada) Medicine Hat Tigers | Columbus Blue Jackets |
| D | 12 | Kris Letang | (Canada) Val d'Or Foreurs | Pittsburgh Penguins |
| D | 25 | Cam Barker | (Canada) Medicine Hat Tigers | Chicago Blackhawks |
| D | 36 | Sasha Pokulok | (United States) Cornell University | Washington Capitals |
| F | 7 | Steve Downie | (Canada) Peterborough Petes | Philadelphia Flyers |
| F | 9 | Andrew Cogliano | (United States) University of Michigan | Edmonton Oilers |
| F | 14 | Blake Comeau | (Canada) Kelowna Rockets | New York Islanders |
| F | 16 | Dustin Boyd | (Canada) Moose Jaw Warriors | Calgary Flames |
| F | 17 | Kyle Chipchura | (Canada) Prince Albert Raiders | Montreal Canadiens |
| F | 19 | Dave Bolland | (Canada) London Knights | Chicago Blackhawks |
| F | 20 | Guillaume Latendresse | (Canada) Drummondville Voltigeurs | Montreal Canadiens |
| F | 21 | Mike Blunden | (Canada) Erie Otters | Chicago Blackhawks |
| F | 22 | Dan Bertram | (United States) Boston College | Chicago Blackhawks |
| F | 23 | Ryan O'Marra | (Canada) Erie Otters | New York Islanders |
| F | 27 | Tom Pyatt | (United States) Saginaw Spirit | New York Rangers |
| F | 29 | Jonathan Toews | (United States) University of North Dakota | |
| F | 37 | Benoît Pouliot | (Canada) Sudbury Wolves | Minnesota Wild |

=== United States ===
- Head coach: (United States) Walt Kyle

| Pos. | No. | Player | Team | NHL Rights |
|---|---|---|---|---|
| GK | 1 | Cory Schneider | (United States) Boston College | Vancouver Canucks |
| GK | 30 | Jeff Frazee | (United States) University of Minnesota | New Jersey Devils |
| D | 2 | Taylor Chorney | (United States) University of North Dakota | Edmonton Oilers |
| D | 3 | Jack Johnson | (United States) University of Michigan | Carolina Hurricanes |
| D | 4 | Chris Butler | (United States) University of Denver | Buffalo Sabres |
| D | 6 | Erik Johnson | (United States) U.S. National Team Development Program | |
| D | 15 | Matt Niskanen | (United States) University of Minnesota Duluth | Dallas Stars |
| D | 22 | Brian Lee | (United States) University of North Dakota | Ottawa Senators |
| D | 23 | Mark Mitera | (United States) University of Michigan | |
| F | 7 | T. J. Oshie | (United States) University of North Dakota | St. Louis Blues |
| F | 8 | Phil Kessel | (United States) University of Minnesota | |
| F | 9 | Bobby Ryan | (Canada) Owen Sound Attack | Mighty Ducks of Anaheim |
| F | 10 | Nathan Davis | (United States) Miami University | Chicago Blackhawks |
| F | 11 | Kevin Porter | (United States) University of Michigan | Phoenix Coyotes |
| F | 12 | Geoff Paukovich | (United States) University of Denver | Edmonton Oilers |
| F | 16 | Blake Wheeler | (United States) University of Minnesota | Phoenix Coyotes |
| F | 17 | Rob Schremp | (Canada) London Knights | Edmonton Oilers |
| F | 20 | Nathan Gerbe | (United States) Boston College | Buffalo Sabres |
| F | 21 | Jack Skille | (United States) University of Wisconsin | Chicago Blackhawks |
| F | 24 | Peter Mueller | (Canada) Everett Silvertips | |
| F | 26 | Tom Fritsche | (United States) Ohio State University | Colorado Avalanche |
| F | 27 | Chris Bourque | (United States) Hershey Bears | Washington Capitals |

=== Finland ===
- Head coach: (Finland) Hannu Aravirta

| Pos. | No. | Player | Team | NHL Rights |
|---|---|---|---|---|
| GK | 1 | Karri Rämö | (Finland) HPK | Tampa Bay Lightning |
| GK | 30 | Tuukka Rask | (Finland) Ilves | Toronto Maple Leafs |
| D | 2 | Matti Koistinen | (Finland) Tappara | |
| D | 4 | Risto Korhonen | (Finland) HPK | Carolina Hurricanes |
| D | 6 | Timo Seppänen | (Finland) HIFK | |
| D | 7 | Erkka Leppänen | (Finland) JYP Jyväskylä | |
| D | 8 | Juho Jokinen | (Finland) TUTO Hockey | |
| D | 14 | Tommi Leinonen | (Finland) Oulun Kärpät | Pittsburgh Penguins |
| D | 26 | Teemu Laakso | (Finland) HIFK | Nashville Predators |
| F | 9 | Lauri Tukonen | (United States) Los Angeles Kings | Los Angeles Kings |
| F | 10 | Mikko Alikoski | (Finland) Oulun Kärpät | |
| F | 11 | Janne Kolehmainen | (Finland) SaiPa | Ottawa Senators |
| F | 13 | Petteri Wirtanen | (Finland) HPK | |
| F | 15 | Perttu Lindgren | (Finland) Ilves | Dallas Stars |
| F | 16 | Leo Komarov | (Finland) Ässät | |
| F | 18 | Aki Seitsonen | (Canada) Prince Albert Raiders | Calgary Flames |
| F | 19 | Jesse Joensuu | (Finland) Ässät | |
| F | 21 | Jari Sailio | (Finland) HPK | |
| F | 23 | Mikko Lehtonen | (Finland) Espoo Blues | Boston Bruins |
| F | 24 | Tomas Sinisalo | (Finland) SaiPa | |
| F | 25 | Lauri Korpikoski | (Finland) HC TPS | New York Rangers |
| F | 29 | Henri Heino | (Finland) Lahti Pelicans | |

=== Switzerland ===
- Head coach: (Switzerland) Jakob Kölliker

| Pos. | No. | Player | Team | NHL Rights |
|---|---|---|---|---|
| GK | 20 | Reto Berra | (Switzerland) GCK Lions | |
| GK | 30 | Leonardo Genoni | (Switzerland) GCK Lions | |
| D | 2 | Yannick Weber | (Switzerland) SC Bern | |
| D | 3 | Eric Blum | (Switzerland) GCK Lions | |
| D | 5 | Patrick Parati | (Switzerland) SC Rapperswil-Jona Lakers | |
| D | 6 | Claudio Berchtold | (Switzerland) SC Langenthal | |
| D | 7 | Alessandro Chiesa | (Switzerland) HC Lugano | |
| D | 8 | Simon Lüthi | (Switzerland) SCL Tigers | |
| D | 16 | Raphael Diaz | (Switzerland) EV Zug | |
| F | 9 | Mathias Joggi | (Switzerland) EHC Biel | |
| F | 11 | Janick Steinmann | (Canada) Kamloops Blazers | |
| F | 12 | Julien Sprunger | (Switzerland) HC Fribourg-Gottéron | Minnesota Wild |
| F | 13 | Stephan Moser | (Switzerland) SCL Tigers | |
| F | 14 | Matthias Bieber | (Switzerland) GCK Lions | |
| F | 17 | Dario Bürgler | (Switzerland) EV Zug | |
| F | 18 | Jérémy Gailland | (Switzerland) Kloten Flyers | |
| F | 19 | Nico Spolidoro | (Switzerland) EHC Biel | |
| F | 21 | Juraj Šimek | (Switzerland) Kloten Flyers | |
| F | 24 | Fadri Lemm | (Switzerland) EHC Chur | |
| F | 26 | Christopher Rivera | (Switzerland) Genève-Servette HC | |
| F | 27 | Steve Kellenberger | (Switzerland) Kloten Flyers | |
| F | 29 | Julian Walker | (Switzerland) EHC Basel | |

=== Norway ===
- Head coach: (Norway) Petter Thoresen

| Pos. | No. | Player | Team | NHL Rights |
|---|---|---|---|---|
| GK | 1 | Lars Haugen | (Sweden) Leksands IF | |
| GK | 30 | Ruben Smith | (Norway) Storhamar Ishockey | |
| D | 5 | Jonas Nygård | (Norway) Vålerenga Ishockey | |
| D | 6 | Henrik Borge | (Norway) Sparta Warriors | |
| D | 11 | Jonas Holøs | (Norway) Sparta Warriors | |
| D | 17 | Lars Løkken Østli | (Norway) Storhamar Ishockey | |
| D | 23 | Eirik Grafsrønningen | (Norway) Lillehammer IK | |
| D | 25 | Alexander Bonsaksen | (Norway) Vålerenga Ishockey | |
| D | 27 | Dennis Sveum | (Norway) Lillehammer IK | |
| F | 7 | Kristian Forsberg | (Norway) Storhamar Ishockey | |
| F | 9 | Per Ferdinand Stensund | (Norway) Frisk Asker Ishockey | |
| F | 10 | Martin Scott Hagen | (Norway) Vålerenga Ishockey | |
| F | 13 | Martin Røymark | (Norway) Sparta Warriors | |
| F | 15 | Stian Høygård | (Norway) Lillehammer IK | |
| F | 16 | Mats Zuccarello | (Norway) Frisk Asker Ishockey | |
| F | 18 | Marius Mathisrud | (Norway) Vålerenga Ishockey | |
| F | 19 | Mathias Trygg | (Norway) Manglerud Star Ishockey | |
| F | 20 | Mathis Olimb | (Norway) Vålerenga Ishockey | |
| F | 21 | Joakim Jensen | (Canada) Baie-Comeau Drakkar | |
| F | 22 | Morten Rolstad | (Norway) Lillehammer IK | |
| F | 24 | Fredrik Thinn | (Norway) Furuset Ishockey | |
| F | 28 | Niklas Roest | (Norway) Manglerud Star Ishockey | |

== Group B ==
=== Russia ===
- Head coach: (Russia) Sergei Mikhalev

| Pos. | No. | Player | Team | NHL Rights |
|---|---|---|---|---|
| GK | 20 | Semyon Varlamov | (Russia) Lokomotiv Yaroslavl | |
| GK | 30 | Anton Khudobin | (Canada) Saskatoon Blades | Minnesota Wild |
| D | 2 | Alexei Emelin | (Russia) Lada Togliatti | Montreal Canadiens |
| D | 4 | Nikita Nikitin | (Russia) Avangard Omsk | St. Louis Blues |
| D | 6 | Kirill Lyamin | (Russia) CSKA Moscow | Ottawa Senators |
| D | 11 | Andrei Zubarev | (Russia) Ak Bars Kazan | Atlanta Thrashers |
| D | 13 | Alexander Aksyonenko | (Russia) Sibir Novosibirsk | |
| D | 15 | Yevgeny Biryukov | (Russia) Metallurg Magnitogorsk | |
| D | 21 | Vyacheslav Buravchikov | (Russia) Khimik Voskresensk | Buffalo Sabres |
| D | 23 | Denis Bodrov | (Russia) Lada Togliatti | |
| F | 7 | Enver Lisin | (Russia) Ak Bars Kazan | Phoenix Coyotes |
| F | 8 | Evgeny Ketov | (Russia) Lada Togliatti | |
| F | 9 | Ilya Zubov | (Russia) Spartak Moscow | Ottawa Senators |
| F | 10 | Sergei Ogorodnikov | (Russia) CSKA Moscow | New York Islanders |
| F | 14 | Nikolai Kulemin | (Russia) Metallurg Magnitogorsk | |
| F | 16 | Roman Voloshenko | (United States) Houston Aeros | Minnesota Wild |
| F | 17 | Evgeni Malkin | (Russia) Metallurg Magnitogorsk | Pittsburgh Penguins |
| F | 19 | Mikhail Yunkov | (Russia) Ak Bars Kazan | Washington Capitals |
| F | 22 | Alexander Radulov | (Canada) Quebec Remparts | Nashville Predators |
| F | 24 | Gennady Churilov | (Russia) Lokomotiv Yaroslavl | |
| F | 28 | Nikolai Lemtyugov | (Russia) CSKA Moscow | St. Louis Blues |
| F | 29 | Sergei Shirokov | (Russia) CSKA Moscow | |

=== Sweden ===
- Head coach: (Sweden) Torgny Bendelin

| Pos. | No. | Player | Team | NHL Rights |
|---|---|---|---|---|
| GK | 1 | Daniel Larsson | (Sweden) Hammarby Hockey | |
| GK | 30 | Magnus Åkerlund | (Sweden) HV71 | Carolina Hurricanes |
| D | 2 | Niklas Andersson | (Sweden) Brynäs IF | |
| D | 6 | Anton Strålman | (Sweden) Timrå IK | Toronto Maple Leafs |
| D | 7 | Tobias Viklund | (Sweden) Modo Hockey | |
| D | 8 | Oscar Hedman | (Sweden) Modo Hockey | Washington Capitals |
| D | 10 | Alexander Edler | (Canada) Kelowna Rockets | Vancouver Canucks |
| D | 12 | Tommy Wargh | (Sweden) Modo Hockey | |
| D | 15 | Petter Ullman | (Sweden) Leksands IF | |
| F | 3 | Sebastian Karlsson | (Sweden) Frölunda HC | |
| F | 4 | Mattias Hellström | (Sweden) Modo Hockey | |
| F | 11 | Erik Andersson | (Sweden) HV71 | |
| F | 16 | Anton Axelsson | (Sweden) Frölunda HC | Detroit Red Wings |
| F | 17 | Oscar Sundh | (Canada) St. John's Fog Devils | |
| F | 18 | Niclas Bergfors | (United States) New Jersey Devils | New Jersey Devils |
| F | 19 | Nicklas Bäckström | (Sweden) Brynäs IF | |
| F | 21 | Mattias Ritola | (Sweden) Leksands IF | Detroit Red Wings |
| F | 22 | Fredrik Pettersson | (Canada) Calgary Hitmen | Edmonton Oilers |
| F | 23 | Jonathan Granström | (Sweden) Mora IK | |
| F | 25 | Johannes Salmonsson | (United States) Spokane Chiefs | Pittsburgh Penguins |
| F | 27 | Robin Lindqvist | (Sweden) Luleå HF | |
| F | 29 | Johan Ryno | (Sweden) IK Oskarshamn | Detroit Red Wings |

=== Czech Republic ===
- Head coach: (Czech Republic) Radim Rulík

| Pos. | No. | Player | Team | NHL Rights |
|---|---|---|---|---|
| GK | 1 | Radek Fiala | (Czech Republic) HC Litvínov | |
| GK | 30 | Marek Schwarz | (Czech Republic) Sparta Prague | St. Louis Blues |
| D | 5 | Ondřej Šmach | (Czech Republic) Orli Znojmo | |
| D | 6 | Roman Polák | (Czech Republic) HC Vítkovice | St. Louis Blues |
| D | 8 | Ladislav Šmíd | (United States) Portland Pirates | Mighty Ducks of Anaheim |
| D | 9 | Jakub Kindl | (Canada) Kitchener Rangers | Detroit Red Wings |
| D | 14 | Jaroslav Mrázek | (Canada) St. Michael's Majors | New York Islanders |
| D | 15 | Tomáš Kudělka | (Canada) Lethbridge Hurricanes | Ottawa Senators |
| D | 24 | Michal Gulaši | (Czech Republic) HC Vítkovice | |
| F | 3 | Petr Kalus | (Canada) Regina Pats | Boston Bruins |
| F | 7 | Jiří Tlustý | (Czech Republic) HC Kladno | |
| F | 11 | Vladimír Sobotka | (Czech Republic) Slavia Prague | Boston Bruins |
| F | 12 | Václav Meidl | (United States) Plymouth Whalers | Nashville Predators |
| F | 16 | Michal Birner | (United States) Saginaw Spirit | St. Louis Blues |
| F | 17 | Karel Hromas | (Canada) Everett Silvertips | Chicago Blackhawks |
| F | 18 | Petr Pohl | (Canada) Acadie-Bathurst Titan | Columbus Blue Jackets |
| F | 19 | Jakub Šindel | (Czech Republic) HC Plzeň | Chicago Blackhawks |
| F | 20 | Zdeněk Bahenský | (Canada) Saskatoon Blades | New York Rangers |
| F | 22 | Martin Hanzal | (Czech Republic) Motor České Budějovice | Phoenix Coyotes |
| F | 23 | David Krejčí | (Canada) Gatineau Olympiques | Boston Bruins |
| F | 25 | Michael Frolík | (Czech Republic) HC Kladno | |
| F | 28 | Tomáš Káňa | (Czech Republic) HC Vítkovice | |

=== Slovakia ===
- Head coach: (Slovakia) Branislav Šajban

| Pos. | No. | Player | Team | NHL Rights |
|---|---|---|---|---|
| GK | 1 | Michal Valent | (Czech Republic) Sparta Prague | Buffalo Sabres |
| GK | 30 | Vladimír Kováč | (Slovakia) Dukla Trenčín | |
| D | 3 | Andrej Sekera | (Canada) Owen Sound Attack | Buffalo Sabres |
| D | 6 | Michal Korenko | (United States) Lewiston MAINEiacs | |
| D | 7 | Martin Gründling | (Canada) Moose Jaw Warriors | |
| D | 14 | Filip Šimka | (Slovakia) MHC Martin | |
| D | 16 | Vladimír Mihálik | (Canada) Red Deer Rebels | Tampa Bay Lightning |
| D | 19 | Jozef Wagenhoffer | (Slovakia) Slovan Bratislava | |
| D | 28 | Boris Valábik | (Canada) Kitchener Rangers | Atlanta Thrashers |
| F | 8 | Marek Zagrapan | (Canada) Chicoutimi Saguenéens | Buffalo Sabres |
| F | 11 | Igor Baček | (United States) Tri-City Americans | |
| F | 12 | Juraj Mikúš | (Slovakia) HK 36 Skalica | Montreal Canadiens |
| F | 15 | Marek Horský | (Canada) Toronto St. Michael's Majors | |
| F | 17 | Stanislav Lašček | (Canada) Chicoutimi Saguenéens | Tampa Bay Lightning |
| F | 18 | Branislav Lemešáni | (United States) Billings Bulls | |
| F | 20 | Ladislav Ščurko | (United States) Seattle Thunderbirds | Philadelphia Flyers |
| F | 21 | Tomáš Petruška | (United States) Cleveland Jr. Barons | |
| F | 22 | Dávid Skokan | (Canada) Rimouski Océanic | |
| F | 23 | Marek Bartánus | (Canada) Owen Sound Attack | Tampa Bay Lightning |
| F | 25 | Juraj Gráčik | (United States) Tri-City Americans | Atlanta Thrashers |
| F | 26 | Erik Piatak | (Slovakia) HK Poprad | |
| F | 29 | Marcel Ulehla | (Slovakia) Slovan Bratislava | |

== Latvia ==
- Head coach: (Latvia) Olegs Znaroks

| Pos. | No. | Player | Team | NHL Rights |
|---|---|---|---|---|
| GK | 1 | Kristaps Stiģis | (Latvia) HK Riga 2000 | |
| GK | 30 | Uģis Avotiņš | (Latvia) HK Riga 2000 | |
| D | 2 | Oskars Bārtulis | (Canada) Moncton Wildcats | Philadelphia Flyers |
| D | 3 | Artūrs Kulda | (Russia) HC CSKA Moscow | |
| D | 4 | Kristaps Sotnieks | (Latvia) HK Riga 2000 | |
| D | 6 | Krišs Grundmanis | (Latvia) HK Riga 2000 | |
| D | 8 | Renārs Demiters | (Latvia) HK Riga 2000 | |
| D | 13 | Edgars Adamovičs | (Latvia) HK Riga 2000 | |
| D | 22 | Jānis Andersons | (Sweden) Almtuna IS | |
| D | 23 | Guntis Galviņš | (Latvia) HK Riga 2000 | |
| F | 7 | Toms Hartmanis | (Sweden) Almtuna IS | |
| F | 9 | Mārtiņš Karsums | (Canada) Moncton Wildcats | Boston Bruins |
| F | 15 | Sergejs Pečura | (Russia) Khimik Voskresensk | |
| F | 16 | Kaspars Daugaviņš | (Latvia) HK Riga 2000 | |
| F | 17 | Elvis Želubovskis | (Latvia) HK Riga 2000 | |
| F | 19 | Andis Āboliņš | (Latvia) HK Riga 2000 | |
| F | 20 | Edžus Kārkliņš | (Latvia) HK Riga 2000 | |
| F | 21 | Kaspars Saulietis | (Latvia) HK Riga 2000 | |
| F | 25 | Eduards Bullītis | (Latvia) HK Riga 2000 | |
| F | 26 | Mārtiņš Skuška | (Latvia) HK Riga 2000 | |
| F | 27 | Gints Meija | (Latvia) HK Riga 2000 | |
| F | 28 | Jurijs Kļujevskis | (Latvia) HK Riga 2000 | |
