= Fiala =

Fiala (feminine: Fialová) is a Czech and Slovak surname, meaning 'violet' (any plant of the genus Viola). Notable people with the surname include:

== Arts and entertainment ==
- Eman Fiala (1899–1970), Czech film actor and composer
- Josef Fiala (1748–1816), composer, musician and pedagogue
- Karel Fiala (1925–2020), Czech opera singer and actor
- Kristina Fialová (born 1987), Czech classical violist
- Květa Fialová (1929–2017), Czech actress
- Severin Fiala (born 1985), Austrian filmmaker
- Vlasta Fialová (1928–1998), Czech actress
- Zuzana Fialová (born 1974), Slovak actress

== Politics and military ==
- Barbara J. Fiala (born 1944), American politician
- Benno Fiala Ritter von Fernbrugg (1890–1964), Austrian war pilot
- Bohuslav Fiala (general) (1890–1964), Czech military leader
- Doris Fiala (born 1957), Swiss politician
- Petr Fiala (born 1964), Czech politician, prime minister in 2021–2025
- Petr Fiala (senator) (born 1968), Czech politician
- Radim Fiala (born 1969), Czech politician and businessman
- Stephen Fiala (born 1967), American politician

== Sports ==
- Bohuslav Fiala (canoeist), Czech slalom canoeist
- Daniel Fiala (born 1972), Czech tennis player
- Ernst Fiala (footballer) (1940–2006), Austrian footballer
- Jakub Fiala (born 1975), Czech-American alpine skier
- Jan Fiala (born 1956), Czech footballer
- Jean-Pierre Fiala (born 1969), Cameroonian footballer
- John Fiala (born 1973), American football linebacker
- Karl Fiala (born 1956), English motorcycle speedway rider
- Kevin Fiala (born 1996), Swiss ice hockey player
- Lucie Fialová (born 1988), Czech squash player
- Martin Fiala (born 1968), Czech-German freestyle skier
- Neil Fiala (born 1956), American baseball player
- Ondřej Fiala (born 1987), Czech ice hockey player
- Radek Fiala (born 1986), Czech ice hockey player
- Tony Fiala (born 1966), Canadian biathlete
- Zbyněk Fiala (born 1964), Czech cyclist

== Other ==
- Anthony Fiala (1869–1950), American explorer
- Ernst Fiala (engineer) (born 1928), Austrian automotive engineer
- Jim Fiala (born c. 1965), American chef
- Miloslav Fiala (1928–2026), Czech priest

== See also ==
- 3695 Fiala (1973 UU4) is a Main-belt Asteroid discovered in 1973
- Beck–Fiala theorem, major theorem in discrepancy theory due to József Beck and Tibor Fiala
- Fiala expedition aka Ziegler Polar Expedition of 1903–1905, a failed attempt to reach the North Pole
- Fiola, a surname
