= Vessel (structure) =

Structure in Manhattan, New York

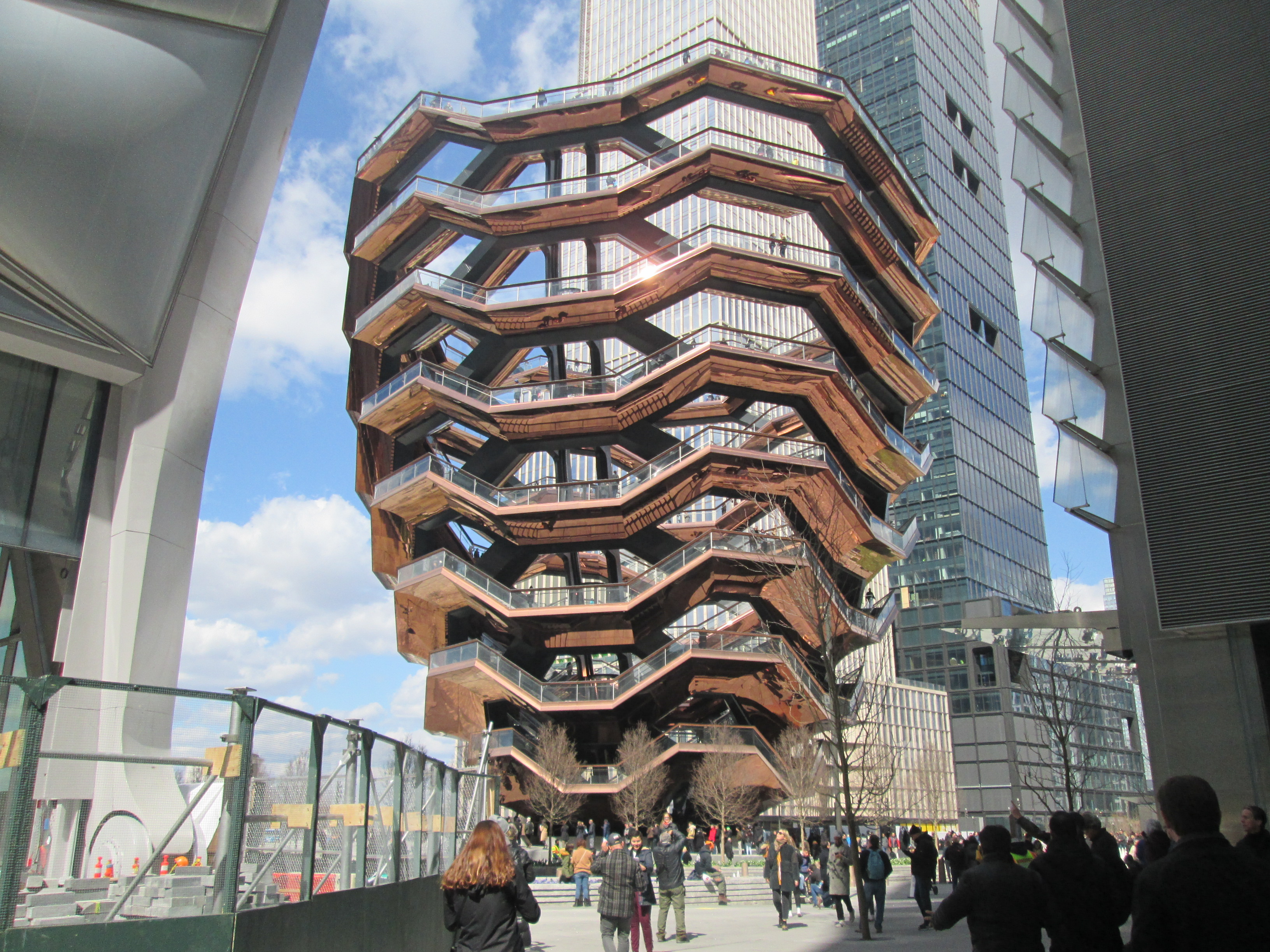
- March 2019, shortly after opening

General information
- Status: Open
- Location: New York City, United States
- Coordinates: 40.7538°N 74.0022°W
- Groundbreaking: April 2017; 9 years ago
- Topped-out: December 2017; 8 years ago
- Opened: March 15, 2019; 7 years ago again on October 28, 2024; 2 years ago
- Cost: US$75–200 million

Height
- Height: 150 ft (46 m)

Technical details
- Floor count: 16

Design and construction
- Architect: Thomas Heatherwick
- Architecture firm: Heatherwick Studio
- Structural engineer: Thornton Tomasetti (Engineer Of Record) and AKT II (Design Engineer)

Website
- www.vesselnyc.com

Vessel is a 16-story, 150-foot-tall (46 m) structure of connected staircases in the 5-acre (2.0 ha) Hudson Yards Public Square of Hudson Yards in Manhattan, New York City. Designed by Thomas Heatherwick, the elaborate honeycomb-like structure consists of 154 flights of stairs, 2,500 steps, and 80 landings for visitors to climb. Funded by Hudson Yards developer Related Companies, its final cost was estimated at $200 million.

The concept of Vessel was publicly presented on September 14, 2016, with construction starting in April 2017, its pieces manufactured in Italy and shipped to the United States. Vessel topped out in December 2017 with the installation of its highest piece, and opened to the public on March 15, 2019. At the time of its opening, Vessel was noted for its sensitive siting within Hudson Yards with points of criticism focusing on its overall extravagance, restrictive copyright photography policy and lack of full accessibility, the latter two issues subsequently resolved.

In response to suicides at the Vessel and installations initially of netting and later glass barriers, the venue underwent a series of closings and reopenings, beginning with a closure January 2021, then an indefinite closing, a reopening in May 2021, and indefinite closure two months later — and a reopening in October 2024 following the installation of glass safety barriers.

== Description ==
=== Structure ===
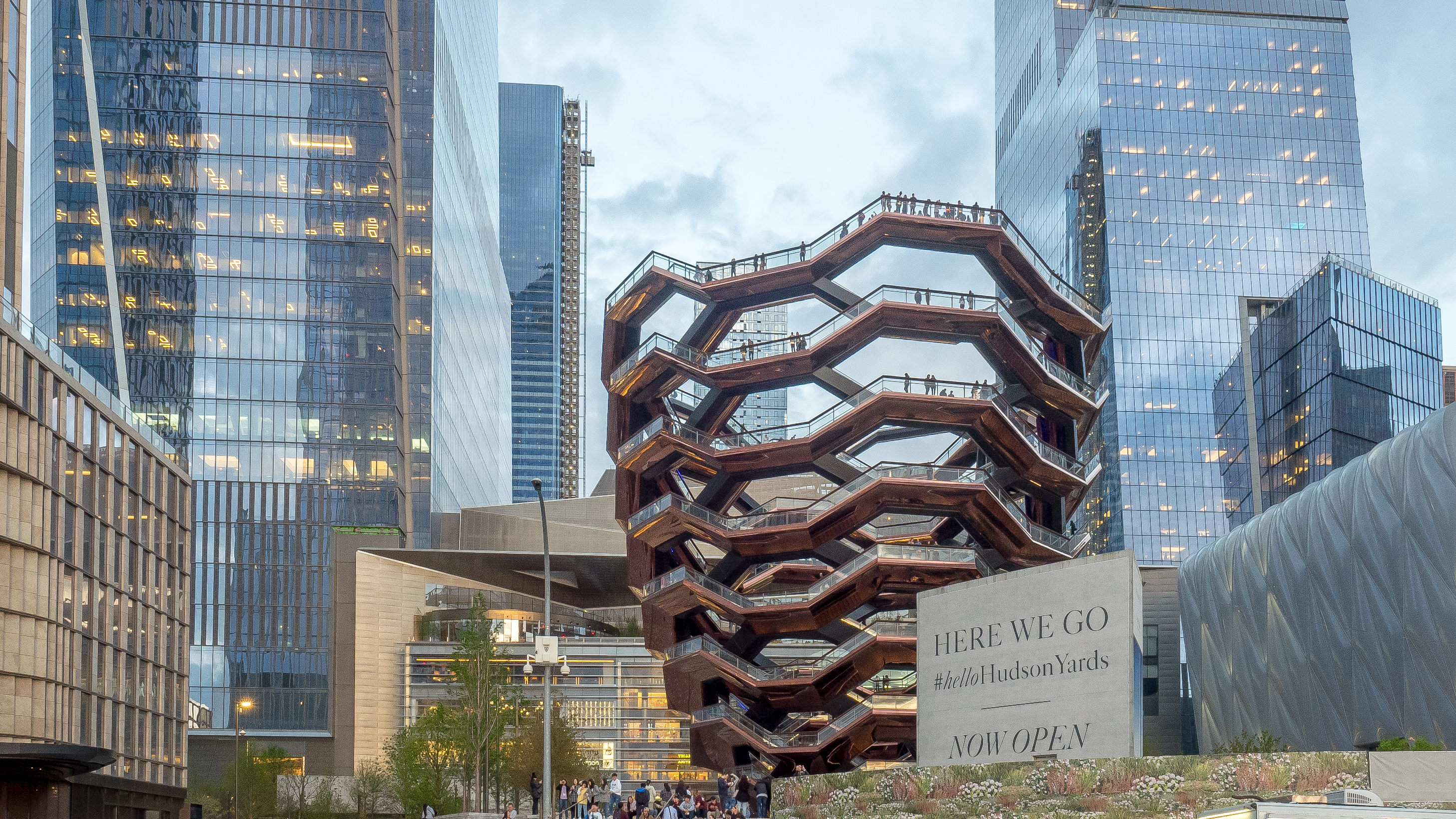
Viewed from 11th Avenue (2019)

Vessel is a 16-story, 150-foot-tall (46 m) structure of connected staircases among the buildings of Hudson Yards, located in the 5-acre (2.0 ha) Hudson Yards Public Square. Designed by Thomas Heatherwick, Vessel has 154 flights, 2,500 steps, and 80 landings, with the total length of the stairs exceeding 1 mile (1.6 km). The copper-clad steps, arranged like a jungle gym and modeled after Indian stepwells, can hold 1,000 people at a time. The structure also has ramps and an elevator to comply with the Americans with Disabilities Act of 1990 (ADA), though only three of Vessel's landings are ADA-accessible as of 2019.

Vessel is 50 feet (15 m) wide at its base, expanding to 150 feet (46 m) at the apex. Stephen Ross, the CEO of Hudson Yards' developer Related Companies, said that its unusual shape was intended to make the structure stand out like a "12-month Christmas tree". Heatherwick said that he intends visitors to climb and explore the structure as if it were a jungle gym. From the top of the structure, visitors can see the Hudson River.

=== Site ===
Vessel is located in Hudson Yards Public Square, landscape design for which was carried out by Thomas Woltz of Nelson Byrd Woltz Landscape Architects. The 5-acre (2 ha) space hosts 28,000 plants and 225 trees in total. A canopy of trees is located in the southern area of the plaza. The southeast entrance to the plaza also includes a fountain. A "seasonally expressive" garden stands across from Vessel outside the entrance to the New York City Subway's 34th Street–Hudson Yards station. The plaza is also connected to the High Line, an elevated promenade that extends south of Hudson Yards.

=== Cost and assembly ===
Although Vessel had originally been slated to cost $75 million, the projections were later revised to between $150 and $200 million. Heatherwick attributed the greatly increased price tag to the complexity of building the steel pieces. The structural steel components were assembled in the comune of Monfalcone in Italy, transported by ship, and off-loaded via docks on the Hudson River.

=== Name ===
"Vessel" was planned to be the structure's temporary name during construction, with a permanent name to be determined later. After Vessel opened, Hudson Yards asked the public to give it a formal name, creating a website devoted to that effect.

== History ==
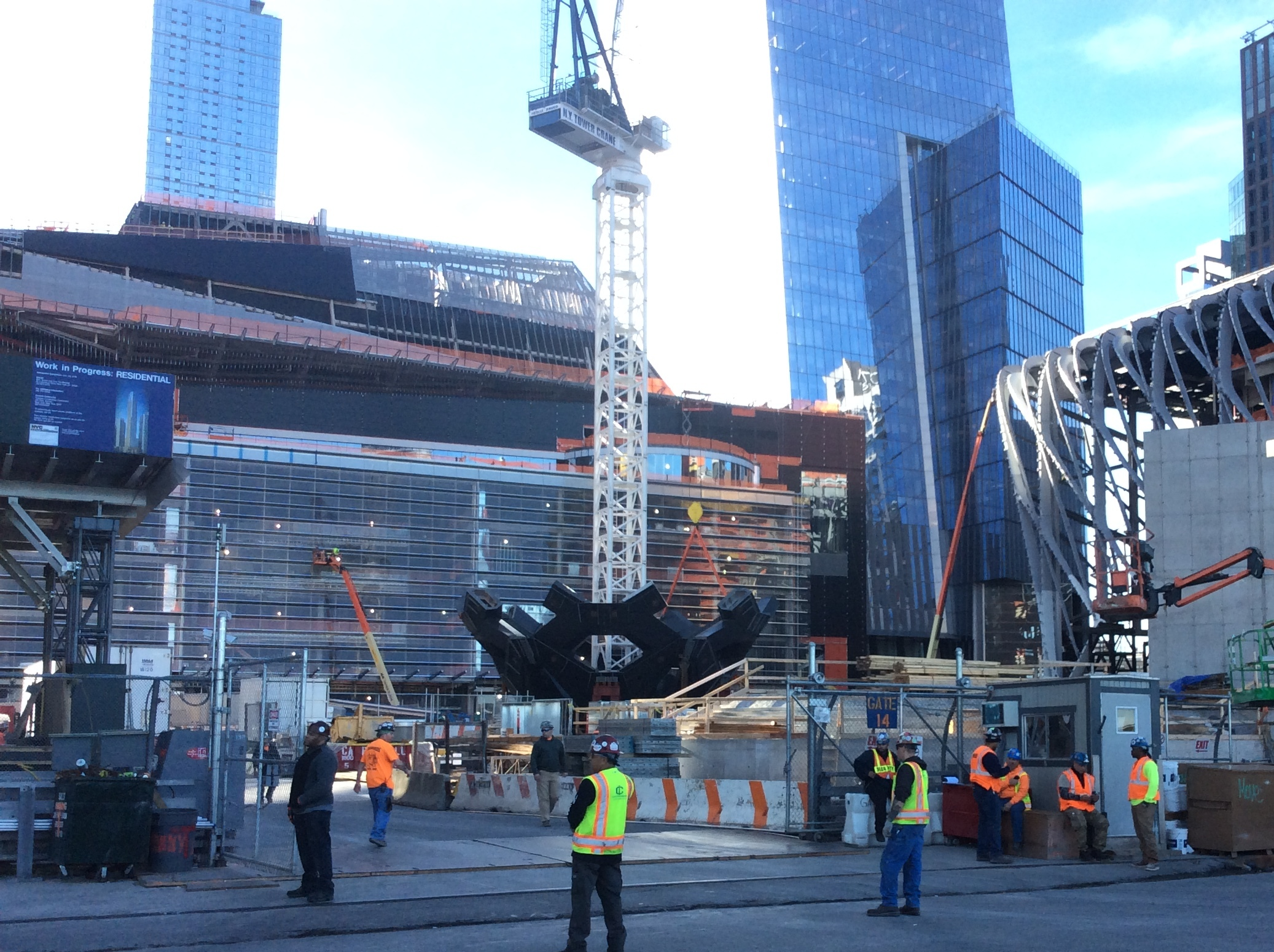
Beginning of construction, May 2017

Map of buildings and structures at Hudson Yards. Zoom the map and click on points for more details.

In an interview with Fortune magazine, Ross said that he "wanted to commission something transformational, monumental", which led to the concept for Vessel. Ross looked to five unnamed artists, renowned for designing similar plazas, and requested in-depth proposals. After rejecting the plans, a colleague introduced Ross to Heatherwick. Six weeks later Ross accepted Heatherwick's proposal because it "had everything I wanted". In an interview with designboom, Heatherwick said his design came from a childhood experience of falling "in love with an old discarded flight of wooden stairs outside a local building site". Heatherwick's commissioning was reported in October 2013.

The concept of Vessel was presented to the public on September 14, 2016, in an event attended by hundreds of people including New York City Mayor Bill de Blasio. Hosted by Anderson Cooper, the event featured a performance from the Alvin Ailey American Dance Theater that evoked the interlocking design of Vessel's staircases.

In April 2017, the first major piece of the sculpture was installed at Hudson Yards. Construction started on April 18 with the installation of the first 10 pieces of the 75-piece structure. It was projected for completion in the spring of 2019, with the other 65 pieces arriving in five batches. The structure topped out in December 2017. In October 2018, it was announced that the opening of Vessel had been scheduled for March 15, 2019, and that tickets to enter the structure would become available in February. By January 2019, Hudson Yards officials were soliciting public suggestions for a rename of Vessel. Though the structure had no official name, the Hudson Yards website called it the "Hudson Yards Staircase". Vessel opened as scheduled on March 15, 2019.

Hudson Yards initially claimed to own any photo taken of Vessel. This drew criticism, not least because the developers had been given $4.5 billion of public money, and Hudson Yards quickly stopped claiming to own others' photos of Vessel. Starting in 2025, Vessel was illuminated at night during the winter holiday season.

=== Suicides ===
On February 1, 2020, a 19-year-old man jumped from the sixth floor of the structure and died, apparently the first such incident involving Vessel. On December 22, 2020, a 24-year-old woman jumped from the top of the structure and also died. Less than a month later, on January 11, 2021, a 21-year-old man jumped from Vessel. Following this third death, the structure was indefinitely closed while the Related Companies consulted with experts on a strategy to prevent suicides. Residents of the surrounding neighborhoods hired a suicide prevention expert, who suggested adding netting or raising the glass barriers. However, no changes were ultimately made to the barriers.

Vessel was reopened at the end of May 2021, but all visitors were required to be accompanied by at least one other person. In addition, after the first hour of each day, all visitors older than five years old had to pay $10 for a ticket. Revenue from ticket sales was to fund safety upgrades. Two months later, on July 29, 2021, a 14-year-old boy jumped to his death while he was with his family. After this fourth death, Vessel was again closed indefinitely. Stephen Ross said he was considering closing the structure permanently. By August 2022, Hudson Yards officials were testing safety nets around Vessel in preparation for the structure's possible reopening. After full-height steel mesh nets were installed on each level, news media reported in early 2024 that Vessel would reopen later that year, though the top level would remain closed. On October 21, 2024, Vessel reopened; initially, only the lowest two levels and parts of the upper levels were open to the public.

== Reception ==
Aerial video

Fortune writer Shawn Tully called Vessel "Manhattan's answer to the Eiffel Tower", a sentiment echoed by CNN reporter Tiffany Ap. Elle Decor writer Kelsey Kloss compared Vessel to an M. C. Escher drawing. Several commentators have referred to the structure as the Giant Shawarma. Speaking about the structure's design process, Heatherwick said, "We had to think of what could act as the role of a landmarker. Something that could help give character and particularity to the space."

David Colon of Gothamist called Vessel "a bold addition to the city's landscape". Public Art Fund president Susan Freedman liked the renderings for Vessel but called it "a leap of faith in terms of scale". She said there might be too much demand for Vessel, especially considering the structure's proximity to the High Line. Ted Loos of The New York Times said the sculpture, while a "stairway to nowhere" in the utilitarian sense, served as an "exclamation point" to the nearby northern terminus of the High Line.

New York Times architecture critic Michael Kimmelman called Vessel's exterior "gaudy" and criticized Hudson Yards more generally as a "gated community" that lacked real public space. CityLab's Feargus O'Sullivan called Vessel, along with Heatherwick's other numerous billionaire-funded developments and architectural projects, "a gaudy monument to being only ever-so-slightly free." Some called it a "piece of junk" and an "eyesore", and contrasted it negatively to Cloud Gate, also known as The Bean, in Millennium Park, Chicago. Blair Kamin of the Chicago Tribune called it "willful and contrived".

Vessel was initially largely inaccessible for wheelchair users. It consisted mainly of stairs, with only a single elevator to connect one of the sets of landings, and drew protests from disability-rights groups outside the structure. To protest the inaccessibility of the structure, the artist Finnegan Shannon set up a lounge that could only be accessed by signing an agreement to not travel above the structure's ground level. The United States Department of Justice filed a complaint alleging that because of the number of separate landings within Vessel, most of the structure was not compliant with the Americans with Disabilities Act, except for the portions directly outside the elevator. Furthermore, elevator stops on the fifth and seventh stories or mezzanines were sometimes skipped due to overcrowding concerns. In December 2019, Related Companies and Vessel operator ERY Vessel LLC reached an agreement with the Department of Justice to increase accessibility to the structure by adding wheelchair lifts and retaining elevator access to all levels.

== Gallery ==
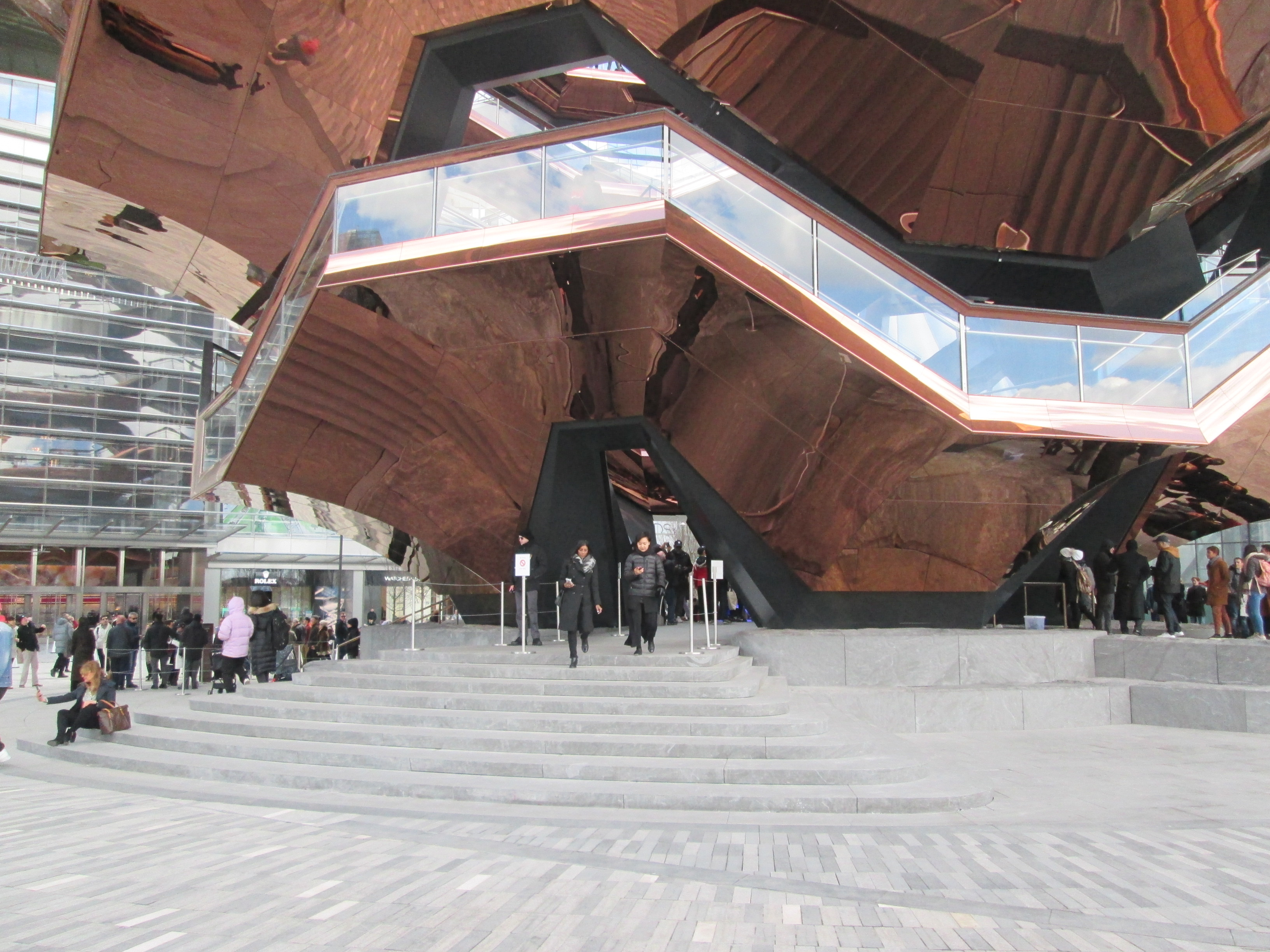
Entrance

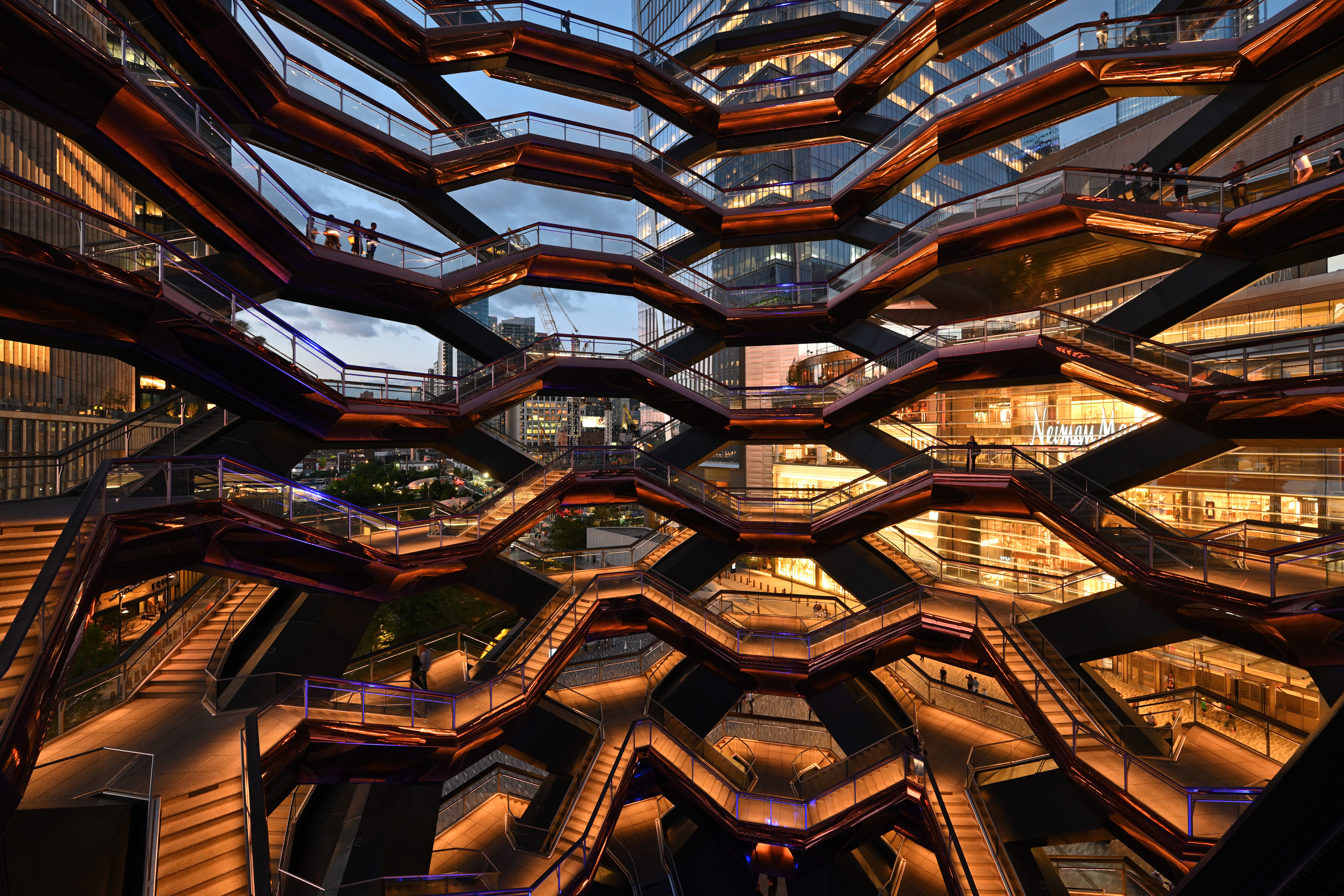
View from inside

View from the top

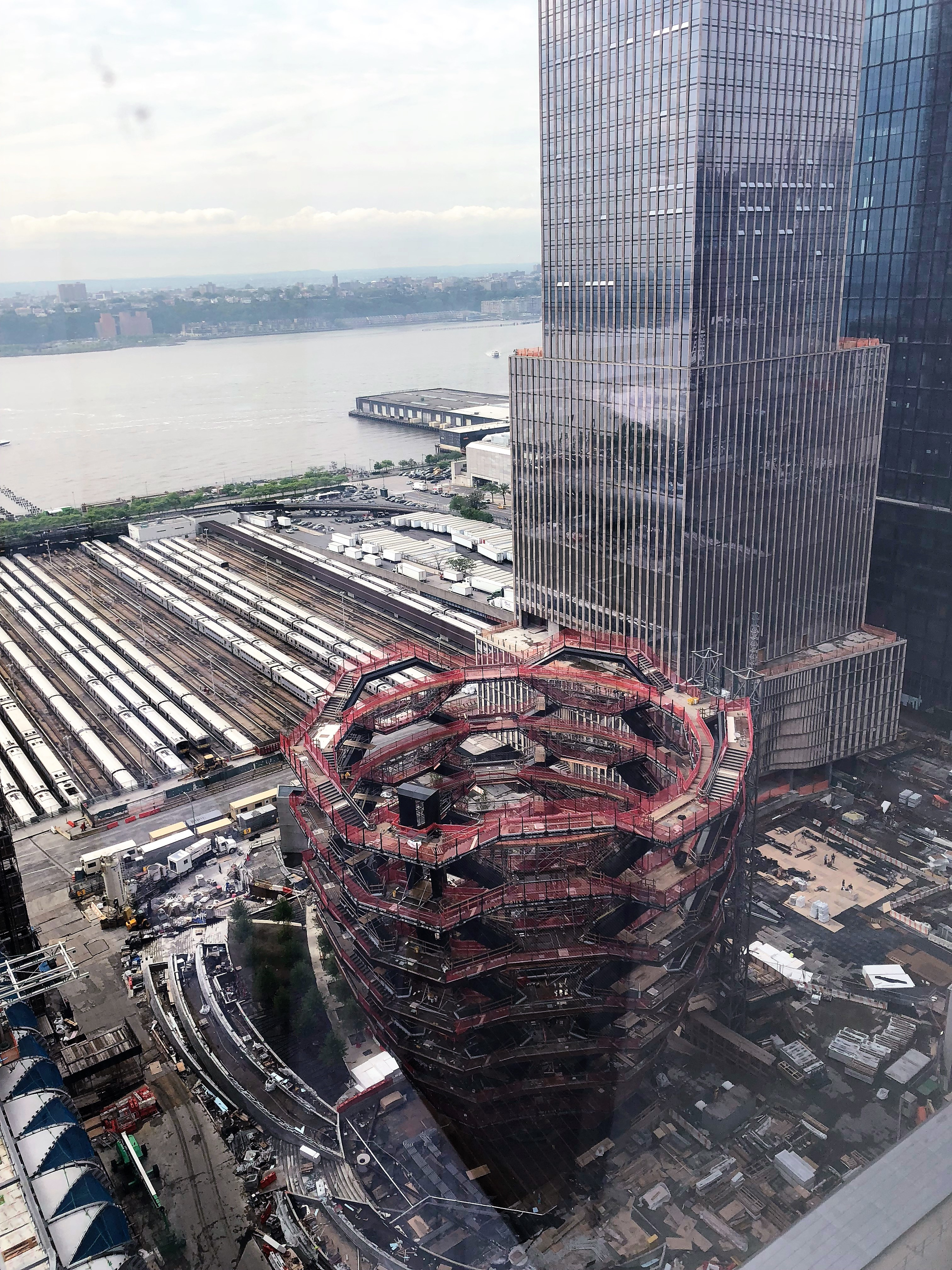
Aerial view

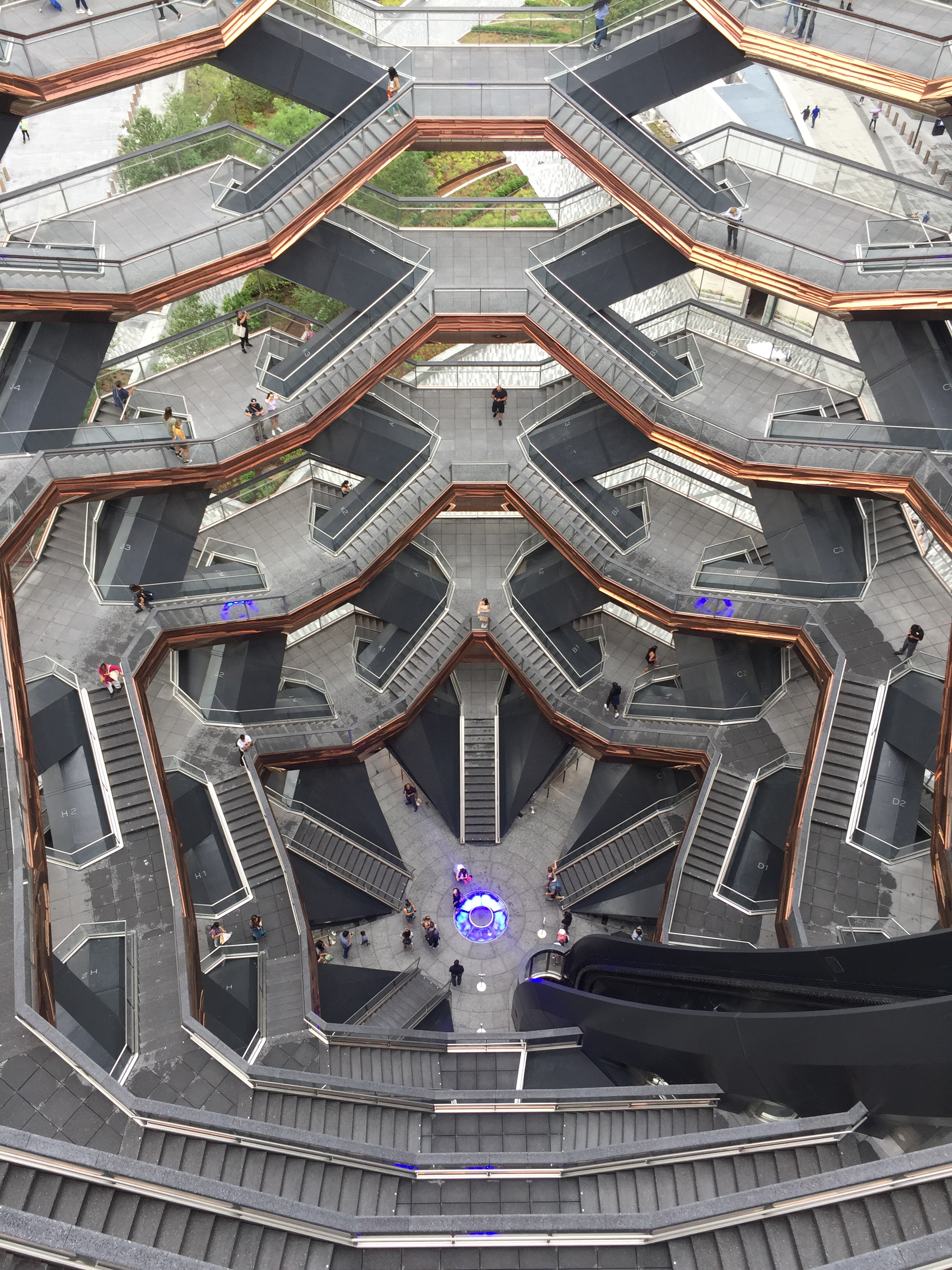
Top-down view

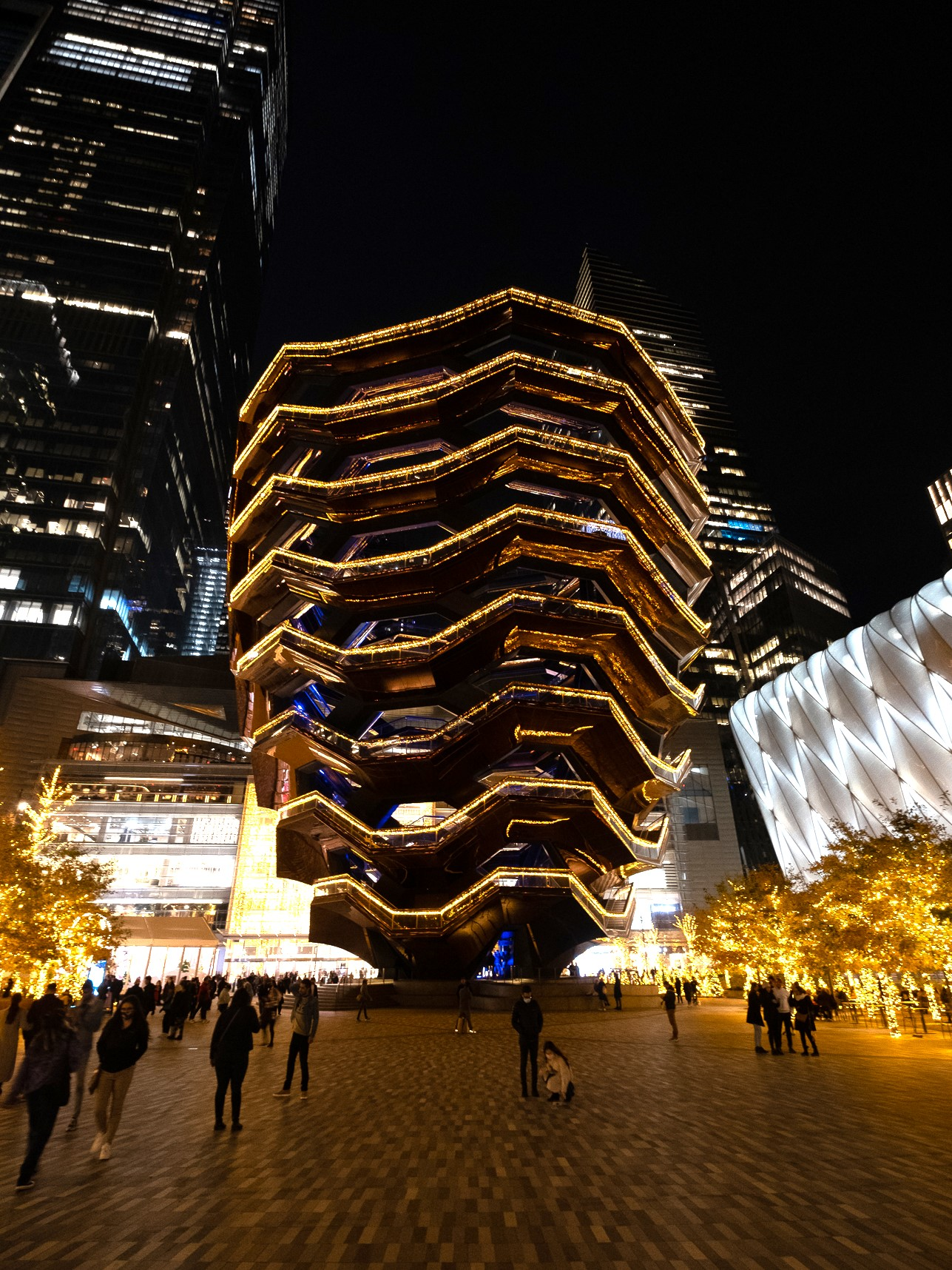
Vessel at night during the 2021 holiday season
