= Citygarden =

Urban park and sculpture garden in St. Louis, Missouri

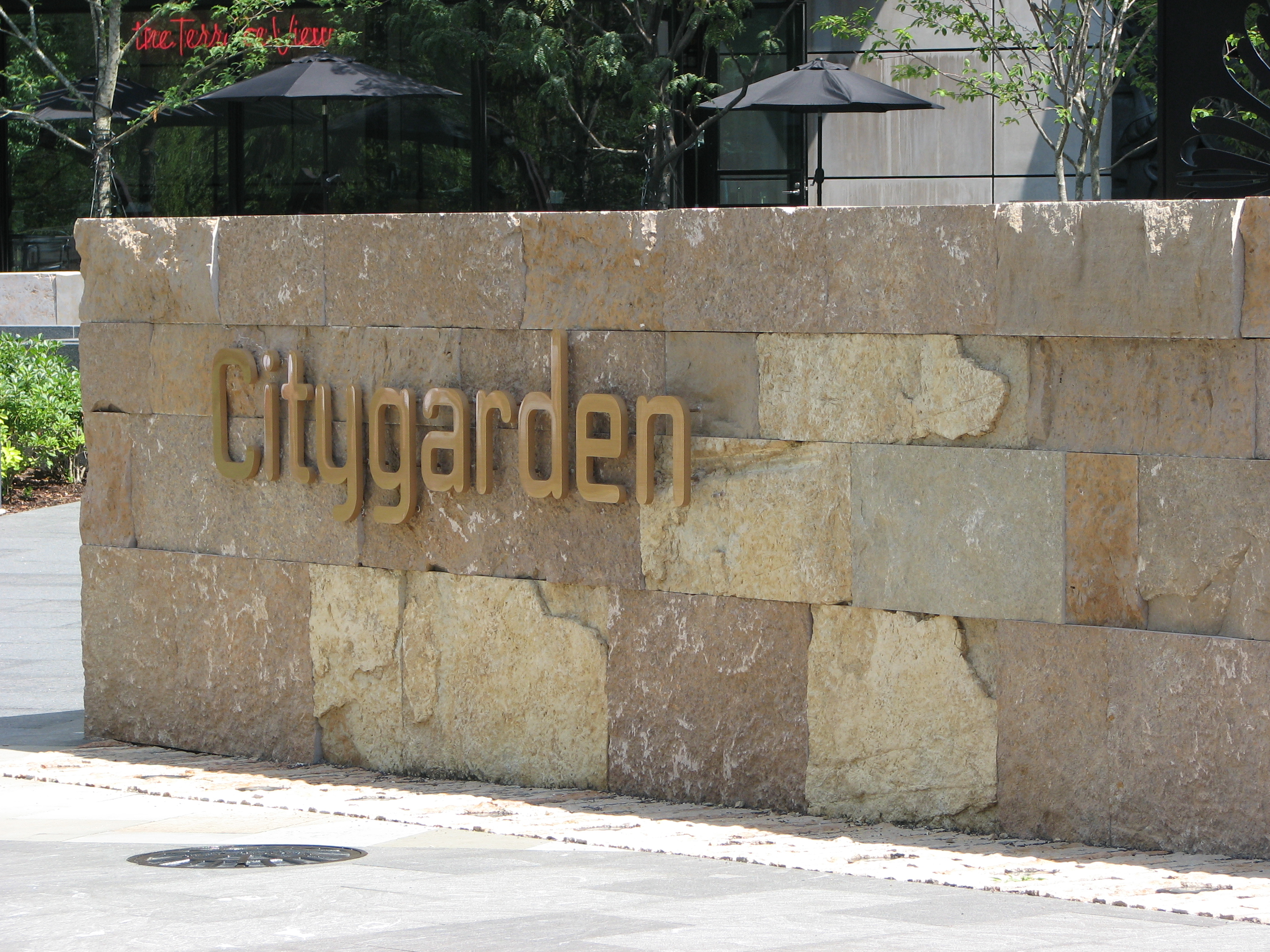
- The restaurant building is visible behind this sign for Citygarden.
- Interactive map of Citygarden
- Type: Urban park and sculpture garden
- Location: Between Eighth, Tenth, Chestnut, and Market streets, St. Louis, Missouri, United States
- Coordinates: 38.627°N 90.194°W
- Area: 2.9 acres (1.2 ha)
- Created: July 1, 2009
- Operator: Gateway Foundation
- Visitors: 1,000,000+ (estimated)
- Status: Open year round
- Public transit: MetroBus; Red Blue; At 8th & Pine station
- Website: citygardenstl.org

Citygarden is an urban park and sculpture garden in St. Louis, Missouri owned by the City of St. Louis but maintained by the Gateway Foundation. It is located between Eighth, Tenth, Market, and Chestnut streets, in the city's "Gateway Mall" area. Before being converted to a garden and park, the site comprised two empty blocks of grass. Citygarden was dedicated on June 30, 2009, and opened one day later, on July 1, 2009.

Citygarden is 2.9 acres (1.2 ha) in size—occupying two square city blocks—and cost US$30 million to develop. St. Louis' Gateway Foundation, a not-for-profit organization supporting public art, funded the design and construction of the garden. While the city owns the land on which Citygarden was developed, the foundation owns the statues and covers all park maintenance costs except water and electricity. The Gateway Foundation is also in charge of providing additional security for the garden.

There is no admission fee for visitors of Citygarden, which is located close to St. Louis' Gateway Arch and Busch Stadium. The park is open year-round and complies with the Americans with Disabilities Act of 1990.

== History ==
Public art is not new to the Gateway Mall. In 1940, a large Carl Milles work was installed outside St. Louis Union Station. This later became one end of the mall when it was created in the 1960s, with the Gateway Arch on the other end. In 1982, Richard Serra's Twain—a sculpture comprising eight large plates of weathering steel—was installed on the 1.14 acres (0.46 ha) block immediately west of Citygarden, creating Serra Sculpture Park.

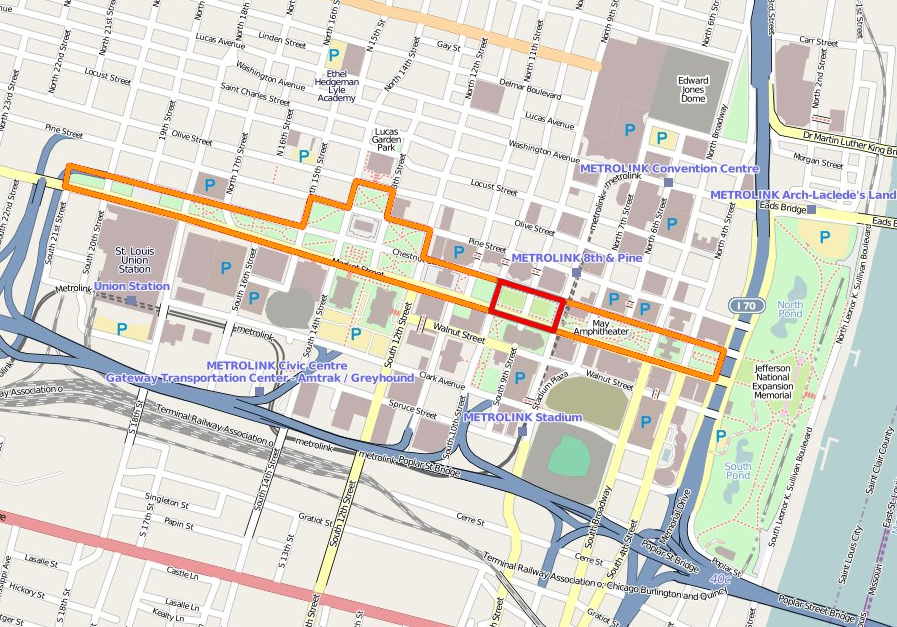
In this map of downtown St. Louis, the Gateway Mall is outlined in orange and Citygarden in red.

In the late 1990s, a group of St. Louis residents drew up a plan for a revitalized downtown, which included a sculpture garden at the same two blocks where Citygarden is located. That plan was not immediately realized, but in 2006, the City of St. Louis asked the Gateway Foundation to prepare a master plan for the entire Gateway Mall strip. In early 2007, the foundation sponsored a competition, soliciting designs for the planned project; Nelson Byrd Woltz Landscape Architects, a Charlottesville, Virginia landscape architecture firm, was the winner. The partnership to develop Citygarden was announced in June 2007. The project was initially proposed to the St. Louis Preservation Board in October 2007, while development of the land began in April 2008. Over 250,000 people visited Citygarden before Christmas, 2009, a figure that has since risen to an estimated one million or more. However, because Citygarden has no gates, there is no official visitor count.

I'm already hearing from CEOs about how much they love this garden. With one stroke, Citygarden has made downtown far more attractive as a place to do business and as a place to live, too, because downtown's 12,000 residents suddenly have one of the coolest urban parks in the country in their backyard.

— St. Louis Mayor Francis G. Slay, at the June 30, 2009 dedication of Citygarden

At the dedication of Citygarden, Mayor of St. Louis Francis G. Slay praised the project, saying, "This new garden is immediately taking its place among the great cultural attractions of St. Louis for residents and visitors alike. It's dazzling, and its complete openness in the heart of downtown makes it unique in the country." In front of local and state officials, as well as the media, Slay told workers at the park's control center to turn on the fountains and tear down the construction fence. On the opening day of Citygarden, city officials asked an ice cream truck to park near the garden to attract tourists, but many visitors arrived at the park regardless.

A celebration for Citygarden's one-year anniversary was held on July 10, 2010. The festivities included a flamingo parade—meant to "express the irreverent and whimsical spirit of the garden," said park spokesperson Paul Wagman.

=== Impact ===
According to one city development leader, Citygarden has prompted many people to visit downtown St. Louis. The executive of a local community improvement organization said the garden has also contributed to the city's economy. In addition, the popularity of Citygarden has led to renewed interest in renovating the 16-block Gateway Mall. Slay said, "By setting the bar so high, it gives us reason to hope that the entire Gateway Mall will eventually fulfill the dreams that civic planners have had for it for the better part of a century. The Mall can be a wonderful, multi-faceted cultural and recreational space for our City and the region."

Rocco Landesman, chairperson of the National Endowment for the Arts, has used Citygarden as an example of a successful foundation-funded art venture. Landesman—a former resident of St. Louis—said that such projects can help urban areas economically, but they cannot be funded solely by the federal government, thus requiring assistance from both the private sector and foundations. Michael Van Valkenburgh, principal of a Brooklyn landscape architecture firm, said he was drawn to St. Louis partly because of Citygarden's design and success. Van Valkenburgh was selected in 2010 to renovate the grounds of the Gateway Arch.

== Sculptures ==
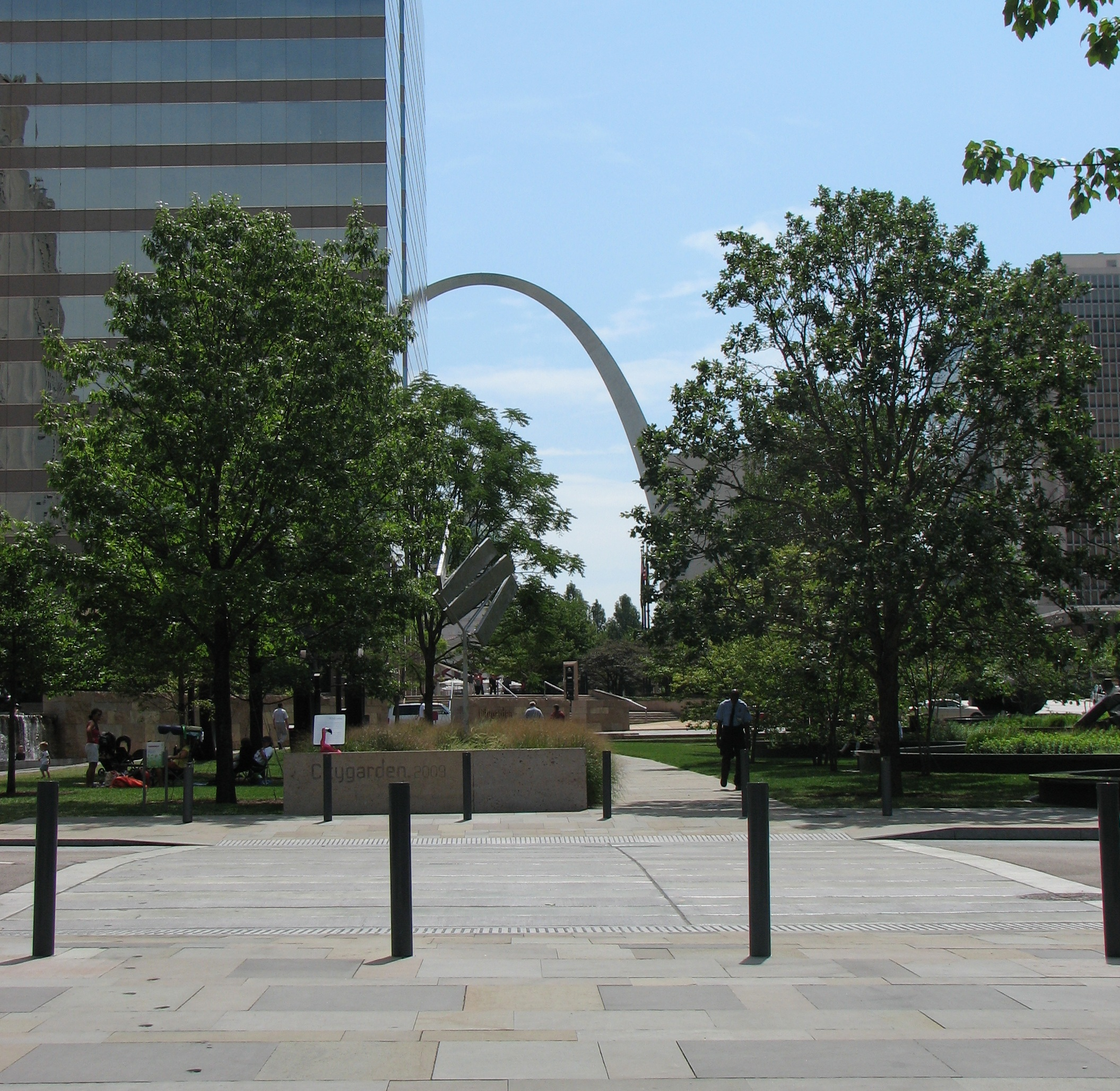
As one looks east across Ninth Street, the Gateway Arch is visible past Citygarden.

The park was designed so larger works of art rest on wide lawns, while smaller spaces are reserved for more private areas. It is home to 29 sculptures, some of which were created by Fernand Léger, Keith Haring, Aristide Maillol, Laura Ford, Tony Smith, Jim Dine, Kan Yasuda, Bernar Venet, Mark di Suvero, Niki de Saint Phalle, Tom Otterness, Tom Claassen, Jack Youngerman, Ju Ming, Jean-Michel Folon, Mimmo Paladino, Jonathan Clarke, Donald Baechler, and Martin Puryear. One statue, by Igor Mitoraj, features a large bronze head lying on its side, while works by Julian Opie comprise digital screens displaying walking people. Park visitors are allowed to touch the sculptures and even walk inside them. This means, however, that some of the works require more frequent maintenance, such as re-waxing. The sculptures range in medium from various metals—bronze, stainless steel, and cast aluminum—fiberglass and even polyester. On September 20, 2011, a 9-foot (2.7 m) aluminum sculpture of a bodiless pink suit, by Erwin Wurm and titled Big Suit, was installed in the garden.

The Gateway Foundation already owned two of the two dozen pieces prior to Citygarden's creation, and it purchased the remaining number between 2006 and 2009. The organization has not revealed the cost of acquiring the sculptures, an amount not included in the $30 million; however, it is estimated that the collection is worth around $12 million, if not more. The garden has received criticism from those who think that 24 sculptures is too many in such a small space.

=== Selected works ===
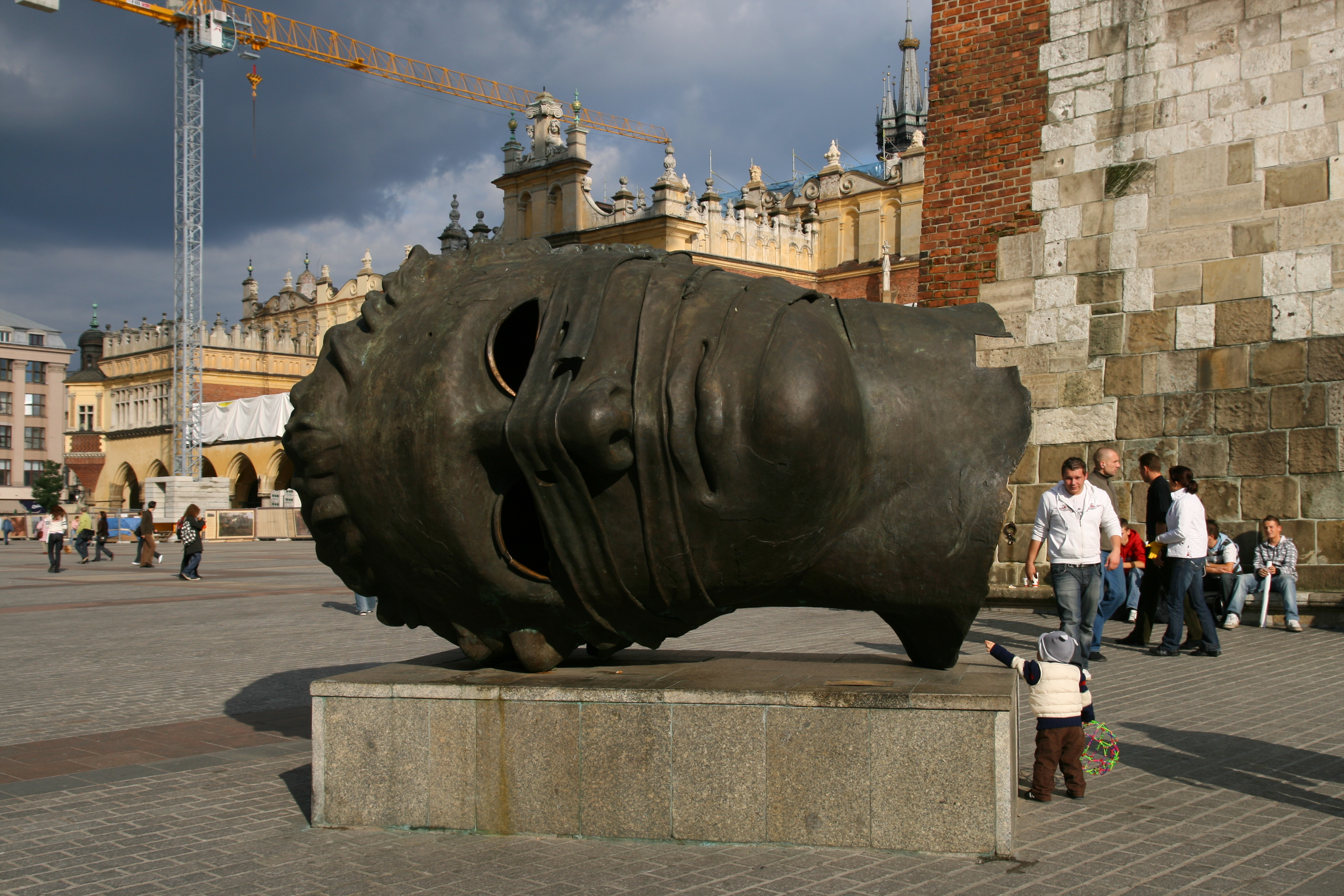
Eros Bendato (1999), by Igor Mitoraj, on exhibition in Kraków, Poland.

- 2 Arcs x 4 and 230.5 Degree Arc x 5 (1999) comprise a series of three steel sculptures by Bernar Venet. One sculpture consists of five steel beams bent into a 230.5-degree arc, another arc is 232.5 degrees, and the last is 235.5 degrees.
- Big White Gloves, Big Four Wheels (2009) is a statue of Pinocchio by Jim Dine.
- Eros Bendato ("Eros Bound"; 1999) is a large bronze head by sculptor Igor Mitoraj. Located on the corner of Eighth and Market streets, the statue lays sideways on a slanted granite circle, which is covered by a steady stream of water.
- Femmes au perroquet ("Women with parrot"; 1952) is a bronze relief situated on the wall of the restaurant building. Created by the Cubist artist Fernand Léger, this work features a group of women with a parakeet.
- Four Rectangles Oblique IV (1979) is a kinetic sculpture by George Rickey.
- La Rivière ("The River"; 1938–1943), by Aristide Maillol, depicts a nude woman washing her hair. It is located in the basin outside the restaurant building. Another version of this sculpture can be found at New York City's Museum of Modern Art.
- This is Bruce and Sarah Walking (2007) is an LED panel that displays two people walking. The work, created by Julian Opie, is located next to Tenth Street. Another version of the installation, depicting walkers "Julian" and "Kiera", is located in another part of Citygarden.
- Untitled (Two Rabbits) (2004), by Tom Claassen, consists of two rabbits cast in bronze and then painted white.
- Voyage (1999), by Jean-Michel Folon, depicts a boat sitting amid a pool of water. The boat has two passengers: a man with a hat—the everyman—on one end, and a sleeping cat on the other end.
- Zenit (1999) is a bronze horse sculpted by Mimmo Paladino. Instead of a rider, the horse carries a small stellated dodecahedron on its back.

== Features ==
The challenge and the opportunity was not just to make a sculpture garden, but a place for the public. The challenge was what kind of armature or framework to use to create both a grandness of scope and the intimacy necessary for the installation of individual works of sculpture. Although the site was pretty blank, we looked into its history, its broader context. We ended up using the great rivers that define the region to structure the design conceptually. ... It's really a hybrid landscape. It's some combination of a city park and a sculpture garden. ... It has no limits. We wanted to make this site accessible to everybody. ... And one of our intentions was literally to create a diversity of spaces and places because we felt not only would that accommodate this range of sculpture, it would accommodate a great range of people.

— Warren T. Byrd of Nelson Byrd Woltz Landscape Architects

Citygarden is not enclosed from the street and can be entered from any direction. The park includes six rain gardens, a 102-fountain "spray plaza" in which children can play, as well as a 180 feet (55 m)-long pool with a 6-foot (1.8 m)-tall waterfall. The fountain's water is recycled, and filtered rainwater is also used. A low, winding, 1,110-foot (340 m)-long, granite-topped "meander wall" runs through the park's southern half and acts as seating for visitors. In the northern half, a 550-foot (170 m)-long curved wall of yellow Missouri limestone stretches across the property. A 16-foot (4.9 m) LED video screen is on the wall; it displays movies and artworks, as well as some baseball games—including the 2009 Major League Baseball All-Star Game. In October 2009, two films—"The Way Things Go" by Peter Fischli & David Weiss, and Gordon Matta-Clark's "Conical Intersect"—were featured on the video wall, running a total of 50 minutes. Previously, the video wall had displayed a series of nine short films focused on humor and the absurdity of life. The Contemporary Art Museum St. Louis, Mildred Lane Kemper Art Museum at Washington University in St. Louis, Pulitzer Arts Foundation, and Saint Louis Art Museum take turns updating the shows at each quarter.

Visitors to Citygarden can listen to an audio tour by dialing a special number on their mobile phones. The tour is narrated by prominent St. Louis residents, including former St. Louis Cardinals player Ozzie Smith and St. Louis Symphony Orchestra director David Robertson, as well as Jackie Joyner-Kersee, John Ashcroft, Jenna Fischer, and Kurt Warner, with over twenty narrators in all.

=== Design ===
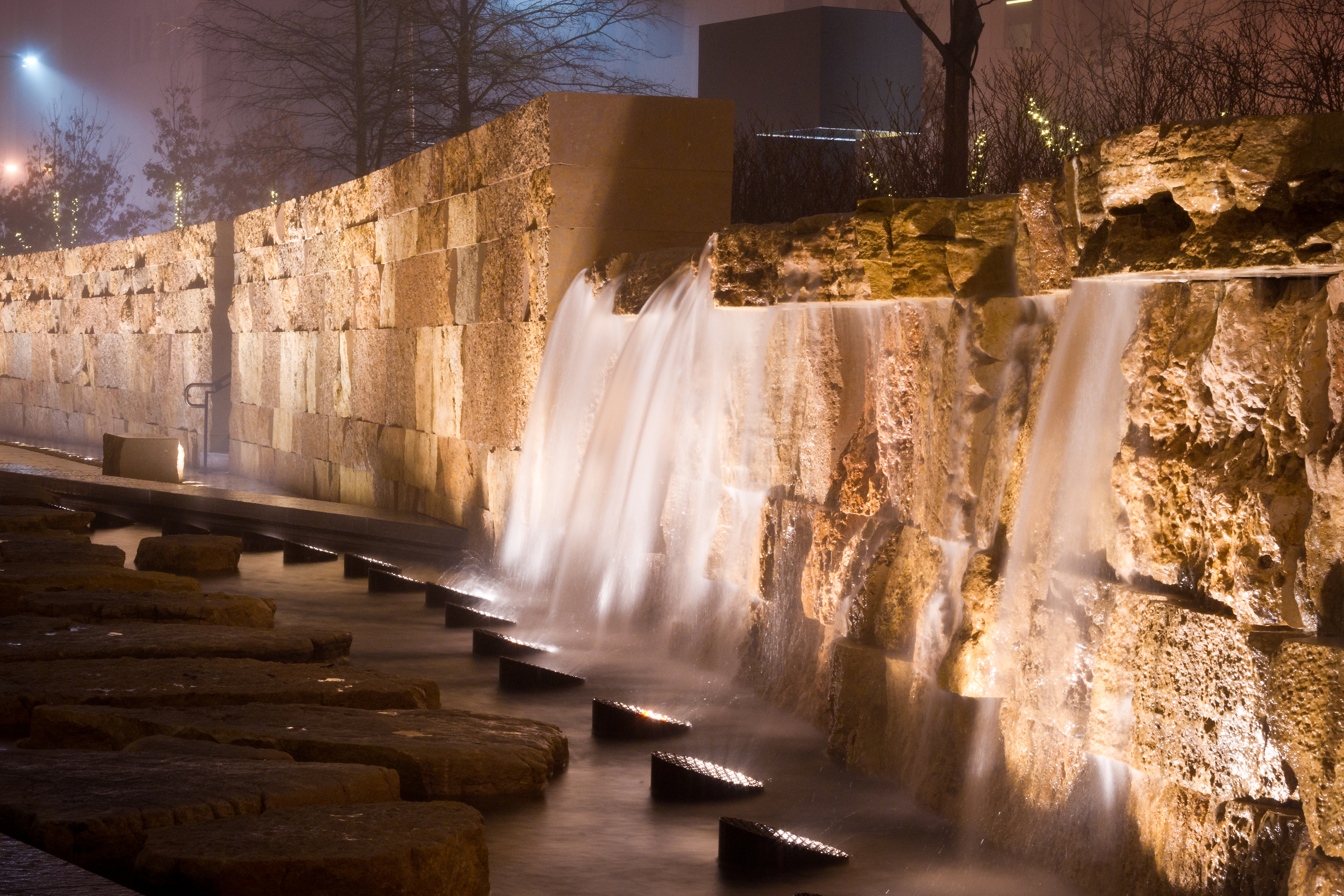
A waterfall flows down the park's wall of Missouri limestone.

The garden also includes Ginkgo biloba trees, native plants, and spacious sidewalks, features that Warren Byrd of Nelson Byrd Woltz Landscape Architects said could be adapted by other sections of the Gateway Mall. Originally, the Citygarden site had an elevation of 6 feet (1.8 m), but architects increased it to 10 feet (3.0 m) in certain areas, placing the restaurant and maintenance shed on the higher ground.

The park is divided into three horizontal sections, and architects considered the rivers and other natural characteristics of the St. Louis area when designing the park. The northern limestone wall represents the Mississippi River bluffs, while the southern snaking meander wall stands is inspired by the region's waterways. Between the two zones are the rain gardens, larger trees, and larger sculptures, an area that meant to represent a floodplain. The main paths of the park were plotted to match the locations of alleyways that park designers saw in a 1916 Sanborn map.

Citygarden's plants, including various grasses and wildflowers, were selected by the Missouri Botanical Garden. Large shade plants were chosen to provide relief in warm and humid weather. At the time of its opening, Citygarden comprised a total of 240 trees, 1,100 shrubs, 4,000 perennials, 8,000 bulbs, and 13,000 groundcovers. A garden spokesperson later said that hungry rabbits have forced workers to alter some of the plant choices.

== Recognition ==
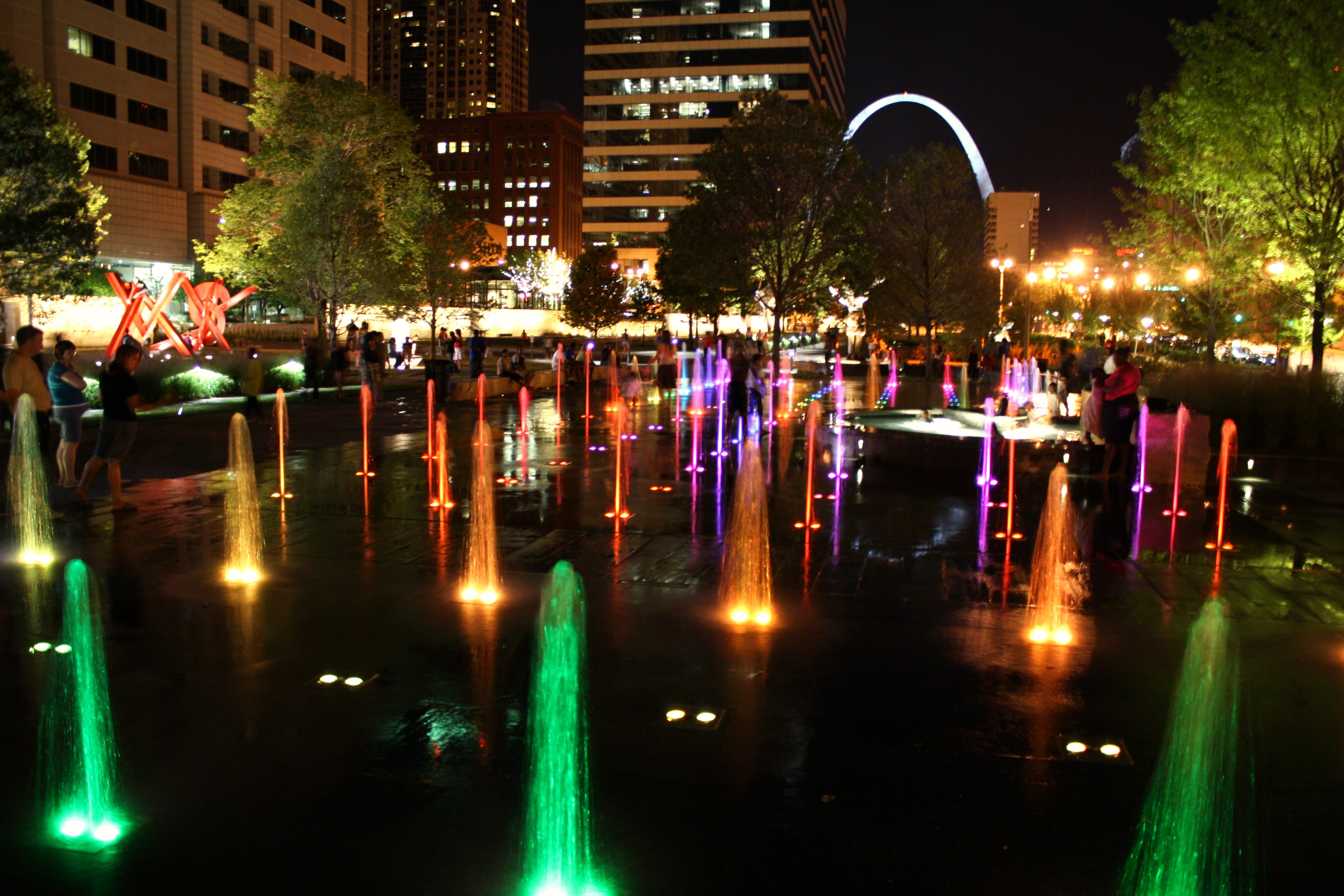
The 102 jets in Citygarden's spray plaza are colorfully illuminated at night.

On October 8, 2009, the chairman of the board of the Gateway Foundation was given the St. Louis Award for his part in Citygarden's development. Upon receiving the award, Peter Fischer—whose parents launched the foundation in 1986—called for more public spaces similar to Citygarden. "If Citygarden's design really is world class, then it has set the standard for the development of the rest of the [Gateway Mall]. We want great and brilliant design for our public places," he said. The St. Louis Award recognizes a "resident of metropolitan St. Louis who, during the preceding year, has contributed the most outstanding service for its development."

In early 2011, Citygarden was named one of five finalists for the Urban Land Institute Amanda Burden Urban Open Space Award. The award, named after its creator, is given to a public open space that has contributed to its surrounding community. Citygarden competed for the $10,000 prize against Portland, Oregon's Director Park and Jamison Square, as well as Discovery Green and the Raymond and Susan Brochstein Pavilion of Houston, Texas. The institute said that Citygarden "draws on St. Louis' chief natural feature—its rivers ... has attracted diverse users, catalyzed nearby development, and changed perceptions of downtown. Situated on two blocks of the underutilized Gateway Mall, the active sculpture garden has drawn an estimated one million visitors since its opening." On May 19, 2011, the Urban Land Institute announced Citygarden as the winner of the award at a ceremony in Phoenix, Arizona. In a statement, Slay said, "This is a really wonderful honor for the City of St. Louis and for the Gateway Foundation. ULI chose Citygarden from among 48 applicants across the country. The decision will bring flattering and well-deserved national attention both to the garden and to the City of St. Louis." The award was accepted in Phoenix by Rodney Crim, director of the St. Louis Development Corporation, on behalf of the city and the Gateway Foundation.

In September 2011, the American Society of Landscape Architects (ASLA) announced the results of its 2011 Professional Awards. Citygarden was named as one of eight recipients of an Honor Award in the ASLA's "General Design" category.

CityGarden is the final location on the Let's Roam Saint Louis Architectural Scavenger Hunt.

== Dining ==
=== Terrace View ===
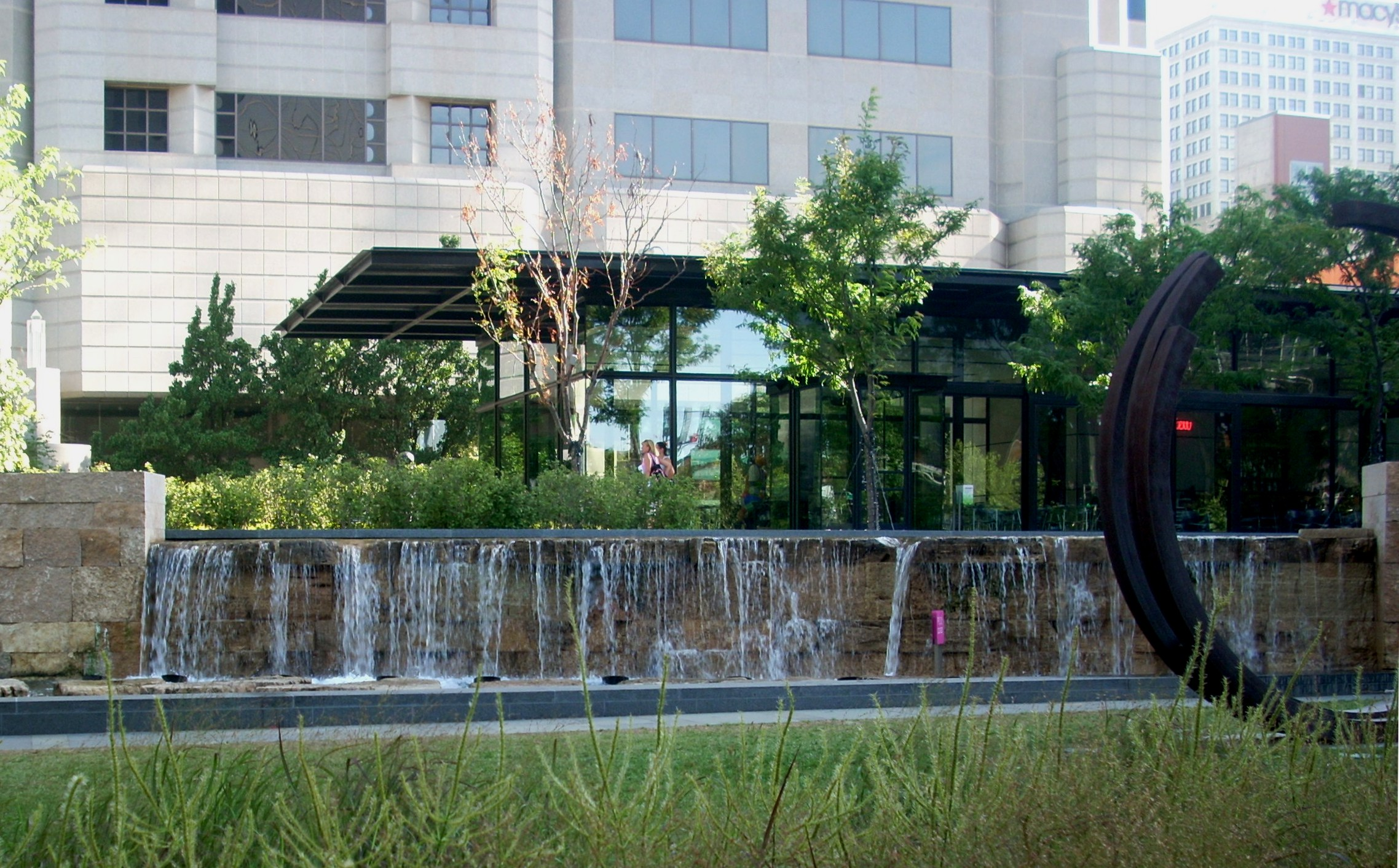
The restaurant building, once home to the Terrace View and now to Joe's Chili Bowl, is elevated above the rest of the park.

The Terrace View was a restaurant and café located in Citygarden. Operated by local restaurateur Jim Fiala, the Terrace View opened on August 19, 2009 with Chris Bork as chef. At the time of its opening, Fiala estimated the eatery would produce between $600,000 and $800,000 in revenue each year. The Terrace View employed about 30 workers.

The 3,000-square-foot (280 m^{2}) Terrace View building was designed by Philip Durham of Studio Durham Architects. It has three glass walls that face the garden and is located near the intersection of Eighth and Chestnut streets. Durham called his design a "Miesian glass box", similar to the style of Ludwig Mies van der Rohe. The building's roof—as well as the roof of maintenance building—is covered with Sedum species, meant to decrease energy costs. Inside, Niki de Saint Phalle's sculpture Adam and Eve sat in the middle of the dining floor.

The restaurant served breakfast, lunch, and dinner. With both indoor and outdoor seating, the Terrace View accommodated up to 120 patrons and focused on dishes created locally—within 150 miles (240 km) of its location—as well as Italian and French cuisine. In December 2010, Terrace View chef Nick Cox narrowed the original Mediterranean-themed menu, focusing more on Northern Italian cuisine. Called "Acero on the Terrace" after Fiala's Acero restaurant in Maplewood, Missouri, the menu retained dishes made from locally grown produce, including the "50-Mile Salad"—composed of ingredients from within 50 miles (80 km) of the Terrace View.

Fiala had been referred to the Gateway Foundation by the president of a local catering company, and the foundation later asked him to run the Terrace View. A foundation spokesperson said that the "Gateway Foundation board sorted through a lot of different candidates, and they were thrilled to find one who was perfect." Fiala had wanted to open the Terrace View before the 2009 All-Star Game, but was forced to delay in order to settle contracts and have a liquor license approved. The establishment was originally scheduled to open on July 1, the same day as Citygarden's opening and two weeks before the game.

In September 2011, Fiala announced he would not renew the Terrace View's lease on the building in Citygarden. After switching to a weekday-lunch-only schedule for the remainder of 2011, the restaurant closed at the end of the year. Fiala attributed the closure to low profitability due to a lack of dinner customers, though he said lunch business was "fine". The restaurant's departure sparked speculation on a possible replacement, including the possibility of St. Louis-born restaurateur Danny Meyer opening a Shake Shack store in Citygarden, but the building remained unoccupied at the beginning of 2012.

=== Death in the Afternoon ===
Death in the Afternoon opened in the vacated by Joe's Chili Bowl space. According to restaurant's website "Death in the Afternoon is a concept built around St. Louis and eating well no matter what time of day. Locally sourced ingredients are assembled by talented chefs to make your brunch, lunch or dinner something unique and fun."

Two roughly square lots are shown on map with a light grey background. Buildings are colored brown; plantings, green; water features, blue; and walking paths, off-white.|In this map of Citygarden, the arcing golden limestone wall divides the park's northern zone, while the dark meander wall snakes through the southern zone. Ninth Street separates the two blocks on which the garden is located

== See also ==
- High Line
- Laumeier Sculpture Park
- Millennium Park
