= Fialka (surname) =

Fialka (feminine: Fialková) is a Czech surname. Fiałka is a Polish surname. Fialka is a diminutive of the name Fiala, but it also means 'violet' (any plant of the genus Viola). Notable people with the surname include:

- Gerry Fialka (born 1953), American filmmaker
- Karel Fialka (born c. 1950s), British musician
- Kazimierz Fiałka (1907–1970), Polish long-distance runner
- Ladislav Fialka (1931–1991), Czech mime
- Olga Fialka (1848–1930), Austrian-Czech artist
