= Fjolla =

- Gender: Female

Origin
- Meaning: Snowflake
- Region of origin: Balkans

Fjolla (pronounced Fee-olla) is an Albanian female given name which means "snowflake". It is also used as a common surname in Albania and Kosovo. The name is mostly used in Kosovo and surname in Albania. Notable people with the name include:

- Fjolla Kelmendi (born 1990), Kosovar judoka
- Fjolla Shala (born 1993), Kosovar footballer

== See also ==
- Fiola
