= Martin Gründling =

Slovak ice hockey player

- Born: February 13, 1987 (age 39) Holíč, Czechoslovakia
- Height: 1.89 m (6 ft 2 in)
- Weight: 95 kg (209 lb; 14 st 13 lb)
- Position: Defence
- Shoots: Left
- Slovak team Former teams: MHk 32 Liptovský Mikuláš; HK 36 Skalica; HC Karlovy Vary; Arystan Temirtau; HC '05 Banská Bystrica
- Playing career: 2005–present

Martin Gründling (born February 13, 1987, in Holíč) is a Slovak professional ice hockey player who currently plays for MHk 32 Liptovský Mikuláš in the Slovak Extraliga.

Gründling has previously played in the Slovak Extraliga for HK 36 Skalica and HC '05 Banská Bystrica, as well as the Czech Extraliga for HC Karlovy Vary and in the Kazakhstan Hockey Championship league for Arystan Temirtau.
