= Matti Koistinen =

Finnish ice hockey player

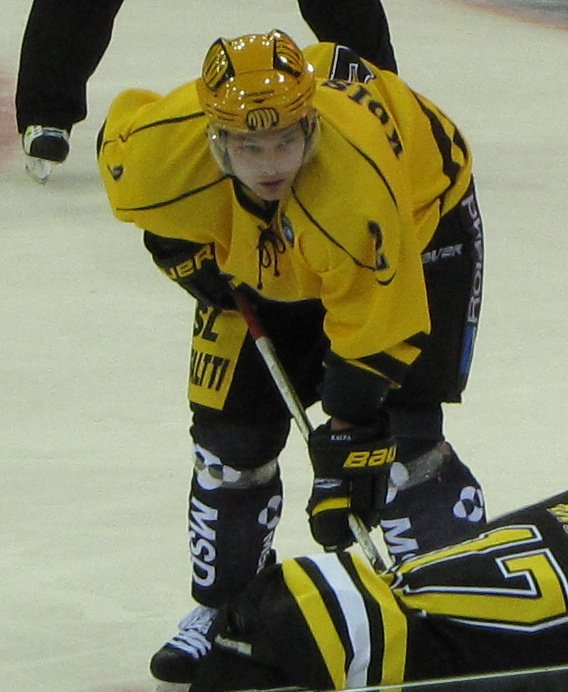
- Born: January 18, 1986 (age 40) Outokumpu, Finland
- Height: 5 ft 11 in (180 cm)
- Weight: 194 lb (88 kg; 13 st 12 lb)
- Position: Defence
- Shoots: Left
- SM-liiga team: JYP Jyväskylä
- Playing career: 2006–present

Matti Koistinen (born January 18, 1986) is a Finnish professional ice hockey player who played with JYP Jyväskylä in the SM-liiga during the 2010–11 season.
