= Nelson Byrd Woltz Landscape Architects =

American landscape architecture firm

Practice information
- Firm type: Landscape Architecture
- Partners: Thomas Woltz; Warren Byrd (former); Susan Nelson (former)
- Founded: 1985
- Location: Charlottesville, Virginia; and New York, New York

Significant works and honors
- Projects: Memorial Park, Houston Lakeshore Park, Knoxville, Tennessee Olana State Historic Site, New York Rice University Academic Quadrangle, Houston Georgia Institute of Technology EcoCommons, Atlanta Centennial Park, Nashville Rothko Chapel, Houston Hudson Yards The Public Square and Gardens, New York Alethia Tanner Park, Washington, D.C. Monticello Contemplative Site and Burial Ground

Website
- www.nbwla.com

Nelson Byrd Woltz Landscape Architects (NBW) is an American landscape architecture firm based in New York, Charlottesville, and Houston, led by Thomas Woltz.

== History ==
Warren Byrd and Susan Nelson founded Nelson Byrd Landscape Architects in 1985 in Charlottesville, Virginia. Thomas Woltz became a named partner in 2004 and sole owner of the firm in 2013.

== Notable Work ==
The firm's notable work includes designing major public parks, restoring damaged ecological landscapes, and developing projects that combine agriculture, ecological restoration, and cultural use.

At Memorial Park in Houston, the largest urban green space in Texas at 1,500 acres, the firm revitalized the drought-stricken landscape with native plantings and features including the Eastern Glades, the Land Bridge and Prairie, a running track, and a reconstructed stream. A 100-acre swath of the park will become a memorial to soldiers of the First World War, with a budget of $42 million as of 2025.

At the Citygarden park and sculpture garden in St. Louis, NBW transformed an unused plot within the 1.1-mile-long strip of open space called the Gateway Mall, into a series of meandering paths meant to evoke the nearby Mississippi River. The park features sculptural work from contemporary and modern artists. The park opened in July 2009 and was conceived to be a “sculpture garden, urban park, and urban garden”.

The public square and gardens at Hudson Yards in New York City is a 5-acre (2 ha) landscaped space with 28,000 plants and 225 trees on a platform spanning dozens of active rail lines that generate intense heat from below, requiring intricate soil engineering and cooling systems. The plaza's southern side includes a canopy of trees, while the southeast entrance also contains a fountain. A "'seasonally expressive' entry garden" stands outside the entrance to the New York City Subway's 34th Street–Hudson Yards station. The plaza also connects to the High Line, an elevated promenade at its south end.

Orongo Station in New Zealand is a 3,000-acre coastal farm where NBW's work combined ecological restoration, responsible agriculture, and cultural revitalization in consultation with local Maori people.

Boardwalk in the Eastern Glades of Memorial Park, Houston

NBW has been recognized for the design of memorials and historically sensitive sites including the Burial Ground for Enslaved People at Monticello, the Brooklyn Naval Cemetery Landscape, the John Jay Heritage Center, George Washington's Mount Vernon, and the Georgia Institute of Technology EcoCommons. Another of the firm's notable university projects is Rice University's Academic Quadrangle, where the firm's "deep dive into the history of the campus and the Texas climate" led to a contextually sensitive redesign involving thousands of new plants and shade trees as well as new paths and gathering spaces.

Additional notable landscape architecture projects include the Olana State Historic Site in New York, the Rothko Chapel in Houston, Bok Tower Gardens in Florida, Hudson Valley Shakespeare, and the Ismaili Center Houston. Lakeshore Park in Knoxville, Tennessee, with its earthworks and esplanades, has become the city's most visited public green space.

== Books and Exhibitions ==
Nelson Byrd Woltz is the subject two books. The first, Garden, Park, Community, Farm ISBN 9781616891145, with essays by landscape historian Elizabeth K. Meyer, was published in 2013 by Princeton Architectural Press. The second, The Land is Full ISBN 9781580936606, published by The Monacelli Press in 2024, includes essays by Nina-Marie Lister, Brent Leggs, and Robert Pogue Harrison. Thomas Woltz published essays in Spaces of Sociability: The Ismaili Center Houston ISBN 9783966800556 and Olana: Frederic Church's Vision of Art and Landscape ISBN 978-0-8478-7695-2. In 2025, the firm's work received a solo exhibition at the University of Virginia School of Architecture.

== See also ==
- Landscape Architecture
- Hudson Yards
- Olana State Historic Site
- Citygarden
- Memorial Park
