= Sergey Mikhalyov =

Russian ice hockey coach and general manager

Sergey Mikhalyov

Sergey Mikhaylovich Mikhalyov (Russian: Серге́й Миха́йлович Михалёв; 5 October 1947 – 21 April 2015) was a Russian ice hockey coach. He coached Salavat Yulaev Ufa in the 2008–09 and 2011–12 seasons, and was the general manager of Lada Togliatti in the VHL. In 2006, he coached Russia men's national junior ice hockey team to a silver medal.

Mikhalyov was born in Chelyabinsk, Russia. On 21 April 2015, he was killed in a head-on collision with a truck on a highway in Chelyabinsk region while returning home from the funeral of Traktor Chelyabinsk coach Valery Belousov.
