= Fiola =

Fiola is a surname. Notable people with the surname include:

- Attila Fiola (born 1990), Hungarian footballer
- Eddie Fiola (born 1964), American freestyle BMX rider

== Other uses ==
- Fiola (restaurant), a Michelin-starred restaurant in Washington, D.C.

== See also ==
- Fiðla
- Fjolla
