= Thomas Woltz =

American Architect

Thomas L. Woltz, FASLA
- Born: September 25, 1967 (age 59); Mount Airy, North Carolina
- Occupation: Landscape architect

Thomas L. Woltz (born September 25, 1967) is an American landscape architect known for integrating ecological systems with cultural history in public parks and historic sites. He is the senior principal and owner of landscape architecture firm Nelson Byrd Woltz Landscape Architects (NBW).

== Biography ==
Woltz was born and raised on a cattle and crop farm in Mount Airy, North Carolina. His father, John Elliott Woltz Sr., was the owner of fine knitwear company Quality Mills and his mother Mary Patricia "Pat" Gwyn Woltz was a philanthropist, civic leader, and artist. Woltz's childhood experiences on a family-owned farm influenced his later approach to conservation agriculture and the "shaping, transformation, and reformation of actual rural agricultural landscapes," according to landscape historian Elizabeth Meyer.

Woltz earned a bachelor's degree in architectural design, architectural history, and studio art from the University of Virginia in 1990. After receiving his undergraduate degree , Woltz moved to Venice, Italy, where he worked at architecture firm Giorgio Bellavitis Architetti in addition to leading the University of Virginia's summer program in Vicenza, Italy for architecture students. In Venice he gained "an entirely new understanding of landscape" beyond planted areas, encompassing urban spaces and "everything I experienced outside of buildings." and later master's degrees in both architecture and landscape architecture from the University of Virginia.

He returned to the University of Virginia in 1994 to resume his studies in architecture and landscape architecture, receiving a master's degree for each subject in 1996 and 1997, respectively. Upon graduation, Woltz started working at what was then Nelson Byrd Landscape Architects, under his former professor Warren T. Byrd, Jr., and partner Susan Nelson. In 2003, Woltz became named partner of Nelson Byrd Woltz Landscape Architects, and its sole proprietor in 2013. His impact on the firm includes broadening the role of landscape architecture from public parks and campuses to restoration ecology, planning, civil engineering, horticultural design, and conservation agriculture.

== Work and Approach ==
Major projects include Memorial Park in Houston, where Woltz's firm covered a six-lane highway with a restored prairie landscape. Other notable landscapes include Bok Tower Gardens, Frederic Chuch's Olana State Historic Site, the Burial Ground for Enslaved People at Monticello, the Flight 93 Memorial, Machicomoco State Park in Virginia, Alethia Tanner Park, the EcoCommons at Georgia Tech, the public square and gardens at Hudson Yards, the Ismaili Center Houston, Nick's Head Station, Lakeshore Park, The Ramble in Arkansas, and the Rice University Academic Quadrangle.

Woltz has said that one of his most important moves was hiring scientists and historians as part of his staff to integrate research into the design process. At the beginning of each project, he researches the ecological systems and cultural history of the site, including a "bio blitz" cataloguing the living organisms on the site. "I am always looking for the story of a site... whether an asphalt parking lot in New York or a rain forest in New Zealand," he told the Wall Street Journal. He was named WSJ Magazine's Design Innovator of 2013. He urged architects and landscape architects to "reimagine transportation infrastructure to deliver generous urban experiences that encourage new forms of community, gathering, and celebration."

Woltz's research-driven approach begins with the idea that "The Land Is Full," an acknowledgment that all landscapes have stories embedded within them. His firm's work at Thomas Jefferson's Monticello, the Georgia Institute of Technology, Memorial Park Houston, the Nina Simone House in North Carolina, and the John Coltrane and Alice Coltrane House, among other sites, "mitigate erasure" by integrating landscape architecture with historic preservation, according to architectural historian and preservationist Brent Leggs. His work brings together "rigorous scientific research, an investigation of cultural and historical meaning, a philosophy of beauty—all built into a deep-rooted belief that we're part of nature," historian Andrea Wulf wrote. Woltz's holistic approach led the scholar and literary critic Robert Pogue Harrison to write, "Thomas Woltz has a special ear for a landscape's note or inner melody." What makes Woltz unique, according to Charles Birnbaum, is that "his work strives to make visible, interpret and ultimately dignify the ecological and cultural values that are embedded in the landscape."

His approach to designing with land and memory is reflected in his essays published in Olana: Frederic Church's Vision of Art and Landscape ISBN 978-0-8478-7695-2 and Spaces of Sociability: The Ismaili Center Houston ISBN 9783966800556, as well as his firm's monograph,The Land is Full ISBN 9781580936606.
