= Igor Baček =

Slovak ice hockey player

- Born: January 30, 1986 (age 39); Bratislava, Czechoslovakia
- Height: 6 ft 0 in (183 cm)
- Weight: 176 lb (80 kg; 12 st 8 lb)
- Position: Left wing
- Shoots: Left
- Oberliga team Former teams: Hannover Indians; HC Slovan Bratislava; HC '05 Banská Bystrica; MHC Martin
- NHL draft: Undrafted
- Playing career: 2005–present

Igor Baček (born January 30, 1986) is a Slovak professional ice hockey player who currently plays for the Hannover Indians of the German Oberliga. He previously played in the Slovak Extraliga with HC Slovan Bratislava, HC '05 Banská Bystrica and MHC Martin, and after moving to Germany in 2010 featured in short spells for seven other clubs before settling at the Indians in 2017.
