= Christopher Rivera =

Swiss ice hockey player

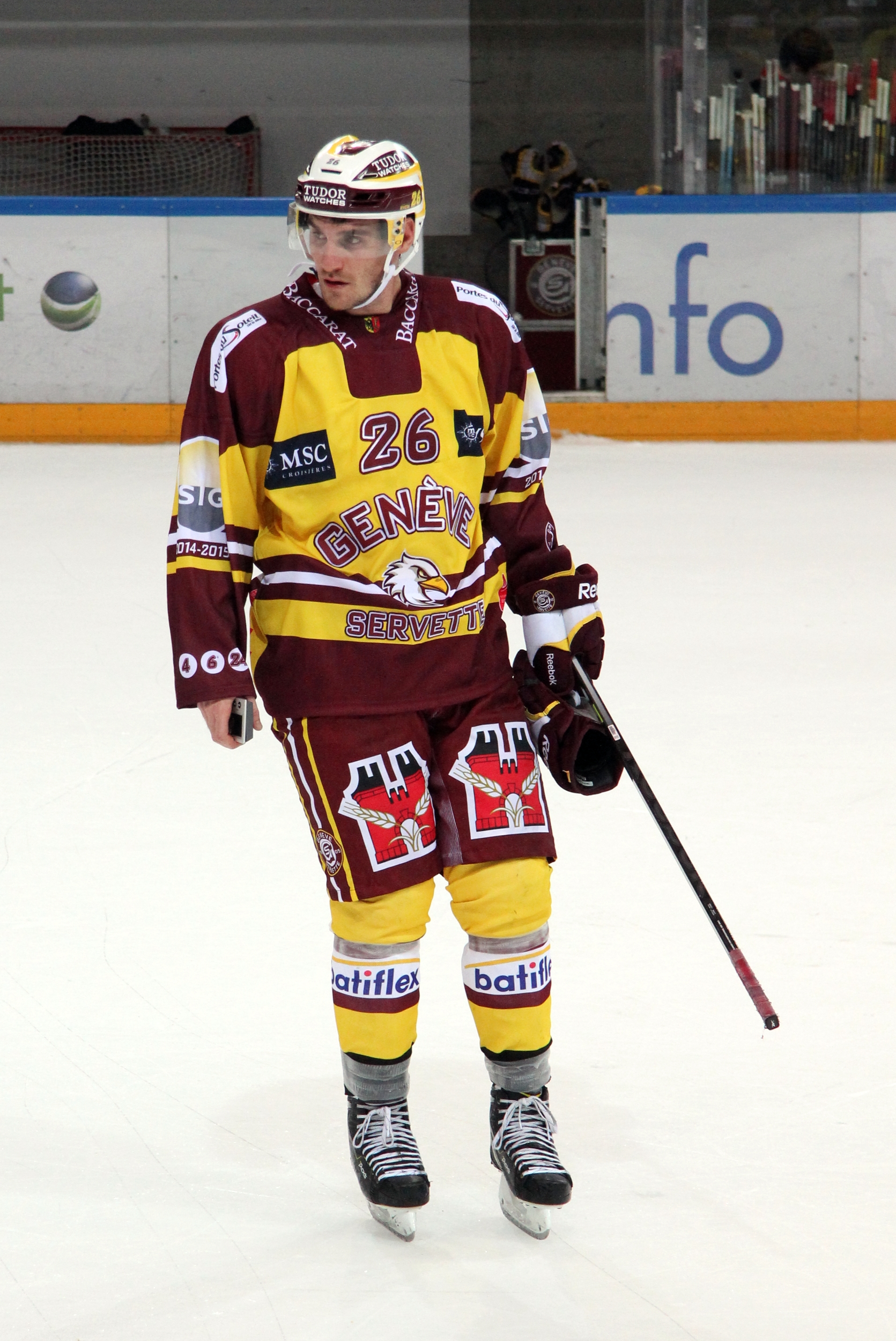
- Born: October 2, 1986 (age 39) Geneva, Switzerland
- Height: 6 ft 3 in (191 cm)
- Weight: 198 lb (90 kg; 14 st 2 lb)
- Position: Forward
- Shot: Left
- Played for: Genève-Servette HC; HC Fribourg-Gottéron
- NHL draft: Undrafted
- Playing career: 2004–2018

Christopher Rivera (born October 2, 1986) is a Swiss former professional ice hockey player who spent most of his career with Genève-Servette HC in the National League (NL). He also played for HC Fribourg-Gottéron in the NL.

Rivera regularly works as a hockey analyst for the Francophone Swiss TV station, Léman Bleu.

== Playing career ==
Rivera made his National League (NL) debut playing with Genève-Servette HC during the 2003–04 NL playoffs.

On September 15, 2015, he was traded to Geneva's rival, Fribourg-Gotteron, for cash consideration.

On July 23, 2018, Rivera was released by Gottéron despite a valid contract with the team for the 2018/19 season. He eventually retired from professional hockey following the 2017/18 season. Rivera went on to play two more seasons with two different amateur teams in the Geneva area.
