= Kristina Fialová =

Czech classical violist

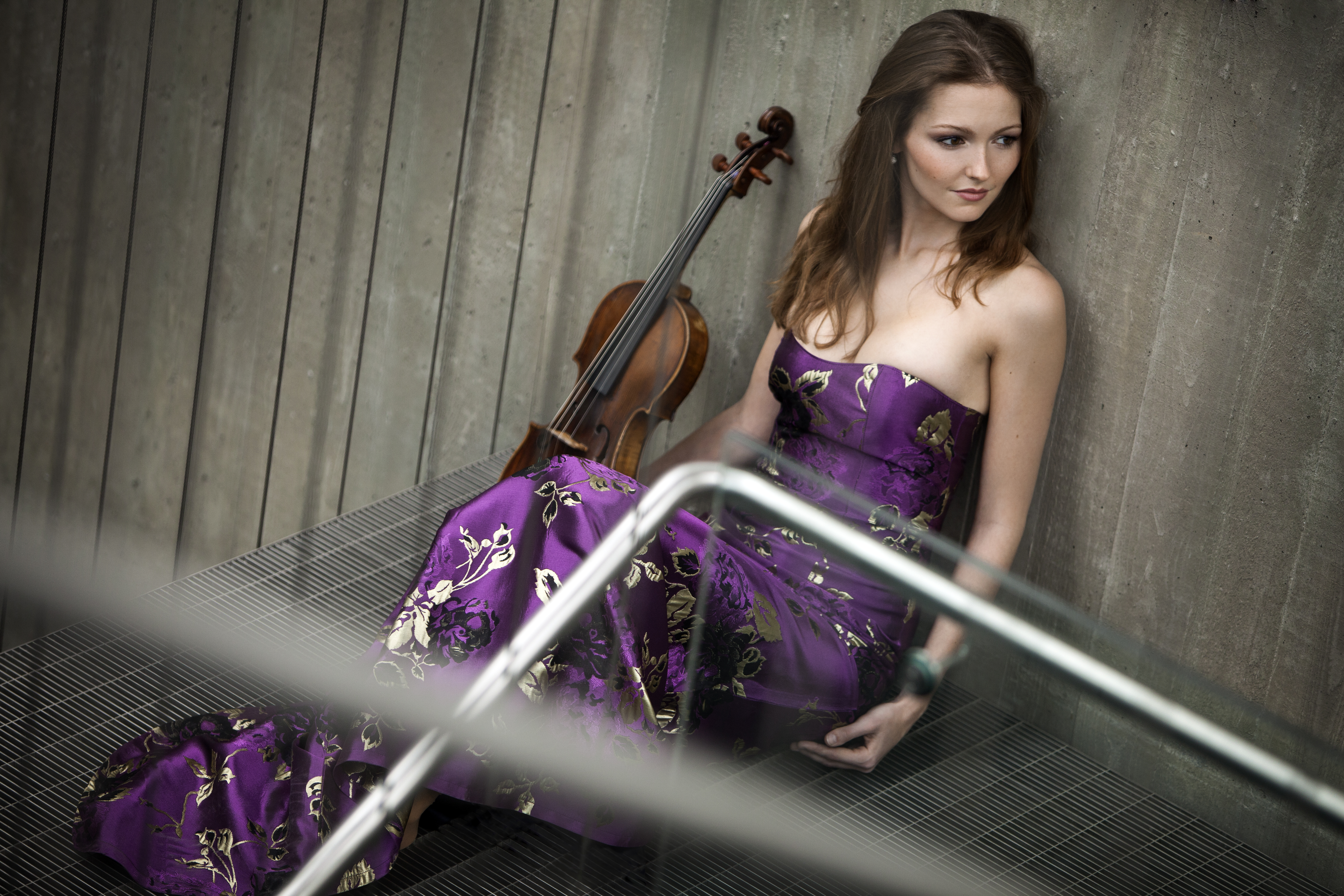
Fialová in 2013

Kristina Fialová (born 1987) is a Czech classical violist.

== Early life and education ==
Fialová was born in 1987 in Brno. Her father is the composer Petr Fiala. She is a graduate of the Brno Conservatory (Miroslav Kovář), the Music Faculty of the Academy of Performing Arts in Prague (Prof. Jan Pěruška), the Royal Danish Academy of Music in Copenhagen (Prof. Tim Frederikson, Prof. Lars Anders Tomter), and the Hochschule für Musik Carl Maria von Weber in Dresden (Prof. Vladimír Bukač).

== Career ==
She has been primarily praised by the critics for her technique, impassioned performance and sophisticated musical sentiment. After winning the 2013 Michal Spisak International Competition in Katowice, Poland, she was invited to the major concert stages in Europe. Her appearance at the Tivoli Festival in Denmark was followed by her debuting at the Tonhalle Zürich and giving a recital at the 2015 Prague Spring Festival.

She has regularly performed with Czech and foreign orchestras (the Copenhagen Philharmonic, Aarhus Symphony Orchestra, Prague Philharmonia, the Czech National Symphony Orchestra, Janáček Philharmonic Orchestra etc.). As a chamber musician, she has collaborated with a number of soloists (Radovan Vlatković, Sophia Jaffé, Ivan Ženatý, Václav Hudeček, Igor Ardašev, Martin Kasík, Petr Nouzovský) and ensembles (Atos Trio). Kristina Fialová has performed at concert hall across Europe, including Russia, as well as in Africa, Asia and the Americas, and at major festivals (Festival Internacional de Santander, the Bergen International Festival, the Vesna v Rossii). She has garnered accolades at international competitions, including the ACT London, the Danish Soloist Competition, the International Johannes Brahms Competition, etc. Kristina Fialová studied at the Brno Conservatory, the Hochschüle für Musik Carl Maria von Weber in Dresden (Prof. Vladimír Bukač), the Royal Danish Academy of Music in Copenhagen (Profs. Tim Frederikson and Lars Anders Tomter), and the Academy of Performing Arts in Prague (Prof. Jan Pěruška). She further honed her skills at master classes led by top-notch soloists and pedagogues around the world (Leif Ove Andsnes, Wolfram Christ, Tatiana Masurenko).

Kristina Fialová has recorded six CDs for Supraphon, ArcoDiva and Dacapo. She has given master classes in Lima, Copenhagen, Qingdao and Guangzhou. She plays a Carlo Antonio Testore – Contrada 1745 viola, and a bow made by the bowmaker Petr Auředník. She is a Pirastro artist and she exclusively uses Pirastro strings.
