= Mikko Alikoski =

Finnish ice hockey player

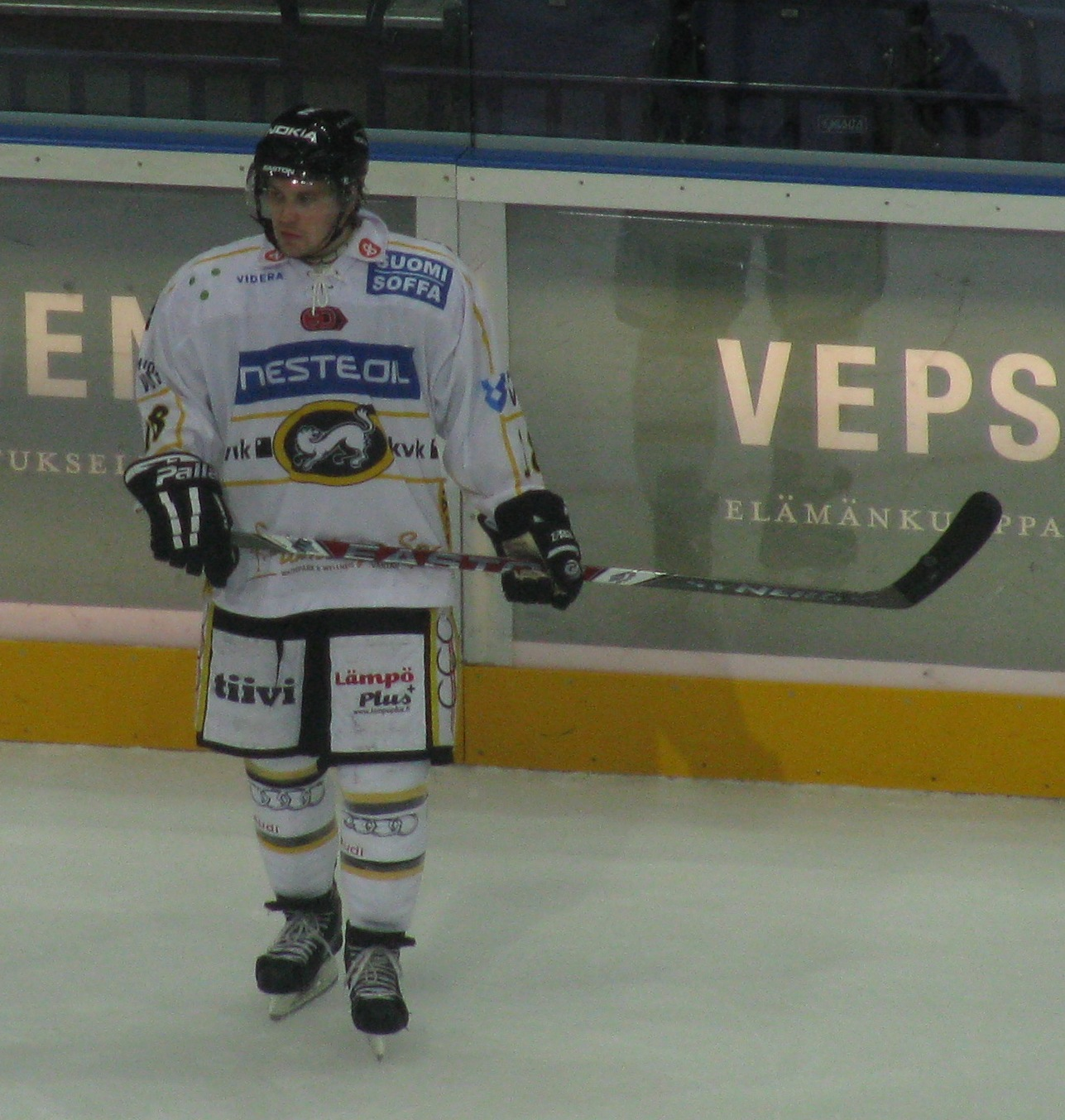
- Born: July 28, 1986 (age 40) Oulu, Finland
- Height: 5 ft 8 in (173 cm)
- Weight: 176 lb (80 kg; 12 st 8 lb)
- Position: Forward
- Shoots: Left
- SM-liiga team Former teams: KooKoo (Liiga); Oulun Kärpät
- NHL draft: Undrafted
- Playing career: 2003–present

Mikko Alikoski (born July 28, 1986) is a Finnish ice hockey player. He was last known to play professionally for KooKoo (Liiga) of the Finnish Liiga.

Alikoski made his SM-liiga debut playing with Oulun Kärpät during the 2003–04 SM-liiga season.
