= Ondřej Šmach =

Czech ice hockey player

- Born: July 21, 1986 (age 39) Hodonín, Czechoslovakia
- Height: 5 ft 11 in (180 cm)
- Weight: 194 lb (88 kg; 13 st 12 lb)
- Position: Defence
- Shoots: Left
- Tipsport Liga team Former teams: HC Nové Zámky; HC Znojemští Orli; Vsetínská hokejová HC Kladno; HK 36 Skalica; HC Karlovy Vary; HC '05 Banská Bystrica; HC Košice; Gothiques d'Amiens
- Playing career: 2004–present

Ondřej Šmach (born July 21, 1986) is a Czech professional ice hockey defenceman. He is currently playing for HC Nové Zámky of the Tipsport Liga.

Šmach has also played in the Czech Extraliga for HC Znojemští Orli, Vsetínská hokejová, HC Kladno and HC Karlovy Vary.
