= Tommy Wargh =

Swedish ice hockey player

- Born: December 19, 1986 (age 39) Örnsköldsvik, Sweden
- Height: 5 ft 10 in (178 cm)
- Weight: 176 lb (80 kg; 12 st 8 lb)
- Position: Defence
- Shoots: Left
- ML team Former teams: SønderjyskE Ishockey; MODO Hockey; Yugra Khanty-Mansiysk; Automobilist Ekaterinburg; HIFK
- Playing career: 2005–present

Tommy Andreas Wargh (born December 19, 1986, in Örnsköldsvik) is a Swedish ice hockey player, he played with Molot-Prikamye Perm of the Russian Supreme League before signing with HC Yugra of the Kontinental Hockey League.

== Career ==
On 16 July 2009 he left Modo Hockey of the Elitserien and joined Molot-Prikamye Perm, signing a one-year contract. In 2013, Wargh joined the Swedish team Björklöven IF. From 2016 to 2021 he played for Boden Hockey. After a year idle, in the 2022-3 season he played for Piteå HC.
