= Jozef Wagenhoffer =

Slovak ice hockey player

- Born: May 11, 1986 (age 40) Bratislava, Czechoslovakia
- Height: 6 ft 4 in (193 cm)
- Weight: 209 lb (95 kg; 14 st 13 lb)
- Shot: left
- Played for: Slovak Extraliga; HC Slovan Bratislava; Slovak 1.Liga; HK Trnava; HK Ružinov; Czech 1.liga HC Berounští Medvědi; BK Mladá Boleslav; HC Vrchlabí; IHL; Flint Generals; FFHG Division 1 Bisons de Neuilly-sur-Marne
- Playing career: 2004–2015

Jozef Wagenhoffer (born May 11, 1986) is a Slovak professional ice hockey player who played with HC Slovan Bratislava in the Slovak Extraliga. He was born in Bratislava and later also played for the Flint Generals in the United States and for Bisons de Neuilly-sur-Marne in France.

== Career statistics ==
			Regular season					Playoffs
Season	Team	League	GP	G	A	Pts	PIM	GP	G	A	Pts	PIM
2001–02	HC Slovan Bratislava U18	Slovak U18	30	0	6	6	36	8	0	0	0	10
2002–03	HC Slovan Bratislava U18	Slovak U18	52	4	11	15	94	6	0	1	1	10
2002–03	HC Slovan Bratislava U20	Slovak U20	2	0	0	0	0	—	—	—	—	—
2003–04	HC Slovan Bratislava U18	Slovak U18	13	3	2	5	65	3	0	0	0	27
2003–04	HC Slovan Bratislava U20	Slovak U20	40	2	6	8	36	4	0	2	2	4
2004–05	HC Slovan Bratislava U20	Slovak U20	36	5	11	16	177	2	0	0	0	27
2004–05	HC Slovan Bratislava	Slovak	3	0	0	0	0	5	0	0	0	8
2004–05	HK Trnava	Slovak2	18	0	0	0	30	—	—	—	—	—
2005–06	HC Slovan Bratislava U20	Slovak U20	4	1	0	1	33	—	—	—	—	—
2005–06	HC Slovan Bratislava	Slovak	36	1	0	1	20	4	0	0	0	4
2006–07	HC Slovan Bratislava	Slovak	17	0	0	0	10	1	0	0	0	2
2006–07	HK Ružinov 99 Bratislava	Slovak2	12	3	1	4	66	4	1	0	1	6
2007–08	HC Berounští Medvědi	Czech2	16	0	4	4	83	—	—	—	—	—
2007–08	BK Mladá Boleslav	Czech2	17	0	4	4	61	—	—	—	—	—
2007–08	HC Junior Mělník	Czech3	11	1	5	6	82	—	—	—	—	—
2008–09	HC Vrchlabí	Czech2	36	1	2	3	84	—	—	—	—	—
2009–10	Flint Generals	IHL	13	0	0	0	15	—	—	—	—	—
2009–10	HK Trnava	Slovak2	9	0	3	3	10	9	1	3	4	25
2010–11	Bisons de Neuilly-sur-Marne	France2	23	0	5	5	75	7	1	3	4	6
2011–12	Bisons de Neuilly-sur-Marne	Ligue Magnus	2	0	0	0	8	—	—	—	—	—
2012–13	Bisons de Neuilly-sur-Marne	France2	21	7	13	20	42	1	0	0	0	25
2013–14	Bisons de Neuilly-sur-Marne	France2	25	8	13	21	78	6	1	3	4	20
2014–15	Bisons de Neuilly-sur-Marne	France2	24	9	8	17	22	2	0	0	0	2
IHL totals			13	0	0	0	15	—	—	—	—	—
Czech2 totals			69	1	10	11	228	—	—	—	—	—
Slovak totals			56	1	0	1	30	—	—	—	—	—
France2 totals			93	24	39	63	217	—	—	—	—	—
Slovak2 totals			39	3	4	7	106	—	—	—	—	—
