= Jim Fiala =

American chef

Jim Fiala is a chef who owns two restaurants in the St. Louis, Missouri area. His restaurants are The Crossing in Clayton, Missouri and Acero in Maplewood, Missouri.

== Early life ==
Fiala is a St. Louis area native, who grew up in the suburbs of Crestwood, Sunset Hills and unincorporated West County. He is a 1983 graduate of Parkway West High School. (He is a 2014 inductee into the Parkway Alumni Hall of Fame.) He has a degree in Finance from Southern Methodist University in Dallas, Texas.

Fiala’s parents introduced him to fine dining at an early age. For his 13th birthday he was taken to dinner at St. Louis’ most elite restaurant, Tony’s. When the family traveled to New York or Los Angeles, they always dined at the places that were highly rated in the Michelin guide. [12]

== Early training ==
Upon graduation from S.M.U., Fiala worked briefly in the Dallas area for an agency that promoted professional wrestling in Texas. In early 1988, he joined Clipper Cruise Lines as a deckhand. When an opening occurred in the kitchen, he took the job and began his career in cooking. He says "I got stuck in the galley for seven weeks and fell in love with cooking." [11]

In late 1989, Fiala returned to St. Louis and worked for just over a year preparing food for Catering St. Louis. Fiala enrolled in the California Culinary Academy in San Francisco at the beginning of 1991. During his time in the Bay Area he worked for chef Jeremiah Trotter at Stars restaurant and for chef Patricia Unterman at Hayes Street Grill.

== Chicago and New York ==
Upon graduation from California Culinary Academy in November, 1992, Fiala returned to the Midwest and accepted a job offer from Chicago’s Spiaggia restaurant in the Gold Coast area. He started at $6.50/hour and performed every aspect of kitchen work. [12]

In 1994, Paul Bartolotta of Spiaggia called Daniel Boulud, owner of Restaurant Daniel in New York City, and asked if he needed staff. Boulud said yes and asked about Fiala "Can he handle the pressure?" Bartolotta assured him that Fiala was ready for the move to the Big Apple. Fiala’s kitchen jobs in New York included "entremetier" (vegetable cook) and "poissoniere" (fish cook). He also, for a time, made all the restaurant’s pasta. During his tenure there, Restaurant Daniel earned its New York Times four star rating.

Following his time in New York City, Fiala was recruited to cook at the Horned Dorsett Primavera resort in Puerto Rico.

== Return to St. Louis ==
In late 1997, Fiala came back to St. Louis. On April 15, 1998, with then business partner Cary McDowell, Fiala opened The Crossing (7823 Forsyth Boulevard) in Clayton. The name of the restaurant represented a "crossing" of Italian and French influences. The restaurant received several positive reviews early on and has enjoyed strong popularity as a leader of the "new breed" of fine dining establishments in metro St. Louis. [13]

R.W. Apple Jr. wrote about The Crossing in the New York Times: "Two chefs from Daniel in New York have set St. Louis on its conservative ear with this stylish bilevel establishment. A piece of poached skate that all but melted into a pile of mashed potatoes, formed the centerpiece of a satisfying meal that began with roasted beets and goat cheese and ended with perfectly simple, simply perfect vanilla ice cream."

Joe Bonwich, then writing for the Riverfront Times, said of The Crossing: "The result is a truly unique and innovative style for St. Louis and we should all be hopeful that Fiala’s youthful wanderlust has worn off and that he’s come back to stay." He added: "This place certainly aspires to a national reputation."

In August 2011, Fiala opened the causal restaurant Liluma Side Door in Central West End. It was closed in December 2012.

== Acero ==
Fiala’s Italian restaurant is Acero in suburban Maplewood, Missouri (7266 Manchester Road).

Acero was featured in 2008 in the annual Restaurant issue of Bon Appetit magazine. "The Best Italian Food in America" were the words on the cover of the issue (September, 2008). Inside the magazine was a feature that included recipes from twelve different restaurants in the U.S. Acero’s contribution was its cauliflower ravioli with guanciale. Acero was the only St. Louis restaurant included.

Fiala’s concept for Acero is "artisan." He says "I want Acero to be recognized as an ‘artisan’ restaurant, a place that embraces the Italian artisans, the guys who...have elevated our palates and now our expectations."

== Personal life and philosophy ==
Fiala is a "hands on" owner who spends time at each of his restaurants daily. His top priority is quality control. His mission: "We work on improving everyday." He has told his employees that their goal should be to make "every meal a great meal." [14]

Fiala is married and has three children.
