= Radek Fiala =

Czech ice hockey player

- Born: February 9, 1986 (age 40) Brno, Czechoslovakia
- Height: 5 ft 10 in (178 cm)
- Weight: 168 lb (76 kg; 12 st 0 lb)
- Position: Goaltender
- Caught: Left
- Played for: HC Litvínov
- NHL draft: Undrafted
- Playing career: 2004–2011

Radek Fiala (born February 9, 1986, in Brno, Czechoslovakia, now the Czech Republic) is a Czech former professional ice hockey goaltender who played for HC Litvínov in the Czech Extraliga (ELH). He won the rookie of the year award in the Czech Extraliga during the 2005–06 season.
