= Sebastian Karlsson =

Sebastian Karlsson may refer to:

- Sebastian Karlsson (singer), Swedish singer
- Sebastian Karlsson (ice hockey), Swedish ice hockey player
- Sebastian Karlsson (handballer), Swedish handball player
