= 2006 World Junior Ice Hockey Championships =

2006 IIHF World U20 Championship

Tournament details
- Host country: Canada
- Venues: 4 (in 3 host cities)
- Dates: 26 December 2005 – 5 January 2006
- Teams: 10

Final positions
- Champions: Canada (12th title)
- Runners-up: Russia
- Third place: Finland
- Fourth place: United States

Tournament statistics
- Games played: 31
- Goals scored: 195 (6.29 per game)
- Attendance: 325,138 (10,488 per game)
- Scoring leader: (United States) Phil Kessel (11 points)

Awards
- MVP: (Russia) Evgeni Malkin

The 2006 World Junior Ice Hockey Championships (2006 WJHC) were held in Vancouver, Kelowna and Kamloops, British Columbia, Canada. The championships began on December 26, 2005, and finished on January 5, 2006. Games were played at GM Place and Pacific Coliseum in Vancouver, the Interior Savings Centre in Kamloops and Prospera Place in Kelowna. Canada was the winner defeating Russia 5–0 in the gold medal game. Total attendance was 325,138 (a new record) spread over 31 games, for an average of 10,488 per game.

== Top Division ==
=== Venues ===
GM Place Capacity: 18,630	Pacific Coliseum Capacity: 16,281	Prospera Place Capacity: 6,886	Interior Savings Centre Capacity: 5,658
Canada – Vancouver	Canada – Vancouver	Canada – Kelowna	Canada – Kamloops

=== Preliminary round ===
All times are local (UTC−8).

==== Group A ====
Pos	Team	Pld	W	D	L	GF	GA	GD	Pts	Qualification
1	Canada (H)	4	4	0	0	16	6	+10	8	Semifinals
2	United States	4	2	1	1	21	12	+9	5	Quarterfinals
3	Finland	4	2	0	2	19	13	+6	4	Quarterfinals
4	Switzerland	4	1	1	2	8	10	−2	3	Relegation round
5	Norway	4	0	0	4	3	26	−23	0	Relegation round

Source: IIHF
(H) Hosts

December 26, 2005; 16:00	Finland	1–5 (0–2, 0–2, 1–1)	Canada	Pacific Coliseum, Vancouver; Attendance: 16,083

Game reference
Seitsonen 48:49 (PP1) / Goals / Boyd 10:23 (PP1), 34:24; Comeau 15:52; Bolland 23:17 (PP1); Chipchura 54:03

December 26, 2005; 20:00	Norway	2–11 (0–3, 1–5, 1–3)	United States	Pacific Coliseum, Vancouver; Attendance: 12,232

Game reference
Sveum 29:00 (PP1); Olimb 43:44 (PP1) / Goals / Oshie 2:19; E. Johnson 12:22 (PP1); Skille 17:30 (PP1); Bourque 21:23, 27:32, 31:11 (PP1), 51:38, 53:03 (SH1); Mueller 26:14; Porter 34:54 (PP1); Schremp 40:32

December 27, 2005; 19:00	Switzerland	2–0 (0–0, 1–0, 1–0)	Norway	Pacific Coliseum, Vancouver; Attendance: 11,976

Game reference
Joggi 33:52 (PP1); Burgler 54:04 (PP1) / Goals

December 28, 2005; 16:00	Canada	4–3 (2–1, 2–1, 0–1)	Switzerland	Pacific Coliseum, Vancouver; Attendance: 16,123

Game reference
Downie 8:45 (PP1); Boyd 17:45; Pyatt 30:00; Bolland 33:39 (PP1) / Goals / Blum 5:33 (PP2); Weber 34:37; Sprünger 42:42 (PP1)

December 28, 2005; 20:00	United States	6–5 (3–2, 2–1, 1–2)	Finland	Pacific Coliseum, Vancouver; Attendance: 12,209

Game reference
Fritsche 9:42 (PP1); Wheeler 17:05, 39:18; Lee 19:49 (PP1); Ryan 28:01 (PP1); Porter 49:49 (PP1) / Goals / Alikoski 6:21; Korpikoski 8:26 (SH1); Seitsonen 21:28 (PP1); Tukonen 55:34; Laakso 58:48 (PP1)

December 29, 2005; 16:00	Norway	0–4 (0–1, 0–3, 0–0)	Canada	Pacific Coliseum, Vancouver; Attendance: 16,083

Game reference
Goals / Barker 15:27 (PP1); Bolland 34:50 (PP1); Chipchura 35:16; Bourdon 36:41

December 30, 2005; 16:00	United States	2–2 (2–0, 0–0, 0–2)	Switzerland	Pacific Coliseum, Vancouver; Attendance: 12,130

Game reference
Paukovich 6:16; Ryan 16:59 / Goals / Blum 47:53 (PP1); Joggi 54:08 (PP2)

December 30, 2005; 20:00	Finland	9–1 (7–0, 1–1, 1–0)	Norway	Pacific Coliseum, Vancouver; Attendance: 10,766

Game reference
Seppänen 1:10, 8:49; Lindgren 3:26; Jokinen 12:34 (PP1); Tukonen 15:30 (PP1); Heino 17:13; Seitsonen 18:32, 29:04; Kolehmainen 49:53 / Goals / Sveum 35:10 (PP1)

December 31, 2005; 16:00	Canada	3–2 (2–1, 0–1, 1–0)	United States	Pacific Coliseum, Vancouver; Attendance: 16,083

Game reference
Barker 2:35 (PP1); Boyd 6:42; Chipchura 59:27 (EN) / Goals / Bourque 10:27 (PP1); Mueller 28:10 (PP1)

December 31, 2005; 20:00	Switzerland	1–4 (0–1, 0–0, 1–3)	Finland	Pacific Coliseum, Vancouver; Attendance: 8,335

Game reference
Joggi 52:23 (PP1) / Goals / Kolehmainen 2:45 (PP1); Sinisalo 42:24; Lindgren 42:34; Laakso 59:49 (EN)

==== Group B ====
Pos	Team	Pld	W	D	L	GF	GA	GD	Pts	Qualification
1	Russia	4	4	0	0	21	6	+15	8	Semifinals
2	Sweden	4	3	0	1	20	9	+11	6	Quarterfinals
3	Czech Republic	4	2	0	2	14	14	0	4	Quarterfinals
4	Slovakia	4	1	0	3	12	21	−9	2	Relegation round
5	Latvia	4	0	0	4	8	25	−17	0	Relegation round

Source: IIHF

December 26, 2005; 19:00	Latvia	1–5 (1–2, 0–3, 0–0)	Czech Republic	Interior Savings Centre, Kamloops; Attendance: 4,653

Game reference

Uģis Avotiņš
Goalies
Marek Schwarz
Referee:
(Canada) Guy Pellerin
Linesmen:
(Canada) Sylvan Losier
(Canada) Geff MacDonald

	0–1	01:13 Hromas (Bahenský)
	0–2	08:16 Kalus (Polák)
Meija (Andersons) 11:16	1–2
	1–3	28:47 Pohl (Krejči)
	1–4	29:37 Meidl (Hanzal)
	1–5	37:52 Pohl (Krejči)

16 min
Penalties
20 min
20
Shots
39

December 26, 2005; 19:00	Sweden	1–5 (1–2, 0–1, 0–2)	Russia	Prospera Place, Kelowna; Attendance: 5,982

Game reference
Bergfors (PP) 07:37 / Goals / 08:45 (PP) Malkin; 13:51 (PP) Kulemin; 38:03 Voloshenko; 47:49 Shirokov; 52:00 (SH) Kulemin

December 27, 2005; 19:00	Slovakia	7–4 (2–0, 4–3, 1–1)	Latvia	Prospera Place, Kelowna; Attendance: 5,790

Game reference
Valábik 11:42; Lašček (PP) 18:30; Zagrapan 21:05; Lašček 28:28; Gračík 30:36; Lašček 39:03; Piatak 47:41 / Goals / 29:27 (PP) Galviņš; 37:25 Kļujevskis; 39:24 Želubovskis; 50:05 Želubovskis

December 28, 2005; 19:00	Czech Republic	2–3 (0–2, 1–1, 1–0)	Sweden	Interior Savings Centre, Kamloops; Attendance: 5,323

Game reference
Sobotka (PP) 36:25; Káňa (PP) 52:48 / Goals / 02:08 Karlsson; 03:49 Salmonsson; 20:52 O. Hedman

December 28, 2005; 19:00	Russia	6–2 (5–0, 0–1, 1–0)	Slovakia	Prospera Place, Kelowna; Attendance: 5,948

Game reference
Churilov 07:37; Lemtyugov (PP) 09:45; Lisin 10:32; Zubov (PP) 16:41; Malkin (PP) 19:09; Emelin (PP) 47:11 / Goals / 17:30 (PP) Sekera; 30:29 Lašček

December 29, 2005; 19:00	Latvia	1–3 (0–2, 1–1, 0–0)	Russia	Interior Savings Centre, Kamloops; Attendance: 4,831

Game reference
Kļujevskis (PP) 32:58 / Goals / 03:54 (PP) Malkin; 04:00 Lemtyugov; 36:26 Lemtyugov

December 30, 2005; 19:00	Czech Republic	5–3 (3–1, 1–0, 1–2)	Slovakia	Prospera Place, Kelowna; Attendance: 5,979

Game reference
Krejčí 00:26; Kudělka (PP) 10:01; Krejčí 10:22; Krejčí 30:36; Pohl 45:10 / Goals / 01:38 (PP) Zagrapan; 46:45 (PP) Gračík; 56:05 (PP) Scurko

December 30, 2005; 19:00	Sweden	10–2 (4–1, 3–0, 3–1)	Latvia	Interior Savings Centre, Kamloops; Attendance: 4,797

Game reference
Karlsson 01:06; Bäckström (PP) 14:40; Viklund (PP) 15:57; Pettersson 18:17; Bergfors (PP) 20:40; Bäckström 25:25; Salmonsson (SH) 29:35; Bäckström 41:25; Ritola 51:59; Pettersson (PP) 57:42 / Goals / 16:58 Karsums; 51:52 Karkliņš

December 31, 2005; 19:00	Slovakia	0–6 (0–2, 0–1, 0–3)	Sweden	Interior Savings Centre, Kamloops; Attendance: 4,712

Game reference
Goals / 07:07 Lindqvist; 13:01 (PP) Ritola; 34:20 Ryno; 43:33 Pettersson; 49:44 Axelsson; 52:22 Karlsson

December 31, 2005; 19:00	Russia	7–2 (1–0, 1–0, 5–2)	Czech Republic	Prospera Place, Kelowna; Attendance: 6,027

Game reference
Shirokov (PP) 16:20; Voloshenko 33:46; Malkin 41:07; Zubov (PP) 44:15; Voloshenko 46:14; Lisin 51:09; Radulov 56:07 / Goals / 48:47 Pohl; 49:35 (PP) Sobotka

=== Relegation round ===
Pos	Team	Pld	W	D	L	GF	GA	GD	Pts	Relegation
7	Switzerland	3	2	1	0	10	5	+5	5	
8	Slovakia	3	2	1	0	14	10	+4	5	
9	Latvia	3	1	0	2	10	12	−2	2	2007 Division I
10	Norway	3	0	0	3	3	10	−7	0	2007 Division I

Source: IIHF

January 2, 2006; 13:00	Switzerland	5–2 (1–0, 2–1, 2–1)	Latvia	Pacific Coliseum, Vancouver; Attendance: 7,616

Game reference

January 3, 2006; 13:00	Slovakia	4–3 (1–1, 2–2, 1–0)	Norway	Pacific Coliseum, Vancouver; Attendance: 5,038

Game reference

January 4, 2006; 12:00	Latvia	4–0 (1–0, 2–0, 1–0)	Norway	Pacific Coliseum, Vancouver; Attendance: 4,540

Game reference

January 4, 2006; 16:00	Switzerland	3–3 (2–1, 1–0, 0–2)	Slovakia	Pacific Coliseum, Vancouver; Attendance: 6,667

Game reference

=== Final round ===
==== Bracket ====
Quarterfinals
A2	United States	2
B3	Czech Republic	1
B2	Sweden	0
A3	Finland (OT)	1

Semifinals
B1	Russia	5
QF1	United States	1
A1	Canada	4
QF2	Finland	0

Final
SF1	Russia	0
SF2	Canada	5
Third place
Finland	4
United States	2

==== Quarterfinals ====
January 2, 2006; 16:00	Sweden	0–1 OT (0–0, 0–0, 0–0) (OT: 0–1)	Finland	General Motors Place, Vancouver; Attendance: 18,630

Game reference
Goals / 69:26 (PP) Laakso

January 2, 2006; 20:00	United States	2–1 (2–1, 0–0, 0–0)	Czech Republic	General Motors Place, Vancouver; Attendance: 14,890

Game reference
Kessel (PP) 03:23; Bourque 11:08 / Goals / 12:17 (PP) Šmíd

==== Semifinals ====
January 3, 2006; 16:00	Canada	4–0 (1–0, 1–0, 2–0)	Finland	General Motors Place, Vancouver; Attendance: 18,630

Game reference
Russell 18:16; Comeau 38:58; Letang (PP) 49:40; Cogliano 53:32 / Goals

January 3, 2006; 20:00	Russia	5–1 (1–0, 0–0, 4–1)	United States	General Motors Place, Vancouver; Attendance: 18,630

Game reference

Anton Khudobin
Goalies
Cory Schneider
Referee:
(Finland) Jyri Ronn
Linesmen:
(Canada) Jeff MacDonald
(Sweden) Fredrik Ulriksson

Kulemin (Zubov, Malkin) – 12:32	1–0
Kulemin (PP) – 41:42	2–0
	2–1	42:34 – Skille (J. Johnson, Bourque) (PP)
Emelin (Malkin) – 43:13	3–1
Shirokov (Lemtyugov) – 53:01	4–1
Lemtyugov (Shirokov, Buravchikov) – 55:15	5–1

51 min
Penalties
41 min
34
Shots
35

==== Fifth place game ====
January 4, 2006; 20:00	Sweden	3–1 (0–0, 0–0, 3–1)	Czech Republic	General Motors Place, Vancouver; Attendance: 10,684

Game reference
Rynol 41:42; Bergfors 42:07; Bäckström 59:12 / Goals / 43:16 Káňa

==== Bronze medal game ====
January 5, 2006; 12:00	Finland	4–2 (0–1, 2–0, 2–1)	United States	General Motors Place, Vancouver; Attendance: 15,107

Game reference
Sailio 33:32; Joensuu 34:51; Tukonen 53:20; Joensuu 55:24 / Goals / 12:11 Ryan; 51:03 (PP) J. Johnson

==== Final ====
January 5, 2006; 16:00	Russia	0–5 (0–2, 0–2, 0–1)	Canada	General Motors Place, Vancouver; Attendance: 18,630

Game reference

Anton Khudobin
Goalies
Justin Pogge
Referee:
(United States) Brian Thul
Linesmen:
(Czech Republic) František Kalivoda
(Finland) Juho Kautto

0–1	17:13 – Downie (Cogliano, Comeau)
0–2	18:56 – Comeau
0–3	32:02 – Blunden (Barker, Pouliot) (PP)
0–4	34:44 – Blunden (Barker, Russell) (PP)
0–5	57:15 – Chipchura (Cogliano, Bolland)

20 min
Penalties
14 min
35
Shots
34

=== Statistics ===
==== Scoring leaders ====
Pos	Player	Country	GP	G	A	Pts	+/−	PIM
1	Phil Kessel	United States	7	1	10	11	0	2
2	Evgeni Malkin	Russia	6	4	6	10	+5	12
3	Lauri Tukonen	Finland	7	3	7	10	+9	0
4	Stanislav Lašček	Slovakia	6	6	3	9	+3	8
5	Chris Bourque	United States	7	7	1	8	–1	12
6	Nicklas Bäckström	Sweden	6	4	3	7	+3	2
6	Mathias Joggi	Switzerland	6	4	3	7	–2	14
8	Bobby Ryan	United States	7	3	4	7	–1	0
8	Blake Comeau	Canada	6	3	4	7	+7	8
10	Marek Zagrapan	Slovakia	6	2	5	7	+3	18
10	Alexei Emelin	Russia	6	2	5	7	+3	39

GP = Games played; G = Goals; A = Assists; Pts = Points; +/− = Plus–minus; PIM = Penalties In Minutes
Source: IIHF

==== Goaltending leaders ====
(minimum 40% team's total ice time)

Pos	Player	Country	TOI	GA	GAA	Sv%	SO
1	Justin Pogge	Canada	360:00	6	1.00	95.20	3
2	Daniel Larsson	Sweden	249:26	4	0.96	95.18	1
3	Tuukka Rask	Finland	369:26	13	2.11	93.98	1
4	Anton Khudobin	Russia	300:00	11	2.20	93.29	0
5	Cory Schneider	United States	359:06	16	2.67	91.21	0

TOI = Time On Ice (minutes:seconds); GA = Goals against; GAA = Goals against average; Sv% = Save percentage; SO = Shutouts
Source: IIHF

=== Awards ===
- Best players selected by the Directorate:
  - Best Goaltender: (Finland) Tuukka Rask
  - Best Defenceman: (Canada) Marc Staal
  - Best Forward: (Russia) Evgeni Malkin

Source: IIHF

- Media All-Stars:
  - MVP: (Russia) Evgeni Malkin
  - Goaltender: (Finland) Tuukka Rask
  - Defencemen: (Canada) Luc Bourdon / (United States) Jack Johnson
  - Forwards: (Russia) Evgeni Malkin / (Finland) Lauri Tukonen / (Canada) Steve Downie

Source: IIHF

=== Final standings ===
	Team
1st place, gold medalist(s)	Canada
2nd place, silver medalist(s)	Russia
3rd place, bronze medalist(s)	Finland
4th	United States
5th	Sweden
6th	Czech Republic
7th	Switzerland
8th	Slovakia
9th	Latvia
10th	Norway

== Division I ==
The Division I Championships were played on December 11–17, 2005 in Bled, Slovenia (Group A) and on December 12–18, 2005 in Minsk, Belarus.

=== Group A ===
Pos	Team	Pld	W	D	L	GF	GA	GD	Pts	Promotion or relegation
1	Germany	5	5	0	0	20	2	+18	10	Promoted to the 2007 Top Division
2	Denmark	5	3	1	1	20	17	+3	7	
3	Slovenia	5	3	0	2	17	8	+9	6	
4	France	5	1	2	2	8	7	+1	4	
5	Ukraine	5	1	1	3	10	22	−12	3	
6	Japan	5	0	0	5	10	29	−19	0	Relegated to the 2007 Division II

=== Group B ===
Pos	Team	Pld	W	D	L	GF	GA	GD	Pts	Promotion or relegation
1	Belarus	5	4	1	0	24	6	+18	9	Promoted to the 2007 Top Division
2	Kazakhstan	5	4	0	1	21	8	+13	8	
3	Italy	5	2	1	2	14	15	−1	5	
4	Poland	5	1	2	2	9	14	−5	4	
5	Austria	5	0	2	3	5	16	−11	2	
6	Hungary	5	0	2	3	6	20	−14	2	Relegated to the 2007 Division II

== Division II ==
The Division II Championships were played on December 12–18, 2005, in Bucharest, Romania (Group A) and on January 10–16, 2006, in Belgrade, Serbia and Montenegro.

=== Group A ===
Pos	Team	Pld	W	D	L	GF	GA	GD	Pts	Promotion or relegation
1	Great Britain	5	5	0	0	53	3	+50	10	Promoted to the 2007 Division I
2	Netherlands	5	3	1	1	38	8	+30	7	
3	Romania	5	3	1	1	31	11	+20	7	
4	Spain	5	2	0	3	15	33	−18	4	
5	Australia	5	1	0	4	17	37	−20	2	
6	New Zealand	5	0	0	5	2	64	−62	0	Relegated to the 2007 Division III

=== Group B ===
Pos	Team	Pld	W	D	L	GF	GA	GD	Pts	Promotion or relegation
1	Estonia	5	5	0	0	46	8	+38	10	Promoted to the 2007 Division I
2	Croatia	5	3	0	2	22	15	+7	6	
3	South Korea	5	2	1	2	20	15	+5	5	
4	Serbia and Montenegro	5	2	1	2	14	16	−2	5	
5	Mexico	5	1	0	4	11	40	−29	2	
6	China	5	1	0	4	12	31	−19	2	Relegated to the 2007 Division III

== Division III ==
The Division III Championship was played on January 3–9, 2006, in Elektrėnai and Kaunas, Lithuania.

Pos	Team	Pld	W	D	L	GF	GA	GD	Pts	Promotion
1	Lithuania	4	4	0	0	81	3	+78	8	Promoted to the 2007 Division II
2	Iceland	4	3	0	1	79	6	+73	6	Promoted to the 2007 Division II
3	Turkey	4	2	0	2	35	40	−5	4	
4	Bulgaria	4	1	0	3	26	32	−6	2	
5	Armenia	4	0	0	4	6	146	−140	0	
