= Lauri Tukonen =

Finnish ice hockey player

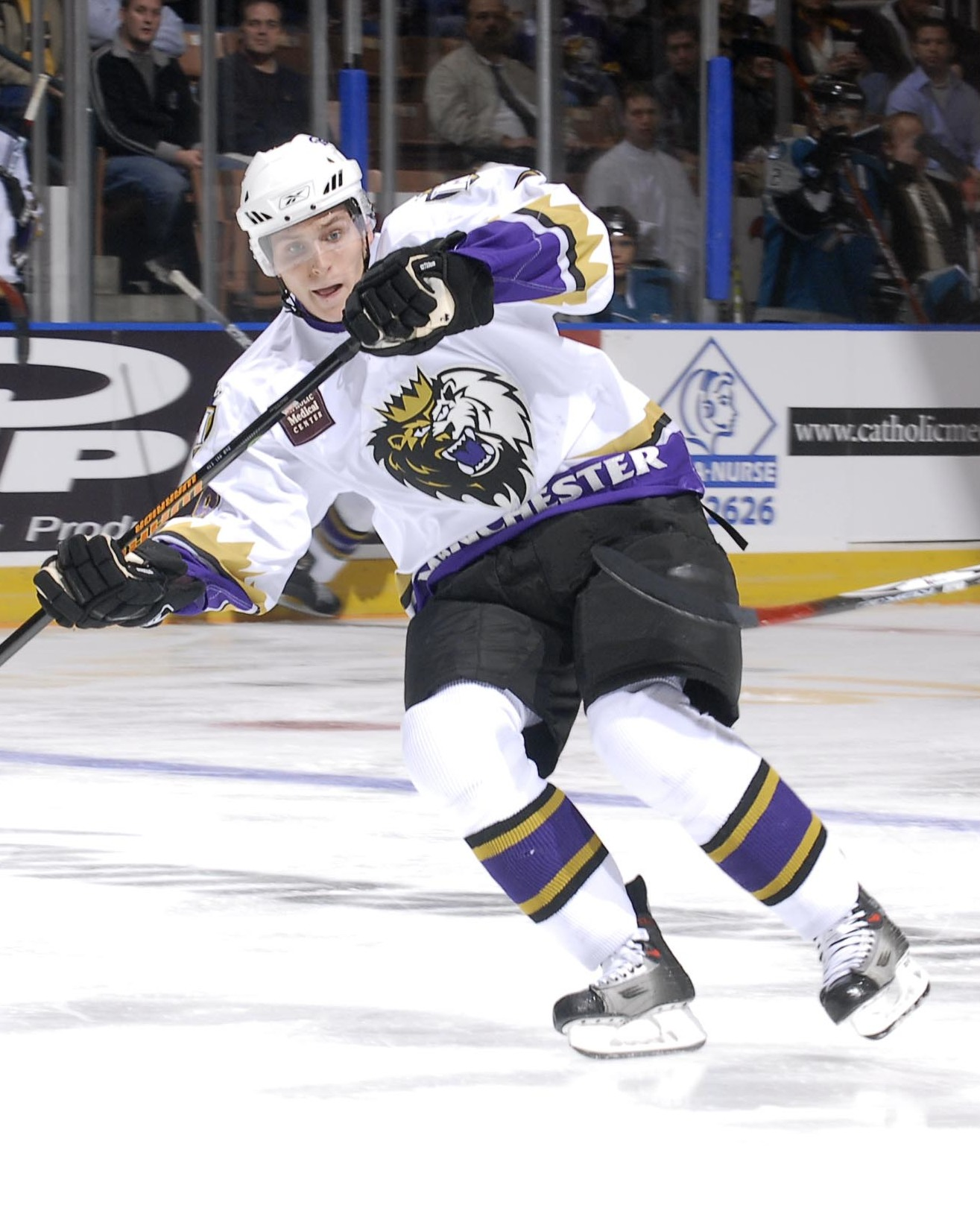
- Tukonen with the Manchester Monarchs in 2006
- Born: September 1, 1986 (age 40) Hyvinkää, Finland
- Height: 6 ft 2 in (188 cm)
- Weight: 198 lb (90 kg; 14 st 2 lb)
- Position: Right wing
- Shot: Right
- Liiga team Former teams: Lukko; Espoo Blues; Los Angeles Kings; Ilves; TPS
- NHL draft: 11th overall, 2004; Los Angeles Kings
- Playing career: 2003–2020

Lauri Tukonen (born September 1, 1986) is a Finnish professional ice hockey player. Tukonen has played in North America for the Los Angeles Kings organization and is a former member of Finnish clubs, Espoo Blues, Ilves and TPS. He is currently a player development coach for the Calgary Flames organization.

== Playing career ==
Lauri Tukonen was selected by the Los Angeles Kings as their first pick, 11th overall, in the 2004 NHL entry draft. He started his pro career with the Blues in the Finnish SM-liiga. During the 2003–04 season, he was the youngest player in the league, at 17 years old.

He then played for the Manchester Monarchs in the AHL, earning a promotion when he was recalled to the Los Angeles Kings on February 21, 2007, and played his first NHL game a day later against the Vancouver Canucks. He was sent back to Manchester on February 23 and was then recalled again on February 17, 2008, where he was later sent back on February 21. In March 2008 he became an alternate captain of the Monarchs.

On July 21, 2008, he was traded to the Dallas Stars in exchange for Richard Clune. He played in his native Finland during the start of the 2008–09 season with Ilves Tampere. Five months later on November 30, 2008, he was traded by the Stars to the Tampa Bay Lightning for Andrew Hutchinson.

== International play ==
Medal record

Representing Finland

Ice hockey

World Junior Championships
| Bronze medal – third place | 2004 Helsinki | |
| Bronze medal – third place | 2006 Vancouver | |

Tukonen has represented Finland at several World Junior Hockey Championship tournaments, winning a bronze medal at the 2004 World Junior Ice Hockey Championships.

His performance at the 2004 World U18 Championships bolstered his draft prospects, when he tied for first in scoring with 11 points and tied for first in assists with 6 assists. He led Team Finland in scoring, along with teammates Lauri Korpikoski and Petteri Nokelainen, also with 11 points each.

Tukonen scored the game-winner to collect another bronze at the 2006 World Junior Ice Hockey Championships, where he placed third on the tournament top scorers' list, second in assists, and second in plus-minus rating.

== Awards ==
- Bronze medal at the World Junior Championships in 2004 and 2006.
- Named to the World Junior Championships Media All-Star Team in 2006.

== Career statistics ==
=== Regular season and playoffs ===
| | | | Regular season | | | | | Playoffs |
| Season | Team | League | GP | G | A | Pts | PIM | GP | G | A | Pts | PIM |
|---|---|---|---|---|---|---|---|---|---|---|---|---|
| 2001–02 | Ahmat | FIN U16 | 5 | 4 | 6 | 10 | 2 | 5 | 3 | 5 | 8 | 2 |
| 2001–02 | Ahmat | FIN.2 | 24 | 7 | 4 | 11 | 6 | — | — | — | — | — |
| 2002–03 | Ahmat | FIN.2 U20 | 1 | 0 | 0 | 0 | 0 | — | — | — | — | — |
| 2002–03 | Ahmat | FIN.2 | 12 | 2 | 2 | 4 | 2 | — | — | — | — | — |
| 2002–03 | Blues | FIN U20 | 17 | 6 | 6 | 12 | 18 | 5 | 0 | 0 | 0 | 10 |
| 2003–04 | Blues | FIN U20 | 14 | 14 | 9 | 23 | 4 | — | — | — | — | — |
| 2003–04 | Blues | SM-l | 35 | 3 | 3 | 6 | 16 | 7 | 0 | 0 | 0 | 0 |
| 2004–05 | Blues | FIN U20 | 2 | 0 | 0 | 0 | 2 | — | — | — | — | — |
| 2004–05 | Blues | SM-l | 43 | 5 | 5 | 10 | 10 | — | — | — | — | — |
| 2005–06 | Manchester Monarchs | AHL | 62 | 14 | 22 | 36 | 20 | — | — | — | — | — |
| 2006–07 | Manchester Monarchs | AHL | 61 | 13 | 19 | 32 | 30 | 6 | 0 | 3 | 3 | 0 |
| 2006–07 | Los Angeles Kings | NHL | 4 | 0 | 0 | 0 | 0 | — | — | — | — | — |
| 2007–08 | Manchester Monarchs | AHL | 62 | 9 | 26 | 35 | 24 | 2 | 0 | 0 | 0 | 0 |
| 2007–08 | Los Angeles Kings | NHL | 1 | 0 | 0 | 0 | 0 | — | — | — | — | — |
| 2008–09 | Ilves | SM-l | 21 | 5 | 8 | 13 | 22 | — | — | — | — | — |
| 2008–09 | Lukko | SM-l | 14 | 3 | 5 | 8 | 2 | — | — | — | — | — |
| 2009–10 | Lukko | SM-l | 54 | 10 | 19 | 29 | 48 | 4 | 0 | 0 | 0 | 2 |
| 2010–11 | Lukko | SM-l | 40 | 17 | 17 | 34 | 77 | 10 | 2 | 6 | 8 | 10 |
| 2011–12 | Lukko | SM-l | 33 | 13 | 15 | 28 | 44 | — | — | — | — | — |
| 2012–13 | Lukko | SM-l | 20 | 6 | 5 | 11 | 26 | 12 | 1 | 3 | 4 | 16 |
| 2013–14 | Lukko | Liiga | 35 | 14 | 10 | 24 | 16 | 15 | 1 | 4 | 5 | 8 |
| 2014–15 | TPS | Liiga | 23 | 8 | 8 | 16 | 8 | — | — | — | — | — |
| 2015–16 | TPS | Liiga | 18 | 9 | 9 | 18 | 10 | — | — | — | — | — |
| 2016–17 | Lukko | Liiga | 16 | 5 | 5 | 10 | 6 | — | — | — | — | — |
| 2017–18 | Lukko | Liiga | 16 | 1 | 2 | 3 | 4 | — | — | — | — | — |
| 2018–19 | Ässät | Liiga | 7 | 3 | 0 | 3 | 18 | — | — | — | — | — |
| 2018–19 | Växjö Lakers | SHL | 8 | 1 | 2 | 3 | 0 | — | — | — | — | — |
| 2018–19 | EHC Kloten | SUI.2 | 5 | 3 | 3 | 6 | 2 | 4 | 0 | 0 | 0 | 0 |
| 2019–20 | TPS | Liiga | 5 | 0 | 0 | 0 | 2 | — | — | — | — | — |
| SM-l/Liiga totals | | | 380 | 102 | 111 | 213 | 309 | 48 | 4 | 13 | 17 | 36 |
| AHL totals | | | 185 | 36 | 67 | 103 | 74 | 8 | 0 | 3 | 3 | 0 |
| NHL totals | | | 5 | 0 | 0 | 0 | 0 | — | — | — | — | — |

=== International ===
| Year | Team | Event | Result | GP | G | A | Pts | PIM |
|---|---|---|---|---|---|---|---|---|
| 2004 | Finland | WJC | 3rd place, bronze medalist(s) | 7 | 2 | 1 | 3 | 2 |
| 2004 | Finland | WJC18 | 7th | 6 | 5 | 6 | 11 | 10 |
| 2005 | Finland | WJC | 5th | 6 | 1 | 1 | 2 | 2 |
| 2006 | Finland | WJC | 3rd place, bronze medalist(s) | 7 | 3 | 7 | 10 | 0 |
| Junior totals | | | | 26 | 11 | 15 | 26 | 14 |

| Preceded by Jeff Tambellini | Los Angeles Kings first-round draft pick 2004 | Succeeded by Anze Kopitar |
