= Petr Pohl =

Czech ice hockey player

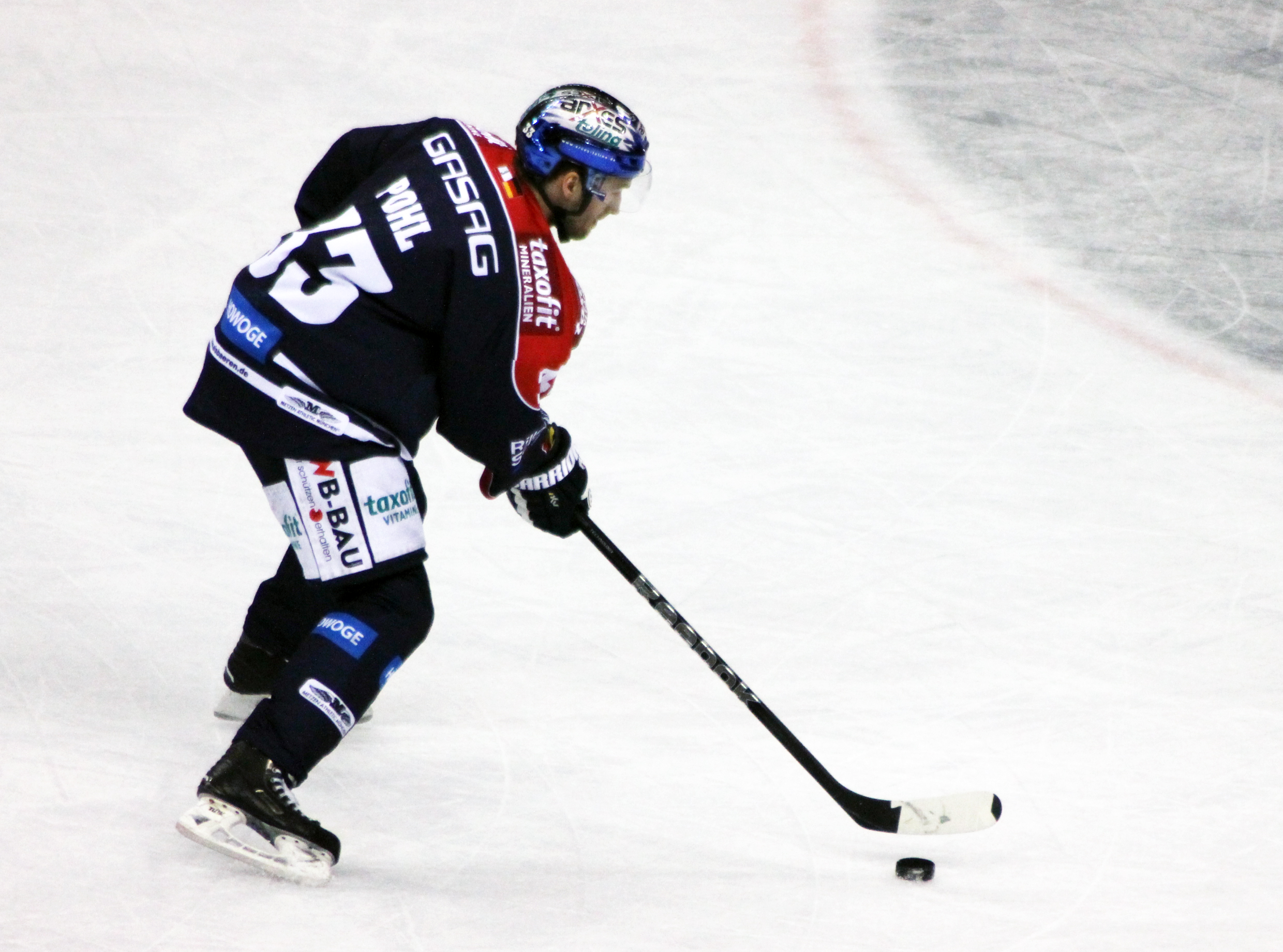
- Born: August 28, 1986 (age 39) Kopřivnice, Czechoslovakia
- Height: 5 ft 11 in (180 cm)
- Weight: 190 lb (86 kg; 13 st 8 lb)
- Position: Right wing
- Shoots: Right
- DEL team Former teams: Free Agent; Syracuse Crunch; SaiPa; HC Vítkovice; HC Karlovy Vary; Eisbären Berlin; ERC Ingolstadt; Thomas Sabo Ice Tigers; Grizzlys Wolfsburg
- NHL draft: 133rd overall, 2004; Columbus Blue Jackets
- Playing career: 2006–present

Petr Pohl (born August 28, 1986) is a Czech professional ice hockey player currently an unrestricted free agent. He was most recently under contract with the Grizzlys Wolfsburg of the Deutsche Eishockey Liga (DEL). He was selected by the Columbus Blue Jackets in the 5th round (133rd overall) of the 2004 NHL entry draft.

== Playing career ==
Pohl played with HC Vítkovice in the Czech Extraliga during the 2010–11 Czech Extraliga season. In the 2016–17 campaign, with ERC Ingolstadt in the Deutsche Eishockey Liga, Pohl added 23 points in 37 games before suffering a preliminary playoff loss to the Fischtown Pinguins to conclude his tenure with ERC.

On April 7, 2017, Pohl signed as a free agent to a three-year contract to remain in the DEL with the Thomas Sabo Ice Tigers.

Pohl transferred to the Grizzlys Wolfsburg in 2018–19 season, registering 7 goals and 13 points in 28 games, before leaving as a free agent on March 8, 2019.

== Career statistics ==
=== Regular season and playoffs ===
			Regular season					Playoffs
Season	Team	League	GP	G	A	Pts	PIM	GP	G	A	Pts	PIM
2000–01	HC Vítkovice	CZE U18	25	8	10	18	27	1	0	0	0	0
2001–02	HC Vítkovice	CZE U18	38	34	19	53	65	2	1	0	1	4
2001–02	HC Vítkovice	CZE U20	10	0	2	2	2	—	—	—	—	—
2002–03	HC Vítkovice	CZE U20	45	13	24	37	34	2	1	0	1	6
2003–04	Gatineau Olympiques	QMJHL	70	23	27	50	16	8	0	2	2	2
2004–05	Gatineau Olympiques	QMJHL	62	27	32	59	16	10	6	4	10	4
2005–06	Acadie–Bathurst Titan	QMJHL	62	27	43	70	44	17	6	10	16	12
2006–07	Syracuse Crunch	AHL	1	0	0	0	0	—	—	—	—	—
2006–07	Dayton Bombers	ECHL	65	8	16	24	18	18	3	3	6	10
2007–08	Syracuse Crunch	AHL	2	0	0	0	5	—	—	—	—	—
2007–08	Dayton Bombers	ECHL	7	1	8	9	0	2	0	1	1	4
2007–08	Youngstown SteelHounds	CHL	56	24	41	65	28	—	—	—	—	—
2008–09	Syracuse Crunch	AHL	6	1	2	3	0	—	—	—	—	—
2008–09	Johnstown Chiefs	ECHL	62	31	43	74	12	—	—	—	—	—
2009–10	SaiPa	SM-liiga	36	4	7	11	8	—	—	—	—	—
2009–10	Jukurit	Mestis	1	0	2	2	0	—	—	—	—	—
2010–11	HC Vítkovice Steel	ELH	52	19	20	39	20	16	2	5	7	18
2011–12	HC Vítkovice Steel	ELH	50	6	17	23	6	7	2	0	2	2
2012–13	HC Energie Karlovy Vary	ELH	49	8	8	16	10	—	—	—	—	—
2013–14	HC Energie Karlovy Vary	ELH	38	14	14	28	16	—	—	—	—	—
2014–15	Eisbären Berlin	DEL	52	21	24	45	14	3	1	2	3	2
2015–16	Eisbären Berlin	DEL	51	11	21	32	8	7	1	1	2	4
2016–17	ERC Ingolstadt	DEL	37	12	11	23	4	1	0	0	0	0
2017–18	Nürnberg Ice Tigers	DEL	50	8	8	16	24	6	0	0	0	0
2018–19	Grizzlys Wolfsburg	DEL	28	7	6	13	2	—	—	—	—	—
2019–20	Dresdner Eislöwen	DEL2	41	24	15	39	10	2	2	1	3	0
2020–21	Eispiraten Crimmitschau	DEL2	44	16	19	35	14	—	—	—	—	—
2021–22	ECDC Memmingen	GER.3	39	23	43	66	21	15	9	12	21	17
ELH totals			189	47	59	106	52	23	4	5	9	20
DEL totals			218	59	70	129	52	17	2	3	5	6

=== International ===
Year	Team	Event	GP	G	A	Pts	PIM
2006	Czech Republic	WJC	6	4	1	5	0
Junior totals			6	4	1	5	0
