= Teemu Laakso =

Finnish ice hockey player

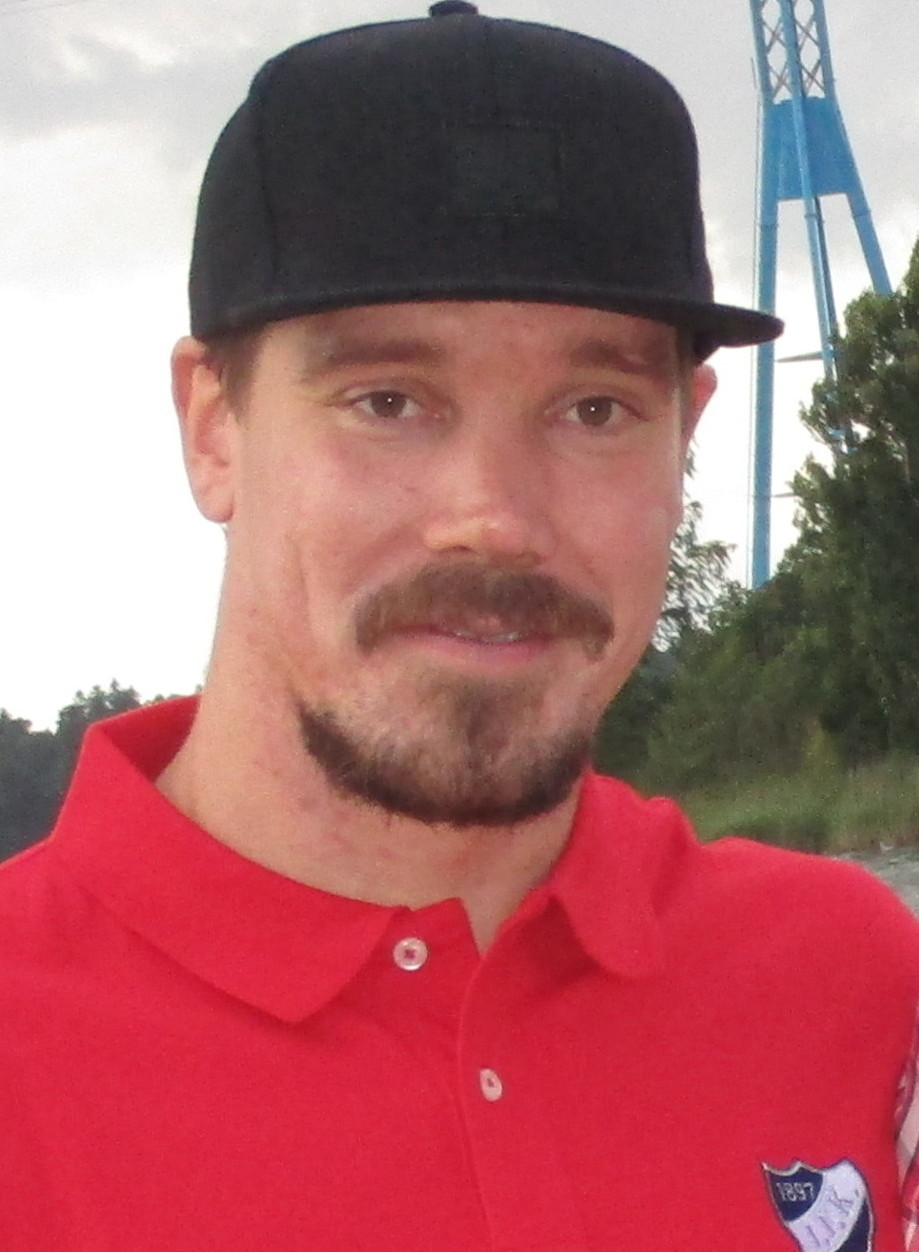
- Born: August 27, 1987 (age 38) Tuusula, Finland
- Height: 6 ft 1 in (185 cm)
- Weight: 218 lb (99 kg; 15 st 8 lb)
- Position: Defence
- Shot: Right
- Played for: HIFK; Nashville Predators; Severstal Cherepovets; Växjö Lakers
- National team: Finland
- NHL draft: 78th Overall, 2005; Nashville Predators
- Playing career: 2004–2018

Teemu Laakso (born August 27, 1987) is a Finnish former professional ice hockey defenceman. He began and finished his career with HIFK of the Liiga.

== Playing career ==
Laakso was drafted in the 3rd round (78th overall) by the Nashville Predators in the 2005 NHL entry draft. Laakso previously played for HIFK in Finland's SM-liiga. He has also played with Team Finland in two Under-18 world championships and three Under-20 world championships. Laakso was called up to Nashville during the 2011 Stanley Cup playoffs before their 2nd round series with the Vancouver Canucks.

On June 3, 2012, unable to establish himself in the NHL after four seasons within the Predators organization, Laakso left to sign a two-year contract with Russian team, Severstal Cherepovets.

== Career statistics ==
=== Regular season and playoffs ===
			Regular season					Playoffs
Season	Team	League	GP	G	A	Pts	PIM	GP	G	A	Pts	PIM
2002–03	KJT	FIN U18	18	2	5	7	24	—	—	—	—	—
2003–04	HIFK	FIN U20	41	3	6	9	20	3	0	1	1	0
2004–05	HIFK	FIN U20	20	5	4	9	18	—	—	—	—	—
2004–05	HIFK	SM-l	15	0	2	2	2	—	—	—	—	—
2004–05	HIFK	FIN U18	—	—	—	—	—	1	0	0	0	0
2005–06	HIFK	FIN U20	6	1	2	3	32	—	—	—	—	—
2005–06	HIFK	SM-l	47	2	1	3	20	8	1	0	1	0
2005–06	Suomi U20	Mestis	6	2	0	2	10	—	—	—	—	—
2006–07	HIFK	SM-l	50	3	6	9	70	5	0	1	1	0
2006–07	Suomi U20	Mestis	2	0	1	1	4	—	—	—	—	—
2007–08	HIFK	SM-l	53	3	7	10	40	7	0	0	0	2
2008–09	Milwaukee Admirals	AHL	42	2	7	9	50	—	—	—	—	—
2009–10	Milwaukee Admirals	AHL	46	4	9	13	42	7	1	2	3	4
2009–10	Nashville Predators	NHL	7	0	0	0	2	—	—	—	—	—
2010–11	Milwaukee Admirals	AHL	74	8	22	30	46	8	1	1	2	0
2010–11	Nashville Predators	NHL	1	0	0	0	0	—	—	—	—	—
2011–12	Nashville Predators	NHL	9	0	0	0	8	—	—	—	—	—
2011–12	Milwaukee Admirals	AHL	55	3	17	20	74	3	0	2	2	2
2012–13	Severstal Cherepovets	KHL	49	4	5	9	28	10	0	2	2	22
2013–14	Severstal Cherepovets	KHL	28	3	3	6	50	—	—	—	—	—
2014–15	Växjö Lakers	SHL	40	2	7	9	22	13	2	0	2	8
2015–16	Växjö Lakers	SHL	28	3	6	9	24	2	0	0	0	8
2016–17	Växjö Lakers	SHL	2	0	0	0	2	—	—	—	—	—
2017–18	HIFK	Liiga	5	0	0	0	4	—	—	—	—	—
Liiga totals			170	8	16	24	136	20	1	1	2	2
AHL totals			217	17	55	72	212	18	2	5	7	6
NHL totals			17	0	0	0	10	—	—	—	—	—

Medal record

Representing Finland

Ice hockey

World Junior Championships
Bronze medal – third place	2006 Vancouver	

=== International ===
Year	Team	Event	Result	GP	G	A	Pts	PIM
2004	Finland	WJC18	7th	6	2	4	6	18
2005	Finland	WJC	5th	5	0	1	1	10
2005	Finland	WJC18	7th	6	0	0	0	8
2006	Finland	WJC	3rd place, bronze medalist(s)	7	3	1	4	12
2007	Finland	WJC	6th	6	3	2	5	52
2013	Finland	WC	4th	10	0	2	2	0
Junior totals				30	8	8	16	100
Senior totals				10	0	2	2	0

== Awards and honours ==
Award	Year
SHL
Le Mat Trophy (Växjö Lakers)	2015
