= Nikolai Lemtyugov =

Russian ice hockey player

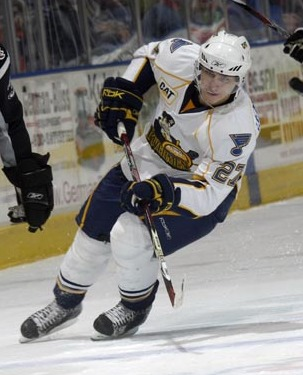
- Lemtyugov with the Peoria Rivermen in 2007
- Born: January 15, 1986 (age 40) Miass, Soviet Union
- Height: 6 ft 0 in (183 cm)
- Weight: 212 lb (96 kg; 15 st 2 lb)
- Position: Left wing
- Shot: Left
- Played for: CSKA Moscow; Severstal Cherepovets; Ak Bars Kazan; Metallurg Magnitogorsk; Neftekhimik Nizhnekamsk; Atlant Moscow Oblast; Traktor Chelyabinsk; HC Sibir Novosibirsk; HC Spartak Moscow; HC Ugra; Avangard Omsk; KHL Medveščak Zagreb; Anyang Halla; Sheffield Steelers
- NHL draft: 219th Overall, 2005; St. Louis Blues
- Playing career: 2004–2020

Nikolai Lemtyugov (Russian: Николай Александрович Лемтюгов; born 15 January 1986) is a Russian former professional ice hockey player. His career, which lasted from 2004 to 2020, was mainly spent in the Russian Superleague and the Kontinental Hockey League.

== Playing career ==
Lemtyugov was drafted 219th overall in the 2005 NHL entry draft by the St. Louis Blues. Nikolay spent time in the Russian Super League before coming to North America for the 2007–08 season and playing for the Peoria Rivermen, affiliate of the Blues. On December 15, 2008, it was reported that Lemtyugov had quit the Rivermen and was signed to a multi-year deal with Severstal Cherepovets.

In July 2019, Lemtyugov moved to the UK to sign for Sheffield Steelers, reuniting with his former coach Aaron Fox in the process.

== Career statistics ==
=== Regular season and playoffs ===
			Regular season					Playoffs
Season	Team	League	GP	G	A	Pts	PIM	GP	G	A	Pts	PIM
2000–01	CSKA–2 Moscow	RUS-3	2	0	0	0	0	—	—	—	—	—
2001–02	CSKA–2 Moscow	RUS-3	10	4	3	7	2	—	—	—	—	—
2002–03	CSKA–2 Moscow	RUS-3	18	3	11	14	10	—	—	—	—	—
2003–04	CSKA–2 Moscow	RUS-3	63	29	27	56	54	—	—	—	—	—
2004–05	CSKA Moscow	RSL	11	1	1	2	16	—	—	—	—	—
2004–05	CSKA–2 Moscow	RUS-3	37	21	20	41	90	—	—	—	—	—
2005–06	CSKA Moscow	RSL	37	9	11	20	45	7	1	1	2	8
2005–06	CSKA–2 Moscow	RUS-3	3	2	5	7	10	—	—	—	—	—
2006–07	Severstal Cherepovets	RSL	52	11	8	19	50	5	0	1	1	8
2007–08	Peoria Rivermen	AHL	69	22	15	37	71	—	—	—	—	—
2008–09	Peoria Rivermen	AHL	27	5	14	19	20	—	—	—	—	—
2008–09	Severstal Cherepovets	KHL	21	7	4	11	8	—	—	—	—	—
2008–09	Severstal–2 Cherepovets	RUS-3	—	—	—	—	—	12	12	14	26	12
2009–10	Severstal Cherepovets	KHL	39	9	14	23	22	—	—	—	—	—
2009–10	Ak Bars Kazan	KHL	4	0	0	0	8	—	—	—	—	—
2010–11	Ak Bars Kazan	KHL	39	9	7	16	65	—	—	—	—	—
2010–11	Neftyanik Almetievsk	VHL	—	—	—	—	—	15	8	2	10	30
2011–12	Ak Bars Kazan	KHL	15	6	2	8	14	—	—	—	—	—
2011–12	Metallurg Magnitogorsk	KHL	13	1	3	4	2	—	—	—	—	—
2011–12	Neftekhimik Nizhnekamsk	KHL	15	3	4	7	0	—	—	—	—	—
2012–13	Atlant Moscow Oblast	KHL	33	10	3	13	14	—	—	—	—	—
2012–13	Traktor Chelyabinsk	KHL	5	0	0	0	6	2	0	0	0	0
2013–14	Sibir Novosibirsk	KHL	33	7	4	11	22	—	—	—	—	—
2013–14	Spartak Moscow	KHL	11	3	5	8	12	—	—	—	—	—
2014–15	Avangard Omsk	KHL	21	1	2	3	21	—	—	—	—	—
2014–15	Sokol Krasnoyarsk	VHL	4	1	1	2	2	—	—	—	—	—
2014–15	HC Yugra	KHL	18	0	3	3	27	—	—	—	—	—
2015–16	Avangard Omsk	KHL	56	11	7	18	48	11	4	1	5	0
2016–17	Avangard Omsk	KHL	52	19	12	31	48	12	3	6	9	14
2017–18	Avangard Omsk	KHL	13	0	3	3	4	3	0	1	1	0
2018–19	KHL Medveščak Zagreb	AUT	15	4	7	11	12	—	—	—	—	—
2018–19	Anyang Halla	ALIH	11	3	5	8	10	4	2	1	3	28
2019–20	Sheffield Steelers	EIHL	49	15	27	42	56	—	—	—	—	—
RSL totals			100	21	20	41	111	12	1	2	3	16
KHL totals			388	86	72	158	321	28	7	8	15	14

=== International ===
Year	Team	Event	GP	G	A	Pts	PIM
2006	Russia	WJC	6	4	1	5	0
Junior totals			6	4	1	5	0
