= Aki Seitsonen =

Finnish ice hockey player

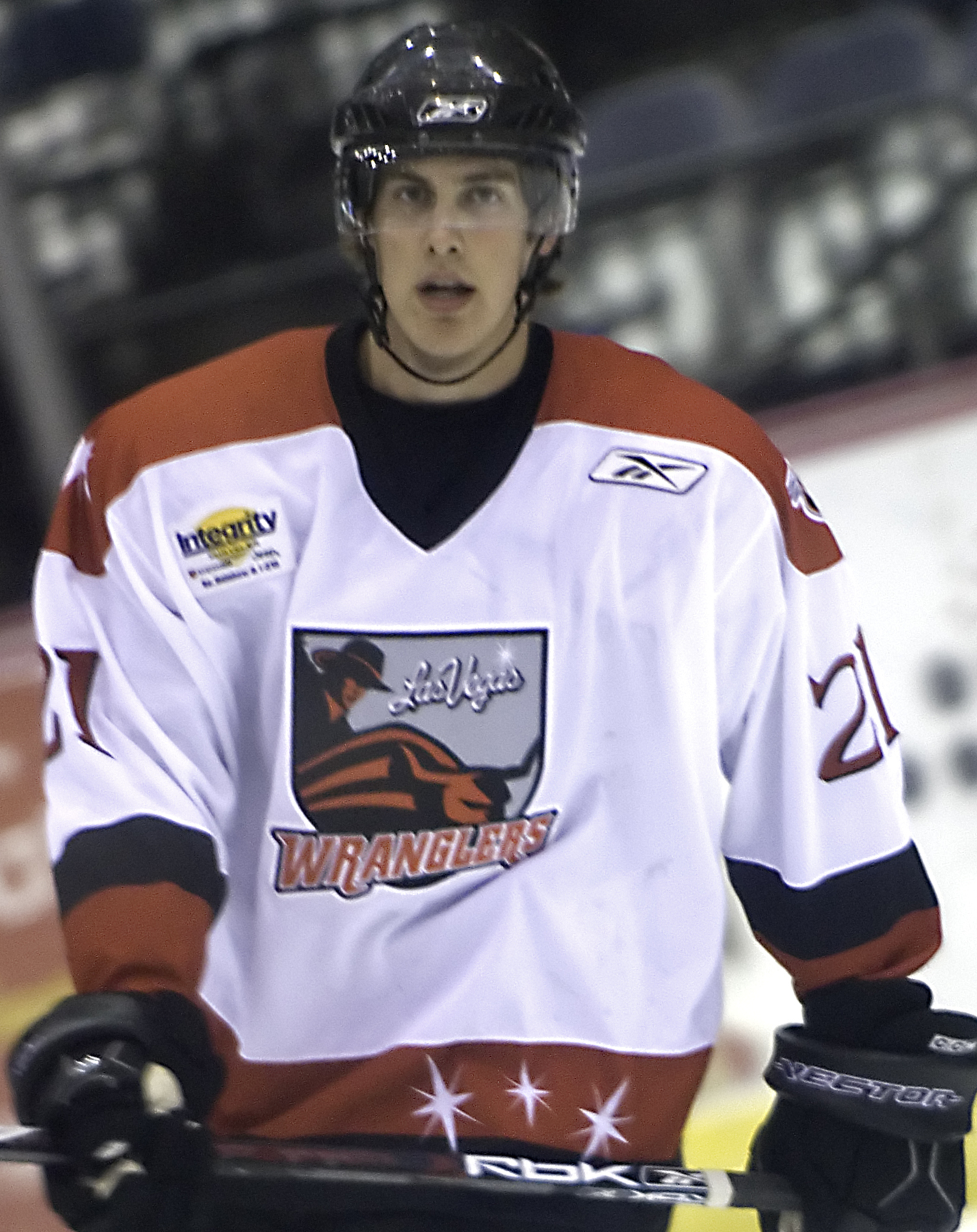
- Seitsonen playing with the Las Vegas Wranglers in 2007
- Born: February 5, 1986 (age 40) Riihimäki, Finland
- Height: 6 ft 2 in (188 cm)
- Weight: 192 lb (87 kg; 13 st 10 lb)
- Position: Centre
- Shot: Right
- Played for: SM-liiga; HPK; Lukko; AHL; Omaha Ak-Sar-Ben Knights; Quad City Flames; ECHL; Las Vegas Wranglers; Idaho Steelheads
- NHL draft: 108th overall, 2004; Calgary Flames
- Playing career: 2006–2013

Aki Seitsonen (born February 5, 1986) is a Finnish former professional ice hockey player. He was selected by the Calgary Flames in the 4th round (108th overall) of the 2004 NHL entry draft.

Seitsonen played in the SM-liiga with both HPK and Lukko during the 2009–10.

== Career statistics ==
=== Regular season and playoffs ===
			Regular season					Playoffs
Season	Team	League	GP	G	A	Pts	PIM	GP	G	A	Pts	PIM
2002–03	HPK	FIN U18	28	15	18	33	6	2	1	1	2	0
2003–04	Prince Albert Raiders	WHL	71	16	24	40	18	5	0	0	0	0
2004–05	Prince Albert Raiders	WHL	67	24	28	52	14	17	5	9	14	10
2005–06	Prince Albert Raiders	WHL	66	20	15	35	22	—	—	—	—	—
2005–06	Omaha Ak–Sar–Ben Knights	AHL	7	0	0	0	2	—	—	—	—	—
2006–07	Omaha Ak–Sar–Ben Knights	AHL	13	1	3	4	0	—	—	—	—	—
2006–07	Las Vegas Wranglers	ECHL	59	14	18	32	16	5	0	2	2	2
2007–08	Las Vegas Wranglers	ECHL	70	18	18	36	14	21	7	3	10	4
2008–09	Quad City Flames	AHL	45	4	2	6	10	—	—	—	—	—
2009–10	HPK	SM-liiga	13	0	0	0	0	—	—	—	—	—
2009–10	Lukko	SM-liiga	13	0	1	1	2	—	—	—	—	—
2009–10	LeKi	Mestis	9	1	4	5	0	—	—	—	—	—
2010–11	Idaho Steelheads	ECHL	50	16	16	32	12	9	0	0	0	0
2011–12	Lloydminster Border Kings	ChHL	6	1	3	4	2	2	1	1	2	0
2011–12	Shellbrook Elks	FCHL	12	10	11	21	0	11	12	27	39	2
2011–12	Lloydminster Border Kings	AC	—	—	—	—	—	3	1	0	1	0
2012–13	Shellbrook Elks	FCHL	19	14	35	49	2	8	2	5	7	4
AHL totals			65	5	5	10	12	—	—	—	—	—
ECHL totals			179	48	52	100	42	35	7	5	12	6

=== International ===
Year	Team	Event	GP	G	A	Pts	PIM
2005	Finland	WJC	6	1	0	1	0
2006	Finland	WJC	7	4	2	6	4
Junior totals			13	5	2	7	4
