= 2011–12 Elitserien suspensions and fines =

Swedish ice hockey league season infractions

The following is a list of all suspensions and fines enforced in the Elitserien during the 2011–12 Elitserien season. It lists which players or coaches of what team have been punished for which offense and the amount of punishment they have received. Note that a value of "N/A" in the "Length" or "Fine" column indicates that the player or coach was not suspended or fined for the particular incident. If a particular suspension lasts longer than a month, no fines are imposed. Each suspension covers not only Elitserien games but also ice hockey in general – for example, international tournaments such as the Euro Hockey Tour or the European Trophy. However, this article only mentions the number of Elitserien games each suspension covers. Note that the two suspensions on 1 November and the two suspensions on 7 November 2011 are unrelated to each other.

Date	Name	Team	Offense	Length	Fine
23 September 2011	Jimmie Ölvestad	Djurgårdens IF	Elbow to the head of Mattias Persson.	3 games	15,000 SEK
28 September 2011	Christian Söderström	Skellefteå AIK	Blindside hit to the head of Adam Almqvist.	3 games	11,000 SEK
7 October 2011	Simon Bertilsson	Brynäs IF	Blindside hit on Jonas Berglund.	4 games	15,000 SEK
13 October 2011	Morten Madsen	Modo Hockey	Blindside hit to the head of Sebastian Lauritzen.	4 games	11,000 SEK
14 October 2011	Hannes Hyvönen	Färjestad BK	Illegal hit to the head of Per Hallin to the boards.	3 games	14,000 SEK
16 October 2011	Jonathan Granström	Brynäs IF	Illegal check to the head of Robin Figren.	2 games	N/A
21 October 2011	Jonas Frögren	Färjestad BK	Illegal check to the head of Max Friberg to the boards.	3 games	20,000 SEK
1 November 2011	Janne Karlsson (coach)	Växjö Lakers HC	Inappropriate gesture.	N/A	18,000 SEK
1 November 2011	Martin Ševc	Färjestad BK	Hate speech against Daniel Rahimi.	2 games	20,000 SEK
4 November 2011	Nicklas Danielsson	Modo Hockey	Illegal check to the head of Joel Lundqvist.	2 games	11,000 SEK
7 November 2011	Sanny Lindström	Färjestad BK	Illegal hit to the head of Janos Hari.	2 games	20,000 SEK
7 November 2011	Sebastian Karlsson	Linköpings HC	Illegal check to the head of Magnus Kahnberg.	11 games	N/A
24 November 2011	Andreas Jämtin	Linköpings HC	Illegal elbow on Daniel Mannberg.	2 games	20,000 SEK
2 December 2011	Joel Lundqvist	Frölunda HC	Illegal hit to the head of Ole-Kristian Tollefsen.	2 games	N/A
5 December 2011	Martin Laumann Ylven	Linköpings HC	Attempting to attack Per Ledin following game misconduct penalty on Ylven.	2 games	5,000 SEK
30 December 2011	Jari Tolsa	Frölunda HC	Running over a linesman.	2 games	9,000 SEK
13 January 2012	Jari Tolsa	Frölunda HC	Elbow to the head of Daniel Tjärnqvist.	2 games	9,000 SEK
13 January 2012	Marcus Nilson	Djurgårdens IF	Punching a linesman.	2 games	N/A
20 January 2012	Noah Welch	HV71	Illegal hit to the head of Dick Axelsson.	2 games	15,000 SEK
1 February 2012	Joakim Lindström	Skellefteå AIK	Illegal hit to the head of Marcus Paulsson.	3 games	40,000 SEK
5 February 2012	Nichlas Torp	Timrå IK	Blindside hit to the head of Sebastian Collberg.	4 games	21,000 SEK
22 February 2012	Chris Abbott	Luleå HF	Illegal checking from behind on Jesper Thörnberg.	3 games	40,000 SEK
13 March 2012	Chris Abbott	Luleå HF	Illegal checking from behind on Rastislav Pavlikovsky.	3 games	40,000 SEK
29 March 2012	Hannes Hyvönen	Färjestad BK	Elbow to the head of Simon Bertilsson.	4 games	26,000 SEK
