= Fredrik Pettersson =

Swedish ice hockey player

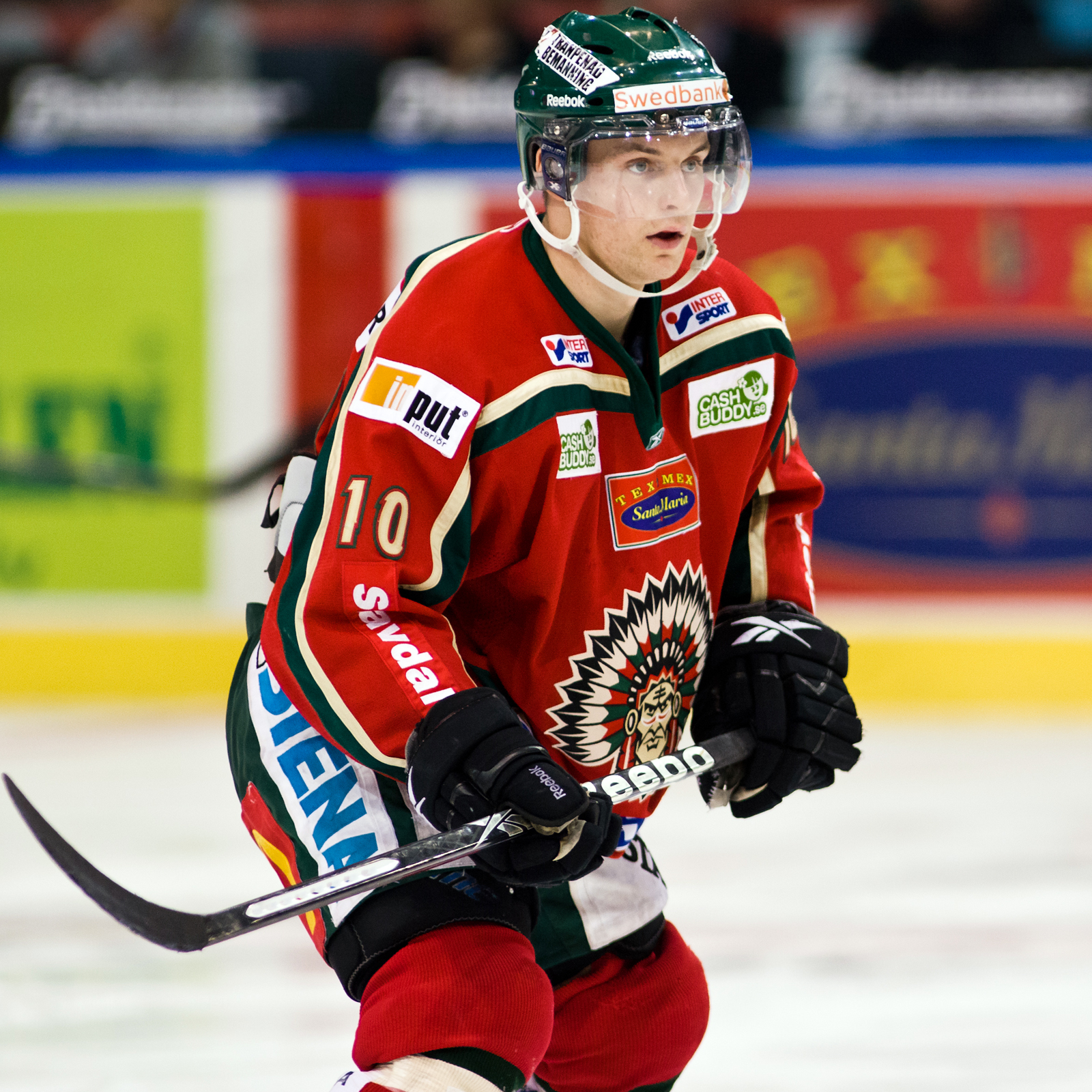
- Pettersson with Frölunda HC in 2009.
- Born: June 10, 1987 (age 39) Gothenburg, Sweden
- Height: 5 ft 10 in (178 cm)
- Weight: 179 lb (81 kg; 12 st 11 lb)
- Position: Right wing
- Shot: Right
- Played for: Frölunda HC; Chicago Wolves; HC Donbass; HC Lugano; Torpedo Nizhny Novgorod; HC Dinamo Minsk; ZSC Lions
- National team: Sweden
- NHL draft: 158th overall, 2005; Edmonton Oilers
- Playing career: 2007–2021

John Fredrik Michael Pettersson (born June 10, 1987) is a Swedish former professional ice hockey right winger. He last played for the ZSC Lions in the National League (NL). He previously played for Torpedo Nizhny Novgorod and HC Donbass in the Kontinental Hockey League, HC Lugano in the National League (NL) and Frölunda HC in Sweden. He played with the Swedish national team on several occasions and was a member of gold and bronze medal winning squads at the World Hockey Championship.

== Playing career ==
=== Junior ===
A native of Gothenburg, Sweden, Pettersson played junior hockey in his hometown for Frölunda HC's Under-18 and J20 SuperElit teams between 2002 and 2005. Pettersson described himself as being an "energy player", using his skating ability and hard work to help his team. He was a member of Frölunda teams that won the J18 gold medal in 2003, 2004 and 2005, and also won gold with the J20 team in 2005.

The Edmonton Oilers selected Pettersson in the fifth round of the 2005 National Hockey League (NHL) Entry Draft, 157th overall. He chose to complete his junior career in North America. He joined the Western Hockey League (WHL)'s Calgary Hitmen, who selected him with the 48th pick in the 2005 Canadian Hockey League import draft. Pettersson adapted quickly; he scored 10 goals and 17 points in his first 19 WHL games, en route to a 22-goal, 43-point season in 2005–06. He improved to 50 points in 2006–07, but after the Oilers declined to sign him to an NHL contract, Pettersson returned to Sweden to begin his professional career.

=== Professional ===
Pettersson returned to Frölunda HC on a one-year contract for the 2007–08 Elitserien season. He made his professional debut and scored his first goal on September 24, 2007, against HV71. A 13 point rookie season earned Pettersson a contract extension, and he doubled his offensive output to 26 points in 2008–09. He scored 20 goals and improved to 38 points in 58 games in 2009–10. After playing only 7–10 minutes per game in his first season, his improvements saw him playing as much as 25 minutes per night by his third. He caught the attention of the Atlanta Thrashers, who convinced Pettersson to return to North America and take a second chance at making the NHL and signed him to a contract. He failed to make the Thrashers' roster, and was assigned to their American Hockey League (AHL) affiliate, the Chicago Wolves for the 2010–11 season. He scored 11 goals and 32 points in 67 games for Chicago before again returning to Frölunda.

Pettersson recorded a career high 40 points in his return season with Frölunda in 2011–12 before moving to the Kontinental Hockey League (KHL), signing with Ukrainian club HC Donbass for its inaugural season in Europe's top hockey league. Appearing in 47 games with Donbass in 2012–13, Pettersson scored 7 goals and added 6 assists.

He signed with HC Lugano of Switzerland’s top-flight NLA in November 2013. In 2014-15, his first full season with Lugano, Pettersson produced 33 goals and 36 assists in 49 games to lead the league in scoring. He received NLA Forward of the Year honors that season.

He started the 2016-17 season with Torpedo Nizhny Novgorod of the Kontinental Hockey League and transferred to fellow KHL side Dinamo Minsk in December 2016.

== International play ==
Medal record

Representing Sweden

Ice hockey

World Championship
Gold medal – first place	2013 Sweden/Finland	
Bronze medal – third place	2010 Germany	

World U18 Championship
Bronze medal – third place	2005 Czech Republic	

As a junior, Pettersson made three appearances with the Swedish under-20 team. He was a member of the under-18 squad that won the bronze medal at the 2005 IIHF World U18 Championships, and helped guide the Swedes to fifth and fourth place finishes in the 2006 and 2007 World Junior Hockey Championships. Pettersson made his first senior world championship appearance with the Swedish national team in 2010. He had two points in seven games for the bronze medal-winning Swedes.

He returned for the 2013 World Championship where he scored seven points in nine games. The Swedes defeated Switzerland, 5–1, in the final at Stockholm to become the first nation in 27 years to win the gold medal in their home country.

== Career statistics ==
=== Regular season and playoffs ===
			Regular season					Playoffs
Season	Team	League	GP	G	A	Pts	PIM	GP	G	A	Pts	PIM
2002–03	Västra Frölunda HC	J18 Allsv	12	5	7	12	6	5	2	1	3	8
2003–04	Västra Frölunda HC	J18 Allsv	14	13	8	21	6	7	6	3	9	8
2003–04	Västra Frölunda HC	J20	6	4	1	5	2	2	0	0	0	0
2004–05	Frölunda HC	J18 Allsv	2	1	2	3	10	6	4	5	9	10
2004–05	Frölunda HC	J20	24	9	8	17	32	6	5	3	8	16
2005–06	Calgary Hitmen	WHL	59	22	21	43	47	—	—	—	—	—
2006–07	Calgary Hitmen	WHL	52	21	29	50	50	—	—	—	—	—
2007–08	Frölunda HC	J20	2	1	0	1	0	—	—	—	—	—
2007–08	Frölunda HC	SEL	53	6	7	13	38	7	2	1	3	6
2008–09	Frölunda HC	SEL	53	8	18	26	67	10	5	1	6	4
2009–10	Frölunda HC	SEL	54	20	18	38	67	7	3	1	4	10
2010–11	Chicago Wolves	AHL	67	11	21	32	46	—	—	—	—	—
2011–12	Frölunda HC	SEL	54	16	24	40	58	6	1	2	3	6
2012–13	HC Donbass	KHL	47	7	6	13	41	—	—	—	—	—
2013–14	HC Donbass	KHL	5	0	0	0	2	—	—	—	—	—
2013–14	HC Lugano	NLA	20	7	12	19	2	5	1	3	4	4
2014–15	HC Lugano	NLA	49	33	36	69	38	6	2	3	5	2
2015–16	HC Lugano	NLA	50	26	22	48	52	10	2	9	11	4
2016–17	Torpedo Nizhny Novgorod	KHL	24	5	7	12	22	—	—	—	—	—
2016–17	Dinamo Minsk	KHL	18	8	10	18	16	1	0	0	0	0
2017–18	ZSC Lions	NL	46	26	24	50	58	17	7	8	15	33
2018–19	ZSC Lions	NL	38	12	15	27	26	—	—	—	—	—
2019–20	ZSC Lions	NL	43	14	21	35	22	—	—	—	—	—
2020–21	ZSC Lions	NL	25	8	4	12	16	—	—	—	—	—
SHL totals			214	50	67	117	230	30	11	5	16	26
KHL totals			94	20	23	43	81	1	0	0	0	0
NL totals			271	126	134	260	214	38	12	23	35	43

=== International ===
Year	Team	Event	Result	GP	G	A	Pts	PIM
2005	Sweden	WJC18	3rd place, bronze medalist(s)	7	1	2	3	6
2006	Sweden	WJC	5th	6	3	2	5	8
2007	Sweden	WJC	4th	6	1	1	2	8
2010	Sweden	WC	3rd place, bronze medalist(s)	7	1	1	2	4
2012	Sweden	WC	6th	1	0	0	0	0
2013	Sweden	WC	1st place, gold medalist(s)	9	3	4	7	4
2018	Sweden	OG	5th	4	0	0	0	0
Junior totals				19	5	5	10	22
Senior totals				21	4	5	9	8
