= Johan Ryno =

Swedish ice hockey player (born 1986)

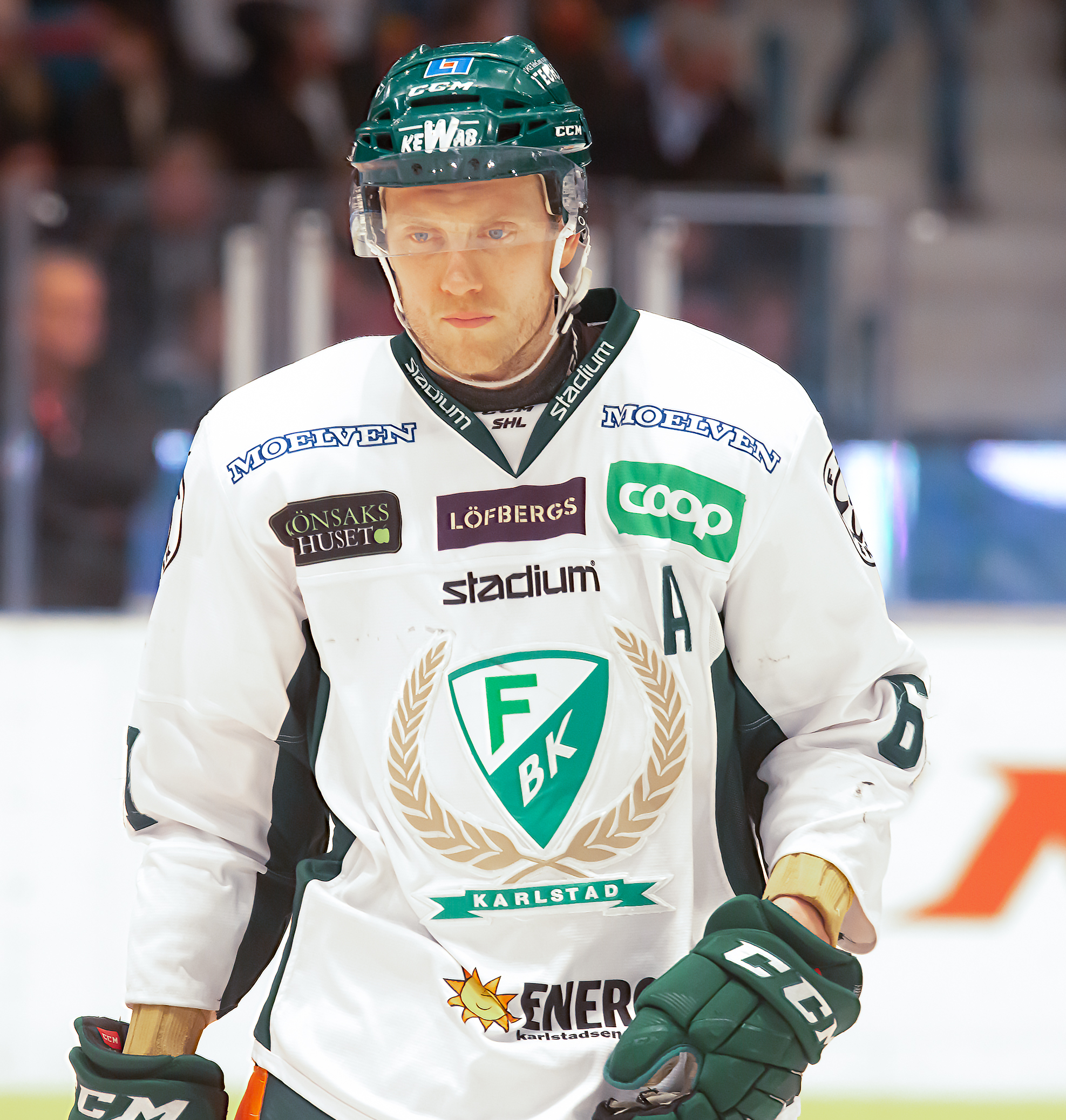
- Born: 5 June 1986 (age 39) Örebro, Sweden
- Height: 196 cm (6 ft 5 in)
- Weight: 98 kg (216 lb; 15 st 6 lb)
- Position: Right wing
- Shot: Left
- team Former teams: Free Agent; Frölunda HC; Timrå IK; Grand Rapids Griffins; Djurgårdens IF; AIK; Leksands IF; Färjestad BK; HC Lugano
- NHL draft: 137th overall, 2005; Detroit Red Wings
- Playing career: 2005–2020

Karl Johan Ryno (born 5 June 1986) is a Swedish former professional ice hockey player. He most recently played for HC Lugano in the National League (NL). Ryno was drafted 137th overall by the Detroit Red Wings in the 2005 NHL entry draft.

== Playing career ==
In 2007, he signed a three-year, entry-level contract with the Red Wings, but only played 12 games for the Grand Rapids Griffins of AHL, totalling 7 points. For the remainder of the contract, the Red Wings loaned Ryno to the Stockholm-based team Djurgårdens IF and later AIK. In 2010, he signed a two-year contract deal with IK Oskarshamn in the Swedish second-tier league. Ryno would later sign a contract with Leksands IF who would later gain entry via promotion to the SHL.

== Career statistics ==
=== Regular season and playoffs ===
| | | | Regular season | | | | | Playoffs |
| Season | Team | League | GP | G | A | Pts | PIM | GP | G | A | Pts | PIM |
|---|---|---|---|---|---|---|---|---|---|---|---|---|
| 2003–04 | IFK Hallsberg | SWE.3 | 28 | 9 | 18 | 27 | 30 | — | — | — | — | — |
| 2004–05 | IFK Kumla | SWE.3 | 29 | 20 | 18 | 38 | 14 | — | — | — | — | — |
| 2004–05 | IFK Arboga IK | Allsv | 2 | 0 | 0 | 0 | 0 | — | — | — | — | — |
| 2005–06 | IK Oskarshamn | Allsv | 34 | 13 | 10 | 23 | 64 | — | — | — | — | — |
| 2006–07 | Frölunda HC | J20 | 2 | 1 | 0 | 1 | 2 | — | — | — | — | — |
| 2006–07 | Frölunda HC | SEL | 14 | 0 | 0 | 0 | 14 | — | — | — | — | — |
| 2006–07 | AIK | Allsv | 14 | 2 | 7 | 9 | 14 | — | — | — | — | — |
| 2006–07 | Timrå IK | SEL | 25 | 5 | 6 | 11 | 8 | 5 | 0 | 1 | 1 | 0 |
| 2007–08 | Grand Rapids Griffins | AHL | 12 | 3 | 4 | 7 | 8 | — | — | — | — | — |
| 2007–08 | Djurgårdens IF | SEL | 30 | 2 | 7 | 9 | 18 | 5 | 0 | 0 | 0 | 0 |
| 2008–09 | AIK | Allsv | 21 | 5 | 8 | 13 | 18 | 9 | 3 | 5 | 8 | 4 |
| 2009–10 | AIK | Allsv | 47 | 9 | 11 | 20 | 34 | 10 | 1 | 4 | 5 | 4 |
| 2010–11 | IK Oskarshamn | Allsv | 50 | 18 | 28 | 46 | 54 | — | — | — | — | — |
| 2011–12 | Leksands IF | Allsv | 49 | 19 | 17 | 36 | 24 | 10 | 1 | 5 | 6 | 12 |
| 2012–13 | Leksands IF | Allsv | 52 | 20 | 24 | 44 | 79 | 10 | 1 | 9 | 10 | 6 |
| 2013–14 | Leksands IF | SHL | 50 | 10 | 23 | 33 | 28 | 3 | 2 | 1 | 3 | 4 |
| 2014–15 | Leksands IF | SHL | 49 | 14 | 24 | 38 | 36 | — | — | — | — | — |
| 2015–16 | Färjestad BK | SHL | 44 | 5 | 12 | 17 | 12 | 5 | 1 | 1 | 2 | 2 |
| 2016–17 | Färjestad BK | SHL | 47 | 16 | 20 | 36 | 28 | 4 | 0 | 3 | 3 | 12 |
| 2017–18 | Färjestad BK | SHL | 46 | 9 | 37 | 46 | 28 | 6 | 1 | 3 | 4 | 6 |
| 2018–19 | Färjestad BK | SHL | 45 | 14 | 15 | 29 | 57 | 14 | 4 | 7 | 11 | 6 |
| 2019–20 | Färjestad BK | SHL | 30 | 4 | 11 | 15 | 12 | — | — | — | — | — |
| 2019–20 | HC Lugano | NL | 1 | 0 | 0 | 0 | 0 | — | — | — | — | — |
| Allsv totals | | | 269 | 86 | 105 | 191 | 287 | 39 | 6 | 23 | 29 | 26 |
| SHL totals | | | 380 | 79 | 155 | 234 | 241 | 42 | 8 | 16 | 24 | 30 |

=== International ===
| Year | Team | Event | Result | GP | G | A | Pts | PIM |
|---|---|---|---|---|---|---|---|---|
| 2006 | Sweden | WJC | 5th | 6 | 2 | 3 | 5 | 4 |
| Junior totals | | | | 6 | 2 | 3 | 5 | 4 |
