= Chris Bourque =

American ice hockey player (born 1986)

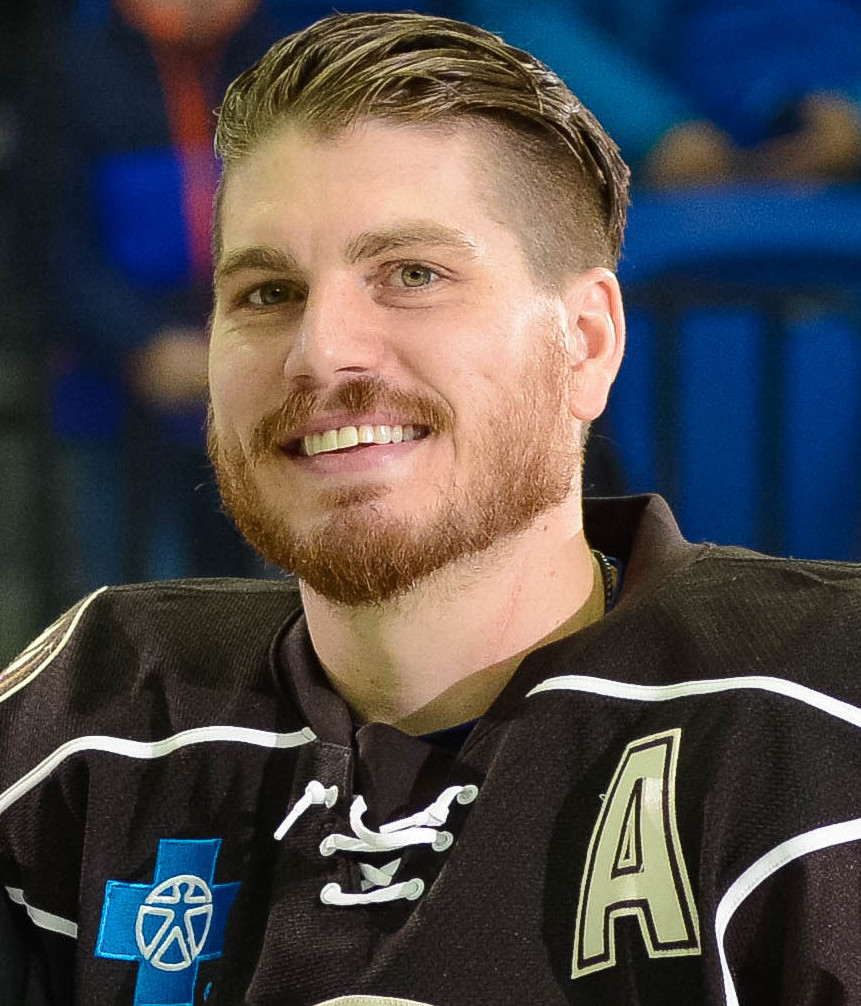
- Bourque in 2018
- Born: January 29, 1986 (age 40) Boston, Massachusetts, U.S.
- Height: 5 ft 8 in (173 cm)
- Weight: 181 lb (82 kg; 12 st 13 lb)
- Position: Left wing
- Shot: Left
- Played for: Washington Capitals; Pittsburgh Penguins; Atlant Moscow Oblast; HC Lugano; Boston Bruins; Ak Bars Kazan; EHC Biel; EHC München; ERC Ingolstadt
- National team: United States
- NHL draft: 33rd overall, 2004; Washington Capitals
- Playing career: 2005–2022

Christopher Ray Bourque (born January 29, 1986) is a Canadian-American former professional ice hockey forward. Originally drafted by the Washington Capitals of the National Hockey League (NHL), he has played 51 NHL games for the Capitals, the Pittsburgh Penguins and the Boston Bruins. Bourque currently serves as a free agent scout for the Toronto Maple Leafs.

== Playing career ==
Bourque was born in Boston but grew up in Topsfield, Massachusetts, and graduated from Cushing Academy in 2004. While there, he was close friends with Keith Yandle. He played college hockey in the NCAA during the 2004-2005 season for the Boston University Terriers. He was drafted 33rd overall in the 2004 NHL entry draft by the Washington Capitals, and played for the Portland Pirates and Hershey Bears of the American Hockey League (AHL) before being called up to the NHL in November 2007. He played four NHL games total before being reassigned to Hershey in February 2008.

Bourque scored his first NHL goal on December 30, 2008, against the Buffalo Sabres. In the 2009–10 season, he was claimed off of waivers by the Pittsburgh Penguins on September 30, 2009, and recorded his first NHL assist on October 28, 2009 in a 6–1 win over the Montreal Canadiens. On December 5, 2009, he was waived by the Penguins and re-claimed by his former team, the Washington Capitals. He was then assigned back to the Bears where he remained for the majority of the season. In helping the Bears capture their second successive Calder Cup, Bourque led the league in scoring with 27 post-season points to win the Jack A. Butterfield Trophy as Calder Cup Playoff MVP in 2010.

In mid-July 2010, Bourque failed to sign the qualifying offer extended by Washington and signed to play with Atlant Moscow Oblast of the Kontinental Hockey League (KHL) for the 2010–11 season. Bourque had earlier signed a two-year contract with the team, worth US$1 Million per year, but the contract was not binding until July 15, 2010. After a disappointing start with Atlant Moscow Oblast, Bourque left the team on October 3, 2010.

On October 4, 2010, Swiss hockey club HC Lugano announced they had signed Bourque to a contract.

Bourque returned to re-sign with the Capitals on a one-year contract on July 2, 2011. In the 2011–12 season, Bourque was assigned by the Capitals to the Hershey Bears and led the league in scoring with a career-high 93 points in 73 games. On May 26, 2012, Bourque was traded by the Capitals to the Boston Bruins for forward Zach Hamill. Chris scored the only goal, his first as a Bruin, in a February 2, 2013 1–0 road game against the Toronto Maple Leafs.

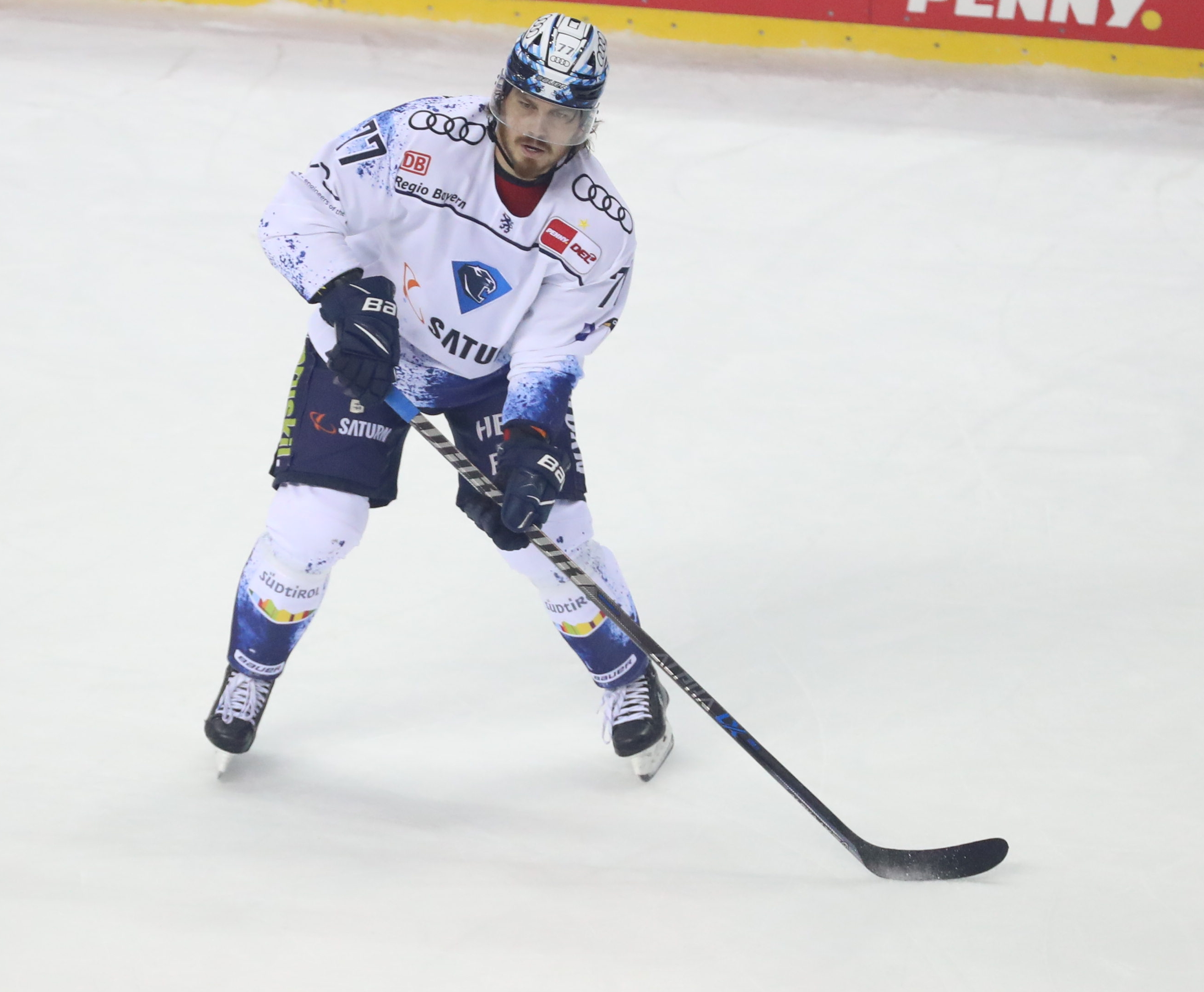
Chris Bourque (2021)

On June 18, 2013, having become a free agent, Bourque returned to the KHL, signing a one-year deal with Ak Bars Kazan. After only 11 games, Bourque mirrored his previous short-lived stint in the KHL, transferring to Swiss club EHC Biel for the remainder of the season.

On July 1, 2014, Bourque made another return to the NHL, in signing a one-year two way contract with the New York Rangers. Assigned to their AHL affiliate, the Hartford Wolf Pack for the 2014–15 season, Bourque led the team in scoring with 66 points in 73 games and was selected to the AHL first All-Star team.

On July 2, 2015, Bourque signed a two-year, two-way contract with the Washington Capitals. Assigned to the Hershey Bears for the 2015–16 season, Bourque led his team in scoring once again with 80 points in 72 games and was selected to his third AHL first All-Star team. On April 15, 2016, Bourque was announced as the winner of the AHL's winner of Most Valuable Player for the 2015–16 season. Bourque was a key part of Hershey's playoff run, who ultimately lost the Calder Cup Finals to the Lake Erie Monsters.

Bourque continued his long-tenured partnership with the Bears at the conclusion of his two-year deal with the Capitals, agreeing to an optional two-year deal with Hershey on June 20, 2017.

After completing his eighth season with the Bears in 2017–18, Bourque left as a free agent and as the AHL's active career leading scorer. Reuniting with his brother, Ryan, he signed a one-year deal with the Bridgeport Sound Tigers, affiliate of the New York Islanders, on July 9, 2018.

Following his lone season with the Sound Tigers in the 2018–19 season, Bourque as a free agent opted to return abroad for the first time in 5 years, agreeing to a one-year contract with German club, EHC München of the Deutsche Eishockey Liga (DEL), on May 27, 2019. He enjoyed three years in the DEL, finishing his tenure in Germany with ERC Ingolstadt in the 2021–22 season.

On April 30, 2022, Bourque announced his retirement from professional hockey after 17 seasons. It was later announced by the Hershey Bears that having played in nine seasons with the club, his #17 jersey would retired on January 14, 2023.

== International play ==
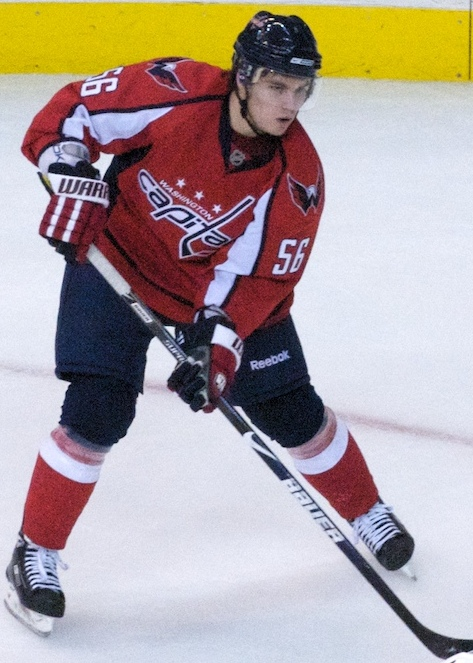
Bourque with the Capitals in 2008.

On January 1, 2018, it was announced that Bourque was selected to play for the United States at the 2018 Winter Olympics. He registered 2 assists in 5 games as the United States finished the tournament in seventh place.

== Personal life ==
Bourque is the son of Hockey Hall of Famer Ray Bourque and his wife Christianne. His younger brother, Ryan, also played in the Washington Capitals system and in the NHL for the New York Rangers. He also has an older sister, Melissa.

Bourque married his longtime girlfriend Kimberly McManus, in July 2011. The couple have a son and a daughter together. He is actively involved with his family's charity organization called The Bourque Foundation.

== Career statistics ==
=== Regular season and playoffs ===
			Regular season					Playoffs
Season	Team	League	GP	G	A	Pts	PIM	GP	G	A	Pts	PIM
2002–03	Cushing Academy	HS-Prep	28	31	26	57	49	—	—	—	—	—
2003–04	Cushing Academy	HS-Prep	31	37	53	90	96	—	—	—	—	—
2004–05	Boston University	HE	35	10	13	23	50	—	—	—	—	—
2004–05	Portland Pirates	AHL	6	1	1	2	2	—	—	—	—	—
2005–06	Hershey Bears	AHL	52	8	28	36	40	1	0	0	0	0
2006–07	Hershey Bears	AHL	76	25	33	58	49	19	2	6	8	18
2007–08	Hershey Bears	AHL	73	28	35	63	56	5	1	3	4	8
2007–08	Washington Capitals	NHL	4	0	0	0	2	—	—	—	—	—
2008–09	Hershey Bears	AHL	69	21	52	73	57	22	5	16	21	30
2008–09	Washington Capitals	NHL	8	1	0	1	0	—	—	—	—	—
2009–10	Pittsburgh Penguins	NHL	20	0	3	3	10	—	—	—	—	—
2009–10	Hershey Bears	AHL	49	22	48	70	26	21	7	20	27	10
2009–10	Washington Capitals	NHL	1	0	0	0	0	—	—	—	—	—
2010–11	Atlant Moscow Oblast	KHL	8	1	0	1	0	—	—	—	—	—
2010–11	HC Lugano	NLA	39	14	19	33	24	—	—	—	—	—
2011–12	Hershey Bears	AHL	73	27	66	93	42	5	1	3	4	0
2012–13	Providence Bruins	AHL	39	10	28	38	34	12	5	9	14	14
2012–13	Boston Bruins	NHL	18	1	3	4	6	—	—	—	—	—
2013–14	Ak Bars Kazan	KHL	11	2	0	2	6	—	—	—	—	—
2013–14	EHC Biel	NLA	21	6	7	13	14	—	—	—	—	—
2014–15	Hartford Wolf Pack	AHL	73	29	37	66	68	15	4	13	17	12
2015–16	Hershey Bears	AHL	72	30	50	80	56	21	4	8	12	20
2016–17	Hershey Bears	AHL	76	18	42	60	46	12	6	4	10	4
2017–18	Hershey Bears	AHL	64	17	36	53	63	—	—	—	—	—
2018–19	Bridgeport Sound Tigers	AHL	72	15	39	54	52	5	0	1	1	2
2019–20	EHC München	DEL	51	17	30	47	34	—	—	—	—	—
2020–21	EHC München	DEL	38	7	35	42	26	2	1	1	2	2
2021–22	ERC Ingolstadt	DEL	52	17	28	45	42	2	0	1	1	4
AHL totals			794	251	495	746	591	138	35	83	118	118
NHL totals			51	2	6	8	18	—	—	—	—	—

=== International ===
Year	Team	Event	Result	GP	G	A	Pts	PIM
2005	United States	WJC	4th	3	1	1	2	0
2006	United States	WJC	4th	7	7	1	8	12
2018	United States	OG	7th	5	0	2	2	2
Junior totals				10	8	2	10	12
Senior totals				5	0	2	2	2

== Awards and honors ==
Award	Year
College
All-Hockey East Rookie Team	2005
AHL
AHL All-Star Game	2009, 2012, 2015, 2016
First All-Star Team	2012, 2015, 2016
Jack A. Butterfield Trophy	2010
John B. Sollenberger Trophy	2012, 2016
Les Cunningham Award	2016
Calder Cup (Hershey Bears)	2006, 2009, 2010
AHL Hall of Fame	Class of 2026
