= Václav Meidl =

- Born: May 27, 1986 (age 39) Havířov, CZE
- Height: 6 ft 4 in (193 cm)
- Weight: 205 lb (93 kg; 14 st 9 lb)
- Position: Centre
- Shot: Right
- Czech 1.liga team Former teams: LHK Jestřábi Prostějov; AZ Havířov; Orli Znojmo; HC Olomouc; HC Kometa Brno; BK Havlíčkův Brod; HC Slovan Ústečtí Lvi
- NHL draft: 81st overall, 2004; Nashville Predators
- Playing career: 2006–2020

Václav Meidl (born May 27, 1986, in Havířov, Czechoslovakia) is an ice hockey forward. He is currently playing for LHK Jestřábi Prostějov of the 1st Czech Republic Hockey League. He has previously played in the Czech Extraliga for AZ Havířov, Orli Znojmo and HC Kometa Brno. He also played in the English Premier Ice Hockey League for the Manchester Phoenix, the German Oberliga for Saale Bulls Halle and the Polska Hokej Liga for Orlik Opole.

Meidl was drafted 81st overall by the Nashville Predators in the 2004 NHL entry draft.

== Career statistics ==
=== Regular season and playoffs ===
			Regular season					Playoffs
Season	Team	League	GP	G	A	Pts	PIM	GP	G	A	Pts	PIM
2000–01	HC Prostějov	CZE.2 U18	37	9	11	20	14	—	—	—	—	—
2001–02	HC Continental Zlín	CZE U18	7	1	0	1	2	—	—	—	—	—
2001–02	HC Oceláři Třinec	CZE U18	36	11	11	22	18	4	1	1	2	2
2002–03	HC Havířov Panthers	CZE U18	6	3	9	12	16	—	—	—	—	—
2002–03	HC Havířov Panthers	CZE U20	36	4	11	15	30	—	—	—	—	—
2002–03	HC Havířov Panthers	ELH	5	0	1	1	4	—	—	—	—	—
2003–04	Plymouth Whalers	OHL	67	14	28	42	108	9	0	3	3	4
2004–05	Plymouth Whalers	OHL	66	12	16	28	125	4	0	0	0	8
2005–06	Plymouth Whalers	OHL	30	6	11	17	59	—	—	—	—	—
2005–06	Saginaw Spirit	OHL	26	3	11	14	61	4	0	1	1	10
2006–07	Oshawa Generals	OHL	8	3	6	9	14	—	—	—	—	—
2006–07	HC Znojemští Orli	ELH	19	4	2	6	10	10	1	0	1	14
2006–07	HC Olomouc	CZE.2	1	0	0	0	0	—	—	—	—	—
2007–08	HC Znojemští Orli	ELH	41	1	0	1	24	3	0	0	0	0
2007–08	HC Olomouc	CZE.2	15	4	6	10	69	6	0	0	0	14
2008–09	HC Znojemští Orli	ELH	47	4	9	13	83	—	—	—	—	—
2008–09	HC Olomouc	CZE.2	2	0	0	0	2	—	—	—	—	—
2009–10	HC Kometa Brno	ELH	3	0	0	0	0	—	—	—	—	—
2009–10	Orli Znojmo	CZE.2	36	11	10	21	64	6	1	5	6	6
2010–11	HC Kometa Brno	ELH	6	0	1	1	2	—	—	—	—	—
2010–11	HC Rebel Havlíčkův Brod	CZE.2	39	15	18	33	46	14	3	8	11	12
2011–12	HC Rebel Havlíčkův Brod	CZE.2	43	5	17	22	34	5	1	1	2	18
2012–13	HC Rebel Havlíčkův Brod	CZE.2	22	3	4	7	42	—	—	—	—	—
2012–13	HC Slovan Ústečtí Lvi	CZE.2	20	3	4	7	18	—	—	—	—	—
2013–14	HC Slovan Ústečtí Lvi	CZE.2	25	4	2	6	10	—	—	—	—	—
2014–15	HC Slovan Ústí nad Labem	CZE.2	5	1	1	2	2	—	—	—	—	—
2014–15	LHK Jestřábi Prostějov	CZE.2	37	8	19	27	72	—	—	—	—	—
2015–16	LHK Jestřábi Prostějov	CZE.2	16	2	3	5	0	—	—	—	—	—
2015–16	HC AZ Havířov 2010	CZE.2	22	5	9	14	22	8	2	3	5	8
2016–17	HC AZ Havířov 2010	CZE.2	13	0	1	1	16	—	—	—	—	—
2016–17	Manchester Phoenix	GBR.2	18	6	8	14	26	—	—	—	—	—
2016–17	Saale Bulls Halle	GER.3	10	3	6	9	22	6	0	4	4	8
2017–18	Orlik Opole	POL	8	2	6	8	6	—	—	—	—	—
2017–18	LHK Jestřábi Prostějov	CZE.2	30	3	5	8	35	6	1	0	1	0
2018–19	LHK Jestřábi Prostějov	CZE.2	22	5	5	10	20	7	0	1	1	2
2019–20	LHK Jestřábi Prostějov	CZE.2	54	4	11	15	22	—	—	—	—	—
ELH totals			121	9	13	22	123	13	1	0	1	14
CZE.2 totals			402	73	115	188	474	52	8	18	26	60

=== International ===
Year	Team	Event	GP	G	A	Pts	PIM
2002	Czech Republic	U18	5	1
2003	Czech Republic	WJC18	6	0	0	0	2
2006	Czech Republic	WJC	6	1	1	2	4
Junior totals			12	1	1	2	6
