= Kyle Chipchura =

Canadian ice hockey player (born 1986)

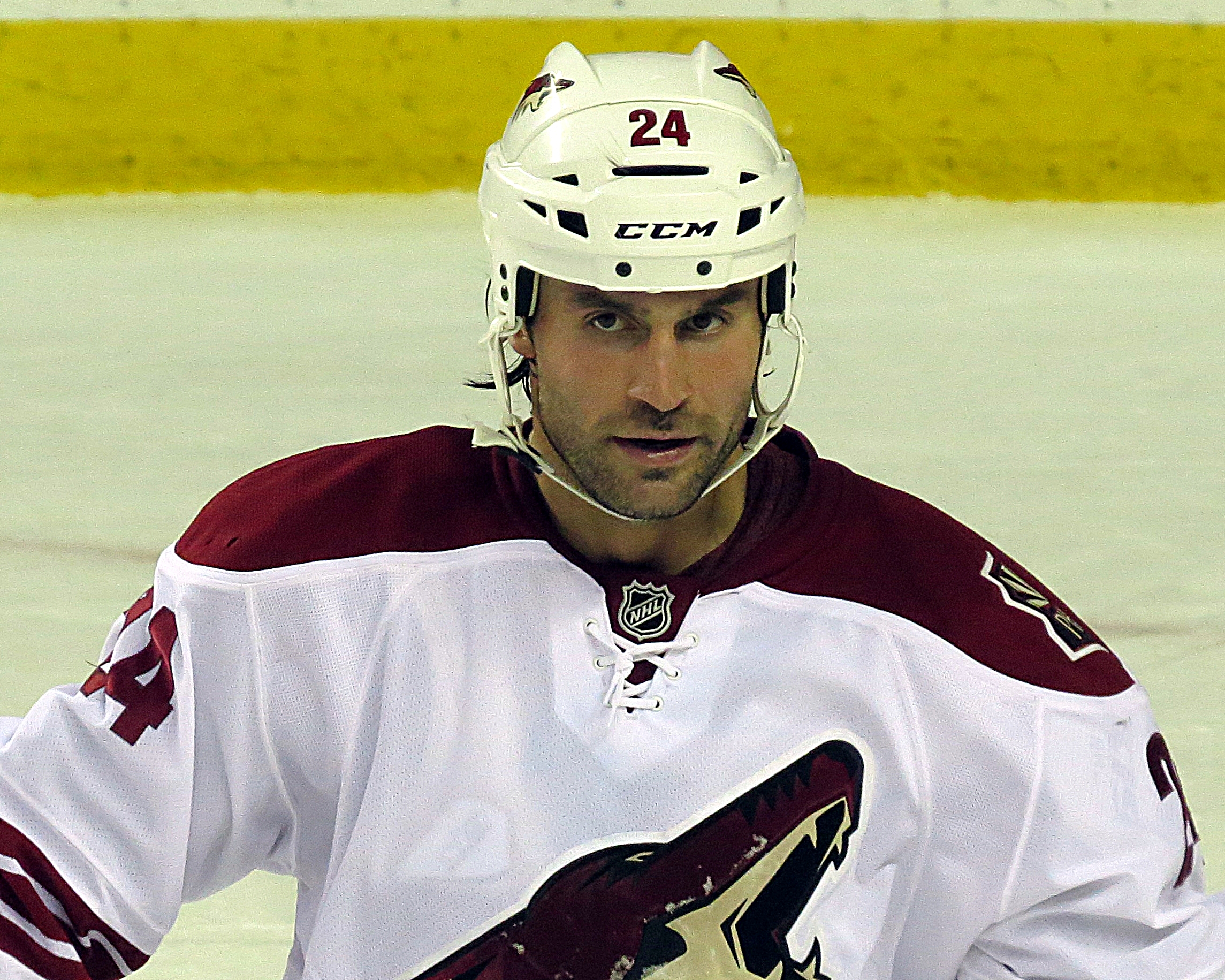
- Born: February 19, 1986 (age 40) Westlock, Alberta, Canada
- Height: 6 ft 2 in (188 cm)
- Weight: 206 lb (93 kg; 14 st 10 lb)
- Position: Centre
- Shot: Left
- Played for: Montreal Canadiens; Anaheim Ducks; Arizona Coyotes; Kunlun Red Star; HC Slovan Bratislava; Severstal Cherepovets
- NHL draft: 18th overall, 2004; Montreal Canadiens
- Playing career: 2006–2020

Kyle Douglas Glen Chipchura (born February 19, 1986) is a Canadian former professional ice hockey centre. He was selected in the first round, 18th overall, by the Montreal Canadiens in the 2004 NHL entry draft. Chipchura also played for the Anaheim Ducks and Arizona Coyotes.

== Early life ==
Chipchura was born in Westlock, Alberta. He played minor league hockey in nearby Legal and Westlock, and attended high school at R. F. Staples Secondary School and Carlton Comprehensive High School during his major junior career with the Prince Albert Raiders.

== Playing career ==
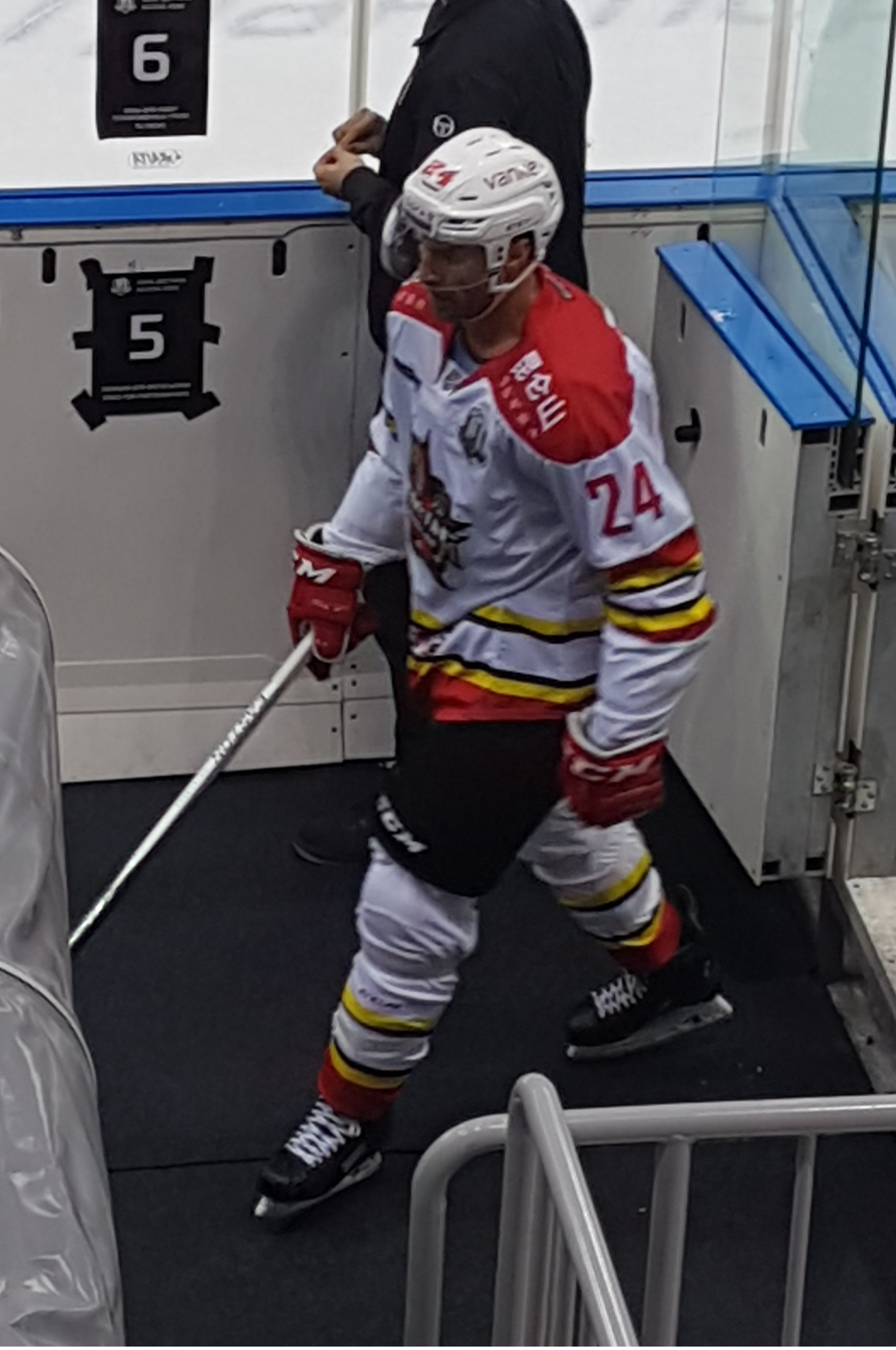
Chipchura with Kunlun Red Star in 2017

Chipchura began his major junior career with the Prince Albert Raiders of the Western Hockey League (WHL) in 2002–03. Following his second season with the Raiders, he was drafted by the Montreal Canadiens. On March 25, 2006, Chipchura was signed to a three-year entry-level contract by the Canadiens and joined AHL affiliate the Hamilton Bulldogs to complete the 2005–06 season. In 2006–07, Chipchura remained with the Bulldogs. After posting 39 points in the regular season, Chipchura added a further 6 goals and 13 points in the playoffs to help Hamilton capture the Calder Cup.

In the 2007–08 season, Chipchura played his first NHL game on October 10, 2007. He netted his first goal later that month on October 20 against the Buffalo Sabres.

On December 2, 2009, Chipchura was traded to the Anaheim Ducks for a fourth-round pick in 2011. Chipchura found a checking-line role within the Ducks and posted 6 goals and 6 assists to finish out the 2009–10 season. His second season with the Ducks proved less successful, in struggling for a regular roster spot, Chipchura finished with just 2 assists in 40 games.

Released by the Ducks and granted free agency, Chipchura signed to a one-year contract with the Phoenix Coyotes on July 19, 2011.

After five seasons within the Coyotes organization, Chipchura left the NHL as a free agent and signed his first contract abroad, agreeing to a one-year deal with Slovak outfit HC Slovan Bratislava of the KHL on July 17, 2016. Chipchura in his lone season with Bratislava in 2016–17, appeared in 59 games and posted 13 goals and 29 points.

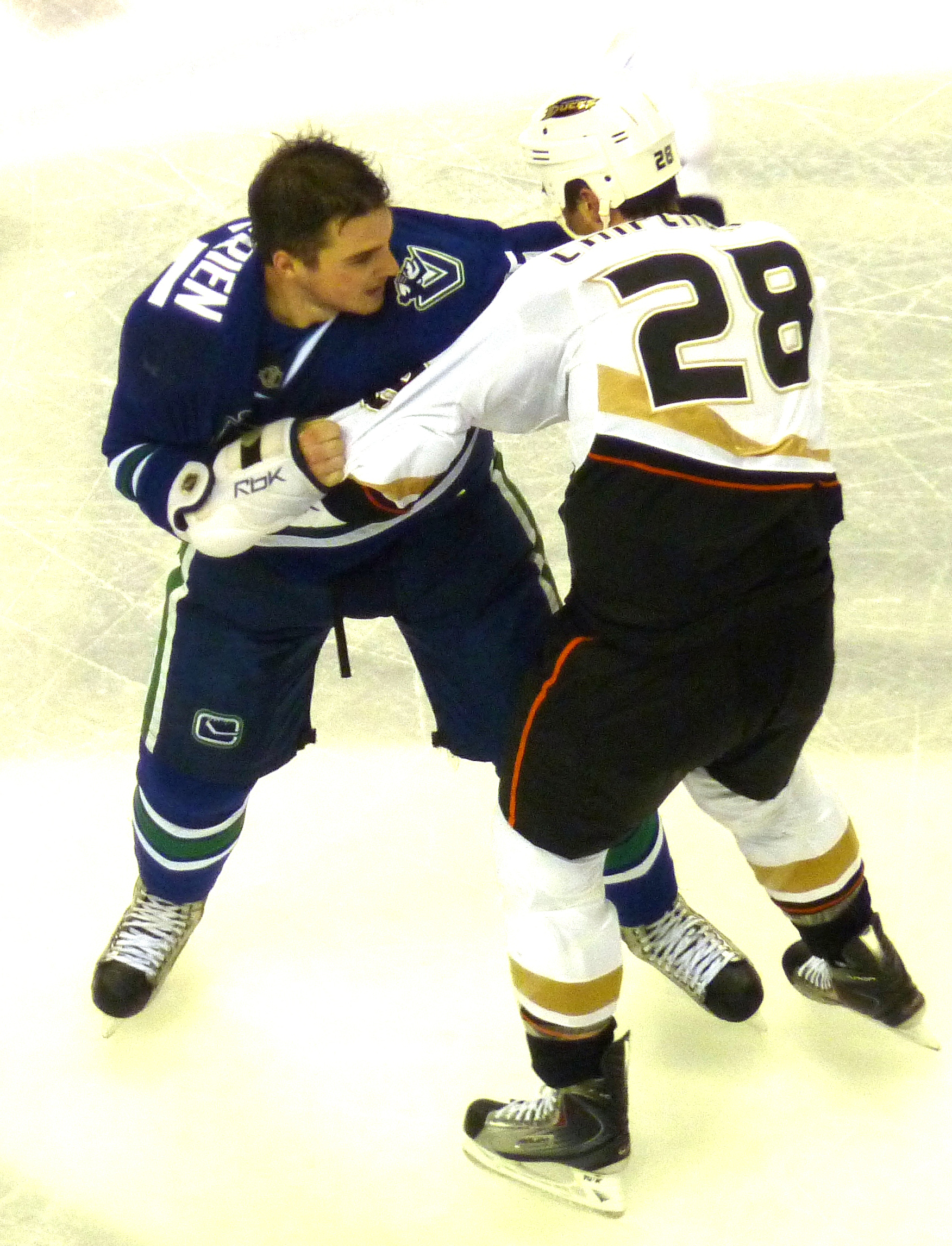
Chipchura with the Anaheim Ducks fighting Shane O'Brien in 2009

On June 2, 2017, Chipchura continued in the KHL, moving to Chinese outfit HC Kunlun Red Star on a one-year deal. At the conclusion of the 2017–18 season, having seen his production drop to just 11 points in 56 games, Chipchura opted to return to Slovan Bratislava as a free agent, agreeing to a one-year deal on July 17, 2018.

== International play ==
Chipchura attended Team Canada's selection camp prior to the 2005 World Junior Championships and was expected to make the team despite being only 18 (players up to 20 years old are eligible for the tournament). During practice with the Raiders, however, he suffered a severed Achilles tendon and was not able to be selected as a member of the gold-medal-winning Canadian team.

The following year, Chipchura was invited to try out again for the 2006 World Junior Championships. After being selected for the Canadian team, Chipchura was named team captain by head coach Brent Sutter on December 16, 2005. This made Chipchura the second Montreal Canadiens draft pick to ever wear the 'C' for Canada.

== Career statistics ==
=== Regular season and playoffs ===
			Regular season					Playoffs
Season	Team	League	GP	G	A	Pts	PIM	GP	G	A	Pts	PIM
2001–02	Fort Saskatchewan Rangers AAA	AMHL	33	15	36	51	79	17	16	20	36	—
2001–02	Prince Albert Raiders	WHL	2	0	0	0	0	—	—	—	—	—
2002–03	Prince Albert Raiders	WHL	63	9	21	30	89	—	—	—	—	—
2003–04	Prince Albert Raiders	WHL	64	15	33	48	118	6	2	4	6	12
2004–05	Prince Albert Raiders	WHL	28	14	18	32	32	14	4	7	11	25
2005–06	Prince Albert Raiders	WHL	59	21	34	55	81	—	—	—	—	—
2005–06	Hamilton Bulldogs	AHL	8	1	2	3	6	—	—	—	—	—
2006–07	Hamilton Bulldogs	AHL	80	12	27	39	56	22	6	7	13	20
2007–08	Montreal Canadiens	NHL	36	4	7	11	10	—	—	—	—	—
2007–08	Hamilton Bulldogs	AHL	39	10	11	21	27	—	—	—	—	—
2008–09	Montreal Canadiens	NHL	13	0	3	3	5	—	—	—	—	—
2008–09	Hamilton Bulldogs	AHL	51	14	21	35	65	6	3	0	3	2
2009–10	Montreal Canadiens	NHL	19	0	0	0	16	—	—	—	—	—
2009–10	Anaheim Ducks	NHL	55	6	6	12	56	—	—	—	—	—
2010–11	Anaheim Ducks	NHL	40	0	2	2	32	—	—	—	—	—
2011–12	Phoenix Coyotes	NHL	53	3	13	16	42	15	1	3	4	7
2011–12	Portland Pirates	AHL	8	4	2	6	4	—	—	—	—	—
2012–13	Arizona Sundogs	CHL	10	2	11	13	4	—	—	—	—	—
2012–13	Phoenix Coyotes	NHL	46	5	9	14	50	—	—	—	—	—
2013–14	Phoenix Coyotes	NHL	80	5	15	20	45	—	—	—	—	—
2014–15	Arizona Coyotes	NHL	70	4	10	14	82	—	—	—	—	—
2015–16	Arizona Coyotes	NHL	70	4	8	12	38	—	—	—	—	—
2016–17	Slovan Bratislava	KHL	59	13	16	29	50	—	—	—	—	—
2017–18	Kunlun Red Star	KHL	56	5	6	11	50	—	—	—	—	—
2018–19	Slovan Bratislava	KHL	61	6	14	20	27	—	—	—	—	—
2019–20	Severstal Cherepovets	KHL	7	0	1	1	0	—	—	—	—	—
KHL totals			183	24	37	61	127	—	—	—	—	—
NHL totals			482	31	73	104	376	15	1	3	4	7

=== International ===
Medal record

Representing Canada

Ice hockey

World Junior Championships
Gold medal – first place	2006 Vancouver	

Year	Team	Event	Result	GP	G	A	Pts	PIM
2003	Canada	U18	4th	5	1	0	1	2
2004	Canada	WJC18	4th	7	3	2	5	28
2006	Canada	WJC	1st place, gold medalist(s)	6	4	1	5	0
Junior totals				18	8	3	11	30

== Awards and honours ==
Award	Year
WHL
East Second All-Star Team	2006

Awards and achievements
Preceded by Andrei Kostitsyn	Montreal Canadiens first-round draft pick 2004	Succeeded by Carey Price
