= Sebastian Karlsson (ice hockey) =

Swedish ice hockey player

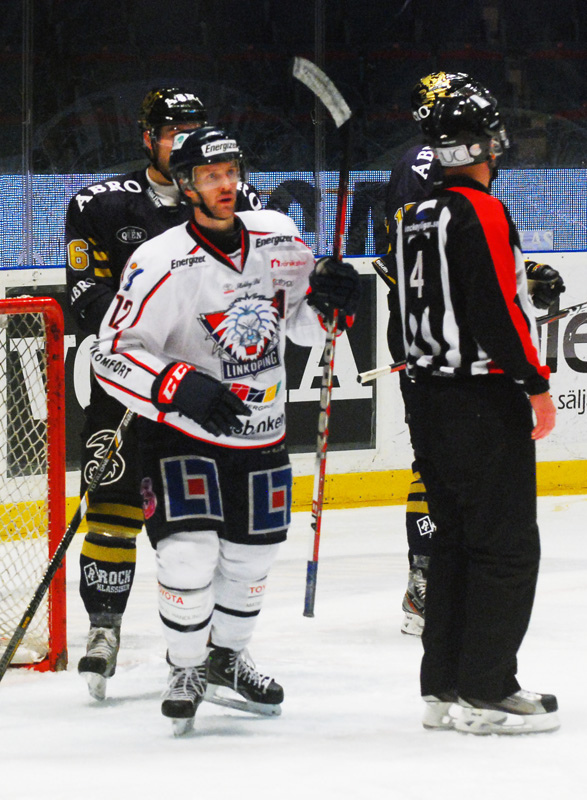
- Born: September 19, 1986 (age 38); Gothenburg, Sweden
- Height: 6 ft 0.5 in (184 cm)
- Weight: 194 lb (88 kg; 13 st 12 lb)
- Position: Forward
- Shoots: Left
- SHL team Former teams: Linköpings HC; Frölunda HC; Brynäs IF; Rögle BK
- Playing career: 2005–present

Sebastian Karlsson (born September 19, 1986 in Gothenburg, Sweden) is a professional Swedish ice hockey player. He is currently playing for Linköpings HC of the Swedish Swedish Hockey League (SHL).

== Playing career ==
On November 5, 2011, Sebastian Karlsson hit former Frölunda HC teammate Magnus Kahnberg to the head in an away game between Karlsson's Linköping and Kahnberg's Frölunda. The hit resulted in Kahnberg being hospitalised with a severe concussion, a deep forehead laceration, and several teeth knocked out. Karlsson received a match penalty, and was suspended for 11 Elitserien games, which was at the time the 2011–12 Elitserien season's longest suspension as well as the third longest suspension in the Elitserien history. He also missed the entire 2011 European Trophy playoffs as a result, because Elitserien suspensions also cover ice hockey in general and thus are not limited to the Elitserien league (the suspension expires after December 20, 2011).

== Personal ==
Karlsson is the younger brother of fellow professional ice hockey player, Jens Karlsson.
