= 2020 Tipsport Kaufland Cup =

Slovak ice hockey competition

Tournament details
- Host country: Slovakia
- Dates: September 2020 – February 2021
- Teams: 16

Final positions
- Champions: HK Nitra (1st title)
- Runners-up: HK Poprad

Official website
- tipsport_kaufland_cup

The 1st Tipsport Kaufland Cup was held from 7 September 2020 to 19 February 2021.

== Group stage ==
All times are local (UTC+1).

=== Group A ===
Pos	Team	Pld	W	OTW	D	OTL	L	GF	GA	GD	Pts	Qualification
1	HC '05 Banská Bystrica	3	2	0	1	0	0	14	8	+6	7	Quarterfinals
2	HC 07 Detva	3	1	1	1	0	0	10	8	+2	6	Quarterfinals
3	HK Martin	3	1	0	0	1	1	8	10	−2	4	
4	MHk 32 Liptovský Mikuláš	3	0	0	0	0	3	1	7	−6	0	

Source: Group A

8 September 2020; 16:30	MHk 32 Liptovský Mikuláš	0–4 (0–1, 0–2, 0–1)	HC '05 Banská Bystrica	Ice Stadium S.Mikitu Ružomberok; Attendance: 350

Game reference

Filip Krasanovský
Goalies
Matej Gajan

0–1	12:24 – Giertl (Demo)
0–2	25:37 – Mistele (Kriška, Winquist) (PP)
0–3	25:37 – Tamáši (Kabáč, Žiak)
0–4	48:01 – Ďatelinka (Lamper, Winquist) (PP2)

14 min
Penalties
2 min
24
Shots
39

8 September 2020; 18:00	HK Martin	3–4 OT (1–1, 1–0, 1–2) (OT: 0–1)	HC 07 Detva	Martin Ice Stadium; Attendance: 351

Game reference

Branislav Bernát
Goalies
Tomas Sholl

Dvořák (Paulíny, Barto) (PP) – 06:58	1–0
	1–1	14:51 – Cox (PP)
Poliaček (Murček, Smidžár) (PP) – 20:37	2–1
	2–2	41:14 – Cox (Gašpar, Valent)
Paulíny (Barto) – 53:50	3–2
	3–3	59:56 – Cox
	3–4	61:00 – Sýkora (Valent, Gašpar)

14 min
Penalties
22 min
40
Shots
45

10 September 2020; 18:00	HC 07 Detva	4–4 (1–2, 1–0, 2–2)	HC '05 Banská Bystrica	Detva Ice Stadium; Attendance: 330

Game reference

Roman Petrík
Goalies
Eugen Rabčan

	0–1	02:22 – Lunter (Sojka, Ďatelinka)
Gašpar (SH) – 09:45	1–1
	1–2	14:03 – Fafrák (Češík, Kabáč)
Čacho (Golian, Sýkora) (PP) – 30:02	2–2
Valent (Rymsha, Gašpar) (PP) – 43:43	3–2
Valent (Golian) – 58:58	4–2
	4–3	59:21 – Tamáši (Žiak)
	4–4	59:58 – Ďatelinka (Winquist, Tamáši)

14 min
Penalties
18 min
44
Shots
35

10 September 2020; 18:00	HK Martin	1–0 (1–0, 0–0, 0–0)	MHk 32 Liptovský Mikuláš	Martin Ice Stadium; Attendance: 332

Game reference
Pavol Maťovčík	Goalies	Kristian Tamminen
Barto (Paulíny, Tabaček) – 12:16 / 1–0
33 min	Penalties	60 min
33	Shots	31

14 September 2020; 18:00	HK Martin	4–6 (0–2, 2–1, 2–3)	HC '05 Banská Bystrica	Martin Ice Stadium; Attendance: 350

Game reference

Branislav Bernát
Goalies
Matej Gajan

	0–1	08:00 – Vybiral (Vašaš)
	0–2	11:51 – Sojka (Fafrák, Faško-Rudáš)
Poliaček (Paulíny, Burzík) (PP) – 26:56	1–2
Ligas (Pokrivčák, Dírer) (PP) – 27:35	2–2
	2–3	34:07 – Ďatelinka (Winquist) (PP)
Dvořák (Paulíny) (PP) – 41:08	3–3
	3–4	44:23 – Vybiral (Giertl)
	3–5	48:44 – Mistele (Winquist, Ďatelinka)
Dírer (Nauš, Barto) (PP) – 56:23	4–5
	4–6	48:44 – Mistele (Walsh, Sloboda)

6 min
Penalties
32 min
33
Shots
34

15 September 2020; 18:00	HC 07 Detva	2–1 (0–0, 0–0, 2–1)	MHk 32 Liptovský Mikuláš	Detva Ice Stadium; Attendance: 244

Game reference

Tomas Sholl
Goalies
Patrik Kozel

	0–1	43:36 – Hamráček (Okuliar, Petran)
Čacho (Cox) – 44:05	1–1
Sýkora (Gašpar, Valent) – 45:15	2–1

4 min
Penalties
10 min
39
Shots
26

=== Group B ===
Pos	Team	Pld	W	OTW	D	OTL	L	GF	GA	GD	Pts	Qualification
1	HC Slovan Bratislava	3	3	0	0	0	0	17	5	+12	9	Quarterfinals
2	HK Nitra	3	2	0	0	0	1	14	9	+5	6	Quarterfinals
3	HC Nové Zámky	3	1	0	0	0	2	11	8	+3	3	
4	HK Skalica	3	0	0	0	0	3	2	22	−20	0	

Source: Group B

7 September 2020; 18:00	HK Skalica	0–8 (0–4, 0–2, 0–2)	HC Slovan Bratislava	Skalica Ice Stadium; Attendance: 380

Game reference

Juraj Ovečka
Goalies
Ádam Beke

0–1	04:21 – Kytnár (Ališauskas, Studenič)
0–2	08:29 – Studenič (Ališauskas)
0–3	13:40 – Maier (Bortňák)
0–4	19:00 – Sersen (PP)
0–5	24:42 – Buček
0–6	30:14 – Meszároš (O'Donnell) (PP)
0–7	43:00 – Mráz (Petráš, Sersen)
0–8	48:23 – Buček (Ranford)

10 min
Penalties
8 min

8 September 2020; 18:30	HC Nové Zámky	2–4 (1–0, 1–2, 0–2)	HK Nitra	Nové Zámky Ice Stadium; Attendance: 399

Game reference

Christián Pavlas
Goalies
Evan Cowley

Seppänen (Hämäläinen, Obdržálek) – 10:55	1–0
	1–1	20:44 – Slovák (Hrnka, Žitný) (PP)
Seppänen (Hämäläinen, Obdržálek) – 22:09	2–1
	2–2	24:36 – Šťastný (Lantoši) (PP)
	2–3	41:40 – Šťastný (Dauda)
	2–4	50:38 – Žitný (Lantoši)

8 min
Penalties
10 min
43
Shots
36

10 September 2020; 17:00	HK Skalica	2–9 (1–3, 0–3, 1–3)	HC Nové Zámky	Skalica Ice Stadium

Game reference

Juraj Ovečka
Goalies
Henri Kiviaho
Jakub Lackovič

	0–1	03:02 – Jurík (Obdržálek, Drtina) (PP)
Muráň (Štumpf) – 10:25	1–1
	1–2	11:01 – Bajtek (Andrisík)
	1–3	14:32 – Seppänen (Västilä, Drtina) (PP)
	1–4	29:42 – Västilä (Bajtek, Andrisík)
	1–5	35:14 – Jurík (Ondrušek)
	1–6	37:44 – Obdržálek (Holovič, Jurík)
	1–7	42:18 – Drtina (Obdržálek, Holovič)
	1–8	51:47 – Holovič (Obdržálek, Jurík) (PP)
	1–9	52:13 – Bajtek (Fereta, Šeliga)
Klučiar (Hujsa, Štumpf) (PP2) – 56:22	2–9

8 min
Penalties
14 min
25
Shots
41

10 September 2020; 18:00	HK Nitra	5–7 (3–3, 1–1, 1–3)	HC Slovan Bratislava	Nitra Aréna; Attendance: 380

Game reference

Evan Cowley
Goalies
Roman Durný

	0–1	04:26 – Bortňák (Rapáč)
Tvrdoň (Cardwell) (PP) – 05:36	1–1
	1–2	10:22 – Buček (SH)
Pätoprstý (Švarný) – 13:09	2–2
	2–3	13:32 – Rapáč (Bortňák, Buček)
Dauda (Lantoši) (PP) – 16:52	3–3
	3–4	24:01 – Petráš
Slovák (Mezei, Dauda) – 24:43	4–4
	4–5	45:49 – Studenič (Meszároš) (PP)
Cardwell (Tvrdoň) (PP) – 55:35	5–5
	5–6	56:54 – Sukeľ
	5–7	59:46 – Kytnár (EN, SH)

12 min
Penalties
14 min
28
Shots
31

15 September 2020; 17:00	HK Skalica	0–5 disq.	HK Nitra	Skalica Ice Stadium

17 September 2020; 17:30	HC Nové Zámky	0–2 (0–0, 0–1, 0–1)	HC Slovan Bratislava	Nové Zámky Ice Stadium; Attendance: 324

Game reference
Henri Kiviaho	Goalies	Roman Durný
0–1 / 31:18 – Buček (Mráz, Petráš); 0–2 / 58:43 – Buček (Mráz) (EN)
12 min	Penalties	6 min
23	Shots	25

=== Group C ===
Pos	Team	Pld	W	OTW	D	OTL	L	GF	GA	GD	Pts	Qualification
1	HK Poprad	3	2	1	0	0	0	12	4	+8	8	Quarterfinals
2	HK Dukla Michalovce	3	1	1	0	0	1	7	7	0	5	Quarterfinals
3	HC Košice	3	1	0	0	1	1	10	10	0	4	
4	HK Spišská Nová Ves	3	0	0	0	1	2	5	13	−8	1	

Source: Group C

8 September 2020; 18:00	HK Poprad	4–3 OT (2–1, 1–1, 0–1) (OT: 1–0)	HC Košice	Poprad Ice Stadium; Attendance: 380

Game reference

Tomáš Vošvrda
Goalies
Jakub Sedláček

Svitana (Preisinger, Haščák) (PP) – 07:54	1–0
	1–1	12:24 – Havrila (Jokeľ, Milý)
Preisinger (Handlovský) (SH) – 15:35	2–1
Paločko (Bjalončík) – 22:31	3–1
	3–2	29:28 – Frič (Džugan, Réway)
	3–3	52:21 – Milý (Réway, Chovan) (PP)
Bjalončík – 61:56	4–3

10 min
Penalties
56 min
31
Shots
18

8 September 2020; 18:00	HK Spišská Nová Ves	2–3 OT (0–0, 1–0, 1–2) (OT: 0–1)	HK Dukla Michalovce	Spiš Aréna

Game reference

Filip Surák
Goalies
Tomáš Tomek
Vladimír Glosár

Tyczyński (Rapáč, Hvila) (PP) – 31:31	1–0
Rapáč (Fabian, Chovan) – 54:36	2–0
	2–1	55:43 – Korhonen (Šoltés, Hickmott)
	2–2	57:53 – Šoltés (Hickmott, Southorn)
	2–3	62:11 – Bartánus

6 min
Penalties
6 min
21
Shots
36

10 September 2020; 17:30	HK Dukla Michalovce	0–2 (0–1, 0–1, 0–0)	HK Poprad	Michalovce Ice Stadium; Attendance: 250

Game reference
Stanislav Škorvánek	Goalies	Tomáš Vošvrda
0–1 / 18:23 – Preisinger (Svitana, Drgoň) (PP); 0–2 / 39:22 – Bjalončík (Brejčák, Paločko)
12 min	Penalties	16 min
25	Shots	32

10 September 2020; 18:00	HK Spišská Nová Ves	2–4 (1–1, 1–0, 0–3)	HC Košice	Spiš Aréna; Attendance: 320

Game reference

Filip Surák
Goalies
Dominik Riečický

Matej (Rapáč, Hvila) (PP) – 08:40	1–0
	1–1	14:21 – Klhůfek (Frič, Novota)
Piačka (Novák, Vartovník) (PP) – 22:28	2–1
	2–2	42:52 – Chovan (Pavlin)
	2–3	49:40 – Milý (Klhůfek, Deyl)
	2–4	58:31 – Jokeľ (Chovan, Milý)

12 min
Penalties
16 min
25
Shots
46

15 September 2020; 17:30	HK Dukla Michalovce	4–3 (3–2, 1–1, 0–0)	HC Košice	Michalovce Ice Stadium; Attendance: 250

Game reference

Tomáš Tomek
Goalies
Jakub Sedláček

Mlynarovič (Ventelä, Ťavoda) – 02:00	1–0
Regenda (Mihálik, Mlynarovič) – 04:08	2–0
Takáč (Regenda, Mlynarovič) – 08:05	3–0
	3–1	09:05 – Deyl (Réway, Chovan)
	3–2	17:15 – Chovan (Réway)
Mlynarovič (Ťavoda, Takáč) – 25:01	4–2
	4–3	34:35 – Réway (Chovan) (PP)

18 min
Penalties
12 min
27
Shots
33

15 September 2020; 18:00	HK Spišská Nová Ves	1–6 (0–3, 0–2, 1–1)	HK Poprad	Spiš Aréna

Game reference

Filip Surák
Matej Šimo
Goalies
Roman Rychlík

	0–1	12:25 – Bjalončík (Matej Paločko, Matúš Paločko)
	0–2	14:26 – Lušňák (Handlovský) (PP)
	0–3	19:57 – Matúš Paločko (Brejčák, Kramár) (PP)
	0–4	20:36 – Šotek (Mešár)
	0–5	39:01 – Handlovský (Lušňák, Dalhuisen) (PP)
	0–6	50:03 – Handlovský (Dalhuisen, Drgoň) (PP)
Saluga (Tábi, Tomala) – 51:25	1–6

24 min
Penalties
10 min
29
Shots
33

=== Group D ===
Pos	Team	Pld	W	OTW	D	OTL	L	GF	GA	GD	Pts	Qualification
1	HK Dukla Trenčín	3	2	0	0	1	0	19	7	+12	7	Quarterfinals
2	HC Topoľčany	3	2	0	0	0	1	11	17	−6	6	Quarterfinals
3	HKM Zvolen	3	1	1	0	0	1	12	8	+4	5	
4	HK Dubnica	3	0	0	0	0	3	8	18	−10	0	

Source: Group D

8 September 2020; 18:00	HC Topoľčany	4–3 (2–2, 2–1, 0–0)	HKM Zvolen	Topvar Aréna; Attendance: 379

Game reference

Juraj Halo
Goalies
Adam Trenčan

	0–1	06:38 – Nuutinen (Betker) (PP)
	0–2	11:20 – Stupka (Viedenský, Kelemen)
Kluka (Tomčák, Nemček) – 11:58	1–2
Gergel (Hvizdoš, Bystričan) – 12:39	2–2
Kalináč – 21:36	3–2
Danišovský (Kalináč, Novák) – 29:56 (PP)	4–2
	4–3	37:12 – Meliško (McPherson)

6 min
Penalties
20 min
35
Shots
39

10 September 2020; 18:00	HK Dukla Trenčín	3–4 OT (0–2, 1–0, 2–1) (OT: 0–1)	HKM Zvolen	Pavol Demitra Ice Stadium; Attendance: 72

Game reference

Matej Kristín
Goalies
Robin Rahm

	0–1	14:16 – Nuutinen (Viedenský)
	0–2	16:46 – Nuutinen (McPherson, Melancon) (PP)
Bezúch (Jaborník, Mesikämmen) – 21:04	1–2
Kettunen (Kukuča, Daňo) (PP) – 40:36	2–2
Starosta – 42:43	3–2
	3–3	52:13 – Zuzin (Puliš, Bondra)
	3–4	64:27 – Viedenský (McPherson, Melancon) (PP)

34 min
Penalties
24 min

10 September 2020; 18:00	HK Dubnica	5–6 (0–1, 2–3, 3–2)	HC Topoľčany	Dubnica Ice Stadium; Attendance: 324

Game reference

Peter Kutej
Goalies
Juraj Halo

	0–1	03:37 – Minárik (Novák, Jurák)
	0–2	23:40 – Kluka (Laššo, Danišovský)
	0–3	24:47 – Novák (Jurák, Minárik) (PP)
	0–4	27:13 – Nemček (Škápik, Kluka) (PP)
Luhový (Klíma, Ondruš) – 31:51	1–4
Kanaet (Janík, Dvonč) (PP) – 35:01	2–4
Beták (Kristín, Ďuriš) – 41:31	3–4
	3–5	41:52 – Danišovský (Laššo, Bulák)
	3–6	52:20 – Kalináč (Jurák, Novák) (PP)
Ondruš (Luhový) – 55:02	4–6
Luhový (Lukáčik, Klíma) (PP) – 58:33	5–6

14 min
Penalties
14 min

15 September 2020; 18:00	HC Topoľčany	1–9 (0–1, 0–3, 1–5)	HK Dukla Trenčín	Topvar Aréna; Attendance: 400

Game reference

Juraj Halo
Goalies
Michal Valent

	0–1	02:26 – Paukovček (Bokroš)
	0–2	20:53 – Paukovček (Hecl) (SH) – 20:53
	0–3	26:29 – Mesikämmen (Stacha, Sojčík)
	0–4	27:42 – Kukuča (Hecl, Paukovček)
	0–5	41:37 – Skladaný (Sojčík, Bezúch) (PP)
	0–6	42:57 – Ferényi (Ďurina)
	0–7	47:40 – Hecl (Paukovček, Kukuča) (PP)
Tomčák (Kalináč, Kluka) (PP2) – 51:23	1–7
	1–8	55:11 – Krajč (Sládok) (PP)
	1–9	59:39 – Kukuča (Starosta, Paukovček)

14 min
Penalties
53 min
20
Shots
37

15 September 2020; 18:00	HK Dubnica	1–5 (0–2, 1–3, 0–0)	HKM Zvolen	Dubnica Ice Stadium; Attendance: 346

Game reference

Peter Kutej
Goalies
Adam Trenčan

	0–1	10:33 – Viedenský (Melancon, McPherson)
	0–2	19:10 – Puliš (Viedenský, Betker)
	0–3	20:36 – Chlepčok (Ivan, Melancon)
Hús (Dúžek) – 22:28	1–3
	1–4	26:11 – Bondra
	1–5	33:59 – Kubka (McPherson, Hraško)

10 min
Penalties
8 min
16
Shots
51

17 September 2020; 18:00	HK Dubnica	2–7 (0–0, 1–2, 1–5)	HK Dukla Trenčín	Dubnica Ice Stadium; Attendance: 500

Game reference

Michal Gabriš
Goalies
Matej Kristín

Dmitriev (Popela, Lukáčik) (PP2) – 21:40	1–0
	1–1	22:10 – Daňo (Krajč, Jaborník)
	1–2	23:55 – Bezúch (Jaborník, Kettunen)
	1–3	44:24 – Skladaný (Hlinka)
	1–4	50:45 – Bokroš (Skladaný, Švec)
	1–5	50:58 – Ferényi (Mesikämmen, Krajč)
Popela (Dúžek, Kanaet) (PP) – 54:02	2–5
	2–6	55:02 – Kukuča (Sojčík)
	2–7	58:19 – Bezúch (Daňo)

91 min
Penalties
135 min
26
Shots
44

== Quarterfinals ==
=== First leg ===
22 September 2020; 17:30	HK Dukla Michalovce	1–2 (0–0, 0–2, 1–0)	HC '05 Banská Bystrica	Michalovce Ice Stadium; Attendance: 250

Game reference

Stanislav Škorvánek
Goalies
Eugen Rabčan

	0–1	22:02 – Vybíral (Vašaš)
	0–2	39:48 – Winquist (Lamper, Mistele)
Mihálik (Lalancette, Southorn) – 47:14	1–2

8 min
Penalties
18 min
37
Shots
26

22 September 2020; 18:00	HK Poprad	4–0 (0–0, 3–0, 1–0)	HC 07 Detva	Poprad Ice Stadium; Attendance: 473

Game reference

Tomáš Vošvrda
Goalies
Tomas Sholl

Handlovský (Paločko, Zagrapan) (SH) – 27:30	1–0
Handlovský (Preisinger, Mešár) – 30:24	2–0
Drgoň (Haščák, Skokan) (PP2) – 37:45	3–0
Haščák (Skokan, Svitana) – 54:59	4–0

30 min
Penalties
24 min
44
Shots
29

22 September 2020; 18:00	HK Nitra	6–3 (1–1, 1–1, 4–1)	HK Dukla Trenčín	Nitra Aréna; Attendance: 500

Game reference

Evan Cowley
Goalies
Matej Kristín

Holešinský (Bodák, Minárik) – 02:35	1–0
	1–1	14:45 – Daňo (Kettunen) (SH)
Šťastný (Kollár, Lantoši) – 24:05	2–1
	2–2	24:20 – Kettunen (Daňo)
Kollár (Dauda, Lantoši) (PP) – 43:22	3–2
Slovák (Tvrdoň, Švarný) – 45:34	4–2
Cardwell (Lantoši, Šťastný) – 46:04	5–2
	5–3	55:48 – Sojčík (PP)
Hrnka (Slovák, Tvrdoň) – 57:45	6–3

14 min
Penalties
12 min
36
Shots
43

22 September 2020; 18:00	HC Topoľčany	2–5 (2–0, 0–3, 0–2)	HC Slovan Bratislava	Topvar Aréna; Attendance: 482

Game reference

Juraj Halo
Goalies
Richard Noskovič

Kluka (Novák, Kalináč) (PP) – 06:19	1–0
Tomčák (Jurák, Kalináč) (PP) – 16:55	2–0
	2–1	25:22 – Sukeľ (Studenič, Meszároš)
	2–2	29:09 – O'Donnell (Buček, Mráz)
	2–3	32:16 – Sersen (Buček, Ranford) (PP)
	2–4	50:35 – Buček (Bortňák, Studenič) (PP)
	2–5	55:01 – Ranford

14 min
Penalties
16 min
23
Shots
40

=== Second leg ===
24 September 2020; 17:30	HC '05 Banská Bystrica	4–6 OT (1–1, 2–1, 1–3) (OT: 0–1)	HK Dukla Michalovce	Zvolen Ice Stadium; Attendance: 372

Game reference

Matej Gajan
Goalies
Tomáš Tomek

	0–1	08:56 – Korhonen (Galamboš, Ventelä)
Verbeek – 09:38	1–1
	1–2	26:20 – Šoltés (Takáč) (PP)
Lunter (Žiak, Brejčák) – 32:31	2–2
Mistele (PS) – 38:15	3–2
Fafrák (Vašaš, Tamáši) (PP) – 41:06	4–2
	4–3	43:02 – Šoltés
	4–4	44:25 – Mihálik (Hickmott, Regenda)
	4–5	47:54 – Bartánus (Southorn)
	4–6	64:24 – Galamboš (Takáč)

24 min
Penalties
12 min

24 September 2020; 18:00	HC 07 Detva	3–3 (0–1, 3–1, 0–1)	HK Poprad	Detva Ice Stadium; Attendance: 226

Game reference

Roman Petrík
Goalies
Tomáš Vošvrda

	0–1	19:32 – Drgoň (Haščák, Skokan) (PP)
Rymsha (Gašpar, Valent) (PP) – 23:23	1–1
Askarov (Lalík, Nauš) – 24:59	2–1
	2–2	28:13 – Haščák (Svitana, Brejčák) (PP)
Askarov (Sýkora) (PP) – 37:21	3–2
	3–3	45:46 – Paločko (Bjalončík, Ulrych)

4 min
Penalties
10 min
33
Shots
25

24 September 2020; 18:00	HK Dukla Trenčín	2–0 (1–0, 1–0, 0–0)	HK Nitra	Pavol Demitra Ice Stadium; Attendance: 500

Game reference
Michal Valent	Goalies	Evan Cowley
Paukovček (Sádecký, Hecl) – 00:49 / 1–0; Švec (Sojčík) (SH) – 30:21 / 2–0
20 min	Penalties	12 min

24 September 2020; 18:30	HC Slovan Bratislava	5–0 (1–0, 4–0, 0–0)	HC Topoľčany	Ondrej Nepela Arena; Attendance: 250

Game reference

Roman Durný
Richard Noskovič
Goalies
Juraj Halo

Harris (Kytnár) (PP) – 02:32	1–0
Petráš (Sukeľ, Maier) – 21:39	2–0
O'Donnell (Sersen) – 24:05	3–0
Studenič (Sersen, Mráz) (PP) – 32:10	4–0
Bačík (Ranford, O'Donnell) (PP) – 38:46	5–0

18 min
Penalties
32 min
55
Shots
23

== Semifinals ==
=== First leg ===
3 November 2020; 17:30	HK Dukla Michalovce	0–1 (0–0, 0–1, 0–0)	HK Poprad	Michalovce Ice Stadium

Game reference
Tomáš Tomek	Goalies	Tomáš Vošvrda
0–1 / 21:12 – Svitana (Skokan, Haščák) (PP)
10 min	Penalties	10 min
38	Shots	32

4 November 2020; 17:30	HK Nitra	4–5 (2–4, 2–0, 0–1)	HC Slovan Bratislava	Nitra Aréna

Game reference

=== Second leg ===
16 December 2020; 15:30	HK Poprad	3–2 (1–0, 1–1, 1–1)	HK Dukla Michalovce	Poprad Ice Stadium

Game reference

15 December 2020; 17:30	HC Slovan Bratislava	1–3 (1–1, 0–0, 0–2)	HK Nitra	Ondrej Nepela Arena

Game reference

== Final ==
19 February 2021; 17:00	HK Nitra	5–3 (1–1, 2–1, 2–1)	HK Poprad	Detva Ice Stadium, Detva

Game reference
Evan Cowley	Goalies	Peter Hamerlík
26 min	Penalties	20 min
43	Shots	42
