= Matúš Paločko =

Slovak ice hockey player

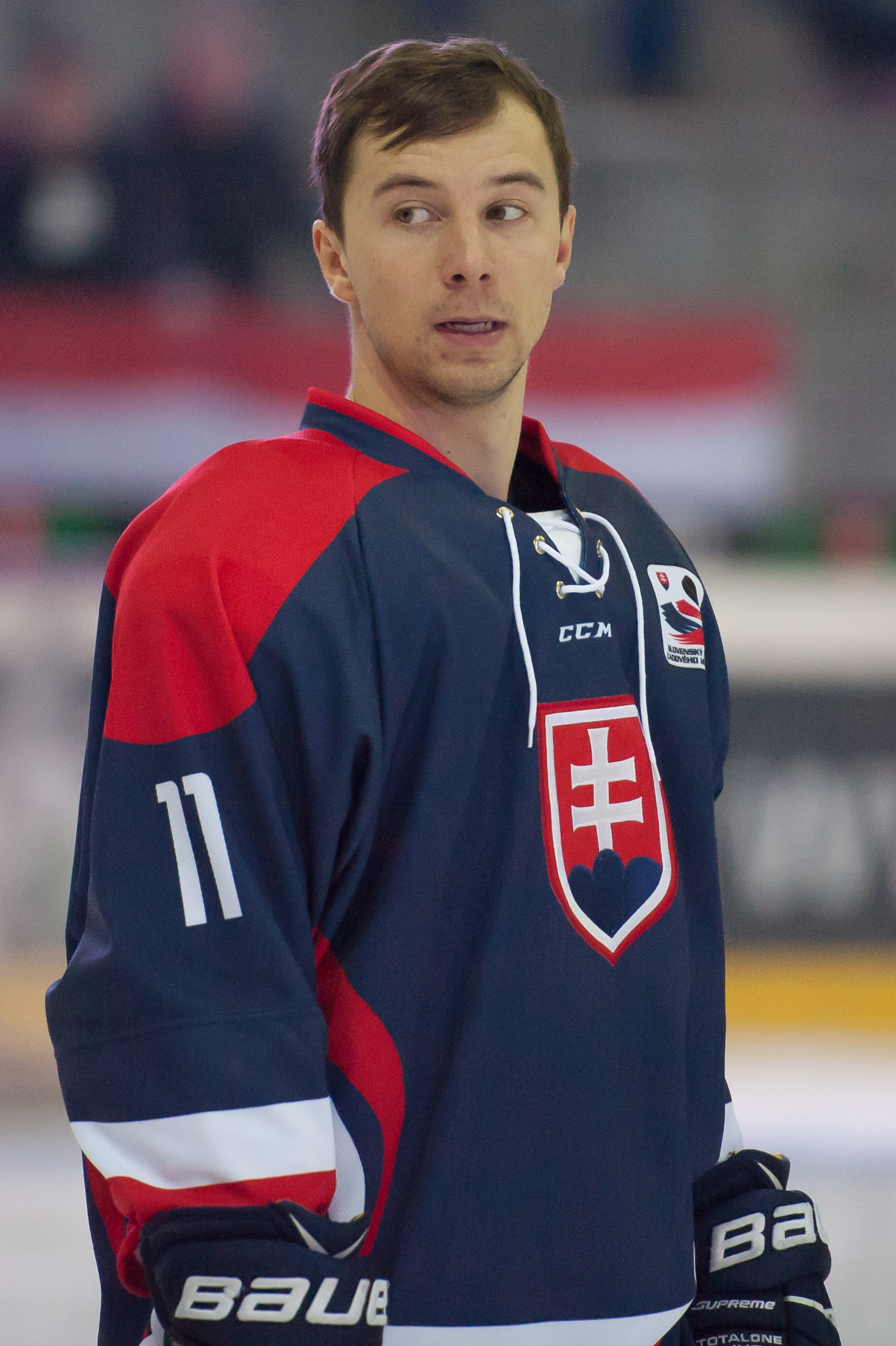
- Born: 23 December 1990 (age 35) Poprad, Czechoslovakia
- Height: 178 cm (5 ft 10 in)
- Weight: 72 kg (159 lb; 11 st 5 lb)
- Position: Forward
- Shoots: Left
- Slovak team Former teams: HK Dukla Michalovce; HK Poprad; HC Prešov; HC Stadion Litoměřice; HK Spišská Nová Ves; MHk 32 Liptovský Mikuláš
- NHL draft: Undrafted
- Playing career: 2008–present

Matúš Paločko (born 23 December 1990) is a Slovak professional ice hockey player currently playing for HK Dukla Michalovce of the Slovak Extraliga.

== Career statistics ==
=== Regular season and playoffs ===
| | | | Regular season | | | | | Playoffs |
| Season | Team | League | GP | G | A | Pts | PIM | GP | G | A | Pts | PIM |
|---|---|---|---|---|---|---|---|---|---|---|---|---|
| 2007–08 | HK Poprad | Slovak-Jr. | 8 | 2 | 0 | 2 | 2 | — | — | — | — | — |
| 2008–09 | HK Poprad | Slovak-Jr. | 52 | 17 | 33 | 50 | 57 | — | — | — | — | — |
| 2008–09 | HK Poprad | Slovak | 6 | 0 | 0 | 0 | 0 | — | — | — | — | — |
| 2009–10 | HK Poprad | Slovak-Jr. | 41 | 25 | 31 | 56 | 78 | 5 | 3 | 6 | 9 | 4 |
| 2010–11 | HK Poprad | Slovak-Jr. | 11 | 8 | 12 | 20 | 12 | — | — | — | — | — |
| 2010–11 | HK Poprad | Slovak | 49 | 2 | 7 | 9 | 37 | 10 | 0 | 0 | 0 | 29 |
| 2011–12 | HK Poprad | Slovak | 26 | 0 | 0 | 0 | 2 | — | — | — | — | — |
| 2011–12 | HC Prešov | Slovak.1 | 4 | 0 | 0 | 0 | 2 | 3 | 0 | 0 | 0 | 2 |
| 2012–13 | HK Poprad | Slovak | 51 | 3 | 9 | 12 | 12 | 7 | 2 | 1 | 3 | 35 |
| 2013–14 | HK Poprad | Slovak | 55 | 12 | 18 | 30 | 28 | — | — | — | — | — |
| 2014–15 | HK Poprad | Slovak | 56 | 25 | 12 | 37 | 51 | 6 | 1 | 0 | 1 | 6 |
| 2015–16 | HK Poprad | Slovak | 35 | 8 | 13 | 21 | 28 | 5 | 0 | 1 | 1 | 4 |
| 2016–17 | HC Stadion Litoměřice | Czech.1 | 23 | 4 | 6 | 10 | 10 | — | — | — | — | — |
| 2016–17 | HK Poprad | Slovak | 28 | 6 | 9 | 15 | 16 | 4 | 0 | 0 | 0 | 4 |
| 2017–18 | HK Poprad | Slovak | 46 | 11 | 4 | 15 | 20 | 4 | 0 | 1 | 1 | 0 |
| 2017–18 | HK Spišská Nová Ves | Slovak.1 | 6 | 5 | 3 | 8 | 2 | — | — | — | — | — |
| 2018–19 | HK Poprad | Slovak | 19 | 1 | 6 | 7 | 2 | 12 | 2 | 2 | 4 | 4 |
| 2019–20 | HK Poprad | Slovak | 33 | 9 | 10 | 19 | 20 | — | — | — | — | — |
| 2020–21 | HK Poprad | Slovak | 47 | 5 | 10 | 15 | 14 | 4 | 0 | 0 | 0 | 4 |
| 2021–22 | MHk 32 Liptovský Mikuláš | Slovak | 50 | 6 | 13 | 19 | 22 | — | — | — | — | — |
| 2022–23 | HK Dukla Michalovce | Slovak | 49 | 13 | 12 | 25 | 28 | 8 | 3 | 1 | 4 | 4 |
| Slovak totals | | | 550 | 101 | 123 | 224 | 280 | 60 | 8 | 6 | 14 | 90 |
