= Mesikämmen =

Mesikämmen may refer to:

- Ilkka Mesikämmen (1943–2025), Finnish ice hockey player
- Konsta Mesikämmen (born 1993), Finnish ice hockey player

== See also ==
- Finnish mythology ("mesikämmen" as an old name for the bear)
