= Jozef Švec =

Slovak ice hockey player

- Born: 8 October 1995 (age 30) Trenčín, Slovakia
- Height: 6 ft 1 in (185 cm)
- Weight: 176 lb (80 kg; 12 st 8 lb)
- Position: Left wing
- Shoots: Left
- Polska team Former teams: JKH GKS Jastrzębie; HK Dukla Trenčín; HK 95 Považská Bystrica; HK Dubnica
- NHL draft: Undrafted
- Playing career: 2012–present

Jozef Švec (born 8 October 1995) is a Slovak professional ice hockey player who is currently playing for JKH GKS Jastrzębie of the Polska Hokej Liga.

== Career statistics ==
=== Regular season and playoffs ===
			Regular season					Playoffs
Season	Team	League	GP	G	A	Pts	PIM	GP	G	A	Pts	PIM
2012–13	MHK Dubnica	Slovak.2	4	1	0	1	4	—	—	—	—	—
2013–14	HK Dukla Trenčín	Slovak-Jr.	44	9	19	28	81	—	—	—	—	—
2014–15	HK Dukla Trenčín	Slovak-Jr.	18	7	13	20	20	—	—	—	—	—
2014–15	HK Dukla Trenčín	Slovak	28	0	1	1	10	—	—	—	—	—
2015–16	HK Dukla Trenčín	Slovak-Jr.	15	5	11	16	16	5	1	3	4	70
2015–16	HK Dukla Trenčín	Slovak	47	4	12	16	22	5	1	0	1	4
2015–16	HK 95 Považská Bystrica	Slovak.1	3	1	0	1	25	—	—	—	—	—
2016–17	HK Dukla Trenčín	Slovak	56	2	5	7	26	—	—	—	—	—
2017–18	HK Dukla Trenčín	Slovak	51	4	3	7	43	14	1	1	2	12
2017–18	MHK Dubnica	Slovak.1	17	4	2	6	14	—	—	—	—	—
2018–19	HK Dukla Trenčín	Slovak	57	4	5	9	54	6	0	0	0	30
2019–20	HK Dukla Trenčín	Slovak	46	6	10	16	69	—	—	—	—	—
2020–21	HK Dukla Trenčín	Slovak	46	5	9	14	42	10	1	3	4	26
2021–22	HK Dukla Trenčín	Slovak	50	5	6	11	65	4	0	1	1	2
Slovak totals			381	30	51	81	331	39	3	5	8	74
