= Michal Kabáč =

Slovak ice hockey player

- Born: 1 December 1995 (age 30) Trstená, Slovakia
- Height: 6 ft 4 in (193 cm)
- Weight: 218 lb (99 kg; 15 st 8 lb)
- Position: Center
- Shoots: Left
- Slovak team Former teams: HK Dukla Michalovce; MHk 32 Liptovský Mikuláš; HK Orange 20; Madison Capitols; MHC Mountfield; HC '05 Banská Bystrica
- NHL draft: Undrafted
- Playing career: 2012–present

Michal Kabáč (born 1 December 1995) is a Slovak professional ice hockey player who currently playing for HK Dukla Michalovce of the Slovak Extraliga.

Medal record

Ice hockey

Representing Slovakia

World Junior Championships
Bronze medal – third place	2015 Canada	

== Career statistics ==
=== Regular season and playoffs ===
			Regular season					Playoffs
Season	Team	League	GP	G	A	Pts	PIM	GP	G	A	Pts	PIM
2012–13	MHk 32 Liptovský Mikuláš	Slovak-Jr.	43	9	11	20	40	4	0	1	1	4
2012–13	MHk 32 Liptovský Mikuláš	Slovak.1	6	0	0	0	2	—	—	—	—	—
2013–14	MHk 32 Liptovský Mikuláš	Slovak-Jr.	44	14	13	27	93	5	2	0	2	34
2014–15	HK Orange 20	Slovak	20	0	3	3	12	—	—	—	—	—
2014–15	MHk 32 Liptovský Mikuláš	Slovak-Jr.	2	0	1	1	2	—	—	—	—	—
2014–15	Madison Capitols	USHL	24	2	4	6	75	—	—	—	—	—
2015–16	MHC Mountfield	Slovak	49	5	9	14	36	3	0	0	0	0
2016–17	MHk 32 Liptovský Mikuláš	Slovak	43	1	5	6	60	—	—	—	—	—
2017–18	MHk 32 Liptovský Mikuláš	Slovak	9	0	2	2	2	—	—	—	—	—
2017–18	HK Dukla Michalovce	Slovak.1	14	5	4	9	6	—	—	—	—	—
2017–18	HC '05 Banská Bystrica	Slovak	31	8	2	10	22	11	0	0	0	27
2018–19	HC '05 Banská Bystrica	Slovak	49	3	1	4	34	4	0	1	1	0
2019–20	HC '05 Banská Bystrica	Slovak	47	3	6	9	32	—	—	—	—	—
2020–21	HC '05 Banská Bystrica	Slovak	43	9	4	13	62	4	0	0	0	14
2021–22	HC '05 Banská Bystrica	Slovak	45	6	7	13	51	9	0	1	1	14
2022–23	HC '05 Banská Bystrica	Slovak	44	4	7	11	71	7	1	1	2	8
Slovak totals			380	39	46	85	382	38	1	3	4	63

=== International ===
Year	Team	Event	Result	GP	G	A	Pts	PIM
2015	Slovakia	WJC	3rd place, bronze medalist(s)	7	1	0	1	4
Junior totals				7	1	0	1	4
