= Juraj Bezúch =

Slovak ice hockey player

- Born: 20 December 1993 (age 32) Skalica, Slovakia
- Height: 5 ft 10 in (178 cm)
- Weight: 181 lb (82 kg; 12 st 13 lb)
- Position: Left wing
- Shoots: Left
- Slovak 1. Liga team Former teams: Vlci Žilina; HK Skalica; HK Orange 20; HC Baník Sokolov; Vimmerby HC; HC '05 Banská Bystrica; HK Dukla Trenčín; HC Slovan Bratislava; Mountfield HK; HC Slavia Praha; HC Dukla Jihlava; HC Košice; HK Dukla Michalovce; HC Nové Zámky
- NHL draft: Undrafted
- Playing career: 2012–present

Juraj Bezúch (born 20 December 1993) is a Slovak professional ice hockey player who currently playing for Vlci Žilina of the Slovak 1. Liga.

== Career statistics ==
=== Regular season and playoffs ===
			Regular season					Playoffs
Season	Team	League	GP	G	A	Pts	PIM	GP	G	A	Pts	PIM
2010–11	HK Skalica	Slovak-Jr.	7	1	4	5	0	1	0	0	0	0
2011–12	Lethbridge Hurricanes	WHL	67	8	13	21	11	—	—	—	—	—
2012–13	Windsor Spitfires	OHL	4	0	0	0	0	—	—	—	—	—
2012–13	HK Skalica	Slovak-Jr.	16	21	14	35	6	5	1	0	1	2
2012–13	HK Skalica	Slovak	25	1	6	7	47	7	0	0	0	0
2012–13	HK Orange 20	Slovak	3	0	1	1	14	—	—	—	—	—
2013–14	HC Energie Karlovy Vary	MHL	25	6	5	11	8	—	—	—	—	—
2013–14	HC Baník Sokolov	Czech.2	1	0	0	0	0	—	—	—	—	—
2014–15	HK Skalica	Slovak	43	9	9	18	8	—	—	—	—	—
2015–16	Vimmerby HC	Division 1	7	3	1	4	4	—	—	—	—	—
2015–16	HK Skalica	Slovak	32	6	1	7	8	—	—	—	—	—
2015–16	HC '05 Banská Bystrica	Slovak	7	1	0	1	0	7	0	0	0	2
2016–17	HC '05 Banská Bystrica	Slovak	20	2	5	7	0	—	—	—	—	—
2016–17	HK Skalica	Slovak.1	2	3	1	4	0	—	—	—	—	—
2016–17	HK Dukla Trenčín	Slovak	18	3	7	10	4	—	—	—	—	—
2017–18	HC Slovan Bratislava	KHL	2	0	0	0	0	—	—	—	—	—
2017–18	HK Dukla Trenčín	Slovak	54	15	19	34	26	17	5	3	8	10
2018–19	Mountfield HK	Czech	30	3	4	7	18	—	—	—	—	—
2018–19	HC Slavia Praha	Czech.1	3	2	2	4	0	—	—	—	—	—
2018–19	HC Dukla Jihlava	Czech.1	7	1	2	3	0	10	5	2	7	6
2019–20	HC Košice	Slovak	14	1	5	6	20	—	—	—	—	—
2019–20	HK Dukla Trenčín	Slovak	24	8	4	12	16	—	—	—	—	—
2020–21	HK Dukla Trenčín	Slovak	34	8	9	17	16	—	—	—	—	—
2021–22	HK Dukla Trenčín	Slovak	36	7	10	17	29	4	1	2	3	0
KHL totals			2	0	0	0	0	—	—	—	—	—
Czech totals			30	3	4	7	18	—	—	—	—	—
Slovak totals			310	61	76	137	188	35	6	5	11	12

=== International ===
Year	Team	Event	Result	GP	G	A	Pts	PIM
2011	Slovakia	WJC18	10th	6	0	0	0	0
Junior totals				6	0	0	0	0
