= Michal Novák =

Michal Novák may refer to:

- Michal Novák (ice hockey), Slovak ice hockey player
- Michal Novák (skier), Czech cross-country skier
