= Daniel Brejčák =

Slovak ice hockey player

- Born: 29 October 1986 (age 38); Poprad, Czechoslovakia
- Height: 5 ft 8 in (173 cm)
- Weight: 165 lb (75 kg; 11 st 11 lb)
- Position: Defenceman
- Shoots: Left
- Slovak team Former teams: HK Poprad; MHK Kežmarok; HC Košice; SV Kaltern; MsHK Žilina
- NHL draft: Undrafted
- Playing career: 2006–present

Daniel Brejčák (born 29 October 1986) is a Slovak professional ice hockey player who currently playing for HK Poprad of the Slovak Extraliga.

== Career ==
He previously played for with MHK Kežmarok, HC Košice, SV Kaltern and MsHK Žilina.

== Career statistics ==
=== Regular season and playoffs ===
			Regular season					Playoffs
Season	Team	League	GP	G	A	Pts	PIM	GP	G	A	Pts	PIM
2003–04	HK Poprad	Slovak U18	48	1	7	8	61	6	0	0	0	0
2004–05	HK Poprad	Slovak-Jr.	38	5	8	13	14	5	1	0	1	2
2005–06	HK Poprad	Slovak-Jr.	46	5	8	13	54	4	0	0	0	2
2006–07	MHK Kežmarok	Slovak.1	42	4	15	19	46	12	0	0	0	0
2007–08	MHK Kežmarok	Slovak	45	1	4	5	32	—	—	—	—	—
2008–09	MHK Kežmarok	Slovak	49	2	4	6	36	—	—	—	—	—
2009–10	HK Poprad	Slovak	43	2	5	7	30	5	0	0	0	0
2009–10	MHK Kežmarok	Slovak.1	4	1	2	3	0	—	—	—	—	—
2010–11	HK Poprad	Slovak	53	3	11	14	34	15	0	1	1	14
2011–12	HK Poprad	Slovak	40	0	10	10	38	1	0	0	0	0
2012–13	HC Košice	Slovak	5	0	0	0	6	—	—	—	—	—
2012–13	HK Poprad	Slovak	14	1	4	5	12	6	1	1	2	4
2013–14	HK Poprad	Slovak	42	2	6	8	22	5	0	1	1	0
2014–15	SV Kaltern	Italian	13	1	3	4	18	—	—	—	—	—
2014–15	HK Poprad	Slovak	23	0	5	5	14	10	0	1	1	14
2015–16	MsHK Žilina	Slovak	52	5	12	17	40	4	0	4	4	0
2016–17	MsHK Žilina	Slovak	52	1	13	14	24	11	1	4	5	4
2017–18	HK Poprad	Slovak	49	5	15	20	14	4	1	0	1	0
2018–19	HK Poprad	Slovak	40	5	12	17	8	9	1	1	2	4
2019–20	HK Poprad	Slovak	46	1	11	12	24	—	—	—	—	—
2020–21	HK Poprad	Slovak	42	2	20	22	22	15	0	3	3	6
2021–22	HK Poprad	Slovak	49	3	11	14	55	6	2	0	2	6
2022–23	Did not play
Slovak totals			644	33	143	176	411	91	6	16	22	52
