= Lukáš Handlovský =

Slovak ice hockey player

- Born: 3 August 1986 (age 39) Banská Bystrica, Czechoslovakia
- Height: 6 ft 0 in (183 cm)
- Weight: 185 lb (84 kg; 13 st 3 lb)
- Position: Forward
- Shoots: Right
- Slovak team Former teams: Free agent HC '05 Banská Bystrica; HC Sparta Praha; NED Hockey Nymburk; SK Horácká Slavia Třebíč; BK Mladá Boleslav; HC Vrchlabí; HC Slovan Ústečtí Lvi; MsHK Žilina; HKM Zvolen; HK Poprad; MHk 32 Liptovský Mikuláš; HC 19 Humenné; HC Nové Zámky
- Playing career: 2006–present

Lukáš Handlovský (born 3 August 1986) is a Slovak professional ice hockey player who is currently a free agent. He last played for HC Nové Zámky of the Slovak Extraliga.

== Career ==
He previously played for with HC '05 Banská Bystrica, HC Sparta Praha, SK Horácká Slavia Třebíč, BK Mladá Boleslav, MsHK Žilina, HKM Zvolen and HK Poprad.

== Career statistics ==
=== Regular season and playoffs ===
			Regular season					Playoffs
Season	Team	League	GP	G	A	Pts	PIM	GP	G	A	Pts	PIM
2003–04	HC '05 Banská Bystrica	Slovak-Jr.	14	9	4	13	67	—	—	—	—	—
2003–04	HC '05 Banská Bystrica	Slovak.1	23	4	1	5	27	—	—	—	—	—
2004–05	HC Sparta Praha	Czech-Jr.	42	11	25	36	73	8	3	5	8	6
2004–05	NED Hockey Nymburk	Czech.2	2	1	0	1	0	4	3	0	3	4
2005–06	HC Sparta Praha	Czech-Jr.	46	21	18	39	84	3	2	2	4	38
2005–06	HC Sparta Praha	Czech	1	0	0	0	0	—	—	—	—	—
2005–06	NED Hockey Nymburk	Czech.2	4	2	1	3	2	4	2	1	3	2
2006–07	SK Horácká Slavia Třebíč	Czech-Jr.1	1	0	1	1	0	—	—	—	—	—
2006–07	SK Horácká Slavia Třebíč	Czech.1	36	5	10	15	24	—	—	—	—	—
2007–08	BK Mladá Boleslav	Czech.1	44	12	15	27	38	15	2	1	3	22
2008–09	BK Mladá Boleslav	Czech	52	13	11	24	32	—	—	—	—	—
2009–10	BK Mladá Boleslav	Czech	50	4	4	8	81	—	—	—	—	—
2009–10	HC Vrchlabí	Czech.1	1	0	0	0	0	—	—	—	—	—
2010–11	BK Mladá Boleslav	Czech	23	1	1	2	8	—	—	—	—	—
2010–11	HC Slovan Ústečtí Lvi	Czech.1	25	9	7	16	12	14	8	5	13	18
2011–12	BK Mladá Boleslav	Czech	1	0	0	0	0	—	—	—	—	—
2011–12	HC Slovan Ústečtí Lvi	Czech.1	48	18	18	36	50	16	1	8	9	14
2012–13	HC Slovan Ústečtí Lvi	Czech.1	51	12	14	26	38	6	0	0	0	6
2013–14	HC '05 Banská Bystrica	Slovak	51	16	19	35	60	11	3	4	7	6
2014–15	HC '05 Banská Bystrica	Slovak	55	16	24	40	36	18	4	2	6	18
2015–16	HC '05 Banská Bystrica	Slovak	29	3	7	10	8	—	—	—	—	—
2015–16	MsHK Žilina	Slovak	25	9	16	25	8	4	0	1	1	4
2016–17	MsHK Žilina	Slovak	55	18	26	44	48	7	2	4	6	28
2017–18	MsHK Žilina	Slovak	43	17	14	31	40	6	1	1	2	2
2018–19	HKM Zvolen	Slovak	50	20	21	41	38	12	4	0	4	8
2019–20	HKM Zvolen	Slovak	11	1	1	2	28	—	—	—	—	—
2019–20	HK Poprad	Slovak	41	12	16	28	40	—	—	—	—	—
2020–21	HK Poprad	Slovak	50	19	14	33	42	13	4	4	8	8
2021–22	HK Poprad	Slovak	18	2	4	6	12	—	—	—	—	—
2021–22	MHk 32 Liptovský Mikuláš	Slovak	27	8	13	21	14	—	—	—	—	—
2022–23	MHk 32 Liptovský Mikuláš	Slovak	49	18	11	29	18	—	—	—	—	—
Slovak totals			504	159	186	345	392	71	18	16	34	74

=== International ===
Year	Team	Event	Result	GP	G	A	Pts	PIM
2004	Slovakia	WJC18	6th	6	2	3	5	0
Junior totals				6	2	3	5	0
