= Samuel Petráš =

Samuel Petráš may refer to:

- Samuel Petráš (footballer) (born 1999), Slovak footballer
- Samuel Petráš (ice hockey) (born 1995), Slovak ice hockey player
