= Miroslav Kristín =

Slovak ice hockey right winger

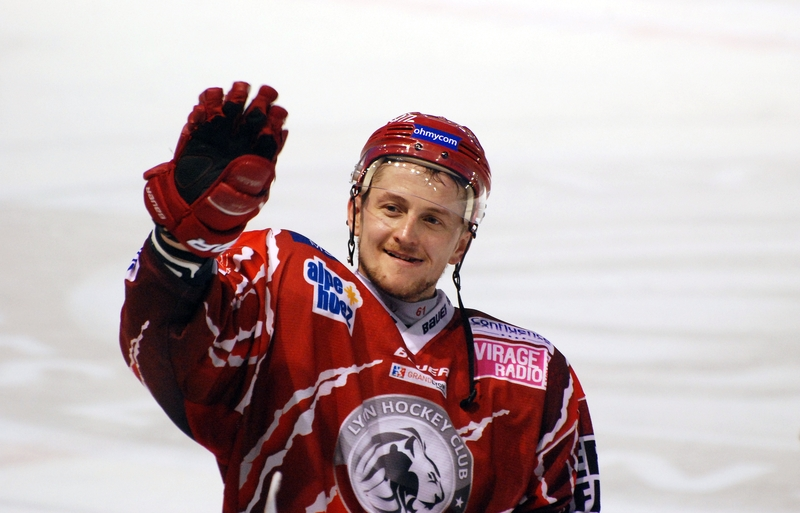
- Born: January 22, 1982 (age 43) Trenčín, Czechoslovakia
- Height: 5 ft 11 in (180 cm)
- Weight: 181 lb (82 kg; 12 st 13 lb)
- Position: Right wing
- Shoots: Right
- Slovak 1. Liga team Former teams: HK Spartak Dubnica nad Váhom; MsHK Žilina; HC Dukla Trenčín; Ducs de Dijon
- Playing career: 1998–present

Miroslav Kristín (born January 22, 1982) is a Slovak professional ice hockey right winger currently playing for HK Spartak Dubnica nad Váhom of the Slovak 1. Liga.

He previously played in the Slovak Extraliga for MHK Dubnica, HK Dukla Trenčín and MsHK Žilina. He also played in the Ligue Magnus in France for Ducs de Dijon from 2005 to 2011.

Kristín played in the World Junior Ice Hockey Championships in 2001 and 2002 for Slovakia.

Kristín's younger brother Matej Kristín is a goaltender also currently playing for HK Spartak Dubnica nad Váhom.
