= Alex Tamáši =

Slovak ice hockey player

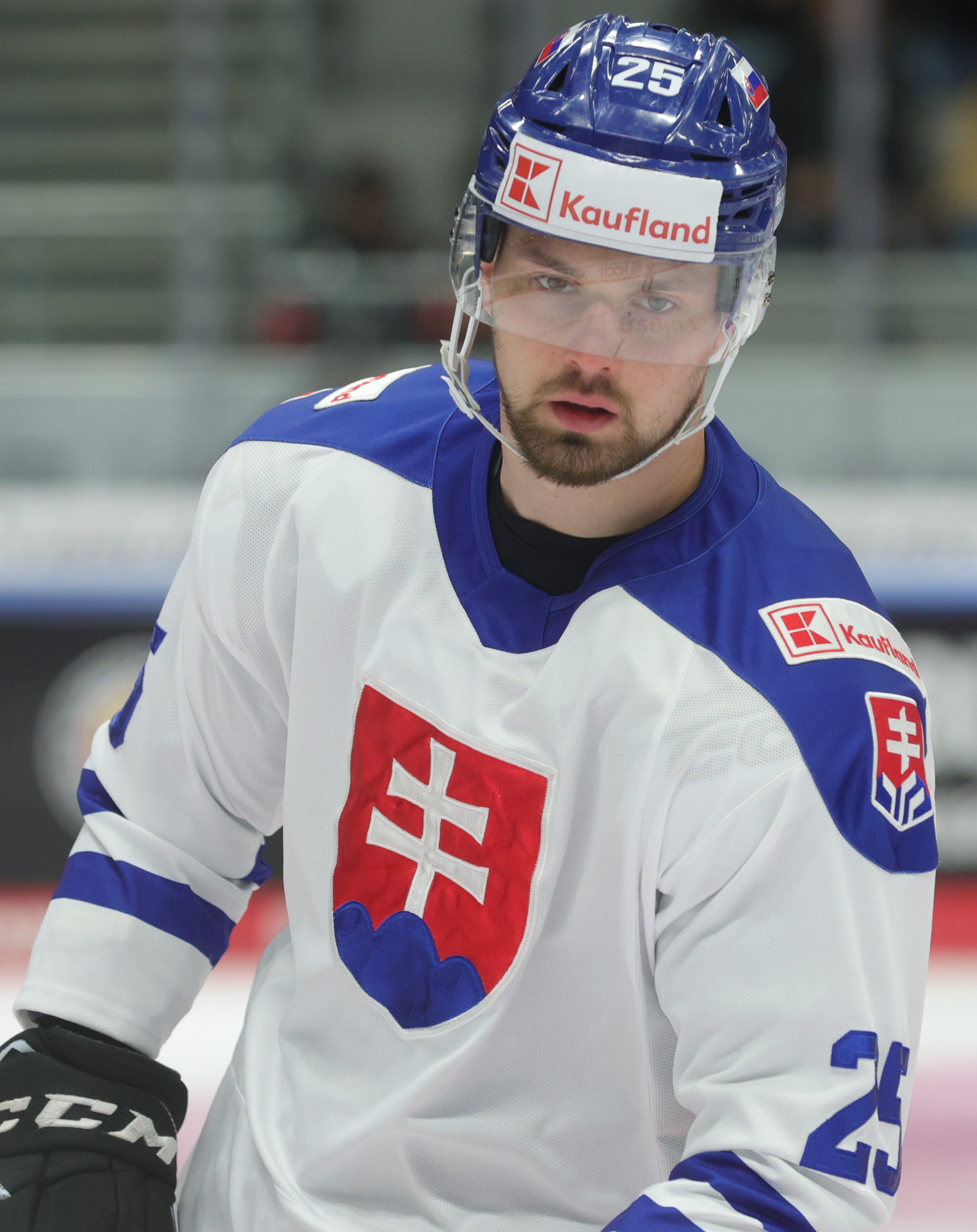
- Born: 25 March 1998 (age 28) Rimavská Sobota, Slovakia
- Height: 6 ft 0 in (183 cm)
- Weight: 187 lb (85 kg; 13 st 5 lb)
- Position: Center
- Shoots: Left
- Czech team Former teams: Mountfield HK; HC '05 Banská Bystrica; HC 07 Detva; HK Orange 20; MHk 32 Liptovský Mikuláš; Bratislava Capitals
- National team: Slovakia
- NHL draft: Undrafted
- Playing career: 2016–present

Alex Tamáši (born 25 March 1998) is a Slovak professional ice hockey player who currently playing for Mountfield HK of the Czech Extraliga.

== Career statistics ==
=== Regular season and playoffs ===
			Regular season					Playoffs
Season	Team	League	GP	G	A	Pts	PIM	GP	G	A	Pts	PIM
2014–15	HC '05 Banská Bystrica	Slovak-Jr.	18	4	4	8	2	3	1	0	1	2
2015–16	HC '05 Banská Bystrica	Slovak-Jr.	36	18	14	32	16	13	4	7	11	6
2016–17	HC '05 Banská Bystrica	Slovak-Jr.	8	7	4	11	0	1	2	0	2	4
2016–17	HC '05 Banská Bystrica	Slovak	36	5	7	12	8	—	—	—	—	—
2016–17	HC 07 Detva	Slovak.1	3	0	1	1	2	—	—	—	—	—
2017–18	HC '05 Banská Bystrica	Slovak-Jr.	5	5	2	7	0	2	3	2	5	2
2017–18	HC '05 Banská Bystrica	Slovak	10	2	2	4	0	2	0	0	0	0
2017–18	HK Orange 20	Slovak	22	4	7	11	0	—	—	—	—	—
2017–18	HK Orange 20	Slovak.1	5	2	7	9	0	—	—	—	—	—
2018–19	HC '05 Banská Bystrica	Slovak	12	3	1	4	0	—	—	—	—	—
2018–19	MHk 32 Liptovský Mikuláš	Slovak	53	6	10	16	10	—	—	—	—	—
2019–20	HC '05 Banská Bystrica	Slovak	22	0	4	4	2	—	—	—	—	—
2019–20	Bratislava Capitals	Slovak.1	1	0	0	0	0	—	—	—	—	—
2019–20	MHk 32 Liptovský Mikuláš	Slovak	14	4	2	6	4	—	—	—	—	—
2020–21	HC '05 Banská Bystrica	Slovak	49	7	9	16	18	4	0	0	0	0
2021–22	HC '05 Banská Bystrica	Slovak	44	7	14	21	6	9	2	1	3	0
2022–23	HC '05 Banská Bystrica	Slovak	45	13	15	28	6	7	1	1	2	6
Slovak totals			307	51	71	122	54	22	3	2	5	6

=== International ===
Year	Team	Event	Result	GP	G	A	Pts	PIM
2018	Slovakia	WJC	7th	5	0	2	2	0
2022	Slovakia	WC	8th	8	1	1	2	0
2023	Slovakia	WC	9th	6	0	0	0	2
Junior totals				5	0	2	2	0
Senior totals				14	1	1	2	6
