= Peter Sojčík =

Slovak ice hockey forward

- Born: 8 September 1986 (age 38); Dubnica nad Váhom, Czechoslovakia
- Height: 5 ft 9 in (175 cm)
- Weight: 187 lb (85 kg; 13 st 5 lb)
- Position: Forward
- Shoots: Left
- Slovak team Former teams: HK Dukla Trenčín; HK Panthers Považská Bystrica; HC Kometa Brno; SHK Hodonín; SK Horácká Slavia Třebíč; Orli Znojmo; HK 91 Senica; HC Dukla Jihlava; HC Košice; MHK Dubnica nad Váhom
- Playing career: 2004–present

Peter Sojčík (born 8 September 1986) is a Slovak professional ice hockey forward who has played over 500 games in the Slovak Extraliga. He currently playing for HK Dukla Trenčín of the Slovak Extraliga.

== Career ==
Sojčík began his career with Dukla Trenčín's academy and made his senior debut for the team during the 2004–05 Slovak Extraliga season. From 2006 to 2011, Sojčík played in the 1st Czech National Hockey League for HC Kometa Brno, SK Horácká Slavia Třebíč, Orli Znojmo and HC Dukla Jihlava.

Sojčík returned to Dukla Trenčín on July 25, 2011 and remained with the team until 2013 when he joined HC Košice. He would then return to Dukla Trenčín for a third spell on December 9, 2015.

Sojčík signed an extension with Dukla Trenčín on July 17, 2020.

== Career statistics ==
=== Regular season and playoffs ===
			Regular season					Playoffs
Season	Team	League	GP	G	A	Pts	PIM	GP	G	A	Pts	PIM
2003–04	HK Dukla Trenčín	Slovak-Jr.	2	0	0	0	0	—	—	—	—	—
2004–05	HK Dukla Trenčín	Slovak-Jr.	30	15	19	34	40	6	2	6	8	6
2004–05	HK Dukla Trenčín	Slovak	9	1	0	1	2	3	0	0	0	0
2005–06	HK Dukla Trenčín	Slovak-Jr.	39	33	33	66	63	7	6	5	11	14
2005–06	HK Panthers Považská Bystrica	Slovak.1	4	0	1	1	4	1	0	1	1	0
2006–07	HC Kometa Brno	Czech.1	40	8	7	15	18	4	0	0	0	0
2007–08	HC Kometa Brno	Czech.1	29	5	1	6	10	2	0	0	0	0
2007–08	SHK Hodonín	Czech.2	8	2	9	11	6	7	2	0	2	2
2008–09	SK Horácká Slavia Třebíč	Czech.1	46	12	8	20	24	—	—	—	—	—
2009–10	Orli Znojmo	Czech.1	17	1	2	3	6	—	—	—	—	—
2010–11	HK 91 Senica	Slovak.1	30	11	16	27	56	—	—	—	—	—
2010–11	HC Dukla Jihlava	Czech.1	13	1	3	4	2	10	1	0	1	4
2011–12	HK Dukla Trenčín	Slovak	55	18	15	33	14	10	4	2	6	0
2012–13	HK Dukla Trenčín	Slovak	52	17	30	47	22	4	0	0	0	4
2013–14	HC Košice	Slovak	52	10	24	34	30	15	4	5	9	2
2014–15	HC Košice	Slovak	56	11	8	19	12	17	5	4	9	6
2015–16	HC Košice	Slovak	14	3	6	9	6	—	—	—	—	—
2015–16	HK Dukla Trenčín	Slovak	10	4	0	4	14	5	0	1	1	2
2016–17	HK Dukla Trenčín	Slovak	56	10	14	24	42	—	—	—	—	—
2017–18	HK Dukla Trenčín	Slovak	56	12	15	27	18	17	6	7	13	8
2018–19	HK Dukla Trenčín	Slovak	52	17	19	36	14	6	0	3	3	0
2019–20	HK Dukla Trenčín	Slovak	48	15	13	28	28	—	—	—	—	—
2020–21	HK Dukla Trenčín	Slovak	24	5	4	9	6	10	3	1	4	0
Slovak totals			484	123	148	271	208	87	22	23	45	22
