= Konsta Mesikämmen =

Finnish ice hockey defenceman

- Born: 14 November 1995 (age 30) Turku, Finland
- Height: 6 ft 1 in (185 cm)
- Weight: 187 lb (85 kg; 13 st 5 lb)
- Position: Defence
- Shoots: Left
- Erste Liga team Former teams: Gyergyói HK; KeuPa HT; Lukko; Imatran Ketterä; HK Dukla Michalovce; HK Dukla Trenčín; GKS Tychy; Chamonix Mont-Blanc; MHk 32 Liptovský Mikuláš; Ferencvárosi TC
- National team: Romania
- Playing career: 2016–present

Konsta Mesikämmen (born 14 November 1993) is a Finnish professional ice hockey defenceman who plays for Gyergyói HK of the Erste Liga.

Mesikämmen previously played ten games in Liiga for Lukko during the 2017–18 season. He joined HK Dukla Michalovce on May 30, 2019.

His grandfather, Ilkka Mesikämmen, played in the 1964 Winter Olympics for Finland.
