= Tomáš Bokroš =

Slovak ice hockey player

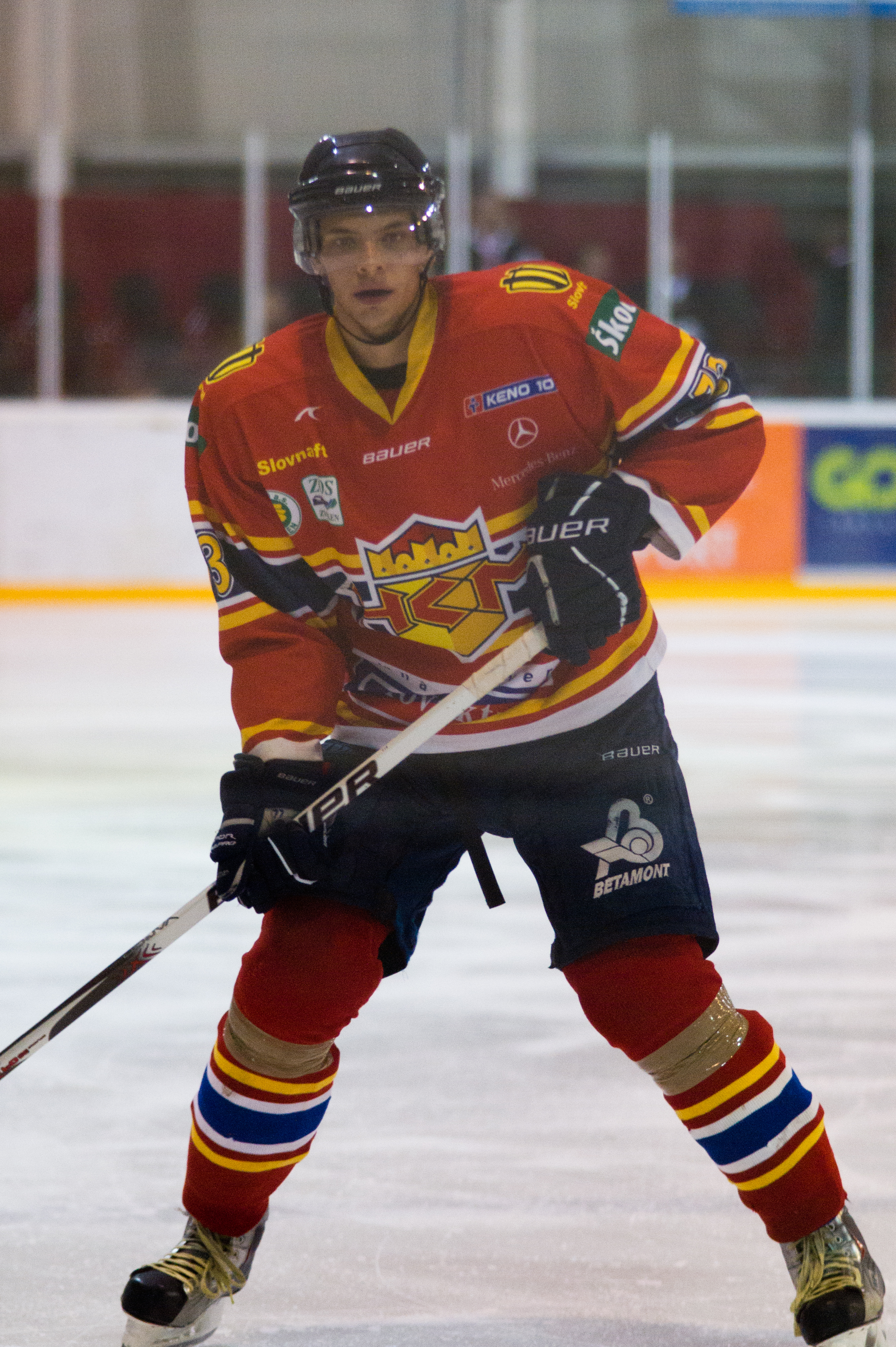
- Bokroš in 2010
- Born: 19 June 1989 (age 36) Trenčín, Czechoslovakia
- Height: 6 ft 3 in (191 cm)
- Weight: 194 lb (88 kg; 13 st 12 lb)
- Position: Defence
- Shoots: Right
- Slovak team Former teams: HK Dukla Trenčín; LHK Jestřábi Prostějov; VHK Vsetín; HKM Zvolen; MsHK Žilina; ŠHK 37 Piešťany; Södertälje SK; HC Dynamo Pardubice; HK Dukla Michalovce; HK Poprad; MHk 32 Liptovský Mikuláš
- Playing career: 2008–present

Tomáš Bokroš (born 19 June 1989) is a Slovak professional ice hockey defenceman who currently playing for HK Dukla Trenčín of the Slovak Extraliga.

== Career statistics ==
=== Regular season and playoffs ===
			Regular season					Playoffs
Season	Team	League	GP	G	A	Pts	PIM	GP	G	A	Pts	PIM
