= Rastislav Gašpar =

Slovak ice hockey player

- Born: 13 October 1994 (age 30); Banská Bystrica, Slovakia
- Height: 6 ft 3 in (191 cm)
- Weight: 196 lb (89 kg; 14 st 0 lb)
- Position: Right wing
- Shoots: Right
- Slovak team Former teams: HC '05 Banská Bystrica; HK Orange 20; HC 07 Detva; HK 36 Skalica; HC Slovan Bratislava
- Playing career: 2013–present

Rastislav Gašpar (born 13 October 1994) is a Slovak professional ice hockey player who is currently playing for HC '05 Banská Bystrica of the Slovak Extraliga. .

Gašpar previously played in Slovak Extraliga for Detva. On November 5, 2020, Gašpar moved to another team in Slovakia. He signed for HC Slovan Bratislava a multi-year contract valid until 30 April 2022 and with the possibility of another option until April 2023.

== Career statistics ==
=== Regular season and playoffs ===
			Regular season					Playoffs
Season	Team	League	GP	G	A	Pts	PIM	GP	G	A	Pts	PIM
2010–11	HK Brezno	Slovak U18.1	32	30	19	49	24	—	—	—	—	—
2010–11	HC '05 Banská Bystrica	Slovak U18	1	0	0	0	2	—	—	—	—	—
2011–12	HC '05 Banská Bystrica	Slovak U18	42	19	22	41	24	—	—	—	—	—
2012–13	HC '05 Banská Bystrica	Slovak-Jr.	32	10	27	37	8	12	9	4	13	4
2013–14	HK Orange 20	Slovak	19	10	5	15	4	—	—	—	—	—
2013–14	HC 07 Detva	Slovak.1	0	0	0	0	0	1	0	0	0	0
2013–14	HC '05 Banská Bystrica	Slovak	15	2	1	3	2	1	0	0	0	0
2014–15	HC '05 Banská Bystrica	Slovak-Jr.	16	18	14	32	92	—	—	—	—	—
2014–15	HC '05 Banská Bystrica	Slovak	21	2	1	3	4	—	—	—	—	—
2014–15	HK 36 Skalica	Slovak-Jr.	2	3	0	3	0	—	—	—	—	—
2014–15	HK 36 Skalica	Slovak	2	0	0	0	0	—	—	—	—	—
2014–15	HC 07 Detva	Slovak.1	13	7	5	12	10	2	0	0	0	0
2015–16	HC '05 Banská Bystrica	Slovak	23	0	3	3	6	—	—	—	—	—
2015–16	HC 07 Detva	Slovak.1	19	4	14	18	4	7	0	0	0	0
2016–17	HC 07 Detva	Slovak.1	49	25	38	63	18	11	3	5	8	6
2017–18	HC 07 Detva	Slovak	44	9	8	17	18	—	—	—	—	—
2018–19	HC 07 Detva	Slovak	43	12	13	25	16	5	0	0	0	0
2019–20	HC 07 Detva	Slovak	55	16	16	32	24	—	—	—	—	—
2020–21	HC 07 Detva	Slovak	6	5	5	10	2	—	—	—	—	—
2020–21	HC Slovan Bratislava	Slovak	25	11	14	25	4	10	4	10	14	4
2021–22	HC Slovan Bratislava	Slovak	29	7	11	18	8	2	1	0	1	0
2022–23	HC '05 Banská Bystrica	Slovak	50	10	19	29	4	5	1	4	5	0
Slovak totals			332	84	96	180	92	23	6	14	20	4

== Awards and honors ==
Award	Year
Slovak
Champion	2022
