= Dalibor Bortňák =

Slovak ice hockey centre

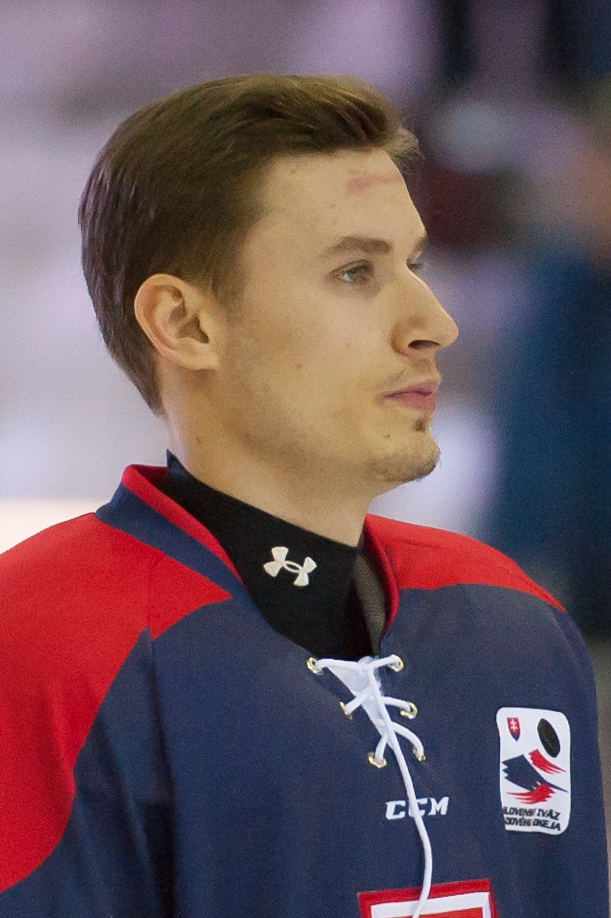
- Born: 17 February 1991 (age 35) Prešov, Czechoslovakia
- Height: 6 ft 4 in (193 cm)
- Weight: 203 lb (92 kg; 14 st 7 lb)
- Position: Centre
- Shoots: Left
- Slovak team Former teams: HK Spišská Nová Ves; HC Bílí Tygři Liberec; Kamloops Blazers; HC Benátky nad Jizerou; HKM Zvolen; HC Košice; HC '05 Banská Bystrica; HK Nitra; HC Slovan Bratislava; HK Poprad; Steinbach Black Wings Linz
- Playing career: 2011–present

Dalibor Bortňák (born 17 February 1991) is a Slovak professional ice hockey centre who is currently playing for HK Spišská Nová Ves of the Slovak Extraliga.

== Career ==
After playing in junior level for HC Prešov and HC Bílí Tygři Liberec, Bortňák moved to the junior Canadian Hockey League where he was drafted 18th overall by the Western Hockey League's Kamloops Blazers in the 2008 CHL Import Draft. He spent three seasons with the Blazers before returning to Liberec to sign for their senior team.

Bortňák moved to HKm Zvolen of the Tipsport Liga on January 12, 2014. He then joined HC Košice for the 2015–16 season, but on February 13, 2016, he was traded to HC '05 Banská Bystrica. On September 3, 2018, Bortňák joined HK Nitra. After one season in Nitra, Bortňák returned to Košice on May 28, 2019.

== Career statistics ==
=== Regular season and playoffs ===
			Regular season					Playoffs
Season	Team	League	GP	G	A	Pts	PIM	GP	G	A	Pts	PIM
2007–08	HC Bílí Tygři Liberec	Czech-Jr.	15	2	2	4	8	—	—	—	—	—
2008–09	Kamloops Blazers	WHL	68	8	20	28	40	4	0	0	0	2
2009–10	Kamloops Blazers	WHL	45	9	18	27	46	4	1	2	3	2
2010–11	Kamloops Blazers	WHL	57	13	31	44	64	—	—	—	—	—
2011–12	HC Bílí Tygři Liberec	Czech	34	2	2	4	8	9	0	0	0	2
2011–12	HC Benátky nad Jizerou	Czech.1	9	1	3	4	0	—	—	—	—	—
2012–13	HC Bílí Tygři Liberec	Czech	18	3	5	8	2	—	—	—	—	—
2012–13	HC Benátky nad Jizerou	Czech.1	27	5	8	13	38	—	—	—	—	—
2013–14	HC Benátky nad Jizerou	Czech.1	16	0	4	4	6	—	—	—	—	—
2013–14	HKM Zvolen	Slovak	24	11	4	15	4	—	—	—	—	—
2014–15	HKM Zvolen	Slovak	52	8	16	24	60	4	1	1	2	4
2015–16	HC Košice	Slovak	41	4	6	10	12	—	—	—	—	—
2015–16	HC '05 Banská Bystrica	Slovak	7	2	1	3	2	17	3	2	5	8
2016–17	HC '05 Banská Bystrica	Slovak	49	10	22	32	62	15	2	4	6	16
2017–18	HC '05 Banská Bystrica	Slovak	31	7	7	14	22	16	0	0	0	4
2018–19	HK Nitra	Slovak	54	10	21	31	24	18	0	4	4	12
2019–20	HC Košice	Slovak	53	8	10	18	46	—	—	—	—	—
2020–21	HC Slovan Bratislava	Slovak	46	3	8	11	24	10	0	0	0	4
2021–22	HK Poprad	Slovak	8	1	1	2	6	—	—	—	—	—
Czech totals			52	5	7	12	10	9	0	0	0	2
Slovak totals			365	64	96	160	262	80	6	11	17	48

=== International ===
Year	Team	Event	Result	GP	G	A	Pts	PIM
2009	Slovakia	WJC18	7th	5	1	1	2	4
2011	Slovakia	WJC	8th	6	0	2	2	8
Junior totals				11	1	3	4	12
