= Ville Korhonen (ice hockey) =

Finnish ice hockey player

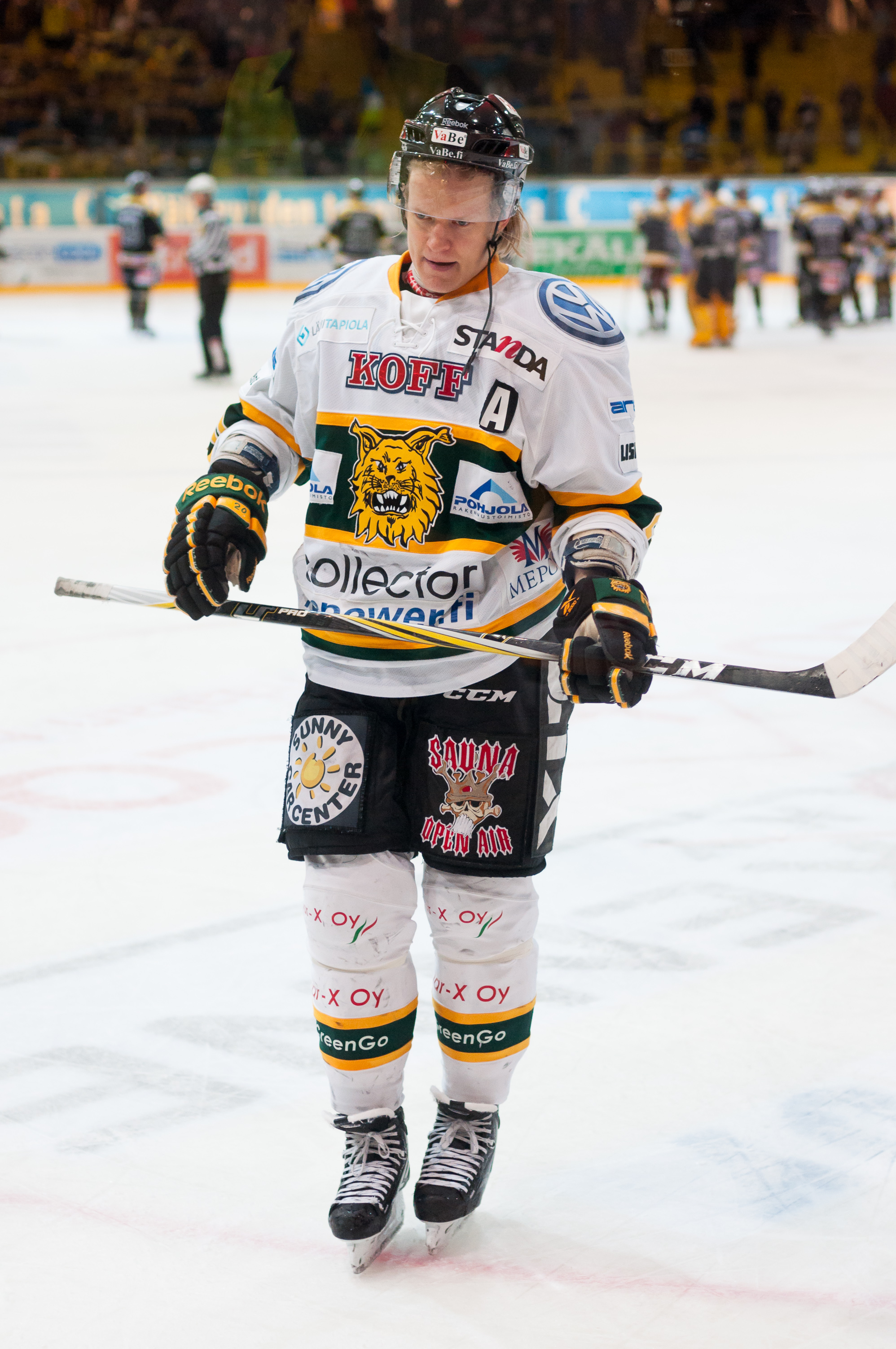
- Born: May 20, 1987 (age 38) Tampere, Finland
- Height: 6 ft 0 in (183 cm)
- Weight: 198 lb (90 kg; 14 st 2 lb)
- Position: Left wing
- Shot: Left
- Played for: Ilves; LeKi; Espoo Blues; VIK Västerås HK; Ässät Pori; Schwenninger Wild Wings; Villacher SV; HK Dukla Michalovce
- Playing career: 2005–2022

Ville Korhonen (born May 20, 1987) is a Finnish professional ice hockey forward who is currently an unrestricted free agent. He has previously played the majority of his professional career in his native Finland, with Ilves Tampere, Espoo Blues and Ässät Pori. On August 26, 2014, Korhonen accepted an initial two-month try-out contract with the Blues.

After two seasons with Ässät, Korhonen left the Liiga as a free agent to sign a one-year deal with German outfit, Schwenninger Wild Wings of the DEL for the 2018–19 season, on May 1, 2018. In 36 games for the Wild Wings, Korhonen collected 8 goals and 18 points, unable to help Schwenninger qualify for the post-season. He left the club at the conclusion of his contract.

== Career statistics ==
			Regular season					Playoffs
Season	Team	League	GP	G	A	Pts	PIM	GP	G	A	Pts	PIM
2004–05	Ilves	U20 SM-liiga	37	9	12	21	12	8	0	1	1	0
2005–06	Ilves	U20 SM-liiga	16	6	7	13	6	2	2	0	2	2
2005–06	Ilves	SM-liiga	47	3	2	5	8	4	0	1	1	0
2005–06	Finland U20	Mestis	2	1	0	1	0	—	—	—	—	—
2006–07	Ilves	U20 SM-liiga	10	7	7	14	16	3	2	0	2	2
2006–07	Ilves	SM-liiga	52	1	5	6	24	7	0	1	1	4
2006–07	Finland U20	Mestis	2	1	0	1	0	—	—	—	—	—
2007–08	Ilves	U20 SM-liiga	4	2	3	5	0	—	—	—	—	—
2007–08	Ilves	SM-liiga	39	3	2	5	37	9	1	0	1	4
2007–08	LeKi	Mestis	12	4	5	9	0	—	—	—	—	—
2008–09	Ilves	SM-liiga	51	4	1	5	14	3	0	0	0	2
2008–09	LeKi	Mestis	8	1	5	6	4	—	—	—	—	—
2009–10	Ilves	SM-liiga	56	12	8	20	8	—	—	—	—	—
2009–10	LeKi	Mestis	1	1	1	2	0	—	—	—	—	—
2010–11	Ilves	SM-liiga	59	11	15	26	10	6	1	1	2	2
2011–12	Ilves	SM-liiga	55	9	5	14	12	—	—	—	—	—
2012–13	Ilves	SM-liiga	60	7	9	16	74	—	—	—	—	—
2013–14	Ilves	Liiga	48	7	8	15	18	—	—	—	—	—
2014–15	Espoo Blues	Liiga	56	18	19	37	28	4	1	3	4	2
2015–16	Espoo Blues	Liiga	27	8	3	11	6	—	—	—	—	—
2015–16	VIK Västerås HK	HockeyAllsvenskan	15	2	2	4	2	—	—	—	—	—
2016–17	Porin Ässät	Liiga	59	9	23	32	12	3	1	0	1	0
2017–18	Porin Ässät	Liiga	56	11	16	27	20	7	1	1	2	8
2018–19	Schwenninger Wild Wings	DEL	36	8	10	18	18	—	—	—	—	—
2019–20	Villacher SV	EBEL	3	0	0	0	2	—	—	—	—	—
2019–20	HK Dukla Michalovce	Slovak	31	14	15	29	4	—	—	—	—	—
2020–21	HK Dukla Michalovce	Slovak	34	13	9	22	10	12	0	6	6	4
2021–22	HC Gherdëina	AlpsHL	36	19	26	45	10	8	2	6	8	4
2021–22	HC Gherdëina	Italy	3	1	3	4	2	—	—	—	—	—
Liiga totals			665	103	116	219	271	43	5	7	12	22
