= Tipsport Kaufland Cup =

Slovak ice hockey competition

- Current season, competition or edition: 2020 Tipsport Kaufland Cup
- Tipsport Kaufland Cup logo
- Sport: Ice Hockey
- Founded: 2020
- No. of teams: 16 (group stage)
- Country: Slovakia
- Broadcaster: RTVS (Slovakia)
- Website: www.hockeyslovakia.sk

The Tipsport Kaufland Cup is the national ice hockey cup competition in the Slovakia. It was first played in 2020.

== Previous winners ==
- 2020 – HK Nitra
