= Radek Deyl =

Slovak ice hockey player

- Born: 14 September 1989 (age 36) Košice, Czechoslovakia
- Height: 6 ft 0 in (183 cm)
- Weight: 185 lb (84 kg; 13 st 3 lb)
- Position: Defenceman
- Shoots: Left
- Slovak team Former teams: HC Košice; HK Trebišov; HK Orange 20; HC 46 Bardejov; HC Energie Karlovy Vary; HC Nové Zámky; HK Dukla Michalovce; HC Gherdëina; Étoile Noire de Strasbourg; Nice hockey Côte d'Azur
- NHL draft: Undrafted
- Playing career: 2007–present

Radek Deyl (born 14 September 1989) is a Slovak professional ice hockey defenceman currently playing for HC Košice of the Slovak Extraliga.

== Career ==
Deyl is a product of HC Košice youth system. He was a member of the HK Orange 20 project to preparation for the 2009 World Junior Ice Hockey Championships. He overall played 24 games and earned 8 points for HK Orange in the 2008–09 season. In the next season he was a part of the HC Košice roster, playing 45 games in the regular season and 16 games in the playoffs. He is the Slovak Extraliga champion with Košice from 2008–09, 2009–10, 2010–11 and 2013–14.

On June 9, 2014, Deyl signed with HC Karlovy Vary of the Czech Extraliga. On October 11, 2015, Deyl returned to Košice.

On August 28, 2017, he joined HC Nové Zámky, however his spell only lasted until October 2017 when he joined HC Gherdëina after a two-game spell with HK Dukla Michalovce.

On January 30, 2018, Deyl re-signed for Dukla Michalovce for the 1. Liga playoffs, but due to issues he remained in Italy until after Michalovce's first playoff game against HK Prešov. On June 20, 2018, Deyl signed for French side Étoile Noire de Strasbourg of the Ligue Magnus.

== International play ==
Deyl participated at the 2009 World Junior Ice Hockey Championships, recording 1 assist in 7 games. Slovakia finished 4th at the tournament.

== Career statistics ==
=== Regular season and playoffs ===
			Regular season					Playoffs
Season	Team	League	GP	G	A	Pts	PIM	GP	G	A	Pts	PIM

=== International ===
Year	Team	Event	Result	GP	G	A	Pts	PIM
2009	Slovakia	WJC	4th	7	0	1	1	4
Junior totals				7	0	1	1	4

== Awards and honours ==
Award	Year
Slovak Extraliga
Champion	2009, 2010, 2011, 2014, 2023
