= Ivan Ďatelinka =

Slovak ice hockey player

- Born: March 6, 1983 (age 43) Topoľčany, Czechoslovakia
- Height: 6 ft 5 in (196 cm)
- Weight: 220 lb (100 kg; 15 st 10 lb)
- Position: Defenceman
- Shoots: Left
- Slovak team Former teams: HC '05 Banská Bystrica; HC Topoľčany; Iskra Partizánske; HK Martin; MHK Dolný Kubín; HC Slovan Bratislava; HK Skalica
- NHL draft: Undrafted
- Playing career: 2000–present

Ivan Ďatelinka (born March 6, 1983) is a Slovak professional ice hockey defenceman who is currently playing for HC '05 Banská Bystrica of the Slovak Extraliga.

== Career statistics ==
=== Regular season and playoffs ===
			Regular season					Playoffs
Season	Team	League	GP	G	A	Pts	PIM	GP	G	A	Pts	PIM
