= Markus Västilä =

Finnish ice hockey player

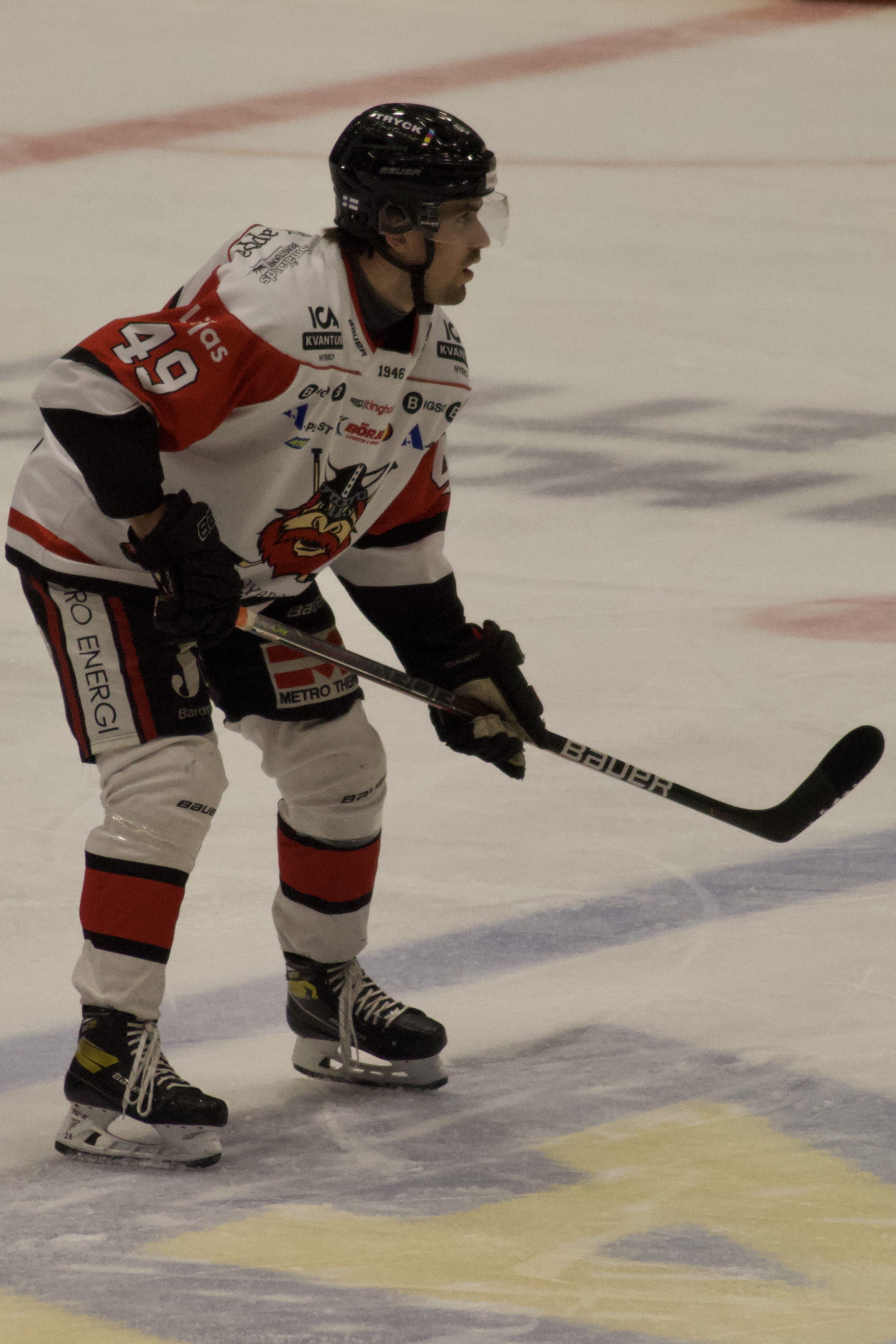
- Born: 30 November 1992 (age 32); Tampere, Finland
- Height: 5 ft 11 in (180 cm)
- Weight: 182 lb (83 kg; 13 st 0 lb)
- Position: Defense
- Shoots: Left
- Hockeyettan team Former teams: Nybro IF; Ilves; LeKi; KooKoo; Peliitat Heinola; Hudiksvalls HC; Pyry; KOOVEE; HC Nové Zámky
- NHL draft: Undrafted
- Playing career: 2011–present

Markus Västilä (born 30 November 1992) is a Finnish professional ice hockey player. He is currently playing for Nybro IF of the Hockeyettan.

Markus Västilä made his Liiga debut playing with Ilves during the 2011–12 Liiga season

== Career statistics ==
=== Regular season and playoffs ===
			Regular season					Playoffs
Season	Team	League	GP	G	A	Pts	PIM	GP	G	A	Pts	PIM
