= Janne Seppänen =

Finnish ice hockey player

- Born: May 15, 1995 (age 29); Porvoo, Finland
- Height: 5 ft 9 in (175 cm)
- Weight: 170 lb (77 kg; 12 st 2 lb)
- Position: Forward
- Shoots: Right
- Mestis team Former teams: KOOVEE; Kiekko-Vantaa; Ilves; LeKi; Heinolan Peliitat; HC Nové Zámky
- Playing career: 2016–present

Janne Seppänen (born May 15, 1995) is a Finnish professional ice hockey forward currently playing for KOOVEE of the Mestis.

Seppänen was a member of Ilves's academy from 2014 to 2016 before spending the 2016–17 season on loan with LeKi in Mestis. On April 26, 2017, he joined Peliitat on a permanent transfer but returned to LeKi two months later. On June 3, 2019, Seppänen signed for KOOVEE. On December 28, he was loaned to Ilves, with whom he played two games.

On August 8, 2020, Seppänen moved to Slovakia to sign for HC Nové Zámky of the Tipos Extraliga.

== Career statistics ==
=== Regular season and playoffs ===
			Regular season					Playoffs
Season	Team	League	GP	G	A	Pts	PIM	GP	G	A	Pts	PIM
