= Dominik Kramár =

Slovak ice hockey defenceman

- Born: 6 September 1988 (age 37) Poprad, Czechoslovakia
- Height: 6 ft 0 in (183 cm)
- Weight: 190 lb (86 kg; 13 st 8 lb)
- Position: Defence
- Shot: Left
- team Former teams: Retired; HK Trebišov; HC Košice; SK Kadaň; HC Klášterec nad Ohří; HK Poprad; MHK Kežmarok; HC 46 Bardejov; Ferencvárosi TC; Rapaces de Gap; Lions de Lyon; Boxers de Bordeaux; Brûleurs de Loups; MHk 32 Liptovský Mikuláš
- Playing career: 2007–2021

Dominik Kramár (born 6 September 1988) is a Slovak former professional ice hockey defenceman.

== Career ==
Kramár played in junior level for HK Poprad, HK 31 Kežmarok and HC Košice between 2003 and 2008. He also had two loan spells with Slovak 1. Liga side HK Trebisov and also played one game for HC Košice's senior team during the 2007–08 season. Kramár then spent the 2008–09 season in the Czech Republic, playing in the Czech 1. Liga for SK Kadaň.

In 2009, Kramár returned to his hometown team HK Poprad and spent the next four seasons with the team before moving to HC 46 Bardejov of the Slovak 1. Liga. In 2014, he joined Ferencvárosi TC of the MOL Liga, playing sixteen games before finishing the season with Rapaces de Gap in the French Ligue Magnus.

In June 2016, Kramár joined fellow Ligue Magnus team Lions de Lyon. He joined Boxers de Bordeaux in 2017 and later played for Brûleurs de Loups, with whom he won the 2018–19 national championship. After the 2018–19 season, he returned to Slovakia, signing for Poprad alongside teammates Guillaume Leclerc and Aleksandar Magovac.
