= Roman Petrík =

Slovak ice hockey goaltender

- Born: 29 July 1994 (age 30); Zvolen, Slovakia
- Height: 6 ft 1 in (185 cm)
- Weight: 174 lb (79 kg; 12 st 6 lb)
- Position: Goaltender
- Catches: Left
- Slovak team Former teams: HKM Zvolen; HK 36 Skalica; HKM Rimavská Sobota; HC 07 Detva; HC 21 Prešov
- Playing career: 2015–present

Roman Petrík (born 29 July 1994) is a Slovak professional ice hockey goaltender for HKM Zvolen of the Slovak Extraliga.

Petrík made his professional debut for HKM Zvolen during the 2014–15 season. He played 13 games for Zvolen before moving to HK 36 Skalica of the Slovak 1. Liga during the 2016–17 season. On April 18, 2018, Petrík returned to the Tipsport Liga and signed with HC 07 Detva. On February 18, 2020, Petrík returned to HKM Zvolen for the remainder of the 2019–20 season. which would eventually be curtailed prematurely due to the COVID-19 pandemic.

== Career statistics ==
=== Regular season and playoffs ===
			Regular season										Playoffs
Season	Team	League	GP	W	L	T	OTL	MIN	GA	SO	GAA	SV%	GP	W	L	MIN	GA	SO	GAA	SV%
