= Patrik Maier =

Slovak ice hockey player

- Born: 6 November 1996 (age 29) Bratislava, Slovakia
- Height: 6 ft 0 in (183 cm)
- Weight: 192 lb (87 kg; 13 st 10 lb)
- Position: Defence
- Shoots: Left
- Slovak team Former teams: HC Slovan Bratislava; HC Nové Zámky; HC Bílí Tygři Liberec; HKM Zvolen; HC '05 Banská Bystrica
- National team: Slovakia
- Playing career: 2013–present

Patrik Maier (born 6 November 1996) is a Slovak professional ice hockey defenceman for HC Slovan Bratislava of the Tipos Extraliga.

== Career ==
Maier was a member of Slovan Bratislava's academy and also played two seasons in Western Hockey League, playing for the Kamloops Blazers, who drafted him 6th overall in the 2014 CHL Import Draft and the Moose Jaw Warriors. On May 31, 2016, Maier returned to Slovakia and signed for HC Nové Zámky of the Tipsport Liga.

On July 20, 2017, Maier moved to the Czech Extraliga and signed for HC Bílí Tygři Liberec and played 34 games over two seasons. He returned to Slovakia on June 5, 2019, signing for HKM Zvolen. He would leave the team by February however and join HC '05 Banská Bystrica. On July 24, 2020, Maier returned to Slovan Bratislava.

In 2022, Maier won the Slovak Extraliga with HC Slovan Bratislava.

== Career statistics ==
=== Regular season and playoffs ===
| | | | Regular season | | | | | Playoffs |
| Season | Team | League | GP | G | A | Pts | PIM | GP | G | A | Pts | PIM |

=== International ===
| Year | Team | Event | Result | GP | G | A | Pts | PIM |
|---|---|---|---|---|---|---|---|---|
| 2013 | Slovakia | WHC17 | 10th | 5 | 0 | 0 | 0 | 4 |
| 2014 | Slovakia | WJC18 | 8th | 5 | 1 | 0 | 1 | 8 |
| 2016 | Slovakia | WJC | 7th | 5 | 1 | 0 | 1 | 0 |
| Junior totals | | | | 15 | 2 | 0 | 2 | 12 |

== Awards and honors ==
| Award | Year |
Slovak
| Champion | 2022 |
