= Michal Chovan =

Slovak professional ice hockey player

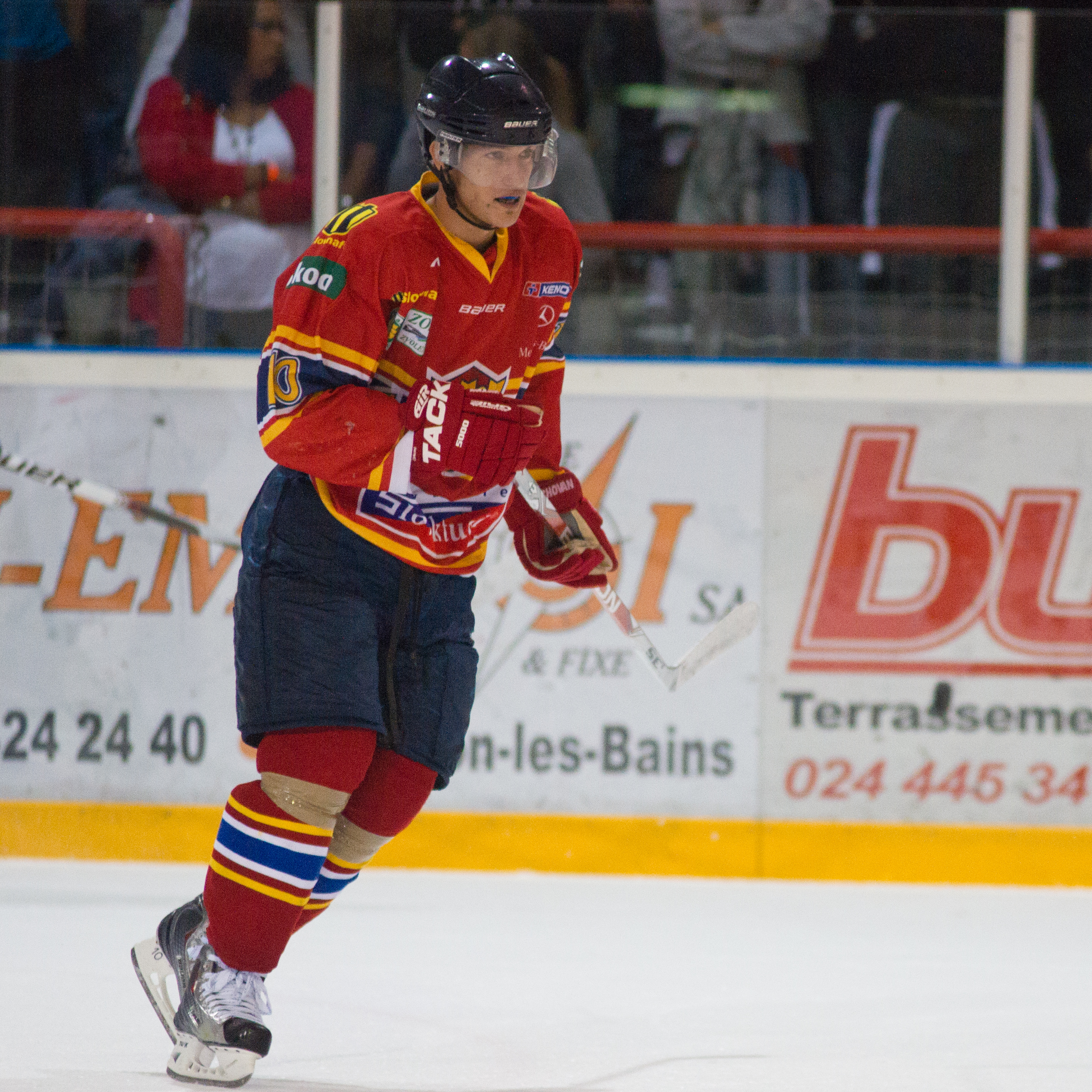
- Born: November 23, 1987 (age 38) Zvolen, Czechoslovakia
- Height: 6 ft 0 in (183 cm)
- Weight: 163 lb (74 kg; 11 st 9 lb)
- Position: Right wing
- Shoots: Left
- Slovak team Former teams: HC Košice; HKM Zvolen; HC 07 Detva; HC Oceláři Třinec; Mountfield HK; HK Poprad; HC Neman Grodno; Motor České Budějovice
- NHL draft: Undrafted
- Playing career: 2006–present

Michal Chovan (born November 23, 1987) is a Slovak professional ice hockey player who is currently playing for HC Košice of the Slovak Extraliga.

== Career ==
Chovan grew up in Zvolen, playing minor and junior ice hockey for the local club. He was never drafted. He made his Extraliga debut in the 2005–06 season. He was scoring leader of HKm in 2010–11 season, earning 41 points in 49 games.

== Career statistics ==
=== Regular season and playoffs ===
Bold indicates led league

			Regular season					Playoffs
Season	Team	League	GP	G	A	Pts	PIM	GP	G	A	Pts	PIM
2004–05	HKM Zvolen	Slovak-Jr.	2	0	0	0	0	—	—	—	—	—
2005–06	HKM Zvolen	Slovak-Jr.	43	20	17	37	63	2	0	2	2	4
2005–06	HKM Zvolen	Slovak	7	0	2	2	0	—	—	—	—	—
2006–07	HKM Zvolen	Slovak-Jr.	19	9	10	19	42	—	—	—	—	—
2006–07	HKM Zvolen	Slovak	16	0	2	2	14	8	0	0	0	0
2006–07	HC 07 Detva	Slovak.1	4	0	1	1	18	—	—	—	—	—
2007–08	HKM Zvolen	Slovak-Jr.	25	16	28	44	62	—	—	—	—	—
2007–08	HKM Zvolen	Slovak	44	1	2	3	6	—	—	—	—	—
2008–09	HKM Zvolen	Slovak	53	18	26	44	86	12	4	9	13	10
2009–10	HKM Zvolen	Slovak	38	13	19	32	34	5	1	2	3	2
2010–11	HKM Zvolen	Slovak	49	12	29	41	26	7	1	4	5	8
2011–12	HC Oceláři Třinec	Czech	20	0	4	4	8	—	—	—	—	—
2011–12	HC VCES Hradec Králové	Czech.1	3	1	1	2	0	—	—	—	—	—
2011–12	HK Poprad	Slovak	15	6	9	15	4	—	—	—	—	—
2012–13	HKM Zvolen	Slovak	41	14	43	57	62	17	1	6	7	12
2013–14	HKM Zvolen	Slovak	44	19	19	38	73	3	0	0	0	55
2014–15	HKM Zvolen	Slovak	43	13	31	44	32	7	4	3	7	6
2015–16	HC Neman Grodno	BHL	9	0	3	3	6	—	—	—	—	—
2015–16	Motor České Budějovice	Czech.1	31	7	15	22	10	9	2	5	7	4
2016–17	Motor České Budějovice	Czech.1	40	15	17	32	28	5	4	3	7	2
2017–18	HKM Zvolen	Slovak	34	12	23	35	12	12	1	9	10	2
2018–19	HKM Zvolen	Slovak	56	20	**48**	68	34	12	0	10	10	2
2019–20	HC Košice	Slovak	44	15	33	48	20	—	—	—	—	—
2020–21	HC Košice	Slovak	45	12	**44**	56	22	4	0	0	0	26
2021–22	HC Košice	Slovak	49	14	31	45	24	13	1	7	8	4
2022–23	HC Košice	Slovak	39	12	28	40	8	17	3	4	7	14
Czech totals			20	0	4	4	8	—	—	—	—	—
Slovak totals			617	181	389	570	457	117	16	54	70	141

== Awards and honors ==
Award	Year
Slovak
Champion	2013, 2023
