= Matej Kristín =

Slovak ice hockey player

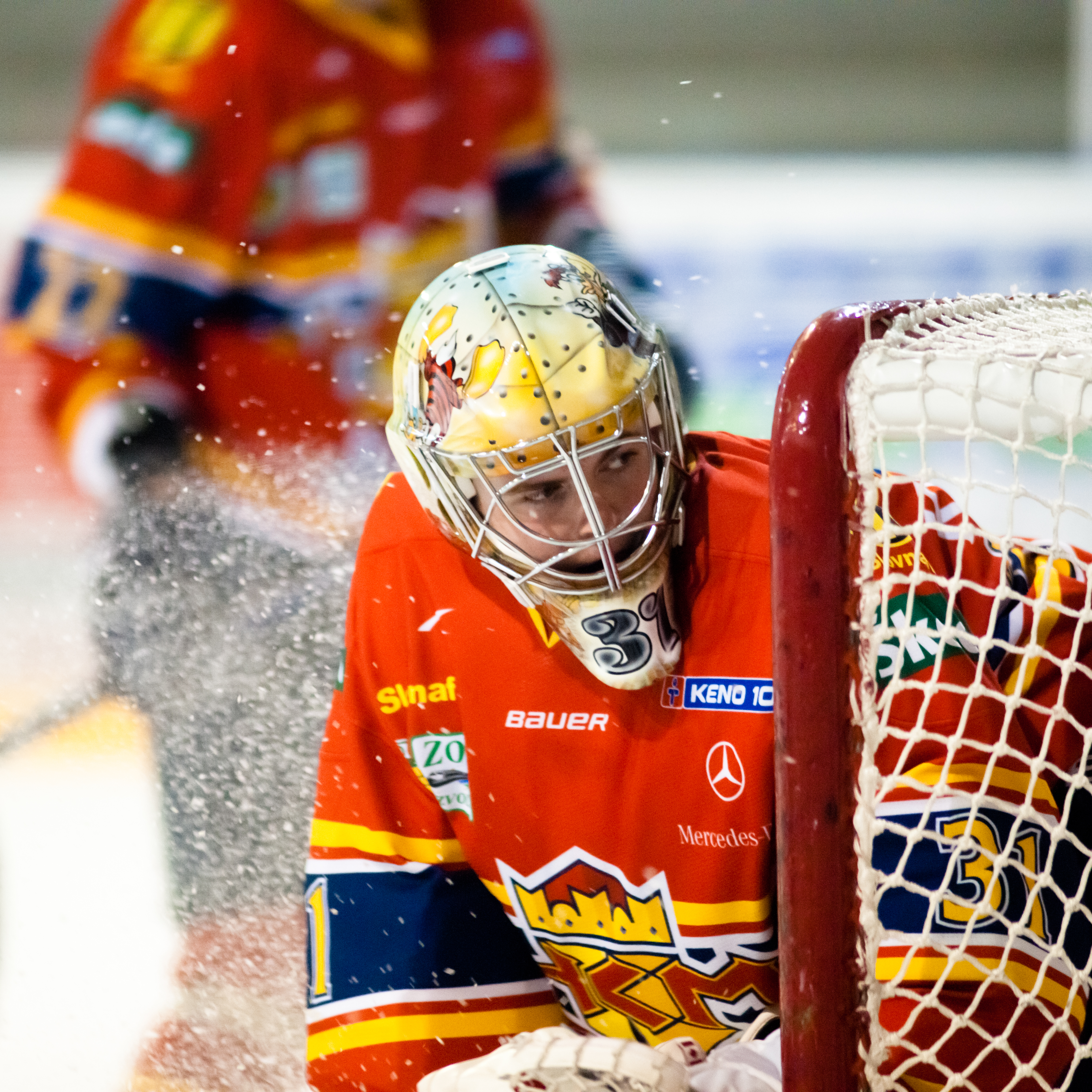
- Matej Kristin as goalie for HKm Zvolen
- Born: January 24, 1990 (age 35) Ilava, Czechoslovakia
- Height: 5 ft 11 in (180 cm)
- Weight: 185 lb (84 kg; 13 st 3 lb)
- Position: Goaltender
- Catches: Left
- Slovak 1. Liga team Former teams: HK Spartak Dubnica nad Váhom; HKM Zvolen; Lions de Lyon; HC Nové Zámky; HK Poprad; HK Dukla Trenčín
- Playing career: 2008–present

Matej Kristín (born January 24, 1990) is a Slovak professional ice hockey goaltender who is currently playing for HK Spartak Dubnica nad Váhom in the Slovak 1. Liga.

== Career ==
Kristín began his career with HKM Zvolen, where he played from 2007 to 2011. On May 29, 2011, Kristín joined HC Dukla Senica on the Slovak 1. Liga as their starting goaltender. The following year, he returned to the Tipsport Liga with HK Dukla Trenčín. He then moved to France on April 25, 2014, to sign for LHC Les Lions of the FFHG Division 1. As their starting goaltender, he helped the team earn promotion to the Ligue Magnus that season and was re-signed for the following year. However, he would lose his starting goaltender role to Landry Macrez.

In 2015, Kristín returned to Slovakia and signed with HC Nové Zámky of the 1. Liga, winning the league championship. The following year, he went back to the French Division 1 and signed for Diables Rouges de Briançon on May 17, 2016. On April 14, 2017, he moved to fellow Division 1 team Remparts de Tours.

Kristín then moved to the Czech Republic to sign for Draci Šumperk of the 2nd Czech Republic Hockey League on June 19, 2018. He played thirteen games for the team before returning to Nové Zámky during the season. He re-signed with the team on May 23, 2019, but left during the season and joined HK Poprad on January 23, 2020. On July 5, 2020, Kristín re-joined HK Dukla Trenčín seven years after his previous stint with the team.

Kristín was a member of the Slovak national team for the 2008 IIHF World U18 Championships.
