= Michal Valent =

- Born: 5 March 1986 (age 40) Martin, Czechoslovakia
- Height: 6 ft 2 in (188 cm)
- Weight: 198 lb (90 kg; 14 st 2 lb)
- Position: Goaltender
- Catches: Left
- Slovak 1. Liga team Former teams: Vlci Žilina; NED Hockey Nymburk; HC Berounští Medvědi; SK Horácká Slavia Třebíč; HC Sparta Praha; HC Havířov Panthers; BK Mladá Boleslav; HC Vrchlabí; HC Most; HK Nitra; HK Dukla Trenčín; MHk 32 Liptovský Mikuláš
- NHL draft: 145th overall, 2004; Buffalo Sabres
- Playing career: 2009–present

Michal Valent (born 5 March 1986) is a Slovak professional ice hockey goaltender who plays for Dukla Trenčín of the Slovak Extraliga.

He was selected by the Buffalo Sabres in the 5th round (145th overall) of the 2004 NHL entry draft. Valent played for BK Mladá Boleslav from the 2010–11 Czech Extraliga season until October 2014. He had previously played for HC Sparta Prague.

== Career ==
After joining Mladá Boleslav he spent much of the first two seasons as back-up to local-born goalie Marek Schwarz. Schwarz then left the club and Jaroslav Hübl came in to take his place. Valent, therefore, remained second choice for the majority of the 2010–11 season. At the end of that season the club was relegated to the Czech První Liga, the second highest Czech league, in 2012 he remained with the club and was initially set to form a partnership with new signing Vlastimil Lakosil, but junior goaltender Roman Will was given a place in the team when he unexpectedly returned from Canada, leaving Valent's position uncertain. For that reason he was loaned out to other teams including HK Nitra in his native Slovakia. Lakosil failed to impress, but youngster Will proved extremely capable and secured the number one spot. When Will was unable to play due to illness, Valent was recalled from Nitra early. He subsequently built a solid position in the club and the Will-Valent partnership excelled. Lakosil would eventually leave the club to play in Kazakhstan. By the time the club won promotion back into the Extraliga at the end of the 2013–14 season, Valent had cemented his place as the team's first choice goaltender and signed a contract with the club for the following season.

With Will heading to the US at the beginning of the 2014–15 season however, newcomer David Rittich was handed the reins as the team's number one goal tender leaving Valent once again as back-up. He made two starts earning an 0–1–1 record, as well as twice coming in to replace Rittich part way through a game in the first 12 games of the season. In early October the club signed veteran goalie Roman Málek on loan from HC Vítkovice Steel until the end of the season, leading to speculation that there may have been some tension between Valent and Rittich, or that Valent was clearly unhappy as number two behind the rookie, though there has not been any clear evidence of this. Málek's arrival, however, further complicated the goal-tending situation and it was unlikely that the three could all get a chance to play. Finally, on 16 October 2014, it was announced that Valent would shortly be leaving the club and returning to his native Slovakia to join HK Nitra, one of the clubs he represented while on loan from Mladá Boleslav in the 2012–13 season. In the 2014–15 season Nitra reached the play-off semi-finals and during the off-season Valent signed a contract to remain at the club for another season.

On 19 December 2015, Valent made his debut for the Slovak national team at the Arosa Challenge in Switzerland. Facing the home team, Slovakia eventually succumbed by a score of 3–2 after a shootout.

On 22 April 2016, Valent's current team HK Nitra became champion of the Slovak Extraliga, beating Banská Bystrica in six games.

== Awards and honors ==
Award	Year
Slovak Extraliga
Champion	2016
