= Samuel Petráš (ice hockey) =

Slovak ice hockey player (born 1995)

- Born: 11 May 1995 (age 31) Bratislava, Slovakia
- Height: 6 ft 2 in (188 cm)
- Weight: 185 lb (84 kg; 13 st 3 lb)
- Position: Forward
- Shoots: Left
- Slovak team Former teams: HC Slovan Bratislava; HK Orange 20; ŠHK 37 Piešťany; HKM Zvolen; Sokol Krasnoyarsk; MHk 32 Liptovský Mikuláš; HK Poprad
- Playing career: 2014–present
Medal record
Representing Slovakia
Ice hockey
IIHF World U20 Championship
Bronze medal – third place	2015 Canada

Samuel Petráš (born 11 May 1995) is a Slovak professional ice hockey forward who currently playing for HC Slovan Bratislava of the Slovak Extraliga.

== Career ==
Petráš was an academy player with Slovan Bratislava and made his senior debut for the team during the 2015–16 KHL season. He played 24 games in the KHL for the club and was also a member of ŠHK 37 Piešťany and HKM Zvolen.

Petráš spent a season in the Supreme Hockey League for Sokol Krasnoyarsk before returning to HKM Zvolen on a permanent transfer on June 13, 2018. On July 24, 2020, Petráš rejoined Slovan Bratislava on a one-year contract.

== Career statistics ==
=== Regular season and playoffs ===
			Regular season					Playoffs
Season	Team	League	GP	G	A	Pts	PIM	GP	G	A	Pts	PIM

=== International ===
Year	Team	Event	Result	GP	G	A	Pts	PIM
2013	Slovakia	WJC18	9th	6	0	1	1	6
2015	Slovakia	WJC	3rd place, bronze medalist(s)	7	0	0	0	2
Junior totals				13	0	1	1	8
