= Michal Novák (ice hockey) =

Slovak ice hockey player

- Born: May 18, 1982 (age 42); Skalica, Czechoslovakia
- Height: 6 ft 4 in (193 cm)
- Weight: 225 lb (102 kg; 16 st 1 lb)
- Position: Defenceman
- Shoots: Right
- Slovak Extraliga team Former teams: HC Košice; HK Nitra (Svk-1); HC Vítkovice (Cze-1); HC Havířov (Cze-2); Trois-Rivières Caron & Guay (LNAH); Thetford Mines Isothermic (LNAH); Mörrum GoIS IK (Swe-3); HC Dukla Senica (Svk-2); HK 36 Skalica (Svk-1)
- NHL draft: Undrafted
- Playing career: 2001–present

Michal Novák (born May 18, 1982) is a Slovak ice hockey defenceman playing for the HC Košice in the Slovak Extraliga.
