= Martin Ice Stadium =

Ice sports venue in Martin, Slovakia

Coordinates: 49°04′28″N 18°54′45″E

Zimný štadion Martin is an indoor arena in Martin, Slovakia. It is primarily used for ice hockey local club HK Martin. Arena has a capacity of 4,200 people and was constructed in 1977. In 2004 Martin hosted 3rd WORLD JUNIOR CHAMPIONSHIP STREET & BALL HOCKEY, all matches were played in this arena.

== Notable events ==
An overview of some sport events:

2004

- 2004 ISBHF U20 Junior World Championships
