= Ilkka Mesikämmen =

Finnish ice hockey player (1943–2025)

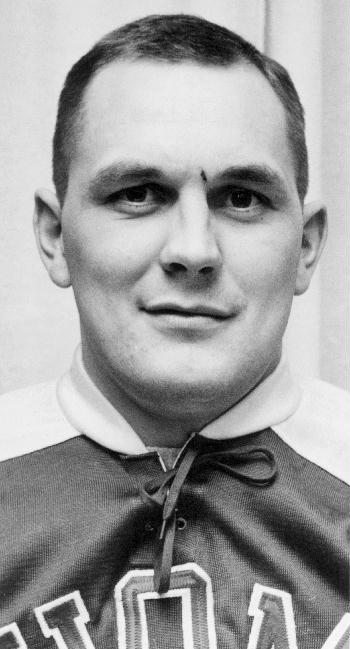
Mesikämmen in the 1960s

Ilkka Tapani Mesikämmen (15 March 1943 – 13 July 2025) was a Finnish professional ice hockey player in the SM-liiga. He played for Ässät and TPS. Mesikämmen competed in the men's tournament at the 1964 Winter Olympics. He was inducted into the Finnish Hockey Hall of Fame in 1988. Mesikämmen was born in Turku, Finland on 15 March 1943, and died on 13 July 2025, at the age of 82.
