= HK Dukla Trenčín =

Ice hockey team

- Nickname: Vojaci
- City: Trenčín, Slovakia
- League: Slovak Extraliga
- Founded: 1962
- Home arena: Pavol Demitra Ice Stadium (capacity 6,300)
- Colours: Yellow, red
- Head coach: Todd Björkstrand
- Captain: Tomáš Starosta
- Website: www.hkdukla.sk

Hokejový Klub Dukla Trenčín is a professional Slovak ice hockey club based in Trenčín, playing in the Slovak Extraliga. The club has won three Slovak league championships (1994, 1997, 2004) and one Czechoslovak league championship (1992). The team is nicknamed Vojaci, meaning "Soldiers" in English.

== History ==
=== Czechoslovak era ===
The club was founded on 19 January 1962, relocating the army hockey club from Opava to Trenčín. They were members of inaugural season (1963–64) of the 1. SNHL (1st Slovak National Hockey League). They won the 1965–66 1. SNHL season and promoted to the preliminary round for the Czechoslovak First Ice Hockey League. There they lost 5 of 6 games against VŽKG Ostrava, VTŽ Chomutov and Spartak Motorlet Praha and did not promote to the First League. Dukla won the 1. SNHL again in 1967–68, 1970–71 and 1976–77. In 1976–77 they were first time successful in the preliminary round and first time in the club's history they promoted to the Czechoslovak First Ice Hockey League. Dukla was placed 11th in their first season at the Top level. After five seasons, they were relegated from the Top level in the 1981–82 season. However, in the next season they won 1. SNHL and in the preliminary round defeated Olomouc and promoted to the Top level again. They were placed 6th after their comeback in the 1983–84 season. In 1985–86 there was introduced playoffs tournament in the Czechoslovak Extraliga. Dukla advanced to the playoffs in 1985–86 and there they lost 1–3 against Tesla Pardubice in the quarterfinals. They advanced to the playoffs again in 1987–88, before losing 1–3 in the quarterfinals to their Slovak rival VSŽ Košice. Dukla progressed to the finals against Tesla Pardubice in the 1988–89 season. There they lost 1–3. In the next season they progressed to the finals again where they lost 1–3 against HC Sparta Praha. In 1990–91 Dukla lost in the semifinals against Litvínov but they won the bronze medals against VSŽ Košice. The most successful season in the club history is the 1991–92 season when Dukla won the Czechoslovak Extraliga first time. In the quarterfinals they defeated Poldi Kladno 3–2, in the semifinals defeated Litvínov 3–1 and in the finals they won 3–1 against Škoda Plzeň. Žigmund Pálffy was scoring leader of Dukla in the regular season (48 Pts) and in the playoffs (26 Pts). Róbert Švehla, defenceman of Dukla, won the Golden Hockey Stick in the same season. In the last season before split Czechoslovakia Dukla won the bronze medals.

=== Slovak era ===
After dissolution of Czechoslovakia in 1993, Dukla began playing independent new Slovak Championship which was named the Slovak Extraliga. Dukla and HC Košice were playoffs finalists in first 4 seasons of the Slovak Extraliga. Dukla won the first Extraliga season in 1993–94, then they lost in the finals in two next seasons and won again in 1996–97. In the 1997–98 season Dukla was eliminated in the semifinals by HC Slovan Bratislava. In the 2000–01 season they played again in the playoffs finals. There they lost 1–3 against HKm Zvolen. Zvolen was opponent in the playoffs finals again in the 2003–04 season. Dukla won 4–2 in the finals and they won third Slovak title in their history. During the 2004–05 NHL lockout several former Dukla players came back to Trenčín, including Pavol Demitra, Marián Hossa and Marián Gáborík. Pavol Demitra played complete regular season and he was a scoring leader of the Extraliga (82 Pts). Despite a star lineup Dukla lost 3–4 in the excited semifinals against HC Slovan Bratislava. In the 2006–07 season Dukla played in the final series against HC Slovan Bratislava but lost 0–4. In the 2009–10 season Dukla did not qualify for the playoffs for the first time since the 1986–87 season.

== NHL alumni ==
After the fall of the Iron Curtain many players who were born in Trenčín or started their youth career in Dukla youth system had success in the NHL. Marián Gáborík, Marián Hossa and Zdeno Chára are the most successful players who were born in Trenčín. Gáborík was drafted 3rd overall by Minnesota Wild in the 2000 NHL entry draft, becoming the first signed player in the club history. Gáborík's teammate in Minnesota Wild was Ľubomír Sekeráš who played three seasons for the club. Chára, drafted 56th overall by New York Islanders in 1996, is the first Slovak and only the second European captain of an NHL team who won the Stanley Cup. Chára is also the first Slovak winner of the James Norris Memorial Trophy, given to the best defenseman of a season. Richard Lintner was drafted in the same year as Chára, another NHL player who was born in Trenčín. Marián Hossa won Stanley Cup three times with Chicago Blackhawks. The stadium in Trenčín was named after Pavol Demitra who died in the 2011 Lokomotiv Yaroslavl plane crash.

== Honours ==
=== Domestic ===
Slovak Extraliga

- (gold) Winners (3): 1993–94, 1996–97, 2003–04
- (silver) Runners-up (5): 1994–95, 1995–96, 2000–01, 2006–07, 2017–18
- (bronze) 3rd place (3): 1999–2000, 2004–05, 2011–12

Czechoslovak Extraliga

- (gold) Winners (1): 1991–92
- (silver) Runners-up (2): 1988–89, 1989–90
- (bronze) 3rd place (2): 1990–91, 1992–93

1st. Slovak National Hockey League

- (gold) Winners (5): 1965–66, 1967–68, 1970–71, 1976–77, 1982–83
- (silver) Runners-up (3): 1964–65, 1971–72, 1974–75
- (bronze) 3rd place (3): 1963–64, 1966–67, 1969–70

=== Pre-season ===
Rona Cup

- (gold) Winners (4): 1994, 2002, 2003, 2007

Tatra Cup

- (gold) Winners (2): 1985, 1996

== Players ==
=== Current roster ===
As of 9 December 2024.

No.	Nat	Player	Pos	S/G	Age	Acquired	Birthplace
61	(Sweden)	Filip Ahl (A)	LW	L	28	2023	Jönköping, Sweden
93	(Slovakia)	Juraj Bezúch	C	L	32	2024	Skalica, Slovakia
77	(Slovakia)	Tomáš Bokroš	D	R	36	2023	Trenčín, Czechoslovakia
72	(Slovakia)	Dávid Borák	G	L	24	2022	Trstená, Slovakia
29	(Slovakia)	Dalibor Bortňák	C	L	34	2024	Prešov, Czechoslovakia
53	(Canada)	Jake Cardwell	D	R	33	2024	Niagara Falls, Ontario, Canada
88	(Slovakia)	František Dej	C	L	20	2024	Bratislava, Slovakia
9	(United States)	Gordie Green	RW	R	28	2024	Ann Arbor, Michigan, United States
30	(Latvia)	Gustavs Grigals	G	L	27	2024	Riga, Latvia
33	(Slovakia)	Andrej Hatala	D	R	28	2024	Trenčín, Slovakia
74	(Slovakia)	Matúš Hlaváč	D	L	24	2022	Trenčín, Slovakia
35	(Slovakia)	Denis Hudec	RW	L	32	2021	Trenčín, Slovakia
72	(Canada)	Sean Josling	RW	R	26	2024	Toronto, Ontario, Canada
23	(Slovakia)	Samuel Krajč	RW	R	24	2024	Martin, Slovakia
14	(Slovakia)	Andrej Krajčovič	F	L	23	2020	Trenčín, Slovakia
79	(Slovakia)	Michal Laurencik	D	L	22	2024	Skalica, Slovakia
15	(Finland)	Ville Leskinen	LW	L	30	2024	Pieksämäki, Finland
27	(Slovakia)	Miroslav Macejko	D	L	33	2024	Košice, Czechoslovakia
93	(Slovakia)	Bruno Mráz	C	R	32	2024	Bratislava, Slovakia
25	(Canada)	Quinn Schmiemann	D	L	24	2024	Wilcox, Saskatchewan, Canada
98	(Slovakia)	Peter Sojčík	RW	L	39	2021	Dubnica nad Váhom, Czechoslovakia
7	(Canada)	Brett Stapley	C	R	26	2024	Campbell River, British Columbia, Canada
19	(Slovakia)	Tomáš Starosta (A)	D	L	44	2017	Trenčín, Czechoslovakia
17	(Slovakia)	Adam Stránský	C	L	23	2024	Trenčín, Slovakia
13	(Slovakia)	Tobias Tomík	C	L	18	2024	Ilava, Slovakia
31	(Slovakia)	Michal Valent	G	L	39	2024	Martin, Czechoslovakia
67	(Slovakia)	Tomáš Záborský (C)	LW	L	38	2024	Trenčín, Czechoslovakia

=== Retired numbers ===
HK Dukla Trenčín retired numbers
No.	Player	Position	Career	No. retirement
38	Pavol Demitra	Center	1992–1993, 2004–2005	September 16, 2011
10	Oto Haščák	Center	1982–1989, 1995–1996, 1998–2001	September 28, 2014

== Notable players ==
- Jerguš Bača
- Josef Beránek
- Ernest Bokroš
- Mojmír Božík
- Zdeno Chára
- Zdeno Cíger
- Jozef Daňo
- Pavol Demitra
- Marián Gáborík
- Leo Gudas
- Eduard Hartmann
- Oto Haščák
- Radoslav Hecl
- Ivan Hlinka
- Miroslav Hlinka
- Miloš Holaň
- Marián Hossa
- Marcel Hossa
- Jiří Hrdina
- Branislav Jánoš
- Tomáš Jelínek
- Tomáš Kapusta
- Ľubomír Kolník
- Roman Kontšek
- Tomáš Kopecký
- Ján Lašák
- Richard Lintner
- Tomáš Lovásik
- Miroslav Marcinko
- Stanislav Medřík
- Andrej Meszároš
- Branislav Mezei
- Michel Miklík
- Igor Murín
- Milan Nedoma
- Andrej Nedorost
- Žigmund Pálffy
- Ján Pardavý
- Rastislav Pavlikovský
- Róbert Petrovický
- Branko Radivojevič
- Radim Raděvič
- Pavel Richter
- Vladimír Růžička
- Miroslav Šatan
- Andrej Sekera
- Ľubomír Sekeráš
- Peter Slanina
- Marián Smerčiak
- Roman Stantien
- Tomáš Starosta
- Antonín Stavjaňa
- Jozef Stümpel
- Roman Šimíček
- Róbert Švehla
- Tomáš Tatar

Preceded by HC Dukla Jihlava	Czechoslovak Extraliga; Champions; 1991–92	Succeeded by HC Sparta Praha
Preceded by (none)	Slovak Extraliga; Champions; 1993–94	Succeeded by HC Košice
Preceded by HC Košice	Slovak Extraliga; Champions; 1996–97	Succeeded by HC Slovan Bratislava
Preceded by HC Slovan Bratislava	Slovak Extraliga; Champions; 2003–04	Succeeded by HC Slovan Bratislava
