= HK Dukla Michalovce =

- Nickname: Líšky (Foxes)
- City: Michalovce, Slovakia
- League: Slovak Extraliga
- Founded: 1974
- Home arena: Michalovce Ice Stadium (capacity 3,800)
- Colours: Orange, black, white
- Owners: (Michal Stanko, chairman)
- Head coach: Martin Hrnčár
- Website: hkduklamichalovce.sk

HK Dukla Michalovce is a professional ice hockey team playing in the Slovak Extraliga, the top level of ice hockey in the country. They play in the city of Michalovce, Slovakia at Michalovce Ice Stadium. The team is nicknamed Líšky, which means Foxes in English.

== History ==
The club was founded in 1974. In the 2017–18 season won first time title in second league Slovak 1. Liga. Next season they won again. In the Relegation series they played with MsHK Žilina, the 12th team in 2018–19 Slovak Extraliga season. The winner of best-of-seven series played in Extraliga in 2019–20 season. Michalovce won the series 4–3 and played in 2019–20 Slovak Extraliga season, first time in club history.

== Honours ==
=== Domestic ===
Slovak Extraliga

- (bronze) 3rd place (2): 2020–21, 2023–24

Slovak 1. Liga

- (gold) Winners (2): 2017–18, 2018–19
- (silver) Runners-up (2): 2012–13, 2013–14

1st. Slovak National Hockey League

- (gold) Winners (1): 1985–86

== Players ==
=== Current roster ===
As of 16 November 2024.

No.	Nat	Player	Pos	S/G	Age	Acquired	Birthplace
19	(Slovakia)	Ján Brejčák	D	L	37	2024	Poprad, Czechoslovakia
61	(Latvia)	Kaspars Daugaviņš (C)	LW	L	38	2023	Riga, Latvian SSR, Soviet Union
23	(Slovakia)	Adam Drgoň (A)	D	R	41	2023	Trnava, Czechoslovakia
88	(Slovakia)	Daniil Fominykh	C	L	28	2024	Ufa, Russia
20	(Slovakia)	Patrik Gabriel	C	L	22	2024	Trnava, Slovakia
35	(Slovakia)	Vladimír Glosár	G	L	28	2023	Michalovce, Slovakia
88	(Slovakia)	Sebastian Jasečko	D	R	23	2023	České Budějovice, Czech Republic
33	(France)	Julian Junca	G	L	28	2024	Prades, France
12	(United States)	Ben Johnson	C	L	32	2024	Calumet, Michigan, United States
71	(Slovakia)	Michal Kabáč (A)	C	L	30	2023	Trstená, Slovakia
32	(Latvia)	Artūrs Kulda	D	L	38	2024	Leipzig, East Germany
85	(Slovakia)	Ján Marcinko	D	R	24	2024	Košice, Slovakia
44	(Slovakia)	Jakub Melisko	D	L	30	2024	Žiar nad Hronom, Slovakia
2	(Czech Republic)	Albert Michnáč	LW	L	28	2024	Prague, Czech Republic
3	(Slovakia)	Milan Pišoja	D	L	21	2022	Považská Bystrica, Slovakia
91	(Canada)	Adam Rockwood	C	L	31	2024	Coquitlam, British Columbia, Canada
77	(Finland)	Topi Rönni	C	L	22	2024	Hausjärvi, Finland
26	(Czech Republic)	Ondřej Slováček	D	L	32	2024	Vsetín, Czech Republic
69	(Slovakia)	Samuel Solenský (A)	RW	L	28	2023	Michalovce, Slovakia
55	(Slovakia)	Adam Stripai	D	L	24	2020	Michalovce, Slovakia
71	(Slovakia)	Patrik Svitana (A)	RW	R	38	2024	Poprad, Czechoslovakia
22	(Slovakia)	Marek Valach	RW	L	28	2023	Ilava, Slovakia
67	(Slovakia)	Adam Varga	RW	R	25	2023	Bel Air, Maryland, United States
7	(Slovakia)	Filip Vašaš	RW	R	28	2022	Stará Ľubovňa, Slovakia
