= 2016–17 Slovak Extraliga season =

- League: Slovak Extraliga
- Sport: Ice hockey
- Duration: September 2016 – April 2017

Regular season
- League Champion: HC ’05 Banská Bystrica
- Runners-up: HK Nitra
- Top scorer: Ladislav Nagy (Košice)

Playoffs
- Playoffs MVP: Mathieu Corbeil (Martin)
- Finals champions: HC ’05 Banská Bystrica
- Runners-up: HK Nitra

Slovak Extraliga seasons
- 2015–16 2017–18

The 2016–17 Slovak Extraliga season was the 24th season of the Slovak Extraliga, the highest level of ice hockey in Slovakia.

== Teams ==
The following teams are participating in the 2016–17 season. The HK Orange 20 is a project for preparation of the Slovakia junior ice hockey team for the IIHF World U20 Championship. The team do not play complete regular season and cannot promote to the playoffs or get relegated. First 8 teams in table after the regular season (50 games) will promote to the playoffs.

Location of teams in 2016–2017 Slovak Extraliga

Team name	City	Arena	Capacity
HKm Zvolen	Zvolen	Zvolen Ice Stadium	7,038
HC Košice	Košice	Steel Aréna	8,378
HK Nitra	Nitra	Nitra Aréna	3,600
HC ’05 Banská Bystrica	Banská Bystrica	Banská Bystrica Ice Stadium	3,518
HC Nové Zámky	Nové Zámky	Zimný štadión Nové Zámky	3,500
HK Dukla Trenčín	Trenčín	Pavol Demitra Ice Stadium	6,150
HK Poprad	Poprad	Poprad Ice Stadium	4,050
MsHK Žilina	Žilina	Garmin Arena	6,200
MHC Martin	Martin	Martin Ice Stadium	4,200
MHk 32 Liptovský Mikuláš	Liptovský Mikuláš	Zimný štadión Liptovský Mikuláš	3,680
HK Orange 20	Piešťany	EASTON Aréna	3,050

== Regular season ==
Pos	Team	Pld	W	OTW	OTL	L	GF	GA	GD	Pts	Final Result
1	Banská Bystrica	56	34	6	5	11	191	120	+71	119	Advance to Quarterfinals
2	Nitra	56	33	4	5	14	196	154	+42	112	Advance to Quarterfinals
3	Košice	56	28	10	3	15	186	121	+65	107	Advance to Quarterfinals
4	Žilina	56	23	7	7	19	175	158	+17	90	Advance to Quarterfinals
5	Zvolen	56	23	5	5	23	163	174	−11	84	Advance to Quarterfinals
6	Martin	56	19	5	8	24	141	166	−25	75	Advance to Quarterfinals
7	Poprad	56	18	6	9	23	153	167	−14	75	Advance to Quarterfinals
8	Nové Zámky	56	18	5	10	23	146	154	−8	74	Advance to Quarterfinals
9	Trenčín	56	17	7	7	25	140	164	−24	72	Relegation series
10	Liptovský Mikuláš	56	14	6	2	34	138	189	−51	56	Relegation series
	HK Orange 20	20	2	0	0	18	20	82	−62	6	

Source: Tipsport Liga

Rules for classification: 1) Points; 2) Head-to-head points.

== Playoffs ==
=== Bracket ===
Quarterfinals (best-of-7)
1	Banská Bystrica	4
8	Nové Zámky	1
3	Košice	2
6	Martin	4
2	Nitra	4
7	Poprad	0
4	Žilina	4
5	Zvolen	3

Semifinals (best-of-7)
1	Banská Bystrica	4
6	Martin	1
2	Nitra	4
4	Žilina	0

Finals (best-of-7)
1	Banská Bystrica	4
2	Nitra	1

== Relegation series (PlayOut) ==
Pos	Team	Pld	W	OTW	OTL	L	GF	GA	GD	Pts	Final Result
1	Liptovský Mikuláš	12	7	3	0	2	41	26	+15	27	Will play in 2017–18 Slovak Extraliga season
2	Trenčín	12	6	0	4	2	35	27	+8	22	Will play in 2017–18 Slovak Extraliga season
3	Detva	12	5	1	1	5	32	29	+3	18	Will play in 2017–18 Slovak 1. Liga season
4	Skalica	12	1	1	0	10	22	48	−26	5	Will play in 2017–18 Slovak 1. Liga season

Source: Tipsport Liga

Rules for classification: 1) Points; 2) Head-to-head points.

== Final rankings ==
Gold medal	Banská Bystrica
Silver medal	Nitra
Bronze medal	Žilina
4	Martin
5	Košice
6	Zvolen
7	Poprad
8	Nové Zámky
9	Trenčín
10	Liptovský Mikuláš
