= 2018–19 Slovak Extraliga season =

- League: Slovak Extraliga
- Sport: Ice hockey
- Duration: September 2018 – April 2019
- Teams: 13
- Average attendance: 1,1814 ▼

Regular season
- League Champion: HC '05 Banská Bystrica
- Runners-up: HKm Zvolen
- Top scorer: Ladislav Nagy (Košice)

Playoffs
- Playoffs MVP: Samuel Buček (Nitra)

Finals
- Champions: HC '05 Banská Bystrica
- Runners-up: HK Nitra

Slovak Extraliga seasons
- ← 2017–18 2019–20 →

The 2018–19 Slovak Extraliga season was the 26th season of the Slovak Extraliga, the highest level of ice hockey in Slovakia. During the season, HK Orange 20 was created as a project to prepare the Slovakia junior ice hockey team for the IIHF World U20 Championship. The team does not play a complete regular season and cannot advance to the playoffs or get relegated. Since the 2018–19 season, the league also includes two teams from Hungary.

== Regular season ==
=== Standings ===
Each team played 55 games, playing each of the other eleven teams five times. Points were awarded for each game, where three points are awarded for winning in regulation time, two points for winning in overtime or shootout, one point for losing in overtime or shootout, and zero points for losing in regulation time. At the end of the regular season, the team that finishes with the most points was crowned the league champion.

Pos	Team	Pld	W	OTW	OTL	L	GF	GA	GD	Pts	Qualification
1	Banská Bystrica	57	32	7	5	13	196	139	+57	115	Qualification to Quarter-finals
2	Zvolen	57	30	7	7	13	193	128	+65	111	Qualification to Quarter-finals
3	Nitra	57	32	5	4	16	217	138	+79	110	Qualification to Quarter-finals
4	Košice	57	32	4	5	16	190	135	+55	109	Qualification to Quarter-finals
5	Poprad	57	28	9	3	17	168	147	+21	102	Qualification to Quarter-finals
6	Trenčín	57	25	7	4	21	152	131	+21	93	Qualification to Quarter-finals
7	Nové Zámky	57	25	6	5	21	142	130	+12	92	Qualification to Wild card round
8	Miskolc	57	22	6	9	20	147	151	−4	87	Qualification to Wild card round
9	Budapest	57	17	4	7	29	158	197	−39	66	Qualification to Wild card round
10	Detva	57	16	3	8	30	149	198	−49	62	Qualification to Wild card round
11	Liptovský Mikuláš	57	17	2	3	35	129	178	−49	58	
12	Žilina	57	11	7	5	34	151	222	−71	52	Qualification to Relegation playoffs
	HK Orange 20	24	0	0	2	22	30	128	−98	2	

Source: Tipsport Liga
Rules for classification: 1) Points; 2) Head-to-head points

=== Statistics ===
==== Scoring leaders ====
The following players led the league in points, at the conclusion of the regular season.

Player	Team	GP	G	A	Pts	+/–	PIM
(Canada) Éric Faille	HC '05 Banská Bystrica	52	24	48	72	+7	36
(Slovakia) Michal Chovan	HKm Zvolen	56	20	48	68	+16	34
(Slovakia) Ladislav Nagy	HC Košice	48	34	27	61	+25	28
(Canada) Brock Higgs	HC '05 Banská Bystrica	42	24	35	59	+19	28
(Slovakia) Róbert Lantoši	HK Nitra	56	20	38	58	+17	12
(Canada) Guillaume Asselin	HC '05 Banská Bystrica	55	29	26	55	+4	68
(Slovakia) Patrik Svitana	HK Poprad	56	19	33	52	+18	16
(Slovakia) Samuel Buček	HK Nitra	53	30	21	51	+26	20
(Hungary) Bálint Magosi	DVTK Jegesmedvék	57	27	22	49	+16	48
(Slovakia) Rastislav Špirko	HKm Zvolen	48	18	31	49	+15	8

==== Leading goaltenders ====
The following goaltenders led the league in goals against average, provided that they have played at least 40% of their team's minutes, at the conclusion of the regular season.

Player	Team	GP	TOI	W	T	L	GA	SO	Sv%	GAA
(Hungary) Ádám Vay	DVTK Jegesmedvék	31	1886:22	15	8	8	58	7	94.85	1.84
(Slovakia) Michal Valent	HK Dukla Trenčín	49	2887:33	22	10	17	97	2	92.58	2.02
(Canada) Mackenzie Skapski	HKm Zvolen	33	1916:31	15	10	8	68	4	92.80	2.13
(Slovakia) Tomáš Tomek	HKm Zvolen	26	1529:42	15	5	6	55	5	92.48	2.16
(United States) Stephon Williams	HC '05 Banská Bystrica	43	2493:23	24	10	9	91	2	91.85	2.19
(Czech Republic) Vladislav Habal	HC Košice	44	2590:36	25	7	12	96	5	93.22	2.22
(Slovakia) Andrej Košarišťan	HC Nové Zámky	47	2790:01	19	9	19	105	6	93.30	2.26
(Slovakia) Juraj Šimboch	HK Nitra	39	2208:20	22	7	10	85	2	92.09	2.31
(Czech Republic) Tomáš Vošvrda	HK Poprad	38	2225:10	18	9	11	90	5	93.11	2.43
(Hungary) Bence Bálizs	MAC Budapest	32	1825:19	10	7	16	86	3	91.63	2.83

== Relegation series ==
Relegation series played between MsHK Žilina, the 12th team in regular season, and HK Dukla Michalovce, the winner of 1.liga. The winner of best-of-seven series played in Extraliga in 2019–20 season.

=== PlayOut ===
12 March 2019; 19:00	Žilina	3–1 (0–0, 3–0, 0–1)	Michalovce	Garmin Arena, Žilina; Attendance: 1,012

Game reference
6 min	Penalties	4 min
28	Shots	24

13 March 2019; 17:30	Žilina	4–1 (1–1, 0–0, 3–0)	Michalovce	Garmin Arena, Žilina; Attendance: 1,059

Game reference
8 min	Penalties	29 min
45	Shots	36

16 March 2019; 17:30	Michalovce	3–2 OT1 (0–2, 2–0, 0–0, 1–0)	Žilina	Michalovce Ice Stadium, Michalovce; Attendance: 3,955

Game reference
18 min	Penalties	22 min
31	Shots	27

17 March 2019; 17:30	Michalovce	3–0 (2–0, 0–0, 1–0)	Žilina	Michalovce Ice Stadium, Michalovce; Attendance: 4,167

Game reference
52 min	Penalties	93 min
32	Shots	25

19 March 2019; 17:30	Žilina	4–1 (2–1, 0–0, 2–0)	Michalovce	Garmin Arena, Žilina; Attendance: 1,252

Game reference
12 min	Penalties	22 min
46	Shots	37

21 March 2019; 17:30	Michalovce	2–0 (0–0, 1–0, 1–0)	Žilina	Michalovce Ice Stadium, Michalovce; Attendance: 4,327

Game reference
8 min	Penalties	4 min
30	Shots	34

23 March 2019; 17:00	Žilina	1–2 (1–2, 0–0, 0–0)	Michalovce	Garmin Arena, Žilina; Attendance: 2,551

Game reference
29 min	Penalties	10 min
56	Shots	31

Michalovce wins the series 4-3 and will play in 2019–20 Slovak Extraliga season

== Playoffs ==
Ten teams qualify for the playoffs: the top six teams in the regular season have a bye to the quarterfinals, while teams ranked seventh to tenth meet each other (7 versus 10, 8 versus 9) in a preliminary playoff round.

=== Bracket ===
Wild-card round (best-of-5)
7	Nové Zámky	1
10	Detva	3
8	Miskolc	0
9	Budapest	3

Quarter-finals (best-of-7)
1	Banská Bystrica	4
10	Detva	1
4	Košice	2
5	Poprad	4
2	Zvolen	4
9	Budapest	1
3	Nitra	4
6	Trenčín	2

Semi-finals (best-of-7)
1	Banská Bystrica	4
5	Poprad	2
(Pairings are re-seeded after the first and second round)
2	Zvolen	3
3	Nitra	4

Finals (best-of-7)
1	Banská Bystrica	4
3	Nitra	1

=== Wild card round ===
Nové Zámky – Detva 1-3
1.3.2019	Nové Zámky	Detva	4-2
2.3.2019	Nové Zámky	Detva	3-4 OT1
4.3.2019	Detva	Nové Zámky	4-2
5.3.2019	Detva	Nové Zámky	2-1
Detva wins the series 3-1.

Miskolc – Budapest 0-3
1.3.2019	Miskolc	Budapest	1-3
2.3.2019	Miskolc	Budapest	2-3 OT1
4.3.2019	Budapest	Miskolc	4-2
Budapest wins the series 3-0.

=== Quarter-finals ===
Banská Bystrica – Detva 4-1
9.3.2019	Banská Bystrica	Detva	5-0
10.3.2019	Banská Bystrica	Detva	2-4
13.3.2019	Detva	Banská Bystrica	0-1 OT1
14.3.2019	Detva	Banská Bystrica	0-3
17.3.2019	Banská Bystrica	Detva	4-0
Banská Bystrica wins the series 4-1.

Nitra – Trenčín 4-2
11.3.2019	Nitra	Trenčín	2-3 OT1
12.3.2019	Nitra	Trenčín	4-1
15.3.2019	Trenčín	Nitra	5-3
16.3.2019	Trenčín	Nitra	1-4
18.3.2019	Nitra	Trenčín	2-0
20.3.2019	Trenčín	Nitra	0-2
Nitra wins the series 4-2.

Zvolen – Budapest 4-1
9.3.2019	Zvolen	Budapest	4-0
10.3.2019	Zvolen	Budapest	3-2 SO
13.3.2019	Budapest	Zvolen	1-2
14.3.2019	Budapest	Zvolen	2-0
17.3.2019	Zvolen	Budapest	3-1
Zvolen wins the series 4-1.

Košice – Poprad 2-4
11.3.2019	Košice	Poprad	2-3
12.3.2019	Košice	Poprad	1-2 OT1
15.3.2019	Poprad	Košice	4-2
16.3.2019	Poprad	Košice	1-5
18.3.2019	Košice	Poprad	4-3 OT1
20.3.2019	Poprad	Košice	4-2
Poprad wins the series 4-2.

=== Semi-finals ===
Banská Bystrica – Poprad 4-2
23.3.2019	Banská Bystrica	Poprad	5-4
24.3.2019	Banská Bystrica	Poprad	4-3
27.3.2019	Poprad	Banská Bystrica	3-0
28.3.2019	Poprad	Banská Bystrica	2-1 SO
31.3.2019	Banská Bystrica	Poprad	2-1
2.4.2019	Poprad	Banská Bystrica	0-2
Banská Bystrica wins the series 4-2.

Zvolen – Nitra 3-4
25.3.2019	Zvolen	Nitra	2-4
26.3.2019	Zvolen	Nitra	3-2 OT1
29.3.2019	Nitra	Zvolen	3-1
30.3.2019	Nitra	Zvolen	1-2
1.4.2019	Zvolen	Nitra	2-3
3.4.2019	Nitra	Zvolen	1-4
5.4.2019	Zvolen	Nitra	1-4
Nitra wins the series 4-3.

=== Finals ===
9 April 2019; 18:00	Banská Bystrica	3–2 OT1 (1–1, 0–1, 1–0, 1–0)	Nitra	Banská Bystrica Ice Stadium, Banská Bystrica; Attendance: 2,763

Game reference

10 April 2019; 18:00	Banská Bystrica	3–1 (0–0, 2–1, 1–0)	Nitra	Banská Bystrica Ice Stadium, Banská Bystrica; Attendance: 2,813

Game reference

13 April 2019; 18:00	Nitra	3–7 (1–2, 2–3, 0–2)	Banská Bystrica	Nitra Aréna, Nitra; Attendance: 3,600

Game reference

14 April 2019; 19:00	Nitra	2–1 SO (0–0, 1–0, 0–1, 0–0, 1–0)	Banská Bystrica	Nitra Aréna, Nitra; Attendance: 3,600

Game reference

16 April 2019; 18:00	Banská Bystrica	6–2 (3–1, 2–1, 1–0)	Nitra	Banská Bystrica Ice Stadium, Banská Bystrica; Attendance: 2,841

Game reference

== Final rankings ==
Gold medal	Banská Bystrica
Silver medal	Nitra
Bronze medal	Zvolen
4	Poprad
5	Košice
6	Trenčín
7	Budapest
8	Detva
9	Nové Zámky
10	Miskolc
11	Liptovský Mikuláš
12	Žilina
