= Juraj Gráčik =

Slovak ice hockey player (born 1986)

- Born: 14 August 1986 (age 39) Topoľčany, Czechoslovakia
- Height: 6 ft 3 in (191 cm)
- Weight: 176 lb (80 kg; 12 st 8 lb)
- Position: Right wing
- Shot: Right
- Played for: HC Slovan Bratislava; HK Nitra
- NHL draft: 142nd overall, 2004; Atlanta Thrashers
- Playing career: 2003–2014

Juraj Gráčik (born 14 August 1986) is a Slovak former professional ice hockey player.

== Career ==
Gráčik was selected by the Atlanta Thrashers in the 5th round (142nd overall) of the 2004 NHL entry draft. Following his draft selection, he spent two seasons in the Western Hockey League for the Tri-City Americans before returning to Slovakia in 2006 to sign for HC Slovan Bratislava.

In 2011, Gráčik moved to the United Kingdom and signed for the Milton Keynes Lightning in the EPIHL.

== Career statistics ==
=== Regular season and playoffs ===
			Regular season					Playoffs
Season	Team	League	GP	G	A	Pts	PIM	GP	G	A	Pts	PIM
2003–04	HC VTJ Telvis Topoľčany	SVK.2	28	16	8	24	8	—	—	—	—	—
2004–05	Tri–City Americans	WHL	33	4	2	6	18	—	—	—	—	—
2005–06	Tri–City Americans	WHL	53	22	23	45	36	—	—	—	—	—
2006–07	HC Slovan Bratislava	Slovak	37	5	1	6	6	3	0	0	0	0
2006–07	HC Topoľčany	SVK.2	7	8	1	9	18	—	—	—	—	—
2006–07	HK Ružinov 99 Bratislava	SVK.2	13	7	5	12	16	—	—	—	—	—
2007–08	HC Slovan Bratislava	Slovak	40	3	4	7	10	11	0	0	0	0
2007–08	HK Ružinov 99 Bratislava	SVK.2	10	5	3	8	10	4	1	2	3	4
2008–09	HC Slovan Bratislava	Slovak	50	1	3	4	8	12	2	2	4	4
2008–09	HK Ružinov 99 Bratislava	SVK.2	6	5	2	7	26	2	1	1	2	0
2009–10	HC K´CERO Nitra	Slovak	44	6	7	13	36	10	2	0	2	2
2010–11	HC Topoľčany	SVK.2	36	16	18	34	48	—	—	—	—	—
2010–11	HK Trnava	SVK.2	—	—	—	—	—	3	0	2	2	0
2011–12	Milton Keynes Lightning	GBR.2	32	14	24	38	49	—	—	—	—	—
2011–12	Bemaco HC 46 Bardejov	SVK.2	3	1	4	5	2	13	2	3	5	4
2012–13	HC Topoľčany	SVK.2	36	23	14	37	26	—	—	—	—	—
2013–14	HC Topoľčany	SVK.2	9	5	4	9	4	—	—	—	—	—
SVK.2 totals			148	86	59	145	158	22	4	8	12	10
Slovak totals			171	15	15	30	60	36	4	2	6	6

=== International ===
Year	Team	Event	GP	G	A	Pts	PIM
2004	Slovakia	WJC18	6	2	0	2	4
2005	Slovakia	WJC	6	0	0	0	2
2006	Slovakia	WJC	6	2	2	4	4
Junior totals			18	4	2	6	10
