= Ladislav Ščurko =

Slovak ice hockey player

- Born: 4 April 1986 (age 40) Gelnica, Czechoslovakia
- Height: 6 ft 1 in (185 cm)
- Weight: 205 lb (93 kg; 14 st 9 lb)
- Position: Centre
- Shoots: Left
- Slovak 1. Liga team Former teams: HC Prešov; HK Spišská Nová Ves; HC Košice; HK Trebišov; HK Slovan Gelnica; HC 46 Bardejov; HK Dukla Michalovce; HC 07 Detva
- NHL draft: 170th overall, 2004; Philadelphia Flyers
- Playing career: 2007–2009; 2011–present

Ladislav Ščurko (born 4 April 1986) is a Slovak professional ice hockey center who currently playing for HC Prešov in Slovak 1. Liga.

He previously played for HC Košice until he confessed to a murder of an ice hockey referee in April 2009.

== Playing career ==
Ščurko started his junior career by playing in 37 games with his junior team, HK VTJ Spisská Nová Ves, in Slovakia. He scored 44 points on 20 goals and 24 assists. Following that season he was drafted by the Philadelphia Flyers in the sixth round, 170th overall, in the 2004 NHL entry draft. Shortly after, he was drafted seventh overall in the CHL Import Draft by the Seattle Thunderbirds. In his first year in the Western Hockey League (WHL), he scored 42 points, which put him in fifth in the league for points scored by a rookie. He also set a Thunderbird record with a nine-game point streak from December 11, 2004 through January 12, 2005, during which he scored 12 points. He enjoyed similar success in fewer games the following season.

== Murder ==
Ladislav Ščurko
- Born: Ladislav Ščurko; April 4, 1986 (age 40); Gelnica
- Conviction: Murder
- Penalty: Eight years' imprisonment

Details
- Victims: 1 killed (Marek Liptaj)
- Span of crimes: January 2008 –
- Country: Slovakia
- Date apprehended: April 23, 2009; 17 years ago

On April 23, 2009, Ščurko confessed to a murder of referee Marek Liptaj in January 2008 at a motorway service area near Kosice. He admitted that he killed Liptaj by stabbing him fourteen times with a knife. Liptaj's body was hastily buried in a forest. No motive was revealed, but police said the crime was not premeditated.

On July 16, 2012, Ščurko was convicted of the murder; however, because psychiatric examinations found that Ščurko committed the act in a state of diminished sanity, the court sentenced him to the minimum penalty of eight years in prison.

=== First imprisonment ===
He served his first sentence from April 2009 to November 2011.

=== Life after the first release ===
Ščurko was released from jail on November 8, 2011 and played his first hockey game after the release from prison on December 3, 2011. He played for his boyhood club HK Slovan Gelnica.

=== Second imprisonment ===
Ščurko served the rest of his sentence from September 2014 to December 2015 and was finally conditionally released before Christmas in 2015.

== Playing career after the second release ==
He signed a contract with HC 46 Bardejov, which plays in the second-level ice hockey league in Slovakia, only one week after the release from prison. He played his first game for HC 46 Bardejov on December 22, 2015.

Since the 2017–2018 season, Ščurko has been playing in Slovak Extraliga for HC 07 Detva.

== Career statistics ==
=== Regular season and playoffs ===
			Regular season					Playoffs
Season	Team	League	GP	G	A	Pts	PIM	GP	G	A	Pts	PIM
2002–03	HK Spišská Nová Ves	SVK U18
2003–04	HK Spišská Nová Ves	SVK U20	37	20	24	44	102	6	6	2	8	8
2003–04	HK Spišská Nová Ves	SVK.2	30	2	3	5	16	2	0	1	1	2
2004–05	Seattle Thunderbirds	WHL	67	17	25	42	40	12	5	1	6	10
2005–06	Seattle Thunderbirds	WHL	64	17	26	43	41	7	2	4	6	2
2006–07	Tri–City Americans	WHL	12	4	6	10	18	—	—	—	—	—
2007–08	HC Košice	Slovak	33	0	2	2	30	16	1	0	1	18
2007–08	HK VTJ Trebišov	SVK.2	17	7	4	11	48	—	—	—	—	—
2008–09	HC Košice	Slovak	52	7	5	12	38	18	0	1	1	16
2008–09	HK Trebišov	SVK.2	11	9	10	19	45	—	—	—	—	—
2011–12	HK Slovan Gelnica	SVK.3	10	19	7	26	10	—	—	—	—	—
2011–12	HK Trebišov	SVK.2	10	15	9	24	8	—	—	—	—	—
2012–13	HK Trebišov	SVK.2	20	11	15	26	20	—	—	—	—	—
2012–13	Bemaco HC 46 Bardejov	SVK.2	24	15	11	26	39	10	5	6	11	8
2012–13	HK Slovan Gelnica	SVK.3	7	8	5	13	6	—	—	—	—	—
2013–14	Bemaco HC 46 Bardejov	SVK.2	40	26	23	49	26	13	6	8	14	14
2013–14	HK Slovan Gelnica	SVK.3	2	4	2	6	2	—	—	—	—	—
2015–16	Bemaco HC 46 Bardejov	SVK.2	13	3	4	7	4	12	3	2	5	18
2016–17	HK Dukla Michalovce	SVK.2	44	20	27	47	34	7	3	5	8	8
2017–18	HC 07 Orin Detva	Slovak	54	17	11	28	80	—	—	—	—	—
2018–19	HC 07 Detva	Slovak	55	12	18	30	92	9	4	1	5	4
2019–20	HC 07 WPC Detva	Slovak	34	11	11	22	36	—	—	—	—	—
2020–21	HC 07 WPC Detva	Slovak	48	9	9	18	67	4	0	0	0	0
2021–22	HK Spišská Nová Ves	Slovak	43	2	8	10	30	3	0	0	0	2
SVK.2 totals			226	112	110	222	256	44	17	22	39	50
Slovak totals			319	58	64	122	373	50	5	2	7	40

=== International ===
Medal record

Representing Slovakia

Men's ice hockey

World U18 Championships
Silver medal – second place	2003 Yaroslavl	

Year	Team	Event	Result	GP	G	A	Pts	PIM
2003	Slovakia	WJC18	2nd place, silver medalist(s)	7	0	2	2	2
2004	Slovakia	WJC18	6th	6	0	3	3	6
2005	Slovakia	WJC	7th	6	0	0	0	6
2006	Slovakia	WJC	8th	6	2	0	2	16
Junior totals				25	2	5	7	30

== Awards and honors ==
Award	Year
Slovak
Champion	2009

== Records ==
- Seattle Thunderbirds' franchise record for longest point streak: 9 games (12 points, from 11 December 2004 to 12 January 2005)
