= Filip Šimka =

Slovak ice hockey player

- Born: February 18, 1986 (age 39) Czechoslovakia
- Height: 6 ft 1 in (185 cm)
- Weight: 187 lb (85 kg; 13 st 5 lb)
- Position: Defence
- Shoots: Left
- Polska Liga Hokejowa team: Comarch Cracovia Kraków
- NHL draft: Undrafted
- Playing career: 1993–present

Filip Šimka (born February 18, 1986) is a Slovak professional ice hockey defenceman who is currently playing in the Polish Hockey Superleague. He had previously played in the Slovak Extraliga with MHC Martin and HK Nitra.

== Career statistics ==
			Regular season					Playoffs
Season	Team	League	GP	G	A	Pts	PIM	GP	G	A	Pts	PIM
2003–04	MHC Martin U18	Slovak U18	21	4	11	15	76	—	—	—	—	—
2003–04	MHC Martin U20	Slovak U20	28	1	5	6	36	—	—	—	—	—
2004–05	HC Slovan Bratislava U20	Slovak U20	34	3	6	9	42	—	—	—	—	—
2004–05	MHC Martin	Slovak2	22	0	4	4	8	—	—	—	—	—
2005–06	MHC Martin U20	Slovak U20	31	3	13	16	42	—	—	—	—	—
2005–06	MHC Martin	Slovak	24	0	0	0	34	—	—	—	—	—
2005–06	HK 95 Povazska Bystrica	Slovak2	4	0	0	0	0	—	—	—	—	—
2006–07	MHC Martin	Slovak	29	0	0	0	12	4	0	0	0	0
2006–07	MHC Prievidza	Slovak2	9	2	4	6	28	—	—	—	—	—
2007–08	HK Nitra	Slovak	40	0	4	4	48	—	—	—	—	—
2007–08	MHK Dolny Kubin	Slovak2	4	0	1	1	4	—	—	—	—	—
2008–09	MsHK Zilina	Slovak	14	0	1	1	16	—	—	—	—	—
2008–09	MHK Dolny Kubin	Slovak2	34	3	14	17	98	—	—	—	—	—
2009–10	MHC Martin	Slovak	15	0	2	2	12	—	—	—	—	—
2009–10	MHK Dolny Kubin	Slovak2	6	0	0	0	8	—	—	—	—	—
2009–10	HC 07 Prešov	Slovak2	4	0	0	0	8	15	3	2	5	26
2010–11	Caracovia Krakow	Poland	22	3	5	8	40	4	0	1	1	0
2011–12	HK Trnava	Slovak2	33	4	7	11	84	—	—	—	—	—
2011–12	HC Presov	Slovak2	2	0	0	0	14	3	0	0	0	2
Slovak totals			122	0	7	7	122	4	0	0	0	0
Slovak2 totals			118	9	30	39	252	18	3	2	5	28
