= Tomáš Špila =

Slovak ice hockey player

- Born: 16 April 1984 (age 41) Bratislava, Czechoslovakia
- Height: 6 ft 0 in (183 cm)
- Weight: 212 lb (96 kg; 15 st 2 lb)
- Position: Defenceman
- Shot: Left
- Slovak Extraliga team: HC Slovan Bratislava
- Playing career: 2003–2014

Tomáš Špila (born 16 April 1984) is a Slovak former professional ice hockey defenceman. He played with HC Slovan Bratislava in the Slovak Extraliga.

== Career statistics ==
			Regular season					Playoffs
Season	Team	League	GP	G	A	Pts	PIM	GP	G	A	Pts	PIM
2001–02	Quebec Remparts	QMJHL	69	3	6	9	125	—	—	—	—	—
2002–03	Drummondville Voltigeurs	QMJHL	7	0	0	0	9	—	—	—	—	—
2002–03	HC Oceláři Třinec U20	Czech U20	21	2	2	4	42	12	1	1	2	28
2003–04	HC Slovan Bratislava	Slovak	16	0	0	0	75	—	—	—	—	—
2004–05	HC Slovan Bratislava	Slovak	6	0	0	0	6	9	0	0	0	4
2004–05	HK Trnava	Slovak2	12	1	2	3	39	—	—	—	—	—
2005–06	HC Slovan Bratislava	Slovak	10	0	0	0	4	—	—	—	—	—
2005–06	HK Nitra	Slovak	4	0	0	0	2	—	—	—	—	—
2005–06	Thetford Mines Prolab	LNAH	25	0	2	2	12	—	—	—	—	—
2006–07	Frederikshavn White Hawks	Denmark	8	1	0	1	40	—	—	—	—	—
2006–07	Stjernen Hockey	Norway	15	2	2	4	61	—	—	—	—	—
2006–07	HC Slavia Praha	Czech	12	1	0	1	10	—	—	—	—	—
2006–07	HC Havlíčkův Brod	Czech2	5	0	1	1	8	—	—	—	—	—
2007–08	MsHK Zilina	Slovak	24	1	5	6	69	2	0	0	0	10
2007–08	HK Nitra	Slovak	28	0	1	1	50	—	—	—	—	—
2008–09	HC Benátky nad Jizerou	Czech2	5	0	0	0	2	—	—	—	—	—
2008–09	HKM Lucenec	Slovak2	15	4	3	7	43	—	—	—	—	—
2008–09	MHC Prievidza	Slovak2	11	1	3	4	10	7	0	0	0	8
2009–10	HKm Detva	Slovak2	25	1	5	6	132	—	—	—	—	—
2010–11	HKm Detva	Slovak2	37	12	16	28	140	7	1	2	3	51
2011–12	HC Presov 07	Slovak2	43	6	10	16	81	3	0	0	0	4
2012–13	HC Detva	Slovak2	29	2	7	9	24	7	0	1	1	2
2013–14	HK 32 Liptovsky Mikulas	Slovak2	44	2	12	14	58	5	0	0	0	4
Slovak totals			88	1	6	7	206	11	0	0	0	14
Slovak2 totals			216	29	58	87	527	29	1	3	4	69
