= Peter Šišovský =

Slovak ice hockey player (born 1991)

- Born: August 15, 1991 (age 34) Dubnica nad Váhom, TCH
- Height: 6 ft 1 in (185 cm)
- Weight: 183 lb (83 kg; 13 st 1 lb)
- Position: Right wing
- Shoots: Left
- Slovak 1. Liga team Former teams: HK Spartak Dubnica; HK Dukla Trenčín; MHC Martin; MHK Dolný Kubín; HK Orange 20; ŠHK 37 Piešťany; HK 95 Považská Bystrica; HC Prešov; HKM Zvolen; HC Topoľčany; HC 07 Detva; HC Vítkovice Ridera; HC Slovan Bratislava; HK Poprad; HC Nové Zámky
- Playing career: 2009–present

Peter Šišovský (born August 15, 1991) is a Slovak professional ice hockey player who currently playing professionally for HK Spartak Dubnica of the Slovak 1. Liga.

He has previously played for HC 07 Detva, MHC Martin, HK Dukla Trenčín, ŠHK 37 Piešťany, HKM Zvolen and HC Vítkovice Ridera.

== Career statistics ==
=== Regular season and playoffs ===
			Regular season					Playoffs
Season	Team	League	GP	G	A	Pts	PIM	GP	G	A	Pts	PIM
2007–08	HK Dukla Trenčín	Slovak-Jr.	11	3	3	6	18	—	—	—	—	—
2007–08	MHK Dubnica nad Váhom	Slovak-Jr.2	4	1	5	6	6	—	—	—	—	—
2008–09	MHC Martin	Slovak-Jr.	39	18	27	45	72	—	—	—	—	—
2008–09	MHC Martin	Slovak	1	0	2	2	0	2	0	1	1	0
2008–09	MHK Dolný Kubín	Slovak.1	4	1	2	3	8	—	—	—	—	—
2008–09	HK Orange 20	Slovak	7	0	1	1	6	—	—	—	—	—
2009–10	MHC Martin	Slovak-Jr.	38	29	17	46	40	—	—	—	—	—
2009–10	MHC Martin	Slovak	2	0	0	0	0	—	—	—	—	—
2009–10	MHK Dolný Kubín	Slovak.1	3	0	2	2	0	—	—	—	—	—
2009–10	HK Orange 20	Slovak	8	5	1	6	8	—	—	—	—	—
2010–11	MHC Martin	Slovak-Jr.	7	9	6	15	0	8	6	9	15	53
2010–11	MHC Martin	Slovak	7	2	2	4	4	—	—	—	—	—
2010–11	MHK Dolný Kubín	Slovak.1	1	4	0	4	2	—	—	—	—	—
2010–11	HK Orange 20	Slovak	19	0	3	3	4	—	—	—	—	—
2011–12	MHC Martin	Slovak	39	7	5	12	18	—	—	—	—	—
2012–13	HK Dukla Trenčín	Slovak	22	0	1	1	29	—	—	—	—	—
2012–13	ŠHK 37 Piešťany	Slovak	23	3	4	7	8	14	1	0	1	4
2013–14	ŠHK 37 Piešťany	Slovak	15	1	0	1	2	—	—	—	—	—
2013–14	HK Dukla Trenčín	Slovak	25	6	8	14	22	—	—	—	—	—
2014–15	HK Dukla Trenčín	Slovak	51	9	18	27	72	5	1	1	2	6
2015–16	HK Dukla Trenčín	Slovak	29	4	5	9	12	5	0	0	0	2
2016–17	HK 95 Považská Bystrica	Slovak.1	8	0	4	4	8	—	—	—	—	—
2016–17	HC Prešov	Slovak.1	13	3	7	10	33	—	—	—	—	—
2016–17	HKM Zvolen	Slovak	27	7	7	14	39	7	2	3	5	0
2017–18	HKM Zvolen	Slovak	49	17	21	38	28	12	7	1	8	12
2018–19	HKM Zvolen	Slovak	53	13	12	25	28	12	0	2	2	4
2019–20	HC Topoľčany	Slovak.1	2	1	1	2	4	—	—	—	—	—
2019–20	HC 07 Detva	Slovak	31	13	21	34	36	—	—	—	—	—
2019–20	HC Vítkovice Ridera	Czech	8	1	5	6	4	—	—	—	—	—
2020–21	HC Vítkovice Ridera	Czech	14	0	1	1	0	—	—	—	—	—
2020–21	HC Slovan Bratislava	Slovak	22	5	5	10	10	10	1	2	3	4
2021–22	HK Poprad	Slovak	13	1	5	6	16	—	—	—	—	—
Slovak totals			443	93	121	214	342	67	12	10	22	32

=== International ===
Year	Team	Event	Result	GP	G	A	Pts	PIM
2009	Slovakia	WJC18	7th	6	1	0	1	6
2011	Slovakia	WJC	8th	6	1	0	1	4
Junior totals				12	2	0	2	10
