= Adam Drgoň =

Slovak ice hockey player

- Born: 16 February 1985 (age 41) Trnava, Czechoslovakia
- Height: 6 ft 1 in (185 cm)
- Weight: 176 lb (80 kg; 12 st 8 lb)
- Position: Defence
- Shoots: Right
- Slovak team Former teams: HK Dukla Michalovce; HC Slovan Bratislava; HC Dukla Senica; HK Trnava; Lausitzer Füchse; HK Martin; MHK Dolný Kubín; HK Dukla Michalovce; ŠHK 37 Piešťany; HC Košice; HK Dukla Trenčín; HKM Zvolen; HK Poprad
- NHL draft: Undrafted
- Playing career: 2003–present

Adam Drgoň (born 16 February 1985) is a Slovak professional ice hockey player who currently playing for HK Dukla Michalovce of the Slovak Extraliga.

== Career ==
He had previously played for HC Slovan Bratislava, HC Dukla Senica, HK Trnava, Lausitzer Füchse, HK Martin, MHK Dolný Kubín, HK Dukla Michalovce, ŠHK 37 Piešťany, HC Košice, HK Dukla Trenčín and HKM Zvolen.

== Career statistics ==
=== Regular season and playoffs ===
			Regular season					Playoffs
Season	Team	League	GP	G	A	Pts	PIM	GP	G	A	Pts	PIM
2002–03	HC Slovan Bratislava	Slovak-Jr.	20	3	3	6	18	—	—	—	—	—
2003–04	HC Slovan Bratislava	Slovak-Jr.	29	1	6	7	22	—	—	—	—	—
2003–04	HC Slovan Bratislava	Slovak	11	0	0	0	0	—	—	—	—	—
2003–04	HC Dukla Senica	Slovak.1	3	0	0	0	0	—	—	—	—	—
2004–05	HC Slovan Bratislava	Slovak-Jr.	41	2	17	19	74	3	0	2	2	2
2004–05	HC Slovan Bratislava	Slovak	1	0	0	0	0	—	—	—	—	—
2004–05	HK Trnava	Slovak.1	10	0	0	0	14	—	—	—	—	—
2005–06	HK Trnava	Slovak.1	36	5	4	9	171	—	—	—	—	—
2006–07	HK Trnava	Slovak.1	23	4	10	14	36	—	—	—	—	—
2006–07	Lausitzer Füchse	DEL2	24	1	8	9	71	—	—	—	—	—
2007–08	Lausitzer Füchse	DEL2	48	7	18	25	68	—	—	—	—	—
2008–09	HK Martin	Slovak	56	1	5	6	18	2	0	0	0	0
2008–09	MHK Dolný Kubín	Slovak.1	1	0	0	0	0	—	—	—	—	—
2009–10	HK Martin	Slovak	38	1	5	6	18	11	1	0	1	4
2010–11	HK Martin	Slovak	41	1	8	9	28	—	—	—	—	—
2011–12	HK Martin	Slovak	46	1	5	6	85	—	—	—	—	—
2011–12	HK Dukla Michalovce	Slovak.1	—	—	—	—	—	1	0	0	0	2
2012–13	ŠHK 37 Piešťany	Slovak	51	2	13	15	85	14	0	7	7	12
2013–14	ŠHK 37 Piešťany	Slovak	52	3	8	11	38	11	0	0	0	20
2014–15	HC Košice	Slovak	52	0	5	5	20	13	0	1	1	2
2014–15	ŠHK 37 Piešťany	Slovak	9	0	1	1	2	—	—	—	—	—
2015–16	HK Dukla Trenčín	Slovak	42	2	19	21	44	5	0	0	0	2
2016–17	HK Dukla Trenčín	Slovak	42	3	12	15	24	—	—	—	—	—
2017–18	HKM Zvolen	Slovak	47	8	11	19	30	—	—	—	—	—
2018–19	HKM Zvolen	Slovak	43	8	12	20	18	12	1	1	2	8
2019–20	HKM Zvolen	Slovak	45	1	11	12	28	—	—	—	—	—
2020–21	HK Poprad	Slovak	50	6	25	31	22	14	1	4	5	18
2021–22	HK Poprad	Slovak	49	11	26	37	34	7	1	4	5	2
2022–23	HK Poprad	Slovak	47	7	17	24	55	3	0	0	0	2
2023–24	HK Poprad	Slovak	24	2	9	11	45	—	—	—	—	—
Slovak totals			746	57	192	249	594	92	4	17	21	70

Medal record

Representing Slovakia

Men's ice hockey

World U18 Championships
Silver medal – second place	2003 Russia	

=== International ===
Year	Team	Event	Result	GP	G	A	Pts	PIM
2003	Slovakia	WJC18	2nd place, silver medalist(s)	7	1	0	1	12
Junior totals				7	1	0	1	12

== Awards and honors ==
Award	Year
Slovak
Champion	2005, 2015
