= Marek Priechodský =

Slovak ice hockey player

- Born: October 22, 1979 (age 45); Bratislava, Czechoslovakia
- Height: 6 ft 2 in (188 cm)
- Weight: 205 lb (93 kg; 14 st 9 lb)
- Position: Defence
- Shot: Left
- Played for: HC Dukla Senica; HC Slovan Bratislava; Pensacola Ice Pilots; HKM Zvolen; KHL Medveščak; MHC Martin; HC Banska Bystrica; HK 36 Skalica; MsHK Zilina; Podhale Nowy Targ; Chamonix HC; HC 07 Detva; Eindhoven Kemphanen; HK Spisska Nova Ves
- NHL draft: 222nd overall, 2000; Tampa Bay Lightning
- Playing career: 1998–2012

Marek Priechodský (born October 24, 1979) is a Slovak former professional ice hockey player who played with HC Slovan Bratislava in the Slovak Extraliga.

He also played for HKm Zvolen, MHC Martin, KHL Medveščak in Croatia and Podhale Nowy Targ in Poland. In 2010, he moved to the Netherlands.

== Career statistics ==
=== Regular season and playoffs ===
			Regular season					Playoffs
Season	Team	League	GP	G	A	Pts	PIM	GP	G	A	Pts	PIM
1998–99	HC Dukla Senica	SVK.2	33	1	10	11	30	—	—	—	—	—
1999–2000	HC Slovan Bratislava	SVK	6	0	0	0	2	—	—	—	—	—
1999–2000	HC Slovan Bratislava B	SVK.2	31	2	9	11	56	—	—	—	—	—
2000–01	HC Slovan Bratislava	SVK	43	0	5	5	6	1	0	0	0	0
2001–02	Pensacola Ice Pilots	ECHL	52	3	11	14	33	3	0	0	0	0
2002–03	Pensacola Ice Pilots	ECHL	35	0	3	3	28	—	—	—	—	—
2003–04	HKm Zvolen	SVK	41	0	7	7	20	15	0	0	0	2
2004–05	KHL Medveščak Zagreb	IEHL	15	3	2	5	48	—	—	—	—	—
2004–05	HKm Zvolen B	SVK.2	7	0	1	1	28	—	—	—	—	—
2004–05	HC Martimex ZŤS Martin	SVK.2	10	2	3	5	20	8	0	2	2	14
2005–06	HKm Zvolen	SVK	41	1	3	4	20	4	0	0	0	2
2005–06	HC ’05 Banská Bystrica	SVK.2	4	0	3	3	2	2	0	1	1	0
2006–07	HKm Zvolen	SVK	53	5	11	16	64	10	0	1	1	8
2007–08	HK 36 Skalica	SVK	17	0	3	3	8	—	—	—	—	—
2007–08	MsHK Žilina	SVK	7	0	1	1	8	—	—	—	—	—
2007–08	Podhale Nowy Targ	POL	14	1	6	7	4	—	0	4	4	—
2008–09	Podhale Nowy Targ	POL	31	3	20	23	36	—	—	—	—	—
2009–10	Chamonix HC	FRA	24	2	3	5	14	3	0	0	0	2
2010–11	HC 07 Detva	SVK.2	10	1	5	6	8	—	—	—	—	—
2010–11	Eindhoven Kemphanen	NED	32	0	7	7	24	3	0	1	1	0
2011–12	HK Spišská Nová Ves	SVK.2	22	1	6	7	12	—	—	—	—	—
SVK totals			208	6	30	36	128	30	0	1	1	12
SVK.2 totals			117	7	37	44	156	10	0	3	3	14

=== International ===
Year	Team	Event	GP	G	A	Pts	PIM
1999	Slovakia	WJC	6	0	0	0	6
Junior totals			6	0	0	0	6
