= Erik Weissmann =

Slovak ice hockey player

- Born: May 27, 1978 (age 46); Bratislava, Czechoslovakia
- Height: 5 ft 11 in (180 cm)
- Weight: 181 lb (82 kg; 12 st 13 lb)
- Position: Left wing
- Shot: Left
- Played for: RSL/KHL; Sibir Novosibirsk; Lada Togliatti; Slovak Extraliga; HC Slovan Bratislava; HK Nitra; HKm Zvolen; HC Košice; HK SKP Poprad; HC Banska Bystrica; Czech Extraliga; HC Zlín; HC Vítkovice; Slavia Praha; Serie A SG Pontebba; SG Cortina
- NHL draft: Undrafted
- Playing career: 1997–2016

Erik Weissmann (Born May 27, 1978) is a Slovak former professional ice hockey player.

== Career ==
Weissmann played in the Slovak Extraliga for HC Slovan Bratislava, HK Nitra, HKm Zvolen, HC Košice, HK Poprad and HC '05 Banská Bystrica. He also played in the Czech Extraliga for HC Zlín, HC Vítkovice and Slavia Praha, the Russian Superleague for HC Sibir Novosibirsk and the Kontinental Hockey League for HC Lada Togliatti.

While playing with HKm Zvolen during the 2005–06 Slovak Extraliga season, Weissmann topped the Slovak Extraliga with the most goals (30) and most points (59).

== Career statistics ==
| | | | Regular season | | | | | Playoffs |
| Season | Team | League | GP | G | A | Pts | PIM | GP | G | A | Pts | PIM |
|---|---|---|---|---|---|---|---|---|---|---|---|---|
| 1996–97 | HC Slovan Bratislava | SVK | 2 | 0 | 0 | 0 | 0 | — | — | — | — | — |
| 1997–98 | HC Dukla Senica | SVK.2 | 39 | 16 | 5 | 21 | 62 | — | — | — | — | — |
| 1998–99 | MHC Nitra | SVK | 26 | 12 | 4 | 16 | 18 | — | — | — | — | — |
| 1998–99 | HK Trnava | SVK.2 | 19 | 9 | 8 | 17 | 10 | — | — | — | — | — |
| 1999–2000 | HC Slovan Bratislava | SVK | 19 | 1 | 3 | 4 | 29 | 1 | 0 | 0 | 0 | 0 |
| 1999–2000 | HC Slovan Bratislava B | SVK.2 | 23 | 21 | 14 | 35 | 20 | — | — | — | — | — |
| 2000–01 | HC Slovan Bratislava | SVK | 50 | 9 | 14 | 23 | 10 | 6 | 1 | 2 | 3 | 6 |
| 2001–02 | HKm Zvolen | SVK | 46 | 8 | 6 | 14 | 41 | — | — | — | — | — |
| 2002–03 | HKm Zvolen | SVK | 50 | 16 | 13 | 29 | 83 | 1 | 1 | 0 | 1 | 2 |
| 2002–03 | HKm Zvolen B | IEHL | 1 | 0 | 0 | 0 | 0 | — | — | — | — | — |
| 2003–04 | HC Hamé Zlín | ELH | 50 | 7 | 7 | 14 | 34 | 15 | 1 | 0 | 1 | 41 |
| 2004–05 | HKm Zvolen | SVK | 41 | 7 | 18 | 25 | 51 | 17 | 5 | 1 | 6 | 16 |
| 2005–06 | HKm Zvolen | SVK | 52 | 30 | 29 | 59 | 54 | 4 | 0 | 0 | 0 | 4 |
| 2006–07 | HC Sibir Novosibirsk | RSL | 11 | 2 | 2 | 4 | 8 | — | — | — | — | — |
| 2006–07 | HC Vítkovice Steel | ELH | 26 | 6 | 9 | 15 | 30 | — | — | — | — | — |
| 2007–08 | HC Vítkovice Steel | ELH | 17 | 3 | 2 | 5 | 4 | — | — | — | — | — |
| 2007–08 | HC Košice | SVK | 27 | 5 | 15 | 20 | 26 | 19 | 3 | 6 | 9 | 24 |
| 2008–09 | Metallurg Zhlobin | BLR | 30 | 10 | 13 | 23 | 20 | — | — | — | — | — |
| 2008–09 | HK Aquacity ŠKP Poprad | SVK | 9 | 2 | 6 | 8 | 26 | — | — | — | — | — |
| 2009–10 | Lada Togliatti | KHL | 9 | 1 | 1 | 2 | 4 | — | — | — | — | — |
| 2009–10 | HC Dukla Senica | SVK.2 | 5 | 3 | 7 | 10 | 2 | — | — | — | — | — |
| 2010–11 | Krylya Sovetov Moscow | VHL | 3 | 0 | 2 | 2 | 2 | — | — | — | — | — |
| 2010–11 | HC ’05 Banská Bystrica | SVK | 10 | 2 | 3 | 5 | 12 | 14 | 4 | 3 | 7 | 6 |
| 2011–12 | Kazzinc–Torpedo | VHL | 19 | 2 | 4 | 6 | 8 | 3 | 1 | 1 | 2 | 4 |
| 2011–12 | Kazzinc–Torpedo–2 | KAZ | 1 | 2 | 1 | 3 | 0 | — | — | — | — | — |
| 2012–13 | SG Pontebba | ITA | 34 | 10 | 15 | 25 | 30 | — | — | — | — | — |
| 2012–13 | SG Cortina | ITA | 5 | 4 | 7 | 11 | 4 | 11 | 2 | 6 | 8 | 8 |
| 2013–14 | HC Nové Zámky | MOL | 43 | 21 | 36 | 57 | 16 | 8 | 4 | 4 | 8 | 6 |
| 2014–15 | HC Slavia Praha | ELH | 9 | 0 | 1 | 1 | 2 | — | — | — | — | — |
| 2014–15 | Beibarys Atyrau | KAZ | 7 | 0 | 1 | 1 | 6 | — | — | — | — | — |
| 2014–15 | HC Nové Zámky | MOL | 12 | 7 | 8 | 15 | 6 | 9 | 4 | 2 | 6 | 0 |
| 2014–15 | HC Nové Zámky | SVK.3 | 4 | 2 | 2 | 4 | 0 | — | — | — | — | — |
| 2015–16 | HC Nové Zámky | SVK.2 | 30 | 5 | 6 | 11 | 18 | — | — | — | — | — |
| 2015–16 | HC Dukla Senica | SVK.2 | 2 | 1 | 1 | 2 | 2 | 4 | 1 | 3 | 4 | 4 |
| SVK totals | | | 332 | 92 | 111 | 203 | 350 | 62 | 14 | 12 | 26 | 58 |
| SVK.2 totals | | | 118 | 55 | 41 | 96 | 114 | 4 | 1 | 3 | 4 | 4 |
| ELH totals | | | 102 | 16 | 19 | 35 | 70 | 15 | 1 | 0 | 1 | 41 |
