= Miroslav Lažo =

Slovak ice hockey player

- Born: October 18, 1977 (age 47); Bratislava, Czechoslovakia
- Height: 5 ft 10 in (178 cm)
- Weight: 194 lb (88 kg; 13 st 12 lb)
- Position: Right wing
- Shot: Right
- HA team Former teams: Malmö Redhawks; Slovak Extraliga; HC Slovan Bratislava; MsHK Žilina; HC Košice; HC 05 Banská Bystrica; Czech Extraliga; HC Kladno; Kontinental Hockey League; Avtomobilist Yekaterinburg; Russian Major League (VHL); Sputnik Nizhny Tagil
- Playing career: 1994–2014

Miroslav Lažo (born October 18, 1977) is a Slovak professional ice hockey player (right wing) currently playing in Malmö Redhawks of the HockeyAllsvenskan. He has played with the HC Slovan Bratislava in the Slovak Extraliga.

== Career statistics ==
			Regular season					Playoffs
Season	Team	League	GP	G	A	Pts	PIM	GP	G	A	Pts	PIM
1995–96	HC Slovan Bratislava U20	Slovak U20	30	5	5	10	77	—	—	—	—	—
1996–97	HC Slovan Bratislava U20	Slovak U20	31	9	4	13	117	—	—	—	—	—
1996–97	HC Slovan Bratislava	Slovak	4	0	0	0	25	—	—	—	—	—
1997–98	HC Dukla Senica	Slovak2	12	0	0	0	55	—	—	—	—	—
1998–99	HK Trnava	Slovak2	35	26	5	31	129	—	—	—	—	—
1998–99	HC Slovan Bratislava	Slovak	1	0	1	1	0	—	—	—	—	—
1999–00	HC Slovan Bratislava B	Slovak2	21	26	7	33	112	—	—	—	—	—
1999–00	HC Slovan Bratislava	Slovak	2	0	0	0	2	—	—	—	—	—
1999–00	Quad City Mallards	UHL	1	0	0	0	2	—	—	—	—	—
2000–01	HC Slovan Bratislava	Slovak	13	1	1	2	12	—	—	—	—	—
2000–01	EV Regensburg	Germany3	27	16	9	25	69	—	—	—	—	—
2001–02	MsHK Zilina	Slovak	48	13	9	22	158	—	—	—	—	—
2002–03	MsHK Zilina	Slovak	36	13	17	30	62	—	—	—	—	—
2002–03	HC Slovan Bratislava	Slovak	17	6	6	12	38	13	2	3	5	54
2003–04	HC Kladno	Czech	32	3	5	8	90	—	—	—	—	—
2003–04	HC Berounsti Medvedi	Czech2	2	2	0	2	6	—	—	—	—	—
2003–04	HC Slovan Bratislava	Slovak	10	1	0	1	10	12	3	1	4	16
2004–05	Neftekhimik Nizhnekamsk	Russia	2	0	1	1	6	—	—	—	—	—
2004–05	MsHK Zilina	Slovak	40	12	20	32	144	5	3	1	4	10
2005–06	HC Kosice	Slovak	52	24	13	37	222	8	2	1	3	30
2006–07	HC Kosice	Slovak	42	14	17	31	180	—	—	—	—	—
2006–07	HC Slovan Bratislava	Slovak	9	4	3	7	16	11	4	2	6	39
2007–08	HC Slovan Bratislava	Slovak	50	25	22	47	210	17	2	7	9	105
2008–09	HC Slovan Bratislava	Slovak	54	24	30	54	198	12	4	5	9	24
2009–10	HC Slovan Bratislava	Slovak	39	16	16	32	125	15	8	8	16	34
2010–11	Avtomobilist Yekaterinburg	KHL	19	2	3	5	14	—	—	—	—	—
2010–11	Sputnik Nizhny Tagil	VHL	7	2	3	5	31	—	—	—	—	—
2010–11	HC Banska Bystrica	Slovak	10	8	1	9	64	14	5	8	13	48
2011–12	Malmö Redhawks	Allsvenskan	44	3	4	7	56	—	—	—	—	—
2012–13	MsHK Zilina	Slovak	19	7	7	14	118	—	—	—	—	—
2012–13	HK 36 Skalica	Slovak	26	12	8	20	83	7	2	2	4	30
2013–14	HK 36 Skalica	Slovak	48	20	19	39	164	6	0	2	2	4
2013–14	HK Michalovce	Slovak2	—	—	—	—	—	4	0	2	2	31
Slovak totals			520	200	190	390	1,831	120	35	40	75	394
