= Marian Bazany =

Slovak-born German ice hockey player

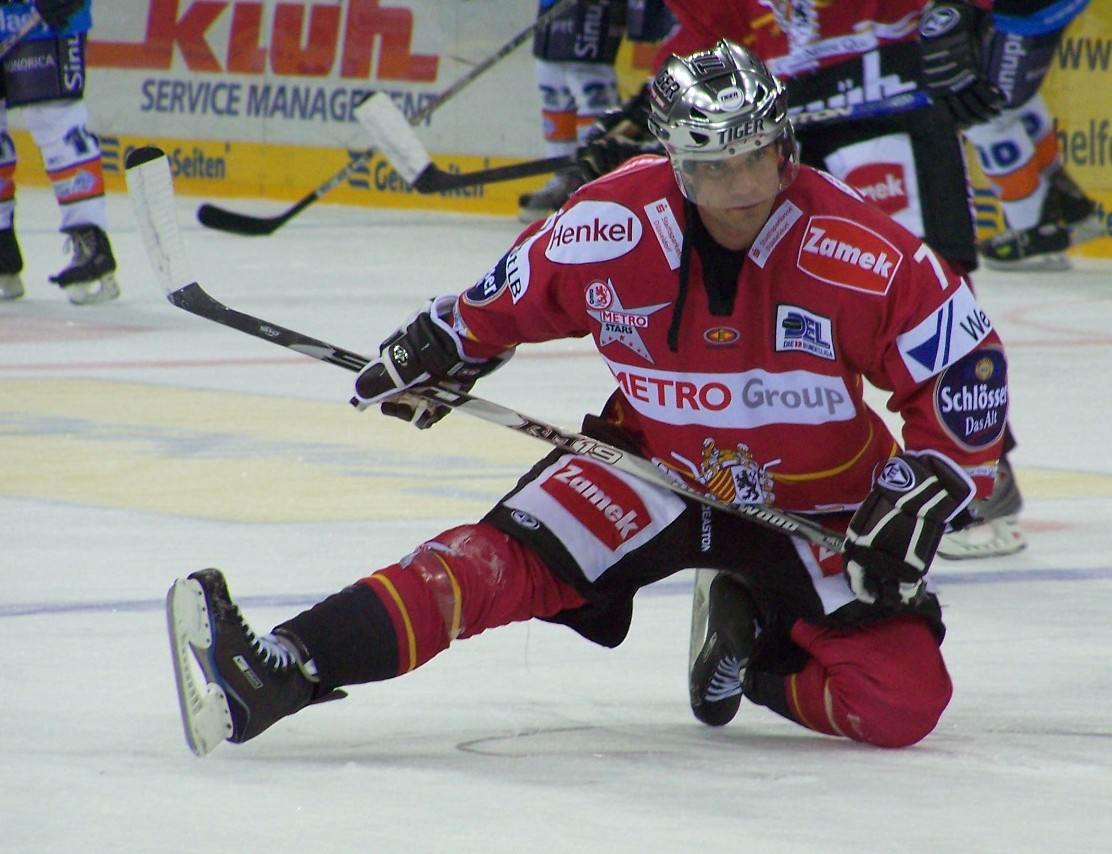
- Born: 9 May 1975 (age 51) Bratislava, Czechoslovakia
- Height: 6 ft 0 in (183 cm)
- Weight: 198 lb (90 kg; 14 st 2 lb)
- Position: Defence
- Shot: Right
- Played for: HC Slovan Bratislava; Düsseldorfer EG
- NHL draft: Undrafted
- Playing career: 1994–2013
- Coaching career: 2015–present

Marián Bažány (born 9 May 1975) is a Slovak-born German ice hockey coach and former professional ice hockey defenceman. As of 2026, he is an assistant coach for the Fischtown Pinguins of the Deutsche Eishockey Liga (DEL).

== Career statistics ==
			Regular season					Playoffs
Season	Team	League	GP	G	A	Pts	PIM	GP	G	A	Pts	PIM
1994–95	HC Slovan Bratislava	Slovak	25	1	3	4	4	5	0	0	0	2
1995–96	HC Dukla Senica	Slovak2	28	4	10	14	16	—	—	—	—	—
1996–97	ŠHK Danubia 96 Bratislava	Slovak2	45	4	6	10	62	—	—	—	—	—
1997–98	ŠHK Danubia 96 Bratislava	Slovak2	44	5	15	20	62	—	—	—	—	—
1998–99	HK Trnava	Slovak2	36	7	15	22	45	—	—	—	—	—
1999–00	HC Slovan Bratislava	Slovak	1	0	0	0	0	—	—	—	—	—
1999–00	HC Slovan Bratislava B	Slovak2	11	2	2	4	4	—	—	—	—	—
1999–00	TSV Peißenberg	Germany4	20	1	11	12	34	—	—	—	—	—
2000–01	TSV Peißenberg	Germany4	43	12	34	46	136	—	—	—	—	—
2000–01	Étoile Noire de Strasbourg	France2	—	3	12	15	—	—	—	—	—	—
2002–03	Eisbären Regensburg	Germany2	55	4	34	38	70	—	—	—	—	—
2003–04	Eisbären Regensburg	Germany2	47	4	18	22	52	5	0	2	2	8
2004–05	Eisbären Regensburg	Germany2	52	5	24	29	119	7	0	4	4	6
2005–06	DEG Metro Stars	DEL	52	1	11	12	80	14	0	0	0	14
2006–07	DEG Metro Stars	DEL	51	1	4	5	42	9	1	1	2	4
2007–08	DEG Metro Stars	DEL	56	5	13	18	56	10	1	0	1	16
2008–09	DEG Metro Stars	DEL	44	1	8	9	74	16	0	2	2	8
2009–10	DEG Metro Stars	DEL	55	2	16	18	40	3	0	1	1	4
2010–11	DEG Metro Stars	DEL	49	0	6	6	32	9	0	3	3	2
2011–12	DEG Metro Stars	DEL	52	0	11	11	52	7	0	1	1	10
2012–13	Düsseldorfer EG	DEL	30	1	2	3	48	—	—	—	—	—
DEL totals			389	11	71	82	424	68	2	8	10	58
