= Branislav Jánoš =

Slovak ice hockey player

- Born: January 8, 1971 (age 54); Trenčín, Czechoslovakia
- Height: 5 ft 9 in (175 cm)
- Weight: 179 lb (81 kg; 12 st 11 lb)
- Position: Left wing
- Shot: Left
- Played for: HK Dukla Trenčín; Brynäs IF; HC Zlín; HC Oceláři Třinec; EC Kapfenberg; HKm Zvolen; HC Slovan Bratislava; MsHK Žilina; HC Vítkovice; HC '05 Banská Bystrica; ŠHK 37 Piešťany; GKS Tychy
- National team: Czechoslovakia and Slovakia
- NHL draft: Undrafted
- Playing career: 1989–2017

Branislav Jánoš (born January 8, 1971) is a Slovak former professional ice hockey player.

He played in the Slovak Extraliga with HC Dukla Trenčín, HKm Zvolen, HC Slovan Bratislava, MsHK Žilina, HC '05 Banská Bystrica and ŠHK 37 Piešťany. He also played in the Czech Extraliga for HC Zlín, HC Oceláři Třinec and HC Vítkovice, as well as in the Swedish Elitserien for Brynas IF.

Jánoš was a member of the Slovakia national team for the 1994 and 1998 Winter Olympics.

== Career statistics ==
=== Regular season and playoffs ===
			Regular season					Playoffs
Season	Team	League	GP	G	A	Pts	PIM	GP	G	A	Pts	PIM
1989–90	ASVŠ Dukla Trenčín	TCH	21	3	3	6	—	—	—	—	—	—
1990–91	ASVŠ Dukla Trenčín	TCH	49	21	15	36	42	6	5	3	8	0
1991–92	ASVŠ Dukla Trenčín	TCH	38	21	25	46	—	12	7	11	18	—
1992–93	ASVŠ Dukla Trenčín	TCH	46	40	31	71	86	—	—	—	—	—
1993–94	Brynäs IF	SEL	15	2	2	4	10	—	—	—	—	—
1993–94	Gävle HF	SWE.2	7	2	8	10	4	—	—	—	—	—
1993–94	Dukla Trenčín	SVK	18	8	7	15	—	—	—	—	—	—
1994–95	Dukla Trenčín	SVK	34	22	16	38	96	9	3	4	7	8
1995–96	Dukla Trenčín	SVK	49	27	32	59	56	—	—	—	—	—
1996–97	Dukla Trenčín	SVK	52	33	45	78	121	—	—	—	—	—
1997–98	HC ZPS-Barum Zlín	ELH	49	19	17	36	58	10	5	3	8	6
1998–99	HC Železárny Třinec	ELH	27	3	13	16	28	10	5	3	8	6
1999–2000	HC Oceláři Třinec	ELH	52	18	23	41	69	4	0	2	2	27
2000–01	Kapfenberger SV	AUT	3	1	2	3	2	—	—	—	—	—
2000–01	HC Oceláři Třinec	ELH	47	22	22	44	66	—	—	—	—	—
2001–02	HC Oceláři Třinec	ELH	48	14	17	31	84	5	0	0	0	4
2002–03	HKm Zvolen	SVK	46	24	13	37	99	12	2	5	7	24
2003–04	HC Slovan Bratislava	SVK	48	22	25	47	52	—	—	—	—	—
2004–05	HC Slovan Bratislava	SVK	20	1	2	3	6	18	0	1	1	4
2004–05	HK Trnava	SVK.2	1	1	1	2	0	—	—	—	—	—
2005–06	HC Slovan Bratislava	SVK	52	12	22	34	118	3	0	0	0	16
2006–07	Lausitzer Füchse	GER.2	42	12	26	38	94	—	—	—	—	—
2007–08	MsHK Žilina a.s	SVK	37	10	19	29	54	—	—	—	—	—
2007–08	HC Vítkovice Steel	ELH	13	1	0	1	12	—	—	—	—	—
2008–09	HC ’05 Banská Bystrica	SVK	55	23	16	39	66	5	2	1	3	14
2009–10	HC ’05 Banská Bystrica	SVK	24	7	6	13	24	—	—	—	—	—
2009–10	Dukla Trenčín	SVK	23	10	17	27	46	—	—	—	—	—
2010–11	Dukla Trenčín	SVK	49	7	16	23	28	11	2	3	5	8
2011–12	ŠHK 37 Piešťany	SVK.2	42	15	25	40	52	14	4	7	11	33
2012–13	ŠHK 37 Piešťany	SVK	13	2	3	5	22	—	—	—	—	—
2012–13	GKS Tychy	POL	13	5	6	11	6	12	4	4	8	6
2013–14	MsHK Prievidza	SVK.2	14	8	6	14	28	—	—	—	—	—
2014–15	MsHK Prievidza	SVK.2	3	1	4	5	0	—	—	—	—	—
2014–15	ŠHK Púchov	SVK.3	1	2	5	7	0	—	—	—	—	—
2015–16	ŠHK Púchov	SVK.3	15	10	13	23	74	—	—	—	—	—
2016–17	MHK Dubnica nad Váhom	SVK.3	18	12	13	25	22	—	—	—	—	—
TCH totals			154	85	74	159	—	18	12	14	26	—
SVK totals			520	208	239	447	788	58	9	14	23	74
ELH totals			236	77	92	169	317	34	10	8	18	45

=== International ===
Year	Team	Event	GP	G	A	Pts	PIM
1989	Czechoslovakia	EJC
1991	Czechoslovakia	WJC	7	4	4	8	6
1994	Slovakia	OG	8	1	4	5	4
1994	Slovakia	WC C	6	5	7	12	12
1995	Slovakia	WC B	7	2	4	6	6
1996	Slovakia	WC	5	0	0	0	14
1997	Slovakia	WC	8	0	4	4	2
1998	Slovakia	OG	4	1	0	1	2
1998	Slovakia	WC	6	2	2	4	2
Senior totals			44	11	16	27	42
