= Rudolf Jendek =

Slovak ice hockey player

- Born: 8 April 1972 (age 53) Bratislava, Czechoslovakia
- Height: 6 ft 0 in (183 cm)
- Weight: 203 lb (92 kg; 14 st 7 lb)
- Position: Defenceman
- Shot: Left
- Played for: HC Slovan Bratislava; HC TWK Innsbruck; HK Nitra; HC Košice; HK 36 Skalica
- Playing career: 1995–2013

Rudolf Jendek (born 8 April 1972 in Bratislava) is a Slovak former professional ice hockey defenceman.

He played in the Slovak Extraliga for HC Slovan Bratislava, HK Nitra, HC Košice and HK 36 Skalica. He also played in the Austrian Hockey League for HC TWK Innsbruck.

Jendak has managed HK Martin and HC Slovan Bratislava.

== Career statistics ==
			Regular season					Playoffs
Season	Team	League	GP	G	A	Pts	PIM	GP	G	A	Pts	PIM
1995–96	HC Slovan Bratislava	Slovak	28	2	3	5	48	—	—	—	—	—
1995–96	HK 36 Skalica	Slovak2	20	0	3	3	10	—	—	—	—	—
1996–97	HC Slovan Bratislava	Slovak	40	4	3	7	32	—	—	—	—	—
1997–98	HC Slovan Bratislava	Slovak	46	1	11	12	68	—	—	—	—	—
1998–99	HC Slovan Bratislava	Slovak	40	0	6	6	26	—	—	—	—	—
1998–99	HK Trnava	Slovak2	1	0	0	0	0	—	—	—	—	—
1999–00	HC Slovan Bratislava	Slovak	50	3	2	5	50	8	0	2	2	33
1999–00	HC Slovan Bratislava B	Slovak2	3	0	1	1	8	—	—	—	—	—
2000–01	HC Slovan Bratislava	Slovak	56	1	11	12	70	6	0	1	1	8
2001–02	HC Innsbruck	Austria	19	2	1	3	24	4	0	0	0	6
2002–03	HC Slovan Bratislava	Slovak	54	3	5	8	64	13	0	0	0	8
2003–04	HC Slovan Bratislava	Slovak	45	1	4	5	30	12	0	1	1	21
2004–05	HC Slovan Bratislava	Slovak	54	5	5	10	110	18	2	2	4	50
2005–06	HC Slovan Bratislava	Slovak	50	4	11	15	101	3	0	0	0	6
2006–07	HK Nitra	Slovak	17	1	4	5	39	—	—	—	—	—
2006–07	HC Kosice	Slovak	36	1	11	12	54	9	0	6	6	14
2007–08	HC Kosice	Slovak	54	2	4	6	32	19	3	3	6	38
2008–09	HK 36 Skalica	Slovak	56	2	9	11	54	17	0	4	4	14
2009–10	HK 36 Skalica	Slovak	47	4	10	14	64	7	1	0	1	6
2010–11	HC Slovan Bratislava	Slovak	55	1	9	10	48	3	0	0	0	0
2011–12	HO Hamikovo	Slovak3	2	0	0	0	4	—	—	—	—	—
2012–13	HO Hamikovo	Slovak3	2	0	2	2	2	—	—	—	—	—
Slovak totals			728	35	108	143	890	115	6	19	25	198
