= Daniel Hančák =

Slovak ice hockey player

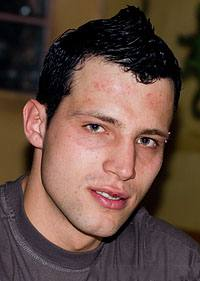
- Slovak professional ice hockey player
- Born: January 3, 1984 (age 42) Spišská Nová Ves, Czechoslovakia
- Height: 6 ft 2 in (188 cm)
- Weight: 216 lb (98 kg; 15 st 6 lb)
- Position: Defence
- Shoots: Left
- Slovak 2. Liga team Former teams: HK 2016 Trebišov; HC Slovan Bratislava; HK Ružinov; HC Dukla Senica; HK Trnava; MHC Martin; HK Dukla Trenčín; HK Spišská Nová Ves; HK Dukla Michalovce; Arlan Kokshetau
- Playing career: 2001–present

Daniel Hančák (born January 3, 1984) is a Slovak professional ice hockey player. He currently plays for HK 2016 Trebišov of the Slovak 2. Liga.

Hančák previously played for HC Slovan Bratislava MHC Martin, HK Dukla Trenčín and Arlan Kokshetau.

== Career statistics ==
=== Regular season and playoffs ===
			Regular season					Playoffs
Season	Team	League	GP	G	A	Pts	PIM	GP	G	A	Pts	PIM
