= Roman Tvrdoň =

Slovak ice hockey player

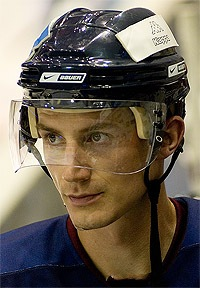
- Tvrdoň in 2006
- Born: January 29, 1981 (age 45) Trenčín, Czechoslovakia
- Height: 6 ft 2 in (188 cm)
- Weight: 187 lb (85 kg; 13 st 5 lb)
- Position: Center
- Shot: Left
- Played for: Washington Capitals; Nottingham Panthers; Plzen HC; Bratislava Slovan; Zilina HK-SKP; Skalica HK 36; Metallurg Zhlobin; Dukla Trencin; HK Kompanion Kyiv; Považská Bystrica; TH Unia Oświęcim; Guildford Flames; SHK 37 Piestany; Landshut EV
- National team: Slovakia
- NHL draft: 132nd overall, 1999; Washington Capitals
- Playing career: 2001–2017

Roman Tvrdoň (born 29 January 1981) is a Slovak former professional ice hockey player. He played 9 games in the National Hockey League with the Washington Capitals, who had selected him in the 1999 NHL entry draft. The rest of his career, which lasted from 2001 to 2017, was mainly spent in Europe, primarily in the Slovak Extraliga.

== Career statistics ==
=== Regular season and playoffs ===
			Regular season					Playoffs
Season	Team	League	GP	G	A	Pts	PIM	GP	G	A	Pts	PIM
1995–96	HK Dukla Trencin U18	SVK U18	46	25	15	40	32	—	—	—	—	—
1996–97	HK Dukla Trencin U18	SVK U18	42	25	13	38	10	—	—	—	—	—
1997–98	HK Dukla Trencin U20	SVK U20	48	4	12	16	39	—	—	—	—	—
1998–99	HK Dukla Trencin U20	SVK U20	49	23	23	46	20	—	—	—	—	—
1999–00	Spokane Chiefs	WHL	69	26	44	70	40	15	4	7	11	16
2000–01	Spokane Chiefs	WHL	62	28	34	62	55	12	5	11	16	0
2001–02	Portland Pirates	AHL	49	5	9	14	22	—	—	—	—	—
2002–03	Portland Pirates	AHL	35	5	4	9	17	—	—	—	—	—
2003–04	Washington Capitals	NHL	9	0	1	1	2	—	—	—	—	—
2003–04	Portland Pirates	AHL	51	2	4	6	20	7	0	0	0	2
2004–05	Nottingham Panthers	EIHL	9	2	5	7	6	—	—	—	—	—
2005–06	Plzen HC	CZE	39	6	3	9	20	—	—	—	—	—
2006–07	Bratislava Slovan	SVK	50	5	14	19	18	10	0	1	1	2
2007–08	Zilina HK-SKP	SVK	38	6	8	14	48	4	1	0	1	2
2008-09	Metallurg Zhlobin	BLR	24	13	10	23	14	7	4	3	7	4
2008–09	SHK 37 Piestany	SVK-2	11	3	7	10	4	—	—	—	—	—
2009–10	Metallurg Zhlobin	BLR	22	5	7	12	12	—	—	—	—	—
2009–10	SHK 37 Piestany	SVK-2	1	0	0	0	0	—	—	—	—	—
2010–11	Skalica HK 36	SVK	11	6	4	10	6	—	—	—	—	—
2010–11	Dukla Trencin	SVK	36	10	16	26	22	10	1	5	6	6
2010-11	SHK 37 Piestany	SVK-2	7	2	3	5	4	—	—	—	—	—
2011–12	Dukla Trencin	SVK	51	13	21	34	44	10	1	2	3	10
2012–13	HK Kompanion Kyiv	UKR	33	19	9	28	34	12	1	3	4	4
2013-14	Považská Bystrica	SVK-2	9	1	4	5	20	—	—	—	—	—
2013-14	TH Unia Oświęcim	POL	21	12	9	21	10	14	3	7	8
2014–15	Guildford Flames	EIHL	25	14	12	26	53	2	1	2	3	2
2015–16	SHK 37 Piestany	SVK	27	3	4	7	8	8	1	0	1	4
2016–17	EV Landshut	GER-2	35	9	11	20	28	3	0	0	4
SVK totals			213	43	67	110	146	42	4	8	12	24
NHL totals			9	0	1	1	2	—	—	—	—	—

=== International ===
Year	Team	Event	GP	G	A	Pts	PIM
1999	Slovakia	U18	7	1	5	6	4
2001	Slovakia	WJC	7	2	0	2	4
Junior totals			14	3	5	8	8
