= Michal Kokavec =

Slovak ice hockey player

- Born: 1 March 1983 (age 42) Žilina, Czechoslovakia
- Height: 1.95 m (6 ft 5 in)
- Weight: 102 kg (225 lb; 16 st 1 lb)
- Position: Left wing
- Shot: Left
- Played for: Slovan Bratislava; HK 36 Skalica; MsHK Žilina; HC '05 Banská Bystrica; Arystan Temirtau; HC Almaty; KS Cracovia; MHC Martin; HK Dubnica
- Playing career: 2003–2020

Michal Kokavec (born 1 March 1983) is a Slovak retired ice hockey player.

He previously played in the Slovak Extraliga for Slovan Bratislava, HK 36 Skalica, MsHK Žilina, HC '05 Banská Bystrica and MHC Martin.

== Career statistics ==
			Regular season					Playoffs
Season	Team	League	GP	G	A	Pts	PIM	GP	G	A	Pts	PIM
2001–02	Erie Otters	OHL	66	7	7	14	49	21	0	0	0	4
2002–03	HC Ocelari Trinec U20	Czech U20	32	19	16	35	48	—	—	—	—	—
2002–03	HC Slovan Bratislava U20	Slovak U20	8	3	3	6	9	8	4	2	6	20
2002–03	HC Slovan Bratislava	Slovak	3	0	0	0	2	—	—	—	—	—
2003–04	HC Slovan Bratislava	Slovak	28	3	1	4	26	12	0	0	0	4
2004–05	HC Slovan Bratislava	Slovak	51	5	4	9	34	16	0	0	0	8
2004–05	HK Trnava	Slovak2	2	0	1	1	2	—	—	—	—	—
2005–06	HK 36 Skalica	Slovak	16	2	3	5	18	—	—	—	—	—
2005–06	MsHK Žilina	Slovak	33	3	7	10	24	17	3	0	3	37
2006–07	HC Slovan Bratislava	Slovak	42	13	8	21	85	11	0	0	0	4
2007–08	HC Slovan Bratislava	Slovak	51	3	3	6	14	10	1	0	1	4
2007–08	HK Ružinov 99 Bratislava	Slovak2	5	2	0	2	38	—	—	—	—	—
2008–09	MsHK Žilina	Slovak	52	9	16	25	40	—	—	—	—	—
2009–10	MsHK Žilina	Slovak	46	11	11	22	42	—	—	—	—	—
2010–11	MsHK Žilina	Slovak	54	16	16	32	44	—	—	—	—	—
2011–12	HC Banská Bystrica	Slovak	50	8	8	16	56	5	1	0	1	16
2012–13	MsHK Žilina	Slovak	46	9	13	22	101	—	—	—	—	—
2013–14	Arystan Temirtau	Kazakhstan	48	18	15	33	34	7	1	1	2	4
2014–15	HK Almaty	Kazakhstan	8	1	0	1	14	—	—	—	—	—
2014–15	MsHK Žilina	Slovak	13	0	1	1	2	—	—	—	—	—
2014–15	Cracovia Krakow	Poland	6	0	0	0	4	2	0	0	0	0
2015–16	MHC Martin	Slovak	39	1	8	9	24	—	—	—	—	—
2015–16	Hannover Indians	Germany3	5	2	7	9	6	—	—	—	—	—
2016–17	HC Prešov 07	Slovak2	44	32	29	61	86	7	2	1	3	29
2017–18	HK 95 Považská Bystrica	Slovak2	2	2	1	3	0	—	—	—	—	—
2017–18	MHK Dubnica nad Váhom	Slovak2	26	9	16	25	30	3	1	1	2	6
2018–19	MHK Dubnica nad Váhom	Slovak2	42	33	29	62	88	5	3	0	3	46
2019–20	MHK Dubnica nad Váhom	Slovak2	20	8	11	19	26	—	—	—	—	—
2019–20	MsHK Žilina	Slovak2	12	3	7	10	45	—	—	—	—	—
Slovak totals			524	83	99	182	512	75	5	0	5	73
