= Tomáš Troliga =

Slovak ice hockey player

- Born: April 24, 1984 (age 40); Prešov, Czechoslovakia
- Height: 6 ft 5 in (196 cm)
- Weight: 225 lb (102 kg; 16 st 1 lb)
- Position: Forward
- Shot: Right
- Slovak Extraliga team: HK SKP Poprad
- NHL draft: 89th overall, 2002; St. Louis Blues
- Playing career: 2000–2017

Tomáš Troliga (born 24 April 1984) is a Slovak professional ice hockey player who played with HK SKP Poprad in the Slovak Extraliga during the 2010–11 season.

== Career statistics ==
=== Regular season and playoffs ===
| | | | Regular season | | | | | Playoffs |
| Season | Team | League | GP | G | A | Pts | PIM | GP | G | A | Pts | PIM |
|---|---|---|---|---|---|---|---|---|---|---|---|---|
| 2000–01 | HK VTJ Farmakol Prešov | SVK.2 | 7 | 1 | 0 | 1 | 8 | — | — | — | — | — |
| 2001–02 | HK VTJ Farmakol Prešov | SVK.2 | 6 | 0 | 1 | 1 | 0 | — | — | — | — | — |
| 2002–03 | HC Košice | SVK | 29 | 1 | 1 | 2 | 16 | — | — | — | — | — |
| 2002–03 | Martinskeho Hokeja Club | SVK | 11 | 1 | 2 | 3 | 18 | 4 | 0 | 0 | 0 | 6 |
| 2003–04 | Calgary Hitmen | WHL | 59 | 11 | 23 | 34 | 103 | 7 | 0 | 1 | 1 | 16 |
| 2004–05 | MsHK Žilina | SVK | 9 | 0 | 0 | 0 | 6 | — | — | — | — | — |
| 2004–05 | PHK Prešov | SVK.2 | 2 | 1 | 1 | 2 | 8 | — | — | — | — | — |
| 2004–05 | Tri–City Storm | USHL | 43 | 10 | 26 | 36 | 98 | 9 | 0 | 2 | 2 | 24 |
| 2005–06 | HK Lietajúce kone Prešov | SVK.2 | 16 | 8 | 11 | 19 | 60 | 5 | 0 | 0 | 0 | 18 |
| 2006–07 | MHC Martin | SVK | 12 | 0 | 0 | 0 | 4 | — | — | — | — | — |
| 2006–07 | HK Lietajúce kone Prešov | SVK.2 | 33 | 26 | 28 | 54 | 102 | 5 | 2 | 4 | 6 | 4 |
| 2008–09 | HC 07 Prešov | SVK.2 | 26 | 8 | 10 | 18 | 45 | 7 | 3 | 6 | 9 | 6 |
| 2009–10 | Dukla Trenčín | SVK | 29 | 0 | 4 | 4 | 30 | — | — | — | — | — |
| 2009–10 | HC 07 Prešov | SVK.2 | 13 | 5 | 5 | 10 | 24 | 15 | 2 | 10 | 12 | 64 |
| 2010–11 | HK Poprad | SVK | 25 | 0 | 3 | 3 | 14 | — | — | — | — | — |
| 2010–11 | MsHK DOXXbet Žilina | SVK | 31 | 4 | 2 | 6 | 34 | — | — | — | — | — |
| 2011–12 | MsHK DOXXbet Žilina | SVK | 36 | 2 | 5 | 7 | 36 | 5 | 0 | 0 | 0 | 22 |
| 2011–12 | HC 07 Prešov | SVK.2 | 4 | 1 | 1 | 2 | 2 | — | — | — | — | — |
| 2012–13 | MsHK DOXXbet Žilina | SVK | 45 | 6 | 14 | 20 | 89 | — | — | — | — | — |
| 2013–14 | HK Dukla Trenčín | SVK | 46 | 13 | 11 | 24 | 78 | — | — | — | — | — |
| 2014–15 | Mountfield HK | ELH | 23 | 1 | 5 | 6 | 34 | 1 | 0 | 1 | 1 | 0 |
| 2014–15 | HC Rebel Havlíčkův Brod | CZE.2 | 21 | 5 | 4 | 9 | 48 | — | — | — | — | — |
| 2015–16 | Mountfield HK | ELH | 10 | 1 | 1 | 2 | 0 | — | — | — | — | — |
| 2015–16 | HC Stadion Litoměřice | CZE.2 | 18 | 4 | 9 | 13 | 48 | — | — | — | — | — |
| 2015–16 | HK Dukla Trenčín | SVK | 18 | 3 | 2 | 5 | 39 | 5 | 0 | 1 | 1 | 0 |
| 2016–17 | HK Poprad | SVK | 53 | 9 | 13 | 22 | 42 | 4 | 0 | 0 | 0 | 8 |
| SVK.2 totals | | | 107 | 50 | 57 | 107 | 249 | 32 | 7 | 20 | 27 | 92 |
| SVK totals | | | 344 | 39 | 57 | 96 | 406 | 18 | 0 | 1 | 1 | 36 |

=== International ===
| Year | Team | Event | GP | G | A | Pts | PIM |
|---|---|---|---|---|---|---|---|
| 2002 | Slovakia | WJC18 | 8 | 1 | 2 | 3 | 31 |
| 2003 | Slovakia | WJC | 6 | 0 | 1 | 1 | 4 |
| 2004 | Slovakia | WJC | 6 | 1 | 1 | 2 | 12 |
| Junior totals | | | 20 | 2 | 4 | 6 | 47 |
