= 2007–08 Slovak 1. Liga season =

Slovak ice hockey league season

The 2007–08 Slovak 1.Liga season was the 15th season of the Slovak 1. Liga, the second level of ice hockey in Slovakia. 15 teams participated in the league, and HC 05 Banska Bystrica won the championship.

== Regular season ==
| | Club | GP | W | OTW | OTL | L | Goals | Pts |
|---|---|---|---|---|---|---|---|---|
| 1. | HK Spišská Nová Ves | 42 | 28 | 5 | 2 | 7 | 172:80 | 96 |
| 2. | HC 05 Banská Bystrica | 42 | 29 | 4 | 1 | 8 | 165:97 | 96 |
| 3. | HK Ružinov 99 Bratislava | 42 | 23 | 5 | 3 | 11 | 161:118 | 82 |
| 4. | HC Dukla Senica | 42 | 24 | 3 | 2 | 13 | 163:119 | 80 |
| 5. | HK Trnava | 42 | 23 | 3 | 4 | 12 | 151:119 | 79 |
| 6. | HC 07 Prešov | 42 | 21 | 3 | 5 | 13 | 136:114 | 74 |
| 7. | HK 95 Považská Bystrica | 42 | 24 | 0 | 1 | 17 | 154:147 | 73 |
| 8. | HK VTJ Trebišov | 42 | 19 | 3 | 1 | 19 | 139:133 | 64 |
| 9. | ŠHK 37 Piešťany | 42 | 17 | 4 | 2 | 19 | 157:142 | 61 |
| 10. | MšHK Prievidza | 42 | 18 | 2 | 1 | 21 | 130:147 | 59 |
| 11. | HC 46 Bardejov | 42 | 17 | 1 | 3 | 21 | 136:151 | 56 |
| 12. | HK FTC Nové Zámky | 42 | 17 | 1 | 2 | 22 | 159:170 | 55 |
| 13. | MHK Dolný Kubín | 42 | 12 | 0 | 4 | 26 | 115:169 | 40 |
| 14. | HC Topoľčany | 42 | 9 | 2 | 5 | 26 | 140:189 | 36 |
| 15. | HKm Detva | 42 | 4 | 1 | 1 | 36 | 72:255 | 15 |

== Pre-Playoffs ==
- HK Trnava – HK FTC Nové Zámky 3:0 (5:1, 3:1, 5:2)
- HC 07 Prešov – HC 46 Bardejov 3:2 (3:2, 2:3, 2:3 n.P., 3:1, 3:1)
- HK 95 Považská Bystrica – MšHK Prievidza 3:2 (0:2, 7:3, 3:1, 5:6, 4:0)
- HK VTJ Trebišov – ŠHK 37 Piešťany 1:3 (2:6, 3:2 n.P., 3:4 n.P., 3:4 n.V.)

== Playoffs ==
=== Quarterfinals ===
- HK Spišská Nová Ves – ŠHK 37 PATRÍCIA Piešťany 4:0 (3:0, 6:2, 7:4, 8:2)
- HC ’05 Banská Bystrica – HK 95 Považská Bystrica 4:1 (9:1, 6:2, 0:1, 2:1sn, 7:1)
- HK Ružinov 99 Bratislava – HK Lietajúce Kone Prešov 3:4 (3:2, 3:4PP, 2:7, 2:4, 3:0, 3:2sn, 2:3)
- HC Dukla Senica – HK Trnava 3:4 (0:2, 2:5, 4:3sn, 1:5, 1:0, 3:2sn, 1:3)

=== Semifinals ===
- HK Spišská Nová Ves – HK Lietajúce Kone Prešov 4:1 (3:2, 2:1sn, 2:1, 2:3, 2:1)
- HC ’05 Banská Bystrica – HK Trnava 4:0 (3:2PP, 5:1, 2:1, 5:2)

=== Final ===
- HK Spišská Nová Ves – HC ’05 Banská Bystrica 1:4 (2:3PP, 1:4, 4:3, 1:3, 0:1)
