= 2006–07 Slovak 1. Liga season =

Slovak ice hockey league season

The 2006–07 Slovak 1.Liga season was the 14th season of the Slovak 1. Liga, the second level of ice hockey in Slovakia. 16 teams participated in the league, and MHK Kezmarok won the championship.

== Regular season ==
	Club	GP	W	OTW	OTL	L	Goals	Pts
1.	HK Spišská Nová Ves	44	36	1	2	5	212:81	112
2.	MHK Kežmarok	44	35	2	1	6	240:89	110
3.	HK Lietajúce kone Prešov	44	32	2	1	9	193:94	101
4.	HC 05 Banská Bystrica	44	28	5	1	10	174:95	95
5.	HK 95 Považská Bystrica	44	26	2	2	14	188:152	84
6.	HC VTJ Topoľčany	44	25	1	1	17	167:164	78
7.	ŠHK 37 Piešťany	44	23	2	2	17	184:132	75
8.	HC Dukla Senica	44	23	1	0	20	167:160	71
9.	HK Ružinov 99 Bratislava	44	19	2	2	21	177:163	63
10.	HK Trnava	44	17	3	3	21	138:144	60
11.	HKM Humenné	44	15	2	7	20	132:169	56
12.	HK Lokomotíva Nové Zámky	44	13	1	0	30	127:199	41
13.	MHK Ružomberok	44	9	3	1	31	114:223	34
14.	HKm Detva	44	8	2	4	30	104:206	32
15.	HK VTJ Trebišov	44	7	1	1	35	99:218	24
16.	MšHK Prievidza	44	5	1	3	35	114:241	20

== Pre-Playoffs ==
- HK 95 Považská Bystrica – HK Lokomotíva Nové Zámky 3:0 (3:0, 3:2, 5:4 n.P.)
- HC VTJ Topoľčany – HKM Humenné 3:2 (6:3, 4:1, 3:4 n.P., 3:8, 8:3)
- ŠHK 37 Piešťany – HK Trnava 3:0 (5:4, 5:1, 4:3)
- HC Dukla Senica – HK Ružinov 99 Bratislava 1:3 (3:4 n.V., 3:1, 5:6, 2:3)

== Playoffs ==
=== Quarterfinals ===
- HK Spišská Nová Ves – HK Ružinov 99 Bratislava 4:0 (8:1, 5:2, 7:2, 5:3)
- MHK SkiPark Kežmarok – ŠHK 37 Piešťany 4:0 (4:0, 3:2, 4:1, 1:0)
- HK Lietajúce Kone Prešov – HC VTJ Topoľčany 1:4 (9:3, 0:2, 3:4, 1:2PP, 3:4sn)
- HC ’05 Banská Bystrica – HK 95 Považská Bystrica 4:0 (8:0, 4:0, 4:3, 7:1)

=== Semifinals ===
- HK Spišská Nová Ves – HC VTJ Topoľčany 4:1 (3:4PP, 4:1, 5:1, 10:3, 3:0)
- MHK SkiPark Kežmarok – HC ’05 Banská Bystrica 4:0 (5:2, 6:2, 6:2, 3:2PP)

=== Final ===
- HK Spišská Nová Ves – MHK SkiPark Kežmarok 2:4 (1:5, 2:1, 2:6, 2:1, 0:4, 2:3)
