= Michal Macho =

Slovak ice hockey player

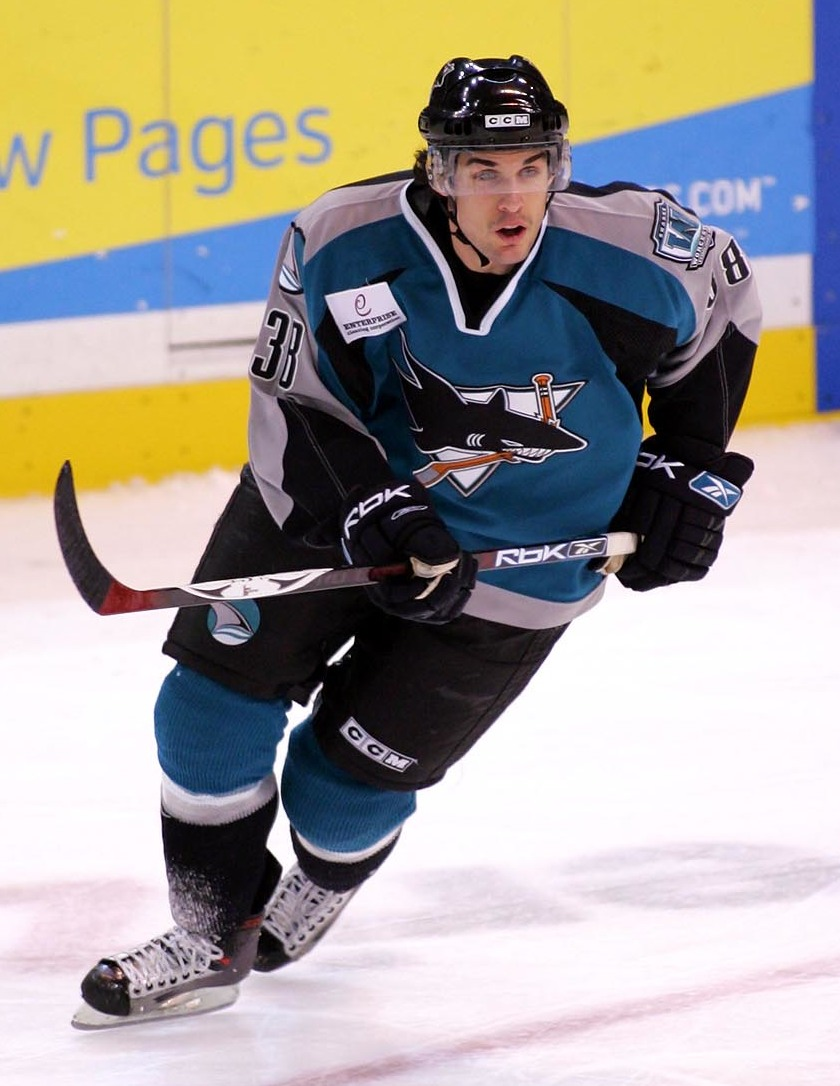
- Macho with the Worcester Sharks in 2006
- Born: 17 January 1982 (age 44) Martin, Czechoslovakia
- Height: 6 ft 1 in (185 cm)
- Weight: 202 lb (92 kg; 14 st 6 lb)
- Position: Centre
- Shot: Right
- Played for: MHA Martin; HC Slovan Bratislava; Worcester Sharks; BK Mladá Boleslav
- National team: Slovakia
- NHL draft: 183rd overall, 2000; San Jose Sharks
- Playing career: 2000–2015

Michal Macho (born January 17, 1982) is a Slovak former professional ice hockey player who last played with MHA Martin in the Slovak Extraliga. He was selected by the San Jose Sharks in the 6th round (183rd overall) of the 2000 NHL entry draft.

== Career statistics ==
=== Regular season and playoffs ===
			Regular season					Playoffs
Season	Team	League	GP	G	A	Pts	PIM	GP	G	A	Pts	PIM
1999–2000	Martinskeho hokeja club	SVK.2	8	1	5	6	4	—	—	—	—	—
2000–01	Martinskeho hokeja club	SVK	37	5	10	15	12	—	—	—	—	—
2001–02	Martinskeho hokeja club	SVK	40	12	8	20	20	—	—	—	—	—
2002–03	HC Slovan Bratislava	SVK	51	5	4	9	26	—	—	—	—	—
2003–04	HC Slovan Bratislava	SVK	33	7	7	14	14	—	—	—	—	—
2004–05	HC Slovan Bratislava	SVK	44	8	20	28	14	12	0	0	0	2
2005–06	HC Slovan Bratislava	SVK	48	10	5	15	10	4	0	0	0	0
2006–07	Worcester Sharks	AHL	27	1	6	7	10	—	—	—	—	—
2007–08	HC Košice	SVK	12	0	2	2	4	—	—	—	—	—
2007–08	HK VTJ Trebišov	SVK.2	1	0	2	2	2	—	—	—	—	—
2007–08	MHC Martin	SVK	34	15	18	33	36	7	0	4	4	2
2007–08	MHK Dolný Kubín	SVK.2	1	0	2	2	0	—	—	—	—	—
2008–09	MHC Martin	SVK	51	17	39	56	26	5	1	2	3	8
2009–10	BK Mladá Boleslav	ELH	50	14	19	33	26	—	—	—	—	—
2010–11	BK Mladá Boleslav	ELH	31	5	5	10	8	—	—	—	—	—
2011–12	HC Slovan Bratislava	SVK	33	3	8	11	12	—	—	—	—	—
2012–13	Saryarka Karagandy	VHL	46	9	7	16	10	19	2	6	8	8
2013–14	Saryarka Karagandy	VHL	50	17	20	37	20	19	4	9	13	10
2014–15	Buran Voronezh	VHL	19	2	4	6	4	—	—	—	—	—
2014–15	MHC Mountfield Martin	SVK	3	0	0	0	0	4	0	2	2	8
SVK totals			386	82	121	203	174	32	1	8	9	20
VHL totals			115	28	31	59	34	38	6	15	21	18

=== International ===
Year	Team	Event	GP	G	A	Pts	PIM
2000	Slovakia	WJC18	4	1	0	1	2
2002	Slovakia	WJC	7	0	2	2	6
2009	Slovakia	WC	1	0	0	0	0
2010	Slovakia	WC	6	0	0	0	0
Junior totals			11	1	2	3	8
Senior totals			7	0	0	0	0
