= Patrik Lušňák =

Slovak ice hockey player

- Born: November 6, 1988 (age 36); Piešťany, Czechoslovakia
- Height: 5 ft 11 in (180 cm)
- Weight: 187 lb (85 kg; 13 st 5 lb)
- Position: Left wing
- Shoots: Left
- team Former teams: Free agent ŠHK 37 Piešťany; HK 36 Skalica; Sudbury Wolves; HC Oceláři Třinec; HC Havířov; Piráti Chomutov; HC Kometa Brno; Yunost Minsk; HC Slovan Bratislava; HKM Zvolen; HC Košice; HK Nitra; HK Poprad; HC Topoľčany
- National team: Slovakia
- NHL draft: Undrafted
- Playing career: 2005–present

Patrik Lušňák (born November 6, 1988) is a Slovak professional ice hockey player. He is currently a free agent.

== Playing career ==
Lušňák was playing junior ice hockey in ŠHK 37 Piešťany and HC Dukla Senica. He debuted at senior level in the 2005–06 season for ŠHK 37 Piešťany. He recorded 10 points in 10 games in 2005–06. In the next season he moved to North America to play for the OHL club Sudbury Wolves. He overall played 160 games and recorded 135 points for Sudbury.

In 2009 he came back to Europe, signing for the Czech Extraliga team HC Oceláři Třinec. He played 17 games and scored 2 goals for Třinec. In 2009 he joined HK 36 Skalica and stayed for three seasons before returning to the Czech Extraliga in 2012 with Piráti Chomutov. He returned to Slovakia the following year and signed for ŠHK 37 Piešťany before moving to the Belarusian Extraleague for Yunost Minsk.

In 2015, Lušňák moved to HC Slovan Bratislava of the Kontinental Hockey League. After two seasons he returned to Slovakia with HKm Zvolen and then with HC Košice.

== International play ==
Lušňák participated at the 2008 World Junior Ice Hockey Championships, recording 5 points in 6 games. The Slovakia junior team finished 7th at the tournament. He debuted for the Slovakia senior team at the Deutschland Cup in 2011.

== Career statistics ==
=== Regular season and playoffs ===
			Regular season					Playoffs
Season	Team	League	GP	G	A	Pts	PIM	GP	G	A	Pts	PIM
2004–05	ŠHK 37 Piešťany	Slovak-Jr.	33	7	6	13	24	—	—	—	—	—
2005–06	HK Skalica	Slovak-Jr.	43	23	23	46	65	8	3	4	7	2
2005–06	ŠHK 37 Piešťany	Slovak-Jr.1	1	0	1	1	10	—	—	—	—	—
2005–06	ŠHK 37 Piešťany	Slovak.1	10	5	5	10	4	—	—	—	—	—
2006–07	Sudbury Wolves	OHL	67	17	25	42	33	21	3	4	7	8
2007–08	Sudbury Wolves	OHL	58	20	39	59	56	—	—	—	—	—
2008–09	Sudbury Wolves	OHL	35	20	14	34	14	—	—	—	—	—
2008–09	HC Oceláři Třinec	Czech	17	2	0	2	0	1	0	0	0	2
2008–09	HC Havířov	Czech.1	1	0	2	2	0	4	1	0	1	2
2009–10	HK Skalica	Slovak	43	10	8	18	22	7	0	0	0	4
2010–11	HK Skalica	Slovak	54	13	14	27	24	—	—	—	—	—
2010–11	ŠHK 37 Piešťany	Slovak.1	4	2	2	4	0	—	—	—	—	—
2011–12	HK Skalica	Slovak	55	26	19	45	22	6	2	0	2	4
2012–13	Piráti Chomutov	Czech	42	8	5	13	18	—	—	—	—	—
2012–13	HC Kometa Brno	Czech	8	2	1	3	2	—	—	—	—	—
2013–14	ŠHK 37 Piešťany	Slovak	56	21	9	30	50	11	2	1	3	4
2014–15	Yunost Minsk	BHL	53	19	29	48	31	12	6	8	14	4
2015–16	HC Slovan Bratislava	KHL	55	4	3	7	18	4	0	0	0	2
2016–17	HC Slovan Bratislava	KHL	60	7	7	14	20	—	—	—	—	—
2016–17	HKM Zvolen	Slovak	6	3	1	4	32	7	2	6	8	2
2017–18	Did not play		—					—
2018–19	HKM Zvolen	Slovak	29	5	8	13	14	—	—	—	—	—
2018–19	HC Košice	Slovak	22	3	2	5	8	2	0	0	0	2
2019–20	HK Nitra	Slovak	51	7	7	14	10	—	—	—	—	—
2020–21	HK Poprad	Slovak	4	1	0	1	0	—	—	—	—	—
2020–21	HK Skalica	Slovak.1	6	3	4	7	2	—	—	—	—	—
2020–21	HC Topoľčany	Slovak.1	22	8	7	15	6	4	0	0	0	4
KHL totals			115	10	11	21	38	4	0	0	0	2
Czech totals			67	12	6	18	20	1	0	0	0	2
Slovak totals			320	89	68	157	182	33	6	7	13	16

=== International ===
Year	Team	Event	Result	GP	G	A	Pts	PIM
