= 2012–13 Slovak 1. Liga season =

Slovak ice hockey league season

The 2012–13 Slovak 1.Liga season was the 20th season of the Slovak 1. Liga, the second level of ice hockey in Slovakia. 12 teams participated in the league, and HC 46 Bardejov won the championship.

== Regular season ==
	Club	GP	W	OTW	OTL	L	Goals	Pts
1.	HC Dukla Senica	45	31	5	1	8	194:123	104
2.	HC 46 Bardejov	45	27	1	8	9	168:109	91
3.	HC Dukla Michalovce	45	27	2	5	11	217:136	90
4.	HK Spišská Nová Ves	45	27	2	3	13	169:105	88
5.	HC 07 Prešov	45	25	4	4	12	168:112	87
6.	MHk 32 Liptovský Mikuláš	45	24	3	1	17	183:159	79
7.	HC Topoľčany	45	17	4	4	20	166:160	63
8.	HC 07 Detva	45	17	3	3	22	146:158	60
9.	HK Trnava	45	13	7	4	21	119:154	57
10.	HK 95 Považská Bystrica	45	12	1	0	32	117:212	38
11.	HK Trebišov	45	9	2	2	32	119:219	33
12.	MšHK Prievidza	45	7	3	4	31	101:200	31
	HK Orange	12	1	2	0	9	20:40	7

== Playoffs ==
Quarter-finals
HC 46 Bardejov	3
HC Topoľčany	0
HC Dukla Senica	1
HC 07 Detva	3
HC Dukla Michalovce	3
MHk 32 Liptovský Mikuláš	2
HK Spišská Nová Ves	2
HC 07 Prešov	3

Semi-finals
HC 46 Bardejov	3
HC 07 Detva	0
HK Dukla Michalovce	3
HC 07 Prešov	1

Final
HC 46 Bardejov	4
HC Dukla Michalovce	0

== Playouts ==
	Club	GP	W	OTW	OTL	L	Goals	Pts
9.	HK Trnava	18	8	2	2	6	64:61	30
10.	HK 95 Považská Bystrica	18	9	1	0	8	72:70	29
11.	MšHK Prievidza	18	6	2	4	6	64:68	26
12.	HK Trebišov	18	5	3	2	8	69:70	23

== Relegation ==
- HK Trebišov - MŠK Hviezda D. Kubín 4:2 (3:1, 2:3, 4:6, 3:2 SO, 4:2, 5:2)
