= Tomáš Klíma =

Slovak ice hockey player

- Born: June 13, 1990 (age 35) Ilava, Czechoslovakia
- Height: 6 ft 0 in (183 cm)
- Weight: 189 lb (86 kg; 13 st 7 lb)
- Position: Centre
- Shoots: Left
- Slovak 1. Liga team Former teams: HK DOXXbet Detva; HC Litvínov; HK Dukla Trenčín; HC Dukla Senica; HC Karlovy Vary; SK Kadaň; HC Most; MHC Martin; HKM Zvolen; HC Košice; MHK Humenné; HC 07 Detva; HK 32 Liptovský Mikuláš; HC Prešov
- Playing career: 2010–present

Tomáš Klíma (born June 13, 1990) is a Slovak professional ice hockey centre currently playing for HK DOXXbet Detva of the TIPOS Slovenská hokejová liga.

He is the twin brother of Lukáš Klíma and the nephew of former NHL player Petr Klíma.

== Career ==
Klíma made his professional debut with HK Dukla Trenčín of the Tipsport Liga during the 2009–10 season. He then joined HC Karlovy Vary in the Czech Extraliga on October 26, 2010, alongside his twin brother Lukáš.

== Career statistics ==
=== Regular season and playoffs ===
			Regular season					Playoffs
Season	Team	League	GP	G	A	Pts	PIM	GP	G	A	Pts	PIM
