= Vladimír Vlk =

Slovak ice hockey player

- Born: April 23, 1968 (age 58) Skalica, Czechoslovakia
- Height: 6 ft 0 in (183 cm)
- Weight: 207 lb (94 kg; 14 st 11 lb)
- Position: Defence
- Shot: Left
- Played for: AC ZPS Zlín; HK Dukla Trenčín; HK 36 Skalica; HC Oceláři Třinec; HC Slovan Bratislava; HK Nitra; HK SKP Poprad; HC '05 Banská Bystrica
- National team: Slovakia
- NHL draft: Undrafted
- Playing career: 1990–2012

Vladimír Vlk (born 23 April 1968 in Skalica) is a Slovak former professional ice hockey defenceman,

== Career ==
Vlk played in the Slovak Extraliga for HK Dukla Trenčín, HK 36 Skalica, HC Slovan Bratislava, HK SKP Poprad and HC '05 Banská Bystrica. He also played in the Czech Extraliga for AC ZPS Zlín and HC Oceláři Třinec.

Vlk was a member of the Slovakia national team and played in the 1997 and 1999 Men's World Ice Hockey Championships.

== Career statistics ==
			Regular season					Playoffs
Season	Team	League	GP	G	A	Pts	PIM	GP	G	A	Pts	PIM
1990–91	AC ZPS Zlín	Czech	36	3	5	8	2	—	—	—	—	—
1991–92	AC ZPS Zlín	Czech	38	5	10	15	—	4	0	1	1	—
1991–92	SHK Hodonin	Czech2	—	—	—	—	—	—	—	—	—	—
1992–93	AC ZPS Zlín	Czech	35	3	6	9	—	9	1	1	2	—
1993–94	HK Dukla Trencin	Slovak	22	3	4	7	24	—	—	—	—	—
1994–95	HK Dukla Trencin	Slovak	31	1	15	16	34	9	0	0	0	0
1995–96	HK Dukla Trencin	Slovak	49	4	13	17	39	—	—	—	—	—
1995–96	HK 36 Skalica	Slovak2	4	0	0	0	2	—	—	—	—	—
1996–97	HK Dukla Trencin	Slovak	52	6	23	29	30	—	—	—	—	—
1997–98	HK Dukla Trencin	Slovak	46	4	20	24	62	—	—	—	—	—
1998–99	HK 36 Skalica	Slovak	48	5	20	25	83	—	—	—	—	—
1999–00	HK 36 Skalica	Slovak	30	6	6	12	76	—	—	—	—	—
1999–00	HC Ocelari Trinec	Czech	19	2	3	5	16	4	1	0	1	27
2000–01	HC Ocelari Trinec	Czech	50	1	10	11	42	—	—	—	—	—
2001–02	HK 36 Skalica	Slovak	—	—	—	—	—	—	—	—	—	—
2002–03	HC Slovan Bratislava	Slovak	54	7	21	28	44	—	—	—	—	—
2003–04	HC Slovan Bratislava	Slovak	53	7	20	27	56	—	—	—	—	—
2004–05	HK Nitra	Slovak	53	10	14	24	56	4	1	2	3	2
2005–06	HK Nitra	Slovak	52	6	22	28	86	13	1	5	6	24
2006–07	HK SKP Poprad	Slovak	42	2	15	17	38	—	—	—	—	—
2006–07	HK 36 Skalica	Slovak	7	0	2	2	4	5	0	3	3	14
2007–08	HK 36 Skalica	Slovak	45	6	25	31	80	13	1	8	9	18
2008–09	HC Banska Bystrica	Slovak	49	5	18	23	76	5	2	3	5	2
2009–10	HC Nitra	Slovak	44	1	6	7	46	10	0	2	2	6
2010–11	HC Dukla Senica	Slovak2	33	3	21	24	97	—	—	—	—	—
2010–11	HK 32 Liptovsky Mikulas	Slovak2	—	—	—	—	—	13	1	3	4	22
2011–12	SHK Hodonin	Czech3	6	1	6	7	2	—	—	—	—	—
Slovak totals			677	73	244	317	834	59	5	23	28	66
