= 1997–98 Slovak 1. Liga season =

Slovak ice hockey league season

The 1997–98 Slovak 1.Liga season was the fifth season of the Slovak 1. Liga, the second level of ice hockey in Slovakia. 12 teams participated in the league, and SK Iskra Banska Bystrica won the championship.

== Standings ==
	Club	GP	W	T	L	Goals	Pts
1.	ŠK Iskra Banská Bystrica	44	30	6	8	153:93	66
2.	HK VTJ Farmakol Prešov	44	27	6	11	166:109	60
3.	HK Spartak Dubnica	44	24	9	11	149:109	57
4.	HC Dukla Senica	44	25	5	14	150:130	55
5.	ŠHK Danubia 96 Bratislava	44	19	9	16	165:135	47
6.	HC Polygón Prievidza	44	20	7	17	140:128	47
7.	HC VTJ Michalovce	44	17	8	19	122:124	42
8.	HC VTJ Topoľčany	44	14	10	20	132:152	38
9.	HK ŠKP Žilina	44	11	7	22	138:163	37
10.	HK Trebišov	44	13	4	27	117:162	30
11.	HK 31 Kežmarok	44	9	8	27	107:166	26
12.	ŠK Matador Púchov	44	9	5	30	121:185	23
