= Peter Frühauf =

Slovak ice hockey player

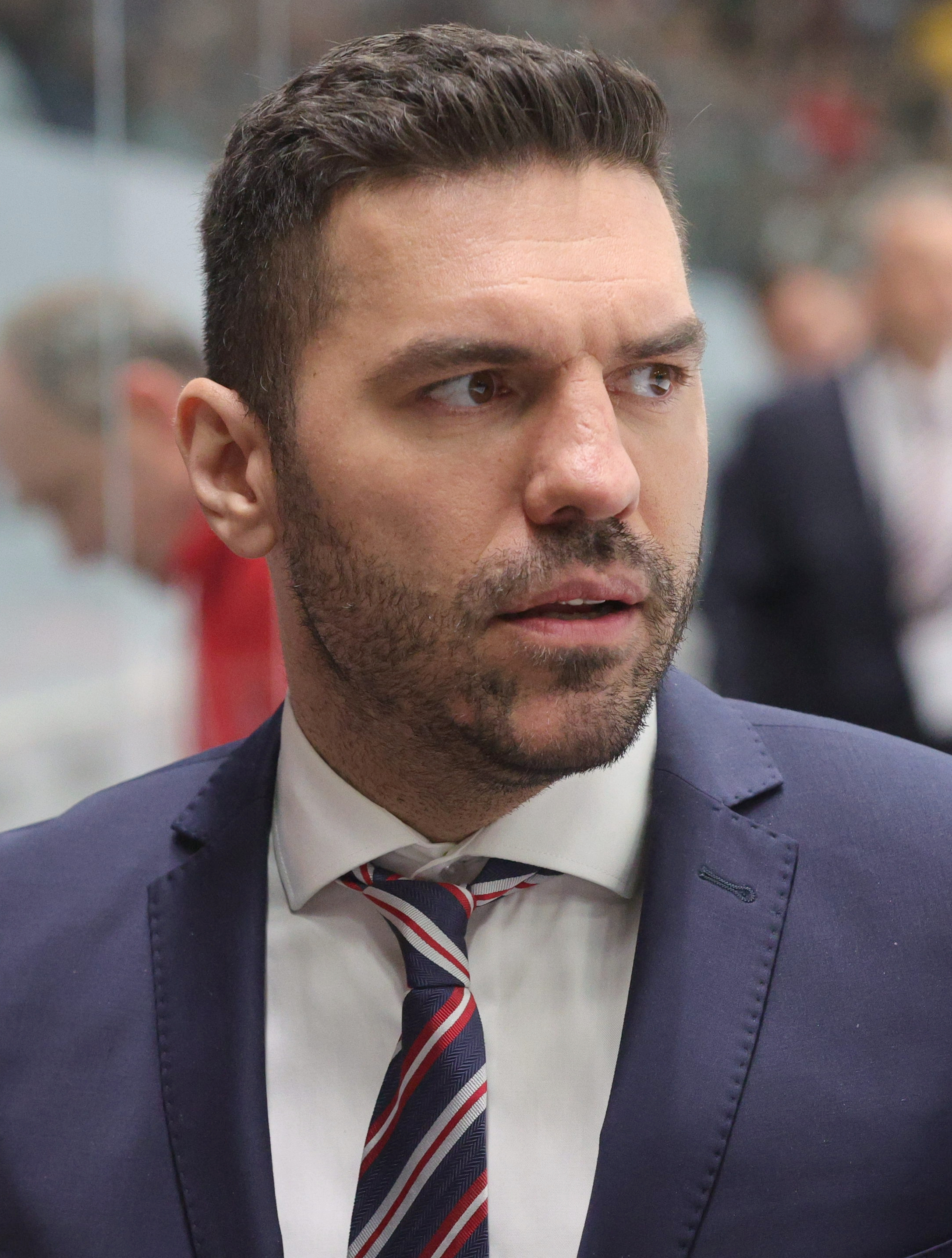
- Born: August 15, 1982 (age 43) Prešov, Czechoslovakia
- Height: 6 ft 0 in (183 cm)
- Weight: 205 lb (93 kg; 14 st 9 lb)
- Position: Defence
- Played for: HC Košice; MsHK Žilina; HC Oceláři Třinec; HKm Zvolen; HC '05 Banská Bystrica; HC Slovan Bratislava; Motor České Budějovice; Mountfield HK; HC Stadion Litoměřice; HC Plzeň; HK Dukla Trenčín
- National team: Slovakia
- Playing career: 1999–2019

Peter Frühauf (born 15 August 1982 in Prešov) is a Slovak former professional ice hockey defenceman.

Frühauf played in the Slovak Extraliga for HC Košice, MsHK Žilina, HKm Zvolen, HC '05 Banská Bystrica, HC Slovan Bratislava and HK Dukla Trenčín. He also played in the Czech Extraliga for HC Oceláři Třinec, Motor České Budějovice, Mountfield HK, HC Stadion Litoměřice and HC Plzeň.

He participated at the 2010 IIHF World Championship as a member of the Slovakia men's national ice hockey team.

== Career statistics ==
| | | | Regular season | | | | | Playoffs |
| Season | Team | League | GP | G | A | Pts | PIM | GP | G | A | Pts | PIM |
|---|---|---|---|---|---|---|---|---|---|---|---|---|
| 1995–96 | HC Presov 07 U18 | Slovak U18 | 6 | 0 | 0 | 0 | 0 | — | — | — | — | — |
| 1996–97 | HC Presov 07 U18 | Slovak U18 | 49 | 6 | 6 | 12 | 28 | — | — | — | — | — |
| 1997–98 | HC Presov 07 U18 | Slovak U18 | 47 | 4 | 15 | 19 | 58 | — | — | — | — | — |
| 1998–99 | HC Presov 07 U20 | SlovakU20 | 20 | 1 | 5 | 6 | 16 | — | — | — | — | — |
| 1999–00 | HK VTJ Farmakol Prešov | Slovak2 | 23 | 0 | 1 | 1 | 12 | — | — | — | — | — |
| 2000–01 | HK VTJ Farmakol Prešov | Slovak2 | — | — | — | — | — | — | — | — | — | — |
| 2000–01 | HC Dukla Senica | Slovak2 | — | — | — | — | — | — | — | — | — | — |
| 2001–02 | Topeka Scarecrows | USHL | 38 | 0 | 9 | 9 | 29 | — | — | — | — | — |
| 2002–03 | HC Košice | Slovak | 38 | 1 | 0 | 1 | 0 | — | — | — | — | — |
| 2002–03 | HK Trebisov | Slovak2 | 4 | 0 | 2 | 2 | 2 | — | — | — | — | — |
| 2002–03 | MsHK Žilina | Slovak | 4 | 0 | 1 | 1 | 2 | 4 | 0 | 0 | 0 | 0 |
| 2003–04 | HC Košice | Slovak | 49 | 2 | 7 | 9 | 34 | 8 | 1 | 1 | 2 | 2 |
| 2004–05 | HC Košice | Slovak | 36 | 2 | 2 | 4 | 10 | 10 | 0 | 1 | 1 | 10 |
| 2004–05 | HK Trebisov | Slovak2 | 1 | 0 | 1 | 1 | 0 | — | — | — | — | — |
| 2004–05 | PHK Prešov | Slovak2 | 11 | 1 | 6 | 7 | 0 | — | — | — | — | — |
| 2005–06 | HC Košice | Slovak | 46 | 1 | 3 | 4 | 36 | 6 | 0 | 0 | 0 | 6 |
| 2005–06 | HKm Humenné | Slovak2 | 1 | 0 | 1 | 1 | 0 | — | — | — | — | — |
| 2006–07 | MsHK Žilina | Slovak | 39 | 1 | 11 | 12 | 32 | — | — | — | — | — |
| 2006–07 | HC Ocelari Trinec | Czech | 8 | 0 | 1 | 1 | 12 | 7 | 0 | 0 | 0 | 10 |
| 2007–08 | HKM Zvolen | Slovak | 51 | 3 | 10 | 13 | 107 | 6 | 1 | 0 | 1 | 32 |
| 2008–09 | HC Slovan Bratislava | Slovak | 51 | 9 | 15 | 24 | 74 | 5 | 1 | 2 | 3 | 10 |
| 2009–10 | HC Slovan Bratislava | Slovak | 44 | 8 | 28 | 36 | 42 | 6 | 1 | 3 | 4 | 4 |
| 2010–11 | HC Slovan Bratislava | Slovak | 37 | 4 | 13 | 17 | 48 | 6 | 0 | 1 | 1 | 0 |
| 2011–12 | HC Slovan Bratislava | Slovak | 52 | 5 | 15 | 20 | 71 | 16 | 1 | 4 | 5 | 18 |
| 2012–13 | HC Ceske Budejovice | Czech | 37 | 3 | 6 | 9 | 24 | 5 | 1 | 1 | 2 | 6 |
| 2013–14 | HK Hradec Kralove | Czech | 48 | 7 | 15 | 22 | 32 | 6 | 1 | 2 | 3 | 6 |
| 2014–15 | HK Hradec Kralove | Czech | 26 | 1 | 7 | 8 | 18 | — | — | — | — | — |
| 2015–16 | HK Hradec Kralove | Czech | 31 | 4 | 14 | 18 | 8 | 5 | 1 | 0 | 1 | 2 |
| 2015–16 | HC Stadion Litoměřice | Czech2 | 1 | 0 | 0 | 0 | 0 | — | — | — | — | — |
| 2016–17 | HC Stadion Litoměřice | Czech2 | 12 | 4 | 1 | 5 | 2 | — | — | — | — | — |
| 2016–17 | HC Plzeň | Czech | 13 | 0 | 3 | 3 | 8 | 7 | 0 | 0 | 0 | 10 |
| 2017–18 | HK Dukla Trencin | Slovak | 52 | 3 | 15 | 18 | 18 | 15 | 0 | 6 | 6 | 14 |
| 2018–19 | HK Dukla Trencin | Slovak | 38 | 0 | 6 | 6 | 22 | 4 | 0 | 0 | 0 | 4 |
| Slovak totals | | | 537 | 39 | 126 | 165 | 496 | 86 | 5 | 18 | 23 | 100 |
| Czech totals | | | 163 | 15 | 46 | 61 | 102 | 30 | 3 | 3 | 6 | 34 |
