= 2009–10 Slovak 1. Liga season =

Slovak ice hockey league season

The 2009–10 Slovak 1.Liga season was the 17th season of the Slovak 1. Liga, the second level of ice hockey in Slovakia. 14 teams participated in the league, and SHK 37 Piestany won the championship.

== Regular season ==
	Club	GP	W	OTW	OTL	L	Goals	Pts
1.	ŠHK 37 Piešťany	38	28	2	3	5	150:78	88
2.	HC 46 Bardejov	38	18	5	2	13	159:115	64
3.	HC 07 Prešov	38	19	3	5	11	125:112	63
4.	HK Trnava	38	17	5	5	11	133:107	61
5.	HC Topoľčany	38	17	4	3	14	120:123	59
6.	HK VTJ Trebišov	38	18	2	2	16	126:136	58
7.	HK Brezno	38	16	3	1	18	125:132	54
8.	MHK SkiPark Kežmarok	38	16	3	2	17	124:106	54
9.	HK 95 Považská Bystrica	38	17	1	4	16	127:127	53
10.	HK Dukla Michalovce	38	14	4	4	16	118:123	50
11.	MHK Dolný Kubín	38	14	3	1	20	109:140	48
12.	HC 07 Detva	38	12	2	4	20	101:127	40
13.	HC Dukla Senica	38	10	2	2	24	99:134	34
14.	MšHK Prievidza	38	8	3	4	23	100:156	30

== Playoffs ==
=== Quarterfinals ===
- ŠHK 37 Piešťany – MHK SkiPark Kežmarok 3 : 0 (4:3PP, 7:1, 8:2)
- HC 46 Bardejov – HK Brezno 3 : 0 (6:2, 5:3, 9:0)
- HC 07 Prešov – HK Trebišov 3 : 2 (4:2, 2:4, 3:4sn, 5:2,5:3)
- HK Trnava – HC Topoľčany 3 : 2 (1:4, 3:0, 4:3, 1:4,1:0)

=== Semifinals ===
- ŠHK 37 Piešťany – HK Trnava 3 : 1 (5:1, 4:2, 2:7, 5:3)
- HC 46 Bardejov – HC 07 Prešov 0 : 3 (1:2, 1:3, 3:6)

=== Final ===
- ŠHK 37 Piešťany – HC 07 Prešov 4:3 (4:1, 5:3, 2:3PP, 1:0, 0:2, 2:4, 6:2)
