= HK Martin =

HK Martin may refer to:

- MHA Martin
- HK Martin (2018)

== See also ==
- Martin
