= 2010–11 Slovak 1. Liga season =

Slovak ice hockey league season

The 2010–11 Slovak 1.Liga season was the 18th season of the Slovak 1. Liga, the second level of ice hockey in Slovakia. 14 teams participated in the league, and SHK 37 Piestany won the championship.

== Regular season ==
	Club	GP	W	OTW	OTL	L	Goals	Pts
1.	ŠHK 37 Piešťany	38	28	1	2	7	146:67	88
2.	MHk 32 Liptovský Mikuláš	38	24	4	3	7	139:88	83
3.	HK Spišská Nová Ves	38	24	3	1	10	147:106	79
4.	HC 46 Bardejov	38	20	2	2	14	125:106	66
5.	HC 07 Detva	38	16	6	2	14	116:104	62
6.	HK VTJ Trebišov	38	15	5	2	16	124:99	57
7.	HK Trnava	38	16	3	1	18	112:106	55
8.	HK Dukla Michalovce	38	15	2	4	17	105:120	53
9.	HC Dukla Senica	38	14	3	4	17	99:140	52
10.	HK 95 Považská Bystrica	38	13	2	5	18	111:135	47
11.	HC Topoľčany	38	12	2	5	19	99:114	47
12.	HC 07 Prešov	38	11	3	4	20	99:125	43
13.	MHK Dolný Kubín	38	9	2	5	22	107:148	35
14.	HK Brezno	38	7	4	2	25	97:168	31

== Playoffs ==
=== Quarterfinals ===
- ŠHK 37 Piešťany – HK Dukla Michalovce 3:1 (4:1, 4:1, 1:2, 3:2)
- MHk 32 Liptovský Mikuláš – HK Trnava 3:0 (2:0, 3:1, 4:3)
- HK Spišská Nová Ves – HK Trebišov 3:0 (3:1, 9:3, 4:2)
- HC 46 Bardejov – HC 07 Detva 1:3 (4:0, 1:2sn, 1:4, 2:4)

=== Semifinals ===
- ŠHK 37 Piešťany – HC 07 Detva 3:0 (3:2pp, 5:2, 2:0)
- MHk 32 Liptovský Mikuláš – HK Spišská Nová Ves 3:0 (3:2, 2:1, 4:1)

=== Final ===
- ŠHK 37 Piešťany – MHk 32 Liptovský Mikuláš 4:3 (2:3sn, 4:3, 2:5, 4:0, 2:1, 2:5, 4:0)
