= 2011–12 Slovak 2. Liga season =

- League: Slovak 2. Liga
- Sport: Ice hockey
- Duration: 1 October 2011 – 11 February 2012 (regular season); 18 – 28 February 2012 (playoffs)
- Games: 18
- Teams: 14

Regular season
- League Champion: Iskra Partizánske

Playoffs

Finals
- Champions: Iskra Partizánske
- Runners-up: Rimavská Sobota

Seasons
- 2012–13 2010–11

The 2011–12 Slovak 2. Liga season was the 19th season of the Slovak 2. Liga, the third-level competition in Slovakia. 14 teams, divided into two groups, participated in the league, with the top team from each group qualifying for the playoffs. HK Iskra Partizánske were declared winners of the 2. Liga after beating HKM Rimavská Sobota in a best-of-three series. It was Partizánske's first title at the third level of Slovak ice hockey. They advanced to the playoff for participation in the following season's Slovak 1. Liga, but lost in four games in a best-of-seven series against HK 2016 Trebišov to miss out on promotion.

== Regular season ==
=== Group A (Western) ===
	Club	GP	W	OTW	OTL	L	Goals	Pts
1.	HK Iskra Partizánske	18	13	2	2	1	102:60	45
2.	HK Levice	18	10	2	1	5	74:61	35
3.	HK 96 Nitra	18	9	2	1	6	110:75	32
4.	MšHK Prievidza	18	9	1	3	5	96:68	32
5.	HO Hamíkovo Hamuliakovo	18	5	3	1	9	88:110	22
6.	HC Nove Zamky	18	6	1	2	9	90:83	22
7.	MHK Dubnica	18	0	0	1	17	37:140	1

=== Group B (Eastern) ===
	Club	GP	W	OTW	OTL	L	Goals	Pts
1.	HKM Rimavská Sobota	18	13	2	1	2	102:43	43
2.	HK Slovan Gelnica	18	8	2	2	6	83:86	30
3.	MHK Dolný Kubín	18	8	3	0	7	63:61	30
4.	HK 32 Liptovsky Mikulas B	18	9	0	1	8	87:69	28
5.	HK Warriors Bardejov	18	6	1	4	7	78:92	24
6.	HC Sabinov	18	6	2	1	9	77:97	23
7.	HK Brezno	18	3	1	0	14	61:103	11

== Playoffs ==
- HK Iskra Partizánske - HKM Rimavská Sobota 3:2 SO, 2:3, 4:3

== 1. Liga Qualification ==
- HK 2016 Trebišov - HK Iskra Partizánske 4:0, 8:2, 4:0, 10:2
