= HK Bardejov =

- City: Bardejov, Slovakia
- League: Slovak 2. Liga
- Founded: 2016
- Home arena: Bardejov Ice Stadium (capacity 1,911)
- Colours: Red, blue, white
- Website: www.hkbardejov.sk

HK Bardejov is an ice hockey team playing in the Slovak Slovak 2. Liga, and formed in 2016, after HC 46 Bardejov folded. They play in the city of Bardejov, Slovakia.

== Honours ==
=== Domestic ===
Slovak 2. Liga

- (bronze) 3rd place (2): 2018–19, 2023–24
