= 2008–09 Slovak 1. Liga season =

Sports season

The 2008–09 Slovak 1.Liga season was the 16th season of the Slovak 1. Liga, the second level of ice hockey in Slovakia. 16 teams participated in the league, and HC Spisska Nova Ves won the championship.

== Regular season ==
	Club	GP	W	OTW	OTL	L	Goals	Pts
1.	HK Spišská Nová Ves	44	32	5	0	7	195:73	106
2.	ŠHK 37 Piešťany	44	31	4	2	7	177:80	103
3.	HK Trnava	44	27	4	3	10	162:106	92
4.	HC 07 Prešov	44	23	2	4	15	143:113	77
5.	MHK Dolný Kubín	44	23	2	2	17	128:113	75
6.	HK VTJ Trebišov	44	20	2	5	17	172:161	69
7.	HC 07 Detva	44	20	2	1	21	145:146	65
8.	HK Ružinov 99 Bratislava	44	18	1	8	17	149:155	64
9.	MšHK Prievidza	44	16	5	4	19	145:153	62
10.	HC Dukla Senica	44	14	4	9	17	138:142	59
11.	HC 46 Bardejov	44	15	5	3	21	120:147	58
12.	HK Dukla Michalovce	44	13	5	6	20	129:151	55
13.	HC Topoľčany	44	12	6	5	21	113:167	53
14.	HK 95 Považská Bystrica	44	14	4	2	24	134:151	52
15.	HK Lokomotíva Nové Zámky	44	6	4	1	33	115:229	27
16.	HKM Lučenec	44	7	6	6	25	122:200	−21*

== Pre-Playoffs ==
- MHK Dolný Kubín – HK Dukla Michalovce 3:1 (5:0W, 4:2, 3:6, 2:1)
- HK VTJ Trebišov – HC 46 Bardejov 0:3 (1:2 n.V., 2:4, 2:3 n.V.)
- HC 07 Detva – HC Dukla Senica 1:3 (4:1, 1:2 n.P., 3:4 n.V., 0:9)
- HK Ružinov 99 Bratislava – MšHK Prievidza 1:3 (5:4 n.P., 1:2 n.P., 2:4, 1:4)

== Playoffs ==
=== Quarterfinals ===
HK Spišská Nová Ves – HC 46 Bardejov 3:0 (10:3, 6:1, 2:1p)

ŠHK 37 Piešťany – HC Dukla Senica 3:0 (2:1, 9:1, 5:0)

HK Trnava – MšHK Prievidza 3:0 (2:1, 4:2, 6:2)

HC 07 Prešov – MHK Dolný Kubín 3:0 (5:3, 1:0, 7:1)

=== Semifinals ===
HK Spišská Nová Ves – HC 07 Prešov 3:1 (4:0, 3:1, 2:3p, 5:3)

ŠHK 37 Piešťany – HK Trnava 3:0 (4:0, 4:2, 5:1)

=== Final ===
HK Spišská Nová Ves – ŠHK 37 Piešťany 3:1 (1:3, 5:2, 2:1, 3:0)
