= HK Sabinov =

- City: Sabinov, Slovakia
- League: Slovak 2. Liga
- Founded: 1948
- Home arena: Sabinov Ice Stadium (capacity: 200)
- Colours: Blue, grey, white
- Head coach: (Slovakia) Daniel Bortňák

HK Sabinov is an ice hockey team in Sabinov, Slovakia. They play in the Slovak 2. Liga, the third level of ice hockey in Slovakia. The club was founded in 1948.

== History ==
The Hockey Club was founded in Sabinov in 1948. His president was Eduard Ondáš and the secretary was Ján Seman. The first hockey game was played on a new ice rink with the team TJ Bardejov. Sabinov won this match 9–2.

== Club names ==
- ŠK Slávia Sabinov
- TJ Sokol Sabinov
- TJ Slavoj Sabinov
- TJ Družstevník Sabinov
- TJ Slovan Sabinov
- VTJ MHK Sabinov
- MHK Sabinov
- HK Sabinov
