= 1998–99 Slovak 1. Liga season =

Slovak ice hockey league season

The 1998–99 Slovak 1.Liga season was the sixth season of the Slovak 1. Liga, the second level of ice hockey in Slovakia. 12 teams participated in the league, and HK Spartak Dubnica won the championship.

== Regular season ==
	Club	GP	W	T	L	Goals	Pts
1.	HK Spartak Dubnica	22	15	0	5	94:37	30
2.	HK ŠKP Žilina	22	12	5	3	80:52	29
3.	ŠHK Danubia 96 Bratislava	22	10	4	6	66:47	24
4.	HK Trnava	22	10	4	6	71:54	24
5.	HC VTJ Michalovce	22	8	5	7	76:67	21
6.	HC Polygón Prievidza	22	8	4	8	58:70	20
7.	HC Dukla Senica	22	7	6	7	72:73	20
8.	HKm Zvolen B	22	7	3	10	51:85	17
9.	HC VTJ Topoľčany	22	7	1	12	65:62	15
10.	HK VTJ Wagon Slovakia Trebišov	22	5	5	10	52:73	15
11.	HK VTJ Piešťany	22	2	1	17	54:119	5
12.	HK 31 Setra Kežmarok	–	–	–	–	–:–	–

== Qualification round ==
	Club	GP	W	T	L	Goals	Pts
1.	HK Trnava	36	21	5	10	155:101	66
2.	HC VTJ Michalovce	36	17	9	10	156:114	60
3.	ŠHK Danubia 96 Bratislava	36	17	9	10	139:102	57
4.	HC VTJ Topoľčany	36	18	4	14	139:110	55
5.	HC Dukla Senica	36	15	7	14	137:131	47
6.	HKm Zvolen B	36	14	4	18	102:151	47
7.	HC Polygón Prievidza	36	12	5	19	114:163	42
8.	HK VTJ Wagon Slovakia Trebišov	36	9	7	20	106:136	38
9.	HK VTJ Piešťany	36	3	3	30	94:219	37
10.	HK 31 Setra Kežmarok	–	–	–	–	–:–	–

== Relegation ==
- HK VTJ Wagon Slovakia Trebišov – HK Povazská Bystrica 2:1 (5:1, 1:5, 5:3)
