= MHK Humenné =

- City: Humenné, Slovakia
- Founded: 1936
- Folded: 2018
- Home arena: Humenné Ice Stadium (capacity: 4,500)
- Colours: Blue, white, yellow
- Website: www.mhkhe.sk

MHK Humenné was a professional Slovak ice hockey club based in Humenné, Slovakia. The club was founded in 1936. Humenné promoted to the Slovak 1. Liga in 2005, first time in club history.

== Honours ==
=== Domestic ===
Slovak 2. Liga

- (gold) Winners (2): 2004–05, 2017–18
- (silver) Runners-up (3): 2013–14, 2014–15, 2016–17
