= 2011–12 Slovak 1. Liga season =

Slovak ice hockey league season

The 2011–12 Slovak 1.Liga season was the 19th season of the Slovak 1. Liga, the second level of ice hockey in Slovakia. 13 teams participated in the league, and HC 46 Bardejov won the championship. With HC Slovan Bratislava joining the Kontinental Hockey League for the following season, HK Spišská Nová Ves, MHk 32 Liptovský Mikuláš, HC 07 Prešov, HC Dukla Senica and ŠHK 37 Piešťany applied to be promoted to the Slovak Extraliga. The Slovak Ice Hockey Federation elected to promote ŠHK 37 Piešťany to the Extraliga. HC 46 Bardejov did not apply for promotion as it is HC Kosice's farm team. HK Púchov was relegated to the Slovak 2.Liga.

== Regular season ==
| | Club | GP | W | OTW | OTL | L | Goals | Pts |
|---|---|---|---|---|---|---|---|---|
| 1. | HC 46 Bardejov | 25 | 19 | 1 | 2 | 3 | 119:50 | 61 |
| 2. | ŠHK 37 Piešťany | 25 | 17 | 4 | 0 | 4 | 111:53 | 59 |
| 3. | HK Spišská Nová Ves | 25 | 16 | 3 | 1 | 5 | 104:61 | 55 |
| 4. | HC 07 Detva | 25 | 13 | 3 | 2 | 7 | 80:65 | 47 |
| 5. | MHk 32 Liptovský Mikuláš | 25 | 14 | 0 | 4 | 7 | 87:66 | 46 |
| 6. | HK Dukla Michalovce | 25 | 11 | 2 | 2 | 10 | 86:78 | 39 |
| 7. | HC Dukla Senica | 25 | 13 | 0 | 0 | 12 | 77:87 | 39 |
| 8. | HC 07 Prešov | 25 | 10 | 1 | 3 | 11 | 79:80 | 35 |
| 9. | HC Topoľčany | 25 | 10 | 0 | 1 | 14 | 92:105 | 31 |
| 10. | HK Trnava | 25 | 9 | 1 | 2 | 13 | 73:90 | 31 |
| 11. | HK 95 Považská Bystrica | 25 | 7 | 2 | 1 | 15 | 70:96 | 26 |
| 12. | HK Trebišov | 25 | 6 | 1 | 0 | 18 | 51:90 | 20 |
| 13. | HK Púchov | 25 | 1 | 0 | 1 | 23 | 45:145 | 4 |
| | HK Orange | 13 | 3 | 2 | 1 | 7 | 36:44 | 14 |

== Qualification round ==
| | Club | GP | W | OTW | OTL | L | Goals | Pts |
|---|---|---|---|---|---|---|---|---|
| 1. | HC 46 Bardejov | 38 | 26 | 2 | 3 | 7 | 177:81 | 85 |
| 2. | ŠHK 37 Piešťany | 38 | 23 | 6 | 1 | 8 | 140:83 | 82 |
| 3. | MHk 32 Liptovský Mikuláš | 38 | 21 | 2 | 4 | 11 | 118:104 | 71 |
| 4. | HK Spišská Nová Ves | 38 | 19 | 3 | 1 | 15 | 134:105 | 64 |
| 5. | HC Dukla Senica | 38 | 18 | 3 | 1 | 16 | 126:125 | 61 |
| 6. | HK Dukla Michalovce | 38 | 18 | 1 | 3 | 16 | 122:114 | 59 |
| 7. | HC 07 Detva | 38 | 16 | 3 | 4 | 15 | 107:115 | 58 |
| 8. | HC 07 Prešov | 38 | 12 | 2 | 3 | 21 | 115:129 | 43 |
| 9. | HC Topoľčany | 38 | 9 | 1 | 2 | 26 | 108:201 | 31 |
| 10. | HK Trnava | 38 | 8 | 2 | 2 | 26 | 100:157 | 30 |
| | HK Orange | 20 | 3 | 2 | 3 | 12 | 53:86 | 16 |

== Playoffs ==
Quarter-finals
HC 46 Bardejov | 3
HC 07 Prešov | 0
MHk 32 Liptovský Mikuláš | 2
HK Dukla Michalovce | 3
ŠHK 37 Piešťany | 3
HC 07 Detva | 0
HK Spišská Nová Ves | 0
HC Dukla Senica | 3

Semi-finals
HC 46 Bardejov | 3
HK Dukla Michalovce | 0
ŠHK 37 Piešťany | 3
HK Dukla Senica | 1

Final
HC 46 Bardejov | 4
ŠHK 37 Piešťany | 3

== Playouts ==
| | Club | GP | W | OTW | OTL | L | Goals | Pts |
|---|---|---|---|---|---|---|---|---|
| 11. | HK 95 Považská Bystrica | 16 | 11 | 1 | 1 | 3 | 79:37 | 36 |
| 12. | HK Trebišov | 16 | 10 | 1 | 1 | 4 | 66:42 | 33 |
| 13. | HK Púchov | 16 | 0 | 1 | 1 | 14 | 40:106 | 3 |

== Relegation ==
HK Trebišov - Iskra Partizánske 4:0 (4:0; 8:2; 4:0; 10:2)
