= Púchov Ice Stadium =

Coordinates: 49°7′2″N 18°19′8″E

Púchov Zimny Arena is an indoor ice hockey venue in Púchov, Slovakia.

The arena has a capacity of 1,400 people, and is the home arena of HK Orange 20.
