= 2004–05 Slovak 1. Liga season =

Slovak ice hockey league season

The 2004–05 Slovak 1.Liga season was the 12th season of the Slovak 1. Liga, the second level of ice hockey in Slovakia. 12 teams participated in the league, and HKm Detva (Zvolen B) won the championship.

== Regular season ==
| | Club | GP | W | OTW | OTL | L | Goals | Pts |
|---|---|---|---|---|---|---|---|---|
| 1. | HC Martimex ZŤS Martin | 40 | 26 | 7 | 4 | 7 | 175:93 | 96 |
| 2. | HC VTJ Topoľčany | 40 | 25 | 3 | 4 | 12 | 161:132 | 85 |
| 3. | PHK Prešov | 40 | 21 | 7 | 2 | 14 | 158:139 | 79 |
| 4. | HK Trnava | 40 | 20 | 5 | 7 | 12 | 160:123 | 77 |
| 5. | MšHK Prievidza | 40 | 21 | 4 | 5 | 14 | 126:123 | 76 |
| 6. | HKm Detva (Zvolen B) | 40 | 19 | 5 | 2 | 18 | 155:123 | 69 |
| 7. | HK Spišská Nová Ves | 40 | 21 | 1 | 1 | 21 | 146:145 | 66 |
| 8. | HC Dukla Senica | 40 | 19 | 3 | 3 | 19 | 154:154 | 66 |
| 9. | HK 95 Považská Bystrica | 40 | 19 | 0 | 4 | 21 | 133:138 | 61 |
| 10. | HK VTJ Trebišov | 40 | 16 | 1 | 3 | 24 | 151:197 | 53 |
| 11. | ŠHK 37 Piešťany | 40 | 9 | 3 | 2 | 30 | 132:206 | 35 |
| 12. | ŠaHK Iskra Banská Bystrica | 40 | 8 | 1 | 3 | 32 | 109:187 | 29 |

== Playoffs ==
=== Quarterfinals ===
- MHC Martin – HC Dukla Senica 4:1 (4:2, 7:4, 1:3, 4:1, 5:2)
- HC VTJ Telvis Topoľčany – HK Spišská Nová Ves 4:0 (3:2sn, 4:1, 4:2, 6:5PP)
- PHK Prešov – HKm Detva (Zvolen B) 2:4 (2:3, 3:2, 2:3, 0:1, 7:2, 1:3)
- HK Trnava – MšHK Prievidza 0:4 (1:3, 2:3, 2:6, 1:3)

=== Semifinals ===
- MHC Martin – HKm Detva (Zvolen B) 0:4 (1:3, 3:5, 2:3, 1:2sn)
- HC VTJ Telvis Topoľčany – MšHK Prievidza 4:3 (2:4, 4:5sn, 5:3, 5:4, 2:4, 5:3, 3:1)

=== Final ===
- HC VTJ Telvis Topoľčany – HKm Detva (Zvolen B) 1:4 (5:3, 1:8, 1:9, 0:3, 1:3)

== Relegation ==
- ŠaHK Iskra Banská Bystrica – HKm Humenné 3:2 (1:4, 4:1, 3:2, 3:5, 5:4 sn)
