= 2013–14 Slovak 1. Liga season =

Slovak ice hockey league season

The 2013–14 Slovak 1.Liga season was the 21st season of the Slovak 1. Liga, the second level of ice hockey in Slovakia. 12 teams participated in the league, and HC 46 Bardejov won the championship.

== Regular season ==
	Club	GP	W	OTW	OTL	L	Goals	Pts
1.	HC 46 Bardejov	44	33	2	1	8	204:99	104
2.	HC Dukla Senica	44	29	3	1	11	154:95	94
3.	HK Trnava	44	26	3	2	13	123:88	86
4.	HC 07 Detva	44	22	5	2	15	157:113	78
5.	HK Dukla Michalovce	44	25	0	2	17	170:141	77
6.	HC Prešov Penguins	44	21	2	4	17	133:122	71
7.	HK 32 Liptovsky Mikulas	44	19	4	4	17	146:124	69
8.	HK Spišská Nová Ves	44	19	3	3	19	141:140	66
9.	HC Prievidza	44	12	4	1	27	119:209	45
10.	HC Topoľčany	44	8	2	6	28	131:185	34
11.	HK Orange 20	44	9	2	3	30	98:164	34
12.	HK 95 Panthers Považská Bystrica	44	10	1	2	31	97:193	34

== Playoffs ==
Quarter-finals
HC 46 Bardejov	3
HK Spišská Nová Ves	2
HC Dukla Senica	0
HK 32 Liptovsky Mikulas	3
HK Trnava	3
HC Prešov Penguins	1
HC 07 Detva	2
HK Dukla Michalovce	3

Semi-finals
HC 46 Bardejov	3
HK 32 Liptovsky Mikulas	0
HK Trnava	2
HK Dukla Michalovce	3

Final
HC 46 Bardejov	4
HK Dukla Michalovce	1

== Playouts ==
	Club	GP	W	OTW	OTL	L	Goals	Pts
9.	HC Prievidza	12	5	2	0	5	45:45	19
10.	HK 95 Panthers Považská Bystrica	12	5	1	1	5	33:38	18
11.	HC Topoľčany	12	4	1	3	4	50:45	17

== Relegation ==
- HC Topoľčany - HK Dubnica 4:3 (0:3, 3:4 SO, 2:4, 4:3 OT, 4:1, 3:2 OT, 5:1)
