= HK Martin (2018) =

Slovak ice hockey club

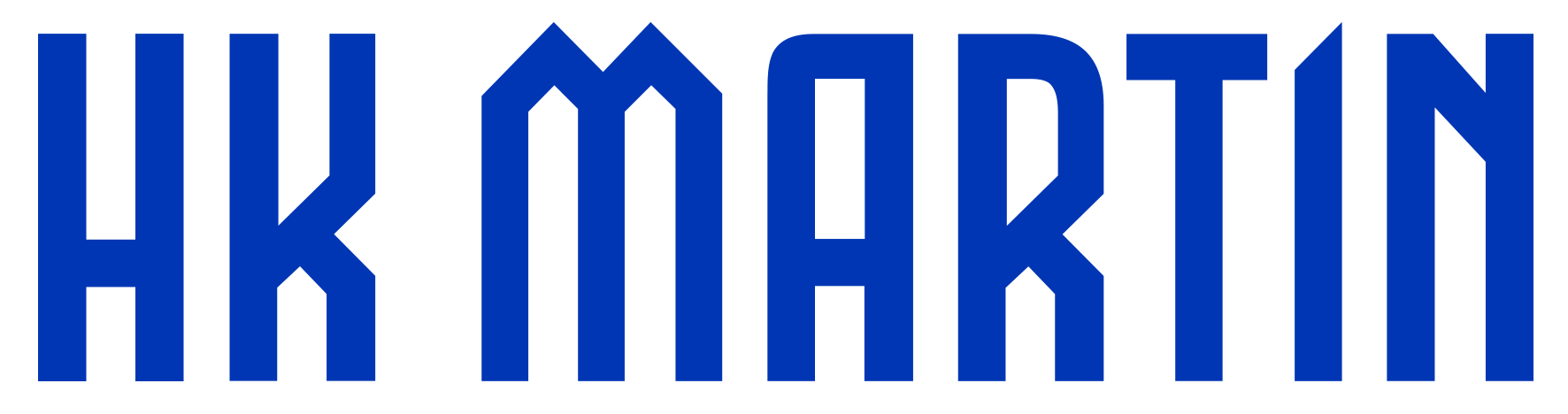
- City: Martin, Slovakia
- League: Slovenská hokejová liga
- Founded: 2018
- Dissolved: 2023
- Home arena: Zimný štadión Martin (capacity: 4,200)

HK Martin was a Slovak ice hockey club that last played in the Slovenská hokejová liga, the second tier of hockey in the country.

In its 6 years of existence, the club’s most successful season was in 2018/19, when it finished runners up in the Slovenská hokejová liga, losing to Dukla Michalovce in the final match of the play offs. In 2023, the club was dissolved.

== History ==
HK Martin was formed when the MHC Martin club, which operated in the top league for many years, was kicked out after a financial collapse before the 2017/18 season. With the support of the city of Martin, a new men's senior club was established, which in the 2017/18 season operated under the 2nd league. In the club’s first season, they won promotion to the 1st league as a undefeated finalist.

The won license to start in the competition was subsequently transferred to the newly established HK Martin club. The team for the 1st league was composed mainly of Martin's youth academy graduates. In the club’s first season, HK Martin finished second in the regular season behind Dukla Michalovce, and the two teams squared off in the play-off final, with Michalovce winning 4–3 on aggregate. HK Martin thus took second place overall in the competition.

In 2023, due to financial reasons, HK Martin would be dissolved, selling their first league license to HC Prešov.

== Honors ==
=== Domestic ===
- Slovenská hokejová liga (2nd tier)
  - Runners up: 2018/19
- Slovak 2. Liga (3rd tier)
  - Winners: 2017/18
