= MHK Kežmarok =

- City: Kežmarok, Slovakia
- League: Slovak 2. Liga
- Founded: 1931
- Home arena: Kežmarok Ice Stadium (capacity 3,000)
- Colours: Blue, yellow
- Head coach: (Slovakia) Dušan Hudák
- Website: www.mhkkezmarok.sk

MHK Kežmarok is a professional Slovak ice hockey team playing in the Slovak Slovak 2. Liga. They play their games at Kežmarok Ice Stadium in the Slovak town of Kežmarok. The club was founded in 1931.

== History ==
The club was founded in 1931. In the 2006–07 season Kežmarok won the title in Slovak 1. Liga. They played in Slovak Extraliga in two seasons 2007–08 season when they finished on 9th place and didn't qualify for the playoffs. In 2008–09 season they finished on 12th place and won't play in Slovak Extraliga next season.

== Honours ==
=== Domestic ===
Slovak 1. Liga

- (gold) Winners (1): 2006–07

== Notable players ==
- Ľuboš Bartečko
- Daniel Brejčák
- Radoslav Suchý
- Patrik Svitana
- Dávid Buc
- Adam Lapšanský
- Ján Brejčák
- Richard Jenčík
