= 1999–2000 Slovak 1. Liga season =

Slovak ice hockey league season

The 1999–2000 Slovak 1.Liga season was the seventh season of the Slovak 1. Liga, the second level of ice hockey in Slovakia. 12 teams participated in the league, and Marinskeho hokeja club won the championship.

== Standings ==
	Club	GP	W	T	L	Goals	Pts
1.	Martinskeho hokeja club	44	32	5	7	233:106	69
2.	ŠK Iskra Banská Bystrica	44	31	2	11	234:108	64
3.	HK Trnava	44	29	4	11	234:144	61
4.	HC VTJ Topoľčany	44	29	3	12	195:122	61
5.	HK ŠKP Žilina	44	25	6	13	176:136	56
6.	MHC Nitra	44	20	4	20	202:150	44
7.	HK VTJ Farmakol Prešov	44	19	5	20	149:142	43
8.	HKm Zvolen B	44	18	5	21	155:151	41
9.	HK Spartak Dubnica	44	17	2	25	151:191	36
10.	HC VTJ Michalovce	44	9	4	31	133:257	22
11.	HC Dukla Senica	44	7	6	31	106:265	20
12.	HC Polygon Prievidza	44	4	2	38	87:283	10
