= Slovak 2. Liga =

Slovak men's ice hockey league

2. Slovenská hokejová liga
- Current season, competition or edition: 2026–27 Slovak 2. Liga season
- Sport: Ice hockey
- Founded: 1993
- No. of teams: 16 teams
- Country: Slovakia
- Most recent champion: HK Martin
- Promotion to: Slovenská hokejová liga

The 2. Slovenská hokejová liga, also known as the 2. hokejová liga or the 2HL, is currently the third tier of professional ice hockey in Slovakia. For the 2018–19 season, the 2. liga is divided into two different divisions. It lies below the Slovak Extraliga and the Slovak 1. Liga. The league is composed of 16 teams divided into two groups, whose teams are divided geographically (Western and Eastern).

== Teams 2022-23 ==
=== Western division ===
Teams from Slovakia competing in Slovak 2. liga Západ (Western division) in the 2021–22 season.

Team name	City	Venue	Capacity	Founded
Iskra Partizánske	Partizánske	Partizánske Ice Stadium	1,600	1974
HK 91 Senica	Senica	Senica Ice Stadium	3,000	1991
ŠHK Púchov	Púchov	Púchov Ice Stadium	1,943	2013
MSK Hviezda Dolný Kubín	Dolný Kubín	Dolný Kubín Ice Stadium	500	1995

=== Eastern division ===
Teams from Slovakia competing in Slovak 2. liga Východ (Eastern division) in the 2019–20 season.

Team name	City	Venue	Capacity	Founded
HK Bardejov	Bardejov	Bardejov Ice Stadium	1,911	2016
HK Sabinov	Sabinov	Sabinov Ice Stadium	Unknown	1948
HKM Rimavská Sobota	Rimavská Sobota	Rimavská Sobota Ice Stadium	Unknown	1994
HK 2016 Trebišov	Trebišov	Trebišov Ice Stadium	2,000	1992
MHk 32 Liptovský Mikuláš B	Liptovský Mikuláš	Liptovský Mikuláš Ice Stadium	3,680	1934
MHK Kežmarok	Kežmarok	Kežmarok Ice Stadium	3,000	1931

== Champions ==
Note: Bold indicates overall champion.

- 2024-25 : **HK Martin (2018)**
- 2023-24 : **MŠK Púchov**
- 2022-23 : **HKM Rimavská Sobota**
- 2021-22 : **HK Steel Team Trebišov**
- 2020-21 : season wasn’t played because of COVID-19 pandemic.
- 2019-20 : because of the COVID-19 pandemic play-off final and match for the 3rd place wasn’t played.
- 2018–19 : **HK Levice (Western)**, HKM Rimavská Sobota (Eastern)
- 2017–18 : **HK Martin** (Western), **MHK Humenné (Eastern)**
- 2016–17 : **MHK Dubnica nad Vahom (Western)**, MHK Humenné (Eastern)
- 2015–16 : **HK 96 Nitra (Western)**, MHk 32 Liptovský Mikuláš B (Eastern)
- 2014–15 : **HC Mikron Nové Zámky (Western)**, MHK Bemaco Humenné (Eastern)
- 2013–14 : **MHK Dubnica (Western)**, MHK Bemaco Humenné (Eastern)
- 2012–13 : HK Dynamax Nitra (Western), **MŠK Hviezda Dolný Kubín (Eastern)**
- 2011–12 : **HK Iskra Partizánske (Western)**, HKM Rimavská Sobota (Eastern)
- 2010–11 : HK Dynamax Nitra (Western), **HK Púchov (Central)**, MHK Ružomberok (Eastern)
- 2009–10 : **HK Dynamax Nitra (Western)**, HK Púchov (Central), HKM Rimavská Sobota (Eastern)
- 2008–09 : **HK Brezno (Eastern)**, HK Púchov (Western)
- 2007–08 : **HC 07 Detva (Eastern)**, HK Púchov (Western)
- 2006–07 : **HC 46 Bardejov (Eastern)**, ŠK Matterhorn Púchov (Western)
- 2005–06 : **HK Ružinov 99 Bratislava (Western)**, MHK SkiPark Kežmarok (Eastern)
- 2004–05 : **HKm Humenné (Eastern)**, HK Lokomotíva Nové Zámky (Western)
- 2003–04 : **HK Trnava (Western)**, HK Brezno (Eastern)
- 2002–03 : HK Brezno (Eastern), **ŠHK 37 Piešťany (Western)**
- 2001–02 : **HK Ružinov 99 Bratislava (Western)**, HK 32 Liptovský Mikuláš B (Eastern)
- 2000–01 : **Považská Bystrica (Western)**, HKm Detva (Central), HK Spisska Nova Ves B (Eastern)
- 1999–2000 : Považská Bystrica (Western), **HK VTJ Wagon Slovakia Trebišov (Eastern)**
- 1998–99 : **Považská Bystrica**
- 1997–98 : KĽŠ Spartak Trnava (Western), **HKm Zvolen B (Central)**, HKm Humenné (Eastern)
- 1996–97 : Retir Sľažany (Western), HK Slovan Trstená (Central), **HK VTJ Wagon Slovakia Trebišov (Eastern)**
- 1995–96 : **Spartak BEZ Bratislava (Western)**, HK Medokýš Turčianske Teplice (Central), HK Agro White Lady Levoča (Eastern)
- 1994–95 : Spartak BEZ Bratislava (Western), HK Medokýš Turčianske Teplice (Central), HC Compact Rožňava (Eastern)
- 1993–94 : HC Univerzita Bratislava (Western), ŠK Matador Púchov (Central), HC Compact Rožňava (Eastern)
