= HC 46 Bardejov =

HC 46 BEMACO Bardejov
- City: Bardejov, Slovakia
- Founded: 1946
- Folded: 2016
- Home arena: Bardejov Ice Stadium (capacity 1,911)
- Colours: Red, blue, white
- Website: hc46.sk

HC 46 BEMACO Bardejov was an ice hockey team in Bardejov, Slovakia. Recently they have played in the Slovak 1. Liga, the second level of Slovak ice hockey. The team was founded in 1946.

== Honours ==
=== Domestic ===
Slovak 1. Liga

- (gold) Winners (3): 2011–12, 2012–13, 2013–14
- (silver) Runners-up (1): 2015–16
- (bronze) 3rd place (2): 2009–10, 2014–15

Slovak 2. Liga

- (gold) Winners (1): 2006–07

== Club names ==
- Sokol Bardejov – 1946
- Slavoj Bardejov – TBA
- Partizán Bardejov (1963–1985)
- Stavstroj TaSR Bardejov (1985–1992)
- HC-46 Bardejov (1992–2009)
- HC 46 BEMACO Bardejov (2009–2016)
