= ŠHK 37 Piešťany =

- Nickname: Havrani
- City: Piešťany, Slovakia
- Founded: 1937
- Dissolved: 2022
- Home arena: Patrícia Ice Arena 37 (capacity 3,238)
- Colours: Blue, yellow
- General manager: (Slovakia) Jaroslav Lušňák
- Website: www.shk37piestany.sk

ŠHK 37 Piešťany was a professional Slovak ice hockey club, based in Piešťany, Slovakia. The club was founded in 1937. The team is nicknamed Havrani ("ravens"). The club was the regular-season champion of the Slovak 1. Liga in 2010 and 2011. They subsequently won the playoffs in 2011, beating HK 32 Liptovský Mikuláš in seven games, to advance to the playoff for the Extraliga. After finishing second in the 2011–12 season, they advanced to the Extraliga administratively following HC Slovan Bratislava's departure to the Kontinental Hockey League.

== Honours ==
=== Domestic ===
Slovak 1. Liga

- (gold) Winners (2): 2009–10, 2010–11
- (silver) Runners-up (2): 2008–09, 2011–12

Slovak 2. Liga

- (gold) Winners (1): 2002–03
