= HK Ružinov =

HK Ružinov 99 Bratislava
- City: Bratislava, Slovakia
- Founded: 1957
- Home arena: Vladimír Dzurilla Arena (capacity: 3,500)
- Colours: Red, white, yellow
- Website: hkruzinov.sk

HK Ružinov 99 Bratislava is an ice hockey team in Bratislava, Slovakia. It was founded in 1957.

== History ==
HK Ružinov played for many years in the 1st. Slovak National Hockey League. Since its founding, BEZ-ka has been a base for many excellent players who later landed in Slovan. In 1996 the name was changed to ŠHK Danubia 96 Bratislava and they play in the Slovak 1. Liga since. In 1999, the club changed its name to HK Ružinov 99 Bratislava, under which it still operates today. The side won the 2. Liga in the 2005–06 season, defeating Kežmarok in the final. In 2009, the club's directors announced, that the A- team will not participate in the 1. liga because of financial problems. To this day, only the youth clubs function

== Honours ==
=== Domestic ===
Slovak 2. Liga

- (gold) Winners (3): 1995–96, 2001–02, 2005–06
