= MHK Dolný Kubín =

- City: Dolný Kubín, Slovakia
- League: Slovak 2. Liga
- Founded: 1995
- Home arena: Dolný Kubín Ice Stadium (capacity: 500)
- Colours: Red, black, white
- Head coach: (Slovakia) Radoslav Bielečka
- Website: www.hkdk.sk

MHK Dolný Kubín is an ice hockey team in Dolný Kubín, Slovakia. They play in the Slovak 2. Liga, the third level of ice hockey in Slovakia. The club was founded in 1995.

== Honours ==
=== Domestic ===
Slovak 2. Liga

- (gold) Winners (1): 2012–13
