= HK 95 Panthers Považská Bystrica =

- Nickname: Panteri
- City: Považská Bystrica, Slovakia
- League: Slovak 1. Liga
- Founded: 1995
- Home arena: Považská Bystrica Ice Stadium (capacity 2,466)
- Colours: Red, white, black
- Head coach: (Slovakia) Jakub Ručkay
- Captain: Ján Zlocha
- Website: hk95pby.hockeyslovakia.sk

HK 95 Panthers Považská Bystrica is a professional Slovak ice hockey club based in Považská Bystrica, Slovakia. They play in the Slovak 1. Liga, the second level of ice hockey in the country. The club was founded in 1995.

== Honours ==
=== Domestic ===
Slovak 1. Liga

- (bronze) 3rd place (1): 2023–24

Slovak 2. Liga

- (gold) Winners (2): 1998–99, 2000–01
