= HC 07 Detva =

- City: Detva, Slovakia
- League: Slovak 1. Liga
- Founded: 2007
- Home arena: Detva Ice Stadium (capacity 1,800)
- Colours: Yellow, black, white, blue
- Website: www.hc07detva.net

HC 07 Detva is a professional ice hockey team playing in the Slovak 1. Liga founded in 2007. They play in the city of Detva, Slovakia at Detva Ice Stadium.

== History ==
The club was founded in 2007. In the 2017–18 season did not qualify for the playoffs, it was first season for Detva in Slovak Extraliga. In relegation series they finished on second place and will play in Slovak Extraliga next season. In the 2018–19 season they first time qualified to quarterfinal, when lost with champions of the league HC '05 Banská Bystrica 1–4 in the series.

== Honours ==
=== Domestic ===
Slovak 1. Liga

- (gold) Winners (2): 2014–15, 2016–17

Slovak 2. Liga

- (gold) Winners (1): 2007–08
