= HC Topoľčany =

- City: Topoľčany, Slovakia
- League: Slovak 1. Liga
- Founded: 1932
- Home arena: Topvar Aréna (capacity 3,400)
- Colours: Red, yellow, black
- Head coach: Roman Stantien
- Captain: Miloš Bystričan
- Website: www.hctopolcany.sk

HC Topoľčany is a professional Slovak ice hockey club based in Topoľčany, Slovakia. They play in the Slovak 1. Liga, the second level of ice hockey in the country. The club was founded in 1932.

== Honours ==
=== Domestic ===
Slovak 1. Liga

- (silver) Runners-up (1): 2004–05
- (bronze) 3rd place (2): 2001–02, 2005–06

== Club names ==
- AC Juventus Topoľčany (1932–1939)
- TS Topoľčany (1939–1949, 1964–1990)
- TJ Topoľčany (1949–1964)
- HC VTJ Topoľčany (1993–2006)
- HC Topoľčany (1990–1993, 2006–present)

== Managers ==
- Emil Rauchmaul (1934-1935)
