= HK 2016 Trebišov =

Slovak ice hockey team

HK STEEL TEAM Trebišov
- City: Trebišov, Slovakia
- League: TIPOS Slovenská hokejová liga
- Founded: 1992
- Home arena: Trebišov Ice Stadium (capacity: 4,000)
- Colours: Yellow, blue
- Head coach: (Slovakia) Richard Šechný
- Captain: Tomáš Valečko

HK STEEL TEAM Trebišov is an ice hockey team in Trebišov, Slovakia. They play in the TIPOS Slovenská hokejová liga, the second level of ice hockey in the country. The club was re-established as HK 2016 Trebišov in 2016, after three years.

The club was founded as AZD VTJ Trebišov in 1992. They changed their name to HK Trebišov in 2006 and to current HK 2016 Trebišov in 2016.

== Honours ==
=== Domestic ===
Slovak 2. Liga

- (gold) Winners (2): 1996–97, 1999–2000

== Notable players ==
- Jozef Škrak
- Jaroslav Ferjo
- Stanislav Kall
- Erik Marinov
- Roman Bajzát
- Ladislav Gábriš
- Stanislav Kožár
- Peter Frühauf
- Andrej Kmeč
- Igor Liba
- Milan Staš
- Vladimír Svitek
- Michal Pahulák
- Peter Zůbek
- Igor Šalata
- Richard Miľovčík
- Štefan Rusnák
- Peter Zambori
