= HK Trnava =

HK Gladiators Trnava
- Nickname: Gladiátori
- City: Trnava, Slovakia
- League: Slovak 1. Liga
- Founded: 1957
- Home arena: Trnava Ice Stadium
- Colours: Red, black, white
- General manager: Adriana Hosťovecká
- Head coach: (Slovakia) Martin Baran
- Captain: (Slovakia) Roman Jurák
- Website: hktrnava.sk

HK Gladiators Trnava is an ice hockey team based in Trnava, Slovakia. It plays in the Slovak 1. Liga, the country's second division of ice hockey. The club was founded in 1957.

== History ==
Ice hockey has been played in Trnava since 1923 when the first friendly game between ŠK Trnava and 1.ČsŠK Bratislava was played at the nature rink in Eagle Garden. Since 1935 Trnava played in western area with three clubs from Bratislava (Slavia, VŠ, ČsŠK) and Nitra, Nove Mesto nad Vahom, Topoľčany and other. Since the season 2004–05, Trnava has been playing in the Slovak 1. Liga, the second tier of hockey in the country.

== Stadium ==
Trnava’s stadium has two ice rinks: the main one with dimensions of 60 x 30 m and the training one with dimensions of 60 x 28 m, which is mainly used for public skating. As a part of the building, changing rooms and social and hygienic facilities have been built, which provide facilities for the activities of sports clubs focused on ice sports: Hockey Club Trnava, Short track Club Trnava and Figure Skating Club Trnava.

== Club names ==
- Club of ice sports Spartak Trnava
- Skating club
- HK Trnava
- HK Gladiators Trnava

== Honours ==
=== Domestic ===
Slovak 1. Liga

- (bronze) 3rd place (5): 1998–99, 1999–2000, 2007–08, 2008–09, 2013–14

Slovak 2. Liga

- (gold) Winners (1): 2003–04

== Sport achievements ==
- 2003/04 - first team was promoted to the 1. hockey league again, juniors under 20 and the team under 18 were promoted to the Extraliga
- 2004/05 - 3. place u18 in Extraliga u18
- 2005/06 - 3. place u20 in Extraliga u20
- 2013/14 - 1. place u18 in 1. hockey league u18
