= HC Dukla Senica =

- City: Senica, Slovakia
- League: Slovak 2. Liga
- Founded: 1991
- Home arena: Senica Ice Stadium (capacity 3,000)
- Colours: Yellow, red, white
- Website: www.hk91senica.sk

Franchise history
- 1989-1993: VTJ Senica
- 1993-1996: Dukla Senica
- 1996-2000: Dukla Nafta Senica
- 2000-2003: Dukla Inpro Senica
- 2003-2016: HC Dukla Senica
- 2016-2022: HK 91 Senica
- 2022-: HC Dukla Senica

HC Dukla Senica is an ice hockey team in Senica, Slovakia. They play in the Slovak 2. Liga, the third level of Slovak ice hockey. The team was founded in 1991.
