= 2013–14 Slovak Extraliga season =

- League: Slovak Extraliga
- Sport: Ice hockey
- Duration: September 2013 – 21 April 2014
- Average attendance: 1,777▼

Regular season
- Regular Season Champion: HC Košice
- Top scorer: Jozef Stümpel (HK Nitra)

Playoffs
- Playoffs MVP: Jozef Stümpel

Finals
- Champions: HC Košice
- Runners-up: HK Nitra

Slovak Extraliga seasons
- 2012–13 2014–15

The 2013–14 Slovak Extraliga season was the 21st season of the Slovak Extraliga, the highest level of ice hockey in Slovakia.

== Teams ==
The following teams are participating in the 2013–14 season. The HK Orange 20 is a project for preparation of the Slovakia junior ice hockey team for the IIHF World Junior Championship. The team do not play complete regular season and cannot promote to the playoffs or get relegated. First 8 teams in table after the regular season (56 games) will promote to the playoffs.

Extraliga teams for the 2013-14 season.

Team name	Location	Venue	Capacity	Titles	2012-13
HKm Zvolen	Zvolen	Zvolen Ice Stadium	7,038	2	Champions
HC Košice	Košice	Steel Aréna	8,378	6	Runners-up
HK Nitra	Nitra	Nitra Aréna	3,600	0	Semi-finals
ŠHK 37 Piešťany	Piešťany	EASTON Aréna	3,050	0	Semi-finals
HC ’05 Banská Bystrica	Banská Bystrica	Banská Bystrica Ice Stadium	3,518	0	Quarter-finals
HK 36 Skalica	Skalica	Skalica Ice Stadium	4,100	0	Quarter-finals
HK Dukla Trenčín	Trenčín	Pavol Demitra Ice Stadium	6,150	3	Quarter-finals
HK Poprad	Poprad	Poprad Ice Stadium	4,050	0	Quarter-finals
MsHK Žilina	Žilina	Garmin Arena	6,200	1	9th
MHC Mountfield	Martin	Martin Ice Stadium	4,200	0	10th
HK Orange 20	Bratislava	Vladimír Dzurilla Ice Stadium	3,500	–	–

== Regular season ==
=== Standings ===
Po.	Club	GP	W	OTW/SOW	OTL/SOL	L	GF	GA	PTS
1.	HC Košice	56	39	4	0	13	174	98	125
2.	HK Nitra	56	32	5	7	12	192	114	113
3.	HC ’05 Banská Bystrica	56	29	3	7	17	167	142	100
4.	ŠHK 37 Piešťany	56	21	11	3	21	147	139	88
5.	HK Poprad	56	22	7	6	21	167	153	86
6.	HK 36 Skalica	56	24	1	7	24	168	186	81
7.	HKm Zvolen	56	17	6	7	26	138	153	70
8.	MHC Mountfield	56	15	7	7	27	120	161	66
9.	HK Dukla Trenčín	56	13	7	9	27	142	174	62
10.	MsHK Žilina	56	16	4	4	32	145	204	60
11.	HK Orange 20	20	3	4	2	11	41	77	19

Clinced Play-off Relegation series

Key - GP: Games played, W: Wins, OTW/SOW: Overtime/Shootout wins, OTL/SOL: Overtime/Shootout losses, L: Losses, GF: Goals for, GA: Goals against, PTS: Points.

=== Statistics ===
==== Scoring leaders ====
GP = Games played; G = Goals; A = Assists; Pts = Points; +/– = Plus/minus; PIM = Penalty minutes

Player	Team	GP	G	A	Pts	+/–	PIM
(Slovakia) Jozef Stümpel	HK Nitra	54	16	51	67	+25	12
(Slovakia) Roman Tománek	HK Nitra	53	31	33	64	+29	26
(Slovakia) Jaroslav Markovič	MHC Martin	56	25	29	54	–11	40
(Czech Republic) Kamil Brabenec	HKm Zvolen	53	16	36	52	+5	89
(Slovakia) René Školiak	HK 36 Skalica	56	16	36	52	+2	90
(Slovakia) Roman Tomas	MsHK Žilina	44	37	13	50	–9	60
(Slovakia) Peter Klouda	MsHK Žilina	56	11	39	50	–6	32
(Slovakia) Adam Lapšanský	HK Poprad	52	28	19	47	+6	20
(Slovakia) Peter Bartoš	HC Košice	56	14	33	47	+28	55
(Czech Republic) Petr Obdržálek	HK 36 Skalica	56	27	19	46	–4	8
(Slovakia) Gabriel Spilar	HC Košice	52	25	21	46	+22	6
(Slovakia) Richard Jenčík	HC Košice	55	24	22	46	+22	8
(Slovakia) Arne Kroták	HK Poprad	52	18	28	46	+2	36

==== Leading goaltenders ====
These are the leaders in GAA among goaltenders that have played at least 1200 minutes.

GP = Games played; TOI = Time on ice (minutes); GA = Goals against; Sv% = Save percentage; GAA = Goals against average

Player	Team	GP	TOI	GA	Sv%	GAA
(Czech Republic) Alexandr Hylák	HC Košice	36	2078:38	65	.932	1.88
(Slovenia) Robert Kristan	HK Nitra	45	2607:40	93	.928	2.14
(Slovakia) Tomáš Tomek	ŠHK 37 Piešťany	44	2530:12	101	.924	2.40
(United States) Zane Kalemba	HC '05 Banská Bystrica	49	2876:37	116	.930	2.42
(Slovakia) Marek Šimko	HKm Zvolen	56	3370:32	143	.920	2.55

== Play-off ==
The seeding in Play-off is based on the ranking in Regular season. All Play-off rounds are played in the best-of-seven format, with the higher seeded team having the home advantage for the possible seventh game.

=== Playoff bracket ===
Quarterfinals
1.	HC Košice	4
8.	MHC Mountfield	0
4.	ŠHK 37 Piešťany	4
5.	HK Poprad	1
2.	HK Nitra	4
7.	HKm Zvolen^{†}	0
3.	HC ’05 B. Bystrica	4
6.	HK 36 Skalica	2

Semifinals
1.	HC Košice	4
4.	ŠHK 37 Piešťany	2
2.	HK Nitra	4
3.	HC ’05 B. Bystrica	1

Finals
1.	HC Košice	4
2.	HK Nitra	3

^{†} Defending champion

=== Quarterfinals ===
==== (1) HC Košice vs. (8) MHC Mountfield ====
March 8, 2014	HC Košice	6–1	MHC Mountfield	Steel Aréna	Recap
Peter Bartoš – 7:33; Jiří Bicek – 24:44 PP; Oliver Jokeľ – 42:42; Radek Deyl – 44:51 PP; Marek Bartánus – 47:40 PP; Oliver Jokeľ 2 – 57:05 SH		Scoring stats	26:45 SH – Peter Galamboš
Rastislav Staňa – 19/20		Goalie stats	36/42 – Michal Dzubina

March 9, 2014	HC Košice	3–2	MHC Mountfield	Steel Aréna	Recap
Matej Češík – 15:37; Marek Bartánus – 30:13 PP; Pavol Skalický – 47:59		Scoring stats	26:42 – Lukáš Finstrele; 59:14 – Jakub Suja
Rastislav Staňa – 31/33		Goalie stats	39/42 – Michal Dzubina

March 12, 2014	MHC Mountfield	0–1	HC Košice	Martin Ice Stadium	Recap
		Scoring stats	19:48 – Matej Češík
Michal Dzubina – 29/30		Goalie stats	31/31 – Rastislav Staňa

March 13, 2014	MHC Mountfield	3–4	GWS	HC Košice	Martin Ice Stadium	Recap
Milan Kolena – 26:22; Lukáš Matejka – 41:02; 55:50 – Milan Kolena 2		Scoring stats		12:44 SH – Peter Sojčík; 17:13 PP –Richard Jenčík; 22:04 PS – Peter Sojčík 2 GWS – Peter Bartoš
Michal Dzubina – 26/30		Goalie stats		31/34 – Rastislav Staňa

Košice won the series 4 – 0

==== (2) HK Nitra vs. (7) HKm Zvolen ====
March 8, 2014	HK Nitra	3–1	HKm Zvolen	Nitra Aréna	Recap
Jozef Stümpel – 20:40; Jakub Ručkay – 37:28 PP; Henrich Ručkay – 53:52 PP		Scoring stats	14:37 PP – Jaroslav Obšut
Robert Kristan – 27/28		Goalie stats	28/31 – Marek Šimko

March 9, 2014	HK Nitra	5–0	HKm Zvolen	Nitra Aréna	Recap
Roman Tománek – 08:54; Roman Tománek 2 – 11:12; Lukáš Novák – 17:44 PP2; Richard Lelkeš – 23:21; Henrich Ručkay – 57:21		Scoring stats
Robert Kristan – 21/21		Goalie stats	41/46 – Marek Šimko

March 12, 2014	HKm Zvolen	2–3	HK Nitra	Steiger Aréna	Recap
Tomáš Škvaridlo – 08:41 PP; 33:44 – Peter Hraško		Scoring stats	31:01 – Richard Lelkeš; 45:00– Miroslav Kováčik; 45:41 – Martin Segľa
Marek Šimko – 30/33		Goalie stats	26/28 – Robert Kristan

March 13, 2014	HKm Zvolen	0–2	HK Nitra	Steiger Aréna	Recap
		Scoring stats	14:54 – Edmund Piačka; 15:27 – Roman Tománek
Marek Šimko – 38/40		Goalie stats	27/27 – Robert Kristan

Nitra won the series 4 – 0

==== (3) HC '05 Banská Bystrica vs. (6) HK 36 Skalica ====
March 10, 2014	HC '05 Banská Bystrica	3–1	HK 36 Skalica	Banská Bystrica Stadium	Recap
Radomír Heizer – 21:40; Chris Saracino – 23:50; Chris Saracino 2 – 26:14 PP		Scoring stats	49:57 – Tibor Kutálek
Zane Kalemba – 32/33		Goalie stats	32/35 – Miroslav Lipovský

March 11, 2014	HC '05 Banská Bystrica	4–1	HK 36 Skalica	Banská Bystrica Stadium	Recap
Petr Kafka – 06:10; Mário Luntner – 55:04; Tomáš Zigo – 56:34; Chris Saracino – 59:09 SH		Scoring stats	21:07 PP – Petr Obdržálek
Zane Kalemba – 49/50		Goalie stats	26/29 – Miroslav Lipovský

March 14, 2014	HK 36 Skalica	4–2	HC '05 Banská Bystrica	Skalica Ice Stadium	Recap
David Stieler – 22:12; Bruno Mráz – 26:07; Miroslav Preisinger – 28:32; Tomáš Mikúš – 55:13		Scoring stats	03:13 – Patrick White; 45:46 – Michal Hudec
Miroslav Lipovský – 33/35		Goalie stats	23/27 – Zane Kalemba

March 15, 2014	HK 36 Skalica	4–1	HC '05 Banská Bystrica	Skalica Ice Stadium	Recap
Radoslav Kropáč – 05:23; Tibor Kutálek – 20:54; Radoslav Kropáč 2 – 25:31 PS; Petr Obdržálek – 39:23		Scoring stats	43:39 PP – Michal Hudec
Miroslav Lipovský – 26/27		Goalie stats	27/31 – Zane Kalemba; 10/10 – Andrej Košarišťan

March 17, 2014	HC '05 Banská Bystrica	5–0	HK 36 Skalica	Banská Bystrica Stadium	Recap
Richard Rapáč – 07:44 PP; Tomáš Zigo – 11:14; Radomír Heizer – 14:38 PP; Patrick White – 15:25; Mário Luntner – 18:41		Scoring stats
Zane Kalemba – 32/32		Goalie stats	9/13 – Miroslav Lipovský; 20/21 – Patrik Romančík

March 19, 2014	HK 36 Skalica	1–2	HC '05 Banská Bystrica	Skalica Ice Stadium	Recap
Martin Vyrúbalík – 05:00		Scoring stats	14:22 – Lukáš Handlovský; 46:23 – Patrick White
Miroslav Lipovský – 29/31		Goalie stats	20/21 – Zane Kalemba

Banská Bystrica won the series 4 – 2

==== (4) ŠHK 37 Piešťany vs. (5) HK Poprad ====
March 10, 2014	ŠHK 37 Piešťany	2–1	HK Poprad	EASTON Aréna	Recap
Michal Peško – 24:24 PP; Matej Hamrák – 27:52		Scoring stats	18:59 – Adam Lapšanský
Tomáš Tomek – 24/25		Goalie stats	25/27 Edgars Masaļskis

March 11, 2014	ŠHK 37 Piešťany	2–1	HK Poprad	EASTON Aréna	Recap
Václav Stupka – 09:09; Tibor Melichárek – 10:26		Scoring stats	42:18 – Štefan Fabian
Tomáš Tomek – 31/32		Goalie stats	21/23 – Edgars Masaļskis

March 14, 2014	HK Poprad	5–2	ŠHK 37 Piešťany	Poprad Ice Stadium	Recap
Juris Štāls – 00:52; Martin Belluš – 13:24; Juris Štāls 2 –16:07; Samuel Mlynarovič – 47:39; Adam Lapšanský – 57:31 PP		Scoring stats	20:21 – Richard Filip; 39:26 – Matej Mišura
Edgars Masaļskis – 34/36		Goalie stats	6/9 – Tomáš Tomek; 13/15 – Martin Šúrek

March 15, 2014	HK Poprad	0–3	ŠHK 37 Piešťany	Poprad Ice Stadium	Recap
		Scoring stats	23:58 – Vladimír Nemec; 36:15 – Václav Stupka; 38:37 – Ján Románek
Edgars Masaļskis – 21/24		Goalie stats	38/38 – Martin Šúrek

March 17, 2014	ŠHK 37 Piešťany	3–0	HK Poprad	EASTON Aréna	Recap
Matej Hamrák – 14:31; Matej Mišura – 52:49 PP; Patrik Lušňák – 56:56		Scoring stats
Martin Šúrek – 34/34		Goalie stats	28/31 – Edgars Masaļskis

Piešťany won the series 4 – 1

=== Semifinals ===
==== (1) HC Košice vs. (4) ŠHK 37 Piešťany ====
March 24, 2014	HC Košice	4–1	ŠHK 37 Piešťany	Steel Aréna	Recap
Radek Deyl 21:26; Gabriel Spilár – 23:40; Peter Bartoš – 30:13; Tomáš Hrnka – 52:35 PP		Scoring stats	35:05 – Václav Stupka
Rastislav Staňa – 18/19		Goalie stats	28/32 – Martin Šúrek

March 25, 2014	HC Košice	3–5	ŠHK 37 Piešťany	Steel Aréna	Recap
Tomáš Hrnka – 15:12; Gabriel Spilár – 32:23; Peter Bartoš – 41:17		Scoring stats	04:14 – Matej Hamrák; 11:40 – Marcel Holovič; 14:44 – Martin Chylo; 18:04 PP – Patrik Lušňák; 33:35 – Martin Škadra
Rastislav Staňa – 8/12; Alexandr Hylák – 21/22		Goalie stats	34/37 – Martin Šúrek

March 28, 2014	ŠHK 37 Piešťany	2–0	HC Košice	EASTON Aréna	Recap
Václav Stupka – 12:08; Václav Stupka 2 – 59:44 EN		Scoring stats	No scoring
Martin Šúrek – 34/34		Goalie stats	29/30 – Rastislav Staňa

March 29, 2014	ŠHK 37 Piešťany	1–4	HC Košice	EASTON Aréna	Recap
08:48 – Richard Jenčík; 14:30 – Matej Češík; 34:23 – Marek Bartánus; 34:38 – Oliver Jokeľ		Scoring stats	Tibor Melichárek – 06:38 PP
Martin Šúrek – 22/26		Goalie stats	33/34 – Rastislav Staňa

April 1, 2014	HC Košice	3–0	ŠHK 37 Piešťany	Steel Aréna

April 3, 2014	ŠHK 37 Piešťany	1–2	HC Košice	EASTON Aréna

Košice won the series 4 – 2

==== (2) HK Nitra vs. (3) HC '05 Banská Bystrica ====
March 26, 2014	HK Nitra	6–2	HC '05 Banská Bystrica	Nitra Aréna	Recap
Jakub Ručkay – 05:26 PP; Jozef Stümpel – 27:53; Henrich Ručkay – 32:31 PP; Miroslav Kováčik – 34:04; Roman Tománek – 42:05 PP; Henrich Ručkay 2 – 47:07 PP		Scoring stats	30:18 – Keven Veilleux; 31:04 – Radomír Heizer
Robert Kristan – 15/17		Goalie stats	35/41 – Zane Kalemba; 6/6 – Andrej Košarišťan

March 27, 2014	HK Nitra	4–2	HC '05 Banská Bystrica	Nitra Aréna	Recap
Roman Tománek – 10:48 PP2; Michal Novák – 22:17; Jozef Stümpel – 31:29; Peter König – 35:13 PP2		Scoring stats	05:54 – Keven Veilleux; 40:14 PP – Patrick White
Robert Kristan – 27/29		Goalie stats	37/41 – Zane Kalemba

March 30, 2014	HC '05 Banská Bystrica	6–4	HK Nitra	Banská Bystrica Stadium	Recap
Petr Kafka – 01:15; Petr Kafka 2 –12:38 PP; Petr Kafka 3 – 21:40 PP; Petr Kafka 4 – 26:20; Mário Luntner – 42:30; Tomáš Matoušek – 59:07		Scoring stats	18:29 – Martin Segľa; 35:18 – Lukáš Novák; 39:37 – Jakub Ručkay; 44:02 – Richard Lelkeš
Zane Kalemba – 42/46		Goalie stats	15/19 – Robert Kristan; 11/13 – Vlastimil Lakosil

March 31, 2014	HC '05 Banská Bystrica	2–5	HK Nitra	Banská Bystrica Stadium

April 2, 2014	HK Nitra	4–3	OT	HC '05 Banská Bystrica	Nitra Aréna

Nitra won the series 4 – 1

=== Finals ===
==== (1) HC Košice vs. (2) HK Nitra ====
April 9, 2014	HC Košice	4–3	GWS	HK Nitra	Steel Aréna	Recap

April 10, 2014	HC Košice	1–2	HK Nitra	Steel Aréna	Recap

April 13, 2014	HK Nitra	3–4	OT	HC Košice	Nitra Aréna	Recap

April 14, 2014	HK Nitra	3–2	HC Košice	Nitra Aréna	Recap

April 17, 2014	HC Košice	2–1	GWS	HK Nitra	Steel Aréna	Recap

April 19, 2014	HK Nitra	3–1	HC Košice	Nitra Aréna	Recap

April 21, 2014	HC Košice	6–0	HK Nitra	Steel Aréna	Recap

Košice won the series 4 – 3 and became Champions

=== Statistics ===
==== Scoring leaders ====
GP = Games played; G = Goals; A = Assists; Pts = Points; +/– = Plus/minus; PIM = Penalty minutes

Player	Team	GP	G	A	Pts	+/–	PIM
(Slovakia) Jozef Stümpel	HK Nitra	9	3	11	14	+	12
(Slovakia) Roman Tománek	HK Nitra	9	6	7	13	+	8
(Slovakia) Richard Jenčík	HC Košice	10	5	7	12	+	2
(Slovakia) Lukáš Novák	HK Nitra	8	6	4	10	+	35
(Czech Republic) Petr Kafka	HC '05 Banská Bystrica	11	6	4	10	+	4
(Czech Republic) Václav Stupka	ŠHK 37 Piešťany	11	5	4	9	+	0
(Slovakia) Peter Bartoš	HC Košice	10	4	5	9	+	52
(Slovakia) Richard Lelkeš	HK Nitra	9	6	2	8	+	4
(Slovakia) Henrich Ručkay	HK Nitra	6	4	4	8	+	2

== Relegation series ==
Relegation series will be played between MsHK Žilina, the 10th team in regular season, and HC 46 Bardejov, the winner of 1.liga. The winner of best-of-seven series will play in Extraliga in 2014–15 season.

=== MsHK Žilina vs. HC 46 Bardejov ===
March 20, 2014	MsHK Žilina	3–1	HC 46 Bardejov	Garmin Arena

March 21, 2014	MsHK Žilina	4–3	HC 46 Bardejov	Garmin Arena

March 24, 2014	HC 46 Bardejov	4–3	OT	MsHK Žilina	Bardejov Ice Stadium

March 25, 2014	HC 46 Bardejov	1–2	MsHK Žilina	Bardejov Ice Stadium

March 27, 2014	MsHK Žilina	6–2	HC 46 Bardejov	Garmin Arena

Žilina won the series 4 – 1 and will play in Extraliga in the next season

== Attendance ==
Team name	Arena	Capacity	Attendance	%
HC Košice	Steel Aréna	8,378	4,008▼	48%
HC ’05 Banská Bystrica	Banská Bystrica Ice Stadium	3,518	1,514▼	43%
HK 36 Skalica	Skalica Ice Stadium	4,100	1,435▼	35%
HK Dukla Trenčín	Pavol Demitra Ice Stadium	6,150	1,426▼	23%
HK Nitra	Nitra Aréna	3,600	2,757▲	77%
HK Orange 20	Vladimír Dzurilla Ice Stadium	3,500	332	9%
HK Poprad	Poprad Ice Stadium	4,050	1,391▼	34%
HKm Zvolen	Zvolen Ice Stadium	7,038	1,560▼	23%
MHC Mountfield	Martin Ice Stadium	4,200	1,481▲	35%
MsHK Žilina	Garmin Arena	6,200	1,203▲	19%
ŠHK 37 Piešťany	EASTON Aréna	3,050	1,442▼	47%

== Final rankings ==
Gold medal	Košice
Silver medal	Nitra
Bronze medal	Banská Bystrica
4	Piešťany
5	Poprad
6	Skalica
7	Zvolen
8	Martin
9	Trenčín
10	Žilina
