= 2012–13 Slovak Extraliga season =

- League: Slovak Extraliga
- Sport: Ice hockey
- Duration: 13 September 2012 – 15 April 2013
- Average attendance: 2,018

Regular season
- League Champion: HKm Zvolen
- Top scorer: Žigmund Pálffy (HK 36 Skalica)

Playoffs

Finals
- Champions: HKm Zvolen
- Runners-up: HC Košice

Slovak Extraliga seasons
- 2011–12 2013–14

The 2012–13 Slovak Extraliga season was the 20th season of the Slovak Extraliga, the highest level of ice hockey in Slovakia.

== Regular season ==
=== Standings ===
Po.	Club	GP	W	OTW/SOW	OTL/SOL	L	GF	GA	PTS
1.	HKm Zvolen	56	32	8	3	13	203	145	115
2.	HC Košice	56	32	4	5	15	214	138	109
3.	HK Nitra	56	29	8	4	15	187	139	107
4.	ŠHK 37 Piešťany	56	25	3	14	14	146	138	95
5.	HK 36 Skalica	56	27	4	2	23	208	179	91
6.	HK Dukla Trenčín	56	22	7	6	21	165	161	86
7.	HK Poprad	56	22	6	5	23	188	177	83
8.	HC ’05 Banská Bystrica	56	20	6	4	26	153	186	76
9.	MsHK Žilina	56	13	3	8	32	135	194	53
10.	MHC Mountfield	56	12	5	3	36	117	205	49
11.	HK Orange 20	20	2	0	0	18	34	88	6

clinched playoff spot
will play in relegation series

Key - GP: Games played, W: Wins, OTW/SOW: Overtime/Shootout wins, OTL/SOL: Overtime/Shootout losses, L: Losses, GF: Goals for, GA: Goals against, PTS: Points.

=== Statistics ===
==== Scoring leaders ====
GP = Games played; G = Goals; A = Assists; Pts = Points; +/– = Plus/minus; PIM = Penalty minutes

Player	Team	GP	G	A	Pts	+/–	PIM
(Slovakia) Žigmund Pálffy	HK 36 Skalica	39	26	47	73	+40	103
(Slovakia) Lukáš Jurík	HKm Zvolen	54	30	37	67	+37	56
(Slovakia) Richard Jenčík	HC Košice	56	23	43	66	+46	14
(Slovakia) Marcel Haščák	HC Košice	51	31	33	64	+30	48
(Slovakia) René Školiak	HK 36 Skalica	54	15	48	63	+27	92
(Czech Republic) Kamil Brabenec	HKm Zvolen	55	23	35	58	+38	68
(Slovakia) Michal Chovan	HKm Zvolen	41	14	43	57	+32	62
(Slovakia) Peter Klouda	HK Poprad	53	10	45	55	+14	48
(Slovakia) Lukáš Hvila	HK Poprad	55	30	23	53	+30	54
(Slovakia) Roman Tománek	HK Nitra	55	34	18	52	+36	24
(Slovakia) Michael Vandas	HK Poprad	49	21	31	52	+33	83

==== Leading goaltenders ====
These are the leaders in GAA among goaltenders that have played at least 1200 minutes.

GP = Games played; TOI = Time on ice (minutes); GA = Goals against; Sv% = Save percentage; GAA = Goals against average

Player	Team	GP	TOI	GA	Sv%	GAA
(Slovakia) Tomáš Tomek	ŠHK 37 Piešťany	52	3106:07	111	.932	2.14
(Slovakia) Miroslav Lipovský	HK 36 Skalica	23	1388:38	53	.930	2.29
(Czech Republic) Alexandr Hylák	HC Košice	52	3052:59	120	.919	2.36
(Slovakia) Marek Šimko	HKm Zvolen	54	3278:37	134	.917	2.45
(Slovakia) Marek Laco	HK Nitra	43	2536:33	113	.916	2.67

== Playoffs ==
=== Playoff bracket ===
Quarterfinals
1.	HKm Zvolen	4
8.	HC ’05 Banská Bystrica	1
4.	ŠHK 37 Piešťany	4
5.	HK 36 Skalica	3
2.	HC Košice	4
7.	HK Poprad	3
3.	HK Nitra	4
6.	HK Dukla Trenčín	0

Semifinals
1.	HKm Zvolen	4
4.	ŠHK 37 Piešťany	3
2.	HC Košice	4
3.	HK Nitra	1

Finals
1.	HKm Zvolen	4
2.	HC Košice	1

=== Quarterfinals (best-of-seven) ===
- Zvolen – Banská Bystrica 4–1 (1–2, 2–1, 4–0, 3–2, 3–2PS)
- Piešťany – Skalica 4–3 (5–1, 1–4, 3–2PS, 0–4, 4–5, 3–0, 4–1)
- Košice – Poprad 4–3 (2–1, 2–1, 2–4, 3–6, 3–2, 0–3, 3–1)
- Nitra – Trenčín 4–0 (2–1, 2–0, 4–0, 4–1)

=== Semifinals (best-of-seven) ===
- Zvolen – Piešťany 4–3 (2–1, 3–4PS, 3–2PS, 1–6, 2–1PS, 0–4, 5–0)
- Košice – Nitra 4–1 (3–5, 2–1PS, 7–4, 3–2PS, 6–3)

=== Finals (best-of-seven) ===
- Zvolen – Košice 4–1 (2–1PS, 2–1, 3–2, 2–6, 2–1)

=== Playoff statistics ===
==== Playoff scoring leaders ====
Player	Team	GP	G	A	Pts	+/–	PIM
(Slovakia) Richard Jenčík	HC Košice	17	13	5	18	+11	2
(Slovakia) Dušan Pašek	HC Košice	17	9	9	18	+10	10
(Slovakia) Marcel Haščák	HC Košice	17	4	13	17	+13	36
(Slovakia) Andrej Podkonický	HKm Zvolen	17	6	6	12	+13	14
(Slovakia) Roman Tománek	HK Nitra	9	8	3	11	+8	6
(Czech Republic) Kamil Brabenec	HKm Zvolen	17	7	4	11	+12	12
(Slovakia) René Školiak	HK 36 Skalica	7	6	4	10	+3	10
(Slovakia) Samir Saliji	ŠHK 37 Piešťany	12	5	5	10	-4	2
(Slovakia) Marek Slovák	HC Košice	16	4	6	10	+1	14
(Slovakia) Peter Zuzin	HKm Zvolen	17	4	6	10	+5	0
(Slovakia) Jakub Ručkay	ŠHK 37 Piešťany	14	3	7	10	+6	18
(Slovakia) Gabriel Spilar	HC Košice	14	1	9	10	0	14

== Relegation round ==
In the relegation round the 10th place team MHC Martin played against the 1.Liga champion HC 46 Bardejov.

=== MHC Martin vs. HC 46 Bardejov ===
March 19, 2013	MHC Martin	1–2	HC 46 Bardejov	Martin Ice Stadium	Recap
Andrej Novotný – 47:44 – PP		Scoring stats	21:31 – Dancsák Juraj; 36:15 – Ladislav Ščurko

March 20, 2013	MHC Martin	4–3	HC 46 Bardejov	Martin Ice Stadium	Recap
Tomáš Petruška – 18:26 – PP; Andrej Themár – 30:10 – SH; Tomáš Petruška – 48:07 – PP; Filip Vaško 57:54		Scoring stats	34:11 – Martin Krčula; 44:48 – Marcel Baláž; 47:19 – Tomáš Stríž

March 23, 2013	HC 46 Bardejov	2–4	MHC Martin	Bardejov Ice Stadium	Recap
Marek Nagy – 15:17; Ladislav Ščurko – 42:41 – PP		Scoring stats	31:40 – Tomáš Petruška; 35:02 – PP2 – Andrej Themár; 57:19 – Michal Važan; 57:49 – PP – Tomáš Petruška

March 24, 2013	HC 46 Bardejov	4–2	MHC Martin	Bardejov Ice Stadium	Recap
Igor Halás 03:10; 34:53 – PP – Martin Tkáč; Juraj Dancsák – 46:42; Ladislav Ščurko – 59:18		Scoring stats	06:30 – Andrej Themár; 57:06 – PP –Fujerík Dominik

March 27, 2013	MHC Martin	4–2	HC 46 Bardejov	Martin Ice Stadium	Recap
Róbert Pukalovič – 16:50 – PP; Milan Kolena – 40:58; Važan Michal – 56:46 – SH; Andrej Themár – 49:17 – PP		Scoring stats	25:47 – Ladislav Ščurko; 52:22 – Marek Nagy

March 29, 2013	HC 46 Bardejov	3–1	MHC Martin	Bardejov Ice Stadium	Recap
Ľubomír Sabol – 01:51 – PP; Ľubomír Sabol – 41:17; Erik Belušár – 55:19		Scoring stats	49:30 – PP – Michal Važan

March 31, 2013	MHC Martin	4–3	GWS	HC 46 Bardejov	Martin Ice Stadium	Recap
Michal Dvořák – 14:22; Martin Hollý – 45:30 – PP; Martin Hollý – 55:00; Andrej Novotný – GWS		Scoring stats		06:06 Marcel Baláž; 38:52 Ladislav Ščurko; 41:04 Ľubomír Sabol

Martin won series 4 – 3

== Attendance ==
Team name	Arena	Capacity	Attendance	%
HC Košice	Steel Aréna	8,378	4,060	49%
HC ’05 Banská Bystrica	Banská Bystrica Ice Stadium	3,518	1,660	47%
HK 36 Skalica	Skalica Ice Stadium	4,100	1,910	47%
HK Dukla Trenčín	Pavol Demitra Ice Stadium	6,150	1,801	29%
HK Nitra	Nitra Aréna	3,600	2,593	72%
HK Orange 20	Vladimír Dzurilla Ice Stadium	3,500	—N/a	—N/a
HK Poprad	Poprad Ice Stadium	4,050	1,500	37%
HKm Zvolen	Zvolen Ice Stadium	7,038	2,286	33%
MHC Mountfield	Martin Ice Stadium	4,200	1,329	32%
MsHK Žilina	Garmin Arena	6,200	1,127	18%
ŠHK 37 Piešťany	EASTON Aréna	3,050	2,204	72%

== All-Stars Team ==
Goaltender	Tomáš Tomek; ŠHK 37 Piešťany		
Defencemen	Peter König; HK Nitra		Martin Štrbák; HC Košice
Forwards	Marcel Haščák; HC Košice	Lukáš Jurík; HKm Zvolen	Žigmund Pálffy; HK 36 Skalica

== Final rankings ==
Gold medal	Zvolen
Silver medal	Košice
Bronze medal	Nitra
4	Piešťany
5	Skalica
6	Trenčín
7	Poprad
8	Banská Bystrica
9	Žilina
10	Martin
