= Václav Stupka =

Slovak ice hockey left winger

- Born: 28 July 1986 (age 38); Trnava, Czechoslovakia
- Height: 5 ft 10 in (178 cm)
- Weight: 196 lb (89 kg; 14 st 0 lb)
- Position: Left wing
- Shoots: Left
- Slovak team Former teams: HK Skalica; HK Trnava; MsHK Žilina; ŠHK 37 Piešťany; HC Košice; Glasgow Clan; HC '05 Banská Bystrica; HKM Zvolen; HC Nové Zámky
- Playing career: 2005–present

Václav Stupka (born 28 July 1986) is a Slovak professional ice hockey left winger currently playing for HK Skalica of the Slovak 1. Liga.

== Career ==
Stupka began his career with his local team HK Trnava of the Slovak 1. Liga, making his pro debut for the team during the 2004–05 season. In 2010, Stupka moved to MsHK Žilina of the Tipsport Liga. After two seasons with Žilina, he joined ŠHK 37 Piešťany.

On 30 June 2014 Stupka joined HC Košice but returned to Piešťany on 8 January 2015. He then rejoined Žilina in July 2015 where he spent the next three seasons.

On 4 September 2018 Stupka moved to the Elite Ice Hockey League in the United Kingdom, signing for Scottish team Glasgow Clan on an initial one-month contract before signing an extension to remain with the team for the remainder of the 2018–19 EIHL season. On 16 August 2019 Stupka returned to the Tipsport Liga with HC Nové Zámky.

== Career statistics ==
=== Regular season and playoffs ===
			Regular season					Playoffs
Season	Team	League	GP	G	A	Pts	PIM	GP	G	A	Pts	PIM
2003–04	HK Trnava	Slovak-Jr.	11	4	2	6	2	—	—	—	—	—
2004–05	HK Trnava	Slovak-Jr.	55	15	27	42	22	—	—	—	—	—
2004–05	HK Trnava	Slovak.1	1	0	0	0	0	—	—	—	—	—
2005–06	HK Trnava	Slovak-Jr.	39	14	16	30	26	6	0	0	0	2
2005–06	HK Trnava	Slovak.1	17	2	1	3	0	—	—	—	—	—
2006–07	HK Trnava	Slovak.1	40	12	11	23	20	—	—	—	—	—
2007–08	HK Trnava	Slovak.1	40	34	13	47	12	14	3	6	9	12
2008–09	HK Trnava	Slovak.1	44	25	21	46	32	6	5	0	5	2
2009–10	HK Trnava	Slovak.1	37	24	17	41	98	9	1	5	6	6
2010–11	MsHK Žilina	Slovak	57	14	8	22	14	—	—	—	—	—
2011–12	MsHK Žilina	Slovak	53	3	6	9	45	5	1	1	2	2
2011–12	HK Trnava	Slovak.1	1	0	0	0	0	—	—	—	—	—
2012–13	ŠHK 37 Piešťany	Slovak	56	9	15	24	10	14	4	1	5	2
2013–14	ŠHK 37 Piešťany	Slovak	44	10	15	25	16	11	5	4	9	0
2014–15	HC Košice	Slovak	40	0	5	5	0	—	—	—	—	—
2014–15	ŠHK 37 Piešťany	Slovak	15	2	6	8	2	6	1	0	1	0
2015–16	MsHK Žilina	Slovak	55	13	20	33	28	4	1	0	1	0
2016–17	MsHK Žilina	Slovak	47	14	26	40	26	11	4	2	6	16
2017–18	MsHK Žilina	Slovak	55	6	13	19	16	6	1	1	2	2
2018–19	Glasgow Clan	EIHL	60	14	27	41	18	2	0	1	1	0
2019–20	HC Nové Zámky	Slovak	39	22	17	39	26	—	—	—	—	—
2019–20	HC '05 Banská Bystrica	Slovak	8	2	6	8	4	—	—	—	—	—
2020–21	HKM Zvolen	Slovak	44	12	13	25	22	14	4	3	7	8
2021–22	HKM Zvolen	Slovak	25	7	5	12	4	6	0	0	0	0
2022–23	HKM Zvolen	Slovak	41	8	9	17	29	16	4	0	4	4
Slovak totals			579	122	164	286	242	93	25	12	37	34

== Awards and honors ==
Award	Year
Slovak
Champion	2021
