= Radomír Heizer =

Slovak ice hockey player

- Born: 23 November 1987 (age 38) Gelnica, Slovakia
- Height: 6 ft 2 in (188 cm)
- Weight: 194 lb (88 kg; 13 st 12 lb)
- Position: Centre
- Shoots: Left
- Ligue Magnus team Former teams: Nice hockey Côte d'Azur; HK Spišská Nová Ves; HC ’05 Banská Bystrica; HC Karlovy Vary; Herlev Eagles; HK Poprad; MHC Martin
- National team: Slovakia
- Playing career: 2005–present

Radomír Heizer (born 23 November 1987) is a Slovak professional ice hockey player who currently plays for Nice hockey Côte d'Azur of the Ligue Magnus.

Heizer previously played in the Slovak Extraliga for HK Spišská Nová Ves, HC ’05 Banská Bystrica, HK Poprad and MHC Martin. He also played in the Czech Extraliga for HC Karlovy Vary and the Metal Ligaen for the Herlev Eagles.

== Career statistics ==
=== Regular season and playoffs ===
			Regular season					Playoffs
Season	Team	League	GP	G	A	Pts	PIM	GP	G	A	Pts	PIM
2005–06	HK Spišská Nová Ves	SVK2	—	—	—	—	—	3	0	0	0	0
2006–07	HK Spišská Nová Ves	SVK2	18	2	4	6	2	6	0	0	0	2
2007–08	HK Spišská Nová Ves	SVK2	40	7	13	20	18	14	1	2	3	6
2008–09	HK Spišská Nová Ves	SVK2	44	16	30	46	12	—	—	—	—	—
2009–10	HK Spišská Nová Ves	SVK	46	2	11	13	16	—	—	—	—	—
2010–11	HC ’05 Banská Bystrica	SVK	38	1	3	4	10	—	—	—	—	—
2010–11	HK Spišská Nová Ves	SVK2	9	1	5	6	14	6	0	2	2	2
2011–12	HC ’05 Banská Bystrica	SVK	52	5	9	14	14	5	0	2	2	2
2012–13	HC ’05 Banská Bystrica	SVK	45	15	13	28	34	—	—	—	—	—
2013–14	HC ’05 Banská Bystrica	SVK	56	16	29	45	32	8	4	2	6	6
2014–15	HC Karlovy Vary	CZE	33	2	4	6	10	—	—	—	—	—
2014–15	HC ’05 Banská Bystrica	SVK	8	2	6	8	2	16	1	5	6	6
2015–16	Herlev Eagles	DEN	7	0	2	2	0	—	—	—	—	—
2015–16	HK Poprad	SVK	41	8	24	32	16	5	1	1	2	4
2016–17	MHC Martin	SVK	55	8	26	34	30	11	2	3	5	6
2017–18	HK Poprad	SVK	55	14	9	23	12	4	0	1	1	2
SVK totals			396	71	130	201	166	49	8	14	22	26
