= Tibor Melichárek =

Slovak professional ice hockey player (born 1976)

- Born: November 21, 1976 (age 48); Topoľčany, Czechoslovakia
- Height: 6 ft 0 in (183 cm)
- Weight: 194 lb (88 kg; 13 st 12 lb)
- Position: Forward
- Shot: Right
- Played for: HC VTJ Telvis Topoľčany; HC Slovan Bratislava; HK Dukla Trencin; SHK 37 Piestany; HC Sparta Praha; HC Ocelari Trinec; HC Ceske Budejovice; MHK Dubnica
- National team: Slovakia
- NHL draft: Undrafted
- Playing career: 1995–2017

Tibor Melichárek (21 November 1976) is a Slovak professional ice hockey player.

He played with clubs including HC Slovan Bratislava in the Slovak Extraliga.

== Career statistics ==
			Regular season					Playoffs
Season	Team	League	GP	G	A	Pts	PIM	GP	G	A	Pts	PIM
1995–96	HC VTJ Telvis Topoľčany	Slovak2	48	18	8	26	8	—	—	—	—	—
1996–97	HC VTJ Telvis Topoľčany	Slovak2	48	19	15	34	10	—	—	—	—	—
1997–98	HC VTJ Telvis Topoľčany	Slovak2	29	16	9	25	28	—	—	—	—	—
1998–99	HC VTJ Telvis Topoľčany	Slovak2	36	12	15	27	46	—	—	—	—	—
1999–00	HC VTJ Telvis Topoľčany	Slovak2	44	30	21	51	12	—	—	—	—	—
2000–01	HC Slovan Bratislava	Slovak	50	13	10	23	12	—	—	—	—	—
2001–02	HK Dukla Trencin	Slovak	51	7	10	17	12	—	—	—	—	—
2002–03	HK Dukla Trencin	Slovak	54	13	7	20	6	—	—	—	—	—
2003–04	HK Dukla Trencin	Slovak	52	22	10	32	4	—	—	—	—	—
2004–05	HK Dukla Trencin	Slovak	53	14	9	23	18	11	0	2	2	0
2004–05	SHK 37 Piestany	Slovak	3	0	1	1	4	—	—	—	—	—
2005–06	HK Dukla Trencin	Slovak	54	12	13	25	18	4	0	0	0	10
2006–07	HK Dukla Trencin	Slovak	54	29	31	60	77	14	9	4	13	2
2007–08	HC Sparta Praha	Czech	52	11	3	14	14	4	1	1	2	0
2008–09	HC Ocelari Trinec	Czech	12	3	2	5	4	—	—	—	—	—
2008–09	HC Sparta Praha	Czech	10	0	1	1	4	—	—	—	—	—
2008–09	HC Ceske Budejovice	Czech	23	2	9	11	4	—	—	—	—	—
2009–10	HC Ceske Budejovice	Czech	49	5	4	9	10	5	3	1	4	0
2010–11	HK Dukla Trencin	Slovak	56	16	21	37	28	9	2	3	5	0
2011–12	HK Dukla Trencin	Slovak	48	5	18	23	28	10	4	1	5	4
2012–13	SHK 37 Piestany	Slovak	56	17	7	24	36	14	4	5	9	12
2013–14	SHK 37 Piestany	Slovak	55	12	20	32	36	11	3	2	5	8
2014–15	HK Dukla Trencin	Slovak	56	19	20	39	30	5	1	0	1	2
2015–16	HK Dukla Trencin	Slovak	55	19	8	27	14	5	0	0	0	0
2016–17	MHK Dubnica	Slovak3	8	4	10	14	4	—	—	—	—	—
Slovak totals			694	198	184	382	319	83	23	17	40	38
