= Marek Bartánus =

Slovak ice hockey player

- Born: 13 February 1987 (age 39) Liptovský Mikuláš, Czechoslovakia
- Height: 6 ft 3 in (191 cm)
- Weight: 218 lb (99 kg; 15 st 8 lb)
- Position: Right wing
- Shoots: Right
- Slovak team Former teams: HC Košice: HK Trebišov; Owen Sound Attack; HK Poprad; MHk 32 Liptovský Mikuláš; HC Sparta Praha; HC Berounští Medvědi; HC Karlovy Vary; HC Slovan Bratislava; HK 36 Skalica; HC Vítkovice; ŠHK 37 Piešťany; HC Ajoie; HC '05 Banská Bystrica; HK Dukla Michalovce
- National team: Slovakia
- NHL draft: 92nd overall, 2005; Tampa Bay Lightning
- Playing career: 2004–present

Marek Bartánus (born 13 February 1987) is a Slovak ice hockey player who is currently playing for the HC Košice of the Slovak Extraliga. He was selected by the Tampa Bay Lightning in the 4th round (92nd overall) of the 2005 NHL entry draft.

== Early life ==
Bartánus was born on 13 February 1987 in Liptovský Mikuláš. His father was a youth ice hockey coach and his two sisters were basketball players.

== Career ==
Bartánus played with HC Sparta Praha in the Czech Extraliga during the 2010–11 Czech Extraliga season. He previously played for Owen Sound Attack, HC Košice, HK Poprad, and MHK 32 Liptovský Mikuláš.

Bartánus was a part of the Slovak ice hockey squad that finished ninth place at the 2016 IIHF World Championship.

In 2001, Bartánus returned to HC Košice, the team he played for in the early years of his career. In 2025, despite struggling with injuries, Bartánus won his seventh Slovak Extraliga championship—more than any other player in league history.

== Personal life ==
Bartánus is married and has two children.

== Career statistics ==
=== Regular season and playoffs ===
			Regular season					Playoffs
Season	Team	League	GP	G	A	Pts	PIM	GP	G	A	Pts	PIM
2002–03	HC Košice	SVK U18	32	4	4	8	38	—	—	—	—	—
2003–04	HC Košice	SVK U18	4	3	2	5	2	—	—	—	—	—
2003–04	HC Košice	SVK U20	41	23	11	34	40	3	1	2	3	8
2004–05	HC Košice	SVK U20	34	14	14	28	99	8	1	1	2	16
2004–05	HC Košice	SVK	24	2	1	3	2	—	—	—	—	—
2004–05	HK VTJ Trebišov	SVK.2	1	0	0	0	0	—	—	—	—	—
2005–06	Owen Sound Attack	OHL	49	7	12	19	47	10	2	4	6	8
2006–07	Owen Sound Attack	OHL	57	6	14	20	56	4	0	1	1	0
2007–08	HC Košice	SVK	48	3	6	9	47	16	2	0	2	10
2007–08	HK VTJ Trebišov	SVK.2	7	7	6	13	27	—	—	—	—	—
2008–09	HC Košice	SVK	3	0	0	0	0	—	—	—	—	—
2008–09	HK Trebišov	SVK.2	1	0	1	1	2	—	—	—	—	—
2008–09	HK Aquacity ŠKP Poprad	SVK	52	9	8	17	12	—	—	—	—	—
2009–10	MHk 32 Liptovský Mikuláš	SVK	47	28	21	49	30	—	—	—	—	—
2010–11	HC Sparta Praha	ELH	50	9	8	17	30	—	—	—	—	—
2010–11	HC Berounští Medvědi	CZE.2	2	1	0	1	2	—	—	—	—	—
2011–12	HC Energie Karlovy Vary	ELH	7	0	0	0	16	—	—	—	—	—
2011–12	HC Slovan Bratislava	SVK	36	9	18	27	24	16	6	6	12	8
2012–13	HK 36 Skalica	SVK	14	4	10	14	4	—	—	—	—	—
2012–13	HC Vítkovice Steel	ELH	21	4	0	4	8	8	0	2	2	2
2013–14	ŠHK 37 Piešťany	SVK	28	9	10	19	24	—	—	—	—	—
2013–14	HC Ajoie	SUI.2	8	1	5	6	6	—	—	—	—	—
2013–14	HC Košice	SVK	15	9	3	12	12	17	4	8	12	35
2014–15	HC Košice	SVK	48	11	18	29	20	13	4	4	8	6
2015–16	HC Košice	SVK	47	12	19	31	28	8	1	1	2	4
2016–17	HC Košice	SVK	25	10	8	18	8	6	4	0	4	4
2017–18	HC ’05 iClinic Banská Bystrica	SVK	48	15	14	29	24	14	5	2	7	4
2018–19	HC ’05 iClinic Banská Bystrica	SVK	32	9	13	22	8	16	4	7	11	4
2019–20	HC ’05 iClinic Banská Bystrica	SVK	52	8	20	28	24	—	—	—	—	—
2020–21	HK Dukla Ingema Michalovce	SVK	50	13	8	21	22	12	4	2	6	0
2021–22	HC Košice	SVK	46	15	9	24	45	11	1	3	4	2
2022–23	HC Košice	SVK	46	11	12	23	22	17	4	6	10	6
2023–24	HC Košice	SVK	29	4	7	11	12	11	3	5	8	2
2024–25	HC Košice	SVK	16	2	1	3	4	7	4	1	5	6
SVK totals			706	183	206	390	372	156	40	42	82	93
ELH totals			78	13	8	21	54	8	0	2	2	2

=== International ===
Year	Team	Event	Result	GP	G	A	Pts	PIM
2004	Slovakia	U17	7th	5	2	0	2	6
2005	Slovakia	WJC18	6th	6	1	1	2	2
2006	Slovakia	WJC	8th	5	1	0	1	4
2007	Slovakia	WJC	8th	6	1	2	3	8
2016	Slovakia	WC	9th	7	0	1	1	0
Junior totals				22	5	3	8	20
Senior totals				7	0	1	1	0

== Awards and honours ==
Award	Year
Slovak Extraliga
Champion	2012, 2014, 2015, 2018, 2019, 2023 , 2025
