= Adam Lapšanský =

Slovak ice hockey player

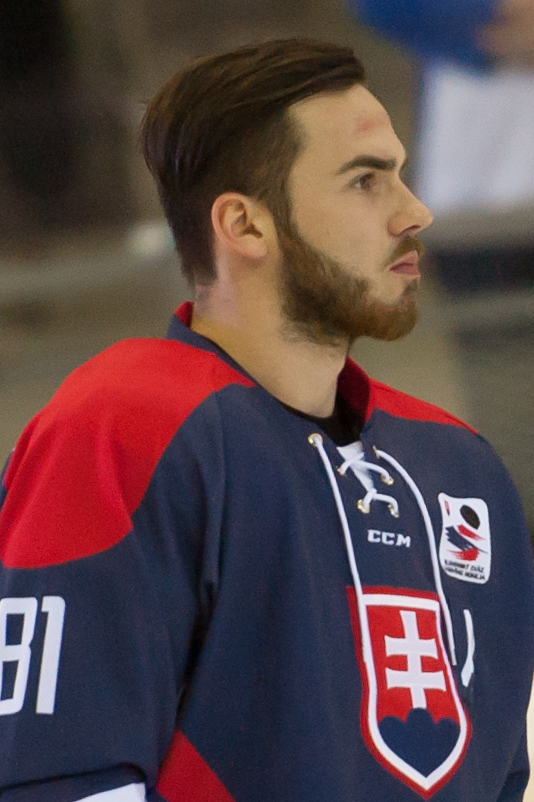
- Born: 10 April 1990 (age 36) Spišská Nová Ves, Czechoslovakia
- Height: 183 cm (6 ft 0 in)
- Weight: 89 kg (196 lb; 14 st 0 lb)
- Position: Left wing
- Shoots: Left
- Slovak team Former teams: HC Dukla Trenčín; HK Poprad; MHK Kežmarok; HC Sparta Praha; Piráti Chomutov; HC Litvínov; HC Stadion Litoměřice; HC Slovan Ústečtí Lvi; HC Košice; Indy Fuel; Ravensburg Towerstars; HC Karlovy Vary; HK Dukla Trenčín; Bratislava Capitals; HK Dukla Michalovce; HC 19 Humenné
- Playing career: 2006–present

Adam Lapšanský (born 10 April 1990) is a Slovak professional ice hockey player who currently playing for HC Dukla Trenčín of the Slovak Extraliga.

== Career statistics ==
=== Regular season and playoffs ===
			Regular season					Playoffs
Season	Team	League	GP	G	A	Pts	PIM	GP	G	A	Pts	PIM
2004–05	HK Poprad	Slovak U18	26	11	8	19	10	1	0	0	0	2
2005–06	HK Poprad	Slovak U18	28	12	7	19	18	2	0	0	0	0
2006–07	HK Poprad	Slovak U18	8	3	1	4	6	—	—	—	—	—
2006–07	HK Poprad	Slovak-Jr.	40	16	7	23	30	—	—	—	—	—
2006–07	HK Poprad	Slovak	1	0	0	0	2	6	0	0	0	0
2007–08	HK Poprad	Slovak-Jr.	11	10	4	14	35	—	—	—	—	—
2007–08	HK Poprad	Slovak	51	5	2	7	26	5	0	0	0	0
2008–09	HK Poprad	Slovak-Jr.	5	6	4	10	2	—	—	—	—	—
2008–09	HK Poprad	Slovak	51	11	6	17	22	—	—	—	—	—
2009–10	HK Poprad	Slovak	39	11	7	18	16	5	0	2	2	0
2009–10	MHK Kežmarok	Slovak.1	3	4	2	6	0	—	—	—	—	—
2010–11	HK Poprad	Slovak	57	21	11	32	28	9	2	3	5	2
2011–12	HC Sparta Praha	Czech	36	6	6	12	24	5	0	0	0	0
2011–12	Piráti Chomutov	Czech.1	9	1	2	3	6	13	2	2	4	8
2012–13	HC Litvínov	Czech	0	0	0	0	0	3	0	0	0	0
2012–13	HC Stadion Litoměřice	Czech.1	24	5	12	17	16	—	—	—	—	—
2012–13	HC Slovan Ústečtí Lvi	Czech.1	19	6	6	12	10	8	3	2	5	2
2013–14	HK Poprad	Slovak	52	28	19	47	20	5	2	1	3	2
2014–15	HC Košice	Slovak	53	23	10	33	40	17	4	1	5	4
2015–16	HC Košice	Slovak	20	6	1	7	31	8	3	2	5	4
2015–16	Indy Fuel	ECHL	25	7	8	15	6	—	—	—	—	—
2016–17	HK Poprad	Slovak	33	12	14	26	12	—	—	—	—	—
2016–17	Ravensburg Towerstars	DEL2	23	9	7	16	6	3	2	2	4	2
2017–18	Ravensburg Towerstars	DEL2	39	18	19	37	14	2	0	1	1	0
2018–19	HC Karlovy Vary	Czech	41	7	5	12	6	—	—	—	—	—
2019–20	HK Dukla Trenčín	Slovak	31	7	8	15	14	—	—	—	—	—
2019–20	HK Poprad	Slovak	17	7	7	14	8	—	—	—	—	—
2020–21	Bratislava Capitals	IceHL	33	6	7	13	4	—	—	—	—	—
2020–21	HC Košice	Slovak	14	5	1	6	4	4	2	0	2	2
2021–22	HC Košice	Slovak	30	2	6	8	40	4	1	2	3	4
2022–23	HK Dukla Michalovce	Slovak	25	5	3	8	12	—	—	—	—	—
2022–23	HC Nové Zámky	Slovak	8	1	1	2	2	5	0	0	0	4
Czech totals			77	13	11	24	30	8	0	0	0	0
Slovak totals			482	144	96	240	277	68	14	11	25	22

=== International ===
Year	Team	Event	Result	GP	G	A	Pts	PIM
2007	Slovakia	WJC18	5th	5	0	1	1	2
2008	Slovakia	WJC18	7th	6	2	1	3	6
2010	Slovakia	WJC	8th	6	0	0	0	2
Junior totals				17	2	2	4	10

== Awards and honours ==
Award	Year
Slovak Extraliga
Champion	2015
