= 2015 Deutschland Cup =

Tournament details
- Host country: Germany
- Venue: 1 (in 1 host city)
- Dates: 6–8 November
- Teams: 4

Final positions
- Champions: Germany (7th title)
- Runners-up: United States
- Third place: Switzerland
- Fourth place: Slovakia

Tournament statistics
- Games played: 6
- Goals scored: 32 (5.33 per game)
- Attendance: 27,242 (4,540 per game)
- Scoring leader: (Germany) Philip Gogulla (5 points)

Official website
- Website

The 2015 Deutschland Cup was the 26th edition of the tournament.

== Teams ==
- Germany
- Slovakia
- Switzerland
- United States

== Standings ==
Pos	Team	Pld	W	OTW	OTL	L	GF	GA	GD	Pts
1	Germany	3	2	0	0	1	11	7	+4	6
2	United States	3	1	1	0	1	8	9	−1	5
3	Switzerland	3	1	0	1	1	7	11	−4	4
4	Slovakia	3	1	0	0	2	6	5	+1	3

Source: IIHF
Rules for classification: 1) points; 2) head-to-head points; 3) head-to-head goal difference; 4) head-to-head number of goals scored.

== Results ==
All times are local (UTC+1).

6 November 2015; 16:00	United States	1–0 (0–0, 1–0, 0–0)	Slovakia	Curt Frenzel Stadium, Augsburg; Attendance: 4,258

Game reference
Ryan Zapolski	Goalies	Samuel Baroš	Referees: (Germany) Marc Iwert (Germany) Marian Rohatsch; Linesmen: (Germany) Thorsten Lajoie (Germany) Jonas Merten
Hanowski (Little) – 23:31 / 1–0			Referees: (Germany) Marc Iwert (Germany) Marian Rohatsch; Linesmen: (Germany) Thorsten Lajoie (Germany) Jonas Merten
6 min	Penalties	14 min	Referees: (Germany) Marc Iwert (Germany) Marian Rohatsch; Linesmen: (Germany) Thorsten Lajoie (Germany) Jonas Merten
25	Shots	33	Referees: (Germany) Marc Iwert (Germany) Marian Rohatsch; Linesmen: (Germany) Thorsten Lajoie (Germany) Jonas Merten

6 November 2015; 19:30	Germany	2–3 (1–0, 0–2, 1–1)	Switzerland	Curt Frenzel Stadium, Augsburg; Attendance: 4,258

Game reference

Dennis Endras
Goalies
Benjamin Conz
Referees:
(Germany) Stefan Bauer
(Czech Republic) Vladimír Pešina
Linesmen:
(Germany) Markku Büse
(Germany) Nikolas Neutzer

Gogulla (Schütz, Hager) (PP2) – 17:58	1–0
	1–1	24:52 – Moser (Walker)
	1–2	30:00 – Hofmann (Praplan, Martschini) (PP)
Boyle (Ankert, Ehliz) – 48:19	2–2
	2–3	51:50 – Martschini (Frick, Helbling) (PP)

36 min
Penalties
41 min
26
Shots
23

7 November 2015; 14:00	Switzerland	4–5 OT (0–0, 3–1, 1–3) (OT 0–1)	United States	Curt Frenzel Stadium, Augsburg; Attendance: 4,739

Game reference

Sandro Zurkichen
Goalies
Ryan Zapolski
Referees:
(Germany) Stefan Bauer
(Germany) Marc Iwert
Linesmen:
(Germany) Lukas Kohlmüller
(Germany) Jonas Merten

	0–1	24:50 – Slater
Cunti (Loeffel) (PP) – 25:45	1–1
Hofmann (Frick) (PP2) – 33:26	2–1
Martschini (Cunti, Chiesa) – 34:37	3–1
Hofmann (PS) – 42:13	4–1
	4–2	43:49 – Connelly (Broadhurst)
	4–3	52:13 – Hanowski (Gilroy, Butler)
	4–4	52:40 – Wellman (Kessel, Little)
	4–5	62:56 – Billins (Stapleton, Stoa)

8 min
Penalties
35 min
35
Shots
46

7 November 2015; 17:30	Germany	4–2 (2–0, 2–0, 0–2)	Slovakia	Curt Frenzel Stadium, Augsburg; Attendance: 4,739

Game reference

Dennis Endras
Goalies
Samuel Baroš
Michal Dzubina
Referees:
(Germany) Sirko Hunnius
(Czech Republic) Vladimír Pešina
Linesmen:
(Germany) Thorsten Lajoie
(Germany) Nikolas Neutzer

Macek (Gogulla) – 00:53	1–0
Ehliz (Daschner, Macek) (PP) – 14:07	2–0
Kohl (Gogulla, Schütz) (PP) – 24:58	3–0
Gogulla (Schütz, Macek) – 28:11	4–0
	4–1	41:01 – Bakoš (Šťastný, Ďaloga)
	4–2	57:44 – Réway (Bakoš)

10 min
Penalties
14 min
26
Shots
23

8 November 2015; 13:00	Slovakia	4–0 (1–0, 1–0, 2–0)	Switzerland	Curt Frenzel Stadium, Augsburg; Attendance: 4,624

Game reference

Michal Dzubina
Goalies
Benjamin Conz
Referees:
(Germany) Stefan Bauer
(Germany) Sirko Hunnius
Linesmen:
(Germany) Jonas Merten
(Germany) Nikolas Neutzer

Šťastný (Skalický) – 11:04	1–0
Marcinko (Bartánus, Dravecký) (PP) – 25:05	2–0
Dravecký (Bartánus) (PP2) – 42:25	3–0
Šedivý (Kukumberg, Lušňák) – 57:12	4–0

16 min
Penalties
66 min
22
Shots
25

8 November 2015; 16:45	United States	2–5 (0–3, 2–1, 0–1)	Germany	Curt Frenzel Stadium, Augsburg; Attendance: 4,624

Game reference

Calvin Heeter
Ryan Zapolski
Goalies
Felix Brückmann
Referees:
(Czech Republic) Vladimír Pešina
(Germany) Marian Rohatsch
Linesmen:
(Germany) Markku Büse
(Germany) Lukas Kohlmüller

	0–1	05:22 – Kahun (Brückmann) (PP)
	0–2	05:49 – Hager (Schütz) (PP)
	0–3	13:57 – Gogulla (Akdag, Schütz) (PP)
Stapleton (Billins) (PP) – 32:08	1–3
	1–4	33:54 – Wolf (Flaake, Hager)
Stoa (Wellman, Billins) (PP) – 38:32	2–4
	2–5	59:11 – Wolf (Hospelt) (ENG)

8 min
Penalties
12 min
35
Shots
35
