= Radoslav Kropáč =

Slovak ice hockey player

- Born: April 5, 1975 (age 51) Bratislava, Czechoslovakia
- Height: 6 ft 1 in (185 cm)
- Weight: 194 lb (88 kg; 13 st 12 lb)
- Position: Right wing
- Shot: Right
- Played for: HC Slovan Bratislava; JYP; Salavat Yulaev Ufa; HC Havířov Panthers; HC Bílí Tygři Liberec; HC Pardubice; HC Slavia Praha; HC Oceláři Třinec; HC České Budějovice; HC Vítkovice; MHk 32 Liptovský Mikuláš; MsHK Žilina; HK Nitra; GKS Tychy; HK 36 Skalica; HC Nové Zámky
- National team: Slovakia
- NHL draft: 260th overall, 1994; New York Rangers
- Playing career: 1993–2016

Radoslav Kropáč (born 4 April 1975) is a Slovak former professional ice hockey player.

Kropáč was drafted 260th overall by the New York Rangers in the 1994 NHL entry draft but never played in North America. He played in the Slovak Extraliga with HC Slovan Bratislava, MHk 32 Liptovský Mikuláš, MsHK Žilina, HK Nitra and HK 36 Skalica and the Czech Extraliga for HC Havířov Panthers, HC Bílí Tygři Liberec, HC Pardubice, HC Slavia Praha, HC Oceláři Třinec, HC České Budějovice and HC Vítkovice. He also played one season in the SM-liiga in Finland for JYP as well as a brief spell in the Russian Superleague for Salavat Yulaev Ufa.

Kropáč was a member of the Slovakia national team for the 1998 IIHF World Championship.

== Career statistics ==
			Regular season					Playoffs
Season	Team	League	GP	G	A	Pts	PIM	GP	G	A	Pts	PIM
1993–94	HC Slovan Bratislava	Slovak	33	7	6	13	12	8	4	2	6	4
1994–95	HC Slovan Bratislava	Slovak	35	17	8	25	38	7	1	2	3	4
1995–96	HC Slovan Bratislava	Slovak	44	9	12	21	33	—	—	—	—	—
1996–97	HC Slovan Bratislava	Slovak	45	9	8	17	22	—	—	—	—	—
1996–97	ŠHK Danubia 96 Bratislava	Slovak2	3	2	3	5	2	—	—	—	—	—
1997–98	HC Slovan Bratislava	Slovak	44	15	15	30	12	—	—	—	—	—
1998–99	HC Slovan Bratislava	Slovak	50	30	23	53	30	—	—	—	—	—
1999–00	HC Slovan Bratislava	Slovak	30	5	9	14	4	1	0	0	0	0
1999–00	HC Slovan Bratislava B	Slovak2	15	12	11	23	6	—	—	—	—	—
2000–01	JYP Jyväskylä	Liiga	54	13	8	21	32	—	—	—	—	—
2001–02	Salavat Yulaev Ufa	Russia	8	1	1	2	0	—	—	—	—	—
2001–02	HC Slovan Bratislava	Slovak	5	1	0	1	0	—	—	—	—	—
2001–02	HC Havirov Panthers	Czech	25	15	8	23	34	—	—	—	—	—
2002–03	Bili Tygri Liberec	Czech	45	22	20	42	80	—	—	—	—	—
2002–03	HC ČSOB Pojišťovna Pardubice	Czech	7	4	1	5	4	18	3	8	11	14
2003–04	Bili Tygri Liberec	Czech	13	3	4	7	8	—	—	—	—	—
2003–04	HC Slavia Praha	Czech	27	7	6	13	8	—	—	—	—	—
2003–04	HC Ocelari Trinec	Czech	10	2	1	3	2	6	0	0	0	2
2004–05	HC Ceske Budejovice	Czech2	51	18	27	45	36	8	2	1	3	16
2005–06	HC Vitkovice Steel	Czech	45	10	14	24	16	6	0	0	0	2
2006–07	HC Vitkovice Steel	Czech	49	10	8	18	22	—	—	—	—	—
2007–08	HC Slovan Bratislava	Slovak	48	10	26	36	50	17	3	8	11	94
2008–09	HC Slovan Bratislava	Slovak	55	17	29	46	76	12	4	5	9	62
2009–10	HK 32 Liptovsky Mikulas	Slovak	30	6	7	13	26	—	—	—	—	—
2009–10	MsHK Zilina	Slovak	14	5	5	10	6	—	—	—	—	—
2010–11	SV Silz	Austria4	7	10	1	11	16	—	—	—	—	—
2010–11	HK Spisska Nova Ves	Slovak2	7	1	6	7	2	4	0	0	0	0
2011–12	HK Spisska Nova Ves	Slovak2	32	21	18	39	20	—	—	—	—	—
2012–13	GKS Tychy	Poland	6	0	0	0	0	—	—	—	—	—
2013–14	MsHK Zilina	Slovak	12	0	3	3	0	—	—	—	—	—
2013–14	HK 36 Skalica	Slovak	53	10	18	28	18	6	2	2	4	0
2014–15	HC Nove Zamky	Erste Liga	1	0	1	1	0	—	—	—	—	—
2014–15	MsHK Zilina	Slovak	5	0	2	2	4	—	—	—	—	—
2014–15	HC Nove Zamky	Slovak3	3	2	2	4	0	—	—	—	—	—
2015–16	Bratislava Capitals	Slovak3	1	1	0	1	0	—	—	—	—	—
Slovak totals			517	145	178	323	356	56	16	23	39	170
Czech totals			221	73	62	135	174	30	3	8	11	18
