= 2011–12 Slovak Extraliga season =

- League: Slovak Extraliga
- Sport: Ice hockey
- Duration: 14 September 2011 – 21 April 2012

Regular season
- League Champion: HC Košice
- Top scorer: Žigmund Pálffy (HK 36 Skalica)

Playoffs

Finals
- Champions: HC Slovan Bratislava
- Runners-up: HC Košice

Slovak Extraliga seasons
- 2010–11 2012–13

The 2011–12 Slovak Extraliga season was the 19th season of the Slovak Extraliga since its creation after the breakup of Czechoslovakia and the Czechoslovak First Ice Hockey League in 1993.

== Regular season ==
=== Standings ===
Po.	Club	GP	W	OTW/SOW	OTL/SOL	L	GF	GA	PTS
1.	HC Košice	55	35	2	1	17	191	130	110
2.	HK 36 Skalica	55	33	1	3	18	205	154	104
3.	HC Slovan Bratislava	55	31	1	7	16	176	138	102
4.	HK Poprad	55	29	4	6	16	187	146	101
5.	HK Dukla Trenčín	55	22	5	3	25	147	149	79
6.	MsHK Žilina	55	20	6	5	24	138	164	77
7.	HKm Zvolen	55	21	4	4	26	135	174	75
8.	HC ’05 Banská Bystrica	55	16	9	9	21	136	138	75
9.	MHC Mountfield	55	15	7	4	29	143	186	63
10.	HK Nitra	55	13	5	3	34	141	194	52
11.	HK Orange 20	10	0	1	0	9	15	41	2

clinched playoff spot

Key - GP: Games played, W: Wins, OTW/SOW: Overtime/Shootout wins, OTL/SOL: Overtime/Shootout losses, L: Losses, GF: Goals for, GA: Goals against, PTS: Points.

=== Statistics ===
==== Scoring leaders ====
GP = Games played; G = Goals; A = Assists; Pts = Points; +/– = Plus/minus; PIM = Penalty minutes

Player	Team	GP	G	A	Pts	+/–	PIM
(Slovakia) Žigmund Pálffy	HK 36 Skalica	48	26	57	83	+61	76
(Slovakia) René Školiak	HK 36 Skalica	54	20	42	62	+38	114
(Slovakia) Martin Kuľha	HK Poprad	53	31	21	52	+39	70
(Czech Republic) Jan Hruška	HK 36 Skalica	55	25	27	52	+36	28
(Slovakia) Miroslav Šatan	HC Slovan Bratislava	49	23	29	52	+35	127
(Slovakia) Peter Sivák	MsHK Žilina	55	21	30	51	+18	70
(Slovakia) Ľubomír Vaic	HK Poprad	54	18	33	51	+22	59
(Czech Republic) Petr Obdržálek	HK 36 Skalica	52	16	34	50	+36	12
(Slovakia) Richard Rapáč	HK Poprad	45	20	27	47	+30	82
(Slovakia) Miroslav Zálešák	HC Košice	54	15	32	47	+29	36

==== Leading goaltenders ====
These are the leaders in GAA among goaltenders that have played at least 1200 minutes.

GP = Games played; TOI = Time on ice (minutes); GA = Goals against; Sv% = Save percentage; GAA = Goals against average

Player	Team	GP	TOI	GA	Sv%	GAA
(Czech Republic) Alexandr Hylák	HC Košice	52	3074:35	118	.934	2.30
(Slovakia) Branislav Konrád	HC Slovan Bratislava	45	2570:41	99	.929	2.31
(Russia) Sergei Khoroshun	HC ’05 Banská Bystrica	34	1960:13	77	.925	2.36
(Slovakia) Matúš Kostúr	HC ’05 Banská Bystrica	23	1397:26	55	.931	2.36
(Slovakia) Marcel Melicherčík	HK Poprad	48	2819:47	113	.925	2.40

== Playoffs ==
=== Playoff bracket ===
Quarterfinals
1	Košice	4
8	Banská Bystrica	1
2	Skalica	2
7	Zvolen	4
3	Slovan Bratislava	4
6	Žilina	1
4	Poprad	2
5	Trenčín	4

Semifinals
1	Košice	4
7	Zvolen	0
3	Slovan Bratislava	4
5	Trenčín	0

Finals
1	Košice	3
3	Slovan Bratislava	4

=== Quarterfinals (best-of-seven) ===
- Košice – Banská Bystrica 4–1 (4–3OT, 4–3, 0–1, 3–1, 2–1OT)
- Skalica – Zvolen 2–4 (3–4, 3–0, 2–4, 2–4, 3–1, 1–5)
- Slovan – Žilina 4–1 (3–2, 4–2, 1–3, 5–2, 8–2)
- Poprad – Trenčín 2–4 (5–1, 4–5PS, 1–4, 0–3, 2–1, 1–6)

=== Semifinals (best-of-seven) ===
- Košice – Zvolen 4–0 (7–4, 6–2, 6–1, 5–3)
- Slovan – Trenčín 4–0 (5–4OT, 6–4, 6–2, 4–3)

=== Finals (best-of-seven) ===
- Košice – Slovan 3–4 (2–5, 4–2, 3–1, 1–2, 2–1OT, 3–6, 1–2OT)

=== Playoff statistics ===
==== Playoff scoring leaders ====
Player	Team	GP	G	A	Pts	PIM
(Slovakia) Miroslav Šatan	HC Slovan Bratislava	12	8	14	22	10
(Slovakia) Ján Lipiansky	HC Slovan Bratislava	16	3	17	20	10
(Slovakia) Libor Hudáček	HC Slovan Bratislava	16	9	6	15	32
(Slovakia) Peter Bartoš	HC Košice	16	3	11	14	4
(Slovakia) Vladimír Dravecký	HC Košice	16	11	2	13	14
(Slovakia) Miroslav Zálešák	HC Košice	16	7	5	12	18
(Slovakia) Marek Bartánus	HC Slovan Bratislava	16	6	6	12	8
(Slovakia) Roman Kukumberg	HC Slovan Bratislava	16	3	9	12	12
(Slovakia) Michel Miklík	HC Košice	16	6	5	11	6
(Czech Republic) Kamil Brabenec	HKm Zvolen	10	5	6	11	18

== Final rankings ==
Gold medal	Slovan Bratislava
Silver medal	Košice
Bronze medal	Trenčín
4	Zvolen
5	Skalica
6	Poprad
7	Žilina
8	Banská Bystrica
9	Martin
10	Nitra
