= Hylak =

Hylak may refer to:

- 27433 Hylak, a minor planet
- Alexandr Hylák (born 1983), Czech ice hockey goaltender
