= Oliver Jokeľ =

Slovak ice hockey winger

- Born: 7 August 1991 (age 34) Košice, Czechoslovakia
- Height: 5 ft 11 in (180 cm)
- Weight: 185 lb (84 kg; 13 st 3 lb)
- Position: Winger
- Shoots: Left
- Slovak team Former teams: HC Košice; HK Orange 20; HC 46 Bardejov; MHC Martin; HC Prešov; HK Dukla Michalovce; MHK Humenné
- Playing career: 2010–present

Oliver Jokeľ (born 7 August 1991) is a Slovak professional ice hockey winger currently playing for HC Košice of the Slovak Extraliga.

== Career ==
Jokeľ began his career with HC Košice's U18 and U20 teams before moving to North America where he was drafted 36th overall by the Swift Current Broncos of the Western Hockey League in the 2008 CHL Import Draft. He would play just fourteen games for the Broncos without scoring a single point during the 2008–09 season before returning to Košice.

Jokeľ made his professional debut with Košice during the 2010–11 season where he played eight games and notched up one assist. He then divided his time between Košice and loan spells with HC 46 Bardejov between 2011 and 2014 before leaving his hometown team to join MHC Martin in 2014.

After spending four years in the Slovak 1. Liga for HC Prešov, HC 46 Bardejov and HK Dukla Michalovce, Jokeľ returned to HC Košice on May 8, 2018. Though he would spend most of the season with MHK Humenné of the 1. Liga, he did play fifteen games for Košice during the 2018–19 season and scored three goals. On May 13, 2019, Jokeľ re-signed for Košice on a one-year contract.

== Awards and honors ==
Award	Year
Slovak
Champion	2011, 2014, 2023
