= 2017–18 Slovak Extraliga season =

- League: Slovak Extraliga
- Sport: Ice hockey
- Duration: September 2017 – April 2018

Regular season
- League Champion: HK Nitra
- Runners-up: HKm Zvolen
- Top scorer: Tim Coffman (Zvolen); Matej Paulovič (Nitra)

Playoffs
- Playoffs MVP: Branko Radivojevič (Trenčín)
- Finals champions: HC ’05 Banská Bystrica
- Runners-up: HK Dukla Trenčín

Slovak Extraliga seasons
- 2016–17 2018–19

The 2017–18 Slovak Extraliga season was the 25th season of the Slovak Extraliga, the highest level of ice hockey in Slovakia.

== Teams ==
The following teams are participating in the 2017–18 season. HK Orange 20 is a project to prepare the Slovakia junior ice hockey team for the IIHF World U20 Championship. The team does not play a complete regular season and cannot advance to the playoffs or get relegated. The first eight teams in standings after the regular season (56 games) will advance to the playoffs.

Location of teams in 2017–2018 Slovak Extraliga

| Team name | City | Arena | Capacity |
|---|---|---|---|
| HKm Zvolen | Zvolen | Zvolen Ice Stadium | 7,038 |
| HC Košice | Košice | Steel Aréna | 8,378 |
| HK Nitra | Nitra | Nitra Aréna | 3,600 |
| HC ’05 Banská Bystrica | Banská Bystrica | Banská Bystrica Ice Stadium | 3,518 |
| HC Nové Zámky | Nové Zámky | Zimný štadión Nové Zámky | 3,500 |
| HK Dukla Trenčín | Trenčín | Pavol Demitra Ice Stadium | 6,150 |
| HK Poprad | Poprad | Poprad Ice Stadium | 4,050 |
| MsHK Žilina | Žilina | Garmin Arena | 6,200 |
| MHk 32 Liptovský Mikuláš | Liptovský Mikuláš | Zimný štadión Liptovský Mikuláš | 3,680 |
| HC 07 Detva | Detva | Zimný štadión Detva | 1,800 |
| HK Orange 20 | Piešťany | EASTON Aréna | 3,050 |

== Regular season ==
| Pos | Team | Pld | W | OTW | OTL | L | GF | GA | GD | Pts | Final Result |
|---|---|---|---|---|---|---|---|---|---|---|---|
| 1 | Nitra | 56 | 32 | 6 | 4 | 14 | 197 | 148 | +49 | 112 | Advance to Quarterfinals |
| 2 | Zvolen | 56 | 30 | 7 | 6 | 13 | 192 | 150 | +42 | 110 | Advance to Quarterfinals |
| 3 | Trenčín | 56 | 32 | 5 | 3 | 16 | 157 | 112 | +45 | 109 | Advance to Quarterfinals |
| 4 | Banská Bystrica | 56 | 31 | 5 | 5 | 15 | 213 | 134 | +79 | 108 | Advance to Quarterfinals |
| 5 | Košice | 56 | 28 | 5 | 4 | 19 | 175 | 143 | +32 | 98 | Advance to Quarterfinals |
| 6 | Poprad | 56 | 25 | 6 | 4 | 21 | 159 | 152 | +7 | 91 | Advance to Quarterfinals |
| 7 | Žilina | 56 | 19 | 4 | 6 | 27 | 146 | 164 | −18 | 71 | Advance to Quarterfinals |
| 8 | Nové Zámky | 56 | 14 | 7 | 4 | 31 | 125 | 185 | −60 | 60 | Advance to Quarterfinals |
| 9 | Liptovský Mikuláš | 56 | 12 | 5 | 11 | 28 | 122 | 162 | −40 | 57 | Relegation series |
| 10 | Detva | 56 | 11 | 2 | 3 | 40 | 120 | 207 | −87 | 40 | Relegation series |
| | HK Orange 20 | 20 | 3 | 1 | 3 | 13 | 38 | 87 | −49 | 14 | |

Source: Tipsport Liga

Rules for classification: 1) Points; 2) Head-to-head points.

== Relegation series (PlayOut) ==
| Pos | Team | Pld | W | OTW | OTL | L | GF | GA | GD | Pts | Final Result |
|---|---|---|---|---|---|---|---|---|---|---|---|
| 1 | Liptovský Mikuláš | 12 | 9 | 0 | 1 | 2 | 53 | 26 | +27 | 28 | Will play in 2018–19 Slovak Extraliga season |
| 2 | Detva | 12 | 6 | 1 | 0 | 5 | 44 | 33 | +11 | 20 | Will play in 2018–19 Slovak Extraliga season |
| 3 | Michalovce | 12 | 3 | 2 | 1 | 6 | 30 | 47 | −17 | 14 | Will play in 2018–19 Slovak 1. Liga season |
| 4 | Skalica | 12 | 3 | 0 | 1 | 8 | 26 | 47 | −21 | 10 | Will play in 2018–19 Slovak 1. Liga season |

Source: Tipsport Liga

Rules for classification: 1) Points; 2) Head-to-head points.

== Playoffs ==
=== Bracket ===
Quarterfinals
2 | Zvolen | 4
7 | Žilina | 2
3 | Trenčín | 4
6 | Poprad | 0
1 | Nitra | 4
8 | Nové Zámky | 0
5 | Košice | 1
4 | Banská Bystrica | 4

Semifinals
2 | Zvolen | 2
3 | Trenčín | 4
1 | Nitra | 0
4 | Banská Bystrica | 4

Finals
3 | Trenčín | 3
4 | Banská Bystrica | 4

=== Quarterfinals ===
Nitra – Nové Zámky 4–0
| 15.3.2018 | Nitra | Nové Zámky | 8-1 |
| 16.3.2018 | Nitra | Nové Zámky | 4-1 |
| 19.3.2018 | Nové Zámky | Nitra | 4-5 OT1 |
| 20.3.2018 | Nové Zámky | Nitra | 1-3 |
Nitra wins the series 4–0.

Trenčín – Poprad 4–0
| 17.3.2018 | Trenčín | Poprad | 1-0 |
| 18.3.2018 | Trenčín | Poprad | 3-1 |
| 21.3.2018 | Poprad | Trenčín | 3-5 |
| 22.3.2018 | Poprad | Trenčín | 2-3 |
Trenčín wins the series 4–0.

Zvolen – Žilina 4–2
| 15.3.2018 | Zvolen | Žilina | 1-2 |
| 16.3.2018 | Zvolen | Žilina | 4-1 |
| 19.3.2018 | Žilina | Zvolen | 4-1 |
| 20.3.2018 | Žilina | Zvolen | 2-6 |
| 23.3.2018 | Zvolen | Žilina | 4-1 |
| 25.3.2018 | Žilina | Zvolen | 1-2 |
Zvolen wins the series 4–2.

Banská Bystrica – Košice 4–1
| 17.3.2018 | Banská Bystrica | Košice | 3-2 SO |
| 18.3.2018 | Banská Bystrica | Košice | 2-1 |
| 21.3.2018 | Košice | Banská Bystrica | 3-2 OT1 |
| 22.3.2018 | Košice | Banská Bystrica | 0-3 |
| 24.3.2018 | Banská Bystrica | Košice | 1-0 OT1 |
Banská Bystrica wins the series 4–1.

=== Semifinals ===
Nitra – Banská Bystrica 0–4
| 29.3.2018 | Nitra | Banská Bystrica | 1-2 |
| 30.3.2018 | Nitra | Banská Bystrica | 2-4 |
| 2.4.2018 | Banská Bystrica | Nitra | 6-3 |
| 3.4.2018 | Banská Bystrica | Nitra | 5-2 |
Banská Bystrica wins the series 4–0.

Zvolen – Trenčín 2–4
| 31.3.2018 | Zvolen | Trenčín | 5-2 |
| 1.4.2018 | Zvolen | Trenčín | 3-4 SO |
| 4.4.2018 | Trenčín | Zvolen | 3-1 |
| 5.4.2018 | Trenčín | Zvolen | 3-4 SO |
| 7.4.2018 | Zvolen | Trenčín | 2-3 |
| 9.4.2018 | Trenčín | Zvolen | 3-2 |
Trenčín wins the series 4–2.

=== Finals ===
| 13 April 2018; 18:00 | Trenčín | 3–4 OT1 (1–1, 0–1, 2–1) (OT: 0–1) score in the series: 0–1 | Banská Bystrica | Pavol Demitra Ice Stadium, Trenčín; Attendance: 6,150 |

Game reference
| 65 min | Penalties | 14 min |
| 31 | Shots | 46 |

| 14 April 2018; 18:00 | Trenčín | 3–4 GWS (1–1, 1–0, 1–2) (OT: 0–0) (SO: 0–1) score in the series: 0–2 | Banská Bystrica | Pavol Demitra Ice Stadium, Trenčín; Attendance: 6,150 |

Game reference
| 8 min | Penalties | 8 min |
| 38 | Shots | 34 |

| 17 April 2018; 18:00 | Banská Bystrica | 6–1 (0–1, 2–0, 4–0) score in the series: 3–0 | Trenčín | Banská Bystrica Ice Stadium, Banská Bystrica; Attendance: 2,841 |

Game reference
| 12 min | Penalties | 45 min |
| 34 | Shots | 21 |

| 18 April 2018; 18:00 | Banská Bystrica | 2–4 (0–3, 0–0, 2–1) score in the series: 3–1 | Trenčín | Banská Bystrica Ice Stadium, Banská Bystrica; Attendance: 2,841 |

Game reference
| 8 min | Penalties | 14 min |
| 37 | Shots | 22 |

| 20 April 2018; 18:00 | Trenčín | 6–0 (3–0, 1–0, 2–0) score in the series: 2–3 | Banská Bystrica | Pavol Demitra Ice Stadium, Trenčín; Attendance: 6,150 |

Game reference
| 46 min | Penalties | 73 min |
| 28 | Shots | 29 |

| 22 April 2018; 18:00 | Banská Bystrica | 2–3 (0–1, 1–2, 1–0) score in the series: 3–3 | Trenčín | Banská Bystrica Ice Stadium, Banská Bystrica; Attendance: 2,841 |

Game reference
| 29 min | Penalties | 12 min |
| 39 | Shots | 19 |

| 24 April 2018; 18:00 | Trenčín | 1–5 (0–0, 1–2, 0–3) score in the series: 3–4 | Banská Bystrica | Pavol Demitra Ice Stadium, Trenčín; Attendance: 6,150 |

Game reference
| 2 min | Penalties | 8 min |
| 17 | Shots | 22 |

Banská Bystrica wins the series 4-3 and wins the championship.

== Final rankings ==
| Gold medal | Banská Bystrica |
| Silver medal | Trenčín |
| Bronze medal | Nitra |
| 4 | Zvolen |
| 5 | Košice |
| 6 | Poprad |
| 7 | Žilina |
| 8 | Nové Zámky |
| 9 | Liptovský Mikuláš |
| 10 | Detva |
