= Tomáš Zigo =

Slovak ice hockey player

- Born: 11 April 1992 (age 33) Banská Bystrica, Czechoslovakia
- Height: 6 ft 1 in (185 cm)
- Weight: 187 lb (85 kg; 13 st 5 lb)
- Position: Forward
- Shoots: Left
- Slovak team Former teams: HC Košice; HC '05 Banská Bystrica; HK Orange 20; HK Brezno; HC 07 Detva; HC Slovan Bratislava; Mountfield HK; HC Slavia Praha
- National team: Slovakia
- Playing career: 2010–present

Tomáš Zigo (born 11 April 1992) is a Slovak professional ice hockey player who currently playing for HC Košice of the Slovak Extraliga.

== International play ==
He participated at the 2017 IIHF World Championship.

== Career statistics ==
=== Regular season and playoffs ===
			Regular season					Playoffs
Season	Team	League	GP	G	A	Pts	PIM	GP	G	A	Pts	PIM

=== International ===
Year	Team	Event	Result	GP	G	A	Pts	PIM
2017	Slovakia	WC	14th	6	0	2	2	4
2019	Slovakia	WC	9th	7	0	0	0	0
Senior totals				13	0	2	2	4

== Awards and honors ==
Award	Year
Slovak
Champion	2017, 2019, 2022
