= Rastislav Staňa =

Slovak ice hockey player

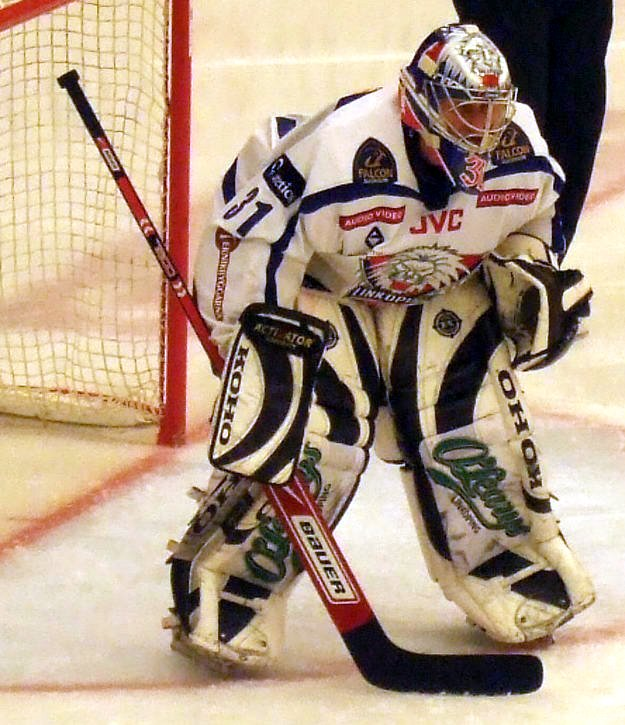
- Stana in 2007
- Born: 10 January 1980 (age 46) Košice, Czechoslovakia
- Height: 6 ft 1 in (185 cm)
- Weight: 194 lb (88 kg; 13 st 12 lb)
- Position: Goaltender
- Caught: Left
- Played for: Sparta Praha; HC Košice HC CSKA Moscow; Severstal Cherepovets; Linköpings HC; Malmö Redhawks; Södertälje SK; Washington Capitals
- National team: Slovakia
- NHL draft: 193rd overall, 1998; Washington Capitals
- Playing career: 2000–2015

Rastislav Staňa (born 10 January 1980) is a Slovak former professional ice hockey goaltender. He played 6 games in the National Hockey League (NHL) with the Washington Capitals during the 2003–04 season. The rest of his career, which lasted from 2000 to 2015, was mainly spent in Europe. Internationally Stana played for the Slovak national team at 6 Ice Hockey World Championships, winning the gold medal in 2002, and the 2002 Winter Olympics.

== Biography ==
Staňa was born in Košice, Czechoslovakia. As a youth, he played in the 1994 Quebec International Pee-Wee Hockey Tournament with a team from Bratislava.

Staňa was drafted by the Washington Capitals in the 1998 NHL entry draft, 193rd overall in the 7th round. After being drafted, he began playing in the Western Hockey League for the Moose Jaw Warriors and was later traded to the Calgary Hitmen. Staňa turned pro in 2000 and signed with the Capitals. He was assigned to play for the Richmond Renegades of the ECHL, but also played a handful of games for the AHL's Portland Pirates. By 2002, Staňa was playing solely for the Pirates and during the 2003–04 NHL season, he played six games for the Washington Capitals.

Staňa moved to Sweden to play in Elitserien for Södertälje SK during the NHL lockout. He would remain in Sweden for another three seasons. After a second season with Södertälje, Staňa moved to the Malmö Redhawks and then Linköpings HC. In 2008, Staňa moved to Russia to play in the newly created Kontinental Hockey League and signed a contract to play for Severstal Cherepovets, later moving to CSKA Moscow for the 2011–12 KHL season.

== Career statistics ==
=== Regular season and playoffs ===
			Regular season										Playoffs
Season	Team	League	GP	W	L	T	OTL	MIN	GA	SO	GAA	SV%	GP	W	L	MIN	GA	SO	GAA	SV%
1995–96	HC Košice U18	SVK U18	—	—	—	—	—	—	—	—	2.11	.908	—	—	—	—	—	—	—	—
1996–97	HC Košice U18	SVK U18	—	—	—	—	—	—	—	—	2.35	.933	—	—	—	—	—	—	—	—
1997–98	HC Košice U20	SVK U20	32	—	—	—	—	1920	56	—	1.75	—	—	—	—	—	—	—	—	—
1998–99	Moose Jaw Warriors	WHL	36	21	14	1	—	2131	123	2	3.46	.897	9	4	5	544	30	0	3.30	.914
1999–00	Moose Jaw Warriors	WHL	14	4	9	0	—	730	48	0	3.94	.899	—	—	—	—	—	—	—	—
1999–00	Calgary Hitmen	WHL	16	13	2	1	—	971	37	1	2.29	.918	9	7	2	526	21	1	2.39	.911
2000–01	Portland Pirates	AHL	3	0	2	1	—	161	11	0	4.09	.883	—	—	—	—	—	—	—	—
2000–01	Richmond Renegades	ECHL	38	15	16	2	—	2111	90	1	2.56	.914	3	1	2	178	7	0	2.34	—
2001–02	Portland Pirates	AHL	3	1	2	0	—	180	11	0	3.66	.893	—	—	—	—	—	—	—	—
2001–02	Richmond Renegades	ECHL	36	20	12	3	—	2098	95	1	2.72	.923	—	—	—	—	—	—	—	—
2002–03	Portland Pirates	AHL	24	8	11	4	—	1355	49	2	2.17	.933	1	0	1	59	3	0	3.08	.917
2003–04	Washington Capitals	NHL	6	1	2	0	—	211	11	0	3.13	.890	—	—	—	—	—	—	—	—
2003–04	Portland Pirates	AHL	24	14	5	4	—	1429	40	5	1.68	.941	3	1	2	139	7	0	3.02	.907
2004–05	Södertälje SK	SWE	45	18	24	2	—	2562	116	3	2.72	.914	10	4	6	605	22	1	2.18	.920
2005–06	Södertälje SK	SWE	43	10	28	—	5	2554	129	3	3.03	.899	—	—	—	—	—	—	—	—
2006–07	Malmö Redhawks	SWE	29	7	17	—	4	1636	81	2	2.97	.907	—	—	—	—	—	—	—	—
2006–07	Linköping HC	SWE	11	6	3	—	2	672	21	3	1.88	.932	15	10	5	936	31	2	2.33	.913
2007–08	Linköping HC	SWE	40	23	10	—	4	2344	108	2	2.76	.901	—	—	—	—	—	—	—	—
2008–09	Severstal Cherepovets	KHL	36	18	10	—	6	1920	79	1	2.47	.901	—	—	—	—	—	—	—	—
2009–10	Severstal Cherepovets	KHL	49	15	20	—	12	2897	125	0	2.59	.906	—	—	—	—	—	—	—	—
2010–11	Severstal Cherepovets	KHL	26	11	11	—	0	1390	52	4	2.24	.917	1	0	0	45	5	0	6.62	.643
2011–12	CSKA Moscow	KHL	46	20	19	—	4	2647	91	2	2.06	.926	5	1	4	202	13	0	3.87	.883
2012–13	CSKA Moscow	KHL	34	18	6	—	2	1955	57	4	1.76	.934	9	5	4	551	16	0	1.74	.939
2013–14	CSKA Moscow	KHL	25	11	11	—	0	1430	55	2	2.31	.912	—	—	—	—	—	—	—	—
2013–14	HC Košice	SVK	8	—	—	—	—	479	10	0	1.25	.952	17	—	—	1010	29	—	1.66	.944
2014–15	Sparta Praha	CZE	13	7	6	—	0	769	33	1	2.57	.903	—	—	—	—	—	—	—	—
NHL totals			6	1	2	0	—	212	11	0	3.12	.890	—	—	—	—	—	—	—	—

=== International ===
Medal record

Representing Slovakia

Ice hockey

World Championships
Gold medal – first place	2002 Sweden	
Bronze medal – third place	2003 Finland	

World Junior Championships
Bronze medal – third place	1999 Canada	

Year	Team	Event	GP	W	L	T	MIN	GA	SO	GAA	SV%
1998	Slovakia	EJC	5	—	—	—	300	18	0	3.60	.872
2000	Slovakia	WJC	4	—	—	—	204	8	0	2.35	.927
2002	Slovakia	OLY	1	1	0	0	60	1	0	1.00	.947
2002	Slovakia	WC	3	3	0	0	180	8	1	2.67	.902
2003	Slovakia	WC	2	2	0	0	120	4	0	2.00	.913
2004	Slovakia	WCH	2	0	1	0	92	6	0	4.08	.860
2005	Slovakia	WC	2	1	1	0	92	6	0	3.90	.829
2009	Slovakia	WC	2	1	1	0	125	4	0	1.92	.888
2010	Slovakia	WC	2	0	0	0	75	4	0	3.21	.902
2013	Slovakia	WC	6	3	3	0	382	16	0	2.51	.905
Senior totals			21	11	6	0	1126	49	1	2.61	—

== Awards and honors ==
Award	Year
Slovak
Champion	2014
