= Tomáš Hrnka =

Slovak ice hockey player

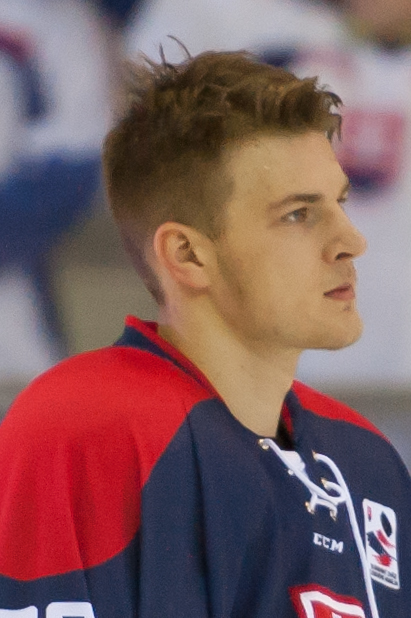
- Born: November 11, 1991 (age 33); Nitra, Czechoslovakia
- Height: 6 ft 5 in (196 cm)
- Weight: 214 lb (97 kg; 15 st 4 lb)
- Position: Forward
- Shoots: Left
- Slovak team Former teams: HK Nitra; HK Orange 20; HC Košice; HC 46 Bardejov; HC Plzeň; HC Slovan Bratislava; HC '05 Banská Bystrica
- National team: Slovakia
- Playing career: 2010–present

Tomáš Hrnka (born November 11, 1991) is a Slovak professional ice hockey player who currently plays with HK Nitra of the Slovak Extraliga. He also represents the Slovak national team.

He participated at the 2017 IIHF World Championship.

== Career statistics ==
=== Regular season and playoffs ===
			Regular season					Playoffs
Season	Team	League	GP	G	A	Pts	PIM	GP	G	A	Pts	PIM
KHL totals			86	10	4	14	47	—	—	—	—	—
Czech totals			46	3	5	8	20	8	0	2	2	8
Slovak totals			315	68	70	138	344	72	10	15	25	65

=== International ===
Year	Team	Event	Result	GP	G	A	Pts	PIM
2016	Slovakia	WC	9th	3	0	1	1	2
2017	Slovakia	WC	14th	6	0	0	0	0
Senior totals				9	0	1	1	2
