= Matej Češík =

Slovak ice hockey player

- Born: 26 June 1988 (age 37) Banská Bystrica, Czechoslovakia
- Height: 6 ft 2 in (188 cm)
- Weight: 201 lb (91 kg; 14 st 5 lb)
- Position: Centre
- Shoots: Left
- Slovak 1. Liga team Former teams: HK Spišská Nová Ves; HC '05 Banská Bystrica; HC Slovan Bratislava; HK Brezno; MHk 32 Liptovský Mikuláš; HC Košice; Orli Znojmo; HK Dukla Michalovce
- Playing career: 2006–present

Matej Češík (born 26 June 1988) is a Slovak professional ice hockey player who plays for HK Spišská Nová Ves of the Slovak 1. Liga. He previously played in the Slovak Extraliga for HC Slovan Bratislava, HC '05 Banská Bystrica and HC Košice.

== Career statistics ==
=== Regular season and playoffs ===
| | | | Regular season | | | | | Playoffs |
| Season | Team | League | GP | G | A | Pts | PIM | GP | G | A | Pts | PIM |

=== International ===
| Year | Team | Event | Result | GP | G | A | Pts | PIM |
|---|---|---|---|---|---|---|---|---|
| 2008 | Slovakia | WJC | 7th | 6 | 1 | 1 | 2 | 8 |
| Junior totals | | | | 6 | 1 | 1 | 2 | 8 |
