= Robert Kristan =

Slovenian professional goaltender (born 1983)

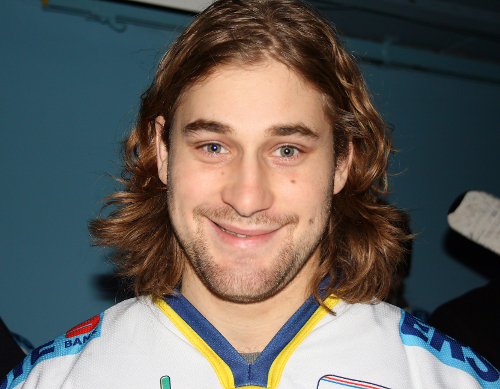
- Born: 4 April 1983 (age 42) Jesenice, Slovenia, SFR Yugoslavia
- Height: 6 ft 0 in (183 cm)
- Weight: 187 lb (85 kg; 13 st 5 lb)
- Position: Goaltender
- Caught: Left
- Played for: HK Acroni Jesenice; HDD Olimpija Ljubljana; Brynäs IF; Mora IK; KHL Medveščak Zagreb; HK Nitra; Piráti Chomutov; HC Pardubice
- National team: Slovenia
- Playing career: 2000–2018

Robert Kristan (born 4 April 1983) is a Slovenian former professional goaltender who last played for HK Olimpija in the Alps Hockey League.

== Playing career ==
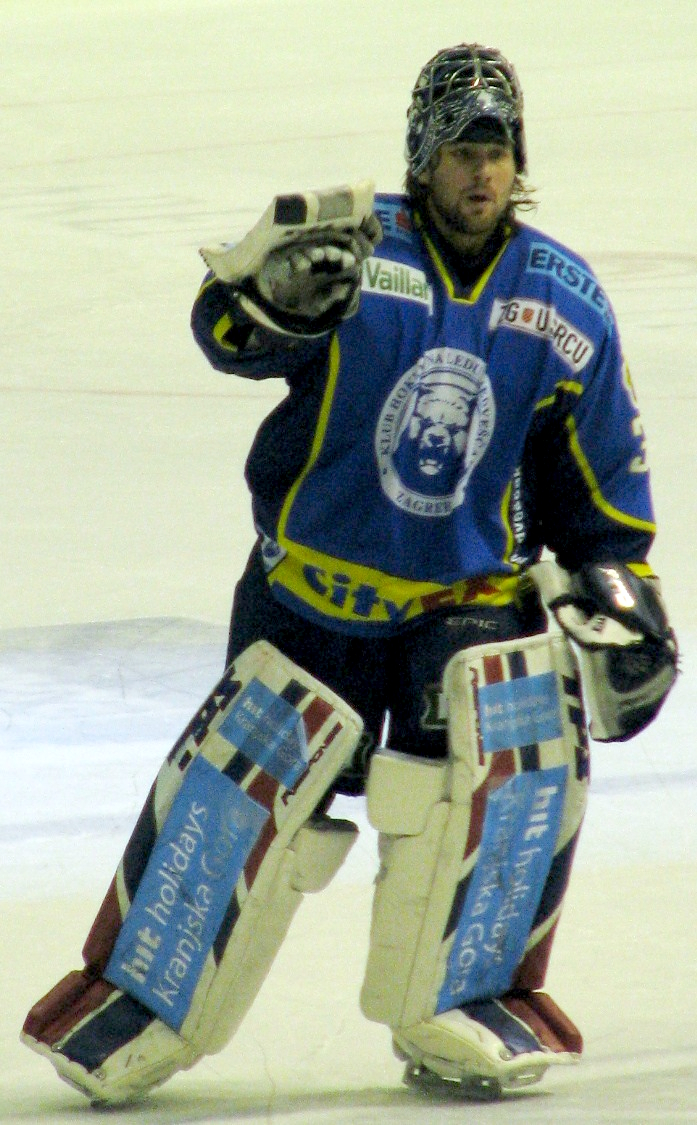
Kristan while a member of KHL Medveščak Zagreb in 2009.

Kristan played junior youth hockey within Slovenian club HK Jesenice. In 2000 he made his professional debut in the Slovenian league for Jesenice. After five years with Jesenice and one with fellow Slovenian club Olimpija Hertz Ljubljana, Kristian left for the Swedish Elitserien, signing with Brynäs IF for the 2006–07 season. In his only season in the Elitserien, Robert played in 33 games to lead Brynäs to the playoffs and recorded the best Goals against average of 2.23 in the entire SEL. In 2007–08 he returned to HK Jesenice to compete in the EBEL the following season, before again traveling to Sweden in 2008–09 to play with Mora IK of the HockeyAllsvenskan.

On 18 May 2009 he was again on the move and signed a one-year contract with Croatian team KHL Medveščak Zagreb in the EBEL for the 2009–10 season.

He participated at several IIHF World Championships as a member of the Slovenia men's national ice hockey team.

== Statistics ==
=== Regular season ===
- Team League Season GP GD G A P PIM GAA PCT
- Acroni Jesenice Slovenian League 00/01 25 0 1 1 0
- Acroni Jesenice International League 00/01 13 20 0 0 0 0 2.77 .863
- Acroni Jesenice International League 01/02 4 1.50 .684
- Acroni Jesenice Slovenian League 01/02 4 0 0 0 0
- Olimpija Hertz Ljubljana International League 02/03 13 16 0 0 0 2 1.46 .946
- Olimpija Hertz Ljubljana Slovenian League 02/03 26 0 0 0 0
- Acroni Jesenice International League 03/04 16 0 1 1 12
- Acroni Jesenice Slovenian League 04/05 22 0 0 0 27
- Acroni Jesenice Continental Cup 05/06 3 3 0 0 0 0 2.00 .904
- Acroni Jesenice International League 05/06 17 0 1 1 14
- Acroni Jesenice Slovenian League 05/06 23 0 0 0 14
- Brynäs IF J20 Superelit (SWE) 06/07 1 1 0 0 0 0 0.00 1.000
- Brynäs IF Elitserien 06/07 33 47 0 1 1 6 2.23 .909
- Acroni Jesenice Austrian League 07/08 39 41 0 0 0 31 2.99 .906

=== Playoffs ===
- Team League Season GP GD G A P PIM GAA PCT
- Olimpija Hertz Ljubljana Slovenian League 02/03 5 0 0 0 4
- Acroni Jesenice International League 03/04 7 0 0 1 2
- Acroni Jesenice Slovenian League 03/04 4 0 0 0 0
- Acroni Jesenice International League 05/06 6 0 0 1 2
- Brynäs IF Elitserien 06/07 5 5 0 0 1 22 3.38 .886
- Acroni Jesenice Austrian League 07/08 5 5 0 0 0 0 3.31 .898
- Acroni Jesenice Slovenian League 07/08 5 6 0 0 0 2 1.19

=== International statistics ===
- Team League Season GP GD G A P PIM GAA PCT
- Team Slovenia-Jr. EJC-I d1 99 2 4 0 0 0 0 3.50 .863
- Team Slovenia-Jr. EJC-I 2000 4 4 0 0 0 0 2.72 .845
- Team Slovenia-Jr. WJC-C 2000 4 4 0 0 0 0 3.27 .881
- Team Slovenia-U18 WJC18-II 2001 4 4 0 0 0 0 1.00 .959
- Team Slovenia-Jr. WJC-II 2001 4 4 0 0 0 0 1.75 .908
- Team Slovenia WC 2002 0 2
- Team Slovenia-Jr. WJC_I 2003 3 5 0 0 0 0 2.87 .918
- Team Slovenia WC 2003 1 3 0 0 0 0 7.00 .857
- Team Slovenia WC-I 2004 4 5 1.09 .952
- Team Slovenia WC 2005 1 1 7.00 .816
- Team Slovenia WC 2006 6 6 0 0 0 0 3.81 .887
- Team Slovenia WC 2008 4 4 0 0 0 0 4.66 .904

== Awards ==
- Best goaltender, 2001 World U18 Championships, Division II
- Best goaltender, 2001 World Junior Championships, Division II
- Best goalkeeper, Interliga 2004–05
- Playoffs MVP, Slovenian league 2007–08
