= Michal Važan =

Slovak ice hockey player

- Born: August 9, 1983 (age 41); Martin, Czechoslovakia
- Height: 5 ft 11 in (180 cm)
- Weight: 185 lb (84 kg; 13 st 3 lb)
- Position: Forward
- Shot: Right
- Played for: MHC Martin; MsHK Zilina
- NHL draft: Undrafted
- Playing career: 2002–2020

Michal Važan (born August 9, 1983) is a former Slovak professional ice hockey player who played in the Slovak Extraliga for MHC Martin and MsHK Zilina.
