= Lukáš Novák =

Czech ice hockey player

- Born: September 21, 1993 (age 31); Czech Republic
- Height: 5 ft 9 in (175 cm)
- Weight: 154 lb (70 kg; 11 st 0 lb)
- Position: Forward
- Shoots: Left
- Czech Extraliga team: Piráti Chomutov
- NHL draft: Undrafted
- Playing career: 2013–present

Lukáš Novák (born September 21, 1993) is a Czech professional ice hockey player. He currently plays with Piráti Chomutov in the Czech Extraliga.

Novák made his Czech Extraliga debut playing with Piráti Chomutov debut during the 2013–14 Czech Extraliga season.
