= Andrej Themár =

Slovak ice hockey player

- Born: June 28, 1988 (age 37) Martin, Czechoslovakia
- Height: 5 ft 9 in (175 cm)
- Weight: 187 lb (85 kg; 13 st 5 lb)
- Position: Left wing
- Shoots: Left
- team Former teams: Free agent MHC Martin; HC '05 Banská Bystrica; GKS Katowice; TH Unia Oświęcim
- Playing career: 2006–present

Andrej Themár (born June 28, 1988) is a Slovak professional ice hockey left winger. He is currently a free agent having last played for TH Unia Oświęcim of the Polska Hokej Liga.

Themár previously played in the Tipsport Liga in Slovakia for MHC Martin and HC '05 Banská Bystrica. He moved to GKS Katowice of the Polska Hokej Liga on September 6, 2017 and then moved to TH Unia Oświęcim the following year.
