= Jaroslav Markovič =

Slovak ice hockey player

- Born: 22 May 1985 (age 40) Martin, Czechoslovakia
- Height: 5 ft 11 in (180 cm)
- Weight: 176 lb (80 kg; 12 st 8 lb)
- Position: Forward
- Shoots: Left
- FFHG Division 1 team Former teams: Wildcats Epinal; MHC Martin; MHK Dolný Kubín; HC 07 Prešov; HKM Zvolen; HK Detva; HK Dukla Trenčín; HC Pardubice; Heilbronner Falken; HC Slavia Praha; VHK Vsetín; Vlci Žilina
- NHL draft: Undrafted
- Playing career: 2002–present

Jaroslav Markovič (born 22 May 1985) is a Slovak professional ice hockey player currently playing for Gamyo d'Épinal of the FFHG Division 1.

== Career statistics ==
=== Regular season and playoffs ===
			Regular season					Playoffs
Season	Team	League	GP	G	A	Pts	PIM	GP	G	A	Pts	PIM
