= Lukáš Matejka =

Slovak ice hockey player

- Born: February 21, 1990 (age 35); Martin, Czechoslovakia
- Height: 6 ft 2 in (188 cm)
- Weight: 185 lb (84 kg; 13 st 3 lb)
- Position: Defence
- Shoots: Left
- Slovak Extraliga team: MHC Martin
- NHL draft: Undrafted
- Playing career: 2009–present

Lukáš Matejka (born February 21, 1990) is a Slovak professional ice hockey defenceman who is currently playing with MHC Martin of the Slovak Extraliga.
