= Andrej Košarišťan =

Slovak ice hockey goaltender

- Born: 10 December 1993 (age 32) Dolný Kubín, Slovakia
- Height: 6 ft 1 in (185 cm)
- Weight: 181 lb (82 kg; 12 st 13 lb)
- Position: Goaltender
- Catches: Left
- Tipos SHL team Former teams: Vlci Žilina; HK Trnava; HC '05 Banská Bystrica; HC 07 Detva; ŠHK 37 Piešťany; MHk 32 Liptovský Mikuláš; HC Nové Zámky; HC Košice; Rytíři Kladno; HK Dukla Michalovce
- NHL draft: Undrafted
- Playing career: 2011–present

Andrej Košarišťan (born 10 December 1993) is a Slovak professional ice hockey goaltender. He is currently a player of Vlci Žilina in Slovak Tipos Extraliga.

== Career statistics ==
=== Regular season and playoffs ===
			Regular season										Playoffs
Season	Team	League	GP	W	L	T	OTL	MIN	GA	SO	GAA	SV%	GP	W	L	MIN	GA	SO	GAA	SV%
2011–12	HK Trnava	Slovak.1	2								2.01	.938	—	—	—	—	—	—	—	—
2019–20	HC Košice	Slovak
