= Miroslav Lipovský =

Slovak ice hockey player

- Born: November 19, 1976 (age 48); Skalica, Czechoslovakia
- Height: 5 ft 9 in (175 cm)
- Weight: 179 lb (81 kg; 12 st 11 lb)
- Position: Goaltender
- Caught: Left
- Played for: HK 36 Skalica; MsHK Žilina; MHk 32 Liptovský Mikuláš; HK Nitra; HC Košice; HK Poprad
- NHL draft: Undrafted
- Playing career: 1998–2023

Miroslav Lipovský (born November 19, 1976) is a Slovak former professional ice hockey goaltender who played with Frederikshavn White Hawks in the AL-Bank Ligaen during the 2011–12 season.
