= Martin Šúrek =

Slovak ice hockey goaltender

- Born: August 22, 1987 (age 37); Bratislava, Czechoslovakia
- Height: 5 ft 10 in (178 cm)
- Weight: 176 lb (80 kg; 12 st 8 lb)
- Position: Goaltender
- Caught: Left
- Played for: HK Nitra; HK Brest; MHC Martin; ŠHK 37 Piešťany; HK Poprad; Manglerud Star Ishockey; Scorpions de Mulhouse; Brest Albatros Hockey
- Playing career: 2006–2020

Martin Šúrek (born August 22, 1987) is a former Slovak professional ice hockey goaltender. He last played for Brest Albatros Hockey of the FFHG Division 1.

Šúrek previously played in the Tipsport Liga for HK Nitra, MHC Martin, ŠHK 37 Piešťany and HK Poprad. He also played in Belarus for HK Brest, Serbia for HK Partizan and in Norway for Tønsberg Vikings and Manglerud Star Ishockey before moving to France to join Scorpions de Mulhouse.
