= Matej Hamrák =

Slovak ice hockey forward

- Born: October 14, 1987 (age 38) Spišská Nová Ves, Czechoslovakia
- Height: 6 ft 0 in (183 cm)
- Weight: 181 lb (82 kg; 12 st 13 lb)
- Position: Forward
- Shoots: Right
- FFHG Division 1 team Former teams: Sangliers Arvernes de Clermont; HC Vítkovice; HK Spišská Nová Ves; HC '05 Banská Bystrica; HK Nitra; ŠHK 37 Piešťany; Aigles de Nice
- Playing career: 2005–present

Matej Hamrák (born October 14, 1987) is a Slovak professional ice hockey forward playing for Sangliers Arvernes de Clermont of the FFHG Division 1.

Hamrák previously played thirteen games for HC Vítkovice of the Czech Extraliga during the 2006–07 season. He also played in the Tipsport Liga for HK Spišská Nová Ves, HC '05 Banská Bystrica, HK Nitra and ŠHK 37 Piešťany.

Since 2015, Hamrák has played in France, beginning with Aigles de Nice where he spent three seasons until 2018. He then signed for Cosaires de Nantes and played two seasons there before joining Sangliers Arvernes de Clermont on July 7, 2020.
