= Roman Tomas =

Slovak ice hockey player

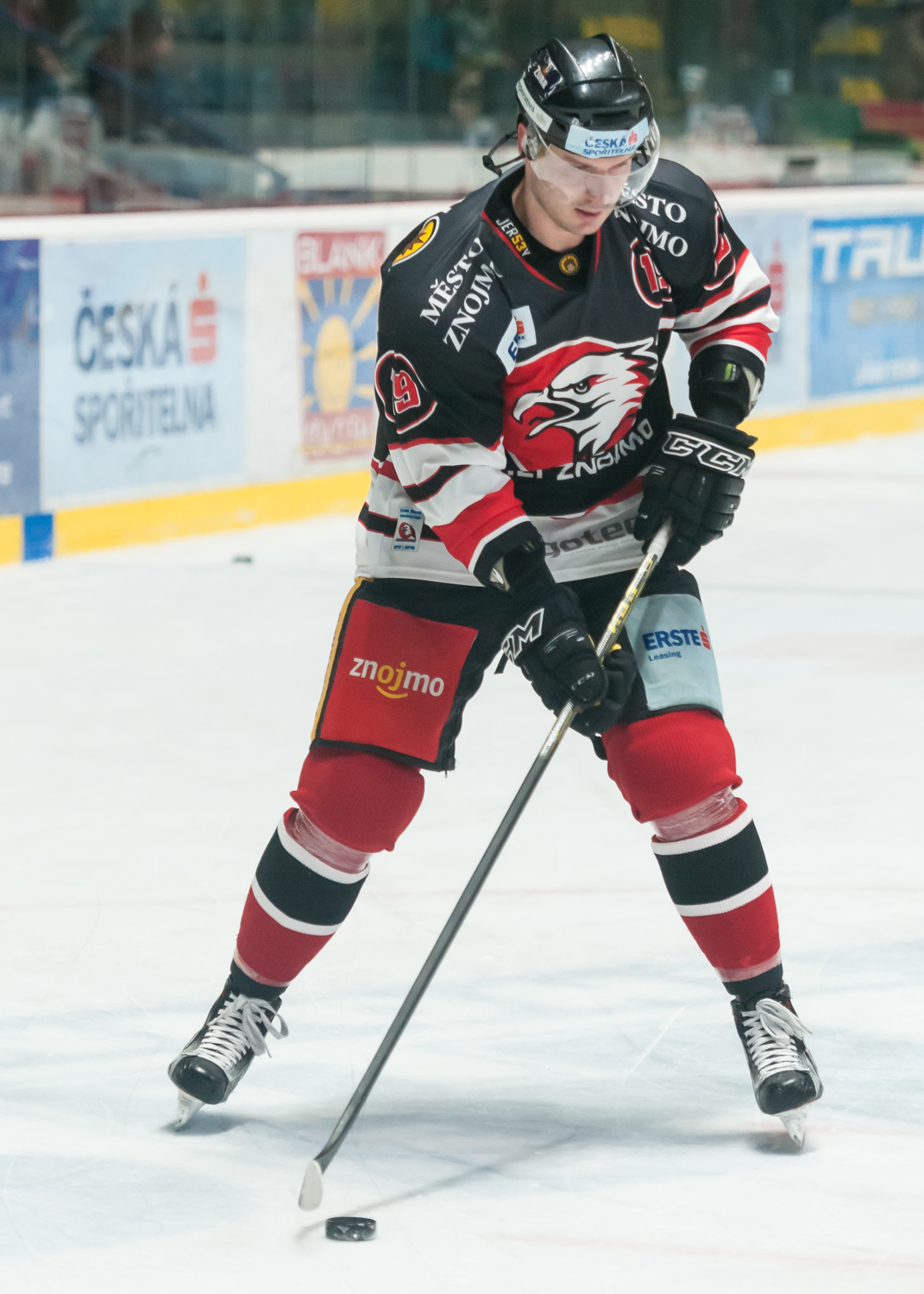
- Born: September 9, 1980 (age 44); Poprad, Czechoslovakia
- Height: 6 ft 1 in (185 cm)
- Weight: 203 lb (92 kg; 14 st 7 lb)
- Position: Forward
- Shot: Right
- Played for: HK ŠKP Poprad; HC Košice; HC Oceláři Třinec; HC Litvínov; BK Mladá Boleslav; HC Plzeň; HC Vítkovice; KHL Medveščak Zagreb; MsHK Žilina; Orli Znojmo; Boxers de Bordeaux
- Playing career: 1999–2018

Roman Tomas (born September 9, 1980) is a Slovak former professional ice hockey Forward.

He previously played with HC Vítkovice in the Czech Extraliga during the 2010–11 Czech Extraliga season.
