= Tomáš Tomek =

Slovak ice hockey goaltender

- Born: 10 July 1988 (age 36); Skalica, Czechoslovakia
- Height: 6 ft 2 in (188 cm)
- Weight: 207 lb (94 kg; 14 st 11 lb)
- Position: Goaltender
- Shoots: Left
- team Former teams: Free agent HK 36 Skalica; HK 91 Senica; HC Nové Zámky; ŠHK 37 Piešťany; Orli Znojmo; SC Riessersee; MsHK Žilina; HKM Zvolen; HK Dukla Michalovce; HK Poprad
- NHL draft: Undrafted
- Playing career: 2008–present

Tomáš Tomek (born 10 July 1988) is a Slovak professional ice hockey goaltender. He is currently a free agent.

== Career ==
Tomek previously played for HC Nové Zámky, HK Skalica, ŠHK 37 Piešťany and HKM Zvolen. He also played for MsHK Žilina. He also played for the Orli Znojmo of the EBEL during the 2014–15 season.

== Career statistics ==
=== Regular season and playoffs ===
			Regular season										Playoffs
Season	Team	League	GP	W	L	OTL	MIN	GA	SO	GAA	SV%	GP	W	L	MIN	GA	SO	GAA	SV%
2020–21	HK Dukla Michalovce	Slovak	43	28	11	4	2,479	86	4	2.08	.928	7	3	4	374	21	0	3.14	.888
2021–22	HK Poprad	Slovak
