= Petr Obdržálek =

Czech ice hockey player

- Born: 26 September 1986 (age 39) Brno, Czechoslovakia
- Height: 5 ft 10 in (178 cm)
- Weight: 179 lb (81 kg; 12 st 11 lb)
- Position: Forward
- Shoots: Right
- Slovak 1. Liga team Former teams: HK Skalica; SHK Hodonín; HC Kometa Brno; HC Šumperk; SK Horácká Slavia Třebíč; HC Plzeň; Rytíři Kladno; IHC Písek; HKM Zvolen; HC RT Torax Poruba; HC Nové Zámky; MHk 32 Liptovský Mikuláš; HK Dukla Trenčín
- Playing career: 2004–present

Petr Obdržálek (born 26 September 1986) is a Czech-Slovak professional ice hockey left winger who currently playing for HK Skalica of the Slovak 1. Liga.

Obdržálek previously played in the Czech Extraliga for HC Plzeň and Rytíři Kladno. He has also played for HKM Zvolen and HC Nové Zámky.

== Career statistics ==
=== Regular season and playoffs ===
			Regular season					Playoffs
Season	Team	League	GP	G	A	Pts	PIM	GP	G	A	Pts	PIM
2021–22	MHk 32 Liptovský Mikuláš	Slovak	35	5	17	22	14	—	—	—	—	—
