= 2015–16 Slovak Extraliga season =

- League: Slovak Extraliga
- Sport: Ice hockey
- Duration: September 2015 – April 2016

Regular season
- League Champion: HC Košice
- Runners-up: HK Nitra
- Top scorer: Lukáš Hvila (Banská Bystrica)

Playoffs
- Playoffs MVP: David Laliberté (Nitra)
- Finals champions: HK Nitra
- Runners-up: HC ’05 Banská Bystrica

Slovak Extraliga seasons
- 2014–15 2016–17

The 2015–16 Slovak Extraliga season was the 23rd season of the Slovak Extraliga, the highest level of ice hockey in Slovakia.

== Teams ==
The following teams are participating in the 2015–16 season. The HK Orange 20 is a project for preparation of the Slovakia junior ice hockey team for the IIHF World U20 Championship. The team do not play complete regular season and cannot promote to the playoffs or get relegated. First 8 teams in table after the regular season (50 games) will promote to the playoffs.

Extraliga teams for the 2015-16 season.

Team name	Location	Venue	Capacity	Titles	2014-15
HKm Zvolen	Zvolen	Zvolen Ice Stadium	7,038	2	Quarterfinalists
HC Košice	Košice	Steel Aréna	8,378	7	Champions
HK Nitra	Nitra	Nitra Aréna	3,600	0	Semifinalists
ŠHK 37 Piešťany	Piešťany	EASTON Aréna	3,050	0	Quarterfinalists
HC ’05 Banská Bystrica	Banská Bystrica	Banská Bystrica Ice Stadium	3,518	0	Finalists
HK 36 Skalica	Skalica	Skalica Ice Stadium	4,100	0	9th
HK Dukla Trenčín	Trenčín	Pavol Demitra Ice Stadium	6,150	3	Quarterfinalists
HK Poprad	Poprad	Poprad Ice Stadium	4,050	0	Semifinalists
MsHK Žilina	Žilina	Garmin Arena	6,200	1	10th
MHC Mountfield	Martin	Martin Ice Stadium	4,200	0	Quarterfinalists
HK Orange 20	Bratislava	Vladimír Dzurilla Ice Stadium	3,500	–	–

== Regular season ==
Pos	Team	Pld	W	OTW	OTL	L	GF	GA	GD	Pts	Final Result
1	Košice	50	28	9	4	9	156	85	+71	106	Advance to Quarterfinals
2	Nitra	50	30	3	1	16	160	129	+31	97	Advance to Quarterfinals
3	Zvolen	50	24	7	6	13	171	131	+40	89	Advance to Quarterfinals
4	Banská Bystrica	50	25	4	5	16	155	115	+40	88	Advance to Quarterfinals
5	Trenčín	50	16	7	7	20	114	143	−29	69	Advance to Quarterfinals
6	Poprad	50	18	3	11	18	139	149	−10	68	Advance to Quarterfinals
7	Žilina	50	18	4	6	22	117	138	−21	68	Advance to Quarterfinals
8	Martin	50	14	4	5	27	106	126	−20	55	Advance to Quarterfinals
9	Piešťany	50	11	7	4	28	115	156	−41	51	Relegation series
	HK Orange 20	18	1	1	0	16	22	83	−61	5	
	Skalica	0	0	0	0	0	0	0	0	0	Denied an "elite license" for financial reasons, relegated

Source: Tipsport Liga
Rules for classification: 1) Points; 2) Head-to-head points.

== Playoffs ==
The seeding in Play-off is based on the ranking in Regular season. All Play-off rounds are played in the best-of-seven format, with the higher seeded team having the home advantage for the possible seventh game.

=== Playoff bracket ===
Quarterfinals
2	Nitra	4
7	Žilina	0
3	Zvolen	4
6	Poprad	1
1	Košice	4
8	Martin	0
4	Banská Bystrica	4
5	Trenčín	1

Semifinals
2	Nitra	4
3	Zvolen	3
1	Košice	2
4	Banská Bystrica	4

Finals
2	Nitra	4
4	Banská Bystrica	2

== Relegation series (PlayOut) ==
Pos	Team	Pld	W	OTW	OTL	L	GF	GA	GD	Pts	Final Result
1	Nové Zámky	8	4	0	1	3	26	22	+4	13	Will play in 2016–17 Slovak Extraliga season
2	Piešťany	8	2	3	0	3	23	25	−2	12	Will play in 2016–17 Slovak Extraliga season
3	Bardejov	8	3	0	2	3	17	19	−2	11	Will play in 2016–17 Slovak 1. Liga season
4	Skalica	0	0	0	0	0	0	0	0	0	Denied an "elite license" for financial reasons, relegated

Source: Tipsport Liga

Rules for classification: 1) Points; 2) Head-to-head points.

== Final rankings ==
Gold medal	Nitra
Silver medal	Banská Bystrica
Bronze medal	Košice
4	Zvolen
5	Trenčín
6	Poprad
7	Žilina
8	Martin
9	Piešťany
