= Marek Šimko =

Slovak ice hockey goaltender

- Born: February 5, 1991 (age 35) Bratislava, Czechoslovakia
- Height: 6 ft 4 in (193 cm)
- Weight: 201 lb (91 kg; 14 st 5 lb)
- Position: Goaltender
- Catches: Left
- Slovak 2. Liga team Former teams: HK Bardejov; MHC Martin; HKm Zvolen; Yertis Pavlodar; HC Nové Zámky; HK Dukla Trenčín; MHk 32 Liptovský Mikuláš; HKM Rimavská Sobota
- Playing career: 2008–present

Marek Šimko (born January 11, 1988) is a Slovak professional ice hockey goaltender who currently plays for HK Bardejov of the Slovak 2. Liga.

== Career ==
Šimko began his career with HKm Zvolen, playing for their U18 and U20 teams. During the 2005–06 season, he had a spell with HC '05 Banská Bystrica at U20 level, including one game for their senior team in the Slovak 1. Liga. He then had spells in the Czech Republic at U20 level for HC Dynamo Pardubice, Stadion Hradec Králové and HC Havířov, as well as nine games for HC Orlova in the Czech 2. Liga during the 2007–08 season.

Šimko returned to Slovakia in 2008, spending two seasons in the Slovak 1. Liga with HC 07 Detva and HK Trnava before joining MHC Martin of the Tipsport Liga in 2010. Šimko returned to HKm Zvolen in 2012 as their starting goaltender. After three seasons, he moved to Yertis Pavlodar of the Kazakhstan Hockey Championship for one season before returning to Slovakia for HC Nové Zámky for the 2016–17 season. He played just ten games before returning to Zvolen once more.

On June 11, 2018, Šimko joined HK Dukla Trenčín but was later traded to MHk 32 Liptovský Mikuláš on January 23, 2019, for Juraj Hollý. On May 23, 2019, Šimko rejoined HC 07 Detva, eight years after he last played for the team.
