= Michal Dzubina =

Slovak ice hockey player

- Born: January 19, 1983 (age 42) Martin, Slovakia
- Height: 6 ft 2 in (188 cm)
- Weight: 220 lb (100 kg; 15 st 10 lb)
- Position: Goaltender
- Caught: Left
- Played for: MHC Martin; HKM Zvolen; HC Banská Bystrica
- NHL draft: Undrafted
- Playing career: 2001–2018

Michal Dzubina (born January 19, 1983) is a former Slovak professional ice hockey goaltender who played in the Slovak Extraliga for MHC Martin, HKM Zvolen, and HC Banská Bystrica.
