= Petr Kafka =

Czech ice hockey player (born 1989)

- Born: October 2, 1989 (age 35); Prague, Czechoslovakia
- Height: 6 ft 0 in (183 cm)
- Weight: 194 lb (88 kg; 13 st 12 lb)
- Position: Forward
- Shoots: Left
- team Former teams: Free agent HC Sparta Praha; HC Kladno; HC '05 Banská Bystrica; HC Olomouc; HC Vítkovice; HC Košice
- Playing career: 2008–present

Petr Kafka
Medal record

Representing Czech Republic

Men's Roller inline hockey

World Games
Bronze medal – third place	2013 Cali	Team

Petr Kafka (born October 2, 1989) is a Czech professional ice hockey player. He is currently a free agent having last played for HC Košice of the Slovak Extraliga.

Kafka previously played HC Sparta Praha, HC Kladno, HC '05 Banská Bystrica, HC Olomouc and HC Vítkovice
