= Richard Jenčík =

Slovak ice hockey player

- Born: January 1, 1985 (age 41) Košice, Czechoslovakia
- Height: 5 ft 9 in (175 cm)
- Weight: 165 lb (75 kg; 11 st 11 lb)
- Position: Right wing
- Shot: Left
- Played for: HK Trebišov; HC Košice; HC Prešov; MHK Humenné; MHK Kežmarok; HC 46 Bardejov; KS Cracovia; MsHK Žilina; Podhale Nowy Targ
- NHL draft: Undrafted
- Playing career: 2002–2020

Richard Jenčík (born January 1, 1985) is a former Slovak ice hockey player.

== Career ==
Jenčik previously spent the majority of his career playing for HC Košice. He also had spells with MHK Kežmarok as well as a spell in the Polska Hokej Liga for KS Cracovia.

== Career statistics ==
=== International ===
Year	Team	Event	Result	GP	G	A	Pts	PIM
2005	Slovakia	WJC	7th	6	0	2	2	0
Junior totals				6	0	2	2	0
