= 2014–15 Slovak Extraliga season =

- League: Slovak Extraliga
- Sport: Ice hockey
- Duration: September 2014 – April 2015

Regular season
- League Champion: HC Košice
- Runners-up: HK Nitra
- Top scorer: Petr Kafka (Banská Bystrica)

Playoffs
- Playoffs MVP: Gabriel Spilar (Košice)
- Finals champions: HC Košice
- Runners-up: HC ’05 Banská Bystrica

Slovak Extraliga seasons
- 2013–14 2015–16

The 2014–15 Slovak Extraliga season was the 22nd season of the Slovak Extraliga, the highest level of ice hockey in Slovakia.

== Teams ==
The following teams are participating in the 2014–15 season. The HK Orange 20 is a project for preparation of the Slovakia junior ice hockey team for the IIHF World U20 Championship. The team do not play complete regular season and cannot promote to the playoffs or get relegated. First 8 teams in table after the regular season (56 games) will promote to the playoffs.

Extraliga teams for the 2014-15 season.

Team name	Location	Venue	Capacity	Titles	2013-14
HKm Zvolen	Zvolen	Zvolen Ice Stadium	7,038	2	Quarterfinalists
HC Košice	Košice	Steel Aréna	8,378	7	Champions
HK Nitra	Nitra	Nitra Aréna	3,600	0	Runners-up
ŠHK 37 Piešťany	Piešťany	EASTON Aréna	3,050	0	Semifinalists
HC ’05 Banská Bystrica	Banská Bystrica	Banská Bystrica Ice Stadium	3,518	0	Semifinalists
HK 36 Skalica	Skalica	Skalica Ice Stadium	4,100	0	Quarterfinalists
HK Dukla Trenčín	Trenčín	Pavol Demitra Ice Stadium	6,150	3	9th
HK Poprad	Poprad	Poprad Ice Stadium	4,050	0	Quarterfinalists
MsHK Žilina	Žilina	Garmin Arena	6,200	1	10th
MHC Mountfield	Martin	Martin Ice Stadium	4,200	0	Quarterfinalists
HK Orange 20	Bratislava	Vladimír Dzurilla Ice Stadium	3,500	–	–

== Regular season ==
Pos	Team	Pld	W	OTW	OTL	L	GF	GA	GD	Pts	Final Result
1	Košice	56	35	6	6	9	166	105	+61	123	Advance to Quarterfinals
2	Nitra	56	30	7	6	13	201	141	+60	110	Advance to Quarterfinals
3	Banská Bystrica	56	29	6	7	14	188	142	+46	106	Advance to Quarterfinals
4	Zvolen	56	28	4	7	17	175	161	+14	99	Advance to Quarterfinals
5	Poprad	56	27	8	1	20	168	124	+44	98	Advance to Quarterfinals
6	Trenčín	56	21	11	3	21	141	120	+21	88	Advance to Quarterfinals
7	Martin	56	17	6	10	23	140	157	−17	73	Advance to Quarterfinals
8	Piešťany	56	17	5	6	28	148	201	−53	67	Advance to Quarterfinals
9	Skalica	56	14	2	6	34	136	217	−81	52	
10	Žilina	56	12	2	7	35	128	184	−56	47	Relegation series
11	HK Orange 20	20	1	2	0	17	29	68	−39	7	

Source: Tipsport extraliga
Rules for classification: 1) Points; 2) Head-to-head points.

== Relegation series ==
Relegation series will be played between MsHK Žilina, the 10th team in regular season, and HC 07 Detva, the winner of 1.liga. The winner of best-of-seven series will play in Extraliga in 2015–16 season.

=== PlayOut ===
12 March 2015; 17:00	Žilina	7–2 (4–0, 1–2, 2–0)	Detva	Garmin Arena, Žilina; Attendance: 1,029

Game reference
10 min	Penalties	10 min
39	Shots	21

13 March 2015; 17:00	Žilina	5–6 (1–1, 0–3, 4–2)	Detva	Garmin Arena, Žilina; Attendance: 1,165

Game reference
12 min	Penalties	14 min
43	Shots	33

16 March 2015; 18:00	Detva	1–6 (0–4, 1–0, 0–2)	Žilina	Detva Ice Stadium, Detva; Attendance: 1,600

Game reference
20 min	Penalties	36 min
34	Shots	30

17 March 2015; 18:00	Detva	1–3 (1–2, 0–1, 0–0)	Žilina	Detva Ice Stadium, Detva; Attendance: 955

Game reference
28 min	Penalties	12 min
37	Shots	36

19 March 2015; 17:00	Žilina	3–2 (0–1, 2–0, 1–1)	Detva	Garmin Arena, Žilina; Attendance: 1,012

Game reference
8 min	Penalties	20 min
60	Shots	24

Žilina wins the series 4-1 and will play in 2015–16 Slovak Extraliga season

== Playoffs ==
The seeding in Play-off is based on the ranking in Regular season. All Play-off rounds are played in the best-of-seven format, with the higher seeded team having the home advantage for the possible seventh game.

=== Playoff bracket ===
Quarterfinals
1	Košice	4
8	Piešťany	2
4	Zvolen	3
5	Poprad	4
2	Nitra	4
7	Martin	1
3	Banská Bystrica	4
6	Trenčín	1

Semifinals
1	Košice	4
5	Poprad	1
2	Nitra	3
3	Banská Bystrica	4

Finals
1	Košice	4
3	Banská Bystrica	2

== Final rankings ==
Gold medal	Košice
Silver medal	Banská Bystrica
Bronze medal	Nitra
4	Poprad
5	Zvolen
6	Trenčín
7	Martin
8	Piešťany
9	Skalica
10	Žilina
