= Skalica Ice Stadium =

Ice hockey arena in Slovakia

- Interactive map of Skalica Ice Stadium
- Location: Skalica, Slovakia
- Coordinates: 48°50′28″N 17°13′32″E
- Capacity: 4,095
- Current use: Ice hockey

Construction
- Opened: 1969

Tenant
- HK 36 Skalica

Skalica – Zimný Štadión is an ice hockey arena in Skalica, Slovakia. Also known as Hant Aréna, it is the home arena of HK 36 Skalica, and hosted top-level hockey concluding in the 2014–15 Slovak Extraliga season. Built in 1969, its capacity of 4,095 people is among the top ten in the country.
