= Alexandr Hylák =

Czech ice hockey player

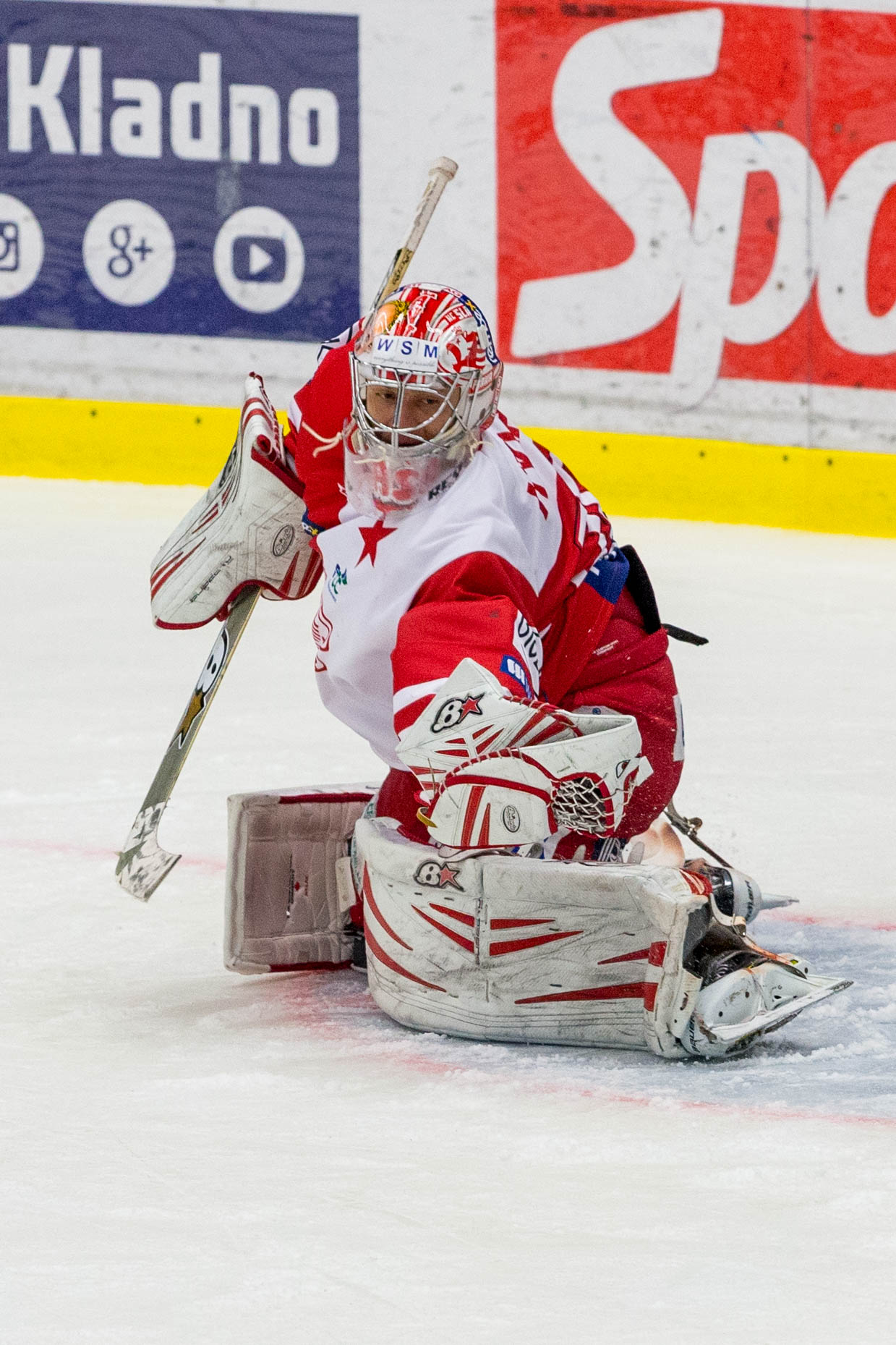
- Born: December 25, 1983 (age 42) Pardubice, Czechoslovakia
- Height: 6 ft 0 in (183 cm)
- Weight: 156 lb (71 kg; 11 st 2 lb)
- Position: Goaltender
- Catches: Left
- Slovakia Extraliga team Former teams: HC Košice; HC Pardubice
- Playing career: 2003–present

Alexandr Hylák (Born December 25, 1983) is a Czech professional ice hockey goaltender currently playing for HC Košice of the Slovakia Extraliga.

Hylák began his career with his hometown team, HC Moeller Pardubice, playing for their under-20 team. In 2003, he made his debut for the parent team before moving to TJ SC Kolín of the 1. národní hokejová liga in order to gain experience. For the next three seasons, he would split his time between Pardubice and HC VCES Hradec Králové and would also have spells with Hokej Šumperk 2003 and HC Vrchlabí during the 2007–08 season.

In 2008, Hylák moved to HC Kometa Brno in the 1.liga and became their starting goalie. In 2009, the team joined the Czech Extraliga having bought the license for the league from HC Znojemští Orli.

== Playing career ==
- 1999/2000 HC ČSOB Pojišťovna Pardubice (dor)
- 2000/2001 HC ČSOB Pojišťovna Pardubice (jun)
- 2001/2002 HC ČSOB Pojišťovna Pardubice (jun)
- 2002/2003 HC ČSOB Pojišťovna Pardubice (jun)
- 2003/2004 HC Moeller Pardubice (E, jun)

TJ SC Kolín (2. liga)

- 2004/2005 HC Moeller Pardubice (E)

HC VCES Hradec Králové (1. liga)

- 2005/2006 HC Moeller Pardubice (E)
- 2006/2007 HC VCES Hradec Králové (1. liga)
- 2007/2008 HC Moeller Pardubice (E)

Hokej Šumperk 2003 (1. liga)
HC VCES Hradec Králové (1. liga)
HC Vrchlabí (1. liga)

- 2008/2009 HC Kometa Brno (1. liga)
- 2009/2010 HC Kometa Brno (E)
- Total played in Extraliga: 32 games and his save percentage is 90,85%. (at the end of the season 2008/2009)
