= Banská Bystrica Ice Stadium =

Indoor ice hockey arena in Banská Bystrica, Slovakia

Coordinates: 48°44′02″N 19°09′17″E

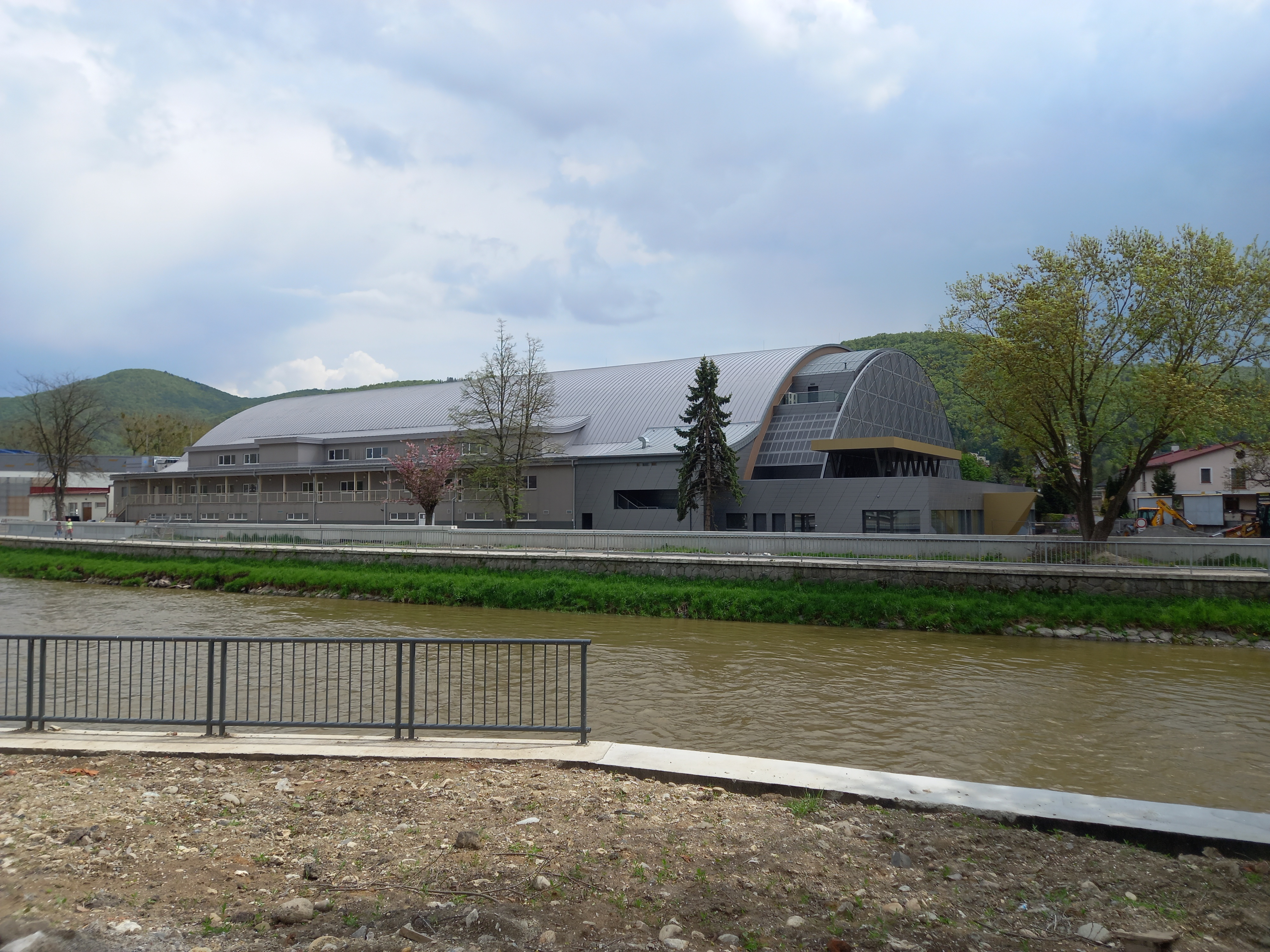
The arena in May 2023

Tipsport Arena is an indoor ice hockey arena in Banská Bystrica, Slovakia.

The arena, opened in 1956, seats 3,016 people, and is home to HC 05 Banska Bystrica.

== Notable events ==
An overview of some sport events:

1977

- 1977 IIHF World Under-20 Championship
