= HK Orange 20 =

- City: Piešťany, Slovakia
- League: Slovak Extraliga; Slovak 1.Liga
- Founded: 2007
- Folded: 2019
- Home arena: Patrícia Ice Arena 37 (capacity 3,238)
- Colours: Orange, white, black
- Website: www.hockeyslovakia.sk

HK Orange 20 was an ice hockey team, which has played in the Slovak Extraliga since the 2007–08 season to 2018–19 season.

The team was established after a disappointing performance by the Slovakia men's national junior ice hockey team in the previous world junior championship. The youth players from across the league were placed on the team, with a notable amount coming from HK Dukla Trenčín and HC Slovan Bratislava.

The team only plays games on Fridays and Sundays. It is also excluded from the last week before the winter break as the team prepares for the IIHF World U20 Championship and from the playoffs.
