= HK 36 Skalica =

HK Skalica
- City: Skalica, Slovakia
- League: 1.Liga
- Founded: 1936 (2016)
- Home arena: Skalica Ice Stadium (capacity 4,100)
- Colours: Green, red, white
- General manager: (Slovakia) Ivan Dornič
- Head coach: (Czech Republic) Leo Gudas
- Captain: (Czech Republic) / (Slovakia) Juraj Jurík
- Website: www.hkskalica.sk

HK Skalica is a professional ice hockey team based in Skalica, Slovakia. It has been a member of the Slovak Extraliga since 1997–98 season, when the squad was promoted from the Slovak 1.Liga. Team is currently playing in the second highest league Slovak 1. Liga in Slovakia.

== History ==
=== Czechoslovak era ===
The club was founded in 1936, but it had been playing in organized competition since 1947 under the name Sokol Tekla. The squad was renamed several times. In 1953, it was called Tatran, and between the years 1963-1993, the club played as ZVL. Its first major success was promotion to the first 1. SNHL (1st. Slovak National Hockey League), second level of Czechoslovak hockey, in the 1973–74 season. The team placed 6th in its first season in the 1. SNHL. However, its best placement was 4th in the 1976–77 and the 1977-78 season. It played in the 1. SNHL consecutively until 1989.

=== Slovak era ===
After the dissolution of Czechoslovakia in 1993, the club was included in the Slovak 1.Liga. It was at this point renamed to HK 36. In the 1996–97 season, the squad was promoted to the Slovak Extraliga. In its first season, Skalica placed 6th in the regular season and was beaten by ŠKP Poprad in the quarterfinals. In the 1998–99 season, the club placed 3rd in the regular season, defeating ŠKP Poprad in the quarterfinals but losing to HC Košice in the semifinals. Skalica won bronze medals because second defeated semifinalist HKm Zvolen had worse placement after the regular season. The following seasons were less successful for the club, as it did not reach the semifinals for nine years. In the 2007–08 season, the squad defeated HKm Zvolen in the quarterfinals but it was in turn beaten by HC Košice in the semifinals. Skalica won bronze medals for a second time because it had managed a better placement after the regular season than Dukla Trenčín. The club's greatest success came during the 2008–09 season, when Skalica placed 3rd in the regular season. In the quarterfinals, it won the series 4–0 against Dukla Trenčín. The club later defeated HC Slovan Bratislava 4–3 in the semifinals, but lost 4–2 to HC Košice in the finals. Žigmund Pálffy was the scoring leader in the regular season (99 Pts) and in the playoffs (27 Pts). Juraj Mikúš also had a great season and was the second-highest scorer (90 Pts) in the Extraliga after Pálffy. HK 36 was forced to leave the Extraliga in 2016 due to lack of funds. The team left prior to their 47th round contest vs. MHC Mountfield due to lack of funds and the exodus of players before the end of the transfer window.

== Honours ==
=== Domestic ===
Slovak Extraliga

- (silver) Runners-up (1): 2008–09
- (bronze) 3rd place (2): 1998–99, 2007–08

Slovak 1. Liga

- (silver) Runners-up (3): 1996–97, 2016–17, 2017–18
- (bronze) 3rd place (4): 1993–94, 1994–95, 1995–96, 2021–22

=== Pre-season ===
Rona Cup

- (gold) Winners (1): 2012
