= List of players in Slovakia men's national ice hockey team =

This is the list of all players that appeared in Slovak national ice hockey team in the years 1940–1943 and since 1993.

As of 12 May 2015

== 1940–1943 ==
=== Skaters ===
Name	Pos	Birthplace	In team	Pld	G
Vladimír Bartošek^{†}		Breza Visoko	1942	1	0
Emil Bihary^{†}		Veľká Poľana	1940	3	0
Alfréd Bollardt	D	Podlanig	1943	1	0
Štefan Demko^{†}		Prešov	1940–1941	9	0
Emil Fábry^{†}		Ondrašová	1943	1	0
Dušan Faško^{†}		Brezno	1942–1943	2	0
Rudolf Horský^{†}		Bratislava	1942–1943	3	0
Viliam Chmel^{†}		Timișoara	1940–1941	6	1
Ivan Chodák^{†}		Dolný Kubín	1940	3	0
František Javúrek^{†}		Brno	1940–1942	10	5
Juraj Kočan^{†}		Šarišské Michaľany	1942–1943	2	0
Anton Luther^{†}		Poprad	1940–1943	11	2
Ján Mistrík^{†}		Zvolen	1942	1	0
Oto Okoličány^{†}		Likavka	1940–1943	7	0
Ján Olejník^{†}		Solivar	1940–1941	9	3
Teodor Reimann^{†}		Zvolen	1941–1943	8	3
Július Slavkovský^{†}		Spišská Nová Ves	1942	1	0
Jozef Smetanay^{†}		Dolný Kubín	1943	1	0
Karol Smida^{†}		Tisovec	1940–1941	9	0
Ladislav Srnka^{†}		Vrútky	1943	1	1
Martin Štolc^{†}		Hranovnica	1940–1941	9	2
Rudolf Tomášek^{†}		Margecany	1940–1941	6	1
Svätozár Trnovský^{†}		Nové Mesto nad Váhom	1941–1943	8	1

=== Goalkeepers ===
Name	Birthplace	In team	Games Played
František Dibarbora^{†}	Bratislava	1940	3
Jozef Fulka^{†}	Preseľany	1940	3
Ján Grünn^{†}	Sv. Gottard	1941–1942	4
Jozef Kuchár^{†}	Trnava	1942–1943	2
Ján Petrovič^{†}	Kostiviarska	1941	6
Alexander Škovran^{†}	Budapešť	1942	1

== Since 1993 ==
=== Skaters ===
Name	Pos	Birthplace	In team	Total		World Championships						Olympic Games					
Name	Pos	Birthplace	In team	Pld	G	Pld	G	A	Pts	PIM	+/–	Pld	G	A	Pts	PIM	+/–
Dušan Andrašovský	RW	Zvolen	1998–2004	25	5												
Daniel Babka	D	Martin	1997–2007	44	4	12	1	0	1	6	0						
Jerguš Bača	D	Liptovský Mikuláš	1993–2002	75	5	17	0	3	3	14	+2	8	1	2	3	10	
Martin Bakoš	LW	Spišská Nová Ves	2011–	16	1												
Vladislav Baláž	C	Prešov	2010–	5	0												
Jozef Balej	RW	Myjava	2006–2009	6	0												
Ivan Baranka	D	Ilava	2009–	82	6	25	0	4	4	14	–3	7	1	0	1	0	+1
Peter Barinka	C	Trenčín	1999–2006	14	3												
Marek Bartánus	RW	Liptovský Mikuláš	2009–	9	2												
Ľuboš Bartečko	LW	Kežmarok	2000–2011	107	22	42	10	9	19	40	+10	17	0	2	2	6	–3
Martin Bartek	RW	Zvolen	2003–	39	10	8	1	0	1	0	0						
Peter Bartoš	LW	Martin	1993–2001	93	23	21	3	3	6	6	+3						
Milan Bartovič	LW	Trenčín	2006–	88	20	36	8	6	14	34	–2	4	0	1	1	0	–4
Michal Beran	C	Martin	1995–1998	9	1												
Jiří Bicek	LW	Košice	1996–2009	32	4	14	1	0	1	6	–5						
Marek Biro	D	Banská Bystrica	2010–	2	0												
Mário Bližňák	C	Trenčín	2011–	58	3	25	1	4	5	10	–9						
Slavomír Bodnár	D	Prešov	2006	1	0												
Tomáš Bokroš	D	Trenčín	2014–	6	0												
Peter Bondra	RW	Lutsk, Ukraine	1993–2006	47	35	17	10	4	14	26	+15	8	5	0	5	27	–1
Dalibor Bortňak	F	Prešov	2014–	4	0												
Ján Brejčák	D	Poprad	2010–	25	2												
Dávid Buc	LW	Poprad	2007–	5	0												
Matej Bukna	D	Bratislava	1993–1996	10	0												
Tomáš Bulík	C	Prešov	2008–	33	1	6	0	0	0	4	–2						
Vladimír Búřil	D	Bratislava	1993–1999	27	1							4	0	0	0	0	
Juraj Cebák	D	Prievidza	2011–	4	0												
Peter Cehlárik	LW/RW	Žilina	2015–	6	0												
Martin Cibák	C	Liptovský Mikuláš	2004–	55	6	10	2	2	4	10	0	7	0	0	0	6	–1
Zdeno Cíger	LW	Martin	1993–2003	108	34	32	11	12	23	14	–1	4	1	1	2	4	+1
Lukáš Cingeľ	RW/LW	Žilina	2014–	5	0												
Marián Cisár	RW	Bratislava	2001–2004	15	3												
Viliam Čacho	LW		2006	3	1												
Martin Čakajík	D	Trenčín	1999–2003	27	3												
Erik Čaládi	RW	Nitra	2008	4	0												
Roman Čech	D	Havlíčkův Brod, Czech Republic	2001	2	0												
Peter Čerešňák	D	Trenčín	2013–	25	1	7	0	0	0	2	–2						
Erik Černák	D	Košice	2015–	3	1												
Michal Česnek	D	Košice	2003	3	0												
Matej Češík	C	Banská Bystrica	2011–	2	0												
Ivan Čiernik	RW	Levice	2004–2010	66	17	23	7	5	12	18	+4						
Ladislav Čierny	D	Zvolen	1994–2007	123	11	27	1	3	4	22	+3						
Jozef Čierny	LW	Zvolen	1999–2004	12	1												
Jozef Daňo	LW	Nitra	1993–2000	117	45	31	11	17	28	20	0	12	4	5	9	10	–1
Marko Daňo	W	Eisenstadt, Austria	2012–	11	2	5	1	1	2	2	–1						
Rastislav Dej	LW	Považská Bystrica	2010–	9	0												
Pavol Demitra^{†}	C	Dubnica	1996–2011	77	27	38	12	17	29	24	+9	15	6	14	20	6	+11
Dušan Devečka	D	Liptovský Mikuláš	2002–2003	8	0												
Radek Deyl	D	Košice	2010–	3	0												
Róbert Döme	RW	Senica	2001–2001	6	2												
Ivan Dornič	C	Bratislava	2008–2008	2	0												
Vladimír Dravecký	RW	Košice	2006–	19	4	6	0	0	0	2	–2						
Ivan Droppa	D	Liptovský Mikuláš	1993–2001	69	4	34	2	5	7	34	–2	4	0	0	0	4	–4
Marek Ďaloga	D	Zvolen	2010–	22	0	4	0	1	1	0	–1						
Ivan Ďatelinka	D	Topoľčany	2007–2008	9	0												
Miroslav Ďurák	D	Topoľčany	2003–2004	6	0												
Juraj Ďurčo	D	Trenčín	1999–2000	15	0												
Peter Fabuš	C	Ilava	2000–2008	46	7	5	0	2	2	4	+1						
Juraj Faith	C	Košice	2004–2004	3	0												
Pavol Fedor	LW			2	0												
Peter Filip	LW	Spišská Nová Ves		2	0												
Boris Flamík	D	Skalica	2004–2004	4	0												
Martin Frank	LW	Humenné	1993–1998	3	1												
Tomáš Frolo	D	Považská Bystrica	2003–2006	6	0												
Peter Frühauf	D	Prešov	2003–	20	0	4	0	1	1	2	0						
Marián Gáborík	RW	Trenčín	1999–	66	26	35	16	11	27	24	+13	13	7	5	12	10	+3
Peter Galamboš	LW	Martin	2012–	3	0												
Martin Gálik	LW	Bratislava	2006–2006	1	0												
Peter Gallo	D			2	0												
Jakub Gašparovič	RW		2013–	3	0												
Roman Gavalier	D	Poprad	1998–1999	22	1												
Dominik Graňák	D	Havířov, Czech Republic	2003–	130	6	53	3	6	9	28	+2						
Michal Grman	D	Liptovský Mikuláš	2007–2012	4	0												
Stanislav Gron	C	Bratislava	2003–2010	25	2	3	0	0	0	2	–1						
Martin Gründling	D	Holíč	2010–2010	1	0												
Juraj Halaj	C	Liptovský Mikuláš	1999–1999	5	0												
Daniel Hančák	D	Spišská Nová Ves	2006–2006	1	0												
Lukáš Handlovský	F	Banská Bystrica	2013–	2	0												
Michal Handzuš	C	Banská Bystrica	1999–	51	11	38	7	19	26	16	+7	9	4	3	7	6	+2
Marcel Hanzal	RW		2002–2003	8	1												
Tomáš Harant	D	Žilina	2002–2007	59	1	14	0	0	0	4	–1						
Richard Hartmann	F	Bratislava	2003–2003	4	1												
Marcel Haščák	RW	Poprad	2007–	39	3	10	0	1	1	4	–4						
Marek Haščák	F	Trenčín	2007–2010	5	3												
Oto Haščák	C	Martin	1993–1998	60	17	32	8	13	21	22	0	15	2	9	11	8	+3
Radoslav Hecl	D	Partizánske	1994–2002	52	1	15	0	1	1	2	+4						
Miroslav Hlinka	D	Trenčín	2000–2007	89	14	34	6	7	13	36	0						
Ján Homer	D	Dubnica	2000–2007	11	1												
Marián Horváth	F	Spišská Nová Ves	1993–1993	3	0												
Marcel Hossa	RW	Ilava	2004–	109	27	32	7	10	17	14	+7	13	0	1	1	0	–1
Marián Hossa	RW	Stará Ľubovňa	1996–	84	37	52	16	25	41	26	+12	15	12	13	25	10	+14
Marek Hovorka	F	Dubnica nad Váhom	2011–	21	1	4	0	0	0	2	–2						
Michal Hreus	C	Žilina	1996–2006	43	9	7	2	1	3	2	+2						
Milan Hruška	D	Topoľčany	2008–	11	1												
Libor Hudáček	W	Levoča	2010–	35	6	18	3	5	8	4	–1						
Michal Hudec	LW	Bratislava	2003–2008	40	9	3	1	0	1	0	0						
Stanislav Hudec	D	Nitra	2004–2008	27	0												
Martin Hujsa	LW	Skalica	2003–2006	23	4												
Richard Huna	LW	Liptovský Mikuláš	2008–2010	7	0												
Róbert Huna	C	Liptovský Mikuláš	2008–2010	5	0												
Rudolf Huna	LW	Liptovský Mikuláš	2004–2011	25	2												
Ľubomír Hurtaj	C	Topoľčany	1999–2003	55	12	8	1	2	3	2	+1						
Peter Húževka	C	Púchov	2005–2008	24	4	5	0	1	1	0	+1						
Lukáš Hvila	RW	Poprad	2008–2008	4	0												
Zdeno Chára	D	Trenčín	1998–	82	9	55	8	6	14	40	+21	13	1	4	5	8	+6
Matúš Chovan	C	Košice	2012–	2	0												
Michal Chovan	RW	Zvolen	2009–	4	1												
Tomáš Chrenko	C	Nitra	2005–2005	8	1												
Miroslav Chudý	F		1994–1994	2	0												
Miroslav Ihnačák	RW	Poprad	1993–1995	12	10	7	7	1	8	2							
Slavomír Ilavský	C		1993–1996	24	3												
Martin Ivičič	D		2002–2002	5	0												
Branislav Jánoš	LW	Trenčín	1993–2000	117	37	26	7	10	17	34		12	2	4	6	6	–2
René Jarolín	F	Skalica	2004–2006	22	5												
Stanislav Jasečko	D	Spišská Nová Ves	1993–2000	128	9	31	0	5	5	20	+2	4	0	0	0	4	+1
Tomáš Jaško	RW	Bratislava	2010–2010	1	0												
Rudolf Jendek	D	Bratislava	1998–	6	0												
Peter Junas	LW	Poprad	1999–	3	0												
Michal Juraško	D	Zvolen	2008–2008	3	0												
Milan Jurčina	D	Liptovský Mikuláš	2005–	48	3	28	3	6	9	26	+13	13	0	1	1	8	–3
Richard Kapuš	C	Bratislava	1993–2007	136	16	47	11	16	27	26	+4	10	0	3	3	4	–1
Ladislav Karabin	LW	Spišská Nová Ves	1993–2002	5	0												
Juraj Kledrowetz	D	Liptovský Mikuláš	1993–1999	50	5	6	1	3	4	2							
Peter Klepáč	D	Liptovský Mikuláš	1999–2007	12	0												
Tomáš Klíma	C		2011–2011	2	0												
Peter Klouda	C	Poprad	2002–2002	4	0												
Miroslav Kľuch	D		1998–1998	3	0												
Andrej Kmeč	RW		2005–2007	7	1												
Jaroslav Kmiť	LW	Košice	2002–2004	18	5												
Ján Kobezda	D	Ilava	1995–1995	2	0												
Peter Kocák	RW	Skalica	2007–2007	2	0												
Michal Kokavec	LW	Žilina	2010–2010	3	0												
Marek Kolba	D	Poprad	2000–2000	2	0												
Andrej Kollár	C	Topoľčany	2005–2008	26	7	12	3	2	5	12	+4						
Juraj Kolník	RW	Nitra	2003–2010	28	4	12	3	4	7	2	+3						
Ľubomír Kolník	C	Nitra	1993–1999	109	59	37	13	12	25	16	+11						

= active player

=== Goalkeepers ===
Name	Birthplace	In team	Total	World Championships			Olympic Games		
Name	Birthplace	In team	Pld	Pld	GAA	SV%	Pld	GAA	SV%
Peter Budaj	Banská Bystrica	2003–	11	7	2.81	0.913	3	2.01	0.924
Roman Čunderlík		1995–1995	2	1	7.40	0.750			
Jaromír Dragan	Liptovský Mikuláš	1993–1997	56	21			3		
Róbert Filc		2001–2001	1						
Miroslav Hála	Trenčín	2003–2007	7						
Jaroslav Halák	Bratislava	2006–	22	12	2.76	0.898	7	2.41	0.911
Peter Hamerlík	Myjava	2009–	15	2	3.23	0.897			
Eduard Hartmann	Skalica	1993–1997	41	6	0.60	0.951	6	3.29	0.861
Ivan Harvánek^{†}		1994–1994	1						
Vladimír Hiadlovský		1993–1993	3						
Július Hudáček	Spišská Nová Ves	2010–	8						
Jaroslav Janus	Prešov	2012–	9	2	3.00	0.875			
Martin Klempa	Poprad	1996–1996	1						

= active player
