= Miroslav Preisinger =

Slovak ice hockey player

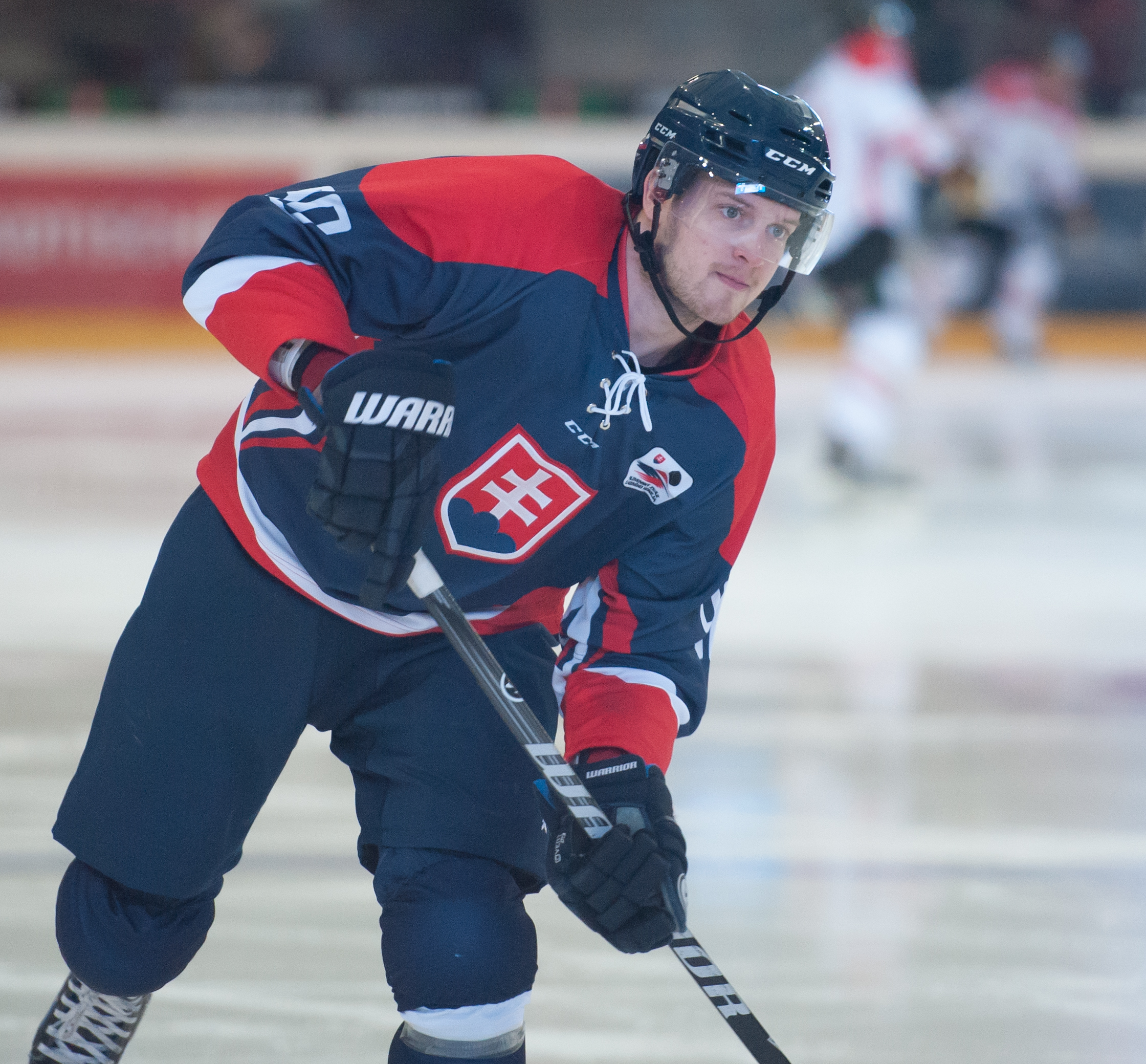
- Born: 3 February 1991 (age 35) Bratislava, Czechoslovakia
- Height: 6 ft 0 in (183 cm)
- Weight: 172 lb (78 kg; 12 st 4 lb)
- Position: Centre
- Shoots: Left
- Tipos SHL team Former teams: HC TEBS Bratislava; Sarnia Sting; HK Orange 20; HK 36 Skalica; HC '05 Banská Bystrica; HC Plzeň; HKM Zvolen; HK Poprad
- Playing career: 2010–present

Miroslav Preisinger (born 3 February 1991) is a Slovak professional ice hockey player who is currently playing for HC TEBS Bratislava of the Tipos SHL.

== Career statistics ==
Miroslav Preisinger began his ice hockey career at the HC Slovan Youth Department in his hometown of Bratislava and remained active there until 2008. Subsequently, he played for the Sarnia Sting in the Ontario Hockey League for two seasons. He was selected with the 31st overall pick in the 2008 CHL Import Draft. In the 2010-11 season, Preisinger returned to HC Slovan Bratislava and made his professional debut for the team in the Slovak Extraliga. At the same time, he also played for the Slovakia U20 national ice hockey team, which participated in Extraliga as an away team. In the 2011-12 season, he won the Slovak championship title with Slovan Bratislava.

=== Regular season and playoffs ===
| | | | Regular season | | | | | Playoffs |
| Season | Team | League | GP | G | A | Pts | PIM | GP | G | A | Pts | PIM |
|---|---|---|---|---|---|---|---|---|---|---|---|---|
| 2007–08 | HC Slovan Bratislava | Slovak-Jr. | 31 | 3 | 9 | 12 | 44 | 2 | 1 | 1 | 2 | 2 |
| 2008–09 | Sarnia Sting | OHL | 63 | 7 | 14 | 21 | 47 | 5 | 0 | 0 | 0 | 0 |
| 2009–10 | Sarnia Sting | OHL | 64 | 11 | 19 | 30 | 68 | — | — | — | — | — |
| 2010–11 | HC Slovan Bratislava | Slovak-Jr. | 2 | 1 | 1 | 2 | 4 | 1 | 0 | 1 | 1 | 0 |
| 2010–11 | HC Slovan Bratislava | Slovak | 12 | 3 | 1 | 4 | 4 | 5 | 0 | 1 | 1 | 14 |
| 2010–11 | HK Orange 20 | Slovak | 19 | 1 | 4 | 5 | 30 | — | — | — | — | — |
| 2011–12 | HC Slovan Bratislava | Slovak | 52 | 5 | 11 | 16 | 16 | 15 | 1 | 0 | 1 | 12 |
| 2012–13 | HC Slovan Bratislava | KHL | 15 | 0 | 0 | 0 | 2 | — | — | — | — | — |
| 2012–13 | HK Skalica | Slovak | 28 | 13 | 8 | 21 | 49 | — | — | — | — | — |
| 2013–14 | HK Skalica | Slovak | 53 | 6 | 19 | 25 | 36 | 6 | 1 | 1 | 2 | 0 |
| 2014–15 | HC '05 Banská Bystrica | Slovak | 53 | 4 | 22 | 26 | 55 | 5 | 0 | 1 | 1 | 2 |
| 2015–16 | HC Plzeň | Czech | 52 | 5 | 9 | 14 | 22 | 9 | 1 | 2 | 3 | 4 |
| 2016–17 | HC Plzeň | Czech | 33 | 2 | 5 | 7 | 38 | 11 | 3 | 2 | 5 | 8 |
| 2016–17 | SHC Klatovy | Czech.2 | 1 | 0 | 3 | 3 | 0 | — | — | — | — | — |
| 2017–18 | HC Plzeň | Czech | 35 | 1 | 9 | 10 | 12 | 10 | 0 | 1 | 1 | 6 |
| 2018–19 | HC Plzeň | Czech | 45 | 3 | 7 | 10 | 26 | 9 | 1 | 0 | 1 | 0 |
| 2019–20 | HKM Zvolen | Slovak | 10 | 3 | 1 | 4 | 2 | — | — | — | — | — |
| 2019–20 | HK Poprad | Slovak | 24 | 8 | 8 | 16 | 12 | — | — | — | — | — |
| 2020–21 | HK Poprad | Slovak | 42 | 2 | 14 | 16 | 24 | 15 | 0 | 3 | 3 | 16 |
| KHL totals | | | 15 | 0 | 0 | 0 | 2 | — | — | — | — | — |
| Czech totals | | | 165 | 11 | 30 | 41 | 98 | 39 | 5 | 5 | 10 | 18 |
| Slovak totals | | | 293 | 45 | 88 | 133 | 228 | 46 | 2 | 6 | 8 | 44 |

=== International ===
| Year | Team | Event | Result | GP | G | A | Pts | PIM |
|---|---|---|---|---|---|---|---|---|
| 2008 | Slovakia | WJC18 | 7th | 6 | 3 | 0 | 3 | 0 |
| 2009 | Slovakia | WJC18 | 7th | 4 | 0 | 0 | 0 | 14 |
| 2011 | Slovakia | WJC | 8th | 6 | 1 | 2 | 3 | 4 |
| Junior totals | | | | 16 | 4 | 2 | 6 | 18 |

== Awards and honors ==
| Award | Year |
Slovak
| Champion | 2012, 2022 |
