= 2021–22 Slovak Extraliga season =

- League: Slovak Extraliga
- Sport: Ice hockey
- Duration: 24 September 2021 – 13 March 2022 (regular season); 16 March – 1 May 2022 (playoffs)
- Number of games: 50
- Number of teams: 12

Regular season
- League Champion: HC Slovan Bratislava
- Top scorer: Samuel Buček (Nitra); (64 points)

Playoffs
- Playoffs MVP: Samuel Buček (Nitra)

Finals
- Champions: HC Slovan Bratislava
- Runners-up: HK Nitra

Slovak Extraliga seasons
- ← 2020–21 2022–23 →

The 2021–22 Slovak Extraliga season was the 29th season of the Slovak Extraliga, the highest ice hockey league in Slovakia.

== Team changes ==
The newly established hockey club HC 21 Prešov replaced HC 07 Detva in Tipos extraliga from this season as Prešov should be made up of Detva players. After three seasons in Slovak Extraliga, the Hungarian team DVTK Jegesmedvék left the league to participate in the Erste Liga.

HK Spišská Nová Ves won Slovak 1. Liga in the season 2020–21 in a best-of-seven playoff against Vlci Žilina. They returned to Slovak Exraliga after eleven years, the last time they played there was in the 2009–10 season.

== Regular season ==
=== Standings ===
Each team played 50 games: playing each of the other eleven teams four times – 2x at home, 2x away (44 games) and during the Christmas holidays (26.12.2021 – 9.1.2022) each team played the inserted matches within the region 1x at home, 1x away = 6 games.

Points were awarded for each game, where three points are awarded for winning in regulation time, two points for winning in overtime or shootout, one point for losing in overtime or shootout, and zero points for losing in regulation time. At the end of the regular season, the team that finished with the most points was crowned the league champion.

Pos	Team	Pld	W	OTW	OTL	L	GF	GA	GD	Pts	Qualification
1	Slovan Bratislava	50	32	3	5	10	189	118	+71	104	Qualification to Quarter-finals
2	Zvolen	50	29	5	3	13	175	135	+40	100	Qualification to Quarter-finals
3	Nitra	50	26	8	3	13	189	137	+52	97	Qualification to Quarter-finals
4	Michalovce	50	25	3	7	15	136	140	−4	88	Qualification to Quarter-finals
5	Košice	50	24	4	2	20	155	132	+23	82	Qualification to Quarter-finals
6	Poprad	50	17	7	6	20	165	161	+4	71	Qualification to Quarter-finals
7	Spišská Nová Ves	50	19	3	7	21	131	137	−6	70	Qualification to Wild card round
8	Banská Bystrica	50	18	5	5	22	142	146	−4	69	Qualification to Wild card round
9	Trenčín	50	18	4	4	24	124	138	−14	66	Qualification to Wild card round
10	Prešov	50	16	2	4	28	115	167	−52	56	Qualification to Wild card round
11	Nové Zámky	50	16	1	3	30	125	168	−43	53	
12	Liptovský Mikuláš	50	8	7	3	32	112	179	−67	41	Qualification to Play Out

Source: Tipos extraliga
Rules for classification: 1) Points; 2) Head-to-head points.

=== Statistics ===
==== Scoring leaders ====
The following shows the top ten players who led the league in points, at the conclusion of the regular season.

Player	Team	GP	G	A	Pts	+/–	PIM
(Slovakia) Samuel Buček	HK Nitra	50	41	23	64	+26	34
(Canada) Brant Harris	HC Slovan Bratislava	49	21	38	59	+21	26
(United States) William Rapuzzi	HC Slovan Bratislava	50	25	31	56	+31	12
(Slovakia) Patrik Svitana	HK Poprad	49	16	39	55	+12	16
(United States) Andrew Yogan	HC Slovan Bratislava	48	20	32	52	+26	32
(Slovakia) Marcel Haščák	HC Slovan Bratislava	32	23	27	50	+22	20
(United States) Tony Cameranesi	HK Dukla Michalovce	49	16	30	46	+3	34
(Canada) Cole Ully	HK Poprad	46	18	27	45	+11	24
(Slovakia) Michal Chovan	HC Košice	49	14	31	45	+5	24
(United States) Robby Jackson	HC Nové Zámky	50	23	21	44	−8	14

==== Leading goaltenders ====
The following shows the top ten goaltenders who led the league in goals against average, provided that they have played at least 40% of their team's minutes, at the conclusion of the regular season.

Player	Team	GP	TOI	W	L	GA	SO	Sv%	GAA
(Canada) Clint Windsor	HC Slovan Bratislava	23	1296:25	17	6	47	4	92.62	2.18
(Slovakia) Marcel Melicherčík	HK Spišská Nová Ves	38	2194:10	20	18	81	4	93.75	2.21
(Canada) Evan Weninger	HC '05 Banská Bystrica	25	1516:15	14	11	58	2	92.46	2.30
(Canada) Matt O'Connor	HK Nitra	27	1381:13	16	11	57	0	92.29	2.48
(Slovakia) Michal Valent	HK Dukla Trenčín	34	1801:21	15	19	75	2	91.50	2.50
(United States) Devin Williams	HK Dukla Michalovce	22	1303:21	13	9	56	0	91.32	2.58
(Slovakia) Andrej Košarišťan	HC Košice	35	1906:26	16	19	84	2	91.84	2.64
(Czech Republic) David Honzík	HK Nitra	30	1636:58	22	8	74	2	91.41	2.71
(Sweden) Robin Rahm	HKM Zvolen	40	2391:40	26	14	110	4	91.81	2.76
(Czech Republic) Tomáš Vošvrda	HK Dukla Michalovce	38	2161:14	14	24	106	3	90.54	2.94

== Relegation series ==
Relegation series played between MHk 32 Liptovský Mikuláš, the 12th team in regular season, and Vlci Žilina, the winner of 1. Liga. The winner of the best-of-seven series will play in the 2022–23 Slovak Extraliga.

17 April 2022; 16:00	Žilina	2–1 (1–1, 0–0, 1–0) score in the series: 1–0	Liptovský Mikuláš	Niké Aréna, Žilina; Attendance: 3,680

Game reference

Stanislav Škorvánek
Goalies
Patrik Lietava
Referees:
Juraj Konc Jr.
Peter Rojík
Linesmen:
Michal Orolin
Martin Staššák

Petráš – 03:22	1–0
	1–1	13:04 – Handlovský (Kurali)
Petran (Petráš) – 44:09 (PH2)	2–1

4 min
Penalties
4 min
19
Shots
34

18 April 2022; 16:00	Žilina	1–3 (1–1, 0–1, 0–0) score in the series: 1–1	Liptovský Mikuláš	Niké Aréna, Žilina; Attendance: 3,321

Game reference

Stanislav Škorvánek
Goalies
Patrik Lietava
Referees:
Martin Smrek
Róbert Müllner
Linesmen:
Martin Hercog
Lukáš Beniač

	0–1	02:08 – Kalousek (Cebák)
Macek (Petran, Skladaný) – 08:37	1–1
	1–2	34:32 – Mezovský
	1–3	55:25 – Hovorka (Uhrík, Cebák)

10 min
Penalties
12 min
36
Shots
34

21 April 2022; 17:00	Liptovský Mikuláš	4–1 (1–0, 1–0, 2–1) score in the series: 2–1	Žilina	Liptovský Mikuláš Ice Stadium, Liptovský Mikuláš; Attendance: 1,000

Game reference

Patrik Lietava
Goalies
Stanislav Škorvánek
Referees:
Marek Žák
Tomáš Orolin
Linesmen:
Martin Ordzovenský
Andrej Bogdaň

Walega (Ventelä) – 04:43	1–0
Shiksatdarov (Ventelä) – 28:12	2–0
Elo (Paločko, Handlovský) – 50:58	3–0
Paločko (Ventelä) – 53:13	4–0
	4–1	59:59 – Macek (Halama)

16 min
Penalties
22 min
41
Shots
15

22 April 2022; 17:00	Liptovský Mikuláš	3–2 (0–0, 1–2, 2–0) score in the series: 3–1	Žilina	Liptovský Mikuláš Ice Stadium, Liptovský Mikuláš; Attendance: 1,200

Game reference

Patrik Lietava
Tobias Klimčák
Goalies
Maroš Mikoláš
Referees:
Juraj Konc Jr.
Martin Jobbágy
Linesmen:
Adam Jurčiak
Juraj Šefčík

Handlovský (Uhrík, Pavúk) – 27:23	1–0
	1–1	31:59 – Vybiral (Skladaný) (PH1)
	1–2	34:40 – Jansons (Koyš, Markovič)
Elo (Uhrík) – 41:04	2–2
Hovorka (Ventelä, Paločko) – 44:44	3–2

22 min
Penalties
18 min
26
Shots
13

24 April 2022; 17:00	Žilina	0–4 (0–1, 0–2, 0–1) score in the series: 1–4	Liptovský Mikuláš	Niké Aréna, Žilina; Attendance: 2,236

Game reference

Maroš Mikoláš
Goalies
Patrik Lietava
Tobias Klimčák
Referees:
Vladimír Baluška
Tomáš Hronský
Linesmen:
Michal Orolin
Šimon Synek

0–1	03:03 – Kriška (Shiksatdarov)
0–2	26:25 – Kriška (Ventelä)
0–3	38:18 – Kriška (Shiksatdarov)
0–4	58:28 – Hovorka (Kriška, Handlovský)

6 min
Penalties
30 min
14
Shots
28

== Playoffs ==
Ten teams qualify for the playoffs: the top six teams in the regular season have a bye to the quarterfinals, while teams ranked seventh to tenth meet each other (7 versus 10, 8 versus 9) in a preliminary playoff round.

=== Bracket ===
Wild-card round (best-of-5)
7	Spišská Nová Ves	0
10	Prešov	3
8	Banská Bystrica	3
9	Trenčín	1

Quarter-finals (best-of-7)
1	Slovan Bratislava	4
10	Prešov	0
4	Michalovce	2
5	Košice	4
2	Zvolen	4
8	Banská Bystrica	1
3	Nitra	4
6	Poprad	3

Semi-finals (best-of-7)
1	Slovan Bratislava	4
5	Košice	3
(Pairings are re-seeded after the first and second round)
2	Zvolen	2
3	Nitra	4

Finals (best-of-7)
1	Slovan Bratislava	4
3	Nitra	2

=== Wild card round ===
Spišská Nová Ves – Prešov 0–3
16.3.2022	Spišská Nová Ves	Prešov	0-3
17.3.2022	Spišská Nová Ves	Prešov	3-4 OT
19.3.2022	Prešov	Spišská Nová Ves	3-2
Prešov won the series 3–0.

Banská Bystrica – Trenčín 3–1
16.3.2022	Banská Bystrica	Trenčín	3-2
17.3.2022	Banská Bystrica	Trenčín	4-2
19.3.2022	Trenčín	Banská Bystrica	3-2 OT
20.3.2022	Trenčín	Banská Bystrica	1-3
Banská Bystrica won the series 3–1.

=== Quarterfinals ===
Slovan Bratislava – Prešov 4–0
25.3.2022	Slovan Bratislava	Prešov	6-2
26.3.2022	Slovan Bratislava	Prešov	2-1
29.3.2022	Prešov	Slovan Bratislava	2-3 OT
30.3.2022	Prešov	Slovan Bratislava	0-2
Slovan Bratislava won the series 4–0.

Nitra – Poprad 4–3
23.3.2022	Nitra	Poprad	0-4
24.3.2022	Nitra	Poprad	7-1
27.3.2022	Poprad	Nitra	4-6
28.3.2022	Poprad	Nitra	4-2
31.3.2022	Nitra	Poprad	3-4
2.4.2022	Poprad	Nitra	1-5
4.4.2022	Nitra	Poprad	3-1
Nitra won the series 4–3.

Zvolen – Banská Bystrica 4–1
25.3.2022	Zvolen	Banská Bystrica	5-1
26.3.2022	Zvolen	Banská Bystrica	1-2
29.3.2022	Banská Bystrica	Zvolen	1-2
30.3.2022	Banská Bystrica	Zvolen	2-6
1.4.2022	Zvolen	Banská Bystrica	3-2 OT
Zvolen won the series 4–1.

Michalovce – Košice 2–4
23.3.2022	Michalovce	Košice	1-4
24.3.2022	Michalovce	Košice	1-3
27.3.2022	Košice	Michalovce	2-1 OT
28.3.2022	Košice	Michalovce	2-6
31.3.2022	Michalovce	Košice	4-1
2.4.2022	Košice	Michalovce	2-1 OT
Košice won the series 4–2.

=== Semifinals ===
Slovan Bratislava – Košice 4–3
7.4.2022	Slovan Bratislava	Košice	5-2
8.4.2022	Slovan Bratislava	Košice	6-2
11.4.2022	Košice	Slovan Bratislava	3-1
12.4.2022	Košice	Slovan Bratislava	3-1
15.4.2022	Slovan Bratislava	Košice	3-2
17.4.2022	Košice	Slovan Bratislava	4-2
19.4.2022	Slovan Bratislava	Košice	3-2 OT
Slovan Bratislava won the series 4–3.

Zvolen – Nitra 2–4
9.4.2022	Zvolen	Nitra	2-3
10.4.2022	Zvolen	Nitra	6-5
13.4.2022	Nitra	Zvolen	3-2
14.4.2022	Nitra	Zvolen	2-3
16.4.2022	Zvolen	Nitra	2-5
18.4.2022	Nitra	Zvolen	2-1
Nitra won the series 4–2.

=== Finals ===
22 April 2022; 18:30	Slovan Bratislava	6–4 (2–1, 3–1, 1–2) score in the series: 1–0	Nitra	Ondrej Nepela Arena, Bratislava; Attendance: 10,016

Game reference

Anthony Peters
Goalies
David Honzík
Matthew O'Connor
Referees:
Vladimír Snášel Jr.
Miroslav Štefik
Linesmen:
Matúš Stanzel
Ľudovít Šoltés

	0–1	05:42 – Buncis (Krivošík, Mezei)
Yogan (Chalupa) – 11:22	1–1
Harris (Jääskeläinen, Gachulinec) – 13:04	2–1
MacKenzie (Kytnár, Gachulinec) – 20:47	3–1
	3–2	24:37 – Rockwood (Švarný, Holešinský)
Yogan (Gachulinec, Kytnár) – 26:52	4–2
Haščák (Zigo) – 38:22	5–2
	5–3	40:18 – Buček (Buncis, Krivošík)
	5–4	47:42 – Buček (Nemec, Rockwood) (PP1)
Takáč (Valach, Breton) (EN) – 58:54	6–4

4 min
Penalties
0 min
31
Shots
23

23 April 2022; 18:30	Slovan Bratislava	1–2 OT (0–0, 0–0, 1–1) (OT: 0–1) score in the series: 1–1	Nitra	Ondrej Nepela Arena, Bratislava; Attendance: 10,016

Game reference

Clint Windsor
Goalies
David Honzík
Referees:
Milan Novák
Martin Korba
Linesmen:
Tomáš Gegáň
Andrej Bogdaň

	0–1	51:16 – Buncis (Buček, Nemec)
Jääskeläinen (MacKenzie, Takáč) – 59:47	1–1
	1–2	71:23 – Raskob (Hrnka, Krivošík)

6 min
Penalties
12 min
36
Shots
24

26 April 2022; 18:30	Nitra	2–6 (0–2, 1–4, 1–0) score in the series: 1–2	Slovan Bratislava	Nitra Aréna, Nitra; Attendance: 3,600

Game reference

David Honzík
Matthew O'Connor
Goalies
Clint Windsor
Referees:
Peter Stano
Miroslav Štefik
Linesmen:
Oto Durmis
Lukáš Kacej

	0–1	12:35 – Haščák (MacKenzie, Takáč) (PP1)
	0–2	16:39 – Gašpar
	0–3	22:47 – Bezák (Belluš, Sersen)
	0–4	25:05 – MacKenzie (Harris) (PP1)
	0–5	27:33 – Rapuzzi (MacKenzie, Takáč)
Varga (Baláž, Švarný) – 37:37	1–5
	1–6	38:04 – Haščák (Yogan, Rapuzzi)
Rockwood (Buček, Nemec) – 51:49	2–6

6 min
Penalties
12 min
18
Shots
28

27 April 2022; 18:30	Nitra	4–1 (1–0, 2–0, 1–1) score in the series: 2–2	Slovan Bratislava	Nitra Aréna, Nitra; Attendance: 3,600

Game reference

David Honzík
Matthew O'Connor
Goalies
Clint Windsor
Referees:
Peter Stano
Martin Korba
Linesmen:
Matúš Stanzel
Andrej Bogdaň

Hrnka (Holešinský, Bajtek) (PP1) – 01:24	1–0
Hrnka (Raskob, Baláž) – 25:06	2–0
Buček (Baláž, Nemec) – 39:12	3–0
Buncis (Buček, Nemec) – 41:05	4–0
	4–1	55:07 - Takáč (Sersen)

31 min
Penalties
48 min
22
Shots
20

29 April 2022; 18:30	Slovan Bratislava	3–1 (0–0, 2–1, 1–0) score in the series: 3–2	Nitra	Ondrej Nepela Arena, Bratislava; Attendance: 10,016

Game reference

Anthony Peters
Goalies
David Honzík
Referees:
Peter Stano
Miroslav Štefik
Linesmen:
Oto Durmis
Tomáš Gegáň

Yogan (Rapuzzi, Haščák) – 21:41	1–0
Lukošik (Kytnár, Sukeľ) – 26:53	2–0
	2–1	39:02 – Mezei (Buček, Buncis)
Harris (Rapuzzi, Haščák) (PP1) – 47:57	3–1

8 min
Penalties
33 min
38
Shots
20

1 May 2022; 18:30	Nitra	2–5 (0–0, 1–1, 1–4) score in the series: 2–4	Slovan Bratislava	Nitra Aréna, Nitra; Attendance: 3,600

Game reference

David Honzík
Goalies
Anthony Peters
Referees:
Martin Korba
Miroslav Štefik
Linesmen:
Oto Durmis
Lukáš Kacej

	0–1	29:02 – Takáč (Harris)
Mezei (Varga, Nemec) – 37:28	1–1
	1–2	44:03 – Haščák (Gachulinec)
Nemec (Mezei) (PP1) – 44:22	2–2
	2–3	45:13 – Golian (Jääskeläinen, Takáč)
	2–4	58:03 – Kytnár (Takáč, Sersen)
	2–5	59:15 – Takáč (Harris, Sersen)

4 min
Penalties
4 min
36
Shots
32

== Final rankings ==
Gold medal	Slovan Bratislava
Silver medal	Nitra
Bronze medal	Zvolen
4	Košice
5	Michalovce
6	Poprad
7	Banská Bystrica
8	Prešov
9	Spišská Nová Ves
10	Trenčín
11	Nové Zámky
12	Liptovský Mikuláš

2021–22 Slovak Extraliga season winners
(Slovakia)
HC Slovan Bratislava
9th title
