= Barinka =

Barinka is a surname. Notable people with the surname include:

- Michal Barinka (born 1984), Czech ice hockey player
- Peter Barinka (born 1977), Slovak ice hockey player
