= Samuel Buček =

Slovak ice hockey player

- Born: 19 December 1998 (age 27) Nitra, Slovakia
- Height: 6 ft 3 in (191 cm)
- Weight: 192 lb (87 kg; 13 st 10 lb)
- Position: Right wing
- Shoots: Right
- Slovak Extraliga team Former teams: HC Slovan Bratislava; KooKoo; HK Nitra; Neftekhimik Nizhnekamsk; HC Oceláři Třinec
- National team: Slovakia
- NHL draft: Undrafted
- Playing career: 2017–present

Samuel Buček (born 19 December 1998) is a Slovak professional ice hockey forward who is currently playing for HC Slovan Bratislava of the Slovak Extraliga.

== Playing career ==
Undrafted, Buček made his professional debut playing in the Tipsport liga (Slovak) with HK Nitra during the 2015–16 season.

Buček made 5 appearances in the Finnish Liiga, with KooKoo before returning to Nitra during the 2019–20 season. He moved to fellow Slovakian club, HC Slovan Bratislava during the following 2020–21 season, collecting 11 points through just 14 games.

As a free agent, Buček opted to pursue a career in North America. On 11 July 2022, he became the first player in franchise history to be signed by the Coachella Valley Firebirds of the American Hockey League (AHL). He was signed to a one-year contract for the Firebirds inaugural season in 2022–23, serving as the primary affiliate to the Seattle Kraken of the National Hockey League (NHL). Before joining the Firebirds, on 8 August 2022, Buček signed a one-year contract with Neftekhimik Nizhnekamsk of the KHL, opting to pursue a career in Russia instead. He only played six games for Nizhnekamsk before signing for Czech side HC Oceláři Třinec in October 2022. He ended up playing the 2022–23 season in the Czech Extraliga, featuring in 36 regular-season games as well as 8 times in the play-offs as Třinec won the title. He left the club after the end of the season.

== Career statistics ==
=== Regular season and playoffs ===
Bold indicates led league

			Regular season					Playoffs
Season	Team	League	GP	G	A	Pts	PIM	GP	G	A	Pts	PIM
2014–15	HK Nitra	SVK-Jr	4	2	3	5	0	8	0	3	3	10
2015–16	HK Nitra	SVK-Jr	10	8	7	15	14	—	—	—	—	—
2015–16	HK Nitra	SVK	26	1	4	5	4	—	—	—	—	—
2015–16	Chicago Steel	USHL	18	4	6	10	24	—	—	—	—	—
2016–17	Shawinigan Cataractes	QMJHL	52	12	21	33	26	4	0	1	1	0
2017–18	Chicago Steel	USHL	49	20	24	44	48	5	3	4	7	2
2018–19	HK Nitra	SVK	53	30	21	51	20	18	**9**	5	14	4
2019–20	KooKoo	FIN	5	0	1	1	0	—	—	—	—	—
2019–20	HK Nitra	SVK	42	15	12	27	36	—	—	—	—	—
2020–21	HC Slovan Bratislava	SVK	14	5	6	11	4	4	0	2	2	8
2021–22	HK Nitra	SVK	50	**41**	23	**64**	34	19	**13**	11	**24**	18
2022–23	Neftekhimik Nizhnekamsk	KHL	6	0	0	0	0	—	—	—	—	—
2022–23	HC Oceláři Třinec	CZE	36	7	3	10	4	8	0	0	0	0
SVK totals			185	92	66	158	98	41	22	18	40	30

=== International ===
Year	Team	Event	GP	G	A	Pts	PIM
2014	Slovakia	U17	5	0	1	1	0
2015	Slovakia	IH18	4	2	2	4	2
2016	Slovakia	U18	5	4	1	5	12
2018	Slovakia	WJC	5	3	4	7	0
Junior totals			19	9	8	17	14

== Awards and honours ==
Award	Year
Slovak Extraliga
Playoffs MVP	2019, 2022
