= Andrew Yogan =

American professional ice hockey player (born 1991)

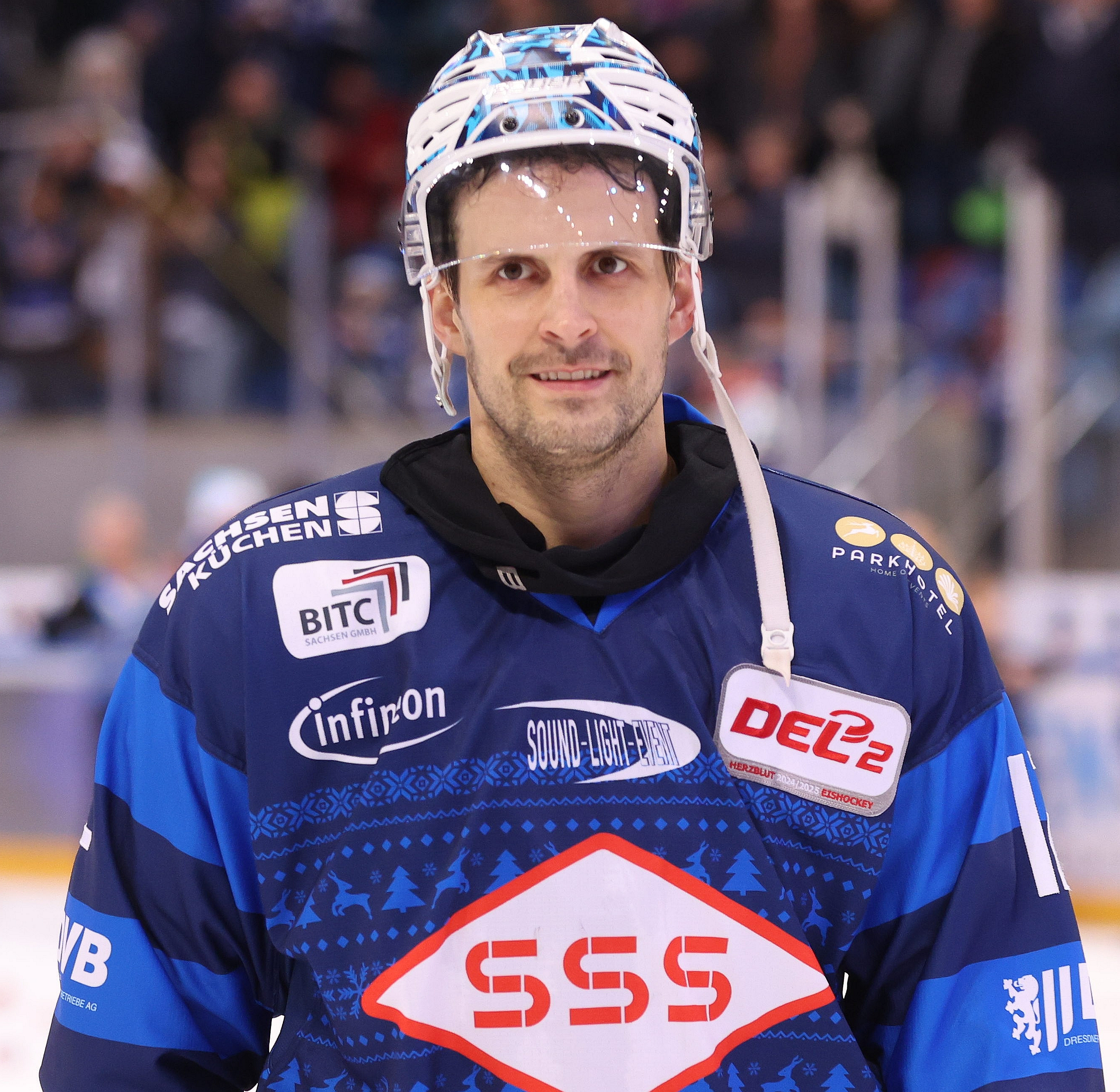
- Yogan with the Dresdner Eislöwen in 2024
- Born: December 4, 1991 (age 34) Coconut Creek, Florida, U.S.
- Height: 6 ft 3 in (191 cm)
- Weight: 203 lb (92 kg; 14 st 7 lb)
- Position: Center
- Shoots: Left
- DEL2 team Former teams: Eisbären Regensburg; Hartford Wolf Pack; San Antonio Rampage; Iowa Wild; Syracuse Crunch; St. John's IceCaps; HC Bolzano; HC TWK Innsbruck; Fehérvár AV19; Dornbirn Bulldogs; HC Slovan Bratislava; HK Poprad; Graz99ers
- NHL draft: 100th overall, 2010; New York Rangers
- Playing career: 2011–present

Andrew Yogan (born December 4, 1991) is an American professional ice hockey player currently playing for Eisbären Regensburg of the second-tier DEL2 in Germany; he was league scoring champion for the 2023–24 season.

He was selected by the New York Rangers in the 4th round (100th overall) of the 2010 NHL entry draft. He was the first hockey player raised in Florida to be drafted by the NHL. Prior NHL players who were born in Florida, but raised elsewhere include Val James, Dallas Eakins, Dan Hinote, and Blake Geoffrion.

== Playing career ==
Yogan played major junior hockey in the Ontario Hockey League. He was originally drafted by the Windsor Spitfires in 2007 in the 5th round of the OHL draft. He had been ranked 19th in the draft but fell because teams were concerned he was not interested in joining the OHL. He joined the Erie Otters in 2008. In the 2008–09 season, prior to becoming draft eligible, he suffered a concussion which may have caused him to slip in the draft. Prior to the concussion, some analysts considered him a potential first round draft pick. In 2009-10, Yogan scored 25 goals and 30 assists for 55 points for Erie. In 2010–11, he missed all but 10 games and the playoffs due to a shoulder injury. He was traded to the Peterborough Petes in 2011.

For the 2011–12 season, Yogan was named OHL player of the week for the week of March 12–18, 2012, during which he scored four goals and four assists for eight points with a +8 plus-minus rating in his last three OHL games. For the season, Yogan finished 6th in the OHL with 41 goals and 15th in the OHL with 78 points. Yogan also believes that he made significant improvements in his defensive skills during the season.

On March 21, 2012, the Connecticut Whale signed Yogan to an American Hockey League amateur tryout agreement, and on March 26, 2012, Yogan was signed by the New York Rangers to a three-year two-way contract. He played two games for the Whale in 2011, scoring two goals and one assist. Both goals came in his pro debut on April 9, 2011.

At the time he was drafted, Yogan regarded his hands and his shot as his best assets as a hockey player, and his speed as the biggest issue he needed to develop. His lack of speed may have been the result of starting playing hockey later than most legitimate prospects.

On October 6, 2014 he was traded from the Rangers to the Florida Panthers organization along with Steven Kampfer in exchange for Joey Crabb.

On September 10, 2015, Yogan returned to continue in the ECHL in signing a one-year contract with the Cincinnati Cyclones.

After his fourth full professional year in North America, Yogan opted to pursue a European career, agreeing to a one-year contract with Italian club, HC Bolzano, who compete in the Austrian Hockey League on July 25, 2016. After 10 games with Bolzano, Yogan left to rejoin the Cincinnati Cyclones on October 18, 2016. In the 2016–17 season, Yogan continued to prove his offensive prowess in the ECHL, collecting 15 goals and 32 points in 30 games. On February 2, 2017, he returned to the EBEL to continue with HC Bolzano to fulfil his contract obligations.

== Career statistics ==
=== Regular season and playoffs ===
			Regular season					Playoffs
Season	Team	League	GP	G	A	Pts	PIM	GP	G	A	Pts	PIM
2007–08	Windsor Spitfires	OHL	50	5	2	7	32	5	0	0	0	6
2008–09	Windsor Spitfires	OHL	16	5	3	8	24	—	—	—	—	—
2008–09	Erie Otters	OHL	35	17	17	34	32	—	—	—	—	—
2009–10	Erie Otters	OHL	63	25	30	55	97	—	—	—	—	—
2010–11	Erie Otters	OHL	10	3	1	4	6	3	0	2	2	4
2010–11	Connecticut Whale	AHL	2	2	1	3	0	—	—	—	—	—
2011–12	Peterborough Petes	OHL	66	41	37	78	96	—	—	—	—	—
2011–12	Connecticut Whale	AHL	4	0	0	0	15	—	—	—	—	—
2012–13	Connecticut Whale	AHL	41	7	12	19	35	—	—	—	—	—
2012–13	Greenville Road Warriors	ECHL	15	9	3	12	14	—	—	—	—	—
2013–14	Hartford Wolf Pack	AHL	40	5	5	10	50	—	—	—	—	—
2013–14	Greenville Road Warriors	ECHL	16	7	8	15	22	—	—	—	—	—
2014–15	San Antonio Rampage	AHL	43	8	1	9	46	—	—	—	—	—
2014–15	Cincinnati Cyclones	ECHL	4	2	5	7	2	—	—	—	—	—
2015–16	Cincinnati Cyclones	ECHL	34	15	28	43	52	7	2	3	5	12
2015–16	Iowa Wild	AHL	16	1	3	4	6	—	—	—	—	—
2015–16	Syracuse Crunch	AHL	4	2	0	2	4	—	—	—	—	—
2015–16	St. John's IceCaps	AHL	15	1	4	5	8	—	—	—	—	—
2016–17	Cincinnati Cyclones	ECHL	30	15	17	32	31	—	—	—	—	—
2016–17	HC Bolzano	EBEL	14	2	7	9	8	9	3	1	4	2
2017–18	HC TWK Innsbruck	EBEL	54	25	32	57	86	6	5	1	6	12
2018–19	HC TWK Innsbruck	EBEL	52	34	27	61	46	—	—	—	—	—
2019–20	Fehérvár AV19	EBEL	48	24	28	52	38	—	—	—	—	—
2020–21	Dornbirn Bulldogs	ICEHL	45	20	28	48	30	5	1	3	4	8
2021–22	HC Slovan Bratislava	Slovak	48	20	32	52	32	17	7	3	10	33
2022–23	HK Poprad	Slovak	16	4	11	15	8	—	—	—	—	—
2022–23	EC Graz	Austria	20	13	7	20	10	2	1	0	1	0
AHL totals			167	26	25	51	164	—	—	—	—	—

== Awards and honors ==
Award	Year
Slovak
Champion	2022
