= Daniel Gachulinec =

Slovak ice hockey defenceman

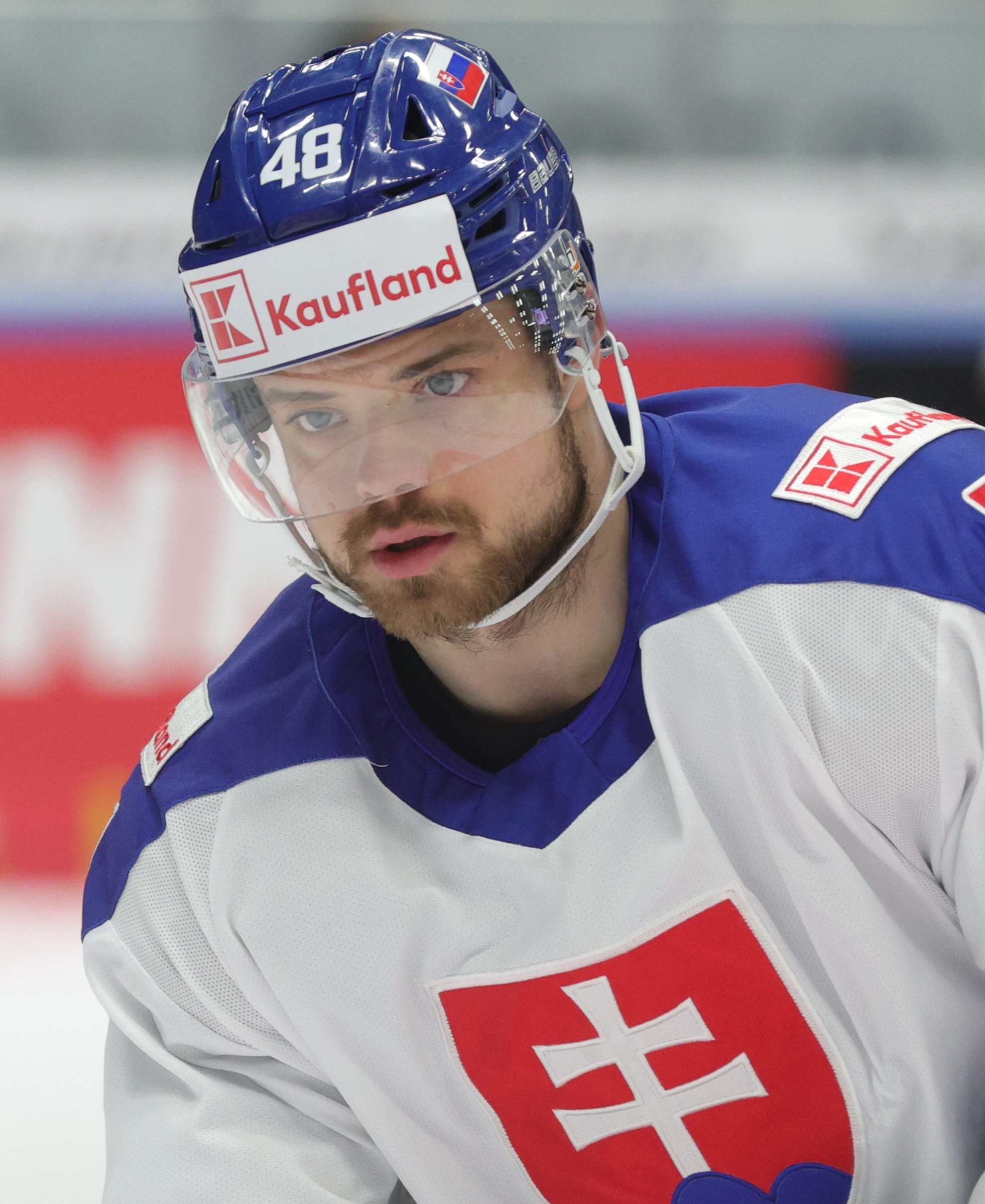
- Daniel Gachulinec, 2024
- Born: February 16, 1994 (age 31); Považská Bystrica, Slovakia
- Height: 5 ft 10 in (178 cm)
- Weight: 163 lb (74 kg; 11 st 9 lb)
- Position: Defence
- Shoots: Right
- Slovak team Former teams: Vlci Žilina; HC '05 Banská Bystrica; HK 36 Skalica; HC 07 Detva; ŠHK 37 Piešťany; HC Slovan Bratislava; HKm Zvolen
- National team: Slovakia
- Playing career: 2012–present

Daniel Gachulinec (born February 16, 1994) is a Slovak professional ice hockey defenceman currently playing for Vlci Žilina of the Slovak Extraliga.

Gachlinec previously played for HC '05 Banská Bystrica, HK 36 Skalica, ŠHK 37 Piešťany and MsHK Žilina. He played in the 2014 World Junior Ice Hockey Championships for Slovakia.

== Career statistics ==
=== International ===
Year	Team	Event	Result	GP	G	A	Pts	PIM
2021	Slovakia	WC	8th	7	0	1	1	4
Senior totals				7	0	1	1	4

== Awards and honors ==
Award	Year
Slovak
Champion	2022
