= Boris Brincko =

Slovak ice hockey player (born 1999)

- Born: 13 April 1999 (age 27) Poprad, Slovakia
- Height: 6.2 ft 0 in (189 cm)
- Weight: 83 kg (183 lb; 13 st 1 lb)
- Position: Defence
- Shoots: Left
- Slovak Extraliga team Former teams: HC Prešov; HK Poprad; Corsaires de Nantes; HK Dukla Michalovce; Nice hockey Côte d'Azur; HC 19 Humenné; AquaCity Pikes; HC Slovan Bratislava; HC TEBS Bratislava

Boris Brincko (born 13 April 1999) is a Slovak professional ice hockey defenceman currently playing for HC 21 Prešov of the Slovak Extraliga.

== Career ==
=== Early career ===
Brincko debuted as a 19-year-old in his native club of Poprad, and later played with the Slovakia men's national under-20 ice hockey team. A year later, he transferred to French club Nice hockey Côte d'Azur. He spent three years at the club, where he would make a total of 106 appearances in the league. After impressing in the reserve team of AquaCity Pikes, he joined HK Poprad in 2022. He scored his first goal for the club in a 5–1 win against HK Nitra. Brincko would establish himself in the starting lineup of Poprad, playing 92 matches in two seasons, scoring 5 goals and providing 12 assists.

=== HC Slovan Bratislava ===
In June 2024, it was announced that Brincko would be joining HC Slovan Bratislava. He played in 30 games during the 2024–25 season, in which he recorded two assists. In the +/- points rating, he was the third most successful defender at Slovan with five pluses. In 2025, Brincko signed an extension to his contract with the club.

=== Later career ===
In the 2025–26 season, Brincko played for Slovan’s reserve team HC TEBS Bratislava. On 7 January 2026, it was announced that he had joined fellow league outfit HC 21 Prešov.

== International career ==
In 2024, Brincko, alongside teammate Andrej Kukuča, were nominated for an unofficial camp of the Slovak national hockey team in preparation for the World Championship. He featured in 8 friendly matches, two against Germany and the remaining six in the Czech Republic.

== Personal life ==
Brincko has a farther, Dušan Brincko. During his career, he played for Poprad, Dubnica, Žilina, Kežmarok, Trebišov, Mlada Boleslav, Ostrava, Besançon, Mulhouse, Mont Blanc, Caen and Clermon. He is also the former assistant manager of Poprad.
