= HC TEBS Bratislava =

Slovak ice hockey club

- City: Bratislava
- League: Slovak 1. Liga
- Founded: 2010
- Home arena: Zimný Štadión Vladimíra Dzurillu (sk) (capacity: 3,500)
- Head coach: Michal Hreus
- Affiliates: HC Slovan Bratislava
- Website: https://hctebsba.sk/

HC TEBS Bratislava (formerly known as HO Hamikovo O.Z. Hamuliakovo) is an ice hockey club from Bratislava that currently plays in the TIPOS SHL, the second highest men's competition in Slovakia. The club acts as a reserve team for HC Slovan Bratislava. The club’s current manager is former HC Slovan player Michal Hreus.

== History ==
=== Founding ===
After the construction of the ice hockey hall under the name Hamikovo in Hamuliakovo, the hockey team HO Hamikovo Hamuliakovo was founded a few months later in 2011.

=== 2024–present: Recent years ===
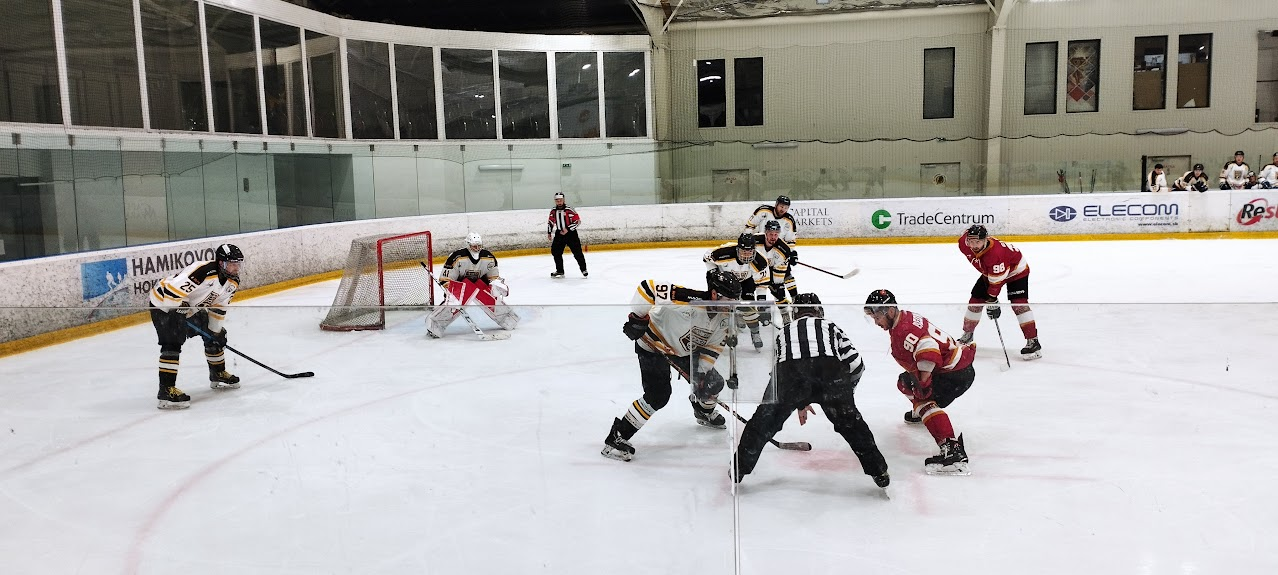
Hamuliakovo playing against Delikateso Bratislava (sk).

On 29 August 2024, Hamuliakovo became a substitute for Modré krídla Slovan, the disbanded reserve team of HC Slovan Bratislava. The club entered the second highest competition under the new name HC TEBS Bratislava. TEBS Bratislava also created a reserve team, which under the original name HO Hamikovo O.Z. Hamuliakovo plays in the 2nd league, the third highest competition. In the 2023/24 season, Bratislava got promoted back to the Slovenská hokejová liga. In the club’s first season, they managed to qualify for the promotion place offs. In 2025, ex-national team player Stanislav Gron became the oldest player to score in the 2nd league, at the age of 47 years and 1 day.

== Stadium ==
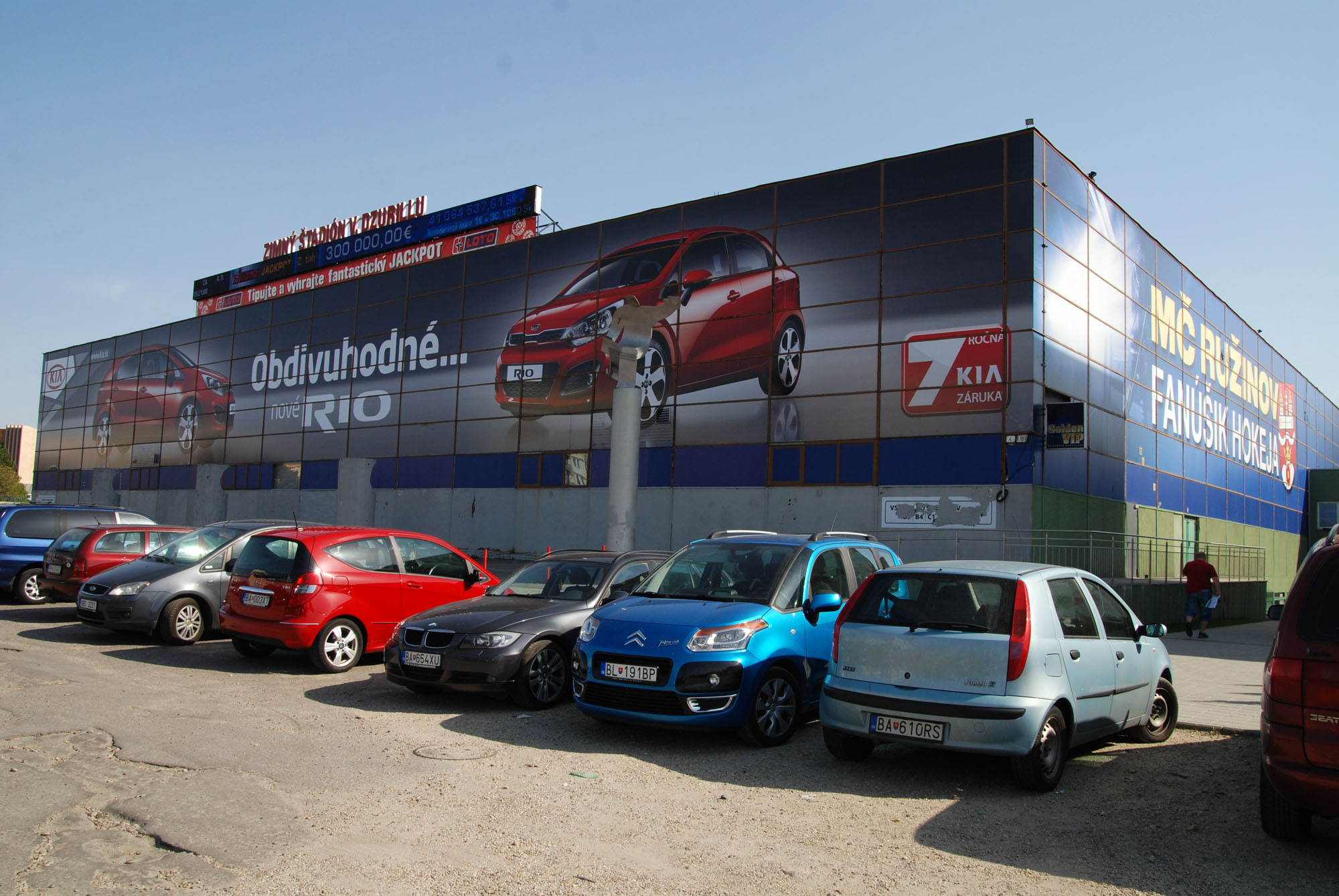
The outside of the stadium in 2011.

The Vladimír Dzurilla Ice Arena (sk) is an ice rink in Bratislava in the Ružinov district. It has a capacity of around 3,500 people. The hall is the home stand of HK Ružinov 99 Bratislava, HK Delikateso Bratislava and TEBS Bratislava. In addition to hockey, it also has the only functional curling hall in Slovakia. In 2008, the stadium was completed and officially opened a few months later on 15 May 2009.

== Notable players ==
- (Slovakia) Stanislav Gron
- (Slovakia) Boris Brincko
