= Ildar Shiksatdarov =

Russian ice hockey player

- Born: 11 July 1994 (age 31) Moscow, Russia
- Height: 5 ft 10 in (178 cm)
- Weight: 192 lb (87 kg; 13 st 10 lb)
- Position: Right wing
- Shoots: Left
- VHL team Former teams: HC Yugra; Neftekhimik Nizhnekamsk; Severstal Cherepovets; HC Vityaz; MHk 32 Liptovský Mikuláš; HC Sochi
- Playing career: 2013–present

Ildar Shiksatdarov (born 11 July 1994) is a Russian professional ice hockey forward. He is currently under contract with HC Yugra in the Supreme Hockey League (VHL).

He originally made his professional debut in the KHL and appeared in 6 seasons with HC Neftekhimik Nizhnekamsk.

== Career statistics ==
			Regular season					Playoffs
Season	Team	League	GP	G	A	Pts	PIM	GP	G	A	Pts	PIM
2021–22	MHk 32 Liptovský Mikuláš	Slovak	9	1	6	7	12	—	—	—	—	—
KHL totals			238	33	30	63	161	7	2	0	2	27
