= Michal Sersen =

Slovak ice hockey player

- Born: December 28, 1985 (age 40) Gelnica, Czechoslovakia
- Height: 6 ft 2 in (188 cm)
- Weight: 203 lb (92 kg; 14 st 7 lb)
- Position: Defence
- Shot: Left
- Played for: Avtomobilist Yekaterinburg; HC Sparta Praha; HC Lev Praha; HC '05 Banská Bystrica; HC Slovan Bratislava
- National team: Slovakia
- NHL draft: 130th overall, 2004; Pittsburgh Penguins
- Playing career: 2002–2025

Michal Sersen (born December 28, 1985) is a Slovak former professional ice hockey player who played as a defenceman. He last played for HC Slovan Bratislava of the Slovak Extraliga. Sersen was drafted by the Pittsburgh Penguins 130th overall in the 5th round of the 2004 NHL entry draft.

== Playing career ==
Sersen began his professional career with Bratislava at age 17 in 2002. During the 2002–03 season he had five goals and four assists in 33 games with the junior team before being promoted to the top-level Extraliga team. At the end of the season he entered the Quebec Major Junior Hockey League Import Draft and was selected first overall by the Rimouski Océanic, where he was teammates with the Sidney Crosby, the Penguins' first selection in 2005. In his first season, he scored 25 points in 45 games and 6 points in 9 playoff games. He played the 2005–06 season for the Quebec Remparts, scoring 79 points in 63 games, and 21 points in 23 playoff games. That season he was on the Memorial Cup All-Star team, second-team QMJHL for the regular season and the 2005–06 QMJHL Plus-Minus champion.

After failing to earn a spot on the Wilkes-Barre/Scranton Penguins roster in 2006, Sersen returned to Slovakia to again play for Bratislava. Pittsburgh traded the rights to Sersen to the Tampa Bay Lightning in October 2008.

Medal record

Ice hockey

Representing Slovakia

World Championships
Silver medal – second place	2012 Finland/Sweden	

World U18 Championships
Silver medal – second place	2003 Russia	

== Career statistics ==
=== Regular season and playoffs ===
			Regular season					Playoffs
Season	Team	League	GP	G	A	Pts	PIM	GP	G	A	Pts	PIM
2001–02	HC Slovan Bratislava	SVK U18	30	6	11	17	54	8	1	7	8	14
2001–02	HC Slovan Bratislava	SVK U20	7	1	2	3	2	1	0	0	0	0
2002–03	HC Slovan Bratislava	SVK U18	7	1	1	2	6	6	0	1	1	8
2002–03	HC Slovan Bratislava	SVK	17	0	0	0	0	—	—	—	—	—
2003–04	Rimouski Océanic	QMJHL	45	7	18	25	30	9	1	5	6	6
2004–05	Rimouski Océanic	QMJHL	67	9	33	42	74	13	0	8	8	18
2005–06	Québec Remparts	QMJHL	63	22	57	79	76	23	3	18	21	36
2006–07	HC Slovan Bratislava	SVK	42	1	4	5	28	14	0	1	1	2
2007–08	HC Slovan Bratislava	SVK	54	9	9	18	58	18	1	2	3	6
2008–09	HC Slovan Bratislava	SVK	40	4	12	16	49	—	—	—	—	—
2009–10	HC Slovan Bratislava	SVK	41	3	8	11	32	15	2	8	10	28
2010–11	Avtomobilist Yekaterinburg	KHL	51	3	8	11	48	—	—	—	—	—
2011–12	HC Sparta Praha	ELH	52	6	19	25	59	5	1	1	2	6
2012–13	HC Lev Praha	KHL	12	1	0	1	6	—	—	—	—	—
2012–13	HC Slovan Bratislava	KHL	29	1	7	8	18	4	0	1	1	4
2013–14	HC Slovan Bratislava	KHL	33	3	11	14	28	—	—	—	—	—
2014–15	HC Slovan Bratislava	KHL	59	5	17	22	79	—	—	—	—	—
2015–16	HC Slovan Bratislava	KHL	57	4	8	12	57	4	0	0	0	29
2016–17	HC Slovan Bratislava	KHL	22	1	7	8	10	—	—	—	—	—
2016–17	HC '05 iClinic Banská Bystrica	SVK	10	2	4	6	0	15	1	5	6	12
2017–18	HC Slovan Bratislava	KHL	29	4	5	9	12	—	—	—	—	—
2017–18	HC '05 iClinic Banská Bystrica	SVK	2	0	0	0	0	—	—	—	—	—
2018–19	HC Slovan Bratislava	KHL	62	4	9	13	33	—	—	—	—	—
2019–20	HC Slovan Bratislava	SVK	54	5	14	19	26	—	—	—	—	—
2020–21	HC Slovan Bratislava	SVK	43	1	15	16	32	10	0	2	2	10
2021–22	HC Slovan Bratislava	SVK	45	4	5	9	16	16	1	7	8	10
2022–23	HC Slovan Bratislava	SVK	50	1	6	7	53	6	0	2	2	0
SVK totals			398	30	77	107	294	94	5	27	32	68
KHL totals			354	26	72	98	291	8	0	1	1	33

=== International ===
Year	Team	Event	GP	G	A	Pts	PIM
2003	Slovakia	WJC18	7	0	1	1	8
2011	Slovakia	WC	1	0	0	0	0
2012	Slovakia	WC	10	0	0	0	4
2013	Slovakia	WC	8	0	2	2	6
2015	Slovakia	WC	7	1	1	2	2
2016	Slovakia	WC	4	0	1	1	2
2017	Slovakia	WC	7	0	1	1	4
Senior totals			37	1	5	6	18

== Awards and honors ==
Award	Year
Slovak
Champion	2003, 2007, 2008, 2017, 2022
Hall of Fame
HC Slovan Bratislava	2026
