= Milan Kytnár =

Slovak ice hockey player

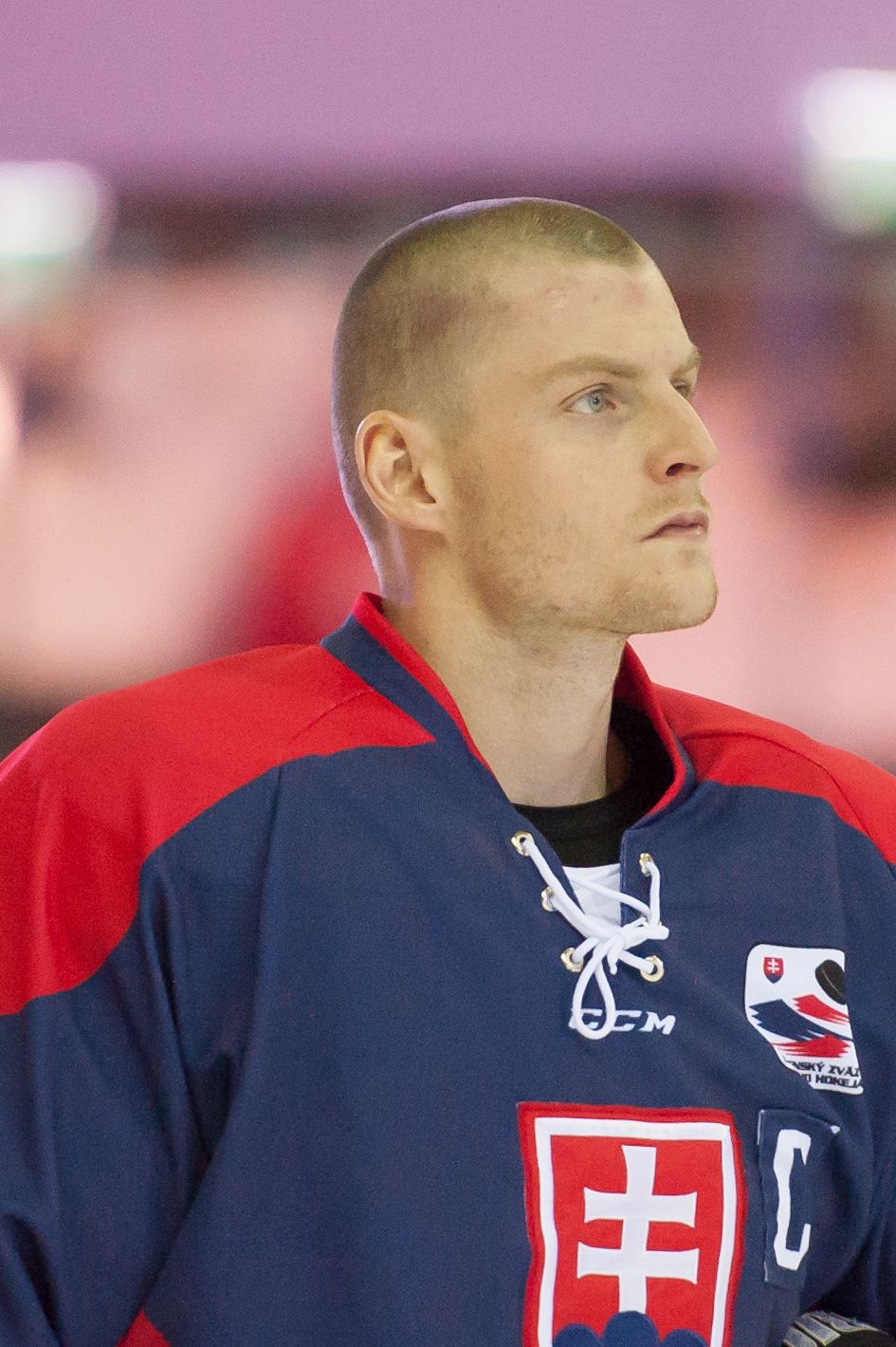
- Born: 19 May 1989 (age 37) Topoľčany, Czechoslovakia
- Height: 6 ft 0 in (183 cm)
- Weight: 183 lb (83 kg; 13 st 1 lb)
- Position: Centre
- Shoots: Left
- Ligue Magnus team Former teams: Rouen Dragons; Edmonton Oilers; HPK; HC Slovan Bratislava; HC Karlovy Vary; HC ’05 Banská Bystrica; HC Nové Zámky; HKM Zvolen
- NHL draft: 127th overall, 2007; Edmonton Oilers
- Playing career: 2007–present

Milan Kytnár (born 19 May 1989) is a Slovak professional ice hockey forward who is currently playing for Rouen Dragons of the Ligue Magnus. He was selected by the Edmonton Oilers in the 5th round (127th overall) of the 2007 NHL entry draft.

== Playing career ==
Before coming to North America, Kytnár played professionally in Slovakia with HC Topoľčany during the 2006-07 season. He moved to Canada to follow his NHL aspirations and played major junior hockey in the Western Hockey League with the Kelowna Rockets, Saskatoon Blades and the Vancouver Giants.

On May 31, 2009, the Edmonton Oilers signed Kytnár to a three-year, entry-level contract. He made his North American professional debut with the Oilers American Hockey League affiliate, the Oklahoma City Barons in the 2010-11 season, collected 13 goals and 29 points in 78 regular season games.

In the 2011–12 season, on January 11, 2012, Kytnár made his NHL debut, playing 5:31 of ice time and recording one shot on goal, with the Edmonton Oilers in a 2-1 overtime loss to the New Jersey Devils. It was his only career game in the NHL before he was returned to finish out his contract in the minor leagues and accepting a loan to return to Europe, agreeing to a stint in Finland with HPK of the Liiga.

== Career statistics ==
=== Regular season and playoffs ===
			Regular season					Playoffs
Season	Team	League	GP	G	A	Pts	PIM	GP	G	A	Pts	PIM
2003–04	HC VTJ Telvis Topoľčany	SVK U18	15	4	3	7	39	—	—	—	—	—
2003–04	HC VTJ Telvis Topoľčany	SVK.2 U18	27	13	19	32	51	—	—	—	—	—
2004–05	HC VTJ Telvis Topoľčany	SVK.2 U18	45	32	58	90	93	8	4	7	11	12
2004–05	HC VTJ Telvis Topoľčany	SVK U20	5	1	0	1	0	—	—	—	—	—
2005–06	HK Trnava	SVK U18	30	18	23	41	106	—	—	—	—	—
2005–06	HK Trnava	SVK U20	12	1	2	3	20	—	—	—	—	—
2005–06	HC VTJ Telvis Topoľčany	SVK.2 U18	6	2	5	7	66	—	—	—	—	—
2005–06	HC VTJ Telvis Topoľčany	SVK.2 U20	6	6	4	10	8	—	—	—	—	—
2006–07	HC Topoľčany	SVK U18	53	37	54	91	84	—	—	—	—	—
2006–07	HC Topoľčany	SVK.2	22	4	7	11	53	5	1	1	2	4
2007–08	Kelowna Rockets	WHL	62	9	13	22	66	7	0	0	0	4
2008–09	Saskatoon Blades	WHL	65	27	37	64	89	7	3	1	4	14
2009–10	Saskatoon Blades	WHL	3	0	1	1	2	—	—	—	—	—
2009–10	Vancouver Giants	WHL	42	14	25	39	40	16	3	12	15	23
2010–11	Oklahoma City Barons	AHL	78	13	16	29	35	1	0	0	0	0
2011–12	Oklahoma City Barons	AHL	13	1	2	3	4	—	—	—	—	—
2011–12	Stockton Thunder	ECHL	17	7	5	12	14	—	—	—	—	—
2011–12	Edmonton Oilers	NHL	1	0	0	0	0	—	—	—	—	—
2011–12	HPK	SM-liiga	16	0	3	3	12	—	—	—	—	—
2012–13	HC Slovan Bratislava	KHL	44	5	5	10	34	3	1	0	1	8
2013–14	HC Energie Karlovy Vary	ELH	41	4	6	10	22	—	—	—	—	—
2014–15	HC ’05 Banská Bystrica	SVK	53	20	18	38	46	18	2	6	8	4
2015–16	HC ’05 iClinic Banská Bystrica	SVK	55	12	17	29	32	17	2	6	8	37
2016–17	HC Nové Zámky	SVK	43	11	18	29	22	5	1	0	1	2
2017–18	HKM Zvolen	SVK	51	20	17	37	22	12	6	3	9	14
2018–19	HKM Zvolen	SVK	56	29	14	43	22	12	3	5	8	4
2019–20	HC Slovan Bratislava	SVK	43	11	16	27	26	—	—	—	—	—
2020–21	HC Slovan Bratislava	SVK	43	8	7	15	30	6	1	1	2	8
2021–22	HC Slovan Bratislava	SVK	47	5	12	17	28	16	1	5	6	14
2022–23	HC Slovan Bratislava	SVK	39	8	9	17	32	6	2	0	2	2
2023–24	Dragons de Rouen	FRA	41	8	25	33	33	6	1	4	5	2
2024–25	Dragons de Rouen	FRA	35	6	18	24	16	7	1	1	2	4
2025–26	HK Dukla Michalovce	SVK	48	3	8	11	63	11	2	1	3	4
NHL totals			1	0	0	0	0	—	—	—	—	—
Slovak totals			478	127	136	263	323	103	20	27	47	89

=== International ===
Year	Team	Event	Result	GP	G	A	Pts	PIM
2006	Slovakia	U17	9th	5	2	0	2	2
2007	Slovakia	WJC18	5th	6	2	5	7	10
2009	Slovakia	WJC	4th	7	0	6	6	4
Junior totals				18	4	11	15	16

== Awards and honors ==
Award	Year
Slovak
Champion	2022
