= Samuel Takáč =

Slovak ice hockey player (born 1991)

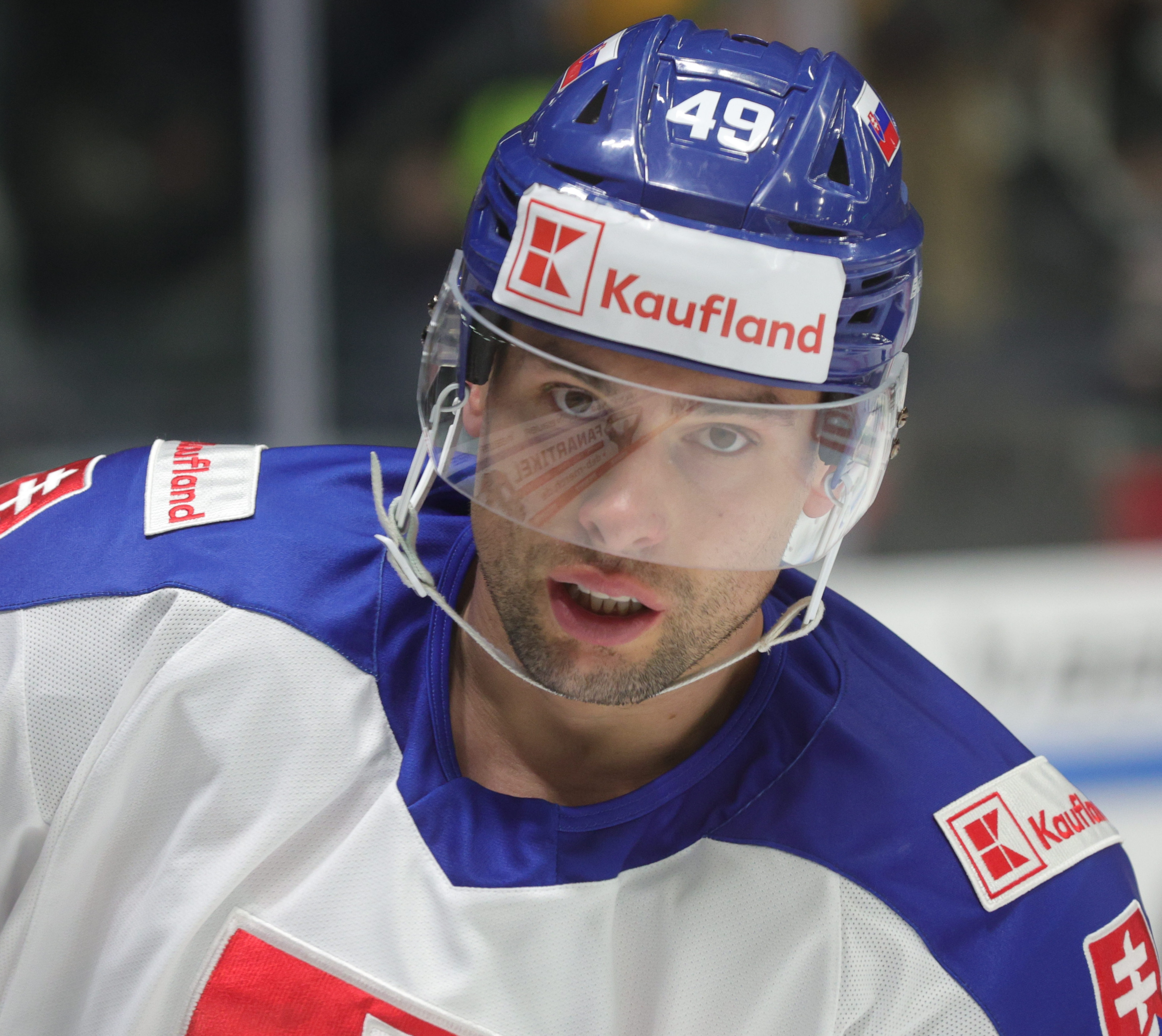
- Samuel Takáč, 2024
- Born: 3 December 1991 (age 34) Poprad, Czechoslovakia
- Height: 6 ft 0 in (183 cm)
- Weight: 203 lb (92 kg; 14 st 7 lb)
- Position: Centre
- Shoots: Left
- Slovak team Former teams: HC Slovan Bratislava; HK Poprad; HK Orange 20; HK Dukla Michalovce; Rapaces de Gap; Lyon Hockey Club
- National team: Slovakia
- NHL draft: Undrafted
- Playing career: 2009–present

Samuel Takáč (born 3 December 1991) is a Slovak professional ice hockey player who is a centre for HC Slovan Bratislava of the Slovak Extraliga.

Medal record

Men's ice hockey

Representing Slovakia

Olympic Games
Bronze medal – third place	2022 Beijing	

== Career statistics ==
=== Regular season and playoffs ===
Bold indicates led league

			Regular season					Playoffs
Season	Team	League	GP	G	A	Pts	PIM	GP	G	A	Pts	PIM
2006–07	HK Poprad	SVK U18	10	3	3	6	0	—	—	—	—	—
2007–08	HK Poprad	SVK U18	60	19	28	47	22	—	—	—	—	—
2007–08	HK Poprad	SVK U20	2	1	0	1	4	—	—	—	—	—
2008–09	HK Poprad	SVK U18	56	41	50	91	90	—	—	—	—	—
2008–09	HK Poprad	SVK U20	8	0	3	3	2	—	—	—	—	—
2009–10	HK Poprad	SVK U20	26	11	23	34	51	3	0	0	0	0
2009–10	HK Orange 20	Slovak	21	2	5	7	0	—	—	—	—	—
2010–11	HK Poprad	SVK U20	16	14	17	31	36	—	—	—	—	—
2010–11	HK Poprad	Slovak	15	2	0	2	4	8	0	0	0	2
2010–11	HK Orange 20	Slovak	18	1	0	1	4	—	—	—	—	—
2011–12	HK Poprad	SVK U20	6	1	8	9	2	3	1	1	2	2
2011–12	HK Poprad	Slovak	47	3	8	11	38	6	0	0	0	26
2012–13	HK Poprad	Slovak	56	2	13	15	53	7	2	3	5	35
2013–14	HK Poprad	Slovak	54	7	16	23	14	—	—	—	—	—
2013–14	HK Dukla Michalovce	SVK.2	—	—	—	—	—	6	2	5	7	6
2014–15	HK Poprad	Slovak	56	9	28	37	32	12	1	9	10	6
2015–16	Rapaces de Gap	FRA	22	6	9	15	6	11	3	7	10	8
2016–17	LHC Les Lions	FRA	43	24	**37**	**61**	36	5	1	3	4	4
2017–18	LHC Les Lions	FRA	42	15	25	40	58	6	5	8	13	4
2018–19	HK Poprad	Slovak	57	18	17	35	14	12	1	5	6	0
2019–20	HK Poprad	Slovak	50	16	18	34	14	—	—	—	—	—
2020–21	HK Dukla Michalovce	Slovak	46	9	20	29	28	11	2	3	5	4
2021–22	HC Slovan Bratislava	Slovak	36	13	31	44	26	17	8	11	19	12
2022–23	HC Slovan Bratislava	Slovak	47	14	29	43	12	6	0	3	3	0
2023–24	HC Slovan Bratislava	Slovak	49	17	19	36	18	4	0	1	1	0
2024–25	HC Slovan Bratislava	Slovak	51	17	30	47	18	4	0	2	2	2
2025–26	HC Slovan Bratislava	Slovak	46	16	33	49	20	16	9	3	12	29
Slovak totals			649	146	267	413	295	103	23	40	63	116

=== International ===
Year	Team	Event	Result	GP	G	A	Pts	PIM
2022	Slovakia	OG	3rd place, bronze medalist(s)	6	1	2	3	4
2022	Slovakia	WC	8th	8	3	3	6	0
2025	Slovakia	WC	11th	7	0	2	2	2
2026	Slovakia	OG	4th	6	0	0	0	0
Senior totals				27	4	7	11	6

== Awards and honors ==
Award	Year
Slovak
Champion	2022
