= Roman Gavalier =

Slovak ice hockey player

- Born: May 30, 1971 (age 53); Poprad, Czechoslovakia
- Height: 6 ft 1 in (185 cm)
- Weight: 194 lb (88 kg; 13 st 12 lb)
- Position: Defence
- Shot: Left
- Played for: HK Spišská Nová Ves; HK Aquacity ŠKP Poprad; Belfast Giants; TH Unia Oświęcim; MHK Kežmarok
- NHL draft: Undrafted
- Playing career: 1993–2010

Roman Gavalier (born May 30, 1971) is a Slovak former ice hockey defenceman.

== Career ==
Gavalier joined the Belfast Giants in 2004, joining from his hometown HK Poprad, scoring four goals and eight assists for 12 points in 55 games. After spending a year in Poland for Unia Oświęcim, Gavalier signed up to return to Belfast for the 2006–07 Elite League season. His performances throughout the season earned him the Kingdom of the Giants Most Valuable Player Award, an award won the previous season by former NHL superstar Theo Fleury. Gavalier's contract was not renewed after the 2007–08 season and Gavalier returned to Slovakia with MHK Kežmarok where he ended his playing career.
