= Marcel Haščák =

Slovak ice hockey player (born 1987)

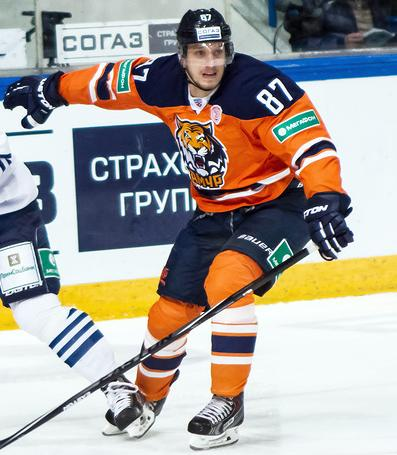
- Haščák with Amur Khabarovsk in 2014
- Born: 3 February 1987 (age 39) Poprad, Czechoslovakia
- Height: 6 ft 0 in (183 cm)
- Weight: 192 lb (87 kg; 13 st 10 lb)
- Position: Right wing
- Shoots: Right
- team Former teams: Free agent HK Poprad; HC Košice; Dinamo Riga; Amur Khabarovsk; HC Karlovy Vary; HC Kometa Brno; HC Slovan Bratislava
- National team: Slovakia
- Playing career: 2005–present

Marcel Haščák (Slovak pronunciation: [ˈmartsel ˈɦaʂtʂaːk]; born 3 February 1987) is a Slovak ice hockey player. He is currently a free agent.

Medal record

Representing Slovakia

Ice hockey

World Championships
| Silver medal – second place | 2012 Finland/Sweden | |

== Career ==
=== Slovakia ===
Haščák played junior ice hockey for his hometown club HK Poprad. He debuted at senior level in the 2005–06 season. In the 2007–08 season he earned 39 points and finished 5th in club stats. After 5 seasons for HK Poprad he signed a contract for HC Košice. He won the Slovak Extraliga title for Košice in the 2010–11 season, earning 31 points in the regular season and 4 points in the playoffs.

=== Leaving Slovakia ===
Haščák joined Dinamo Riga on try-out in August 2013. On August 21, 2013, Haščák signed one-year contract with Dinamo Riga.

=== International play ===
Haščák was a part of the silver medal winning team at the 2012 IIHF World Championship.

== Career statistics ==
=== Regular season and playoffs ===
Bold indicates led league

| | | | Regular season | | | | | Playoffs |
| Season | Team | League | GP | G | A | Pts | PIM | GP | G | A | Pts | PIM |
|---|---|---|---|---|---|---|---|---|---|---|---|---|
| 2004–05 | HK Tatravagónka ŠKP Poprad | SVK U18 | 20 | 25 | 16 | 41 | 104 | — | — | — | — | — |
| 2005–06 | HK Tatravagónka ŠKP Poprad | SVK U20 | 32 | 26 | 17 | 43 | 94 | 5 | 2 | 2 | 4 | 4 |
| 2005–06 | HK Tatravagónka ŠKP Poprad | SVK | 37 | 1 | 1 | 2 | 4 | 13 | 0 | 1 | 1 | 2 |
| 2006–07 | HK Aquacity ŠKP Poprad | SVK U20 | 16 | 10 | 14 | 24 | 64 | — | — | — | — | — |
| 2006–07 | HK Aquacity ŠKP Poprad | SVK | 43 | 11 | 7 | 18 | 50 | 6 | 2 | 2 | 4 | 4 |
| 2007–08 | HK Aquacity ŠKP Poprad | SVK U20 | 3 | 1 | 7 | 8 | 2 | — | — | — | — | — |
| 2007–08 | HK Aquacity ŠKP Poprad | SVK | 51 | 17 | 22 | 39 | 50 | 5 | 1 | 3 | 4 | 0 |
| 2008–09 | HK Aquacity ŠKP Poprad | SVK | 37 | 11 | 9 | 20 | 99 | — | — | — | — | — |
| 2009–10 | HK Aquacity ŠKP Poprad | SVK | 45 | 17 | 8 | 25 | 105 | 5 | 2 | 0 | 2 | 0 |
| 2010–11 | HC Košice | SVK | 37 | 15 | 16 | 31 | 63 | 10 | 2 | 2 | 4 | 43 |
| 2011–12 | HC Košice | SVK | 46 | 17 | 12 | 29 | 81 | 11 | 4 | 5 | 9 | 10 |
| 2011–12 | HC 46 Bardejov | Slovak.1 | 2 | 1 | 2 | 3 | 0 | — | — | — | — | — |
| 2012–13 | HC Košice | SVK | 51 | 31 | 33 | 64 | 48 | 17 | 4 | **13** | 17 | 36 |
| 2013–14 | Dinamo Rīga | KHL | 33 | 6 | 7 | 13 | 19 | 3 | 0 | 0 | 0 | 0 |
| 2014–15 | Amur Khabarovsk | KHL | 48 | 5 | 6 | 11 | 49 | — | — | — | — | — |
| 2015–16 | HC Energie Karlovy Vary | ELH | 22 | 11 | 3 | 14 | 30 | — | — | — | — | — |
| 2016–17 | HC Kometa Brno | ELH | 44 | 11 | 13 | 24 | 14 | 14 | 4 | 6 | 10 | 8 |
| 2017–18 | HC Kometa Brno | ELH | 47 | 6 | 11 | 17 | 36 | 14 | 3 | 2 | 5 | 4 |
| 2018–19 | HC Košice | SVK | 42 | 16 | 18 | 34 | 28 | 6 | 4 | 3 | 7 | 4 |
| 2019–20 | HC Košice | SVK | 45 | **33** | 22 | 55 | 36 | — | — | — | — | — |
| 2020–21 | HK Poprad | SVK | 48 | **38** | 31 | **69** | 24 | 14 | 7 | 8 | 15 | 37 |
| 2021–22 | HC Kometa Brno | ELH | 18 | 5 | 3 | 8 | 12 | — | — | — | — | — |
| 2021–22 | HC Slovan Bratislava | SVK | 32 | 23 | 27 | 50 | 20 | 16 | 6 | 5 | 11 | 4 |
| 2022–23 | HC Slovan Bratislava | SVK | 41 | 22 | 21 | 43 | 16 | 6 | 1 | 0 | 1 | 2 |
| SVK totals | | | 555 | 252 | 227 | 479 | 624 | 109 | 33 | 42 | 75 | 142 |
| ELH totals | | | 131 | 33 | 30 | 63 | 92 | 28 | 7 | 8 | 15 | 12 |

=== International ===
| Year | Team | Event | Result | GP | G | A | Pts | PIM |
|---|---|---|---|---|---|---|---|---|
| 2012 | Slovakia | WC | 2nd place, silver medalist(s) | 10 | 0 | 1 | 1 | 2 |
| 2013 | Slovakia | WC | 8th | 4 | 0 | 0 | 0 | 2 |
| 2014 | Slovakia | WC | 9th | 3 | 0 | 0 | 0 | 2 |
| 2017 | Slovakia | WC | 14th | 7 | 0 | 3 | 3 | 0 |
| 2018 | Slovakia | OG | 11th | 4 | 1 | 1 | 2 | 2 |
| 2018 | Slovakia | WC | 9th | 7 | 1 | 0 | 1 | 4 |
| Senior totals | | | | 35 | 2 | 5 | 7 | 12 |

== Awards and honors ==
| Award | Year |
Slovak
| Champion | 2011, 2022 |
Czech
| Champion | 2017, 2018 |
