= Juraj Cebák =

Slovak ice hockey player

- Born: 29 September 1982 (age 43) Prievidza, Czechoslovakia
- Height: 1.90 m (6 ft 3 in)
- Weight: 94 kg (207 lb; 14 st 11 lb)
- Position: Defence
- Shoots: Right
- team Former teams: Free agent MšHK Prievidza; MsHK Žilina; HC Vítkovice Steel; HK Nitra; MHC Martin; HK Levice; HKM Zvolen; HC 07 Detva; HC ’05 Banská Bystrica; HC Bílí Tygři Liberec; HC Košice; HK Dukla Trenčín; MHk 32 Liptovský Mikuláš; HK Spartak Dubnica
- Playing career: 1999–present

Juraj Cebák (born 29 September 1982) is a Slovak ice hockey defenceman. He is currently a free agent.

== Career statistics ==
=== Regular season and playoffs ===
			Regular season					Playoffs
Season	Team	League	GP	G	A	Pts	PIM	GP	G	A	Pts	PIM
2021–22	MHk 32 Liptovský Mikuláš	Slovak	7	0	0	0	2	—	—	—	—	—
