= Juraj Kledrowetz =

Slovak ice hockey player

- Born: July 6, 1970 (age 55) Liptovský Mikuláš, Czechoslovakia
- Height: 6 ft 0 in (183 cm)
- Weight: 192 lb (87 kg; 13 st 10 lb)
- Position: Defence
- Shot: Right
- Played for: MHk 32 Liptovský Mikuláš; HC Košice; HK SKP Poprad
- Playing career: 1993–2013

Juraj Kledrowetz (born July 6, 1970) is a Slovak former professional ice hockey defenceman.

In his career, Kledrowetz played a total of 896 games in the Slovak Extraliga where he played for MHk 32 Liptovský Mikuláš, HC Košice and HK SKP Poprad HK SKP Poprad.

== Career statistics ==
| | | | Regular season | | | | | Playoffs |
| Season | Team | League | GP | G | A | Pts | PIM | GP | G | A | Pts | PIM |
|---|---|---|---|---|---|---|---|---|---|---|---|---|
| 1992–93 | HK 32 Liptovsky Mikulas | Czechoslovak2 | — | — | — | — | — | — | — | — | — | — |
| 1993–94 | HK 32 Liptovsky Mikulas | Slovak | 32 | 5 | 7 | 12 | — | — | — | — | — | — |
| 1994–95 | HK 32 Liptovsky Mikulas | Slovak | 31 | 4 | 3 | 7 | 53 | 3 | 0 | 0 | 0 | 2 |
| 1995–936 | HC Kosice | Slovak | 44 | 10 | 2 | 12 | 24 | — | — | — | — | — |
| 1996–97 | HC Kosice | Slovak | 43 | 9 | 11 | 20 | 14 | — | — | — | — | — |
| 1997–98 | HC Kosice | Slovak | 42 | 10 | 10 | 20 | 22 | — | — | — | — | — |
| 1998–99 | HC Kosice | Slovak | 49 | 7 | 13 | 20 | 26 | — | — | — | — | — |
| 1999–00 | HC SKP Poprad | Slovak | 50 | 9 | 19 | 28 | 70 | 7 | 0 | 1 | 1 | 2 |
| 2000–01 | HC SKP Poprad | Slovak | 46 | 7 | 13 | 20 | 58 | 6 | 1 | 1 | 2 | 0 |
| 2001–02 | HC Kosice | Slovak | 52 | 8 | 19 | 27 | 90 | 9 | 2 | 4 | 6 | 8 |
| 2002–03 | HC Kosice | Slovak | 50 | 6 | 15 | 21 | 106 | 13 | 1 | 6 | 7 | 18 |
| 2003–04 | HC Kosice | Slovak | 51 | 7 | 13 | 20 | 56 | 8 | 3 | 1 | 4 | 8 |
| 2004–05 | HC Kosice | Slovak | 49 | 10 | 19 | 29 | 70 | 10 | 2 | 2 | 4 | 12 |
| 2005–06 | HC Kosice | Slovak | 48 | 9 | 15 | 24 | 66 | 6 | 0 | 2 | 2 | 6 |
| 2006–07 | HC Kosice | Slovak | 27 | 2 | 5 | 7 | 66 | 11 | 0 | 6 | 6 | 14 |
| 2007–08 | HC Kosice | Slovak | 50 | 7 | 10 | 17 | 82 | 18 | 1 | 3 | 4 | 47 |
| 2008–09 | HC Kosice | Slovak | 42 | 6 | 10 | 16 | 58 | 15 | 1 | 3 | 4 | 18 |
| 2009–10 | HC Kosice | Slovak | 28 | 4 | 7 | 11 | 78 | — | — | — | — | — |
| 2009–10 | HK Poprad | Slovak | 12 | 1 | 0 | 1 | 12 | 4 | 1 | 0 | 1 | 2 |
| 2010–11 | HK Poprad | Slovak | 33 | 2 | 7 | 9 | 20 | 7 | 1 | 0 | 1 | 2 |
| 2011–12 | HK 32 Liptovsky Mikulas | Slovak2 | 36 | 6 | 12 | 18 | 103 | 3 | 2 | 2 | 4 | 4 |
| 2012–13 | HK 32 Liptovsky Mikulas | Slovak2 | 35 | 7 | 14 | 21 | 44 | 5 | 0 | 3 | 3 | 0 |
| Slovak totals | | | 779 | 123 | 198 | 321 | 971 | 117 | 13 | 29 | 42 | 139 |
