= Stanislav Gron =

Slovak ice hockey player

- Born: October 28, 1978 (age 47) Bratislava, Czechoslovakia
- Height: 6 ft 2 in (188 cm)
- Weight: 205 lb (93 kg; 14 st 9 lb)
- Position: Right wing
- Shoots: Left
- Played for: HC Slovan Bratislava; New Jersey Devils; Albany River Rats; HC Vítkovice; HC Slavia Praha; MsHK Žilina; Füchse Duisburg; HC Košice; SG Cortina; Manchester Phoenix; HO Hamikovo; HC TEBS Bratislava
- National team: Slovakia
- NHL draft: 38th overall, 1997; New Jersey Devils
- Playing career: 1995–present

Stanislav Gron (born October 28, 1978) is a Slovak former professional ice hockey left winger. He was drafted by the New Jersey Devils in the second round, 38th overall, of the 1997 NHL entry draft. He played one game in the National Hockey League with the Devils during the 2000–01 season against the Carolina Hurricanes on February 23, 2001, being held without a point. In the game, he played 9:55 of ice time and was +1, taking 2 shots on goal.

After the 2001–02 season, he returned to Europe. He played for HC Vítkovice in the Czech league and later won the Slovak title with MsHK Žilina in the Slovak Extraliga in 2006 and with HC Košice in 2009 and 2010.

On 4 May 2009, Kosice announced that Gron, along with teammate Jaroslav Kmiť, had each signed new 3 year contracts to play in Kosice.

After playing with Kosice, he was signed by the Manchester Phoenix in July 2015.

== International play ==
Gron participated at the 2010 IIHF World Championship, playing 3 games for Slovakia.

== Career statistics ==
			Regular season					Playoffs
Season	Team	League	GP	G	A	Pts	PIM	GP	G	A	Pts	PIM
1995–96	HC Slovan Bratislava	Slovak	1	0	0	0	0	—	—	—	—	—
1996–97	HC Slovan Bratislava	Slovak	7	0	0	0	0	—	—	—	—	—
1996–97	SHK 96 Danubia Bratislava	Slovak2	3	2	0	2	0	—	—	—	—	—
1997–98	Seattle Thunderbirds	WHL	61	9	29	38	21	5	1	5	6	0
1998–99	Kootenay Ice	WHL	49	28	19	47	18	7	3	8	11	12
1998–99	Utah Grizzlies	IHL	4	0	3	3	0	—	—	—	—	—
1999–00	Albany River Rats	AHL	65	19	10	29	17	5	1	1	2	2
2000–01	New Jersey Devils	NHL	1	0	0	0	0	—	—	—	—	—
2000–01	Albany River Rats	AHL	61	16	9	25	19	—	—	—	—	—
2001–02	Albany River Rats	AHL	76	13	15	28	34	—	—	—	—	—
2002–03	HC Vitkovice	Czech	49	8	12	20	45	5	0	0	0	0
2003–04	HC Slavia Praha	Czech	5	0	0	0	2	—	—	—	—	—
2003–04	MsHK Zilina	Slovak	14	3	5	8	4	4	0	1	1	12
2004–05	MsHK Zilina	Slovak	39	11	16	27	32	—	—	—	—	—
2005–06	MsHK Zilina	Slovak	54	21	24	45	34	17	3	1	4	29
2006–07	Füchse Duisburg	DEL	23	3	5	8	24	—	—	—	—	—
2006–07	HC Kosice	Slovak	18	5	5	10	4	11	5	2	7	6
2007–08	HC Kosice	Slovak	56	13	23	36	34	18	6	9	15	14
2008–09	HC Kosice	Slovak	52	25	32	57	16	14	4	6	10	6
2009–10	HC Kosice	Slovak	43	11	18	29	24	16	5	7	12	16
2010–11	HC Kosice	Slovak	45	18	29	47	8	14	6	6	12	6
2011–12	HC Kosice	Slovak	40	10	23	33	8	16	1	4	5	20
2011–12	HC 46 Bardejov	Slovak2	1	2	0	2	0	—	—	—	—	—
2012–13	SG Cortina	Italy	39	34	30	64	45	12	3	8	11	14
2013–14	SG Cortina	Italy	40	29	38	67	22	10	8	6	14	2
2014–15	SG Cortina	Italy	30	20	24	44	20	—	—	—	—	—
NHL totals			1	0	0	0	0	—	—	—	—	—

== See also ==
- List of players who played only one game in the NHL
