= Boris Flamík =

Slovak ice hockey player

- Born: June 27, 1980 (age 45) Skalica, Czechoslovakia
- Height: 6 ft 1 in (185 cm)
- Weight: 203 lb (92 kg; 14 st 7 lb)
- Position: Defence
- Shot: Left
- Played for: HK 36 Skalica; BK Mladá Boleslav; MHC Martin
- Playing career: 1999–2017

Boris Flamík (born June 27, 1980) is a Slovak former ice hockey defenceman.

Flamík played 304 games in the Slovak Extraliga, playing for HK 36 Skalica and MHC Martin. He also played one game in the Czech Extraliga for BK Mladá Boleslav during the 2008–09 season.

== Career statistics ==
			Regular season					Playoffs
Season	Team	League	GP	G	A	Pts	PIM	GP	G	A	Pts	PIM
1999–00	HK 36 Skalica	Slovak	31	0	0	0	16	—	—	—	—	—
1999–00	HC Dukla Senica	Slovak2	1	0	0	0	0	—	—	—	—	—
2000–01	HK 36 Skalica	Slovak	45	0	1	1	20	1	0	0	0	2
2001–02	HK 36 Skalica	Slovak	54	5	14	19	42	—	—	—	—	—
2003–04	HK 36 Skalica	Slovak	51	1	9	10	32	5	0	2	2	4
2004–05	HK 36 Skalica	Slovak	45	2	9	11	42	—	—	—	—	—
2005–06	HK 36 Skalica	Slovak	46	1	6	7	30	2	0	0	0	0
2006–07	HK 36 Skalica	Slovak	16	1	1	2	6	—	—	—	—	—
2006–07	HC VČE Hradec Králové	Czech2	16	3	9	12	22	5	0	0	0	10
2007–08	Eispiraten Crimmitschau	Germany2	37	1	13	14	69	4	0	2	2	6
2008–09	BK Mlada Boleslav	Czech	1	0	0	0	0	—	—	—	—	—
2008–09	SK Horácká Slavia Třebíč	Czech2	32	3	2	5	14	—	—	—	—	—
2008–09	Lausitzer Füchse	Germany2	12	0	3	3	14	5	0	0	0	14
2009–10	SHK Hodonin	Czech3	27	7	7	14	68	9	2	6	8	35
2010–11	SHK Hodonin	Czech3	31	6	21	27	30	3	0	1	1	0
2011–12	MHC Martin	Slovak	8	0	1	1	12	—	—	—	—	—
2011–12	Blue Devils Weiden	Germany4	16	6	8	14	10	10	1	7	8	20
2012–13	Blue Devils Weiden	Germany3	38	7	29	36	34	9	0	9	9	16
2013–14	EHC Stiftland Mitterteich	Germany4	28	11	16	27	49	—	—	—	—	—
2014–15	ERSC Amberg	Germany5	24	19	30	49	—	—	—	—	—	—
2015–16	ERSC Amberg	Germany5	—	—	—	—	—	—	—	—	—	—
2016–17	ERSC Amberg	Germany5	—	—	—	—	—	—	—	—	—	—
Slovak totals			296	10	41	51	200	8	0	2	2	6
