= Marcel Petran =

Slovak ice hockey player

- Born: 16 September 1986 (age 39) Liptovský Mikuláš, TCH
- Height: 6 ft 3 in (191 cm)
- Weight: 214 lb (97 kg; 15 st 4 lb)
- Position: Defenceman
- Shoots: Left
- team Former teams: Free agent MHk 32 Liptovský Mikuláš; MHK Ružomberok; HC 07 Prešov; Újpesti TE; Basingstoke Bison; Bracknell Bees; Arlan Kokshetau; Peterborough Phantoms; Edinburgh Capitals; HC '05 Banská Bystrica; AZ Havířov; PSG Berani Zlín; HK Poprad; HKM Zvolen; HC Košice; Vlci Žilina
- Playing career: 2006–present

Marcel Petran (born 16 September 1986) is a Slovak professional ice hockey defenceman. He is currently a free agent.

Petran made his professional debut for MHk 32 Liptovský Mikuláš in 2006. He later played in the MOL Liga for Újpesti TE, the Kazakhstan Hockey Championship for Arlan Kokshetau and the Elite Ice Hockey League for the Edinburgh Capitals before returning to Slovakia on August 9, 2015, with HC '05 Banská Bystrica.

On June 24, 2016, Petran moved to the Czech Republic to sign for AZ Havířov of the WSM Liga. On October 8, 2017, Petran had a loan spell with PSG Berani Zlín of the Czech Extraliga, playing twenty games and registering one assist. He would return to Slovakia two months later to sign for HK Poprad.

Petran made a return to Liptovský Mikuláš after eight years away on July 18. 2019. He then moved to HKM Zvolen on February 10, 2020, for the remainder of the season though the season would be prematurely concluded due to the COVID-19 pandemic. He returned to Liptovský Mikuláš on August 5, 2020.

== Career statistics ==
=== Regular season and playoffs ===
			Regular season					Playoffs
Season	Team	League	GP	G	A	Pts	PIM	GP	G	A	Pts	PIM
Czech totals			20	0	1	1	22	—	—	—	—	—
Slovak totals			384	23	63	86	593	29	1	2	3	4
