= Tomáš Frolo =

Slovak ice hockey player

- Born: January 26, 1982 (age 43); Považská Bystrica, Czechoslovakia
- Height: 6 ft 2 in (188 cm)
- Weight: 196 lb (89 kg; 14 st 0 lb)
- Position: Defence
- Shot: Left
- Played for: HKm Zvolen; HC Oceláři Třinec; Motor České Budějovice; BK Mladá Boleslav; HC Plzeň; HC '05 Banská Bystrica; HC Litvínov; VHK Vsetin
- Playing career: 2001–2019

Tomáš Frolo (born January 26, 1982) is a Slovak former professional ice hockey defenceman who last played for VHK Vsetín of the Czech 1. Liga. He played with HC Plzeň in the Czech Extraliga during the 2010–11 Czech Extraliga season.

Frolo previously played for HC Vsetín, HC Oceláři Třinec, BK Mladá Boleslav and HC České Budějovice.

== Career statistics ==
| | | | Regular season | | | | | Playoffs |
| Season | Team | League | GP | G | A | Pts | PIM | GP | G | A | Pts | PIM |
|---|---|---|---|---|---|---|---|---|---|---|---|---|
| 1995–96 | HK 95 Povazska Bystrica U18 | Slovak U18 | 9 | 1 | 0 | 1 | 22 | — | — | — | — | — |
| 1996–97 | HK 95 Povazska Bystrica U18 | Slovak U18 | 51 | 1 | 3 | 4 | 187 | — | — | — | — | — |
| 1997–98 | HK 95 Povazska Bystrica U18 | Slovak U18 | 38 | 8 | 9 | 17 | 158 | — | — | — | — | — |
| 1998–99 | MHC Martin U18 | Slovak U18 | 42 | 2 | 5 | 7 | 179 | — | — | — | — | — |
| 1999–00 | HKM Zvolen U20 | Slovak U20 | 41 | 2 | 8 | 10 | 142 | — | — | — | — | — |
| 1999–00 | HKM Zvolen B | Slovak2 | 1 | 0 | 0 | 0 | 0 | — | — | — | — | — |
| 1999–00 | HKM Zvolen | Slovak | 2 | 0 | 0 | 0 | 0 | — | — | — | — | — |
| 2000–01 | HC Vsetin U20 | Czech U20 | 47 | 1 | 9 | 10 | 164 | 9 | 0 | 0 | 0 | 48 |
| 2001–02 | HC Vsetin U20 | Czech U20 | 34 | 3 | 12 | 15 | 148 | 2 | 0 | 0 | 0 | 2 |
| 2001–02 | HC Vsetin | Czech | 6 | 0 | 0 | 0 | 16 | — | — | — | — | — |
| 2001–02 | HC Sumperk | Czech2 | 12 | 0 | 0 | 0 | 28 | — | — | — | — | — |
| 2002–03 | HC Vsetin U20 | Czech U20 | 4 | 0 | 1 | 1 | 10 | — | — | — | — | — |
| 2002–03 | HC Vsetin | Czech | 49 | 3 | 3 | 6 | 95 | 4 | 0 | 0 | 0 | 12 |
| 2002–03 | HC Kladno | Czech2 | — | — | — | — | — | — | — | — | — | — |
| 2003–04 | HC Vsetin | Czech | 44 | 1 | 0 | 1 | 133 | — | — | — | — | — |
| 2003–04 | HC Prostejov | Czech2 | 1 | 0 | 0 | 0 | 4 | — | — | — | — | — |
| 2003–04 | HC Slezan Opava | Czech2 | 1 | 0 | 0 | 0 | 2 | — | — | — | — | — |
| 2003–04 | HC Sareza Ostrava | Czech3 | — | — | — | — | — | 3 | 1 | 1 | 2 | 2 |
| 2004–05 | Vsetinska hokejova | Czech | 51 | 3 | 1 | 4 | 162 | — | — | — | — | — |
| 2004–05 | HC Novy Jicin | Czech3 | 1 | 0 | 0 | 0 | 0 | 1 | 0 | 0 | 0 | 6 |
| 2005–06 | HC Ocelari Trinec | Czech | 29 | 1 | 3 | 4 | 83 | 2 | 0 | 0 | 0 | 33 |
| 2005–06 | HK Jestrabi Prostejov | Czech2 | 2 | 0 | 0 | 0 | 2 | — | — | — | — | — |
| 2006–07 | HC Ocelari Trinec | Czech | 51 | 2 | 5 | 7 | 116 | 9 | 0 | 0 | 0 | 57 |
| 2007–08 | HC Ceske Budejovice | Czech | 45 | 1 | 1 | 2 | 64 | 12 | 1 | 1 | 2 | 18 |
| 2008–09 | HC Ceske Budejovice | Czech | 42 | 2 | 8 | 10 | 54 | — | — | — | — | — |
| 2009–10 | BK Mlada Boleslav | Czech | 48 | 0 | 7 | 7 | 113 | — | — | — | — | — |
| 2010–11 | HC Plzen | Czech | 43 | 1 | 1 | 2 | 72 | 4 | 0 | 0 | 0 | 6 |
| 2010–11 | Orli Znojmo | Czech2 | 4 | 0 | 1 | 1 | 8 | — | — | — | — | — |
| 2011–12 | HC Plzen | Czech | 14 | 0 | 1 | 1 | 30 | 12 | 0 | 0 | 0 | 44 |
| 2012–13 | HC Plzen | Czech | 33 | 0 | 2 | 2 | 69 | 12 | 0 | 0 | 0 | 24 |
| 2012–13 | IHC Písek | Czech2 | 1 | 0 | 0 | 0 | 2 | — | — | — | — | — |
| 2013–14 | HC Plzen | Czech | 30 | 1 | 2 | 3 | 40 | 1 | 0 | 0 | 0 | 4 |
| 2014–15 | Saryarka Karagandy | VHL | 1 | 0 | 0 | 0 | 4 | — | — | — | — | — |
| 2014–15 | HC Banska Bystrica | Slovak | 2 | 0 | 0 | 0 | 0 | — | — | — | — | — |
| 2014–15 | HC Litvinov | Czech | 20 | 1 | 2 | 3 | 78 | 1 | 0 | 0 | 0 | 0 |
| 2015–16 | HC Litvinov | Czech | 49 | 4 | 2 | 6 | 84 | — | — | — | — | — |
| 2016–17 | HC Litvinov | Czech | 6 | 0 | 1 | 1 | 10 | 4 | 0 | 0 | 0 | 0 |
| 2016–17 | HC Most | Czech2 | 9 | 0 | 0 | 0 | 14 | — | — | — | — | — |
| 2017–18 | VHK Vsetin | Czech2 | 50 | 4 | 16 | 20 | 172 | 4 | 0 | 0 | 0 | 22 |
| 2017–18 | HC Litvinov | Czech | — | — | — | — | — | — | — | — | — | — |
| 2018–19 | VHK Vsetin | Czech2 | 39 | 3 | 11 | 14 | 114 | 12 | 0 | 1 | 1 | 22 |
| Czech totals | | | 560 | 20 | 39 | 59 | 1,219 | 89 | 1 | 1 | 2 | 263 |
| Czech2 totals | | | 119 | 7 | 28 | 35 | 346 | 19 | 1 | 2 | 3 | 44 |
