= Peter Kocák =

Slovak ice hockey player

- Born: 5 January 1982 (age 43); Skalica, Czechoslovakia
- Height: 6 ft 0 in (183 cm)
- Weight: 181 lb (82 kg; 12 st 13 lb)
- Position: Right wing
- Shot: Left
- Played for: HK 36 Skalica; HC Plzeň
- National team: Slovakia
- Playing career: 2000–2013

Peter Kocák (born 5 January 1982) is a Slovak former professional ice hockey right winger.

Kocák played a total of 357 games for HK 36 Skalica of the Slovak Extraliga over nine seasons. He also played twelve games for HC Plzeň of the Czech Extraliga during the 2005–06 season.
