= František Skladaný =

Slovak professional ice hockey player (born 1982)

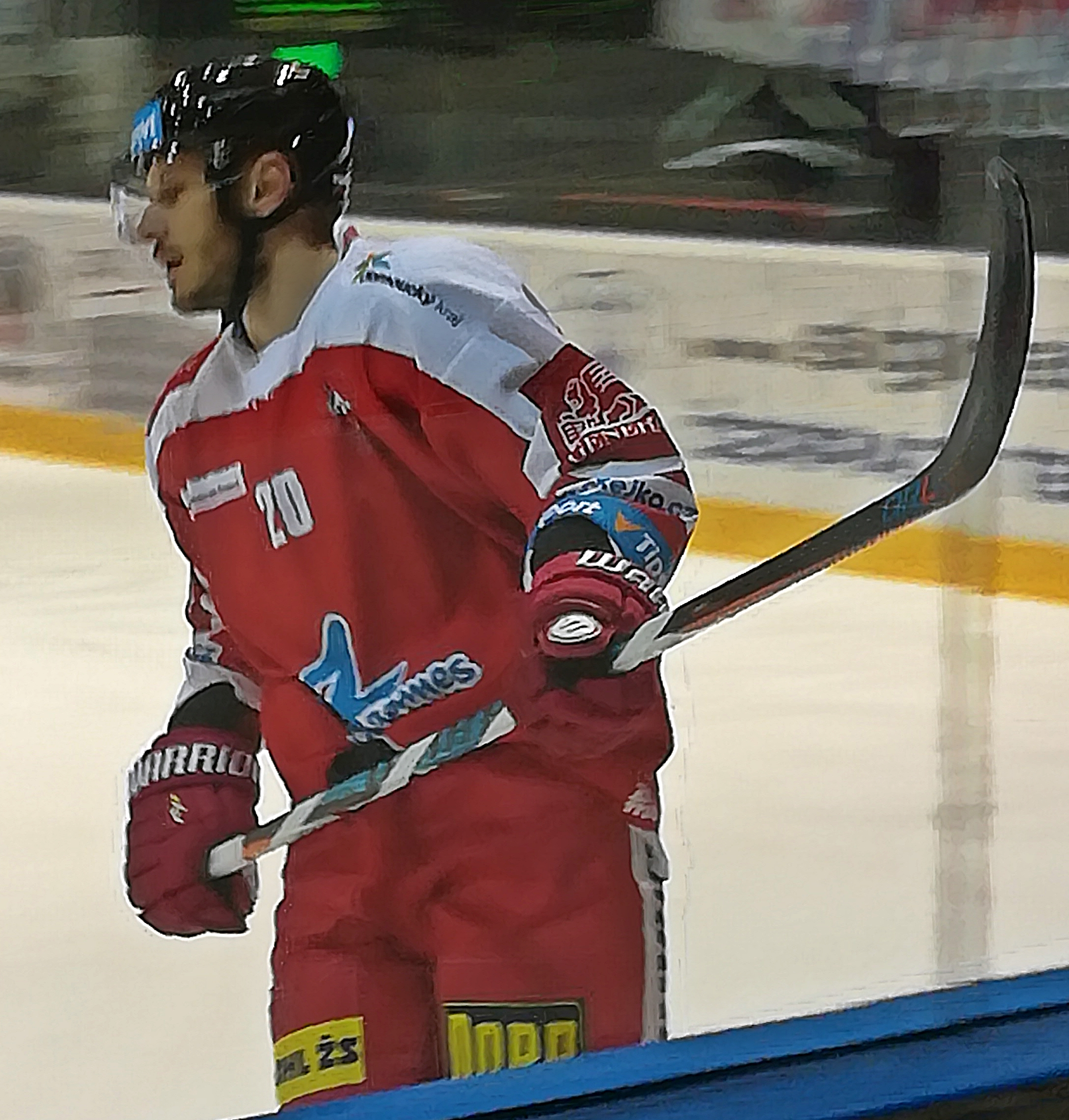
- Born: April 22, 1982 (age 44) Martin, Czechoslovakia
- Height: 5 ft 11 in (180 cm)
- Weight: 183 lb (83 kg; 13 st 1 lb)
- Position: Right wing
- Shot: Left
- Played for: MHC Martin; Hershey Bears; Lowell Lock Monsters; HC Karlovy Vary; Buran Voronezh; HK Neman Grodno; HC Olomouc
- National team: Slovakia
- NHL draft: 143rd overall, 2001; Colorado Avalanche
- Playing career: 2000–2022

František Skladaný (born April 22, 1982) is a Slovak former professional ice hockey player. He was selected by the Colorado Avalanche in the fifth-round (143rd overall) of the 2001 NHL entry draft.

Skladany has played with HC Karlovy Vary of the Czech Extraliga from the 2006–07 season. On October 20, 2012, he was signed to a one-year contract extension to remain in Karlovy until 2013.

On July 21, 2013, Skaldany signed a one-year contract as a free agent with Russian Higher Hockey League club, Buran Voronezh, an affiliate of HC Spartak Moscow.

== Career statistics ==
=== Regular season and playoffs ===
			Regular season					Playoffs
Season	Team	League	GP	G	A	Pts	PIM	GP	G	A	Pts	PIM
1995–96	Martinskeho hokeja club	SVK U20	8	2	1	3	2	—	—	—	—	—
1996–97	Martinskeho hokeja club	SVK U20	46	29	28	57	18	—	—	—	—	—
1997–98	Martinskeho hokeja club	SVK U20	53	46	37	83	18	—	—	—	—	—
1998–99	Martinskeho hokeja club	SVK U20	10	2	4	6	4	—	—	—	—	—
1998–99	Martinskeho hokeja club	SVK	1	0	0	0	0	—	—	—	—	—
1999–2000	Martinskeho hokeja club	SVK U20	3	2	3	5	0	—	—	—	—	—
1999–2000	Martinskeho hokeja club	SVK	16	3	7	10	2	—	—	—	—	—
2000–01	Boston University	HE	35	4	5	9	4	—	—	—	—	—
2001–02	Boston University	HE	33	13	13	26	23	—	—	—	—	—
2002–03	Boston University	HE	41	14	21	35	34	—	—	—	—	—
2003–04	Boston University	HE	37	3	21	24	16	—	—	—	—	—
2003–04	Hershey Bears	AHL	5	0	0	0	0	—	—	—	—	—
2004–05	Hershey Bears	AHL	15	0	0	0	2	—	—	—	—	—
2004–05	Quad City Mallards	UHL	50	9	11	20	33	7	1	1	2	4
2005–06	San Diego Gulls	ECHL	9	2	3	5	6	—	—	—	—	—
2005–06	Lowell Lock Monsters	AHL	52	1	10	11	28	—	—	—	—	—
2006–07	HC Energie Karlovy Vary	ELH	52	11	12	23	34	3	1	0	1	14
2007–08	HC Energie Karlovy Vary	ELH	52	9	8	17	24	17	1	2	3	16
2008–09	HC Energie Karlovy Vary	ELH	52	5	16	21	20	16	8	3	11	12
2009–10	HC Energie Karlovy Vary	ELH	35	6	6	12	16	—	—	—	—	—
2009–10	KLH Chomutov	CZE.2	2	0	1	1	0	—	—	—	—	—
2010–11	HC Energie Karlovy Vary	ELH	51	12	15	27	16	5	2	0	2	0
2011–12	HC Energie Karlovy Vary	ELH	45	6	17	23	16	—	—	—	—	—
2012–13	HC Energie Karlovy Vary	ELH	52	7	8	15	18	—	—	—	—	—
2013–14	Buran Voronezh	VHL	48	10	10	20	22	11	2	2	4	2
2014–15	Buran Voronezh	VHL	50	16	13	29	16	6	0	2	2	2
2015–16	Neman Grodno	BLR	3	2	1	3	0	—	—	—	—	—
2015–16	MHC Mountfield Martin	SVK	31	12	12	24	4	—	—	—	—	—
2015–16	HC Olomouc	ELH	15	0	2	2	6	5	0	0	0	0
2016–17	HC Olomouc	ELH	44	11	15	26	22	—	—	—	—	—
2017–18	HC Olomouc	ELH	41	8	6	14	16	9	0	1	1	4
2018–19	HC Olomouc	ELH	51	2	7	9	16	7	1	0	1	0
2019–20	HC Olomouc	ELH	45	5	4	9	30	2	1	0	1	0
2020–21	Vlci Žilina	SVK.2	24	4	14	18	39	13	4	7	11	29
2021–22	Vlci Žilina	SVK.2	32	7	14	21	14	15	0	3	3	12
ELH totals			535	82	116	198	234	64	14	6	20	46

=== International ===
Year	Team	Event	Result	GP	G	A	Pts	PIM
2000	Slovakia	WJC18	5th	6	1	1	2	2
2002	Slovakia	WJC	8th	7	0	0	0	4
2008	Slovakia	WC	13th	5	0	1	1	4
Junior totals				13	1	1	2	6
Senior totals				5	0	1	1	4
