= Michal Hreus =

Slovak ice hockey player

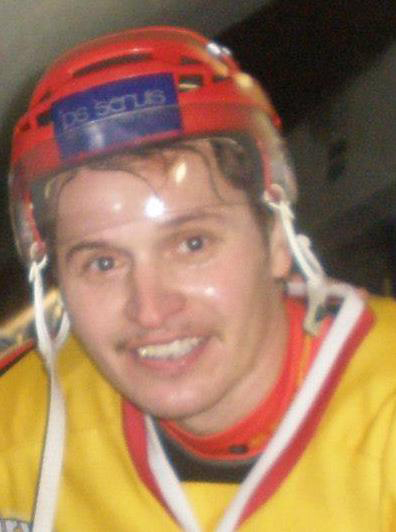
- Born: March 9, 1973 Žilina, Czechoslovakia
- Height: 6 ft 2 in (188 cm)
- Weight: 205 lb (93 kg; 14 st 9 lb)
- Position: Centre
- Shoots: Left
- Slovak Extraliga team: HC Slovan Bratislava
- National team: Slovakia
- NHL draft: Undrafted
- Playing career: 1990–present

Michal Hreus (born March 9, 1973) is a Slovak professional ice hockey player. He played most matches with HC Slovan Bratislava in the Slovak Extraliga.

As a junior, he played for Sparta Prague. He was also an active player in a few German teams (Mannheim and Krefeld). He returned to Slovakia in 1998/99 and played in the Slovak Extraliga in Skalica. In the following year he won a championship with the Slovan Bratislava club, where he played 1999 - 2002. During this period he also transferred to the Finnish Rauma Lukko. After playing for the Czech team Litvinov he returned to his home town and started a successful career path at Mshk Žilina. Hreus was one of the team's key players to gain the championship debut. His former club Slovan Bratislava expressed an interest in Hreus and Mshk Žilina released him until 30 April (along with defender Dalibor Kusovský). During this time Hreus won his third championship.

== Awards ==
- 1999/00 HC Slovan Bratislava
- 2005/06 MsHK Žilina
- 2006/07 HC Slovan Bratislava
- 2007/08 HC Slovan Bratislava

== Career statistics ==
| | | | Regular Season | | | | | | Playoffs |
| Season | Club | League | GP | G | A | Pts | TM | +/- | GP | G | A | Pts | TM | +/- |
|---|---|---|---|---|---|---|---|---|---|---|---|---|---|---|
| 1990/1991 | Sparta Prague | ČSHL | 11 | 1 | 0 | 1 | 4 |
| 1994/1995 | Mad Dogs Munich | DEL | 27 | 7 | 5 | 12 | 12 |
| 1994/1995 | Adler Mannheim | DEL | 14 | 7 | 7 | 14 | 0 | | 10 | 1 | 5 | 6 | 12 |
| 1995/1996 | Adler Mannheim | DEL | 50 | 17 | 13 | 30 | 40 | | 3 | 0 | 0 | 0 | 4 |
| 1996/1997 | Krefeld Pinguine | DEL | 48 | 14 | 11 | 25 | 24 |
| 1997/1998 | Krefeld Pinguine | DEL | 39 | 5 | 5 | 10 | 20 | +2 |
| 1998/1999 | HK 36 Skalica | SE | 42 | 13 | 16 | 29 | 58 | +7 | 6 | 1 | 4 | 5 | 0 | 0 |
| 1999/2000 | Slovan Bratislava | SE | 51 | 9 | 40 | 49 | 22 | +31 | 8 | 5 | 1 | 6 | 0 | +8 |
| 2000/2001 | Slovan Bratislava | SE | 40 | 10 | 18 | 28 | 36 | +16 | 8 | 8 | 8 | 16 | 2 | +6 |
| 2001/2002 | Slovan Bratislava | SE | 27 | 8 | 8 | 16 | 8 | +6 |
| 2001/2002 | Lukko Rauma | SM-liiga | 23 | 2 | 5 | 7 | 22 | -6 |
| 2002/2003 | MsHK Žilina | SE | 39 | 6 | 20 | 26 | 53 | | 4 | 1 | 3 | 4 | 2 |
| 2003/2004 | MsHK Žilina | SE | 26 | 8 | 12 | 20 | 14 | +11 |
| 2003/2004 | HC Litvínov | ČE | 23 | 4 | 7 | 11 | 6 | -1 |
| 2004/2005 | HC Litvínov | ČE | 17 | 1 | 1 | 2 | 6 | -1 |
| 2004/2005 | MsHK Žilina | SE | 32 | 9 | 12 | 21 | 50 | +9 | 5 | 2 | 1 | 3 | 8 | 0 |
| 2005/2006 | MsHK Žilina | SE | 53 | 10 | 16 | 26 | 38 | +13 | 17 | 7 | 8 | 15 | 10 | +11 |
| 2006/2007 | MsHK Žilina | SE | 40 | 8 | 15 | 23 | 58 | -6 |
| 2006/2007 | Slovan Bratislava | SE | 13 | 3 | 8 | 11 | 16 | +6 | 14 | 3 | 5 | 8 | +8 | 14 |
| 2007/2008 | Slovan Bratislava | SE | 53 | 11 | 32 | 43 | 32 | +40 | 18 | 6 | 6 | 12 | +9 | 30 |
