= Peter Barinka =

Slovak ice hockey player

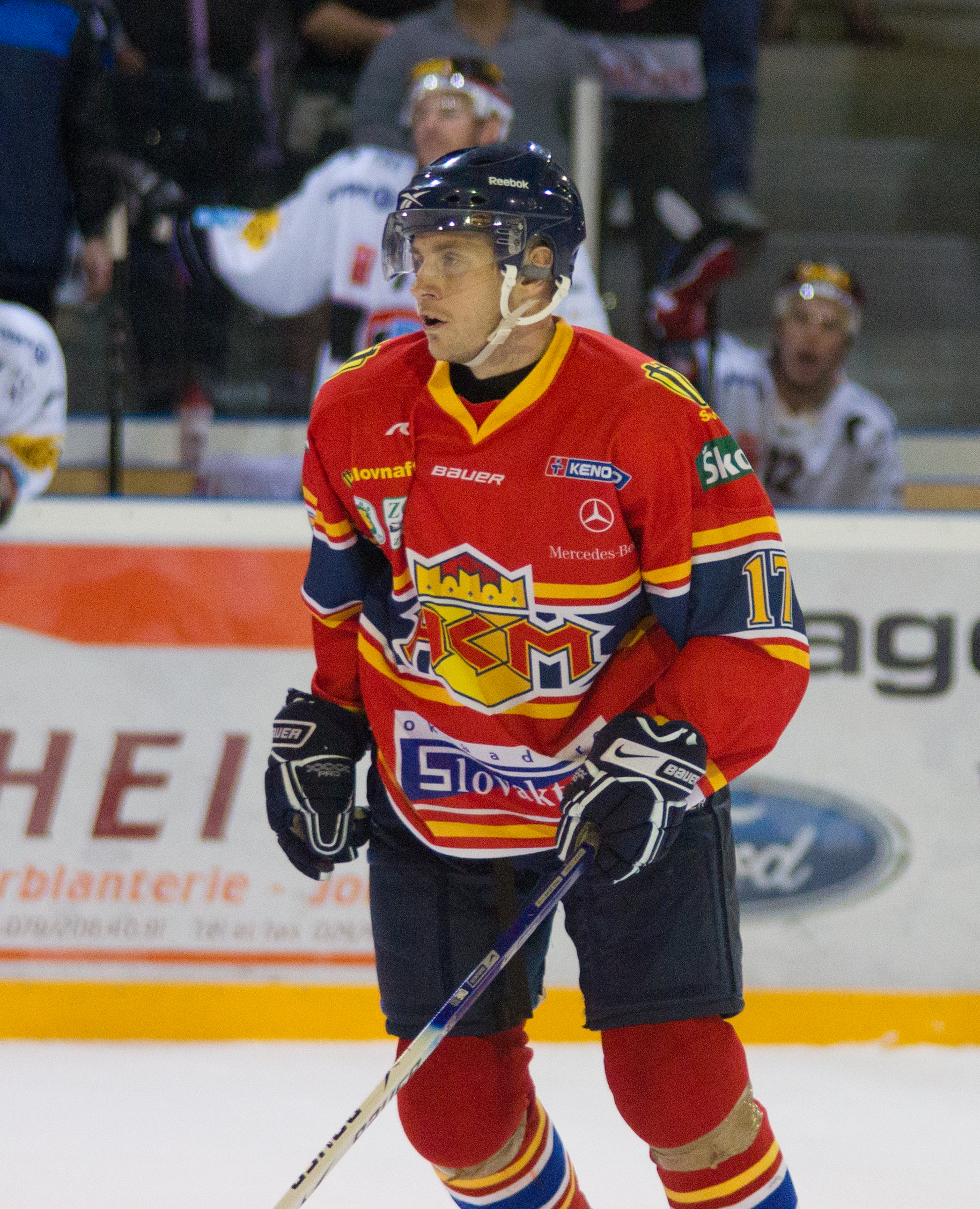
- Born: April 6, 1977 (age 47); Trenčín, Czechoslovakia
- Height: 5 ft 11 in (180 cm)
- Weight: 181 lb (82 kg; 12 st 13 lb)
- Position: Forward
- Shot: Right
- Played for: HK Dukla Trenčín; HK Spišská Nová Ves; HC Zlín; HC Oceláři Třinec; BK Mladá Boleslav; HKm Zvolen; MsHK Žilina; HK Nitra
- Playing career: 1996–2016

Peter Barinka (born April 6, 1977) is a Slovak former professional ice hockey player.

He played in the Czech Extraliga for HC Zlín, HC Oceláři Třinec and BK Mladá Boleslav. He also played in the Slovak Extraliga for HK Dukla Trenčín, HK Spišská Nová Ves, HKm Zvolen, MsHK Žilina and HK Nitra.
