= Nic Petan =

Canadian ice hockey player (born 1995)

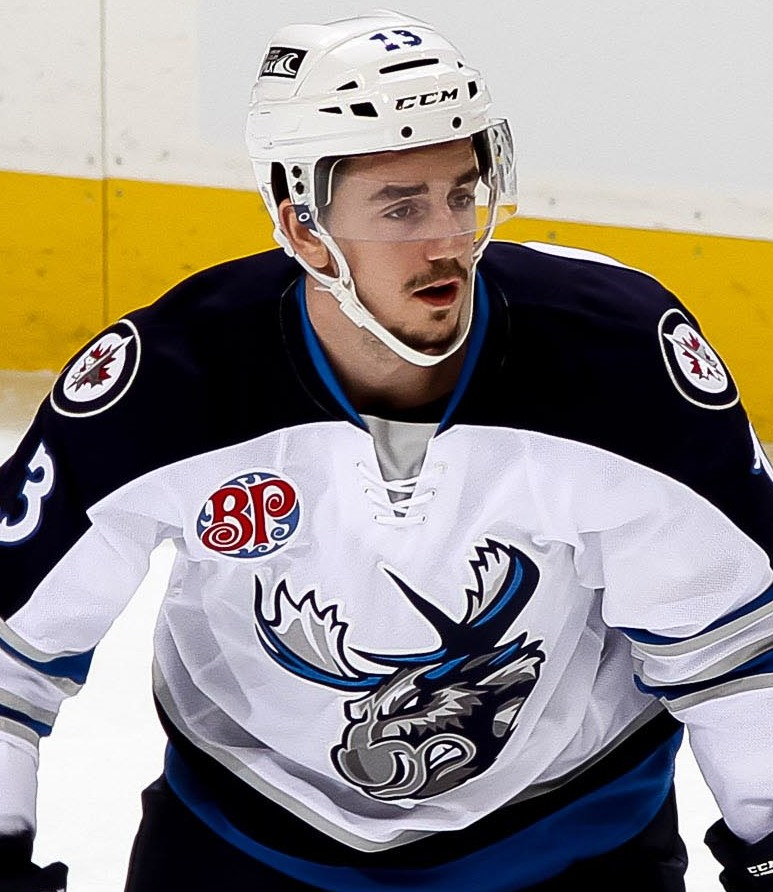
- Petan with the Manitoba Moose in 2015
- Born: March 22, 1995 (age 31) Delta, British Columbia, Canada
- Height: 5 ft 9 in (175 cm)
- Weight: 180 lb (82 kg; 12 st 12 lb)
- Position: Centre
- Shoots: Left
- KHL team Former teams: Shanghai Dragons; Winnipeg Jets; Toronto Maple Leafs; Vancouver Canucks; Minnesota Wild; Ak Bars Kazan; HC Ambrì-Piotta
- NHL draft: 43rd overall, 2013; Winnipeg Jets
- Playing career: 2015–present

Nicolas Petan (born March 22, 1995) is a Canadian professional ice hockey centre who plays for the Shanghai Dragons of the Kontinental Hockey League. Petan was selected by the Winnipeg Jets in the second round, 43rd overall, of the 2013 NHL entry draft.

== Playing career ==
=== Amateur ===
As a youth, Petan played in the 2007 and 2008 Quebec International Pee-Wee Hockey Tournaments with a minor ice hockey team from North shore.

Petan, who played in the Western Hockey League (WHL) beginning in the 2010–11 season with the Portland Winterhawks, was rewarded for his outstanding performance in the 2012–13 season by being named to the 2013 WHL West First All-Star Team. Petan led the WHL with 74 assists, and shared the overall points title with Brendan Leipsic, finishing with 120 points in 68 games. Petan scored 9 goals with 19 assists in 21 playoff games and was +13 with 16 penalty minutes. The Winterhawks reached the 2013 Memorial Cup championship game, losing 6–4 to the Halifax Mooseheads. Petan scored one goal and nine assists and was +1 in five Memorial Cup games.

In the 2013–14 season, Petan had 35 goals and led the WHL with 78 assists, finishing +47 with 69 penalty minutes. Portland finished first in the U.S. Division and reached the WHL Finals for the fourth straight year. The Winterhawks lost to the eventual Memorial Cup champions, the Edmonton Oil Kings. Petan scored 7 goals with 21 assists and was +7, with 38 penalty minutes in 21 playoff games.

In December 2013, Petan signed a three-year, entry-level contract with the Winnipeg Jets. In 2014–15, Petan returned to the Winterhawks for his final year of junior eligibility and finished with 89 points in the regular season and another 28 points in the playoffs.

=== Professional ===
After finishing major junior hockey, Petan immediately jumped to the NHL, starting the 2015–16 season with the Winnipeg Jets. He scored a goal in his NHL debut for the Jets on October 8, 2015, against Tuukka Rask of the Boston Bruins. On November 19, 2015, he was reassigned to the Jets' American Hockey League (AHL) affiliate, the Manitoba Moose. On March 17, 2016, the Jets recalled Petan.

Petan made the Jets' opening night roster for the 2017–18 season, but was reassigned to the Moose after playing in six games. He scored at a point-per-game pace with Manitoba, registering 15 goals and 37 assists in 52 games. He was recalled to the Jets on two occasions finishing with 2 goals in 15 games. On August 1, 2018, following the completion of his entry-level contract earlier in the off-season, Petan was signed as a restricted free agent to a one-year, two-way extension with the Jets.

Petan, now waiver eligible, began the 2018–19 season with the Jets. He played sparingly for the Central Division-contending Jets, appearing in just 13 games approaching the trade deadline before he was traded to the Toronto Maple Leafs in exchange for Pär Lindholm on February 25, 2019. On March 21, Petan signed a two-year contract extension with the Leafs.

On July 28, 2021, the Vancouver Canucks signed Petan to a one-year, two-way contract worth $750,000 at the NHL level.

At the conclusion of his contract with the Canucks, Petan left as a free agent and signed his first contract with an American team, agreeing to a two-year, two-way contract with the Minnesota Wild on July 13, 2022.

On March 8, 2024, the Wild traded Petan to the New York Rangers in exchange for Turner Elson. He immediately joined AHL affiliate, the Hartford Wolf Pack, where he played out the remainder of the season by posting 8 points in 15 regular season appearances and 4 points through 10 playoff games.

As a free agent after his contract with the Rangers concluded, Petan was signed to his first contract abroad in agreeing to join Russian outfit, Ak Bars Kazan of the Kontinental Hockey League (KHL) on a one-year deal on July 29, 2024.

After a lone season in the KHL, Petan moved to Switzerland in agreeing to a two-year contract with HC Ambrì-Piotta of the National League (NL) on June 23, 2025. On October 29, 2025, Petan was released by HC Ambri-Piotta after struggling to adapt offensively in Switzerland. He only managed to score one goal in 15 games with Ambri-Piotta while posting a +/- of -13.

On July 13, 2026, Petan signed a one-year deal with the Shanghai Dragons of the Kontinental Hockey League.

== International play ==
Medal record

Ice hockey

Representing (Canada)

Ivan Hlinka Memorial Tournament
Gold medal – first place	2012 Piešťany	

World Junior Championships
Gold medal – first place	2015 Canada	

At the 2012 Ivan Hlinka Memorial Tournament, Petan helped Canada's under-18 team win the gold medal. During the 2013–14 season, he represented the WHL in the Subway Series, then played for Canada's under-20 team at the 2014 World Junior Ice Hockey Championships. He was invited back to represent Canada at the 2015 World Junior Ice Hockey Championships, where he was instrumental in Canada's gold medal win, including scoring a hat-trick against Slovakia in the semi-final.

== Personal life ==
Petan was born on March 22, 1995, in Delta, British Columbia, to mother Rosanna and father Franc. Nic has an older brother who is also a hockey player, Alex.

== Career statistics ==
=== Regular season and playoffs ===
			Regular season					Playoffs
Season	Team	League	GP	G	A	Pts	PIM	GP	G	A	Pts	PIM
2010–11	Portland Winterhawks	WHL	3	0	1	1	0	7	0	0	0	0
2011–12	Portland Winterhawks	WHL	61	14	21	35	22	22	0	0	0	4
2012–13	Portland Winterhawks	WHL	71	46	74	120	43	21	9	19	28	16
2013–14	Portland Winterhawks	WHL	63	35	78	113	69	21	7	21	28	38
2014–15	Portland Winterhawks	WHL	54	15	74	89	41	17	10	18	28	20
2015–16	Winnipeg Jets	NHL	26	2	4	6	10	—	—	—	—	—
2015–16	Manitoba Moose	AHL	47	9	23	32	26	—	—	—	—	—
2016–17	Manitoba Moose	AHL	9	4	1	5	4	—	—	—	—	—
2016–17	Winnipeg Jets	NHL	54	1	12	13	12	—	—	—	—	—
2017–18	Winnipeg Jets	NHL	15	2	0	2	6	—	—	—	—	—
2017–18	Manitoba Moose	AHL	52	15	37	52	24	9	1	3	4	8
2018–19	Winnipeg Jets	NHL	13	0	2	2	2	—	—	—	—	—
2018–19	Toronto Maple Leafs	NHL	5	1	0	1	0	—	—	—	—	—
2019–20	Toronto Maple Leafs	NHL	16	0	3	3	4	—	—	—	—	—
2019–20	Toronto Marlies	AHL	25	10	21	31	10	—	—	—	—	—
2020–21	Toronto Maple Leafs	NHL	7	0	1	1	4	—	—	—	—	—
2020–21	Toronto Marlies	AHL	14	7	8	15	6	—	—	—	—	—
2021–22	Abbotsford Canucks	AHL	37	12	32	44	20	2	0	1	1	2
2021–22	Vancouver Canucks	NHL	18	0	2	2	4	—	—	—	—	—
2022–23	Iowa Wild	AHL	53	23	39	62	50	2	0	1	1	0
2022–23	Minnesota Wild	NHL	10	1	2	3	2	—	—	—	—	—
2023–24	Iowa Wild	AHL	44	12	28	40	26	—	—	—	—	—
2023–24	Minnesota Wild	NHL	6	0	2	2	2	—	—	—	—	—
2023–24	Hartford Wolf Pack	AHL	15	3	5	8	6	10	1	3	4	6
2024–25	Ak Bars Kazan	KHL	47	11	33	44	20	13	2	4	6	10
2025–26	HC Ambri-Piotta	NL	15	1	3	4	4	—	—	—	—	—
NHL totals			170	7	28	35	46	—	—	—	—	—
KHL totals			47	11	33	44	20	13	2	4	6	10

=== International ===
Year	Team	Event	Result	GP	G	A	Pts	PIM
2014	Canada	WJC	4th	7	4	1	5	12
2015	Canada	WJC	1st place, gold medalist(s)	7	4	7	11	0
Junior totals				14	8	8	16	12

== Awards and honours ==
Award	Year	Ref
WHL
West First All-Star Team	2013, 2014	
WHL Plus-Minus Award	2013	
Bob Clarke Trophy	2013	
CHL Top Prospects Game	2013	
CHL Top Scorer Award	2013	
West Second All-Star Team	2015	
