= Róbert Lantoši =

Slovak ice hockey player (born 1995)

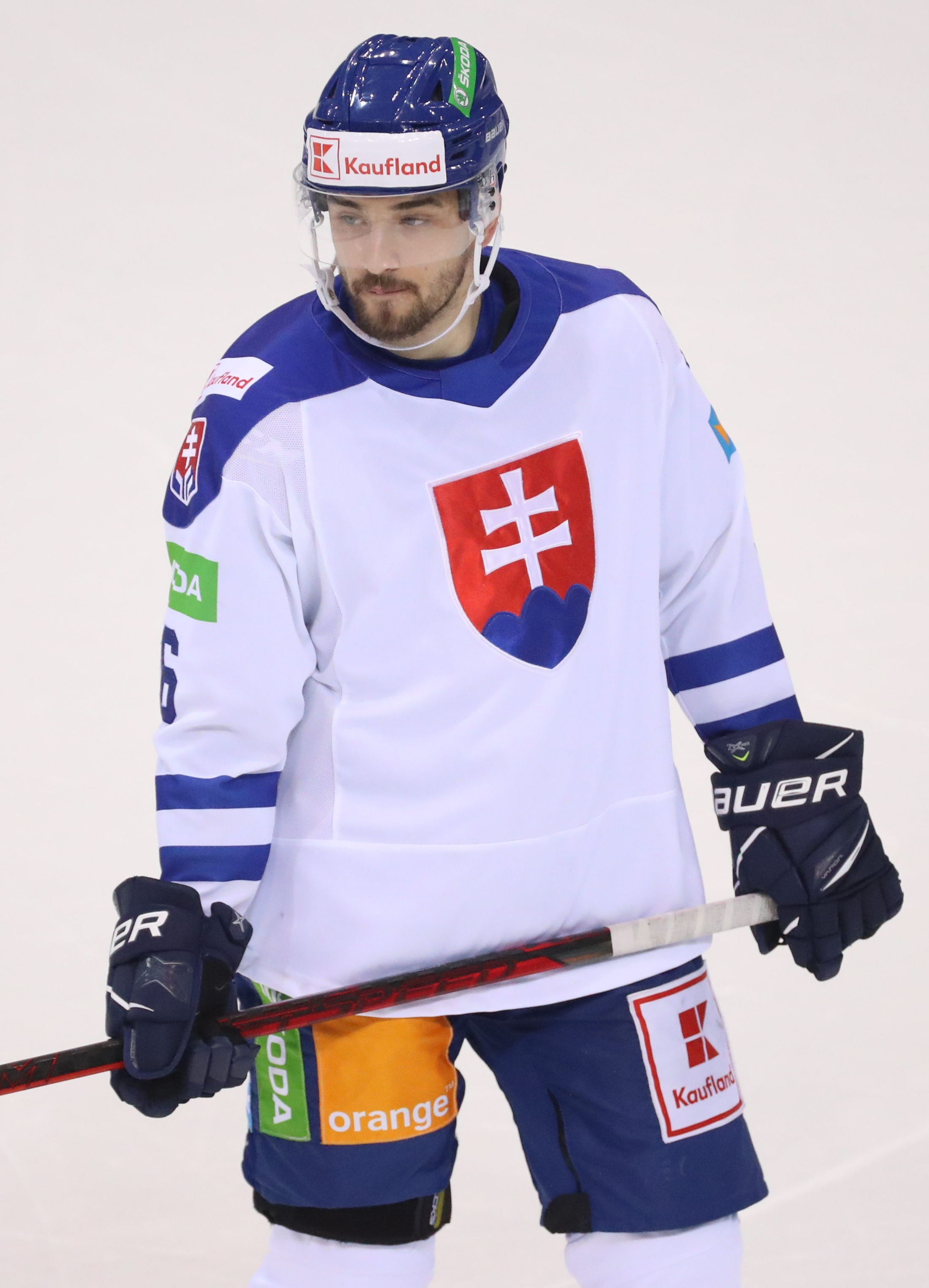
- Born: 24 September 1995 (age 30) Prievidza, Slovakia
- Height: 5 ft 11 in (180 cm)
- Weight: 185 lb (84 kg; 13 st 3 lb)
- Position: Forward
- Shoots: Right
- ELH team Former teams: Motor České Budějovice; HC Nové Zámky; HK Nitra; Providence Bruins; Rögle BK; Linköping HC; BK Mladá Boleslav; HC Bílí Tygři Liberec
- National team: Slovakia
- NHL draft: Undrafted
- Playing career: 2013–present

Róbert Lantoši (born 24 September 1995) is a Slovak professional ice hockey forward who is currently playing for Motor České Budějovice in the Czech Extraliga (ELH).

== Playing career ==
Lantoši played as a youth with MsHK Žilina before continuing his junior career in Sweden within the developmental system of VIK Västerås HK. He made his professional debut in the HockeyAllsvenskan during the 2013–14 season, scoring a goal in just one game with VIK.

On 1 July 2017, Lantoši opted to return to his native Slovakia, securing a contract with HC Nové Zámky of the Tipsport liga. During the 2017–18 season, after registering 11 points in 38 games, Lantoši was traded to HK Nitra on 14 January 2018.

After parts of two seasons with Nitra, Lantoši left as a free agent, opting to pursue a career in North America. He signed a one-year AHL contract with the Providence Bruins on July 8, 2019. In his debut North American season in 2019–20, Lantoši was productive offensively, collecting 11 goals and 31 points in 50 regular season games before the season was prematurely ended due to the COVID-19 pandemic.

As a free agent, Lantoši was signed by Providence's NHL affiliate, the Boston Bruins, agreeing to a one-year, entry-level contract on 6 August 2020. On 10 August 2020, Lantoši agreed to return to former Slovak club HK Nitra on loan until the commencement of the delayed 2020–21 North American season.

After two seasons with the Providence Bruins and as an impending restricted free agent from the Boston Bruins, Lantoši opted to return to Europe by agreeing to a one-year contract with Swedish club, Rögle BK of the SHL, on 23 July 2021. In the following 2021–22 season, Lantoši made just 6 appearances with Rögle, before leaving the club for an increased role with fellow SHL club, Linköping HC, on 11 October 2021.

After a lone season with HC Bílí Tygři Liberec in 2024–25, Lantoši left Liberec as a free agent to add a veteran presence with Motor České Budějovice in signing a three-year contract on 1 April 2025.

== International play ==
Medal record

Ice hockey

Representing Slovakia

World Junior Championships
Bronze medal – third place	2015 Canada	

On 11 November 2018, Lantoši made his senior national team debut in Deutschland Cup match against Germany. He was selected to make his full IIHF international debut, participating for Slovakia in the 2019 IIHF World Championship.

== Career statistics ==
=== Regular season and playoffs ===
			Regular season					Playoffs
Season	Team	League	GP	G	A	Pts	PIM	GP	G	A	Pts	PIM
2012–13	VIK Västerås HK	J20	7	2	1	3	4	—	—	—	—	—
2013–14	VIK Västerås HK	J20	44	14	10	24	24	3	0	0	0	0
2013–14	VIK Västerås HK	Allsv	1	1	0	1	0	—	—	—	—	—
2014–15	VIK Västerås HK	J20	32	13	15	28	10	—	—	—	—	—
2014–15	VIK Västerås HK	Allsv	15	1	1	2	0	—	—	—	—	—
2014–15	IFK Arboga	Div.1	7	3	7	10	4	—	—	—	—	—
2015–16	VIK Västerås HK	J20	3	1	2	3	0	—	—	—	—	—
2015–16	VIK Västerås HK	Allsv	29	2	0	2	4	—	—	—	—	—
2015–16	IFK Arboga	Div.1	4	1	2	3	2	—	—	—	—	—
2015–16	HC Vita Hästen	Allsv	8	0	0	0	0	—	—	—	—	—
2015–16	Lindlövens IF	Div.1	8	0	8	8	4	3	0	0	0	0
2016–17	IF Sundsvall	Div.1	40	16	11	27	16	3	2	0	2	2
2017–18	HC Nové Zámky	Slovak	38	6	5	11	8	—	—	—	—	—
2017–18	HC Nové Zámky B	Slovak.1	5	6	3	9	4	—	—	—	—	—
2017–18	HK Nitra	Slovak	9	1	2	3	0	8	1	2	3	2
2018–19	HK Nitra	Slovak	56	20	38	58	12	18	3	7	10	0
2019–20	Providence Bruins	AHL	50	11	20	31	22	—	—	—	—	—
2020–21	HK Nitra	Slovak	18	4	14	18	6	—	—	—	—	—
2020–21	Providence Bruins	AHL	25	9	6	15	16	—	—	—	—	—
2021–22	Rögle BK	SHL	6	1	0	1	0	—	—	—	—	—
2021–22	Linköping HC	SHL	42	10	12	22	31	—	—	—	—	—
2022–23	BK Mladá Boleslav	ELH	46	7	20	27	16	4	0	2	2	2
2023–24	BK Mladá Boleslav	ELH	50	20	27	47	28	—	—	—	—	—
2024–25	HC Bílí Tygři Liberec	ELH	51	11	31	42	45	5	1	1	2	6
Slovak totals			121	31	59	90	26	26	4	9	13	2
SHL totals			48	11	12	23	31	—	—	—	—	—
ELH totals			147	38	78	116	89	9	1	3	4	8

=== International ===
Year	Team	Event	Result	GP	G	A	Pts	PIM
2012	Slovakia	IH18	8th	4	1	1	2	2
2013	Slovakia	WJC18	9th	6	4	3	7	0
2015	Slovakia	WJC	3rd place, bronze medalist(s)	7	1	2	3	6
2019	Slovakia	WC	9th	7	0	2	2	4
2021	Slovakia	WC	8th	8	1	5	6	4
2021	Slovakia	OGQ	Q	3	0	1	1	2
2022	Slovakia	WC	8th	8	0	4	4	6
2023	Slovakia	WC	9th	6	1	1	2	0
2024	Slovakia	OGQ	Q	3	2	0	2	2
2025	Slovakia	WC	11th	6	1	1	2	2
Junior totals				13	5	5	10	6
Senior totals				41	5	14	19	20
