= 2015 World Junior Ice Hockey Championships =

Ice hockey championship series

2015 IIHF World U20 Championship

Tournament details
- Host country: Canada
- Cities: Toronto, Montreal
- Venue(s): Air Canada Centre; Centre Bell (in 2 host cities)
- Dates: December 26, 2014 – January 5, 2015
- Teams: 10

Final positions
- Champions: Canada (16th title)
- Runners-up: Russia
- Third place: Slovakia
- Fourth place: Sweden

Tournament statistics
- Games played: 30
- Goals scored: 176 (5.87 per game)
- Attendance: 366,370 (12,212 per game)
- Scoring leader: (Canada) Sam Reinhart (11 points)

Awards
- MVP: (Slovakia) Denis Godla

Official website
- 2015 World Juniors

The 2015 World Junior Ice Hockey Championships was the 39th edition of Ice Hockey World Junior Championship, played from December 26, 2014 to January 5, 2015. It was co-hosted by Toronto, Ontario, and Montreal, Quebec, Canada, and organized by Hockey Canada, Hockey Quebec, the Ontario Hockey Federation, the Montreal Canadiens, Maple Leafs Sports and Entertainment and Evenko. Games were split between Air Canada Centre in Toronto and Bell Centre in Montreal, with Montreal hosting Group A matches and two quarter finals, and Toronto hosting Group B, along with the relegation games, two quarter finals, along with the semi-finals, bronze medal, and gold medal games.

After failing to medal at the previous two editions of the tournament, Canada beat Russia in the final to win the gold medal, marking Canada's first medal at the World Juniors since 2012, and Canada's first gold since 2009. Slovakia defeated Sweden in the bronze medal game to win their second-ever medal. Germany finished tenth overall and was relegated to Division I-A for the 2016 tournament. Slovak goaltender Denis Godla was named the tournament's most valuable player, while Sam Reinhart of Canada was the scoring leader with 11 points.

== Player eligibility ==
A player is eligible to play in the 2015 World Junior Ice Hockey Championships if:

- the player is of male gender;
- the player was born at the earliest in 1995, and at the latest, in 2000;
- the player is a citizen in the country he represents;
- the player is under the jurisdiction of a national association that is a member of the IIHF.

If a player who has never played in IIHF-organized competition wishes to switch national eligibility, he must have played in competitions for two consecutive years in the new country without playing in another country, as well as show his move to the new country's national association with an international transfer card. In case the player has previously played in IIHF-organized competition but wishes to switch national eligibility, he must have played in competitions for four consecutive years in the new country without playing in another country, he must show his move to the new country's national association with an international transfer card, as well as be a citizen of the new country. A player may only switch national eligibility once.

== Top Division ==
=== Venues ===
| Toronto | 2015 World Junior Ice Hockey Championships is located in Canada | Montreal |
| Air Canada Centre Capacity: 18,800 | 2015 World Junior Ice Hockey Championships is located in Canada | Bell Centre Capacity: 21,287 |

=== Match officials ===
The IIHF selected 12 referees and 10 linesmen to officiate during the tournament:

Referees

- (Slovakia) Vladimír Baluška
- (Germany) Lars Bruggemann
- (Russia) Roman Gofman
- (Czech Republic) Antonin Jeřábek
- (Finland) Mikko Kaukokari
- (United States) Geoffrey Miller
- (Sweden) Linus Öhlund
- (Russia) Konstantin Olenin
- (United States) Steve Patafie
- (Canada) Pascal St-Jaques
- (Sweden) Marcus Vinnerborg
- (Switzerland) Tobias Wehrli

Linesmen

- (Canada) Jordan Browne
- (France) Pierre Dehaen
- (Russia) Gleb Lazarev
- (Czech Republic) Miroslav Lhotský
- (Sweden) Andreas Malmqvist
- (Canada) Bevan Mills
- (Finland) Jani Pesonen
- (Germany) Nikolaj Ponomarjow
- (United States) Judson Ritter
- (Switzerland) Simon Wust

=== Format ===
The four best ranked teams from each group of the preliminary round advance to the quarterfinals, while the last placed teams from each group played a relegation round in a best of three format to determine the relegated team.

=== Preliminary round ===
All times are local. (Eastern Standard Time – UTC-5)

==== Group A ====
| Pos | Team | Pld | W | OTW | OTL | L | GF | GA | GD | Pts | Qualification |
|---|---|---|---|---|---|---|---|---|---|---|---|
| 1 | Canada | 4 | 4 | 0 | 0 | 0 | 21 | 4 | +17 | 12 | Quarterfinals |
| 2 | United States | 4 | 2 | 1 | 0 | 1 | 14 | 6 | +8 | 8 | Quarterfinals |
| 3 | Slovakia | 4 | 2 | 0 | 0 | 2 | 7 | 14 | −7 | 6 | Quarterfinals |
| 4 | Finland | 4 | 1 | 0 | 1 | 2 | 5 | 8 | −3 | 4 | Quarterfinals |
| 5 | Germany | 4 | 0 | 0 | 0 | 4 | 2 | 17 | −15 | 0 | Relegation round |

Source: IIHF

| December 26, 2014; 15:00 | Finland | 1–2 GWS (1–1, 0–0, 0–0) (OT 0–0) (SO: 1–2) | United States | Centre Bell; Attendance: 8,006 |

Game reference
| Ville Husso | Goalies | Thatcher Demko | Referees: (Russia) Konstantin Olenin (Switzerland) Tobias Wehril; Linesmen: (Russia) Gleb Lazarev (Canada) Bevan Mills |
| M. Rantanen – 01:22 / 1–0; / 1–1 / 13:54 – A. Tuch (J. Eichel, T. DeAngelo) (PP) | | | Referees: (Russia) Konstantin Olenin (Switzerland) Tobias Wehril; Linesmen: (Russia) Gleb Lazarev (Canada) Bevan Mills |
| A. Lehkonen; J. Ikonen (miss); K. Kapanen (miss) | Shootout | J. Eichel; (miss) S. Milano; C. De Leo | Referees: (Russia) Konstantin Olenin (Switzerland) Tobias Wehril; Linesmen: (Russia) Gleb Lazarev (Canada) Bevan Mills |
| 12 min | Penalties | 12 min | Referees: (Russia) Konstantin Olenin (Switzerland) Tobias Wehril; Linesmen: (Russia) Gleb Lazarev (Canada) Bevan Mills |
| 29 | Shots | 38 | Referees: (Russia) Konstantin Olenin (Switzerland) Tobias Wehril; Linesmen: (Russia) Gleb Lazarev (Canada) Bevan Mills |

| December 26, 2014; 20:00 | Canada | 8–0 (3–0, 4–0, 1–0) | Slovakia | Centre Bell; Attendance: 14,142 |

Game reference

Zachary Fucale
Goalies
Denis Godla
Dávid Okoličány
Referees:
(United States) Steve Patafie
(Sweden) Marcus Vinnerborg
Linesmen:
(Czech Republic) Miroslav Lhotský
(Switzerland) Simon Wust

| R. Fabbri (A. Duclair, S. Reinhart) – 4:52 | 1–0 |
| A. Duclair (M. Domi) – 8:17 | 2–0 |
| R. Fabbri (N. Petan, M. Bowey) – 9:09 | 3–0 |
| N. Paul (L. Crouse, J. Virtanen) – 26:56 | 4–0 |
| B. Point (R. Fabbri, N. Petan) – 31:35 | 5–0 |
| M. Domi (S. Reinhart) – 36:14 | 6–0 |
| N. Petan (R. Fabbri, J. Hicketts) – 37:21 | 7–0 |
| J. Virtanen (B. Point) – 56:41 | 8–0 |

6 min
Penalties
16 min
34
Shots
12

| December 27, 2014; 16:00 | Slovakia | 2–1 (1–1, 1–0, 0–0) | Finland | Centre Bell; Attendance: 6,007 |

Game reference

Denis Godla
Goalies
Juuse Saros
Referees:
(Canada) Pascal St-Jacques
(Sweden) Marcus Vinnerborg
Linesmen:
(Canada) Bevan Mills
(Switzerland) Simon Wust

| | 0–1 | 07:01 – M. Rantanen (J. Ikonen, R. Hintz) |
| P. Cehlárik (M. Réway) (PP) – 09:19 | 1–1 |
| M. Holenda (M. Réway, C. Jaroš) – 26:03 | 2–1 |

12 min
Penalties
6 min
12
Shots
38

| December 27, 2014; 20:00 | Germany | 0–4 (0–2, 0–0, 0–2) | Canada | Centre Bell; Attendance: 12,733 |

Game reference

Kevin Reich
Goalies
Eric Comrie
Referees:
(United States) Geoffrey Miller
(Switzerland) Tobias Wehril
Linesmen:
(Russia) Gleb Lazarev
(Sweden) Andreas Malmqvist

| 0–1 | 04:11 – C. McDavid (J. Morrissey, N. Petan) (PP) |
| 0–2 | 12:42 – C. Lazar (C. McDavid, N. Petan) (PP) |
| 0–3 | 49:14 – M. Domi (S. Reinhart) |
| 0–4 | 55:44 – M. Bowey (N. Petan, C. McDavid) (PP) |

18 min
Penalties
22 min
17
Shots
31

| December 28, 2014; 20:00 | United States | 6–0 (2–0, 2–0, 2–0) | Germany | Centre Bell; Attendance: 7,000 |

Game reference

Brandon Halverson
Goalies
Ilja Sharipov
Referees:
(Slovakia) Vladimír Baluška
(Finland) Mikko Kaukokari
Linesmen:
(Czech Republic) Miroslav Lhotský
(Sweden) Andreas Malmqvist

| A. Matthews (N. Schmaltz) – 04:44 | 1–0 |
| H. Fasching (D. Larkin) – 12:30 | 2–0 |
| S. Milano – 22:48 | 3–0 |
| D. Larkin (N. Hanifin) – 35:04 | 4–0 |
| J. Eichel (T. Motte, A. Tuch) – 54:09 | 5–0 |
| D. Larkin (H. Fasching, Z. Werenski) – 59:40 | 6–0 |

6 min
Penalties
14 min
53
Shots
14

| December 29, 2014; 16:00 | United States | 3–0 (0–0, 1–0, 2–0) | Slovakia | Centre Bell; Attendance: 8,798 |

Game reference

Thatcher Demko
Goalies
Denis Godla
Referees:
(Russia) Roman Gofman
(Switzerland) Tobias Wehrli
Linesmen:
(Czech Republic) Miroslav Lhotsky
(Canada) Bevan Mills

| S. Milano (D. Larkin) – 37:42 | 1–0 |
| D. Larkin – 42:38 | 2–0 |
| J. Hayden (B. Carlo, A. Matthews) – 59:07 | 3–0 |

4 min
Penalties
2 min
45
Shots
17

| December 29, 2014; 20:00 | Finland | 1–4 (0–1, 1–1, 0–2) | Canada | Centre Bell; Attendance: 15,718 |

Game reference

Juuse Saros
Goalies
Zachary Fucale
Referees:
(Germany) Lars Bruggemann
(Czech Republic) Antonin Jeřábek
Linesmen:
(Russia) Gleb Lazarev
(Switzerland) Simon Wust

| | 0–1 | 05:32 – S. Reinhart (S. Theodore) (PP) |
| | 0–2 | 33:34 – S.Reinhart (A. Duclair, M. Domi) |
| A. Lehkonen – 38:46 | 1–2 |
| | 1–3 | 51:15 – A. Duclair (M. Domi, M. Bowey) |
| | 1–4 | 54:25 – C. Lazar (J. Morrissey, R. Fabbri) (PP) |

8 min
Penalties
6 min
28
Shots
36

| December 30, 2014; 20:00 | Slovakia | 5–2 (3–1, 0–0, 2–1) | Germany | Centre Bell; Attendance: 5,568 |

Game reference

Denis Godla
Goalies
Ilja Sharipov
Referees:
(Finland) Mikko Kaukokari
(Sweden) Linus Öhlund
Linesmen:
(Sweden) Andreas Malmqvist
(Switzerland) Simon Wust

| R. Lantoši (P. Cehlárik, E. Černák) – 09:58 | 1–0 |
| M. Réway (D. Soltes) – 13:10 | 2–0 |
| M. Sukeľ (P. Koyš, M. Rosandić) – 15:03 | 3–0 |
| | 3–1 | 18:46 – F. Tiffels (D. Kahun) (PP) |
| M. Réway – 44:05 | 4–1 |
| | 4–2 | 45:36 – F. Tiffels (PS) |
| M. Reway (ENG) – 59:05 | 5–2 |

8 min
Penalties
4 min
35
Shots
30

| December 31, 2014; 16:00 | Canada | 5–3 (0–0, 2–1, 3–2) | United States | Centre Bell; Attendance: 18,295 |

Game reference

Eric Comrie
Goalies
Thatcher Demko
Referees:
(Finland) Mikko Kaukokari
(Sweden) Marcus Vinnerborg
Linesmen:
(Czech Republic) Miroslav Lhotský
(Sweden) Andreas Malmqvist

| M. Domi (S. Reinhart) – 27:07 | 1–0 |
| J. Morrissey (R. Fabbri, N. Petan) (PP) – 30:11 | 2–0 |
| | 2–1 | 33:12 – T. DeAngelo (J. Eichel, S. Milano) (PP) |
| C. Lazar (C. McDavid) – 50:01 | 3–1 |
| | 3–2 | 57:26 – D. Larkin (H. Fasching, S. Milano) |
| S. Reinhart (ENG) – 59:06 | 4–2 |
| | 4–3 | 59:18 – D. Larkin |
| M. Domi (S. Reinhart) (ENG) – 59:56 | 5–3 |

6 min
Penalties
4 min
43
Shots
28

| December 31, 2014; 20:00 | Germany | 0–2 (0–1, 0–1, 0–0) | Finland | Centre Bell; Attendance: 3,991 |

Game reference
| Kevin Reich | Goalies | Ville Husso | Referees: (Russia) Roman Gofman (Russia) Konstantin Olenin; Linesmen: (Russia) Gleb Lazarev (Canada) Bevan Mills |
| 0–1 / 02:47 – J. Honka; 0–2 / 34:22 – M. Rantanen (J. Lyytinen, A. Mäkelä) | | | Referees: (Russia) Roman Gofman (Russia) Konstantin Olenin; Linesmen: (Russia) Gleb Lazarev (Canada) Bevan Mills |
| 8 min | Penalties | 2 min | Referees: (Russia) Roman Gofman (Russia) Konstantin Olenin; Linesmen: (Russia) Gleb Lazarev (Canada) Bevan Mills |
| 24 | Shots | 38 | Referees: (Russia) Roman Gofman (Russia) Konstantin Olenin; Linesmen: (Russia) Gleb Lazarev (Canada) Bevan Mills |

==== Group B ====
| Pos | Team | Pld | W | OTW | OTL | L | GF | GA | GD | Pts | Qualification |
|---|---|---|---|---|---|---|---|---|---|---|---|
| 1 | Sweden | 4 | 4 | 0 | 0 | 0 | 18 | 6 | +12 | 12 | Quarterfinals |
| 2 | Czech Republic | 4 | 1 | 1 | 0 | 2 | 12 | 14 | −2 | 5 | Quarterfinals |
| 3 | Russia | 4 | 1 | 1 | 0 | 2 | 13 | 9 | +4 | 5 | Quarterfinals |
| 4 | Denmark | 4 | 0 | 1 | 2 | 1 | 10 | 15 | −5 | 4 | Quarterfinals |
| 5 | Switzerland | 4 | 1 | 0 | 1 | 2 | 9 | 18 | −9 | 4 | Relegation round |

Source: IIHF

| December 26, 2014; 13:00 | Russia | 3–2 GWS (0–2, 1–0, 1–0) (OT 0–0) (SO: 2–0) | Denmark | Air Canada Centre; Attendance: 12,412 |

Game reference

Ilya Sorokin
Goalies
Georg Sørensen
Referees:
(Germany) Lars Bruggemann
(Czech Republic) Antonín Jeřábek
Linesmen:
(Canada) Jordan Browne
(Finland) Jani Pesonen

| | 0–1 | 13:15 – O. Bjorkstrand (M. Larsen, M. Asperup) (PP) |
| | 0–2 | 15:49 – N. Ehlers (O. Bjorkstrand, M. Larsen) (PP) |
| N. Goldobin (I. Provorov, R. Valiev) (PP) – 39:13 | 1–2 |
| M. Mamin (V. Bryukvin, A. Sharov) – 44:37 | 2–2 |

S. Tolchinski
N. Goldobin
Shootout
(miss) N. Ehlers
(miss) O. Bjorkstrand
8 min
Penalties
8 min
40
Shots
26

| December 26, 2014; 17:00 | Sweden | 5–2 (2–0, 1–2, 2–0) | Czech Republic | Air Canada Centre; Attendance: 13,077 |

Game reference

Linus Söderström
Goalies
Vítek Vaněček
Referees:
(Slovakia) Vladimír Baluška
(Finland) Mikko Kaukokari
Linesmen:
(France) Pierre Dehaen
(United States) Judson Ritter

| A. Kempe (O. Lindblom, G. Forsling) (PP) – 14:46 | 1–0 |
| J. Lööke (L. Wallmark) – 19:13 | 2–0 |
| | 2–1 | 23:33 – J. Vrána |
| | 2–2 | 30:02 – J. Vrana (O. Kaše, D. Kämpf) |
| W. Nylander (O. Lindblom) – 30:29 | 3–2 |
| A. Kempe (A. Holmström, O. Lindblom) (PP) – 45:37 | 4–2 |
| J. de la Rose (A. Blidh, G. Forsling) – 47:38 | 5–2 |

8 min
Penalties
30 min
27
Shots
29

| December 27, 2014; 13:00 | Denmark | 1–5 (0–3, 1–2, 0–0) | Sweden | Air Canada Centre; Attendance: 13,018 |

Game reference

Georg Sørensen
Thomas Lillie
Goalies
Linus Söderström
Referees:
(Russia) Roman Gofman
(Czech Republic) Antonín Jeřábek
Linesmen:
(Finland) Jani Pesonen
(Germany) Nikolaj Ponomarjow

| | 0–1 | 09:48 – L. Wallmark |
| | 0–2 | 11:36 – A. Blidh (S. Aho, W. Lagesson) |
| | 0–3 | 19:27 – W. Nylander (J. de la Rose, J. Bergman) |
| | 0–4 | 20:13 – J. de la Rose (A. Karlsson, A. Blidh) |
| N. Olesen (M. Nielsen, J. Holmberg) – 21:01 | 1–4 |
| | 1–5 | 37:26 – S. Aho (L. Wallmark, J. de la Rose) (PP) |

12 min
Penalties
8 min
20
Shots
44

| December 27, 2014; 17:00 | Czech Republic | 2–5 (2–2, 0–3, 0–0) | Switzerland | Air Canada Centre; Attendance: 12,926 |

Game reference

Vítek Vaněček
Goalies
Gauthier Descloux
Referees:
(Germany) Lars Bruggemann
(Sweden) Linus Öhlund
Linesmen:
(Canada) Jordan Browne
(France) Pierre Dehaen

| | 0–1 | 00:46 – K. Fiala (T. Meier) |
| M. Růžička (D. Němeček, M. Špaček) – 01:44 | 1–1 |
| L. Klok (P. Zdráhal, D. Pastrňák) – 04:42 | 2–1 |
| | 2–2 | 11:37 – K. Fiala (D. Malgin, T. Meier) (PP) |
| | 2–3 | 20:45 – N. Rod (L. Fazzini) |
| | 2–4 | 21:29 – T. Weiser (K. Schweri) |
| | 2–5 | 34:41 – L. Fazzini (M. Müller, N. Rod) (PP) |

4 min
Penalties
10 min
29
Shots
35

| December 28, 2014; 17:00 | Switzerland | 0–7 (0–3, 0–2, 0–2) | Russia | Air Canada Centre; Attendance: 15,125 |

Game reference

Gauthier Descloux
Ludovic Waeber
Goalies
Igor Shesterkin
Referees:
(Sweden) Linus Öhlund
(United States) Steve Patafie
Linesmen:
(Germany) Nikolaj Ponomarjow
(United States) Judson Ritter

| 0–1 | 11:28 – R. Rafikov (A. Golyshev, P. Buchnevich) (PP) |
| 0–2 | 18:26 – A. Dergachyov (A. Bryntsev) |
| 0–3 | 19:37 – P. Buchnevich (I. Barbashev, R. Rafikov) |
| 0–4 | 35:29 – S. Tolchinski (N. Goldobin, V. Kamenev) |
| 0–5 | 37:36 – A. Sharov (M. Mamin) |
| 0–6 | 54:59 – V. Kamenev (PP) |
| 0–7 | 55:41 – V. Leshchenko (I. Barbashev, P. Buchnevich) |

41 min
Penalties
22 min
32
Shots
23

| December 29, 2014; 13:00 | Czech Republic | 4–3 OT (1–1, 1–1, 1–1) (OT 1–0) | Denmark | Air Canada Centre; Attendance: 12,038 |

Game reference

Vítek Vaněček
Goalies
Georg Sørensen
Referees:
(Russia) Konstantin Olenin
(Sweden) Marcus Vinnerborg
Linesmen:
(Canada) Jordan Browne
(United States) Judson Ritter

| | 0–1 | 03:58 – M. Eller |
| J. Štencel (D. Kaše, D. Pastrňák) (PP) – 10:22 | 1–1 |
| J. Košťálek (D. Pastrňák, M. Baránek) – 24:36 | 2–1 |
| | 2–2 | 37:08 – O. Bjorkstrand (N. Ehlers, M. Asperup) (PP) |
| | 2–3 | 46:05 – M. Asperup (N. Ehlers) (PP) |
| D. Kubalík (J. Štencel, P. Zacha) – 56:58 | 3–3 |
| D. Pastrňák (J. Štencel) – 61:01 | 4–3 |

10 min
Penalties
12 min
48
Shots
14

| December 29, 2014; 17:00 | Sweden | 3–2 (1–0, 0–1, 2–1) | Russia | Air Canada Centre; Attendance: 16,710 |

Game reference

Linus Söderström
Goalies
Ilya Sorokin
Referees:
(United States) Geoffrey Miller
(Canada) Pascal St-Jacques
Linesmen:
(France) Pierre Dehaen
(Finland) Jani Pesonen

| G. Forsling (A. Kempe, A. Holmström) (PP) – 10:38 | 1–0 |
| | 1–1 | 34:15 – V. Leshenko (Z. Paigin, I. Barbashev) |
| | 1–2 | 42:23 – V. Leshenko (P. Buchnevich, R. Rafikov) |
| G. Forsling (W. Nylander, A. Kempe) (PP) – 46:44 | 2–2 |
| A. Holmström (O. Lindblom, W. Nylander) – 50:53 | 3–2 |

6 min
Penalties
12 min
26
Shots
29

| December 30, 2014; 17:00 | Switzerland | 3–4 GWS (2–1, 1–2, 0–0) (OT 0–0) (SO: 1–2) | Denmark | Air Canada Centre; Attendance: 13,263 |

Game reference

Gauthier Descloux
Goalies
Georg Sørensen
Referees:
(United States) Steve Patafie
(Canada) Pascal St-Jacques
Linesmen:
(France) Pierre Dehaen
(Germany) Nikolaj Ponomarjow

| K. Schmidli (L. Hischier) – 10:48 | 1–0 |
| K. Fiala (D. Malgin, T. Meier) – 11:54 | 2–0 |
| | 2–1 | 17:58 – O. Bjorkstrand (N. Ehlers, M. Eller) |
| | 2–2 | 32:19 – A. Krogsgaard (S. Hertzberg, M. Aagaard) (PP) |
| T. Meier (J. Siegenthaler, D. Malgin) – 32:43 | 3–2 |
| | 3–3 | 35:40 – M. Aagaard (N. Olesen) (PP) |

K. Fiala (miss)
T. Meier
N. Rod (miss)
Shootout
N. Ehlers
O. Bjorkstrand
(miss) M. Aagaard
10 min
Penalties
8 min
45
Shots
23

| December 31, 2014; 13:00 | Switzerland | 1–5 (1–1, 0–4, 0–0) | Sweden | Air Canada Centre; Attendance: 13,857 |

Game reference

Ludovic Waeber
Goalies
Linus Söderström
Referees:
(Slovakia) Vladimír Baluška
(United States) Geoffrey Miller
Linesmen:
(Germany) Nikolaj Ponomarjow
(United States) Judson Ritter

| Y. Rathgeb (L. Fazzini) – 03:29 | 1–0 |
| | 1–1 | 04:52 – A. Kempe (G. Forsling, A. Holmström) (PP) |
| | 1–2 | 23:27 – O. Lindblom (W. Nylander, A. Holmström) (PP) |
| | 1–3 | 26:03 – O. Lindblom (R. Hägg, W. Nylander) |
| | 1–4 | 34:45 – O. Lindblom (G. Forsling, S. Aho) (PP) |
| | 1–5 | 35:11 – J. Lööke (A. Karlsson, C. Ehn) (PP) |

31 min
Penalties
12 min
22
Shots
39

| December 31, 2014; 17:00 | Russia | 1–4 (0–1, 1–1, 0–2) | Czech Republic | Air Canada Centre; Attendance: 12,566 |

Game reference

Igor Shestyorkin
Goalies
Miroslav Svoboda
Referees:
(Germany) Lars Bruggemann
(Switzerland) Tobias Wehrli
Linesmen:
(Canada) Jordan Browne
(Finland) Jani Pesonen

| | 0–1 | 11:05 – P. Zdráhal (D. Pastrňák, J. Košťálek) |
| | 0–2 | 24:32 – P. Zacha (D. Pastrňák, J. Košťálek) |
| I. Barbashev (V. Leshenko) (PP) – 35:44 | 1–2 |
| | 1–3 | 42:54 – P. Zdráhal (D. Pastrňák, D. Mašín) |
| | 1–4 | 59:13 – O. Kaše (J. Vrána, D. Kämpf) (ENG) |

2 min
Penalties
6 min
17
Shots
26

=== Relegation round ===
| January 2, 2015; 11:00 | Switzerland | 5–2 (1–0, 3–1, 1–1) | Germany | Air Canada Centre; Attendance: 7,409 |

Game reference

Gauthier Descloux
Goalies
Kevin Reich
Ilja Sharipov
Referees:
(Finland) Mikko Kaukokari
(United States) Geoffrey Miller
Linesmen:
(France) Pierre Dehaen
(Finland) Jani Pesonen

| K. Fiala (N. Rod, D. Malgin) – 03:50 | 1–0 |
| N. Rod (M. Fora, D. Malgin) – 20:54 | 2–0 |
| L. Fazzini (L. Hischier) – 25:20 | 3–0 |
| | 3–1 | 28:20 – P. Tuomie (F. Tiffels) |
| L. Hischier (M. Fora, L. Fazzini) – 33:56 | 4–1 |
| N. Rod (D. Malgin) – 45:46 | 5–1 |
| | 5–2 | 55:14 – P. Kurz (M. Michaelis) |

8 min
Penalties
16 min
32
Shots
31

| January 3, 2015; 19:00 | Germany | 2–5 (1–2, 1–1, 0–2) | Switzerland | Air Canada Centre; Attendance: 8,392 |

Game reference

Kevin Reich
Goalies
Gauthier Descloux
Referees:
(Czech Republic) Antonín Jeřábek
(Sweden) Linus Öhlund
Linesmen:
(Canada) Jordan Browne
(United States) Judson Ritter

| P. Tuomie (T. Bender, M. Michaelis) (PP) – 13:58 | 1–0 |
| | 1–1 | 15:10 – J. Fuchs (L. Fazzini, T. Meier) |
| | 1–2 | 16:17 – D. Malgin (N. Rod, K. Fiala) |
| | 1–3 | 31:12 – P. Suter (L. Hischier) |
| A. Eder (F. Tiffels) (PP) – 38:10 | 2–3 |
| | 2–4 | 53:25 – P. Suter (L. Hischier) |
| | 2–5 | 54:19 – T. Meier (J. Fuchs, L. Fazzini) |

2 min
Penalties
6 min
27
Shots
27

Note: Germany was relegated to the 2016 Division I A

=== Playoff round ===
Quarterfinals
1A | Canada | 8
4B | Denmark | 0
2B | Czech Republic | 0
3A | Slovakia | 3
1B | Sweden | 6
4A | Finland | 3
2A | United States | 2
3B | Russia | 3

Semifinals
1A | Canada | 5
3A | Slovakia | 1
1B | Sweden | 1
3B | Russia | 4

Finals
1A | Canada | 5
3B | Russia | 4
Bronze medal game
1B | Sweden | 2
3A | Slovakia | 4

==== Quarterfinals ====
| January 2, 2015; 13:00 | United States | 2–3 (0–2, 1–0, 1–1) | Russia | Centre Bell; Attendance: 8,694 |

Game reference

Thatcher Demko
Goalies
Igor Shesterkin
Referees:
(Sweden) Marcus Vinnerborg
(Switzerland) Tobias Wehrli
Linesmen:
(Czech Republic) Miroslav Lhotský
(Sweden) Andreas Malmqvist

| | 0–1 | 02:31 – I. Barbashev (V. Leshenko, P. Buchnevich) (PP2) |
| | 0–2 | 15:25 - A. Sharov (A. Dergachyov, M. Mamin) |
| A. DeAngelo (W. Butcher, J. Eichel) (PP2) – 32:43 | 1–2 |
| | 1–3 | 41:27 - S. Tolchinski (Z. Paigin, N. Goldobin) (PP) |
| Z. Werenski (A. Matthews) - 48:56 | 2–3 |

16 min
Penalties
10 min
41
Shots
25

| January 2, 2015; 15:00 | Sweden | 6–3 (0–0, 3–3, 3–0) | Finland | Air Canada Centre; Attendance: 14,440 |

Game reference

Linus Söderström
Goalies
Ville Husso
Referees:
(United States) Steve Patafie
(Canada) Pascal St-Jacques
Linesmen:
(Canada) Jordan Browne
(Switzerland) Simon Wust

| | 0–1 | 21:44 – J. Ikonen |
| G. Forsling (W. Nylander, A. Kempe) (PP2) – 24:03 | 1–1 |
| L. Wallmark (S. Aho, V. Olofsson) (PP) – 24:50 | 2–1 |
| A. Brodecki (R. Norell, G. Forsling) – 28:11 | 3–1 |
| | 3–2 | 29:54 – M. Rantanen (J. Ikonen, R. Hintz) |
| | 3–3 | 35:49 – K. Kapanen (A. Mustonen, J. Honka) |
| A. Kempe (O. Lindblom, A. Holmström) (PP2) – 41:24 | 4–3 |
| O. Lindblom (W. Nylander) – 53:52 | 5–3 |
| L. Wallmark (R. Hägg) (ENG) – 59:56 | 6–3 |

12 min
Penalties
12 min
30
Shots
33

| January 2, 2015; 17:00 | Czech Republic | 0–3 (0–1, 0–0, 0–2) | Slovakia | Centre Bell; Attendance: 7,696 |

Game reference

Miroslav Svoboda
Goalies
Denis Godla
Referees:
(Russia) Roman Gofman
(Russia) Konstantin Olenin
Linesmen:
(Russia) Gleb Lazarev
(Canada) Bevan Mills

| 0–1 | M. Kabáč (P. Koyš) – 18:46 |
| 0–2 | P. Cehlárik (R. Lantoši, M. Rosandić) – 54:18 |
| 0–3 | M. Réway (ENG) – 59:51 |

4 min
Penalties
10 min
34
Shots
36

| January 2, 2015; 20:00 | Canada | 8–0 (2–0, 3–0, 3–0) | Denmark | Air Canada Centre; Attendance: 18,448 |

Game reference

Zachary Fucale
Goalies
Georg Sorensen
Thomas Lillie
Referees:
(Germany) Lars Bruggemann
(Sweden) Linus Öhlund
Linesmen:
(Germany) Nikolaj Ponomarjow
(United States) Judson Ritter

| C. Lazar (C. McDavid) – 10:37 | 1–0 |
| S. Reinhart (A. Duclair) – 15:17 | 2–0 |
| L. Crouse (F. Gauthier) – 27:50 | 3–0 |
| C. McDavid – 30:21 | 4–0 |
| C. Lazar (J. Hicketts) – 33:21 | 5–0 |
| N. Paul (J. Virtanen, N. Petan) – 43:08 | 6–0 |
| B. Point (C. McDavid, C. Lazar) – 45:09 | 7–0 |
| N. Ritchie (L. Crouse, J. Hicketts) (PP) – 59:06 | 8–0 |

6 min
Penalties
8 min
50
Shots
14

==== Semifinals ====
| January 4, 2015; 16:00 | Sweden | 1–4 (0–0, 0–2, 1–2) | Russia | Air Canada Centre; Attendance: 15,400 |

Game reference

Linus Söderström
Goalies
Igor Shesterkin
Referees:
(United States) Steve Patafie
(Switzerland) Tobias Wehrli
Linesmen:
(Canada) Bevan Mills
(United States) Judson Ritter

| | 0–1 | 31:18 – A. Sharov (A. Golyshev, A. Dergachyov) |
| | 0–2 | 32:50 – Z. Paigin (R. Valiev, V. Kamenev) (PP) |
| | 0–3 | 41:31 – A. Sharov (V. Bryukvin, M. Mamin) |
| L. Wallmark (A. Brodecki, A. Kempe) – 51:30 | 1–3 |
| | 1–4 | 52:39 – M. Mamin (I. Fishenko, V. Bryukvin) |

8 min
Penalties
16 min
27
Shots
31

| January 4, 2015; 20:00 | Canada | 5–1 (1–0, 2–1, 2–0) | Slovakia | Air Canada Centre; Attendance: 18,002 |

Game reference

Zachary Fucale
Goalies
Denis Godla
Referees:
(Russia) Roman Gofman
(Russia) Konstantin Olenin
Linesmen:
(Russia) Gleb Lazarev
(Sweden) Andreas Malmqvist

| N. Petan (C. McDavid, C. Lazar) (PP) – 04:27 | 1–0 |
| N. Petan (C. McDavid, C. Lazar) – 38:06 | 2–0 |
| S. Theodore (A. Duclair) – 39:32 | 3–0 |
| | 3–1 | 39:57 – D. Šoltés (M. Paulovič) |
| A. Duclair (D. Nurse, S. Reinhart) – 42:47 | 4–1 |
| N. Petan (C. Lazar, C. McDavid) (PP) – 51:59 | 5–1 |

6 min
Penalties
12 min
45
Shots
13

==== Bronze medal game ====
| January 5, 2015; 16:00 | Sweden | 2–4 (2–2, 0–0, 0–2) | Slovakia | Air Canada Centre; Attendance: 13,625 |

Game reference

Linus Söderström
Goalies
Denis Godla
Referees:
(Russia) Roman Gofman
(Russia) Konstantin Olenin
Linesmen:
(Canada) Bevan Mills
(United States) Judson Ritter

| | 0–1 | 02:43 – D. Šoltés (R. Lantoši) |
| | 0–2 | 03:22 – M. Rosandić (P. Skalický, M. Réway) |
| W. Nylander (S. Aho, A. Holmström) – 10:22 | 1–2 |
| J. Lööke (C. Ehn) – 16:12 | 2–2 |
| | 2–3 | 42:52 – P. Skalický (M. Réway, E. Černák) (PP) |
| | 2–4 | 59:04 – P. Koyš (M. Réway) (ENG) |

29 min
Penalties
6 min
28
Shots
28

==== Final ====
| January 5, 2015; 20:00 | Canada | 5–4 (2–1, 3–3, 0–0) | Russia | Air Canada Centre; Attendance: 19,014 |

Game reference

Zachary Fucale
Goalies
Igor Shesterkin
Ilya Sorokin
Referees:
(Sweden) Marcus Vinnerborg
(Switzerland) Tobias Wehrli
Linesmen:
(Czech Republic) Miroslav Lhotský
(Sweden) Andreas Malmqvist

| A. Duclair (M. Domi) – 00:23 | 1–0 |
| N. Paul (B. Point, J. Virtanen) – 02:32 | 2–0 |
| | 2–1 | 09:20 – D. Yudin (A. Golyshev, A. Dergachyov) |
| C. McDavid (J. Morrissey) – 25:08 | 3–1 |
| M. Domi – 27:22 | 4–1 |
| S. Reinhart (M. Domi) – 32:30 | 5–1 |
| | 5–2 | 34:21 – I. Barbashev (P. Buchnevich, D. Yudin) (PP) |
| | 5–3 | 34:53 – S. Tolchinski (N. Goldobin, R. Valiev) |
| | 5–4 | 37:37 – N. Goldobin (S. Tolchinski, V. Kamenev) (PP) |

8 min
Penalties
22 min
21
Shots
30

=== Statistics ===
==== Scoring leaders ====
| Pos | Player | Country | GP | G | A | Pts | +/− | PIM |
|---|---|---|---|---|---|---|---|---|
| 1 | Sam Reinhart | Canada | 7 | 5 | 6 | 11 | +13 | 6 |
| 2 | Nic Petan | Canada | 7 | 4 | 7 | 11 | +4 | 0 |
| 3 | Connor McDavid | Canada | 7 | 3 | 8 | 11 | +8 | 0 |
| 4 | Max Domi | Canada | 7 | 5 | 5 | 10 | +10 | 4 |
| 5 | William Nylander | Sweden | 7 | 3 | 7 | 10 | –2 | 0 |
| 6 | Curtis Lazar | Canada | 7 | 5 | 4 | 9 | +8 | 0 |
| 7 | Oskar Lindblom | Sweden | 7 | 4 | 5 | 9 | –1 | 0 |
| 7 | Martin Réway | Slovakia | 7 | 4 | 5 | 9 | –1 | 2 |
| 9 | Adrian Kempe | Sweden | 6 | 4 | 4 | 8 | 0 | 2 |
| 10 | Anthony Duclair | Canada | 7 | 4 | 4 | 8 | +11 | 16 |

GP = Games played; G = Goals; A = Assists; Pts = Points; +/− = Plus–minus; PIM = Penalties in minutes
Source: IIHF.com

==== Goaltending leaders ====
(minimum 40% team's total ice time)

| Pos | Player | Country | TOI | GA | GAA | Sv% | SO |
|---|---|---|---|---|---|---|---|
| 1 | Zachary Fucale | Canada | 300:00 | 6 | 1.20 | 93.94 | 2 |
| 2 | Igor Shesterkin | Russia | 242:13 | 8 | 1.98 | 93.80 | 1 |
| 3 | Thatcher Demko | United States | 241:42 | 7 | 1.74 | 93.75 | 1 |
| 4 | Denis Godla | Slovakia | 391:35 | 18 | 2.76 | 92.56 | 1 |
| 5 | Ville Husso | Finland | 183:12 | 7 | 2.29 | 92.31 | 1 |

TOI = Time On Ice (minutes:seconds); GA = Goals against; GAA = Goals against average; Sv% = Save percentage; SO = Shutouts
Source: IIHF.com

=== Tournament awards ===
Reference: Most Valuable Player

- Goaltender: (Slovakia) Denis Godla

All-star team

- Goaltender: (Slovakia) Denis Godla
- Defencemen: (Sweden) Gustav Forsling, (Canada) Josh Morrissey
- Forwards: (Canada) Sam Reinhart, (Canada) Max Domi, (Canada) Connor McDavid

IIHF best player awards

- Goaltender: (Slovakia) Denis Godla
- Defenceman: (Russia) Vladislav Gavrikov
- Forward: (Canada) Max Domi

=== Final standings ===
| Rank | Team |
|---|---|
| 1st place, gold medalist(s) | Canada |
| 2nd place, silver medalist(s) | Russia |
| 3rd place, bronze medalist(s) | Slovakia |
| 4th | Sweden |
| 5th | United States |
| 6th | Czech Republic |
| 7th | Finland |
| 8th | Denmark |
| 9th | Switzerland |
| 10th | Germany |

Relegated to the 2016 Division I A

2015 IIHF Junior World champions

Canada
16th title

Note that due to the lack of playoff games for determining the spots 5–8, these spots were determined by the preliminary round records for each team.

== Division I ==
=== Division I A ===
The Division I A tournament was played in Asiago, Italy, from 14 to 20 December 2014.

| Pos | Team | Pld | W | OTW | OTL | L | GF | GA | GD | Pts | Promotion or relegation |
|---|---|---|---|---|---|---|---|---|---|---|---|
| 1 | Belarus | 5 | 4 | 1 | 0 | 0 | 22 | 9 | +13 | 14 | Promoted to the 2016 Top Division |
| 2 | Norway | 5 | 2 | 2 | 0 | 1 | 16 | 11 | +5 | 10 | |
| 3 | Latvia | 5 | 2 | 0 | 1 | 2 | 15 | 11 | +4 | 7 | |
| 4 | Italy (H) | 5 | 1 | 1 | 0 | 3 | 16 | 22 | −6 | 5 | |
| 5 | Austria | 5 | 1 | 0 | 2 | 2 | 21 | 27 | −6 | 5 | |
| 6 | Slovenia | 5 | 1 | 0 | 1 | 3 | 17 | 27 | −10 | 4 | Relegated to the 2016 Division I B |

Source: IIHF
(H) Host

=== Division I B ===
The Division I B tournament was played in Dunaújváros, Hungary, from 14 to 20 December 2014.

| Pos | Team | Pld | W | OTW | OTL | L | GF | GA | GD | Pts | Promotion or relegation |
|---|---|---|---|---|---|---|---|---|---|---|---|
| 1 | Kazakhstan | 5 | 5 | 0 | 0 | 0 | 23 | 9 | +14 | 15 | Promoted to the 2016 Division I A |
| 2 | Ukraine | 5 | 2 | 1 | 0 | 2 | 10 | 11 | −1 | 8 | |
| 3 | Poland | 5 | 2 | 0 | 1 | 2 | 13 | 15 | −2 | 7 | |
| 4 | France | 5 | 2 | 0 | 1 | 2 | 11 | 13 | −2 | 7 | |
| 5 | Japan | 5 | 1 | 1 | 0 | 3 | 15 | 17 | −2 | 5 | |
| 6 | Hungary (H) | 5 | 0 | 1 | 1 | 3 | 9 | 16 | −7 | 3 | Relegated to the 2016 Division II A |

Source: IIHF
(H) Host

== Division II ==
=== Division II A ===
The Division II A tournament was played in Tallinn, Estonia, from 7 to 13 December 2014.

| Pos | Team | Pld | W | OTW | OTL | L | GF | GA | GD | Pts | Promotion or relegation |
|---|---|---|---|---|---|---|---|---|---|---|---|
| 1 | Great Britain | 5 | 4 | 1 | 0 | 0 | 22 | 13 | +9 | 14 | Promoted to the 2016 Division I B |
| 2 | Lithuania | 5 | 2 | 1 | 1 | 1 | 24 | 19 | +5 | 9 | |
| 3 | South Korea | 5 | 2 | 1 | 1 | 1 | 18 | 18 | 0 | 9 | |
| 4 | Netherlands | 5 | 1 | 1 | 0 | 3 | 18 | 16 | +2 | 5 | |
| 5 | Estonia (H) | 5 | 1 | 0 | 1 | 3 | 12 | 22 | −10 | 4 | |
| 6 | Romania | 5 | 1 | 0 | 1 | 3 | 18 | 24 | −6 | 4 | Relegated to the 2016 Division II B |

Source: IIHF
(H) Host

=== Division II B ===
The Division II B tournament was played in Jaca, Spain, from 13 to 19 December 2014.

| Pos | Team | Pld | W | OTW | OTL | L | GF | GA | GD | Pts | Promotion or relegation |
|---|---|---|---|---|---|---|---|---|---|---|---|
| 1 | Croatia | 5 | 5 | 0 | 0 | 0 | 22 | 9 | +13 | 15 | Promoted to the 2016 Division II A |
| 2 | Spain (H) | 5 | 4 | 0 | 0 | 1 | 27 | 10 | +17 | 12 | |
| 3 | Australia | 5 | 2 | 0 | 1 | 2 | 15 | 15 | 0 | 7 | |
| 4 | Belgium | 5 | 1 | 1 | 1 | 2 | 15 | 17 | −2 | 6 | |
| 5 | Serbia | 5 | 1 | 1 | 0 | 3 | 9 | 19 | −10 | 5 | |
| 6 | Iceland | 5 | 0 | 0 | 0 | 5 | 11 | 29 | −18 | 0 | Relegated to the 2016 Division III |

Source: IIHF
(H) Host

== Division III ==
The Division III tournament was played in Dunedin, New Zealand, from 20 to 25 January 2015.

On December 27, 2014 organizers announced that the Bulgarian Ice Hockey Federation withdrew their U20 team from the tournament.

| Pos | Team | Pld | W | OTW | OTL | L | GF | GA | GD | Pts | Promotion |
|---|---|---|---|---|---|---|---|---|---|---|---|
| 1 | China | 4 | 4 | 0 | 0 | 0 | 29 | 3 | +26 | 12 | Promoted to the 2016 Division II B |
| 2 | New Zealand (H) | 4 | 2 | 0 | 1 | 1 | 13 | 11 | +2 | 7 | |
| 3 | Mexico | 4 | 1 | 1 | 0 | 2 | 8 | 10 | −2 | 5 | |
| 4 | South Africa | 4 | 1 | 0 | 0 | 3 | 4 | 22 | −18 | 3 | |
| 5 | Turkey | 4 | 1 | 0 | 0 | 3 | 7 | 15 | −8 | 3 | |

Source: IIHF
(H) Host
