= Mislav Rosandić =

Slovak ice hockey player

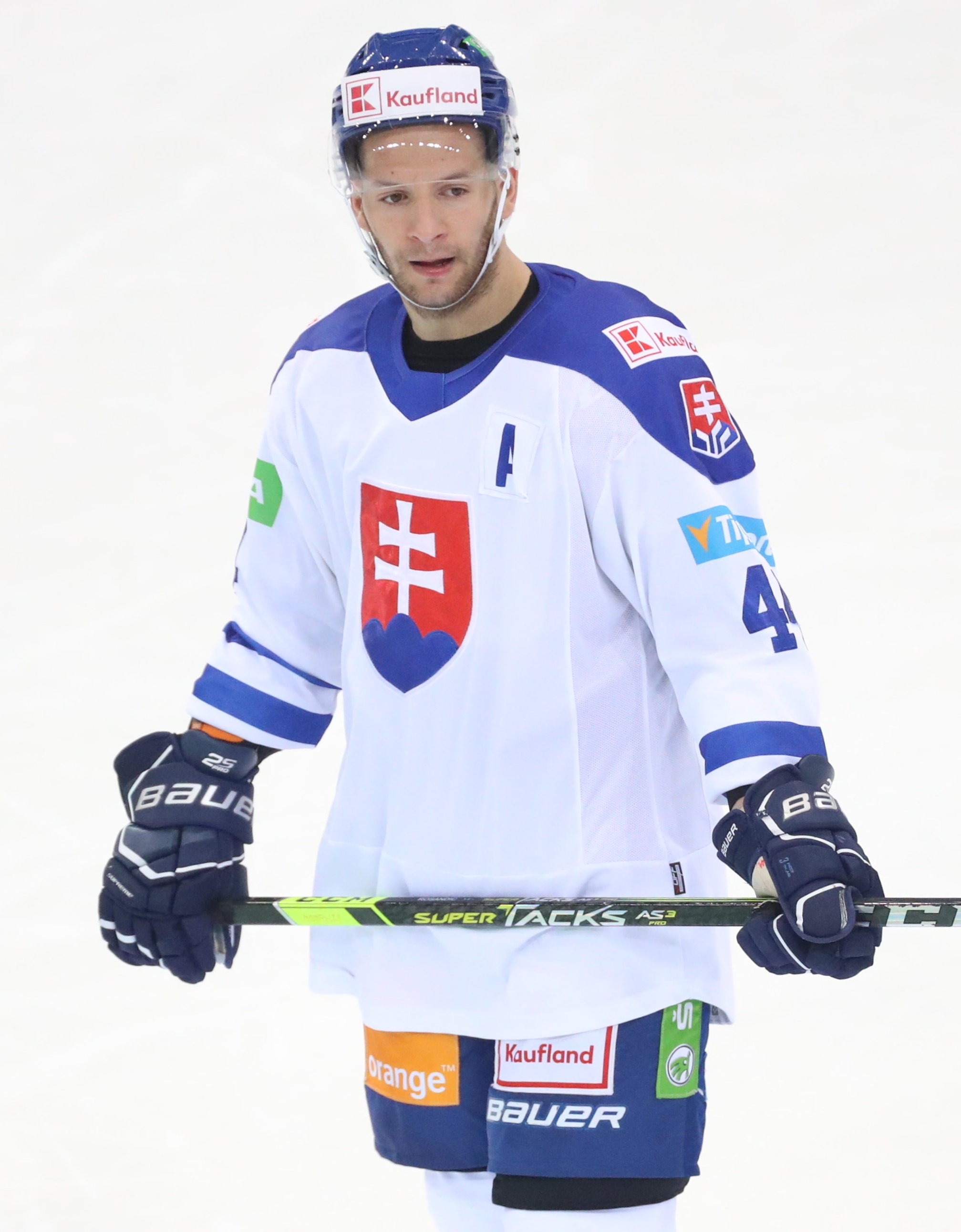
- Rosandić in 2022
- Born: 26 January 1995 (age 31) Zagreb, Croatia
- Height: 5 ft 11 in (180 cm)
- Weight: 176 lb (80 kg; 12 st 8 lb)
- Position: Defence
- Shoots: Left
- Slovak team Former teams: HC Košice; HC '05 Banská Bystrica; HC 07 Detva; HC Slovan Bratislava; Mountfield HK; HC ZUBR Přerov; HC Vítkovice Ridera; HC Bílí Tygři Liberec; Lada Togliatti
- National team: Slovakia
- Playing career: 2012–present

Mislav Rosandić (born 26 January 1995) is a Croatian-born Slovak professional ice hockey player who is a defenceman for HC Košice of the Slovak Extraliga.

== Career statistics ==
=== Regular season and playoffs ===
| | | | Regular season | | | | | Playoffs |
| Season | Team | League | GP | G | A | Pts | PIM | GP | G | A | Pts | PIM |
|---|---|---|---|---|---|---|---|---|---|---|---|---|
| 2010–11 | MHK Dubnica nad Váhom | SVK U18 | 44 | 15 | 30 | 45 | 24 | 2 | 0 | 0 | 0 | 0 |
| 2011–12 | MHK Dubnica nad Váhom | SVK U18 | 39 | 22 | 29 | 51 | 64 | 2 | 1 | 1 | 2 | 0 |
| 2012–13 | HC ’05 Banská Bystrica | SVK U18 | 1 | 0 | 0 | 0 | 2 | — | — | — | — | — |
| 2012–13 | HC ’05 Banská Bystrica | SVK U20 | 33 | 3 | 19 | 22 | 16 | 11 | 2 | 5 | 7 | 2 |
| 2012–13 | HC ’05 Banská Bystrica | SVK | 6 | 0 | 0 | 0 | 2 | 4 | 0 | 0 | 0 | 0 |
| 2012–13 | Team Slovakia U20 | SVK.2 | 12 | 1 | 2 | 3 | 2 | — | — | — | — | — |
| 2013–14 | HC ’05 Banská Bystrica | SVK | 50 | 3 | 5 | 8 | 20 | 11 | 0 | 2 | 2 | 0 |
| 2013–14 | HC 07 Detva | SVK.2 | — | — | — | — | — | 4 | 1 | 1 | 2 | 0 |
| 2014–15 | HC ’05 Banská Bystrica | SVK | 47 | 1 | 6 | 7 | 49 | 18 | 1 | 7 | 8 | 4 |
| 2015–16 | HC ’05 iClinic Banská Bystrica | SVK | 41 | 3 | 8 | 11 | 28 | — | — | — | — | — |
| 2015–16 | HC Slovan Bratislava | KHL | 8 | 0 | 0 | 0 | 2 | 2 | 0 | 0 | 0 | 0 |
| 2016–17 | HC Slovan Bratislava | KHL | 36 | 2 | 5 | 7 | 10 | — | — | — | — | — |
| 2016–17 | HC ’05 iClinic Banská Bystrica | SVK | 12 | 1 | 3 | 4 | 4 | 15 | 2 | 8 | 10 | 8 |
| 2017–18 | Mountfield HK | ELH | 19 | 0 | 3 | 3 | 8 | — | — | — | — | — |
| 2017–18 | HC ZUBR Přerov | CZE.2 | 6 | 1 | 5 | 6 | 0 | 4 | 1 | 0 | 1 | 14 |
| 2017–18 | HC ’05 iClinic Banská Bystrica | SVK | 18 | 1 | 11 | 12 | 20 | — | — | — | — | — |
| 2018–19 | Mountfield HK | ELH | 46 | 5 | 12 | 17 | 24 | — | — | — | — | — |
| 2019–20 | Mountfield HK | ELH | 36 | 3 | 5 | 8 | 12 | — | — | — | — | — |
| 2019–20 | HC Vítkovice Ridera | ELH | 11 | 1 | 2 | 3 | 4 | — | — | — | — | — |
| 2020–21 | Bílí Tygři Liberec | ELH | 52 | 3 | 24 | 27 | 28 | 16 | 0 | 4 | 4 | 12 |
| 2021–22 | Bílí Tygři Liberec | ELH | 44 | 2 | 16 | 18 | 30 | 10 | 2 | 2 | 4 | 8 |
| 2022–23 | Bílí Tygři Liberec | ELH | 15 | 0 | 3 | 3 | 8 | — | — | — | — | — |
| 2022–23 | Mountfield HK | ELH | 32 | 0 | 7 | 7 | 10 | 18 | 1 | 1 | 2 | 14 |
| 2023–24 | Lada Togliatti | KHL | 46 | 1 | 9 | 10 | 52 | 4 | 0 | 0 | 0 | 0 |
| 2024–25 | HC Košice | SVK | 37 | 3 | 10 | 13 | 22 | 19 | 0 | 8 | 8 | 14 |
| 2025–26 | HC Košice | SVK | 52 | 4 | 38 | 42 | 38 | 13 | 4 | 3 | 7 | 10 |
| Slovak totals | | | 263 | 16 | 81 | 97 | 183 | 80 | 7 | 28 | 35 | 36 |
| ELH totals | | | 255 | 14 | 72 | 86 | 124 | 44 | 3 | 7 | 10 | 34 |
| KHL totals | | | 90 | 3 | 14 | 17 | 64 | 6 | 0 | 0 | 0 | 0 |

Medal record

Ice hockey

Representing Slovakia

Olympic Games
| Bronze medal – third place | 2022 Beijing | |

IIHF World U20 Championship
| Bronze medal – third place | 2015 Canada | |

=== International ===
| Year | Team | Event | Result | GP | G | A | Pts | PIM |
|---|---|---|---|---|---|---|---|---|
| 2013 | Slovakia | WJC18 | 9th | 3 | 0 | 0 | 0 | 0 |
| 2015 | Slovakia | WJC | 3rd place, bronze medalist(s) | 7 | 1 | 2 | 3 | 2 |
| 2021 | Slovakia | WC | 8th | 7 | 0 | 1 | 1 | 27 |
| 2022 | Slovakia | OG | 3rd place, bronze medalist(s) | 7 | 0 | 0 | 0 | 4 |
| 2022 | Slovakia | WC | 8th | 8 | 1 | 0 | 1 | 6 |
| 2023 | Slovakia | WC | 9th | 7 | 1 | 1 | 2 | 25 |
| 2025 | Slovakia | WC | 11th | 7 | 1 | 0 | 1 | 4 |
| 2026 | Slovakia | WC | 9th | 7 | 0 | 5 | 5 | 2 |
| Junior totals | | | | 10 | 1 | 2 | 3 | 2 |
| Senior totals | | | | 43 | 3 | 7 | 10 | 68 |

== Awards and honors ==
| Award | Year |
Slovak
| Champion | 2017 |
