= Martin Réway =

Czech-Slovak ice hockey player

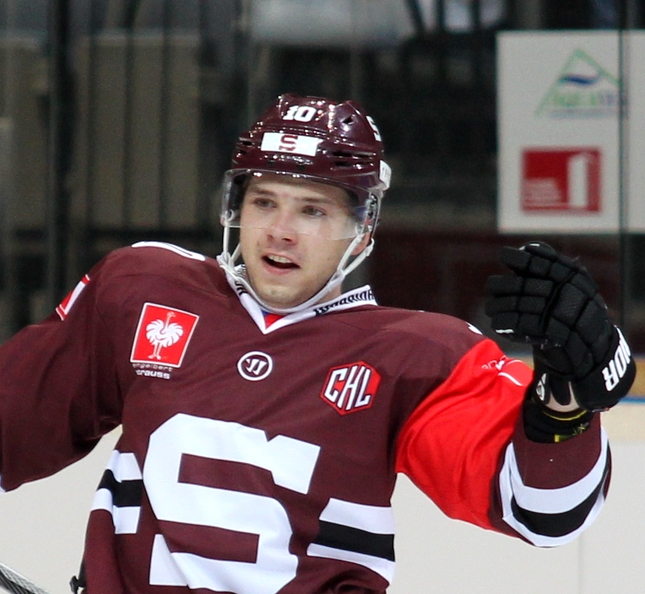
- Born: 24 January 1995 (age 31) Prague, Czech Republic
- Height: 5 ft 8 in (173 cm)
- Weight: 170 lb (77 kg; 12 st 2 lb)
- Position: Center
- Shoots: Left
- Slovak Extraliga team Former teams: Liptovský Mikuláš HK; Sparta Praha; HC Fribourg-Gottéron; HC Slovan Bratislava; Rytíři Kladno; HK Poprad; HC Košice; HK Spišská Nová Ves
- National team: Slovakia
- NHL draft: 116th overall, 2013; Montreal Canadiens
- Playing career: 2014–present

Martin Réway (Slovak pronunciation: [ˈmartin ˈreːʋaj]; born 24 January 1995) is a Czech-born Slovak professional ice hockey forward for Liptovský Mikuláš HK of the Slovak Extraliga. He was selected in the fourth round, 116th overall, by the Montreal Canadiens in the 2013 NHL entry draft.

== Playing career ==
Born in Prague, Réway spent his youth career in Slovakia and with Czech side Sparta Praha, before crossing the Atlantic in 2012. He spent two seasons with the Gatineau Olympiques of the QMJHL in Canada. Réway was selected 116th overall by the Montreal Canadiens in the 2013 NHL entry draft as well as 102nd overall by the HC Slovan Bratislava in the 2012 KHL Junior Draft.

In 2014, Réway returned to Sparta Praha and made his debut with the men's squad in the Czech Extraliga. He started the 2015–16 season with Sparta Praha, but transferred to Fribourg-Gottéron in November 2015. He saw the ice in 19 games of the Swiss National League A (NLA), scoring eight goals while assisting on 13 more.

He signed a three-year entry-level deal with the Montreal Canadiens of the National Hockey League on 18 May 2016. However, he missed the entirety of the 2016–17 season due to injury.

In the following 2017–18 season, Réway made progress in his return to health and was reassigned to begin the year with AHL affiliate, the Laval Rocket. Having appearing in just 5 games over the first month of the season, Réway re-assessed his option and opted to mutually terminate his contract with the Canadiens in order to return home on 29 October 2017. On 8 November 2017, Réway joined Slovak KHL entrant, HC Slovan Bratislava, for the remainder of the season.

Réway returned to playing in the 2018–19 season with hometown club, MHK Dolný Kubín, in the third tier league of Slovakia before agreeing to a one-year contract for the remainder of the year with Swedish outfit, Tingsryds AIF of the HockeyAllsvenskan on 21 November 2018.

In the 2020–21 season, Réway joined fellow Slovak club, HC Košice.

== International play ==
Medal record

Representing Slovakia

Ice hockey

IIHF World U20 Championship
Bronze medal – third place	2015 Canada	

After playing for Slovakia at the U18 and U20 levels, Réway was selected to play for the country's men's national team at the 2014 World Championship and also made the roster for the 2016 World Championship. In 2015, he guided Slovakia's U20 team to a bronze medal at the 2015 World Junior Championships, serving as team captain.

== Career statistics ==
=== Regular season and playoffs ===
			Regular season					Playoffs
Season	Team	League	GP	G	A	Pts	PIM	GP	G	A	Pts	PIM
2008–09	MHK Dolný Kubín	SVK.2 U18	13	8	12	20	10	—	—	—	—	—
2008–09	MHC Martin	SVK U18	2	0	0	0	0	—	—	—	—	—
2009–10	MHK Dolný Kubín	SVK.2 U18	26	32	38	70	24	—	—	—	—	—
2010–11	MHC Mountfield Martin	SVK U18	20	13	22	35	65	—	—	—	—	—
2010–11	MHC Mountfield Martin	SVK U20	10	5	5	10	0	—	—	—	—	—
2011–12	HC Sparta Praha	CZE U18	25	21	39	60	42	9	8	16	24	12
2011–12	HC Sparta Praha	CZE U20	5	2	4	6	2	—	—	—	—	—
2012–13	Gatineau Olympiques	QMJHL	47	22	28	50	56	10	1	11	12	20
2013–14	Gatineau Olympiques	QMJHL	43	20	42	62	48	9	5	10	15	16
2014–15	HC Sparta Praha	ELH	34	9	28	37	54	8	1	6	7	20
2015–16	HC Sparta Praha	ELH	14	5	10	15	6	—	—	—	—	—
2015–16	HC Fribourg–Gottéron	NLA	19	8	13	21	14	—	—	—	—	—
2017–18	Laval Rocket	AHL	5	0	2	2	6	—	—	—	—	—
2017–18	HC Slovan Bratislava	KHL	18	1	4	5	19	—	—	—	—	—
2018–19	MHK Dolný Kubín	Slovak.2	2	0	7	7	0	—	—	—	—	—
2018–19	Tingsryds AIF	Allsv	10	0	2	2	6	—	—	—	—	—
2019–20	Rytíři Kladno	ELH	17	0	6	6	0	—	—	—	—	—
2019–20	HK Poprad	Slovak	7	3	1	4	16	—	—	—	—	—
2020–21	HC Košice	Slovak	39	12	18	30	39	3	0	1	1	6
2021–22	HC RT Torax Poruba	Czech.1	27	4	16	20	14	—	—	—	—	—
2022–23	EHC Freiburg	DEL2	20	6	17	23	4	—	—	—	—	—
2022–23	HK Spišská Nová Ves	Slovak	13	5	8	13	6	13	3	9	12	2
ELH totals			65	14	44	58	60	8	1	6	7	20

=== International ===
Year	Team	Event	Result	GP	G	A	Pts	PIM
2011	Slovakia	U17	10th	3	1	1	2	6
2012	Slovakia	WJC18 D1A	11th	5	4	7	11	8
2013	Slovakia	WJC	8th	6	0	2	2	2
2014	Slovakia	WJC	8th	5	4	6	10	4
2014	Slovakia	WC	9th	7	0	3	3	2
2015	Slovakia	WJC	3rd place, bronze medalist(s)	7	4	5	9	2
2016	Slovakia	WC	9th	7	0	1	1	0
Junior totals				26	13	21	34	22
Senior totals				14	0	4	4	2
