= Denis Godla =

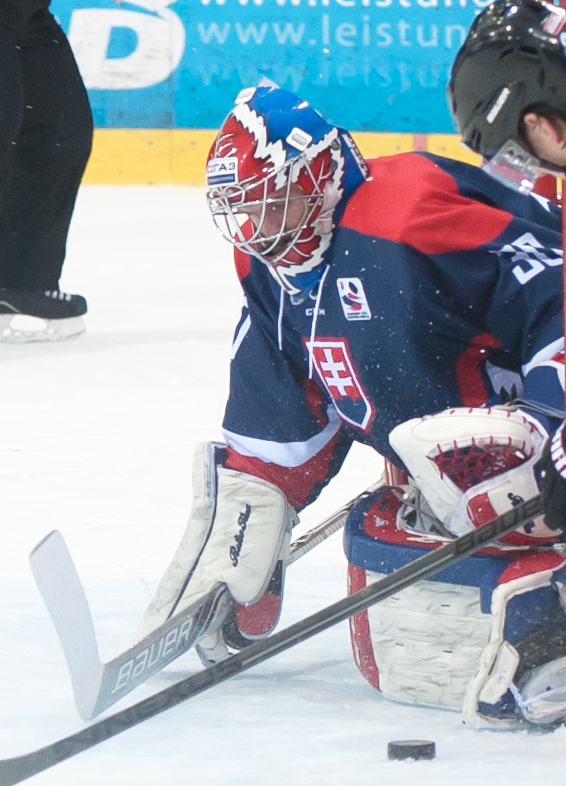
- Born: 4 April 1995 (age 31) Kežmarok, Slovakia
- Height: 5 ft 11 in (180 cm)
- Weight: 176 lb (80 kg; 12 st 8 lb)
- Position: Goaltender
- Catches: Left
- Slovak team Former teams: HK Dukla Michalovce; ŠHK 37 Piešťany; KalPa; HC Kladno; HC Litvínov; HC Slovan Bratislava; HK Spišská Nová Ves
- National team: Slovakia
- NHL draft: Undrafted
- Playing career: 2014–present

Denis Godla (born 4 April 1995) is a Slovak professional ice hockey goaltender who currently plays for HK Dukla Michalovce of the Slovak Extraliga.

Godla was Slovakia's starting goaltender at the 2015 World Junior Ice Hockey Championships where he led the team to a bronze medal, also being named in the tournament's All-Star team, the tournament's best goaltender, and overall tournament MVP. He won the 2018 Spengler Cup with KalPa

== Playing career ==
=== KHL ===
Godla was called up for four games during the 2014-15 KHL season with HC Slovan Bratislava. He struggled during his time there, posting a 0–3–0 record with a .839 save percentage and a 5.17 goals against average.

=== Mestis ===
On September 28, 2015 Godla signed a one-year contract with Kokkolan Hermes of the Finnish Mestis league.

== International play ==
Medal record

Representing Slovakia

Men's ice hockey

World Junior Championships
Bronze medal – third place	2015 Canada	

Godla was first chosen to represent the Slovakia at the 2013 IIHF World U18 Championships. His first game internationally was against Team Canada, where he let in four goals on 35 shots in a 4–1 loss. Godla would suit up twice more in the tournament, a 4–1 loss to Switzerland and a 6–3 loss to Germany, where he was pulled in favour of Dávid Okoličaný.

Godla went on to represent Slovakia again at the 2015 World Junior Ice Hockey Championship. The Slovaks got off to a rough start, losing 8–0 to the powerhouse Canadians, with Godla once again being pulled for Okoličaný. The following day Godla picked up his first international win in a 2–1 upset of defending champion Finland. Godla continued to impress, making 41 saves in a 3–0 loss to the Americans, followed by 28 saves in a 5–2 victory against Germany. Godla's performance was enough to secure Slovakia a 3rd-place finish in Group A, and a spot in the playoff round. In the Quarterfinals Godla picked up his first shutout in international play in a 3–0 over the Czech Republic. The Semi-Finals saw a 5–1 loss to the Canadians, giving them a berth in the bronze medal game against Sweden. Godla came up big once again, making 26 saves in a 4–2 victory to capture the bronze.

His performance earned Godla tournament MVP, a spot on the tournament All-Star team, and the IIHF best goaltender award.

== Career statistics ==
=== Regular season and playoffs ===
			Regular season									Playoffs
Season	Team	League	GP	W	L	T/OT	MIN	GA	SO	GAA	SV%	GP	W	L	MIN	GA	SO	GAA	SV%
2014–15	HC Slovan Bratislava	KHL	4	0	3	0	173	15	0	5.17	.839
2014–15	ŠHK 37 Piešťany	SVK	4				193	10	0	3.10	.922
2015–16	Kokkolan Hermes	Mestis	33							2.76	.917	7						2.62	.908
2016–17	KalPa	Liiga	18	9	2	7			1	2.10	.910	4	2	2			0	1.46	.936
2016–17	IPK	Mestis	6							3.00	.911
2017–18	KalPa	Liiga	34	14	9	11			3	2.26	.913	1	0	1			0	7.42	.769
2018–19	KalPa	Liiga	49	15	21	13			4	2.78	.888
2019–20	Rytíři Kladno	CZE	40	17	23	0			2	3.05	.909
KHL totals			4	0	3	0	173	15	0	5.17	.839	—	—	—	—	—	—	—	—

=== International ===
Year	Team	Event	Result	GP	W	L	MIN	GA	SO	GAA	SV%
2013	Slovakia	WJC18	9th	3	0	3	838	13	0	4.78	.838
2015	Slovakia	WJC	3rd place, bronze medalist(s)	7	4	3	391	18	1	2.76	.926
Junior totals				10	4	6	554	31	1	3.35	.904

== Awards and honours ==
Award	Year
IIHF World U20 Championships Bronze Medal	2015
IIHF World U20 Championships All-Star Team	2015
IIHF World U20 Championships Best Goaltender	2015
IIHF World U20 Championships MVP	2015
