= Maxim Mamin (ice hockey, born 1995) =

Russian ice hockey player (born 1995)

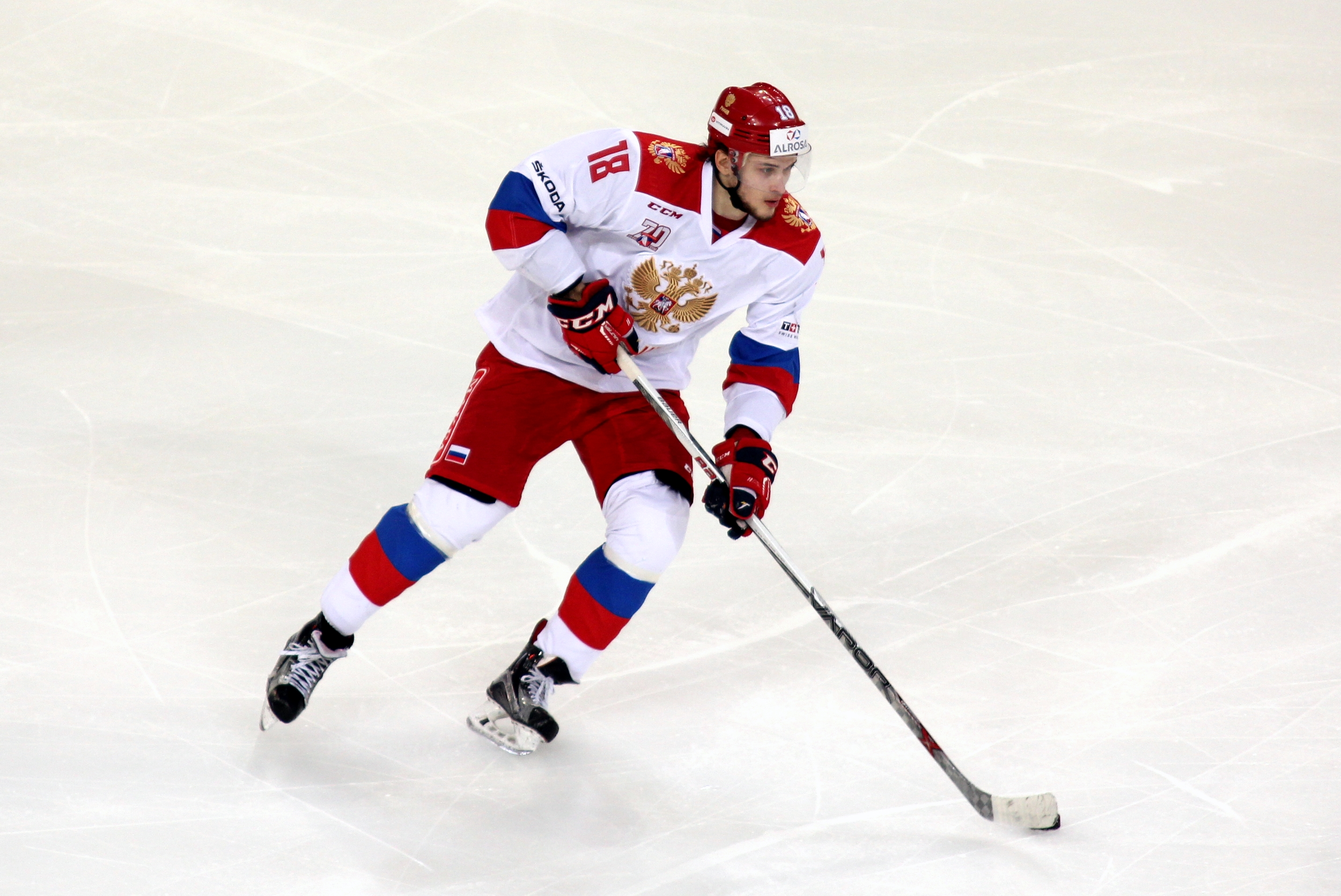
- Mamin with Russia in 2017
- Born: 13 January 1995 (age 31) Moscow, Russia
- Height: 6 ft 2 in (188 cm)
- Weight: 191 lb (87 kg; 13 st 9 lb)
- Position: Forward
- Shoots: Left
- KHL team Former teams: CSKA Moscow; Florida Panthers; Dynamo Moscow
- National team: Russia
- NHL draft: 175th overall, 2016; Florida Panthers
- Playing career: 2015–present

Maxim Vladimirovich Mamin (Russian: Максим Владимирович Maмин; born 13 January 1995) is a Russian professional ice hockey forward currently playing for the HC CSKA Moscow in the Kontinental Hockey League (KHL). He was drafted 175th overall in the 2016 NHL entry draft by the Florida Panthers.

== Playing career ==
He made his professional debut in the Kontinental Hockey League (KHL) with CSKA Moscow during the 2014–15 season. He concluded his rookie campaign with 5 goals and 10 points in 39 games.

On 2 June 2017, Mamin left CSKA and agreed to a two-year, entry-level contract with the Florida Panthers. He was then sent to the Panthers AHL affiliate, the Springfield Thunderbirds. Mamin was called up to the NHL on 1 January 2018. He made his NHL debut on 7 January against the Columbus Blue Jackets before being sent back to the AHL on 12 January. Mamin was recalled on 29 January and he recorded his first NHL goal on 22 February 2018, against the Washington Capitals.

During the 2018–19 season, Mamin appeared in 7 scoreless games with the Panthers. Unable to secure a regular role within the roster, Mamin was loaned by the Panthers to former KHL club, CSKA Moscow, for the remainder of the season on 19 November 2018. Mamim scored 3 points in 25 games with CSKA, however made his biggest impact in the playoffs, scoring the Championship winning goal for CSKA against Avangard Omsk to claim the Gagarin Cup.

On 30 April 2019, as an impending restricted free agent by the Panthers, Mamin opted to continue his second stint with CKSA, signing a two-year contract through 2021.

At the conclusion of his contract with CSKA, having developed into a consistent scoring threat with the club, Mamin opted to return to the NHL in signing a one-year, $975,000 contract with the Panthers on July 28, 2021. In the 2021–22 season, Mamin played in a depth forward role in setting NHL career bests in recording 7 goals and 14 points through 40 regular season games with the Presidents' Trophy winning Panthers.

As a free agent from the Panthers, Mamin opted to return again to Russia in re-joining CSKA Moscow on a three-year contract on 13 July 2022.

On the expiration of his three-year deal with CSKA, Mamin concluded his third stint with the club, after signing a two-year contract with local rival club, Dynamo Moscow on 15 July 2025.

After a lone season with Dynamo, Mamin sought a release and returned to his original club, CSKA Moscow, on a one-year deal on 3 August 2026.

== Career statistics ==
=== Regular season and playoffs ===
			Regular season					Playoffs
Season	Team	League	GP	G	A	Pts	PIM	GP	G	A	Pts	PIM
2011–12	Krasnaya Armiya	MHL	38	1	4	5	12	5	1	0	1	4
2012–13	Krasnaya Armiya	MHL	61	14	15	29	45	—	—	—	—	—
2013–14	Krasnaya Armiya	MHL	49	11	24	35	14	20	5	16	21	0
2014–15	Krasnaya Armiya	MHL	4	1	4	5	2	4	3	4	7	8
2014–15	CSKA Moscow	KHL	39	5	5	10	10	14	0	0	0	27
2015–16	CSKA Moscow	KHL	48	4	3	7	57	19	1	1	2	14
2015–16	Zvezda Chekhov	VHL	5	0	1	1	2	—	—	—	—	—
2016–17	CSKA Moscow	KHL	42	12	13	25	15	9	2	1	3	2
2016–17	Zvezda Chekhov	VHL	4	2	3	5	0	—	—	—	—	—
2017–18	Springfield Thunderbirds	AHL	32	9	16	25	25	—	—	—	—	—
2017–18	Florida Panthers	NHL	26	3	1	4	7	—	—	—	—	—
2018–19	Florida Panthers	NHL	7	0	0	0	5	—	—	—	—	—
2018–19	CSKA Moscow	KHL	25	1	2	3	33	10	2	3	5	4
2018–19	Zvezda Chekhov	VHL	—	—	—	—	—	2	1	1	2	0
2019–20	CSKA Moscow	KHL	51	10	18	28	31	4	1	2	3	2
2020–21	CSKA Moscow	KHL	55	15	20	35	27	22	6	6	12	2
2021–22	Florida Panthers	NHL	40	7	7	14	13	4	0	0	0	0
2021–22	Charlotte Checkers	AHL	7	3	2	5	2	—	—	—	—	—
2022–23	CSKA Moscow	KHL	48	13	20	33	8	24	7	9	16	0
2023–24	CSKA Moscow	KHL	65	19	18	37	18	5	0	0	0	5
2024–25	CSKA Moscow	KHL	61	13	13	26	13	6	0	0	0	6
2025–26	Dynamo Moscow	KHL	56	6	12	18	22	4	0	0	0	2
KHL totals			490	98	124	222	234	117	19	22	41	64
NHL totals			73	10	8	18	25	4	0	0	0	0

=== International ===
Year	Team	Event	Result	GP	G	A	Pts	PI
2012	Russia	U17	1st place, gold medalist(s)	5	0	1	1	0
2012	Russia	IH18	5th	4	1	1	2	0
2015	Russia	WJC	2nd place, silver medalist(s)	7	2	3	5	14
2018	Russia	WC	6th	6	3	0	3	2
Junior totals				16	3	5	8	14
Senior totals				6	3	0	3	2

== Awards and honors ==
Award	Year
KHL
Alexei Cherepanov Trophy	2015
Gagarin Cup (CSKA Moscow)	2019, 2023
