= Alexander Sharov (ice hockey) =

Russian ice hockey player

- Born: November 5, 1995 (age 30) Moscow, Russia
- Height: 6 ft 1 in (185 cm)
- Weight: 183 lb (83 kg; 13 st 1 lb)
- Position: Forward
- Shoots: Right
- KHL team Former teams: Avtomobilist Yekaterinburg; Lada Togliatti; Sibir Novosibirsk; Salavat Yulaev Ufa
- Playing career: 2014–present

Alexander A. Sharov (born November 5, 1995) is a Russian professional ice hockey player. He is currently playing with Avtomobilist Yekaterinburg of the Kontinental Hockey League (KHL).

== Playing career ==
Sharov played as a youth within Krasnaya Armiya in the MHL, before transferring on loan and making his Kontinental Hockey League professional debut playing with HC Lada Togliatti during the 2014–15 KHL season.

In the midst of his second season with Salavat Yulaev Ufa in 2024–25, having contributed with 8 goals and 20 points through 37 appearances, Sharov was traded to Avtomobilist Yekaterinburg on 27 December 2024. He continued his offensive output with Avtomobilist to conclude the season and was re-signed to a three-year contract extension on 21 April 2025.

== Career statistics ==
=== Regular season and playoffs ===
			Regular season					Playoffs
Season	Team	League	GP	G	A	Pts	PIM	GP	G	A	Pts	PIM
2012–13	Krasnaya Armiya	MHL	39	8	11	19	42	—	—	—	—	—
2013–14	Krasnaya Armiya	MHL	41	17	17	34	38	20	6	12	18	10
2014–15	Lada Togliatti	KHL	40	3	4	7	12	—	—	—	—	—
2014–15	Lada Togliatti	MHL	5	1	5	6	6	4	2	4	6	2
2015–16	Zvezda Chekhov	VHL	6	1	1	2	4	—	—	—	—	—
2015–16	Krasnaya Armiya	MHL	5	2	2	4	6	7	1	5	6	2
2016–17	Zvezda Chekhov	VHL	43	7	18	25	18	5	2	1	3	2
2017–18	Sibir Novosibirsk	KHL	56	9	10	19	12	—	—	—	—	—
2018–19	Sibir Novosibirsk	KHL	62	11	15	26	16	—	—	—	—	—
2019–20	Sibir Novosibirsk	KHL	58	14	14	28	19	4	0	4	4	0
2020–21	Sibir Novosibirsk	KHL	58	8	21	29	16	—	—	—	—	—
2021–22	Sibir Novosibirsk	KHL	49	13	9	22	18	5	2	3	5	29
2022–23	Sibir Novosibirsk	KHL	65	29	21	50	20	5	2	3	5	2
2023–24	Salavat Yulaev Ufa	KHL	66	19	33	52	20	6	0	2	2	4
2024–25	Salavat Yulaev Ufa	KHL	37	8	12	20	12	—	—	—	—	—
2024–25	Avtomobilist Yekaterinburg	KHL	31	8	13	21	2	7	4	0	4	12
2025–26	Avtomobilist Yekaterinburg	KHL	62	15	21	36	33	6	2	3	5	6
KHL totals			584	137	173	310	180	33	10	15	25	53

Medal record

Ice hockey

Representing Russia

World Junior Championships
Silver medal – second place	2015 Canada	

=== International ===
Year	Team	Event	Result	GP	G	A	Pts	PIM
2012	Russia	IH18	5th	4	0	0	0	4
2015	Russia	WJC	2nd place, silver medalist(s)	7	4	1	5	6
Junior totals				11	4	1	5	10
