= Alexander Dergachyov =

Russian ice hockey player (born 1996)

- Born: 27 September 1996 (age 30) Langepas, Russia
- Height: 6 ft 4 in (193 cm)
- Weight: 200 lb (91 kg; 14 st 4 lb)
- Position: Centre / Right Wing
- Shoots: Left
- KHL team Former teams: Amur Khabarovsk; SKA Saint Petersburg; Spartak Moscow; HC Vityaz; Avangard Omsk; Neftekhimik Nizhnekamsk
- NHL draft: 74th overall, 2015; Los Angeles Kings
- Playing career: 2015–present

Alexander Viktorovich Dergachyov (Russian: Александр Викторович Дергачёв; born 27 September 1996) is a Russian professional ice hockey player. He is currently playing with Amur Khabarovsk in the Kontinental Hockey League (KHL). He was selected by SKA Saint Petersburg in the 1st round (19th overall) of the 2013 KHL Junior Draft. On 27 June 2015, Alexander was drafted by the NHL's Los Angeles Kings, with the 74th overall pick, in the 2015 NHL entry draft.

== Playing career ==
On 1 June 2020, Dergachyov transferred to his third KHL club, HC Vityaz, for the 2020–21 season. In quickly establishing himself within Vityaz, Dergachyov broke out offensively to record career best marks of 11 goals, 12 assists for 23 points through 53 regular season games.

On 26 May 2021, Dergachyov was traded by Vityaz to newly crowned KHL champions, Avangard Omsk, in exchange for prospect Alexander Yaremchuk and the rights to Oliver Kylington. He was signed to an improved two-year contract to start his tenure with Avangard.

As a free agent from Avangard, Dergachyov was signed to a one-year contract for the 2023–24 season with HC Neftekhimik Nizhnekamsk on 21 July 2023.

Following three seasons with Nizhnekamsk, Dergachyov was signed as a free agent to a one-year contract with Amur Khabarovsk on 2 June 2026.

== International play ==
Dergachyov competed with the Russia men's national under-18 ice hockey team at the 2014 IIHF World U18 Championships, and was a member of the Russian Selects for the 2014 Subway Super Series held in Canada. As an 18-year-old, he help helped the Russia men's national junior ice hockey team capture silver at the 2015 World Junior Ice Hockey Championship.

== Career statistics ==
=== Regular season and playoffs ===
			Regular season					Playoffs
Season	Team	League	GP	G	A	Pts	PIM	GP	G	A	Pts	PIM
2012–13	Sputnik Almetievsk	MHLB	12	1	1	2	24	7	0	2	2	4
2013–14	SKA-1946	MHL	46	12	9	21	30	10	1	1	2	2
2014–15	SKA-1946	MHL	45	10	29	39	52	19	11	7	18	10
2015–16	SKA Saint Petersburg	KHL	33	2	0	2	4	15	0	1	1	4
2015–16	SKA-Neva	VHL	2	0	0	0	0	—	—	—	—	—
2015–16	SKA-1946	MHL	1	1	0	1	0	—	—	—	—	—
2016–17	SKA Saint Petersburg	KHL	31	0	3	3	24	9	0	0	0	27
2016–17	SKA-Neva	VHL	3	2	0	2	4	8	1	2	3	4
2017–18	SKA Saint Petersburg	KHL	5	1	1	2	4	—	—	—	—	—
2017–18	SKA-Neva	VHL	2	0	0	0	0	—	—	—	—	—
2017–18	Spartak Moscow	KHL	31	6	5	11	8	4	0	0	0	2
2018–19	SKA Saint Petersburg	KHL	31	5	2	7	28	4	0	0	0	2
2019–20	SKA Saint Petersburg	KHL	26	1	2	3	6	—	—	—	—	—
2019–20	SKA-Neva	VHL	4	1	0	1	2	10	3	5	8	12
2020–21	HC Vityaz	KHL	53	11	12	23	22	—	—	—	—	—
2021–22	Avangard Omsk	KHL	25	3	5	8	4	—	—	—	—	—
2021–22	Omskie Krylia	VHL	3	1	1	2	0	—	—	—	—	—
2022–23	Avangard Omsk	KHL	60	7	8	15	18	14	0	0	0	4
2022–23	Omskie Krylia	VHL	2	0	1	1	2	—	—	—	—	—
2023–24	Neftekhimik Nizhnekamsk	KHL	66	18	16	34	34	—	—	—	—	—
2024–25	Neftekhimik Nizhnekamsk	KHL	15	3	5	8	4	—	—	—	—	—
2025–26	Neftekhimik Nizhnekamsk	KHL	44	3	14	17	23	5	0	0	0	6
KHL totals			420	60	73	133	179	51	0	1	1	45

=== International ===
Year	Team	Event	Result	GP	G	A	Pts	PIM
2014	Russia	WJC18	5th	5	0	0	0	0
2015	Russia	WJC	2nd place, silver medalist(s)	7	1	3	4	2
2016	Russia	WJC	2nd place, silver medalist(s)	7	0	2	2	2
Junior totals				19	1	5	6	4

== Awards and honors ==
Award	Year
KHL
Gagarin Cup (SKA Saint Petersburg)	2017
International
IIHF World U18 Championship Team Russia	2014
Subway Super Series Russian Selects	2014
2015 World Junior Ice Hockey Championship Silver Medal	2015
2016 World Junior Ice Hockey Championship Silver Medal	2016
