= Mirco Müller =

Swiss ice hockey player (born 1995)

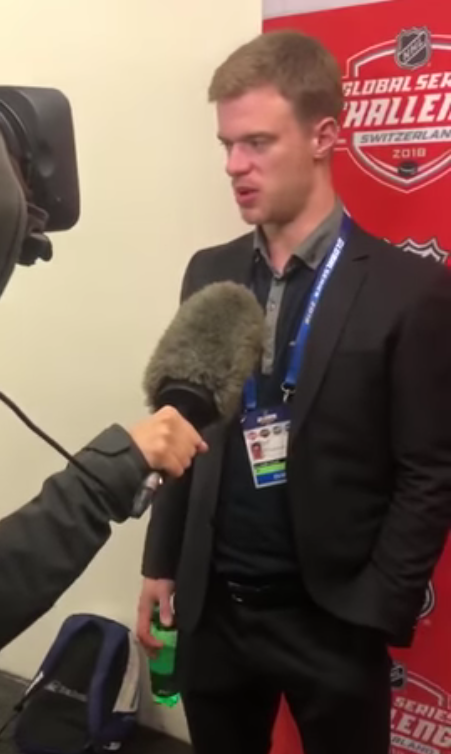
- Müller in 2018
- Born: 21 March 1995 (age 31) Winterthur, Switzerland
- Height: 6 ft 3 in (191 cm)
- Weight: 210 lb (95 kg; 15 st 0 lb)
- Position: Defence
- Shoots: Left
- NL team Former teams: HC Lugano; Kloten Flyers; San Jose Sharks; New Jersey Devils; Leksands IF
- National team: Switzerland
- NHL draft: 18th overall, 2013; San Jose Sharks
- Playing career: 2012–present

Mirco Müller (also spelled Mirco Mueller; born 21 March 1995) is a Swiss professional ice hockey player who is a defenceman for HC Lugano of the National League (NL). He previously played in the National Hockey League (NHL) with the San Jose Sharks and the New Jersey Devils from 2014 to 2020. The Sharks selected Müller in the first round (18th overall) of the 2013 NHL entry draft.

== Playing career ==
As a youth, Müller played in the 2008 Quebec International Pee-Wee Hockey Tournament with the Swiss Eastern team.

Müller played for the Kloten Flyers organization between 2010 and 2012, mostly at the junior level. During the 2011–12 season, Müller played seven games in the National League A.

Müller was selected 11th overall by the Everett Silvertips in the 2012 Canadian Hockey League import draft. "Over the last few years, a couple Swiss players played in North America, and they told me how high the playing level is there and I’ve always been interested to play in another country, so I was very happy to be picked by Everett," said Müller.

Müller was selected in the first round, 18th overall, by the San Jose Sharks in the 2013 NHL entry draft, and on 22 September 2013, he signed a three-year, entry-level contract with the Sharks, and returned to Everett. He did not play any exhibition games with the Sharks in 2013 due to an injury.

On 17 June 2017, Müller (along with a fifth-round pick in the 2017 NHL entry draft) was traded to the New Jersey Devils in exchange for a second and a fourth-round pick in the same draft. On 27 February 2019, Müller was stretchered off the ice due to an injury sustained in a New Jersey home game against the Calgary Flames.

On 1 February 2021, Müller signed a one-year contract with Leksands IF of the Swedish Hockey League (SHL).

== International play ==
Medal record

Representing Switzerland

Ice hockey

World Championships
Silver medal – second place	2018 Denmark	

Müller played for Switzerland in the 2013 World Junior Ice Hockey Championships in Ufa, Russia. Ahead of the tournament, Müller said, "I'm looking forward to playing against the best players in junior hockey, especially the Canadians, Americans, Swedes and the other top nations. It's in a new country that I've never been to before, and I'm excited to see what it's like over there."

== Personal life ==
Müller is the older brother of hockey player Alina Müller, a forward who plays for Boston in the PWHL and formerly played internationally for the Switzerland women's national ice hockey team.

== Career statistics ==
=== Regular season and playoffs ===
			Regular season					Playoffs
Season	Team	League	GP	G	A	Pts	PIM	GP	G	A	Pts	PIM
2010–11	Kloten Flyers	SUI U17	32	12	19	31	14	10	0	6	6	12
2010–11	Kloten Flyers	SUI U20	1	0	0	0	0	—	—	—	—	—
2011–12	Kloten Flyers	SUI U17	4	1	3	4	0	—	—	—	—	—
2011–12	Kloten Flyers	SUI U20	26	3	3	6	8	4	1	2	3	2
2011–12	Kloten Flyers	NLA	7	1	0	1	0	—	—	—	—	—
2012–13	Everett Silvertips	WHL	63	6	25	31	57	6	0	1	1	6
2013–14	Everett Silvertips	WHL	60	5	22	27	31	5	1	1	2	4
2013–14	Worcester Sharks	AHL	9	0	2	2	2	—	—	—	—	—
2014–15	San Jose Sharks	NHL	39	1	3	4	10	—	—	—	—	—
2014–15	Worcester Sharks	AHL	3	1	0	1	4	—	—	—	—	—
2015–16	San Jose Sharks	NHL	11	0	0	0	7	—	—	—	—	—
2015–16	San Jose Barracuda	AHL	50	1	10	11	35	4	0	0	0	4
2016–17	San Jose Sharks	NHL	4	1	1	2	0	—	—	—	—	—
2016–17	San Jose Barracuda	AHL	62	2	18	20	22	15	0	5	5	6
2017–18	New Jersey Devils	NHL	28	0	4	4	4	3	0	0	0	0
2017–18	Binghamton Devils	AHL	2	0	0	0	2	—	—	—	—	—
2018–19	New Jersey Devils	NHL	53	1	10	11	17	—	—	—	—	—
2019–20	New Jersey Devils	NHL	50	2	5	7	23	—	—	—	—	—
2020–21	Leksands IF	SHL	13	4	3	7	14	3	0	0	0	0
2021–22	HC Lugano	NL	50	3	15	18	36	4	0	0	0	6
2022–23	HC Lugano	NL	52	0	14	14	20	8	0	1	1	6
2023–24	HC Lugano	NL	51	1	12	13	33	9	0	6	6	16
2024–25	HC Lugano	NL	37	2	7	9	22	—	—	—	—	—
2025–26	HC Lugano	NL	46	3	16	19	6	4	0	0	0	2
NHL totals			185	5	23	28	61	3	0	0	0	0
NL totals			243	10	64	74	117	25	0	7	7	30

=== International ===
Year	Team	Event	GP	G	A	Pts	PIM
2011	Switzerland	IH18	4	0	2	2	0
2013	Switzerland	WJC	6	0	2	2	6
2013	Switzerland	WJC18	5	1	2	3	2
2014	Switzerland	WJC	5	1	1	2	14
2015	Switzerland	WJC	6	0	1	1	6
2018	Switzerland	WC	10	1	5	6	8
2021	Switzerland	WC	5	0	1	1	14
2022	Switzerland	OG	5	0	0	0	4
Junior totals			26	2	8	10	28
Senior totals			20	1	6	7	26

Awards and achievements
Preceded by Tomáš Hertl	San Jose Sharks first-round draft pick 2013	Succeeded by Nikolay Goldobin
