= Sebastian Aho (ice hockey, born 1996) =

Swedish ice hockey player (born 1996)

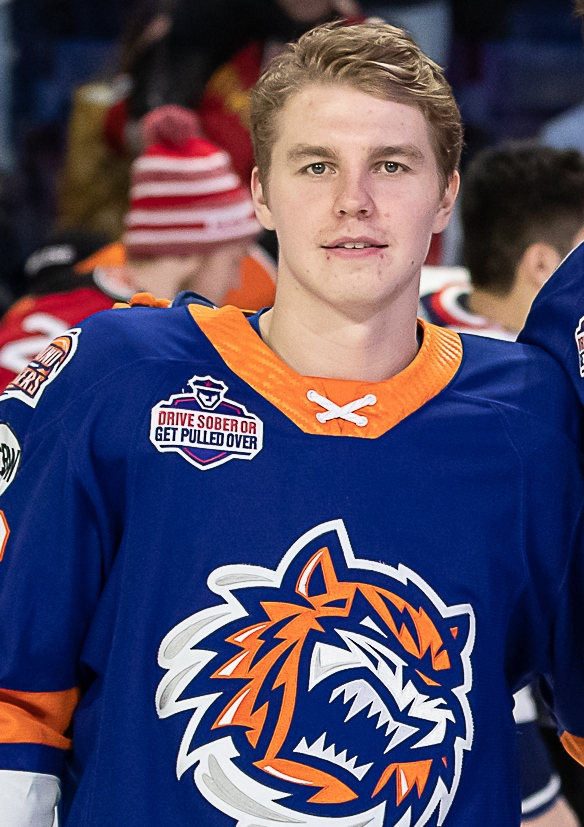
- Aho with the Bridgeport Sound Tigers in 2019
- Born: 17 February 1996 (age 30) Umeå, Sweden
- Height: 5 ft 10 in (178 cm)
- Weight: 180 lb (82 kg; 12 st 12 lb)
- Position: Defence
- Shoots: Left
- SHL team Former teams: Växjö Lakers; Skellefteå AIK; New York Islanders
- NHL draft: 139th overall, 2017; New York Islanders
- Playing career: 2013–present

Sebastian Johannes Aho (born 17 February 1996) is a Swedish professional ice hockey player who is a defenceman for the Växjö Lakers of the Swedish Hockey League (SHL). Aho was drafted by the New York Islanders, 139th overall, in the 2017 NHL entry draft.

== Playing career ==
=== SHL ===
Aho played as a youth with IF Björklöven before moving the fellow Swedish club Skellefteå AIK. Aho made his Elitserien debut on the blueline in 1 game with Skellefteå AIK during the 2012–13 season. He was signed to a new four-year contract with the club on Tuesday, 28 May 2013.

After helping Skellefteå AIK claim a second straight championship, Aho was rated amongst the top 10 European skaters for the 2014 NHL entry draft. Despite this, Aho was passed over due to his diminutive size and returned to continue with Skellefteå AIK. After his first full SHL season in 2014–15, helping the club return to the finals for the third-consecutive season with 9 points in 41 games, Aho was again rated amongst the top 15 skaters for the 2015 NHL entry draft.

=== New York Islanders ===
Aho was eventually drafted in his fourth eligible draft as an average prospect by the New York Islanders in the fifth round, 139th overall, of the 2017 NHL entry draft on 24 June 2017. He agreed to a three-year entry-level contract with the Islanders on 5 July 2017. Aho was assigned to the Islanders' American Hockey League (AHL) affiliate, the Bridgeport Sound Tigers to begin the 2017–18 season after attending training camp. He was recalled to the NHL on 28 December, and played his first NHL game in a 6–1 loss against the Colorado Avalanche on 31 December. He scored his first NHL goal in a 5–4 win over the New Jersey Devils on 7 January 2018.

After attending the Islanders training camp prior to the 2018–19 season, Aho was assigned to the Sound Tigers. On 3 January 2019, Aho and teammate Michael Dal Colle were selected to represent the Sound Tigers at the 2019 AHL All-Star Classic.

=== Pittsburgh Penguins ===
Following seven seasons within the Islanders organization, Aho left as a free agent and was signed to a two-year, $1.55 million contract with the Pittsburgh Penguins on July 2, 2024.

=== Växjö Lakers HC ===
After two seasons within the Penguins organization, having never featured at the NHL with Pittsburgh, Aho left the club as a pending free agent and opted to return to Europe in signing a two-year contract with Swedish club, Växjö Lakers HC of the SHL, on 14 June 2026.

== Personal life ==
He is of Finnish descent through his father. Finnish coach Tuomas Tuokkola and Finnish goaltender Pekka Tuokkola are his cousins.

== Career statistics ==
=== Regular season and playoffs ===
			Regular season					Playoffs
Season	Team	League	GP	G	A	Pts	PIM	GP	G	A	Pts	PIM
2010–11	IF Björklöven	J18	20	3	6	9	12	—	—	—	—	—
2010–11	IF Björklöven	J18 Allsv	7	0	0	0	4	—	—	—	—	—
2011–12	Skellefteå AIK	J18	16	1	12	13	2	—	—	—	—	—
2011–12	Skellefteå AIK	J18 Allsv	17	3	2	5	10	7	0	2	2	2
2012–13	Skellefteå AIK	J18 Allsv	2	0	2	2	0	3	0	1	1	2
2012–13	Skellefteå AIK	J20	38	1	11	12	14	4	0	0	0	0
2012–13	Skellefteå AIK	SEL	1	0	0	0	0	—	—	—	—	—
2013–14	Skellefteå AIK	J20	27	7	16	23	18	—	—	—	—	—
2013–14	Skellefteå AIK	SHL	21	1	4	5	2	13	0	0	0	0
2014–15	Skellefteå AIK	J20	4	0	2	2	4	—	—	—	—	—
2014–15	Skellefteå AIK	SHL	41	1	8	9	14	13	1	3	4	8
2015–16	Skellefteå AIK	SHL	39	3	13	16	12	16	3	4	7	6
2016–17	Skellefteå AIK	SHL	50	10	20	30	10	7	0	2	2	0
2017–18	Bridgeport Sound Tigers	AHL	40	9	20	29	20	—	—	—	—	—
2017–18	New York Islanders	NHL	22	1	3	4	6	—	—	—	—	—
2018–19	Bridgeport Sound Tigers	AHL	67	9	37	46	36	5	0	2	2	6
2019–20	Bridgeport Sound Tigers	AHL	49	3	27	30	18	—	—	—	—	—
2020–21	New York Islanders	NHL	3	1	1	2	2	—	—	—	—	—
2021–22	New York Islanders	NHL	36	2	10	12	10	—	—	—	—	—
2022–23	New York Islanders	NHL	71	5	18	23	22	6	0	1	1	2
2023–24	New York Islanders	NHL	58	2	7	9	12	—	—	—	—	—
2024–25	Wilkes-Barre/Scranton Penguins	AHL	27	0	14	14	8	2	0	0	0	2
2025–26	Wilkes-Barre/Scranton Penguins	AHL	29	2	12	14	18	8	0	1	1	2
SHL totals			152	15	45	60	38	49	4	9	13	14
NHL totals			190	11	39	50	52	6	0	1	1	2

=== International ===
Year	Team	Event	Result	GP	G	A	Pts	PIM
2013	Sweden	U17	1st place, gold medalist(s)	6	0	4	4	14
2013	Sweden	WJC18	5th	5	0	0	0	4
2013	Sweden	IH18	7th	2	0	0	0	0
2014	Sweden	WJC18	4th	4	2	0	2	8
2015	Sweden	WJC	4th	7	1	3	4	2
Junior totals				24	3	7	10	28

== Awards and honors ==
Award	Year	Ref
SHL
Le Mat Trophy champion	2014	
AHL
All-Star Game	2018, 2019, 2020	
