= Rinat Valiev =

Russian ice hockey player (born 1995)

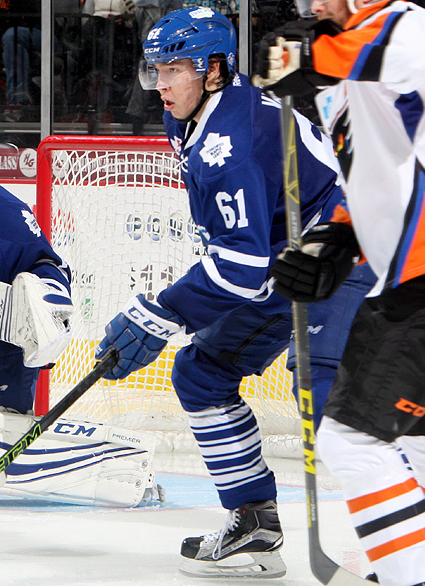
- Valiev with the Toronto Marlies in 2015
- Born: May 11, 1995 (age 31) Nizhnekamsk, Russia
- Height: 6 ft 1 in (185 cm)
- Weight: 196 lb (89 kg; 14 st 0 lb)
- Position: Defence
- Shoots: Left
- KAZ team Former teams: HC Almaty; Toronto Maple Leafs; Montreal Canadiens; Ak Bars Kazan; Dinamo Minsk; Admiral Vladivostok
- NHL draft: 68th overall, 2014; Toronto Maple Leafs
- Playing career: 2015–present

Rinat Valiev (born May 11, 1995) is a Russian professional ice hockey defenceman who is currently playing under contract with HC Almaty of the Pro Hokei Ligasy (KAZ). Valiev was selected in the third round (68th overall) of the 2014 NHL entry draft by the Toronto Maple Leafs.

== Playing career ==
Valiev was selected in the 1st round (3rd overall) of the 2012 KHL Junior Draft by Ak Bars Kazan. After parts of two seasons with junior affiliate, Bars Kazan, he relocated to North America and played the 2012–13 season with the Indiana Ice of the United States Hockey League.

After his draft selection to the Maple Leafs, Valiev was promptly signed to a three-year entry-level contract on July 10, 2014. Following his second season within the Kootenay Ice organization of the Western Hockey League, Valiev made his professional debut after the 2014–15 season, playing in 2 games with the Maple Leafs AHL affiliate, the Toronto Marlies.

During the 2015–16 season, behind the back of enjoying a solid season in his return to the Marlies, Valiev received his first NHL recall on March 11, 2016. He made his NHL debut with the Maple Leafs in a 4–0 defeat to the Ottawa Senators on March 12, 2016.

On February 25, 2018, one day before the trade deadline, Valiev was traded by the Maple Leafs, alongside teammate Kerby Rychel and a second-round pick in 2018 NHL entry draft to the Montreal Canadiens in exchange for Tomáš Plekanec and minor league forward Kyle Baun. On May 31, Valiev signed a one-year, two-way contract extension with the Canadiens.

Before the 2018–19 season, on October 1, 2018, Valiev was traded by the Canadiens alongside teammate Matt Taormina to the Calgary Flames in exchange for Brett Kulak.

Following two seasons within the Flames organization assigned to AHL affiliate, the Stockton Heat, Valiev sat out the shortened and pandemic-delayed 2020–21 season as a free agent.

On 5 July 2021, Valiev returned to the professional ranks in securing a try-out contract with his original Russian club, Ak Bars Kazan of the KHL. After a successful pre-season, Valiev secured a one-year contract for the 2021–22 season with Ak Bars on 26 August 2021. Valiev made one appearance with Ak Bars, playing the majority of his contract with VHL club, Bars Kazan, before he was traded to Belarusian KHL club, HC Dinamo Minsk, in exchange for the rights to Julius Honka on 27 December 2021.

On 5 July 2022, Valiev continued his tenure in the KHL, joining Admiral Vladivostok on a two-year contract.

== Career statistics ==
=== Regular season and playoffs ===
			Regular season					Playoffs
Season	Team	League	GP	G	A	Pts	PIM	GP	G	A	Pts	PIM
2011–12	Bars Kazan	MHL	15	1	1	2	10	1	1	0	1	0
2012–13	Bars Kazan	MHL	6	0	0	0	0	—	—	—	—	—
2012–13	Indiana Ice	USHL	36	6	7	13	43	—	—	—	—	—
2013–14	Kootenay Ice	WHL	55	5	23	28	68	13	1	8	9	16
2014–15	Kootenay Ice	WHL	52	9	37	46	53	7	3	2	5	0
2014–15	Toronto Marlies	AHL	2	0	0	0	0	—	—	—	—	—
2015–16	Toronto Marlies	AHL	60	4	19	23	30	12	0	0	0	4
2015–16	Toronto Maple Leafs	NHL	10	0	0	0	0	—	—	—	—	—
2016–17	Toronto Marlies	AHL	47	3	10	13	79	9	0	1	1	10
2017–18	Toronto Marlies	AHL	40	5	10	15	26	—	—	—	—	—
2017–18	Laval Rocket	AHL	5	1	2	3	2	—	—	—	—	—
2017–18	Montreal Canadiens	NHL	2	0	0	0	2	—	—	—	—	—
2018–19	Stockton Heat	AHL	57	4	17	21	51	—	—	—	—	—
2019–20	Stockton Heat	AHL	49	2	8	10	28	—	—	—	—	—
2021–22	Bars Kazan	VHL	23	1	8	9	18	—	—	—	—	—
2021–22	Ak Bars Kazan	KHL	1	0	0	0	0	—	—	—	—	—
2021–22	Dinamo Minsk	KHL	2	0	0	0	0	—	—	—	—	—
2022–23	Admiral Vladivostok	KHL	18	0	2	2	4	—	—	—	—	—
2023–24	Neftyanik Almetievsk	VHL	4	0	0	0	4	—	—	—	—	—
2023–24	Humo Tashkent	KAZ	12	1	2	3	8	—	—	—	—	—
NHL totals			12	0	0	0	2	—	—	—	—	—
KHL totals			21	0	2	2	4	—	—	—	—	—

Medal record

Representing Russia

Ice hockey

World Junior Championships
Silver medal – second place	2015 Canada	

=== International ===
Year	Team	Event	Result	GP	G	A	Pts	PIM
2012	Russia	IH18	5th	4	2	1	3	0
2015	Russia	WJC	2nd place, silver medalist(s)	7	0	3	3	6
Junior totals				11	2	4	6	6
