= Miroslav Svoboda (ice hockey) =

Czech ice hockey player

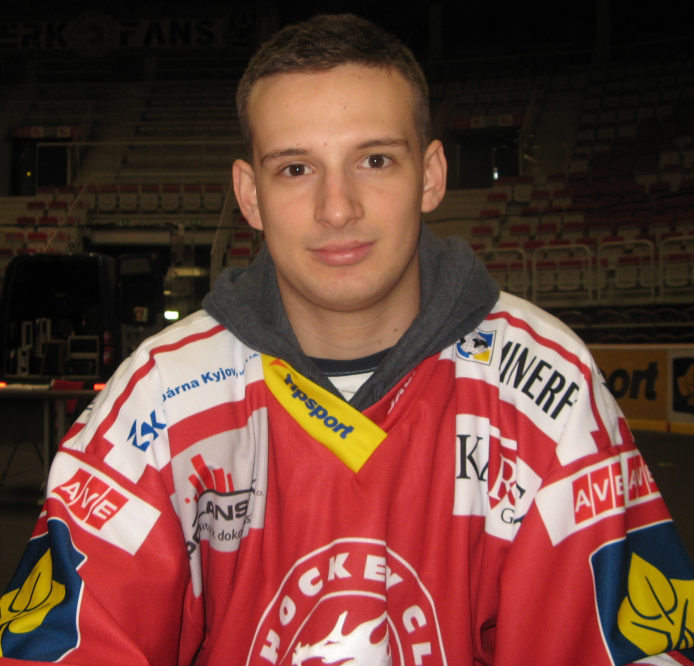
- Svoboda with HC Oceláři Třinec in 2015
- Born: 7 March 1995 (age 31) Vsetín, Czech Republic
- Height: 6 ft 3 in (191 cm)
- Weight: 176 lb (80 kg; 12 st 8 lb)
- Position: Goaltender
- Catches: Left
- Liiga team Former teams: Vaasan Sport; HC Oceláři Třinec; AZ Havířov; Draci Šumperk; HC Dukla Jihlava; HC Škoda Plzeň; Dornbirner EC; HC Vítkovice Ridera
- NHL draft: 208th overall, 2015; Edmonton Oilers
- Playing career: 2014–present

Miroslav Svoboda (born 7 March 1995) is a Czech professional ice hockey goaltender who is currently playing under contract with Vaasan Sport of the Liiga. Svoboda was selected by the Edmonton Oilers in the 7th round (208th overall) of the 2015 NHL entry draft.

== Playing career ==
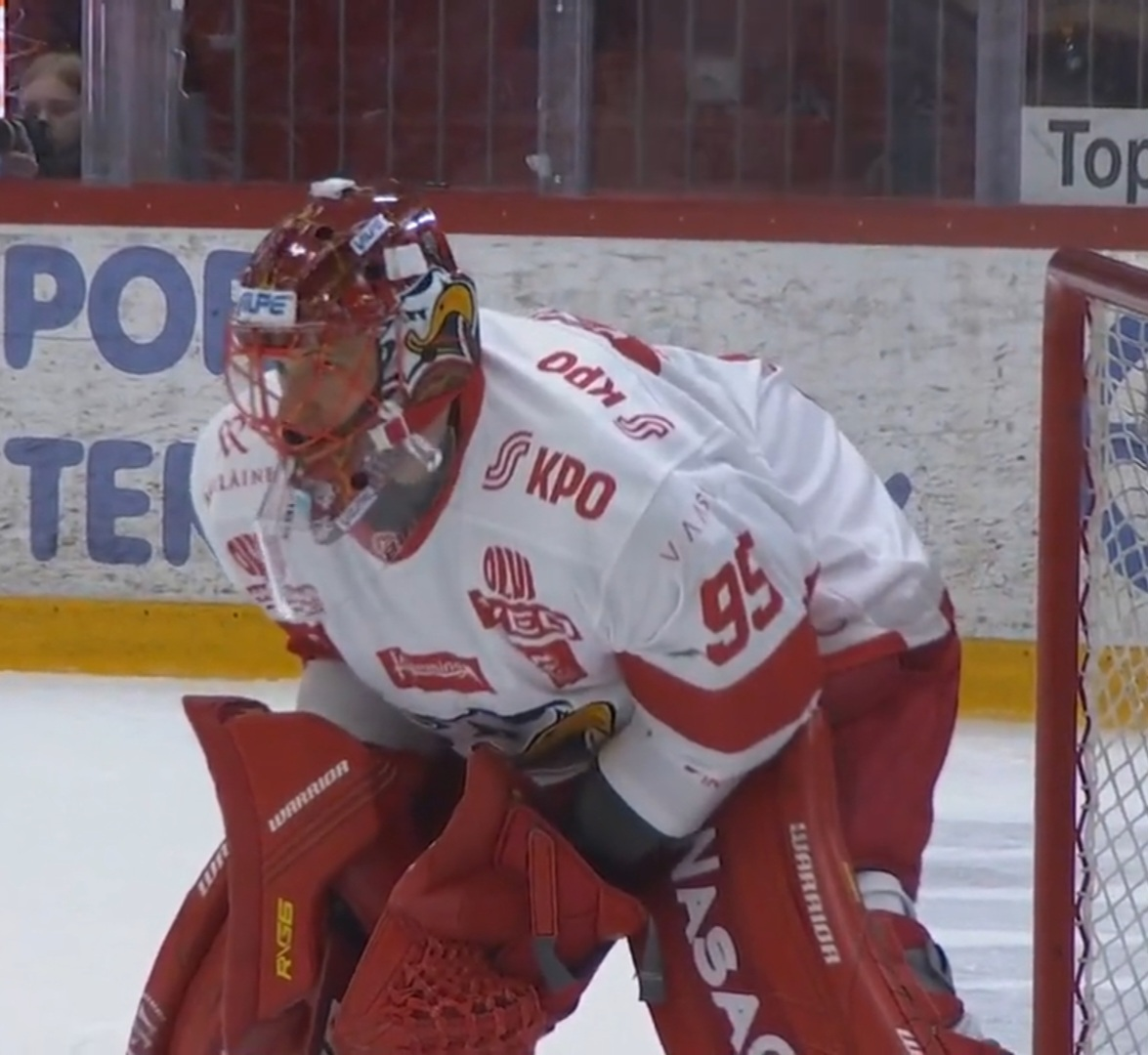
Svoboda with the Vaasan Sport in 2024

Svoboda made his Czech Extraliga debut playing with HC Oceláři Třinec debut during the 2014–15 season. During the 2016–17 season, Svoboda played the entirety of the year on loan with second-tier club, HC Dukla Jihlava, backstopping the club to promotion back to the Extraliga. On 25 April 2017, Svoboda opted to leave Trinec for a starting role in agreeing to a two-year contract with HC Plzeň.

On 26 April 2018, he signed with the Nashville Predators of the National Hockey League (NHL). After attending the Predators training camp, Svoboda was reassigned to primary affiliate, the Milwaukee Admirals. With the logjam in the Admirals, Svoboda was reassigned to begin the 2018–19 with secondary ECHL affiliate, the Atlanta Gladiators. On 20 October 2018, he was recalled to the Nashville Predators to replace the injured Pekka Rinne. He was returned to the Admirals on 22 October 2018. Svoboda never made an appearance in the AHL, featuring in 14 games in the ECHL before opting to be placed on unconditional waivers by the Predators in order to mutually terminate his contract on 9 January 2019.

As a free agent, on 13 January 2019, Svoboda opted to play out the remainder of the season in Finland, joining top flight Liiga club, Tappara. Before making an appearance with Tappara, Svoboda was loaned to Mestis club, LeKi, on 18 January 2019. After 6 games he left his contract with Tappara, playing out the remainder of the season with Austrian club, Dornbirner EC of the Austrian Hockey League (EBEL).

On 5 March 2019, Svoboda decided to return for the following 2019–20 season to the Czech Extraliga, agreeing on a one-year contract with HC Vítkovice Ridera.

== International ==
Year	Team	Event	GP	W	L	T	MIN	GA	SO	GAA	SV%
2015	Czech Republic	WJC	2	1	1	—	118:58	3	0	1.51	.942
Junior totals			2	1	1	—	118:58	3	0	1.51	.942
