= Nikolay Goldobin =

Russian ice hockey player (born 1995)

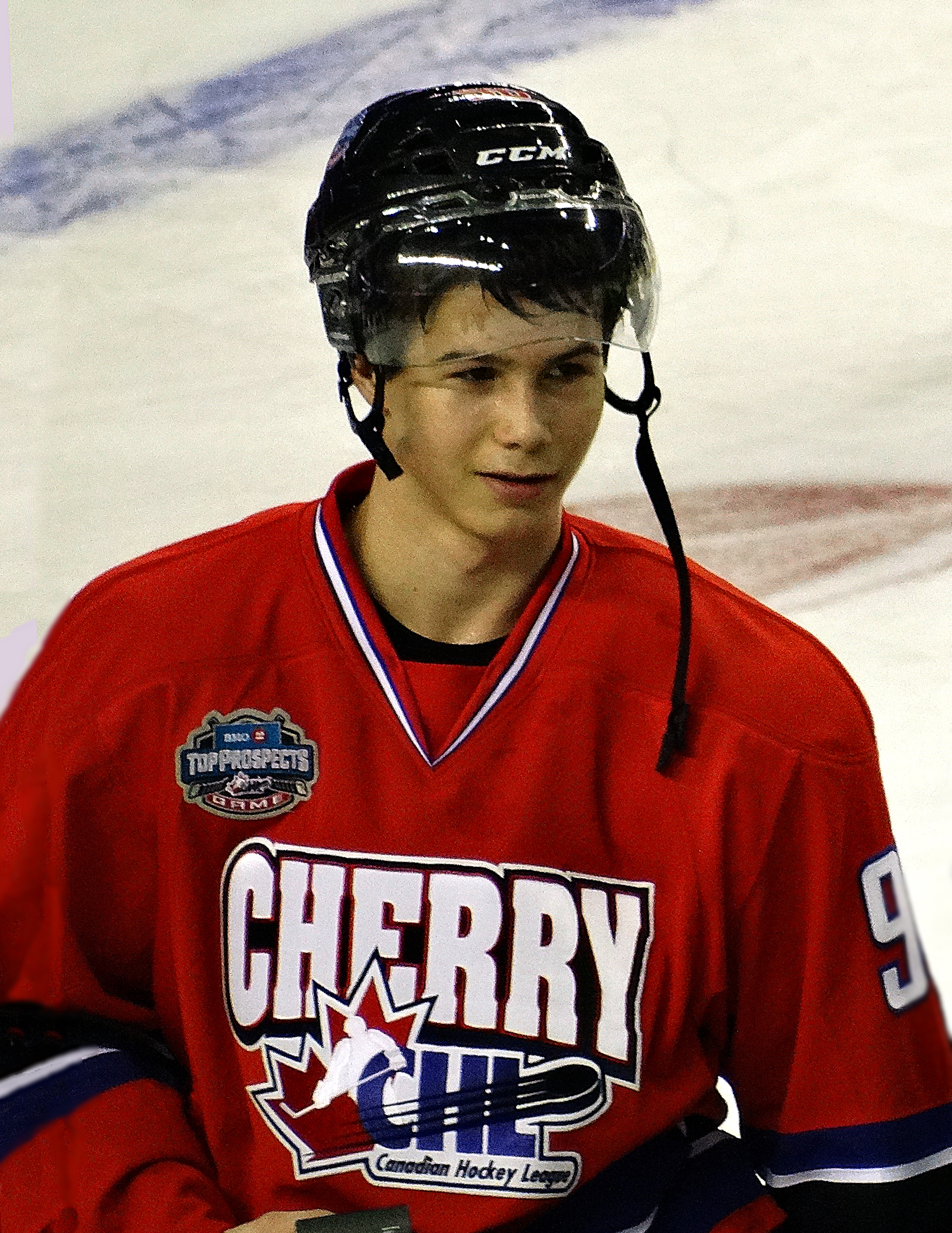
- Goldobin in 2014
- Born: 7 October 1995 (age 30) Moscow, Russia
- Height: 5 ft 11 in (180 cm)
- Weight: 196 lb (89 kg; 14 st 0 lb)
- Position: Right wing
- Shoots: Left
- KHL team Former teams: SKA Saint Petersburg; HIFK; San Jose Sharks; Vancouver Canucks; CSKA Moscow; Metallurg Magnitogorsk; Spartak Moscow
- NHL draft: 27th overall, 2014; San Jose Sharks
- Playing career: 2014–present

Nikolay Sergeevich Goldobin (Николай Сергеевич Голдобин; born 7 October 1995) is a Russian professional ice hockey right winger currently playing for SKA Saint Petersburg of the Kontinental Hockey League (KHL). Goldobin was selected by the San Jose Sharks in the first round (27th overall) of the 2014 NHL entry draft.

== Playing career ==
Goldobin played in the 2008 Quebec International Pee-Wee Hockey Tournament with the HC CSKA Moscow youth team.

=== Junior ===
Goldobin was drafted by the Sarnia Sting in the 1st round (36th overall) of the 2012 OHL Priority Selection. Goldobin was also selected 8th overall by Metallurg Novokuznetsk in the 2012 KHL Junior Draft. Heading into the 2014 NHL entry draft, Goldobin was viewed as a top prospect and possible top 15 pick.

Goldobin began his major junior career in 2011 playing with Russkie Vityazi Chekhov in the Russian Junior Hockey League and he was chosen to compete at the 2012 Ivan Hlinka Memorial Tournament with Team Russia. He joined the Sarnia Sting in 2012 where he led all rookies in goals (30) and points (68) during the 2012–13 OHL season. His outstanding play continued during his second season with Sarnia, as he led the Sting with 94 points in 67 games, good enough for 6th in scoring in the league for the 2013–14 OHL season. He was invited to play in the 2014 CHL Top Prospects Game where he scored a goal and an assist, and was named player of the game for Team Cherry.

=== Professional ===
On 26 September 2014, the Sharks announced they had signed Goldobin to a three-year entry-level contract. He was later reassigned to the Finnish club HIFK for the 2014–15 Liiga season.

In his first full North American season, Goldobin was assigned to begin the 2015–16 season with the Sharks AHL affiliate, the San Jose Barracuda. After one game with the Barracuda, Goldobin received a recall to the Sharks following an injury to center Logan Couture on 16 October 2015. He was inserted immediately into the Sharks top scoring line and made his NHL debut in a 2–1 shootout victory over the New Jersey Devils. In his second game, Goldobin scored his first NHL goal against Jaroslav Halak of the New York Islanders on 17 October 2015, on a feed from Joe Thornton.

On 28 February 2017, he was traded from San Jose along with a conditional 4th round-pick in the 2017 NHL entry draft to the Vancouver Canucks for Jannik Hansen. He made his debut for the Canucks on 4 March 2017, scoring the game-winning goal in a 4–3 victory over the Los Angeles Kings.

In the 2018–19 season, his first full season with the Canucks, Goldobin recorded 27 points in 63 games. On 4 September 2019, the Canucks re-signed him to a one-year, $900,000 contract extension. On 30 September 2019, just before the start of the 2019-20 season, Goldobin was placed on waivers by the Canucks. He cleared waivers the next day and was assigned to the Utica Comets. Goldobin remained with the Comets for the majority of the season, finishing among the club's leading scorers with 50 points in 51 games, before the season was cancelled due to COVID-19.

As an impending restricted free agent with the Canucks, Goldobin opted to leave North America by signing a two-year contract with his original Russian club, CSKA Moscow of the KHL, on 18 June 2020. In the 2020–21 season, Goldobin appeared in 21 regular season games with CSKA, collecting 4 goals and 11 points before he was transferred to a fellow KHL club, Metallurg Magnitogorsk, for the remainder of the season on 14 December 2020.

Following three seasons with Metallurg, Goldobin's rights were traded to fellow Russian club, Spartak Moscow, in exchange for Danila Kvartalnov on 5 June 2023. He was then signed to a two-year contract to commence from the 2023–24 season.

After playing out the 2024–25 season with Spartak Moscow, Goldobin following two offensively prolific seasons was placed on waivers and claimed by SKA Saint Petersburg on 18 August 2025.

== Career statistics ==
=== Regular season and playoffs ===
			Regular season					Playoffs
Season	Team	League	GP	G	A	Pts	PIM	GP	G	A	Pts	PIM
2011–12	Russkie Vityazi Chekhov	MHL	50	13	9	22	8	9	2	1	3	0
2012–13	Sarnia Sting	OHL	68	30	38	68	12	4	0	1	1	0
2013–14	Sarnia Sting	OHL	67	38	56	94	21	—	—	—	—	—
2014–15	HIFK	Liiga	38	11	10	21	12	8	1	5	6	2
2014–15	Worcester Sharks	AHL	9	3	2	5	4	4	0	0	0	0
2015–16	San Jose Barracuda	AHL	60	21	23	44	18	4	2	0	2	4
2015–16	San Jose Sharks	NHL	9	1	1	2	0	—	—	—	—	—
2016–17	San Jose Barracuda	AHL	46	15	26	41	16	—	—	—	—	—
2016–17	San Jose Sharks	NHL	2	0	0	0	0	—	—	—	—	—
2016–17	Vancouver Canucks	NHL	12	3	0	3	0	—	—	—	—	—
2016–17	Utica Comets	AHL	3	4	0	4	0	—	—	—	—	—
2017–18	Utica Comets	AHL	30	9	22	31	8	5	0	6	6	4
2017–18	Vancouver Canucks	NHL	38	8	6	14	6	—	—	—	—	—
2018–19	Vancouver Canucks	NHL	63	7	20	27	18	—	—	—	—	—
2019–20	Utica Comets	AHL	51	19	31	50	14	—	—	—	—	—
2019–20	Vancouver Canucks	NHL	1	0	0	0	0	—	—	—	—	—
2020–21	CSKA Moscow	KHL	21	4	7	11	4	—	—	—	—	—
2020–21	Metallurg Magnitogorsk	KHL	19	2	6	8	10	12	5	4	9	2
2021–22	Metallurg Magnitogorsk	KHL	42	16	23	39	33	23	8	10	18	6
2022–23	Metallurg Magnitogorsk	KHL	59	19	17	36	8	11	2	0	2	4
2023–24	Spartak Moscow	KHL	67	37	41	78	20	11	3	6	9	8
2024–25	Spartak Moscow	KHL	62	21	34	55	16	12	3	9	12	4
2025–26	SKA Saint Petersburg	KHL	58	16	31	47	14	5	1	1	2	2
NHL totals			125	19	27	46	24	—	—	—	—	—
KHL totals			328	115	159	274	105	74	22	30	52	26

=== International ===
Year	Team	Event	Result	GP	G	A	Pts	PIM
2012	Russia	IH18	5th	4	1	2	3	0
2015	Russia	WJC	2nd place, silver medalist(s)	7	2	3	5	2
Junior totals				11	3	5	8	2

== Awards and honours ==
Honours	Year
CHL Top Prospects Game Player of the Game (Team Cherry)	2014

Awards and achievements
Preceded by Mirco Müller	San Jose Sharks first-round draft pick 2014	Succeeded by Timo Meier
