= Marek Růžička =

Czech ice hockey player

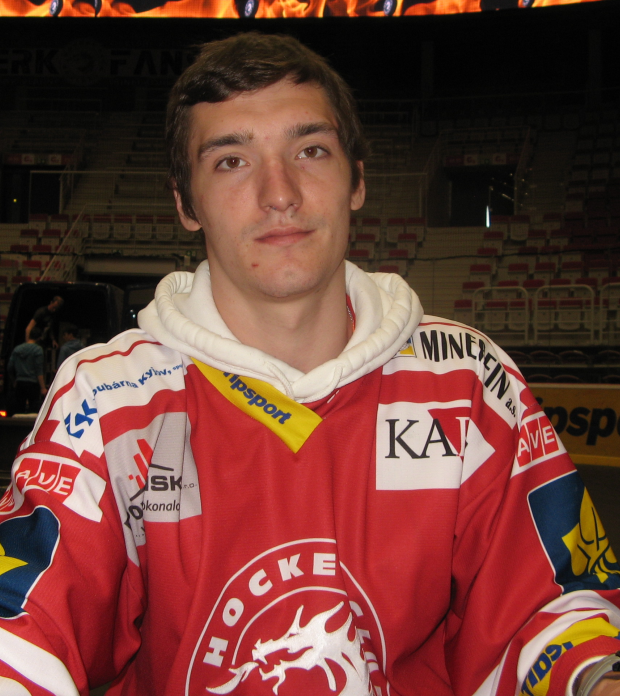
- Born: April 10, 1995 (age 30) Hodonín, Czech Republic
- Height: 6 ft 3 in (191 cm)
- Weight: 183 lb (83 kg; 13 st 1 lb)
- Position: Forward
- Shoots: Left
- FFHG Division 1 team Former teams: Corsaires de Dunkerque; HC Oceláři Třinec; HK Dukla Trenčín; HC Litvínov
- Playing career: 2013–present

Marek Růžička (born April 10, 1995) is a Czech professional ice hockey player. He is currently playing for Corsaires de Dunkerque of the FFHG Division 1 in France.

Růžička made his Czech Extraliga debut playing with HC Oceláři Třinec during the 2013-14 Czech Extraliga season. He also played for HC Litvínov.
