= Slovakia men's national junior ice hockey team =

Slovakia
- Nickname: "dvadsiatka"
- Association: Slovak Ice Hockey Federation
- General manager: Miroslav Šatan
- Head coach: Peter Frühauf
- Assistants: Andrew Boschetto; Jan Simko; Ivan Švarný
- Captain: Adam Sykora
- Most games: Tomáš Kopecký (21)
- Top scorer: Richard Pánik (15)
- Most points: Richard Pánik (22)
- Team colors
- IIHF code: SVK
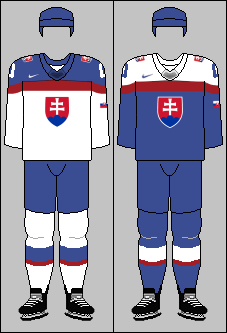

First international
- Slovakia 6 – 4 Kazakhstan (Nové Zámky, Slovakia; November 1, 1993)

Biggest win
- Slovakia 22 – 0 Denmark (Esbjerg, Denmark; January 1, 1994)

Biggest defeat
- Slovakia 0 – 16 Sweden (Rovaniemi, Finland; April 17, 2025)

IIHF World Junior Championship
- Appearances: 33 (first in 1994)
- Best result: (bronze) (1999, 2015)

International record (W–L–T)
- 74-106-9

Medal record

IIHF World Junior Championship
Bronze medal – third place	1999 Canada	Slovakia
Bronze medal – third place	2015 Canada	Slovakia

The Slovakia men's national under 20 ice hockey team is the national under-20 ice hockey team in Slovakia. The team represents Slovakia at the International Ice Hockey Federation's IIHF World Junior Championship.

== World Junior Championship record ==
Year	GP	W	L	T	GF	GA	Pts	Rank
1974–1993	As part of Czechoslovakia							
(Denmark) 1994	8	7	1	0	86	13	14	1st, Promoted to Pool B
(France) 1995	7	5	2	0	33	16	10	2nd, Promoted to Pool A
(United States) 1996	6	2	1	3	24	23	7	7th place
(Switzerland) 1997	6	2	4	0	23	26	4	6th place
(Finland) 1998	6	3	3	0	26	18	2	9th place
(Canada) 1999	6	4	1	1	17	14	7	Won bronze medal
(Sweden) 2000	7	2*	4	1	11	15	1	9th place
(Russia) 2001	7	1	6	0	16	25	2	8th place
(Czech Republic) 2002	7	2	3+	2	20	19	6	8th place
(Canada) 2003	6	3	3	0	17	14	4	5th place
(Finland) 2004	6	2	3	1	13	14	5	6th place
(United States) 2005	6	4	2	0	15	13	8	7th place
(Canada) 2006	6	2	3	1	19	27	5	8th place
(Sweden) 2007	6	1	5	0	16	21	3	8th place
(Czech Republic) 2008	6	3	3	0	16	11	9	7th place
(Canada) 2009	7	3†	4	0	22	28	5	4th place
(Canada) 2010	6	2	4	0	19	29	6	8th place
(United States) 2011	6	2†	4	0	14	24	5	8th place
(Canada) 2012	6	2	4	0	18	30	6	6th place
(Russia) 2013	6	1†	3^	0	19	33	6	8th place
(Sweden) 2014	5	1	4	0	16	22	3	8th place
(Canada) 2015	7	4	3	0	15	21	6	Won bronze medal
(Finland) 2016	5	1	4	0	8	20	3	7th place
(Canada) 2017	5	1	4	0	9	22	3	8th place
(United States) 2018	5	2	3	0	12	17	6	7th place
(Canada) 2019	5	1	4	0	18	22	3	8th place
(Czech Republic) 2020	5	1	4	0	9	28	3	8th place
(Canada) 2021	5	1	3^	0	7	18	4	8th place
(Canada) 2022	4	1†	3	0	11	27	2	9th place
(Canada) 2023	5	2	3^+	0	17	16	8	6th place
(Sweden) 2024	5	3	1+	0	22	20	9	6th place
(Canada) 2025	5	2†	3	0	14	19	9	6th place
(United States) 2026	5	1	4	0	14	20	3	8th place
(Canada) 2027								

† Includes one win in extra time (in the preliminary round)
^ Includes one loss in extra time (in the preliminary round)
* Includes one win in extra time (in the playoff round)
+ Includes one loss in extra time (in the playoff round)

== Head coaches (WJC) ==
- 1994 – Július Šupler
- 1995 – Dušan Žiška
- 1996–97 – František Hossa
- 1998 – Dušan Žiška
- 1999 – Ján Filc
- 2000 – Dušan Žiška
- 2001 – Ján Selvek
- 2002 – Július Šupler
- 2003 – Róbert Spišák
- 2004 – Jozef Frühauf
- 2005 – Dušan Gregor
- 2006 – Branislav Šajban
- 2007 – Ján Jaško
- 2008–11 – Štefan Mikeš
- 2012–18 – Ernest Bokroš
- 2019–21 – Róbert Petrovický
- 2022–25 – Ivan Feneš
- 2026 – Peter Frühauf
