= 2013 IIHF World U18 Championships =

2013 IIHF U18 World Championship

Tournament details
- Host country: Russia
- Venues: 2 (in 1 host city)
- Dates: 18–28 April 2013
- Teams: 10

Final positions
- Champions: Canada (3rd title)
- Runners-up: United States
- Third place: Finland
- Fourth place: Russia

Tournament statistics
- Games played: 30
- Goals scored: 199 (6.63 per game)
- Attendance: 65,066 (2,169 per game)
- Scoring leader: (Canada) Connor McDavid (14 points)

Awards
- MVP: (Canada) Connor McDavid

Official website
- u18worlds2013.iihf.com

The 2013 IIHF U18 World Championship was the 15th IIHF World U18 Championship and was hosted in Sochi, Russia. This was also a test event for the facilities to be used in the 2014 Winter Olympics. It began on 18 April 2013 with the gold medal game played on 28 April 2013.

Canada won its third under-18 championship by defeating the four-time defending champion Americans 3–2. The host Russians lost to Finland 2–1 in the bronze medal game. MVP Connor McDavid set Canadian records for goals and points in the tournament.

== Top Division ==
=== Format ===
A new format was implemented. The four best ranked teams from the preliminary round advanced to the quarterfinals, while the last placed teams played a relegation round in a best of three format to determine the relegated team. Additionally the practice of playing ranking games (fifth place through eighth place) was abandoned.

=== Venues ===
- Bolshoy Ice Dome
- Shayba Arena

=== Officials ===
The IIHF selected 12 referees and 10 linesmen to work the 2013 IIHF U18 World Championship.
They were the following:

Referees

- (Sweden) Tobias Björk
- (Germany) Marcus Brill
- (Slovenia) Igor Dremelj
- (Hungary) Peter Gebei
- (Denmark) Jacob Grumsen
- (Czech Republic) René Hradil
- (Switzerland) Andreas Koch
- (Finland) Jari Leppäalho
- (United States) Timothy Mayer
- (Slovakia) Róbert Mullner
- (Canada) Steve Papp
- (Russia) Evgeniy Romasko

Linesmen

- (Belarus) Vasili Kaliada
- (Japan) Kenji Kosaka
- (Netherlands) Joep Leermakers
- (United States) Fraser McIntyre
- (Russia) Eduard Metalnikov
- (Finland) Pasi Nieminen
- (Sweden) Henrik Pihlblad
- (Poland) Mariusz Smura
- (Czech Republic) Rudolf Tosenovjan
- (Canada) Matt Traub

=== Preliminary round ===
==== Group A ====
Pos	Team	Pld	W	OTW	OTL	L	GF	GA	GD	Pts	Qualification
1	Russia	4	4	0	0	0	22	8	+14	12	Quarterfinals
2	Finland	4	3	0	0	1	14	7	+7	9	Quarterfinals
3	United States	4	2	0	0	2	15	10	+5	6	Quarterfinals
4	Czech Republic	4	1	0	0	3	15	13	+2	3	Quarterfinals
5	Latvia	4	0	0	0	4	3	31	−28	0	Relegation round

Source: IIHF

All times are local. (Moscow Time – UTC+4)

18 April 2013; 15:30	Latvia	0–7 (0–4, 0–1, 0–2)	Finland	Bolshoy Ice Dome; Attendance: 559

Game reference

Maksims Rešetņikovs
Goalies
Juuse Saros
Referees:
(Slovenia) Igor Dremel
(Hungary) Peter Gebei
Linesmen:
(Poland) Mariusz Smura
(Czech Republic) Rudolf Tosenovjan

0–1	06:20 – J. Honka (J. Ikonen)
0–2	09:53 – O. Rauhala (J. Tanus)
0–3	17:00 – A. Lehkonen (J. Ikonen)
0–4	19:21 – M. Pulli (A. Lehkonen) (PP)
0–5	21:45 – K. Kapanen (O. Rauhala, J. Tanus) (PP)
0–6	47:45 – A. Lehkonen (E. Autio, A. Mäkinen)
0–7	50:33 – A. Mustonen (J. Kuronen)

12 min
Penalties
10 min
21
Shots
42

18 April 2013; 20:00	Russia	4–3 (1–2, 1–0, 2–1)	United States	Bolshoy Ice Dome; Attendance: 6500

Game reference

Igor Shesterkin
Goalies
Thatcher Demko
Referees:
(Sweden) Tobias Björk
(Canada) Steve Papp
Linesmen:
(Sweden) Henrik Pihlblad
(Canada) Matt Traub

	0–1	02:34 – J. Eichel (J. Compher, A. Louis) (PP)
	0–2	07:34 – W. Butcher (H. Fasching) (PP)
N. Sedtikov (R. Galeyev, N. Demidov) – 07:43	1–2
P. Buchnevich (N. Glukhov, N. Demidov) (PP) – 22:19	2–2
I. Ivanov (P. Buchnevich, N. Shatski) – 41:33	3–2
	3–3	51:14 – J. Compher (T. Motte) (SH)
V. Tkachev (I. Barbashev) – 58:06	4–3

12 min
Penalties
10 min
28
Shots
37

19 April 2013; 17:00	Czech Republic	7–0 (3–0, 2–0, 2–0)	Latvia	Bolshoy Ice Dome; Attendance: 350

Game reference

René Svoboda
Goalies
Maksims Rešetņikovs
Referees:
(Denmark) Jacob Grumsen
(Slovakia) Róbert Mullner
Linesmen:
(Belarus) Vasili Kaliada
(Netherlands) Joep Leermakers

P. Zdráhal (D. Kubalík, M. Kokeš) (PP) – 02:45	1–0
P. Zdráhal (D. Kubalík, M. Kokeš) (PP) – 13:43	2–0
M. Indrák (D. Kubalík, P. Zacha) – 19:03	3–0
P. Zdráhal (D. Kubalík, D. Pastrňák) (PP) – 35:20	4–0
O. Kaše (L. Rob, D. Kämpf) – 35:57	5–0
T. Dvořák (M. Indrák, Kubalík) – 49:43	6–0
R. Přikryl (J. Košťálek, J. Štencel) (PP) – 51:37	7–0

6 min
Penalties
16 min
51
Shots
14

20 April 2013; 15:30	United States	4–3 (1–2, 3–1, 0–0)	Czech Republic	Bolshoy Ice Dome; Attendance: 1395

Game reference

Thatcher Demko
Goalies
René Svoboda
Referees:
(Germany) Marcus Brill
(Slovenia) Igor Dremelj
Linesmen:
(Russia) Eduard Metalnikov
(Sweden) Henrik Pihlblad

	0–1	12:18 – A. Zbořil (P. Zdráhal, F. Pyrochta)
	0–2	16:22 – D. Kämpf (O. Kaše) (SH)
T. Motte (J. Compher, W. Butcher) – 19:39	1–2
J. Compher (J. Hayden, A. Louis) – 20:19	2–2
T. Motte (H. Fasching, W. Butcher) – 23:34	3–2
	3–3	24:28 – A. Zbořil (P. Zdráhal, J. Košťálek)
E. Allen (M. McCarron, S. Malone) – 25:23	4–3

4 min
Penalties
8 min
50
Shots
21

20 April 2013; 20:00	Finland	1–3 (0–0,0–2,1–1)	Russia	Bolshoy Ice Dome; Attendance: 6500

Game reference

Ville Husso
Goalies
Igor Shesterkin
Referees:
(Switzerland) Andreas Koch
(Slovakia) Róbert Mullner
Linesmen:
(Belarus) Vaslili Kaliada
(Canada) Matt Traub

	0–1	22:26 – I. Barbashev (V. Tkachev, N. Glukhov) (PP)
	0–2	I. Barbashev (V. Tkachev, V. Nichushkin)
J. Tanus (K. Kapanen, J. Honka)	1–2
	1–3	59:42 – V. Tkachev (R. Rafikov, I. Shesterkin) (ENG)

10 min
Penalties
4 min
25
Shots
31

21 April 2013; 17:00	Latvia	1–7 (0–4, 1–0, 0–3	United States	Bolshoy Ice Dome

Game reference

Kristaps Nazarovs
Goalies
Thatcher Demko
Referees:
(Czech Republic) René Hradil
(Russia) Evgeniy Romasko
Linesmen:
(Japan) Kenji Kosaka
(Sweden) Henrik Pihlblad

	0–1	02:54 – K. Labanc (K. Thompson)
	0–2	06:55 – T. Kelleher (G. Ausmus)
	0–3	11:52 – T. Kelleher (M. McCarron, S. Eiserman)
	0–4	19:59 – E. Allen (J. Compher, A. Louis) (PP)
G. Golovkovs (R. Bukarts) – 27:57	1–4
	1–5	48:58 – H. Fasching (J. Eichel)
	1–6	52:51 – T. Motte (H. Fasching)
	1–7	59:14 – T. Vannelli (T. Motte, W. Butcher)

10 min
Penalties
6 min
22
Shots
47

22 April 2013; 15:30	Finland	4–3 (1–0, 3–0, 0–3)	Czech Republic	Bolshoy Ice Dome; Attendance: 600

Game reference

Juuse Saros
Goalies
René Svoboda
Referees:
(Sweden) Tobias Björk
(United States) Timothy Mayer
Linesmen:
(Netherlands) Joep Leermakers
(United States) Fraser McInyre

K. Kapanen (M. Ilvonen, O. Rauhala) – 14:24	1–0
J. Antonen (S. Kinnunen, A. Lintuniemi) – 21:35	2–0
K. Kapanen (O. Rauhala) – 28:11	3–0
K. Kapanen (J. Ikonen) – 32:52	4–0
	4–1	42:39 – L. Rob (J. Štencel) (SH)
	4–2	48:19 – D. Kämpf (O. Kaše, L. Rob)
	4–3	58:21 – J. Vrána (J. Štencel, P. Zacha)

14 min
Penalties
24 min
24
Shots
44

22 April 2013; 20:00	Russia	10–2 (3–1, 3–1, 4–0)	Latvia	Bolshoy Ice Dome; Attendance: 4500

Game reference

Ivan Bocharov
Nikita Serebryakov
Goalies
Kristaps Nazarovs

A. Zub (R. Galeyev) – 01:33	1–0
P. Buchnevich (I. Barbashev, R. Rafikov) (PP) – 07:47	2–0
N. Glukhov – 17:04	3–0
	3–1	17:58 – H. Egle (O. Aploks, E. Homjakovs)
	3–2	20:39 – T. Bernhards (R. Maslovskis, G. Golovkovs) (PP2)
N. Glukhov (S. Tolchinski) (PP) – 27:31	4–2
I. Barbashev (V. Tkachev, R. Rafikov) – 29:01	5–2
D. Yudin (P. Buchnevich, V. Tkachev) – 33:08	6–2
V. Tkachev (I. Barbashev, R. Rafikov) (PP) – 45:09	7–2
N. Demidov (I. Ivanov, N. Glukhov) (PP) – 47:40	8–2
A. Zub (N. Sedtikov, V. Leshenko) – 57:14	9–2
P. Buchnevich (V. Nichushkin, N. Glukhov) – 58:35	10–2

8 min
Penalties
16 min
36
Shots
22

23 April 2013; 15:30	United States	1–2 (1–0, 0–1, 0–1)	Finland	Bolshoy Ice Dome; Attendance: 800

Game reference

Thatcher Demko
Goalies
Juuse Saros

J. Hayden (G. Ausmus) – 00:37	1–0
	1–1	36:14 – J. Tanus (K. Kapanen, O. Rauhala)
	1–2	47:12 – A. Mustonen (A. Lehkonen, J. Ikonen)

10 min
Penalties
8 min
50
Shots
19

23 April 2013; 20:00	Czech Republic	2–5 (0–0, 1–3, 1–2)	Russia	Bolshoy Ice Dome; Attendance: 6700

Game reference

Jindřich Pacl
Goalies
Igor Shesterkin
Nikita Serebraykov
Referees:
(Switzerland) Andreas Koch
(Canada) Steve Papp
Linesmen:
(Netherlands) Joep Leermakers
(Finland) Pasi Nieminen

	0–1	21:04 – P. Buchnevich (V. Tkachev)
	0–2	25:18 – N. Demidov (P. Buchnevich, N. Glukhov)
	0–3	30:04 – S. Tolchinski (SH)
J. Vrána (D. Kämpf, M. Kohout) – 37:53	1–3
D. Pastrňák (P. Zacha) (SH) – 47:48	2–3
	2–4	51:23 – V. Tkachyov
	2–5	55:47 – N. Shatski (N. Setdikov, R. Galeyev)

2 min
Penalties
12 min
38
Shots
36

==== Group B ====
Pos	Team	Pld	W	OTW	OTL	L	GF	GA	GD	Pts	Qualification
1	Canada	4	4	0	0	0	23	3	+20	12	Quarterfinals
2	Sweden	4	3	0	0	1	20	9	+11	9	Quarterfinals
3	Switzerland	4	2	0	0	2	8	17	−9	6	Quarterfinals
4	Germany	4	1	0	0	3	8	18	−10	3	Quarterfinals
5	Slovakia	4	0	0	0	4	7	19	−12	0	Relegation round

Source: IIHF

All times are local. (Moscow Time – UTC+4)

18 April 2013; 15:00	Germany	1–9 (1–3, 0–4, 0–2)	Sweden	Shayba Arena; Attendance: 150

Game reference

Kevin Reich
Hannibal Weitzmann
Goalies
Jonas Johansson
Referees:
(Denmark) Jacob Grumsen
(Czech Republic) René Hradil
Linesmen:
(Japan) Kenji Kosaka
(Finland) Pasi Nieminen

	0–1	07:40 – L. Wallmark (PP)
T. Bender (F. Pfohl) – 08:10	1–1
	1–2	09:39 – A. Blidh (A. Borgman, A. Karlsson)
	1–3	16:57 – L. Bristedt (W. Nylander, L. Wallmark) (EA)
	1–4	20:55 – A. Brodecki
	1–5	24:27 – A. Burakowsky (A. Henriksson) (PP)
	1–6	24:55 – W. Nylander (J. de la Rose, J. Bergman)
	1–7	31:13 – A. Burakowsky (A. Brodecki) (SH)
	1–8	40:18 – J. de la Rose (PS)
	1–9	58:49 – R. Andersson (O. Lindblom) (PP)

10 min
Penalties
26 min
26
Shots
29

18 April 2013; 19:00	Slovakia	1–4 (1–2, 0–0, 0–2)	Canada	Shayba Arena; Attendance: 70

Game reference

Denis Godla
Goalies
Spencer Martin
Referees:
(United States) Timothy Mayer
(Russia) Evgeniy Romasko
Linesmen:
(United States) Fraser McIntyre
(Russia) Eduard Metalniko

D. Šoltés – 03:11	1–0
	1–1	07:20 – N. Baptiste (N. Ritchie, L. Dauphin)
	1–2	16:39 – C. McDavid (J. Morrissey) (PP)
	1–3	51:10 – S. Reinhart (C. McDavid)
	1–4	51:44 – S. Bennett (C. McDavid)

16 min
Penalties
12 min
13
Shots
35

19 April 2013; 19:00	Switzerland	4–1 (2–0, 1–0, 1–1)	Slovakia	Shayba Arena; Attendance: 520

Game reference

Nicola Aeberhard
Goalies
Denis Godla
Referees:
(Germany) Marcus Brill
(Finland) Jari Leppaalho
Linesmen:
(Japan) Kenji Kosaka
(Poland) Mariusz Smura

J. Fuchs (L. Fazzini) – 03:27	1–0
P. Suter (J. Fuchs, L. Fazzini) – 05:57	2–0
P. Suter (L. Fazzini) – 29:31	3–0
P. Baltisberger (D. Malgin) (PP) – 47:16	4–0
	4–1	49:58 – P. Bačík (M. Holenda, R. Varga) (PP)

8 min
Penalties
12 min
30
Shots
19

20 April 2013; 15:00	Canada	3–1 (2–0, 1–1, 0–0)	Germany	Shayba Arena; Attendance: 620

Game reference

Philippe Desrosiers
Goalies
Kevin Reich
Referees:
(Sweden) Tobias Björk
(Finland) Jari Leppaalho
Linesmen:
(Netherlands) Joep Leermakers
(Czech Republic) Rudolf Tosenovjan

M. Bowey (J. Morrissey, C. McDavid) (PP) – 01:27	1–0
Y. Laplante (R. McKeown, C. Verhaeghe) – 11:22	2–0
C. McDavid (S. Reinhart, J. Dickinson) – 32:09	3–0
	3–1	39:04 – J. Moser (D. Kahun, L. Draisaitl)

12 min
Penalties
24 min
39
Shots
26

20 April 2013; 19:00	Sweden	6–0 (3–0, 1–0, 2–0)	Switzerland	Shayba Arena; Attendance: 480

Game reference

Jonas Johansson
Goalies
Nicola Aeberhard
Ludovic Waeber
Referees:
(Hungary) Peter Gebei
(United States) Timothy Mayer
Linesmen:
(United States) Fraser McIntyre
(Finland) Pasi Nieminen

L. Bristedt (V. Öhman) (SH) – 00:54	1–0
O. Lindblom – 02:56	2–0
W. Nylander (R. Hägg, J. de la Rose) (PP) – 04:52	3–0
O. Lindblom (A. Burakowsky) – 26:16	4–0
A. Karlsson (J. Forsbacka Karlsson) (SH) – 46:10	5–0
R. Hagg (L. Wallmark) (PP) – 56:27	6–0

26 min
Penalties
14 min
32
Shots
24

21 April 2013; 19:00	Slovakia	2–5 (0–1, 1–3, 1–1)	Sweden	Shayba Arena; Attendance: 692

Game reference

Dávid Okoličány
Goalies
Ebbe Sionas
Referees:
(Switzerland) Andreas Koch
(Canada) Steve Papp
Linesmen:
(Russia) Eduard Metalnikov
(Poland) Mariusz Smura

	0–1	17:01 – A. Burakowsky (V. Crus-Rydberg, R. Hägg) (SH)
	0–2	25:12 – A. Burakowsky (A. Henriksson, O. Lindblom)
	0–3	32:05 – L. Bristedt (R. Hagg, L. Wallmark) (PP)
	0–4	38:54 – A. Karlsson (W. Westlund, A. Brodecki)
D. Šoltés (R. Varga, E. Černák) – 39:17	1–4
P. Cehlárik (R. Lantoši, D. Rehák) – 46:43	2–4
	2–5	57:02 – L. Wallmark (A. Karlsson, L. Bristedt) (PP)

14 min
Penalties
39 min
19
Shots
44

22 April 2013; 15:00	Canada	10–1 (2–0, 6–1, 2–0)	Switzerland	Shayba Arena; Attendance: 225

Game reference

Spencer Martin
Goalies
Nicola Aeberhard
Ludovic Waeber
Referees:
(Denmark) Jacob Grumsen
(Czech Republic) René Hradil
Linesmen:
(Belarus) Vasili Kalida
(Finland) Pasi Nieminen

Z. Nastasiuk (C. Verhaeghe, S. Bennett) – 07:02	1–0
S. Bennett (Z. Nastasiuk, C. Vergaeghe) – 10:41	2–0
J. Morrissey (N. Ritchie) – 21:06	3–0
M. Klimchuk (S. Theodore, C. McDavid) – 26:16	4–0
	4–1	28:18 – D. Malgin (F. Hogger, M. Müller)
J. Morrissey (M. Klimchuk, C. McDavid) (PP) – 30:51	5–1
N. Baptiste (S. Theodore, F. Gauthier) (PP) – 36:00	6–1
L. Dauphin (N. Ritchie) – 37:02	7–1
D. Heatherington (C. Verhaeghe, Z. Nastasiuk) (EA) – 37:45	8–1
S. Reinhart (M. Klimchuk) (SH) – 46:11	9–1
L. Dauphin (C. Bigras, S. Theodore) (PP) – 49:33	10–1

8 min
Penalties
10 min
35
Shots
21

22 April 2013; 19:00	Germany	6–3 (2–2, 2–1, 2–0)	Slovakia	Shayba Arena; Attendance: 184

Game reference

Kevin Reich
Goalies
Denis Godla
Dávid Okoličány

P. Tuomie (L. Draisaitl, D. Kahun) – 04:35	1–0
	1–1	05:41 – R. Lantoši (P. Cehlárik)
D. Kahun (L. Draisaitl, P. Tuomie) – 10:38	2–1
	2–2	16:05 – R. Lantoši (A. Sloboda, P. Cehlárik)
	2–3	22:10 – D. Šoltés (R. Varga, E. Černák)
P. Tuomie (L. Draisaitl, D. Kahun) – 33:26	3–3
D. Kahun (T. Bender, L. Draisaitl) – 38:55	4–3
A. Eder (M. Eisenschmid, J. Müller) – 43:06	5–3
L. Draisaitl (D. Kahun, F. Pfohl) – 55:57	6–3

6 min
Penalties
6 min
21
Shots
34

23 April 2013; 15:00	Sweden	0–6 (0–1, 0–3, 0–2)	Canada	Shayba Arena; Attendance: 490

Game reference

Jonas Johansson
Ebbe Sionas
Goalies
Philippe Desrosiers
Referees:
(Finland) Jari Leppaalho
(Russia) Evgeniy Romasko
Linesmen:
(United States) Fraser McIntyre
(Czech Republic) Rudolf Tosenovjan

0–1	01:17 – C. McDavid (J. Morrissey, M. Bowey) (PP)
0–2	23:26 – Z. Nastasiuk (H. Garlent)
0–3	29:03 – M. Klimchuk (J. Morrissey, C. McDavid) (PP)
0–4	37:44 – N. Ritchie (C. Bigras, N. Baptiste)
0–5	46:54 – C. McDavid (M. Klimchuk, S. Morin) (PP)
0–6	52:17 – C. McDavid (S. Reinhart) (PP)

14 min
Penalties
14 min
28
Shots
36

23 April 2013; 19:00	Switzerland	3–0 (1–0, 1–0, 1–0)	Germany	Shayba Arena; Attendance: 180

Game reference

Nicola Aeberhard
Goalies
Kevin Reich
Referees:
(United States) Timothy Mayer
(Slovakia) Róbert Mullner
Linesmen:
(Russia) Eduard Metalnikov
(Canada) Matt Traub

L. Hischier (D. Malgin, P. Baltisberger) (PP) – 08:00	1–0
D. Malgin (P. Baltisberger) (PP) – 26:12	2–0
J. Fuchs (Y. Rathgeb) – 58:42	3–0

6 min
Penalties
10 min
34
Shots
19

=== Relegation round ===
The last-placed teams play a best-of-three series.

25 April 2013; 12:00	Slovakia	5–2 (2–0, 1–2, 2–0)	Latvia	Shayba Arena; Attendance: 120

Game reference

Dávid Okoličány
Goalies
Kristaps Nazarovs

D. Rehák (P. Cehlárik) – 03:01	1–0
M. Boboš (S. Petráš, M. Predajnianský) – 11:49	2–0
	2–1	25:35 – H. Egle (E. Homjakovs, G. Zemītis)
R. Varga (T. Šille, D. Šoltés) – 26:21	3–1
	3–2	38:28 – E. Homjakovs (J. Jaks, O. Aploks)
P. Cehlárik (R. Lantoši, P. Bačík) (PP) – 49:45	4–2
R. Lantoši (P. Cehlárik) – 58:06	5–2

4 min
Penalties
10 min
38
Shots
34

26 April 2013; 12:00	Latvia	2–3 (2–2, 0–0, 0–1)	Slovakia	Shayba Arena; Attendance: 253

Game reference

Maxims Resetnikovs
Goalies
Dávid Okoličány
Referees:
(Hungary) Peter Gebei
(Denmark) Jacob Grumsen
Linesmen:
(Belarus) Vasili Kaliada
(Poland) Mariusz Smura

	0–1	09:03 – D. Rehák (R. Lantoši)
	0–2	11:28 – R. Lantoši (P. Cehlárik) (PP)
J. Jaks (T. Bernhards, G. Golovkovs) (PP2) – 14:52	1–2
R. Bukarts (B. Birzītis, R. Šmits) – 19:15	2–2
	2–3	44:33 – D. Šoltés (R. Varga)

24 min
Penalties
14 min
29
Shots
31

- Latvia is relegated to 2014 Division I A; the third game was not played because the result of the relegation series had been decided.

=== Knockout stage ===
Quarterfinals
A1	Russia	8
B4	Germany	4
B2	Sweden	0
A3	United States	4
A2	Finland	7
B3	Switzerland	4
A4	Czech Republic	0
B1	Canada	6

Semifinals
A1	Russia	3
A3	United States	4
A2	Finland	1
B1	Canada	3

Finals
A3	United States	2
B1	Canada	3
Bronze medal game
A1	Russia	1
A2	Finland	2

==== Quarterfinals ====
25 April 2013; 16:00	Finland	7–4 (1–0, 2–3, 4–1)	Switzerland	Bolshoy Ice Dome; Attendance: 1014

Game reference

Juuse Saros
Goalies
Nicola Aeberhard
Referees:
(Denmark) Jacob Grumsen
(Russia) Evgeniy Romasko
Linesmen:
(Czech Republic) Rudolf Tosenovjan
(Canada) Matt Traub

J. Antonen (S. Kinnunen, J. Kuronen) – 10:21	1–0
J. Ikonen (A. Lehkonen) – 20:17	2–0
	2–1	20:26 – F. Hogger (L. Fazzini)
J. Ikonen (A. Mustonen, J. Antonen) (PP) – 22:07	3–1
	3–2	33:22 – M. Müller (L. Fazzini) (PP)
	3–3	38:45 – P. Suter (P. Baltisberger)
A. Mustonen (A. Lehkonen, J. Ikonen) – 44:01	4–3
J. Antonen (A. Mustonen, A. Lehkonen) (PP) – 44:47	5–3
J. Puhakka (O. Rauhala, J. Honka) – 45:27	6–3
	6–4	48:12 – Y. Rathgeb (J. Fuchs, M. Müller) (PP)
J. Tanus (K. Kapanen) – 49:35	7–4

14 min
Penalties
6 min
31
Shots
31

25 April 2013; 16:00	Sweden	0–4 (0–2, 0–0, 0–2)	United States	Shayba Arena; Attendance: 615

Game reference

Jonas Johansson
Goalies
Thatcher Demko
Referees:
(Czech Republic) René Hradil
(Canada) Steve Papp
Linesmen:
(Netherlands) Joep Leermakers
(Russia) Eduard Metalnikov

0–1	13:14 – W. Butcher (T. Vannelli, E. Allen) (PP)
0–2	17:31 – T. Motte (H. Fasching)
0–3	46:50 – M. McCarron (T. Kelleher) (PP)
0–4	55:08 – J. Compher

12 min
Penalties
14 min
28
Shots
42

25 April 2013; 20:00	Russia	8–4 (2–1, 4–0, 2–3)	Germany	Bolshoy Ice Dome; Attendance: 6864

Game reference

Igor Shesterkin
Nikita Serebryakov
Goalies
Kevin Reich
Referees:
(Finland) Jari Leppaalho
(Slovakia) Róbert Mullner
Linesmen:
(Japan) Kenji Kosaka
(Poland) Mariusz Smura

V. Nichushkin (P. Buchnevich, N. Demidov) (PP) – 01:42	1–0
	1–1	08:01 – T. Bender (J. Moser, L. Draisaitl)
S. Tolchinsky (I. Barbashev, V. Tkachev) (PP) – 18:18	2–1
V. Nichushkin (P. Buchnevich, I. Ivanov) – 21:47	3–1
R. Galeyev (N. Setdikov, N. Shatski) – 26:50	4–1
A. Alexeyev (Svechnikov, V. Leshenko) – 27:43	5–1
S. Tolchinski (I. Barbashev) – 31:44	6–1
	6–2	41:21 – D. Kahun (EA)
	6–3	42:53 – A. Eder (M. Kammerer)
R. Galeyev (N. Shatski, N. Setdikov) – 43:24	7–3
	7–4	47:31 – F. Wagner (Y. Walch, P. Tuomie) (PP)
V. Nichushkin – 53:39	8–4

85 min
Penalties
83 min
44
Shots
37

25 April 2013; 20:00	Canada	6–0 (1–0, 2–0, 3–0)	Czech Republic	Shayba Arena; Attendance: 898

Game reference

Philippe Desrosiers
Goalies
Jindřich Pacl
Referees:
(Slovenia) Igor Dremelj
(United States) Timothy Mayer
Linesmen:
(United States) Fraser McIntyre
(Finland) Pasi Nieminen

S. Reinhart (S. Bennett, M. Bowey) – 19:27	1–0
C. McDavid (S. Bennett, S. Theodore) – 38:31	2–0
N. Baptiste (S. Theodore) – 38:57	3–0
C. McDavid (N. Baptiste, S. Bennett) (PP) – 45:45	4–0
C. McDavid (S. Reinhart, M. Klimchuk) – 48:31	5–0
L. Dauphin (N. Baptiste, S. Morin) – 55:10	6–0

12 min
Penalties
12 min
37
Shots
19

==== Semifinals ====
26 April 2013; 16:00	Canada	3–1 (0–0, 2–0, 1-1)	Finland	Bolshoy Ice Dome; Attendance: 2956

Game reference

Philippe Desrosiers
Goalies
Juuse Saros
Referees:
(United States) Timothy Mayer
(Russia) Evgeniy Romasko
Linesmen:
(Japan) Kenji Kosaka
(Sweden) Henrik Pihlblad

M. Klimchuk (F. Gauthier, S. Reinhart) – 23:53	1–0
J. Morrissey (F. Gauthier, M. Klimchuk) (PP) – 24:54	2–0
	2–1	47:13 – A. Ainali (J. Antonen, A. Lehkonen) (PP2)
S. Bennett 59:22 (ENG)	3–1

6 min
Penalties
12 min
39
Shots
26

26 April 2013; 20:00	Russia	3–4 GWS (0–1, 2–0, 1–2) (OT 0–0) (SO: 0–1)	United States	Bolshoy Ice Dome; Attendance: 6779

Game reference

Igor Shesterkin
Goalies
Thatcher Demko
Referees:
(Sweden) Tobias Björk
(Czech Republic) René Hradil
Linesmen:
(Finland) Pasi Nieminen
(Czech Republic) Rudolf Tosenovjan

	0–1	16:09 – M. McCarron (PP)
P. Buchnevich (V. Nichushkin) (PP2) – 25:14	1–1
V. Nichushkin (P. Buchnevich) – 32:49	2–1
	2–2	44:04 – T. Vannelli (T. Kelleher, E. Allen)
V. Leshenko (I. Barbashev) – 56:41	3–2
	3–3	57:55 – A. Louis

S. Tolchinski (miss)
P. Buchnevich (miss)
Shootout
T. Kelleher
(miss) A. Louis
J. Compher
8 min
Penalties
10 min
29
Shots
58

==== Bronze medal game ====
28 April 2013; 16:00	Russia	1–2 (0–2, 1–0, 0–0)	Finland	Bolshoy Ice Dome; Attendance: 5925

Game reference
Igor Shesterkin	Goalies	Juuse Saros	Referees: (Czech Republic) René Hradil (Canada) Steve Papp; Linesmen: (United States) Fraser McIntyre (Canada) Matt Traub
V. Tkachev (R. Rafikov) (PP) – 30:50 / Goals / 00:34 – A. Lehkonen (J. Honka, A. Lintuniemi); 09:43 – K. Kapanen (O. Rauhala)			Referees: (Czech Republic) René Hradil (Canada) Steve Papp; Linesmen: (United States) Fraser McIntyre (Canada) Matt Traub
2 min	Penalties	6 min	Referees: (Czech Republic) René Hradil (Canada) Steve Papp; Linesmen: (United States) Fraser McIntyre (Canada) Matt Traub
25	Shots	27	Referees: (Czech Republic) René Hradil (Canada) Steve Papp; Linesmen: (United States) Fraser McIntyre (Canada) Matt Traub

==== Gold medal game ====
28 April 2013; 20:00	Canada	3–2 (1–0, 2–2, 0–0)	United States	Bolshoy Ice Dome; Attendance: 6127

Game reference

Philippe Desrosiers
Goalies
Thatcher Demko
Referees:
(Sweden) Tobias Björk
(Russia) Evgeniy Romasko
Linesmen:
(Netherlands) Joep Leermakers
(Russia) Eduard Metalnikov

L. Dauphin (N. Baptiste) – 09:29	1–0
	1–1	21:48 – C. Clifton (H. Fasching)
	1–2	29:42 – M. McCarron (T. Kelleher)
M. Bowey (L. Dauphin) – 32:48	2–2
F. Gauthier (N. Baptiste, C. Bigras) – 36:26	3–2

6 min
Penalties
2 min
12
Shots
35

=== Scoring leaders ===
List shows the top ten skaters sorted by points, then goals.

Player	GP	G	A	Pts	+/−	PIM
(Canada) Connor McDavid	7	8	6	14	+8	2
(Russia) Pavel Buchnevich	7	5	6	11	+4	2
(Russia) Vladimir Tkachyov	7	5	6	11	+5	2
(Russia) Ivan Barbashev	7	3	6	9	+7	4
(Finland) Artturi Lehkonen	7	3	6	9	+2	12
(Finland) Kasperi Kapanen	7	5	3	8	+4	4
(Canada) Nicholas Baptiste	7	3	5	8	+6	4
(Canada) Morgan Klimchuk	7	3	5	8	+4	4
(United States) Tyler Motte	7	5	2	7	+5	4
(Slovakia) Róbert Lantoši	6	4	3	7	−2	0
(Russia) Valeri Nichushkin	6	4	3	7	0	0

GP = Games played; G = Goals; A = Assists; Pts = Points; +/− = Plus–minus; PIM = Penalties in minutes
Source: IIHF.com

=== Leading goaltenders ===
Only the top five goaltenders, based on save percentage, who have played 40% of their team's minutes are included in this list.

Player	TOI	SA	GA	GAA	Sv%	SO
(Canada) Philippe Desrosiers	300:00	130	4	0.80	97.01	2
(Finland) Juuse Saros	419:15	239	13	1.86	94.56	1
(Russia) Igor Shestyorkin	344:31	192	13	2.26	93.66	0
(Sweden) Jonas Johansson	215:42	116	8	2.23	93.10	1
(Slovakia) Dávid Okoličány	196.54	113	10	3.05	91.15	0

TOI = Time On Ice (minutes:seconds); SA = Shots against; GA = Goals against; GAA = Goals against average; Sv% = Save percentage; SO = Shutouts
Source: IIHF.com

=== Tournament Awards ===
Best players selected by the directorate:

- Best Goalkeeper: Juuse Saros (FIN)
- Best Defenseman: Steven Santini (USA)
- Best Forward: Connor McDavid (CAN)

Source: IIHF.com

=== Final standings ===
	Team
1st place, gold medalist(s)	Canada
2nd place, silver medalist(s)	United States
3rd place, bronze medalist(s)	Finland
4th	Russia
5th	Sweden
6th	Switzerland
7th	Czech Republic
8th	Germany
9th	Slovakia
10th	Latvia

Relegated to the 2014 Division I A

2013 IIHF U18 World champions

Canada
Third title

== Division I ==
=== Division I A ===
The Division I A tournament was played in Asiago, Italy, from 7 to 13 April 2013.

Pos	Team	Pld	W	OTW	OTL	L	GF	GA	GD	Pts	Promotion or relegation
1	Denmark	5	4	1	0	0	22	6	+16	14	Promoted to the 2014 Top Division
2	Norway	5	4	0	0	1	31	15	+16	12	
3	Italy	5	2	0	1	2	11	24	−13	7	
4	Belarus	5	2	0	1	2	17	15	+2	7	
5	France	5	1	1	0	3	14	19	−5	5	
6	Slovenia	5	0	0	0	5	8	24	−16	0	Relegated to the 2014 Division I B

Source: IIHF

=== Division I B ===
The Division I B tournament was played in Tychy, Poland, from 14 to 20 April 2013.

Pos	Team	Pld	W	OTW	OTL	L	GF	GA	GD	Pts	Promotion or relegation
1	Kazakhstan	5	5	0	0	0	34	11	+23	15	Promoted to the 2014 Division I A
2	Japan	5	3	0	0	2	23	18	+5	9	
3	Austria	5	3	0	0	2	21	18	+3	9	
4	Poland	5	3	0	0	2	18	21	−3	9	
5	Ukraine	5	1	0	0	4	17	24	−7	3	
6	South Korea	5	0	0	0	5	8	29	−21	0	Relegated to the 2014 Division II A

Source: IIHF

== Division II ==
=== Division II A ===
The Division II A tournament was played in Tallinn, Estonia, from 31 March to 6 April 2013.

Pos	Team	Pld	W	OTW	OTL	L	GF	GA	GD	Pts	Promotion or relegation
1	Hungary	5	4	1	0	0	23	9	+14	14	Promoted to the 2014 Division I B
2	Croatia	5	2	1	1	1	18	12	+6	9	
3	Romania	5	2	0	3	0	13	13	0	9	
4	Great Britain	5	2	1	0	2	17	17	0	8	
5	Lithuania	5	0	2	0	3	17	19	−2	4	
6	Estonia	5	0	0	1	4	13	31	−18	1	Relegated to the 2014 Division II B

Source: IIHF

=== Division II B ===
The Division II B tournament was played in Belgrade, Serbia, from 9 to 15 March 2013.

Pos	Team	Pld	W	OTW	OTL	L	GF	GA	GD	Pts	Promotion or relegation
1	Netherlands	5	5	0	0	0	26	9	+17	15	Promoted to the 2014 Division II A
2	Spain	5	4	0	0	1	22	10	+12	12	
3	Serbia	5	3	0	0	2	18	8	+10	9	
4	Belgium	5	2	0	0	3	15	14	+1	6	
5	Iceland	5	1	0	0	4	8	20	−12	3	
6	Australia	5	0	0	0	5	3	31	−28	0	Relegated to the 2014 Division III A

Source: IIHF

== Division III ==
=== Division III A ===
The Division III A tournament was played in Taipei City, Taiwan, from 11 to 16 March 2013.

Pos	Team	Pld	W	OTW	OTL	L	GF	GA	GD	Pts	Promotion
1	China	4	4	0	0	0	34	3	+31	12	Promoted to the 2014 Division II B
2	New Zealand	4	3	0	0	1	20	12	+8	9	
3	Chinese Taipei	4	2	0	0	2	16	19	−3	6	
4	Bulgaria	4	1	0	0	3	8	32	−24	3	
5	Mexico	4	0	0	0	4	3	15	−12	0	

Source: IIHF

=== Division III B ===
The Division III B tournament was played in İzmit, Turkey, from 7 to 10 February 2013.

Pos	Team	Pld	W	OTW	OTL	L	GF	GA	GD	Pts	Promotion
1	Israel	3	3	0	0	0	25	4	+21	9	Promoted to the 2014 Division III A
2	South Africa	3	2	0	0	1	14	7	+7	6	
3	Turkey	3	1	0	0	2	13	13	0	3	
4	Ireland	3	0	0	0	3	6	34	−28	0	

Source: IIHF
