= 2018 Deutschland Cup =

Tournament details
- Host country: Germany
- Venue: 1 (in 1 host city)
- Dates: 8–11 November
- Teams: 4

Final positions
- Champions: Russia (4th title)
- Runners-up: Switzerland
- Third place: Slovakia
- Fourth place: Germany

Tournament statistics
- Games played: 6
- Goals scored: 30 (5 per game)
- Attendance: 27,960 (4,660 per game)
- Scoring leader: (Switzerland) Christoph Bertschy (5 points)

Official website
- Website

The 2018 Deutschland Cup was the 29th edition of the tournament.

== Standings ==
Pos	Team	Pld	W	OTW	OTL	L	GF	GA	GD	Pts
1	Russia	3	2	1	0	0	10	6	+4	8
2	Switzerland	3	1	1	0	1	9	9	0	5
3	Slovakia	3	1	0	0	2	5	5	0	3
4	Germany	3	0	0	2	1	6	10	−4	2

Source: IIHF
Rules for classification: 1) points; 2) head-to-head points; 3) head-to-head goal difference; 4) head-to-head number of goals scored.

== Results ==
All times are local (UTC+1).

8 November 2018; 15:30	Slovakia	2–3 (1–0, 0–2, 1–1)	Switzerland	König Palast, Krefeld; Attendance: 3,500

Game reference

Jaroslav Janus
Goalies
Gilles Senn
Referees:
(Germany) Marc Iwert
(Germany) André Schrader
Linesmen:
(Germany) Denis Kyei-Nimako
(Germany) Joep Leermakers

Bondra (Sukeľ, Malec) – 01:54	1–0
	1–1	29:03 – Simion (Bertschy)
	1–2	37:53 – Rod (Bertschy)
Haščák (Puliš, Gernát) (PP) – 42:50	2–2
	2–3	47:54 – Pestoni (Bertschy, Fuchs)

8 min
Penalties
6 min
25
Shots
23

8 November 2018; 19:00	Germany	3–4 OT (0–1, 3–1, 0–1) (OT: 0–1)	Russia	König Palast, Krefeld; Attendance: 4,180

Game reference

Mathias Niederberger
Goalies
Igor Bobkov
Referees:
(Germany) Lasse Kopitz
(Germany) Gordon Schukies
Linesmen:
(Germany) Andreas Kowert
(Germany) Robert Schelewski

	0–1	16:08 – Demidov (Chibisov) (SH)
Pföderl (Plachta, Akdag) (PP) – 20:53	1–1
	1–2	23:50 – Yudin (Prokhorkin)
Pfördl (Wolf, Plachta) (PP) – 28:05	2–2
Mauer – 39:38	3–2
	3–3	50:17 – Chibisov (Yudin, Prokhorkin)
	3–4	60:22 – Zemchyonok (Svetlakov, Okulov)

6 min
Penalties
8 min
41
Shots
39

10 November 2018; 13:30	Germany	3–4 GWS (1–2, 0–1, 2–0) (OT: 0–0) (SO: 0–1)	Switzerland	König Palast, Krefeld; Attendance: 6,113

Game reference

Danny aus den Birken
Niklas Treutle
Goalies
Lukas Flüeler
Referees:
(Germany) Stephan Bauer
(Germany) Benjamin Hoppe
Linesmen:
(Germany) Maksim Cepik
(Germany) Jakub Klima

Pföderl (Pietta, Hungerecker) (PP) – 01:27	1–0
	1–1	02:20 – Herren (Martschini, Kreis)
	1–2	09:09 – Rod (Bertschy, Glauser)
	1–3	28:03 – Rod (Fora)
Bergmann (Mauer, Ebner) – 51:32	2–3
Noebels (Sezemsky, Ebner) (EA) – 59:19	3–3

Pfohl (miss)
Pietta (miss)
Bergmann (miss)
Mauer
Shootout
(miss) Richard
Martschini
Herren
8 min
Penalties
8 min
32
Shots
49

10 November 2018; 17:00	Russia	2–1 (1–1, 0–0, 1–0)	Slovakia	König Palast, Krefeld; Attendance: 6,207

Game reference

Vasily Demchenko
Goalies
Jaroslav Janus
Referees:
(Germany) Sirko Hunnius
(Germany) Daniel Kannengießer
Linesmen:
(Germany) Wayne Gerth
(Germany) Patrick Laguzov

	0–1	08:10 – Kudrna (Mikúš)
Mikhailov (Manukyan, Maltsev) – 13:50	1–1
Okulov (Demidov, Svetlakov) (PP) – 41:05	2–1

8 min
Penalties
14 min
29
Shots
24

11 November 2018; 11:00	Switzerland	2–4 (2–1, 0–1, 0–2)	Russia	König Palast, Krefeld; Attendance: 3,665

Game reference

Gilles Senn
Goalies
Igor Bobkov
Referees:
(Germany) Stephan Bauer
(Germany) Daniel Kannengießer
Linesmen:
(Germany) Jakub Klima
(Germany) Patrick Laguzov

	0–1	02:11 – Ilyin (Rafikov, Kayumov) (PP)
Karrer (Riat) (PP) – 11:54	1–1
Bertschy (Kreis) – 17:05	2–1
	2–2	31:16 – Zemchyonok (Tkachyov)
	2–3	43:20 – Abrosimov (Tkachyov, Prokhorkin) (PP)
	2–4	51:38 – Yudin (Prokhorkin, Rafikov)

41 min
Penalties
45 min
27
Shots
40

11 November 2018; 14:30	Germany	0–2 (0–0, 0–0, 0–2)	Slovakia	König Palast, Krefeld; Attendance: 4,295

Game reference
Niklas Treutle	Goalies	Andrej Košarišťan	Referees: (Germany) Benjamin Hoppe (Germany) Sirko Hunnius; Linesmen: (Germany) Maksim Cepik (Germany) Wayne Gerth
0–1 / 54:37 – Haščák (Rapáč, Kytnár); 0–2 / 55:01 – Puliš (Bubela, Šoltés)			Referees: (Germany) Benjamin Hoppe (Germany) Sirko Hunnius; Linesmen: (Germany) Maksim Cepik (Germany) Wayne Gerth
8 min	Penalties	8 min	Referees: (Germany) Benjamin Hoppe (Germany) Sirko Hunnius; Linesmen: (Germany) Maksim Cepik (Germany) Wayne Gerth
34	Shots	38	Referees: (Germany) Benjamin Hoppe (Germany) Sirko Hunnius; Linesmen: (Germany) Maksim Cepik (Germany) Wayne Gerth
