= Alex Lintuniemi =

Finnish ice hockey player

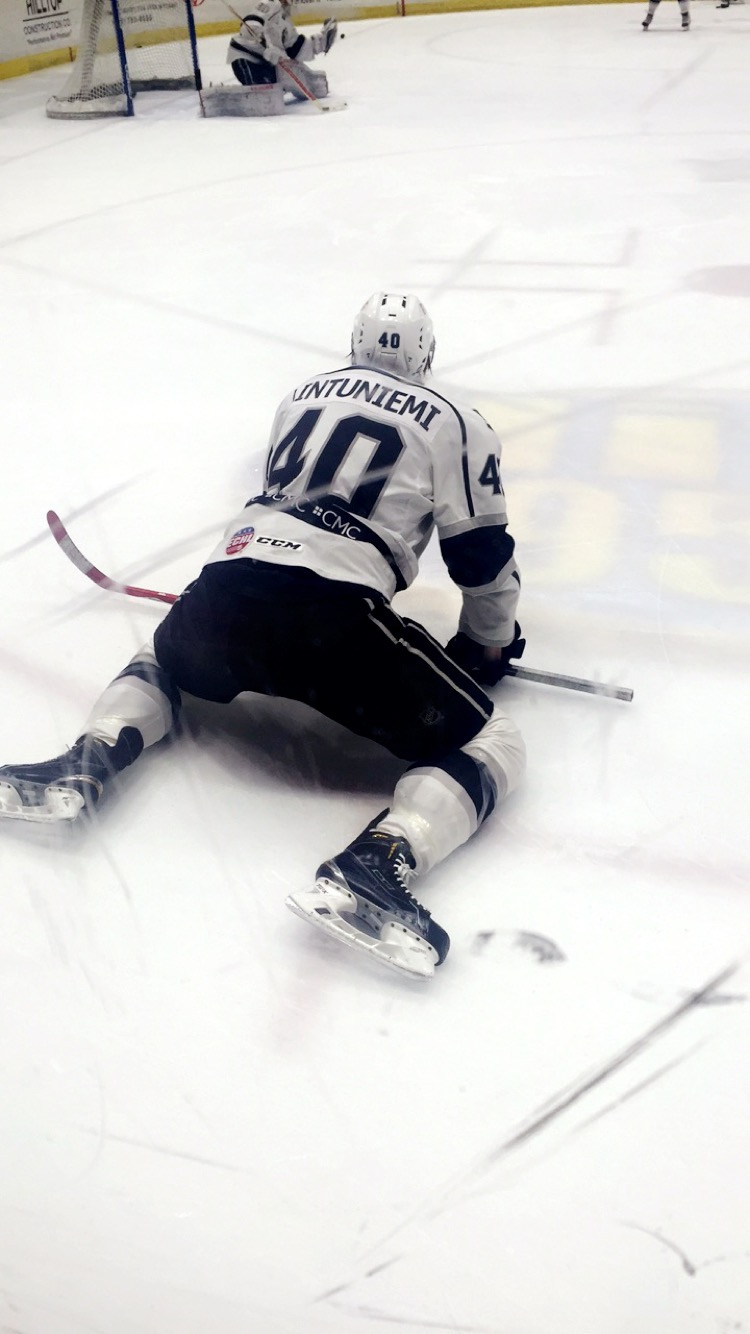
- Luntuniemi with the Manchester Monarchs in 2016
- Born: 23 September 1995 (age 31) Helsinki, Finland
- Height: 6 ft 4 in (193 cm)
- Weight: 231 lb (105 kg; 16 st 7 lb)
- Position: Defence
- Shoots: Left
- ELH team Former teams: BK Mladá Boleslav; Manchester Monarchs; Ontario Reign; Charlotte Checkers; Lahti Pelicans; JYP Jyväskylä; Barys Nur-Sultan; HC Kometa Brno
- NHL draft: 60th overall, 2014; Los Angeles Kings
- Playing career: 2013–present

Alex Lintuniemi (born 23 September 1995) is a Finnish professional ice hockey defenceman for BK Mladá Boleslav of the Czech Extraliga (ELH). He was originally drafted by the Los Angeles Kings, 60th overall, in the 2014 NHL entry draft.

== Playing career ==
Lintuniemi played as a youth in his native Finland within the junior programs of HIFK and Jokerit before he was selected 2 overall in the 2013 CHL Import Draft by the Ottawa 67's of the Ontario Hockey League (OHL).

After his first season of major junior hockey in North America, posting 21 points in 68 games from the blueline, Lintuniemi was selected in the second round, 60th overall, in the 2014 NHL entry draft by the Los Angeles Kings.

In the 2014–15 season, Lintuniemi continued his development with the 67's establishing junior highs of 7 goals and 36 points in 58 games. After a first-round exit in the post-season, Lintuniemi was signed to a three-year, entry-level contract with the Los Angeles Kings on 8 April 2015. He was immediately assigned to join AHL affiliate, the Manchester Monarchs, appearing in 4 regular season games for 1 assist. Lintuniemi remained on the roster through the post-season, practising with the club as they claimed the Calder Cup in their final season in the AHL.

Embarking on his first full professional season in 2015–16 season, Lintuniemi endured a wrist surgery limiting him to just 38 games in remaining with the Manchester Monarchs through their inaugural season in the ECHL. In his second season within the Kings organization, Lintuniemi was elevated to the AHL with the Ontario Reign, posting 10 points in 41 games during the 2016–17 campaign.

In the following 2017–18 season, Lintuniemi established new career highs with 4 goals and 24 points in 64 regular season games with the Reign. As a restricted free agent he was signed to a one-year, two-way extension with the Kings on 19 July 2018. Lintuniemi continued his tenure with the Reign, providing a two-way game while besting his previous season totals with 23 assists and 25 points from 67 games, in his third year on Ontario's blueline.

As an impending restricted free agent, Lintuniemi was not tendered a qualifying offer, releasing him as a free agent from the Los Angeles Kings. On 9 July 2019, he was signed to a one-year, two-way contract with the Carolina Hurricanes.

After attending his first training camp with the Hurricanes, he was assigned to begin the 2019–20 season, with AHL affiliate and defending Calder Cup champions, the Charlotte Checkers. Unable to emerge from the depth on the blueline with the Checkers, Lintuniemi was limited to just 4 games through the first month of the season. With limited NHL prospects, Lintuniemi was placed on unconditional waivers by the Hurricanes in order to mutually terminate his contract on 7 November 2019.

As a free agent, Lintuniemi opted to return to Finland, agreeing to a contract for the remainder of the 2019–20 season with the Lahti Pelicans of the Liiga on 9 November 2019. Lintuniemi made 24 appearances with the Pelicans, posting 6 points, before agreeing to a switch to join fellow Liiga club, JYP Jyväskylä on a multi-year contract, on 3 February 2020.

In the following 2020–21 season, Lintuniemi registered just 1 goal and 4 points through 11 games before opting to leave JYP and the Liiga. He was subsequently signed for the remainder of the season with Kazakhstani based club, Barys Nur-Sultan of the KHL, on 8 December 2020.

== Career statistics ==
=== Regular season and playoffs ===
			Regular season					Playoffs
Season	Team	League	GP	G	A	Pts	PIM	GP	G	A	Pts	PIM
2011–12	Jokerit	Jr. A	3	0	1	1	0	—	—	—	—	—
2012–13	Jokerit	Jr. A	38	4	10	14	76	—	—	—	—	—
2012–13	Kiekko-Vantaa	Mestis	11	1	2	3	6	—	—	—	—	—
2013–14	Ottawa 67's	OHL	68	4	17	21	26	—	—	—	—	—
2014–15	Ottawa 67's	OHL	58	7	29	36	22	6	1	2	3	2
2014–15	Manchester Monarchs	AHL	4	0	1	1	0	—	—	—	—	—
2015–16	Manchester Monarchs	ECHL	38	1	17	18	8	5	0	0	0	0
2016–17	Ontario Reign	AHL	41	2	8	10	6	5	0	0	0	0
2017–18	Ontario Reign	AHL	64	4	20	24	30	4	0	2	2	0
2018–19	Ontario Reign	AHL	67	2	23	25	22	—	—	—	—	—
2019–20	Charlotte Checkers	AHL	4	0	0	0	0	—	—	—	—	—
2019–20	Lahti Pelicans	Liiga	24	2	4	6	28	—	—	—	—	—
2019–20	JYP Jyväskylä	Liiga	9	0	0	0	8	—	—	—	—	—
2020–21	JYP Jyväskylä	Liiga	11	1	3	4	6	—	—	—	—	—
2020–21	Barys Nur-Sultan	KHL	23	0	3	3	8	6	0	1	1	4
2021–22	BK Mladá Boleslav	ELH	33	4	2	6	4	14	1	3	4	0
2021–22	HC Slavia Praha	Czech.1	1	0	2	2	0	—	—	—	—	—
2022–23	BK Mladá Boleslav	ELH	52	4	13	17	24	4	3	0	3	2
2023–24	BK Mladá Boleslav	ELH	27	3	5	8	10	—	—	—	—	—
2023–24	HC Kometa Brno	ELH	21	2	5	7	2	—	—	—	—	—
Liiga totals			44	3	7	10	42	—	—	—	—	—
KHL totals			23	0	3	3	8	6	0	1	1	4

=== International ===
Year	Team	Event	Result	GP	G	A	Pts	PIM
2012	Finland	IH18	2nd place, silver medalist(s)	4	0	1	1	4
2013	Finland	U18	3rd place, bronze medalist(s)	7	0	2	2	8
2015	Finland	WJC	7th	5	0	0	0	2
Junior totals				16	0	3	3	14
