= Morgan Klimchuk =

Canadian ice hockey player (born 1995)

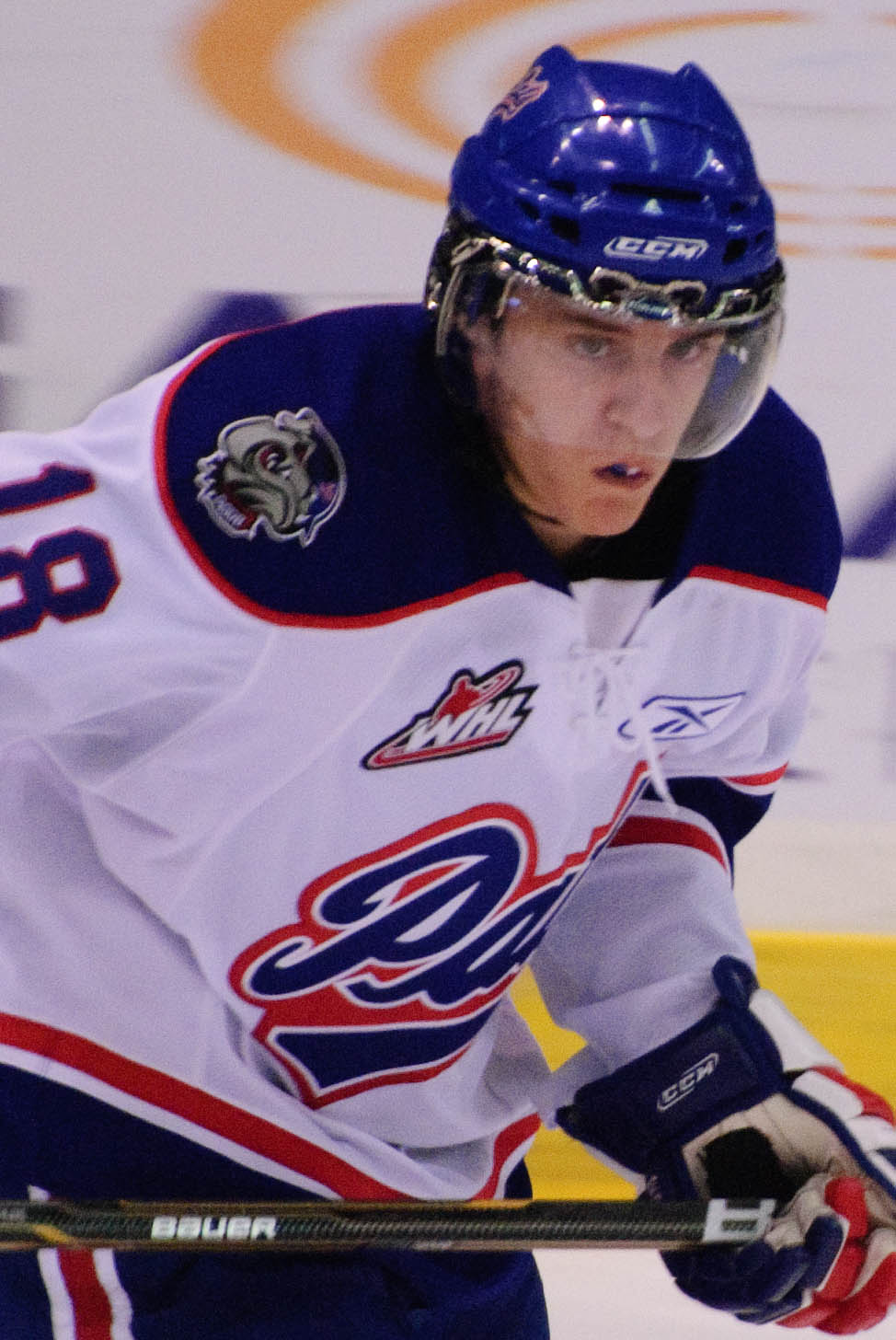
- Klimchuk with the Regina Pats in 2011
- Born: March 2, 1995 (age 31) Regina, Saskatchewan, Canada
- Height: 6 ft 0 in (183 cm)
- Weight: 185 lb (84 kg; 13 st 3 lb)
- Position: Left wing
- Shot: Left
- Played for: Calgary Flames
- NHL draft: 28th overall, 2013; Calgary Flames
- Playing career: 2014–2020

Morgan Klimchuk (born March 2, 1995) is a Canadian former professional ice hockey winger who played with the Calgary Flames in the National Hockey League (NHL). Klimchuk was selected in the first round, 28th overall, at the 2013 NHL entry draft by the Flames.

== Playing career ==
Born in Regina, Saskatchewan in family with Ukrainian roots, Klimchuk grew up in Calgary, Alberta, and played his minor hockey in the Calgary Buffaloes system. He was the captain of his team in the Alberta Major Bantam Hockey League in 2009–10 and led his squad to the final of the Western Canadian Bantam championship, ultimately settling for second place. The Western Hockey League (WHL)'s Regina Pats selected him in the first round, fifth overall, at the 2010 WHL Bantam Draft, and he appeared in five games with the Pats in 2010–11. Klimchuk joined the Pats full-time in 2011–12. He played in 67 games, and his 36 points helped Regina reach the WHL playoffs for the first time since 2008. He was a member of Team Pacific at the 2012 World U-17 Hockey Challenge, finishing second in team scoring with six points in six games, and played with Team Alberta at the 2011 Canada Winter Games.

In his second WHL season, 2012–13, Klimchuk improved to 76 points and finished second in team scoring. He made two appearances with the Canadian national under-18 team. He was a member of the gold medal-winning Canadian team at the 2012 Ivan Hlinka Memorial Tournament. Playing on the top line with Sam Reinhart and Connor McDavid, Klimchuk scored eight points to help lead Canada to a gold medal at the 2013 IIHF World U18 Championships.

Playing all roles in Regina, Klimchuk developed into a top prospect for the 2013 NHL entry draft and was ranked by the NHL Central Scouting Bureau 25th among North American skaters. He credited the chance to play in all offensive and defensive situations with helping him develop a strong two-way game. The Calgary Flames used the pick they acquired in the Jarome Iginla trade to select Klimchuk in the first round, 28th overall. He signed a three-year entry-level contract with the Flames on December 17, 2013.

On January 2, 2015, Klimchuk was dealt from the Pats to the Brandon Wheat Kings, in a trade that saw Jesse Gabrielle move to the Pats.

Klimchuk was invited to the Flames' 2015 training camp, but was assigned to the Flames American Hockey League (AHL) affiliate, the Stockton Heat for the 2015–16 season. Klimchuk made his NHL debut on February 19, 2018, against the Boston Bruins. The following day he was reassigned to the AHL.

During the 2018–19 season, on November 27, 2018, Klimchuk was traded by the Flames to the Toronto Maple Leafs in exchange for Andrew Nielsen. Klimchuk appeared in just 13 games with the Toronto Marlies, before he was traded by the Maple Leafs for the second time within the season to the Ottawa Senators in exchange for Gabriel Gagne on January 11, 2019. He finished the season with Ottawa's AHL affiliate, the Belleville Senators scoring four goals and five points in eight games before a season-ending shoulder injury. The Senators re-signed Klimchuk to a one-year two-way contract on June 13, 2019. He spent the entire 2019–20 season with Belleville.

== Coaching career ==
Klimchuk stopped playing after the 2019–20 season and began coaching. During the 2021–22 season, Klimchuk was an assistant coach with Edge School U15 Prep in the CSSHL. He was named an assistant coach of the WHL's Victoria Royals on August 29, 2022.

== Career statistics ==
=== Regular season and playoffs ===
			Regular season					Playoffs
Season	Team	League	GP	G	A	Pts	PIM	GP	G	A	Pts	PIM
2010–11	Regina Pats	WHL	5	0	1	1	0	—	—	—	—	—
2011–12	Regina Pats	WHL	67	18	18	36	27	5	0	1	1	2
2012–13	Regina Pats	WHL	72	36	40	76	20	—	—	—	—	—
2013–14	Regina Pats	WHL	57	30	44	74	27	4	3	2	5	2
2013–14	Abbotsford Heat	AHL	4	0	0	0	4	—	—	—	—	—
2014–15	Regina Pats	WHL	27	14	16	30	12	—	—	—	—	—
2014–15	Brandon Wheat Kings	WHL	33	20	30	50	12	13	3	10	13	2
2015–16	Stockton Heat	AHL	55	3	6	9	10	—	—	—	—	—
2016–17	Stockton Heat	AHL	66	19	24	43	36	2	0	0	0	0
2017–18	Stockton Heat	AHL	62	19	21	40	24	—	—	—	—	—
2017–18	Calgary Flames	NHL	1	0	0	0	0	—	—	—	—	—
2018–19	Stockton Heat	AHL	17	3	5	8	8	—	—	—	—	—
2018–19	Toronto Marlies	AHL	13	2	0	2	21	—	—	—	—	—
2018–19	Belleville Senators	AHL	8	4	1	5	4	—	—	—	—	—
2019–20	Belleville Senators	AHL	49	12	14	26	14	—	—	—	—	—
NHL totals			1	0	0	0	0	—	—	—	—	—

=== International ===
Year	Team	Event	Result	GP	G	A	Pts	PIM
2013	Canada	WJC18	1st place, gold medalist(s)	7	3	5	8	6
Junior totals				7	3	5	8	6

== Awards and honours ==
Awards	Year
Ivan Hlinka Memorial Tournament gold medal	2012
IIHF World U18 Championship gold medal	2013

Awards and achievements
Preceded by Émile Poirier	Calgary Flames first-round draft pick 2013	Succeeded by Sam Bennett
