= Jason Dickinson =

Canadian ice hockey player (born 1995)

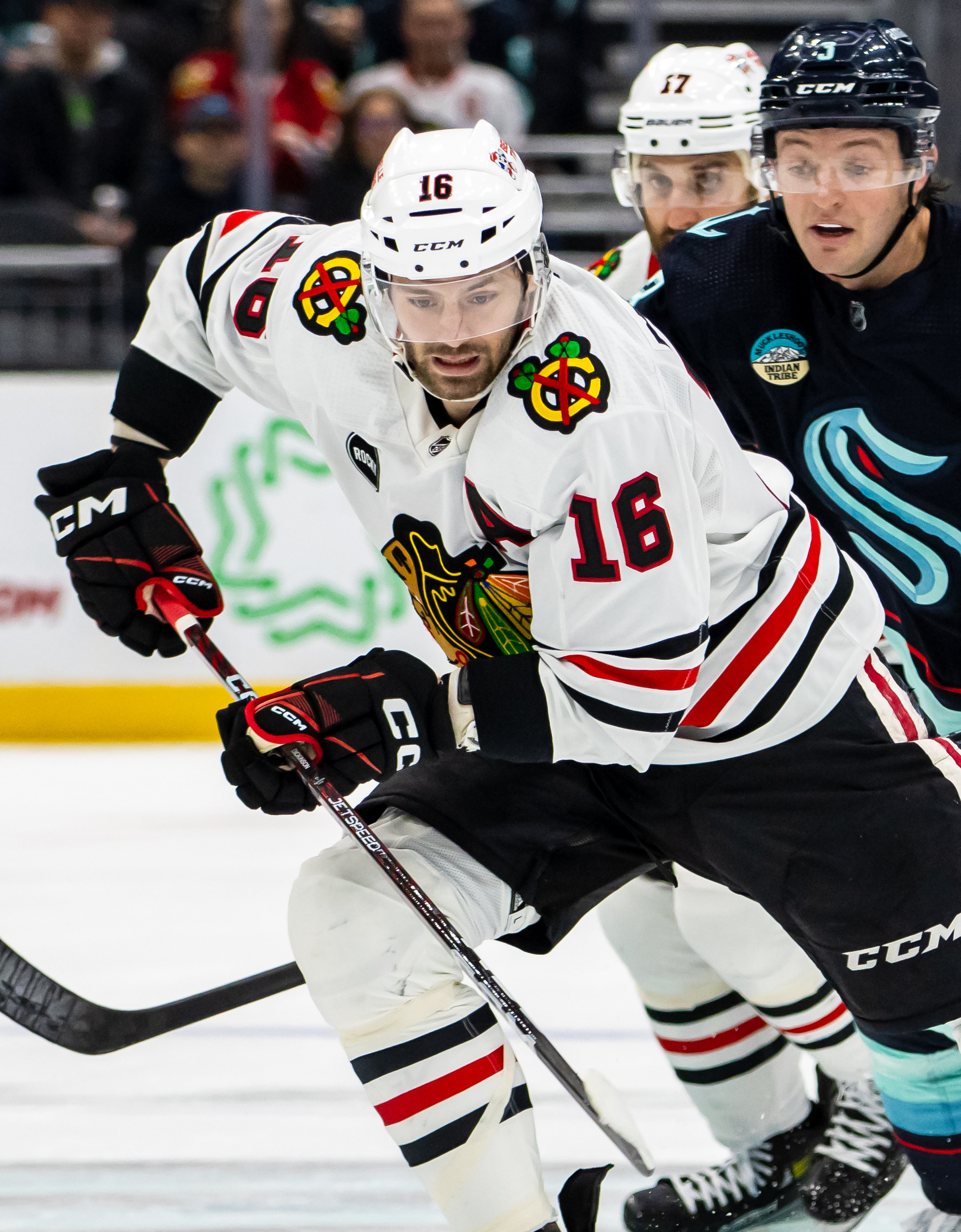
- Dickinson with the Chicago Blackhawks in 2023
- Born: July 4, 1995 (age 31) Georgetown, Ontario, Canada
- Height: 6 ft 2 in (188 cm)
- Weight: 204 lb (93 kg; 14 st 8 lb)
- Position: Centre
- Shoots: Left
- NHL team Former teams: Edmonton Oilers; Dallas Stars; Vancouver Canucks; Chicago Blackhawks
- NHL draft: 29th overall, 2013; Dallas Stars
- Playing career: 2015–present

Jason Dickinson (born July 4, 1995) is a Canadian professional ice hockey player who is a centre for the Edmonton Oilers of the National Hockey League (NHL). He was selected by the Dallas Stars in the first round, 29th overall, of the 2013 NHL entry draft.

== Playing career ==
=== Junior ===
Dickinson was rated as a top prospect who fulfilled the expectation to be a first round selection at the 2013 NHL entry draft, being chosen 29th overall by the Dallas Stars. Dickinson joined the Guelph Storm of the Ontario Hockey League (OHL) for the 2011–12 season and was recognized for his stand-out play when he was named to the OHL Second All-Rookie Team. The following season he was invited to take part in the CHL Top Prospects Game, and was then selected to play with the gold medal-winning Canadian squad at the 2013 IIHF World U18 Championships. In the 2013–14 season, Dickinson helped the Storm capture the OHL championship before losing to the Edmonton Oil Kings in the Memorial Cup finals.

=== Professional ===
==== Dallas Stars (2016–2021) ====
On May 29, 2014, Dickinson signed a three-year, entry-level contract with the Dallas Stars. Upon completion of his junior season, on April 16, 2015, he was assigned to finish the 2014–15 season with Dallas' American Hockey League (AHL) affiliate, the Texas Stars.

On April 7, 2016, in a game against the Colorado Avalanche, Dickinson made his NHL debut and scored his first NHL goal.

==== Vancouver Canucks (2021–2022) ====
Following his sixth year within the Stars organization, at the conclusion of the 2020–21 season, due to expansion draft considerations, Dickinson was traded to the Vancouver Canucks in exchange for a third-round pick in the 2021 NHL entry draft on July 17, 2021. As a restricted free agent, Dickinson agreed to terms on a three-year, $7.95 million contract extension with the Canucks on August 14, 2021.

==== Chicago Blackhawks (2022–2026) ====
Approaching the 2022–23 season, on October 7, 2022, after just one season in Vancouver, Dickinson was traded along with a second-round pick in 2024 to the Chicago Blackhawks in exchange for defenseman Riley Stillman. Dickinson recorded one goal and two assists in his debut with the Blackhawks against the San Jose Sharks on October 15. He finished the season with 9 goals, 21 assists, and a career-high 30 points in 78 games.

He remained with the Blackhawks for the 2023–24 season, where he was a top-six forward, who served as a defensive-minded center. Dickinson recorded his first NHL career hat trick on November 24, 2023, en route to a 4–3 win over the Toronto Maple Leafs. He signed a two-year contract extension with the Blackhawks worth $4.25 million on January 16, 2024. Dickinson concluded the 2023–24 with a career-high 35 points, including a team-leading 22 goals, in 82 games. He was unable to replicate his offensive production during the 2024–25 season, where he only tallied seven goals in 59 games before suffering a season-ending wrist injury on March 22, 2025.

==== Edmonton Oilers (2026–present) ====
On March 4, 2026, Dickinson was traded to the Edmonton Oilers along with Colton Dach in exchange for Andrew Mangiapane and a conditional first-round pick in the 2027 NHL entry draft.

== Activism ==
On August 3, 2020, Ryan Reaves of the Vegas Golden Knights approached Tyler Seguin of the Dallas Stars before the two teams played each other. He told Seguin that he planned to kneel during the anthem. Seguin agreed to join him. Seguin then told the locker room about what he planned to do, and Dickinson volunteered to join him. Reaves, who is Black, and three white players—Seguin, Dickinson, and Knights goalie Robin Lehner—knelt for both the American and Canadian national anthems.

== Personal life ==
Dickinson's younger brother Josh also plays hockey; he signed an entry-level contract with the Colorado Avalanche in 2018. They are of Scottish and Caribbean heritage.

== Career statistics ==
=== Regular season and playoffs ===
			Regular season					Playoffs
Season	Team	League	GP	G	A	Pts	PIM	GP	G	A	Pts	PIM
2011–12	Guelph Storm	OHL	63	13	22	35	24	6	3	2	5	6
2012–13	Guelph Storm	OHL	66	18	29	47	31	5	1	1	2	0
2013–14	Guelph Storm	OHL	68	26	52	78	42	20	8	16	24	6
2014–15	Guelph Storm	OHL	56	27	44	71	32	9	4	4	8	10
2014–15	Texas Stars	AHL	2	0	3	3	0	3	0	0	0	2
2015–16	Texas Stars	AHL	73	22	31	53	32	4	0	1	1	2
2015–16	Dallas Stars	NHL	1	1	0	1	0	—	—	—	—	—
2016–17	Texas Stars	AHL	58	9	21	30	41	—	—	—	—	—
2016–17	Dallas Stars	NHL	10	2	0	2	0	—	—	—	—	—
2017–18	Texas Stars	AHL	42	18	10	28	32	22	2	8	10	4
2017–18	Dallas Stars	NHL	27	0	2	2	17	—	—	—	—	—
2018–19	Dallas Stars	NHL	67	6	16	22	23	13	3	2	5	4
2019–20	Dallas Stars	NHL	65	9	12	21	6	27	2	2	4	8
2020–21	Dallas Stars	NHL	51	7	8	15	18	—	—	—	—	—
2021–22	Vancouver Canucks	NHL	62	5	6	11	19	—	—	—	—	—
2022–23	Chicago Blackhawks	NHL	78	9	21	30	28	—	—	—	—	—
2023–24	Chicago Blackhawks	NHL	82	22	13	35	43	—	—	—	—	—
2024–25	Chicago Blackhawks	NHL	59	7	9	16	38	—	—	—	—	—
2025–26	Chicago Blackhawks	NHL	47	6	7	13	10	—	—	—	—	—
2025–26	Edmonton Oilers	NHL	17	1	3	4	10	4	2	1	3	0
NHL totals			566	75	97	172	212	44	7	5	12	12

=== International ===
Year	Team	Event	Result	GP	G	A	Pts	PIM
2013	Canada	U18	1st place, gold medalist(s)	3	0	1	1	4
Junior totals				3	0	1	1	4

== Awards and honours ==
Honours	Year
OHL Second All-Rookie Team	2011–12
CHL Top Prospects Game	2013
IIHF World U18 Championship Gold Medal	2013

Awards and achievements
Preceded by Valeri Nichushkin	Dallas Stars first-round draft pick 2013	Succeeded by Julius Honka
