= Julius Honka =

Finnish ice hockey player (born 1995)

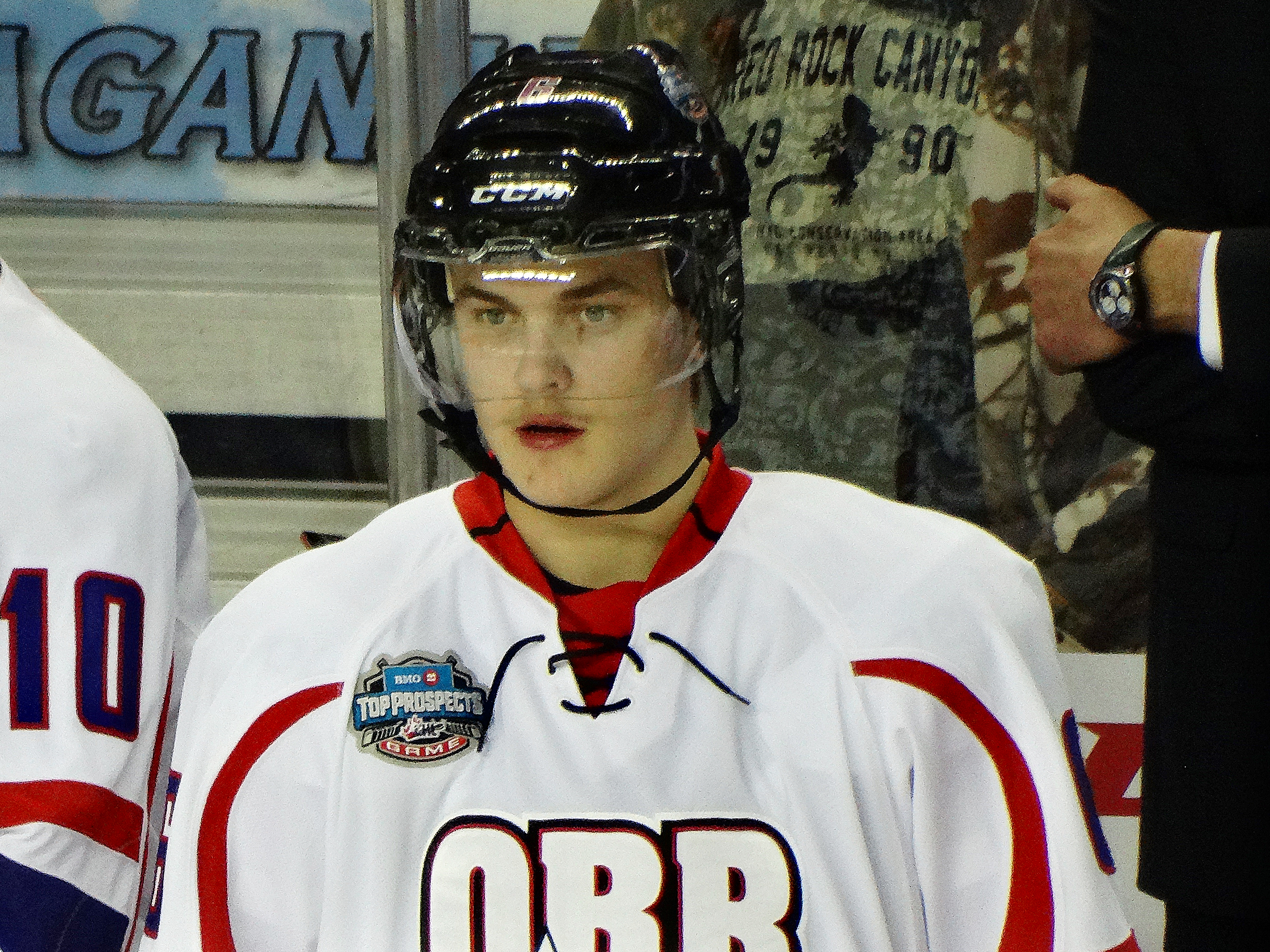
- Honka in 2014
- Born: 3 December 1995 (age 30) Jyväskylä, Finland
- Height: 5 ft 11 in (180 cm)
- Weight: 180 lb (82 kg; 12 st 12 lb)
- Position: Defence
- Shoots: Right
- NL team Former teams: HC Ajoie; Dallas Stars; JYP Jyväskylä; Lahti Pelicans; Luleå HF; SC Bern; Genève-Servette HC; HC Davos; SC Rapperswil-Jona Lakers
- National team: Finland
- NHL draft: 14th overall, 2014; Dallas Stars
- Playing career: 2014–present

Julius Honka (born 3 December 1995) is a Finnish professional ice hockey player who is a defenceman for HC Ajoie of the National League (NL). Honka was selected by the Dallas Stars in the first round, 14th overall, in the 2014 NHL entry draft.

== Playing career ==
Honka was a top rated prospect who was ranked 11th on the NHL Central Scouting Bureau final list of 2014 NHL draft-eligible North American skaters.

During the 2012–13 season Honka played with the Finland men's national under-18 ice hockey team at both the 2013 IIHF World U18 Championships and the 2013 Ivan Hlinka Memorial Tournament. Moving to North America for the 2013–14 season, he competed with Team Finland to win gold at the 2014 World Junior Ice Hockey Championships and was also selected to compete in the 2014 CHL/NHL Top Prospects Game.

On 14 July 2014, Honka was signed to a three-year entry-level contract with the Dallas Stars. During the 2016–17 season, Honka scored his first career goal on 4 April 2017, a game winning overtime goal in a game against the Arizona Coyotes.

In the following 2017–18 season, Honka was sent down to the Stars AHL affiliate, the Texas Stars, on 31 October 2017. He was later recalled and remained with Dallas to appear in a career high 42 games.

Unable to cement a role at the NHL level within the Stars' blueline, Honka as a pending restricted free agent formally requested a trade from the Stars in September 2019. Unable to facilitate a satisfactory trade during the off-season, on 10 October 2019, Honka signed a contract with his original Finnish club, JYP Jyväskylä of the Liiga. As a restricted free agent, the Dallas Stars would retain his rights. In the 2019–20 season, making his top level Liiga debut, Honka contributed with 4 goals and 15 points through 46 regular season games before the post-season was cancelled due to the COVID-19 pandemic.

On 30 October 2020, Honka returned to the Dallas Stars organization after he was signed to a one-year, two-way contract worth $700,000 at the NHL level and $90,000 at the AHL level. Honka was placed on waivers by the Stars on 20 January 2021. After going unclaimed Honka was reassigned by Dallas to Texas appearing in 17 games at the AHL level.

Unable to further his NHL career, Honka returned to Europe and signed a two-year contract with Swedish club, Luleå HF of the Swedish Hockey League (SHL), on 26 May 2021.

== Personal life ==
Honka comes from a family of hockey players; his three brothers also play the same sport. His younger brother Anttoni was drafted in the third round (83rd overall) by the Carolina Hurricanes in the 2019 NHL entry draft and currently plays for JYP Jyväskylä of Finland's Liiga.

== Career statistics ==
=== Regular season and playoffs ===
| | | | Regular season | | | | | Playoffs |
| Season | Team | League | GP | G | A | Pts | PIM | GP | G | A | Pts | PIM |
|---|---|---|---|---|---|---|---|---|---|---|---|---|
| 2011–12 | JYP | FIN U18 | 26 | 6 | 7 | 13 | 16 | — | — | — | — | — |
| 2011–12 | JYP | FIN U20 | 2 | 0 | 0 | 0 | 0 | — | — | — | — | — |
| 2012–13 | JYP | FIN U20 | 42 | 4 | 11 | 15 | 47 | 4 | 0 | 0 | 0 | 25 |
| 2013–14 | Swift Current Broncos | WHL | 62 | 16 | 40 | 56 | 52 | 6 | 2 | 0 | 2 | 6 |
| 2014–15 | Texas Stars | AHL | 68 | 8 | 23 | 31 | 55 | 3 | 1 | 1 | 2 | 4 |
| 2015–16 | Texas Stars | AHL | 73 | 11 | 33 | 44 | 38 | 4 | 0 | 1 | 1 | 4 |
| 2016–17 | Texas Stars | AHL | 50 | 7 | 24 | 31 | 59 | — | — | — | — | — |
| 2016–17 | Dallas Stars | NHL | 16 | 1 | 4 | 5 | 4 | — | — | — | — | — |
| 2017–18 | Dallas Stars | NHL | 42 | 1 | 3 | 4 | 14 | — | — | — | — | — |
| 2017–18 | Texas Stars | AHL | 10 | 0 | 2 | 2 | 6 | — | — | — | — | — |
| 2018–19 | Dallas Stars | NHL | 29 | 0 | 4 | 4 | 10 | — | — | — | — | — |
| 2019–20 | JYP | Liiga | 46 | 4 | 11 | 15 | 16 | — | — | — | — | — |
| 2020–21 | Pelicans | Liiga | 9 | 3 | 4 | 7 | 4 | — | — | — | — | — |
| 2020–21 | Texas Stars | AHL | 17 | 1 | 4 | 5 | 6 | — | — | — | — | — |
| 2021–22 | Luleå HF | SHL | 46 | 10 | 11 | 21 | 22 | 17 | 4 | 4 | 8 | 6 |
| 2022–23 | Luleå HF | SHL | 46 | 12 | 15 | 27 | 41 | 10 | 2 | 2 | 4 | 4 |
| 2023–24 | SC Bern | NL | 25 | 3 | 9 | 12 | 14 | 4 | 0 | 2 | 2 | 2 |
| 2023–24 | Genève-Servette HC | NL | 18 | 2 | 7 | 9 | 2 | — | — | — | — | — |
| 2024–25 | HC Davos | NL | 46 | 9 | 15 | 24 | 10 | 5 | 0 | 0 | 0 | 0 |
| 2025–26 | SC Rapperswil-Jona Lakers | NL | 36 | 6 | 13 | 19 | 39 | — | — | — | — | — |
| NHL totals | | | 87 | 2 | 11 | 13 | 28 | — | — | — | — | — |
| Liiga totals | | | 55 | 7 | 15 | 22 | 20 | — | — | — | — | — |
| SHL totals | | | 92 | 22 | 26 | 48 | 63 | 27 | 6 | 6 | 12 | 10 |
| NL totals | | | 125 | 20 | 44 | 64 | 65 | 9 | 0 | 2 | 2 | 2 |

Medal record

Ice hockey

Representing Finland

World Junior Championships
| Gold medal – first place | 2014 Malmö | |

World U18 Championships
| Bronze medal – third place | 2013 Sochi | |

=== International ===
| Year | Team | Event | Result | GP | G | A | Pts | PIM |
|---|---|---|---|---|---|---|---|---|
| 2012 | Finland | IH18 | 2nd place, silver medalist(s) | 5 | 0 | 2 | 2 | 4 |
| 2013 | Finland | WJC18 | 3rd place, bronze medalist(s) | 7 | 1 | 3 | 4 | 2 |
| 2014 | Finland | WJC | 1st place, gold medalist(s) | 7 | 0 | 1 | 1 | 6 |
| 2015 | Finland | WJC | 7th | 5 | 1 | 1 | 2 | 6 |
| 2017 | Finland | WC | 4th | 10 | 1 | 2 | 3 | 4 |
| 2018 | Finland | WC | 5th | 8 | 0 | 1 | 1 | 0 |
| Junior totals | | | | 24 | 2 | 7 | 9 | 18 |
| Senior totals | | | | 18 | 1 | 3 | 4 | 4 |

== Awards and honours ==
| Awards | Year |
WHL
| CHL/NHL Top Prospects Game | 2013–14 |
International
| IIHF World U18 Championship | 2013 |
| Ivan Hlinka Memorial Tournament | 2013 |
| IIHF World U20 Championship gold medal | 2014 |

Awards and achievements
| Preceded by Jason Dickinson | Dallas Stars first-round draft pick 2014 | Succeeded by Denis Gurianov |
