= Madison Bowey =

Canadian ice hockey player (born 1995)

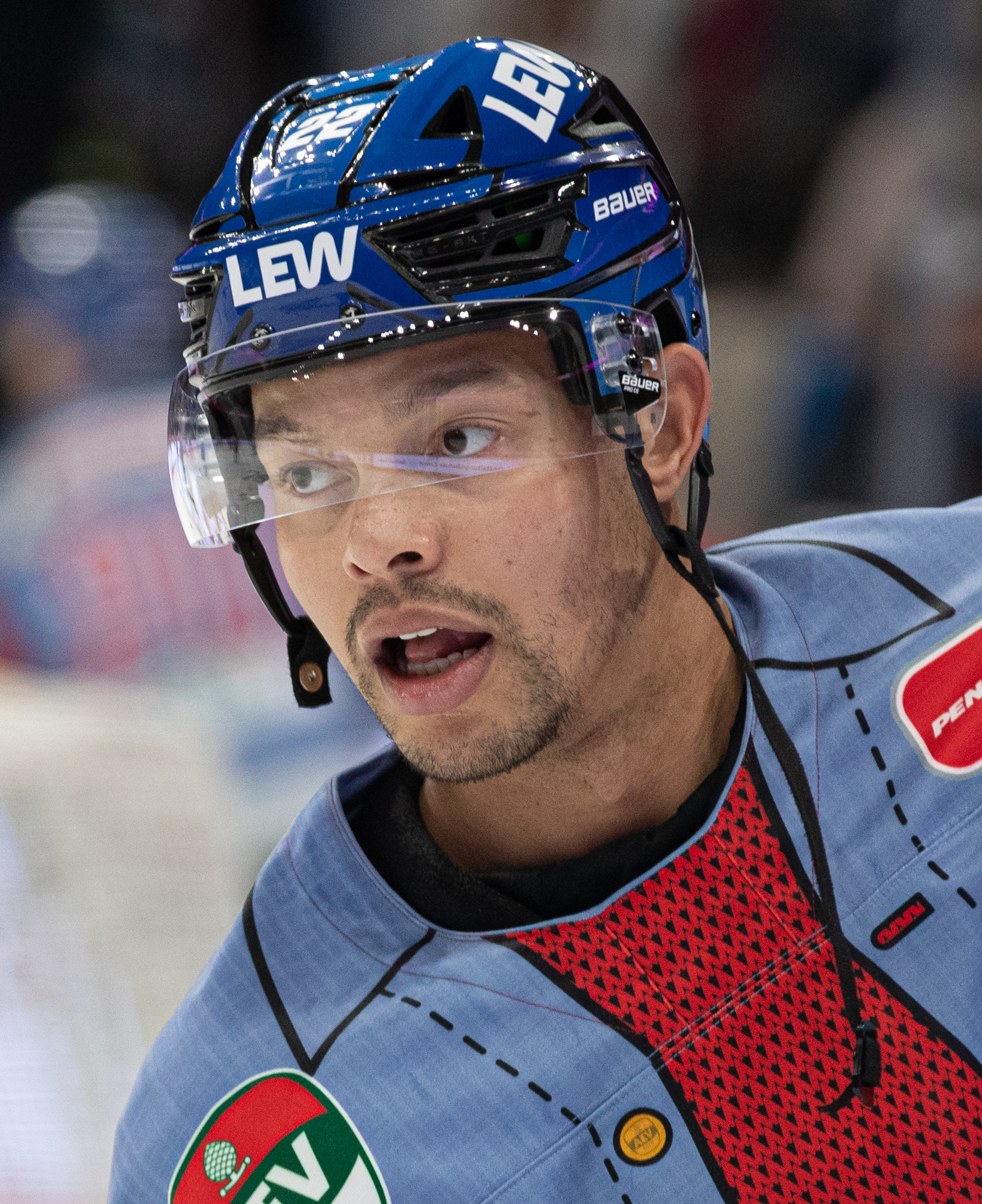
- Bowey with the Augsburger Panther in October 2025
- Born: April 22, 1995 (age 31) Winnipeg, Manitoba, Canada
- Height: 6 ft 2 in (188 cm)
- Weight: 198 lb (90 kg; 14 st 2 lb)
- Position: Defence
- Shoots: Right
- DEL team Former teams: Augsburger Panther; Washington Capitals; Detroit Red Wings; Chicago Blackhawks; Vancouver Canucks; Dinamo Minsk; Traktor Chelyabinsk; Torpedo Nizhny Novgorod
- NHL draft: 53rd overall, 2013; Washington Capitals
- Playing career: 2015–present

Madison Bowey (born April 22, 1995) is a Canadian professional ice hockey defenceman who is currently playing for the Augsburger Panther of the German Ice Hockey League (DEL). He was selected in the second round, 53rd overall, by the Washington Capitals of the National Hockey League (NHL) in the 2013 NHL entry draft, and won the Stanley Cup with the Capitals in 2018. Bowey has also previously played for the Detroit Red Wings, Chicago Blackhawks, and Vancouver Canucks.

== Playing career ==
=== Junior ===
Bowey was selected by the Kelowna Rockets in the second round, 23rd overall, in the 2010 WHL Bantam Draft. He appeared in 3 games at the end of Kelowna's 2010–11 WHL season, recording one assist. The next year he emerged as a mainstay on the Rockets' blue line, putting up 8 goals and 21 points in 57 games with a +3 rating and 39 PIM. He also scored a goal in 4 games in Kelowna's first round sweep at the hands of the Portland Winterhawks. Bowey also represented Team Canada West at the 2012 World U-17 Hockey Challenge, recording a goal in 5 games. During the 2012–13 WHL season Bowey emerged as one of Kelowna's most valuable defenders, scoring 12 goals and 30 points in 69 games with a +41 rating. His plus-minus rating that season was good for thirteenth amongst WHL players that season, and he solidified his status as a major NHL prospect for the 2013 NHL entry draft. He helped lead the Rockets to a division title and a seven-game first-round post-season victory over the Seattle Thunderbirds before being defeated by the arch rival Kamloops Blazers in the second round. Bowey recorded 4 assists in 11 total playoff games.

In the 2013–14 WHL season with Kelowna, Bowey scored 25 points in his first 25 games, demonstrating his development into a solid two-way defenceman.

=== Professional ===
==== Washington Capitals ====
On April 2, 2014, the Washington Capitals of the National Hockey League (NHL) signed Bowey to a three-year, entry-level contract to begin with the 2014–15 NHL season.

On October 14, 2017, Bowey was recalled from the Hershey Bears to replace Matt Niskanen who was placed on injured reserve. On October 26, 2017, he earned his first NHL point on an assist for Chandler Stephenson's first NHL goal in a 6–2 loss against the Vancouver Canucks. On June 7, 2018, Bowey won his first Stanley Cup with the Washington Capitals after defeating the Vegas Golden Knights in five games to capture the first Stanley Cup in the history of their franchise. Although Bowey did not play in the playoffs, he still met the regular season games played requirement to have his name engraved on the Stanley Cup.

In the following 2018–19 season, Bowey made the opening night roster for the first time in his career. On December 29, in a 3–2 win over the Ottawa Senators, both Bowey and fellow rookie defenseman Tyler Lewington recorded their first NHL goals, making the two players the first defensemen in Capitals history to score their first NHL goals in the same game. Bowey recorded six points in 33 games for the Capitals.

==== Detroit Red Wings ====
On February 22, 2019, the Capitals traded Bowey to the Detroit Red Wings, along with a second-round pick in the 2020 NHL entry draft, in exchange for Nick Jensen, and a fifth-round pick in the 2019 NHL entry draft.

He scored his first goal with the Red Wings on March 14 against the Tampa Bay Lightning.

==== Chicago Blackhawks ====
After going unsigned at the beginning of the 2020–21 season, Bowey initially signed a professional try-out (PTO) with the San Diego Gulls, the AHL affiliate of the Anaheim Ducks, on January 21, 2021. Bowey left the Gulls mid training camp after he was signed to a two-year, $1.45 million contract by the Chicago Blackhawks on January 28, 2021.

==== Vancouver Canucks ====
On April 12, 2021, during the 2021 NHL Trade Deadline, Bowey and a 2021 fifth-round pick were traded to the Vancouver Canucks in exchange for a 2021 fourth-round pick.

==== Montreal Canadiens ====
As a free agent from the Canucks, Bowey was signed to a one-year, two-way contract with the Montreal Canadiens on July 13, 2022.

==== KHL ====
Without a contract offer prior to the start of the 2023–24 NHL season, Bowey opted to sign overseas, inking a one-year deal with Belarus based Dinamo Minsk of the KHL on August 31, 2023. Bowey opened the season with Minsk, making 8 appearances from the blueline posting 2 assists, before he was traded to Russian club, Traktor Chelyabinsk, in exchange for Rob Hamilton on October 1, 2023. On December 27, 2023 he was traded to another Russian club, Torpedo Nizhny Novgorod.

==== Cleveland Monsters ====
Following a season abroad, Bowey returned to North America for the 2024–25 season in signing an initial professional try-out contract with the Cleveland Monsters of the AHL, the primary affiliate to the Columbus Blue Jackets, on October 10, 2024.

==== Germany ====
On July 4, 2025, Bowey returned to Europe, signing a one-year contract with the Augsburger Panther of the German Ice Hockey League.

== International play ==
Medal record

Representing Canada

Ice hockey

Ivan Hlinka Memorial Tournament
Gold medal – first place	2012 Piešťany	

IIHF World U18 Championship
Gold medal – first place	2013 Russia	

IIHF World U20 Championship
Gold medal – first place	2015 Canada	

Bowey represented the Canada men's national under-18 ice hockey team at the 2012 Ivan Hlinka Memorial Tournament, helping contribute to a Gold Medal placing. At the 2013 IIHF World U18 Championships, Bowey scored the tying goal against the United States in the gold medal match before teammate Frédérik Gauthier scored the game-winner in a 3-2 victory over the heavily favoured American squad. He ended up scoring 2 goals and 4 points in 7 games with a +3 rating over the course of the tournament for the Canadians.

== Career statistics ==
=== Regular season and playoffs ===
			Regular season					Playoffs
Season	Team	League	GP	G	A	Pts	PIM	GP	G	A	Pts	PIM
2010–11	Winnipeg Wild	MMHL	41	16	22	38	35	6	2	0	2	10
2010–11	Kelowna Rockets	WHL	3	0	1	1	4	1	0	0	0	0
2011–12	Kelowna Rockets	WHL	57	8	13	21	39	4	1	0	1	4
2012–13	Kelowna Rockets	WHL	69	12	18	30	75	11	0	4	4	14
2013–14	Kelowna Rockets	WHL	72	21	39	60	93	14	5	9	14	14
2014–15	Kelowna Rockets	WHL	58	17	43	60	66	19	7	12	19	24
2015–16	Hershey Bears	AHL	70	4	25	29	58	21	0	6	6	35
2016–17	Hershey Bears	AHL	34	3	11	14	28	10	2	2	4	6
2017–18	Hershey Bears	AHL	9	2	6	8	6	—	—	—	—	—
2017–18	Washington Capitals	NHL	51	0	12	12	24	—	—	—	—	—
2018–19	Washington Capitals	NHL	33	1	5	6	38	—	—	—	—	—
2018–19	Detroit Red Wings	NHL	17	1	3	4	8	—	—	—	—	—
2019–20	Detroit Red Wings	NHL	53	3	14	17	34	—	—	—	—	—
2019–20	Grand Rapids Griffins	AHL	1	0	1	1	2	—	—	—	—	—
2020–21	Chicago Blackhawks	NHL	2	0	1	1	0	—	—	—	—	—
2020–21	Rockford IceHogs	AHL	2	0	0	0	6	—	—	—	—	—
2021–22	Abbotsford Canucks	AHL	53	8	20	28	80	2	0	0	0	2
2021–22	Vancouver Canucks	NHL	2	0	0	0	0	—	—	—	—	—
2022–23	Laval Rocket	AHL	35	4	9	13	24	—	—	—	—	—
2023–24	Dinamo Minsk	KHL	8	0	2	2	15	—	—	—	—	—
2023–24	Traktor Chelyabinsk	KHL	22	2	5	7	31	—	—	—	—	—
2023–24	Torpedo Nizhny Novgorod	KHL	21	2	3	5	4	—	—	—	—	—
2024–25	Cleveland Monsters	AHL	60	3	12	15	70	3	0	3	3	2
NHL totals			158	5	35	40	104	—	—	—	—	—
KHL totals			51	4	10	14	50	—	—	—	—	—

=== International ===
Year	Team	Event	Result	GP	G	A	Pts	PIM
2012	Canada Western	U17	10th	5	1	0	1	6
2012	Canada	IH18	1st place, gold medalist(s)	5	0	1	1	6
2013	Canada	U18	1st place, gold medalist(s)	7	2	2	4	6
2015	Canada	WJC	1st place, gold medalist(s)	7	1	3	4	2
Junior totals				24	4	6	10	20

== Awards and honours ==
Award	Year
WHL
CHL Top Prospects Game	2013
West Second All-Star Team	2014
West First All-Star Team	2015
Ed Chynoweth Cup Champion	2015
Memorial Cup All-Star Team	2015
NHL
Stanley Cup champion	2018

== See also ==
- Black players in ice hockey
