= Patrik Bačík =

Slovak ice hockey player

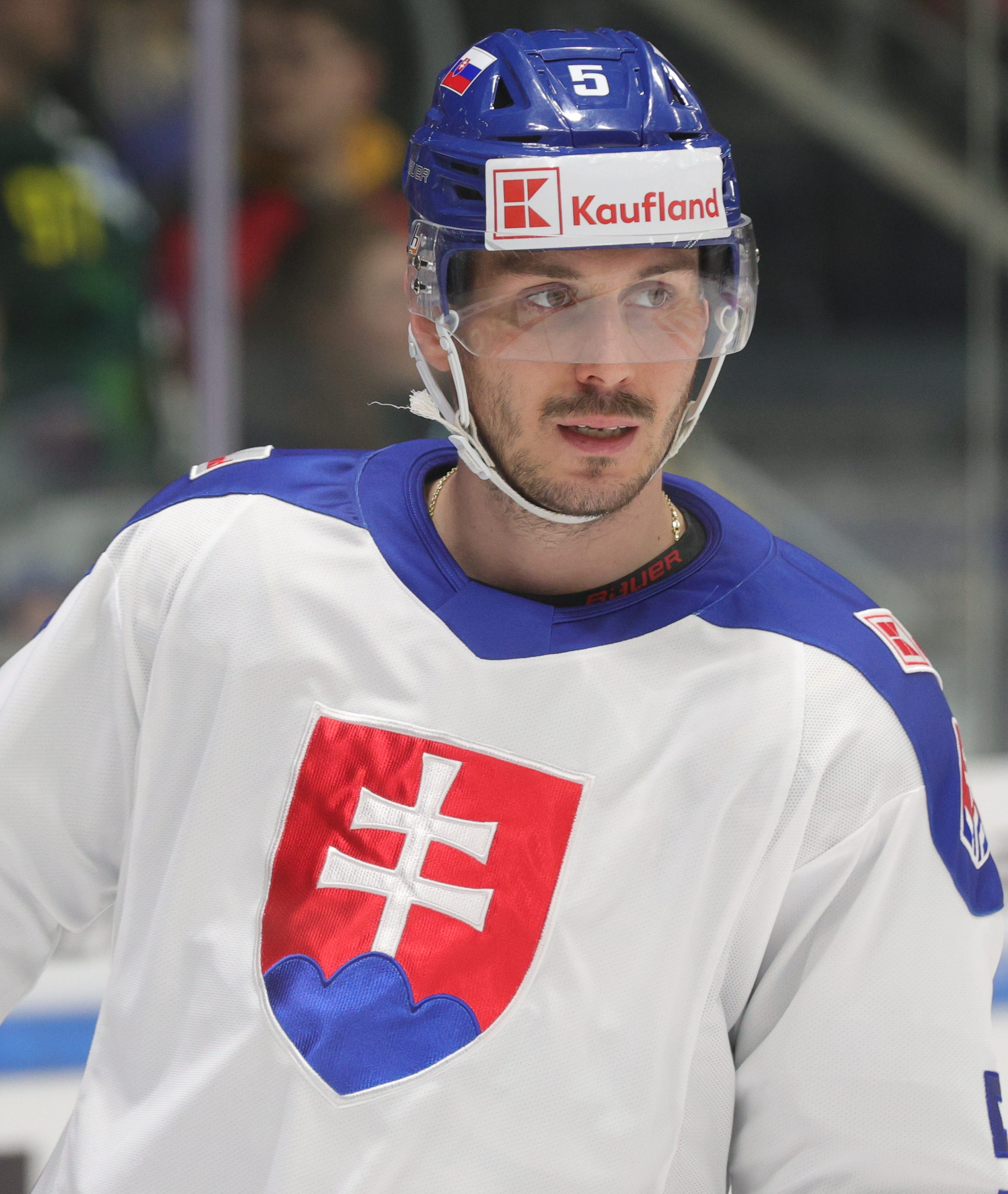
- Patrik Bačík, 2024
- Born: 7 February 1995 (age 31) Bratislava, Slovakia
- Height: 6 ft 1 in (185 cm)
- Weight: 187 lb (85 kg; 13 st 5 lb)
- Position: Defence
- Shoots: Left
- Slovak team Former teams: HC Slovan Bratislava; HC '05 Banská Bystrica; HK Orange 20; HK Nitra; MHC Martin; HK Dukla Trenčín; Modré krídla Slovan
- Playing career: 2013–present
Medal record
Representing Slovakia
Ice hockey
IIHF World U20 Championship
Bronze medal – third place	2015 Canada

Patrik Bačík (born 7 February 1995) is a Slovak professional ice hockey defenceman for HC Slovan Bratislava of the Slovak Extraliga.

== Early life ==
Bačík was born in Bratislava. He began playing as a member of Slovan Bratislava's academy.

== Career ==
Bačík made his Slovak Extraliga debut with Slovakia men's national junior ice hockey team during the 2013–14 season. He also played for HK Nitra and MHC Martin before returning to Slovan Bratislava in the Kontinental Hockey League. Bačík played in 138 games in the KHL, during which he was a member of the Tipsport Liga for MHC Martin, HK Dukla Trenčín and HC '05 Banská Bystrica.

On July 21, 2019, Bačík signed a new contract with Slovan Bratislava, who by this point had left the KHL and announced their intention to return to the Tipsport Liga.

== Career statistics ==
=== Regular season and playoffs ===
			Regular season					Playoffs
Season	Team	League	GP	G	A	Pts	PIM	GP	G	A	Pts	PIM
KHL totals			138	1	6	7	101	—	—	—	—	—
Slovak totals			180	8	36	44	120	30	0	2	2	40

=== International ===
Year	Team	Event	Result	GP	G	A	Pts	PIM
2013	Slovakia	WJC18	9th	6	1	1	2	10
2015	Slovakia	WJC	3rd place, bronze medalist(s)	7	0	0	0	0
Junior totals				13	1	1	2	10
