= Chris Bigras =

Canadian ice hockey player (born 1995)

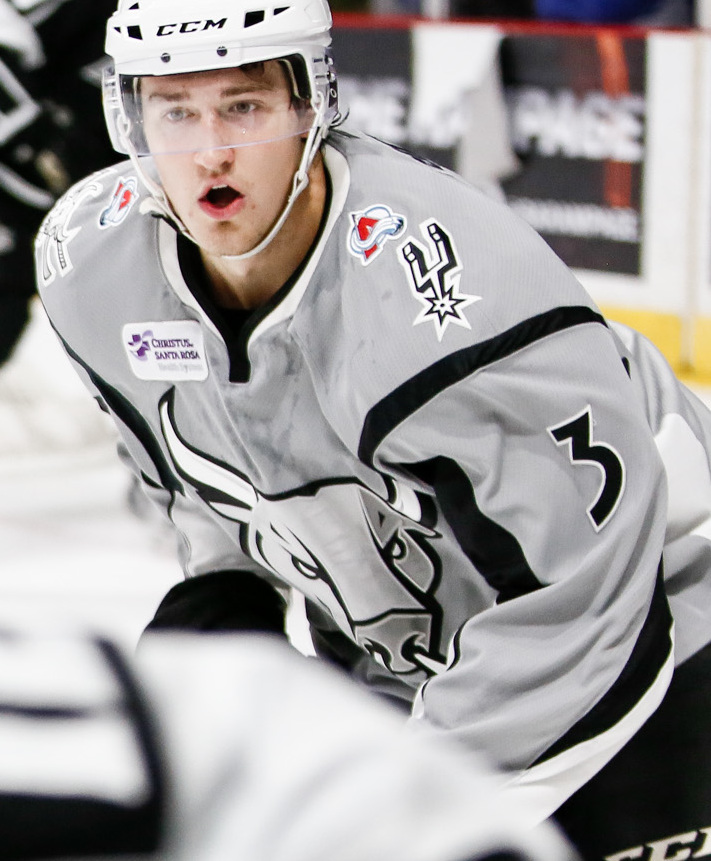
- Bigras with the San Antonio Rampage in 2015
- Born: February 22, 1995 (age 31) Orillia, Ontario, Canada
- Height: 5 ft 9 in (175 cm)
- Weight: 190 lb (86 kg; 13 st 8 lb)
- Position: Defence
- Shot: Left
- Played for: Colorado Avalanche; Barys Astana; Iserlohn Roosters
- NHL draft: 32nd overall, 2013; Colorado Avalanche
- Playing career: 2015–2023

Christopher Bigras (born February 22, 1995) is a Canadian former professional ice hockey defenceman. Bigras was selected by the Colorado Avalanche in the second round (32nd overall) of the 2013 NHL entry draft. He was born in Orillia, Ontario, but grew up in Elmvale, Ontario.

== Playing career ==
=== Junior ===
As a youth, Bigras played in the 2008 Quebec International Pee-Wee Hockey Tournament with the Barrie Colts minor ice hockey team. He later played junior ice hockey with the Owen Sound Attack in the Ontario Hockey League. During the 2012–13 season he played with Team Canada to win gold medals at both the 2012 Ivan Hlinka Memorial Tournament and the 2013 IIHF World U18 Championships. He was rated as a top prospect eligible for the 2013 NHL entry draft before he was selected by the Avalanche.

During his first training camp with the Avalanche, Bigras impressed immediately from the blueline and was signed to a three-year entry-level contract with the Avalanche on September 17, 2013. His performance was praised by head coach Patrick Roy and as a result, he was amongst the final cuts in being returned to the Attack of the OHL for the 2013–14 season. Bigras was named as an Alternate captain and although failing to reproduce his previous season offensive numbers with a weaker Owen Sound squad, he was voted by the league's coaches as the OHL best defensive defenseman.

Over the summer, Bigras attended Canada's National junior development camp before participating in his second training camp with the Avalanche. Bigras failed to replicate his form from his initial camp and was reassigned to Owen Sound at the conclusion of camp. In his last season of junior in 2014–15, Bigras was relied upon as the Attack's number one defenseman. He continued his development to break out offensively in leading all blueline teammates in each scoring category with 20 goals, 51 assists and 71 points in 62 games, finishing second in the OHL. He earned selection to the OHL First All-Star team and surpassed Owen Sound All-time scoring records in leading the club amongst defenseman with 120 assists and 155 points in his junior career.

=== Professional ===
After a first round defeat in the post-season signalling the conclusion of his OHL career, Bigras was signed to an amateur try-out contract with the Avalanche's AHL affiliate, the Lake Erie Monsters on April 7, 2015, and made his debut that night against the Chicago Wolves. Bigras recorded his first professional point, an assist, in the following game against the Rochester Americans on April 9. With the Monsters out of playoff contention, he finished the campaign with 4 assists in 7 games.

Bigras was assigned to begin his first full professional season in 2015–16 season, with new Avalanche AHL affiliate, the San Antonio Rampage. He established himself amongst top-pairing minutes with the Rampage, appearing in every contest and placing second amongst the defense in scoring before he received his first NHL recall to the Avalanche on January 13, 2016. Bigras made his NHL debut with the Avalanche in a 3–0 victory over the New Jersey Devils on January 14, 2016. He collected his first NHL point on an assist in the following game against the Columbus Blue Jackets on January 16. Bigras was initially placed on the third pairing to continue his development, showing his defensive prowess, before scoring his first NHL goal in his 21st game in a 6–3 defeat to the Minnesota Wild on February 2, 2016.

In the 2017–18 season, Bigras made the Avalanche opening night roster out of training camp. He appeared in 15 games with the Avalanche, registering a lone assist before he was reassigned to the San Antonio Rampage on November 28, 2017. Bigras suffered an injury with the Rampage and was limited to 20 games before he was dealt by the Avalanche at the NHL trade deadline to the New York Rangers in exchange for Ryan Graves on February 26, 2018.

Following the conclusion of his contract with the Rangers, Bigras was not tendered a qualifying offer and was released as a free agent on June 25, 2019. Bigras was signed to a two-year, two-way contract with the Philadelphia Flyers on July 1, 2019.

Having left the Flyers organization at the conclusion of his contract, Bigras was signed by the Wilkes-Barre/Scranton Penguins to a one-year contract to extend his career in the AHL on August 12, 2021. In the 2021–22 season, Bigras appeared in 28 games with the Penguins, collecting 3 goals and 10 points. On March 28, 2022, Bigras was traded in the AHL by Wilkes-Barre/Scranton to the Chicago Wolves, the primary affiliate to the Carolina Hurricanes, in exchange for future considerations. Bigras made 12 regular season appearances with the Wolves, registering 3 points, remaining on the roster in the playoffs as the Wolves captured the Calder Cup.

As a free agent, Bigras opted to sign his first contract abroad after agreeing to a one-year contract with Kazakhstan based club, Barys Astana of the KHL, on August 3, 2022. In the 2022–23 season, Bigras struggled to adapt with Barys, registering just 1 assist through 23 regular season games before opting to terminate his contract on November 3, 2022.

Remaining in Europe, Bigras was signed for the remainder of the season with German club, Iserlohn Roosters of the Deutsche Eishockey Liga (DEL), on December 13, 2022. Bigras contributed with 7 points in 28 games from the blueline before he left the club at the conclusion of his contract on March 10, 2023.

== Career statistics ==
=== Regular season and playoffs ===
			Regular season					Playoffs
Season	Team	League	GP	G	A	Pts	PIM	GP	G	A	Pts	PIM
2011–12	Owen Sound Attack	OHL	49	3	16	19	33	5	2	3	5	0
2012–13	Owen Sound Attack	OHL	68	8	30	38	34	12	0	2	2	8
2013–14	Owen Sound Attack	OHL	55	4	22	26	46	5	1	2	3	4
2014–15	Owen Sound Attack	OHL	62	20	51	71	52	5	1	2	3	4
2014–15	Lake Erie Monsters	AHL	7	0	4	4	2	—	—	—	—	—
2015–16	San Antonio Rampage	AHL	37	6	13	19	6	—	—	—	—	—
2015–16	Colorado Avalanche	NHL	31	1	2	3	16	—	—	—	—	—
2016–17	San Antonio Rampage	AHL	45	5	14	19	37	—	—	—	—	—
2017–18	Colorado Avalanche	NHL	15	0	1	1	2	—	—	—	—	—
2017–18	San Antonio Rampage	AHL	20	1	5	6	14	—	—	—	—	—
2017–18	Hartford Wolf Pack	AHL	18	2	11	13	8	—	—	—	—	—
2018–19	Hartford Wolf Pack	AHL	52	3	19	22	36	—	—	—	—	—
2019–20	Lehigh Valley Phantoms	AHL	39	2	14	16	22	—	—	—	—	—
2020–21	Lehigh Valley Phantoms	AHL	21	2	6	8	8	—	—	—	—	—
2021–22	Wilkes-Barre/Scranton Penguins	AHL	28	3	7	10	12	—	—	—	—	—
2021–22	Chicago Wolves	AHL	12	2	1	3	6	—	—	—	—	—
2022–23	Barys Astana	KHL	23	0	1	1	8	—	—	—	—	—
2022–23	Iserlohn Roosters	DEL	28	1	6	7	14	—	—	—	—	—
NHL totals			46	1	3	4	18	—	—	—	—	—
KHL totals			23	0	1	1	8	—	—	—	—	—

=== International ===
Year	Team	Event	Result	GP	G	A	Pts	PIM
2012	Canada Ontario	U17	3rd place, bronze medalist(s)	6	1	1	2	2
2012	Canada	IH18	1st place, gold medalist(s)	5	0	0	0	2
2013	Canada	U18	1st place, gold medalist(s)	7	0	3	3	0
2014	Canada	WJC	4th	7	0	0	0	0
Junior totals				25	1	4	5	4

== Awards and honours ==
Award	Year
OHL
First All-Star Team	2015
AHL
Calder Cup (Chicago Wolves)	2022
International
Ivan Hlinka Memorial Tournament Gold Medal	2012
IIHF World U18 Championship Gold Medal	2013
