= Patrik Zdráhal =

Czech ice hockey player

- Zdráhal in 2026
- Born: 9 April 1995 (age 31) Ostrava, Czech Republic
- Height: 183 cm (6 ft 0 in)
- Weight: 83 kg (183 lb; 13 st 1 lb)
- Position: Forward
- Shoots: Left
- Czech team: HC Vítkovice Ridera
- NHL draft: Undrafted
- Playing career: 2014–present

Patrik Zdráhal (born 9 April 1995) is a Czech ice hockey forward currently playing for HC Vítkovice Ridera of the Czech Extraliga.

== Playing career ==
In 2012, Zdráhal was the first draft pick by the Acadie–Bathurst Titan in the 2012 Canadian Hockey League (CHL) Import Draft.

On 4 November 2013, Zdráhal was traded to Rimouski Océanic in exchange for Scott Ok, Charles-Anthony Poulin, and a 2014 fourth-round draft pick. While playing with Océanic, Zdráhal was one of eight CHL players selected to represent team Czech Republic at the 2014 World Junior Ice Hockey Championships in Sweden.

On 30 April 2014, Zdráhal returned to Europe with the HC Vítkovice Ridera. He signed an extension with the team on 4 May 2017, and again on 30 December 2018.
