= Dávid Šoltés =

Slovak ice hockey right winger

- Born: 5 February 1995 (age 30); Košice, Slovakia
- Height: 5 ft 11 in (180 cm)
- Weight: 190 lb (86 kg; 13 st 8 lb)
- Position: Right wing
- Shoots: Right
- Slovak team Former teams: HC 19 Humenné; HC Košice; HK Orange 20; HK Dukla Michalovce; HC '05 Banská Bystrica
- Playing career: 2015–present

Dávid Šoltés (born 5 February 1995) is a Slovak professional ice hockey right winger player who currently playing for HC MONACObet Banská Bystrica of the Slovak Extraliga.

Šoltés played junior hockey in the Western Hockey League for the Prince George Cougars, who drafted him 4th overall in the 2013 CHL Import Draft. He played two seasons for the Cougars between 2013 and 2015 before returning to his native Slovakia with his hometown team HC Košice. On January 25, 2019, Šoltés was traded to HC '05 Banská Bystrica for Ján Sýkora.

== Career statistics ==
=== Regular season and playoffs ===
			Regular season					Playoffs
Season	Team	League	GP	G	A	Pts	PIM	GP	G	A	Pts	PIM
2011–12	HC Košice	Slovak-Jr.	30	11	8	19	16	11	5	5	10	0
2011–12	HK Orange 20	Slovak.1	10	3	1	4	6	—	—	—	—	—
2012–13	HC Košice	Slovak-Jr.	19	13	3	16	60	11	4	4	8	40
2012–13	HK Orange 20	Slovak	4	0	0	0	0	—	—	—	—	—
2012–13	HK Orange 20	Slovak.1	8	1	0	1	6	—	—	—	—	—
2013–14	Prince George Cougars	WHL	15	4	1	5	10	—	—	—	—	—
2014–15	Prince George Cougars	WHL	44	13	15	28	32	5	0	2	2	0
2015–16	HC Košice	Slovak-Jr.	5	4	4	8	2	—	—	—	—	—
2015–16	HC Košice	Slovak	34	9	4	13	10	6	0	0	0	0
2015–16	HK Dukla Michalovce	Slovak.1	0	0	0	0	0	2	0	0	0	0
2016–17	HC Košice	Slovak	48	7	7	14	8	6	2	0	2	6
2017–18	HC Košice	Slovak	52	14	5	19	8	5	0	0	0	12
2018–19	HC Košice	Slovak	31	7	8	15	10	—	—	—	—	—
2018–19	HC '05 Banská Bystrica	Slovak	10	3	4	7	2	12	2	3	5	2
2019–20	HC '05 Banská Bystrica	Slovak	26	8	7	15	10	—	—	—	—	—
2020–21	HK Dukla Michalovce	Slovak	37	6	16	22	18	7	1	0	1	4
Slovak totals			242	54	51	105	66	36	5	3	8	24

Medal record

Representing Slovakia

Ice hockey

IIHF World U20 Championship
Bronze medal – third place	2015 Canada	

=== International ===
Year	Team	Event	Result	GP	G	A	Pts	PIM
2012	Slovakia	WJC18-D1	11th	5	1	2	3	2
2013	Slovakia	WJC18	9th	6	4	1	5	4
2015	Slovakia	WJC	3rd place, bronze medalist(s)	7	2	1	3	6
Junior totals				18	7	4	11	12
