= Yayla Arena =

Arena in Krefeld, Germany

Coordinates: 51°20′27″N 6°32′26″E

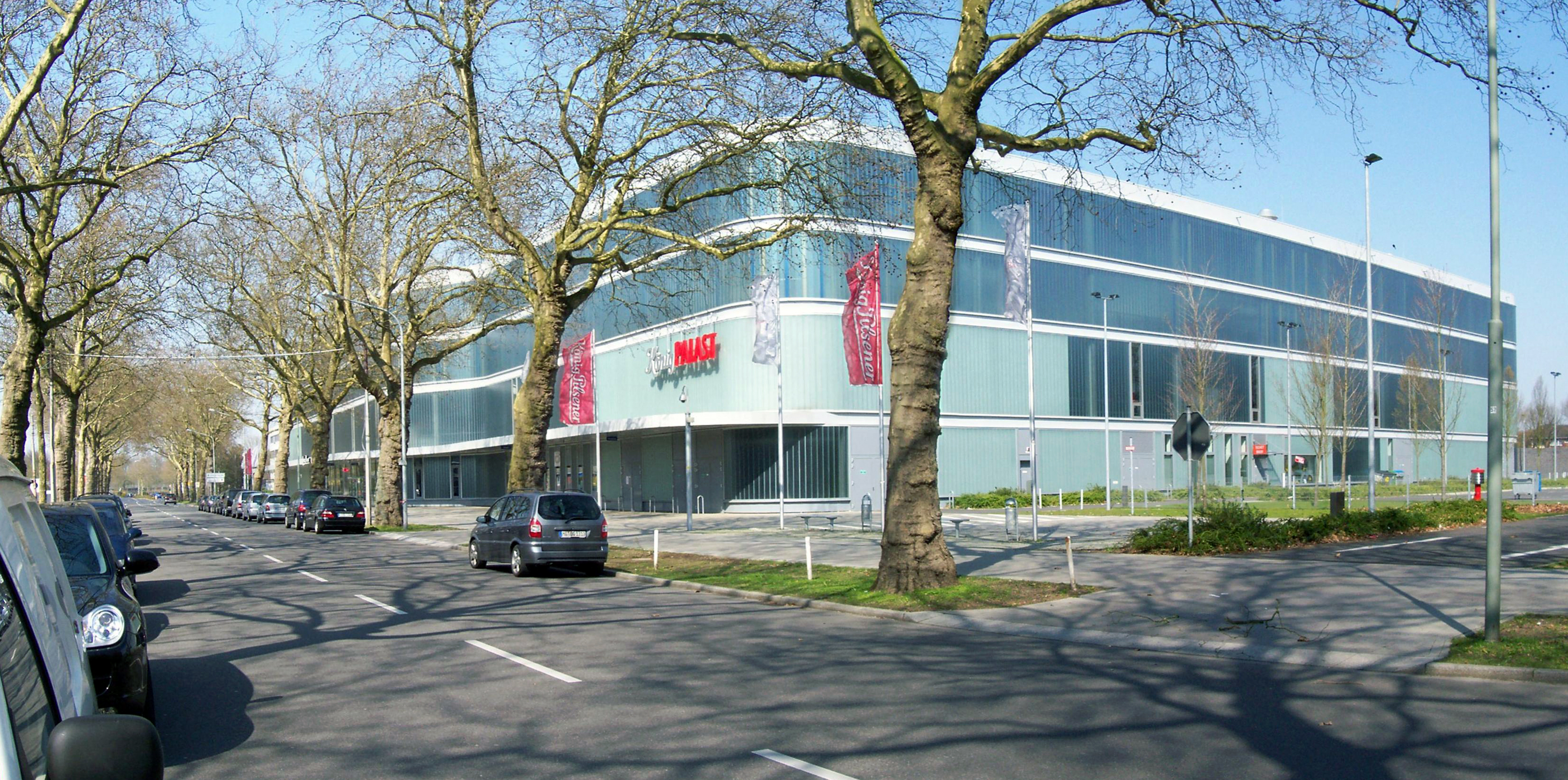
KönigPalast in 2007

Yayla Arena, formerly known as KönigPALAST from 2004 to 2018, is an arena in Krefeld, Germany. It is primarily used for ice hockey, and is the Home to the Krefeld Pinguine. It opened in 2004 and holds 8,029 people. The original name sponsor was the König Brewery from Duisburg.
