= Roman Přikryl =

Czech ice hockey player

- Born: February 11, 1995 (age 30); Plzeň, Czech Republic
- Height: 6 ft 0 in (183 cm)
- Weight: 178 lb (81 kg; 12 st 10 lb)
- Position: Forward
- Shoots: Left
- Czech team: HC Stadion Litoměřice
- Playing career: 2014–present

Roman Přikryl (born February 11, 1995) is a Czech professional ice hockey player. He is currently playing for HC Stadion Litoměřice of the Chance liga.

Přikryl made his Czech Extraliga debut playing with HC Plzeň during the 2014-15 Czech Extraliga season.
