= Matias Pulli =

Finnish ice hockey player

- Born: March 8, 1995 (age 30); Raisio, Finland
- Height: 5 ft 9 in (175 cm)
- Weight: 168 lb (76 kg; 12 st 0 lb)
- Position: Defence
- Shoots: Right
- Liiga team: HC TPS
- NHL draft: Undrafted
- Playing career: 2013–present

Matias Pulli (born March 8, 1995) is a Finnish ice hockey defenceman.

Pulli made his Liiga debut playing with HC TPS during the 2013–14 Liiga season.
