= Ebbe Siönäs =

Swedish ice hockey player

- Born: March 7, 1995 (age 31) Färingsö, Sweden
- Height: 5 ft 11 in (180 cm)
- Weight: 187 lb (85 kg; 13 st 5 lb)
- Position: Goaltender
- Catches: Left
- SuperElit team: AIK IF
- Playing career: 2011–present

Ebbe Siönäs
Medal record

Ice hockey

Representing Sweden

World U18 Championships
Silver medal – second place	2012 Czech Republic	Sweden

Ebbe Siönäs (born March 7, 1995) is a Swedish professional ice hockey goaltender who is currently playing with AIK IF in the Swedish SuperElit. Siönäs was placed by the NHL Central Scouting Bureau as the 2nd ranked European goaltender eligible for the 2013 NHL entry draft, however, he was not selected.

== Awards and honours ==
Awards	Year
J18 Allsvenskan Best Goaltender	2011-12
IIHF World U18 Championship Silver Medal with Team Sweden	2012
