= Rushan Rafikov =

Russian ice hockey player

- Born: 15 May 1995 (age 31) Saratov, Russia
- Height: 6 ft 2 in (188 cm)
- Weight: 207 lb (94 kg; 14 st 11 lb)
- Position: Defense
- Shoots: Left
- KHL team Former teams: Lokomotiv Yaroslavl; Admiral Vladivostok
- National team: Russia
- NHL draft: 187th overall, 2013; Calgary Flames
- Playing career: 2015–present

Rushan Rafikov (born 15 May 1995) is a Russian ice hockey player of Tatar descent. He is currently playing with Lokomotiv Yaroslavl of the Kontinental Hockey League. Rafikov was selected by the Calgary Flames in the seventh round (187th overall) of the 2013 NHL entry draft.

Rafikov made his Kontinental Hockey League debut during the 2015–16 KHL season.

== Career statistics ==
=== Regular season and playoffs ===
			Regular season					Playoffs
Season	Team	League	GP	G	A	Pts	PIM	GP	G	A	Pts	PIM
2011–12	Loko Yaroslavl	MHL	26	4	2	6	14	3	0	1	1	25
2012–13	Loko Yaroslavl	MHL	53	1	9	10	38	—	—	—	—	—
2013–14	Loko Yaroslavl	MHL	47	8	12	20	46	7	0	0	0	2
2014–15	HC Ryazan	VHL	35	1	17	18	16	5	1	2	3	0
2014–15	Loko Yaroslavl	MHL	2	1	0	1	0	14	4	4	8	22
2015–16	Lokomotiv Yaroslavl	KHL	16	0	0	0	6	—	—	—	—	—
2015–16	HC Ryazan	VHL	4	0	1	1	0	—	—	—	—	—
2015–16	Admiral Vladivostok	KHL	17	0	2	2	6	—	—	—	—	—
2015–16	Loko Yaroslavl	MHL	3	0	0	0	2	15	3	7	10	35
2016–17	Lokomotiv Yaroslavl	KHL	57	1	11	12	32	14	0	4	4	6
2017–18	Lokomotiv Yaroslavl	KHL	36	1	10	11	22	—	—	—	—	—
2018–19	Lokomotiv Yaroslavl	KHL	48	5	9	14	16	11	2	2	4	6
2019–20	Lokomotiv Yaroslavl	KHL	52	8	12	20	12	6	0	1	1	2
2020–21	Lokomotiv Yaroslavl	KHL	58	5	19	24	20	11	0	3	3	0
2021–22	Lokomotiv Yaroslavl	KHL	47	7	9	16	8	4	0	1	1	0
2022–23	Lokomotiv Yaroslavl	KHL	66	6	16	22	16	12	3	4	7	2
2023–24	Lokomotiv Yaroslavl	KHL	62	12	13	25	28	20	0	8	8	2
2024–25	Lokomotiv Yaroslavl	KHL	64	6	16	22	22	21	2	3	5	8
2025–26	Lokomotiv Yaroslavl	KHL	66	6	14	20	18	22	3	7	10	20
KHL totals			589	57	131	188	206	121	10	33	43	46

Medal record

Representing Russia

Ice hockey

World Junior Championships
Silver medal – second place	2015 Canada	

=== International ===
Year	Team	Event	Result	GP	G	A	Pts	PIM
2012	Russia	U17	1st place, gold medalist(s)	5	0	2	2	8
2012	Russia	IH18	5th	4	0	0	0	2
2013	Russia	U18	4th	7	0	5	5	10
2015	Russia	WJC	2nd place, silver medalist(s)	7	1	2	3	10
2021	ROC	WC	5th	5	0	0	0	2
Junior totals				23	1	9	10	30
Senior totals				5	0	0	0	2

== Awards and honors ==
Award	Year
KHL
Gagarin Cup champion	2025, 2026
