= Luboš Rob (ice hockey, born 1995) =

Czech ice hockey player

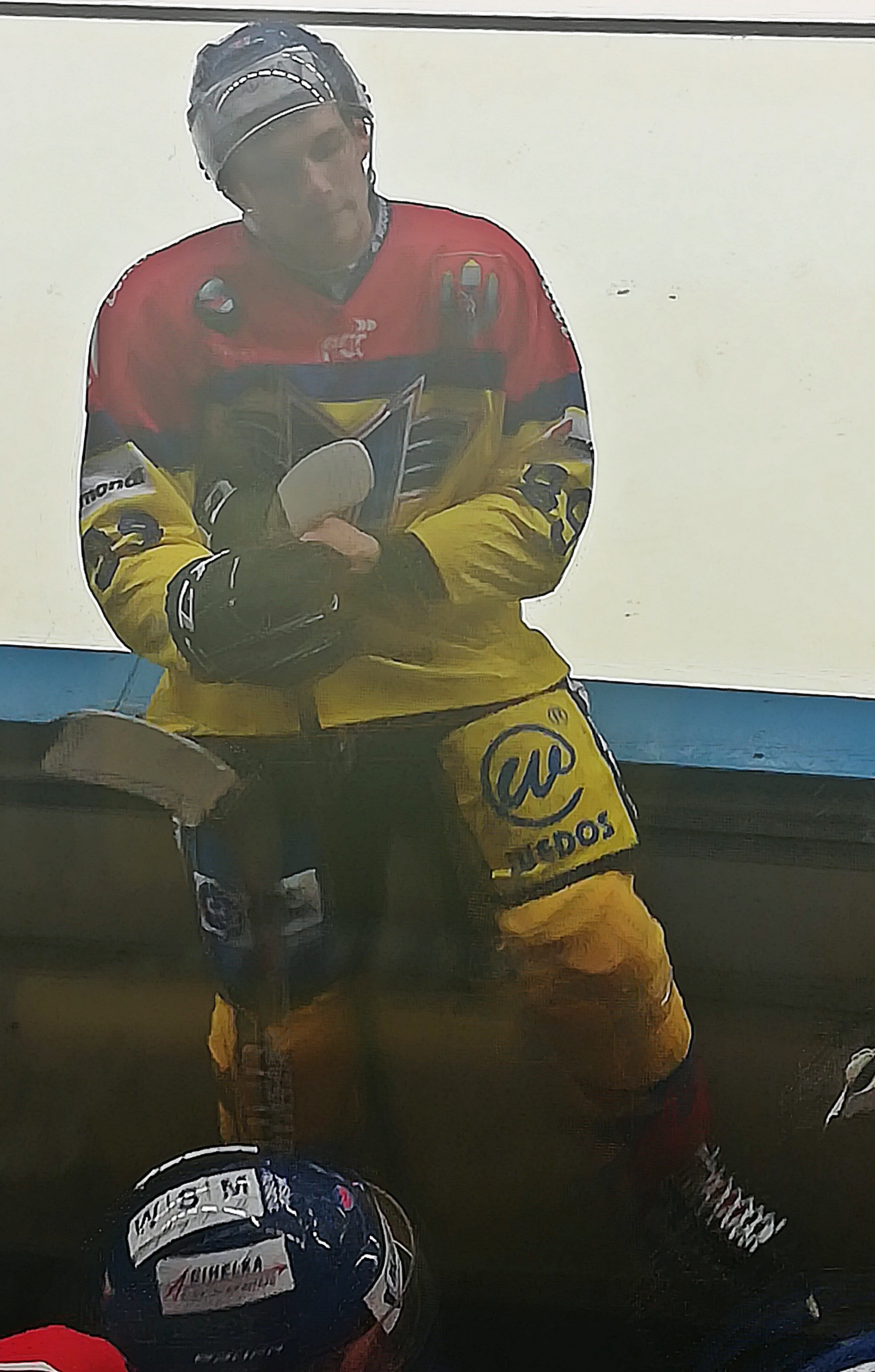
- Born: April 18, 1995 (age 29); České Budějovice, Czech Republic
- Height: 6 ft 0 in (183 cm)
- Weight: 183 lb (83 kg; 13 st 1 lb)
- Position: Forward
- Shoots: Left
- Czech Extraliga team: VHK Vsetín
- Playing career: 2013–present

Luboš Rob (born April 18, 1995) is a Czech ice hockey player. His father Luboš Rob senior (born 1970) is also a Czech professional ice hockey player and was drafted by the New York Rangers in the fifth round of the 1990 NHL Draft.

He is currently playing with VHK Vsetín of the Czech Chance ligy.

Rob made his Czech Extraliga debut playing with HC České Budějovice during the 2012–13 Czech Extraliga season.
