= Jonatan Tanus =

Finnish ice hockey player

- Born: 4 June 1995 (age 29); Kuopio, Finland
- Height: 5 ft 9 in (175 cm)
- Weight: 181 lb (82 kg; 12 st 13 lb)
- Position: Left wing
- Shoots: Left
- Liiga team Former teams: SaiPa; Lempäälän Kisa; Tappara; SaPKo
- NHL draft: Undrafted
- Playing career: 2012–present

Jonatan Tanus (born 4 June 1995) is a Finnish professional ice hockey player. He is currently playing for SaiPa of the Finnish Liiga. Jonatan's father Michael Tanus has served as Tappara team doctor since 2007, through his father he also holds dual Israeli citizenship. His mother Sari was elected in the Parliament of Finland in 2015 representing the Christian Democrats.

Tanus made his Liiga debut playing with Tappara during the 2015–16 Liiga season.
