= Vladimir Tkachev (ice hockey, born 1995) =

Russian ice hockey player (born 1995)

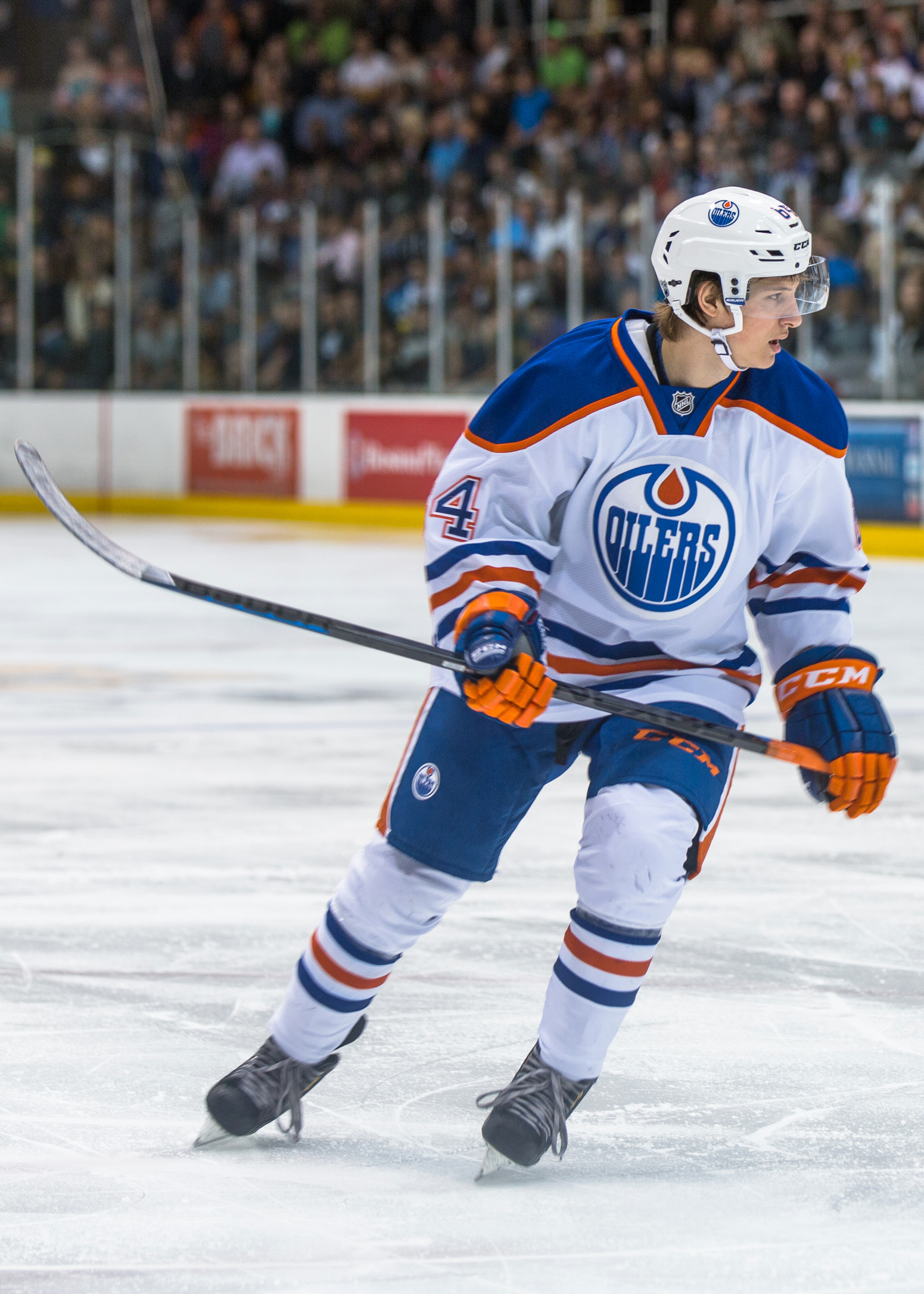
- Tkachev with the Edmonton Oilers in 2014
- Born: October 5, 1995 (age 31) Omsk, Russia
- Height: 5 ft 10 in (178 cm)
- Weight: 165 lb (75 kg; 11 st 11 lb)
- Position: Left wing
- Shoots: Right
- KHL team Former teams: Metallurg Magnitogorsk; Avangard Omsk; SKA Saint Petersburg; Admiral Vladivostok; Salavat Yulaev Ufa; Los Angeles Kings
- NHL draft: Undrafted
- Playing career: 2013–present

Vladimir Eduardovich Tkachev (Russian: Влади́мир Эдуардович Ткачёв; born October 5, 1995) is a Russian professional ice hockey left winger who currently plays for Metallurg Magnitogorsk of the Kontinental Hockey League (KHL).

== Playing career ==
Tkachev was drafted by Avangard Omsk in the third round, 73rd overall, in the 2012 KHL Draft. He then began his career playing for the club's MHL affiliate, Omskie Yastreby. The following year, at the age of 17, he was selected by the Moncton Wildcats of the Quebec Major Junior Hockey League in the first round, 39th overall, in the 2013 CHL Import Draft. He soon after made his professional hockey debut with Avangard Omsk during the 2013–14 KHL season, playing two games with the club before being returned to Omskie Yastreby. Partway through the 2013-14 season, an IIHF transfer agreement was made between the CHL and the KHL for Tkachev to play with the Moncton Wildcats. Roger Shannon, the Director of Hockey Operations for the Wildcats, stated that it was to be "an exciting day to see this young superstar in a Wildcats jersey."

=== Junior hockey ===
==== 2013–14 season ====
Tkachev debuted with the QMJHL's Moncton Wildcats on January 23, 2014. He scored four points that night and was named the game's first star in a 7-4 victory against the Chicoutimi Saguenéens. Wildcats coach Darren Rumble identified him as an "elite player" after his debut. He finished the 2013-14 QMJHL season with 10 goals and 20 assists for 30 points in 20 games. In his first QMJHL playoff campaign he scored 7 goals and 2 assists in 6 games.

==== Edmonton Oilers contract annulment ====
As an 18-year-old player, Tkachev was eligible for the 2014 NHL entry draft but went undrafted despite being listed 60th overall on the NHL Central Scouting Services' final 2014 North American skaters list. He was, however, invited to the Edmonton Oilers' training camp later that year. His performance in their training camp impressed the Oilers, and he was quickly signed to a three-year entry-level contract with the team. Oiler fans immediately anointed him "Vladdy Hockey" as a direct comparison to "Johnny Hockey" Gaudreau, a star player who plays for rival Calgary. The National Hockey League, however, rejected the contract, informing the Oilers that Tkachev was ineligible to be signed by any NHL team until the 2015 off-season because the Collective Bargaining Agreement stated that CHL players needed to play a full season in North America to be eligible if undrafted. The Oilers admitted not realizing that this clause existed, and Tkachev remained unsigned. He promptly returned to the Moncton Wildcats to continue his QMJHL career.

==== 2014–15 season ====
The 2014-15 season began with great success for Tkachev as he scored nine points in his first five games, more points in that timeframe than anyone who was drafted in the 2014 NHL Entry Draft. After 13 games in the 2014-15 season he had accumulated 16 points, but on November 4, 2014, he suffered an injury and subsequently missed a month of action. Upon his return, Tkachev was traded to the Quebec Remparts for Taylor Burke in addition to a 7th and 8th round pick in the 2015 QMJHL Entry Draft. The decision was made on the basis that the Wildcats needed to readjust their roster for the future and to allow Tkachev an opportunity to play in the 2015 Memorial Cup, as the Quebec Remparts were slated to host the event. The Wildcats' Roger Shannon expressed his gratitude to Tkachev for "adding a spark" to the organization and thanked him for his time as a member of the team. In January 2015, the NHL's Central Scouting Services ranked him 121st overall with questions looming regarding his height and small 163-lb frame.

With the Quebec Remparts, Tkachev scored 12 goals and 21 assists in 33 games to help the team qualify for the 2015 QMJHL playoffs. During the playoffs, Tkachev scored six goals and 10 assists for 16 points in 21 games. The Remparts reached the QMJHL Final against the Rimouski Oceanic but were ultimately defeated in the seventh game of the seven-game series. As the host team for the 2015 Memorial Cup, the Remparts automatically qualified for that event. In the Memorial Cup, the Remparts were defeated in the semi-final against the Kelowna Rockets.

The NHL Central Scouting Services ranked Tkachev 159th overall in its final April 2015 rankings.

=== Professional ===
Tkachev opted to return to his native Russia to resume his professional career after his KHL right's were traded by Avangard to SKA Saint Petersburg on September 12, 2015. He later agreed to a two-year playing contract with SKA ten days later on September 22.

At the conclusion of his second productive season with Salavat Yulaev Ufa in 2018–19, Tkachev while in need of a new contract could not agree to terms with Ufa. On June 3, 2019, his rights were traded from Salavat back to SKA Saint Petersburg in exchange for the rights to Nikita Soshnikov. He was later signed to a two-year contract through 2021 with SKA on July 10, 2019.

On May 29, 2021, Tkachev as a free agent left SKA, and signed a one-year, entry-level contract with the Los Angeles Kings of the NHL. In his first professional North American season, Tkachev made the Kings opening night roster for the 2021–22 season out of training camp. He made his long awaited NHL debut registering 2 assists in a season opening 6-2 victory over the Vegas Golden Knights on 14 October 2021. Tkachev made 3 further appearances with the Kings before he was re-assigned to AHL affiliate, the Ontario Reign, for the remainder of the season, collecting 7 goals and 29 points through 41 games.

With limited opportunity with the Kings, in the off-season Tkachev's KHL rights were traded from SKA Saint Petersburg back to original club, Avangard Omsk, in exchange for financial compensation. He was signed to a two-year contract to rejoin Avangard Omsk on 20 June 2022.

In the 2022/23 season, he played 78 matches with Avangard, scored 26 goals and provided 47 assists, becoming the bronze medalist of the KHL championship. In August 2023, he was named the highest-paid KHL player according to Match TV. In the 2023/24 season, he played 70 matches and scored 86 points, becoming the club's second scorer. On May 29, 2024, he signed a five-year contract with Avangard.

At the end of July 2024, he tore his Achilles tendon during a running warm-up during individual preparation for the season. The expected recovery period is about six months. On February 21, 2025, he returned to the ice and held his first training session with the team.

After the conclusion of his third season with Avangard, Tkachev was mutually released from his contract on 18 July 2025. As a free agent he was signed to a two-year contract with Metallurg Magnitogorsk on 28 July 2025.

== Career statistics ==
=== Regular season and playoffs ===
			Regular season					Playoffs
Season	Team	League	GP	G	A	Pts	PIM	GP	G	A	Pts	PIM
2012–13	Omskie Yastreby	MHL	47	13	22	35	20	4	0	2	2	2
2013–14	Omskie Yastreby	MHL	16	7	12	19	12	—	—	—	—	—
2013–14	Avangard Omsk	KHL	2	0	0	0	0	—	—	—	—	—
2013–14	Moncton Wildcats	QMJHL	20	10	20	30	16	6	7	2	9	12
2014–15	Moncton Wildcats	QMJHL	13	4	12	16	8	—	—	—	—	—
2014–15	Quebec Remparts	QMJHL	33	12	21	33	18	21	6	10	16	11
2015–16	SKA-1946 St. Petersburg	MHL	6	3	3	6	6	—	—	—	—	—
2015–16	SKA Saint Petersburg	KHL	2	0	0	0	0	—	—	—	—	—
2015–16	SKA-Neva St. Petersburg	VHL	17	5	4	9	48	5	1	0	1	6
2016–17	Admiral Vladivostok	KHL	49	14	25	39	18	5	1	2	3	2
2017–18	Admiral Vladivostok	KHL	36	14	16	30	28	—	—	—	—	—
2017–18	Salavat Yulaev Ufa	KHL	12	4	6	10	14	14	1	2	3	10
2018–19	Salavat Yulaev Ufa	KHL	53	5	21	26	28	17	4	6	10	10
2019–20	SKA Saint Petersburg	KHL	55	14	28	42	25	4	1	5	6	2
2020–21	SKA Saint Petersburg	KHL	45	11	27	38	26	11	1	7	8	2
2021–22	Los Angeles Kings	NHL	4	0	2	2	2	—	—	—	—	—
2021–22	Ontario Reign	AHL	41	7	22	29	26	5	2	4	6	4
2022–23	Avangard Omsk	KHL	64	23	36	59	31	14	3	11	14	4
2023–24	Avangard Omsk	KHL	58	20	55	75	32	12	0	11	11	10
2024–25	Avangard Omsk	KHL	4	1	4	5	2	13	3	7	10	8
2025–26	Metallurg Magnitogorsk	KHL	66	13	58	71	48	15	2	8	10	0
KHL totals			446	119	276	395	252	105	16	59	75	48
NHL totals			4	0	2	2	2	—	—	—	—	—

=== International ===
Year	Team	Event	Result	GP	G	A	Pts	PIM
2013	Russia	U18	4th	7	5	6	11	2
Junior totals				7	5	6	11	2
