= Jan Štencel =

Czech ice hockey player

- Born: February 26, 1995 (age 31) Opava, Czech Republic
- Height: 5 ft 9 in (175 cm)
- Weight: 185 lb (84 kg; 13 st 3 lb)
- Position: Defence
- Shoots: Left
- ELH team Former teams: Motor České Budějovice; HC Vítkovice; HC Kometa Brno
- Playing career: 2012–present

Jan Štencel (born February 26, 1995) is a Czech ice hockey defenceman currently playing with Motor České Budějovice in the Czech Extraliga (ELH). He made his Extraliga debut playing with HC Vítkovice during the 2012–13 Czech Extraliga season.
