= Nikolai Demidov (ice hockey) =

Russian ice hockey player

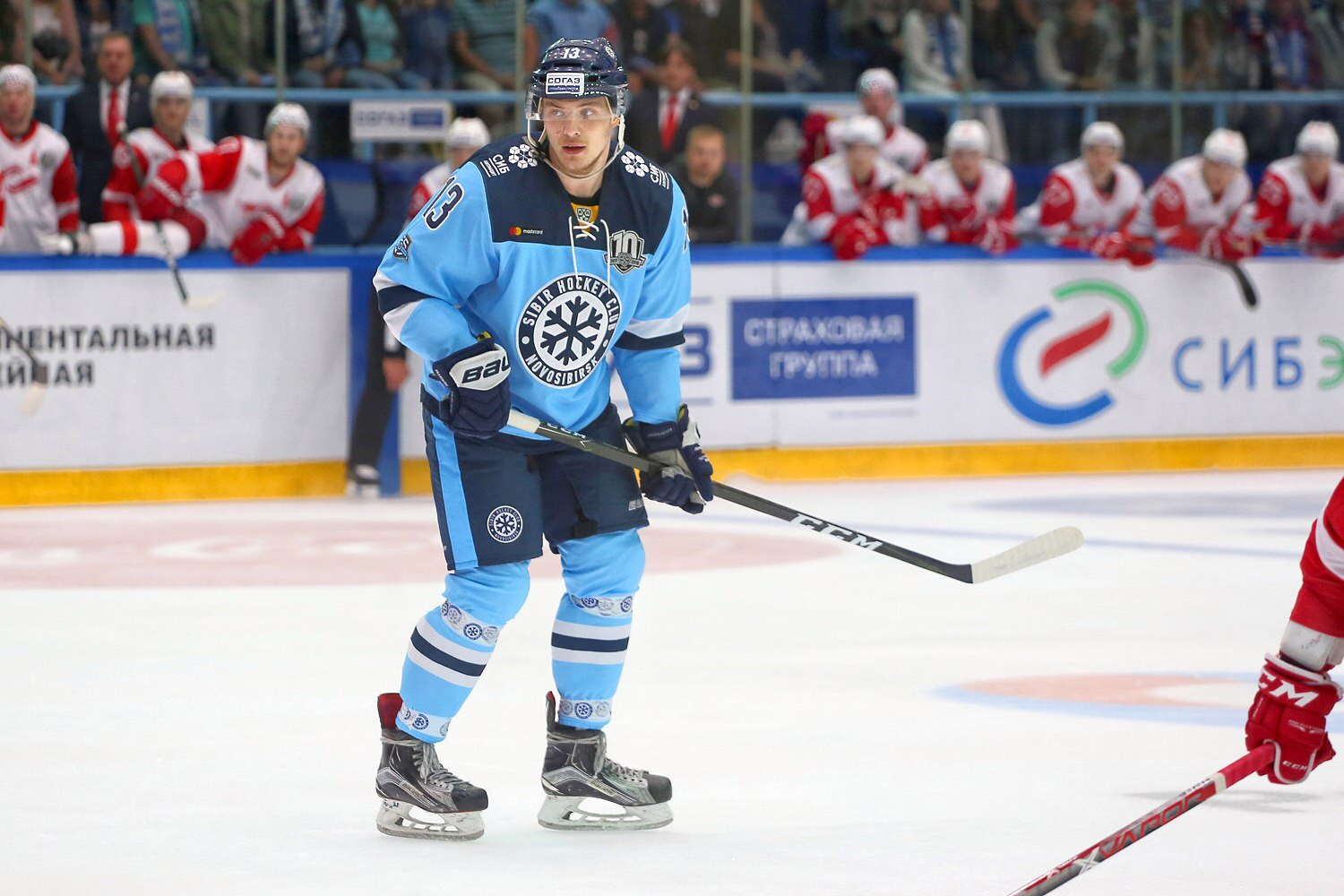
- Demidov with HC Sibir Novosibirsk in 2017
- Born: 16 November 1995 (age 29); Golitsyno, Russia
- Height: 6 ft 0 in (183 cm)
- Weight: 187 lb (85 kg; 13 st 5 lb)
- Position: Defence
- Shoots: Left
- KHL team Former teams: Free agent Sibir Novosibirsk; Torpedo Nizhny Novgorod; Severstal Cherepovets; Lada Togliatti
- Playing career: 2016–present

Nikolai Nikolaevich Demidov (Russian: Николай Николаевич Демидов; born 16 November 1995) is a Russian professional ice hockey defenceman who is currently an unrestricted free agent. He most recently played for HC Lada Togliatti in the Kontinental Hockey League (KHL).

On 20 March 2018 Demidov was signed to a two-year contract extension to remain with HC Sibir Novosibirsk through to 2020.
