= Dmitry Yudin =

Russian ice hockey player

- Born: July 31, 1995 (age 31) Nizhny Tagil, Russia
- Height: 6 ft 2 in (188 cm)
- Weight: 185 lb (84 kg; 13 st 3 lb)
- Position: Defence
- Shoots: Left
- KHL team Former teams: Avtomobilist Yekaterinburg; SKA Saint Petersburg; Spartak Moscow; Ak Bars Kazan
- Playing career: 2013–present

Dmitry Yudin (born July 31, 1995) is a Russian professional ice hockey defenceman. He is currently under contract with Avtomobilist Yekaterinburg of the Kontinental Hockey League (KHL).

== Playing career ==
Yudin made his Kontinental Hockey League debut playing with SKA Saint Petersburg during the 2013–14 KHL season. On June 30, 2017, Yudin was traded by SKA to HC Spartak Moscow in exchange for financial compensation prior to the 2017–18 season.

At the beginning of the 2018–19 season, before making his season debut, Yudin was traded by Spartak to reigning champions, Ak Bars Kazan, in exchange for Yaroslav Kosov on September 3, 2018.

In his seventh season with Ak Bars, Yudin was traded during the 2024–25 campaign in a return to his original club, SKA Saint Petersburg, in exchange for Stepan Falkovsky on 27 December 2024.

After completing just one further season with SKA and approaching his final season under contract, Yudin was traded alongside Sergei Andronov to Salavat Yulaev Ufa in exchange for a prospect and financial compensation on 25 July 2025. He was later released from the remaining year of his contract with Salavat on 1 August 2025.

== Awards and honors ==
Award	Year
KHL
Gagarin Cup (SKA Saint Petersburg)	2015
