= 2013 NHL entry draft =

2013 North American ice hockey draft

General information
- Date: June 30, 2013
- Location: Prudential Center; Newark, New Jersey, U.S.

Overview
- 211 total selections in 7 rounds
- First selection: (Canada) Nathan MacKinnon (Colorado Avalanche)

The 2013 NHL entry draft was the 51st draft for the National Hockey League. It was held on June 30, 2013, at the Prudential Center in Newark, New Jersey. The top three selections were Nathan MacKinnon by the Colorado Avalanche, Aleksander Barkov by the Florida Panthers, and Jonathan Drouin by the Tampa Bay Lightning.

As of 2026, there are 50 active NHL players from this draft.

== Eligibility ==
Ice hockey players born between January 1, 1993, and September 15, 1995, were eligible for selection in the 2013 NHL entry draft. Additionally, un-drafted, non-North American players born in 1992 were eligible for the draft; and those players who were drafted in the 2011 NHL entry draft, but not signed by an NHL team and who were born after June 30, 1993, were also eligible to re-enter the draft.

== Draft lottery ==
Beginning with the 2013 NHL entry draft, all 14 teams not qualifying for the Stanley Cup playoffs had a "weighted" chance at winning the first overall selection. The Colorado Avalanche won the 2013 draft lottery that took place on April 29, 2013, thus moving them up from the second pick to the first pick.

== Top prospects ==
Source: NHL Central Scouting final (April 24, 2013) ranking.

Ranking	North American skaters	European skaters
1	(United States) Seth Jones (D)	(Finland) Aleksander Barkov (C)
2	(Canada) Nathan MacKinnon (C)	(Russia) Valeri Nichushkin (RW)
3	(Canada) Jonathan Drouin (LW)	(Sweden) Elias Lindholm (C)
4	(Canada) Darnell Nurse (D)	(Finland) Rasmus Ristolainen (D)
5	(Canada) Sean Monahan (C)	(Sweden) Alexander Wennberg (C)
6	(Canada) Hunter Shinkaruk (C/LW)	(Sweden) Andre Burakovsky (LW)
7	(Russia) Valentin Zykov (LW)	(Sweden) Jacob de la Rose (LW)
8	(Canada) Frederik Gauthier (C)	(Sweden) Robert Hagg (D)
9	(Switzerland) Mirco Mueller (D)	(Finland) Artturi Lehkonen (LW)
10	(Canada) Anthony Mantha (RW)	(Russia) Pavel Buchnevich (LW)

Ranking	North American goalies	European goalies
1	(Canada) Zachary Fucale	(Finland) Juuse Saros
2	(Canada) Eric Comrie	(Sweden) Ebbe Sionas
3	(Canada) Tristan Jarry	(Slovenia) Luka Gracnar

== Selections by round ==
The order of the 2013 entry draft is listed below.

= NHL All-Star team ·	= NHL All-Star (Note: Players are identified as an All-Star if they were selected for the All-Star game at any time in their career.) ·	= NHL All-Star and NHL All-Star team ·

=== Round one ===
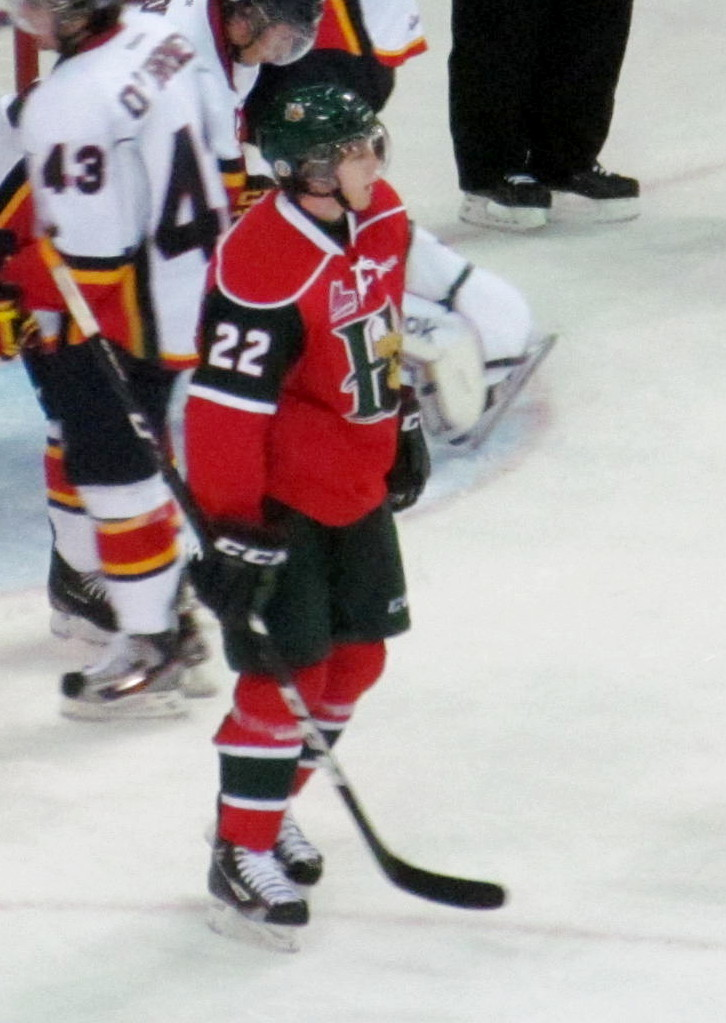
Nathan MacKinnon was selected first overall by the Colorado Avalanche.

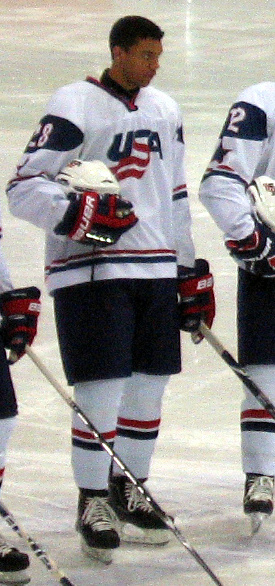
Seth Jones was selected fourth overall by the Nashville Predators.

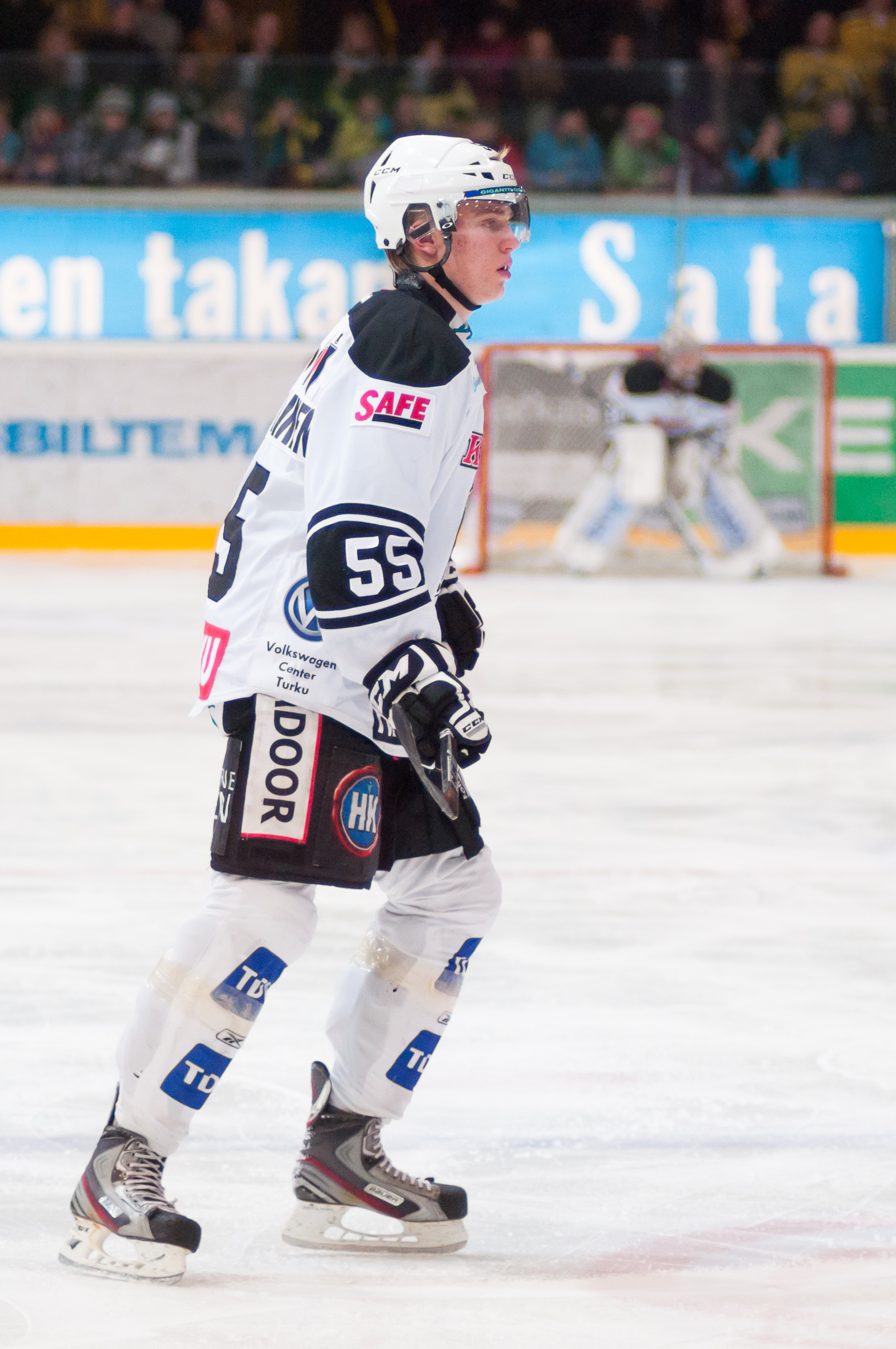
Rasmus Ristolainen was selected eighth overall by the Buffalo Sabres.

#	Player	Nationality	NHL team	College/junior/club team
1	Nathan MacKinnon (C)	Canada	Colorado Avalanche	Halifax Mooseheads (QMJHL)
2	Aleksander Barkov Jr. (C)	Finland	Florida Panthers	Tappara (SM-liiga)
3	Jonathan Drouin (LW)	Canada	Tampa Bay Lightning	Halifax Mooseheads (QMJHL)
4	Seth Jones (D)	United States	Nashville Predators	Portland Winterhawks (WHL)
5	Elias Lindholm (C)	Sweden	Carolina Hurricanes	Brynas IF (SHL)
6	Sean Monahan (C)	Canada	Calgary Flames	Ottawa 67's (OHL)
7	Darnell Nurse (D)	Canada	Edmonton Oilers	Sault Ste. Marie Greyhounds (OHL)
8	Rasmus Ristolainen (D)	Finland	Buffalo Sabres	TPS (SM-liiga)
9	Bo Horvat (C)	Canada	Vancouver Canucks (from New Jersey)^{1}	London Knights (OHL)
10	Valeri Nichushkin (RW)	Russia	Dallas Stars	Dynamo Moscow (KHL)
11	Samuel Morin (D)	Canada	Philadelphia Flyers	Rimouski Oceanic (QMJHL)
12	Max Domi (C)	Canada	Phoenix Coyotes	London Knights (OHL)
13	Josh Morrissey (D)	Canada	Winnipeg Jets	Prince Albert Raiders (WHL)
14	Alexander Wennberg (C)	Sweden	Columbus Blue Jackets	Djurgardens IF (Swe-2)
15	Ryan Pulock (D)	Canada	New York Islanders	Brandon Wheat Kings (WHL)
16	Nikita Zadorov (D)	Russia	Buffalo Sabres (from Minnesota)^{2}	London Knights (OHL)
17	Curtis Lazar (RW/C)	Canada	Ottawa Senators	Edmonton Oil Kings (WHL)
18	Mirco Mueller (D)	Switzerland	San Jose Sharks (from Detroit)^{3}	Everett Silvertips (WHL)
19	Kerby Rychel (LW)	Canada	Columbus Blue Jackets (from NY Rangers)^{4}	Windsor Spitfires (OHL)
20	Anthony Mantha (RW)	Canada	Detroit Red Wings (from San Jose)^{5}	Val-d'Or Foreurs (QMJHL)
21	Frederik Gauthier (C)	Canada	Toronto Maple Leafs	Rimouski Oceanic (QMJHL)
22	Emile Poirier (RW)	Canada	Calgary Flames (from St. Louis)^{6}	Gatineau Olympiques (QMJHL)
23	Andre Burakovsky (LW)	Sweden	Washington Capitals	Malmo Redhawks (Swe-2)
24	Hunter Shinkaruk (LW/RW)	Canada	Vancouver Canucks	Medicine Hat Tigers (WHL)
25	Michael McCarron (RW)	United States	Montreal Canadiens	USA NTDP (USHL)
26	Shea Theodore (D)	Canada	Anaheim Ducks	Seattle Thunderbirds (WHL)
27	Marko Dano (RW)	Slovakia	Columbus Blue Jackets (from Los Angeles)^{7}	Slovan Bratislava (KHL)
28	Morgan Klimchuk (LW)	Canada	Calgary Flames (from Pittsburgh)^{8}	Regina Pats (WHL)
29	Jason Dickinson (C)	Canada	Dallas Stars (from Boston)^{9}	Guelph Storm (OHL)
30	Ryan Hartman (RW)	United States	Chicago Blackhawks	Plymouth Whalers (OHL)

Notes

1. The New Jersey Devils' first-round pick went to the Vancouver Canucks as the result of a trade on June 30, 2013, that sent Cory Schneider to New Jersey in exchange for this pick.
2. The Minnesota Wild's first-round pick went to the Buffalo Sabres as the result of trade on April 3, 2013, that sent Jason Pominville and a fourth-round pick in 2014 to Minnesota in exchange for Matt Hackett, Johan Larsson, a second-round pick in 2014 and this pick.
3. The Detroit Red Wings' first-round pick went to the San Jose Sharks as the result of a trade on June 30, 2013, that sent a first-round pick in 2013 (20th overall) and Pittsburgh's second-round pick in 2013 (58th overall) to Detroit in exchange for this pick.
4. The New York Rangers' first-round pick went to the Columbus Blue Jackets as the result of a trade on July 23, 2012, that sent Rick Nash, Steven Delisle and a conditional third-round pick in 2013 to New York in exchange for Artem Anisimov, Brandon Dubinsky, Tim Erixon and this pick.
5. The San Jose Sharks' first-round pick went to the Detroit Red Wings as the result of a trade on June 30, 2013, that sent a first-round pick in 2013 (18th overall) to San Jose in exchange Pittsburgh's second-round pick in 2013 (58th overall) and this pick.
6. The St. Louis Blues' first-round pick went to the Calgary Flames as the result of a trade on April 1, 2013, that sent Jay Bouwmeester to St. Louis in exchange for Mark Cundari, Reto Berra, and this pick (being conditional at the time of the trade). The condition – Calgary will receive St. Louis' first-round pick in 2013 if St. Louis qualifies for the 2013 Stanley Cup playoffs – was converted on April 23, 2013.
7. The Los Angeles Kings' first-round pick went to the Columbus Blue Jackets as a result of a trade on February 23, 2012, that sent Jeff Carter to Los Angeles in exchange for Jack Johnson and this pick (being conditional at the time of the trade). One condition was converted on April 5, 2012, when Los Angeles qualified for the 2012 Stanley Cup playoffs, giving Columbus the right to choose between Los Angeles' first-round picks in either 2012 or 2013. The other condition was converted on June 22, 2012, when Columbus chose not to take Los Angeles' first round pick in 2012, giving them this pick.
8. The Pittsburgh Penguins' first-round pick went to the Calgary Flames as the result of a trade on March 27, 2013, that sent Jarome Iginla to Pittsburgh in exchange for Kenny Agostino, Ben Hanowski and this pick.
9. The Boston Bruins' first-round pick went to the Dallas Stars as the result of a trade on April 2, 2013, that sent Jaromir Jagr to Boston in exchange for Lane MacDermid, Cody Payne and this pick (being conditional at the time of the trade). The condition – Dallas will receive a first-round pick if Boston advances to the 2013 Eastern Conference Finals – was converted on May 25, 2013.

=== Round two ===
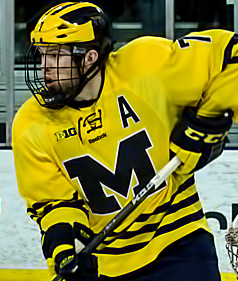
J. T. Compher was selected 35th overall by the Buffalo Sabres.

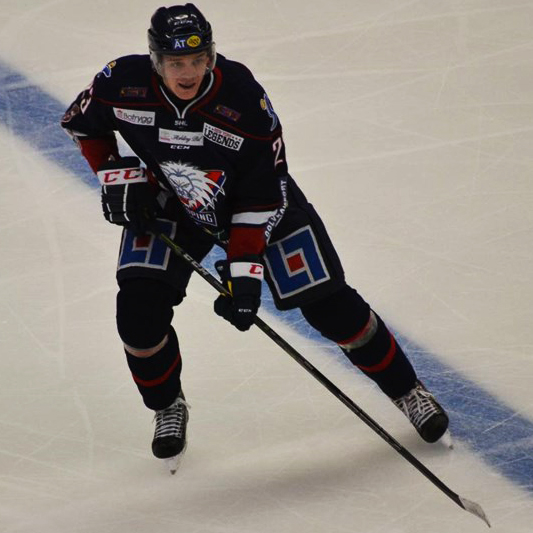
Carl Dahlstrom was selected 51st overall by the Chicago Blackhawks.

#	Player	Nationality	NHL team	College/junior/club team
31	Ian McCoshen (D)	United States	Florida Panthers	Waterloo Blackhawks (USHL)
32	Chris Bigras (D)	Canada	Colorado Avalanche	Owen Sound Attack (OHL)
33	Adam Erne (LW)	United States	Tampa Bay Lightning	Quebec Remparts (QMJHL)
34	Jacob de la Rose (LW)	Sweden	Montreal Canadiens (from Nashville)^{1}	Leksands IF (SHL)
35	J. T. Compher (LW)	United States	Buffalo Sabres (from Carolina)^{2}	Michigan Wolverines (Big 10)
36	Zachary Fucale (G)	Canada	Montreal Canadiens (from Calgary)^{3}	Halifax Mooseheads (QMJHL)
37	Valentin Zykov (LW)	Russia	Los Angeles Kings (from Edmonton)^{4}	Baie-Comeau Drakkar (QMJHL)
38	Connor Hurley (C)	United States	Buffalo Sabres	Edina Hornets (MSHSL)
39	Laurent Dauphin (C)	Canada	Phoenix Coyotes (from New Jersey)^{5}	Chicoutimi Sagueneens (QMJHL)
40	Remi Elie (LW)	Canada	Dallas Stars	London Knights (OHL)
41	Robert Hagg (D)	Sweden	Philadelphia Flyers	MODO (SHL)
42	Steven Santini (D)	United States	New Jersey Devils (from Phoenix)^{6}	Boston College Eagles (HEA)
43	Nic Petan (C)	Canada	Winnipeg Jets	Portland Winterhawks (WHL)
44	Tristan Jarry (G)	Canada	Pittsburgh Penguins (from Columbus)^{7}	Edmonton Oil Kings (WHL)
45	Nick Sorensen (RW)	Sweden	Anaheim Ducks (from NY Islanders)^{8}	Quebec Remparts (QMJHL)
46	Gustav Olofsson (D)	Sweden	Minnesota Wild	Green Bay Gamblers (USHL)
47	Tommy Vannelli (D)	United States	St. Louis Blues (from Ottawa)^{9}	Minnetonka Skippers (MSHSL)
48	Zach Nastasiuk (RW)	Canada	Detroit Red Wings	Owen Sound Attack (OHL)
49	Gabryel Paquin-Boudreau (LW)	Canada	San Jose Sharks (from NY Rangers)^{10}	Baie-Comeau Drakkar (QMJHL)
50	Dillon Heatherington (D)	Canada	Columbus Blue Jackets (from San Jose via Pittsburgh)^{11}	Swift Current Broncos (WHL)
51	Carl Dahlstrom (D)	Sweden	Chicago Blackhawks (from Toronto)^{12}	Linkopings HC J20 (SE)
52	Justin Bailey (RW)	United States	Buffalo Sabres (from St. Louis)^{13}	Kitchener Rangers (OHL)
53	Madison Bowey (D)	Canada	Washington Capitals	Kelowna Rockets (WHL)
54	Philippe Desrosiers (G)	Canada	Dallas Stars (from Vancouver)^{14}	Rimouski Oceanic (QMJHL)
55	Artturi Lehkonen (LW)	Finland	Montreal Canadiens	KalPa (SM-liiga)
56	Marc-Olivier Roy (C)	Canada	Edmonton Oilers (from Anaheim)^{15}	Blainville-Boisbriand Armada (QMJHL)
57	William Carrier (LW)	Canada	St. Louis Blues (from Los Angeles via Edmonton)^{16}	Cape Breton Screaming Eagles (QMJHL)
58	Tyler Bertuzzi (LW)	Canada	Detroit Red Wings (from Pittsburgh via San Jose)^{17}	Guelph Storm (OHL)
59	Eric Comrie (G)	Canada	Winnipeg Jets (compensatory)^{18}	Tri-City Americans (WHL)
60	Linus Arnesson (D)	Sweden	Boston Bruins	Djurgardens IF (Swe-2)
61	Zach Sanford (LW)	United States	Washington Capitals (from Chicago via Winnipeg)^{19}	Islanders Hockey Club (EJHL)

Notes

1. The Nashville Predators' second-round pick went to the Montreal Canadiens as the result of a trade on February 27, 2012, that sent Andrei Kostitsyn to Nashville in exchange for the cancellation of a previously arranged conditional fifth-round pick (in a 2012 trade of Hal Gill to Nashville from Montreal) in 2013 and this pick.
2. The Carolina Hurricanes' second-round pick went to the Buffalo Sabres as the result of a trade on June 30, 2013, that sent Andrej Sekera to Carolina in exchange for Jamie McBain and this pick.
3. The Calgary Flames' second-round pick went to the Montreal Canadiens as the result of a trade on January 12, 2012, that sent Michael Cammalleri, Karri Ramo and Montreal's fifth-round pick in 2012 to Calgary in exchange for Rene Bourque, Patrick Holland and this pick.
4. The Edmonton Oilers' second-round pick went to the Los Angeles Kings as the result of a trade on June 30, 2013, that sent a second and third-round pick in 2013 (57th and 88th overall) and Carolina's fourth-round pick in 2013 (96th overall) to Edmonton in exchange for this pick.
5. The New Jersey Devils' second-round pick went to the Phoenix Coyotes as the result of a trade on June 30, 2013, that sent second and third-round picks in 2013 (42nd and 73rd overall) to New Jersey in exchange for this pick.
6. The Phoenix Coyotes' second-round pick went to the New Jersey Devils as the result of a trade on June 30, 2013, that sent a second-round pick in 2013 (39th overall) to Phoenix in exchange for a third-round pick in 2013 (73rd overall) and this pick.
7. The Columbus Blue Jackets' second-round pick went to the Pittsburgh Penguins as the result of a trade on June 30, 2013, that sent San Jose's second-round pick in 2013 (50th overall) and a third-round pick in 2013 (89th overall) to Columbus in exchange for this pick.
8. The New York Islanders' second-round pick went to the Anaheim Ducks as the result of a trade on June 22, 2012, that sent Lubomir Visnovsky to New York in exchange for this pick.
9. The Ottawa Senators' second-round pick went to the St. Louis Blues as the result of a trade on February 26, 2012, that sent Ben Bishop to Ottawa in exchange for this pick.
10. The New York Rangers' second-round pick went to the San Jose Sharks as the result of a trade on April 2, 2013, that sent Ryane Clowe to New York in exchange for Florida's third-round pick in 2013, a conditional second-round pick in 2014 and this pick.
11. The San Jose Sharks' second-round pick went to the Columbus Blue Jackets as the result of a trade on June 30, 2013, that sent a second-round pick in 2013 (44th overall) to Pittsburgh in exchange for a third-round pick in 2013 (89th overall) and this pick.
  Pittsburgh previously acquired this pick as the result of a trade on June 30, 2013, that sent Tyler Kennedy to San Jose in exchange for this pick.
12. The Toronto Maple Leafs' second-round pick went to the Chicago Blackhawks as the result of a trade on June 30, 2013, that sent Dave Bolland to Toronto in exchange for Anaheim's fourth-round pick in 2013 (117th overall), a fourth-round pick in 2014 and this pick.
13. The St. Louis Blues' second-round pick went to the Buffalo Sabres as the result of a trade on March 30, 2013, that sent Jordan Leopold to St. Louis in exchange for a conditional fifth-round pick in 2013 and this pick.
14. The Vancouver Canucks' second-round pick went to the Dallas Stars as the result of a trade on April 2, 2013, that sent Derek Roy to Vancouver in exchange for Kevin Connauton and this pick.
15. The Anaheim Ducks' second-round pick went to the Edmonton Oilers as the result of a trade on July 12, 2011, that sent Andrew Cogliano to Anaheim in exchange for this pick.
16. The Los Angeles Kings' second-round pick went to the St. Louis Blues as the result of a trade on June 30, 2013, that sent Tampa Bay's fourth-round pick in 2013 (94th overall) and St. Louis' third and fourth-round picks in 2013 (83rd and 113th overall) to Edmonton in exchange for this pick.
  Edmonton previously acquired this pick as the result of a trade on June 30, 2013, that sent a second-round pick in 2013 (37th overall) to Los Angeles in exchange for a third-round pick in 2013 (88th overall), Carolina's fourth-round pick in 2013 (96th overall) and this pick.
17. The Pittsburgh Penguins' second-round pick went to the Detroit Red Wings as a result of a trade on June 30, 2013, that sent a first round pick in 2013 (18th overall) to San Jose in return for a first round pick in 2013 (20th overall) and this pick.
  San Jose previously acquired this pick as the result of a trade on March 25, 2013, that sent Douglas Murray to Pittsburgh in exchange for a conditional second-round pick in 2014 and this pick.
18. The Winnipeg Jets received the 29th pick of this round (59th overall) as compensation for not signing 2008 first-round draft pick Daultan Leveille.
19. The Chicago Blackhawks' second-round pick went to the Washington Capitals as the result of a trade on June 30, 2013, that sent Washington's third and fourth-round picks in 2013 (84th and 114th overall) and Calgary's fifth-round pick in 2013 (127th overall) to Winnipeg in exchange for this pick.
  Winnipeg previously acquired this pick as the result of a trade on June 30, 2013, that sent Johnny Oduya to Chicago in exchange for Chicago's third-round pick in 2013 and this pick.

=== Round three ===
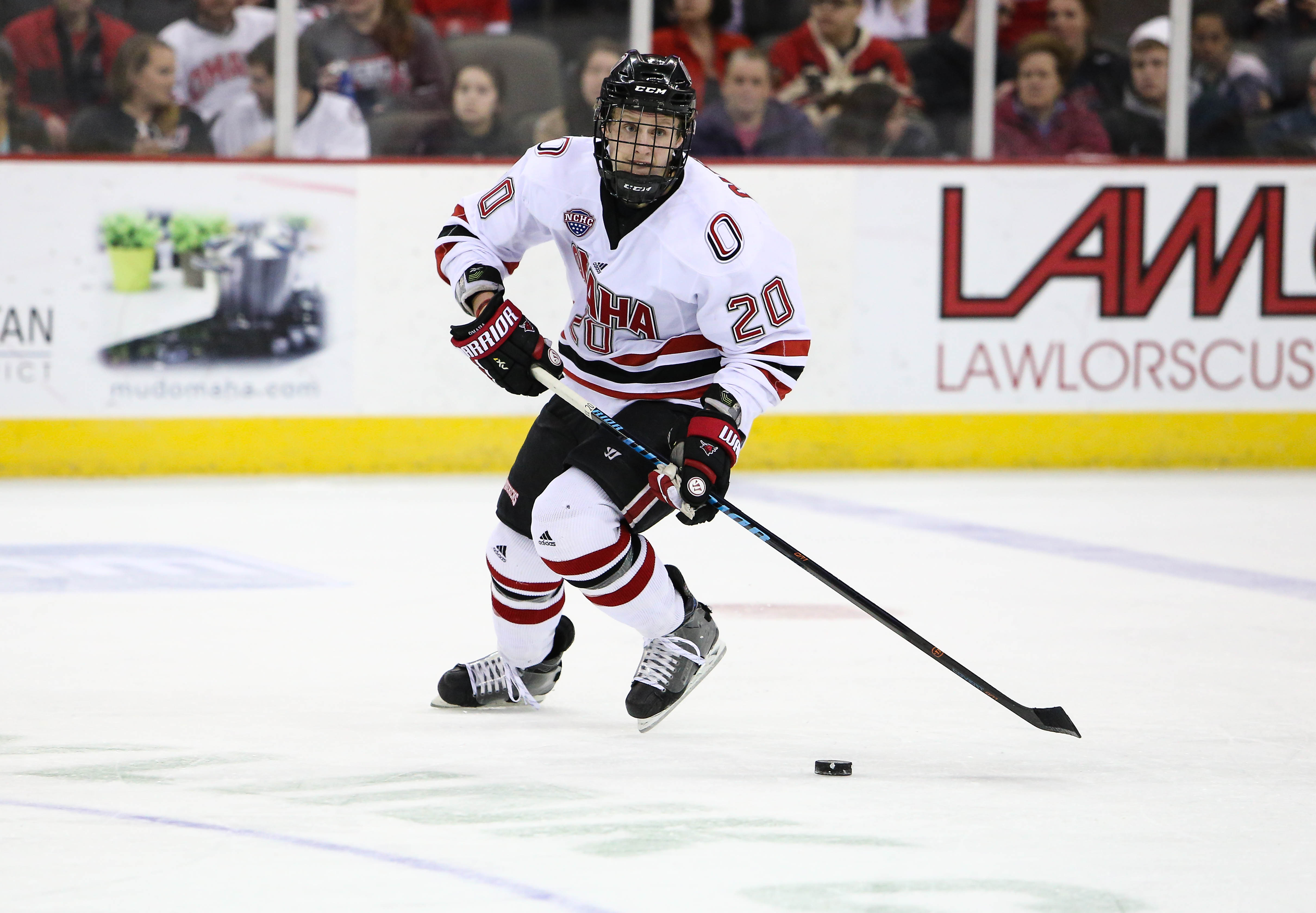
Jake Guentzel was selected 77th overall by the Pittsburgh Penguins.

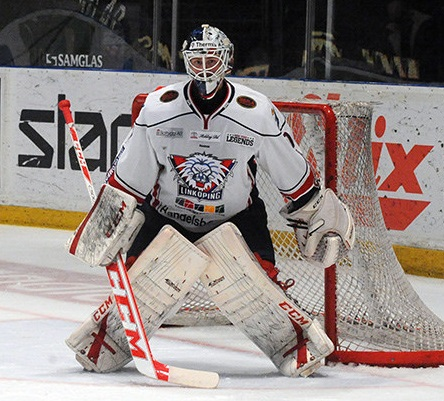
Marcus Högberg was selected 78th overall by the Ottawa Senators.

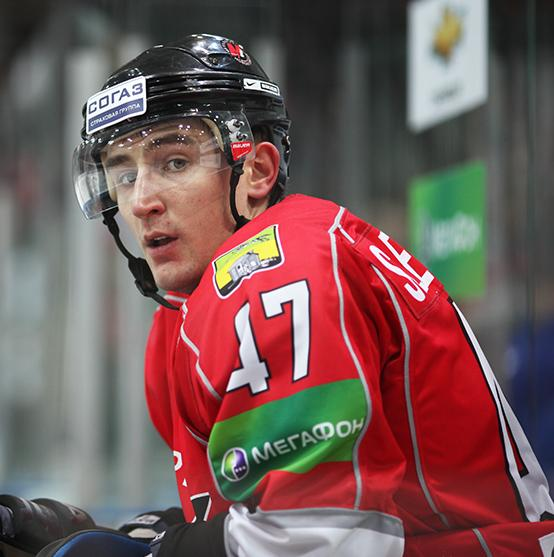
Anton Slepyshev was selected 88th overall by the Edmonton Oilers.

#	Player	Nationality	NHL team	College/junior/club team
62	Yan-Pavel Laplante (C)	Canada	Phoenix Coyotes (from Florida via NY Rangers and San Jose)^{1}	P.E.I. Rocket (QMJHL)
63	Spencer Martin (G)	Canada	Colorado Avalanche	Mississauga Steelheads (OHL)
64	Jonathan-Ismael Diaby (D)	Canada	Nashville Predators (from Tampa Bay)^{2}	Victoriaville Tigres (QMJHL)
65	Adam Tambellini (C)	Canada	New York Rangers (from Nashville)^{3}	Surrey Eagles (BCHL)
66	Brett Pesce (D)	United States	Carolina Hurricanes	New Hampshire Wildcats (HEA)
67	Keegan Kanzig (D)	Canada	Calgary Flames	Victoria Royals (WHL)
68	Niklas Hansson (D)	Sweden	Dallas Stars (from Edmonton)^{4}	Rogle BK J20 (SE)
69	Nicholas Baptiste (RW)	Canada	Buffalo Sabres	Sudbury Wolves (OHL)
70	Eamon McAdam (G)	United States	New York Islanders (from New Jersey via Minnesota)^{5}	Waterloo Black Hawks (USHL)
71	Connor Crisp (LW)	Canada	Montreal Canadiens (from Dallas)^{6}	Erie Otters (OHL)
72	Tyrell Goulbourne (LW)	Canada	Philadelphia Flyers	Kelowna Rockets (WHL)
73	Ryan Kujawinski (C)	Canada	New Jersey Devils (from Phoenix)^{7}	Kingston Frontenacs (OHL)
74	John Hayden (C)	United States	Chicago Blackhawks (from Winnipeg)^{8}	USA NTDP (USHL)
75	Pavel Buchnevich (LW)	Russia	New York Rangers (from Columbus)^{9}	Severstal Cherepovets (KHL)
76	Taylor Cammarata (C/LW)	United States	New York Islanders	Waterloo Black Hawks (USHL)
77	Jake Guentzel (C)	United States	Pittsburgh Penguins (from Minnesota via Philadelphia and Dallas)^{10}	Sioux City Musketeers (USHL)
78	Marcus Hogberg (G)	Sweden	Ottawa Senators	Linkopings HC J20 (SE)
79	Mattias Janmark-Nylen (C)	Sweden	Detroit Red Wings	AIK (SHL)
80	Anthony Duclair (LW)	Canada	New York Rangers	Quebec Remparts (QMJHL)
81	Kurtis Gabriel (RW)	Canada	Minnesota Wild (from San Jose)^{11}	Owen Sound Attack (OHL)
82	Carter Verhaeghe (C)	Canada	Toronto Maple Leafs	Niagara IceDogs (OHL)
83	Bogdan Yakimov (C)	Russia	Edmonton Oilers (from St. Louis)^{12}	Reaktor (MHL)
84	Jimmy Lodge (C)	United States	Winnipeg Jets (from Washington)^{13}	Saginaw Spirit (OHL)
85	Cole Cassels (C)	United States	Vancouver Canucks (from Vancouver via Florida)^{14}	Oshawa Generals (OHL)
86	Sven Andrighetto (RW)	Switzerland	Montreal Canadiens	Rouyn-Noranda Huskies (QMJHL)
87	Keaton Thompson (D)	United States	Anaheim Ducks	USA NTDP (USHL)
88	Anton Slepyshev (LW)	Russia	Edmonton Oilers (from Los Angeles)^{15}	Salavat Yulaev Ufa (KHL)
89	Oliver Bjorkstrand (RW)	Denmark	Columbus Blue Jackets (from Pittsburgh)^{16}	Portland Winterhawks (WHL)
90	Peter Cehlarik (LW)	Slovakia	Boston Bruins	Lulea J20 (SE)
91	JC Lipon (RW)	Canada	Winnipeg Jets (from Chicago)^{17}	Kamloops Blazers (WHL)

Notes

1. The Florida Panthers' third-round pick went to the Phoenix Coyotes as the result of a trade on April 3, 2013, that sent Raffi Torres to San Jose in exchange for this pick.
  San Jose previously acquired this pick as the result of a trade on April 2, 2013, that sent Ryane Clowe to the New York Rangers in exchange for New York's second-round pick in 2013, a conditional second-round pick in 2014 and this pick.
  New York previously acquired this pick as the result of a trade on February 25, 2012, that sent Wojtek Wolski to Florida in exchange for Michael Vernace and this pick.
2. The Tampa Bay Lightning's third-round pick went to the Nashville Predators as the result of a trade on June 15, 2012, that sent Anders Lindback, Kyle Wilson and Nashville's seventh-round pick in 2012 to Tampa Bay in exchange for Sebastien Caron, Minnesota and Philadelphia's second-round picks in 2012 and this pick.
3. The Nashville Predators' third-round pick went to the New York Rangers as the result of a trade on June 23, 2012, that sent New York's third-round pick in 2012 to Nashville in exchange for this pick.
4. The Edmonton Oilers' third-round pick went to the Dallas Stars as the result of a trade on January 14, 2013, that sent Mark Fistric to Edmonton in exchange for this pick.
5. The New Jersey Devils' third-round pick went to the New York Islanders as the result of a trade on June 30, 2013, that sent Nino Niederreiter to Minnesota in exchange for Cal Clutterbuck and this pick.
  Minnesota previously acquired this pick as the result of a trade on February 24, 2012, that sent Marek Zidlicky to New Jersey in exchange for Kurtis Foster, Nick Palmieri, Stephane Veilleux, Washington's second-round pick in 2012 and this pick (being conditional at the time of the trade). The conditions – New Jersey make the Eastern Conference Finals of the 2012 Stanley Cup playoffs, Zidlicky plays in 75 percent of New Jersey's games in the first two rounds – were converted on May 9, 2012.
6. The Dallas Stars' third-round pick went the Montreal Canadiens as the result of a trade February 26, 2013, that sent Erik Cole to Dallas in exchange for Michael Ryder and this pick.
7. The Phoenix Coyotes' third-round pick went to the New Jersey Devils as the result of a trade on June 30, 2013, that sent a second-round pick in 2013 (39th overall) to Phoenix in exchange for a second-round pick in 2013 (42nd overall) and this pick.
8. The Winnipeg Jets' third-round pick went to the Chicago Blackhawks as the result of a trade on June 30, 2013, that sent Michael Frolik to Winnipeg in exchange for a fifth-round pick in 2013 (134th overall) and this pick.
9. The Columbus Blue Jackets' third-round pick went to the New York Rangers as the result of a trade on July 23, 2012, that sent Artem Anisimov, Brandon Dubinsky, Tim Erixon and a first-round pick in 2013 to Columbus in exchange for Rick Nash, Steven Delisle and this pick (being conditional at the time of the trade). The condition – New York will not advance to the 2013 Stanley Cup Finals – was converted on May 25, 2013.
10. The Minnesota Wild's third-round pick went to the Pittsburgh Penguins as the result of a trade on March 24, 2013, that sent Joe Morrow and a fifth-round pick in 2013 to Dallas in exchange for Brenden Morrow and this pick (being conditional at the time of the trade). The condition – Pittsburgh will receive the lower of either Edmonton or Minnesota's previously acquired third-round picks, via Dallas – was converted on April 21, 2013.
  Dallas previously acquired this pick as the result of a trade on February 16, 2012, that sent Nicklas Grossmann to Philadelphia in exchange for Los Angeles' second-round pick in 2012 and this pick.
  Philadelphia previously acquired this pick as the result of a trade on June 27, 2011, that sent Darroll Powe to Minnesota in exchange for this pick.
11. The San Jose Sharks' third-round pick went to the Minnesota Wild as the result of a trade on August 6, 2011, that sent James Sheppard to San Jose in exchange for this pick.
12. The St. Louis Blues' third-round pick went to the Edmonton Oilers as the result of a trade on June 30, 2013, that sent Los Angeles' second-round pick in 2013 (57th overall) to St. Louis in exchange for Tampa Bay's fourth-round pick in 2013 (94th overall), a fourth-round pick in 2013 (113th overall) and this pick.
13. The Washington Capitals' third-round pick went to the Winnipeg Jets as the result of a trade on June 30, 2013, that sent Chicago's second-round pick in 2013 (61st overall) to Washington in exchange for a fourth-round pick in 2013 (114th overall), Calgary's fifth-round pick in 2013 (127th overall) and this pick.
14. The Vancouver Canucks' third-round pick was re-acquired from the Florida Panthers as the result of a trade on October 22, 2011, that sent Mikael Samuelsson and Marco Sturm to Florida in exchange for David Booth, Steven Reinprecht and this pick.
  Florida previously acquired the pick as the result of a trade on February 28, 2011, that sent Chris Higgins to Vancouver in exchange for Evan Oberg and this pick.
15. The Los Angeles Kings' third-round pick went to the Edmonton Oilers as the result of a trade on June 30, 2013, that sent a second-round pick in 2013 (37th overall) to Los Angeles in exchange for a second-round pick in 2013 (57th overall), Carolina's fourth-round pick in 2013 (96th overall) and this pick.
16. The Pittsburgh Penguins' third-round pick went to the Columbus Blue Jackets as the result of a trade on June 30, 2013, that sent a second-round pick in 2013 (44th overall) to Pittsburgh in exchange for San Jose's second-round pick in 2013 (50th overall) and this pick.
17. The Chicago Blackhawks' third-round pick went to the Winnipeg Jets as the result of a trade on February 27, 2012, that sent Johnny Oduya to Chicago in exchange for Chicago's second-round pick in 2013 and this pick.

=== Round four ===
#	Player	Nationality	NHL team	College/junior/club team
92	Evan Cowley (G)	United States	Florida Panthers	Wichita Falls Wildcats (NAHL)
93	Mason Geertsen (D)	Canada	Colorado Avalanche	Vancouver Giants (WHL)
94	Jackson Houck (RW)	Canada	Edmonton Oilers (from Tampa Bay via St. Louis)^{1}	Vancouver Giants (WHL)
95	Felix Girard (C)	Canada	Nashville Predators	Baie-Comeau Drakkar (QMJHL)
96	Kyle Platzer (C)	Canada	Edmonton Oilers (from Carolina via Los Angeles)^{2}	London Knights (OHL)
97	Michael Downing (D)	United States	Florida Panthers (from Calgary)^{3}	Dubuque Fighting Saints (USHL)
98	Matt Buckles (C)	Canada	Florida Panthers (from Edmonton)^{4}	St. Michael's Buzzers (OJHL)
99	Juuse Saros (G)	Finland	Nashville Predators (from Buffalo)^{5}	HPK (SM-liiga)
100	Miles Wood (LW)	United States	New Jersey Devils	Noble and Greenough Bulldogs (NEPSAC)
101	Nick Paul (LW)	Canada	Dallas Stars	Brampton Battalion (OHL)
102	Tobias Lindberg (RW)	Sweden	Ottawa Senators (from Philadelphia via Tampa Bay)^{6}	Djurgardens IF J20 (SE)
103	Justin Auger (RW)	Canada	Los Angeles Kings (from Phoenix via Columbus and Philadelphia)^{7}	Guelph Storm (OHL)
104	Andrew Copp (C)	United States	Winnipeg Jets	Michigan Wolverines (CCHA)
105	Nick Moutrey (C/LW)	Canada	Columbus Blue Jackets	Saginaw Spirit (OHL)
106	Stephon Williams (G)	United States	New York Islanders	Minnesota State Mavericks (WCHA)
107	Dylan Labbe (D)	Canada	Minnesota Wild	Shawinigan Cataractes (QMJHL)
108	Ben Harpur (D)	Canada	Ottawa Senators	Guelph Storm (OHL)
109	David Pope (LW)	Canada	Detroit Red Wings	West Kelowna Warriors (BCHL)
110	Ryan Graves (D)	Canada	New York Rangers	P.E.I. Rocket (QMJHL)
111	Robin Norell (D)	Sweden	Chicago Blackhawks (from San Jose via Chicago and San Jose)^{8}	Djurgardens IF J20 (SE)
112	Zach Pochiro (LW)	United States	St. Louis Blues (from Toronto via Nashville)^{9}	Prince George Cougars (WHL)
113	Aidan Muir (W)	Canada	Edmonton Oilers (from St. Louis)^{10}	Victory Honda (MWEHL)
114	Jan Kostalek (D)	Czech Republic	Winnipeg Jets (from Washington)^{11}	Rimouski Oceanic (QMJHL)
115	Jordan Subban (D)	Canada	Vancouver Canucks	Belleville Bulls (OHL)
116	Martin Reway (LW)	Slovakia	Montreal Canadiens	Gatineau Olympiques (QMJHL)
117	Fredrik Bergvik (G)	Sweden	San Jose Sharks (from Anaheim via Toronto and Chicago)^{12}	Frolunda HC J20 (SE)
118	Hudson Fasching (RW)	United States	Los Angeles Kings	USA NTDP (USHL)
119	Ryan Segalla (D)	United States	Pittsburgh Penguins	Salisbury Crimson Knights (NEPSAC)
120	Ryan Fitzgerald (C)	United States	Boston Bruins	Valley Jr. Warriors (EJHL)
121	Tyler Motte (C)	United States	Chicago Blackhawks	USA NTDP (USHL)

Notes

1. The Tampa Bay Lightning's fourth-round pick went to the Edmonton Oilers as the result of a trade on June 30, 2013, that sent Los Angeles' second-round pick in 2013 (57th overall) to St. Louis in exchange for a third and fourth-round pick in 2013 (83rd and 113th overall) and this pick.
  St. Louis previously acquired this pick as the result of a trade on July 10, 2012, that sent B. J. Crombeen and a fifth-round pick in 2014 to Tampa Bay in exchange for a fourth-round pick in 2014 and this pick.
2. The Carolina Hurricanes' fourth-round pick went to the Edmonton Oilers as the result of a trade on June 30, 2013, that sent a second-round pick in 2013 (37th overall) to Los Angeles in exchange for a second and third-round pick in 2013 (57th and 88th overall) and this pick.
  Los Angeles previously acquired this pick as the result of a trade on January 13, 2013, that sent Kevin Westgarth to Carolina in exchange for Anthony Stewart, a 6th round pick in 2014, and this pick.
3. The Calgary Flames' fourth-round pick went to the Florida Panthers as the result of a trade on June 18, 2013, that sent Corban Knight to Calgary in exchange for this pick.
4. The Edmonton Oilers' fourth-round pick went to the Florida Panthers as the result of a trade on April 3, 2013 at sent Jerred Smithson to the Oilers in exchange for this pick.
5. The Buffalo Sabres' fourth-round pick went to the Nashville Predators as the result of a trade on February 27, 2012, that sent Nashville's first-round pick in 2012 to Buffalo in exchange for Paul Gaustad and this pick.
6. The Philadelphia Flyers' fourth-round pick went to the Ottawa Senators as the result of a trade on April 3, 2013, that sent Ben Bishop to Tampa Bay in exchange for Cory Conacher and this pick.
  Tampa Bay previously acquired this pick as the result of a trade on February 18, 2012, that sent Pavel Kubina to Philadelphia in exchange for a conditional second-round pick in either 2012 or 2013 and this pick.
7. The Phoenix Coyotes' fourth-round pick went to the Los Angeles Kings as the result of a trade on February 26, 2013, that sent Simon Gagne to Philadelphia in exchange for this pick (being conditional at the time of the trade). The condition – Los Angeles will receive a fourth-round pick in 2013 if Philadelphia fails to make the 2013 Stanley Cup Playoffs – was converted on April 19, 2013.
  Philadelphia previously acquired this pick as a result of a trade on June 22, 2012, that sent Sergei Bobrovsky to Columbus in exchange for Ottawa's second-round pick in 2012, Vancouver's fourth-round pick in 2012, and this pick.
  Columbus previously acquired this pick as a result of a trade on February 22, 2012, that sent Antoine Vermette to Phoenix in exchange for Curtis McElhinney, Ottawa's second-round pick in 2012 and this pick (being conditional at the time of the trade). The condition - Phoenix wins at least one round in the 2012 Stanley Cup playoffs - was converted on April 23, 2012.
8. The San Jose Sharks' fourth-round pick went to the Chicago Blackhawks as the result of a trade on June 30, 2013, that sent Anaheim's fourth-round pick in 2013 (117th overall) and a fifth-round pick in 2013 (151st overall) to San Jose in exchange for a fifth-round pick in 2014 and this pick.
  San Jose previously re-acquired this pick as the result of a trade on April 1, 2013, that sent Michal Handzus to Chicago in exchange for this pick.
  Chicago previously acquired this pick as the result of a trade on June 23, 2012, that sent Chicago's fourth-round pick in 2012 to San Jose in exchange for Tampa Bay's seventh-round pick in 2012 and this pick.
9. The Toronto Maple Leafs' fourth-round pick went to the St. Louis Blues as the result of a trade on June 30, 2013, that sent a seventh-round pick in 2013 (203rd overall) and a fourth-round pick in 2014 to Nashville in exchange for this pick.
  Nashville previously acquired this pick as the result of a trade on July 3, 2011, that sent Cody Franson and Matthew Lombardi to Toronto in exchange for Brett Lebda, Robert Slaney and this pick (being conditional at the time of the trade). The condition – Lombardi plays in 60 or more regular season games over the course of the 2011–12 and 2012–13 NHL seasons – was converted on April 3, 2012.
10. The St. Louis Blues' fourth-round pick went to the Edmonton Oilers as the result of a trade on June 30, 2013, that sent Los Angeles' second-round pick in 2013 (57th overall) to St. Louis in exchange for a third-round pick in 2013 (83rd overall), Tampa Bay's fourth-round pick in 2013 (94th overall) and this pick.
11. The Washington Capitals' fourth-round pick went to the Winnipeg Jets as the result of a trade on June 30, 2013, that sent Chicago's second-round pick in 2013 (61st overall) to Washington in exchange for a third-round pick in 2013 (84th overall), Calgary's fifth-round pick in 2013 (127th overall) and this pick.
12. The Anaheim Ducks' fourth-round pick went to the San Jose Sharks as the result of a trade on June 30, 2013, that sent a fourth-round pick in 2013 (111th overall) and a fifth-round pick in 2014 to Chicago in exchange for a fifth-round pick in 2013 (151st overall) and this pick.
  Chicago previously acquired this pick as the result of a trade on June 30, 2013, that sent Dave Bolland to Toronto in exchange for a second-round pick in 2013 (51st overall), a fourth-round pick in 2014 and this pick.
  Toronto previously acquired this pick as the result of a trade on February 9, 2011, that sent Francois Beauchemin to Anaheim in exchange for Joffrey Lupul, Jake Gardiner and this pick (being conditional at the time of the trade). The condition – Toronto will receive a fourth-round pick if Joffrey Lupul is on the roster for 40 or more games in the 2012–13 season with the club – was converted on April 10, 2013.

=== Round five ===
#	Player	Nationality	NHL team	College/junior/club team
122	Christopher Clapperton (LW)	Canada	Florida Panthers	Blainville-Boisbriand Armada (QMJHL)
123	Will Butcher (D)	United States	Colorado Avalanche	USA NTDP (USHL)
124	Kristers Gudlevskis (G)	Latvia	Tampa Bay Lightning	HK Riga (MHL)
125	Saku Maenalanen (RW)	Finland	Nashville Predators	Karpat Jr. (FINLAND-JR)
126	Brent Pedersen (LW)	Canada	Carolina Hurricanes	Kitchener Rangers (OHL)
127	Tucker Poolman (D)	United States	Winnipeg Jets (from Calgary via Washington)^{1}	Omaha Lancers (USHL)
128	Evan Campbell (LW)	Canada	Edmonton Oilers	Langley Rivermen (BCHL)
129	Cal Petersen (G)	United States	Buffalo Sabres	Waterloo Black Hawks (USHL)
130	Gustav Possler (LW)	Sweden	Buffalo Sabres (from New Jersey via Los Angeles and Florida)^{2}	MODO J20 (SE)
131	Cole Ully (LW)	Canada	Dallas Stars	Kamloops Blazers (WHL)
132	Terrance Amorosa (D)	Canada	Philadelphia Flyers	Holderness Blue Bulls (NEPSAC)
133	Connor Clifton (D)	United States	Phoenix Coyotes	USA NTDP (USHL)
134	Luke Johnson (C)	United States	Chicago Blackhawks (from Winnipeg)^{3}	Lincoln Stars (USHL)
135	Eric Roy (D)	Canada	Calgary Flames (from Columbus)^{4}	Brandon Wheat Kings (WHL)
136	Victor Crus Rydberg (C)	Sweden	New York Islanders	Linkopings HC J20 (SE)
137	Carson Soucy (D)	Canada	Minnesota Wild	Spruce Grove Saints (AJHL)
138	Vincent Dunn (C)	Canada	Ottawa Senators	Val-d'Or Foreurs (QMJHL)
139	Mitchell Wheaton (D)	Canada	Detroit Red Wings	Kelowna Rockets (WHL)
140	Teemu Kivihalme (D)	United States	Nashville Predators (from NY Rangers)^{5}	Burnsville Blaze (MSHSL)
141	Michael Brodzinski (D)	United States	San Jose Sharks	Muskegon Lumberjacks (USHL)
142	Fabrice Herzog (RW)	Switzerland	Toronto Maple Leafs	EV Zug (NLA)
143	Anthony Florentino (D)	United States	Buffalo Sabres (from St. Louis)^{6}	South Kent Cardinals (NEPSAC)
144	Blake Heinrich (D)	United States	Washington Capitals	Sioux City Musketeers (USHL)
145	Anton Cederholm (D)	Sweden	Vancouver Canucks	Rogle BK J20 (SE)
146	Patrik Bartosak (G)	Czech Republic	Los Angeles Kings (from Montreal)^{7}	Red Deer Rebels (WHL)
147	Grant Besse (RW)	United States	Anaheim Ducks	Omaha Lancers (USHL)
148	Jonny Brodzinski (RW)	United States	Los Angeles Kings	St. Cloud State Huskies (WCHA)
149	Matej Paulovic (LW)	Slovakia	Dallas Stars (from Pittsburgh)^{8}	Farjestad BK J20 (SE)
150	Wiley Sherman (D)	United States	Boston Bruins	Hotchkiss Bearcats (NEPSAC)
151	Gage Ausmus (D)	United States	San Jose Sharks (from Chicago)^{9}	USA NTDP (USHL)

Notes

1. The Calgary Flames' fifth-round pick went to the Winnipeg Jets as the result of a trade on June 30, 2013, that sent Chicago's second-round pick in 2013 (61st overall) to Washington in exchange for a third and fourth-round pick in 2013 (84th and 114th overall) and this pick.
  Washington previously acquired this pick as the result of a trade on June 27, 2012, that sent Dennis Wideman to Calgary in exchange for Jordan Henry and this pick.
2. The New Jersey Devils' fifth-round pick went to the Buffalo Sabres as the result of a trade on March 15, 2013, that sent T. J. Brennan to Florida in exchange for this pick.
  Florida previously acquired this pick as the result of a trade on February 8, 2013, that sent Keaton Ellerby to Los Angeles in exchange for this pick.
  Los Angeles previously acquired this pick as the result of a trade on February 6, 2013, that sent Andrei Loktionov to New Jersey in exchange for this pick.
3. The Winnipeg Jets' fifth-round pick went to the Chicago Blackhawks as the result of a trade on June 30, 2013, that sent Michael Frolik to Winnipeg in exchange for a third-round pick in 2013 (74th overall) and this pick.
4. The Columbus Blue Jackets' fifth-round pick went to the Calgary Flames as the result of a trade on April 3, 2013, that sent Blake Comeau to Columbus in exchange for this pick.
5. The New York Rangers' fifth-round pick went to the Nashville Predators as the result of a trade on June 23, 2012, that sent Nashville's fifth-round pick in 2012 to New York in exchange for this pick.
6. The St. Louis Blues' fifth-round pick went to the Buffalo Sabres as the result of a trade on March 30, 2013, that sent Jordan Leopold to St. Louis in exchange for a second-round pick in 2013 and this pick (being conditional at the time of the trade). The condition – Buffalo will receive a fifth-round pick in 2013 if St. Louis fails to advance to the second round of the 2013 Stanley Cup playoffs – was converted on May 10, 2013.
7. The Montreal Canadiens' fifth-round pick went to the Los Angeles Kings as the result of a trade on April 2, 2013, that sent Davis Drewiske to Montreal in exchange for this pick.
8. The Pittsburgh Penguins' fifth-round pick went to the Dallas Stars as the result of a trade on March 24, 2013, that sent Brenden Morrow and Minnesota's third-round pick in 2013 to Pittsburgh in exchange for Joe Morrow and this pick.
9. The Chicago Blackhawks' fifth-round pick went to the San Jose Sharks as the result of a trade on June 30, 2013, that sent a fourth-round pick in 2013 (111th overall) and a fifth-round pick in 2014 to Chicago in exchange for Anaheim's fourth-round pick in 2013 (117th overall) and this pick.

=== Round six ===
#	Player	Nationality	NHL team	College/junior/club team
152	Josh Brown (D)	Canada	Florida Panthers	Oshawa Generals (OHL)
153	Ben Storm (D)	United States	Colorado Avalanche	Muskegon Lumberjacks (USHL)
154	Henri Ikonen (LW)	Finland	Tampa Bay Lightning	Kingston Frontenacs (OHL)
155	Emil Pettersson (C)	Sweden	Nashville Predators	Timra IK (SHL/Swe-2)
156	Tyler Ganly (D)	Canada	Carolina Hurricanes	Sault Ste. Marie Greyhounds (OHL)
157	Tim Harrison (RW)	United States	Calgary Flames	Dexter Varsity (NEPSAC)
158	Ben Betker (D)	Canada	Edmonton Oilers	Everett Silvertips (WHL)
159	Sean Malone (C)	United States	Buffalo Sabres	USA NTDP (USHL)
160	Myles Bell (LW)	Canada	New Jersey Devils	Kelowna Rockets (WHL)
161	Chris Leblanc (RW)	United States	Ottawa Senators (from Dallas)^{1}	South Shore Kings (EJHL)
162	Merrick Madsen (G)	United States	Philadelphia Flyers	Proctor Academy Hornets (NEPSAC)
163	Brendan Burke (G)	United States	Phoenix Coyotes	Portland Winterhawks (WHL)
164	Dane Birks (D)	Canada	Pittsburgh Penguins (from Winnipeg)^{2}	Merritt Centennials (BCHL)
165	Markus Soberg (RW)	Norway	Columbus Blue Jackets	Frolunda HC J20 (SE)
166	Alan Quine (C)	Canada	New York Islanders	Belleville Bulls (OHL)
167	Avery Peterson (C)	United States	Minnesota Wild	Grand Rapids Thunderhawks (MSHSL)
168	Quentin Shore (C)	United States	Ottawa Senators	Denver Pioneers (WCHA)
169	Marc McNulty (D)	Canada	Detroit Red Wings	Prince George Cougars (WHL)
170	Mackenzie Skapski (G)	Canada	New York Rangers	Kootenay Ice (WHL)
171	Tommy Veilleux (LW)	Canada	Nashville Predators (from San Jose)^{3}	Victoriaville Tigres (QMJHL)
172	Antoine Bibeau (G)	Canada	Toronto Maple Leafs	P.E.I. Rocket (QMJHL)
173	Santeri Saari (D)	Finland	St. Louis Blues	Jokerit (SM-liiga)
174	Brian Pinho (C)	United States	Washington Capitals	St. John's Prep Eagles (USHS-MA)
175	Mike Williamson (D)	Canada	Vancouver Canucks	Spruce Grove Saints (AJHL)
176	Jeremy Gregoire (C)	Canada	Montreal Canadiens	Baie-Comeau Drakkar (QMJHL)
177	Miro Aaltonen (C)	Finland	Anaheim Ducks	Espoo Blues (SM-liiga)
178	Zac Leslie (D)	Canada	Los Angeles Kings	Guelph Storm (OHL)
179	Blaine Byron (C)	Canada	Pittsburgh Penguins	Smiths Falls Bears (CCHL)
180	Anton Blidh (LW)	Sweden	Boston Bruins	Frolunda HC J20 (SE)
181	Anthony Louis (C)	United States	Chicago Blackhawks	USA NTDP (USHL)

Notes

1. The Dallas Stars' sixth-round pick went to the Ottawa Senators as the result of a trade on June 7, 2013, that sent Sergei Gonchar to Dallas in exchange for this pick (being conditional at the time of the trade). The condition – Ottawa will receive a sixth-round pick in 2013 if Gonchar signs with Dallas prior to the 2013 NHL Entry Draft – was converted on June 8, 2013.
2. The Winnipeg Jets' sixth-round pick went to the Pittsburgh Penguins as the result of a trade on February 13, 2013, that sent Eric Tangradi to Winnipeg in exchange for this pick (being conditional at the time of the trade). The condition – Pittsburgh will receive a sixth-round pick in 2013 if Tangradi plays a certain number of games for Winnipeg – the date of conversion in unknown.
3. The San Jose Sharks' sixth-round pick went to the Nashville Predators as the result of a trade on April 3, 2013, that sent Scott Hannan to San Jose in exchange for this pick (being conditional at the time of the trade). The condition – Nashville will receive a sixth-round pick in 2013 if Hannan appears in one playoff game in the 2013 Stanley Cup playoffs for the Sharks – was converted on May 1, 2013.

=== Round seven ===
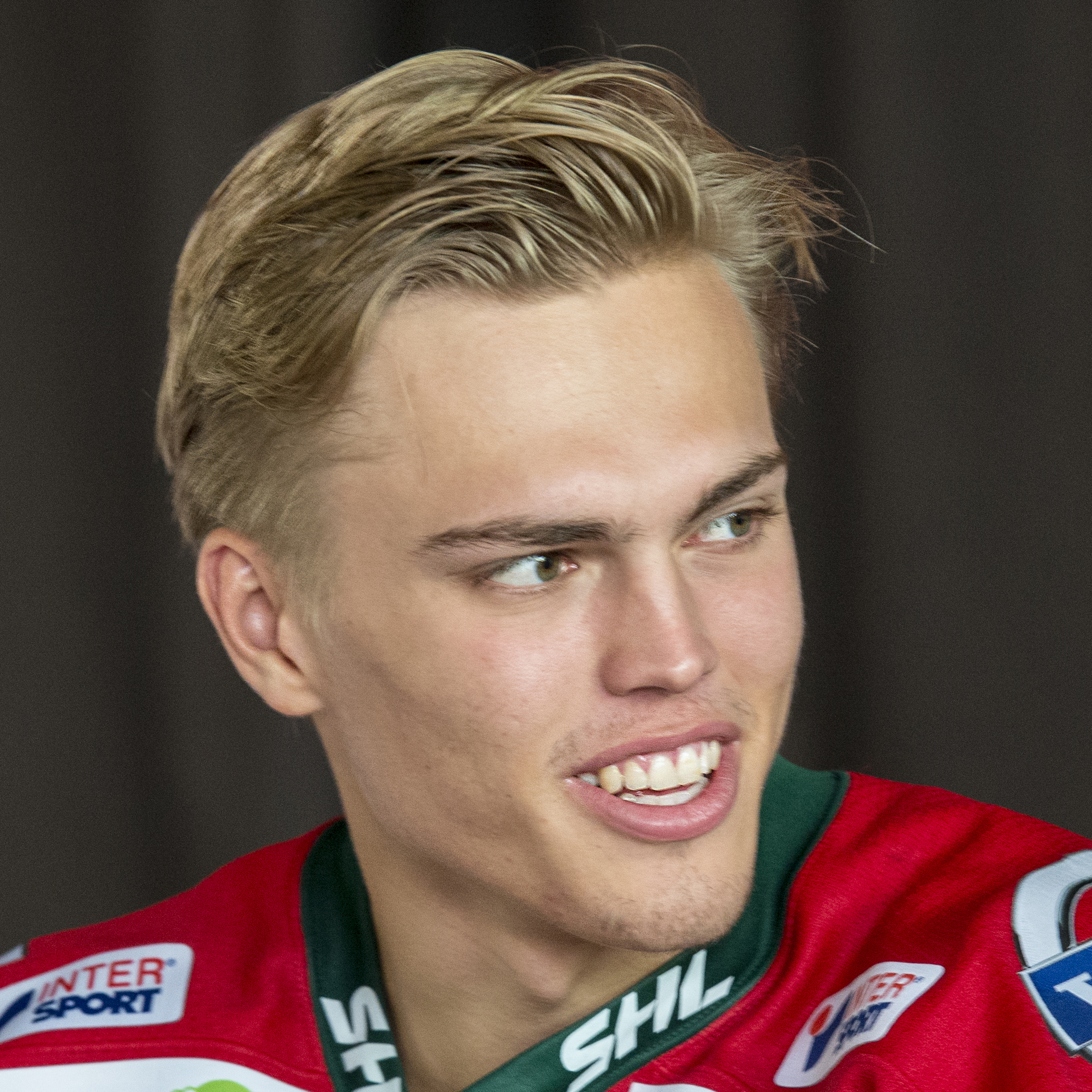
Andreas Johnsson, chosen 202nd overall by the Toronto Maple Leafs.

#	Player	Nationality	NHL team	College/junior/club team
182	Aleksi Makela (D)	Finland	Dallas Stars (from Florida)^{1}	Ilves (SM-liiga)
183	Wilhelm Westlund (D)	Sweden	Colorado Avalanche	Farjestad BK (SHL)
184	Saku Salminen (C)	Finland	Tampa Bay Lightning	Jokerit (SM-liiga)
185	Wade Murphy (RW)	Canada	Nashville Predators	Penticton Vees (BCHL)
186	Joel Vermin (RW)	Switzerland	Tampa Bay Lightning (from Carolina)^{2}	SC Bern (NLA)
187	Rushan Rafikov (D)	Russia	Calgary Flames	Loko Yaroslavl (MHL)
188	Gregory Chase (C/RW)	Canada	Edmonton Oilers	Calgary Hitmen (WHL)
189	Eric Locke (C)	Canada	Buffalo Sabres	Saginaw Spirit (OHL)
190	Brenden Kichton (D)	Canada	Winnipeg Jets (from New Jersey)^{3}	Spokane Chiefs (WHL)
191	Dominik Kubalík (LW)	Czech Republic	Los Angeles Kings (from Dallas)^{4}	Sudbury Wolves (OHL)
192	David Drake (D)	United States	Philadelphia Flyers	Des Moines Buccaneers (USHL)
193	Jedd Soleway (C)	Canada	Phoenix Coyotes	Penticton Vees (BCHL)
194	Marcus Karlstrom (D)	Sweden	Winnipeg Jets	AIK J20 (SE)
195	Peter Quenneville (C/RW)	Canada	Columbus Blue Jackets	Dubuque Fighting Saints (USHL)
196	Kyle Burroughs (D)	Canada	New York Islanders	Regina Pats (WHL)
197	Nolan De Jong (D)	Canada	Minnesota Wild	Victoria Grizzlies (BCHL)
198	John Gilmour (D)	Canada	Calgary Flames (from Ottawa via Chicago)^{5}	Providence Friars (HE)
199	Hampus Melen (RW)	Sweden	Detroit Red Wings	Tingsryds AIF J20 (SE)
200	Alexandre Belanger (G)	Canada	Minnesota Wild (from NY Rangers)^{6}	Rouyn-Noranda Huskies (QMJHL)
201	Jacob Jackson (C)	United States	San Jose Sharks	Tartan Titans (MSHSL)
202	Andreas Johnsson (LW)	Sweden	Toronto Maple Leafs	Frolunda HC (SHL)
203	Janne Juvonen (G)	Finland	Nashville Predators (from St. Louis)^{7}	Lahti Pelicans (SM-liiga)
204	Tyler Lewington (D)	Canada	Washington Capitals	Medicine Hat Tigers (WHL)
205	Miles Liberati (D)	Canada	Vancouver Canucks	London Knights (OHL)
206	MacKenzie Weegar (D)	Canada	Florida Panthers (from Montreal)^{8}	Halifax Mooseheads (QMJHL)
207	Emil Galimov (LW)	Russia	San Jose Sharks (from Anaheim via Colorado)^{9}	Lokomotiv Yaroslavl (KHL)
208	Anthony Brodeur (G)	United States	New Jersey Devils (from Los Angeles)^{10}	Shattuck-St. Mary's Sabres (USHS-MN)
209	Troy Josephs (LW)	Canada	Pittsburgh Penguins	St. Michael's Buzzers (OJHL)
210	Mitchell Dempsey (LW)	Canada	Boston Bruins	Sault Ste. Marie Greyhounds (OHL)
211	Robin Press (D)	Sweden	Chicago Blackhawks	Sodertalje SK (Swe-2)

Notes

1. The Florida Panthers' seventh-round pick went to the Dallas Stars as the result of a trade on June 23, 2012, that sent Dallas' seventh-round pick in 2012 to Florida in exchange for this pick.
2. The Carolina Hurricanes' seventh-round pick went the Tampa Bay Lightning as the result of a trade on April 2, 2013, that sent Marc-Andre Bergeron to Carolina in exchange for Adam Hall and this pick.
3. The New Jersey Devils' seventh-round pick went to the Winnipeg Jets as the result of a trade on February 13, 2013, that sent Alexei Ponikarovsky to New Jersey in exchange for a fourth-round pick in 2014 and this pick.
4. The Dallas Stars' seventh-round pick went to the Los Angeles Kings as the result of a trade on June 23, 2012, that sent Edmonton's seventh-round pick in 2012 to Dallas in exchange for this pick.
5. The Ottawa Senators' seventh-round pick went to the Calgary Flames as the result of a trade on January 21, 2013, that sent Henrik Karlsson to Chicago in exchange for this pick.
  Chicago previously acquired this pick as the result of a trade on December 2, 2011, that sent Rob Klinkhammer to Ottawa in exchange for this pick (being conditional at the time of the trade). The condition – Klinkhammer plays at least five 2011–12 regular season games for Ottawa – was converted on March 14, 2012, when Klinkhammer appeared in a game against the Montreal Canadiens.
6. The New York Rangers' seventh-round pick went to the Minnesota Wild as the result of a trade on February 3, 2012, that sent Casey Wellman to New York in exchange for Erik Christensen and this pick (being conditional at the time of the trade). The condition - Christensen is not re-signed by Minnesota for the 2012–13 NHL season - was converted on June 5, 2012, when Christensen signed with HC Lev Praha of the KHL.
7. The St. Louis Blues' seventh-round pick went to the Nashville Predators as the result of a trade on June 30, 2013, that sent Toronto's fourth-round pick in 2013 (112th overall) to St. Louis in exchange for a fourth-round pick in 2014 and this pick.
8. The Montreal Canadiens' seventh-round pick went to the Florida Panthers as the result of a trade on June 30, 2013, that sent a seventh-round pick in 2014 to Montreal in exchange for this pick.
9. The Anaheim Ducks' seventh-round pick went to the San Jose Sharks as the result of a trade on February 27, 2012, that sent Jamie McGinn, Mike Connolly and Michael Sgarbossa to Colorado in exchange for Daniel Winnik, TJ Galiardi and this pick.
  Colorado previously acquired this pick as the result of a trade on October 8, 2011, that sent Kyle Cumiskey to Anaheim in exchange for Jake Newton and this pick (being conditional at the time of the trade). The condition – Cumiskey plays in less than 45 2011–12 regular season games for Anaheim – was converted on January 4, 2012, when Cumiskey did not play in Anaheim's first 38 games of the season.
10. The Los Angeles Kings' seventh-round pick went to the New Jersey Devils as the result of a trade on June 30, 2013, that sent a seventh-round pick in 2015 to Los Angeles in exchange for this pick.

== Draftees based on nationality ==
Rank	Country	Picks	Percent	Top Selection
	North America	153	72.5%	
1	Canada	100	47.4%	Nathan MacKinnon, 1st
2	United States	53	25.1%	Seth Jones, 4th
	Europe	58	27.5%	
3	Sweden	25	11.8%	Elias Lindholm, 5th
4	Finland	11	5.2%	Aleksander Barkov Jr., 2nd
5	Russia	8	3.8%	Valeri Nichushkin, 10th
6	Switzerland	4	1.9%	Mirco Mueller, 18th
	Slovakia	4	1.9%	Marko Dano, 27th
8	Czech Republic	3	1.4%	Jan Kostalek, 114th
9	Denmark	1	0.5%	Oliver Bjorkstrand, 89th
	Latvia	1	0.5%	Kristers Gudlevskis, 124th
	Norway	1	0.5%	Markus Soberg, 165th

=== North American draftees by state/province ===
Rank	State/Province	Selections	Top Selection
1	Ontario	34	Sean Monahan, 6th
2	Quebec	24	Jonathan Drouin, 3rd
3	Alberta	19	Josh Morrissey, 13th
4	Minnesota	14	Connor Hurley, 38th
5	British Columbia	13	Curtis Lazar, 17th
6	Massachusetts	7	Miles Wood, 100th
7	Michigan	5	Michael McCarron, 25th
8	Illinois	4	Ryan Hartman, 30th
	New York	4	Steve Santini, 42nd
10	Saskatchewan	3	Morgan Klimchuk, 28th
	Connecticut	3	Adam Erne, 33rd
	Pennsylvania	3	Eamon McAdam, 70th
13	Nova Scotia	2	Nathan MacKinnon, 1st
	Manitoba	2	Ryan Pulock, 15th
	Wisconsin	2	Ian McCoshen, 31st
	North Dakota	2	Keaton Thompson, 87th
	Colorado	2	Evan Cowley, 92nd
	New Jersey	2	Connor Clifton, 133rd
19	Texas	1	Seth Jones, 4th
	New Hampshire	1	Zach Sanford, 61st
	Ohio	1	Cole Cassels, 85th
	Alaska	1	Stephon Williams, 106th
	Nevada	1	Zach Pochiro, 112th
	Iowa	1	Cal Petersen, 129th
	California	1	Merrick Madesen, 162nd
	Arizona	1	Brendan Burke, 163rd

== See also ==
- 2010–11 NHL transactions
- 2011–12 NHL transactions
- 2012–13 NHL transactions
- 2013–14 NHL season
- List of first overall NHL draft picks
- List of NHL players
