= Jade Downie-Landry =

Canadian ice hockey player (born 1995)

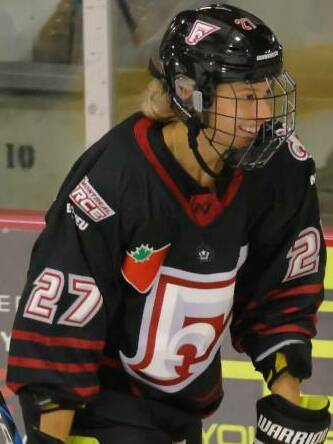
- Downie-Landry with the Montreal Force in 2022
- Born: October 3, 1995 (age 30) Saint-Jean-sur-Richelieu, Quebec, Canada
- Height: 5 ft 9 in (175 cm)
- Weight: 148 lb (67 kg; 10 st 8 lb)
- Position: Forward
- Shoots: Left
- PWHL team Former teams: Montreal Victoire; Montreal Force; New York Sirens
- Playing career: 2022–present

Jade Downie-Landry (born October 3, 1995) is a Canadian professional ice hockey player who is a forward for the Montreal Victoire of the Professional Women's Hockey League (PWHL).

== Playing career ==
=== Amateur and post-secondary career ===
Captaining LHFDQ North at the 2013 Esso Cup, the Canadian women's under-18 club championships, Downie-Landry helped to secure the first Esso Cup victory by a Quebecois team.

Downie-Landry played three seasons with the Dawson College Blues, from 2013 to 2016. In the 2015–16 season, she recorded 63 points in 24 games and was named league MVP.

Although she considered playing college ice hockey in the United States, she ultimately chose to attend and play for McGill University, swayed in part by her father being diagnosed with leukemia. Her freshman season, 2016–17, saw her record 13 goals and 28 points in 36 games. She was named to the conference and U Sports all-rookie teams, and was selected to play with the Hockey Canada national development team.

Downie-Landry would win the McGill most outstanding scorer award in both 2017–18 and 2018–19. The latter season also saw her lead the conference in both regular season and playoff scoring, as well as named alternate captain and team MVP. Qualifying for the national championship with a second place finish in the conference tournament, she and the Martlets finished in second at the 2019 U Sports Women's Ice Hockey Championship, where she was named championship MVP.

In her senior year, Downie-Landry again led the Martlets in scoring, recording 24 goals and 45 points in 30 games, good for fourth in the league. For the third consecutive season, she was named the Martlets' most outstanding scorer. Entering the conference championship ranked fifth in U Sports, the Martlets swept the best-of-three finals against the Université de Montréal to claim the 2020 conference title. Downie-Landry recorded six goals in four playoff games, including one in the tournament-clinching victory.

The 2020–21 season would have been Downie-Landry's final year of U Sports eligibility, but the COVID-19 pandemic caused the season to be cancelled before it began on September 14, 2021.

Returning as captain in 2021–22, her final season with the Martlets, Downie-Landry led the conference in goals and points, with 14 and 27, respectively, in 15 games. Her 1.80 points per game led all of U Sports, and she recorded a point on over half of McGill's goals. McGill finished first in the regular season and second in the conference championship, and Downie-Landry was named U Sports women's hockey player of the year and McGill University female athlete of the year.

=== Professional career ===
Downie-Landry turned professional in the 2022–23 season, signing with Premier Hockey Federation (PHF) expansion franchise Montreal Force on July 25, 2022. She scored her first PHF goal in the team's inaugural outing, a 5–3 victory over the Metropolitan Riveters on November 26, 2022, in which she recorded a hat-trick and an assist for four points. She would go on to lead the Force in scoring, with 10 goals and 23 points in 24 games, and was named to the All-Star Game.

In the inaugural draft of the newly-created Professional Women's Hockey League (PWHL), Downie-Landry was selected in the ninth round, 52nd overall by New York. She signed with the club on November 1, 2023, becoming the first former PHF player to sign a PWHL contract. As she did in the PHF, she recorded her first PWHL goals with a hat-trick, in a 4–1 victory over Boston on January 20, 2024. During the 2023–24 season, she appeared in all 24 games for New York, and recorded eight goals and five assists. During the 2024–25 season, she recorded four goals and two assists in 30 games. On June 20, 2025, she signed a one-year contract with the Montreal Victoire. During the 2025–26 season, she recorded two goals in 23 regular season games and helped the Victoire win their first Walter Cup in franchise history. On June 20, 2026, she signed a two-year contract extension with the Victoire.

== Personal life ==
Downie-Landry graduated from McGill University in 2020 with a Bachelor of Arts in Psychology. She returned to pursue a Bachelor of Education in physical education. She married her wife, Lyndee Flanagan, on September 14, 2024.

== Career statistics ==
			Regular season					Playoffs
Season	Team	League	GP	G	A	Pts	PIM	GP	G	A	Pts	PIM
2013–14	Dawson College	RSEQ C	20	10	8	18	—	—	—	—	—	—
2014–15	Dawson College	RSEQ C	31	36	26	62	—	—	—	—	—	—
2015–16	Dawson College	RSEQ C	24	28	35	63	—	—	—	—	—	—
2016–17	McGill University	RSEQ	16	8	7	15	26	—	—	—	—	—
2017–18	McGill University	RSEQ	18	6	10	16	18	3	4	3	7	8
2018–19	McGill University	RSEQ	20	5	18	23	26	4	3	5	8	8
2019–20	McGill University	RSEQ	15	8	10	18	27	4	6	2	8	8
2021–22	McGill University	RSEQ	15	14	13	27	20	5	2	1	3	6
2022–23	Montreal Force	PHF	24	10	13	23	20	—	—	—	—	—
2023–24	PWHL New York	PWHL	24	8	5	13	18	—	—	—	—	—
2024–25	New York Sirens	PWHL	30	4	2	6	33	—	—	—	—	—
2025–26	Montréal Victoire	PWHL	23	2	0	2	6	3	0	0	0	0
PWHL totals			78	14	7	21	57	3	0	0	0	0

== Awards and honours ==
Award	Year	Ref
Esso Cup
Top Forward	2013	
RSEQ Collégial
All-Rookie Team	2014	
First Team All-Star	2015, 2016	
Most Valuable Player	2016	
U Sports
All-Rookie Team	2017	
Championship MVP	2019	
All-Championship Team	2019	
Second Team All-Canadian	2019, 2020	
Player of the year (Brodrick Trophy)	2022	
First Team All-Canadian	2022	
RSEQ
All-Rookie Team	2017	
First Team All-Star	2019, 2020, 2022	
Most Valuable Player	2022	
McGill University
Most Outstanding Scorer (women's ice hockey)	2018, 2019, 2020	
Most Valuable Player (women's ice hockey)	2019, 2020	
Athlete of the Year	2022	
PHF
All-Star Game	2023	
PWHL
Walter Cup champion	2026	
