= Great Northwest Showcase =

- Sport: College ice hockey
- Founded: 2012
- First season: 2012
- No. of teams: 4
- Venue: Bill Copeland Sports Centre
- Most recent champion: University of British Columbia
- Most titles: University of British Columbia (2)

The Great Northwest Showcase is a bi-annual men's ice hockey tournament hosted by Simon Fraser University of the BCIHL. The Great Northwest Showcase is meant to showcase collegiate hockey in the Vancouver area, and create a platform to showcase BCIHL players to a variety of scouts.

== Format ==
Past Competitors Include:

- Simon Fraser University Clan
- University of North Dakota Fighting Hawks
- Princeton Tigers
- Arizona State Sun Devils
- Oklahoma Sooners
- University of British Columbia Thunderbirds

The tournament lasts two rounds, with the first-round opponents being rotated from year to year. The second round features the consolation game and the championship game.

== History ==
Originally created in 2012 to gauge collegiate hockey interest in the Vancouver area the tournament became a hit. The 2012 tournament played host to ACHA powerhouse Arizona State Sun Devils and the University of Oklahoma, and well as U Sports team UBC Thunderbirds. UBC would go on to win the championship that year. On the Friday SFU played the Oklahoma Sooners winning 4-0, UBC would play the Arizona State Sundevil's, winning 8-2. On the Saturday SFU played Arizona State losing 5-3. UBC would defeat Oklahoma 4-3 in overtime to claim the inaugural Great Northwest Showcase trophy.

In 2014 competition was ramped up as Simon Fraser University would host 8 time NCAA Men's Ice Hockey Champion, the #4 ranked University of North Dakota Fighting Hawks as well as two time ECAC champion Princeton Tigers. The UBC Thunderbirds were once again involved. Simon Fraser University played the Princeton Tigers on the Friday, with the Tigers claiming an 8-1 victory. UBC would play the University of North Dakota in the other Friday game winning 3-2 in overtime. On the Saturday, North Dakota would claim a 4-3 victory over Simon Fraser to clinch 3rd place. In the final, UBC defeated Princeton 1-0 to claim their second Great Northwest Showcase title in as many tries.

== Results ==
Four games are listed for each Great Northwest Showcase game. Winners are listed in bold. Games requiring overtime are indicated by (OT).

Year	First Game	Second Game	Consolation	Final
2012	**SFU** 4-0 UO	**UBC** 8–2 ASU	**ASU** 5-3 SFU	**UBC** 4–3^{OT} ASU
2014	**UBC** 3-2^{OT} #4 UND	**PRIN** 8–1 SFU	**#4 UND** 4–3 SFU	**UBC** 1-0 PRIN
2016	SFU vs. TBD	UBC vs. TBD	TBD vs. TBD	TBD vs. TBD

== Statistics ==
Through the 2014 Great Northwest Showcase, the teams have amassed the following statistics:

School	W	L	Pct.	Great Northwest Showcase Finishes			
School	W	L	Pct.	1st	2nd	3rd	4th
University of British Columbia	4	0	1.000	2	0	0	0
University of North Dakota	1	1	.500	0	1	0	0
Princeton University	1	1	.500	0	0	1	0
Arizona State University	1	1	.500	0	0	1	0
Simon Fraser University	1	3	.250	0	1	0	1
University of Oklahoma	0	2	.000	0	0	0	1

=== Awards ===
Champions
Year	School	Coach
2012	**University of British Columbia**	Milan Dragicevic
2014	**University of British Columbia**	Milan Dragicevic
2016	TBD	TBD

== See also ==
- College Hockey
- College Rivalry
- Simon Fraser University Clan
- North Dakota Fighting Hawks
- Princeton Tigers
- Arizona State Sun Devils
