= 2016–17 BCIHL season =

2016–17 BCIHL Season
- League: BCIHL
- Sport: Ice hockey
- Teams: 5
- TV partner: FastHockey

Regular season
- League Champion: Simon Fraser University
- Top scorer: (Canada) Evan Last

Seasons
- ← 2015–16 2017–18 →

The 2016–17 season was the 11th in BCIHL history. It saw its first NHL alumni, Patrick Holland join the University of Victoria. Simon Fraser University would finish first in the league clinching the regular season championship on the final day of the season with a 3–1 win over the Trinity Western Spartans. TWU's Evan Last finished as leading scorer. In the playoffs Trinity Western defeated the four time defending league champion Selkirk College Saints two games to zero, and the University of Victoria upset regular season champions Simon Fraser University winning two games to zero. In the final the University of Victoria would once again come up with an upset, beating Trinity Western two games to one and claiming their 4th league championship.

== Regular season ==
Pos	Team	Pld	W	OTW	OTL	L	GF	GA	GD	Pts	Qualification
1	Simon Fraser University	24	18	0	2	4	104	50	+54	56	Qualification to Playoffs
2	Trinity Western University	24	16	0	2	6	77	47	+30	50	Qualification to Playoffs
3	Selkirk College	24	14	0	1	9	86	70	+16	43	Qualification to Playoffs
4	University of Victoria (C)	24	9	0	1	14	74	99	−25	28	Qualification to Playoffs
5	Eastern Washington University	24	3	0	1	20	50	125	−75	10	

Updated to match(es) played on 4 March 2017. Source:
Rules for classification: 1) points; 2) head-to-head points; 3) head-to-head goal difference; 4) head-to-head number of goals scored.
(C) Champion

== Playoffs ==
As of 4 March 2017.

Semifinals
1	Simon Fraser University	0
4	University of Victoria	2
2	Trinity Western University	2
3	Selkirk College ^{†}	0

Finals
4	University of Victoria	2
2	Trinity Western University	1

^{†} Defending champion
