= Simon Fraser Red Leafs men's ice hockey =

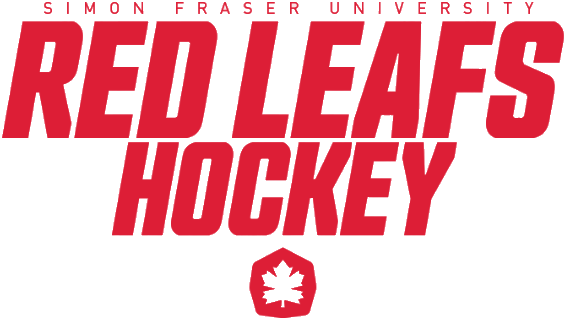
- University: Simon Fraser University
- Head coach: (Canada) Mark Coletta (Canada) Mark Soares
- Captain(s): Nick Wicks (non-conference); Nick Wagner (BCIHL)
- Alternate captain(s): Jake Keremidschieff, Tristen Cross (Non-Conference); Leeam Tivers, Max Lightfoot, Rhys Lefebvre (BCIHL)
- Arena: Bill Copeland Sports Centre; Burnaby, BC, Canada
- Colors: Red and White

Conference tournament champions
- 2008, 2010, 2011, 2022, 2023

Conference regular season champions
- 2008, 2009, 2010, 2011, 2012, 2013, 2014, 2017, 2022, 2023

Current uniform
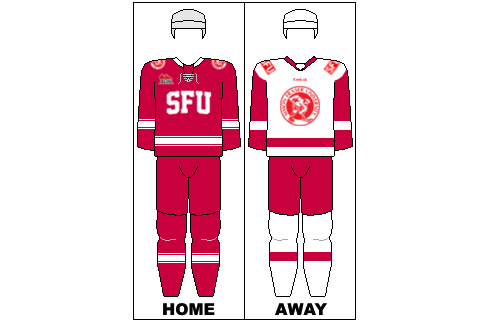

The Simon Fraser Red Leafs men's ice hockey team is the college ice hockey team that represents Simon Fraser University in Burnaby, British Columbia. The Red Leafs play at the Bill Copeland Arena and are coached by Mark Coletta. The Red Leafs ice hockey team competes in the BCIHL, as well as playing NCAA competition every year. After announcing their intent to explore full-time NCAA Division 1 status in 2016, the SFU Men's hockey program would play NCAA Div.1 games under probationary status for the 2016/17 and 2017/18 seasons.

The Red Leafs have won Four BCIHL titles. They regularly host and travel to play NCAA Division I programs, as well as an ongoing cross town rivalry with the UBC Thunderbirds of U Sports. SFU was a founding member of the BCIHL in 2006. In the summer of 2016 the university announced its intent to move the program entirely to the NCAA Division I level.

== History ==
The current incarnation of SFU hockey began in 2006 with the formation of the British Columbia Intercollegiate Hockey League. SFU did field a team in the '70s however not much is known or documented about the team. SFU made their first league final and won their first BCIHL title in 2008, following it up with another finals appearance in 2009 eventually losing to the University of Victoria. In 2010 and 2011 the Clan would win back-to-back BCIHL championships, 2011 being their most recent title. From 2008 to 2014 SFU would make the league final seven straight seasons. SFU would once again finish first in the 2016–17 BCIHL regular season.

== NCAA ==
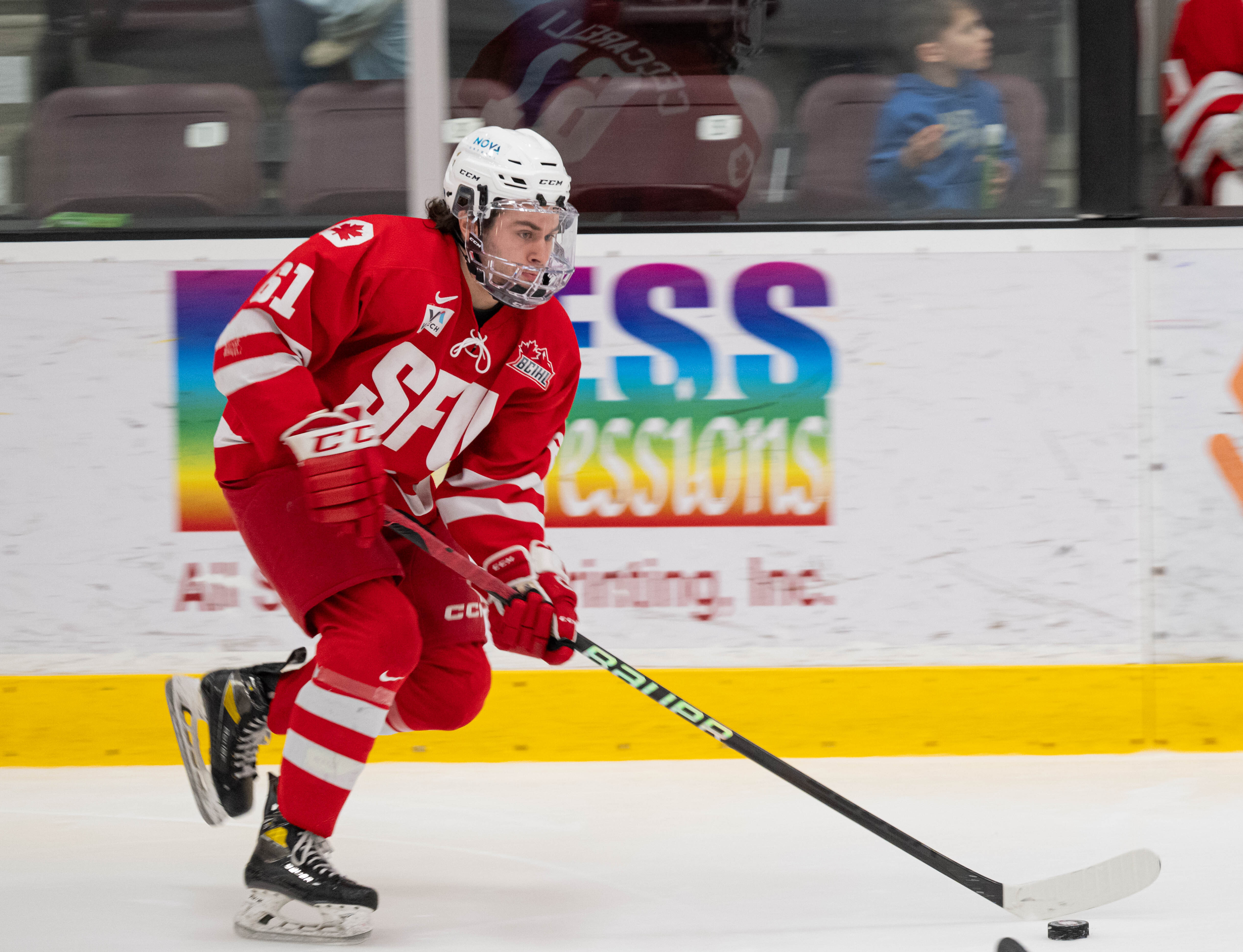
A Red Leafs men's ice hockey player during a game in 2024

Since 2012-13 Simon Fraser University has been playing NCAA Division 1 programs with increased frequency. 2012–13 saw the Clan face off against the Air Force Falcons of Atlantic Hockey. It would also see them play host to the Arizona State Sun Devils and Oklahoma Sooners. 2013-14 saw the Clan travel to college hockey hotbed Boston and take on the Sacred Heart Pioneers and College of the Holy Cross Crusaders.

That year they would also host two major historical college hockey programs in the 8 time NCAA Champion University of North Dakota Fighting Hawks, and two time ECAC champion Princeton Tigers. 2014-15 would take the Clan to Ohio to take on the perennial powerhouse Miami RedHawks who would go on to capture the NCHC championship that year, as well as the former national champion Bowling Green Falcons. 2015-16 would once again take the Clan back to Boston to play the defending national champion Providence College Friars, as well as former national champions in the Northeastern University Huskies. 2016-17 would be the first season played by the Clan under probationary NCAA Division 1 status. The season saw the Clan travel to Alaska to take on the Alaska Anchorage Seawolves and the Alaska Fairbanks Nanooks, then in February they would travel to Tempe, Arizona to take on the Arizona State Sun Devils for the second time in their history.

In May 2026, SFU Hockey announced the retirement of the Non-Conference team.

== University Hockey Classic ==
Each September, SFU Hockey meets UBC in the annual University Hockey Classic pre-season matchup. The event takes aim at building on the historic cross-town rivalry between the two schools, a rivalry that extends from hockey into other sports such as football and even academic programs. The University Hockey Classic began in 2011 with over 1600 passionate fans on hand to witness SFU defeat UBC in a two-game series and has continued yearly ever since.

== Great Northwest Showcase ==
The Great Northwest Showcase is a bi-annual men's ice hockey tournament hosted by Simon Fraser University. The Great Northwest Showcase is meant to showcase collegiate hockey in the Vancouver area, and create a platform to showcase SFU and UBC players to a variety of professional scouts.

== See also ==
- British Columbia Intercollegiate Hockey League
- Great Northwest Showcase
- Simon Fraser University
- NCAA
