= Marcus Karlström =

Swedish ice hockey player (born 1995)

- Born: 6 January 1995 (age 31) Trångsund, Sweden
- Height: 6 ft 2 in (188 cm)
- Weight: 190 lb (86 kg; 13 st 8 lb)
- Position: Defence
- Shoots: Right
- SHL team Former teams: Free agent AIK IF; Leksands IF
- NHL draft: 194th overall, 2013; Winnipeg Jets
- Playing career: 2014–present

Marcus Karlström (born 6 January 1995) is a Swedish professional ice hockey defenceman. He is currently an unrestricted free agent who most recently played with Leksands IF of the Swedish Hockey League (SHL). He has formerly played with AIK IF of the Swedish Hockey League (SHL). Karlstrom was selected by the Winnipeg Jets in the 7th round (194th overall) of the 2013 NHL entry draft.

== Playing career ==
Karlström made his Swedish Hockey League debut playing a solitary game with AIK during the 2013–14 SHL season.

During the 2018–19 season, Karlström transferred from Tingsryds AIF to Södertälje SK, later securing a two-year contract on 8 January 2019.

In the midst of the 2024–25 season, his sixth year with Almtuna IS, Karlström having posted 28 points through 42 games was signed for the remainder of the season to join Leksands IF of the SHL on 15 February 2025. He featured in 6 games with Leksands, marking his first return to the SHL since 2014.

== Career statistics ==
			Regular season					Playoffs
Season	Team	League	GP	G	A	Pts	PIM	GP	G	A	Pts	PIM
2012–13	AIK IF	J20	5	1	0	1	4	—	—	—	—	—
2013–14	AIK IF	J20	44	10	17	27	38	2	0	0	0	2
2013–14	AIK IF	SHL	1	0	0	0	0	—	—	—	—	—
2014–15	Mora IK	J20	15	3	2	5	8	—	—	—	—	—
2014–15	Mora IK	Allsv	26	0	2	2	4	3	0	0	0	0
2014–15	Visby/Roma HK	Div.1	14	1	5	6	6	—	—	—	—	—
2015–16	Austin Bruins	NAHL	51	1	23	24	26	9	0	3	3	4
2016–17	Kallinge/Ronneby IF	Div.1	38	2	6	8	26	3	0	0	0	2
2017–18	Kallinge/Ronneby IF	Div.1	40	7	7	14	14	8	0	1	1	4
2018–19	Tingsryds AIF	Allsv	12	0	4	4	4	—	—	—	—	—
2018–19	Kallinge/Ronneby IF	Div.1	11	3	9	12	4	—	—	—	—	—
2018–19	Södertälje SK	Allsv	10	0	0	0	4	—	—	—	—	—
2019–20	Almtuna IS	Allsv	48	2	9	11	22	—	—	—	—	—
2020–21	Almtuna IS	Allsv	51	4	27	31	20	2	0	0	0	0
2021–22	HV71	Allsv	32	0	5	5	4	—	—	—	—	—
2021–22	Almtuna IS	Allsv	18	3	8	11	10	—	—	—	—	—
2022–23	Almtuna IS	Allsv	49	5	18	23	20	2	0	1	1	0
2023–24	Almtuna IS	Allsv	50	9	23	32	12	2	0	1	1	2
2024–25	Almtuna IS	Allsv	42	11	17	28	22	—	—	—	—	—
2024–25	Leksands IF	SHL	6	0	1	1	0	—	—	—	—	—
SHL totals			7	0	1	1	0	—	—	—	—	—
