= Bill Copeland Sports Centre =

Multi-purpose arena in Burnaby, British Columbia

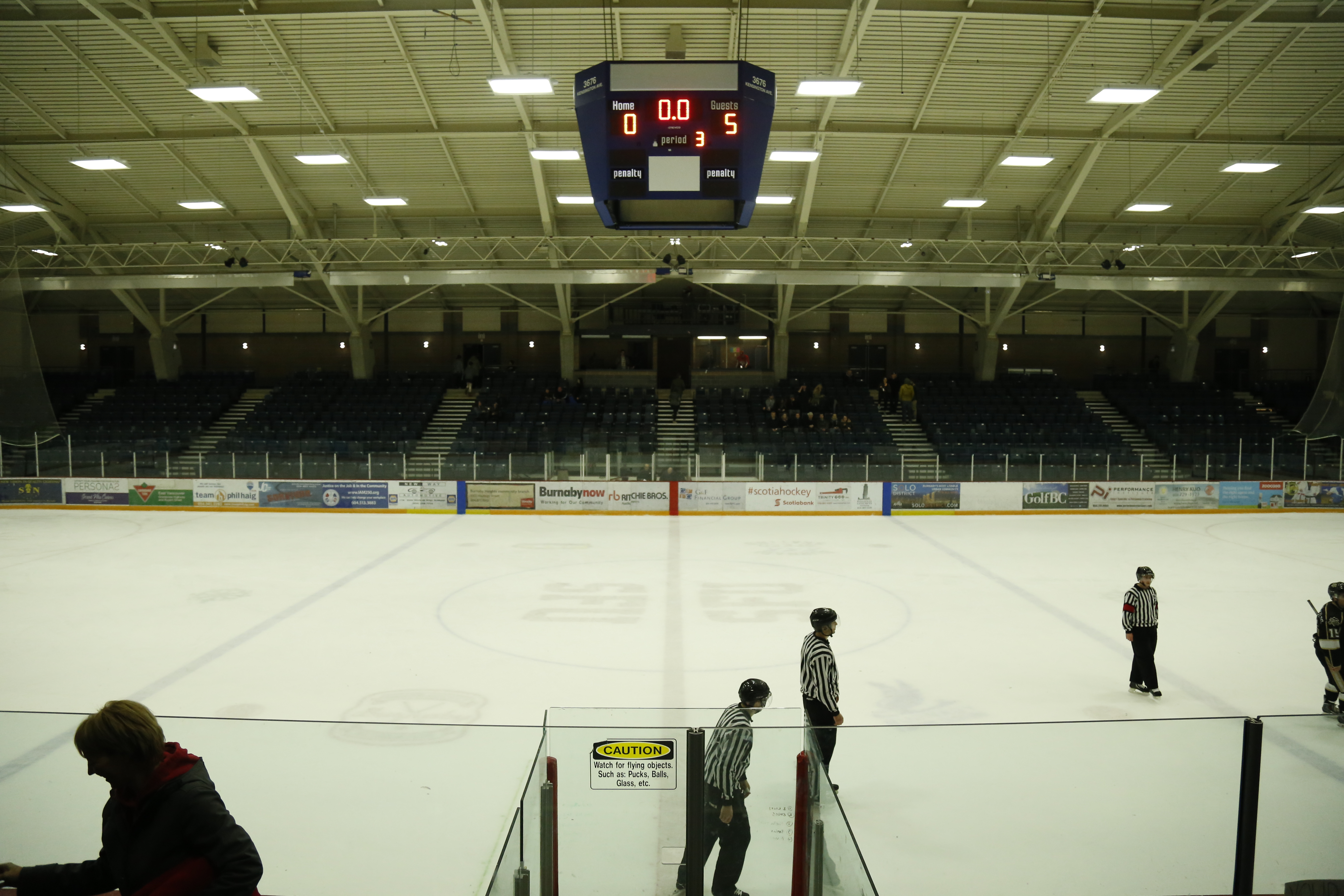
- Interactive map of Bill Copeland Sports Centre
- Full name: Bill Copeland Sports Centre
- Location: Burnaby, British Columbia, Canada
- Coordinates: 49.25198°N 122.96545°W
- Owner: City of Burnaby
- Operator: City of Burnaby
- Capacity: 2,000 seated

Tenants
- Simon Fraser Red Leafs (BCIHL); Burnaby Lakers (WLA); Vancouver North West Hawks (BCMML).

Bill Copeland Sports Centre is a 2,000-seat, multi-purpose arena in Burnaby, British Columbia. The arena is primarily used for ice hockey and lacrosse.

Bill Copeland Sports Centre was the host venue for the 2019 World Ringette Championships and the 2013 Esso Cup. It is also the home arena for the Burnaby Lakers of the Western Lacrosse Association and home arena of the Vancouver North West Hawks of the BC Hockey Major Midget League.
