= Burnaby Lakers =

Canadian lacrosse club

Burnaby Lakers
City	Burnaby, British Columbia
League	Western Lacrosse Association
Founded	1986
Home Arena	Bill Copeland Sports Centre
Colours	Green, White, Black
Head coach	Glenn Clark
Team manager	Bob Hodgson and Rick Wills

The Burnaby Lakers are a Senior "A" box lacrosse club based in Burnaby, British Columbia, Canada that play in the Western Lacrosse Association (WLA). They play out of Bill Copeland Sports Centre. Originally based in the neighboring city of Richmond, they moved to Burnaby in 1990. Historically, the Lakers have not been a very successful team. During their 4 years in Richmond, they finished last in 3 of them. In the 33 seasons since they became the Burnaby Lakers, the team has only appeared in 4 WLA championships, none of which they won, and subsequentially have had no Mann Cup success either.

== Team history ==
Burnaby Lakers

- 1991 Richmond Outlaws (transferred to Burnaby)
- 1990–present Burnaby Lakers

=== Affiliated teams ===
The Lakers also have a Jr. A team, that won the Minto Cup in 1998, 2000, 2002, 2004, & 2005.

== All time record ==
Season	Team name	Games	Win	Losses	Tie	GF	GA	Points	Playoffs
1986	Richmond Outlaws	24	9	15	0	222	248	18	Did Not Qualify
1987	Richmond Outlaws	24	9	15	0	235	256	18	Defeated in Semi-Finals
1988	Richmond Outlaws	24	8	16	0	190	236	16	Did Not Qualify
1989	Richmond Outlaws	24	7	17	0	204	262	14	Did Not Qualify
1990	Burnaby Lakers	24	10	14	0	216	232	20	Defeated in Finals
1991	Burnaby Lakers	24	8	16	0	201	241	16	Did Not Qualify
1992	Burnaby Lakers	24	14	10	0	190	179	28	Defeated in Finals
1993	Burnaby Lakers	24	12	12	0	235	234	24	Defeated in Finals
1994	Burnaby Lakers	20	4	16	0	175	225	8	Did Not Qualify
1995	Burnaby Lakers	25	11	13	1	207	236	23	Defeated in Semi-Finals
1996	Burnaby Lakers	20	10	10	0	176	199	20	Did Not Qualify
1997	Burnaby Lakers	20	1	18	1	154	212	3	Did Not Qualify
1998	Burnaby Lakers	25	4	21	0	187	273	8	Did Not Qualify
1999	Burnaby Lakers	25	5	20	0	207	276	10	Did Not Qualify
2000	Burnaby Lakers	25	11	14	0	254	286	22	Defeated in Semi-Finals
2001	Burnaby Lakers	20	9	11	0	225	253	18	Defeated in Semi-Finals
2002	Burnaby Lakers	20	11	9	0	202	208	22	Defeated in Semi-Finals
2003	Burnaby Lakers	20	8	11	1	215	230	17	Defeated in Semi-Finals
2004	Burnaby Lakers	20	14	6	0	221	199	28	Defeated in Finals
2005	Burnaby Lakers	18	8	9	1	217	213	17	Did Not Qualify
2006	Burnaby Lakers	18	12	6	0	223	177	24	Defeated in Semi-Finals
2007	Burnaby Lakers	18	12	6	0	214	192	24	Defeated in Semi-Finals
2008	Burnaby Lakers	18	9	7	2	159	162	19	Defeated in Semi-Finals
2009	Burnaby Lakers	18	2	15	1	129	206	5	Did Not Qualify
2010	Burnaby Lakers	18	6	12	0	143	179	12	Did Not Qualify
2011	Burnaby Lakers	18	7	9	2	168	172	16	Did Not Qualify
2012	Burnaby Lakers	18	9	7	2	158	161	20	Defeated in Semi-Finals
2013	Burnaby Lakers	18	10	8	0	175	173	20	Defeated in Semi-Finals
2014	Burnaby Lakers	18	11	7	0	157	152	22	Defeated in Semi-Finals
2015	Burnaby Lakers	18	9	9	0	136	154	18	Did Not Qualify
2016	Burnaby Lakers	18	10	7	1	151	133	21	Defeated in Semi-Finals
2017	Burnaby Lakers	18	12	5	1	188	141	25	Defeated in Semi-Finals
2018	Burnaby Lakers	18	6	11	1	176	201	13	Did Not Qualify
2019	Burnaby Lakers	18	10	7	1	160	156	21	Did Not Qualify
2020	season cancelled								
2021	season cancelled								
2022	Burnaby Lakers	18	4	14	0	156	235	8	Did Not Qualify
2023	Burnaby Lakers	18	5	13	0	157	206	10	Did Not Qualify
2024	Burnaby Lakers	18	5	12	1	163	188	11	Did Not Qualify
2025	Burnaby Lakers	18	5	13	0	142	158	10	Did Not Qualify
2026	Burnaby Lakers	18	4	14	0	130	213	8	Did Not Qualify
