= Patrick Holland (ice hockey) =

Canadian ice hockey player

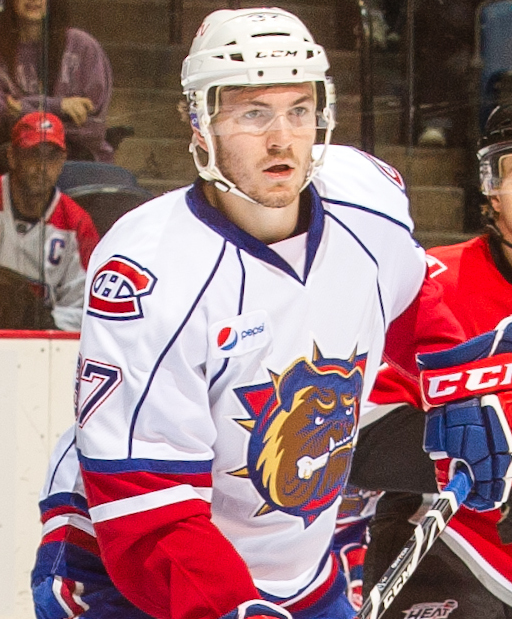
- Holland with the Hamilton Bulldogs in 2013
- Born: January 7, 1992 (age 34) Lethbridge, Alberta, Canada
- Height: 6 ft 0 in (183 cm)
- Weight: 175 lb (79 kg; 12 st 7 lb)
- Position: Right wing
- Shot: Right
- Played for: Montreal Canadiens; HPK
- NHL draft: 193rd overall, 2010; Calgary Flames
- Playing career: 2012–2016

Patrick Evan Holland (born January 7, 1992) is a Canadian former professional ice hockey player. Holland was selected by the Calgary Flames in the 7th round (193rd overall) of the 2010 NHL entry draft and played 5 games in the National Hockey League (NHL) with the Montreal Canadiens. He concluded his professional career with HPK in the Finnish Liiga.

== Early life ==
Patrick was born in Lethbridge, Alberta on January 7, 1992. He grew up playing in the Lethbridge minor hockey league until he was 15 before playing for the Tri-City Americans in the Western Hockey League.

== Playing career ==
On January 12, 2012, the Calgary Flames traded Holland, along with Rene Bourque and a 2nd round pick at the 2013 NHL entry draft (Zach Fucale), to the Montreal Canadiens in exchange for Mike Cammalleri, Karri Ramo, and a 5th round pick at the 2012 NHL entry draft (Ryan Culkin). On March 7, 2012, the Montreal Canadiens signed Holland to a three-year entry-level contract.

In the opening month of the 2013–14 season, Holland played his first NHL game with the Canadiens against the Edmonton Oilers on October 22, 2013.

On October 5, 2014, Holland and Peter Budaj were traded by the Canadiens to the Winnipeg Jets in return for Eric Tangradi.

After one season within the Jets organization, Holland signed a one-year contract in Finland with Liiga club, HPK, on June 16, 2015. Holland appeared in 20 games with HPK, contributing with 9 points.

Opting to end his professional career, Holland enrolled in the University of Victoria in pursuing a degree in Computer Science. He was later recruited to play for the University's men's ice hockey side, the Vikes, in the British Columbia Intercollegiate Hockey League.

== Career statistics ==
			Regular season					Playoffs
Season	Team	League	GP	G	A	Pts	PIM	GP	G	A	Pts	PIM
2008–09	Tri-City Americans	WHL	1	0	0	0	0	—	—	—	—	—
2009–10	Tri-City Americans	WHL	59	16	20	36	14	22	3	7	10	10
2010–11	Tri-City Americans	WHL	71	22	40	62	24	10	4	4	8	2
2011–12	Tri-City Americans	WHL	72	25	84	109	48	14	6	13	19	22
2012–13	Tri-City Americans	WHL	2	0	1	1	0	—	—	—	—	—
2012–13	Hamilton Bulldogs	AHL	69	10	18	28	8	—	—	—	—	—
2013–14	Hamilton Bulldogs	AHL	57	6	11	17	2	—	—	—	—	—
2013–14	Montreal Canadiens	NHL	5	0	0	0	0	—	—	—	—	—
2014–15	St. John's IceCaps	AHL	21	0	2	2	6	—	—	—	—	—
2014–15	Ontario Reign	ECHL	4	1	3	4	0	—	—	—	—	—
2015–16	HPK	Liiga	20	4	5	9	8	—	—	—	—	—
2016–17	University of Victoria	BCIHL	24	14	14	28	10	5	4	7	11	2
2017–18	University of Victoria	BCIHL	4	2	1	3	2	—	—	—	—	—
NHL totals			5	0	0	0	0	—	—	—	—	—
