= Rene Bourque =

Canadian ice hockey player (born 1981)

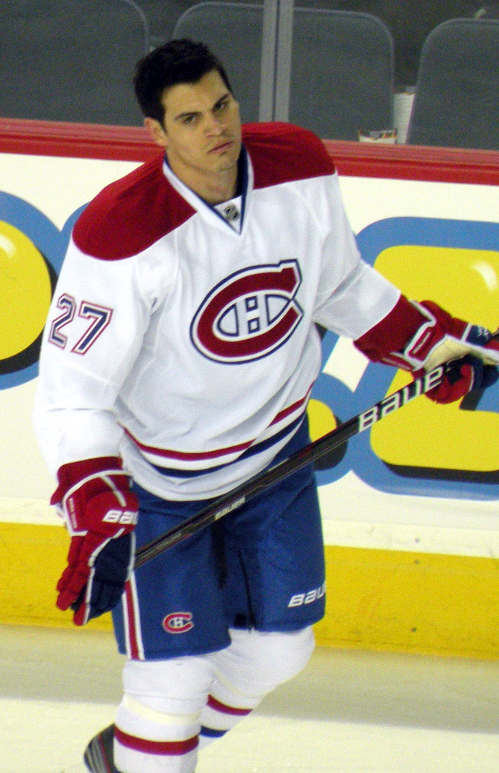
- Bourque with the Montreal Canadiens in 2012
- Born: December 10, 1981 (age 44) Lac La Biche, Alberta, Canada
- Height: 6 ft 2 in (188 cm)
- Weight: 217 lb (98 kg; 15 st 7 lb)
- Position: Right wing
- Shot: Left
- Played for: Chicago Blackhawks; Calgary Flames; Montreal Canadiens; Anaheim Ducks; Columbus Blue Jackets; Colorado Avalanche; Djurgårdens IF
- National team: Canada
- NHL draft: Undrafted
- Playing career: 2004–2018

Rene Gary Wayne Bourque (born December 10, 1981) is a Canadian former professional ice hockey player who was a right winger in the National Hockey League (NHL). An undrafted player, Bourque was signed by the Chicago Blackhawks as a free agent in 2004 and made his NHL debut in 2005–06. He spent three years in Chicago before a 2008 trade sent him to the Calgary Flames where he established himself as a key offensive player. He was traded to the Montreal Canadiens before stints with the Anaheim Ducks, Columbus Blue Jackets and Colorado Avalanche.

Bourque is a graduate of the University of Wisconsin, where he played four seasons of hockey and served as a co-captain in his senior year. He turned professional in 2004 when he joined the Norfolk Admirals of the American Hockey League (AHL). He won the Dudley "Red" Garrett Memorial Award as the league's rookie of the year in 2004–05 before beginning his NHL career. Bourque has played for the Canadian national team at the 2010 IIHF World Championship and the 2018 Winter Olympics.

Of Métis heritage, Bourque has initiated several charitable causes dedicated to encouraging Indigenous children and helping youth from rural Northern Alberta afford the cost of playing hockey. His efforts have led to a major increase in sport participation among Indigenous children.

== Early life ==
Bourque was born December 10, 1981, and spent his early childhood in Edmonton. His father, Gary, works in the Canadian oil patch near Fort McMurray, while his mother, Barbara, is a social worker in Lac La Biche. Bourque has a fraternal twin sister, Chantal, and two elder sisters, Kim and Nadia, who are also fraternal twins. He is of Métis heritage, and his first cousin, Wayne Bourque, is a three-time North American native boxing champion.

The family returned to Lac La Biche when Bourque was seven. As his father was sometimes away from home for weeks at a time due to his job, Bourque's mother raised the kids while also studying for her diploma in social work and later working full-time for the Alberta Government. He grew up in a community with many Metis children. His parents encouraged him in hockey, and after a season of minor hockey in Fort McMurray, he attended the Athol Murray College of Notre Dame south of Regina, Saskatchewan, where he was an honours student. He was recruited to play major junior hockey for the Saskatoon Blades of the Western Hockey League (WHL), though he declined to join the Blades as it would have cost him his eligibility to play for a National Collegiate Athletic Association school. Bourque felt that his education was paramount, and it wasn't until he had earned a full scholarship to play at the University of Wisconsin–Madison that he believed he could make a career in hockey. At Wisconsin, he earned a degree in Consumer Behaviour and Business.

== Playing career ==
=== Junior, college and minor-professional ===
Instead of the WHL, Bourque opted to play one season of Junior A hockey with the St. Albert Saints of the Alberta Junior Hockey League (AJHL), retaining his NCAA eligibility. He scored 44 goals and 81 points to finish second in team scoring in 1999–2000. He was named to the AJHL All-Rookie team and finished as a runner-up for the rookie of the year award. In spite of this, he went undrafted by any National Hockey League (NHL) team.

Bourque then moved onto the college game, playing four seasons with the Wisconsin Badgers. He led the Badgers in goals (19) and points (27) as a junior in 2002–03 and was named the team's most valuable player. He again led the Badgers in scoring with 16 goals and 34 points in 2003–04 as Wisconsin reached the regional final of the 2004 NCAA Division I Men's Ice Hockey Tournament. He was named the recipient of the Ivan B. Williamson Scholastic Award as the team's scholastic player of the year. He served as a tri-captain of the team in his final year and reached a double-digit goal total in each of his four seasons with the Badgers.

Following his graduation, on July 29, 2004, Bourque signed a free agent contract with the Chicago Blackhawks. He was assigned to the Hawks' American Hockey League (AHL) affiliate, the Norfolk Admirals, for the 2004–05 season. He scored a franchise record 33 goals for the Admirals, also leading the team with 60 points, and was named the Dudley "Red" Garrett Memorial Award winner as the AHL's rookie of the year. Additionally, he made the All-Rookie Team and played for Team Canada at the 2005 AHL All-Star Game where he won the hardest shot competition.

=== National Hockey League ===
==== Chicago Blackhawks ====
Bourque joined the Blackhawks to start the 2005–06 season, and scored his first NHL goal against goaltender Jean-Sébastien Giguère in his first game, a 5–3 loss to the Mighty Ducks of Anaheim. He finished his rookie season with 16 goals and 34 points, good for fourth place in team scoring. The Hawks subsequently signed Bourque to a two-year contract extension. He endured an injury-plagued season in 2006–07, appearing in only 44 games and scoring 7 goals. He was rushed to hospital during a November 12, 2006, game against the Columbus Blue Jackets after suffering a deep cut to the neck from Nikolai Zherdev's skate during a scrum in the crease. The Blackhawks announced that he would miss 3–6 weeks following surgery to repair the laceration. Bourque considered himself fortunate that the injury was not worse, stating upon his return to action four weeks later that he might not have survived if the cut was a couple of millimetres deeper.

Just over two weeks after his return, Bourque was again sidelined when he suffered a cracked bone in his ankle on December 31, 2006. He returned to action on February 21, 2007, after missing nearly two months. Injuries again hampered Bourque in 2007–08. He missed time early in the season with a groin pull, then was knocked out of the line-up for a month after breaking his thumb in a November game against the Detroit Red Wings. He remained healthy upon his return, finishing the season with 10 goals and 14 assists in 62 games for Chicago.

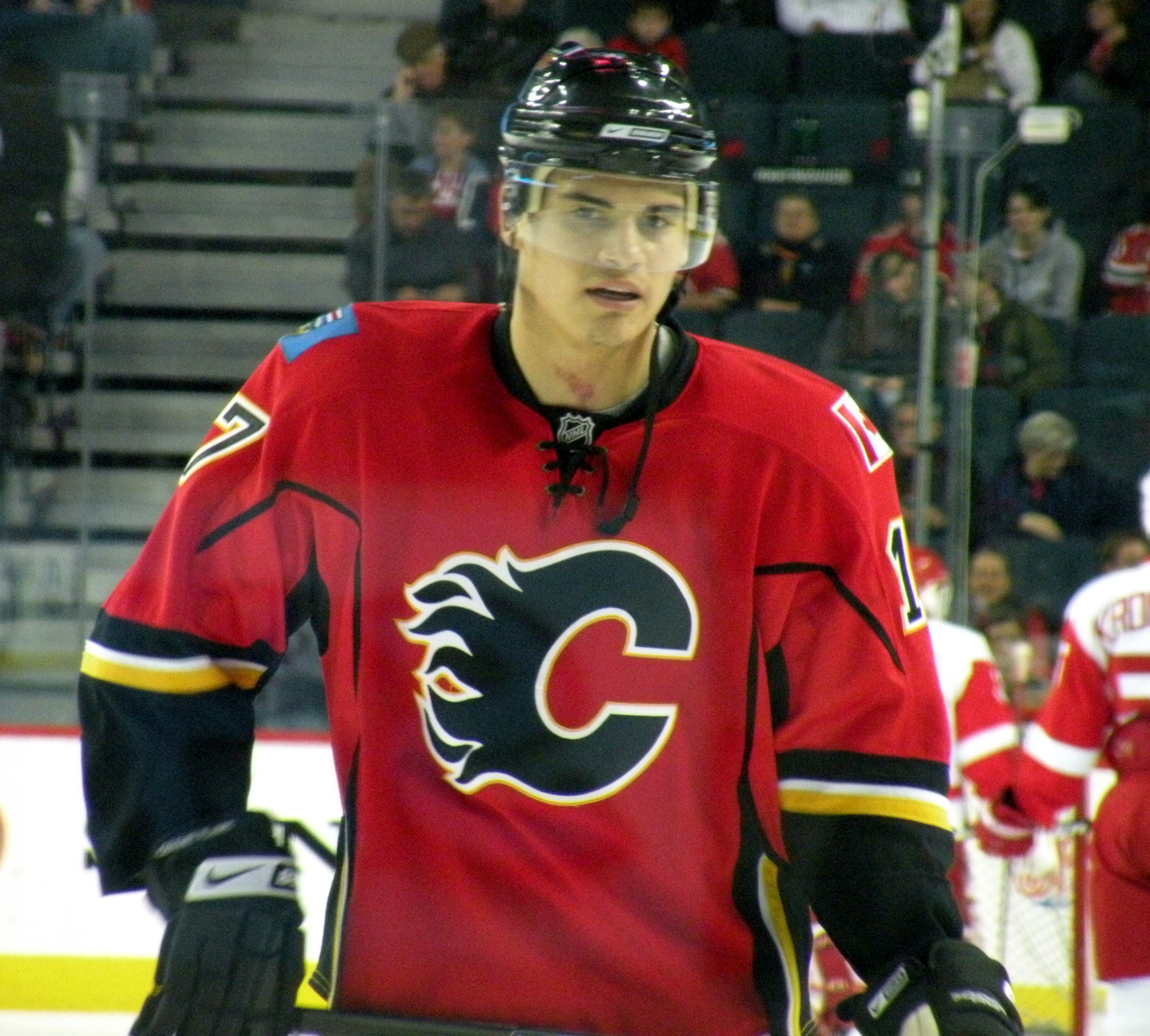
Bourque set career highs of 27 goals and 58 points with the Flames in 2009–10.

==== Calgary Flames ====
On July 1, 2008, Bourque was traded to the Calgary Flames in exchange for a second round selection at the 2009 NHL entry draft. The Flames quickly signed the restricted free agent to a two-year contract. He enjoyed a career year in Calgary that included his first hat trick, against the Ottawa Senators, on December 27, 2008. He suffered a high ankle sprain that sidelined him for the final two months of the regular season. Although he was limited to 58 games, he topped the 20-goal plateau for the first time (21) and scored a career high 40 points. He returned in time to play in the 2009 Stanley Cup Playoffs against the Blackhawks, though he missed one game in the series after re-aggravating the injury. Following the season, he opted for surgery to repair the damage to his ankle.

Bourque continued to provide offence for the Flames early in 2009–10; he was leading the Flames in scoring in late November when he was again knocked out of the line-up by an undisclosed injury. He returned to action after two weeks, having missed six games. Bourque remained an offensive catalyst throughout the season, amassing a new career high in goals (27), assists (31) and points (58), and a +7 rating.

Signing him to a six-year contract extension worth $3.3 million per season in February 2010, the Flames looked to Bourque to be a top player for the organization. Though prone to inconsistent play, he was considered one of the Flames' top offensive threats, and a player looked at as potentially succeeding captain Jarome Iginla as the team's scoring leader. He played in the 2011 Heritage Classic, scoring two goals in a 4–0 win over the Montreal Canadiens, and finished the season second on the team with 27 goals.

Bourque was a frequent lightning rod for attention in 2011–12. Following a slow start to his season offensively, Bourque was criticized on national television by Hockey Night in Canada commentator Kelly Hrudey, who questioned the player's dedication and suggested Bourque didn't care about the game. Bourque expressed his offence at Hrudey's comments, while his teammates spoke out in his defence. He was then suspended twice within a month for illegal hits. Borque received a two-game ban on December 19, 2011, for a check from behind against Chicago's Brent Seabrook, and then earned a five-game suspension on January 4, 2012, for an elbow to the head of Washington's Nicklas Bäckström. It was the last game he played with the Flames.

==== Montreal Canadiens ====
Bourque was sent to Montreal with prospect Patrick Holland and a second round draft pick on January 12 in exchange for Michael Cammalleri, Karri Rämö and a fifth round draft pick.

Combined between Calgary and Montreal, Bourque's 18 goals and 24 points were his lowest totals in four seasons. His start to the 2012–13 season was delayed by injury. Bourque suffered an abdominal wall tear during off-season training that required surgery to repair.

On November 9, 2014, goalless and 13 games into the 2014–15 season, Bourque was placed on waivers by the Canadiens after recording 2 assists and a -9. This was the first season of his NHL career where he didn't score a goal. After clearing waivers on November 10, 2014, Bourque was subsequently sent to Montreal's AHL team, the Hamilton Bulldogs.

==== Anaheim Ducks ====
Bourque's tenure with the Canadiens came to an end when he was traded to the Anaheim Ducks in exchange for Bryan Allen on November 20, 2014. Bourque featured in 30 games with the high-flying Ducks, but struggled to regain his scoring touch in producing just 2 goals.

==== Columbus Blue Jackets ====
After clearing waivers upon the trade deadline, Bourque was included in his second trade for the season along with William Karlsson and 2nd-round pick in 2015 to the Columbus Blue Jackets in exchange for James Wisniewski and a third-round selection in 2015. Bourque was then immediately assigned to AHL affiliate, the Springfield Falcons on March 2, 2015. Before appearing with the Falcons, Bourque was recalled to the Blue Jackets as a replacement for injury.

==== Colorado Avalanche ====
At the conclusion of his long-term contract after the 2015–16 season with the Blue Jackets, Bourque went through the off-season as a free agent before agreeing to a professional try-out offer to join the Colorado Avalanche training camp on August 25, 2016. After a successful training camp and pre-season Bourque solidified his position on the roster and extended his NHL career in signing a one-year, one-way deal for the 2016–17 season on October 10, 2016. Bourque experienced a productive start to his Avalanche career, scoring 8 goals in his first 19 games. Bourque later cooled off offensively with the decline of the Avalanche over the course of the season, he still however, finished with a respectable rebound year in compiling 12 goals and 18 points in 65 games.

=== Swedish Hockey League ===
On August 29, 2017, it was announced the Bourque had signed a one-year contract with Djurgårdens IF Hockey of the Swedish Hockey League. At 35 years old, Bourque finished his NHL career after recording 163 goals and 153 assists in 725 games with the Blackhawks, Flames, Canadiens, Ducks, Blue Jackets and Avalanche. In the 2017–18 season, Bourque found early success on Djurgården scoring line recording 13 goals and 22 points in 35 games. After his absence from the team due to his participation at the Olympics, Bourque was later ruled out for the remainder of the season due to the health of his son. He announced that this would be the final season of his professional career.

== International play ==
Medal record

Representing Canada

Ice hockey

Olympic Games
Bronze medal – third place	2018 Pyeongchang	

Following the 2009–10 season, Bourque was invited to make his international debut and play for Team Canada at the 2010 IIHF World Championship. He scored one goal and one assist in seven games for the seventh-place Canadians.

During the 2017–18 season, Bourque was selected to represent Canada at the 2018 Winter Olympics in Pyeongchang, South Korea. Used in an offensive role, he contributed with 3 goals and 4 points in 6 games to help Canada claim the Bronze medal.

== Off the ice ==
Bourque has been involved in many charitable endeavours both in Calgary and Lac La Biche. He says this lifestyle was tough growing up, which is why he started the Bourque Buddies charity to help Metis children have something to look forward to and work towards. “You see the effects of stuff that goes on in small towns or even in reserves and it’s a tough life for a lot of those kids,” Bourque says. He started the Rene Bourque Hockey Fund with the goal of providing hockey equipment to underprivileged kids, and has appeared as a spokesman for Native Americans in sport at youth symposiums. His fund led to the donation of 50 sets of equipment to underprivileged children in Northern Alberta during the 2008–09 season, and over 100 sets in 2010–11. Also in 2010–11, he started a program called "Bourque's Buddies" that rewards kids from the Tsuu T'ina Nation who have made positive contributions in their schools with tickets to Flames games.

== Career statistics ==
=== Regular season and playoffs ===
			Regular season					Playoffs
Season	Team	League	GP	G	A	Pts	PIM	GP	G	A	Pts	PIM
1998–99	Notre Dame Hounds AAA	SMHL	42	19	22	41	84	3	1	0	1	6
1998–99	Notre Dame Hounds	SJHL	5	1	0	1	0	1	0	0	0	0
1999–2000	St. Albert Saints	AJHL	63	44	41	85	113	—	—	—	—	—
2000–01	Wisconsin Badgers	WCHA	32	10	5	15	18	—	—	—	—	—
2001–02	Wisconsin Badgers	WCHA	38	12	7	19	26	—	—	—	—	—
2002–03	Wisconsin Badgers	WCHA	40	19	8	27	54	—	—	—	—	—
2003–04	Wisconsin Badgers	WCHA	42	16	20	36	74	—	—	—	—	—
2004–05	Norfolk Admirals	AHL	78	33	27	60	105	6	1	0	1	8
2005–06	Chicago Blackhawks	NHL	77	16	18	34	56	—	—	—	—	—
2006–07	Chicago Blackhawks	NHL	44	7	10	17	38	—	—	—	—	—
2007–08	Chicago Blackhawks	NHL	62	10	14	24	42	—	—	—	—	—
2008–09	Calgary Flames	NHL	58	21	19	40	70	5	1	0	1	22
2009–10	Calgary Flames	NHL	73	27	31	58	88	—	—	—	—	—
2010–11	Calgary Flames	NHL	80	27	23	50	42	—	—	—	—	—
2011–12	Calgary Flames	NHL	38	13	3	16	41	—	—	—	—	—
2011–12	Montreal Canadiens	NHL	38	5	3	8	27	—	—	—	—	—
2012–13	Montreal Canadiens	NHL	27	7	6	13	32	5	2	1	3	10
2013–14	Montreal Canadiens	NHL	63	9	7	16	32	17	8	3	11	27
2014–15	Montreal Canadiens	NHL	13	0	2	2	6	—	—	—	—	—
2014–15	Hamilton Bulldogs	AHL	4	2	2	4	4	—	—	—	—	—
2014–15	Anaheim Ducks	NHL	30	2	6	8	12	—	—	—	—	—
2014–15	Columbus Blue Jackets	NHL	8	4	0	4	4	—	—	—	—	—
2015–16	Columbus Blue Jackets	NHL	49	3	5	8	38	—	—	—	—	—
2016–17	Colorado Avalanche	NHL	65	12	6	18	56	—	—	—	—	—
2017–18	Djurgårdens IF	SHL	35	13	9	22	34	—	—	—	—	—
NHL totals			725	163	153	316	584	27	11	4	15	59
AHL totals			83	35	29	64	109	6	1	0	1	8
SHL totals			35	13	9	22	34	—	—	—	—	—

=== International ===
Year	Team	Event	Result	GP	G	A	Pts	PIM
2010	Canada	WC	7th	7	1	1	2	14
2018	Canada	OG	3rd place, bronze medalist(s)	6	3	1	4	2
Senior totals				13	4	2	6	16

== Awards and honours ==
Award	Year
Junior
AJHL All-Rookie Team	1999–00
AHL
Dudley "Red" Garrett Memorial Award	2004–05
AHL All-Rookie Team	2004–05
