= 2013 Esso Cup =

Tournament details
- Venue: Bill Copeland Sports Centre in Burnaby, BC
- Dates: April 21–27, 2013
- Teams: 6

Final positions
- Champions: LHFDQ North
- Runners-up: North Bay Ice Boltz
- Third place: Edmonton Thunder

Tournament statistics
- Scoring leader: Valérie Audet

Awards
- MVP: Mikaeli Cavell

The 2013 Esso Cup was Canada's fifth annual national women's midget hockey championship, played April 21–27, 2013 at the Bill Copeland Sports Centre in Burnaby, British Columbia. The LHFDQ North squad captured Quebec's first national title with a victory over Ontario's North Bay Ice Boltz in the gold medal game. The Edmonton Thunder captured a medal for the fourth consecutive year by winning the bronze.

== Teams ==
Result	Team	Region	City
1st place, gold medalist(s)	LHFDQ North	Quebec	Montreal, QC
2nd place, silver medalist(s)	North Bay Ice Boltz	Ontario	North Bay, ON
3rd place, bronze medalist(s)	Edmonton Thunder	Pacific	Edmonton, AB
4	Regina Rebels	Western	Regina, SK
5	Fraser Valley Phantom	Host	Langley, BC
6	Metro Boston Pizza	Atlantic	Halifax Regional Municipality, NS

== Round robin ==
=== Standings ===
Pos	Team	Pld	W	OTW	OTL	L	GF	GA	GD	Pts
1	Edmonton Thunder	5	3	2	0	0	21	13	+8	13
2	Regina Rebels	5	3	0	2	0	17	11	+6	11
3	LHFDQ North	5	3	0	0	2	20	11	+9	9
4	North Bay Ice Boltz	5	2	1	1	1	11	9	+2	9
5	Fraser Valley Phantom	5	1	0	0	4	7	16	−9	3
6	Metro Boston Pizza	5	0	0	0	5	4	20	−16	0

=== Scores ===
- North Bay 3 - Metro 0
- Regina 5 - LHFDQ North 2
- Edmonton 4 - Fraser Valley 2
- North Bay 2 - Regina 1 (SO)
- Edmonton 4 - Metro 1
- LHFDQ North 5 - Fraser Valley 1
- LHFDQ North 8 - Metro 1
- Edmonton 5 - North Bay 4 (SO)
- Regina 5 - Fraser Valley 1
- LHFDQ North 3 - North Bay 1
- Edmonton 5 - Regina 4 (OT)
- Fraser Valley 3 - Metro 1
- LHFDQ North 3 - Edmonton 2
- Regina 2 - Metro 1
- North Bay 1 - Fraser Valley 0

== Playoffs ==
Semifinals
4	North Bay	5
1	Edmonton	1
3	LHFDQ North	6
2	Regina	3

Gold Medal Game
4	North Bay	2
3	LHFDQ North	5
Bronze Medal Game
2	Regina	0
1	Edmonton	1

== Individual awards ==
- Most Valuable Player: Mikaeli Cavell (Edmonton)
- Top Scorer: Valérie Audet (LHFDQ North)
- Top Forward: Jade Downie-Landry (LHFDQ North)
- Top Defenceman: Corie Jacobson (North Bay)
- Top Goaltender: Sabrina Picard (North Bay)
- Most Sportsmanlike Player: Jodie Gentile (Fraser Valley)

== Road to the Esso Cup ==
=== Atlantic Region ===
Tournament held April 4 – 7 at the Pictou Wellness Center in Pictou, Nova Scotia.

Round Robin
Pos	Team	Pld	W	L	D	GF	GA	GD	Pts
1	Metro	4	3	0	1	22	3	+19	7
2	Moncton Rockets	4	3	1	0	15	4	+11	6
3	Capital District Cyclones	4	2	1	1	18	8	+10	5
4	Northern Storm (Host)	4	1	3	0	6	16	−10	2
5	Central Ice Pak	4	0	4	0	3	33	−30	0

Final
Moncton	1
Metro	2

Metro advances to Esso Cup

=== Quebec ===
Dodge Cup played April 4 – 5, 2013 at Boucherville, Québec.

Semifinals
1	West	3
4	South	2
3	East	1
2	North	2

Final
East	1
North	2

LHFDQ North advances to Esso Cup.

=== Ontario ===
Ontario Women's Hockey Association Championship played April 4 – 7, 2013 at Ottawa, Ontario.

Quarterfinals
Whitby	1
Saugeen-Maitland	2
Thunder Bay	3
Sault Ste. Marie	1
Toronto	0
Nepean	3
North Bay	4
Bluewater	1

Semifinals
Saugeen-Maitland	1
Thunder Bay	2
Nepean	0
North Bay	1

Final
Thunder Bay	2
North Bay	3

North Bay advances to Esso Cup.

=== Western Region ===
Best-of-3 series played April 5 – 7, 2013 in Morden, Manitoba

Best-of-3 series
Pos	Team	Pld	W	L	GF	GA	GD
1	Regina Rebels	2	2	0	5	3	+2
2	Pembina Valley Hawks	2	0	2	3	5	−2

Regina advances to Esso Cup.

=== Pacific Region ===
Fraser Valley Phantom vs Edmonton Thunder.

Edmonton automatically qualifies for Esso Cup as Fraser Valley is host team.

Pacific champion determined by 2013 Esso Cup round robin match on April 21, 2013.

== See also ==
- Esso Cup
