= British Columbia Intercollegiate Hockey League =

University ice hockey league

- Sport: Ice hockey
- Founded: 2006
- First season: 2006–07
- No. of teams: 5
- Country: Canada
- Headquarters: Burnaby, British Columbia
- Most recent champion: Vancouver Island University
- Most titles: Simon Fraser University (5)
- Website: bcihl.ca

The British Columbia Intercollegiate Hockey League (BCIHL) is a university ice hockey league based in British Columbia. The BCIHL was created with the purpose of offering a venue for competitive, high-calibre hockey for players beyond their junior hockey careers. Teams play a 24-game regular season schedule, with the top four teams qualifying for the playoffs consisting of a best-of-three semifinal round, and a best-of-three championship series. Prior to 2012 the championship had been decided through a round-robin tournament.

The league operates as one of two Division 2 leagues in Canada when compared to the Division 1 U Sports league, the other being Alberta's ACAC. BCIHL teams, however, regularly play U Sports and NCAA teams.

== History ==
In 2011, the BCIHL accepted its first US-based team in Eastern Washington University, which had previously played in the American Collegiate Hockey Association at the Division II level. Before 2011, the BCIHL consisted entirely of teams from British Columbia.

The 2016–17 season would see the BCIHL get its first NHL alumni as former Montreal Canadiens forward Patrick Holland would join the University of Victoria.

Vancouver Island University was confirmed as the sixth team to join the BCIHL in 2017, and joined the league for the 2017/2018 season.

In 2019, Trinity Western University's men's and women's hockey programs were officially accepted into the Canada West Universities Athletic Association starting in the 2020-21 season. The Spartans would finish their final season in the BCIHL as regular season champions.

In March 2021, Selkirk College announced it would be discontinuing the Saints men's hockey program due to budget constraints as a result of the COVID-19 pandemic. This departure marked the first time a former BCIHL Champion has dissolved.

On June 22, 2021, the Okanagan Lakers were added to the BCIHL via expansion and became the league's first independent club, consisting of student-athletes from both the University of British Columbia-Okanagan and Okanagan College.

On February 8, 2022, the Logan Lake Miners were added to the BCIHL via expansion, consisting of student-athletes from Thompson Rivers University in Kamloops and the Nicola Valley Institute of Technology in Merritt. The team plays out of the Logan Lake Recreation Centre.

After the end of the 2025-26 season, SFU shuttered its traveling exhibition team, and there were rumors that the BCIHL team would follow. These rumors were unfounded, as SFU continues to field a team in the league.

Prior to the 2026-27 season, the BCIHL announced that the Logan Lake Miners would change their name to the Thompson Rivers Wolfpack, the same name used by Thompson Rivers University's varsity teams.

A new women's division was created for the 2026-27. In its first year, it will only play exhibition games, and consists of 3 teams, VIU, TRU and the Okanagan Lakers. Three exhibition tournaments are planned, in Logan Lake and Kelowna.

== Teams ==
Institution	Team Name	Location	Joined BCIHL	Championships	Championship years	Website
Simon Fraser University	SFU Red Leafs	Burnaby, British Columbia	2006	5	2008, 2010, 2011, 2022, 2023	sfuhockey.com
University of Victoria	UVic Vikes	Victoria, British Columbia	2006	5	2007, 2009, 2012, 2017, 2025	vikeshockey.com
Vancouver Island University	VIU Mariners	Nanaimo, British Columbia	2017	2	2024, 2026	https://www.viuhockey.ca/
University of British Columbia-Okanagan / Okanagan College	Okanagan Lakers	Kelowna, British Columbia	2021	0		okanaganlakers.com
Thompson Rivers University / Nicola Valley Institute of Technology	Thompson Rivers Wolfpack	Logan Lake, British Columbia	2022	0		https://www.loganlakeminers.com/

=== Former teams ===
Institution	Location	Championships	Joined BCIHL	Year Left
Selkirk College	Castlegar, British Columbia	4 (2013, 2014, 2015, 2016)	2007	2021
Trinity Western University	Langley, British Columbia	2 (2018, 2019)	2006	2020
Eastern Washington University	(Washington (state)) Cheney, Washington	0	2011	2018
University of the Fraser Valley	Abbotsford, British Columbia	0	2006	2011
University of Northern British Columbia	Prince George, British Columbia	0	2006	2007
Okanagan College	Kelowna, British Columbia	0	2009	2012
Thompson Rivers University	Kamloops, British Columbia	0	2009	2014

== Championships ==
The championship results for each season are listed below.

Year	Champion	Runner-Up	Result
2006–07	University of Victoria	Simon Fraser University	4-0 (round robin)
2007–08	Simon Fraser University	University of the Fraser Valley	3-1 (round robin)
2008–09	University of Victoria	Simon Fraser University	3-1 (round robin)
2009–10	Simon Fraser University	Thompson Rivers University	3-1 (round robin)
2010–11	Simon Fraser University	Thompson Rivers University	3-1 (round robin)
2011–12	University of Victoria	Simon Fraser University	4-0 (round robin)
2012–13	Selkirk College	Simon Fraser University	2-0 (best-of-3)
2013–14	Selkirk College	Trinity Western University	2-0 (best-of-3)
2014–15	Selkirk College	Simon Fraser University	2-0 (best-of-3)
2015–16	Selkirk College	Trinity Western University	2-0 (best-of-3)
2016–17	University of Victoria	Trinity Western University	2-1 (best-of-3)
2017–18	Trinity Western University	Selkirk College	2-0 (best-of-3)
2018–19	Trinity Western University	Vancouver Island University	2-0 (best-of-3)
2019–20	Playoffs cancelled due to the COVID-19 pandemic.		
2020–21	Season cancelled due to the COVID-19 pandemic.		
2021–22	Simon Fraser University	Vancouver Island University	2-0 (championship tournament)
2022–23	Simon Fraser University	Vancouver Island University	2-0 (best-of-3)
2023–24	Vancouver Island University	University of Victoria	2-0 (best-of-3)
2024–25	University of Victoria	Vancouver Island University	3–0 (single game)
2025–26	Vancouver Island University	University of Victoria	8–1 (single game)

== Notable players ==
- Patrick Holland - Montreal Canadiens
- Jordan Wood - Huntsville Havoc
- Anthony Collins - Rapid City Rush
- James Isaacs - Fife Flyers
- Elijah Vilio - Atlanta Gladiators, Rapid City Rush, Norfolk Admirals (ECHL), Savannah Ghost Pirates
