= 2015 World Junior Ice Hockey Championships rosters =

Below are the rosters for teams competing in the 2015 World Junior Ice Hockey Championships.

== Group A ==
=== Canada ===
- Head coach: (Canada) Benoit Groulx

Pos.	No.	Player	Team	NHL Rights
GK	1	Eric Comrie	(United States) Tri-City Americans	Winnipeg Jets
GK	31	Zach Fucale	(Canada) Halifax Mooseheads	Montreal Canadiens
D	2	Joe Hicketts	(Canada) Victoria Royals	Detroit Red Wings
D	3	Dillon Heatherington	(Canada) Swift Current Broncos	Columbus Blue Jackets
D	4	Madison Bowey	(Canada) Kelowna Rockets	Washington Capitals
D	5	Samuel Morin	(Canada) Rimouski Océanic	Philadelphia Flyers
D	6	Shea Theodore	(United States) Seattle Thunderbirds	Anaheim Ducks
D	7	Josh Morrissey	(Canada) Kelowna Rockets	Winnipeg Jets
D	25	Darnell Nurse	(Canada) Sault Ste. Marie Greyhounds	Edmonton Oilers
F	9	Brayden Point	(Canada) Moose Jaw Warriors	Tampa Bay Lightning
F	10	Anthony Duclair	(Canada) Quebec Remparts	New York Rangers
F	16	Max Domi	(Canada) London Knights	Arizona Coyotes
F	17	Connor McDavid	(United States) Erie Otters	Draft-Eligible 2015
F	18	Jake Virtanen	(Canada) Calgary Hitmen	Vancouver Canucks
F	19	Nic Petan	(United States) Portland Winterhawks	Winnipeg Jets
F	20	Nick Paul	(Canada) North Bay Battalion	Ottawa Senators
F	21	Nick Ritchie	(Canada) Peterborough Petes	Anaheim Ducks
F	22	Frédérik Gauthier	(Canada) Rimouski Océanic	Toronto Maple Leafs
F	23	Sam Reinhart	(Canada) Kootenay Ice	Buffalo Sabres
F	26	Curtis Lazar	(Canada) Ottawa Senators	Ottawa Senators
F	28	Lawson Crouse	(Canada) Kingston Frontenacs	Draft-Eligible 2015
F	29	Robby Fabbri	(Canada) Guelph Storm	St. Louis Blues

=== Germany ===
- Head coach: (Canada) (Italy) Pat Cortina

Pos.	No.	Player	Team	NHL Rights
GK	1	Ilya Sharipov	(Austria) EC Salzburg	Undrafted
GK	29	Florian Proske	(Germany) Heilbronn Falcons	Undrafted
GK	30	Kevin Reich	(United States) Green Bay Gamblers	Undrafted
D	3	Tim Bender	(Germany) EHC Red Bull München	Undrafted
D	4	Jonas Müller	(Germany) Eisbären Berlin	Undrafted
D	5	David Trinkenberger	(United States) Muskegon Lumberjacks	Undrafted
D	7	Dorian Saeftel	(Germany) Heilbronn Falcons	Undrafted
D	9	Patrick Kurz	(Germany) Ravensburg Towerstars	Undrafted
D	12	Kai Wissmann	(Germany) FASS Berlin	Draft-Eligible 2015
D	16	Fabio Wagner	(Germany) ERC Ingolstadt	Undrafted
D	18	Janik Moser	(United States) Ohio State University	Undrafted
F	6	Parker Tuomie	(United States) Sioux Falls Stampede	Undrafted
F	10	Marc Michaelis	(United States) Green Bay Gamblers	Undrafted
F	11	Markus Eisenschmid	(Canada) Medicine Hat Tigers	Undrafted
F	14	Manuel Wiederer	(Germany) ESF Kaufbeuren	Draft-Eligible 2015
F	17	Frederik Tiffels	(United States) Western Michigan University	Undrafted
F	19	Nico Sturm	(United States) Austin Bruins	Undrafted
F	21	Dominik Kahun	(Germany) EHC Red Bull München	Undrafted
F	22	Marc Schmidpeter	(Germany) ERC Ingolstadt	Undrafted
F	23	Vladislav Filin	(Austria) EC Red Bull Salzburg	Undrafted
F	25	Fabio Pfohl	(Germany) Kölner Haie	Undrafted
F	27	Maximilian Kammerer	(Austria) EC Red Bull Salzburg	Draft-Eligible 2015
F	28	Andreas Eder	(Austria) EC Red Bull Salzburg	Undrafted

=== Finland ===
- Head coach: (Finland) Hannu Jortikka

Pos.	No.	Player	Team	NHL Rights
GK	30	Ville Husso	(Finland) HIFK	St. Louis Blues
GK	31	Juuse Saros	(Finland) HPK	Nashville Predators
D	2	Sami Niku	(Finland) JYP Jyväskylä	Draft-Eligible 2015
D	4	Mika Ilvonen	(United States) St. Cloud State Huskies	Undrafted
D	5	Aleksi Mäkelä	(Finland) Ilves	Dallas Stars
D	6	Joonas Lyytinen	(Finland) KalPa	Nashville Predators
D	7	Atte Mäkinen	(Finland) Tappara	Undrafted
D	9	Julius Honka	(United States) Texas Stars	Dallas Stars
D	23	Alex Lintuniemi	(Canada) Ottawa 67's	Los Angeles Kings
F	10	Juuso Ikonen	(Finland) JYP Jyväskylä	Undrafted
F	11	Hannes Björninen	(Finland) Lahti Pelicans	Undrafted
F	13	Jesse Puljujärvi	(Finland) Oulun Kärpät	Draft-Eligible 2016
F	16	Mikko Rantanen	(Finland) HC TPS	Draft-Eligible 2015
F	19	Antti Kalapudas	(Finland) Oulun Kärpät	Undrafted
F	20	Niko Ojamäki	(Finland) Ässät	Undrafted
F	21	Aleksi Mustonen	(Finland) Ilves	Undrafted
F	22	Roope Hintz	(Finland) Ilves	Draft-Eligible 2015
F	24	Kasperi Kapanen	(Finland) KalPa	Pittsburgh Penguins
F	26	Sebastian Aho	(Finland) Oulun Kärpät	Draft-Eligible 2015
F	27	Julius Vähätalo	(Finland) HC TPS	Detroit Red Wings
F	28	Artturi Lehkonen	(Sweden) Frölunda HC	Montreal Canadiens
F	29	Otto Rauhala	(Finland) Tappara	Undrafted

=== Slovakia ===
- Head coach: (Slovakia) Ernest Bokroš

Pos.	No.	Player	Team	NHL Rights
GK	1	Daniel Gibl	(Canada) Barrie Colts	Undrafted
GK	2	Dávid Okoličány	(Slovakia) HK Orange 20	Undrafted
GK	30	Denis Godla	(Slovakia) HK Orange 20	Undrafted
D	4	Mislav Rosandić	(Slovakia) HC ’05 Banská Bystrica	Undrafted
D	5	Marco Hochel	(Slovakia) HK Orange 20	Undrafted
D	7	Dominik Jendroľ	(Slovakia) HK Orange 20	Undrafted
D	11	Matúš Holenda	(Slovakia) HK Orange 20	Undrafted
D	14	Erik Černák	(Slovakia) HC Košice	Draft-Eligible 2015
D	15	Patrik Bačík	(Slovakia) HK Orange 20	Undrafted
D	18	Branislav Pavúk	(Slovakia) HK Orange 20	Undrafted
D	26	Christián Jaroš	(Sweden) Luleå HF	Draft-Eligible 2015
F	8	Patrik Koyš	(Slovakia) HK Orange 20	Undrafted
F	9	Samuel Petráš	(Slovakia) HK Orange 20	Undrafted
F	10	Martin Réway	(Czech Republic) Sparta Prague	Montreal Canadiens
F	12	Dominik Rehák	(Slovakia) HK Orange 20	Undrafted
F	13	Radovan Bondra	(Slovakia) HK Orange 20	Draft-Eligible 2015
F	16	Róbert Lantoši	(Sweden) VIK Västerås HK	Undrafted
F	19	Matúš Sukeľ	(Slovakia) HK Orange 20	Undrafted
F	21	Dávid Šoltés	(Canada) Prince George Cougars	Undrafted
F	22	Peter Cehlárik	(Sweden) Luleå HF	Boston Bruins
F	27	Michal Kabáč	(Slovakia) HK Orange 20	Undrafted
F	28	Pavol Skalický	(Slovakia) HK Orange 20	Undrafted
F	29	Matej Paulovič	(United States) Muskegon Lumberjacks	Dallas Stars

=== United States ===
- Head coach: (United States) Mark Osiecki

Pos.	No.	Player	Team	NHL Rights
GK	29	Brandon Halverson	(Canada) Sault Ste. Marie Greyhounds	New York Rangers
GK	30	Thatcher Demko	(United States) Boston College	Vancouver Canucks
GK	31	Alex Nedeljkovic	(United States) Plymouth Whalers	Carolina Hurricanes
D	2	Noah Hanifin	(United States) Boston College	Draft-Eligible 2015
D	3	Ian McCoshen	(United States) Boston College	Florida Panthers
D	4	Will Butcher	(United States) University of Denver	Colorado Avalanche
D	6	Ryan Collins	(United States) University of Minnesota	Columbus Blue Jackets
D	23	Zach Werenski	(United States) University of Michigan	Draft-Eligible 2015
D	24	Tony DeAngelo	(Canada) Sarnia Sting	Tampa Bay Lightning
D	26	Brandon Carlo	(United States) Tri-City Americans	Draft-Eligible 2015
F	7	J. T. Compher	(United States) University of Michigan	Buffalo Sabres
F	8	Nick Schmaltz	(United States) University of North Dakota	Chicago Blackhawks
F	9	Jack Eichel	(United States) Boston University	Draft-Eligible 2015
F	10	Anthony Louis	(United States) Miami University	Chicago Blackhawks
F	11	Miles Wood	(United States) Noble and Greenough School	New Jersey Devils
F	13	Sonny Milano	(United States) Plymouth Whalers	Columbus Blue Jackets
F	14	Tyler Motte	(United States) University of Michigan	Chicago Blackhawks
F	15	John Hayden	(United States) Yale University	Chicago Blackhawks
F	17	Alex Tuch	(United States) Boston College	Minnesota Wild
F	18	Chase De Leo	(United States) Portland Winterhawks	Winnipeg Jets
F	21	Dylan Larkin	(United States) University of Michigan	Detroit Red Wings
F	22	Hudson Fasching	(United States) University of Minnesota	Buffalo Sabres
F	34	Auston Matthews	(United States) U.S. NTDP	Draft-Eligible 2016

== Group B ==
=== Czech Republic ===
- Head coach: (Czech Republic) Miroslav Přerost

Pos.	No.	Player	Team	NHL Rights
GK	1	Miroslav Svoboda	(Czech Republic) Oceláři Třinec	Undrafted
GK	2	Vítek Vaněček	(Czech Republic) Bílí Tygři Liberec	Washington Capitals
GK	30	Daniel Vladař	(Czech Republic) HC Kladno	Draft-Eligible 2015
D	3	Jan Košťálek	(Canada) Rimouski Océanic	Winnipeg Jets
D	4	Jan Ščotka	(Czech Republic) HC ČSOB Pojišťovna Pardubice	Undrafted
D	5	Marek Baránek	(Czech Republic) HC Litvínov	Undrafted
D	6	Lukáš Klok	(Czech Republic) Vítkovice Steel	Undrafted
D	8	David Němeček	(Finland) HC TPS	Undrafted
D	20	Jan Štencel	(Czech Republic) Vítkovice Steel	Undrafted
D	27	Dominik Mašín	(Canada) Peterborough Petes	Tampa Bay Lightning
F	9	David Pastrňák	(United States) Boston Bruins	Boston Bruins
F	10	David Kämpf	(Czech Republic) Piráti Chomutov	Undrafted
F	13	Jakub Vrána	(Sweden) Linköpings HC	Washington Capitals
F	14	Pavel Zacha	(Canada) Sarnia Sting	Draft-Eligible 2015
F	16	Jan Mandát	(Canada) Val-d'Or Foreurs	Undrafted
F	17	Marek Růžička	(Czech Republic) Oceláři Třinec	Undrafted
F	18	Dominik Kubalík	(Czech Republic) HC Plzeň	Los Angeles Kings
F	21	Michael Špaček	(Czech Republic) HC ČSOB Pojišťovna Pardubice	Draft-Eligible 2015
F	23	David Kaše	(Czech Republic) Piráti Chomutov	Draft-Eligible 2015
F	25	Ondřej Kaše	(Czech Republic) Piráti Chomutov	Anaheim Ducks
F	26	Patrik Zdráhal	(Czech Republic) Vítkovice Steel	Undrafted
F	28	Sebastian Gorčík	(Czech Republic) HC Karlovy Vary	Undrafted

=== Denmark ===
- Head coach: (Denmark) Olaf Eller

Pos.	No.	Player	Team	NHL Rights
GK	1	Nicolaj Henriksen	(Denmark) Esbjerg Energy	undrafted
GK	31	Thomas Lillie	(Sweden) Växjö Lakers	undrafted
GK	39	Georg Sørensen	(Denmark) Herning Blue Fox	undrafted
D	2	Anders Krogsgaard	(Denmark) Esbjerg Energy	undrafted
D	3	Daniel Hansen	(Denmark) SønderjyskE	undrafted
D	5	Matthias Lassen	(Denmark) Rødovre Mighty Bulls	undrafted
D	6	Daniel Nielsen	(Denmark) Hvidovre IK	undrafted
D	11	Mads Larsen	(Sweden) Malmö Redhawks	undrafted
D	14	Victor Eskerod	(Denmark) Gentofte Stars	undrafted
D	18	Sonny Hertzberg	(Canada) Oshawa Generals	undrafted
F	7	Mikkel Aagaard	(Canada) Niagara IceDogs	undrafted
F	9	Nick Olesen	(Denmark) Odense Bulldogs	undrafted
F	10	Kristian Jensen	(Sweden) Luleå HF	undrafted
F	15	Andre Pison	(United States) Wenatchee Wild	undrafted
F	16	Alexander True	(United States) Seattle Thunderbirds	Draft-Eligible 2015
F	17	Marcus Nielsen	(Denmark) Rungsted IK	undrafted
F	19	Emil Rasmussen	(Denmark) Rødovre Mighty Bulls	undrafted
F	20	Mads Eller	(Canada) Edmonton Oil Kings	undrafted
F	21	Mathias Asperup	(Sweden) Malmö Redhawks	undrafted
F	23	Jeppe Holmberg	(Denmark) Esbjerg Energy	undrafted
F	24	Nikolaj Ehlers	(Canada) Halifax Mooseheads	Winnipeg Jets
F	27	Oliver Bjorkstrand	(United States) Portland Winterhawks	Columbus Blue Jackets
F	28	Søren Nielsen	(Denmark) Esbjerg Energy	Draft-Eligible 2015

=== Russia ===
- Head coach: (Russia) Valeri Bragin

Pos.	No.	Player	Team	NHL Rights
GK	1	Ilya Sorokin	(Russia) Metallurg Novokuznetsk	New York Islanders
GK	29	Denis Kostin	(Russia) Avangard Omsk	Undrafted
GK	30	Igor Shestyorkin	(Russia) SKA Saint Petersburg	New York Rangers
D	3	Dmitri Yudin	(Russia) SKA Saint Petersburg	Undrafted
D	4	Ziat Paigin	(Russia) Ak Bars Kazan	Undrafted
D	5	Nikita Cherepanov	(Russia) HC Ryazan	Draft-Eligible 2015
D	6	Vladislav Gavrikov	(Russia) HC Ryazan	Draft-Eligible 2015
D	7	Rushan Rafikov	(Russia) HC Ryazan	Calgary Flames
D	12	Alexander Bryntsev	(Russia) Neftekhimik Nizhnekamsk	Draft-Eligible 2015
D	24	Rinat Valiev	(Canada) Kootenay Ice	Toronto Maple Leafs
D	29	Ivan Provorov	(Canada) Brandon Wheat Kings	Draft-Eligible 2015
F	9	Vladislav Kamenev	(Russia) Metallurg Magnitogorsk	Nashville Predators
F	11	Nikolay Goldobin	(Finland) HIFK	San Jose Sharks
F	15	Anatoly Golyshev	(Russia) Avtomobilist Yekaterinburg	Draft-Eligible 2015
F	17	Ivan Fishenko	(Russia) Sokol Krasnoyarsk	Draft-Eligible 2015
F	18	Maxim Mamin	(Russia) CSKA Moscow	Draft-Eligible 2015
F	19	Pavel Buchnevich	(Russia) Severstal Cherepovets	New York Rangers
F	22	Ivan Barbashev	(Canada) Moncton Wildcats	St. Louis Blues
F	23	Alexander Sharov	(Russia) Lada Togliatti	Draft-Eligible 2015
F	25	Alexander Dergachyov	(Russia) SKA Saint Petersburg	Draft-Eligible 2015
F	26	Vladimir Bryukvin	(Russia) Dynamo Moscow	Draft-Eligible 2015
F	27	Vyacheslav Leshenko	(Russia) Atlant Mytishchi	Draft-Eligible 2015
F	28	Sergei Tolchinsky	(Canada) Sault Ste. Marie Greyhounds	Carolina Hurricanes

=== Sweden ===
- Head coach: (Sweden) Rikard Grönborg

Pos.	No.	Player	Team	NHL Rights
GK	1	Samuel Ward	(Sweden) Luleå HF	Undrafted
GK	30	Linus Söderström	(Sweden) Djurgårdens IF	New York Islanders
GK	35	Fredrik Bergvik	(Sweden) Frölunda HC	San Jose Sharks
D	2	Sebastian Aho	(Sweden) Skellefteå AIK	Draft-Eligible 2015
D	3	William Lagesson	(United States) Dubuque Fighting Saints	Edmonton Oilers
D	5	Robin Norell	(Sweden) Djurgårdens IF	Chicago Blackhawks
D	6	Andreas Englund	(Sweden) Djurgårdens IF	Ottawa Senators
D	7	Julius Bergman	(Canada) London Knights	San Jose Sharks
D	8	Gustav Forsling	(Sweden) Linköpings HC	Vancouver Canucks
D	14	Robert Hägg	(United States) Lehigh Valley Phantoms	Philadelphia Flyers
F	9	Jacob de la Rose	(Canada) Hamilton Bulldogs	Montreal Canadiens
F	11	Anton Blidh	(Sweden) Frölunda HC	Boston Bruins
F	12	Victor Olofsson	(Sweden) Modo Hockey	Buffalo Sabres
F	20	Adam Brodecki	(Sweden) Brynäs IF	Undrafted
F	21	William Nylander	(Sweden) Modo Hockey	Toronto Maple Leafs
F	22	Oskar Lindblom	(Sweden) Brynäs IF	Philadelphia Flyers
F	23	Lucas Wallmark	(Sweden) Luleå HF	Carolina Hurricanes
F	24	Jens Lööke	(Sweden) Brynäs IF	Draft-Eligible 2015
F	25	Axel Holmström	(Sweden) Skellefteå AIK	Detroit Red Wings
F	26	Christoffer Ehn	(Sweden) Frölunda HC	Detroit Red Wings
F	27	Anton Karlsson	(Sweden) Frölunda HC	Arizona Coyotes
F	28	Leon Bristedt	(United States) University of Minnesota	Undrafted
F	29	Adrian Kempe	(Sweden) Modo Hockey	Los Angeles Kings

=== Switzerland ===
- Head coach: (Switzerland) (Canada) John Fust

Pos.	No.	Player	Team	NHL Rights
GK	1	Ludovic Waeber	(Switzerland) HC Fribourg-Gottéron	undrafted
GK	29	Gauthier Descloux	(Switzerland) Genève-Servette HC	undrafted
GK	30	Gilles Senn	(Switzerland) HC Davos	undrafted
D	2	Michael Fora	(Canada) Kamloops Blazers	undrafted
D	5	Mirco Müller	(United States) San Jose Sharks	San Jose Sharks
D	6	Edson Harlacher	(Switzerland) Kloten Flyers	undrafted
D	14	Phil Baltisberger	(Canada) Guelph Storm	undrafted
D	20	Simon Kindschi	(Switzerland) HC Davos	undrafted
D	25	Jonas Siegenthaler	(Switzerland) ZSC Lions	Draft-Eligible 2015
D	27	Yannick Rathgeb	(Canada) Plymouth Whalers	undrafted
F	9	Michael Hugli	(Switzerland) EV Zug	Draft-Eligible 2015
F	10	Kevin Fiala	(Sweden) HV71	Nashville Predators
F	12	Jason Fuchs	(Switzerland) HC Ambrì-Piotta	undrafted
F	13	Luca Hischier	(Switzerland) SC Bern	undrafted
F	15	Kris Schmidli	(Canada) Kelowna Rockets	undrafted
F	16	Denis Malgin	(Switzerland) ZSC Lions	Draft-Eligible 2015
F	18	Kay Schweri	(Canada) Sherbrooke Phoenix	Draft-Eligible 2015
F	19	Marc Aeschlimann	(Switzerland) HC Davos	undrafted
F	21	Luca Fazzini	(Switzerland) HC Lugano	undrafted
F	22	Tim Wieser	(Canada) Sherbrooke Phoenix	undrafted
F	24	Pius Suter	(Canada) Guelph Storm	undrafted
F	26	Noah Rod	(Switzerland) Genève-Servette HC	San Jose Sharks
F	28	Timo Meier	(Canada) Halifax Mooseheads	Draft-Eligible 2015
