= Själin =

Själin is a surname. Notable people with the surname include:

- Calle Själin (born 1999), Swedish ice hockey player
- Pontus Själin (born 1996), Swedish ice hockey player
