= Westlund =

Westlund is a Swedish surname that may refer to:

- Alex Westlund (born 1975), American ice hockey goaltender
- Åsa Westlund (born 1976), Swedish politician
- Ben Westlund (1949–2010), American politician
- David Westlund (born 1995), Swedish ice hockey defenceman
- Simon Westlund (born 1994), Swedish speedcuber
- Sven-Olof Westlund (1932–2015), Swedish sprinter
- Tommy Westlund (born 1974), Swedish ice hockey right winger
- Warren Westlund (1926–1992), American rower
- Wilhelm Westlund (born 1995), Swedish ice hockey defenceman

== See also ==
- Westlund Place, California, a locality in the United States
