= 2014 NHL entry draft =

2014 North American ice hockey draft

General information
- Date: June 27–28, 2014
- Location: Wells Fargo Center; Philadelphia, Pennsylvania, U.S.
- Networks: TSN (Canada); NBCSN (United States; used TSN's feed)

Overview
- 210 total selections in 7 rounds
- First selection: (Canada) Aaron Ekblad (Florida Panthers)

The 2014 NHL entry draft was the 52nd draft for the National Hockey League. It was held on June 27–28, 2014, at the Wells Fargo Center in Philadelphia. The top three selections were Aaron Ekblad by the Florida Panthers, Sam Reinhart by the Buffalo Sabres, and Leon Draisaitl by the Edmonton Oilers. This draft featured the first selection of a player from Oceania with Australia's Nathan Walker being selected by the Washington Capitals in the third round.

As of 2026, there are 54 active NHL players from this draft.

== Eligibility ==
Ice hockey players born between January 1, 1994, and September 15, 1996, are eligible for selection in the 2014 NHL entry draft. Additionally, un-drafted, non-North American players born in 1993 are eligible for the draft; and those players who were drafted in the 2012 NHL entry draft, but not signed by an NHL team and who were born after June 30, 1994, are also eligible to re-enter the draft.

== Draft lottery ==
Since the 2012–13 season, all 14 teams not qualifying for the Stanley Cup playoffs have a "weighted" chance at winning the first overall selection. The Florida Panthers won the 2014 draft lottery that took place on April 15, 2014, thus moving them from the second-overall pick to the first-overall pick.

== Top prospects ==
Source: NHL Central Scouting final (April 8, 2014) ranking.

Ranking	North American skaters	European skaters
1	(Canada) Sam Bennett (C)	(Finland) Kasperi Kapanen (C)
2	(Canada) Aaron Ekblad (D)	(Sweden) William Nylander (C/RW)
3	(Canada) Sam Reinhart (C)	(Switzerland) Kevin Fiala (LW)
4	(Germany) Leon Draisaitl (C)	(Czech Republic) Jakub Vrana (LW/RW)
5	(Canada) Michael Dal Colle (C/LW)	(Czech Republic) David Pastrnak (RW)
6	(Canada) Jake Virtanen (RW)	(Sweden) Adrian Kempe (LW)
7	(Canada) Nick Ritchie (LW)	(Sweden) Marcus Pettersson (D)
8	(Canada) Brendan Perlini (LW)	(Czech Republic) Ondrej Kase (RW)
9	(Canada) Haydn Fleury (D)	(Sweden) Sebastian Aho (D)
10	(Canada) Jared McCann (C)	(Czech Republic) Dominik Masin (D)

Ranking	North American goalies	European goalies
1	(United States) Thatcher Demko	(Finland) Ville Husso
2	(Canada) Mason McDonald	(Sweden) Jonas Johansson
3	(Canada) Brent Moran	(Sweden) Linus Soderstrom

== Selections by round ==
The order of the 2014 entry draft is listed below.

= NHL All-Star team ·	= NHL All-Star (Note: Players are identified as an All-Star if they were selected for the All-Star game at any time in their career.) ·	= NHL All-Star and NHL All-Star team ·

=== Round one ===
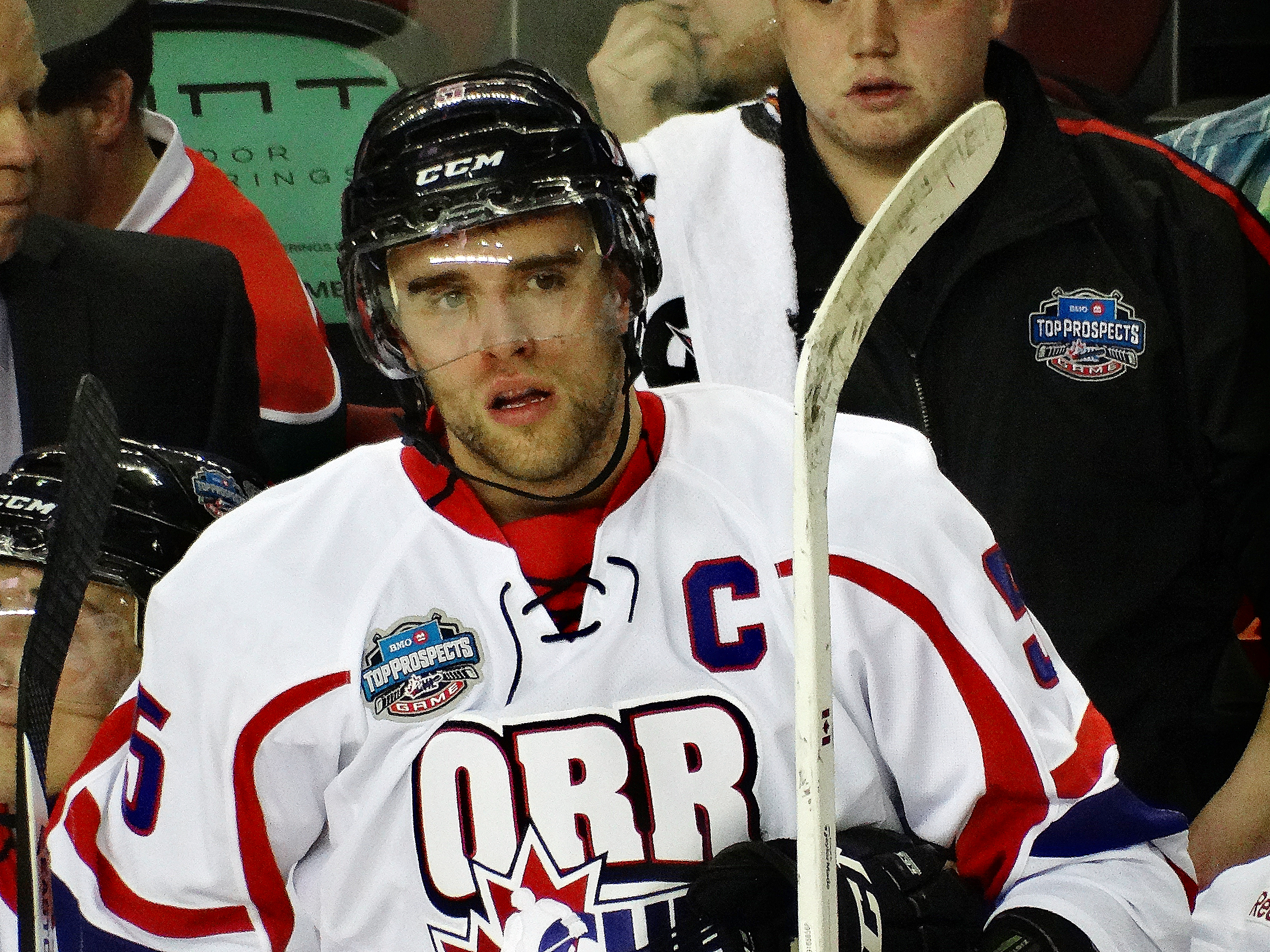
Aaron Ekblad was selected first overall by the Florida Panthers

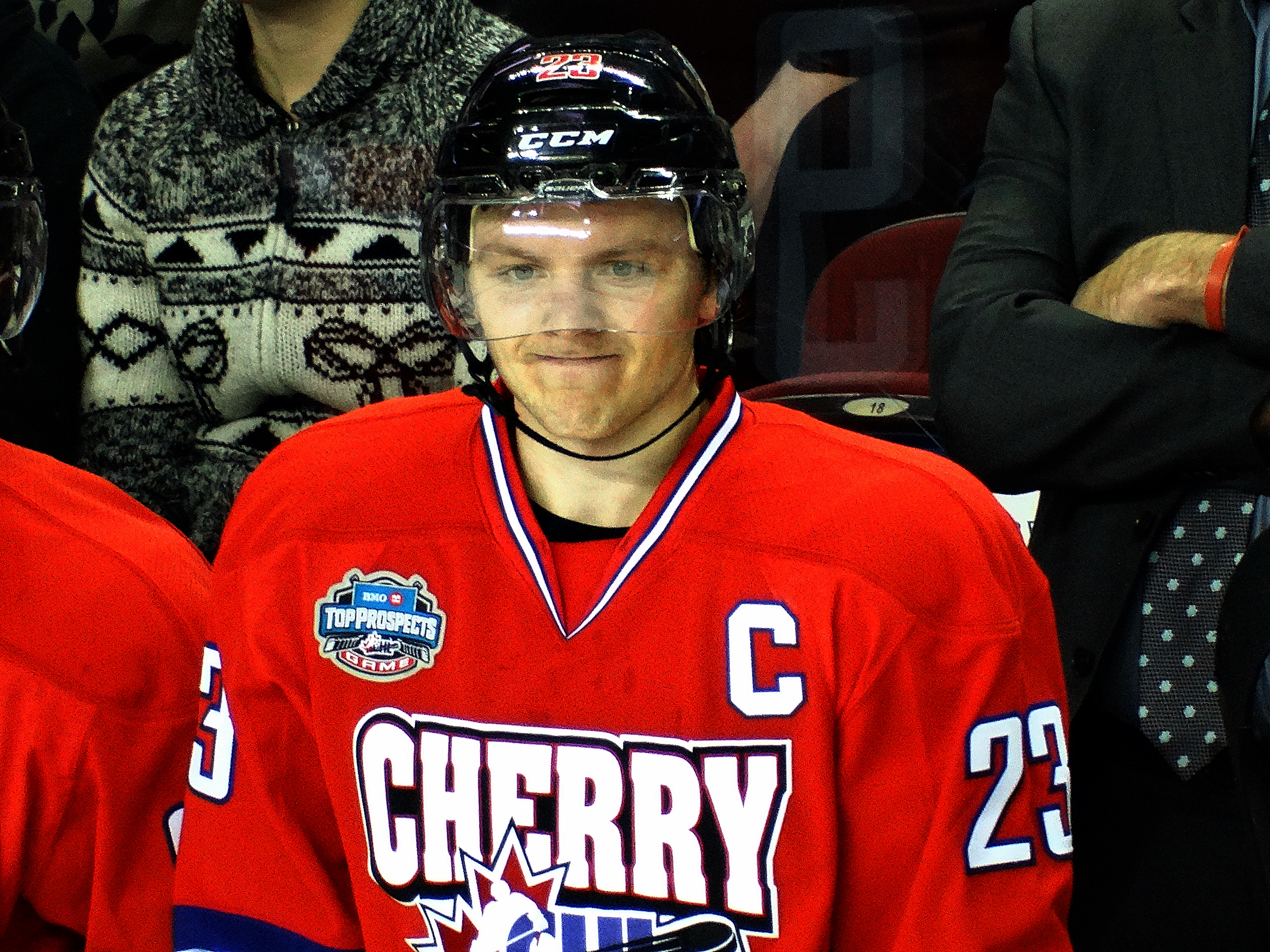
Sam Reinhart was selected second overall by the Buffalo Sabres.

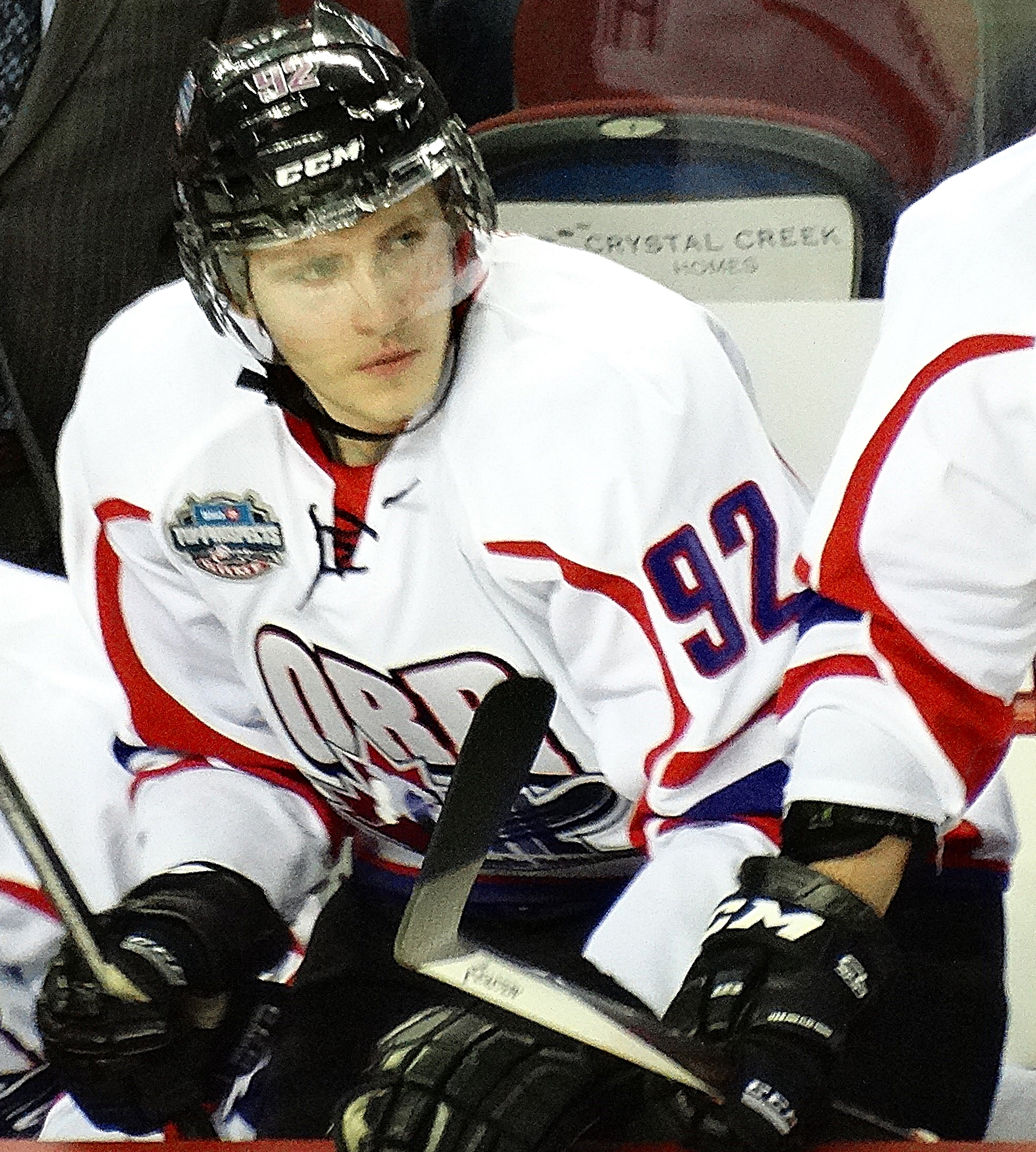
Leon Draisaitl selected third overall by the Edmonton Oilers.

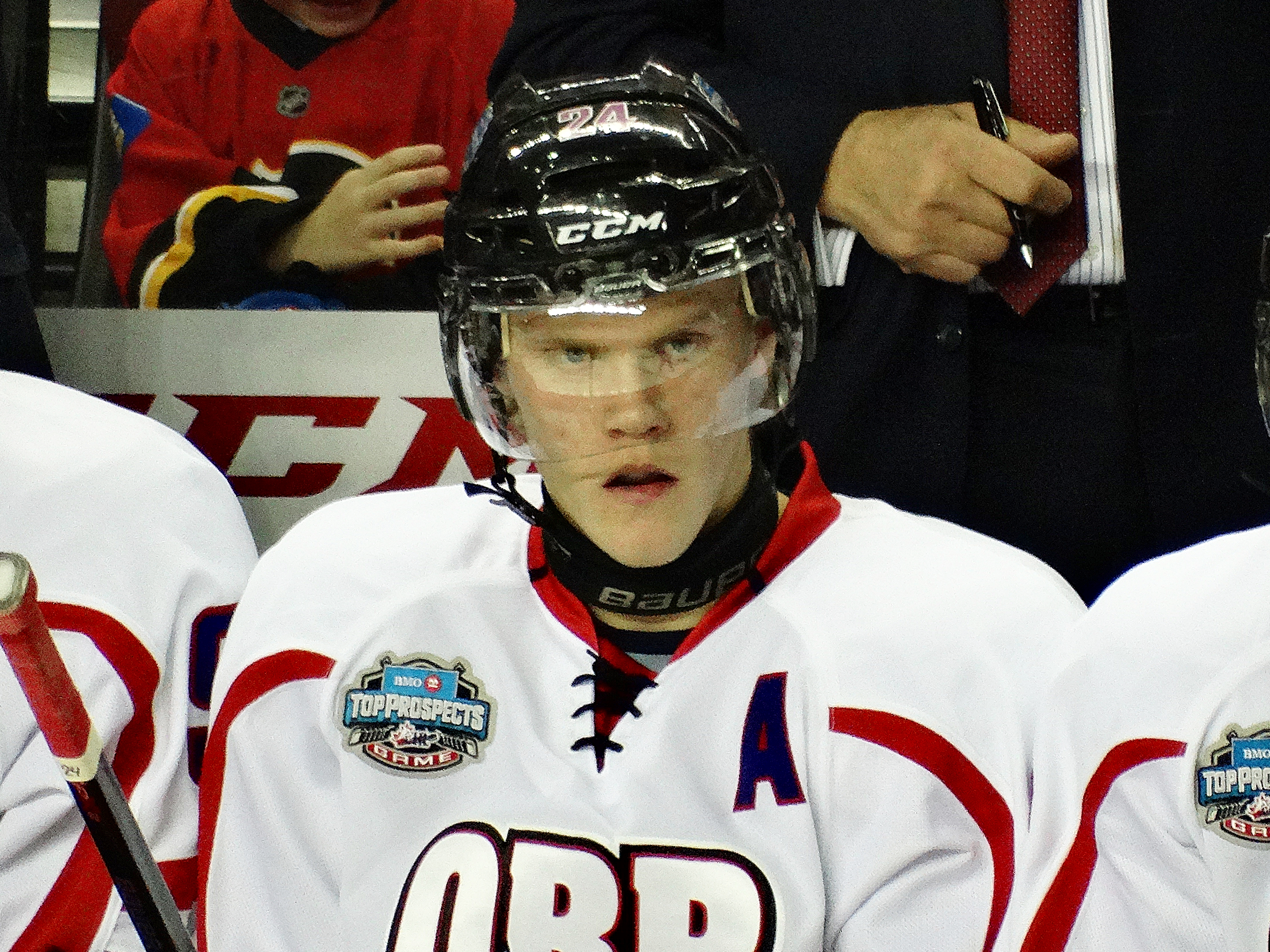
Nikolaj Ehlers was selected ninth overall by the Winnipeg Jets.

#	Player	Nationality	NHL team	College/junior/club team
1	Aaron Ekblad (D)	Canada	Florida Panthers	Barrie Colts (OHL)
2	Sam Reinhart (C)	Canada	Buffalo Sabres	Kootenay Ice (WHL)
3	Leon Draisaitl (C)	Germany	Edmonton Oilers	Prince Albert Raiders (WHL)
4	Sam Bennett (C)	Canada	Calgary Flames	Kingston Frontenacs (OHL)
5	Michael Dal Colle (LW)	Canada	New York Islanders	Oshawa Generals (OHL)
6	Jake Virtanen (RW)	Canada	Vancouver Canucks	Calgary Hitmen (WHL)
7	Haydn Fleury (D)	Canada	Carolina Hurricanes	Red Deer Rebels (WHL)
8	William Nylander (C/RW)	Sweden	Toronto Maple Leafs	MODO (SHL)
9	Nikolaj Ehlers (LW)	Denmark	Winnipeg Jets	Halifax Mooseheads (QMJHL)
10	Nick Ritchie (LW)	Canada	Anaheim Ducks (from Ottawa)^{1}	Peterborough Petes (OHL)
11	Kevin Fiala (LW)	Switzerland	Nashville Predators	HV71 (SHL)
12	Brendan Perlini (LW)	Canada	Arizona Coyotes	Niagara IceDogs (OHL)
13	Jakub Vrana (LW/RW)	Czech Republic	Washington Capitals	Linkopings HC (SHL)
14	Julius Honka (D)	Finland	Dallas Stars	Swift Current Broncos (WHL)
15	Dylan Larkin (C)	United States	Detroit Red Wings	US NTDP (USHL)
16	Sonny Milano (LW)	United States	Columbus Blue Jackets	US NTDP (USHL)
17	Travis Sanheim (D)	Canada	Philadelphia Flyers	Calgary Hitmen (WHL)
18	Alex Tuch (RW)	United States	Minnesota Wild	US NTDP (USHL)
19	Tony DeAngelo (D)	United States	Tampa Bay Lightning	Sarnia Sting (OHL)
20	Nick Schmaltz (C)	United States	Chicago Blackhawks (from San Jose)^{2}	Green Bay Gamblers (USHL)
21	Robby Fabbri (C)	Canada	St. Louis Blues	Guelph Storm (OHL)
22	Kasperi Kapanen (RW)	Finland	Pittsburgh Penguins	KalPa (Liiga)
23	Conner Bleackley (C)	Canada	Colorado Avalanche	Red Deer Rebels (WHL)
24	Jared McCann (C)	Canada	Vancouver Canucks (from Anaheim)^{3}	Sault Ste. Marie Greyhounds (OHL)
25	David Pastrnak (RW)	Czech Republic	Boston Bruins	Sodertalje SK (Sweden-2)
26	Nikita Scherbak (RW)	Russia	Montreal Canadiens	Saskatoon Blades (WHL)
27	Nikolay Goldobin (LW)	Russia	San Jose Sharks (from Chicago)^{4}	Sarnia Sting (OHL)
28	Josh Ho-Sang (RW)	Canada	New York Islanders (from NY Rangers via Tampa Bay)^{5}	Windsor Spitfires (OHL)
29	Adrian Kempe (C)	Sweden	Los Angeles Kings	MODO (SHL)
30	John Quenneville (C)	Canada	New Jersey Devils^{6}	Brandon Wheat Kings (WHL)

Notes

1. The Ottawa Senators' first-round pick went to the Anaheim Ducks as the result of a trade on July 5, 2013, that sent Bobby Ryan to Ottawa in exchange for Jakob Silfverberg, Stefan Noesen and this pick.
2. The San Jose Sharks' first-round pick went to the Chicago Blackhawks as the result of a trade on June 27, 2014, that sent a first-round pick in 2014 (27th overall) and Florida's third-round pick in 2014 (62nd overall) to San Jose in exchange for the Rangers sixth-round pick in 2014 (179th overall) and this pick.
3. The Anaheim Ducks' first-round pick went to the Vancouver Canucks as the result of a trade on June 27, 2014, that sent Ryan Kesler and a third-round pick in 2015 to Anaheim in exchange for Nick Bonino, Luca Sbisa, a third-round pick in 2014 (85th overall) and this pick.
4. The Chicago Blackhawks' first-round pick went to the San Jose Sharks as the result of a trade on June 27, 2014, that sent a first-round pick in 2014 (20th overall) and the Rangers sixth-round pick in 2014 (179th overall) to Chicago in exchange for Florida's third-round pick in 2014 (62nd overall) and this pick.
5. The New York Rangers' first-round pick went to the New York Islanders as the result of a trade on June 27, 2014, that sent the Islanders and Montreal's second-round picks both in 2014 (35th and 57th overall) to Tampa Bay in exchange for this pick.
  Tampa Bay previously acquired this pick as the result of a trade on March 5, 2014, that sent Martin St. Louis and a conditional second-round pick in 2015 to New York in exchange for Ryan Callahan, a first-round pick in 2015, a conditional seventh-round pick in 2015 and this pick (being conditional at the time of the trade). The condition – Tampa Bay will receive a first-round pick in 2014 if the Rangers advance to the 2014 Eastern Conference Final – was converted on May 13, 2014.
6. The New Jersey Devils picked 30th overall in the first round. The Devils were expected to forfeit their first-round pick in 2014 (they elected to keep their first-round picks in 2011, 2012, and 2013) as the result of a penalty sanction due to cap circumvention when signing Ilya Kovalchuk. The penalty also included a fine of $3 million and the forfeit of the Devils' third round pick in 2011. The NHL kept most of the penalties, except for modifying the first-round pick and reducing the fine to $1.5 million.

=== Round two ===
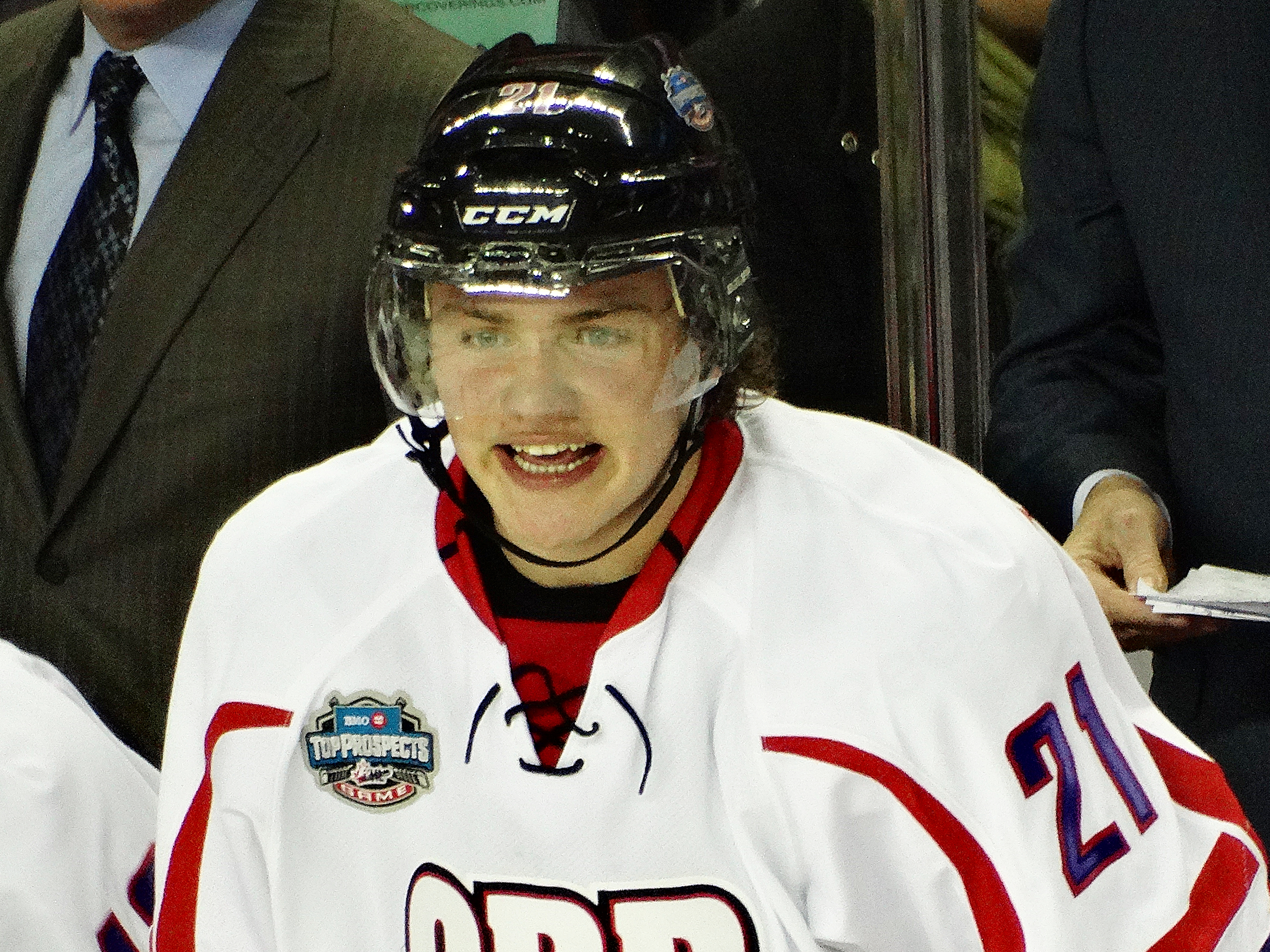
Brendan Lemieux was selected 31st overall by the Buffalo Sabres.

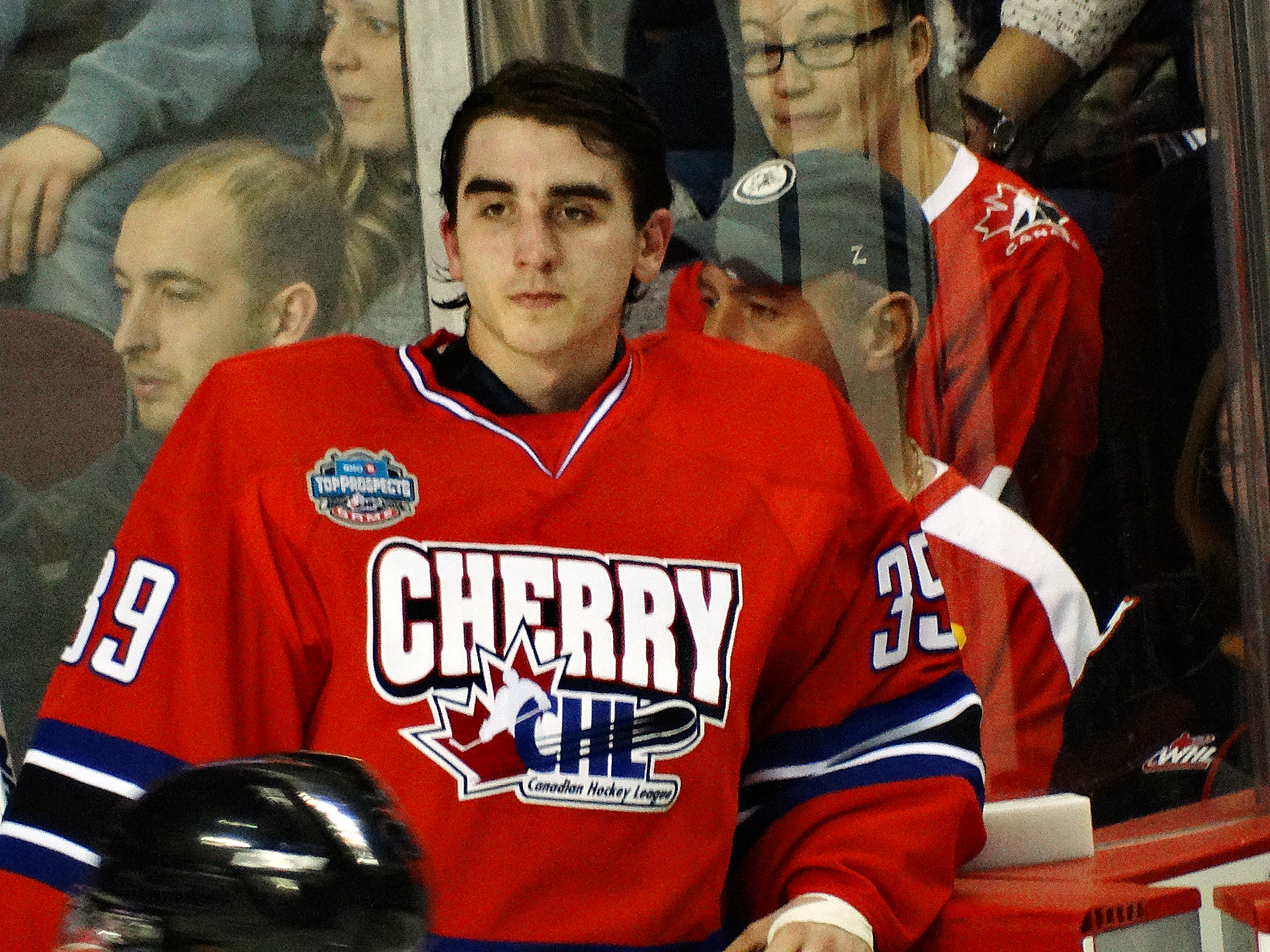
Alex Nedeljkovic was selected 37th overall by the Carolina Hurricanes.

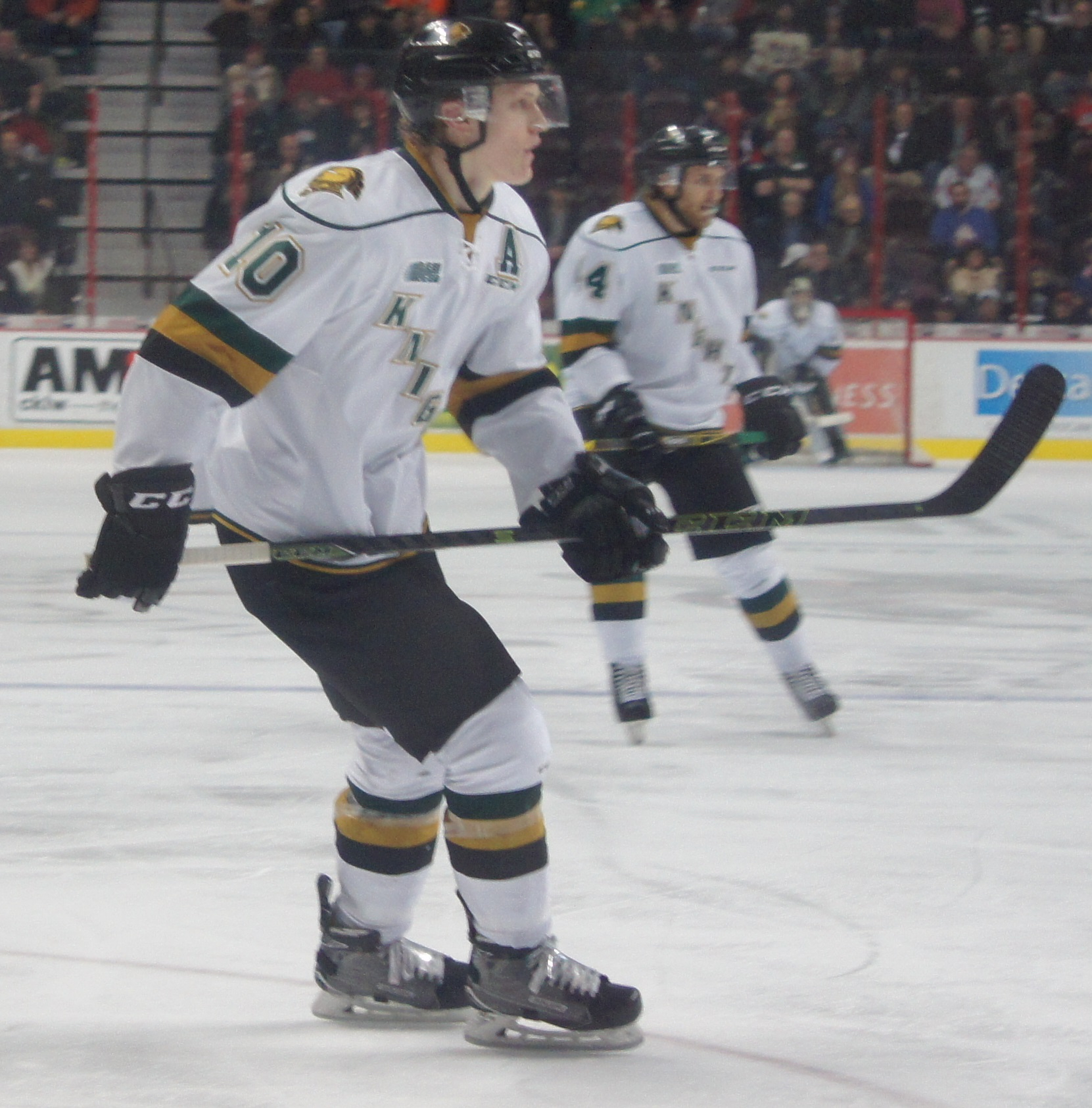
Christian Dvorak was selected 58th overall by the Arizona Coyotes.

#	Player	Nationality	NHL team	College/junior/club team
31	Brendan Lemieux (LW)	Canada	Buffalo Sabres	Barrie Colts (OHL)
32	Jayce Hawryluk (RW)	Canada	Florida Panthers	Brandon Wheat Kings (WHL)
33	Ivan Barbashev (C/LW)	Russia	St. Louis Blues (from Edmonton)^{1}	Moncton Wildcats (QMJHL)
34	Mason McDonald (G)	Canada	Calgary Flames	Charlottetown Islanders (QMJHL)
35	Dominik Masin (D)	Czech Republic	Tampa Bay Lightning (from New York Islanders)^{2}	HC Slavia Praha (ELH)
36	Thatcher Demko (G)	United States	Vancouver Canucks	Boston College Eagles (NCAA D1)
37	Alex Nedeljkovic (G)	United States	Carolina Hurricanes	Plymouth Whalers (OHL)
38	Marcus Pettersson (D)	Sweden	Anaheim Ducks (from Toronto)^{3}	Skelleftea AIK U20 (J20 SuperElit)
39	Vitek Vanecek (G)	Czech Republic	Washington Capitals (from Winnipeg via Minnesota and Buffalo)^{4}	HC Bili Tygri Liberec U20 (CZE U20)
40	Andreas Englund (D)	Sweden	Ottawa Senators	Djurgardens IF (J20 SuperElit)
41	Josh Jacobs (D)	United States	New Jersey Devils	Indiana Ice (USHL)
42	Vladislav Kamenev (LW)	Russia	Nashville Predators	Stalnye Lisy (MHL)
43	Ryan MacInnis (C)	United States	Arizona Coyotes	Kitchener Rangers (OHL)
44	Eric Cornel (C)	Canada	Buffalo Sabres (from Washington)^{5}	Peterborough Petes (OHL)
45	Brett Pollock (LW)	Canada	Dallas Stars	Edmonton Oil Kings (WHL)
46	Julius Bergman (D)	Sweden	San Jose Sharks (from Detroit via Nashville)^{6}	Frolunda HC U20 (J20 SuperElit)
47	Ryan Collins (D)	United States	Columbus Blue Jackets	US NTDP (USHL)
48	Nicolas Aube-Kubel (RW)	Canada	Philadelphia Flyers	Val-d'Or Foreurs (QMJHL)
49	Vaclav Karabacek (RW)	Czech Republic	Buffalo Sabres (from Minnesota)^{7}	Gatineau Olympiques (QMJHL)
50	Roland McKeown (D)	Canada	Los Angeles Kings (from Tampa Bay via Vancouver)^{8}	Kingston Frontenacs (OHL)
51	Jack Dougherty (D)	United States	Nashville Predators (from San Jose)^{9}	US NTDP (USHL)
52	Maxim Letunov (C)	Russia	St. Louis Blues	Youngstown Phantoms (USHL)
53	Noah Rod (RW)	Switzerland	San Jose Sharks (from Pittsburgh)^{10}	Geneve-Servette HC U20 (CH-U20)
54	Hunter Smith (RW)	Canada	Calgary Flames (from Colorado)^{11}	Oshawa Generals (OHL)
55	Brandon Montour (D)	Canada	Anaheim Ducks	Waterloo Black Hawks (USHL)
56	Ryan Donato (C)	United States	Boston Bruins	Dexter Varsity (NEPSAC)
57	Johnathan MacLeod (D)	United States	Tampa Bay Lightning (from Montreal via NY Islanders)^{12}	US NTDP (USHL)
58	Christian Dvorak (LW)	United States	Arizona Coyotes (from Chicago)^{13}	London Knights (OHL)
59	Brandon Halverson (G)	United States	New York Rangers	Sault Ste. Marie Greyhounds (OHL)
60	Alex Lintuniemi (D)	Finland	Los Angeles Kings (from Los Angeles via Buffalo)^{14}	Ottawa 67's (OHL)

Notes

1. The Edmonton Oilers' second-round pick went to the St. Louis Blues as the result of a trade on July 10, 2013, that sent David Perron and a third-round pick in 2015 to Edmonton in exchange for Magnus Paajarvi, a fourth-round pick in 2015 and this pick.
2. The New York Islanders' second-round pick went to the Tampa Bay Lightning as the result of a trade on June 27, 2014, that sent the Rangers first-round pick in 2014 (28th overall) to New York in exchange for Montreal's second-round pick in 2014 (57th overall) and this pick.
3. The Toronto Maple Leafs' second-round pick went to the Anaheim Ducks as the result of a trade on November 16, 2013, that sent Peter Holland and Brad Staubitz to Toronto in exchange for Jesse Blacker, Anaheim's seventh-round pick in 2014 and this pick (being conditional at the time of the trade). The condition – Anaheim will receive a second-round pick in 2014 if Holland plays in 25 or more games for the Maple Leafs during the 2013–14 NHL season – was converted on January 18, 2014.
4. The Winnipeg Jets' second-round pick went to the Washington Capitals as the result of a trade on June 28, 2014, that sent a second and third-round pick in 2014 (44th and 74th overall) to Buffalo in exchange for this pick.
  Buffalo previously acquired this pick as the result of a trade on March 5, 2014, that sent Matt Moulson and Cody McCormick to Minnesota for Torrey Mitchell, a second-round pick in 2016 and this pick.
  Minnesota previously acquired this pick as the result of a trade on July 5, 2013, that sent Devin Setoguchi to Winnipeg in exchange for this pick.
5. The Washington Capitals' second-round pick went to the Buffalo Sabres as the result of a trade on June 28, 2014, that sent Winnipeg's second-round pick in 2014 (39th overall) to Washington in exchange for a third-round pick in 2014 (74th overall) and this pick.
6. The Detroit Red Wings' second-round pick went to the San Jose Sharks as the result of a trade on June 28, 2014, that sent second-round pick in 2014 (51st overall) and a fourth-round pick in 2015 to Nashville in exchange for this pick.
  Nashville previously acquired this pick as the result of a trade on March 5, 2014, that sent David Legwand to Detroit in exchange for Patrick Eaves, Calle Jarnkrok, and this pick (being conditional at the time of the trade). The condition – Nashville will receive a second-round pick in 2014 if Detroit qualifies for the 2014 Stanley Cup playoffs – was converted on April 9, 2014.
7. The Minnesota Wild's second-round pick went to the Buffalo Sabres as the result of trade on April 3, 2013, that sent Jason Pominville and a fourth-round pick in 2014 to Minnesota in exchange for Matt Hackett, Johan Larsson, a first-round pick in 2013 and this pick.
8. The Tampa Bay Lightning's second-round pick went to the Los Angeles Kings as the result of a trade on June 28, 2014, that sent Linden Vey to Vancouver in exchange for this pick.
  Vancouver previously acquired this pick as the result of a trade on June 27, 2014, that sent Jason Garrison, the rights to Jeff Costello and a seventh-round pick in 2015 to Tampa Bay in exchange for this pick.
9. The San Jose Sharks' second-round pick went to the Nashville Predators as the result of a trade on June 28, 2014, that sent Detroit's second-round pick in 2014 (46th overall) to San Jose in exchange for a fourth-round pick in 2015 and this pick.
10. The Pittsburgh Penguins' second-round pick went to the San Jose Sharks as the result of a trade on March 25, 2013, that sent Douglas Murray to Pittsburgh in exchange for a second-round pick in 2013 and this pick (being conditional at the time of the trade). The condition – If Pittsburgh wins two rounds in the 2013 playoffs or if Murray re-signs with Pittsburgh, then San Jose will receive Pittsburgh's second-round pick in 2014 – was converted on May 24, 2013, when Pittsburgh advanced to the 2013 Eastern Conference Finals.
11. The Colorado Avalanche's second-round pick went to the Calgary Flames as the result of a trade on March 5, 2014, that sent Reto Berra to Colorado in exchange for this pick.
12. The Montreal Canadiens' second-round pick went to the Tampa Bay Lightning as the result of a trade on June 27, 2014, that sent the Rangers first-round pick in 2014 (28th overall) to the New York Islanders in exchange for the Islanders second-round pick in 2014 (35th overall) and this pick.
  The Islanders previously acquired this pick as the result of a trade on March 5, 2014, that sent Thomas Vanek and a conditional fifth-round pick in 2014 to Montreal in exchange for Sebastian Collberg and this pick (being conditional at the time of the trade). The condition – New York will receive a second-round pick in 2014 if Montreal qualifies for the 2014 Stanley Cup playoffs – was converted on April 1, 2014.
13. The Chicago Blackhawks' second-round pick went to the Arizona Coyotes as the result of a trade on March 4, 2014, that sent David Rundblad and Mathieu Brisebois to Chicago in exchange for this pick.
14. The Los Angeles Kings' second-round pick was re-acquired as the result of a trade on March 5, 2014, that sent Hudson Fasching and Nicolas Deslauriers to Buffalo in exchange for Brayden McNabb, Jonathan Parker, Los Angeles' second-round pick in 2015 and this pick.
  Buffalo previously acquired this pick as the result of a trade on April 1, 2013, that sent Robyn Regehr to Los Angeles in exchange for a second-round pick in 2015 and this pick.

=== Round three ===
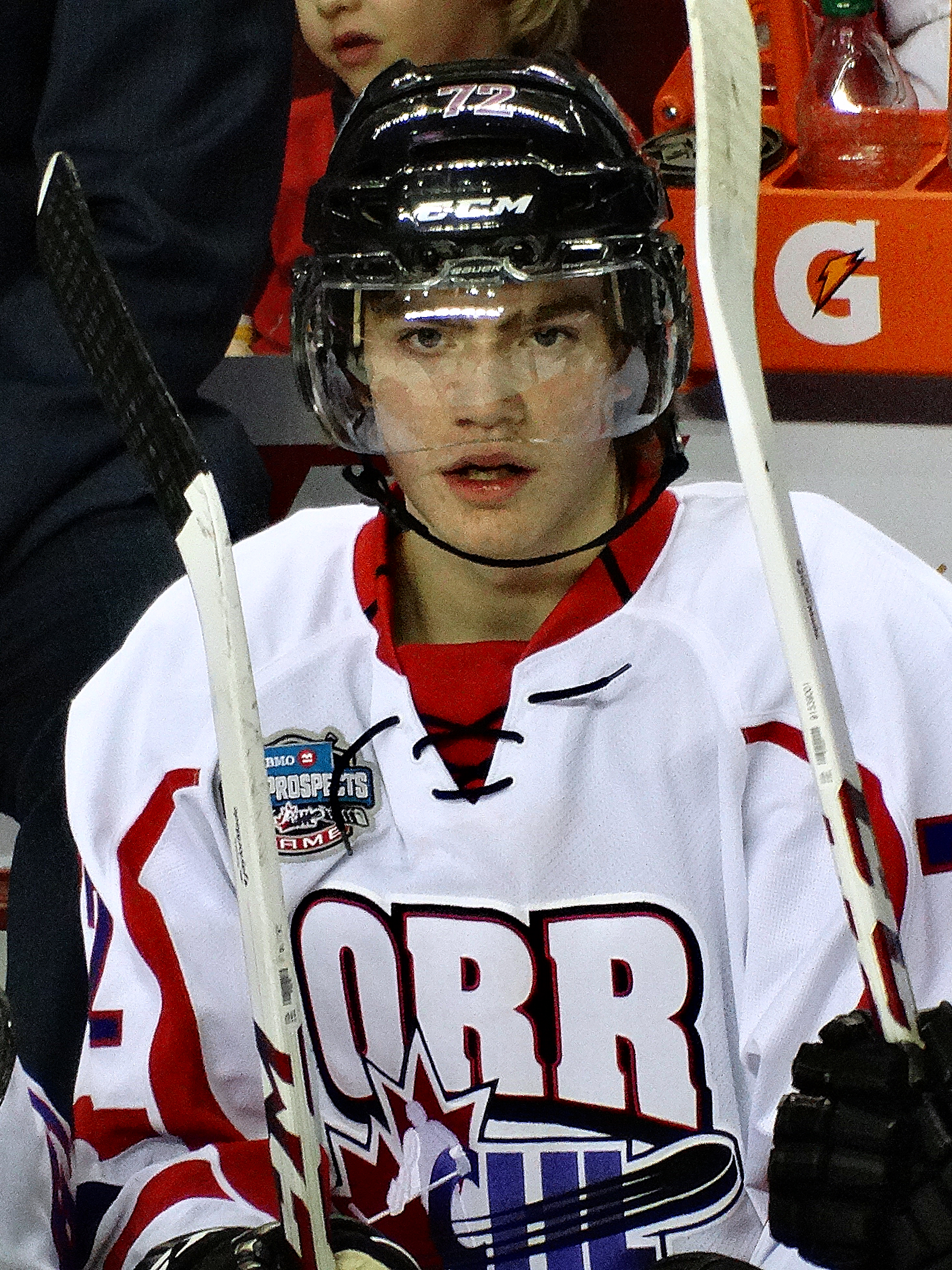
Brayden Point was selected 79th overall by the Tampa Bay Lightning.

#	Player	Nationality	NHL team	College/junior/club team
61	Jonas Johansson (G)	Sweden	Buffalo Sabres	Brynas IF U20 (J20 SuperElit)
62	Justin Kirkland (LW)	Canada	Nashville Predators (from Florida via Chicago and San Jose)^{1}	Kelowna Rockets (WHL)
63	Dominic Turgeon (C)	United States	Detroit Red Wings (from Edmonton via Los Angeles and Columbus)^{2}	Portland Winterhawks (WHL)
64	Brandon Hickey (D)	Canada	Calgary Flames	Spruce Grove Saints (AJHL)
65	Juho Lammikko (RW)	Finland	Florida Panthers (via New York Islanders)^{3}	Assat U20 (FIN U20)
66	Nikita Tryamkin (D)	Russia	Vancouver Canucks	Avtomobilist Yekaterinburg (KHL)
67	Warren Foegele (LW)	Canada	Carolina Hurricanes	St. Andrew's Saints (OFSAA)
68	Rinat Valiev (D)	Russia	Toronto Maple Leafs	Kootenay Ice (WHL)
69	Jack Glover (D)	United States	Winnipeg Jets	US NTDP (USHL)
70	Miles Gendron (D)	United States	Ottawa Senators	Rivers School Red Wings (NEPSAC)
71	Connor Chatham (RW)	Canada	New Jersey Devils	Plymouth Whalers (OHL)
72	Alex Schoenborn (RW)	United States	San Jose Sharks (from Nashville)^{4}	Portland Winterhawks (WHL)
73	Brett Lernout (D)	Canada	Montreal Canadiens (from Arizona)^{5}	Swift Current Broncos (WHL)
74	Brycen Martin (D)	Canada	Buffalo Sabres (from Washington)^{6}	Swift Current Broncos (WHL)
75	Alexander Peters (D)	Canada	Dallas Stars	Plymouth Whalers (OHL)
76	Elvis Merzlikins (G)	Latvia	Columbus Blue Jackets (from Detroit)^{7}	HC Lugano (NLA)
77	Blake Siebenaler (D)	United States	Columbus Blue Jackets	Niagara IceDogs (OHL)
78	Ilya Sorokin (G)	Russia	New York Islanders (from Philadelphia)^{8}	Metallurg Novokuznetsk (KHL)
79	Brayden Point (C)	Canada	Tampa Bay Lightning (from Minnesota)^{9}	Moose Jaw Warriors (WHL)
80	Louis Belpedio (D)	United States	Minnesota Wild (from Tampa Bay)^{10}	US NTDP (USHL)
81	Dylan Sadowy (LW)	Canada	San Jose Sharks	Saginaw Spirit (OHL)
82	Jake Walman (D)	Canada	St. Louis Blues	Toronto Jr. Canadiens (OJHL)
83	Matt Iacopelli (RW)	United States	Chicago Blackhawks (from Pittsburgh via Calgary)^{11}	Muskegon Lumberjacks (USHL)
84	Kyle Wood (D)	Canada	Colorado Avalanche	North Bay Battalion (OHL)
85	Keegan Iverson (C)	United States	New York Rangers (from Anaheim via Vancouver)^{12}	Portland Winterhawks
86	Mark Friedman (D)	Canada	Philadelphia Flyers (from Boston)^{13}	Waterloo Black Hawks (USHL)
87	Anton Karlsson (RW)	Sweden	Arizona Coyotes (from Montreal)^{14}	Frolunda HC U20 (J20 SuperElit)
88	Beau Starrett (LW)	United States	Chicago Blackhawks	South Shore Kings (USPHL Premier)
89	Nathan Walker (LW)	Australia	Washington Capitals (from NY Rangers)^{15}	Hershey Bears (AHL)
90	Michael Amadio (C)	Canada	Los Angeles Kings	North Bay Battalion (OHL)

Notes

1. The Florida Panthers' third-round pick went to the Nashville Predators as the result of a trade on June 28, 2014, that sent a third and fourth-round pick (72nd and 102nd overall) both in 2014 to San Jose in exchange for this pick.
  San Jose previously acquired this pick as the result of a trade on June 27, 2014, that sent a first-round pick and the Rangers sixth-round pick both in 2014 (20th and 179th overall) to Chicago in exchange for a first-round pick in 2014 (27th overall) and this pick.
  Chicago previously acquired this pick as the result of a trade on March 2, 2014, that sent Brandon Pirri to Florida in exchange for a fifth-round pick in 2016 and this pick.
2. The Edmonton Oilers' third-round pick went to the Detroit Red Wings as the result of a trade on June 28, 2014, that sent a third-round pick in 2014 (76th overall) and a third-round pick in 2015 to Columbus in exchange for this pick.
  Columbus previously acquired this pick as the result of a trade on March 5, 2014, that sent Marian Gaborik to Los Angeles in exchange for Matt Frattin, a second-round pick in 2014 or 2015 and this pick (being conditional at the time of the trade). The condition – Columbus will receive a third-round pick if Los Angeles wins one round in the 2014 Stanley Cup playoffs – was converted on April 30, 2014.
  Los Angeles previously acquired this pick as the result of a trade on January 15, 2014, that sent Ben Scrivens to Edmonton in exchange for this pick.
3. The New York Islanders' third-round pick went to the Florida Panthers as the result of a trade on June 28, 2014, that sent a third-round pick in 2015 to New York in exchange for this pick.
4. The Nashville Predators third-round pick went to the San Jose Sharks as the result of a trade on June 28, 2014, that sent Florida's third-round pick in 2014 (62nd overall) to Nashville in exchange for a fourth-round pick in 2014 (102nd overall) and this pick.
5. The Arizona Coyotes' third-round pick went to the Montreal Canadiens as the result of a trade on June 28, 2014, that sent a third and fourth-round pick in 2014 (87th and 117th overall) to Arizona in exchange for this pick.
6. The Washington Capitals' third-round pick went to the Buffalo Sabres as the result of a trade on June 28, 2014, that sent Winnipeg's second-round pick in 2014 (39th overall) to Washington in exchange for a second-round pick in 2014 (44th overall) and this pick.
7. The Detroit Red Wings' third-round pick went to the Columbus Blue Jackets as the result of a trade on June 28, 2014, that sent Edmonton's third-round pick in 2014 (63rd overall) to Detroit in exchange for a third-round pick in 2015 and this pick.
8. The Philadelphia Flyers' third-round pick went to the New York Islanders as the result of a trade March 4, 2014, that sent Andrew MacDonald to Philadelphia in exchange for Matt Mangene, a second-round pick in 2015 and this pick.
9. The Minnesota Wild's third-round pick went to the Tampa Bay Lightning as the result of a trade on June 28, 2014, that sent a third-round pick in 2014 (80th overall) and a seventh-round pick in 2015 to Minnesota in exchange for this pick.
10. The Tampa Bay Lightning's third-round pick went to the Minnesota Wild as the result of a trade on June 28, 2014, that sent a third-round pick in 2014 (79th overall) to Tampa Bay in exchange for a seventh-round pick in 2015 and this pick.
11. The Pittsburgh Penguins' third-round pick went to the Chicago Blackhawks as the result of a trade on June 28, 2014, that sent Brandon Bollig to Calgary in exchange for this pick.
  Calgary previously acquired this pick as the result of a trade on March 5, 2014, that sent Lee Stempniak to Pittsburgh in exchange for this pick.
12. The Anaheim Ducks' third-round pick went to the New York Rangers as the result of a trade on June 27, 2014, that sent Derek Dorsett to Vancouver in exchange for this pick.
  Vancouver previously acquired this pick as the result of a trade on June 27, 2014, that sent Ryan Kesler and a third-round pick in 2015 to Anaheim in exchange for Nick Bonino, Luca Sbisa, a first-round pick in 2014 (24th overall) and this pick.
13. The Boston Bruins' third-round pick went to the Philadelphia Flyers as the result of a trade on March 5, 2014, that sent Andrej Meszaros to Boston in exchange for this pick (being conditional at the time of the trade). The condition – Philadelphia will receive a third-round pick in 2014 if Meszaros does not re-sign with Boston prior to the 2014 NHL Entry Draft – was converted on June 27, 2014.
14. The Montreal Canadiens' third-round pick went to the Arizona Coyotes as the result of a trade on June 28, 2014, that sent a third-round pick in 2014 (73rd overall) to Montreal in exchange for a fourth-round pick in 2014 (117th overall) and this pick.
15. The New York Rangers' third-round pick went to the Washington Capitals as the result of a trade on June 28, 2014, that sent a fourth-round pick in 2014 (104th overall) and Chicago's fourth-round pick in 2014 (118th overall) to New York in exchange for this pick.

=== Round four ===
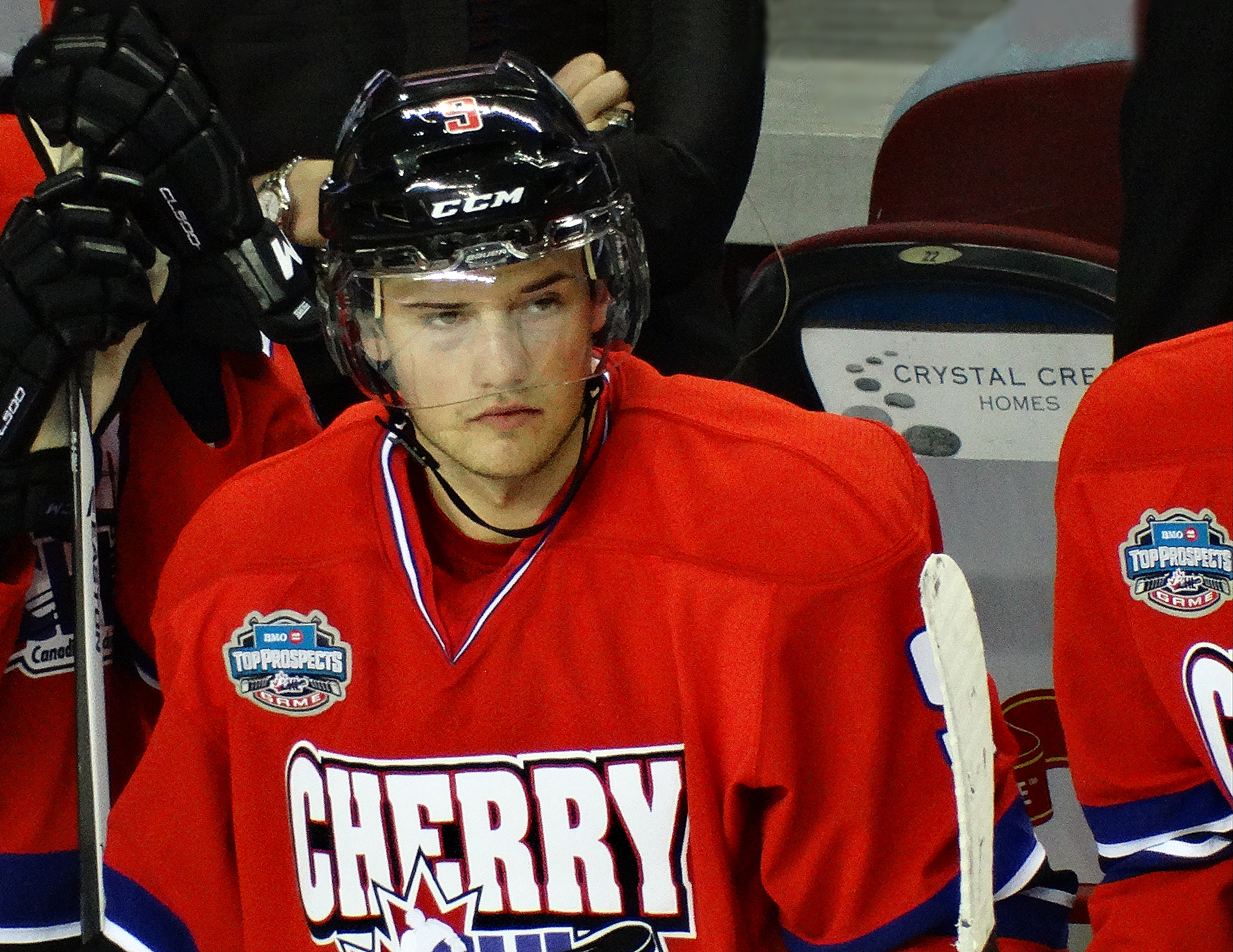
Chase De Leo was selected 99th overall by the Winnipeg Jets.

#	Player	Nationality	NHL team	College/junior/club team
91	William Lagesson (D)	Sweden	Edmonton Oilers (from Buffalo via Minnesota)^{1}	Frolunda HC U20 (J20 SuperElit)
92	Joe Wegwerth (RW)	United States	Florida Panthers	US NTDP (USHL)
93	Nicholas Magyar (RW)	United States	Colorado Avalanche (from Edmonton via Toronto)^{2}	Kitchener Rangers (OHL)
94	Ville Husso (G)	Finland	St. Louis Blues (from Calgary via Toronto)^{3}	HIFK (Liiga)
95	Linus Soderstrom (G)	Sweden	New York Islanders	Djurgardens IF (J20 SuperElit)
96	Josh Wesley (D)	United States	Carolina Hurricanes (from Vancouver)^{4}	Plymouth Whalers (OHL)
97	Lucas Wallmark (C)	Sweden	Carolina Hurricanes	Lulea HF (SHL)
98	Fredrik Olofsson (LW)	Sweden	Chicago Blackhawks (from Toronto)^{5}	Chicago Steel (USHL)
99	Chase De Leo (C)	United States	Winnipeg Jets	Portland Winterhawks (WHL)
100	Shane Eiserman (LW)	United States	Ottawa Senators	Dubuque Fighting Saints (USHL)
101	Nelson Nogier (D)	Canada	Winnipeg Jets (from New Jersey)^{6}	Saskatoon Blades (WHL)
102	Alexis Vanier (D)	Canada	San Jose Sharks (from Nashville)^{7}	Baie-Comeau Drakkar (QMJHL)
103	J.J. Piccinich (RW)	United States	Toronto Maple Leafs (from Arizona)^{8}	Youngstown Phantoms (USHL)
104	Ryan Mantha (RW)	United States	New York Rangers (from Washington)^{9}	Sioux City Musketeers (USHL)
105	Michael Prapavessis (D)	Canada	Dallas Stars	Toronto Lakeshore Patriots (OJHL)
106	Christoffer Ehn (C)	Sweden	Detroit Red Wings	Frolunda HC U20 (J20 SuperElit)
107	Julien Pelletier (LW)	Canada	Columbus Blue Jackets	Cape Breton Screaming Eagles (QMJHL)
108	Devon Toews (D)	Canada	New York Islanders (from Philadelphia)^{10}	Quinnipiac Bobcats (NCAA D1)
109	Kaapo Kahkonen (G)	Finland	Minnesota Wild	Espoo Blues U20 (FIN U20)
110	Austin Poganski (RW)	United States	St. Louis Blues (from Tampa Bay)^{11}	Tri-City Storm (USHL)
111	Zach Nagelvoort (G)	United States	Edmonton Oilers (from San Jose)^{12}	Michigan Wolverines (NCAA D1)
112	Viktor Arvidsson (LW)	Sweden	Nashville Predators (from St. Louis)^{13}	Skelleftea AIK U20 (J20 SuperElit)
113	Sam Lafferty (RW)	United States	Pittsburgh Penguins	Deerfield Big Green (NEPSAC)
114	Alexis Pepin (LW)	Canada	Colorado Avalanche	Gatineau Olympiques (QMJHL)
115	Brent Moran (G)	Canada	Dallas Stars (from Anaheim via Washington and Anaheim)^{14}	Niagara IceDogs (OHL)
116	Danton Heinen (C/LW)	Canada	Boston Bruins	Surrey Eagles (BCHL)
117	Michael Bunting (LW)	Canada	Arizona Coyotes (from Montreal)^{15}	Sault Ste. Marie Greyhounds (OHL)
118	Igor Shesterkin (G)	Russia	New York Rangers (from Chicago via NY Islanders and Washington)^{16}	JHC Spartak (MHL)
119	Ben Thomas (D)	Canada	Tampa Bay Lightning (via NY Rangers)^{17}	Calgary Hitmen (WHL)
120	Steven Johnson (D)	United States	Los Angeles Kings	Omaha Lancers (USHL)

Notes

1. The Buffalo Sabres' fourth-round pick went to the Edmonton Oilers as the result of a trade on March 4, 2014, that sent Ilya Bryzgalov to Minnesota in exchange for this pick.
  Minnesota previously acquired this pick as the result of trade on April 3, 2013, that sent Matt Hackett, Johan Larsson, a first-round pick in 2013 and a second-round pick in 2014 to Buffalo in exchange for Jason Pominville and this pick.
2. The Edmonton Oilers' fourth-round pick went to the Colorado Avalanche as the result of a trade on April 3, 2013, that sent Ryan O'Byrne to Toronto in exchange for this pick.
  Toronto previously acquired this pick as the result of a trade on March 4, 2013, that sent Mike Brown to Edmonton in exchange for this pick (being conditional at the time of the trade). The condition – Toronto will receive a fourth-round pick in 2014 if Edmonton fails to qualify for the 2013 Stanley Cup playoffs – was converted on April 21, 2013.
3. The Calgary Flames' fourth-round pick went to the St. Louis Blues as the result of a trade on June 28, 2014, that sent Roman Polak to Toronto in exchange for Carl Gunnarsson and this pick.
  Toronto previously acquired this pick as the result of a trade on September 29, 2013, that sent Joe Colborne to Calgary in exchange for this pick (being conditional at the time of the trade). The condition – If Calgary fails to qualify for the 2014 Stanley Cup playoffs then this pick will remain a fourth-round pick in 2014 – was converted on March 30, 2014.
4. The Vancouver Canucks' fourth-round pick went to the Carolina Hurricanes as the result of a trade on September 29, 2013, that sent Zac Dalpe and Jeremy Welsh to Vancouver in exchange for Kellan Tochkin and this pick.
5. The Toronto Maple Leafs' fourth-round pick went to the Chicago Blackhawks as the result of a trade June 30, 2013, that sent Dave Bolland to Toronto in exchange for a second-round pick in 2013, Anaheim's fourth-round pick in 2013 and this pick.
6. The New Jersey Devils' fourth-round pick went to the Winnipeg Jets as the result of a trade on February 13, 2013, that sent Alexei Ponikarovsky to New Jersey in exchange for a seventh-round pick in 2013 and this pick.
7. The Nashville Predators fourth-round pick went to the San Jose Sharks as the result of a trade on June 28, 2014, that sent Florida's third-round pick in 2014 (62nd overall) to Nashville in exchange for a third-round pick in 2014 (72nd overall) and this pick.
8. The Arizona Coyotes' fourth-round pick went to the Toronto Maple Leafs as the result of a trade on January 16, 2013, that sent Matthew Lombardi to Phoenix in exchange for this pick (being conditional at the time of the trade). The condition – If Lombardi does not re-sign with Phoenix for the 2013–14 season, then Toronto will receive a fourth-round pick in 2014 – was converted on August 29, 2013.
9. The Washington Capitals' foutrth-round pick went to the New York Rangers as the result of a trade on June 28, 2014, that sent a third-round pick in 2014 (89th overall) to Washington in exchange for Chicago's fourth-round pick in 2014 (118th overall) and this pick.
10. The Philadelphia Flyers' fourth-round pick went to the New York Islanders as the result of a trade on June 12, 2013, that sent Mark Streit to Philadelphia in exchange for Shane Harper and this pick.
11. The Tampa Bay Lightning's fourth-round pick went to the St. Louis Blues as the result of a trade on July 10, 2012, that sent B. J. Crombeen and a fifth-round pick in 2014 to Tampa Bay in exchange for a fourth-round pick in 2013 and this pick.
12. The San Jose Sharks' fourth-round pick went to the Edmonton Oilers as the result of a trade on October 21, 2013, that sent Mike Brown to San Jose in exchange for this pick.
13. The St. Louis Blues' fourth-round pick went to the Nashville Predators as the result of a trade on June 30, 2013, that sent a fourth-round pick in 2013 to St. Louis in exchange for a seventh-round pick in 2013 and this pick.
14. The Anaheim Ducks' fourth-round pick went to the Dallas Stars as the result of a trade on March 4, 2014, that sent Stephane Robidas to Anaheim in exchange for this pick (being conditional at the time of the trade). The condition – Dallas will receive a third-round pick in 2014 if Anaheim advances to the 2014 Western Conference Final and Robidas plays in at least 50% of Anaheim's playoff games. If both conditions are not converted then this will remain a fourth-round pick. – was converted on April 21, 2014, when Robidas was injured for the remainder of the 2014 Stanley Cup playoffs.
  Anaheim previously re-acquired this pick as the result of a trade on March 4, 2014, that sent Dustin Penner to Washington in exchange for this pick.
  Washington previously acquired this pick as the result of a trade on September 29, 2013, that sent Mathieu Perreault to Anaheim in exchange for John Mitchell and this pick.
15. The Montreal Canadiens' fourth-round pick went to the Arizona Coyotes as the result of a trade on June 28, 2014, that sent a third-round pick in 2014 (73rd overall) to Montreal in exchange for a third-round pick in 2014 (87th overall) and this pick.
16. The Chicago Blackhawks' fourth-round pick went to the New York Rangers as the result of a trade on June 28, 2014, that sent a third-round pick in 2014 (89th overall) to Washington in exchange for a fourth-round pick in 2014 (104th overall) and this pick.
  Washington previously acquired this pick as the result of a trade on May 1, 2014, that sent Jaroslav Halak to the New York Islanders in exchange for this pick.
  New York previously acquired this pick as the result of a trade on February 6, 2014, that sent Peter Regin and Pierre-Marc Bouchard to Chicago in exchange for this pick.
17. The New York Rangers' fourth-round pick went to the Tampa Bay Lightning as the result of a trade on June 28, 2014, that sent a fifth-round pick in 2014 (140th overall) and St. Louis' fifth-round pick in 2014 (142nd overall) to New York in exchange for this pick.

=== Round five ===
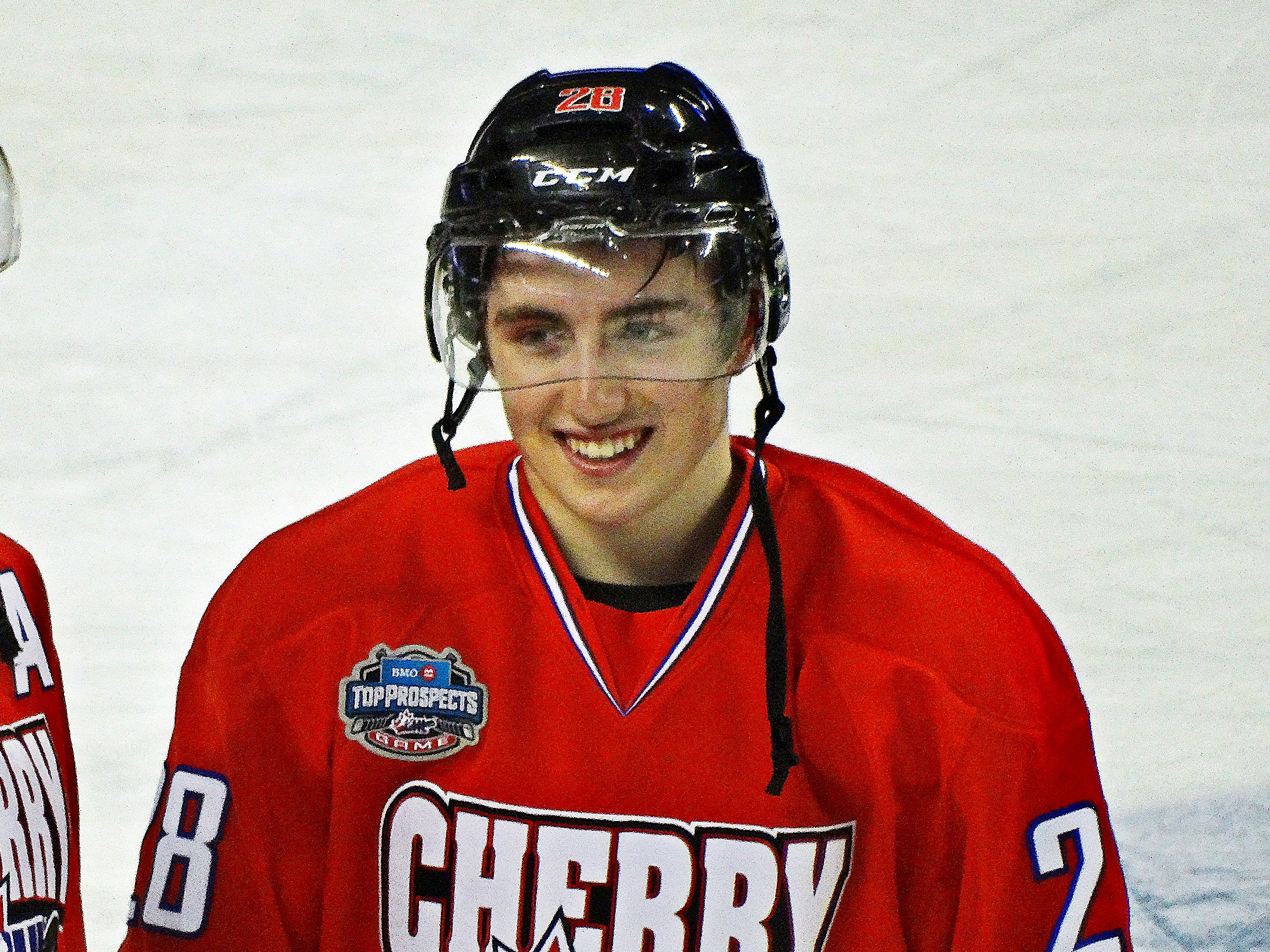
Daniel Audette was selected 147th overall by the Montreal Canadiens.

#	Player	Nationality	NHL team	College/junior/club team
121	Max Willman (C)	United States	Buffalo Sabres	Williston Northampton Wildcats (NEPSAC)
122	Richard Nejezchleb (LW)	Czech Republic	New York Rangers (from Florida)^{1}	Brandon Wheat Kings (WHL)
123	Matthew Berkovitz (D)	United States	Anaheim Ducks (from Edmonton)^{2}	Ashwaubenon Jaguars (WIAA)
124	Jaedon Descheneau (RW)	Canada	St. Louis Blues (from Calgary)^{3}	Kootenay Ice (WHL)
125	Nikolas Koberstein (D)	Canada	Montreal Canadiens (from NY Islanders)^{4}	Olds Grizzlys (AJHL)
126	Gustav Forsling (D)	Sweden	Vancouver Canucks	Linkopings HC (SHL)
127	Clark Bishop (C)	Canada	Carolina Hurricanes	Cape Breton Screaming Eagles (QMJHL)
128	Dakota Joshua (C)	United States	Toronto Maple Leafs	Sioux Falls Stampede (USHL)
129	C. J. Franklin (LW)	United States	Winnipeg Jets	Sioux Falls Stampede (USHL)
130	Liam Coughlin (LW)	United States	Edmonton Oilers (from Ottawa)^{5}	Vernon Vipers (BCHL)
131	Ryan Rehill (D)	Canada	New Jersey Devils	Kamloops Blazers (WHL)
132	Joonas Lyytinen (D)	Finland	Nashville Predators	KalPa (Liiga)
133	Dysin Mayo (D)	Canada	Arizona Coyotes	Edmonton Oil Kings (WHL)
134	Shane Gersich (C/LW)	United States	Washington Capitals	US NTDP (USHL)
135	Miro Karjalainen (D)	Finland	Dallas Stars	Jokerit (Liiga)
136	Chase Perry (G)	United States	Detroit Red Wings	Wenatchee Wild (NAHL)
137	Tyler Bird (RW)	United States	Columbus Blue Jackets (from Columbus via Edmonton)^{6}	Kimball Union Wildcats (NEPSAC)
138	Oskar Lindblom (LW)	Sweden	Philadelphia Flyers	Brynas IF U20 (J20 SuperElit)
139	Tanner Faith (D)	Canada	Minnesota Wild	Kootenay Ice (WHL)
140	Daniel Walcott (D)	Canada	New York Rangers (from Tampa Bay)^{7}	Blainville-Boisbriand Armada (QMJHL)
141	Luc Snuggerud (D)	United States	Chicago Blackhawks (from San Jose)^{8}	Eden Prairie Eagles (MSHSL)
142	Tyler Nanne (D)	United States	New York Rangers (from St. Louis via Tampa Bay)^{9}	Edina Hornets (MSHSL)
143	Miguel Fidler (LW)	United States	Florida Panthers (from Pittsburgh)^{10}	Edina Hornets (MSHSL)
144	Anton Lindholm (D)	Sweden	Colorado Avalanche	Skelleftea AIK Jr. (SWE)
145	Anthony Angello (C)	United States	Pittsburgh Penguins (from Anaheim)^{11}	Omaha Lancers (USHL)
146	Anders Bjork (LW)	United States	Boston Bruins	US NTDP (USHL)
147	Daniel Audette (C)	Canada	Montreal Canadiens	Sherbrooke Phoenix (QMJHL)
148	Andreas Soderberg (D)	Sweden	Chicago Blackhawks	Skelleftea AIK Jr. (SWE)
149	Rourke Chartier (C)	Canada	San Jose Sharks (from NY Rangers)^{12}	Kelowna Rockets (WHL)
150	Alec Dillon (G)	Canada	Los Angeles Kings	Victoria Grizzlies (BCHL)

Notes

1. The Florida Panthers' fifth-round pick went to the New York Rangers as the result of a trade on July 20, 2012, that sent Casey Wellman to Florida in exchange for this pick.
2. The Edmonton Oilers' fifth-round pick went to the Anaheim Ducks as the result of a trade on March 4, 2014, that sent Viktor Fasth to Edmonton in exchange for a third-round pick in 2015 and this pick.
3. The Calgary Flames' fifth-round pick went to the St. Louis Blues as the result of a trade on July 5, 2013, that sent Kris Russell to Calgary in exchange for this pick.
4. The New York Islanders' fifth-round pick went to the Montreal Canadiens as the result of a trade on March 5, 2014, that sent Sebastian Collberg and a conditional second-round pick in 2014 to New York in exchange for Thomas Vanek and this pick (being conditional at the time of the trade). The condition – Montreal will receive a fifth-round pick in 2014 if Montreal qualifies for the 2014 Stanley Cup playoffs – was converted on April 1, 2014.
5. The Ottawa Senators' fifth-round pick went to the Edmonton Oilers as the result of a trade on March 5, 2014, that sent Ales Hemsky to Ottawa in exchange for a third-round pick in 2015 and this pick.
6. The Columbus Blue Jackets' fifth-round pick was re-acquired as the result of a trade on June 25, 2014, that sent Nikita Nikitin to Edmonton in exchange for this pick.
  Edmonton previously acquired this pick as the result of a trade March 5, 2014, that sent Nick Schultz to Columbus in exchange for this pick.
7. The Tampa Bay Lightning's fifth-round pick went to the New York Rangers as the result of a trade on June 28, 2014, that sent a fourth-round pick in 2014 (119th overall) to Tampa Bay in exchange for St. Louis' fifth-round pick in 2014 (142nd overall) and this pick.
8. The San Jose Sharks' fifth-round pick went to the Chicago Blackhawks as the result of a trade on June 30, 2013, that sent Anaheim's fourth-round pick in 2013 and a fifth-round pick in 2013 to San Jose in exchange for a fourth-round pick in 2013 and this pick.
9. The St. Louis Blues' fifth-round pick went to the New York Rangers as the result of a trade on June 28, 2014, that sent a fourth-round pick in 2014 (119th overall) to Tampa Bay in exchange for a fifth-round pick in 2014 (140th overall) and this pick.
  Tampa Bay previously acquired this pick as the result of a trade on July 10, 2012, that sent fourth-round picks in 2013 and 2014 to St. Louis in exchange for B. J. Crombeen and this pick.
10. The Pittsburgh Penguins' fifth-round pick went to the Florida Panthers as the result of a trade on March 5, 2014, that sent Marcel Goc to Pittsburgh in exchange for a third-round pick in 2015 and this pick.
11. The Anaheim Ducks' fifth-round pick went to the Pittsburgh Penguins as the result of a trade on February 6, 2013, that sent Ben Lovejoy to Anaheim in exchange for this pick.
12. The New York Rangers' fifth-round pick went to the San Jose Sharks as the result of a trade on April 2, 2013, that sent Ryane Clowe to New York in exchange for a second-round pick in 2013, Florida's third-round pick in 2013 and this pick (being conditional at the time of the trade). The condition – If Clowe does not re-sign with New York and the Rangers do not advance to the Eastern Conference Final then San Jose will receive a fifth-round pick in 2014 – was converted on July 5, 2013.

=== Round six ===
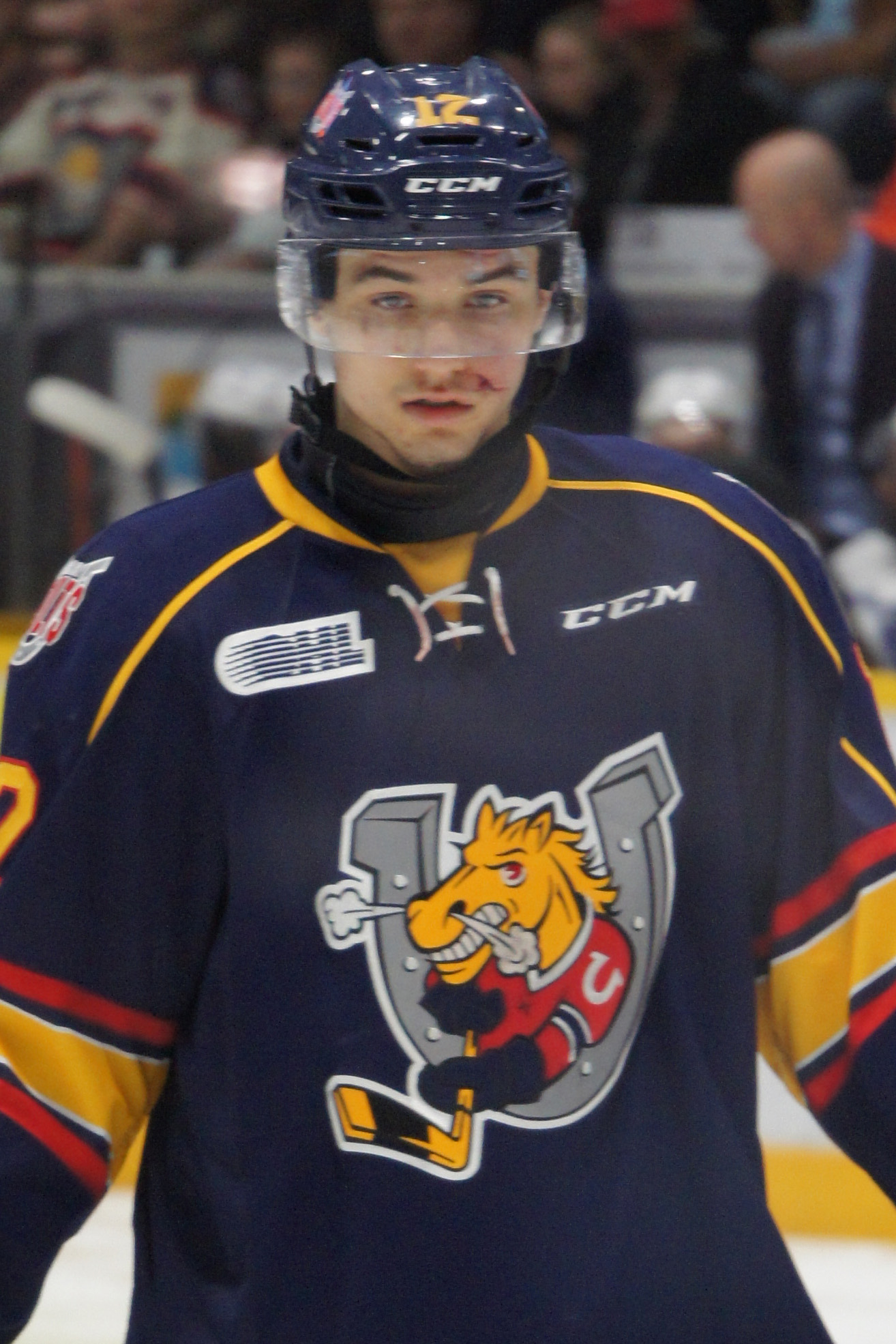
Kevin Labanc was selected 171st overall by the San Jose Sharks.

#	Player	Nationality	NHL team	College/junior/club team
151	Christopher Brown (C)	United States	Buffalo Sabres	Cranbrook Kingswood
152	Joey Dudek (C)	United States	New Jersey Devils (from Florida)^{1}	Kimball Union
153	Tyler Vesel (C)	United States	Edmonton Oilers	Omaha Lancers (USHL)
154	Aaron Haydon (D)	United States	Dallas Stars (from Calgary)^{2}	Niagara IceDogs (OHL)
155	Kyle Schempp (C)	United States	New York Islanders	Ferris State (WCHA)
156	Kyle Pettit (C)	Canada	Vancouver Canucks	Erie Otters (OHL)
157	Jake Marchment (C)	Canada	Los Angeles Kings (from Carolina)^{3}	Belleville Bulls (OHL)
158	Nolan Vesey (LW)	United States	Toronto Maple Leafs	South Shore Kings (EJHL)
159	Steven Spinner (RW)	United States	Washington Capitals (from Winnipeg)^{4}	Eden Prairie Eagles (MSHSL)
160	Pontus Sjalin (D)	Sweden	Minnesota Wild (from Ottawa)^{5}	Ostersunds
161	Brandon Baddock (LW)	Canada	New Jersey Devils	Edmonton Oil Kings (WHL)
162	Aaron Irving (D)	Canada	Nashville Predators	Edmonton Oil Kings (WHL)
163	David Westlund (D)	Sweden	Arizona Coyotes	Brynas IF Jr
164	Pavel Kraskovsky (C)	Russia	Winnipeg Jets (from Washington)^{6}	Lokomotiv Yaroslavl 2
165	John Nyberg (D)	Sweden	Dallas Stars	Frolunda HC Jr.
166	Julius Vahatalo (LW)	Finland	Detroit Red Wings	TPS (Liiga)
167	Chase Lang (C)	Canada	Minnesota Wild (from Columbus via NY Rangers)^{7}	Calgary Hitmen (WHL)
168	Radel Fazleyev (C)	Russia	Philadelphia Flyers	Calgary Hitmen (WHL)
169	Reid Duke (C)	Canada	Minnesota Wild	Lethbridge Hurricanes (WHL)
170	Cristiano DiGiacinto (LW)	Canada	Tampa Bay Lightning	Windsor Spitfires (OHL)
171	Kevin Labanc (RW)	United States	San Jose Sharks	Barrie Colts (OHL)
172	C. J. Yakimowicz (RW)	United States	St. Louis Blues	London Knights (OHL)
173	Jaden Lindo (RW)	Canada	Pittsburgh Penguins	Owen Sound Attack (OHL)
174	Maximilian Pajpach (G)	Slovakia	Colorado Avalanche	Slovakia U18
175	Adam Ollas Mattsson (D)	Sweden	Calgary Flames (from Anaheim)^{8}	Djurgardens IF Jr.
176	Samuel Blais (LW)	Canada	St. Louis Blues (from Boston)^{9}	Victoriaville Tigres (QMJHL)
177	Hayden Hawkey (G)	United States	Montreal Canadiens	Omaha Lancers (USHL)
178	Dylan Sikura (C)	Canada	Chicago Blackhawks	Aurora Tigers (OJHL)
179	Ivan Nalimov (G)	Russia	Chicago Blackhawks (from NY Rangers via San Jose)^{10}	SKA St. Petersburg-2
180	Matthew Mistele (LW)	Canada	Los Angeles Kings	Plymouth Whalers (OHL)

Notes

1. The Florida Panthers' sixth-round pick went to the New Jersey Devils as the result of a trade on September 28, 2013, that sent Krys Barch and St. Louis' seventh-round pick in 2015 to Florida in exchange for Scott Timmins and this pick.
2. The Calgary Flames' sixth-round pick went to the Dallas Stars as the result of a trade on November 22, 2013, that sent Lane MacDermid to Calgary in exchange for this pick.
3. The Carolina Hurricanes' sixth-round pick went to the Los Angeles Kings as the result of a trade on January 13, 2013, that sent Kevin Westgarth to Carolina in exchange for Anthony Stewart, a 4th round pick in 2013, and this pick.
4. The Winnipeg Jets' sixth-round pick went to the Washington Capitals as the result of a trade on June 28, 2014, that sent a sixth-round pick in 2014 (164th overall), Nashville's seventh-round pick in 2014 (192nd overall) and a seventh-round pick in 2015 to Winnipeg in exchange for Edward Pasquale and this pick.
5. The Ottawa Senators' sixth-round pick went to the Minnesota Wild as the result of a trade on March 12, 2013, that sent Matt Kassian to Ottawa in exchange for this pick.
6. The Washington Capitals sixth-round pick went to the Winnipeg Jets as the result of a trade on June 28, 2014, that sent Edward Pasquale and a sixth-round pick in 2014 (159th overall) to Washington in exchange for Nashville's seventh-round pick in 2014 (192nd overall), a seventh-round pick in 2015 and this pick.
7. The Columbus Blue Jackets' sixth-round pick went to the Minnesota Wild as the result of a trade on June 30, 2013, that sent Justin Falk to the New York Rangers in exchange for Benn Ferriero and this pick.
  New York previously acquired this pick as the result of a trade on April 3, 2013, that sent Marian Gaborik, Blake Parlett and Steven Delisle to Columbus in exchange for Derick Brassard, Derek Dorsett, John Moore and this pick.
8. The Anaheim Ducks' sixth-round pick went to the Calgary Flames as the result of a trade on November 21, 2013, that sent Tim Jackman to Anaheim in exchange for this pick.
9. The Boston Bruins' sixth-round pick went to the St. Louis Blues as the result of a trade on April 3, 2013, that sent Wade Redden to Boston in exchange for this pick (being conditional at the time of the trade). The condition – St. Louis will receive a sixth-round pick in 2014 if Redden appears in one playoff game in the 2013 Stanley Cup playoffs for the Bruins – was converted on May 1, 2013.
10. The New York Rangers' sixth-round pick went to the Chicago Blackhawks as the result of a trade on June 27, 2014, that sent a first-round pick and Florida's third-round pick both in 2014 (27th and 62nd overall) to San Jose in exchange for a first-round pick in 2014 (20th overall) and this pick.
  San Jose previously acquired this pick as the result of a trade on January 16, 2013, that sent Brandon Mashinter to New York in exchange for Tommy Grant and this pick (being conditional at the time of the trade). The condition – San Jose will receive a sixth-round pick in 2014 if Mashinter was a signed player on the Rangers reserve list at some point during the 2013–14 NHL season. – was converted on August 5, 2013, when Mashinter re-signed with the Rangers for the 2013–14 NHL season.

=== Round seven ===
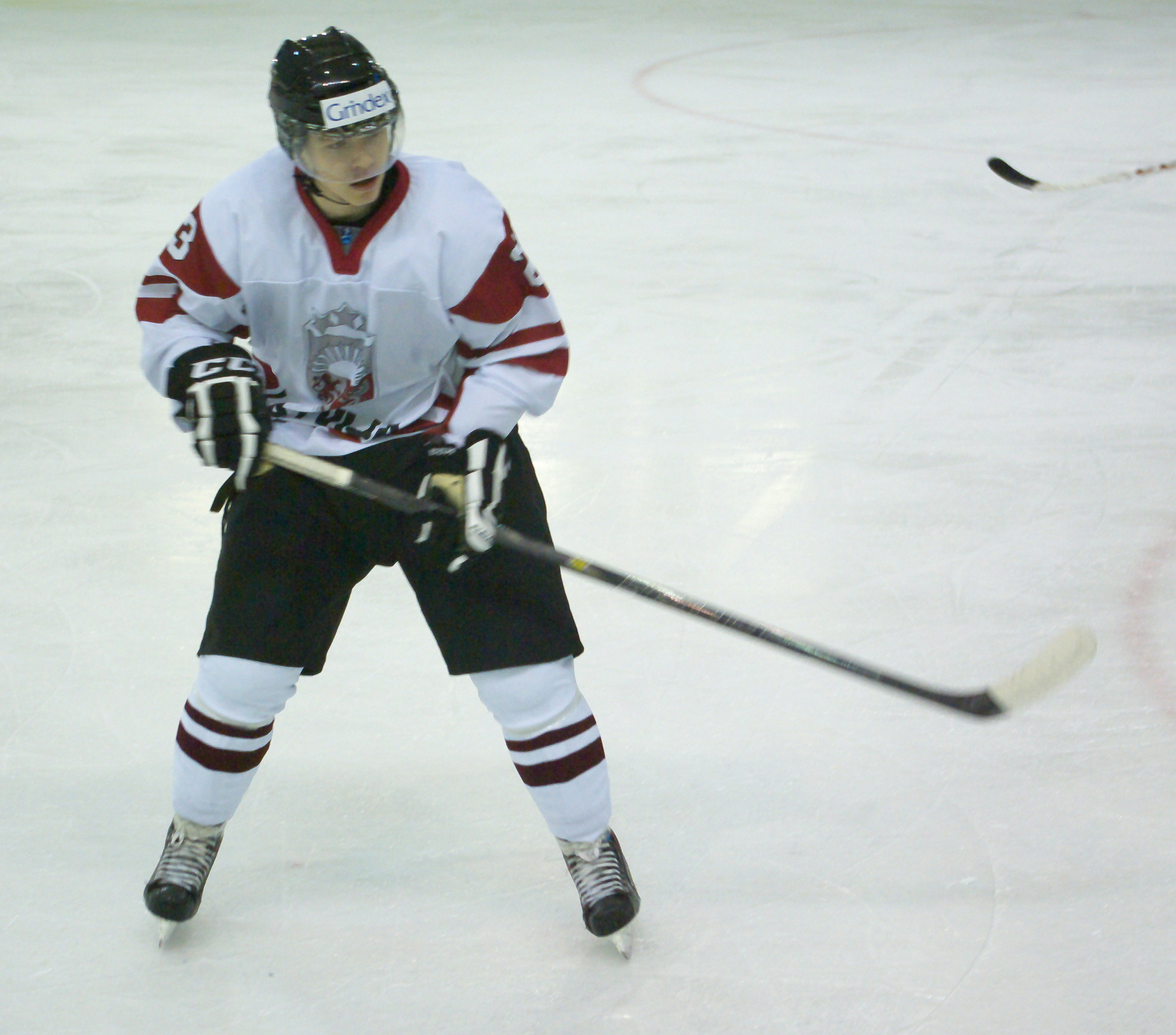
Edgars Kulda was selected 193rd overall by the Arizona Coyotes.

#	Player	Nationality	NHL team	College/junior/club team
181	Victor Olofsson (RW)	Sweden	Buffalo Sabres	Modo Sweden
182	Hugo Fagerblom (G)	Sweden	Florida Panthers (from Florida via Montreal)^{1}	Frolunda HC Sweden Jr.
183	Kevin Bouchard (G)	Canada	Edmonton Oilers	Val-d'Or Foreurs (QMJHL)
184	Austin Carroll (RW)	Canada	Calgary Flames	Victoria Royals (WHL)
185	Cameron Darcy (C)	United States	Tampa Bay Lightning (from NY Islanders)^{2}	Cape Breton Screaming Eagles (QMJHL)
186	MacKenze Stewart (D)	Canada	Vancouver Canucks	Prince Albert Raiders (WHL)
187	Kyle Jenkins (D)	Canada	Carolina Hurricanes	Sault Ste. Marie Greyhounds (OHL)
188	Pierre Engvall (LW)	Sweden	Toronto Maple Leafs	Frolunda HC Jr
189	Kelly Summers (D)	Canada	Ottawa Senators (from Winnipeg)^{3}	Carleton Place (CCHL)
190	Francis Perron (LW)	Canada	Ottawa Senators	Rouyn-Noranda Huskies (QMJHL)
191	Jared Fiegl (LW)	United States	Arizona Coyotes (from New Jersey)^{4}	US NTDP (USHL)
192	Matt Ustaski (C/LW)	United States	Winnipeg Jets (from Nashville via Washington)^{5}	Langley (BCHL)
193	Edgars Kulda (LW)	Latvia	Arizona Coyotes	Edmonton Oil Kings (WHL)
194	Kevin Elgestal (RW)	Sweden	Washington Capitals	Frolunda HC Jr. (SWE)
195	Patrick Sanvido (D)	Canada	Dallas Stars	Windsor Spitfires (OHL)
196	Axel Holmstrom (C)	Sweden	Detroit Red Wings	Skelleftea AIK (SHL)
197	Olivier Leblanc (D)	Canada	Columbus Blue Jackets	Saint John Sea Dogs (QMJHL)
198	Jesper Pettersson (D)	Sweden	Philadelphia Flyers	Linkopings HC (SWE)
199	Pavel Jenys (C)	Czech Republic	Minnesota Wild	HC Kometa Brno (CZE)
200	Lukas Sutter (C)	United States	New York Islanders (from Tampa Bay)^{6}	Red Deer Rebels (WHL)
201	Alexander Kadeikin (C)	Russia	Detroit Red Wings (from San Jose)^{7}	Atlant Moscow Oblast (KHL)
202	Dwyer Tschantz (RW)	United States	St. Louis Blues	Indiana Ice (USHL)
203	Jeff Taylor (D)	United States	Pittsburgh Penguins	Union College (ECAC)
204	Julien Nantel (C/LW)	Canada	Colorado Avalanche	Rouyn-Noranda Huskies (QMJHL)
205	Ondrej Kase (RW)	Czech Republic	Anaheim Ducks (from Anaheim via Toronto)^{8}	Pirati Chomutov (CZE)
206	Emil Johansson (D)	Sweden	Boston Bruins	HV71 Jr. (SWE)
207	Jake Evans (C/RW)	Canada	Montreal Canadiens	St. Michael's Buzzers (OJHL)
208	Jack Ramsey (RW)	United States	Chicago Blackhawks	Penticton Vees (BCHL)
209	Spencer Watson (RW)	Canada	Los Angeles Kings (from NY Rangers)^{9}	Kingston Frontenacs (OHL)
210	Jacob Middleton (D)	Canada	Los Angeles Kings	Ottawa 67's (OHL)

Notes

1. The Florida Panthers' seventh-round pick was re-acquired as the result of a trade on July 5, 2013, that sent George Parros to Montreal in exchange for Philippe Lefebvre and this pick.
  Montreal previously acquired this pick as the result of a trade on June 30, 2013, that sent a seventh-round pick in 2013 to Florida in exchange for this pick.
2. The New York Islanders' seventh-round pick went to the Tampa Bay Lightning as the result of a trade on June 28, 2014, that sent a seventh-round pick in 2014 (200th overall) and a seventh-round pick in 2015 to New York in exchange for this pick.
3. The Winnipeg Jets' seventh-round pick went to the Ottawa Senators as the result of a trade on June 28, 2014, that sent a sixth-round pick in 2015 to Winnipeg in exchange for this pick.
4. The New Jersey Devils' seventh-round pick went to the Arizona Coyotes as the result of a trade on April 3, 2013, that sent Steve Sullivan to New Jersey in exchange for this pick.
5. The Nashville Predators' seventh-round pick went to the Winnipeg Jets as the result of a trade on June 28, 2014, that sent Edward Pasquale and a sixth-round pick in 2014 (159th overall) to Washington in exchange for a sixth-round pick in 2014 (164th overall), a seventh-round pick in 2015 and this pick.
  Washington previously acquired this pick as the result of a trade on April 19, 2014, that sent Jaynen Rissling to Nashville in exchange for this pick.
6. The Tampa Bay Lightning's seventh-round pick went to the New York Islanders as the result of a trade on June 28, 2014, that sent a seventh-round pick in 2014 (185th overall) to Tampa Bay in exchange for a seventh-round pick in 2015 and this pick.
7. The San Jose Sharks' seventh-round pick went to the Detroit Red Wings as the result of a trade on June 10, 2012, that sent Brad Stuart to San Jose in exchange for Andrew Murray and this pick (being conditional at the time of the trade). The condition – Stuart is re-signed by San Jose for the 2012–13 season – was converted on June 18, 2012.
8. The Anaheim Ducks' seventh-round pick was re-acquired as the result of a trade on November 16, 2013, that sent Peter Holland and Brad Staubitz to Toronto in exchange for Jesse Blacker, a conditional second-round pick in 2014 and this pick.
  Toronto previously acquired this pick as the result of a trade on March 15, 2013, that sent Dave Steckel to Anaheim in exchange for Ryan Lasch and this pick.
9. The New York Rangers' seventh-round pick went to the Los Angeles Kings as the result of a trade on January 4, 2014, that sent Daniel Carcillo to New York in exchange for this pick (being conditional at the time of the trade). The condition and date of conversion are unknown.

== Draftees based on nationality ==
Rank	Country	Picks	Percent	Top selection
	North America	144	68.6%	
1	Canada	80	38.1%	Aaron Ekblad, 1st
2	United States	64	30.5%	Dylan Larkin, 15th
	Europe	65	31.0%	
3	Sweden	28	13.3%	William Nylander, 8th
4	Russia	13	6.2%	Nikita Scherbak, 26th
5	Finland	9	4.3%	Julius Honka, 14th
6	Czech Republic	8	3.8%	Jakub Vrana, 13th
7	Switzerland	2	0.9%	Kevin Fiala, 11th
	Latvia	2	0.9%	Elvis Merzlikins, 76th
9	Denmark	1	0.5%	Nikolaj Ehlers, 9th
	Germany	1	0.5%	Leon Draisaitl, 3rd
	Slovakia	1	0.5%	Maximilian Pajpach, 174th
	Oceania	1	0.5%	
	Australia	1	0.5%	Nathan Walker, 89th

=== North American draftees by state or province ===
Rank	State or province	Selections	Top selection
1	Ontario	35	Aaron Ekblad, 1st
2	Alberta	16	Conner Bleackley, 23rd
3	Minnesota	15	Ryan Collins, 47th
4	Quebec	11	Nicolas Aube-Kubel, 48th
5	Michigan	10	Dylan Larkin, 15th
	Massachusetts	10	Ryan Donato, 56th
7	British Columbia	8	Sam Reinhart, 2nd
8	New York	6	Sonny Milano, 16th
9	Saskatchewan	5	Haydn Fleury, 7th
10	Illinois	4	Christian Dvorak, 58th
11	Wisconsin	3	Nick Schmaltz, 20th
	Colorado	3	Dominic Turgeon, 63rd
13	Manitoba	2	Travis Sanheim, 17th
	New Jersey	2	Anthony DeAngelo, 19th
	California	2	Thatcher Demko, 36th
	Ohio	2	Alex Nedeljkovic, 37th
	Pennsylvania	2	Sam Lafferty, 113th
18	Nova Scotia	1	Mason McDonald, 34th
	Missouri	1	Ryan MacInnis, 43rd
	North Dakota	1	Alex Schoenborn, 72nd
	Indiana	1	Blake Siebenaler, 77th
	North Carolina	1	Josh Wesley, 96th
	Newfoundland and Labrador	1	Clark Bishop, 127th
	New Hampshire	1	Joey Dudek, 152nd
	Delaware	1	Dwyer Tschantz, 202nd

== Draftees based on league ==
Rank	League	Picks	Teams in League	Picks per Team
1	OHL	41	20	2.05
2	WHL	37	22	1.7
3	USHL^{1}	35	17	2.06
4	QMJHL	17	18	0.9

Notes

1. In addition to the 35 players who played in the USHL during the 2013–14 season, 16 players were drafted who played in the USHL during the 2012–13 season and have moved on to the NCAA or other leagues.

== See also ==
- 2011–12 NHL transactions
- 2012–13 NHL transactions
- 2013–14 NHL transactions
- 2014–15 NHL transactions
- 2014–15 NHL season
- List of first overall NHL draft picks
- List of NHL players
