= Julius Vähätalo =

Finnish ice hockey player (born 1995)

- Born: 23 March 1995 (age 31) Vahto, Finland
- Height: 6 ft 5 in (196 cm)
- Weight: 192 lb (87 kg; 13 st 10 lb)
- Position: Forward
- Shoots: Left
- Mestis team Former teams: TUTO Hockey; TPS; Mikkelin Jukurit; IF Troja-Ljungby; HK 32 Liptovský Mikuláš
- NHL draft: 166th overall, 2014; Detroit Red Wings
- Playing career: 2013–present

Julius Vähätalo (born 23 March 1995) is a Finnish professional ice hockey forward, who is currently playing for TUTO Hockey of the Mestis.

Vähätalo was drafted 166th overall by Detroit Red Wings in the 2014 NHL entry draft.

== Playing career ==
During the 2013–14 season, Vähätalo was an assistant captain for HC TPS's Jr. team, where he recorded 18 goals and 21 assists in 33 games, as well as three goals in 18 games for HC TPS.

After spending the first four seasons of his professional career with TPS, Vähätalo left the club in signing a contract with fellow Liiga club, Mikkelin Jukurit, on 18 April 2017.

== International play ==
Vähätalo represented Finland at the 2015 World Junior Ice Hockey Championships, where he did not record any points in five games.

== Career statistics ==
=== Regular season and playoffs ===
			Regular season					Playoffs
Season	Team	League	GP	G	A	Pts	PIM	GP	G	A	Pts	PIM
2011–12	TPS	Jr. A	8	1	1	2	0	—	—	—	—	—
2012–13	TPS	Jr. A	8	0	4	4	2	—	—	—	—	—
2013–14	TPS	Jr. A	33	18	21	39	6	3	0	0	0	0
2013–14	TPS	Liiga	18	3	0	3	0	—	—	—	—	—
2014–15	TPS	Jr. A	12	7	9	16	6	12	7	6	13	0
2014–15	TPS	Liiga	36	1	1	2	8	—	—	—	—	—
2015–16	TPS	Jr. A	3	1	5	6	0	—	—	—	—	—
2015–16	TPS	Liiga	49	9	4	13	6	6	0	0	0	0
2016–17	TPS	Jr. A	7	0	4	4	0	—	—	—	—	—
2016–17	TPS	Liiga	45	3	4	7	8	4	0	0	0	12
2016–17	TUTO Hockey	Mestis	2	2	1	3	0	—	—	—	—	—
2017–18	Mikkelin Jukurit	Liiga	60	6	6	12	30	—	—	—	—	—
2018–19	Mikkelin Jukurit	Liiga	60	11	10	21	6	—	—	—	—	—
Liiga totals			268	33	25	58	58	10	0	0	0	12

=== International ===
Year	Team	Event	Result	GP	G	A	Pts	PIM
2015	Finland	WJC	7th	5	0	0	0	0
Junior totals				5	0	0	0	0
