= David Westlund =

Swedish ice hockey player

- Born: February 5, 1995 (age 31) Östersund, Sweden
- Height: 6 ft 3 in (191 cm)
- Weight: 207 lb (94 kg; 14 st 11 lb)
- Position: Defence
- Shoots: Left
- Div.1 team Former teams: Östersunds IK; Brynäs IF; Karlskrona HK
- NHL draft: 163rd overall, 2014; Arizona Coyotes
- Playing career: 2013–present

David Westlund (born February 5, 1995) is a Swedish professional ice hockey defenceman. He is currently playing with Östersunds IK of the Hockeyettan (Div.1). Westlund was selected by the Arizona Coyotes in the 6th round, 163rd overall, at the 2014 NHL entry draft.

Westlund made his Swedish Hockey League debut playing with Brynäs IF during the 2013–14 SHL season.

== Career statistics ==
=== Regular season and playoffs ===
| | | | Regular season | | | | | Playoffs |
| Season | Team | League | GP | G | A | Pts | PIM | GP | G | A | Pts | PIM |
|---|---|---|---|---|---|---|---|---|---|---|---|---|
| 2012–13 | Brynäs IF | J20 | 32 | 1 | 5 | 6 | 59 | 2 | 0 | 0 | 0 | 4 |
| 2013–14 | Brynäs IF | J20 | 33 | 5 | 5 | 10 | 61 | 7 | 0 | 2 | 2 | 10 |
| 2013–14 | Brynäs IF | SHL | 21 | 0 | 1 | 1 | 0 | — | — | — | — | — |
| 2014–15 | Brynäs IF | J20 | 12 | 4 | 4 | 8 | 41 | 3 | 1 | 3 | 4 | 4 |
| 2014–15 | Brynäs IF | SHL | 53 | 0 | 2 | 2 | 8 | 3 | 0 | 0 | 0 | 0 |
| 2015–16 | Karlskrona HK | J20 | 5 | 1 | 0 | 1 | 2 | — | — | — | — | — |
| 2015–16 | Karlskrona HK | SHL | 9 | 1 | 0 | 1 | 4 | — | — | — | — | — |
| 2016–17 | Timrå IK | Allsv | 11 | 0 | 1 | 1 | 8 | — | — | — | — | — |
| 2017–18 | Valbo HC | Div.1 | 26 | 4 | 10 | 14 | 39 | — | — | — | — | — |
| 2017–18 | Östersunds IK | Div.1 | 10 | 0 | 2 | 2 | 2 | 3 | 0 | 0 | 0 | 0 |
| SHL totals | | | 83 | 1 | 3 | 4 | 12 | 3 | 0 | 0 | 0 | 0 |

=== International ===
| Year | Team | Event | Result | GP | G | A | Pts | PIM |
|---|---|---|---|---|---|---|---|---|
| 2012 | Sweden | IH18 | 3rd place, bronze medalist(s) | 5 | 0 | 1 | 1 | 6 |
| Junior totals | | | | 5 | 0 | 1 | 1 | 6 |
