= Pontus Själin =

Swedish ice hockey player

- Born: 12 June 1996 (age 29) Östersund, Sweden
- Height: 183 cm (6 ft 0 in)
- Weight: 80 kg (176 lb; 12 st 8 lb)
- Position: Defence
- Shoots: Left
- SHL team Former teams: Luleå HF; Leksands IF
- NHL draft: 160th overall, 2014; Minnesota Wild
- Playing career: 2014–present

Pontus Själin (born 12 June 1996) is a Swedish ice hockey player. He is currently playing with Luleå HF organization in the Swedish Hockey League (SHL). Själin was selected by the Minnesota Wild in the sixth round (160th overall) of the 2014 NHL entry draft.

Själin made his Swedish Hockey League debut with Leksands IF during the 2014–15 SHL season. On 27 May 2015 Själin left Leksands in order to sign a two-year contract with fellow SHL competitors Luleå HF.

== Career statistics ==
			Regular season					Playoffs
Season	Team	League	GP	G	A	Pts	PIM	GP	G	A	Pts	PIM
2012–13	Östersunds IK	Div.1	1	1	0	1	0	—	—	—	—	—
2013–14	Östersunds IK	Div.1	21	3	1	4	8	4	0	0	0	0
2014–15	Leksands IF	J20	37	3	16	19	18	3	0	3	3	6
2014–15	Leksands IF	SHL	2	0	0	0	0	—	—	—	—	—
2014–15	Östersunds IK	Div.1	1	0	0	0	0	—	—	—	—	—
2015–16	Luleå HF	J20	7	2	1	3	4	—	—	—	—	—
2015–16	Luleå HF	SHL	25	0	0	0	2	1	0	0	0	0
2015–16	Asplöven HC	Allsv	21	0	3	3	4	10	1	1	2	2
2016–17	Luleå HF	J20	1	0	0	0	0	—	—	—	—	—
2016–17	Luleå HF	SHL	35	1	0	1	4	2	0	0	0	0
2016–17	IF Björklöven	Allsv	2	0	0	0	0	—	—	—	—	—
2017–18	Luleå HF	SHL	46	4	6	10	4	3	0	1	1	2
2018–19	Luleå HF	SHL	30	0	6	6	8	9	0	1	1	10
2019–20	Luleå HF	SHL	47	0	3	3	18	—	—	—	—	—
2020–21	Luleå HF	SHL	49	1	4	5	10	7	1	0	1	6
2021–22	Luleå HF	SHL	42	5	10	15	16	17	0	2	2	0
2022–23	Luleå HF	SHL	44	2	8	10	10	10	0	4	4	2
2023–24	Luleå HF	SHL	45	2	5	7	14	7	0	1	1	2
2024–25	Luleå HF	SHL	48	2	4	6	20	17	1	1	2	14
SHL totals			413	17	46	63	106	73	2	10	12	36

== Awards and honours ==
Award	Year
SHL
Le Mat Trophy (Luleå HF)	2025
