= Denis Kostin =

Russian ice hockey player (born 1995)

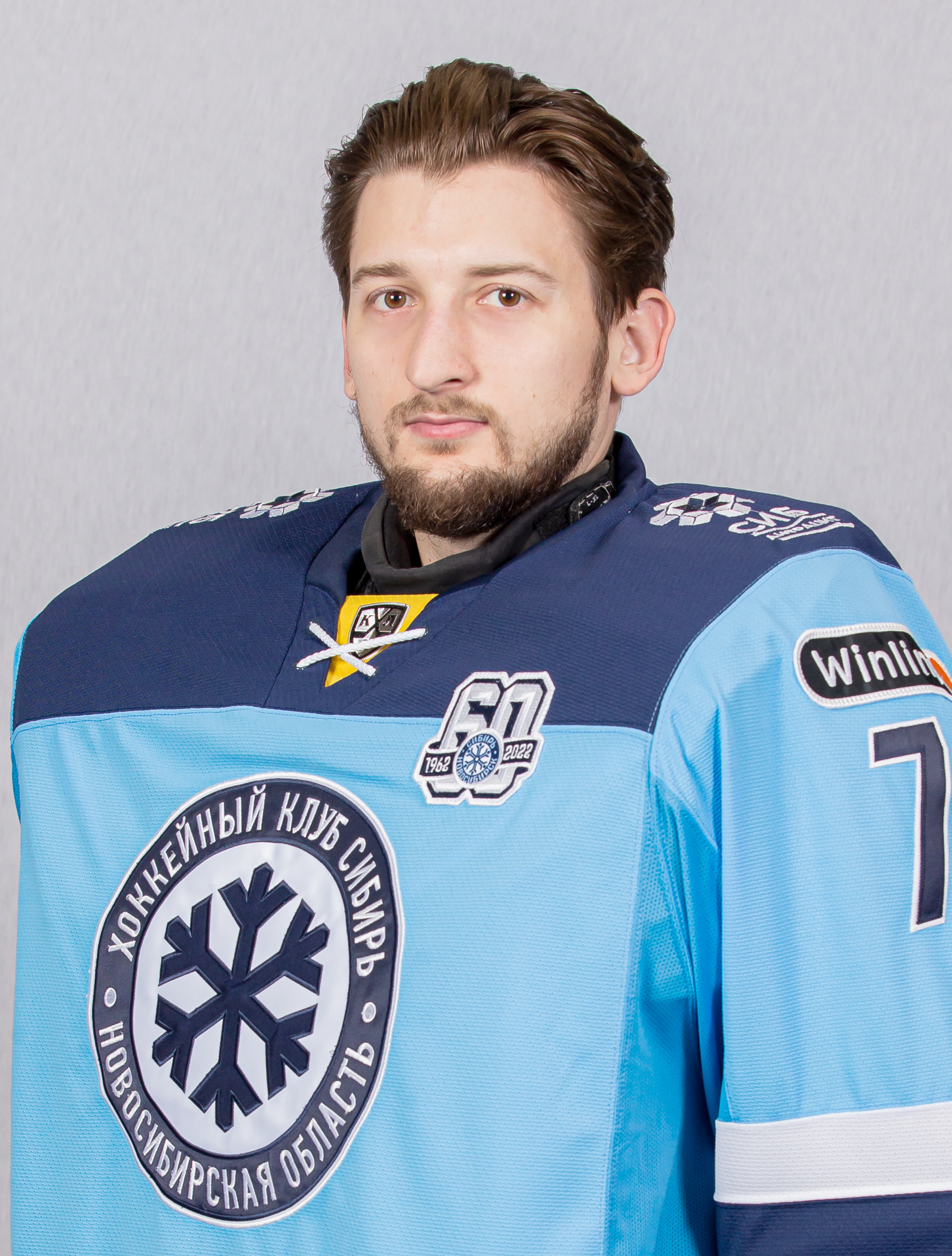
- Born: June 21, 1995 (age 30) Omsk, Russia
- Height: 6 ft 1 in (185 cm)
- Weight: 203 lb (92 kg; 14 st 7 lb)
- Position: Goaltender
- Catches: Left
- KHL team Former teams: Torpedo Nizhny Novgorod; Avangard Omsk; Sibir Novosibirsk
- Playing career: 2013–present

Denis Kostin (Russian: Денис Костин; born June 21, 1995) is a Russian professional ice hockey goaltender. He is currently playing with Torpedo Nizhny Novgorod of the Kontinental Hockey League (KHL).

Kostin made his Kontinental Hockey League debut playing with Avangard Omsk during the 2013–14 KHL season.
