= Samuel Ward (ice hockey) =

Swedish ice hockey player (1995-)

- Born: 19 January 1995 (age 31) Nyköping, Sweden
- Height: 6 ft 0 in (183 cm)
- Weight: 172 lb (78 kg; 12 st 4 lb)
- Position: Goaltender
- Catches: Left
- HockeyAllsvenskan team Former teams: Västerviks IK; Luleå HF; Sparta Warriors
- NHL draft: Undrafted
- Playing career: 2014–present

Samuel Ward (born 19 January 1995) is a Swedish professional ice hockey goaltender. He is currently playing with Västerviks IK in the Swedish HockeyAllsvenskan.

Ward made his professional and Swedish Hockey League debut playing with Luleå HF during the 2012–13 SHL season.
