= 1985–86 1. Slovenská národná hokejová liga season =

The 1985–86 1. Slovenská národná hokejová liga season was the 17th season of the 1. Slovenská národná hokejová liga, the second level of ice hockey in Czechoslovakia alongside the 1. Česká národní hokejová liga. 10 teams participated in the league, and VTJ Michalovce won the championship. ZVL Žilina was relegated.

== Regular season ==
	Club	GP	W	T	L	Goals	Pts
1.	VTJ Michalovce	44	27	9	8	219:111	63
2.	ZŤS Martin	44	25	7	12	205:133	57
3.	PS Poprad	44	24	6	14	191:135	54
4.	Spartak ZŤS Dubnica nad Váhom	44	23	6	15	168:142	52
5.	ZVL Skalica	44	23	6	15	154:146	52
6.	Plastika Nitra	44	21	8	15	164:143	50
7.	Iskra Smrečina Banská Bystrica	44	20	7	17	158:148	47
8.	ZTK Zvolen	44	19	5	20	180:172	43
9.	VTJ Topoľčany	44	18	4	22	182:158	40
10.	Partizán Liptovský Mikuláš	44	13	6	25	131:192	32
11.	ZPA Prešov	44	12	4	28	142:231	28
12.	ZVL Žilina	44	3	4	37	124:307	10
