= Miroslav Mosnár =

Slovak ice hockey player and coach

- Born: 10 August 1968 (age 58) Bratislava, Czechoslovakia
- Height: 181 cm (5 ft 11 in)
- Weight: 93 kg (205 lb; 14 st 9 lb)
- Position: Defense
- Shot: Left
- Played for: HC Slovan Bratislava; EV Zeltweg; MHC Martin; HC Pardubice; Newcastle Jesters; Alleghe; HK 36 Skalica; HC Meran/o; Cortina; Briançon
- Current coach: HOBA Bratislava U20
- Coached for: HC Slovan Bratislava U20; HK Martin; HK Spišská Nová Ves
- National team: Slovakia
- Playing career: 1988–2006
- Coaching career: 2011–present

Miroslav Mosnár (born 10 August 1968) is a Slovak ice hockey player and coach. He currently serves as head coach of the Slovak women's national under-18 ice hockey team and the HOBA Bratislava U20 team in the 1. liga juniorov, the second-tier men's under-20 league in Slovakia.

Mosnár represented Slovakia in the men's ice hockey tournament at the 1998 Winter Olympics.

== Career statistics ==
=== Regular season and playoffs ===
| | | | Regular season | | | | | Playoffs |
| Season | Team | League | GP | G | A | Pts | PIM | GP | G | A | Pts | PIM |
|---|---|---|---|---|---|---|---|---|---|---|---|---|
| 1988–89 | TJ Slovan OSCR Topoľčany | SVK.2 |
| 1989–90 | HC Slovan Bratislava | SVK.2 |
| 1990–91 | HC Slovan Bratislava | TCH | 34 | 4 | 0 | 4 | 30 | — | — | — | — | — |
| 1991–92 | HC Slovan Bratislava | TCH | 36 | 7 | 3 | 10 | | 2 | 0 | 0 | 0 |
| 1992–93 | HC Slovan Bratislava | TCH | 40 | 7 | 6 | 13 | | — | — | — | — | — |
| 1993–94 | HC Slovan Bratislava | SVK | 44 | 1 | 6 | 7 | | — | — | — | — | — |
| 1994–95 | EV Zeltweg | AUT | 27 | | | | 76 | — | — | — | — | — |
| 1995–96 | Martinskeho hokeja club | SVK | 48 | 13 | 9 | 22 | 116 | — | — | — | — | — |
| 1996–97 | HC Slovan Bratislava | SVK | 46 | 12 | 25 | 37 | 48 | — | — | — | — | — |
| 1997–98 | HC Slovan Bratislava | SVK | 46 | 10 | 14 | 24 | 56 | — | — | — | — | — |
| 1998–99 | HC Slovan Bratislava | SVK | 41 | 6 | 20 | 26 | 42 | 10 | 0 | 7 | 7 |
| 1999–2000 | HC Slovan Bratislava | SVK | 24 | 4 | 5 | 9 | 37 | — | — | — | — | — |
| 1999–2000 | HC IPB Pojišťovna Pardubice | ELH | 16 | 1 | 2 | 3 | 16 | 3 | 0 | 0 | 0 | 0 |
| 2000–01 | Newcastle Jesters | GBR | 48 | 5 | 13 | 18 | 50 | — | — | — | — | — |
| 2001–02 | Alleghe Hockey | ITA | 42 | 8 | 26 | 34 | 42 | 9 | 2 | 2 | 4 | 6 |
| 2002–03 | HK 36 Skalica | SVK | 25 | 1 | 8 | 9 | 40 | — | — | — | — | — |
| 2002–03 | HC Merano | ITA | 26 | 4 | 13 | 17 | 18 | — | — | — | — | — |
| 2003–04 | SG Cortina | ITA | 28 | 7 | 7 | 14 | 32 | 7 | 2 | 3 | 5 | 16 |
| 2004–05 | SG Cortina | ITA | 35 | 6 | 6 | 12 | 30 | 18 | 1 | 8 | 9 | 28 |
| 2005–06 | KLH Vajgar Jindřichův Hradec | CZE.2 | 11 | 0 | 2 | 2 | 16 | — | — | — | — | — |
| 2005–06 | Diables Rouges de Briançon | FRA | 13 | 2 | 4 | 6 | 34 | 4 | 1 | 0 | 1 | 8 |
| TCH totals | | | 110 | 18 | 9 | 27 | — | 2 | 0 | 0 | 0 | — |
| SVK totals | | | 274 | 47 | 87 | 134 | 339 | 10 | 0 | 7 | 7 | — |
| ITA totals | | | 131 | 25 | 52 | 77 | 122 | 34 | 5 | 13 | 18 | 50 |

=== International ===
| Year | Team | Event | GP | G | A | Pts | PIM |
|---|---|---|---|---|---|---|---|
| 1998 | Slovakia | OG | 4 | 0 | 0 | 0 | 6 |
| Senior totals | | | 4 | 0 | 0 | 0 | 6 |

"Miroslav Mosnar". Elite Prospects.
