= 1990–91 1. Slovenská národná hokejová liga season =

The 1990–91 1. Slovenská národná hokejová liga season was the 22nd season of the 1. Slovenská národná hokejová liga, the second level of ice hockey in Czechoslovakia alongside the 1. Česká národní hokejová liga. 12 teams participated in the league, and ŠKP PS Poprad won the championship and was promoted to the Czechoslovak First Ice Hockey League. Slávia Ekonóm Bratislava was relegated.

== Regular season ==
	Club	GP	W	T	L	Goals	Pts
1.	ŠKP PS Poprad	44	35	4	5	265:117	74
2.	Štart Spišská Nová Ves	44	29	6	9	197:106	64
3.	Iskra Smrečina Banská Bystrica	44	26	9	9	191:132	61
4.	ZPA Prešov	44	23	8	13	175:135	54
5.	VTJ Topoľčany	44	21	5	18	190:160	47
6.	HK 32 Liptovský Mikuláš	44	19	8	17	159:150	46
7.	Hutník ZŤS Martin	44	19	6	19	162:149	44
8.	Spartak ZŤS Dubnica nad Váhom	44	18	5	21	165:171	41
9.	Sparta ZVL Považská Bystrica	44	14	6	24	156:216	34
10.	ZTK Zvolen	44	12	5	27	135:198	29
11.	VTJ Michalovce	44	8	5	31	153:214	21
12.	Slávia Ekonóm Bratislava	44	5	3	36	137:337	13
