= 1992–93 1. Slovenská národná hokejová liga season =

The 1992–93 1. Slovenská národná hokejová liga season was the 24th and last season of the 1. Slovenská národná hokejová liga, the second level of ice hockey in Czechoslovakia alongside the 1. Česká národní hokejová liga. 12 teams participated in the league, and AC Nitra won the championship. The top six teams in the league were promoted to the Slovak Extraliga for the following season, while the bottom six teams joined the Slovak 1.Liga

== Regular season ==
	Club	GP	W	T	L	Goals	Pts
1.	AC Nitra	43	30	6	7	200:112	66
2.	HK 32 Liptovský Mikuláš	44	28	6	10	195:104	62
3.	Hutník ZŤS Martin	44	26	7	11	177:120	59
4.	ZPA Prešov	44	24	7	13	150:115	55
5.	ZTK Zvolen	44	22	5	17	171:147	49
6.	Štart Spišská Nová Ves	44	20	8	16	167:126	48
7.	Iskra Smrečina Banská Bystrica	44	21	6	17	183:151	48
8.	CAPEH Dubnica nad Váhom	44	20	4	20	164:170	44
9.	MEZ VTJ Michalovce	44	17	7	20	150:157	41
10.	VTJ Senica	44	8	8	28	135:235	24
11.	VTJ Topoľčany	43	6	7	30	105:206	19
12.	HK 31 Kežmarok	44	4	3	37	121:275	11

The game between AC Nitra and VTJ Topoľčany was stopped during the second period due to an explosion. The game was scheduled to be replayed, but it was eventually cancelled.
