= 1987–88 1. Slovenská národná hokejová liga season =

The 1987–88 1. Slovenská národná hokejová liga season was the 19th season of the 1. Slovenská národná hokejová liga, the second level of ice hockey in Czechoslovakia alongside the 1. Česká národní hokejová liga. 12 teams participated in the league, and TJ Plastika Nitra won the championship. TJ Gumárne 1. mája Púchov was relegated.

== Regular season ==
	Club	GP	W	T	L	Goals	Pts
1.	TJ Plastika Nitra	44	26	7	11	179:109	59
2.	PS Poprad	44	24	3	17	191:146	51
3.	Spartak ZŤS Dubnica nad Váhom	44	23	4	17	149:115	50
4.	ZPA Prešov	44	21	8	15	177:147	50
5.	ZŤS Martin	44	24	1	19	150:135	49
6.	Iskra Smrečina Banská Bystrica	44	21	3	20	133:128	45
7.	ZTK Zvolen	44	19	7	18	140:159	45
8.	VTJ Michalovce	44	20	4	20	174:162	44
9.	VTJ Topoľčany	44	21	1	22	148:154	43
10.	Partizán Liptovský Mikuláš	44	19	4	21	139:147	42
11.	ZVL Skalica	44	13	9	22	132:178	35
12.	TJ Gumárne 1. mája Púchov	44	6	3	35	113:245	15
