= 1984–85 1. Slovenská národná hokejová liga season =

The 1984–85 1. Slovenská národná hokejová liga season was the 16th season of the 1. Slovenská národná hokejová liga, the second level of ice hockey in Czechoslovakia alongside the 1. Česká národní hokejová liga. 10 teams participated in the league, and PS Poprad won the championship. Slávia Ekonóm Bratislava was relegated.

== Regular season ==
| | Club | GP | W | T | L | Goals | Pts |
|---|---|---|---|---|---|---|---|
| 1. | PS Poprad | 44 | 26 | 9 | 9 | 205:132 | 61 |
| 2. | Spartak ZŤS Dubnica nad Váhom | 44 | 25 | 8 | 11 | 165:115 | 58 |
| 3. | ZŤS Martin | 44 | 22 | 10 | 12 | 172:142 | 54 |
| 4. | VTJ Michalovce | 44 | 23 | 5 | 16 | 197:152 | 51 |
| 5. | ZVL Skalica | 44 | 20 | 10 | 14 | 158:138 | 50 |
| 6. | VTJ Topoľčany | 44 | 23 | 3 | 18 | 196:165 | 49 |
| 7. | Partizán Liptovský Mikuláš | 44 | 18 | 7 | 19 | 160:180 | 43 |
| 8. | ZTK Zvolen | 44 | 17 | 8 | 19 | 170:178 | 42 |
| 9. | TJ Plastika Nitra | 44 | 16 | 9 | 19 | 140:153 | 41 |
| 10. | Iskra Smrečina Banská Bystrica | 44 | 11 | 9 | 24 | 150:193 | 31 |
| 11. | ZPA Prešov | 44 | 10 | 8 | 26 | 128:200 | 28 |
| 12. | Slávia Ekonóm Bratislava | 44 | 8 | 4 | 32 | 159:252 | 20 |
