= Ľubomír Kolník =

Slovak ice hockey player

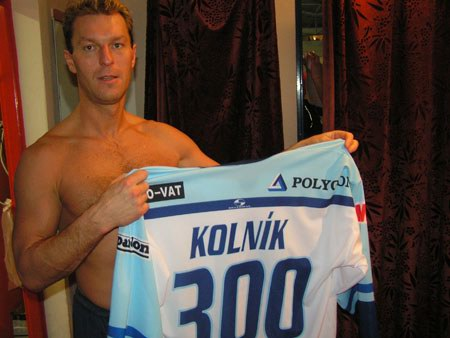
- Born: January 23, 1968 (age 58) Nitra, Czechoslovakia
- Height: 6 ft 0 in (183 cm)
- Weight: 194 lb (88 kg; 13 st 12 lb)
- Position: Right Wing
- Shot: Left
- Played for: HC Dukla Trenčín; Lukko; Kiekko-Espoo; HC Slovan Bratislava; HK Nitra; HKm Zvolen; HK 36 Skalica
- National team: Czechoslovakia and Slovakia
- NHL draft: 116th overall, 1990; New Jersey Devils
- Playing career: 1987–2009

Ľubomír Kolník (born January 23, 1968, in Nitra, Czechoslovakia) is a Slovak former professional ice hockey player.

== Career ==
Kolník began his career with HC Dukla Trenčín in the Czechoslovak Extraliga. Kolník was drafted 116th overall in the 1990 NHL entry draft by the New Jersey Devils but never played in the NHL. In 1992, he moved to Finland and played for Jokipojat of the I divisioona and eventually moved to Lukko in the SM-liiga. He returned to Dukla Trenčín in 1994 for one season before returning to the SM-liiga for Kiekko-Espoo.

Kolník returned to Slovakia in 1996 and signed with HC Slovan Bratislava and remained until 2001 when he joined HK Ardo Nitra. After one season he moved to HKm Zvolen, but left again after one season and returned to Nitra. He signed for HK 36 Skalica in 2008.

Kolník represented Czechoslovakia in the 1991 World Ice Hockey Championship. He then represented Slovakia following the dissolution of Czechoslovakia and played in five World Championships. He also played in the 1994 and 1998 Winter Olympics.

== Career statistics ==
=== Regular season and playoffs ===
			Regular season					Playoffs
Season	Team	League	GP	G	A	Pts	PIM	GP	G	A	Pts	PIM
1986–87	MHC Plastika Nitra	SVK.2	—	18	14	32	—	—	—	—	—	—
1987–88	ASVŠ Dukla Trenčín	TCH	42	14	8	22	10	—	—	—	—	—
1988–89	ASVŠ Dukla Trenčín	TCH	27	7	5	12	8	9	2	3	5	—
1989–90	ASVŠ Dukla Trenčín	TCH	53	27	35	62	15	—	—	—	—	—
1990–91	ASVŠ Dukla Trenčín	TCH	52	38	37	75	12	6	1	3	4	0
1991–92	ASVŠ Dukla Trenčín	TCH	37	19	12	31	—	12	7	11	18	—
1992–93	Jokipojat	FIN.2	44	46	38	84	26	6	1	3	4	10
1993–94	Jokipojat	FIN.2	22	23	17	40	14	—	—	—	—	—
1993–94	Lukko	SM-l	25	10	10	20	10	9	4	0	4	2
1994–95	HC Dukla Trenčín	SVK	36	31	23	54	24	9	10	3	13	12
1995–96	Kiekko-Espoo	SM-l	47	13	12	25	43	—	—	—	—	—
1996–97	HC Slovan Bratislava	SVK	48	34	29	63	12	—	—	—	—	—
1997–98	HC Slovan Bratislava	SVK	45	24	26	50	8	—	—	—	—	—
1998–99	HC Slovan Bratislava	SVK	48	27	27	54	10	—	—	—	—	—
1999–2000	HC Slovan Bratislava	SVK	63	33	26	59	34	—	—	—	—	—
2000–01	HC Slovan Bratislava	SVK	56	28	24	52	24	8	1	5	6	0
2001–02	MHC Nitra	SVK	52	24	10	34	22	—	—	—	—	—
2002–03	HKm Zvolen	SVK	54	24	26	50	20	9	3	1	4	2
2002–03	HKm Zvolen B	IEHL	1	0	0	0	0	—	—	—	—	—
2003–04	HKm Nitra	SVK	54	18	13	31	18	—	—	—	—	—
2004–05	HK Dynamax Nitra	SVK	53	19	18	37	31	5	2	1	3	0
2005–06	HK Dynamax Nitra	SVK	54	28	20	48	42	13	5	3	8	16
2006–07	HK Dynamax - Oil Nitra	SVK	54	22	19	41	62	6	1	2	3	2
2007–08	HK Ardo Nitra	SVK	54	12	13	25	73	—	—	—	—	—
2008–09	HK Ardo Nitra	SVK	10	1	3	4	6	—	—	—	—	—
2008–09	HK 36 Skalica	SVK	10	0	0	0	4	—	—	—	—	—
2008–09	HC Nové Zámky	SVK.2	13	11	9	20	34	—	—	—	—	—
TCH totals			211	115	87	202	—	27	11	16	27	—
SVK totals			691	325	277	602	390	50	22	15	37	32

=== International ===
Year	Team	Event	GP	G	A	Pts	PIM
1986	Czechoslovakia	EJC	—	—	—	—	—
1991	Czechoslovakia	CC	4	1	0	1	2
1991	Czechoslovakia	WC	10	2	1	3	0
1994	Slovakia	OG	8	4	1	5	2
1994	Slovakia	WC C	1	0	0	0	0
1995	Slovakia	WC B	7	6	5	11	0
1996	Slovakia	WCH	3	1	0	1	0
1996	Slovakia	WC	5	0	2	2	4
1997	Slovakia	WC	8	2	2	4	4
1998	Slovakia	OG	4	0	0	0	2
1999	Slovakia	WC	6	3	2	5	8
Senior totals			48	13	8	21	22
