= 1986–87 1. Slovenská národná hokejová liga season =

The 1986–87 1. Slovenská národná hokejová liga season was the 18th season of the 1. Slovenská národná hokejová liga, the second level of ice hockey in Czechoslovakia alongside the 1. Česká národní hokejová liga. 12 teams participated in the league, and TJ Plastika Nitra won the championship. Slávia Ekonóm Bratislava was relegated.

== Regular season ==
	Club	GP	W	T	L	Goals	Pts
1.	TJ Plastika Nitra	44	28	5	11	184:121	61
2.	Iskra Smrečina Banská Bystrica	44	24	5	15	158:115	53
3.	ZŤS Martin	44	22	8	14	150:132	52
4.	VTJ Michalovce	44	20	8	16	158:146	48
5.	PS Poprad	44	22	3	19	197:171	47
6.	Spartak ZŤS Dubnica nad Váhom	44	19	7	18	147:145	45
7.	VTJ Topoľčany	44	18	5	21	166:173	41
8.	ZVL Skalica	44	17	7	20	134:156	41
9.	ZTK Zvolen	44	17	4	23	130:158	38
10.	ZPA Prešov	44	17	2	25	150:202	36
11.	Partizán Liptovský Mikuláš	44	15	5	24	153:162	35
12.	Slávia Ekonóm Bratislava	44	14	3	27	155:201	31
