= Ľubomír Hurtaj =

Slovak ice hockey player

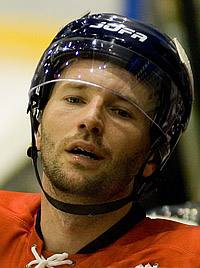
- Born: November 28, 1975 Topoľčany, Czechoslovakia
- Height: 5 ft 9 in (175 cm)
- Weight: 179 lb (81 kg; 12 st 11 lb)
- Position: Centre
- Shot: Left
- Played for: HC Prešov; HK Spišská Nová Ves; HK Nitra; HK Dukla Trenčín; HC Slovan Bratislava; HC Plzeň; HIFK; HC Karlovy Vary; Lausanne HC; EHC Wolfsburg; HC Vítkovice; MHC Martin; HKm Zvolen; SC Csíkszereda; Dunaújvárosi Acélbikák; HC Nové Zámky
- National team: Slovakia
- NHL draft: Undrafted
- Playing career: 1996–2016

Ľubomír Hurtaj (born 28 November 1975) is a Slovak former professional ice hockey player.

Hurtaj played in the Slovak Extraliga for HC Prešov, HK Spišská Nová Ves, HK Nitra, HK Dukla Trenčín, HC Slovan Bratislava, MHC Martin, HKm Zvolen and HC Nové Zámky. He also played in the Czech Extraliga for HC Plzeň, HC Karlovy Vary and HC Vítkovice, the SM-liiga for HIFK, the Nationalliga A for Lausanne HC and the Deutsche Eishockey Liga for EHC Wolfsburg.
