= Jozef Stümpel =

Slovak professional ice hockey centre (born 1972)

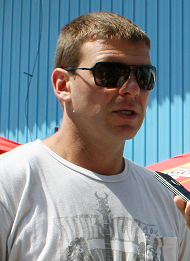
- Stümpel in 2009
- Born: 20 July 1972 (age 54) Nitra, Czechoslovakia
- Height: 6 ft 3 in (191 cm)
- Weight: 222 lb (101 kg; 15 st 12 lb)
- Position: Centre
- Shot: Right
- Played for: MHk 32 Liptovský Mikuláš; HC Dukla Trenčín; Kärpät; Spartak Moscow; Dinamo Minsk; Barys Astana; Florida Panthers; HC Slavia Praha; HC Slovan Bratislava; Los Angeles Kings; Kölner EC; Boston Bruins; HK Nitra; HK Indians Žiar nad Hronom
- National team: Slovakia
- NHL draft: 40th overall, 1991; Boston Bruins
- Playing career: 1991–2024

Jozef Stümpel (born 20 July 1972) is a Slovak former professional ice hockey centre. He played in the National Hockey League (NHL) with the Boston Bruins, Los Angeles Kings, and Florida Panthers between 1992 and 2008. Internationally Stümpel played for the Slovak national team at several tournaments, including the 2002, 2006, and 2010 Winter Olympics, and eight World Championships, winning a gold in 2002.

== Playing career ==
Stümpel was selected in the second round, 40th overall, by the Boston Bruins in the 1991 NHL Entry draft, and immediately joined the Bruins organization. Prior to the 2004–05 NHL lockout season, Stümpel had played for only two clubs, the Bruins and the Los Angeles Kings. For the 2005–06 season, Stümpel joined the Florida Panthers.

Stümpel was placed on unconditional waivers on June 27, 2008, and Florida decided to buy out his contract.

On May 4, 2011, Stümpel moved from the Kontinental Hockey League (KHL)'s Dinamo Minsk to Spartak Moscow.

A long-time friend of Žigmund Pálffy since the beginning of their professional careers, they were often line-mates on the Slovak national team.

In season 2023/2024 he played three games for HC Levice, in 3rd ice hockey League in Slovakia.

== Awards ==
- Boston Bruins' E.C. Dufresne Trophy as the best player on home ice in 1996–97

== Career statistics ==
=== Regular season and playoffs ===
			Regular season					Playoffs
Season	Team	League	GP	G	A	Pts	PIM	GP	G	A	Pts	PIM
1989–90	MHC Plastika Nitra	SVK-2	38	12	11	23	—	—	—	—	—	—
1990–91	AC/HC Nitra	CSSR	49	23	22	45	14	—	—	—	—	—
1991–92	Kölner EC	GER	33	19	18	37	35	4	1	1	2	0
1991–92	Boston Bruins	NHL	4	1	0	1	0	—	—	—	—	—
1992–93	Boston Bruins	NHL	13	1	3	4	4	—	—	—	—	—
1992–93	Providence Bruins	AHL	56	31	61	92	26	6	4	4	8	0
1993–94	Boston Bruins	NHL	59	8	15	23	14	13	1	7	8	4
1993–94	Providence Bruins	AHL	17	5	12	17	4	—	—	—	—	—
1994–95	Kölner Haie	DEL	25	16	23	39	18	—	—	—	—	—
1994–95	Boston Bruins	NHL	44	5	13	18	8	5	0	0	0	0
1995–96	Boston Bruins	NHL	76	18	36	54	14	5	1	2	3	0
1996–97	Boston Bruins	NHL	78	21	55	76	14	—	—	—	—	—
1997–98	Los Angeles Kings	NHL	77	21	58	79	53	4	1	2	3	2
1998–99	Los Angeles Kings	NHL	64	13	21	34	10	—	—	—	—	—
1999–00	Los Angeles Kings	NHL	57	17	41	58	10	4	0	4	4	8
2000–01	HC Slovan Bratislava	SVK	9	2	4	6	16	—	—	—	—	—
2000–01	Los Angeles Kings	NHL	63	16	39	55	14	13	3	5	8	10
2001–02	Los Angeles Kings	NHL	9	1	4	5	4	—	—	—	—	—
2001–02	Boston Bruins	NHL	72	7	46	53	14	6	0	2	2	0
2002–03	Boston Bruins	NHL	78	14	37	51	12	5	0	2	2	0
2003–04	Los Angeles Kings	NHL	64	8	29	37	16	—	—	—	—	—
2004–05	HC Slavia Praha	CZE	52	13	26	39	39	7	4	2	6	10
2005–06	Florida Panthers	NHL	74	15	37	52	26	—	—	—	—	—
2006–07	Florida Panthers	NHL	73	23	34	57	22	—	—	—	—	—
2007–08	Florida Panthers	NHL	52	7	13	20	10	—	—	—	—	—
2008–09	Barys Astana	KHL	45	10	25	35	65	3	0	1	1	0
2009–10	Barys Astana	KHL	54	13	39	52	26	3	1	0	1	0
2010–11	Dinamo Minsk	KHL	45	12	16	28	14	7	0	5	5	4
2011–12	Spartak Moscow	KHL	21	1	7	8	8	—	—	—	—	—
2011–12	HK Nitra	SVK	2	0	2	2	0	—	—	—	—	—
2011–12	Kärpät	FIN	18	1	8	9	2	9	2	5	7	6
2012–13	HK Nitra	SVK	52	13	37	50	6	9	1	8	9	0
2013–14	HK Nitra	SVK	54	16	51	67	12	16	4	11	15	16
2014–15	HK Nitra	SVK	49	20	31	51	8	12	6	11	17	4
2015–16	HK Nitra	SVK	40	2	17	19	10	—	—	—	—	—
2015–16	HC Dukla Trenčín	SVK	7	2	2	4	0	5	0	0	0	2
2016–17	MHk 32 Liptovský Mikuláš	SVK	46	5	12	17	12	—	—	—	—	—
2017–18	HK 96 Nitra	SVK-3	—	—	—	—	—
2023–24	Slovak 3.liga	HC Levice	3	1	1	2	-1	—	—	—	—	—
SVK totals			259	60	156	216	64	42	11	30	41	22
NHL totals			957	196	481	677	245	55	6	24	30	24

=== International ===
Medal record

Representing Slovakia

World Championships
Gold medal – first place	2002 Sweden	
Bronze medal – third place	2003 Finland	

Year	Team	Event	GP	G	A	Pts	PIM
1990	Czechoslovakia	EJC	6	1	3	4	4
1991	Czechoslovakia	WJC	7	4	4	8	2
1996	Slovakia	WCH	3	0	0	0	0
1997	Slovakia	WC	8	2	1	3	4
1998	Slovakia	WC	4	1	2	3	6
2002	Slovakia	OLY	2	2	1	3	0
2002	Slovakia	WC	3	0	1	1	4
2003	Slovakia	WC	9	4	11	15	0
2004	Slovakia	WCH	4	0	0	0	2
2004	Slovakia	WC	9	1	2	3	2
2005	Slovakia	WC	7	0	7	7	6
2006	Slovakia	OLY	3	0	0	0	0
2010	Slovakia	OLY	7	1	4	5	0
2011	Slovakia	WC	6	2	1	3	2
2013	Slovakia	WC	4	0	0	0	2
Junior totals			13	5	7	12	6
Senior totals			69	13	30	43	28

== Awards and honours ==
Award	Year
Slovak Extraliga
Playoffs MVP	2014

== See also ==
- Slovaks in the NHL
