= HK Nitra =

Ice hockey team

- Nickname: Corgoni
- City: Nitra, Slovakia
- League: Slovak Extraliga
- Founded: 1925; 101 years ago
- Home arena: Nitra Aréna (capacity 3,600)
- Colours: Prussian blue, Columbia blue, white
- General manager: Tomáš Chrenko
- Head coach: Erik Čaládi
- Captain: Branislav Mezei
- Website: www.hknitra.sk

Hokejový klub Nitra (English: Hockey Club Nitra), abbreviated as HK Nitra, is a professional ice hockey club based in the city of Nitra, Slovakia. The club competes in the Slovak Extraliga and plays its home games at Nitra Aréna.

The club was founded in 1925, making it one of the oldest ice hockey clubs in Slovakia. It has also competed in the Czechoslovak top division, although it spent most of its history in the second tier of Czechoslovak ice hockey. In 1993, it was one of the founding teams of Slovakia's top-level ice hockey league.

HK Nitra have won the Slovak ice hockey championship three times. The club has also won the second tier of Slovak ice hockey once. In addition, it won the Czechoslovak First Slovak National Ice Hockey League five times, which was the second tier of ice hockey in Czechoslovakia. In the 2022–23 season, the club also won the IIHF Continental Cup.

== History ==
=== Early years (1925-1957) ===
Ice hockey began to develop in the city of Nitra between 1924 and 1926. Initially, however, the city was home to bandy, which was introduced by Russian émigré Šapošnikov. In December 1925, local enthusiasts founded the city's first ice hockey club, AC Nitra. From that point onwards, ice hockey was played within the club. At that time, the first ice hockey matches in Nitra were played during the winter months on natural ice in Sihoť Park, where there were numerous suitable frozen bodies of water. The playing surface was marked out with low wooden boards, only a few centimetres high. Later, a permanent site for an ice hockey rink was established approximately on the site of the present-day football stadium in Nitra. At the time, the club's players wore a large letter N on their chests, which served as the club's emblem.

AC Nitra played its first ice hockey match on 20 December 1925 in Banská Bystrica, where the local club had invited the team to play a match. The Banská Bystrica club's officials also provided AC Nitra's players with their first set of ice hockey equipment. Pavol Duboviczky was the chairman of AC Nitra's ice hockey section, while the team consisted of Pavol Duboviczky, Gejza Čulák, Szatmáry, brothers Viliam and Alexander Gond, Karol Máčik and Štefan Valent. The club's early development was adversely affected by a series of natural disasters. In 1928, a fire destroyed the club's equipment, while in 1931 and 1937, the Nitra River overflowed its banks, flooding the club's facilities and destroying its equipment. In the 1931–32 season, the club competed in an official league for the first time. In the 1933–34 season, AC Nitra won the Tatra Cup. In that season, the club won the West Slovak County League title.

Between 1945 and 1976, the club underwent several name changes, being known as Sokol, Komunálny podnik, Spojené závody, Slavoj, Slovan and Štart. In the early 1950s, the club was renamed DŠO Slavoj Nitra. In the second half of the 1950s, the club was renamed TJ Slovan Nitra. In 1955, construction began on an outdoor ice hockey stadium with an artificial ice rink on the site of the original football stadium. The new ice hockey stadium effectively swapped places with the football stadium, as a new football stadium was built on the site of the original ice hockey rink. The two sports grounds were located immediately next to each other. The new outdoor ice hockey stadium, featuring an artificial ice rink and a refrigeration plant, was completed in 1957. Steel prefabricated stands for spectators were added to the stadium.

=== The first seasons in the second tier (1958-1978) ===
In the 1957–58 season, the club finished second in Group G of the regional competition and was promoted to the second tier of the Czechoslovak league for the first time. In the 1958–59 season, the club made its debut in the second tier of the Czechoslovak ice hockey league, finishing 11th and second-to-last in Group B and being relegated back to the regional competition. In the following season, the club won Group G of its regional competition and returned to the second tier. Until the mid-1970s, the club regularly alternated between the second and third tiers of Czechoslovak ice hockey.

In the early 1960s, the club was renamed TJ Štart Nitra. During this period, a second ice hockey team, VTJ Dukla Nitra (Note: In the 1966–67 season, VTJ Dukla Nitra won Group D of the second tier and advanced to the promotion group for the Czechoslovak top division. However, the team finished fourth and last in the group and failed to earn promotion to the top division. In the 1967–68 season, VTJ Dukla Nitra finished last in Group D of the second tier and was relegated. Shortly afterwards, the club ceased operations and was dissolved.), was also established in Nitra. In the 1962–63 season, the club was even promoted to the second tier. While the club was repeatedly promoted to and relegated from the second tier during this period, VTJ Dukla Nitra established itself as a regular second-tier team for several seasons. From the 1965–66 season onwards, the club was known as TJ AC Nitra again.

In 1973, the roof over the ice hockey stadium was completed, giving the arena its current appearance. The second tier of Czechoslovak ice hockey was restructured and divided into two regional sections based on the country's territorial division. The Slovak section was known as the First Slovak National Ice Hockey League. The club did not return to the second tier on a permanent basis until the 1975–76 season, by which time it was known as TJ Plastika Nitra. The club finished in mid-table. That season, the club was coached by former Czechoslovakia international Jozef Golonka. During this period, Ján Filc, who later became head coach of the Slovak national ice hockey team, joined the club as a goaltender and remained with the team for the next ten seasons.

=== First major successes (1979-1992) ===
In the 1978–79 season, the club finished second. In the following seasons, the club regularly finished near the top of the second tier, never finishing lower than fourth. In the 1983–84 season, it achieved the greatest success in its history up to that point by winning the First Slovak National Ice Hockey League by five points ahead of the runners-up. This was followed by a promotion playoff for a place in the top division, in which Plastika Nitra faced TJ Škoda Plzeň and TJ Poldi SONP Kladno. The club failed to win any of its matches and was not promoted to the top division. The club built on this success in the 1986–87 season, when it won the First Slovak National Ice Hockey League again. Plastika Nitra then entered the promotion playoff for the top division, facing TJ Poldi SONP Kladno, but lost the series 0–3. In the 1986–87 season, one of the league's future leading scorers, Ľubomír Kolník, also made his debut for the club. Plastika Nitra also won the First Slovak National Ice Hockey League in the following season. In the promotion playoff for the top division, the club faced TJ Vítkovice, but again lost the series 0–3. The club also reached the promotion playoff the following season, but once again failed to earn promotion.

Jozef Stümpel (left) and Žigmund Pálffy playing for AC Nitra during the 1990–91 season

The club finally achieved promotion in the 1989–90 season. Although it finished second in the First Slovak National Ice Hockey League, it qualified for the promotion playoff, where it succeeded for the first time and earned promotion to the Czechoslovak top division for the first time in its history. In the 1990–91 season, the club changed its name to TJ AC Nitra. However, its first season in the top division was unsuccessful, as it finished 13th and second-to-last and was relegated. The season nevertheless saw the emergence of players such as Žigmund Pálffy and Jozef Stümpel, who began their professional careers with the club. Pálffy recorded 50 points in 50 games, while Stümpel scored 45 points in 49 games, placing both among the league's leading scorers. Both players later played in the National Hockey League. Other future Slovak internationals, including Jozef Daňo, Jaroslav Török and Peter Oremus, also played for the club during the season.

In the following season, the club won the First Slovak National Ice Hockey League, finishing twelve points ahead of the runners-up. In the promotion playoff for the top division, the club lost the series 1–3 to HC Motor České Budějovice. The club's participation in Czechoslovak ice hockey competitions ended with the First Slovak National Ice Hockey League, whose final season it won, securing a place in the inaugural season of Slovakia's top ice hockey league. Notable players for the club during this period included Ivan Hrtús and Martin Miklík. Future Slovak internationals Dušan Milo and Juraj Štefanka also began their careers with the club during this period.

=== The club since the establishment of Slovakia (1993–2011) ===
Following the dissolution of Czechoslovakia and the establishment of its successor states, an independent Slovak top-level ice hockey league was established. The club, by then known as HC Nitra, competed in its inaugural season. It finished fifth, placing it in the middle of the league table. The brothers Miroslav Štefanka and Juraj Štefanka, who would later become key players for the team, also made their debuts for the club that season. The following season, however, was less successful, as the club finished second-to-last, just two points ahead of the bottom team, which was relegated. Young player Ivan Čiernik also made his debut for the team that season; he later went on to play in the National Hockey League. In the 1995–96 season, the club finished sixth and qualified for the playoffs. However, HC Nitra were eliminated in the first round by Martimex ZŤS Martin. Another product of the club's youth system, Andrej Kmeč, also made his debut for the club that season. The following season, the club competed under the name MHC Nitra. It finished ninth and second-to-last in the regular season and was forced to play a relegation playoff to retain its place in the top division. The club won the playoff and retained its place in the league. Youth products Tomáš Chrenko and Miroslav Kováčik made their debuts for the club that season, while future Slovakia international Pavol Rybár was the team's goaltender. Martin Miklík scored 60 points in 50 games, finishing as the league's fifth-highest scorer that season.

In the 1997–98 season, the club finished second-to-last and failed to qualify for the playoffs. Future NHL player Miroslav Zálešák and later Slovakia international Ľubomír Hurtaj also played for the club that season. In the 1998–99 season, the club finished bottom of the regular-season table. It subsequently had to play a relegation playoff to retain its place in the Extraliga, but was unsuccessful and, for the first time since the establishment of the independent Slovak league, was relegated to the second tier. Despite the team's struggles, Martin Miklík recorded 55 points in 50 games. Following relegation, the club's leading players left, giving greater opportunities to younger players. Tomáš Chrenko, Miroslav Kováčik and Andrej Kmeč became the team's leading scorers. Future Slovakia international Roman Kukumberg also played for the club during this period. The club spent only two seasons in the second tier, finishing second in the 2000–01 season and earning promotion back to the top division. Despite earning promotion to the top division, the club's leading scorers from the previous seasons left the team. As a result, the club finished bottom of the regular-season table in the 2001–02 season. In the subsequent relegation playoff, it lost 2–4 in games to HK Spišská Nová Ves. The season nevertheless saw the return of youth product Ľubomír Kolník, who became the club's leading scorer that season.

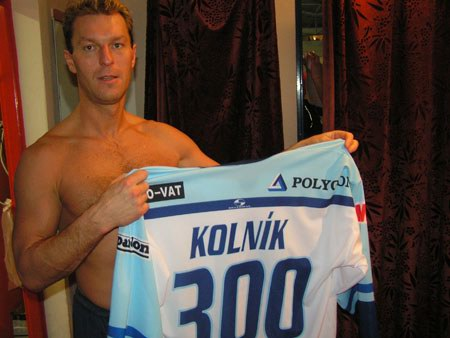
The photograph shows club player Ľubomír Kolník with a jersey commemorating his 300th goal in the Slovak Extraliga. Kolník is a product of HK Nitra's youth system and returned to the club in the early 2000s. He scored 318 goals in 681 games in the Slovak Extraliga and 115 goals in 211 games in the Czechoslovak top division.

After just one season in the second tier, the club returned to the Extraliga. In the 2003–04 season, the club competed under the name HKm Nitra and finished ninth and second-to-last. In addition to Ľubomír Kolník, former Slovakia international Róbert Pukalovič also played for the club. During the 2004–05 season, the NHL lockout brought several National Hockey League players back to the Slovak Extraliga, raising the overall quality of the competition. No National Hockey League players joined HKm Nitra, but the club nevertheless enjoyed a much-improved season, finishing fifth in the regular season. The only teams ahead of Nitra were those featuring National Hockey League players. In the playoffs, the club was eliminated in the first round by HC Košice. Ľubomír Kolník remained the team's leading scorer. Several former youth players also returned to the club, including Tomáš Chrenko, Miroslav Štefanka, Andrej Kmeč and Dušan Milo. Former Slovakia internationals Vladimír Vlk and Jaroslav Török also played for the club. Based on their strong performances, Jozef Kováčik and Andrej Kollár later earned call-ups to the Slovak national team. Czech goaltender Michal Fikrt was the team's starting goaltender.

The 2005–06 season was played without NHL players. The club also incorporated the name of its main sponsor into its name, becoming HK Dynamax Nitra. That season, the club achieved the greatest success in its history up to that point by winning the Extraliga regular season for the first time. In the playoffs, it lost 2–4 in games to MsHK Žilina in the semi-finals. The club finished third overall and won its first medal. The team was coached by Czech coach Antonín Stavjaňa, who was dismissed during the playoffs after reportedly negotiating with rival club HC Slovan Bratislava over his future position while the playoffs were still underway. That season, the club was strengthened by the return of another former youth player, Miroslav Kováčik. Czech goaltender Vlastimil Lakosil also joined the club. In the following season, the club changed its name to HK Dynamax-Oil Nitra. The club struggled, finishing seventh in the regular season. It was eliminated by HKm Zvolen in the first round of the playoffs. The club changed its name twice more within a short period, adopting the names HK Ardo Nitra and HC K'CERO Nitra after its main sponsors. That season, Latvian goaltender and former NHL player Artūrs Irbe made six appearances for the club. However, his time in Nitra was unsuccessful, and his contract was terminated following a series of poor performances. In contrast, youth product Branislav Konrád established himself as the club's first-choice goaltender.

=== The club's golden era (2010–present) ===
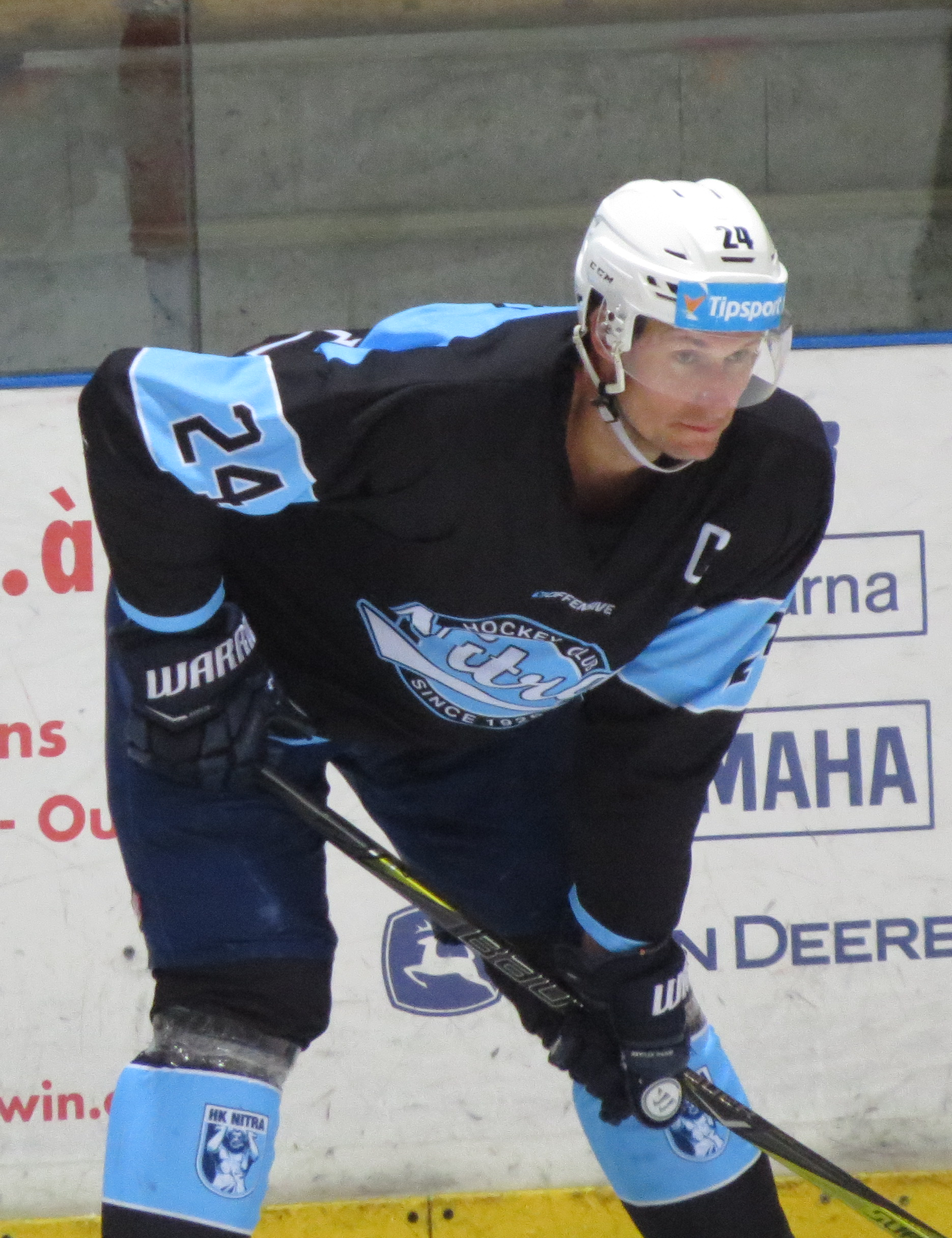
The photograph shows Branislav Mezei wearing an HK Nitra jersey inspired by the club's jerseys from the 1970s. Mezei is a product of HK Nitra's youth system. He returned to the club in the 2014–15 season after spells in the NHL and other European leagues. He was a member of the team for all three of the club's championship-winning seasons. He has served as team captain since the 2016–17 season.

Since 2010, the club has been known as HK Nitra. In the 2011–12 season, the club's most famous youth product, Jozef Stümpel, returned for two games after ending his NHL career. He returned permanently the following season, 2012–13, which saw an improvement in the club's fortunes as Nitra finished third in the regular season. In the subsequent playoffs, HK Nitra lost 1–4 in games to HC Košice in the semi-finals. The club therefore finished third overall, matching its best-ever result from the 2005–06 season. Antonín Stavjaňa was once again the team's head coach. In the following season, the club finished second in the regular season. In the subsequent playoffs, it reached the final for the first time in its history, where it lost to HC Košice. Despite the defeat, HK Nitra achieved the best result in its history. Jozef Stümpel and Roman Tománek were the league's leading scorers. In the 2014–15 season, HK Nitra again finished second in the regular season. However, the club was eliminated by HC ’05 Banská Bystrica in the semi-finals of the playoffs, finishing third overall. The club had three players among the Extraliga's top ten scorers that season. In the 2015–16 season, the club also competed in the Champions Hockey League, where it faced Skellefteå AIK and HC Bílí Tygři Liberec, earning just one point.

In 2015, former club player Miroslav Kováčik became the club's new president, while another former player, Tomáš Chrenko, was appointed head of youth development. Chrenko subsequently became the club's general manager. The club's strong run of form culminated in the 2015–16 season, when HK Nitra finished second in the regular season before reaching the final of the playoffs. There, it defeated HC ’05 Banská Bystrica 4–2 in games to win its first-ever league championship, marking the greatest achievement in the club's history. In the following season, HK Nitra competed in the Champions Hockey League again, this time with greater success. The club earned nine points in the group stage and advanced to the knockout stage, where it faced HC Škoda Plzeň and Stavanger Oilers in the group. In the subsequent playoffs, HK Nitra faced Vítkovice Steel, losing the series 0–2.

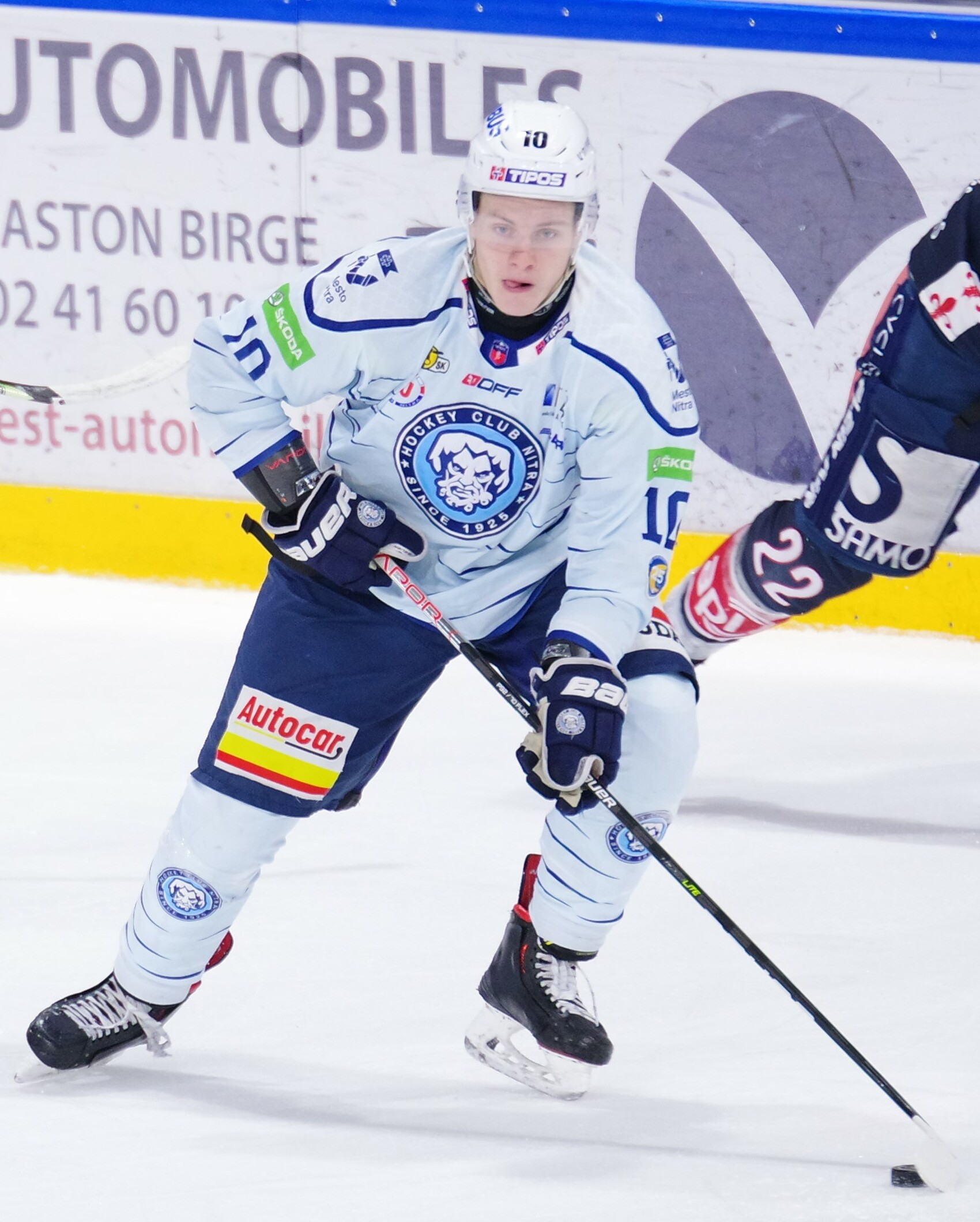
Adam Sýkora in an HK Nitra jersey. He was selected in the NHL Entry Draft in 2022. During this period, the club developed several players who were subsequently selected in the NHL Entry Draft.

Over the next three seasons, the club finished second twice and third once. This was followed by two less successful seasons, in which the club finished in mid-table. In the 2021–22 season, HK Nitra finished third in the regular season and reached the playoff final, where it lost 2–4 in games to HC Slovan Bratislava. In the 2022–23 season, the club competed in the IIHF Continental Cup, which it went on to win. Šimon Nemec also played for the club through the 2021–22 season, before being selected second overall by the NHL's New Jersey Devils in the 2022 NHL Entry Draft. In the same draft, another Nitra player, Adam Sýkora, was selected 63rd overall by the New York Rangers. In 2023, another player from the club, Juraj Pekarčík, was selected in the NHL Entry Draft. Another success came in the 2023–24 season. HK Nitra finished only eighth in the regular season and had to enter the playoffs through the preliminary round, where it eliminated HK Dukla Trenčín. In the first round of the playoffs, Nitra defeated HK Poprad 4–2 in games, followed by a 4–2 semi-final victory over HK Dukla Michalovce. Despite entering the playoffs as a major underdog, the club reached the final, where it swept HK Spišská Nová Ves 4–0 in games to win its second league championship. Antonín Stavjaňa was once again the team's head coach. The club also enjoyed a successful 2024–25 season. HK Nitra finished third in the regular season and reached the playoff final, where it lost to HC Košice in Game 7 in overtime. Nitra had trailed 1–3 in the series, but fought back to level the series before ultimately losing the deciding game.

During the 2025–26 season, HK Nitra celebrated the 100th anniversary of its founding. Several new players were brought in with the aim of winning the league championship as part of the centenary celebrations. Slovakia internationals Michal Krištof and Matej Paulovič returned to the club, while other Slovakia internationals, including Sebastian Čederle and Samuel Buček, also played for Nitra. The team's captain remained former NHL player and club youth product Branislav Mezei. Andrej Kmeč served as head coach that season. The club therefore entered the season as one of the favourites to win the championship. Nitra won the regular season by a five-point margin. In the subsequent playoffs, HK Nitra reached the final, where it faced its main rival, HC Slovan Bratislava. Nitra trailed 1–3 in the series, but fought back to level it at 3–3. The club then won the decisive Game 7 at home in overtime to claim its third league championship. In the 2026 NHL Entry Draft, club players Adam Nemec (Note: In January 2026, Adam Nemec transferred from HK Nitra to the OHL's Sudbury Wolves.) and Tomáš Chrenko were selected.

== Team information ==
=== Logo and uniforms ===
Club crest from the 1960s.

Club crest used in the 2000s.

Club crest used for several seasons after 2010

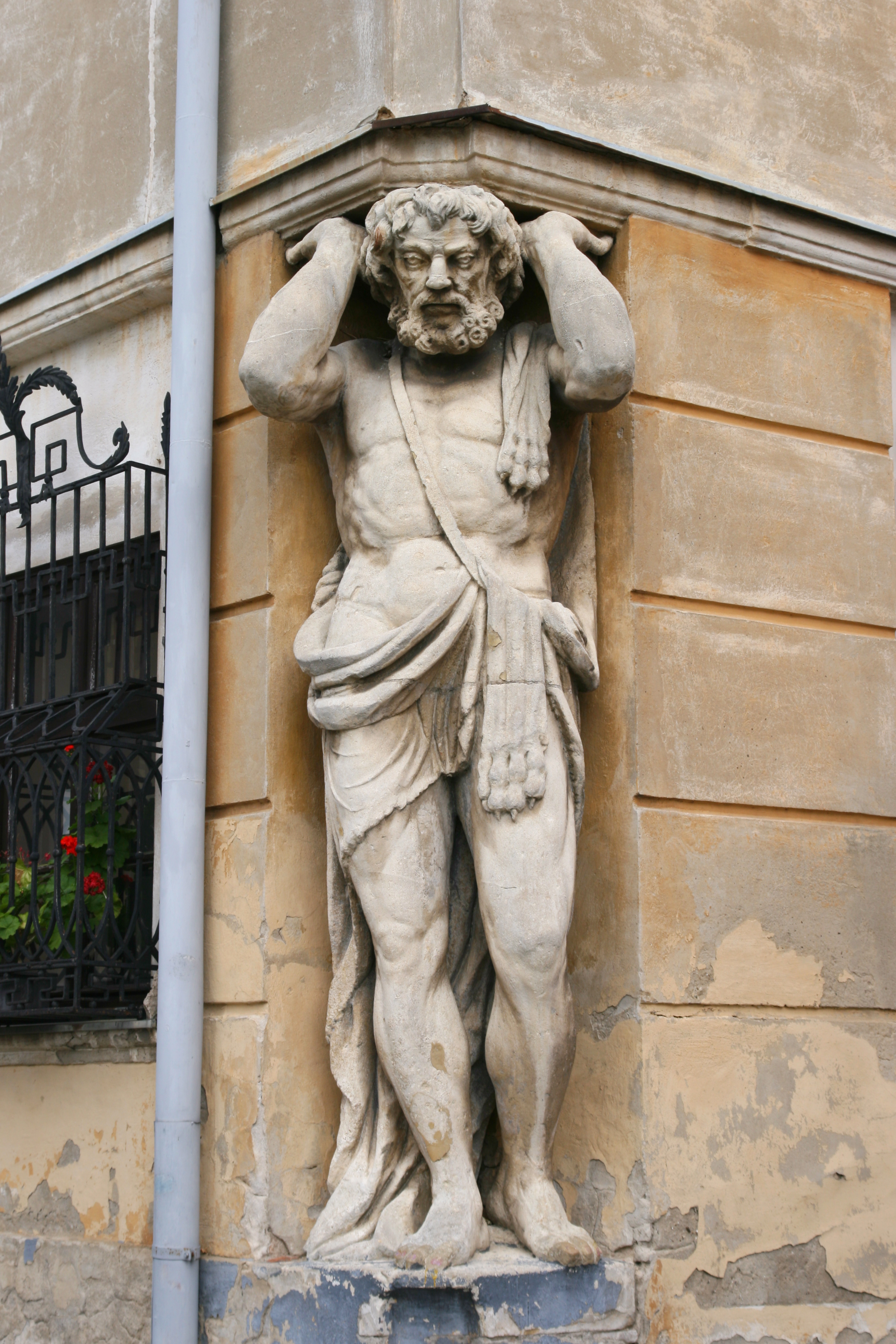
The photograph shows the statue of Atlas, popularly known as Corgoň, in Nitra. The statue is one of the symbols of the city of Nitra and was incorporated into the club's crest.

The club's colours are blue, light blue and white, and they have remained unchanged throughout its history. They are derived from the coat of arms of the city of Nitra, which features the colour blue. The club crest has evolved over time since the club's foundation, with changes generally coinciding with changes to the club's name. The first crest consisted solely of the letter N. It was used after the club's foundation throughout the 1920s, 1930s and 1940s. During the club's time under the name AC Nitra, its crest was blue and white and featured the large letters “AC”. In the 1970s, the club was renamed TJ Plastika Nitra. Plastika was a chemical manufacturing company based in Nitra and became the club's principal sponsor. During this period, the club initially used the large word “Nitra” on its jerseys as its emblem. It later adopted the Plastika company's logo, incorporating it into a new club crest featuring the name “TJ Plastika Nitra” alongside the company's logo.

In the 1990s, the club changed its name to HC Nitra, and the club crest was redesigned once again. This time, it featured a silhouette of Nitra Castle combined with a hockey puck, two crossed hockey sticks and the name “HC Nitra”. The crest was divided into two halves, one blue and the other white. Stars were featured on the lower part of the jerseys. In the 21st century, the club has changed its crest several times. In the early 2000s, the club initially adopted the coat of arms of the city of Nitra, which it modified for use as its own crest.

The club subsequently decided to redesign its crest once again, replacing the coat of arms of the city of Nitra with an image of a European bison (Known as “Zubor” in Slovak), the largest free-roaming wild animal in Slovakia. The club continued to use this crest after changing its name to HK Nitra. Whenever the club's name was changed to include the name of a main sponsor, the sponsor's name was also added to the club crest. In 2008, the club decided to replace the bison in its crest with one of Nitra's main symbols, the Corgoň statue. The statue depicts Atlas, popularly known as Corgoň, supporting the corner of one of the houses below Nitra Castle. The statue is associated with a legend about a blacksmith from Nitra who fought against the Ottoman forces.

The club's most recent crest redesign took place in 2018, when it introduced its current crest. The crest retained the image of Corgoň, but now features only his head, with the club's name and year of foundation arranged in a circle around it. During the 2025–26 season, as part of its centenary celebrations, the club used its first-ever crest, consisting of the letter “N”, on some occasions.

=== Supporters ===
HK Nitra have long been highly regarded for their fan base, which is often described by the public and the media as the best in Slovakia. Home games are always accompanied by a loud and passionate atmosphere. In the 2025–26 season, HK Nitra's average attendance was 2,883 spectators per game, although the arena was sold out several times during the season. Overall, the arena's average occupancy rate was therefore above 80%. During the playoffs, average attendance rose to 3,471 spectators per game, representing an occupancy rate of 96.42%. The club has consistently recorded similarly strong attendance figures over the years and regularly fills its 3,600-capacity arena for home games.

HK Nitra has an official supporters' club, which supports the team at both home and away games. Before the supporters' club was established, the core of the team's fan base consisted mainly of ultras from football club FC Nitra. Their activities were also associated with incidents of disorder in the past, including clashes with supporters of other clubs. The best-known incident occurred in 2004, when FC Nitra ultras were involved in a fight with supporters of MHC Martin. The club was fined for these incidents and subsequently began working more closely with its supporters.

This led to the establishment of a separate ice hockey supporters' club, which gradually improved the behaviour of the fans to the point where they are now highly regarded. Nevertheless, the club has still received fines for the behaviour of its supporters, although these have generally been related to fans' chants rather than fights or other incidents of disorder. In 2024, the Slovak Ice Hockey Federation even ordered the HK Nitra supporters' section to be closed for one game as a punishment for the fans' use of vulgar chants.For this reason, HK Nitra's management regularly meets with representatives of the supporters' club to help prevent the use of vulgar chants during matches. The club actively supports its fans and sometimes helps them prepare choreographies for matches. As a result, the conduct of the supporters has improved. The atmosphere at HK Nitra's home games has consequently been praised by players from both Slovak and foreign clubs who have played against Nitra.

=== Rivalries ===
The club's main rival has been HC Slovan Bratislava since the Czechoslovak era. The rivalry is believed to have originated from the football rivalry between FC Nitra and ŠK Slovan Bratislava. Matches between the two clubs have regularly been marked by a tense atmosphere. In 2003, a mass brawl involving players from both teams broke out during a game between the clubs, resulting in a total of 153 penalty minutes being assessed by the officials. Both clubs were fined for the incident. Several fights between players also marred a match between the two clubs in 2008. In 2011, Slovan Bratislava staff members and players were allegedly involved in an attack on Nitra player Martin Bača in the dressing room following a game in Bratislava, after Bača had fought with Slovan Bratislava's star player Miroslav Šatan during the game. Representatives of Slovan Bratislava denied the allegations.

Following one of the games in the 2025–26 Extraliga final series in Bratislava, Slovan Bratislava supporters attacked HK Nitra fans as they were leaving the arena. One HK Nitra female supporter sustained injuries in the incident. Following the 2025–26 season, in which HK Nitra defeated HC Slovan Bratislava in the Extraliga final, the club's star player Samuel Buček transferred to Slovan Bratislava. The move provoked a strongly negative reaction from HK Nitra officials and supporters. HK Nitra president Miroslav Kováčik also publicly criticised the transfer, comparing Buček's move to a transfer between FC Barcelona and Real Madrid.

=== Home arena ===
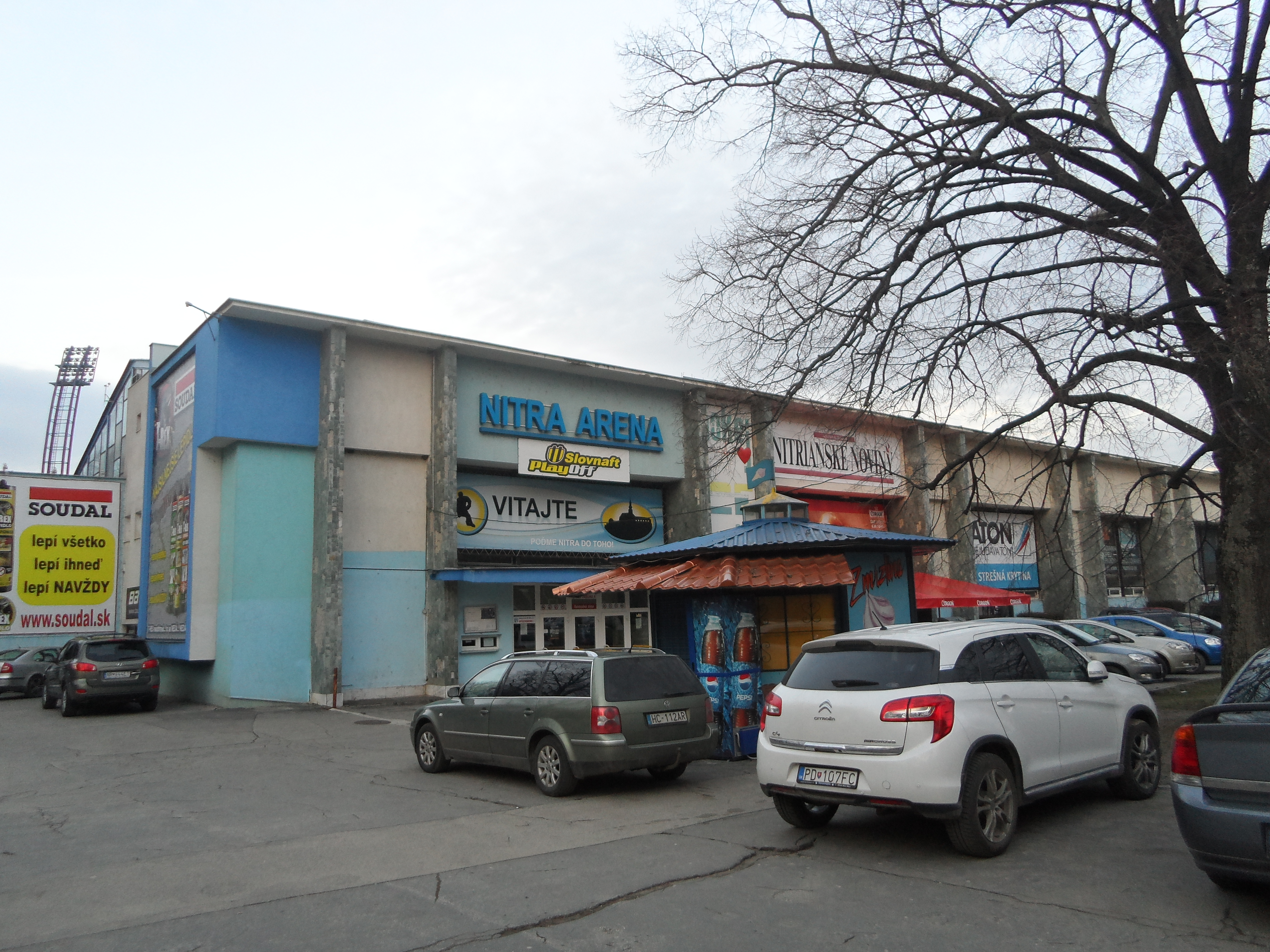
Exterior view of Nitra Arena.

HK Nitra have played their home games at Nitra Arena since 1957. The arena is located in Sihoť Park in Nitra. Before then, the club played its home games next to the site of the present-day ice hockey arena, where the football stadium known as Štadión pod Zoborom now stands. When construction of the football stadium began, a new venue had to be built for the club's ice hockey games. The new site was chosen immediately next to it, on the former site of the original football stadium. The football and ice hockey stadiums therefore effectively switched places. Construction of the ice hockey arena began in 1955 and was completed in 1957. The arena was roofed in 1973, giving it essentially its present-day appearance. Over the years, the arena has undergone several renovations, bringing its capacity to the current 3,600 seats.

In 2024, the first plans for the construction of a new ice hockey arena with a planned capacity of 5,500 seats were unveiled. The new arena is also expected to include two practice ice rinks. The estimated cost in 2024 was €60 million, with construction scheduled to begin in 2027. In 2026, several architectural firms were selected to participate in a design competition for the new arena. The planned capacity is expected to remain at 5,500 seats, while the capacity could be increased to up to 7,000 for concerts and other cultural events. The new arena is planned to be built on the site of the existing adjacent covered ice rink, which is located immediately next to the current arena.

== Season-by-season record ==
This is a partial list of the last eleven seasons completed by HK Nitra. For the full season-by-season history, see List of HK Nitra seasons.

Note: GP = Games played, W = Wins, OTW = Overtime/shootout wins, OTL = Overtime/shootout losses, L = Losses, Pts = Points, GF = Goals for, GA = Goals against

Season	GP	W	OTW	OTL	L	Pts	GF	GA	Finish	Playoffs
2015–16	50	30	3	1	16	97	160	129	2nd, Extraliga	Slovak Extraliga Champions, 4–2 (HC ’05 Banská Bystrica)
2016–17	56	33	4	5	14	112	196	154	2nd, Extraliga	Lost in Finals, 1–4 (HC ’05 Banská Bystrica)
2017–18	56	32	6	4	14	112	197	148	1st, Extraliga	Lost in Semifinals, 0–4 (HC ’05 Banská Bystrica)
2018–19	57	32	5	4	16	110	217	138	3rd, Extraliga	Lost in Finals, 1–4 (HC ’05 Banská Bystrica)
2019–20	48	18	2	7	21	65	124	136	8th, Extraliga	Not held due to the coronavirus pandemic
2020–21	50	25	3	8	14	89	163	156	5th, Extraliga	Lost in Quarterfinals, 1–4 (HC Slovan Bratislava)
2021–22	50	26	8	3	13	97	189	137	3rd, Extraliga	Lost in Finals, 2–4 (HC Slovan Bratislava)
2022–23	50	17	3	4	26	61	125	157	10th, Extraliga	Lost in Quarterfinals, 1–4 (HC Košice)
2023–24	50	21	4	5	20	76	172	158	8th, Extraliga	Slovak Extraliga Champions, 4–0 (HK Spišská Nová Ves)
2024–25	54	25	8	6	15	97	197	163	3rd, Extraliga	Lost in Finals, 3–4 (HC Košice)
2025–26	50	29	6	4	11	103	172	118	1st, Extraliga	Slovak Extraliga Champions, 4–3 (HC Slovan Bratislava)

== Honours ==
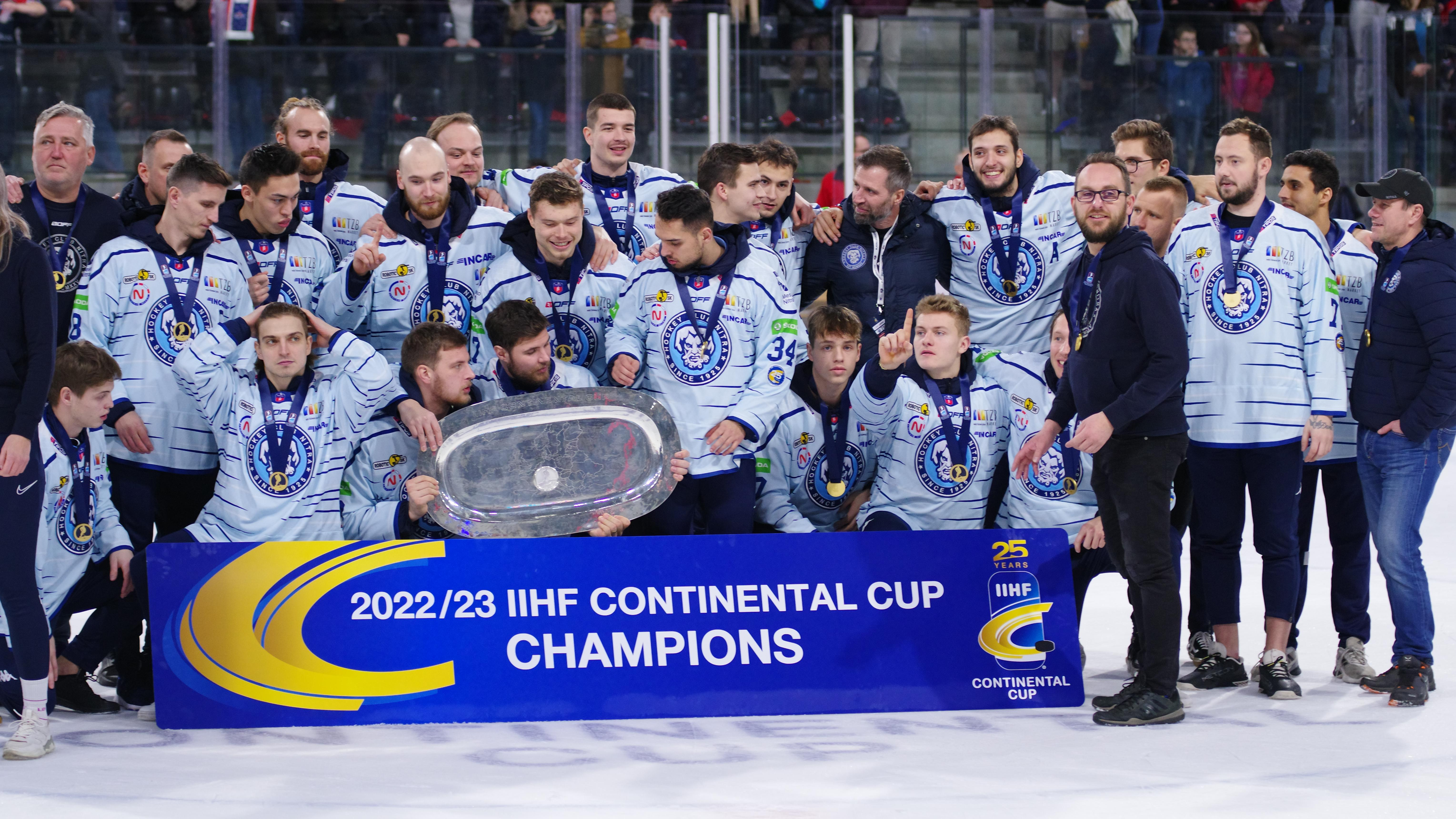
HK Nitra in 2023 Continental Cup

=== Domestic ===
Slovak Extraliga

- (gold) Winners (3): 2015–16, 2023–24, 2025–26
- (silver) Runners-up (5): 2013–14, 2016–17, 2018–19, 2021–22, 2024–25
- (bronze) 3rd place (4): 2005–06, 2012–13, 2014–15, 2017–18

Slovak 1. Liga

- (gold) Winners (1): 2002–03
- (silver) Runners-up (1): 2000–01

1st. Slovak National Hockey League

- (gold) Winners (5): 1983–84, 1986–87, 1987–88, 1991–92, 1992–93
- (silver) Runners-up (4): 1978–79, 1982–83, 1988–89, 1989–90
- (bronze) 3rd place (2): 1979–80, 1980–81

=== International ===
IIHF Continental Cup

- (gold) Winners (1): 2022–23

=== Pre-season ===
Tatra Cup

- (gold) Winners (1): 1933/1934

Rona Cup

- (gold) Winners (1): 2010

== Players ==
=== Current roster ===
As of 14 September 2026.

No.	Nat	Player	Pos	S/G	Age	Acquired	Birthplace
2	(Slovakia)	Matej Bača	D	L	30	2023	Liptovský Mikuláš, Slovakia
21	(Slovakia)	Filip Bajtek	RW	L	35	2020	Třinec, Czechoslovakia
23	(Slovakia)	Oliver Botka	D	L	17	2025	Púchov, Slovakia
15	(Canada)	Elias Carmichael	D	L	24	2022	Langley, British Columbia, Canada
29	(Slovakia)	Tomáš Chrenko	C	R	18	2023	Nitra, Slovakia
32	(Slovakia)	Michal Dubek	G	R	21	2025	Bratislava, Slovakia
31	(Slovakia)	Shika Gadzhiev	G	L	21	2026	Makhachkala, Russia
89	(Slovakia)	Adrián Holešinský	RW	L	30	2025	Čadca, Slovakia
80	(Slovakia)	Tomáš Hrnka (A)	C	L	34	2020	Nitra, Czechoslovakia
91	(United States)	Robby Jackson	C	L	29	2023	Alameda, California, United States
28	(Slovakia)	Adam Kalman	D	L	19	2024	Myjava, Slovakia
9	(Slovakia)	Hugo Kováč	RW	L	26	2024	Nitra, Slovakia
13	(Slovakia)	Michal Krištof (A)	C	L	32	2025	Nitra, Slovakia
39	(Slovakia)	Jakub Lacka	LW	R	27	2022	Bratislava, Slovakia
11	(Slovakia)	Dario Lašš	RW	L	20	2026	Martin, Slovakia
33	(Slovakia)	Matej Marinov	G	L	23	2026	Nitra, Slovakia
24	(Slovakia)	Branislav Mezei (C)	D	L	45	2015	Nitra, Czechoslovakia
34	(Slovakia)	Tarik Michálik	C	L	20	2026	Winterthur, Switzerland
96	(Slovakia)	Ondrej Molnár	LW	L	21	2025	Nitra, Slovakia
88	(Slovakia)	Dávid Okoličány	RW	L	29	2023	Trstená, Slovakia
44	(United States)	Zach Osburn	D	R	29	2025	Plymouth, Michigan, USA
67	(Slovakia)	Matej Paulovič	LW	R	31	2025	Topoľčany, Slovakia
71	(Canada)	Brett Pollock	C	L	30	2026	Regina, Saskatchewan, Canada
19	(Slovakia)	Samuel Sisik	LW	L	21	2026	Bratislava, Slovakia
16	(Slovakia)	Marko Stacha	D	L	24	2022	Ilava, Slovakia
36	(Sweden)	Dmytro Timashov	LW	L	30	2026	Kirovohrad, Ukraine
98	(Slovakia)	Artur Turanský	LW	L	25	2025	Bratislava, Slovakia
20	(Slovakia)	Peter Valent	D	L	20	2023	Nitra, Slovakia
17	(Slovakia)	Martin Vitaloš	D	R	26	2022	Bratislava, Slovakia

=== Team captains ===
- Viliam Scháner, 1969-1972
- J. Košovan, 1972-1974
- Viliam Scháner, 1974-1975
- Milan Grandtner, 1975-1976
- Marián Oravec, 1979-1980
- Rudolf Uličný, 1980-1982
- Miroslav Ocelka, 1983-1984
- Milan Barto, 1985-1986
- Jiří Kodet, 1990-1991
- Ivan Hrtús, 1993-1994
- Peter Oremus, 1995-1996
- Miroslav Kukla, 1996-1997
- Matúš Hrušovský, 1997-1998
- Dušan Milo, 1998-1999
- Roman Tomašech, 2000-2001
- Ľubomír Kolník, 2001-2002
- Peter Košťál, 2002-2003
- Ľubomír Kolník, 2003-2004
- Daniel Socha, 2004-2005
- Miroslav Stefanka, 2005–2008
- Ľubomír Kolník, 2008
- Jan Hranáč, 2008
- Andrej Kmeč, 2008–2010
- Miroslav Stefanka, 2010–2012
- Miroslav Kovacik, 2012–2013
- Jozef Stümpel, 2013–2016
- Branislav Mezei, 2016–present

== Franchise leaders ==
=== Scoring leaders ===
These are the top-ten point-scorers in franchise history. Figures are updated after each completed Extraliga regular season.

- * – current HK Nitra player

Note: Pos = Position; GP = Games Played; G = Goals; A = Assists; Pts = Points; P/G = Points per game

Points
Player	Pos	GP	G	A	Pts	P/G
Tomáš Chrenko	C	572	181	278	459	0.80
Ivan Hrtús	C	318	176	173	349	1.1
Marek Slovák	C	491	130	204	334	.68
Miroslav Stefanka	C	475	112	195	307	.65
Henrich Ručkay	LW	476	155	140	295	.62
Martin Miklík	LW	336	182	110	292	.87
Samuel Buček	RW	279	145	118	263	.94
Jozef Stümpel	C	284	86	171	257	.90
Ľubomír Kolník	RW	331	142	110	252	.76
Juraj Štefanka	LW	376	102	122	224	.60

Goals
Player	Pos	G
Martin Miklík	LW	182
Tomáš Chrenko	C	181
Ivan Hrtús	C	176
Henrich Ručkay	LW	155
Samuel Buček	RW	145
Ľubomír Kolník	RW	142
Marek Slovák	C	130
Vladimír Béreš	C	121
Miroslav Stefanka	C	112
Juraj Štefanka	LW	102

Assists
Player	Pos	A
Tomáš Chrenko	C	278
Marek Slovák	C	204
Miroslav Stefanka	C	195
Ivan Hrtús	C	173
Jozef Stümpel	C	171
Dušan Milo	C	167
Henrich Ručkay	LW	140
Branislav Mezei*	D	132
Andrej Kmeč	RW	130
Albín Podstavek	C	124

== Notes ==
Preceded by HC Košice	Slovak Extraliga; Champions; 2015–16	Succeeded by HC '05 Banská Bystrica
Preceded by HC Košice	Slovak Extraliga; Champions; 2023–24	Succeeded by Incumbent
