= Jozef Kováčik =

Slovak ice hockey player

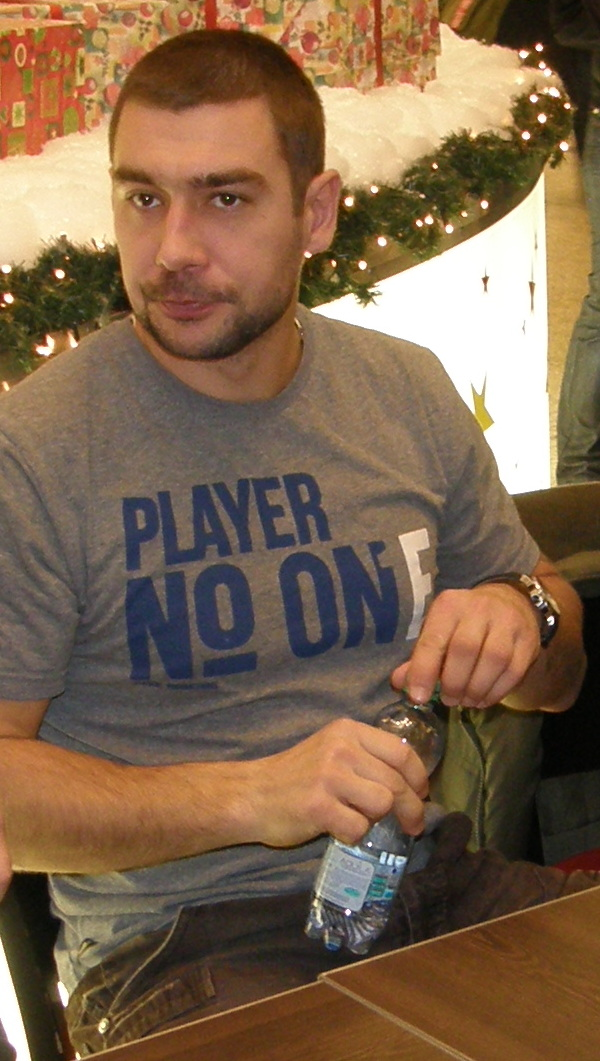
- Born: January 1, 1980 (age 45); Topoľčany, Czechoslovakia
- Height: 5 ft 10 in (178 cm)
- Weight: 196 lb (89 kg; 14 st 0 lb)
- Position: Defence
- Shot: Left
- Czech Extraliga team Former teams: HC Kometa Brno; HC Slovan Bratislava
- NHL draft: Undrafted
- Playing career: 2000–2022

Jozef Kovacik (born January 1, 1980) is a Slovak professional ice hockey. He currently plays with HC Kometa Brno in the Czech Extraliga.

He played with HC Slovan Bratislava in the Slovak Extraliga.

== Career statistics ==
			Regular season					Playoffs
Season	Team	League	GP	G	A	Pts	PIM	GP	G	A	Pts	PIM
1995–96	HC Topolcany U20	Slovak U20	39	14	6	20	73	—	—	—	—	—
1996–97	HC Topolcany U20	Slovak U20	49	5	6	11	32	—	—	—	—	—
1996–97	HC VTJ Telvis Topoľčany	Slovak2	1	0	0	0	0	—	—	—	—	—
1997–98	HC Topolcany U20	Slovak U20	49	6	14	20	66	—	—	—	—	—
1997–98	HC VTJ Telvis Topoľčany	Slovak2	10	0	2	2	6	—	—	—	—	—
1998–99	HC VTJ Telvis Topoľčany	Slovak2	23	1	1	2	4	—	—	—	—	—
1999–00	HC Topolcany U20	Slovak U20	37	7	19	26	70	—	—	—	—	—
1999–00	HC VTJ Telvis Topoľčany	Slovak2	36	4	7	11	12	—	—	—	—	—
2000–01	HC VTJ Telvis Topoľčany	Slovak2	9	1	8	9	12	—	—	—	—	—
2000–01	HC Ytong Brno U20	Czech U20	2	0	1	1	0	—	—	—	—	—
2000–01	HC Ytong Brno	Czech2	34	2	5	7	16	—	—	—	—	—
2002–03	MHC Martin	Slovak	48	10	7	17	32	4	0	1	1	2
2003–04	MHC Martin	Slovak	48	4	6	10	61	—	—	—	—	—
2004–05	HK Nitra	Slovak	51	4	10	14	56	5	1	1	2	16
2005–06	HK Nitra	Slovak	41	6	2	8	30	13	2	1	3	22
2006–07	HK Nitra	Slovak	53	7	13	20	59	6	1	0	1	24
2007–08	HC Slovan Bratislava	Slovak	52	6	14	20	59	18	4	6	10	20
2008–09	HC Slovan Bratislava	Slovak	45	4	18	22	28	12	1	4	5	18
2008–09	ERV Chemnitz 07	Germany4	9	0	0	0	0	—	—	—	—	—
2009–10	HC Slovan Bratislava	Slovak	43	7	16	23	56	15	2	8	10	61
2010–11	HC Slovan Bratislava	Slovak	56	4	13	17	52	6	0	1	1	4
2011–12	HK Nitra	Slovak	6	1	1	2	53	—	—	—	—	—
2011–12	HC Kometa Brno	Czech	46	4	9	13	50	20	4	7	11	20
2012–13	HC Kometa Brno	Czech	43	5	15	20	38	—	—	—	—	—
2013–14	HC Kometa Brno	Czech	50	3	14	17	50	18	2	3	5	14
2014–15	HC Kometa Brno	Czech	19	1	2	3	24	12	1	3	4	16
2015–16	HC Kometa Brno	Czech	45	8	22	30	82	4	0	2	2	0
2016–17	HC Kometa Brno	Czech	45	4	8	12	48	14	2	6	8	2
2017–18	HK Nitra	Slovak	13	0	1	1	4	—	—	—	—	—
2017–18	HC Topolcany	Slovak2	1	1	1	2	0	—	—	—	—	—
2017–18	HKM Zvolen	Slovak	37	4	15	19	36	12	1	3	4	18
2018–19	HC Topolcany	Slovak2	38	6	17	23	10	8	0	1	1	20
2019–20	HC Topolcany	Slovak2	41	5	22	27	32	—	—	—	—	—
2021–22	HC Kometa Brno B	Czech3	7	2	4	6	2	—	—	—	—	—
Czech totals			248	25	70	95	292	68	9	21	30	52
Slovak totals			493	57	116	173	526	91	12	25	37	185
