= 1988–89 1. Slovenská národná hokejová liga season =

Czechoslovak sporting event

The 1988–89 1. Slovenská národná hokejová liga season was the 20th season of the 1. Slovenská národná hokejová liga, the second level of ice hockey in Czechoslovakia alongside the 1. Česká národní hokejová liga. 12 teams participated in the league, and Partizán Liptovský Mikuláš won the championship. ZŤS Martin and ZVL Skalica were relegated.

== Regular season ==
	Club	GP	W	T	L	Goals	Pts
1.	Partizán Liptovský Mikuláš	44	29	8	7	186:124	66
2.	Plastika Nitra	44	30	3	11	208:144	63
3.	Spartak ZŤS Dubnica nad Váhom	44	29	4	11	189:115	62
4.	VTJ Topoľčany	44	22	9	13	177:141	53
5.	PS Poprad	44	19	9	16	189:162	47
6.	VTJ Michalovce	44	19	9	16	160:142	47
7.	ZPA Prešov	44	20	3	21	169:185	43
8.	Iskra Smrečina Banská Bystrica	44	16	7	21	145:167	39
9.	ZTK Zvolen	44	12	11	21	154:152	35
10.	Slávia Ekonóm Bratislava	44	14	6	24	174:232	34
11.	ZŤS Martin	44	13	6	25	152:191	32
12.	ZVL Skalica	44	2	3	39	97:245	7
