= 1991–92 1. Slovenská národná hokejová liga season =

The 1991–92 1. Slovenská národná hokejová liga season was the 23rd season of the 1. Slovenská národná hokejová liga, the second level of ice hockey in Czechoslovakia alongside the 1. Česká národní hokejová liga. 12 teams participated in the league, and AC Nitra won the championship. Sparta ZVL Považská Bystrica was relegated.

== Regular season ==
	Club	GP	W	T	L	Goals	Pts
1.	AC Nitra	44	34	4	6	262:103	72
2.	Hutník ZŤS Martin	44	27	6	11	195:120	60
3.	Štart Spišská Nová Ves	44	29	2	13	190:124	60
4.	ZTK Zvolen	44	25	4	15	194:178	54
5.	Iskra Smrečina Banská Bystrica	44	19	8	17	185:184	46
6.	Spartak ZŤS Dubnica nad Váhom	44	18	9	17	200:193	45
7.	ZPA Prešov	44	18	9	17	173:170	45
8.	HK 32 Liptovský Mikuláš	44	19	5	20	196:182	43
9.	VTJ Michalovce	44	18	3	23	183:211	39
10.	VTJ Topoľčany	44	13	7	24	136:171	33
11.	HK 31 Kežmarok	44	7	8	29	148:237	22
12.	Sparta ZVL Považská Bystrica	44	3	3	38	96:285	9
