= 2nd. Czechoslovak Hockey League =

- Sport: Ice hockey
- Founded: 1953
- Folded: 1969
- Country: Czechoslovakia

The Czechoslovak 2. liga was the second level of ice hockey in Czechoslovakia from 1953-1969.

== History ==
The league was created as the Celostátní soutěž (which it was known as until 1956) in 1953. For the first season, it was divided into Groups A-D, with the top team from each group meeting for the final. For 1954-55, Groups E and F were added, and the top team from each group again met for the final. From 1955-1963, the league was divided into Groups A and B, and no final was held. For the 1963-64 season, the league expanded to four groups, with Group D consisting solely of Slovak teams.

After the 1968-69 season, the league was replaced by the 1. česká národní hokejová liga for Czech teams, and the 1. slovenská národná hokejová liga for Slovak teams.
