= Miroslav Šatan =

Slovak ice hockey player (born 1974)

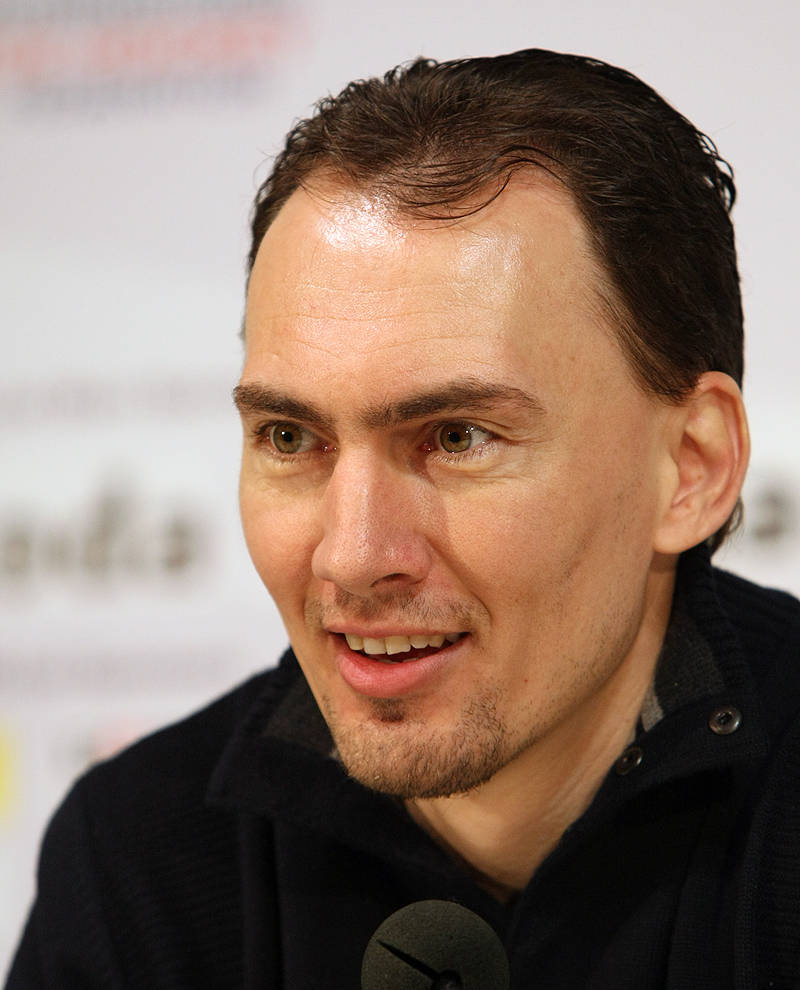
- Šatan in 2010
- Born: 22 October 1974 (age 51) Jacovce, Czechoslovakia
- Height: 6 ft 3 in (191 cm)
- Weight: 191 lb (87 kg; 13 st 9 lb)
- Position: Right wing
- Shot: Left
- Played for: Dukla Trenčín; Edmonton Oilers; Buffalo Sabres; Slovan Bratislava; New York Islanders; Pittsburgh Penguins; Boston Bruins; Dynamo Moscow
- National team: Slovakia
- NHL draft: 111th overall, 1993; Edmonton Oilers
- Playing career: 1992–2014

Miroslav Šatan (Slovak pronunciation: [ˈmirɔslaw ˈʂatan]; born 22 October 1974) is a Slovak former professional ice hockey right winger, who played 15 seasons in the National Hockey League (NHL), five in the Tipos Extraliga, and three in the Kontinental Hockey League (KHL). Šatan was inducted into the IIHF Hall of Fame in 2019.

== Playing career ==
=== Pre-NHL ===
In 1991–92, Šatan played for the local HC Topoľčany and did remarkably well, as he scored 30 goals and had 22 assists in just 31 games. He then graduated to the senior division within the same year. When he became 18, he joined Dukla Trenčín rather than enter compulsory army service for Slovakia (which stopped in 2006). He played there for the 1992–93 and 1993–94 seasons.

=== Edmonton Oilers ===
Šatan was drafted 111th overall in the 1993 NHL entry draft by the Edmonton Oilers. Prior to his entry into the NHL, he played in the Czechoslovak and Slovak leagues and he had scored nine goals in eight games representing Slovakia at the 1994 Winter Olympic Games.

In 1994–95, Šatan played a season in the minor leagues, split between four teams including the Oilers' minor league affiliate, the Cape Breton Oilers, and the International Hockey League's Detroit Vipers. While with the Vipers, he scored the winning goal in an exhibition game against Wayne Gretzky's Ninety-Niners, an all-star team put together by Gretzky during the 1994–95 NHL lockout.

=== Buffalo Sabres ===
After two seasons with the Oilers, Šatan was traded to the Buffalo Sabres in exchange for Craig Millar and Barrie Moore. He would lead the Sabres in scoring on six occasions. During the 2004–05 NHL Lockout, Šatan played for Slovan Bratislava in the Slovak Extraliga. After the lockout, Šatan was not offered a contract by the Sabres.

=== New York Islanders ===
Šatan signed as a free agent with the New York Islanders on 3 August 2005. He led the Islanders in goals in the 2005–06 season. His 35 goals during the season were his highest goal-output since the 2001–02 season with the Sabres. Almost half his 35 goals came on the power play (17), also a career personal best. Šatan tied for the team lead in points with 66, shared with captain Alexei Yashin. Also in 2005–06, Šatan went seven for ten (70%) and was third in the NHL in shooting percentage in the shootout.

On 2 December 2006, he scored his 300th career goal, against the Pittsburgh Penguins. Earlier in the season, he had recorded his 300th career assist and his 600th career point.

On 24 March 2007, Šatan missed the Islanders' game in Philadelphia for personal reasons, ending a streak of having played in 305 consecutive games. It was the fourth longest active streak at the time, and marked the second time in his career that he had played over 250 consecutive games. He had a 256-game streak as a member of the Sabres that ended in November 2002.

=== Pittsburgh Penguins ===
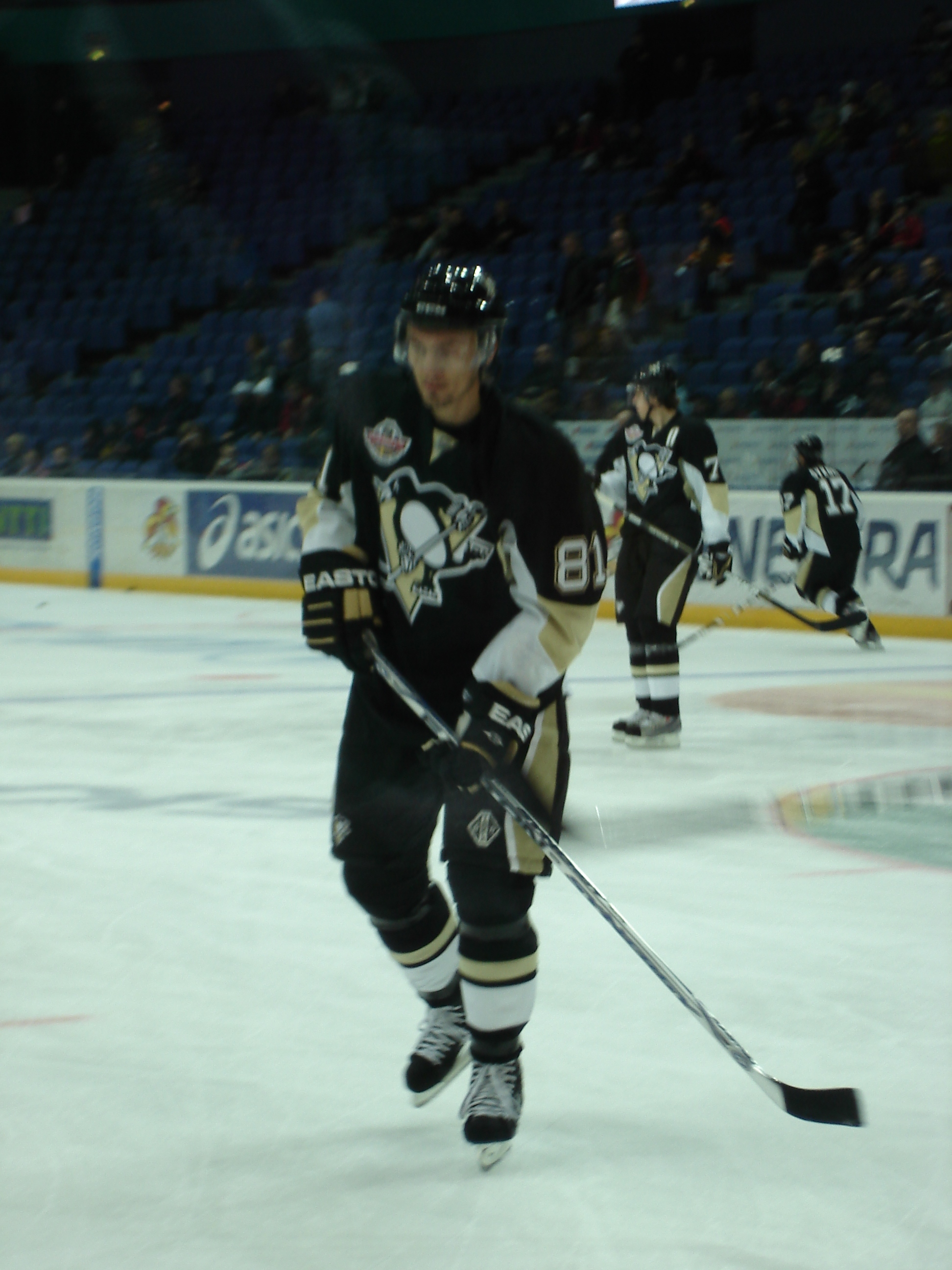
Šatan with the Pittsburgh Penguins

On 3 July 2008, Šatan signed a one-year contract with the Pittsburgh Penguins. During the 2008–09 season, Šatan was placed on waivers by Pittsburgh on 4 March 2009, the same day as the NHL trade deadline, not long after playing in his 1,000th NHL game. Having not been claimed by another team, Šatan was assigned to the Penguins' American Hockey League (AHL) affiliate, the Wilkes-Barre/Scranton Penguins. In Wilkes-Barre, Šatan had three goals and nine points in ten games. Various reports credited him with being upbeat and a good influence, especially with the younger players.

On 10 April 2009, Šatan was recalled by Pittsburgh and cleared re-entry waivers. He re-established himself with the Penguins in the 2009 Stanley Cup playoffs when he played against the Washington Capitals in game five of the Eastern Conference Semifinals on April 23. He then played in nine games and won his first ever Stanley Cup as a member of the Penguins.

The Penguins did not re-sign Šatan when his contract expired at the end of the season, and he was not signed during the free agency period.

=== Boston Bruins ===
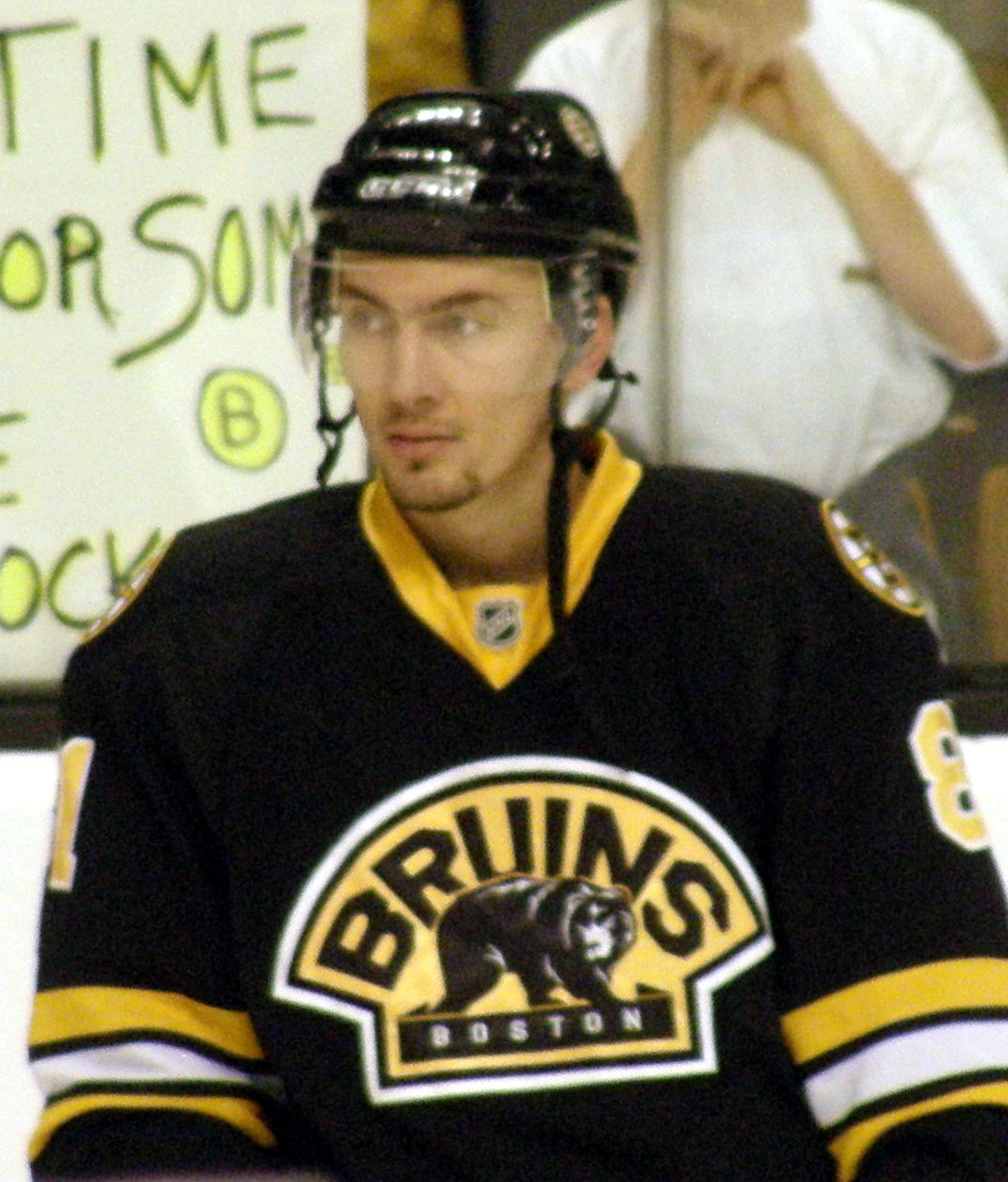
With the Boston Bruins in 2010

On 2 January 2010, Šatan signed a US$700,000 contract with the Boston Bruins for the remainder of the 2009–10 season. The contract included a no movement clause. He made his Bruins debut against the Ottawa Senators on January 5, finishing with a +2 plus-minus. He scored his first a goal as a Bruin on January 7 against Chicago Blackhawks goaltender Antti Niemi. On April 21, he scored the game-winning goal in double overtime to defeat the Buffalo Sabres and take a 3–1 lead in the Eastern Conference Quarterfinals. On April 26, Šatan then scored the series-winning goal over the Sabres with 5 minutes remaining in the game, which they won 4–3.

=== Dynamo Moscow ===
At the beginning of 2011, Šatan signed with Dynamo Moscow of the Kontinental Hockey League (KHL) until the end of 2010–11 season. The club opted not to renew his contract upon its expiry.

=== Return to Slovan Bratislava and retirement ===
On 8 September 2011, Šatan moved to the Slovak Extraliga to rejoin former club Slovan Bratislava. In 2012–13, Slovan moved from the Slovak Extraliga to the KHL and named Šatan team captain. He was badly injured by his former Boston Bruins teammate Zdeno Chára in a match against Lev Praha on 3 November 2012. Subsequently, Šatan said he did not know if he would play another hockey match in his life. Šatan would return to play in the 2013 IIHF World Championship.

Šatan announced his retirement from professional ice hockey on 20 May 2014.

== Post-playing career ==
In September 2015, Šatan was appointed general manager for Team Europe to compete in the 2016 World Cup. Team Europe finished second in the tournament after losing the final series to Canada.

In June 2019, he was elected President of the Slovak Ice Hockey Federation.

== Personal life ==
Šatan grew up in Topoľčany, Slovakia. He married his long-time girlfriend Ingrid in 2004. They have a son, Miroslav Jr., born in March 2006 and a daughter, Viktoria, born in July 2009, and live in Jericho, New York. Miroslav Jr. also plays hockey, and was drafted by the Washington Capitals in the seventh round of the 2024 NHL entry draft.

Because Šatan's name is a heteronym of Satan, many devil-related jokes have been made at his expense. During his career, many sports-data sites (including Fox Sports, Sports Illustrated, ESPN and Yahoo Sports) used the number 666 in the URL of Šatan's page. A popular April Fool's joke had Šatan traded to the New Jersey Devils and been made captain of his new team, making Šatan the "leader" of the Devils. After Šatan announced his retirement in 2014, the Yahoo Sports headline read: "Satan be gone!"

== Awards and honors ==
- Slovak Extraliga champion (1994, 2012)
- NHL All-Star Game (2000, 2003)
- World Championships Best Forward, All-Star Team, and scoring leader (2000)
- World Championships gold medal (2002)
- Stanley Cup champion (2009)
- KHL All-Star Game (2014)
- Inducted into the IIHF Hall of Fame (2019)
- Named to the IIHF All-Time Slovakia Team (2020)

== Career statistics ==
=== Regular season and playoffs ===
			Regular season					Playoffs
Season	Team	League	GP	G	A	Pts	PIM	GP	G	A	Pts	PIM
1991–92	HC Topoľčany	SVK.2	9	2	1	3	6	—	—	—	—	—
1992–93	ASVŠ Dukla Trenčín	TCH	38	11	6	17	—	—	—	—	—	—
1993–94	Dukla Trenčín	SVK	30	32	16	48	16	9	10	6	16	—
1994–95	Cape Breton Oilers	AHL	25	24	16	40	15	—	—	—	—	—
1994–95	Detroit Vipers	IHL	8	1	3	4	4	—	—	—	—	—
1994–95	Detroit Falcons	CoHL	1	0	2	2	2	—	—	—	—	—
1994–95	San Diego Gulls	IHL	6	0	2	2	6	—	—	—	—	—
1995–96	Edmonton Oilers	NHL	62	18	17	35	22	—	—	—	—	—
1996–97	Edmonton Oilers	NHL	64	17	11	28	22	—	—	—	—	—
1996–97	Buffalo Sabres	NHL	12	8	2	10	4	7	0	0	0	0
1997–98	Buffalo Sabres	NHL	79	22	24	46	34	14	5	4	9	4
1998–99	Buffalo Sabres	NHL	81	40	26	66	44	12	3	5	8	2
1999–2000	Buffalo Sabres	NHL	81	33	34	67	32	5	3	2	5	0
1999–2000	Dukla Trenčín	SVK	3	2	8	10	2	—	—	—	—	—
2000–01	Buffalo Sabres	NHL	82	29	33	62	36	13	3	10	13	8
2001–02	Buffalo Sabres	NHL	82	37	36	73	33	—	—	—	—	—
2002–03	Buffalo Sabres	NHL	79	26	49	75	20	—	—	—	—	—
2003–04	Buffalo Sabres	NHL	82	29	28	57	30	—	—	—	—	—
2003–04	Slovan Bratislava	SVK	7	6	4	10	41	—	—	—	—	—
2004–05	Slovan Bratislava	SVK	18	11	9	20	14	18	15	7	22	16
2005–06	New York Islanders	NHL	82	35	31	66	38	—	—	—	—	—
2006–07	New York Islanders	NHL	81	27	32	59	46	5	1	2	3	0
2007–08	New York Islanders	NHL	80	16	25	41	39	—	—	—	—	—
2008–09	Pittsburgh Penguins	NHL	65	17	19	36	36	17	1	5	6	11
2008–09	Wilkes–Barre/Scranton Penguins	AHL	10	3	6	9	4	—	—	—	—	—
2009–10	Boston Bruins	NHL	38	9	5	14	12	13	5	5	10	6
2010–11	Slovan Bratislava	SVK	10	10	6	16	22	—	—	—	—	—
2010–11	Dynamo Moscow	KHL	6	1	2	3	4	2	0	0	0	0
2011–12	Slovan Bratislava	SVK	49	23	29	52	127	12	8	14	22	10
2012–13	Slovan Bratislava	KHL	21	7	5	12	22	—	—	—	—	—
2013–14	Slovan Bratislava	KHL	23	9	3	12	8	—	—	—	—	—
SVK totals			117	84	72	156	222	39	33	27	60	26
NHL totals			1,050	363	372	735	464	86	21	33	54	41
KHL totals			50	17	10	27	34	2	0	0	0	0

=== International ===
Medal record

Representing Slovakia

World Championships
Gold medal – first place	2002 Sweden	
Silver medal – second place	2000 Russia	
Silver medal – second place	2012 Finland/Sweden	
Bronze medal – third place	2003 Finland	

Year	Team	Event	GP	G	A	Pts	PIM
1994	Slovakia	WJC C	4	6	7	13	4
1994	Slovakia	OLY	8	9	0	9	0
1994	Slovakia	WC C	6	7	1	8	18
1995	Slovakia	WC B	7	7	6	13	4
1996	Slovakia	WC	5	0	3	3	6
1996	Slovakia	WCH	3	0	0	0	2
2000	Slovakia	WC	9	10	2	12	14
2002	Slovakia	OLY	2	0	1	1	0
2002	Slovakia	WC	9	5	8	13	2
2003	Slovakia	WC	9	6	4	10	2
2004	Slovakia	WC	9	4	4	8	4
2005	Slovakia	WC	7	2	2	4	8
2006	Slovakia	OLY	6	0	2	2	2
2007	Slovakia	WC	7	1	7	8	4
2010	Slovakia	OLY	6	1	1	2	0
2010	Slovakia	WC	2	0	0	0	0
2011	Slovakia	WC	6	2	3	5	4
2012	Slovakia	WC	10	4	2	6	4
2013	Slovakia	WC	8	1	2	3	2
2014	Slovakia	WC	7	1	2	3	4
Senior totals			129	61	49	110	84

== See also ==
- List of NHL players with 1,000 games played

Preceded by Stu Barnes	Buffalo Sabres captain October 2003	Succeeded by Chris Drury
