= Peter Trokan =

Slovak ice hockey player

- Born: December 30, 1980 (age 44)
- Height: 5 ft 9 in (175 cm)
- Weight: 187 lb (85 kg; 13 st 5 lb)
- Position: Forward
- Played for: HC VTJ Telvis Topoľčany; MHK Dubnica; HK SKP Poprad; CG Puigcerdà; MHC Martin; MHK Dolny Kubin; Ducs de Dijon; SHK 37 Piestany; HC Dukla Senica; HK Trnava
- Playing career: 1999–2017

Peter Trokan is a Slovak professional ice hockey player in Slovakia with MHC Martin of the Slovak Extraliga.
