= 2002–03 Slovak 1. Liga season =

Slovak ice hockey league season

The 2002–03 Slovak 1.Liga season was the 10th season of the Slovak 1. Liga, the second level of ice hockey in Slovakia. 12 teams participated in the league, and MHC Nitra won the championship.

== Standings ==
	Club	GP	W	T	L	Goals	Pts
1.	MHC Nitra	44	34	4	6	214:87	72
2.	HK Spartak Dubnica	44	29	7	8	173:95	65
3.	HK VTJ Farmakol Prešov	44	26	5	13	181:114	57
4.	HC VTJ Topoľčany	44	23	2	19	175:165	48
5.	HKm Zvolen B	44	21	3	20	121:127	45
6.	HC Dukla Senica	44	20	2	22	164:187	42
7.	HK VTJ Trebišov	44	17	7	20	143:154	41
8.	MšHK Prievidza	44	17	5	22	121:140	39
9.	ŠaHK Iskra Banská Bystrica	44	15	7	22	122:154	37
10.	HK 95 Považská Bystrica	44	14	9	21	134:149	37
11.	HK Dukla Michalovce	44	10	6	28	104:161	26
12.	HK Ružinov 99 Bratislava	44	7	5	32	89:208	19
