= 1993–94 Slovak 1. Liga season =

Slovak ice hockey league season

The 1993–94 Slovak 1.Liga season was the first season of the Slovak 1. Liga, the second level of ice hockey in Slovakia. 10 teams participated in the league, and HK Spartak Dubnica won the championship.

== Standings ==
	Club	GP	W	T	L	Goals	Pts
1.	HK Spartak Dubnica	36	28	4	4	181:97	60
2.	ŠK Iskra Banská Bystrica	36	26	5	5	179:73	57
3.	HK 36 Skalica	36	19	5	12	160:116	43
4.	HC VTJ Michalovce	36	19	2	15	140:133	40
5.	VTJ Dukla Senica	36	10	10	16	118:142	30
6.	HK 31 Kežmarok	36	9	12	15	99:134	30
7.	VTJ Piešťany (HC Dukla Trenčín B)	36	10	9	17	102:135	29
8.	HK Levoča	36	11	6	19	115:143	28
9.	HK VTJ Žilina	36	12	4	20	116:158	28
10.	HC VTJ Topoľčany	36	6	3	27	69:168	15
