= Filip Bajtek =

Czech ice hockey winger

- Born: April 6, 1991 (age 33); Třinec, Czechoslovakia
- Height: 5 ft 9 in (175 cm)
- Weight: 176 lb (80 kg; 12 st 8 lb)
- Position: Winger
- Shoots: Left
- Slovak team Former teams: HK Nitra; HC Oceláři Třinec; HC Nové Zámky
- Playing career: 2011–present

Filip Bajtek (born April 6, 1991) is a Czech-born Slovak professional ice hockey winger playing for HK Nitra of the Slovak Extraliga.

Bajtek played one game for HC Oceláři Třinec during the 2011–12 Czech Extraliga season. In 2013, he joined HK Nitra of the Tipsport Liga where he spent four seasons. On August 6, 2017, Bajtek moved to Frýdek-Místek of the WSM Liga before returning to Slovakia with HC Nové Zámky on May 25, 2018.
