= Jan Hranáč =

Czech ice hockey player

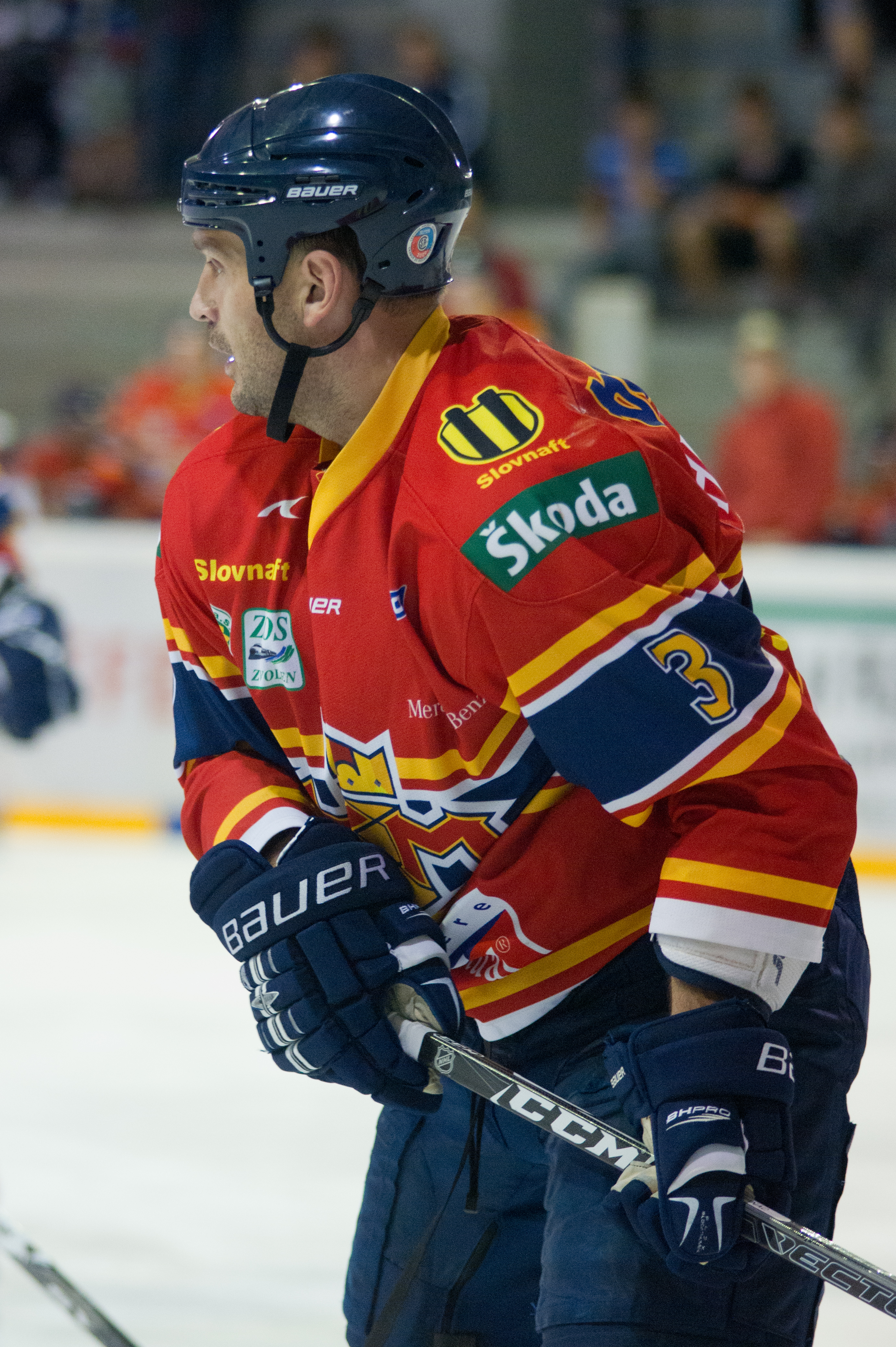
- Born: October 26, 1969 (age 55)
- Position: Defence
- Played for: HC Kladno; SK Kadaň; HC 99 TL Mělník; HC Chemopetrol; HC Lada Togliatti; HC Litvínov; HK Nitra; HK 36 Skalica; HKM Zvolen; HC Draci Bílina; HC Most; Orli Znojmo
- Playing career: 1997–2013

Jan Hranáč (born October 26, 1969) is a Czech professional ice hockey defenceman who is currently playing for HKm Zvolen in the Slovak Extraliga.

== Career statistics ==
			Regular season					Playoffs
Season	Team	League	GP	G	A	Pts	PIM	GP	G	A	Pts	PIM
1997–98	HC Kladno	Czech	49	2	9	11	40	—	—	—	—	—
1998–99	SK Kadaň	Czech2	—	—	—	—	—	—	—	—	—	—
1999–00	HC 99 TL Mělník	Czech2	40	5	7	12	58	8	1	1	2	16
2000–01	HC Chemopetrol	Czech	51	2	14	16	50	6	0	0	0	24
2001–02	HC Chemopetrol	Czech	20	1	1	2	54	—	—	—	—	—
2001–02	HC Lada Togliatti	Russia	13	1	1	2	10	4	0	0	0	6
2001–02	HC Lada Togliatti-2	Russia3	6	0	1	1	6	—	—	—	—	—
2002–03	HC Chemopetrol	Czech	50	5	9	14	112	—	—	—	—	—
2003–04	HC Chemopetrol	Czech	44	3	6	9	40	—	—	—	—	—
2004–05	HC Chemopetrol	Czech	45	2	4	6	40	5	1	0	1	6
2005–06	HC Chemopetrol	Czech	25	4	4	8	64	—	—	—	—	—
2005–06	SK Kadaň	Czech2	4	0	1	1	2	—	—	—	—	—
2006–07	HC Chemopetrol	Czech	52	3	6	9	100	—	—	—	—	—
2007–08	HC Litvínov	Czech	41	5	3	8	115	4	0	1	1	4
2008–09	HK Nitra	Slovak	21	4	8	12	34	—	—	—	—	—
2008–09	HK 36 Skalica	Slovak	35	6	31	37	38	16	5	6	11	24
2009–10	HK 36 Skalica	Slovak	43	6	19	25	87	7	1	2	3	4
2010–11	HKM Zvolen	Slovak	55	3	3	6	54	4	0	0	0	0
2011–12	HC Draci Bílina	Czech3	7	1	1	2	4	—	—	—	—	—
2011–12	HC Most	Czech2	7	1	2	3	8	—	—	—	—	—
2011–12	Orli Znojmo	EBEL	32	1	4	5	38	1	0	0	0	2
2012–13	HC Most	Czech2	36	2	9	11	60	—	—	—	—	—
Czech totals			377	27	56	83	615	15	1	1	2	34
