= 2025–26 Slovak Extraliga season =

- League: Slovak Extraliga
- Sport: Ice hockey
- Duration: 12 September 2025 – 8 March 2026 (regular season); 11 March – April 2026 (playoffs)
- Games: 54
- Teams: 12

Regular season

Playoffs

Finals

Slovak Extraliga seasons
- 2024–25 2026-27

The 2025–26 Slovak Extraliga season is the 33rd season of the Slovak Extraliga, the highest ice hockey league in Slovakia.

== Regular season ==
=== Standings ===
Each team played 54 games: playing each of the other eleven teams four times – 2x at home, 2x away (44 games) and during the Christmas holidays (12.12.2025 – 5.1.2026) each team played the inserted matches within variant "Group West" and "Group East" 1x at home, 1x away = 10 games.

Points were awarded for each game, where three points are awarded for winning in regulation time, two points for winning in overtime or shootout, one point for losing in overtime or shootout, and zero points for losing in regulation time. At the end of the regular season, the team that finished with the most points was crowned the league champion.

Pos	Team	Pld	W	OTW	OTL	L	GF	GA	GD	Pts	Qualification
1	Nitra	50	29	6	4	11	172	118	+54	103	Qualification to Quarter-finals
2	Slovan Bratislava	50	25	9	5	11	169	130	+39	98	Qualification to Quarter-finals
3	Košice	50	26	2	8	14	141	121	+20	90	Qualification to Quarter-finals
4	Žilina	50	24	5	5	16	153	134	+19	87	Qualification to Quarter-finals
5	Banská Bystrica	50	23	5	4	18	167	146	+21	83	Qualification to Quarter-finals
6	Poprad	50	19	8	5	18	162	133	+29	78	Qualification to Quarter-finals
7	Spišská Nová Ves	50	19	5	5	21	129	139	−10	72	Qualification to Wild card round
8	Liptovský Mikuláš	50	16	6	8	20	153	163	−10	68	Qualification to Wild card round
9	Michalovce	50	17	4	6	23	156	168	−12	65	Qualification to Wild card round
10	Zvolen	50	14	9	4	23	152	163	−11	64	Qualification to Wild card round
11	Trenčín	50	13	3	10	24	112	150	−38	55	Relegation series
12	Prešov	50	9	4	2	35	94	195	−101	37	Relegation series

Updated to match(es) played on 22 February 2026. Source: Tipos extraliga
Rules for classification: 1) Points; 2) Head-to-head points.

=== Statistics ===
==== Scoring leaders ====
The following players led the league in regular season points at the completion of games played on 22 February 2026.

Player	Team	GP	G	A	Pts	+/–	PIM
Carter Turnbull	HC '05 Banská Bystrica	47	32	32	64	+22	14
Jordan Martel	HK Dukla Michalovce	47	27	29	56	+4	50
Adam Cracknell	HK Poprad	49	23	32	55	+24	72
Marc-Olivier Roy	HK Dukla Michalovce	48	13	42	55	+9	38
Oleksiy Myklukha	HC '05 Banská Bystrica	48	16	38	54	+17	0
Jake Virtanen	HK Dukla Michalovce	50	28	24	52	–3	87
Brendan Ranford	Vlci Žilina	49	18	31	49	+16	65
Roman Faith	HC '05 Banská Bystrica	48	16	33	49	+18	76
Šimon Petráš	HC Košice	45	25	23	48	+11	14
Liam Pecararo	HC Slovan Bratislava	38	19	29	48	+11	26

==== Leading goaltenders ====
The following shows the top ten goaltenders who led the league in goals against average, provided that they have played at least 40% of their team's minutes, at the conclusion of games played on 22 February 2026.

Player	Team	GP	TOI	W	L	GA	SO	SV%	GAA
Jasper Patrikainen	HK Nitra	29	1,1717:18	21	8	58	6	93.03	2.03
Patrik Jurčák	HC Košice	26	1,453:55	13	13	54	4	91.56	2.23
Dominik Riečický	HC Košice	24	1,328:51	13	11	52	3	91.03	2.35
Henri Kiviaho	HC Slovan Bratislava	30	1,738:27	19	11	69	2	91.71	2.38
Connor Lacouvee	Vlci Žilina	31	1,703:52	16	15	69	2	91.70	2.43
Eugen Rabčan	HC '05 Banská Bystrica	37	2,111:28	20	17	90	5	92.08	2.56
Filip Surák	HK Spišská Nová Ves / MHk 32 Liptovský Mikuláš	27	1,473:30	13	14	63	3	91.08	2.57
Julian Junca	HK Spišská Nová Ves	25	1,405:48	10	15	61	1	92.18	2.60
Filip Belányi	HK Poprad	27	1,524:34	13	14	67	2	90.85	2.64
Pavel Kantor	HKM Zvolen	33	1,830:59	16	17	89	3	90.04	2.92

== Playoffs ==
Ten teams qualify for the playoffs: the top six teams in the regular season have a bye to the quarterfinals, while teams ranked seventh to tenth meet each other (7 versus 10, 8 versus 9) in a preliminary playoff round.

=== Bracket ===
Wild-card round (best-of-5)
7	Spišská Nová Ves	1
10	Michalovce	3
8	Liptovský Mikuláš	3
9	Zvolen	1

Quarter-finals (best-of-7)
1	Nitra	4
10	Michalovce	3
4	Žilina	2
5	Poprad	4
2	Slovan Bratislava	4
8	Liptovský Mikuláš	0
3	Košice	4
6	Banská Bystrica	3

Semi-finals (best-of-7)
1	Nitra	4
5	Poprad	1
(Pairings are re-seeded after the first and second round)
2	Slovan Bratislava	4
3	Košice	2

Finals (best-of-7)
1	Nitra	4
2	Slovan Bratislava	3

== Final rankings ==
Gold medal	Nitra
Silver medal	Slovan Bratislava
Bronze medal	Košice
4	Poprad
5	Žilina
6	Banská Bystrica
7	Liptovský Mikuláš
8	Michalovce
9	Spišská Nová Ves
10	Zvolen
11	
12	
