= Marek Slovák =

Slovak professional ice hockey player (born 1988)

- Born: 23 September 1988 (age 36); Nitra, Czechoslovakia
- Height: 5 ft 9 in (175 cm)
- Weight: 154 lb (70 kg; 11 st 0 lb)
- Position: Centre
- Shoots: Right
- Slovak team Former teams: HK Nitra; HC Nové Zámky; HK Orange 20; HKM Zvolen; HC 46 Bardejov; MsHK Žilina; Yunost Minsk; Bratislava Capitals; HC '05 Banská Bystrica; HC Košice
- NHL draft: Undrafted
- Playing career: 2006–present

Marek Slovák (born 23 September 1988) is a Slovak professional ice hockey player who currently playing for HK Nitra of the Slovak Extraliga.

== Career ==
Slovák previously played for HK Nitra, HC Nové Zámky, HKm Zvolen, HC Košice, MsHK Žilina and Bratislava Capitals. Slovák also played for the Yunost Minsk of the Belarusian Extraleague during the 2017–18 season.

== Career statistics ==
=== Regular season and playoffs ===
			Regular season					Playoffs
Season	Team	League	GP	G	A	Pts	PIM	GP	G	A	Pts	PIM
2006–07	HK Nitra	Slovak	23	3	2	5	0	6	0	0	0	2
2006–07	HC Nové Zámky	Slovak.1	8	1	1	2	6	—	—	—	—	—
2007–08	HK Orange 20	Slovak	22	3	6	9	22	—	—	—	—	—
2007–08	HK Nitra	Slovak	14	5	3	8	28	—	—	—	—	—
2008–09	HK Nitra	Slovak	21	1	2	3	10	—	—	—	—	—
2009–10	HK Nitra	Slovak	47	13	19	32	64	10	1	7	8	14
2010–11	HK Nitra	Slovak	56	9	15	24	66	5	0	3	3	16
2011–12	HKM Zvolen	Slovak	55	15	14	29	70	10	6	1	7	63
2012–13	HC Košice	Slovak	56	13	36	49	34	16	4	6	10	14
2013–14	HC Košice	Slovak	13	1	5	6	8	—	—	—	—	—
2013–14	HC 46 Bardejov	Slovak.1	10	4	8	12	4	—	—	—	—	—
2013–14	MsHK Žilina	Slovak	25	12	10	22	30	—	—	—	—	—
2014–15	HK Nitra	Slovak	53	14	22	36	60	12	4	4	8	6
2015–16	HK Nitra	Slovak	54	11	28	39	56	17	4	14	18	14
2016–17	HK Nitra	Slovak	55	26	28	54	107	13	3	7	10	2
2017–18	Yunost Minsk	BHL	21	8	8	16	22	—	—	—	—	—
2017–18	HK Nitra	Slovak	31	14	15	29	26	8	3	2	5	4
2018–19	HK Nitra	Slovak	56	14	29	43	119	18	1	5	6	8
2019–20	Bratislava Capitals	Slovak.1	46	26	44	70	52	—	—	—	—	—
2019–20	HC '05 Banská Bystrica	Slovak	5	0	2	2	6	—	—	—	—	—
2020–21	HK Nitra	Slovak	50	18	31	49	46	5	3	2	5	4
2021–22	HC Košice	Slovak	49	13	26	39	44	13	4	1	5	2
2022–23	HC Košice	Slovak	48	9	13	22	55	17	3	3	6	12
Slovak totals			732	194	306	500	851	161	39	59	98	179

=== International ===
Year	Team	Event	Result	GP	G	A	Pts	PIM
2006	Slovakia	WJC18	7th	6	0	1	1	4
2008	Slovakia	WJC	7th	6	2	7	9	12
Junior totals				12	2	8	10	16

== Awards and honors ==
Award	Year
Slovak
Champion	2014, 2016, 2023
