= 1989–90 1. Slovenská národná hokejová liga season =

The 1989–90 1. Slovenská národná hokejová liga season was the 21st season of the 1. Slovenská národná hokejová liga, the second level of ice hockey in Czechoslovakia alongside the 1. Česká národní hokejová liga. 12 teams participated in the league, and Slovan ChZJD Bratislava won the championship and were promoted to the Czechoslovak First Ice Hockey League. Plastika Nitra was also promoted.

== Regular season ==
	Club	GP	W	T	L	Goals	Pts
1.	Slovan ChZJD Bratislava	44	32	5	7	251:104	69
2.	Plastika Nitra	44	32	4	8	212:142	68
3.	Spartak ZŤS Dubnica nad Váhom	44	23	7	14	210:171	53
4.	Partizán Liptovský Mikuláš	44	20	8	16	174:151	48
5.	Iskra Smrečina Banská Bystrica	44	20	8	16	179:182	48
6.	VTJ Topoľčany	44	20	7	17	184:149	47
7.	ZPA Prešov	44	17	9	18	161:171	43
8.	ČH PS Poprad	44	17	6	21	175:164	40
9.	VTJ Michalovce	44	15	5	24	159:206	35
10.	Štart Spišská Nová Ves	44	12	8	24	137:177	32
11.	ZTK Zvolen	44	11	6	27	130:202	28
12.	Slávia Ekonóm Bratislava	44	6	5	33	147:300	17
