= Andrej Kmec =

Slovak ice hockey player

- Born: July 24, 1977 (age 48) Nitra, Czechoslovakia
- Height: 6 ft 1 in (185 cm)
- Weight: 192 lb (87 kg; 13 st 10 lb)
- Position: Right wing
- Shot: Right
- Played for: HK Nitra; HK Dukla Trenčín; HC Slovan Bratislava; Bisons de Neuilly-sur-Marne
- Playing career: 1995–2014

Andrej Kmec (born July 24, 1977) is a Slovak former professional ice hockey right winger.

Kmec played a total of 486 regular season games in the Tipsport Liga over sixteen seasons, playing for HK Nitra, HK Dukla Trenčín and HC Slovan Bratislava.
