= Michal Fikrt =

Czech professional ice hockey player

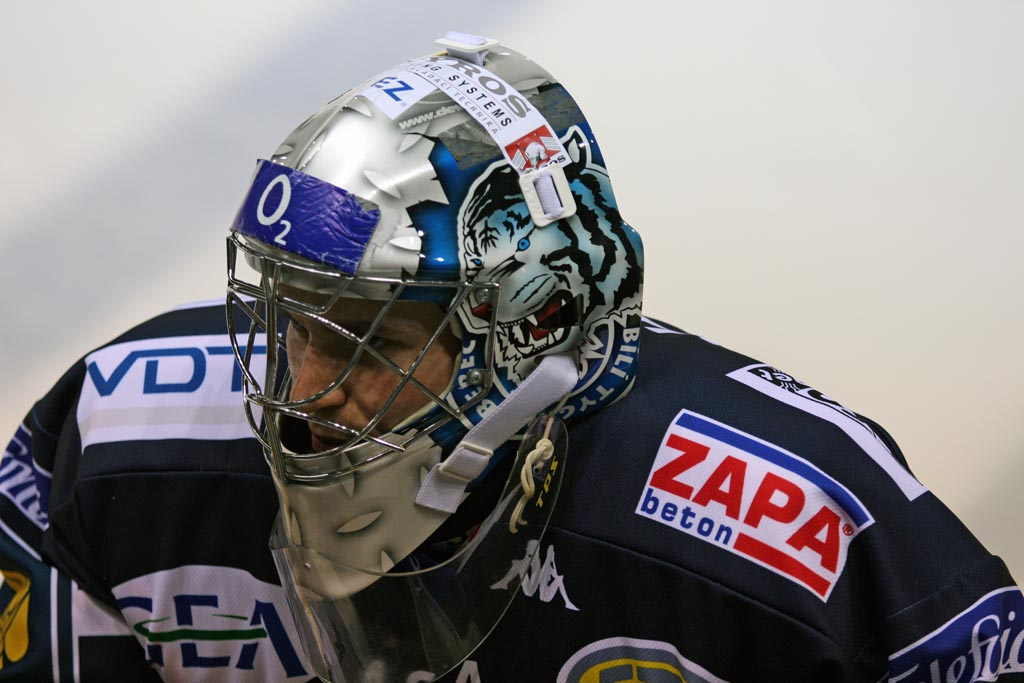
- Born: April 6, 1982 (age 44) Most, Czechoslovakia
- Height: 6 ft 0 in (183 cm)
- Weight: 187 lb (85 kg; 13 st 5 lb)
- Position: Goaltender
- Shoots: Left
- EBEL team Former teams: Acroni Jesenice; HC Liberec; HC Litvínov; HC Slovan Ústečtí Lvi; SK Kadaň; KLH Chomutov; HK Ardo Nitra; Metallurg Zhlobin, HC Vlci Jablonec nad Nisou
- Playing career: 2001–present

Michal Fikrt (born April 6, 1982) is a Czech professional ice hockey player. He plays goaltender for TH Unia Oświęcim in the Polska Liga Hokejowa.

== Clubs ==
Fikrt started out playing regularly for the juniors of HC Litvínov, later appearing regularly for HC Slovan Ústí nad Labem and SK Kadaň in the Czech First League (second division in the country). He had regular top-level experience in the Slovak Extraliga with HK Dynamax Nitra (now HK Ardo Nitra). Fikrt also made a few games for other clubs, usually as the cover.

== Country ==
He, along with teammate Martin Barek, were the goalies for the Czech Republic junior team in a 2000 5-nations tournament against their Swedish, Slovakian, Russian and Finnish counterparts. In this tournament Fikrt was voted goalie of the tournament, and the Czech team finished third, conceding 13 goals.

Fikrt also was with the junior team for 2002 World Junior Ice Hockey Championships, when Czech team was in third position.
