= 2000–01 Slovak 1. Liga season =

Slovak ice hockey league season

The 2000–01 Slovak 1.Liga season was the eighth season of the Slovak 1. Liga, the second level of ice hockey in Slovakia. 12 teams participated in the league, and MsHK Zilina won the championship.

== Standings ==
	Club	GP	W	T	L	Goals	Pts
1.	MsHK Žilina	40	34	3	3	223:65	71
2.	MHC Nitra	40	32	2	6	204:77	66
3.	HK VTJ Farmakol Prešov	40	27	3	10	182:93	57
4.	HK VTJ Spišská Nová Ves	40	20	5	15	132:113	45
5.	ŠaHK Iskra Banská Bystrica	40	18	6	16	153:122	42
6.	HC Dukla Senica	40	19	2	19	157:125	40
7.	HC Polygon Prievidza	40	18	4	18	138:150	40
8.	HC VTJ Topoľčany	40	13	4	23	136:164	30
9.	HK Spartak Dubnica	40	12	4	24	133:172	28
10.	HK VTJ Trebišov	40	6	3	31	91:252	15
11.	HK Dukla Michalovce	40	2	2	36	70:286	6
12.	HK Trnava	–	–	–	–	–:–	–
