= Brett Pollock =

Brett Pollock may refer to:

- Brett Pollock (footballer)
- Brett Pollock (ice hockey)
