= Juraj Štefanka =

Slovak ice hockey player

- Position: Forward
- Shoots: Left

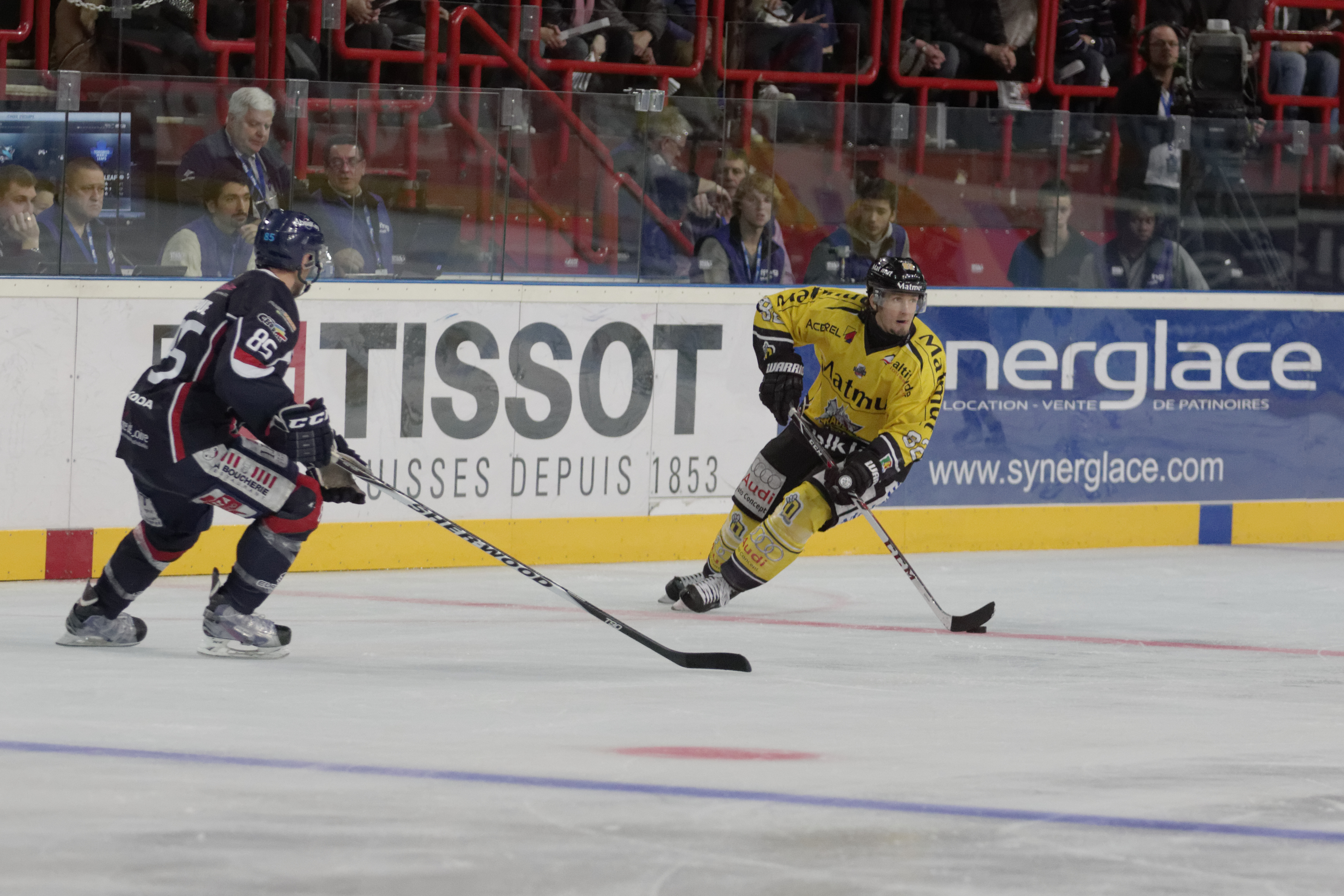

Juraj Štefanka (born 28 January 1976 in Nitra) is a Slovak professional ice hockey forward who currently plays in the Czech Extraliga.

Previously, Štefanka played for HC Slovan Bratislava, HC Karlovy Vary, HC Plzeň, HC Kladno, HC Vítkovice, HC Znojmo, HC Oceláři Třinec and HC Slavia Praha.

He also represented Slovakia at two IIHF World Championships in ice hockey.
