= 1st. Slovak National Hockey League =

- Sport: Ice hockey
- Founded: 1969
- Folded: 1993 (reorganized as Slovak 1. Liga)
- No. of teams: 8–12
- Country: Czechoslovakia
- Last champions: AC Nitra (1992–93)
- Most titles: HK Nitra (5 titles)

The 1st. Slovak National Hockey League was, along with the 1st. Czech National Hockey League, the second level of ice hockey in Czechoslovakia from 1969 to 1993. The league was made up only of Slovak teams.

== History ==
The precursor to the league was the Group D of the Czechoslovak 2. Liga, which consisted only of Slovak teams. In 1969, after the federalization of Czechoslovakia, two individual leagues were created, the 1. CNHL, and the 1. SNHL.

== Champions ==
Group D

- 1964 – Dukla Košice
- 1965 – Jednota Žilina
- 1966 – Dukla Trenčín
- 1967 – Dukla Nitra
- 1968 – Dukla Trenčín
- 1969 – Iskra Smrečina Banská Bystrica

1. SNHL

- 1969–70 – Lokomotíva Vagónka Stavbár Poprad
- 1970–71 – Dukla Trenčín
- 1971–72 – ŠK Liptovský Mikuláš
- 1972–73 – Lokomotíva Bučina Zvolen
- 1973–74 – ŠK Liptovský Mikuláš
- 1974–75 – Lokomotíva Bučina Zvolen
- 1975–76 – Lokomotíva Bučina Zvolen
- 1976–77 – Dukla Trenčín
- 1977–78 – Lokomotíva Bučina Zvolen
- 1978–79 – Spartak ZŤS Dubnica nad Váhom
- 1979–80 – Spartak ZŤS Dubnica nad Váhom
- 1980–81 – PS Poprad
- 1981–82 – Slovan ChZJD Bratislava
- 1982–83 – Dukla Trenčín
- 1983–84 – Plastika Nitra
- 1984–85 – PS Poprad
- 1985–86 – VTJ Michalovce
- 1986–87 – Plastika Nitra
- 1987–88 – Plastika Nitra
- 1988–89 – Partizán Liptovský Mikuláš
- 1989–90 – Slovan Bratislava
- 1990–91 – ŠKP PS Poprad
- 1991–92 – AC Nitra
- 1992–93 – AC Nitra
