= MHA Martin =

- City: Martin, Slovakia
- League: Slovak 1. Liga
- Founded: 1932
- Home arena: Martin Ice Stadium (capacity 4,200)
- Colours: Blue, white
- Head coach: (Slovakia) Daniel Babka
- Captain: (Slovakia) Michal Murček
- Website: www.hkmartin.sk

MHA Martin is a professional ice hockey team playing in the Slovak 1. Liga.

== History ==
The club was established in 1932 as Slávia Martin. Later the name was changed to Sokol, ŠK, ZŤS, Hutník, Martimex ZŤS, Martimex and MHC Martin (2000–2010). The Slávia, Sokol, ŠK (Športový klub - Sport Club), TJ (Telovýchovná jednota - bodybuilding unity) names are common names meaning sport organisation in Slovakia or Czechoslovakia. The names Hutnik, ZŤS and Martimex are connected to heavy industry companies, a major employer in the region from the 1930s to the 1990s, which was a general sponsors. Since the 2010/2011 season the name of the club has been MHC Mountfield. From 1970 the club played in the county league in 1.SNHL. In the 1992/1993 season, the hockey club advanced into the Slovak Extraliga. MHC Martin played in the Slovak Extraliga every season thereafter except in 1999/2000 and 2004/2005, which were spent in the 1st-division Slovak National Hockey League.

After years of economic stability, which was rare for this provincial team, the management, head coach Dušan Gregor and his predecessor Ladislav Spišiak, systematically built up the team and won the bronze medal in the 2009/10 season. The team consisted of former youth players like Jaroslav Markovič jr., Andrej Themár, and Miroslav Dzubina, experienced players Ivan Ďatelinka, David Appel, Michal Macho, and Jaroslav Jabrocký, and veterans Michal Beran, Peter Klepáč, Marek Uram and Karol Križan. The team clinched the play-off spot by finishing in 4th place in the regular season (74 points in 47 matches). In the first round, MHC Martin got by HK36 Skalica with legendary Žigmund Pálffy on its roster, beating them 4 games to 3. In the second leg, MHC Martin lost to future champions HC Košice 4 games to 1.

The women's team, MHK Martin have won the women's Extraliga 10 times between 1997–2009. The junior organizations have also made some achievements, sending a number of players (and for years also doctor MUDr. Dalimír Jančovič, who cooperated with MHC Martin) into Slovak national men's, women's and junior competition.

Before the 2017/18 season, the MHA Martin club, which operated in the top league for many years, was kicked out of the league after a financial collapse. In its place, a new men's senior club was established, HK Martin. In 2023, the club was dissolved.

== Honours ==
=== Domestic ===
Slovak Extraliga

- (bronze) 3rd place (2): 1993–94, 2009–10

Slovak 1. Liga

- (gold) Winners (1): 1999–2000
- (silver) Runners-up (2): 2018–19, 2021–22
- (bronze) 3rd place (3): 2004–05, 2020–21, 2022–23

Slovak 2. Liga

- (silver) Runners-up (1): 2017–18

1st. Slovak National Hockey League

- (silver) Runners-up (3): 1983–84, 1985–86, 1991–92
- (bronze) 3rd place (3): 1984–85, 1986–87, 1992–93

=== International ===
IIHF Continental Cup

- (gold) Winners (1): 2008–09

== Historical names ==
- Slávia Martin (1932–1939)
- Sokol Turčiansky Svätý Martin (1945–?)
- ŠK Martin (?)
- Spartak Martin (+/– 1957/58 +/–)
- TJ Hutník Martin (?–1969)
- Hutník Martin (1969/70)
- TJ Strojárne Martin (1970/71–1977)
- ZŤS Martin (1978–1989)
- HC Hutník ZŤS TS (1990–1992/1993)
- Martimex ZŤS Martin ()
- Martimex Martin ()
- MHC Martin (2000–2010)
- MHC Mountfield (2010–2016)
- MHK Martin (2017–2018)
- MHA Martin (2023–)

== Notable players ==
- Oto Haščák
- Rastislav Špirko
- Michal Macho
- František Skladaný
- Ján Tabaček
- Lukáš Kozák
- Richard Pánik
- Peter Bartoš
- Peter Smrek
- Zdeno Cíger
- Róbert Švehla
- Radovan Somík
- Peter Trokan
