= HK Spartak Dubnica nad Váhom =

- City: Dubnica nad Váhom, Slovakia
- League: Slovak 1. Liga
- Founded: 1942
- Home arena: Dubnica Ice Stadium (capacity 3,500)
- Colours: White, blue
- General manager: Roman Chatrnúch
- Head coach: Roman Stantien
- Website: www.mhkdubnica.sk

HK Spartak Dubnica nad Váhom is a professional ice hockey team playing in the Slovak 1. Liga, the second level of hockey in Slovakia. They play in the city of Dubnica nad Váhom, Slovakia.

== History ==
The club was founded in 1942. In the 1993–94 season team won first time title in Slovak 1. Liga. Next season the play in the top level of ice hockey in the country. The other achievements of team are winner of seasons 1998–99 and 2003–04 in Slovak 1. Liga. They also won 2 titles in Slovak 2. Liga the third tier of ice hockey in Slovakia during season 2013–14 and 2016–17.

== Honours ==
=== Domestic ===
Slovak 1. Liga

- (gold) Winners (3): 1993–94, 1998–99, 2003–04
- (silver) Runners-up (1): 2002–03
- (bronze) 3rd place (2): 1997–98, 2018–19

Slovak 2. Liga

- (gold) Winners (2): 2013–14, 2016–17

1st. Slovak National Hockey League

- (gold) Winners (2): 1978–79, 1979–80
- (silver) Runners-up (2): 1977–78, 1984–85
- (bronze) 3rd place (8): 1972–73, 1973–74, 1975–76, 1976–77, 1983–84, 1987–88, 1988–89, 1989–90
