= HC Prešov Penguins =

- City: Prešov, Slovakia
- Founded: 1928
- Folded: 2019
- Home arena: Ice Arena Prešov (capacity: 6,000)
- Colours: Blue, white, yellow
- Website: www.hcpresovpenguins.sk

Franchise history
- 1964: Tatran Prešov
- 1968: VTJ Dukla Prešov
- 1970: ZPA Prešov
- 1994: Dragon Prešov
- 1997: HK VTJ Prešov
- 1998: HK VTJ Farmakol Prešov
- 2003: PHK Prešov
- 2005: HK Lietajúce kone Prešov
- 2008–2015: HC Prešov 07
- 2015–2019: HC Prešov Penguins

HC Prešov Penguins was an ice hockey team which played in the 1. Liga, the second level of Slovak ice hockey, and was formed in 1928. They played in the city of Prešov, Slovakia at Ice Arena Prešov.

== Honours ==
=== Domestic ===
Slovak 1. Liga

- (silver) Runners-up (2): 1997–98, 2009–10
- (bronze) 3rd place (7): 1996–97, 2000–01, 2002–03, 2003–04, 2012–13, 2016–17, 2017–18

Slovak Hockey League

- (silver) Runners-up (2): 1939–40, 1940–41

== History ==
The club was founded in 1928 as Snaha Prešov. They changed their name many times since:

- 1931 – Slávia Prešov
- 1952 – ČSSZ Prešov
- 1953 – DŠO Tatran Prešov
- 1964 – Tatran Prešov
- 1968 – VTJ Dukla Prešov
- 1970 – ZPA Prešov
- 1970 – Sedlo Aréna
- 1994 – Dragon Prešov
- 1997 – HK VTJ Prešov
- 1998 – HK VTJ Farmakol Prešov
- 2003 – PHK Prešov
- 2006 – HK Lietajúce kone Prešov
- 2007 – HC 07 Prešov
- 2014 – PHK 3b Prešov
- 2015 – HC Prešov Penguins

== Achievements ==
- Promoted to the Slovak Extraliga: 1998
- Slovak 1.Liga champion: 2004

== Notable players ==
- Igor Liba
