= 1st. Czech National Hockey League =

- Sport: Ice hockey
- Founded: 1969
- Ceased: 1993 (reorganized as Czech 1.liga)
- Country: Czechoslovakia

The 1st. Czech National Hockey League was, along with the 1st. Slovak National Hockey League, the second level of ice hockey in Czechoslovakia from 1969 to 1993. The league was made up teams from the area of the modern Czech Republic.

== Champions ==
1. ČNHL

- 1969–70 –
- 1970–71 –
- 1971–72 –
- 1972–73 –
- 1973–74 – TJ Gottwaldov
- 1974–75 – TJ Ingstav Brno
- 1975–76 – TJ Gottwaldov
- 1976–77 – TJ Slezan STS Opava
- 1977–78 – TJ Gottwaldov
- 1978–79 –
- 1979–80 – TJ Gottwaldov
- 1980–81 – TJ Zetor Brno
- 1981–82 –
- 1982–83 –
- 1983–84 –
- 1984–85 –
- 1985–86 –
- 1986–87 –
- 1987–88 –
- 1988–89 –
- 1989–90 –
- 1990–91 –
- 1991–92 –
- 1992–93 –
