= Róbert Pukalovič =

Slovak ice hockey defenceman

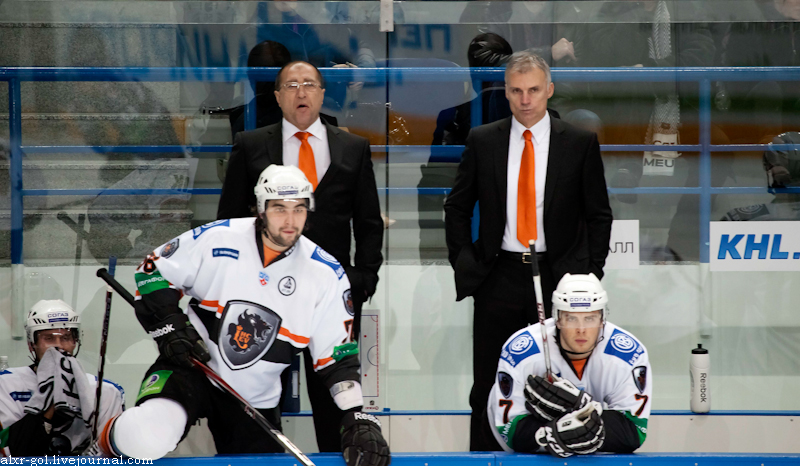
- On the right is Róbert Pukalovič
- Born: October 28, 1960 (age 64); Bratislava, Czechoslovakia
- Height: 6 ft 2 in (188 cm)
- Weight: 203 lb (92 kg; 14 st 7 lb)
- Position: Defence
- Shot: Right
- National team: Slovakia
- Playing career: 1979–2004

Róbert Pukalovič (born October 28, 1960) is a retired Slovak ice hockey defenceman and is now a head coach of the MHC Martin in the Slovak Extraliga. He has a son named Róbert who plays also for MHC Martin.

== Playing career ==
He played for HC Slovan Bratislava, HK Dukla Trenčín, HKm Zvolen and HK Nitra in Slovakia and for KalPa in the Finnish SM-liiga. He participated at the 1997 World Ice Hockey Championships for Slovakia, recording 1 point for assist.

== Career statistics ==
			Regular season					Playoffs
Season	Team	League	GP	G	A	Pts	PIM	GP	G	A	Pts	PIM
1979–80	HC Slovan Bratislava	Czech	31	2	1	3	14	—	—	—	—	—
1980–81	HC Slovan Bratislava	Czech	37	3	4	7	12	—	—	—	—	—
1981–82	HC Slovan Bratislava	Czech2	—	—	—	—	—	—	—	—	—	—
1982–83	HC Slovan Bratislava	Czech	43	5	8	13	22	—	—	—	—	—
1983–84	HC Slovan Bratislava	Czech	43	3	7	10	20	—	—	—	—	—
1984–85	HC Slovan Bratislava	Czech	27	2	4	6	18	—	—	—	—	—
1986–87	HK Dukla Trencin	Czech	27	3	4	7	20	—	—	—	—	—
1987–88	HC Slovan Bratislava	Czech	39	4	13	17	—	—	—	—	—	—
1988–89	HC Slovan Bratislava	Czech	24	5	5	10	20	—	—	—	—	—
1989–90	HC Slovan Bratislava	Czech2	—	—	—	—	—	—	—	—	—	—
1990–91	JHK	2. Divisioona	34	32	57	89	49	—	—	—	—	—
1992–93	Junkkarit HT	I-Divisioona	41	16	30	46	16	—	—	—	—	—
1993–94	Junkkarit HT	I-Divisioona	42	11	21	32	34	—	—	—	—	—
1993–94	KalPa	Liiga	1	0	2	2	0	—	—	—	—	—
1994–95	Junkkarit HT	I-Divisioona	31	16	21	37	10	—	—	—	—	—
1994–95	KalPa	Liiga	12	3	1	4	0	3	0	1	1	4
1995–96	HK Dukla Trencin	Slovak	46	7	19	26	18	—	—	—	—	—
1996–97	HK Dukla Trencin	Slovak	38	10	27	37	33	—	—	—	—	—
1997–98	HC Slovan Bratislava	Slovak	44	7	23	30	16	—	—	—	—	—
1998–99	HC Slovan Bratislava	Slovak	38	3	15	18	32	—	—	—	—	—
1999–00	HKM Zvolen	Slovak	48	7	30	37	18	10	0	2	2	2
2000–01	HKM Zvolen	Slovak	51	15	35	50	20	10	3	3	6	6
2001–02	HKM Zvolen	Slovak	42	7	14	21	16	—	—	—	—	—
2002–03	HKM ZVolen	Slovak	45	4	12	16	16	7	0	2	2	4
2003–04	HK Nitra	Slovak	44	3	13	16	34	—	—	—	—	—
Slovak totals			396	63	188	251	203	27	3	7	10	12
