= List of Olympic men's ice hockey players for Slovakia =

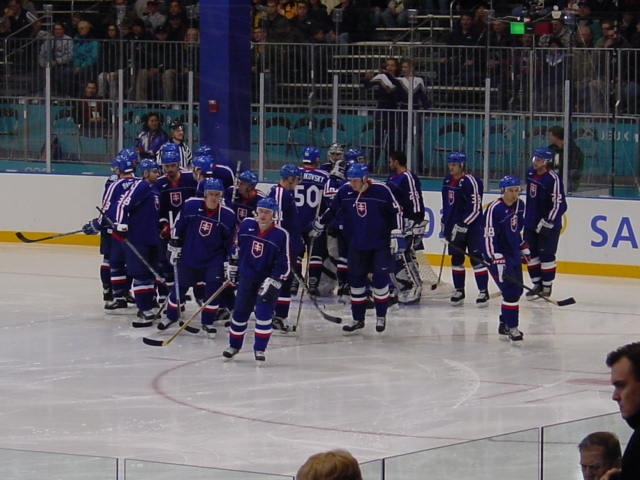
The Slovakia men's team at the 2002 tournament.

Men's ice hockey tournaments have been staged at the Olympic Games since 1920. The men's tournament was introduced at the 1920 Summer Olympics, and permanently added to the Winter Olympic Games in 1924. Slovakia has participated in 5 of 22 tournaments, sending 10 goaltenders and 61 skaters.

The Olympic Games were originally intended for amateur athletes, so the players of the National Hockey League (NHL) and other professional leagues were not allowed to compete. In 1986, the International Olympic Committee (IOC) voted to allow all athletes to compete in Olympic Games, starting in 1988. The NHL decided not to allow all players to participate in 1988, 1992 or 1994, because doing so would force the league to halt play during the Olympics. An agreement was reached in 1995 that allowed NHL players to compete in the Olympics, starting with the 1998 Games in Nagano, Japan. Slovak players were a part of the Czechoslovakia men's national ice hockey team until the dissolution of Czechoslovakia in 1993 separated the countries. The Czech Republic men's national ice hockey team was considered the successor to Czechoslovakia, while Slovakia was treated as a "new" country for the purposes of the International Ice Hockey Federation, and forced to work its way up through the ranks. Despite this, Slovakia qualified for the 1994 tournament, and finished in a respectable sixth place. At the 2002 tournament, the preliminary round was scheduled without the participation of NHL players. This negatively impacted the Slovak team, which relied heavily on NHL players; as a result, the team finished 13th in the tournament. Today, however, Slovakia is often contender for a medal at international tournaments. National teams are co-ordinated by Slovak Ice Hockey Federation and players are chosen by the team's management staff.

The Slovaks have won only one medal in an Olympic tournament. Their best finish was in third place at the 2022 Winter Olympics. Peter Šťastný is the only Slovak player to have been inducted into the Hockey Hall of Fame and the IIHF Hall of Fame. Miroslav Šatan holds the record for most games played, having dressed for 22 games in 1994, 2002, 2006 and 2010; he and Ľubomír Višňovský are the only players to participate in four tournaments. Marián Hossa leads Slovak Olympians in goals (12) and points (25), while Pavol Demitra has 14 assists, more than any other player.

== Key ==
General terms
Term	Definition
GP	Games played
HHOF	Hockey Hall of Fame
IIHFHOF	International Ice Hockey Federation Hall of Fame
Olympics	Number of Olympic Games tournaments
Ref(s)	Reference(s)

Goaltender statistical abbreviations
Abbreviation	Definition
W	Wins
L	Losses
T	Ties
Min	Minutes played
SO	Shutouts
GA	Goals against
GAA	Goals against average

Skater statistical abbreviations
Abbreviation	Definition
G	Goals
A	Assists
P	Points
PIM	Penalty minutes
—	Not applicable

== Goaltenders ==
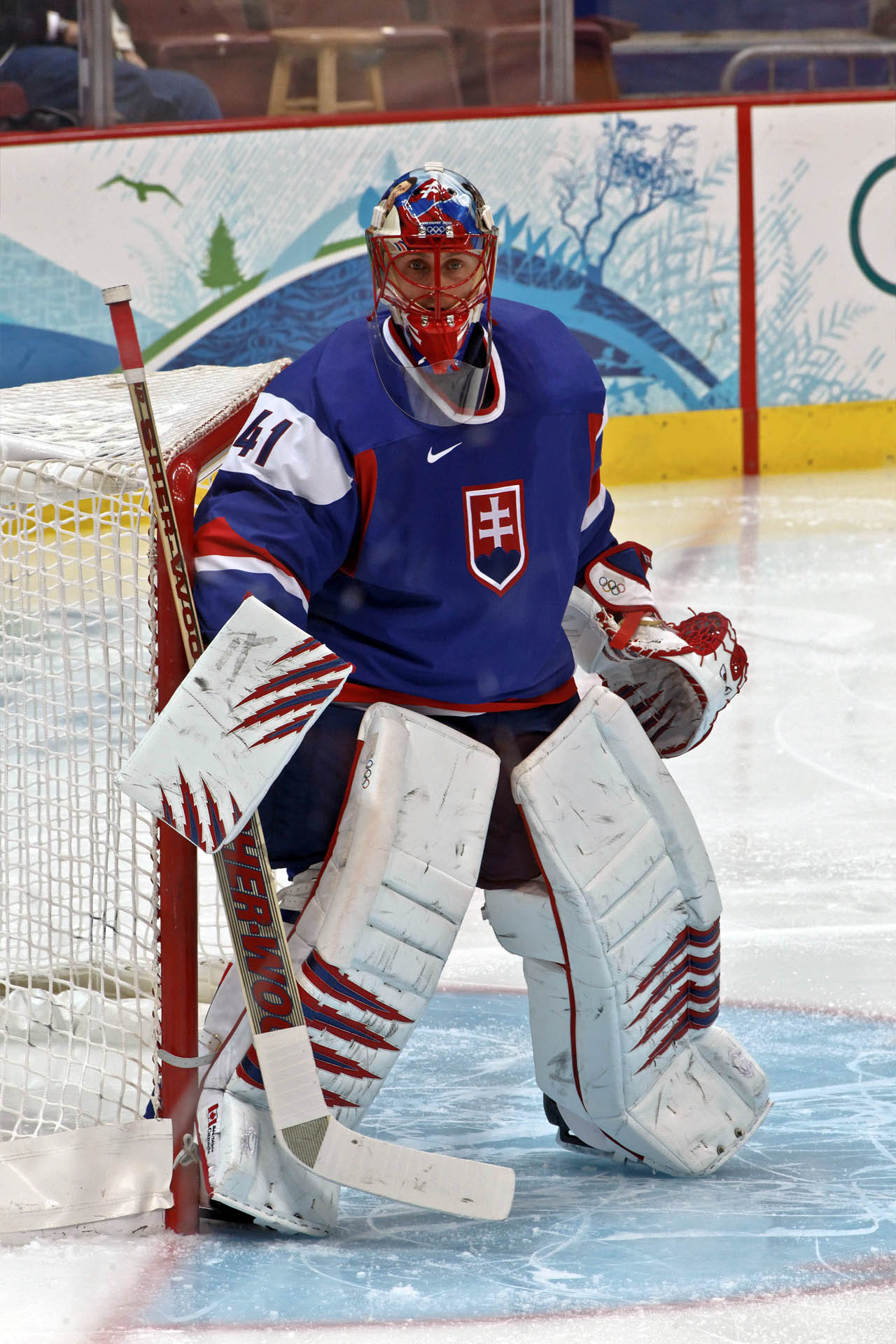
Jaroslav Halák is the winningest Slovak goalie, with 4 wins in 7 games.

Goaltenders
Player	Olympics	Tournaments	GP	W	L	T	Min	SO	GA	GAA	Medals	Notes	Ref(s)
Peter Budaj	1	2006	3	2	1	0	179	0	6	2.01			
Jaromír Dragan	1	1994	2	1	0	0	80	0	7	5.25			
Jaroslav Halák	1	2010	7	4	3	0	423	1	17	2.41			
Eduard Hartmann	1	1994	6	2	2	2	310	0	17	3.29			
Karol Križan	1	2006	2	2	0	0	120	1	1	0.50			
Ján Lašák	2	2002, 2006	3	1	1	1	154	0	9	3.51			
Miroslav Michalek	1	1994	2	1	0	0	100	0	5	3.00			
Igor Murín	1	1998	4	1	2	1	240	0	13	3.25			
Pavol Rybár	1	2002	2	0	1	0	85	0	5	3.54			
Rastislav Staňa	1	2002	1	1	0	0	60	0	1	1.00			

=== Reserve goaltenders ===
These goaltenders were named to the Olympic roster, but did not receive any ice time during games. Pavol Rybár did not play in any games in the 1998 tournament, but did start games at later tournaments. Peter Budaj and Rastislav Staňa were named to the team at the 2010 tournament, but did not play any games.

Reserve goaltenders
Player	Tournaments	Medals	Notes	Ref(s)
Miroslav Šimonovič	1998			

== Skaters ==
Skaters
Player	Olympics	Tournaments	GP	G	A (Note: Assists were not uniformly recorded until the 1932 tournament.)	P	PIM	Medals	Notes	Ref(s)
Jerguš Bača	1	1994	8	1	2	3	10			
Ivan Baranka	1	2010	7	1	0	1	0			
Ľuboš Bartečko	3	2002, 2006, 2010	17	0	2	2	6			
Peter Bondra	2	1998, 2006	8	5	0	5	27			
Vladimír Búřil	1	1994	4	0	0	0	0			
Zdeno Chára	2	2006, 2010	13	1	4	5	8		Team Captain (2010)	
Martin Cibák	1	2010	7	0	0	0	6			
Zdeno Cíger	1	1998	4	1	1	2	4		Team Captain (1998)	
Jozef Daňo	2	1994, 1998	12	4	5	9	10			
Pavol Demitra	3	2002, 2006, 2010	15	6	14	20	6		Team Captain (2006)	
Ivan Droppa	1	1998	4	0	0	0	0			
Marián Gáborík	2	2006, 2010	13	7	5	12	10			
Michal Handzuš	2	2002, 2010	9	4	3	7	6			
Oto Haščák	2	1994, 1998	9	1	6	7	8			
Marcel Hossa	2	2006, 2010	13	0	1	1	0			
Marián Hossa	3	2002, 2006, 2010	15	12	13	25	10			
Branislav Jánoš	2	1994, 1998	12	2	4	6	6			
Stanislav Jasečko	1	1998	4	0	0	0	4			
Milan Jurčina	2	2006, 2010	13	0	1	1	10			
Richard Kapuš	2	2002, 2006	10	0	3	3	4			
Ľubomír Kolník	2	1994, 1998	12	4	1	5	4			
Roman Kontšek	2	1994, 1998	12	4	1	5	10			
Tomáš Kopecký	1	2010	7	1	0	1	2			
Richard Lintner	1	2002	4	1	1	2	0			
Ivan Majeský	2	2002, 2006	10	0	1	1	8			
Miroslav Marcinko	1	1994	8	0	1	1	6			
Stanislav Medrik	1	1994	8	0	0	0	4			
Andrej Meszároš	2	2006, 2010	13	0	2	2	8			
Dušan Milo	1	2002	2	0	2	2	2			
Miroslav Mosnar	1	1998	3	0	0	0	6			
Jaroslav Obšut	1	2002	4	0	0	0	2			
Žigmund Pálffy	3	1994, 2002, 2010	16	3	10	13	16			
Ján Pardavý	2	1998, 2002	8	3	1	4	14			
Rastislav Pavlikovský	1	2002	4	2	3	5	6			
Richard Pavlikovský	1	2002	4	0	0	0	4			
Róbert Petrovický	3	1994, 1998, 2002	16	4	8	12	20		Team Captain (2002)	
Ronald Petrovický	1	2006	6	1	0	1	2			
Vlastimil Plavucha	2	1994, 1998	9	4	0	4	2			
Dusan Pohorelec	1	1994	5	0	0	0	0			
Peter Pucher	1	1998	2	0	0	0	0			
Rene Pucher	1	1994	6	1	0	1	2			
Branko Radivojevič	1	2010	7	0	0	0	6			
Karol Rusznyák	1	1998	4	0	0	0	0			
Miroslav Šatan	4	1994, 2002, 2006, 2010	22	10	4	14	2			
Richard Šechný	1	2002	4	0	0	0	6			
Andrej Sekera	1	2010	7	1	0	1	0			
Ľubomír Sekeráš	2	1994, 1998	12	0	4	4	12			
Marián Smerčiak	1	1994	8	0	1	1	12			
Peter Smrek	1	2002	4	0	0	0	0			
Roman Stantien	1	1998	3	0	0	0	0			
Peter Šťastný	1	1994	8	5	4	9	9		Flag bearer (1994); Team Captain (1994); HHOF (1998); IIHFHOF (2000)	
Martin Štrbák	2	2006, 2010	13	0	1	1	4			
Jozef Stümpel	3	2002, 2006, 2010	12	3	5	8	0			
Radoslav Suchý	1	2006	6	1	1	2	0			
Tomáš Surový	1	2006	6	0	1	1	2			
Marek Svatoš	1	2006	6	0	0	0	0			
Róbert Švehla	2	1994, 1998	10	2	5	7	26			
Jaroslav Török	1	2002	4	0	0	0	0			
Ján Varholík	2	1994, 1998	10	0	0	0	16			
Ľubomír Višňovský	4	1998, 2002, 2006, 2010	19	4	4	8	2			
Richard Zedník	2	2006, 2010	13	3	4	7	18			

== See also ==
- Slovakia men's national ice hockey team
