= Jaroslav Török =

Slovak ice hockey player

Personal information
- Nationality: Slovak
- Born: 1 December 1971 (age 53); Martin, Czechoslovakia

Sport
- Sport: Ice hockey

Jaroslav Török (born 1 December 1971) is a Slovak ice hockey player. He competed in the men's tournament at the 2002 Winter Olympics.

== Career statistics ==
=== Regular season and playoffs ===
			Regular season					Playoffs
Season	Team	League	GP	G	A	Pts	PIM	GP	G	A	Pts	PIM
1990–91	AC/HC Nitra	TCH	9	0	1	1		—	—	—	—	—
1992–93	ASVŠ Dukla Trenčín	TCH	5	0	0	0		—	—	—	—	—
1992–93	HC Hutník ZŤS Martin	SVK.2	34	23	15	38		—	—	—	—	—
1993–94	HC Hutník ZŤS Martin	SVK	42	18	8	26		—	—	—	—	—
1994–95	Martinskeho hokeja club	SVK	20	3	4	7	34	3	0	0	0	8
1995–96	Martinskeho hokeja club	SVK	49	9	18	27	71	—	—	—	—	—
1996–97	Martinskeho hokeja club	SVK	51	16	27	43	88	—	—	—	—	—
1997–98	Martinskeho hokeja club	SVK	33	14	9	23	99	—	—	—	—	—
1998–99	HKm Zvolen	SVK	55	25	17	42	63	—	—	—	—	—
1999–2000	HKm Zvolen	SVK	52	16	28	44	48	10	2	7	9	18
2000–01	HKm Zvolen	SVK	52	16	28	44	48	4	0	3	3	6
2001–02	HKm Zvolen	SVK	46	29	22	51	40	—	—	—	—	—
2002–03	HKm Zvolen	SVK	46	14	22	36	38	9	4	1	5	12
2002–03	HKm Zvolen B	IEHL	1	0	0	0	4	—	—	—	—	—
2003–04	MsHK Žilina	SVK	29	4	12	16	39	—	—	—	—	—
2003–04	HKm Zvolen	SVK	11	2	7	9	20	—	—	—	—	—
2004–05	HKm Nitra	SVK	31	7	9	16	32	—	—	—	—	—
2004–05	HKm Zvolen	SVK	12	2	5	7	0	14	5	6	11	26
2005–06	MHC Martin	SVK	37	10	19	29	47	—	—	—	—	—
2005–06	HC Košice	SVK	2	1	1	2	4	—	—	—	—	—
2006–07	MHC Martin	SVK	52	20	19	39	50	4	1	1	2	2
2007–08	MHC Martin	SVK	48	16	23	39	50	7	5	1	6	8
2008–09	MHC Martin	SVK	41	8	31	39	123	—	—	—	—	—
2009–10	MsHK Garmin Žilina	SVK	8	0	1	1	4	—	—	—	—	—
2010–11	HC Tábor	CZE.2	29	10	10	20	22	—	—	—	—	—
SVK totals			707	226	303	529	961	51	17	19	36	80

=== International ===
Year	Team	Event	GP	G	A	Pts	PIM
2002	Slovakia	OG	4	0	0	0	0
