= Peter Klepáč =

Slovak ice hockey player

- Born: August 3, 1975 (age 50) Liptovský Mikuláš, Czechoslovakia
- Height: 5 ft 11 in (180 cm)
- Weight: 176 lb (80 kg; 12 st 8 lb)
- Position: Defence
- Shot: Left
- Played for: HK 32 Liptovský Mikuláš; HC Košice; HK Poprad; HKM Zvolen; MHC Martin; Bisons de Neuilly-sur-Marne
- NHL draft: Undrafted
- Playing career: 1993–2014

Peter Klepáč (born August 3, 1975) is a Slovak former professional ice hockey defenceman.

Klepáč played in the Tipsport Liga for HC Košice, HK 32 Liptovský Mikuláš, HK Poprad, HKM Zvolen and MHC Martin.

== Career statistics ==
			Regular season					Playoffs
Season	Team	League	GP	G	A	Pts	PIM	GP	G	A	Pts	PIM
1992–93	HK 32 Liptovsky Mikulas	Czechoslovak2	—	—	—	—	—	—	—	—	—	—
1993–94	HC Kosice	Slovak	20	1	0	1	—	—	—	—	—	—
1994–95	HK 32 Liptovsky Mikulas	Slovak	32	1	5	6	36	3	1	1	2	4
1995–96	HK 32 Liptovsky Mikulas	Slovak	44	1	13	14	67	—	—	—	—	—
1996–97	HC SKP Poprad	Slovak	46	5	14	19	46	—	—	—	—	—
1997–98	HK 32 Liptovsky Mikulas	Slovak	33	12	6	18	74	—	—	—	—	—
1998–99	HK 32 Liptovsky Mikulas	Slovak	45	5	17	22	83	—	—	—	—	—
1999–00	HK 32 Liptovsky Mikulas	Slovak	56	10	19	29	117	—	—	—	—	—
2000–01	HKM Zvolen	Slovak	45	7	12	19	77	4	0	0	0	0
2001–02	HKM Zvolen	Slovak	38	3	6	9	46	—	—	—	—	—
2002–03	HKM Zvolen	Slovak	49	0	16	16	127	8	0	0	0	10
2002–03	HKM Zvolen B	IEL	2	0	1	1	0	—	—	—	—	—
2003–04	HKM Zvolen	Slovak	44	5	10	15	79	17	2	4	6	18
2004–05	HK SKP Poprad	Slovak	29	1	5	6	20	—	—	—	—	—
2004–05	HKM Zvolen	Slovak	10	0	1	1	6	15	1	3	4	32
2004–05	HKM Zvolen B	Slovak2	6	2	4	6	6	6	1	5	6	8
2005–06	HKM Zvolen	Slovak	27	2	3	5	38	4	1	1	2	4
2005–06	MHC Martin	Slovak	25	7	11	18	88	—	—	—	—	—
2006–07	MHC Martin	Slovak	53	8	27	35	181	4	0	2	2	4
2007–08	MHC Martin	Slovak	43	5	14	19	98	3	1	1	2	0
2008–09	MHC Martin	Slovak	51	5	20	25	117	5	1	1	2	4
2009–10	MHC Martin	Slovak	45	5	21	26	82	3	0	2	2	4
2010–11	MHC Martin	Slovak	51	5	11	16	63	—	—	—	—	—
2011–12	HK 32 Liptovsky Mikulas	Slovak	10	2	6	8	12	—	—	—	—	—
2011–12	Bisons de Neuilly-sur-Marne	Ligue Magnus	16	0	4	4	28	—	—	—	—	—
2012–13	HK 32 Liptovsky Mikulas	Slovak2	23	2	13	15	24	5	0	1	1	4
2013–14	HK 32 Liptovsky Mikulas	Slovak2	19	0	3	3	34	—	—	—	—	—
Slovak totals			786	88	231	319	1,445	66	7	15	22	80
