= Richard Šechný =

Slovak ice hockey player

- Born: 19 October 1971 (age 54) Prešov, Czechoslovakia
- Height: 6 ft 4 in (193 cm)
- Weight: 209 lb (95 kg; 14 st 13 lb)
- Position: Centre
- Shoots: Left
- Slovak team Former teams: HKm Zvolen; HC Košice; HC Neftekhimik Nizhnekamsk; Podhale Nowy Targ; MHK Kežmarok; HK Poprad; HC '05 Banská Bystrica
- National team: Slovakia
- Playing career: 1994–present

Richard Šechný (born 19 October 1971 in Prešov) is a Slovak professional ice hockey player.

== Domestic career ==
He has played over 700 games in the Slovak Extraliga. He was twice named an all-star, lead the league in scoring, and led the league in assists. He also won a league title.

He also played for HC Neftekhimik Nizhnekamsk of the Russian Superleague.

== International career ==
He represented Slovakia at the 1999 IIHF World Championship as well as the 2002 Winter Olympics.

== Career statistics ==
=== Regular season and playoffs ===
			Regular season					Playoffs
Season	Team	League	GP	G	A	Pts	PIM	GP	G	A	Pts	PIM
1994–95	HC Košice	SVK	31	9	10	19	33	8	4	2	6	44
1995–96	HC Košice	SVK	42	14	16	30	51	—	—	—	—	—
1995–96	HC VTJ MEZ Michalovce	SVK.2	6	4	7	11	8	—	—	—	—	—
1996–97	HC Košice	SVK	51	13	24	37	30	—	—	—	—	—
1997–98	HC Košice	SVK	46	10	20	30	28	—	—	—	—	—
1998–99	HC VSŽ Košice	SVK	41	21	24	45	120	10	2	7	9
1999–2000	HKm Zvolen	SVK	49	24	31	55	48	10	5	2	7	10
2000–01	HKm Zvolen	SVK	53	24	46	70	64	10	9	10	19	10
2001–02	HKm Zvolen	SVK	43	26	35	61	120	—	—	—	—	—
2002–03	Nizhnekhimik Nizhnekamsk	RSL	9	3	0	3	6	—	—	—	—	—
2002–03	HKm Zvolen	SVK	31	15	18	33	56	7	1	2	3	4
2002–03	HKm Zvolen B	IEHL	1	0	0	0	0	—	—	—	—	—
2003–04	HKm Zvolen	SVK	43	13	35	48	72	13	2	9	11	20
2004–05	HKm Zvolen	SVK	50	12	29	41	56	17	6	8	14	20
2005–06	HKm Zvolen	SVK	51	14	37	51	132	4	0	2	2	0
2006–07	Podhale Nowy Targ	POL	4	0	0	0	4	—	—	—	—	—
2006–07	MHK Kežmarok	SVK.2	34	22	28	50	38	14	5	9	14	38
2007–08	MHK SkiPark Kežmarok	SVK	52	22	25	47	129	—	—	—	—	—
2008–09	HK Aquacity ŠKP Poprad	SVK	14	0	4	4	6	—	—	—	—	—
2008–09	MHK SkiPark Kežmarok	SVK	33	17	29	46	138	—	—	—	—	—
2009–10	HK Aquacity ŠKP Poprad	SVK	46	17	34	51	48	5	1	3	4	8
2010–11	HC ’05 Banská Bystrica	SVK	52	7	31	38	48	14	3	6	9	12
2011–12	HK Dukla Michalovce	SVK.2	17	7	12	19	50	8	2	4	6	22
2011–12	EV Bozen 84	ITA.2	18	10	11	21	62	—	—	—	—	—
2012–13	HK Dukla Michalovce	SVK.2	43	19	40	59	54	13	6	5	11	32
2013–14	HK Dukla Michalovce	SVK.2	43	26	35	61	68	15	4	8	12	48
2014–15	HK Dukla Michalovce	SVK.2	37	13	39	52	93	5	1	6	7	6
2015–16	HC Prešov Penguins	SVK.2	28	8	21	29	62	—	—	—	—	—
2015–16	HC 07 Detva	SVK.2	13	1	6	7	0	3	0	0	0	0
2016–17	HK Dukla Michalovce	SVK.2	2	0	0	0	4	—	—	—	—	—
2016–17	MHK Humenné	SVK.3	28	18	36	54	68	—	—	—	—	—
2017–18	MHK Humenné	SVK.3	27	16	36	52	87	—	—	—	—	—
2018–19	HKm Zvolen	SVK	1	0	0	0	0	—	—	—	—	—
SVK totals			729	258	448	706	1179	98	33	51	84	128
SVK.2 totals			234	109	195	304	399	58	18	32	50	146

=== International ===
Year	Team	Event	GP	G	A	Pts	PIM
1995	Slovakia	WC B	7	0	1	1	6
1999	Slovakia	WC	6	0	0	0	0
2002	Slovakia	OG	4	0	0	0	6
Senior totals			17	0	1	1	12
