= Ladislav Čierny =

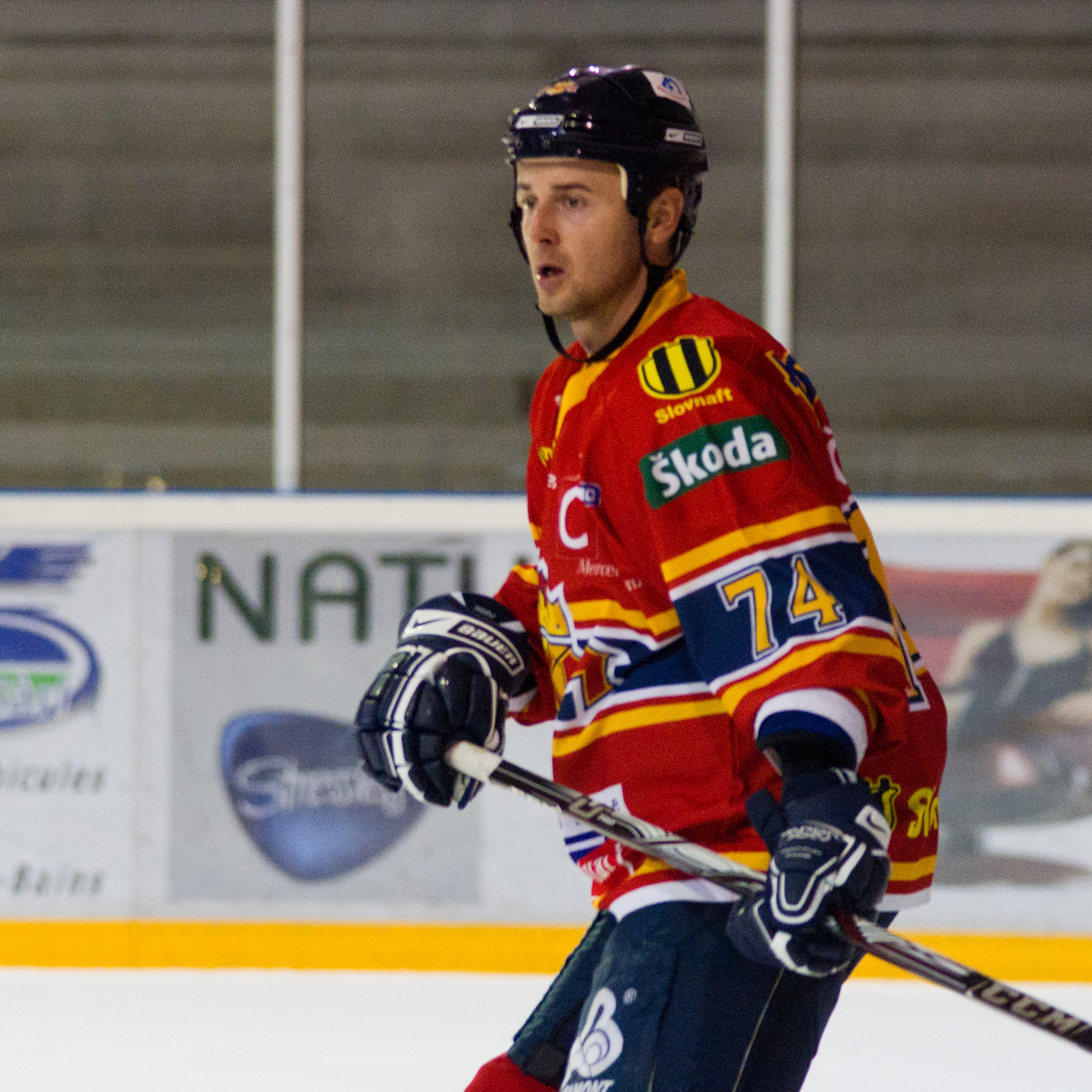
- Born: November 3, 1974 (age 50); Zvolen, Czechoslovakia
- Height: 6 ft 0 in (183 cm)
- Weight: 187 lb (85 kg; 13 st 5 lb)
- Position: Defence
- Shot: Left
- Played for: HKm Zvolen; HC Slovan Bratislava; Motor České Budějovice; HC Lada Togliatti; Severstal Cherepovets
- National team: Slovakia
- Playing career: 1993–2013

Ladislav Čierny (born November 3, 1974) is a Slovak former professional ice hockey defenceman.

Čierny played in the Slovak Extraliga for HKm Zvolen and HC Slovan Bratislava. He also played in the Czech Extraliga for Motor České Budějovice and the Russian Superleague for HC Lada Togliatti and Severstal Cherepovets.

Medal record

Representing Slovakia

Ice hockey

IIHF World Championships
Gold medal – first place	2002 Sweden	
Bronze medal – third place	2003 Finland	

== Career statistics ==
			Regular season					Playoffs
Season	Team	League	GP	G	A	Pts	PIM	GP	G	A	Pts	PIM
1993–94	HKM Zvolen	Slovak	24	2	0	2	—	—	—	—	—	—
1994–95	HC Slovan Bratislava	Slovak	31	4	6	10	14	—	—	—	—	—
1995–96	HC Slovan Bratislava	Slovak	49	3	7	10	18	—	—	—	—	—
1996–97	HKM Zvolen	Slovak2	14	3	9	12	8	—	—	—	—	—
1996–97	HKM Zvolen B	Slovak2	32	12	9	21	36	—	—	—	—	—
1997–98	HKM Zvolen	Slovak	41	3	11	14	52	—	—	—	—	—
1998–99	HKM Zvolen	Slovak	42	10	11	21	48	—	—	—	—	—
1999–00	HKM Zvolen	Slovak	55	7	13	20	67	—	—	—	—	—
2000–01	HC Ceske Budejovice	Czech	52	3	9	12	44	—	—	—	—	—
2001–02	HC Ceske Budejovice	Czech	48	3	19	22	62	—	—	—	—	—
2002–03	Lada Togliatti	Russia	49	5	7	12	38	10	3	2	5	12
2003–04	Lada Togliatti	Russia	59	3	7	10	58	6	0	1	1	6
2004–05	HKM Zvolen	Slovak	48	6	13	19	67	17	3	2	5	6
2005–06	Severstal Cherepovets	Russia	51	4	10	14	62	4	0	1	1	2
2006–07	Severstal Cherepovets	Russia	25	1	5	6	34	—	—	—	—	—
2006–07	HKM Zvolen	Slovak	18	4	2	6	18	10	1	1	2	28
2007–08	HKM Zvolen	Slovak	53	11	14	25	72	5	1	1	2	8
2008–09	HKM Zvolen	Slovak	55	11	20	31	88	13	1	4	5	12
2009–10	HKM Zvolen	Slovak	47	8	18	26	48	5	2	5	7	4
2010–11	HKM Zvolen	Slovak	55	11	13	24	46	7	1	3	4	29
2012–13	HKM Zvolen	Slovak	5	2	1	3	2	17	2	7	9	14
Slovak totals			523	82	129	211	540	74	11	23	34	101
