= Martin Bartek =

Slovak ice hockey player (born 1980)

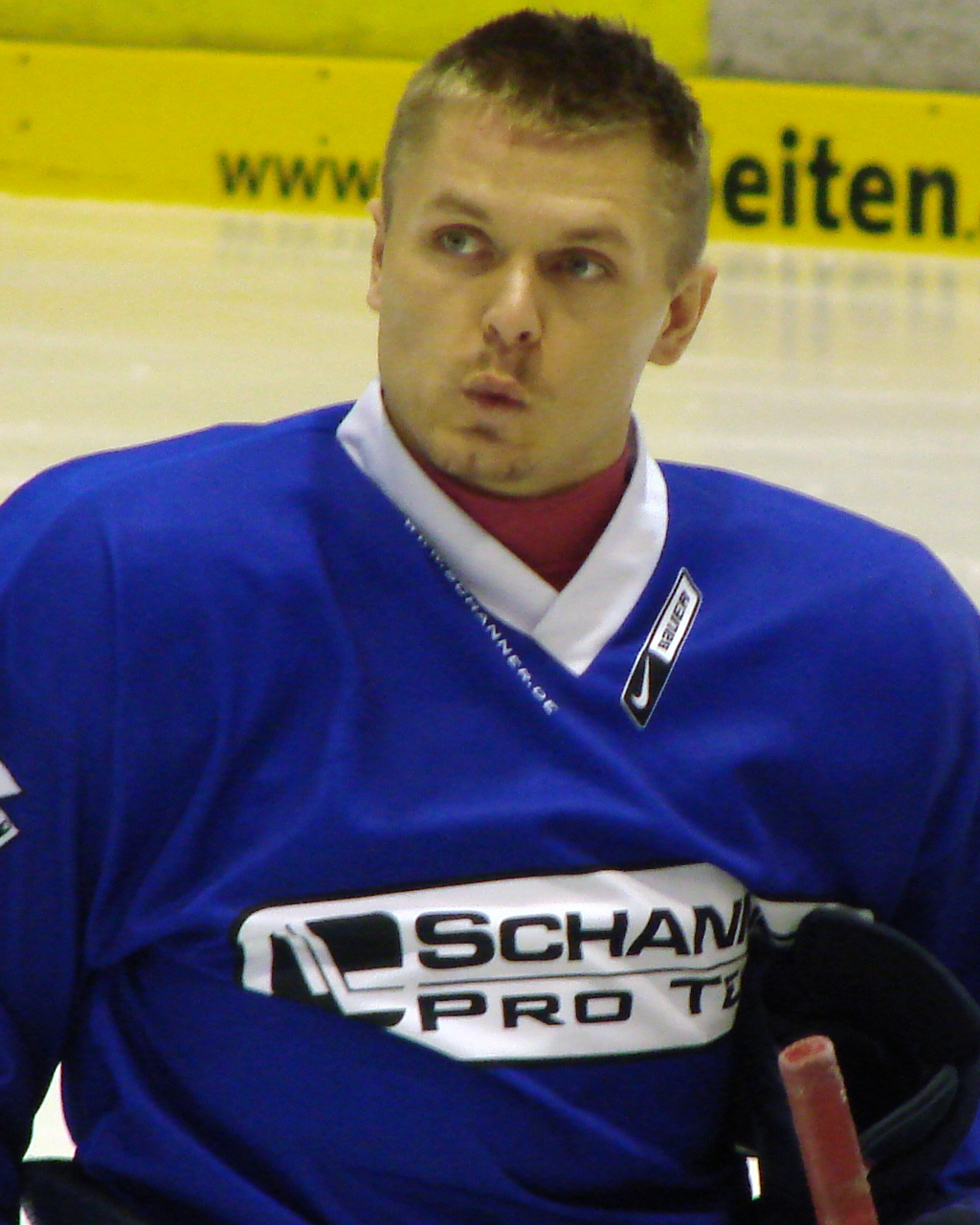
- Born: July 17, 1980 (age 45) Zvolen, Czechoslovakia
- Height: 6 ft 0 in (183 cm)
- Weight: 223 lb (101 kg; 15 st 13 lb)
- Position: Forward
- Shot: Left
- Played for: HKM Zvolen; Milwaukee Admirals; HC Hamé Zlín; Lukko; HC Slovan Bratislava; Metallurg Novokuznetsk; Füchse Duisburg; Leksands IF; Kölner Haie; HC Pardubice; HC Bílí Tygři Liberec; HC Karlovy Vary; HC 07 Detva
- National team: Slovakia
- NHL draft: 202nd overall, 1998; Nashville Predators
- Playing career: 1998–2018

Martin Bartek (born July 17, 1980) is a Slovak former professional ice hockey player. He last played for HC 07 Detva in the Slovak Extraliga.

Bartek previously played for HKm Zvolen, New Orleans Brass, Milwaukee Admirals, Cincinnati Cyclones, HC Hamé Zlín, Pensacola Ice Pilots, Richmond Renegades, Louisiana IceGators, Lukko Rauma, Metallurg Novokuznetsk, EV Duisburg, Leksands IF and HC Slovan Bratislava.

== Career statistics ==
=== Regular season and playoffs ===
			Regular season					Playoffs
Season	Team	League	GP	G	A	Pts	PIM	GP	G	A	Pts	PIM
1995–96	HKM Zvolen U18	Slovak U18	50	74	41	115	84	—	—	—	—	—
1995–96	HKM Zvolen U20	Slovak U20	2	0	0	0	6	—	—	—	—	—
1996–97	King's-Edgehill School U18	CAHS	35	45	40	85	32	—	—	—	—	—
1997–98	Rouyn-Noranda Huskies	QMJHL	28	9	19	28	12	—	—	—	—	—
1997–98	Sherbrooke Faucons	QMJHL	25	11	12	23	38	—	—	—	—	—
1997–98	Rimouski Oceanic	QMJHL	13	3	4	7	6	—	—	—	—	—
1997–98	HKM Zvolen	Slovak	1	0	0	0	0	—	—	—	—	—
1998–99	HKM Zvolen B	Slovak.1	2	1	0	1	2	—	—	—	—	—
1998–99	HKM Zvolen	Slovak	30	11	8	19	18	—	—	—	—	—
1999–00	Moncton Wildcats	QMJHL	69	32	44	76	36	16	10	13	23	24
2000–01	Milwaukee Admirals	IHL	14	1	0	1	2	—	—	—	—	—
2000–01	New Orleans Brass	ECHL	51	30	33	63	16	8	5	4	9	—
2001–02	Milwaukee Admirals	AHL	62	14	8	22	25	—	—	—	—	—
2001–02	Cincinnati Cyclones	ECHL	2	2	2	4	0	—	—	—	—	—
2002–03	Pensacola Ice Pilots	ECHL	19	10	11	21	26	—	—	—	—	—
2002–03	Richmond Renegades	ECHL	5	3	1	4	4	—	—	—	—	—
2002–03	Louisiana IceGators	ECHL	8	4	7	11	6	6	1	3	4	4
2002–03	HC Hamé Zlín	ELH	10	1	1	2	6	—	—	—	—	—
2003–04	HKM Zvolen	Slovak	49	38	36	74	36	16	8	16	24	28
2004–05	Lukko	Liiga	17	5	6	11	8	—	—	—	—	—
2004–05	HC Slovan Bratislava	Slovak	30	13	21	34	20	14	5	6	11	24
2005–06	Metallurg Magnitogorsk	RSL	26	2	5	7	16	—	—	—	—	—
2005–06	HKM Zvolen	Slovak	13	7	11	18	8	4	1	2	3	8
2006–07	Füchse Duisburg	DEL	37	10	16	26	22	—	—	—	—	—
2006–07	Leksands IF	Allsv	5	6	4	10	2	10	4	4	8	4
2007–08	Moskitos Essen	GBun.2	50	44	55	99	28	6	4	9	13	8
2008–09	Kassel Huskies	DEL	47	25	22	47	24	—	—	—	—	—
2009–10	Kölner Haie	DEL	54	21	25	46	12	—	—	—	—	—
2010–11	HC Eaton Pardubice	ELH	52	19	30	49	12	9	3	1	4	6
2011–12	HC ČSOB Pojišťovna Pardubice	ELH	28	11	12	23	12	19	8	14	22	10
2012–13	HC ČSOB Pojišťovna Pardubice	ELH	50	24	20	44	16	5	1	1	2	2
2013–14	Bili Tygri Liberec	ELH	48	28	18	46	53	3	0	1	1	2
2014–15	Bili Tygri Liberec	ELH	42	11	11	22	20	—	—	—	—	—
2014–15	HC Energie Karlovy Vary	ELH	9	5	2	7	0	—	—	—	—	—
2015–16	HC Energie Karlovy Vary	ELH	38	13	9	22	39	—	—	—	—	—
2016–17	Eispiraten Crimmitschau	DEL2	40	11	15	26	60	—	—	—	—	—
2017–18	HC 07 Detva	Slovak	2	0	0	0	0	—	—	—	—	—
ELH totals			277	112	103	215	158	47	18	19	37	26
DEL totals			138	56	63	119	58	—	—	—	—	—
Slovak totals			125	69	76	145	82	34	14	24	38	60
