= Jozef Čierny =

Slovak ice hockey player (born 1974)

- Born: May 13, 1974 (age 51) Zvolen, Czechoslovakia
- Height: 6 ft 2 in (188 cm)
- Weight: 190 lb (86 kg; 13 st 8 lb)
- Position: Left wing
- Shot: Left
- Played for: Edmonton Oilers
- NHL draft: 35th overall, 1992; Buffalo Sabres
- Playing career: 1992–2012

Jozef Čierny (Slovak pronunciation: [ˈjɔzef ˈtʂɪerni]; born May 13, 1974) is a Slovak retired professional ice hockey left winger.

== Career ==
He was drafted by the Buffalo Sabres in the second round, 35th overall, of the 1992 NHL entry draft. He appeared in just one game in the National Hockey League, appearing for the Edmonton Oilers during the 1993–94 NHL season. He went scoreless in the game, going -1 in a game against the Ottawa Senators.

Čierny played three seasons in Germany's Deutsche Eishockey Liga before playing for his hometown HKm Zvolen in the Slovak Extraliga. In November 2008, he received a try-out at Graz 99ers but was unsuccessful in obtaining a contract and instead signed a contract in January 2009 with HYS The Hague in Eredivisie.

== Career statistics ==
			Regular season					Playoffs
Season	Team	League	GP	G	A	Pts	PIM	GP	G	A	Pts	PIM
1991–92	ZTK Zvolen	Czech2	26	10	3	13	8	—	—	—	—	—
1992–93	Rochester Americans	AHL	54	27	27	54	36	—	—	—	—	—
1993–94	Edmonton Oilers	NHL	1	0	0	0	0	—	—	—	—	—
1993–94	Cape Breton Oilers	AHL	73	30	27	57	88	4	1	1	2	4
1994–95	Cape Breton Oilers	AHL	73	28	24	52	58	—	—	—	—	—
1995–96	Detroit Vipers	IHL	20	2	5	7	16	—	—	—	—	—
1995–96	Los Angeles Ice Dogs	IHL	43	23	16	39	36	—	—	—	—	—
1996–97	Los Angeles Ice Dogs	IHL	68	27	27	54	106	16	8	5	13	7
1997–98	Nuremberg Ice Tigers	DEL	45	19	22	41	36	1	1	0	1	25
1998–99	Nuremberg Ice Tigers	DEL	47	22	21	43	65	13	3	2	5	37
1999–00	Nuremberg Ice Tigers	DEL	55	15	11	26	62	—	—	—	—	—
2000–01	HKM Zvolen	Slovak	35	11	5	16	42	8	1	1	2	6
2000–01	HKM Zvolen B	Slovak2	1	0	0	0	0	—	—	—	—	—
2002–03	HKM Zvolen	Slovak	23	7	7	14	14	8	2	2	4	20
2002–03	HKM Zvolen B	IEL	4	1	1	2	2	—	—	—	—	—
2002–03	HKM Zvolen B	Slovak2	7	2	2	4	6	—	—	—	—	—
2003–04	HKM Zvolen	Slovak	54	18	11	29	38	17	0	3	3	33
2004–05	HKM Zvolen	Slovak	21	3	3	6	4	—	—	—	—	—
2004–05	AaB Ishockey	Denmark	16	2	4	6	4	15	3	4	7	24
2005–06	HKM Zvolen	Slovak	43	8	12	20	34	4	2	0	2	2
2005–06	HC Banska Bystrica	Slovak2	2	2	2	4	0	—	—	—	—	—
2006–07	HKM Zvolen	Slovak	50	9	7	16	18	10	3	2	5	6
2007–08	HKM Zvolen	Slovak	54	16	27	43	40	6	1	4	5	2
2008–09	HKM Zvolen	Slovak	17	0	4	4	12	—	—	—	—	—
2008–09	HK Detva	Slovak2	2	1	1	2	0	—	—	—	—	—
2008–09	Graz 99ers	EBEL	10	2	1	3	6	—	—	—	—	—
2008–09	HYS The Hague	Netherlands	16	9	19	28	29	10	3	8	11	2
2009–10	Tölzer Löwen	Germany3	11	4	15	19	4	—	—	—	—	—
2010–11	HK Spisska Nova Ves	Slovak2	31	15	12	27	30	5	1	2	3	6
2011–12	SCM Brasov	Erste Liga	3	1	1	2	0	—	—	—	—	—
2011–12	HK Michalovce	Slovak2	4	1	0	1	0	5	0	0	0	2
AHL totals			200	85	78	163	182	4	1	1	2	4

== See also ==
- List of players who played only one game in the NHL
