= Peter Pucher =

Slovak professional ice hockey forward (born 1974)

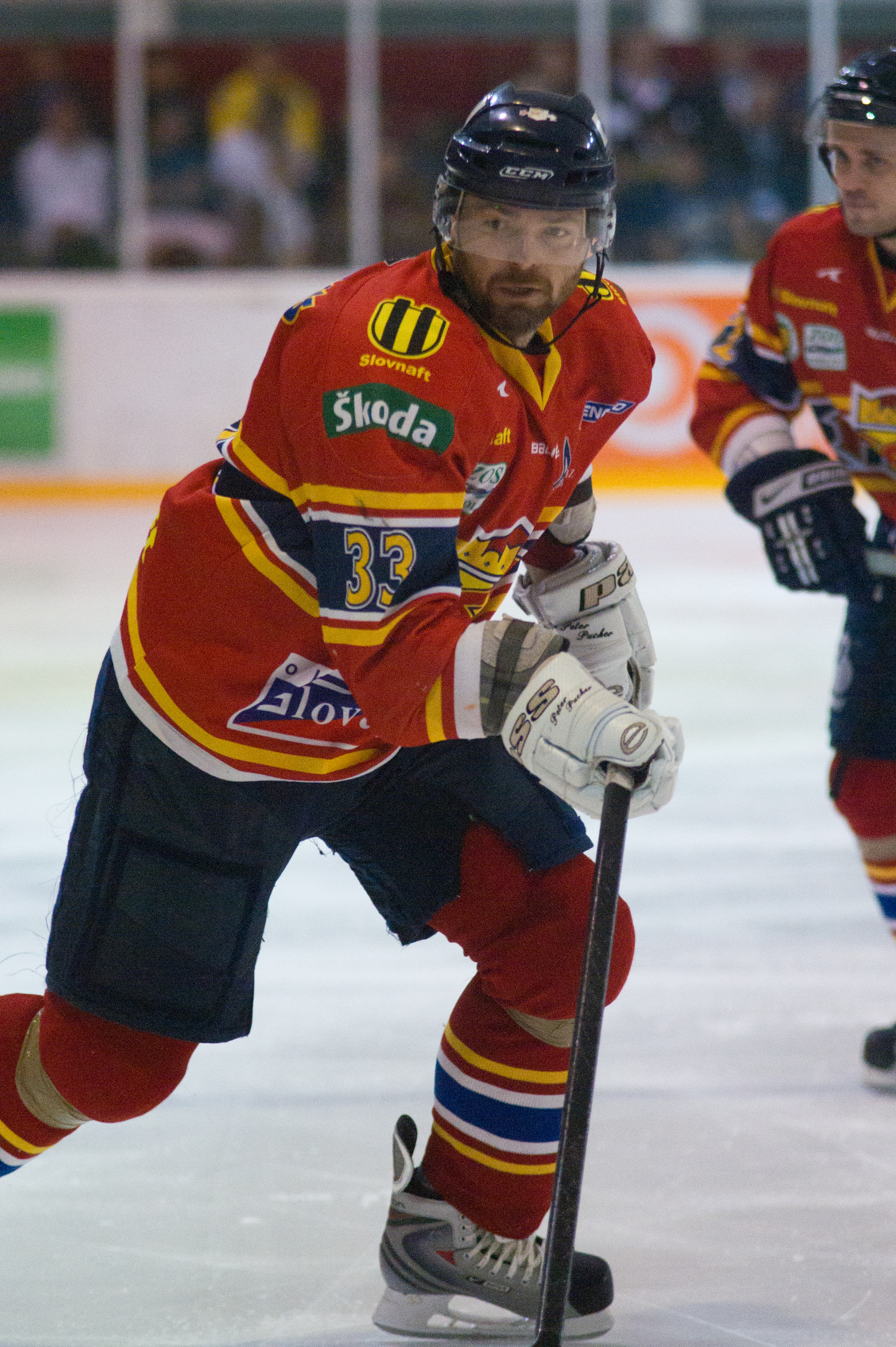
- Born: August 12, 1974 (age 51) Prešov, Czechoslovakia
- Height: 6 ft 0 in (183 cm)
- Weight: 231 lb (105 kg; 16 st 7 lb)
- Position: Forward
- Shoots: Left
- EBEL team Former teams: Orli Znojmo; HC 07 Prešov; HK ŠKP Poprad; HC Košice; HC Pardubice; HC Kometa Brno; HKm Zvolen
- National team: Slovakia
- Playing career: 1993-2018–present

Peter Pucher (born August 12, 1974 in Prešov, Czechoslovakia) is a Slovak professional ice hockey forward. He currently plays for Orli Znojmo in the Austrian Hockey League (EBEL). He returned to Znojmo after a season in the Slovak Extraliga with HKm Zvolen in 2010–11.

== Career statistics ==
=== Regular season and playoffs ===
			Regular season					Playoffs
Season	Team	League	GP	G	A	Pts	PIM	GP	G	A	Pts	PIM
1993–94	ZPA Prešov	SVK	32	15	6	21	—	—	—	—	—	—
1994–95	Dragon Prešov	SVK	36	15	11	26	12	3	3	0	3	2
1995–96	Dragon Prešov	SVK	33	15	14	29	60	—	—	—	—	—
1996–97	HC Košice	SVK	53	17	38	55	26	—	—	—	—	—
1996–97	Dragon Prešov	SVK II	1	1	0	1	2	—	—	—	—	—
1997–98	HC Košice	SVK	36	16	30	46	10	10	4	4	8	2
1998–99	HC Košice	SVK	42	15	18	33	28	11	8	6	14	—
1999–2000	HC Excalibur Znojemští Orli	ELH	52	17	17	34	24	—	—	—	—	—
2000–01	HC Excalibur Znojemští Orli	ELH	52	22	34	56	32	7	0	1	1	6
2001–02	HC JME Znojemští Orli	ELH	49	16	38	54	10	7	4	4	8	2
2002–03	HC JME Znojemští Orli	ELH	52	13	27	40	30	6	1	3	4	2
2003–04	HC JME Znojemští Orli	ELH	52	13	42	55	18	7	2	4	6	0
2004–05	HC JME Znojemští Orli	ELH	52	16	29	45	18	—	—	—	—	—
2005–06	HC JME Znojemští Orli	ELH	50	18	24	42	20	11	2	3	5	2
2006–07	HC JME Znojemští Orli	ELH	30	5	10	15	24	—	—	—	—	—
2006–07	HC Moeller Pardubice	ELH	17	3	12	15	8	18	1	6	7	4
2007–08	HC Moeller Pardubice	ELH	48	6	14	20	22	—	—	—	—	—
2008–09	HC Moeller Pardubice	ELH	26	7	13	20	8	—	—	—	—	—
2008–09	HC Kometa Brno	CZE II	2	0	1	1	0	14	4	7	11	6
2009–10	HC Kometa Brno	ELH	15	1	2	3	10	—	—	—	—	—
2009–10	HKm Zvolen	SVK	29	9	20	29	6	5	3	4	7	4
2010–11	HKm Zvolen	SVK	56	10	22	32	16	7	0	2	2	10
2011–12	Orli Znojmo	AUT	46	13	23	36	16	4	0	1	1	6
2012–13	Orli Znojmo	AUT	43	11	24	35	14	5	0	1	1	0
2013–14	Orli Znojmo	AUT	48	13	23	36	14	5	1	1	2	6
2014–15	Orli Znojmo	AUT	46	16	29	45	14	2	1	2	3	0
2015–16	Orli Znojmo	AUT	53	10	42	52	16	18	2	9	11	12
2016–17	Orli Znojmo	AUT	51	4	23	27	20	4	0	2	2	2
2017–18	HC Moravské Budějovice 2005	CZE III	34	14	20	34	14	7	3	4	7	2
SVK totals			317	112	159	271	158	36	18	16	34	18
ELH totals			495	137	262	399	224	56	10	21	31	16
AUT totals			287	67	164	231	94	38	4	16	20	26

=== International ===
Year	Team	Event	GP	G	A	Pts	PIM
1997	Slovakia	WC	8	0	0	0	0
1998	Slovakia	OG	2	0	0	0	0
1999	Slovakia	WC	6	0	1	1	0
2000	Slovakia	WC	9	2	1	3	4
2001	Slovakia	WC	7	3	2	5	2
2002	Slovakia	WC	6	0	2	2	4
2005	Slovakia	WC	7	0	3	3	2
Senior totals			45	5	9	14	12
