= Viedenský =

Viedenský is a surname. Notable people with the surname include:

- Marek Viedenský (born 1990), Slovak ice hockey player
- Matúš Viedenský (born 1992), Slovak ice hockey player
