= HKM Zvolen =

Slovak ice hockey team

- Nickname: Rytieri
- City: Zvolen, Slovakia
- League: Slovak Extraliga
- Founded: 1927; 99 years ago
- Home arena: Zvolen Ice Stadium (capacity 5,675)
- Colours: Blue, yellow, red
- President: Dušan Mráz
- General manager: Ladislav Čierny
- Head coach: Martin Štrba
- Captain: Andrej Kudrna
- Farm club: HK MŠK Indian Žiar nad Hronom
- Website: www.hkmzvolen.sk

Hokejový Klub HKM a.s. Zvolen is a professional Slovak ice hockey club based in Zvolen. The club has won the Slovak league championship three times (2001, 2013, 2021) and the IIHF Continental Cup in 2005. The team is nicknamed Rytieri (Knights).

== History ==
=== Previous names ===
- ZTK Zvolen (1927 – 1964)
- LB Zvolen (1964 – 1983)
- ZTK Zvolen (1983 – 1993)
- HK Hell Zvolen (1994)
- HKm Zvolen (1995 – 2005)
- HKM a.s. Zvolen (since 2006)

=== Early history ===
The club was founded on 18 March 1927 as ZTC Zvolen. However, they played their first official game in 1932 against Slávia Banská Bystrica. They lost 0–18 in the first game and 1–20 in the second game against Slávia. Zvolen played their first home game on 14 February 1932. They lost 0–2 against Slávia. In the 1933–34 season they played for the first time in organized competition, the Championship of Stredoslovenská župa. In the next season they won their first official game against Sokol Kremnica. Hockey in Zvolen was even played during World War II. After WW II they had very successful years between 1947 and 1953. Then there was a decline.

=== Czechoslovak era ===
Renewal of hockey in Zvolen started in 1964, when the Lokomotíva Bučina Zvolen club was established. In 1970 they promoted to the 1. SNHL (1st. Slovak National Hockey League), second level of Czechoslovak hockey. They placed 6th in their first season at the 1. SNHL. In the 1971–72 season they finished 3rd and in the next season they won the 1. SNHL. The club's scoring leader was Jozef Golonka. Zvolen qualified for the preliminary round of the Czechoslovak Extraliga. There they lost 7 of 8 games and were not promoted to the Extraliga. Zvolen won the 1. SNHL again in the 1974–75 season. Zvolen forward Ján Letko was the top scorer of the 1. SNHL (48 goals). However, they lost in the preliminary round against Ingstav Brno and were not promoted to the Extraliga. In the 1975–76 season they repeated victory in the 1. SNHL. In the preliminary round they lost a series 3–4 against TJ Gottwaldov. Their fourth and last victory of the 1. SNHL came in the 1977–78 season, but in the preliminary round they lost a series 2–4 against TJ Gottwaldov. Thus Zvolen never played in the Czechoslovak Extraliga, the top level of Czechoslovak hockey.

=== Slovak era ===
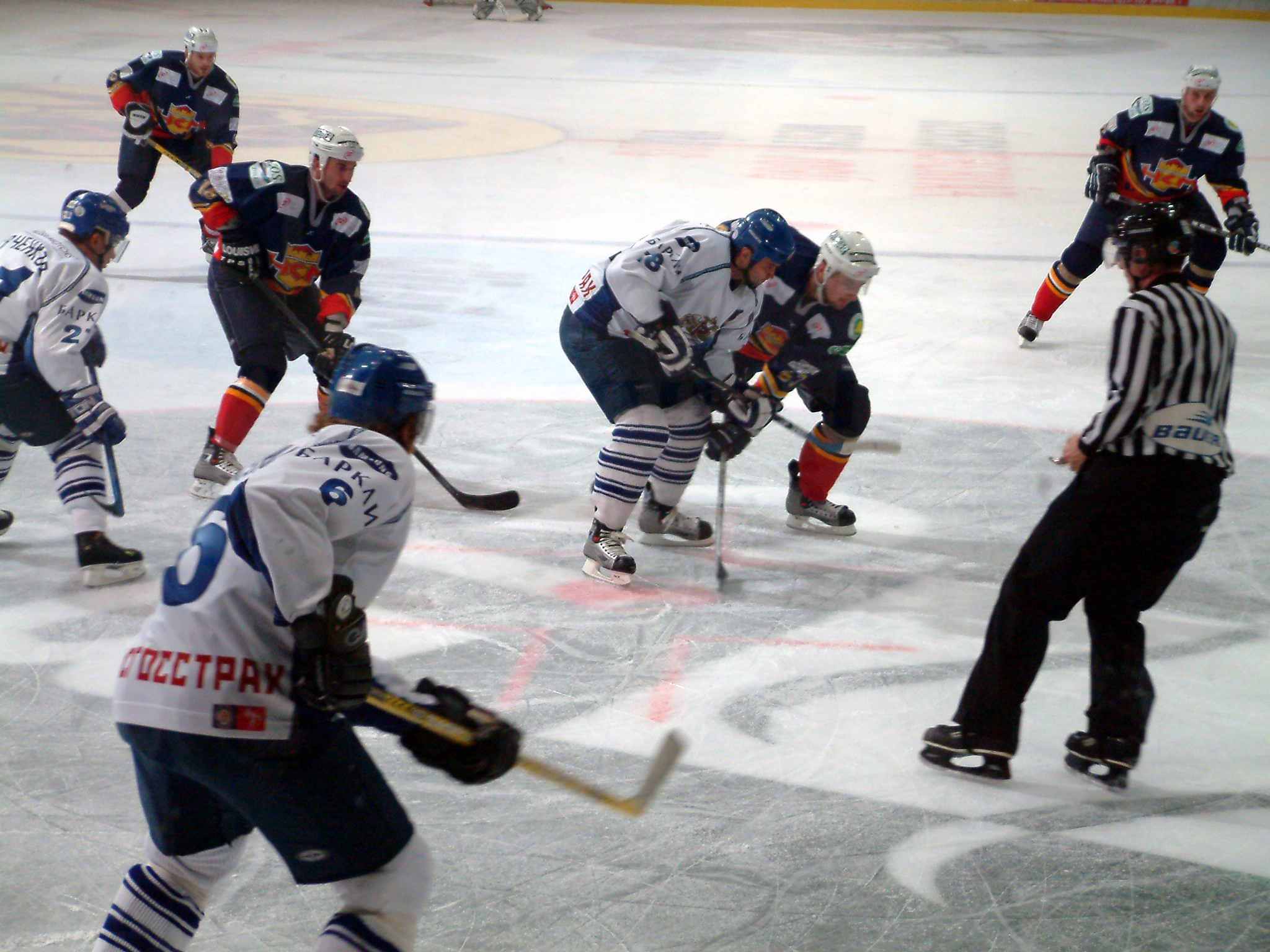
Zvolen (in blue) vs. Dynamo Moscow at the 2004–05 IIHF Continental Cup

Zvolen was a member of the inaugural season of the Slovak Extraliga, but they finished last and were relegated to the Slovak 1.Liga. Zvolen won the 1996–97 Slovak 1.Liga season and promoted to the Extraliga after 3 years. In the 1997–98 season they placed fifth in the regular season and were eliminated by Dukla Trenčín in the quarterfinals. In the next season they progressed to the semifinals, beating Trenčín in the quarterfinals, but were defeated by Slovan Bratislava. Zvolen played in the playoffs finals for the first time in club history in the 1999–00 season. There they lost 2–3 against Slovan. The most successful season in the club history was the 2000–01 season. Zvolen finished first in the regular season, defeated 3–0 MHC Martin in the quarterfinals, 3–0 HK Poprad in the semifinals, 3–1 Dukla Trenčín in the finals and won their first Slovak Extraliga title ever. Ján Plch (79 pts), Richard Šechný (70 pts) and Petr Vlk (64 pts) were the top three scoring leaders of the Extraliga regular season. Šechný (19 pts) was also a scoring leader in the playoffs. Since 2001 Zvolen was playoffs finalist four times but won the title only once more in the 2012–13 season.

=== Continental Cup ===
Besides their triumph at the Slovak championship in 2001, Zvolen is a winner of the IIHF Continental Cup. In the 8th edition of the cup in 2005 they played in the final stage against HC Dynamo Moscow, Alba Volán Székesfehérvár and the Milano Vipers. Zvolen won all three games and became the third Slovak winner after HC Košice and HC Slovan Bratislava.

== Honours ==
=== Domestic ===
Slovak Extraliga

- (gold) Winners (3): 2000–01, 2012–13, 2020–21
- (silver) Runners-up (5): 1999–2000, 2001–02, 2003–04, 2004–05, 2022–23
- (bronze) 3rd place (3): 2002–03, 2018–19, 2021–22

Slovak 1. Liga

- (gold) Winners (1): 1996–97
- (silver) Runners-up (2): 1994–95, 1995–96

1st. Slovak National Hockey League

- (gold) Winners (4): 1972–73, 1974–75, 1975–76, 1977–78
- (silver) Runners-up (3): 1973–74, 1976–77, 1980–81
- (bronze) 3rd place (1): 1971–72

=== International ===
IIHF Continental Cup

- (gold) Winners (1): 2004–05
- (bronze) 3rd place (1): 2001–02

=== Pre-season ===
Rona Cup

- (gold) Winners (2): 2001, 2008

== Players ==
=== Current roster ===
As of 14 December 2024.

No.	Nat	Player	Pos	S/G	Age	Acquired	Birthplace
73	(Slovakia)	Michal Beno	D	L	24	2024	Želiezovce, Slovakia
4	(Latvia)	Kristofers Bindulis	D	L	30	2024	Riga, Latvia
86	(Slovakia)	Daniel Brejčák	D	L	39	2024	Poprad, Czechoslovakia
11	(Slovakia)	Radovan Bondra	RW	L	29	2022	Trebišov, Slovakia
37	(Slovakia)	Tomáš Boľo	G	L	23	2024	Žilina, Slovakia
29	(Canada)	Giorgio Estephan	C	R	29	2024	Edmonton, Alberta, Canada
84	(Slovakia)	Viktor Fekiac	C	R	33	2022	Zvolen, Slovakia
97	(Slovakia)	Stanislav Gron	F	L	20	2024	Hamuliakovo, Slovakia
74	(United Kingdom)	Nathanael Halbert	D	L	30	2024	Nottingham, England
70	(Slovakia)	Marek Hecl	RW	L	28	2022	Trenčín, Slovakia
41	(Czech Republic)	Pavel Kantor	G	L	34	2024	České Budějovice, Czechoslovakia
60	(Canada)	Clayton Kirichenko	D	R	30	2024	Sherwood Park, Alberta, Canada
17	(Slovakia)	Andrej Kudrna (C)	RW	L	34	2024	Nové Zámky, Czechoslovakia
43	(Slovakia)	Matej Macek	RW	L	27	2024	Žilina, Slovakia
75	(Slovakia)	Patrik Marcinek	RW	L	27	2017	Zvolen, Slovakia
88	(Slovakia)	Alex Misiak	F	L	18	2024	Malinovo, Slovakia
25	(Canada)	Kyle Olson	RW	R	27	2024	Calgary, Alberta, Canada
2	(Canada)	Carter Robertson	D	L	26	2024	Brandon, Manitoba, Canada
27	(Czech Republic)	David Senčák	C	R	22	2024	Prague, Czech Republic
71	(United States)	Tyler Sheehy	C	R	30	2024	Burnsville, Minnesota, United States
8	(Slovakia)	Jozef Sládok (A)	D	L	37	2021	Zvolen, Czechoslovakia
78	(Slovakia)	David Stránský	D	L	30	2024	Trenčín, Slovakia
30	(Slovakia)	Adam Trenčan	G	L	35	2020	Banská Bystrica, Czechoslovakia
90	(Slovakia)	Marek Viedenský (A)	C	R	35	2020	Handlová, Czechoslovakia
24	(Slovakia)	Peter Zuzin (A)	RW	L	35	2020	Zvolen, Czechoslovakia

== Sponsorship ==
HKM Zvolen has a list of sponsors such as Urpiner, Doprastav, OS Zvolen, COOP Jednote Krupina, ZOS Loko, INMEDIA, KOŠÚT Plus, BDI, Almik, Geis, Vezopax, J&K Invest Group, Betamont, Retech and Instaforex.

== Notable coaches ==
- Ernest Bokroš
- František Hossa
- Július Šupler

== Notable players ==
- Jozef Golonka
- Róbert Pukalovič
- Miroslav Michalek
- Dušan Pohorelec
- Ladislav Čierny
- Jozef Čierny
- Ján Lašák
- Ján Laco
- Vlastimil Plavucha
- Richard Šechný
- Jaroslav Török
- Michal Handzuš
- Vladimír Országh
- Richard Zedník
- Martin Bartek
- Peter Pucher
- Tomáš Tatar
- Martin Trochta
- Marek Ďaloga
- Andrej Podkonický
- Lukáš Jurík
- Kamil Brabenec
- Martin Bartek
- Peter Pucher
- Marek Viedenský
- Juraj Mikúš
- Andrej Kudrna

== Championship winner teams ==
- 2000/2001

Coaches: Ernest Bokroš, Peter Mikula,
Goalies: Rastislav Rovnianek, Peter Ševela,
Defenders: Róbert Pukalovič, Rastislav Štork, Peter Klepáč, Dušan Milo, Roman Čech, Pavel Kowalczyk, Pavel Augusta, Milota Florián, Vladimír Konôpka, Martin Mráz
Forwards: Dušan Pohorelec, Richard Šechný, Andrej Rajčák, Ján Plch, Petr Vlk, Jaroslav Török, Jozef Čierny, Michal Longauer, Peter Konder, Igor Majeský, Rostislav Vlach, Kamil Mahdalík, Ladislav Paciga, Ondřej Kavulič, Gabriel Špilár, Roman Macoszek

- 2012/2013

Coaches: Peter Mikula, Jaroslav Török
Goalies: Marek Šimko, Igor Cibuľa, Lukáš Škrečko
Defenders: Ján Mucha, Michal Pihnarčík, Michal Juraško, Martin Výborný, Jaroslav Hertl, Peter Novajovský, Peter Hraško, Lubor Pokovič, Ladislav Čierny, Ján Ťavoda, Zdenko Tóth
Forwards:Michal Chovan, Jaroslav Kalla, Peter Zuzin, Lukáš Jurík, Kamil Brabenec, Kamil Mahdalík, Milan Jurík, Radovan Puliš, Andrej Podkonický, Tomáš Škvaridlo, Jaroslav Kalla, Marek Čurilla, Ľubor Zuzin, Patrik Huňady, Martin Ďaloga, Matej Síkela, Milan Čanky,

- 2020/2021

Coaches: Peter Oremus, Andrek Kmeč, Andrej Podkonický
Goalies: Robin Rahm, Adam Trenčan
Defenders: Jakub Meliško, Michal Ivan, Oldřich Kotvan, František Gajdoš, Peter Hraško, Ben Betker, Andrej Hatala, T.J. Melancon, Marek Daloga, Branislav Kubka, Tomás Nociar, Jakub Debnár
Forwards: Marco Halama, Marek Viedenský, Peter Zuzin, Juraj Mikúš, Maroš Jedlička, Allan McPherson, Adam Helewka, Radovan Puliš, Patrik Marcinek, Jozef Tibenský, Jakub Čunderlík, Mikko Nuutinen, Ján Chlepčok, Dalibor Ďuriš, Jakub Kolenič, Nikolas Gubančok, Miloš Kelemen, Miloš Kelemen, Radovan Bondra, Marko Brumerčík, Václav Stupka, Adrián Daniš

== See also ==
- List of Slovak ice hockey champions

Preceded by HC Slovan Bratislava	Slovak Extraliga; Champions; 2000–01	Succeeded by HC Slovan Bratislava
Preceded by HC Slovan Bratislava	Slovak Extraliga; Champions; 2012–13	Succeeded by HC Košice
Preceded by No competition (Note: No playoffs due to the COVID-19 pandemic in Slovakia.)	Slovak Extraliga; Champions; 2020–21	Succeeded by HC Slovan Bratislava
