= Peter Zuzin =

Slovak ice hockey player

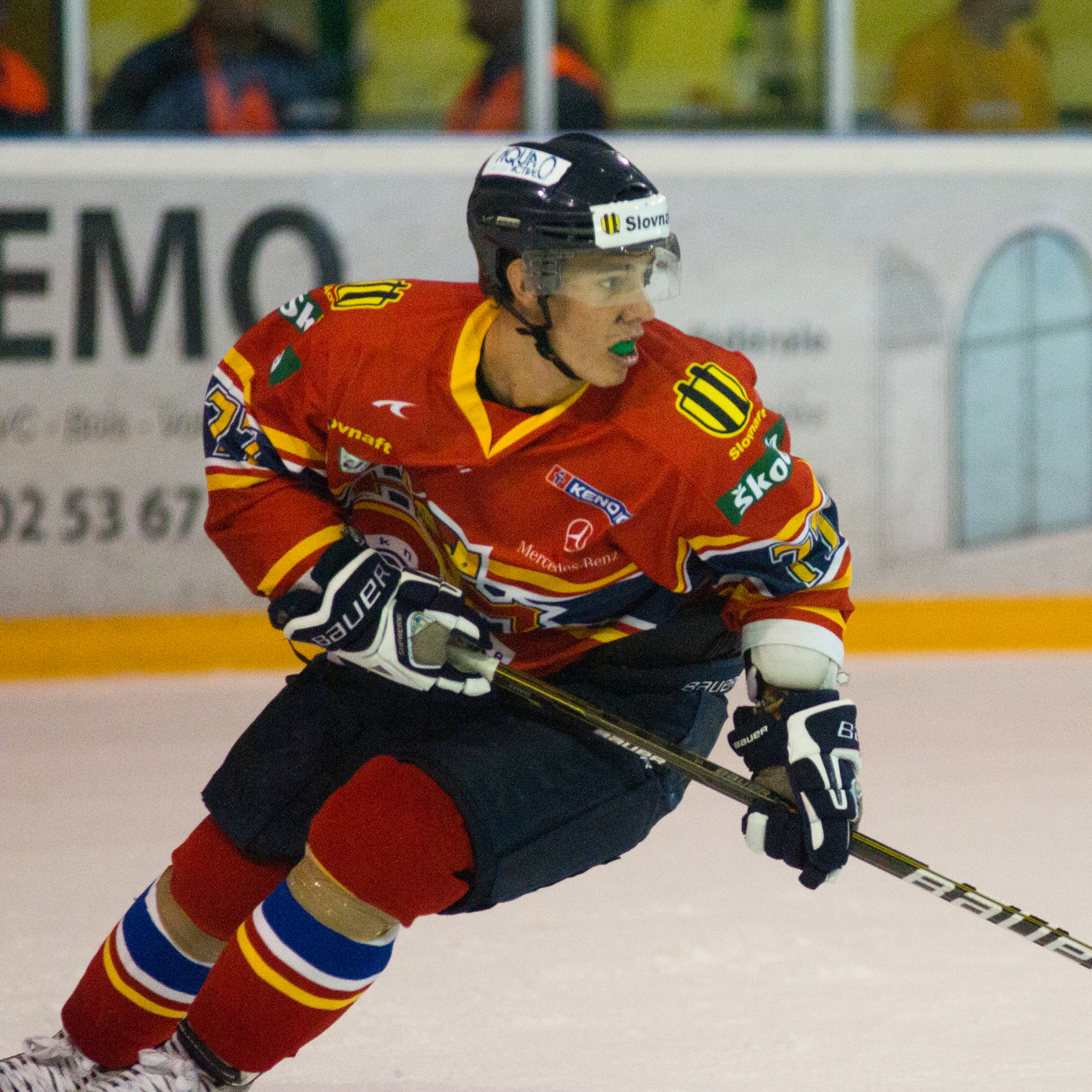
- Zuzin in 2010
- Born: 4 September 1990 (age 35) Zvolen, Czechoslovakia
- Height: 6 ft 0 in (183 cm)
- Weight: 179 lb (81 kg; 12 st 11 lb)
- Position: Forward
- Shoots: Left
- Slovak team Former teams: HKM Zvolen; HC 07 Detva; HC Olomouc; SK Horácká Slavia Třebíč; Sokol Krasnoyarsk
- National team: Slovakia
- NHL draft: Undrafted
- Playing career: 2010–present

Peter Zuzin (born 4 September 1990) is a Slovak professional ice hockey player for HKM Zvolen of the Slovak Extraliga.

== Career ==
Zuzin began his career with his local team HKM Zvolen of the Slovak Extraliga, making his pro debut for the team during the 2010–11 season. In 2014, Zuzin moved to HC Olomouc of the Czech Extraliga.

Medal record

Men's ice hockey

Representing Slovakia

Olympic Games
| Bronze medal – third place | 2022 Beijing | |

== Career statistics ==
=== Regular season and playoffs ===
| | | | Regular season | | | | | Playoffs |
| Season | Team | League | GP | G | A | Pts | PIM | GP | G | A | Pts | PIM |
|---|---|---|---|---|---|---|---|---|---|---|---|---|
| 2006–07 | HKM Zvolen | SVK U18 | 45 | 2 | 5 | 7 | 10 | — | — | — | — | — |
| 2006–07 | HKM Zvolen | SVK U20 | 3 | 0 | 0 | 0 | 0 | — | — | — | — | — |
| 2007–08 | HKM Zvolen | SVK U18 | 60 | 10 | 62 | 72 | 64 | — | — | — | — | — |
| 2007–08 | HKM Zvolen | SVK U20 | 9 | 1 | 2 | 3 | 2 | — | — | — | — | — |
| 2008–09 | HKM Zvolen | SVK U20 | 56 | 13 | 22 | 35 | 26 | — | — | — | — | — |
| 2009–10 | HKM Zvolen | SVK U20 | 48 | 15 | 30 | 45 | 91 | — | — | — | — | — |
| 2010–11 | HKM Zvolen | SVK U20 | 0 | 0 | 0 | 0 | 0 | 2 | 1 | 2 | 3 | 16 |
| 2010–11 | HKM Zvolen | Slovak | 50 | 5 | 6 | 11 | 4 | 6 | 0 | 0 | 0 | 0 |
| 2010–11 | HC 07 Detva | SVK.2 | 1 | 0 | 0 | 0 | 0 | — | — | — | — | — |
| 2011–12 | HKM Zvolen | Slovak | 52 | 8 | 8 | 16 | 14 | 9 | 1 | 2 | 3 | 2 |
| 2012–13 | HKM Zvolen | Slovak | 52 | 17 | 16 | 33 | 12 | 17 | 4 | 6 | 10 | 0 |
| 2013–14 | HKM Zvolen | Slovak | 50 | 10 | 29 | 39 | 29 | 4 | 0 | 1 | 1 | 0 |
| 2014–15 | HC Olomouc | ELH | 40 | 4 | 11 | 15 | 10 | — | — | — | — | — |
| 2014–15 | SK Horácká Slavia Třebíč | CZE.2 | 8 | 2 | 4 | 6 | 2 | — | — | — | — | — |
| 2015–16 | SK Horácká Slavia Třebíč | CZE.2 | 16 | 6 | 4 | 10 | 8 | — | — | — | — | — |
| 2015–16 | HKM Zvolen | Slovak | 31 | 6 | 4 | 10 | 20 | 4 | 1 | 0 | 1 | 0 |
| 2016–17 | HKM Zvolen | Slovak | 55 | 11 | 31 | 42 | 38 | 7 | 3 | 3 | 6 | 4 |
| 2017–18 | Sokol Krasnoyarsk | VHL | 51 | 14 | 7 | 21 | 24 | 9 | 2 | 1 | 3 | 2 |
| 2018–19 | HKM Zvolen | Slovak | 50 | 13 | 22 | 35 | 8 | 12 | 2 | 2 | 4 | 4 |
| 2019–20 | HC 07 WPC Detva | Slovak | 40 | 17 | 15 | 32 | 8 | — | — | — | — | — |
| 2019–20 | HKM Zvolen | Slovak | 10 | 6 | 5 | 11 | 4 | — | — | — | — | — |
| 2020–21 | HKM Zvolen | Slovak | 49 | 7 | 26 | 33 | 20 | 9 | 5 | 4 | 9 | 2 |
| 2021–22 | HKM Zvolen | Slovak | 40 | 14 | 22 | 36 | 14 | 11 | 1 | 6 | 7 | 0 |
| 2022–23 | HKM Zvolen | Slovak | 42 | 6 | 14 | 20 | 18 | 17 | 7 | 8 | 15 | 6 |
| 2023–24 | HKM Zvolen | Slovak | 49 | 20 | 19 | 39 | 10 | 10 | 2 | 5 | 7 | 4 |
| 2024–25 | HKM Zvolen | Slovak | 52 | 13 | 25 | 38 | 16 | 16 | 3 | 6 | 9 | 22 |
| 2025–26 | HKM Zvolen | Slovak | 47 | 15 | 21 | 36 | 36 | 2 | 0 | 0 | 0 | 2 |
| Slovak totals | | | 669 | 168 | 263 | 431 | 251 | 124 | 29 | 43 | 72 | 46 |

=== International ===
| Year | Team | Event | GP | G | A | Pts | PIM |
|---|---|---|---|---|---|---|---|
| 2022 | Slovakia | OG | 7 | 1 | 0 | 1 | 0 |
| Senior totals | | | 7 | 1 | 0 | 1 | 0 |

== Awards and honors ==
| Award | Year |
Slovak
| Champion | 2013, 2021 |
