= Petar Klepac (disambiguation) =

Petar Klepac is a personal name.

Notable people with the name include:

- Petar Klepac, legendary figure
- Peter Klepáč, Slovak hockey player
