= Trochta =

Trochta is a Czech or Slovak surname. Notable people with the surname include:

- Martin Trochta (born 1979), Slovak ice hockey player
- Štěpán Trochta (1905–1974), Czech Roman Catholic cardinal and Bishop of Litoměřice
