= Andrej Kudrna =

Slovak ice hockey player (born 1991)

- Born: May 11, 1991 (age 35) Nové Zámky, Czechoslovakia
- Height: 6 ft 0 in (183 cm)
- Weight: 183 lb (83 kg; 13 st 1 lb)
- Position: Winger
- Shoots: Left
- Slovak team Former teams: HKM Zvolen; HC Slovan Bratislava; HK 36 Skalica; HC ’05 Banská Bystrica; HC Sparta Praha; HC Litvínov
- National team: Slovakia
- NHL draft: Undrafted
- Playing career: 2011–present

Andrej Kudrna (born May 11, 1991) is a Slovak professional ice hockey forward who is currently playing under contract with HKM Zvolen in the Slovak Extraliga (Slovak).

He participated at the 2017 IIHF World Championship and he was also selected and competed in the 2018 Winter Olympics for Slovakia.

== Career statistics ==
=== Regular season and playoffs ===
			Regular season					Playoffs
Season	Team	League	GP	G	A	Pts	PIM	GP	G	A	Pts	PIM
2006–07	HC Slovan Bratislava	SVK U18	55	23	33	56	12	—	—	—	—	—
2007–08	HC Slovan Bratislava	SVK U18	31	16	19	35	18	—	—	—	—	—
2007–08	HC Slovan Bratislava	SVK U20	31	8	14	22	8	2	0	0	0	0
2008–09	Vancouver Giants	WHL	67	18	20	38	32	14	1	0	1	8
2009–10	Vancouver Giants	WHL	5	0	0	0	0	—	—	—	—	—
2009–10	Red Deer Rebels	WHL	64	30	24	54	20	3	0	0	0	0
2010–11	Red Deer Rebels	WHL	65	29	53	82	26	9	2	6	8	0
2011–12	HC Slovan Bratislava	SVK	37	5	6	11	6	7	0	1	1	0
2011–12	HC Slovan Bratislava	SVK U20	—	—	—	—	—	3	1	0	1	2
2012–13	HC Slovan Bratislava	KHL	13	1	0	1	2	—	—	—	—	—
2012–13	HK 36 Skalica	SVK	27	16	10	26	10	3	0	1	1	0
2013–14	HC Slovan Bratislava	KHL	1	0	0	0	0	—	—	—	—	—
2013–14	HK 36 Skalica	SVK	7	2	3	5	2	6	0	0	0	2
2014–15	HC Slovan Bratislava	KHL	21	1	2	3	0	—	—	—	—	—
2014–15	HC ’05 Banská Bystrica	SVK	32	13	16	29	10	18	6	7	13	2
2015–16	HC Sparta Praha	ELH	47	9	5	14	22	15	3	0	3	0
2016–17	HC Sparta Praha	ELH	47	12	8	20	4	3	0	0	0	0
2017–18	HC Sparta Praha	ELH	52	14	13	27	6	3	0	0	0	0
2018–19	HC Sparta Praha	ELH	52	11	14	25	8	4	1	0	1	0
2019–20	HC Sparta Praha	ELH	49	10	19	29	8	—	—	—	—	—
2020–21	HC Sparta Praha	ELH	43	12	9	21	12	11	0	1	1	4
2021–22	HC Litvínov	ELH	51	11	12	23	10	—	—	—	—	—
2022–23	HC Litvínov	ELH	52	21	9	30	4	3	1	0	1	0
2023–24	HC Litvínov	ELH	52	8	13	21	14	13	3	0	3	6
2024–25	HKm Zvolen	SVK	53	19	19	38	10	16	5	6	11	4
2025–26	HKm Zvolen	SVK	53	15	15	30	6	4	1	1	2	0
SVK totals			209	70	69	139	44	54	12	16	28	8
ELH totals			445	108	102	210	88	52	8	1	9	4

=== International ===
Year	Team	Event	Result	GP	G	A	Pts	PIM
2008	Slovakia	U17	10th	5	0	1	1	2
2011	Slovakia	WJC	8th	6	0	1	1	4
2017	Slovakia	WC	14th	7	1	0	1	0
2018	Slovakia	OG	11th	4	1	0	1	0
2018	Slovakia	WC	9th	5	0	0	0	0
2023	Slovakia	WC	9th	4	1	0	1	0
2024	Slovakia	WC	7th	7	0	1	1	0
Junior totals				11	0	2	2	6
Senior totals				27	3	1	4	0
