= Výborný =

Výborný (feminine Výborná) is a Czech surname. Notable people with the surname include:

- Anatoly Vyborny (born 1965), Russian politician
- David Výborný (born 1975), Czech ice hockey player
- Marek Výborný (born 1976), Czech politician
- Martin Výborný (born 1976), Slovak ice hockey player
- Miloslav Výborný (born 1952), Czech politician
- Richard Výborný (born 1971), Czech table tennis player
