= Pavel Augusta =

Czech ice hockey defenceman

- Born: March 16, 1969 (age 57) Jihlava, Czechoslovakia
- Height: 6 ft 2 in (188 cm)
- Weight: 203 lb (92 kg; 14 st 7 lb)
- Position: Defence
- Shot: Right
- Played for: ASD Dukla Jihlava; Motor České Budějovice; HC Vsetín; HC Pardubice; HC Slezan Opava; HC Zlin; HC Plzeň; Moskitos Essen; HKM Zvolen; HK 32 Liptovský Mikuláš; MsHK Žilina; MHK Dubnica; MHC Martin
- Playing career: 1988–2008; 2011–2012

Pavel Augusta (born March 16, 1969) is a Czech former professional ice hockey defenceman.

Augusta played in the Czechoslovak First Ice Hockey League and the Czech Extraliga for ASD Dukla Jihlava, Motor České Budějovice, HC Vsetín, HC Pardubice, HC Slezan Opava, HC Zlin and HC Plzeň.

He also played in the Deutsche Eishockey Liga for Moskitos Essen and the Tipsport Liga for HKM Zvolen, HK 32 Liptovský Mikuláš, MsHK Žilina, MHK Dubnica and MHC Martin.
