= Radovan Puliš =

Slovak ice hockey forward

- Born: 17 September 1991 (age 34) Hliník nad Hronom, TCH
- Height: 6 ft 1 in (185 cm)
- Weight: 209 lb (95 kg; 14 st 13 lb)
- Position: Forward
- Shoots: Left
- Tipos extraliga team Former teams: HC Slovan Bratislava; HKM Zvolen; HC 07 Detva; EHC Winterthur; HK Dukla Michalovce
- Playing career: 2011–present

Radovan Puliš (born 17 September 1991)is a Slovak former professional ice hockey player. He currently serves as the general manager for HK Indians Žiar nad Hronom..

== Junior career ==
He played three seasons in the QMJHL: the majority of time playing for Acadie-Bathurst Titan and a short time playing for Rouyn-Noranda Huskies.

== Professional career ==
Puliš began his professional career with HKm Zvolen of the Tipsport Liga. In the 2014–15 Slovak Extraliga season he was the leading goal scorer with 30 goals. He also won a league title during the 2012–13 season.

On August 4, 2015, Puliš joined HC Slovan Bratislava of the Kontinental Hockey League. He played five games for the team and scoring one goal before returning to Zvolen on loan.

After retiring from playing, Puliš was named the general manager of HK Indians Žiar nad Hronom.

== International career ==
Puliš played for the Slovakian U-17 and U-18 national teams before making his debut for the Slovakia men's national ice hockey team in 2015.

== Career statistics ==
=== Regular season and playoffs ===
Bold indicates led league

			Regular season					Playoffs
Season	Team	League	GP	G	A	Pts	PIM	GP	G	A	Pts	PIM
2006–07	HKM Zvolen	Slovak-Jr.	3	0	0	0	0	—	—	—	—	—
2007–08	HKM Zvolen	Slovak-Jr.	30	9	14	23	38	—	—	—	—	—
2008–09	Acadie-Bathurst Titan	QMJHL	3	0	0	0	0	—	—	—	—	—
2009–10	Acadie-Bathurst Titan	QMJHL	2	0	1	1	2	—	—	—	—	—
2010–11	Acadie-Bathurst Titan	QMJHL	35	3	5	8	20	—	—	—	—	—
2010–11	Rouyn-Noranda Huskies	QMJHL	1	0	0	0	0	—	—	—	—	—
2010–11	HKM Zvolen	Slovak-Jr.	7	4	6	10	33	12	4	6	10	6
2011–12	HKM Zvolen	Slovak	11	0	0	0	2	8	4	1	5	4
2011–12	HC 07 Detva	Slovak.1	9	6	4	10	4	—	—	—	—	—
2012–13	HKM Zvolen	Slovak	47	10	15	25	12	17	1	2	3	4
2013–14	HKM Zvolen	Slovak	32	2	7	9	4	4	0	0	0	0
2014–15	HKM Zvolen	Slovak	53	**30**	26	56	34	7	4	1	5	2
2015–16	HC Slovan Bratislava	KHL	5	1	0	1	0	—	—	—	—	—
2015–16	HKM Zvolen	Slovak	44	22	24	46	61	12	6	3	9	10
2016–17	EHC Winterthur	NLB	8	6	3	9	4	—	—	—	—	—
2016–17	HKM Zvolen	Slovak	40	19	16	35	36	5	0	3	3	2
2017–18	HKM Zvolen	Slovak	12	0	7	7	0	12	3	1	4	0
2018–19	HC 07 Detva	Slovak	51	11	37	48	24	8	4	3	7	2
2019–20	HC Slovan Bratislava	Slovak	46	16	19	35	22	—	—	—	—	—
2020–21	HKM Zvolen	Slovak	31	15	22	37	36	9	2	4	6	12
2021–22	HKM Zvolen	Slovak	39	13	19	32	32	11	2	7	9	4
2022–23	HK Dukla Michalovce	Slovak	20	6	4	10	8	15	3	4	7	2
Slovak totals			426	144	196	340	271	107	29	29	58	42

== Awards and honors ==
Award	Year
Slovak
Champion	2013, 2021
