= Jozef Sládok =

Slovak ice hockey player

- Born: 4 June 1988 (age 36); Zvolen, Czechoslovakia
- Height: 6 ft 5 in (196 cm)
- Weight: 220 lb (100 kg; 15 st 10 lb)
- Position: Defence
- Shoots: Left
- Slovak team Former teams: HKM Zvolen; HC '05 Banská Bystrica; Plymouth Whalers; Corpus Christi IceRays; HKM Lučenec; HC 07 Detva; Romford Raiders; Hull Stingrays; Edinburgh Capitals; Peterborough Phantoms; HCK; HK Dukla Trenčín
- NHL draft: Undrafted
- Playing career: 2004–present

Jozef Sládok (born 4 June 1988) is a Slovak professional ice hockey player who currently plays professionally for HKM Zvolen of the Slovak Extraliga.

== Career statistics ==
=== Regular season and playoffs ===
			Regular season					Playoffs
Season	Team	League	GP	G	A	Pts	PIM	GP	G	A	Pts	PIM
2004–05	HKm Zvolen	Slovak-Jr.	2	0	0	0	0	—	—	—	—	—
2004–05	HKm Zvolen	Slovak	1	0	0	0	0	—	—	—	—	—
2005–06	HKM Zvolen	Slovak-Jr.	30	5	3	8	80	2	0	0	0	6
2005–06	HKM Zvolen	Slovak	1	0	0	0	0	—	—	—	—	—
2005–06	HC '05 Banská Bystrica	Slovak.1	3	0	0	0	2	—	—	—	—	—
2006–07	Plymouth Whalers	OHL	28	0	3	3	100	—	—	—	—	—
2007–08	Plymouth Whalers	OHL	60	0	4	4	223	3	0	1	1	19
2008–09	Corpus Christi IceRays	CHL	29	1	1	2	154	—	—	—	—	—
2008–09	HKM Lučenec	Slovak.1	5	0	1	1	20	—	—	—	—	—
2009–10	HKM Zvolen	Slovak	1	0	0	0	0	—	—	—	—	—
2009–10	HC 07 Detva	Slovak.1	1	0	1	1	2	—	—	—	—	—
2009–10	Romford Raiders	EPIHL	31	4	13	17	149	—	—	—	—	—
2010–11	Hull Stingrays	EIHL	54	1	6	7	181	2	0	1	1	22
2011–12	Edinburgh Capitals	EIHL	47	1	15	16	145	—	—	—	—	—
2012–13	Peterborough Phantoms	EPIHL	36	3	14	17	183	2	1	1	2	8
2013–14	Peterborough Phantoms	EPIHL	13	0	1	1	66	—	—	—	—	—
2013–14	HCK	Mestis	3	0	0	0	31	4	0	0	0	22
2014–15	HC 07 Detva	Slovak.1	39	8	20	28	184	11	2	1	3	45
2015–16	HC 07 Detva	Slovak.1	39	5	12	17	158	5	0	2	2	33
2016–17	HC 07 Detva	Slovak.1	43	6	27	33	74	11	0	4	4	42
2017–18	HC 07 Detva	Slovak	51	1	10	11	210	—	—	—	—	—
2018–19	HC 07 Detva	Slovak	53	4	15	19	136	9	0	0	0	24
2019–20	HK Dukla Trenčín	Slovak	51	4	3	7	170	—	—	—	—	—
2020–21	HK Dukla Trenčín	Slovak	7	0	2	2	10	—	—	—	—	—
2021–22	HKM Zvolen	Slovak
Slovak totals			165	9	30	39	528	9	0	0	0	24

=== International ===
Year	Team	Event	Result	GP	G	A	Pts	PIM
