= Peter Hraško =

Slovak ice hockey player

- Born: November 6, 1991 (age 33); Detva, Czechoslovakia
- Height: 5 ft 9 in (175 cm)
- Weight: 190 lb (86 kg; 13 st 8 lb)
- Position: Defence
- Shoots: Left
- Slovak team Former teams: HKM Zvolen; HC 07 Detva; HK Orange 20; HC Slavia Praha; Arlan Kokshetau
- Playing career: 2009–present

Peter Hraško (born November 6, 1991) is a Slovak professional ice hockey defenceman who is currently playing for HKM Zvolen of the Slovak Extraliga.

== Career statistics ==
=== Regular season and playoffs ===
			Regular season					Playoffs
Season	Team	League	GP	G	A	Pts	PIM	GP	G	A	Pts	PIM

=== International ===
Year	Team	Event	Result	GP	G	A	Pts	PIM
2010	Slovakia	WJC	8th	6	0	4	4	6
2011	Slovakia	WJC	8th	3	0	0	0	25
Junior totals				9	0	4	4	31

== Awards and honors ==
Award	Year
Slovak
Champion	2013, 2021
