= Jozef Tibenský =

Slovak ice hockey player

- Born: March 26, 1994 (age 32) Bratislava, Slovakia
- Height: 5 ft 10 in (178 cm)
- Weight: 194 lb (88 kg; 13 st 12 lb)
- Position: Winger
- Shoots: Left
- team Former teams: Free agent HK Ružinov; HC Slovan Bratislava; ŠHK 37 Piešťany; HK Poprad; HC Nové Zámky; HC 07 Detva; HKM Zvolen; HK Dukla Michalovce
- Playing career: 2015–present

Jozef Tibenský (born March 26, 1994) is a Slovak professional ice hockey winger. He is currently a Free agent.

Tibenský was an academy player with HK Ružinov 99 Bratislava and HC Slovan Bratislava as well as a member of the Team Slovakia U20 squad before joining ŠHK 37 Piešťany on July 30, 2015. He then moved to HK Poprad the following season, but departed after just eight games and signed with HC Nové Zámky.

On October 20, 2017, Tibenský joined HC 07 Detva. On August 7, 2019, he joined HKM Zvolen.

== Career statistics ==
=== Regular season and playoffs ===
			Regular season					Playoffs
Season	Team	League	GP	G	A	Pts	PIM	GP	G	A	Pts	PIM
Slovak totals			249	34	48	82	86	21	6	5	11	18

=== International ===
Year	Team	Event	Result	GP	G	A	Pts	PIM
2014	Slovakia	WJC	8th	5	0	0	0	0
Junior totals				5	0	0	0	0

== Awards and honors ==
Award	Year
Slovak
Champion	2021
