= Lukáš Jurík =

Slovak ice hockey player

- Born: February 20, 1982 (age 43); Zvolen, Czechoslovakia
- Height: 6 ft 1 in (185 cm)
- Weight: 194 lb (88 kg; 13 st 12 lb)
- Position: Centre
- Shoots: Left
- team Former teams: Free agent HKm Zvolen; MsHK Žilina; HK Spišská Nová Ves; HC Nové Zámky
- Playing career: 2000–present

Lukáš Jurík (born February 20, 1982) is a Slovak professional ice hockey player who is currently a free agent.

Jurík spent the majority of his career playing for his hometown team HKm Zvolen in the Slovak Extraliga. He also played in the same league for MsHK Žilina, HK Spišská Nová Ves and HC Nové Zámky.
