= 2004–05 IIHF Continental Cup =

The Continental Cup 2004–05 was the eighth edition of the IIHF Continental Cup. The season started on September 24, 2004, and finished on January 9, 2005.

The tournament was won by HKm Zvolen, who led the final group.

== Preliminary round ==
=== Group A ===
(Miercurea Ciuc, Romania)

Team #1	Score	Team #2
SC Miercurea Ciuc (Romania)	17:2	(Bulgaria) HC Slavia Sofia

=== Group A standings * ===
Rank	Team	Points
1	(Romania) SC Miercurea Ciuc	2
2	(Bulgaria) HC Slavia Sofia	0

*: (Romania) Steaua București was disqualified

=== Group B ===
(Zagreb, Croatia)

Team #1	Score	Team #2
KHL Medveščak Zagreb (Croatia)	21:1	(Serbia and Montenegro) HK Partizan
SC Energija (Lithuania)	8:4	(Spain) CH Jaca
SC Energija (Lithuania)	25:2	(Serbia and Montenegro) HK Partizan
KHL Medveščak Zagreb (Croatia)	3:1	(Spain) CH Jaca
CH Jaca (Spain)	15:1	(Serbia and Montenegro) HK Partizan
KHL Medveščak Zagreb (Croatia)	4:4	(Lithuania) SC Energija

=== Group B standings ===
Rank	Team	Points	DIF
1	(Lithuania) SC Energija	5	+27
2	(Croatia) KHL Medveščak Zagreb	5	+22
3	(Spain) CH Jaca	2	
4	(Serbia and Montenegro) HK Partizan	0	

== First Group Stage ==
=== Group C ===
(Riga, Latvia)

Team #1	Score	Team #2
Yunost Minsk (Belarus)	12:1	(Romania) SC Miercurea Ciuc
HK Riga 2000 (Latvia)	1:3	(Kazakhstan) Kazzinc-Torpedo
Kazzinc-Torpedo (Kazakhstan)	3:2	(Belarus) Yunost Minsk
HK Riga 2000 (Latvia)	14:4	(Romania) SC Miercurea Ciuc
Kazzinc-Torpedo (Kazakhstan)	8:1	(Romania) SC Miercurea Ciuc
HK Riga 2000 (Latvia)	0:2	(Belarus) Yunost Minsk

=== Group C standings ===
Rank	Team	Points
1	(Kazakhstan) Kazzinc-Torpedo	6
2	(Belarus) Yunost Minsk	4
3	(Latvia) HK Riga 2000	2
4	(Romania) SC Miercurea Ciuc	0

=== Group D ===
(Amiens, France)

Team #1	Score	Team #2
Nottingham Panthers (United Kingdom)	2:2	(Italy) HC Milano Vipers
Gothiques d'Amiens (France)	3:0	(Slovenia) HDD Olimpija Ljubljana
Nottingham Panthers (United Kingdom)	1:0	(Slovenia) HDD Olimpija Ljubljana
Gothiques d'Amiens (France)	0:4	(Italy) HC Milano Vipers
HC Milano Vipers (Italy)	9:2	(Slovenia) HDD Olimpija Ljubljana
Gothiques d'Amiens (France)	1:3	(United Kingdom) Nottingham Panthers

=== Group D standings ===
Rank	Team	Points	DIF
1	(Italy) HC Milano Vipers	5	+11
2	(United Kingdom) Nottingham Panthers	5	+3
3	(France) Gothiques d'Amiens	2	
4	(Slovenia) HDD Olimpija Ljubljana	0	

=== Group E ===
(Oświęcim, Poland)

Team #1	Score	Team #2
Sokil Kiev (Ukraine)	9:0	(Lithuania) SC Energija
Dwory Unia Oświęcim (Poland)	2:1	(Denmark) Esbjerg
Dwory Unia Oświęcim (Poland)	5:3	(Lithuania) SC Energija
Sokil Kiev (Ukraine)	2:1	(Denmark) Esbjerg
Esbjerg (Denmark)	5:3	(Lithuania) SC Energija
Dwory Unia Oświęcim (Poland)	2:4	(Ukraine) Sokil Kiev

=== Group E standings ===
Rank	Team	Points
1	(Ukraine) Sokil Kiev	6
2	(Poland) Dwory Unia Oświęcim	4
3	(Denmark) Esbjerg	2
4	(Lithuania) SC Energija	0

(Norway) Storhamar Dragons : bye

== Second Group Stage ==
=== Group F ===
(Hamar, Norway)

Team #1	Score	Team #2
HC Milano Vipers (Italy)	0:0	(Kazakhstan) Kazzinc-Torpedo
Storhamar Dragons (Norway)	2:2	(Ukraine) Sokil Kiev
Kazzinc-Torpedo (Kazakhstan)	4:2	(Ukraine) Sokil Kiev
Storhamar Dragons (Norway)	2:5	(Italy) HC Milano Vipers
HC Milano Vipers (Italy)	5:0	(Ukraine) Sokil Kiev
Storhamar Dragons (Norway)	3:4	(Kazakhstan) Kazzinc-Torpedo

=== Group F standings ===
Rank	Team	Points	DIF
1	(Italy) HC Milano Vipers	5	+8
2	(Kazakhstan) Kazzinc-Torpedo	5	+3
3	(Norway) Storhamar Dragons	1	
4	(Ukraine) Sokil Kiev	1	

(Hungary) Alba Volán Székesfehérvár, (Slovakia) HKm Zvolen, (Russia) Dynamo Moscow : bye

== Final stage ==
=== Final Group ===
(Székesfehérvár, Hungary)

Team #1	Score	Team #2
HKm Zvolen (Slovakia)	6:1	(Italy) HC Milano Vipers
Alba Volán Székesfehérvár (Hungary)	0:8	(Russia) Dynamo Moscow
Dynamo Moscow (Russia)	5:3	(Italy) HC Milano Vipers
Alba Volán Székesfehérvár (Hungary)	1:2	(Slovakia) HKm Zvolen
Alba Volán Székesfehérvár (Hungary)	2:1	(Italy) HC Milano Vipers
HKm Zvolen (Slovakia)	2:1	(Russia) Dynamo Moscow

=== Final Group standings ===
Rank	Team	Points
1	(Slovakia) HKm Zvolen	6
2	(Russia) Dynamo Moscow	4
3	(Hungary) Alba Volán Székesfehérvár	2
4	(Italy) HC Milano Vipers	0
