= Kamil Mahdalík =

Slovak ice hockey player

- Born: August 4, 1977 (age 47)
- Height: 5 ft 11 in (180 cm)
- Weight: 201 lb (91 kg; 14 st 5 lb)
- Position: Forward
- Shot: Left
- Played for: HKM Zvolen; MHC Martin; MHk 32 Liptovský Mikuláš
- NHL draft: Undrafted
- Playing career: 1995–2015

Kamil Mahdalík (born August 4, 1977) is a former Slovak professional ice hockey player who played in the Slovak Extraliga for HKM Zvolen, MHC Martin, and MHk 32 Liptovský Mikuláš.
