= Marek Ďaloga =

Slovak ice hockey player (born 1989)

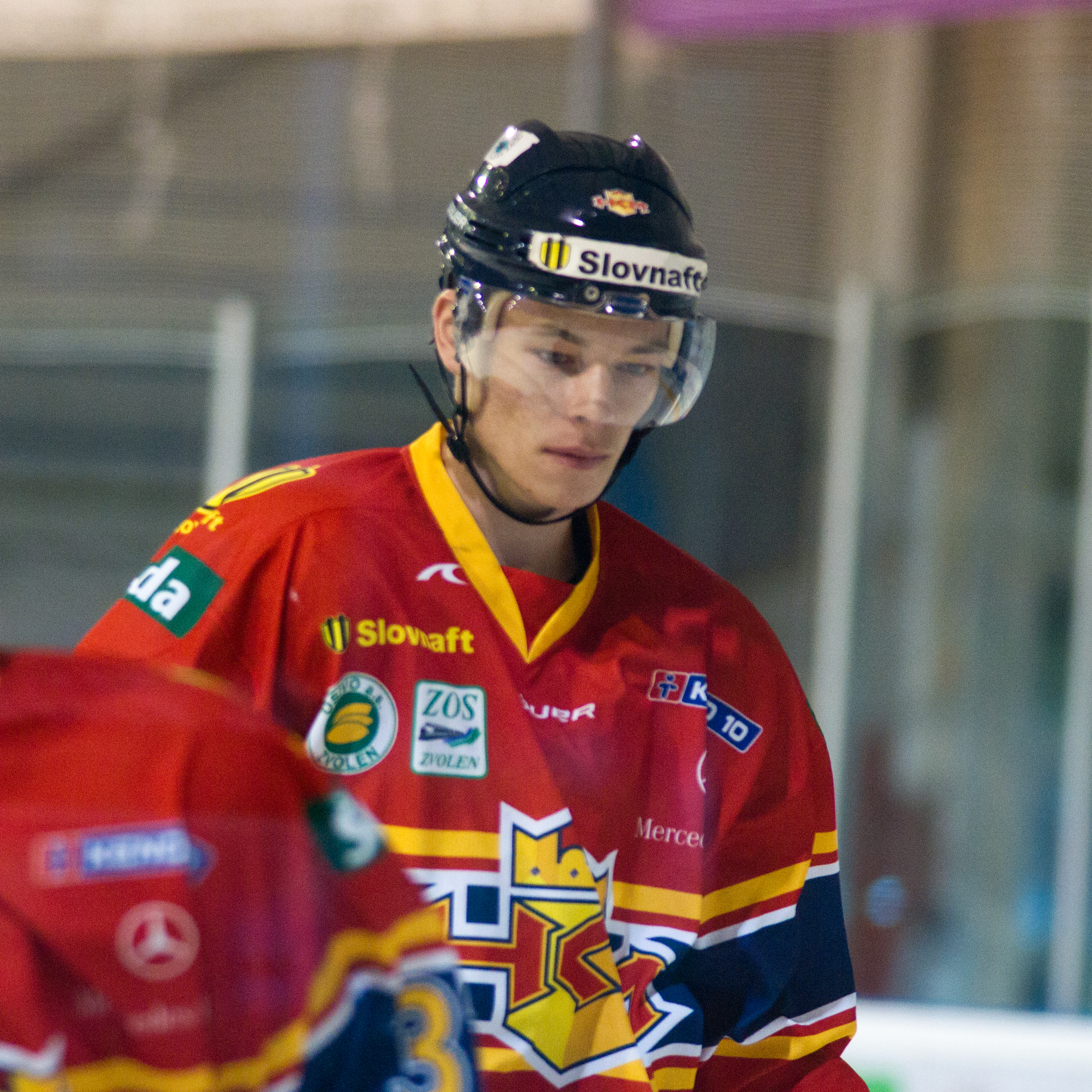
- Ďaloga in 2010
- Born: 10 March 1989 (age 37) Zvolen, Czechoslovakia
- Height: 6 ft 4 in (193 cm)
- Weight: 183 lb (83 kg; 13 st 1 lb)
- Position: Defence
- Shoots: Left
- Czech team Former teams: HC Kometa Brno; HKm Zvolen; HC 07 Detva; HK Orange 20; HK Spisska Nova Ves; HC Pardubice; HC Sparta Praha; Ak Bars Kazan; HC Slovan Bratislava; Kunlun Red Star; Mora IK; Dinamo Riga
- National team: Slovakia
- Playing career: 2006–present

Marek Ďaloga (born 10 March 1989) is a Slovak professional ice hockey defenceman for HC Kometa Brno of the Czech Extraliga (ELH).

== Career statistics ==
=== Regular season and playoffs ===
			Regular season					Playoffs
Season	Team	League	GP	G	A	Pts	PIM	GP	G	A	Pts	PIM
2006–07	HKm Zvolen	SVK	2	0	1	1	0	5	0	0	0	0
2006–07	HC 07 Detva	SVK.2	20	1	4	5	22	—	—	—	—	—
2007–08	HK VSR SR 20	SVK	30	2	2	4	26	—	—	—	—	—
2007–08	HKm Zvolen	SVK	—	—	—	—	—	6	0	0	0	0
2008–09	HKm Zvolen	SVK	14	0	0	0	6	8	0	0	0	0
2008–09	HC 07 Detva	SVK.2	2	1	3	4	4	—	—	—	—	—
2008–09	HK Orange 20	SVK	18	0	2	2	12	—	—	—	—	—
2009–10	HKm Zvolen	SVK	4	0	0	0	2	—	—	—	—	—
2009–10	HK Spišská Nová Ves	SVK	39	3	7	10	26	—	—	—	—	—
2009–10	HC 07 Detva	SVK.2	1	0	1	1	2	—	—	—	—	—
2010–11	HKm Zvolen	SVK	55	4	18	22	57	7	2	1	3	6
2010–11	HC 07 Detva	SVK.2	—	—	—	—	—	1	0	0	0	0
2011–12	HKm Zvolen	SVK	48	4	6	10	14	7	0	2	2	8
2012–13	HC ČSOB Pojišťovna Pardubice	ELH	37	1	3	4	22	5	0	0	0	4
2013–14	HC ČSOB Pojišťovna Pardubice	ELH	43	5	15	20	18	10	1	1	2	2
2014–15	HC Sparta Praha	ELH	48	6	18	24	46	10	0	1	1	6
2015–16	Ak Bars Kazan	KHL	29	1	4	5	14	4	0	1	1	0
2016–17	HC Slovan Bratislava	KHL	45	5	3	8	36	—	—	—	—	—
2017–18	Kunlun Red Star	KHL	34	1	2	3	10	—	—	—	—	—
2017–18	HC Sparta Praha	ELH	15	2	1	3	10	3	0	0	0	25
2018–19	Mora IK	SHL	34	2	5	7	39	—	—	—	—	—
2019–20	HC Sparta Praha	ELH	17	1	7	8	6	—	—	—	—	—
2019–20	Dinamo Rīga	KHL	21	2	1	3	2	—	—	—	—	—
2020–21	HKm Zvolen	SVK	1	0	0	0	2	—	—	—	—	—
2020–21	HC Dynamo Pardubice	ELH	44	7	8	15	18	6	0	4	4	2
2021–22	HC Kometa Brno	ELH	44	5	8	13	16	5	1	3	4	2
2022–23	HC Kometa Brno	ELH	44	1	7	8	26	10	1	2	3	4
2023–24	HC Kometa Brno	ELH	51	3	13	16	6	4	0	0	0	0
2024–25	HC Kometa Brno	ELH	44	9	9	18	20	20	0	4	4	4
2025–26	HC Kometa Brno	ELH	47	1	7	8	14	6	1	0	1	2
SVK totals			211	13	36	49	145	33	2	3	5	14
ELH totals			434	41	96	137	202	79	4	15	19	51
KHL totals			129	9	10	19	62	4	0	1	1	0

Medal record

Representing Slovakia

Ice hockey

Olympic Games
Bronze medal – third place	2022 Beijing	

=== International ===
Year	Team	Event	Result	GP	G	A	Pts	PIM
2006	Slovakia	U17	9th	5	0	1	1	10
2007	Slovakia	WJC18	5th	6	1	1	2	2
2008	Slovakia	WJC	7th	6	0	0	0	2
2009	Slovakia	WJC	4th	7	0	1	1	2
2013	Slovakia	WC	8th	4	0	1	1	0
2014	Slovakia	WC	9th	7	1	3	4	4
2015	Slovakia	WC	9th	7	1	1	2	2
2018	Slovakia	OG	11th	4	0	0	0	2
2018	Slovakia	WC	9th	7	2	1	3	4
2019	Slovakia	WC	9th	2	0	0	0	0
2021	Slovakia	WC	8th	7	1	0	1	2
2021	Slovakia	OGQ	Q	3	0	0	0	2
Junior totals				24	1	3	4	16
Senior totals				41	5	6	11	16
