= Miroslav Michalek =

Slovak ice hockey player

Personal information
- Nationality: Slovak
- Born: 30 June 1965 (age 59); Zvolen, Czechoslovakia

Sport
- Sport: Ice hockey

Miroslav Michalek (born 30 June 1965) is a Slovak ice hockey player. He competed in the men's tournament at the 1994 Winter Olympics. Michalek was president of Slovak hockey club HKM Zvolen from July 2009 until standing down in January 2012.
