= Marek Viedenský =

Slovak ice hockey player

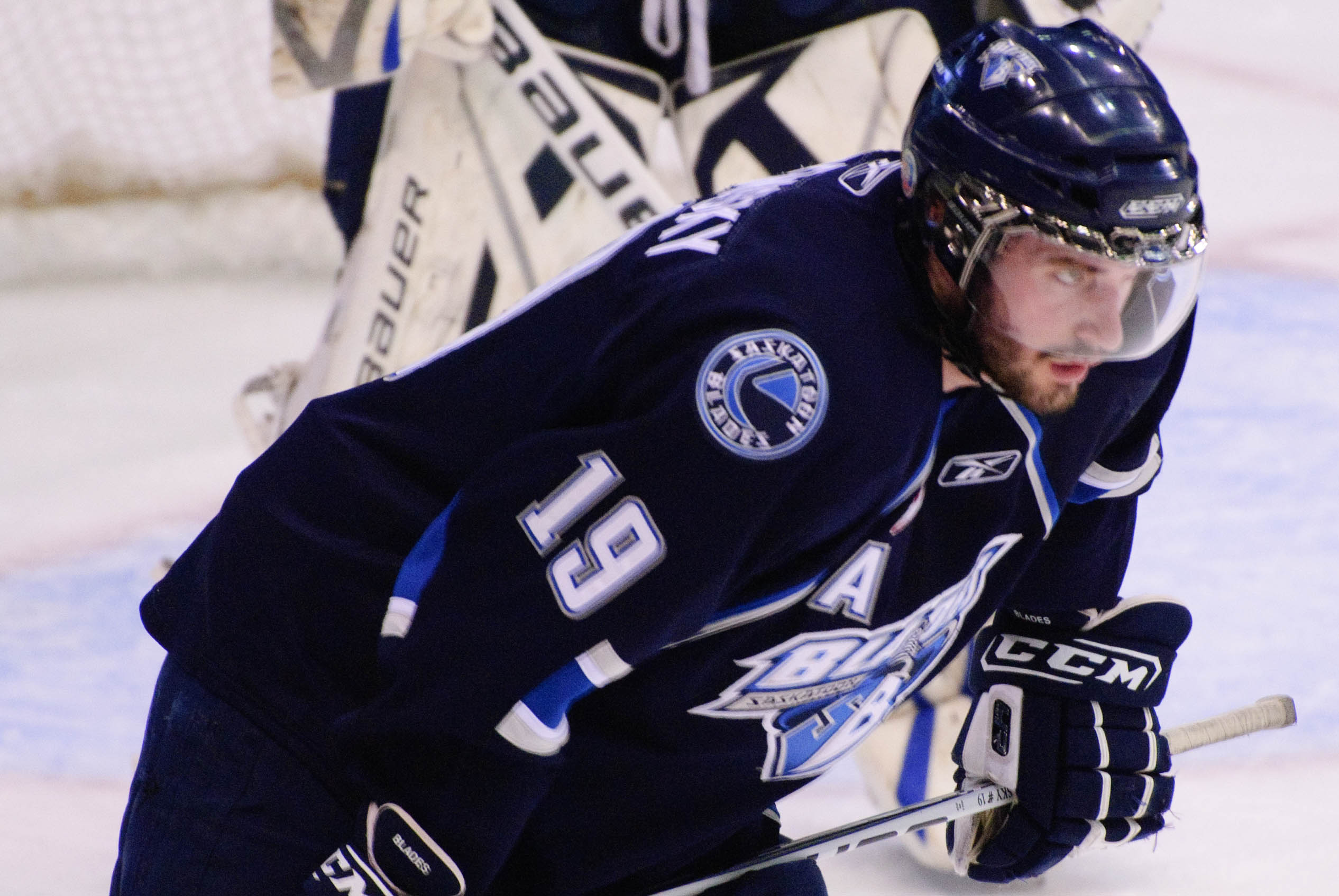
- Born: 18 August 1990 (age 36) Handlová, Czechoslovakia
- Height: 6 ft 4 in (193 cm)
- Weight: 194 lb (88 kg; 13 st 12 lb)
- Position: Centre
- Shoots: Right
- Slovak team Former teams: HKM Zvolen; HK Dukla Trenčín; MHC Prievidza; Prince George Cougars; Saskatoon Blades; Worcester Sharks; San Francisco Bulls; HPK; HC Slovan Bratislava; HC Oceláři Třinec
- National team: Slovakia
- NHL draft: 189th overall, 2009; San Jose Sharks
- Playing career: 2011–present

Marek Viedenský (born 18 August 1990) is a Slovak professional ice hockey forward. He is currently playing for the HKM Zvolen of the Slovak Extraliga.

== Playing career ==
Viedenský was selected by the San Jose Sharks in the 7th round (189th overall) of the 2009 NHL entry draft.

In his professional rookie 2011–12 season Viedenský played 52 games with the Worcester Sharks of the AHL, and during the 2012–13 season Viedenský played with both the Worcester Sharks of the AHL and the San Francisco Bulls of the ECHL.

On 2 August 2013, the San Jose Sharks of the National Hockey League re-signed Viedenský to a one-year contract.

After three year within the San Jose Sharks organization, Viedensky left as a restricted free agent to sign a one-year contract with Finnish Liiga club, HPK on 16 June 2014.

== International play ==
As a member of Team Slovakia, Viedenský competed at the 2009 and 2010 World Junior Ice Hockey Championships.

== Career statistics ==
=== Regular season and playoffs ===
			Regular season					Playoffs
Season	Team	League	GP	G	A	Pts	PIM	GP	G	A	Pts	PIM
2006–07	HK Dukla Trenčín	Slovak-Jr.	37	6	4	10	24	—	—	—	—	—
2007–08	HK Dukla Trenčín	Slovak-Jr.	40	12	16	28	30	—	—	—	—	—
2007–08	MHC Prievidza	Slovak-Jr.1	8	4	14	18	2	—	—	—	—	—
2008–09	Prince George Cougars	WHL	59	16	24	40	34	4	2	0	2	2
2009–10	Prince George Cougars	WHL	31	4	21	25	37	—	—	—	—	—
2009–10	Saskatoon Blades	WHL	30	16	18	34	27	10	7	3	10	0
2010–11	Saskatoon Blades	WHL	63	36	52	88	52	10	1	5	6	4
2011–12	Worcester Sharks	AHL	52	5	6	11	14	—	—	—	—	—
2012–13	Worcester Sharks	AHL	14	4	2	6	4	—	—	—	—	—
2012–13	San Francisco Bulls	ECHL	20	8	12	20	22	—	—	—	—	—
2013–14	Worcester Sharks	AHL	54	6	17	23	29	—	—	—	—	—
2014–15	HPK	Liiga	56	11	21	32	12	—	—	—	—	—
2015–16	HC Slovan Bratislava	KHL	57	10	13	23	26	3	1	0	1	2
2016–17	HC Slovan Bratislava	KHL	20	1	7	8	8	—	—	—	—	—
2017–18	HC Slovan Bratislava	KHL	42	11	10	21	52	—	—	—	—	—
2018–19	HC Oceláři Třinec	Czech	4	0	0	0	0	—	—	—	—	—
2019–20	HC Slovan Bratislava	Slovak	28	7	8	15	8	—	—	—	—	—
2020–21	HKM Zvolen	Slovak	21	4	10	14	14	9	2	7	9	2
AHL totals			120	15	25	40	45	—	—	—	—	—

=== International ===
Year	Team	Event	Result	GP	G	A	Pts	PIM
2008	Slovakia	WJC18	7th	6	1	5	6	6
2009	Slovakia	WJC	4th	7	0	4	4	4
2010	Slovakia	WJC	8th	6	1	5	6	0
2014	Slovakia	WC	9th	7	3	1	4	4
2015	Slovakia	WC	9th	7	1	0	1	6
2016	Slovakia	WC	9th	6	0	4	4	0
Junior totals				19	2	14	16	10
Senior totals				20	4	5	9	10

== Family ==
His brother, Matúš Viedenský (born February 12, 1992), is also a Slovak ice hockey player. Matúš Viedenský made his Slovak Extraliga debut playing with MsHK Zilina during the 2010–11 Slovak Extraliga season.

== Awards and honors ==
Award	Year
Slovak
Champion	2021
