= Martin Výborný =

Czech ice hockey player

- Born: 25 April 1976 (age 49) Mladá Boleslav, Czechoslovakia
- Position: Defenceman
- Slovak Extraliga team: HC Slovan Bratislava
- Playing career: 1996–present

Martin Výborný (25 April 1976) is a Czech former professional ice hockey player. He played with HC Slovan Bratislava in the Slovak Extraliga.

== Personal life ==
His career spanned several clubs and leagues, beginning in his hometown of Mladá Boleslav and moving to various Czech and Slovak teams. Výborný initially gained attention with BK Mladá Boleslav and later became a key player for HC Plzeň, where he developed a reputation for his reliable defensive play and resilience.

After competing in the Czech Extraliga, he extended his career by joining the Slovak Extraliga, playing for teams such as HK Nitra, HK Skalica, and most notably HC Slovan Bratislava, where he contributed to a bronze-medal finish. He later joined HK Zvolen, where he celebrated a championship win in the 2012–2013 season. Following his retirement from professional play, Výborný pursued coaching, focusing on developing young players, and emphasized overall athleticism and skills across multiple sports to enhance performance on the ice
