= Martin Trochta =

Slovak ice hockey player

- Position: Forward
- Slovak Extraliga team: HKm Zvolen
- Playing career: 1998–2016

Martin Trochta is a Slovak professional ice hockey player who is currently playing for HKm Zvolen in the Slovak Extraliga.
