= 2024–25 Slovak Extraliga season =

- League: Slovak Extraliga
- Sport: Ice hockey
- Duration: 20 September 2024 – 7 March 2025 (regular season); 10 March – April 2025 (playoffs)
- Games: 54
- Teams: 12

Regular season
- League Champion: Spišská Nová Ves
- Top scorer: Andrew Calof (Poprad); (69 points)

Playoffs
- Playoffs MVP: Jaroslav Janus

Finals
- Champions: HC Košice
- Runners-up: HK Nitra

Slovak Extraliga seasons
- ← 2023–24 2025–26 →

The 2024–25 Slovak Extraliga season is the 32nd season of the Slovak Extraliga, the highest ice hockey league in Slovakia.

== Team changes ==
HC 19 Humenné finished in the 2023–24 Slovak Extraliga season on the last 12th place and was relegated to a second highest ice hockey league in Slovakia. Meanwhile Vlci Žilina won the promotion from the second league.

== Regular season ==
=== Standings ===
Each team played 54 games: playing each of the other eleven teams four times – 2x at home, 2x away (44 games) and during the Christmas holidays (18.12.2024 – 12.1.2025) each team played the inserted matches within variant "Group West" and "Group East" 1x at home, 1x away = 10 games.

Points were awarded for each game, where three points are awarded for winning in regulation time, two points for winning in overtime or shootout, one point for losing in overtime or shootout, and zero points for losing in regulation time. At the end of the regular season, the team that finished with the most points was crowned the league champion.

Pos	Team	Pld	W	OTW	OTL	L	GF	GA	GD	Pts	Qualification
1	Spišská Nová Ves	54	27	9	5	13	173	152	+21	104	Qualification to Quarter-finals
2	Košice	54	27	6	8	13	172	130	+42	101	Qualification to Quarter-finals
3	Nitra	54	25	8	6	15	197	163	+34	97	Qualification to Quarter-finals
4	Žilina	54	24	10	2	18	174	146	+28	94	Qualification to Quarter-finals
5	Banská Bystrica	54	22	9	4	19	161	145	+16	88	Qualification to Quarter-finals
6	Poprad	54	24	4	6	20	178	144	+34	86	Qualification to Quarter-finals
7	Slovan Bratislava	54	21	5	8	20	164	159	+5	81	Qualification to Wild card round
8	Trenčín	54	23	3	5	23	150	155	−5	80 (Note: Trenčín 7 points, Michalovce 5)	Qualification to Wild card round
9	Michalovce	54	21	6	5	22	157	153	+4	80	Qualification to Wild card round
10	Zvolen	54	17	6	10	21	174	174	0	73	Qualification to Wild card round
11	Liptovský Mikuláš	54	14	5	7	28	140	173	−33	59	
12	Nové Zámky	54	8	0	5	41	114	260	−146	29	Relegated to Slovak 1. Liga

Source: Tipos extraliga
Rules for classification: 1) Points; 2) Head-to-head points.

=== Statistics ===
==== Scoring leaders ====
The following players led the league in regular season points at the completion of games played on 26 February 2025.

Player	Team	GP	G	A	Pts	+/–	PIM
Andrew Calof	HK Poprad	50	20	45	65	+9	12
Adam Cracknell	HK Poprad	51	33	23	56	+7	14
Matthew Boucher	HC '05 Banská Bystrica	48	29	27	56	+8	34
Sean Josling	HK Dukla Trenčín	51	27	27	54	−4	41
Kyle Olson	HKM Zvolen	47	29	20	49	−7	73
Connor Ford	HK Spišská Nová Ves	50	11	37	48	+8	14
Samuel Takáč	HC Slovan Bratislava	48	16	30	46	+20	18
Renārs Krastenbergs	HK Dukla Michalovce	51	29	16	45	−8	32
Samuel Buček	HK Nitra	50	26	19	45	+18	44
Hunter Fejes	Vlci Žilina	46	22	23	45	+13	57

==== Leading goaltenders ====
The following shows the top ten goaltenders who led the league in goals against average, provided that they have played at least 40% of their team's minutes, at the conclusion of games played on 22 December 2024.

Player	Team	GP	TOI	W	L	GA	SO	SV%	GAA
Mareks Mitens	HK Spišská Nová Ves	27	1,573:17	18	9	63	1	91.75	2.40
Ádám Vay	HK Poprad	24	1,366:13	12	12	58	4	91.70	2.55
Dominik Hrachovina	HC MONACObet Banská Bystrica	22	1,337:22	13	9	59	0	91.97	2.65
Filip Surák	HK 32 Liptovský Mikuláš	15	864:07	5	10	39	2	91.41	2.71
Jaroslav Janus	HC Košice	18	1,026:37	12	6	47	1	90.93	2.75
Sami Aittokallio	HK Nitra	19	1,091:26	12	7	51	1	91.84	2.80
Connor LaCouvee	Vlci Žilina	22	1,249:51	12	10	59	0	90.12	2.83
Julian Junca	HK Dukla Ingema Michalovce	19	1,106:56	10	9	54	1	90.83	2.93
Michal Valent	HK Dukla Trenčín	17	920:39	9	8	46	2	91.10	3.00
Evan Fitzpatrick	HK 32 Liptovský Mikuláš	16	819:30	5	11	41	2	90.33	3.00

== Playoffs ==
Ten teams qualify for the playoffs: the top six teams in the regular season have a bye to the quarterfinals, while teams ranked seventh to tenth meet each other (7 versus 10, 8 versus 9) in a preliminary playoff round.

=== Bracket ===
Wild-card round (best-of-5)
7	Slovan Bratislava	1
10	Zvolen	3
8	Trenčín	3
9	Michalovce	2

Quarter-finals (best-of-7)
2	Košice	4
8	Trenčín	2
1	Spišská Nová Ves	2
10	Zvolen	4
3	Nitra	4
6	Poprad	2
4	Žilina	4
5	Banská Bystrica	1

Semi-finals (best-of-7)
2	Košice	4
10	Zvolen	2
(Pairings are re-seeded after the first and second round)
3	Nitra	4
4	Žilina	3

Finals (best-of-7)
2	Košice	4
3	Nitra	3

=== Wild card round ===
Slovan Bratislava – Zvolen 1–3
10.3.2025	Slovan Bratislava	Zvolen	2-4
11.3.2025	Slovan Bratislava	Zvolen	5-1
13.3.2025	Zvolen	Slovan Bratislava	5-2
14.3.2025	Zvolen	Slovan Bratislava	3-2
Zvolen won the series 3–1.

Trenčín – Michalovce 3–2
10.3.2025	Trenčín	Michalovce	3-1
11.3.2025	Trenčín	Michalovce	1-4
13.3.2025	Michalovce	Trenčín	2-3
14.3.2025	Michalovce	Trenčín	5-0
16.3.2025	Trenčín	Michalovce	4-2
Trenčín won the series 3–2.

=== Quarterfinals ===
Spišská Nová Ves – Zvolen 2–4
19.3.2025	Spišská Nová Ves	Zvolen	2-1 OT
20.3.2025	Spišská Nová Ves	Zvolen	0-3
23.3.2025	Zvolen	Spišská Nová Ves	5-1
24.3.2025	Zvolen	Spišská Nová Ves	4-2
25.3.2025	Spišská Nová Ves	Zvolen	3-2
27.3.2025	Zvolen	Spišská Nová Ves	3-0
Zvolen won the series 4–2.

Nitra – Poprad 4–2
17.3.2025	Nitra	Poprad	6-3
18.3.2025	Nitra	Poprad	4-3 OT
21.3.2025	Poprad	Nitra	6-5 OT
22.3.2025	Poprad	Nitra	3-4 OT
25.3.2025	Nitra	Poprad	1-2
27.3.2025	Poprad	Nitra	2-4
Nitra won the series 4–2.

Košice – Trenčín 4–2
19.3.2025	Košice	Trenčín	3-4 OT
20.3.2025	Košice	Trenčín	2-1 OT
23.3.2025	Trenčín	Košice	5-2
24.3.2025	Trenčín	Košice	3-6
26.3.2025	Košice	Trenčín	2-1
28.3.2025	Trenčín	Košice	2-7
Košice won the series 4–2.

Žilina – Banská Bystrica 4–1
17.3.2025	Žilina	Banská Bystrica	3-1
18.3.2025	Žilina	Banská Bystrica	0-8
21.3.2025	Banská Bystrica	Žilina	2-5
22.3.2025	Banská Bystrica	Žilina	3-4 OT
25.3.2025	Žilina	Banská Bystrica	7-1
Žilina won the series 4–1.

=== Semifinals ===
Košice – Zvolen 4–2
2.4.2025	Košice	Zvolen	3-1
3.4.2025	Košice	Zvolen	3-2
6.4.2025	Zvolen	Košice	1-4
7.4.2025	Zvolen	Košice	5-2
10.4.2025	Košice	Zvolen	0-3
12.4.2025	Zvolen	Košice	0-5
Košice won the series 4–2.

Nitra – Žilina 4–3
4.4.2025	Nitra	Žilina	2-1
5.4.2025	Nitra	Žilina	2-4
8.4.2025	Žilina	Nitra	1-2 OT
9.4.2025	Žilina	Nitra	2-6
11.4.2025	Nitra	Žilina	2-3
13.4.2025	Žilina	Nitra	3-2 OT
15.4.2025	Nitra	Žilina	7-4
Nitra won the series 4–3.

== Final rankings ==
Gold medal	Košice
Silver medal	Nitra
Bronze medal	Žilina
4	Zvolen
5	Spišská Nová Ves
6	Banská Bystrica
7	Poprad
8	Trenčín
9	Slovan Bratislava
10	Michalovce
11	Liptovský Mikuláš
12	Nové Zámky
