= Dušan Pohorelec =

Slovak ice hockey player

Personal information
- Nationality: Slovak
- Born: 20 November 1972 (age 52); Detva, Czechoslovakia

Sport
- Sport: Ice hockey

Dušan Pohorelec (born 20 November 1972) is a Slovak ice hockey player. He competed in the men's tournament at the 1994 Winter Olympics. He also played 54 games for the Slovakia national team, scoring 14 goals.
