= 1996–97 Slovak 1. Liga season =

Slovak ice hockey league season

The 1996–97 Slovak 1.Liga season was the fourth season of the Slovak 1. Liga, the second level of ice hockey in Slovakia. 12 teams participated in the league, and HKm Zvolen won the championship.

== Regular season ==
	Club	GP	W	T	L	Goals	Pts
1.	HKm Zvolen	34	24	4	6	140:79	52
2.	HK 36 Skalica	34	23	3	8	163:93	49
3.	Dragon Prešov	34	22	4	8	148:79	48
4.	HC VTJ Michalovce	34	21	3	10	120:82	45
5.	HC VTJ Topoľčany	34	18	6	10	129:101	42
6.	HC Polygón Nitra	34	13	6	15	112:117	32
7.	ŠHK Danubia 96 Bratislava	34	11	7	16	113:115	29
8.	HK ŠKP Žilina	34	12	5	17	110:124	29
9.	HC Dukla Senica	34	11	5	18	94:113	27
10.	ŠK Matador Púchov	34	9	7	18	93:132	25
11.	HK 31 Kežmarok	34	9	5	20	79:146	23
12.	HK VTJ Piešťany	34	3	1	30	71:191	7

== Qualification round ==
	Club	GP	W	T	L	Goals	Pts
5.	HC VTJ Topoľčany	48	23	10	15	184:151	56
6.	HC Dukla Senica	48	20	7	21	156:156	47
7.	ŠK Matador Púchov	48	18	10	20	145:169	46
8.	ŠHK Danubia 96 Bratislava	48	17	10	21	160:156	44
9.	HK ŠKP Žilina	48	18	5	25	157:184	41
10.	HC Polygón Nitra	48	16	9	23	159:179	41
11.	HK 31 Kežmarok	48	13	7	28	125:192	33
12.	HK VTJ Piešťany	48	8	2	38	119:251	18
