= 2001–02 Slovak Extraliga season =

Slovak ice hockey league season

The 2001–02 Slovak Extraliga season was the ninth season of the Slovak Extraliga, the top level of ice hockey in Slovakia. 10 teams participated in the league, and HC Slovan Bratislava won the championship.

== Standings ==
	Team	GP	Pts	W	OTW	T	L	OTL	GF:GA	Diff.
1.	HKm Zvolen	54	76	30	3	6	4	11	201:121	+80
2.	HC Slovan Bratislava	54	72	27	4	8	2	13	160:113	+47
3.	HC Košice	54	71	25	5	6	5	13	183:133	+50
4.	ŠKP PS Poprad	54	65	21	6	8	3	16	139:142	-3
5.	Dukla Trenčín	54	61	22	5	6	1	20	169:146	+23
6.	HK 36 Skalica	54	57	20	4	7	2	21	153:136	+17
7.	MHk 32 Liptovský Mikuláš	54	49	17	3	6	3	25	144:168	-24
8.	HK ŠKP Žilina	54	48	16	3	4	6	25	119:158	-39
9.	HK Martimex Martin	54	41	12	3	7	4	28	130:193	-63
10.	MHC Nitra	54	36	12	0	6	6	30	107:195	-88

== Playoffs ==
=== Quarterfinals ===
- HKm Zvolen - MsHK Žilina 4:0 (3 : 0, 6 : 2, 3:0, 5:2)
- HC Slovan Bratislava - MHk 32 Liptovský Mikuláš 4:3 (4 : 2, 3 : 4 OT, 2:1, 2:3 OT, 5 : 2, 1:4, 7 : 1)
- HC Košice – HK 36 Skalica 4:1 (5 : 2, 6 : 0, 1:5, 3:1, 4 : 1)
- ŠKP PS Poprad - Dukla Trenčín 4:1 (2 : 3 OT, 6 : 0, 3:1, 3:2 OT, 3 : 2)

=== Semifinals ===
- HKm Zvolen - HK ŠKP Poprad 4:0 (5 : 2, 6 : 1, 3:1, 4:1)
- HC Slovan Bratislava - HC Košice 4:2 (2 : 1, 4 : 2, 2:4, 1:2, 4 : 3 OT, 5:1)

=== Final ===
- HKm Zvolen - HC Slovan Bratislava 2:4 (3 : 4, 3 : 6, 3:1, 2:3 OT 8 : 1, 1:4)

=== Relegation ===
- MHC Nitra - HK Spišská Nová Ves 2:4 (1:3, 4:1, 5:6 SO, 1:5, 3:2, 1:7)
