= 2000–01 Slovak Extraliga season =

Slovak ice hockey league season

The 2000–01 Slovak Extraliga season was the eighth season of the Slovak Extraliga, the top level of ice hockey in Slovakia. Eight teams participated in the league, and HKM Zvolen won the championship.

== Standings ==
	Team	GP	Pts	W	OTW	T	OTL	L	GF:GA	Diff.
1	HKm Zvolen	56	125	37	4	3	3	9	242:139	+103
2	HC Slovan Bratislava	56	110	31	3	7	4	11	223:117	+106
3	Dukla Trenčín	56	95	26	5	3	4	18	188:169	+19
4	HK ŠKP Poprad	56	94	26	6	1	3	20	172:174	-2
5	HC Košice	56	68	18	4	2	4	28	140:186	-46
6	HK 36 Skalica	56	67	19	2	1	5	29	138:191	-53
7	HK 32 Liptovský Mikuláš	56	52	14	2	3	3	34	129:197	-68
8	MHC Martin	56	50	13	3	2	3	35	121:180	-59

== Playoffs ==
=== Quarterfinals ===
- HKM Zvolen - MHC Martin 3:0 (9:2, 6:3, 2:1)
- HC Slovan Bratislava - HK 32 Liptovský Mikuláš 3:0 (5:4 OT, 9:1, 7:3)
- HK ŠKP Poprad - HC Košice 3:0 (3:2, 4:3, 2:1)
- Dukla Trenčín – HK 36 Skalica 3:2 (2:4, 3:0, 4:2, 0:5, 3:1)

=== Semifinals ===
- HKM Zvolen - HK ŠKP Poprad 3:0 (6:2, 4:2, 3:0)
- HC Slovan Bratislava - Dukla Trenčín 2:3 (6:1, 3:4, 2:3 OT, 5:2, 2:3 OT)

=== Final ===
- HKM Zvolen - Dukla Trenčín 3:1 (6:0, 3:1, 1:2, 6:3)
