= 1999–2000 Slovak Extraliga season =

Slovak ice hockey league season

The 1999–2000 Slovak Extraliga season was the seventh season of the Slovak Extraliga, the top level of ice hockey in Slovakia. Eight teams participated in the league, and HC Slovan Bratislava won the championship.

== Standings ==
	Team	GP	Pts	W	T	L	GF:GA	Diff.
1	HC Slovan Bratislava	56	75	34	7	15	233:133	+100
2	HKm Zvolen	56	71	31	9	16	219:161	+58
3	HK ŠKP Poprad	56	66	29	8	19	182:162	+20
4	Dukla Trenčín	56	63	27	9	20	207:151	+56
5	HK 36 Skalica	56	57	23	11	22	159-175	-16
6	HK 32 Liptovský Mikuláš	56	56	20	16	20	157-184	-27
7	HC VSŽ Košice	56	35	12	11	33	142-235	-93
8	HK Spišská Nová Ves	56	25	9	7	40	114-212	-98

== Playoffs ==
=== Semifinals ===
- HC Slovan Bratislava - Dukla Trenčín 3:0 (10:2, 2:0, 2:1)
- HKm Zvolen - HK ŠKP Poprad 3:2 (0:2, 5:2, 4:1, 0:5, 3:0)

=== Final ===
- HC Slovan Bratislava - HKm Zvolen 3:2 (0:1, 5:1, 2:3, 3:1, 8:1)

=== Third place ===
- Dukla Trenčín - HK ŠKP Poprad 2:0 (6:4, 3:1)
