= 1998–99 Slovak Extraliga season =

- League: Slovak Extraliga
- Sport: Ice hockey
- Teams: 12

Regular season
- League Champion: HC Slovan Harvard Bratislava

Playoffs
- Finals champions: HC VSŽ Košice
- Runners-up: HC Slovan Harvard Bratislava

Slovak Extraliga seasons
- 1997–98 1999–2000

The 1998–99 Slovak Extraliga season was the sixth season of the Slovak Extraliga, the top level of ice hockey in Slovakia. 12 teams participated in the league, and HC VSŽ Košice won the championship.

== Standings ==
=== First round ===
	Team	GP	Pts	W	T	L	GF–GA	Diff.
1	HC Slovan Harvard Bratislava	22	39	18	3	1	130:43	+87
2	HC VSŽ Košice	22	29	12	5	5	77:66	+11
3	HK 36 Skalica	22	27	13	1	8	73:51	+22
4	HKm Zvolen	22	24	8	8	6	70:62	+8
5	Dukla Trenčín	22	24	10	4	8	63:47	+16
6	HK 32 VA Liptovský Mikuláš	22	24	9	6	7	70:67	+3
7	HK ŠKP Poprad	22	21	8	5	9	74:63	+11
8	HK VTJ Spišská Nová Ves	22	19	8	3	11	62:77	-15
9	ŠK Iskra Banská Bystrica	22	18	7	4	11	55:75	-20
10	HC Martimex ZŤS Martin	22	18	7	4	11	58:77	-19
11	HK VTJ Farmakol Prešov	22	12	3	6	13	41:103	-62
12	MHC Nitra	22	9	3	3	16	52:97	-45

=== Final round ===
	Team	GP	Pts	W	T	L	GF:GA	Diff.
1	HC Slovan Harvard Bratislava	42	69	32	5	5	245:102	+143
2	HK 36 Skalica	42	46	20	6	16	135:118	+17
3	Dukla Trenčín	42	46	20	6	16	125:114	+11
4	HK 32 VA Liptovský Mikuláš	42	46	20	6	16	140:134	+6
5	HC VSŽ Košice	42	44	18	8	16	146:136	+10
6	HKm Zvolen	42	36	12	12	18	117:144	-27

=== Relegation ===
	Team	GP	Pts	W	T	L	GF:GA	Diff.
1	HC ŠKP Poprad	28	41	18	5	5	132:71	+61
2	HK VTJ Spišská Nová Ves	28	41	17	7	4	110:71	+39
3	ŠK Iskra Banská Bystrica	28	39	17	5	6	95:62	+33
4	HC Martimex ZŤS Martin	28	32	11	10	7	85:78	+7
5	MHC Nitra	28	25	8	9	11	91:95	-4
6	HK ŠKP Žilina	28	20	8	4	16	66:99	-33
7	HK VTJ Farmakol Prešov	28	15	5	5	18	79:121	-42
8	HK Spartak Dubnica nad Váhom	28	11	3	5	20	63:124	-61

== Playoffs ==
=== Quarterfinals ===
- HC Slovan Harvard Bratislava - HK VTJ Spišská Nová Ves 3:0 (12:0, 3:1, 9:3)
- HK 36 Skalica - HC ŠKP Poprad 3:0 (6:2, 4:2, 4:3 OT)
- Dukla Trenčín - HKm Zvolen 0:3 (2:3 SO, 3:4 SO, 2:3 SO)
- HK 32 VA Liptovský Mikuláš - HC VSŽ Košice 1:3 (5:2, 1:5, 2:3 OT, 2:6)

=== Semifinals ===
- HC Slovan Harvard Bratislava - HKm Zvolen 3:0 (6:5 OT, 7:1, 5:2)
- HK 36 Skalica - HC VSŽ Košice 0:3 (3:5, 1:7, 3:5)

=== Final ===
- HC Slovan Harvard Bratislava - HC VSŽ Košice 1:3 (4:1, 5:6, 2:3, 0:3)
