= 2003–04 Slovak Extraliga season =

Slovak ice hockey league season

The Slovak Extraliga 2003–04 was the eleventh regular season of the Slovak Extraliga, the top level of professional ice hockey in Slovakia.

== Regular season ==
=== Final standings ===
Po.	Club	GP	W	OTW	T	OTL	L	GF	GA	PTS
1.	HC Dukla Trenčín	54	38	1	5	1	9	172	87	121
2.	HKm Zvolen	54	30	4	7	1	12	189	123	105
3.	HC Slovan Bratislava	54	29	2	9	1	13	178	116	100
4.	HC Košice	54	24	0	8	3	19	149	124	80
5.	ŠKP Žilina	54	18	0	14	1	21	117	124	68
6.	HK 36 Skalica	54	18	2	9	1	24	138	143	67
7.	MHk 32 Liptovský Mikuláš	54	18	1	10	1	24	119	136	66
8.	HK Poprad	54	15	1	7	0	31	110	173	54
9.	MHK Nitra	54	15	1	5	1	32	117	197	52
10.	MHC Martin	54	11	1	8	3	31	119	185	43

Progressed to the Play off
Relegated to the First League

Key - GP: Games played, W: Wins, OTW: Over time wins, T: Ties, OTL: Over time losses, L: Losses, GF: Goals for, GA: Goals against, PTS: Points.

== Playoffs ==
=== Playoff tree ===
Quarterfinals
1.	Dukla Trenčín	4
8.	HK Poprad	0
4.	HC Košice	4
5.	ŠKP Žilina	0
2.	HKm Zvolen	4
7.	MHk 32 Lipt. Mikuláš	0
3.	HC Slovan	4
6.	HK 36 Skalica	1

Semifinals
1.	Dukla Trenčín	4
4.	HC Košice	0
2.	HKm Zvolen	4
3.	HC Slovan	3

Final
1.	Dukla Trenčín	4
2.	HKm Zvolen	2

== Scoring Leaders ==
Regular season

#	Player	Club	GP	G	A	PTS
1.	(Slovakia) Martin Bartek	Zvolen		38	36	74
2.	(Slovakia) Zdeno Cíger	Slovan		22	38	60
3.	(Slovakia) Richard Hartmann	Skalica		16	35	51
4.	(Slovakia) René Jarolín	Skalica		28	20	48
4.	(Slovakia) Richard Šechný	Zvolen		13	35	48

Key - GP: Games played, G: Goals, A: Assists, PTS: Points.

Play-off

#	Player	Club	GP	G	A	PTS
1.	(Slovakia) Martin Bartek	Zvolen		8	16	24
2.	(Slovakia) Peter Fabus	Trenčín		8	6	14
2.	(Slovakia) Martin Hujsa	Slovan		5	9	14
4.	(Slovakia) Martin Opatovský	Trenčín		6	7	13
5.	(Slovakia) Roman Kukumberg	Trenčín		4	8	12

== 2003–04 All Star Team ==
Player	Post	Club
(Slovakia) Karol Križan	G	Zvolen
(Slovakia) Andrej Meszároš	D	Trenčín
(Czech Republic) Petr Pavlas	D	Slovan
(Slovakia) Martin Bartek	LW	Zvolen
(Slovakia) Roman Kukumberg	C	Trenčín
(Slovakia) Peter Fabus	RW	Trenčín

Coach	Club
(Slovakia) Dušan Gregor	Trenčín
