= 1997–98 Slovak Extraliga season =

- League: Slovak Extraliga
- Sport: Ice hockey
- Games: 36
- Teams: 10

Regular season
- League Champion: HC Slovan Bratislava
- Runners-up: HC Košice

Playoffs
- Finals champions: HC Slovan Bratislava
- Runners-up: HC Košice

Slovak Extraliga seasons
- 1996–97 1998–99

The 1997–98 Slovak Extraliga season was the fifth season of the Slovak Extraliga, the top level of ice hockey in Slovakia. 10 teams participated in the league, and HC Slovan Bratislava won the championship.

== Standings ==
	Team	GP	Pts	W	T	L	GF:GA	Diff.
1	HC Slovan Bratislava	36	58	28	2	6	170-72	+98
2	HC Košice	36	56	27	2	7	174-87	+87
3	HC ŠKP Poprad	36	43	18	7	11	122-106	+16
4	Dukla Trenčín	36	42	19	4	13	177-103	+74
5	HKm Zvolen	36	32	15	2	19	92-112	-20
6	HK 36 Skalica	36	31	13	5	18	100-124	-24
7	Martimex ZŤS Martin	36	30	12	6	18	112-120	-8
8	HK VTJ Spišská Nová Ves	36	26	10	6	20	93-121	-28
9	MHC Nitra	36	24	8	8	20	81-144	-63
10	HK 32 Liptovský Mikuláš	36	18	7	4	25	87-159	-72

== Playoffs ==
=== Quarterfinals ===
- HC Slovan Bratislava - HK VTJ Spišská Nová Ves 3:0 (8:1,8:2,6:4)
- HC Košice - Martimex ZŤS Martin 3:0 (4:2,5:1,2:0)
- ŠKP PS Poprad - HK 36 Skalica 3:0 (7:1,7:4,5:4)
- Dukla Trenčín - HKm Zvolen 3:2 (4:2,7:4,2:3 OT,1:4,4:3)

=== Semifinals ===
- HC Slovan Bratislava - Dukla Trenčín 3:0 (5:1,4:0,6:3)
- HC Košice - HC ŠKP Poprad 3:0 (6:2,3:2,3:1)

=== 3rd place ===
- HC ŠKP Poprad - Dukla Trenčín 2:0 (6:3,3:2)

=== Final ===
- HC Slovan Bratislava - HC Košice 3:2 (3:2 OT,5:4 OT,1:2,1:4,3:2 OT)

=== Relegation ===
- HK 32 Liptovský Mikuláš - HK Spartak Dubnica nad Váhom 3:2 (2:3 OT,1:2,5:1,2:1,3:2 OT)
