= Slavomír Pavličko =

Slovak ice hockey player

- Born: June 11, 1972 (age 53) Poprad, Czechoslovakia
- Height: 5 ft 10 in (178 cm)
- Weight: 176 lb (80 kg; 12 st 8 lb)
- Position: Left wing
- Shot: Left
- Played for: HK Poprad; AC ZPS Zlín; HC Slovan Bratislava; HK Nitra; MHK Kežmarok; HK Partizan
- Playing career: 1991–2011

Slavomír Pavličko (born 11 June 1972) is a Slovak former professional ice hockey winger. He played with clubs including HC Slovan Bratislava in the Slovak Extraliga.

== Career statistics ==
			Regular season					Playoffs
Season	Team	League	GP	G	A	Pts	PIM	GP	G	A	Pts	PIM
1991–92	TJ ŠKP PS Poprad	Czechoslovakia	38	10	4	14	—	5	0	0	0	—
1992–93	TJ ŠKP PS Poprad	Czechoslovakia	34	2	2	4	—	—	—	—	—	—
1993–94	PSG Berani Zlín	Czech	—	—	—	—	—	2	0	0	0	0
1993–94	HC SKP PS Poprad	Slovak	34	11	12	23	—	—	—	—	—	—
1994–95	HC SKP PS Poprad	Slovak	36	14	16	30	12	9	4	5	9	2
1995–96	HC SKP PS Poprad	Slovak	39	15	20	35	22	—	—	—	—	—
1996–97	HC SKP PS Poprad	Slovak	51	15	34	49	26	—	—	—	—	—
1996–97	SK Matador Puchov	Slovak2	4	2	1	3	4	—	—	—	—	—
1997–98	HC SKP Poprad	Slovak	44	8	29	37	12	—	—	—	—	—
1998–99	HC SKP Poprad	Slovak	49	9	30	39	22	3	2	0	2	—
1999–00	HC SKP Poprad	Slovak	55	12	36	48	18	—	—	—	—	—
2000–01	HC SKP Poprad	Slovak	56	20	41	61	32	6	1	3	4	2
2001–02	HC Slovan Bratislava	Slovak	53	14	24	38	18	—	—	—	—	—
2002–03	HC Slovan Bratislava	Slovak	53	10	18	28	34	13	7	8	15	6
2003–04	HC Slovan Bratislava	Slovak	49	8	22	30	67	12	4	4	8	8
2004–05	HK SKP Poprad	Slovak	53	9	23	32	54	5	1	2	3	0
2005–06	HK SKP Poprad	Slovak	54	16	24	40	64	15	3	9	12	16
2006–07	HK SKP Poprad	Slovak	21	2	7	9	20	—	—	—	—	—
2006–07	HK Nitra	Slovak	21	0	5	5	28	6	0	1	1	6
2007–08	MHK Kezmarok	Slovak	45	8	10	18	16	—	—	—	—	—
2008–09	MHK Kezmarok	Slovak	32	5	7	12	28	—	—	—	—	—
2009–10	HK Spisska Nova Ves	Slovak	47	14	24	38	34	—	—	—	—	—
2010–11	HC Presov 07	Slovak2	22	7	10	17	26	—	—	—	—	—
2010–11	HK Partizan Beograd	Slohokej	—	—	—	—	—	6	0	3	3	2
Slovak totals			792	190	382	572	507	69	22	32	54	40
