= Arne Kroták =

Czech-born Slovak ice hockey player

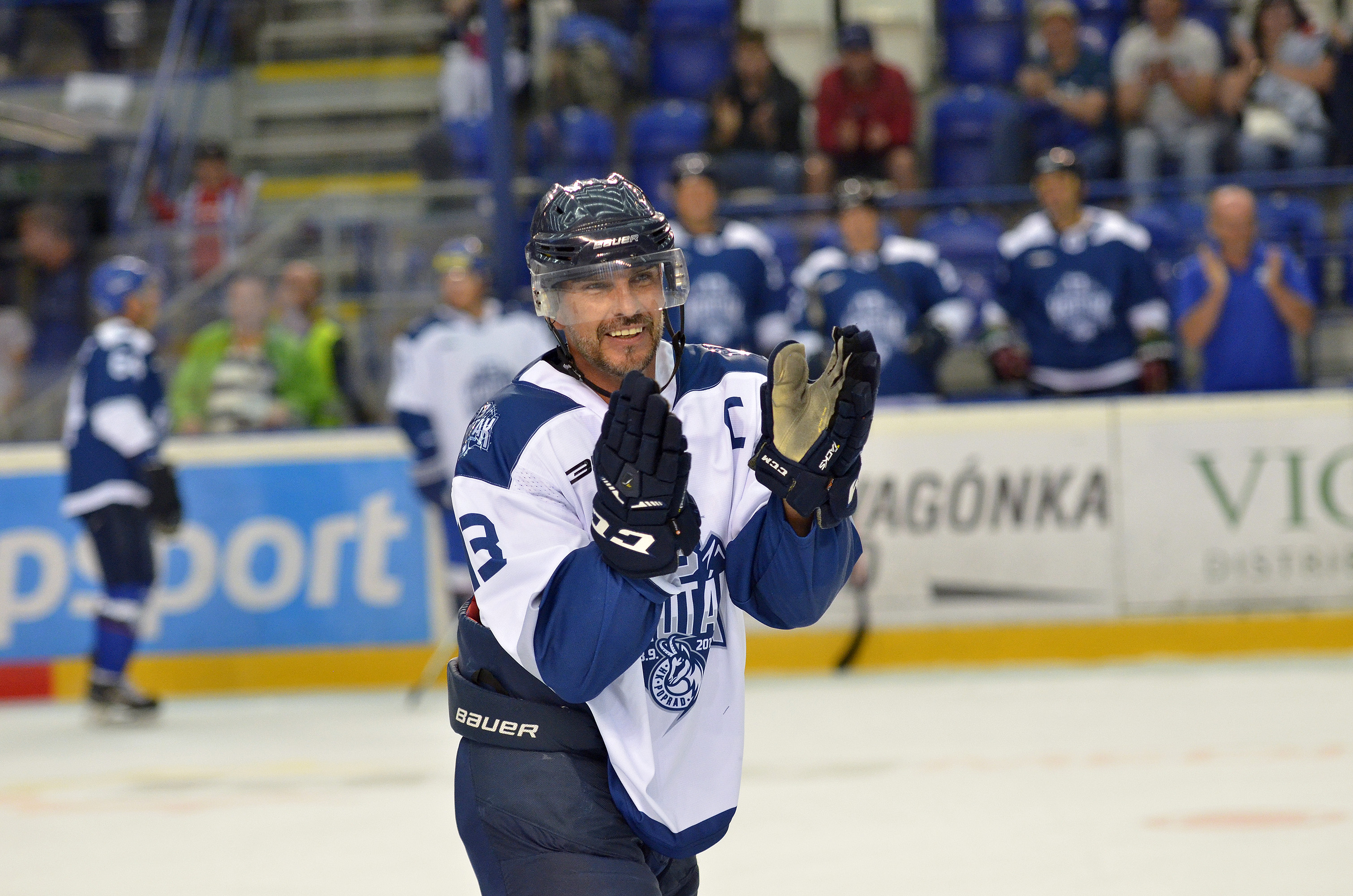
- Kroták said good-bye to his career
- Born: June 6, 1972 (age 53) Třinec, Czechoslovakia
- Height: 5 ft 9 in (175 cm)
- Weight: 176 lb (80 kg; 12 st 8 lb)
- Position: Left wing
- Shot: Left
- Played for: HK Poprad; HC Košice; PSG Berani Zlín; HC Oceláři Třinec; Nice hockey Côte d'Azur; HC 46 Bardejov; HK Spišská Nová Ves; MHK Kežmarok
- Playing career: 1990–2019

Arne Kroták (born June 6, 1972) is a Czech-born Slovak former professional ice hockey left winger. Kroták previously played in the Slovak Extraliga for HK Poprad and HC Košice. In the Czech Extraliga for HC Zlín and HC Třinec.

== Career statistics ==
=== Regular season and playoffs ===
Bold indicates led league

			Regular season					Playoffs
Season	Team	League	GP	G	A	Pts	PIM	GP	G	A	Pts	PIM
1990–91	HC Košice	TCH	28	1	2	3	16	—	—	—	—	—
1991–92	HK Poprad	TCH	31	7	8	15	—	5	1	2	3	—
1992–93	HK Poprad	TCH	37	11	10	21	—	—	—	—	—	—
1992–93	HC Košice	TCH	1	0	0	0	0	—	—	—	—	—
1993–94	PSG Berani Zlín	Czech	0	0	0	0	0	3	0	0	0	0
1993–94	HK Poprad	Slovak	34	17	10	27	—	—	—	—	—	—
1994–95	HK Poprad	Slovak	36	15	20	35	6	9	3	6	9	0
1995–96	HC Oceláři Třinec	Czech	3	0	1	1	2	—	—	—	—	—
1995–96	HK Poprad	Slovak	34	16	19	35	50	—	—	—	—	—
1996–97	HK Poprad	Slovak	50	16	24	40	40	—	—	—	—	—
1997–98	HK Poprad	Slovak	43	12	20	32	24	—	—	—	—	—
1998–99	HK Poprad	Slovak	53	27	25	52	52	—	—	—	—	—
1999–00	HK Poprad	Slovak	56	33	28	61	64	6	2	1	3	12
2000–01	HK Poprad	Slovak	51	22	28	50	60	6	2	1	3	4
2001–02	HC Košice	Slovak	50	25	22	47	84	11	2	5	7	20
2002–03	HC Košice	Slovak	52	**28**	25	53	62	13	**7**	7	14	32
2003–04	HC Košice	Slovak	48	21	23	44	38	8	2	4	6	4
2004–05	HC Košice	Slovak	51	26	25	51	70	10	4	4	8	8
2005–06	HK Poprad	Slovak	45	17	23	40	118	15	**13**	6	**19**	59
2006–07	HK Poprad	Slovak	51	26	23	49	46	6	0	3	3	8
2007–08	HK Poprad	Slovak	51	19	30	49	84	5	2	2	4	4
2008–09	HK Poprad	Slovak	50	23	30	53	90	—	—	—	—	—
2009–10	HK Poprad	Slovak	44	16	30	46	56	3	1	1	2	12
2010–11	HK Poprad	Slovak	52	20	38	58	46	18	2	3	5	28
2011–12	HK Poprad	Slovak	51	20	19	39	88	3	2	0	2	10
2012–13	Nice hockey Côte d'Azur	French.1	24	20	19	39	30	2	0	2	2	10
2013–14	HK Poprad	Slovak	52	18	28	46	36	5	0	1	1	32
2013–14	HC 46 Bardejov	Slovak.1	1	1	1	2	0	1	2	0	2	0
2014–15	HK Poprad	Slovak	52	16	25	41	54	12	**9**	2	11	4
2015–16	HK Poprad	Slovak	49	14	27	41	83	5	2	1	3	2
2016–17	HK Poprad	Slovak	51	14	21	35	28	4	0	1	1	2
2017–18	HK Poprad	Slovak	7	1	0	1	0	—	—	—	—	—
2017–18	HK Spišská Nová Ves	Slovak.1	1	0	0	0	0	—	—	—	—	—
2018–19	MHK Kežmarok	Slovak.2	5	2	3	5	0	—	—	—	—	—
SVK totals			1,113	462	563	1,025	1279	146	57	53	110	249

Medal record

Men's ice hockey

Representing Czechoslovakia

European Junior Championships
Bronze medal – third place	1990 Sweden	

=== International ===
Year	Team	Event	Result	GP	G	A	Pts	PIM
1990	Czechoslovakia	EJC	3rd place, bronze medalist(s)	6	1	3	4	0
Junior totals				6	1	3	4	0

== Awards and achievements ==
- HK Poprad retired Kroták's no. 13 jersey on 13 September 2019.

== Records ==
- HK Poprad team record for career games played (980)
- HK Poprad team record for career goals (380)
- HK Poprad team record for career assists (486)
- HK Poprad team record for career points (866)
- HK Poprad team record for career playoff games played (102)
- HK Poprad team record for career playoff goals (39)
- HK Poprad team record for career playoff assists (30)
- HK Poprad team record for career playoff points (69)
