= Igor Rataj =

Slovak ice hockey player

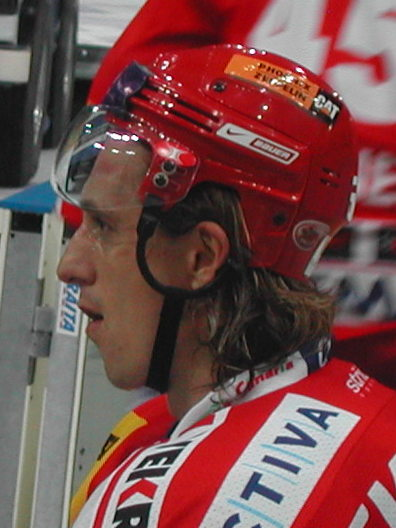
- Igor Rataj during a game between HC Slavia Praha - HC Mountfield
- Born: 3 November 1973 (age 52) Poprad, Slovakia
- Height: 6 ft 2 in (188 cm)
- Weight: 220 lb (100 kg; 15 st 10 lb)
- Position: Forward
- Shot: Left
- Played for: HK Poprad; HC Košice; HC Slovan Bratislava
- Playing career: 1992–2017

Igor Rataj (born 3 November 1973, in Poprad) is a Slovak professional ice hockey player who played with HC Slovan Bratislava in the Slovak Extraliga.

He also played for HK Poprad, Amur Khabarovsk, HC Bílí Tygři Liberec, HC Znojemští Orli, HC Plzeň, HC Slavia Praha and HC Košice.

== Career statistics ==
			Regular season					Playoffs
Season	Team	League	GP	G	A	Pts	PIM	GP	G	A	Pts	PIM
1992–93	TJ ŠKP PS Poprad	Czech	16	1	1	2	—	—	—	—	—	—
1992–93	MHK Kežmarok	Czech2	24	10	9	19	—	—	—	—	—	—
1993–94	HC SKP PS Poprad	Slovak	33	9	6	15	16	—	—	—	—	—
1994–95	HC SKP PS Poprad	Slovak	29	6	11	17	36	3	0	0	0	6
1995–96	HC SKP PS Poprad	Slovak	42	17	15	32	46	—	—	—	—	—
1996–97	HC SKP PS Poprad	Slovak	47	18	24	42	58	—	—	—	—	—
1997–98	HC SKP Poprad	Slovak	44	26	28	54	108	—	—	—	—	—
1997–98	MHK Kezmarok	Slovak2	1	0	0	0	2	—	—	—	—	—
1998–99	HC Slovan Bratislava	Slovak	51	18	26	44	46	—	—	—	—	—
1999–00	HC Slovan Bratislava	Slovak	42	21	20	41	34	8	2	2	4	22
2000–01	HC Slovan Bratislava	Slovak	55	24	34	58	157	8	2	8	10	18
2001–02	Amur Khabarovsk	Russia	12	0	1	1	4	—	—	—	—	—
2001–02	HC Slovan Bratislava	Slovak	36	9	9	18	42	—	—	—	—	—
2002–03	HC Slovan Bratislava	Slovak	52	20	28	48	94	13	2	6	8	30
2003–04	Bili Tygri Liberec	Czech	9	2	2	4	12	—	—	—	—	—
2003–04	HC Znojemsti Orli	Czech	40	11	11	22	74	7	1	2	3	24
2004–05	Bili Tygri Liberec	Czech	50	8	14	22	46	12	4	2	6	14
2005–06	Bili Tygri Liberec	Czech	52	19	12	31	66	4	0	0	0	0
2006–07	HC Lasselsberger Plzen	Czech	10	2	1	3	14	—	—	—	—	—
2006–07	HC Slavia Praha	Czech	38	13	8	21	38	6	1	1	2	2
2007–08	HC Slavia Praha	Czech	52	10	10	20	91	19	3	1	4	22
2008–09	HC Kosice	Slovak	14	2	6	8	26	—	—	—	—	—
2008–09	HK SKP Poprad	Slovak	40	17	20	37	72	—	—	—	—	—
2009–10	HK Poprad	Slovak	47	11	13	24	64	5	1	1	2	6
2010–11	HK Poprad	Slovak	11	1	2	3	10	—	—	—	—	—
2010–11	MHC Martin	Slovak	13	4	0	4	18	—	—	—	—	—
2010–11	MsHK Zilina	Slovak	11	0	5	5	10	—	—	—	—	—
2011–12	EK Zell am See	Austria2	32	20	37	57	71	4	1	3	4	6
2012–13	EK Zell am See	INL	29	25	28	53	44	5	3	3	6	36
2013–14	EK Zell am See	INL	36	33	31	64	74	8	9	9	18	16
2014–15	EK Zell am See	INL	27	17	24	41	76	8	5	12	17	18
2015–16	EK Zell am See	INL	25	6	20	26	101	5	0	1	1	8
2016–17	EK Zell am See	AlpsHL	37	9	16	25	53	—	—	—	—	—
Slovak totals			567	203	247	450	837	51	10	27	37	108
Czech totals			267	66	59	125	341	48	9	6	15	62
