= Peter Junas =

Slovak ice hockey player

- Born: 16 December 1968 (age 56); Poprad, Czechoslovakia
- Height: 6 ft 2 in (188 cm)
- Weight: 196 lb (89 kg; 14 st 0 lb)
- Position: Left wing
- Shot: Right
- Played for: TJ ŠKP PS Poprad; HC Slovan Bratislava; MHK Kežmarok
- Playing career: 1991–2007

Peter Junas (born December 16, 1968) is a Slovak former professional ice hockey player who played with HC Slovan Bratislava in the Slovak Extraliga.

== Career statistics ==
			Regular season					Playoffs
Season	Team	League	GP	G	A	Pts	PIM	GP	G	A	Pts	PIM
1991–92	TJ ŠKP PS Poprad	Czechoslovakia	32	6	5	11	—	5	2	1	3	—
1992–93	TJ ŠKP PS Poprad	Czechoslovakia	40	6	11	17	—	—	0	2	2	—
1993–94	HC ŠKP PS Poprad	Slovak	24	8	6	14	—	—	—	—	—	—
1994–95	HC ŠKP PS Poprad	Slovak	33	6	7	13	39	9	0	4	4	6
1995–96	HC ŠKP PS Poprad	Slovak	44	12	20	32	47	—	—	—	—	—
1996–97	HC ŠKP PS Poprad	Slovak	50	20	28	48	—	—	—	—	—	—
1997–98	HC ŠKP PS Poprad	Slovak	43	19	42	61	49	—	—	—	—	—
1998–99	HC ŠKP PS Poprad	Slovak	54	29	27	56	44	—	—	—	—	—
1999–00	HC ŠKP PS Poprad	Slovak	54	19	29	48	22	7	0	2	2	14
2000–01	HC ŠKP PS Poprad	Slovak	52	17	25	42	70	6	1	2	3	0
2001–02	HC ŠKP PS Poprad	Slovak	54	15	25	40	39	—	—	—	—	—
2002–03	HC Slovan Bratislava	Slovak	54	22	26	48	28	13	4	3	7	22
2003–04	HC Slovan Bratislava	Slovak	4	0	1	1	0	5	0	0	0	0
2004–05	HC Slovan Bratislava	Slovak	52	13	15	28	59	13	3	9	12	47
2005–06	HC Slovan Bratislava	Slovak	51	12	17	29	66	2	0	0	0	27
2006–07	MHK Kežmarok	Slovak2	36	18	22	40	94	13	5	4	9	34
Slovak totals			569	192	268	460	463	55	8	20	28	116
