= Štefan Fabian =

- Born: 10 February 1981 (age 44) Košice, Czechoslovakia
- Height: 175 cm (5 ft 9 in)
- Weight: 86 kg (190 lb; 13 st 8 lb)
- Position: Defence
- Shot: Right
- Played for: HC Košice; HK 36 Skalica; HK Poprad; HK Nitra; Yertis Pavlodar; HK Spišská Nová Ves
- Playing career: 1999–2021

Štefan Fabian (born 10 February 1981) is a Slovak former professional ice hockey player. Fabian previously played in the Slovak Extraliga for HC Košice, HK 36 Skalica, HK Nitra and HK Poprad. In the Kazakhstan Hockey Championship for Yertis Pavlodar.

== Career statistics ==
=== Regular season and playoffs ===
			Regular season					Playoffs
Season	Team	League	GP	G	A	Pts	PIM	GP	G	A	Pts	PIM
1999–00	HC Košice	Slovak	40	1	3	4	12	—	—	—	—	—
2000–01	HC Košice	Slovak	45	4	10	14	41	3	0	1	1	2
2001–02	HK 36 Skalica	Slovak	49	1	3	4	45	—	—	—	—	—
2002–03	HK 36 Skalica	Slovak	47	1	11	12	22	7	1	0	1	4
2003–04	HC Košice	Slovak	53	0	4	4	10	8	0	1	1	8
2004–05	HK Poprad	Slovak	40	0	6	6	88	5	1	0	1	6
2005–06	HK Poprad	Slovak	54	2	7	9	32	15	0	1	1	4
2006–07	HK Poprad	Slovak	46	3	7	10	18	6	0	1	1	2
2007–08	HK Poprad	Slovak	29	2	7	9	10	15	5	0	0	2
2008–09	HK Poprad	Slovak	56	7	18	25	16	—	—	—	—	—
2009–10	HK Poprad	Slovak	47	7	17	24	14	4	0	0	0	0
2010–11	HK Nitra	Slovak	52	5	7	12	43	5	0	2	2	0
2011–12	HK Poprad	Slovak	53	2	8	10	55	6	1	2	3	0
2012–13	Yertis Pavlodar	Kazakh	10	0	1	1	8	—	—	—	—	—
2012–13	HK Poprad	Slovak	29	0	3	3	10	7	0	1	1	27
2013–14	HK Poprad	Slovak	48	2	11	13	14	5	1	0	1	4
2014–15	HK Poprad	Slovak	56	6	10	16	24	8	2	2	4	0
2015–16	HK Poprad	Slovak	50	7	12	19	27	5	0	2	2	0
2016–17	HK Poprad	Slovak	56	5	16	21	24	4	0	0	0	2
2017–18	HK Poprad	Slovak	44	0	10	10	8	4	1	0	1	0
2018–19	HK Poprad	Slovak	51	1	9	10	10	10	0	1	1	2
2019–20	HK Poprad	Slovak	27	0	3	3	0	—	—	—	—	—
2019–20	HK Spišská Nová Ves	Slovak.1	9	2	1	3	0	—	—	—	—	—
2020–21	HK Spišská Nová Ves	Slovak.1	31	1	15	16	10	15	1	7	8	6
Slovak totals			972	56	182	238	523	117	12	19	31	65

Medal record

Representing Slovakia

Ice hockey

IIHF World U18 Championships
Bronze medal – third place	1999 Germany	

=== International ===
Year	Team	Event	Result	GP	G	A	Pts	PIM
1999	Slovakia	WJC18	3rd place, bronze medalist(s)	7	0	2	2	6
Junior totals				7	0	2	2	6
