= Richard Lintner =

Slovak ice hockey player

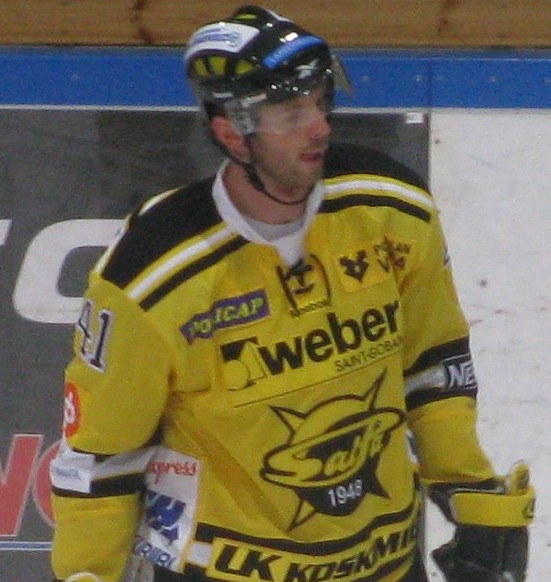
- Lintner playing for SaiPa
- Born: November 15, 1977 (age 48) Trenčín, Czechoslovakia
- Height: 6 ft 2 in (188 cm)
- Weight: 213 lb (97 kg; 15 st 3 lb)
- Position: Defence
- Shot: Right
- Played for: HK Dukla Trenčín; Nashville Predators; Modo Hockey; New York Rangers; Pittsburgh Penguins; Djurgårdens IF; HC Fribourg-Gottéron; Skellefteå AIK; Färjestad BK; SaiPa; Lukko; ŠHK 37 Piešťany; Rögle BK; Dinamo Minsk
- National team: Slovakia
- NHL draft: 119th overall, 1996; Phoenix Coyotes
- Playing career: 1996–2015

Richard Lintner (born November 15, 1977) is a Slovak former professional ice hockey defenceman who last played for HC Dinamo Minsk of the Kontinental Hockey League and current television presenter. He previously played in the National Hockey League (NHL) for the Nashville Predators, New York Rangers and the Pittsburgh Penguins.

== International play ==
Medal record

Representing Slovakia

Ice hockey

IIHF World Championships
Gold medal – first place	2002 Sweden	
Bronze medal – third place	2003 Finland	

Lintner represented Slovakia at the World Championships every year from 2001 until 2005. On December 29, 2009, Lintner was named to Team Slovakia for the 2010 Winter Olympics in Vancouver. However, he was replaced by Ivan Baranka.

== Career statistics ==
=== Regular season and playoffs ===
			Regular season					Playoffs
Season	Team	League	GP	G	A	Pts	PIM	GP	G	A	Pts	PIM
1994–95	HC Dukla Trenčín	SVK Jr	42	12	13	25	20	—	—	—	—	—
1995–96	HC Dukla Trenčín	SVK Jr	30	15	17	32	210	—	—	—	—	—
1995–96	HC Dukla Trenčín	SVK	2	0	0	0	0	—	—	—	—	—
1996–97	HK VTJ Spišská Nová Ves	SVK	35	2	1	3	—	—	—	—	—	—
1997–98	Springfield Falcons	AHL	71	6	9	15	61	3	1	1	2	4
1998–99	Springfield Falcons	AHL	8	0	1	1	16	—	—	—	—	—
1998–99	Milwaukee Admirals	IHL	66	9	16	25	75	—	—	—	—	—
1999–2000	Milwaukee Admirals	IHL	31	13	8	21	37	—	—	—	—	—
1999–2000	Nashville Predators	NHL	33	1	5	6	22	—	—	—	—	—
2000–01	Nashville Predators	NHL	50	3	5	8	22	—	—	—	—	—
2001–02	HC Dukla Trenčín	SVK	6	2	0	2	0	—	—	—	—	—
2001–02	Modo Hockey	SEL	28	12	9	21	85	14	3	0	3	8
2002–03	New York Rangers	NHL	10	1	0	1	0	—	—	—	—	—
2002–03	Hartford Wolf Pack	AHL	26	6	15	21	30	—	—	—	—	—
2002–03	Wilkes–Barre/Scranton Penguins	AHL	6	1	4	5	2	—	—	—	—	—
2002–03	Pittsburgh Penguins	NHL	19	3	2	5	10	—	—	—	—	—
2003–04	Djurgårdens IF	SEL	41	18	13	31	73	4	1	1	2	6
2004–05	HC Fribourg–Gottéron	NLA	23	2	9	11	40	1	0	0	0	0
2005–06	HC Fribourg–Gottéron	NLA	44	14	9	23	86	10	0	2	2	16
2006–07	Skellefteå AIK	SEL	52	9	20	29	46	—	—	—	—	—
2007–08	HC Dukla Trenčín	SVK	5	0	2	2	6	—	—	—	—	—
2007–08	Färjestads BK	SEL	42	8	14	22	50	8	0	0	0	6
2008–09	Dinamo Minsk	KHL	33	7	10	17	40	—	—	—	—	—
2008–09	HC Dukla Trenčín	SVK	2	0	2	2	0	—	—	—	—	—
2009–10	Dinamo Minsk	KHL	33	2	9	11	34	—	—	—	—	—
2009–10	HC Dukla Trenčín	SVK	2	0	0	0	0	—	—	—	—	—
2010–11	SaiPa	SM-l	29	10	10	20	34	—	—	—	—	—
2010–11	HC Dukla Trenčín	SVK	7	1	4	5	8	—	—	—	—	—
2011–12	SaiPa	SM-l	21	2	5	7	41	—	—	—	—	—
2011–12	Lukko	SM-l	26	5	17	22	18	3	0	1	1	14
2012–13	ŠHK 37 Piešťany	SVK	2	0	1	1	0	—	—	—	—	—
2012–13	Rögle BK	SEL	12	3	5	8	10	10	0	1	1	8
2012–13	HC Dukla Trenčín	SVK	5	3	2	5	4	—	—	—	—	—
2013–14	Dinamo Minsk	KHL	18	3	1	4	47	11	1	6	7	4
2013–14	HC Dukla Trenčín	SVK	19	3	4	7	24	—	—	—	—	—
2014–15	HC Dukla Trenčín	SVK	17	2	5	7	20	—	—	—	—	—
SVK totals			66	8	12	20	—	—	—	—	—	—
NHL totals			112	8	12	20	54	—	—	—	—	—
SEL totals			175	50	61	111	264	26	4	1	5	20
KHL totals			84	12	20	32	121	11	1	6	7	4

=== International statistics ===
Year	Team	Event	GP	G	A	Pts	PIM
1996	Slovakia	WJC	6	0	1	1	12
1997	Slovakia	WJC	6	2	1	3	22
2001	Slovakia	WC	7	0	2	2	2
2002	Slovakia	OLY	4	1	1	2	0
2002	Slovakia	WC	9	4	4	8	22
2003	Slovakia	WC	9	1	3	4	2
2004	Slovakia	WC	8	2	3	5	6
2004	Slovakia	WCH	3	0	0	0	2
2005	Slovakia	WC	7	0	0	0	0
2010	Slovakia	WC	6	0	3	3	2
Junior totals			12	2	2	4	34
Senior totals			53	8	16	24	36
