= Jaroslav Kasík =

Czech ice hockey player

- Born: March 28, 1983 (age 41); Prague, Czechoslovakia
- Height: 5 ft 10 in (178 cm)
- Weight: 183 lb (83 kg; 13 st 1 lb)
- Position: Defence
- Shot: Left
- Played for: HC Slovan Ústečtí Lvi; HC Sparta Praha; HC Ocelari Trinec; HC Berounsti Medvedi; Piráti Chomutov; HK SKP Poprad; BK Mlada Boleslav; HC Vitkovice Steel; HC Ceske Budejovice; HC Kobra Praha
- National team: Czech Republic
- NHL draft: Undrafted
- Playing career: 2002–2019

Jaroslav Kasík is a Czech professional ice hockey defenceman who played with HK SKP Poprad in the Slovak Extraliga during the 2010–11 season.

== Career statistics ==
			Regular season					Playoffs
Season	Team	League	GP	G	A	Pts	PIM	GP	G	A	Pts	PIM
1999–00	HC Sparta Praha U18	Czech U18	44	12	18	30	20	7	1	3	4	12
2000–01	HC Sparta Praha U20	Czech U20	43	5	4	9	78	2	0	0	0	2
2001–02	HC Sparta Praha U20	Czech U20	45	8	20	28	115	6	1	0	1	10
2002–03	HC Sparta Praha U20	Czech U20	13	2	8	10	12	3	0	3	3	0
2002–03	HC Slovan Ústečtí Lvi	Czech2	35	1	7	8	26	4	0	2	2	2
2003–04	HC Sparta Praha U20	Czech U20	9	4	5	9	18	—	—	—	—	—
2003–04	HC Ocelari Trinec U20	Czech U20	9	2	4	6	28	1	0	2	2	2
2003–04	HC Sparta Praha	Czech	28	0	5	5	43	—	—	—	—	—
2003–04	HC Ocelari Trinec	Czech	3	0	0	0	2	—	—	—	—	—
2003–04	HC Slovan Ústečtí Lvi	Czech2	7	0	0	0	4	—	—	—	—	—
2004–05	HC Sparta Praha	Czech	5	0	0	0	4	—	—	—	—	—
2004–05	HC Slovan Ústečtí Lvi	Czech2	12	0	0	0	12	—	—	—	—	—
2004–05	HC Berounsti Medvedi	Czech2	33	3	6	9	52	3	0	0	0	4
2005–06	HC Sparta Praha	Czech	7	0	0	0	8	—	—	—	—	—
2005–06	HC Berounsti Medvedi	Czech2	11	1	2	3	8	—	—	—	—	—
2005–06	KLH Chomutov	Czech2	16	1	4	5	26	4	0	0	0	6
2006–07	HK SKP Poprad	Slovak	49	0	8	8	58	6	0	1	1	45
2007–08	HK SKP Poprad	Slovak	54	7	9	16	60	5	0	2	2	31
2008–09	HK SKP Poprad	Slovak	58	5	14	19	107	—	—	—	—	—
2009–10	BK Mlada Boleslav	Czech	48	2	11	13	109	—	—	—	—	—
2010–11	HK Poprad	Slovak	57	2	13	15	72	12	0	5	5	6
2011–12	HC Sparta Praha	Czech	35	0	3	3	32	5	0	0	0	0
2011–12	HC Vitkovice Steel	Czech	10	2	2	4	8	—	—	—	—	—
2012–13	BK Mlada Boleslav	Czech2	41	1	12	13	61	2	0	0	0	4
2013–14	HK Poprad	Slovak	29	0	13	13	54	—	—	—	—	—
2013–14	Motor Ceske Budejovice	Czech2	25	2	2	4	30	—	—	—	—	—
2014–15	HK Poprad	Slovak	56	1	24	25	60	10	0	4	4	4
2015–16	HK Poprad	Slovak	51	7	13	20	77	5	1	1	2	2
2016–17	HC Slovan Usti nad Labem	Czech2	52	3	17	20	46	4	1	1	2	10
2017–18	HC Slavia Praha	Czech2	52	3	16	19	34	8	0	0	0	4
2018–19	HC Kobra Praha	Czech3	25	5	16	21	42	—	—	—	—	—
Czech totals			136	4	21	25	206	17	0	3	3	18
Czech2 totals			284	15	66	81	299	35	1	8	9	48
Slovak totals			354	22	94	116	488	48	3	19	22	98
