= Zdeno Cíger =

Slovak ice hockey player (born 1969)

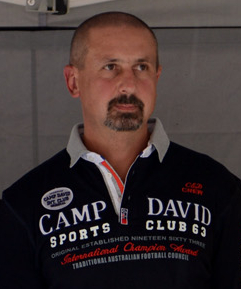
- Born: 19 October 1969 (age 56) Martin, Czechoslovakia
- Height: 6 ft 1 in (185 cm)
- Weight: 190 lb (86 kg; 13 st 8 lb)
- Position: Left wing
- Shot: Left
- Played for: New Jersey Devils; Edmonton Oilers; New York Rangers; Tampa Bay Lightning
- National team: Czechoslovakia and Slovakia
- NHL draft: 54th overall, 1988; New Jersey Devils
- Playing career: 1990–2006

Zdeno Cíger (born 19 October 1969) is a Slovak former professional ice hockey player and coach. He played for the National Hockey League (NHL)'s New Jersey Devils, Edmonton Oilers, New York Rangers and Tampa Bay Lightning. Cíger was drafted 54th overall in the 1988 NHL Entry Draft by the New Jersey Devils as their 3rd choice. Cíger played in 352 NHL games, amassing 94 goals and 134 assists. His best year came up in the 1995-1996 season when he scored 31 goals and added 39 assists, after which he would leave the NHL before returning 6 years later during the 2001–02 NHL season.

== Achievements ==
- Bronze medal with Slovakia in 2003 Ice Hockey World Championships.
- Bronze medal with Czechoslovakia in 1989 and 1990 Ice Hockey World Championships.
- Team Slovakia - 106 games played / 34 goals
- Team Czechoslovakia - 43 games played / 13 goals
- Slovak Extraliga title with HC Slovan Bratislava in season 2006/2007

== Career statistics ==
=== Regular season and playoffs ===
			Regular season					Playoffs
Season	Team	League	GP	G	A	Pts	PIM	GP	G	A	Pts	PIM
1986–87	ASVŠ Dukla Trenčín	TCH U20	—	—	—	—	—	—	—	—	—	—
1987–88	ASVŠ Dukla Trenčín	TCH	8	3	4	7	2	—	—	—	—	—
1988–89	ASVŠ Dukla Trenčín	TCH	32	15	7	22	18	11	3	8	11	—
1989–90	ASVŠ Dukla Trenčín	TCH	44	17	24	41	—	9	1	4	5	—
1990–91	New Jersey Devils	NHL	45	8	17	25	8	6	0	2	2	4
1990–91	Utica Devils	AHL	8	5	4	9	2	—	—	—	—	—
1991–92	New Jersey Devils	NHL	20	6	5	11	10	7	2	4	6	0
1992–93	New Jersey Devils	NHL	27	4	8	12	2	—	—	—	—	—
1992–93	Edmonton Oilers	NHL	37	9	15	24	6	—	—	—	—	—
1993–94	Edmonton Oilers	NHL	84	22	35	57	8	—	—	—	—	—
1994–95	Edmonton Oilers	NHL	5	2	2	4	0	—	—	—	—	—
1994–95	HC Dukla Trenčín	SVK	34	23	25	48	8	9	2	9	11	2
1995–96	Edmonton Oilers	NHL	78	31	39	70	41	—	—	—	—	—
1996–97	HC Slovan Bratislava	SVK	44	26	27	53	—	2	1	3	4	—
1997–98	HC Slovan Bratislava	SVK	36	14	31	45	2	11	6	10	16	4
1998–99	HC Slovan Bratislava	SVK	40	26	32	58	8	9	3	10	13	2
1999–2000	HC Slovan Bratislava	SVK	51	23	39	62	48	8	1	8	9	0
2000–01	HC Slovan Bratislava	SVK	53	17	32	49	22	8	6	3	9	16
2001–02	New York Rangers	NHL	29	6	7	13	16	—	—	—	—	—
2001–02	Tampa Bay Lightning	NHL	27	6	6	12	10	—	—	—	—	—
2002–03	HC Slovan Bratislava	SVK	28	10	24	34	28	13	5	6	11	10
2003–04	HC Slovan Bratislava	SVK	51	22	38	60	38	6	0	4	4	31
2004–05	HC Slovan Bratislava	SVK	7	4	4	8	2	19	6	15	21	14
2005–06	HC Slovan Bratislava	SVK	11	4	7	11	12	4	1	1	2	0
TCH totals			95	38	41	79	—	9	1	4	5	—
NHL totals			352	94	134	228	101	13	2	6	8	4
SVK totals			355	169	259	428	—	89	31	69	100	—

=== International ===
Year	Team	Event	GP	G	A	Pts	PIM
1987	Czechoslovakia	EJC	7	3	3	6	18
1988	Czechoslovakia	WJC	7	5	0	5	0
1989	Czechoslovakia	WJC	7	3	7	10	10
1989	Czechoslovakia	WC	10	2	5	7	8
1990	Czechoslovakia	WC	10	5	1	6	4
1991	Czechoslovakia	CC	5	0	0	0	2
1995	Slovakia	WC B	7	7	4	11	4
1996	Slovakia	WC	5	1	1	2	2
1996	Slovakia	WCH	3	1	0	1	2
1997	Slovakia	WC	8	4	1	5	12
1998	Slovakia	OLY	4	1	1	2	4
1998	Slovakia	WC	6	0	1	1	2
1999	Slovakia	WC	6	2	4	6	4
2001	Slovakia	WC	7	1	2	3	2
2003	Slovakia	WC	1	0	0	0	0
Junior totals			21	11	10	21	28
Senior totals			65	17	16	33	38
