= Martin Štrbák =

Slovak ice hockey player (born 1975)

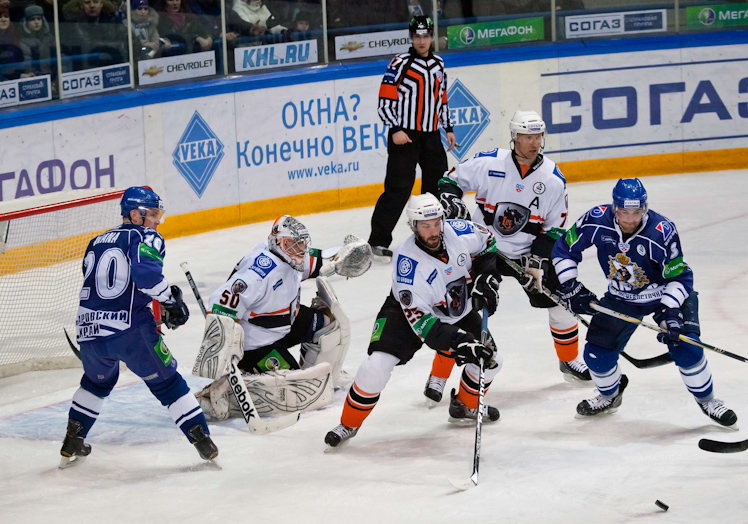
- Martin Strbak defends player to the right
- Born: January 15, 1975 (age 51) Prešov, Czechoslovakia
- Height: 6 ft 3 in (191 cm)
- Weight: 211 lb (96 kg; 15 st 1 lb)
- Position: Defence
- Shot: Left
- Played for: Los Angeles Kings; Pittsburgh Penguins
- National team: Slovakia
- NHL draft: 224th overall, 1993; Los Angeles Kings
- Playing career: 1994–2015

Martin Štrbák (born January 15, 1975) is a Slovak former professional ice hockey player.

== Biography ==
Štrbák played in the 1989 Quebec International Pee-Wee Hockey Tournament with a youth ice hockey team from Czechoslovakia. He was drafted by the Los Angeles Kings in the 9th round of the 1993 NHL entry draft, and also played for the Pittsburgh Penguins in the (2003–04) season.

Štrbák was part of the Slovakian team which won the 2002 IIHF World Championships.

Štrbák was a player for the Lokomotiv Yaroslavl teams which won back-to-back Russian Super League championships in 2002 and 2003. He formerly played for HC Pardubice in the Czech Extraliga and Metallurg Magnitogorsk of the former Russian Super League.

== Career statistics ==
=== Regular season and playoffs ===
			Regular season					Playoffs
Season	Team	League	GP	G	A	Pts	PIM	GP	G	A	Pts	PIM
1994–95	Dragon Prešov	SVK	10	1	0	1	6	—	—	—	—	—
1994–95	HC Slovan Bratislava	SVK	17	0	3	3	0	9	2	1	3	8
1995–96	HC Slovan Bratislava	SVK	44	4	4	8	22	—	—	—	—	—
1996–97	HC Slovan Bratislava	SVK	38	3	2	5	24	—	—	—	—	—
1997–98	HK VTJ Spišská Nová Ves	SVK	33	1	1	2	18	—	—	—	—	—
1998–99	HC Slovan Bratislava	SVK	18	0	0	0	41	—	—	—	—	—
1998–99	HK Trnava	SVK II	15	3	6	9	12	—	—	—	—	—
1999–2000	HC Chemopetrol, a.s.	ELH	50	3	6	9	28	7	2	0	2	12
2000–01	HC Slovnaft Vsetín	ELH	49	2	6	8	46	14	2	1	3	35
2001–02	HC Vsetín	ELH	33	8	9	17	46	—	—	—	—	—
2001–02	Lokomotiv Yaroslavl	RSL	19	1	1	2	8	9	1	2	3	8
2002–03	Lokomotiv Yaroslavl	RSL	27	0	6	6	28	—	—	—	—	—
2002–03	HPK	Liiga	20	4	9	13	68	13	2	3	5	8
2003–04	Los Angeles Kings	NHL	5	2	0	2	8	—	—	—	—	—
2003–04	Manchester Monarchs	AHL	12	0	1	1	25	—	—	—	—	—
2003–04	Pittsburgh Penguins	NHL	44	3	11	14	38	—	—	—	—	—
2004–05	HC Košice	SVK	14	1	4	5	14	—	—	—	—	—
2004–05	CSKA Moscow	RSL	36	2	11	13	34	—	—	—	—	—
2005–06	CSKA Moscow	RSL	50	4	10	14	48	7	0	2	2	4
2006–07	CSKA Moscow	RSL	54	8	22	30	60	12	0	2	2	28
2007–08	Metallurg Magnitogorsk	RSL	56	8	12	20	34	13	2	4	6	16
2008–09	HC Moeller Pardubice	ELH	28	0	4	4	18	—	—	—	—	—
2008–09	Rögle BK	SEL	24	1	5	6	24	—	—	—	—	—
2009–10	HK MVD	KHL	53	8	26	34	46	22	4	8	12	26
2010–11	UHC Dynamo	KHL	34	4	5	9	36	3	0	2	2	2
2011–12	HC Lev Poprad	KHL	35	1	4	5	32	—	—	—	—	—
2012–13	Rögle BK	SEL	23	0	1	1	24	—	—	—	—	—
2012–13	HC Košice	SVK	21	2	7	9	48	15	3	5	8	49
2013–14	HC Košice	SVK	53	9	15	24	109	14	2	5	7	2
2014–15	HC Košice	SVK	54	4	22	26	40	15	3	6	9	10
2015–16	HC Košice	SVK	10	0	1	1	4	—	—	—	—	—
SVK totals			312	25	59	84	326	53	10	17	27	69
RSL totals			242	23	62	85	212	41	3	10	13	56
KHL totals			122	13	35	48	114	25	4	10	14	28

=== International ===
Year	Team	Event	GP	G	A	Pts	PIM
1995	Slovakia	WJC B	7	0	2	2	4
2000	Slovakia	WC	3	1	0	1	8
2001	Slovakia	WC	6	0	1	1	6
2002	Slovakia	WC	9	0	2	2	2
2003	Slovakia	WC	9	0	7	7	12
2004	Slovakia	WC	9	1	1	2	2
2004	Slovakia	WCH	4	0	0	0	4
2005	Slovakia	WC	7	2	5	7	10
2006	Slovakia	OG	6	0	0	0	2
2006	Slovakia	WC	7	1	1	2	8
2007	Slovakia	WC	7	0	1	1	2
2008	Slovakia	WC	5	0	0	0	0
2010	Slovakia	OG	7	0	1	1	2
2011	Slovakia	WC	6	0	0	0	2
Senior totals			85	5	19	24	60
