= Michal Handzuš =

Slovak ice hockey player (born 1977)

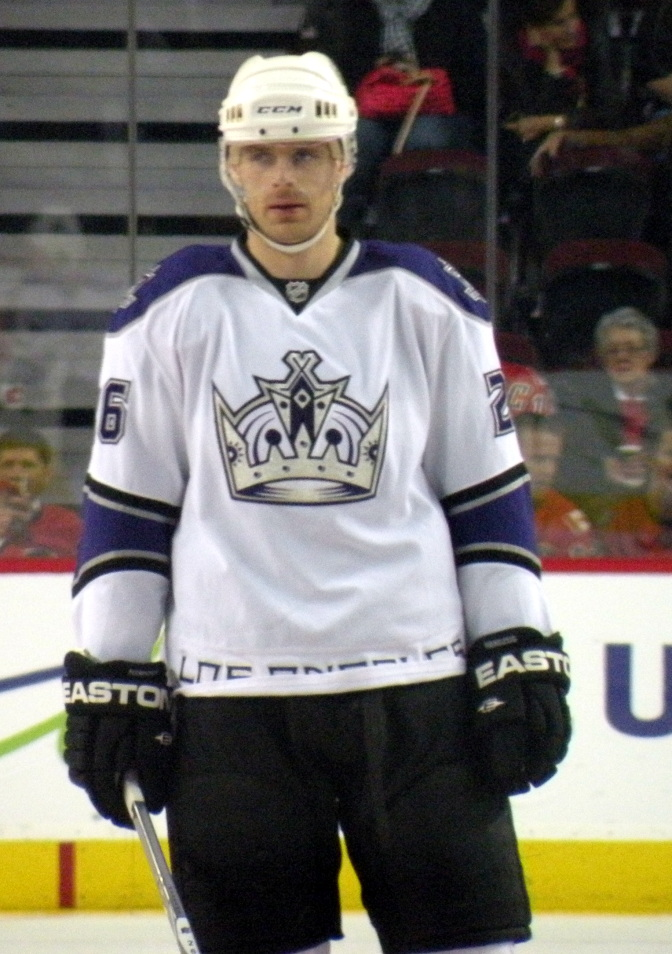
- Handzuš with the Los Angeles Kings in 2009
- Born: 11 March 1977 (age 49) Banská Bystrica, Czechoslovakia
- Height: 6 ft 4 in (193 cm)
- Weight: 219 lb (99 kg; 15 st 9 lb)
- Position: Centre
- Shot: Left
- Played for: HC ’05 Banská Bystrica; HK Poprad; St. Louis Blues; Phoenix Coyotes; Philadelphia Flyers; HKm Zvolen; Chicago Blackhawks; Los Angeles Kings; San Jose Sharks
- National team: Slovakia
- NHL draft: 101st overall, 1995; St. Louis Blues
- Playing career: 1995–2017

Michal Handzuš (Slovak pronunciation: [ˈmixal ˈɦandzuʂ]; born 11 March 1977) is a Slovak former professional ice hockey centre. Handzuš played for hometown club, HC ’05 Banská Bystrica of the Slovak Extraliga before joining the National Hockey League (NHL) in 1998. Handzuš played for the St. Louis Blues, Phoenix Coyotes, Philadelphia Flyers, Los Angeles Kings, San Jose Sharks and the Chicago Blackhawks, with whom he won the Stanley Cup with in 2013.

Handzuš represented Slovakia at several international ice hockey tournaments, including the 2002, 2010 and 2014 Winter Olympics.

== Playing career ==
Handzuš played in the 1991 Quebec International Pee-Wee Hockey Tournament with a youth team from Poprad, Slovakia.

Handzuš, nicknamed "Zeus", was drafted 101st overall in the 1995 NHL entry draft by the St. Louis Blues, playing with them for two-and-a-half seasons from 1998–99 to 2000–01. The Blues' line of Pavol Demitra, Ľuboš Bartečko and Handzuš were known as the "Slovak Pack" line. Handzuš finished second in voting for the Frank J. Selke Trophy, awarded annually to the NHL's top defensive-forward, following the 1999–2000 season.

Handzuš was traded on 13 March 2001, along with Ladislav Nagy, Jeff Taffe and two first-round draft picks, to the Phoenix Coyotes in exchange for Keith Tkachuk. Handzuš then spent two seasons with Phoenix.

On 12 June 2002, Handzuš was traded along with Robert Esche to the Philadelphia Flyers in exchange for Brian Boucher and a third-round draft pick. On 5 December 2002, he became only the second player in NHL history to score a penalty shot goal in overtime. In the 2003–04 season, he finished second on the Flyers with 58 points and later signed a three-year contract extension with Philadelphia during the ensuing off-season. During the 2004–05 NHL lockout, he played for the HKm Zvolen, which reached the playoff finals in the Slovak Extraliga.

On 4 August 2006, Handzuš was traded to the Chicago Blackhawks in exchange for Kyle Calder. Only eight games into his season with Chicago, however, Handzuš suffered a torn anterior cruciate ligament (ACL), which sidelined him for the remainder of the 2006–07 season.

On 2 July 2007, Handzuš signed a four-year, $16 million contract with the Los Angeles Kings.

On 1 July 2011, Handzuš signed a two-year, $5 million contract with the San Jose Sharks. During the lockout-shortened 2012–13 season, on 1 April 2013, Handzuš was traded back to Chicago in exchange for a fourth-round draft pick.

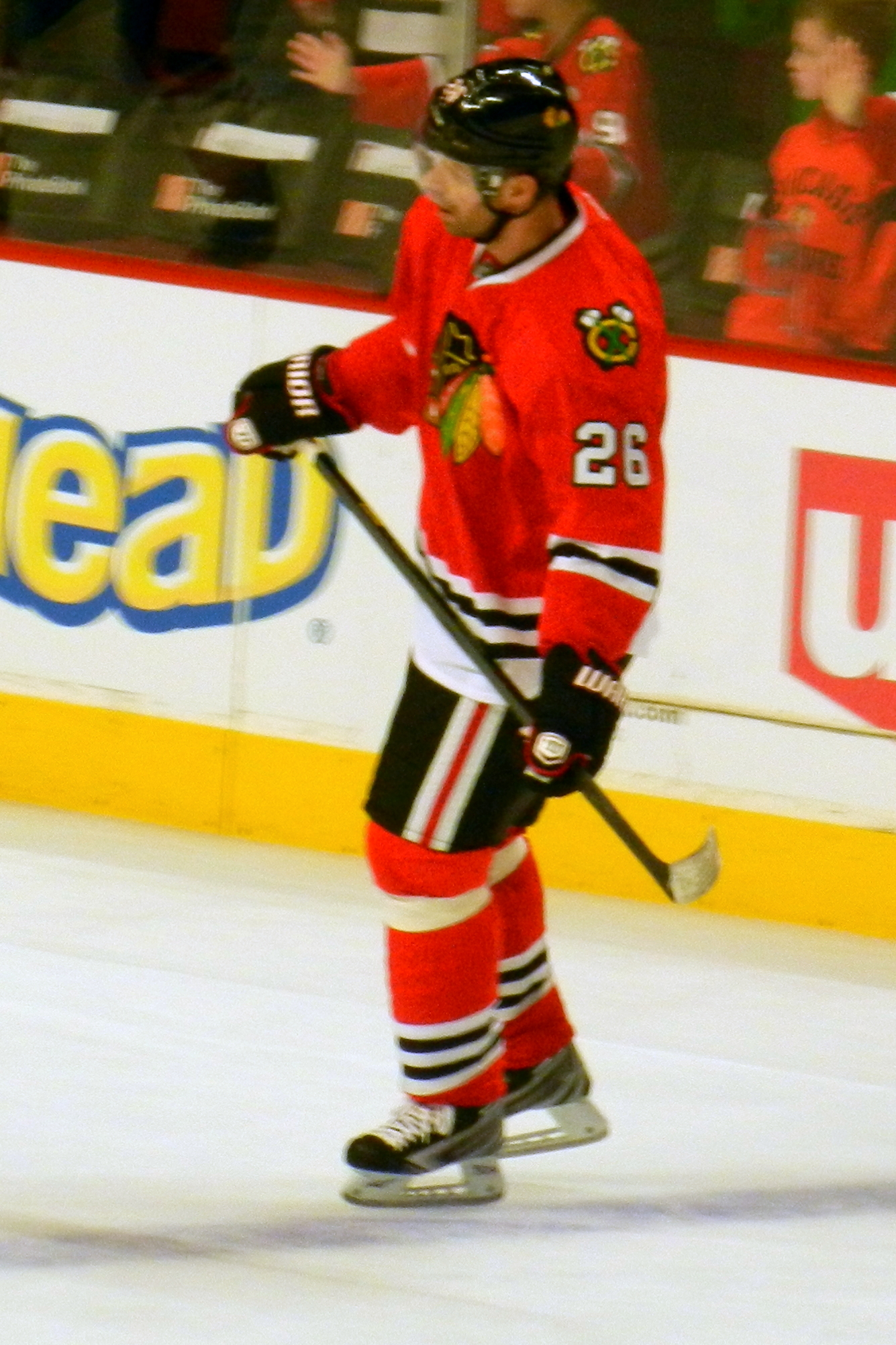
Handzuš with the Chicago Blackhawks in October 2013

On 24 June 2013, Handzuš and the Blackhawks defeated the Boston Bruins 3–2 in game six of the 2013 Stanley Cup Final to win the Stanley Cup. In the following off-season, on 5 July, Handzuš re-signed to a one-year contract to remain with the team. On 19 March 2014, he played in his 1,000th career NHL game.

On 28 May 2014, with the Blackhawks facing elimination in game five of the Western Conference Finals, Handzuš scored a game-winning goal in double-overtime against Los Angeles Kings, the eventual Stanley Cup champions. On 16 June, after the Blackhawks had been eliminated from playoff contention, the team announced that they would not be re-signing Handzuš after the season. He subsequently became an unrestricted free agent on 1 July.

== Management career ==
Post-playing career, Handzuš joined the leadership of the Slovak Ice Hockey Federation, but resigned in September 2022 after the organization chose to continue allowing national team members to play in the KHL despite the ongoing 2022 Russian invasion of Ukraine saying, "It is a fundamental value issue for me, and that is why I cannot imagine my further work in this direction of the organization,” in a statement posted to Twitter.

== Career statistics ==
=== Regular season and playoffs ===
			Regular season					Playoffs
Season	Team	League	GP	G	A	Pts	PIM	GP	G	A	Pts	PIM
1993–94	ŠK Iskra Banská Bystrica	SVK U20	40	23	36	59	—	—	—	—	—	—
1994–95	ŠK Iskra Banská Bystrica	SVK-2	22	15	14	29	10	—	—	—	—	—
1995–96	Iskra Zlatý Bažant Banská Bystrica	SVK U20	6	6	7	13	4	—	—	—	—	—
1995–96	Iskra Zlatý Bažant Banská Bystrica	SVK	19	3	1	4	8	—	—	—	—	—
1996–97	HC ŠKP PS Poprad	SVK	44	15	18	33	24	—	—	—	—	—
1997–98	Worcester IceCats	AHL	69	27	36	63	54	11	2	6	8	10
1998–99	St. Louis Blues	NHL	66	4	12	16	30	11	0	2	2	8
1999–00	St. Louis Blues	NHL	82	25	28	53	44	7	0	3	3	6
2000–01	St. Louis Blues	NHL	36	10	14	24	12	—	—	—	—	—
2000–01	Phoenix Coyotes	NHL	10	4	4	8	21	—	—	—	—	—
2001–02	Phoenix Coyotes	NHL	79	15	30	45	34	5	0	0	0	2
2002–03	Philadelphia Flyers	NHL	82	23	21	44	46	13	2	6	8	6
2003–04	Philadelphia Flyers	NHL	82	20	38	58	82	18	5	5	10	10
2004–05	HKm Zvolen	SVK	33	14	24	38	34	—	—	—	—	—
2005–06	Philadelphia Flyers	NHL	73	11	33	44	38	6	0	2	2	2
2006–07	Chicago Blackhawks	NHL	8	3	5	8	6	—	—	—	—	—
2007–08	Los Angeles Kings	NHL	82	7	14	21	45	—	—	—	—	—
2008–09	Los Angeles Kings	NHL	82	18	24	42	32	—	—	—	—	—
2009–10	Los Angeles Kings	NHL	81	20	22	42	38	6	3	2	5	4
2010–11	Los Angeles Kings	NHL	82	12	18	30	20	6	1	1	2	0
2011–12	San Jose Sharks	NHL	67	7	17	24	18	2	0	0	0	0
2012–13	HC '05 Banská Bystrica	SVK	15	9	10	19	22	—	—	—	—	—
2012–13	San Jose Sharks	NHL	28	1	1	2	12	—	—	—	—	—
2012–13	Chicago Blackhawks	NHL	11	1	5	6	4	23	3	8	11	6
2013–14	Chicago Blackhawks	NHL	59	4	12	16	16	19	2	1	3	8
2014–15	HC '05 Banská Bystrica	SVK	22	7	11	18	16	18	3	9	12	2
2015–16	HC '05 Banská Bystrica	SVK	40	12	16	28	36	15	1	6	7	12
2016–17	HC '05 Banská Bystrica	SVK	10	1	5	6	27	15	4	6	10	4
SVK totals			183	61	85	146	167	64	13	31	44	24
NHL totals			1,009	185	298	483	498	116	16	30	46	52

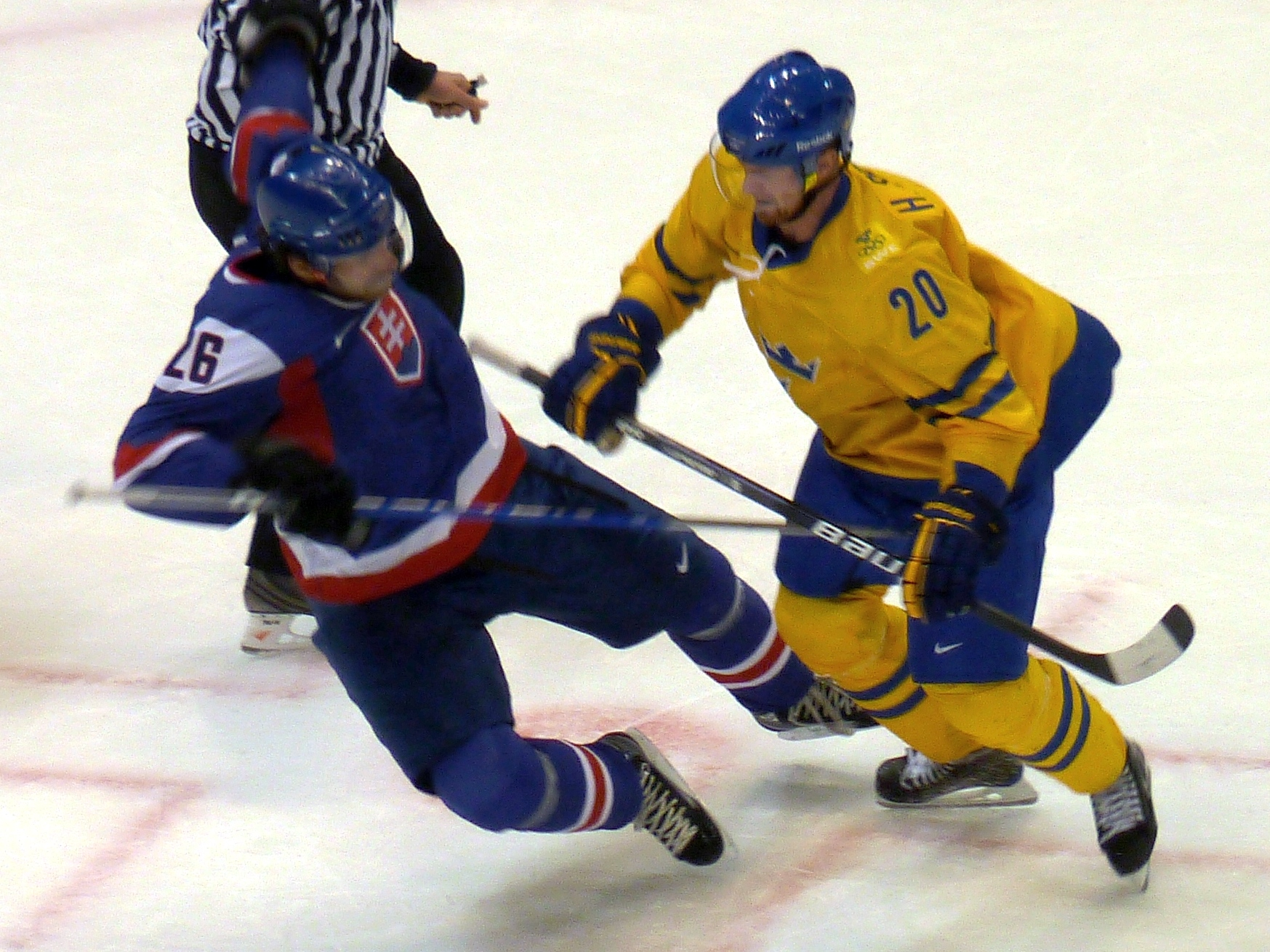
- Handzuš (left) is knocked down by Swedish centre Henrik Sedin during the 2010 Winter Olympics.

Medal record

Representing Slovakia

Ice hockey

World Championships
Gold medal – first place	2002 Sweden	
Silver medal – second place	2000 Russia	
Silver medal – second place	2012 Finland/Sweden	

=== International ===
Year	Team	Event	GP	G	A	Pts	PIM
1995	Slovakia	EJC B	5	5	3	8	4
1996	Slovakia	WJC	6	0	3	3	2
1997	Slovakia	WJC	6	2	4	6	2
2000	Slovakia	WC	6	1	4	5	4
2002	Slovakia	OG	2	1	0	1	6
2002	Slovakia	WC	6	1	4	5	4
2005	Slovakia	WC	7	3	0	3	2
2009	Slovakia	WC	6	0	4	4	6
2010	Slovakia	OG	7	3	3	6	0
2011	Slovakia	WC	5	0	2	2	0
2012	Slovakia	WC	8	2	5	7	0
2014	Slovakia	OG	4	0	2	2	0
Junior totals			17	7	10	17	8
Senior totals			51	11	24	35	22

== Awards and achievements ==
This is the list of achievements of Michal Handzuš:

Award	Year(s)
AHL Player of the Week	5 April 1998
Slovak Extraliga All-Stars Team	2004–05
IIHF World Championship Medal	Gold: 2002, Silver: 2000, 2012
Stanley Cup champion	2013

== See also ==
- Slovaks in the NHL
