= Špilár =

Špilár is a Slovak surname. Notable people with the surname include:

- Gabriel Spilar, formerly Špilár, (born 1980) Slovak ice hockey player
- Marek Špilár (1975–2013) Slovak football player
