= Lukáš Hvila =

Slovak ice hockey left winger

- Born: November 30, 1981 (age 44) Poprad, Czechoslovakia
- Height: 5 ft 9 in (175 cm)
- Weight: 196 lb (89 kg; 14 st 0 lb)
- Position: Left wing
- Shoots: Right
- Slovak team Former teams: HK Dukla Michalovce; HK Poprad; HC Košice; MsHK Žilina; HKm Zvolen; HC Plzeň; HC '05 Banská Bystrica; HK Acroni Jesenice; Beibarys Atyrau; HC Nové Zámky
- Playing career: 1999–present

Lukáš Hvila (born November 30, 1981) is a Slovak professional ice hockey left winger who currently plays for HK Dukla Michalovce in the Tipsport Liga.

== Career ==
Hvila previously played for HK Poprad, HC Košice, MsHK Žilina, HKm Zvolen, HC '05 Banská Bystrica and HC Nové Zámky. He also played 49 games in the Czech Extraliga for HC Plzeň during the 2009–10 season.
