= Ľubomír Malina =

Slovak ice hockey player

- Born: 15 August 1991 (age 33); Kežmarok, Slovakia
- Height: 6 ft 2 in (188 cm)
- Weight: 187 lb (85 kg; 13 st 5 lb)
- Position: Defence
- Shoots: Left
- Slovak team Former teams: HK Poprad; HK Orange 20; HC Prešov; HC ZUBR Přerov; AZ Havířov; Vlci Žilina; HK Spišská Nová Ves
- Playing career: 2010–present

Ľubomír Malina (born 15 August 1991) is a Slovak professional ice hockey defenceman who currently plays professionally in Slovakia for HK Poprad of the Slovak Extraliga.

== Career statistics ==
=== Regular season and playoffs ===
			Regular season					Playoffs
Season	Team	League	GP	G	A	Pts	PIM	GP	G	A	Pts	PIM
