= Jaroslav Kmiť =

Slovak ice hockey player

- Born: September 12, 1979 (age 45); Košice, Czechoslovakia
- Height: 5 ft 9 in (175 cm)
- Weight: 165 lb (75 kg; 11 st 11 lb)
- Position: Left wing
- Shoots: Right
- team Former teams: Free agent HC Košice; HK Poprad; AaB Ishockey; HSC Csíkszereda; Beibarys Atyrau
- National team: Slovakia
- NHL draft: Undrafted
- Playing career: 1998–present

Jaroslav Kmiť (born September 12, 1979) is a Slovak professional ice hockey player who is currently a free agent.

He played in the Slovak Extraliga for HK Poprad and HK Poprad in the Slovak Extraliga during the 2010–11 season. He also played in Denmark's Metal Ligaen for AaB Ishockey, the MOL Liga for HSC Csíkszereda and the Kazakhstan Hockey Championship for Beibarys Atyrau.
