= Adam Cracknell =

Canadian ice hockey player (born 1985)

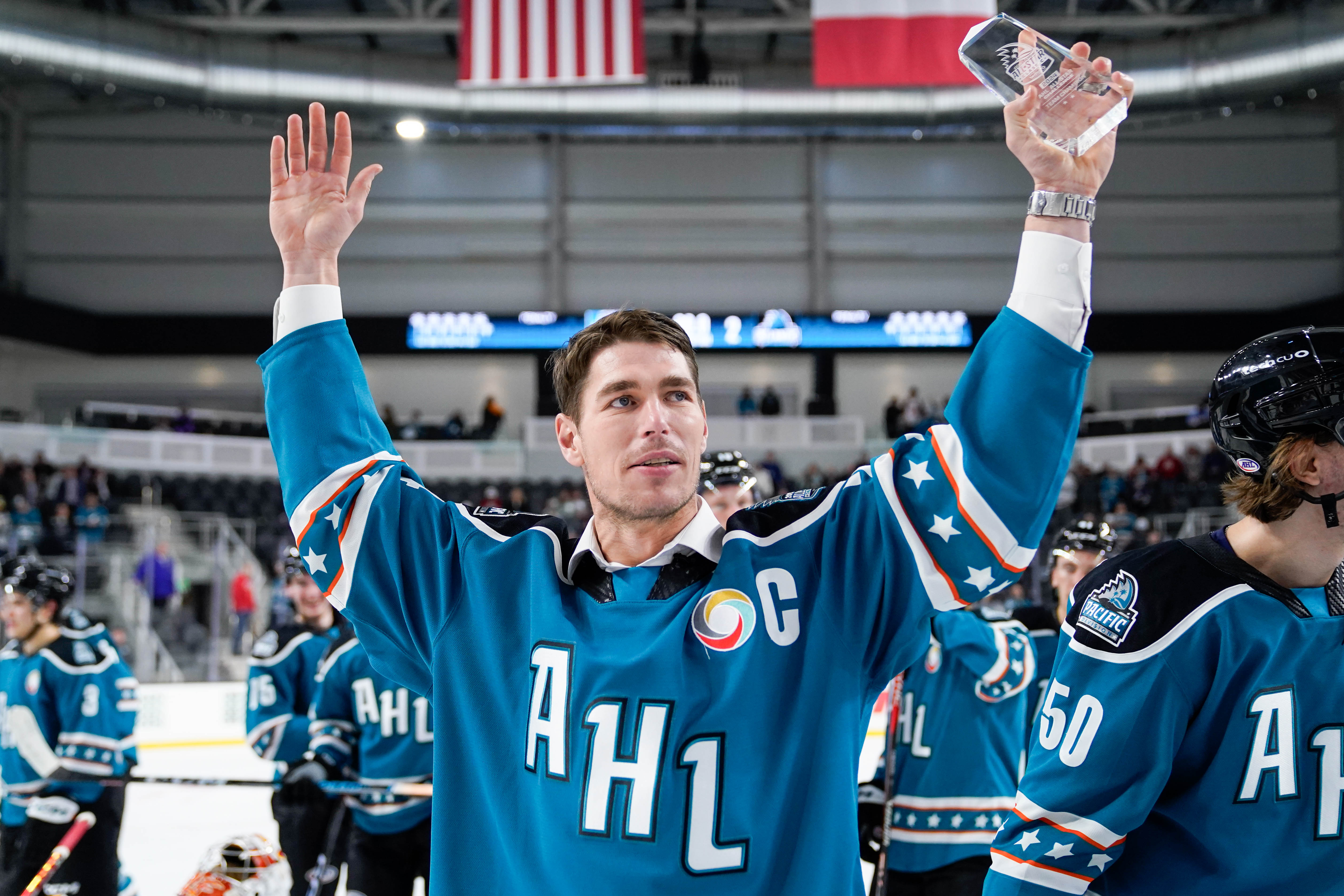
- Cracknell at the 2024 AHL All-Star Game
- Born: July 15, 1985 (age 41) Prince Albert, Saskatchewan, Canada
- Height: 6 ft 3 in (191 cm)
- Weight: 215 lb (98 kg; 15 st 5 lb)
- Position: Forward
- Shoots: Right
- Slovak team Former teams: HK Poprad; St. Louis Blues; Columbus Blue Jackets; Vancouver Canucks; Edmonton Oilers; Dallas Stars; New York Rangers; Anaheim Ducks; Kunlun Red Star
- National team: Canada
- NHL draft: 279th overall, 2004; Calgary Flames
- Playing career: 2006–present

Adam Cracknell (born July 15, 1985) is a Canadian professional ice hockey right winger who plays for HK Poprad in the Tipos Extraliga. He was selected in the ninth round, 279th overall, by the Calgary Flames of the National Hockey League (NHL) in the 2004 NHL entry draft and has previously played for the St. Louis Blues, Columbus Blue Jackets, Vancouver Canucks, Edmonton Oilers, Dallas Stars, New York Rangers, and Anaheim Ducks and played over 200 NHL games.

== Playing career ==
=== Junior ===
Cracknell played junior hockey in the Vancouver Island Amateur Hockey Association (VIAHA) Midget A1 league with the Juan de Fuca Grizzlies Minor Hockey Association, later for the Kootenay Ice in the Western Hockey League (WHL) between 2002 and 2006. Following his second season with the club, he was selected in the ninth round (279th overall) by the Calgary Flames during the 2004 NHL entry draft. As a member of the 2004–05 team, the Ice won the league's regular season championship. During the 2005–06 season, Cracknell led the team in goals (42), assists (51), and points (93); finished second in the WHL in total points; and was named to the WHL West Second All-Star Team.

=== Professional ===
==== Calgary Flames and St. Louis Blues ====
Cracknell spent his first three professional seasons with the Flames' minor league affiliates, skating with the Las Vegas Wranglers of the East Coast Hockey League (ECHL) and the Quad City Flames of the American Hockey League (AHL). However, he never appeared in a game for the club. On July 16, 2009, Cracknell signed a one-year contract with the St. Louis Blues.

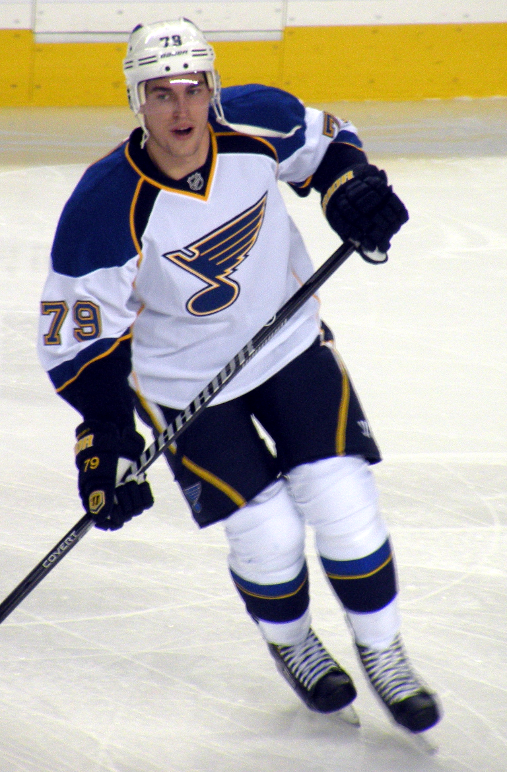
Cracknell during his first tenure with the St. Louis Blues.

Cracknell spent the majority of the 2011 season playing for the Blues affiliate, the Peoria Rivermen of the American Hockey League. The Blues recalled him on March 1, 2011, and on March 12, Cracknell scored his first NHL goal in a game against the Detroit Red Wings. On April 17, 2014, Cracknell scored his first Stanley Cup Playoff goal in Game 1 of the Western Conference Quarter Finals against the Chicago Blackhawks, a series the Blues lost in six games.

==== Los Angeles Kings and Columbus Blue Jackets ====
On July 1, 2014, Cracknell signed a one-year deal as a free agent with the defending Stanley Cup champion Los Angeles Kings. However, during training camp Cracknell failed to impress the Kings, who placed him on waivers. The Columbus Blue Jackets claimed him on October 7. Cracknell appeared in 17 games for the Blue Jackets, recording one assist. Cracknell also appeared in 18 games for the Blue Jackets AHL affiliate, the Springfield Falcons, and recorded three goals and seven points.

==== Return to St. Louis ====
On February 26, 2015, Cracknell was reacquired by the Blues in exchange for future considerations. Cracknell spent the remainder of the season with the Wolves.

==== Vancouver Canucks and Edmonton Oilers ====
On August 25, 2015, the Vancouver Canucks signed Cracknell as a free agent to a one-year, two-way contract. Expected to begin the year with the Utica Comets, Cracknell impressed at training camp and was named to the Canucks' opening night roster for the 2015–16 season. On October 12, 2015, he scored his first goal for the Canucks. Cracknell appeared in a career-high 44 games in Vancouver before he was placed on waivers and claimed by the Edmonton Oilers on February 29, 2016.

==== Dallas Stars ====
On July 3, 2016, Cracknell moved again, signing as a free agent with the Dallas Stars on a one-year, two-way contract. In his first game with the Stars, Cracknell recorded 2 points with a goal and an assist. On March 24, 2017, Cracknell scored his first career hat trick in a 6–1 win against the San Jose Sharks.

==== New York Rangers ====
Cracknell played in a single game with the Stars to start the 2017–18 season before he was placed on waivers. On October 9, 2017, his tenure with the Stars ended, as the New York Rangers claimed Cracknell off waivers. After playing four games with the Rangers, Cracknell was placed on waivers on October 24 and later reassigned to AHL affiliate, the Hartford Wolf Pack.

==== Montreal Canadiens ====
Cracknell appeared in 15 games with the Wolf Pack before he was traded to the Montreal Canadiens in exchange for Peter Holland on November 30, 2017. Cracknell was immediately assigned to the Canadiens' AHL affiliate, the Laval Rocket and played out the remainder of the season, contributing with 27 goals and 48 points in 52 games.

==== Toronto Maple Leafs and Anaheim Ducks ====
On July 1, 2018, a free agent, Cracknell agreed to a one-year, $650,000 contract with the Toronto Maple Leafs. In the ensuing 2018–19 season, Cracknell appeared in 14 games and posted 10 points with AHL affiliate Toronto Marlies before the Maple Leafs traded him to the Anaheim Ducks in exchange for Steven Oleksy on December 10, 2018.

==== Kunlun Red Star ====
After spending his first 13 professional seasons in North America, Cracknell left the NHL and signed his first contract abroad, agreeing to a one-year contract with Chinese club Kunlun Red Star of the KHL on July 4, 2019.

==== Return to Edmonton ====
On September 10, 2020, Cracknell returned to North America and the Oilers' organization, signing a one-year, two-way contract. Assigned to the Oilers AHL affiliate, the Bakersfield Condors for the pandemic delayed 2020-21 season, Cracknell appeared in all 39 regular season games posting 11 goals and 19 assists for 30 points, placing third on the team in scoring. He helped the Condors claim the Pacific Division title in a playoff format by leading the club with 10 points in six postseason games.

An impending unrestricted free agent, Cracknell opted to remain within the Oilers organization, agreeing to a one-year AHL contract to continue with the Condors on June 2, 2021.

==== Tucson Roadrunners and Henderson Silver Knights ====
Following two seasons with the Condors, Cracknell left as a free agent and was signed to a one-year AHL contract with the Tucson Roadrunners, a primary affiliate of the Arizona Coyotes, on July 26, 2022.

On July 5, 2023, Cracknell signed a one-year contract with the Henderson Silver Knights.

==== Slovakia ====
On September 10, 2024, Cracknell signed a one-year contract with HK Poprad of the Slovak Extraliga.

== International play ==
In January 2022, Cracknell was selected to play for Team Canada at the 2022 Winter Olympics.

== Career statistics ==
=== Regular season and playoffs ===
			Regular season					Playoffs
Season	Team	League	GP	G	A	Pts	PIM	GP	G	A	Pts	PIM
2002–03	Kootenay Ice	WHL	67	7	4	11	37	11	0	0	0	2
2003–04	Kootenay Ice	WHL	72	26	35	61	63	4	1	1	2	2
2004–05	Kootenay Ice	WHL	72	19	29	48	65	16	8	8	16	6
2005–06	Kootenay Ice	WHL	72	42	51	93	85	6	1	4	5	6
2005–06	Omaha Ak–Sar–Ben Knights	AHL	6	1	2	3	2	—	—	—	—	—
2006–07	Las Vegas Wranglers	ECHL	31	8	14	22	35	8	3	3	6	6
2007–08	Las Vegas Wranglers	ECHL	61	29	30	59	47	21	9	13	22	4
2007–08	Quad City Flames	AHL	4	1	0	1	0	—	—	—	—	—
2008–09	Quad City Flames	AHL	79	10	16	26	36	—	—	—	—	—
2009–10	Peoria Rivermen	AHL	76	17	21	38	40	—	—	—	—	—
2010–11	Peoria Rivermen	AHL	61	6	19	25	54	4	2	0	2	0
2010–11	St. Louis Blues	NHL	24	3	4	7	8	—	—	—	—	—
2011–12	Peoria Rivermen	AHL	72	23	26	49	54	—	—	—	—	—
2011–12	St. Louis Blues	NHL	2	1	0	1	0	—	—	—	—	—
2012–13	Peoria Rivermen	AHL	49	17	16	33	26	—	—	—	—	—
2012–13	St. Louis Blues	NHL	20	2	4	6	4	5	0	0	0	0
2013–14	St. Louis Blues	NHL	19	0	2	2	0	5	1	0	1	2
2013–14	Chicago Wolves	AHL	28	12	13	25	8	7	3	1	4	2
2014–15	Columbus Blue Jackets	NHL	17	0	1	1	2	—	—	—	—	—
2014–15	Springfield Falcons	AHL	18	3	4	7	2	—	—	—	—	—
2014–15	Chicago Wolves	AHL	22	7	6	13	8	5	1	0	1	4
2015–16	Vancouver Canucks	NHL	44	5	5	10	14	—	—	—	—	—
2015–16	Edmonton Oilers	NHL	8	0	0	0	6	—	—	—	—	—
2016–17	Dallas Stars	NHL	69	10	6	16	12	—	—	—	—	—
2017–18	Dallas Stars	NHL	1	0	0	0	0	—	—	—	—	—
2017–18	New York Rangers	NHL	4	0	0	0	0	—	—	—	—	—
2017–18	Hartford Wolf Pack	AHL	15	2	1	3	6	—	—	—	—	—
2017–18	Laval Rocket	AHL	54	27	21	48	42	—	—	—	—	—
2018–19	Toronto Marlies	AHL	14	3	7	10	10	—	—	—	—	—
2018–19	San Diego Gulls	AHL	32	15	13	28	18	15	7	9	16	0
2018–19	Anaheim Ducks	NHL	2	0	0	0	0	—	—	—	—	—
2019–20	Kunlun Red Star	KHL	52	10	14	24	16	—	—	—	—	—
2020–21	Esbjerg Energy	DEN	17	9	13	22	34	—	—	—	—	—
2020–21	Bakersfield Condors	AHL	39	11	19	30	10	6	3	7	10	0
2021–22	Bakersfield Condors	AHL	58	21	26	47	16	5	1	0	1	2
2022–23	Tucson Roadrunners	AHL	64	21	32	53	34	3	1	1	2	0
2023–24	Henderson Silver Knights	AHL	59	18	17	35	10	—	—	—	—	—
2024–25	HK Poprad	Slovak	54	35	24	59	16	5	3	2	5	25
2025–26	HK Poprad	Slovak	53	24	34	58	72	11	5	7	12	2
NHL totals			210	21	22	43	46	10	1	0	1	2

=== International ===
Year	Team	Event	Result	GP	G	A	Pts	PIM
2022	Canada	OG	6th	5	0	1	1	0
Senior totals				5	0	1	1	0

== Awards and honours ==
Award	Year
WHL
West Second All-Star Team	2006
