= Gabriel Spilar =

Slovak ice hockey player

- Born: December 15, 1980 (age 45) Košice, Czechoslovakia
- Height: 5 ft 10 in (178 cm)
- Weight: 194 lb (88 kg; 13 st 12 lb)
- Position: Right wing
- Shot: Right
- Played for: North Bay Centennials; HC Košice; HKM Zvolen; HC Sparta Praha; HC Slovan Bratislava; HC Zlín; MsHK Žilina; Barys Astana; Espoo Blues; HK Nitra; Kazzinc-Torpedo; Vaasan Sport; MHk 32 Liptovský Mikuláš; HK Dukla Michalovce
- NHL draft: Undrafted
- Playing career: 1999–2020

Gabriel Spilar, formerly Gabriel Špilár (Košice, 15 December 1980) is a Slovak former professional ice hockey forward.

== Personal life ==
Špilár changed his Slovak name to Spilar in 2009, he explained the change to Slovak journalists as because of not having good memories of his stepfather and wanting to distinguish his own name.

== Career statistics ==
=== Regular season and playoffs ===
			Regular season					Playoffs
Season	Team	League	GP	G	A	Pts	PIM	GP	G	A	Pts	PIM

== Awards and honours ==
Award	Year
Slovak Extraliga
Champion	2001, 2005, 2006, 2014, 2015
Playoffs MVP	2015
