= Tomáš Török =

Slovak ice hockey player

- Born: 18 June 1995 (age 30) Martin, Slovakia
- Height: 6 ft 2 in (188 cm)
- Weight: 198 lb (90 kg; 14 st 2 lb)
- Position: Left wing
- Shoots: Left
- Slovak team Former teams: HK Poprad; HK Orange 20; MHC Martin; HC Prešov; HC Nové Zámky; HC 07 Detva; HKM Zvolen; HC '05 Banská Bystrica; HK Dukla Michalovce; HC Slovan Bratislava
- NHL draft: Undrafted
- Playing career: 2011–present

Tomáš Török (born 18 June 1995) is a Slovak professional ice hockey winger playing for HK Poprad of the Slovak Extraliga.

== Career statistics ==
=== Regular season and playoffs ===
			Regular season					Playoffs
Season	Team	League	GP	G	A	Pts	PIM	GP	G	A	Pts	PIM
2011–12	HKM Zvolen	Slovak-Jr.	13	1	3	4	6	10	2	5	7	4
2011–12	HK Orange 20	Slovak.1	3	0	0	0	0	—	—	—	—	—
2012–13	Sherbrooke Phoenix	QMJHL	5	0	1	1	2	—	—	—	—	—
2012–13	Drummondville Voltigeurs	QMJHL	18	4	3	7	12	—	—	—	—	—
2012–13	Sioux City Musketeers	USHL	20	1	2	3	37	—	—	—	—	—
2013–14	HC Slavia Praha	Czech-Jr.	35	13	19	32	22	4	1	2	3	0
2014–15	HC Slavia Praha	Czech-Jr.	30	15	6	21	34	—	—	—	—	—
2014–15	MHC Martin	Slovak-Jr.2	4	3	5	8	6	—	—	—	—	—
2014–15	MHC Martin	Slovak	10	1	5	6	4	4	1	1	2	2
2015–16	HK Poprad	Slovak	13	1	1	2	4	—	—	—	—	—
2015–16	HC Prešov	Slovak.1	11	0	3	3	6	—	—	—	—	—
2015–16	HC Nové Zámky	Slovak.1	9	1	4	5	8	—	—	—	—	—
2016–17	HC 07 Detva	Slovak.1	31	17	21	38	18	11	6	4	10	8
2016–17	HC Nové Zámky	Slovak	2	0	0	0	0	—	—	—	—	—
2017–18	HKM Zvolen	Slovak	35	4	2	6	14	12	1	0	1	8
2018–19	HC '05 Banská Bystrica	Slovak	43	3	3	6	8	—	—	—	—	—
2018–19	HC 07 Detva	Slovak	8	2	2	4	0	9	0	1	1	0
2019–20	HC 07 Detva	Slovak	39	5	3	8	47	—	—	—	—	—
2019–20	HK Dukla Michalovce	Slovak	6	1	3	4	0	—	—	—	—	—
2020–21	HK Dukla Michalovce	Slovak	46	7	4	11	24	9	1	0	1	16
2021–22	HKM Zvolen	Slovak	45	10	7	17	43	10	1	0	1	4
2022–23	HC Slovan Bratislava	Slovak	33	8	2	10	43	6	0	0	0	0
2023–24	HC Slovan Bratislava	Slovak	47	3	4	7	90	4	1	0	1	6
2024–25	HK Poprad	Slovak	51	18	13	31	34	6	2	0	2	2
Slovak totals			378	63	49	112	311	60	7	2	9	38
