= 2002–03 Slovak Extraliga season =

Slovak ice hockey league season

The Slovak Extraliga 2002–03 was the tenth regular season of the Slovak Extraliga, the top level of professional ice hockey in Slovakia.

== Regular season ==
=== Final standings ===
Po.	Club	GP	W	OTW	T	OTL	L	GF	GA	PTS
1.	HC Slovan Bratislava	54	32	1	9	3	9	195	111	107
2.	HKm Zvolen	54	33	2	4	0	15	197	130	107
3.	HC Košice	54	31	2	6	0	15	190	134	103
4.	HC Dukla Trenčín	54	28	1	11	1	13	171	110	97
5.	HK 36 Skalica	54	26	0	5	0	23	144	122	83
6.	MHC Martin	54	21	0	7	1	25	141	136	70
7.	HK ŠKP Poprad	54	19	3	6	2	24	139	176	69
8.	MsHK ŠKP Žilina	54	19	0	6	2	27	147	159	63
9.	HK 32 Liptovský Mikuláš	54	12	1	9	2	30	128	219	47
10.	HK Spišská Nová Ves	54	4	1	5	0	44	86	241	19

Progressed to the Play off
Relegated to the First League

Key - GP: Games played, W: Wins, OTW: Over time wins, T: Ties, OTL: Over time losses, L: Losses, GF: Goals for, GA: Goals against, PTS: Points.

== Playoffs ==
=== Playoff tree ===
Quarterfinals
1.	HC Slovan	4
8.	MsHK Žilina	0
4.	Dukla Trenčín	4
5.	HK 36 Skalica	3
2.	HKm Zvolen	4
7.	ŠKP Poprad	0
3.	HC Košice	4
6.	MHC Martin	0

Semifinals
1.	HC Slovan	4
4.	Dukla Trenčín	1
2.	HKm Zvolen	1
3.	HC Košice	4

Final
1.	HC Slovan	4
3.	HC Košice	0

== Scoring Leaders ==
Regular season

#	Player	Club	GP	G	A	PTS
1.	(Czech Republic) Petr Kořínek	Zvolen	54	23	34	57
2.	(Slovakia) Miroslav Škovira	Košice	54	21	34	55
3.	(Slovakia) Arne Kroták	Košice	51	28	25	53
4.	(Slovakia) Ľubomír Kolník	Zvolen	54	24	26	50
5.	(Slovakia) Peter Junas	Slovan	54	22	26	48
5.	(Slovakia) Richard Hartmann	Skalica	54	22	26	48

Key - GP: Games played, G: Goals, A: Assists, PTS: Points.

== 2002–03 All Star Team ==
Player	Post	Club
(Slovakia) Pavol Rybár	G	Slovan
(Slovakia) Vladimír Vlk	D	Slovan
(Slovakia) Juraj Kledrowetz	D	Košice
(Slovakia) Zdeno Cíger	LW	Slovan
(Slovakia) Richard Kapuš	C	Slovan
(Slovakia) Arne Kroták	RW	Košice
