= 2007–08 Slovak Extraliga season =

The Slovak Extraliga 2007–08 was the fifteenth regular season of the Slovak Extraliga, the top level of professional ice hockey in Slovakia.

== Regular season ==
=== Final standings ===
Po.	Club	GP	W	OTW	OTL	L	GF	GA	PTS
1.	HC Slovan Bratislava	54	35	7	2	10	195	130	119
2.	HC Košice	54	31	5	5	13	188	127	103
3.	MHC Martin	54	32	3	3	16	169	123	102
4.	HK 36 Skalica	54	32	0	4	18	177	136	96
5.	HKm Zvolen	54	28	4	4	18	188	148	92
6.	HC Dukla Trenčín	54	25	8	3	18	170	144	91
7.	HK Aquacity ŠKP Poprad	54	27	4	3	20	171	138	89
8.	MsHK Žilina	54	17	3	5	29	147	174	57
9.	SKI PARK MHK Kežmarok	54	16	2	9	27	141	181	52
10.	HK Ardo Nitra	54	12	4	3	35	127	206	44
11.	MHK 32 LI-PA L. Mikuláš	54	10	4	5	35	126	194	38
12.	HK VSR SR 20	34	-	-	-	-	-	-	-

Key - GP: Games played, W: Wins, OTW: Over time wins, OTL: Over time losses, L: Losses, GF: Goals for, GA: Goals against, PTS: Points.

== Playoffs ==
=== Quarterfinals ===
Team 1.	Score	Team 2.
Slovan Bratislava	4:0	MsHK Žilina
Slovan Bratislava	6:2, 5:3, 2:1, 7:0	MsHK Žilina
HC Košice	4:1	ŠKP Poprad
HC Košice	3:2, 5:0, 5:3, 3:4PS, 6:4	ŠKP Poprad
MHC Martin	3:4	Dukla Trenčín
MHC Martin	4:2, 5:4OT, 4:2, 2:3, 4:5PS, 3:4, 2:3OT	Dukla Trenčín
HK 36 Skalica	4:2	HKm Zvolen
HK 36 Skalica	7:1, 7:4, 1:4, 3:4, 7:1, 8:2	HKm Zvolen

=== Semifinals ===
Team 1.	Score	Team 2.
Slovan Bratislava	4:3	Dukla Trenčín
Slovan Bratislava	4:1, 3:4, 1:3, 0:3, 5:2, 4:1, 2:0	Dukla Trenčín
HC Košice	4:3	HK 36 Skalica
HC Košice	4:1, 3:1, 0:3, 2:4, 3:0, 2:3, 5:4	HK 36 Skalica

=== Finals ===
Team 1.	Score	Team 2.
Slovan Bratislava	4:3	HC Košice
Slovan Bratislava	4:2, 5:1, 2:0, 0:4, 1:5, 2:3OT, 3:2	HC Košice

Abbreviations - OT: Overtime, PS: Shootout

=== Playoff bracket ===
Quarterfinals
1.	HC Slovan	4
8.	MsHK Žilina	0
3.	MHC Martin	3
6.	Dukla Trenčín	4
2.	HC Košice	4
7.	ŠKP Poprad	1
4.	HK 36 Skalica	4
5.	HKm Zvolen	2

Semifinals
1.	HC Slovan	4
6.	Dukla Trenčín	3
2.	HC Košice	4
4.	HK 36 Skalica	3

Final
1.	HC Slovan	4
2.	HC Košice	3

== Scoring Leaders ==
Regular season

#	Player	Club	GP	G	A	PTS
1.	(Slovakia) Žigmund Pálffy	Skalica	46	30	45	75
2.	(Slovakia) Martin Kuľha	Slovan	51	33	30	63
3.	(Slovakia) Peter Klouda	Zvolen	54	11	50	61
4.	(Slovakia) Martin Hujsa	Slovan	51	25	34	59
5.	(Czech Republic) Lukáš Říha	Martin	53	36	19	55

Key - GP: Games played, G: Goals, A: Assists, PTS: Points.

Playoffs

#	Player	Club	GP	G	A	PTS
1.	(Slovakia) Žigmund Pálffy	Skalica	13	7	17	24
2.	(Slovakia) Jaroslav Kmiť	Košice	19	9	10	19
3.	(Slovakia) Andrej Kollár	Trenčín	14	5	12	17
4.	(Slovakia) Martin Kuľha	Slovan	18	8	8	16
4.	(Slovakia) Richard Kapuš	Slovan	18	4	12	16
