= 1993–94 Slovak Extraliga season =

- League: Slovak Extraliga
- Sport: Ice hockey
- Games: 36
- Teams: 10

Regular season
- League Champion: Dukla Trenčín
- Runners-up: HC Košice

Playoffs
- Finals champions: Dukla Trenčín
- Runners-up: HC Košice

Slovak Extraliga seasons
- 1994–95

The 1993–94 Slovak Extraliga season was the inaugural season of the Slovak Extraliga, following the peaceful dissolution of Czechoslovakia midway through the 1992–93 Czechoslovak Extraliga season (which all Slovak and Czech teams played to completion). 10 teams participated in the league, and Dukla Trencin won the championship.

== Standings ==
	Team	GP	Pts	W	T	L	GF:GA	Diff.
1	Dukla Trenčín	36	54	25	4	7	151:88	+63
2	HC Košice	36	51	22	7	7	164:93	+71
3	Slovan Bratislava	36	48	21	6	9	124:93	+31
4	Martimex ZŤS Martin	36	38	14	10	12	106:100	+6
5	HC Nitra	36	38	16	6	14	108:102	+6
6	HK ŠKP Poprad	36	34	15	4	17	106:111	-5
7	HK Spišská Nová Ves	36	30	11	8	17	94:122	-28
8	ZPA Prešov	36	28	11	6	19	96:131	-35
9	HK 32 Liptovský Mikuláš	36	27	11	5	20	109:133	-24
10	ZTK Zvolen	36	12	4	4	28	91:176	-85

== Playoffs ==
=== Semifinal ===
- Dukla Trenčín - Martimex ZŤS Martin 3:1 (7:2,4:2,2:3,3:1)
- HC Košice - Slovan Bratislava 3:2 (7:4,1:2,5:2,1:2,4:1)

=== 3rd place ===
- Slovan Bratislava-Martimex ZŤS Martin 1:2 (7:1,1:4,3:4)

=== Final ===
- Dukla Trenčín - HC Košice 3:2 (2:3,4:1,5:6,3:2,5:1)

== Final rankings ==
Gold medal	Trenčín
Silver medal	Košice
Bronze medal	Martin
4	Slovan Bratislava
5	Nitra
6	Poprad
7	Spišská Nová Ves
8	Prešov
9	Liptovský Mikuláš
10	Zvolen
