= Peter Klouda =

Slovak ice hockey player

- Born: 1 June 1978 (age 46); Poprad, Czechoslovakia
- Position: Centre
- Slovak Extraliga team: HK Poprad
- Playing career: 1996–2018

Peter Klouda (born June 1, 1978) is a Slovak professional ice hockey player who played with HK Poprad in the Slovak Extraliga.
