= 2010–11 Slovak Extraliga season =

2010–11 Slovak Extraliga
- League: Slovak Extraliga
- Sport: Ice hockey
- Duration: 7 September 2010 – 7 April 2011

Regular season
- League Champion: HC Košice
- Top scorer: Miroslav Zálešák (HC Košice)

Playoffs

Finals
- Champions: HC Košice
- Runners-up: HK Poprad

Slovak Extraliga seasons
- 2009–10 2011–12

The 2010–11 Slovak Extraliga season was the 18th season of the Slovak Extraliga since its creation after the breakup of Czechoslovakia and the Czechoslovak First Ice Hockey League in 1993.

== Regular season ==
=== Standings ===
Po.	Club	GP	W	OTW/SOW	OTL/SOL	L	GF	GA	PTS
1.	HC Košice	57	38	10	3	6	217	102	137
2.	HK ŠKP Poprad	57	30	7	7	13	187	135	111
3.	HC ’05 Banská Bystrica	57	26	7	5	19	179	140	97
4.	HC Slovan Bratislava	57	25	5	5	22	169	144	90
5.	HK Dukla Trenčín	57	26	3	4	24	147	168	88
6.	HKm Zvolen	57	22	5	8	22	161	156	84
7.	HK 36 Skalica	57	21	6	4	26	158	168	79
8.	HK Nitra	57	21	4	6	26	168	189	77
9.	MHC Mountfield	57	21	1	9	26	153	182	74
10.	MsHK Žilina	57	14	6	1	36	127	186	55
11.	HK Orange 20	30	2	0	2	26	42	140	8

clinched playoff spot
will play in relegation series

Key - GP: Games played, W: Wins, OTW/SOW: Overtime/Shootout wins, OTL/SOL: Overtime/Shootout losses, L: Losses, GF: Goals for, GA: Goals against, PTS: Points.

=== Statistics ===
==== Scoring leaders ====
GP = Games played; G = Goals; A = Assists; Pts = Points; +/– = Plus/minus; PIM = Penalty minutes

Player	Team	GP	G	A	Pts	+/–	PIM
(Slovakia) Miroslav Zálešák	HK 36 Skalica / HC Košice	58	28	36	64	+14	92
(Slovakia) Arne Kroták	HK Poprad	52	20	38	58	+35	46
(Slovakia) Miroslav Štefanka	HK Nitra	56	17	39	56	+11	34
(Slovakia) Peter Bartoš	HC Košice	57	23	30	53	+36	32
(Slovakia) René Školiak	HK 36 Skalica	47	18	33	51	+9	113
(Slovakia) Michal Hudec	HC ’05 Banská Bystrica	49	18	31	49	+32	83
(Slovakia) Roman Tománek	HC ’05 Banská Bystrica	48	29	18	47	+38	46
(Slovakia) Jaroslav Jabrocký	MHC Mountfield	51	27	20	47	+18	38
(Slovakia) Stanislav Gron	HC Košice	45	18	29	47	+34	8
(Czech Republic) Jaroslav Kristek	HC Košice	55	14	32	46	+43	38
(Slovakia) Ján Pardavý	HK Dukla Trenčín	53	14	32	46	+15	34

==== Leading goaltenders ====
These are the leaders in GAA among goaltenders that have played at least 1200 minutes.

GP = Games played; TOI = Time on ice (minutes); GA = Goals against; Sv% = Save percentage; GAA = Goals against average

Player	Team	GP	TOI	GA	Sv%	GAA
(Slovakia) Július Hudáček	HC Košice	45	2752:58	82	.936	1.79
(Slovakia) Marcel Melicherčík	HK Poprad	53	3014:48	110	.917	2.19
(Slovakia) Lukáš Škrečko	HKm Zvolen	48	2605:33	103	.929	2.37
(Slovakia) Branislav Konrád	HC Slovan Bratislava	35	1998:14	79	.929	2.37
(Slovakia) Miroslav Šimonovič	HC ’05 Banská Bystrica	43	2553:07	110	.919	2.59

== Playoffs ==
=== Playoff bracket ===
Quarterfinals
1	Košice	4
8	Nitra	1
4	Slovan Bratislava	3
5	Trenčín	4
2	Poprad	4
7	Skalica	2
3	Banská Bystrica	4
6	Zvolen	3

Semifinals
1	Košice	4
5	Trenčín	0
2	Poprad	4
3	Banská Bystrica	3

Final
1	Košice	4
2	Poprad	1

=== Quarterfinals ===
- Košice – Nitra 4–1 (4–3, 6–0, 3–2PS, 1–3, 5–0)
- Poprad – Skalica 4–2 (0–2, 2–1, 2–1, 0–1OT, 6–3, 1–0)
- Banská Bystrica – Zvolen 4–3 (3–5, 3–4, 3–0, 4–3PS, 1–2PS, 3–2PS, 2–1)
- Slovan – Trenčín 3–4 (4–2, 4–1, 6–3, 2–3PS, 1–2, 3–6, 2–5)

=== Semifinals ===
- Košice – Trenčín 4–0 (9–1, 5–0, 4–3PS, 5–1)
- Poprad – Banská Bystrica 4–3 (7–5, 1–3, 1–3, 3–2, 4–3OT, 1–2PS, 6–4)

=== Finals ===
- Košice – Poprad 4–1 (3–1, 3–0, 1–2OT, 6–1, 4–1)

=== Relegation round ===
- Žilina – Piešťany 4–0 (4–2, 4–2, 3–1, 3–1)

=== Playoff statistics ===
==== Playoff scoring leaders ====
Player	Team	GP	G	A	Pts	PIM
(Slovakia) Miroslav Zálešák	HC Košice	14	8	8	16	4
(Slovakia) Michel Miklík	HC Košice	14	8	6	14	14
(Slovakia) Martin Kuľha	HK Poprad	18	7	6	13	24
(Slovakia) Miroslav Lažo	HC ’05 Banská Bystrica	14	5	8	13	48
(Czech Republic) Jaroslav Kristek	HC Košice	14	5	8	13	22
(Slovakia) Radoslav Tybor	HK Dukla Trenčín	10	6	6	12	6
(Slovakia) Stanislav Gron	HC Košice	14	6	6	12	6
(Slovakia) Miroslav Škovira	HK Poprad	18	5	7	12	60
(Slovakia) Peter Fabuš	HC Košice	14	3	9	12	0
(Slovakia) Vladimír Dravecký	HC Košice	14	7	4	11	10
(Slovakia) Richard Jenčík	HC Košice	14	3	8	11	2

== 2010–11 All Star Team ==
Player	Post	Club
(Slovakia) Július Hudáček	G	Košice
(Slovakia) Ján Tabaček	D	Košice
(Slovakia) Radoslav Suchý	D	Poprad
(Slovakia) Arne Kroták	LW	Poprad
(Slovakia) Stanislav Gron	C	Košice
(Slovakia) Miroslav Zálešák	RW	Košice

== Final rankings ==
Gold medal	Košice
Silver medal	Poprad
Bronze medal	Banská Bystrica
4	Trenčín
5	Slovan Bratislava
6	Zvolen
7	Skalica
8	Nitra
9	Martin
10	Žilina
