= 2009–10 Slovak Extraliga season =

2009–10 Slovak Extraliga
- League: Slovak Extraliga
- Sport: Ice hockey
- Duration: September 11, 2009 – April 2010
- Teams: 13

Regular season
- Champions: HC Slovan Bratislava
- Top scorer: Martin Kuľha (Slovan Bratislava)
- Relegated to 1. Liga: MHk 32 Liptovský Mikuláš, HK Spišská Nová Ves

Playoffs

Finals
- Champions: HC Košice
- Runners-up: HC Slovan Bratislava

Slovak Extraliga seasons
- 2008–09 2010–11

The 2009–10 Slovak Extraliga season was the 17th season of the Slovak Extraliga since its creation after the breakup of Czechoslovakia and the Czechoslovak First Ice Hockey League in 1993.

== Regular season ==
=== Standings ===
Po.	Club	GP	W	OTW/SOW	OTL/SOL	L	GF	GA	+/−	PTS
1.	HC Slovan Bratislava	47	35	5	2	5	199	101	+98	117
2.	HC ’05 Banská Bystrica	47	24	10	4	9	179	133	+46	96
3.	HC Košice	47	24	3	3	17	179	126	+53	81
4.	MHC Martin	47	22	4	5	16	139	131	+8	79
5.	HK 36 Skalica	47	23	3	4	17	153	137	+16	79
6.	HK Poprad	47	24	0	5	18	155	132	+23	77
7.	HK Nitra	47	21	5	3	18	127	130	−3	76
8.	HKm Zvolen	47	20	3	5	19	132	126	+6	71
9.	HK Dukla Trenčín	47	17	3	4	23	159	167	−8	61
10.	MsHK Žilina	47	12	8	4	23	126	158	−32	56
11.	HK Spišská Nová Ves	47	13	2	5	27	125	168	−43	48
12.	MHk 32 Liptovský Mikuláš	47	12	2	5	28	129	185	−56	45
13.	HK Orange 20	36	4	1	0	31	70	178	−108	14

clinched playoff spot
will play in relegation series
relegated to the second division

Key - GP: Games played, W: Wins, OTW/SOW: Overtime/Shootout wins, OTL/SOL: Overtime/Shootout losses, L: Losses, GF: Goals for, GA: Goals against, PTS: Points.

=== Statistics ===
==== Scoring leaders ====
GP = Games played; G = Goals; A = Assists; Pts = Points; +/– = Plus/minus; PIM = Penalty minutes

Player	Team	GP	G	A	Pts	+/–	PIM
(Slovakia) Martin Kuľha	HC Slovan Bratislava	43	23	34	57	+45	40
(Slovakia) Peter Klouda	HK Poprad	46	17	40	57	+24	50
(Slovakia) Ján Pardavý	HC ’05 Banská Bystrica	45	27	28	55	+29	12
(Slovakia) Tomáš Bulík	HC ’05 Banská Bystrica	44	23	31	54	+30	34
(Slovakia) Ľubomír Vaic	HC Slovan Bratislava	46	15	39	54	+55	30
(Slovakia) Žigmund Pálffy	HK 36 Skalica	36	17	36	53	+38	28
(Slovakia) Richard Šechný	HK Poprad	46	17	34	51	+18	48
(Slovakia) Marek Bartánus	MHk 32 Liptovský Mikuláš	47	28	21	49	+6	30
(Slovakia) Rudolf Huna	HC Košice	47	24	25	49	+18	16
(Slovakia) Tomáš Chrenko	HK Nitra	46	15	34	49	+9	105
(Slovakia) Marek Uram	MHC Martin	46	14	35	49	+14	34

==== Leading goaltenders ====
These are the leaders in GAA among goaltenders that have played at least 1200 minutes.

GP = Games played; TOI = Time on ice (minutes); GA = Goals against; Sv% = Save percentage; GAA = Goals against average

Player	Team	GP	TOI	GA	Sv%	GAA
(Slovakia) Branislav Konrád	HC Slovan Bratislava	36	2169:20	73	.940	2.02
(Slovakia) Július Hudáček	HC Košice	27	1588:17	60	.934	2.27
(Slovakia) Michal Dzubina	MHC Martin	26	1324:27	54	.925	2.45
(Slovakia) Zdenko Kotvan	HK 36 Skalica	33	1759:29	73	.920	2.49
(Czech Republic) Vlastimil Lakosil	HK Nitra	35	1981:46	86	.910	2.60

== Playoffs ==
=== Playoff bracket ===
Quarterfinals
1	Slovan Bratislava	4
8	Zvolen	1
2	Banská Bystrica	2
7	Nitra	4
3	Košice	4
6	Poprad	1
4	Martin	4
5	Skalica	3

Semifinals
1	Slovan Bratislava	4
7	Nitra	0
3	Košice	4
4	Martin	1

Final
1	Slovan Bratislava	2
3	Košice	4

=== Quarterfinals ===
- Slovan – Zvolen 4–1 (8–2, 1–6, 4–1, 3–2PS, 3–2OT)
- Banská Bystrica – Nitra 2–4 (3–4PS, 2–1, 3–0, 1–4, 2–4, 3–4PS)
- Košice – Poprad 4–1 (1–0PS, 4–2, 2–4, 5–1, 8–1)
- Martin - Skalica 4–3 (2–6, 4–5PS, 7–3, 3–1, 1–3, 2–0, 4–3)

=== Semifinals ===
- Slovan – Nitra 4–0 (4–0, 5–3, 9–2, 5–2)
- Košice – Martin 4–1 (5–2, 5–3, 2–0, 1–2, 5–2)

=== Finals ===
- Slovan – Košice 2–4 (2–5, 3–6, 2–1PS, 2–3, 4–1, 2–5)

=== Relegation round ===
- Žilina – Piešťany 4–1 (4–0, 3–1, 3–2, 2–3PS, 3–1)

=== Playoff statistics ===
==== Playoff scoring leaders ====
Player	Team	GP	G	A	Pts	PIM
(Slovakia) Ľubomír Vaic	HC Slovan Bratislava	15	5	14	19	20
(Slovakia) Miroslav Lažo	HC Slovan Bratislava	15	8	8	16	34
(Slovakia) Vladimír Dravecký	HC Košice	16	7	7	14	2
(Slovakia) Martin Hujsa	HC Slovan Bratislava	15	2	12	14	16
(Slovakia) Peter Húževka	HC Košice	16	2	12	14	18

== Final rankings ==
Gold medal	Košice
Silver medal	Slovan Bratislava
Bronze medal	Martin
4	Nitra
5	Banská Bystrica
6	Skalica
7	Poprad
8	Zvolen
9	Trenčín
10	Žilina
11	Spišská Nová Ves
12	Liptovský Mikuláš
