= Martin Kulha =

Slovak ice hockey player

- Born: August 7, 1976 (age 48); Poprad, Czechoslovakia
- Height: 6 ft 2 in (188 cm)
- Weight: 194 lb (88 kg; 13 st 12 lb)
- Position: Left wing
- FFHG Division 1 team Former teams: Sangliers Arvernes de Clermont; HK SKP Poprad; HC Slovan Bratislava; HK 36 Skalica
- NHL draft: Undrafted
- Playing career: 2000–present

Martin Kulha (born August 7, 1976) is a Slovak professional ice hockey player who currently plays with Sangliers Arvernes de Clermont in the FFHG Division 1.

Kulha had previously played in the Slovak Extraliga with HK Poprad, HC Slovan Bratislava and HK 36 Skalica
