= 2005–06 Slovak Extraliga season =

- League: Slovak Extraliga
- Sport: Ice hockey
- Teams: 10

Regular season
- League Champion: HKm Nitra
- Runners-up: HC Košice

Playoffs

Finals
- Champions: MsHK Žilina
- Runners-up: HK Tatravagónka ŠKP Poprad

Slovak Extraliga seasons
- 2004–05 2006–07

The Slovak Extraliga 2005–06 was the thirteenth regular season of the Slovak Extraliga, the top level of professional ice hockey in Slovakia.

== Regular season ==
=== Final standings ===
Po.	Club	GP	W	OTW	T	OTL	L	GF	GA	PTS
1.	HK Nitra	54	31	0	6	1	16	161	119	99
2.	HC Košice	54	27	3	5	1	18	157	115	92
3.	HKm Zvolen	54	25	5	3	1	20	158	158	88
4.	HC Dukla Trenčín	54	25	1	7	3	18	112	97	84
5.	HK Tatravagónka ŠKP Poprad	54	22	4	8	1	19	130	119	82
6.	MsHK Žilina	54	24	0	8	1	21	136	122	80
7.	HC Slovan Bratislava	54	22	3	4	1	24	140	143	76
8.	HK 36 Skalica	54	18	3	10	1	22	128	134	70
9.	MHk 32 Liptovský Mikuláš	54	12	0	8	3	31	105	174	44
10.	MHC Martin	54	12	0	7	6	29	119	165	43

Key - GP: Games played, W: Wins, OTW: Over time wins, T: Ties, OTL: Over time losses, L: Losses, GF: Goals for, GA: Goals against, PTS: Points.

== Playoffs ==
=== Playoff bracket ===
Quarterfinals
1.	HK Nitra	4
8.	HK 36 Skalica	3
3.	HKm Zvolen	0
6.	MsHK Žilina	4
2.	HC Košice	4
7.	HC Slovan	0
4.	Dukla Trenčín	0
5.	ŠKP Poprad	4

Semifinals
1.	HK Nitra	2
6.	MsHK Žilina	4
2.	HC Košice	0
5.	ŠKP Poprad	4

Final
6.	MsHK Žilina	4
5.	ŠKP Poprad	3

== Playout ==
Extraliga Last Team	Score	1st. League Winner
MHC Martin	4:0	HC Topoľčany
MHC Martin	4:1, 2:1ps, 9:3, 5:2	HC Topoľčany

== Scoring Leaders ==
Regular season

#	Player	Club	GP	G	A	PTS
1.	(Slovakia) Erik Weissmann	Zvolen	52	30	29	59
2.	(Slovakia) Richard Šechný	Zvolen	51	14	37	51
3.	(Slovakia) Ľubomír Kolník	Nitra	54	28	20	48
4.	(Slovakia) Martin Hujsa	Slovan	40	25	22	47
5.	(Slovakia) Daniel Babka	Zvolen	54	11	35	46

Key - GP: Games played, G: Goals, A: Assists, PTS: Points.

Play-off

#	Player	Club	GP	G	A	PTS
1.	(Slovakia) Arne Kroták	Poprad	15	13	6	19
2.	(Slovakia) Michal Hreus	Žilina	17	7	8	15
2.	(Slovakia) Miroslav Škovira	Poprad	14	6	9	15
4.	(Czech Republic) Václav Král	Žilina	17	11	3	14
5.	(Slovakia) Gabriel Špilár	Žilina	17	5	8	13

== 2005-06 All Star Team ==
Player	Post	Club
(Slovakia) Miroslav Lipovský	G	Žilina
(Slovakia) Peter Podhradský	D	Košice
(Slovakia) Dušan Milo	D	Nitra
(Slovakia) Miroslav Kováčik	LW	Nitra
(Slovakia) Andrej Kollár	C	Nitra
(Slovakia) Arne Kroták	RW	Poprad

== Final rankings ==
Gold medal	Žilina
Silver medal	Poprad
Bronze medal	Nitra
4	Košice
5	Zvolen
6	Trenčín
7	Slovan Bratislava
8	Skalica
9	Liptovský Mikuláš
10	Martin
