= Miroslav Škovira =

Slovak ice hockey player

- Born: 7 November 1973 (age 52) Levice, Czechoslovakia
- Height: 5 ft 9 in (175 cm)
- Weight: 190 lb (86 kg; 13 st 8 lb)
- Position: Left wing
- Shot: Right
- Played for: HK Poprad; HC Třinec; HC Košice; MHK Kežmarok; MsHK Žilina
- NHL draft: Undrafted
- Playing career: 1991–2017

Miroslav Škovira (born 7 November 1973) is a Slovak former professional ice hockey player who played in the Slovak Extraliga and Czech Extraliga (ELH).
