= 2008–09 Slovak Extraliga season =

- League: Slovak Extraliga
- Sport: Ice hockey
- Duration: September 2008 – April 2009

Regular season
- League Champion: HC Košice
- Runners-up: HC Slovan Bratislava
- Top scorer: Žigmund Pálffy (Skalica)

Playoffs
- Finals champions: HC Košice
- Runners-up: HK 36 Skalica

Slovak Extraliga seasons
- ← 2007–08 2009–10 →

The 2008–09 Slovak Extraliga season was the 16th season of the Slovak Extraliga, the top level of ice hockey in Slovakia. 13 teams participated in the league, and HC Kosice won the championship.

== Standings ==
=== First round ===
Pl.	Team	GP	W	OTW	OTL	L	GF–GA	Pkt.
1.	HC Košice	46	30	5	1	10	191:103	101
2.	HC Slovan Bratislava	46	25	10	2	9	177:117	97
3.	HKm Zvolen	46	25	2	5	14	153:125	84
4.	MHk 32 Liptovský Mikuláš	46	23	4	3	16	149:134	80
5.	HK 36 Skalica	46	22	5	3	16	156:137	79
6.	Dukla Trenčín	46	21	5	4	16	132:118	77
7.	MHC Martin	46	20	3	8	15	155:141	74
8.	HC 05 Banská Bystrica	46	20	5	3	18	150:138	73
9.	HK Ardo Nitra	46	18	1	5	22	127:163	61
10.	HK Aquacity ŠKP Poprad	46	14	4	2	26	105:132	52
11.	MsHK Žilina	46	12	3	6	25	126:163	48
12.	MHK SkiPark Kežmarok	46	7	0	5	34	107:199	26
13.	HK Orange 20	24	3	1	1	19	46:104	12

=== Group round ===
==== Championship round ====
Pl.	Team	GP	W	OTW	OTL	L	GF–GA	Pkt.
1.	HC Košice	56	37	6	3	10	232:131	126
2.	HC Slovan Bratislava	56	29	11	3	13	215:149	112
3.	HK 36 Skalica	56	27	8	3	18	200:168	100
4.	HKm Zvolen	56	29	2	5	20	182:152	96
5.	MHk 32 Liptovský Mikuláš	56	27	4	4	21	175:169	93
6.	Dukla Trenčín	56	22	5	5	24	154:165	81

==== Qualification ====
Pl.	Team	GP	W	OTW	OTL	L	GF–GA	Pkt.
7.	MHC Martin	58	27	4	9	18	204:170	98
8.	HC 05 Banská Bystrica	58	28	5	4	21	197:169	98
9.	MsHK Žilina	58	20	4	8	26	177:192	76
10.	HK Aquacity ŠKP Poprad	58	18	7	3	30	139:164	71
11.	HK Ardo Nitra	58	19	2	7	30	151:207	68
12.	MHK SkiPark Kežmarok	58	12	2	5	39	145:238	45
13.	HK Orange 20	36	4	1	2	29	71:168	16

== Playoffs ==
=== Quarterfinals ===
- HC Košice – HC 05 Banská Bystrica 4–1 (4–2, 5–3, 3–6, 2–1 SN, 4–0)
- HC Slovan Bratislava – MHC Martin 4–1 (3–0, 4–0, 4–1, 2–4, 10–3)
- HK 36 Skalica – Dukla Trenčín 4–0 (2–0, 3–1, 3–1, 3–2)
- HKm Zvolen – MHk 32 Liptovský Mikuláš 4–2 (1–2, 5–2, 1–2, 3–2 SN, 6–1, 2–0)

=== Semifinals ===
- HC Košice – HKm Zvolen 4–3 (2–1 P, 1–3, 1–4, 5–0, 3–1, 3–4, 8–2)
- HC Slovan Bratislava – HK 36 Skalica 3–4 (6–8, 4–1, 3–6, 6–3, 4–2, 1–3, 2–3 P)

=== Final ===
- HC Košice – HK 36 Skalica 4–2 (4–2, 3–1, 5–2, 2–8, 3–4 SN, 3–2 SN)

== Play-outs ==
Pl.	Team	GP	W	OTW	OTL	L	GF–GA	Pkt.
1.	MsHK Žilina	64	22	7	8	27	194:202	88
2.	HK Ardo Nitra	64	22	3	8	31	168:219	80
3.	HK Aquacity ŠKP Poprad	64	20	7	5	32	152:182	79
4.	MHK SkiPark Kežmarok	64	13	2	6	43	160:260	49

== Relegation ==
- HK Spišská Nová Ves – MHK SkiPark Kežmarok 4:1 (3:2, 1:0, 4:2, 2:5, 3:1)
- HK Aquacity ŠKP Poprad – ŠHK 37 Piešťany 4:0 (9:2, 6:2, 4:3, 2:1 OT)
