= 1992–93 Czechoslovak Extraliga season =

Czechoslovak ice hockey season

The 1992–93 Czechoslovak Extraliga season was the 50th season of the Czechoslovak Extraliga, the top level of ice hockey in Czechoslovakia. 14 teams participated in the league, and HC Sparta Prague won the championship.

This was the last season of the league due to the peaceful dissolution of Czechoslovakia midway through the season – which all Slovak and Czech teams played to completion. The 1993–94 hockey season would be the first for the newly founded Czech Extraliga and Slovak Extraliga.

== Regular season ==
Pl.	Team	GP	W	T	L	GF–GA	Pts
1.	HC Chemopetrol Litvínov	40	25	3	12	168:126	53
2.	HC Sparta Praha	40	22	9	9	150:108	53
3.	Dukla Trenčín	40	21	4	15	167:148	46
4.	HC Vítkovice	40	20	4	16	174:147	44
5.	Motor České Budějovice	40	18	8	14	142:122	44
6.	Poldi Kladno	40	21	1	18	135:142	43
7.	HC Košice	40	19	3	18	137:140	41
8.	AC ZPS Zlín	40	17	5	18	126:120	39
9.	HC Dukla Jihlava	40	17	4	19	137:143	38
10.	DS Olomouc	40	16	4	20	131:150	36
11.	ŠKP PS Poprad	40	16	3	21	124:149	35
12.	HC Pardubice	40	14	3	23	123:161	31
13.	HC Slovan Bratislava	40	12	7	21	115:145	31
14.	HC Škoda Plzeň	40	12	2	26	125:153	26

== Playoffs ==
=== Pre-Playoffs ===
- HC Košice – DS Olomouc 5:0 (1:0,1:0,3:0)
- HC Košice – DS Olomouc 4:3 (0:1,2:2,2:0)
- DS Olomouc – HC Košice 3:4 SO (1:0,2:0,0:3,0:0)
- AC ZPS Zlín – Dukla Jihlava 4:1 (3:1,0:0,1:0)
- AC ZPS Zlín – Dukla Jihlava 3:2 OT (1:1,0:1,1:0,1:0)
- Dukla Jihlava – AC ZPS Zlín 5:3 (1:0,1:1,3:2)
- Dukla Jihlava – AC ZPS Zlín 6:1 (2:1,1:0,3:0)
- AC ZPS Zlín – Dukla Jihlava 3:2 (1:1,0:1,2:0)
- Poldi Kladno – ŠKP PS Poprad 6:2 (0:0,2:2,4:0)
- Poldi Kladno – ŠKP PS Poprad 4:0 (1:0,1:0,2:0)
- ŠKP PS Poprad – Poldi Kladno 4:3 (0:1,1:1,3:1)
- ŠKP PS Poprad – Poldi Kladno 5:0 Forfait (3:0,2:1,-:-)
- Poldi Kladno – HC Poprad 5:0 Forfeit
- Motor České Budějovice – HC Pardubice 1:2 (1:1,0:1,0:0)
- Motor České Budějovice – HC Pardubice 3:5 (0:1,3:1,0:3)
- HC Pardubice – Motor České Budějovice 1:0 (0:0,0:0,1:0)

=== Quarterfinals ===
- HC Chemopetrol Litvínov – HC Pardubice 3:2 OT (0:1,1:1,1:0,1:0)
- HC Chemopetrol Litvínov – HC Pardubice 6:3 (2:1,1:1,3:1)
- HC Pardubice – HC Chemopetrol Litvínov 0:4 (0:3,0:0,0:1)
- HC Sparta Prag – AC ZPS Zlín 5:0 (1:0,2:0,2:0)
- HC Sparta Prag – AC ZPS Zlín 5:2 (1:0,1:1,3:1)
- AC ZPS Zlín – HC Sparta Prag 3:2 (0:1,1:0,2:1)
- AC ZPS Zlín – HC Sparta Prag 2:4 (1:1,1:3,0:0)
- Dukla Trenčín – HC Košice 5:1 (0:0,2:1,3:0)
- Dukla Trenčín – HC Košice 4:2 (2:1,1:1,1:0)
- HC Košice – Dukla Trenčín 2:4 (1:2,1:1,0:1)
- Vítkovice – Poldi Kladno 2:1 (0:1,0:0,2:0)
- HC Vítkovice – Poldi Kladno 5:4 (3:2,2:1,0:1)
- Poldi Kladno – HC Vítkovice 4:2 (1:0,0:1,3:1)
- Poldi Kladno – HC Vítkovice 3:0 (1:0,0:0,2:0)
- HC Vítkovice – Poldi Kladno 9:1 (2:1,6:0,1:0)

=== Semifinal ===
- HC Chemopetrol Litvínov – HC Vítkovice 2:6 (1:2,1:1,0:3)
- HC Chemopetrol Litvínov – HC Vítkovice 2:7 (1:4,0:0,1:3)
- HC Vítkovice – HC Chemopetrol Litvínov 7:8 OT (1:5,6:2,0:0,0:1)
- Vítkovice – HC Chemopetrol Litvínov 4:5 SO (1:1,1:1,2:2,0:0)
- HC Chemopetrol Litvínov – HC Vítkovice 2:3 (1:2,1:1,0:0)
- HC Sparta Prag – Dukla Trenčín 9:3 (2:1,5:1,2:1)
- HC Sparta Prag – Dukla Trenčín 4:3 (3:0,1:2,0:1)
- Dukla Trenčín – HC Sparta Prag 4:3 (3:0,0:0,1:3)
- Dukla Trenčín – HC Sparta Prag 4:1 (1:1,1:0,2:0)
- HC Sparta Prag – Dukla Trenčín 7:2 (1:0,3:1,3:1)

=== Final ===
- HC Sparta Prag – HC Vítkovice 5:3 (2:0,1:2,2:1)
- HC Sparta Prag – HC Vítkovice 1:2 OT (0:0,1:1,0:0,0:1)
- HC Vítkovice – HC Sparta Prag 4:5 (1:1,2:3,1:1)
- HC Vítkovice – HC Sparta Prag 4:5 (1:1,2:1,1:3)

=== 3rd place ===
- HC Dukla Trenčín – HC Chemopetrol Litvínov 4:3 (1:0,2:1,1:2)
- HC Chemopetrol Litvínov – HC Dukla Trenčín 4:3 (3:1,1:2,0:0)
- HC Chemopetrol Litvínov – HC Dukla Trenčín 3:4 (1:2,1:1,1:1)
