= 2004–05 Slovak Extraliga season =

Slovak ice hockey league season

The Slovak Extraliga 2004–05 was the twelfth regular season of the Slovak Extraliga, the top level of professional ice hockey in Slovakia. During the 2004–05 NHL lockout several Slovak players returned to their homeland, including Pavol Demitra, Marián Hossa, Marián Gáborík (all in HK Dukla Trenčín), Miroslav Šatan and Ľubomír Višňovský (both in HC Slovan Bratislava), Michal Handzuš, Richard Zedník and Vladimír Országh (all in HKm Zvolen), Ladislav Nagy and Martin Štrbák (both in HC Košice), and Žigmund Pálffy (in HK 36 Skalica).

== Regular season ==
=== Final standings ===
Po.	Club	GP	W	OTW	T	OTL	L	GF	GA	PTS
1.	HKm Zvolen	54	31	5	4	1	13	185	128	107
2.	HC Slovan Bratislava	54	34	0	5	2	13	184	115	107
3.	HC Dukla Trenčín	54	31	1	7	1	14	200	127	102
4.	HC Košice	54	29	1	6	2	16	156	124	95
5.	HK Nitra	54	26	1	7	2	18	152	146	87
6.	MsHK Žilina	54	23	3	4	0	24	148	138	79
7.	HK Poprad	54	19	2	11	1	21	133	134	72
8.	MHk 32 Liptovský Mikuláš	54	18	1	8	1	26	139	166	64
9.	HK 36 Skalica	54	11	0	6	2	35	129	205	39
10.	HK Dubnica	54	4	0	2	2	46	93	236	14

Key - GP: Games played, W: Wins, OTW: Over time wins, T: Ties, OTL: Over time losses, L: Losses, GF: Goals for, GA: Goals against, PTS: Points.

== Playoffs ==
=== Playoff bracket ===
Quarterfinals
1.	HKm Zvolen	4
8.	MHk 32 Lipt. Mikuláš	1
4.	HC Košice	4
5.	HK Nitra	1
2.	HC Slovan	4
7.	HK Poprad	1
3.	Dukla Trenčín	4
6.	MsHK Žilina	1

Semifinals
1.	HKm Zvolen	4
4.	HC Košice	1
2.	HC Slovan	4
3.	Dukla Trenčín	3

Final
1.	HKm Zvolen	3
2.	HC Slovan	4

== Playout ==
Extraliga Last Team	Score	1st. League Winner
HK Dubnica*	4:2	HC Topoľčany
HK Dubnica*	7:1, 2:4, 1:2, 3:0, 8:0, 7:1	HC Topoľčany

* Dubnica sold license for the 2005-06 season to Martin due to financial troubles.

== Scoring Leaders ==
Regular season

#	Player	Club	GP	G	A	PTS
1.	(Slovakia) Pavol Demitra	Trenčín	54	28	54	82
2.	(Slovakia) Jaroslav Kmiť	Košice	53	23	33	56
3.	(Slovakia) Richard Kapuš	Slovan	52	17	37	54
4.	(Slovakia) Marián Gáborík	Trenčín	29	25	27	52
5.	(Slovakia) Arne Kroták	Košice	51	26	25	51

Key - GP: Games played, G: Goals, A: Assists, PTS: Points.

Play-off

#	Player	Club	GP	G	A	PTS
1.	(Slovakia) Miroslav Šatan	Slovan	18	15	7	22
2.	(Slovakia) Zdeno Cíger	Slovan	19	6	15	21
3.	(Slovakia) Richard Zedník	Zvolen	17	9	10	19
4.	(Slovakia) Marián Gáborík	Trenčín	12	8	9	17
4.	(Slovakia) Pavol Demitra	Trenčín	12	4	13	17

== 2004-05 All Star Team ==
Player	Post	Club
(Slovakia) Karol Križan	G	Zvolen
(Slovakia) Ľubomír Višňovský	D	Slovan
(Slovakia) René Vydarený	D	Slovan
(Slovakia) Miroslav Šatan	LW	Slovan
(Slovakia) Michal Handzuš	C	Zvolen
(Slovakia) Pavol Demitra	RW	Trenčín

Coach	Club
(Czech Republic) Miloš Říha	Slovan
