= 1994–95 Slovak Extraliga season =

- League: Slovak Extraliga
- Sport: Ice hockey
- Games: 36
- Teams: 10

Regular season
- League Champion: Dukla Trenčín
- Runners-up: HC Košice

Playoffs
- Finals champions: HC Košice
- Runners-up: Dukla Trenčín

Slovak Extraliga seasons
- 1993–94 1995–96

The 1994–95 Slovak Extraliga season was the second season of the Slovak Extraliga, the top level of ice hockey in Slovakia. 10 teams participated in the league, and HC Kosice won the championship.

== Standings ==
	Team	GP	Pts	W	T	L	GF:GA	Diff.
1	Dukla Trenčín	36	86	27	5	4	188:82	+106
2	HC Košice	36	83	26	5	5	188:96	+92
3	Slovan Bratislava	36	71	23	2	11	167:117	+50
4	ŠKP PS Poprad	36	61	19	4	13	128:106	+22
5	HK 32 Liptovský Mikuláš	36	46	14	4	18	107:130	-23
6	Martimex ZŤS Martin	36	42	12	6	18	94:110	-16
7	ZPA Prešov	36	38	9	11	16	92:131	-39
8	Spartak Dubnica nad Váhom	36	31	9	4	23	83:153	-70
9	HC Nitra	36	30	8	6	22	87:147	-60
10	HK Spišská Nová Ves	36	28	7	5	24	83:145	-62

== Playoffs ==
=== Quarterfinals ===
- Dukla Trenčín - Spartak Dubnica nad Váhom 3:0 (11:3,3:2,4:2)
- HC Košice - ZPA Prešov 3:0 (10:1,4:3,6:1)
- Slovan Bratislava - Martimex ZŤS Martin 3:0 (5:1,5:2,2:0)
- ŠKP PS Poprad - HK 32 Liptovský Mikuláš 3:0 (8:5,4:1,4:3)

=== Semifinals ===
- Dukla Trenčín - ŠKP PS Poprad 3:0 (9:5,5:3,5:3)
- HC Košice - Slovan Bratislava 3:0 (11:1,8:1,3:1)

=== 3rd place ===
- Slovan Bratislava - ŠKP PS Poprad 2:1 (4:3,5:6,5:2)

=== Final ===
- Dukla Trenčín - HC Košice 0:3 (2:4,3:5,1:7)
