= 1995–96 Slovak Extraliga season =

- League: Slovak Extraliga
- Sport: Ice hockey
- Games: 36
- Teams: 10

Regular season
- League Champion: HC Košice
- Runners-up: Dukla Trenčín

Playoffs
- Finals champions: HC Košice
- Runners-up: Dukla Trenčín

Slovak Extraliga seasons
- 1994–95 1996–97

The 1995–96 Slovak Extraliga season was the third season of the Slovak Extraliga, the top level of ice hockey in Slovakia. 10 teams participated in the league, and HC Kosice won the championship.

== Standings ==
	Team	GP	Pts	W	T	L	GF:GA	Diff.
1	HC Košice	36	55	25	5	6	173:88	+85
2	Dukla Trenčín	36	46	20	6	10	139:94	+45
3	Martimex ZŤS Martin	36	43	18	7	11	112:95	+17
4	ŠKP PS Poprad	36	41	18	5	13	127:98	+29
5	Slovan Bratislava	36	41	18	5	13	127:123	+4
6	HC Nitra	36	33	14	5	17	98:101	-3
7	Spartak Dubnica nad Váhom	36	31	12	7	17	96:121	-25
8	HK 32 Liptovský Mikuláš	36	29	12	5	19	111:130	-19
9	ŠK Iskra Banská Bystrica	36	24	9	6	21	80:124	-44
10	Dragon Prešov	36	17	7	3	26	75:164	-89

== Playoffs ==
=== Quarterfinals ===
- HC Košice - HK 32 Liptovský Mikuláš 3:1 (5:2,5:1,2:4,5:1)
- Dukla Trenčín - Spartak Dubnica nad Váhom 3:0 (2:1,8:1,5:4)
- Martimex ZŤS Martin - HC Nitra 3:1 (4:1,3:0,1:3,4:1)
- ŠKP PS Poprad - Slovan Bratislava 1:3 (3:4 OT,3:4,6:5 OT,1:5)

=== Semifinals ===
- HC Košice - Slovan Bratislava 4:1 (3:0,3:2 OT,4:6,8:2,5:4)
- Dukla Trenčín - Martimex ZŤS Martin 4:1 (2:1 OT,3:2,2:0,3:4 OT,5:3)

=== Classification ===
- ŠKP PS Poprad - HK 32 Liptovský Mikuláš 2:0 (7:3,7:4)
- HC Nitra - Spartak Dubnica nad Váhom 2:0 (3:2 OT.,6:2)

=== 7th place ===
- Spartak Dubnica nad Váhom - HK 32 Liptovský Mikuláš 0:2 (2:4,5:8)

=== 5th place ===
- ŠKP PS Poprad - HC Nitra 2:0 (8:5,4:2)

=== 3rd place ===
- Martimex ZŤS Martin - Slovan Bratislava 1:3 (5:6 OT,5:3,2:5,0:2)

=== Final ===
- HC Košice - Dukla Trenčín 4:1 (3:2 OT,4:1,5:4 OT,3:6,7:1)

== Relegation ==
	Team	GP	Pts	W	T	L	GF:GA	Diff.
1	HK Spišská Nová Ves	10	14	6	2	2	36:27	+9
2	ŠK Iskra Banská Bystrica	10	13	6	1	3	45:29	+16
3	HKm Zvolen	10	13	5	3	2	38:34	+4
4	Dragon Prešov	10	8	3	2	5	35:30	+5
5	MEZ VTJ Michalovce	10	7	3	1	6	29:43	-14
6	HK 36 Skalica	10	5	2	1	7	28:48	-20
