= 1996–97 Slovak Extraliga season =

- League: Slovak Extraliga
- Sport: Ice hockey
- Teams: 10

Regular season
- League Champion: Dukla Trenčín
- Runners-up: HC Košice

Playoffs
- Finals champions: Dukla Trenčín
- Runners-up: HC Košice

Slovak Extraliga seasons
- 1995–96 1997–98

The 1996–97 Slovak Extraliga season was the fourth season of the Slovak Extraliga, the top level of ice hockey in Slovakia. 10 teams participated in the league, and Dukla Trencin won the championship.

== Regular season ==
=== First round ===
	Team	GP	Pts	W	T	L	GF:GA	Diff.
1.	Dukla Trenčín	36	57	27	3	6	151:100	+51
2.	HC Košice	36	50	24	2	10	154:112	+42
3.	HC Slovan Bratislava	36	47	21	5	10	150:108	+42
4.	ŠKP PS Poprad	36	44	18	8	10	146:112	+34
5.	Martimex ZŤS Martin	36	44	19	6	11	111:92	+19
6.	HK 32 Liptovský Mikuláš	36	28	12	4	20	117:144	-27
7.	VTJ Spišská Nová Ves	36	28	12	4	20	111:140	-29
8.	Spartak Dubnica nad Váhom	36	24	9	6	21	116:161	-45
9.	MHC Nitra	36	20	8	4	24	106:143	-37
10.	ŠK Iskra Banská Bystrica	36	18	6	6	24	97:147	-50

=== Final round ===
	Team	GP	Pts	W	T	L	GF:GA	Diff.
1.	HC Košice	10	20	7	2	1	44:27	+17
2.	Dukla Trenčín	10	15	5	0	5	45:29	+16
3.	Martimex ZŤS Martin	10	14	6	1	3	36:37	-1
4.	ŠKP PS Poprad	10	13	5	1	4	36:39	
5.	HC Slovan Bratislava	10	11	4	0	6	42:34	+8
6.	HK 32 Liptovský Mikuláš	10	2	1	0	9	20:57	-37

=== Relegation ===
	Team	GP	Pts	W	T	L	GF:GA	Diff.
1.	MHC Nitra	14	19	8	3	3	54:42	+12
2.	HK 36 Skalica	14	18	7	4	3	44:37	+7
3.	VTJ Spišská Nová Ves	14	18	8	2	4	52:34	+18
4.	HKm Zvolen	14	18	8	2	4	52:34	+18
5.	ŠK Iskra Banská Bystrica	14	16	6	4	4	46:39	+7
6.	HC MEZ VTJ Michalovce	14	10	3	4	7	36:48	-12
7.	Spartak Dubnica nad Váhom	14	10	4	2	8	36:49	-13
8.	HK Dragon Prešov	14	3	0	3	11	27:64	-37

== Playoffs ==
=== Semifinals ===
- HC Košice - ŠKP PS Poprad 3:0 (6:3,5:2,3:2 OT)
- Dukla Trenčín - Martimex ZŤS Martin 3:0 (10:4,6:2,2:1)

=== 5th place ===
- Slovan Bratislava - HK 32 Liptovský Mikuláš 2:0 (7:2,7:5)

=== 3rd place ===
- Martimex ZŤS Martin-ŠKP PS Poprad 0:2 (0:2,3:4)

=== Final ===
- Dukla Trenčín - HC Košice 3:1 (5:3,1:5,5:2,6:1)
