= HK Poprad =

- Nickname: Kamzíci
- City: Poprad, Slovakia
- League: Slovak Extraliga
- Founded: 1935 (as "HC Tatry")
- Home arena: Poprad Ice Stadium (capacity 4,233) (Slovak: Zimný štadión mesta Poprad)
- Colours: Blue, royal blue, white
- Owner(s): (Richard Pichonský, chairman)
- General manager: Július Koval
- Head coach: Mike Pellegrims
- Captain: Adam Cracknell
- Website: www.hkpoprad.sk

HK Poprad is a professional ice hockey team in the Slovak Extraliga, the top ice hockey league in Slovakia. It plays its games in Poprad, Slovakia. The squad's greatest successes include 2nd place in the Slovak Extraliga in 2006, 2011 and 2021. The team finished in the standings of the 2023-2024 season in 1st place, with a record of 27 wins and 15 losses. The club is nicknamed Kamzíci, which means "Chamoises" in Slovak.

== History ==
HK Poprad, in its current incarnation, was founded in 1935 by the merger of two existing teams. Those teams were "SK Vysoke Tatry" (founded in 1926), and a team called "HC Poprad" (founded in 1929 as "Karpathenverein Poprad", name changed to "HC Poprad" in 1930). The 1935 merged team was named "HC Tatry". They started playing in the original SNHL, a 2nd-tier league, and eventually played as one of the strongest teams in various other 2nd-tier leagues. During this time, they went through various name changes, and won Slovak championships in 1970, 1981,1985, and 1991. The 1991 team, known at the time as "SKP PS Poprad", was admitted into the 1st-tier Extraliga of Czechoslovakia.

After the dissolution of Czechoslovakia in 1993, Poprad started playing in the new independent Slovak Championship which was named the Slovak Extraliga. The team underwent more minor name changes until 2010, and since that year, the official team name has been HK Poprad.

In the 1996–97 season Poprad was eliminated in the semifinals by HC Košice. In the next season 1997–98, they played semifinals again against HC Košice and lost 0–3. However, these two seasons were successful because the team won bronze medals. In the 2005–06 season the team reached the most remarkable success, but lost 3–4 in the final series against MsHK Žilina. This success was repeated in the 2010–11 season, when they played against the long-time rival HC Košice and lost 1–4 in the final.

== Season-by-season record ==
This is a partial list of the last tenth seasons completed by HK Poprad.

Note: GP = Games played, W = Wins, OTW = Overtime/shootout wins, OTL = Overtime/shootout losses, L = Losses, Pts = Points, GF = Goals for, GA = Goals against

Season	GP	W	OTW	OTL	L	Pts	GF	GA	Finish	Playoffs
2015–16	50	18	3	11	18	68	139	149	6th, Extraliga	Lost in Quarterfinals, 1–4 (HKM Zvolen)
2016–17	56	18	6	9	23	75	153	167	7th, Extraliga	Lost in Quarterfinals, 0–4 (HK Nitra)
2017–18	56	25	6	4	21	91	159	152	6th, Extraliga	Lost in Quarterfinals, 0–4 (HK Dukla Trenčín)
2018–19	57	28	9	3	17	102	168	147	5th, Extraliga	Lost in Semifinals, 2–4 (HC '05 Banská Bystrica)
2019–20	55	28	5	5	17	99	170	131	4th, Extraliga	Not held due to the coronavirus pandemic
2020–21	50	26	7	3	14	95	186	133	3rd, Extraliga	Lost in Finals, 1–4 (HKM Zvolen)
2021–22	50	17	7	6	20	71	165	161	6th, Extraliga	Lost in Quarterfinals, 3–4 (HK Nitra)
2022–23	50	17	9	3	21	72	151	153	7th, Extraliga	Lost in Wild card round, 0–3 (HK Nitra)
2023–24	50	27	5	3	15	94	163	119	1st, Extraliga	Lost in Quarterfinals, 2–4 (HK Nitra)
2024–25	54	24	4	6	20	86	178	144	6th, Extraliga	Lost in Quarterfinals, 2–4 (HK Nitra)

== Honours ==
=== Domestic ===
Slovak Extraliga

- (silver) Runners-up (3): 2005–06, 2010–11, 2020–21
- (bronze) 3rd place (2): 1996–97, 1997–98

Czechoslovak Extraliga

- (bronze) 3rd place (1): 1937–38

Slovak Hockey League

- (silver) Runners-up (1): 1941–42
- (bronze) 3rd place (2): 1942–43, 1943–44

1st. Slovak National Hockey League

- (gold) Winners (4): 1969–70, 1980–81, 1984–85, 1990–91
- (silver) Runners-up (4): 1966–67, 1979–80, 1981–82, 1987–88
- (bronze) 3rd place (6): 1968–69, 1970–71, 1977–78, 1978–79, 1982–83, 1985–86

=== Pre-season ===
Tatra Cup

- (gold) Winners (15): 1936/1937, 1937/1938, 1938/1939, 1941/1942, 1946/1947, 1995, 2000, 2001, 2005, 2012, 2014, 2018, 2020, 2023, 2025

== Players ==
=== Current roster ===
Source: hkpoprad.skSource: eliteprospects.comAs of 27 June 2025.

No.	Nat	Player	Pos	S/G	Age	Acquired	Birthplace
34	(Slovakia)	Filip Belányi	G	L	24	2023	Banská Bystrica, Slovakia
98	(Slovakia)	Peter Bjalončík	C	L	27	2024	Poprad, Slovakia
5	(Slovakia)	Martin Bodák	D	R	26	2025	Spišská Nová Ves, Slovakia
91	(Canada)	Andrew Calof	RW	R	34	2023	Ottawa, Ontario, Canada
27	(Canada)	Adam Cracknell (C)	RW	R	40	2024	Prince Albert, Saskatchewan, Canada
29	(Slovakia)	Samuel Fereta	D	L	27	2024	Humenné, Slovakia
59	(Slovakia)	Oldrich Kotvan (A)	D	L	35	2022	Skalica, Czechoslovakia
20	(Slovakia)	Peter Kundrik	C	L	27	2021	Poprad, Slovakia
36	(Slovakia)	Branislav Ligas	D	R	25	2024	Martin, Slovakia
87	(Slovakia)	Juraj Majdan	RW	L	34	2025	Dubnica nad Váhom, Czechoslovakia
49	(Slovakia)	Ľubomír Malina	D	L	34	2024	Kežmarok, Czechoslovakia
24	(Slovakia)	Aurel Nauš	RW	L	27	2024	Martin, Slovakia
7	(Slovakia)	Martin Nemčik	D	L	33	2025	Bratislava, Czechoslovakia
4	(Slovakia)	Ladislav Romančík	D	R	29	2024	Skalica, Slovakia
9	(Slovakia)	Juraj Šiška	RW	L	29	2024	Nitra, Slovakia
	(Slovakia)	Damian Slávik	G	L	20	2025	Nové Zámky, Slovakia
	(Slovakia)	Martin Sluka	D	L	20	2024	Považská Bystrica, Slovakia
18	(Slovakia)	Alex Šotek	RW	R	21	2023	Poprad, Slovakia
52	(Canada)	Ryan Sproul	D	R	33	2025	Mississauga, Ontario, Canada
25	(Slovakia)	Markus Suchý	C	L	21	2022	Scottsdale, Arizona, United States
26	(Slovakia)	Tomáš Török	LW	L	30	2024	Martin, Slovakia
23	(Slovakia)	Oliver Turan (A)	D	R	24	2023	Innsbruck, Austria
15	(Slovakia)	Jakub Urbánek	C	R	26	2023	Martin, Slovakia
30	(Hungary)	Ádám Vay	G	L	31	2023	Budapest, Hungary
94	(Slovakia)	Alex Výhonský	RW	L	31	2025	Košice, Slovakia

=== Retired numbers ===
HK Poprad retired numbers
No.	Player	Position	Career	No. retirement
13	Arne Kroták	LW	1990–2019	September 13, 2019

=== Franchise scoring leaders ===
These are the top-ten-point-scorers in franchise history. Figures are updated after each completed regular season.

- * – current Poprad player

Note: Pos = Position; GP = Games played; G = Goals; A = Assists; Pts = Points; P/G = Points per game

Points
Player	Pos	GP	G	A	Pts	P/G
Arne Kroták	LW	980	380	486	866	.88
Miroslav Škovira	LW	582	205	253	458	.79
Slavomír Pavličko	LW	564	143	278	421	.75
Peter Junas	LW	480	157	225	382	.80
Patrik Svitana	RW	509	137	243	380	.75
Peter Klouda	C	379	81	194	275	.73
Igor Rataj	RW	309	106	120	226	.73
Lukáš Hvila	LW	367	100	94	194	.53
Štefan Fabian	D	686	44	144	188	.27
Samuel Mlynarovič*	LW	371	85	99	184	.50

Goals
Player	Pos	G
Arne Kroták	LW	380
Miroslav Škovira	LW	205
Peter Junas	LW	157
Slavomír Pavličko	LW	143
Patrik Svitana	RW	137
Igor Rataj	RW	106
Lukáš Hvila	LW	100
Marcel Haščák	RW	95
Adam Lapšanský	LW	95
Martin Kuľha	RW	89

Assists
Player	Pos	A
Arne Kroták	LW	486
Slavomír Pavličko	LW	278
Miroslav Škovira	LW	253
Patrik Svitana	RW	243
Peter Junas	LW	225
Peter Klouda	C	194
Radoslav Suchý	D	147
Štefan Fabian	D	144
Igor Rataj	RW	120
Daniel Brejčák*	D	110

=== Franchise playoff scoring leaders ===
These are the top-ten playoff point-scorers in franchise playoff history. Figures are updated after each completed season.

- * – current Poprad player

Note: Pos = Position; GP = Games played; G = Goals; A = Assists; Pts = Points; P/G = Points per game; * = current Poprad player

Points
Player	Pos	GP	G	A	Pts	P/G
Arne Kroták	LW	102	41	31	72	–
Miroslav Škovira	LW	65	23	24	47	–
Patrik Svitana	RW	81	10	30	40	.49
Slavomír Pavličko	LW	43	11	19	30	.70
Marcel Haščák	RW	43	12	14	26	.60
Lukáš Hvila	LW	40	10	15	25	.63
Martin Kuľha	RW	34	14	10	24	.71
Dávid Skokan	C	24	10	12	22	.92
Radoslav Suchý	D	57	1	21	22	.39
Samuel Mlynarovič*	LW	51	9	12	21	.41

Goals
Player	Pos	G
Arne Kroták	LW	41
Miroslav Škovira	LW	23
Martin Kuľha	RW	14
Marcel Haščák	RW	12
Slavomír Pavličko	LW	11
Martin Frank	F	11
Patrik Svitana	RW	10
Lukáš Hvila	LW	10
Dávid Skokan	C	10
Samuel Mlynarovič*	LW	9

Assists
Player	Pos	A
Arne Kroták	LW	31
Patrik Svitana	RW	30
Miroslav Škovira	LW	24
Radoslav Suchý	D	21
Slavomír Pavličko	LW	19
Samuel Takáč	LW	17
Lukáš Hvila	LW	15
Marcel Haščák	RW	14
Jaroslav Kasík	D	13
Dávid Skokan	C	12

=== NHL alumni ===
- (Canada) Jamie Arniel (2022)
- (Slovakia) Ľuboš Bartečko (1993–1994, 2010, 2014–2015)
- (Slovakia) Peter Bondra (2004)
- (Slovakia) Michal Handzuš (1996)
- (Canada) Kevin Henderson (2016)
- (Slovakia) Miroslav Ihnačák (1992, 2004)
- (Canada) Brandon Mashinter (2021)
- (Slovakia) Ladislav Nagy (2010)
- (Slovakia) Andrej Nedorost (2011)
- (Slovakia) Radoslav Suchý (1994, 2004–2005, 2010–2016)
- (Slovakia) Tomáš Surový (2000)
- (Slovakia) Ľubomír Vaic (1993–1994, 2011–2013)
- (Canada) Kyle Wanvig (2010)
- (Kazakhstan) Viktor Svedberg (2024)
- (Canada) Adam Cracknell (2025)
- (Finland) Teemu Pulkkinen (2025)
- (Canada) Ben Thomas (2025)
- (Russia) Ivan Vishnevskiy (2021)

== See also ==
- Lev Poprad
- Tatra Cup
