= Marek (given name) =

Male given name

Marek is a West Slavic (Czech, Polish and Slovak) masculine given name, the equivalent of Mark in English. It is also the 46th most popular masculine given name in Estonian. Notable people bearing the name Marek include:

== Sports ==
Association football

- Marek Bakoš (born 1983), Slovak footballer
- Marek Bęben (born 1958), Polish goalkeeper
- Marek Čech (Slovak footballer) (born 1983), Slovak footballer
- Marek Čech (Czech footballer) (born 1976), Czech footballer
- Marek Heinz (born 1977), Czech football striker
- Marek Hamšík (born 1987), Slovak footballer
- Marek Hovorka (footballer) (born 1991), Czech footballer
- Marek Jankulovski (born 1977), Czech footballer
- Marek Kaljumäe (born 1991), Estonian footballer
- Marek Lemsalu (born 1972), Estonian footballer
- Marek Mintál (born 1977), Slovak footballer
- Marek Nikl (born 1976), Czech footballer
- Marek Saganowski (born 1978), Polish footballer
- Marek Szmid (born 1982), English footballer
- Marek Suchý (born 1988), Czech footballer
- Marek Zając (born 1973), Polish footballer
- Marek Zúbek (born 1975), Czech footballer

Ice hockey

- Marek Batkiewicz (born 1969), Polish ice hockey player
- Marek Černošek (born 1976), Czech ice hockey player
- Marek Cholewa (born 1963), Polish ice hockey player
- Marek Hovorka (ice hockey) (born 1984), Slovak ice hockey player
- Marek Langhamer (born 1994), Czech ice hockey player
- Marek Marušiak (born 1990), Slovak ice hockey player
- Marek Posmyk (born 1978), Czech ice hockey player
- Marek Stebnicki (born 1965), Polish ice hockey player
- Marek Svatoš (1982–2016), Slovak ice hockey player
- Marek Vanacker (born 2006), Canadian ice hockey player
- Marek Viedenský (born 1990), Slovak ice hockey player
- Marek Vorel (born 1977), Czech ice hockey player
- Marek Zachar (born 1998), Czech ice hockey player
- Marek Zagrapan (born 1986), Slovak ice hockey player
- Marek Židlický (born 1977), Czech ice hockey player

Other sports

- Marek Avamere (born 1970), Estonian rower
- Marek Bajan (born 1956), Polish pentathlete
- Marek Bílek (born 1973), Czech discus thrower
- Marek Cieślak (born 1950), Polish speedway rider and coach
- Marek Deska (born 1985), Polish-Canadian baseball player, pitcher and Leon's inventory
- Marek Daćko (born 1991), Polish handball player
- Marek Doronin (born 1983), Estonian basketball player
- Marek Galiński (cyclist) (1974–2014), Polish mountain biker and road racing cyclist
- Marek Garmulewicz (born 1968), Polish former wrestler
- Marek Gniewkowski (born 1965), Polish fencer
- Marek Gołąb (1940–2017), Polish weightlifter
- Marek Houston (born 2004), American baseball player
- Marek Jóźwik (born 1947), Polish hurdler
- Marek Kaleta (born 1961), Estonian javelin thrower
- Marek Karbarz (born 1950), Polish volleyball player
- Marek Kolbowicz (born 1971), Polish rower
- Marek Krawczyk (born 1976), Polish breaststroke swimmer
- Marek Maslanka, Polish slalom canoeist
- Marek Minařík (born 1993), Czech baseball pitcher
- Marek Niit (born 1972), Estonian sprinter
- Marek Noormets (born 1971), Estonian basketball player
- Marek Piotrowski (born 1964), Polish heavyweight kickboxer and boxer
- Marek Rutkiewicz (born 1981), Polish road racing cyclist
- Marek Sikora (ice hockey) (born 1986), Czech ice hockey player
- Marek Sitnik (born 1975), Polish Greco-Roman wrestler
- Marek Stępień (born 1964), Polish fencer
- Marek Švec (wrestler) (born 1973), Czech wrestler
- Marek Ulrich (born 1997), German swimmer
- Marek Uram (born 1974), Slovak ice hockey player
- Marek Witkowski (born 1974), Polish sprint canoer
- Marek Wrona (born 1966), Polish racing cyclist

== Others ==
- Marek Balt (born 1973), Polish politician, economist
- Marek Biliński (born 1953), Polish composer of electronic music
- Marek Beer (born 1988), Czech volleyball player.
- Marek Borowski (born 1946), Polish politician
- Marek Kac (1914–1984), Polish-American mathematician
- Marek Całka (born 1966), Polish civil servant and career diplomat
- Marek Jan Chodakiewicz (born 1962), Polish-American historian specializing in Central European history
- Marek Djordjevic (born 1969), Serbian automobile designer
- Marek Edelman (1919 or 1922–2009), Jewish-Polish political and social activist, cardiologist, and the longest living leader of the Warsaw Ghetto Uprising
- Marek Gazdzicki (born 1956), Polish nuclear physicist, the initiator and spokesperson of the NA61 Shine Experiment
- Marek Gatty-Kostyal (1886–1965), Polish chemist and pharmacist
- Marek Grechuta (1945–2006), Polish musician and songwriter
- Marek Halter (born 1936), Polish-French writer and activist
- Marek Hłasko (1934–1969), Polish author and screenwriter
- Marek Huberath (born 1954), Polish professor of physics
- Marek Jastrzębiec-Mosakowski (born 1962), Polish author
- Marek Jiras (born 1976), Czech slalom canoeist
- Marek Jürgenson (born 1977), Estonian politician
- Marek Kalbus (born 1969), German opera and concert singer
- Marek Kawa (born 1975), Polish politician
- Marek Kohn, British science writer on evolution, biology and society
- Marek Kondrat (born 1950), Polish actor and director
- Marek Kukula (born 1969), British astronomer
- Marek Larwood (born 1976), English comedian and actor
- Marek Łatas (born 1960), Polish politician
- Marek Napiórkowski (born 1969), Polish jazz guitarist and composer
- Marek Olędzki born (1951), Polish archaeologist
- Marek Opioła (born 1976), Polish politician
- Marek Oramus (born 1952), Polish science fiction writer
- Marek Pavelec (born 1989), Czech solo violinist
- Marek Marian Piątek (born 1954), Polish-born bishop in the Catholic Church
- Marek Potemski, French-Polish physicist
- Marek Reinaas (born 1971), Estonian entrepreneur and politician
- Marek Rosa (born 1979), Slovak video game producer and designer
- Marek Sanak (born 1958), Polish geneticist and molecular biologist, professor of medical sciences
- Marek Šindler (born 1992), Czech slalom canoeist
- Marek Sikora (actor) (1959-1996), Polish film actor and theatre director
- Marek Sikora (astronomer), Polish astronomer
- Marek Strandberg (born 1965), Estonian materials scientist, businessman, caricaturist and politician
- Marek Štryncl, Czech conductor, violoncellist, choirmaster and composer
- Marek Tamm (born 1973), Estonian historian and professor of cultural history
- Marek Trojanowicz (born 1944), Polish chemist, professor of chemical sciences
- Marek W. Urban, American professor, polymer and materials scientist
- Marek Wielgus (1950–1996), Polish sports activist, photographer, and Sejm deputy
- Marek Wolf (born 1957), Czech astronomer
- Marek Zalewski (archbishop) (born 1963), Polish prelate of the Catholic Church
- Marek Żukow-Karczewski (born 1961), Polish historian, journalist, and author
- Marek Żuławski (1908–1985), London-based Polish painter, graphic artist and art historian
- Marek Zvelebil (1952–2011), Czech-Dutch archaeologist and prehistorian

== See also ==
- Marek
