= 2007 IIHF European Champions Cup =

Tournament details
- Host country: Russia
- Venue: 1 (in 1 host city)
- Dates: January 11 - January 14
- Teams: 6

Tournament statistics
- Games played: 7
- Goals scored: 40 (5.71 per game)
- Attendance: 36,800 (5,257 per game)
- Scoring leader: (Russia) Alexei Morozov (10 points)

Awards
- MVP: (Russia) Alexei Morozov

The 2007 IIHF European Champions Cup was the third edition of IIHF European Champions Cup. It was held in Saint Petersburg at the Ice Palace arena, from January 11 to January 14. The champions of 2006 of the six strongest hockey nations of Europe participate: Ak Bars Kazan (RUS), Färjestads BK (SWE), MsHK Žilina (SVK), HPK (FIN), HC Sparta Praha (CZE), HC Lugano (SUI).

== Group A ==
- Ivan Hlinka Division

=== Results ===
All times local (CET/UTC +1)

January 11, 2007; 15:00	HPK (Finland)	7 – 0 (2 - 0, 3 - 0, 2 - 0)	(Slovakia) MsHK Žilina	Ice Palace; Attendance: 1,100

J.-P. Loikas 12:10; T. Mäkiaho 16:28; B. Tibbetts 29:50; J. Vihko 32:59; J. Vihko 39:26; V. Leino 41:34; T. Mäkiaho 46:36 / Goals

January 12, 2007; 15:00	MsHK Žilina (Slovakia)	4 – 2 (0 - 1, 2 - 1, 2 - 0)	(Czech Republic) HC Sparta Praha	Ice Palace; Attendance: 900

D. Kusovský 21:05; P. Frühauf 35:16; M. Straka 42:30; M. Hanzal 59:56 / Goals / P. Ton 3:20; M. Sivek 38:08

January 13, 2007; 15:00	HPK (Finland)	3 – 2 (1 - 1, 2 - 1, 0 - 0)	(Czech Republic) HC Sparta Praha	Ice Palace; Attendance: 4,200

J. Lahti 10:07; J. Vihko 21:52; T. Mäkiaho 32:48 / Goals / M. Černošek 18:26; J. Hanzlík 25:27

=== Standings ===
Pos	Team	Pld	W	OTW	OTL	L	GF	GA	GD	Pts
1	(Finland) HPK	2	2	0	0	0	10	2	+8	6
2	(Slovakia) MsHK Žilina	2	1	0	0	1	4	9	−5	3
3	(Czech Republic) HC Sparta Praha	2	0	0	0	2	4	7	−3	0

== Group B ==
- Alexander Ragulin Division

=== Results ===
All times local (CET/UTC +1)

January 11, 2007; 18:30	Ak Bars Kazan (Russia)	6 – 4 (2 - 2, 2 - 1, 2 - 1)	(Sweden) Färjestads BK	Ice Palace; Attendance: 6,400

S. Zinoviev 3:24; I. Nikulin 7:17; A. Morozov 34:06; I. Nikulin 34:38; D. Zaripov 53:18; D. Zaripov 59:54 / Goals / E. Kåberg 12:46; J. Höglund 17:32; E. Pirnes 23:31; P. Prestberg 43:53

January 12, 2007; 18:30	HC Lugano (Switzerland)	3 – 0 (1 - 0, 1 - 0, 1 - 0)	(Sweden) Färjestads BK	Ice Palace; Attendance: 1,300

S. Hirschi 13:53; S. Jeannin 29:21; R. Sannitz 59:14 / Goals

January 13, 2007; 18:30	Ak Bars Kazan (Russia)	3 – 0 (1 - 0, 1 - 0, 1 - 0)	(Switzerland) HC Lugano	Ice Palace; Attendance: 11,200

V. Proshkin 12:48; S. Zinoviev 23:33; S. Zinoviev 49:27 / Goals

=== Standings ===
Pos	Team	Pld	W	OTW	OTL	L	GF	GA	GD	Pts
1	(Russia) Ak Bars Kazan	2	2	0	0	0	9	4	+5	6
2	(Switzerland) HC Lugano	2	1	0	0	1	3	3	0	3
3	(Sweden) Färjestads BK	2	0	0	0	2	4	9	−5	0

== Gold medal game ==
January 14, 2007; 18:30	Ak Bars Kazan (Russia)	6 – 0 (3 - 0, 0 - 0, 3 - 0)	(Finland) HPK	Ice Palace; Attendance: 11,700

S. Zinoviev 8:21; D. Zaripov 11:49; A. Morozov 14:39; I. Nikulin 44:17; A. Pervyshin 47:22; I. Schadilov 49:01 / Goals

2007 IIHF European Champions Cup Winners
(Russia)
Ak Bars Kazan
First title
