= Footprints in the Sand (disambiguation) =

Footprints in the Sand is a common name for the poem Footprints.

Footprints in the Sand may also refer to:

== Printed media ==
- H_{2}O: Footprints in the Sand, a 2006 comic book
- Footprints in the Sand, a novel by Marek Jastrzębiec-Mosakowski

== Music ==
- Footprints in the Sand (album), a 1983 album by Cristy Lane, or the title track
- Footprints in the Sand, a 1994 album by Larry Norman
- "Footprints in the Sand" (Edgel Groves song), 1980
- "Footprints in the Sand" (Leona Lewis song), 2008
- "Footprints in the Sand", a smooth jazz recording by George Benson on the 1996 album That's Right

== Television ==
- Footprints in the Sand (TV series), Malaysian period drama
