= Hovorka =

Hovorka (feminine Hovorková) is a Czech and Slovak surname. Notable people with the surname include:

- David Hovorka (born 1993), Czech footballer
- Marek Hovorka (footballer) (born 1991), Czech footballer
- Marek Hovorka (ice hockey) (born 1984), Slovak ice hockey player
- Mikuláš Hovorka (born 2001), Czech ice hockey player
- Václav Hovorka (1931–1996), Czech footballer
