= Footsteps in the Sand =

Footsteps in the Sand may refer to:

- Footsteps in the Sand (film), 2010 Bulgarian film
- "Footprints" (poem), a poem

== See also ==
- Footprints in the Sand (disambiguation)
