= Marek Hovorka =

Marek Hovorka may refer to:

- Marek Hovorka (footballer) (born 1991), Czech association football player
- Marek Hovorka (ice hockey) (born 1984), Slovak ice hockey player
