= List of Florida Panthers players =

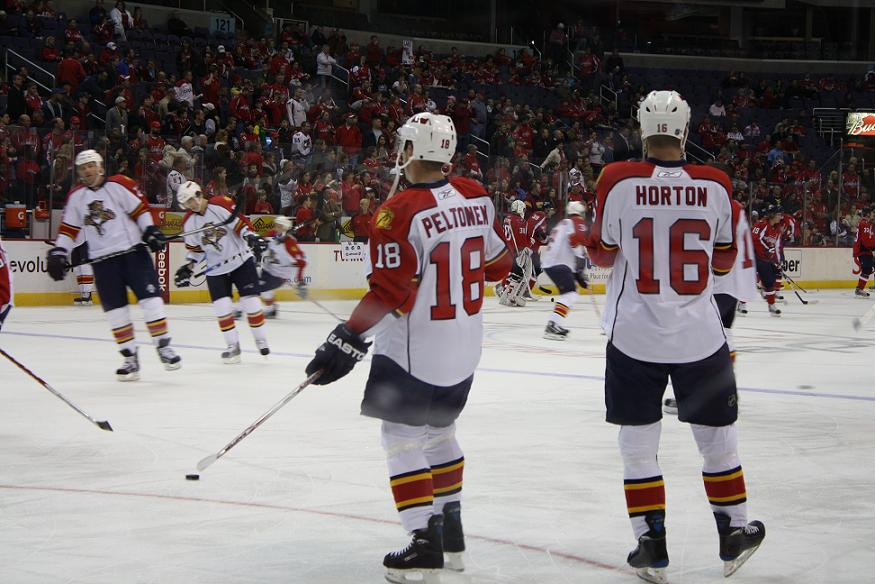
Ville Peltonen and Nathan Horton warm up before a game

The Florida Panthers are a professional ice hockey team based in Sunrise, Florida, United States. The Panthers are members of the Atlantic Division of the Eastern Conference in the National Hockey League (NHL). The team was founded as an expansion franchise on December 10, 1992.

By the end of the 2023–24 season, 39 goaltenders and 418 skaters (forwards and defensemen) have appeared in at least one regular-season game with the Panthers. In 2024, the Panthers had their most successful season, winning the Stanley Cup in their fifth consecutive playoff appearance; however, as the Panthers had previously made the playoffs only five times in their first 25 seasons, a comparatively low total of 11 goaltenders and 133 skaters have appeared in playoff games for Florida.

Six individual Panthers have received a major individual NHL trophy on nine occasions; Pavel Bure won the Maurice "Rocket" Richard Trophy twice, first after the 1999–2000 season and again the following season. Both Jonathan Huberdeau and Aaron Ekblad were awarded the Calder Memorial Trophy as the NHL's rookie of the year. Aleksander Barkov later won the Frank J. Selke Trophy twice, in 2020–21 and 2023–24. Additionally, Brian Campbell and Barkov have each won the Lady Byng Memorial Trophy, in 2011–12 and 2018–19, respectively, while Jaromir Jagr won the Bill Masterton Memorial Trophy in 2015–16. In 2008, Igor Larionov (2000–2001) was inducted into the Hockey Hall of Fame, becoming the first former Panther player to receive such an honor.

On October 24, 2007, Olli Jokinen scored two goals against the Philadelphia Flyers to become the franchise's then-all-time leader in both goals and points. Both marks were previously held by Scott Mellanby. Jokinen also became the all-time leader in assists, surpassing Robert Svehla. However, with the Panthers' struggles to make the playoffs, Jokinen never played a playoff game for the franchise. His records were later surpassed by Aleksander Barkov, who now serves as the franchise's active and all-time leader in games played, goals, assists, and points, as well as playoff assists and points; Carter Verhaeghe holds the playoff goals record. Paul Laus owns the record for most regular-season penalty minutes, while Matthew Tkachuk holds the playoff record.

The Panthers' all-time goaltender records are primarily held by two players. Roberto Luongo holds the franchise regular-season records for games played, wins, losses, ties, and shutouts. As a result of being the starting goaltender for the Panthers' repeated playoff appearances between 2020 and 2025, including their Stanley Cup victories in 2024 and 2025, Sergei Bobrovsky holds all of the Panthers playoff records, most by a wide margin.

== Key ==
- * Appeared in a Panthers game during the 2023–2024 season.
- † Hockey Hall of Famer, retired number, or Stanley Cup champion with the Panthers.

Abbreviations
GP	Games played
SC	Stanley Cup champion
Ret	Jersey number retired by team
HHOF	Elected to the Hockey Hall of Fame

Goaltenders
W	Wins
SO	Shutouts
L	Losses
GAA	Goals against average
T	Ties
OTL ^{a}	Overtime losses
SV%	Save percentage

Skaters
Pos	Position	RW	Right wing	A	Assists
D	Defenceman	C	Center	P	Points
LW	Left wing	G	Goals	PIM	Penalty minutes

The "Seasons" column lists the first year of the season of the player's first game and the last year of the season of the player's last game. For example, a player who played one game in the 2000–2001 season would be listed as playing with the team from 2000–2001, regardless of what calendar year the game occurred within.

Statistics complete as of the 2023–24 NHL season.

== Goaltenders ==
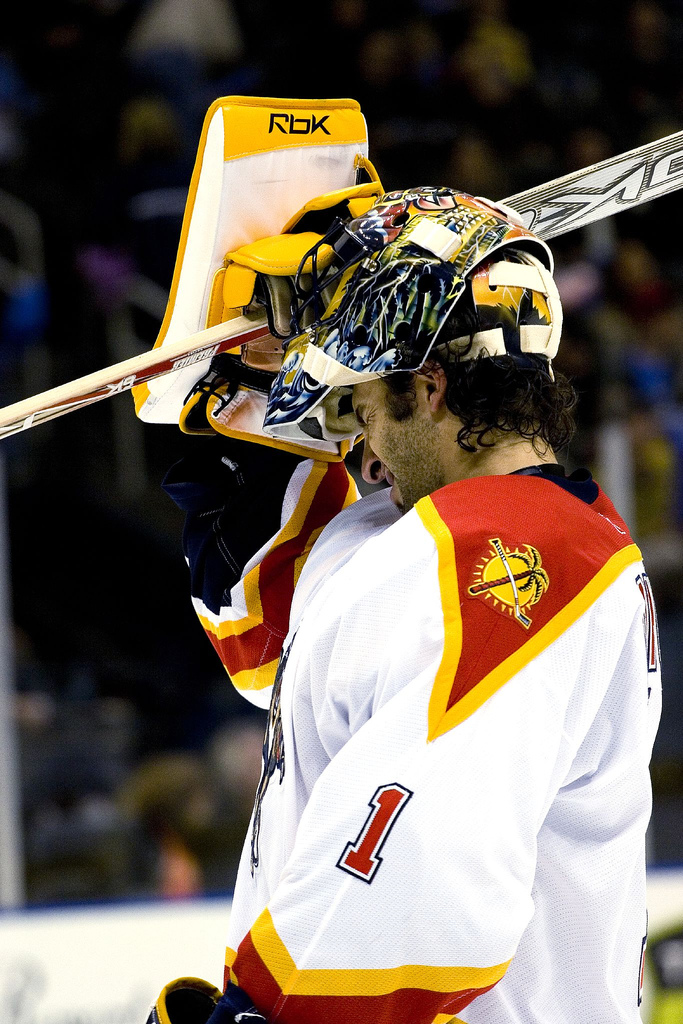
Roberto Luongo is Florida's career leader in games played, wins, losses, ties, and shutouts.

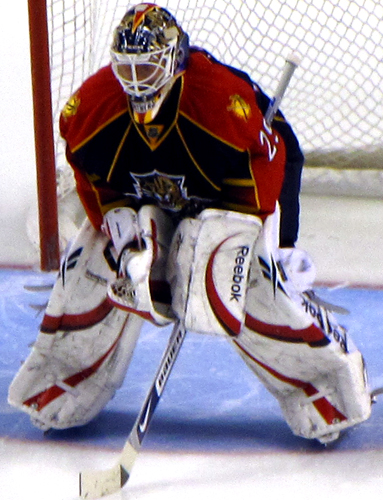
Tomas Vokoun played four season with the Panthers

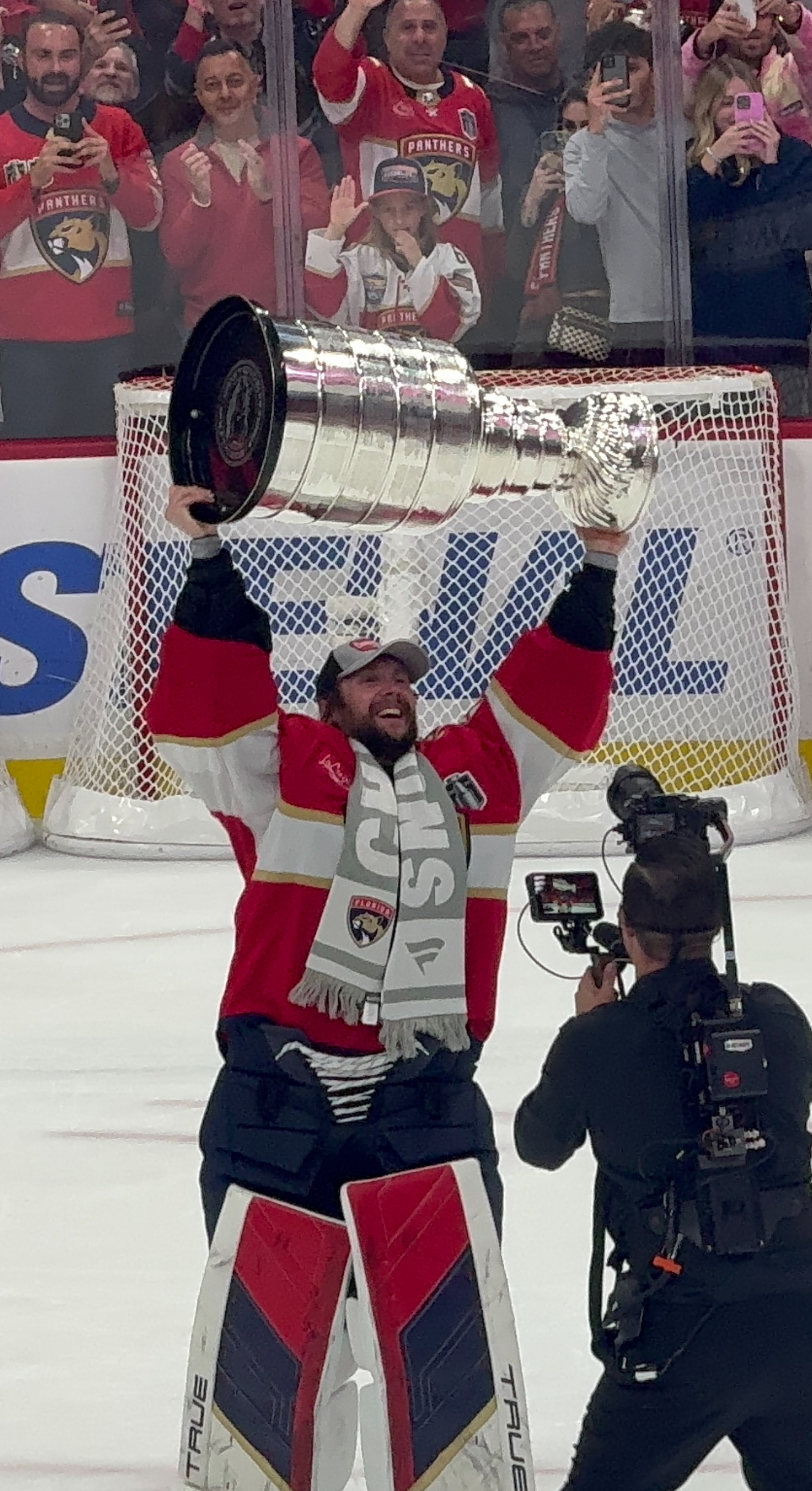
Sergei Bobrovsky was the starting goaltender for the Panthers' victory in the 2024 Stanley Cup Final, and holds the franchise playoff records for games played, wins, losses, and shutouts.

Name	Nationality	Seasons	GP	W	L	T	OTL	SO	GAA	SV%	GP	W	L	SO	GAA	SV%	Notes
Name	Nationality	Seasons	Regular-season								Playoffs						Notes
Anderson, Craig	United States	2006–2009	53	24	14	—	7	5	2.52	.928	—	—	—	—	—	—	
Auld, Alex	Canada	2006–2007	27	7	13	—	5	1	3.34	.888	—	—	—	—	—	—	
Belfour, Ed^{†}	Canada	2006–2007	58	27	17	—	10	1	2.77	.902	—	—	—	—	—	—	HHOF 2011
Bobrovsky, Sergei^{†}*	Russia	2019–2026	349	201	113	—	21	20	2.80	.903	83	50	32	6	2.44	.911	SC 2024, 2025
Burke, Sean	Canada	1998–2000	66	23	29	14	—	3	2.65	.908	—	—	—	—	—	—	
Clemmensen, Scott	United States	2009–2014	120	40	39	—	18	3	2.88	.905	3	1	2	0	2.34	.920	
Driedger, Chris	Canada	2019–2021	35	21	8	—	4	4	2.07	.931	3	0	1	0	3.70	.871	
Ellis, Dan	Canada	2013–2015	14	4	3	—	1	1	3.35	.881	—	—	—	—	—	—	
Fitzpatrick, Mark	Canada	1993–1998	119	43	42	22	—	3	2.71	.903	2	0	0	0	6.00	.800	
Flaherty, Wade	Canada	2001–2002	4	2	1	1	—	0	2.94	.919	—	—	—	—	—	—	
Foster, Brian	United States	2011–2012	1	0	0	—	0	0	0.00	1.000	—	—	—	—	—	—	
Hurme, Jani	Finland	2002–2003	28	4	11	6	—	1	2.88	.907	—	—	—	—	—	—	
Hutchinson, Michael	Canada	2018–2019	4	1	1	—	2	0	4.17	.839	—	—	—	—	—	—	
Johansson, Jonas	Sweden	2021–2022	2	0	2	—	0	0	7.74	.766	—	—	—	—	—	—	
Kidd, Trevor	Canada	1999–2002	103	28	50	13	—	3	3.09	.900	—	—	—	—	—	—	
Knight, Spencer	United States	2020–2025	80	44	25	—	7	5	2.76	.906	2	1	1	0	2.06	.933	2019 First-round draft pick
Luongo, Roberto^{†}	Canada	2000–2006; 2013–2019	572	230	241	32	57	38	2.61	.919	6	2	4	0	2.08	.934	HHOF 2022; Ret #1
Lyon, Alex	United States	2022–2023	15	9	4	—	2	1	2.89	.912	4	1	2	0	3.63	.888	
Markstrom, Jacob	Sweden	2010–2014	43	11	25	—	5	0	3.21	.898	—	—	—	—	—	—	
McLean, Kirk	Canada	1997–1999	37	13	12	5	—	2	2.85	.898	—	—	—	—	—	—	
McLennan, Jamie	Canada	2005–2006	17	2	4	—	2	0	3.01	.906	—	—	—	—	—	—	
Montembeault, Sam	Canada	2018–2020	25	9	8	—	3	0	3.20	.892	—	—	—	—	—	—	
Montoya, Al	United States	2014–2016	45	18	14	—	5	0	2.53	.908	—	—	—	—	—	—	
Niemi, Antti	Finland	2017–2018	2	0	1	—	0	0	5.08	.872	—	—	—	—	—	—	
Reddick, Eldon "Pokey"	Canada	1993–1994	2	0	1	0	—	0	6.00	.822	—	—	—	—	—	—	
Reimer, James	Canada	2016-2019	123	53	42	—	16	7	2.85	.912	—	—	—	—	—	—	
Salak, Alexander	Czech Republic	2009–2010	2	0	1	—	0	0	5.41	.850	—	—	—	—	—	—	
Sateri, Harri	Finland	2017–2018	9	4	4	—	0	0	2.92	.911	—	—	—	—	—	—	
Shields, Steve	Canada	2003–2004	16	3	6	1	—	0	3.44	.879	—	—	—	—	—	—	
Shtalenkov, Mikhail	Russia	1999–2000	15	8	4	2	—	0	2.31	.908	—	—	—	—	—	—	
Shulmistra, Richard	Canada	1999–2000	1	1	0	0	—	0	1.00	.952	—	—	—	—	—	—	
Stolarz, Anthony^{†}	United States	2023–2024	27	16	7	—	2	2	2.03	.925	1	0	0	0	5.17	.842	SC 2024
Tarasov, Daniil*	Russia	2025–2026	33	13	15	—	3	0	3.05	.895	—	—	—	—	—	—	
Theodore, Jose	Canada	2011–2013	68	26	22	—	14	3	2.63	.912	5	2	2	1	2.46	.918	
Thomas, Tim	United States	2013–2014	40	16	20	—	3	0	2.87	.909	—	—	—	—	—	—	
Vanbiesbrouck, John	United States	1993–1998	268	106	108	43	—	13	2.58	.912	27	13	14	2	2.28	.931	
Vaněček, Vítek^{†}	Czech Republic	2024–2025	7	2	4	—	1	1	3.00	.890	—	—	—	—	—	—	SC 2025
Vernon, Mike	Canada	1999–2000	34	18	13	2	—	1	2.47	.919	4	0	4	0	3.04	.912	HHOF 2023
Vokoun, Tomas	Czech Republic	2007–2011	248	101	108	—	30	23	2.57	.923	—	—	—	—	—	—	
Weekes, Kevin	Canada	1997–1998	11	0	5	1	—	0	3.96	.870	—	—	—	—	—	—	

== Skaters ==
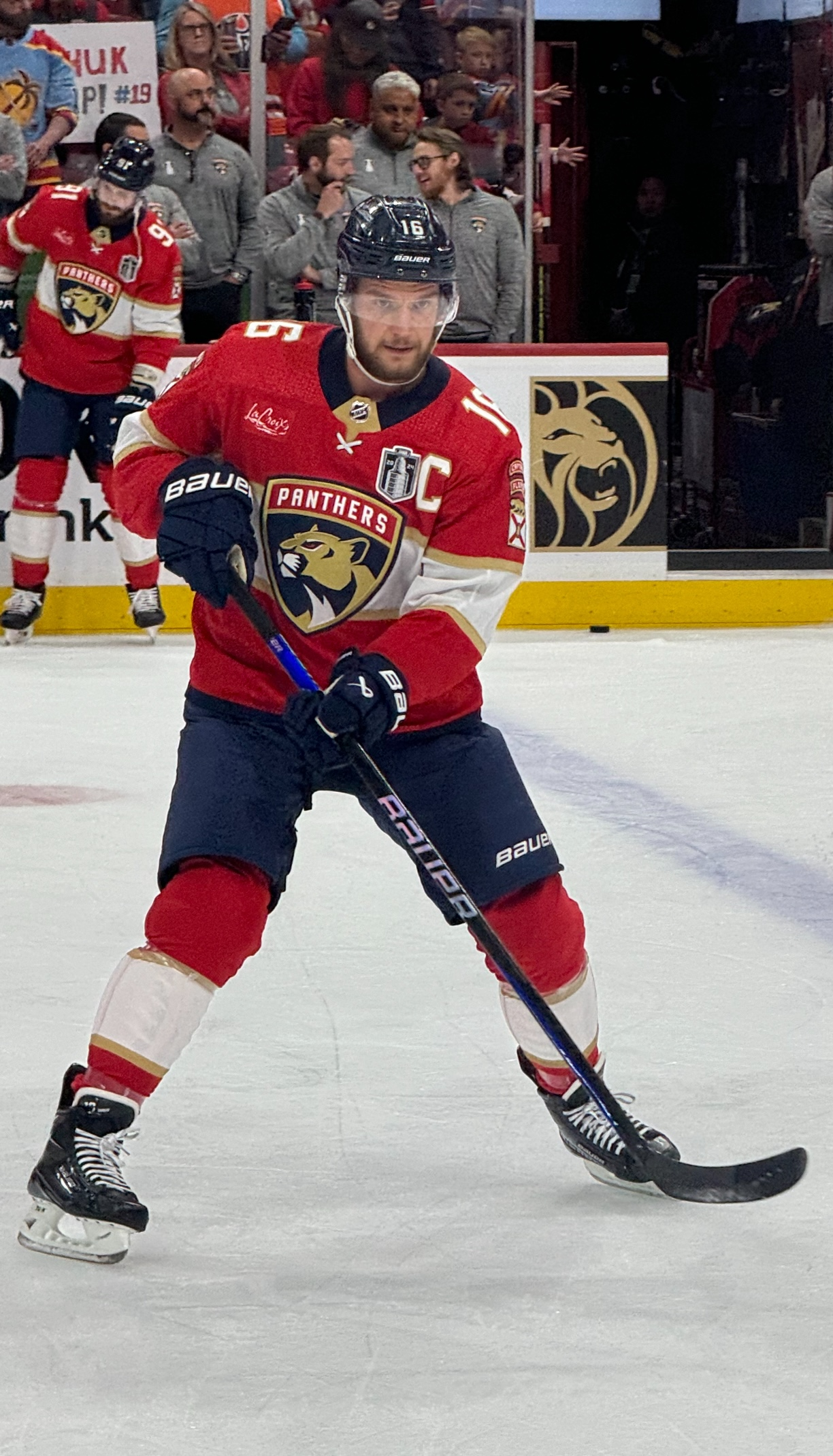
Aleksander Barkov has served as captain of the Panthers since 2018, including their victory in the 2024 Stanley Cup Final, and is the franchise's all-time leader in games played, goals, assists, and points.

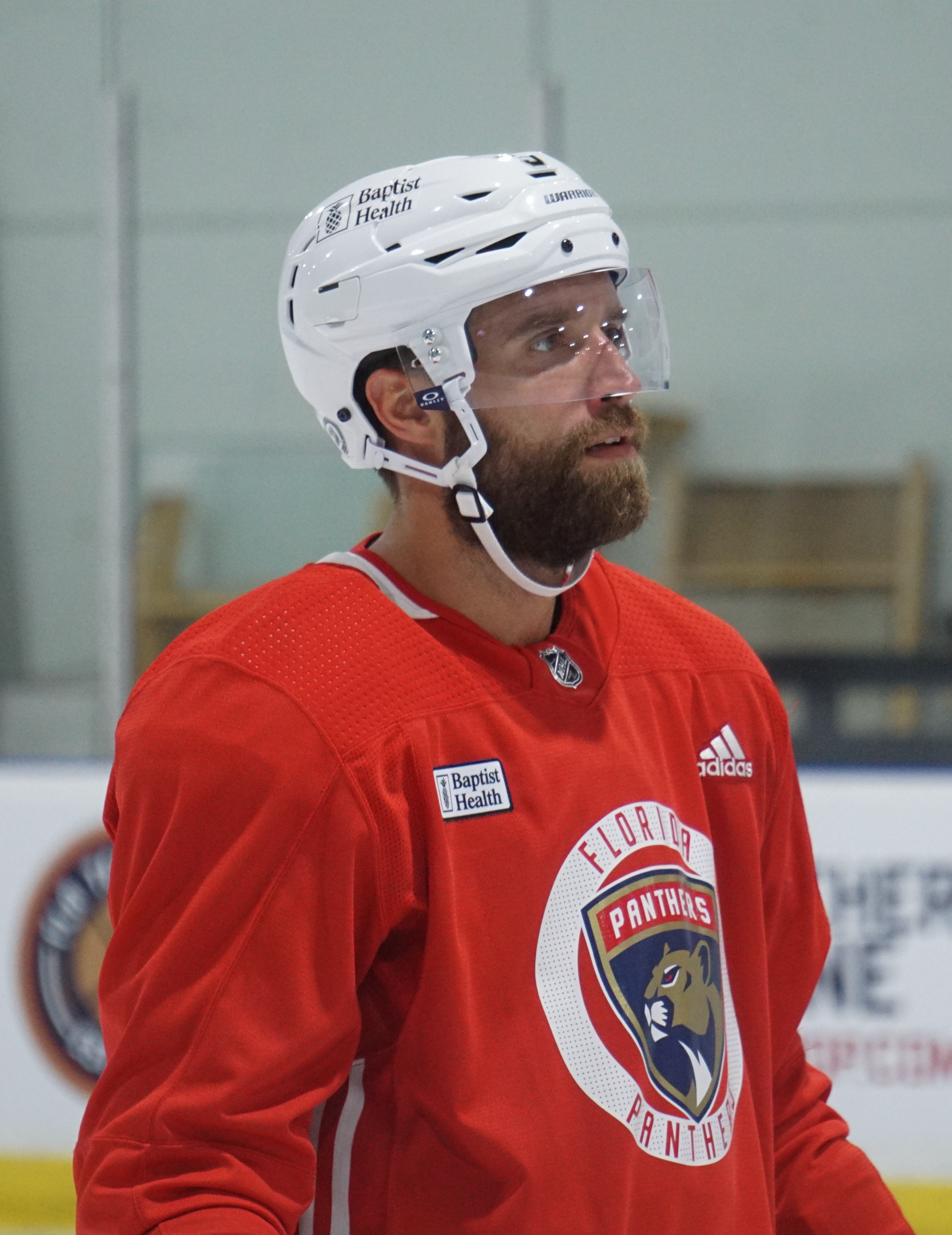
Aaron Ekblad was the first overall pick in the 2014 draft, and is Florida's all-time leader in games played, goals, assists, and points by a defenseman.

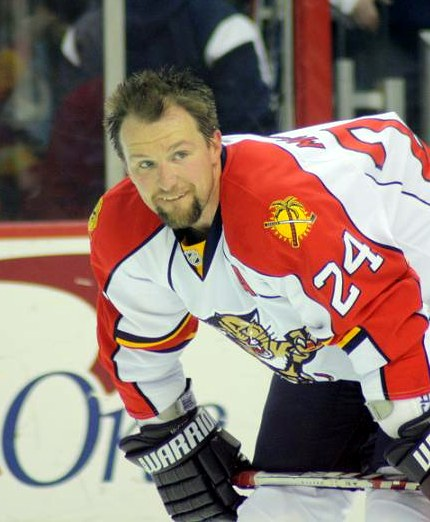
Bryan McCabe was captain of the Panthers from 2009 to 2011.

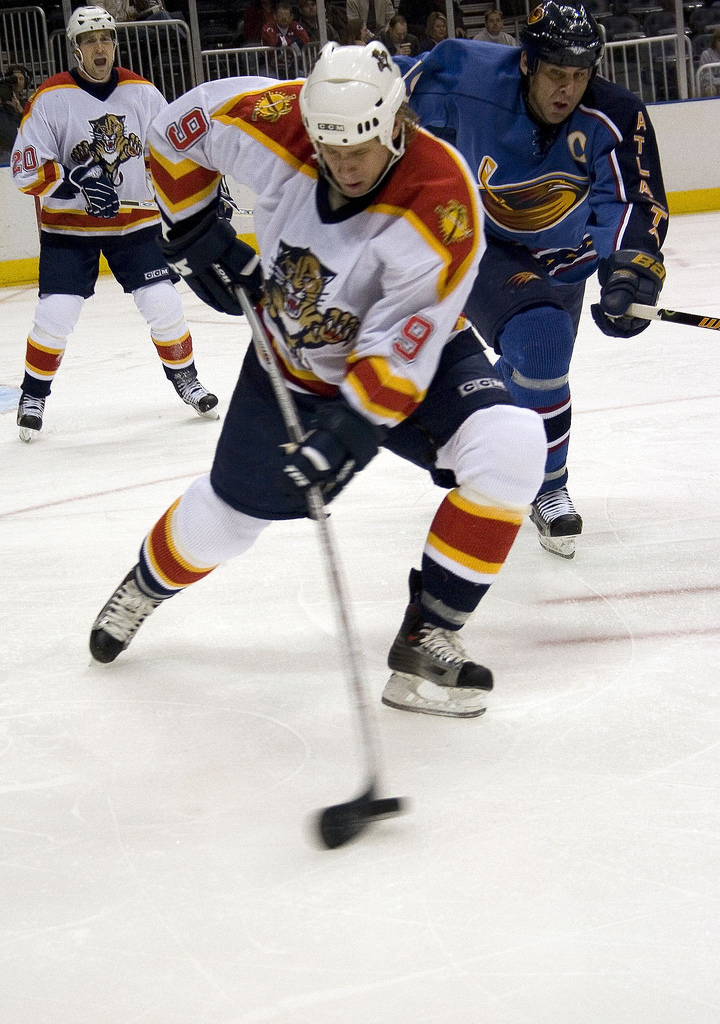
Stephen Weiss played his first 8 seasons in Florida.

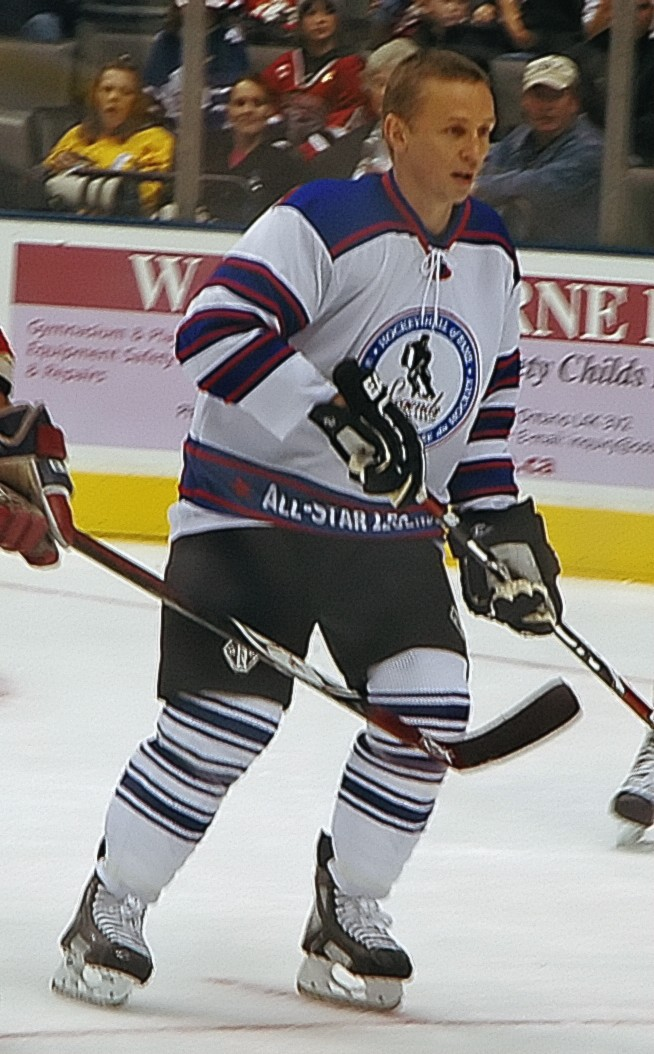
Igor Larionov, shown playing in the 2008 Legends Classic in Toronto, was the first former Panther player to be inducted into the HHOF.

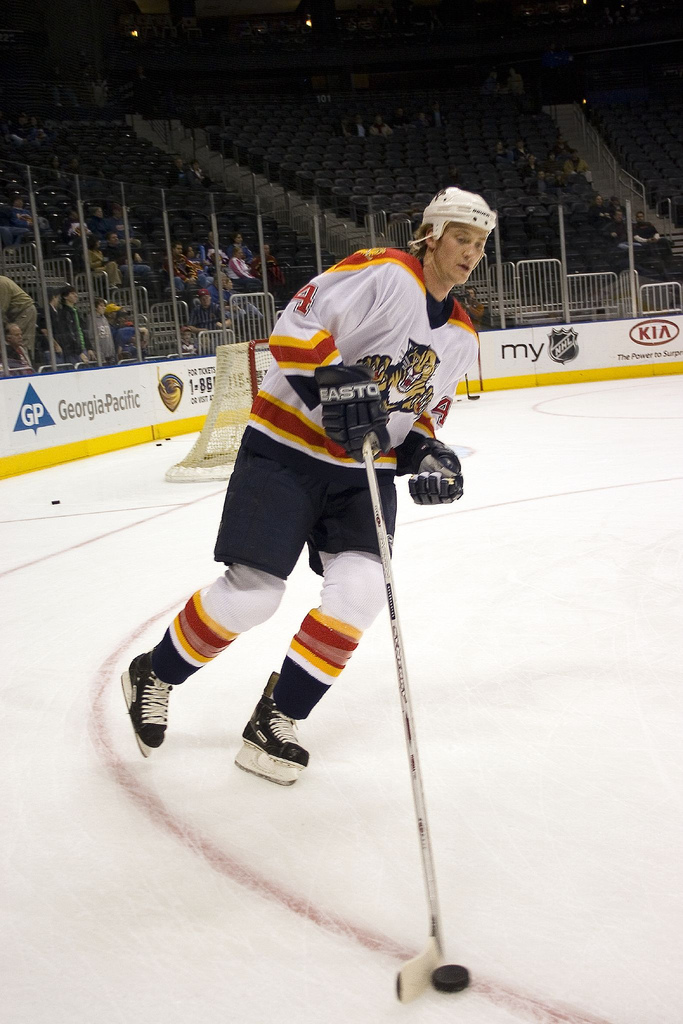
Jay Bouwmeester is fourth all-time in franchise history for assists and points by a defenseman

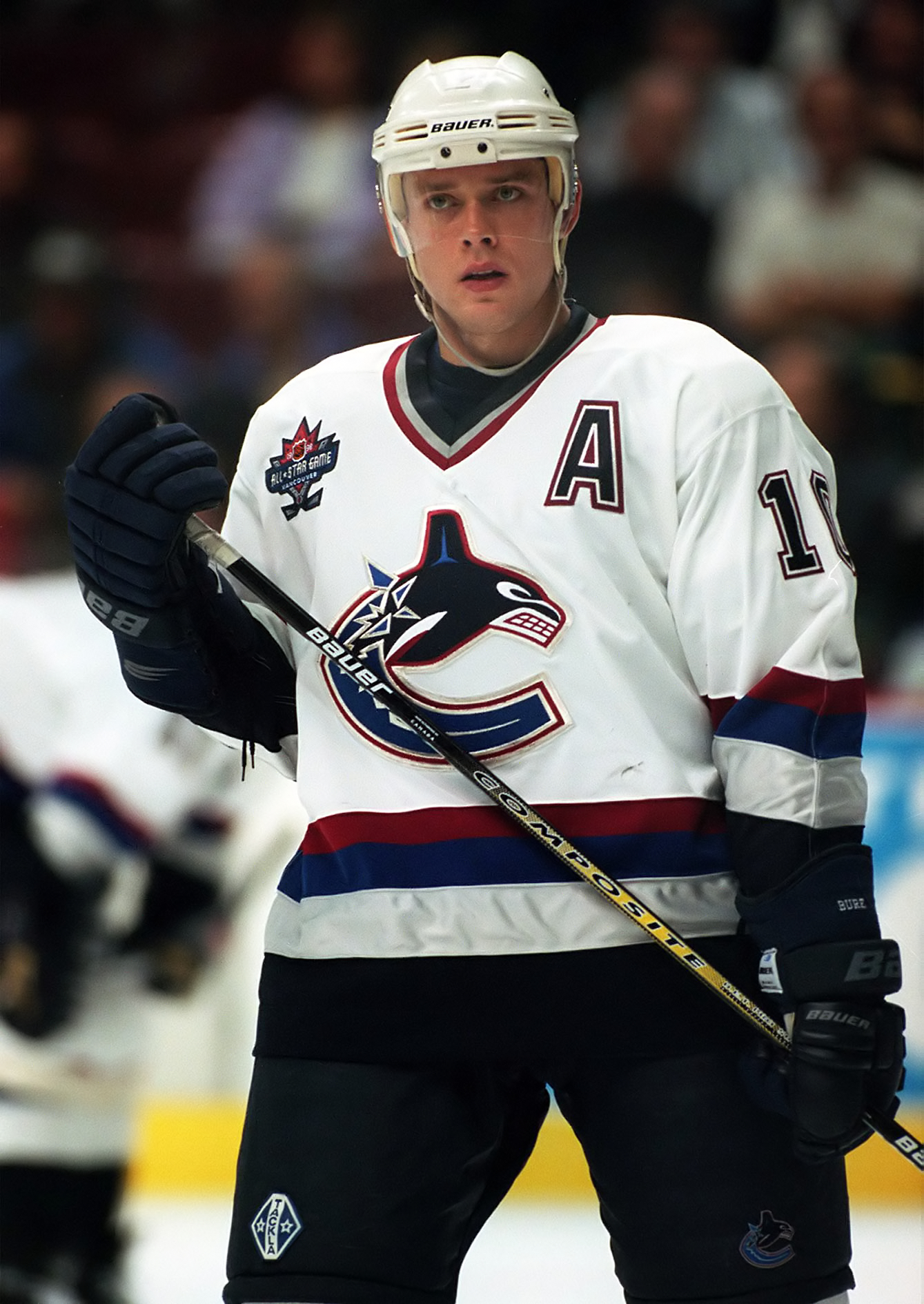
Pavel Bure, pictured with the Vancouver Canucks, won two Rocket Richard trophies during his time in Florida.

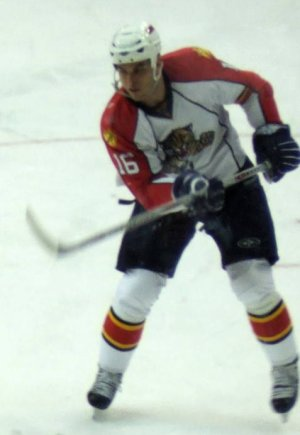
Nathan Horton registered 295 points for Florida in five seasons.

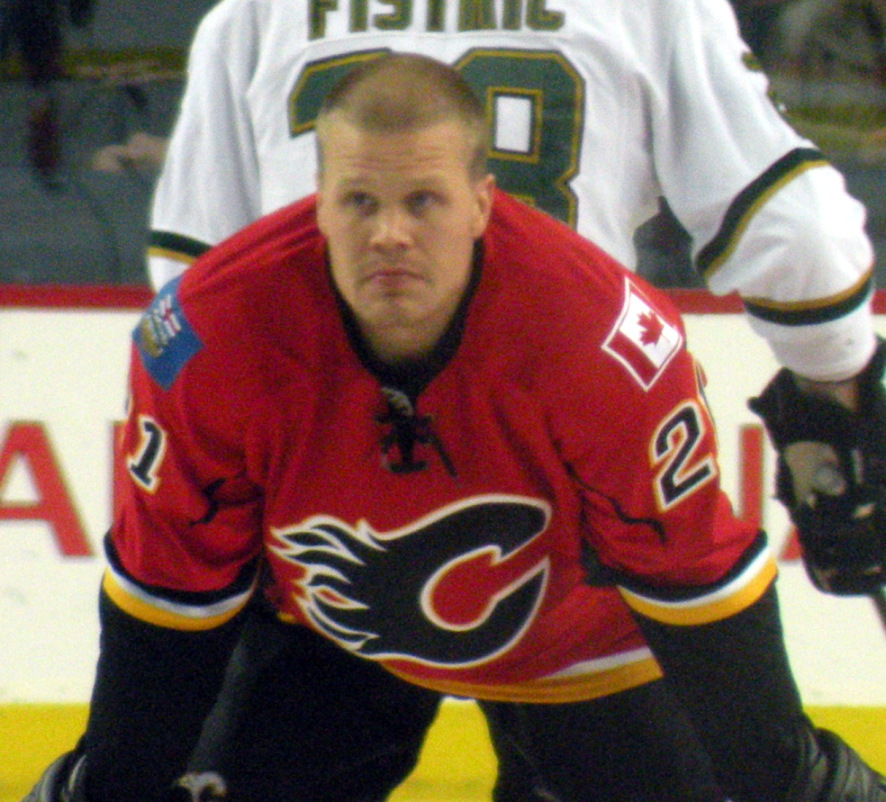
Olli Jokinen, shown here playing for the Flames, was previously Florida's all-time leader in goals, assists, and points.

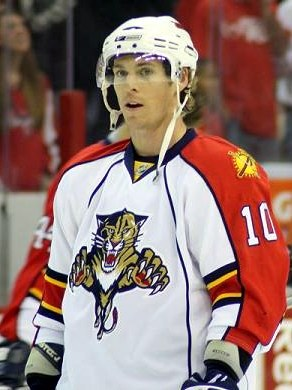
David Booth scored 31 goals for Florida in the 2008–09 season.

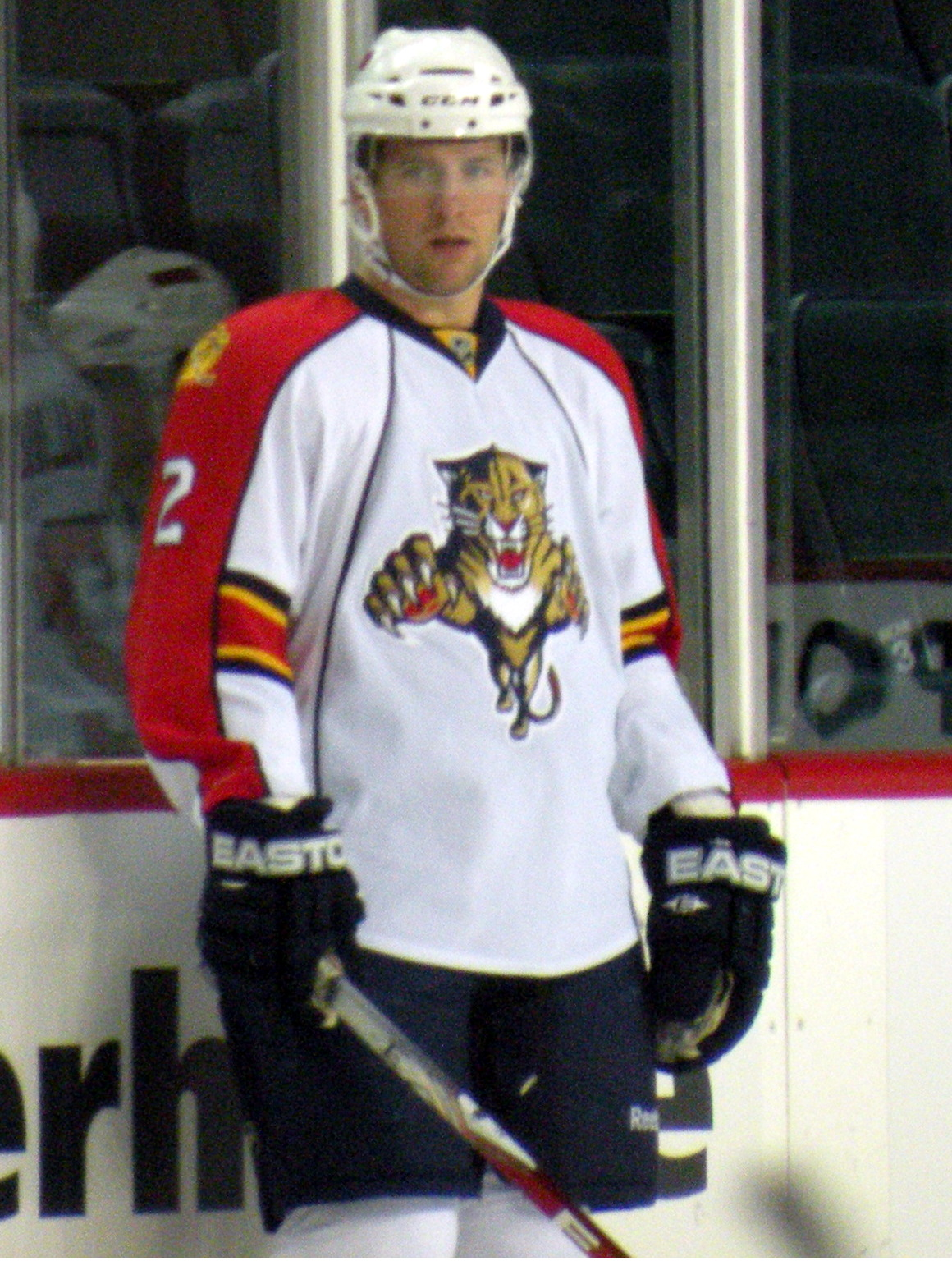
Keith Ballard was traded to Florida following the 2007–08 season.

Name	Nationality	Pos	Seasons	GP	G	A	P	PIM	GP	G	A	P	PIM	Notes
Name	Nationality	Pos	Seasons	Regular-season					Playoffs					Notes
Acciari, Noel	United States	C	2019–2022	127	27	19	46	41	19	0	0	0	0	
Adams, Greg	Canada	LW	2000–2001	60	11	12	23	10	—	—	—	—	—	
Adams, Kevyn	United States	C	2001–2002	56	7	14	21	30	—	—	—	—	—	
Allen, Bryan	Canada	D	2006–2011	284	14	53	67	341	—	—	—	—	—	
Allen, Chris	Canada	D	1997–1999	2	0	0	0	2	—	—	—	—	—	
Allison, Jamie	Canada	D	2005–2006	7	0	0	0	11	—	—	—	—	—	
Alscher, Marek*	Czech Republic	D	2025–2026	4	0	3	3	0	—	—	—	—	—	
Andersson, Peter	Sweden	D	1993–1994	8	1	1	2	0	—	—	—	—	—	
Asplund, Rasmus	Sweden	F	2024–2025	6	0	0	0	2	—	—	—	—	—	
Audette, Donald	Canada	RW	2003–2004	28	6	7	13	22	—	—	—	—	—	
Balcers, Rudolfs	Latvia	LW	2022–2023	14	2	2	4	4	—	—	—	—	—	
Balinskis, Uvis^{†}*	Latvia	D	2023–2026	156	10	26	36	65	5	1	0	1	2	SC 2025
Balisy, Chase	United States	C	2017–2018	8	0	0	0	0	—	—	—	—	—	
Ballard, Keith	United States	D	2008–2010	164	14	48	62	160	—	—	—	—	—	
Barch, Krys	Canada	RW	2011–2014	96	2	7	9	190	—	—	—	—	—	
Barkov, Aleksander^{†}*	Finland	C	2013–2026	804	286	496	782	164	94	25	56	81	32	2013 First-round draft pick Captain, 2018–present Lady Byng Memorial Trophy – 2018–19; Frank J. Selke Trophy – 2020–21, 2023–24; SC 2024 2025
Barnes, Stu	Canada	C	1993–1997	191	49	72	121	94	22	6	10	16	4	
Barrault, Doug	Canada	RW	1993–1994	2	0	0	0	0	—	—	—	—	—	
Barrie, Len	Canada	C	1993–1994; 1999–2001	76	9	24	33	141	4	0	0	0	0	
Beaudoin, Eric	Canada	LW	2001–2002	8	3	1	4	4	—	—	—	—	—	
Bednar, Jaroslav	Czech Republic	RW	2003–2004	13	1	1	2	4	—	—	—	—	—	
Belak, Wade	Canada	RW	2007–2009	32	0	0	0	37	—	—	—	—	—	
Belanger, Jesse	Canada	C	1993–1996	180	49	68	117	44	—	—	—	—	—	
Bennett, Sam^{†}*	Canada	C	2020–2026	365	121	133	254	433	77	29	30	59	140	SC 2024 2025
Benning, Brian	Canada	D	1993–1995	97	7	31	38	125	—	—	—	—	—	
Benning, Michael*	Canada	D	2025–2026	18	2	4	6	2	—	—	—	—	—	
Bergfors, Niclas	Sweden	RW	2010–2011	20	1	6	7	2	—	—	—	—	—	
Bergenheim, Sean	Finland	LW	2011–2015	163	41	29	70	122	7	3	3	6	4	
Berglund, Christian	Sweden	LW	2003–2004	10	3	1	4	10	—	—	—	—	—	
Bernier, Steve	Canada	RW	2010–2011	68	5	10	15	21	—	—	—	—	—	
Bertuzzi, Todd	Canada	LW	2006–2007	7	1	6	7	13	—	—	—	—	—	
Biron, Mathieu	Canada	D	2002–2004	91	4	18	22	65	—	—	—	—	—	
Bitz, Byron	Canada	RW	2009–2010	7	1	1	2	2	—	—	—	—	—	
Björnfot, Tobias*	Sweden	D	2023–2026	34	2	2	4	4	—	—	—	—	—	
Bjugstad, Nick	United States	C	2012–2019	394	87	104	191	176	5	2	2	4	2	2010 First-round draft pick
Boguniecki, Eric	United States	C	1999–2000	4	0	0	0	2	—	—	—	—	—	
Bolland, Dave	Canada	C	2014–2016	78	7	21	28	64	—	—	—	—	—	
Booth, David	United States	LW	2006–2012	309	87	80	167	127	—	—	—	—	—	
Boqvist, Adam	Sweden	D	2024–2025	18	2	4	6	6	—	—	—	—	—	
Boqvist, Jesper^{†}*	Sweden	C	2024–2026	151	16	20	36	30	13	2	3	5	0	SC 2025
Borgstrom, Henrik	Finland	C	2017–2020	58	9	10	19	6	—	—	—	—	—	2016 First-round draft pick
Bouwmeester, Jay	Canada	D	2002–2009	471	53	150	203	329	—	—	—	—	—	2002 First-round draft pick
Boyes, Brad	Canada	RW	2013–2015	156	35	39	74	48	—	—	—	—	—	
Boyle, Brian	United States	C	2019–2020	39	6	9	15	17	4	1	0	1	12	
Boyle, Dan	Canada	D	1998–2002	129	10	29	39	50	—	—	—	—	—	
Boynton, Nick	Canada	D	2008–2009	68	5	16	21	91	—	—	—	—	—	
Bradley, Matt	Canada	RW	2011–2012	45	3	5	8	31	—	—	—	—	—	
Brassard, Derick	Canada	C	2018–2019	10	1	3	4	2	—	—	—	—	—	
Brennan, T. J.	United States	D	2012–2013	19	2	7	9	2	—	—	—	—	—	
Brickley, Connor	United States	C	2016–2018	67	5	12	17	33	—	—	—	—	—	
Brine, David	Canada	C	2007–2008	9	0	1	1	4	—	—	—	—	—	
Brousseau, Paul	Canada	RW	2000–2001	1	0	0	0	0	—	—	—	—	—	
Brouwer, Troy	Canada	RW	2018–2019	75	12	9	21	47	—	—	—	—	—	
Brown, Josh	Canada	D	2018–2020	93	4	6	10	67	2	0	0	0	0	
Brown, Keith	Canada	D	1993–1995	64	4	8	12	62	—	—	—	—	—	
Bure, Pavel^{†}	Russia	RW	1998–2002	223	152	99	251	134	4	1	3	4	2	Co-captain, 2001–2002; Maurice "Rocket" Richard Trophy – 1999–00, 2000–01; HHOF 2012
Bure, Valeri	Russia	RW	2001–2003; 2003–2004	132	33	56	89	42	—	—	—	—	—	
Butler, Bobby	United States	RW	2013–2015	2	0	1	1	2	—	—	—	—	—	
Butsayev, Vyacheslav	Russia	C	1998–1999	1	0	0	0	2	—	—	—	—	—	
Cairns, Eric	Canada	D	2005–2006	23	0	1	1	37	—	—	—	—	—	
Callahan, Joe	United States	D	2010–2011	27	0	1	1	12	—	—	—	—	—	
Campbell, Brian	Canada	D	2011–2015	376	28	147	175	86	13	1	5	6	3	Lady Byng Memorial Trophy – 2011–12
Campbell, Gregory	Canada	C	2005–2010	363	29	56	85	312	—	—	—	—	—	
Campbell, Jim	United States	RW	2002–2003	1	0	0	0	0	—	—	—	—	—	
Carkner, Terry	Canada	D	1995–1999	279	6	40	46	293	27	0	4	4	16	
Carlsson, Lucas	Sweden	D	2021–2023	42	3	6	9	12	—	—	—	—	—	
Carter, Ryan	United States	C	2010–2012	19	2	1	3	28	—	—	—	—	—	
Caruso, Michael	Canada	D	2012–2013	2	0	0	0	0	—	—	—	—	—	
Casselman, Mike	Canada	LW	1995–1996	3	0	0	0	0	—	—	—	—	—	
Chiarot, Ben	Canada	D	2021–2022	20	2	6	8	6	10	0	1	1	8	
Ciccarelli, Dino^{†}	Canada	RW	1997–1999	42	11	12	23	55	—	—	—	—	—	HHOF 2010
Cirella, Joe	Canada	D	1993–1995	83	1	10	11	120	—	—	—	—	—	
Connauton, Kevin	Canada	D	2020–2022	20	0	1	1	9	—	—	—	—	—	
Connolly, Brett	Canada	RW	2019–2021	90	21	16	37	28	4	0	0	0	2	
Cousins, Nick	Canada	C	2022–2024	148	16	26	42	102	33	2	6	8	36	SC 2024
Crabb, Joey	United States	RW	2013–2014	9	0	1	1	7	—	—	—	—	—	
Cullen, Mark	Canada	LW	2011–2012	6	0	1	1	2	—	—	—	—	—	
Cullen, Matt	United States	C	2002–2004	86	12	19	31	46	—	—	—	—	—	
Cullimore, Jassen	Canada	D	2007–2009	133	5	18	23	75	—	—	—	—	—	
Dadonov, Evgenii	Russia	RW	2009–2012; 2017–2020	280	91	111	202	42	4	0	1	1	2	
Dagenais, Pierre	Canada	LW	2001–2003	35	7	1	8	8	—	—	—	—	—	
Dalpe, Zac	Canada	RW	2021–2023	15	2	2	4	2	13	1	0	1	2	
Daniels, Jeff	Canada	LW	1993–1995	10	0	0	0	0	—	—	—	—	—	
Davydov, Evgeny	Russia	RW	1993–1994	21	2	6	8	8	—	—	—	—	—	
Demers, Jason	Canada	D	2016–2017	81	9	19	28	53	—	—	—	—	—	
Denisenko, Grigori	Russia	LW	2020–2023	26	0	7	7	8	1	0	0	0	0	2018 First-round draft pick
Devine, Jack*	United States	RW	2025–2026	6	0	0	0	2	—	—	—	—	—	
Dionne, Gilbert	Canada	LW	1995–1996	5	1	2	3	0	—	—	—	—	—	
Duchesne, Gaetan	Canada	LW	1994–1995	13	1	2	3	0	—	—	—	—	—	
Duco, Mike	Canada	C	2009–2011	12	0	0	0	60	—	—	—	—	—	
Duclair, Anthony	Canada	LW	2020–2023	137	43	56	99	50	34	5	9	14	26	
Duerden, Dave	Canada	LW	1999–2000	2	0	0	0	0	—	—	—	—	—	
Dvorak, Radek	Czech Republic	RW	1995–2000; 2007–2011	613	113	155	268	216	19	1	3	4	0	1995 First-round draft pick
Eakins, Dallas	United States	D	1993–1995; 1997–1998	41	0	2	2	79	—	—	—	—	—	
Ekblad, Aaron^{†}*	Canada	D	2014–2026	804	122	284	406	560	83	8	25	33	87	2014 First overall draft pick Calder Memorial Trophy – 2015; SC 2024 2025
Ekman-Larsson, Oliver^{†}	Sweden	D	2023–2024	80	9	23	32	76	24	2	4	6	24	SC 2024
Ellerby, Keaton	Canada	D	2009–2013	125	2	15	17	70	1	0	0	0	2	2007 First-round draft pick
Eminger, Steve	Canada	D	2008–2009	9	1	0	1	6	—	—	—	—	—	
Emma, David	United States	RW	2000–2001	6	0	0	0	0	—	—	—	—	—	
Eriksson, Anders	Sweden	D	2000–2001	60	0	21	21	28	—	—	—	—	—	
Ference, Brad	Canada	D	1999–2003	167	4	24	28	432	—	—	—	—	—	
Ferguson, Craig	United States	C	1996–1997; 1999–2000	6	0	0	0	0	—	—	—	—	—	
Fisher, Craig	Canada	LW	1996–1997	4	0	0	0	0	—	—	—	—	—	
Fitzgerald, Casey	United States	D	2022–2023	4	0	0	0	0	2	0	0	0	10	
Fitzgerald, Tom	United States	RW	1993–1998	353	54	67	121	281	27	4	5	9	34	
Fleischmann, Tomas	Czech Republic	LW	2011–2015	262	54	91	145	72	7	1	2	3	2	
Foligno, Mike	Canada	RW	1993–1994	39	4	5	9	49	—	—	—	—	—	
Foote, Nolan*	Canada	LW	2025–2026	12	1	0	1	6	—	—	—	—	—	
Forsling, Gustav^{†}*	Sweden	D	2022–2026	435	51	142	193	176	84	8	23	31	34	SC 2024 2025
Frolik, Michael	Czech Republic	C	2008–2011	213	50	67	117	81	—	—	—	—	—	2006 First-round draft pick
Gadjovich, Jonah*	Canada	LW	2023–2026	91	6	5	11	171	16	2	1	3	33	SC 2024 2025
Gagner, Dave	Canada	C	1997–1999	114	24	38	62	94	—	—	—	—	—	
Garpenlov, Johan	Sweden	LW	1994–1999	265	47	74	121	133	24	6	2	8	12	
Garrison, Jason	Canada	D	2008–2012	190	23	36	59	81	4	1	2	3	0	
Gelinas, Martin	Canada	LW	2005–2007	164	31	54	85	116	—	—	—	—	—	
Gilbert, Tom	United States	D	2013–2014	73	3	25	28	18	—	—	—	—	—	
Giles, Patrick	United States	F	2024–2025	9	0	0	0	0	—	—	—	—	—	
Gilhen, Randy	Canada	LW	1993–1994	20	4	4	8	16	—	—	—	—	—	
Gilroy, Matt	United States	D	2013–2014	16	1	1	2	6	—	—	—	—	—	
Giroux, Claude	Canada	C	2021–2022	18	3	20	23	6	10	3	5	8	0	
Glass, Tanner	Canada	C	2007–2009	44	1	1	2	46	—	—	—	—	—	
Globke, Rob	United States	RW	2005–2008	46	1	1	2	8	—	—	—	—	—	
Goc, Marcel	Germany	C	2011–2014	161	31	38	69	49	7	2	3	5	0	
Godynyuk, Alexander	Ukraine	D	1993–1994	26	0	10	10	35	—	—	—	—	—	
Golubovsky, Yan	Russia	D	2000–2001	6	0	2	2	2	—	—	—	—	—	
Gomez, Scott	United States	C	2013–2014	46	2	10	12	24	—	—	—	—	—	
Goren, Lee	Canada	RW	2003–2004	2	0	1	1	0	—	—	—	—	—	
Gratton, Chris	Canada	C	2005–2007	157	30	44	74	198	—	—	—	—	—	
Greco, Anthony	United States	RW	2018–2019	1	0	0	0	0	—	—	—	—	—	
Gregor, Noah*	Canada	C	2025–2026	37	4	5	9	26	—	—	—	—	—	
Green, Mike A.	Canada	C	2003–2004	11	0	1	1	2	—	—	—	—	—	
Greenlaw, Jeff	Canada	LW	1993–1994	4	0	1	1	2	—	—	—	—	—	
Greer, A.J.^{†}*	Canada	LW	2024–2026	159	23	26	49	243	16	2	1	3	22	SC 2025
Griffith, Seth	Canada	C	2016–2017	21	0	5	5	8	—	—	—	—	—	
Grimaldi, Rocco	United States	C	2014–2015	7	1	0	1	4	—	—	—	—	—	
Gudas, Radko	Czech Republic	D	2020–2023	203	7	37	44	224	37	1	6	7	44	
Gudbranson, Erik	Canada	D	2011–2016	309	11	32	43	346	13	0	0	0	10	2010 First-round draft pick
Gustafsson, Per	Sweden	D	1996–1997	58	7	22	29	22	—	—	—	—	—	
Haapala, Henrik	Finland	LW	2017–2018	5	0	1	1	0	—	—	—	—	—	
Hagg, Robert	Sweden	D	2021–2022	16	0	1	1	10	—	—	—	—	—	
Hagman, Niklas	Finland	LW	2001–2006	263	30	50	80	52	—	—	—	—	—	
Haley, Micheal	Canada	C	2017–2019	99	4	8	12	242	—	—	—	—	—	
Harkins, Brett	United States	LW	1995–1996	8	0	3	3	6	—	—	—	—	—	
Harper, Shane	United States	RW	2016–2017	14	2	1	3	18	—	—	—	—	—	
Haula, Erik	Finland	LW	2019–2020	7	0	2	2	2	4	1	0	1	0	
Hawryluk, Jayce	Canada	C	2018–2020	57	8	7	15	24	—	—	—	—	—	
Hawgood, Greg	Canada	D	1993–1994	33	2	14	16	9	—	—	—	—	—	
Hay, Dwayne	Canada	LW	1998–2000	15	0	0	0	2	—	—	—	—	—	
Hayes, Jimmy	United States	RW	2013–2015	125	30	23	53	38	—	—	—	—	—	
Hedican, Bret	United States	D	1998–2002	202	17	48	65	169	4	0	0	0	0	
Heponiemi, Aleksi	Finland	C	2020–2023	25	2	4	6	6	—	—	—	—	—	
Herr, Matt	United States	C	2001–2002	3	0	0	0	0	—	—	—	—	—	
Hicks, Alex	Canada	LW	1998–2000	59	1	8	9	62	4	0	1	1	4	
Higgins, Chris	United States	LW	2010–2011	48	11	12	23	10	—	—	—	—	—	
Hill Sean	United States	D	2005–2006	78	2	18	20	80	—	—	—	—	—	
Hinostroza, Vinnie*	United States	C	2020–2021; 2025–2026	26	3	5	8	16	—	—	—	—	—	
Hoffman, Mike	Canada	C/LW	2018–2020	151	65	64	129	58	4	3	2	5	4	
Hordichuk, Darcy	Canada	LW	2002–2004; 2010–2011	124	4	5	9	249	—	—	—	—	—	
Hornqvist, Patric	Sweden	RW	2020–2023	131	26	37	63	71	16	3	4	7	16	
Horton, Nathan	Canada	RW	2005–2010	422	142	153	295	382	—	—	—	—	—	2003 First-round draft pick
Hough, Mike	Canada	RW	1993–1997	259	27	52	79	185	27	5	1	6	10	
Hovorka, Mikulas*	Czech Republic	D	2025–2026	4	0	1	1	0	—	—	—	—	—	
Howden, Quinton	Canada	C	2012–2016	92	10	7	17	30	—	—	—	—	—	2010 First-round draft pick
Huberdeau, Jonathan	Canada	C	2012–2022	671	198	415	613	341	26	5	16	21	20	2011 First-round draft pick Calder Memorial Trophy – 2012–13
Hudler, Jiri	Czech Republic	C	2015–2016	19	6	5	11	10	6	0	1	1	4	
Hull, Jody	Canada	RW	1993–1997	260	54	44	98	45	19	3	2	5	0	
Hunt, Dryden	Canada	LW	2017–2020	63	3	12	15	34	2	0	0	0	0	
Huselius, Kristian	Sweden	LW	2001–2006	257	58	69	127	62	—	—	—	—	—	
Jacina, Greg	Canada	RW	2005–2007	14	0	1	1	6	—	—	—	—	—	
Jackman, Ric	Canada	D	2005–2007	22	2	1	3	16	—	—	—	—	—	
Jagr, Jaromir	Czech Republic	RW	2014–2017	181	49	81	130	110	6	0	2	2	4	Bill Masterton Memorial Trophy – 2015–16
Jakopin, John	Canada	D	1997–2001	82	1	2	3	92	—	—	—	—	—	
Jansson, Ludvig*	Sweden	D	2025–2026	4	0	1	1	0	—	—	—	—	—	
Jardine, Ryan	Canada	LW	2001–2002	8	0	2	2	2	—	—	—	—	—	
Jessiman, Hugh	United States	RW	2010–2011	2	0	0	0	5	—	—	—	—	—	
Johansson, Magnus	Sweden	D	2007–2008	27	0	10	10	14	—	—	—	—	—	
Johnson, Ryan	Canada	C	1997–2003	164	8	22	30	50	—	—	—	—	—	
Jokinen, Jussi	Finland	C	2014–2017	231	37	95	132	115	6	1	3	4	4	
Jokinen, Olli	Finland	C	2000–2008	567	188	231	419	597	—	—	—	—	—	Captain, 2003–2008
Jones, Seth^{†}*	United States	D	2024–2026	73	9	32	41	22	23	4	5	9	10	SC 2025
Jones, Ty	United States	RW	2003–2004	6	0	0	0	7	—	—	—	—	—	
Jovanovski, Ed	Canada	D	1995–1999; 2011–2014	362	33	69	102	619	34	1	8	9	60	1994 First-round draft pick Captain, 2012–2014
Juolevi, Olli	Finland	D	2021–2022	10	0	0	0	2	—	—	—	—	—	
Juulsen, Noah	Canada	D	2020–2021	4	0	0	0	0	—	—	—	—	—	
Kampfer, Steven	United States	D	2014–2017	72	2	6	8	42	—	—	—	—	—	
Karpovtsev, Alexander	Russia	D	2005–2006	6	0	0	0	4	—	—	—	—	—	
Kearns, Bracken	Canada	C	2011–2012	5	0	0	0	10	—	—	—	—	—	
Keeper, Brady	Canada	D	2018–2021	2	0	0	0	0	1	0	0	0	0	
Kennedy, Tim	United States	LW	2010–2012	33	1	2	3	4	—	—	—	—	—	
Kiersted, Matt	United States	D	2020–2025	39	2	5	7	12	—	—	—	—	—	
Kindl, Jakub	Czech Republic	D	2015–2017	58	0	6	6	32	1	0	0	0	0	
Kiselevich, Bogdan	Russia	D	2018–2019	32	0	8	8	12	—	—	—	—	—	
Koistinen, Ville	Finland	D	2009–2010	17	1	3	4	8	—	—	—	—	—	
Kolnik, Juraj	Slovakia	RW	2002–2007	204	40	46	86	72	—	—	—	—	—	
Kopecky, Tomas	Slovakia	RW	2011–2015	240	31	48	79	106	7	1	0	1	4	
Kovalev, Alexei	Russia	RW	2012–2013	14	2	3	5	6	—	—	—	—	—	
Kozlov, Viktor	Russia	C	1997–2004	414	101	190	291	118	4	0	1	1	0	
Krajicek, Lukas	Czech Republic	D	2001–2006	90	3	20	23	62	—	—	—	—	—	2001 First-round draft pick
Kravchuk, Igor	Russia	D	2002–2003	7	0	1	1	4	—	—	—	—	—	
Kreps, Kamil	Czech Republic	C	2006–2010	232	18	42	60	71	—	—	—	—	—	
Kuba, Filip	Czech Republic	D	1998–2000; 2012–2013	62	2	15	17	26	—	—	—	—	—	
Kudelski, Bob	United States	C	1993–1996	83	20	19	39	12	—	—	—	—	—	
Kudroc, Kristian	Slovakia	D	2003–2004	2	0	0	0	2	—	—	—	—	—	
Kulikov, Dmitri^{†}*	Russia	D	2009–2016; 2023–2026	625	33	138	171	411	50	3	8	11	38	2009 First-round draft pick SC 2024 2025
Kunin, Luke*	United States	C	2025–2026	62	4	6	10	47	—	—	—	—	—	
Kvasha, Oleg	Russia	C	1998–2000	146	17	33	50	73	4	0	0	0	0	
Kwiatkowski, Joel	Canada	D	2005–2007	114	9	13	22	106	—	—	—	—	—	
Lammikko, Juho	Finland	RW	2018–2021	84	4	7	11	16	—	—	—	—	—	
Larionov, Igor^{†}	Russia	C	2000–2001	26	5	6	11	10	—	—	—	—	—	HHOF 2008
Lawman, Drew	United States	C	2006–2008	22	2	1	3	4	—	—	—	—	—	
Laus, Paul	Canada	D	1993–2002	530	14	58	72	1,720	30	2	7	9	74	Co-captain, 2001–2002
Leach, Jamie	Canada	RW	1993–1994	2	1	0	1	0	—	—	—	—	—	
Lebeau, Patrick	Canada	LW	1993–1994	4	1	1	2	4	—	—	—	—	—	
Leopold, Jordan	United States	D	2009–2010	61	7	11	18	22	—	—	—	—	—	
Levins, Scott	Canada	LW	1993–1994	29	5	6	11	69	—	—	—	—	—	
Levtchi, Anton	Finland	F	2022–2023	2	0	0	0	0	—	—	—	—	—	
Lilja, Andreas	Sweden	D	2002–2004	135	7	12	19	146	—	—	—	—	—	
Lindbohm, Petteri	Finland	D	2021–2022	9	0	1	1	5	—	—	—	—	—	
Linden Jamie	Canada	RW	1994–1995	4	0	0	0	17	—	—	—	—	—	
Lindsay, Bill	United States	RW	1993–1999; 2001–2002	506	67	98	165	609	25	5	6	11	26	
Lockwood, William	United States	RW	2023–2024	26	0	1	1	16	—	—	—	—	—	
Lojek, Martin	Czech Republic	D	2006–2008	5	1	1	1	0	—	—	—	—	—	
Lomakin, Andrei	Russia	LW	1993–1995	107	20	34	54	32	—	—	—	—	—	
Lomberg, Ryan^{†}	Canada	LW	2020–2024	257	28	22	50	359	32	3	0	3	64	SC 2024
Lorentz, Steven^{†}	Canada	C/LW	2023–2024	38	1	2	3	10	16	2	1	3	0	SC 2024
Lowry, Dave	Canada	LW	1993–1998	272	50	60	110	178	27	10	7	17	39	
Lundell, Anton^{†}*	Finland	C	2021–2026	359	78	123	201	177	77	12	34	46	30	2020 First-round draft pick SC 2024 2025
Luostarinen, Eetu^{†}*	Finland	C	2019–2026	439	61	100	161	138	73	10	24	34	53	SC 2024 2025
MacDonald, Craig	Canada	LW	2003–2004	34	0	3	3	25	—	—	—	—	—	
MacDonald, Jacob	United States	D	2018–2019	2	1	0	1	0	—	—	—	—	—	
MacIntyre, Steve	Canada	LW	2009–2010	18	0	1	1	17	—	—	—	—	—	
MacKenzie, Derek	Canada	C	2014–2019	304	20	34	54	162	6	0	1	1	4	Captain, 2016–2018
Madden, John	Canada	C	2011–2012	31	3	0	3	4	7	0	0	0	0	
Mahura, Josh	Canada	D	2022–2024	112	4	21	25	68	21	0	3	3	6	
Majesky, Ivan	Slovakia	D	2002–2003	82	4	8	12	92	—	—	—	—	—	
Malgin, Denis	Switzerland	C	2016–2020	184	28	32	60	40	—	—	—	—	—	
Mamin, Maxim	Russia	C/RW	2017–2022	73	10	8	18	25	4	0	0	0	0	
Marchand, Brad^{†}*	Canada	LW	2024–2026	62	29	29	58	40	23	10	10	20	48	SC 2025
Marchessault, Jonathan	Canada	C	2016–2017	75	30	21	51	38	—	—	—	—	—	
Marchment, Mason	Canada	F	2020–2022	87	20	37	57	71	10	3	0	3	14	
Martin, Craig	Canada	RW	1996–1997	1	0	0	0	5	—	—	—	—	—	
Matheson, Mike	Canada	D	2015–2020	299	33	58	91	157	7	0	1	1	8	2012 First-round draft pick
Matsumoto, Jon	Canada	C	2011–2012	1	0	0	0	0	—	—	—	—	—	
Matteau, Stephane	Canada	LW	2002–2003	52	4	4	8	27	—	—	—	—	—	
Matthias, Shawn	Canada	C	2007–2014	312	48	49	97	109	7	0	1	1	6	
McArdle, Kenndal	Canada	LW	2008–2011	33	1	2	3	47	—	—	—	—	—	2005 First-round draft pick
McCabe, Bryan	Canada	D	2008–2011	199	28	76	104	152	—	—	—	—	—	Captain, 2009–2011
McCann, Jared	Canada	C	2016–2019	143	18	35	53	52	—	—	—	—	—	
McCoshen, Ian	United States	D	2016–2019	60	4	3	7	33	—	—	—	—	—	
McGinn, Jamie	Canada	LW	2017–2019	95	17	19	36	39	—	—	—	—	—	
McIlrath, Dylan	Canada	D	2016–2017	5	1	0	1	10	—	—	—	—	—	
McKegg, Greg	Canada	D	2015–2017	46	5	3	8	13	1	0	0	0	2	
McLean, Brett	Canada	C	2007–2009	147	21	35	56	63	—	—	—	—	—	
McNeill, Grant	Canada	D	2003–2004	3	0	0	0	5	—	—	—	—	—	
Megna, Jaycob	United States	D	2024–2025	8	0	0	0	2	—	—	—	—	—	
Mellanby, Scott	Canada	RW	1993–2001	552	157	197	354	953	31	3	9	12	50	Captain, 1997–2001
Messier, Eric	Canada	D	2003–2004	21	0	3	3	16	—	—	—	—	—	
Meyer, Stefan	Canada	LW	2007–2008	4	0	0	0	0	—	—	—	—	—	
Mezei, Branislav	Slovakia	D	2002–2008	174	4	13	17	246	—	—	—	—	—	
Mikkola, Niko^{†}*	Finland	D	2023–2026	226	12	38	50	186	46	5	5	10	59	SC 2024 2025
Mitchell, Willie	Canada	D	2014–2015	66	3	5	8	25	—	—	—	—	—	Captain, 2014–2016
Moller, Randy	Canada	D	1994–1995	17	0	3	3	16	—	—	—	—	—	
Montador, Steve	Canada	D	2005–2008	196	10	28	38	260	—	—	—	—	—	
Montour, Brandon^{†}	Canada	D	2020–2024	239	37	110	147	217	61	11	16	27	63	SC 2024
Moore, Dominic	Canada	C	2009–2010	48	8	9	17	35	—	—	—	—	—	
Morisset, David	Canada	RW	2001–2002	4	0	0	0	5	—	—	—	—	—	
Mottau, Mike	United States	D	2013–2014	8	0	0	0	4	—	—	—	—	—	
Mueller, Peter	United States	C	2012–2013	43	8	9	17	18	—	—	—	—	—	
Muller, Kirk	Canada	LW	1996–1999	162	13	34	74	107	5	1	2	3	4	
Murphy, Cory	Canada	D	2007–2009	54	2	16	18	24	—	—	—	—	—	
Murphy, Gord	Canada	D	1993–1999	410	42	100	142	238	19	0	9	9	10	
Murry, Garth	Canada	C	2007–2008	6	0	0	0	19	—	—	—	—	—	
Nedorost, Vaclav	Czech Republic	C	2003–2004	32	4	3	7	12	—	—	—	—	—	
Nemirovsky, David	Canada	RW	1995–1999	91	16	22	38	42	3	1	0	1	0	
Niedermayer, Rob	Canada	C	1993–2001	518	101	165	266	435	31	8	4	12	24	1993 First-round draft pick
Nieuwendyk, Joe^{†}	Canada	C	2005–2007	80	31	33	64	50	—	—	—	—	—	HHOF 2011
Nilson, Marcus	Sweden	LW	1998–2004	327	48	78	126	193	—	—	—	—	—	1996 First-round draft pick
Norton, Brad	United States	D	2001–2002	22	0	2	2	45	—	—	—	—	—	
Norton, Jeff	United States	D	1997–1999; 2001–2002	51	0	11	11	28	—	—	—	—	—	
Nosek, Tomas^{†}*	Czech Republic	C	2024–2026	80	3	10	13	14	16	0	3	3	4	SC 2025
Novoseltsev, Ivan	Russia	RW	1999–2004	217	29	44	73	106	—	—	—	—	—	
Nutivaara, Markus	Finland	D	2021–2022	1	0	1	1	0	5	0	0	0	14	
O'Brien, Shane	Canada	D	2014–2015	9	0	1	1	5	—	—	—	—	—	
Odelein, Lyle	Canada	D	2003–2004	82	4	12	16	88	—	—	—	—	—	
Okposo, Kyle^{†}	United States	RW	2023–2024	6	0	0	0	2	17	0	2	2	10	SC 2024
Olesz, Rostislav	Czech Republic	LW	2005–2011	349	57	75	132	112	—	—	—	—	—	2004 First-round draft pick
Olsen, Dylan	United States	D	2013–2015	72	5	16	21	34	—	—	—	—	—	
Olson, Josh	United States	LW	2003–2004	5	1	0	1	0	—	—	—	—	—	
Oreskovich, Victor	Canada	RW	2009–2010	50	2	4	6	26	—	—	—	—	—	
Ozolinsh, Sandis	Latvia	D	2001–2003	88	17	38	55	64	—	—	—	—	—	
Parrish, Mark	United States	RW	1998–2000	154	50	31	81	64	4	0	1	1	0	
Parros, George	United States	RW	2012–2013	39	1	1	2	57	—	—	—	—	—	
Payer, Serge	Canada	C	2000–2001; 2005–2006	114	7	5	12	47	—	—	—	—	—	
Peltonen, Ville	Finland	LW	2006–2009	207	34	54	88	79	—	—	—	—	—	
Petrovic, Alex	Canada	D	2012–2019	254	5	44	49	358	6	1	3	4	4	
Petry, Jeff*	United States	D	2025–2026	58	0	8	8	22	—	—	—	—	—	
Piros, Kamil	Czech Republic	C	2003–2004	3	1	0	1	0	—	—	—	—	—	
Pirri, Brandon	Canada	C	2013–2016	122	40	22	62	46	—	—	—	—	—	
Pitlick, Lance	United States	D	1999–2002	165	5	8	13	98	4	0	1	1	0	
Podkonicky, Andrej	Slovakia	C	2000–2001	6	1	0	1	2	—	—	—	—	—	
Podollan, Jason	Canada	C	1996–1997	19	1	1	2	4	—	—	—	—	—	
Priskie, Chase	United States	D	2021–2022	4	0	0	0	2	—	—	—	—	—	
Prospal, Vaclav	Czech Republic	LW	2000–2001	34	4	12	16	10	—	—	—	—	—	
Puljujarvi, Jesse	Finland	RW	2024–2025	5	1	0	1	15	—	—	—	—	—	
Purcell, Teddy	Canada	C	2015–2016	15	3	8	11	2	6	2	0	2	0	
Pysyk, Mark	Canada	D	2016–2020	292	17	45	62	76	4	0	0	0	0	
Racine, Jonathan	Canada	D	2013–2015	1	0	0	0	2	—	—	—	—	—	
Rallo, Greg	United States	C	2011–2013	11	1	0	1	2	—	—	—	—	—	
Ratchuk, Peter	United States	D	1998–2001	32	1	1	2	10	—	—	—	—	—	
Rau, Kyle	United States	C	2015–2017	33	2	1	3	6	—	—	—	—	—	
Reasoner, Marty	Canada	C	2010–2011	82	14	18	32	22	—	—	—	—	—	
Reilly, Mike	United States	D	2023–2024	2	0	0	0	2	—	—	—	—	—	
Reinhardt, Cole*	Canada	LW	2025–2026	15	6	2	8	2	—	—	—	—	—	
Reinhart, Sam^{†}*	Canada	C	2021–2026	385	189	196	385	93	76	32	24	56	32	SC 2024 2025
Reinprecht, Steven	Canada	C	2009–2011	111	20	28	48	24	—	—	—	—	—	
Repik, Michal	Czech Republic	LW	2008–2012	72	9	11	20	30	—	—	—	—	—	
Rheault, Jon	United States	RW	2012–2013	5	0	0	0	0	—	—	—	—	—	
Richer, Stephane	Canada	D	1993–1995	3	0	1	1	2	—	—	—	—	—	
Rissmiller, Patrick	United States	LW	2010–2011	9	0	1	1	0	—	—	—	—	—	
Ritchie, Byron	Canada	C	2001–2004	111	10	15	25	137	—	—	—	—	—	
Rivers, Jamie	Canada	C	2002–2003	1	0	0	0	2	—	—	—	—	—	
Robak, Colby	Canada	D	2011–2014	35	0	3	3	23	—	—	—	—	—	
Roberts, Gary	Canada	LW	2005–2007	108	27	42	69	122	—	—	—	—	—	
Rodrigues, Evan^{†}*	Canada	C	2023–2026	231	38	64	102	110	45	9	21	30	14	SC 2024 2025
Rossiter, Kyle	Canada	D	2001–2004	9	0	0	0	9	—	—	—	—	—	
Saarela, Aleksi	Finland	C	2019–2020	9	2	2	4	0	1	0	0	0	0	
Salei, Ruslan	Belarus	D	2006–2008	147	9	46	55	177	—	—	—	—	—	
Samoskevich, Mackie^{†}*	United States	RW	2023–2026	156	27	36	63	42	4	0	1	1	4	2021 First-round draft pick, SC 2025
Samsonov, Sergei	Russia	LW	2010–2011	20	3	11	14	02	—	—	—	—	—	
Samuelsson, Mikael	Sweden	RW	2003–2004; 2011–2012	85	16	21	37	49	7	0	5	5	2	
Santorelli, Mike	Canada	C	2010–2013	166	31	24	55	40	—	—	—	—	—	
Sceviour, Colton	Canada	C/RW	2016–2020	284	31	48	79	70	—	—	—	—	—	
Schmidt, Nate^{†}	United States	D	2024–2025	80	5	17	22	22	23	3	9	12	4	SC 2025
Schwindt, Cole	Canada	RW	2021–2022; 2025–2026	32	5	2	7	2	—	—	—	—	—	
Sebrango, Donovan*	Canada	D	2025–2026	40	0	8	8	63	—	—	—	—	—	
Seidenberg, Dennis	Germany	D	2009–2010	62	2	21	23	33	—	—	—	—	—	
Selleck, Eric	Canada	LW	2012–2013	2	0	1	1	17	—	—	—	—	—	
Semenov, Alexei	Russia	D	2005–2007	39	1	6	7	49	—	—	—	—	—	
Severyn, Brent	Canada	D	1993–1995	76	5	8	13	193	—	—	—	—	—	
Sgarbossa, Michael	Canada	C	2016–2017	29	2	5	7	9	—	—	—	—	—	
Shaw, Logan	Canada	C	2015–2016	53	5	2	7	13	3	0	0	0	0	
Sheahan, Riley	Canada	C	2018–2019	33	2	8	10	4	—	—	—	—	—	
Sheppard, Ray	Canada	RW	1995–1998; 1999–2000	190	61	60	121	33	26	10	8	18	0	
Shore, Drew	United States	C	2012–2015	67	8	12	20	22	—	—	—	—	—	
Shvidki, Denis	Russia	RW	2000–2004	76	11	14	25	30	—	—	—	—	—	1999 First-round draft pick
Sillinger, Mike	Canada	RW	1999–2001	68	17	25	42	60	4	2	1	3	2	
Sim, Jon	Canada	LW	2005–2006	33	10	8	18	26	—	—	—	—	—	
Simpson, Todd	Canada	LW	1999–2001	107	2	9	11	276	4	0	0	0	4	
Skille, Jack	United States	RW	2010–2013	99	8	16	24	43	—	—	—	—	—	
Skoog, Wilmer*	Sweden	F	2025–2026	3	0	2	2	4	—	—	—	—	—	
Skrastins, Karlis	Latvia	D	2007–2009	97	5	14	19	42	—	—	—	—	—	
Skrudland, Brian	Canada	C	1993–1997	256	32	67	99	401	21	1	3	4	18	Captain, 1993–1997
Smith, Geoff	Canada	D	1993–1997	137	6	16	22	82	1	0	0	0	2	
Smith, Givani	Canada	RW	2022–2023	34	1	3	4	72	1	0	0	0	2	
Smith, Nick	Canada	C	2001–2002	15	0	0	0	0	—	—	—	—	—	
Smith, Reilly	Canada	C	2015–2017	162	40	47	87	48	6	4	4	8	0	
Smithson, Jerred	Canada	RW	2011–2013	51	2	4	6	14	5	0	1	1	2	
Smyth, Brad	Canada	RW	1995–1997	15	2	1	3	6	—	—	—	—	—	
Smyth, Greg	Canada	D	1993–1994	12	1	0	1	37	—	—	—	—	—	
Sourdif, Justin	Canada	RW	2023–2025	4	1	0	1	0	—	—	—	—	—	
Spacek, Jaroslav	Czech Republic	D	1998–2001	157	15	39	54	89	4	0	0	0	0	
Sprukts, Janis	Latvia	C	2006–2009	14	1	2	3	2	—	—	—	—	—	
Staal, Eric	Canada	C	2022–2023	72	14	15	29	26	21	2	3	5	12	
Staal, Marc	Canada	D	2022–2023	82	3	12	15	43	21	0	0	0	10	
Stenlund, Kevin^{†}	Sweden	C	2023–2024	81	11	4	15	62	24	0	1	1	8	SC 2024
Stewart, Anthony	Canada	RW	2005–2009	105	4	8	12	38	—	—	—	—	—	2003 First-round draft pick
Stewart, Cam	Canada	LW	1999–2000	65	9	7	16	30	—	—	—	—	—	
Stillman, Cory	Canada	LW	2008–2011	165	39	70	109	79	—	—	—	—	—	
Stillman, Riley	Canada	D	2018–2021	43	0	5	5	30	3	0	0	0	0	
Strachan, Tyson	Canada	D	2011–2013	53	1	6	7	45	2	0	1	1	0	
Straka, Martin	Czech Republic	C	1995–1997	67	9	26	35	18	17	2	2	4	2	
Strålman, Anton	Sweden	D	2019–2021	107	8	20	28	22	9	0	0	0	2	
Studnicka, Jack*	Canada	C	2025–2026	19	0	0	0	4	—	—	—	—	—	
Stumpel, Jozef	Slovakia	C	2005–2008	199	45	84	129	58	—	—	—	—	—	
Sturm, Marco	Germany	LW	2011–2012	42	3	2	5	23	7	0	0	0	4	
Sturm, Nico^{†}	Germany	C	2024–2025	15	0	1	1	7	8	0	0	0	0	
Sulzer, Alexander	Germany	D	2010–2011	9	0	1	1	0	—	—	—	—	—	
Svehla, Robert	Slovakia	D	1994–2002	573	61	229	290	603	31	1	11	12	40	
Svensson, Magnus	Sweden	D	1994–1996	46	4	14	18	31	—	—	—	—	—	
Taffe, Jeff	United States	C	2009–2010	21	1	1	2	4	—	—	—	—	—	
Tarasenko, Vladimir^{†}	Russia	D	2023–2024	19	6	8	14	0	24	5	4	9	2	SC 2024
Tarnasky, Nick	Canada	LW	2008–2010	65	2	7	9	118	—	—	—	—	—	
Taticek, Petr	Czech Republic	C	2005–2006	3	0	0	0	0	—	—	—	—	—	2002 First-round draft pick
Tetarenko, Joey	Canada	RW	2000–2003	69	4	1	5	171	—	—	—	—	—	
Thomas, Bill	United States	RW	2010–2012	31	5	3	8	6	—	—	—	—	—	
Thompson, Paul	Canada	RW	2016–2017	21	0	3	3	22	—	—	—	—	—	
Thompson, Rocky	Canada	RW	2000–2002	10	0	0	0	31	—	—	—	—	—	
Thornton, Joe	Canada	C	2021–2022	34	5	5	10	10	1	0	0	0	0	
Thornton, Shawn	Canada	RW	2014–2017	146	4	10	14	197	4	0	0	0	2	
Tierney, Chris	Canada	C	2022–2023	13	2	1	3	2	—	—	—	—	—	
Tikkanen, Esa	Finland	LW	1997–1998	28	1	8	9	16	—	—	—	——	—	
Timmins, Scott	Canada	C	2010–2013	24	1	0	1	12	—	—	—	——	—	
Tippett, Owen	Canada	RW	2017–2022	94	14	19	33	16	6	1	3	4	0	2017 First-round draft pick
Tkachuk, Matthew^{†}*	United States	W	2022–2026	242	101	187	288	313	67	25	44	69	138	SC 2024 2025
Tomlinson, Dave	Canada	C	1994–1995	5	0	0	0	0	—	—	—	—	—	
Toms, Jeff	Canada	LW	2002–2003	8	2	2	4	4	—	—	—	—	—	
Toninato, Dominic	United States	D	2019–2020	46	4	7	11	37	3	0	0	0	0	
Trnka, Pavel	Czech Republic	D	2002–2004	89	3	16	19	75	—	—	—	—	—	
Trocheck, Vincent	United States	C	2012–2020	420	111	171	282	258	2	0	1	1	0	
Ulanov, Igor	Russia	D	2001–2003	70	1	5	6	50	—	—	—	—	—	
Upshall, Scottie	Canada	LW	2011–2015	192	29	33	62	155	7	1	2	3	4	
Valk, Curtis	Canada	LW	2017–2018	1	0	0	0	0	—	—	—	—	—	
Van Impe, Darren	Canada	D	2001–2002	36	1	6	7	31	—	—	—	—	—	
Van Ryn, Mike	Canada	D	2003–2008	257	25	80	105	220	—	—	—	—	—	
Vasiljevs, Herberts	Latvia	RW	1998–1999	5	0	0	0	2	—	—	—	—	—	
Vatrano, Frank	United States	LW	2017–2022	271	73	53	126	122	8	1	1	2	6	
Versteeg, Kris	Canada	C	2011–2014	99	27	38	65	66	7	3	2	5	8	
Verhaeghe, Carter^{†}*	Canada	C	2020–2026	436	163	181	344	239	84	33	44	77	40	SC 2024 2025
Vilmanis, Sandis*	Latvia	LW	2025–2026	19	3	2	5	4	—	—	—	—	—	
Vrbata, Radim	Czech Republic	RW	2017–2018	42	5	9	14	16	—	—	—	—	—	
Wallmark, Lucas	Sweden	C	2019–2021	11	1	1	2	0	2	0	0	0	2	
Ward, Lance	Canada	D	2000–2003	134	4	7	11	254	—	—	—	—	—	
Ware, Jeff	Canada	D	1998–1999	6	0	1	1	6	—	—	—	—	—	
Warrener, Rhett	Canada	D	1995–1999	217	4	23	27	297	26	0	3	3	10	
Washburn, Steve	Canada	D	1995–1999	81	14	15	29	40	1	0	1	1	0	
Weaver, Mike	Canada	D	2010–2014	246	3	41	44	79	7	1	0	1	0	
Weegar, MacKenzie	Canada	D	2016–2022	306	27	94	121	259	20	1	4	5	20	
Weiss, Stephen	Canada	C	2002–2013	654	145	249	394	313	7	3	2	5	6	2001 First-round draft pick
Wennberg, Alexander	Sweden	C	2020–2021	56	17	12	29	8	6	1	1	2	0	
Welch, Noah	United States	D	2006–2009	29	2	1	3	20	—	—	—	—	—	
Wells, Chris	Canada	C	1996–2000	141	7	18	25	134	3	0	0	0	0	
White, Colin	United States	C	2022–2023	68	8	7	15	12	21	0	2	2	6	
Whitney, Ray	Canada	LW	1997–2001	273	97	130	227	109	4	1	0	1	4	
Whitney, Ryan	United States	D	2013–2014	7	0	0	0	6	—	—	—	—	—	
Wideman, Chris	United States	D	2018–2019	1	0	0	0	2	—	—	—	—	—	
Wideman, Dennis	Canada	D	2010–2011	61	9	24	33	33	—	—	—	—	—	
Wiemer, Jason	Canada	C	2001–2002	70	11	20	31	178	—	—	—	—	—	
Wilson, Clay	United States	D	2009–2011	17	3	2	5	6	—	—	—	—	—	
Wilson, Garrett	Canada	LW	2013–2016	34	0	0	0	24	6	0	1	1	4	
Wilson, Mike	Canada	D	1998–2001	83	4	17	21	60	4	0	0	0	0	
Winchester, Jesse	Canada	C	2013–2014	52	9	9	18	38	—	—	—	—	—	
Wolski, Wojtek	Canada	LW	2011–2012	22	4	5	9	0	2	0	0	0	4	
Woolley, Jason	Canada	D	1994–1997	89	10	37	47	52	13	2	6	8	14	
Worrell, Peter	Canada	LW	1997–2003	342	16	26	42	1,375	4	1	0	1	8	
Yakubov, Mikhail	Russia	C	2005–2006	13	0	1	1	4	—	—	—	—	—	
Yandle, Keith	United States	D	2016–2021	371	30	201	231	182	7	0	5	5	0	
Yonkman, Nolan	Canada	D	2011–2014	8	0	0	0	11	—	—	—	—	—	
Yushkevich, Dmitri	Russia	D	2002–2003	23	1	6	7	14	—	—	—	—	—	
Zednik, Richard	Slovakia	D	2007–2009	124	32	27	59	89	—	—	—	—	—	

== Notes ==
a: As of the 2005–2006 NHL season, all games have a winner; teams losing in overtime and shootouts are awarded one point thus the OTL stat replacees the tie statistic. The OTL column also includes SOL (Shootout losses).
