= Mareks =

- Gender: Male
- Name day: 30 June

Origin
- Origin: Variant form of Markuss
- Region of origin: Latvia

Other names
- Related names: Marek

Mareks is a Latvian masculine given name and may refer to:

- Mareks Ārents (born 1986), Latvian track and field athlete
- Mareks Jurevičus (born 1985), Latvian basketball player
- Mareks Mejeris (born 1991), Latvian basketball player
- Mareks Segliņš (born 1970), Latvian politician and lawyer
