= Edgel Groves =

American singer-songwriter

Edgel Groves is a recording artist/singer-songwriter who recorded the hit single "Footprints in the Sand" based on the anonymous poem of the same name in 1981. The song sold millions of copies and the record was No. 1 in "country music" and was a cross over hit and became No. 1 in Christian and country gospel. It was also voted the number one requested song of 1981 by American radio DJs. His number one hit is credited with making the poem famous.

== Music career ==
Groves started playing the mandolin and singing at the age of 4 in his Father's church and country and bluegrass with his brother Kenny (Kenny was one of Ohio's bluegrass mandolin champions). He started writing his own songs at the age of 8 and won many local/regional talent contests and started recording at age 13. He did demo/dub work for RCA A&R Director, Darol Rice, in Hollywood at 17. He won a talent contest at Travis AF Base (Fairfield, California) to appear on Ed Sullivan. A producer/artist/songwriter at Coast Recorders in San Francisco signed him. He had some regional hits and shared the studio with Sylvester Stewart, Sly and the Family Stone, Joe Simon and Cornelius Bumpus (Corny and the Corvettes) later with the Doobie Brothers.

A & R for Tiretown Records in Akron, Ohio signed him. He had a regional hit with "Five More Miles To Christmas" (BMI Songs of American Int'l Music) also written by Edgel Groves. Producer/Artist/Songwriter for Lowery Music/Southern Tracks Records in Atlanta, Georgia. He had some Top 40 Regional Hits and had an 8-piece show band and toured extensively, Lowery's stable of artists included, Billy Joe Royal, Tommy Roe, The Atlanta Rhythm Section, Joe South, Dennis Yost & the Classics IV, Ray Stevens, Jerry Reed, Bertie Higgins, Ray Whitley and Edgel Groves. He had two National TV Music Specials on TBS produced by R.T. Wiliams/Head of Turner productions for 16 years and also did on camera, commercial work for them. He was original Artist of the No. 1 Country Mega Hit, "Footprints in the Sand". Also crossed over to become No. 1 in Christian and Gospel on a worldwide basis. Was the most requested song on radio in 1981. Edgel Groves was the original singer to record "Footprints in the Sand" and the only singer to have it as a hit in the music charts.

He was inducted into the Atlanta Music Hall of Fame. He still writes and produces at Real 2 Reel Studios in Jonesboro, Georgia for independent artists and himself. Real2 Reel Studios is the home of Collective Soul, Kansas and other major artists. Also appearing on TV, Channel 57 in Atlanta and producing some TV pilots to promote artist in, around and coming through Atlanta.
