= Michal Straka =

Czech ice hockey centre

- Born: April 20, 1971 (age 55)
- Height: 5 ft 10 in (178 cm)
- Weight: 174 lb (79 kg; 12 st 6 lb)
- Position: Centre
- Shot: Left
- Played for: HC Plzeň; HC Bílí Tygři Liberec; HC Znojemští Orli; Lukko; HC Karlovy Vary; MsHK Žilina
- National team: Czech Republic
- Playing career: 1989–2010

Michal Straka (born April 20, 1971) is a Czech former professional ice hockey centre. He is the older brother of former NHL player Martin Straka.

Straka played in the Czechoslovak First Ice Hockey League and the Czech Extraliga for HC Plzeň, HC Bílí Tygři Liberec, HC Znojemští Orli and HC Karlovy Vary. He also played in the SM-liiga for Lukko and the Tipsport Liga for MsHK Žilina.
