= Footprints in the Sand (Edgel Groves song) =

Single by Edgel Groves
- A-side: "Footprints in the Sand"
- B-side: instrumental version; narrated by Johnny Dark
- Label: Silver Star Records
- Songwriter(s): Jerry Buckner and Gary Garcia

"Footprints in the Sand" is a 1980 song by Edgel Groves based on the anonymous poem Footprints in the Sand. The song, which became a one hit wonder for Groves, was written by Jerry Buckner and Gary Garcia of Buckner & Garcia. The song begins with female chorus "Footprints in the sand, he held me in his hand, and gave me strength to face the coming day,...", then enters into Groves' reading of the poem "Last night I had a dream..." The B-side is an instrumental version of the song with narration of the poem by disc jockey Johnny Dark.

The song has no relation to a 1961 song "Footprints In The Sand" written by Gwynn Elias & Irving Reid which was recorded by Garry Mills, which begins "I was to meet my baby", and then by The Marcels with the refrain "I saw those footprints in the sand, of a woman and a man.".
