= Footprints in the Sand (TV series) =

- 足印
- Genre: Period Drama
- Directed by: Sam Au; David Lau
- Country of origin: Malaysia
- Original language: Chinese
- No. of episodes: 30

Production
- Producer: Double Vision Sdn Bhd
- Running time: 60 minutes (approx.)

Original release
- Network: ntv7
- Release: 19 April – 8 June 2011

Footprints in the Sand 《足印》 is a Malaysian television series co-produced by Double Vision and ntv7. It is aired every Monday to Thursday, at 10:00pm on Malaysia's ntv7. This drama started airing on 19 April 2011 on the Malaysian channel.

== Cast ==
Cast	Character
Yenn Teoh; Mayjune Tan; Crystal Lee	Yan Li
James Wong; Vinx Lim	Fang Tong Guo
Eric Chen; Monday Kang; James Ng	Yan Yi Ren
Ernest Chong	Dai Jing Zhou
Wang Jun	Dai Sheng
Alice Yap; Robin Luo	You Shu Xin
Leslie Chai	Jie Shi
Elvis Chin	Jie Fei
Candy Ice	Dai Pei Yao
Jordan Voon	
Seck Fook Yee	Tang Yu Mei
Frederick Lee (Malaysian actor)	
