= Dalibor Kusovský =

Slovak ice hockey player

- Born: September 25, 1971 (age 54) Trenčín, Czechoslovakia
- Height: 5 ft 9 in (175 cm)
- Weight: 185 lb (84 kg; 13 st 3 lb)
- Position: Defense
- Shot: Right
- Played for: HK Dukla Trenčín; HK 32 Liptovský Mikuláš; MsHK Žilina; HC Slovan Bratislava
- NHL draft: Undrafted
- Playing career: 1991–2009

Dalibor Kusovský is a Slovak professional ice hockey player who played with HC Slovan Bratislava in the Slovak Extraliga.

== Career statistics ==
			Regular season					Playoffs
Season	Team	League	GP	G	A	Pts	PIM	GP	G	A	Pts	PIM
1991–92	HK Dukla Trenčín	Czech	1	0	0	0	0	—	—	—	—	—
1992–93	HK Dukla Trenčín	Czech	34	2	3	5	—	—	—	—	—	—
1993–94	HK Dukla Trencin	Slovak	43	1	1	2	—	—	—	—	—	—
1994–95	HK Dukla Trenčín	Slovak	25	3	0	3	8	9	0	1	1	12
1995–96	HK Dukla Trenčín	Slovak	38	2	6	8	18	—	—	—	—	—
1996–97	HK Dukla Trenčín	Slovak	49	3	9	12	40	—	—	—	—	—
1997–98	HK Dukla Trenčín	Slovak	35	4	9	13	40	—	—	—	—	—
1998–99	HK Dukla Trenčín	Slovak	25	2	3	5	20	—	—	—	—	—
1999–00	HK 32 Liptovský Mikuláš	Slovak	44	4	12	16	18	—	—	—	—	—
2000–01	MsHK Žilina	Slovak 2	38	3	12	15	28	—	—	—	—	—
2001–02	MsHK Žilina	Slovak	54	3	14	17	26	—	—	—	—	—
2002–03	MsHK Žilina	Slovak	54	1	14	15	66	4	0	0	0	2
2003–04	MsHK Žilina	Slovak	34	3	5	8	20	—	—	—	—	—
2004–05	MsHK Žilina	Slovak	53	2	11	13	24	5	0	0	0	2
2005–06	MsHK Žilina	Slovak	48	6	3	9	26	15	1	2	3	10
2006–07	HC Slovan Bratislava	Slovak	13	0	1	1	8	14	1	2	3	8
2006–07	MsHK Žilina	Slovak	40	2	8	10	70	—	—	—	—	—
2007–08	MsHK Žilina	Slovak	50	5	13	18	99	4	0	1	1	2
2008–09	MsHK Žilina	Slovak	55	2	7	9	34	—	—	—	—	—
Slovak totals			660	43	116	159	517	56	3	6	9	42
