= Marek Potemski =

Polish physicist

Marek Potemski is a French-Polish physicist currently at LNCMI and an Elected Fellow of the American Physical Society.
