= Mikuláš Hovorka =

Czech ice hockey player (born 2001)

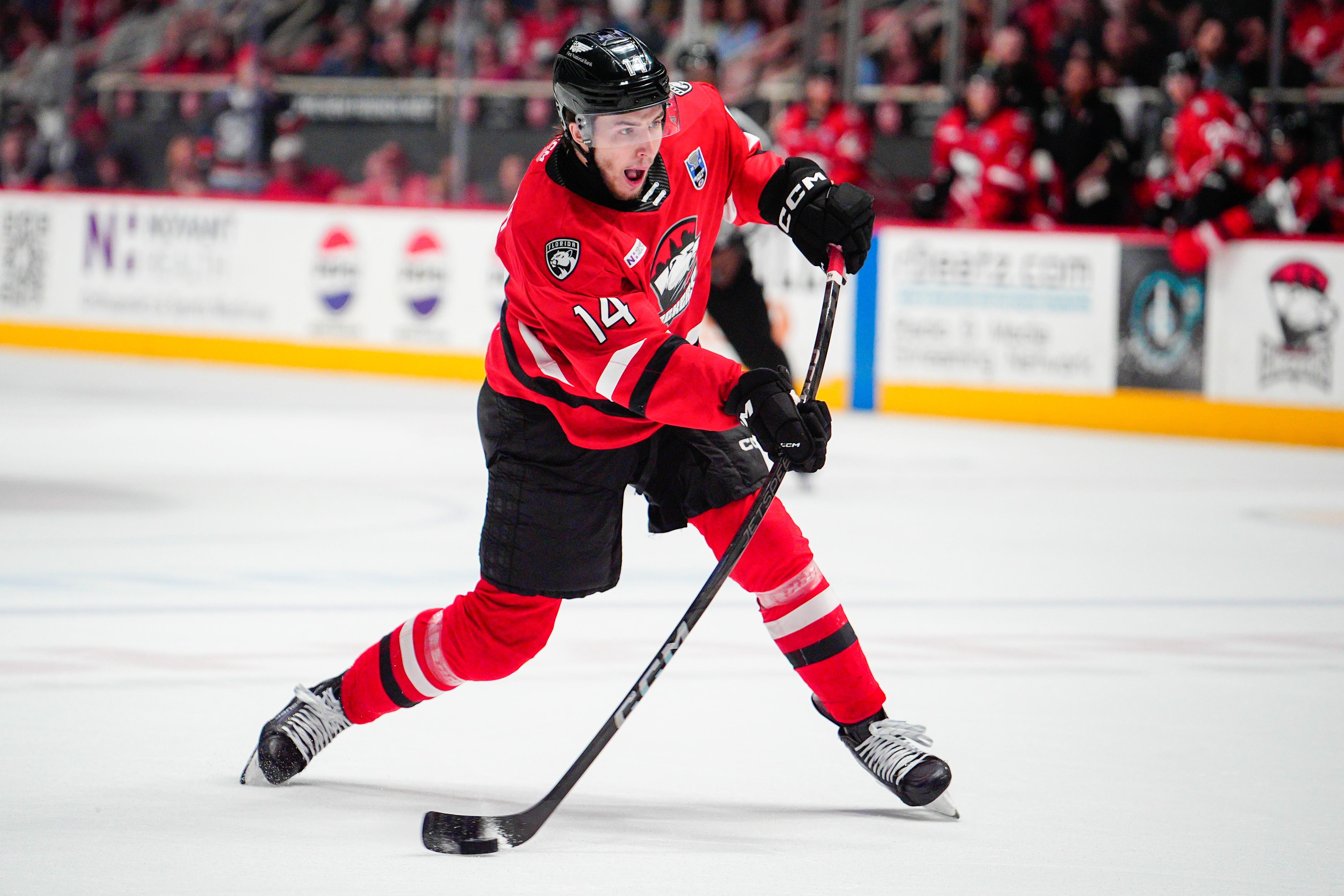
- Born: 1 July 2001 (age 25) Prague, Czech Republic
- Height: 6 ft 6 in (198 cm)
- Weight: 229 lb (104 kg; 16 st 5 lb)
- Position: Defence
- Shoots: Right
- NHL team (P) Cur. team Former teams: Florida Panthers; Charlotte Checkers (AHL); Motor České Budějovice
- NHL draft: Undrafted
- Playing career: 2019–present

Mikuláš Hovorka (born 1 July 2001) is a Czech professional ice hockey player who is a defenceman for the Charlotte Checkers of the American Hockey League (AHL) while under contract to the Florida Panthers of the National Hockey League (NHL).

== Early life ==
Mikuláš Hovorka was born on 1 July 2001, in Prague, Czech Republic. He grew up playing ice hockey in his hometown and developed into a large, right‑handed defenceman, standing 6 ft 6 in and weighing 229 lb.

== Playing career ==
Hovorka started his professional career with Motor České Budějovice in the Czech Extraliga. Over two seasons from 2022 to 2024 he played in 90 games, scoring 8 goals and 14 assists, and became known as a promising young defenceman. In April 2024, Hovorka signed a two‑year entry-level contract with the Florida Panthers of the NHL. He was assigned to the Charlotte Checkers, the Panthers AHL affiliate, where he adjusted to the North American style of play and contributed on both offense and defence. Hovorka was called up to the Florida Panthers in February 2026 and made his NHL debut that month.

== Career statistics ==
			Regular season					Playoffs
Season	Team	League	GP	G	A	Pts	PIM	GP	G	A	Pts	PIM
2016–17	HC Slavia Praha	CZE U18	2	0	0	0	0	—	—	—	—	—
2017–18	BK Mladá Boleslav	CZE U18	29	3	6	9	22	—	—	—	—	—
2018–19	BK Mladá Boleslav	CZE U19	47	7	10	17	50	—	—	—	—	—
2019–20	HC Slavia Praha	Czech.1	10	0	1	1	6	—	—	—	—	—
2020–21	HC Slavia Praha	CZE U20	13	5	6	11	28	—	—	—	—	—
2020–21	HC Slavia Praha	Czech.1	4	0	0	0	0	—	—	—	—	—
2021–22	HC Slavia Praha	Czech.1	42	6	12	18	4	8	0	2	2	8
2022–23	Motor České Budějovice	ELH	39	3	3	6	24	—	—	—	—	—
2023–24	Motor České Budějovice	ELH	51	5	11	16	42	3	0	2	2	4
2024–25	Charlotte Checkers	AHL	60	3	7	10	33	18	0	5	5	32
2025–26	Charlotte Checkers	AHL	57	5	13	18	46	3	0	0	0	2
2025–26	Florida Panthers	NHL	4	0	1	1	0	—	—	—	—	—
ELH totals			90	8	14	22	66	3	0	2	2	4
NHL totals			4	0	1	1	0	—	—	—	—	—
