= Marek Černošek =

Czech ice hockey player

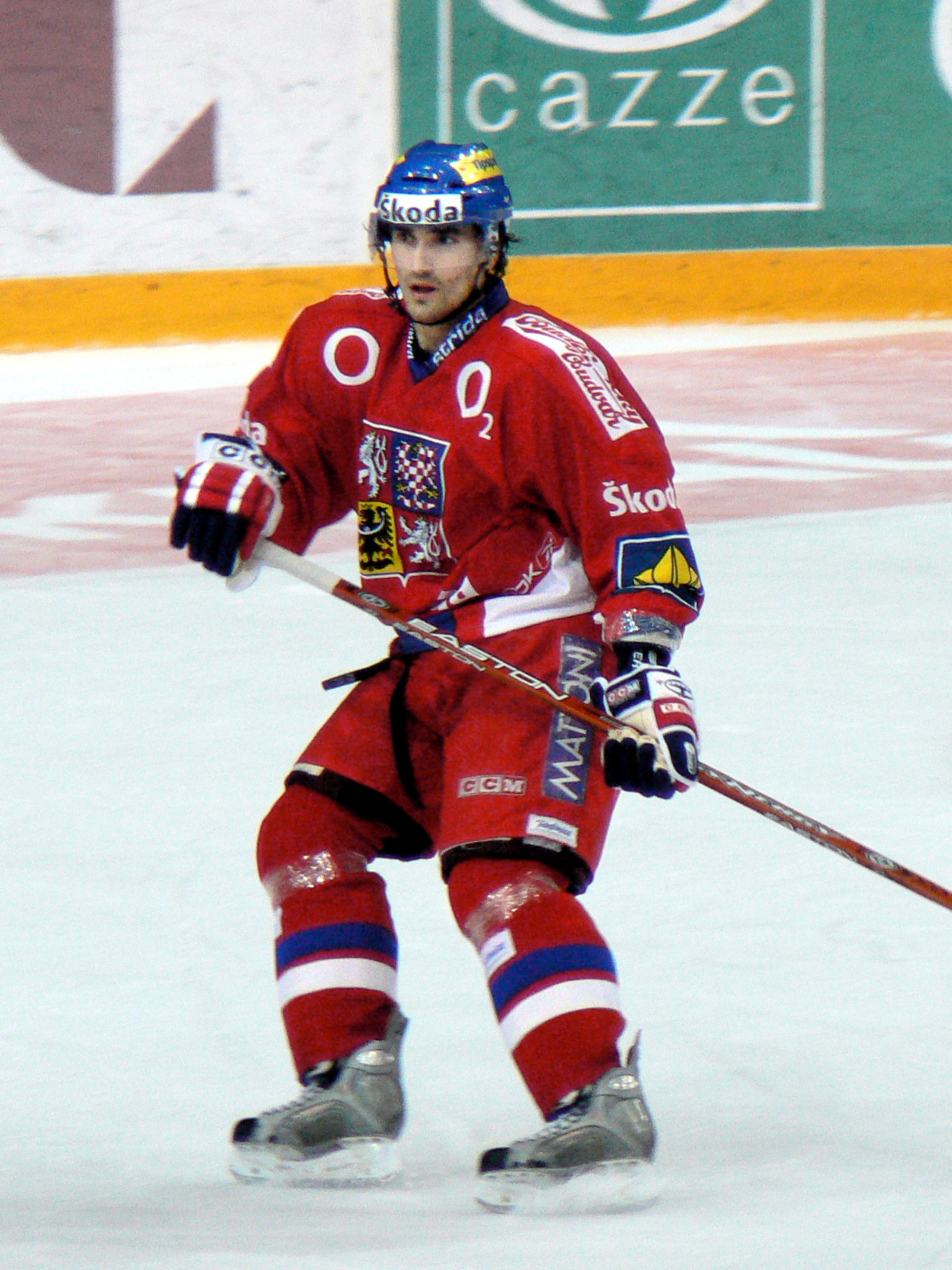
- Born: 22 July 1976 (age 50) Prostějov, Czechoslovakia
- Height: 5 ft 11 in (180 cm)
- Weight: 198 lb (90 kg; 14 st 2 lb)
- Position: Centre
- Shot: Left
- Played for: LHK Jestřábi Prostějov; HC Olomouc; HC Karlovy Vary; HC Plzen; HC Litvinov; HC Havirov; HC Sparta Praha; Rytiri Kladno; HC Berounsti Medvedi
- National team: Czech Republic
- Playing career: 1993–2014

Marek Černošek (born 22 July 1976 in Prostějov, Czechoslovakia) is a Czech professional ice hockey forward. He has played for various clubs in the Czech Extraliga and Czech First League, also he has appeared for the national team, recently in 2008 LG Hockey Games. He won Czech Extraliga in 2006 with Sparta Praha.

== Career statistics ==
			Regular season					Playoffs
Season	Team	League	GP	G	A	Pts	PIM	GP	G	A	Pts	PIM
1993–94	IHC Prostejov	Czech2	—	0	1	1	—	—	—	—	—	—
1994–95	IHC Prostejov	Czech2	—	1	4	5	—	—	—	—	—	—
1995–96	IHL Prostejov	Czech2	43	2	9	11	—	—	—	—	—	—
1996–97	HC Olomouc	Czech	38	1	0	1	6	—	—	—	—	—
1997–98	HC Becherovka Karlovy Vary	Czech	41	0	4	4	23	—	—	—	—	—
1998–99	HC Becherovka Karlovy Vary	Czech	40	2	4	6	18	—	—	—	—	—
1999–00	HC Keramika Plzeň	Czech	18	0	1	1	18	—	—	—	—	—
1999–00	HC Chemopetrol Litvínov	Czech	26	1	9	10	57	7	0	0	0	4
2000–01	HC Chemopetrol Litvínov	Czech	41	3	2	5	14	4	0	0	0	0
2001–02	HC Havirov Panthers	Czech	51	1	10	11	75	—	—	—	—	—
2002–03	HC Vitkovice	Czech	49	4	13	17	30	6	1	2	3	6
2003–04	HC Vitkovice	Czech	50	1	8	9	55	6	0	2	2	2
2004–05	HC Vitkovice	Czech	32	2	4	6	20	13	3	4	7	8
2005–06	HC Vitkovice Steel	Czech	5	0	0	0	0	—	—	—	—	—
2005–06	HC Sparta Praha	Czech	44	4	7	11	22	17	2	3	5	12
2006–07	HC Sparta Praha	Czech	51	1	6	7	84	15	0	2	2	22
2007–08	HC Sparta Praha	Czech	44	3	4	7	74	4	0	0	0	4
2008–09	HC Sparta Praha	Czech	41	4	3	7	62	11	0	0	0	16
2009–10	HC Sparta Praha	Czech	33	0	2	2	26	—	—	—	—	—
2009–10	HC BENZINA Litvínov	Czech	—	—	—	—	—	5	0	0	0	2
2010–11	HC BENZINA Litvínov	Czech	48	4	12	16	52	6	0	0	0	2
2011–12	HC Litvínov	Czech	42	3	1	4	42	—	—	—	—	—
2012–13	Rytíři Kladno	Czech	47	2	7	9	32	9	0	1	1	14
2013–14	Rytíři Kladno	Czech	29	1	3	4	18	—	—	—	—	—
2013–14	HC Berounsti Medvedi	Czech2	1	0	0	0	0	—	—	—	—	—
Czech totals			770	37	100	137	728	119	7	17	24	102
