= Marek Jastrzębiec-Mosakowski =

Polish author (born 1962)

Marek Jastrzębiec-Mosakowski (born 1962) is a Polish author. He became well known in the mid-1990s through his East Prussian historical novel Ślady na piasku (Footprints in the Sand, 1994). He also wrote the epistolary novel Pory roku (1996).

Jastrzebiec-Mosakowski's Footprints in the Sand (Slady na piasku, 1994) and Four Seasons (Pory roku, 1996) are set in eastern Prussia and include homoerotic motifs. The books intermingle questions of sexual and national identities.
