= Marek Hovorka (footballer) =

Czech footballer

Personal information
- Date of birth: 24 October 1991 (age 35)
- Place of birth: Czechoslovakia
- Height: 1.82 m (6 ft 0 in)
- Position: Midfielder

Team information
- Current team: Ústí nad Labem
- Number: 13

Senior career*
Years	Team	Apps	(Gls)
2010–	Jablonec	1	(0)
2012	→ České Budějovice (loan)	1	(0)
2012–	→ Ústí nad Labem (loan)	6	(1)

International career^{‡}
2008–2009	Czech Republic U18	7	(1)
2009–2010	Czech Republic U19	3	(0)
- * Club domestic league appearances and goals as of 26 October 2012 ‡ National team caps and goals as of 31 December 2011

Marek Hovorka (born 24 October 1991) is a professional Czech football player who currently plays for FK Ústí nad Labem. He has represented his country at youth level.
