= 2012–13 HC Slovan Bratislava season =

2012–13 HC Slovan Bratislava
- Division: 3rd Bobrov
- Conference: 6th Western
- 2012–13 record: 17–11–5–19
- Home record: 10–6–2–8
- Road record: 7–5–3–11
- Goals for: 124
- Goals against: 127

Team information
- General manager: Maroš Krajči
- Coach: Rostislav Čada
- Assistant coach: Roman Stantien
- Captain: Miroslav Šatan (Sep–Nov) (Slovakia) Ján Lipiansky (Nov–Feb)
- Arena: Ondrej Nepela Arena
- Average attendance: 9,977 (99.22%)

Team leaders
- Goals: (Slovakia) Libor Hudáček (11)
- Assists: (Slovakia) Michel Miklík (15)
- Points: (Slovakia) Michel Miklík (24)
- Penalty minutes: (Slovakia) Martin Štajnoch (47)
- Plus/minus: (+) (Slovakia) Marko Daňo (+4) (−) (Slovakia) Libor Hudáček (−13)
- Wins: (Slovakia) Jaroslav Janus (18)
- Goals against average: (Slovakia) Jaroslav Janus (2.17)

The 2012–13 HC Slovan Bratislava season was the first season for Bratislava based club in Kontinental Hockey League.

Slovan opened the 2012–13 season with a home game against Ukrainian HC Donbass on 6 September 2012, losing 2–4 in front of a capacity crowd. The first win was achieved 4 days later by defeating Spartak Moscow 2–1 after shootout. During the NHL lockout between September 2012 and January 2013, two defenders Ľubomír Višňovský and Andrej Sekera enhanced the team. Slovan ended the season with 78 points as 6th of the Western conference and thus clinched the play-off in their first KHL season. In the first play-off round Slovan played against Dynamo Moscow and lost all four matches.

During the regular season, Slovan had sold out 25 out of its 26 home games with an average attendance of 9,977 spectators which was the 7th highest average attendance in Europe.

== Schedule and results ==
=== Pre-season ===
Pre-season took part in July, August and September with 2 friendly matches and participating European Trophy.

2012–13 Game Log
Pre-season: 2–0–0–0 (Home: 2–0–0–0; Road: 0–0–0–0)

#	Date	Home team	Score	Away team	Arena	Attendance	Recap
1	24 July	Slovan Bratislava	2–1	SKA Saint Petersburg (Russia)	Slovnaft Arena	7,603	Slovan začal prípravu pred KHL víťazstvom nad Petrohradom - Šport - Šport - Webnoviny.sk
2	4 August	Slovan Bratislava	3–1	Spartak Moscow (Russia)	Slovnaft Arena	8,765	Slovan v príprave úspešný, zdolal Spartak Moskva

European Trophy: 1–3–1–3 (Home: 1–2–0–1; Road: 0–1–1–2) Pts. 10

#	Date	Home team	Score	Away team	Arena	Attendance	Record	Recap
1	31 July	(Czech Republic) Piráti Chomutov	5 – 6 SO	Slovan Bratislava	SD Aréna	3,082	0–1–0–0	Europe's premium club competition]
2	10 August	Slovan Bratislava	2 – 1 SO	Vienna Capitals (Austria)	Slovnaft Arena	6,097	0–2–0–0	Europe's premium club competition]
3	14 August	Slovan Bratislava	3–5	Sparta Praha (Czech Republic)	Slovnaft Arena	8,843	0–2–0–1	Europe's premium club competition]
4	17 August	(Sweden) Linköpings	4–2	Slovan Bratislava	Cloetta Center	3,149	0–2–0–2	Europe's premium club competition]
5	19 August	(Sweden) HV71	2–0	Slovan Bratislava	Kinnarps Arena	2,249	0–2–0–3	Europe's premium club competition]
6	24 August	Slovan Bratislava	5–0	JYP Jyväskylä (Finland)	Slovnaft Arena	6,853	1–2–0–3	Europe's premium club competition]
7	26 August	Slovan Bratislava	3 – 2 OT	KalPa (Finland)	Slovnaft Arena	6,849	1–3–0–3	Europe's premium club competition]
8	31 August	(Austria) Vienna Capitals	2 – 1 OT	Slovan Bratislava	Albert-Schultz Eishalle	4,300	1–3–1–3	Europe's premium club competition]

Win (3 points) Overtime/shootout win (2 points) Overtime/shootout loss (1 point) Loss (0 points)

=== Regular season ===
2012–13 Game Log
September: 4–2–1–3 (Home: 3–2–1–1; Road: 1–0–0–2) Pts. 17

#	Date	Home team	Score	Away team	Arena	Attendance	Record	Recap
1	6	Slovan Bratislava	2–4	Donbass Donetsk (Ukraine)	Slovnaft Arena	10,055	0–0–0–1	Livescores - Soccer - Scoresway
2	8	Slovan Bratislava	2 – 3 SO	Dinamo Riga (Latvia)	Slovnaft Arena	8,034	0–0–1–1	Livescores - Soccer - Scoresway
3	10	Slovan Bratislava	2 – 1 SO	Spartak Moscow	Slovnaft Arena	10,055	0–1–1–1	Livescores - Soccer - Scoresway
4	13	(Belarus) Dinamo Minsk	4–3	Slovan Bratislava	Minsk-Arena	15,005	0–1–1–2	Livescores - Soccer - Scoresway
5	15	Vityaz Chekhov	0–3	Slovan Bratislava	Ice Hockey Center 2004	2,900	1–1–1–2	Livescores - Soccer - Scoresway
6	17	Slovan Bratislava	4–2	SKA Saint Petersburg	Slovnaft Arena	10,055	2–1–1–2	Livescores - Soccer - Scoresway
7	22	Slovan Bratislava	4–2	Avangard Omsk	Slovnaft Arena	10,055	3–1–1–2	Livescores - Soccer - Scoresway
8	24	Slovan Bratislava	4–2	Barys Astana (Kazakhstan)	Slovnaft Arena	10,055	4–1–1–2	Livescores - Soccer - Scoresway
9	26	Slovan Bratislava	4 – 3 SO	Yugra Khanty-Mansiysk	Slovnaft Arena	10,055	4–2–1–2	Livescores - Soccer - Scoresway
10	29	Metallurg Magnitogorsk	3–2	Slovan Bratislava	Magnitogorsk Arena	6,357	4–2–1–3	Livescores - Soccer - Scoresway

October: 3–2–1–5 (Home: 2–0–0–3; Road: 1–2–1–2) Pts. 14

#	Date	Home team	Score	Away team	Arena	Attendance	Record	Recap
11	1	Traktor Chelyabinsk	3–1	Slovan Bratislava	Traktor Sport Palace	7,500	4–2–1–4	Livescores - Soccer - Scoresway
12	3	Avtomobilist Yekaterinburg	0–1	Slovan Bratislava	KRK Uralets	3,000	5–2–1–4	Livescores - Soccer - Scoresway
13	7	Slovan Bratislava	2–3	Dynamo Moscow	Slovnaft Arena	10,055	5–2–1–5	Livescores - Soccer - Scoresway
14	11	Neftekhimik Nizhnekamsk	4 – 5 SO	Slovan Bratislava	SCC Arena	4,500	5–3–1–5	Livescores - Soccer - Scoresway
15	13	Salavat Yulaev Ufa	3 – 2 SO	Slovan Bratislava	Ufa Arena	6,250	5–3–2–5	Livescores - Soccer - Scoresway
16	15	Ak Bars Kazan	2 – 3 SO	Slovan Bratislava	TatNeft Arena	3,090	5–4–2–5	Livescores - Soccer - Scoresway
17	17	Severstal Cherepovets	6–0	Slovan Bratislava	Ice Palace	3,193	5–4–2–6	Livescores - Soccer - Scoresway
18	23	Slovan Bratislava	2–3	CSKA Moscow	Slovnaft Arena	10,055	5–4–2–7	Livescores - Soccer - Scoresway
19	27	Slovan Bratislava	2–4	Metallurg Novokuznetsk	Slovnaft Arena	10,055	5–4–2–8	Livescores - Soccer - Scoresway
20	29	Slovan Bratislava	4–2	Amur Khabarovsk	Slovnaft Arena	10,055	6–4–2–8	Livescores - Soccer - Scoresway
21	30	Slovan Bratislava	6–2	Sibir Novosibirsk	Slovnaft Arena	10,055	7–4–2–8	Livescores - Soccer - Scoresway

November: 5–0–1–3 (Home: 2–0–0–1; Road: 3–0–1–2) Pts. 16

#	Date	Home team	Score	Away team	Arena	Attendance	Record	Recap
22	3	(Czech Republic) Lev Praha	1–2	Slovan Bratislava	Tipsport Arena	12,885	8–4–2–8	Livescores - Soccer - Scoresway
23	14	Lokomotiv Yaroslavl	4–0	Slovan Bratislava	Arena 2000	8,777	8–4–2–9	Livescores - Soccer - Scoresway
24	16	Atlant Mytishchi	0–2	Slovan Bratislava	Mytishchi Arena	5,750	9–4–2–9	Livescores - Soccer - Scoresway
25	18	Torpedo Nizhny Novgorod	3 – 2 SO	Slovan Bratislava	Trade Union Sport Palace	5,300	9–4–3–9	Livescores - Soccer - Scoresway
26	21	Slovan Bratislava	1–4	Torpedo Nizhny Novgorod	Slovnaft Arena	10,055	9–4–3–10	Livescores - Soccer - Scoresway
27	23	Slovan Bratislava	3–2	Atlant Mytishchi	Slovnaft Arena	10,055	10–4–3–10	Livescores - Soccer - Scoresway
28	25	Slovan Bratislava	3–2	Lokomotiv Yaroslavl	Slovnaft Arena	10,055	11–4–3–10	Livescores - Soccer - Scoresway
29	28	Amur Khabarovsk	3–0	Slovan Bratislava	Platinum Arena	7,100	11–4–3–11	Livescores - Soccer - Scoresway
30	30	Sibir Novosibirsk	1–2	Slovan Bratislava	Ice Sports Palace Sibir	5,000	12–4–3–11	Livescores - Soccer - Scoresway

December: 1–2–2–3 (Home: 1–2–1–0; Road: 0–0–1–3) Pts. 9

#	Date	Home team	Score	Away team	Arena	Attendance	Record	Recap
31	2	Metallurg Novokuznetsk	3–2	Slovan Bratislava	Sports Palace	3,050	12–4–3–12	Livescores - Soccer - Scoresway
32	4	CSKA Moscow	4–1	Slovan Bratislava	CSKA Ice Palace	2,552	12–4–3–13	Livescores - Soccer - Scoresway
33	8	Slovan Bratislava	2–1	Lev Praha (Czech Republic)	Slovnaft Arena	10,055	13–4–3–13	Livescores - Soccer - Scoresway
34	19	Slovan Bratislava	1 – 0 SO	Salavat Yulaev Ufa	Slovnaft Arena	10,055	13–5–3–13	Livescores - Soccer - Scoresway
35	21	Slovan Bratislava	1 – 2 SO	Neftekhimik Nizhnekamsk	Slovnaft Arena	10,055	13–5–4–13	Livescores - Soccer - Scoresway
36	22	Slovan Bratislava	3 – 2 SO	Ak Bars Kazan	Slovnaft Arena	10,055	13–6–4–13	Livescores - Soccer - Scoresway
37	26	Dynamo Moscow	2 – 1 SO	Slovan Bratislava	Minor Arena	3,500	13–6–5–13	Livescores - Soccer - Scoresway
38	28	SKA Saint Petersburg	1–0	Slovan Bratislava	Ice Palace	11,600	13–6–5–14	Livescores - Soccer - Scoresway

January: 3–3–0–3 (Home: 1–2–0–2; Road: 2–1–0–1) Pts. 15

#	Date	Home team	Score	Away team	Arena	Attendance	Record	Recap
39	4	Slovan Bratislava	3–1	Avtomobilist Yekaterinburg	Slovnaft Arena	10,055	14–6–5–14	Livescores - Soccer - Scoresway
40	6	Slovan Bratislava	4 – 3 SO	Metallurg Magnitogorsk	Slovnaft Arena	10,055	14–7–5–14	Livescores - Soccer - Scoresway
41	8	Slovan Bratislava	4 – 3 OT	Traktor Chelyabinsk	Slovnaft Arena	10,055	14–8–5–14	Livescores - Soccer - Scoresway
42	15	(Czech Republic) Lev Praha	3–4	Slovan Bratislava	O_{2} Arena	15,543	15–8–5–14	Livescores - Soccer - Scoresway
43	18	Yugra Khanty-Mansiysk	3–1	Slovan Bratislava	Arena Ugra	2,750	15–8–5–15	Livescores - Soccer - Scoresway
44	20	Avangard Omsk	2 – 3 SO	Slovan Bratislava	Omsk Arena	9,870	15–9–5–15	Livescores - Soccer - Scoresway
45	22	(Kazakhstan) Barys Astana	2–4	Slovan Bratislava	Kazakhstan Sport Palace	2,779	16–9–5–15	Livescores - Soccer - Scoresway
46	26	Slovan Bratislava	0–3	Severstal Cherepovets	Slovnaft Arena	10,055	16–9–5–16	Livescores - Soccer - Scoresway
47	28	Slovan Bratislava	1–2	Dinamo Minsk (Belarus)	Slovnaft Arena	10,055	16–9–5–17	Livescores - Soccer - Scoresway

February: 1–2–0–2 (Home: 1–0–0–1; Road: 0–2–0–1) Pts. 7

#	Date	Home team	Score	Away team	Arena	Attendance	Record	Recap
48	1	Slovan Bratislava	3–0	Vityaz Chekhov	Slovnaft Arena	10,055	17–9–5–17	Livescores - Soccer - Scoresway
49	3	Slovan Bratislava	4–5	Lev Praha (Czech Republic)	Slovnaft Arena	10,055	17–9–5–18	Livescores - Soccer - Scoresway
50	13	Spartak Moscow	3 – 4 OT	Slovan Bratislava	LDS Sokolniki	3,274	17–10–5–18	Livescores - Soccer - Scoresway
51	15	(Ukraine) Donbass Donetsk	3 – 4 OT	Slovan Bratislava	Druzhba Arena	3,976	17–11–5–18	Livescores - Soccer - Scoresway
52	17	(Latvia) Dinamo Riga	3–1	Slovan Bratislava	Arena Riga	5,770	17–11–5–19	Livescores - Soccer - Scoresway

Win (3 points) Overtime/shootout win (2 points) Overtime/shootout loss (1 point) Loss (0 points)

=== Playoffs ===
2013 Gagarin Cup Playoffs
Western Conference Quarterfinal vs. (3) Dynamo Moscow – Dynamo won series 4–0

#	Date	Home team	Score	Away team	Arena	Attendance	Series	Recap
1	20 Feb	Dynamo Moscow	5–1	Slovan Bratislava	Minor Arena	5,212	0 – 1	Livescores - Soccer - Scoresway
2	21 Feb	Dynamo Moscow	3 – 2 OT	Slovan Bratislava	Minor Arena	5,252	0 – 2	Livescores - Soccer - Scoresway
3	24 Feb	Slovan Bratislava	2–4	Dynamo Moscow	Slovnaft Arena	9,666	0 – 3	Livescores - Soccer - Scoresway
4	25 Feb	Slovan Bratislava	2–3	Dynamo Moscow	Slovnaft Arena	10,055	0 – 4	Livescores - Soccer - Scoresway

Win Loss

== Standings ==
Source: khl.ru
After games of 17 February 2013

=== Bobrov Division ===
R		GP	W	OTW	SOW	SOL	OTL	L	GF	GA	Pts
1	(Russia) c,y – SKA Saint Petersburg	52	36	1	1	2	1	11	182	116	115
2	(Russia) Dynamo Moscow	52	27	3	6	1	1	14	150	115	101
3	(Slovakia) Slovan Bratislava	52	17	3	8	5	0	19	124	127	78
4	(Czech Republic) Lev Praha	52	23	0	1	2	3	23	132	133	76
5	(Ukraine) Donbass Donetsk	52	17	2	5	6	1	21	134	142	72
6	(Russia) Vityaz Chekhov	52	11	1	6	6	2	26	119	151	55
7	(Latvia) Dinamo Riga	52	13	2	2	2	2	31	109	151	51

=== Western Conference ===
R		Div	GP	W	OTW	SOW	SOL	OTL	L	GF	GA	Pts
1	(Russia) c,y – SKA Saint Petersburg	BOB	52	36	1	1	2	1	11	182	116	115
2	(Russia) y – CSKA Moscow	TAR	52	23	5	8	1	0	15	151	109	96
3	(Russia) Dynamo Moscow	BOB	52	27	3	6	1	1	14	150	115	101
4	(Russia) Lokomotiv Yaroslavl	TAR	52	24	2	8	0	0	18	131	121	92
5	(Russia) Severstal Cherepovets	TAR	52	21	1	6	3	5	16	137	117	85
6	(Slovakia) Slovan Bratislava	BOB	52	17	3	8	5	0	19	124	127	78
7	(Czech Republic) Lev Praha	BOB	52	23	0	1	2	3	23	132	133	76
8	(Russia) Atlant Mytishchi	TAR	52	19	1	3	4	4	21	137	141	73
9	(Ukraine) Donbass Donetsk	BOB	52	17	2	5	6	1	21	134	142	72
10	(Belarus) Dinamo Minsk	TAR	52	18	5	1	2	3	23	125	148	71
11	(Russia) Torpedo Nizhny Novgorod	TAR	52	19	0	2	4	4	23	142	146	69
12	(Russia) Vityaz Chekhov	BOB	52	11	1	6	6	2	26	119	151	55
13	(Russia) Spartak Moscow	TAR	52	11	4	2	5	2	28	106	151	52
14	(Latvia) Dinamo Riga	BOB	52	13	2	2	2	2	31	109	151	51

y – Won division; c – Won Continental Cup (best record in KHL);
BOB – Bobrov Division, TAR – Tarasov Division

== Final roster ==
As of 1 March 2013

No.	Nat	Player	Pos	S/G	Age	Acquired	Birthplace
83	(Slovakia)	Martin Bakoš	LW	R	34	2007	Spišská Nová Ves, Czechoslovakia
61	(Slovakia)	Milan Bartovič	LW	L	43	2012	Trenčín, Czechoslovakia
55	(Slovakia)	Mário Bližňák	C	L	38	2012	Trenčín, Czechoslovakia
14	(Slovakia)	Marko Daňo	RW	L	30	2012	Eisenstadt, Austria
48	(Slovakia)	Ivan Ďatelinka	D	L	42	2011	Topoľčany, Czechoslovakia
90	(Slovakia)	Libor Hudáček	C	R	34	2009	Levoča, Czechoslovakia
32	(Slovakia)	Jaroslav Janus	G	L	35	2012	Prešov, Czechoslovakia
42	(Slovakia)	Branislav Konrád	G	R	37	2008	Nitra, Czechoslovakia
23	(Slovakia)	Andrej Kudrna	LW	L	33	2011	Nové Zámky, Czechoslovakia
16	(Slovakia)	Roman Kukumberg (A)	C	R	44	2011	Bratislava, Czechoslovakia
89	(Slovakia)	Milan Kytnár	C	L	35	2012	Topoľčany, Czechoslovakia
91	(Slovakia)	Ján Lipiansky (A)	C	L	50	2008	Bratislava, Czechoslovakia
4	(Slovakia)	Patrik Luža	D	R	30	2011	Bratislava, Slovakia
56	(Slovakia)	Vladimír Mihálik	D	L	38	2012	Prešov, Czechoslovakia
19	(Slovakia)	Michel Miklík	LW	R	42	2012	Piešťany, Czechoslovakia
6	(Czech Republic)	Tomáš Mojžíš	D	R	42	2012	Piešťany, Czechoslovakia
13	(Slovakia)	Tomáš Mikúš	RW	L	31	2012	Skalica, Slovakia
25	(Slovakia)	Bruno Mráz	C	R	31	2012	Bratislava, Czechoslovakia
85	(Slovakia)	Peter Ölvecký	LW	L	39	2012	Nové Zámky, Czechoslovakia
28	(Slovakia)	Miroslav Preisinger	C	L	34	2010	Bratislava, Czechoslovakia
88	(Slovakia)	Michal Sersen	D	L	39	2012	Gelnica, Czechoslovakia
5	(Canada)	Jonathan Sigalet	D	L	39	2012	Vancouver, British Columbia
18	(Slovakia)	Miroslav Šatan (C)	C	L	50	2011	Jacovce, Czechoslovakia
3	(Slovakia)	Martin Štajnoch	D	R	34	2008	Bojnice, Czechoslovakia
59	(Slovakia)	Andrej Šťastný	C	L	34	2012	Považská Bystrica, Czechoslovakia
24	(Slovakia)	Ivan Švarný	D	L	40	2011	Nitra, Czechoslovakia
80	(Slovakia)	Ján Tabaček	D	L	44	2012	Martin, Czechoslovakia
12	(Slovakia)	Peter Trška	D	L	32	2010	Dubnica nad Váhom, Czechoslovakia
82	(Czech Republic)	Michal Vondrka	RW	L	42	2012	České Budějovice, Czechoslovakia

== Player statistics ==
Source: Eliteprospects

=== Skaters ===
Regular season
Player	GP	G	A	Pts	+/-	PIM
Michel Miklík	52	9	15	24	−7	16
Roman Kukumberg	52	10	11	21	−5	39
Libor Hudáček	48	11	9	20	−13	12
Michal Vondrka	46	9	11	20	0	18
Mário Bližňák	51	9	11	20	−5	20
Milan Bartovič	47	9	8	17	−7	20
Ľubomír Višňovský	32	6	10	16	+1	22
Ján Lipiansky	41	5	10	15	−1	37
Miroslav Šatan	21	7	5	12	+2	22
Peter Ölvecký	49	7	5	12	+1	42
Andrej Sekera	25	3	9	12	−1	8
Jonathan Sigalet	45	3	9	12	−3	24
Ján Tabaček	43	1	10	11	+2	26
Milan Kytnár	44	5	5	10	−2	34
Martin Štajnoch	36	2	8	10	−2	47
Michal Sersen	29	1	7	8	−8	18
Andrej Šťastný	33	1	7	8	+1	20
Ivan Švarný	44	1	7	8	−3	26
Martin Bakoš	24	3	4	7	+3	10
Tomáš Mikúš	34	3	4	7	+3	4
Marko Daňo	37	3	4	7	+4	26
Tomáš Mojžíš	11	1	5	6	+2	12
Juraj Mikúš	4	2	2	4	+2	8
Vladimír Dravecký	24	1	3	4	−1	10
Vladimír Mihálik	15	2	0	2	−4	14
Ivan Ďatelinka	16	0	2	2	+2	6
Josef Boumedienne	17	0	2	2	+3	18
Marek Svatoš	6	1	0	1	−1	4
Andrej Kudrna	13	1	0	1	+2	2
Peter Trška	1	0	0	0	0	0
David Printz	1	0	0	0	−1	2
Partik Luža	2	0	0	0	−1	0
Miroslav Preisinger	15	0	0	0	−3	2

Playoffs
Player	GP	G	A	Pts	+/-	PIM
Mário Bližňák	4	2	0	2	−2	0
Michal Vondrka	4	1	1	2	−4	0
Michel Miklík	4	0	2	2	−3	0
Libor Hudáček	4	0	2	2	−2	0
Milan Kytnár	3	1	0	1	+1	8
Ivan Švarný	3	1	0	1	−2	4
Roman Kukumberg	4	1	0	1	−4	2
Vladimír Mihálik	4	1	0	1	−4	4
Martin Štajnoch	3	0	1	1	−3	2
Michal Sersen	4	0	1	1	−1	4
Milan Bartovič	4	0	1	1	−2	2
Jonathan Sigalet	4	0	1	1	−2	0
Tomáš Mojžíš	4	0	1	1	−2	4
Juraj Mikúš	4	0	1	1	−5	4
Andrej Šťastný	1	0	0	0	−2	0
Martin Bakoš	1	0	0	0	−2	0
Marek Svatoš	2	0	0	0	0	2
Ján Lipiansky	2	0	0	0	−1	2
Ján Tabaček	2	0	0	0	−4	0
Tomáš Mikúš	3	0	0	0	−2	0
Marko Daňo	4	0	0	0	0	4
Peter Ölvecký	4	0	0	0	−2	4

=== Goaltenders ===
Regular season
Player	GP	W	L	SOP	SOG	GA	SV	SV%	GAA	G	A	SO	PIM	TOI
Jaroslav Janus	47	18	16	13	1453	104	1349	92.8	2.17	0	3	5	6	2879:23
Branislav Konrád	4	2	2	0	104	12	92	88.5	2.97	0	0	0	0	242:49
Ville Hostikka	1	0	1	0	24	4	20	83.3	4.02	0	0	0	0	59:46

Playoffs
Player	GP	W	L	SOP	SOG	GA	SV	SV%	GAA	G	A	SO	PIM	TOI
Branislav Konrád	2	0	2	0	70	7	63	90.0	3.21	0	0	0	0	130:44
Jaroslav Janus	2	0	2	0	60	8	52	86.7	4.03	0	0	0	0	119:11

== Milestones and team statistics ==
=== Team milestones ===
Milestone	Date	Reached
1st KHL match	6 September 2012	HC Slovan Bratislava 2 – 4 HC Donbass
1st KHL home match	6 September 2012	HC Slovan Bratislava 2 – 4 HC Donbass
1st KHL away match	15 September 2012	HC Vityaz 0 – 3 HC Slovan Bratislava
1st KHL point	8 September 2012	HC Slovan Bratislava 2 – 3 SO Dinamo Riga
1st KHL win	15 September 2012	HC Vityaz 0 – 3 HC Slovan Bratislava
1st KHL loss	6 September 2012	HC Slovan Bratislava 2 – 4 HC Donbass
1st KHL goal	6 September 2012	Milan Kytnár 1 – 0 ( HC Slovan Bratislava 2 – 4 HC Donbass)
100th KHL goal	18 Jan 2013	Milan Kytnár 1 – 1 (HC Yugra 3 – 1 HC Slovan Bratislava)

=== Team statistics ===
All statistics are for regular season only.

Statistic	Value
Matches played	52
Total points	78
Record	17–11–5–19
Score	124 – 127
Highest win	6 – 2 (Round 21 against Sibir Novosibirsk)
Highest defeat	0 – 6 (Round 17 against Severstal Cherepovets)
Shots on goal %	8.59% (124/1443)
Shutouts	5
Penalty in minutes	595
Powerplay goals	16.1% (34/211)
Penalty killing	85.8% (200/233)
Average attendance	9,977
Number of sold-out home games	25
Most consecutive wins (Note: Regular time wins.)	4 (Round 5 – Round 8)
Most consecutive wins + overtime wins	5 (Round 5 – Round 9)
Most consecutive undefeated matches (Note: Games without a regular time loss.)	5 (Round 5 – Round 9 & Round 33 – Round 37)
Most consecutive losses (Note: Regular time losses)	3 (Round 17 – Round 19)
Most consecutive losses + overtime losses	3 (Round 17 – Round 19)
Most consecutive matches without a win (Note: Games without a regular time win.)	7 (Round 13 – Round 19)
Longest time between scored goals	112:07 (Round 22 – Round 24)
Longest time without a conceded goal	112:55 (Round 47 – Round 49)

=== Player milestones ===
Milestone	Player	Date	Opponent
1st Career KHL Shutout	(Slovakia) Jaroslav Janus	15 September 2012	HC Vityaz
50th Career KHL Point	(Slovakia) Roman Kukumberg	23 November 2012	Atlant Moscow Oblast
50th Career KHL Point	(Slovakia) Juraj Mikúš	13 February 2013	Spartak Moscow

== Roster changes ==
=== Transactions ===
Source: EuroHockey.com

Date	Name	Moved from	Moved to
2 May 2012	(Slovakia) Peter Frühauf	–	(Czech Republic) HC České Budějovice
2 May 2012	(Slovakia) Mário Bližňák	(Czech Republic) HC Sparta Praha	–
2 May 2012	(Slovakia) Milan Bartovič	(Czech Republic) HC Bílí Tygři Liberec	–
23 May 2012	(Slovakia) Milan Kytnár	(Finland) HPK	–
23 May 2012	(Slovakia) Vladimír Dravecký	(Slovakia) HC Košice	–
25 May 2012	(Slovakia) Ján Tabaček	(Slovakia) HC Košice	–
30 May 2012	(Sweden) David Printz	(Sweden) Djurgårdens IF	–
30 May 2012	(Sweden) Josef Boumedienne	(Finland) Jokerit	–
2 June 2012	(Canada) Jonathan Sigalet	(Czech Republic) HC Lev Praha	–
21 June 2012	(Finland) Ville Hostikka	(Finland) Kärpät Oulu	–
28 June 2012	(Slovakia) Vladimír Mihálik	(Czech Republic) HC Lev Praha	–
29 June 2012	(Slovakia) Michel Miklík	(Slovakia) HC Košice	–
6 July 2012	(Latvia) Aleksandrs Jerofejevs	–	(Russia) Kuban Krasnodar (VHL)
10 July 2012	(Czech Republic) Michal Vondrka	(Czech Republic) HC Slavia Praha	–
30 July 2012	(Latvia) Māris Jass	–	(Germany) Hannover Scorpions
13 August 2012	(Slovakia) Michal Macho	–	(Kazakhstan) Saryarka Karaganda (VHL)
14 August 2012	(Czech Republic) Kamil Kreps	(Kazakhstan) Barys Astana	–
25 August 2012	(Slovakia) Jaroslav Janus	(United States) Norfolk Admirals (AHL)	–
30 August 2012	(Czech Republic) Michal Dobroň	–	(United Kingdom) Edinburgh Capitals
10 September 2012	(Canada) Kevin Harvey	–	(United States) Elmira Jackals (ECHL)
13 September 2012	(Slovakia) Tomáš Bulík	–	(Slovakia) Dukla Trenčín
17 September 2012	(Slovakia) Ľubomír Višňovský	(United States) New York Islanders	–
27 September 2012	(Slovakia) Andrej Sekera	(United States) Buffalo Sabres	–
28 September 2012	(Czech Republic) Kamil Kreps	–	(Switzerland) Kloten Flyers
1 November 2012	(Slovakia) Michal Sersen	(Russia) Avtomobilist Yekaterinburg	–
16 November 2012	(Sweden) David Printz	–	(Austria) EHC Lustenau (AUT-2)
13 January 2013	(Czech Republic) Tomáš Mojžíš	(Czech Republic) HC Lev Praha	–
17 January 2013	(Finland) Ville Hostikka	–	(Finland) HC TPS
17 January 2013	(Sweden) Josef Boumedienne	–	(Finland) Kärpät Oulu
23 January 2013	(Slovakia) Marek Svatoš	free agent	–
25 January 2013	(Slovakia) Vladimír Dravecký	–	(Finland) Espoo Blues
31 January 2013	(Slovakia) Juraj Mikúš	(Czech Republic) HC Lev Praha	–

== Draft picks ==
Slovan's picks at the 2012 KHL Junior Draft in Chelyabinsk.

Round	Pick	Player	Position	Nationality	Team (League)
1	32	Marko Daňo	F	Slovakia	Dukla Trenčín (Slovak Extraliga)
2	70	Martin Reway	F	Slovakia	HC Sparta Prague (Czech Extraliga)
3	106	Dominik Rehák	F	Slovakia	MsHK Žilina (Slovak Extraliga)
4	133	Matej Paulovič	F	Slovakia	Färjestads BK jr. (SM-liiga)
5	165	Patrik Koyš	F	Slovakia	Dukla Trenčín jr. (Slovak Extraliga)

== See also ==
- HC Slovan Bratislava all-time record
- List of HC Slovan Bratislava seasons
