= 2015–16 HC Slovan Bratislava season =

2015–16 HC Slovan Bratislava
- Division: 3rd Bobrov
- Conference: 8th Western
- 2015–16 record: 20–9–4–21
- Home record: 11–3–3–12
- Road record: 9–6–1–9
- Goals for: 140
- Goals against: 8130

Team information
- General manager: Maroš Krajči
- Coach: Miloš Říha
- Assistant coach: Roman Stantien
- Captain: Tomáš Surový
- Alternate captains: Ladislav Nagy; Michal Sersen
- Arena: Slovnaft Arena
- Average attendance: 8,819 (87.71%) ▼

Team leaders
- Goals: (Czech Republic) Lukáš Kašpar (14)
- Assists: (Canada) Cam Barker (29)
- Points: (Czech Republic) Lukáš Kašpar (42)
- Penalty minutes: (Slovakia) Andrej Šťastný (64)
- Plus/minus: 2 players (+16)
- Wins: (Canada) Barry Brust (15)
- Goals against average: (Canada) Barry Brust (2.06)

The 2015–16 HC Slovan Bratislava season was the fourth season of the Bratislava-based club HC Slovan Bratislava in the Kontinental Hockey League. On July 2 it was officially announced that Slovan would continue playing in the KHL, with Miloš Říha appointed head coach. Tomáš Surový was appointed team captain with Ladislav Nagy and Michal Sersen as alternate captains.

== Schedule and results ==
=== Pre-season ===
The pre-season schedule was announced on July 12, 2015.

2015–16 Game Log
Pre-season: 6–2–0–2 (Home: 0–2–0–1; Road: 3–0–0–1; Neutral: 3–0–0–0)

#	Date	Home team	Score	Away team	Arena	Attendance	Recap
1	July 22	(Russia) Salavat Yulaev	2–3	Slovan Bratislava	Maribor, Slovenia		
2	July 24	(Russia) Salavat Yulaev	2–3	Slovan Bratislava	Maribor, Slovenia		
3	July 28	Slovan Bratislava	2–1	(Russia) Torpedo Nizhny Novgorod	Kajot Arena, Brno		
4	August 4	Slovan Bratislava	5 – 4 SO	(Czech Republic) Kometa Brno	Slovnaft Arena	6,355	
5	August 6	Slovan Bratislava	3 – 2 SO	(Czech Republic) PSG Zlín	Slovnaft Arena	4,673	
6	August 8	Slovan Bratislava	1–3	(Croatia) Medveščak Zagreb	Slovnaft Arena	5,043	
7	August 11	(Czech Republic) Kometa Brno	5–1	Slovan Bratislava	Kajot Arena		
8	August 13	(Czech Republic) PSG Zlín	2–3	Slovan Bratislava	Zimní stadion Luďka Čajky		
9	August 18	(Czech Republic) Vítkovice Steel	3–6	Slovan Bratislava	ČEZ Aréna		
10	August 21	(Slovakia) HKm Zvolen	1–6	Slovan Bratislava	Steiger Aréna		

Win Overtime/shootout win Overtime/shootout loss Loss

=== Regular season ===
2015–16 Game Log
August: 1–0–0–2 (Home: 1–0–0–2; Road: 0–0–0–0) Pts. 3

#	Date	Home team	Score	Away team	Decision	Arena	Attendance	Record	Recap
1	26	Slovan Bratislava	1–3	Admiral Vladivostok	Garnett	Slovnaft Arena	9,270	0–0–0–1	
2	28	Slovan Bratislava	0–1	Amur Khabarovsk	Garnett	Slovnaft Arena	7,218	0–0–0–2	
3	30	Slovan Bratislava	6–0	Metallurg Novokuznetsk	Garnett	Slovnaft Arena	6,875	1–0–0–2	

September: 3–3–1–5 (Home: 1–1–1–4; Road: 2–2–0–1) Pts. 16

#	Date	Home team	Score	Away team	Decision	Arena	Attendance	Record	Recap
4	1	Slovan Bratislava	2–3	Sibir Novosibirsk	Garnett	Slovnaft Arena	7,547	1–0–0–3	
5	6	Slovan Bratislava	3–2	(Croatia) Medveščak Zagreb	Brust	Slovnaft Arena	8,123	2–0–0–3	
6	10	Dynamo Moscow	1–2	Slovan Bratislava	Brust	Luzhniki	6,170	3–0–0–3	
7	12	HC Vityaz	2–5	Slovan Bratislava	Garnett	Podolsk Hero Arena	3,500	4–0–0–3	
8	14	(Croatia) Medveščak Zagreb	2 – 3 OT	Slovan Bratislava	Brust	Dom Sportova	5,000	4–1–0–3	
9	17	Slovan Bratislava	1 – 2 OT	SKA St. Petersburg	Garnett	Slovnaft Arena	10,055	4–1–1–3	
10	19	Slovan Bratislava	2–5	Spartak Moscow	Garnett	Slovnaft Arena	9,329	4–1–1–4	
11	21	Slovan Bratislava	3 – 2 OT	(Latvia) Dinamo Riga	Brust	Slovnaft Arena	7,577	4–2–1–4	
12	23	(Finland) Jokerit Helsinki	4–1	Slovan Bratislava	Brust	Hartwall Arena	9,503	4–2–1–5	
13	25	(Latvia) Dinamo Riga	1 – 2 SO	Slovan Bratislava	Garnett	Arena Riga	7,586	4–3–1–5	
14	28	Slovan Bratislava	0–3	Neftekhimik Nizhnekamsk	Brust	Slovnaft Arena	7,080	4–3–1–6	
15	30	Slovan Bratislava	1–3	Traktor Chelyabinsk	Garnett	Slovnaft Arena	6,883	4–3–1–7	

October: 4–2–2–5 (Home: 2–1–2–3; Road: 2–1–0–2) Pts. 18

#	Date	Home team	Score	Away team	Decision	Arena	Attendance	Record	Recap
16	2	Slovan Bratislava	3 – 4 OT	Salavat Yulaev Ufa	Brust	Slovnaft Arena	7,820	4–3–2–7	
17	4	Slovan Bratislava	2–5	Metallurg Magnitogorsk	Garnett	Slovnaft Arena	8,342	4–3–2–8	
18	7	Salavat Yulaev Ufa	3–2	Slovan Bratislava	Garnett, Brust	Ufa Arena	5,503	4–3–2–9	
19	9	Metallurg Magnitogorsk	2–3	Slovan Bratislava	Brust	Arena Metallurg	5,785	5–3–2–9	
20	11	Lada Togliatti	2–1	Slovan Bratislava	Brust	Lada Arena	3,289	5–3–2–10	
21	13	Ak Bars Kazan	0–1	Slovan Bratislava	Brust	TatNeft Arena	7,157	6–3–2–10	
22	17	Slovan Bratislava	6–0	HC Ugra	Brust	Slovnaft Arena	8,440	7–3–2–10	
23	19	Slovan Bratislava	4 – 3 SO	Avtomobilist Yekaterinburg	Brust	Slovnaft Arena	7,143	7–4–2–10	
24	21	Slovan Bratislava	5–3	Barys Astana	Garnett	Slovnaft Arena	7,862	8–4–2–10	
25	23	Slovan Bratislava	0–3	Avangard Omsk	Garnett	Slovnaft Arena	10,055	8–4–2–11	
26	26	(Belarus) Dinamo Minsk	3 – 4 SO	Slovan Bratislava	Brust	Arena Metallurg	9,726	8–5–2–11	
27	28	Slovan Bratislava	2–5	Lada Togliatti	Brust, Garnett	Slovnaft Arena	7,887	8–5–2–12	
28	30	Slovan Bratislava	1 – 2 SO	Ak Bars Kazan	Brust	Slovnaft Arena	8,854	8–5–3–12	

November: 5–1–0–3 (Home: 2–1–0–0; Road: 3–0–0–3) Pts. 16

#	Date	Home team	Score	Away team	Decision	Arena	Attendance	Record	Recap
29	1	(Croatia) Medveščak Zagreb	6–2	Slovan Bratislava	Brust	Dom Sportova	5,390	8–5–3–13	
30	10	Torpedo Nizhny Novgorod	5–3	Slovan Bratislava	Garnett	Trade Union Sport Palace	5,200	8–5–3–14	
31	12	(Belarus) Dinamo Minsk	2–1	Slovan Bratislava	Brust	Minsk-Arena	8,529	8–5–3–15	
32	14	Slovan Bratislava	3 – 2 SO	CSKA Moscow	Brust	Slovnaft Arena	10,055	8–6–3–15	
33	16	Slovan Bratislava	5–4	Severstal Cherepovets	Brust	Slovnaft Arena	9,284	9–6–3–15	
34	19	CSKA Moscow	0–2	Slovan Bratislava	Garnett	CSKA Ice Palace	3,956	10–6–3–15	
35	21	Severstal Cherepovets	1–2	Slovan Bratislava	Garnett	Ice Palace	4,463	11–6–3–15	
36	24	Slovan Bratislava	4–1	(Belarus) Dinamo Minsk	Garnett	Slovnaft Arena	9,332	12–6–3–15	
37	29	HC Ugra	1–3	Slovan Bratislava	Garnett	Arena Ugra	3,000	13–6–3–15	

December: 2–2–1–4 (Home: 2–0–0–2; Road: 0–2–1–2) Pts. 11

#	Date	Home team	Score	Away team	Decision	Arena	Attendance	Record	Recap
38	1	Avtomobilist Yekaterinburg	4–3	Slovan Bratislava	Garnett, Brust	KRK Uralets	3,390	13–6–3–16	
39	3	(Kazakhstan) Barys Astana	5–4 OT	Slovan Bratislava	Garnett	Barys Arena	3,964	13–6–4–16	
40	5	Avangard Omsk	5–3	Slovan Bratislava	Brust	Omsk Arena	8,270	13–6–4–17	
41	9	Slovan Bratislava	4–5	HC Sochi	Brust	Slovnaft Arena	9,108	13–6–4–18	
42	11	Slovan Bratislava	0–1	Lokomotiv Yaroslavl	Brust	Slovnaft Arena	10,055	13–6–4–19	
43	22	Slovan Bratislava	4–2	(Belarus) Dinamo Minsk	Brust	Slovnaft Arena	10,055	14–6–4–19	
44	26	Slovan Bratislava	3–0	Torpedo Nizhny Novgorod	Brust	Slovnaft Arena	10,055	15–6–4–19	
45	28	Neftekhimik Nizhnekamsk	0–1 SO	Slovan Bratislava	Brust	Neftekhimik Ice Palace	5,000	15–7–4–19	
46	30	Traktor Chelyabinsk	1–2 SO	Slovan Bratislava	Brust	Traktor Ice Arena	7,000	15–8–4–19	

January: 5–1–0–3 (Home: 3–0–0–1; Road: 2–1–0–2) Pts. 17

#	Date	Home team	Score	Away team	Decision	Arena	Attendance	Record	Recap
47	4	(Latvia) Dinamo Riga	1–2 SO	Slovan Bratislava	Brust	Arena Riga	3,888	15–9–4–19	
48	6	Slovan Bratislava	4–2	(Finland) Jokerit Helsinki	Brust	Slovnaft Arena	10,055	16–9–4–19	
49	11	Spartak Moscow	0–4	Slovan Bratislava	Brust	Sokolniki Arena	4,103	17–9–4–19	
50	13	SKA Saint Petersburg	3–2	Slovan Bratislava	Garnett	Ice Palace	11,046	17–9–4–20	
51	16	Slovan Bratislava	4–2	Vityaz	Brust	Slovnaft Arena	10,055	18–9–4–20	
52	18	Slovan Bratislava	3–4	Dynamo Moscow	Brust	Slovnaft Arena	10,055	18–9–4–21	
53	20	Slovan Bratislava	3–2	(Croatia) Medveščak Zagreb	Brust	Slovnaft Arena	10,055	19–9–4–21	
54	29	Metallurg Novokuznetsk	2–3	Slovan Bratislava	Brust	Sports Palace	3,150	20–9–4–21	
55	29	Sibir Novosibirsk	3–2	Slovan Bratislava	Brust	Ice Sports Palace	7,400	20–9–4–22	

February: 1–2–0–2 (Home: 0–1–0–0; Road: 1–1–0–2) Pts. 7

#	Date	Home team	Score	Away team	Decision	Arena	Attendance	Record	Recap
56	2	Admiral Vladivostok	1–3	Slovan Bratislava	Garnett	Fetisov Arena	5,309	21–9–4–22	
57	4	Amur Khabarovsk	2–3 SO	Slovan Bratislava	Garnett	Platinum Arena	6,900	21–10–4–22	
58	8	Slovan Bratislava	3–2 OT	(Latvia) Dinamo Riga	Brust	Slovnaft Arena	10,055	21–11–4–22	
59	16	HC Sochi	5–2	Slovan Bratislava	Garnett	Bolshoy Ice Dome	6,789	21–11–4–23	
60	18	Lokomotiv Yaroslavl	5 – 1	Slovan Bratislava	Garnett	Arena 2000	8,154	21–11–4–24	

Win (3 points) Overtime/shootout win (2 points) Overtime/shootout loss (1 point) Loss (0 points)

=== Playoffs ===
2016 Gagarin Cup Playoffs
Western Conference Quarterfinal vs. (1) CSKA Moscow – CSKA won 4–0

#	Date	Home team	Score	Away team	Decision	Arena	Attendance	Series	Recap
1	21 Feb	CSKA Moscow	2 – 0	Slovan Bratislava	Brust	CSKA Ice Palace	4,463	0 – 1	
2	23 Feb	CSKA Moscow	3 – 2 OT	Slovan Bratislava	Brust	CSKA Ice Palace	5,073	0 – 2	
3	25 Feb	Slovan Bratislava	1 – 2	CSKA Moscow	Brust	Slovnaft Arena	10,055	0 – 3	
4	27 Feb	Slovan Bratislava	1 – 3	CSKA Moscow	Brust	Slovnaft Arena	10,055	0 – 4	[]

Win Loss

== Standings ==
=== Western Conference ===
Pos	Team	Pld	W	OTW	OTL	L	GF	GA	GD	Pts	Qualification
1	CSKA Moscow	60	38	5	3	14	163	87	+76	127	Advance to Gagarin Cup Playoffs (Note: Two winners of divisions hold the first two places in the conference)
2	Jokerit	60	31	5	5	19	167	140	+27	108	Advance to Gagarin Cup Playoffs
3	Lokomotiv Yaroslavl	60	37	6	2	15	155	94	+61	125	Advance to Gagarin Cup Playoffs
4	HC Sochi	60	30	4	10	16	175	149	+26	108	Advance to Gagarin Cup Playoffs
5	Dynamo Moscow	60	27	8	8	17	167	126	+41	105	Advance to Gagarin Cup Playoffs
6	SKA Saint Petersburg	60	27	6	7	20	176	149	+27	100	Advance to Gagarin Cup Playoffs
7	Torpedo Nizhny Novgorod	60	23	10	11	16	163	137	+26	100	Advance to Gagarin Cup Playoffs
8	Slovan Bratislava	60	21	11	4	24	154	148	+6	89	Advance to Gagarin Cup Playoffs
9	Dinamo Minsk	60	20	7	9	24	147	168	−21	83	
10	Medveščak Zagreb	60	19	6	9	26	144	172	−28	78	
11	Spartak Moscow	60	20	5	7	28	139	172	−33	77	
12	Dinamo Riga	60	17	8	8	27	129	151	−22	75	
13	Vityaz Podolsk	60	17	8	3	32	129	166	−37	70	
14	Severstal Cherepovets	60	12	8	6	34	124	167	−43	58	

Updated to match(es) played on 18 February 2016. Source: KHL
Rules for classification: 1) points; 2) a higher number of wins in the regular time; 3) a higher number of wins in overtime and shootouts; 4) goal difference; 5) number of goals scored; 6) drawing of lots.

== Player statistics ==
=== Goaltenders ===
Regular season
Player	GP	W	L	SOP	SOG	GA	SV	SV%	GAA	G	A	SO	PIM	TOI
Barry Brust	37	16	11	7	929	74	855	92.0	2.08	0	1	5	40	2130:42
Michael Garnett	28	8	16	2	759	72	687	90.5	2.85	0	0	2	10	1517:13

=== Skaters ===
Regular season
Player	GP	G	A	Pts	+/-	PIM
Lukáš Kašpar	58	16	31	47	+15	39
Cam Barker	55	9	31	40	0	75
Rok Tičar	57	14	17	31	+1	24
Žiga Jeglič	60	7	18	25	−2	24
Václav Nedorost	54	12	12	24	+12	46
Marek Viedenský	57	10	13	23	+6	26
Andrej Šťastný	43	13	9	22	−3	76
Milan Bartovič	60	8	12	20	+2	28
Tomáš Surový	59	3	13	16	−5	42
Michel Miklík	40	12	3	15	−2	16
Ladislav Nagy	48	7	8	15	−7	34
Michal Sersen	57	4	8	12	−7	57
Tomáš Kundrátek	16	4	7	11	+4	14
Tomáš Starosta	51	4	6	10	0	26
Ľubomír Višňovský	9	2	8	10	+4	2
Ivan Švarný	59	1	9	10	0	32
Pavol Skalický	60	6	2	8	−15	20
Patrik Lušňák	55	4	3	7	−10	18
Francis Paré	16	3	2	5	−1	0
Dávid Skokan	27	3	2	5	+2	18
Vladimír Mihálik	49	1	3	4	+3	53
Patrik Luža	36	1	2	3	−2	18
Filip Novák	16	1	1	2	−1	12
Radovan Puliš	5	1	0	1	0	0
Anatoliy Protasenja	6	0	1	1	−1	4
Juraj Valach	25	0	1	1	−1	26
Lukáš Kozák	32	0	1	1	−4	8
Samuel Petráš	2	0	0	0	0	0
Patrik Bačík	2	0	0	0	−3	2
Juraj Šiška	3	0	0	0	−2	2
Marek Tvrdoň	4	0	0	0	−2	2
Louis Leblanc	7	0	0	0	−6	16
Mislav Rosandić	8	0	0	0	−1	2

== Team statistics ==
All statistics are for regular season only.

Statistic	Value
Matches played	60
Total points	89
Record	21–11–4–24
Score	154 – 148
Biggest win	6 – 0 (Round 3 vs. Metallurg Novokuznetsk & Round 22 vs. HC Ugra)
Biggest defeat	2 – 6 (Round 29 vs. Medveščak Zagreb); 1 – 5 (Round 60 vs.Lokomotiv Yaroslavl)
Shots on goal %	7.79% (154/1977)
Shutouts	6
Penalty in minutes	840
Powerplay %	16.7% (39/234)
Penalty killing	86.2% (225/261)
Average attendance	8,819
Number of sold-out home games	11
Most consecutive wins (Note: Regular time wins.)	5 (Round 33 – Round 37)
Most consecutive wins + overtime wins	7 (Round 43 – Round 49)
Most consecutive undefeated matches (Note: Games without a regular time loss.)	7 (Round 43 – Round 49)
Most consecutive losses (Note: Regular time losses)	3 (Round 29 – Round 31 & Round 40 – Round 42)
Most consecutive losses + overtime losses	6 (Round 10 – Round 15)
Most consecutive matches without a win (Note: Games without a regular time win.)	11 (Round 8 – Round 18)
Longest time between scored goals	79:39 (Round 14 – Round 15)
Longest time without a conceded goal	121:15 (Round 20 – Round 23)

Notes

== Roster changes ==
=== Players Joining ===
Date	Player	Former team	Contract terms
3 July 2015	(Canada) Michael Garnett	(Russia) Traktor Chelyabinsk	1 year
6 July 2015	(Slovakia) Rastislav Špirko	(Russia) Amur Khabarovsk	1 year
7 July 2015	(Slovakia) Ivan Švarný	(Belarus) Dinamo Minsk	1 year
7 July 2015	(Slovakia) Marek Viedenský	(Finland) HPK	1 year
9 July 2015	(Slovakia) Pavol Skalický	(Slovakia) HC Košice	1 year
9 July 2015	(Slovakia) (Croatia) Mislav Rosandić	(Slovakia) HC '05 Banská Bystrica	1 year
13 July 2015	(Canada) Barry Brust	(Russia) HC Ugra	1 year
27 July 2015	(Slovakia) Juraj Valach	(Czech Republic) HC Slavia Prague	1 year
17 August 2015	(Slovakia) Radovan Puliš	(Slovakia) HKm Zvolen	1 year
21 August 2015	(Czech Republic) Lukáš Kašpar	(Finland) Oulun Kärpät	
21 August 2015	(Belarus) Anatoliy Protasenja	(Belarus) Yunost Minsk	
5 September 2015	(Czech Republic) Filip Novák	(Russia) HC Dynamo Moscow	1 year
20 September 2015	(Slovakia) Michel Miklík	(Russia) Amur Khabarovsk	2 years
16 October 2015	(Canada) Francis Paré	(Russia) Traktor Chelyabinsk	
20 October 2015	(Canada) Louis Leblanc	(United States) Norfolk Admirals (AHL)	
27 October 2015	(Slovakia) Ľubomír Višňovský	(United States) New York Islanders	1 year
21 December 2015	(Czech Republic) Tomáš Kundrátek	(Latvia) Dinamo Riga	2 years
22 December 2015	(Slovakia) Marek Tvrdoň	(United States) Toledo Walleye (ECHL)	1 year
25 December 2015	(Slovakia) Juraj Šiška	(Slovakia) HK Orange 20	2 years
25 December 2015	(Slovakia) Boris Sadecký	(Slovakia) HK Orange 20	3 years

=== Players Leaving ===
Date	Player	New team	Contract terms
17 April 2015	(Slovakia) Samuel Baroš	(Slovakia) HKm Zvolen	
18 May 2015	(Slovakia) Libor Hudáček	(Sweden) Örebro HK	
1 June 2015	(Czech Republic) Tomáš Netík	(Czech Republic) HC Sparta Prague	
5 June 2015	(Slovakia) Mário Lunter	(Slovakia) HC '05 Banská Bystrica	
19 June 2015	(Slovakia) Andrej Kudrna	(Czech Republic) HC Sparta Prague	
15 July 2015	(Slovakia) Denis Godla		
28 July 2015	(Slovakia) Martin Štajnoch	(Czech Republic) HC Pardubice	
28 July 2015	(Slovakia) Peter Ölvecký		
31 July 2015	(Slovakia) Rastislav Špirko		
5 July 2015	(United States) Patrick White	(Austria) Graz 99ers	
5 July 2015	(Slovakia) Ján Brejčák	(Switzerland) HC Davos	
12 August 2015	(Slovakia) Ivan Baranka	(Sweden) Rögle BK	
24 August 2015	(United States) Matt Murley	(Germany) Thomas Sabo Ice Tigers	
29 September 2015	(Slovakia) Denis Godla	(Finland) Kokkolan Hermes	
1 October 2015	(Belarus) Anatoliy Protasenja		
16 October 2015	(Czech Republic) Filip Novák	(Russia) Traktor Chelyabinsk	
25 December 2015	(Slovakia) Juraj Valach		
15 January 2016	(Canada) Louis Leblanc	(Switzerland) Lausanne HC	
22 January 2016	(Canada) Francis Paré	(Finland) TPS	
29 January 2016	(Slovakia) Lukáš Kozák	(Czech Republic) Kometa Brno	

=== Player signings ===
This is the list of all players that extended their contracts with HC Slovan Bratislava:

Date	Player	Contract prolonged until
6 July 2015	(Slovakia) Vladimír Mihálik	30 April 2016
6 July 2015	(Slovakia) Patrik Luža	30 April 2017
6 July 2015	(Slovakia) Tomáš Starosta	30 April 2017
7 July 2015	(Slovenia) Žiga Jeglič	30 April 2016
7 July 2015	(Slovenia) Rok Tičar	30 April 2016
7 July 2015	(Czech Republic) Václav Nedorost	30 April 2016
10 July 2015	(Canada) Cam Barker	30 April 2016
29 July 2015	(Slovakia) Tomáš Surový	30 April 2016
8 August 2015	(Slovakia) Michal Sersen	30 April 2016

== Draft picks ==
Slovan's picks at the 2015 KHL Junior Draft.

Round	Pick	Player	Position	Nationality	Team (League)
1	3	Jakub Lacka	F	Slovakia	HK 99 Ružinov jr. (Slovak Extraliga jr.)
2	31	Martin Bodák	F	Slovakia	HK Spišská Nová Ves jr. (Slovak Extraliga jr.)
3	58	Samuel Rudý	D	Slovakia	HC Pardubice jr. (Czech Extraliga jr.)
4	82	Samuel Solenský	F	Slovakia	HC Bílí Tygři Liberec jr. (Czech Extraliga jr.)
5	Draft pick traded to Salavat Yulaev Ufa for rights for Tomáš Záborský				

== See also ==
- HC Slovan Bratislava all-time KHL record
- List of HC Slovan Bratislava seasons
