= 2011 NHL Premiere =

The 2011 NHL Premiere was the National Hockey League's fifth European multi-game event to open the regular season, featuring the Anaheim Ducks, the Buffalo Sabres, the Los Angeles Kings and the New York Rangers. It took place on October 7–8, 2011, to open the 2011–12 NHL season. Preceding this, as with previous Premiere events, the NHL teams participated in a series of exhibition games with European teams as part of the 2011 NHL Premiere Challenge, between September 29 and October 4, 2011.

Later on in the season, a contingent of Adler Mannheim fans would embark on their own tour of hockey games in Buffalo and Toronto, with the backing of the Sabres and the Toronto Maple Leafs.

== NHL Premiere Challenge ==
=== Game one ===
Date	City	Arena	Team	Team	Score	Reference
September 29	Prague, Czech Republic	Tesla Arena	New York Rangers	Sparta Prague	2–0	

Scoring summary
Period	Team	Goal	Assist(s)	Time	Score
1st	None				
2nd	NYR	Artem Anisimov	Tim Erixon and Brandon Dubinsky	05:45	1–0 NYR
2nd	NYR	Ruslan Fedotenko (PP)	Michael Del Zotto and Tim Erixon	08:30	2–0 NYR
3rd	None				
Penalty summary
Period	Team	Player	Penalty	Time	PIM
1st	NYR	Brendan Bell	Tripping	06:38	2:00
1st	PRA	Jaroslav Kasík	Holding	08:44	2:00
1st	NYR	Brandon Prust	Hooking	13:38	2:00
2nd	PRA	Yorick Treille	Hooking	06:52	2:00
2nd	PRA	Petr Tenkrát	High-sticking	14:45	2:00
3rd	PRA	Daniel Sobotka	Holding	01:43	2:00
3rd	PRA	Ivan Rachůnek	Hooking	18:37	2:00

=== Game two ===
Date	City	Arena	Team	Team	Score	Reference
September 30	Gothenburg, Sweden	Scandinavium	New York Rangers	Frölunda HC	4–2	

Scoring summary
Period	Team	Goal	Assist(s)	Time	Score
1st	NYR	Kris Newbury	Ryan Bourque and Michael Del Zotto	02:24	1–0 NYR
1st	FRL	Jonathan Johnson	Johan Sundström and Viktor Svedberg	05:00	1–1
2nd	NYR	Michael Del Zotto	Mats Zuccarello and Kris Newbury	05:24	2–1 NYR
2nd	NYR	Erik Christensen	Mats Zuccarello and Stu Bickel	11:25	3–1 NYR
3rd	FRL	Mika Pyörälä	Fredrik Pettersson and Christian Bäckman	12:04	3–2 NYR
3rd	NYR	Michael Rupp	Brendan Bell and Brian Boyle	16:48	4–2 NYR
Penalty summary
Period	Team	Player	Penalty	Time	PIM
1st	FRL	Mathis Olimb	Hooking	06:36	2:00
1st	NYR	Dylan McIlrath	Cross checking	19:10	2:00
1st	NYR	Brandon Prust	Interference	19:58	2:00
2nd	NYR	Stu Bickel	High-sticking	01:39	2:00
2nd	NYR	Tim Erixon	Delay of game	02:51	2:00
2nd	FRL	Mika Pyörälä	cross checking	13:54	2:00
2nd	NYR	Brendan Bell	Hooking	16:25	2:00
2nd	FRL	Fredrik Pettersson	Interference	18:13	2:00
3rd	FRL	Viktor Svedberg	Hooking	07:25	2:00
3rd	NYR	Michael Del Zotto	Holding	10:50	2:00

=== Game three ===
Date	City	Arena	Team	Team	Score	Reference
October 2	Bratislava, Slovakia	Ondrej Nepela Arena	New York Rangers	Slovan Bratislava	4–1	

Scoring summary
Period	Team	Goal	Assist(s)	Time	Score
1st	BRA	Ivan Švarný (PP)	Michal Macho and Miroslav Šatan	08:42	1–0 BRA
2nd	NYR	Mats Zuccarello (PP)	Brad Richards and Marian Gaborik	06:03	1–1
2nd	NYR	Brian Boyle	Dan Girardi and Derek Stepan	07:02	2–1 NYR
2nd	NYR	Artem Anisimov (SH)	Brandon Prust	17:42	3–1 NYR
3rd	NYR	Ryan McDonagh	Ryan Callahan	10:11	4–1 NYR
Penalty summary
Period	Team	Player	Penalty	Time	PIM
1st	NYR	Michael Rupp	Hooking	07:14	2:00
1st	NYR	Brian Boyle	Boarding	15:59	2:00
1st	NYR	Steve Eminger	Cross checking	17:38	2:00
2nd	BRA	Ján Lipiansky	Hooking	00:35	2:00
2nd	BRA	Martin Štajnoch	Hooking	04:56	2:00
2nd	BRA	Dávid Skokan	Interference	04:56	2:00
2nd	NYR	Steve Eminger	Holding	08:03	2:00
2nd	NYR	Stu Bickel	Hooking	16:24	2:00
3rd	BRA	Dávid Skokan	Holding	02:39	2:00
3rd	NYR	Michael Rupp	Cross checking	13:39	2:00
3rd	NYR	Stu Bickel	Hooking	16:41	2:00

=== Game four ===
Date	City	Arena	Team	Team	Score	Reference
October 3	Zug, Switzerland	Bossard Arena	New York Rangers	EV Zug	4–8	

=== Game five ===
Date	City	Arena	Team	Team	Score	Reference
October 4	Helsinki, Finland	Hartwall Areena	Anaheim Ducks	Jokerit	4–3 OT	

=== Game six ===
Date	City	Arena	Team	Team	Score	Reference
October 4	Hamburg, Germany	O2 World (Hamburg)	Los Angeles Kings	Hamburg Freezers	5–4	

Scoring summary
Period	Team	Goal	Assist(s)	Time	Score
1st	LA	Justin Williams	Anze Kopitar	00:36	1–0 LA
1st	HAM	Serge Aubin (PP)	Charles Cook and Patrick Traverse	12:51	1–1 TIED
1st	LA	Alec Martinez	Mike Richards and Simon Gagne	13:25	2–1 LA
1st	HAM	Kevin Schmidt	Jesper Jensen and David Wolf	17:32	2-2 TIED
2nd	HAM	Serge Aubin	Brendan Brooks and Thomas Dolak	11:42	3–2 HAM
2nd	LA	Anze Kopitar	Justin Williams and Scott Parse	13:32	3–3 TIED
2nd	LA	Brad Richardson	Jarret Stoll and Rob Scuderi	19:46	4–3 LA
3rd	LA	Ethan Moreau	Rob Scuderi and Anze Kopitar	03:50	5–3 LA
3rd	HAM	Brendan Brooks	Thomas Dolak	19:31	5–4 LA
Penalty summary
Period	Team	Player	Penalty	Time	PIM
1st	LA	Scott Parse	Slashing	11:20	2:00
2nd	HAM	Charles Cook	Tripping	01:02	2:00
2nd	HAM	David Wolf	Holding	05:45	2:00
2nd	HAM	Serge Aubin	Hooking	16:21	2:00
3rd	LA	Simon Gagne	Interference	05:28	2:00

=== Game seven ===
Date	City	Arena	Team	Team	Score	Reference
October 4	Mannheim, Germany	SAP Arena	Buffalo Sabres	Adler Mannheim	8–3	

Scoring summary
Period	Team	Goal	Assist(s)	Time	Score
1st	BUF	Tyler Ennis		07:18	1–0 BUF
1st	BUF	Tyler Ennis	Ville Leino and Mike Weber	11:22	2–0 BUF
1st	BUF	Luke Adam (PP)	Thomas Vanek and Jason Pominville	18:19	3–0 BUF
2nd	MAN	Yannic Seidenberg	Frank Mauer and Christoph Ullmann	00:06	3–1 BUF
2nd	BUF	Brad Boyes		01:11	4–1 BUF
2nd	MAN	Jamie Sifers (PP)	Mike Glumac	07:50	4–2 BUF
2nd	BUF	Christian Ehrhoff (PP)	Marc-Andre Gragnani and Jason Pominville	13:58	5–2 BUF
2nd	BUF	Thomas Vanek	Luke Adam	18:02	6–2 BUF
3rd	MAN	Mike Glumac	Yanick Lehoux and Marc El-Sayed	08:52	6–3 BUF
3rd	BUF	Jason Pominville	Thomas Vanek	13:43	7–3 BUF
3rd	BUF	Ville Leino	Brad Boyes and Tyler Ennis	16:13	8–3 BUF
Penalty summary
Period	Team	Player	Penalty	Time	PIM
1st	BUF	Christian Ehrhoff	Cross checking	04:53	2:00
1st	MAN	Denis Reul	Holding	12:48	2:00
1st	MAN	Nikolai Goc	Holding	18:11	2:00
2nd	BUF	Patrick Kaleta	Tripping	06:35	2:00
2nd	MAN	Nikolai Goc	Hooking	13:01	2:00
2nd	MAN	Denis Reul	Holding	15:57	2:00
3rd	BUF	Mike Weber	Interference	05:41	2:00
3rd	MAN	Michael Glumac	Hooking	14:12	2:00
3rd	MAN	Shawn Belle	Hooking	19:12	2:00

== NHL Premiere ==
=== Game one ===
Date	City	Arena	Team	Team	Score
October 7	Helsinki, Finland	Hartwall Areena	Anaheim Ducks	Buffalo Sabres	1-4

=== Game two ===
Date	City	Arena	Team	Team	Score
October 7	Stockholm, Sweden	Ericsson Globe	Los Angeles Kings	New York Rangers	3-2 (OT)

=== Game three ===
Date	City	Arena	Team	Team	Score
October 8	Stockholm, Sweden	Ericsson Globe	Anaheim Ducks	New York Rangers	2-1 (SO)

=== Game four ===
Date	City	Arena	Team	Team	Score
October 8	Berlin, Germany	O2 World (Berlin)	Buffalo Sabres	Los Angeles Kings	4-2
