= 2016–17 HC Slovan Bratislava season =

HC Slovan Bratislava season

2016–17 HC Slovan Bratislava
- Division: 4th Bobrov
- Conference: 10th Western
- 2016–17 record: 22–7–5–26
- Home record: 12–5–4–9
- Road record: 10–2–1–17
- Goals for: 144
- Goals against: 166

Team information
- General manager: Maroš Krajči
- Coach: (Czech Republic) Miloš Říha
- Assistant coach: (Slovakia) Roman Stantien
- Captain: (Slovakia) Andrej Meszároš
- Arena: Slovnaft Arena
- Average attendance: 8,804 (87.56%) ▼

Team leaders
- Goals: (United States) Jeff Taffe (18)
- Assists: (United States) Jonathan Cheechoo (26)
- Points: (United States) Jeff Taffe (43)
- Penalty minutes: (Slovakia) Andrej Meszároš (63)
- Plus/minus: (+) (Slovakia) Michal Hlinka (+5) (−) (Slovakia) Patrik Lušňák (−14)
- Wins: (Canada) Barry Brust (19)
- Goals against average: (Canada) Barry Brust (2.42)

The 2016–17 HC Slovan Bratislava season will be the 5th season for Bratislava based club in Kontinental Hockey League.

== Schedule and results ==
=== Pre-season ===
2016–17 Game Log
Pre-season: 6–0–1–3 (Home: 2–0–1–0; Road: 2–0–0–2; Neutral: 2–0–0–1)

#	Date	Home team	Score	Away team	Arena	Attendance	Recap
1	July 27	(Russia) Torpedo Nizhny Novgorod	2–3	Slovan Bratislava	Maribor, Slovenia		
2	July 29	(Czech Republic) PSG Zlín	2–3	Slovan Bratislava	Zimní stadion Luďka Čajky	2,700	
3	August 3	(Czech Republic) HC Sparta Praha	4–2	Slovan Bratislava	O2 Arena		
4	August 4	(Czech Republic) HC Kometa Brno	5–3	Slovan Bratislava	DRFG Arena	5,212	
5	August 9	Slovan Bratislava	2–1	(Czech Republic) HC Kometa Brno	Ondrej Nepela Arena	5,260	
6	August 11	(Sweden) Linköpings HC	4–2	Slovan Bratislava	Werk Arena	511	
7	August 12	(Czech Republic) HC Oceláři Třinec	2–3	Slovan Bratislava	Werk Arena	2,925	
8	August 14	(Czech Republic) HC Vítkovice Steel	0–2	Slovan Bratislava	Werk Arena		
9	August 16	Slovan Bratislava	2–3 SO	(Croatia) KHL Medveščak Zagreb	Ondrej Nepela Arena	5,127	
10	August 18	Slovan Bratislava	5–2	(Czech Republic) PSG Zlín	Ondrej Nepela Arena	3,730	

Win Overtime/shootout win Overtime/shootout loss Loss

=== Regular season ===
2016–17 Game Log
August: 2–0–0–2 (Home: 2–0–0–0; Road: 0–0–0–2) Pts. 6

#	Date	Home team	Score	Away team	Decision	Arena	Attendance	Record	Recap
1	23	Ak Bars	2–1	Slovan Bratislava	Pogge	TatNeft Arena	8,890	0–0–0–1	
2	25	Lada Togliatti	5–2	Slovan Bratislava	Brust	Lada Arena	4,550	0–0–0–2	
3	29	Slovan Bratislava	7–4	Torpedo Nizhny Novgorod	Pogge	Ondrej Nepela Arena	8,773	1–0–0–2	
4	31	Slovan Bratislava	3–1	HC Sochi	Brust	Ondrej Nepela Arena	8,697	2–0–0–2	

September: 2–1–1–5 (Home: 0–1–0–1; Road: 2–0–1–4) Pts. 9

#	Date	Home team	Score	Away team	Decision	Arena	Attendance	Record	Recap
5	4	Slovan Bratislava	1–2	Spartak Moscow	Brust	Ondrej Nepela Arena	9,254	2–0–0–3	
6	9	Metallurg Novokuznetsk	2–1	Slovan Bratislava	Pogge	Sports Palace	2,395	2–0–0–4	
7	11	Avangard Omsk	3–4	Slovan Bratislava	Brust	Arena Omsk	9,870	3–0–0–4	
8	13	Sibir Novosibirsk	3–2 SO	Slovan Bratislava	Brust	Ice Sports Palace	7,400	3–0–1–4	
9	17	Slovan Bratislava	3–2 SO	(Croatia) Medveščak Zagreb	Pogge, Brust	Ondrej Nepela Arena	9,580	3–1–1–4	
10	20	Metallurg Magnitogorsk	4–2	Slovan Bratislava	Pogge	Arena Metallurg	6,370	3–1–1–5	
11	22	Salavat Yulaev Ufa	6–3	Slovan Bratislava	Pogge	Ufa Arena	6,537	3–1–1–6	
12	24	Traktor Chelyabinsk	1–3	Slovan Bratislava	Brust	Traktor Ice Arena	7,000	4–1–1–6	
13	30	(Croatia) Medveščak Zagreb	6–0	Slovan Bratislava	Brust, Pogge	Arena Zagreb	5,026	4–1–1–7	

October: 4–2–1–5 (Home: 2–1–1–2; Road: 2–1–0–3) Pts. 17

#	Date	Home team	Score	Away team	Decision	Arena	Attendance	Record	Recap
14	2	Slovan Bratislava	1–2 OT	CSKA Moscow	Brust	Ondrej Nepela Arena	10,055	4–1–2–7	
15	4	Slovan Bratislava	0–6	SKA Saint Petersburg	Brust	Ondrej Nepela Arena	10,055	4–1–2–8	
16	6	Slovan Bratislava	3–2	Severstal Cherepovets	Brust	Ondrej Nepela Arena	7,613	5–1–2–8	
17	10	Lokomotiv Yaroslavl	2–3 OT	Slovan Bratislava	Pogge	Arena 2000	7,986	5–2–2–8	
18	12	Dynamo Moscow	3–5	Slovan Bratislava	Brust	VTB Ice Palace	4,653	6–2–2–8	
19	14	Vityaz	3–2	Slovan Bratislava	Brust	Vityaz Ice Palace	3,250	6–2–2–9	
20	17	Slovan Bratislava	2–5	Neftekhimik Nizhnekamsk	Pogge, Brust	Ondrej Nepela Arena	7,576	6–2–2–10	
21	19	Slovan Bratislava	2–1 OT	Ak Bars Kazan	Brust	Ondrej Nepela Arena	8,187	6–3–2–10	
22	21	Slovan Bratislava	3–2	Lada Togliatti	Brust	Ondrej Nepela Arena	9,729	7–3–2–10	
23	25	SKA Saint Petersburg	6–1	Slovan Bratislava	Brust, Pogge	Ice Palace	11,981	7–3–2–11	
24	27	CSKA Moscow	4–2	Slovan Bratislava	Pogge	CSKA Ice Palace	3,300	7–3–2–12	
25	29	Severstal Cherepovets	1–3	Slovan Bratislava	Brust	Ice Palace	3,960	8–3–2–12	

November: 3–0–1–6 (Home: 1–0–1–2; Road: 2–0–0–4) Pts. 10

#	Date	Home team	Score	Away team	Decision	Arena	Attendance	Record	Recap
26	8	Avtomobilist Yekaterinburg	1–4	Slovan Bratislava	Pogge	KRK Uralets	3,700	9–3–2–12	
27	10	(Kazakhstan) Barys Astana	5–1	Slovan Bratislava	Pogge	Barys Arena	4,220	9–3–2–13	
28	12	HC Ugra	2–1	Slovan Bratislava	Brust	Arena Ugra	3,300	9–3–2–14	
29	15	Slovan Bratislava	2–1	(Finland) Jokerit	Brust	Ondrej Nepela Arena	10,055	10–3–2–14	
30	17	Slovan Bratislava	1–2 SO	(Latvia) Dinamo Riga	Brust	Ondrej Nepela Arena	10,055	10–3–3–14	
31	19	Slovan Bratislava	1–2	(Belarus) Dinamo Minsk	Brust	Ondrej Nepela Arena	10,055	10–3–3–15	
32	22	Sochi	3–0	Slovan Bratislava	Brust	Bolshoy Ice Dome	5,238	10–3–3–16	
33	24	Torpedo Nizhny Novgorod	1–4	Slovan Bratislava	Pogge	CEC Nagorny	5,500	11–3–3–16	
34	26	Spartak Moscow	4–2	Slovan Bratislava	Pogge	Luzhniki Small Arena	7,511	11–3–3–17	
35	30	Slovan Bratislava	2–5	Sibir Novosibirsk	Brust	Ondrej Nepela Arena	7,458	11–3–3–18	

December: 3–1–1–4 (Home: 2–1–1–2; Road: 1–0–0–2) Pts. 12

#	Date	Home team	Score	Away team	Decision	Arena	Attendance	Record	Recap
36	2	Slovan Bratislava	4–5 SO	Metallurg Novokuznetsk	Brust	Ondrej Nepela Arena	7,360	11–3–4–18	
37	3	Slovan Bratislava	3–5	Avangard Omsk	Pogge	Ondrej Nepela Arena	9,833	11–3–4–19	
38	6	(Belarus) Dinamo Minsk	4–1	Slovan Bratislava	Brust	Minsk-Arena	10,869	11–3–4–20	
39	8	(Finland) Jokerit	1–3	Slovan Bratislava	Pogge	Hartwall Arena	8,689	12–3–4–20	
40	10	(Latvia) Dinamo Riga	3–2	Slovan Bratislava	Pogge	Inbox.lv ledus halle	1,184	12–3–4–21	
41	20	Slovan Bratislava	4–1	Salavat Yulaev Ufa	Brust	Ondrej Nepela Arena	6,770	13–3–4–21	
42	21	Slovan Bratislava	1–0	Traktor Chelyabinsk	Brust	Ondrej Nepela Arena	6,844	14–3–4–21	
43	23	Slovan Bratislava	2–4	Metallurg Magnitogorsk	Pogge	Ondrej Nepela Arena	10,055	14–3–4–22	
44	26	Slovan Bratislava	5–4 SO	Spartak Moscow	Brust	Ondrej Nepela Arena	10,055	14–4–4–22	

January: 7–2–1–2 (Home: 4–2–1–0; Road: 3–0–0–2) Pts. 26

#	Date	Home team	Score	Away team	Decision	Arena	Attendance	Record	Recap
45	3	Slovan Bratislava	2–0	Amur Khabarovsk	Brust	Ondrej Nepela Arena	9,205	15–4–4–22	
46	5	Slovan Bratislava	1–2 OT	(China) Kunlun Red Star	Pogge	Ondrej Nepela Arena	10,055	15–4–5–22	
47	8	Slovan Bratislava	3–2	Admiral Vladivostok	Brust	Ondrej Nepela Arena	8,681	16–4–5–22	
48	11	Slovan Bratislava	3–2 OT	Avtomobilist Yekaterinburg	Brust	Ondrej Nepela Arena	7,624	16–5–5–22	
49	13	Slovan Bratislava	4–1	(Kazakhstan) Barys Astana	Brust	Ondrej Nepela Arena	9,566	17–5–5–22	
50	15	Slovan Bratislava	3–2	HC Ugra	Brust	Ondrej Nepela Arena	9,708	18–5–5–22	
51	17	Spartak Moscow	0–3	Slovan Bratislava	Brust	Luzhniki Small Arena	7,284	19–5–5–22	
52	19	Neftekhimik Nizhnekamsk	2–3	Slovan Bratislava	Brust	SCC Arena	5,300	20–5–5–22	
53	24	Amur Khabarovsk	1–2	Slovan Bratislava	Brust	Platinum Arena	7,000	21–5–5–22	
54	26	(China) Kunlun Red Star	2–0	Slovan Bratislava	Brust	LeSports Center	2,400	21–5–5–23	
55	28	Admiral Vladivostok	2–1	Slovan Bratislava	Brust	Fetisov Arena	5,841	21–5–5–24	
56	31	Slovan Bratislava	3–2 SO	Lokomotiv Yaroslavl	Brust	Ondrej Nepela Arena	10,055	21–6–5–24	

February: 1–1–0–2 (Home: 1–0–0–2; Road: 0–1–0–0) Pts. 5

#	Date	Home team	Score	Away team	Decision	Arena	Attendance	Record	Recap
57	2	Slovan Bratislava	1–2	Dynamo Moscow	Pogge	Ondrej Nepela Arena	10,055	21–6–5–25	
58	3	Slovan Bratislava	1–6	Vityaz	Brust	Ondrej Nepela Arena	10,055	21–6–5–26	
59	14	(Croatia) Medveščak Zagreb	4–5 OT	Slovan Bratislava	Brust, Pogge	Ondrej Nepela Arena	6,814	21–7–5–26	
60	15	Slovan Bratislava	7–5	(Croatia) Medveščak Zagreb	Pogge	Ondrej Nepela Arena	10,055	22–7–5–26	

Win (3 points) Overtime/shootout win (2 points) Overtime/shootout loss (1 point) Loss (0 points)

== Standings ==
=== Western Conference ===
Pos	Team	Pld	W	OTW	OTL	L	GF	GA	GD	Pts	Qualification
1	CSKA Moscow	60	41	3	8	8	183	110	+73	137	Advance to Gagarin Cup Playoffs (Note: Teams leading a division hold one of the first two places of their conference.)
2	SKA Saint Petersburg	60	39	7	6	8	249	114	+135	137	Advance to Gagarin Cup Playoffs
3	Dynamo Moscow	60	29	10	5	16	164	111	+53	112	Advance to Gagarin Cup Playoffs
4	Lokomotiv Yaroslavl	60	32	4	6	18	163	130	+33	110	Advance to Gagarin Cup Playoffs
5	Dinamo Minsk	60	27	10	4	19	171	150	+21	105	Advance to Gagarin Cup Playoffs
6	Torpedo Nizhny Novgorod	60	27	8	7	18	145	124	+21	104	Advance to Gagarin Cup Playoffs
7	Vityaz Podolsk	60	26	7	5	22	162	158	+4	97	Advance to Gagarin Cup Playoffs
8	Jokerit	60	23	6	12	19	149	165	−16	93	Advance to Gagarin Cup Playoffs
9	HC Sochi	60	24	7	2	27	139	145	−6	88	
10	Slovan Bratislava	60	22	7	5	26	144	166	−22	85	
11	Severstal Cherepovets	60	18	5	10	27	133	163	−30	74	
12	Medveščak Zagreb	60	19	4	4	33	138	186	−48	69	
13	Spartak Moscow	60	18	3	6	33	125	168	−43	66	
14	Dinamo Riga	60	11	10	5	34	116	158	−42	58	

Updated to match(es) played on 18 February 2017. Source: KHL
Rules for classification: 1) points; 2) a higher number of wins in the regular time; 3) a higher number of wins in overtime and shootouts; 4) goal difference; 5) number of goals scored; 6) drawing of lots.

== Team statistics ==
All statistics are for regular season only.

Statistic	Value
Matches played	60
Total points	85
Record	22–7–5–26
Score	144 – 166
Biggest win	7 – 4
Biggest defeat	0 – 6
Shots on goal %	7.82% (144/1841)
Shutouts	3
Penalty in minutes	918
Powerplay %	17.6% (40/227)
Penalty killing	83.3% (205/246)
Average attendance	8,804
Number of sold-out home games	12
Most consecutive wins (Note: Regular time wins.)	5 (Round 49 - Round 53)
Most consecutive wins + overtime wins	7 (Round 47 - Round 53)
Most consecutive undefeated matches (Note: Games without a regular time loss.)	10 (Round 44 - Round 53)
Most consecutive losses (Note: Regular time losses)	2 (multiple occasions)
Most consecutive losses + overtime losses	5 (Round 34 - Round 38)
Most consecutive matches without a win (Note: Games without a regular time win.)	6 (Round 54 - Round 59)
Longest time between scored goals	131:24 (Round 31 - Round 33)
Longest time without a conceded goal	111:25 (Round 45 - Round 46)

Notes

== Roster changes ==
=== Players Joining ===
Date	Player	Former team	Contract terms
2 May 2016	(Czech Republic) Radek Smoleňák	(Croatia) KHL Medveščak Zagreb	1 year
3 May 2016	(Canada) Justin Pogge	(Sweden) Färjestad BK	1 year
5 May 2016	(Czech Republic) Tomáš Kubalík	(Germany) ERC Ingolstadt	1 year
10 May 2016	(Canada) Jonathan Cheechoo	(Belarus) HC Dinamo Minsk	1 year

=== Players Leaving ===
Date	Player	New team	Contract terms

=== Player signings ===
This is the list of all players that extended their contracts with HC Slovan Bratislava:

Date	Player	Contract prolonged until

=== Players lost via retirement ===
Date	Player
30 April 2016	(Slovakia) Ľubomír Višňovský

== See also ==
- HC Slovan Bratislava all-time KHL record
- List of HC Slovan Bratislava seasons
