= Višňovský =

Višňovský (Czech/Slovak feminine: Višňovská) is a surname. Notable people with the surname include:

- Ľubomír Višňovský (born 1976), Slovak ice hockey player, brother of Tibor
- Tibor Višňovský (born 1974), Slovak ice hockey player
