= Tibor Višňovský =

Slovak ice hockey player

- Born: 20 October 1974 (age 50); Topoľčany, Czechoslovakia
- Position: Forward
- Shoots: Left
- Slovak Extraliga team: HK 36 Skalica

Tibor Višňovský (born 20 October 1974) is a Slovak professional ice hockey player who played with HC Slovan Bratislava in the Slovak Extraliga. His brother is Ľubomír Višňovský, ice hockey player with NHL experience.

He also played for VTJ Topoľčany, MHC Martin, Dukla Trenčín and HK 36 Skalica.
