= HC Slovan Bratislava all-time KHL record =

Ice hockey team record

The list below shows the all-time record of HC Slovan Bratislava in KHL against all opponents since they joined the league in 2012.

== Regular season record ==
This list includes regular season matches only.

As of 2 September 2017

Western Conference
Opponent	Home Record	Away Record	Total Record	Points	Goals scored	Goals allowed
Bobrov Division
Dinamo Minsk	3–2–0–3	0–1–1–5	3–3–1–8	16	37	42
Dinamo Riga	1–2–2–2	2–2–1–3	3–4–3–5	20	34	35
Jokerit	3–0–1–1	1–0–0–3	4–0–1–4	13	21	23
SKA Saint Petersburg	2–0–2–2	0–1–0–6	2–1–2–8	10	23	51
Spartak Moscow	0–2–0–3	2–1–0–2	2–3–0–5	12	23	28
–	–	–	–	–	–	–
–	–	–	–	–	–	–
Division total:	9–6–5–11	5–5–2–19	14–11–7–30	71	138	179
Tarasov Division
CSKA Moscow	0–1–1–3	2–0–0–3	2–1–1–6	9	19	38
Dynamo Moscow	0–0–0–5	3–0–1–2	3–0–1–7	10	25	35
HC Sochi	1–0–0–2	0–0–0–3	1–0–0–5	3	13	23
Lokomotiv Yaroslavl	2–1–0–2	1–1–0–4	3–2–0–6	13	20	29
Severstal Cherepovets	3–0–0–2	2–0–0–3	5–0–0–5	15	18	28
Torpedo Nizhny Novgorod	2–0–1–2	2–0–1–2	4–0–2–4	14	26	28
Vityaz Podolsk	2–0–0–3	2–1–1–1	4–1–1–4	15	22	22
Division total:	10–2–2–19	12–2–3–18	22–4–5–37	77	143	203
Conference total:	19–8–7–30	17–7–5–37	36–15–12–67	148	281	382

Eastern Conference
Opponent	Home Record	Away Record	Total Record	Points	Goals scored	Goals allowed
Kharlamov Division
Ak Bars Kazan	0–3–1–0	1–1–1–2	1–4–2–2	13	17	16
Avtomobilist Yekaterinburg	2–2–0–0	3–0–0–2	5–2–0–2	19	25	20
Lada Togliatti	1–0–1–1	1–0–0–2	2–0–1–3	7	16	20
Metallurg Magnitogorsk	0–2–0–2	2–0–0–3	2–2–0–5	10	24	32
Neftekhimik Nizhnekamsk	1–0–1–3	2–2–1–0	3–2–2–3	15	26	29
Traktor Chelyabinsk	2–1–0–1	1–1–0–3	3–2–0–4	13	21	21
Yugra Khanty-Mansiysk	2–2–0–0	1–2–0–2	3–4–0–2	17	26	16
Division total:	8–10–3–7	11–6–2–14	19–16–5–21	94	155	154
Chernyshev Division
Admiral Vladivostok	2–0–0–2	1–0–0–2	3–0–0–4	9	14	18
Amur Khabarovsk	3–0–0–2	2–1–0–1	5–1–0–3	17	20	16
Avangard Omsk	2–0–0–3	1–1–0–2	3–1–0–5	11	25	30
Barys Astana	4–0–0–1	1–0–1–3	5–0–1–4	16	29	38
Kunlun Red Star	0–0–1–0	0–0–0–1	0–0–1–1	1	1	4
Salavat Yulaev Ufa	1–3–1–0	0–0–1–3	1–3–2–3	11	22	24
Sibir Novosibirsk	2–1–0–3	1–0–2–2	3–1–2–5	13	23	26
Division total:	14–4–2–11	6–2–4–14	20–6–6–25	78	134	156
Conference total:	22–14–5–18	17–8–6–28	39–22–11–46	172	289	310

Record against teams not participating in the league in current season

Opponent	Home Record	Away Record	Total Record	Points	Goals scored	Goals allowed
Lev Praha	2–0–0–1	2–0–0–1	4–0–0–2	12	17	19
Donbass Donetsk	0–0–0–2	0–1–0–1	0–1–0–3	2	9	13
Atlant Mytishchi	1–1–1–1	3–0–0–1	4–1–1–2	15	18	15
Medveščak Zagreb	4–1–1–2	1–3–0–4	5–4–1–6	24	46	50
Metallurg Novokuznetsk	2–0–1–2	2–0–0–2	4–0–1–4	13	28	20
Total:	9–2–3–8	8–4–0–9	17–6–3–17	66	118	117

Positive record Equal record Negative record (Note: HC Slovan Bratislava has a negative record with a team when Slovan has gained less points than the opponent.)

Notes

- The division alignments are according to the most recent season.
- Due to frequent changes in KHL teams, Slovan did not play the same number of games against all teams.
- Owing to changes in playing formats, it is not necessary for Slovan to play the same number of home games and away games with some teams.

=== Overall regular season record ===
KHL total	Games	Home record	Away record	Total record	Points	GF	GA	PIM	PS	SOG	S%	PP%	PK%
2012–13	52	10–6–2–8	7–5–3–11	17–11–5–19	78	124	127	595	8–5	1,443	8.59	16.1	85.8
2013–14	54	8–6–2–11	7–3–2–15	15–9–4–26	67	120	160	613	6–3	1,471	8.16	15.7	85.2
2014–15	60	7–3–4–16	8–2–4–16	15–5–8–32	63	136	188	876	5–6	1,814	7.50	15.4	84.9
2015–16	60	11–4–3–12	10–7–1–12	21–11–4–24	89	154	148	840	8–1	1,977	7.79	16.7	86.2
2016–17	60	12–5–4–9	10–2–1–17	22–7–5–26	85	144	166	918	3–3	1,841	7.82	17.6	83.3
2017–18	56	11–2–6–9	4–1–1–22	15–3–7–31	58	119	187	979	2–2	1,654	7.19	21.1	80.3
6 seasons	342	59–26–21–65	46–20–12–93	105–46–33–158	441	797	976	4,821	32–20	10,218	7.80	17.0	84.2

Current season

== Play-off record ==
Western Conference
Opponent	Home Record	Away Record	Total Record	Goals scored	Goals allowed	Series
Dynamo Moscow	0–2	0–2	0–4	7	15	0 – 1
CSKA Moscow	0–2	0–2	0–4	4	10	0 – 1
Play-off Total	0–4	0–4	0–8	2	25	0 – 2

Positive record Equal record Negative record

=== Overall play-off record ===
KHL total	Games	Home record	Away record	Total record	GF	GA	PIM	OT	SOG	S%	PP%	PK%
2012–13	4	0–0–0–2	0–0–1–1	0–0–1–3	7	15	50	0–1	107	6.54	36.4	82.4
2015–16	4	0–0–0–2	0–0–1–1	0–0–1–3	4	10	102	0–1	98	4.08	8.3	90.0
2 seasons	8	0–0–0–4	0–0–2–2	0–0–2–6	11	25	152	0–2	205	5.37	21.7	86.5

== Nadezhda Cup record ==
Opponent	Home Record	Away Record	Total Record	Goals scored	Goals allowed	Series
Dinamo Minsk	0–0–1	0–0–1	0–0–2	1	3	0 – 1
Nadezhda Cup Total	0–0–1	0–0–1	0–0–2	1	3	0 – 1

Positive record Equal record Negative record

== See also ==
- 2012–13 HC Slovan Bratislava season
- 2013–14 HC Slovan Bratislava season
- 2014–15 HC Slovan Bratislava season
- 2015–16 HC Slovan Bratislava season
- 2016–17 HC Slovan Bratislava season
