= Daniel Sobotka =

Czech ice hockey player

- Born: August 15, 1992 (age 32); Prague, Czechoslovakia
- Height: 6 ft 6 in (198 cm)
- Weight: 198 lb (90 kg; 14 st 2 lb)
- Position: Defence
- Shot: Right
- Played for: HC Sparta Praha
- Playing career: 2011–2017

Daniel Sobotka (born August 15, 1992) is a Czech professional ice hockey player. He made his Czech Extraliga debut with HC Sparta Praha during the 2010–11 Czech Extraliga postseason.

== Career statistics ==
			Regular season					Playoffs
Season	Team	League	GP	G	A	Pts	PIM	GP	G	A	Pts	PIM
2007–08	HC Hradec Králové U18	Czech U18	41	3	10	13	60	—	—	—	—	—
2008–09	HC Sparta Praha U18	Czech U18	34	4	8	12	208	2	0	0	0	2
2008–09	HC Sparta Praha U20	Czech U20	2	0	0	0	2	—	—	—	—	—
2009–10	HC Sparta Praha U18	Czech U18	27	2	7	9	113	3	0	1	1	14
2009–10	HC Sparta Praha U20	Czech U20	16	1	2	3	22	—	—	—	—	—
2010–11	HC Sparta Praha U20	Czech U20	50	7	15	22	101	2	0	0	0	0
2011–12	HC Sparta Praha U20	Czech U20	14	5	4	9	42	4	0	0	0	6
2011–12	HC Berounští Medvědi	Czech2	35	0	6	6	67	—	—	—	—	—
2012–13	HC Sparta Praha	Czech	5	0	0	0	0	—	—	—	—	—
2012–13	HC Stadion Litoměřice	Czech2	34	3	2	5	48	—	—	—	—	—
2013–14	Mississippi RiverKings	SPHL	34	4	7	11	45	3	1	1	2	0
2013–14	St. Charles Chill	CHL	12	0	0	0	2	—	—	—	—	—
2014–15	Mississippi RiverKings	SPHL	55	1	7	8	79	5	0	2	2	0
2015–16	HC Benátky nad Jizerou	Czech2	9	0	0	0	32	—	—	—	—	—
2015–16	HC Slovan Ústí nad Labem	Czech2	26	4	7	11	88	2	0	3	3	2
2016–17	Macon Mayhem	SPHL	32	2	3	5	36	—	—	—	—	—
SPHL totals			121	7	17	24	160	8	1	3	4	0
