= Ville Hostikka =

Finnish ice hockey player

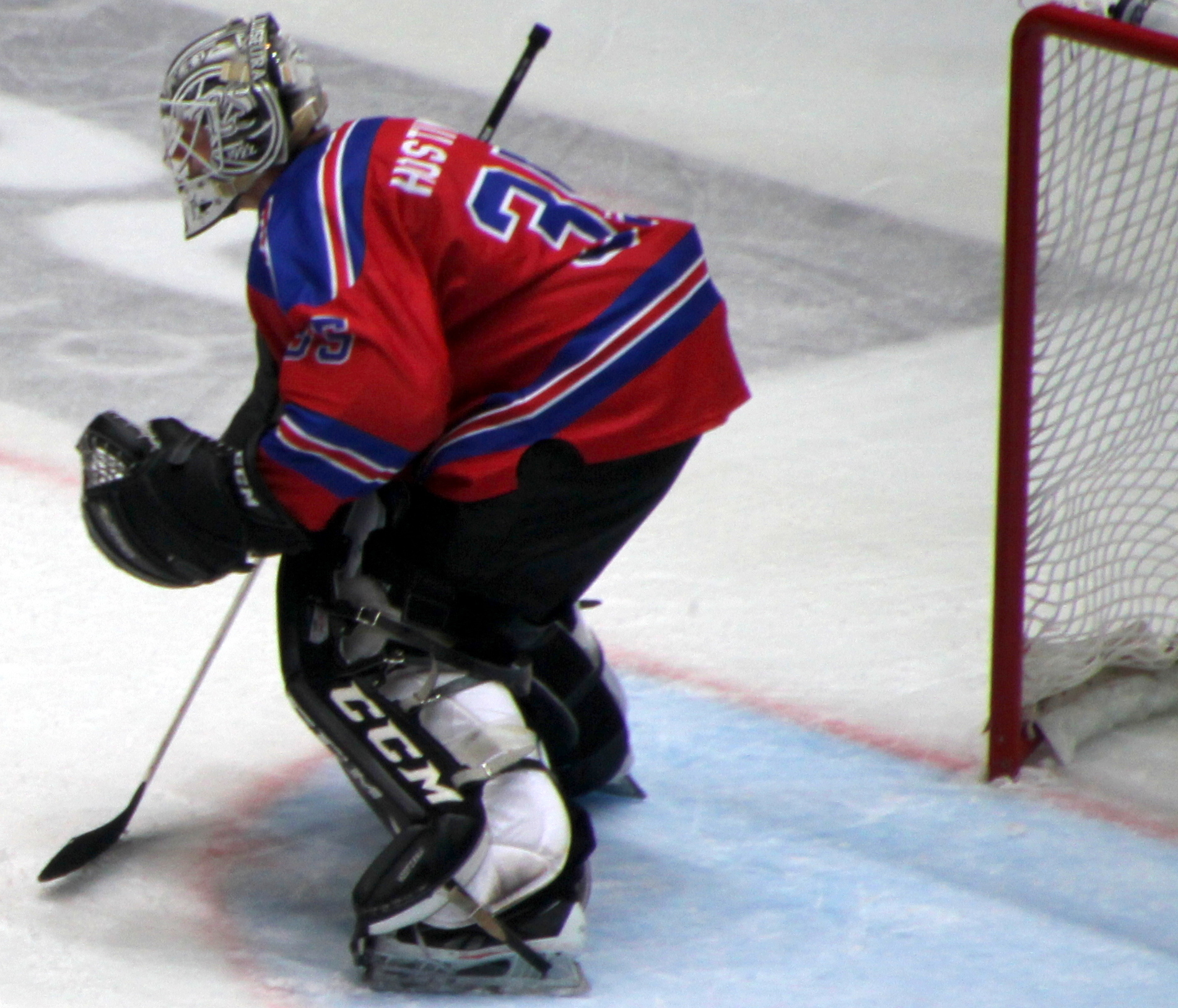
- Born: March 21, 1985 (age 41) Lappeenranta, Finland
- Height: 6 ft 3 in (191 cm)
- Weight: 198 lb (90 kg; 14 st 2 lb)
- Position: Goaltender
- Caught: Left
- Played for: SaiPa; KalPa; Oulun Kärpät; HC Slovan Bratislava; TPS; Vaasan Sport
- NHL draft: 193rd overall, 2003; Philadelphia Flyers
- Playing career: 2003–2016

Ville Hostikka (born March 21, 1985) is a Finnish former professional ice hockey goaltender who played in the Liiga and Kontinental Hockey League (KHL). He was drafted by the Philadelphia Flyers in the sixth round, 193rd overall, of the 2003 NHL entry draft.

== Career ==
Ville Hostikka had participated in as many as 17 games with SaiPa prior to the termination of an agreement on 9 November 2010. He also had played for such Finnish ice hockey teams as Forssa, KalPa, Lukko, Mestis and SaPKo as well as Austrian Feldkirch and Danish Frederikshavn White Hawks.

In the 2011 European Trophy, although he did not record any shutouts, Hostikka won the regulation round's goaltending league in save percentage for goaltenders who played at least 40% of the team's minutes, although his team, Oulun Kärpät, finished fifth in the East Division and missed the following playoffs.

He played one game for HC Slovan Bratislava of the KHL.

In 2013 he played only one full match in the regular season with JYP Jyvaskyla.
