= Ján Tabaček =

Slovak ice hockey player (born 1980)

- Born: 7 April 1980 (age 46) Martin, Czechoslovakia
- Height: 6 ft 0 in (183 cm)
- Weight: 198 lb (90 kg; 14 st 2 lb)
- Position: Defenceman
- Shot: Left
- Slovak 1. Liga team Former teams: HK Martin; MHC Martin; HC Slovan Bratislava; Cincinnati Mighty Ducks; HC Sparta Praha; HC Košice; Tappara; ZSC Lions; MHk 32 Liptovský Mikuláš
- National team: Slovakia
- NHL draft: 170th overall, 2001; Mighty Ducks of Anaheim
- Playing career: 1998–2021

Ján Tabaček (born 7 April 1980 in Martin) is a Slovak ice hockey player who is currently playing for HK Martin in the Slovak 1. Liga.

== Career statistics ==
			Regular season					Playoffs
Season	Team	League	GP	G	A	Pts	PIM	GP	G	A	Pts	PIM
1998–99	Martinskeho hokeja club	SVK	2	1	0	1	0	—	—	—	—	—
1999–2000	Martinskeho hokeja club	SVK.2	37	1	7	8	24	—	—	—	—	—
2000–01	Martinskeho hokeja club	SVK	44	8	5	13	62	3	1	2	3	0
2001–02	HC Slovan Bratislava	SVK	45	3	7	10	30	—	—	—	—	—
2002–03	Cincinnati Mighty Ducks	AHL	12	0	0	0	8	—	—	—	—	—
2002–03	Dayton Bombers	ECHL	2	0	1	1	16	—	—	—	—	—
2003–04	HC Slovan Bratislava	SVK	45	3	3	6	44	12	0	0	0	26
2004–05	HC Slovan Bratislava	SVK	53	8	10	18	59	19	1	2	3	40
2005–06	HC Sparta Praha	ELH	18	1	3	4	20	17	0	1	1	26
2006–07	HC Sparta Praha	ELH	48	2	3	5	58	16	0	0	0	34
2007–08	HC Sparta Praha	ELH	37	0	6	6	38	1	0	1	1	0
2008–09	HC Košice	SVK	50	5	22	27	93	16	4	5	9	14
2009–10	HC Košice	SVK	43	3	19	22	44	12	0	6	6	10
2010–11	HC Košice	SVK	57	6	30	36	48	14	1	5	6	18
2011–12	HC Košice	SVK	53	11	12	23	70	16	0	3	3	22
2012–13	HC Slovan Bratislava	KHL	43	1	10	11	26	2	0	0	0	0
2013–14	Tappara	Liiga	39	1	6	7	18	—	—	—	—	—
2013–14	LeKi	Mestis	1	0	0	0	2	—	—	—	—	—
2013–14	ZSC Lions	NLA	3	0	1	1	2	—	—	—	—	—
2014–15	ZSC Lions	NLA	11	0	1	1	0	—	—	—	—	—
2014–15	GCK Lions	SUI.2	22	2	9	11	16	—	—	—	—	—
2015–16	MHC Mountfield Martin	SVK	49	6	22	28	46	4	1	0	1	4
2016–17	MHC Martin	SVK	31	1	15	16	16	5	0	1	1	4
2017–18	MHk 32 Liptovský Mikuláš	SVK	49	3	12	15	12	—	—	—	—	—
2018–19	HK Martin	SVK.2	39	7	26	33	24	14	0	4	4	10
2019–20	HK Martin	SVK.2	32	3	11	14	12	—	—	—	—	—
2020–21	HK Martin	SVK.2	6	0	6	6	0	3	1	0	1	2
SVK totals			521	58	157	215	524	101	8	24	32	148
ELH totals			103	3	12	15	116	34	0	2	2	50
