= Juraj Šiška =

Slovak ice hockey player

- Born: May 17, 1996 (age 28); Nitra, Slovakia
- Height: 6 ft 3 in (191 cm)
- Weight: 207 lb (94 kg; 14 st 11 lb)
- Position: Forward
- Shoots: Left
- Slovak team Former teams: HK Poprad; HK Orange 20; HK Nitra; HC Slovan Bratislava; HC Nové Zámky; HKM Zvolen
- Playing career: 2012–present

Juraj Šiška (born 17 May 1996) is a Slovak professional ice hockey forward for HK Poprad of the Slovak Extraliga.

== Career ==
Šiška began his career with HK Nitra's academy and made his senior debut for the team during the 2012–13 season. He then went on to the Canadian Hockey League and was drafted 9th overall by the Saint John Sea Dogs of the Quebec Major Junior Hockey League in the 2013 CHL Import Draft. However, he would return to Slovakia to rehabilitate neck and back injuries and would eventually sit out the entire 2013–14 season. He spent the following season with the Sea Dogs before returning to Slovakia.

In the tail-end of the 2015–16 season, Šiška moved to HC Slovan Bratislava of the Kontinental Hockey League and would play 39 games for the team over parts of two seasons before rejoining HK Nitra in 2017.

== Career statistics ==
=== Regular season and playoffs ===
			Regular season					Playoffs
Season	Team	League	GP	G	A	Pts	PIM	GP	G	A	Pts	PIM

=== International ===
Year	Team	Event	Result	GP	G	A	Pts	PIM
2016	Slovakia	WJC	7th	5	1	1	2	4
Junior totals				5	1	1	2	4
