= Andrej Šťastný =

Slovak ice hockey player

- Born: January 24, 1991 (age 34); Považská Bystrica, Czechoslovakia
- Height: 6 ft 3.5 in (192 cm)
- Weight: 214 lb (97 kg; 15 st 4 lb)
- Position: Centre
- Shoots: Left
- Slovak team Former teams: HK Dukla Trenčín; HK Orange 20; HC Slovan Bratislava; HC '05 Banská Bystrica; HKM Zvolen; HK Nitra
- National team: Slovakia
- NHL draft: Undrafted
- Playing career: 2009–present

Andrej Šťastný (born 24 January 1991) is a Slovak professional ice hockey player who currently playing for HK Dukla Trenčín of the Slovak Extraliga.

== Playing career ==
Šťastný began playing junior ice hockey in his hometown club HK 95 Považská Bystrica. He also played junior hockey in MsHK Žilina and HK Dukla Trenčín. He was selected to the HK Orange 20 project to preparation for the World Junior Championship in 2010. He overall played 46 games and recorded 23 points for Orange 20 within two seasons. In 2010 he moved to North America to play for the WHL club Vancouver Giants. He recorded 30 points in 32 games in the 2010–11 WHL season. Before the 2011–12 season he came back to Slovakia, signing for HK Dukla Trenčín.

== International play ==
Šťastný participated at the 2010 World Junior Ice Hockey Championships and 2011 World Junior Ice Hockey Championships. He also played at the 2009 IIHF World U18 Championships.

== Career statistics ==
=== Regular season and playoffs ===
			Regular season					Playoffs
Season	Team	League	GP	G	A	Pts	PIM	GP	G	A	Pts	PIM
KHL totals			234	27	34	61	268	5	0	0	0	14
Slovak totals			195	40	73	113	217	28	5	3	8	46

=== International ===
Year	Team	Event	Result	GP	G	A	Pts	PIM
2008	Slovakia	U17	10th	5	1	0	1	2
2009	Slovakia	WJC18	7th	6	1	3	4	12
2010	Slovakia	WJC	8th	6	1	2	3	10
2011	Slovakia	WJC	8th	6	1	1	2	0
2014	Slovakia	WC	9th	6	0	0	0	2
2016	Slovakia	WC	9th	4	0	0	0	4
2017	Slovakia	WC	14th	6	0	0	0	2
Junior totals				23	4	6	10	24
Senior totals				16	0	0	0	8
