= Ján Lipiansky =

Ice hockey player (born 1974)

- Born: July 23, 1974 (age 51) Bratislava, Czechoslovakia
- Height: 6 ft 1 in (185 cm)
- Weight: 183 lb (83 kg; 13 st 1 lb)
- Position: Left wing
- Shot: Left
- Played for: HC Slovan Bratislava; HC Karlovy Vary; Ässät; Tappara; HC Vsetin; HC Kosice; HKM Zvolen; HK Nitra
- National team: Slovakia
- NHL draft: 270th overall, 1994; Philadelphia Flyers
- Playing career: 1992–2013

Ján Lipiansky (born July 23, 1974) is a former Slovak professional ice hockey player who played in the Czech Extraliga, Slovak Extraliga, Finnish Liiga, and Kontinental Hockey League.

== Career statistics ==
			Regular season					Playoffs
Season	Team	League	GP	G	A	Pts	PIM	GP	G	A	Pts	PIM
1992–93	HC Slovan Bratislava	Czech	13	0	0	0	—	—	—	—	—	—
1993–94	HC Slovan Bratislava	Slovak	33	11	5	16	—	—	—	—	—	—
1994–95	Hershey Bears	AHL	7	0	0	0	2	—	—	—	—	—
1994–95	HC Slovan Bratislava	Slovak	12	8	7	15	4	8	0	2	2	6
1995–96	HC Slovan Bratislava	Slovak	—	—	—	—	—	—	—	—	—	—
1996–97	HC Slovan Bratislava	Slovak	47	20	20	40	—	—	—	—	—	—
1997–98	HC Becherovka Karlovy Vary	Czech	19	4	3	7	6	—	—	—	—	—
1997–98	Ässät	Liiga	11	1	2	3	6	—	—	—	—	—
1997–98	Tappara	Liiga	3	0	0	0	0	—	—	—	—	—
1997–98	Kalix HF	Division 1	6	3	0	3	4	—	—	—	—	—
1998–99	HC Slovan Bratislava	Slovak	40	29	28	57	39	10	7	6	13	0
1999–00	HC Slovan Bratislava	Slovak	46	30	21	51	18	—	—	—	—	—
2000–01	HC Vsetin	Czech	49	12	11	23	39	13	2	2	4	2
2001–02	Ässät	Liiga	44	7	14	21	2	—	—	—	—	—
2001–02	HC Ambrì-Piotta	NLA	—	—	—	—	—	2	0	0	0	0
2002–03	HC Slovan Bratislava	Slovak	31	15	8	23	18	—	—	—	—	—
2002–03	Kassel Huskies	DEL	17	1	1	2	6	7	2	2	4	0
2003–04	HC Energie Karlovy Vary	Czech	43	9	11	20	14	—	—	—	—	—
2004–05	HC Energie Karlovy Vary	Czech	28	4	9	13	4	—	—	—	—	—
2004–05	HC Kosice	Slovak	11	1	5	6	4	10	8	7	15	6
2005–06	HC Kosice	Slovak	43	9	13	22	12	8	2	1	3	12
2006–07	HC Kosice	Slovak	49	15	18	33	24	11	2	3	5	2
2007–08	HKM Zvolen	Slovak	32	16	14	30	14	6	4	3	7	2
2007–08	HK Nitra	Slovak	10	3	2	5	4	—	—	—	—	—
2008–09	HKM Zvolen	Slovak	25	6	8	14	24	—	—	—	—	—
2008–09	HC Slovan Bratislava	Slovak	31	10	16	26	22	12	7	8	15	4
2009–10	HC Slovan Bratislava	Slovak	45	21	25	46	32	15	4	8	12	10
2010–11	HC Slovan Bratislava	Slovak	51	19	20	39	14	7	2	2	4	2
2011–12	HC Slovan Bratislava	Slovak	39	12	19	31	6	16	3	17	20	10
2012–13	HC Slovan Bratislava	KHL	41	5	10	15	37	2	0	0	0	2
Slovak totals			545	225	229	454	235	103	39	57	96	54
