= Patrik Luža =

Slovak ice hockey player

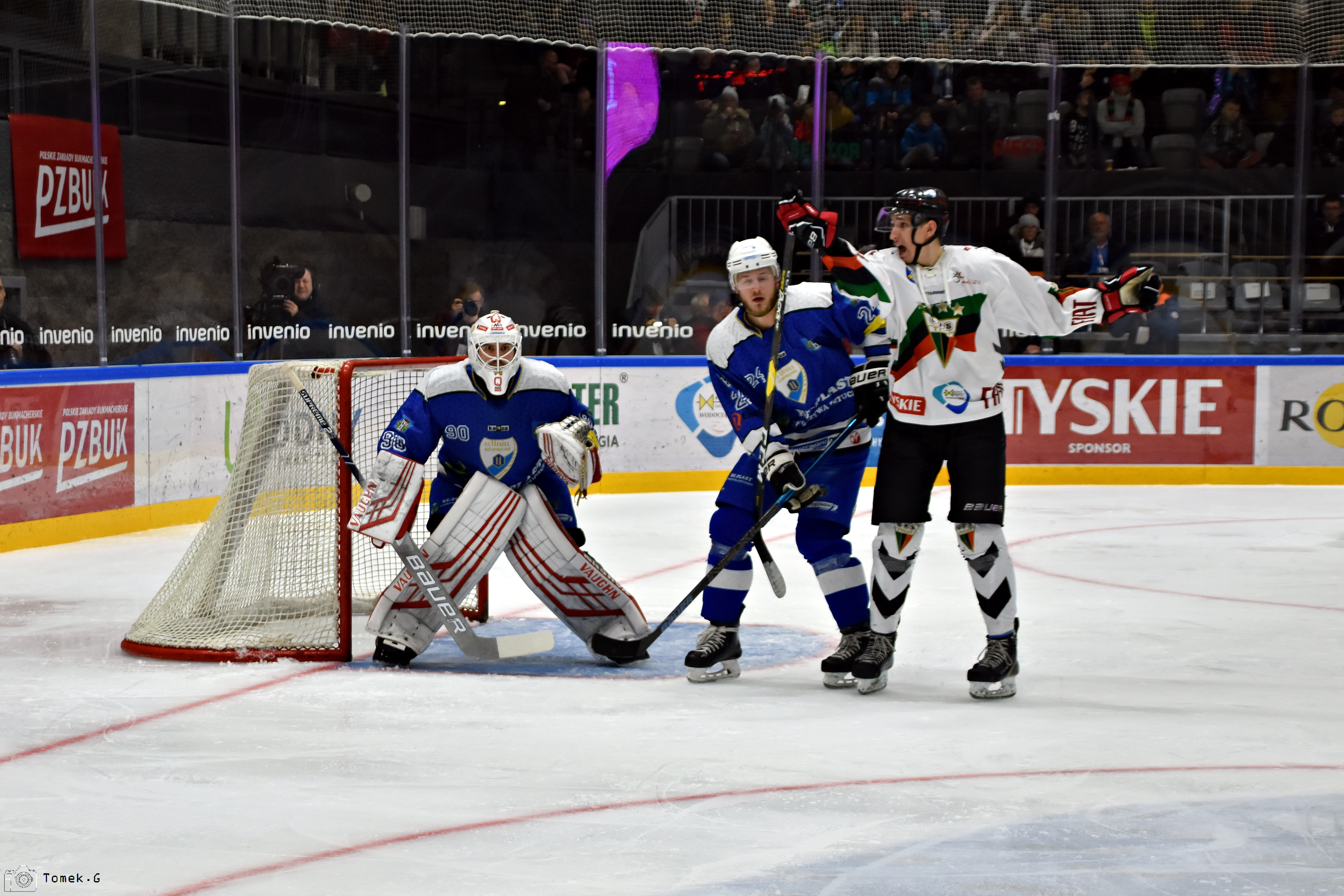
- Born: 27 July 1994 (age 31) Bratislava, Slovakia
- Height: 6 ft 0 in (183 cm)
- Weight: 194 lb (88 kg; 13 st 12 lb)
- Position: Defence
- Shoots: Right
- Hungary team Former teams: Újpesti TE; HK Orange 20; HC Slovan Bratislava; HK 36 Skalica; MHk 32 Liptovský Mikuláš; MsHK Žilina; AZ Havířov; HK Dukla Trenčín; Ritten Sport; TH Unia Oświęcim; Modré Krídla Slovan; HK Dukla Michalovce; HC '05 Banská Bystrica; HC Nové Zámky
- NHL draft: Undrafted
- Playing career: 2011–present

Patrik Luža (born 27 July 1994) is a Slovak professional ice hockey defenceman for Újpesti TE of the Erste Liga.

Luža previously played in the Slovak Extraliga for HC Slovan Bratislava, HK 36 Skalica, HK Dukla Michalovce, MHk 32 Liptovský Mikuláš, MsHK Žilina and HK Dukla Trenčín. He also played for Slovan Bratislava while they were members of the Kontinental Hockey League, playing 81 games in the KHL and scoring three goals and four assists.

On 27 July 2019 Luža signed for TH Unia Oświęcim of the Polska Hokej Liga.

== Career statistics ==
=== Regular season and playoffs ===
			Regular season					Playoffs
Season	Team	League	GP	G	A	Pts	PIM	GP	G	A	Pts	PIM

=== International ===
Year	Team	Event	Result	GP	G	A	Pts	PIM
