= Roman Stantien =

Slovak Olympic ice hockey player

- Born: October 16, 1964 (age 61) Kyjov, Czechoslovakia
- Height: 6 ft 0 in (183 cm)
- Weight: 183 lb (83 kg; 13 st 1 lb)
- Position: Centre
- Shot: Left
- National team: Slovakia
- Playing career: 1986–2009

Roman Stantien (born 16 October 1964) is a former Slovak professional ice hockey player, and later hockey coach. He played with HC Slovan Bratislava in the Slovak Extraliga.

He played also for HK Poprad, HC Dukla Trenčín, HC Vsetín, HC Vítkovice, Amur Khabarovsk and MsHK Žilina. He represented Slovakia at the 1998 Winter Olympics in Nagano. In 2009 he ended his active career.

== Career statistics ==
=== Regular season and playoffs ===
			Regular season					Playoffs
Season	Team	League	GP	G	A	Pts	PIM	GP	G	A	Pts	PIM
1986–87	ASVŠ Dukla Trenčín	TCH	3	0	0	0	0	—	—	—	—	—
1991–92	TJ ŠKP PS Poprad	TCH	36	11	16	27	—	—	—	—	—	—
1992–93	TJ ŠKP PS Poprad	TCH	44	14	12	26	57	—	—	—	—	—
1993–94	Dukla Trenčín	Slovak	43	12	18	30	—	—	—	—	—	—
1994–95	HC Dadák Vsetín	ELH	44	11	11	22	53	11	1	5	6	24
1995–96	HC Dadák Vsetín	ELH	40	7	9	16	20	13	2	5	7	8
1996–97	HC Petra Vsetín	ELH	50	9	15	24	26	10	2	1	3	10
1997–98	HC Petra Vsetín	ELH	34	9	10	19	62	10	1	2	3	34
1998–99	HC Slovnaft Vsetín	ELH	46	14	13	27	92	2	0	0	0	0
1999–2000	HC Slovnaft Vsetín	ELH	51	10	16	26	57	9	2	1	3	2
2000–01	HC Slovnaft Vsetín	ELH	50	17	15	32	69	12	2	1	3	20
2001–02	Amur Khabarovsk	RSL	25	3	1	4	16	—	—	—	—	—
2001–02	Samorodok Khabarovsk	RUS.3	1	0	0	0	0	—	—	—	—	—
2001–02	HC Vítkovice	ELH	13	3	2	5	6	5	0	2	2	2
2002–03	HC Vsetín	ELH	51	12	16	28	56	4	0	0	0	6
2003–04	Vsetínská hokejová	ELH	49	8	20	28	60	—	—	—	—	—
2004–05	Vsetínská hokejová	ELH	9	0	5	5	0	—	—	—	—	—
2004–05	HC Slovan Bratislava	Slovak	44	3	10	13	54	13	2	1	3	12
2005–06	Vsetínská hokejová	ELH	45	8	9	17	75	—	—	—	—	—
2006–07	Vsetínská hokejová	ELH	42	8	7	15	34	—	—	—	—	—
2006–07	HC Mountfield	ELH	8	1	1	2	6	11	0	1	1	10
2007–08	MsHK Žilina	Slovak	53	9	23	32	46	4	1	1	2	2
2008–09	MsHK Žilina	Slovak	23	8	11	19	26	—	—	—	—	—
2008–09	HK Aquacity ŠKP Poprad	Slovak	14	1	6	7	6	—	—	—	—	—
TCH totals			83	25	28	53	—	—	—	—	—	—
Slovak totals			177	33	68	101	132	17	3	2	5	14
ELH totals			532	117	149	266	616	87	10	18	28	116

=== International ===
Year	Team	Event	GP	G	A	Pts	PIM
1997	Slovakia	WC	8	2	0	2	2
1998	Slovakia	OG	4	0	0	0	0
1998	Slovakia	WC	6	0	0	0	0
Senior totals			18	2	0	2	2
