= Ice Sports Palace Sibir =

Sporting arena in Novosibirsk, Russia

Coordinates: 55.071700°N 82.943225°E

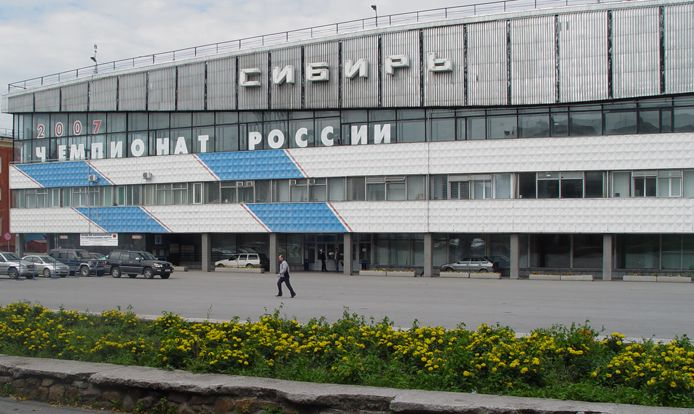
- Interactive map of Ice Sports Palace Sibir
- Location: Novosibirsk, Novosibirsky, Russia
- Capacity: 7 400

Construction
- Opened: September 1964

Tenants
- HC Sibir Novosibirsk (KHL) (1964-2023); Sibirskie Snaypery (MHL) (2009-2023)

Ice Sports Palace Sibir is an indoor sporting arena located in Novosibirsk, Russia. The capacity of the arena is 7,400. It was the home arena of the HC Sibir Novosibirsk ice hockey team.

== See also ==
- List of indoor arenas in Russia
- List of Kontinental Hockey League arenas
