= Ivan Švarný =

Slovak ice hockey player

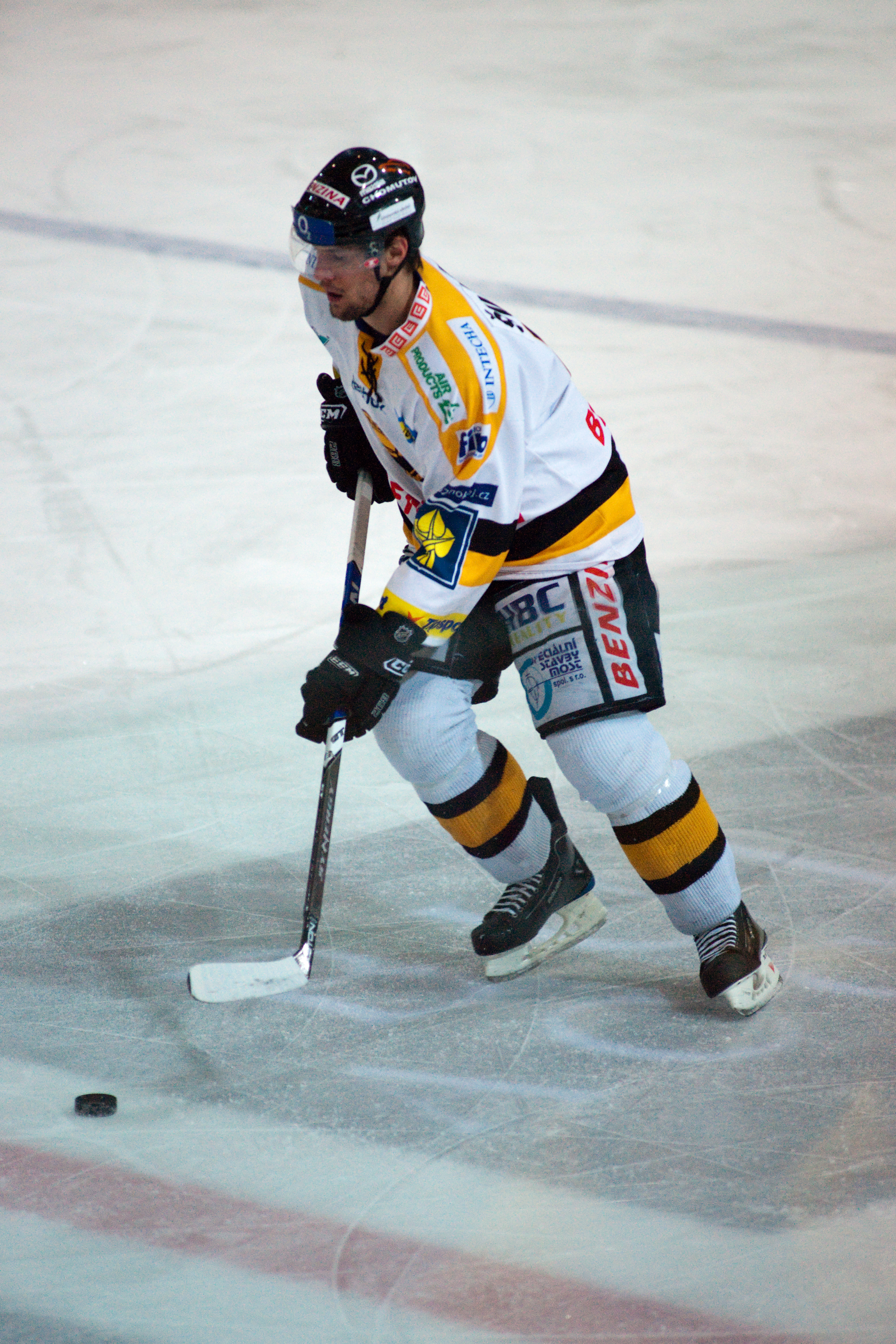
- Born: 30 October 1984 (age 40); Nitra, Czechoslovakia
- Height: 6 ft 2 in (188 cm)
- Weight: 209 lb (95 kg; 14 st 13 lb)
- Position: Defence
- Shoots: Left
- team Former teams: Free agent HK Nitra; HC Oceláři Třinec; HC Litvínov; HC Slovan Bratislava; KHL Medveščak Zagreb; Dinamo Minsk; Oulun Kärpät; HKM Zvolen
- National team: Slovakia
- NHL draft: Undrafted
- Playing career: 2004–present

Ivan Švarný (born 30 October 1984) is a Slovak ice hockey player. He is currently a free agent.

== Career ==
He has previously played in the KHL for KHL Medveščak Zagreb and Dinamo Minsk. He played for the Slovakia men's national ice hockey team at the 2009 IIHF World Championship.

== Career statistics ==
=== Regular season and playoffs ===
			Regular season					Playoffs
Season	Team	League	GP	G	A	Pts	PIM	GP	G	A	Pts	PIM
