= Arena 2000 =

Indoor arena in Yaroslavl, Russia

Coordinates: 57°35′22″N 39°50′55″E

Arena 2000 Lokomotiv
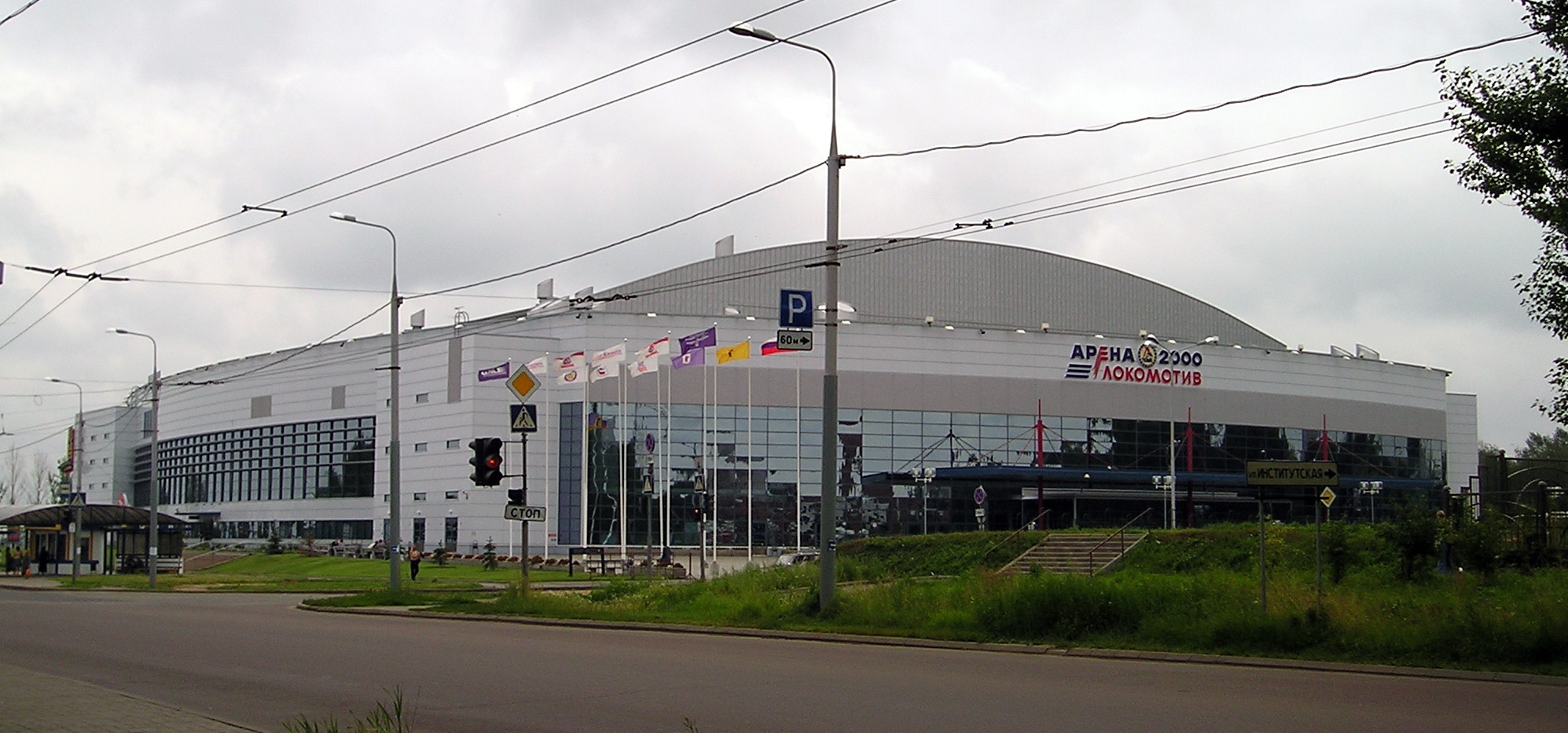
- Interactive map of Arena 2000 Lokomotiv
- Location: Yaroslavl, Russia
- Owner: RZhD
- Capacity: Hockey: 8,445; Concert: 8,200

Construction
- Groundbreaking: 1998
- Opened: October 12, 2001
- Cost: $62 million
- Architect: Skanska

Tenant
- Lokomotiv Yaroslavl (KHL)

Arena 2000 (Russian: Универсальный Культурно-Спортивный Комплекс Арена-2000) is an arena, in Yaroslavl, Russia. It opened in 2001 and holds approximately 9,000 people. It is primarily used for ice hockey and is the home arena for Lokomotiv Yaroslavl team. It is also used for concerts, exhibitions and as a skating rink. It hosted the 2003 IIHF World U18 Championships.

== See also ==
- List of indoor arenas in Russia
