= Martin Štajnoch =

Slovak ice hockey player

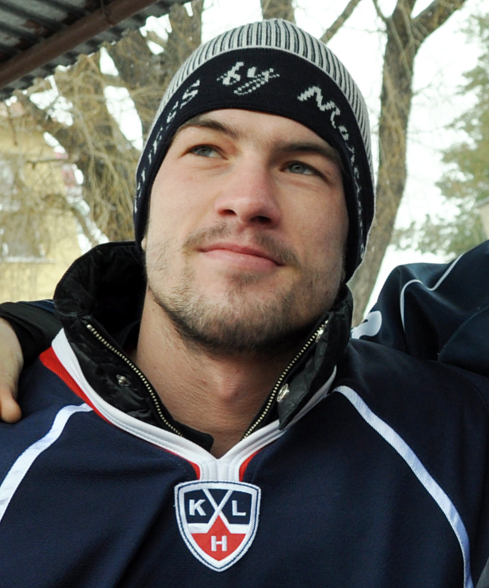
- Born: 15 September 1990 (age 35) Bojnice, Czechoslovakia
- Height: 6 ft 0 in (183 cm)
- Weight: 203 lb (92 kg; 14 st 7 lb)
- Position: Defenceman
- Shoots: Right
- ICEHL team Former teams: EC Red Bull Salzburg; MHC Prievidza; HC Slovan Bratislava; HK Orange 20; HC Dynamo Pardubice; Mountfield HK; HC Yugra; Nürnberg Ice Tigers; Black Wings Linz; HK Dukla Michalovce
- Playing career: 2009–present

Martin Štajnoch (born 15 September 1990) is a Slovak professional ice hockey defenceman currently playing for EC Red Bull Salzburg of the ICE Hockey League.

== Playing career ==
He played for the Thomas Sabo Ice Tigers of the Deutsche Eishockey Liga (DEL). He has formerly played in the Kontinental Hockey League (KHL) with HC Slovan Bratislava and HC Yugra.

During his second season in 2018–19 with Austrian club, EC Red Bull Salzburg of the EBEL, Štajnoch left nearing the completion of the regular season having appeared in 42 games, to join neighbouring league the DEL with the Thomas Sabo Ice Tigers for the remainder of the campaign on February 14, 2019. He registered 2 assists in 5 playoff contests.

== Career statistics ==
=== Regular season and playoffs ===
			Regular season					Playoffs
Season	Team	League	GP	G	A	Pts	PIM	GP	G	A	Pts	PIM
2019–20	HC Slovan Bratislava	Slovak	48	9	14	23	28	—	—	—	—	—
2020–21	HC Slovan Bratislava	Slovak	48	5	17	22	40	10	0	1	1	6
2021–22	HC Slovan Bratislava	Slovak	13	0	2	2	2	—	—	—	—	—
2021–22	Black Wings Linz	ICEHL	17	1	1	2	2	—	—	—	—	—
2022–23	HK Dukla Michalovce	Slovak	27	1	3	4	10	—	—	—	—	—
Slovak totals			275	24	62	86	299	56	5	7	12	44

=== International ===
Year	Team	Event	Result	GP	G	A	Pts	PIM
2008	Slovakia	WJC18	7th	6	1	3	4	10
2009	Slovakia	WJC	4th	7	1	3	4	6
2010	Slovakia	WJC	8th	4	0	0	0	4
Junior totals				17	2	6	8	20

== Awards and honours ==
Award	Year
Slovak Extraliga
Champion	2012
