= Ľubomír Višňovský =

Slovak ice hockey player (born 1976)

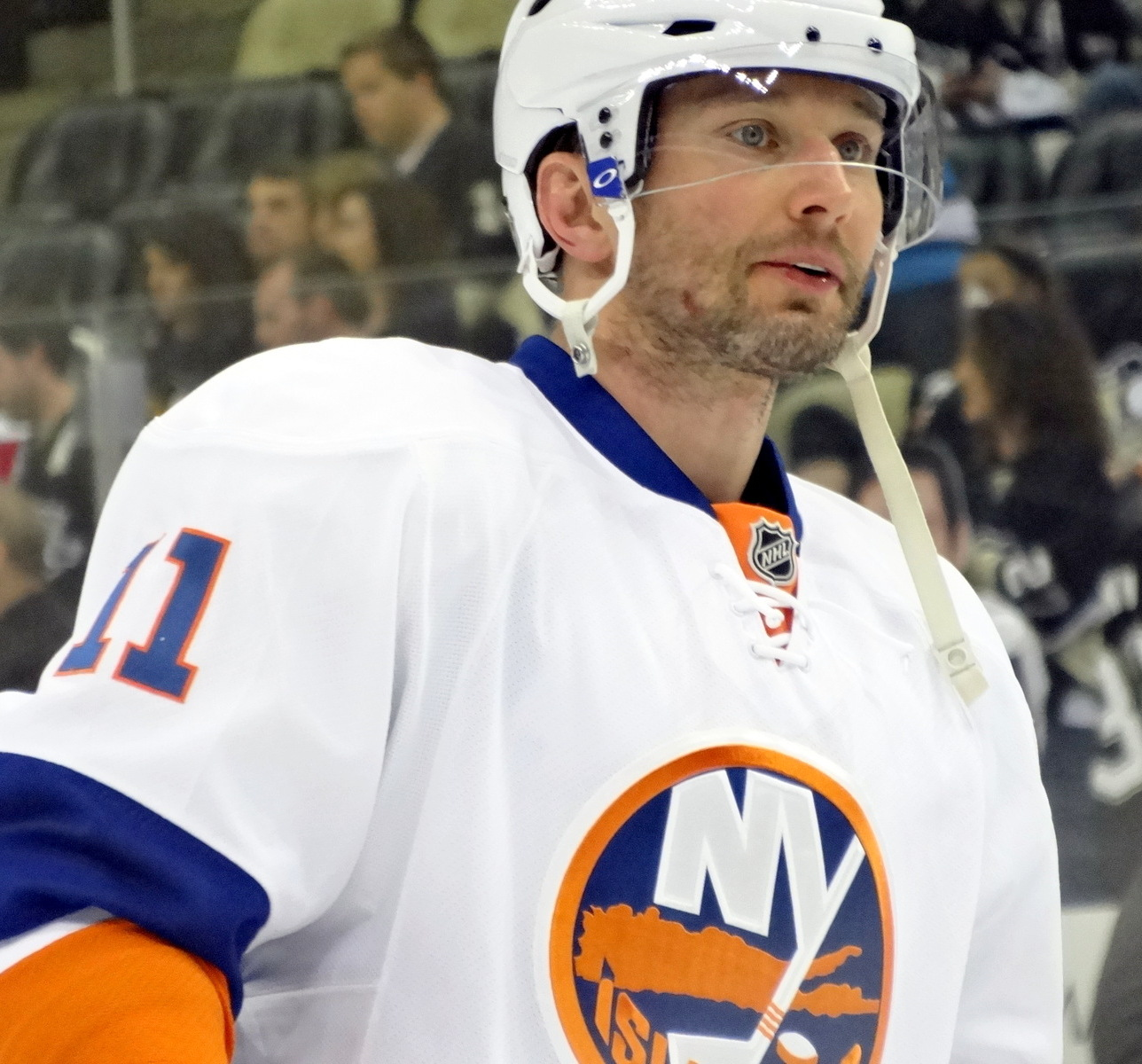
- Višňovský with the New York Islanders in 2013
- Born: 11 August 1976 (age 50) Topoľčany, Czechoslovakia
- Height: 5 ft 10 in (178 cm)
- Weight: 192 lb (87 kg; 13 st 10 lb)
- Position: Defence
- Shot: Left
- Played for: HC Slovan Bratislava; Los Angeles Kings; Edmonton Oilers; Anaheim Ducks; New York Islanders
- National team: Slovakia
- NHL draft: 118th overall, 2000; Los Angeles Kings
- Playing career: 1994–2016

Ľubomír Višňovský (Slovak pronunciation: [ˈʎubɔmiːr ˈʋiʂɲɔwskiː]; born 11 August 1976) is a Slovak former professional ice hockey defenceman. He began and finished his professional career with HC Slovan Bratislava. He played 14 seasons in the National Hockey League (NHL) with the Los Angeles Kings, Edmonton Oilers, Anaheim Ducks, and New York Islanders.

== Playing career ==
Prior to joining the NHL, Višňovský played with HC Slovan Bratislava. He was drafted 118th overall in the 2000 NHL entry draft by the Los Angeles Kings as their fourth choice. He made the team for the 2000–01 season and was named to the NHL All-Rookie Team after a 39-point campaign, tops among rookie defencemen. Višňovský remained with the Kings for seven seasons, recording a career-high 67 points in 2005–06 and being named to the 2007 NHL All-Star Game. He returned to play in his home country for the locked out 2004–05 season.

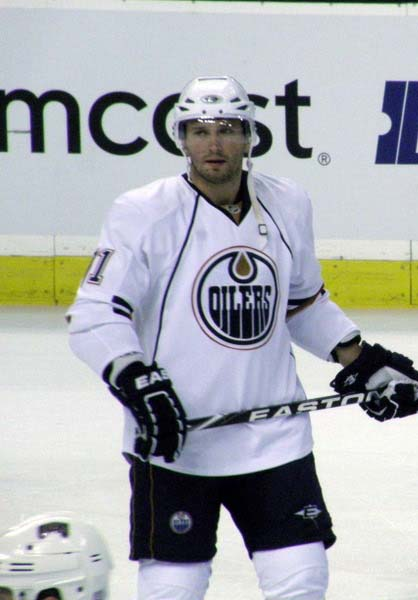
Višňovský with the Edmonton Oilers in 2009

On 29 June 2008, Višňovský was traded to the Edmonton Oilers in exchange for forward Jarret Stoll and defenceman Matt Greene, on the day before his no-trade clause would take effect. He was put on the injured reserve on 5 February 2009, after dislocating his shoulder in a game against the Chicago Blackhawks on 3 February. It was later revealed Višňovský required season-ending surgery to repair his labrum.

On 3 March 2010, Višňovský was traded to the Anaheim Ducks for Ryan Whitney and a sixth-round pick in the 2010 NHL entry draft. On 4 March 2011, Višňovský scored the first hat trick by a defenceman in Anaheim Ducks history, the third goal coming with four seconds left in overtime.

On 22 June 2012, Višňovský was traded to the New York Islanders for a second round pick in the 2013 NHL entry draft. Shortly thereafter, Višňovský filed a grievance through the National Hockey League Players' Association (NHLPA) seeking to void the trade, claiming that the no-trade clause in his original contract with Los Angeles was still valid, since he never revoked it when Edmonton traded him to Anaheim. An arbitrator ruled against Višňovský in this case and the trade was upheld.

The Islanders suspended Višňovský because he did not report to the team for the start of the NHL season. His agent, Neil Sheehy, said on 26 January 2013, that Višňovský will report to the team by 11 February. Višňovský later signed a two-year extension with the Islanders worth $4.75 million per year.

After parts of three seasons with the Islanders, Višňovský left as a free agent and was unsigned over the summer. On 16 September 2015, he was signed to a professional tryout (PTO) contract with the Chicago Blackhawks. Upon his release at the conclusion of training camp by the Blackhawks, Višňovský returned to HC Slovan Bratislava midway into the 2015–16 season, signing a one-year deal on 27 October 2015. Višňovský announced his retirement in March 2016.

== Career statistics ==
=== Regular season and playoffs ===
			Regular season					Playoffs
Season	Team	League	GP	G	A	Pts	PIM	GP	G	A	Pts	PIM
1994–95	HC Slovan Bratislava	Slovak	36	11	10	21	10	9	1	3	4	2
1995–96	HC Slovan Bratislava	Slovak	35	8	6	14	22	13	1	5	6	2
1996–97	HC Slovan Bratislava	Slovak	44	11	12	23	20	2	0	1	1	2
1997–98	HC Slovan Bratislava	Slovak	36	7	9	16	16	11	2	4	6	8
1998–99	HC Slovan Bratislava	Slovak	40	9	10	19	31	10	5	5	10	0
1999–00	HC Slovan Bratislava	Slovak	52	21	24	45	38	8	5	3	8	16
2000–01	Los Angeles Kings	NHL	81	7	32	39	36	8	0	0	0	0
2001–02	Los Angeles Kings	NHL	72	4	17	21	14	4	0	1	1	0
2002–03	Los Angeles Kings	NHL	57	8	16	24	28	—	—	—	—	—
2003–04	Los Angeles Kings	NHL	58	8	21	29	26	—	—	—	—	—
2004–05	HC Slovan Bratislava	Slovak	43	13	25	38	40	14	2	10	12	10
2005–06	Los Angeles Kings	NHL	80	17	50	67	42	—	—	—	—	—
2006–07	Los Angeles Kings	NHL	69	18	40	58	26	—	—	—	—	—
2007–08	Los Angeles Kings	NHL	82	8	33	41	34	—	—	—	—	—
2008–09	Edmonton Oilers	NHL	50	8	23	31	30	—	—	—	—	—
2009–10	Edmonton Oilers	NHL	57	10	22	32	16	—	—	—	—	—
2009–10	Anaheim Ducks	NHL	16	5	8	13	4	—	—	—	—	—
2010–11	Anaheim Ducks	NHL	81	18	50	68	24	6	0	3	3	2
2011–12	Anaheim Ducks	NHL	68	6	21	27	7	—	—	—	—	—
2012–13	HC Slovan Bratislava	KHL	32	6	10	16	22	—	—	—	—	—
2012–13	New York Islanders	NHL	35	3	11	14	20	6	0	2	2	2
2013–14	New York Islanders	NHL	24	3	8	11	10	—	—	—	—	—
2014–15	New York Islanders	NHL	53	5	15	20	8	4	0	2	2	0
2015–16	HC Slovan Bratislava	KHL	9	2	8	10	2	4	0	0	0	0
Slovak totals			286	80	98	178	157	67	16	31	47	38
NHL totals			883	128	367	495	373	28	0	8	8	4

=== International ===
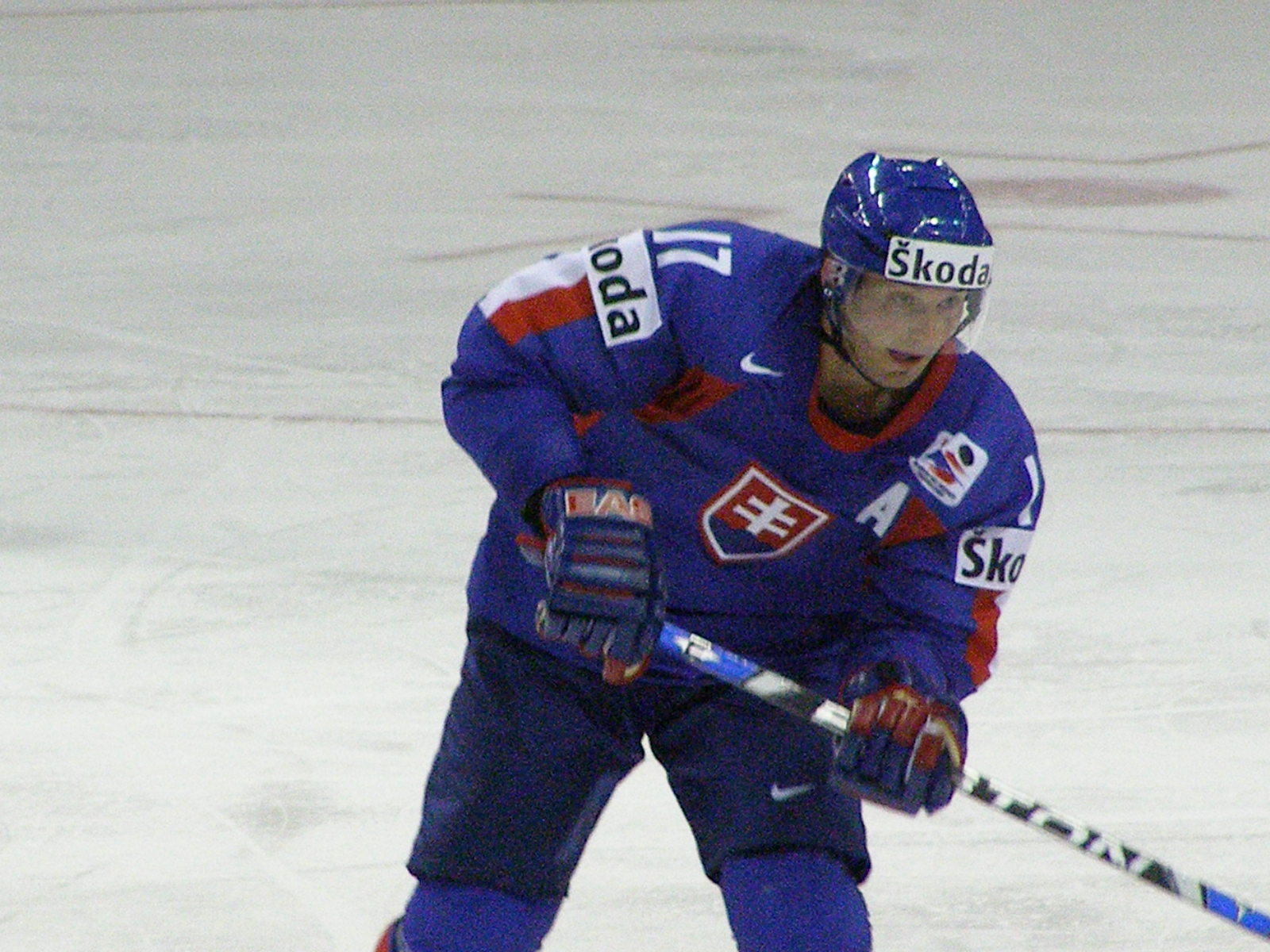
- Višňovský at the 2008 World Championships

Medal record

Representing Slovakia

Ice hockey

World Championships
Bronze medal – third place	2003 Helsinki	
Gold medal – first place	2002 Gothenburg	
Silver medal – second place	2000 St. Petersburg	

Inline Hockey

World Championships
Silver medal – second place	2008 Bratislava	

Year	Team	Event	Result	GP	G	A	Pts	PIM
1994	Slovakia	WJC C	17th	4	1	1	2	0
1995	Slovakia	WJC B	10th	7	1	6	7	4
1996	Slovakia	WJC	7th	6	1	5	6	4
1996	Slovakia	WC	10th	5	0	1	1	4
1996	Slovakia	WCH	7th	1	0	0	0	0
1997	Slovakia	WC	9th	8	0	1	1	4
1998	Slovakia	OG	10th	3	0	0	0	2
1998	Slovakia	WC	7th	4	0	0	0	2
1999	Slovakia	WC	7th	6	0	2	2	6
2000	Slovakia	WC	2nd place, silver medalist(s)	9	0	6	6	2
2002	Slovakia	OG	13th	3	1	2	3	0
2002	Slovakia	WC	1st place, gold medalist(s)	5	2	1	3	2
2003	Slovakia	WC	3rd place, bronze medalist(s)	9	4	8	12	2
2004	Slovakia	WCH	7th	4	0	0	0	6
2005	Slovakia	WC	5th	7	2	6	8	0
2006	Slovakia	OG	5th	6	1	1	2	0
2008	Slovakia	WC	13th	5	2	7	9	0
2010	Slovakia	OG	4th	7	2	1	3	0
2011	Slovakia	WC	10th	3	0	2	2	0
Junior totals				17	3	12	15	8
Senior totals				85	14	38	52	30

== Awards and honours ==
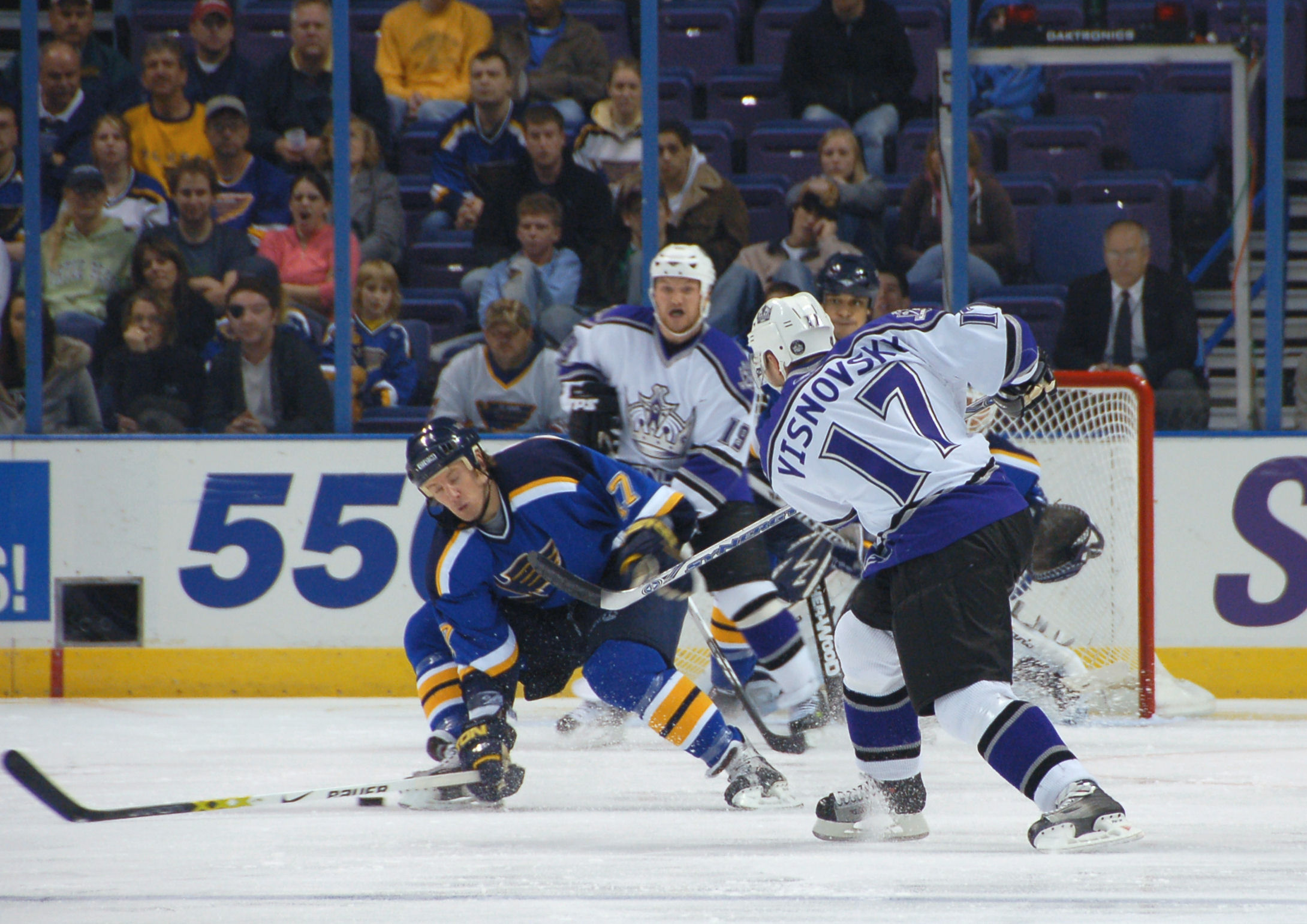
Višňovský (shown here in 2006) was named to the NHL All-Star Game in 2007.

Award	Year
Slovakia
Best Defenceman in Slovakia	1999, 2000, 2001, 2002, 2003, 2005
Best Player in Slovakia	2005
NHL
All-Rookie Team	2001
All-Star Game	2007
NHL second All-Star team	2011
