= 2014–15 HC Slovan Bratislava season =

2014–15 HC Slovan Bratislava
- Division: 7th Bobrov
- Conference: 14th Western
- 2014–15 record: 15–5–8–32
- Home record: 7–3–4–16
- Road record: 8–2–4–16
- Goals for: 136
- Goals against: 188

Team information
- General manager: Maroš Krajči
- Coach: Rostislav Čada (Sep 2014) (Slovakia) Vladimír Országh (caretaker manager) (Finland) Petri Matikainen (Sep 2014 – Apr 2015)
- Assistant coach: Vladimír Országh
- Captain: Milan Bartovič
- Alternate captains: Ladislav Nagy (Slovakia) Michal Sersen
- Arena: Slovnaft Arena
- Average attendance: 8,975 (89.26%) ▼

Team leaders
- Goals: (Slovakia) Ladislav Nagy (23)
- Assists: (Slovenia) Rok Tičar (19)
- Points: (Slovakia) Ladislav Nagy (40)
- Penalty minutes: (Slovakia) Michal Sersen (79)
- Plus/minus: (Slovenia) Žiga Jeglič (+4)
- Wins: (Sweden) Johan Backlund (9)
- Goals against average: (Sweden) Johan Backlund (2.64)

The 2014–15 HC Slovan Bratislava season was the third season for Bratislava-based club in Kontinental Hockey League. Slovan started the season with a series of three wins, which was the best start since Slovan joined the KHL. Then, after a series of three games without a win the head coach Rostislav Čada asked for release from his contract, which was accepted by Slovan's executives. In the following home game against CSKA Moscow the team was led by Vladimír Országh, former assistant coach. On September 23 it was announced that Finnish coach Petri Matikainen would lead Slovan until the end of the season.

== Schedule and results ==
=== Pre-season ===
Pre-season schedule was announced on June 16, 2014.

2014–15 Game Log
Pre-season: 2–4–2–2 (Home: 0–0–1–1; Road: 1–2–0–0; Neutral: 1–2–1–1)

#	Date	Home team	Score	Away team	Arena	Attendance	Recap
1	July 22	(Russia) Metallurg Novokuznetsk	2 – 3 OT	Slovan Bratislava	Tipsport Arena, Liberec	N/A	
2	August 1	(Belarus) Dinamo Minsk	6–0	Slovan Bratislava	Buly Arena Kravaře	N/A	
3	August 6	(Slovakia) HC Košice	1–3	Slovan Bratislava	Steel Aréna	8,347	
4	August 8	Slovan Bratislava	1–2	Amur Khabarovsk (Russia)	Slovnaft Arena	7,339	
5	August 14	(Russia) Vityaz Podolsk	3 – 2 SO	Slovan Bratislava	Centro Sportivo, Bellinzona	N/A	
6	August 16	(Switzerland) HC Lugano	2 – 3 SO	Slovan Bratislava	Pista La Resega	~ 3,000	
7	August 17	(Russia) CSKA Moscow	2 – 3 OT	Slovan Bratislava	Sportzentrum Herisau	N/A	
8	August 22	(Slovakia) HC '05 Banská Bystrica	1–4	Slovan Bratislava	Aréna Brezno (Note: The match was relocated due to a reconstruction taking place at Banská Bystrica Ice Stadium.)	~ 3,000	
9	August 26	(Czech Republic) Kometa Brno	2 – 3 SO (Note: No overtime was played. The shootout followed immediately after regular time.)	Slovan Bratislava	Kajot Arena	6,744	
10	August 28	Slovan Bratislava	1 – 2 OT	HC Vítkovice (Czech Republic)	Slovnaft Arena	4,544	

Win Overtime/shootout win Overtime/shootout loss Loss

=== Regular season ===
2014–15 Game Log
September: 4–1–1–4 (Home: 1–1–1–3; Road: 3–0–0–1) Pts. 15

#	Date	Home team	Score	Away team	Arena	Attendance	Record	Recap
1	4	Slovan Bratislava	5–2	Medveščak Zagreb (Croatia)	Slovnaft Arena	10,055	1–0–0–0	
2	6	Metallurg Magnitogorsk	2–3	Slovan Bratislava	Magnitogorsk Arena	6,614	2–0–0–0	
3	8	Avtomobilist Yekaterinburg	1–3	Slovan Bratislava	KRK Uralets	2,500	3–0–0–0	
4	10	Ak Bars Kazan	4–3	Slovan Bratislava	TatNeft Arena	6,248	3–0–0–1	
5	14	Slovan Bratislava	2 – 3 SO	Torpedo Nizhny Novgorod	Slovnaft Arena	10,055	3–0–1–1	
6	16	Slovan Bratislava	0–3	Severstal Cherepovets	Slovnaft Arena	8,832	3–0–1–2	
7	20	Slovan Bratislava	1–4	CSKA Moscow	Slovnaft Arena	10,055	3–0–1–3	
8	24	Slovan Bratislava	1–4	Medveščak Zagreb (Croatia)	Slovnaft Arena	7,985	3–0–1–4	
9	26	(Croatia) Medveščak Zagreb	1–3	Slovan Bratislava	Dom Sportova	5,800	4–0–1–4	
10	29	Slovan Bratislava	3 – 2 SO	Dinamo Minsk (Belarus)	Slovnaft Arena	8,025	4–1–1–4	

October: 4–1–0–7 (Home: 1–0–0–3; Road: 3–1–0–4) Pts. 14

#	Date	Home team	Score	Away team	Arena	Attendance	Record	Recap
11	1	Slovan Bratislava	5–1	Dinamo Riga (Latvia)	Slovnaft Arena	8,611	5–1–1–4	
12	6	SKA Saint Petersburg	7–2	Slovan Bratislava	Ice Palace	11,589	5–1–1–5	
13	8	(Latvia) Dinamo Riga	1–4	Slovan Bratislava	Arena Riga	3,550	6–1–1–5	
14	10	(Belarus) Dinamo Minsk	4–1	Slovan Bratislava	Minsk-Arena	14,755	6–1–1–6	
15	12	Slovan Bratislava	2–4	Jokerit Helsinki (Finland)	Slovnaft Arena	10,055	6–1–1–7	
16	14	(Croatia) Medveščak Zagreb	1–0	Slovan Bratislava	Dom Sportova	5,500	6–1–1–8	
17	18	Traktor Chelyabinsk	3–2	Slovan Bratislava	Traktor Sport Palace	5,700	6–1–1–9	
18	20	Yugra Khanty-Mansiysk	3 – 4 SO	Slovan Bratislava	Arena Ugra	2,250	6–2–1–9	
19	22	Neftekhimik Nizhnekamsk	1–3	Slovan Bratislava	SCC Arena	3,800	7–2–1–9	
20	24	Lada Togliatti	3–6	Slovan Bratislava	Lada Arena	5,432	8–2–1–9	
21	30	Slovan Bratislava	2–3	Sibir Novosibirsk	Slovnaft Arena	9,681	8–2–1–10	
22	31	Slovan Bratislava	1–3	Amur Khabarovsk	Slovnaft Arena	9,619	8–2–1–11	

November: 2–1–3–4 (Home: 1–1–1–2; Road: 1–0–2–2) Pts. 11

#	Date	Home team	Score	Away team	Arena	Attendance	Record	Recap
23	2	Slovan Bratislava	4–1	Admiral Vladivostok	Slovnaft Arena	8,902	9–2–1–11	
24	5	Sibir Novosibirsk	1 – 0 SO	Slovan Bratislava	Ice Sports Palace Sibir	5,500	9–2–2–11	
25	7	(Kazakhstan) Barys Astana	6–1	Slovan Bratislava	Kazakhstan Sports Palace	4,011	9–2–2–12	
26	12	Slovan Bratislava	1 – 2 SO	Medveščak Zagreb (Croatia)	Slovnaft Arena	8,728	9–2–3–12	
27	16	(Finland) Jokerit Helsinki	2–1	Slovan Bratislava	Hartwall Arena	9,319	9–2–3–13	
28	18	Atlant Mytishchi	1–2	Slovan Bratislava	Mytishchi Arena	5,800	10–2–3–13	
29	20	(Latvia) Dinamo Riga	1 – 0 SO	Slovan Bratislava	Arena Riga	3,480	10–2–4–13	
30	25	Slovan Bratislava	1–3	Lokomotiv Yaroslavl	Slovnaft Arena	9,135	10–2–4–14	
31	27	Slovan Bratislava	0–2	Vityaz Podolsk	Slovnaft Arena	7,719	10–2–4–15	
32	29	Slovan Bratislava	2 – 1 SO	Atlant Mytishchi	Slovnaft Arena	10,055	10–3–4–15	

December: 3–1–1–5 (Home: 3–1–1–3; Road: 0–0–0–2) Pts. 12

#	Date	Home team	Score	Away team	Arena	Attendance	Record	Recap
33	1	Slovan Bratislava	5–0	Metallurg Novokuznetsk	Slovnaft Arena	7,441	11–3–4–15	
34	3	HC Sochi	4–1	Slovan Bratislava	Bolshoy Ice Dome	6,537	11–3–4–16	
35	5	Dynamo Moscow	7–2	Slovan Bratislava	Minor Arena	4,672	11–3–4–17	
36	8	Slovan Bratislava	3–5	Avangard Omsk	Slovnaft Arena	7,504	11–3–4–18	
37	10	Slovan Bratislava	3–2	Barys Astana (Kazakhstan)	Slovnaft Arena	7,240	12–3–4–18	
38	12	Slovan Bratislava	3 – 2 SO	Salavat Yulaev Ufa	Slovnaft Arena	8,739	12–4–4–18	
39	15	Slovan Bratislava	6–2	Jokerit Helsinki (Finland)	Slovnaft Arena	9,058	13–4–4–18	
40	22	Slovan Bratislava	2 – 3 SO	Lada Togliatti	Slovnaft Arena	10,055	13–4–5–18	
41	24	Slovan Bratislava	4–6	Neftekhimik Nizhnekamsk	Slovnaft Arena	10,055	13–4–5–19	
42	26	Slovan Bratislava	1–6	SKA Saint Petersburg	Slovnaft Arena	10,055	13–4–5–20	

January: 1–1–2–6 (Home: 0–0–0–4; Road: 1–1–2–2) Pts. 7

#	Date	Home team	Score	Away team	Arena	Attendance	Record	Recap
43	4	(Croatia) Medveščak Zagreb	5–4	Slovan Bratislava	Dom Sportova	5,754	13–4–5–21	
44	8	(Belarus) Dinamo Minsk	3 – 2 SO	Slovan Bratislava	Minsk-Arena	15,086	13–4–6–21	
45	10	Lokomotiv Yaroslavl	0–2	Slovan Bratislava	Arena 2000	9,015	14–4–6–21	
46	12	Vityaz Podolsk	2 – 1 OT	Slovan Bratislava	Podolsk Hero Arena	1,500	14–4–7–21	
47	15	Slovan Bratislava	3–5	HC Sochi	Slovnaft Arena	8,784	14–4–7–22	
48	17	Slovan Bratislava	0–2	Dynamo Moscow	Slovnaft Arena	10,055	14–4–7–23	
49	20	Slovan Bratislava	4–6	Dinamo Minsk (Belarus)	Slovnaft Arena	7,856	14–4–7–24	
50	22	Slovan Bratislava	4–5	Atlant Mytishchi	Slovnaft Arena	7,574	14–4–7–25	
51	28	SKA Saint Petersburg	1 – 2 SO	Slovan Bratislava	Ice Palace	12,192	14–5–7–25	
52	30	(Finland) Jokerit Helsinki	4–0	Slovan Bratislava	Hartwall Arena	12,472	14–5–7–26	

February: 1–0–1–6 (Home: 1–0–1–1; Road: 0–0–0–5) Pts. 4

#	Date	Home team	Score	Away team	Arena	Attendance	Record	Recap
53	1	(Latvia) Dinamo Riga	6–0	Slovan Bratislava	Arena Riga	6,270	14–5–7–27	
54	3	Atlant Mytishchi	3–4	Slovan Bratislava	Mytishchi Arena	4,700	14–5–7–28	
55	11	CSKA Moscow	12–0	Slovan Bratislava	CSKA Ice Palace	3,547	14–5–7–29	
56	13	Torpedo Nizhny Novgorod	3–1	Slovan Bratislava	Trade Union Sport Palace	5,550	14–5–7–30	
57	15	Severstal Cherepovets	4–2	Slovan Bratislava	Ice Palace	4,182	14–5–7–31	
58	18	Slovan Bratislava	3–4	Dinamo Riga (Latvia)	Slovnaft Arena	7,307	14–5–7–32	
59	22	Slovan Bratislava	5–2	SKA Saint Petersburg	Slovnaft Arena	9,954	15–5–7–32	
60	24	Slovan Bratislava	2 – 3 OT	Jokerit Helsinki (Finland)	Slovnaft Arena	10,055	15–5–8–32	

Win (3 points) Overtime/shootout win (2 points) Overtime/shootout loss (1 point) Loss (0 points)

== Standings ==
Source: khl.ru
After games of October 26, 2014

=== Bobrov Division ===
R		GP	W	OTW	SOW	SOL	OTL	L	GF	GA	Pts
1	(Russia) SKA Saint Petersburg	21	19	1	0	0	0	1	98	44	59
2	(Finland) Jokerit Helsinki	21	13	2	0	0	1	5	69	52	44
3	(Belarus) Dinamo Minsk	19	9	2	0	3	1	4	55	46	35
4	(Slovakia) Slovan Bratislava	20	8	0	2	1	0	9	53	54	29
5	(Croatia) Medveščak Zagreb	22	7	1	0	1	0	13	49	69	24
6	(Latvia) Dinamo Riga	21	6	0	1	2	1	11	44	60	23
7	(Russia) Atlant Mytishchi	19	5	0	3	1	1	9	49	55	23

=== Western Conference ===
R		Div	GP	W	OTW	SOW	SOL	OTL	L	GF	GA	Pts
1	(Russia) SKA Saint Petersburg *	BOB	21	19	1	0	0	0	1	98	44	59
2	(Russia) CSKA Moscow *	TAR	21	17	0	0	1	0	3	70	31	52
3	(Finland) Jokerit Helsinki	BOB	21	13	2	0	0	1	5	69	52	44
4	(Russia) Dynamo Moscow	TAR	20	13	1	0	2	0	4	55	43	43
5	(Russia) Torpedo Nizhny Novgorod	TAR	22	10	0	3	2	2	5	62	50	40
6	(Belarus) Dinamo Minsk	BOB	19	9	2	0	3	1	4	55	46	35
7	(Slovakia) Slovan Bratislava	BOB	20	8	0	2	1	0	9	53	54	29
8	(Russia) Vityaz Podolsk	TAR	19	8	0	2	0	1	8	55	62	29
9	(Russia) Severstal Cherepovets	TAR	22	6	0	4	2	0	10	61	63	28
10	(Russia) Lokomotiv Yaroslavl	TAR	19	7	0	1	4	0	7	51	52	27
11	(Croatia) Medveščak Zagreb	BOB	22	7	1	0	1	0	13	49	69	24
12	(Latvia) Dinamo Riga	BOB	21	6	0	1	2	1	11	44	60	23
13	(Russia) Atlant Mytishchi	BOB	19	5	0	3	1	1	9	49	55	23
14	(Russia) HC Sochi	TAR	18	4	1	0	1	1	11	27	51	16

*– Division leader;
BOB – Bobrov Division, TAR – Tarasov Division

== Player statistics ==
=== Skaters ===
Regular season
Player	GP	G	A	Pts	+/-	PIM
Ladislav Nagy	51	23	18	41	−6	60
Rok Tičar	59	11	19	30	+1	30
Matt Murley	46	11	13	24	−19	75
Tomáš Netík	56	11	13	24	−5	28
Žiga Jeglič	57	8	15	23	+4	39
Michal Sersen	59	5	17	22	−21	79
Milan Bartovič	54	10	11	21	−9	22
Libor Hudáček	45	10	10	20	−15	20
Michal Vondrka	45	7	12	19	−2	28
Václav Nedorost	37	10	8	18	−6	42
Tomáš Surový	56	7	6	13	−20	55
Ivan Baranka	45	4	8	12	−3	46
Cam Barker	18	0	9	9	−13	19
Tomáš Starosta	42	2	5	7	−4	22
Andrej Šťastný	43	4	3	7	−11	37
Martin Štajnoch	49	1	4	5	−19	71
Štefan Ružička	11	2	2	4	−3	12
Andrej Kudrna	21	1	2	3	−8	0
Vladimír Mihálik	33	2	1	3	−8	28
Mário Bližňák	28	0	2	2	−13	6
Peter Ölvecký	31	0	2	2	−6	6
Ján Brejčák	40	0	2	2	−7	47
Dominik Rehák	10	1	0	1	−2	4
Lukáš Kozák	17	0	1	1	−5	6
Kurtis Foster	18	0	1	1	−8	18
Patrik Luža	22	0	1	1	−3	2
Mário Lunter	31	1	0	1	−5	12
Jonathan Sigalet	38	0	1	1	−4	38
Tomáš Rachůnek	9	0	0	0	−3	2
Patrick White	26	0	0	0	−15	6

=== Goaltenders ===
Regular season
Player	GP	W	L	SOP	SOG	GA	SV	SV%	GAA	G	A	SO	PIM	TOI
Johan Backlund	36	9	17	6	908	91	817	90.0	2.64	0	0	2	0	2066:44
Jaroslav Janus	25	6	12	5	612	67	545	89.1	3.01	0	0	2	2	1337:37
Samuel Baroš	1	0	1	0	34	3	21	87.5	3.46	0	0	0	0	51:57
Denis Godla	4	0	3	0	93	15	78	83.9	5.17	0	0	0	0	173:57
David LeNeveu	1	0	1	0	7	2	5	71.4	13.87	0	0	0	0	8:39

== Team statistics ==
All statistics are for regular season only.

Statistic	Value
Matches played	60
Total points	63
Record	15–5–8–32
Score	136 – 188
Biggest win	5 – 0 (Round 33 vs. Metallurg Novokuznetsk)
Biggest defeat	0 – 12 (Round 55 vs. CSKA Moscow)
Shots on goal %	7.50% (136/1,814)
Shutouts	2
Penalty in minutes	876
Powerplay %	15.4% (37/241)
Penalty killing	84.9% (225/265)
Average attendance	8,975
Number of sold-out home games	10
Most consecutive wins (Note: Regular time wins.)	3 (Round 1 – Round 3)
Most consecutive wins + overtime wins	3 (Round 1 – Round 3 & Round 44 – Round 46)
Most consecutive undefeated matches (Note: Games without a regular time loss.)	4 (Round 37 – Round 40 )
Most consecutive losses (Note: Regular time losses)	7 (Round 52 – Round 58)
Most consecutive losses + overtime losses	7 (Round 52 – Round 58)
Most consecutive matches without a win (Note: Games without a regular time win.)	12 (Round 47 – Round 58)
Longest time between scored goals	149:00 (Round 52 – Round 54)
Longest time without a conceded goal	113:30 (Round 45 – Round 46)

Notes

== Roster ==
Source: hcslovan.sk
Source: eliteprospects.com
Source: khl.ru
As of February 1, 2015

No.	Nat	Player	Pos	S/G	Age	Acquired	Birthplace
30	(Slovakia)	Denis Godla	G	L	31	2015	Kežmarok, Slovakia
3	(Slovakia)	Martin Štajnoch	D	R	35	2008	Bojnice, Czechoslovakia
72	(Slovakia)	Lukáš Kozák	D	L	34	2014	Martin, Slovakia
51	(Canada)	Cam Barker	D	L	40	2014	Winnipeg, Manitoba, Canada
90	(Slovakia)	Libor Hudáček	RW	R	35	2014	Levoča, Czechoslovakia
26	(Sweden)	Johan Backlund	G	L	45	2014	Skellefteå, Sweden
7	(Slovakia)	Ivan Baranka	D	L	41	2014	Ilava, Czechoslovakia
31	(Slovakia)	Samuel Baroš	G	L	32	2014	Bratislava, Slovakia
61	(Slovakia)	Milan Bartovič	LW	L	45	2012	Trenčín, Czechoslovakia
91	(Slovakia)	Ján Brejčák	D	L	37	2013	Poprad, Czechoslovakia
13	(Slovenia)	Žiga Jeglič	RW	R	38	2014	Kranj, Slovenia
33	(Slovakia)	Mário Lunter	RW	L	32	2014	Banská Bystrica, Slovakia
4	(Slovakia)	Patrik Luža	D	R	32	2011	Bratislava, Slovakia
56	(Slovakia)	Vladimír Mihálik	D	L	39	2012	Prešov, Czechoslovakia
19	(United States)	Matt Murley	C	L	46	2014	Troy, NY, USA
27	(Slovakia)	Ladislav Nagy	RW	L	47	2014	Košice, Slovakia
14	(Czech Republic)	Václav Nedorost	C	L	44	2014	České Budějovice, Czechoslovakia
71	(Czech Republic)	Tomáš Netík	RW	L	44	2014	Prague, Czechoslovakia
85	(Slovakia)	Peter Ölvecký	C	L	40	2012	Nové Zámky, Czechoslovakia
8	(Slovakia)	Michal Sersen	D	L	40	2012	Gelnica, Czechoslovakia
97	(Slovakia)	Tomáš Starosta	D	L	45	2014	Trenčín, Czechoslovakia
43	(Slovakia)	Tomáš Surový	C	L	44	2014	Banská Bystrica, Czechoslovakia
59	(Slovakia)	Andrej Šťastný	C	L	35	2012	Považská Bystrica, Czechoslovakia
24	(Slovenia)	Rok Tičar	RW	L	37	2014	Jesenice, Slovenia
67	(United States)	Patrick White	C	R	37	2014	Grand Rapids, MN, USA
12	(Slovakia)	Dominik Rehák	RW	L	31	2015	Žilina, Slovakia

== Roster changes ==
=== Players Joining ===
Date	Player	Former team	Contract terms
2 May 2014	(Slovenia) Žiga Jeglič	(Germany) ERC Ingolstadt	1 year
2 May 2014	(Slovenia) Rok Tičar	(Germany) Kölner Haie	1 year
21 May 2014	(Slovakia) Ladislav Nagy	(Finland) Jokerit Helsinki	2 years
21 May 2014	(Sweden) Johan Backlund	(Russia) Vityaz Podolsk	1 year
29 May 2014	(United States) Patrick White	(Slovakia) HC '05 Banská Bystrica	Try-out
2 June 2014	(United States) Matt Murley	(Croatia) Medveščak Zagreb	2 years
12 June 2014	(Slovakia) Tomáš Surový	(Belarus) Dinamo Minsk	1 year
16 June 2014	(Czech Republic) Tomáš Netík	(Russia) Neftekhimik Nizhnekamsk	1 year
26 June 2014	(Slovakia) Mário Lunter	(Slovakia) HC '05 Banská Bystrica	1 year, two-way
27 June 2014	(Canada) Kurtis Foster	(Croatia) Medveščak Zagreb	1 year
17 July 2014	(Slovakia) Ivan Baranka	(Russia) Avangard Omsk	1 year
4 August 2014	(Czech Republic) Václav Nedorost	(Ukraine) Donbass Donetsk	1 year
1 September 2014	(Slovakia) Tomáš Starosta	(Russia) Yugra Khanty-Mansiysk	1 year
27 October 2014	(Czech Republic) Tomáš Rachůnek	(Russia) Metallurg Novokuznetsk	Try-out
11 November 2014	(Slovakia) Štefan Ružička	(Switzerland) Lausanne HC	1 year
11 December 2014	(Canada) David LeNeveu	(United States) South Carolina Stingrays (ECHL)	1 year
22 December 2014	(Canada) Cam Barker	(Canada) Vancouver Canucks (NHL)	1 year

=== Players Leaving ===
Date	Player	New team	Contract terms
30 April 2014	(Slovakia) Juraj Mikúš	N/A	N/A
5 May 2014	(Slovakia) Michel Miklík	(Russia) Amur Khabarovsk	2 years
27 May 2014	(Czech Republic) Martin Škoula	(Czech Republic) Bílí Tygři Liberec	2 years
6 June 2014	(Czech Republic) Miroslav Kopřiva	(Czech Republic) Piráti Chomutov	1 year
27 June 2014	(Slovakia) Tomáš Mikúš	(Finland) Kajaanin Hokki	1 year
31 July 2014	(Slovakia) Roman Kukumberg	(Czech Republic) Mountfield HK	2 years
26 August 2014	(Slovakia) Richard Mráz	(Slovakia) HK Nitra	1 year
28 August 2014	(Slovakia) Bruno Mráz	(Slovakia) HK 36 Skalica	1 year
15 September 2014	(Slovakia) Martin Bakoš	(Czech Republic) Bílí Tygři Liberec	1 year
15 September 2014	(Slovakia) Branko Radivojevič	(Slovakia) HK Dukla Trenčín	Undisclosed
26 September 2014	(Czech Republic) Tomáš Mojžíš	(Czech Republic) HC Pardubice	Short-term contract
14 November 2014	(Slovakia) Libor Hudáček	(Slovakia) HC '05 Banská Bystrica	Short-term loan
17 November 2014	(Canada) Kurtis Foster	(Germany) Adler Mannheim	End of season
15 December 2014	(Slovakia) Mário Bližňák	(Czech Republic) HC Plzeň	1 year
14 November 2014	(Canada) Jonathan Sigalet	(Sweden) Lulea Hockey	2 years
27 January 2015	(Czech Republic) Michal Vondrka	(Czech Republic) HC Sparta Prague	
27 January 2015	(Slovakia) Štefan Ružička	(Czech Republic) HC Oceláři Třinec	
30 January 2015	(Slovakia) Jaroslav Janus	(Czech Republic) HC Sparta Prague	
15 February 2015	(Slovakia) Tomáš Surový	(Slovakia) HC '05 Banská Bystrica	End of season

=== Player signings ===
This is the list of all players that extended their contracts with HC Slovan Bratislava:

Date	Player	Contract prolonged until
3 June 2014	(Slovakia) Jaroslav Janus	30 April 2015
2 July 2014	(Czech Republic) Michal Vondrka	30 April 2015
5 August 2014	(Slovakia) Samuel Baroš	30 April 2015

=== Players lost via retirement ===
Date	Player
20 May 2013	(Slovakia) Miroslav Šatan

== Draft picks ==
Slovan's picks at the 2014 KHL Junior Draft in Saint Petersburg.

Round	Pick	Player	Position	Nationality	Team (League)
1	14	Erik Černák	D	Slovakia	HC Košice (Slovak Extraliga)
2	59	Radovan Bondra	F	Slovakia	HC Košice jr. (Slovak Extraliga jr.)
3	105	Peter Valent	F	Slovakia	HC '05 Banská Bystrica (Slovak Extraliga)
4	145	Martin Andrisík	F	Slovakia	HC '05 Banská Bystrica jr. (Slovak Extraliga jr.)
5	180	Denis Pätoprstý	F	Slovakia	BK Mladá Boleslav (Czech Extraliga)

== See also ==
- HC Slovan Bratislava all-time KHL record
- List of HC Slovan Bratislava seasons
