= 2024 Deutschland Cup =

Tournament details
- Host country: Germany
- Venue: 1 (in 1 host city)
- Dates: 6–10 November
- Teams: 8

The 2024 Deutschland Cup was the 35th edition of the tournament, held between 6 and 10 November 2024.

== Men's tournament ==
2024 Deutschland Cup
Tournament details
- Venue: 1 (in 1 host city)
- Dates: 9–12 November
- Teams: 4

Final positions
- Champions: Slovakia (5th title)
- Runners-up: Germany
- Third place: Austria
- Fourth place: Denmark

Tournament statistics
- Games played: 6
- Goals scored: 36 (6 per game)
- Attendance: 12,280 (2,047 per game)
- Scoring leader: (Denmark) Nick Olesen (5 points)

=== Standings ===
Pos	Team	Pld	W	OTW	OTL	L	GF	GA	GD	Pts
1	Slovakia	3	2	1	0	0	10	4	+6	8
2	Germany (H)	3	1	0	1	1	13	12	+1	4
3	Austria	3	1	0	0	2	3	9	−6	3 (Note: Austria 3–2 Denmark)
4	Denmark	3	0	1	1	1	10	11	−1	3

Source: IIHF
Rules for classification: 1) points; 2) head-to-head points; 3) head-to-head goal difference; 4) head-to-head number of goals scored.
(H) Host

=== Results ===
All times are local (UTC+1).

7 November 2024; 12:30	Austria	0–1 (0–1, 0–0, 0–0)	Slovakia	Fanatec Arena, Landshut; Attendance: 370

Game reference
David Kickert	Goalies	Rastislav Eliáš	Referees: (Finland) Mikko Kaukokari (Germany) Lukas Kohlmüller; Linesmen: (Germany) Kenneth Englisch (Czech Republic) Jiří Ondráček
0–1 / 13:07 – Cehlárik (Cingel, Mudrák)			Referees: (Finland) Mikko Kaukokari (Germany) Lukas Kohlmüller; Linesmen: (Germany) Kenneth Englisch (Czech Republic) Jiří Ondráček
2 min	Penalties	8 min	Referees: (Finland) Mikko Kaukokari (Germany) Lukas Kohlmüller; Linesmen: (Germany) Kenneth Englisch (Czech Republic) Jiří Ondráček
29	Shots	28	Referees: (Finland) Mikko Kaukokari (Germany) Lukas Kohlmüller; Linesmen: (Germany) Kenneth Englisch (Czech Republic) Jiří Ondráček

7 November 2024; 19:45	Germany	5–6 GWS (4–3, 1–1, 0–1) (OT: 0–0) (SO: 0–1)	Denmark	Fanatec Arena, Landshut; Attendance: 2,238

Game reference

Maximilian Franzreb
Goalies
Mathias Seldrup
Referees:
(Sweden) Tobias Björk
(Germany) Nikolas Neutzer
Linesmen:
(Czech Republic) Daniel Hynek
(Sweden) Ludvig Lundgren

	0–1	02:37 – Andersen
	0–2	08:01 – Schmidt-Svejstrup (Andersen, Carstensen)
Schütz (Pfaffengut) – 08:17	1–2
	1–3	08:28 – Madsen (Aagaard)
Schmölz (Pfaffengut, Ugbekile) (PP) – 11:36	2–3
Schmölz (Schinko, Ehliz) – 17:40	3–3
Hager (Ehliz, Kastner) – 18:34	4–3
	4–4	23:17 – Olesen
Loibl (Kühnhackl) (SH) – 32:30	5–4
	5–5	45:22 – Olesen (From, Aagaard) (PP)

Ehliz (miss)
Stachowiak
Schütz
Schmölz (miss)
Schinko (miss)
Schütz (miss)
Shootout
Olesen
(miss) Madsen
(miss) Aagaard
From
(miss) True
Olesen
29 min
Penalties
10 min
30
Shots
28

9 November 2024; 11:00	Austria	3–2 (1–0, 1–1, 1–1)	Denmark	Fanatec Arena, Landshut; Attendance: 989

Game reference

Sebastian Wraneschitz
Goalies
William Rorth
Referees:
(Germany) Nikolas Neutzer
(Germany) André Schrader
Linesmen:
(Germany) Kenneth Englisch
(Sweden) Ludvig Lundgren

Wukovits (Thaler, Neubauer) – 16:46	1–0
	1–1	31:11 – Olesen (Setkov, True) (PP)
Thaler (Haudum, Wolf) – 34:48	2–1
	2–2	47:35 – Olesen (From, Larsen)
Schnetzer (Rohrer) – 56:42	3–2

39 min
Penalties
31 min
36
Shots
17

9 November 2024; 18:00	Germany	2–6 (0–1, 1–1, 1–4)	Slovakia	Fanatec Arena, Landshut; Attendance: 4,200

Game reference

Dustin Strahlmeier
Goalies
Matej Tomek
Referees:
(Sweden) Tobias Björk
(Finland) Mikko Kaukokari
Linesmen:
(Czech Republic) Daniel Hynek
(Czech Republic) Jiří Ondráček

	0–1	16:49 – Takáč (Faško-Rudáš)
	0–2	24:08 – Korenčík (Cingel)
Schinko (Schmölz, Stachowiak) – 27:49	1–2
	1–3	43:58 – Faško-Rudáš (Takáč, Petrovický)
	1–4	54:14 – Roman (Golian, Stacha) (EA)
	1–5	55:15 – Ivan (Cehlárik, Pospíšil) (PP)
Schmölz (Schütz, Stachowiak) (PP) – 56:28	2–5
	2–6	59:43 – Takáč (EN)

2 min
Penalties
4 min
31
Shots
25

10 November 2024; 11:30	Denmark	2–3 GWS (0–0, 1–2, 1–0) (OT: 0–0) (SO: 0–1)	Slovakia	Fanatec Arena, Landshut; Attendance: 1,200

Game reference

Mathias Seldrup
Goalies
Rastislav Eliáš
Referees:
(Sweden) Tobias Björk
(Germany) André Schrader
Linesmen:
(Czech Republic) Daniel Hynek
(Germany) Markus Merk

	0–1	20:39 – Buček (Hrehorčák)
Madsen (Kjær, Schultz) (PP) – 24:59	1–1
	1–2	27:55 – Lukošik
Olesen (Setkov, From) (PP) – 50:13	2–2

Olesen (miss)
From (miss)
Setkov
Rübenach (miss)
Kjær (miss)
Shootout
Buček
(miss) Cehlárik
(miss) Petráš
Pospíšil
(miss) Tamáši
4 min
Penalties
10 min
31
Shots
32

10 November 2024; 15:00	Germany	6–0 (1–0, 2–0, 3–0)	Austria	Fanatec Arena, Landshut; Attendance: 3,283

Game reference

Arno Tiefensee
Goalies
David Kickers
Referees:
(Finland) Mikko Kaukokari
(Germany) Lukas Kohlmüller
Linesmen:
(Sweden) Ludvig Lundgren
(Czech Republic) Jiří Ondráček

Schinko (Kälble) – 09:42	1–0
Daubner (Kühnhackl, Loibl) – 23:08	2–0
Kühnhackl (Wagner, Stachowiak) – 33:26	3–0
Pfaffengut (Wagner, Gawanke) – 46:21	4–0
Schinko (Schmölz) – 56:02	5–0
Eder (Hager, Kastner) – 59:13	6–0

25 min
Penalties
2 min
25
Shots
29

== Women's tournament ==
2024 Deutschland Cup
Tournament details
- Venue: 1 (in 1 host city)
- Dates: 6–9 November
- Teams: 4

Final positions
- Champions: Germany (1st title)
- Runners-up: Hungary
- Third place: France
- Fourth place: Slovakia

Tournament statistics
- Games played: 6
- Goals scored: 34 (5.67 per game)
- Attendance: 7,716 (1,286 per game)
- Scoring leader: (France) Clara Rozier (8 points)

=== Standings ===
Pos	Team	Pld	W	OTW	OTL	L	GF	GA	GD	Pts
1	Germany (H)	3	3	0	0	0	9	3	+6	9
2	Hungary	3	1	1	0	1	9	9	0	5
3	France	3	1	0	1	1	9	11	−2	4
4	Slovakia	3	0	0	0	3	7	11	−4	0

Source: IIHF
Rules for classification: 1) points; 2) head-to-head points; 3) head-to-head goal difference; 4) head-to-head number of goals scored.
(H) Host

=== Results ===
6 November 2024; 16:15	Slovakia	3–4 (1–0, 0–2, 2–2)	Hungary	Fanatec Arena, Landshut; Attendance: 261

Game reference

Nikola Zimková
Goalies
Anikó Németh
Referees:
(Germany) Caroline Butt
(Germany) Florian Meineke
Linesmen:
(Germany) Lara Fischer
(Germany) Julia Wagner

Tóthová (Halušková, Hlinka) – 19:03	1–0
	1–1	25:42 – Huszák (Mayer, Hiezl) (PP)
	1–2	27:16 – Baker (Rónai, Gondos)
Hlinka (Tóthová, Košecká) (PP) – 41:16	2–2
	2–3	44:58 – Williams (Baker, Odnoga) (PP)
	2–4	53:08 – Williams (Dabasi) (SH)
Košecká (Hlinka, Tóthová) (PP) – 54:05	3–4

14 min
Penalties
8 min
29
Shots
22

6 November 2024; 19:45	Germany	4–1 (2–1, 1–0, 1–0)	France	Fanatec Arena, Landshut; Attendance: 1,260

Game reference

Sandra Abstreiter
Goalies
Justine Crousy-Théode
Referees:
(Germany) Vanessa Anselm
(Germany) Karin Williner
Linesmen:
(France) Alexia Cheyroux
(Germany) Leonie Ernst

Gleißner (Nix, Hark) (PP) – 10:13	1–0
Schiefer (Häckelsmiller, Strobel) (PP) – 11:24	2–0
	2–1	16:36 – Cedelle (Duvin, Rozier)
Häckelsmiller (Feldmeier, Schiefer) – 31:03	3–1
Nix (Kluge, Eisenschmid) – 45:38	4–1

16 min
Penalties
6 min
40
Shots
19

7 November 2024; 16:15	France	5–3 (1–2, 2–0, 2–1)	Slovakia	Fanatec Arena, Landshut; Attendance: 660

Game reference

Violette Pianel
Goalies
Andrea Rišianová
Referees:
(Germany) Caroline Butt
(Austria) Julia Kainberger
Linesmen:
(Germany) Leonie Ernst
(Germany) Julia Wagner

Gentien (Poirrier, Rozier) – 01:52	1–0
	1–1	05:48 – Halušková (Košecká) (PP)
	1–2	11:50 – Blichová (Gálisová, Plankenauerová)
Rozier (Duvin, Leclerc) – 31:07	2–2
Rozier (Duvin) (PP2) – 37:51	3–2
	3–3	45:35 – Hlinka (Krákorová, Plankenauerová)
Baudrit (Rozier, Duvin) (PP) – 51:27	4–3
Rozier (EN) – 59:11	5–3

8 min
Penalties
56 min
27
Shots
17

8 November 2024; 15:00	Hungary	4–3 OT (0–1, 1–1, 2–1) (OT: 1–0)	France	Fanatec Arena, Landshut; Attendance: 327

Game reference

Noémi Takács
Goalies
Margaux Mameri
Referees:
(Germany) Vanessa Anselm
(Germany) Caroline Butt
Linesmen:
(Germany) Leonie Ernst
(Germany) Lara Fischer

	0–1	10:14 – Huot (Quarto, Zillox) (PP2)
Horváth (Németh, Gondos) – 22:04	1–1
	1–2	37:18 – Rozier (Duvin) (PP)
	1–3	45:45 – Rozier (Duvin, Berger)
Imets (Márton, Lippai) – 49:11	2–3
Odnoga (Dabasi, Baker) (PP2) – 53:55	3–3
Dabasi (Hiezl, Baker) (EA) – 63:57	4–3

12 min
Penalties
8 min
36
Shots
23

8 November 2024; 19:00	Germany	2–1 (1–1, 0–0, 1–0)	Slovakia	Fanatec Arena, Landshut; Attendance: 2,138

Game reference

Lisa Hemmerle
Goalies
Andrea Rišianová
Referees:
(Austria) Julia Kainberger
(Germany) Karin Williner
Linesmen:
(France) Alexia Cheyroux
(Germany) Julia Wagner

	0–1	05:47 – Tóthová
Eisenschmid (Kluge, Schiefer) – 18:49	1–1
Gleißner (Häckelsmiller, Feldmeier) – 41:11	2–1

8 min
Penalties
6 min
36
Shots
31

9 November 2024; 14:30	Germany	3–1 (1–0, 1–0, 1–1)	Hungary	Fanatec Arena, Landshut; Attendance: 3,070

Game reference

Sandra Abstreiter
Goalies
Anikó Németh
Referees:
(Germany) Vanessa Anselm
(Austria) Julia Kainberger
Linesmen:
(France) Alexia Cheyroux
(Germany) Lara Fischer

Nix (Kluge, Eisenschmid) (PP) – 14:45	1–0
Schiefer (Hark, Gleißner) – 34:28	2–0
	2–1	Jókai Szilágyi (Mozolai, Hiezl) – 52:46
Eisenschmid (Nix, Feldmeier) (PP, EN) – 59:27	3–1

12 min
Penalties
12 min
32
Shots
18
