= Vůjtek =

Vůjtek is a Czech surname, its female form is Vůjtková. Notable people with the surname include:

- Vladimír Vůjtek (born 1972), Czech ice hockey player
- Vladimír Vůjtek (ice hockey, born 1947), Czech ice hockey player and coach
