= Deutschland Cup =

German international ice hockey tournament

- Deutschland Cup logo
- Status: Active
- Genre: Sporting event
- Date: November
- Frequency: Annual
- Venue: Fanatec Arena
- Location: Landshut
- Country: Germany
- Inaugurated: 1987
- 2026 Deutschland Cup

The Deutschland Cup is an in-season international ice hockey tournament hosted by the German Ice Hockey Federation which has been contested in most years since 1987.

== Early years (1987–1997) ==
In 1987, the German Ice Hockey Federation created the Deutschland Cup as an official international tournament. Stuttgart served as a site for the first years of the tournament, with at least one game taking place in the Baden-Württemberg capital every year through 1996, except 1991, when the tournament was played at the Eissporthalle Frankfurt. Ulm, Bietigheim and Pforzheim in 1993 and Pforzheim and Neu-Ulm in 1994 also served as tournament sites.

Over the years, the tournament format has changed frequently. At first, the tournament featured three teams, and then as of the second year, four teams, in a round-robin format to determine a winner. At its peak in the mid-1990s, the tournament consisted of an opening round with two groups and a final round where overall placings were determined. In 1997, was played in München and Füssen.

Along with host Germany, the most important prominent teams took part in the early years, such as Czechoslovakia, and later the Czech Republic and Slovakia, various representatives from the Soviet Union and Russia, as well as Sweden, Finland and Canada. The 1991 edition was the last tournament for the Soviet Union national team—which came out the winner—before its final dissolution. In conjunction with the establishment of the new top division Deutsche Eishockey Liga, a DEL All-Star Team also took part in 1994.

== Re-establishment (since 2000) ==
In anticipation of the 2001 IIHF World Championships in Germany, the tournament returned from its two-year hiatus in order to serve as a test run for the upcoming major event. The TUI Arena in Hanover, built for Expo 2000, established itself as a site for the tournament over the following years, and the new multipurpose arenas such as the Color Line Arena in Hamburg in 2004 and the SAP Arena in Mannheim in 2005 also were given the opportunity to host international tournaments for the first time. To emphasize the close cooperation with ongoing participant Switzerland, the opening games of the 2004 tournament as well as the renamed TUI Nations Cup in 2005 took place on Swiss ice, namely at the Bodensee-Arena in Kreuzlingen and at the Zurich Hallenstadion, respectively. In 2006, the tournament returned to its old name of Deutschland Cup. In 2008, the tournament started taking place in Mannheim and Frankfurt. From 2009 to 2014, the tournament took place at Olympiahalle in Munich.

The usual entries in the tournament at the start of the 21st century, in addition to the hosts Germany and Switzerland, were notably Slovakia, Canada, as well as the US National Team, the latter two, however, mainly made up of players stationed in European leagues and not in the North American National Hockey League.

In 2015, it was announced that the tournament would move from Munich to Augsburg at the Curt Frenzel Stadium.

From 2018 on, the tournament was held in Krefeld.

In 2023, the tournament moved to Landshut and it was the first time that a women's tournament was held at the same time.

== Results ==
=== Men's tournament ===
Year	Champion	Runner-up	Third place
1987	Czechoslovakia	West Germany	Poland
1988	Soviet Union	West Germany	Switzerland
1989	not played		
1990	Finland	Sweden	Czechoslovakia
1991	Soviet Union	Sweden	Germany
1992	Russia	Germany	Switzerland
1993	Russia	Canada	Finland
1994	Czech Republic	Slovakia	Canada
1995	Germany	Czech Republic	Finland
1996	Germany	Italy	Canada
1997	Slovakia	Canada	Switzerland
1998	not played		
1999	not played		
2000	Canada	Switzerland	Slovakia
2001	Switzerland	Slovakia	Germany
2002	Canada	United States	Germany
2003	United States	Germany	Switzerland
2004	United States	Canada	Slovakia
2005	Canada	Switzerland	Slovakia
2006	Slovakia	Switzerland	Canada
2007	Switzerland	United States	Germany
2008	Canada	Switzerland	Germany
2009	Germany	United States	Switzerland
2010	Germany	Switzerland	Canada
2011	Slovakia	Germany	Switzerland
2012	Germany	Switzerland	Slovakia
2013	United States	Switzerland	Germany
2014	Germany	Switzerland	Slovakia
2015	Germany	United States	Switzerland
2016	Slovakia	Canada	Germany
2017	Russia	Slovakia	Germany
2018	Russia	Switzerland	Slovakia
2019	Switzerland	Germany	Russia
2020	Latvia	Germany	Top Team Peking
2021	Germany	Slovakia	Switzerland
2022	Germany	Austria	Denmark
2023	Germany	Slovakia	Denmark
2024	Slovakia	Germany	Austria
2025	Germany	Slovakia	Latvia
2026	Latvia	Germany	Slovakia

=== Women's tournament ===
Year	Champion	Runner-up	Third place
2023	Czech Republic	Finland	Germany
2024	Germany	Hungary	France
2025	Germany	Slovakia	Hungary
2026	not played		

== See also ==
- Euro Hockey Tour
- Nissan Cup
