= 2020 Deutschland Cup =

Tournament details
- Host country: Germany
- Venue: 1 (in 1 host city)
- Dates: 5–8 November
- Teams: 3

Final positions
- Champions: Latvia (1st title)
- Runners-up: Germany
- Third place: Top Team Peking

Tournament statistics
- Games played: 4
- Goals scored: 22 (5.5 per game)
- Attendance: 0 (0 per game)
- Scoring leader: (Germany) Marc Michaelis (4 points)

The 2020 Deutschland Cup was the 31st edition of the tournament, held between 5 and 8 November 2020.

Latvia won the tournament, defeating Germany in the final.

Due to the COVID-19 pandemic, only three teams participated this year. The "Top Team Peking" was composed of German players, in preparation for the 2022 Winter Olympics. Due to the pandemic, the tournament was held behind closed doors.

== Preliminary round ==
=== Standings ===
Pos	Team	Pld	W	OTW	OTL	L	GF	GA	GD	Pts	Qualification
1	Germany (H)	2	2	0	0	0	9	2	+7	6	Final
2	Latvia	2	1	0	0	1	4	4	0	3	Final
3	Top Team Peking	2	0	0	0	2	4	11	−7	0	

Source: IIHF
Rules for classification: 1) points; 2) head-to-head points; 3) head-to-head goal difference; 4) head-to-head number of goals scored.
(H) Host

All times are local (UTC+1).

=== Results ===
5 November 2020; 19:45	Germany	7–2 (4–1, 1–0, 2–1)	Top Team Peking	Yayla Arena, Krefeld; Attendance: 0

Game reference

Felix Brückmann
Mathias Niederberger
Goalies
Tobias Ancicka
Referees:
(Germany) Lasse Kopitz
(Germany) André Schrader
Linesmen:
(Germany) Kai Jürgens
(Germany) Patrick Laguzov

	0–1	02:51 – Kinder
Ehliz (Eisenschmid, Plachta) (PP) – 08:03	1–1
Michaelis (Eisenschmid) – 11:10	2–1
Brandt (Bergmann, Michaelis) – 14:14	3–1
Ugbekile (Brandt, Eisenschmid) – 17:57	4–1
Noebels (Fischbuch, Gawanke) (PP) – 32:34	5–1
Brandt (Tiffels, Nowak) – 48:07	6–1
Eisenschmid (Michaelis) – 49:55	7–1
	7–2	57:04 – Hanelt (Reichel, Erik Buschmann)

6 min
Penalties
8 min
46
Shots
15

6 November 2020; 17:00	Top Team Peking	2–4 (0–1, 2–2, 0–1)	Latvia	Yayla Arena, Krefeld; Attendance: 0

Game reference

Hendrik Hane
Goalies
Artūrs Šilovs
Referees:
(Finland) Aleksi Rantala
(Germany) Gordon Schukies
Linesmen:
(Germany) Andreas Kowert
(Germany) Jan philipp Priebsch

	0–1	08:58 – Jeļisejevs (Ezītis, Sprukts)
Reisnecker (Elias, Brunnhuber) – 25:17	1–1
Gnyp (Hane) – 35:03	2–1
	2–2	36:57 – Džeriņš (Karsums, Bindulis)
	2–3	38:47 – Čukste
	2–4	45:21 – Ri. Bukarts (Krastenbergs, Salija)

20 min
Penalties
6 min
36
Shots
18

7 November 2020; 16:45	Germany	2–0 (0–0, 0–0, 2–0)	Latvia	Yayla Arena, Krefeld; Attendance: 0

Game reference
Felix Brückmann	Goalies	Rūdolfs Lazdiņš; Artūrs Šilovs	Referees: (Germany) Benjamin Hoppe (Germany) Marc Iwert; Linesmen: (Germany) Wayne Gerth (Germany) Jonas Merten
Noebels (Ehliz, Ugbekile) – 54:24 / 1–0; Plachta (EN) – 58:27 / 2–0			Referees: (Germany) Benjamin Hoppe (Germany) Marc Iwert; Linesmen: (Germany) Wayne Gerth (Germany) Jonas Merten
8 min	Penalties	6 min	Referees: (Germany) Benjamin Hoppe (Germany) Marc Iwert; Linesmen: (Germany) Wayne Gerth (Germany) Jonas Merten
34	Shots	28	Referees: (Germany) Benjamin Hoppe (Germany) Marc Iwert; Linesmen: (Germany) Wayne Gerth (Germany) Jonas Merten

== Final ==
8 November 2020; 14:30	Germany	2–3 OT (1–2, 0–0, 1–0) (OT: 0–1)	Latvia	Yayla Arena, Krefeld; Attendance: 0

Game reference

Mathias Niederberger
Goalies
Artūrs Šilovs
Referees:
(Germany) Sirko Hunnius
(Germany) Lukas Kohlmüller
Linesmen:
(Germany) Maxim Cepik
(Germany) Christoffer Hurtik

Eder (Wolgemuth) – 09:57	1–0
	1–1	17:44 – Sprukts (Ezītis) (PP)
	1–2	17:55 – Razgals (Krastenbergs)
Michaelis (Gawanke, Plachta) (PP2) – 46:12	2–2
	2–3	64:01 – Razgals (Rēdlihs)

10 min
Penalties
10 min
41
Shots
37
