= František Hossa =

Slovak ice hockey player and coach

- Born: 13 September 1954 (age 70); Smižany, Czechoslovakia
- Position: Defenceman
- Shot: Left
- Played for: HK Dukla Trenčín
- Playing career: 1977–1987

František Hossa (born 13 September 1954) is a Slovak former ice hockey player. Both his sons, Marián and Marcel, are professional ice hockey players. As of 2002, he is also the assistant coach of the Slovakia men's national ice hockey team.
