= Mário Lunter =

Slovak ice hockey player

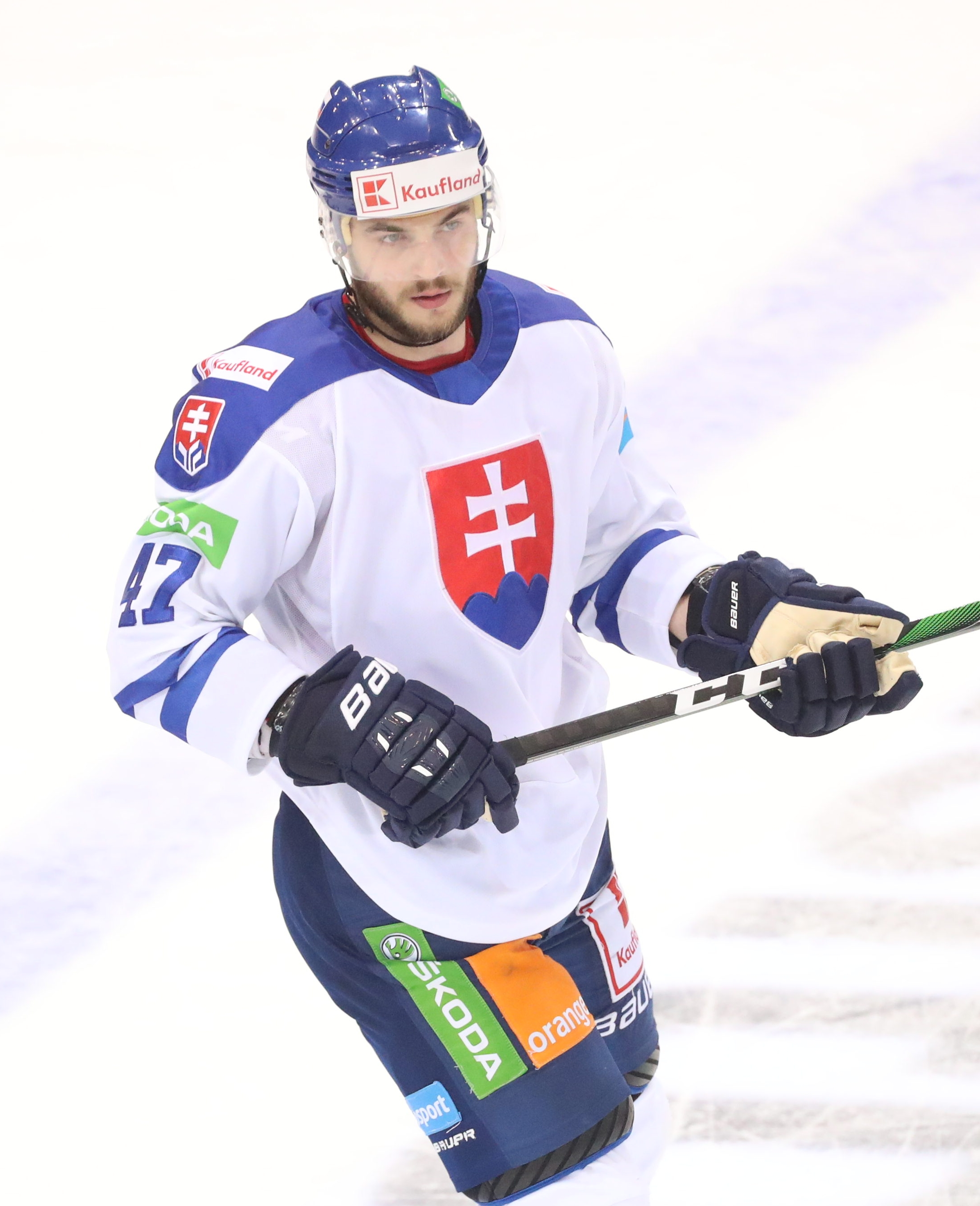
- Born: 20 June 1994 (age 31) Banská Bystrica, Slovakia
- Height: 6 ft 0 in (183 cm)
- Weight: 182 lb (83 kg; 13 st 0 lb)
- Position: Right wing
- Shoots: Left
- Slovak team Former teams: HC Košice; HC '05 Banská Bystrica; HK Orange 20; MHk 32 Liptovský Mikuláš; HC Slovan Bratislava; BK Mladá Boleslav
- National team: Slovakia
- Playing career: 2011–present

Mário Lunter (born 20 June 1994) is Slovak professional ice hockey forward who currently playing for HC Košice of the Slovak Extraliga.

== Career ==
He returned to Bratislava for a second stint from HC ’05 Banská Bystrica, securing a one-year deal on July 19, 2018.

== Career statistics ==
			Regular season					Playoffs
Season	Team	League	GP	G	A	Pts	PIM	GP	G	A	Pts	PIM
2011–12	HC '05 Banská Bystrica	Slovak	5	0	0	0	2	—	—	—	—	—
2011–12	HK Orange 20	Slovak.1	4	1	1	2	2	—	—	—	—	—
2012–13	HC '05 Banská Bystrica	Slovak	40	9	15	24	50	5	0	2	2	6
2012–13	MHk 32 Liptovský Mikuláš	Slovak.1	—	—	—	—	—	1	0	0	0	2
2013–14	HC '05 Banská Bystrica	Slovak	45	10	14	24	20	11	3	1	4	0
2014–15	HC Slovan Bratislava	KHL	31	1	0	1	12	—	—	—	—	—
2014–15	HC '05 Banská Bystrica	Slovak	10	3	1	4	0	—	—	—	—	—
2015–16	HC '05 Banská Bystrica	Slovak	25	6	4	10	35	17	4	2	6	4
2016–17	HC '05 Banská Bystrica	Slovak	31	9	13	22	4	—	—	—	—	—
2017–18	HC '05 Banská Bystrica	Slovak	24	8	6	14	16	—	—	—	—	—
2018–19	HC '05 Banská Bystrica	Slovak	3	0	1	1	2	—	—	—	—	—
2018–19	HC Slovan Bratislava	KHL	52	6	6	12	30	—	—	—	—	—
2019–20	HC '05 Banská Bystrica	Slovak	13	4	4	8	4	—	—	—	—	—
2019–20	BK Mladá Boleslav	Czech	28	5	4	9	4	—	—	—	—	—
2020–21	BK Mladá Boleslav	Czech	39	7	7	14	14	—	—	—	—	—
2021–22	BK Mladá Boleslav	Czech	45	4	4	8	18	14	2	3	5	2
2022–23	BK Mladá Boleslav	Czech	41	3	3	6	10	4	1	1	2	0
KHL totals			83	7	6	13	42	—	—	—	—	—

=== International ===
Year	Team	Event	Result	GP	G	A	Pts	PIM
2011	Slovakia	U17	10th	4	0	0	0	2
2011	Slovakia	IH18	8th	4	1	1	2	0
2012	Slovakia	WJC18 D1A	11th	5	3	4	7	8
2014	Slovakia	WJC	8th	5	1	1	2	2
2019	Slovakia	WC	9th	7	0	2	2	2
2022	Slovakia	WC	8th	7	0	2	2	0
2023	Slovakia	WC	9th	4	0	0	0	2
Junior totals				18	5	6	11	12
Senior totals				18	0	4	4	4
