= Július Šupler =

Slovak ice hockey player and coach

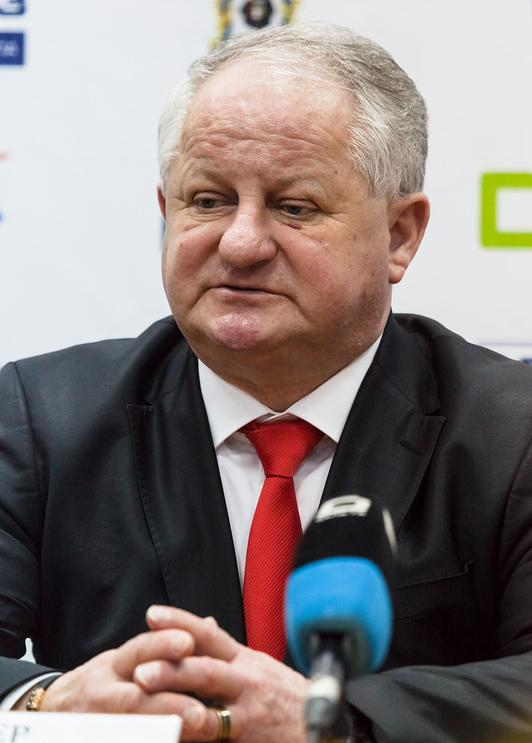
Július Šupler in 2013

Július Šupler (born 27 October 1950 in Poprad, Czechoslovakia) is a Slovak ice-hockey coach. Šupler has been coach of HC Dukla Trenčín and Riga 2000 and was the first coach of Slovakia national team.

== Playing career ==
Šupler began playing ice hockey in his hometown of Poprad and later played in Liptovský Mikuláš. In 1970–1972 he played for Slovan Bratislava and in 1972–1976 for VSŽ Košice.

== Coaching career ==
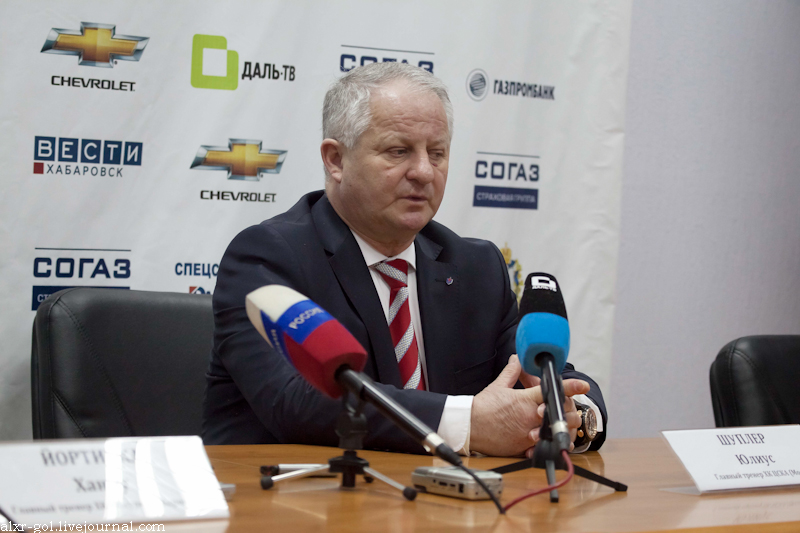
Šupler as head coach of HC CSKA Moscow

He started coaching as the assistant coach in Poprad 1979–1985, as the head coach in 1985–1987. In 1991–92 season he won Czechoslovakia title with Dukla Trenčín. Since 1993 he was the head coach of Slovakia national team. He led Slovakia to the A-category of IIHF World Championship in the least possible time, by winning the C-category in 1994 and B-category in 1995. He led the Slovakian team also to sixth place at the 1994 Olympic Tournament in Lillehammer. After the 1996 World Championships in Vienna, where Slovakia obtained 10th place, his contract with the Slovak national team was not extended.

In 1996–2006 he was coaching various teams—the Portland Winterhawks in WHL, Slovan Bratislava, and HK Riga 2000 (Latvia).

In 2006 he again became the coach of the Slovak national team. He chose Zdeno Cíger and Miroslav Miklošovič for his assistants, replacing Cíger with Peter Oremus in June 2007. Under his coaching, Slovakia obtained sixth spot at 2007 World Championships and 13th place at 2008. After the 2008 championship, he was replaced by Ján Filc.

He was the head coach of HC Donbass in 2012-13.
