= 2026 Deutschland Cup =

Tournament details
- Host country: Germany
- Venue: 1 (in 1 host city)
- Dates: 5–8 November
- Teams: 4

Final positions
- Champions: Latvia (2nd title)
- Runners-up: Germany
- Third place: Slovakia
- Fourth place: Austria

Tournament statistics
- Games played: 6
- Goals scored: 34 (5.67 per game)

The 2026 Deutschland Cup was the 37th edition of the tournament, held between 5 and 8 November 2026. This year, only the men's tournament was played as the 2026 IIHF Women's World Championship was held at the same time.

== Standings ==
Pos	Team	Pld	W	OTW	OTL	L	GF	GA	GD	Pts
1	Latvia	3	2	1	0	0	12	5	+7	8
2	Germany (H)	3	2	0	0	1	8	6	+2	6
3	Slovakia	3	1	0	1	1	11	8	+3	4
4	Austria	3	0	0	0	3	3	15	−12	0

Source: IIHF
Rules for classification: 1) points; 2) head-to-head points; 3) head-to-head goal difference; 4) head-to-head number of goals scored.
(H) Host

== Results ==
All times are local (UTC+1).

5 November 2026; 16:15	Latvia	3–2 OT (1–0, 0–1, 1–1) (OT: 1–0)	Slovakia	PSD Bank Dome, Düsseldorf

5 November 2026; 19:45	Germany	3–0 (0–0 2–0 1–0)	Austria	PSD Bank Dome, Düsseldorf

7 November 2026; 15:00	Slovakia	6–1 (0–0, 4–1, 2–0)	Austria	PSD Bank Dome, Düsseldorf

7 November 2026; 18:30	Germany	1–3 (0–0, 1–2, 0–1)	Latvia	PSD Bank Dome, Düsseldorf

8 November 2026; 11:00	Latvia	6–2 (3–0, 2–2, 1–0)	Austria	PSD Bank Dome, Düsseldorf

8 November 2026; 14:45	Germany	4–3 (0–1, 0–2, 4–0)	Slovakia	PSD Bank Dome, Düsseldorf

== See also ==
- 2026 NOCCO Hockey Games
