= Tomáš Starosta =

Slovak ice hockey player

- Born: May 20, 1981 (age 45) Trenčín, Czechoslovakia
- Height: 6 ft 0 in (183 cm)
- Weight: 198 lb (90 kg; 14 st 2 lb)
- Position: Defence
- Shoots: Left
- Slovak team Former teams: HK Dukla Trenčín; HC Dukla Senica; Neftekhimik Nizhnekamsk; Salavat Yulaev Ufa; HC Ugra; HC Slovan Bratislava
- National team: Slovakia
- Playing career: 1999–present

Tomáš Starosta (born May 20, 1981) is a Slovak professional ice hockey defenceman who is currently playing for HK Dukla Trenčín of the Slovak Extraliga.

He participated at the 2010 IIHF World Championship as a member of the Slovakia men's national ice hockey team.

== Career statistics ==
=== Regular season and playoffs ===
			Regular season					Playoffs
Season	Team	League	GP	G	A	Pts	PIM	GP	G	A	Pts	PIM
1995–96	Dukla Trenčín	SVK U18	49	5	4	9	18	—	—	—	—	—
1996–97	Dukla Trenčín	SVK U18	50	13	14	27	63	—	—	—	—	—
1997–98	Dukla Trenčín	SVK U20	28	2	0	2	4	—	—	—	—	—
1998–99	Dukla Trenčín	SVK U20	49	1	7	8	18	—	—	—	—	—
1999–2000	Dukla Trenčín	SVK U20	24	9	16	25	87	—	—	—	—	—
1999–2000	Dukla Trenčín	Slovak	35	0	0	0	8	5	0	0	0	4
1999–2000	HC Dukla Senica	SVK.2	4	0	1	1	0	—	—	—	—	—
2000–01	Dukla Trenčín	SVK U20	5	2	3	5	20	—	—	—	—	—
2000–01	Dukla Trenčín	Slovak	53	4	3	7	16	14	1	0	1	4
2001–02	Dukla Trenčín	Slovak	32	1	3	4	10	—	—	—	—	—
2002–03	Dukla Trenčín	Slovak	51	7	9	16	38	12	0	2	2	18
2003–04	Dukla Trenčín	Slovak	52	3	8	11	18	14	1	3	4	2
2004–05	Dukla Trenčín	Slovak	33	2	11	13	28	—	—	—	—	—
2004–05	Neftekhimik Nizhnekamsk	RSL	20	1	3	4	6	3	0	0	0	0
2005–06	Neftekhimik Nizhnekamsk	RSL	51	4	8	12	40	5	0	1	1	0
2006–07	Neftekhimik Nizhnekamsk	RSL	54	1	11	12	54	4	0	1	1	2
2007–08	Neftekhimik Nizhnekamsk	RSL	50	2	8	10	34	5	0	1	1	4
2008–09	Neftekhimik Nizhnekamsk	KHL	56	3	10	13	48	4	0	1	1	4
2009–10	Neftekhimik Nizhnekamsk	KHL	53	4	10	14	66	9	1	2	3	4
2010–11	Salavat Yulaev Ufa	KHL	28	1	6	7	12	2	0	0	0	4
2011–12	HC Yugra	KHL	54	4	9	13	46	5	0	2	2	4
2012–13	HC Yugra	KHL	34	2	5	7	43	—	—	—	—	—
2013–14	HC Yugra	KHL	45	5	8	13	12	—	—	—	—	—
2014–15	HC Slovan Bratislava	KHL	42	2	5	7	22	—	—	—	—	—
2015–16	HC Slovan Bratislava	KHL	51	4	6	10	26	4	1	0	1	0
2016–17	HC Slovan Bratislava	KHL	38	1	5	6	34	—	—	—	—	—
2016–17	HK Dukla Trenčín	Slovak	9	2	3	5	2	—	—	—	—	—
2017–18	HK Dukla Trenčín	Slovak	49	5	20	25	66	17	3	7	10	14
2018–19	HK Dukla Trenčín	Slovak	19	1	11	12	16	2	1	0	1	16
2019–20	HK Dukla Trenčín	Slovak	34	3	5	8	22	—	—	—	—	—
2020–21	HK Dukla Trenčín	Slovak	33	0	9	9	16	10	0	1	1	4
2021–22	HK Dukla Trenčín	Slovak	50	3	7	10	34	3	0	0	0	2
2022–23	HK Dukla Trenčín	Slovak	46	2	6	8	16	4	0	2	2	2
2023–24	HK Dukla Trenčín	Slovak	45	1	5	6	12	5	0	0	0	25
2024–25	HK Dukla Trenčín	Slovak	51	3	7	10	16	8	0	0	0	4
2025–26	HK Dukla Trenčín	Slovak	43	1	3	4	8	—	—	—	—	—
Slovak totals			635	38	110	148	326	94	6	15	21	95
RSL totals			175	8	30	38	134	17	0	3	3	6
KHL totals			401	26	64	90	309	24	2	5	7	16

=== International ===
Medal record

Representing Slovakia

Ice hockey

World Championships
Silver medal – second place	2012 Helsinki	

Year	Team	Event	GP	G	A	Pts	PIM
1999	Slovakia	WJC18	7	2	1	3	2
2000	Slovakia	WJC	6	0	0	0	0
2001	Slovakia	WJC	7	0	1	1	8
2007	Slovakia	WC	6	0	0	0	2
2008	Slovakia	WC	5	0	0	0	2
2010	Slovakia	WC	6	0	3	3	4
2012	Slovakia	WC	10	0	0	0	2
2014	Slovakia	OG	4	0	0	0	0
2018	Slovakia	OG	4	0	0	0	4
Junior totals			20	2	2	4	10
Senior totals			35	0	3	3	14
