= Vladimír Vůjtek =

Czech ice hockey player

- Born: 17 February 1972 (age 54) Ostrava, Czechoslovakia
- Height: 6 ft 0 in (183 cm)
- Weight: 196 lb (89 kg; 14 st 0 lb)
- Position: Right wing
- Shot: Right
- Played for: Montreal Canadiens; Edmonton Oilers; Tampa Bay Lightning; Atlanta Thrashers; Pittsburgh Penguins
- National team: Czech Republic
- NHL draft: 73rd overall, 1991; Montreal Canadiens
- Playing career: 1992–2007

Vladimír Vůjtek (born 17 February 1972) is a Czech former professional ice hockey right wing. He was drafted by the Montreal Canadiens in the fourth round, 73rd overall, of the 1991 NHL entry draft.

== Career ==
Vůjtek played two seasons for HC Vítkovice in the Czechoslovak Extraliga before coming to North America to play for the Western Hockey League's Tri-City Americans. He made his NHL debut with Montreal in the 1991–92 season, appearing in two games before returning the Americans. Vůjtek joined the Edmonton Oilers' organization before the 1992–93 season, and played 70 games with the Oilers over two seasons. During the 1994-95 NHL lockout, Vůjtek returned to Europe. He remained in the Extraliga and the SM-liiga of Finland until 1997, where he played for HC Vitkovice for two seasons and spent one season skating with Ässät.

Vůjtek returned to the NHL with the Tampa Bay Lightning in the 1997–98 season. He played thirty games with the Lightning before being diagnosed with having the Epstein-Barr virus, which took a toll on his energy and eventually had him miss the remainder of the season. After being unsigned by the Lightning, Vůjtek returned to the HC Vitkovice organization for another season.

On 19 July 1999, Vůjtek signed with the Atlanta Thrashers. During a preseason game against the New York Rangers, Vujtek was accidentally cut by the skate of forward Valeri Kamensky and was rushed to the hospital. He received over 100 stitches on his right cheek and underwent over two and a half hours of plastic surgery. After three regular season games with the Thrashers, Vůjtek would again return to the Czech Republic.

After two seasons with HC Sparta Praha of Extraliga and a successful season with HPK Hameenlinna, Vůjtek returned to the NHL for a third time. Vujtek was signed on 15 July 2002 by then-General Manager Craig Patrick of the Pittsburgh Penguins to a one-year, $600,000 contract. Although Vujtek showed promise during training camp as a scoring leader, it did not translate into regular season success. Vůjtek opened the 2002-03 NHL season on the second line working with linemates Alexei Kovalev and Ville Nieminen. After five games, where Vůjtek recorded one assist, Vůjtek requested his release.

In his NHL career Vůjtek appeared in 110 games scoring seven goals and adding 30 assists.

Vůjtek returned to Europe after his release from the Penguins, where he would play several seasons in the Czech Republic, Finland, Russia and Switzerland. Vůjtek initially retired after the 2005–06 season after his hometown team HC Vitkovice did not offer him a contract. HC Vitkovice at the time was coached by his father, Vladimír Vůjtek Sr.

Vůjtek skated his final season in the Extraliga with HC Oceláři Třinec, where he scored nine points in twenty-four games.

== Retirement ==
Vůjtek retired after the 2006–07 season. He is now a player agent for Eurohockey Services, co-managing the agency with former Pittsburgh Penguins teammate Michal Sivek.

== Personal ==
His father, Vladimír Vůjtek Sr., is a head coach with 27 years experience of head coaching experience with Slovak national ice hockey team and teams in the Extraliga and in Russia with both the Russian Superleague and the KHL

== Career statistics ==
=== Regular season and playoffs ===
			Regular season					Playoffs
Season	Team	League	GP	G	A	Pts	PIM	GP	G	A	Pts	PIM
1988–89	TJ Vítkovice	TCH	3	0	1	1	0	—	—	—	—	—
1989–90	TJ Vítkovice	TCH	22	3	4	7	—	7	4	3	7	—
1990–91	TJ Vítkovice	TCH	26	7	4	11	16	—	—	—	—	—
1990–91	Tri–City Americans	WHL	37	26	18	44	25	7	2	3	5	4
1991–92	Tri–City Americans	WHL	53	41	61	102	114	—	—	—	—	—
1991–92	Montreal Canadiens	NHL	2	0	0	0	0	—	—	—	—	—
1992–93	Edmonton Oilers	NHL	30	1	10	11	8	—	—	—	—	—
1992–93	Cape Breton Oilers	AHL	20	10	9	19	14	1	0	0	0	0
1993–94	Edmonton Oilers	NHL	40	4	15	19	14	—	—	—	—	—
1994–95	Cape Breton Oilers	AHL	30	10	11	21	30	—	—	—	—	—
1994–95	Las Vegas Thunder	IHL	1	0	0	0	0	—	—	—	—	—
1994–95	HC Vítkovice	ELH	18	5	8	13	51	—	—	—	—	—
1995–96	HC Vítkovice	ELH	26	6	7	13	42	4	1	1	2	0
1996–97	Ässät	SM-l	50	27	31	58	48	4	1	2	3	2
1997–98	Tampa Bay Lightning	NHL	30	2	4	6	16	—	—	—	—	—
1997–98	Adirondack Red Wings	AHL	2	1	2	3	0	—	—	—	—	—
1998–99	HC Vítkovice	ELH	46	19	30	49	65	—	—	—	—	—
1999–00	Atlanta Thrashers	NHL	3	0	0	0	0	—	—	—	—	—
1999–00	HC Sparta Praha	ELH	29	12	19	31	14	8	2	3	5	10
2000–01	HC Sparta Praha	ELH	38	11	18	29	28	13	3	6	9	4
2001–02	HPK	SM-l	45	19	39	58	38	8	4	7	11	6
2002–03	Pittsburgh Penguins	NHL	5	0	1	1	0	—	—	—	—	—
2002–03	HC Vítkovice	ELH	6	1	5	6	4	—	—	—	—	—
2002–03	Severstal Cherepovets	RSL	16	7	14	21	12	12	2	3	5	8
2003–04	HPK	SM-l	30	9	16	25	86	—	—	—	—	—
2003–04	Khimik Voskresensk	RSL	12	2	1	3	4	—	—	—	—	—
2004–05	HC Vítkovice	ELH	26	14	5	19	16	10	4	4	8	12
2005–06	HC Forward–Morges	SUI.2	20	13	16	29	59	—	—	—	—	—
2005–06	ZSC Lions	NLA	4	0	2	2	4	—	—	—	—	—
2005–06	HC Vítkovice Steel	ELH	3	0	2	2	2	4	1	0	1	0
2006–07	HC Oceláři Třinec	ELH	24	3	6	9	8	—	—	—	—	—
NHL totals			110	7	30	37	38	—	—	—	—	—
ELH totals			216	71	100	171	230	39	11	14	25	26
SM-l totals			125	55	86	141	172	12	5	9	14	8

=== International ===
Year	Team	Event	GP	G	A	Pts	PIM
1997	Czech Republic	WC	8	7	7	14	31
Senior totals			8	7	7	14	31

== Awards ==
- WHL (West) First All-Star Team 91/92
- CHL Third All-Star Team 91/92
- World Championship All-Star Team 96/97
- World Championship Bronze Medal 96/97
- World Championship Most Goals 96/97
- World Championship Most Points 96/97
- Czech Extraliga Champion 99/00
- SM-liiga All-Star Team 01/02
- SM-liiga Bronze Medal 01/02
- SM-liiga Player of the Month 01/02
