= Denis Pätoprstý =

Slovak ice hockey player

- Born: November 5, 1997 (age 27); Topoľčany, Slovakia
- Height: 6 ft 0 in (183 cm)
- Weight: 194 lb (88 kg; 13 st 12 lb)
- Position: Right winger
- Shoots: Left
- Tipos Extraliga team Former teams: HK Nitra; HC Slovan Bratislava
- Playing career: 2016–present

Denis Pätoprstý (born November 5, 1997) is a Slovak professional ice hockey right winger for HK Nitra of the Tipos Extraliga.

Pätoprstý was previously an academy player at HC Topoľčany, MHC Martin and BK Mladá Boleslav before joining HC Slovan Bratislava of the Kontinental Hockey League. He played six games for the team during the 2016–17 KHL season and scored no points before returning to Slovakia with Team Slovakia U20 as well as a return to HC Topoľčany.

In 2018, Pätoprstý signed for Tipsport Liga side HK Nitra.
