= Tomáš Surový =

Slovak ice hockey player

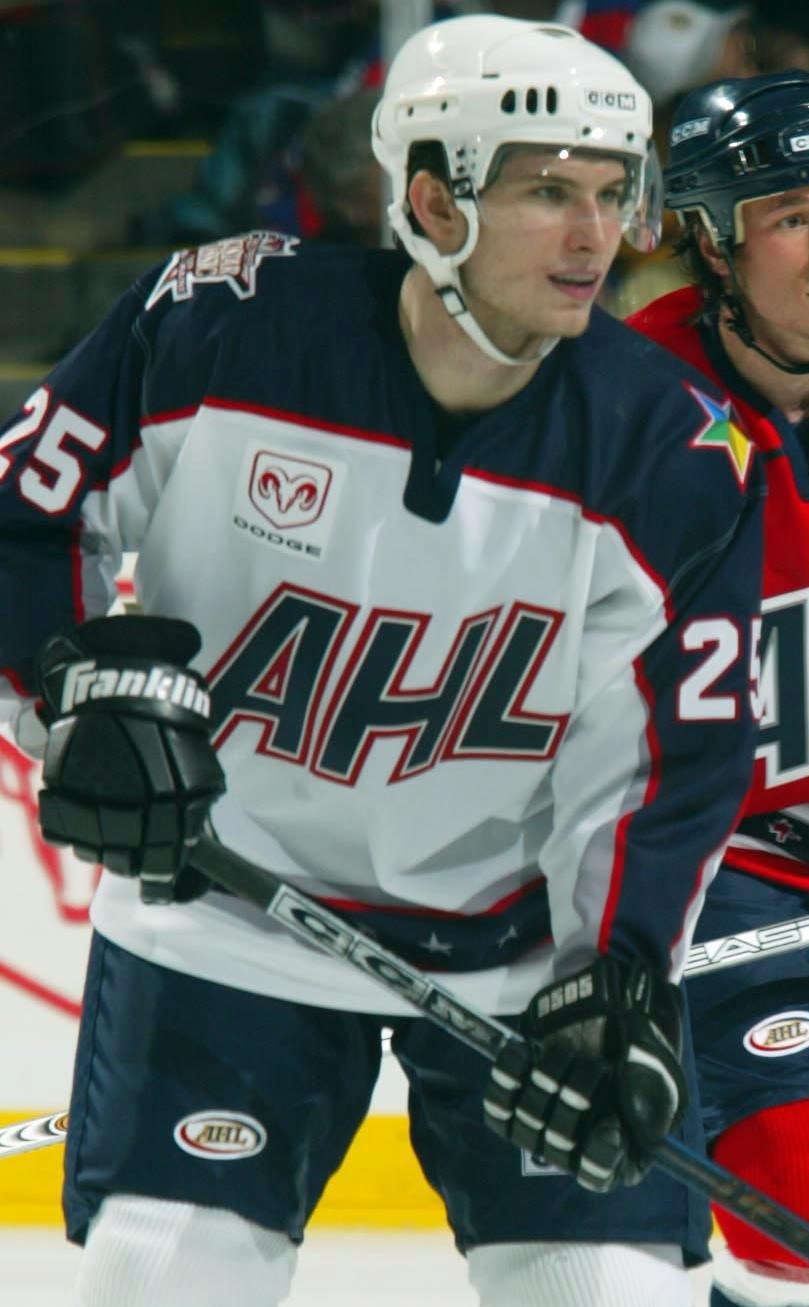
- Surový in 2003
- Born: September 24, 1981 (age 45) Banská Bystrica, Czechoslovakia
- Height: 6 ft 1 in (185 cm)
- Weight: 205 lb (93 kg; 14 st 9 lb)
- Position: Centre
- Shot: Left
- Played for: HK SKP Poprad; Pittsburgh Penguins; Luleå HF; Linköpings HC; Skellefteå AIK; Dinamo Riga; CSKA Moscow; Lev Praha; Dinamo Minsk; Slovan Bratislava
- National team: Slovakia
- NHL draft: 120th overall, 2001; Pittsburgh Penguins
- Playing career: 2001–2019
Medal record
World Championships
Silver medal – second place	2012 Finland
IIHF World U18 Championships
Bronze medal – third place	1999 Germany

Tomáš Surový (born September 24, 1981) is a Slovak former professional ice hockey left winger who last played for Slovan Bratislava of the Kontinental Hockey League (KHL).

== Playing career ==
As a youth, Surový played in the 1995 Quebec International Pee-Wee Hockey Tournament with a team from Bratislava.

Surový was drafted in the fourth round, 120th overall, by the Pittsburgh Penguins in the 2001 NHL entry draft. He called up from Pittsburgh's American Hockey League (AHL) affiliate, the Wilkes-Barre Penguins, in December 2005, where he earned the nickname "Killer" after jumping to Sidney Crosby's defence in a game against the Ottawa Senators.

The Penguins decided against re-signing him following the 2005–06 season and he signed with Luleå HF of the Swedish Elitserien.

On May 24, 2007, it became official that Surový had signed a deal with Linköpings HC, also of the Elitserien.

On July 9, 2007, Surový signed with the Phoenix Coyotes. However, his contract with Phoenix was cancelled and he returned to Linköpings HC on September 26, 2007.

In October 2009, Sureý signed a one-year contract with Skellefteå AIK of the Elitserien. After scoring 23 points in 48 games in the 2009–10 season, in July 2010, he moved to Latvia to join Kontinental Hockey League (KHL) club Dinamo Riga.

On June 7, 2013, Surový joined his fourth successive KHL club after signing a one-year contract with Dinamo Minsk.

== Career statistics ==
=== Regular season and playoffs ===
			Regular season					Playoffs
Season	Team	League	GP	G	A	Pts	PIM	GP	G	A	Pts	PIM
1996–97	Iskra Zlatý Bažant Banská Bystrica	SVK U18	45	19	17	36	34	—	—	—	—	—
1997–98	Iskra Zlatý Bažant Banská Bystrica	SVK U18	55	42	44	86	38	—	—	—	—	—
1998–99	Iskra Zlatý Bažant Banská Bystrica	SVK U20	41	17	25	42	40	—	—	—	—	—
1998–99	Iskra Zlatý Bažant Banská Bystrica	SVK	3	0	0	0	0	—	—	—	—	—
1999–2000	ŠaHK Iskra Banská Bystrica	SVK U20	10	5	10	15	2	—	—	—	—	—
1999–2000	ŠaHK Iskra Banská Bystrica	SVK.2	41	29	28	57	4	—	—	—	—	—
2000–01	HC ŠKP Poprad	SVK	53	22	28	50	30	6	2	1	3	14
2000–01	HC ŠKP Poprad	SVK U20	—	—	—	—	—	2	0	3	3	2
2001–02	Wilkes–Barre/Scranton Penguins	AHL	65	23	10	33	37	—	—	—	—	—
2002–03	Wilkes–Barre/Scranton Penguins	AHL	39	19	20	39	18	6	2	3	5	2
2002–03	Pittsburgh Penguins	NHL	26	4	7	11	10	—	—	—	—	—
2003–04	Wilkes–Barre/Scranton Penguins	AHL	30	14	15	29	14	24	6	10	16	0
2003–04	Pittsburgh Penguins	NHL	47	11	12	23	16	—	—	—	—	—
2004–05	Wilkes–Barre/Scranton Penguins	AHL	80	17	31	48	43	11	2	6	8	9
2005–06	Wilkes–Barre/Scranton Penguins	AHL	25	16	12	28	26	—	—	—	—	—
2005–06	Pittsburgh Penguins	NHL	56	12	13	25	45	—	—	—	—	—
2006–07	Luleå HF	SEL	55	23	32	55	38	4	1	1	2	29
2007–08	Linköpings HC	SEL	42	15	13	28	14	11	3	5	8	4
2008–09	Linköpings HC	SEL	33	5	6	11	12	7	0	0	0	2
2009–10	HC ’05 Banská Bystrica	SVK	5	1	2	3	2	—	—	—	—	—
2009–10	Skellefteå AIK	SEL	48	10	13	23	10	11	0	0	0	8
2010–11	Dinamo Riga	KHL	54	14	18	32	64	11	4	2	6	2
2011–12	CSKA Moscow	KHL	38	11	5	16	18	5	0	1	1	2
2012–13	Lev Praha	KHL	51	10	10	20	24	4	0	0	0	4
2013–14	Dinamo Minsk	KHL	50	9	15	24	18	—	—	—	—	—
2014–15	Slovan Bratislava	KHL	56	7	6	13	55	—	—	—	—	—
2015–16	Slovan Bratislava	KHL	59	3	13	16	42	4	1	1	2	2
2016–17	HC ’05 iClinic Banská Bystrica	SVK	44	21	24	45	12	15	8	14	22	14
2016–17	Slovan Bratislava	KHL	8	2	3	5	2	—	—	—	—	—
2017–18	HC ’05 iClinic Banská Bystrica	SVK	48	13	29	42	30	10	0	5	5	4
2018–19	HC ’05 iClinic Banská Bystrica	SVK	25	4	10	14	6	10	0	2	2	2
NHL totals			126	27	32	59	71	—	—	—	—	—
SEL totals			178	53	64	117	74	33	4	6	10	43
KHL totals			316	56	70	126	223	24	5	4	9	10

=== International ===
Year	Team	Event	GP	G	A	Pts	PIM
1999	Slovakia	WJC18	7	1	2	3	6
2000	Slovakia	WJC	7	0	0	0	2
2001	Slovakia	WJC	7	1	3	4	6
2006	Slovakia	OG	6	0	1	1	2
2006	Slovakia	WC	7	2	2	4	4
2007	Slovakia	WC	7	0	1	1	4
2009	Slovakia	WC	5	1	0	1	0
2011	Slovakia	WC	6	1	1	2	2
2012	Slovakia	WC	10	0	4	4	12
2013	Slovakia	WC	8	3	1	4	0
2014	Slovakia	OG	4	1	0	1	2
2015	Slovakia	WC	7	1	2	3	4
2018	Slovakia	OG	4	0	1	1	0
Junior totals			21	2	5	7	14
Senior totals			64	9	13	22	30
