= Jule Schiefer =

German ice hockey player (born 2001)

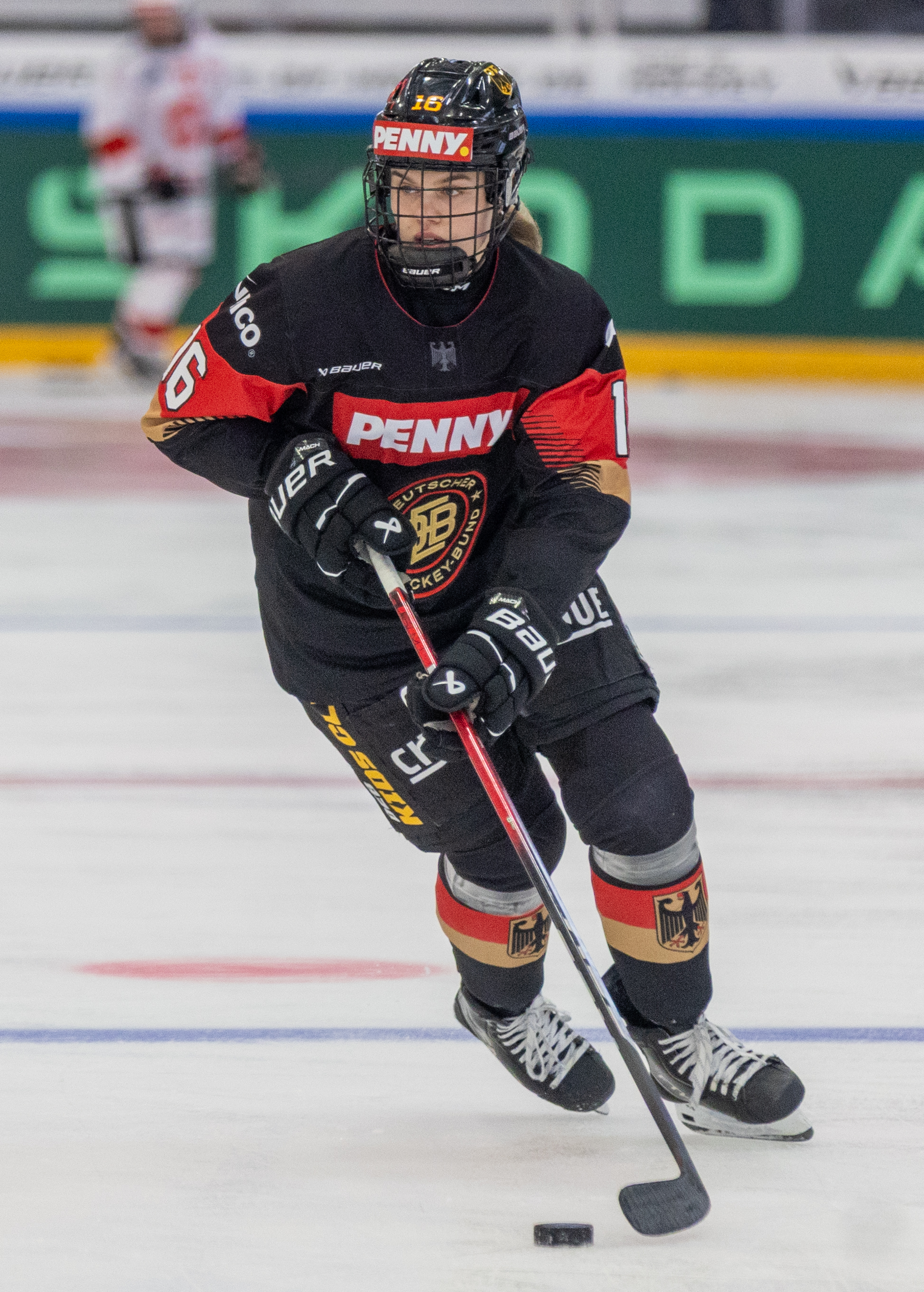
- Schiefer in 2026
- Born: 12 September 2001 (age 25) Munich, Germany
- Height: 1.73 m (5 ft 8 in)
- Weight: 68 kg (150 lb; 10 st 10 lb)
- Position: Forward
- Shoots: Left
- DFEL team Former teams: ECDC Memmingen; ERC Ingolstadt
- National team: Germany
- Playing career: 2020–present

Jule Schiefer (born 12 September 2001) is a German ice hockey player. She has been a member of the German national team since 2021 and participated in the women's ice hockey tournament at the 2026 Winter Olympics.

== Playing career ==
=== International ===
With Germany making their first appearance in women's ice hockey at the Olympics since 2014, the February 5, 2016 match versus Sweden meant that every member of the German roster were making their Olympic debut. Schiefer, wearing number 16, logged 13:03 of ice time in a 4–1 loss to Sweden.
