= Ivan Baranka =

Slovak ice hockey player (born 1985)

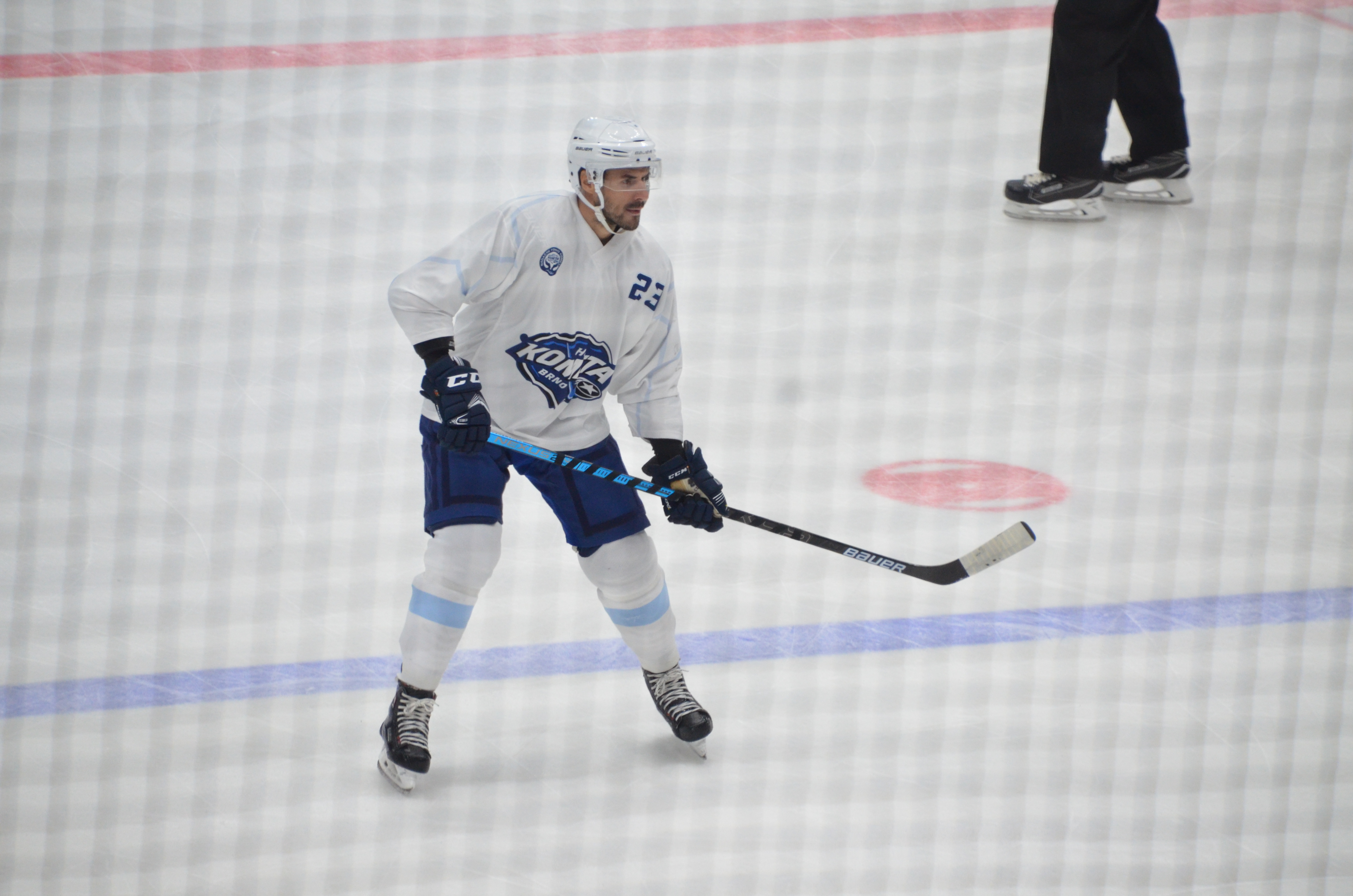
- Born: 19 May 1985 (age 40) Ilava, Czechoslovakia
- Height: 6 ft 2 in (188 cm)
- Weight: 203 lb (92 kg; 14 st 7 lb)
- Position: Defence
- Shot: Left
- Played for: New York Rangers; Spartak Moscow; Salavat Yulaev Ufa; Avangard Omsk; HC Slovan Bratislava; Rögle BK; HC Vítkovice Ridera; HC Kometa Brno
- National team: Slovakia
- NHL draft: 50th overall, 2003; New York Rangers
- Playing career: 2003–2020

Ivan Baranka (born 19 May 1985) is a Slovak former professional ice hockey defenceman who played in the National Hockey League (NHL) with the New York Rangers.

== Playing career ==
Baranka was drafted 50th overall in 2003 NHL entry draft by the New York Rangers. Prior to that he was a member of the Everett Silvertips in the WHL for two seasons.

Baranka signed his first pro contract with the Rangers on 15 September 2004. After spending 3 full seasons with the Hartford Wolf Pack of the AHL, Baranka played his first NHL game with the Rangers on 21 November 2007, in which he recorded his first point on an assist of Colton Orr's goal against the Tampa Bay Lightning.

On 15 May 2008, the Rangers confirmed that Ivan Baranka accepted an offer from Spartak Moscow, but that the Rangers will retain his rights.

== Career statistics ==
=== Regular season and playoffs ===
			Regular season					Playoffs
Season	Team	League	GP	G	A	Pts	PIM	GP	G	A	Pts	PIM
2001–02	Spartak Dubnica nad Váhom	SVK U18
2002–03	Spartak Dubnica nad Váhom	SVK U20	16	1	5	6	28	—	—	—	—	—
2002–03	Spartak Dubnica nad Váhom	SVK.2	2	0	0	0	0	—	—	—	—	—
2003–04	Everett Silvertips	WHL	58	3	12	15	69	20	3	5	8	26
2004–05	Everett Silvertips	WHL	64	7	16	23	64	11	3	1	4	6
2004–05	Hartford Wolf Pack	AHL	—	—	—	—	—	1	0	0	0	0
2005–06	Hartford Wolf Pack	AHL	59	5	16	21	87	—	—	—	—	—
2006–07	Hartford Wolf Pack	AHL	54	3	20	23	50	—	—	—	—	—
2007–08	Hartford Wolf Pack	AHL	61	5	21	26	53	5	0	2	2	2
2007–08	New York Rangers	NHL	1	0	1	1	0	—	—	—	—	—
2008–09	Spartak Moscow	KHL	47	2	8	10	50	6	1	2	3	6
2009–10	Spartak Moscow	KHL	55	10	22	32	56	10	2	2	4	12
2010–11	Spartak Moscow	KHL	50	8	9	17	48	3	1	2	3	4
2011–12	Spartak Moscow	KHL	47	5	16	21	40	—	—	—	—	—
2012–13	Salavat Yulaev Ufa	KHL	43	2	6	8	26	—	—	—	—	—
2013–14	Avangard Omsk	KHL	47	1	19	20	30	—	—	—	—	—
2014–15	HC Slovan Bratislava	KHL	45	4	8	12	46	—	—	—	—	—
2015–16	Rögle BK	SHL	40	3	6	9	20	—	—	—	—	—
2016–17	HC Vítkovice Ridera	ELH	33	4	5	9	43	5	0	0	0	2
2017–18	HC Vítkovice Ridera	ELH	47	3	21	24	36	4	1	1	2	4
2018–19	HC Vítkovice Ridera	ELH	34	3	5	8	14	—	—	—	—	—
2018–19	HC Kometa Brno	ELH	8	2	1	3	4	8	0	1	1	0
2019–20	HC Kometa Brno	ELH	33	1	2	3	8	—	—	—	—	—
NHL totals			1	0	1	1	0	—	—	—	—	—
ELH totals			122	12	32	44	97	17	1	2	3	6
KHL totals			334	32	88	120	296	19	4	6	10	22

=== International ===
Medal record

Representing Slovakia

Ice hockey

World Championships
Silver medal – second place	2012 Finland	

IIHF U18 Championships
Silver medal – second place	2003 Russia	

Year	Team	Event	Result	GP	G	A	Pts	PIM
2003	Slovakia	WJC18	2nd place, silver medalist(s)	7	1	1	2	8
2004	Slovakia	WJC	6th	6	1	1	2	8
2005	Slovakia	WJC	7th	6	0	2	2	4
2009	Slovakia	WC	10th	6	0	1	1	4
2010	Slovakia	OG	4th	2	1	0	1	0
2011	Slovakia	WC	10th	6	0	0	0	4
2012	Slovakia	WC	2nd place, silver medalist(s)	10	0	3	3	2
2014	Slovakia	OG	11th	3	0	0	0	0
2015	Slovakia	WC	9th	3	0	0	0	4
2018	Slovakia	OG	11th	4	0	0	0	2
Junior totals				19	2	4	6	20
Senior totals				34	1	4	5	16
