= Ronja Hark =

German ice hockey player (born 2003)

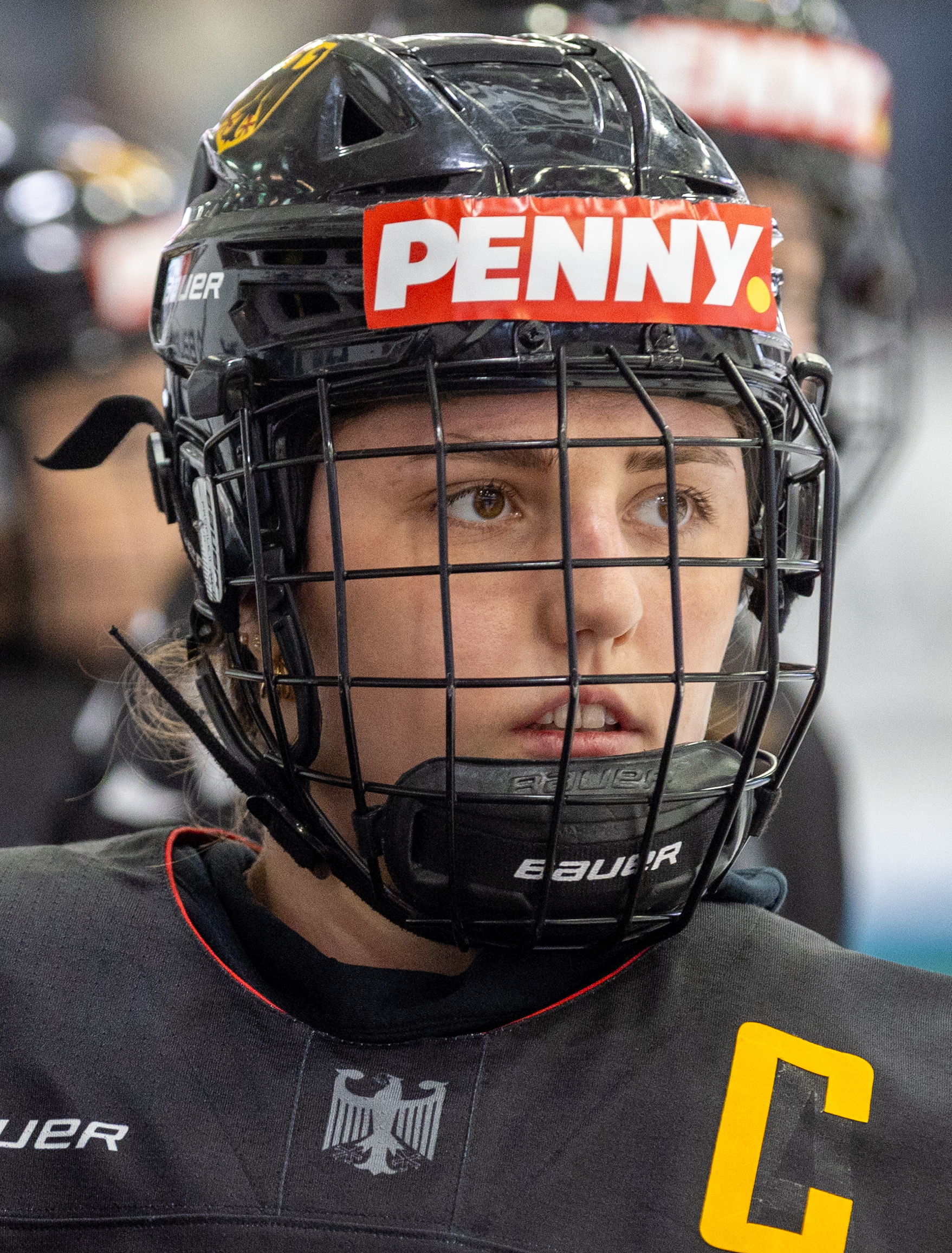
- Hark in 2026
- Born: 17 August 2003 (age 23) Peißenberg, Germany
- Height: 1.58 m (5 ft 2 in)
- Weight: 60 kg (132 lb; 9 st 6 lb)
- Position: Defense
- Shoots: Left
- DFEL team: ECDC Memmingen
- National team: Germany
- Playing career: 2020–present

Ronja Hark (born 15 August 2003) is a German ice hockey player. She is a member of the Germany women's national ice hockey team that participated in women's ice hockey tournament at the 2026 Winter Olympics.

== Playing career ==
=== International ===
Hark was named an alternate captain for Germany at the 2026 Winter Olympics.

With Germany making their first appearance in women's ice hockey at the Olympics since 2014, the 5 February 2016 match versus Sweden meant that every member of the German roster were making their Olympic debut. Sweden. Jobst-Smith led all players with 25:34 of ice time. She scored on Germany's first shot on goal in the game in a 4–1 loss. Hark, wearing number 8, logged 22:39 of ice time in a 4–1 loss to Sweden.
