= Vladimír Vůjtek (ice hockey, born 1947) =

Czech ice hockey coach and former player (born 1947)

- Born: 17 May 1947 (age 78); Klimkovice, Czechoslovakia
- Occupation: Ice hockey coach

Vladimír Vůjtek Sr. (born 17 May 1947) is a Czech former ice hockey coach and former player. As a coach he won Russian Superleague twice with Lokomotiv Yaroslavl in 2002 and 2003.

2012 – Won silver medal on Ice Hockey World Championships with Slovakia

Vladimír Vůjtek Sr. is the father of Vladimír Vůjtek Jr.
