= Slovakia men's national ice hockey team =

Slovakia
- Nickname: Naši chlapci (Our Boys), Repre (The Representation)
- Association: Slovak Ice Hockey Federation
- General manager: Miroslav Šatan
- Head coach: Vladimír Országh
- Assistants: Peter Frühauf; Ján Pardavý
- Captain: Marek Hrivík
- Most games: Miroslav Šatan (205)
- Top scorer: Miroslav Šatan (83)
- Most points: Miroslav Šatan (167)
- Home stadium: Ondrej Nepela Arena
- Team colors
- IIHF code: SVK
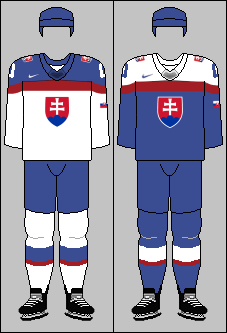

Ranking
- Current IIHF: 8 (3 June 2026)
- Highest IIHF: 3 (2004)
- Lowest IIHF: 11 (2017)

First international
- Slovakia 2–2 France (Rouen, France; 12 February 1993)

Biggest win
- Slovakia 20–0 Bulgaria (Poprad, Slovakia; 18 March 1994)

Biggest defeat
- Czech Republic 8–0 Slovakia (Kloten, Switzerland; 2 May 2009)

Olympics
- Appearances: 9 (first in 1994)
- Medals: Bronze: (2022)

IIHF World Championships
- Appearances: 32 (first in 1994)
- Best result: (gold) Gold: (2002)

International record (W–L–T)
- 408–328–49

Medal record

Olympic Games
Bronze medal – third place	2022 Beijing	Team

World Championships
Gold medal – first place	2002 Sweden	
Silver medal – second place	2000 Russia	
Silver medal – second place	2012 Finland/Sweden	
Bronze medal – third place	2003 Finland	

The Slovakia men's national ice hockey team is the national ice hockey team of Slovakia and is controlled by the Slovak Ice Hockey Federation. A successor to the Czechoslovakia national team, it is one of the most successful national ice hockey teams in the world. The team's general manager is Miroslav Šatan and their head coach is Vladimír Országh.

Slovakia has won four medals at the World Championships, including a gold medal in 2002 in Sweden and a bronze medal at the 2022 Winter Olympics.

== History ==
The Slovak national team was formed following the breakup of Czechoslovakia, as the country was split into the Czech Republic and Slovakia. Although the Czechs were allowed to compete in the highest pool (A), the IIHF ruled that because fewer players of the former Czechoslovak team were Slovaks, Slovakia would be required to start international play in pool C. However, Slovakia's play in the lower pools won back-to-back promotions to pool A by 1996.

Slovakia's first appearance in an elite ice hockey competition was at the 1994 Winter Olympics in Lillehammer. With a lineup led by star Peter Šťastný, the Slovaks finished first in their group with three wins and two ties before losing to Russia in overtime in the quarterfinals. In the 1998 Winter Olympics in Nagano and 2002 Winter Olympic Games in Salt Lake City, the Slovak team did not use its National Hockey League (NHL) players in the preliminary round due to a scheduling conflict. This affected all of the smaller countries, but devastated the Slovaks as most of their best players were from NHL teams. The NHL only shut down its schedule in time for the second group stage, and thus Slovakia failed to qualify among the final eight teams both times. This turn of events was troubling to the entire hockey community, and the rules were changed for the 2006 Winter Olympic Games in Turin, Italy.

Following the successful years for the Slovaks in the early 2000s at the World Championships, when they won the silver in St. Petersburg at the 2000 edition after a loss to the Czechs, winning the only title so far in Goteburg at the 2002 edition and securing bronze in Helsinki (2003), the results of Slovakia worsened and Slovakia began to drop out in the quarterfinals. The closest Slovakia came to relegation into Division I was in 2008, when they avoided relegation only thanks to two victories over Slovenia in the Relegation Round. These were followed by three subsequent eliminations in the qualifying round (round of 12), including one at a 2011 edition Slovakia hosted in Bratislava and Košice for the first time since the dissolution of Czechoslovakia.

However, Slovakia unexpectedly received silver medal at the 2012 edition, again won in Helsinki. This was the first tournament after the introduction of the new tournament format, followed by the quarterfinals. Due to the surprise this medal was after a number of unsuccessful tournaments, it was regarded as with a value of a triumphal gold. Moreover, the following year, Slovakia failed to repeat medal successes again or even qualify for the quarterfinals, except 2013.

In the following years, the team narrowly missed out on a quarterfinal spot for three consecutive years. In 2017, Slovakia recorded its worst tournament in history by placing 14th, narrowly escaping elimination thanks to an overtime victory against Italy. After the unsuccessful World Championships, Craig Ramsay was appointed as the head coach with the goal of improving the results and playstyle of the national team. Despite missing out on the quarterfinals again in 2018 in Denmark and one year later on home ice, the overall appearance of the team looked much better than the years prior.

In the Winter Olympic Games, Slovakia's highest achievement prior to 2022 was fourth place in Vancouver 2010. In the tournament, it won against favourites Russia and Sweden, and lost against Canada in the semi-finals and against Finland in the bronze medal game. In 2022, the Slovaks claimed their first ever Olympic medal after defeating Sweden 4–0 in a bronze medal game.

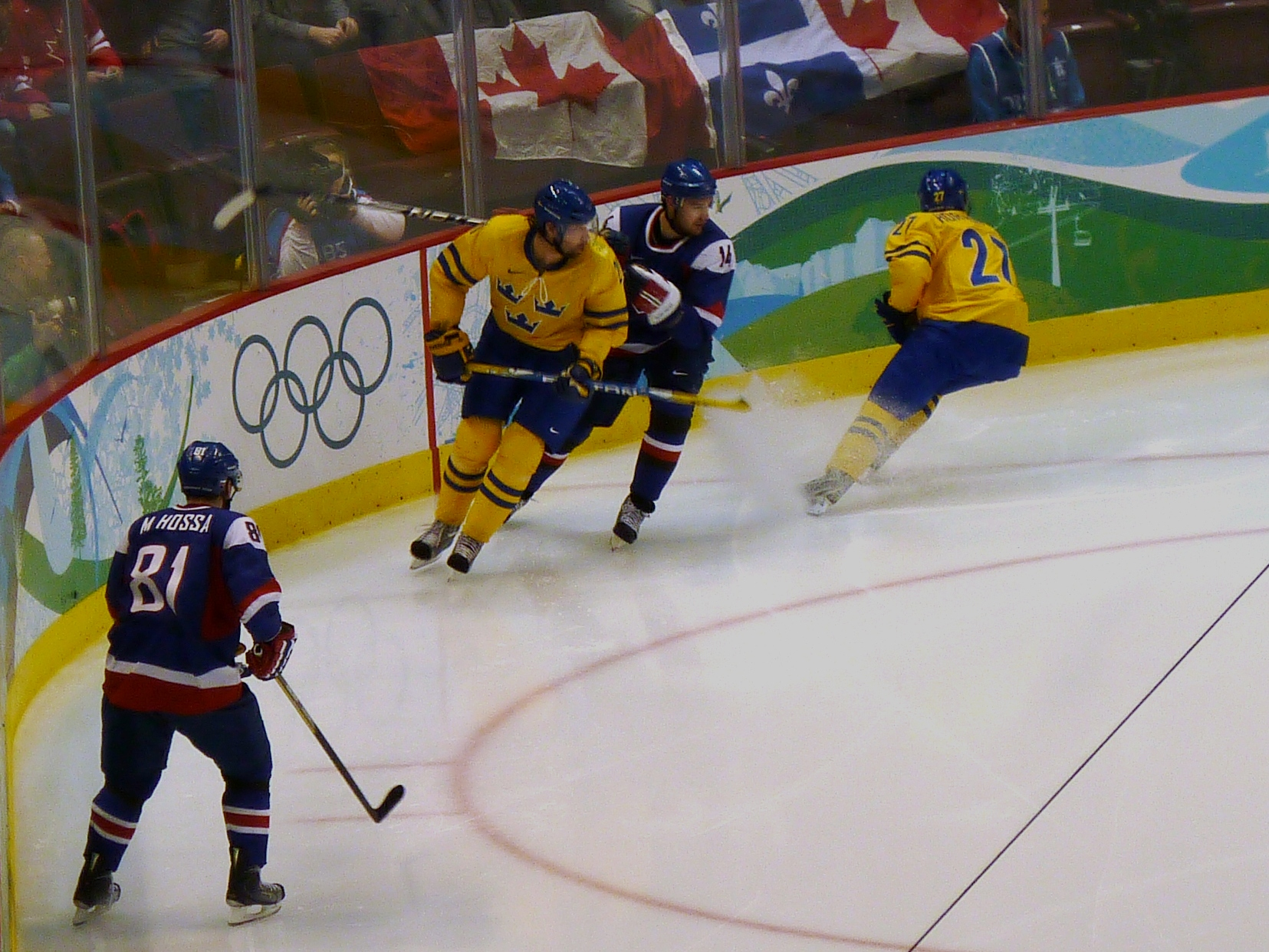
Slovakia vs Sweden at the 2010 Olympics

== Tournament record ==
=== Olympic Games ===
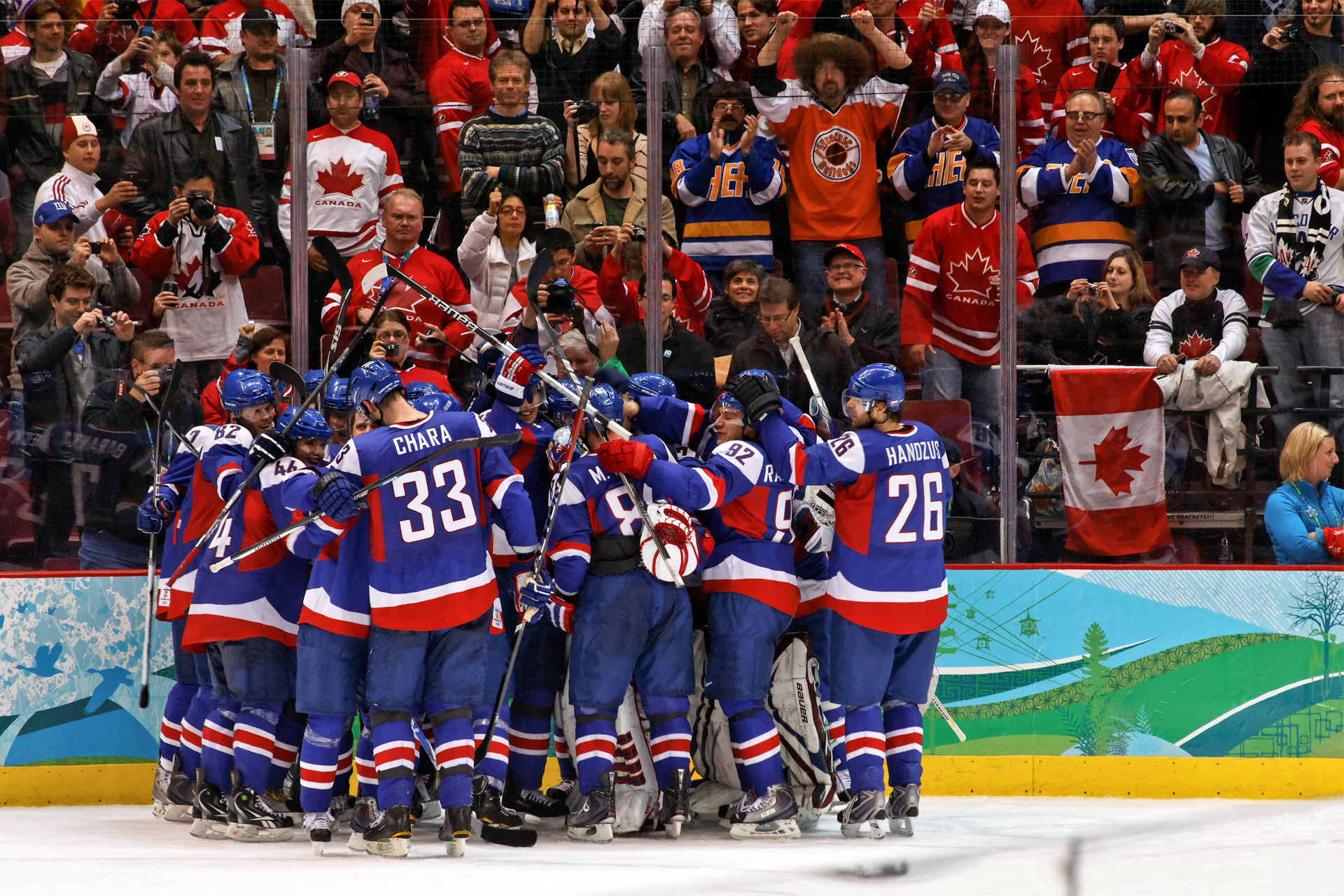
Slovak team celebrates their victory over Sweden during the 2010 Winter Olympics.

Games	GP	W	OW	T	OL	L	GF	GA	Coach	Captain	Finish
1920–1992	Part of Czechoslovakia										
(Norway) 1994 Lillehammer	8	4	0	2	1	1	35	29	Július Šupler	Peter Šťastný	6th
(Japan) 1998 Nagano	4	1	0	1	0	2	11	13	Ján Šterbák	Zdeno Cíger	10th
(United States) 2002 Salt Lake City	4	1	0	2	0	1	15	13	Ján Filc	Miroslav Šatan	13th
(Italy) 2006 Turin	6	5	0	0	0	1	19	11	František Hossa	Pavol Demitra	5th
(Canada) 2010 Vancouver	7	3	1	—	0	3	22	18	Ján Filc	Zdeno Chára	4th
(Russia) 2014 Sochi	4	0	0	—	1	3	5	16	(Czech Republic) Vladimír Vůjtek	Zdeno Chára	11th
(South Korea) 2018 Pyeongchang	4	1	0	—	1	2	7	12	(Canada) Craig Ramsay	Tomáš Surový	11th
(China) 2022 Beijing	7	3	1	—	0	3	19	16	(Canada) Craig Ramsay	Marek Hrivík	(bronze) Bronze
(Italy) 2026 Milan / Cortina d'Ampezzo	6	3	0	—	0	3	19	22	Vladimír Országh	Tomáš Tatar	4th
(France) 2030 French Alps	Future event										

Totals
Games	Gold	Silver	Bronze	Total
8	0	0	1	1

=== World Championship ===
==== Lower divisions ====
Division	Championship	GP	W	OW	T	OL	L	GF	GA	Coach	Captain	Finish	Rank
C1	(Slovakia) 1994 Poprad, Spišská Nová Ves	6	4	–	2	–	0	43	3	Július Šupler	Oto Haščák	Winner, Promoted	1st
B	(Slovakia) 1995 Bratislava	7	7	–	0	–	0	60	15	Július Šupler	Peter Šťastný	Winner, Promoted	1st

==== Top division ====
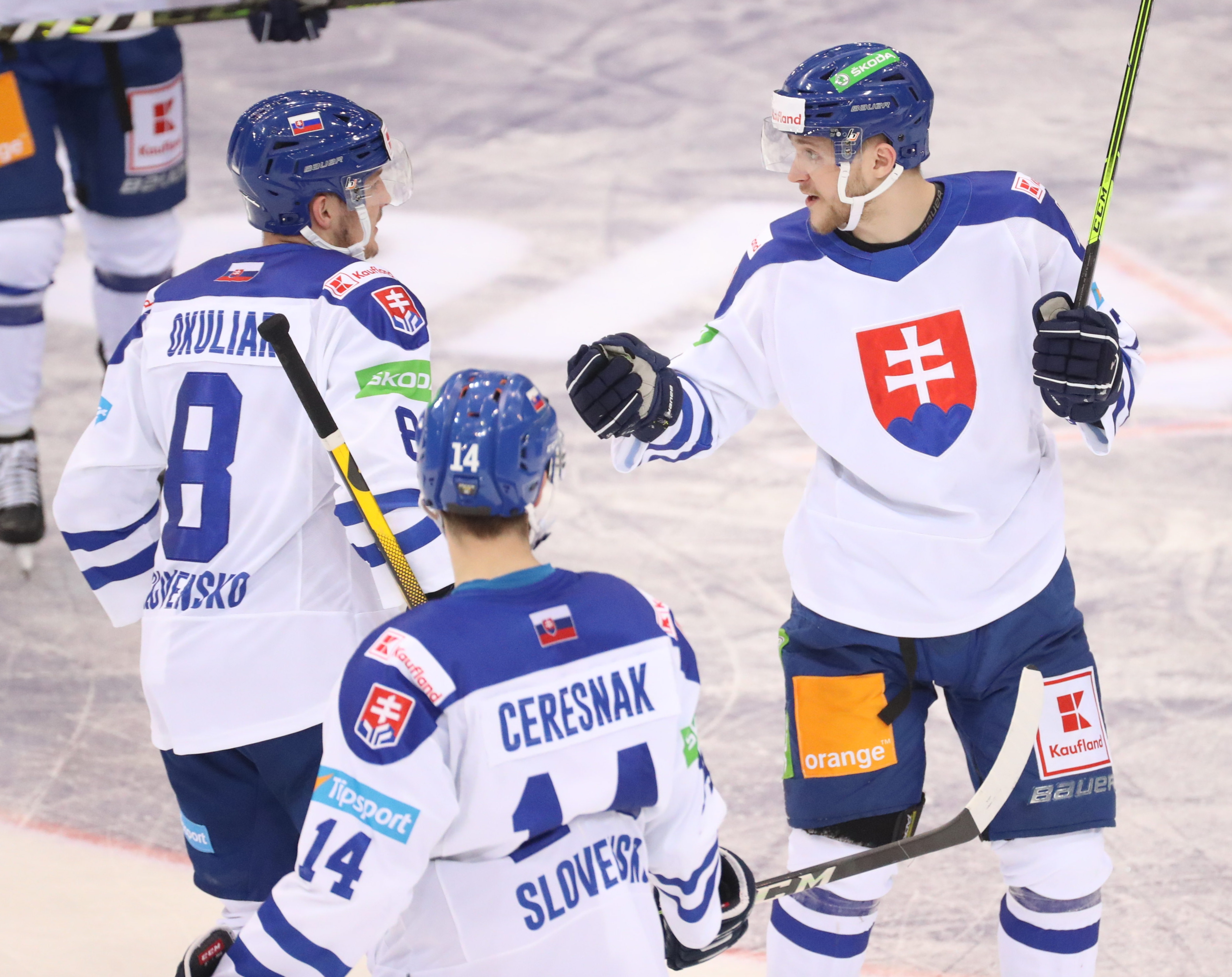
Preseason match in Dresden in preparation for the 2022 IIHF World Championship: Slovakia vs. Germany

Championship	GP	W	OTW	T	OTL	L	GF	GA	Coach	Captain	Finish	Rank
1920–1992	As part of Czechoslovakia											
(Austria) 1996 Vienna	5	1	–	1	–	3	13	16	Július Šupler	Oto Haščák	Group Round	10th
(Finland) 1997 Helsinki, Tampere, Turku	8	3	–	1	–	4	20	23	Jozef Golonka	Zdeno Cíger	Consolation Round	9th
(Switzerland) 1998 Basel, Zürich	6	2	–	2	–	2	11	12	Ján Šterbák	Zdeno Cíger	Second round	7th
(Norway) 1999 Oslo, Hamar, Lillehammer	6	2	–	1	–	3	22	21	Ján Šterbák	Zdeno Cíger	Second round	7th
(Russia) 2000 St. Petersburg	9	5	0	1	0	3	34	22	Ján Filc	Miroslav Šatan	Final	(silver) Silver
(Germany) 2001 Nuremberg, Cologne, Hanover	7	3	0	0	0	4	20	18	Ján Filc	Zdeno Chára	Quarter-finals	7th
(Sweden) 2002 Gothenburg, Karlstad, Jönköping	9	7	1	0	0	1	37	22	Ján Filc	Miroslav Šatan	Champions	(gold) Gold
(Finland) 2003 Helsinki, Tampere, Turku	9	7	0	1	0	1	45	17	František Hossa	Miroslav Šatan	3rd Place Game	(bronze) Bronze
(Czech Republic) 2004 Prague, Ostrava	9	5	0	2	1	1	24	9	František Hossa	Miroslav Šatan	3rd Place Game	4th
(Austria) 2005 Vienna, Innsbruck	7	4	0	1	0	2	19	17	František Hossa	Miroslav Šatan	Quarter-finals	5th
(Latvia) 2006 Riga	7	3	0	1	0	3	26	14	František Hossa	Marián Hossa	Quarter-finals	8th
(Russia) 2007 Moscow	7	4	0	–	0	3	24	23	Július Šupler	Miroslav Šatan	Quarter-finals	6th
(Canada) 2008 Quebec City, Halifax	5	2	1	–	0	2	18	12	Július Šupler	Róbert Petrovický	Relegation Round	13th
(Switzerland) 2009 Bern, Kloten	6	1	1	–	2	2	12	24	Ján Filc	Ľuboš Bartečko	Second round	10th
(Germany) 2010 Cologne, Mannheim, Gelsenkirchen	6	2	0	–	0	4	13	19	(Canada) Glen Hanlon	Richard Lintner	Second round	12th
(Slovakia) 2011 Bratislava, Košice	6	2	0	–	0	4	16	15	(Canada) Glen Hanlon	Pavol Demitra	Second round	10th
(Finland) (Sweden) 2012 Helsinki, Stockholm	10	7	0	–	0	3	30	23	(Czech Republic) Vladimír Vůjtek	Zdeno Chára	Final	(silver) Silver
(Sweden) (Finland) 2013 Stockholm, Helsinki	8	3	0	–	1	4	22	20	(Czech Republic) Vladimír Vůjtek	Miroslav Šatan	Quarter-finals	8th
(Belarus) 2014 Minsk	7	3	0	–	1	3	20	21	(Czech Republic) Vladimír Vůjtek	Miroslav Šatan	Group stage	9th
(Czech Republic) 2015 Prague, Ostrava	7	1	2	–	2	2	17	19	(Czech Republic) Vladimír Vůjtek	Tomáš Kopecký	Group stage	9th
(Russia) 2016 Moscow, St. Petersburg	7	2	1	–	0	4	15	23	Zdeno Cíger	Andrej Sekera	Group stage	9th
(Germany) (France) 2017 Cologne, Paris	7	0	1	–	2	4	12	28	Zdeno Cíger	Vladimír Dravecký	Group stage	14th
(Denmark) 2018 Copenhagen, Herning	7	3	0	–	2	2	19	20	(Canada) Craig Ramsay	Andrej Sekera	Group stage	9th
(Slovakia) 2019 Bratislava, Košice	7	3	1	–	0	3	28	19	(Canada) Craig Ramsay	Andrej Sekera	Group stage	9th
2020	Cancelled due to the coronavirus pandemic											
(Latvia) 2021 Riga	8	4	0	–	0	4	18	28	(Canada) Craig Ramsay	Marek Ďaloga	Quarter-finals	8th
(Finland) 2022 Helsinki, Tampere	8	4	0	–	0	4	25	23	(Canada) Craig Ramsay	Tomáš Tatar	Quarter-finals	8th
(Finland) (Latvia) 2023 Tampere, Riga	7	3	0	–	2	2	15	15	(Canada) Craig Ramsay	Marek Hrivík	Group stage	9th
(Czech Republic) 2024 Prague, Ostrava	8	3	1	–	1	3	29	29	(Canada) Craig Ramsay	Tomáš Tatar	Quarter-finals	7th
(Sweden) (Denmark) 2025 Stockholm, Herning	7	2	0	–	1	4	9	24	Vladimír Országh	Matúš Sukeľ	Group stage	11th
(Switzerland) 2026 Zurich, Fribourg	7	3	1	–	0	3	21	19	Vladimír Országh	Marek Hrivík	Group stage	9th
(Germany) 2027 Düsseldorf, Mannheim	Future event											

=== World Cup ===
Year	GP	W	OW	T	OL	L	GF	GA	Coach	Captain	Finish	Rank
1996	3	0	–	0	–	3	9	19	Jozef Golonka		Round 1	7th
2004	4	0	0	0	0	4	4	18	Ján Filc		Quarter-finals	8th

At the 2016 edition, Slovakia was not represented. Instead 6 Slovak players were a part of Team Europe, which was led by Slovak general manager Miroslav Šatan.

=== Deutschland Cup ===
- (gold) Gold medal (1997, 2006, 2011, 2016, 2024)
- (silver) Silver medal (1994, 2001, 2017, 2021, 2023, 2025)
- (bronze) Bronze medal (2000, 2004, 2005, 2012, 2014, 2018, 2026)

== Team ==
=== Current roster ===
Roster for the 2026 IIHF World Championship.

Head coach: Vladimír Országh

No.	Pos.	Name	Height	Weight	Birthdate	Team
4	D	Jakub Meliško	1.83 m (6 ft 0 in)	85 kg (187 lb)	25 June 1996 (age 30)	(Slovakia) HK Dukla Michalovce
6	D	Jozef Viliam Kmec	1.89 m (6 ft 2 in)	98 kg (216 lb)	2 January 2004 (age 22)	(United States) Henderson Silver Knights
7	D	Maxim Štrbák	1.89 m (6 ft 2 in)	91 kg (201 lb)	13 April 2005 (age 21)	(United States) Rochester Americans
8	F	Oliver Okuliar	1.87 m (6 ft 2 in)	86 kg (190 lb)	24 May 2000 (age 26)	(Sweden) Skellefteå AIK
9	F	Filip Mešár	1.79 m (5 ft 10 in)	84 kg (185 lb)	3 January 2004 (age 22)	(Canada) Laval Rocket
10	F	Adam Sýkora	1.80 m (5 ft 11 in)	88 kg (194 lb)	7 September 2004 (age 22)	(United States) New York Rangers
12	D	Samuel Kňažko	1.86 m (6 ft 1 in)	86 kg (190 lb)	7 August 2002 (age 24)	(Czech Republic) HC Vítkovice Ridera
13	D	František Gajdoš	1.80 m (5 ft 11 in)	87 kg (192 lb)	7 June 2001 (age 25)	(Czech Republic) HC Litvínov
15	F	Jakub Minárik	1.93 m (6 ft 4 in)	97 kg (214 lb)	6 July 2000 (age 26)	(Czech Republic) HC Energie Karlovy Vary
21	F	Sebastián Čederle	1.85 m (6 ft 1 in)	95 kg (209 lb)	21 February 2000 (age 26)	(Slovakia) HK Nitra
22	F	Kristián Pospíšil	1.88 m (6 ft 2 in)	99 kg (218 lb)	22 April 1996 (age 30)	(Czech Republic) HC Kometa Brno
23	F	Adam Liška	1.80 m (5 ft 11 in)	84 kg (185 lb)	14 October 1999 (age 27)	(Russia) Severstal Cherepovets
26	D	Luka Radivojevič	1.78 m (5 ft 10 in)	84 kg (185 lb)	3 January 2007 (age 19)	(United States) Boston College Eagles
27	F	Marek Hrivík – **C**	1.86 m (6 ft 1 in)	92 kg (203 lb)	28 August 1991 (age 35)	(Czech Republic) HC Vítkovice Ridera
30	G	Adam Gajan	1.91 m (6 ft 3 in)	82 kg (181 lb)	6 May 2004 (age 22)	(United States) Rockford IceHogs
31	G	Samuel Hlavaj	1.93 m (6 ft 4 in)	99 kg (218 lb)	29 May 2001 (age 25)	(United States) Iowa Wild
33	G	Eugen Rabčan	1.90 m (6 ft 3 in)	93 kg (205 lb)	28 June 2001 (age 25)	(Slovakia) HC MONACObet Banská Bystrica
42	F	Aurel Nauš	1.73 m (5 ft 8 in)	80 kg (180 lb)	1 April 1998 (age 28)	(Slovakia) HK Poprad
44	D	Mislav Rosandić	1.80 m (5 ft 11 in)	86 kg (190 lb)	26 January 1995 (age 31)	(Slovakia) HC Košice
64	D	Patrik Koch	1.86 m (6 ft 1 in)	86 kg (190 lb)	8 December 1996 (age 29)	(Czech Republic) Oceláři Třinec
72	F	Andrej Kollár	1.88 m (6 ft 2 in)	95 kg (209 lb)	4 November 1999 (age 27)	(Czech Republic) HC Kometa Brno
76	F	Martin Pospíšil – **A**	1.88 m (6 ft 2 in)	84 kg (185 lb)	19 November 1999 (age 26)	(Canada) Calgary Flames
77	F	Martin Faško-Rudáš – **A**	1.85 m (6 ft 1 in)	82 kg (181 lb)	10 August 2000 (age 26)	(Czech Republic) HC Bílí Tygři Liberec
83	F	Servác Petrovský	1.79 m (5 ft 10 in)	81 kg (179 lb)	10 August 2004 (age 22)	(Czech Republic) HC Bílí Tygři Liberec
88	F	Martin Chromiak	1.85 m (6 ft 1 in)	90 kg (200 lb)	20 August 2002 (age 24)	(United States) Ontario Reign

=== 2026 Olympics roster ===
The first six players of Slovakia's roster were announced on 16 June 2025. The remainder of the roster was named on 8 January 2026. On 28 January 2026, Marek Hrivík was ruled out due to injury, and replaced by Lukáš Cingel. On 9 February, Tomáš Tatar was named Slovakia's captain, with Erik Černák and Martin Fehérváry serving as alternate captains.

Head coach: Vladimír Országh

No.	Pos.	Name	Height	Weight	Birthdate	Team
6	F	Lukáš Cingel	1.88 m (6 ft 2 in)	90 kg (198 lb)	10 June 1992 (aged 33)	(Czech Republic) Kometa Brno
8	F	Oliver Okuliar	1.88 m (6 ft 2 in)	86 kg (190 lb)	24 May 2000 (aged 25)	(Sweden) Skellefteå AIK
11	F	Miloš Kelemen	1.85 m (6 ft 1 in)	97 kg (214 lb)	6 July 1999 (aged 26)	(Czech Republic) Dynamo Pardubice
14	D	Peter Čerešňák	1.91 m (6 ft 3 in)	98 kg (216 lb)	26 January 1993 (aged 33)	(Czech Republic) Dynamo Pardubice
15	F	Dalibor Dvorský	1.85 m (6 ft 1 in)	93 kg (205 lb)	15 July 2005 (aged 20)	(United States) St. Louis Blues
17	D	Šimon Nemec	1.83 m (6 ft 0 in)	94 kg (207 lb)	15 February 2004 (aged 21)	(United States) New Jersey Devils
20	F	Juraj Slafkovský	1.93 m (6 ft 4 in)	103 kg (227 lb)	30 March 2004 (aged 21)	(Canada) Montreal Canadiens
21	F	Adam Ružička	1.93 m (6 ft 4 in)	104 kg (229 lb)	11 May 1999 (aged 26)	(Russia) Spartak Moscow
23	F	Adam Liška	1.80 m (5 ft 11 in)	84 kg (185 lb)	14 October 1999 (aged 26)	(Russia) Severstal Cherepovets
28	D	Martin Gernát	1.93 m (6 ft 4 in)	94 kg (207 lb)	11 April 1993 (aged 32)	(Russia) Lokomotiv Yaroslavl
29	D	Michal Ivan	1.85 m (6 ft 1 in)	90 kg (198 lb)	8 November 1999 (aged 26)	(Czech Republic) Bílí Tygři Liberec
30	G	Adam Gajan	1.91 m (6 ft 3 in)	82 kg (181 lb)	6 May 2004 (aged 21)	(United States) Minnesota Duluth Bulldogs
31	G	Samuel Hlavaj	1.93 m (6 ft 4 in)	99 kg (218 lb)	29 May 2001 (aged 24)	(United States) Iowa Wild
33	G	Stanislav Škorvánek	1.88 m (6 ft 2 in)	88 kg (194 lb)	31 January 1996 (aged 30)	(Czech Republic) Mountfield HK
34	F	Peter Cehlárik	1.88 m (6 ft 2 in)	94 kg (207 lb)	2 August 1995 (aged 30)	(Sweden) Leksands IF
42	D	Martin Fehérváry – **A**	1.88 m (6 ft 2 in)	95 kg (209 lb)	6 October 1999 (aged 26)	(United States) Washington Capitals
49	F	Samuel Takáč	1.83 m (6 ft 0 in)	92 kg (203 lb)	3 December 1991 (aged 34)	(Slovakia) Slovan Bratislava
52	D	Martin Marinčin	1.96 m (6 ft 5 in)	95 kg (209 lb)	18 February 1992 (aged 33)	(Czech Republic) Oceláři Třinec
64	D	Patrik Koch	1.85 m (6 ft 1 in)	86 kg (190 lb)	8 December 1996 (aged 29)	(Czech Republic) Oceláři Třinec
76	F	Martin Pospíšil	1.88 m (6 ft 2 in)	94 kg (207 lb)	19 November 1999 (aged 26)	(Canada) Calgary Flames
79	F	Libor Hudáček	1.78 m (5 ft 10 in)	80 kg (176 lb)	7 September 1990 (aged 35)	(Czech Republic) Oceláři Třinec
81	D	Erik Černák – **A**	1.93 m (6 ft 4 in)	103 kg (227 lb)	28 May 1997 (aged 28)	(United States) Tampa Bay Lightning
84	F	Pavol Regenda	1.93 m (6 ft 4 in)	102 kg (225 lb)	7 December 1999 (aged 26)	(United States) San Jose Sharks
90	F	Tomáš Tatar – **C**	1.78 m (5 ft 10 in)	82 kg (181 lb)	1 December 1990 (aged 35)	(Switzerland) EV Zug
91	F	Matúš Sukeľ	1.75 m (5 ft 9 in)	77 kg (170 lb)	23 January 1996 (aged 30)	(Czech Republic) HC Litvínov

=== 2002 World Championship: Gold winning roster ===
Goalies

- Ján Lašák
- Rastislav Staňa
- Miroslav Šimonovič

Defensemen

- Jerguš Bača
- Ladislav Čierny
- Radoslav Hecl
- Richard Lintner
- Dušan Milo
- Peter Smrek
- Martin Štrbák
- Ľubomír Višňovský

Forwards

- Ľuboš Bartečko
- Peter Bondra
- Michal Handzuš
- Miroslav Hlinka
- Ladislav Nagy
- Vladimír Országh
- Žigmund Pálffy
- Miroslav Šatan
- Jozef Stümpel
- Rastislav Pavlikovský
- Róbert Petrovický
- Radovan Somík
- Róbert Tomík
- Marek Uram
- Peter Pucher

=== 2012 World Championship ===
Goalies

- Ján Laco
- Peter Hamerlík
- Július Hudáček

Defensemen

- Michal Sersen
- Ivan Baranka
- Tomáš Starosta
- René Vydarený
- Zdeno Chára
- Andrej Sekera
- Dominik Graňák
- Kristián Kudroč

Forwards

- Miroslav Šatan
- Libor Hudáček
- Marek Hovorka
- Michal Handzuš
- Tomáš Surový
- Mário Bližňák
- Milan Bartovič
- Juraj Mikuš
- Marcel Hossa
- Tomáš Kopecký
- Marcel Haščák
- Tomáš Tatar
- Michel Miklík
- Branko Radivojevič

=== 2022 Winter Olympics ===
Goalies

- Matej Tomek
- Patrik Rybár
- Branislav Konrád

Defensemen

- Šimon Nemec
- Mislav Rosandić
- Peter Čerešňák
- Samuel Kňažko
- Martin Gernát
- Martin Marinčin
- Michal Čajkovský
- Marek Ďaloga

Forwards

- Peter Zuzin
- Miloš Kelemen
- Tomáš Jurčo
- Michal Krištof
- Marek Hrivík
- Peter Cehlárik
- Miloš Roman
- Samuel Takáč
- Marko Daňo
- Juraj Slafkovský
- Libor Hudáček
- Pavol Regenda
- Kristián Pospíšil
- Adrián Holešinský

=== Player statistics ===
Source"Reprezentační Rekordéri Podľa Počtu Štartov V Drese Slovenska". Hockey Slovakia (in Slovak). 6 February 2017.

As of 7 May 2023

Players in bold are still active. Note: Pos = Position; GP = Games Played; G = Goals; GPG = Goal per game;

Most caps
#	Player	GP	G
1.	**Dominik Graňák**	194	10
2.	Miroslav Šatan	183	86
3.	Martin Štrbák	162	13
4.	Ľubomír Sekeráš	152	29
5.	Peter Pucher	144	23
6.	**Tomáš Starosta**	144	6
7.	Ľubomír Višňovský	141	18
8.	Richard Kapuš	136	16
9.	Stanislav Jasečko	128	9
10.	Branko Radivojevič	124	21

Most goals
#	Player	GP	G	GPG
1.	Miroslav Šatan	183	86	.48
2.	Ľubomír Kolník	109	59	.54
3.	Jozef Daňo	117	45	.38
4.	Ján Pardavý	120	45	.38
5.	Vlastimil Plavucha	119	44	.37
6.	Marián Hossa	88	39	.44
7.	Žigmund Pálffy	74	37	.50
8.	Branislav Jánoš	117	37	.32
9.	Ladislav Nagy	122	37	.30
10.	Peter Bondra	47	35	.74

=== Head coaches ===
This table shows all Slovakia national team head coaches and their record at the IIHF World Championships, World Cup of Hockey and Winter Olympic Games (including qualifying tournaments). Data correct as of matches played on 19 May 2025.

Name	Years	G	W	OW	T	OL	L	GF	GA	W%	PPG
Július Šupler	1993–1996	29	16	0	5	1	7	160	92	55.2	1.31
Jozef Golonka	1996–1997	8	3	0	1	0	4	20	23	37.5	0.88
Ján Šterbák	1997–1999	16	5	0	4	0	7	44	46	31.3	0.88
Ján Filc	1999–2002	29	16	1	3	0	9	106	75	58.6	1.24
František Hossa	2002–2006	38	24	0	5	1	8	133	68	63.2	1.39
Ján Filc (Note: Managed the team during 2004 World Cup of Hockey)	2004	4	0	0	0	0	4	4	18	.000	0.00
Július Šupler	2006–2008	12	5	1	–	0	6	42	35	50.0	1.42
Ján Filc	2008–2010	13	4	2	–	2	5	34	42	46.2	1.38
Glen Hanlon	2010–2011	12	4	0	–	0	8	29	34	33.3	1.00
Vladimír Vůjtek	2011–2015	36	14	2	–	5	15	94	99	44.4	1.42
Zdeno Cíger	2015–2017	14	2	2	–	2	8	27	51	28.6	0.86
Craig Ramsay	2017–2024	59	27	3	–	6	23	169	165	50.8	1.58
Vladimír Országh	2025–	6	2	0	–	1	3	8	22	33.3	1.17

=== Team managers ===
Paul Loicq Award recipient Juraj Okoličány managed the team from 1993 to 1998.

=== Retired numbers ===
- **38** – **Pavol Demitra** A star of the national team and victim of the 2011 Lokomotiv Yaroslavl plane crash – retired from the national team at the Slovak-hosted World Championship that year.

== All-time record ==
The following table shows Slovakia's international record against other national teams from 1940 to 1945 and since 1993, correct as of 16 April 2026 after a match against Switzerland. Teams in italics are no longer actively competing. Overtime and game winning shot victories and losses are counted towards wins and losses.

Opponent	Played	Won	Drawn	Lost	GF	GA	GD
Austria	46	35	2	9	178	82	+96
Belarus	37	24	1	12	107	72	+35
Bulgaria	1	1	0	0	20	0	+20
Canada	53	20	4	29	148	171	−23
Croatia	1	1	0	0	6	1	+5
Czech Republic	77	16	7	54	151	267	−116
Denmark	24	17	0	7	93	50	+43
Finland	41	8	3	30	68	132	−65
France	38	30	3	5	167	68	+99
Germany	89	51	2	36	240	211	+29
Great Britain	5	5	0	0	29	7	+22
Hungary	9	7	0	2	57	22	+35
Italy	19	15	1	3	80	44	+36
Japan	5	5	0	0	39	12	+27
Kazakhstan	13	10	1	2	58	25	+33
Latvia	40	26	2	12	129	83	+46
Netherlands	2	2	0	0	24	4	+20
Norway	38	29	2	7	150	70	+80
Poland	9	8	1	0	51	12	+39
Protectorate of Bohemia and Moravia	1	0	0	1	0	12	−12
Romania	7	5	1	1	53	7	+46
Russia	34	9	5	20	72	108	−36
Slovenia	13	11	0	2	46	19	+27
South Korea	1	1	0	0	2	1	+1
Sweden	44	11	3	30	94	150	−56
Switzerland	82	35	7	40	206	192	+14
Ukraine	10	9	1	0	49	18	+31
United States	33	11	3	19	77	118	−41
Yugoslavia	1	1	0	0	4	1	+3
Total	773	403	49	321	2 395	1 959	+436

== Uniform evolution ==
National team jerseys

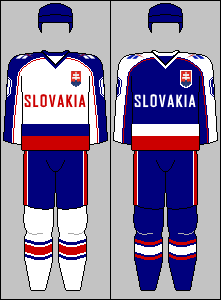
1994 Olympic jerseys

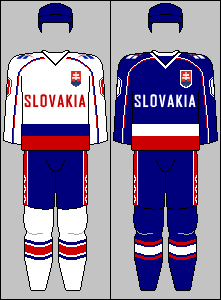
IIHF jerseys 1994

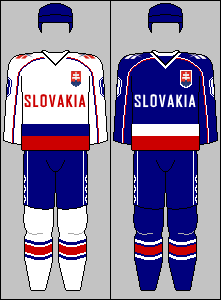
IIHF jerseys 1995

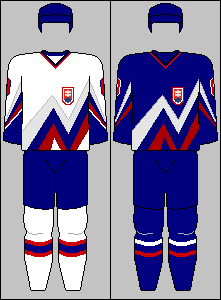
IIHF jerseys 1996, 1997

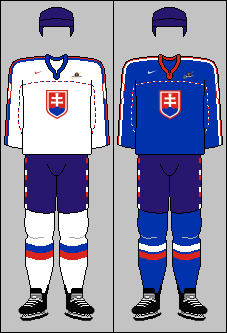
1998–2000 IIHF jerseys

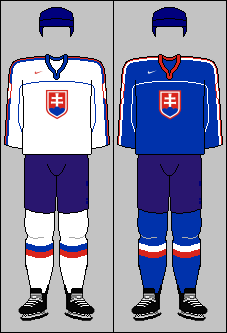
2002 Olympic jerseys, 2001–2004 IIHF jerseys

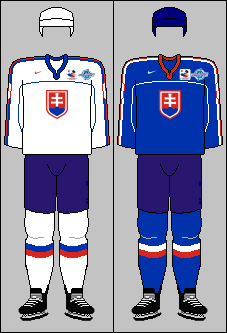
2004 WCH jerseys

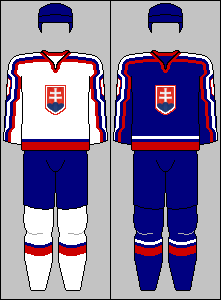
IIHF jerseys 2005

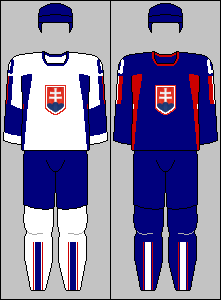
2006 Olympic jerseys, later used at IIHF tournaments 2006

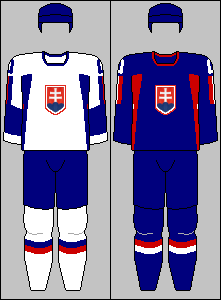
IIHF jerseys 2007, 2008

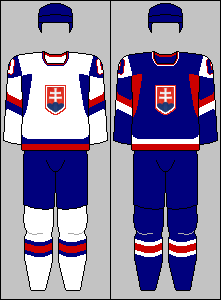
2010 Olympic jerseys, 2009–2013 IIHF jerseys

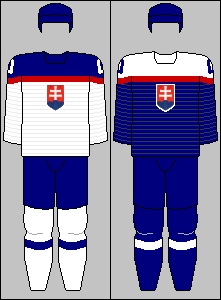
2014 Olympic jerseys, later used at IIHF tournaments 2014–2017

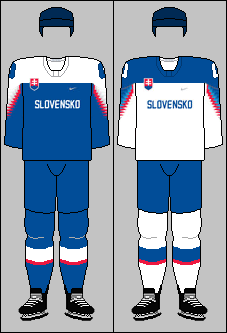
2018 Olympic jerseys

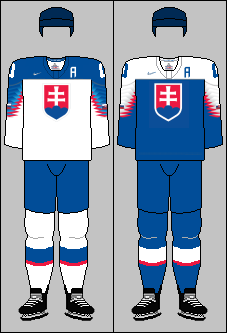
2018–2021 IIHF jerseys

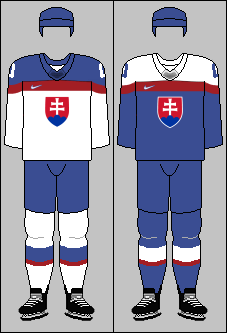
2022 Olympic jerseys

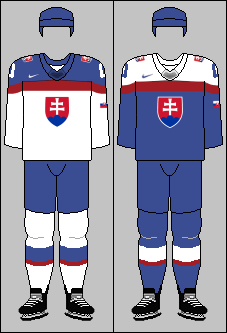
2022– IIHF jerseys

== See also ==
- List of players in Slovakia men's national ice hockey team
- Slovak Extraliga
