= Filip Mešár =

Slovak ice hockey player (born 2004)

- Born: 3 January 2004 (age 22) Spišská Belá, Slovakia
- Height: 5 ft 10 in (178 cm)
- Weight: 184 lb (83 kg; 13 st 2 lb)
- Position: Forward
- Shoots: Right
- NHL team (P) Cur. team Former teams: Montreal Canadiens; Laval Rocket (AHL); HK Poprad
- National team: Slovakia
- NHL draft: 26th overall, 2022; Montreal Canadiens
- Playing career: 2020–present

Filip Mešár (born 3 January 2004) is a Slovak professional ice hockey player who is a forward for the Laval Rocket of the American Hockey League (AHL) while under contract to the Montreal Canadiens of the National Hockey League (NHL). He was selected in the first round, 26th overall, by the Canadiens in the 2022 NHL entry draft.

== Playing career ==
=== Slovakia ===
Mešár began his professional career with HK Poprad, competing firstly with both their under-16 and under-18 tiers. He then moved up to the team's senior ranks in the Slovak Extraliga for the 2020–21 season. Being just 16 when he first entered the foregoing league, Mešár noted that some of his teammates had children his own age, sparking media attention when he scored a goal on his very first shift. He played 36 games in the regular season, and then participated in the team's deep run to the playoff finals, where they were ultimately defeated by HKM Zvolen.

Submitting his name for consideration in the 2021 CHL Import Draft, Mešár was selected ninth overall by the Kitchener Rangers of the Ontario Hockey League (OHL). However, he opted to remain in Slovakia for the following season, saying that he was "satisfied with the management of the club and the conditions I have here for my further advancement." Mešár would record eight goals and eight assists in 37 games played, and likewise manage three goals and an assist in six playoff games, before Poprad was eventually eliminated by HK Nitra in the first round.

=== North America ===
==== 2022 NHL entry draft ====
Prior to the 2022 NHL entry draft, Mešár was rated as a possible late first round selection or early candidate in the second round of proceedings. On 7 July 2022, the Montreal Canadiens selected Mešár 26th overall (using a pick previously acquired in trade from the Calgary Flames for Tyler Toffoli). The Canadiens had also selected his longtime friend and national teammate Juraj Slafkovský first overall, to both men's satisfaction. The foregoing draft proved an overall historic night for Slovak ice hockey as both Slafkovský and fellow countryman Šimon Nemec occupied the top two spots, whereas Mešár for his part rounded out the country's most selections during the course of the first round in any given draft year.

On 14 July, Mešár signed a three-year, entry-level contract with the Canadiens. Team general manager Kent Hughes suggested that Mešár's next step was undecided at that particular juncture, offering that he would likely play either at the major junior ranks in the OHL with Kitchener or professionally in the American Hockey League (AHL) with the Canadiens' top affiliate, the Laval Rocket.

==== Major junior ====
After participating in the Canadiens' preseason camp, Mešár was reassigned to Laval's training camp on 4 October 2022. He made his AHL debut on 14 October, playing on the fourth line in a 6–5 overtime loss to the Belleville Senators. The following day, it was announced that he was loaned to the Rangers. While Mešár had hoped to play with the Rocket for the remainder of the season, the Canadiens' development staff believed he would benefit more from playing at the top of the lineup in Kitchener. On arrival, he said that "I want to be a leader here. I want to get some points and help the team win." In his debut with the Rangers on 21 October, Mešár scored a goal and registered three assists in a 7–2 victory over the Sudbury Wolves. Collectively, Mešár finished the 2022–23 OHL season with 51 points in 52 games, helping his team advance to the second round of the 2023 OHL Playoffs following a first round upset of the top-seeded Windsor Spitfires. His production during the 2023–24 campaign essentially matched that of its predecessor whereas Mešár recorded 52 points across 45 game played.

==== Professional ====
In October 2024, Mešár was assigned to Laval to begin the 2024–25 AHL season, his first of professional rank in North America. After a strong start to his inaugural campaign with the Rocket, Mešár would suffer a lower-body injury after just five games played, sidelining him for a period of eight to ten weeks as a result. He subsequently returned to the team's lineup on 20 December. On 25 February 2025, it was announced that Mešár again was dealing with a lower-body injury and would miss upwards to six additional weeks of game action.

== International play ==
Medal record

Representing Slovakia

Men's ice hockey

Deutschland Cup
Silver medal – second place	2021 Germany	

Hlinka Gretzky Cup
Silver medal – second place	2021 Czech Republic/Slovakia	

Mešár made his international debut for Slovakia with the country's under-20 national team for the 2021 World Junior Championships, appearing in two games. He was then named to the under-18 national team for the annual Hlinka Gretzky Cup, recording two goals and six assists en route to winning a silver medal. In November 2021, Mešár made his senior national team debut as a teenager at that year's Deutschland Cup, capturing a silver medal.

Participating again in all of the 2022, 2023 and 2024 iterations of the World Juniors tournament, Mešár had a breakout performance at the latter, posting nine points in just five games played.

In May 2026, Mešár was named to the Slovakian roster ahead of the annual IIHF World Championship.

== Career statistics ==
=== Regular season and playoffs ===
			Regular season					Playoffs
Season	Team	League	GP	G	A	Pts	PIM	GP	G	A	Pts	PIM
2018–19	HK Poprad	Slovak-Jr.	1	0	0	0	0	—	—	—	—	—
2019–20	HK Poprad	Slovak-Jr.	33	13	28	41	8	—	—	—	—	—
2020–21	HK Poprad	Slovak	36	4	10	14	4	15	2	2	4	2
2021–22	HK Poprad	Slovak	37	8	8	16	8	6	3	1	4	0
2022–23	Laval Rocket	AHL	1	0	0	0	0	—	—	—	—	—
2022–23	Kitchener Rangers	OHL	52	17	34	51	8	9	1	3	4	0
2023–24	Laval Rocket	AHL	2	0	1	1	0	—	—	—	—	—
2023–24	Kitchener Rangers	OHL	45	19	33	52	12	10	1	15	16	6
2024–25	Laval Rocket	AHL	42	4	14	18	18	1	0	0	0	0
2025–26	Laval Rocket	AHL	71	9	18	27	26	—	—	—	—	—
AHL totals			116	13	33	46	44	1	0	0	0	0
Slovak totals			73	12	18	30	12	21	5	3	8	2

=== International ===
Year	Team	Event	Result	GP	G	A	Pts	PIM
2021	Slovakia	WJC	8th	2	0	0	0	0
2021	Slovakia	HG18	2nd place, silver medalist(s)	5	2	6	8	0
2021	Slovakia	DC	2nd place, silver medalist(s)	3	0	1	1	0
2022	Slovakia	WJC	9th	2	0	0	0	0
2023	Slovakia	WJC	6th	5	2	4	6	2
2024	Slovakia	WJC	6th	5	2	7	9	4
2026	Slovakia	WC	9th	7	1	2	3	2
Junior totals				19	6	17	23	6
Senior totals				10	1	3	4	2

Awards and achievements
Preceded by Juraj Slafkovský	Montreal Canadiens first-round draft pick 2022	Succeeded by David Reinbacher
