= SLAF =

SLAF may refer to

- The Sri Lanka Armed Forces, the combined military of the Democratic Socialist Republic of Sri Lanka
  - The Sri Lanka Air Force, a subset of the above.
- Juraj Slafkovský, a Slovakian ice hockey player
