= 2026 IIHF World Championship rosters =

Each team's roster consisted of at least 15 skaters (forwards and defencemen) and two goaltenders, and at most 22 skaters and three goaltenders. All 16 participating nations, through the confirmation of their respective national associations, had to submit a "Long List" no later than two weeks before the tournament, and a final roster by the Passport Control meeting prior to the start of the tournament.

Age and team as of 15 May 2026. Flags are only for foreign coaches.

== Group A ==
=== Austria ===
The roster was announced on 10 May 2026. Vinzenz Rohrer joined on 13 May 2026.

Head coach: (Switzerland) Roger Bader

| No. | Pos. | Name | Height | Weight | Birthdate | Team |
|---|---|---|---|---|---|---|
| 3 | F | Peter Schneider – C | 1.83 m (6 ft 0 in) | 91 kg (201 lb) | 4 April 1991 (aged 35) | (Austria) Red Bull Salzburg |
| 4 | D | Ramon Schnetzer | 1.78 m (5 ft 10 in) | 83 kg (183 lb) | 12 August 1996 (aged 29) | (Austria) Pioneers Vorarlberg |
| 5 | D | Dominic Hackl | 1.87 m (6 ft 2 in) | 91 kg (201 lb) | 8 November 1996 (aged 29) | (Austria) Vienna Capitals |
| 8 | F | Maximilian Rebernig | 1.93 m (6 ft 4 in) | 103 kg (227 lb) | 3 September 2000 (aged 25) | (Austria) EC VSV |
| 9 | F | Leon Wallner | 1.85 m (6 ft 1 in) | 89 kg (196 lb) | 1 July 2002 (aged 23) | (Austria) Vienna Capitals |
| 12 | D | David Maier | 1.87 m (6 ft 2 in) | 86 kg (190 lb) | 12 January 2000 (aged 26) | (Austria) EC KAC |
| 14 | F | Henrik Neubauer | 1.84 m (6 ft 0 in) | 90 kg (200 lb) | 15 April 1997 (aged 29) | (Austria) Steinbach Black Wings Linz |
| 16 | F | Dominic Zwerger | 1.83 m (6 ft 0 in) | 93 kg (205 lb) | 16 July 1996 (aged 29) | (Switzerland) HC Ambrì-Piotta |
| 17 | F | Ian Scherzer | 1.81 m (5 ft 11 in) | 89 kg (196 lb) | 3 July 2005 (aged 20) | (United States) RPI Engineers |
| 18 | D | Paul Stapelfeldt | 1.97 m (6 ft 6 in) | 100 kg (220 lb) | 20 September 1998 (aged 27) | (Austria) Graz 99ers |
| 19 | F | Vinzenz Rohrer | 1.78 m (5 ft 10 in) | 73 kg (161 lb) | 9 September 2004 (aged 21) | (Canada) Laval Rocket |
| 30 | G | David Kickert | 1.88 m (6 ft 2 in) | 83 kg (183 lb) | 16 March 1994 (aged 32) | (Austria) Red Bull Salzburg |
| 32 | D | Bernd Wolf – A | 1.78 m (5 ft 10 in) | 84 kg (185 lb) | 23 February 1997 (aged 29) | (Switzerland) EHC Kloten |
| 33 | G | Florian Vorauer | 1.88 m (6 ft 2 in) | 81 kg (179 lb) | 9 December 1999 (aged 26) | (Austria) EC KAC |
| 35 | G | Atte Tolvanen | 1.82 m (6 ft 0 in) | 87 kg (192 lb) | 23 November 1994 (aged 31) | (Austria) Red Bull Salzburg |
| 40 | F | Tim Harnisch | 1.79 m (5 ft 10 in) | 81 kg (179 lb) | 18 April 2001 (aged 25) | (Austria) Graz 99ers |
| 45 | D | Gregor Biber | 1.90 m (6 ft 3 in) | 89 kg (196 lb) | 9 August 2006 (aged 19) | (Sweden) Rögle BK |
| 48 | F | Lucas Thaler | 1.80 m (5 ft 11 in) | 80 kg (180 lb) | 21 January 2002 (aged 24) | (Austria) Red Bull Salzburg |
| 52 | F | Paul Huber | 1.93 m (6 ft 4 in) | 101 kg (223 lb) | 10 June 2000 (aged 25) | (Austria) Graz 99ers |
| 61 | F | Simeon Schwinger | 1.82 m (6 ft 0 in) | 75 kg (165 lb) | 7 October 1997 (aged 28) | (Austria) EC KAC |
| 70 | F | Benjamin Nissner | 1.82 m (6 ft 0 in) | 80 kg (180 lb) | 30 November 1997 (aged 28) | (Austria) Red Bull Salzburg |
| 78 | D | Thimo Nickl | 1.91 m (6 ft 3 in) | 87 kg (192 lb) | 4 December 2001 (aged 24) | (Austria) EC KAC |
| 81 | F | Leon Kolarik | 1.80 m (5 ft 11 in) | 80 kg (180 lb) | 23 September 2007 (aged 18) | (Canada) Peterborough Petes |
| 92 | D | Clemens Unterweger – A | 1.83 m (6 ft 0 in) | 91 kg (201 lb) | 1 April 1992 (aged 34) | (Austria) EC KAC |
| 96 | F | Mario Huber | 1.88 m (6 ft 2 in) | 90 kg (200 lb) | 8 August 1996 (aged 29) | (Austria) Red Bull Salzburg |

=== Finland ===
A 32-player roster was announced on 4 May 2026. The final squad was released on 10 May 2026.

Head coach: Antti Pennanen

| No. | Pos. | Name | Height | Weight | Birthdate | Team |
|---|---|---|---|---|---|---|
| 3 | D | Olli Määttä – A | 1.88 m (6 ft 2 in) | 94 kg (207 lb) | 22 August 1994 (aged 31) | (Canada) Calgary Flames |
| 4 | D | Mikko Lehtonen – A | 1.83 m (6 ft 0 in) | 86 kg (190 lb) | 16 January 1994 (aged 32) | (Switzerland) ZSC Lions |
| 10 | D | Henri Jokiharju | 1.83 m (6 ft 0 in) | 91 kg (201 lb) | 17 June 1999 (aged 26) | (United States) Boston Bruins |
| 13 | F | Jesse Puljujärvi | 1.92 m (6 ft 4 in) | 98 kg (216 lb) | 7 May 1998 (aged 28) | (Switzerland) Genève-Servette Hockey Club |
| 15 | F | Anton Lundell | 1.86 m (6 ft 1 in) | 89 kg (196 lb) | 3 October 2001 (aged 24) | (United States) Florida Panthers |
| 16 | F | Aleksander Barkov – C | 1.92 m (6 ft 4 in) | 97 kg (214 lb) | 2 September 1995 (aged 30) | (United States) Florida Panthers |
| 18 | D | Vili Saarijärvi | 1.78 m (5 ft 10 in) | 82 kg (181 lb) | 15 May 1997 (aged 29) | (Switzerland) Genève-Servette Hockey Club |
| 19 | F | Waltteri Merelä | 1.90 m (6 ft 3 in) | 95 kg (209 lb) | 6 July 1998 (aged 27) | (Switzerland) SC Bern |
| 21 | F | Patrik Puistola | 1.83 m (6 ft 0 in) | 82 kg (181 lb) | 11 January 2001 (aged 25) | (Sweden) Örebro HK |
| 23 | F | Sami Päivärinta | 1.75 m (5 ft 9 in) | 83 kg (183 lb) | 8 June 2003 (aged 22) | (Finland) HPK |
| 24 | F | Hannes Björninen | 1.85 m (6 ft 1 in) | 91 kg (201 lb) | 19 October 1995 (aged 30) | (Switzerland) SCL Tigers |
| 27 | F | Janne Kuokkanen | 1.85 m (6 ft 1 in) | 88 kg (194 lb) | 25 May 1998 (aged 27) | (Sweden) Malmö Redhawks |
| 29 | G | Harri Säteri | 1.86 m (6 ft 1 in) | 92 kg (203 lb) | 29 December 1989 (aged 36) | (Switzerland) EHC Biel |
| 31 | G | Justus Annunen | 1.93 m (6 ft 4 in) | 95 kg (209 lb) | 11 March 2000 (aged 26) | (United States) Nashville Predators |
| 33 | D | Nikolas Matinpalo | 1.90 m (6 ft 3 in) | 94 kg (207 lb) | 5 October 1998 (aged 27) | (Canada) Ottawa Senators |
| 34 | F | Aatu Räty | 1.88 m (6 ft 2 in) | 90 kg (200 lb) | 14 November 2002 (aged 23) | (Canada) Vancouver Canucks |
| 37 | F | Eemil Erholtz | 1.81 m (5 ft 11 in) | 86 kg (190 lb) | 25 March 2000 (aged 26) | (Finland) Oulun Kärpät |
| 41 | D | Ville Heinola | 1.82 m (6 ft 0 in) | 82 kg (181 lb) | 2 March 2001 (aged 25) | (Canada) Winnipeg Jets |
| 55 | D | Mikael Seppälä | 1.87 m (6 ft 2 in) | 96 kg (212 lb) | 8 March 1994 (aged 32) | (Czech Republic) HC Sparta Praha |
| 58 | D | Urho Vaakanainen | 1.88 m (6 ft 2 in) | 93 kg (205 lb) | 1 January 1999 (aged 27) | (United States) New York Rangers |
| 64 | F | Mikael Granlund – A | 1.79 m (5 ft 10 in) | 84 kg (185 lb) | 26 February 1992 (aged 34) | (United States) Anaheim Ducks |
| 65 | F | Sakari Manninen | 1.72 m (5 ft 8 in) | 80 kg (180 lb) | 10 February 1992 (aged 34) | (Switzerland) Genève-Servette Hockey Club |
| 70 | G | Joonas Korpisalo | 1.93 m (6 ft 4 in) | 91 kg (201 lb) | 28 April 1994 (aged 32) | (United States) Boston Bruins |
| 80 | F | Saku Mäenalanen | 1.92 m (6 ft 4 in) | 96 kg (212 lb) | 29 May 1994 (aged 31) | (Switzerland) SCL Tigers |
| 86 | F | Teuvo Teräväinen | 1.80 m (5 ft 11 in) | 86 kg (190 lb) | 11 September 1994 (aged 31) | (United States) Chicago Blackhawks |
| 92 | F | Lenni Hämeenaho | 1.85 m (6 ft 1 in) | 90 kg (200 lb) | 7 November 2004 (aged 21) | (United States) New Jersey Devils |
| 94 | F | Konsta Helenius | 1.81 m (5 ft 11 in) | 84 kg (185 lb) | 11 May 2006 (aged 20) | (United States) Buffalo Sabres |

=== Germany ===
A 28-player roster was announced on 6 May 2026. The final roster was announced on 11 May 2026. On 14 May 2026, Lukas Reichel replaced Dominik Bokk.

Head coach: Harold Kreis

| No. | Pos. | Name | Height | Weight | Birthdate | Team |
|---|---|---|---|---|---|---|
| 1 | G | Jonas Stettmer | 1.96 m (6 ft 5 in) | 101 kg (223 lb) | 9 October 2001 (aged 24) | (Germany) ERC Ingolstadt |
| 6 | D | Kai Wissmann – A | 1.90 m (6 ft 3 in) | 88 kg (194 lb) | 22 October 1996 (aged 29) | (Germany) Eisbären Berlin |
| 7 | F | Maximilian Kastner | 1.80 m (5 ft 11 in) | 84 kg (185 lb) | 3 January 1993 (aged 33) | (Germany) EHC Red Bull München |
| 9 | D | Leon Gawanke | 1.86 m (6 ft 1 in) | 90 kg (200 lb) | 31 May 1999 (aged 26) | (Germany) Adler Mannheim |
| 12 | D | Eric Mik | 1.82 m (6 ft 0 in) | 83 kg (183 lb) | 28 February 2000 (aged 26) | (Germany) Eisbären Berlin |
| 15 | F | Stefan Loibl | 1.86 m (6 ft 1 in) | 83 kg (183 lb) | 24 June 1996 (aged 29) | (Germany) Straubing Tigers |
| 21 | F | Nico Krämmer | 1.86 m (6 ft 1 in) | 89 kg (196 lb) | 23 October 1992 (aged 33) | (Germany) Fischtown Pinguins |
| 25 | D | Leon Hüttl | 1.82 m (6 ft 0 in) | 80 kg (180 lb) | 21 September 2000 (aged 25) | (Germany) ERC Ingolstadt |
| 30 | G | Philipp Grubauer | 1.85 m (6 ft 1 in) | 84 kg (185 lb) | 25 November 1991 (aged 34) | (United States) Seattle Kraken |
| 37 | G | Maximilian Franzreb | 1.83 m (6 ft 0 in) | 98 kg (216 lb) | 18 August 1996 (aged 29) | (Germany) Adler Mannheim |
| 38 | D | Fabio Wagner | 1.82 m (6 ft 0 in) | 83 kg (183 lb) | 17 September 1995 (aged 30) | (Germany) EHC Red Bull München |
| 40 | F | Alexander Ehl | 1.75 m (5 ft 9 in) | 76 kg (168 lb) | 28 November 1999 (aged 26) | (Germany) Adler Mannheim |
| 43 | F | Andreas Eder | 1.89 m (6 ft 2 in) | 91 kg (201 lb) | 20 March 1996 (aged 30) | (Germany) EHC Red Bull München |
| 44 | F | Josh Samanski | 1.90 m (6 ft 3 in) | 91 kg (201 lb) | 22 March 2002 (aged 24) | (Canada) Edmonton Oilers |
| 47 | F | Alexander Karachun | 1.88 m (6 ft 2 in) | 92 kg (203 lb) | 3 March 1995 (aged 31) | (Germany) Schwenninger Wild Wings |
| 48 | D | Phillip Sinn | 1.88 m (6 ft 2 in) | 87 kg (192 lb) | 13 January 2004 (aged 22) | (Germany) EHC Red Bull München |
| 53 | D | Moritz Seider – C | 1.92 m (6 ft 4 in) | 90 kg (200 lb) | 6 April 2001 (aged 25) | (United States) Detroit Red Wings |
| 56 | F | Manuel Wiederer | 1.83 m (6 ft 0 in) | 82 kg (181 lb) | 21 November 1996 (aged 29) | (Germany) Eisbären Berlin |
| 62 | F | Parker Tuomie | 1.76 m (5 ft 9 in) | 77 kg (170 lb) | 31 October 1995 (aged 30) | (Germany) Fischtown Pinguins |
| 64 | D | Marcus Weber | 1.88 m (6 ft 2 in) | 82 kg (181 lb) | 2 November 1992 (aged 33) | (Germany) Nürnberg Ice Tigers |
| 65 | F | Marc Michaelis | 1.77 m (5 ft 10 in) | 79 kg (174 lb) | 31 July 1995 (aged 30) | (Germany) Adler Mannheim |
| 71 | F | Daniel Fischbuch | 1.80 m (5 ft 11 in) | 80 kg (180 lb) | 19 August 1993 (aged 32) | (Germany) Kölner Haie |
| 72 | F | Dominik Kahun | 1.80 m (5 ft 11 in) | 79 kg (174 lb) | 2 July 1995 (aged 30) | (Switzerland) Lausanne HC |
| 73 | F | Lukas Reichel | 1.83 m (6 ft 0 in) | 78 kg (172 lb) | 17 May 2002 (aged 23) | (United States) Boston Bruins |
| 75 | F | Samuel Dove-McFalls | 1.88 m (6 ft 2 in) | 94 kg (207 lb) | 10 April 1997 (aged 29) | (Germany) Nürnberg Ice Tigers |
| 95 | F | Frederik Tiffels – A | 1.83 m (6 ft 0 in) | 87 kg (192 lb) | 20 May 1995 (aged 30) | (Germany) Eisbären Berlin |

=== Great Britain ===
A 27-player roster was announced on 25 March 2026. Sam Lyne joined on 13 May 2026.

Head coach: Peter Russell

| No. | Pos. | Name | Height | Weight | Birthdate | Team |
|---|---|---|---|---|---|---|
| 3 | D | Liam Steele | 1.93 m (6 ft 4 in) | 102 kg (225 lb) | 21 April 2004 (aged 22) | (United Kingdom) Sheffield Steeldogs |
| 5 | F | Ben Davies | 1.73 m (5 ft 8 in) | 81 kg (179 lb) | 18 January 1991 (aged 35) | (United Kingdom) Cardiff Devils |
| 7 | F | Robert Lachowicz | 1.78 m (5 ft 10 in) | 80 kg (180 lb) | 8 February 1990 (aged 36) | (United Kingdom) Glasgow Clan |
| 8 | D | Bradley Jenion | 1.95 m (6 ft 5 in) | 100 kg (220 lb) | 24 January 1998 (aged 28) | (United Kingdom) Manchester Storm |
| 9 | F | Brett Perlini | 1.88 m (6 ft 2 in) | 91 kg (201 lb) | 14 June 1990 (aged 35) | (United Kingdom) Cardiff Devils |
| 14 | F | Liam Kirk – A | 1.82 m (6 ft 0 in) | 72 kg (159 lb) | 3 January 2000 (aged 26) | (Germany) Eisbären Berlin |
| 15 | F | Jack Hopkins | 1.81 m (5 ft 11 in) | 78 kg (172 lb) | 8 May 2004 (aged 22) | (United Kingdom) Coventry Blaze |
| 17 | D | Mark Richardson – A | 1.83 m (6 ft 0 in) | 88 kg (194 lb) | 3 October 1986 (aged 39) | (United Kingdom) Cardiff Devils |
| 18 | F | Sam Lyne | 1.88 m (6 ft 2 in) | 93 kg (205 lb) | 7 April 2005 (aged 21) | (Canada) Cranbrook Bucks |
| 20 | G | Mat Robson | 1.91 m (6 ft 3 in) | 86 kg (190 lb) | 26 March 1996 (aged 30) | (United Kingdom) Coventry Blaze |
| 24 | D | Josh Tetlow | 1.98 m (6 ft 6 in) | 103 kg (227 lb) | 12 January 1998 (aged 28) | (United Kingdom) Nottingham Panthers |
| 27 | F | Cole Shudra | 1.88 m (6 ft 2 in) | 95 kg (209 lb) | 11 August 1998 (aged 27) | (United Kingdom) Sheffield Steelers |
| 33 | G | Ben Bowns | 1.83 m (6 ft 0 in) | 81 kg (179 lb) | 21 January 1991 (aged 35) | (United Kingdom) Cardiff Devils |
| 35 | G | Lucas Brine | 1.85 m (6 ft 1 in) | 77 kg (170 lb) | 9 August 2002 (aged 23) | (United Kingdom) Glasgow Clan |
| 48 | F | Johnny Curran | 1.78 m (5 ft 10 in) | 79 kg (174 lb) | 14 March 1995 (aged 31) | (United Kingdom) Dundee Stars |
| 58 | D | David Clements | 1.85 m (6 ft 1 in) | 84 kg (185 lb) | 20 September 1994 (aged 31) | (United Kingdom) Coventry Blaze |
| 61 | F | Logan Neilson | 1.95 m (6 ft 5 in) | 90 kg (200 lb) | 29 January 2003 (aged 23) | (United Kingdom) Fife Flyers |
| 73 | D | Joseph Hazeldine | 1.85 m (6 ft 1 in) | 80 kg (180 lb) | 7 March 2001 (aged 25) | (United Kingdom) Glasgow Clan |
| 74 | F | Ollie Betteridge | 1.80 m (5 ft 11 in) | 80 kg (180 lb) | 16 January 1996 (aged 30) | (United Kingdom) Nottingham Panthers |
| 75 | F | Robert Dowd – C | 1.78 m (5 ft 10 in) | 80 kg (180 lb) | 26 May 1988 (aged 37) | (United Kingdom) Sheffield Steelers |
| 77 | F | Bayley Harewood | 1.83 m (6 ft 0 in) | 77 kg (170 lb) | 7 July 2003 (aged 22) | (United Kingdom) Cardiff Devils |
| 79 | D | Nathanael Halbert | 1.83 m (6 ft 0 in) | 88 kg (194 lb) | 30 September 1995 (aged 30) | (Slovenia) HK Olimpija |
| 84 | D | Travis Brown | 1.88 m (6 ft 2 in) | 89 kg (196 lb) | 15 March 1994 (aged 32) | (United Kingdom) Guildford Flames |
| 92 | F | Joshua Waller | 1.78 m (5 ft 10 in) | 73 kg (161 lb) | 2 June 1999 (aged 26) | (United Kingdom) Guildford Flames |
| 94 | F | Cade Neilson | 1.83 m (6 ft 0 in) | 88 kg (194 lb) | 15 May 2001 (aged 25) | (United Kingdom) Glasgow Clan |

=== Hungary ===
A 29-player roster was announced on 3 May 2026. The final squad was released on 8 May 2026.

Head coach: Gergely Majoross

| No. | Pos. | Name | Height | Weight | Birthdate | Team |
|---|---|---|---|---|---|---|
| 1 | G | Bence Bálizs | 1.93 m (6 ft 4 in) | 95 kg (209 lb) | 30 May 1993 (aged 32) | (Hungary) Ferencvárosi TC |
| 2 | D | Márkó Csollák | 1.90 m (6 ft 3 in) | 80 kg (180 lb) | 22 August 2002 (aged 23) | (Hungary) DVTK Jegesmedvék |
| 5 | F | Domán Szongoth | 1.86 m (6 ft 1 in) | 90 kg (200 lb) | 8 June 2008 (aged 17) | (Finland) KooKoo |
| 11 | F | Bence Horváth | 1.82 m (6 ft 0 in) | 85 kg (187 lb) | 22 February 2004 (aged 22) | (Finland) Mikkelin Jukurit |
| 12 | D | Bence Stipsicz | 1.86 m (6 ft 1 in) | 86 kg (190 lb) | 3 February 1997 (aged 29) | (Hungary) Fehérvár AV19 |
| 13 | F | Krisztián Nagy | 1.80 m (5 ft 11 in) | 87 kg (192 lb) | 28 July 1994 (aged 31) | (Hungary) Ferencvárosi TC |
| 16 | F | János Hári | 1.75 m (5 ft 9 in) | 77 kg (170 lb) | 3 May 1992 (aged 34) | (Hungary) Fehérvár AV19 |
| 17 | D | Roland Kiss | 1.83 m (6 ft 0 in) | 81 kg (179 lb) | 17 April 1999 (aged 27) | (Hungary) Fehérvár AV19 |
| 20 | F | István Sofron – A | 1.89 m (6 ft 2 in) | 91 kg (201 lb) | 24 February 1988 (aged 38) | (Hungary) Ferencvárosi TC |
| 21 | F | Kristóf Papp | 1.79 m (5 ft 10 in) | 80 kg (180 lb) | 27 January 2001 (aged 25) | (United States) Norfolk Admirals |
| 22 | F | Vilmos Galló | 1.82 m (6 ft 0 in) | 86 kg (190 lb) | 31 July 1996 (aged 29) | (Finland) KooKoo |
| 23 | D | Zétény Hadobás | 1.87 m (6 ft 2 in) | 85 kg (187 lb) | 2 March 2003 (aged 23) | (Hungary) Ferencvárosi TC |
| 25 | D | Gabor Tornyai | 1.86 m (6 ft 1 in) | 96 kg (212 lb) | 6 October 1998 (aged 27) | (Hungary) Újpesti TE |
| 28 | F | István Bartalis | 1.86 m (6 ft 1 in) | 88 kg (194 lb) | 7 September 1990 (aged 35) | (Hungary) Fehérvár AV19 |
| 30 | G | Ádám Vay | 1.96 m (6 ft 5 in) | 103 kg (227 lb) | 22 March 1994 (aged 32) | (Czech Republic) Piráti Chomutov |
| 33 | D | Milán Horváth | 1.86 m (6 ft 1 in) | 93 kg (205 lb) | 2 February 2001 (aged 25) | (Hungary) Ferencvárosi TC |
| 34 | F | István Terbócs – A | 1.83 m (6 ft 0 in) | 92 kg (203 lb) | 28 June 1996 (aged 29) | (Hungary) Fehérvár AV19 |
| 36 | F | Csanád Erdély – C | 1.88 m (6 ft 2 in) | 86 kg (190 lb) | 5 April 1996 (aged 30) | (Hungary) Fehérvár AV19 |
| 42 | F | Márton Nemes | 1.86 m (6 ft 1 in) | 83 kg (183 lb) | 23 October 2005 (aged 20) | (United States) Bentley Falcons |
| 45 | F | Csanád Ravasz | 1.85 m (6 ft 1 in) | 80 kg (180 lb) | 5 March 2005 (aged 21) | (Romania) Gyergyói HK |
| 55 | D | Tamás Ortenszky | 1.87 m (6 ft 2 in) | 91 kg (201 lb) | 5 January 2002 (aged 24) | (Switzerland) EHC Winterthur |
| 61 | F | Péter Vincze | 1.80 m (5 ft 11 in) | 85 kg (187 lb) | 16 February 1995 (aged 31) | (Romania) Gyergyói HK |
| 70 | D | Zsombor Garát | 1.85 m (6 ft 1 in) | 90 kg (200 lb) | 27 July 1997 (aged 28) | (England) Nottingham Panthers |
| 76 | G | Levente Hegedüs | 1.88 m (6 ft 2 in) | 80 kg (180 lb) | 19 February 2004 (aged 22) | (Hungary) Fehérvár Hockey Academy 19 |
| 86 | F | Balázs Sebők | 1.85 m (6 ft 1 in) | 90 kg (200 lb) | 14 December 1994 (aged 31) | (Finland) HC Ässät Pori |
| 88 | F | Tamás Sárpátki | 1.92 m (6 ft 4 in) | 81 kg (179 lb) | 28 December 1994 (aged 31) | (Romania) Gyergyói HK |

=== Latvia ===
A 28-player roster was announced on 7 May 2026. The final squad was revealed on 12 May 2026.

Head coach: Harijs Vītoliņš

| No. | Pos. | Name | Height | Weight | Birthdate | Team |
|---|---|---|---|---|---|---|
| 3 | D | Alberts Šmits | 1.91 m (6 ft 3 in) | 93 kg (205 lb) | 2 December 2007 (aged 18) | (Finland) Mikkelin Jukurit |
| 4 | D | Kristofers Bindulis | 1.90 m (6 ft 3 in) | 86 kg (190 lb) | 18 September 1995 (aged 30) | (Slovakia) HK Dukla Michalovce |
| 5 | D | Artūrs Andžāns | 1.90 m (6 ft 3 in) | 90 kg (200 lb) | 21 August 2001 (aged 24) | (Finland) HPK |
| 9 | F | Renārs Krastenbergs | 1.83 m (6 ft 0 in) | 84 kg (185 lb) | 26 December 1998 (aged 27) | (Czech Republic) HC Olomouc |
| 12 | F | Gļebs Prohorenkovs | 1.86 m (6 ft 1 in) | 80 kg (180 lb) | 12 November 2001 (aged 24) | (United States) Niagara Purple Eagles |
| 14 | F | Olivers Mūrnieks | 1.86 m (6 ft 1 in) | 90 kg (200 lb) | 31 July 2008 (aged 17) | (Canada) Saint John Sea Dogs |
| 17 | F | Mārtiņš Dzierkals | 1.83 m (6 ft 0 in) | 84 kg (185 lb) | 4 April 1997 (aged 29) | (Czech Republic) HC Sparta Praha |
| 21 | F | Rūdolfs Balcers – C | 1.80 m (5 ft 11 in) | 79 kg (174 lb) | 8 April 1997 (aged 29) | (Switzerland) ZSC Lions |
| 22 | F | Toms Andersons | 1.85 m (6 ft 1 in) | 86 kg (190 lb) | 25 November 1993 (aged 32) | (Switzerland) HC La Chaux-de-Fonds |
| 23 | F | Sandis Vilmanis | 1.85 m (6 ft 1 in) | 87 kg (192 lb) | 23 January 2004 (aged 22) | (United States) Florida Panthers |
| 27 | D | Oskars Cibuļskis | 1.88 m (6 ft 2 in) | 96 kg (212 lb) | 9 April 1988 (aged 38) | (Denmark) Herning Blue Fox |
| 29 | D | Ralfs Freibergs – A | 1.81 m (5 ft 11 in) | 84 kg (185 lb) | 17 May 1991 (aged 34) | (Czech Republic) Mountfield HK |
| 34 | F | Eduards Tralmaks | 1.91 m (6 ft 3 in) | 85 kg (187 lb) | 17 February 1997 (aged 29) | (United States) Grand Rapids Griffins |
| 37 | F | Oskars Lapinskis | 1.77 m (5 ft 10 in) | 75 kg (165 lb) | 3 May 2002 (aged 24) | (Switzerland) SCL Tigers |
| 40 | G | Mareks Mitens | 1.85 m (6 ft 1 in) | 80 kg (180 lb) | 29 January 1998 (aged 28) | (Slovakia) HC Banská Bystrica |
| 42 | D | Miks Tumānovs | 1.95 m (6 ft 5 in) | 83 kg (183 lb) | 7 August 2001 (aged 24) | (Finland) Jokerit |
| 50 | G | Kristers Gudļevskis | 1.92 m (6 ft 4 in) | 97 kg (214 lb) | 31 July 1992 (aged 33) | (Germany) Fischtown Pinguins |
| 55 | D | Roberts Mamčics | 1.96 m (6 ft 5 in) | 105 kg (231 lb) | 6 April 1995 (aged 31) | (Czech Republic) Energie Karlovy Vary |
| 73 | F | Deniss Smirnovs | 1.77 m (5 ft 10 in) | 80 kg (180 lb) | 7 March 1999 (aged 27) | (Switzerland) EHC Kloten |
| 77 | D | Kristaps Zīle – A | 1.85 m (6 ft 1 in) | 86 kg (190 lb) | 24 December 1997 (aged 28) | (Czech Republic) HC Bílí Tygři Liberec |
| 87 | F | Kristaps Skrastiņš | 1.78 m (5 ft 10 in) | 77 kg (170 lb) | 20 November 2001 (aged 24) | (United States) New Hampshire Wildcats |
| 88 | G | Gustavs Grigals | 1.88 m (6 ft 2 in) | 89 kg (196 lb) | 22 July 1998 (aged 27) | (Finland) SaiPa |
| 89 | F | Filips Buncis | 1.90 m (6 ft 3 in) | 93 kg (205 lb) | 12 June 1997 (aged 28) | (Denmark) Rungsted Ishockey Klub |
| 95 | F | Oskars Batņa | 1.95 m (6 ft 5 in) | 106 kg (234 lb) | 7 May 1995 (aged 31) | (Finland) Lahti Pelicans |
| 97 | F | Haralds Egle | 1.80 m (5 ft 11 in) | 95 kg (209 lb) | 11 May 1996 (aged 30) | (Czech Republic) Energie Karlovy Vary |

=== Switzerland ===
A 30-player roster was announced on 4 May 2026. The final squad was revealed on 12 May 2026.

Head coach: Jan Cadieux

| No. | Pos. | Name | Height | Weight | Birthdate | Team |
|---|---|---|---|---|---|---|
| 8 | F | Simon Knak | 1.86 m (6 ft 1 in) | 92 kg (203 lb) | 27 January 2002 (aged 24) | (Switzerland) HC Davos |
| 9 | F | Damien Riat | 1.83 m (6 ft 0 in) | 85 kg (187 lb) | 26 February 1997 (aged 29) | (Switzerland) Lausanne HC |
| 13 | F | Nico Hischier | 1.86 m (6 ft 1 in) | 91 kg (201 lb) | 4 January 1999 (aged 27) | (United States) New Jersey Devils |
| 14 | D | Dean Kukan | 1.87 m (6 ft 2 in) | 89 kg (196 lb) | 8 July 1993 (aged 32) | (Switzerland) ZSC Lions |
| 17 | F | Ken Jäger | 1.86 m (6 ft 1 in) | 83 kg (183 lb) | 30 May 1998 (aged 27) | (Switzerland) Lausanne HC |
| 18 | D | Sven Jung | 1.87 m (6 ft 2 in) | 88 kg (194 lb) | 5 January 1995 (aged 31) | (Switzerland) HC Davos |
| 20 | G | Reto Berra | 1.95 m (6 ft 5 in) | 100 kg (220 lb) | 3 January 1987 (aged 39) | (Switzerland) HC Fribourg-Gottéron |
| 22 | F | Nino Niederreiter – A | 1.88 m (6 ft 2 in) | 97 kg (214 lb) | 8 September 1992 (aged 33) | (Canada) Winnipeg Jets |
| 26 | G | Sandro Aeschlimann | 1.84 m (6 ft 0 in) | 84 kg (185 lb) | 26 December 1994 (aged 31) | (Switzerland) HC Davos |
| 28 | F | Timo Meier | 1.87 m (6 ft 2 in) | 100 kg (220 lb) | 8 October 1996 (aged 29) | (United States) New Jersey Devils |
| 38 | D | Lukas Frick | 1.88 m (6 ft 2 in) | 91 kg (201 lb) | 15 September 1994 (aged 31) | (Switzerland) HC Davos |
| 44 | F | Pius Suter | 1.80 m (5 ft 11 in) | 80 kg (180 lb) | 24 May 1996 (aged 29) | (United States) St. Louis Blues |
| 54 | D | Christian Marti | 1.90 m (6 ft 3 in) | 98 kg (216 lb) | 29 March 1993 (aged 33) | (Switzerland) ZSC Lions |
| 56 | D | Tim Berni | 1.83 m (6 ft 0 in) | 87 kg (192 lb) | 11 February 2000 (aged 26) | (Switzerland) Genève-Servette Hockey Club |
| 62 | F | Denis Malgin | 1.75 m (5 ft 9 in) | 81 kg (179 lb) | 18 January 1997 (aged 29) | (Switzerland) ZSC Lions |
| 63 | G | Leonardo Genoni | 1.83 m (6 ft 0 in) | 86 kg (190 lb) | 28 August 1987 (aged 38) | (Switzerland) EV Zug |
| 72 | D | Dominik Egli | 1.74 m (5 ft 9 in) | 81 kg (179 lb) | 20 August 1998 (aged 27) | (Sweden) Frölunda HC |
| 79 | F | Calvin Thürkauf | 1.87 m (6 ft 2 in) | 97 kg (214 lb) | 27 June 1997 (aged 28) | (Switzerland) HC Lugano |
| 80 | F | Nicolas Baechler | 1.88 m (6 ft 2 in) | 92 kg (203 lb) | 23 August 2003 (aged 22) | (Switzerland) ZSC Lions |
| 85 | F | Sven Andrighetto | 1.77 m (5 ft 10 in) | 84 kg (185 lb) | 21 March 1993 (aged 33) | (Switzerland) ZSC Lions |
| 86 | D | J. J. Moser – A | 1.88 m (6 ft 2 in) | 83 kg (183 lb) | 6 June 2000 (aged 25) | (United States) Tampa Bay Lightning |
| 88 | F | Christoph Bertschy | 1.77 m (5 ft 10 in) | 84 kg (185 lb) | 5 April 1994 (aged 32) | (Switzerland) HC Fribourg-Gottéron |
| 90 | D | Roman Josi – C | 1.87 m (6 ft 2 in) | 91 kg (201 lb) | 1 June 1990 (aged 35) | (United States) Nashville Predators |
| 93 | F | Théo Rochette | 1.80 m (5 ft 11 in) | 78 kg (172 lb) | 20 February 2002 (aged 24) | (Switzerland) Lausanne HC |
| 94 | F | Attilio Biasca | 1.86 m (6 ft 1 in) | 89 kg (196 lb) | 18 March 2003 (aged 23) | (Switzerland) HC Fribourg-Gottéron |

=== United States ===
The roster was announced on 7 May 2026.

Head coach: Don Granato

| No. | Pos. | Name | Height | Weight | Birthdate | Team |
|---|---|---|---|---|---|---|
| 1 | G | Devin Cooley | 1.95 m (6 ft 5 in) | 87 kg (192 lb) | 25 August 1997 (aged 28) | (Canada) Calgary Flames |
| 7 | D | Ryan Ufko | 1.78 m (5 ft 10 in) | 82 kg (181 lb) | 7 May 2003 (aged 23) | (United States) Nashville Predators |
| 9 | F | Ryan Leonard | 1.85 m (6 ft 1 in) | 93 kg (205 lb) | 21 January 2005 (aged 21) | (United States) Washington Capitals |
| 10 | F | James Hagens | 1.80 m (5 ft 11 in) | 80 kg (180 lb) | 3 November 2006 (aged 19) | (United States) Boston Bruins |
| 11 | F | Oliver Moore | 1.80 m (5 ft 11 in) | 85 kg (187 lb) | 22 January 2005 (aged 21) | (United States) Chicago Blackhawks |
| 15 | F | Tommy Novak | 1.85 m (6 ft 1 in) | 81 kg (179 lb) | 28 April 1997 (aged 29) | (United States) Pittsburgh Penguins |
| 16 | D | Mason Lohrei | 1.95 m (6 ft 5 in) | 100 kg (220 lb) | 17 January 2001 (aged 25) | (United States) Boston Bruins |
| 17 | D | Will Borgen | 1.91 m (6 ft 3 in) | 90 kg (200 lb) | 19 December 1996 (aged 29) | (United States) New York Rangers |
| 18 | F | Sam Lafferty | 1.88 m (6 ft 2 in) | 93 kg (205 lb) | 6 March 1995 (aged 31) | (United States) Chicago Blackhawks |
| 19 | F | Matthew Tkachuk | 1.88 m (6 ft 2 in) | 91 kg (201 lb) | 11 December 1997 (aged 28) | (United States) Florida Panthers |
| 21 | F | Alex Steeves | 1.83 m (6 ft 0 in) | 90 kg (200 lb) | 10 December 1999 (aged 26) | (United States) Boston Bruins |
| 22 | F | Isaac Howard | 1.78 m (5 ft 10 in) | 82 kg (181 lb) | 30 March 2004 (aged 22) | (Canada) Edmonton Oilers |
| 24 | F | Mathieu Olivier – A | 1.85 m (6 ft 1 in) | 105 kg (231 lb) | 11 February 1997 (aged 29) | (United States) Columbus Blue Jackets |
| 26 | F | Max Plante | 1.80 m (5 ft 11 in) | 82 kg (181 lb) | 20 February 2006 (aged 20) | (United States) Minnesota Duluth Bulldogs |
| 27 | F | Matt Coronato | 1.78 m (5 ft 10 in) | 83 kg (183 lb) | 14 November 2002 (aged 23) | (Canada) Calgary Flames |
| 33 | G | Drew Commesso | 1.88 m (6 ft 2 in) | 82 kg (181 lb) | 19 July 2002 (aged 23) | (United States) Chicago Blackhawks |
| 44 | D | Wyatt Kaiser | 1.83 m (6 ft 0 in) | 86 kg (190 lb) | 31 July 2002 (aged 23) | (United States) Chicago Blackhawks |
| 47 | F | Paul Cotter | 1.88 m (6 ft 2 in) | 97 kg (214 lb) | 16 November 1999 (aged 26) | (United States) New Jersey Devils |
| 55 | D | Ryan Lindgren – A | 1.83 m (6 ft 0 in) | 88 kg (194 lb) | 11 February 1998 (aged 28) | (United States) Seattle Kraken |
| 60 | G | Joseph Woll | 1.91 m (6 ft 3 in) | 96 kg (212 lb) | 12 July 1998 (aged 27) | (Canada) Toronto Maple Leafs |
| 63 | F | Max Sasson | 1.85 m (6 ft 1 in) | 82 kg (181 lb) | 5 September 2000 (aged 25) | (Canada) Vancouver Canucks |
| 67 | D | Declan Carlile | 1.91 m (6 ft 3 in) | 86 kg (190 lb) | 18 May 2000 (aged 25) | (United States) Tampa Bay Lightning |
| 72 | D | Justin Faulk – C | 1.83 m (6 ft 0 in) | 98 kg (216 lb) | 20 March 1992 (aged 34) | (United States) Detroit Red Wings |
| 75 | D | Connor Clifton | 1.83 m (6 ft 0 in) | 89 kg (196 lb) | 28 April 1995 (aged 31) | (United States) Pittsburgh Penguins |
| 82 | F | Danny Nelson | 1.91 m (6 ft 3 in) | 100 kg (220 lb) | 3 August 2005 (aged 20) | (United States) Notre Dame Fighting Irish |

== Group B ==
=== Canada ===
The roster was announced on 8 May 2026. Sidney Crosby replaced Mathew Barzal on 12 May 2026.

Head Coach: Misha Donskov

| No. | Pos. | Name | Height | Weight | Birthdate | Team |
|---|---|---|---|---|---|---|
| 2 | D | Dylan DeMelo | 1.85 m (6 ft 1 in) | 88 kg (194 lb) | 1 May 1993 (aged 33) | (Canada) Winnipeg Jets |
| 5 | D | Denton Mateychuk | 1.80 m (5 ft 11 in) | 87 kg (192 lb) | 12 July 2004 (aged 21) | (United States) Columbus Blue Jackets |
| 6 | D | Sam Dickinson | 1.90 m (6 ft 3 in) | 95 kg (209 lb) | 7 June 2006 (aged 19) | (United States) San Jose Sharks |
| 13 | F | Gabriel Vilardi | 1.91 m (6 ft 3 in) | 91 kg (201 lb) | 16 August 1999 (aged 26) | (Canada) Winnipeg Jets |
| 16 | F | Connor Brown | 1.83 m (6 ft 0 in) | 84 kg (185 lb) | 14 January 1994 (aged 32) | (United States) New Jersey Devils |
| 18 | F | Robert Thomas | 1.83 m (6 ft 0 in) | 99 kg (218 lb) | 2 July 1999 (aged 26) | (United States) St. Louis Blues |
| 19 | F | Dawson Mercer | 1.83 m (6 ft 0 in) | 83 kg (183 lb) | 27 October 2001 (aged 24) | (United States) New Jersey Devils |
| 22 | D | Evan Bouchard | 1.91 m (6 ft 3 in) | 87 kg (192 lb) | 20 October 1999 (aged 26) | (Canada) Edmonton Oilers |
| 24 | F | Dylan Cozens | 1.91 m (6 ft 3 in) | 85 kg (187 lb) | 9 February 2001 (aged 25) | (Canada) Ottawa Senators |
| 25 | D | Darnell Nurse | 1.93 m (6 ft 4 in) | 100 kg (220 lb) | 4 February 1995 (aged 31) | (Canada) Edmonton Oilers |
| 28 | D | Zach Whitecloud | 1.88 m (6 ft 2 in) | 99 kg (218 lb) | 28 November 1996 (aged 29) | (Canada) Calgary Flames |
| 29 | D | Parker Wotherspoon | 1.85 m (6 ft 1 in) | 88 kg (194 lb) | 24 August 1997 (aged 28) | (United States) Pittsburgh Penguins |
| 33 | G | Cam Talbot | 1.90 m (6 ft 3 in) | 82 kg (181 lb) | 5 July 1987 (aged 38) | (United States) Detroit Red Wings |
| 44 | D | Morgan Rielly | 1.85 m (6 ft 1 in) | 99 kg (218 lb) | 9 March 1994 (aged 32) | (Canada) Toronto Maple Leafs |
| 55 | F | Mark Scheifele | 1.90 m (6 ft 3 in) | 94 kg (207 lb) | 15 March 1993 (aged 33) | (Canada) Winnipeg Jets |
| 58 | F | Emmitt Finnie | 1.85 m (6 ft 1 in) | 88 kg (194 lb) | 27 June 2005 (aged 20) | (United States) Detroit Red Wings |
| 71 | F | Macklin Celebrini – C | 1.83 m (6 ft 0 in) | 86 kg (190 lb) | 13 June 2006 (aged 19) | (United States) San Jose Sharks |
| 72 | G | Jack Ivankovic | 1.83 m (6 ft 0 in) | 81 kg (179 lb) | 22 May 2007 (aged 18) | (United States) Michigan Wolverines |
| 73 | G | Jet Greaves | 1.83 m (6 ft 0 in) | 85 kg (187 lb) | 30 March 2001 (aged 25) | (United States) Columbus Blue Jackets |
| 81 | F | Dylan Holloway | 1.85 m (6 ft 1 in) | 91 kg (201 lb) | 23 September 2001 (aged 24) | (United States) St. Louis Blues |
| 87 | F | Sidney Crosby – A | 1.80 m (5 ft 11 in) | 85 kg (187 lb) | 7 August 1987 (aged 38) | (United States) Pittsburgh Penguins |
| 90 | F | Ryan O'Reilly – A | 1.85 m (6 ft 1 in) | 98 kg (216 lb) | 7 February 1991 (aged 35) | (United States) Nashville Predators |
| 91 | F | John Tavares – A | 1.85 m (6 ft 1 in) | 98 kg (216 lb) | 20 September 1990 (aged 35) | (Canada) Toronto Maple Leafs |
| 93 | F | Fraser Minten | 1.88 m (6 ft 2 in) | 87 kg (192 lb) | 5 July 2004 (aged 21) | (United States) Boston Bruins |
| 94 | F | Porter Martone | 1.91 m (6 ft 3 in) | 95 kg (209 lb) | 26 October 2006 (aged 19) | (United States) Philadelphia Flyers |

=== Czechia ===
The roster was announced on 10 May 2026.

Head coach: Radim Rulík

| No. | Pos. | Name | Height | Weight | Birthdate | Team |
|---|---|---|---|---|---|---|
| 6 | D | Michal Kempný | 1.83 m (6 ft 0 in) | 89 kg (196 lb) | 8 September 1990 (aged 35) | (Sweden) Brynäs IF |
| 8 | F | Ondřej Beránek | 1.84 m (6 ft 0 in) | 90 kg (200 lb) | 21 December 1995 (aged 30) | (Czech Republic) HC Energie Karlovy Vary |
| 10 | F | Roman Červenka – C | 1.81 m (5 ft 11 in) | 88 kg (194 lb) | 10 December 1985 (aged 40) | (Czech Republic) HC Dynamo Pardubice |
| 11 | F | Matyáš Melovský | 1.87 m (6 ft 2 in) | 90 kg (200 lb) | 25 May 2004 (aged 21) | (United States) Utica Comets |
| 12 | F | Jiří Černoch | 1.79 m (5 ft 10 in) | 93 kg (205 lb) | 1 September 1996 (aged 29) | (Czech Republic) HC Energie Karlovy Vary |
| 17 | D | Filip Hronek – A | 1.83 m (6 ft 0 in) | 85 kg (187 lb) | 2 November 1997 (aged 28) | (Canada) Vancouver Canucks |
| 18 | F | Dominik Kubalík | 1.87 m (6 ft 2 in) | 86 kg (190 lb) | 21 August 1995 (aged 30) | (Switzerland) EV Zug |
| 19 | F | Jakub Flek | 1.73 m (5 ft 8 in) | 78 kg (172 lb) | 24 December 1992 (aged 33) | (Czech Republic) HC Kometa Brno |
| 23 | F | Lukáš Sedlák – A | 1.84 m (6 ft 0 in) | 94 kg (207 lb) | 25 February 1993 (aged 33) | (Czech Republic) HC Dynamo Pardubice |
| 24 | D | Jan Ščotka | 1.87 m (6 ft 2 in) | 91 kg (201 lb) | 20 May 1996 (aged 29) | (Czech Republic) HC Kometa Brno |
| 26 | D | Jiří Ticháček | 1.75 m (5 ft 9 in) | 77 kg (170 lb) | 30 January 2003 (aged 23) | (Finland) Oulun Kärpät |
| 27 | D | Marek Alscher | 1.90 m (6 ft 3 in) | 93 kg (205 lb) | 7 April 2004 (aged 22) | (United States) Florida Panthers |
| 32 | G | Josef Kořenář | 1.86 m (6 ft 1 in) | 86 kg (190 lb) | 31 January 1998 (aged 28) | (Czech Republic) HC Sparta Praha |
| 39 | G | Dominik Pavlát | 1.87 m (6 ft 2 in) | 80 kg (180 lb) | 11 November 1999 (aged 26) | (Finland) Ilves |
| 49 | F | Jaroslav Chmelař | 1.93 m (6 ft 4 in) | 103 kg (227 lb) | 20 July 2003 (aged 22) | (United States) New York Rangers |
| 55 | D | Libor Hájek | 1.91 m (6 ft 3 in) | 95 kg (209 lb) | 4 February 1998 (aged 28) | (Czech Republic) HC Dynamo Pardubice |
| 60 | G | Petr Kváča | 1.86 m (6 ft 1 in) | 89 kg (196 lb) | 12 September 1997 (aged 28) | (Czech Republic) HC Bílí Tygři Liberec |
| 61 | F | Martin Kaut | 1.88 m (6 ft 2 in) | 86 kg (190 lb) | 2 October 1999 (aged 26) | (Czech Republic) HC Dynamo Pardubice |
| 65 | D | Tomáš Cibulka | 1.83 m (6 ft 0 in) | 77 kg (170 lb) | 2 April 2004 (aged 22) | (Czech Republic) Motor České Budějovice |
| 79 | D | Tomáš Galvas | 1.79 m (5 ft 10 in) | 76 kg (168 lb) | 11 February 2006 (aged 20) | (Czech Republic) HC Bílí Tygři Liberec |
| 81 | F | Matěj Blümel | 1.83 m (6 ft 0 in) | 93 kg (205 lb) | 31 May 2000 (aged 25) | (United States) Boston Bruins |
| 87 | F | Michal Kovařčík | 1.84 m (6 ft 0 in) | 80 kg (180 lb) | 19 November 1996 (aged 29) | (Czech Republic) HC Oceláři Třinec |
| 89 | F | Jan Mandát | 1.84 m (6 ft 0 in) | 88 kg (194 lb) | 18 November 1995 (aged 30) | (Czech Republic) HC Dynamo Pardubice |
| 95 | F | Daniel Voženílek | 1.90 m (6 ft 3 in) | 101 kg (223 lb) | 10 February 1996 (aged 30) | (Switzerland) EV Zug |
| 96 | F | David Tomášek | 1.88 m (6 ft 2 in) | 95 kg (209 lb) | 10 February 1996 (aged 30) | (Sweden) Färjestad BK |

=== Denmark ===
The roster was announced on 13 May 2026.

Head coach: Mikael Gath

| No. | Pos. | Name | Height | Weight | Birthdate | Team |
|---|---|---|---|---|---|---|
| 1 | G | Nicolaj Henriksen | 1.95 m (6 ft 5 in) | 92 kg (203 lb) | 25 September 1995 (aged 30) | (Denmark) Esbjerg Energy |
| 3 | D | Malte Setkov | 2.00 m (6 ft 7 in) | 93 kg (205 lb) | 14 January 1999 (aged 27) | (Denmark) Rødovre Mighty Bulls |
| 6 | F | Oliver Kjær | 1.83 m (6 ft 0 in) | 84 kg (185 lb) | 10 July 2000 (aged 25) | (Denmark) Esbjerg Energy |
| 9 | F | Frederik Storm | 1.80 m (5 ft 11 in) | 86 kg (190 lb) | 20 February 1989 (aged 37) | (Germany) Kölner Haie |
| 11 | F | Alexander True | 1.96 m (6 ft 5 in) | 91 kg (201 lb) | 17 July 1997 (aged 28) | (Finland) JYP Jyväskylä |
| 21 | D | Kasper Larsen | 1.97 m (6 ft 6 in) | 105 kg (231 lb) | 23 September 2002 (aged 23) | (Denmark) Herning Blue Fox |
| 22 | D | Markus Lauridsen | 1.86 m (6 ft 1 in) | 87 kg (192 lb) | 28 February 1991 (aged 35) | (Italy) HC Pustertal Wölfe |
| 29 | F | Mikkel Aagaard – A | 1.84 m (6 ft 0 in) | 81 kg (179 lb) | 18 October 1995 (aged 30) | (Sweden) Skellefteå AIK |
| 30 | G | Mads Søgaard | 2.00 m (6 ft 7 in) | 91 kg (201 lb) | 13 December 2000 (aged 25) | (Canada) Ottawa Senators |
| 33 | D | Morten Jensen | 1.83 m (6 ft 0 in) | 82 kg (181 lb) | 1 March 1997 (aged 29) | (Denmark) Rungsted Ishockey Klub |
| 35 | G | Kristers Steinbergs | 1.92 m (6 ft 4 in) | 90 kg (200 lb) | 23 March 2005 (aged 21) | (Sweden) Hudiksvalls HC |
| 36 | D | Daniel Baastrup | 1.80 m (5 ft 11 in) | 84 kg (185 lb) | 23 July 1999 (aged 26) | (Denmark) Odense Bulldogs |
| 38 | F | Morten Poulsen | 1.86 m (6 ft 1 in) | 95 kg (209 lb) | 9 September 1988 (aged 37) | (Denmark) Herning Blue Fox |
| 39 | F | Jacob Schmidt-Svejstrup | 1.88 m (6 ft 2 in) | 91 kg (201 lb) | 14 January 1998 (aged 28) | (Denmark) SønderjyskE Ishockey |
| 40 | D | Anders Koch | 1.88 m (6 ft 2 in) | 83 kg (183 lb) | 2 October 1997 (aged 28) | (Austria) Graz 99ers |
| 41 | D | Jesper Jensen Aabo – C | 1.83 m (6 ft 0 in) | 93 kg (205 lb) | 30 July 1991 (aged 34) | (Austria) EC KAC |
| 42 | D | Phillip Bruggisser | 1.83 m (6 ft 0 in) | 85 kg (187 lb) | 7 August 1991 (aged 34) | (Germany) Fischtown Pinguins |
| 54 | F | Felix Scheel | 1.83 m (6 ft 0 in) | 89 kg (196 lb) | 1 September 1992 (aged 33) | (Germany) Schwenninger Wild Wings |
| 63 | F | Patrick Russell – A | 1.86 m (6 ft 1 in) | 92 kg (203 lb) | 4 January 1993 (aged 33) | (Germany) Kölner Haie |
| 65 | F | Christian Wejse | 1.86 m (6 ft 1 in) | 88 kg (194 lb) | 4 December 1998 (aged 27) | (Germany) Fischtown Pinguins |
| 72 | F | Phillip Schultz | 1.83 m (6 ft 0 in) | 91 kg (201 lb) | 24 July 2000 (aged 25) | (Denmark) Esbjerg Energy |
| 77 | F | Mathias From | 1.86 m (6 ft 1 in) | 85 kg (187 lb) | 16 December 1997 (aged 28) | (Austria) EC KAC |
| 80 | G | Frederik Dichow | 1.95 m (6 ft 5 in) | 87 kg (192 lb) | 1 March 2001 (aged 25) | (Sweden) HV71 |
| 82 | F | David Madsen | 1.87 m (6 ft 2 in) | 90 kg (200 lb) | 25 January 1999 (aged 27) | (Sweden) Västerås IK |
| 86 | F | Joachim Blichfeld | 1.87 m (6 ft 2 in) | 82 kg (181 lb) | 17 July 1998 (aged 27) | (Finland) Tappara |
| 95 | F | Nick Olesen | 1.85 m (6 ft 1 in) | 84 kg (185 lb) | 14 November 1995 (aged 30) | (Czech Republic) Motor České Budějovice |

=== Italy ===
The roster was announced on 13 May 2026.

Head coach: (Finland) Jukka Jalonen

| No. | Pos. | Name | Height | Weight | Birthdate | Team |
|---|---|---|---|---|---|---|
| 7 | F | Alessandro Segafredo | 1.85 m (6 ft 1 in) | 85 kg (187 lb) | 15 September 2004 (aged 21) | (Switzerland) ZSC Lions |
| 9 | F | Daniel Mantenuto | 1.75 m (5 ft 9 in) | 77 kg (170 lb) | 18 October 1997 (aged 28) | (Italy) HC Bolzano |
| 10 | D | Peter Spornberger | 1.86 m (6 ft 1 in) | 94 kg (207 lb) | 6 January 1999 (aged 27) | (Germany) ERC Ingolstadt |
| 13 | F | Matt Bradley | 1.83 m (6 ft 0 in) | 93 kg (205 lb) | 22 January 1997 (aged 29) | (Italy) HC Bolzano |
| 17 | D | Carmine Buono | 1.88 m (6 ft 2 in) | 91 kg (201 lb) | 22 February 1997 (aged 29) | (Italy) HC Gherdëina |
| 18 | F | Nick Saracino | 1.84 m (6 ft 0 in) | 88 kg (194 lb) | 20 February 1992 (aged 34) | (Italy) HC Bolzano |
| 19 | F | Bryce Misley | 1.87 m (6 ft 2 in) | 91 kg (201 lb) | 5 September 1999 (aged 26) | (Italy) HC Bolzano |
| 20 | G | Damian Clara | 2.01 m (6 ft 7 in) | 97 kg (214 lb) | 13 January 2005 (aged 21) | (United States) San Diego Gulls |
| 22 | F | Matthias Mantinger | 1.82 m (6 ft 0 in) | 85 kg (187 lb) | 22 April 1996 (aged 30) | (Italy) HC Pustertal Wölfe |
| 30 | G | Jacob Smith | 1.80 m (5 ft 11 in) | 87 kg (192 lb) | 1 May 1995 (aged 31) | (France) Ducs d'Angers |
| 34 | F | Tommy Purdeller | 1.81 m (5 ft 11 in) | 88 kg (194 lb) | 13 April 2004 (aged 22) | (Italy) HC Pustertal Wölfe |
| 35 | G | Davide Fadani | 1.82 m (6 ft 0 in) | 78 kg (172 lb) | 3 February 2001 (aged 25) | (Switzerland) EHC Kloten |
| 36 | F | Cristiano DiGiacinto | 1.83 m (6 ft 0 in) | 88 kg (194 lb) | 10 January 1996 (aged 30) | (Italy) HC Bolzano |
| 37 | D | Phil Pietroniro – A | 1.85 m (6 ft 1 in) | 90 kg (200 lb) | 27 May 1994 (aged 31) | (Czech Republic) Rytíři Kladno |
| 44 | D | Gregorio Gios | 1.83 m (6 ft 0 in) | 92 kg (203 lb) | 29 June 1999 (aged 26) | (Italy) Asiago Hockey 1935 |
| 46 | F | Ivan Deluca | 1.93 m (6 ft 4 in) | 102 kg (225 lb) | 28 July 1997 (aged 28) | (Italy) HC Pustertal Wölfe |
| 49 | D | Gabriel Nitz | 1.90 m (6 ft 3 in) | 95 kg (209 lb) | 21 January 2007 (aged 19) | (Italy) Wipptal Broncos |
| 53 | D | Alex Trivellato – C | 1.89 m (6 ft 2 in) | 90 kg (200 lb) | 5 January 1993 (aged 33) | (Germany) Schwenninger Wild Wings |
| 55 | D | Luca Zanatta | 1.85 m (6 ft 1 in) | 90 kg (200 lb) | 15 May 1991 (aged 35) | (Italy) HC Pustertal Wölfe |
| 67 | F | Mikael Frycklund | 1.89 m (6 ft 2 in) | 102 kg (225 lb) | 4 May 1993 (aged 33) | (Italy) HC Pustertal Wölfe |
| 71 | F | Marco Zanetti | 1.75 m (5 ft 9 in) | 72 kg (159 lb) | 12 March 2002 (aged 24) | (Switzerland) HC Lugano |
| 73 | F | Niccolò Mansueto | 1.82 m (6 ft 0 in) | 79 kg (174 lb) | 8 August 2004 (aged 21) | (Switzerland) HC Sierre |
| 88 | F | Tommaso de Luca | 1.83 m (6 ft 0 in) | 85 kg (187 lb) | 29 December 2004 (aged 21) | (Switzerland) HC Ambrì-Piotta |
| 90 | D | Dylan Di Perna | 1.88 m (6 ft 2 in) | 98 kg (216 lb) | 26 April 1996 (aged 30) | (Italy) HC Bolzano |
| 93 | F | Luca Frigo – A | 1.83 m (6 ft 0 in) | 90 kg (200 lb) | 30 May 1993 (aged 32) | (Italy) HC Bolzano |

=== Norway ===
The roster was announced on 8 May 2026.

Head coach: Petter Thoresen

| No. | Pos. | Name | Height | Weight | Birthdate | Team |
|---|---|---|---|---|---|---|
| 4 | D | Johannes Johannesen | 1.81 m (5 ft 11 in) | 85 kg (187 lb) | 1 March 1997 (aged 29) | (Finland) Lahti Pelicans |
| 6 | D | Victor Kopperstad | 1.88 m (6 ft 2 in) | 88 kg (194 lb) | 6 February 2006 (aged 20) | (Sweden) Mora IK |
| 8 | F | Mikkel Øby Olsen | 1.79 m (5 ft 10 in) | 78 kg (172 lb) | 22 June 2002 (aged 23) | (Sweden) IK Oskarshamn |
| 12 | F | Noah Steen | 1.85 m (6 ft 1 in) | 86 kg (190 lb) | 16 August 2004 (aged 21) | (Sweden) Örebro HK |
| 13 | F | Petter Vesterheim | 1.81 m (5 ft 11 in) | 80 kg (180 lb) | 30 September 2004 (aged 21) | (Sweden) Malmö Redhawks |
| 17 | F | Eirik Salsten | 1.85 m (6 ft 1 in) | 88 kg (194 lb) | 17 June 1994 (aged 31) | (Germany) Iserlohn Roosters |
| 18 | F | Thomas Olsen | 1.86 m (6 ft 1 in) | 92 kg (203 lb) | 25 June 1995 (aged 30) | (Finland) Mikkelin Jukurit |
| 19 | F | Håvard Østrem Salsten | 1.88 m (6 ft 2 in) | 92 kg (203 lb) | 19 August 2000 (aged 25) | (Sweden) Djurgårdens IF |
| 20 | F | Mathias Emilio Pettersen | 1.80 m (5 ft 11 in) | 82 kg (181 lb) | 3 April 2000 (aged 26) | (Sweden) Djurgårdens IF |
| 21 | F | Mikkel Eriksen | 1.80 m (5 ft 11 in) | 85 kg (187 lb) | 13 September 2007 (aged 18) | (Sweden) Färjestad BK |
| 22 | F | Martin Rønnild | 1.86 m (6 ft 1 in) | 95 kg (209 lb) | 24 January 1996 (aged 30) | (Norway) Storhamar Hockey |
| 24 | F | Jacob Berglund | 1.85 m (6 ft 1 in) | 92 kg (203 lb) | 17 November 1991 (aged 34) | (Norway) Storhamar Hockey |
| 26 | F | Patrick Elvsveen | 1.76 m (5 ft 9 in) | 84 kg (185 lb) | 16 September 2002 (aged 23) | (Norway) Stavanger Oilers |
| 27 | F | Andreas Martinsen – C | 1.90 m (6 ft 3 in) | 105 kg (231 lb) | 13 June 1990 (aged 35) | (Norway) Storhamar Hockey |
| 28 | F | Michael Brandsegg-Nygård | 1.84 m (6 ft 0 in) | 94 kg (207 lb) | 5 October 2005 (aged 20) | (United States) Detroit Red Wings |
| 29 | D | Kristian Østby | 1.98 m (6 ft 6 in) | 98 kg (216 lb) | 30 January 1996 (aged 30) | (Norway) Stavanger Oilers |
| 30 | G | Tobias Normann | 1.86 m (6 ft 1 in) | 85 kg (187 lb) | 3 August 2001 (aged 24) | (Sweden) Frölunda HC |
| 32 | G | Mathias Schjerpen Arnkværn | 1.86 m (6 ft 1 in) | 87 kg (192 lb) | 7 November 2003 (aged 22) | (Norway) Vålerenga Ishockey |
| 37 | F | Markus Vikingstad | 1.94 m (6 ft 4 in) | 96 kg (212 lb) | 27 October 1999 (aged 26) | (Germany) Eisbären Berlin |
| 40 | G | Henrik Haukeland | 1.88 m (6 ft 2 in) | 93 kg (205 lb) | 6 December 1994 (aged 31) | (Germany) Straubing Tigers |
| 43 | D | Max Krogdahl – A | 1.88 m (6 ft 2 in) | 93 kg (205 lb) | 21 October 1998 (aged 27) | (Sweden) Skellefteå AIK |
| 44 | F | Tinus Luc Koblar | 1.91 m (6 ft 3 in) | 88 kg (194 lb) | 21 July 2007 (aged 18) | (Sweden) Leksands IF |
| 47 | D | Adrian Saxrud-Danielsen | 1.90 m (6 ft 3 in) | 93 kg (205 lb) | 27 September 1992 (aged 33) | (Norway) Storhamar Hockey |
| 49 | D | Christian Kåsastul – A | 1.78 m (5 ft 10 in) | 86 kg (190 lb) | 9 April 1997 (aged 29) | (Norway) Frisk Asker Ishockey |
| 54 | D | Sander Hurrod | 1.85 m (6 ft 1 in) | 85 kg (187 lb) | 2 April 2000 (aged 26) | (Norway) Storhamar Hockey |
| 71 | F | Eskild Bakke Olsen | 1.87 m (6 ft 2 in) | 93 kg (205 lb) | 19 March 2002 (aged 24) | (Sweden) Linköping HC |
| 72 | D | Stian Solberg | 1.89 m (6 ft 2 in) | 92 kg (203 lb) | 29 December 2005 (aged 20) | (United States) San Diego Gulls |

=== Slovakia ===
The roster was announced on 13 May 2026.

Head coach: Vladimír Országh

| No. | Pos. | Name | Height | Weight | Birthdate | Team |
|---|---|---|---|---|---|---|
| 4 | D | Jakub Meliško | 1.83 m (6 ft 0 in) | 85 kg (187 lb) | 25 June 1996 (aged 29) | (Slovakia) HK Dukla Michalovce |
| 6 | D | Viliam Kmec | 1.89 m (6 ft 2 in) | 98 kg (216 lb) | 2 January 2004 (aged 22) | (United States) Henderson Silver Knights |
| 7 | D | Maxim Štrbák | 1.89 m (6 ft 2 in) | 91 kg (201 lb) | 13 April 2005 (aged 21) | (United States) Rochester Americans |
| 8 | F | Oliver Okuliar | 1.87 m (6 ft 2 in) | 86 kg (190 lb) | 24 May 2000 (aged 25) | (Sweden) Skellefteå AIK |
| 9 | F | Filip Mešár | 1.79 m (5 ft 10 in) | 84 kg (185 lb) | 3 January 2004 (aged 22) | (Canada) Laval Rocket |
| 10 | F | Adam Sýkora | 1.80 m (5 ft 11 in) | 88 kg (194 lb) | 7 September 2004 (aged 21) | (United States) New York Rangers |
| 12 | D | Samuel Kňažko | 1.86 m (6 ft 1 in) | 86 kg (190 lb) | 7 August 2002 (aged 23) | (Czech Republic) HC Vítkovice Ridera |
| 13 | D | František Gajdoš | 1.80 m (5 ft 11 in) | 87 kg (192 lb) | 7 June 2001 (aged 24) | (Czech Republic) HC Litvínov |
| 15 | F | Jakub Minárik | 1.93 m (6 ft 4 in) | 97 kg (214 lb) | 6 July 2000 (aged 25) | (Czech Republic) HC Energie Karlovy Vary |
| 21 | F | Sebastián Čederle | 1.85 m (6 ft 1 in) | 95 kg (209 lb) | 21 February 2000 (aged 26) | (Slovakia) HK Nitra |
| 22 | F | Kristián Pospíšil | 1.88 m (6 ft 2 in) | 99 kg (218 lb) | 22 April 1996 (aged 30) | (Czech Republic) HC Kometa Brno |
| 23 | F | Adam Liška | 1.80 m (5 ft 11 in) | 84 kg (185 lb) | 14 October 1999 (aged 26) | (Russia) Severstal Cherepovets |
| 26 | D | Luka Radivojevič | 1.78 m (5 ft 10 in) | 84 kg (185 lb) | 3 January 2007 (aged 19) | (United States) Boston College Eagles |
| 27 | F | Marek Hrivík – C | 1.86 m (6 ft 1 in) | 92 kg (203 lb) | 28 August 1991 (aged 34) | (Czech Republic) HC Vítkovice Ridera |
| 30 | G | Adam Gajan | 1.91 m (6 ft 3 in) | 82 kg (181 lb) | 6 May 2004 (aged 22) | (United States) Rockford IceHogs |
| 31 | G | Samuel Hlavaj | 1.93 m (6 ft 4 in) | 99 kg (218 lb) | 29 May 2001 (aged 24) | (United States) Iowa Wild |
| 33 | G | Eugen Rabčan | 1.90 m (6 ft 3 in) | 93 kg (205 lb) | 28 June 2001 (aged 24) | (Slovakia) HC MONACObet Banská Bystrica |
| 42 | F | Aurel Nauš | 1.73 m (5 ft 8 in) | 80 kg (180 lb) | 1 April 1998 (aged 28) | (Slovakia) HK Poprad |
| 44 | D | Mislav Rosandić | 1.80 m (5 ft 11 in) | 86 kg (190 lb) | 26 January 1995 (aged 31) | (Slovakia) HC Košice |
| 64 | D | Patrik Koch | 1.86 m (6 ft 1 in) | 86 kg (190 lb) | 8 December 1996 (aged 29) | (Czech Republic) HC Oceláři Třinec |
| 72 | F | Andrej Kollár | 1.88 m (6 ft 2 in) | 95 kg (209 lb) | 4 November 1999 (aged 26) | (Czech Republic) HC Kometa Brno |
| 76 | F | Martin Pospíšil – A | 1.88 m (6 ft 2 in) | 84 kg (185 lb) | 19 November 1999 (aged 26) | (Canada) Calgary Flames |
| 77 | F | Martin Faško-Rudáš – A | 1.85 m (6 ft 1 in) | 82 kg (181 lb) | 10 August 2000 (aged 25) | (Czech Republic) HC Bílí Tygři Liberec |
| 83 | F | Servác Petrovský | 1.79 m (5 ft 10 in) | 81 kg (179 lb) | 10 August 2004 (aged 21) | (Czech Republic) HC Bílí Tygři Liberec |
| 88 | F | Martin Chromiak | 1.85 m (6 ft 1 in) | 90 kg (200 lb) | 20 August 2002 (aged 23) | (United States) Ontario Reign |

=== Slovenia ===
The roster was announced on 12 May 2026.

Head coach: Edo Terglav

| No. | Pos. | Name | Height | Weight | Birthdate | Team |
|---|---|---|---|---|---|---|
| 6 | D | Miha Štebih | 1.90 m (6 ft 3 in) | 92 kg (203 lb) | 7 April 1992 (aged 34) | (Czech Republic) SK Horácká Slavia Třebíč |
| 8 | F | Marcel Mahkovec | 1.80 m (5 ft 11 in) | 84 kg (185 lb) | 17 December 2003 (aged 22) | (Slovenia) HK Olimpija |
| 10 | F | Miha Beričič | 1.93 m (6 ft 4 in) | 88 kg (194 lb) | 15 April 2004 (aged 22) | (Slovenia) HK Olimpija |
| 12 | F | Nik Simšič | 1.80 m (5 ft 11 in) | 86 kg (190 lb) | 12 March 1997 (aged 29) | (Slovenia) HK Olimpija |
| 13 | F | Nace Langus | 1.86 m (6 ft 1 in) | 87 kg (192 lb) | 5 December 2004 (aged 21) | (United States) Augustana Vikings |
| 15 | D | Blaž Gregorc – A | 1.90 m (6 ft 3 in) | 95 kg (209 lb) | 18 January 1990 (aged 36) | (Slovenia) HK Olimpija |
| 17 | D | Jan Goličič | 1.96 m (6 ft 5 in) | 93 kg (205 lb) | 30 June 2006 (aged 19) | (Canada) Blainville-Boisbriand Armada |
| 18 | F | Ken Ograjenšek | 1.75 m (5 ft 9 in) | 81 kg (179 lb) | 30 August 1991 (aged 34) | (Austria) Steinbach Black Wings Linz |
| 21 | F | Jan Drozg | 1.85 m (6 ft 1 in) | 85 kg (187 lb) | 1 April 1999 (aged 27) | (Slovenia) HK Olimpija |
| 23 | F | Jaka Sodja | 1.76 m (5 ft 9 in) | 85 kg (187 lb) | 17 December 1999 (aged 26) | (Slovenia) HK Olimpija |
| 24 | F | Rok Tičar – A | 1.79 m (5 ft 10 in) | 80 kg (180 lb) | 3 May 1989 (aged 37) | (Italy) HC Pustertal Wölfe |
| 25 | F | Luka Maver | 1.90 m (6 ft 3 in) | 87 kg (192 lb) | 25 October 1997 (aged 28) | (Austria) Steinbach Black Wings Linz |
| 26 | D | Maks Perčič | 1.87 m (6 ft 2 in) | 92 kg (203 lb) | 2 April 2004 (aged 22) | (Czech Republic) HC Slavia Praha |
| 29 | D | Aleksandar Magovac | 1.81 m (5 ft 11 in) | 91 kg (201 lb) | 9 February 1991 (aged 35) | (France) Gothiques d'Amiens |
| 30 | G | Luka Kolin | 1.83 m (6 ft 0 in) | 75 kg (165 lb) | 24 November 2003 (aged 22) | (Slovenia) HK Olimpija |
| 33 | G | Žan Us | 1.80 m (5 ft 11 in) | 80 kg (180 lb) | 10 June 1996 (aged 29) | (Slovenia) HDD Jesenice |
| 41 | D | Jan Ćosić | 1.78 m (5 ft 10 in) | 80 kg (180 lb) | 7 March 2003 (aged 23) | (Slovenia) HK Olimpija |
| 44 | D | Aljoša Crnovič | 1.90 m (6 ft 3 in) | 85 kg (187 lb) | 16 April 1999 (aged 27) | (Slovenia) HK Olimpija |
| 46 | F | Matic Török – A | 1.80 m (5 ft 11 in) | 86 kg (190 lb) | 26 July 2003 (aged 22) | (Finland) Ilves |
| 49 | F | Filip Sitar | 1.80 m (5 ft 11 in) | 85 kg (187 lb) | 29 June 2005 (aged 20) | (United States) RPI Engineers |
| 55 | F | Robert Sabolič – C | 1.83 m (6 ft 0 in) | 91 kg (201 lb) | 18 September 1988 (aged 37) | (Slovenia) HK Olimpija |
| 61 | G | Lukaš Horak | 1.86 m (6 ft 1 in) | 81 kg (179 lb) | 5 October 1993 (aged 32) | (Slovenia) HK Olimpija |
| 86 | D | Rožle Bohinc | 1.88 m (6 ft 2 in) | 80 kg (180 lb) | 15 February 2004 (aged 22) | (Slovenia) HK Olimpija |
| 91 | F | Žan Jezovšek | 1.85 m (6 ft 1 in) | 98 kg (216 lb) | 22 April 1997 (aged 29) | (Germany) EV Lindau Islanders |
| 92 | F | Anže Kuralt | 1.75 m (5 ft 9 in) | 80 kg (180 lb) | 31 October 1991 (aged 34) | (Hungary) Fehérvár AV19 |

=== Sweden ===
The roster was announced on 11 May 2026.

Head Coach: Sam Hallam

| No. | Pos. | Name | Height | Weight | Birthdate | Team |
|---|---|---|---|---|---|---|
| 4 | D | Jacob Larsson | 1.88 m (6 ft 2 in) | 91 kg (201 lb) | 29 April 1997 (aged 29) | (Switzerland) SC Rapperswil-Jona Lakers |
| 8 | D | Robert Hägg | 1.88 m (6 ft 2 in) | 93 kg (205 lb) | 8 February 1995 (aged 31) | (Sweden) Brynäs IF |
| 9 | F | Linus Karlsson | 1.86 m (6 ft 1 in) | 88 kg (194 lb) | 16 November 1999 (aged 26) | (Canada) Vancouver Canucks |
| 10 | F | Simon Holmström | 1.86 m (6 ft 1 in) | 97 kg (214 lb) | 24 May 2001 (aged 24) | (United States) New York Islanders |
| 13 | F | Lucas Raymond – A | 1.83 m (6 ft 0 in) | 85 kg (187 lb) | 28 March 2002 (aged 24) | (United States) Detroit Red Wings |
| 14 | D | Mattias Ekholm – A | 1.93 m (6 ft 4 in) | 98 kg (216 lb) | 24 May 1990 (aged 35) | (Canada) Edmonton Oilers |
| 15 | F | Jack Berglund | 1.92 m (6 ft 4 in) | 95 kg (209 lb) | 10 April 2006 (aged 20) | (United States) Lehigh Valley Phantoms |
| 16 | F | Anton Frondell | 1.86 m (6 ft 1 in) | 91 kg (201 lb) | 7 May 2007 (aged 19) | (United States) Chicago Blackhawks |
| 20 | F | André Petersson | 1.80 m (5 ft 11 in) | 88 kg (194 lb) | 11 September 1990 (aged 35) | (Switzerland) SCL Tigers |
| 23 | D | Oliver Ekman-Larsson – C | 1.86 m (6 ft 1 in) | 88 kg (194 lb) | 17 July 1991 (aged 34) | (Canada) Toronto Maple Leafs |
| 26 | D | Erik Brännström | 1.79 m (5 ft 10 in) | 81 kg (179 lb) | 2 September 1999 (aged 26) | (Switzerland) Lausanne HC |
| 33 | F | Jakob Silfverberg | 1.86 m (6 ft 1 in) | 97 kg (214 lb) | 13 October 1990 (aged 35) | (Sweden) Brynäs IF |
| 34 | D | Albert Johansson | 1.85 m (6 ft 1 in) | 87 kg (192 lb) | 4 January 2001 (aged 25) | (United States) Detroit Red Wings |
| 40 | G | Arvid Söderblom | 1.93 m (6 ft 4 in) | 94 kg (207 lb) | 19 August 1999 (aged 26) | (United States) Chicago Blackhawks |
| 41 | F | Ivar Stenberg | 1.81 m (5 ft 11 in) | 83 kg (183 lb) | 30 September 2007 (aged 18) | (Sweden) Frölunda HC |
| 45 | G | Magnus Hellberg | 1.97 m (6 ft 6 in) | 93 kg (205 lb) | 4 April 1991 (aged 35) | (Sweden) Djurgårdens IF |
| 51 | F | Emil Heineman | 1.87 m (6 ft 2 in) | 92 kg (203 lb) | 16 November 2001 (aged 24) | (United States) New York Islanders |
| 61 | F | Viggo Björck | 1.77 m (5 ft 10 in) | 80 kg (180 lb) | 12 March 2008 (aged 18) | (Sweden) Djurgårdens IF |
| 70 | F | Oskar Sundqvist | 1.91 m (6 ft 3 in) | 95 kg (209 lb) | 23 March 1994 (aged 32) | (United States) St. Louis Blues |
| 72 | D | Tim Heed | 1.83 m (6 ft 0 in) | 87 kg (192 lb) | 27 January 1991 (aged 35) | (Switzerland) HC Ambrì-Piotta |
| 73 | G | Love Härenstam | 1.87 m (6 ft 2 in) | 88 kg (194 lb) | 18 January 2007 (aged 19) | (Sweden) Södertälje SK |
| 74 | F | Rasmus Asplund | 1.80 m (5 ft 11 in) | 86 kg (190 lb) | 3 December 1997 (aged 28) | (Switzerland) HC Davos |
| 91 | F | Carl Grundström | 1.84 m (6 ft 0 in) | 91 kg (201 lb) | 1 December 1997 (aged 28) | (United States) Philadelphia Flyers |
| 94 | D | Joel Persson | 1.86 m (6 ft 1 in) | 89 kg (196 lb) | 4 March 1994 (aged 32) | (Sweden) Växjö Lakers |
| 95 | F | Jacob de la Rose | 1.90 m (6 ft 3 in) | 94 kg (207 lb) | 20 May 1995 (aged 30) | (Switzerland) HC Fribourg-Gottéron |
