= Slafkovský =

Slafkovský (feminine: Slafkovská) is a Slovak surname. Notable people with the surname include:

- Alexander Slafkovský (born 1983), Slovak slalom canoeist
- Juraj Slafkovský (born 2004), Slovak professional ice hockey forward
