= 2021 Deutschland Cup =

Tournament details
- Host country: Germany
- Venue: 1 (in 1 host city)
- Dates: 11–14 November
- Teams: 4

Final positions
- Champions: Germany (8th title)
- Runners-up: Slovakia
- Third place: Switzerland
- Fourth place: Russia

Tournament statistics
- Games played: 6
- Goals scored: 32 (5.33 per game)
- Attendance: 13,008 (2,168 per game)

The 2021 Deutschland Cup was the 32nd edition of the tournament, held between 11 and 14 November 2021.

Germany won the tournament for the eighth time.

== Standings ==
Pos	Team	Pld	W	OTW	OTL	L	GF	GA	GD	Pts
1	Germany	3	3	0	0	0	11	4	+7	9
2	Slovakia	3	2	0	0	1	11	6	+5	6
3	Switzerland	3	1	0	0	2	4	12	−8	3
4	Russia	3	0	0	0	3	6	10	−4	0

Source: IIHF
Rules for classification: 1) points; 2) head-to-head points; 3) head-to-head goal difference; 4) head-to-head number of goals scored.

== Results ==
All times are local (UTC+1).

11 November 2021; 16:15	Slovakia	7–1 (1–1, 1–0, 5–0)	Switzerland	Yayla Arena, Krefeld; Attendance: 1,560

Game reference

Matej Tomek
Goalies
Philip Wüthrich
Referees:
(Latvia) Andris Ansons
(Germany) André Schrader
Linesmen:
(United States) William Hancock
(Germany) Jonas Merten

Gríger (Krištof, Holešinský) – 03:00	1–0
	1–1	12:31 – Corvi (Moser)
Gríger (Šiška) – 29:32	2–1
Krištof (Takáč, Mešár) (PP) – 46:11	3–1
Holešinský (Regenda) (EN) – 57:49	4–1
Gríger (EA, EN) – 58:15	5–1
Takáč (Krištof) – 58:42	6–1
Hrehorčák (Gríger, Mudrák) (PP) – 59:57	7–1

4 min
Penalties
35 min
43
Shots
25

11 November 2021; 19:45	Germany	4–3 (2–2, 1–0, 1–1)	Russia	Yayla Arena, Krefeld; Attendance: 1,560

Game reference

Andreas Jenike
Goalies
Alexander Samonov
Referees:
(United States) Sean MacFarlane
(United States) Stephen Reneau
Linesmen:
(Slovakia) Šimon Synek
(Latvia) Dāvis Zunde

	0–1	07:30 – Groshev (Tyanulin)
	0–2	08:10 – Tsyplakov (Dynyak)
Bergmann – 09:05	1–2
Ehliz (Wagner, Hager) – 12:52	2–2
Pföderl (Pietta, Ankert) – 27:29	3–2
Rieder (Pföderl, Noebels) (PP) – 41:39	4–2
	4–3	53:11 – Sorkin (Tyanulin, Guskov)

8 min
Penalties
8 min
28
Shots
26

13 November 2021; 14:30	Germany	3–0 (0–0, 1–0, 2–0)	Switzerland	Yayla Arena, Krefeld; Attendance: 2,678

Game reference

Dustin Strahlmeier
Goalies
Joren van Pottelberghe
Referees:
(Latvia) Andris Ansons
(Germany) André Schrader
Linesmen:
(United States) William Hancock
(Slovakia) Šimon Synek

Rieder (Noebels, Loibl) (PP) – 27:13	1–0
Pföderl (Noebels, Loibl) – 58:11	2–0
Hager (Ehliz) (EA, EN) – 59:23	3–0

8 min
Penalties
10 min
26
Shots
28

13 November 2021; 18:00	Russia	1–3 (1–2, 0–0, 0–1)	Slovakia	Yayla Arena, Krefeld; Attendance: 2,729

Game reference

Alexander Samonov
Goalies
Matej Tomek
Referees:
(Germany) Lukas Kohlmüller
(United States) Stephen Reneau
Linesmen:
(Germany) Markus Merk
(Latvia) Dāvis Zunde

Bychkov (Ovchinnikov) – 02:38	1–0
	1–1	05:43 – Takáč
	1–2	13:23 – Holešinský (Roman)
	1–3	51:40 – Buček (Gríger, Hrehorčák)

4 min
Penalties
6 min
28
Shots
34

14 November 2021; 11:00	Switzerland	3–2 (0–1, 2–1, 1–0)	Russia	Yayla Arena, Krefeld; Attendance: 2,172

Game reference

Ludovic Waeber
Goalies
Andrei Kareyev
Referees:
(Germany) Lukas Kohlmüller
(United States) Sean MacFarlane
Linesmen:
(Germany) Markus Merk
(Slovakia) Šimon Synek

	0–1	19:38 – Pautov (Sorkin, Tsyplakov) (PP)
	0–2	29:38 – Goncharuk
Ambühl (Corvi, Moser) – 36:55	1–2
Andrighetto (Vermin, Martschini) – 38:18	2–2
Pestoni (Alatalo) – 58:10	3–2

10 min
Penalties
4 min
32
Shots
24

14 November 2021; 14:30	Germany	4–1 (2–0, 1–1, 1–0)	Slovakia	Yayla Arena, Krefeld; Attendance: 2,309

Game reference

Dustin Strahlmeier
Goalies
Filip Belányi
Referees:
(Latvia) Andris Ansons
(United States) Stephen Reneau
Linesmen:
(United States) William Hancock
(Germany) Jonas Merten

Pföderl (Noebels, Rieder) – 00:14	1–0
Rieder (Noebels) – 05:38	2–0
	2–1	25:50 – Buček
Bittner (Eder) (PP) – 38:43	3–1
Rieder – 55:31	4–1

4 min
Penalties
2 min
22
Shots
30
