= Ice hockey in Slovakia =

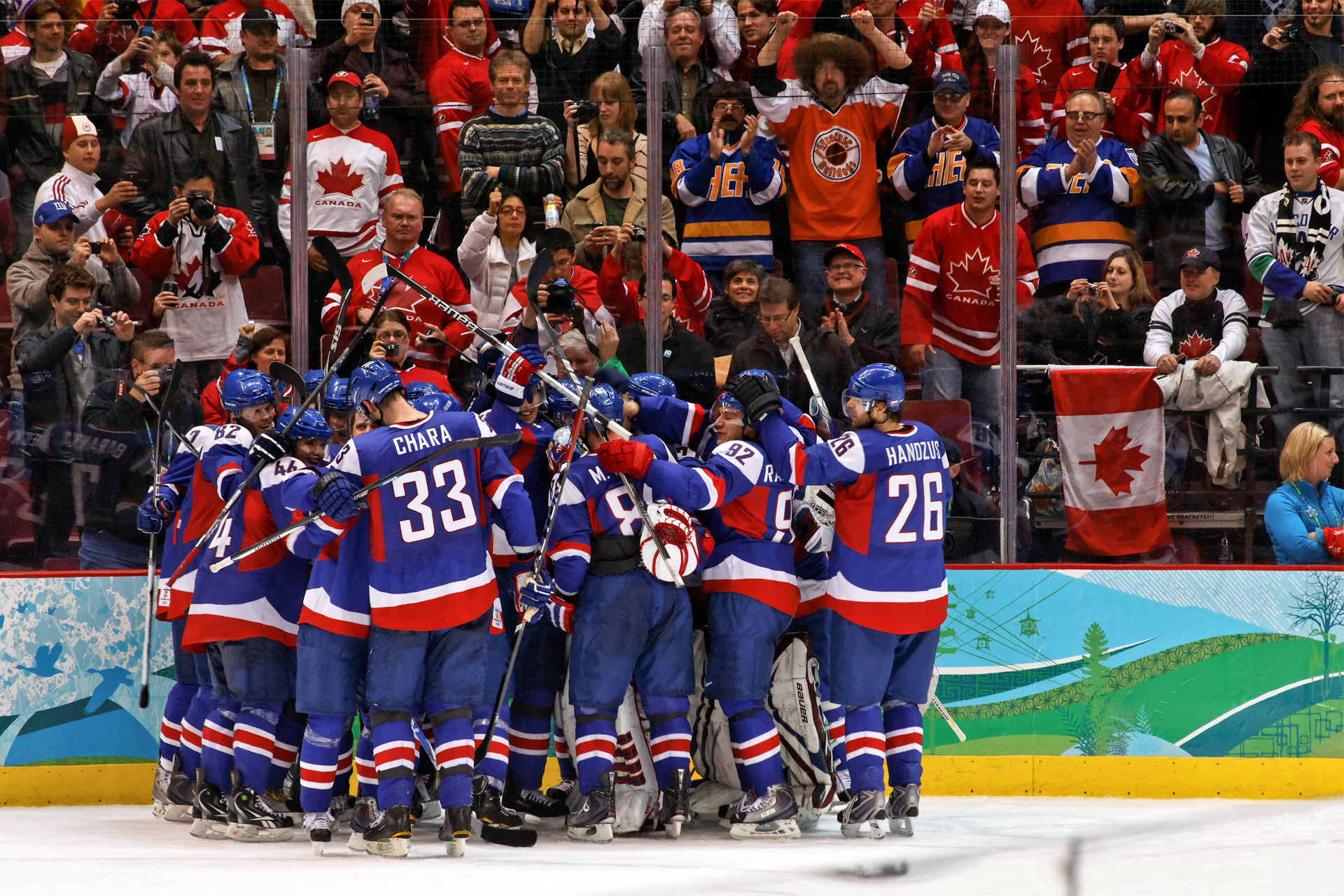
- Country: Slovakia
- Governing body: Slovak Ice Hockey Federation
- National teams: Men's national team; Women's national team

National competitions
- Slovak Extraliga; Slovenská hokejová liga

International competitions
- IIHF World Championships; Winter Olympics; World Cup

In 1908, the International Ice Hockey Federation, an international organization that still runs most of the international hockey tournaments today, was established. In Slovakia (as a part of former Czechoslovakia), Canadian-styled ice hockey was popularized during the European Championships in High Tatras in 1925.

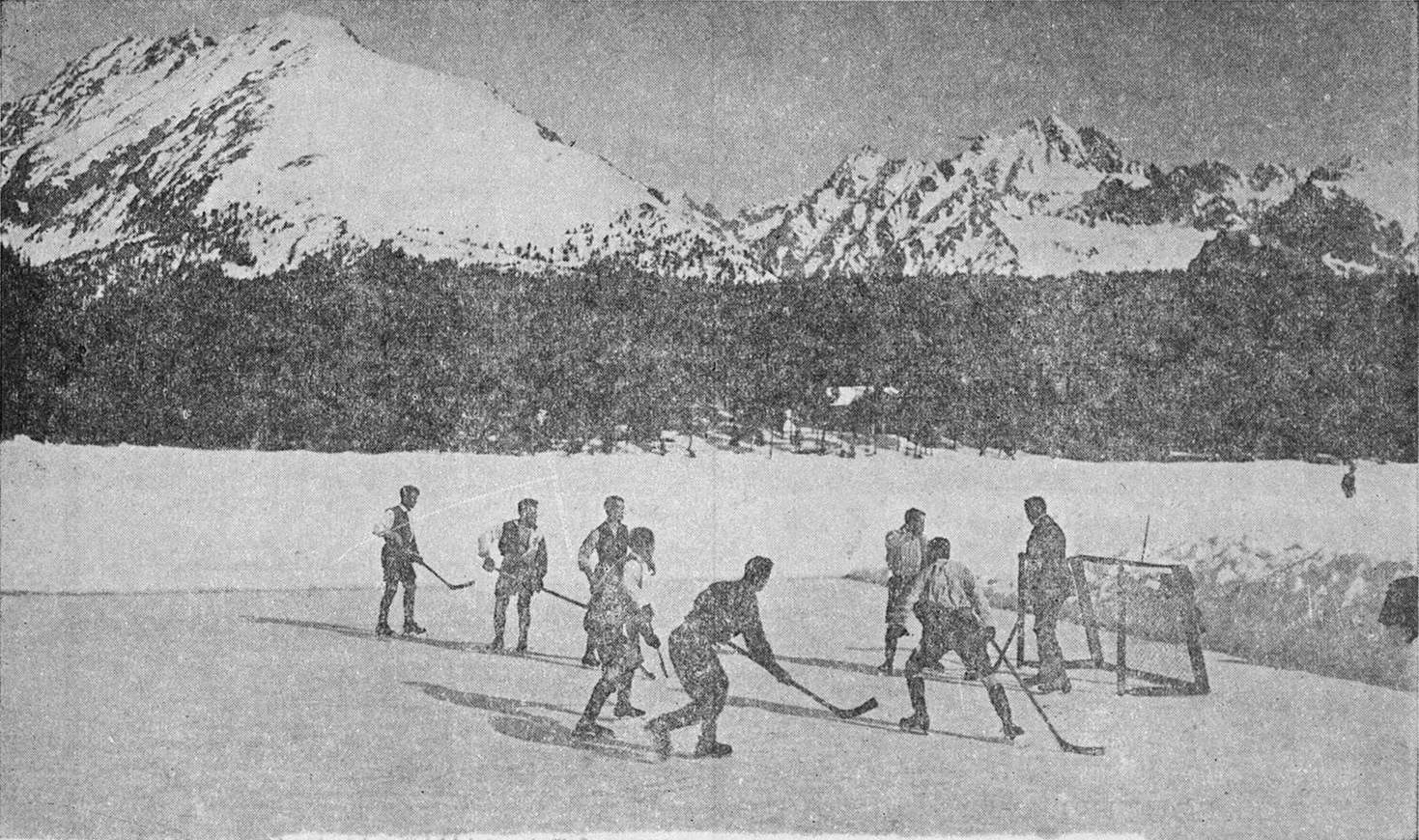
Ice hockey on the lake Štrbské pleso, c.1927

In 1929 the first official tournament took place in Slovakia. The Tatra Cup is the second-oldest ice hockey tournament in Europe, after the Spengler Cup in Switzerland. The first organization of Slovak ice hockey was established under the name of Slovenská župa kanadského ľadového hokeja as a part of the Slovak Ice Hockey Federation in what was then Czechoslovakia.

The first organized competition was held in 1930.

Throughout ice hockey history in Czechoslovakia, many Slovak players became eligible to play for the Czechoslovak national team. Among those who were able to achieve this was Ladislav Troják; A native of Košice who left for Prague in 1934 to play for the LTC Praha, which was at those times considered to be the best ice hockey team in the country. From there, he was only a step away from playing for the national team.

Czechoslovakia and its successor states are rated as being among the leading nations on the international scene, thanks to their triumphs in the Winter Olympic Games and the World Championships.

However, the Slovak national team had to face a difficult challenge in 1993 after the dissolution of Czechoslovakia. According to the IIHF regulations, it had to compete with countries with little or no ice hockey tradition at all to prove being worthy to compete at the highest level. Within only a few years of independent existence as a young nation, it would mark its biggest triumph ever by winning the world championships in Sweden in 2002.

As of July 2017, a total of 76 outfield players and four goaltenders with Slovak citizenship have played at least one game in the National Hockey League. The players in the following list have the most scorer points in the NHL.

== See also ==
- History of ice hockey
- Slovakia national ice hockey team
