= Juraj Slafkovský =

Slovak ice hockey player (born 2004)

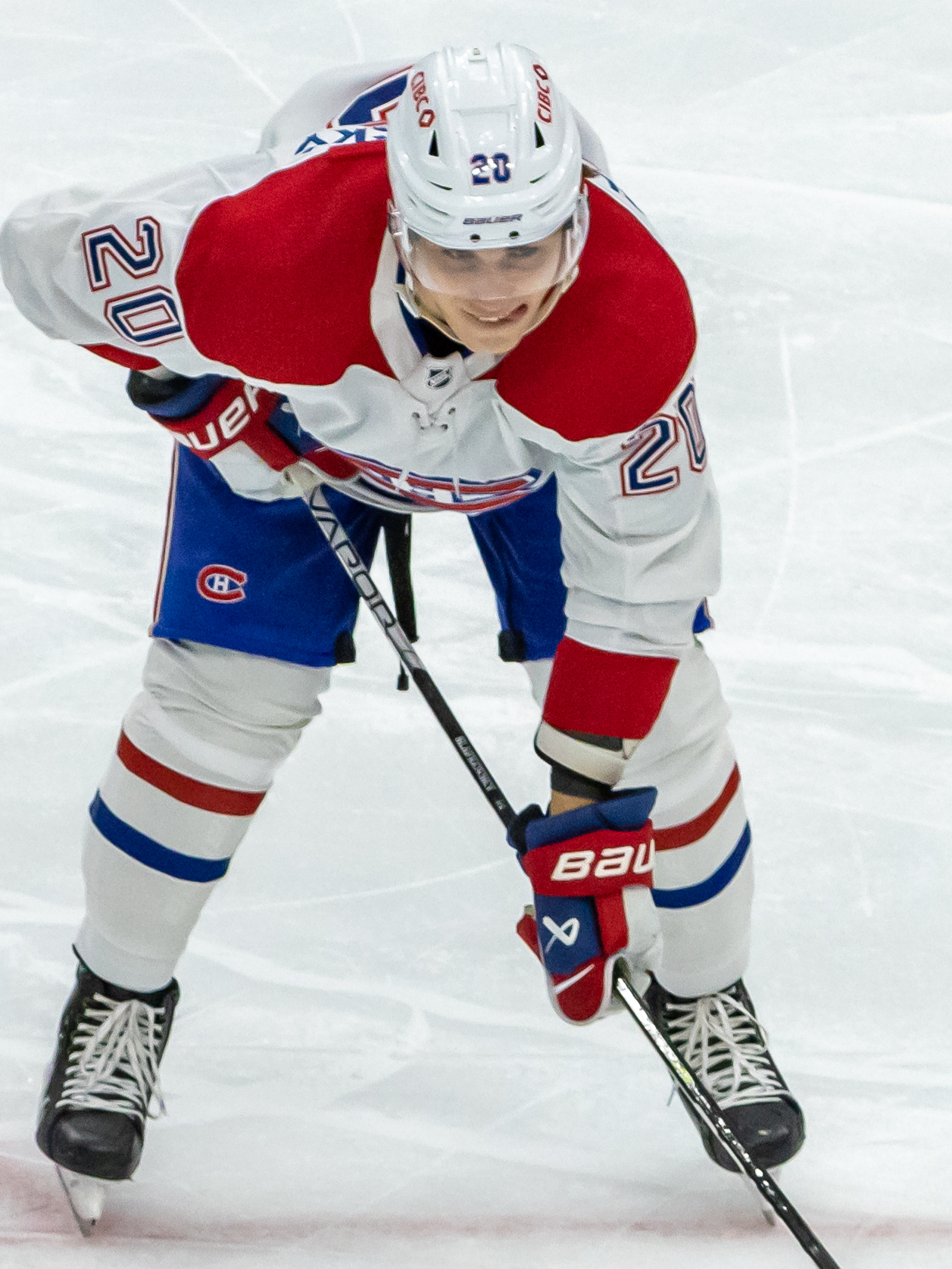
- Slafkovský with the Montreal Canadiens in December 2022
- Born: 30 March 2004 (age 22) Košice, Slovakia
- Height: 6 ft 3 in (191 cm)
- Weight: 230 lb (104 kg; 16 st 6 lb)
- Position: Forward
- Shoots: Left
- NHL team Former teams: Montreal Canadiens; TPS
- National team: Slovakia
- NHL draft: 1st overall, 2022; Montreal Canadiens
- Playing career: 2021–present

Juraj Slafkovský (born 30 March 2004) is a Slovak professional ice hockey player who is a forward for the Montreal Canadiens of the National Hockey League (NHL). He was selected first overall in the 2022 NHL entry draft by the Canadiens, the highest-drafted Slovak player in the history of the NHL.

Slafkovský first rose to prominence as a member of the Slovak national team at the 2022 Winter Olympics, where he played a pivotal role in the country's first-ever Olympic medal in ice hockey. Leading the tournament in scoring, he was named its most valuable player. He was identified as part of a new generation of promising Slovak hockey players.

== Playing career ==
=== Liiga ===
Slafkovský first left home at the age of 14 to train at Red Bull's ice hockey academy, located in Austria. Thereafter, he spent time in the Czech Republic competing against older teenagers, before joining HC TPS in search of a higher class of competition. Slafkovský played three seasons with TPS U20 of the Finnish junior league, before making his debut in the Liiga for the 2021–22 season. His debut in the senior men's ranks was initially inauspicious, recording only one goal in his first 20 games. After returning from his breakout performance at the 2022 Winter Olympics, Slafkovský's play improved noticeably, and he finished the regular season with five goals and five assists. He went on to record two goals and five assists in 18 playoff games. TPS advanced to face Tappara for the Kanada-malja, with the latter winning the championship series in five games.

=== National Hockey League ===
==== 2022 NHL entry draft ====
Slafkovský was eligible for the 2022 NHL entry draft and, by mid-season assessment, was being considered as a potential top-five selection based on the strength of his international performances. Shane Wright of the Ontario Hockey League's (OHL) Kingston Frontenacs, cited as the presumptive first overall pick at the beginning of the season, was judged by many as having "left the door open for someone to unseat him" after a subpar start. As the draft approached, Slafkovský had emerged as Wright's primary challenger, and topped a number of rankings by scouts and commentators alike. After the Montreal Canadiens secured the first overall pick via the annual draft lottery, team general manager Kent Hughes confirmed that the Canadiens' choice was between Slafkovský, Wright and Logan Cooley of the USA Hockey National Team Development Program.

On 7 July 2022, the Canadiens used the first overall pick to select Slafkovský, making him the highest-drafted Slovak player in the history of the NHL, surpassing Marián Gáborík, who had been taken third overall in 2000. With defenceman and fellow countryman Šimon Nemec selected second overall by the New Jersey Devils, this was only the second time in the history of the NHL draft that a single European country had the top two selections in a single year (following Russia in 2004). The Canadiens also selected Filip Mešár, another Slovak player and longtime friend of Slafkovský's, later in the first round. Shortly after the draft, Slafkovský signed a three-year, entry-level contract with the Canadiens.

==== Montreal Canadiens (2022–present) ====
With his preferred number 20 jersey already in use by veteran defenceman Chris Wideman upon arrival in Montreal, Wideman agreed to cede the number to Slafkovský in exchange for an autographed jersey as a keepsake for his newborn son. His performance in the pre-season was a subject of considerable media interest, with Sportsnet saying he "at times appeared out of his element," whereas team general manager Kent Hughes stated, "we've seen the start of a process of adjusting from hockey in Europe to hockey in North America". While Slafkovský would be allowed to develop with the Canadiens, there existed a possibility of him spending time with the Canadiens' American Hockey League (AHL) affiliate, the Laval Rocket. On 10 October 2022, it was confirmed that he had made the Canadiens' opening night roster for the 2022–23 season. He appeared in his first NHL game on 12 October, a 4–3 victory over their traditional archrival, the Toronto Maple Leafs. In his fifth game with the team on 20 October, Slafkovský scored his first goal in the NHL during a 6–2 rout of the Arizona Coyotes. After missing three games with an unspecified upper body injury, Slafkovský returned to the lineup on 29 October and was placed on the power play for the first time, where he scored his first power play marker (and second NHL goal) that same night against the St. Louis Blues. In a game against the Detroit Red Wings on 8 November, he was called for boarding Red Wings forward Matt Luff, for which he was given a two-game suspension by league officials. After sustaining a knee injury in a 15 January 2023 game against the New York Rangers, the Canadiens announced that Slafkovský would be out for a period of three months, bringing his season to a premature end. He finished his rookie campaign with four goals and ten points in 39 games.

Paired with Kirby Dach for the majority of the 2023 pre-season, Slafkovský enjoyed success alongside the centreman. The duo were joined by newcomer Alex Newhook to begin the 2023–24 season, but a serious injury sustained by Dach in just the team's second game brought an abrupt end to the line combination. Replaced with Josh Anderson, the new trio struggled noticeably over the ensuing month, with discussion brewing as to whether Slafkovský should be sent to the AHL in light of his lack of production. Instead, head coach Martin St. Louis opted to promote him to the Canadiens' first line in December alongside Cole Caufield and captain Nick Suzuki. Slafkovský enjoyed substantially increased production over the remainder of the season, setting a franchise record with an eight-game point streak as a teenager in February, following up with a separate nine-game streak in March to establish yet another franchise record for most points in a season by a teenager, surpassing Henri Richard. On 10 April 2024, he scored his first career NHL hat-trick against the Philadelphia Flyers in a 9–3 victory for the Canadiens. Slafkovský finished the season with 20 goals and 50 points, and said it was "good because I didn't start great, but I know that I can still improve."

In advance of the 2024–25 season, the final year of his entry-level contract, Slafkovský agreed to an eight-year, $60.8 million extension with the Canadiens on 1 July 2024. After his strong finish to the previous season, there were raised expectations for his performance, but the 2024–25 campaign proved to be challenging. He was for a stretch of games taken off the team's top line, but eventually returned to playing with Suzuki and Caufield. With a two-point effort on 17 December versus the Buffalo Sabres, he assumed fourth place all-time for most points in Canadiens franchise history before the age of 21. The Canadiens would qualify for the 2025 Stanley Cup playoffs for the first time in Slafkovský's tenure, playing the Washington Capitals in the ensuing first round. On 25 April 2025, he scored his first NHL playoff goal.

Despite enjoying a much stronger start to the 2025–26 season than had been the case in the prior three seasons, Slafkovský was nonetheless removed from the team's top line in late November as a bid by head coach St. Louis to bolster the Canadiens' depth. Forming part of the second line with rookies Ivan Demidov and Oliver Kapanen, his points production increased as a result of this change, and he drew praise for his performance as a play-driving winger. Slafkovský was named the NHL's Third Star for the Week of 22–28 December, a span in which he had three goals and two assists in two games. Following the NHL's resumption of play after the 2026 Winter Olympics, Slafkovský was soon returned to the top line. On 9 April, he reached the 70-point mark for the first time in his career with an assist on linemate Caufield's 50th goal of the season, before scoring his own 30th goal in the final minute of the game to give the Canadiens a 2–1 victory over the Tampa Bay Lightning. He finished the regular season with 30 goals and 43 assists, for a new career high of 73 points in 82 games played. During the Canadiens' first round matchup against the Lightning in the 2026 Stanley Cup playoffs, he recorded his first career playoff hat-trick and game-winning goal, scoring in the second, third, and overtime period of game one on 19 April 2026. This was the first all-power play goals hat-trick in franchise postseason history, and only the 13th time in NHL history a player registered three power-play goals in a single playoff game.

== International play ==
Medal record

Men's ice hockey

Representing Slovakia

Winter Olympics
Bronze medal – third place	2022 Beijing	

Hlinka Gretzky Cup
Silver medal – second place	2021 Czech Republic/Slovakia	

Slafkovský debuted as part of his country's national team on both their under-20 and senior rosters, appearing at the 2021 World Junior Championships and the 2021 World Championship respectively. He then joined the under-18 team at the 2021 Hlinka Gretzky Cup, winning a silver medal.

The youngest player in the 2022 Winter Olympics tournament (as well as one of two teenagers included on Slovakia's roster, alongside Šimon Nemec), Slafkovský scored both of Slovakia's goals in the opening game against Finland, a 6–2 loss, becoming the first 17-year-old to score at the men's Olympic ice hockey ranks since Eddie Olczyk in 1984. He finished as top scorer with seven goals in seven games, leading Slovakia to a bronze medal, their first-ever Olympic medal in ice hockey. For his efforts, he was voted most valuable player of the tournament. He was later named to the 2022 World Championship, recording three goals and six assists in nine games. His exceptional play at the World Championship was later credited as further enhancing his profile ahead of the NHL draft. In recognition of his collective international performances in 2022, the Slovak Ice Hockey Federation named Slafkovský as the youngest ever recipient of its Player of the Year award. He was likewise named best forward and best under-20 player.

Following the 2023–24 NHL season, with the Canadiens failing to qualify for the 2024 Stanley Cup playoffs, Slafkovský joined Slovakia at the 2024 World Championship.

In June 2025, Slafkovský was named to the Slovakia roster ahead of the 2026 Winter Olympics held in Milan and Cortina d'Ampezzo, Italy. During the opening game of the tournament against Finland, he produced two goals and an assist in a 4–1 victory. After scoring another goal during Slovakia's game against Sweden, Slafkovský became the most recent men's player to score 10 goals in the Olympics before turning 22, and the first since 1948. Slovakia reached the third-place game for the second consecutive Olympic Games, this time losing to Finland. He was voted to the tournament All-Star Team for the second time, being the only player honoured not from Canada or the United States.

== Personal life ==
He is a second cousin of former competitive slalom canoeist Alexander Slafkovský.

== Career statistics ==
=== Regular season and playoffs ===
			Regular season					Playoffs
Season	Team	League	GP	G	A	Pts	PIM	GP	G	A	Pts	PIM
2019–20	TPS	FIN U18	39	22	30	52	36	—	—	—	—	—
2019–20	TPS	Jr. A	4	0	3	3	4	—	—	—	—	—
2020–21	TPS	FIN U18	1	2	0	2	0	—	—	—	—	—
2020–21	TPS	Jr. A	16	8	5	13	10	2	0	0	0	0
2021–22	TPS	Jr. A	11	6	12	18	6	—	—	—	—	—
2021–22	TPS	Liiga	31	5	5	10	33	18	2	5	7	8
2022–23	Montreal Canadiens	NHL	39	4	6	10	33	—	—	—	—	—
2023–24	Montreal Canadiens	NHL	82	20	30	50	55	—	—	—	—	—
2024–25	Montreal Canadiens	NHL	79	18	33	51	45	5	2	0	2	4
2025–26	Montreal Canadiens	NHL	82	30	43	73	52	19	6	6	12	9
Liiga totals			31	5	5	10	33	18	2	5	7	8
NHL totals			282	72	112	184	185	24	8	6	14	13

=== International ===
Year	Team	Event	Result	GP	G	A	Pts	PIM
2021	Slovakia	WJC	8th	5	0	0	0	2
2021	Slovakia	WC	8th	6	0	0	0	2
2021	Slovakia	HG18	2nd place, silver medalist(s)	5	3	6	9	8
2021	Slovakia	OGQ	Q	3	0	1	1	0
2022	Slovakia	OG	3rd place, bronze medalist(s)	7	7	0	7	0
2022	Slovakia	WC	8th	8	3	6	9	2
2024	Slovakia	WC	7th	8	0	8	8	8
2026	Slovakia	OG	4th	6	4	4	8	2
Junior totals				10	3	6	9	10
Senior totals				38	14	19	33	14

== Awards and honours ==
Award	Year	Ref
International
Winter Olympics All-Star Team	2022, 2026	
Winter Olympics MVP	2022	
National
Best Forward	2022, 2024, 2025	
Best U20 Player	2022, 2024	
Player of the Year	2022, 2024, 2025, 2026	

Awards and achievements
Preceded by Owen Power	NHL first overall draft pick 2022	Succeeded by Connor Bedard
Preceded by Logan Mailloux	Montreal Canadiens first-round draft pick 2022	Succeeded by Filip Mešár
