= Laval Rocket =

American Hockey League team in Laval, Quebec

Laval Rocket Rocket de Laval
- City: Laval, Quebec
- League: American Hockey League
- Conference: Eastern
- Division: North
- Founded: 1969
- Home arena: Place Bell (capacity: 10,062)
- Colours: Blue, white and red
- Mascot: Cosmo
- Owners: Molson family (majority owner) (Geoff Molson, chairman)
- General manager: John Sedgwick
- Head coach: Daniel Jacob
- Captain: Lucas Condotta
- Media: English: AHL.TV (Internet); TSN 690; French: RDS; 91.9 Sports
- Affiliates: Montreal Canadiens (NHL); Trois-Rivières Lions (ECHL)
- Website: rocketlaval.com

Franchise history
- 1969–1971: Montreal Voyageurs
- 1971–1984: Nova Scotia Voyageurs
- 1984–1990: Sherbrooke Canadiens
- 1990–1999: Fredericton Canadiens
- 1999–2002: Quebec Citadelles
- 2002–2015: Hamilton Bulldogs
- 2015–2017: St. John's IceCaps
- 2017–present: Laval Rocket

Championships
- Regular season titles: 1 (2024–25)
- Division titles: 3 (2020–21, 2024–25), 2025–26)

The Laval Rocket (French: Rocket de Laval) are a professional ice hockey team based in Laval, Quebec. They are the American Hockey League (AHL) affiliate of the Montreal Canadiens of the National Hockey League (NHL) and Trois-Rivières Lions of the ECHL. The Rocket play their home games at Place Bell.

== History ==
In July 2016, American Hockey League (AHL) executives announced that they had unanimously approved the relocation of the St. John's IceCaps, AHL affiliate of the Montreal Canadiens, to the Montreal suburb of Laval for the 2017–18 season. Shortly thereafter, a name-the-team contest was held with Patriots, Rapids and Rocket narrowed as the final three candidates. On September 8, the winning name of Laval Rocket was announced, a tribute to Canadiens' legend Maurice "Rocket" Richard, which got a 51% majority of fan votes. With this, Laval became the second hockey team in the Greater Montreal area to use that nickname, after the Montreal Rocket of the Quebec Major Junior Hockey League (QMJHL), from 1999 until 2003. In June 2017, the franchise named Larry Carriere as general manager and retained Sylvain Lefebvre as head coach, a position he held since 2012 when the franchise played as the Hamilton Bulldogs and St. John's IceCaps respectively.

During their inaugural campaign, Laval compiled a dismal 24–42–7–3 record, placing them last overall in league standings. As a result, Lefebvre would be relieved as head coach and replaced by Joël Bouchard, who himself had been serving as head coach and general manager of the Blainville-Boisbriand Armada in the QMJHL.

For the 2020–21 season, the Rocket temporarily relocated to the Bell Centre in Montreal to share the facility with their parent team during the COVID-19 pandemic. The Rocket finished as Canadian Division champions and posted the second-best winning percentage across the AHL, with their opponents limited to only Canada-based teams due to the ongoing pandemic.

With Bouchard leaving at the end of his contract (compiling an 83–67–24 record over the course of three seasons) to become the head coach of the San Diego Gulls, the Rocket hired Jean-François Houle as their third head coach until the foregoing's departure in June 2024. Weeks later, on July 16, Lavallois Pascal Vincent was named as the fourth head coach in franchise history. Vincent's impact on the team was instantaneous, with the Rocket posting a franchise record seven consecutive wins to begin the 2024–25 season. The team would have their best season in franchise history, winning the Macgregor Kilpatrick Trophy as AHL regular season champions for the first time, as well as their second divisional title.

== Team information ==
=== Logos and uniforms ===
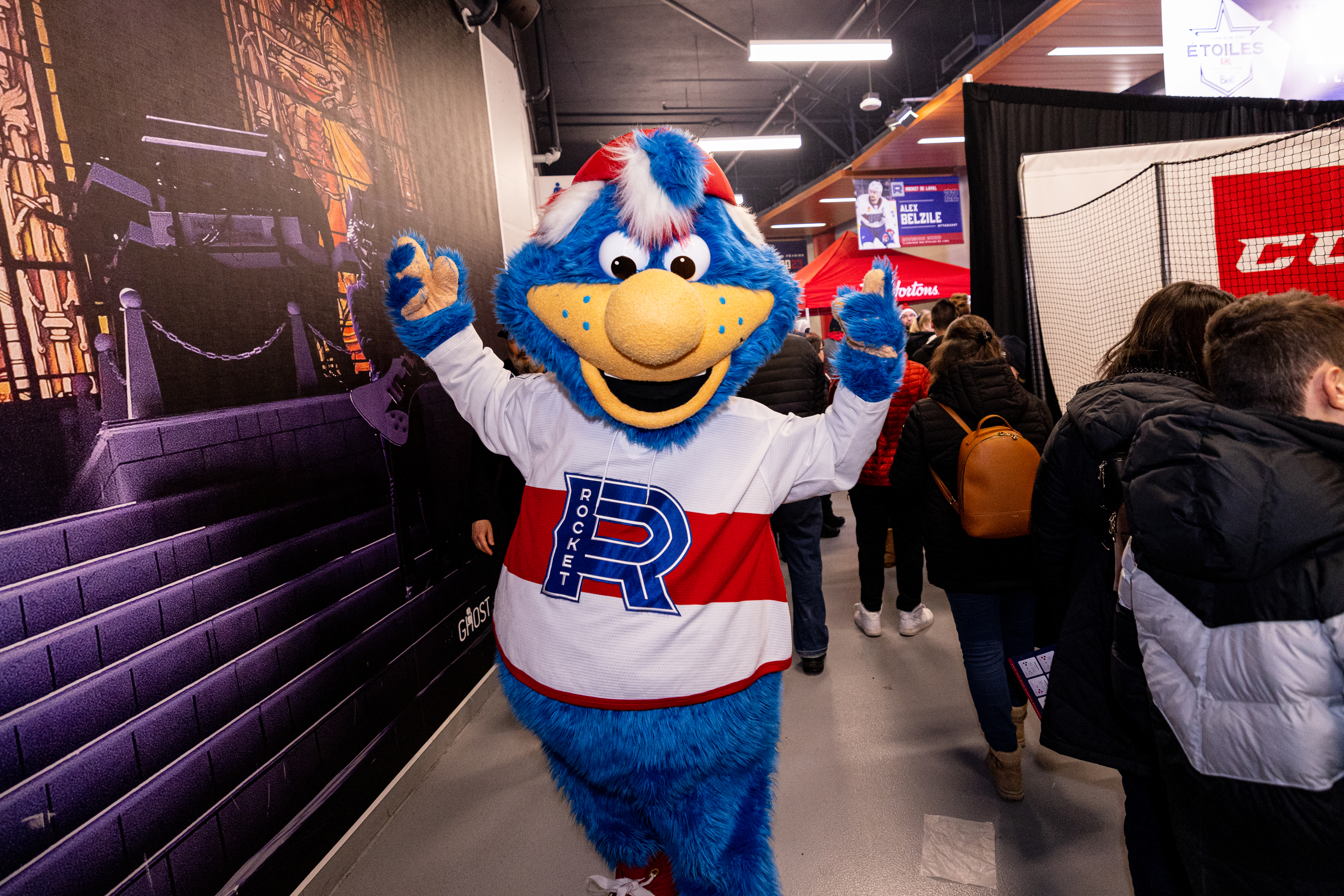
Team mascot Cosmo at the 2023 AHL All-Star Game

On January 31, 2017, the team revealed the logo and jersey design that would be worn during their inaugural season. The colours consist of blue, white, and red and were chosen to mirror those of their parent-club, the Montreal Canadiens. As a further tribute to Richard's "Rocket" moniker, each sleeve has a shield patch with 'Le Rocket' inscribed therein. Similarly, patches with the number 9 and a stylized flame appear on each sleeve whereas the latter can also be found below the player's number on the backside of the jersey as well as their hockey socks. Laval, being the name of the city in which the Rocket play out of, is displayed on each shoulder as well as in the neck tie region of the jersey.

The main logo is a large blue 'R' that is outlined and highlighted in white. The word 'Rocket' runs along the inside of the 'R' in white. While all other logos and patches alternate colours depending on the home or away jersey, the main logo remains blue on both the red and white jerseys.

In January 2025, the team introduced a retro jersey concept which pays homage to former Ligue Nord-Américaine de Hockey (LNAH) franchise the Laval Chiefs, as well as past iterations of major junior teams in the area, namely the National, who rebranded as the Voisins and Titan between 1979 and 1985.

== Season-by-season results ==
Regular season											Playoffs					
Season	Games	Won	Lost	OTL	SOL	Points	PCT	Goals for	Goals against	Standing	Year	Prelims	1st round	2nd round	3rd round	Finals
2017–18	76	24	42	7	3	58	.382	206	281	7th, North	2018	Did not qualify				
2018–19	76	30	34	6	6	72	.474	195	231	7th, North	2019	Did not qualify				
2019–20	62	30	24	5	3	68	.548	183	182	6th, North	2020	Season cancelled due to the COVID-19 pandemic				
2020–21	36	23	9	3	1	50	.694	113	87	1st, Canadian	2021	No playoffs held^{1}				
2021–22	72	39	26	5	2	85	.590	246	231	3rd, North	2022	BYE^{2}	W, 3–2, SYR	W, 3–0, ROC	L, 3–4, SPR	—
2022–23	72	33	29	7	3	76	.528	258	247	5th, North	2023	L, 0–2, UTI	—	—	—	—
2023–24	72	33	31	6	2	74	.514	235	242	7th, North	2024	Did not qualify				
2024–25	72	48	19	3	2	101	.701	229	178	1st, North	2025	BYE^{2}	W, 3–1, CLE	W, 3–2, ROC	L, 0–4, CHA	—
2025–26	72	41	23	3	5	90	.625	233	200	1st, North	2026	BYE^{2}	L, 2–3, TOR	—	—	—

Notes

1. The league allowed each division the choice to hold a divisional postseason. On April 29, 2021, it was announced that only the Pacific Division had elected to hold a postseason tournament to name a division champion, with the other four divisions awarding their champions via regular season records. Consequently, the league would not award the Calder Cup for a second consecutive season.
2. Beginning in 2022, the top two teams in the Atlantic, top three teams in each of the North and Central, and the first-place team in the Pacific Division received byes into the division semifinals of the Calder Cup playoffs.

== Players and personnel ==
=== Current roster ===
Updated October 22, 2026

No.	Nat	Player	Pos	S/G	Age	Acquired	Birthplace	Contract
18	(Canada)	Vincent Arseneau	LW	L	34	2024	Îles-de-la-Madeleine, Quebec	Rocket
22	(Canada)	Alex Belzile (A)	RW	R	35	2025	Saint-Éloi, Quebec	Canadiens
19	(United States)	Dillan Bentley	F	R	25	2026	Peoria, Illinois	Rocket
6	(United States)	Brett Berard	LW	L	24	2026	East Greenwich, Rhode Island	Canadiens
42	(Canada)	Lucas Condotta (C)	LW	L	28	2022	Georgetown, Ontario	Canadiens
27	(Canada)	Laurent Dauphin (A)	C	L	31	2024	Repentigny, Quebec	Rocket
49	(Canada)	Jared Davidson	C	L	24	2023	Edmonton, Alberta	Canadiens
28	(United States)	Aiden Dubinsky	D	R	22	2026	Highland Park, Illinois	Rocket
25	(Canada)	Braden Hache	D	L	23	2026	Manchester, New Hampshire	Rocket
34	(Finland)	Kaapo Kahkonen	G	L	30	2025	Helsinki, Finland	Canadiens
31	(Canada)	Kevin Mandolese	G	L	26	2026	Blainville, Quebec	Rocket
41	(United States)	Hunter McKown	C	R	24	2026	San Jose, California	Canadiens
48	(Slovakia)	Filip Mesar	RW	R	22	2022	Spišská Belá, Slovakia	Canadiens
24	(Canada)	Israel Mianscum	LW	L	23	2024	Mistissini, Quebec	Rocket
3	(United States)	Luke Mittelstadt	D	L	23	2026	Eden Prairie, Minnesota	Canadiens
20	(Canada)	Josh Nadeau	F	L	23	2026	St-François-de-Madawaska, New Brunswick	Rocket
36	(United States)	Sasha Pastujov	LW	L	23	2026	Bradenton, Florida	Canadiens
88	(Canada)	Sam Poulin	F	L	25	2026	Blainville, Quebec	Canadiens
12	(Canada)	Owen Protz	D	L	20	2026	Ottawa, Ontario	Canadiens
64	(Austria)	David Reinbacher	D	R	21	2024	Hohenems, Austria	Canadiens
4	(Canada)	Ethan Samson	D	R	23	2026	Delta, British Columbia	Canadiens
81	(Canada)	Xavier Simoneau	C	R	25	2022	Saint-André-Avellin, Quebec	Rocket
55	(Germany)	Maksymilian Szuber	D	L	24	2026	Opole, Poland	Canadiens
11	(Canada)	Tyler Thorpe	RW	R	21	2025	Richmond, British Columbia	Canadiens
44	(United States)	Reilly Walsh	D	R	27	2026	Framingham, Massachusetts	Canadiens

=== Team captains ===
- Byron Froese, 2017–19
- Xavier Ouellet, 2019–22
- Alex Belzile, 2022–23
- Gabriel Bourque, 2023–24
- Lucas Condotta, 2024–present

=== Head coaches ===
- Sylvain Lefebvre, 2017–18
- Joel Bouchard, 2018–21
- Jean-Francois Houle, 2021–24
- Pascal Vincent, 2024–26

=== Notable alumni ===
The following players have played both 100 games with Laval and 100 games in the National Hockey League:

- Gabriel Bourque
- Jake Evans
- Michael McCarron
- Xavier Ouellet
- Michael Pezzetta
- Jesse Ylonen
