= 2013–14 HC Slovan Bratislava season =

2013–14 HC Slovan Bratislava
- Division: 6th Bobrov
- Conference: 11th Western
- 2013–14 record: 15–9–4–26
- Home record: 8–6–2–11
- Road record: 7–3–2–15
- Goals for: 120
- Goals against: 160

Team information
- General manager: (Slovakia) Maroš Krajči
- Coach: (Czech Republic) Rostislav Čada
- Assistant coach: (Slovakia) Roman Stantien (Slovakia) Ján Lipiansky
- Captain: (Slovakia) Milan Bartovič
- Alternate captains: (Slovakia) Mário Bližňák (Oct–Mar) (Slovakia) Roman Kukumberg (Sep–Oct) (Slovakia) Michal Sersen
- Arena: Slovnaft Arena
- Average attendance: 10,013 (99.58%) ▲

Team leaders
- Goals: (Slovakia) Michel Miklík (14)
- Assists: (Slovakia) Michel Miklík (18)
- Points: (Slovakia) Michel Miklík (32)
- Penalty minutes: (Czech Republic) Tomáš Mojžíš (71)
- Plus/minus: (Slovakia) Milan Bartovič (+2)
- Wins: (Slovakia) Jaroslav Janus (15)
- Goals against average: (Czech Republic) Miroslav Kopřiva (2.62)

The 2013–14 HC Slovan Bratislava season was the second season for the club in the Kontinental Hockey League (KHL).

== Schedule and results ==
=== Preseason and friendly games ===
Pre-season took part in July, August and September with 3 friendly matches and participating European Trophy. The training session started on 11 July 2013. In addition, Slovan played two friendly games against Kometa Brno during the olympic break.

2013–14 Game Log
Pre-season: 2–1–0–0 (Home: 1–1–0–0; Road: 1–0–0–0)

#	Date	Home team	Score	Away team	Arena	Attendance	Recap
1	25 July	(Czech Republic) Slavia Praha	1 – 2	Slovan Bratislava	Eden	1,124	
2	1 August	Slovan Bratislava	2 – 0	Spartak Moscow (Russia)	Slovnaft Arena	10,055	
3	8 August	Slovan Bratislava	2 – 1 OT	Torpedo Nizhny Novgorod (Russia)	Slovnaft Arena	10,055	

European Trophy: 5–0–1–2 (Home: 4–0–0–0; Road: 1–0–1–2) Pts. 16

#	Date	Home team	Score	Away team	Arena	Attendance	Record	Recap
1	9 August	Slovan Bratislava	6 – 2	Vienna Capitals (Austria)	Slovnaft Arena	7,616	1–0–0–0	
2	13 August	(Czech Republic) Sparta Praha	3 – 2 SO	Slovan Bratislava	Slovnaft Arena (Note: Sparta played officially at home, however had met half-way Slovan's request for relocating the match.)	10,055	1–0–1–0	
3	15 August	Slovan Bratislava	5 – 3	Piráti Chomutov (Czech Republic)	Slovnaft Arena	9,945	2–0–1–0	
4	17 August	(Austria) Vienna Capitals	4 – 1	Slovan Bratislava	Albert-Schultz Eishalle	3,130	2–0–1–1	
5	23 August	(Finland) JYP Jyväskylä	3 – 4	Slovan Bratislava	Synergia-areena	2,682	3–0–1–1	
6	24 August	(Finland) KalPa	4 – 2	Slovan Bratislava	Trust Kapital Areena	2,099	3–0–1–2	
7	30 August	Slovan Bratislava	4 – 2	Linköpings (Sweden)	Hant Aréna (Note: The match was moved to Skalica due to an exposition at the Slovnaft Arena.)	1,875	4–0–1–2	
8	1 September	Slovan Bratislava	7 – 4	HV71 (Sweden)	Easton Arena (Note: The match was moved to Piešťany due to an exposition at the Slovnaft Arena.)	2,167	5–0–1–2	

Friendly: 0–1–1–0 (Home: 0–0–1–0; Road: 0–1–0–0)

#	Date	Home team	Score	Away team	Arena	Attendance	Recap
1	14 February	Slovan Bratislava	2 – 3 SO	Kometa Brno (Czech Republic)	Slovnaft Arena	3,076	
2	20 February	(Czech Republic) Kometa Brno	2 – 3 SO	Slovan Bratislava	Kajot Arena	4,798	

Win (3 points) Overtime/shootout win (2 points) Overtime/shootout loss (1 point) Loss (0 points)

=== Regular season ===
2013–14 Game Log
September: 1–2–0–7 (Home: 0–1–0–3; Road: 1–1–0–4) Pts. 7

#	Date	Home team	Score	Away team	Arena	Attendance	Record	Recap
1	6	(Ukraine) Donbass Donetsk	4 – 2	Slovan Bratislava	Druzhba Arena	3,756	0–0–0–1	
2	8	Spartak Moscow	5 – 0	Slovan Bratislava	LDS Sokolniki	2,931	0–0–0–2	
3	10	(Belarus) Dinamo Minsk	2 – 0	Slovan Bratislava	Minsk-Arena	8,460	0–0–0–3	
4	13	(Croatia) Medveščak Zagreb	3 – 4 OT	Slovan Bratislava	Dom Sportova	6,500	0–1–0–3	
5	17	Slovan Bratislava	0 – 3	Torpedo Nizhny Novgorod	Slovnaft Arena	10,055	0–1–0–4	
6	19	Slovan Bratislava	1 – 4	Vityaz Podolsk	Slovnaft Arena	10,055	0–1–0–5	
7	21	Slovan Bratislava	2 – 1 OT	Ak Bars Kazan	Slovnaft Arena	9,702	0–2–0–5	
8	23	Slovan Bratislava	4 – 5	Dynamo Moscow	Slovnaft Arena	10,055	0–2–0–6	
9	27	Sibir Novosibirsk	3 – 1	Slovan Bratislava	Ice Sports Palace Sibir	6,000	0–2–0–7	
10	29	Metallurg Novokuznetsk	1 – 3	Slovan Bratislava	Sports Palace	3,275	1–2–0–7	

October: 4–2–0–5 (Home: 2–2–0–2; Road: 2–0–0–3) Pts. 16

#	Date	Home team	Score	Away team	Arena	Attendance	Record	Recap
11	1	Amur Khabarovsk	2 – 5	Slovan Bratislava	Platinum Arena	7,000	2–2–0–7	
12	3	Admiral Vladivostok	3 – 1	Slovan Bratislava	Fetisov Arena	5,500	2–2–0–8	
13	9	Slovan Bratislava	4 – 3 OT	Metallurg Magnitogorsk	Slovnaft Arena	9,605	2–3–0–8	
14	11	Slovan Bratislava	2 – 1 SO	Salavat Yulaev Ufa	Slovnaft Arena	10,055	2–4–0–8	
15	13	Slovan Bratislava	6 – 5	Traktor Chelyabinsk	Slovnaft Arena	10,055	3–4–0–8	
16	15	Slovan Bratislava	5 – 2	Lev Praha (Czech Republic)	Slovnaft Arena	10,055	4–4–0–8	
17	17	Slovan Bratislava	3 – 4	Dinamo Riga (Latvia)	Slovnaft Arena	10,055	4–4–0–9	
18	21	Slovan Bratislava	2 – 3	CSKA Moscow	Slovnaft Arena	10,055	4–4–0–10	
19	26	Severstal Cherepovets	2 – 0	Slovan Bratislava	Ice Palace	4,250	4–4–0–11	
20	28	Lokomotiv Yaroslavl	2 – 1	Slovan Bratislava	Arena 2000	7,716	4–4–0–12	
21	30	Atlant Mytishchi	0 – 1	Slovan Bratislava	Mytishchi Arena	5,200	5–4–0–12	

November: 2–2–0–5 (Home: 2–1–0–1; Road: 0–1–0–4) Pts. 10

#	Date	Home team	Score	Away team	Arena	Attendance	Record	Recap
22	1	SKA Saint Petersburg	4 – 2	Slovan Bratislava	Ice Palace	12,300	5–4–0–13	
23	13	Slovan Bratislava	3 – 2 SO	Yugra Khanty-Mansiysk	Slovnaft Arena	9,731	5–5–0–13	
24	15	Slovan Bratislava	3 – 1	Avtomobilist Yekaterinburg	Slovnaft Arena	10,055	6–5–0–13	
25	17	Slovan Bratislava	2 – 6	Barys Astana (Kazakhstan)	Slovnaft Arena	10,055	6–5–0–14	
26	19	Slovan Bratislava	3 – 1	Avangard Omsk	Slovnaft Arena	10,055	7–5–0–14	
27	22	Yugra Khanty-Mansiysk	0 – 1 SO	Slovan Bratislava	Arena Ugra	2,600	7–6–0–14	
28	24	Avtomobilist Yekaterinburg	8 – 1	Slovan Bratislava	KRK Uralets	5,500	7–6–0–15	
29	26	(Kazakhstan) Barys Astana	6 – 1	Slovan Bratislava	Kazakhstan Sports Palace	4,002	7–6–0–16	
30	28	Avangard Omsk	4 – 2	Slovan Bratislava	Omsk Arena	6,780	7–6–0–17	

December: 5–0–2–1 (Home: 3–0–2–0; Road: 2–0–0–1) Pts. 17

#	Date	Home team	Score	Away team	Arena	Attendance	Record	Recap
31	2	Slovan Bratislava	3 – 2	Severstal Cherepovets	Slovnaft Arena	10,055	8–6–0–17	
32	4	Slovan Bratislava	2 – 3 SO	SKA Saint Petersburg	Slovnaft Arena	10,055	8–6–1–17	
33	8	Slovan Bratislava	5 – 3	Lokomotiv Yaroslavl	Slovnaft Arena	10,055	9–6–1–17	
34	9 (Note: The match was originally scheduled on 6 December. It was rescheduled due to the fully occupied Slovnaft Arena.)	Slovan Bratislava	1 – 2 SO	Atlant Mytishchi	Slovnaft Arena	10,055	9–6–2–17	
35	13	CSKA Moscow	4 – 5	Slovan Bratislava	CSKA Ice Palace	3,247	10–6–2–17	
36	15	(Czech Republic) Lev Praha	7 – 0	Slovan Bratislava	Tipsport Arena	12,864	10–6–2–18	
37	27	Slovan Bratislava	4 – 2	Neftekhimik Nizhnekamsk	Slovnaft Arena	10,055	11–6–2–18	
38	29	(Latvia) Dinamo Riga	1 – 3	Slovan Bratislava	Arena Riga	10,100	12–6–2–18	

January: 3–2–2–5 (Home: 1–1–0–2; Road: 2–1–2–3) Pts. 15

#	Date	Home team	Score	Away team	Arena	Attendance	Record	Recap
39	3	Metallurg Magnitogorsk	6 – 2	Slovan Bratislava	Magnitogorsk Arena	7,500	12–6–2–19	
40	5	Traktor Chelyabinsk	2 – 1	Slovan Bratislava	Traktor Sport Palace	7,000	12–6–2–20	
41	7	Neftekhimik Nizhnekamsk	4 – 3 OT	Slovan Bratislava	SCC Arena	4,000	12–6–3–20	
42	9	Salavat Yulaev Ufa	4 – 2	Slovan Bratislava	Ufa Arena	7,710	12–6–3–21	
43	13	Slovan Bratislava	2 – 1 SO	Sibir Novosibirsk	Slovnaft Arena	10,055	12–7–3–21	
44	15	Slovan Bratislava	3 – 2	Amur Khabarovsk	Slovnaft Arena	10,055	13–7–3–21	
45	17	Slovan Bratislava	1 – 6	Admiral Vladivostok	Slovnaft Arena	10,055	13–7–3–22	
46	19	Slovan Bratislava	2 – 3	Metallurg Novokuznetsk	Slovnaft Arena	10,055	13–7–3–23	
47	22	Ak Bars Kazan	2 – 1 SO	Slovan Bratislava	TatNeft Arena	3,639	13–7–4–23	
48	24	Torpedo Nizhny Novgorod	2 – 3	Slovan Bratislava	Trade Union Sport Palace	5,500	14–7–4–23	
49	26	Vityaz Podolsk	1 – 2 SO	Slovan Bratislava	Podolsk Hero Arena	4,600	14–8–4–23	
50	28	Dynamo Moscow	2 – 3	Slovan Bratislava	Minor Arena	5,256	15–8–4–23	

February: 0–1–0–1 (Home: 0–1–0–1; Road: 0–0–0–0) Pts. 2

#	Date	Home team	Score	Away team	Arena	Attendance	Record	Recap
51	26	Slovan Bratislava	4 – 3 SO	Dinamo Minsk (Belarus)	Slovnaft Arena	10,055	15–9–4–23	
52	28	Slovan Bratislava	1 – 2	Donbass Donetsk (Ukraine)	Slovnaft Arena	10,055	15–9–4–24	

March: 0–0–0–2 (Home: 0–0–0–2; Road: 0–0–0–0) Pts. 0

#	Date	Home team	Score	Away team	Arena	Attendance	Record	Recap
53	2	Slovan Bratislava	0 – 3	Spartak Moscow	Slovnaft Arena	10,055	15–9–4–25	
54	4	Slovan Bratislava	2 – 3	Medveščak Zagreb (Croatia)	Slovnaft Arena	10,055	15–9–4–26	

Win (3 points) Overtime/shootout win (2 points) Overtime/shootout loss (1 point) Loss (0 points)

=== Nadezhda Cup ===
Nadezhda Cup is a post-season tournament for teams that did not qualify for the Play-offs. In the qualification round, the teams play a series of two games with the possibility of a tie. In case of a tie after the two games, a short Overtime and penalty shootout will follow.

2014 Nadezhda Cup
Qualification Round vs. (14) Dinamo Minsk – Dinamo won the series 2–0

#	Date	Home team	Score	Away team	Arena	Attendance	Series	Recap
1	7 March	(Belarus) Dinamo Minsk	1 – 0	Slovan Bratislava	Babruysk Arena	5,000	0–0–1	
2	10 March	Slovan Bratislava	1 – 2	(Belarus) Dinamo Minsk	Slovnaft Arena	6,085	0–0–2	

Win Tie Loss

== Standings ==
Source: khl.ru
After games of 4 March 2014

=== Bobrov Division ===
R		GP	W	OTW	SOW	SOL	OTL	L	GF	GA	Pts
1	(Russia) SKA Saint Petersburg	54	30	1	4	4	1	14	175	115	105
2	(Czech Republic) Lev Praha	54	23	3	9	2	4	13	149	107	99
3	(Latvia) Dinamo Riga	54	22	5	6	4	1	16	141	122	93
4	(Croatia) Medveščak Zagreb	54	24	1	3	8	4	14	138	126	92
5	(Russia) CSKA Moscow	54	25	2	5	1	1	20	130	118	91
6	(Slovakia) Slovan Bratislava	54	15	3	6	3	1	26	120	160	67
7	(Belarus) Dinamo Minsk	54	13	1	3	4	2	31	102	161	53

=== Western Conference ===
R		Div	GP	W	OTW	SOW	SOL	OTL	L	GF	GA	Pts
1	(Russia) Dynamo Moscow *	TAR	54	34	2	2	5	0	11	171	113	115
2	(Russia) SKA Saint Petersburg *	BOB	54	30	1	4	4	1	14	175	115	105
3	(Czech Republic) Lev Praha	BOB	54	23	3	9	2	4	13	149	107	99
4	(Ukraine) Donbass Donetsk	TAR	54	27	3	4	2	0	18	135	99	97
5	(Latvia) Dinamo Riga	BOB	54	22	5	6	4	1	16	141	122	93
6	(Croatia) Medveščak Zagreb	BOB	54	24	1	3	8	4	14	138	126	92
7	(Russia) CSKA Moscow	BOB	54	25	2	5	1	1	20	130	118	91
8	(Russia) Lokomotiv Yaroslavl	TAR	54	23	2	3	4	1	21	109	103	84
9	(Russia) Atlant Mytishchi	TAR	54	19	1	7	3	2	22	123	120	78
10	(Russia) Severstal Cherepovets	TAR	54	20	0	5	5	2	22	128	135	77
11	(Slovakia) Slovan Bratislava	BOB	54	15	3	6	3	1	26	120	160	67
12	(Russia) Spartak Moscow	TAR	54	12	4	4	4	2	28	105	147	58
13	(Russia) Vityaz Podolsk	TAR	54	12	1	5	9	1	26	110	147	58
14	(Belarus) Dinamo Minsk	BOB	54	13	1	3	4	2	31	102	161	53

*– Division leader;
BOB – Bobrov Division, TAR – Tarasov Division

== Final roster ==
Source: hcslovan.sk
As of 10 March 2013

No.	Nat	Player	Pos	S/G	Age	Acquired	Birthplace
83	(Slovakia)	Martin Bakoš	LW	R	36	2007	Spišská Nová Ves, Czechoslovakia
61	(Slovakia)	Milan Bartovič (C)	LW	L	45	2012	Trenčín, Czechoslovakia
55	(Slovakia)	Mário Bližňák (A)	C	L	39	2012	Trenčín, Czechoslovakia
91	(Slovakia)	Ján Brejčák	D	L	37	2013	Poprad, Czechoslovakia
30	(Slovakia)	Denis Godla	G	L	31	2013	Kežmarok, Slovakia
90	(Slovakia)	Libor Hudáček	C	R	35	2009	Levoča, Czechoslovakia
32	(Slovakia)	Jaroslav Janus	G	L	36	2012	Prešov, Czechoslovakia
1	(Czech Republic)	Miroslav Kopřiva	G	L	42	2013	Kladno, Czechoslovakia
72	(Slovakia)	Lukáš Kozák	D	L	34	2011	Martin, Czechoslovakia
23	(Slovakia)	Andrej Kudrna	LW	L	35	2011	Nové Zámky, Czechoslovakia
16	(Slovakia)	Roman Kukumberg	C	R	46	2011	Bratislava, Czechoslovakia
4	(Slovakia)	Patrik Luža	D	R	32	2011	Bratislava, Slovakia
56	(Slovakia)	Vladimír Mihálik	D	L	39	2012	Prešov, Czechoslovakia
19	(Slovakia)	Michel Miklík	LW	L	44	2012	Piešťany, Czechoslovakia
71	(Slovakia)	Juraj Mikúš	C	R	39	2013	Skalica, Czechoslovakia
13	(Slovakia)	Tomáš Mikúš	RW	L	33	2012	Skalica, Slovakia
6	(Czech Republic)	Tomáš Mojžíš	D	R	44	2013	Piešťany, Czechoslovakia
25	(Slovakia)	Bruno Mráz	C	L	33	2012	Bratislava, Slovakia
85	(Slovakia)	Peter Ölvecký	LW	L	40	2012	Nové Zámky, Czechoslovakia
92	(Slovakia)	Branko Radivojevič	RW	R	45	2013	Piešťany, Czechoslovakia
8	(Slovakia)	Michal Sersen (A)	D	L	40	2012	Gelnica, Czechoslovakia
5	(Canada)	Jonathan Sigalet	D	L	40	2012	Vancouver, British Columbia
18	(Slovakia)	Miroslav Šatan	C	L	51	2011	Topoľčany, Czechoslovakia
41	(Czech Republic)	Martin Škoula	D	L	46	2013	Litoměřice, Czechoslovakia
3	(Slovakia)	Martin Štajnoch	D	R	35	2008	Bojnice, Czechoslovakia
59	(Slovakia)	Andrej Šťastný	C	L	35	2012	Považská Bystrica, Czechoslovakia
82	(Czech Republic)	Michal Vondrka	RW	L	44	2012	České Budějovice, Czechoslovakia

== Player statistics ==
Source: khl.ru
Updated as of 10 March 2013.

=== Skaters ===
Regular season
Player	GP	G	A	Pts	+/-	PIM
Michel Miklík	54	14	18	32	−7	10
Milan Bartovič	54	13	15	28	2	46
Michal Vondrka	48	12	12	24	−10	18
Libor Hudáček	54	5	11	16	−20	14
Juraj Mikúš	47	7	8	15	−3	28
Peter Ölvecký	49	4	11	15	−5	36
Tomáš Netík	32	11	3	14	−7	12
Michal Sersen	33	3	11	14	−5	28
Tomáš Mojžíš	50	5	8	13	−2	71
Martin Škoula	54	2	11	13	−17	18
Miroslav Šatan	23	9	3	12	−5	8
Andrej Šťastný	39	4	6	10	−5	30
Jonathan Sigalet	52	1	9	10	−14	30
Martin Bakoš	31	5	4	9	−6	0
Mário Bližňák	45	5	4	9	−12	28
Branko Radivojevič	31	3	5	8	−2	22
Martin Štajnoch	49	2	6	8	−11	40
Roman Kukumberg	34	3	2	5	−11	14
Marko Daňo	41	3	2	5	−11	41
Vladimír Mihálik	38	2	3	5	−12	20
Zdeněk Kutlák	30	0	3	3	−11	10
Tomáš Mikúš	30	1	1	2	−8	18
Ján Brejčák	20	0	2	2	−3	14
Patrik Luža	0	0	0	0	0	0
Andrej Kudrna	1	0	0	0	0	0
Bruno Mráz	5	0	0	0	−2	0
Marek Trončinský	6	0	0	0	−5	4
Richard Mráz	8	0	0	0	−3	0
Milan Kolena	9	0	0	0	−8	0
Tomáš Matoušek	24	0	0	0	−2	17

Nadezhda Cup
Player	GP	G	A	Pts	+/-	PIM
Miroslav Šatan	2	1	0	1	−1	0
Branko Radivojevič	2	0	1	1	0	0
Tomáš Mojžíš	2	0	1	1	−1	6
Lukáš Kozák	0	0	0	0	0	0
Bruno Mráz	0	0	0	0	0	0
Milan Bartovič	1	0	0	0	0	0
Peter Ölvecký	1	0	0	0	0	0
Martin Bakoš	2	0	0	0	0	0
Libor Hudáček	2	0	0	0	0	0
Roman Kukumberg	2	0	0	0	0	0
Tomáš Mikúš	2	0	0	0	0	0
Vladimír Mihálik	2	0	0	0	0	2
Andrej Šťastný	2	0	0	0	0	2
Juraj Mikúš	2	0	0	0	−1	0
Martin Škoula	2	0	0	0	−1	0
Martin Štajnch	2	0	0	0	−1	0
Patrik Luža	2	0	0	0	−1	2
Mário Bližnák	2	0	0	0	−2	0
Jonathan Sigalet	2	0	0	0	−2	0
Michel Miklík	2	0	0	0	−3	0
Michal Vondrka	2	0	0	0	−3	0

=== Goaltenders ===
Regular season
Player	GP	W	L	SOP	SOG	GA	SV	SV%	GAA	G	A	SO	PIM	TOI
Miroslav Kopřiva	17	3	9	1	412	38	374	90.8	2.62	0	0	0	12	871:02
Jaroslav Janus	41	15	18	8	1127	115	1012	89.8	2.86	0	0	2	4	2411:23

Nadezhda Cup
Player	GP	W	L	SOP	SOG	GA	SV	SV%	GAA	G	A	SO	PIM	TOI
Jaroslav Janus	1	0	0	0	27	1	26	96.3	1.01	0	0	0	4	59:12
Miroslav Kopřiva	1	0	1	0	24	1	23	95.8	1.02	0	0	0	0	58:56

== Milestones and team statistics ==
=== Team milestones ===
Milestone	Date	Reached
100th KHL Team Point	30 Oct 2013	Atlant Mytishchi 0 – 1 HC Slovan Bratislava
200th KHL Team Goal	9 Dec 2013	Milan Bartovič 1 – 0 (HC Slovan Bratislava 1 – 2 SO Atlant Mytishchi)
100th KHL Team Match	24 Jan 2014	Torpedo Nizhny Novgorod 2 – 3 HC Slovan Bratislava

=== Team statistics ===
All statistics are for regular season only.

Statistic	Value
Matches played	54
Total points	67
Record	15–9–4–26
Score	120 – 160
Biggest win	5 – 2 (Round 11 vs. Amur Khabarovsk & Round 16 vs. Lev Praha)
Biggest defeat	0 – 7 (Round 36 vs. Lev Praha); 1 – 8 (Round 28 vs. Avtomobilist Yekaterinburg)
Shots on goal %	8.16% (120/1471)
Shutouts	2
Penalty in minutes	613
Powerplay %	15.7% (31/197)
Penalty killing	85.2% (196/230)
Average attendance	10,013
Number of sold-out home games	24
Most consecutive wins (Note: Regular time wins.)	2 (Round 10 – Round 11 & Round 15 – Round 16 & Round 37 – Round 38)
Most consecutive wins + overtime wins	4 (Round 13 – Round 16)
Most consecutive undefeated matches (Note: Games without a regular time loss.)	5 (Round 31 – Round 35 & Round 47 – Round 51)
Most consecutive losses (Note: Regular time losses)	4 (Round 17 – Round 20)
Most consecutive losses + overtime losses	4 (Round 17 – Round 20 & Round 39 – Round 42)
Most consecutive matches without a win (Note: Games without a regular time win.)	9 (Round 1 – Round 9)
Longest time between scored goals	151:11 (Round 1 – Round 4)
Longest time without a conceded goal	121:22 (Round 20 – Round 22)

Notes

=== Player milestones ===
Milestone	Player	Date	Opponent
100th Career KHL Match	(Canada) Jonathan Sigalet	19 Sep 2013	Vityaz Podolsk
100th Career KHL Match	(Slovakia) Michal Sersen	29 Sep 2013	Metallurg Novokuznetsk
50th Career KHL Point	(Czech Republic) Martin Škoula	1 Nov 2013	SKA Saint Petersburg
100th Career KHL Match	(Slovakia) Milan Bartovič	28 Nov 2013	Avangard Omsk
50th Career KHL Point	(Slovakia) Michel Miklík	13 Dec 2013	CSKA Moscow
100th Career KHL Match	(Czech Republic) Tomáš Mojžíš	9 Jan 2014	Salavat Yulaev Ufa
100th Career KHL Match	(Slovakia) Michel Miklík	24 Jan 2014	Torpedo Nizhny Novgorod
50th Career KHL Point	(Slovakia) Milan Bartovič	24 Jan 2014	Torpedo Nizhny Novgorod
100th Career KHL Match	(Slovakia) Peter Ölvecký	26 Jan 2014	Vityaz Podolsk
100th Career KHL Match	(Slovakia) Libor Hudáček	28 Feb 2014	Donbass Donetsk

== Roster changes ==
=== Transactions ===
Source: EuroHockey.com

Date	Player	Moved from	Moved to	Contract terms
8 May 2013	(Slovakia) Ján Brejčák	(Czech Republic) HC Litvínov	–	2 years
21 May 2013	(Czech Republic) Miroslav Kopřiva	(Czech Republic) HC Slavia Praha	–	1 year
8 July 2013	(Slovakia) Richard Mráz	(Slovakia) HK Orange 20	–	3 years
24 September 2013	(Slovakia) Tomáš Matoušek	(Slovakia) HC Banská Bystrica	–	1 year, two-way
9 December 2013	(Czech Republic) Tomáš Netík	–	(Russia) Neftekhimik Nizhnekamsk	Unknown
11 December 2013	(Czech Republic) Zdeněk Kutlák	–	(Switzerland) HC Davos	1 year
12 January 2014	(Czech Republic) Marek Trončinský	–	(Czech Republic) HC Oceláři Třinec	Unknown
16 January 2014	(Slovakia) Richard Mráz	–	(Slovakia) HK Nitra	Loan
February 2014	(Slovakia) Tomáš Matoušek	–	(Slovakia) HC Banská Bystrica	Unknown
6 March 2014	(Slovakia) Marko Daňo	–	(United States) Columbus Blue Jackets	3 years

=== Free agents signed ===
Date	Player	Former team	Contract terms
21 April 2013	(Czech Republic) Martin Škoula	(Czech Republic) HC Litoměřice	1 year
29 June 2013	(Czech Republic) Tomáš Netík	(Russia) Neftekhimik Nizhnekamsk	2 years
31 August 2013	(Czech Republic) Zdeněk Kutlák	(Switzerland) HC Ambrì-Piotta	1 year
24 October 2013	(Slovakia) Branko Radivojevič	(Russia) Neftekhimik Nizhnekamsk	1 year
23 December 2013	(Czech Republic) Marek Trončinský	(Russia) Yugra Khanty-Mansiysk	1 year

=== Free agents lost ===
Date	Player	New team	Contract terms
20 July 2013	(Slovakia) Ján Tabaček	(Finland) Tappara Tampere	1 year
27 August 2013	(Slovakia) Ivan Švarný	(Croatia) Medveščak Zagreb	1 year
11 September 2013	(Slovakia) Branislav Konrád	(Czech Republic) HC Oceláři Třinec	2 months
12 September 2013	(Slovakia) Ivan Ďatelinka	(Slovakia) MHC Martin	Unknown
18 September 2013	(Slovakia) Milan Kytnár	(Czech Republic) HC Karlovy Vary	Tryout
18 September 2013	(Slovakia) Marek Svatoš	(Slovakia) HC Košice	1 year

=== Player signings ===
This is the list of all players that extended their contracts with HC Slovan Bratislava:

Date	Player	Contract prolonged until
10 April 2013	(Slovakia) Roman Kukumberg	30 April 2014
22 May 2013	(Slovakia) Vladimír Mihálik	30 April 2015
30 May 2013	(Czech Republic) Michal Vondrka	30 April 2014
7 June 2013	(Canada) Jonathan Sigalet	30 April 2015
23 July 2013	(Slovakia) Milan Kolena	30 April 2015
30 November 2013	(Slovakia) Miroslav Šatan	30 April 2014
21 January 2014	(Slovakia) Milan Bartovič	30 April 2017
21 January 2014	(Slovakia) Mário Bližňák	30 April 2016
21 January 2014	(Slovakia) Andrej Šťastný	30 April 2016
21 January 2014	(Czech Republic) Tomáš Mojžíš	30 April 2016
28 March 2014	(Slovakia) Peter Ölvecký	30 April 2016

=== Players lost via retirement ===
Date	Player	Player's future
30 April 2013	(Slovakia) Ján Lipiansky	Assistant coach in HC Slovan Bratislava

== Draft picks ==
Slovan's picks at the 2013 KHL Junior Draft in Donetsk, Ukraine.

Round	Pick	Player	Position	Nationality	Team (League)
1	No pick	Pick traded to Avtomobilist Yekaterinburg for Michal Sersen			
2	No pick	Pick traded to HC Spartak Moscow for Juraj Mikúš and Andrej Kudrna			
3	86	Juraj Šiška	C	Slovakia	HK Nitra (Slovak Extraliga)
4	124	Patrik Koch	D	Slovakia	Kometa Brno (Czech Extraliga)
4	125 P (Note: Player protected from Sibir Novosibirsk.)	Adrián Sloboda	D	Slovakia	Slovan Bratislava/HK 36 Skalica (KHL/Slovak Extraliga)
5	157	Lukáš Berák	LW	Slovakia	Dukla Trenčín (Slovak Extraliga)

== See also ==
- HC Slovan Bratislava all-time KHL record
- List of HC Slovan Bratislava seasons
