= 2013 European Trophy =

- League: European Trophy
- Sport: Ice hockey
- Duration: 6 August – 22 December 2013
- Teams: 32
- Total attendance: 88,722
- Top scorer: (Canada) Benoît Gratton (UPC Vienna Capitals)

Red Bull Salute
- Champions: (Finland) JYP
- Runners-up: (Sweden) Färjestad BK

European Trophy seasons
- ← 2012 2014–15 (CHL) →

The 2013 European Trophy was the fourth and final season of the European Trophy, an annually held European ice hockey tournament. It was also the eighth tournament since its predecessor, the Nordic Trophy, was launched in 2006. The regulation round began on 6 August 2013 with the South Division game between Piráti Chomutov–Sparta Praha, and ended on 8 September 2013. The playoffs were played between 19 and 22 December 2013 in Berlin. The preliminary schedule for the regulation round was released on 15 April 2013.

JYP won the tournament, defeating Färjestad BK in the final 2–1. Like last year's tournament, the same 32 teams participated in the tournament, marking the first time since 2007 that the teams remained the same from last year. For the first time in tournament history, Eisbären Berlin hosted the playoffs, the Red Bulls Salute. It marked the first time that the playoffs were hosted in a single city, as well as the first time that the playoffs weren't hosted in Austria.

== Tournament format ==
The 32 teams in the tournament were, partly based on geographical location, divided into four divisions: the West Division, the North Division, the South Division, and the East Division. Each division consisted of 8 teams who played a round-robin in their division, with an extra game against a local rival in their division, giving a total of 8 games per team. Each team was assigned four home games as well as four road games. The match-ups were nearly identical to last year, the only difference being that the home–away team assignings were switched for each game. Six teams qualified for the playoffs: Eisbären Berlin (as host), the winner of each division, and the best 2nd-placed team of all four divisions.

If at least two teams in the same division or at least two 2nd-placed teams ended up tied in points, the following tie-breaker format was used:

1. Best goal difference
2. Most goals scored in total (goals for)
3. Results in games against the tied teams
4. Drawing of lots

=== Playing format ===
If a game was tied after regulation time (60 minutes), a 5-minute overtime period was played. During overtime, both teams substitute only 4 players on the ice at once (except for 3 when either of the teams has a penalized player). If no team scores during the overtime period, a shootout was played, starting with three penalty shots for both teams. If the shootout remains tied after the first three rounds, sudden death rounds were played until a winning team has been determined.

In the regulation round games, the teams get three points for a regulation-time victory, two points for an overtime/shootout win, one point for losing in overtime/shootout, and zero points for a regulation loss.

=== Prize money ===
After the regulation round, the four division winners receive €25 000 each, the four second-placed teams €20 000, and the third, fourth and fifth team of each division receive €15 000, €10 000, and €5 000, respectively. Additionally, in the Red Bulls Salute, the winning team receives €50 000, while the team finishing second gets €10 000. In total, €360 000 was given out during the entire tournament.

== Participating clubs ==
2013 European Trophy Nordic teams (Divisions:: North,: West,: South,: East)
2013 European Trophy Central European teams (Divisions:: North,: West,: South,: East)

Division	Team	City	Home arena^{*}	Capacity	Joined NT/ET
North	Oulun Kärpät	(Finland) Oulu	Oulun Energia Areena	6,614	2006
North	Eisbären Berlin	(Germany) Berlin	O_{2} World	14,200	2010
North	Red Bull Salzburg	(Austria) Salzburg	Eisarena Salzburg	3,600	2010
North	Luleå HF	(Sweden) Luleå	Coop Norrbotten Arena	6,200	2011
North	Kometa Brno	(Czech Republic) Brno	Kajot Arena	7,200	2011
North	Mountfield HK	(Czech Republic) Hradec Králové	Zimní stadion	7,700	2013
North	HC Škoda Plzeň	(Czech Republic) Plzeň	ČEZ Aréna	8,420	2011
North	Hamburg Freezers	(Germany) Hamburg	O2 World	12,947	2012
South	Linköpings HC	(Sweden) Linköping	Cloetta Center	8,500	2006
South	HV71	(Sweden) Jönköping	Kinnarps Arena	7,038	2008
South	Sparta Praha	(Czech Republic) Prague	Tipsport Arena	13,150	2010
South	Piráti Chomutov	(Czech Republic) Chomutov	Multifunkční aréna Chomutov	5,250	2012
South	KalPa	(Finland) Kuopio	Kuopion Jäähalli	5,225	2011
South	Slovan Bratislava	(Slovakia) Bratislava	Slovnaft Arena	10,055	2011
South	UPC Vienna Capitals	(Austria) Vienna	Albert Schultz Eishalle	7,000	2011
South	JYP	(Finland) Jyväskylä	Synergia-areena	4,628	2012
East	TPS	(Finland) Turku	HK Arena	11,820	2006
East	Tappara	(Finland) Tampere	Hakametsä Areena	7,800	2006
East	Djurgårdens IF	(Sweden) Stockholm	Hovet	8,094	2006
East	SC Bern	(Switzerland) Bern	PostFinance-Arena	17,131	2010^{**}
East	Bílí Tygři Liberec	(Czech Republic) Liberec	Tipsport Arena	7,500	2011
East	ČSOB Pojišťovna Pardubice	(Czech Republic) Pardubice	ČEZ Aréna	10,194	2011
East	Brynäs IF	(Sweden) Gävle	Läkerol Arena	8,585	2012
East	HC Fribourg-Gottéron	(Switzerland) Fribourg	BCF Arena	6,900	2012
West	Färjestad BK	(Sweden) Karlstad	Löfbergs Lila Arena	8,647	2006
West	Frölunda Indians	(Sweden) Gothenburg	Scandinavium	12,044	2006
West	HIFK	(Finland) Helsinki	Helsinki Ice Hall	8,200	2006
West	Jokerit	(Finland) Helsinki	Hartwall Areena	13,349	2008
West	ZSC Lions	(Switzerland) Zürich	Hallenstadion	10,700	2010^{**}
West	Adler Mannheim	(Germany) Mannheim	SAP Arena	10,600	2010
West	ERC Ingolstadt	(Germany) Ingolstadt	Saturn Arena	4,815	2012
West	EV Zug	(Switzerland) Zug	Bossard Arena	7,015	2012

- Note (*): the stated home arenas don't have to be used in the European Trophy tournament.
- Note (**): SC Bern and ZSC Lions did not participate in 2011.

== Rivalries ==
- West Division
  - HIFK vs. Jokerit
  - Färjestad BK vs. Frölunda Indians
  - ERC Ingolstadt vs. Adler Mannheim
  - EV Zug vs. ZSC Lions
- North Division
  - Oulun Kärpät vs. Luleå HF
  - Eisbären Berlin vs. Hamburg Freezers
  - Škoda Plzeň vs. Kometa Brno
  - Red Bull Salzburg vs. Mountfield HK
- South Division
  - JYP vs. KalPa
  - HV71 vs. Linköpings HC
  - Sparta Praha vs. Piráti Chomutov
  - Slovan Bratislava vs. Vienna Capitals
- East Division
  - TPS vs. Tappara
  - Djurgårdens IF vs. Brynäs IF
  - ČSOB Pojišťovna Pardubice vs. Bílí Tygři Liberec
  - Fribourg-Gottéron vs. SC Bern

== Regulation round ==
Team is qualified for the playoffs
Team is eliminated from the tournament

=== North Division ===
Final standings. Eisbären Berlin qualified for the playoffs as the host team.

Team	GP	W	OTW	OTL	L	GF	GA	+/–	Pts
(Sweden) Luleå HF	8	6	0	1	1	22	14	+8	19
(Austria) Red Bull Salzburg	8	4	1	0	3	26	23	+3	14
(Czech Republic) HC Škoda Plzeň	8	3	1	2	2	17	17	0	13
(Czech Republic) Kometa Brno	8	2	3	0	3	20	19	+1	12
(Finland) Oulun Kärpät	8	4	0	0	4	19	21	–2	12
(Germany) Hamburg Freezers	8	3	0	1	4	28	27	+1	10
(Germany) Eisbären Berlin	8	3	0	1	4	21	25	–4	10
(Czech Republic) Mountfield HK	8	2	0	0	6	20	27	–7	6

=== East Division ===
Final standings.

Team	GP	W	OTW	OTL	L	GF	GA	+/–	Pts
(Sweden) Djurgårdens IF	8	5	1	1	1	26	20	+6	18
(Finland) TPS	8	3	1	2	2	23	22	+1	13
(Sweden) Brynäs IF	8	4	0	1	3	20	24	–4	13
(Finland) Tappara	8	3	1	1	3	24	22	+2	12
(Czech Republic) Pojišťovna Pardubice	8	3	1	1	3	22	20	+2	12
(Switzerland) Fribourg-Gottéron	8	2	2	1	2	23	24	–1	11
(Czech Republic) Bílí Tygři Liberec	8	3	0	0	5	26	27	–1	9
(Switzerland) SC Bern	8	2	1	0	5	19	24	–5	8

=== South Division ===
Final standings.

Team	GP	W	OTW	OTL	L	GF	GA	+/–	Pts
(Finland) JYP	8	6	0	1	1	30	19	+11	19
(Slovakia) Slovan Bratislava	8	5	0	1	2	31	25	+6	16
(Sweden) Linköpings HC	8	5	0	1	2	27	22	+5	16
(Czech Republic) Sparta Praha	8	3	2	1	2	28	21	+7	14
(Sweden) HV71	8	3	1	0	4	28	25	+3	11
(Austria) Vienna Capitals	8	2	1	1	4	23	24	–1	9
(Finland) KalPa	8	2	0	1	5	17	28	–11	7
(Czech Republic) Piráti Chomutov	8	0	2	0	6	19	39	–20	4

=== West Division ===
Final standings.

Team	GP	W	OTW	OTL	L	GF	GA	+/–	Pts
(Sweden) Färjestad BK	8	7	0	0	1	23	11	+12	21
(Sweden) Frölunda Indians	8	5	0	1	2	32	17	+15	16
(Finland) Jokerit	8	4	1	0	3	17	12	+5	14
(Germany) Adler Mannheim	8	4	2	1	1	21	21	0	14
(Switzerland) ZSC Lions	8	4	0	0	4	21	19	+2	12
(Germany) ERC Ingolstadt	8	3	0	1	4	22	25	–3	10
(Switzerland) EV Zug	8	1	1	0	6	14	30	–16	5
(Finland) HIFK	8	1	0	1	6	16	31	–15	4

=== Ranking of runner-up teams ===
To determine the last playoff spot (along with playoff host Eisbären Berlin and the four group winners), a ranking between the group runners-up was made, and the best runner-up got a place in the playoffs.

Final standings of runners-up of divisions:

Team	Division	GP	W	OTW	OTL	L	GF	GA	+/–	Pts
(Sweden) Frölunda Indians	West	8	5	0	1	2	32	17	+15	16
(Slovakia) Slovan Bratislava	South	8	5	0	1	2	31	25	+6	16
(Austria) Red Bull Salzburg	North	8	4	1	0	3	26	23	+3	14
(Finland) TPS	East	8	3	1	2	2	23	22	+1	13

== Playoffs ==
The playoffs, known as the Red Bulls Salute, took place in the Wellblechpalast and the O2 World, Berlin between 19 and 22 December 2013. It was played with two groups of three teams each. The teams played a round-robin in their group, for a total of three games, and the best-seeded team from each group qualified for the Final; all other teams were eliminated from the tournament. The groups were determined by a draw taking place in Berlin on 9 September 2013. The first game in each group took place in the Wellblechpalast; all other games, including the Final, were played in the O2 World.

The teams in the playoffs were:

- (Germany) Eisbären Berlin (Host)
- (Sweden) Luleå HF (Winner of North Division)
- (Sweden) Djurgårdens IF (Winner of East Division)
- (Finland) JYP (Winner of South Division)
- (Sweden) Färjestad BK (Winner of West Division)
- (Sweden) Frölunda Indians (Best runner-up)

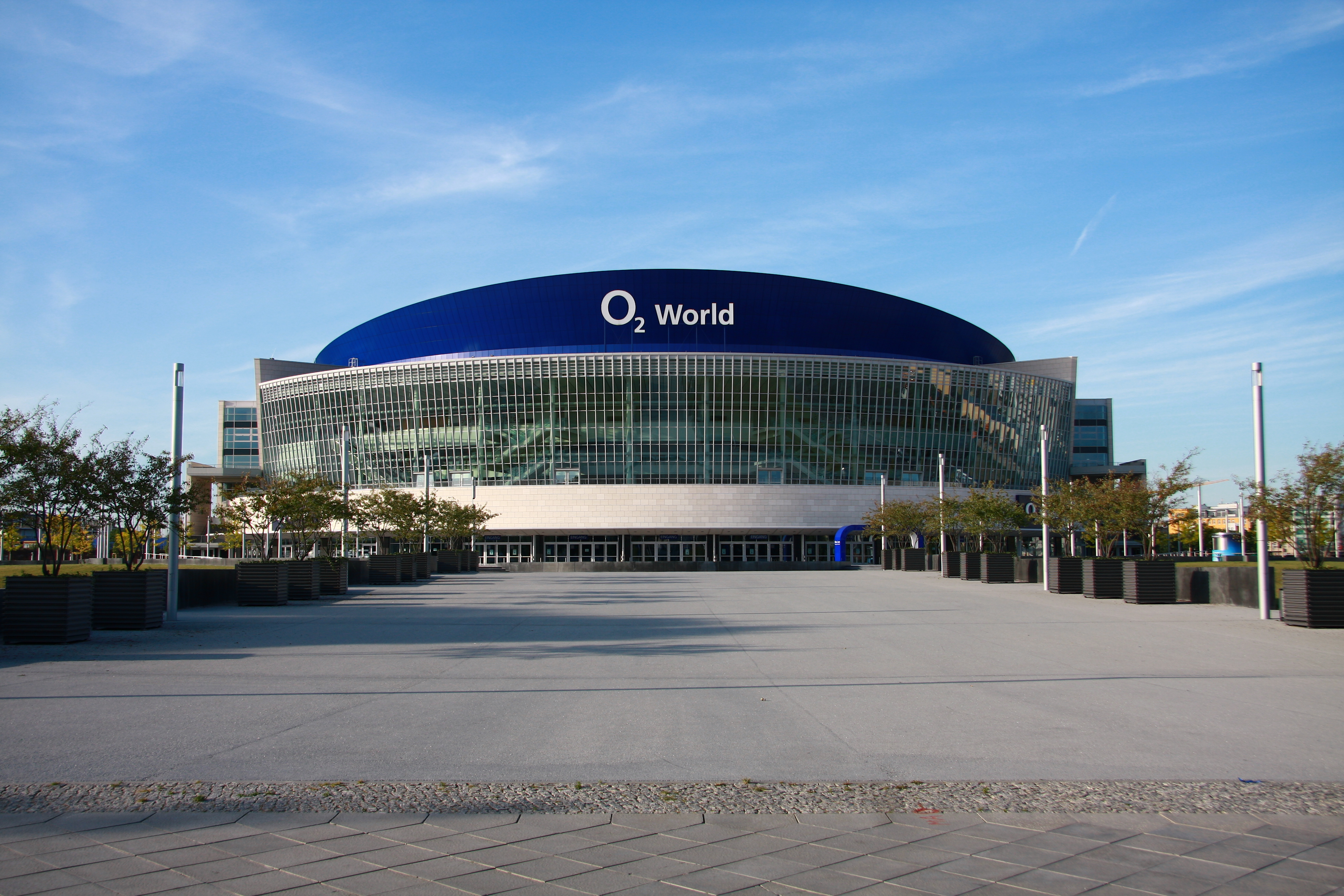
O2 World; Capacity: 14 200 Germany – Berlin

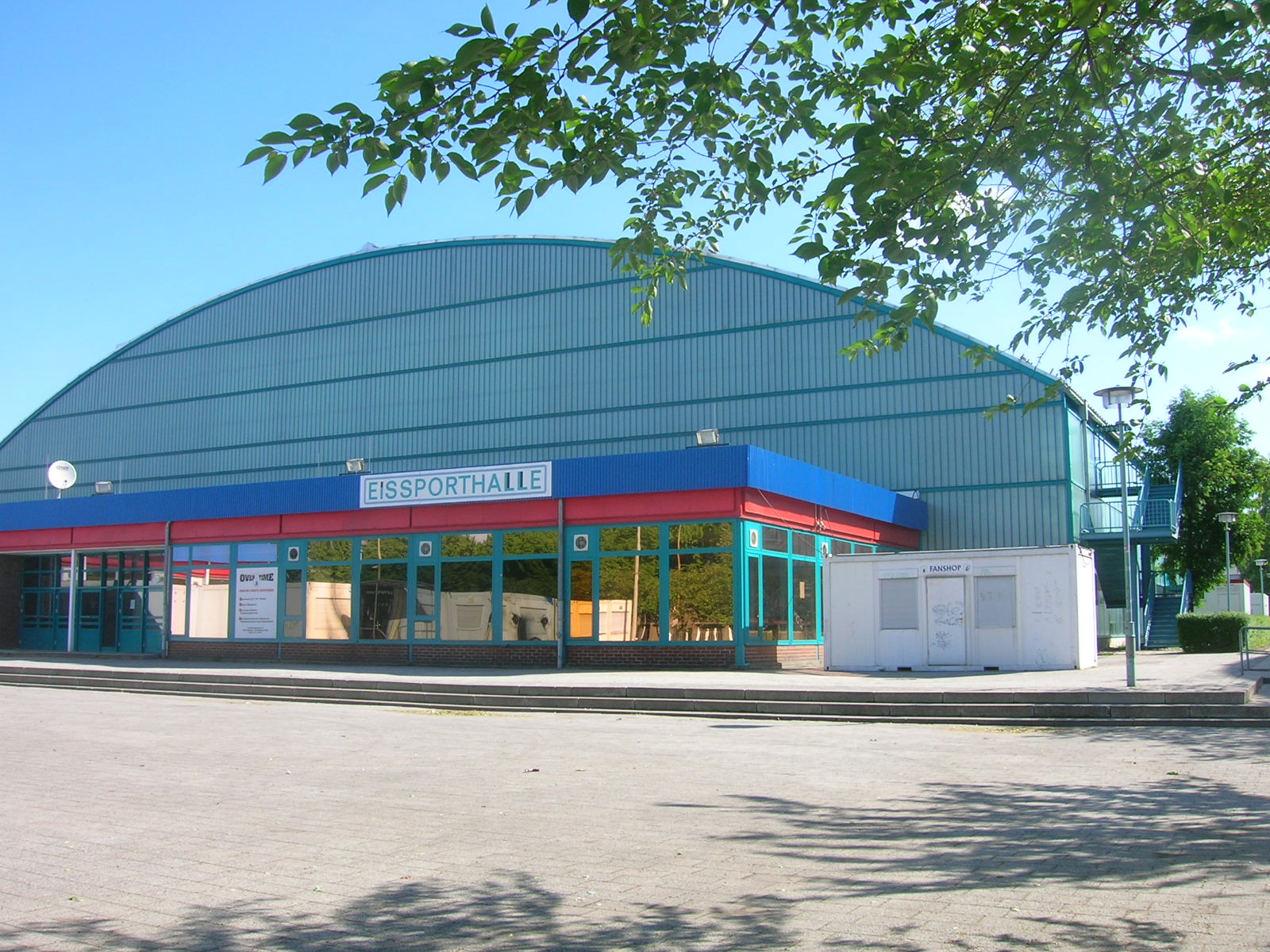
Wellblechpalast; Capacity: 4 695 Germany – Berlin

=== Groups ===
Team is qualified for the Final
Team is eliminated from the tournament

==== Group A ====
Team	GP	W	OTW	OTL	L	GF	GA	+/–	Pts
(Sweden) Färjestad BK	2	2	0	0	0	9	2	+7	6
(Germany) Eisbären Berlin	2	1	0	0	1	4	7	–3	3
(Sweden) Frölunda Indians	2	0	0	0	2	5	9	–4	0

===== Games =====
19 December 2013; 20:30	Färjestad BK (Sweden)	5–2 (1–1, 2–1, 2–0)	(Sweden) Frölunda Indians	Wellblechpalast, Berlin; Attendance: 1,050

Game reference

F. Pettersson Wentzel
Goalies
L. Johansson
Referees:
Persson
P. Sjöberg

	0–1	06:31 – M. Kahnberg (E. McGrath)
M.Gulas (M. Nygren, C.Berglund) – 07:14	1–1
M.Gulas (M. Holtet) – 23:48	2–1
P. Åberg – 33:00	3–1
	3–2	39:11 – R.Figren (P. Widerström, D. Axelsson)
J. Nygård – 52:45	4–2
M.Gulas (A. Grundel, P. Lundh) – 58:41	5–2

26 min
Penalties
26 min
37
Shots
33

20 December 2013; 20:30	Eisbären Berlin (Germany)	0–4 (0–0, 0–3, 0–1)	(Sweden) Färjestad BK	O2 World, Berlin; Attendance: 3,900

Game reference

Referees:
M. Kaukokari
P. Sjöberg

0–1	20:40 – M. Gulas (C. Berglund)
0–2	31:46 – M. Gulas (J. Connolly)
0–3	37:37 – P. Åslund (M. Gulas, J. Connolly)
0–4	47:16 – J. Connolly (V. Lajunen)

43 min
Penalties
18 min
22
Shots
29

21 December 2013; 20:30	Eisbären Berlin (Germany)	4–3 (0–0, 4–2, 0–1)	(Sweden) Frölunda Indians	O2 World, Berlin; Attendance: 4,200

Game reference

Referees:
S. Persson
T. Wehrli

	0–1	21:41 – R. Figren (M. Rosseli Olsen)
S. Lalonde – 27:14	1–1
M. Christensen (F. Busch, B. Tallackson) – 27:37	2–1
M. Foy (F. Hördler) – 28:16	3–1
	3–2	31:33 – M. Olimb (E. McGrath, M. Kahnberg)
C. Braun (F. Busch, M. Christensen) – 35:47	4–2
	4–3	42:08 – A. Blidh (E. Djuse, D. Axelsson)

10 min
Penalties
4 min
12
Shots
37

==== Group B ====
Team	GP	W	OTW	OTL	L	GF	GA	+/–	Pts
(Finland) JYP	2	1	1	0	0	6	3	+3	5
(Sweden) Luleå HF	2	1	0	1	0	6	5	+1	4
(Sweden) Djurgårdens IF	2	0	0	0	2	3	7	–4	0

===== Games =====
19 December 2013; 17:00	Djurgårdens IF (Sweden)	1–3 (0–0, 0–3, 1–0)	(Finland) JYP	Wellblechpalast, Berlin; Attendance: 1,900

Game reference

Referees:
M. Johansson
M. Kaukokari

	0–1	23:48 – J.Virtanen (M. Salmio, M. Nenonen)
	0–2	24:48 – O. Palve (O. Louhivaara)
	0–3	34:19 – M. Wärn (J. Tuppurainen, M. Luoma)
M. Sörensen (N. Andersson) – 57:24	1–3

12 min
Penalties
14 min
46
Shots
36

20 December 2013; 17:00	Luleå HF (Sweden)	2–3 GWS (1–0, 0–1, 1–1, 0–0, 0–1)	(Finland) JYP	O2 World, Berlin; Attendance: 2,500

Game reference

Referees:
G. Schukies
T. Wehrli

P. Ledin (A. Hedman) – 03:19	1–0
	1–1	30:31 – M. Nenonen (O. Louhivaara, J. Virtanen)
	1–2	47:48 – E. Perrin (J. Tuppurainen, K. Näkyvä)
R. Jonsson (V. Trukhno, L. Bryggman) – 50:23	2–2

Shootout
E. Perrin
10 min
Penalties
47 min
37
Shots
26

21 December 2013; 17:00	Luleå HF (Sweden)	4–2 (0–0, 2–1, 2–1)	(Sweden) Djurgårdens IF	O2 World, Berlin; Attendance: 2,600

Game reference

Referees:
G. Schukies
Johansson

J. Sandström (J. Fransson, D. Mannberg) – 28:21	1–0
N. Fogström (M. Oskarsson, J. Sandström) – 33:37	2–0
	2–1	38:49 – M. Ahlén (M.Ljungh, D. Lidström)
J. Sandström (M. Oskarsson, N. Fogström) – 49:16	3–1
	3–2	57:34 – M.Holmqvist (M. Sörensen)
K. Fabricius – 59:52	4–2

12 min
Penalties
35 min
28
Shots
27

=== Final ===
Time is local (UTC+1).

22 December 2013; 20:15	Färjestad BK (Sweden)	1-2 (0-1,1-1,0-0)	(Finland) JYP	O2 World, Berlin; Attendance: 3,100

Game reference

Danny Taylor
Goalies
Tuomas Tarkki

	0-1	08:25 – M. Wärn (O.Louhivaara, M. Luoma)
	0-2	21:56 – M. Nenonen
A. Grundel (R. Wallin) – 31:30	1-2

== Ranking and statistics ==
=== Final standings ===
The following is the final standings of the playoffs. Note that due to the playoff groups, the standings for the teams that failed to qualify for the Final were determined by their records in the playoff groups.

Gold medal	(Finland) JYP
Silver medal	(Sweden) Färjestad BK
3	(Sweden) Luleå HF
4	(Germany) Eisbären Berlin
5	(Sweden) Frölunda Indians
6	(Sweden) Djurgårdens IF

=== Scoring leaders ===
As of 8 September 2013

List shows the top 10 skaters sorted by points, then goals.

Player	Team	GP	G	A	Pts	PIM	POS
(Sweden) Marcus Sörensen	(Sweden) Djurgårdens IF	8	6	5	11	8	F
(Canada) Yanick Lehoux	(Germany) Adler Mannheim	8	3	8	11	6	F
(Finland) Jani Tuppurainen	(Finland) JYP	8	5	5	10	6	F
(United States) Chad Kolarik	(Sweden) Linköpings HC	7	4	6	10	12	F
(Slovakia) Michel Miklík	(Slovakia) Slovan Bratislava	8	3	7	10	2	F
(United States) Dan Sexton	(Finland) TPS	8	3	7	10	14	F
(Sweden) Niklas Olausson	(Sweden) Luleå HF	8	1	9	10	4	F
(Slovakia) Milan Bartovič	(Slovakia) Slovan Bratislava	8	8	1	9	2	F
(Germany) Frank Mauer	(Germany) Adler Mannheim	8	5	4	9	0	F
(Austria) Manuel Latusa	(Austria) Red Bull Salzburg	7	4	5	8	4	F

GP = Games played; G = Goals; A = Assists; Pts = Points; PIM = Penalties in minutes; POS = Position
positions: F = Forward; D = Defenceman
Source: Europeantrophy.com

=== Leading goaltenders ===
As of 8 September 2013

List shows the top 10 goaltenders, based on save percentage, who have played at least 40% of their team's minutes. If two goaltenders has the same save percentage the order is based on number shots against.

Player	Team	TOI	SA	GA	GAA	Sv%	SO
(Canada) Danny Taylor	(Sweden) Färjestad BK	240:00	121	3	0.75	97.52	1
(Canada) Leland Irving	(Finland) Jokerit	239:52	113	3	0.75	97.35	2
(Czech Republic) Matěj Machovský	(Czech Republic) HC Škoda Plzeň	244:34	118	5	1.23	95.76	1
(Slovakia) Marek Čiliak	(Czech Republic) Kometa Brno	183:43	90	4	1.31	95.56	0
(Germany) Felix Brückmann	(Germany) Adler Mannheim	250:59	144	8	1.91	94.44	0
(Sweden) Jonas Gunnarsson	(Sweden) HV 71	177:47	106	6	2.02	94.34	0
(Sweden) Fredrik Pettersson-Wentzel	(Sweden) Färjestad BK	238:18	122	7	1.76	94.26	1
(Sweden) David Rautio	(Sweden) Luleå HF	185:00	87	5	1.62	94.25	1
(Sweden) Johan Mattsson	(Sweden) Djurgårdens IF	245:58	127	8	1.95	93.70	0
(Czech Republic) Pavel Kantor	(Czech Republic) Mountfield HK	178:17	103	7	2.36	93.20	0

TOI = Time on ice (minutes:seconds); SA = Shots against; GA = Goals against; GAA = Goals against average; Sv% = Save percentage; SO = Shutouts
Sources: Europeantrophy.com and Eurohockey.com

=== European Star Award leaders ===
As of 8 September 2013

The European Star Award was a three stars award given to the three best players in each game. The first star got three points, the second got two points, and the third got one point. List shows the top ten players based on the number of European Star Award points.

Player	Team	GP	Pts	POS
(Finland) Mika Pyörälä	(Finland) Oulun Kärpät	7	11	F
(Canada) Matt Zaba	(Austria) Vienna Capitals	6	10	G
(Czech Republic) Tomáš Filippi	(Czech Republic) Bílí Tygři Liberec	7	8	F
(United States) Steve Moses	(Finland) Jokerit	8	8	F
(Germany) Felix Brückmann	(Germany) Adler Mannheim	4	7	G
(United States) John Laliberte	(Germany) ERC Ingolstadt	8	7	F
(Czech Republic) Matěj Machovský	(Czech Republic) HC Škoda Plzeň	4	7	G
(United States) Dan Sexton	(Finland) TPS	8	7	F
(Denmark) Morten Madsen	(Germany) Hamburg Freezers	7	6	F
(Austria) Bernd Brückler	(Austria) Red Bull Salzburg	3	6	G

GP = Games played; Pts = Points; POS = Position
positions: G = Goaltender; F = Forward; D = Defenceman
Source: Europeantrophy.com
