= Victor Löfstedt =

Swedish ice hockey player

- Born: October 16, 1986 (age 39) Sweden
- Height: 5 ft 9 in (175 cm)
- Weight: 168 lb (76 kg; 12 st 0 lb)
- Position: Right wing
- Shoots: Right
- Hockeyettan team Former teams: Kristianstads IK; IK Oskarshamn; Karlskrona HK
- NHL draft: Undrafted
- Playing career: 2009–present

Victor Löfstedt (born October 16, 1986) is a Swedish professional ice hockey player. He is currently playing with Kristianstads IK in the Swedish Hockeyettan.

He made his debut with Frölunda HC during the 2013 European Trophy.
