= Ossi Louhivaara =

Finnish ice hockey player

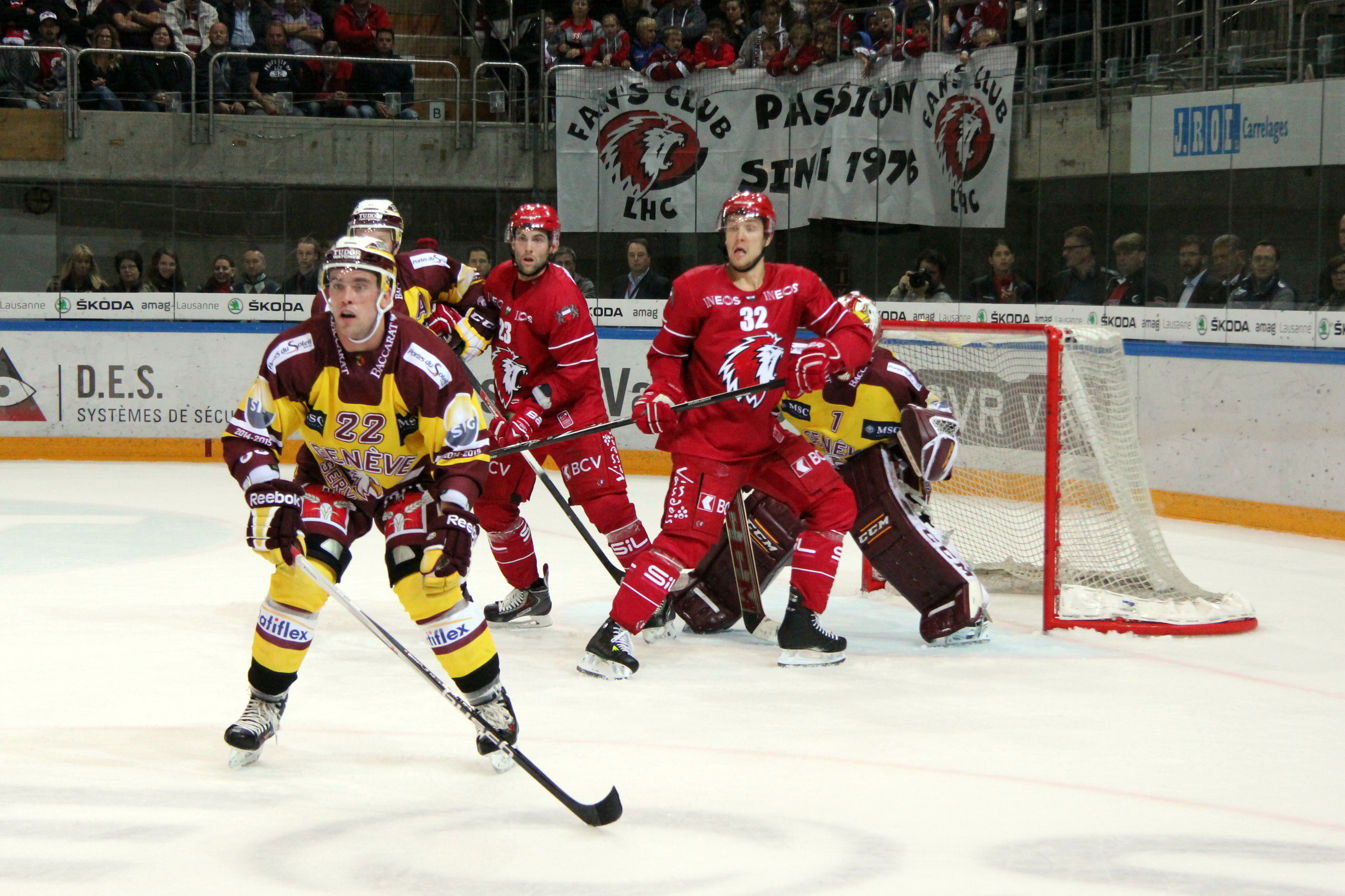
- Ossi Louhivaara with LHC in 2014
- Born: August 31, 1983 (age 42) Kotka, Finland
- Height: 6 ft 1 in (185 cm)
- Weight: 196 lb (89 kg; 14 st 0 lb)
- Position: Right wing
- Shot: Right
- Played for: JYP Jyväskylä; Lausanne HC
- National team: Finland
- NHL draft: 260th overall, 2003; Ottawa Senators
- Playing career: 2002–2021

Ossi Louhivaara (born August 31, 1983) is a Finnish former professional ice hockey player who most notably played with JYP Jyväskylä of the Liiga. Louhivaara was selected by the Ottawa Senators in the 8th round (260th overall) of the 2003 NHL entry draft.

== Playing career ==
Louhivaara made his debut in Finland's top-flight Liiga playing with JYP Jyväskylä during the 2004–05 SM-liiga season. He captured the Finnish national championship with JYP in 2009 and 2012.

After having spent ten years with JYP, he moved abroad to join Lausanne HC of the Swiss National League A with whom he signed a two-year deal prior to the 2014–15 season.

When his contract with Lausanne was up in 2016, Louhivaara returned to Finland with original club, JYP.

Louhivaara played 15 seasons with JYP Jyväskylä, making a total of 729 Liiga appearances before ending his 19-year professional career following the 2020–21 season, announcing his retirement on 6 April 2021.

== International play ==
After having represented Finnland's national team at the Euro Hockey Tour on several occasions, he made the roster for the 2015 World Championship in the Czech Republic.

== Career statistics ==
=== Regular season and playoffs ===
			Regular season					Playoffs
Season	Team	League	GP	G	A	Pts	PIM	GP	G	A	Pts	PIM
1999–2000	Titaanit	FIN.3	1	0	0	0	0	—	—	—	—	—
2000–01	Titaanit	FIN.3	32	10	12	22	10	—	—	—	—	—
2001–02	Titaanit	FIN.3	34	13	14	27	10	3	1	1	2	0
2002–03	KooKoo	Mestis	44	20	15	35	20	9	1	3	4	4
2003–04	KooKoo	Mestis	41	13	17	30	4	9	1	1	2	2
2004–05	JYP	SM-l	56	4	9	13	12	3	0	0	0	0
2005–06	JYP	SM-l	53	7	11	18	30	3	0	2	2	2
2006–07	JYP	SM-l	34	8	4	12	10	—	—	—	—	—
2007–08	JYP	SM-l	41	10	8	18	14	6	2	0	2	0
2007–08	SaPKo	Mestis	2	2	1	3	2	—	—	—	—	—
2008–09	JYP	SM-l	58	9	18	27	14	15	5	2	7	8
2009–10	JYP	SM-l	54	12	20	32	34	14	4	3	7	2
2009–10	D Team	Mestis	1	0	0	0	0	—	—	—	—	—
2010–11	JYP	SM-l	60	18	22	40	6	10	3	3	6	0
2011–12	JYP	SM-l	59	15	12	27	8	13	4	2	6	0
2012–13	JYP	SM-l	57	13	20	33	20	11	1	4	5	27
2013–14	JYP	Liiga	60	21	15	36	4	6	3	0	3	2
2014–15	Lausanne HC	NLA	46	14	15	29	37	7	1	1	2	0
2015–16	Lausanne HC	NLA	43	12	16	28	18	—	—	—	—	—
2016–17	JYP	Liiga	39	12	7	19	2	5	0	0	0	0
2017–18	JYP	Liiga	31	8	3	11	6	6	0	0	0	0
2018–19	JYP	Liiga	56	8	8	16	4	3	1	0	1	2
2019–20	JYP	Liiga	55	6	11	17	8	—	—	—	—	—
2020–21	JYP	Liiga	16	3	0	3	2	—	—	—	—	—
SM-l/Liiga totals			729	154	168	322	174	95	23	16	39	43

=== International ===
Year	Team	Event	GP	G	A	Pts	PIM
2015	Finland	WC	6	0	1	1	0
Senior totals			6	0	1	1	0
