= Ján Brejčák =

Slovak ice hockey player

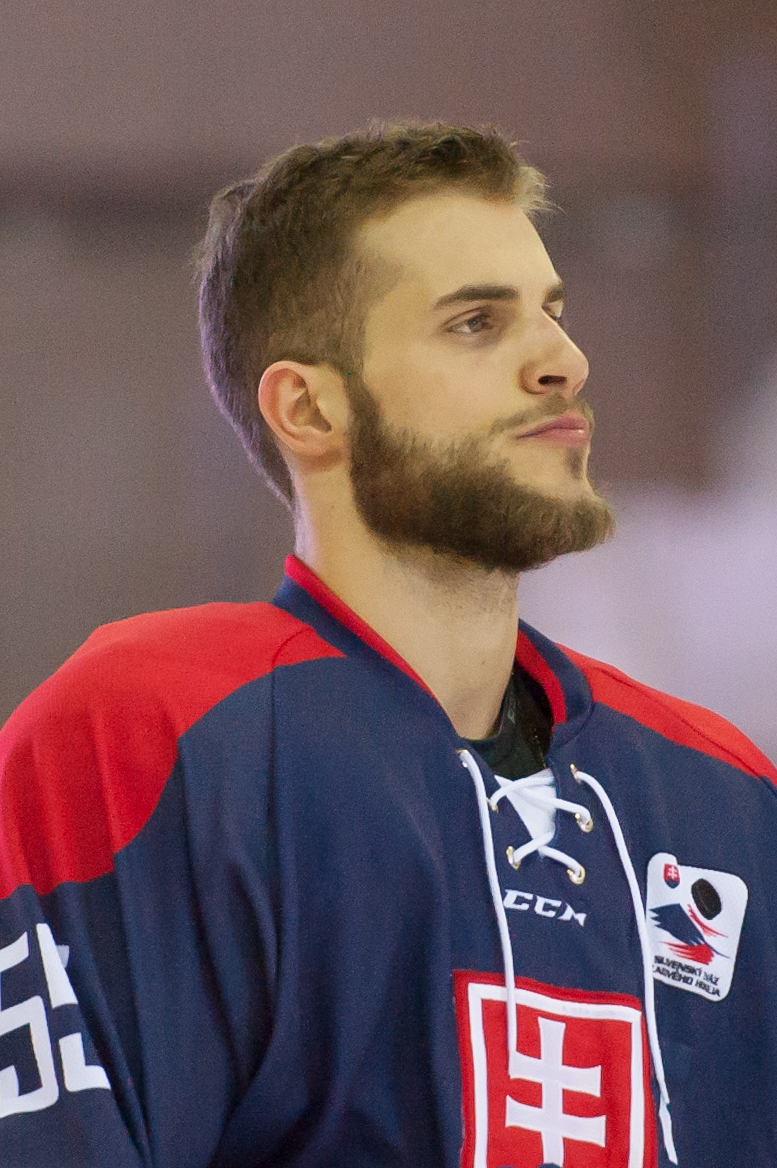
- Brejčák in 2013
- Born: 29 June 1989 (age 35); Poprad, Czechoslovakia
- Height: 6 ft 4 in (193 cm)
- Weight: 190 lb (86 kg; 13 st 8 lb)
- Position: Defence
- Shoots: Left
- Slovak team Former teams: HK Poprad; HK Orange 20; MHK Kežmarok; HC Litvínov; HC Stadion Litoměřice; HC Slovan Bratislava; HC Davos; Modo Hockey; HC '05 Banská Bystrica; HPK; Düsseldorfer EG; Storhamar Ishockey; Stavanger Oilers
- National team: Slovakia
- NHL draft: Undrafted
- Playing career: 2006–present

Ján Brejčák (born 29 June 1989) is a Slovak professional ice hockey defenceman who currently playing for HK Poprad of the Slovak Extraliga.

== Career ==
Brejčák came through the youth ranks of HK Poprad. He made his men's team debut during the 2006-07 season. In 2011, he joined the Czech team HC Litvinov, where he spent two years. From 2013 to 2015, Brejčák turned out for HC Slovan Bratislava of the Kontinental Hockey League.

After a tryout with HC Davos of the Swiss top-flight National League A (NLA), Brejčák was signed by HCD in August 2015.

== National team ==
Brejčák made his debut on Slovakia's men's national team in 2011 and represented his country at the 2014 World Championships in Belarus.

== Career statistics ==
=== Regular season and playoffs ===
			Regular season					Playoffs
Season	Team	League	GP	G	A	Pts	PIM	GP	G	A	Pts	PIM
2005–06	HK Poprad	Slovak-Jr.	2	0	2	2	0	6	0	0	0	10
2006–07	HK Poprad	Slovak-Jr.	32	1	1	2	46	—	—	—	—	—
2006–07	HK Poprad	Slovak	5	0	0	0	4	—	—	—	—	—
2007–08	HK Poprad	Slovak-Jr.	35	0	16	16	52	—	—	—	—	—
2007–08	HK Poprad	Slovak	4	0	0	0	0	5	0	0	0	4
2007–08	HK Orange 20	Slovak	12	0	1	1	28	—	—	—	—	—
2008–09	HK Poprad	Slovak-Jr.	5	5	1	6	4	—	—	—	—	—
2008–09	HK Poprad	Slovak	12	0	0	0	6	—	—	—	—	—
2008–09	HK Orange 20	Slovak	23	3	2	5	46	—	—	—	—	—
2009–10	HK Poprad	Slovak	42	2	6	8	40	5	0	0	0	37
2009–10	MHK Kežmarok	Slovak.1	7	0	0	0	4	—	—	—	—	—
2010–11	HK Poprad	Slovak	49	3	4	7	130	18	3	4	7	42
2011–12	HC Litvínov	Czech	39	1	1	2	87	—	—	—	—	—
2011–12	HC Stadion Litoměřice	Czech.1	6	0	0	0	6	—	—	—	—	—
2012–13	HC Litvínov	Czech	38	1	3	4	104	6	0	0	0	18
2013–14	HC Slovan Bratislava	KHL	20	0	2	2	14	—	—	—	—	—
2014–15	HC Slovan Bratislava	KHL	40	0	2	2	47	—	—	—	—	—
2015–16	HC Davos	NLA	28	0	2	2	63	—	—	—	—	—
2016–17	HK Poprad	Slovak	19	1	8	9	54	—	—	—	—	—
2016–17	Modo Hockey	Allsv	18	2	1	3	78	—	—	—	—	—
2017–18	HC '05 Banská Bystrica	Slovak	37	6	8	14	44	16	1	4	5	49
2018–19	HPK	Liiga	39	0	4	4	30	4	0	0	0	0
2019–20	HC '05 Banská Bystrica	Slovak	42	1	8	9	163	—	—	—	—	—
2020–21	HC '05 Banská Bystrica	Slovak	9	1	2	3	16	—	—	—	—	—
2020–21	Düsseldorfer EG	DEL	18	0	3	3	16	—	—	—	—	—
2021–22	HC '05 Banská Bystrica	Slovak	8	1	1	2	14	—	—	—	—	—
2021–22	Storhamar	Norway	14	0	0	0	66	12	0	3	3	16
2022–23	Stavanger Oilers	Norway	5	0	1	1	6	—	—	—	—	—
2022–23	HC '05 Banská Bystrica	Slovak	4	0	2	2	6	—	—	—	—	—
Liiga totals			39	0	4	4	30	4	0	0	0	0
KHL totals			60	0	4	4	61	—	—	—	—	—
Slovak totals			262	18	40	58	545	44	4	8	12	132

=== International ===
Year	Team	Event	Result	GP	G	A	Pts	PIM
2009	Slovakia	WJC	4th	7	0	0	0	6
2014	Slovakia	WC	9th	6	0	0	0	4
Junior totals				7	0	0	0	6
Senior totals				6	0	0	0	4
