= Peter Ölvecký =

Slovak ice hockey player

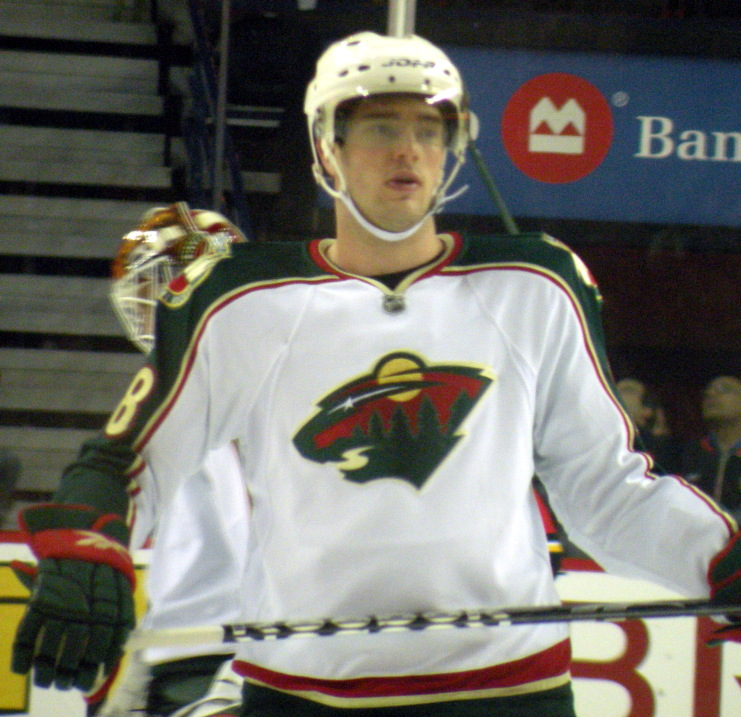
- Born: 11 October 1985 (age 41) Nové Zámky, Czechoslovakia
- Height: 6 ft 2 in (188 cm)
- Weight: 195 lb (88 kg; 13 st 13 lb)
- Position: Left wing
- Shot: Left
- Played for: Piráti Chomutov; HC Vítkovice Steel; Slovan Bratislava; Växjö Lakers Hockey; Lev Poprad; KalPa; Nashville Predators; Minnesota Wild; Dukla Trenčín
- National team: Slovakia
- NHL draft: 78th overall, 2004; Minnesota Wild
- Playing career: 2004–2019

Peter Ölvecký (born 11 October 1985) is a Slovak professional ice hockey forward. He played 32 games in the National Hockey League with the Minnesota Wild and Nashville Predators from 2008 to 2010. The rest of his career, which lasted from 2003 to 2019, was mainly spent in the Slovak Extraliga. Internationally Ölvecký played for the Slovakia national team at several tournaments, including the 2014 and 2018 Winter Olympics.

== Playing career ==
Ölvecký was drafted by the Minnesota Wild at the 2004 NHL entry draft, 78th overall. He was called up by the Wild from their American Hockey League (AHL) affiliate, the Houston Aeros, on 28 January 2009 and made his NHL debut on 30 January 2009, where he wore the number 28, against the Edmonton Oilers.

On 16 July 2009, he signed a one-year, two-way contract with the Nashville Predators.

On 10 March 2010, Ölvecký was loaned to the Manitoba Moose of the American Hockey League (AHL), the top AHL affiliate of the Vancouver Canucks, by the Milwaukee Admirals, Nashville's prospect team. In return, the Admirals received Moose veteran Marty Murray, on loan.

Ölvecký spent the fall of 2010 in HC Dukla Trenčín in Slovakia's Slovak Extraliga, where he scored 26 points (9 goals, 17 assists). He spent the 2011 part of the 2010–11 season with KalPa of the SM-liiga. He then signed with the Kontinental Hockey League (KHL) team Lev Poprad for the 2011–12 season, but he left the team after only six games. In January 2012, he signed a try-out contract lasting until 29 January with Växjö Lakers Hockey of the Swedish Elitserien (SEL).

== Career statistics ==
=== Regular season and playoffs ===
			Regular season					Playoffs
Season	Team	League	GP	G	A	Pts	PIM	GP	G	A	Pts	PIM
2002–03	Dukla Trenčín	SVK U18	8	4	1	5	10	—	—	—	—	—
2003–04	Dukla Trenčín	SVK U20	40	16	20	36	74	2	0	0	0	12
2003–04	Dukla Trenčín	SVK	16	0	0	0	18	—	—	—	—	—
2003–04	Dukla Trenčín II	SVK.2	2	0	0	0	0	—	—	—	—	—
2004–05	Dukla Trenčín	SVK U20	8	1	3	4	10	2	1	4	5	4
2004–05	Dukla Trenčín	SVK	45	10	9	19	49	12	1	0	1	6
2004–05	ŠHK 37 Piešťany	SVK.2	1	0	0	0	10	—	—	—	—	—
2005–06	Houston Aeros	AHL	67	14	18	32	56	7	1	3	4	4
2006–07	Houston Aeros	AHL	69	12	15	27	46	—	—	—	—	—
2007–08	Houston Aeros	AHL	61	17	16	33	38	5	1	1	2	4
2008–09	Minnesota Wild	NHL	31	2	5	7	12	—	—	—	—	—
2008–09	Houston Aeros	AHL	41	6	17	23	31	3	1	1	2	6
2009–10	Nashville Predators	NHL	1	0	0	0	0	—	—	—	—	—
2009–10	Milwaukee Admirals	AHL	62	11	23	34	22	—	—	—	—	—
2009–10	Manitoba Moose	AHL	8	1	3	4	0	6	3	1	4	4
2010–11	Dukla Trenčín	SVK	25	9	17	26	46	—	—	—	—	—
2010–11	KalPa	SM-liiga	15	5	5	10	4	3	0	0	0	2
2011–12	Lev Poprad	KHL	6	0	0	0	0	—	—	—	—	—
2011–12	Växjö Lakers	SEL	17	3	0	3	6	—	—	—	—	—
2012–13	Slovan Bratislava	KHL	49	7	5	12	42	4	0	0	0	4
2013–14	Slovan Bratislava	KHL	49	4	11	15	36	—	—	—	—	—
2014–15	Slovan Bratislava	KHL	31	0	2	2	6	—	—	—	—	—
2015–16	Dukla Trenčín	SVK	12	3	3	6	8	—	—	—	—	—
2015–16	HC Vítkovice Steel	ELH	12	3	2	5	10	—	—	—	—	—
2015–16	Piráti Chomutov	ELH	24	7	5	12	14	8	1	1	2	8
2016–17	Dukla Trenčín	SVK	22	4	8	12	16	—	—	—	—	—
2017–18	Dukla Trenčín	SVK	46	17	22	39	82	17	5	4	9	12
2018–19	Dukla Trenčín	SVK	42	17	10	27	28	6	1	1	2	2
SVK totals			208	60	69	129	247	35	7	5	12	20
AHL totals			308	61	92	153	193	21	6	6	12	18
NHL totals			32	2	5	7	12	—	—	—	—	—

=== International ===
Year	Team	Event	GP	G	A	Pts	PIM
2005	Slovakia	WJC	6	3	1	4	16
2009	Slovakia	WC	5	0	1	1	2
2013	Slovakia	WC	8	1	0	1	4
2014	Slovakia	OG	3	0	0	0	0
2018	Slovakia	OG	4	1	0	1	0
Senior totals			20	2	1	3	6
