= Zdeněk Kutlák =

Czech ice hockey player

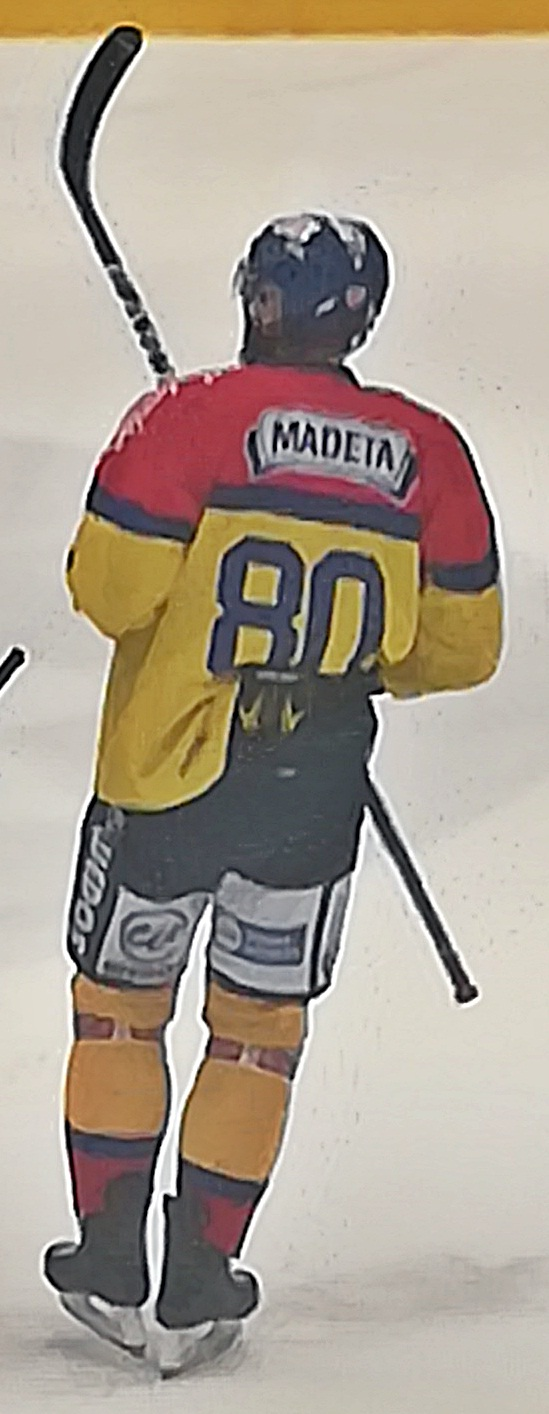
- Zdeněk Kutlák in 2017 during a game for Motor České Budějovice
- Born: February 13, 1980 (age 46) České Budějovice, Czechoslovakia
- Height: 6 ft 3 in (191 cm)
- Weight: 221 lb (100 kg; 15 st 11 lb)
- Position: Defence
- Shot: Left
- Czech 2.liga team Former teams: HC Příbram: Boston Bruins; HC Energie Karlovy Vary; HC Ambrì-Piotta; HC Slovan Bratislava; HC Davos; EC Red Bull Salzburg
- National team: Czech Republic
- NHL draft: 237th overall, 2000; Boston Bruins
- Playing career: 1998–2022

Medal record

Representing Czech Republic

World Championships
Bronze medal – third place	2012 Helsinki	

Zdeněk Kutlák (born February 13, 1980) is a Czech professional ice hockey defenceman who last played for HC Příbram of the 2nd Czech Republic Hockey League. He played 16 games for the Boston Bruins of the National Hockey League between 2000 and 2004. Internationally Kutlák has played for the Czech national team at two World Championships, winning a bronze in 2012.

== Playing career ==
Kutlák was drafted 237th overall by the Boston Bruins in the 2000 NHL entry draft from his local team HC České Budějovice. He spent most of his time in the American Hockey League for the Providence Bruins, but managed to play 16 games in the National Hockey League for Boston, scoring one goal and two assists for three points.

After four seasons in the Bruins organization, Kutlák returned to the Czech Extraliga, signing for HC Energie Karlovy Vary during the lockout in 2004 before re-joining Budějovice in 2005. In 2007, Kutlák moved to Switzerland and signed for National League A side HC Ambri-Piotta.

On August 14, 2014, Kutlák continued his journeyman career in opting to sign a one-year contract with Austrian club, EC Red Bull Salzburg, of the EBEL.

== Career statistics ==
=== Regular season and playoffs ===
			Regular season					Playoffs
Season	Team	League	GP	G	A	Pts	PIM	GP	G	A	Pts	PIM
1996–97	HC České Budějovice	CZE U18	45	8	11	19	—	—	—	—	—	—
1997–98	HC České Budějovice	CZE U20	43	1	6	7	—	—	—	—	—	—
1998–99	HC České Budějovice	CZE U20	31	6	14	20	—	—	—	—	—	—
1998–99	HC České Budějovice	CZE	20	1	3	4	4	3	0	0	0	2
1998–99	IHC Písek	CZE-2	8	0	1	1	0	—	—	—	—	—
1998–99	HC Strakonice	CZE-3	—	—	—	—	—	—	—	—	—	—
1999–00	HC České Budějovice	CZE U20	8	4	2	6	26	—	—	—	—	—
1999–00	HC České Budějovice	CZE	28	1	0	1	2	1	0	0	0	0
1999–00	SHC Vajgar Jindřichův Hradec	CZE-2	4	1	1	2	0	—	—	—	—	—
1999–00	IHC Písek	CZE-2	3	1	0	1	0	2	0	0	0	2
2000–01	Boston Bruins	NHL	10	0	2	2	4	—	—	—	—	—
2000–01	Providence Bruins	AHL	62	4	5	9	16	—	—	—	—	—
2001–02	Providence Bruins	AHL	80	5	15	20	73	2	0	0	0	0
2002–03	Boston Bruins	NHL	4	1	0	1	0	—	—	—	—	—
2002–03	Providence Bruins	AHL	68	4	12	16	52	4	1	0	1	2
2003–04	Boston Bruins	NHL	2	0	0	0	0	—	—	—	—	—
2003–04	Providence Bruins	AHL	47	7	12	19	22	2	0	0	0	2
2004–05	HC Energie Karlovy Vary	CZE	52	5	9	14	26	—	—	—	—	—
2005–06	HC České Budějovice	CZE	49	6	9	15	32	10	2	2	4	12
2006–07	HC Mountfield	CZE	46	5	10	15	50	11	0	0	0	49
2007–08	HC Ambrì–Piotta	NLA	43	5	16	21	26	—	—	—	—	—
2008–09	HC Ambrì–Piotta	NLA	47	7	15	22	18	—	—	—	—	—
2009–10	HC Ambrì–Piotta	NLA	46	7	15	22	38	—	—	—	—	—
2010–11	HC Ambrì–Piotta	NLA	39	5	11	16	14	—	—	—	—	—
2011–12	HC Ambrì–Piotta	NLA	44	9	9	18	54	—	—	—	—	—
2012–13	HC Ambrì–Piotta	NLA	45	1	21	22	26	—	—	—	—	—
2013–14	HC Slovan Bratislava	KHL	30	0	3	3	10	—	—	—	—	—
2013–14	HC Davos	NLA	17	5	2	7	6	4	0	0	0	0
2014–15	EC Red Bull Salzburg	AUT	40	7	9	16	36	9	0	2	2	0
2015–16	EC Red Bull Salzburg	AUT	51	4	29	33	35	19	2	4	6	18
2016–17	EC Red Bull Salzburg	AUT	30	1	7	8	12	—	—	—	—	—
2017–18	ČEZ Motor České Budějovice	CZE-2	48	11	14	25	22	10	0	2	2	20
2018–19	ČEZ Motor České Budějovice	CZE-2	33	3	10	13	32	11	1	6	7	4
2019–20	HC David Servis České Budějovice	CZE-3	2	0	1	1	0	—	—	—	—	—
2019–20	HC Příbram	CZE-3	13	2	12	14	0	3	0	1	1	0
2020–21	HC Příbram	CZE-3	4	2	4	6	0	—	—	—	—	—
2021–22	HC Baník Příbram	CZE-3	25	6	13	19	4	3	0	2	2	2
CZE totals			195	18	31	49	114	25	2	2	4	63
NHL totals			16	1	2	3	4	—	—	—	—	—
NLA totals			281	39	89	128	182	4	0	0	0	0

=== International ===
Year	Team	Event	GP	G	A	Pts	PIM
1998	Czech Republic	EJC	6	0	1	1	2
2000	Czech Republic	WJC	7	0	0	0	2
2006	Czech Republic	WC	9	0	0	0	0
2012	Czech Republic	WC	1	0	0	0	4
2013	Czech Republic	WC	8	1	0	1	0
Junior totals			13	0	1	1	4
Senior totals			18	1	0	1	4
