= Wellblechpalast =

Ice hockey arena in Germany

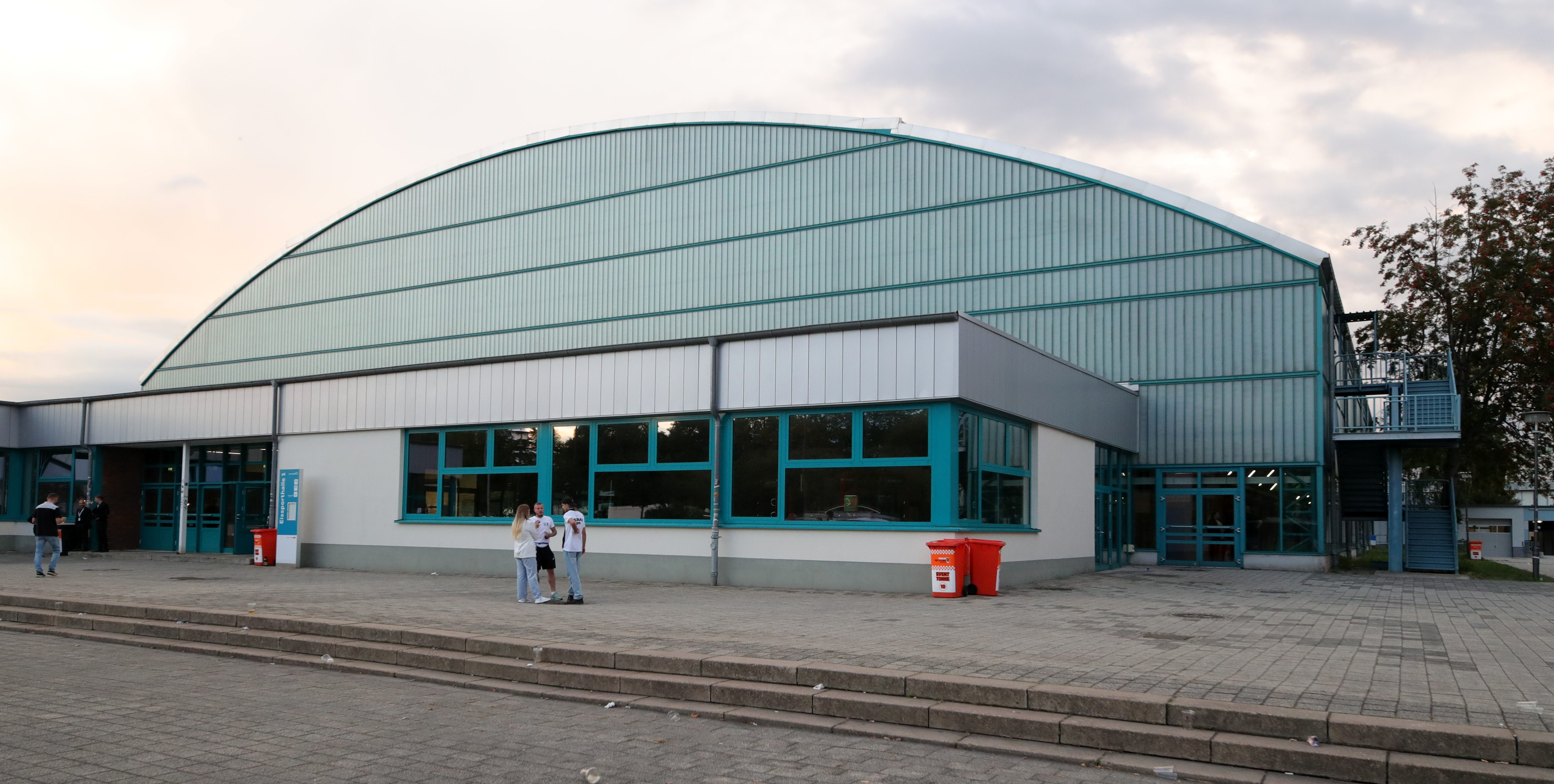
- Wellblechpalast in 2022
- Interactive map of Wellblechpalast
- Former names: Kunsteisstadion im Sportforum Hohenschönhausen (1964-2001)
- Coordinates: 52°32′27″N 13°28′49″E
- Owner: State of Berlin
- Operator: State of Berlin
- Capacity: 4,695

Construction
- Opened: 1963

Tenants
- Eisbären Berlin (1964-2008); Eisbären Juniors Berlin; ESC Berlin

Wellblechpalast is the official name of the ice hockey arena in the Sportforum Hohenschönhausen in the locality of Alt-Hohenschönhausen of the borough of Lichtenberg of Berlin, Germany. The arena was built in 1963 and was the home stadium of the ice hockey team of SC Dynamo Berlin and then Eisbären Berlin until the 2007–08 season. The facility still serves as training unit for the Eisbären Berlin; it also hosts games of the Eisbären Juniors team, and occasionally games of several other Berlin-based amateur teams. The structure's roof is made up of corrugated iron sheets ("Wellblech" in German). The nickname Wellblechpalast (corrugated roof palace), coined by a journalist during the early 1990s, originally had a pejorative connotation that characterised both the destitute nature of the building and the Eisbären Berlin ice hockey team, which at the time regularly finished at the bottom of the standings. However, the name stuck and assumed a cult status among the club's fans.

The arena accommodates 4,695 people; the seating capacity is 1,600, with 3,095 standing on the terraces.

On 7 October 2001, it was officially renamed to Wellblechpalast.
