= Tomáš Mojžíš =

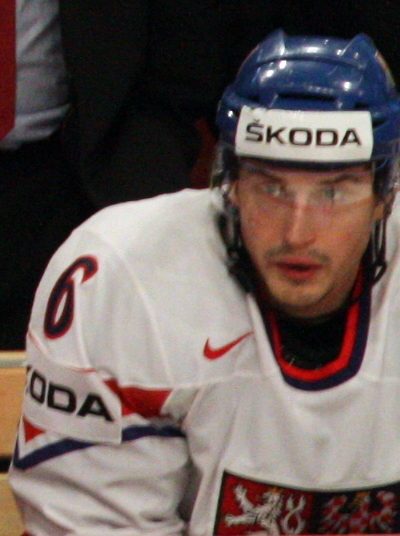
- Mojžíš in 2012
- Born: 2 May 1982 (age 44) Kolín, Czechoslovakia
- Height: 6 ft 1 in (185 cm)
- Weight: 192 lb (87 kg; 13 st 10 lb)
- Position: Defence
- Shot: Left
- Played for: Slovan Bratislava; HC Dinamo Minsk; MODO Hockey; Vancouver Canucks; St. Louis Blues; Minnesota Wild; Lev Praha
- National team: Czech Republic
- NHL draft: 246th overall, 2001; Toronto Maple Leafs
- Playing career: 2003–2018

Tomáš Mojžíš
Medal record

Representing Czech Republic

World Championships
Gold medal – first place	2010 Germany	
Bronze medal – third place	2012 Finland	

Tomáš Mojžíš (born 2 May 1982) is a Czech former ice hockey defenceman. He played 17 games in the National Hockey League with the Vancouver Canucks, St. Louis Blues, and Minnesota Wild from 2006 to 2008. The rest of his career, which lasted from 2003 to 2018, was mainly spent in Europe. Internationally Mojžíš played for the Czech national team, and won a gold medal at the 2010 World Championship.

== Playing career ==
Mojžíš was drafted in the eighth round, 246th overall, by the Toronto Maple Leafs in the 2001 NHL entry draft. He played for HC Pardubice (Czech Jr.), the Moose Jaw Warriors (WHL), Seattle Thunderbirds (WHL), Manitoba Moose (AHL), Peoria Rivermen (AHL), St. Louis Blues (NHL), and Vancouver Canucks (NHL).

He was a member of the Czech national inline hockey team at the 2008 Men's World Inline Hockey Championships in Bratislava, Slovakia.

On 7 July 2008 Mojžíš signed a multi-year contract with the Minnesota Wild. Tomáš featured in only four games with the Wild before he was later assigned to affiliate, the Houston Aeros for the majority of the 2008–09 season. He was subsequently released from the second year of his contract with the Wild and signed with Modo Hockey of the Swedish Elitserien on 13 July 2009.

On 18 July 2010 Mojžíš headed to Belarus and signed a one-year contract as a free agent with HC Dinamo Minsk of the KHL.

== Awards ==
- 2003 – WHL West First All-Star Team
- 2003 – CHL First All-Star Team

== Career statistics ==
=== Regular season and playoffs ===
			Regular season					Playoffs
Season	Team	League	GP	G	A	Pts	PIM	GP	G	A	Pts	PIM
1999–00	HC IPB Pojišťovna Pardubice	CZE U20	41	7	1	8	73	6	0	1	1	6
2000–01	Moose Jaw Warriors	WHL	72	11	25	36	115	4	0	1	1	8
2001–02	Moose Jaw Warriors	WHL	28	2	11	13	43	—	—	—	—	—
2001–02	Seattle Thunderbirds	WHL	36	8	15	23	66	11	1	3	4	20
2002–03	Seattle Thunderbirds	WHL	62	21	49	70	126	15	1	6	7	36
2003–04	Manitoba Moose	AHL	63	5	13	18	50	—	—	—	—	—
2004–05	Manitoba Moose	AHL	80	7	23	30	62	14	0	2	2	28
2005–06	Vancouver Canucks	NHL	7	0	1	1	12	—	—	—	—	—
2005–06	Manitoba Moose	AHL	37	5	13	18	52	—	—	—	—	—
2005–06	Peoria Rivermen	AHL	12	3	4	7	14	1	0	0	0	0
2006–07	St. Louis Blues	NHL	6	1	0	1	0	—	—	—	—	—
2006–07	Peoria Rivermen	AHL	69	2	24	26	112	—	—	—	—	—
2007–08	Sibir Novosibirsk	RSL	28	2	2	4	38	—	—	—	—	—
2008–09	Minnesota Wild	NHL	4	0	1	1	2	—	—	—	—	—
2008–09	Houston Aeros	AHL	46	7	15	22	51	15	2	0	2	8
2009–10	Modo Hockey	SEL	52	5	5	10	44	—	—	—	—	—
2010–11	Dinamo Minsk	KHL	42	2	7	9	46	—	—	—	—	—
2011–12	TPS	FIN	59	6	26	32	40	—	—	—	—	—
2012–13	HC Sparta Praha	CZE	9	1	2	3	6	—	—	—	—	—
2012–13	HC Lev Praha	KHL	10	0	1	1	4	—	—	—	—	—
2012–13	HC Slovan Bratislava	KHL	11	1	5	6	12	4	0	1	1	4
2013–14	HC Slovan Bratislava	KHL	50	5	8	13	71	—	—	—	—	—
2014–15	HC ČSOB Pojišťovna Pardubice	CZE	6	1	1	2	4	—	—	—	—	—
2014–15	TPS	FIN	45	1	5	6	26	—	—	—	—	—
2015–16	TPS	FIN	21	1	1	2	10	—	—	—	—	—
2015–16	Bílí Tygři Liberec	CZE	26	1	8	9	30	14	2	3	5	26
2016–17	Bílí Tygři Liberec	CZE	36	1	3	4	40	14	0	3	3	4
2017–18	Bílí Tygři Liberec	cZE	5	0	0	0	6	—	—	—	—	—
2017–18	HC Dynamo Pardubice	CZE	42	2	5	7	34	7	0	0	0	6
KHL totals			113	8	21	29	133	4	0	1	1	4
NHL totals			17	1	2	3	14	—	—	—	—	—

=== International ===
Year	Team	Event	GP	G	A	Pts	PIM
2000	Czech Republic	WJC18	6	1	3	4	8
2002	Czech Republic	WJC	7	0	0	0	4
2010	Czech Republic	WC	6	1	0	1	4
2012	Czech Republic	WC	9	0	0	0	8
Junior totals			13	1	3	4	12
Senior totals			15	1	0	1	12

== Transactions ==
- 24 June 2001 – Drafted in the eighth round, 246th overall by the Toronto Maple Leafs in the 2001 NHL entry draft
- 4 September 2002 – Traded by the Toronto Maple Leafs to the Vancouver Canucks for Brad Leeb
- 9 March 2006 – Traded by the Vancouver Canucks with the Canucks' third round selection (Vladimir Zharkov — later acquired by New Jersey) in the 2006 NHL entry draft to the St. Louis Blues for Eric Weinrich
- 7 July 2008 – Signed as an unrestricted free agent by the Minnesota Wild
- 13 July 2009 – Signed as an unrestricted free agent by Modo
- 18 July 2010 – Signed as an unrestricted free agent by HC Dinamo Minsk
