= Tomáš Matoušek =

Slovak ice hockey player

- Born: 15 June 1992 (age 32); Banská Bystrica, Czechoslovakia
- Height: 6 ft 3 in (191 cm)
- Weight: 192 lb (87 kg; 13 st 10 lb)
- Position: Forward
- Shoots: Left
- Slovak team Former teams: HC '05 Banská Bystrica; HK Orange 20; Donbass Donetsk; HC Slovan Bratislava; HC Verva Litvínov; HK Dukla Michalovce
- National team: Slovakia
- NHL draft: Undrafted
- Playing career: 2011–present

Tomáš Matoušek (born 15 June 1992) is a Slovak ice hockey player who currently playing for HC '05 Banská Bystrica of the Slovak Extraliga.

He participated at the 2012 World Junior Ice Hockey Championships as a member of the Slovakia men's national junior ice hockey team.

== Career statistics ==
=== Regular season and playoffs ===
			Regular season					Playoffs
Season	Team	League	GP	G	A	Pts	PIM	GP	G	A	Pts	PIM

=== International ===
Year	Team	Event	Result	GP	G	A	Pts	PIM
2010	Slovakia	WJC18	8th	6	2	0	2	0
2011	Slovakia	WJC	8th	6	0	0	0	2
2012	Slovakia	WJC	6th	6	1	0	1	8
2017	Slovakia	WC	14th	5	2	0	2	25
Junior totals				18	3	0	3	10
Senior totals				5	2	0	2	25

== Awards and honors ==
Award	Year
Slovak
Champion	2017, 2019, 2022
