= Miroslav Kopřiva =

Czech ice hockey player

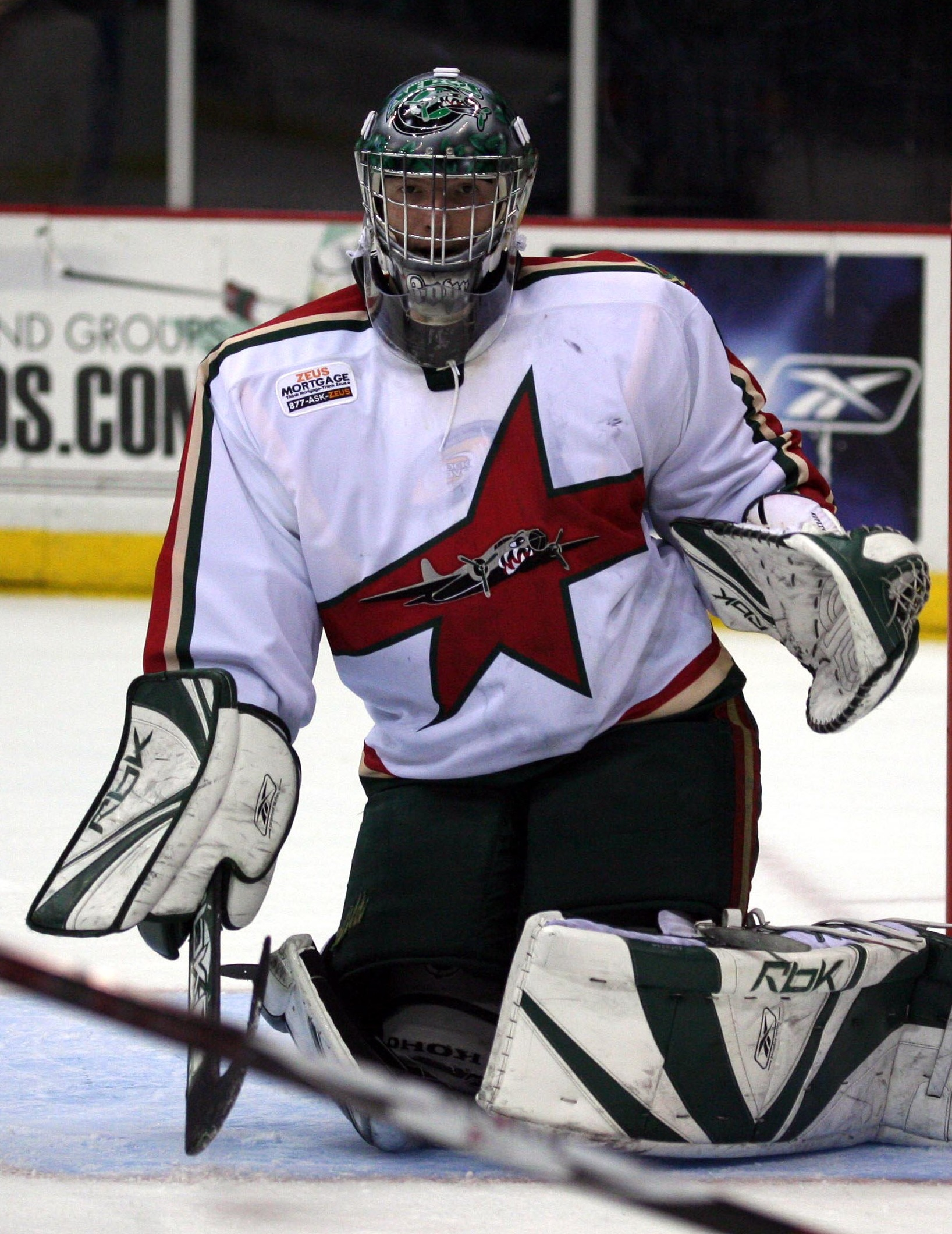
- Kopřiva with the Houston Aeros in 2007
- Born: December 5, 1983 (age 42) Kladno, Czechoslovakia
- Height: 6 ft 4 in (193 cm)
- Weight: 218 lb (99 kg; 15 st 8 lb)
- Position: Goaltender
- Caught: Right
- Played for: Coventry Blaze; Kosice HC; Pardubice HC; Bratislava Slovan; Slavia Praha HC; Rytíři Kladno; Houston Aeros
- NHL draft: 187th overall, 2003; Minnesota Wild
- Playing career: 2003–2019

Miroslav Kopřiva (born 5 December 1983) is a Czech former professional ice hockey goaltender who last played for the Coventry Blaze of the EIHL. He was drafted 187th overall by the Minnesota Wild in 2003.

Kopřiva is the first ever Blaze goaltender to get MOTM in all three of his games following his debut and is the second player of any position in the team's history to achieve this feat.

== International ==
| Year | Team | Event | GP | W | L | T | MIN | GA | SO | GAA | SV% |
|---|---|---|---|---|---|---|---|---|---|---|---|
| 2001 | Czech Republic | U18 | 4 | — | — | 0 | 240:29 | 16 | 0 | 3.99 | .877 |
| Junior totals | | | 4 | — | — | 0 | 240:29 | 16 | 0 | 3.99 | .877 |
