= Lukáš Kozák =

Slovak ice hockey player

- Born: 29 October 1991 (age 34) Martin, Czechoslovakia
- Height: 6 ft 2 in (188 cm)
- Weight: 194 lb (88 kg; 13 st 12 lb)
- Position: Defence
- Shoots: Left
- Slovak team Former teams: HC '05 Banská Bystrica; MHC Martin; MHK Dolný Kubín; HK Orange 20; HC VCES Hradec Králové; HC Slovan Bratislava; HK 36 Skalica; HK Dukla Trenčín; HC Kometa Brno; KHL Medveščak Zagreb; MsHK Žilina; HK Poprad; HC Energie Karlovy Vary; HC RT Torax Poruba; HC Nové Zámky
- Playing career: 2009–present

Lukáš Kozák (born 29 October 1991) is a Slovak professional ice hockey defenceman who is currently playing for HC '05 Banská Bystrica of the Slovak Extraliga.

== Career statistics ==
=== Regular season and playoffs ===
			Regular season					Playoffs
Season	Team	League	GP	G	A	Pts	PIM	GP	G	A	Pts	PIM

=== International ===
Year	Team	Event	Result	GP	G	A	Pts	PIM
2009	Slovakia	WJC18	7th	6	0	0	0	6
2011	Slovakia	WJC	8th	6	0	0	0	2
Junior totals				12	0	0	0	8
