= Michel Miklík =

Slovak ice hockey player

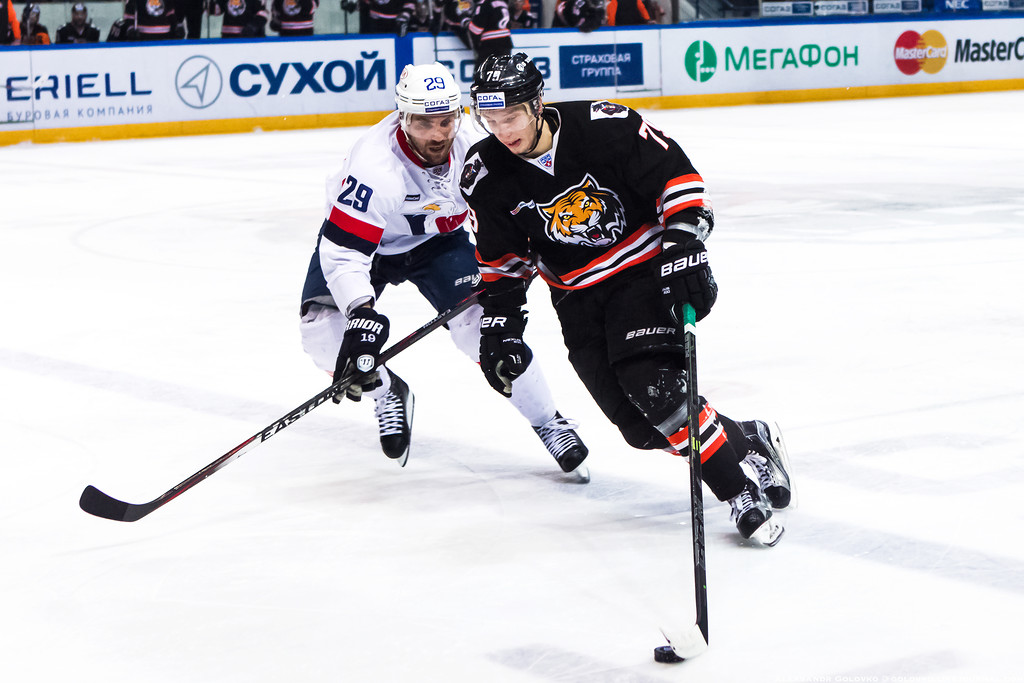
- Miklík (29) in action for HC Slovan Bratislava during a KHL game on February 4, 2016
- Born: July 31, 1982 (age 43) Piešťany, Czechoslovakia
- Height: 6 ft 0 in (183 cm)
- Weight: 198 lb (90 kg; 14 st 2 lb)
- Position: Left wing
- Shoots: Right
- Slovak 1. Liga team Former teams: HK Trnava; MHk 32 Liptovský Mikuláš; HC '05 Banská Bystrica; MsHK Žilina; HC Košice; HK Dukla Trenčín; HC 46 Bardejov; HC Slovan Bratislava; Amur Khabarovsk; ŠHK 37 Piešťany; HC Kometa Brno; JYP; Bratislava Capitals; Dragons de Rouen; HC Topoľčany
- National team: Slovakia
- NHL draft: Undrafted
- Playing career: 2001–present

Michel Miklík (Slovak pronunciation: [ˈmiʂel ˈmikliːk]; born July 31, 1982) is a Slovak ice hockey player who currently plays for HK Trnava of the Slovak 1. Liga.

Medal record

Representing Slovakia

Men's ice hockey

World Championships
Silver medal – second place	2012 Helsinki	

== Career ==
Miklík began playing junior ice hockey in his hometown club ŠHK 37 Piešťany. He debuted at senior level in the 2001–02 season for MHk 32 Liptovský Mikuláš. He has won the Slovak Extraliga title for HC Košice in the 2008–09 and 2010–11 season. He signed for HC Slovan Bratislava before their first KHL season.

== International play ==
Miklík played at the 2012 IIHF World Championship, where Slovakia was defeated by Russia in the final game.

== Career statistics ==
=== Regular season and playoffs ===
			Regular season					Playoffs
Season	Team	League	GP	G	A	Pts	PIM	GP	G	A	Pts	PIM
2001–02	HK 32 Liptovský Mikuláš	Slovak	15	0	0	0	0	—	—	—	—	—
2002–03	HK 32 Liptovský Mikuláš	Slovak	51	4	6	10	26	—	—	—	—	—
2003–04	HK 32 Liptovský Mikuláš	Slovak	45	5	1	6	10	—	—	—	—	—
2004–05	HK 32 Liptovský Mikuláš	Slovak	43	7	7	14	4	5	1	0	1	0
2004–05	ŠaHK Iskra Banská Bystrica	Slovak.1	3	2	1	3	0	—	—	—	—	—
2005–06	HK 32 Liptovský Mikuláš	Slovak	31	1	4	5	12	—	—	—	—	—
2005–06	MsHK Žilina	Slovak	22	4	3	7	10	—	—	—	—	—
2006–07	HK 32 Liptovský Mikuláš	Slovak	54	19	15	34	38	—	—	—	—	—
2007–08	HC Košice	Slovak	52	13	7	20	12	19	7	7	14	6
2008–09	HC Košice	Slovak	54	20	22	42	24	18	3	2	5	8
2009–10	Dukla Trenčín	Slovak	25	8	8	16	6	—	—	—	—	—
2010–11	HC Košice	Slovak	57	29	14	43	10	14	8	6	14	14
2010–11	HC 46 BEMACO Bardejov	Slovak.1	1	1	1	2	0	—	—	—	—	—
2011–12	HC Košice	Slovak	55	22	14	36	12	16	6	5	11	6
2011–12	HC 46 BEMACO Bardejov	Slovak.1	2	0	1	1	0	—	—	—	—	—
2012–13	HC Slovan Bratislava	KHL	52	9	15	24	16	—	—	—	—	—
2013–14	HC Slovan Bratislava	KHL	54	14	18	32	10	—	—	—	—	—
2014–15	Amur Khabarovsk	KHL	59	13	15	28	26	—	—	—	—	—
2015–16	Amur Khabarovsk	KHL	6	0	2	2	0	—	—	—	—	—
2015–16	HC Slovan Bratislava	KHL	40	12	3	15	16	3	0	0	0	2
2016–17	HC Košice	Slovak	8	4	6	10	2	—	—	—	—	—
2016–17	ŠHK 37 Piešťany	Slovak.2	1	2	1	3	0	—	—	—	—	—
2016–17	HC Kometa Brno	ELH	6	0	0	0	4	—	—	—	—	—
2016–17	JYP	Liiga	11	7	3	10	6	15	6	3	9	16
2017–18	HC OSMOS Bratislava	Slovak.1	9	4	9	13	2	—	—	—	—	—
2017–18	JYP	Liiga	17	1	4	5	4	—	—	—	—	—
2017–18	HC Košice	Slovak	17	6	12	18	6	5	1	1	2	4
2018–19	Dragons de Rouen	FRA	35	16	16	32	6	16	1	3	4	2
2019–20	HC Slovan Bratislava	Slovak	15	1	7	8	8	—	—	—	—	—
2019–20	HC Topoľčany	Slovak.1	26	15	10	25	10	—	—	—	—	—
2020–21	Bratislava Capitals	ICEHL	45	4	11	15	20	4	1	0	1	2
2021–22	HK Gladiators Trnava	Slovak.1	48	23	24	47	26	11	6	4	10	6
Slovak totals			544	143	126	269	180	77	26	21	47	38
KHL totals			211	48	53	101	68	7	0	2	2	2

=== International ===
Year	Team	Event	Result	GP	G	A	Pts	PIM
2012	Slovakia	WC	2nd place, silver medalist(s)	10	1	1	2	0
2013	Slovakia	WC	8th	8	2	2	4	2
2014	Slovakia	OG	11th	4	0	0	0	2
2014	Slovakia	WC	9th	7	4	7	11	0
2015	Slovakia	WC	9th	5	0	0	0	0
2017	Slovakia	WC	14th	7	3	2	5	4
Senior totals				41	10	12	22	8
